= 2018 Formula Renault Northern European Cup =

Motor racing competition

The 2018 Formula Renault Northern European Cup was the thirteenth and the final Formula Renault Northern European Cup season, an open-wheel motor racing series. It was a multi-event motor racing championship that featured drivers competing in 2 litre Formula Renault single seat race cars that conform to the technical regulations for the championship.

The championship title was won by German driver Doureid Ghattas, after recording five consecutive wins. He won races at Hungaroring, Nürburgring and Hockenheim, finished 42 points clear of his closest rival and Anders Motorsport teammate, Phil Hill, who was the winner at Spa and Hockenheim. Third place in the championship was settled by R-ace GP driver Gabriel Gandulia, who finished eight points behind Hill. Sharon Scolari was the last driver considered as regular driver finished fourth.

Over the course of the season, four different drivers won a race. Aside from Ghattas and Hill, other drivers (when they were eligible for the series trophy) to win were Logan Sargeant, who finished fifth in the championship, and his teammate Victor Martins. Alex Peroni, who finished seventh was the only driver excluding Ghattas and Hill, who was able to win more than one race.

== Teams and drivers ==
Team	No.	Driver name	Rounds
(France) R-ace GP	1	(United Kingdom) Max Fewtrell	2–6
(France) R-ace GP	2	(United States) Logan Sargeant	All
(France) R-ace GP	3	(France) Charles Milesi	All
(France) R-ace GP	4	(France) Victor Martins	All
(France) R-ace GP	5	(Argentina) Gabriel Gandulia	All
(Germany) Anders Motorsport	6	(Germany) Phil Hill	1–5
(Germany) Anders Motorsport	7	(Germany) Doureid Ghattas	All
(Germany) Josef Kaufmann Racing	11	(United Kingdom) Clément Novalak	4–6
(Germany) Josef Kaufmann Racing	12	(Netherlands) Richard Verschoor	3
(Germany) Josef Kaufmann Racing	16	(China) Yifei Ye	3–6
(France) Lamo Racing Car	16	(France) Thierry Malhomme	1
(France) Tech 1 Racing	21	(United States) Neil Verhagen	1, 3–6
(France) Tech 1 Racing	22	(Russia) Aleksandr Smolyar	1, 3–6
(France) Tech 1 Racing	23	(France) Thomas Neubauer	All
(France) Tech 1 Racing	24	(United Kingdom) Frank Bird	All
(Netherlands) MP Motorsport	31	(Denmark) Christian Lundgaard	1, 3–6
(Netherlands) MP Motorsport	32	(Australia) Alex Peroni	1, 3–6
(Netherlands) MP Motorsport	33	(Netherlands) Jarno Opmeer	3
(Netherlands) MP Motorsport	33	(Netherlands) Freek Schothorst	4–6
(France) Formula Motorsport	35	(France) Nicolas Melin	1
(France) Formula Motorsport	36	(France) Nicolas Pironneau	1
(United Kingdom) Arden Motorsport	41	(Australia) Oscar Piastri	3–6
(United Kingdom) Arden Motorsport	42	(Russia) Nikita Volegov	3–6
(United Kingdom) Arden Motorsport	43	(Morocco) Sami Taoufik	3–6
(Spain) AVF by Adrián Vallés	51	(Mexico) Axel Matus	3–6
(Spain) AVF by Adrián Vallés	52	(Spain) Xavier Lloveras	3
(Spain) AVF by Adrián Vallés	53	(Spain) Eliseo Martínez	3–6
(Spain) AVF by Adrián Vallés	54	(Colombia) Christian Muñoz	3–6
(Italy) JD Motorsport	61	(Italy) Lorenzo Colombo	2–6
(Italy) JD Motorsport	62	(Australia) Thomas Maxwell	3–6
(Italy) JD Motorsport	63	(Malaysia) Najiy Razak	3–6
(Switzerland) ScoRace Team	77	(Switzerland) Sharon Scolari	1–3, 5–6
(Switzerland) ScoRace Team	90	(Germany) Phil Hill	6
(Italy) Cram Motorsport	78	(Germany) Zichao Wang	2
(United Kingdom) Fortec Motorsports	84	(Russia) Vladimiros Tziortzis	3–4, 6
(United Kingdom) Fortec Motorsports	85	(Mexico) Raúl Guzmán	3–6
(United Kingdom) Fortec Motorsports	87	(France) Arthur Rougier	1, 3–6

== Calendar and results ==
The provisional calendar for the 2018 season was announced on 11 November 2017. The schedule was increased to six rounds. For the first time in the history, the series is scheduled to have event which will be part of the Pau Grand Prix. Hungaroring and Circuit Park Zandvoort were set to return to the calendar, while events at Nürburgring and Silverstone Circuit were set to be omitted. On 4 April 2018 the calendar was amended, with three rounds supporting 2018 Eurocup Formula Renault 2.0. Zandvoort opener was replaced by Nürburgring in the schedule. On 31 August 2018 the final round at Hockenheimring was rescheduled to an earlier date.

Round		Circuit	Date	Pole position	Fastest lap	Winning driver	Winning team	Supporting
1	R1	(France) Circuit de Pau-Ville	12 May	(Denmark) Christian Lundgaard	(Denmark) Christian Lundgaard	(Australia) Alex Peroni	(Netherlands) MP Motorsport	Pau Grand Prix
1	R2	(France) Circuit de Pau-Ville	13 May	(Australia) Alex Peroni	(France) Victor Martins	(Australia) Alex Peroni	(Netherlands) MP Motorsport	Pau Grand Prix
2	R1	(Italy) Autodromo Nazionale Monza	30 June	(France) Charles Milesi	(France) Charles Milesi	(United States) Logan Sargeant	(France) R-ace GP	Clio Cup Italia
2	R2	(Italy) Autodromo Nazionale Monza	1 July	(France) Victor Martins	(United States) Logan Sargeant	(France) Victor Martins	(France) R-ace GP	Clio Cup Italia
3	R1	(Belgium) Circuit de Spa-Francorchamps, Spa	27 July	(Germany) Phil Hill (Note: Lorenzo Colombo took a pole overall, but he wasn't Northern European Cup regular.)	(France) Victor Martins	(Germany) Phil Hill (Note: Christian Lundgaard won the race, but he wasn't eligible to claim winning trophy at Spa because he wasn't Northern European Cup regular.)	(Germany) Anders Motorsport	Eurocup Formula Renault 2.0
3	R2	(Belgium) Circuit de Spa-Francorchamps, Spa	28 July	(Argentina) Gabriel Gandulia (Note: Logan Sargeant took a pole overall, but he wasn't Northern European Cup regular.)	(France) Victor Martins	(Germany) Phil Hill (Note: Victor Martins won the race, but he wasn't eligible to claim winning trophy at Spa because he wasn't Northern European Cup regular.)	(Germany) Anders Motorsport	Eurocup Formula Renault 2.0
4	R1	(Hungary) Hungaroring	1 September	(Argentina) Gabriel Gandulia (Note: Christian Lundgaard took a pole overall, but he wasn't Northern European Cup regular.)	(Denmark) Christian Lundgaard	(Germany) Doureid Ghattas (Note: Yifei Ye won the race, but he wasn't eligible to claim winning trophy at Hungaroring because he wasn't Northern European Cup regular.)	(Germany) Anders Motorsport	Eurocup Formula Renault 2.0
4	R2	(Hungary) Hungaroring	2 September	(Germany) Doureid Ghattas	(Denmark) Christian Lundgaard	(Germany) Doureid Ghattas (Note: Christian Lundgaard won the race, but he wasn't eligible to claim winning trophy at Hungaroring because he wasn't Northern European Cup regular.)	(Germany) Anders Motorsport	Eurocup Formula Renault 2.0
5	R1	(Germany) Nürburgring, Nürburg	14 September	(Argentina) Gabriel Gandulia (Note: Logan Sargeant took a pole overall, but he wasn't Northern European Cup regular.)	(United Kingdom) Max Fewtrell	(Germany) Doureid Ghattas (Note: Logan Sargeant won the race, but he wasn't eligible to claim winning trophy at Nürburgring, because he wasn't Northern European Cup regular.)	(Germany) Anders Motorsport	Eurocup Formula Renault 2.0
5	R2	(Germany) Nürburgring, Nürburg	15 September	(Argentina) Gabriel Gandulia (Note: Max Fewtrell took a pole overall, but he wasn't Northern European Cup regular.)	(United Kingdom) Max Fewtrell	(Germany) Doureid Ghattas (Note: Max Fewtrell won the race, but he wasn't eligible to claim winning trophy at Nürburgring because he wasn't Northern European Cup regular.)	(Germany) Anders Motorsport	Eurocup Formula Renault 2.0
6	R1	(Germany) Hockenheimring, Hockenheim	22 September	(Germany) Doureid Ghattas (Note: Max Fewtrell took a pole overall, but he wasn't Northern European Cup regular.)	(United Kingdom) Max Fewtrell	(Germany) Doureid Ghattas (Note: Max Fewtrell won the race, but he wasn't eligible to claim winning trophy at Nürburgring because he wasn't Northern European Cup regular.)	(Germany) Anders Motorsport	Eurocup Formula Renault 2.0
6	R2	(Germany) Hockenheimring, Hockenheim	23 September	(Germany) Doureid Ghattas	(United States) Logan Sargeant	(Germany) Phil Hill (Note: Max Fewtrell won the race, but he wasn't eligible to claim winning trophy at Spa because he wasn't Northern European Cup regular.)	(Switzerland) Scorace Team	Eurocup Formula Renault 2.0

== Championship standings ==
Points system

Points were awarded to the top 20 classified finishers.

Position	**1st**	**2nd**	**3rd**	**4th**	**5th**	**6th**	**7th**	**8th**	**9th**	**10th**	**11th**	**12th**	**13th**	**14th**	**15th**	**16th**	**17th**	**18th**	**19th**	**20th**
Points	30	24	20	17	16	15	14	13	12	11	10	9	8	7	6	5	4	3	2	1

=== Drivers' championship ===
Pos.	Driver	PAU (France)		MNZ (Italy)		SPA (Belgium)		HUN (Hungary)		NÜR (Germany)		HOC (Germany)		Points
Pos.	Driver	1	2	3	4	5	6	7	8	9	10	11	12	Points
1	(Germany) Doureid Ghattas	9	9	10	8	23	20	20	**19**	22	20	**16**	**20**	266
2	(Germany) Phil Hill	15	13	8	6	**19**	18	21	23	23	DNS	21	15	224
3	(Argentina) Gabriel Gandulia	10	10	9	7	24	**21**	**22**	20	**24**	**24**	22	17	216
4	(Switzerland) Sharon Scolari	Ret	Ret	11	10	Ret	DNS			26	23	23	21	96
5	(United States) Logan Sargeant	3	3	1	4	9	2	5	7	1	4	4	5	87
6	(France) Victor Martins	5	4	3	**1**	Ret	1	4	9	4	2	Ret	Ret	83
7	(Australia) Alex Peroni	1	**1**			Ret	25	13	5	9	9	6	Ret	60
8	(France) Thomas Neubauer	7	7	7	5	WD	WD	Ret	Ret	21	10	Ret	Ret	58
9	(France) Charles Milesi	4	Ret	**5**	2	10	13	9	12	7	3	10	8	57
10	(United Kingdom) Frank Bird	11	6	4	11	14	11	12	13	Ret	21	20	13	52
11	(Denmark) Christian Lundgaard	**2**	2			1	8	2	1	3	5	Ret	Ret	48
12	(Italy) Lorenzo Colombo			6	3	6	5	6	3	11	22	Ret	4	35
13	(United States) Neil Verhagen	6	5			25	22	14	14	13	12	7	6	31
14	(France) Arthur Rougier	8	8			4	6	Ret	8	10	13	12	10	26
15	(United Kingdom) Max Fewtrell			2	Ret	5	7	3	2	2	1	1	1	24
16	(Germany) Zichao Wang			12	9									21
17	(Russia) Aleksandr Smolyar	13	11			11	16	10	6	5	8	8	Ret	18
18	(France) Nicolas Pironneau	12	14											16
19	(France) Nicolas Melin	14	12											16
20	(France) Thierry Malhomme	16	15											11
guest drivers ineligible to score points
	(China) Yifei Ye					2	3	1	11	6	6	2	3	
	(Australia) Oscar Piastri					3	9	7	4	15	7	3	2	
	(Australia) Thomas Maxwell					7	4	11	25	8	11	5	7	
	(Netherlands) Richard Verschoor					8	10							
	(Mexico) Axel Matus					Ret	26	8	15	16	Ret	Ret	14	
	(Mexico) Raúl Guzmán					13	23	Ret	Ret	25	18	9	11	
	(Spain) Eliseo Martínez					15	12	15	21	12	Ret	14	9	
	(Morocco) Sami Taoufik					17	Ret	16	10	17	14	19	12	
	(United Kingdom) Clément Novalak							18	22	14	16	11	22	
	(Netherlands) Jarno Opmeer					12	24							
	(Russia) Nikita Volegov					16	Ret	19	17	18	15	13	24	
	(Spain) Xavier Lloveras					22	14							
	(Netherlands) Freek Schothorst							17	24	20	17	15	19	
	(Malaysia) Najiy Razak					18	15	23	18	Ret	Ret	Ret	23	
	(Colombia) Christian Muñoz					21	17	Ret	Ret	19	19	17	16	
	(Russia) Vladimiros Tziortzis					20	19	Ret	16			18	18	
Pos.	Driver	PAU (France)		MNZ (Italy)		SPA (Belgium)		HUN (Hungary)		NÜR (Germany)		HOC (Germany)		Points

Colour	Result
Gold	Winner
Silver	Second place
Bronze	Third place
Green	Points classification
Blue	Non-points classification
Blue	Non-classified finish (NC)
Purple	Retired, not classified (Ret)
Red	Did not qualify (DNQ)
Red	Did not pre-qualify (DNPQ)
Black	Disqualified (DSQ)
White	Did not start (DNS)
White	Withdrew (WD)
White	Race cancelled (C)
Blank	Did not practice (DNP)
Blank	Did not arrive (DNA)
Blank	Excluded (EX)

**Bold** – Pole
Italics – Fastest Lap
† — Drivers did not finish the race, but were classified as they completed over 75% of the race distance.

=== Teams' championship ===
Pos	Team	Points
1	(France) R-ace GP	467
2	(Germany) Anders Motorsport	436
3	(Switzerland) ScoRace	150
4	(Netherlands) MP Motorsport	86
5	(France) Tech 1 Racing	66
6	(Italy) JD Motorsport	23
7	(United Kingdom) Fortec Motorsport	8
8	(Italy) Cram Motorsport	2
9	(France) Formula Motorsport	0
10	(France) Lamo Car Racing	0
