= Frank Bird (racing driver) =

British racing driver (born 1999)

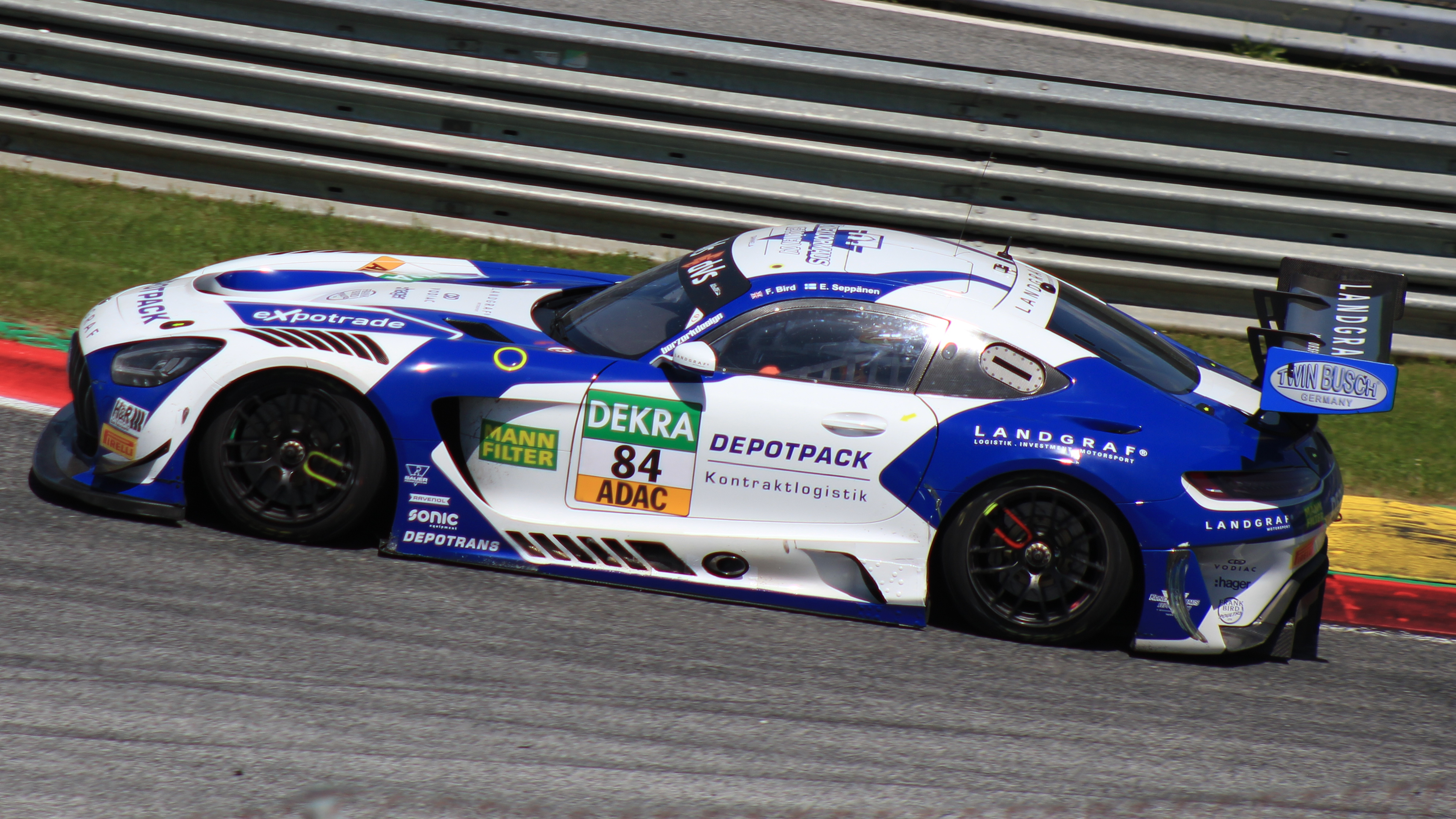
- Bird in 2022
- Nationality: (United Kingdom) British
- Born: Frank Bird Jr. 20 August 1999 (age 27) Nassington, Northamptonshire, United Kingdom
- Relatives: Max Bird (brother)

GT World Challenge Europe Endurance Cup career
- Debut season: 2020
- Current team: 2 Seas Motorsport
- Categorisation: FIA Silver
- Car number: 60
- Starts: 12 (12 entries)
- Wins: 0
- Podiums: 1
- Poles: 0
- Fastest laps: 0
- Best finish: 11th (Silver Cup) in 2021

Frank "Frankie" Bird Jr. (born 20 August 1999) is a British racing driver. He is part of the Mercedes-AMG driver lineup, having been introduced to the programme as a junior driver in 2024.

== Career ==
After starting out his career in 2015 racing in the Ginetta Junior Championship, Bird switched to single-seaters, competing in British F4 and the Formula Renault Eurocup without much success. He raced in the Eurocup until 2019 before moving into GT3 competition, having previously competed in several GT4 races and taken a Renault Clio Cup class win at the 2018 Dubai 24 Hour.

In 2020, Bird entered the Silver Cup class of the GT World Challenge Europe Endurance Cup with Team Parker Racing as part of Bentley's academy programme. The following year, he moved to the GTWC Sprint Cup, finishing second in class after taking two Silver Cup wins alongside Ryuichiro Tomita. Bird then entered the ADAC GT Masters in 2022 with Team Landgraf, though he would end up 21st in the overall standings. He returned to the Sprint Cup in 2023 and won three races in class, helping teammate Jordan Love to the Silver Cup title as Bird had missed two events due to the death of his father Paul Bird, a former rally driver who owned the Paul Bird Motorsport team. In addition, Bird won that year's 24 Hours of Nürburgring in the two-car SPX category, driving a Mercedes-AMG GT2.

== Racing record ==
=== Racing career summary ===
Season	Series	Team	Races	Wins	Poles	F/Laps	Podiums	Points	Position
2015	Ginetta Junior Championship	R & J Motorsport	20	0	0	0	0	69	22nd
2015	Ginetta Junior Winter Series	R & J Motorsport	4	0	0	0	0	0	NC
2016	F4 British Championship	Fortec Motorsports	30	0	0	0	0	3	19th
2016	Eurocup Formula Renault 2.0	Fortec Motorsports	2	0	0	0	0	0	NC†
2017	Formula Renault Eurocup	Fortec Motorsports	23	0	0	0	0	0	32nd
2017	Formula Renault Northern European Cup	Fortec Motorsports	2	0	0	0	0	26	20th
2018	Formula Renault Eurocup	Tech 1 Racing	20	0	0	0	0	6	18th
2018	Formula Renault Northern European Cup	Tech 1 Racing	12	0	0	0	0	52	10th
2018	24H TCE Series - Continents' - A2	Ciceley Motorsport	1	1	0	0	1	0	NC†
2018	Gulf 12 Hours - GT4	Ciceley Motorsport	2	0	0	0	0	N/A	DNF
2019	Formula Renault Eurocup	Arden	20	0	0	0	0	14	18th
2019	24H GT Series - Continents' - GT4	Ciceley Motorsport	1	0	0	0	0	0	NC†
2020	GT World Challenge Europe Endurance Cup	Team Parker Racing	4	0	0	0	0	0	NC
2020	GT World Challenge Europe Endurance Cup - Silver	Team Parker Racing	4	0	0	0	0	23	17th
2020	Intercontinental GT Challenge	Team Parker Racing	1	0	0	0	0	0	NC
2020	BRDC British Formula 3 Championship	Fortec Motorsports	3	0	0	0	0	13	24th
2021	GT World Challenge Europe Endurance Cup	Belgian Audi Club Team WRT	5	0	0	0	0	4	28th
2021	GT World Challenge Europe Endurance Cup - Silver	Belgian Audi Club Team WRT	5	0	0	0	1	51	11th
2021	GT World Challenge Europe Sprint Cup	Belgian Audi Club Team WRT	10	0	0	0	1	33.5	8th
2021	GT World Challenge Europe Sprint Cup - Silver	Belgian Audi Club Team WRT	10	2	0	0	5	85.5	**2nd**
2021	Intercontinental GT Challenge	Team WRT	1	0	0	0	0	0	NC
2021	24H GT Series - GT3 Pro	Team WRT	1	0	0	0	1	26	NC†
2022	Asian Le Mans Series - GT	Garage 59	4	0	0	0	1	29.5	7th
2022	ADAC GT Masters	Mann-Filter Team Landgraf	13	0	0	0	0	52	21st
2022	GT World Challenge Europe Endurance Cup	Haupt Racing Team	1	0	0	0	0	0	NC
2022	GT World Challenge Europe Endurance Cup - Silver	Haupt Racing Team	1	0	0	0	0	19	18th
2022	International GT Open	Haupt Racing Team	1	0	0	0	0	24	14th
2023	Asian Le Mans Series - GT	Haupt Racing Team	4	0	0	0	0	6	15th
2023	GT World Challenge Europe Sprint Cup	Haupt Racing Team	6	0	0	0	0	9	15th
2023	GT World Challenge Europe Sprint Cup - Silver	Haupt Racing Team	6	3	1	2	5	80.5	4th
2023	GT World Challenge Europe Endurance Cup	Haupt Racing Team	1	0	0	0	0	0	NC
2023	GT World Challenge Europe Endurance Cup - Pro-Am	Haupt Racing Team	1	0	0	0	0	11	18th
2023	Intercontinental GT Challenge	Mercedes-AMG Team GruppeM Racing	1	0	0	0	0	12	23rd
2023	Nürburgring Langstrecken-Serie - VT2-FWD	SRS Team Sorg Rennsport	1	0	0	0	0	0	NC†
2023	Nürburgring Langstrecken-Serie - V4		1	0	0	0	0	0	NC†
2023	Nürburgring Langstrecken-Serie - VT3	Team Mathol Racing e.V.	2	2	2	2	2	0	NC†
2023	Nürburgring Langstrecken-Serie - SP9	Haupt Racing Team	1	0	0	0	0	0	NC†
2023	24 Hours of Nürburgring - SPX	Mercedes-AMG Team HRT	1	1	?	?	1	N/A	**1st**
2024	Nürburgring Langstrecken-Serie - SP9	Mercedes-AMG Team HRT	2	0	0	0	0	*	*
2024	Nürburgring Langstrecken-Serie - SP9	Mercedes-AMG Team Bilstein by HRT	2	0	0	0	0	*	*
2024	24 Hours of Nürburgring - SP9	Mercedes-AMG Team Bilstein by HRT	1	0	0	0	0	N/A	11th
2024	GT World Challenge Europe Endurance Cup	2 Seas Motorsport	1	0	0	0	0	0	NC
2024	GT World Challenge Europe Endurance Cup - Gold	2 Seas Motorsport	1	0	0	0	0	27*	8th*

^{†} As Bird was a guest driver, he was ineligible to score points.* Season still in progress.

=== Complete Ginetta Junior Championship results ===
(key) (Races in bold indicate pole position; races in italics indicate fastest lap)

Year	Team	1	2	3	4	5	6	7	8	9	10	11	12	13	14	15	16	17	18	19	20	DC	Points
2015	R & J Motorsport	BHI; 1 Ret	BHI; 2; 16	DON; 1; 21	DON; 2; 18	THR; 1; 17	THR; 2; 17	OUL; 1 Ret	OUL; 2; 17	CRO; 1; 20	CRO; 2 Ret	SNE; 1; 15	SNE; 2; 21	KNO; 1; 12	KNO; 2; 14	ROC; 1; 19	ROC; 2; 19	SIL; 1; 20	SIL; 2; 15	BHGP; 1; 16	BHGP; 2; 11	22nd	69

=== Complete F4 British Championship results ===
(key) (Races in bold indicate pole position; races in italics indicate fastest lap)

Year	Team	1	2	3	4	5	6	7	8	9	10	11	12	13	14	15	16	17	18	19	20	21	22	23	24	25	26	27	28	29	30	DC	Points
2016	Fortec Motorsports	BHI; 1; 18	BHI; 2 Ret	BHI; 3; 17	DON; 1; 15	DON; 2; 11	DON; 3; 16	THR; 1; 14	THR; 2 Ret	THR; 3; 15	OUL; 1; 15	OUL; 2; 14	OUL; 3 Ret	CRO; 1; 10	CRO; 2 Ret	CRO; 3; 15	SNE; 1; 13	SNE; 2; 10	SNE; 3; 14	KNO; 1; 12	KNO; 2; 10	KNO; 3; 14	ROC; 1; 14	ROC; 2 NC	ROC; 3; 17	SIL; 1; 15	SIL; 2; 16	SIL; 3; 13	BHGP; 1; 12	BHGP; 2 Ret	BHGP; 3; 16	19th	3

=== Complete Formula Renault Eurocup results ===
(key) (Races in bold indicate pole position) (Races in italics indicate fastest lap)

Year	Team	1	2	3	4	5	6	7	8	9	10	11	12	13	14	15	16	17	18	19	20	21	22	23	Pos	Points
2016	Fortec Motorsports	ALC; 1	ALC; 2	ALC; 3	MON; 1	MNZ; 1	MNZ; 2	MNZ; 1	RBR; 1	RBR; 2	LEC; 1	LEC; 2	SPA; 1	SPA; 2	EST; 1; 15	EST; 2; 20									NC†	0
2017	Fortec Motorsports	MNZ; 1; 19	MNZ; 2; 17	SIL; 1; 17	SIL; 2; 22	PAU; 1; 20	PAU; 2; 17	MON; 1 Ret	MON; 2 Ret	HUN; 1; 23	HUN; 2; 22	HUN; 3; 27	NÜR; 1; 29	NÜR; 2; 24	RBR; 1; 25	RBR; 2; 23	LEC; 1; 22	LEC; 2; 25	SPA; 1; 32	SPA; 2; 27	SPA; 3; 20	CAT; 1; 24	CAT; 2 Ret	CAT; 3; 20	32nd	0
2018	Tech 1 Racing	LEC; 1; 17	LEC; 2; 18	MNZ; 1; 13	MNZ; 2; 8	SIL; 1 Ret	SIL; 2; 21	MON; 1; 22	MON; 2; 20	RBR; 1; 13	RBR; 2; 10	SPA; 1; 14	SPA; 2; 11	HUN; 1; 12	HUN; 2; 13	NÜR; 1 Ret	NÜR; 2; 21	HOC; 1; 20	HOC; 2; 13	CAT; 1; 10	CAT; 2; 17				18th	6
2019	Arden	MNZ; 1; 8	MNZ; 2; 14	SIL; 1; 15	SIL; 2; 20	MON; 1; 13	MON; 2; 15	LEC; 1; 10	LEC; 2; 12	SPA; 1; 17	SPA; 2; 11	NÜR; 1; 13	NÜR; 2; 10	HUN; 1; 6	HUN; 2 Ret	CAT; 1; 15	CAT; 2; 16	HOC; 1; 9	HOC; 2; 16	YMC; 1; 17	YMC; 2; 15				18th	14

^{†} As Bird was a guest driver, he was ineligible to score points

=== Complete Formula Renault Northern European Cup results ===
(key) (Races in bold indicate pole position) (Races in italics indicate fastest lap)

Year	Team	1	2	3	4	5	6	7	8	9	10	11	12	Pos	Points
2017	Fortec Motorsport	MNZ; 1; 9	MNZ; 2; 7	ASS; 1	ASS; 2	NÜR; 1	NÜR; 2	SPA; 1; 32	SPA; 2; 27	SPA; 3; 20	HOC; 1	HOC; 2		20th	26
2018	Fortec Motorsport	PAU; 1; 11	PAU; 2; 6	MNZ; 1; 4	MNZ; 2; 11	SPA; 1; 14	SPA; 2; 11	HUN; 1; 12	HUN; 2; 13	NÜR; 1 Ret	NÜR; 2; 21	HOC; 1; 20	HOC; 2; 13	10th	52

=== Complete GT World Challenge results ===
==== GT World Challenge Europe Endurance Cup ====
(Races in bold indicate pole position) (Races in italics indicate fastest lap)

Year	Team	Car	Class	1	2	3	4	5	6	7	Pos.	Points
2020	Team Parker Racing	Bentley Continental GT3	Silver	IMO; 37	NÜR; 37	SPA; 6H; 37	SPA; 12H; 30	SPA; 24H; 28	LEC; Ret		17th	23
2021	Belgian Audi Club Team WRT	Audi R8 LMS Evo	Silver	MNZ; 8	LEC; Ret	SPA; 6H; 37	SPA; 12H; 16	SPA; 24H; 24	NÜR; 16	CAT; 12	11th	51
2022	Haupt Racing Team	Mercedes-AMG GT3 Evo	Silver	IMO	LEC	SPA; 6H; 20	SPA; 12H; 12	SPA; 24H; Ret	HOC	CAT	18th	19
2023	Haupt Racing Team	Mercedes-AMG GT3 Evo	Pro-Am	MNZ	LEC	SPA; 6H; 50	SPA; 12H; 47	SPA; 24H; Ret	NÜR	CAT	18th	11
2024	2 Seas Motorsport	Mercedes-AMG GT3 Evo	Gold	LEC	SPA; 6H; 20	SPA; 12H; 53	SPA; 24H; 42	NÜR	MNZ	JED	11th	27

^{*}Season still in progress.

==== GT World Challenge Europe Sprint Cup ====
(key) (Races in bold indicate pole position) (Races in italics indicate fastest lap)

Year	Team	Car	Class	1	2	3	4	5	6	7	8	9	10	Pos.	Points
2021	Belgian Audi Club Team WRT	Audi R8 LMS Evo	Silver	MAG; 1; 24	MAG; 2; 11	ZAN; 1; 4	ZAN; 2; 7	MIS; 1; 26	MIS; 2; 4	BRH; 1; 3	BRH; 2; 5	VAL; 1; 14	VAL; 2; 16	2nd	85.5
2023	Haupt Racing Team	Mercedes-AMG GT3 Evo	Silver	BRH; 1; 20	BRH; 2; 16	**MIS**; **1**; 12	MIS; 2; 16	HOC; 1	HOC; 2	VAL; 1	VAL; 2	ZAN; 1; 6	**ZAN**; **2**; 6	4th	80.5

=== Complete ADAC GT Masters results ===
(key) (Races in bold indicate pole position) (Races in italics indicate fastest lap)

Year	Team	Car	1	2	3	4	5	6	7	8	9	10	11	12	13	14	DC	Points
2022	Mann-Filter Team Landgraf	Mercedes-AMG GT3 Evo	OSC; 1 DNS	OSC; 2; 19	RBR; 1; 20	RBR; 2; 18	ZAN; 1; 17	ZAN; 2; 9	NÜR; 1; 6	NÜR; 2; 4	LAU; 1; 16	LAU; 2 Ret	SAC; 1; 7	SAC; 2; 10	HOC; 1; 10	HOC; 2 Ret	21st	52
