= Max Fewtrell =

British racing driver (born 1999)

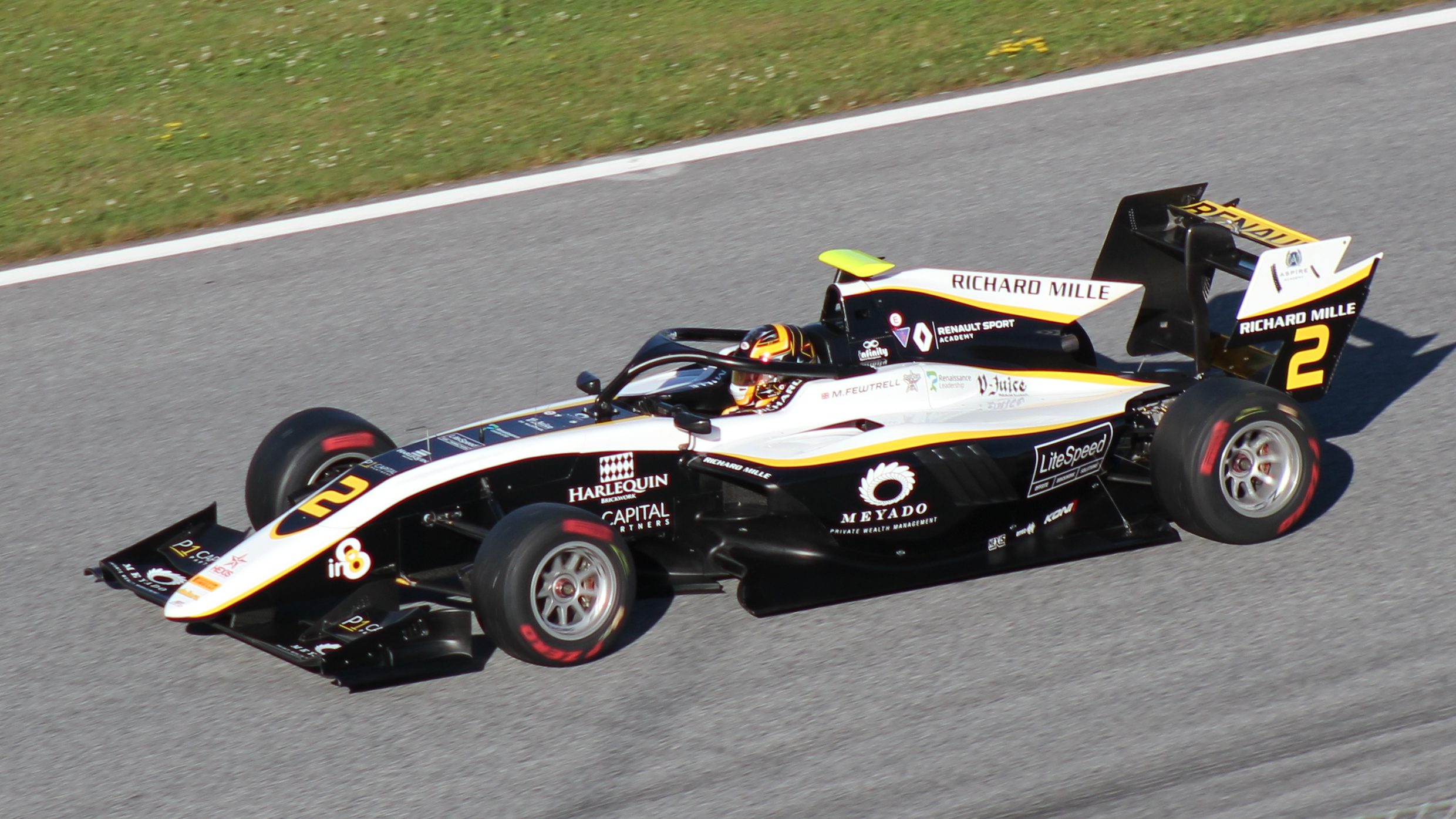
- Nationality: (United Kingdom) British
- Born: Maximilian Bradley Fewtrell; 29 July 1999 (age 27) Birmingham, West Midlands, England

FIA Formula 3 Championship career
- Debut season: 2019
- Car number: 7
- Former teams: ART Grand Prix, Hitech Grand Prix
- Starts: 28 (28 entries)
- Wins: 0
- Podiums: 2
- Poles: 0
- Fastest laps: 0
- Best finish: 10th in 2019

Previous series
- 2019 2017–18 2016 2015–16: F3 Asian Winter Series; Formula Renault Eurocup; F4 British Championship; MRF Challenge

Championship titles
- 2018 2016: Formula Renault Eurocup; F4 British Championship

Maximilian Bradley Fewtrell (born 29 July 1999) is a British content creator and podcaster and former racing driver. He was the 2016 British F4 champion.

Fewtrell is the managing partner of Lando Norris's content and lifestyle company Quadrant and also hosts Quadrant's podcast named Quadcast alongside Izzy Hammond, the daughter of the former Top Gear presenter Richard Hammond.

== Early life ==
Fewtrell was born in Birmingham. At a young age, he moved to Malaysia first, then Singapore for nine years. He has two brothers and an older sister.

== Racing career ==
=== Karting ===
Fewtrell began karting in 2009 at the age of ten after watching the Singapore Grand Prix. He karted in Singapore but competed mainly in Malaysia. He went on to take major karting titles in 2013 and 2014.

=== Lower formulae ===
In 2015, Fewtrell graduated to single-seaters, partaking in the MRF Challenge where he finished eleventh. The following year, Fewtrell joined Carlin for a campaign in British F4. He took three victories and claimed the championship in the final race at Brands Hatch.

=== Formula Renault 2.0 ===
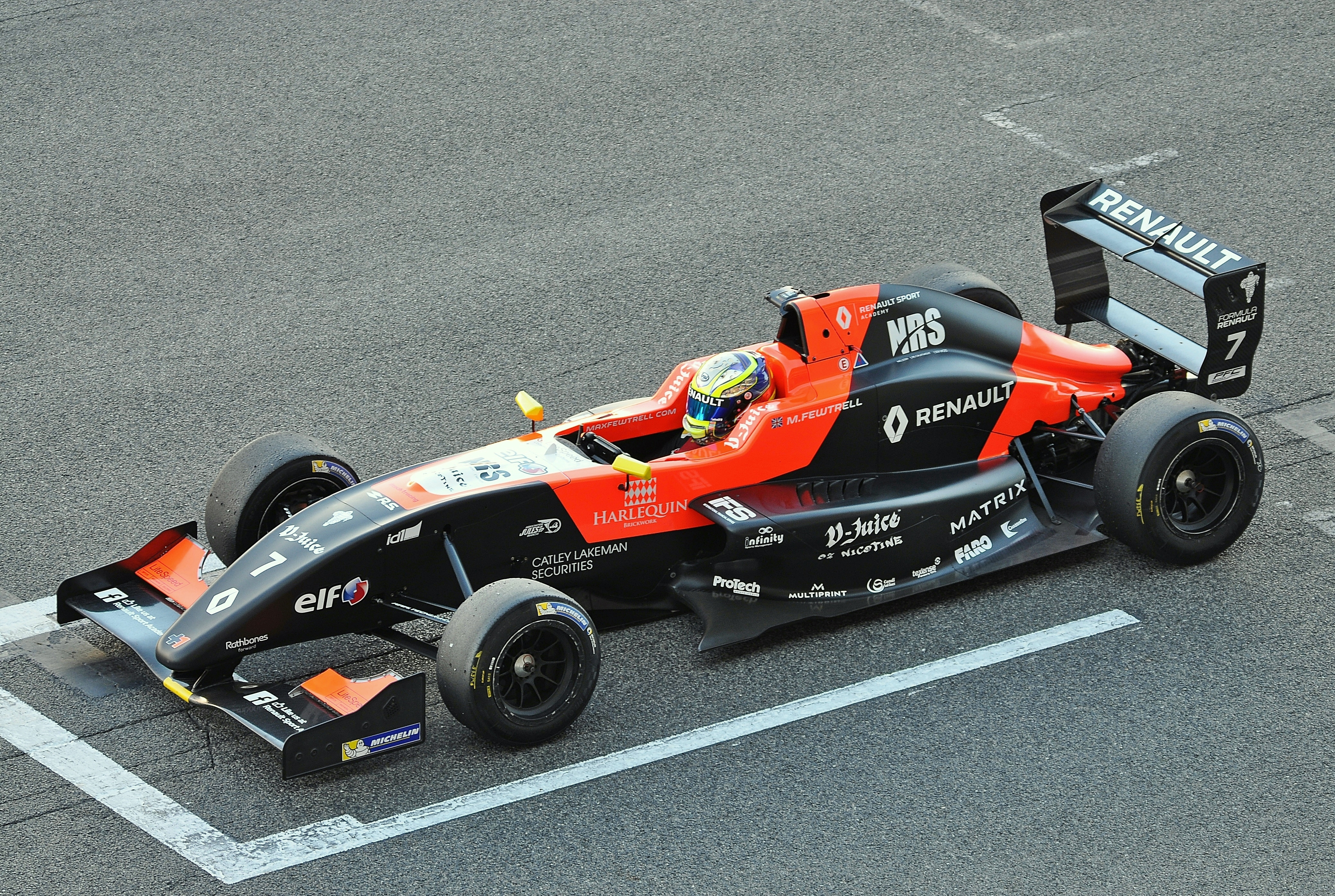
Max Fewtrell, Formula Renault 2.0

In December 2016, Fewtrell was named as part of Tech 1 Racing's driver line-up for the 2017 seasons of Formula Renault 2.0. Around the same time, Fewtrell was named as part of the Renault Sport Academy's 2017 line-up. He won a race at the Red Bull Ring on his way to the rookies' title, and came sixth in the drivers' championship.

The following year, Fewtrell switched to reigning team champions R-ace GP. He achieved six poles and six wins, including a double victory across a two race weekend at Hockenheim, making him the first driver to do so since Nyck de Vries. Fewtrell claimed the championship title in the season finale after a season-long battle with fellow Renault junior Christian Lundgaard.

=== GP3 Series ===
After winning the 2018 Formula Renault Eurocup, Fewtrell partook in the post-season test with ART Grand Prix.

=== FIA Formula 3 ===
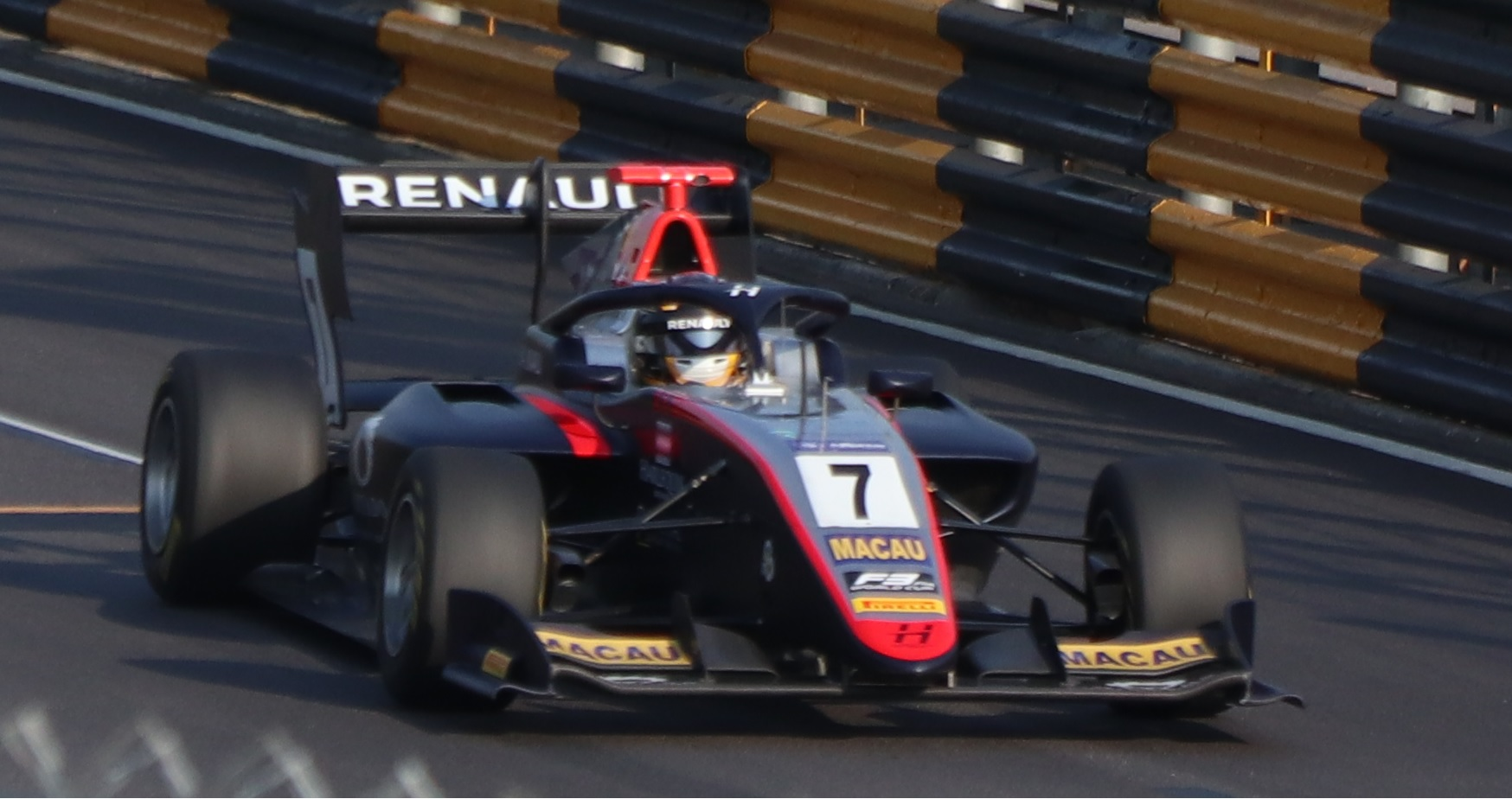
Fewtrell at 2019 Macau Grand Prix

In January 2019, Fewtrell joined the championship with ART Grand Prix, alongside Christian Lundgaard and David Beckmann. He finished on the podium twice, first in Austria, and then again at the Hungaroring, both being second-place finishes. Fewtrell concluded his debut season in tenth place, after scoring 57 points.

Fewtrell subsequently joined Hitech GP for the 2020 season. He left the team in August 2020 and retired from racing.

== Other ventures ==
Fewtrell has gained over 150,000 followers on the streaming platform Twitch, where he plays FPS games such as Escape from Tarkov and Call of Duty or races in iRacing on a simulator alongside fellow streamers and occasionally with his close friend Lando Norris, who currently races in Formula One. He took part in Norris' Twitch Rivals Charity Tournament in 2021. After appearing in some earlier content, on 13 June 2021, Fewtrell was announced as a new ambassador and core member of Norris' entertainment, athlete and apparel brand, Team Quadrant. As part of Quadrant's rebrand in March 2025, Fewtrell has been promoted as Quadrant's managing partner.

Fewtrell launched his own merchandise line called Fewtrell Fits in December 2020. The line has since been discontinued.

During the Goodwood Festival Of Speed in 2022, Fewtrell took part in two sessions of the hill climb with Veloce Racing's Extreme E car, the Spark Odyssey 21, alongside three-time W Series champion Jamie Chadwick.

== Karting record ==
=== Karting career summary ===
| Season | Series | Team | Position |
|---|---|---|---|
| 2010 | Macao International Kart Grand Prix - Mini ROK | | 2nd |
| 2010 | ROK Cup International Final - Mini ROK | | 25th |
| 2011 | WSK Final Cup - 60 Mini | | 32nd |
| 2011 | SKUSA SuperNationals XV - TaG Cadet | | 20th |
| 2012 | WSK Master Series - 60 Mini | | |
| 2012 | WSK Euro Series - 60 Minì | MRM | |
| 2012 | WSK Final Cup - KF3 | | 25th |
| 2012 | 41° Trofeo delle Industrie - KF3 | | 15th |
| 2012 | Italian Championship - 60 Mini | | |
| 2012 | Italian ACI Karting Championship - KF3 | | 30th |
| 2013 | WSK Euro Series - KFJ | | 23rd |
| 2013 | WSK Final Cup - KFJ | Ricky Flynn Motorsport | 11th |
| 2013 | 42° Trofeo delle Industrie - KF3 | Ricky Flynn Motorsport | 4th |
| 2013 | CIK-FIA International Super Cup - KFJ | | 7th |
| 2013 | South Garda Winter Cup - KF3 | | 16th |
| 2013 | WSK Super Master Series - KFJ | | 7th |
| 2014 | WSK Champions Cup - KFJ | | 2nd |
| 2014 | CIK-FIA European Championship - KF Junior | Ricky Flynn Motorsport | 8th |
| 2014 | Andrea Margutti Trophy - KFJ | Ricky Flynn Motorsport | 1st |
| 2014 | WSK Super Master Series - KFJ | Ricky Flynn Motorsport | 5th |
| 2014 | German Kart Championship - KF Junior | Ricky Flynn Motorsport | 3rd |
| 2014 | South Garda Winter Cup - KF3 | Ricky F | 2nd |
| 2015 | WSK Champions Cup - KF | | 17th |
| 2015 | South Garda Winter Cup - KF | Ricky Flynn Motorsport | 28th |
| 2015 | CIK-FIA European Championship - KF | Ricky Flynn Motorsport | |
| 2015 | WSK Super Master Series - KF | | 11th |
| 2015 | Andrea Margutti Trophy - KF | | 3rd |

== Racing record ==
=== Racing career summary ===
| Season | Series | Team | Races | Wins | Poles | FLaps | Podiums | Points | Position |
|---|---|---|---|---|---|---|---|---|---|
| 2015–16 | MRF Challenge Formula 2000 Championship | MRF Racing | 14 | 0 | 0 | 0 | 1 | 51 | 11th |
| 2016 | F4 British Championship | Carlin | 30 | 3 | 3 | 3 | 15 | 358 | **1st** |
| 2017 | Formula Renault Eurocup | Tech 1 Racing | 23 | 1 | 0 | 0 | 1 | 164 | 6th |
| 2017 | Formula Renault NEC | Tech 1 Racing | 5 | 0 | 0 | 1 | 2 | 48 | 12th |
| 2018 | Formula Renault Eurocup | R-ace GP | 20 | 6 | 6 | 6 | 11 | 275.5 | **1st** |
| 2018 | Formula Renault NEC | R-ace GP | 10 | 0 | 0 | 3 | 1 | 24 | 15th‡ |
| 2019 | FIA Formula 3 Championship | ART Grand Prix | 16 | 0 | 0 | 0 | 2 | 57 | 10th |
| 2019 | F3 Asian Winter Series | Dragon Hitech GP | 3 | 0 | 0 | 0 | 0 | 20 | 11th |
| 2019 | Macau Grand Prix | Hitech Grand Prix | 1 | 0 | 0 | 0 | 0 | N/A | 18th |
| 2020 | FIA Formula 3 Championship | Hitech Grand Prix | 12 | 0 | 0 | 0 | 0 | 5 | 20th |

^{‡} Fewtrell was ineligible for points from the second round onwards.
^{*} Season still in progress.

=== Complete MRF Challenge Formula 2000 Championship results ===
(key) (Races in bold indicate pole position; races in italics indicate fastest lap)

| Year | 1 | 2 | 3 | 4 | 5 | 6 | 7 | 8 | 9 | 10 | 11 | 12 | 13 | 14 | DC | Points |
|---|---|---|---|---|---|---|---|---|---|---|---|---|---|---|---|---|
| 2015-16 | ABU; 1; 11 | ABU; 2; 11 | ABU; 3; 10 | ABU; 4; 13 | BHR; 1; 10 | BHR; 2; 10 | DUB; 1; 6 | DUB; 2; 3 | DUB; 3; 8 | DUB; 4 Ret | CHE; 1; 10 | CHE; 2; 7 | CHE; 3; 7 | CHE; 4; 6 | 11th | 51 |

=== Complete F4 British Championship results ===
(key) (Races in bold indicate pole position; races in italics indicate fastest lap)

| Year | Team | 1 | 2 | 3 | 4 | 5 | 6 | 7 | 8 | 9 | 10 | 11 | 12 | 13 | 14 | 15 | 16 | 17 | 18 | 19 | 20 | 21 | 22 | 23 | 24 | 25 | 26 | 27 | 28 | 29 | 30 | DC | Points |
|---|---|---|---|---|---|---|---|---|---|---|---|---|---|---|---|---|---|---|---|---|---|---|---|---|---|---|---|---|---|---|---|---|---|
| 2016 | Carlin | BHI; 1; 2 | BHI; 2; 6 | BHI; 3; 6 | DON; 1; 3 | DON; 2; 3 | **DON**; **3**; 1 | THR; 1 Ret | THR; 2 Ret | THR; 3; 3 | OUL; 1; 5 | OUL; 2; 5 | OUL; 3; 4 | CRO; 1; 2 | CRO; 2; 3 | CRO; 3; 3 | SNE; 1 Ret | SNE; 2; 9 | SNE; 3; 3 | KNO; 1; 8 | KNO; 2; 3 | KNO; 3; 5 | ROC; 1; 3 | ROC; 2; 3 | ROC; 3; 1 | SIL; 1; 11 | SIL; 2; 7 | SIL; 3; 5 | **BHGP**; **1**; 3 | BHGP; 2; 3 | **BHGP**; **3**; 1 | 1st | 358 |

=== Complete Formula Renault NEC results ===
(key) (Races in bold indicate pole position) (Races in italics indicate fastest lap)

| Year | Entrant | 1 | 2 | 3 | 4 | 5 | 6 | 7 | 8 | 9 | 10 | 11 | 12 | DC | Points |
|---|---|---|---|---|---|---|---|---|---|---|---|---|---|---|---|
| 2017 | Tech 1 Racing | MNZ; 1; 2 | MNZ; 2; 2 | ASS; 1 | ASS; 2 | NÜR; 1 | NÜR; 2 | SPA; 1; 5 | SPA; 2; 4 | SPA; 3; 9 | HOC; 1 | HOC; 2 | | 12th | 48 |
| 2018 | R-ace GP | PAU; 1 | PAU; 2 | MNZ; 1; 2 | MNZ; 2 Ret | SPA; 1; 5 | SPA; 2; 7 | HUN; 1; 3 | HUN; 2; 2 | NÜR; 1; 2 | NÜR; 2; 1 | HOC; 1; 1 | HOC; 2; 1 | 15th | 24 |

=== Complete Formula Renault Eurocup results ===
(key) (Races in bold indicate pole position) (Races in italics indicate fastest lap)

| Year | Team | 1 | 2 | 3 | 4 | 5 | 6 | 7 | 8 | 9 | 10 | 11 | 12 | 13 | 14 | 15 | 16 | 17 | 18 | 19 | 20 | 21 | 22 | 23 | Pos | Points |
|---|---|---|---|---|---|---|---|---|---|---|---|---|---|---|---|---|---|---|---|---|---|---|---|---|---|---|
| 2017 | Tech 1 Racing | MNZ; 1; 8 | MNZ; 2; 8 | SIL; 1; 4 | SIL; 2; 4 | PAU; 1; 7 | PAU; 2; 5 | MON; 1; 16 | MON; 2; 13 | HUN; 1; 13 | HUN; 2; 6 | HUN; 3; 9 | NÜR; 1; 6 | NÜR; 2; 7 | RBR; 1; 1 | RBR; 2; 4 | LEC; 1; 5 | LEC; 2; 6 | SPA; 1; 5 | SPA; 2; 4 | SPA; 3; 9 | CAT; 1 Ret | CAT; 2; 4 | CAT; 3; 7 | 6th | 164 |
| 2018 | R-ace GP | **LEC**; **1**; 2 | **LEC**; **2**; 1 | MNZ; 1; 22 | MNZ; 2; 10 | **SIL**; **1**; 1 | SIL; 2 Ret | MON; 1; 7 | MON; 2; 8 | **RBR**; **1**; 1 | RBR; 2; 2 | SPA; 1; 5 | SPA; 2; 7 | HUN; 1; 3 | HUN; 2; 2 | NÜR; 1; 2 | **NÜR**; **2**; 1 | **HOC**; **1**; 1 | HOC; 2; 1 | CAT; 1; 4 | CAT; 2; 4 | | | | 1st | 275.5 |

=== Complete F3 Asian Winter Series results ===
(key) (Races in bold indicate pole position; races in italics indicate points for the fastest lap of top ten finishers)

| Year | Entrant | 1 | 2 | 3 | 4 | 5 | 6 | 7 | 8 | 9 | DC | Points |
|---|---|---|---|---|---|---|---|---|---|---|---|---|
| 2019 | Dragon Hitech GP | CHA; 1 | CHA; 2 | CHA; 3 | SEP1; 1 Ret | SEP1; 2; 6 | SEP1; 3; 4 | SEP2; 1 | SEP2; 2 | SEP2; 3 | 11th | 20 |

=== Complete FIA Formula 3 Championship results ===
(key) (Races in bold indicate pole position; races in italics indicate points for the fastest lap of top ten finishers)

| Year | Entrant | 1 | 2 | 3 | 4 | 5 | 6 | 7 | 8 | 9 | 10 | 11 | 12 | 13 | 14 | 15 | 16 | 17 | 18 | DC | Points |
|---|---|---|---|---|---|---|---|---|---|---|---|---|---|---|---|---|---|---|---|---|---|
| 2019 | ART Grand Prix | CAT; FEA; 5 | CAT; SPR; 8 | LEC; FEA; Ret | LEC; SPR; 18 | RBR; FEA; 2 | RBR; SPR; 4 | SIL; FEA; 19 | SIL; SPR; 12 | HUN; FEA; 2 | HUN; SPR; 24 | SPA; FEA; 9 | SPA; SPR; Ret | MNZ; FEA; 14 | MNZ; SPR; 21 | SOC; FEA; 11 | SOC; SPR; 11 | | | 10th | 57 |
| 2020 | Hitech Grand Prix | RBR; FEA; 12 | RBR; SPR; 10 | RBR; FEA; 14 | RBR; SPR; 7 | HUN; FEA; 11 | HUN; SPR; 11 | SIL; FEA; Ret | SIL; SPR; 20 | SIL; FEA; 16 | SIL; SPR; 12 | CAT; FEA; 17 | CAT; SPR; Ret | SPA; FEA | SPA; SPR | MNZ; FEA | MNZ; SPR | MUG; FEA | MUG; SPR | 20th | 5 |

=== Complete Macau Grand Prix results ===
| Year | Team | Car | Qualifying | Quali Race | Main race |
|---|---|---|---|---|---|
| 2019 | (United Kingdom) Hitech Grand Prix | Dallara F3 2019 | 12th | 22nd | 18th |

Sporting positions
| Preceded by Lando Norris (MSA Formula) | F4 British Championship champion 2016 | Succeeded by Jamie Caroline |
| Preceded by Sacha Fenestraz | Formula Renault Eurocup champion 2018 | Succeeded by Oscar Piastri |
