= Neil Verhagen =

American racing driver (born 2001)

- Nationality: (United States) American
- Born: Neil Pierce Verhagen; February 18, 2001 (age 25) Ridgefield, Connecticut, United States

GTWC Europe Endurance Cup career
- Debut season: 2022
- Current team: BMW Junior Team - ROWE Racing
- Categorisation: FIA Silver (until 2022); FIA Gold (2023–)
- Car number: 26
- Starts: 203 starts
- Wins: 28 (28.14% of races)
- Podiums: 70 (37.13% of races)
- Poles: 14
- Fastest laps: 1
- Best finish: 11th in 2022

Previous series
- 2020-2021 2019 2017-18 2015-2016 2015: Nürburgring Endurance Series; BRDC British F3; Eurocup Formula Renault 2.0; F1600 Championship Series; F2000 Championship Series

Championship titles
- 2016 2026: F1600 Championship Series; IMSA SportsCar Championship - GTD Pro

Awards
- 2016 2026: Team USA Scholarship

Neil Pierce Verhagen (born February 18, 2001) is an American racing driver. He has been part of the BMW factory driver roster since 2023. His biggest career accolade is winning the 2026 24 Hours of Daytona as well as that year's IMSA Sportscar Championship in the GTD Pro class.

Verhagen competed in the SCCA National Championship Runoffs, having accomplished this in the Formula F category.

== Early career ==
=== Karting ===
Neil started indoor karting along with his brother Alex. The duo trained and raced at the Grand Prix New York facilities in Mount Kisco, New York, under the instruction of racing driver Stevan McAleer. McAleer raced many classes and won the 2015 Continental Tire Sports Car Challenge in the ST class. After racing at the Oakland Valley Race Park club scene, Verhagen joined the WKA and various Rotax Max racing series. In 2012, he finished second in the Florida Winter Tour Minimax series. Verhagen beat many hopefuls such as Logan Sargeant, Patricio O'Ward and Trenton Estep.

To increase their sons chances at a successful racing career, the Verhagen family moved form Ridgefield, Connecticut, to Mooresville, North Carolina, in 2014. The family exchanged the WKA scene for the United States Pro Kart Series.

=== Lower formulae ===
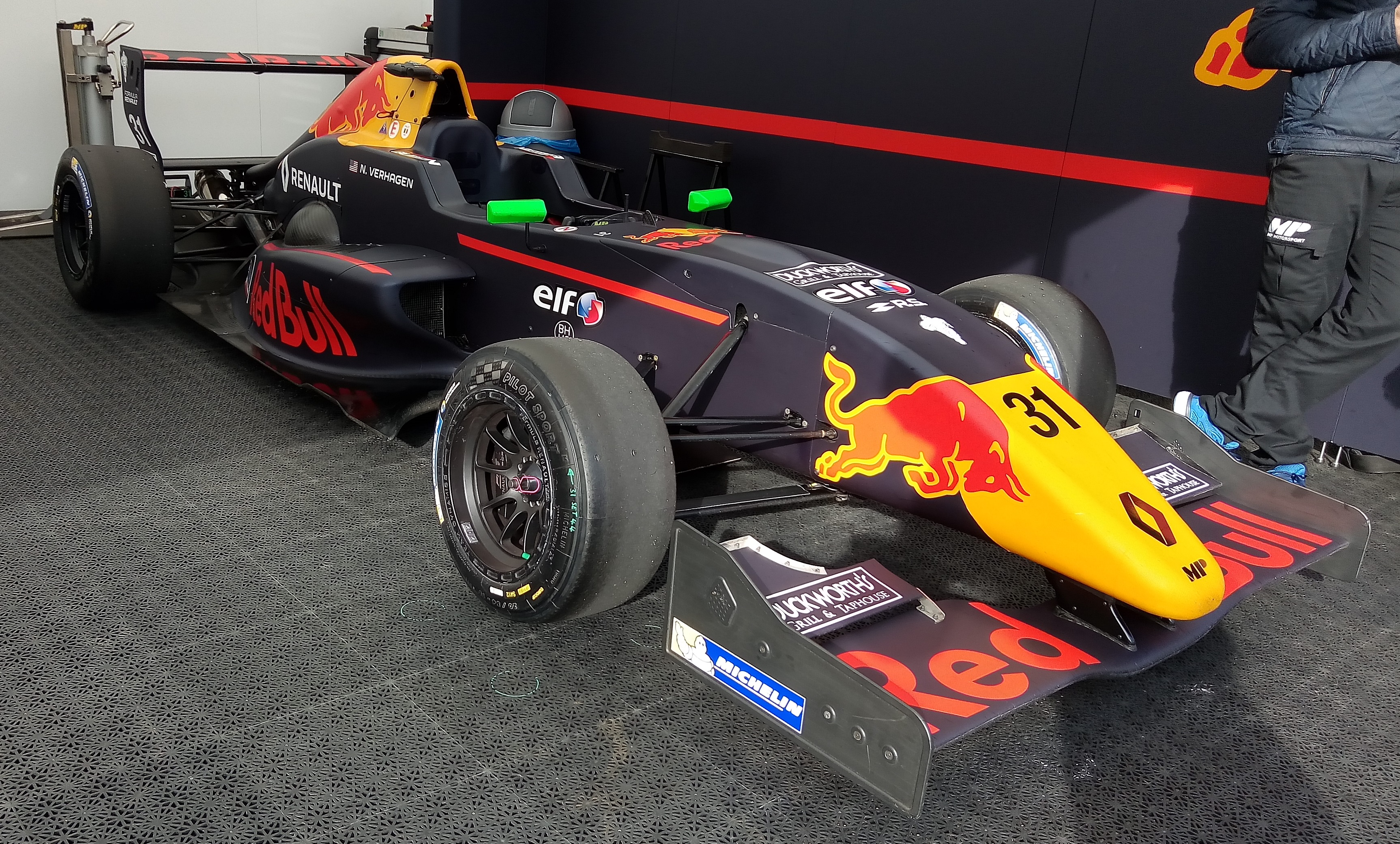
The Tatuus Formula Renault 2.0 car as raced by Neil Verhagen in the 2017 Eurocup Formula Renault 2.0 Spa-Francorchamps round.

Verhagen made his auto racing debut at Road Atlanta in the Skip Barber Winter Series. The young driver won the first three races of the championship at Road Atlanta and Sebring International Raceway. Verhagen, racing a Mazda powered Reynard chassis, finished second in the championship. Later in 2015, Verhagen debuted in the F1600 Championship Series. At the Pittsburgh International Race Complex Verhagen competed in a Spectrum. At the F2000 Championship Series finale at Pittsburgh, Verhagen finished tenth in a RFR F2000.

For 2016, Verhagen joined K-Hill Motorsports in the F1600 Championship Series. He won the championship beating teammate Peter Portante both racing Mygale SJ11 chassis. Verhagen also competed in the SCCA club racing scene. Winning the SCCA Majors Tour Northeast Conference, Verhagen qualified for the SCCA National Championship Runoffs. Verhagen went on to become the youngest driver to win the Runoffs at 15 years and 242 days. Winning the Runoffs, Verhagen qualified for the 2016 Mazda Road to Indy Shootout.

=== Formula Renault ===
In 2017, Verhagen was inducted into the Red Bull Junior Team and moved up to the Formula Renault Eurocup with MP Motorsport, alongside fellow Red Bull Junior Richard Verschoor. He had one podium at Hungaroring and finished the season eleventh, behind his Dutch teammate.

The following year, Verhagen returned to the Eurocup with Tech 1 Racing, where he finished the championship eleventh.

=== BRDC British F3 ===
In 2019, Verhagen lost his backing from Red Bull and moved to the BRDC British Formula 3 Championship with Double R Racing. He ended the season fifth overall, having taken seven podiums throughout the campaign.

== Sportscar career ==
=== 2020: Victorious GT debut ===
Verhagen moved to sportscar racing in 2020, driving for Walkenhorst Motorsport as part of the BMW Junior Team in two rounds of the Nürburgring Endurance Series. This included the 24 Hours of Nürburgring, which the American won in the SP8T category driving a BMW M4 GT4.

=== 2021: Nürburgring Endurance success ===
For the 2021 season, Verhagen stepped up to the SP9 Pro class to partner Daniel Harper and Max Hesse in a full-time campaign of the Nürburgring Langstrecken-Serie, where the trio would compete in a BMW M6 GT3 car. Verhagen ended up second in the standings, having taken two victories.

=== 2022-2024: GT World Challenge ===
The GT World Challenge Europe Endurance Cup would be Verhagen's destination in 2022, racing for the BMW Junior Team with ROWE Racing, once more alongside Harper and Hesse. After taking their first points in Imola with a fourth-placed finish, the trio ended up fifth in the 24 Hours of Spa, beating their teammates in the sister car. A further points finish at the Hockenheimring left the American eleventh in the championship, one place ahead of the more experienced line-up of the other Rowe Racing entry.

As a result of their accomplishments, Verhagen, Hesse and Harper were introduced as fully-fledged BMW works drivers before the 2023 season.

Following the retirement of John Edwards after the opening round of the 2023 GT World Challenge America Season, Neil would join Canadian team ST Racing for the remainder of the season. He would also continue racing with his Junior teammates in the GT World Challenge Europe Endurance Cup with ROWE, as well as compete in the 24 Hours of Nürburgring also with his Junior teammates. He would end the year with a win with ST Racing in race 2 at Road America, a win in NLS 3, and a podium at Monza in GTWC Europe.

Neil would continue full time with ST Racing in the 2024 GT World Challenge America season, this time taking 3 Wins 1 pole, and 10 podiums on a run that would land them 2nd in the championship by only a handful of points after a mechanical issue forced an early retirement from the final 8 hour round at Indianapolis. He would also race for Paul Miller Racing for the first time, joining the #1 Car for the 2024 IMSA Michelin Endurance Cup events, where he would be successful in winning the MEC championship.

=== 2025: Full-Time IMSA SportsCar Championship Debut ===
Following Bryan Sellers' step away from the driving side of racing, Neil would take on a full season programme with Paul Miller in the 2025 IMSA SportsCar Championship. The pair, however, would struggle and eventually finish behind fellow Junior team graduates, Dan Harper and Max Hesse, in the sister car. Having shown pace at times despite inconsistency, the pair would take a victory at the Road America event, and a further podium at the 12 Hours of Sebring.

=== 2026: IMSA Champions and Two 24H Class Wins ===
Verhagen took second during the 2026 Sahlen's Six Hours of The Glen

2026 would prove to be Neil's best year to date. Continuing his full time programme in IMSA with a new full season partner in Connor De Phillippi, they would start off strong with a win at the 2026 24 Hours of Daytona alongside Dan Harper and Max Hesse. While they would not win again for the rest of the season, a strong consistent run with 3 additional podiums and 3 further top 5 finishes in a highly competitive GTD Pro season was enough to earn both drivers their first IMSA SportsCar Championship, as well as wrapping up the MEC.

2026 would also see Neil drive the fan-favourite BMW M3 Touring 24H in the Nürburgring, taking 4th Overall and 1st in the SP-X Class.

== Racing record ==
=== Racing career summary ===
Season	Series	Team	Races	Wins	Poles	F/Laps	Podiums	Points	Position
2015	F1600 Championship Series	N/A	3	0	0	0	0	31	33rd
2015	F2000 Championship Series	N/A	1	0	0	0	0	21	37th
2015-16	Skip Barber Winter Series	N/A	2	0	0	0	1	53	19th
2016	F1600 Championship Series	K-Hill Motorsports	21	9	4	7	15	832	**1st**
2016-17	MRF Challenge Formula 2000 Championship	MRF Racing	4	0	0	0	0	11	15th
2017	Formula Renault Eurocup	MP Motorsport	23	0	0	0	1	59	11th
2017	Formula Renault NEC	MP Motorsport	5	1	0	0	1	47	14th
2018	Formula Renault Eurocup	Tech 1 Racing	20	0	0	0	0	59	11th
2018	Formula Renault NEC	Tech 1 Racing	10	0	0	0	0	31	13th
2019	BRDC British Formula 3 Championship	Double R Racing	24	0	1	0	7	357	5th
2020	Nürburgring Endurance Series - Cup 5	Walkenhorst Motorsport	2	1	0	0	1	15.83	20th
2020	24 Hours of Nürburgring - SP8T	Walkenhorst Motorsport	1	1	0	0	1	N/A	**1st**
2020	Nürburgring Endurance Series - SP8T	FK Performance Motorsport	3	0	0	0	1	11.25	4th
2021	24H GT Series - P4	BMW M Motorsport	1	1	0	0	1	0	NC†
2021	Nürburgring Endurance Series - SP9 Pro	BMW Junior Team	7	2	0	0	4	39.22	**2nd**
2021	24 Hours of Nürburgring - SP9	BMW Junior Team Shell	1	0	0	0	0	N/A	DNF
2022	GT World Challenge Europe Endurance Cup	BMW Junior Team with ROWE Racing	5	0	0	0	0	36	11th
2022	24 Hours of Nürburgring - SP9	BMW Junior Team Shell	1	0	0	0	0	N/A	DNF
2022	Nürburgring Endurance Series - SP9 Pro	BMW Junior Team	2	0	0	0	1	0	NC†
2022	Nürburgring Endurance Series - SP85	BMW M Motorsport	1	0	0	0	0	0	NC†
2023	GT World Challenge Europe Endurance Cup	ROWE Racing	5	0	0	0	1	33	10th
2023	Nürburgring Endurance Series - SP9 Pro	BMW Junior Team	3	1	0	0	2	0	NC†
2023	24 Hours of Nürburgring - SP9	BMW Junior Team	1	0	0	0	0	N/A	DNF
2023	Michelin Pilot Challenge - GS	Fast Track Racing	2	0	0	0	0	150	59th
2023	GT World Challenge America - Pro-Am	ST Racing	7	1	0	3	5	121	6th
2023	Intercontinental GT Challenge	ST Racing	1	0	0	0	0	4	28th
2023	ADAC GT Masters	FK Performance Motorsport	2	0	0	0	0	16	27th
2023	ESET Cup Endurance - GT3	Trevor Racing	1	0	0	0	0	12	4th*
2023	ESET Cup Sprint - GT3	Trevor Racing	2	1	1	0	2	43	**3rd***
2024	GT World Challenge America - Pro-Am	ST Racing	13	3	1	1	10	223	**2nd**
2024	24H Series - GT4	ST Racing							
2024	IMSA SportsCar Championship - GTD Pro	Paul Miller Racing	5	0	0	1	1	1400	15th
2025	IMSA SportsCar Championship - GTD Pro	Paul Miller Racing	10	1	1	1	2	2794	7th
2025	GT World Challenge Europe Endurance Cup	AlManar Racing by WRT	1	0	0	0	0	0	NC
2025	Intercontinental GT Challenge	AlManar Racing by WRT	1	0	0	0	0	4	30th
2025	Intercontinental GT Challenge	Team KRC	1	0	0	0	0	4	30th
2025	Nürburgring Langstrecken-Serie - SP8T	ST Racing							
2026	IMSA SportsCar Championship - GTD Pro	Paul Miller Racing	10	1	2	1	4	3012	**1st**
2026	GT World Challenge Asia	Team KRC	4	0	0	0	1	27	20th
2026	Nürburgring Langstrecken-Serie - SP-X	Schubert Motorsport							
2026	24 Hours of Nürburgring - SP-X	Schubert Motorsport	1	1	1	1	1	N/A	7th
2026	China GT Championship - GT3	TBC by 610Racing							
2026	GT World Challenge Europe Endurance Cup	Team WRT	2	0	0	0	1	18	19th

=== SCCA National Championship Runoffs ===
Year	Track	Car	Engine	Class	Finish	Start	Status
2016	Mid-Ohio	Mygale SJ11	Honda Fit	Formula F	1	1	Running

=== American Open-wheel racing results ===
(key) (Races in bold indicate pole position, races in italics indicate fastest race lap)

==== F1600 Championship Series ====
Year	Team	1	2	3	4	5	6	7	8	9	10	11	12	13	14	15	16	17	18	19	20	21	Rank	Points
2016	K-Hill Motorsports	ATL; 4	**ATL**; 1	ATL; 5	WGL; 3	WGL; 2	**WGL**; 2	VIR; 1	**VIR**; 4	VIR; 7	MOH; 2	MOH; 14	MOH; 1	PIT; 1	PIT; 1	**PIT**; 4	NJMP; 3	NJMP; 1	NJMP; 1	**VIR**; 1	VIR; 2	VIR; 1	1st	832

=== Complete Formula Renault NEC results ===
(key) (Races in bold indicate pole position) (Races in italics indicate fastest lap)

Year	Entrant	1	2	3	4	5	6	7	8	9	10	11	12	DC	Points
2017	MP Motorsport	MNZ; 1	MNZ; 2	ASS; 1; 1	ASS; 2; 4	NÜR; 1	NÜR; 2	SPA; 1; 8	SPA; 2; 8	SPA; 3; 5	HOC; 1	HOC; 2		14th	47
2018	Tech 1 Racing	PAU; 1; 6	PAU; 2; 5	MNZ; 1	MNZ; 2	SPA; 1; 25	SPA; 2; 22	HUN; 1; 14	HUN; 2; 14	NÜR; 1; 13	NÜR; 2; 12	HOC; 1; 7	HOC; 2; 6	13th	31

=== Complete Formula Renault Eurocup results ===
(key) (Races in bold indicate pole position) (Races in italics indicate fastest lap)

Year	Team	1	2	3	4	5	6	7	8	9	10	11	12	13	14	15	16	17	18	19	20	21	22	23	Pos	Points
2017	MP Motorsport	MNZ; 1; 17	MNZ; 2; 4	SIL; 1 Ret	SIL; 2; 16	PAU; 1 DNS	PAU; 2; 9	MON; 1; 12	MON; 2; 12	HUN; 1; 3	HUN; 2; 11	HUN; 3; 24	NÜR; 1; 18	NÜR; 2 Ret	RBR; 1; 18	RBR; 2; 25	LEC; 1; 7	LEC; 2; 12	SPA; 1; 8	SPA; 2; 8	SPA; 3; 5	CAT; 1; 7	CAT; 2 Ret	CAT; 3; 17	11th	59
2018	Tech 1 Racing	LEC; 1; 7	LEC; 2; 9	MNZ; 1; 11	MNZ; 2 Ret	SIL; 1; 10	SIL; 2; 12	MON; 1; 6	MON; 2; 7	RBR; 1; 4	RBR; 2; 8	SPA; 1; 25	SPA; 2; 22	HUN; 1; 14	HUN; 2; 14	NÜR; 1; 13	NÜR; 2; 12	HOC; 1; 7	HOC; 2; 6	CAT; 1; 7	CAT; 2; 7				11th	59

=== Complete BRDC British Formula 3 Championship results ===
(key) (Races in bold indicate pole position) (Races in italics indicate fastest lap)

Year	Team	1	2	3	4	5	6	7	8	9	10	11	12	13	14	15	16	17	18	19	20	21	22	23	24	Pos	Points
2019	Double R Racing	OUL; 1; 12	OUL; 2; 2	OUL; 3; 5	SNE; 1; 6	SNE; 2; 3^{8}	SNE; 3 Ret	SIL1; 1; 2	SIL1; 2; 15^{1}	**SIL1**; **3**; 5	DON1; 1; 6	DON1; 2; 8^{1}	DON1; 3; 7	SPA; 1; 18	SPA; 2; 3	SPA; 3; 5	BRH; 1; 8	BRH; 2; 4^{5}	BRH; 3; 7	SIL2; 1; 10	SIL2; 2; 15	SIL2; 3; 3	DON2; 1; 7	DON2; 2; 3^{6}	DON2; 3; 3	5th	357

=== Complete Nürburgring Langstrecken-Serie results ===
Year	Team	Car	Class	1	2	3	4	5	6	7	8	9	Pos.	Points
2020	FK Performance Motorsport	BMW M240i Racing	SP8T	NÜR; 1 Ret	NÜR; 2	NÜR; 3							4th	11.25
2020	Walkenhorst Motorsport	BMW M4 GT4	SP8T				NÜR; 4; 2	NÜR; 5; 4					4th	11.25
2020	Walkenhorst Motorsport	BMW M240i Racing	Cup 5	NÜR; 1	NÜR; 2; 5	NÜR; 3; 1	NÜR; 4	NÜR; 5					20th	15.83
2021	BMW Team RMG	BMW M6 GT3	SP9	NÜR; 1; 8	NÜR; 2 Ret	NÜR; 3; 1	NÜR; 4; 1	NÜR; 5 DNS	NÜR; 6; 2	NÜR; 7; 3	NÜR; 8 Ret		2nd	39.22
2022	BMW Junior Team	BMW M4 GT3	SP9	NÜR; 1; 9	NÜR; 2	NÜR; 3; 2	NÜR; 4	NÜR; 5	NÜR; 6	NÜR; 7	NÜR; 8	NÜR; 9	NC†	0
2022	BMW M Motorsport	BMW M4 GT4 Concept	SP85	NÜR; 1	NÜR; 2	NÜR; 3	NÜR; 4 Ret	NÜR; 5	NÜR; 6	NÜR; 7	NÜR; 8	NÜR; 9	NC	0
2023	BMW Junior Team	BMW M4 GT3	SP9	NÜR; 1; 5	NÜR; 2; 3	NÜR; 3; 1	NÜR; 4	NÜR; 5	NÜR; 6	NÜR; 7	NÜR; 8	NÜR; 9	NC†	0

^{†}As Verhagen was a guest driver, he was ineligible for points.

=== Complete 24 Hours of Nürburgring results ===
Year	Team	Co-Drivers	Car	Class	Laps	Ovr. Pos.	Class Pos.
2020	(Germany) Walkenhorst Motorsport	(United Kingdom) Dan Harper (Germany) Max Hesse	BMW M4 GT4	SP8T	78	19th	**1st**
2021	(Germany) BMW Junior Team Shell	(Brazil) Augusto Farfus (United Kingdom) Dan Harper (Germany) Max Hesse	BMW M4 GT3	SP9	54	DNF	DNF
2022	(Germany) BMW Junior Team Shell	(United Kingdom) Dan Harper (Germany) Max Hesse	BMW M4 GT3	SP9	86	DNF	DNF
2023	(Germany) BMW Junior Team	(United Kingdom) Dan Harper (Germany) Max Hesse	BMW M4 GT3	SP9	96	DNF	DNF
2026	(Germany) Schubert Motorsport	(United States) Connor De Phillippi (Germany) Jens Klingmann (Belgium) Ugo de Wilde	BMW M3 Touring 24H	SP-X	156	4th	1st

=== Complete GT World Challenge Europe Endurance Cup results ===
Year	Team	Car	Class	1	2	3	4	5	6	7	Pos.	Points
2022	ROWE Racing	BMW M4 GT3	Pro	IMO; 15	LEC; 4	SPA; 6H; 11	SPA; 12H; 2	SPA; 24H; 5	HOC; 9	CAT; 13	11th	36
2023	ROWE Racing	BMW M4 GT3	Pro	MNZ; 2	LEC; 6	SPA; 6H; 4	SPA; 12H; 53	SPA; 24H; Ret	NÜR; 11	CAT; 12	10th	33
2025	AlManar Racing by WRT	BMW M4 GT3 Evo	Gold	LEC	MNZ	SPA; 6H; 17	SPA; 12H; 21	SPA; 24H; 20	NÜR	CAT	13th	21
2026	Team WRT	BMW M4 GT3 Evo	Pro	LEC	MNZ	SPA; 6H	SPA; 12H	SPA; 24H	NÜR	ALG; 49	NC	0

^{*}Season still in progress.

=== Complete IMSA SportsCar Championship results ===
(key) (Races in bold indicate pole position; results in italics indicate fastest lap)

Year	Team	Class	Make	Engine	1	2	3	4	5	6	7	8	9	10	Pos.	Points
2024	Paul Miller Racing	GTD Pro	BMW M4 GT3	BMW P58 3.0 L Turbo I6	DAY; 3	SEB; 4	LGA	DET	WGL; 8	MOS	ELK	VIR	IMS; 8	PET; 7	15th	1400
2025	Paul Miller Racing	GTD Pro	BMW M4 GT3 Evo	BMW P58 3.0 L Turbo I6	DAY; 4	SEB; 3	LGA; 10	DET; 11	WGL; 7	**MOS**; 6	ELK; 1	VIR; 6	IMS; 8	PET; 9	7th	2794
2026	Paul Miller Racing	GTD Pro	BMW M4 GT3 Evo	BMW P58 3.0 L Turbo I6	DAY; 1	SEB; 5	LGA; 8	DET; 4	WGL; 2	**MOS**; 3	ELK; 11	VIR; 5	IMS; 6	**PET**; 3	1st	3012
