= 2017 Formula Renault Eurocup =

Motor racing competition

The 2017 Formula Renault Eurocup was a multi-event motor racing championship for open wheel, formula racing cars held across Europe. The championship featured drivers competing in 2 litre Formula Renault single seat race cars that conformed to the technical regulations for the championship. The 2017 season was the 27th Formula Renault Eurocup season organized by the Renault Sport and the second season as the main category of the World Series by Renault. The series would visit ten circuits around Europe, including Monaco.

== Teams and drivers ==
Twelve teams were preselected on 12 September 2016. ASM Motorsport, Cram Motorsport and Duqueine Engineering were dropped from the final teams' list that was published on 9 November 2016.

Team	No.	Driver name	Status	Rounds
(Germany) Josef Kaufmann Racing	1	(China) Yifei Ye	R	All
(Germany) Josef Kaufmann Racing	2	(Australia) Luis Leeds	R	All
(Germany) Josef Kaufmann Racing	11	(France) Sacha Fenestraz		All
(France) Tech 1 Racing	4	(France) Gabriel Aubry		All
(France) Tech 1 Racing	5	(Australia) Thomas Maxwell	R	All
(France) Tech 1 Racing	6	(France) Thomas Neubauer	R	All
(France) Tech 1 Racing	7	(United Kingdom) Max Fewtrell	R	All
(France) R-ace GP	8	(United Kingdom) Will Palmer		All
(France) R-ace GP	9	(Belgium) Max Defourny		All
(France) R-ace GP	10	(Russia) Robert Shwartzman		All
(France) R-ace GP	12	(Mexico) Raúl Guzmán	R	All
(France) R-ace GP	40	(France) Charles Milesi	G	6, 8–10
(France) R-ace GP	41	(France) Théo Coicaud	G	6, 8–9
(France) R-ace GP	42	(Morocco) Michael Benyahia	G	8–9
(France) R-ace GP	43	(United States) Logan Sargeant	G	10
(France) R-ace GP	44	(Belgium) Gilles Magnus	G	9
(Spain) AVF by Adrián Vallés	13	(Portugal) Henrique Chaves		All
(Spain) AVF by Adrián Vallés	14	(Peru) Rodrigo Pflucker		1–5
(Spain) AVF by Adrián Vallés	14	(Spain) Xavier Lloveras	R	7–10
(Spain) AVF by Adrián Vallés	15	(Mexico) Axel Matus	R	All
(Spain) AVF by Adrián Vallés	16	(Switzerland) Gregoire Saucy	R	1–4
(Spain) AVF by Adrián Vallés	16	(Australia) Thomas Randle	R	5–10
(United Kingdom) Fortec Motorsports	17	(Australia) Alex Peroni		All
(United Kingdom) Fortec Motorsports	18	(Russia) Aleksey Korneev		All
(United Kingdom) Fortec Motorsports	19	(United Kingdom) Frank Bird	R	All
(United Kingdom) Fortec Motorsports	20	(Malaysia) Najiy Razak		All
(Italy) JD Motorsport	21	(China) Sun Yueyang	R	All
(Italy) JD Motorsport	22	(France) Jean-Baptiste Simmenauer	R	All
(Italy) JD Motorsport	23	(Russia) Aleksandr Vartanyan	R	All
(United Kingdom) Mark Burdett Motorsport	25	(Poland) Julia Pankiewicz		All
(United Kingdom) Mark Burdett Motorsport	26	(Indonesia) Presley Martono	R	All
(Netherlands) MP Motorsport	29	(Netherlands) Richard Verschoor	R	All
(Netherlands) MP Motorsport	30	(Netherlands) Jarno Opmeer	R	All
(Netherlands) MP Motorsport	31	(United States) Neil Verhagen	R	All
(United Kingdom) Arden	33	(United Kingdom) Dan Ticktum	R	All
(United Kingdom) Arden	34	(Belgium) Ghislain Cordeel		1–7, 10
(United Kingdom) Arden	93	(Australia) Zane Goddard	R	All
(Poland) BM Racing Team	96	(Poland) Bartłomiej Mirecki	G	5, 9

Icon	Status
R	Rookie
G	Guest

=== Driver changes ===
- French F4 champion Yifei Ye and 2016 F4 British Championship driver Luis Leeds made their Eurocup debut with Josef Kaufmann Racing. They were partnered by Sacha Fenestraz who left Tech 1 Racing. While Eurocup champion Lando Norris and his teammate Jehan Daruvala, who raced for Josef Kaufmann racing in 2016, stepped up to 2017 FIA Formula 3 European Championship.
- F4 British Champion Max Fewtrell, 2016 BRDC British Formula 3 Championship driver Thomas Maxwell and 2016 V de V Challenge Monoplace driver Thomas Neubauer joined Tech 1 Racing. While 2016 Tech 1 regular Dorian Boccolacci moved to 2017 GP3 Series. Another 2016 Tech 1 regular Hugo de Sadeleer left single-seaters to join United Autosports in LMP2 class of the 2017 European Le Mans Series.
- French F4 Championship driver Raúl Guzmán competed for R-ace GP, he was joined in the team by Robert Shwartzman, who previously raced for Josef Kaufmann Racing. While 2016 R-ace GP racer Julien Falchero graduated to GP3 Series.
- Panam GP Series champion Axel Matus and V de V Challenge Monoplace driver Gregoire Saucy made their debuts for AVF by Adrián Vallés. They was joined by Rodrigo Pflucker who has competed two rounds with Cram Motorsport. 2016 AVF regular Harrison Scott decided to switch to 2017 Euroformula Open Championship.
- V de V Challenge Monoplace champion Alex Peroni and 2016 Asian Formula Renault Series driver Najiy Razak made their Eurocup debut with Fortec Motorsports. Aleksey Korneev switched from JD Motorsport to Fortec. While Bruno Baptista and Ferdinand Habsburg, who raced for Fortec in 2016 moved to GP3 Series and FIA Formula 3 European Championship respectively.
- JD Motorsport signed all-rookie line-up with Sun Yueyang and Jean-Baptiste Simmenauer who jumped straight from the karting. They also took 2016 SMP F4 Championship driver Aleksandr Vartanyan, who also have contested 2016 Eurocup finale with Fortec. James Allen who raced for JD Motorsport in 2016 decided to switch to sports car racing, joining Graff Racing
- Mark Burdett Motorsport team were joined by Formula 4 South East Asia champion Presley Martono and 2016 Formula Renault 2.0 Northern European Cup driver Julia Pankiewicz.
- MP Motorsport squad was staffed by SMP F4 and F4 Spanish champion Richard Verschoor, F1600 Championship Series driver and another Red Bull Junior Neil Verhagen and Verschoor's SMP F4 title rival Jarno Opmeer.
- Arden signed with Red Bull Junior driver Dan Ticktum, Formula Renault 2.0 NEC driver Ghislain Cordeel and F4 British Championship driver Zane Goddard.

== Race calendar ==
The provisional calendar for the 2017 season was announced on 17 October 2016. The series will return Silverstone Circuit, Hungaroring, Nürburgring and Circuit de Barcelona-Catalunya and add Pau Circuit in its schedule. While Ciudad del Motor de Aragón for the first time since 2009 will be not present in the 2017 calendar, as well as 2016 returnee Autódromo Fernanda Pires da Silva. On 3 February 2017 was confirmed the number of the races during the rounds.

Round		Circuit	Date	Supporting
1	R1	(Italy) Autodromo Nazionale Monza, Monza	22 April	Blancpain GT Series Endurance Cup
1	R2	(Italy) Autodromo Nazionale Monza, Monza	23 April	Blancpain GT Series Endurance Cup
2	R1	(United Kingdom) Silverstone Circuit, Silverstone	13 May	Blancpain GT Series Endurance Cup
2	R2	(United Kingdom) Silverstone Circuit, Silverstone	14 May	Blancpain GT Series Endurance Cup
3	R1	(France) Pau Circuit, Pau	20 May	Pau Grand Prix
3	R2	(France) Pau Circuit, Pau	21 May	Pau Grand Prix
4	R1	Circuit de Monaco, Monte-Carlo	27 May	Monaco Grand Prix
4	R2	Circuit de Monaco, Monte-Carlo	28 May	Monaco Grand Prix
5	R1	(Hungary) Hungaroring, Mogyoród	1 July	International GT Open; Euroformula Open Championship
5	R2	(Hungary) Hungaroring, Mogyoród	2 July	International GT Open; Euroformula Open Championship
5	R3	(Hungary) Hungaroring, Mogyoród	2 July	International GT Open; Euroformula Open Championship
6	R1	(Germany) Nürburgring, Nürburg	15 July	FIA World Endurance Championship
6	R2	(Germany) Nürburgring, Nürburg	16 July	FIA World Endurance Championship
7	R1	(Austria) Red Bull Ring, Spielberg	22 July	European Le Mans Series
7	R2	(Austria) Red Bull Ring, Spielberg	23 July	European Le Mans Series
8	R1	(France) Circuit Paul Ricard, Le Castellet	26 August	European Le Mans Series
8	R2	(France) Circuit Paul Ricard, Le Castellet	27 August	European Le Mans Series
9	R1	(Belgium) Circuit de Spa-Francorchamps, Spa	23 September	European Le Mans Series
9	R2	(Belgium) Circuit de Spa-Francorchamps, Spa	23 September	European Le Mans Series
9	R3	(Belgium) Circuit de Spa-Francorchamps, Spa	24 September	European Le Mans Series
10	R1	(Spain) Circuit de Barcelona-Catalunya, Montmeló	28 October	International GT Open
10	R2	(Spain) Circuit de Barcelona-Catalunya, Montmeló	29 October	International GT Open
10	R3	(Spain) Circuit de Barcelona-Catalunya, Montmeló	29 October	International GT Open

== Results ==
Round		Circuit	Pole position	Fastest lap	Winning driver	Winning team	Rookie winner
1	R1	(Italy) Autodromo Nazionale Monza	(Russia) Robert Shwartzman	(France) Sacha Fenestraz	(Russia) Robert Shwartzman	(France) R-ace GP	(United Kingdom) Max Fewtrell
1	R2	(Italy) Autodromo Nazionale Monza	(France) Gabriel Aubry	(France) Sacha Fenestraz	(United Kingdom) Will Palmer	(France) R-ace GP	(United States) Neil Verhagen
2	R1	(United Kingdom) Silverstone Circuit	(Belgium) Max Defourny	(United Kingdom) Will Palmer	(United Kingdom) Will Palmer	(France) R-ace GP	(United Kingdom) Max Fewtrell
2	R2	(United Kingdom) Silverstone Circuit	(Russia) Robert Shwartzman	(Russia) Robert Shwartzman	(Russia) Robert Shwartzman	(France) R-ace GP	(United Kingdom) Dan Ticktum
3	R1	(France) Pau Circuit	(Russia) Robert Shwartzman	(Russia) Robert Shwartzman	(Russia) Robert Shwartzman	(France) R-ace GP	(United Kingdom) Max Fewtrell
3	R2	(France) Pau Circuit	(Australia) Alex Peroni	(Russia) Robert Shwartzman	(Australia) Alex Peroni	(United Kingdom) Fortec Motorsports	(United Kingdom) Max Fewtrell
4	R1	Circuit de Monaco	(United Kingdom) Will Palmer	(Belgium) Max Defourny	(United Kingdom) Will Palmer	(France) R-ace GP	(United Kingdom) Dan Ticktum
4	R2	Circuit de Monaco	(France) Sacha Fenestraz	(Belgium) Max Defourny	(France) Sacha Fenestraz	(Germany) Josef Kaufmann Racing	(United Kingdom) Dan Ticktum
5	R1	(Hungary) Hungaroring	(United Kingdom) Dan Ticktum	(United Kingdom) Dan Ticktum	(United Kingdom) Dan Ticktum	(United Kingdom) Arden	(United Kingdom) Dan Ticktum
5	R2	(Hungary) Hungaroring	(France) Sacha Fenestraz	(China) Yifei Ye	(France) Gabriel Aubry	(France) Tech 1 Racing	(United Kingdom) Max Fewtrell
5	R3	(Hungary) Hungaroring	(France) Gabriel Aubry	(France) Gabriel Aubry	(France) Gabriel Aubry	(France) Tech 1 Racing	(China) Yifei Ye
6	R1	(Germany) Nürburgring	(Russia) Robert Shwartzman	(Belgium) Max Defourny	(Russia) Robert Shwartzman	(France) R-ace GP	(United Kingdom) Dan Ticktum
6	R2	(Germany) Nürburgring	(France) Sacha Fenestraz	(France) Sacha Fenestraz	(France) Sacha Fenestraz	(Germany) Josef Kaufmann Racing	(United Kingdom) Dan Ticktum
7	R1	(Austria) Red Bull Ring	(Belgium) Max Defourny	(United Kingdom) Dan Ticktum	(United Kingdom) Max Fewtrell	(France) Tech 1 Racing	(United Kingdom) Max Fewtrell
7	R2	(Austria) Red Bull Ring	(France) Sacha Fenestraz	(France) Sacha Fenestraz	(France) Sacha Fenestraz	(Germany) Josef Kaufmann Racing	(United Kingdom) Max Fewtrell
8	R1	(France) Circuit Paul Ricard	(France) Sacha Fenestraz	(Russia) Robert Shwartzman	(Belgium) Max Defourny	(France) R-ace GP	(China) Yifei Ye
8	R2	(France) Circuit Paul Ricard	(Russia) Robert Shwartzman	(Belgium) Max Defourny	(France) Sacha Fenestraz	(Germany) Josef Kaufmann Racing	(United Kingdom) Dan Ticktum
9	R1	(Belgium) Circuit de Spa-Francorchamps	(France) Sacha Fenestraz	(Morocco) Michael Benyahia (Note: The fastest lap by Eurocup regular was achieved by Luis Leeds.)	(France) Sacha Fenestraz	(Germany) Josef Kaufmann Racing	(China) Yifei Ye
9	R2	(Belgium) Circuit de Spa-Francorchamps	(France) Sacha Fenestraz	(Belgium) Max Defourny	(France) Gabriel Aubry	(France) Tech 1 Racing	(United Kingdom) Max Fewtrell
9	R3	(Belgium) Circuit de Spa-Francorchamps	(France) Sacha Fenestraz	(France) Sacha Fenestraz	(France) Sacha Fenestraz	(Germany) Josef Kaufmann Racing	(United States) Neil Verhagen
10	R1	(Spain) Circuit de Barcelona-Catalunya	(Russia) Robert Shwartzman	(Russia) Robert Shwartzman	(Russia) Robert Shwartzman	(France) R-ace GP	(Netherlands) Richard Verschoor
10	R2	(Spain) Circuit de Barcelona-Catalunya	(Russia) Robert Shwartzman	(Russia) Robert Shwartzman	(Russia) Robert Shwartzman	(France) R-ace GP	(Netherlands) Richard Verschoor
10	R3	(Spain) Circuit de Barcelona-Catalunya	(France) Sacha Fenestraz	(Russia) Robert Shwartzman	(France) Sacha Fenestraz	(Germany) Josef Kaufmann Racing	(Netherlands) Richard Verschoor

== Championship standings ==
The first race at Spa which held in fog conditions was red-flagged after three laps were completed behind the safety car, but before 75% of the scheduled distance in laps, the necessary distance required for a race to pay full points. Race paid half points to all classified finishers.

Points system

Points were awarded to the top 10 classified finishers.

Position	1st	2nd	3rd	4th	5th	6th	7th	8th	9th	10th
Points	25	18	15	12	10	8	6	4	2	1

=== Drivers' championship ===
(key)

Pos.	Driver	MNZ (Italy)		SIL (United Kingdom)		PAU (France)		MON (Monaco)		HUN (Hungary)			NÜR (Germany)		RBR (Austria)		LEC (France)		SPA (Belgium)			CAT (Spain)			Points
Pos.	Driver	R1	R2	R1	R2	R1	R2	R1	R2	R1	R2	R3	R1	R2	R1	R2	R1	R2	R1	R2	R3	R1	R2	R3	Points
1	(France) Sacha Fenestraz	2	2	5	Ret	6	2	2	1	2	3	8	3	1	2	1	Ret	1	1	3	1	4	2	1	367.5
2	(United Kingdom) Will Palmer	4	1	1	2	4	4	1	3	18	2	4	8	5	12	2	3	4	9	6	2	2	6	4	298
3	(Russia) Robert Shwartzman	1	Ret	3	1	1	3	4	2	7	5	2	1	8	6	9	23	DSQ	2	25	Ret	1	1	2	285
4	(Belgium) Max Defourny	5	3	Ret	12	2	6	3	4	14	4	3	2	6	3	8	1	2	4	2	3	6	Ret	3	255
5	(France) Gabriel Aubry	3	Ret	8	Ret	3	7	7	7	4	1	1	9	4	5	3	15	3	6	1	4	3	Ret	6	232
6	(United Kingdom) Max Fewtrell	8	8	4	4	7	5	16	13	13	6	9	6	7	1	4	5	6	5	4	9	Ret	4	7	164
7	(United Kingdom) Dan Ticktum	11	Ret	10	3	10	Ret	5	5	1	9	7	4	2	9	5	Ret	5	18	11	7	20	7	12	134
8	(China) Yifei Ye	9	6	9	14	8	10	11	19	24	7	5	7	3	8	7	2	8	3	7	8	12	10	11	106.5
9	(Netherlands) Richard Verschoor	10	7	7	6	13	8	8	8	Ret	25	18	20	14	11	26	4	7	7	12	Ret	5	3	5	89
10	(Australia) Alex Peroni	6	Ret	6	21	5	1	6	6	Ret	12	19	13	15	14	12	24	Ret	15	16	15	18	11	8	72
11	(United States) Neil Verhagen	17	4	Ret	16	DNS	9	12	12	3	11	24	18	Ret	18	25	7	12	8	8	5	7	Ret	17	59
12	(Portugal) Henrique Chaves	7	Ret	2	Ret	Ret	Ret	17	Ret	6	17	16	5	Ret	7	10	Ret	Ret	12	9	14	11	12	16	53
13	(Russia) Aleksandr Vartanyan	14	9	11	25	12	23	10	9	5	8	6	12	23	16	15	8	Ret	22	19	10	10	8	18	42
14	(Australia) Thomas Randle									Ret	13	10	11	9	4	6	9	10	10	5	11	DSQ	Ret	14	39.5
15	(Netherlands) Jarno Opmeer	18	21	Ret	15	11	22	13	Ret	8	14	12	16	16	13	Ret	11	11	11	10	6	16	5	9	27
16	(Australia) Thomas Maxwell	13	5	22	8	15	13	25	14	Ret	24	22	23	18	15	Ret	13	17	13	13	12	13	Ret	13	14
17	(Mexico) Raúl Guzmán	22	10	12	5	9	11	19	22	12	16	13	21	13	22	18	12	13	16	32	16	26	Ret	22	13
18	(Russia) Aleksey Korneev	20	14	14	9	17	14	9	10	15	10	11	17	19	10	14	DNS	23	19	15	21	17	16	10	8
19	(Australia) Luis Leeds	25	Ret	23	7	18	16	14	11	Ret	Ret	26	14	10	19	24	18	18	29	23	Ret	29	Ret	23	7
20	(Australia) Zane Goddard	15	20	13	13	19	15	18	17	9	15	17	10	11	29	16	10	28	24	18	13	15	Ret	DNS	5
21	(Indonesia) Presley Martono	16	Ret	15	10	16	Ret	Ret	15	16	21	21	24	25	23	Ret	Ret	27	20	17	17	22	15	Ret	1
22	(Malaysia) Najiy Razak	21	18	24	26	23	19	DNQ	23	10	19	Ret	27	20	24	22	Ret	22	33	28	27	27	Ret	DNS	1
23	(France) Thomas Neubauer	23	11	18	17	24	24	Ret	Ret	17	27	15	15	Ret	17	11	16	14	25	33	29	Ret	Ret	19	0
24	(Mexico) Axel Matus	26	13	26	11	14	12	24	18	22	26	23	19	12	Ret	Ret	Ret	15	17	14	19	14	14	21	0
25	(Belgium) Ghislain Cordeel	Ret	Ret	21	19	Ret	18	21	16	11	23	25	25	Ret	28	21						23	17	Ret	0
26	(Switzerland) Gregoire Saucy	12	12	Ret	DNS	DNS	DNS	20	DNS																0
27	(France) Jean-Baptiste Simmenauer	24	19	25	20	Ret	20	22	DNQ	20	18	14	22	17	20	13	20	20	26	22	24	21	Ret	DNS	0
28	(Spain) Xavier Lloveras														27	19	19	19	21	21	22	19	13	15	0
29	(Peru) Rodrigo Pflucker	Ret	Ret	19	18	21	Ret	15	21	WD	WD	WD													0
30	(Poland) Julia Pankiewicz	Ret	15	20	23	22	25	DNQ	20	21	29	29	28	26	26	20	Ret	26	31	29	28	28	Ret	25	0
31	(China) Sun Yueyang	27	16	16	24	Ret	21	23	DNQ	19	28	28	26	21	21	17	21	24	34	26	Ret	25	Ret	24	0
32	(United Kingdom) Frank Bird	19	17	17	22	20	17	Ret	Ret	23	22	27	29	24	25	23	22	25	32	27	20	24	Ret	20	0
guest drivers ineligible to score points
	(France) Charles Milesi												Ret	Ret			6	9	23	20	Ret	9	Ret	DNS	0
	(United States) Logan Sargeant																					8	9	Ret	0
	(Morocco) Michael Benyahia																14	15	27	24	23				0
	(Belgium) Gilles Magnus																		14	Ret	18				0
	(France) Théo Coicaud												30	22			17	21	28	31	25				0
	(Poland) Bartłomiej Mirecki									Ret	20	20							30	30	26				0
Pos.	Driver	R1	R2	R1	R2	R1	R2	R1	R2	R1	R2	R3	R1	R2	R1	R2	R1	R2	R1	R2	R3	R1	R2	R3	Points
Pos.	Driver	MNZ (Italy)		SIL (United Kingdom)		PAU (France)		MON (Monaco)		HUN (Hungary)			NÜR (Germany)		RBR (Austria)		LEC (France)		SPA (Belgium)			CAT (Spain)			Points

=== Teams' championship ===
Only two best-finishing cars are allowed to score points in the championship.

Pos.	Team	MNZ (Italy)		SIL (United Kingdom)		PAU (France)		MON (Monaco)		HUN (Hungary)			NÜR (Germany)		RBR (Austria)		LEC (France)		SPA (Belgium)			CAT (Spain)			Points
Pos.	Team	R1	R2	R1	R2	R1	R2	R1	R2	R1	R2	R3	R1	R2	R1	R2	R1	R2	R1	R2	R3	R1	R2	R3	Points
1	(France) R-ace GP	1	1	1	1	1	3	1	2	7	2	2	1	5	3	2	1	2	2	2	2	1	1	2	731
1	(France) R-ace GP	4	3	3	2	2	4	3	3	12	4	3	2	6	6	8	3	4	4	6	3	2	6	3	731
2	(Germany) Josef Kaufmann Racing	2	2	5	7	6	2	2	1	2	3	5	3	1	2	1	2	1	1	3	1	4	2	1	480
2	(Germany) Josef Kaufmann Racing	9	6	9	14	8	10	11	11	24	7	8	7	3	8	7	18	8	3	7	8	12	10	11	480
3	(France) Tech 1 Racing	3	5	4	4	3	5	7	7	4	1	1	6	4	1	3	5	3	5	1	4	3	4	6	410
3	(France) Tech 1 Racing	8	8	8	8	7	7	16	13	13	6	9	9	7	5	4	13	6	6	4	9	13	Ret	7	410
4	(Netherlands) MP Motorsport	10	4	7	6	11	8	8	8	3	11	12	16	14	11	25	4	7	7	8	5	5	3	5	174
4	(Netherlands) MP Motorsport	17	7	Ret	15	13	9	12	12	8	14	18	18	16	13	26	7	11	8	10	6	7	5	9	174
5	(United Kingdom) Arden	11	20	10	3	10	15	5	5	1	9	7	4	2	9	5	10	5	18	11	7	15	7	12	139
5	(United Kingdom) Arden	15	Ret	13	13	19	18	18	16	9	15	17	10	11	28	16	Ret	28	24	18	13	20	17	Ret	139
6	(Spain) AVF by Adrián Vallés	7	12	2	11	14	12	15	18	6	13	10	5	9	4	6	9	10	10	5	11	11	12	16	92.5
6	(Spain) AVF by Adrián Vallés	12	13	19	18	21	Ret	17	21	23	17	16	11	12	7	10	19	16	12	9	14	14	13	15	92.5
7	(United Kingdom) Fortec Motorsports	6	14	6	9	5	1	6	6	10	10	11	13	15	10	12	22	22	15	15	15	18	11	8	81
7	(United Kingdom) Fortec Motorsports	19	17	14	21	17	14	9	10	15	12	19	17	19	14	14	24	23	19	16	20	17	16	10	81
8	(Italy) JD Motorsport	14	9	11	20	12	20	10	9	5	8	6	12	17	16	13	8	20	22	19	10	10	8	18	42
8	(Italy) JD Motorsport	24	16	16	24	Ret	21	22	DNQ	19	18	14	22	23	20	15	20	24	26	22	24	21	Ret	24	42
9	(United Kingdom) Mark Burdett Motorsport	Ret	15	15	10	16	25	Ret	15	16	21	21	24	25	23	20	Ret	26	20	17	17	22	15	25	1
9	(United Kingdom) Mark Burdett Motorsport	16	Ret	20	23	22	Ret	DNQ	20	21	29	29	28	26	26	Ret	Ret	27	31	29	28	28	Ret	Ret	1
guest teams ineligible to score points
	(Poland) BM Racing Team									Ret	20	20							30	30	26				0
Pos.	Driver	R1	R2	R1	R2	R1	R2	R1	R2	R1	R2	R3	R1	R2	R1	R2	R1	R2	R1	R2	R3	R1	R2	R3	Points
Pos.	Driver	MNZ (Italy)		SIL (United Kingdom)		PAU (France)		MON (Monaco)		HUN (Hungary)			NÜR (Germany)		RBR (Austria)		LEC (France)		SPA (Belgium)			CAT (Spain)			Points
