= Alexander Smolyar =

Russian racing driver

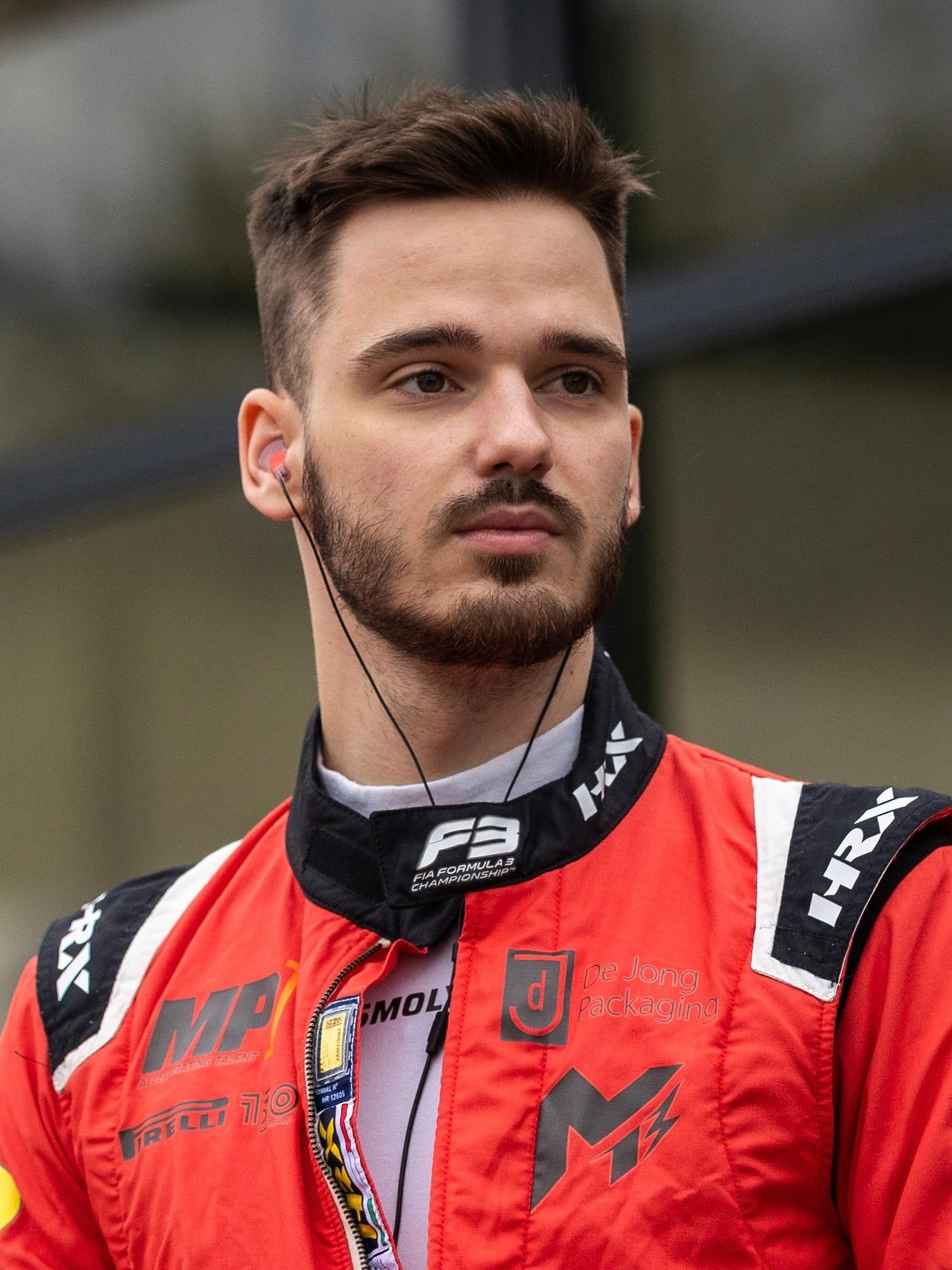
- Smolyar in 2022
- Nationality: (Russia) Russian
- Born: Alexander Alexandrovich Smolyar; 19 July 2001 (age 25) Yuzhno-Sakhalinsk, Russia

FIA Formula 3 Championship career
- Debut season: 2020
- Current team: MP Motorsport
- Car number: 11
- Former teams: ART Grand Prix
- Starts: 54 (55 entries)
- Wins: 3
- Podiums: 8
- Poles: 3
- Fastest laps: 2
- Best finish: 6th in 2021

Previous series
- 2018–19 2018 2017 2017: Formula Renault Eurocup; Formula Renault NEC; F4 Spanish Championship; SMP F4 NEZ Championship

Alexander Alexandrovich Smolyar (Russian: Александр Александрович Смоляр; born 19 July 2001) is a Russian racing driver who currently competes in the 2026 Russian Circuit Racing Series, driving for SMP Racing. He previously competed in the FIA Formula 3 Championship in 2020, 2021 and 2022.

== Racing career ==
=== Lower formulae ===
2017 was Smolyar's debut season in single-seater racing. He competed for SMP Racing in the Spanish and Russian Formula 4 Championships, finishing third in both. He scored a total of 24 podiums, with all of his race wins coming in the Spanish Championship.

=== Formula Renault Eurocup ===
==== 2018 ====
In the following two years, Smolyar raced in the Formula Renault Eurocup. In his debut campaign, driving for Tech 1 Racing, Smolyar finished 12th in the standings, beating out two of his three teammates and helping the team to finish fifth in the team championship.

==== 2019 ====
Smolyar's 2019 season would prove to be much more successful. He finished third and won three races, only being beaten in the championship by Frenchman Victor Martins and his R-ace GP teammate, Oscar Piastri.

=== FIA Formula 3 Championship ===
==== 2020 ====
Smolyar was signed by ART Grand Prix to drive for them in the 2020 Formula 3 Championship alongside ADAC F4 champion Théo Pourchaire and Sebastián Fernández. Despite a slew of strong performances, which included a pole position at the Hungaroring and a win on the road at the first round in Britain the Russian's season was plagued with bad luck. This included having his win taken away by a penalty for weaving on the Hangar straight as well as a collision at the first corner in Budapest. Smolyar scored his only podium of the season in the second race at Monza and ended up eleventh in the standings, behind eventual runner-up Pourchaire, but ahead of his more experienced teammate Fernández.

==== 2021 ====
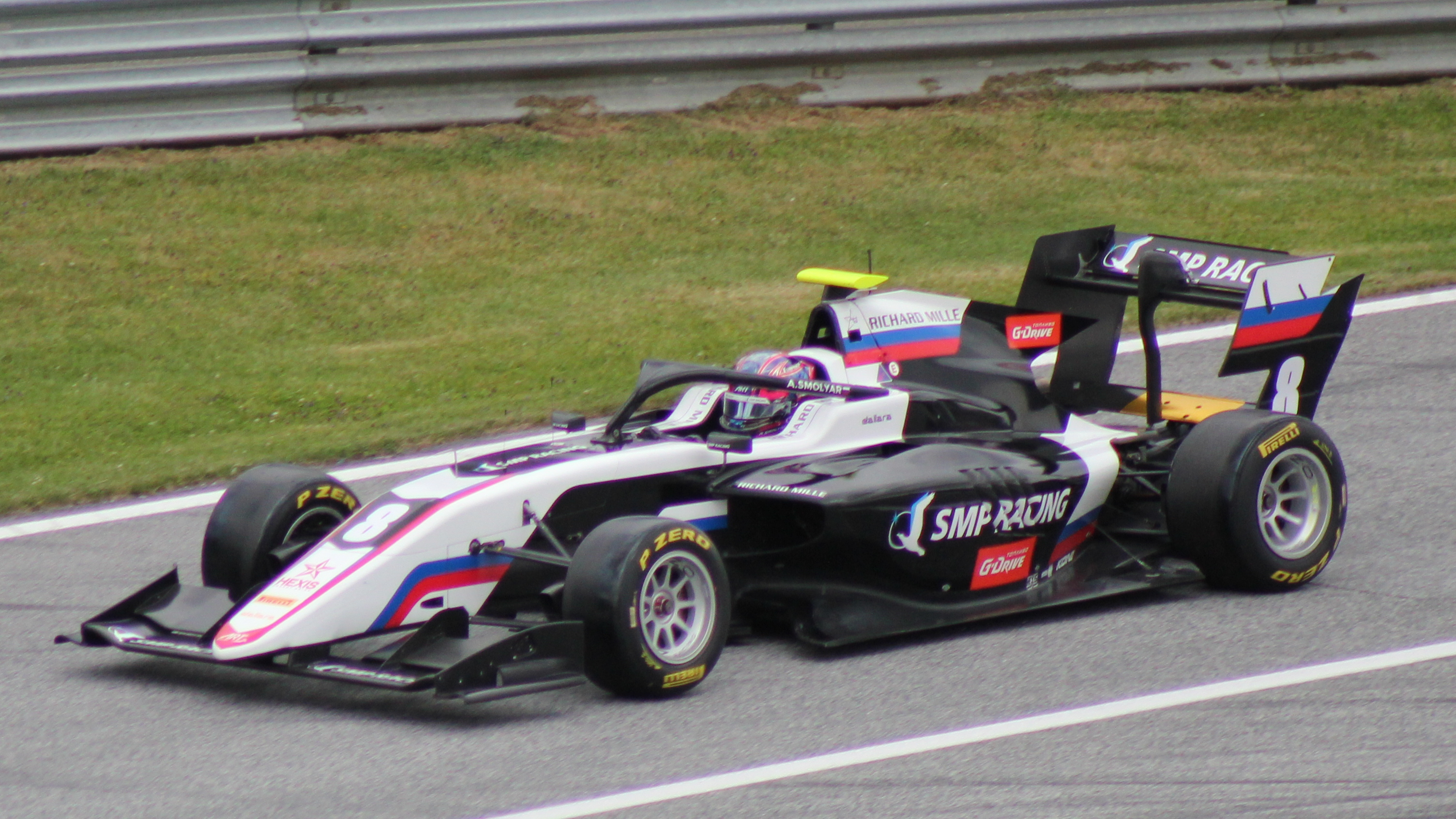
Smolyar driving the Dallara F3 2019 during the 2021 Spielberg Formula 3 round.

For the 2021 season, Smolyar re-signed with ART, this time partnering Frederik Vesti and racing returnee Juan Manuel Correa. Smolyar's start to the season was strong, with him taking his first Formula 3 victory in the first race of the opening weekend. He then continued his good form and came out victorious in race one at the Circuit Paul Ricard, after having battled from sixth on the grid to first on the final lap. Smolyar finished the season with a total of 106 points, placing sixth in the championship. During that season, he scored a total of two wins, two fastest laps, and four podiums.

==== 2022 ====
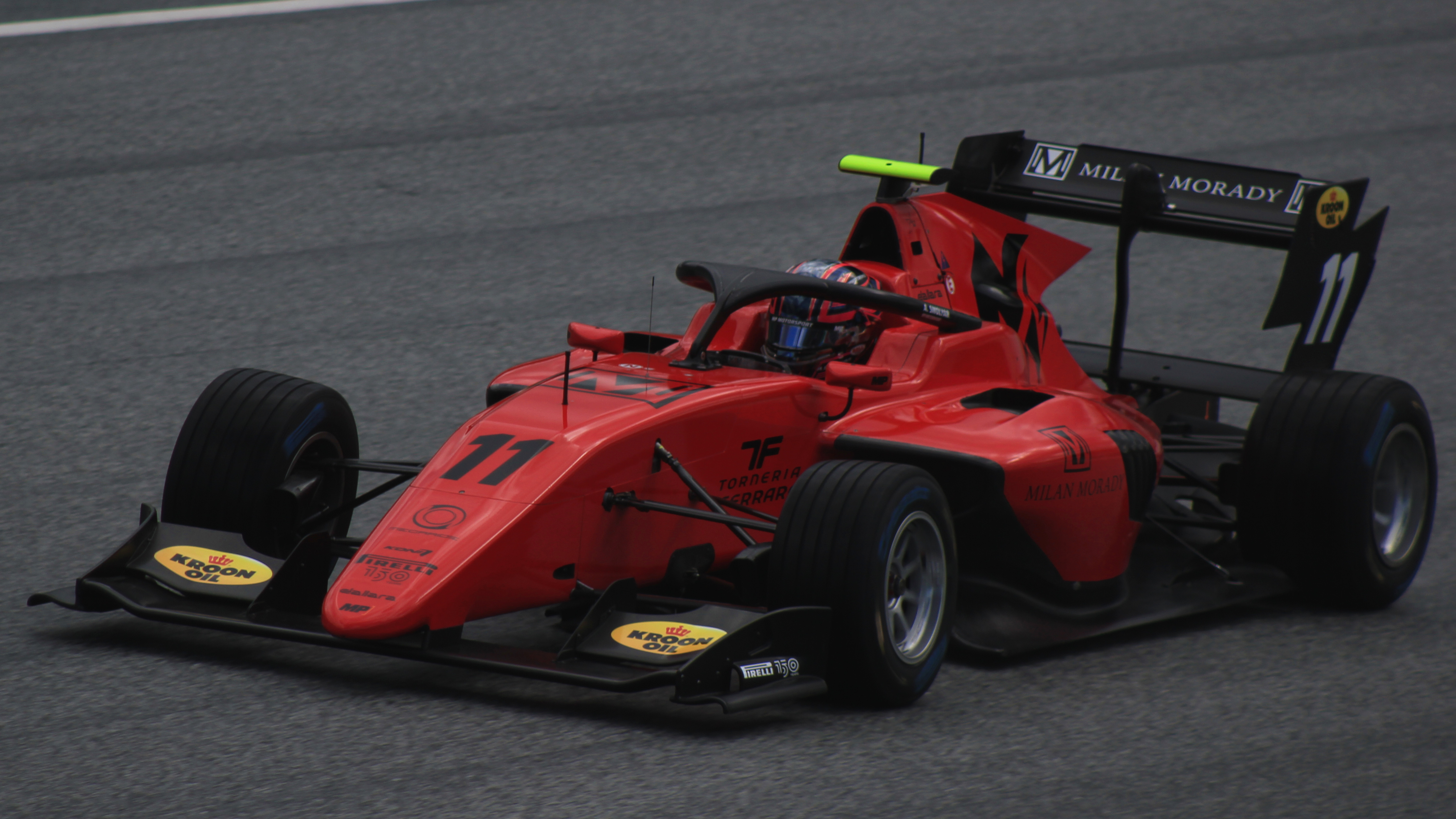
Smolyar driving for MP Motorsport during the 2022 Spielberg Formula 3 round.

On 20 January 2022, Smolyar announced that he would switch to MP Motorsport for the 2022 season. However, he was banned of using the Russian flag due to 2022 Russian invasion of Ukraine. He was initially not due to race in the championship due to the mentioned war, but eventually was allowed to race. Smolyar was forced to miss the Silverstone round of the championship since he could not get to the United Kingdom due to visa issues, and was replaced by Filip Ugran. He returned to his seat for the remaining events and picked up his sole win of the season in the feature race in Budapest. Smolyar ended up tenth in the standings, being the highest placed driver to have missed a round.

== Karting record ==
=== Karting career summary ===
Season	Series	Team	Position
2015	CIK-FIA World Championship — KFJ	Kartprom Team	43rd
2016	WSK Champions Cup — OK	Ward Racing	16th
2016	South Garda Winter Cup — OK	Ward Racing	19th
2016	WSK Super Master Series — OK	Ward Racing	10th
2016	Andrea Margutti Trophy — OK	Ward Racing	1st
2016	Trofeo delle Industrie — KZ2	Ward Racing	14th
2016	WSK Night Edition — KZ2	Ward Racing	6th
2016	WSK Night Edition — OK	Ward Racing	1st
2016	CIK-FIA European Championship — OK	Ward Racing	7th
2016	Swedish Karting Championship — KZ2	Ward Racing	16th
2016	CIK-FIA International Super Cup — KZ2	Ward Racing	29th
2016	WSK Final Cup — OK	Ward Racing	12th
2016	CIK-FIA World Championship — OK	Ward Racing	33rd

=== Complete Karting World Championship results ===
Year	Team	Car	Prefinal	Main race
2016	(Sweden) Ward Racing	OK	1st	DNF

== Racing record ==
=== Racing career summary ===
Season	Series	Team	Races	Wins	Poles	F/Laps	Podiums	Points	Position
2017	SMP F4 Championship	SMP Racing	21	0	2	0	11	217	**3rd**
2017	F4 Spanish Championship	SMP Racing	20	7	6	3	13	263	**3rd**
2018	Formula Renault Eurocup	Tech 1 Racing	20	0	0	0	0	57	12th
2018	Formula Renault NEC	Tech 1 Racing	10	0	0	0	0	18	17th
2019	Formula Renault Eurocup	R-ace GP	20	3	2	4	10	255	**3rd**
2020	FIA Formula 3 Championship	ART Grand Prix	18	0	1	0	1	59	11th
2021	FIA Formula 3 Championship	ART Grand Prix	20	2	0	2	4	107	6th
2022	FIA Formula 3 Championship	MP Motorsport	16	1	2	1	3	76	10th
2023	Russian Circuit Racing Series - Touring	Lukoil Racing Team	12	2	1	2	8	266	**3rd**
2023–24	Middle East Trophy - 992	SMP Racing	1	0	1	0	0	0	NC†
2024	Russian Circuit Racing Series - Touring	Lukoil Racing SMP Team	14	1	0	2	8	248	**3rd**
2025	Middle East Trophy - GT3	SMP Racing	2	0	0	0	0	25	5th
2025	Russian Circuit Racing Series - Touring	G-Drive SMP Racing	14	2	3	1	5	254	**2nd**
2026	Russian Circuit Racing Series - Touring	SMP Racing	14	3	5	2	7	281	**1st**

=== Complete SMP F4 Championship results ===
(key) (Races in bold indicate pole position) (Races in italics indicate fastest lap)

Year	Team	1	2	3	4	5	6	7	8	9	10	11	12	13	14	15	16	17	18	19	20	21	Pos	Points
2017	SMP Racing	SOC; 1; 3	SOC; 2; 3	**SOC**; **3**; 19	SMO; 1; 3	SMO; 2; 3	SMO; 3; 4	AHV; 1; 3	AHV; 2; 3	AHV; 3; 4	AUD; 1; 6	AUD; 2; 5	AUD; 3; 2	MSC1; 1; 2	MSC1; 2; 3	MSC1; 3; 8	MSC2; 1; 6	MSC2; 2; 17	MSC2; 3; 5	**ASS**; **1**; 2	ASS; 2; 3	ASS; 3; 6	3rd	217

=== Complete F4 Spanish Championship results ===
(key) (Races in bold indicate pole position) (Races in italics indicate fastest lap)

Year	Team	1	2	3	4	5	6	7	8	9	10	11	12	13	14	15	16	17	18	19	20	Pos	Points
2017	SMP Racing	ALC; 1; 2	ALC; 2 Ret	ALC; 3; 11	NAV1; 1; 1	NAV1; 2; 3	NAV1; 3; 10	**CAT**; **1**; 3	**CAT**; **2**; 1	**JER**; **1**; 1	**JER**; **2**; 1	**JER**; **3**; 1	NAV2; 1 DSQ	NAV2; 2 DSQ	**NAV2**; **3**; 1	NOG; 1; 3	NOG; 2; 2	NOG; 3; 1	EST; 1; 3	EST; 2; 4	EST; 3; 9	3rd	263

=== Complete Formula Renault NEC results ===
(key) (Races in bold indicate pole position) (Races in italics indicate fastest lap)

Year	Entrant	1	2	3	4	5	6	7	8	9	10	11	12	DC	Points
2018	Tech 1 Racing	PAU; 1; 13	PAU; 2; 11	MNZ; 1	MNZ; 2	SPA; 1; 11	SPA; 2; 16	HUN; 1; 10	HUN; 2; 6	NÜR; 1; 5	NÜR; 2; 8	HOC; 1; 8	HOC; 2 Ret	17th	18

=== Complete Formula Renault Eurocup results ===
(key) (Races in bold indicate pole position) (Races in italics indicate fastest lap)

Year	Team	1	2	3	4	5	6	7	8	9	10	11	12	13	14	15	16	17	18	19	20	Pos	Points
2018	Tech 1 Racing	LEC; 1; 8	LEC; 2; 23	MNZ; 1; 4	MNZ; 2 Ret	SIL; 1 Ret	SIL; 2; 7	MON; 1; 15	MON; 2; 11	RBR; 1 Ret	RBR; 2; 15	SPA; 1; 11	SPA; 2; 16	HUN; 1; 10	HUN; 2; 6	NÜR; 1; 5	NÜR; 2; 8	HOC; 1; 8	HOC; 2 Ret	CAT; 1; 6	CAT; 2; 12	12th	57
2019	R-ace GP	MNZ; 1; 20	**MNZ**; **2**; 1	SIL; 1 Ret	SIL; 2; 2	MON; 1; 2	**MON**; **2**; 1	LEC; 1; 4	LEC; 2; 2	SPA; 1; 9	SPA; 2; 6	NÜR; 1; 3	NÜR; 2; 4	HUN; 1; 2	HUN; 2; 2	CAT; 1; 2	CAT; 2; 5	HOC; 1 Ret	HOC; 2; 1	YMC; 1; 4	YMC; 2; 6	3rd	255

=== Complete FIA Formula 3 Championship results ===
(key) (Races in bold indicate pole position; races in italics indicate points for the fastest lap of top ten finishers)

Year	Entrant	1	2	3	4	5	6	7	8	9	10	11	12	13	14	15	16	17	18	19	20	21	DC	Points
2020	ART Grand Prix	RBR; FEA; 9	RBR; SPR; 7	RBR; FEA; Ret	RBR; SPR; 20	**HUN**; **FEA**; Ret	HUN; SPR; 7	SIL; FEA; 10	SIL; SPR; 6	SIL; FEA; 13	SIL; SPR; 14	CAT; FEA; 11	CAT; SPR; 12	SPA; FEA; 4	SPA; SPR; 4	MNZ; FEA; 20	MNZ; SPR; 3	MUG; FEA; 7	MUG; SPR; 10				11th	59
2021	ART Grand Prix	CAT; 1; 1	CAT; 2 Ret	CAT; 3; 11	LEC; 1; 1	LEC; 2; 7	LEC; 3; 8	RBR; 1; 14	RBR; 2; 25	RBR; 3; 4	HUN; 1; 6	HUN; 2; 4	HUN; 3; 6	SPA; 1; 10	SPA; 2; 8	SPA; 3; 3	ZAN; 1; 24	ZAN; 2; 14	ZAN; 3; 3	SOC; 1; 22	SOC; 2 C	SOC; 3; 23	6th	107
2022	MP Motorsport	BHR; SPR; 3	BHR; FEA; 23	IMO; SPR; 8	IMO; FEA; 14	CAT; SPR; 6	CAT; FEA; 4	SIL; SPR	SIL; FEA	RBR; SPR; 9	RBR; FEA; 7	HUN; SPR; 15	**HUN**; **FEA**; 1	SPA; SPR; 3	SPA; FEA; 9	ZAN; SPR; 14	ZAN; FEA; 10	MNZ; SPR; 25	**MNZ**; **FEA**; 27†				10th	76
