= 2018 Formula Renault Eurocup =

Motor racing competition

The 2018 Formula Renault Eurocup is a multi-event motor racing championship for open wheel, formula racing cars held across Europe. The championship features drivers competing in 2 litre Formula Renault single seat race cars that conform to the technical regulations for the championship. The 2018 season is the 28th Formula Renault Eurocup season organized by the Renault Sport and the third season as the main category of the World Series by Renault. The series will visit ten circuits around the Europe, including Monaco.

== Teams and drivers ==
In 2018 the series was scheduled to feature the same nine teams as in previous year. But Mark Burdett Motorsport wasn't able to appear on the grid.

Team	No.	Driver name	Status	Rounds
(France) R-ace GP	1	(United Kingdom) Max Fewtrell		All
(France) R-ace GP	2	(United States) Logan Sargeant	R	All
(France) R-ace GP	3	(France) Charles Milesi	R	All
(France) R-ace GP	4	(France) Victor Martins	R	All
(France) R-ace GP	5	(Argentina) Gabriel Gandulia	G	6–9
(Germany) Josef Kaufmann Racing	11	(United Kingdom) Clément Novalak	R	1–5, 7–10
(Germany) Josef Kaufmann Racing	12	(Netherlands) Richard Verschoor		1–6
(Germany) Josef Kaufmann Racing	16	(China) Yifei Ye		All
(France) Tech 1 Racing	21	(United States) Neil Verhagen		All
(France) Tech 1 Racing	22	(Russia) Aleksandr Smolyar	R	All
(France) Tech 1 Racing	23	(France) Thomas Neubauer		All
(France) Tech 1 Racing	24	(United Kingdom) Frank Bird		All
(Netherlands) MP Motorsport	31	(Denmark) Christian Lundgaard	R	All
(Netherlands) MP Motorsport	32	(Australia) Alex Peroni		All
(Netherlands) MP Motorsport	33	(Belgium) Max Defourny		1–4
(Netherlands) MP Motorsport	33	(Netherlands) Jarno Opmeer		5–6
(Netherlands) MP Motorsport	33	(Netherlands) Freek Schothorst		7–10
(United Kingdom) Arden	41	(Australia) Oscar Piastri	R	All
(United Kingdom) Arden	42	(Russia) Aleksandr Vartanyan		1–4
(United Kingdom) Arden	42	(Russia) Nikita Volegov		5–10
(United Kingdom) Arden	43	(Morocco) Sami Taoufik	R	All
(Spain) AVF by Adrián Vallés	51	(Mexico) Axel Matus		All
(Spain) AVF by Adrián Vallés	52	(Spain) Xavier Lloveras		1–6
(Spain) AVF by Adrián Vallés	53	(Spain) Eliseo Martínez	R	All
(Spain) AVF by Adrián Vallés	54	(Colombia) Christian Muñoz	R	All
(Italy) JD Motorsport	61	(Italy) Lorenzo Colombo	R	All
(Italy) JD Motorsport	62	(Australia) Thomas Maxwell		All
(Italy) JD Motorsport	63	(Malaysia) Najiy Razak		All
(United Kingdom) Fortec Motorsports	84	(Russia) Vladimiros Tziortzis	R	1–7, 9–10
(United Kingdom) Fortec Motorsports	85	(Mexico) Raúl Guzmán		All
(United Kingdom) Fortec Motorsports	86	(Brazil) Christian Hahn	R	2–4
(United Kingdom) Fortec Motorsports	87	(France) Arthur Rougier	R	All
(Germany) Anders Motorsport	90	(Germany) Phil Hill	G	6–9
(Germany) Anders Motorsport	91	(Germany) Doureid Ghattas	G	6–8
(Switzerland) Scorace Team	91	(Germany) Doureid Ghattas	G	9
(Switzerland) Scorace Team	92	(Switzerland) Sharon Scolari	G	6, 8–9

Icon	Status
R	Rookie
G	Guest

=== Driver changes ===
- French F4 Championship champion Arthur Rougier and SMP F4 Championship driver Vladimiros Tziortzis joined Fortec Motorsports. BRDC British Formula 3 Championship driver Jordan Cane was expected to make his Eurocup debut with Fortec but later he aborted this plan. While Raúl Guzmán made his switch to Fortec from R-ace GP. Aleksey Korneev left the team to join 2018 Blancpain GT Series Endurance Cup.
- Euroformula Open Championship driver Eliseo Martínez and French F4 Championship driver Christian Muñoz joined AVF by Adrián Vallés. Henrique Chaves moved to the 2018 European Le Mans Series. Gregoire Saucy and Thomas Randle left the team.
- Richard Verschoor, who raced with MP Motorsport switched to Josef Kaufmann Racing and was joined by karting champion and Toyota Racing Series race winner Clément Novalak.
- Aleksandr Smolyar made his racing debut with Tech 1 Racing. He was joined by former Fortec Motorsports and MP Motorsport drivers Frank Bird and Neil Verhagen respectively. Gabriel Aubry graduated to the 2018 GP3 Series, leaving his Tech 1 seat vacant.
- F4 British Championship runner-up Oscar Piastri made his Eurocup debut with Arden Motorsport. He was joined by Aleksandr Vartanyan, who made his switch from JD Motorsport, and 2017 CIK-FIA European OK karting champion Sami Taoufik.
- Christian Lundgaard graduated from Spanish F4 Championship and SMP F4 Championship as champion in both championships with MP Motorsport. Alex Peroni switched to MP Motorsport for his second Eurocup campaign after leaving Fortec Motorsports. They were joined by Max Defourny, who raced two seasons with R-ace GP.
- French F4 Championship runner-up Victor Martins joined R-ace GP. He was joined by former Tech 1 Racing driver Max Fewtrell. Charles Milesi, who raced with R-ace GP in the 2017 Formula Renault 2.0 Northern European Cup and in the four rounds of the Eurocup made his full-time switch to the series. Logan Sargeant moved from ADAC Formula 4 Championship to R-ace GP.
- Italian F4 Championship driver Lorenzo Colombo raced with JD Motorsport. Thomas Maxwell and Najiy Razak switched from Tech 1 and Fortec respectively to join JD Motorsport.

== Calendar ==
The provisional calendar for the 2018 season was announced on 25 September 2017. The series will return to Hockenheimring in its schedule. While Pau Grand Prix will be not present in the 2018 calendar. On 29 October the calendar was slightly altered, but featured the same ten circuits.

Round		Circuit	Date	Supporting
1	R1	(France) Circuit Paul Ricard, Le Castellet	14 April	European Le Mans Series
1	R2	(France) Circuit Paul Ricard, Le Castellet	15 April	European Le Mans Series
2	R1	(Italy) Autodromo Nazionale Monza	21 April	Blancpain GT Series Endurance Cup
2	R2	(Italy) Autodromo Nazionale Monza	22 April	Blancpain GT Series Endurance Cup
3	R1	(United Kingdom) Silverstone Circuit	19 May	Blancpain GT Series Endurance Cup
3	R2	(United Kingdom) Silverstone Circuit	20 May	Blancpain GT Series Endurance Cup
4	R1	Circuit de Monaco	26 May	Monaco Grand Prix
4	R2	Circuit de Monaco	27 May	Monaco Grand Prix
5	R1	(Austria) Red Bull Ring, Spielberg	21 July	European Le Mans Series
5	R2	(Austria) Red Bull Ring, Spielberg	22 July	European Le Mans Series
6	R1	(Belgium) Circuit de Spa-Francorchamps, Spa	27 July	Blancpain GT Series Endurance Cup
6	R2	(Belgium) Circuit de Spa-Francorchamps, Spa	28 July	Blancpain GT Series Endurance Cup
7	R1	(Hungary) Hungaroring	1 September	Blancpain GT Series Sprint Cup
7	R2	(Hungary) Hungaroring	2 September	Blancpain GT Series Sprint Cup
8	R1	(Germany) Nürburgring	14 September	Blancpain GT Series Sprint Cup
8	R2	(Germany) Nürburgring	15 September	Blancpain GT Series Sprint Cup
9	R1	(Germany) Hockenheimring	22 September	ADAC GT Masters
9	R2	(Germany) Hockenheimring	23 September	ADAC GT Masters
10	R1	(Spain) Circuit de Barcelona-Catalunya	20 October	International GT Open
10	R2	(Spain) Circuit de Barcelona-Catalunya	21 October	International GT Open

== Results ==
Round		Circuit	Pole position	Fastest lap	Winning driver	Winning team	Rookie winner
1	R1	(France) Paul Ricard	(United Kingdom) Max Fewtrell	(United States) Logan Sargeant	(United States) Logan Sargeant	(France) R-ace GP	(United States) Logan Sargeant
1	R2	(France) Paul Ricard	(United Kingdom) Max Fewtrell	(China) Yifei Ye	(United Kingdom) Max Fewtrell	(France) R-ace GP	(Denmark) Christian Lundgaard
2	R1	(Italy) Monza	(China) Yifei Ye	(United Kingdom) Max Fewtrell	(China) Yifei Ye	(Germany) Josef Kaufmann Racing	(Denmark) Christian Lundgaard
2	R2	(Italy) Monza	(Italy) Lorenzo Colombo	(China) Yifei Ye	(Denmark) Christian Lundgaard	(Netherlands) MP Motorsport	(Denmark) Christian Lundgaard
3	R1	(United Kingdom) Silverstone	(United Kingdom) Max Fewtrell	(United Kingdom) Max Fewtrell	(United Kingdom) Max Fewtrell	(France) R-ace GP	(United States) Logan Sargeant
3	R2	(United Kingdom) Silverstone	(France) Charles Milesi	(Russia) Aleksandr Vartanyan	(France) Charles Milesi	(France) R-ace GP	(France) Charles Milesi
4	R1	Monaco	(Australia) Alex Peroni	(France) Charles Milesi	(Australia) Alex Peroni	(Netherlands) MP Motorsport	(France) Charles Milesi
4	R2	Monaco	(France) Charles Milesi	(Australia) Alex Peroni	(France) Charles Milesi	(France) R-ace GP	(France) Charles Milesi
5	R1	(Austria) Red Bull Ring	(United Kingdom) Max Fewtrell	(United Kingdom) Max Fewtrell	(United Kingdom) Max Fewtrell	(France) R-ace GP	(Italy) Lorenzo Colombo
5	R2	(Austria) Red Bull Ring	(France) Victor Martins	(China) Yifei Ye	(France) Victor Martins	(France) R-ace GP	(France) Victor Martins
6	R1	(Belgium) Spa-Francorchamps	(Italy) Lorenzo Colombo	(France) Victor Martins	(Denmark) Christian Lundgaard	(Netherlands) MP Motorsport	(Denmark) Christian Lundgaard
6	R2	(Belgium) Spa-Francorchamps	(United States) Logan Sargeant	(France) Victor Martins	(France) Victor Martins	(France) R-ace GP	(France) Victor Martins
7	R1	(Hungary) Hungaroring	(Denmark) Christian Lundgaard	(Denmark) Christian Lundgaard	(China) Yifei Ye	(Germany) Josef Kaufmann Racing	(Denmark) Christian Lundgaard
7	R2	(Hungary) Hungaroring	(Denmark) Christian Lundgaard	(Denmark) Christian Lundgaard	(Denmark) Christian Lundgaard	(Netherlands) MP Motorsport	(Denmark) Christian Lundgaard
8	R1	(Germany) Nürburgring	(United States) Logan Sargeant	(United Kingdom) Max Fewtrell	(United States) Logan Sargeant	(France) R-ace GP	(United States) Logan Sargeant
8	R2	(Germany) Nürburgring	(United Kingdom) Max Fewtrell	(United Kingdom) Max Fewtrell	(United Kingdom) Max Fewtrell	(France) R-ace GP	(France) Victor Martins
9	R1	(Germany) Hockenheim	(United Kingdom) Max Fewtrell	(United Kingdom) Max Fewtrell	(United Kingdom) Max Fewtrell	(France) R-ace GP	(Australia) Oscar Piastri
9	R2	(Germany) Hockenheim	(Denmark) Christian Lundgaard	(United States) Logan Sargeant	(United Kingdom) Max Fewtrell	(France) R-ace GP	(Australia) Oscar Piastri
10	R1	(Spain) Catalunya	(Denmark) Christian Lundgaard	(Denmark) Christian Lundgaard	(Denmark) Christian Lundgaard	(Netherlands) MP Motorsport	(Denmark) Christian Lundgaard
10	R2	(Spain) Catalunya	(France) Victor Martins	(United States) Logan Sargeant	(United States) Logan Sargeant	(France) R-ace GP	(United States) Logan Sargeant

== Championship standings ==
=== Drivers' championship ===
Pos.	Driver	LEC (France)		MNZ (Italy)		SIL (United Kingdom)		MON (Monaco)		RBR (Note: The first race at Spielberg was red-flagged after 14 laps were completed. As not all the race distance had passed, the race paid half points to all classified finishers.) (Austria)		SPA (Belgium)		HUN (Hungary)		NÜR (Germany)		HOC (Germany)		CAT (Spain)		Points
Pos.	Driver	1	2	3	4	5	6	7	8	9	10	11	12	13	14	15	16	17	18	19	20	Points
1	(United Kingdom) Max Fewtrell	2	1	22	10	1	Ret	7	8	1	2	5	7	3	2	2	1	1	1	4	4	275.5
2	(Denmark) Christian Lundgaard	5	3	2	1	Ret	5	5	5	5	3	1	8	2	1	3	5	Ret	Ret	1	2	258
3	(China) Yifei Ye	3	2	1	15	3	3	4	4	8	5	2	3	1	11	6	6	2	3	8	8	239
4	(United States) Logan Sargeant	1	Ret	8	4	2	2	10	9	Ret	Ret	9	2	5	7	1	4	4	5	2	1	218
5	(France) Victor Martins	11	4	6	5	6	6	3	3	9	1	Ret	1	4	9	4	2	Ret	Ret	Ret	3	186
6	(Italy) Lorenzo Colombo	4	21	3	2	4	8	12	Ret	3	6	6	5	6	3	11	22	Ret	4	3	6	152.5
7	(France) Charles Milesi	9	12	7	19	7	1	2	1	10	13	10	13	9	12	7	3	10	8	5	10	122.5
8	(Australia) Oscar Piastri	6	5	12	Ret	11	4	13	12	6	9	3	9	7	4	15	7	3	2	16	11	110
9	(Australia) Alex Peroni	Ret	7	5	Ret	Ret	15	1	2	12	7	Ret	25	13	5	9	9	6	Ret	9	14	89
10	(Australia) Thomas Maxwell	10	6	10	7	8	16	8	10	7	23	7	4	11	25	8	11	5	7	Ret	5	76
11	(United States) Neil Verhagen	7	9	11	Ret	10	12	6	7	4	8	25	22	14	14	13	12	7	6	7	7	59
12	(Russia) Aleksandr Smolyar	8	23	4	Ret	Ret	7	15	11	Ret	15	11	16	10	6	5	8	8	Ret	6	12	57
13	(Netherlands) Richard Verschoor	Ret	8	24	9	9	11	14	13	2	4	8	10									34
14	(Belgium) Max Defourny	Ret	10	9	3	16	14	9	6													28
15	(France) Arthur Rougier	Ret	15	18	20	15	Ret	27	14	11	14	4	6	Ret	8	10	13	12	10	WD	WD	26
16	(Russia) Aleksandr Vartanyan	19	11	Ret	12	5	10	11	15													11
17	(France) Thomas Neubauer	12	17	14	6	18	24	26	23	DNS	DNS	WD	WD	Ret	Ret	21	10	Ret	Ret	14	23	9
18	(United Kingdom) Frank Bird	17	18	13	8	Ret	21	22	20	13	10	14	11	12	13	Ret	21	20	13	10	17	6
19	(Mexico) Axel Matus	20	16	Ret	Ret	14	Ret	18	Ret	16	11	Ret	26	8	15	16	Ret	Ret	14	Ret	Ret	4
20	(Spain) Eliseo Martínez	16	20	15	11	17	17	23	18	21	17	15	12	15	21	12	Ret	14	9	11	9	4
21	(Mexico) Raúl Guzmán	13	22	19	21	Ret	9	20	16	15	12	13	23	Ret	Ret	25	18	9	11	15	16	4
22	(Morocco) Sami Taoufik	23	13	17	13	13	13	Ret	Ret	Ret	16	17	Ret	16	10	17	14	19	12	Ret	15	1
23	(United Kingdom) Clément Novalak	15	Ret	16	Ret	12	Ret	25	22	Ret	DNS			18	22	14	16	11	22	Ret	13	0
24	(Colombia) Christian Muñoz	22	14	23	14	20	23	21	25	19	21	21	17	Ret	Ret	19	19	17	16	12	22	0
25	(Netherlands) Jarno Opmeer									18	Ret	12	24									0
26	(Russia) Nikita Volegov									17	18	16	Ret	19	17	18	15	13	24	Ret	19	0
27	(Russia) Vladimiros Tziortzis	21	19	25	Ret	21	18	24	21	22	22	20	19	Ret	16			18	18	13	21	0
28	(Malaysia) Najiy Razak	14	Ret	Ret	17	22	20	19	19	14	19	18	15	23	18	Ret	Ret	Ret	23	Ret	20	0
29	(Spain) Xavier Lloveras	18	Ret	20	16	19	22	16	17	20	20	22	14									0
30	(Netherlands) Freek Schothorst													17	24	20	17	15	19	Ret	18	0
31	(Brazil) Christian Hahn			21	18	23	19	17	24													0
guest drivers ineligible to score points
—	(Germany) Phil Hill											19	18	21	23	23	DNS	21	15			—
—	(Germany) Doureid Ghattas											23	20	20	19	22	20	16	20			—
—	(Argentina) Gabriel Gandulia											24	21	22	20	24	24	22	17			—
—	(Switzerland) Sharon Scolari											26	DNS			26	23	23	21			—
Pos.	Driver	LEC (France)		MNZ (Italy)		SIL (United Kingdom)		MON (Monaco)		RBR (Austria)		SPA (Belgium)		HUN (Hungary)		NÜR (Germany)		HOC (Germany)		CAT (Spain)		Points

=== Teams' championship ===
Only two-best cars are eligible to score points in the teams' championship.

Pos.	Team	LEC (France)		MNZ (Italy)		SIL (United Kingdom)		MON (Monaco)		RBR (Austria)		SPA (Belgium)		HUN (Hungary)		NÜR (Germany)		HOC (Germany)		CAT (Spain)		Points
Pos.	Team	1	2	3	4	5	6	7	8	9	10	11	12	13	14	15	16	17	18	19	20	Points
1	(France) R-ace GP	1	1	6	4	1	1	2	1	1	1	5	1	3	2	1	1	1	1	2	1	662.5
1	(France) R-ace GP	2	4	8	5	2	2	3	3	9	2	9	2	4	7	2	2	4	5	4	3	662.5
2	(Netherlands) MP Motorsport	5	3	2	1	16	5	1	2	5	3	1	8	2	1	3	5	6	19	1	2	362
2	(Netherlands) MP Motorsport	Ret	7	5	3	Ret	14	5	5	12	7	12	24	13	5	9	9	15	Ret	9	14	362
3	(Germany) Josef Kaufmann Racing	3	2	1	9	3	3	4	4	2	4	2	3	1	11	6	6	2	3	8	8	273
3	(Germany) Josef Kaufmann Racing	15	8	16	15	9	11	14	13	8	5	8	10	18	22	14	16	11	22	Ret	13	273
4	(Italy) JD Motorsport	4	6	3	2	4	8	8	10	3	6	6	4	6	3	8	11	5	4	3	5	228.5
4	(Italy) JD Motorsport	10	21	10	7	8	16	12	9	7	19	7	5	11	18	11	22	Ret	7	Ret	6	228.5
5	(France) Tech 1 Racing	7	9	4	6	10	7	6	7	4	8	11	11	10	6	5	8	7	6	6	7	130
5	(France) Tech 1 Racing	8	17	11	8	18	12	15	11	13	15	14	16	12	13	13	10	8	13	7	12	130
6	(United Kingdom) Arden	6	5	12	12	5	4	11	12	6	9	3	9	7	4	15	7	3	2	16	11	122
6	(United Kingdom) Arden	19	11	17	13	11	10	13	15	17	16	16	Ret	16	10	17	14	13	12	Ret	15	122
7	(United Kingdom) Fortec Motorsports	13	15	18	18	15	9	17	14	11	12	4	6	Ret	8	10	13	9	10	13	16	30
7	(United Kingdom) Fortec Motorsports	21	19	19	20	21	18	20	16	15	14	13	19	Ret	17	18	18	12	11	15	21	30
8	(Spain) AVF by Adrián Vallés	16	14	15	11	14	17	16	17	16	11	15	12	8	15	12	19	14	9	11	9	8
8	(Spain) AVF by Adrián Vallés	18	16	20	14	17	22	18	18	19	17	21	14	15	21	16	Ret	17	14	12	22	8
guest teams ineligible to score points
—	(Germany) Anders Motorsport											19	18	20	19	22	20	16	15			—
—	(Germany) Anders Motorsport											23	20	21	23	23	DNS	21	20			—
—	(Switzerland) Scorace Team											26	DNS			26	23	23	21			—
Pos.	Team	LEC (France)		MNZ (Italy)		SIL (United Kingdom)		MON (Monaco)		RBR (Austria)		SPA (Belgium)		HUN (Hungary)		NÜR (Germany)		HOC (Germany)		CAT (Spain)		Points
