= 2014 Formula Renault 2.0 Alps Series =

Formula racing series

Seasons
- ← 2013 2015 →

The 2014 Formula Renault 2.0 Alps Series was the fourth year of the Formula Renault 2.0 Alps series. The championship began on 5 April at Imola and finished on 5 October at Jerez after fourteen races held at seven meetings.

Koiranen GP driver Nyck de Vries, in his second season of competing in Formula Renault 2.0 Alps and his third season in Formula Renault overall, dominated the championship from the opening round, clinching the overall championship title with a round to spare. De Vries took nine overall wins during the season, with an additional class victory at Jerez, behind wildcard driver Bruno Bonifacio, who took the overall win. The remaining wins were shared between junior championship frontrunners Charles Leclerc and Matevos Isaakyan, who took doubles at Monza and the Red Bull Ring respectively. Leclerc prevailed in both championship battles; he beat Isaakyan by 19 points in the overall championship for second place, while Leclerc padded the advantage to 33 points for the junior championship honours. Koiranen GP comfortably won the teams' championship, finishing almost 150 points clear of the next best team, Fortec Motorsports.

== Drivers and teams ==
Team	No.	Driver name	Rounds
(Italy) Prema Powerteam	1	(Poland) Alex Bosak	All
(Italy) Prema Powerteam	2	(Singapore) Andrew Tang	1
(Italy) Prema Powerteam	60	(Brazil) Bruno Bonifacio	1, 6–7
(Italy) Prema Powerteam	61	(Estonia) Hans Villemi	1, 6
(Italy) Prema Powerteam	62	(Norway) Dennis Olsen	1, 6–7
(France) Tech 1 Racing	3	(Canada) Luke Chudleigh	All
(France) Tech 1 Racing	4	(Switzerland) Hugo de Sadeleer	All
(France) Tech 1 Racing	21	(Indonesia) Philo Paz Armand	All
(France) Tech 1 Racing	29	(Malaysia) Akash Nandy	All
(France) Tech 1 Racing	51	(France) Anthoine Hubert	1, 6–7
(France) Tech 1 Racing	52	(Russia) Vasily Romanov	1, 6
(France) Tech 1 Racing	53	(Russia) Egor Orudzhev	1, 6–7
(France) Arta Engineering	5	(France) Simon Gachet	All
(France) Arta Engineering	6	(Australia) James Allen	All
(Finland) Koiranen GP	7	(Russia) Mikhail Tarasov	1–2
(Finland) Koiranen GP	8	(China) Ling Kang	1–2, 4
(Finland) Koiranen GP	9	(Russia) Vitaly Larionov	1–2
(Finland) Koiranen GP	10	(United Kingdom) George Russell	All
(Finland) Koiranen GP	19	(Netherlands) Nyck de Vries	All
(Finland) Koiranen GP	22	(Brazil) Pietro Fittipaldi	7
(Finland) Koiranen GP	70	(China) Ye Hongli	1, 4–7
(Finland) Koiranen GP	78	(Italy) Ignazio D'Agosto	3
(Finland) Koiranen GP	78	(China) Yuan Bo	4–5
(Switzerland) Jenzer Motorsport	11	(Russia) Denis Korneev	1–3
(Switzerland) Jenzer Motorsport	12	(Germany) Marek Böckmann	All
(Switzerland) Jenzer Motorsport	13	(China) Yuan Bo	1
(Switzerland) Jenzer Motorsport	14	(Russia) Dennis Anoschin	1–3
(United Kingdom) Fortec Motorsports	15	(Croatia) Martin Kodrić	All
(United Kingdom) Fortec Motorsports	16	(Brazil) Thiago Vivacqua	All
(United Kingdom) Fortec Motorsports	17	(Monaco) Charles Leclerc	All
(United Kingdom) Fortec Motorsports	18	(United Kingdom) Ben Barnicoat	2, 4–5
(United Kingdom) Fortec Motorsports	18	(United Kingdom) Sebastian Morris	1
(United Kingdom) Fortec Motorsports	38	(United Kingdom) Sebastian Morris	4
(United Kingdom) Fortec Motorsports	57	(United Kingdom) Matt Parry	1, 6–7
(United Kingdom) Fortec Motorsports	58	(United Kingdom) Jack Aitken	1, 5–7
(United Kingdom) Fortec Motorsports	59	(Estonia) Martin Rump	1, 7
(United Kingdom) Fortec Motorsports	72	(Mexico) Jorge Cevallos	4, 6
(United Kingdom) MGR Motorsport	22	(Brazil) Pietro Fittipaldi	4–6
(Italy) JD Motorsport	25	(Russia) Matevos Isaakyan	All
(Italy) JD Motorsport	26	(Russia) Denis Korneev	4–7
(Italy) BVM Racing	27	(Italy) Dario Capitanio	All
(Italy) BVM Racing	28	(Russia) Semen Evstigneev	All
(Italy) BVM Racing	42	(Ukraine) Danylo Pronenko	5–7
(Italy) Cram Motorsport	31	(Russia) Vasily Romanov	7
(Italy) Cram Motorsport	32	(Italy) Alessio Rovera	1–6
(Italy) Cram Motorsport	33	(Austria) Stefan Riener	4–7
(Austria) China BRT by JCS	35	(New Zealand) Nick Cassidy	1
(Austria) China BRT by JCS	36	(Switzerland) Mathéo Tuscher	1
(Austria) China BRT by JCS	37	(China) Sun Zheng	1, 4–5
(Italy) Brixia Horse Power	39	(Italy) Andrea Baiguera	6
(Slovenia) AS Motorsport by GSK	42	(Ukraine) Danylo Pronenko	1–4
(Italy) GSK Grand Prix	45	(Italy) Daniele Cazzaniga	3–7
(Italy) GSK Grand Prix	96	(Italy) Matteo Cairoli	1
(United Kingdom) Strakka Racing	50	(United Kingdom) Jake Hughes	7
(Italy) TS Corse	63	(Italy) Matteo Gonfiantini	1–6
(Italy) TS Corse	73	(Italy) Pietro Peccenini	All
(United Kingdom) Mark Burdett Motorsport	66	(United Kingdom) Raoul Owens	4

== Race calendar and results ==
The seven-event calendar for the 2014 season was announced on 28 November 2013. As in 2012, only three rounds were held in Italy (Monza, Imola and Mugello), versus six in 2013. The four rounds outside Italy consisted of races at the Pau Grand Prix, the Red Bull Ring, Spa-Francorchamps and – for the first time – Jerez.

Round		Circuit	Date	Pole position	Fastest lap	Winning driver	Winning team	Junior Winner
1	R1	(Italy) Autodromo Enzo e Dino Ferrari, Imola	5 April	(Netherlands) Nyck de Vries	(Netherlands) Nyck de Vries	(Netherlands) Nyck de Vries	(Finland) Koiranen GP	(United Kingdom) George Russell
1	R2	(Italy) Autodromo Enzo e Dino Ferrari, Imola	6 April	(Netherlands) Nyck de Vries	(Netherlands) Nyck de Vries	(Netherlands) Nyck de Vries	(Finland) Koiranen GP	(United Kingdom) George Russell
2	R1	(France) Pau Circuit, Pau	10 May	(Netherlands) Nyck de Vries	(Netherlands) Nyck de Vries	(Netherlands) Nyck de Vries	(Finland) Koiranen GP	(Russia) Matevos Isaakyan
2	R2	(France) Pau Circuit, Pau	11 May	(Netherlands) Nyck de Vries	(Netherlands) Nyck de Vries	(Netherlands) Nyck de Vries	(Finland) Koiranen GP	(Monaco) Charles Leclerc
3	R1	(Austria) Red Bull Ring, Spielberg	24 May	(Russia) Matevos Isaakyan (Note: Charles Leclerc, Simon Gachet and George Russell recorded the fastest times in qualifying for the races at the Red Bull Ring, but they were penalised after a stewards' decision. Matevos Isaakyan was recognised as the pole-sitter for the races.)	(Netherlands) Nyck de Vries	(Russia) Matevos Isaakyan	(Italy) JD Motorsport	(Russia) Matevos Isaakyan
3	R2	(Austria) Red Bull Ring, Spielberg	25 May	(Russia) Matevos Isaakyan	(Russia) Semen Evstigneev	(Russia) Matevos Isaakyan	(Italy) JD Motorsport	(Russia) Matevos Isaakyan
4	R1	(Belgium) Circuit de Spa-Francorchamps	7 June	(Netherlands) Nyck de Vries	(Netherlands) Nyck de Vries	(Netherlands) Nyck de Vries	(Finland) Koiranen GP	(Russia) Matevos Isaakyan
4	R2	(Belgium) Circuit de Spa-Francorchamps	8 June	(Netherlands) Nyck de Vries	(Netherlands) Nyck de Vries	(Netherlands) Nyck de Vries	(Finland) Koiranen GP	(Russia) Matevos Isaakyan
5	R1	(Italy) Autodromo Nazionale Monza	5 July	(Austria) Stefan Riener	(Austria) Stefan Riener	(Monaco) Charles Leclerc	(United Kingdom) Fortec Motorsports	(Monaco) Charles Leclerc
5	R2	(Italy) Autodromo Nazionale Monza	6 July	(Monaco) Charles Leclerc	(United Kingdom) Jack Aitken	(Monaco) Charles Leclerc	(United Kingdom) Fortec Motorsports	(Monaco) Charles Leclerc
6	R1	(Italy) Mugello Circuit	6 September	(Netherlands) Nyck de Vries	(Netherlands) Nyck de Vries	(Netherlands) Nyck de Vries	(Finland) Koiranen GP	(Monaco) Charles Leclerc
6	R2	(Italy) Mugello Circuit	7 September	(Netherlands) Nyck de Vries	(Netherlands) Nyck de Vries	(Netherlands) Nyck de Vries	(Finland) Koiranen GP	(Monaco) Charles Leclerc
7	R1	(Spain) Circuito de Jerez	5 October	(Brazil) Bruno Bonifacio	(Brazil) Bruno Bonifacio	(Brazil) Bruno Bonifacio	(Italy) Prema Powerteam	(Monaco) Charles Leclerc
7	R2	(Spain) Circuito de Jerez	5 October	(Netherlands) Nyck de Vries	(Netherlands) Nyck de Vries	(Netherlands) Nyck de Vries	(Finland) Koiranen GP	(Russia) Matevos Isaakyan

== Championship standings ==
=== Drivers' Championship ===
Pos	Driver	IMO (Italy)		PAU (France)		RBR (Austria)		SPA (Belgium)		MNZ (Italy)		MUG (Italy)		JER (Spain)		Points
1	(Netherlands) Nyck de Vries	1	1	1	1	3	3	1	1	4	6	1	1	2	1	300
2	(Monaco) Charles Leclerc	Ret	Ret	6	2	4	4	3	3	1	1	2	2	6	7	199
3	(Russia) Matevos Isaakyan	(Note: Isaakyan was entered for the opening round at Imola, but he was ineligible to compete in the races as he was not yet aged sixteen. However, he was able to take part in free practice sessions.)		2	Ret	1	1	2	2	Ret	2	7	3	8	6	180
4	(United Kingdom) George Russell	6	9	4	Ret	2	5	8	7	WD	WD	5	7	13	8	123
5	(France) Simon Gachet	3	3	3	8	11	7	23	Ret	Ret	7	32	18	16	11	78
6	(Italy) Alessio Rovera	Ret	20	17	Ret	6	2	14	8	2	3	20	23			65
7	(Italy) Dario Capitanio	Ret	14	10	6	8	8	DSQ	6	11	4	15	10	18	19	55
8	(Russia) Denis Korneev	11	11	15	9	Ret	11	9	12	Ret	Ret	14	33	12	9	46
9	(Brazil) Pietro Fittipaldi							Ret	13	12	5	4	8	19	10	43
10	(Austria) Stefan Riener							20	Ret	3	Ret	9	14	14	12	37
11	(Poland) Alex Bosak	14	13	9	Ret	9	6	27	9	10	11	21	20	15	14	37
12	(Canada) Luke Chudleigh	Ret	Ret	8	Ret	5	9	4	Ret	6	DNS	19	21	24	17	36
13	(Malaysia) Akash Nandy	17	15	7	Ret	21	12	5	10	8	Ret	13	12	Ret	13	35
14	(United Kingdom) Ben Barnicoat			5	Ret			Ret	4	5	21					32
15	(United Kingdom) Sebastian Morris	12	6					6	Ret							31
16	(Switzerland) Hugo de Sadeleer	18	Ret	11	3	19	17	19	26	Ret	Ret	12	11	21	21	27
17	(Singapore) Andrew Tang	8	7													24
18	(Indonesia) Philo Paz Armand	21	22	Ret	4	14	Ret	7	11	Ret	8	24	28	25	23	23
19	(Croatia) Martin Kodrić	27	16	12	5	Ret	10	24	17	7	20	18	Ret	20	25	18
20	(Germany) Marek Böckmann	13	26	Ret	Ret	12	16	10	24	19	13	23	15	17	22	10
21	(Russia) Semen Evstigneev	Ret	Ret	16	7	13	21	DSQ	DNS	13	19	17	16	30	16	6
22	(Italy) Matteo Gonfiantini	22	Ret	19	10	16	18	12	15	9	10	26	30			5
23	(Australia) James Allen	20	24	13	Ret	10	19	Ret	22	Ret	16	30	29	Ret	15	2
24	(Russia) Dennis Anoschin	15	18	22	Ret	18	13									2
25	(Italy) Pietro Peccenini	Ret	28	21	11	20	20	18	23	18	18	31	31	29	24	0
26	(Brazil) Thiago Vivacqua	23	17	18	Ret	17	14	DSQ	14	15	14	33	22	27	20	0
27	(Italy) Daniele Cazzaniga					15	Ret	17	21	14	Ret	25	26	23	Ret	0
28	(China) Ling Kang	25	21	14	Ret			15	18							0
29	(Ukraine) Danylo Pronenko	Ret	Ret	20	Ret	DNS	15	22	27	16	15	27	32	28	Ret	0
30	(China) Sun Zheng	DNS	DNS					16	20	Ret	17					0
31	(China) Yuan Bo	Ret	23					21	25	Ret	Ret					0
32	(Russia) Mikhail Tarasov	26	29	WD	WD											0
33	(New Zealand) Nick Cassidy	Ret	30													0
	(Russia) Vitaly Larionov	Ret	Ret	WD	WD											0
	(Italy) Matteo Cairoli	Ret	DNS													0
	(Switzerland) Mathéo Tuscher	WD	WD													0
Guest drivers ineligible for points
	(Brazil) Bruno Bonifacio	2	2									3	4	1	Ret	
	(Russia) Egor Orudzhev	16	Ret									10	6	3	2	
	(United Kingdom) Matt Parry	9	25									11	13	4	3	
	(United Kingdom) Jack Aitken	4	4							Ret	12	34	19	7	Ret	
	(Norway) Dennis Olsen	5	8									8	5	5	4	
	(Estonia) Hans Villemi	7	5									16	24			
	(United Kingdom) Jake Hughes													9	5	
	(United Kingdom) Raoul Owens							Ret	5							
	(France) Anthoine Hubert	10	10									6	9	11	Ret	
	(Italy) Ignazio D'Agosto					7	22									
	(China) Ye Hongli	19	19					13	16	17	9	28	17	22	18	
	(Russia) Vasily Romanov	24	27									22	25	10	Ret	
	(Mexico) Jorge Cevallos							11	19			WD	WD			
	(Estonia) Martin Rump	Ret	12											26	Ret	
	(Italy) Andrea Baiguera											29	27			
Pos	Driver	IMO (Italy)		PAU (France)		RBR (Austria)		SPA (Belgium)		MNZ (Italy)		MUG (Italy)		JER (Spain)		Points

Colour	Result
Gold	Winner
Silver	Second place
Bronze	Third place
Green	Points classification
Blue	Non-points classification
Blue	Non-classified finish (NC)
Purple	Retired, not classified (Ret)
Red	Did not qualify (DNQ)
Red	Did not pre-qualify (DNPQ)
Black	Disqualified (DSQ)
White	Did not start (DNS)
White	Withdrew (WD)
White	Race cancelled (C)
Blank	Did not practice (DNP)
Blank	Did not arrive (DNA)
Blank	Excluded (EX)

Notes:

- † — Drivers did not finish the race, but were classified as they completed over 90% of the race distance.

=== Juniors' championship ===
Pos	Driver	IMO (Italy)		PAU (France)		RBR (Austria)		SPA (Belgium)		MNZ (Italy)		MUG (Italy)		JER (Spain)		Points
1	(Monaco) Charles Leclerc	Ret	Ret	6	2	4	4	3	3	1	1	2	2	6	7	249
2	(Russia) Matevos Isaakyan			2	Ret	1	1	2	2	Ret	2	7	3	8	6	216
3	(United Kingdom) George Russell	6	9	4	Ret	2	5	8	7	WD	WD	5	7	13	8	183
4	(Malaysia) Akash Nandy	17	15	7	Ret	21	12	5	10	8	Ret	13	12	Ret	13	113
5	(Brazil) Pietro Fittipaldi							Ret	13	12	5	4	8	19	10	81
6	(Croatia) Martin Kodrić	27	16	12	5	Ret	10	24	17	7	20	18	Ret	20	25	75
7	(Germany) Marek Böckmann	13	26	Ret	Ret	12	16	10	24	19	13	23	15	17	22	73
8	(Indonesia) Philo Paz Armand	21	22	Ret	4	14	Ret	7	11	Ret	8	24	28	25	23	71
9	(Switzerland) Hugo de Sadeleer	18	Ret	11	3	19	17	19	26	Ret	Ret	12	11	21	21	68
10	(United Kingdom) Ben Barnicoat			5	Ret			Ret	4	5	21					48
11	(Italy) Matteo Gonfiantini	22	Ret	19	10	16	18	12	15	9	10	26	30			45
12	(Brazil) Thiago Vivacqua	23	17	18	Ret	17	14	DSQ	14	15	14	33	22	27	20	44
13	(Russia) Semen Evstigneev	Ret	Ret	16	7	13	21	DSQ	DNS	13	19	17	16	30	16	44
14	(Australia) James Allen	20	24	13	Ret	10	19	Ret	22	Ret	16	30	29	Ret	15	40
15	(Russia) Dennis Anoschin	15	18	22	Ret	18	13									34
16	(China) Ling Kang	25	21	14	Ret			15	18							15
17	(Russia) Mikhail Tarasov	26	29	WD	WD											1
	(Russia) Vitaly Larionov	Ret	Ret	WD	WD											0
Pos	Driver	IMO (Italy)		PAU (France)		RBR (Austria)		SPA (Belgium)		MNZ (Italy)		MUG (Italy)		JER (Spain)		Points

Colour	Result
Gold	Winner
Silver	Second place
Bronze	Third place
Green	Points classification
Blue	Non-points classification
Blue	Non-classified finish (NC)
Purple	Retired, not classified (Ret)
Red	Did not qualify (DNQ)
Red	Did not pre-qualify (DNPQ)
Black	Disqualified (DSQ)
White	Did not start (DNS)
White	Withdrew (WD)
White	Race cancelled (C)
Blank	Did not practice (DNP)
Blank	Did not arrive (DNA)
Blank	Excluded (EX)

=== Teams' championship ===
Prior to each round of the championship, two drivers from each team – if applicable – are nominated to score teams' championship points.

Pos	Team	Points
1	(Finland) Koiranen GP	423
2	(United Kingdom) Fortec Motorsports	274
3	(Italy) JD Motorsport	206
4	(France) Tech 1 Racing	115
5	(Italy) Cram Motorsport	102
6	(France) Arta Engineering	80
7	(Italy) BVM Racing	61
8	(Italy) Prema Powerteam	61
9	(United Kingdom) MGR Motorsport	35
10	(Switzerland) Jenzer Motorsport	30
11	(Italy) TS Corse	5
	(Italy) GSK Grand Prix	0
	(Slovenia) AS Motorsport by GSK	0
	(Austria) China BRT by JCS	0
Guest teams ineligible for points
	(United Kingdom) Strakka Racing	0
	(United Kingdom) Mark Burdett Motorsport	0
	(Italy) Brixia Horse Power	0
