= 2016 GP3 Series =

Season of motor racing competitions

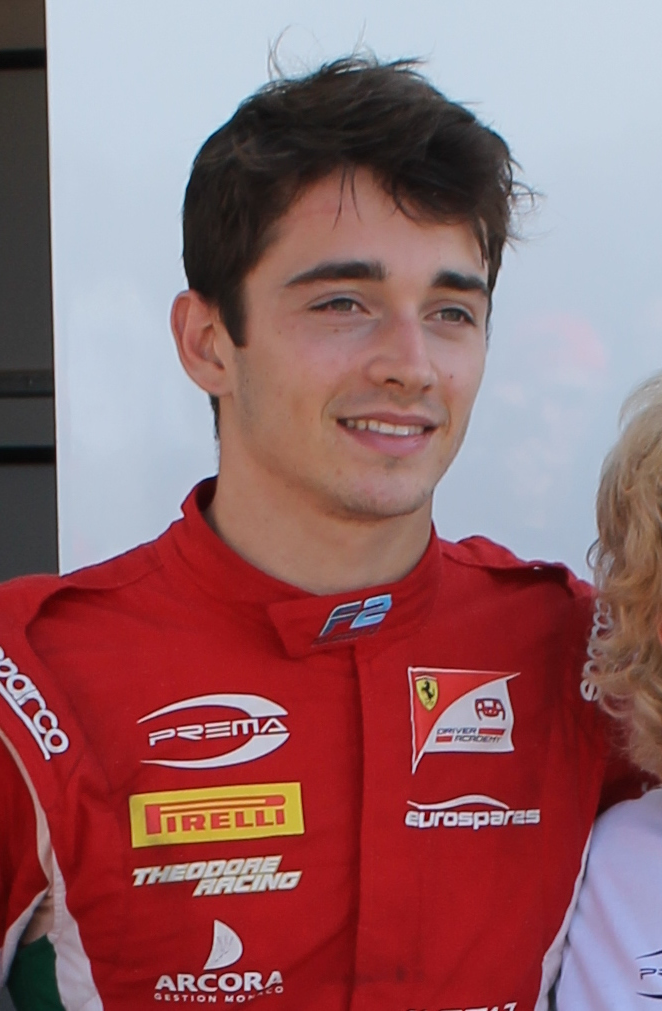
Charles Leclerc (pictured in 2017), the series champion.

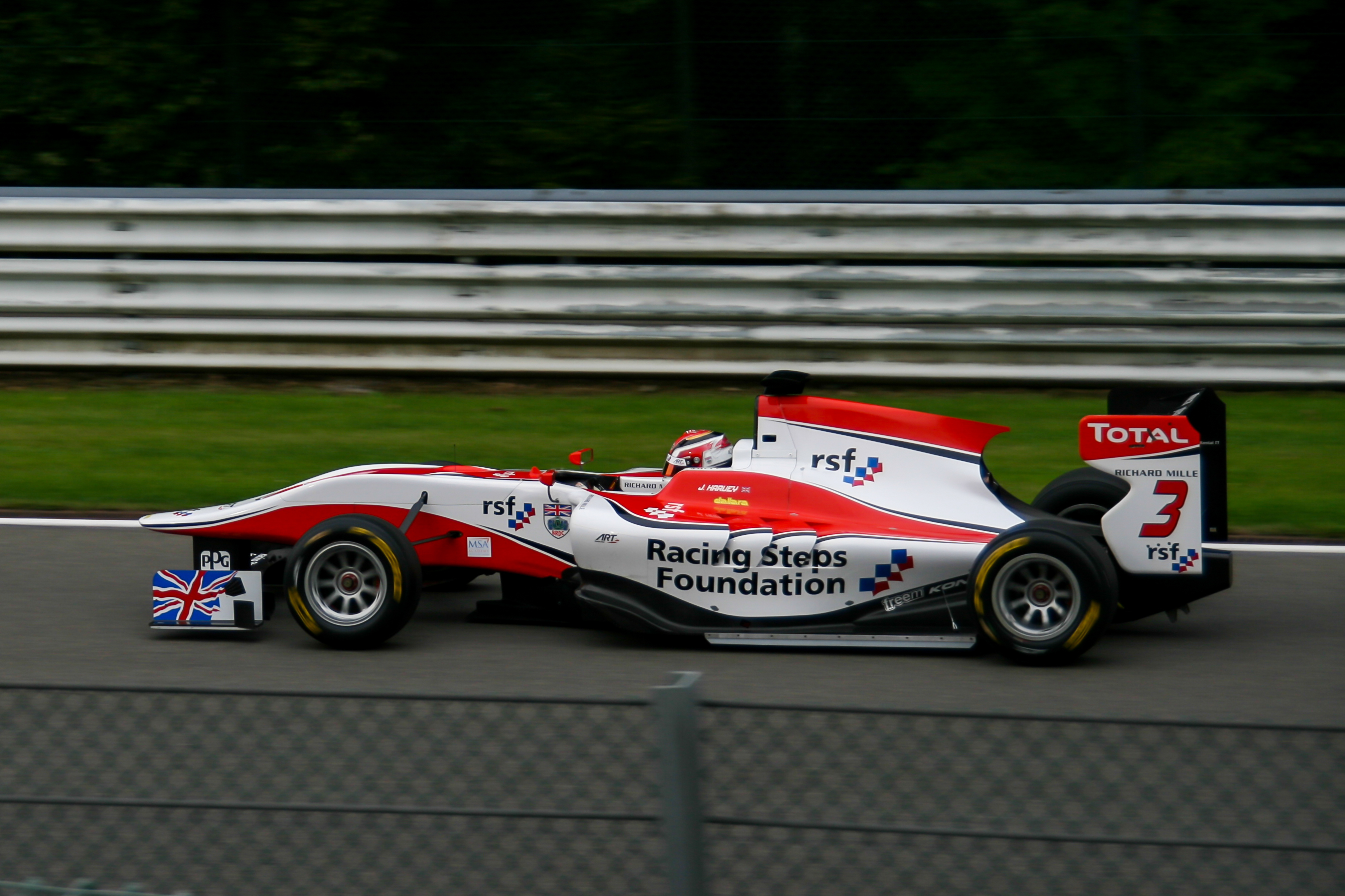
ART Grand Prix started the season as the defending teams' champions and won the teams championship in 2016.

The 2016 GP3 Series was the seventh season of the third-tier of Formula One feeder championship and also seventh season under the moniker of GP3 Series, a motor racing feeder series that runs in support of the 2016 FIA Formula One World Championship and sister series GP2. In keeping with the series' philosophy of updating its technical regulations every three years, the Dallara GP3/13 chassis introduced in the 2013 season was discontinued and Dallara supplied all teams with a new model known as the GP3/16, which will be used until 2018.

Mecachrome took over as official engine supplier of the series from 2016 onwards, replacing AER after three years but the 3.4-litre V6 naturally-aspirated would remain.

ART Grand Prix started the season as the defending teams' champions, and successfully defended their title, securing the championship after the first race at Monza. Monegasque driver Charles Leclerc, who drove for ART Grand Prix, won the drivers' title after the first race in the final round in Abu Dhabi.

The most races were won by runner-up Alexander Albon, who scored 4 race wins, he lost the title by 25 points to his ART Grand Prix teammate Charles Leclerc who took 3 feature race wins; Antonio Fuoco took 2 race wins, Jake Dennis and Nyck de Vries also took 2 podiums each on the top step. Jake Hughes took 2 sprint race wins; he won in Hockenheim and Yas Marina. Jack Aitken, Matthew Parry, and Ralph Boschung each took 1 race win during the season.

== Teams and drivers ==
Teams are allowed to run four cars to compensate for the drop in the number of entries. The starting grid for any individual race meeting may contain a possible maximum of 28 cars across seven teams.

Team	No.	Driver name	Rounds
(France) ART Grand Prix	1	(Monaco) Charles Leclerc	All
(France) ART Grand Prix	2	(Japan) Nirei Fukuzumi	All
(France) ART Grand Prix	3	(Thailand) Alexander Albon	All
(France) ART Grand Prix	4	(Netherlands) Nyck de Vries	All
(Italy) Trident	5	(Italy) Antonio Fuoco	All
(Italy) Trident	6	(Poland) Artur Janosz	All
(Italy) Trident	7	(France) Giuliano Alesi	All
(Italy) Trident	8	(Thailand) Sandy Stuvik	All
(United Kingdom) Arden International	9	(United Kingdom) Jake Dennis	All
(United Kingdom) Arden International	10	(Colombia) Tatiana Calderón	All
(United Kingdom) Arden International	11	(United Kingdom) Jack Aitken	All
(Finland) Koiranen GP	14	(United Kingdom) Matt Parry	All
(Finland) Koiranen GP	15	(India) Mahaveer Raghunathan	1
(Finland) Koiranen GP	16	(Russia) Matevos Isaakyan	All
(Finland) Koiranen GP	17	(Switzerland) Ralph Boschung	1–5, 7
(Finland) Koiranen GP	17	(Finland) Niko Kari	6
(Switzerland) Jenzer Motorsport	18	(Malaysia) Akash Nandy	All
(Switzerland) Jenzer Motorsport	19	(Slovakia) Richard Gonda	1–2, 4
(Switzerland) Jenzer Motorsport	19	(Colombia) Óscar Tunjo	6
(Switzerland) Jenzer Motorsport	19	(Italy) Alessio Lorandi	8–9
(Switzerland) Jenzer Motorsport	20	(Colombia) Óscar Tunjo	1–2
(Switzerland) Jenzer Motorsport	20	(India) Arjun Maini	3–9
(Spain) Campos Racing	22	(Spain) Álex Palou	All
(Spain) Campos Racing	23	(Netherlands) Steijn Schothorst	All
(Spain) Campos Racing	24	(Russia) Konstantin Tereshchenko	All
(France) DAMS	26	(United States) Santino Ferrucci	All
(France) DAMS	27	(United Kingdom) Jake Hughes	All
(France) DAMS	28	(Switzerland) Kevin Jörg	All

=== Driver changes ===
Entering GP3

- Alexander Albon, who finished seventh in the 2015 European Formula 3 season, entered the series, with ART Grand Prix.
- Giuliano Alesi, son of former Formula One driver Jean Alesi, graduated to the series from French F4 with Trident, with backing from Scuderia Ferrari.
- 2015 Formula Renault 2.0 Alps runner-up Jake Hughes, 2015 Formula Renault 2.0 NEC runner-up Kevin Jörg and European Formula 3 driver Santino Ferrucci joined the series with newcomers DAMS.
- Jake Dennis, who finished third in the 2015 European Formula 3 season, entered the series with Arden International.
- Matevos Isaakyan, who contested the last two rounds of the 2015 season for Koiranen GP, moved to the series full-time with the team.
- 2015 Euroformula Open runner-up Konstantin Tereshchenko and 2015 Renault Sport Trophy runner-up Steijn Schothorst joined the series with Campos Racing.
- 2015 Eurocup Formula Renault 2.0 and Alps champion Jack Aitken graduated to the series with Arden.
- 2015 European Formula 3 entrant and 2015–16 MRF Challenge runner-up Tatiana Calderón entered the series with Arden International.
- Nirei Fukuzumi, who finished fourth in Japanese F3 in 2015, stepped up to the series with ART Grand Prix.
- European Formula 3 driver Mahaveer Raghunathan joined the series with Koiranen.
- 2015 European Formula 3 rookie champion Charles Leclerc, who finished fourth, entered the series with ART, with backing from Scuderia Ferrari.
- 2015 MotorSport Vision Formula Three Cup and Asian Le Mans Series runner-up Akash Nandy moved to the series with Jenzer Motorsport.
- McLaren junior driver Nyck de Vries, who finished third in the 2015 Formula Renault 3.5 Series season, joined the series with ART Grand Prix.

Changing teams

- Antonio Fuoco and Sandy Stuvik, who raced with Carlin and Status Grand Prix in 2015 respectively, switched to Trident.
- Ralph Boschung, who raced with Jenzer in 2015, moved to Koiranen.
- Óscar Tunjo, who won race at Spielberg with Trident in 2015, switched to Jenzer.

Leaving GP3

- Aleksander Bosak, who competed for Arden International in the 2015 season, switched to Formula V8 3.5 with Pons Racing.
- 2015 runner-up Luca Ghiotto left the series to continue his collaboration with Trident in GP2 Series, while Marvin Kirchhöfer, who finished behind Ghiotto also graduated to GP2 with Carlin.
- Jann Mardenborough, who finished ninth for Carlin in 2015, left the series to compete in both Super GT and All-Japan F3.
- Seb Morris, who raced with Status Grand Prix in the 2015 season, left the series to race in British GT with Team Parker Racing.
- 2015 season champion Esteban Ocon left the series as the reigning champion is not permitted to continue competing in the series. He joined the DTM with Mercedes-Benz.

Mid-season changes

- European Formula 3 driver Arjun Maini replaced Óscar Tunjo at Jenzer Motorsport from the Silverstone round onwards.
- Ralph Boschung was replaced by 2015 SMP F4 Championship winner Niko Kari, for the Spa round, with the team citing financial reasons for the decision.
- Alessio Lorandi joined Jenzer Motorsport for the last two rounds at Sepang and Yas Marina.

=== Team changes ===
- After having competed in the series since its inaugural season, Carlin and Status Grand Prix left the championship due to lack of sponsorships.
- DAMS, which operates across multiple single-seater championships, left Formula Renault 3.5 Series to join the GP3 series.
- Virtuosi Racing were scheduled to enter, but were removed from the entry list before the season.

== Calendar ==
On 4 March 2016, the full calendar was revealed with nine rounds taking place.

Round		Circuit/Location	Country	Date	Supporting
1	R1	Circuit de Barcelona-Catalunya, Barcelona	Spain	14 May	Spanish Grand Prix
1	R2	Circuit de Barcelona-Catalunya, Barcelona	Spain	15 May	Spanish Grand Prix
2	R1	Red Bull Ring, Spielberg	Austria	2 July	Austrian Grand Prix
2	R2	Red Bull Ring, Spielberg	Austria	3 July	Austrian Grand Prix
3	R1	Silverstone Circuit, Silverstone	United Kingdom	9 July	British Grand Prix
3	R2	Silverstone Circuit, Silverstone	United Kingdom	10 July	British Grand Prix
4	R1	Hungaroring, Budapest	Hungary	23 July	Hungarian Grand Prix
4	R2	Hungaroring, Budapest	Hungary	24 July	Hungarian Grand Prix
5	R1	Hockenheimring, Hockenheim	Germany	30 July	German Grand Prix
5	R2	Hockenheimring, Hockenheim	Germany	31 July	German Grand Prix
6	R1	Circuit de Spa-Francorchamps, Francorchamps	Belgium	27 August	Belgian Grand Prix
6	R2	Circuit de Spa-Francorchamps, Francorchamps	Belgium	28 August	Belgian Grand Prix
7	R1	Autodromo Nazionale Monza, Monza	Italy	3 September	Italian Grand Prix
7	R2	Autodromo Nazionale Monza, Monza	Italy	4 September	Italian Grand Prix
8	R1	Sepang International Circuit, Sepang	Malaysia	1 October	Malaysian Grand Prix
8	R2	Sepang International Circuit, Sepang	Malaysia	2 October	Malaysian Grand Prix
9	R1	Yas Marina Circuit, Abu Dhabi	United Arab Emirates	26 November	Abu Dhabi Grand Prix
9	R2	Yas Marina Circuit, Abu Dhabi	United Arab Emirates	27 November	Abu Dhabi Grand Prix

=== Calendar changes ===
- The series will return to the Hockenheimring in support of the German Grand Prix, and will make its début at the Sepang International Circuit.
- The rounds at the Sochi Autodrom and the Bahrain International Circuit were discontinued for the 2016 season.

== Results ==
=== Season summary ===
Round		Circuit	Pole position	Fastest lap	Winning driver	Winning team	Report
1	R1	(Spain) Circuit de Barcelona-Catalunya	(United Kingdom) Jake Hughes	(Monaco) Charles Leclerc	(Monaco) Charles Leclerc	(France) ART Grand Prix	Report
1	R2	(Spain) Circuit de Barcelona-Catalunya		(Colombia) Óscar Tunjo	(Thailand) Alexander Albon	(France) ART Grand Prix	Report
2	R1	(Austria) Red Bull Ring	(Monaco) Charles Leclerc	(Monaco) Charles Leclerc	(Monaco) Charles Leclerc	(France) ART Grand Prix	Report
2	R2	(Austria) Red Bull Ring		(Switzerland) Ralph Boschung	(Switzerland) Ralph Boschung	(Finland) Koiranen GP	Report
3	R1	(United Kingdom) Silverstone Circuit	(Thailand) Alexander Albon	(Thailand) Alexander Albon	(Thailand) Alexander Albon	(France) ART Grand Prix	Report
3	R2	(United Kingdom) Silverstone Circuit		(Thailand) Alexander Albon (Note: Alexander Albon set the fastest lap, but did not finish in the top 10, so was ineligible to be the point-scorer for the fastest lap. Jake Dennis was the point-scorer instead for setting the fastest lap of those finishing in the top 10.)	(Italy) Antonio Fuoco	(Italy) Trident	Report
4	R1	(Hungary) Hungaroring	(Netherlands) Nyck de Vries	(Netherlands) Nyck de Vries (Note: Nyck de Vries set the fastest lap, but did not finish in the top 10, so was ineligible to be the point-scorer for the fastest lap. Jake Dennis was the point-scorer instead for setting the fastest lap of those finishing in the top 10.)	(United Kingdom) Matt Parry	(Finland) Koiranen GP	Report
4	R2	(Hungary) Hungaroring		(Thailand) Alexander Albon	(Thailand) Alexander Albon	(France) ART Grand Prix	Report
5	R1	(Germany) Hockenheimring	(Thailand) Alexander Albon	(Monaco) Charles Leclerc	(Italy) Antonio Fuoco	(Italy) Trident	Report
5	R2	(Germany) Hockenheimring		(United Kingdom) Jake Hughes	(United Kingdom) Jake Hughes	(France) DAMS	Report
6	R1	(Belgium) Circuit de Spa-Francorchamps	(Monaco) Charles Leclerc	(Monaco) Charles Leclerc	(Monaco) Charles Leclerc	(France) ART Grand Prix	Report
6	R2	(Belgium) Circuit de Spa-Francorchamps		(United Kingdom) Jack Aitken	(United Kingdom) Jack Aitken	(United Kingdom) Arden International	Report
7	R1	(Italy) Autodromo Nazionale Monza	(Monaco) Charles Leclerc	(United Kingdom) Jake Hughes	(United Kingdom) Jake Dennis	(United Kingdom) Arden International	Report
7	R2	(Italy) Autodromo Nazionale Monza		(Netherlands) Nyck de Vries	(Netherlands) Nyck de Vries	(France) ART Grand Prix	Report
8	R1	(Malaysia) Sepang International Circuit	(Monaco) Charles Leclerc	(Thailand) Alexander Albon	(Thailand) Alexander Albon	(France) ART Grand Prix	Report
8	R2	(Malaysia) Sepang International Circuit		(Italy) Antonio Fuoco (Note: Antonio Fuoco set the fastest lap, but did not finish in the top 10, so was ineligible to be the point-scorer for the fastest lap. Jake Dennis was the point-scorer instead for setting the fastest lap of those finishing in the top 10.)	(United Kingdom) Jake Dennis	(United Kingdom) Arden International	Report
9	R1	(United Arab Emirates) Yas Marina Circuit	(Thailand) Alexander Albon	(United Kingdom) Jack Aitken	(Netherlands) Nyck de Vries	(France) ART Grand Prix	Report
9	R2	(United Arab Emirates) Yas Marina Circuit		(United Kingdom) Jake Dennis	(United Kingdom) Jake Hughes	(France) DAMS	Report

== Championship standings ==
=== Scoring system ===
Points were awarded to the top 10 classified finishers in the race 1, and to the top 8 classified finishers in the race 2. The pole-sitter in the race 1 also received four points, and two points were given to the driver who set the fastest lap inside the top ten in both the race 1 and race 2. No extra points were awarded to the pole-sitter in the race 2.

Race 1 points

Position	**1st**	**2nd**	**3rd**	**4th**	**5th**	**6th**	**7th**	**8th**	**9th**	**10th**	**Pole**	**FL**
Points	25	18	15	12	10	8	6	4	2	1	4	2

Race 2 points

Points were awarded to the top 8 classified finishers.

Position	**1st**	**2nd**	**3rd**	**4th**	**5th**	**6th**	**7th**	**8th**	**FL**
Points	15	12	10	8	6	4	2	1	2

=== Drivers' championship ===
Pos.	Driver	CAT (Spain)		RBR (Austria)		SIL (United Kingdom)		HUN (Hungary)		HOC (Germany)		SPA (Belgium)		MNZ (Italy)		SEP (Malaysia)		YMC (United Arab Emirates)		Points
Pos.	Driver	R1	R2	R1	R2	R1	R2	R1	R2	R1	R2	R1	R2	R1	R2	R1	R2	R1	R2	Points
1	(Monaco) Charles Leclerc	1	9	**1**	Ret	2	3	6	3	5	3	**1**	6	**4**	Ret	**3**	5	Ret	9	202
2	(Thailand) Alexander Albon	6	1	2	2	**1**	14	7	1	**4**	Ret	9	10	6	2	1	8	**Ret**	Ret	177
3	(Italy) Antonio Fuoco	4	3	5	3	3	1	2	10	1	18†	4	2	8	3	8	Ret	16	17	157
4	(United Kingdom) Jake Dennis	7	4	Ret	Ret	12	9	3	7	12	6	2	5	1	4	6	1	2	4	149
5	(United Kingdom) Jack Aitken	20	19	9	5	13	6	9	6	6	2	5	1	2	5	2	3	3	2	148
6	(Netherlands) Nyck de Vries	9	5	3	4	5	8	**20**	13	2	8	3	8	7	1	13	6	1	11	133
7	(Japan) Nirei Fukuzumi	3	13	7	Ret	11	7	4	4	Ret	11	Ret	15	5	Ret	7	2	5	3	91
8	(United Kingdom) Jake Hughes	**2**	8	8	6	Ret	17	23	19	8	1	Ret	Ret	3	10	Ret	12	7	1	90
9	(United Kingdom) Matt Parry	12	20	6	7	4	16	1	5	3	7	Ret	Ret	9	17	9	4	Ret	12	82
10	(India) Arjun Maini					8	19	8	2	7	5	Ret	16	14	6	4	7	14	14	50
11	(Switzerland) Ralph Boschung	10	10	4	1	6	12	5	22	15	Ret			18	9					48
12	(United States) Santino Ferrucci	15	11	15	10	18	4	15	11	9	4	7	3	19†	11	Ret	Ret	9	15	36
13	(Netherlands) Steijn Schothorst	Ret	22	20	12	14	5	22	20	Ret	17	6	7	13	13	5	10	6	7	36
14	(Switzerland) Kevin Jörg	5	7	13	14	15	11	10	9	14	10	11	Ret	NC	12	12	11	4	8	26
15	(Spain) Álex Palou	19	14	16	11	10	2	11	14	16	19†	13	11	11	7	14	19	10	5	22
16	(Colombia) Óscar Tunjo	8	2	14	13							15	DNS							18
17	(Russia) Matevos Isaakyan	11	6	Ret	Ret	21	18	12	8	Ret	13	8	4	Ret	Ret	15	14	Ret	16	17
18	(Thailand) Sandy Stuvik	18	15	10	8	7	10	18	18	Ret	12	Ret	17†	12	15	10	20	15	18	9
19	(Russia) Konstantin Tereshchenko	17	21	18	Ret	20	13	16	17	Ret	15	17	Ret	17	14	17	17	8	6	8
20	(Poland) Artur Janosz	16	12	11	9	9	15	14	12	11	Ret	12	9	16	8	Ret	16	Ret	19	3
21	(Colombia) Tatiana Calderón	14	18	17	Ret	17	20	21	21	10	9	14	Ret	10	16	Ret	15	Ret	Ret	2
22	(France) Giuliano Alesi	22	16	DNS	DNS	16	Ret	19	16	Ret	14	10	12	DNS	19	16	13	11	10	1
23	(Italy) Alessio Lorandi															11	9	12	20	0
24	(Malaysia) Akash Nandy	21	23	12	Ret	19	21	17	Ret	13	16	16	13	15	18	Ret	18	13	13	0
25	(Slovakia) Richard Gonda	13	17	19	Ret			13	15											0
26	(Finland) Niko Kari											Ret	14							0
27	(India) Mahaveer Raghunathan	23	24																	0
Pos.	Driver	R1	R2	R1	R2	R1	R2	R1	R2	R1	R2	R1	R2	R1	R2	R1	R2	R1	R2	Points
Pos.	Driver	CAT (Spain)		RBR (Austria)		SIL (United Kingdom)		HUN (Hungary)		HOC (Germany)		SPA (Belgium)		MNZ (Italy)		SEP (Malaysia)		YMC (United Arab Emirates)		Points

Key
Colour	Result
Gold	Winner
Silver	2nd place
Bronze	3rd place
Green	Other points position
Blue	Other classified position
Blue	Not classified, finished (NC)
Purple	Not classified, retired (Ret)
Red	Did not qualify (DNQ)
Red	Did not pre-qualify (DNPQ)
Black	Disqualified (DSQ)
White	Did not start (DNS)
White	Race cancelled (C)
Blank	Did not practice (DNP)
Blank	Excluded (EX)
Blank	Did not arrive (DNA)
Blank	Withdrawn (WD)
Text formatting	Meaning
**Bold**	Pole position point(s)
Italics	Fastest lap point(s)

Notes:

- † — Drivers did not finish the race, but were classified as they completed over 90% of the race distance.

=== Teams' championship ===
Only three best-finishing cars are allowed to score points in the championship.

Pos.	Team	CAT (Spain)		RBR (Austria)		SIL (United Kingdom)		HUN (Hungary)		HOC (Germany)		SPA (Belgium)		MNZ (Italy)		SEP (Malaysia)		YMC (United Arab Emirates)		Points
Pos.	Team	R1	R2	R1	R2	R1	R2	R1	R2	R1	R2	R1	R2	R1	R2	R1	R2	R1	R2	Points
1	(France) ART Grand Prix	1	1	**1**	2	**1**	3	4	1	2	3	**1**	6	**4**	1	1	2	1	3	588
1	(France) ART Grand Prix	3	5	2	4	2	7	6	3	**4**	8	3	8	5	2	**3**	5	5	9	588
1	(France) ART Grand Prix	6	9	3	Ret	5	8	7	4	5	11	9	10	6	Ret	7	6	**Ret**	11	588
2	(United Kingdom) Arden International	7	4	9	5	12	6	3	6	6	2	2	1	1	4	2	1	2	2	297
2	(United Kingdom) Arden International	14	18	17	Ret	13	9	9	7	10	6	5	5	2	5	6	3	3	4	297
2	(United Kingdom) Arden International	20	19	Ret	Ret	17	20	21	21	12	9	Ret	Ret	10	16	Ret	15	Ret	Ret	297
3	(Italy) Trident	4	3	5	3	3	1	2	10	1	12	4	2	8	3	8	13	11	10	170
3	(Italy) Trident	16	12	10	8	7	10	14	12	11	14	10	9	12	8	10	16	15	17	170
3	(Italy) Trident	18	15	11	9	9	15	18	16	Ret	Ret	12	12	16	15	16	20	16	18	170
4	(France) DAMS	**2**	7	8	6	15	4	10	9	8	1	7	3	3	10	12	11	4	1	152
4	(France) DAMS	5	8	13	10	18	11	15	11	9	4	11	Ret	19†	11	Ret	12	7	8	152
4	(France) DAMS	15	11	15	14	Ret	17	23	19	14	10	Ret	Ret	NC	12	Ret	Ret	9	15	152
5	(Finland) Koiranen GP	10	6	4	1	4	12	1	5	3	7	8	4	9	9	9	4	Ret	12	147
5	(Finland) Koiranen GP	11	10	6	7	5	16	5	8	15	13	Ret	14	18	17	15	14	Ret	16	147
5	(Finland) Koiranen GP	12	20	Ret	Ret	21	18	12	22	Ret	Ret	Ret	Ret	Ret	Ret					147
6	(Switzerland) Jenzer Motorsport	8	2	12	13	8	19	8	2	7	5	15	13	14	6	4	7	12	13	68
6	(Switzerland) Jenzer Motorsport	13	17	14	Ret	19	21	13	15	13	16	16	16	15	18	11	9	13	14	68
6	(Switzerland) Jenzer Motorsport	21	23	19	Ret			17	Ret			Ret	DNS			Ret	18	14	20	68
7	(Spain) Campos Racing	17	14	16	11	10	2	11	14	16	15	6	7	11	7	5	10	6	5	66
7	(Spain) Campos Racing	19	21	18	12	14	5	16	17	Ret	17	13	11	13	13	14	17	8	6	66
7	(Spain) Campos Racing	Ret	22	20	Ret	20	13	22	20	Ret	Ret	17	Ret	17	14	17	19	10	7	66
Pos.	Team	R1	R2	R1	R2	R1	R2	R1	R2	R1	R2	R1	R2	R1	R2	R1	R2	R1	R2	Points
Pos.	Team	CAT (Spain)		RBR (Austria)		SIL (United Kingdom)		HUN (Hungary)		HOC (Germany)		SPA (Belgium)		MNZ (Italy)		SEP (Malaysia)		YMC (United Arab Emirates)		Points

Key
Colour	Result
Gold	Winner
Silver	2nd place
Bronze	3rd place
Green	Other points position
Blue	Other classified position
Blue	Not classified, finished (NC)
Purple	Not classified, retired (Ret)
Red	Did not qualify (DNQ)
Red	Did not pre-qualify (DNPQ)
Black	Disqualified (DSQ)
White	Did not start (DNS)
White	Race cancelled (C)
Blank	Did not practice (DNP)
Blank	Excluded (EX)
Blank	Did not arrive (DNA)
Blank	Withdrawn (WD)
Text formatting	Meaning
**Bold**	Pole position point(s)
Italics	Fastest lap point(s)

Notes:

- † — Drivers did not finish the race, but were classified as they completed over 90% of the race distance.
