= Philo Paz Armand =

Indonesian racing driver (born 1996)

- Nationality: (Indonesia) Indonesian
- Born: Philo Paz Patric Armand; 12 March 1996 (age 30) Jakarta, Indonesia

Previous series
- 2015; 2014; 2013–2014; 2013; 2012: Formula Renault 3.5 Series; Eurocup Formula Renault 2.0; Formula Renault 2.0 Alps; Formula Renault 2.0 NEC; FR2.0 BARC Winter Series

Philo Paz Patric Armand (born 12 March 1996) is an Indonesian former racing driver who most recently competed in the 2016 GP2 Series for Trident Motorsport.

== Career ==
=== Karting ===
Born in Jakarta, Armand began karting in 2006, winning the Formula Cadet class of the Indonesian Karting Championship the following year. In 2009, he won the Junior class of the Indonesian Karting Championship and finished 13th in the Asia-Pacific KF3 Championship. In 2011, he finished fourth in the Asia-Pacific KF1 Championship, and during the year he also became an official driver of the Tony Kart Racing Team.

During his final year of karting in 2012, Armand finished 14th in the CIK-FIA KF1 Karting World Championship, a title won by teammate Flavio Camponeschi.

=== Formula Renault 2.0 ===
After making his single-seater debut in the Formula Renault BARC Winter Series in late 2012, Armand joined Fortec Motorsports to contest the 2013 Formula Renault 2.0 NEC season. He finished 28th in the championship, with a best race result of eleventh coming in the final round in Zandvoort. He also contested four races of the Formula Renault 2.0 Alps championship as a guest driver with Tech 1 Racing.

Armand switched to Formula Renault 2.0 Alps for a full-time campaign with Tech 1 Racing for the 2014 season. He finished 18th in the championship, with a best race result of fourth coming at the second round in Pau. He also took part in two rounds of the Eurocup Formula Renault 2.0 season with the team.

=== Formula Renault 3.5 Series ===
In 2015, Armand graduated to the Formula Renault 3.5 Series, racing alongside Roberto Merhi at Pons Racing.

=== GP2 Series ===
In 2016, Armand joined Trident Racing for the 2016 GP2 Series. He failed to score points and finished 24th in the standings; as of 2026 this was Armand's last season in motorsport.

== Racing record ==
=== Career summary ===
Season	Series	Team	Races	Wins	Poles	F/Laps	Podiums	Points	Position
2012	Formula Renault BARC Winter Series	Fortec Motorsports	2	0	0	0	0	0	NC†
2013	Formula Renault 2.0 NEC	Fortec Motorsports	16	0	0	0	0	45	28th
2013	Formula Renault 2.0 Alps	Tech 1 Racing	4	0	0	0	0	0	NC†
2014	Formula Renault 2.0 Alps	Tech 1 Racing	14	0	0	0	0	23	18th
2014	Eurocup Formula Renault 2.0	Tech 1 Racing	4	0	0	0	0	0	NC†
2015	Formula Renault 3.5 Series	Pons Racing	9	0	0	0	0	1	26th
2016	GP2 Series	Trident Racing	22	0	0	0	0	0	24th

^{†} As Armand was a guest driver, he was ineligible for championship points.

=== Complete Formula Renault 2.0 Northern European Cup results ===
(key) (Races in bold indicate pole position; races in italics indicate fastest lap)

Year	Team	1	2	3	4	5	6	7	8	9	10	11	12	13	14	15	16	17	Pos	Points
2013	Fortec Motorsports	HOC; 1; 22	HOC; 2; 20	HOC; 3; 33	NÜR; 1; 17	NÜR; 2; 22	SIL; 1; 15	SIL; 2; 15	SPA; 1; 15	SPA; 2; 16	ASS; 1; 21	ASS; 2; 17	MST; 1; 18	MST; 2; 22	MST; 3; 23	ZAN; 1 Ret	ZAN; 2; 11	ZAN; 3 C	28th	45

=== Complete Formula Renault 2.0 Alps Series results ===
(key) (Races in bold indicate pole position; races in italics indicate fastest lap)

Year	Team	1	2	3	4	5	6	7	8	9	10	11	12	13	14	Pos	Points
2013	Tech 1 Racing	VLL; 1	VLL; 2	IMO1; 1	IMO1; 2	SPA; 1	SPA; 2	MNZ; 1; 21	MNZ; 2 Ret	MIS; 1	MIS; 2	MUG; 1	MUG; 2	IMO2; 1; 22	IMO2; 2 Ret	NC†	0
2014	Tech 1 Racing	IMO; 1; 21	IMO; 2; 22	PAU; 1 Ret	PAU; 2; 4	RBR; 1; 14	RBR; 2 Ret	SPA; 1; 7	SPA; 2; 11	MNZ; 1 Ret	MNZ; 2; 8	MUG; 1; 24	MUG; 2; 28	JER; 1; 25	JER; 2; 23	18th	23

† As Armand was a guest driver, he was ineligible for points

=== Complete Eurocup Formula Renault 2.0 results ===
(key) (Races in bold indicate pole position; races in italics indicate fastest lap)

Year	Entrant	1	2	3	4	5	6	7	8	9	10	11	12	13	14	DC	Points
2014	Tech 1 Racing	ALC; 1	ALC; 2	SPA; 1; 29	SPA; 2; 27	MSC; 1	MSC; 2	NÜR; 1	NÜR; 2	HUN; 1	HUN; 2	LEC; 1; 17	LEC; 2 Ret	JER; 1	JER; 2	NC†	0

† As Armand was a guest driver, he was ineligible for points

=== Complete Formula Renault 3.5 Series results ===
(key) (Races in bold indicate pole position) (Races in italics indicate fastest lap)

Year	Team	1	2	3	4	5	6	7	8	9	10	11	12	13	14	15	16	17	Pos.	Points
2015	Pons Racing	ALC; 1; 13	ALC; 2; 17	MON; 1; 10	SPA; 1; 16	SPA; 2; 15	HUN; 1; 13	HUN; 2 Ret	RBR; 1	RBR; 2	SIL; 1 Ret	SIL; 2; 16	NÜR; 1	NÜR; 2	BUG; 1	BUG; 2	JER; 1	JER; 2	26th	1

=== Complete GP2 Series results ===
(key) (Races in bold indicate pole position) (Races in italics indicate fastest lap)

Year	Entrant	1	2	3	4	5	6	7	8	9	10	11	12	13	14	15	16	17	18	19	20	21	22	DC	Points
2016	Trident	CAT; FEA; Ret	CAT; SPR; Ret	MON; FEA; 16	MON; SPR; Ret	BAK; FEA; Ret	BAK; SPR; Ret	RBR; FEA; 15	RBR; SPR; 14	SIL; FEA; 20	SIL; SPR; 20	HUN; FEA; 19	HUN; SPR; 15	HOC; FEA; 16	HOC; SPR; Ret	SPA; FEA; 20	SPA; SPR; 19	MNZ; FEA; 19	MNZ; SPR; 17	MAL; FEA; 19	MAL; SPR; Ret	YMC; FEA; 16	YMC; SPR; 18	24th	0
