= 2014 Eurocup Formula Renault 2.0 =

Motor racing competition

Seasons
- ← 2013 2015 →

The 2014 Eurocup Formula Renault 2.0 season was a multi-event motor racing championship for open wheel, formula racing cars held across Europe. The championship featured drivers competing in 2 litre Formula Renault single seat race cars that conformed to the technical regulations for the championship. The 2014 season was the 24th Eurocup Formula Renault 2.0 season organised by Renault Sport. The season began at Motorland Aragón on 26 April and finished on 19 October at Jerez. The series formed part of the World Series by Renault meetings at seven double header events.

The championship titles were secured by driver Nyck de Vries, who spent his third season in the series and his team Koiranen GP. Series débutant Dennis Olsen finished as runner-up with wins at Spa-Francorchamps and the Nürburgring. Alexander Albon, who raced for KTR, completed the top three in the drivers' standings; all three drivers received a prize test in a Formula Renault 3.5 Series car. Manor Motorsport MP Motorsport driver Andrea Pizzitola was victorious at Motorland Aragón and the Hungaroring and finished fourth. Olsen's teammate Bruno Bonifacio won the other race at Spa, finishing in fifth position in the standings. Kevin Jörg, who finished behind Bonifacio, achieved a win at Moscow Raceway. The other wins were taken by Fortec Motorsports driver Jack Aitken at the Hungaroring, ART Junior Team driver Aurélien Panis at Moscow Raceway, while guest driver George Russell took a victory at Jerez.

== Teams and drivers ==
Team	No.	Driver name	Class	Rounds
(France) Tech 1 Racing	1	(France) Anthoine Hubert	J	All
(France) Tech 1 Racing	2	(Russia) Vasily Romanov	J	1–5
(France) Tech 1 Racing	2	(United Kingdom) George Russell		7
(France) Tech 1 Racing	3	(Russia) Egor Orudzhev		All
(France) Tech 1 Racing	44	(Canada) Luke Chudleigh		1–2, 5
(France) Tech 1 Racing	44	(Switzerland) Hugo de Sadeleer		6
(France) Tech 1 Racing	47	(Malaysia) Akash Nandy		2
(France) Tech 1 Racing	48	(Indonesia) Philo Paz Patric Armand		2, 6
(France) ART Junior Team	4	(France) Aurélien Panis		All
(France) ART Junior Team	5	(Switzerland) Levin Amweg		1–4, 6–7
(France) ART Junior Team	5	(France) Simon Gachet		5
(France) ART Junior Team	6	(South Africa) Callan O'Keeffe	J	1–5
(France) ART Junior Team	6	(France) Simon Gachet		6–7
(United Kingdom) Fortec Motorsports	7	(United Kingdom) Matt Parry		All
(United Kingdom) Fortec Motorsports	8	(United Kingdom) Jack Aitken		All
(United Kingdom) Fortec Motorsports	9	(Estonia) Martin Rump		All
(United Kingdom) Fortec Motorsports	51	(Monaco) Charles Leclerc		2, 4–5
(United Kingdom) Fortec Motorsports	51	(United Kingdom) Ben Barnicoat		7
(United Kingdom) Fortec Motorsports	52	(Brazil) Thiago Vivacqua		2
(Netherlands) Manor MP Motorsport	10	(France) Andrea Pizzitola		All
(Netherlands) Manor MP Motorsport	11	(Netherlands) Steijn Schothorst		All
(Netherlands) Manor MP Motorsport	49	(Ecuador) Julio Moreno		2, 4
(Germany) Josef Kaufmann Racing	14	(Sweden) Gustav Malja		All
(Germany) Josef Kaufmann Racing	15	(Switzerland) Kevin Jörg		All
(Germany) Josef Kaufmann Racing	16	(United States) Ryan Tveter		1–6
(Germany) Josef Kaufmann Racing	50	(Switzerland) Louis Delétraz	J	4
(Finland) Koiranen GP	17	(New Zealand) Nick Cassidy		1–5
(Finland) Koiranen GP	17	(China) Ye Hongli		6–7
(Finland) Koiranen GP	18	(Italy) Ignazio D'Agosto		1–6
(Finland) Koiranen GP	18	(Austria) Stefan Riener		7
(Finland) Koiranen GP	19	(Netherlands) Nyck de Vries		All
(Finland) Koiranen GP	58	(United Kingdom) George Russell	J	3
(Finland) Koiranen GP	62	(Brazil) Pietro Fittipaldi		7
(Italy) Prema Powerteam	20	(Brazil) Bruno Bonifacio		All
(Italy) Prema Powerteam	21	(Estonia) Hans Villemi		All
(Italy) Prema Powerteam	22	(Norway) Dennis Olsen	J	All
(Italy) Prema Powerteam	53	(Poland) Alex Bosak		2
(Belgium) KTR	23	(Thailand) Alexander Albon	J	All
(Belgium) KTR	24	(United Kingdom) Gregor Ramsay	J	All
(Belgium) KTR	25	(France) Jules Gounon		1
(Belgium) KTR	25	(South Africa) Callan O'Keeffe	J	6–7
(France) ARTA Engineering	26	(Australia) James Allen	J	1–2, 4–7
(France) ARTA Engineering	27	(Switzerland) Darius Oskoui	J	1
(France) ARTA Engineering	28	(France) Simon Gachet		1–4
(Austria) China BRT by JCS	35	(Brazil) Victor Franzoni		4
(Austria) China BRT by JCS	36	(Czech Republic) Josef Záruba		4
(Spain) AVF	38	(Netherlands) Roy Geerts		1
(Spain) AVF	38	(Czech Republic) Josef Záruba		2
(Spain) AVF	38	(France) Jules Gounon		6
(Spain) AVF	39	(Spain) Iñigo Bikuña	J	1
(Spain) AVF	39	(Switzerland) Louis Delétraz		2, 6
(Spain) AVF	40	(United Kingdom) Matthew Graham	J	1–2
(Italy) JD Motorsport	45	(Russia) Matevos Isaakyan	J	1–3
(Italy) JD Motorsport	46	(Russia) Denis Korneev		1–3
(Italy) JD Motorsport	46	(Brazil) Thiago Vivacqua		7
(Italy) BVM Racing	54	(Italy) Dario Capitanio		2
(Italy) BVM Racing	54	(Ukraine) Danylo Pronenko		3, 7
(Italy) BVM Racing	55	(Russia) Semen Evstigneev		2–3
(United Kingdom) Mark Burdett Motorsport	56	(United Kingdom) Jake Hughes		2
(United Kingdom) Mark Burdett Motorsport	57	(United Kingdom) Raoul Owens		2, 4
(Sweden) Fragus BR Motorsport	59	(Sweden) Robin Hansson	J	4
(United Kingdom) Strakka Racing	60	(United Kingdom) Jake Hughes		5, 7
(United Kingdom) Strakka Racing	61	(United Kingdom) Matthew Graham	J	5

Icon	Class
J	Junior Class

== Race calendar and results ==
The calendar for the 2014 season was announced on 20 October 2013, in the final day of the 2013 season. All seven rounds formed meetings of the 2014 World Series by Renault season. The championship visited the Circuito de Jerez for the first time and returned to the Nürburgring. The Red Bull Ring and Barcelona were removed from the schedule.

Round		Circuit	Country	Date	Pole position	Fastest lap	Winning driver	Winning team
1	R1	Ciudad del Motor de Aragón, Alcañiz	Spain	26 April	(Netherlands) Nyck de Vries	(Russia) Egor Orudzhev	(Netherlands) Nyck de Vries	(Finland) Koiranen GP
1	R2	Ciudad del Motor de Aragón, Alcañiz	Spain	27 April	(France) Andrea Pizzitola	(Russia) Egor Orudzhev	(France) Andrea Pizzitola	(Netherlands) Manor MP Motorsport
2	R1	Circuit de Spa-Francorchamps	Belgium	31 May	(Netherlands) Nyck de Vries	(Norway) Dennis Olsen	(Norway) Dennis Olsen	(Italy) Prema Powerteam
2	R2	Circuit de Spa-Francorchamps	Belgium	1 June	(Netherlands) Nyck de Vries	(Norway) Dennis Olsen	(Brazil) Bruno Bonifacio	(Italy) Prema Powerteam
3	R1	Moscow Raceway	Russia	28 June	(France) Aurélien Panis	(Russia) Egor Orudzhev	(France) Aurélien Panis	(France) ART Junior Team
3	R2	Moscow Raceway	Russia	29 June	(Netherlands) Nyck de Vries	(South Africa) Callan O'Keeffe	(Switzerland) Kevin Jörg	(Germany) Josef Kaufmann Racing
4	R1	Nürburgring	Germany	12 July	(Thailand) Alexander Albon	(Netherlands) Nyck de Vries	(Netherlands) Nyck de Vries	(Finland) Koiranen GP
4	R2	Nürburgring	Germany	13 July	(Norway) Dennis Olsen	(Norway) Dennis Olsen	(Norway) Dennis Olsen	(Italy) Prema Powerteam
5	R1	Hungaroring, Mogyoród	Hungary	13 September	(France) Andrea Pizzitola	(Netherlands) Nyck de Vries	(France) Andrea Pizzitola	(Netherlands) Manor MP Motorsport
5	R2	Hungaroring, Mogyoród	Hungary	14 September	(United Kingdom) Jack Aitken	(United Kingdom) Jake Hughes	(United Kingdom) Jack Aitken	(United Kingdom) Fortec Motorsports
6	R1	Circuit Paul Ricard, Le Castellet	France	27 September	(Netherlands) Nyck de Vries	(Netherlands) Nyck de Vries	(Netherlands) Nyck de Vries	(Finland) Koiranen GP
6	R2	Circuit Paul Ricard, Le Castellet	France	28 September	(Netherlands) Nyck de Vries	(Netherlands) Nyck de Vries	(Netherlands) Nyck de Vries	(Finland) Koiranen GP
7	R1	Circuito de Jerez	Spain	18 October	(Norway) Dennis Olsen	(Netherlands) Nyck de Vries	(Netherlands) Nyck de Vries	(Finland) Koiranen GP
7	R2	Circuito de Jerez	Spain	19 October	(United Kingdom) George Russell	(United Kingdom) George Russell	(United Kingdom) George Russell	(France) Tech 1 Racing

== Championship standings ==
- Points for both championships were awarded as follows:

1st	2nd	3rd	4th	5th	6th	7th	8th	9th	10th
25	18	15	12	10	8	6	4	2	1

=== Drivers' Championship ===
Pos	Driver	ARA (Spain)		SPA (Belgium)		MSC (Russia)		NÜR (Germany)		HUN (Hungary)		LEC (France)		JER (Spain)		Points
Pos	Driver	1	2	3	4	5	6	7	8	9	10	11	12	13	14	Points
1	(Netherlands) Nyck de Vries	**1**	4	**2**	**3**	Ret	**2**	1	4	3	7	**1**	**1**	1	2	254
2	(Norway) Dennis Olsen	13	8	1	2	9	5	4	**1**	9	8	6	Ret	**DSQ**	7	124
3	(Thailand) Alexander Albon	4	9	4	37	11	3	**2**	13	7	6	3	13	4	5	117
4	(France) Andrea Pizzitola	Ret	**1**	15	10	2	6	7	10	**1**	9	5	8	13	22	108
5	(Brazil) Bruno Bonifacio	3	3	3	1	16	DNS	20	Ret	8	Ret	8	Ret	7	13	88
6	(Switzerland) Kevin Jörg	15	2	7	14	7	1	10	Ret	13	11	7	6	Ret	4	87
7	(United Kingdom) Jack Aitken	19	27	17	20	Ret	12	3	6	18	**1**	21	12	2	3	86
8	(Russia) Egor Orudzhev	2	25	6	9	6	9	Ret	9	11	Ret	2	3	11	Ret	83
9	(France) Aurélien Panis	5	Ret	8	28	**1**	8	11	11	DSQ	14	4	2	9	17	82
10	(Italy) Ignazio D'Agosto	8	16	10	12	13	14	6	3	6	3	14	4			73
11	(United Kingdom) Matt Parry	7	Ret	Ret	11	3	4	29	14	12	5	Ret	10	Ret	6	57
12	(Sweden) Gustav Malja	6	10	32	21	14	17	14	12	5	4	9	7	Ret	10	49
13	(Switzerland) Levin Amweg	12	5	5	5	4	23	23	Ret			19	11	12	19	42
14	(Estonia) Hans Villemi	Ret	14	11	8	17	15	15	16	4	18	10	Ret	3	12	38
15	(France) Anthoine Hubert	18	7	9	6	10	13	19	15	14	16	12	9	6	16	30
16	(South Africa) Callan O'Keeffe	Ret	Ret	13	4	5	10	28	Ret	DSQ	20	22	15	10	11	28
17	(Netherlands) Steijn Schothorst	11	13	Ret	13	21	16	13	17	19	10	13	5	8	9	24
18	(New Zealand) Nick Cassidy	14	11	12	17	25	25	8	5	10	Ret					20
19	(France) Simon Gachet	9	6	18	15	18	Ret	21	18	DSQ	19	23	16	16	20	10
20	(Estonia) Martin Rump	Ret	17	14	26	22	19	12	8	16	Ret	11	Ret	15	Ret	8
21	(Brazil) Victor Franzoni							9	19							4
22	(United Kingdom) Matthew Graham	10	18	21	18					17	Ret					1
23	(United States) Ryan Tveter	23	12	23	Ret	12	11	22	Ret	23	13	15	Ret			1
24	(United Kingdom) Gregor Ramsay	17	21	22	32	24	21	16	20	15	17	Ret	14	14	18	0
25	(Russia) Vasily Romanov	21	23	34	34	20	24	Ret	21	21	15					0
26	(Netherlands) Roy Geerts	16	19													0
27	(Australia) James Allen	24	22	31	Ret			27	25	22	22	20	17	17	24	0
28	(Czech Republic) Josef Záruba			33	33			18	24							0
29	(Spain) Iñigo Bikuña	26	24													0
30	(France) Jules Gounon	25	26									Ret	Ret			0
	(Switzerland) Darius Oskoui	WD	WD													0
Guest drivers ineligible for points
	(United Kingdom) George Russell					15	22							5	**1**	
	(Monaco) Charles Leclerc			26	30			5	2	2	2					
	(Russia) Matevos Isaakyan	27	15	16	7	8	7									
	(Switzerland) Louis Delétraz			Ret	16			24	7			16	18			
	(United Kingdom) Jake Hughes			Ret	22					24	12			Ret	8	
	(Brazil) Pietro Fittipaldi													Ret	14	
	(Brazil) Thiago Vivacqua			30	Ret									18	15	
	(United Kingdom) Raoul Owens			27	24			17	26							
	(Indonesia) Philo Paz Patric Armand			29	27							17	Ret			
	(Russia) Denis Korneev	22	Ret	Ret	29	19	18									
	(Switzerland) Hugo de Sadeleer											18	19			
	(Canada) Luke Chudleigh	20	20	19	19					20	21					
	(Russia) Danylo Pronenko					26	26							19	25	
	(Russia) Semen Evstigneev			Ret	36	23	20									
	(China) Ye Hongli											24	20	Ret	23	
	(Italy) Dario Capitanio			20	23											
	(Austria) Stefan Riener													Ret	21	
	(Sweden) Robin Hansson							26	22							
	(Ecuador) Julio Moreno			28	31			25	23							
	(Poland) Alex Bosak			24	35											
	(Malaysia) Akash Nandy			25	25											
	(United Kingdom) Ben Barnicoat													Ret	DNS	
Pos	Driver	ARA (Spain)		SPA (Belgium)		MSC (Russia)		NÜR (Germany)		HUN (Hungary)		LEC (France)		JER (Spain)		Points

Colour	Result
Gold	Winner
Silver	Second place
Bronze	Third place
Green	Points classification
Blue	Non-points classification
Blue	Non-classified finish (NC)
Purple	Retired, not classified (Ret)
Red	Did not qualify (DNQ)
Red	Did not pre-qualify (DNPQ)
Black	Disqualified (DSQ)
White	Did not start (DNS)
White	Withdrew (WD)
White	Race cancelled (C)
Blank	Did not practice (DNP)
Blank	Did not arrive (DNA)
Blank	Excluded (EX)

**Bold** – Pole
Italics – Fastest Lap

=== Teams' Championship ===
Pos	Driver	Car No.	ARA (Spain)		SPA (Belgium)		MSC (Russia)		NÜR (Germany)		HUN (Hungary)		LEC (France)		JER (Spain)		Points
1	(Finland) Koiranen GP	17	14	11	12	17	25	25	8	5	10	Ret	24	20	Ret	23	347
1	(Finland) Koiranen GP	18	8	16	10	12	13	14	6	3	6	3	14	4	Ret	21	347
1	(Finland) Koiranen GP	19	**1**	4	**2**	**3**	Ret	**2**	1	4	3	7	**1**	**1**	1	2	347
1	(Finland) Koiranen GP	58					15	22									347
1	(Finland) Koiranen GP	62													Ret	14	347
2	(Italy) Prema Powerteam	20	3	3	3	1	16	DNS	20	Ret	8	Ret	8	Ret	7	13	250
2	(Italy) Prema Powerteam	21	Ret	14	11	8	17	15	15	16	4	18	10	Ret	3	12	250
2	(Italy) Prema Powerteam	22	13	8	1	2	9	5	4	**1**	9	8	6	Ret	**DSQ**	7	250
2	(Italy) Prema Powerteam	53			24	35											250
3	(United Kingdom) Fortec Motorsports	7	7	Ret	Ret	11	3	4	29	14	12	5	Ret	10	Ret	6	151
3	(United Kingdom) Fortec Motorsports	8	19	27	17	20	Ret	12	3	6	18	1	21	12	2	3	151
3	(United Kingdom) Fortec Motorsports	9	Ret	17	14	26	22	19	12	8	16	Ret	11	Ret	15	Ret	151
3	(United Kingdom) Fortec Motorsports	51			26	30			5	2	2	2			Ret	DNS	151
3	(United Kingdom) Fortec Motorsports	52			30	Ret											151
4	(France) ART Junior Team	4	5	Ret	8	28	**1**	8	11	11	DSQ	14	4	2	9	17	148
4	(France) ART Junior Team	5	12	5	5	5	4	23	23	Ret	DSQ	19	19	11	12	19	148
4	(France) ART Junior Team	6	Ret	Ret	13	4	5	10	28	Ret	DSQ	20	23	16	16	20	148
5	(Germany) Josef Kaufmann Racing	14	6	10	32	21	14	17	14	12	5	4	9	7	Ret	4	137
5	(Germany) Josef Kaufmann Racing	15	15	2	7	14	7	1	10	Ret	13	11	7	6	Ret	10	137
5	(Germany) Josef Kaufmann Racing	16	23	12	23	Ret	12	11	22	Ret	23	13	15	Ret			137
5	(Germany) Josef Kaufmann Racing	50							24	7							137
6	(Netherlands) Manor MP Motorsport	10	Ret	**1**	15	10	2	6	7	10	**1**	9	5	8	13	22	132
6	(Netherlands) Manor MP Motorsport	11	11	13	Ret	13	21	16	13	17	19	10	13	5	8	9	132
6	(Netherlands) Manor MP Motorsport	49			28	31			25	23							132
7	(Belgium) KTR	23	4	9	4	37	11	3	**2**	13	7	6	3	13	4	5	121
7	(Belgium) KTR	24	17	21	22	32	24	21	16	20	15	17	Ret	14	14	18	121
7	(Belgium) KTR	25	25	26									22	15	10	11	121
8	(France) Tech 1 Racing	1	18	7	9	6	10	13	19	15	14	16	12	9	6	16	113
8	(France) Tech 1 Racing	2	21	23	34	34	20	24	Ret	21	21	15			6	1	113
8	(France) Tech 1 Racing	3	2	25	6	9	6	9	Ret	9	11	Ret	2	3	11	Ret	113
8	(France) Tech 1 Racing	44	20	20	19	19					20	21	18	19			113
8	(France) Tech 1 Racing	47			25	25											113
8	(France) Tech 1 Racing	48			29	27							17	Ret			113
9	(France) ARTA Engineering	26	24	22	31	Ret			27	25	22	22	21	17	17	24	10
9	(France) ARTA Engineering	27	WD	WD													10
9	(France) ARTA Engineering	28	9	6	18	15	18	Ret	21	18							10
10	(Austria) China BRT by JCS	35							9	19							4
10	(Austria) China BRT by JCS	36							18	24							4
11	(Spain) AVF	38	16	19	33	33							Ret	Ret			1
11	(Spain) AVF	39	26	24	Ret	16							16	18			1
11	(Spain) AVF	40	10	18	21	18											1
12	(United Kingdom) Strakka Racing	60									24	12			Ret	8	0
12	(United Kingdom) Strakka Racing	61									17	Ret					0
Guest teams ineligible for points
	(Italy) JD Motorsport	45	27	15	16	7	8	7									
	(Italy) JD Motorsport	46	22	Ret	Ret	29	19	18							18	15	
	(United Kingdom) Mark Burdett Motorsport	56			Ret	22											
	(United Kingdom) Mark Burdett Motorsport	57			27	24			17	26							
	(Italy) BVM Racing	54			20	23	26	26							19	25	
	(Italy) BVM Racing	55			Ret	36	23	20									
	(Sweden) Fragus BR Motorsport	59							26	22							
Pos	Driver	Car No.	ARA (Spain)		SPA (Belgium)		MSC (Russia)		NÜR (Germany)		HUN (Hungary)		LEC (France)		JER (Spain)		Points

Colour	Result
Gold	Winner
Silver	Second place
Bronze	Third place
Green	Points classification
Blue	Non-points classification
Blue	Non-classified finish (NC)
Purple	Retired, not classified (Ret)
Red	Did not qualify (DNQ)
Red	Did not pre-qualify (DNPQ)
Black	Disqualified (DSQ)
White	Did not start (DNS)
White	Withdrew (WD)
White	Race cancelled (C)
Blank	Did not practice (DNP)
Blank	Did not arrive (DNA)
Blank	Excluded (EX)

**Bold** – Pole
Italics – Fastest Lap
