= Matt Parry =

British racing driver (born 1994)

- Nationality: (United Kingdom) British
- Born: Matthew Simon Parry; 14 January 1994 (age 32) Cardiff, South Glamorgan, Wales

Blancpain GT Series Endurance Cup career
- Debut season: 2017
- Current team: GT SPORT MOTUL Team RJN
- Categorisation: FIA Gold
- Car number: 23
- Starts: 36
- Wins: 1
- Poles: 0
- Fastest laps: 0
- Best finish: 8th in 2015

Previous series
- 2013 2013 2012 2011: GP3 Series; Formula Renault 2.0 NEC; Formula Renault 2.0 Alps; InterSteps Championship; Formula Ford UK

Championship titles
- 2013 2012: Formula Renault 2.0 NEC; InterSteps Championship

Awards
- 2013: McLaren Autosport BRDC Award

Matthew Simon Parry (born 14 January 1994) is a British former racing driver.

== Career ==
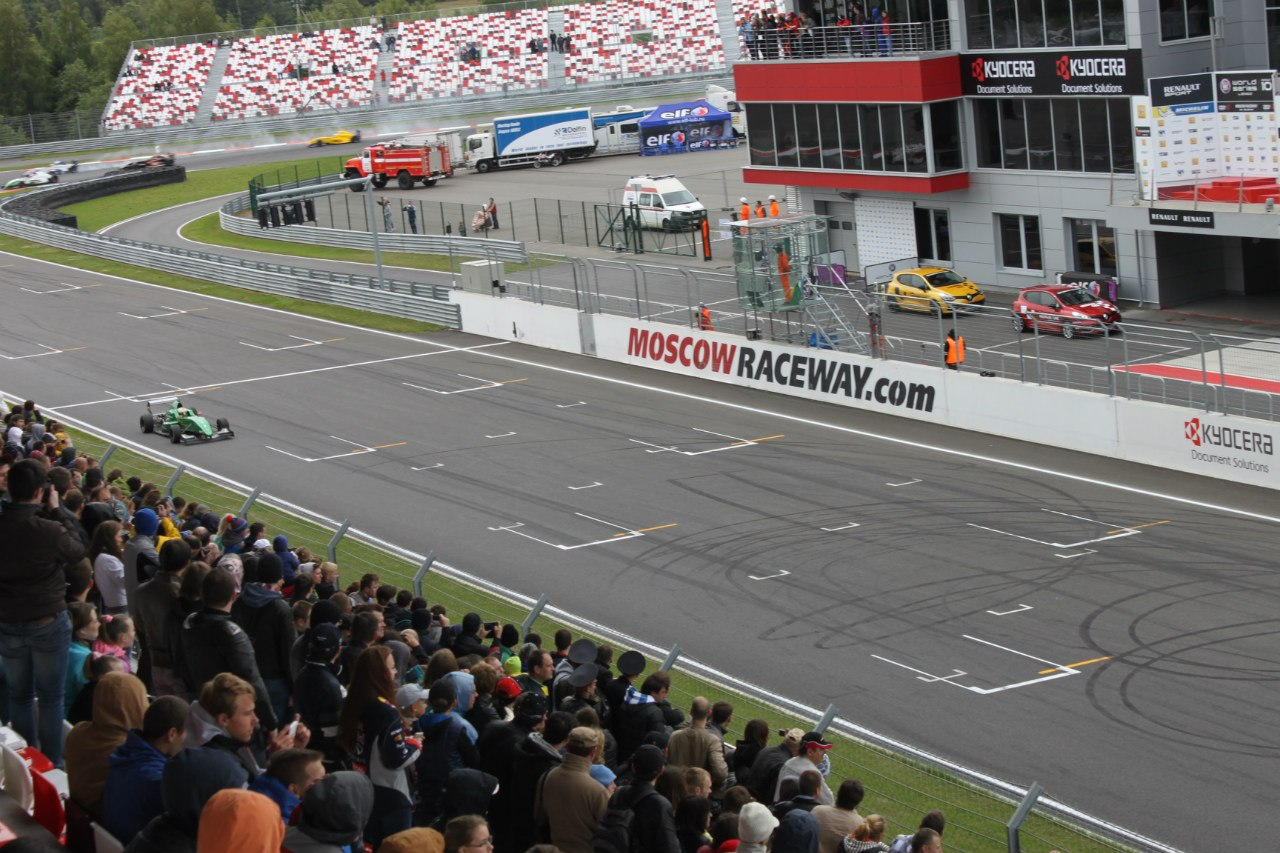
Parry during Race 1 of the 2014 Eurocup Formula Renault 2.0 season at Moscow Raceway.

=== Karting ===
Born in Cardiff, Parry entered karting in 2006, when he finished second in the Hoddesdon Kart Club Championship Minimax. His biggest success was in the last year of his karting career, winning the Super 1 National Rotax Max Junior championship in 2010.

=== Formula Ford & InterSteps ===
In 2011, Parry made his début in single-seaters, taking part in the British Formula Ford Championship with Fluid Motorsport. He finished eighth with eighteen point-scoring finishes in 24 races.

For 2012, Parry decided to switch to the InterSteps championship for Fortec Motorsports. He took thirteen wins and a total of 21 podiums in 23 races on his way to the championship title.

=== Formula Renault ===
Parry continued his collaboration with Fortec for the 2013 Formula Renault 2.0 NEC season. He won five races during the season to take the championship title, taking four further podium finishes. His performances earned him a nomination for the McLaren Autosport BRDC Award for the first time. On 1 December 2013, after the evaluation tests held at Silverstone, Parry was named as the winner of the award, taking the £100,000 cash prize and a Formula One test with McLaren.

In 2014, Parry continued racing in Formula Renault, this time competing in Formula Renault Eurocup. He again raced with Fortec Motorsports, with whom he competed for in 2012 and 2013. He continued to race as part of the Caterham Racing Academy, of which he has been part since 2011.

=== GP3 Series ===
In 2015, Parry made his GP3 debut with Koiranen GP alongside Jimmy Eriksson and Adderly Fong.

In July 2016, Parry won his first race at the Hungaroring in Hungary after starting from second place on the grid. He had a good weekend overall, topping Friday practice and almost being on pole until he was pipped by Nyck de Vries. In the second race the following morning, Parry crossed the line in sixth, later to finish fifth as fellow GP3 driver Jack Aitken got a five-second penalty for causing a collision with Parry's teammate Ralph Boschung.

== Racing record ==
=== Career summary ===
| Season | Series | Team | Races | Wins | Poles | FLaps | Podiums | Points | Position |
|---|---|---|---|---|---|---|---|---|---|
| 2011 | British Formula Ford Championship | Fluid Motorsport | 24 | 0 | 0 | 1 | 0 | 291 | 8th |
| 2011 | Formula Ford EuroCup | Fluid Motorsport | 11 | 0 | 0 | 0 | 0 | N/A | NC |
| 2011 | Formula Ford Festival | Fluid Motorsport | 1 | 0 | 0 | 0 | 0 | N/A | 9th |
| 2012 | InterSteps Championship | Fortec Motorsports | 23 | 13 | 13 | 10 | 21 | 649 | **1st** |
| 2013 | Formula Renault 2.0 NEC | Fortec Motorsports | 16 | 5 | 3 | 3 | 9 | 289 | **1st** |
| 2013 | Pau Formula Renault 2.0 Trophy | Fortec Motorsports | 1 | 0 | 1 | 0 | 0 | N/A | 5th |
| 2013 | Eurocup Formula Renault 2.0 | Fortec Motorsports | 2 | 0 | 0 | 0 | 0 | 0 | NC† |
| 2013 | Formula Renault 2.0 Alps | Koiranen GP | 2 | 0 | 0 | 0 | 1 | 0 | NC† |
| 2014 | Eurocup Formula Renault 2.0 | Fortec Motorsports | 14 | 0 | 0 | 0 | 1 | 59 | 11th |
| 2014 | Formula Renault 2.0 Alps | Fortec Motorsports | 6 | 0 | 0 | 0 | 1 | N/A | NC† |
| 2015 | GP3 Series | Koiranen GP | 18 | 0 | 0 | 0 | 3 | 67 | 8th |
| 2016 | GP3 Series | Koiranen GP | 18 | 1 | 0 | 0 | 2 | 82 | 9th |
| 2017 | Blancpain GT Series Endurance Cup | Motul Team RJN Motorsport | 5 | 0 | 0 | 0 | 0 | 0 | NC |
| 2017 | Intercontinental GT Challenge | Motul Team RJN Motorsport | 1 | 0 | 0 | 0 | 0 | 0 | NC |
| 2018 | Blancpain GT Series Endurance Cup | GT SPORT MOTUL Team RJN | 5 | 0 | 0 | 0 | 0 | 21 | 22nd |
| 2019 | Blancpain GT Series Endurance Cup | R-Motorsport | 5 | 0 | 0 | 0 | 0 | 1 | 34th |

^{†} As Parry was a guest driver, he was ineligible for points.

=== Complete Eurocup Formula Renault 2.0 results ===
(key) (Races in bold indicate pole position; races in italics indicate fastest lap)

| Year | Entrant | 1 | 2 | 3 | 4 | 5 | 6 | 7 | 8 | 9 | 10 | 11 | 12 | 13 | 14 | DC | Points |
|---|---|---|---|---|---|---|---|---|---|---|---|---|---|---|---|---|---|
| 2013 | Fortec Motorsports | ALC; 1 | ALC; 2 | SPA; 1 | SPA; 2 | MSC; 1 | MSC; 2 | RBR; 1 | RBR; 2 | HUN; 1 | HUN; 2 | LEC; 1; 15 | LEC; 2; 7 | CAT; 1 | CAT; 2 | NC† | 0 |
| 2014 | Fortec Motorsports | ALC; 1; 7 | ALC; 2 Ret | SPA; 1 Ret | SPA; 2; 11 | MSC; 1; 3 | MSC; 2; 4 | NÜR; 1; 29 | NÜR; 2; 14 | HUN; 1; 12 | HUN; 2; 5 | LEC; 1 Ret | LEC; 2; 10 | JER; 1 Ret | JER; 2; 6 | 11th | 57 |

† As Parry was a guest driver, he was ineligible for points

=== Complete Formula Renault 2.0 NEC results ===
(key) (Races in bold indicate pole position) (Races in italics indicate fastest lap)

| Year | Entrant | 1 | 2 | 3 | 4 | 5 | 6 | 7 | 8 | 9 | 10 | 11 | 12 | 13 | 14 | 15 | 16 | 17 | DC | Points |
|---|---|---|---|---|---|---|---|---|---|---|---|---|---|---|---|---|---|---|---|---|
| 2013 | Fortec Motorsports | **HOC**; **1**; 4 | **HOC**; **2**; 3 | HOC; 3; 3 | NÜR; 1; 1 | **NÜR**; **2**; 1 | SIL; 1; 1 | SIL; 2; 1 | SPA; 1; 2 | SPA; 2; 1 | ASS; 1; 4 | ASS; 2; 2 | MST; 1 Ret | MST; 2; 23 | MST; 3; 26 | ZAN; 1; 4 | ZAN; 2 Ret | ZAN; 3 C | 1st | 289 |

=== Complete Formula Renault 2.0 Alps Series results ===
(key) (Races in bold indicate pole position; races in italics indicate fastest lap)

| Year | Team | 1 | 2 | 3 | 4 | 5 | 6 | 7 | 8 | 9 | 10 | 11 | 12 | 13 | 14 | Pos | Points |
|---|---|---|---|---|---|---|---|---|---|---|---|---|---|---|---|---|---|
| 2013 | Koiranen GP | VLL; 1 | VLL; 2 | IMO1; 1 | IMO1; 2 | SPA; 1 | SPA; 2 | MNZ; 1 | MNZ; 2 | MIS; 1 | MIS; 2 | MUG; 1 | MUG; 2 | IMO2; 1; 3 | IMO2; 2; 15 | NC† | 0 |
| 2014 | Fortec Motorsports | IMO; 1; 9 | IMO; 2; 25 | PAU; 1 | PAU; 2 | RBR; 1 | RBR; 2 | SPA; 1 | SPA; 2 | MNZ; 1 | MNZ; 2 | MUG; 1; 11 | MUG; 2; 13 | JER; 1; 4 | JER; 2; 3 | NC† | 0 |

† As Parry was a guest driver, he was ineligible for points

=== Complete GP3 Series results ===
(key) (Races in bold indicate pole position) (Races in italics indicate fastest lap)

| Year | Entrant | 1 | 2 | 3 | 4 | 5 | 6 | 7 | 8 | 9 | 10 | 11 | 12 | 13 | 14 | 15 | 16 | 17 | 18 | Pos | Points |
|---|---|---|---|---|---|---|---|---|---|---|---|---|---|---|---|---|---|---|---|---|---|
| 2015 | Koiranen GP | CAT; FEA; 13 | CAT; SPR; 9 | RBR; FEA; 13 | RBR; SPR; 7 | SIL; FEA; 3 | SIL; SPR; 5 | HUN; FEA; 5 | HUN; SPR; 3 | SPA; FEA; Ret | SPA; SPR; Ret | MNZ; FEA; DSQ | MNZ; SPR; Ret | SOC; FEA; 7 | SOC; SPR; Ret | BHR; FEA; 11 | BHR; SPR; 3 | YMC; FEA; 6 | YMC; SPR; 24 | 8th | 67 |
| 2016 | Koiranen GP | CAT; FEA; 12 | CAT; SPR; 20 | RBR; FEA; 6 | RBR; SPR; 7 | SIL; FEA; 4 | SIL; SPR; 16 | HUN; FEA; 1 | HUN; SPR; 5 | HOC; FEA; 3 | HOC; SPR; 7 | SPA; FEA; Ret | SPA; SPR; Ret | MNZ; FEA; 9 | MNZ; SPR; 17 | SEP; FEA; 9 | SEP; SPR; 4 | YMC; FEA; Ret | YMC; SPR; 12 | 9th | 82 |

Sporting positions
| Preceded by Jake Dennis | Intersteps; Champion; 2012 | Succeeded by None (Series ended) |
| Preceded by Jake Dennis | Formula Renault 2.0 NEC; Champion; 2013 | Succeeded by Ben Barnicoat |
Awards
| Preceded by Jake Dennis | McLaren Autosport BRDC Award; 2013 | Succeeded by George Russell |
