= Matevos Isaakyan =

Russian racing driver (born 1998)

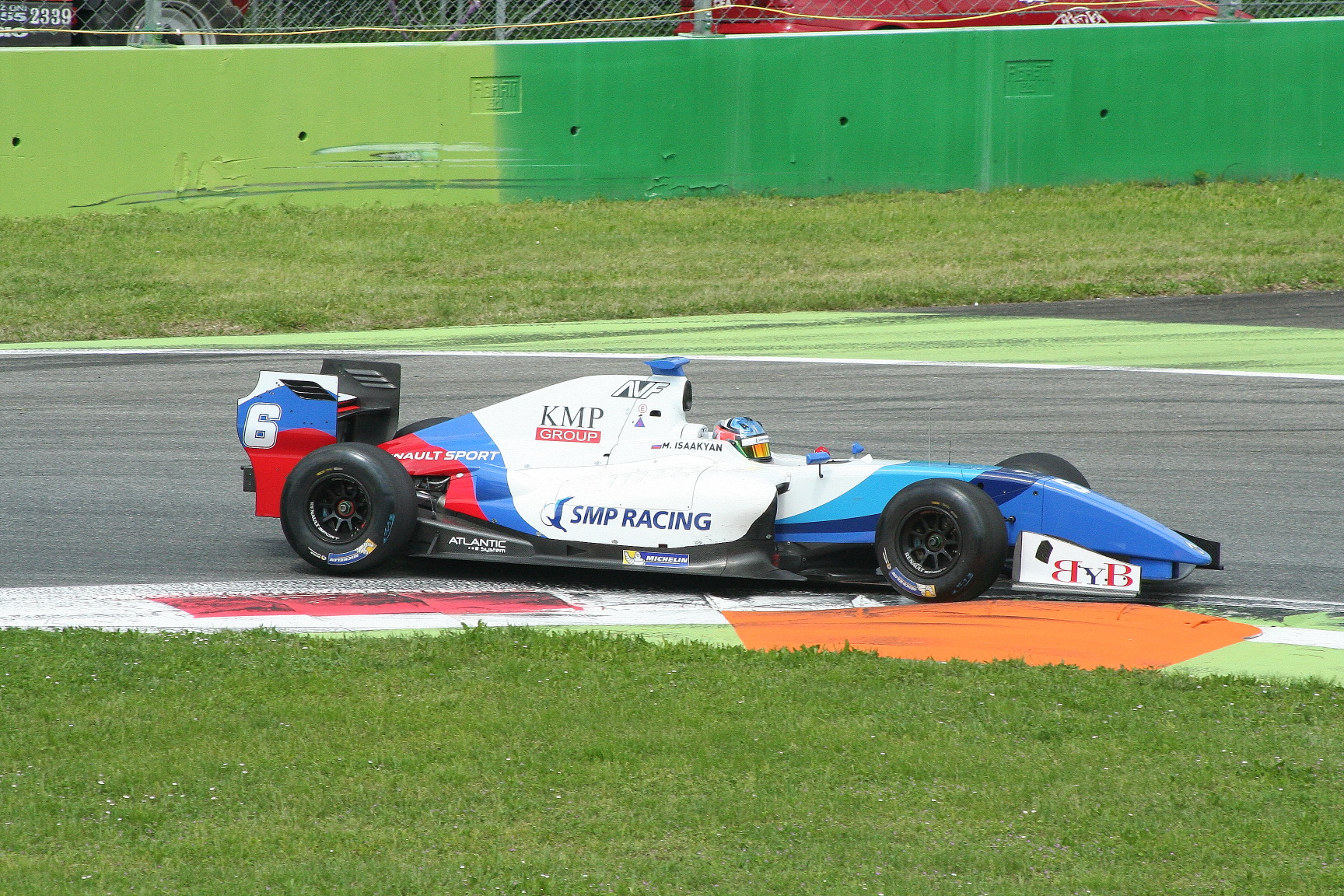
- Nationality: (Russia) Russian
- Born: 17 April 1998 (age 28) Moscow, Russia

Formula V8 3.5 career
- Debut season: 2016
- Current team: AVF
- Categorisation: FIA Silver (until 2017); FIA Gold (2018–)
- Car number: 35
- Former teams: SMP Racing
- Starts: 31
- Wins: 3
- Poles: 2
- Fastest laps: 4
- Best finish: 2nd in 2017

Previous series
- 2020 2019 2015-16 2014-15 2014-2015 2014 2013: European Le Mans Series; Formula 2 GP3 Series; Eurocup Formula Renault 2.0; Formula Renault 2.0 Alps; Toyota Racing Series; French F4 Championship

Matevos "Matos" Isaakyan (Russian: Матевос "Матос" Исаакян; born 17 April 1998) is a Russian former racing driver. He is a former member of the SMP Racing driver programme.

== Career ==
=== Karting ===
Born in Moscow, Isaakyan began karting in his native Russia in 2010, finishing fifth in the Russian Super Mini Championship. The following year, he stepped up to the Russian KF3 Championship, finishing seventh, before placing fifth in the same category in 2012.

=== French F4 ===
Isaakyan graduated to single-seaters in 2013, racing in the French F4 Championship. He took five podium places and two fastest laps on his way to fifth in the championship.

=== Toyota Racing Series ===
In January and February 2014, Isaakyan raced in the New Zealand-based Toyota Racing Series for the ETEC Motorsport team. He took a best race result of sixth at the opening round in Teretonga to finish ninth in the championship, one place behind teammate and fellow Russian Denis Korneev.

=== Formula Renault 2.0 ===
Isaakyan's main racing program for 2014 was in the Formula Renault 2.0 Alps championship, racing for Italian team JD Motorsport. He was ineligible to race at the first round of the season in Imola due to the fact he had not yet turned 16 years of age. He was, however, allowed to take part in the free practice sessions.

During the season, Isaakyan took seven podium places, including a double win at the Red Bull Ring, to finish third in the championship, behind Charles Leclerc and champion Nyck de Vries. He also finished second to Leclerc in the Junior Championship standings. Isaakyan also contested the opening three rounds of the 2014 Eurocup Formula Renault 2.0 season, taking a best race result of seventh at both Spa-Francorchamps and Moscow Raceway.

In 2015, Isaakyan remained with JD Motorsport to contest full-seasons in both Eurocup Formula Renault 2.0 and Formula Renault 2.0 Alps.

=== GP3 Series ===
Isaakyan made his debut with Koiranen GP at the Bahrain round of the 2015 season and finished twenty first with two points. The following year, Isaakyan competed with the team full-time and finished seventeenth overall (his highest race result being fourth in the sprint race at Spa-Francorchamps).

=== Formula V8 3.5 ===
Whilst competing full-time in GP3, Isaakyan debuted in the series with SMP Racing in place of original choice Vladimir Atoev. He claimed his maiden victory in the sport at the first race at Jerez and finished ninth overall.

=== Formula 2 ===
In 2019, Isaakyan entered the final two rounds of the FIA Formula 2 Championship for Charouz Racing System replacing injured Sauber Junior driver Juan Manuel Correa.

== Racing record ==
=== Career summary ===
| Season | Series | Team | Races | Wins | Poles | F/Laps | Podiums | Points | Position |
|---|---|---|---|---|---|---|---|---|---|
| 2013 | French F4 Championship | Auto Sport Academy | 20 | 0 | 0 | 2 | 5 | 153 | 5th |
| 2014 | Toyota Racing Series | ETEC Motorsport | 15 | 0 | 0 | 0 | 0 | 412 | 9th |
| 2014 | Formula Renault 2.0 Alps | JD Motorsport | 12 | 2 | 2 | 0 | 7 | 180 | **3rd** |
| 2014 | Eurocup Formula Renault 2.0 | JD Motorsport | 6 | 0 | 0 | 0 | 0 | 0 | NC† |
| 2015 | Formula Renault 2.0 Alps | JD Motorsport | 16 | 2 | 0 | 1 | 7 | 193 | 4th |
| 2015 | Eurocup Formula Renault 2.0 | JD Motorsport | 17 | 0 | 0 | 2 | 2 | 87 | 10th |
| 2015 | GP3 Series | Koiranen GP | 4 | 0 | 0 | 0 | 0 | 2 | 21st |
| 2016 | GP3 Series | Koiranen GP | 18 | 0 | 0 | 0 | 0 | 17 | 17th |
| 2016 | Formula V8 3.5 Series | SMP Racing | 13 | 1 | 1 | 0 | 2 | 70 | 9th |
| 2017 | World Series Formula V8 3.5 | SMP Racing with AVF | 18 | 2 | 1 | 3 | 8 | 215 | **2nd** |
| 2017 | European Le Mans Series | SMP Racing | 4 | 1 | 0 | 0 | 3 | 63 | 6th |
| 2017 | Russian Circuit Racing Series - Touring Light | SMP Racing | 2 | 0 | 0 | 0 | 0 | 24 | 14th |
| 2018 | European Le Mans Series | SMP Racing | 4 | 0 | 0 | 0 | 0 | 6 | 22nd |
| 2018 | 24 Hours of Le Mans | SMP Racing | 1 | 0 | 0 | 0 | 0 | N/A | DNF |
| 2018–19 | FIA World Endurance Championship | SMP Racing | 4 | 0 | 0 | 0 | 0 | 0 | NC |
| 2019 | FIA Formula 2 Championship | Sauber Junior Team by Charouz | 4 | 0 | 0 | 0 | 0 | 0 | 25th |
| 2020 | European Le Mans Series | Inter Europol Competition | 4 | 0 | 0 | 0 | 0 | 15.5 | 16th |
| 2022 | Russian Circuit Racing Series - CN | ArtLine Engineering | 2 | 1 | 0 | 1 | 1 | 49 | 28th |

^{†} As Isaakyan was a guest driver, he was ineligible for championship points.

=== Complete Eurocup Formula Renault 2.0 results ===
(key) (Races in bold indicate pole position; races in italics indicate fastest lap)

| Year | Entrant | 1 | 2 | 3 | 4 | 5 | 6 | 7 | 8 | 9 | 10 | 11 | 12 | 13 | 14 | 15 | 16 | 17 | DC | Points |
|---|---|---|---|---|---|---|---|---|---|---|---|---|---|---|---|---|---|---|---|---|
| 2014 | JD Motorsport | ALC; 1; 27 | ALC; 2; 15 | SPA; 1; 16 | SPA; 2; 7 | MSC; 1; 8 | MSC; 2; 7 | NÜR; 1 | NÜR; 2 | HUN; 1 | HUN; 2 | LEC; 1 | LEC; 2 | JER; 1 | JER; 2 | | | | NC† | 0 |
| 2015 | JD Motorsport | ALC; 1; 4 | ALC; 2; 4 | ALC; 3; 9 | SPA; 1; 6 | SPA; 2; 3 | HUN; 1; 19 | HUN; 2; 10 | SIL; 1; 16 | SIL; 2; 16 | SIL; 3; 14 | NÜR; 1; 3 | NÜR; 2; 12 | LMS; 1; 21 | LMS; 2 Ret | JER; 1; 6 | JER; 2; 6 | JER; 3; 7 | 10th | 87 |

† As Isaakyan was a guest driver, he was ineligible for points

=== Complete Formula Renault 2.0 Alps Series results ===
(key) (Races in bold indicate pole position; races in italics indicate fastest lap)

| Year | Team | 1 | 2 | 3 | 4 | 5 | 6 | 7 | 8 | 9 | 10 | 11 | 12 | 13 | 14 | 15 | 16 | Pos | Points |
|---|---|---|---|---|---|---|---|---|---|---|---|---|---|---|---|---|---|---|---|
| 2014 | JD Motorsport | IMO; 1 | IMO; 2 | PAU; 1; 2 | PAU; 2 Ret | **RBR**; **1**; 1 | **RBR**; **2**; 1 | SPA; 1; 2 | SPA; 2; 2 | MNZ; 1 Ret | MNZ; 2; 2 | MUG; 1; 7 | MUG; 2; 3 | JER; 1; 8 | JER; 2; 6 | | | 3rd | 180 |
| 2015 | JD Motorsport | IMO; 1; 8 | IMO; 2; 10 | PAU; 1; 2 | PAU; 2 Ret | RBR; 1; 2 | RBR; 2 Ret | RBR; 3; 1 | SPA; 1; 2 | SPA; 2; 1 | MNZ; 1; 8 | MNZ; 2; 6 | MNZ; 3 Ret | MIS; 1; 2 | MIS; 2; 2 | JER; 1 Ret | JER; 2; 12 | 4th | 193 |

=== Complete GP3 Series results ===
(key) (Races in bold indicate pole position) (Races in italics indicate fastest lap)

| Year | Entrant | 1 | 2 | 3 | 4 | 5 | 6 | 7 | 8 | 9 | 10 | 11 | 12 | 13 | 14 | 15 | 16 | 17 | 18 | Pos | Points |
|---|---|---|---|---|---|---|---|---|---|---|---|---|---|---|---|---|---|---|---|---|---|
| 2015 | Koiranen GP | CAT; FEA | CAT; SPR | RBR; FEA | RBR; SPR | SIL; FEA | SIL; SPR | HUN; FEA | HUN; SPR | SPA; FEA | SPA; SPR | MNZ; FEA | MNZ; SPR | SOC; FEA | SOC; SPR | BHR; FEA; Ret | BHR; SPR; 14 | YMC; FEA; 9 | YMC; SPR; 12 | 21st | 2 |
| 2016 | Koiranen GP | CAT; FEA; 11 | CAT; SPR; 6 | RBR; FEA; Ret | RBR; SPR; Ret | SIL; FEA; 21 | SIL; SPR; 18 | HUN; FEA; 12 | HUN; SPR; 8 | HOC; FEA; Ret | HOC; SPR; 13 | SPA; FEA; 8 | SPA; SPR; 4 | MNZ; FEA; Ret | MNZ; SPR; Ret | SEP; FEA; 15 | SEP; SPR; 14 | YMC; FEA; Ret | YMC; SPR; 16 | 17th | 17 |

=== Complete World Series Formula V8 3.5 results ===
(key) (Races in bold indicate pole position) (Races in italics indicate fastest lap)

| Year | Team | 1 | 2 | 3 | 4 | 5 | 6 | 7 | 8 | 9 | 10 | 11 | 12 | 13 | 14 | 15 | 16 | 17 | 18 | Pos. | Points |
|---|---|---|---|---|---|---|---|---|---|---|---|---|---|---|---|---|---|---|---|---|---|
| 2016 | SMP Racing | ALC; 1; 12 | ALC; 2; 10 | HUN; 1 Ret | HUN; 2 Ret | SPA; 1 DNS | SPA; 2 Ret | LEC; 1; 10 | LEC; 1; 12 | SIL; 1 | SIL; 2 | RBR; 1; 12 | **RBR**; **2**; 3 | MNZ; 1 | MNZ; 2 | JER; 1; 1 | JER; 2; 6 | CAT; 1; 5 | CAT; 2; 5 | 9th | 70 |
| 2017 | SMP Racing with AVF | SIL; 1; 4 | SIL; 2 Ret | SPA; 1 Ret | SPA; 2; 1 | MNZ; 1; 3 | MNZ; 2; 5 | JER; 1; 3 | JER; 2; 3 | ALC; 1; 2 | ALC; 2; 5 | NÜR; 1; 1 | NÜR; 2; 2 | MEX; 1; 2 | MEX; 2; 4 | COA; 1; 4 | COA; 2; 6 | **BHR**; **1** NC | BHR; 2; 9 | 2nd | 215 |

=== Complete European Le Mans Series results ===
| Year | Entrant | Class | Chassis | Engine | 1 | 2 | 3 | 4 | 5 | 6 | Rank | Points |
|---|---|---|---|---|---|---|---|---|---|---|---|---|
| 2017 | SMP Racing | LMP2 | Dallara P217 | Gibson GK428 4.2 L V8 | SIL | MNZ | RBR; 6 | LEC; 1 | SPA; 3 | ALG; 3 | 6th | 63 |
| 2018 | SMP Racing | LMP2 | Dallara P217 | Gibson GK428 4.2 L V8 | LEC; Ret | MNZ; Ret | RBR; 7 | SIL; Ret | SPA | ALG | 22nd | 6 |
| 2020 | Inter Europol Competition | LMP2 | Ligier JS P217 | Gibson GK428 4.2 L V8 | LEC; 7 | SPA; 11 | LEC; 6 | MNZ; 12 | ALG | | 16th | 15.5 |

=== Complete FIA World Endurance Championship results ===
| Year | Entrant | Class | Chassis | Engine | 1 | 2 | 3 | 4 | 5 | 6 | 7 | 8 | Rank | Points |
|---|---|---|---|---|---|---|---|---|---|---|---|---|---|---|
| 2018–19 | SMP Racing | LMP1 | BR Engineering BR1 | AER P60B 2.4 L Turbo V6 | SPA; Ret | LMS; Ret | SIL | FUJ; Ret | SHA; Ret | SEB | SPA | LMS | NC | 0 |

=== Complete 24 Hours of Le Mans results ===
| Year | Team | Co-Drivers | Car | Class | Laps | Pos. | Class Pos. |
|---|---|---|---|---|---|---|---|
| 2018 | (Russia) SMP Racing | (France) Stéphane Sarrazin (Russia) Egor Orudzhev | BR Engineering BR1-AER | LMP1 | 123 | DNF | DNF |
| 2020 | (Poland) Inter Europol Competition | (Poland) Jakub Śmiechowski (Austria) René Binder | Ligier JS P217-Gibson | LMP2 | 325 | 42nd | 17th |

=== Complete FIA Formula 2 Championship results ===
(key) (Races in bold indicate pole position) (Races in italics indicate points for the fastest lap of top ten finishers)

| Year | Entrant | 1 | 2 | 3 | 4 | 5 | 6 | 7 | 8 | 9 | 10 | 11 | 12 | 13 | 14 | 15 | 16 | 17 | 18 | 19 | 20 | 21 | 22 | 23 | 24 | DC | Points |
|---|---|---|---|---|---|---|---|---|---|---|---|---|---|---|---|---|---|---|---|---|---|---|---|---|---|---|---|
| 2019 | Sauber Junior Team by Charouz | BHR; FEA | BHR; SPR | BAK; FEA | BAK; SPR | CAT; FEA | CAT; SPR | MON; FEA | MON; SPR | LEC; FEA | LEC; SPR | RBR; SPR | RBR; SPR | SIL; FEA | SIL; SPR | HUN; FEA | HUN; SPR | SPA; FEA | SPA; SPR | MNZ; FEA | MNZ; SPR | SOC; FEA; 18 | SOC; SPR; 13 | YMC; FEA; 15 | YMC; SPR; Ret | 25th | 0 |

Sporting positions
| Preceded by Charles Leclerc | Formula Renault 2.0 Alps; Junior Champion; 2015 | Succeeded by None (Series ended) |
