= Hugo de Sadeleer =

Swiss racing driver

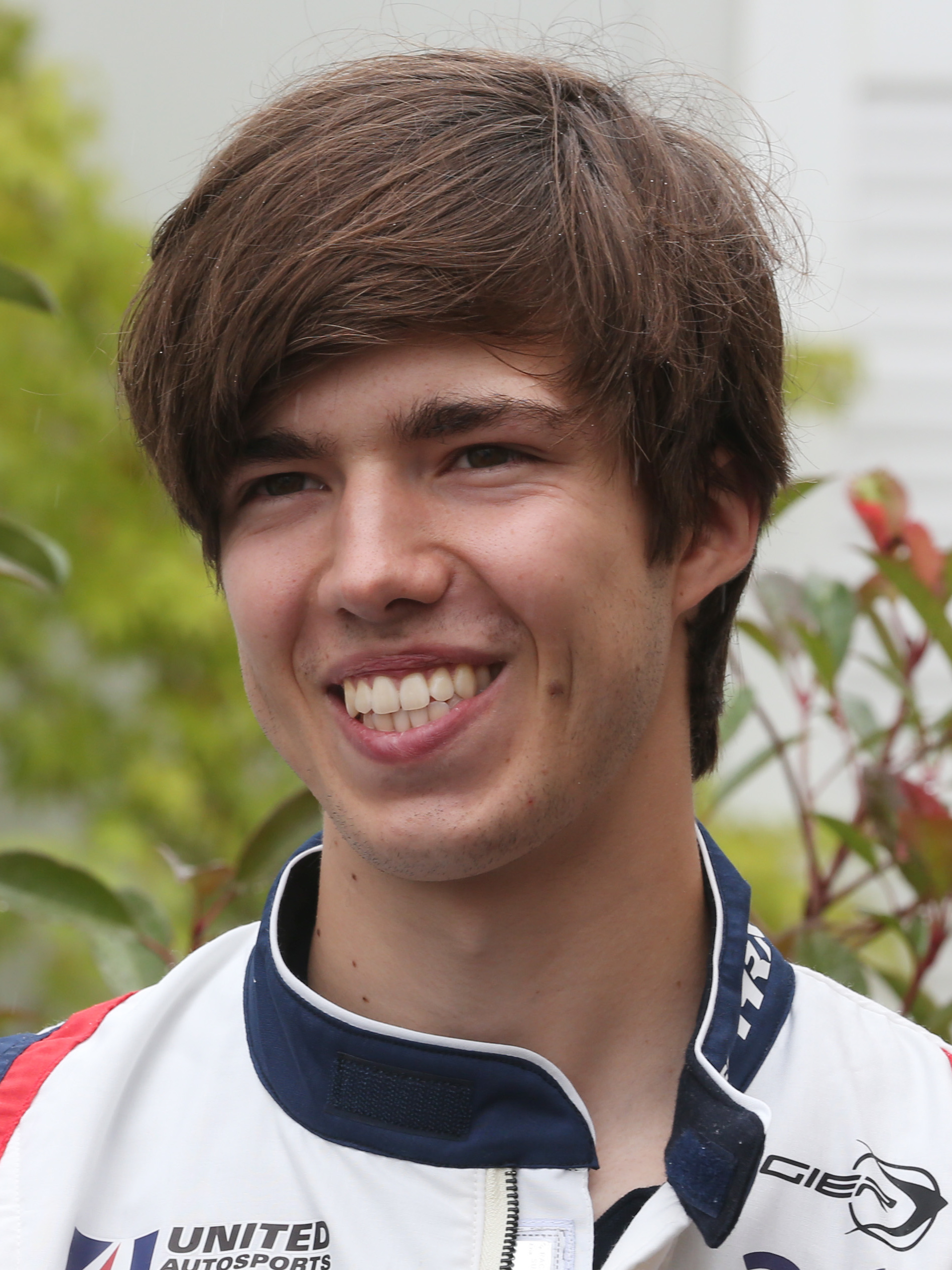
- Sadeleer in 2018
- Nationality: (Switzerland) Swiss
- Born: 16 July 1997 (age 29) Lausanne, Switzerland

European Le Mans Series career
- Debut season: 2017 European Le Mans Series
- Current team: United Autosports
- Categorisation: FIA Silver
- Car number: 32
- Starts: 6
- Wins: 2
- Podiums: 3
- Best finish: 2nd in 2017

Previous series
- 2016 2016 2015 2014 2012: Formula Renault 2.0 Eurocup; Formula Renault 2.0 NEC; Formula Renault 2.0 Alps; Formula Renault 2.0 Alps; Formula BMW

Hugo de Sadeleer (born 16 July 1997) is a professional racing driver from Switzerland, formerly competing in the LMP2 category of the European Le Mans Series.

== Career ==
=== Karting ===
Born in Lausanne, Sadeleer began karting in 2009 at the age of twelve. He finished 11th in the 2009 Swiss Rotax Max Challenge Mini.

=== Formula BMW ===
Sadeleer graduated to single-seaters in 2012, partaking in ten races of the 2012 Formula BMW Talent Cup finishing 8th in the overall standings.

=== Formula Renault 2.0 ===
In 2013, Sadeleer signed with Tech 1 racing to participate in the Formula Renault 2.0 Alps. Because of existing regulations that drivers must be over the age of 16, he was not allowed to participate in the championship and instead took part in testing. Sadeleer participated in the 2014 Formula Renault 2.0 Alps Series. He finished the season in 16th position with one podium finish at the Pau Grand Prix.

In 2015, Sadeleer graduated to the more competitive Formula Renault Eurocup championship. He participated in 17 races and finished the championship in 24th place.

In 2016, Sadeleer participated in the 2016 Eurocup Formula Renault 2.0 championship. He participated in 14 races, achieving one victory in Spa-Francorchamps and three podiums. He finished the season in sixth place.

=== Sportscars ===
On 12 January 2017, team owner Zak Brown announced Sadeleer would drive for United Autosports in the 2017 European Le Mans Series championship. He drove the team's new Ligier JSP217 in the LMP2 category. It was also announced that Sadeleer would participate in the 2017 24 Hours of Le Mans. He was joined in the cockpit by American driver Will Owen. The third driver was announced to be Filipe Albuquerque.

It was announced that Sadeleer would rejoin United Autosports for the 2018 European Le Mans Series and the 2018 24 Hours of Le Mans. For the ELMS campaign, he was joined in the cockpit by Will Owen and Wayne Boyd. The third driver for the 24 Hours of Le Mans was Juan Pablo Montoya.

== Racing record ==
=== Career summary ===
Season	Series	Team	Races	Wins	Poles	F/Laps	Podiums	Points	Position
2012	Formula BMW Talent Cup	BMW Motorsport	3	0	0	0	0	14	8th
2014	Formula Renault 2.0 Alps	Tech 1 Racing	14	0	0	0	1	27	16th
2014	Eurocup Formula Renault 2.0	Tech 1 Racing	2	0	0	0	0	0	NC†
2015	Formula Renault 2.0 Alps	Tech 1 Racing	4	0	0	0	0	0	NC†
2015	Eurocup Formula Renault 2.0	Tech 1 Racing	17	0	0	0	0	0	24th
2016	Formula Renault 2.0 North European Cup	Tech 1 Racing	15	0	0	2	0	162	9th
2016	Eurocup Formula Renault 2.0	Tech 1 Racing	14	1	0	0	3	89	6th
2017	European Le Mans Series - LMP2	United Autosports	6	2	0	0	3	98	**2nd**
2017	24 Hours of Le Mans - LMP2	United Autosports	1	0	0	0	0	N/A	4th
2017	Blancpain GT Series Endurance Cup	Team WRT	1	0	0	0	0	0	NC
2018	European Le Mans Series - LMP2	United Autosports	6	0	0	0	1	23	13th
2018	IMSA SportsCar Championship - Prototype	United Autosports	1	0	0	0	0	28	50th
2018	24 Hours of Le Mans - LMP2	United Autosports	1	0	0	0	1	N/A	**3rd**
2018-19	Asian Le Mans Series - LMP3	Jackie Chan DC Racing X Jota Sport	1	0	0	0	0	2	14th
2019	Blancpain GT World Challenge Europe	R-Motorsport	10	0	0	0	0	11.5	15th
2019	Blancpain GT Series Endurance Cup	R-Motorsport	1	0	0	0	0	0	NC
2019	ADAC GT Masters	PROpeak Performance	4	0	0	0	0	0	NC
2019	NASCAR Whelen Euro Series - Elite 2	Racing Engineering	4	0	0	0	2	214	21st
2023	GT4 European Series - Silver	Code Racing Development	8	0	0	0	1	17	27th
2025	Minutes Endurance Challenge - v.Granz Am	Linxas Racing Team	1	0	0	0	0	N/A†	NC‡

^{*} Season still ongoing.
^{†} As de Sadeleer was a guest driver, he was ineligible for points.

=== Complete Formula Renault 2.0 Alps Series results ===
(key) (Races in bold indicate pole position; races in italics indicate fastest lap)

Year	Team	1	2	3	4	5	6	7	8	9	10	11	12	13	14	15	16	Pos	Points
2014	Tech 1 Racing	IMO; 1; 18	IMO; 2 Ret	PAU; 1; 11	PAU; 2; 3	RBR; 1; 19	RBR; 2; 17	SPA; 1; 19	SPA; 2; 26	MNZ; 1 Ret	MNZ; 2 Ret	MUG; 1; 12	MUG; 2; 11	JER; 1; 21	JER; 2; 21			16th	27
2015	Tech 1 Racing	IMO; 1; 9	IMO; 2; 13	PAU; 1	PAU; 2	RBR; 1	RBR; 2	RBR; 3	SPA; 1	SPA; 2	MNZ; 1	MNZ; 2	MNZ; 3	MIS; 1	MIS; 2	JER; 1 Ret	JER; 2; 14	NC†	0

† As de Sadeleer was a guest driver, he was ineligible for points

=== Complete Eurocup Formula Renault 2.0 results ===
(key) (Races in bold indicate pole position; races in italics indicate fastest lap)

Year	Entrant	1	2	3	4	5	6	7	8	9	10	11	12	13	14	15	16	17	DC	Points
2014	Tech 1 Racing	ALC; 1	ALC; 2	SPA; 1	SPA; 2	MSC; 1	MSC; 2	NÜR; 1	NÜR; 2	HUN; 1	HUN; 2	LEC; 1; 18	LEC; 2; 19	JER; 1	JER; 2				NC†	0
2015	Tech 1 Racing	ALC; 1; 27†	ALC; 2; 16	ALC; 3; 21	SPA; 1 Ret	SPA; 2 Ret	HUN; 1; 13	HUN; 2 Ret	SIL; 1; 24	SIL; 2; 20	SIL; 3 Ret	NÜR; 1 Ret	NÜR; 2; 24	LMS; 1; 15	LMS; 2; 17	JER; 1; 17	JER; 2; 17	JER; 3; 13	24th	0
2016	Tech 1 Racing	ALC; 1 Ret	ALC; 2 DNS	ALC; 3; 18	MON; 1; 11	MNZ; 1; 10	MNZ; 2; 4	MNZ; 3; 13	RBR; 1; 6	RBR; 2; 11	LEC; 1 Ret	LEC; 2; 8	SPA; 1; 1	SPA; 2; 3	EST; 1; 2	EST; 2; 7			6th	89

† As de Sadeleer was a guest driver, he was ineligible for points

=== Complete Formula Renault 2.0 NEC results ===
(key) (Races in bold indicate pole position) (Races in italics indicate fastest lap)

Year	Entrant	1	2	3	4	5	6	7	8	9	10	11	12	13	14	15	DC	Points
2016	Tech 1 Racing	MNZ; 1; 10	MNZ; 2; 12	SIL; 1; 9	SIL; 2; 14	HUN; 1; 19	HUN; 2; 4	SPA; 1; 16	SPA; 2; 10	ASS; 1; 9	ASS; 2; 12	NÜR; 1; 8	NÜR; 2; 5	HOC; 1; 14	HOC; 2; 5	HOC; 3; 6	9th	162

=== Complete European Le Mans Series results ===
Year	Entrant	Class	Chassis	Engine	1	2	3	4	5	6	Rank	Points
2017	United Autosports	LMP2	Ligier JS P217	Gibson GK428 4.2 L V8	SIL; 1	MNZ; 6	RBR; 1	LEC; 5	SPA; 4	ALG; 2	2nd	98
2018	United Autosports	LMP2	Ligier JS P217	Gibson GK428 4.2 L V8	LEC; 9	MNZ; 11	RBR; 15	SIL; 10	SPA; 6	ALG; 3	10th	23

^{*} Season still in progress.

=== 24 Hours of Le Mans results ===
Year	Team	Co-Drivers	Car	Class	Laps	Pos.	Class Pos.
2017	(United States) United Autosports	(United States) Will Owen (Portugal) Filipe Albuquerque	Ligier JS P217-Gibson	LMP2	362	5th	4th
2018	(United States) United Autosports	(United States) Will Owen (Colombia) Juan Pablo Montoya	Ligier JS P217-Gibson	LMP2	365	7th	**3rd**

=== 24 Hours of Daytona results ===
Year	Team	Co-drivers	Car	Class	Laps	Pos.	Class Pos.
2018	(United States) United Autosports	(Brazil) Bruno Senna (United Kingdom) Paul di Resta (United States) Will Owen	Ligier JS P217-Gibson	P	804	4th	4th

=== Complete Blancpain GT World Challenge Europe results ===
(key) (Races in bold indicate pole position) (Races in italics indicate fastest lap)

Year	Team	Car	Class	1	2	3	4	5	6	7	8	9	10	Pos.	Points
2019	R-Motorsport	Aston Martin Vantage AMR GT3	Silver	BRH; 1 Ret	BRH; 2; 11	MIS; 1; 17	MIS; 2; 7	ZAN; 1; 6	ZAN; 2; 8	NÜR; 1; 15	NÜR; 2; 14	HUN; 1; 9	HUN; 2; 9	2nd	99
