= 2015 Formula Renault 2.0 Alps Series =

Motor racing competition

The 2015 Formula Renault 2.0 Alps Series was the fifth year of the Formula Renault 2.0 Alps series, and the fourteenth season of the former Swiss Formula Renault Championship. The championship began on 12 April at Imola and finished on 11 October at Jerez after sixteen races held at seven meetings. The 2015 season featured a new three-race weekend format for rounds at the Red Bull Ring and Monza.

In a final-race decider, British driver Jack Aitken secured the drivers' championship title by five points ahead of his Koiranen GP team-mate Jake Hughes. Aitken trailed Hughes by five points going into the race at Jerez, but Aitken's third-place finish – behind Ben Barnicoat and Anthoine Hubert, who were both ineligible to score championship points – to Hughes' ninth-place finish (third amongst Alps runners) gave him the honours. Aitken took four overall wins during the season, as well as taking three further class wins as the best Alps runner behind drivers ineligible for the drivers' championship. Hughes took three overall wins, adding a fourth class win at Pau. Third place in the championship was also settled in the final race, in favour of Thiago Vivacqua ahead of JD Motorsport team-mate Matevos Isaakyan. Vivacqua, a race-winner at Monza, prevailed by four points over Isaakyan, who took two overall wins and a further class win.

The only other championship-eligible driver to take a race victory was Vasily Romanov, who took a race victory at Monza for Cram Motorsport; he ultimately finished the season in sixth place in the championship. Two guest drivers took race victories during the season; Hubert won four races from six starts for Tech 1 Racing, while Barnicoat won the final race at Jerez for Fortec Motorsports. In the teams' championship, the performances of Aitken and Hughes saw Koiranen GP comfortably win the title, by almost 200 points ahead of JD Motorsport. In the junior championship for drivers under the age of 18, Isaakyan took eleven victories and finished 83 points clear of his nearest challenger, Philip Hamprecht.

== Drivers and teams ==
Team	No.	Driver name	Status	Rounds
(Finland) Koiranen GP	1	(Australia) Anton de Pasquale	G	3
(Finland) Koiranen GP	2	(United Kingdom) Jake Hughes		All
(Finland) Koiranen GP	3	(United Kingdom) Jack Aitken		All
(Finland) Koiranen GP	4	(Germany) Philip Hamprecht	J	1–6
(Finland) Koiranen GP	5	(Brazil) Bruno Baptista	J	All
(Finland) Koiranen GP	6	(Austria) Stefan Riener		1–6
(Finland) Koiranen GP	9	(Belgium) Max Defourny	G	2, 7
(Finland) Koiranen GP	29	(Russia) Nerses Isaakyan	G	6
(United Kingdom) Fortec Motorsports	6	(Austria) Stefan Riener		7
(United Kingdom) Fortec Motorsports	15	(Croatia) Martin Kodrić	G	1–2, 7
(United Kingdom) Fortec Motorsports	16	(United Kingdom) Ben Barnicoat	G	1–2, 7
(United Kingdom) Fortec Motorsports	23	(Canada) Zachary Claman DeMelo	G	2
(United Kingdom) Fortec Motorsports	46	(India) Jehan Daruvala	G	5–7
(United Kingdom) Fortec Motorsports	62	(Austria) Ferdinand Habsburg	G	5
(Italy) Cram Motorsport	7	(Italy) Matteo Ferrer		All
(Italy) Cram Motorsport	21	(Russia) Vasily Romanov		All
(Italy) Cram Motorsport	37	(India) Mahaveer Raghunathan	G	4
(Italy) Cram Motorsport	82	(United States) Travis Jordan Fischer		All
(Italy) GSK Grand Prix	8	(Russia) Denis Bulatov	J	1–6
(Italy) GSK Grand Prix	11	(Italy) Riccardo Cazzaniga	G	7
(Italy) GSK Grand Prix	12	(Italy) Andrea Russo	J	1
(Italy) GSK Grand Prix	14	(Russia) Nikita Troitskiy	G	7
(Italy) GSK Grand Prix	18	(Italy) Daniele Cazzaniga		All
(Italy) GSK Grand Prix	19	(Italy) Alessio Lorandi	G	4
(Italy) GSK Grand Prix	33	(France) Julien Falchero	G	6
(Italy) BVM Racing	10	(Ukraine) Danylo Pronenko		1, 3–7
(Italy) Technorace	13	(Italy) Alessandro Perullo		1, 3, 6
(France) Tech 1 Racing	20	(Switzerland) Hugo de Sadeleer	G	1, 7
(France) Tech 1 Racing	22	(France) Anthoine Hubert	G	1–2, 7
(France) Tech 1 Racing	31	(France) Simon Gachet	G	1–2, 7
(France) ARTA Engineering	25	(France) Amaury Richard	G	1, 3, 7
(France) ARTA Engineering	26	(Australia) James Allen		All
(France) ARTA Engineering	27	(France) Matthieu Vaxivière	G	2
(Italy) JD Motorsport	35	(Russia) Matevos Isaakyan	J	All
(Italy) JD Motorsport	36	(Brazil) Thiago Vivacqua		All
(Italy) JD Motorsport	37	(Russia) Aleksey Korneev	G	6–7
(Italy) Brixia Horse Power	39	(Italy) Andrea Baiguera	G	6

Icon	Status
J	Drivers that competed for the Juniors' Championship
G	Guest drivers ineligible to score points

== Race calendar and results ==
The seven-event calendar for the 2015 season was announced on 5 October 2014. As in 2014, only three rounds were held in Italy – at Monza, Imola and Misano. The Pau Grand Prix, Red Bull Ring, Spa-Francorchamps and Jerez were the remaining four rounds.

Round		Circuit	Date	Pole position	Fastest lap	Winning driver	Winning team	Junior winner
1	R1	(Italy) Autodromo Enzo e Dino Ferrari, Imola	11 April	(France) Anthoine Hubert	(France) Anthoine Hubert	(France) Anthoine Hubert	(France) Tech 1 Racing	(Russia) Matevos Isaakyan
1	R2	(Italy) Autodromo Enzo e Dino Ferrari, Imola	12 April	(United Kingdom) Jack Aitken	(France) Anthoine Hubert	(United Kingdom) Jack Aitken	(Finland) Koiranen GP	(Russia) Matevos Isaakyan
2	R1	(France) Pau Circuit, Pau	16 May	(France) Anthoine Hubert	(France) Simon Gachet	(France) Anthoine Hubert	(France) Tech 1 Racing	(Russia) Matevos Isaakyan
2	R2	(France) Pau Circuit, Pau	17 May	(France) Anthoine Hubert	(Croatia) Martin Kodrić	(France) Anthoine Hubert	(France) Tech 1 Racing	(Russia) Denis Bulatov
3	R1	(Austria) Red Bull Ring, Spielberg	23 May	(United Kingdom) Jack Aitken	(United Kingdom) Jack Aitken	(United Kingdom) Jack Aitken	(Finland) Koiranen GP	(Russia) Matevos Isaakyan
3	R2	(Austria) Red Bull Ring, Spielberg	24 May	(United Kingdom) Jack Aitken	(United Kingdom) Jack Aitken	(United Kingdom) Jack Aitken	(Finland) Koiranen GP	(Russia) Denis Bulatov
3	R3	(Austria) Red Bull Ring, Spielberg	24 May		(United Kingdom) Jack Aitken	(Russia) Matevos Isaakyan	(Italy) JD Motorsport	(Russia) Matevos Isaakyan
4	R1	(Belgium) Circuit de Spa-Francorchamps	6 June	(United Kingdom) Jake Hughes	(Russia) Vasily Romanov	(United Kingdom) Jake Hughes	(Finland) Koiranen GP	(Russia) Matevos Isaakyan
4	R2	(Belgium) Circuit de Spa-Francorchamps	7 June	(Brazil) Thiago Vivacqua	(United Kingdom) Jake Hughes	(Russia) Matevos Isaakyan	(Italy) JD Motorsport	(Russia) Matevos Isaakyan
5	R1	(Italy) Autodromo Nazionale Monza	4 July	(Russia) Vasily Romanov	(Russia) Matevos Isaakyan	(Brazil) Thiago Vivacqua	(Italy) JD Motorsport	(Russia) Denis Bulatov
5	R2	(Italy) Autodromo Nazionale Monza	5 July	(United Kingdom) Jake Hughes	(Russia) Vasily Romanov	(United Kingdom) Jake Hughes	(Finland) Koiranen GP	(Russia) Matevos Isaakyan
5	R3	(Italy) Autodromo Nazionale Monza	5 July		(Russia) Vasily Romanov	(Russia) Vasily Romanov	(Italy) Cram Motorsport	(Russia) Denis Bulatov
6	R1	(Italy) Misano World Circuit Marco Simoncelli	19 July	(India) Jehan Daruvala	(United Kingdom) Jake Hughes	(United Kingdom) Jack Aitken	(Finland) Koiranen GP	(Russia) Matevos Isaakyan
6	R2	(Italy) Misano World Circuit Marco Simoncelli	19 July	(India) Jehan Daruvala	(United Kingdom) Jake Hughes	(United Kingdom) Jake Hughes	(Finland) Koiranen GP	(Russia) Matevos Isaakyan
7	R1	(Spain) Circuito de Jerez	10 October	(France) Anthoine Hubert	(France) Anthoine Hubert	(France) Anthoine Hubert	(France) Tech 1 Racing	(Brazil) Bruno Baptista
7	R2	(Spain) Circuito de Jerez	11 October	(Croatia) Martin Kodrić	(United Kingdom) Ben Barnicoat	(United Kingdom) Ben Barnicoat	(United Kingdom) Fortec Motorsports	(Russia) Matevos Isaakyan

== Championship standings ==
Points system

Points were awarded to the top 10 classified finishers.

Position	**1st**	**2nd**	**3rd**	**4th**	**5th**	**6th**	**7th**	**8th**	**9th**	**10th**
Points	25	18	15	12	10	8	6	4	2	1

=== Drivers' championship ===
Pos	Driver	IMO (Italy)		PAU (France)		RBR (Austria)			SPA (Belgium)		MNZ (Italy)			MIS (Italy)		JER (Spain)		Pts
Pos	Driver	1	2	3	4	5	6	7	8	9	10	11	12	13	14	15	16	Pts
1	(United Kingdom) Jack Aitken	2	**1**	8	6	**1**	**1**	13	4	4	7	Ret	DNS	1	6	2	3	242
2	(United Kingdom) Jake Hughes	Ret	3	5	2	6	2	4	**1**	3	14	**1**	Ret	5	1	4	9	237
3	(Brazil) Thiago Vivacqua	7	Ret	7	12	4	3	7	3	**2**	1	2	Ret	7	3	8	6	197
4	(Russia) Matevos Isaakyan	8	10	2	Ret	2	Ret	1	2	1	8	6	Ret	2	2	Ret	12	193
5	(Austria) Stefan Riener	5	6	6	5	3	5	9	5	Ret	4	3	3	6	5	11	15	191
6	(Russia) Vasily Romanov	16†	7	Ret	11	Ret	11	2	12	5	**3**	5	1	4	7	5	Ret	138
7	(Ukraine) Danylo Pronenko	13	8			7	6	8	6	Ret	15	13	2	10	9	17	16	80
8	(United States) Travis Jordan Fischer	Ret	15	12	7	Ret	Ret	12	8	8	10	9	5	11	10	16	17	62
9	(Germany) Philip Hamprecht	10	11	14	9	9	13	Ret	7	6	9	10	7	12	Ret			59
10	(Italy) Matteo Ferrer	12	9	Ret	15	11	12	Ret	WD	WD	2	7	Ret	14	12	12	21	51
11	(Australia) James Allen	15	17†	16	Ret	5	9	11	11	Ret	13	12	4	16	14	13	13	48
12	(Russia) Denis Bulatov	Ret	Ret	Ret	8	10	7	Ret	10	11	5	Ret	6	13	8			46
13	(Brazil) Bruno Baptista	14	16†	Ret	14	Ret	8	6	9	9	Ret	Ret	Ret	15	Ret	19	19	31
14	(Italy) Daniele Cazzaniga	Ret	14	13	Ret	Ret	Ret	10	Ret	10	11	11	Ret	8	Ret	Ret	20	24
15	(Italy) Andrea Russo	11	Ret															8
16	(Italy) Alessandro Perullo	Ret	Ret			WD	WD	WD						17	11			1
Guest drivers ineligible for championship points
	(France) Anthoine Hubert	**1**	2	**1**	**1**											**1**	2	
	(United Kingdom) Ben Barnicoat	4	5	9	Ret											3	1	
	(France) Simon Gachet	3	Ret	3	4											9	7	
	(India) Jehan Daruvala										6	8	Ret	**3**	**4**	6	8	
	(France) Amaury Richard	Ret	12			8	10	3								15	22	
	(France) Matthieu Vaxivière			10	3													
	(Croatia) Martin Kodrić	6	4	4	13											7	**4**	
	(Australia) Anton de Pasquale					Ret	4	5										
	(Austria) Ferdinand Habsburg										12	4	Ret					
	(Belgium) Max Defourny			15	10											10	5	
	(Italy) Alessio Lorandi								Ret	7								
	(Russia) Aleksey Korneev													9	Ret	14	11	
	(Switzerland) Hugo de Sadeleer	9	13													Ret	14	
	(Russia) Nikita Troitskiy															18	10	
	(Canada) Zachary Claman DeMelo			11	Ret													
	(India) Mahaveer Raghunathan								Ret	12								
	(Russia) Nerses Isaakyan													18	13			
	(France) Julien Falchero													19	15			
	(Italy) Andrea Baiguera													20	16			
	(Italy) Riccardo Cazzaniga															20	18	
Pos	Driver	IMO (Italy)		PAU (France)		RBR (Austria)			SPA (Belgium)		MNZ (Italy)			MIS (Italy)		JER (Spain)		Pts

Colour	Result
Gold	Winner
Silver	Second place
Bronze	Third place
Green	Points classification
Blue	Non-points classification
Blue	Non-classified finish (NC)
Purple	Retired, not classified (Ret)
Red	Did not qualify (DNQ)
Red	Did not pre-qualify (DNPQ)
Black	Disqualified (DSQ)
White	Did not start (DNS)
White	Withdrew (WD)
White	Race cancelled (C)
Blank	Did not practice (DNP)
Blank	Did not arrive (DNA)
Blank	Excluded (EX)

**Bold** – Pole
Italics – Fastest Lap

=== Juniors' championship ===
Pos	Driver	IMO (Italy)		PAU (France)		RBR (Austria)			SPA (Belgium)		MNZ (Italy)			MIS (Italy)		JER (Spain)		Pts
1	(Russia) Matevos Isaakyan	8	10	2	Ret	2	Ret	1	2	1	8	6	Ret	2	2	Ret	12	293
2	(Germany) Philip Hamprecht	10	11	14	9	9	13	Ret	7	6	9	10	7	12	Ret			210
3	(Russia) Denis Bulatov	Ret	Ret	Ret	8	10	7	Ret	10	11	5	Ret	6	13	8			172
4	(Brazil) Bruno Baptista	14	16†	Ret	14	Ret	8	6	9	9	Ret	Ret	Ret	15	Ret	19	19	163
5	(Italy) Andrea Russo	11	Ret															15
Pos	Driver	IMO (Italy)		PAU (France)		RBR (Austria)			SPA (Belgium)		MNZ (Italy)			MIS (Italy)		JER (Spain)		Pts

=== Teams' championship ===
Prior to each round of the championship, two drivers from each team – if applicable – were nominated to score teams' championship points.

Pos	Team	Points
1	(Finland) Koiranen GP	574
2	(Italy) JD Motorsport	390
3	(Italy) Cram Motorsport	237
4	(Italy) BVM Racing	80
5	(Italy) GSK Grand Prix	78
6	(France) Arta Engineering	48
7	(United Kingdom) Fortec Motorsports	18
8	(Italy) Technorace	1
Guest teams ineligible for points
	(France) Tech 1 Racing	
	(Italy) Brixia Horse Power	
