= JD Motorsport =

Italian racing team

(Italy) JD Motorsport
- Founded: 24/11/1995
- Founder(s): Roberto Cavallari; Alfredo Cappelletti
- Base: Vespolate, Italy
- Team principal(s): Roberto Cavallari
- Former series: Formula Abarth; International Formula Master; Italian Formula 3 Formula Renault 2.0 Alps; Formula Renault 2.0 NEC; Eurocup Formula Renault 2.0; Formula Regional European Championship
- Teams' Championships: Eurocup Formula Renault 2.0: 2006; International Formula Master: 2008, 2009
- Drivers' Championships: Eurocup Formula Renault 2.0: 1996: Enrique Bernoldi; 1997: Jeffrey van Hooydonk; 1998: Bruno Besson; 1999: Gianmaria Bruni; Formula Renault Germany: 2001: Marcel Lasée; 2002: Christian Klien; International Formula Master: 2008: Chris van der Drift; Italian Formula Three Championship: 2012: Riccardo Agostini
- Website: http://jdmotorsport.net/

JD Motorsport was an auto racing team based in Vespolate, Italy that competed in formula single-seaters in Europe.

== History ==
The team was formed in 1995 by Roberto Cavallari and Alfredo Cappelletti. In 1996 the team started to participate in Formula Renault 2000 Eurocup and had four consecutive titles with Enrique Bernoldi, Jeffrey van Hooydonk, Bruno Besson and Gianmaria Bruni.

In 2000, the team expanded their campaign to the Italian Formula Renault Championship, but in 2001 decided to switch in the German Championship. Here the squad had two successive titles with Marcel Lasée and Christian Klien. In 2005, JD Motorsport returned to the Italian championship before joining Formula Renault 2.0 Northern European Cup in 2006.

In 2007, the team left Formula Renault category to compete in the International Formula Master. On the next year, the team sealed the drivers' title with Chris van der Drift and teams' titles in 2008 and 2009. But in 2010, International Formula Master was folded and the team joined new-for-2010 Formula Abarth category. In 2011, JD Motorsport expanded their operations into the Italian Formula Three Championship, winning the final season in the history of the championship with Riccardo Agostini.

In 2013, the team returned to Formula Renault 2.0 Northern European Cup and also had part-time campaign in the Formula Renault 2.0 Alps. But for 2014 it was decided to concentrate on the Alps series. The team with help from Matevos Isaakyan finished third in both the drivers' and teams' championship.

== Former series results ==
=== Formula Renault Eurocup ===
Formula Renault Eurocup
Year	Car	Drivers	Races	Wins	Poles	F/laps	Points	D.C.	T.C.
2005	Tatuus Renault 2000	(Brazil) Carlos Iaconelli	2	0	0	0	0†	40th†	9th
2005	Tatuus Renault 2000	(Italy) Marcello Puglisi	2	0	0	0	0	48th	9th
2005	Tatuus Renault 2000	(Netherlands) Xavier Maassen	16	0	0	0	32	10th	9th
2005	Tatuus Renault 2000	(Brazil) Allan Hellmeister	4	0	0	0	31†	11th†	9th
2006	Tatuus Renault 2000	(Denmark) Kasper Andersen	14	0	0	1	78	5th	1st
2006	Tatuus Renault 2000	(Australia) Chris van der Drift	14	2	1	1	91	2nd	1st
2006	Tatuus Renault 2000	(Netherlands) Xavier Maassen	14	0	0	0	21	13th	1st
2007-2013: "JD Motorsport" did not compete.
2014	Tatuus–Renault	(Russia) Matevos Isaakyan	6	0	0	0	0	NC	NC
2014	Tatuus–Renault	(Russia) Denis Korneev	0	0	0	0	0	NC	NC
2014	Tatuus–Renault	(Brazil) Thiago Vivacqua	2	0	0	0	0	NC	NC
2015	Tatuus–Renault	(Russia) Matevos Isaakyan	17	0	0	2	87	10th	7th
2015	Tatuus–Renault	(Brazil) Thiago Vivacqua	17	0	0	0	25	15th	7th
2015	Tatuus–Renault	(France) Amaury Bonduel	7	0	0	0	0	21st	7th
2015	Tatuus–Renault	(Russia) Nikita Troitskiy	4	0	0	0	0	NC	7th
2015	Tatuus–Renault	(Russia) Aleksey Korneev	3	0	0	0	0	NC	7th
2016	Tatuus–Renault	(Russia) Aleksey Korneev	15	0	0	0	22	15th	6th
2016	Tatuus–Renault	(Australia) James Allen	15	0	0	0	11	17th	6th
2016	Tatuus–Renault	(United Kingdom) Finlay Hutchison	4	0	0	0	0	NC	6th
2017	Tatuus–Renault	(China) Sun Yue Yang	23	0	0	0	0	31st	8th
2017	Tatuus–Renault	(France) Jean-Baptiste Simmenauer	23	0	0	0	0	27th	8th
2017	Tatuus–Renault	(Russia) Aleksandr Vartanyan	23	0	0	0	42	13th	8th
2018	Tatuus–Renault	(Italy) Lorenzo Colombo	20	0	2	0	152.5	6th	4th
2018	Tatuus–Renault	(Australia) Thomas Maxwell	20	0	0	0	76	10th	4th
2018	Tatuus–Renault	(Malaysia) Najiy Razak	20	0	0	0	0	28th	4th
2019	Tatuus F3 T-318-Renault	(Italy) Leonardo Lorandi	20	0	1	1	45.5	13th	4th
2019	Tatuus F3 T-318-Renault	(Belgium) Ugo de Wilde	20	1	0	0	81	7th	4th
2019	Tatuus F3 T-318-Renault	(Brazil) Joao Vieira	14	0	0	0	59	11th	4th
2020	Tatuus F3 T-318-Renault	(Spain) David Vidales	18	2	1	2	169	6th	5th
2020	Tatuus F3 T-318-Renault	(Finland) William Alatalo	20	0	1	0	92	8th	5th

† Includes points scored with other teams

=== Eurocup Formula Renault ===
Year	Car	Drivers	Races	Wins	Poles	F.L.	Podiums	Points	D.C.	T.C.
2001	Tatuus Renault 2000	(Germany) Marcel Lasée	3	0	0	0	1	52†	11th†	7th
2001	Tatuus Renault 2000	(Argentina) Christian Kissling	6	0	0	0	0	2	32nd	7th
2001	Tatuus Renault 2000	(Switzerland) Benjamin Leuenberger	9	0	0	0	1	36	16th	7th
2001	Tatuus Renault 2000	(France) Jean de Pourtales	1	0	0	0	0	0	74th	7th
2001	Tatuus Renault 2000	(Argentina) Mariano Acebal	1	0	0	0	0	0	44th	7th
2002	Tatuus Renault 2000	(Austria) Christian Klien	9	0	0	0	1	92	6th	4th
2002	Tatuus Renault 2000	(Denmark) Robert Schlünssen	9	0	0	0	0	26	12th	4th
2003	Tatuus Renault 2000	(Russia) Mikhail Aleshin	8	0	0	0	0	0	29th	1st
2003	Tatuus Renault 2000	(Denmark) Robert Schlünssen	8	1	1	1	3	88	2nd	1st
2003	Tatuus Renault 2000	(Austria) Reinhard Kofler	8	1	0	0	2	70	7th	1st
2004	Tatuus Renault 2000	(United States) Dominique Claessens	19	0	0	0	0	42	13th	5th
2004	Tatuus Renault 2000	(Austria) Reinhard Kofler	19	1	0	0	5	202	4th	5th
2004	Tatuus Renault 2000	(Brazil) Patrick Rocha	13	0	0	0	0	14	22nd	5th

† Includes points scored with other teams

=== Formula Regional European Championship ===
Year	Car	Drivers	Races	Wins	Poles	F/laps	Points	D.C.	T.C.
2021	Tatuus F3 T-318	(Russia) Michael Belov	2	0	0	1	116†	8th†	11th
2021	Tatuus F3 T-318	(Israel) Ido Cohen	8	0	0	0	0	27th	11th
2021	Tatuus F3 T-318	(Brazil) Eduardo Barrichello	19	0	0	0	0	29th	11th
2021	Tatuus F3 T-318	(Australia) Tommy Smith	19	0	0	0	0	31st	11th

† Includes points scored with other teams

== Timeline ==
Former series
Italian Formula Renault Championship	2000, 2005
Formula Renault Germany	2001–2004
International Formula Master	2007-2009
Formula Abarth	2010–2012
Italian Formula Three Championship	2011–2012
Formula Renault 2.0 Alps	2013–2015
Formula Renault 2.0 Northern European Cup	2006, 2013, 2016-2018
Formula Renault Eurocup	1996–2006, 2014–2020
Formula Regional European Championship	2021

Achievements
Preceded by SG Formula	Eurocup Formula Renault 2.0 Teams' Champion; 2006	Succeeded by Epsilon Euskadi
Preceded by Cram Motorsport	International Formula Master Teams' Champion; 2008-2009	Succeeded by none
