= 2016 Formula V8 3.5 Series =

Motor racing season

The 2016 Formula V8 3.5 Series was a multi-event motor racing championship for open wheel, formula racing cars held across Europe. The championship featured drivers competing in Formula V8 3.5 formula race cars that conformed to the technical regulations for the championship. The 2016 season was the first Formula V8 3.5 season organised independently by RPM Racing, after it was announced that Renault Sport would withdraw its backing of the championship at the end of the previous season.

The title was won by Tom Dillmann who took two race victories across the season such as championship runner-up Louis Delétraz, with the latter becoming the best rookie of the year. By winning the second race in Barcelona which turned out to be the title decider, Dillmann was able to overcome a six-point-deficit to Déletraz to leapfrog him in the championship by seven points, becoming the oldest series' world champion aged 27 years. Despite winning the most races of the season with five, Egor Orudzhev finished third in the standings due to inconsistent results as he faced several retirements. Fourth-placed driver Roy Nissany took three victories, including two wins at Silverstone. Matthieu Vaxivière, Aurélien Panis, Matevos Isaakyan and Johnny Cecotto Jr. were the remaining drivers to achieve at least one win throughout the year.

== Teams and drivers ==
Team	No.	Driver name	Status	Rounds
(United Kingdom) Fortec Motorsports	1	(Switzerland) Louis Delétraz	R	All
(United Kingdom) Fortec Motorsports	2	(Brazil) Pietro Fittipaldi	R	All
(Czech Republic) Lotus	3	(Austria) René Binder		All
(Czech Republic) Lotus	4	(Israel) Roy Nissany		All
(United Kingdom) Arden Motorsport	7	(Russia) Egor Orudzhev		All
(United Kingdom) Arden Motorsport	8	(France) Aurélien Panis		All
(Spain) AVF	15	(Mexico) Alfonso Celis Jr.		All
(Spain) AVF	16	(France) Tom Dillmann		All
(United Kingdom) Comtec Racing	17	(Australia) Thomas Randle	R	8–9
(Italy) Durango Racing Team	20	(Italy) Giuseppe Cipriani	R	All
(Italy) RP Motorsport	21	(Venezuela) Johnny Cecotto Jr.		1–3
(Italy) RP Motorsport	21	(Poland) Artur Janosz	R	4
(Italy) RP Motorsport	21	(Italy) Marco Bonanomi		6
(Italy) RP Motorsport	21	(United Kingdom) William Buller		7
(Italy) RP Motorsport	21	(United Kingdom) Jack Aitken	R	8–9
(Italy) RP Motorsport	22	(Brazil) Vitor Baptista	R	All
(Russia) SMP Racing	23	(France) Matthieu Vaxivière		All
(Russia) SMP Racing	24	(Russia) Matevos Isaakyan	R	1–4, 6, 8–9
(Spain) Teo Martín Motorsport	25	(Japan) Yu Kanamaru		All
(Spain) Teo Martín Motorsport	26	(Netherlands) Beitske Visser		All

Icon	Meaning
R	Series rookie for 2016

=== Driver changes ===
Changed teams

- Tom Dillmann switched from Jagonya Ayam with Carlin to AVF.
- Yu Kanamaru moved from Pons Racing to newcomers Teo Martín Motorsport.
- Roy Nissany made his switch from Tech 1 Racing to Lotus.
- Aurélien Panis moved from Tech 1 Racing to Arden Motorsport.
- Matthieu Vaxivière switched from Lotus to SMP Racing.
- Beitske Visser, who raced for AVF for two consecutive seasons was set to join Pons Racing, but following their withdrawal from the series, she signed with Teo Martín Motorsport.

Entering/Re–Entering Formula V8 3.5

- 2015 SMP F4 Championship runner-up Vladimir Atoev was set join the series with SMP Racing but due to health problems he was replaced by 2015 Eurocup Formula Renault 2.0 driver Matevos Isaakyan.
- 2015 Euroformula Open champion Vitor Baptista will join the series with RP Motorsport.
- After competing for Pons Racing at the Nürburgring in 2015, GP2 Series driver René Binder will join the series full-time with Lotus.
- Johnny Cecotto Jr., who raced at GP2 Series in 2015 moved to the series with RP Motorsport.
- Gentleman driver Giuseppe Cipriani joins the series with Durango Racing Team.
- After competing for Comtec Racing at the Red Bull Ring in 2015, Louis Delétraz, the 2015 Formula Renault 2.0 NEC champion, will enter the series full-time with Fortec Motorsports.
- Pietro Fittipaldi, who raced in the 2015 European Formula 3 Championship, will continue his collaboration with Fortec Motorsports into the series.

Leaving Formula V8 3.5

- Philo Paz Armand, Sean Gelael, Gustav Malja and Nicholas Latifi, who raced for Pons Racing, Jagonya Ayam with Carlin, Strakka Racing and Arden Motorsport respectively, will join the 2016 GP2 Series with Trident, Campos Racing, Rapax, and DAMS. 2015 Formula Renault 3.5 Series champion Oliver Rowland, who raced part-time in GP2 in 2015, will join the series full-time with MP Motorsport.
- Jazeman Jaafar, who finished eighth for Fortec Motorsports in 2015, will race in both the Blancpain Sprint Series and Blancpain Endurance Series with HTP Motorsport.
- Roberto Merhi, who contested a part-season with Pons Racing, will join the 2016 FIA World Endurance Championship with Manor in the LMP2 category.
- DAMS drivers Dean Stoneman and Nyck de Vries will leave the series to compete in the 2016 Indy Lights and 2016 GP3 Series with Andretti Autosport and ART Grand Prix respectively.
- Nikita Zlobin, who took part in the final two rounds of 2015 with Pons Racing, will join Euroformula Open with Teo Martín Motorsport.

Mid-season changes

- Prior to the round at Le Castellet, Johnny Cecotto Jr. was replaced by Artur Janosz at RP Motorsport.
- Prior to the round at the Red Bull Ring, Marco Bonanomi filled the seat left empty by Janosz at RP Motorsport.
- Bonanomi was replaced by William Buller at RP Motorsport at Monza.
- Buller was replaced by Jack Aitken at RP Motorsport at the final two rounds at Jerez and Barcelona.

=== Team changes ===
- After five seasons in the Formula Renault 3.5 Series (the 2005 season and from 2012 to 2015), DAMS will leave the championship to join the GP3 Series. The team's entry will be taken by International GT Open team Teo Martín Motorsport.
- Swiss team Spirit of Race will make its debut in 2016, taking the slot vacated by International Draco Racing. It was announced in February 2016 that the team would be operated by the SMP Racing concern under a Russian license.
- Euroformula Open team RP Motorsport will make their series debut in 2016.
- Carlin announced their withdrawal from the championship in March 2016 in order to concentrate on their GP2 Series activities.
- Durango Racing Team will make their series debut in 2016, replacing Tech 1 Racing.
- Pons Racing withdrew from the championship to focus on their Moto2 commitments.

== Race calendar ==
The provisional calendar for the 2016 season was announced on 17 October 2015, at the final round of the 2015 season. The championship returns to Paul Ricard, Monza and Barcelona. Rounds previously held at Monaco, Nürburgring and Le Mans Bugatti were removed from the schedule.

On 8 March 2016, it was announced that due to operational reasons, the final two rounds of the season would switch dates. The event at Jerez will become the penultimate round with the Circuit de Barcelona-Catalunya hosting the final round.

Round		Circuit	Date	Supporting
1	R1	(Spain) Ciudad del Motor de Aragón, Alcañiz	16 April	Eurocup Formula Renault 2.0; Renault Sport Trophy
1	R2	(Spain) Ciudad del Motor de Aragón, Alcañiz	17 April	Eurocup Formula Renault 2.0; Renault Sport Trophy
2	R1	(Hungary) Hungaroring, Mogyoród	23 April	World Touring Car Championship
2	R2	(Hungary) Hungaroring, Mogyoród	24 April	World Touring Car Championship
3	R1	(Belgium) Circuit de Spa-Francorchamps, Spa	21 May	International GT Open
3	R2	(Belgium) Circuit de Spa-Francorchamps, Spa	22 May	International GT Open
4	R1	(France) Circuit Paul Ricard, Le Castellet	25 June	Blancpain GT Series Endurance Cup
4	R2	(France) Circuit Paul Ricard, Le Castellet	26 June	Blancpain GT Series Endurance Cup
5	R1	(United Kingdom) Silverstone Circuit	23 July	International GT Open
5	R2	(United Kingdom) Silverstone Circuit	24 July	International GT Open
6	R1	(Austria) Red Bull Ring, Spielberg	10 September	International GT Open
6	R2	(Austria) Red Bull Ring, Spielberg	11 September	International GT Open
7	R1	(Italy) Autodromo Nazionale Monza	1 October	International GT Open
7	R2	(Italy) Autodromo Nazionale Monza	2 October	International GT Open
8	R1	(Spain) Circuito de Jerez, Jerez de la Frontera	29 October	Euroformula Open
8	R2	(Spain) Circuito de Jerez, Jerez de la Frontera	30 October	Euroformula Open
9	R1	(Spain) Circuit de Barcelona-Catalunya, Barcelona	5 November	International GT Open
9	R2	(Spain) Circuit de Barcelona-Catalunya, Barcelona	6 November	International GT Open

== Results ==
Round		Circuit	Pole position	Fastest lap	Winning driver	Winning team	Rookie winner
1	R1	(Spain) Ciudad del Motor de Aragón	(Russia) Egor Orudzhev	(Switzerland) Louis Delétraz	(Switzerland) Louis Delétraz	(United Kingdom) Fortec Motorsports	(Switzerland) Louis Delétraz
1	R2	(Spain) Ciudad del Motor de Aragón	(France) Tom Dillmann	(Switzerland) Louis Delétraz	(France) Aurélien Panis	(United Kingdom) Arden Motorsport	(Switzerland) Louis Delétraz
2	R1	(Hungary) Hungaroring	(France) Tom Dillmann	(France) Tom Dillmann	(Venezuela) Johnny Cecotto Jr.	(Italy) RP Motorsport	(Switzerland) Louis Delétraz
2	R2	(Hungary) Hungaroring	(France) Tom Dillmann	(Israel) Roy Nissany	(France) Tom Dillmann	(Spain) AVF	(Switzerland) Louis Delétraz
3	R1	(Belgium) Circuit de Spa-Francorchamps	(France) Aurélien Panis	(Russia) Egor Orudzhev	(Russia) Egor Orudzhev	(United Kingdom) Arden Motorsport	(Switzerland) Louis Delétraz
3	R2	(Belgium) Circuit de Spa-Francorchamps	(France) Tom Dillmann	(France) Tom Dillmann	(France) Matthieu Vaxivière	(Russia) SMP Racing	(Brazil) Vitor Baptista
4	R1	(France) Circuit Paul Ricard	(France) Matthieu Vaxivière	(Russia) Egor Orudzhev	(Russia) Egor Orudzhev	(United Kingdom) Arden Motorsport	(Switzerland) Louis Delétraz
4	R2	(France) Circuit Paul Ricard	(Israel) Roy Nissany	(Switzerland) Louis Delétraz	(Switzerland) Louis Delétraz	(United Kingdom) Fortec Motorsports	(Switzerland) Louis Delétraz
5	R1	(United Kingdom) Silverstone Circuit	(France) Matthieu Vaxivière	(Israel) Roy Nissany	(Israel) Roy Nissany	(Czech Republic) Lotus	(Brazil) Pietro Fittipaldi
5	R2	(United Kingdom) Silverstone Circuit	(France) Matthieu Vaxivière	(Israel) Roy Nissany	(Israel) Roy Nissany	(Czech Republic) Lotus	(Switzerland) Louis Delétraz
6	R1	(Austria) Red Bull Ring	(Switzerland) Louis Delétraz	(France) Matthieu Vaxivière	(France) Matthieu Vaxivière	(Russia) SMP Racing	(Switzerland) Louis Delétraz
6	R2	(Austria) Red Bull Ring	(Russia) Matevos Isaakyan	(France) Matthieu Vaxivière	(France) Aurélien Panis	(United Kingdom) Arden Motorsport	(Russia) Matevos Isaakyan
7	R1	(Italy) Autodromo Nazionale Monza	(Israel) Roy Nissany	(Israel) Roy Nissany	(Israel) Roy Nissany	(Czech Republic) Lotus	(Switzerland) Louis Delétraz
7	R2	(Italy) Autodromo Nazionale Monza	(Israel) Roy Nissany	(Israel) Roy Nissany	(Russia) Egor Orudzhev	(United Kingdom) Arden Motorsport	(Switzerland) Louis Delétraz
8	R1	(Spain) Circuito de Jerez	(United Kingdom) Jack Aitken	(France) Matthieu Vaxivière	(Russia) Matevos Isaakyan	(Russia) SMP Racing	(Russia) Matevos Isaakyan
8	R2	(Spain) Circuito de Jerez	(Switzerland) Louis Delétraz	(Switzerland) Louis Delétraz	(Russia) Egor Orudzhev	(United Kingdom) Arden Motorsport	(Switzerland) Louis Delétraz
9	R1	(Spain) Circuit de Barcelona-Catalunya	(France) Tom Dillmann	(Switzerland) Louis Delétraz	(Russia) Egor Orudzhev	(United Kingdom) Arden Motorsport	(Switzerland) Louis Delétraz
9	R2	(Spain) Circuit de Barcelona-Catalunya	(Switzerland) Louis Delétraz	(Russia) Egor Orudzhev	(France) Tom Dillmann	(Spain) AVF	(Brazil) Pietro Fittipaldi

== Championship standings ==
Points system

Points were awarded to the top 10 classified finishers.

Position	**1st**	**2nd**	**3rd**	**4th**	**5th**	**6th**	**7th**	**8th**	**9th**	**10th**
Points	25	18	15	12	10	8	6	4	2	1

=== Drivers' Championship ===
Pos	Driver	ARA (Spain)		HUN (Hungary)		SPA (Belgium)		LEC (France)		SIL (United Kingdom)		RBR (Austria)		MNZ (Italy)		JER (Spain)		CAT (Spain)		Points
1	(France) Tom Dillmann	3	**2**	**2**	**1**	2	**2**	4	6	4	4	3	2	12	8	Ret	8	**3**	1	237
2	(Switzerland) Louis Delétraz	1	5	3	4	3	Ret	6	1	10	6	**2**	4	2	3	12	**2**	2	**4**	230
3	(Russia) Egor Orudzhev	**Ret**	14†	Ret	9	1	Ret	1	3	Ret	3	Ret	5	7	1	2	1	1	7	193
4	(Israel) Roy Nissany	7	7	6	2	Ret	Ret	2	**2**	1	1	6	13	**1**	**6**	8	14	9	2	189
5	(France) Aurélien Panis	5	1	4	3	**8**	5	8	4	5	5	5	1	4	Ret	4	Ret	4	12	183
6	(France) Matthieu Vaxivière	2	Ret	5	5	Ret	1	**5**	Ret	**2**	**7**	1	6	3	Ret	3	3	Ret	Ret	175
7	(Austria) René Binder	4	3	11	7	5	6	3	5	3	2	Ret	12	5	2	5	7	Ret	6	161
8	(Japan) Yu Kanamaru	Ret	4	9	10	4	7	7	11	7	9	7	Ret	6	5	6	10	8	10	85
9	(Russia) Matevos Isaakyan	12	10	Ret	Ret	DNS	Ret	10	12			12	**3**			1	6	5	5	70
10	(Brazil) Pietro Fittipaldi	11	9	8	8	11†	10†	Ret	7	6	Ret	11	11	11	4	9	12	7	3	60
11	(Mexico) Alfonso Celis Jr.	6	8	Ret	Ret	10	3	11	8	Ret	11	4	7	9	10	Ret	9	Ret	13	55
12	(Brazil) Vitor Baptista	8	11	10	Ret	6	4	Ret	Ret	8	8	10	8	8	Ret	10	11	6	Ret	51
13	(Netherlands) Beitske Visser	10	12	7	DNS	7	9†	9	10	9	10	8	9	14	9	7	5	10	8	50
14	(Venezuela) Johnny Cecotto Jr.	9	6	1	6	12†	Ret													43
15	(United Kingdom) Jack Aitken															**DSQ**	4	11	9	14
16	(United Kingdom) William Buller													10	7					7
17	(Italy) Giuseppe Cipriani	13	13	Ret	Ret	9	8	13	13	11	12	13	Ret	13	11	Ret	15	12	14	6
18	(Italy) Marco Bonanomi											9	10							3
19	(Poland) Artur Janosz							12	9											2
20	(Australia) Thomas Randle															Ret	13	Ret	11	0
Pos	Driver	ARA (Spain)		HUN (Hungary)		SPA (Belgium)		LEC (France)		SIL (United Kingdom)		RBR (Austria)		MNZ (Italy)		JER (Spain)		CAT (Spain)		Points

Colour	Result
Gold	Winner
Silver	Second place
Bronze	Third place
Green	Points classification
Blue	Non-points classification
Blue	Non-classified finish (NC)
Purple	Retired, not classified (Ret)
Red	Did not qualify (DNQ)
Red	Did not pre-qualify (DNPQ)
Black	Disqualified (DSQ)
White	Did not start (DNS)
White	Withdrew (WD)
White	Race cancelled (C)
Blank	Did not practice (DNP)
Blank	Did not arrive (DNA)
Blank	Excluded (EX)

**Bold** – Pole
Italics – Fastest Lap
† – Retired, but classified

=== Teams' Championship ===
Pos	Team	Car No.	ARA (Spain)		HUN (Hungary)		SPA (Belgium)		LEC (France)		SIL (United Kingdom)		RBR (Austria)		MNZ (Italy)		JER (Spain)		CAT (Spain)		Points
1	(United Kingdom) Arden Motorsport	7	**Ret**	14†	Ret	9	1	Ret	1	3	Ret	3	Ret	5	7	1	2	1	1	7	380
1	(United Kingdom) Arden Motorsport	8	5	1	4	3	8	5	8	4	5	5	5	1	4	Ret	4	Ret	4	12	380
2	(Czech Republic) Lotus	3	4	3	11	7	5	6	3	5	3	2	12	Ret	5	2	5	7	Ret	6	348
2	(Czech Republic) Lotus	4	7	7	6	2	Ret	Ret	2	**2**	1	1	6	13	**1**	**6**	8	14	9	2	348
3	(Spain) AVF	15	6	8	Ret	Ret	9	3	11	8	Ret	11	4	7	9	10	Ret	9	Ret	13	292
3	(Spain) AVF	16	3	**2**	**2**	**1**	2	**2**	4	6	4	4	3	2	12	8	Ret	8	**3**	1	292
4	(United Kingdom) Fortec Motorsports	1	1	5	3	4	3	Ret	6	1	10	6	**2**	4	2	3	11	**2**	2	**4**	290
4	(United Kingdom) Fortec Motorsports	2	11	9	8	8	11†	10†	Ret	7	6	Ret	11	11	11	4	9	12	7	3	290
5	(Russia) SMP Racing	23	2	Ret	5	5	Ret	1	**5**	Ret	**2**	**7**	1	6	3	Ret	3	3	Ret	Ret	245
5	(Russia) SMP Racing	24	12	10	Ret	Ret	DNS	Ret	10	12			12	3			1	6	5	5	245
6	(Spain) Teo Martín Motorsport	25	Ret	4	9	10	4	7	7	11	7	9	7	Ret	6	5	6	10	8	10	135
6	(Spain) Teo Martín Motorsport	26	10	12	7	DNS	7	9†	9	10	9	10	8	9	14	9	7	5	10	8	135
7	(Italy) RP Motorsport	21	9	6	1	6	12†	Ret	12	9			9	10	10	7	**DSQ**	4	11	9	120
7	(Italy) RP Motorsport	22	8	11	10	Ret	6	4	Ret	Ret	8	8	10	8	8	Ret	10	11	6	Ret	120
8	(Italy) Durango Racing Team	20	13	13	Ret	Ret	9	8	13	13	11	12	13	Ret	13	11	Ret	15	12	14	6
9	(United Kingdom) Comtec Racing	17															Ret	13	Ret	11	0
Pos	Team	Car No.	ARA (Spain)		HUN (Hungary)		SPA (Belgium)		LEC (France)		SIL (United Kingdom)		RBR (Austria)		MNZ (Italy)		JER (Spain)		CAT (Spain)		Points

Colour	Result
Gold	Winner
Silver	Second place
Bronze	Third place
Green	Points classification
Blue	Non-points classification
Blue	Non-classified finish (NC)
Purple	Retired, not classified (Ret)
Red	Did not qualify (DNQ)
Red	Did not pre-qualify (DNPQ)
Black	Disqualified (DSQ)
White	Did not start (DNS)
White	Withdrew (WD)
White	Race cancelled (C)
Blank	Did not practice (DNP)
Blank	Did not arrive (DNA)
Blank	Excluded (EX)

**Bold** – Pole
Italics – Fastest Lap
† – Retired, but classified
