= Nikita Troitskiy =

Russian driver (born 1999)

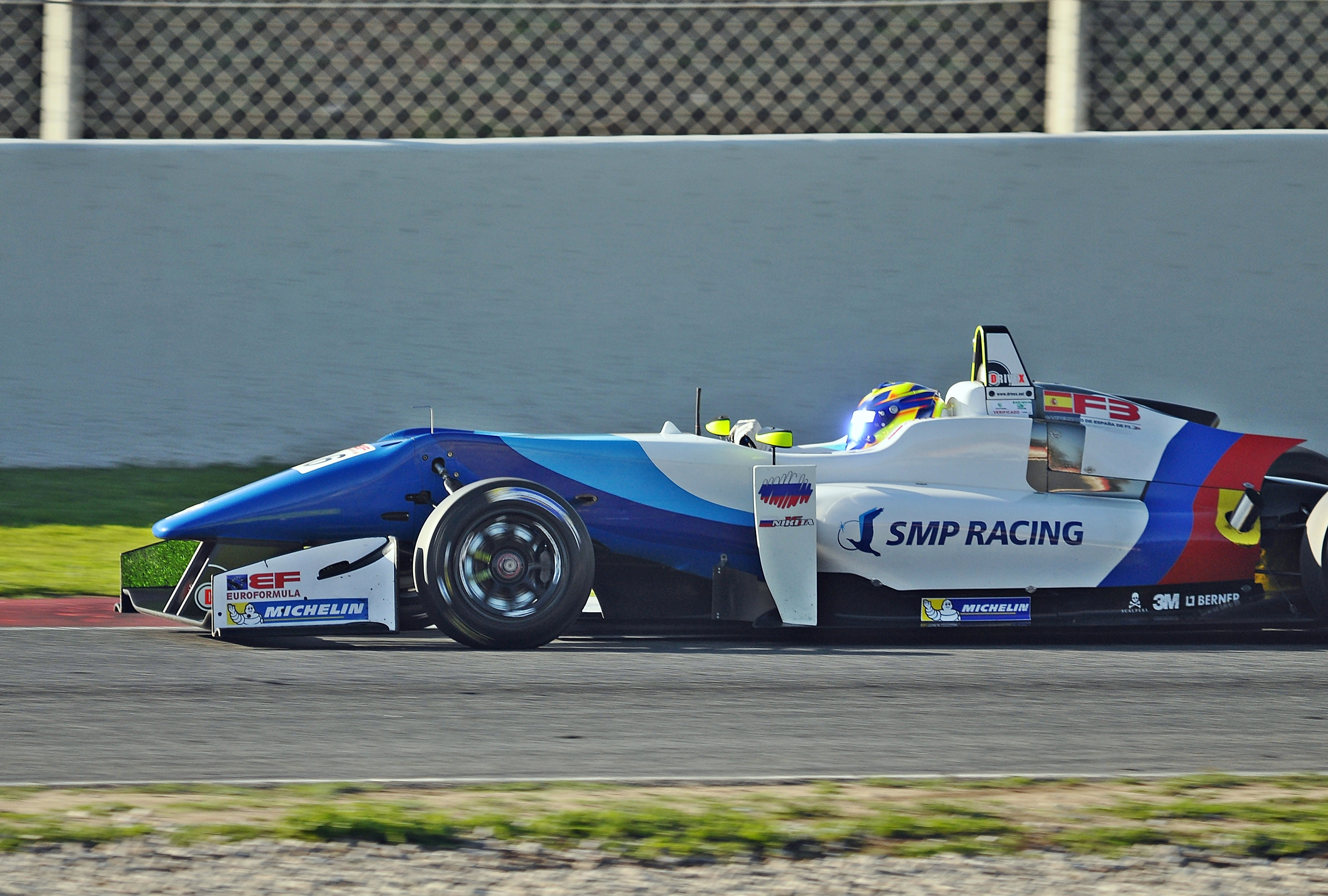
- Nationality: (Russia) Russian
- Born: 16 April 1999 (age 27) Ekenäs, Finland

FIA Formula 3 European Championship career
- Debut season: 2018
- Current team: Carlin
- Car number: 16
- Starts: 29
- Wins: 1
- Poles: 0
- Fastest laps: 2
- Best finish: 15th in 2018

Previous series
- 2016–17 2016 2015–16 2015 2015: Euroformula Open Championship; Formula Renault 2.0 NEC; MRF Challenge; SMP F4 Championship; French F4 Championship

Nikita Troitskiy (Russian: Никита Троицкий; born 16 April 1999) is a Russian former racing driver.

== Career ==
=== Karting ===
Born in Ekenäs, Finland, but raised in St. Petersburg, Troitskiy competed in karting for a number of years after some encouragement from fellow countryman Robert Shwartzman.

=== Lower formulae ===
In 2015, Troitskiy graduated to single-seaters in the SMP F4 and French F4 Championships. He claimed a win and finished sixth in the former whilst finishing thirteenth in the latter.

Later that month, Troitskiy partook in the MRF Challenge and finished third overall.

=== Formula Renault 2.0 NEC ===
In 2016, Troitskiy switched to the sport with Fortec Motorsports. He finished thirteenth overall, with a podium in his first race.

=== Euroformula Open ===
Troitskiy also raced in two rounds of the Euroformula Open Championship with Drivex, claiming a pole and third place in the second race at Monza.

The following year, Troitskiy reunited with Drivex to contest the series. He wasn't able to win, but finished as runner-up to Harrison Scott with nine podium finishes in the eighteen races. In the final race of the season, Felipe Drugovich won the race, but was ineligible to score points and Nikita Troitskiy win the last race.

== Racing record ==
=== Career summary ===
Season	Series	Team	Races	Wins	Poles	F/Laps	Podiums	Points	Position
2015	SMP F4 Championship	Koiranen GP	18	1	0	1	5	149	6th
2015	French F4 Championship	Auto Sport Academy	9	0	0	0	3	70	13th
2015	Eurocup Formula Renault 2.0	JD Motorsport	4	0	0	0	0	0	NC†
2015	Formula Renault 2.0 Alps Series	GSK Grand Prix	2	0	0	0	0	0	NC†
2015–16	MRF Challenge Formula 2000	MRF Racing	14	2	0	0	8	191	**3rd**
2016	Formula Renault 2.0 NEC	Fortec Motorsports	12	0	0	0	1	116	14th
2016	Eurocup Formula Renault 2.0	Fortec Motorsports	12	0	0	0	0	0	NC†
2016	Euroformula Open Championship	Drivex School	4	0	1	0	1	36	13th
2017	Euroformula Open Championship	Drivex School	16	0	2	4	9	222	**2nd**
2017	Spanish Formula 3 Championship	Drivex School	6	0	1	1	4	0	NC†
2018	FIA Formula 3 European Championship	Carlin	29	1	0	2	1	37	15th

^{†} As Troitskiy was a guest driver, he was ineligible for championship points.

=== Complete SMP F4 Championship results ===
(key) (Races in bold indicate pole position; races in italics indicate fastest lap)

Year	1	2	3	4	5	6	7	8	9	10	11	12	13	14	15	16	17	18	19	20	21	DC	Points
2015	AHV; 1 Ret	AHV; 2; 6	AHV; 3; 1	MSC; 1 Ret	MSC; 2; 6	MSC; 3; 5	SOC; 1 DNS	SOC; 2; 6	SOC; 3; 2	ALA; 1; 8	ALA; 2 Ret	ALA; 3; 12	AUD; 1	AUD; 2	AUD; 3	MSC; 1; 5	MSC; 2; 3	MSC; 3; 3	AUD; 1; 10	AUD; 2; 4	AUD; 3; 9	6th	149

=== Complete French F4 Championship results ===
(key) (Races in bold indicate pole position; races in italics indicate fastest lap)

Year	1	2	3	4	5	6	7	8	9	10	11	12	13	14	15	16	17	18	19	20	21	DC	Points
2015	LÉD; 1; 14	LÉD; 2; 8	LÉD; 3; 19†	LMS; 1; 6	LMS; 2; 2	LMS; 3; 2	PAU; 1	PAU; 2	PAU; 3	HUN; 1; 2	HUN; 2 Ret	HUN; 3; 8	MAG; 1	MAG; 2	MAG; 3	NAV; 1	NAV; 2	NAV; 3	LEC; 1	LEC; 2	LEC; 3	13th	70

=== Complete Eurocup Formula Renault 2.0 results ===
(key) (Races in bold indicate pole position; races in italics indicate fastest lap)

Year	Team	1	2	3	4	5	6	7	8	9	10	11	12	13	14	15	16	17	DC	Points
2015	JD Motorsport	ALC; 1	ALC; 2	ALC; 3	SPA; 1	SPA; 2	HUN; 1	HUN; 2	SIL; 1	SIL; 2	SIL; 3	NÜR; 1; 21	NÜR; 2; 31	LMS; 1; 17	LMS; 2 NC	JER; 1	JER; 2	JER; 3	NC†	0
2016	Fortec Motorsports	ALC; 1; 8	ALC; 2 Ret	ALC; 3; 5	MON; 1	MNZ; 1; 22	MNZ; 2; 5	MNZ; 3 Ret	RBR; 1	RBR; 2	LEC; 1 Ret	LEC; 2; 17	SPA; 1; 8	SPA; 2; 6	EST; 1; 11	EST; 2; 16			NC†	0

† As Troitskiy was a guest driver, he was ineligible for points

=== Complete Formula Renault 2.0 Alps Series results ===
(key) (Races in bold indicate pole position; races in italics indicate fastest lap)

Year	Team	1	2	3	4	5	6	7	8	9	10	11	12	13	14	15	16	Pos	Points
2015	GSK Grand Prix	IMO; 1	IMO; 2	PAU; 1	PAU; 2	RBR; 1	RBR; 2	RBR; 3	SPA; 1	SPA; 2	MNZ; 1	MNZ; 2	MNZ; 3	MIS; 1	MIS; 2	JER; 1; 18	JER; 2; 10	NC†	0

† As Troitskiy was a guest driver, he was ineligible for points

=== Complete MRF Challenge Formula 2000 Championship results ===
(key) (Races in bold indicate pole position) (Races in italics indicate fastest lap)

Year	1	2	3	4	5	6	7	8	9	10	11	12	13	14	DC	Points
2015–16	ABU; 1; 4	ABU; 2; 1	ABU; 3; 6	ABU; 4; 6	BHR; 1; 2	BHR; 2; 3	DUB; 1; 3	DUB; 2; 2	DUB; 3; 2	DUB; 4 DSQ	CHE; 1; 8	CHE; 2; 1	CHE; 3; 3	CHE; 4; 5	3rd	191

=== Complete Formula Renault 2.0 NEC results ===
(key) (Races in bold indicate pole position) (Races in italics indicate fastest lap)

Year	Entrant	1	2	3	4	5	6	7	8	9	10	11	12	13	14	15	DC	Points
2016	Fortec Motorsports	MNZ; 1; 2	MNZ; 2; 6	SIL; 1; 14	SIL; 2; 11	HUN; 1; 14	HUN; 2; 13	SPA; 1; 17	SPA; 2; 13	ASS; 1; 10	ASS; 2; 10	NÜR; 1; 18	NÜR; 2; 13	HOC; 1	HOC; 2	HOC; 3	14th	116

=== Complete Euroformula Open Championship results ===
(key) (Races in bold indicate pole position; races in italics indicate points for the fastest lap of top ten finishers)

Year	Entrant	1	2	3	4	5	6	7	8	9	10	11	12	13	14	15	16	DC	Points
2016	Drivex School	EST; 1	EST; 2	SPA; 1	SPA; 2	LEC; 1	LEC; 2	SIL; 1	SIL; 2	RBR; 1; 7	RBR; 2; 4	MNZ; 1; 10	**MNZ**; **2**; 3	JER; 1	JER; 2	CAT; 1	CAT; 2	13th	36
2017	Drivex School	EST; 1 Ret	**EST**; **2**; 2	SPA; 1; 4	**SPA**; **2**; 6	LEC; 1; 2	LEC; 2; 2	HUN; 1; 3	HUN; 2; 2	SIL; 1; 5	SIL; 2; 5	MNZ; 1; 2	MNZ; 2; 6	JER; 1; 3	JER; 2; 2	**CAT**; **1**; 4	CAT; 2; 2	2nd	222

=== Complete FIA Formula 3 European Championship results ===
(key) (Races in bold indicate pole position) (Races in italics indicate fastest lap)

Year	Entrant	Engine	1	2	3	4	5	6	7	8	9	10	11	12	13	14	15	16	17	18	19	20	21	22	23	24	25	26	27	28	29	30	DC	Points
2018	Carlin	Volkswagen	PAU; 1; 15	PAU; 2; 13	PAU; 3; 11	HUN; 1; 11	HUN; 2; 20	HUN; 3; 9	NOR; 1; 22	NOR; 2; 11	NOR; 3 Ret	ZAN; 1; 11	ZAN; 2; 13	ZAN; 3; 1	SPA; 1 DNS	SPA; 2; 8	SPA; 3; 24	SIL; 1; 14	SIL; 2 Ret	SIL; 3; 15	MIS; 1; 18	MIS; 2; 21	MIS; 3; 14	NÜR; 1; 13	NÜR; 2; 17	NÜR; 3; 19	RBR; 1; 16	RBR; 2 Ret	RBR; 3; 17	HOC; 1; 8	HOC; 2; 9	HOC; 3; 21	15th	37
