= 2016 Euroformula Open Championship =

Multi-event motor racing championship

The 2016 Euroformula Open Championship was a multi-event motor racing championship for single-seat open wheel formula racing cars that held across Europe. The championship featured drivers competing in two-litre Formula Three racing cars built by Italian constructor Dallara which conform to the technical regulations, or formula, for the championship. It was the third Euroformula Open Championship season.

== Teams and drivers ==
- All cars were powered by Toyota engines.

Team	No.	Driver	Status	Rounds
(Italy) RP Motorsport	1	(Poland) Antoni Ptak Jr.		NC, All
(Italy) RP Motorsport	2	(Thailand) Kantadhee Kusiri		NC, All
(Italy) RP Motorsport	3	(Italy) Damiano Fioravanti		All
(Italy) RP Motorsport	3	(United Kingdom) Jack Aitken		NC
(Italy) RP Motorsport	4	(United Kingdom) Jack Aitken		1–2
(Italy) RP Motorsport	4	(United Kingdom) Enaam Ahmed	R	3–4, 6
(Italy) RP Motorsport	4	(Colombia) Tatiana Calderón		5, 7–8
(Italy) RP Motorsport	5	(Italy) Damiano Fioravanti		NC
(Italy) RP Motorsport	5	(Thailand) Tanart Sathienthirakul		All
(Italy) RP Motorsport	37	(Poland) Igor Waliłko		NC
(Spain) Campos Racing	6	(Ecuador) Julio Moreno		NC, All
(Spain) Campos Racing	7	(Mexico) Diego Menchaca		NC, All
(Spain) Campos Racing	8	(Italy) Leonardo Pulcini		NC, All
(Spain) Campos Racing	9	(Azerbaijan) Gülhüseyn Abdullayev	R	NC, All
(Spain) Teo Martín Motorsport	10	(Colombia) Tatiana Calderón		NC, 1–2
(Spain) Teo Martín Motorsport	11	(Romania) Petru Florescu	R	NC, 1–2
(Spain) Teo Martín Motorsport	12	(Russia) Nikita Zlobin		NC
(Spain) Teo Martín Motorsport	12	(Russia) Vladimir Atoev		3–5
(Spain) Teo Martín Motorsport	14	(Mexico) José Manuel Vilalta		NC, 1–3
(Spain) Teo Martín Motorsport	45	(United Kingdom) Harrison Scott	R G	7
(Spain) Teo Martín Motorsport	45	(France) Dorian Boccolacci	G	8
(Spain) Teo Martín Motorsport	71	(Spain) Xavier Lloveras	G	8
(Spain) Teo Martín Motorsport	72	(Russia) Nikita Zlobin		All
(United Kingdom) Team West-Tec	15	(China) Liang Jiatong	R	NC, 2–3
(Italy) DAV Racing	18	(Italy) Daniele Cazzaniga	R	1–2, 4, 6
(Italy) DAV Racing	18	(Italy) Riccardo Cazzaniga	R	3, 5
(Italy) DAV Racing	27	(China) Ling Kang		NC, 1–3
(Italy) DAV Racing	65	(United Kingdom) Enaam Ahmed	R	2
(Italy) DAV Racing	65	(Italy) Riccardo Cazzaniga	R	6
(Italy) DAV Racing	77	(Italy) Riccardo Cazzaniga	R	NC
(Italy) BVM Racing	20	(Russia) Daniil Pronenko	R	NC, 1–3, 5–8
(Italy) BVM Racing	21	(China) Ye Hongli	R	1, 4, 6–7
(Spain) Drivex School	21	(United States) Nicholas Loro Silva	R	NC
(Spain) Drivex School	62	(Austria) Ferdinand Habsburg	R	NC, All
(Spain) Drivex School	91	(Russia) Nikita Troitskiy	R	5–6
(Spain) Drivex School	91	(Russia) Vasily Romanov	R G	7–8
(United Kingdom) Fortec Motorsports	28	(United Kingdom) Sam MacLeod		6
(United Kingdom) Fortec Motorsports	37	(Poland) Igor Waliłko		1–4
(United Kingdom) Carlin Motorsport	47	(Germany) Keyvan Andres Soori	R	NC, All
(United Kingdom) Carlin Motorsport	51	(India) Ameya Vaidyanathan	R	NC, All
(United Kingdom) Carlin Motorsport	98	(United States) Colton Herta	R	All

Icon	Legend
R	Rookie Trophy

== Race calendar ==
An eight-round provisional calendar was revealed on 12 November 2015. All rounds will support the International GT Open (excepting Jerez) and Formula V8 3.5 (excepting Estoril and Le Castellet) series. On 8 March 2016 the last two rounds were swapped. Rounds denoted with a blue background are part of the Spanish Formula Three Championship.

Round		Circuit	Date	Pole position	Fastest lap	Winning driver	Winning team	Rookie Winner
NC	R1	(France) Circuit Paul Ricard, Le Castellet	5 March	(Austria) Ferdinand Habsburg	(Ecuador) Julio Moreno	(Italy) Leonardo Pulcini	(Spain) Campos Racing	(Austria) Ferdinand Habsburg
NC	R2	(France) Circuit Paul Ricard, Le Castellet	5 March		(Mexico) Diego Menchaca	(Mexico) Diego Menchaca	(Spain) Campos Racing	(Austria) Ferdinand Habsburg
1	R1	(Portugal) Autódromo do Estoril	23 April	(Italy) Leonardo Pulcini	(Italy) Leonardo Pulcini	(Italy) Leonardo Pulcini	(Spain) Campos Racing	(Austria) Ferdinand Habsburg
1	R2	(Portugal) Autódromo do Estoril	24 April	(United Kingdom) Jack Aitken	(United Kingdom) Jack Aitken	(United Kingdom) Jack Aitken	(Italy) RP Motorsport	(United States) Colton Herta
2	R1	(Belgium) Circuit de Spa-Francorchamps	21 May	(Italy) Leonardo Pulcini	(Austria) Ferdinand Habsburg	(United Kingdom) Jack Aitken	(Italy) RP Motorsport	(Austria) Ferdinand Habsburg
2	R2	(Belgium) Circuit de Spa-Francorchamps	22 May	(United Kingdom) Jack Aitken	(Mexico) Diego Menchaca	(Italy) Leonardo Pulcini	(Spain) Campos Racing	(Austria) Ferdinand Habsburg
3	R1	(France) Circuit Paul Ricard, Le Castellet	4 June	(Austria) Ferdinand Habsburg	(Italy) Leonardo Pulcini	(Austria) Ferdinand Habsburg	(Spain) Drivex School	(Austria) Ferdinand Habsburg
3	R2	(France) Circuit Paul Ricard, Le Castellet	5 June	(Austria) Ferdinand Habsburg	(Italy) Leonardo Pulcini	(Italy) Leonardo Pulcini	(Spain) Campos Racing	(Austria) Ferdinand Habsburg
4	R1	(United Kingdom) Silverstone Circuit	23 July	(Italy) Leonardo Pulcini	(Italy) Leonardo Pulcini	(Italy) Leonardo Pulcini	(Spain) Campos Racing	(United States) Colton Herta
4	R2	(United Kingdom) Silverstone Circuit	24 July	(United States) Colton Herta	(Italy) Leonardo Pulcini	(Poland) Antoni Ptak Jr.	(Italy) RP Motorsport	(Austria) Ferdinand Habsburg
5	R1	(Austria) Red Bull Ring, Spielberg	10 September	(United States) Colton Herta (Note: Originally scored by Ferdinand Habsburg, the Austrian and 2nd placed driver Tatiana Calderón were handed 4-place grid penalties for having competed earlier in the season at the circuit. Despite this the point was kept by Habsburg.)	(United States) Colton Herta	(United States) Colton Herta	(United Kingdom) Carlin Motorsport	(United States) Colton Herta
5	R2	(Austria) Red Bull Ring, Spielberg	11 September	(United States) Colton Herta	(United States) Colton Herta	(United States) Colton Herta	(United Kingdom) Carlin Motorsport	(United States) Colton Herta
6	R1	(Italy) Autodromo Nazionale Monza	1 October	(Italy) Damiano Fioravanti	(Poland) Antoni Ptak Jr.	(Italy) Leonardo Pulcini	(Spain) Campos Racing	(Austria) Ferdinand Habsburg
6	R2	(Italy) Autodromo Nazionale Monza	2 October	(Russia) Nikita Troitskiy	(United States) Colton Herta	(Italy) Leonardo Pulcini	(Spain) Campos Racing	(Austria) Ferdinand Habsburg
7	R1	(Spain) Circuito de Jerez	29 October	(United States) Colton Herta	(United States) Colton Herta	(United States) Colton Herta	(United Kingdom) Carlin Motorsport	(United States) Colton Herta
7	R2	(Spain) Circuito de Jerez	30 October	(Austria) Ferdinand Habsburg	(Italy) Leonardo Pulcini	(Italy) Leonardo Pulcini	(Spain) Campos Racing	(Austria) Ferdinand Habsburg
8	R1	(Spain) Circuit de Barcelona-Catalunya	5 November	(United States) Colton Herta	(Italy) Leonardo Pulcini	(Austria) Ferdinand Habsburg	(Spain) Drivex School	(Austria) Ferdinand Habsburg
8	R2	(Spain) Circuit de Barcelona-Catalunya	6 November	(Austria) Ferdinand Habsburg	(Italy) Leonardo Pulcini	(United States) Colton Herta	(United Kingdom) Carlin Motorsport	(United States) Colton Herta

== Championship standings ==
=== Euroformula Open Championship ===
==== Drivers' championship ====
- Points were awarded as follows:

1	2	3	4	5	6	7	8	9	10	PP	FL
25	18	15	12	10	8	6	4	2	1	**1**	1

Pos	Driver	LEC1 (France)		EST (Portugal)		SPA (Belgium)		LEC2 (France)		SIL (United Kingdom)		RBR (Austria)		MNZ (Italy)		JER (Spain)		CAT (Spain)		Pts
1	(Italy) Leonardo Pulcini	1	3	**1**	2	**2**	1	2	1	**1**	17	4	2	1	1	2	1	16	3	303
2	(Austria) Ferdinand Habsburg	**3**	2	2	9	3	3	**1**	**2**	4	2	2	Ret	3	2	7	**2**	1	**2**	247
3	(United States) Colton Herta			Ret	5	6	5	18	EX	2	**Ret**	**1**	**1**	16	4	**1**	4	**2**	1	199
4	(Mexico) Diego Menchaca	4	1	3	4	8	4	3	3	7	6	Ret	3	6	Ret	5	6	18	6	145
5	(Italy) Damiano Fioravanti	5	8	4	3	5	10	6	17	5	3	8	8	**2**	Ret	3	Ret	4	7	136
6	(Poland) Antoni Ptak Jr.	6	6	Ret	DNS	Ret	13	4	4	3	1	Ret	13	5	Ret	11	Ret	8	5	94
7	(Thailand) Tanart Sathienthirakul			5	15	4	6	8	5	Ret	12	5	6	7	9	12	10	13	9	80
8	(United Kingdom) Jack Aitken	7	7	17	**1**	1	**2**													71
9	(Colombia) Tatiana Calderón	2	5	Ret	6	13	8					3	5			6	7	7	12	66
10	(Poland) Igor Waliłko	11	18	6	7	7	9	5	6	8	7									50
11	(United Kingdom) Enaam Ahmed					10	19	7	Ret	6	4			4	5					49
12	(Germany) Keyvan Andres Soori	15	14	9	10	9	21	14	8	13	13	6	16	Ret	7	9	11	5	Ret	42
13	(Russia) Nikita Troitskiy											7	4	10	**3**					36
14	(Ecuador) Julio Moreno	8	4	8	8	Ret	7	Ret	7	11	9	Ret	9	Ret	Ret	14	16	9	11	30
15	(India) Ameya Vaidyanathan	16	19	15	12	15	12	13	DNS	DNS	11	9	7	17	14	10	9	6	Ret	26
16	(China) Ye Hongli			19	14					Ret	8			8	8	8	8			26
17	(Thailand) Kantadhee Kusiri	9	9	7	13	18	15	9	9	10	5	Ret	12	11	16	17	15	15	16	21
18	(Russia) Nikita Zlobin	Ret	Ret	11	16	Ret	DNS	12	10	12	15	10	11	9	10	Ret	12	10	10	12
19	(United Kingdom) Sam Macleod													12	6					8
20	(Russia) Vladimir Atoev							Ret	14	9	10	Ret	13							3
21	(Russia) Daniil Pronenko	13	10	12	17	11	20	10	14			Ret	15	Ret	13	15	13	11	15	2
22	(Italy) Riccardo Cazzaniga	10	11					Ret	12			11	10	13	12					1
23	(Italy) Daniele Cazzaniga			10	18	Ret	14			14	14			15	11					1
24	(China) Kang Ling	Ret	DNS	13	11	14	11	11	11											0
25	(Romania) Petru Florescu	19	13	14	19	12	16													0
26	(Azerbaijan) Gülhüseyn Abdullayev	18	17	18	21	16	17	15	14	15	16	Ret	DNS	14	15	16	14	17	14	0
27	(Mexico) Jose Manuel Vilalta	12	12	16	20	Ret	Ret	16	Ret											0
28	(China) Liang Jiatong	17	16			17	18	17	16											0
Guest drivers ineligible to score points
	(United Kingdom) Harrison Scott															4	3			0
	(France) Dorian Boccolacci																	3	4	0
	(Russia) Vasily Romanov															13	5	12	8	0
	(Spain) Xavier Lloveras																	14	13	0
Non-championship round-only drivers
	(United States) Nicholas Loro Silva	14	15																	0
Pos	Driver	LEC1 (France)		EST (Portugal)		SPA (Belgium)		LEC2 (France)		SIL (United Kingdom)		RBR (Austria)		MNZ (Italy)		JER (Spain)		CAT (Spain)		Pts

Colour	Result
Gold	Winner
Silver	Second place
Bronze	Third place
Green	Points classification
Blue	Non-points classification
Blue	Non-classified finish (NC)
Purple	Retired, not classified (Ret)
Red	Did not qualify (DNQ)
Red	Did not pre-qualify (DNPQ)
Black	Disqualified (DSQ)
White	Did not start (DNS)
White	Withdrew (WD)
White	Race cancelled (C)
Blank	Did not practice (DNP)
Blank	Did not arrive (DNA)
Blank	Excluded (EX)

**Bold** – Pole
Italics – Fastest Lap

==== Rookies' championship ====
- Points were awarded as follows:

1	2	3	4	5
10	8	6	4	3

Pos	Driver	LEC1 (France)		EST (Portugal)		SPA (Belgium)		LEC2 (France)		SIL (United Kingdom)		RBR (Austria)		MNZ (Italy)		JER (Spain)		CAT (Spain)		Pts
1	(Austria) Ferdinand Habsburg	3	2	2	9	3	3	1	2	4	2	2	Ret	3	2	7	2	2	2	140
2	(United States) Colton Herta			Ret	5	6	5	18	EX	2	Ret	1	1	16	4	1	4	3	1	98
3	(Germany) Keyvan Andres Soori	15	14	9	10	9	21	14	9	13	13	6	16	Ret	7	9	11	5	Ret	56
4	(United Kingdom) Enaam Ahmed					10	19	7	Ret	6	4			4	5					38
5	(India) Ameya Vaidyanathan	16	19	15	12	15	12	13	DNS	DNS	11	9	7	17	14	10	9	6	Ret	37
6	(China) Ye Hongli			19	14					Ret	8			8	8	8	8			27
7	(Russia) Nikita Troitskiy											7	4	10	3					24
8	(Russia) Daniil Pronenko	13	10	12	17	11	20	10	15			Ret	15	Ret	13	15	13	11	15	24
9	(Italy) Riccardo Cazzaniga	10	11					Ret	13			11	10	13	12					13
10	(Italy) Daniele Cazzaniga			10	18	Ret	14			14	14			15	11					10
11	(Azerbaijan) Gülhüseyn Abdullayev	18	17	18	21	16	17	15	16	15	16	Ret	DNS	14	15	16	14	17	14	9
12	(Russia) Vladimir Atoev							Ret	14	9	10	Ret	14							8
13	(Romania) Petru Florescu	19	13	14	19	12	16													6
14	(China) Liang Jiatong	17	16			17	18	17	17											0
Non-championship round-only drivers
	(United States) Nicholas Loro Silva	14	15																	0
Pos	Driver	LEC1 (France)		EST (Portugal)		SPA (Belgium)		LEC2 (France)		SIL (United Kingdom)		RBR (Austria)		MNZ (Italy)		JER (Spain)		CAT (Spain)		Pts

==== Teams' championship ====
- Points were awarded as follows:

1	2	3	4	5
10	8	6	4	3

Pos	Team	LEC1 (France)		EST (Portugal)		SPA (Belgium)		LEC2 (France)		SIL (United Kingdom)		RBR (Austria)		MNZ (Italy)		JER (Spain)		CAT (Spain)		Pts
1	(Spain) Campos Racing	1	1	1	2	2	1	2	1	1	6	4	2	1	1	2	1	9	3	120
2	(Spain) Drivex School	3	2	2	9	3	3	1	2	4	2	2	4	3	2	7	2	1	2	102
3	(Italy) RP Motorsport	5	6	4	1	1	2	4	4	3	1	3	5	2	5	3	7	4	5	95
4	(United Kingdom) Carlin Motorsport	15	14	Ret	5	6	5	13	8	2	11	1	1	16	4	1	4	2	1	72
5	(United Kingdom) Fortec Motorsports			6	7	7	9	5	6	8	7			12	6					3
6	(Italy) DAV Racing	10	11	10	11	14	11	11	11	14	14	11	10	13	11					0
7	(Spain) Teo Martín Motorsport	2	5	11	6	12	8	12	10	9	10	10	11	9	10	Ret	12	10	10	0
8	(Italy) BVM Racing	13	10	12	14	11	20	10	14	Ret	8	Ret	15	8	8	8	8	11	15	0
9	(United Kingdom) Team West-Tec	17	16			17	18	17	16											0
Pos	Driver	LEC1 (France)		EST (Portugal)		SPA (Belgium)		LEC2 (France)		SIL (United Kingdom)		RBR (Austria)		MNZ (Italy)		JER (Spain)		CAT (Spain)		Pts

=== Spanish Formula Three Championship ===
==== Drivers' championship ====
- Points were awarded as follows:

1	2	3	4	5	6	7	8	9	10	PP	FL
25	18	15	12	10	8	6	4	2	1	**1**	1

Pos	Driver	EST (Portugal)		JER (Spain)		CAT (Spain)		Pts
1	(Italy) Leonardo Pulcini	**1**	2	2	1	16	3	105
2	(United States) Colton Herta	Ret	5	**1**	4	**2**	1	94
3	(Austria) Ferdinand Habsburg	2	9	7	2	1	**2**	90
4	(Italy) Damiano Fioravanti	4	3	3	Ret	4	7	60
5	(Mexico) Diego Menchaca	3	4	5	6	18	6	57
6	(Colombia) Tatiana Calderón	Ret	6	6	7	7	12	32
7	(United Kingdom) Jack Aitken	17	**1**					27
8	(France) Dorian Boccolacci					3	4	27
9	(Germany) Keyvan Andres Soori	9	10	9	11	5	Ret	18
10	(Russia) Vasily Romanov			13	5	12	8	16
12	(Thailand) Tanart Sathienthirakul	5	15	12	10	13	9	14
13	(Poland) Igor Waliłko	6	7					14
14	(India) Ameya Vaidyanathan	15	12	10	9	6	Ret	14
15	(China) Ye Hongli	19	14	8	8			12
16	(Ecuador) Julio Moreno	8	8	14	16	9	11	10
17	(Thailand) Kantadhee Kusiri	7	13	17	15	15	16	6
18	(Russia) Nikita Zlobin	11	16	Ret	12	10	10	3
19	(Russia) Daniil Pronenko	12	17	15	13	11	15	0
20	(China) Ling Kang	13	11					0
21	(Spain) Xavier Lloveras					14	13	0
22	(Azerbaijan) Gülhüseyn Abdullayev	18	21	16	14	17	14	0
23	(Romania) Petru Florescu	14	19					0
24	(Mexico) Jose Manuel Vilalta	16	20					0
Guest drivers ineligible to score points
	(United Kingdom) Harrison Scott			4	3			0
	(Italy) Daniele Cazzaniga	10	18					0
Pos	Driver	EST (Portugal)		JER (Spain)		CAT (Spain)		Pts

==== Teams' championship ====
- Points were awarded as follows:

1	2	3	4	5
10	8	6	4	3

Pos	Team	EST (Portugal)		JER (Spain)		CAT (Spain)		Pts
1	(Spain) Campos Racing	1	2	2	1	9	3	42
2	(United Kingdom) Carlin Motorsport	Ret	5	1	4	2	1	37
3	(Spain) Drivex School	2	9	7	2	1	2	34
4	(Italy) RP Motorsport	4	1	3	7	4	5	27
5	(Spain) Teo Martín Motorsport	11	6	Ret	12	3	4	10
6	(Italy) DAV Racing	10	11					0
7	(United Kingdom) Fortec Motorsports	6	7					0
8	(Italy) BVM Racing	12	14	8	8	11	15	0
Pos	Driver	EST (Portugal)		JER (Spain)		CAT (Spain)		Pts
