= 2015–16 MRF Challenge Formula 2000 Championship =

Auto racing championship of India

2015–16 MRF Challenge

Seasons
- ← 2014–15 2016–17 →

The 2015–2016 MRF Challenge Formula 2000 Championship was the fourth running of the MRF Challenge Formula 2000 Championship. It began on 31 October 2015 at Yas Marina Circuit, Abu Dhabi and finished on 31 January 2016 at the Madras Motor Racing Track, India. The series comprised 14 races, spread across four meetings, with the second round in Sakhir being a support event to the FIA World Endurance Championship.

== Drivers ==
No.	Driver	Rounds
2	(Colombia) Tatiana Calderón	All
3	(Australia) Dylan Young	All
4	(Russia) Nikita Troitskiy	All
5	(United Kingdom) Max Fewtrell	All
6	(United Kingdom) Sean Walkinshaw	1–3
7	(United Kingdom) Harrison Newey	All
8	(United Kingdom) Matt Draper	1–3
9	(United Kingdom) Jake Dennis	1
10	(Japan) Nobuharu Matsushita	1
11	(United Kingdom) Alice Powell	1
12	(India) Karthik Tharani	1–2, 4
14	(India) Arjun Narendran	All
15	(India) Tarun Reddy	All
16	(United Kingdom) Laura Tillett	All
17	(Russia) Nerses Isaakyan	All
18	(Brazil) Matheus Leist	2
19	(Germany) Sebastian Balthasar	1
20	(United Kingdom) Jessica Hawkins	2
21	(Brazil) Pietro Fittipaldi	All
22	(France) Christophe Mariot	2
23	(Belgium) Sam Dejonghe	2
24	(Belgium) Alessio Picariello	2–4
25	(Netherlands) Rik Breukers	3
26	(Spain) José Luis Abadín	3
27	(France) Giuliano Alesi	3
28	(Finland) Aleksanteri Huovinen	4
29	(Germany) Mick Schumacher	4
85	(Brazil) Enzo Bortoleto	4

== Race calendar and results ==
The second round in Bahrain was held in support of the FIA World Endurance Championship.

Round		Circuit	Date	Pole position	Fastest lap	Winning driver
2015
1	R1	(United Arab Emirates) Yas Marina Circuit, Abu Dhabi	30 October	(Japan) Nobuharu Matsushita	(Japan) Nobuharu Matsushita	(Japan) Nobuharu Matsushita
1	R2	(United Arab Emirates) Yas Marina Circuit, Abu Dhabi	30 October		(Japan) Nobuharu Matsushita	(Russia) Nikita Troitskiy
1	R3	(United Arab Emirates) Yas Marina Circuit, Abu Dhabi	31 October	(Japan) Nobuharu Matsushita	(Japan) Nobuharu Matsushita	(Japan) Nobuharu Matsushita
1	R4	(United Arab Emirates) Yas Marina Circuit, Abu Dhabi	31 October		(United Kingdom) Jake Dennis	(Brazil) Pietro Fittipaldi
2	R1	Bahrain International Circuit, Sakhir	20 November	(Belgium) Alessio Picariello	(Belgium) Alessio Picariello	(Belgium) Alessio Picariello
2	R2	Bahrain International Circuit, Sakhir	20 November		(Belgium) Alessio Picariello	(Belgium) Alessio Picariello
3	R1	(United Arab Emirates) Dubai Autodrome, Dubai	18 December	(Belgium) Alessio Picariello	(Belgium) Alessio Picariello	(Belgium) Alessio Picariello
3	R2	(United Arab Emirates) Dubai Autodrome, Dubai	18 December		(Colombia) Tatiana Calderón	(Colombia) Tatiana Calderón
3	R3	(United Arab Emirates) Dubai Autodrome, Dubai	19 December	(Belgium) Alessio Picariello	(Brazil) Pietro Fittipaldi	(Belgium) Alessio Picariello
3	R4	(United Arab Emirates) Dubai Autodrome, Dubai	19 December		(Belgium) Alessio Picariello	(Brazil) Pietro Fittipaldi
2016
4	R1	(India) Madras Motor Racing Track, Chennai	30 January	(Brazil) Pietro Fittipaldi	(Brazil) Pietro Fittipaldi	(Brazil) Pietro Fittipaldi
4	R2	(India) Madras Motor Racing Track, Chennai	30 January		(Belgium) Alessio Picariello	(Russia) Nikita Troitskiy
4	R3	(India) Madras Motor Racing Track, Chennai	31 January	(Brazil) Pietro Fittipaldi	(United Kingdom) Harrison Newey	(Brazil) Pietro Fittipaldi
4	R4	(India) Madras Motor Racing Track, Chennai	31 January		(Belgium) Alessio Picariello	(Belgium) Alessio Picariello

== Championship standings ==
Scoring system

Position	1st	2nd	3rd	4th	5th	6th	7th	8th	9th	10th	R1 PP	FL
Points	25	18	15	12	10	8	6	4	2	1	2	2

Drivers' standings

Pos.	Driver	ABU (United Arab Emirates)				BHR (Bahrain)		DUB (United Arab Emirates)				CHE (India)				Points
1	(Brazil) Pietro Fittipaldi	2	3	5	1	4	2	2	5	3	1	**1**	5	**1**	4	244
2	(Colombia) Tatiana Calderón	5	2	3	2	3	6	4	1	4	3	5	4	4	3	199
3	(Russia) Nikita Troitskiy	4	1	6	6	2	3	3	2	2	DSQ	8	1	3	5	191
4	(Belgium) Alessio Picariello					**1**	1	**1**	8	**1**	2	4	Ret	6	1	181
5	(United Kingdom) Harrison Newey	10	7	7	16	7	4	7	Ret	5	DSQ	2	2	2	8	107
6	(Japan) Nobuharu Matsushita	**1**	5	**1**	4											80
7	(India) Tarun Reddy	6	4	4	3	11	Ret	5	12	7	10	6	Ret	12	9	74
8	(Russia) Nerses Isaakyan	12	9	11	7	Ret	9	8	4	13	4	7	3	Ret	Ret	59
9	(United Kingdom) Jake Dennis	3	6	2	5											53
10	(Germany) Mick Schumacher											3	6	5	2	51
11	(United Kingdom) Max Fewtrell	11	11	10	13	10	10	6	3	8	Ret	10	7	7	6	51
12	(United Kingdom) Sean Walkinshaw	8	8	8	10	6	8	Ret	Ret	6	9					35
13	(Australia) Dylan Young	15†	12	12	11	8	11	9	6	Ret	7	9	9	9	7	32
14	(Brazil) Matheus Leist					5	5									20
15	(Netherlands) Rik Breukers							15	11	10	5					11
16	(United Kingdom) Laura Tillett	Ret	15	14	9	Ret	16	12	10	14	6	12	Ret	11	13	11
17	(Spain) José Luis Abadín							11	7	11	8					10
18	(United Kingdom) Alice Powell	9	10	9	8											9
19	(Belgium) Sam Dejonghe					9	7									8
20	(Germany) Sebastian Balthasar	7	17	Ret	15											6
21	(Brazil) Enzo Bortoleto											11	8	Ret	10	5
22	(Finland) Aleksanteri Huovinen											Ret	10	8	12	5
23	(France) Giuliano Alesi							10	Ret	9	12					3
24	(United Kingdom) Matt Draper	13	14	15	14	13	13	13	9	12	Ret					2
25	(India) Arjun Narendran	14	16	16	Ret	14	14	14	13	15	11	14	12	10	11	1
26	(India) Karthik Tharani	Ret	13	13	12	12	12					13	11	Ret	Ret	0
27	(United Kingdom) Jessica Hawkins					15	15									0
28	(France) Christophe Mariot					16	17									0
Pos.	Driver	ABU (United Arab Emirates)				BHR (Bahrain)		DUB (United Arab Emirates)				CHE (India)				Points

Colour	Result
Gold	Winner
Silver	Second place
Bronze	Third place
Green	Points classification
Blue	Non-points classification
Blue	Non-classified finish (NC)
Purple	Retired, not classified (Ret)
Red	Did not qualify (DNQ)
Red	Did not pre-qualify (DNPQ)
Black	Disqualified (DSQ)
White	Did not start (DNS)
White	Withdrew (WD)
White	Race cancelled (C)
Blank	Did not practice (DNP)
Blank	Did not arrive (DNA)
Blank	Excluded (EX)

**Bold** – Pole
Italics – Fastest Lap
