= 2016 Eurocup Formula Renault 2.0 =

Motor racing competition

Seasons
- ← 2015 2017 →

The 2016 Eurocup Formula Renault 2.0 was a multi-event motor racing championship for open wheel, formula racing cars held across Europe. The championship features drivers competing in 2 litre Formula Renault single seat race cars that conform to the technical regulations for the championship.

The 2016 season was the 26th and final season Eurocup Formula Renault 2.0 season organized by the Renault Sport and the first season as the main category of the World Series by Renault. The season began at Ciudad del Motor de Aragón on 16 April and finished on 23 October at Autódromo do Estoril. The series formed part of the World Series by Renault meetings at six events.

== Teams and drivers ==
Team	No.	Driver name	Status	Rounds
(Germany) Josef Kaufmann Racing	1	(India) Jehan Daruvala		All
(Germany) Josef Kaufmann Racing	2	(United Kingdom) Lando Norris	R	All
(Germany) Josef Kaufmann Racing	3	(Russia) Robert Shwartzman	R	All
(United Kingdom) Fortec Motorsports	5	(Russia) Vasily Romanov		1–4
(United Kingdom) Fortec Motorsports	5	(Russia) Aleksandr Vartanyan	R G	7
(United Kingdom) Fortec Motorsports	6	(Brazil) Bruno Baptista		All
(United Kingdom) Fortec Motorsports	7	(Russia) Nikita Troitskiy	R G	1, 3, 5–7
(United Kingdom) Fortec Motorsports	49	(United Kingdom) Frank Bird	R G	7
(United Kingdom) Fortec Motorsports	62	(Austria) Ferdinand Habsburg		All
(France) Tech 1 Racing	9	(France) Dorian Boccolacci		All
(France) Tech 1 Racing	10	(Switzerland) Hugo de Sadeleer		All
(France) Tech 1 Racing	11	(France) Sacha Fenestraz	R	All
(France) Tech 1 Racing	12	(France) Gabriel Aubry	R	All
(France) R-ace GP	14	(United Kingdom) Will Palmer	R	All
(France) R-ace GP	16	(France) Julien Falchero	R	All
(France) R-ace GP	33	(Belgium) Max Defourny		All
(France) R-ace GP	47	(New Zealand) Marcus Armstrong	R G	7
(Italy) JD Motorsport	17	(Russia) Aleksey Korneev	R	All
(Italy) JD Motorsport	18	(Australia) James Allen		All
(Italy) JD Motorsport	46	(United Kingdom) Finlay Hutchison	R G	5
(Spain) AVF by Adrián Vallés	21	(Portugal) Henrique Chaves		All
(Spain) AVF by Adrián Vallés	22	(United Kingdom) Harrison Scott		All
(Spain) AVF by Adrián Vallés	23	(Russia) Nerses Isaakyan	R G	1
(Spain) AVF by Adrián Vallés	23	(Russia) Nikita Mazepin		2–3
(Spain) AVF by Adrián Vallés	24	(Romania) Petru Florescu	R	2–3
(Spain) AVF by Adrián Vallés	42	(Poland) Julia Pankiewicz	R G	1
(Spain) AVF by Adrián Vallés	43	(Russia) Nerses Isaakyan	R G	3
(Italy) Cram Motorsport	30	(Peru) Rodrigo Pflucker	R	1–2
(Italy) Cram Motorsport	31	(Canada) David Richert		1–3
(Italy) Cram Motorsport	31	(Poland) Antoni Ptak Jr.	G	5
(Italy) Technorace	35	(Italy) Alessandro Perullo	R	All
(United Kingdom) MGR Motorsport	38	(United States) David Porcelli	R	1–2
(United Kingdom) MGR Motorsport	38	(United Kingdom) Colin Noble	G	3
(United Kingdom) Mark Burdett Motorsport	44	(United Kingdom) Finlay Hutchison	R G	4
(Belgium) GMMA Formula Racing	45	(Belgium) Ghislain Cordeel	R G	5–7
(Italy) TS Corse	48	(Australia) Alex Peroni	G	7

Icon	Status
R	Rookie
G	Guest drivers ineligible for points

== Race calendar and results ==
The provisional calendar for the 2016 season was announced on 5 September 2015, The championship will take the Formula Renault 3.5 Series spot in the Monaco Grand Prix schedule. Rounds at Spielberg, Le Castellet and Estoril will return in the series' calendar. These rounds (as well as Spa) will be collaboration with European Le Mans Series. On 9 October 2015, was announced that Monza round will be included in the schedule. The round was supported by Clio Cup Italia.

Round		Circuit	Date	Pole position	Fastest lap	Winning driver	Winning team	Rookie winner
1	R1	(Spain) Ciudad del Motor de Aragón, Alcañiz	16 April	(Belgium) Max Defourny	(United Kingdom) Lando Norris	(Belgium) Max Defourny	(France) R-ace GP	(United Kingdom) Lando Norris
1	R2	(Spain) Ciudad del Motor de Aragón, Alcañiz	16 April	(Belgium) Max Defourny	(India) Jehan Daruvala	(United Kingdom) Lando Norris	(Germany) Josef Kaufmann Racing	(United Kingdom) Lando Norris
1	R3	(Spain) Ciudad del Motor de Aragón, Alcañiz	17 April	(United Kingdom) Lando Norris	(Belgium) Max Defourny	(United Kingdom) Lando Norris	(Germany) Josef Kaufmann Racing	(United Kingdom) Lando Norris
2	R	Circuit de Monaco, Monte Carlo	29 May	(France) Sacha Fenestraz (Note: Originally scored by Lando Norris, the Brit had all his times deleted due to a breach of the technical regulations. Ferdinand Habsburg would have inherited pole position, but he had to serve a 2-place grid penalty from the previous round.)	(France) Sacha Fenestraz	(France) Sacha Fenestraz	(France) Tech 1 Racing	(France) Sacha Fenestraz
3	R1	(Italy) Autodromo Nazionale Monza, Monza	2 July	(France) Dorian Boccolacci	(France) Dorian Boccolacci	(United Kingdom) Lando Norris	(Germany) Josef Kaufmann Racing	(United Kingdom) Lando Norris
3	R2	(Italy) Autodromo Nazionale Monza, Monza	2 July	(United Kingdom) Lando Norris	(Belgium) Max Defourny	(France) Dorian Boccolacci	(France) Tech 1 Racing	(France) Sacha Fenestraz
3	R3	(Italy) Autodromo Nazionale Monza, Monza	3 July	(France) Dorian Boccolacci	(France) Dorian Boccolacci	(United Kingdom) Harrison Scott	(Spain) AVF by Adrián Vallés	(United Kingdom) Lando Norris
4	R1	(Austria) Red Bull Ring, Spielberg	16 July	(United Kingdom) Lando Norris	(France) Dorian Boccolacci	(United Kingdom) Lando Norris	(Germany) Josef Kaufmann Racing	(United Kingdom) Lando Norris
4	R2	(Austria) Red Bull Ring, Spielberg	17 July	(United Kingdom) Harrison Scott	(Belgium) Max Defourny	(United Kingdom) Harrison Scott	(Spain) AVF by Adrián Vallés	(United Kingdom) Lando Norris
5	R1	(France) Circuit Paul Ricard, Le Castellet	27 August	(United Kingdom) Harrison Scott	(United Kingdom) Lando Norris	(United Kingdom) Harrison Scott	(Spain) AVF by Adrián Vallés	(United Kingdom) Lando Norris
5	R2	(France) Circuit Paul Ricard, Le Castellet	28 August	(United Kingdom) Lando Norris	(United Kingdom) Lando Norris	(United Kingdom) Lando Norris	(Germany) Josef Kaufmann Racing	(United Kingdom) Lando Norris
6	R1	(Belgium) Circuit de Spa-Francorchamps, Spa	24 September	(United Kingdom) Lando Norris	(Belgium) Max Defourny	(Switzerland) Hugo de Sadeleer	(France) Tech 1 Racing	(United Kingdom) Lando Norris
6	R2	(Belgium) Circuit de Spa-Francorchamps, Spa	25 September	(Belgium) Max Defourny	(United Kingdom) Lando Norris	(France) Dorian Boccolacci	(France) Tech 1 Racing	(United Kingdom) Lando Norris
7	R1	(Portugal) Autódromo Fernanda Pires da Silva, Estoril	22 October	(United Kingdom) Lando Norris	(Belgium) Max Defourny	(United Kingdom) Will Palmer	(France) R-ace GP	(United Kingdom) Will Palmer
7	R2	(Portugal) Autódromo Fernanda Pires da Silva, Estoril	23 October	(France) Sacha Fenestraz	(United Kingdom) Will Palmer	(France) Sacha Fenestraz	(France) Tech 1 Racing	(France) Sacha Fenestraz

== Championship standings ==
Points system

Points were awarded to the top 10 classified finishers.

Position	**1st**	**2nd**	**3rd**	**4th**	**5th**	**6th**	**7th**	**8th**	**9th**	**10th**
Points	25	18	15	12	10	8	6	4	2	1

=== Drivers' Championship ===
Pos	Driver	ARA (Spain)			MON (Monaco)	MNZ (Italy)			RBR (Austria)		LEC (France)		SPA (Belgium)		EST (Portugal)		Pts
Pos	Driver	1	2	3	4	5	6	7	8	9	10	11	12	13	14	15	Pts
1	(United Kingdom) Lando Norris	2	1	**1**	16	1	**7**	2	**1**	3	2	**1**	**3**	2	**16**	2	253
2	(France) Dorian Boccolacci	11	2	4	4	**2**	1	3	10	4	5	3	2	1	5	4	200
3	(Belgium) Max Defourny	**1**	**4**	2	3	8	2	4	2	2	4	2	11	**15**	Ret	3	188.5
4	(United Kingdom) Harrison Scott	4	3	3	8	3	13	1	4	**1**	**1**	9	14	5	6	8	172
5	(France) Sacha Fenestraz	Ret	14	15	**1**	4	3	8	13	10	6	5	4	4	7	**1**	119.5
6	(Switzerland) Hugo de Sadeleer	Ret	DNS	18	11	10	4	13	6	11	Ret	8	1	3	2	7	89
7	(United Kingdom) Will Palmer	13	6	20	9	6	Ret	7	Ret	6	3	10	Ret	9	1	22	76
8	(Russia) Robert Shwartzman	5	8	9	12	5	6	6	11	Ret	7	11	Ret	14	3	6	75
9	(India) Jehan Daruvala	3	5	13	15	7	Ret	Ret	5	7	Ret	7	9	Ret	10	11	62
10	(Austria) Ferdinand Habsburg	10	7	12	2	Ret	10	12	3	8	8	6	7	11	Ret	12	57
11	(Portugal) Henrique Chaves	7	9	16	6	16	Ret	10	15	5	12	18	17	8	17	5	41
12	(France) Gabriel Aubry	Ret	10	11	7	Ret	Ret	5	14	12	15	4	6	Ret	Ret	15	35
13	(France) Julien Falchero	15	11	7	10	13	9	11	7	16	9	12	10	7	12	12	32.5
14	(Brazil) Bruno Baptista	6	12	6	Ret	Ret	15	Ret	9	13	Ret	14	15	12	8	9	28
15	(Russia) Aleksey Korneev	9	15	8	18	9	Ret	9	8	9	11	13	12	13	13	19	22
16	(Russia) Nikita Mazepin				5	12	8	Ret									11
17	(Australia) James Allen	17	13	17	13	19	11	17	12	15	13	16	5	Ret	Ret	13	11
18	(Russia) Vasily Romanov	14	Ret	10	19	11	14	Ret	16	14							2
19	(Italy) Alessandro Perullo	Ret	DNS	DNS	21	17	12	14	Ret	Ret	14	21	16	10			2
20	(Peru) Rodrigo Pflucker	16	16	19	14												0
21	(Romania) Petru Florescu				17	15	17	15									0
22	(United States) David Porcelli	18	17	21	Ret												0
23	(Canada) David Richert	20	18	22	20	18	19	19									0
Guest drivers ineligible for points
	(Australia) Alex Peroni														4	18	0
	(Russia) Nikita Troitskiy	8	Ret	5		22	5	Ret			Ret	17	8	6	11	16	0
	(New Zealand) Marcus Armstrong														9	10	0
	(Poland) Antoni Ptak Jr.										10	15					0
	(Russia) Nerses Isaakyan	12	20	14		14	16	16									0
	(Belgium) Ghislain Cordeel										16	19	13	DNS	14	21	0
	(United Kingdom) Frank Bird														15	20	0
	(United Kingdom) Colin Noble					Ret	18	18									0
	(Poland) Julia Pankiewicz	19	19	23													0
	(United Kingdom) Finlay Hutchison								Ret	Ret	Ret	20					0
	(Russia) Aleksandr Vartanyan														Ret	17	0
Pos	Driver	ARA (Spain)			MON (Monaco)	MNZ (Italy)			RBR (Austria)		LEC (France)		SPA (Belgium)		EST (Portugal)		Pts

Colour	Result
Gold	Winner
Silver	Second place
Bronze	Third place
Green	Points classification
Blue	Non-points classification
Blue	Non-classified finish (NC)
Purple	Retired, not classified (Ret)
Red	Did not qualify (DNQ)
Red	Did not pre-qualify (DNPQ)
Black	Disqualified (DSQ)
White	Did not start (DNS)
White	Withdrew (WD)
White	Race cancelled (C)
Blank	Did not practice (DNP)
Blank	Did not arrive (DNA)
Blank	Excluded (EX)

**Bold** – Pole
Italics – Fastest Lap

Rookie

=== Teams' Championship ===
Pos.	Team	Points
1	(Germany) Josef Kaufmann Racing	334
2	(France) Tech 1 Racing	319.5
3	(France) R-ace GP	231.5
4	(Spain) AVF by Adrián Vallés	211
5	(United Kingdom) Fortec Motorsports	79
6	(Italy) JD Motorsport	33
7	(Italy) Technorace	0
8	(Italy) Cram Motorsport	0
9	(United Kingdom) MGR Motorsport	0
