= 2017 Euroformula Open Championship =

Motor racing competition

The 2017 Euroformula Open Championship was a multi-event motor racing championship for single-seat open wheel formula racing cars that held across Europe. The championship will feature drivers competing in two-litre Formula Three racing cars built by Italian constructor Dallara which conform to the technical regulations, or formula, for the championship. It was the fourth Euroformula Open Championship season.

The season was dominated by Harrison Scott, who holds the record for most wins, poles and fastest laps in a rookie season of the Euroformula Open Championship (but he wasn't eligible to the rookie's championship due to his 2016 Masters of Formula 3 experience). He clinched drivers' title at Monza with two rounds to spare and mostly by his race results was granted teams' title to RP Motorsport. Drivex driver Nikita Troitskiy finished as runner-up, losing to Scott by 118 points. Troitkiy won the rookies' championship. Devlin DeFrancesco won race at Circuito de Jerez and completed the top-three in the driver standings. DeFrancesco became the Spanish Formula 3 champion.

== Teams and drivers ==
- All cars were powered by Toyota engines, used Dallara chassis and equipped with Michelin tyres.

Team	No.	Driver	Status	Rounds
(Spain) Campos Racing	1	(Romania) Petru Florescu	R	NC, 1–3
(Spain) Campos Racing	1	(South Africa) Raoul Hyman		4
(Spain) Campos Racing	1	(United States) Cameron Das		5–8
(Spain) Campos Racing	2	(Finland) Simo Laaksonen	R	NC
(Spain) Campos Racing	2	(Brazil) Thiago Vivacqua		All
(Spain) Campos Racing	3	(Brazil) Thiago Vivacqua		NC
(Spain) Campos Racing	3	(Finland) Simo Laaksonen	R	All
(Spain) Campos Racing	4	(Italy) Lorenzo Colombo	G	8
(Spain) Campos Racing	4	(Brazil) Matheus Iorio		NC
(Spain) Campos Racing	34	(Brazil) Matheus Iorio		All
(Italy) RP Motorsport	7	(Germany) Jannes Fittje	R	6–8
(Italy) RP Motorsport	8	(Italy) Lodovico Laurini	R	NC, All
(Italy) RP Motorsport	9	(Thailand) Kane Shepherd	R	NC
(Italy) RP Motorsport	9	(Brazil) Felipe Drugovich	G	8
(Italy) RP Motorsport	10	(United Kingdom) Harrison Scott		NC, 1–7
(Italy) RP Motorsport	11	(Poland) Alex Karkosik	R	All
(Spain) Drivex School	12	(Brazil) Christian Hahn		NC, All
(Spain) Drivex School	14	(India) Tarun Reddy	R	5–8
(Spain) Drivex School	16	(Russia) Nikita Troitskiy	R	NC, All
(United Kingdom) Carlin Motorsport	14	(India) Tarun Reddy	R	1–4
(United Kingdom) Carlin Motorsport	17	(Canada) Devlin DeFrancesco	R	NC, All
(United Kingdom) Carlin Motorsport	24	(India) Ameya Vaidyanathan		NC, All
(United Kingdom) Carlin Motorsport	77	(Brazil) Guilherme Samaia		5–8
(United Kingdom) Fortec Motorsports	18	(Germany) Jannes Fittje	R	NC, 1–5
(United Kingdom) Fortec Motorsports	18	(Russia) Yan Leon Shlom	R	6
(United Kingdom) Fortec Motorsports	19	(Russia) Yan Leon Shlom	R	NC, 1
(United Kingdom) Fortec Motorsports	19	(United Kingdom) Ben Hingeley		5–8
(United Kingdom) Fortec Motorsports	20	(Ukraine) Aleksey Chuklin		NC
(United Kingdom) Fortec Motorsports	20	(Malaysia) Najiy Razak	R	1
(United Kingdom) Fortec Motorsports	20	(Romania) Petru Florescu	R	4–8
(United Kingdom) Fortec Motorsports	21	(Ukraine) Aleksey Chuklin		2–3
(Italy) BVM Racing	22	(Russia) Daniil Pronenko		NC, All
(Italy) BVM Racing	55	(China) Daniel Lu		6–7
(Italy) BVM Racing	55	(Australia) Joey Mawson	G	8
(Spain) Teo Martín Motorsport	42	(Spain) Eliseo Martínez	R	NC, All
(Spain) Teo Martín Motorsport	43	(Brazil) Pedro Cardoso		NC, All
(Spain) Teo Martín Motorsport	44	(Spain) Javier Cobián	R	NC, 1

Icon	Legend
G	Guest driver
R	Rookie Trophy

== Race calendar and results ==
An eight-round calendar was confirmed on 15 February 2017. All rounds will support the International GT Open, except for Jerez, which will be headlined by both Formula 2 and GP3 Series. Rounds denoted with a blue background are part of the Spanish Formula Three Championship.

Round		Circuit	Date	Pole position	Fastest lap	Winning driver	Winning team	Rookie Winner
NC	R1	(France) Circuit Paul Ricard, Le Castellet	4 March	(Germany) Jannes Fittje	(Russia) Yan Leon Shlom	(Russia) Yan Leon Shlom	(United Kingdom) Fortec Motorsport	(Russia) Yan Leon Shlom
NC	R2	(France) Circuit Paul Ricard, Le Castellet	4 March		(United Kingdom) Harrison Scott	(United Kingdom) Harrison Scott	(Italy) RP Motorsport	(Russia) Nikita Troitskiy
1	R1	(Portugal) Autódromo do Estoril	29 April	(United Kingdom) Harrison Scott	(India) Ameya Vaidyanathan	(United Kingdom) Harrison Scott	(Italy) RP Motorsport	(Germany) Jannes Fittje
1	R2	(Portugal) Autódromo do Estoril	30 April	(Russia) Nikita Troitskiy	(United Kingdom) Harrison Scott	(United Kingdom) Harrison Scott	(Italy) RP Motorsport	(Russia) Nikita Troitskiy
2	R1	(Belgium) Circuit de Spa-Francorchamps	27 May	(United Kingdom) Harrison Scott	(Brazil) Thiago Vivacqua	(India) Ameya Vaidyanathan	(United Kingdom) Carlin Motorsport	(Canada) Devlin DeFrancesco
2	R2	(Belgium) Circuit de Spa-Francorchamps	28 May	(Russia) Nikita Troitskiy	(United Kingdom) Harrison Scott	(United Kingdom) Harrison Scott	(Italy) RP Motorsport	(Canada) Devlin DeFrancesco
3	R1	(France) Circuit Paul Ricard, Le Castellet	10 June	(United Kingdom) Harrison Scott	(United Kingdom) Harrison Scott	(United Kingdom) Harrison Scott	(Italy) RP Motorsport	(Russia) Nikita Troitskiy
3	R2	(France) Circuit Paul Ricard, Le Castellet	11 June	(United Kingdom) Harrison Scott	(United Kingdom) Harrison Scott	(United Kingdom) Harrison Scott	(Italy) RP Motorsport	(Russia) Nikita Troitskiy
4	R1	(Hungary) Hungaroring	1 July	(South Africa) Raoul Hyman	(Russia) Nikita Troitskiy	(Brazil) Thiago Vivacqua	(Spain) Campos Racing	(Finland) Simo Laaksonen
4	R2	(Hungary) Hungaroring	2 July	(United Kingdom) Harrison Scott	(Russia) Nikita Troitskiy	(United Kingdom) Harrison Scott	(Italy) RP Motorsport	(Russia) Nikita Troitskiy
5	R1	(United Kingdom) Silverstone Circuit	2 September	(United Kingdom) Harrison Scott	(United Kingdom) Harrison Scott	(United Kingdom) Harrison Scott	(Italy) RP Motorsport	(Canada) Devlin DeFrancesco
5	R2	(United Kingdom) Silverstone Circuit	3 September	(United Kingdom) Harrison Scott	(United Kingdom) Harrison Scott	(United Kingdom) Harrison Scott	(Italy) RP Motorsport	(Canada) Devlin DeFrancesco
6	R1	(Italy) Autodromo Nazionale Monza	30 September	(United Kingdom) Harrison Scott	(United Kingdom) Harrison Scott	(United Kingdom) Harrison Scott	(Italy) RP Motorsport	(Russia) Nikita Troitskiy
6	R2	(Italy) Autodromo Nazionale Monza	1 October	(United Kingdom) Harrison Scott	(Russia) Nikita Troitskiy	(United Kingdom) Harrison Scott	(Italy) RP Motorsport	(Germany) Jannes Fittje
7	R1	(Spain) Circuito de Jerez	7 October	(United Kingdom) Harrison Scott	(United Kingdom) Harrison Scott	(United Kingdom) Harrison Scott	(Italy) RP Motorsport	(Canada) Devlin DeFrancesco
7	R2	(Spain) Circuito de Jerez	8 October	(United Kingdom) Harrison Scott	(United Kingdom) Harrison Scott	(United Kingdom) Harrison Scott	(Italy) RP Motorsport	(Russia) Nikita Troitskiy
8	R1	(Spain) Circuit de Barcelona-Catalunya	28 October	(Brazil) Felipe Drugovich (Note: Drugovich set the fastest time in the qualifying and actually started from the pole position, but he was guest driver, so the point for pole was given to Nikita Troitskiy.)	(Poland) Alex Karkosik	(Canada) Devlin DeFrancesco	(United Kingdom) Carlin Motorsport	(Canada) Devlin DeFrancesco
8	R2	(Spain) Circuit de Barcelona-Catalunya	29 October	(India) Ameya Vaidyanathan	(Russia) Nikita Troitskiy	(Brazil) Felipe Drugovich	(Italy) RP Motorsport	(Russia) Nikita Troitskiy

=== Euroformula Open Championship ===
==== Drivers' championship ====
- Points were awarded as follows:

1	2	3	4	5	6	7	8	9	10	PP	FL
25	18	15	12	10	8	6	4	2	1	1	1

Pos	Driver	LEC1 (France)		EST (Portugal)		SPA (Belgium)		LEC2 (France)		HUN (Hungary)		SIL (United Kingdom)		MNZ (Italy)		JER (Spain)		CAT (Spain)		Pts
1	(United Kingdom) Harrison Scott	4	1	1	1	2	1	1	1	9	1	1	1	1	1	1	1			340
2	(Russia) Nikita Troitskiy	3	2	Ret	2	4	6	2	2	3	2	5	5	2	6	3	2	4	2	222
3	(Canada) Devlin DeFrancesco	7	6	12	5	3	2	Ret	5	8	Ret	2	2	7	Ret	2	3	1	5	172
4	(India) Ameya Vaidyanathan	11	5	2	10	1	4	3	4	Ret	6	4	8	5	Ret	4	19	2	3	169
5	(Germany) Jannes Fittje	2	4	4	4	12	7	4	3	5	Ret	11	3	3	2	5	4	7	7	159
6	(Finland) Simo Laaksonen	Ret	10	Ret	6	7	14	14	10	2	4	Ret	11	4	3	6	6	11	8	100
7	(Brazil) Thiago Vivacqua	5	3	Ret	3	5	3	8	7	1	7	10	7	18	Ret	Ret	12	10	10	98
8	(Poland) Alex Karkosik			10	Ret	8	Ret	6	8	13	5	3	6	11	4	7	7	3	9	98
9	(Brazil) Matheus Iorio	13	11	3	9	Ret	5	9	Ret	Ret	9	7	Ret	15	7	10	18	8	Ret	52
10	(Romania) Petru Florescu	Ret	7	6	7	9	8	7	6	7	Ret	Ret	12	Ret	13	Ret	10	13	11	45
11	(United Kingdom) Ben Hingeley											6	4	6	5	8	17	Ret	12	44
12	(Spain) Eliseo Martínez	8	8	5	12	10	15	5	9	11	11	9	14	8	9	9	5	14	13	44
13	(South Africa) Raoul Hyman									4	3									28
14	(India) Tarun Reddy			Ret	8	6	9	Ret	11	6	10	Ret	15	9	Ret	13	9	Ret	Ret	26
15	(United States) Cameron Das											8	Ret	10	8	11	8	Ret	14	13
16	(Brazil) Christian Hahn	Ret	12	7	11	14	12	15	12	12	8	Ret	10	14	11	15	11	15	18	11
17	(Brazil) Guilherme Samaia											14	Ret	Ret	10	12	13	9	16	7
18	(Italy) Lodovico Laurini	10	13	8	Ret	16	13	13	16	14	12	13	9	Ret	Ret	Ret	14	17	17	6
19	(Brazil) Pedro Cardoso	6	15	Ret	13	11	Ret	10	14	10	14	12	13	17	16	Ret	20	12	15	3
20	(Spain) Javier Cobián	12	9	9	15															2
21	(Ukraine) Aleksey Chuklin	9	Ret			15	10	12	15											1
22	(Russia) Daniil Pronenko	Ret	Ret	Ret	Ret	13	11	11	13	15	13	WD	WD	13	14	14	15	16	19	0
23	(Russia) Yan Leon Shlom	1	Ret	11	Ret									12	12					0
24	(Malaysia) Najiy Razak			Ret	14															0
25	(China) Daniel Lu													16	15	Ret	16			0
Guest drivers ineligible to score points
	(Brazil) Felipe Drugovich																	6	1	0
	(Australia) Joey Mawson																	Ret	4	0
	(Italy) Lorenzo Colombo																	5	6	0
Non-championship round-only drivers
	(Thailand) Kane Shepherd	Ret	14																	0
Pos	Driver	LEC1 (France)		EST (Portugal)		SPA (Belgium)		LEC2 (France)		HUN (Hungary)		SIL (United Kingdom)		MNZ (Italy)		JER (Spain)		CAT (Spain)		Pts

==== Rookies' championship ====
- Points were awarded as follows:

1	2	3	4	5
10	8	6	4	3

Pos	Driver	LEC1 (France)		EST (Portugal)		SPA (Belgium)		LEC2 (France)		HUN (Hungary)		SIL (United Kingdom)		MNZ (Italy)		JER (Spain)		CAT (Spain)		Pts
1	(Russia) Nikita Troitskiy	3	2	Ret	2	4	6	2	2	3	2	5	5	2	6	3	2	4	2	124
2	(Germany) Jannes Fittje	2	4	4	4	12	7	4	3	5	Ret	11	3	3	2	5	4	7	7	95
3	(Canada) Devlin DeFrancesco	7	6	12	5	3	2	Ret	5	8	Ret	2	2	7	Ret	2	3	1	5	92
4	(Finland) Simo Laaksonen	Ret	10	Ret	6	7	14	14	10	2	4	Ret	11	4	3	6	6	11	8	54
5	(Poland) Alex Karkosik			10	Ret	8	Ret	6	8	13	5	3	6	11	4	7	7	3	9	37
6	(Spain) Eliseo Martínez	8	8	5	12	10	15	5	9	11	11	9	14	8	9	9	5	14	13	31
7	(Romania) Petru Florescu	Ret	7	6	7	9	8	7	6	7	Ret	Ret	12	Ret	13	Ret	10	13	11	22
8	(India) Tarun Reddy			Ret	8	6	9	Ret	11	6	10	Ret	15	9	Ret	13	9	Ret	Ret	17
9	(Italy) Lodovico Laurini	10	13	8	Ret	16	13	13	16	14	12	13	9	Ret	Ret	Ret	14	17	17	7
10	(Spain) Javier Cobián	12	9	9	15															3
11	(Russia) Yan Leon Shlom	1	Ret	11	Ret									12	12					0
12	(Malaysia) Najiy Razak			Ret	14															0
13	(China) Daniel Lu													16	15	Ret	16			0
Non-championship round-only drivers
	(Thailand) Kane Shepherd	Ret	14																	0
Pos	Driver	LEC1 (France)		EST (Portugal)		SPA (Belgium)		LEC2 (France)		HUN (Hungary)		SIL (United Kingdom)		MNZ (Italy)		JER (Spain)		CAT (Spain)		Pts

==== Teams' championship ====
- Points were awarded as follows:

1	2	3	4	5
10	8	6	4	3

Pos	Team	LEC1 (France)		EST (Portugal)		SPA (Belgium)		LEC2 (France)		HUN (Hungary)		SIL (United Kingdom)		MNZ (Italy)		JER (Spain)		CAT (Spain)		Pts
1	(Italy) RP Motorsport	4	1	1	1	2	1	1	1	9	1	1	1	1	1	1	1	3	7	134
2	(United Kingdom) Carlin Motorsport	7	5	2	5	1	2	3	4	6	6	2	2	5	10	2	3	1	3	90
3	(Spain) Drivex School	3	2	7	2	4	6	2	2	3	2	5	5	2	6	3	2	4	2	84
4	(Spain) Campos Racing	5	3	3	3	5	3	7	6	1	3	7	7	4	3	6	6	8	8	50
5	(United Kingdom) Fortec Motorsports	1	4	4	4	12	7	4	3	5	Ret	6	3	6	5	8	10	13	11	30
6	(Spain) Teo Martín Motorsport	6	8	5	12	10	15	5	9	10	11	9	13	8	9	9	5	12	13	9
7	(Italy) BVM Racing	Ret	16	Ret	Ret	13	11	11	13	15	13	WD	WD	13	14	14	15	16	19	0
Pos	Team	LEC1 (France)		EST (Portugal)		SPA (Belgium)		LEC2 (France)		HUN (Hungary)		SIL (United Kingdom)		MNZ (Italy)		JER (Spain)		CAT (Spain)		Pts

=== Spanish Formula 3 Championship ===
==== Drivers' championship ====
- Points were awarded as follows:

1	2	3	4	5	6	7	8	9	10
25	18	15	12	10	8	6	4	2	1

Pos	Driver	EST (Portugal)		JER (Spain)		CAT (Spain)		Pts
1	(Canada) Devlin DeFrancesco	12	5	2	3	1	5	119
2	(India) Ameya Vaidyanathan	2	10	4	19	2	3	97
3	(Finland) Simo Laaksonen	Ret	6	6	6	11	8	70
4	(Spain) Eliseo Martínez	5	12	9	5	14	13	61
5	(Brazil) Thiago Vivacqua	Ret	3	Ret	12	10	10	57
6	(Brazil) Matheus Iorio	3	9	10	18	8	20	57
7	(Romania) Petru Florescu	6	7	Ret	10	13	11	50
8	(India) Tarun Reddy	Ret	8	13	9	Ret	21	31
9	(Russia) Daniil Pronenko	Ret	Ret	14	15	16	19	18
10	(Brazil) Pedro Cardoso	Ret	13	Ret	20	12	15	17
11	(Spain) Javier Cobián	9	15					11
Guest drivers ineligible to score points
	(United Kingdom) Harrison Scott	1	1	1	1			0
	(Brazil) Felipe Drugovich					6	1	0
	(Russia) Nikita Troitskiy	Ret	2	3	2	4	2	0
	(Poland) Alex Karkosik	10	Ret	7	7	3	9	0
	(Germany) Jannes Fittje	4	4	5	4	7	7	0
	(Australia) Joey Mawson					Ret	4	0
	(Italy) Lorenzo Colombo					5	6	0
	(Brazil) Christian Hahn	7	11	15	11	15	18	0
	(United States) Cameron Das			11	8	Ret	14	0
	(Italy) Lodovico Laurini	8	Ret	Ret	14	17	17	0
	(United Kingdom) Ben Hingeley			8	17	Ret	12	0
	(Russia) Yan Leon Shlom	11	Ret					0
	(Brazil) Guilherme Samaia			12	13	9	16	0
	(Malaysia) Najiy Razak	Ret	14					0
	(China) Daniel Lu			Ret	16			0
Pos	Driver	EST (Portugal)		JER (Spain)		CAT (Spain)		Pts

==== Teams' championship ====
- Points were awarded as follows:

1	2	3	4	5
10	8	6	4	3

Pos	Team	EST (Portugal)		JER (Spain)		CAT (Spain)		Pts
1	(Italy) RP Motorsport	1	1	1	1	3	7	50
2	(United Kingdom) Carlin	2	5	2	3	1	3	43
3	(Spain) Drivex School	7	2	3	2	4	2	36
4	(Spain) Campos Racing	3	3	6	6	8	8	15
5	(United Kingdom) Fortec Motorsports	4	4	8	10	13	11	8
6	(Spain) Teo Martín Motorsport	5	12	9	5	12	13	6
7	(Italy) BVM Racing	Ret	Ret	14	15	16	19	0
