= 2015 BRDC Formula 4 Autumn Trophy =

The 2015 Duo BRDC Formula 4 Autumn Trophy was a two-event motor racing championship for open wheel, formula racing cars held across England, as an off-season trophy to the BRDC Formula 4 Championship. The trophy featured a mix of professional motor racing teams and privately funded drivers, and also featured the debut of the new 2-litre 230-bhp Tatuus-Cosworth single seat race car that will be used from the 2016 BRDC Formula 4 Championship season onwards. The season was run at Snetterton 300 on November 7–8 and at Brands Hatch Indy on November 14–15, in two quadruple-header events.

The Autumn Trophy Champion will receive free entry for the entire 2016 main season, a prize with a monetary value of over £5,000. The runner-up in the championship will be rewarded with 50 per cent off their entry fees for next year, with the third placed overall driver receiving a discount of 25 per cent on their respective entry fees for the 2016 season. The total value of this prize package is worth more than £10,000.

== Teams and drivers ==
All teams were British-registered. Fortec will enter the main BRDC British F3 Championship from 2016 onwards, but made their debut in the 2015 BRDC F4 Autumn Trophy.

Team	No.	Driver	Rounds
HHC Motorsport	3	(United Kingdom) Sennan Fielding	1
HHC Motorsport	11	(United Kingdom) Lando Norris	2
HHC Motorsport	37	(South Africa) Sisa Ngebulana	All
Fortec Motorsport	7	(Oman) Faisal Al Zubair	All
Fortec Motorsport	14	(United Kingdom) Ben Barnicoat	All
Hillspeed	25	(United Kingdom) Struan Moore	1
Hillspeed	51	(India) Ameya Vaidyanathan	1
Douglas Motorsport	45	(United Kingdom) Harrison Scott	All

== Race calendar and results ==
The race calendar consisted of two events, held on consecutive weekends, at the Snetterton 300 and at the Brands Hatch Indy, comprising a total of eight races. The weekend format included a 20-minute qualifying session and two 20 minute races on both Saturday and Sunday. The grid for the first race in each day was set in qualifying order, with starting positions for race two of each day set by the fastest laps from race one.

Round		Circuit	Date	Pole position	Fastest lap	Winning driver	Winning team
1	R1	Snetterton Circuit (300 Circuit, Norfolk)	7 November	(United Kingdom) Harrison Scott	(United Kingdom) Ben Barnicoat	(United Kingdom) Harrison Scott	(United Kingdom) Douglas Motorsport
1	R2	Snetterton Circuit (300 Circuit, Norfolk)	7 November		(United Kingdom) Ben Barnicoat	(United Kingdom) Ben Barnicoat	(United Kingdom) Fortec Motorsport
1	R3	Snetterton Circuit (300 Circuit, Norfolk)	8 November	(United Kingdom) Ben Barnicoat	(United Kingdom) Harrison Scott	(United Kingdom) Sennan Fielding	(United Kingdom) HHC Motorsport
1	R4	Snetterton Circuit (300 Circuit, Norfolk)	8 November		(United Kingdom) Ben Barnicoat	(United Kingdom) Harrison Scott	(United Kingdom) Douglas Motorsport
2	R5	Brands Hatch (Indy Circuit, Kent)	14 November	(United Kingdom) Lando Norris	(United Kingdom) Harrison Scott	(United Kingdom) Lando Norris	(United Kingdom) HHC Motorsport
2	R6	Brands Hatch (Indy Circuit, Kent)	14 November		(United Kingdom) Lando Norris	(United Kingdom) Lando Norris	(United Kingdom) HHC Motorsport
2	R7	Brands Hatch (Indy Circuit, Kent)	15 November	(United Kingdom) Ben Barnicoat	(United Kingdom) Ben Barnicoat	(United Kingdom) Ben Barnicoat	(United Kingdom) Fortec Motorsport
2	R8	Brands Hatch (Indy Circuit, Kent)	15 November		(United Kingdom) Ben Barnicoat	(United Kingdom) Ben Barnicoat	(United Kingdom) Fortec Motorsport

== Championship standings ==
Scoring system

Points are awarded to the top 20 classified finishers in all races.

Position	**1st**	**2nd**	**3rd**	**4th**	**5th**	**6th**	**7th**	**8th**	**9th**	**10th**	**11th**	**12th**	**13th**	**14th**	**15th**	**16th**	**17th**	**18th**	**19th**	**20th**
Points	35	29	24	21	19	17	15	13	12	11	10	9	8	7	6	5	4	3	2	1

=== Autumn Trophy ===
Pos.	Driver	SNE				BRH				Points
1	(United Kingdom) Ben Barnicoat	5	1	**NC**	2	2	2	**1**	1	211
2	(United Kingdom) Harrison Scott	**1**	2	2	1	Ret	3	3	4	197
3	(South Africa) Sisa Ngebulana	2	5	3	Ret	3	4	4	3	162
4	(Oman) Faisal al Zubair	6	6	4	3	4	5	5	5	157
5	(United Kingdom) Lando Norris					**1**	1	2	2	128
6	(United Kingdom) Sennan Fielding	3	7	1	4					95
7	(United Kingdom) Struan Moore	4	3	Ret	DNS					45
8	(India) Ameya Vaidyanathan	Ret	4	Ret	5					40
Pos.	Driver	SNE				BRH				Points

Colour	Result
Gold	Winner
Silver	Second place
Bronze	Third place
Green	Points classification
Blue	Non-points classification
Blue	Non-classified finish (NC)
Purple	Retired, not classified (Ret)
Red	Did not qualify (DNQ)
Red	Did not pre-qualify (DNPQ)
Black	Disqualified (DSQ)
White	Did not start (DNS)
White	Withdrew (WD)
White	Race cancelled (C)
Blank	Did not practice (DNP)
Blank	Did not arrive (DNA)
Blank	Excluded (EX)

**Bold** – Pole
Italics – Fastest Lap
