= Ameya Vaidyanathan =

Indian racing driver

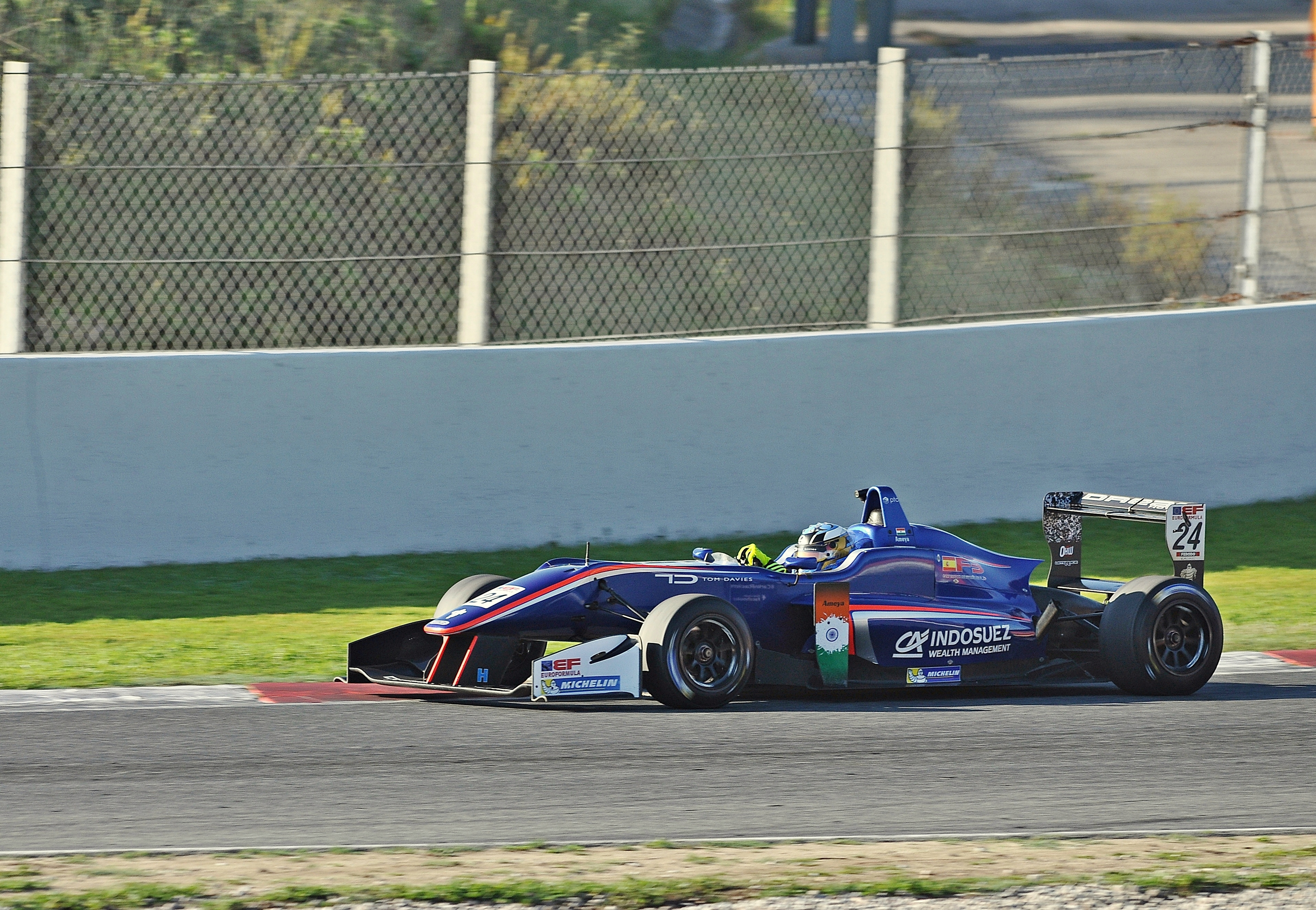
- Nationality: Indian
- Born: 29 July 1996 (age 30) Pune, Maharashtra, India

FIA Formula 3 European Championship
- Years active: 2017–2018
- Teams: Carlin Motorsport
- Starts: 39
- Wins: 0
- Poles: 0
- Fastest laps: 0
- Best finish: NC in 2018

Previous series
- 2015 2015 2015 2016 2016–2017 2017: Formula Renault 2.0 NEC; MSA Formula; BRDC Formula 4 Championship; BRDC British Formula 3 Championship; Euroformula Open Championship; Toyota Racing Series

Ameya Vaidyanathan (born 29 July 1996 in Pune) is an Indian former racing driver. He last competed in the Japanese Formula 3 Championship for B-Max Racing with Motopark.

Vaidyanathan is best known for being involved in a serious crash with Daniel Ticktum during a Formula 3 event at the Norisring in 2018.

== Racing Record ==
=== Career summary ===
Season	Series	Team	Races	Wins	Poles	F/Laps	Podiums	Points	Position
2015	Formula Renault 2.0 NEC	MGR Motorsport	2	0	0	0	0	10	36th
2015	MSA Formula Championship	Joe Tandy Racing	21	0	0	0	0	15	22nd
2015	BRDC Formula 4 Championship	Hillspeed	24	0	0	0	3	217	12th
2015	BRDC Formula 4 Autumn Trophy	Hillspeed	4	0	0	0	0	40	8th
2016	BRDC British Formula 3 Championship	Carlin	15	0	0	0	1	95	22nd
2016	Euroformula Open Championship	Carlin	14	0	0	0	0	26	15th
2017	Toyota Racing Series	MTEC Motorsport	15	0	0	0	0	358	16th
2017	Euroformula Open Championship	Carlin	16	1	1	1	5	169	4th
2017	FIA Formula 3 European Championship	Carlin	9	0	0	0	0	0	22nd
2018	FIA Formula 3 European Championship	Carlin	29	0	0	0	0	0	23rd
2019	Japanese Formula 3 Championship	B-Max Racing with Motopark	20	0	0	0	0	0	13th

=== Complete BRDC Formula 4/Formula 3 Championship results ===
(key) (Races in bold indicate pole position; races in italics indicate fastest lap)

Year	Team	1	2	3	4	5	6	7	8	9	10	11	12	13	14	15	16	17	18	19	20	21	22	23	24	DC	Points
2015	Hillspeed	OUL; 1; 16	OUL; 2 Ret	OUL; 3; 12	ROC; 1; 2	ROC; 2; 17	ROC; 3 Ret	SIL; 1; 13	SIL; 2; 16	SIL; 3; 14	SNE1; 1; 12	SNE1; 2; 9	SNE1; 3; 16	BRH1; 1 Ret	BRH1; 2; 12	BRH1; 3; 14	SNE2; 1; 16	SNE2; 2 Ret	SNE2; 3; 9	DON; 1; 3	DON; 2; 3	DON; 3; 7	BRH2; 1; 11	BRH2; 2; 13	BRH2; 3; 9	12th	217
2016	Carlin	SNE1; 1; 15	SNE1; 2; 18	SNE1; 3; 10	BRH1; 1 Ret	BRH1; 2; 14	BRH1; 3 Ret	ROC; 1; 7	ROC; 2; 2	ROC; 3 Ret	OUL; 1 Ret	OUL; 2; 20	OUL; 3; 18	SIL; 1	SIL; 2	SIL; 3	SPA; 1	SPA; 2	SPA; 3	SNE2; 1; 12	SNE2; 2; 11	SNE2; 3; 14	BRH2; 1	BRH2; 2	BRH2; 3	22nd	95

=== Complete MSA Formula Championship results ===
(key) (Races in bold indicate pole position; races in italics indicate fastest lap)

Year	Team	1	2	3	4	5	6	7	8	9	10	11	12	13	14	15	16	17	18	19	20	21	22	23	24	25	26	27	28	29	30	DC	Points
2015	Joe Tandy Racing	BHI; 1	BHI; 2	BHI; 3	DON; 1; 17	DON; 2; 14	DON; 3; 11	THR; 1 Ret	THR; 2; 17	THR; 3; 15	OUL; 1; 20	OUL; 2 DNS	OUL; 3 Ret	CRO; 1; 12	CRO; 2 Ret	CRO; 3; 17	SNE; 1; 19	SNE; 2 Ret	SNE; 3; 18	KNO; 1	KNO; 2	KNO; 3	ROC; 1; 15	ROC; 2; 10	ROC; 3; 16	SIL; 1	SIL; 2	SIL; 3	BHGP; 1 Ret	BHGP; 2; 16	BHGP; 3; 15	22nd	15

=== Complete Formula Renault 2.0 Northern European Cup results ===
(key) (Races in bold indicate pole position) (Races in italics indicate fastest lap)

Year	Team	1	2	3	4	5	6	7	8	9	10	11	12	13	14	15	16	DC	Points
2015	MGR Motorsport	MNZ; 1	MNZ; 2	SIL; 1	SIL; 2	RBR; 1	RBR; 2	RBR; 3	SPA; 1	SPA; 2	ASS; 1	ASS; 2	NÜR; 1; 16	NÜR; 2; 16	HOC; 1	HOC; 2	HOC; 3	36th	10

=== Complete Euroformula Open Championship results ===
(key) (Races in bold indicate pole position) (Races in italics indicate fastest lap)

Year	Team	1	2	3	4	5	6	7	8	9	10	11	12	13	14	15	16	DC	Points
2016	Carlin	EST; 1; 15	EST; 2; 12	SPA; 1; 15	SPA; 2; 12	LEC; 1; 13	LEC; 2 DNS	SIL; 1 DNS	SIL; 2; 11	RBR; 1; 9	RBR; 2; 7	MNZ; 1; 17	MNZ; 2; 14	JER; 1; 10	JER; 2; 9	CAT; 1; 6	CAT; 2 Ret	15th	26
2017	Carlin	EST; 1; 2	EST; 2; 10	SPA; 1; 1	SPA; 2; 4	LEC; 1; 3	LEC; 2; 4	HUN; 1 Ret	HUN; 2; 6	SIL; 1; 4	SIL; 2; 8	MNZ; 1; 5	MNZ; 2 Ret	JER; 1; 4	JER; 2; 19	CAT; 1; 2	**CAT**; **2**; 3	4th	169

=== Complete Toyota Racing Series results ===
(key) (Races in bold indicate pole position) (Races in italics indicate fastest lap)

Year	Team	1	2	3	4	5	6	7	8	9	10	11	12	13	14	15	DC	Points
2017	MTEC Motorsport	RUA; 1; 13	RUA; 2; 14	RUA; 3 Ret	TER; 1; 15	TER; 2; 11	TER; 3; 19	HMP; 1; 6	HMP; 2; 5	HMP; 3 Ret	TAU; 1; 12	TAU; 2; 17	TAU; 3; 14	MAN; 1; 14	MAN; 2; 14	MAN; 3; 11	16th	358

=== Complete FIA Formula 3 European Championship results ===
(key) (Races in bold indicate pole position) (Races in italics indicate fastest lap)

Year	Entrant	Engine	1	2	3	4	5	6	7	8	9	10	11	12	13	14	15	16	17	18	19	20	21	22	23	24	25	26	27	28	29	30	DC	Points
2017	Carlin	Volkswagen	SIL; 1	SIL; 2	SIL; 3	MNZ; 1	MNZ; 2	MNZ; 3	PAU; 1	PAU; 2	PAU; 3	HUN; 1	HUN; 2	HUN; 3	NOR; 1	NOR; 2	NOR; 3	SPA; 1; 16	SPA; 2; 14	SPA; 3; 15	ZAN; 1; 13	ZAN; 2; 17	ZAN; 3; 18	NÜR; 1; 19	NÜR; 2; 21	NÜR; 3; 18	RBR; 1	RBR; 2	RBR; 3	HOC; 1	HOC; 2	HOC; 3	19th	1
2018	Carlin	Volkswagen	PAU; 1 Ret	PAU; 2; 16	PAU; 3; 16	HUN; 1; 19	HUN; 2; 17	HUN; 3; 18	NOR; 1; 17	NOR; 2 DSQ	NOR; 3 EX	ZAN; 1; 22	ZAN; 2 Ret	ZAN; 3; 20	SPA; 1; 12	SPA; 2; 16	SPA; 3; 22	SIL; 1; 17	SIL; 2; 21	SIL; 3; 18	MIS; 1; 20	MIS; 2; 20	MIS; 3; 16	NÜR; 1; 14	NÜR; 2; 17	NÜR; 3 Ret	RBR; 1; 19	RBR; 2; 15	RBR; 3; 22	HOC; 1; 20	HOC; 2; 18	HOC; 3; 17	23rd	0

=== Complete Japanese Formula 3 Championship results ===
(key) (Races in bold indicate pole position) (Races in italics indicate fastest lap)

Year	Entrant	1	2	3	4	5	6	7	8	9	10	11	12	13	14	15	16	17	18	19	20	Pos	Points
2019	B-Max Racing with Motopark	SUZ; 1 Ret	SUZ; 2; 11	AUT; 1; 9	AUT; 2; 10	AUT; 3; 9	OKA; 1; 8	OKA; 2; 12	OKA; 3; 8	SUG; 1; 9	SUG; 2; 8	FUJ; 1; 9	FUJ; 2; 8	SUG; 1; 10	SUG; 2; 11	SUG; 3; 11	MOT; 1; 8	MOT; 2; 10	MOT; 3; 12	OKA; 1; 9	OKA; 2; 8	13th	0
