= AV Formula =

(Spain) AVF
- Founded: 2012
- Founder(s): Adrián Vallés
- Base: Barcelona, Spain
- Team principal(s): Adrián Vallés
- Current series: European Le Mans Series; Eurocup Formula Renault 2.0; Formula Renault 2.0 NEC
- Former series: Formula Renault 2.0 Alps; Formula Renault 3.5 Series
- Drivers' Championships: Formula V8 3.5: 2016: Tom Dillmann

AVF formerly AV Formula, was a Spanish motor racing team, run by former racing driver Adrián Vallés.

== History ==
After retiring from racing, Vallés formed his own team at the end of 2012, under the name Av Formula. In October 2012 the team began by competing in the two final rounds of the Formula Renault 2.0 Alps, with Tatiana Calderón, Denis Nagulin, Egor Orudzhev, Emanuele Zonzini as drivers. Zonzini brought the highest-place finish to the team on the thirteenth place. AV Formula took over the Team RFR's entry in Formula Renault 3.5 Series in 2013. The team signed Yann Cunha and Arthur Pic for their debut season in Formula Renault 3.5. AV Formula ended season with the ninth place in the teams' standings and a single podium at the home circuit Alcañiz scored by Pic. Also in 2013 the team decided to concentrate on the Formula Renault 2.0 NEC with Fran Rueda as regular driver.

== Results ==
=== Formula Renault 3.5 Series ===
Formula Renault 3.5 Series
Year	Car	Drivers	Races	Wins	Poles	F/Laps	Podiums	Points	D.C.	T.C.
2013	Dallara T12-Zytek	(France) Arthur Pic	17	0	0	1	1	74	8th	9th
2013	Dallara T12-Zytek	(Brazil) Yann Cunha	17	0	0	0	0	0	27th	9th
2014	Dallara T12-Zytek	(Switzerland) Zoël Amberg	17	0	0	1	1	66	11th	7th
2014	Dallara T12-Zytek	(Netherlands) Beitske Visser	17	0	0	0	0	11	21st	7th
2015	Dallara T12-Zytek	(Mexico) Alfonso Celis Jr.	17	0	0	2	0	17	16th	10th
2015	Dallara T12-Zytek	(Netherlands) Beitske Visser	15	0	0	0	0	3	23rd	10th

=== Formula V8 3.5 ===
Formula V8 3.5
Year	Car	Drivers	Races	Wins	Poles	F/Laps	Podiums	Points	D.C.	T.C.
2016	Dallara T12-Zytek	(France) Tom Dillmann	18	2	5	2	12	237	1st	3rd
2016	Dallara T12-Zytek	(Mexico) Alfonso Celis Jr.	20	0	0	0	1	55	11th	3rd
2017	Dallara T12-Zytek	(Portugal) Henrique Chaves	2	1	0	1	1	35	13th	6th
2017	Dallara T12-Zytek	(Russia) Matevos Isaakyan	18	2	1	4	8	215	2nd	2nd
2017	Dallara T12-Zytek	(Russia) Egor Orudzhev	16	2	1	2	10	198	6th	2nd
2017	Dallara T12-Zytek	(Russia) Konstantin Tereshchenko†	18	0	0	0	1	94	8th	2nd

† Tereshchenko drove for Teo Martín Motorsport until round 8.

=== Eurocup Formula Renault 2.0 ===
Eurocup Formula Renault 2.0
Year	Car	Drivers	Races	Wins	Poles	F/Laps	Podiums	Points	D.C.	T.C.
2013	Tatuus–Renault	(France) Victor Sendin	2	0	0	0	0	0	NC	NC
2013	Tatuus–Renault	(New Zealand) Nick Cassidy	2	0	0	0	0	0	NC	NC
2014	Tatuus–Renault	(Netherlands) Roy Geerts	2	0	0	0	0	0	26th	11th
2014	Tatuus–Renault	(Czech Republic) Josef Záruba	4	0	0	0	0	0	28th	11th
2014	Tatuus–Renault	(France) Jules Gounon	2	0	0	0	0	0	30th	11th
2014	Tatuus–Renault	(Spain) Iñigo Bikuña	2	0	0	0	0	0	29th	11th
2014	Tatuus–Renault	(Switzerland) Louis Delétraz	6	0	0	0	0	0	NC	11th
2014	Tatuus–Renault	(United Kingdom) Matthew Graham	6	0	0	0	0	1	22nd	11th
2015	Tatuus–Renault	(United Kingdom) Harrison Scott	17	0	0	0	1	45	12th	8th
2015	Tatuus–Renault	(United Kingdom) Matthew Graham	3	0	0	0	0	2	20th	8th
2015	Tatuus–Renault	(Republic of Ireland) Charlie Eastwood	10	0	0	0	0	0	25th	8th
2015	Tatuus–Renault	(Czech Republic) Josef Záruba	4	0	0	0	0	0	NC	8th
2015	Tatuus–Renault	(Portugal) Henrique Chaves	7	0	0	0	0	0	NC	8th
2015	Tatuus–Renault	(Russia) Denis Bulatov	5	0	0	0	0	0	NC	8th
2016	Tatuus–Renault	(Portugal) Henrique Chaves	15	0	0	0	0	41	11th	4th
2016	Tatuus–Renault	(United Kingdom) Harrison Scott	15	3	2	0	6	172	4th	4th
2016	Tatuus–Renault	(Russia) Nerses Isaakyan	6	0	0	0	0	0	NC	4th
2016	Tatuus–Renault	(Russia) Nikita Mazepin	4	0	0	0	0	11	16th	4th
2016	Tatuus–Renault	(Romania) Petru Florescu	4	0	0	0	0	0	21st	4th
2016	Tatuus–Renault	(Poland) Julia Pankiewicz	3	0	0	0	0	0	NC	4th
2017	Tatuus–Renault	(Portugal) Henrique Chaves	13	0	0	0	1	42	10th	7th
2017	Tatuus–Renault	(Peru) Rodrigo Pflucker	8	0	0	0	0	0	28th	7th
2017	Tatuus–Renault	(Mexico) Axel Matus	13	0	0	0	0	0	23rd	7th
2017	Tatuus–Renault	(Switzerland) Grégoire Saucy	8	0	0	0	0	0	26th	7th
2017	Tatuus–Renault	(Australia) Thomas Randle	5	0	0	0	0	3	20th	7th
2017	Tatuus–Renault	(Spain) Xavier Lloveras								7th

=== Formula Renault 2.0 NEC ===
Formula Renault 2.0 NEC
Year	Car	Drivers	Races	Wins	Poles	F.L.	Podiums	Points	D.C.	T.C.
2013	Barazi-Epsilon–Renault	(Spain) Fran Rueda	16	0	0	0	0	56	24th	N/A
2013	Barazi-Epsilon–Renault	(France) Victor Sendin	7	0	0	0	0	62	21st	N/A
2013	Barazi-Epsilon–Renault	(Poland) Aleksander Bosak	7	0	0	0	0	15	39th	N/A
2014	Barazi-Epsilon–Renault	(Netherlands) Roy Geerts	15	0	0	0	0	73	21st	7th
2014	Barazi-Epsilon–Renault	(Czech Republic) Josef Záruba	15	0	1	0	1	107	16th	7th
2014	Barazi-Epsilon–Renault	(United Kingdom) Matthew Graham	15	0	0	0	0	119	12th	7th
2014	Barazi-Epsilon–Renault	(South Africa) Nicholas Surguladze	4	0	0	0	0	4	41st	7th
2014	Barazi-Epsilon–Renault	(Spain) Inigo Bikuna	8	0	0	0	0	5	39th	7th
2014	Barazi-Epsilon–Renault	(France) Jules Gounon	10	0	0	0	0	54	23rd	7th
2015	Barazi-Epsilon–Renault	(Czech Republic) Josef Záruba	15	0	0	0	0	133.5	10th	4th
2015	Barazi-Epsilon–Renault	(Portugal) Henrique Chaves	15	0	0	0	0	101	13th	4th
2015	Barazi-Epsilon–Renault	(Netherlands) Roy Geerts	2	0	0	0	0	9	37th	4th
2015	Barazi-Epsilon–Renault	(Spain) Iñigo Bikuña	6	0	0	0	0	9	38th	4th
2015	Barazi-Epsilon–Renault	(Republic of Ireland) Charlie Eastwood	11	0	0	0	0	76	17th	4th
2015	Barazi-Epsilon–Renault	(United Kingdom) Harrison Scott	4	0	0	0	0	61	20th	4th
2015	Barazi-Epsilon–Renault	(Czech Republic) Bronislav Formánek	2	0	0	0	0	0	42nd	4th
2015	Barazi-Epsilon–Renault	(Japan) Nobuharu Matsushita	3	0	0	0	0	0	NC	4th
2015	Barazi-Epsilon–Renault	(Russia) Denis Bulatov	3	0	0	0	0	46	22nd	4th
2016	Barazi-Epsilon–Renault	(Portugal) Henrique Chaves	15	0	0	0	0	106	15th	8th
2016	Barazi-Epsilon–Renault	(Russia) Nerses Isaakyan	15	0	0	0	0	66	21st	8th
2016	Barazi-Epsilon–Renault	(Poland) Julia Pankiewicz	15	0	0	0	0	17	27th	8th
