= Harrison Scott =

British racing driver (born 1996)

- Nationality: (United Kingdom) British
- Born: 5 March 1996 (age 30) Althorne, Essex, England

Euroformula Open Championship career
- Debut season: 2016
- Current team: RP Motorsport
- Car number: 10
- Former teams: Teo Martín Motorsport, RP Motorsport
- Starts: 16
- Wins: 12
- Poles: 11
- Fastest laps: 9
- Best finish: 1st in 2017

Previous series
- 2015-16 2013-14: Eurocup Formula Renault 2.0; British Formula Ford Championship

Championship titles
- 2017: Euroformula Open Championship

Harrison Scott (born 5 March 1996) is a British racing driver who serves as a simulator driver for Williams Racing in Formula One. Scott was Euroformula Open champion in 2017, and a race winner in Pro Mazda for RP Motorsport.

== Career ==
=== Karting ===
Born in Althorne, Scott began karting in 2005 at the age of nine. Throughout his seven-year career, he took the British Karting title and two third places in the World and European Cups.

=== Formula 4 ===
In 2013, Scott graduated to single-seaters, partaking in British Formula Ford with Falcon Motorsport in the Scholarship class. He took six wins, across two seasons, and finished vice-champion in the standings on both occasions.

=== Eurocup Formula Renault 2.0 ===
In 2015, Scott moved up to Eurocup Formula Renault 2.0 with AVF and finished twelfth in his first season. He remained with the team for the following season and took two poles and three victories to finish fourth in the standings.

=== Euroformula Open ===
In 2017, Scott joined RP Motorsport in Euroformula Open Championship. He dominated the season winning twelve from fourteen races that he had contested.

=== Pro Mazda ===
Scott would continue his career in North America, where he entered the 2018 Pro Mazda Championship with RP Motorsport.

=== Formula 1 ===
As of 2022, Scott is employed by Williams F1 as a simulator driver.

== Racing record ==
=== Career summary ===
Season	Series	Team	Races	Wins	Poles	F/Laps	Podiums	Points	Position
2013	British Formula Ford Championship	Falcon Motorsport	30	1	1	2	16	634	**2nd**
2014	British Formula Ford Championship	Falcon Motorsport	30	5	6	4	23	711	**2nd**
2015	Eurocup Formula Renault 2.0	AVF	17	0	0	0	1	45	12th
2015	Formula Renault 2.0 NEC	AVF	4	0	0	0	0	61	20th
2015	BRDC Formula 4 Autumn Trophy	Douglas Motorsport	8	2	1	2	6	197	**2nd**
2016	Eurocup Formula Renault 2.0	AVF	15	3	2	0	6	172	4th
2016	BRDC British Formula 3 Championship	HHC Motorsport	8	0	0	0	2	130	17th
2016	Euroformula Open Championship	Teo Martín Motorsport	2	0	0	0	1	0	NC†
2016	Spanish Formula 3 Championship	Teo Martín Motorsport	2	0	0	0	1	0	NC†
2017	Euroformula Open Championship	RP Motorsport	14	12	11	9	13	340	**1st**
2017	Spanish Formula 3 Championship	RP Motorsport	4	4	3	3	4	0	NC†
2018	Pro Mazda Championship	RP Motorsport	12	2	1	0	6	223	8th
2018	F3 Asian Championship	Hitech GP	3	0	0	0	0	26	14th
2022	Formula One	Williams Racing	Simulator driver						
2023	Formula One	Williams Racing	Simulator driver						
2024	Formula One	Williams Racing	Simulator driver						
2025	Formula One	Atlassian Williams Racing	Simulator driver						
2026	Formula One	Atlassian Williams F1 Team	Simulator driver						

^{†} As Scott was a guest driver, he was ineligible for championship points.

=== Complete Eurocup Formula Renault 2.0 results ===
(key) (Races in bold indicate pole position; races in italics indicate fastest lap)

Year	Entrant	1	2	3	4	5	6	7	8	9	10	11	12	13	14	15	16	17	DC	Points
2015	AVF	ALC; 1; 12	ALC; 2; 11	ALC; 3; 8	SPA; 1; 12	SPA; 2; 12	HUN; 1; 7	HUN; 2; 5	SIL; 1; 2	SIL; 2; 24†	SIL; 3 Ret	NÜR; 1; 25	NÜR; 2; 10	LMS; 1 DSQ	LMS; 2; 10	JER; 1; 10	JER; 2; 11	JER; 3; 8	12th	45
2016	AVF	ALC; 1 Ret	ALC; 2; 14	ALC; 3; 15	**MON**; **1**; 1	MNZ; 1; 4	MNZ; 2; 3	MNZ; 3; 8	RBR; 1; 13	RBR; 2; 10	LEC; 1; 6	LEC; 2; 5	SPA; 1; 4	SPA; 2; 4	EST; 1; 7	**EST**; **2**; 1			4th	172

=== Complete Formula Renault 2.0 NEC results ===
(key) (Races in bold indicate pole position) (Races in italics indicate fastest lap)

Year	Entrant	1	2	3	4	5	6	7	8	9	10	11	12	13	14	15	16	DC	Points
2015	AVF	MNZ; 1	MNZ; 2	SIL; 1; 6	SIL; 2; 6	RBR; 1	RBR; 2	RBR; 3	SPA; 1	SPA; 2	ASS; 1; 6	ASS; 2; 5	NÜR; 1	NÜR; 2	HOC; 1	HOC; 2	HOC; 3	20th	61

=== Complete Euroformula Open Championship results ===
(key) (Races in bold indicate pole position) (Races in italics indicate fastest lap)

Year	Entrant	1	2	3	4	5	6	7	8	9	10	11	12	13	14	15	16	Pos	Points
2016	Teo Martín Motorsport	EST; 1	EST; 2	SPA; 1	SPA; 2	LEC; 1	LEC; 2	SIL; 1	SIL; 2	RBR; 1	RBR; 2	MNZ; 1	MNZ; 2	JER; 1; 4	JER; 2; 3	CAT; 1	CAT; 2	NC†	0†
2017	RP Motorsport	**EST**; **1**; 1	EST; 2; 1	**SPA**; **1**; 2	SPA; 2; 1	**LEC**; **1**; 1	**LEC**; **2**; 1	HUN; 1; 9	**HUN**; **2**; 1	**SIL**; **1**; 1	**SIL**; **2**; 1	**MNZ**; **1**; 1	**MNZ**; **2**; 1	**JER**; **1**; 1	**JER**; **2**; 1	CAT; 1	CAT; 2	1st	340

=== Complete Pro Mazda Championship results ===
Year	Team	1	2	3	4	5	6	7	8	9	10	11	12	13	14	15	16	Rank	Points
2018	RP Motorsport	STP; 9	STP; 12	BAR; 2	BAR; 1	IMS; 1	IMS; 12	LOR; 12	RDA; 3	RDA; 3	TOR; 13	TOR; 14	MOH	MOH	**GMP**; 3	POR	POR	8th	223

Sporting positions
Preceded by Leonardo Pulcini	Euroformula Open Championship; Champion; 2017	Succeeded by Felipe Drugovich
