= 2015 Eurocup Formula Renault 2.0 =

Motor racing competition

The 2015 Eurocup Formula Renault 2.0 season was a multi-event motor racing championship for open wheel, formula racing cars held across Europe. The championship featured drivers competing in 2 litre Formula Renault single seat race cars that conform to the technical regulations for the championship. The 2015 season was the 25th Eurocup Formula Renault 2.0 season organized by Renault Sport. The season began at Ciudad del Motor de Aragón on 25 April and finished on 18 October at Circuito de Jerez. The series formed part of the World Series by Renault meetings, with seventeen races at seven race meetings. The championship was won by British driver Jack Aitken.

== Teams and drivers ==
Team	No.	Driver name	Status	Rounds
(Finland) Koiranen GP	1	(Australia) Anton de Pasquale	R	1–5
(Finland) Koiranen GP	2	(United Kingdom) Jake Hughes		All
(Finland) Koiranen GP	3	(United Kingdom) Jack Aitken		All
(Finland) Koiranen GP	40	(Brazil) Bruno Baptista	R	1–2
(Finland) Koiranen GP	43	(Germany) Philip Hamprecht		2
(Finland) Koiranen GP	44	(Austria) Stefan Riener		2, 5
(Finland) Koiranen GP	56	(United Kingdom) Dan Ticktum	R	5
(United Kingdom) Fortec Motorsports	5	(Croatia) Martin Kodrić		All
(United Kingdom) Fortec Motorsports	6	(United Kingdom) Ben Barnicoat		All
(United Kingdom) Fortec Motorsports	7	(South Africa) Callan O'Keeffe		1–5
(United Kingdom) Fortec Motorsports	8	(Canada) Luke Chudleigh		1–2
(United Kingdom) Fortec Motorsports	8	(France) Valentin Hasse-Clot	R	4–6
(United Kingdom) Fortec Motorsports	41	(Canada) Zachary Claman DeMelo	R	1
(United Kingdom) Fortec Motorsports	45	(Austria) Ferdinand Habsburg	R	2, 4–5
(United Kingdom) Fortec Motorsports	54	(India) Jehan Daruvala	R	4–5, 7
(France) ART Junior Team	9	(Japan) Ukyo Sasahara		All
(France) ART Junior Team	10	(Switzerland) Darius Oskoui	R	All
(France) ART Junior Team	49	(Belgium) Max Defourny	R	2, 5, 7
(France) ART Junior Team	53	(United Kingdom) Will Palmer	R	4
(Germany) Josef Kaufmann Racing	14	(Switzerland) Louis Delétraz		All
(Germany) Josef Kaufmann Racing	15	(Switzerland) Kevin Jörg		All
(Germany) Josef Kaufmann Racing	47	(Russia) Nikita Mazepin	R	2–4
(Germany) Josef Kaufmann Racing	55	(Belgium) Dries Vanthoor	R	5
(Netherlands) Manor MP Motorsport	17	(Norway) Dennis Olsen		All
(Netherlands) Manor MP Motorsport	18	(Denmark) Lasse Sørensen	R	1–3
(Netherlands) Manor MP Motorsport	18	(Brazil) Bruno Baptista	R	5–7
(Netherlands) Manor MP Motorsport	19	(Italy) Ignazio D'Agosto		All
(Netherlands) Manor MP Motorsport	46	(France) Valentin Hasse-Clot	R	2–3
(Netherlands) Manor MP Motorsport	46	(Australia) Christopher Anthony		5–6
(France) Tech 1 Racing	20	(Switzerland) Hugo de Sadeleer		All
(France) Tech 1 Racing	21	(France) Simon Gachet		All
(France) Tech 1 Racing	22	(France) Anthoine Hubert		All
(France) ARTA Engineering	25	(France) Amaury Richard	R	All
(France) ARTA Engineering	26	(Australia) James Allen		All
(Spain) AVF	27	(United Kingdom) Harrison Scott	R	All
(Spain) AVF	28	(United Kingdom) Matthew Graham		1
(Spain) AVF	28	(Republic of Ireland) Charlie Eastwood	R	2–4
(Spain) AVF	28	(Czech Republic) Josef Záruba		5
(Spain) AVF	42	(Portugal) Henrique Chaves	R	1–2, 5
(Spain) AVF	50	(Czech Republic) Josef Záruba		2
(Spain) AVF	58	(Russia) Denis Bulatov		6–7
(United Kingdom) Strakka Racing	31	(Republic of Ireland) Charlie Eastwood	R	1
(United Kingdom) Strakka Racing	32	(France) Valentin Hasse-Clot	R	1
(Italy) JD Motorsport	35	(Russia) Matevos Isaakyan		All
(Italy) JD Motorsport	36	(Brazil) Thiago Vivacqua	R	All
(Italy) JD Motorsport	37	(Belgium) Amaury Bonduel	R	1–3
(Italy) JD Motorsport	37	(Russia) Nikita Troitskiy	R	5–6
(Italy) JD Motorsport	37	(Russia) Aleksey Korneev	R	7
(Italy) BVM	48	(Ukraine) Danylo Pronenko		2, 5, 7
(Italy) Cram Motorsport	51	(Russia) Vasily Romanov		3, 5, 7
(Italy) Cram Motorsport	52	(Italy) Matteo Ferrer		4
(Sweden) Prizma Motorsport	57	(Sweden) Pontus Fredricsson	R	5
(Italy) GSK Grand Prix	59	(France) Julien Falchero		7

Icon	Legend
R	Rookie

== Race calendar and results ==
The calendar for the 2015 season was announced on 20 October 2014, on the final day of the 2014 season. The championship returned to Silverstone and Le Mans, replacing rounds at Moscow Raceway and Paul Ricard. Three of the season's seven meetings were held as a triple-header format, amassing to a total of seventeen races. On 11 February 2015, it was announced that the Silverstone round would be moved back a week due to the circuit reacquiring the rights to host the British round of the 2015 MotoGP season.

Round		Circuit	Country	Date	Pole position	Fastest lap	Winning driver	Winning team
1	R1	Ciudad del Motor de Aragón, Alcañiz	Spain	25 April	(Switzerland) Louis Delétraz	(Switzerland) Louis Delétraz	(Switzerland) Louis Delétraz	(Germany) Josef Kaufmann Racing
1	R2	Ciudad del Motor de Aragón, Alcañiz	Spain	25 April	(Switzerland) Louis Delétraz	(Switzerland) Kevin Jörg	(Switzerland) Louis Delétraz	(Germany) Josef Kaufmann Racing
1	R3	Ciudad del Motor de Aragón, Alcañiz	Spain	26 April	(Norway) Dennis Olsen	(Italy) Ignazio D'Agosto	(Norway) Dennis Olsen	(Netherlands) Manor MP Motorsport
2	R1	Circuit de Spa-Francorchamps, Spa	Belgium	30 May	(United Kingdom) Jake Hughes	(Russia) Matevos Isaakyan	(Japan) Ukyo Sasahara	(France) ART Junior Team
2	R2	Circuit de Spa-Francorchamps, Spa	Belgium	31 May	(Japan) Ukyo Sasahara	(Russia) Matevos Isaakyan	(United Kingdom) Jake Hughes	(Finland) Koiranen GP
3	R1	Hungaroring, Budapest	Hungary	13 June	(Switzerland) Louis Delétraz	(Switzerland) Louis Delétraz	(United Kingdom) Jack Aitken	(Finland) Koiranen GP
3	R2	Hungaroring, Budapest	Hungary	14 June	(Switzerland) Louis Delétraz	(Switzerland) Kevin Jörg	(Switzerland) Louis Delétraz	(Germany) Josef Kaufmann Racing
4	R1	Silverstone Circuit	United Kingdom	5 September	(United Kingdom) Jack Aitken	(Switzerland) Louis Delétraz	(United Kingdom) Jack Aitken	(Finland) Koiranen GP
4	R2	Silverstone Circuit	United Kingdom	5 September	(United Kingdom) Jack Aitken	(France) Anthoine Hubert	(Switzerland) Kevin Jörg	(Germany) Josef Kaufmann Racing
4	R3	Silverstone Circuit	United Kingdom	6 September	(France) Anthoine Hubert	(France) Simon Gachet	(France) Anthoine Hubert	(France) Tech 1 Racing
5	R1	Nürburgring, Nürburg	Germany	12 September	(Switzerland) Louis Delétraz	(Belgium) Max Defourny	(United Kingdom) Jack Aitken	(Finland) Koiranen GP
5	R2	Nürburgring, Nürburg	Germany	13 September	(United Kingdom) Ben Barnicoat	(United Kingdom) Jack Aitken	(United Kingdom) Ben Barnicoat	(United Kingdom) Fortec Motorsports
6	R1	Bugatti Circuit, Le Mans	France	26 September	(Switzerland) Kevin Jörg	(United Kingdom) Ben Barnicoat	(United Kingdom) Ben Barnicoat	(United Kingdom) Fortec Motorsports
6	R2	Bugatti Circuit, Le Mans	France	27 September	(France) Anthoine Hubert	(Croatia) Martin Kodrić	(France) Anthoine Hubert	(France) Tech 1 Racing
7	R1	Circuito de Jerez, Jerez de la Frontera	Spain	17 October	(United Kingdom) Jack Aitken	(United Kingdom) Jack Aitken	(United Kingdom) Jack Aitken	(Finland) Koiranen GP
7	R2	Circuito de Jerez, Jerez de la Frontera	Spain	17 October	(United Kingdom) Jack Aitken	(United Kingdom) Jack Aitken	(United Kingdom) Jack Aitken	(Finland) Koiranen GP
7	R3	Circuito de Jerez, Jerez de la Frontera	Spain	18 October	(United Kingdom) Ben Barnicoat	(France) Anthoine Hubert	(United Kingdom) Ben Barnicoat	(United Kingdom) Fortec Motorsports

== Championship standings ==
Points system

Points were awarded to the top 10 classified finishers.

Position	**1st**	**2nd**	**3rd**	**4th**	**5th**	**6th**	**7th**	**8th**	**9th**	**10th**
Points	25	18	15	12	10	8	6	4	2	1

=== Drivers' Championship ===
Pos	Driver	ARA (Spain)			SPA (Belgium)		HUN (Hungary)		SIL (United Kingdom)			NÜR (Germany)		LMS (France)		JER (Spain)			Pts
Pos	Driver	1	2	3	4	5	6	7	8	9	10	11	12	13	14	15	16	17	Pts
1	(United Kingdom) Jack Aitken	10	8	Ret	Ret	7	1	4	**1**	**2**	4	1	6	4	6	**1**	**1**	16	206
2	(Switzerland) Louis Delétraz	**1**	**1**	6	4	Ret	**3**	**1**	9	8	6	**6**	4	3	8	4	5	6	193
3	(Switzerland) Kevin Jörg	5	2	7	13	8	4	2	4	1	2	8	5	**2**	7	2	4	24	193
4	(United Kingdom) Ben Barnicoat	2	5	Ret	25†	4	2	8	Ret	23†	13	4	**1**	1	5	22	3	**1**	174
5	(France) Anthoine Hubert	3	6	2	3	6	Ret	6	14	9	**1**	11	3	6	**1**	7	Ret	2	172
6	(United Kingdom) Jake Hughes	8	7	13	**2**	1	6	3	3	3	5	5	7	Ret	15	5	7	4	160
7	(Japan) Ukyo Sasahara	11	17	Ret	1	**2**	Ret	12	12	4	3	2	8	5	9	9	16	5	116
8	(Norway) Dennis Olsen	6	3	**1**	10	29	14	13	6	6	8	10	Ret	7	2	21	8	10	101
9	(Italy) Ignazio D'Agosto	7	9	Ret	5	5	Ret	19	13	Ret	Ret	Ret	9	8	4	3	2	3	94
10	(Russia) Matevos Isaakyan	4	4	9	6	3	19	10	16	16	14	3	12	21	Ret	6	6	7	87
11	(Croatia) Martin Kodrić	13	18	Ret	19	13	5	11	7	11	12	9	2	10	13	8	9	9	47
12	(United Kingdom) Harrison Scott	12	11	8	12	12	7	5	2	24†	Ret	25	10	DSQ	10	10	11	8	45
13	(Switzerland) Darius Oskoui	17	Ret	3	11	19	9	9	5	7	17	12	18	13	14	Ret	14	23	36
14	(South Africa) Callan O'Keeffe	Ret	12	4	7	9	12	Ret	8	10	7	15	13						31
15	(Brazil) Thiago Vivacqua	Ret	Ret	17	8	10	11	7	11	5	10	13	20	16	11	13	10	11	25
16	(France) Simon Gachet	9	Ret	19	Ret	Ret	10	Ret	18	15	11	14	16	11	3	20	21	17	19
17	(Australia) James Allen	25	20	5	21	28	20	18	22	22	22	24	26	20	18	12	Ret	Ret	10
18	(Australia) Anton de Pasquale	21	15	20	Ret	20	8	Ret	17	21	19	17	14						4
19	(France) Valentin Hasse-Clot	19	14	Ret	Ret	Ret	Ret	20†	23	18	23	Ret	28	9	12	Ret	Ret	19	2
20	(United Kingdom) Matthew Graham	15	10	10															2
21	(Belgium) Amaury Bonduel	22	22	11	18	25	18	16											0
22	(France) Amaury Richard	18	Ret	14	14	23	Ret	17	19	19	20	28	21	12	16	Ret	12	21	0
23	(Canada) Luke Chudleigh	16	24†	12	17	21													0
24	(Switzerland) Hugo de Sadeleer	27†	16	21	Ret	Ret	13	Ret	24	20	Ret	Ret	24	15	17	17	17	13	0
25	(Republic of Ireland) Charlie Eastwood	14	13	Ret	22	18	16	15	15	14	15								0
26	(Denmark) Lasse Sørensen	20	21	Ret	15	15	Ret	Ret											0
Guest drivers ineligible for points
	(India) Jehan Daruvala								Ret	DNS	16	7	Ret			15	13	Ret	
	(United Kingdom) Will Palmer								10	13	9								
	(Belgium) Max Defourny				9	11						22	15			Ret	19	12	
	(United Kingdom) Dan Ticktum											16	11						
	(Russia) Aleksey Korneev															11	Ret	20	
	(Russia) Nikita Mazepin				24	14	17	14	20	12	18								
	(Ukraine) Danylo Pronenko				20	22						26	25			14	Ret	14	
	(Brazil) Bruno Baptista	23	23†	15	23	27						27	17	14	DNS	Ret	Ret	18	
	(Russia) Denis Bulatov													18	19	16	15	15	
	(Russia) Vasily Romanov						15	Ret				20	Ret			19	20	Ret	
	(Austria) Stefan Riener				Ret	16						23	19						
	(Portugal) Henrique Chaves	26	19	16	Ret	24						Ret	30						
	(Germany) Philip Hamprecht				16	26													
	(Austria) Ferdinand Habsburg				26†	17			Ret	DNS	DNS	18	23						
	(Italy) Matteo Ferrer								21	17	21								
	(Russia) Nikita Troitskiy											21	31	17	NC				
	(France) Julien Falchero															18	18	22	
	(Canada) Zachary Claman DeMelo	24	Ret	18															
	(Australia) Christopher Anthony											30	32	19	20				
	(Belgium) Dries Vanthoor											19	22						
	(Czech Republic) Josef Záruba				Ret	Ret						Ret	27						
	(Sweden) Pontus Fredricsson											29	29						
Pos	Driver	ARA (Spain)			SPA (Belgium)		HUN (Hungary)		SIL (United Kingdom)			NÜR (Germany)		LMS (France)		JER (Spain)			Pts

Colour	Result
Gold	Winner
Silver	Second place
Bronze	Third place
Green	Points classification
Blue	Non-points classification
Blue	Non-classified finish (NC)
Purple	Retired, not classified (Ret)
Red	Did not qualify (DNQ)
Red	Did not pre-qualify (DNPQ)
Black	Disqualified (DSQ)
White	Did not start (DNS)
White	Withdrew (WD)
White	Race cancelled (C)
Blank	Did not practice (DNP)
Blank	Did not arrive (DNA)
Blank	Excluded (EX)

**Bold** – Pole
Italics – Fastest Lap

Rookie

=== Teams' Championship ===
Pos	Team	Points
1	(Germany) Josef Kaufmann Racing	386
2	(Finland) Koiranen GP	366
3	(United Kingdom) Fortec Motorsports	202
4	(Netherlands) Manor MP Motorsport	195
5	(France) Tech 1 Racing	191
6	(France) ART Junior Team	152
7	(Italy) JD Motorsport	112
8	(Spain) AVF	47
9	(France) ARTA Engineering	10

== Season summary ==
The start of the season saw Swiss driver Louis Delétraz taking the championship leadership after two victories at the season opener in Aragon and one in the Hungaroring. He arrived to the season finale still ahead on points, with other seven drivers also able to become champion: Swiss Kevin Jörg, British Jack Aitken, French Anthoine Hubert, British Jake Hughes, Japanese Ukyo Sasahara, Norwegian Dennis Olsen, and British Ben Barnicoat. Aitken (previously winner in the Hungaroring, Silverstone and the Nürburgring) won the two first races at the final race meeting in Jerez, securing the championship, while Delétraz ended as championship runner-up. German team Josef Kaufmann Racing was the teams' champion.
