= Patrik Pasma =

Finnish racing driver

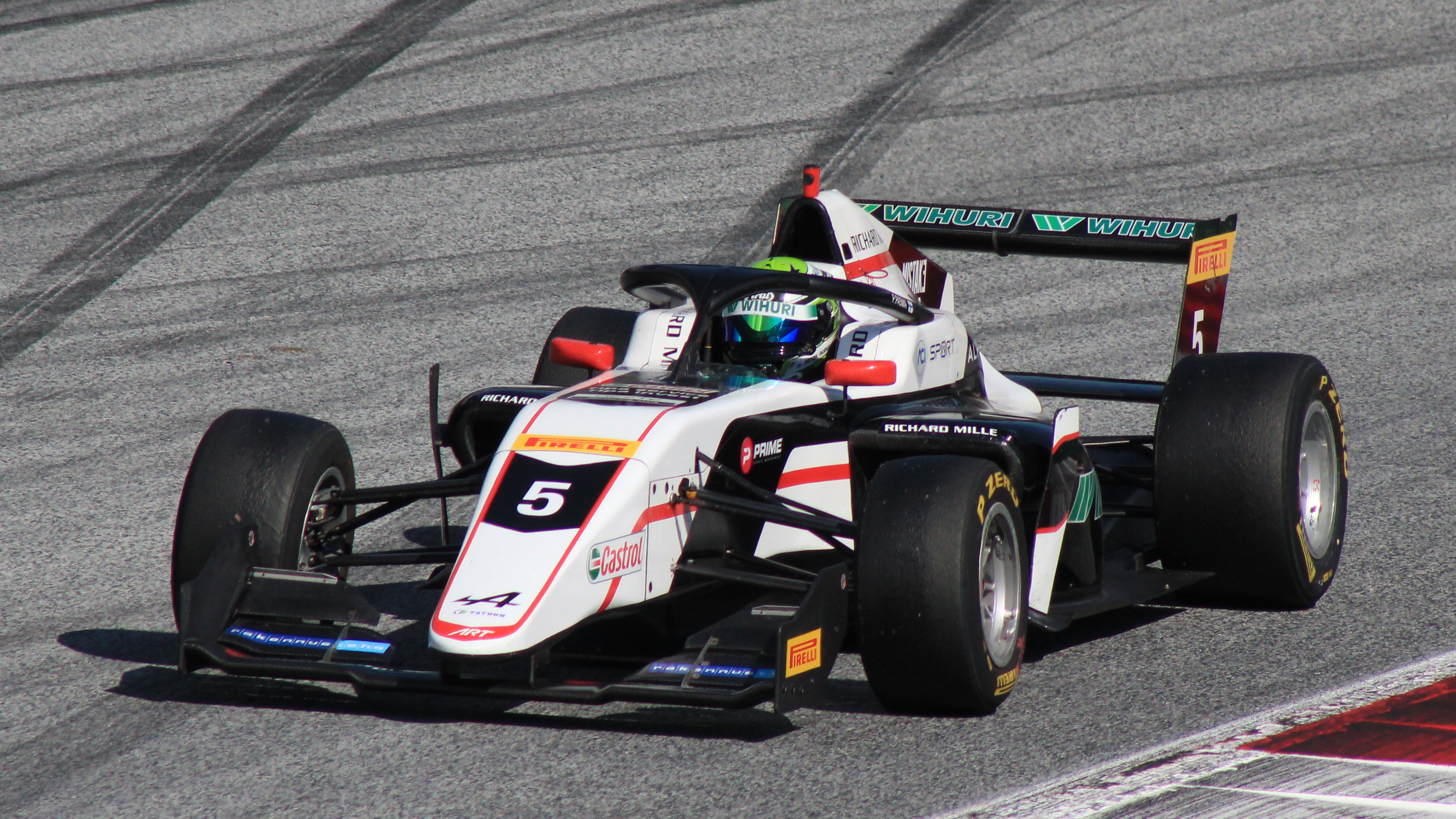
- Pasma in 2021
- Nationality: (Finland) Finnish
- Born: Patrik Antero Pasma; 2 March 2000 (age 26) Oulu, Finland

FR European Championship career
- Debut season: 2020
- Current team: ART Grand Prix
- Car number: 5
- Former teams: KIC Motorsport
- Best finish: 4th in 2020

Previous series
- 2016 2016 2017-18 2017-18 2018-19 2019: Finnish Formula Ford; Avon Tyres Formula Ford 1600; F4 British Championship; Formula 4 UAE Championship; MRF Challenge; Formula Renault Eurocup

Patrik Antero Pasma (born 2 March 2000) is a Finnish racing driver. He last competed for Evans GP in the Formula Regional Asian Championship.

== Career ==
=== Formula Ford ===
Pasma started his single seater career in an array of different Formula Ford categories, mostly in the UK but some in his home country Finland. The Walter Hayes Trophy, Finnish Formula Ford Junior Championship, Champion of Brands and Marcel Albers Memorial Trophy were some of the categories he races in. Pasma's best result was a second place finish in the Marcel Albers Memorial Trophy held at Circuit Zandvoort, he finished behind Irishman Stephen Daly.

=== British F4 ===
Pasma signed up for his first season in British F4 in 2017 for Carlin alongside Jamie Caroline, Logan Sargeant and Lucas Alecco Roy. Five points finishes along with two podiums saw Pasma have a successful start to the season. However, an extremely serious car crash occurred with Pasma and JHR Developments driver Billy Monger on lap 4 of the third race at Donington Park. Pasma slowed along the Schwantz Curve that left Monger unsighted and caused him to slam into the back of the Carlin. Monger reported hearing Pasma screaming in the cockpit. Monger almost died in the crash, but Pasma was not seriously injured. After a long extraction process to get both drivers out of the cars, it was announced the crash meant Monger had both of his legs amputated while Pasma stayed in the hospital overnight for examinations. He was released without serious injuries. Pasma returned for the next round at Thruxton where he finished 13th in the first race and seventh in the two following, a couple more podiums and a handful of points scoring races saw Pasma end the season in eighth place.

Pasma returned for the 2018 season but jumping ship to Arden International this year. The season got off to an okay start as he battled Johnathan Hoggard for the lead of the second race and crossed the line second to get his first podium of the year, however both himself and Hoggard jumped the start, meaning they finished fifth and sixth respectively, Sebastian Priaulx took the victory. His first podium eventually came as he once again battled Johnathan Hoggard who beat him off the line from pole in the final race at Donington, a safety car caused late pressure from Kiern Jewiss however, Pasma crossed the line second. Pasma won the first race of his career at the first race Rockingham where he dominated the field getting Pole, the fastest lap and the race victory ahead of Red Bull duo Hauger and Doohan. Pasma finished the season with two wins, eleven podiums and 315 which placed him in 6th position.

=== MRF Challenge ===
Pasma was the only Finn on the grid in 2018-19 for the MRF Challenge. For the second time that weekend, Pasma took reverse grid pole at the fourth race in Dubai to which he converted into his first of three wins, Belgian Max Defourny put pressure on Pasma but fell short by half a second in the end. Pasma finished on the podium at least one in all three rounds, the most being three podiums in Bahrain, where he stepped on every step of the podium. Pasma fell short of the title by 94 points, three time W Series champion Jamie Chadwick won the title, followed by Defourny.

=== Formula Renault Eurocup ===
For 2019, Pasma moved into the Formula Renault Eurocup with Arden. Partnering Frank Bird and Sebastián Fernández, Pasma scored a sole podium at the Nürburgring and ended up eleventh in the standings.

=== Formula Regional ===
==== 2020 ====
Pasma switched to KIC Motorsport to race in the Formula Regional European Championship in 2020. After a relatively weak first half of the season in which he had only managed to achieve one podium finish, Pasma came alive in the second half and took four race wins, climbing to fourth in the standings and being the highest-placed driver to not have driven for the Prema Powerteam.

==== 2021 ====
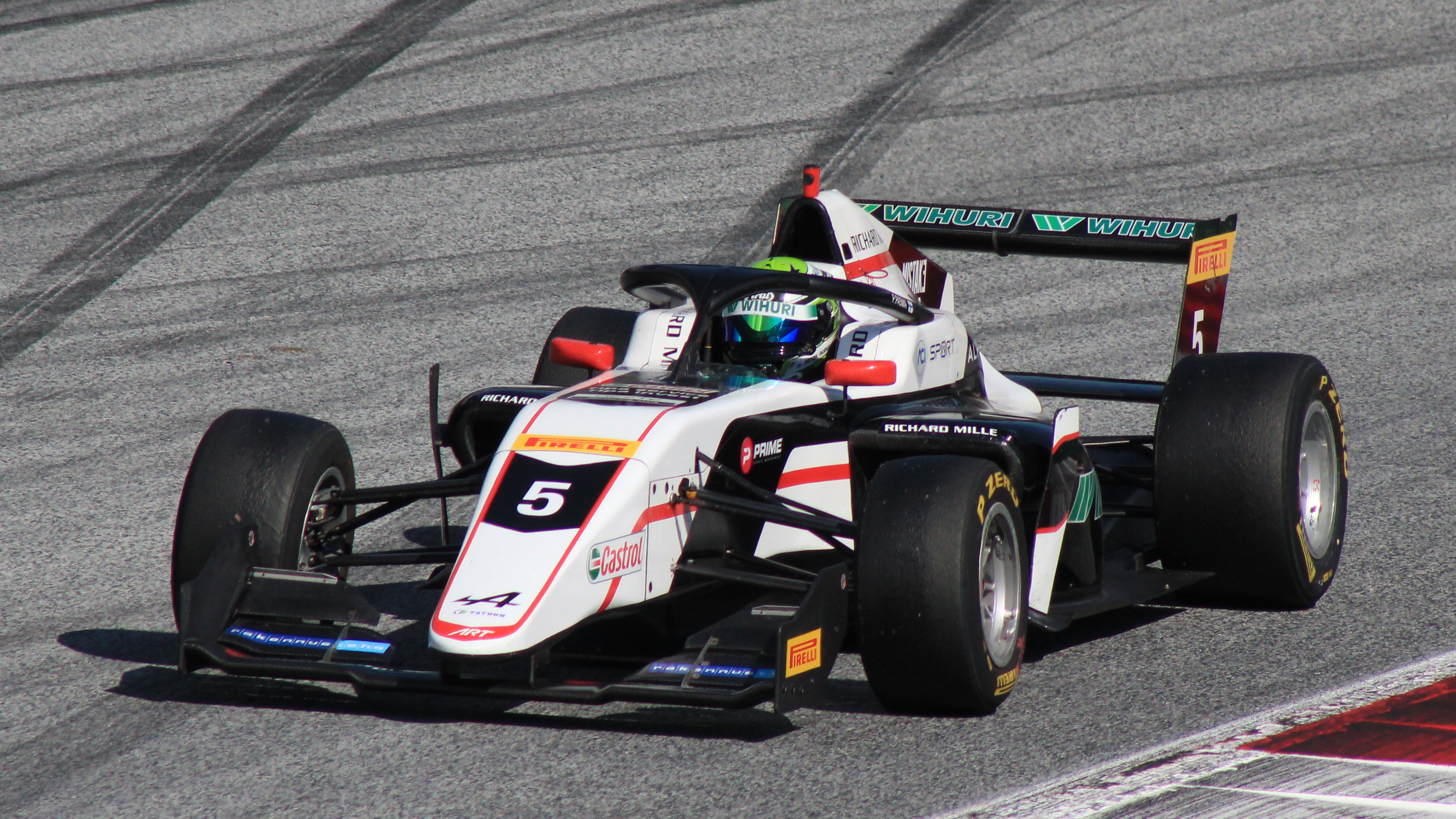
Pasma at the Red Bull Ring in 2021

At the beginning of 2021, Pasma took part in the F3 Asian winter series with Evans GP. Following another sub-par first half of the year, he experienced a streak of five podiums in the final five races, which included two victories, which promoted him up to fourth in the standings.

Pasma remained with KIC in Formula Regional European for 2021. However, after Thomas ten Brinke's surprise retirement from racing following the round at Circuit Zandvoort, Pasma replaced the Dutchman at ART Grand Prix. He finished twelfth in the standings, having experienced mixed fortunes with both teams.

==== 2022 ====
In the winter of 2022, Pasma returned to Evans GP to race in the final three rounds of Formula Regional Asia. He won the reversed-grid race at the Dubai Autodrome in the penultimate round and ended the campaign in eleventh.

=== FIA Formula 3 Championship ===
Pasma made his Formula 3 debut in March 2022, when he took part in the pre-season test with Jenzer Motorsport.

== Karting record ==
=== Karting career summary ===
Season	Series	Team	Position
2011	Finnish Cup — Raket		5th
2012	Finnish Challenge — KF6		4th
2012	Finnish Cup — Raket		10th
2013	Finnish Championship — KFJ		14th
2013	WSK Euro Series — KFJ	Kohtala Sports	42nd
2013	NEZ Championship — KFJ	ART GP Finland	5th
2013	CIK-FIA European Championship — KFJ	MGM Racing	50th
2013	WSK Final Cup — KFJ	Kosmic Racing Departement	34th
2013	CIK-FIA World Championship — KFJ	Kosmic Racing Departement	32nd
2014	South Garda Winter Cup — KFJ		26th
2014	WSK Champions Cup — KFJ	ART Grand Prix Finland	57th
2014	WSK Super Master Series — KFJ	ART Grand Prix Finland	36th
2014	Finnish Championship — KFJ		3rd
2014	CIK-FIA European Championship — KFJ	ART Grand Prix Finland	48th
2014	CIK-FIA World Championship — KFJ	ART Grand Prix Finland	52nd
2015	Finnish Cup Championship — KFJ		6th
2015	South Garda Winter Cup — KF	Strakka Bhaitech	25th
2015	WSK Super Master Series — KF	Strakka Bhaitech	50th
2015	CIK-FIA European Championship — KF	Strakka Bhaitech	NC

== Racing record ==
=== Racing career summary ===
Season	Series	Team	Races	Wins	Poles	F/Laps	Podiums	Points	Position
2016	Champion of Brands	N/A	1	0	0	0	0	N/A	NC
2016	Finnish Formula Ford	N/A	3	0	0	0	1	21	8th
2016	Walter Hayes Trophy	N/A	3	0	0	0	0	N/A	26th
2016	Marcel Albers Memorial Trophy	N/A	1	0	0	0	1	N/A	**2nd**
2016	Formula Ford 1600 National Championship	N/A	16	0	0	1	1	168	7th
2016	Formula Ford Festival	N/A	3	0	0	0	1	N/A	11th
2016	Super Series Formula Ford	N/A	1	0	0	0	0	N/A	NC
2017	F4 British Championship	Carlin	30	0	0	2	4	167.5	8th
2017–18	Formula 4 UAE Championship	Silberpfeil Energy Dubai	4	0	0	0	0	32	15th
2018	F4 British Championship	TRS Arden Junior Racing Team	30	2	5	2	11	315	6th
2018–19	MRF Challenge Formula 2000 Championship	MRF Racing	14	3	2	2	5	186	**3rd**
2019	Formula Renault Eurocup	Arden	20	0	0	0	1	65	10th
2020	Formula Regional European Championship	KIC Motorsport	23	4	2	3	6	290	4th
2021	F3 Asian Championship	Evans GP	15	2	0	1	5	146	4th
2021	Formula Regional European Championship	KIC Motorsport	10	0	0	0	0	56	12th
2021	Formula Regional European Championship	ART Grand Prix	10	0	0	0	0	56	12th
2022	Formula Regional Asian Championship	Evans GP	9	1	0	0	1	63	11th
2022	Formula Regional European Championship	KIC Motorsport	2	0	0	0	0	0	36th

* Season still in progress.

=== Complete F4 British Championship results ===
(key) (Races in bold indicate pole position) (Races in italics indicate fastest lap)

Year	Team	1	2	3	4	5	6	7	8	9	10	11	12	13	14	15	16	17	18	19	20	21	22	23	24	25	26	27	28	29	30	31	Pos	Points
2017	Carlin	BRI; 1; 5	BRI; 2; 2	BRI; 3; 4	DON; 1; 6	DON; 2; 3	DON; 3 Ret	THR; 1; 13	THR; 2; 7	THR; 3; 7	OUL; 1; 4	OUL; 2; 3	OUL; 3 C	CRO; 1; 8	CRO; 2; 6	CRO; 3; 9	SNE; 1; 11	SNE; 2; 9	SNE; 3; 12	KNO; 1 Ret	KNO; 2 Ret	KNO; 3; 10	KNO; 4; 7	ROC; 1; 7	ROC; 2; 2	ROC; 3; 10	SIL; 1; 10	SIL; 2; 8	SIL; 3 Ret	BHGP; 1; 6	BHGP; 2; 16	BHGP; 3; 4	8th	167.5
2018	TRS Arden Junior Racing Team	BRI; 1; 7	BRI; 2; 6	BRI; 3; 8	DON; 1 Ret	DON; 2; 8	**DON**; **3**; 2	THR; 1; 5	THR; 2 Ret	THR; 3; 4	OUL; 1; 3	OUL; 2; 5	OUL; 3; 2	CRO; 1; 3	CRO; 2 Ret	CRO; 3 Ret	SNE; 1; 7	SNE; 2; 5	**SNE**; **3**; 6	**ROC**; **1**; 1	ROC; 2; 4	**ROC**; **3**; 1	KNO; 1; 2	KNO; 2; 3	KNO; 3; 2	SIL; 1; 5	SIL; 2; 2	SIL; 3; 6	BHGP; 1; 4	BHGP; 2; 2	BHGP; 3; 5		6th	315

=== Complete Formula 4 UAE Championship results ===
(key) (Races in bold indicate pole position) (Races in italics indicate fastest lap)

Year	Team	1	2	3	4	5	6	7	8	9	10	11	12	13	14	15	16	17	18	19	20	21	22	23	24	Pos	Points
2017-18	Silberpfeil Energy Dubai	YMC1; 1	YMC1; 2	YMC1; 3	YMC1; 4	YMC2; 1; 4	YMC2; 2 Ret	YMC2; 3; 4	YMC2; 4; 6	DUB1; 1	DUB1; 2	DUB1; 3	DUB1; 4	YMC3; 1	YMC3; 2	YMC3; 3	YMC3; 4	YMC4; 1	YMC4; 2	YMC4; 3	YMC4; 4	DUB2; 1	DUB2; 2	DUB2; 3	DUB2; 4	15th	32

=== Complete MRF Challenge Formula 2000 Championship results ===
(key) (Races in bold indicate pole position) (Races in italics indicate fastest lap)

Year	1	2	3	4	5	6	7	8	9	10	11	12	13	14	15	Pos	Points
2018–19	DUB; 1 Ret	DUB; 2; 8	DUB; 3; 6	DUB; 4; 1	DUB; 5; 4	BHR; 1; 7	BHR; 2; 4	BHR; 3; 3	BHR; 4; 4	BHR; 5 DNS	**CHE**; **1**; 1	CHE; 2; 5	**CHE**; **3**; 1	CHE; 4; 6	CHE; 5; 2	3rd	186

=== Complete Formula Renault Eurocup results ===
(key) (Races in bold indicate pole position) (Races in italics indicate fastest lap)

Year	Team	1	2	3	4	5	6	7	8	9	10	11	12	13	14	15	16	17	18	19	20	Pos	Points
2019	Arden	MNZ; 1; 13	MNZ; 2; 8	SIL; 1; 9	SIL; 2; 16	MON; 1; 7	MON; 2; 10	LEC; 1; 18	LEC; 2; 14	SPA; 1; 6	SPA; 2; 15	NÜR; 1; 2	NÜR; 2; 12	HUN; 1; 7	HUN; 2; 13	CAT; 1; 8	CAT; 2; 15	HOC; 1; 8	HOC; 2; 10	YMC; 1; 7	YMC; 2; 8	10th	65

=== Complete Formula Regional European Championship results ===
(key) (Races in bold indicate pole position) (Races in italics indicate fastest lap)

Year	Team	1	2	3	4	5	6	7	8	9	10	11	12	13	14	15	16	17	18	19	20	21	22	23	24	DC	Points
2020	KIC Motorsport	MIS; 1; 2	MIS; 2; 4	MIS; 3; 5	LEC; 1; 5	LEC; 2; 6	LEC; 3; 5	RBR; 1; 4	RBR; 2; 5	RBR; 3; 6	MUG; 1; 8	MUG; 2; 9	MUG; 3; 4	**MNZ**; **1**; 1	**MNZ**; **2**; 4	MNZ; 3; 1	CAT; 1; 4	CAT; 2; 4	CAT; 3; 8	IMO; 1; 6	IMO; 2; 1	**IMO**; **3**; 1	VLL; 1; 2	VLL; 2 C	VLL; 3; 6	4th	290
2021	KIC Motorsport	IMO; 1; 13	IMO; 2; 16	CAT; 1; 10	CAT; 2; 8	MCO; 1; 5	MCO; 2; 5	LEC; 1; 5	LEC; 2; 7	ZAN; 1 Ret	ZAN; 2; 22															12th	56
2021	ART Grand Prix											SPA; 1; 5	SPA; 2; 11	RBR; 1; 17	RBR; 2; 10	VAL; 1; 33	VAL; 2; 22	MUG; 1; 16	MUG; 2; 18	MNZ; 1; 16	MNZ; 2 Ret					12th	56
2022	KIC Motorsport	MNZ; 1	MNZ; 2	IMO; 1; 24	IMO; 2; 23	MCO; 1	MCO; 2	LEC; 1	LEC; 2	ZAN; 1	ZAN; 2	HUN; 1	HUN; 2	SPA; 1	SPA; 2	RBR; 1	RBR; 2	CAT; 1	CAT; 2	MUG; 1	MUG; 2					36th	0

* Season still in progress.

=== Complete Formula Regional Asian Championship results ===
(key) (Races in bold indicate pole position) (Races in italics indicate fastest lap)

Year	Entrant	1	2	3	4	5	6	7	8	9	10	11	12	13	14	15	DC	Points
2021	Evans GP	DUB; 1; 9	DUB; 2; 10	DUB; 3; 11	ABU; 1; 4	ABU; 2; 6	ABU; 3; 11	ABU; 1 Ret	ABU; 2 Ret	ABU; 3; 5	DUB; 1; 4	DUB; 2; 1	DUB; 3; 3	ABU; 1; 2	ABU; 2; 1	ABU; 3; 2	4th	146
2022	Evans GP	ABU; 1	ABU; 2	ABU; 3	DUB; 1	DUB; 2	DUB; 3	DUB; 1; 13	DUB; 2; 8	DUB; 3; 5	DUB; 1; 9	DUB; 2; 1	DUB; 3; 7	ABU; 1; 7	ABU; 2 Ret	ABU; 3; 5	11th	63
