= 2017 FIA Formula 3 European Championship =

The 2017 FIA Formula 3 European Championship is a multi-event motor racing championship for third-tier single-seat open wheel formula racing cars that is held across Europe. The championship featured drivers competing in two-litre Formula Three racing cars which conform to the technical regulations, or formula, for the championship. It was the sixth edition of the FIA Formula 3 European Championship.

The season saw the début of the Dallara F317 chassis package. Although it was only an aero-upgraded F312 chassis, the F317 was built as a replacement for the aging F312 chassis package which débuted in the first season of the championship back in 2012.

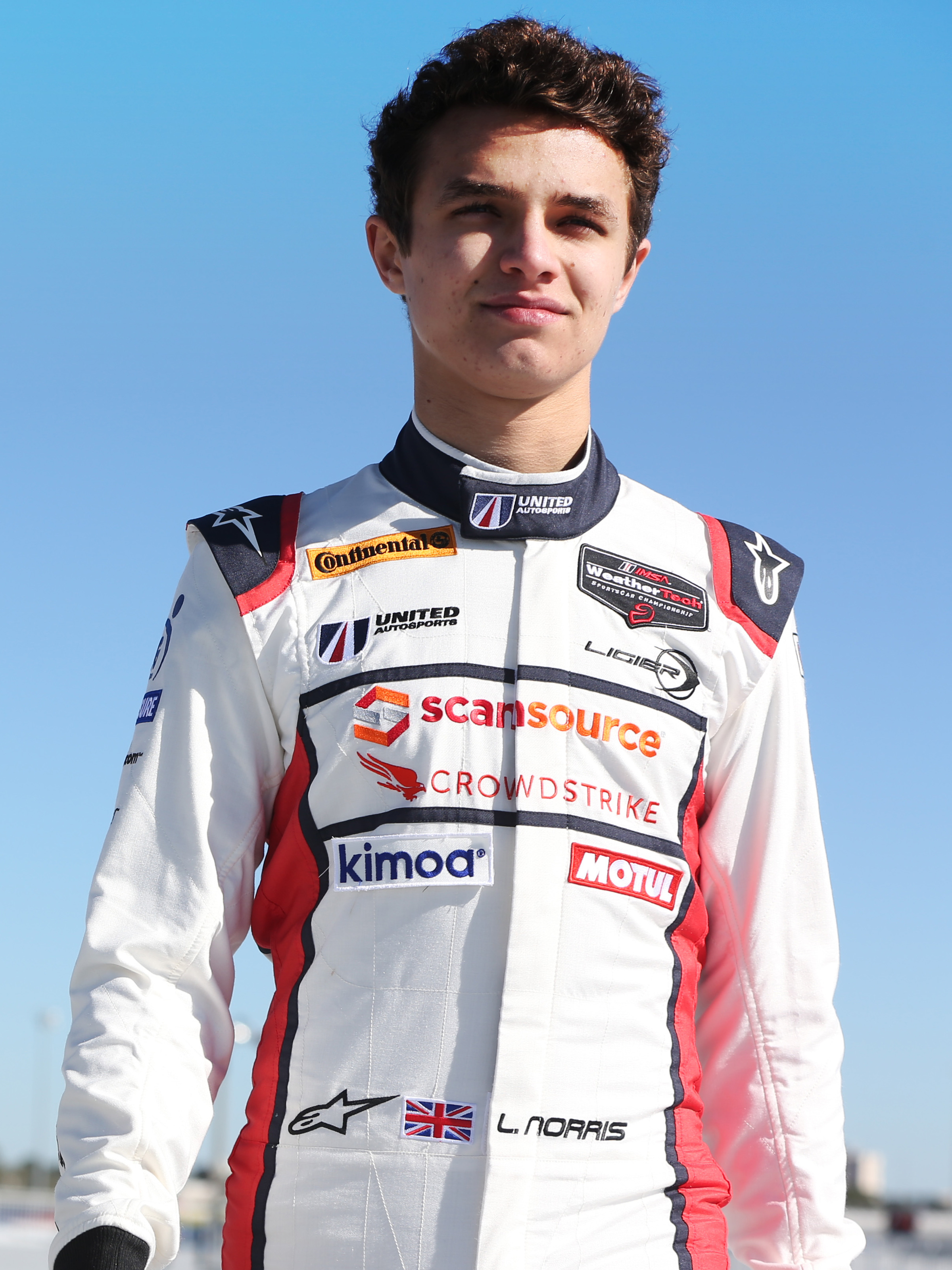
Lando Norris (pictured in 2018), secured the Championship driving for Carlin.

Prema Powerteam successfully defended the teams' championship for the fifth time in a row. The drivers' and rookies' title was secured with two races to spare by Carlin's driver Lando Norris. He became the first non-Prema driver to win the FIA Formula 3 European Championship. Joel Eriksson in his second year with Motopark improved his performance to the runner-up place in the standings. Prema's Maximilian Günther was not able to get better in the championship, but remained in the top-three at the end of the season. His teammate Callum Ilott was the last driver who was a championship contender and won on different types of circuits. Jake Hughes, Jehan Daruvala and Ferdinand Habsburg took their wins at Nürburgring, Norisring and Spa respectively. Guanyu Zhou, Ralf Aron and Nikita Mazepin completed the top-ten in the standings and all of them had more than one podium.

== Teams and drivers ==
The following teams and drivers competed during the 2017 season:

| Team | Chassis (Note: All drivers competed in Dallara chassis; model listed.) | Engine | No. | Driver | Status | Rounds |
|---|---|---|---|---|---|---|
| (Germany) Motopark | F315/007 | Volkswagen | 1 | (Sweden) Joel Eriksson | | All |
| (Germany) Motopark | F315/003 | Volkswagen | 10 | (Romania) Petru Florescu (Note: Ineligible to score points for the team in the teams' championship.) | | 8–9 |
| (Germany) Motopark | F315/003 | Volkswagen | 4 | (Estonia) Jüri Vips | G | 10 |
| (Germany) Motopark | F314/016 | Volkswagen | 33 | (Japan) Marino Sato (Note: Ineligible to score points for the team in the teams' championship at round 1, 4–10.) | R | All |
| (Germany) Motopark | F317/010 | Volkswagen | 47 | (Germany) Keyvan Andres Soori (Note: Ineligible to score points for the team in the teams' championship at rounds 2–10.) | | All |
| (Germany) Motopark | F316/020 | Volkswagen | 55 | (Germany) David Beckmann | | 4–10 |
| (Italy) Prema Powerteam | F316/016 | Mercedes | 3 | (Germany) Maximilian Günther | | All |
| (Italy) Prema Powerteam | F315/004 | Mercedes | 8 | (China) Guanyu Zhou | | All |
| (Italy) Prema Powerteam | F317/003 | Mercedes | 25 | (Germany) Mick Schumacher | R | All |
| (Italy) Prema Powerteam | F314/015 | Mercedes | 53 | (United Kingdom) Callum Ilott | | All |
| (Netherlands) Van Amersfoort Racing | F316/017 | Mercedes | 5 | (Brazil) Pedro Piquet (Note: Ineligible to score points for the team in the teams' championship at rounds 2–5, 7, 9.) | | All |
| (Netherlands) Van Amersfoort Racing | F312/051 | Mercedes | 17 | (United Kingdom) Harrison Newey (Note: Ineligible to score points for the team in the teams' championship at rounds 8, 10.) | | All |
| (Netherlands) Van Amersfoort Racing | F317/005 | Mercedes | 55 | (Germany) David Beckmann | | 1–3 |
| (Netherlands) Van Amersfoort Racing | F317/005 | Mercedes | 15 | (Belgium) Max Defourny | R | 8 |
| (Netherlands) Van Amersfoort Racing | F317/005 | Mercedes | 16 | (Brazil) Felipe Drugovich | G | 10 |
| (Netherlands) Van Amersfoort Racing | F316/010 | Mercedes | 96 | (Australia) Joey Mawson (Note: Ineligible to score points for the team in the teams' championship at rounds 1, 6.) | R | All |
| (United Kingdom) Hitech Grand Prix | F316/019 | Mercedes | 7 | (Estonia) Ralf Aron (Note: Ineligible to score points for the team in the teams' championship at rounds 1–2.) | | All |
| (United Kingdom) Hitech Grand Prix | F317/011 | Mercedes | 11 | (Japan) Tadasuke Makino (Note: Ineligible to score points for the team in the teams' championship at rounds 1, 3–5, 7–10.) | | 1–5, 7–10 |
| (United Kingdom) Hitech Grand Prix | F315/010 | Mercedes | 34 | (United Kingdom) Jake Hughes (Note: Ineligible to score points for the team in the teams' championship at round 4.) | | All |
| (United Kingdom) Hitech Grand Prix | F316/018 | Mercedes | 99 | (Russia) Nikita Mazepin (Note: Ineligible to score points for the team in the teams' championship at rounds 2–3, 5–10.) | | All |
| (United Kingdom) Carlin | F316/014 | Volkswagen | 21 | (United Kingdom) Jake Dennis | | 1–3 |
| (United Kingdom) Carlin | F312/010 | Volkswagen | 21 | (India) Ameya Vaidyanathan | | 6–8 |
| (United Kingdom) Carlin | F312/010 | Volkswagen | 21 | (Canada) Devlin DeFrancesco | G | 9–10 |
| (United Kingdom) Carlin | F315/001 | Volkswagen | 27 | (India) Jehan Daruvala (Note: Ineligible to score points for the team in the teams' championship at rounds 1–5, 7–10.) | R | All |
| (United Kingdom) Carlin | F317/001 | Volkswagen | 31 | (United Kingdom) Lando Norris | R | All |
| (United Kingdom) Carlin | F312/004 | Volkswagen | 37 | (France) Sacha Fenestraz | R | 8 |
| (United Kingdom) Carlin | F316/014 | Volkswagen | 62 | (Austria) Ferdinand Habsburg (Note: Ineligible to score points for the team in the teams' championship at rounds 1–3, 6.) | | All |

| Icon | Legend |
|---|---|
| R | Rookie Cup |
| G | Guest |

=== Driver changes ===
- Force India junior and 2016 Eurocup Formula Renault 2.0 driver Jehan Daruvala and 2016 Euroformula Open runner-up Ferdinand Habsburg joined the series with Carlin. 2016 Formula Renault 2.0 champion Lando Norris, who competed in the last round of the 2016 season with Carlin, raced full-time with the team. 2016 GP3 Series driver Jake Dennis returned to Carlin, with which he previously raced in the championship in 2014. entered the series with Carlin.
- Ralf Aron switched from Prema Powerteam to HitechGP. Jake Hughes, who competed in the final round of the 2016 season with Carlin, will race full-time with Hitech GP. They were joined by 2015 F4 Japanese runner-up Tadasuke Makino.
- Italian F4 driver Marino Sato and Euroformula Open driver Keyvan Andres Soori joined the series with Motopark. Motopark driver Sérgio Sette Câmara stepped up to 2017 FIA Formula 2 Championship with MP Motorsport. Red Bull Junior driver Niko Kari, who finished tenth in the 2016 European Formula 3, competed in the GP3 Series with Arden International.
- Callum Ilott and Guanyu Zhou, who raced for Van Amersfoort Racing and Motopark in 2016 respectively, switched to Prema Powerteam. Mick Schumacher, runner-up in the 2016 ADAC F4 and Italian F4 championships, and son of seven time Formula One world champion Michael Schumacher, joined the series with Prema Powerteam. 2016 champion Lance Stroll graduated to Formula One with Williams F1, leaving his Prema's seat vacant.
- David Beckmann, who competed for Mücke Motorsport in 2016 from round 3 onwards, joined Van Amersfoort Racing. ADAC F4 champion Joey Mawson continued his collaboration with Van Amersfoort Racing. Anthoine Hubert and Mercedes F1 junior driver George Russell, who finished eighth and third in the 2016 European Formula 3 season respectively, joined the GP3 Series with ART Grand Prix.

== Calendar ==
A provisional ten-round calendar was announced on 30 November 2016. The finalised calendar was announced on 16 December 2016.

| R. | RN | Circuit | Date | Supporting |
|---|---|---|---|---|
| 1 | 1 | (United Kingdom) Silverstone Circuit, Silverstone | 14 April | 6 Hours of Silverstone |
| 1 | 2 | (United Kingdom) Silverstone Circuit, Silverstone | 15 April | 6 Hours of Silverstone |
| 1 | 3 | (United Kingdom) Silverstone Circuit, Silverstone | 16 April | 6 Hours of Silverstone |
| 2 | 4 | (Italy) Autodromo Nazionale Monza, Monza | 29 April | WTCC Race of Italy |
| 2 | 5 | (Italy) Autodromo Nazionale Monza, Monza | 30 April | WTCC Race of Italy |
| 2 | 6 | (Italy) Autodromo Nazionale Monza, Monza | 30 April | WTCC Race of Italy |
| 3 | 7 | (France) Circuit de Pau-Ville, Pau | 20 May | Pau Grand Prix |
| 3 | 8 | (France) Circuit de Pau-Ville, Pau | 21 May | Pau Grand Prix |
| 3 | 9 | (France) Circuit de Pau-Ville, Pau | 21 May | Pau Grand Prix |
| 4 | 10 | (Hungary) Hungaroring, Mogyoród | 17 June | Deutsche Tourenwagen Masters |
| 4 | 11 | (Hungary) Hungaroring, Mogyoród | 18 June | Deutsche Tourenwagen Masters |
| 4 | 12 | (Hungary) Hungaroring, Mogyoród | 18 June | Deutsche Tourenwagen Masters |
| 5 | 13 | (Germany) Norisring, Nuremberg | 1 July | Deutsche Tourenwagen Masters |
| 5 | 14 | (Germany) Norisring, Nuremberg | 2 July | Deutsche Tourenwagen Masters |
| 5 | 15 | (Germany) Norisring, Nuremberg | 2 July | Deutsche Tourenwagen Masters |
| 6 | 16 | (Belgium) Circuit de Spa-Francorchamps, Francorchamps | 28 July | Blancpain GT Series Endurance Cup |
| 6 | 17 | (Belgium) Circuit de Spa-Francorchamps, Francorchamps | 28 July | Blancpain GT Series Endurance Cup |
| 6 | 18 | (Belgium) Circuit de Spa-Francorchamps, Francorchamps | 29 July | Blancpain GT Series Endurance Cup |
| 7 | 19 | (Netherlands) Circuit Park Zandvoort, Zandvoort | 19 August | Deutsche Tourenwagen Masters |
| 7 | 20 | (Netherlands) Circuit Park Zandvoort, Zandvoort | 20 August | Deutsche Tourenwagen Masters |
| 7 | 21 | (Netherlands) Circuit Park Zandvoort, Zandvoort | 20 August | Deutsche Tourenwagen Masters |
| 8 | 22 | (Germany) Nürburgring, Rhineland-Palatinate | 9 September | Deutsche Tourenwagen Masters |
| 8 | 23 | (Germany) Nürburgring, Rhineland-Palatinate | 10 September | Deutsche Tourenwagen Masters |
| 8 | 24 | (Germany) Nürburgring, Rhineland-Palatinate | 10 September | Deutsche Tourenwagen Masters |
| 9 | 25 | (Austria) Red Bull Ring, Spielberg | 23 September | Deutsche Tourenwagen Masters |
| 9 | 26 | (Austria) Red Bull Ring, Spielberg | 24 September | Deutsche Tourenwagen Masters |
| 9 | 27 | (Austria) Red Bull Ring, Spielberg | 24 September | Deutsche Tourenwagen Masters |
| 10 | 28 | (Germany) Hockenheimring, Baden-Württemberg | 14 October | Deutsche Tourenwagen Masters |
| 10 | 29 | (Germany) Hockenheimring, Baden-Württemberg | 14 October | Deutsche Tourenwagen Masters |
| 10 | 30 | (Germany) Hockenheimring, Baden-Württemberg | 15 October | Deutsche Tourenwagen Masters |

== Results ==
| Round | | Circuit | Pole position | Fastest lap | Winning driver | Winning team | Rookie winner |
|---|---|---|---|---|---|---|---|
| 1 | R1 | (United Kingdom) Silverstone Circuit | (United Kingdom) Lando Norris | (United Kingdom) Lando Norris | (United Kingdom) Lando Norris | (United Kingdom) Carlin | (United Kingdom) Lando Norris |
| 1 | R2 | (United Kingdom) Silverstone Circuit | (United Kingdom) Callum Ilott | (Sweden) Joel Eriksson | (Sweden) Joel Eriksson | (Germany) Motopark | (Germany) Mick Schumacher |
| 1 | R3 | (United Kingdom) Silverstone Circuit | (United Kingdom) Callum Ilott | (United Kingdom) Callum Ilott | (United Kingdom) Callum Ilott | (Italy) Prema Powerteam | (United Kingdom) Lando Norris |
| 2 | R1 | (Italy) Autodromo Nazionale Monza | (India) Jehan Daruvala | (United Kingdom) Lando Norris | (United Kingdom) Lando Norris | (United Kingdom) Carlin | (United Kingdom) Lando Norris |
| 2 | R2 | (Italy) Autodromo Nazionale Monza | (Sweden) Joel Eriksson | (United Kingdom) Callum Ilott | (Sweden) Joel Eriksson | (Germany) Motopark | (United Kingdom) Lando Norris |
| 2 | R3 | (Italy) Autodromo Nazionale Monza | (Sweden) Joel Eriksson | (Sweden) Joel Eriksson | (United Kingdom) Callum Ilott | (Italy) Prema Powerteam | (United Kingdom) Lando Norris |
| 3 | R1 | (France) Circuit de Pau-Ville | (United Kingdom) Callum Ilott | (United Kingdom) Lando Norris | (Sweden) Joel Eriksson | (Germany) Motopark | (United Kingdom) Lando Norris |
| 3 | R2 | (France) Circuit de Pau-Ville | (United Kingdom) Lando Norris | (Germany) Maximilian Günther | (Germany) Maximilian Günther | (Italy) Prema Powerteam | (United Kingdom) Lando Norris |
| 3 | R3 | (France) Circuit de Pau-Ville | (United Kingdom) Lando Norris | (United Kingdom) Lando Norris | (Germany) Maximilian Günther | (Italy) Prema Powerteam | (India) Jehan Daruvala |
| 4 | R1 | (Hungary) Hungaroring | (Germany) Maximilian Günther | (Austria) Ferdinand Habsburg | (Germany) Maximilian Günther | (Italy) Prema Powerteam | (India) Jehan Daruvala |
| 4 | R2 | (Hungary) Hungaroring | (United Kingdom) Callum Ilott | (United Kingdom) Callum Ilott | (United Kingdom) Callum Ilott | (Italy) Prema Powerteam | (Australia) Joey Mawson |
| 4 | R3 | (Hungary) Hungaroring | (Sweden) Joel Eriksson | (Sweden) Joel Eriksson | (Sweden) Joel Eriksson | (Germany) Motopark | (United Kingdom) Lando Norris |
| 5 | R1 | (Germany) Norisring | (United Kingdom) Jake Hughes | (Estonia) Ralf Aron | (Germany) Maximilian Günther | (Italy) Prema Powerteam | (India) Jehan Daruvala |
| 5 | R2 | (Germany) Norisring | (Estonia) Ralf Aron | (United Kingdom) Callum Ilott | (United Kingdom) Lando Norris | (United Kingdom) Carlin | (United Kingdom) Lando Norris |
| 5 | R3 | (Germany) Norisring | (Germany) Maximilian Günther | (United Kingdom) Callum Ilott | (India) Jehan Daruvala | (United Kingdom) Carlin | (India) Jehan Daruvala |
| 6 | R1 | (Belgium) Circuit de Spa-Francorchamps | (United Kingdom) Lando Norris | (Russia) Nikita Mazepin | (United Kingdom) Lando Norris | (United Kingdom) Carlin | (United Kingdom) Lando Norris |
| 6 | R2 | (Belgium) Circuit de Spa-Francorchamps | (United Kingdom) Lando Norris | (Austria) Ferdinand Habsburg | (Austria) Ferdinand Habsburg | (United Kingdom) Carlin | (India) Jehan Daruvala |
| 6 | R3 | (Belgium) Circuit de Spa-Francorchamps | (United Kingdom) Callum Ilott | (Sweden) Joel Eriksson | (United Kingdom) Lando Norris | (United Kingdom) Carlin | (United Kingdom) Lando Norris |
| 7 | R1 | (Netherlands) Circuit Park Zandvoort | (United Kingdom) Lando Norris | (United Kingdom) Lando Norris | (United Kingdom) Lando Norris | (United Kingdom) Carlin | (United Kingdom) Lando Norris |
| 7 | R2 | (Netherlands) Circuit Park Zandvoort | (United Kingdom) Callum Ilott | (United Kingdom) Callum Ilott | (United Kingdom) Callum Ilott | (Italy) Prema Powerteam | (United Kingdom) Lando Norris |
| 7 | R3 | (Netherlands) Circuit Park Zandvoort | (United Kingdom) Lando Norris | (United Kingdom) Callum Ilott | (United Kingdom) Lando Norris | (United Kingdom) Carlin | (United Kingdom) Lando Norris |
| 8 | R1 | (Germany) Nürburgring | (United Kingdom) Lando Norris | (Belgium) Max Defourny | (United Kingdom) Lando Norris | (United Kingdom) Carlin | (United Kingdom) Lando Norris |
| 8 | R2 | (Germany) Nürburgring | (United Kingdom) Jake Hughes | (United Kingdom) Jake Hughes | (United Kingdom) Jake Hughes | (United Kingdom) Hitech GP | (United Kingdom) Lando Norris |
| 8 | R3 | (Germany) Nürburgring | (United Kingdom) Callum Ilott | (United Kingdom) Lando Norris | (United Kingdom) Lando Norris | (United Kingdom) Carlin | (United Kingdom) Lando Norris |
| 9 | R1 | (Austria) Red Bull Ring | (United Kingdom) Callum Ilott | (United Kingdom) Callum Ilott | (United Kingdom) Callum Ilott | (Italy) Prema Powerteam | (United Kingdom) Lando Norris |
| 9 | R2 | (Austria) Red Bull Ring | (Sweden) Joel Eriksson | (United Kingdom) Lando Norris | (Sweden) Joel Eriksson | (Germany) Motopark | (United Kingdom) Lando Norris |
| 9 | R3 | (Austria) Red Bull Ring | (Sweden) Joel Eriksson | (United Kingdom) Jake Hughes | (Sweden) Joel Eriksson | (Germany) Motopark | (India) Jehan Daruvala |
| 10 | R1 | (Germany) Hockenheimring | (United Kingdom) Callum Ilott | (United Kingdom) Lando Norris | (Sweden) Joel Eriksson | (Germany) Motopark | (United Kingdom) Lando Norris |
| 10 | R2 | (Germany) Hockenheimring | (United Kingdom) Callum Ilott | (United Kingdom) Callum Ilott | (United Kingdom) Callum Ilott | (Italy) Prema Powerteam | (India) Jehan Daruvala |
| 10 | R3 | (Germany) Hockenheimring | (Germany) Maximilian Günther | (Germany) Maximilian Günther | (Germany) Maximilian Günther | (Italy) Prema Powerteam | (United Kingdom) Lando Norris |

== Championship standings ==
Scoring system

| Position | 1st | 2nd | 3rd | 4th | 5th | 6th | 7th | 8th | 9th | 10th |
| Points | 25 | 18 | 15 | 12 | 10 | 8 | 6 | 4 | 2 | 1 |

=== Drivers' championship ===
| Pos. | Driver | SIL (United Kingdom) | | | MNZ (Italy) | | | PAU (France) | | | HUN (Hungary) | | | NOR (Germany) | | | SPA (Belgium) | | | ZAN (Netherlands) | | | NÜR (Germany) | | | RBR (Austria) | | | HOC (Germany) | | | Points |
| Pos. | Driver | R1 | R2 | R3 | R1 | R2 | R3 | R1 | R2 | R3 | R1 | R2 | R3 | R1 | R2 | R3 | R1 | R2 | R3 | R1 | R2 | R3 | R1 | R2 | R3 | R1 | R2 | R3 | R1 | R2 | R3 | Points |
|---|---|---|---|---|---|---|---|---|---|---|---|---|---|---|---|---|---|---|---|---|---|---|---|---|---|---|---|---|---|---|---|---|
| 1 | (United Kingdom) Lando Norris | 1 | 9 | 3 | 1 | 2 | 2 | 2 | 2 | Ret | 8 | 14 | 3 | 11 | 1 | 3 | 1 | Ret | 1 | 1 | 3 | 1 | 1 | 2 | 1 | 4 | 2 | 17 | 2 | 11 | 4 | 441 |
| 2 | (Sweden) Joel Eriksson | 4 | 1 | 2 | 4 | 1 | 4 | 1 | Ret | 5 | 10 | 2 | 1 | 4 | 10 | 7 | 9 | 2 | 2 | 2 | 12 | 12 | 10 | 9 | 8 | 2 | 1 | 1 | 1 | 4 | 2 | 388 |
| 3 | (Germany) Maximilian Günther | 3 | 4 | 4 | 7 | 4 | 3 | 3 | 1 | 1 | 1 | 6 | 6 | 1 | 3 | 2 | 3 | 3 | Ret | 3 | 7 | 3 | 13 | 12 | 7 | 3 | 7 | 5 | 10 | 2 | 1 | 383 |
| 4 | (United Kingdom) Callum Ilott | Ret | 2 | 1 | 9 | 7 | 1 | Ret | 3 | 2 | 5 | 1 | 2 | Ret | 9 | 9 | 14 | 6 | 4 | 5 | 1 | 19 | 4 | 3 | 4 | 1 | 4 | Ret | 4 | 1 | 5 | 344 |
| 5 | (United Kingdom) Jake Hughes | 13 | 3 | 13 | 10 | 13 | Ret | Ret | 6 | Ret | 2 | 4 | 7 | Ret | 2 | 5 | Ret | 4 | Ret | 8 | 2 | 5 | 2 | 1 | 2 | 11 | 13 | 16 | 12 | 5 | 8 | 211 |
| 6 | (India) Jehan Daruvala | 10 | 8 | 6 | 2 | 8 | 9 | 10 | 9 | 11 | 3 | 8 | 9 | 6 | 4 | 1 | 4 | 5 | 5 | 9 | 16 | 14 | 6 | 10 | 5 | 13 | 5 | 6 | 5 | 8 | 20 | 191 |
| 7 | (Austria) Ferdinand Habsburg | 12 | 13 | 12 | 3 | 5 | 5 | 8 | 8 | 6 | 15 | 10 | 12 | Ret | 15 | 8 | 8 | 1 | 6 | 4 | 6 | 2 | 5 | 6 | Ret | 6 | 9 | 4 | 3 | 20 | Ret | 187 |
| 8 | (China) Guanyu Zhou | 7 | 7 | Ret | 5 | 6 | 10 | Ret | Ret | 10 | 7 | 3 | 4 | 3 | 8 | 12 | 12 | 17 | 3 | 16 | 8 | 4 | 9 | 14 | Ret | 9 | 19 | 14 | 13 | 3 | 3 | 149 |
| 9 | (Estonia) Ralf Aron | Ret | 16 | 10 | 8 | 9 | 8 | 5 | 5 | 3 | Ret | 12 | 13 | 9 | 5 | 4 | 11 | 8 | 7 | Ret | 10 | 8 | 14 | 5 | 3 | 12 | 6 | 18 | 8 | 10 | 19 | 123 |
| 10 | (Russia) Nikita Mazepin | Ret | 15 | 7 | 11 | 10 | 11 | 4 | 7 | Ret | 12 | 11 | 10 | 10 | 18 | 10 | 2 | 7 | 11 | 11 | 11 | 10 | Ret | 11 | 16 | Ret | 3 | 2 | 6 | 6 | 7 | 108 |
| 11 | (United Kingdom) Harrison Newey | 6 | 10 | 9 | 17 | Ret | 15 | 6 | 4 | 4 | 6 | 15 | 18 | 5 | 7 | 15 | 7 | 13 | 9 | 10 | 4 | 7 | 12 | 8 | 6 | 19 | 12 | 11 | 14 | 14 | 17 | 106 |
| 12 | (Germany) Mick Schumacher | 8 | 6 | 18 | 6 | 3 | 6 | 9 | 11 | 12 | 9 | 9 | 11 | 7 | 12 | Ret | 6 | 9 | 8 | 6 | 9 | 11 | 8 | 15 | 11 | 7 | 10 | 8 | 11 | 18 | 18 | 94 |
| 13 | (Australia) Joey Mawson | 5 | 11 | 8 | 14 | 16 | Ret | Ret | 16 | Ret | 4 | 7 | 8 | Ret | 13 | 11 | 5 | 10 | 10 | 14 | 14 | 9 | 3 | 7 | 20 | 18 | 8 | 7 | 15 | 15 | 9 | 83 |
| 14 | (Brazil) Pedro Piquet | 9 | 18 | 11 | 16 | Ret | 7 | 7 | 13 | 8 | 17 | 13 | 14 | 2 | 6 | Ret | 10 | 16 | 12 | 7 | Ret | 6 | Ret | 17 | 13 | 10 | 15 | 15 | 7 | 7 | 6 | 80 |
| 15 | (Japan) Tadasuke Makino | 11 | 19 | 15 | 12 | 14 | 13 | 13 | 12 | 7 | 13 | 17 | 17 | 8 | 14 | Ret | | | | Ret | 15 | 16 | 7 | 4 | 19 | 5 | 17 | 3 | 9 | 9 | 11 | 57 |
| 16 | (Germany) David Beckmann | 14 | 17 | 14 | Ret | 15 | 14 | 11 | 14 | Ret | 11 | 5 | 5 | 12 | 11 | 6 | Ret | 15 | 16 | Ret | 5 | 13 | Ret | 16 | 15 | 8 | 11 | 9 | 17 | 13 | 10 | 45 |
| 17 | (United Kingdom) Jake Dennis | 2 | 5 | 5 | Ret | Ret | Ret | Ret | 10 | 9 | | | | | | | | | | | | | | | | | | | | | | 41 |
| 18 | (Belgium) Max Defourny | | | | | | | | | | | | | | | | | | | | | | 11 | 18 | 9 | | | | | | | 2 |
| 19 | (Japan) Marino Sato | 16 | 12 | 17 | 13 | 11 | 12 | 14 | Ret | 13 | 16 | 16 | 15 | 13 | 16 | 13 | 15 | 11 | 14 | 15 | 18 | 17 | 16 | Ret | 12 | 14 | 16 | 10 | 18 | 19 | 16 | 1 |
| 20 | (France) Sacha Fenestraz | | | | | | | | | | | | | | | | | | | | | | 15 | 13 | 10 | | | | | | | 1 |
| 21 | (Germany) Keyvan Andres Soori | 15 | 14 | 16 | 15 | 12 | Ret | 12 | 15 | Ret | 14 | 18 | 16 | 14 | 17 | 14 | 13 | 12 | 13 | 12 | 13 | 15 | 17 | 19 | 14 | 15 | 14 | Ret | 20 | Ret | 14 | 0 |
| 22 | (India) Ameya Vaidyanathan | | | | | | | | | | | | | | | | 16 | 14 | 15 | 13 | 17 | 18 | 19 | 21 | 18 | | | | | | | 0 |
| 23 | (Romania) Petru Florescu | | | | | | | | | | | | | | | | | | | | | | 18 | 20 | 17 | 17 | 18 | 13 | | | | 0 |
Guest drivers ineligible to score points
| | (Estonia) Jüri Vips | | | | | | | | | | | | | | | | | | | | | | | | | | | | 21 | 12 | 12 | 0 |
| | (Canada) Devlin DeFrancesco | | | | | | | | | | | | | | | | | | | | | | | | | 16 | 20 | 12 | 19 | 17 | 14 | 0 |
| | (Brazil) Felipe Drugovich | | | | | | | | | | | | | | | | | | | | | | | | | | | | 16 | 16 | 15 | 0 |
| Pos. | Driver | R1 | R2 | R3 | R1 | R2 | R3 | R1 | R2 | R3 | R1 | R2 | R3 | R1 | R2 | R3 | R1 | R2 | R3 | R1 | R2 | R3 | R1 | R2 | R3 | R1 | R2 | R3 | R1 | R2 | R3 | Points |
| Pos. | Driver | SIL (United Kingdom) | | | MNZ (Italy) | | | PAU (France) | | | HUN (Hungary) | | | NOR (Germany) | | | SPA (Belgium) | | | ZAN (Netherlands) | | | NÜR (Germany) | | | RBR (Austria) | | | HOC (Germany) | | | Points |

=== Rookies' Championship ===
| Pos. | Driver | SIL (United Kingdom) | | | MNZ (Italy) | | | PAU (France) | | | HUN (Hungary) | | | NOR (Germany) | | | SPA (Belgium) | | | ZAN (Netherlands) | | | NÜR (Germany) | | | RBR (Austria) | | | HOC (Germany) | | | Points |
|---|---|---|---|---|---|---|---|---|---|---|---|---|---|---|---|---|---|---|---|---|---|---|---|---|---|---|---|---|---|---|---|---|
| 1 | (United Kingdom) Lando Norris | 1 | 3 | 1 | 1 | 1 | 1 | 1 | 1 | Ret | 3 | 4 | 1 | 3 | 1 | 2 | 1 | Ret | 1 | 1 | 1 | 1 | 1 | 1 | 1 | 1 | 1 | 5 | 1 | 2 | 1 | 628 |
| 2 | (India) Jehan Daruvala | 4 | 2 | 2 | 2 | 3 | 3 | 3 | 2 | 1 | 1 | 2 | 3 | 1 | 2 | 1 | 2 | 1 | 2 | 3 | 4 | 4 | 3 | 3 | 2 | 3 | 2 | 1 | 2 | 1 | 5 | 539 |
| 3 | (Germany) Mick Schumacher | 3 | 1 | 4 | 3 | 2 | 2 | 2 | 3 | 2 | 4 | 3 | 4 | 2 | 3 | Ret | 4 | 2 | 3 | 2 | 2 | 3 | 4 | 5 | 5 | 2 | 4 | 3 | 3 | 4 | 4 | 436 |
| 4 | (Australia) Joey Mawson | 2 | 4 | 3 | 5 | 5 | Ret | Ret | 4 | Ret | 2 | 1 | 2 | Ret | 4 | 3 | 3 | 3 | 4 | 4 | 3 | 2 | 2 | 2 | 7 | 5 | 3 | 2 | 4 | 3 | 2 | 392 |
| 5 | (Japan) Marino Sato | 5 | 5 | 5 | 4 | 4 | 4 | 4 | Ret | 3 | 5 | 5 | 5 | 4 | 5 | 4 | 5 | 4 | 5 | 5 | 5 | 5 | 7 | Ret | 6 | 4 | 5 | 4 | 5 | 5 | 3 | 304 |
| 6 | (Belgium) Max Defourny | | | | | | | | | | | | | | | | | | | | | | 5 | 6 | 3 | | | | | | | 33 |
| 7 | (France) Sacha Fenestraz | | | | | | | | | | | | | | | | | | | | | | 6 | 4 | 4 | | | | | | | 32 |

=== Teams' championship ===
Prior to each round of the championship, two drivers from each team – if applicable – were nominated to score teams' championship points.

| Pos | Team | Points |
|---|---|---|
| 1 | (Italy) Prema Powerteam | 829 |
| 2 | (United Kingdom) Carlin | 702 |
| 3 | (Germany) Motopark | 614 |
| 4 | (United Kingdom) Hitech GP | 463 |
| 5 | (Netherlands) Van Amersfoort Racing | 357 |
