= Jake Hughes =

British racing driver (born 1994)

- Hughes at Silverstone Circuit in 2026.
- Nationality: (United Kingdom) British
- Born: Jake John Hughes; 30 May 1994 (age 32) Birmingham, England

European Le Mans Series career
- Debut season: 2026
- Current team: Algarve Pro Racing
- Categorisation: FIA Gold
- Car number: 25
- Starts: 6
- Wins: 1
- Podiums: 2
- Poles: 0
- Fastest laps: 0
- Best finish: 4th in 2026
- Finished last season: 4th

Formula E career
- Debut season: 2022–23
- Current team: Cupra Kiro
- Car number: 33
- Former teams: Maserati MSG Racing, NEOM McLaren Formula E Team
- Starts: 47
- Wins: 0
- Podiums: 2
- Poles: 4
- Fastest laps: 2
- Best finish: 12th in 2022–23

Previous series
- 2026 2020–22 2019–21 2018, 19–20 2016, 2018 2016–17 2014–15 2014–15 2014 2013: European Le Mans Series; FIA Formula 2 FIA Formula 3 F3 Asian; GP3 Series; FIA F3 European; Formula Renault 2.0 Alps; Eurocup Formula Renault 2.0; Formula Renault 2.0 NEC; BRDC F4

Championship titles
- 2013: BRDC Formula 4 Championship

Jake John Hughes (born 30 May 1994) is a British racing driver who is set to compete in Formula E for Cupra Kiro. He also serves as the simulator driver for McLaren in Formula One.

Hughes made his debut in Formula E in 2023 and has competed with McLaren and Maserati. He is the winner of the inaugural BRDC Formula 4 Championship and has won multiple races at Formula 3.

== Early racing career ==
=== Karting ===
Hughes started his racing career in karting in 2010 at the age of sixteen, finishing eleventh in the Junior Class of the Easykart UK Championship. In 2011, he finished fifth in the Super 1 National Formula KGP Championship. He stayed in the same championship for 2012, improving to fourth in the series standings, whilst also winning the Easykart UK Championship in the Light category.

=== Local championships ===
Hughes made his single-seaters debut in 2012 at Silverstone in the Formula Renault BARC Championship with Antel Motorsport and contested in the Rockingham round of the Formula Renault BARC Winter Series.

For 2013, Hughes decided to move in the newly created BRDC Formula 4 Championship, joining Lanan Racing to partner Daniel Headlam. He took four wins with another six podiums to clinch the championship title, beating Seb Morris by 35 points.

As a reward for his title, Hughes tested a Dallara F308 for Carlin at the Circuit Ricardo Tormo, which he called "one of the best experiences in [his] life".

=== Formula Renault ===
Hughes returned in the Formula Renault machinery with Formula Renault 2.0 Northern European Cup switch in 2014. He had only one podium, finishing third at Silverstone on his route to the eighth in the series standings. Also in 2014, he had part-time campaigns in Eurocup Formula Renault 2.0 and Formula Renault 2.0 Alps.

For 2015, Hughes signed with Koiranen GP to contest full-time both in the Eurocup Formula Renault 2.0 and Formula Renault 2.0 Alps. He was victorious only in the second race at Spa and had another four podiums, finishing sixth in the championship. Though in the Alps championship he was more successful, winning races at Spa, Monza and Misano and taking the lead of the championship before the final round. However, due to two finishes outside of the podium places in that final event Hughes lost out on the title to Jack Aitken by just five points. In a podcast with Dan Ticktum six years later, Hughes revealed that he had competed in the final round with a cracked chassis, which had cost him performance throughout the weekend.

=== GP3 Series ===
Hughes graduated to the GP3 Series in 2016, joining newcomers DAMS. He earned his first GP3 victory in the sprint race at Hockenheim. At the final round of the season in Abu Dhabi, Hughes experienced a technical failure in qualifying and was forced to start from the pitlane in the feature race. Having climbed up to seventh by the end of race 1, the Brit won the second race of the weekend, which he later described as "one of [his] best [race] weekends".

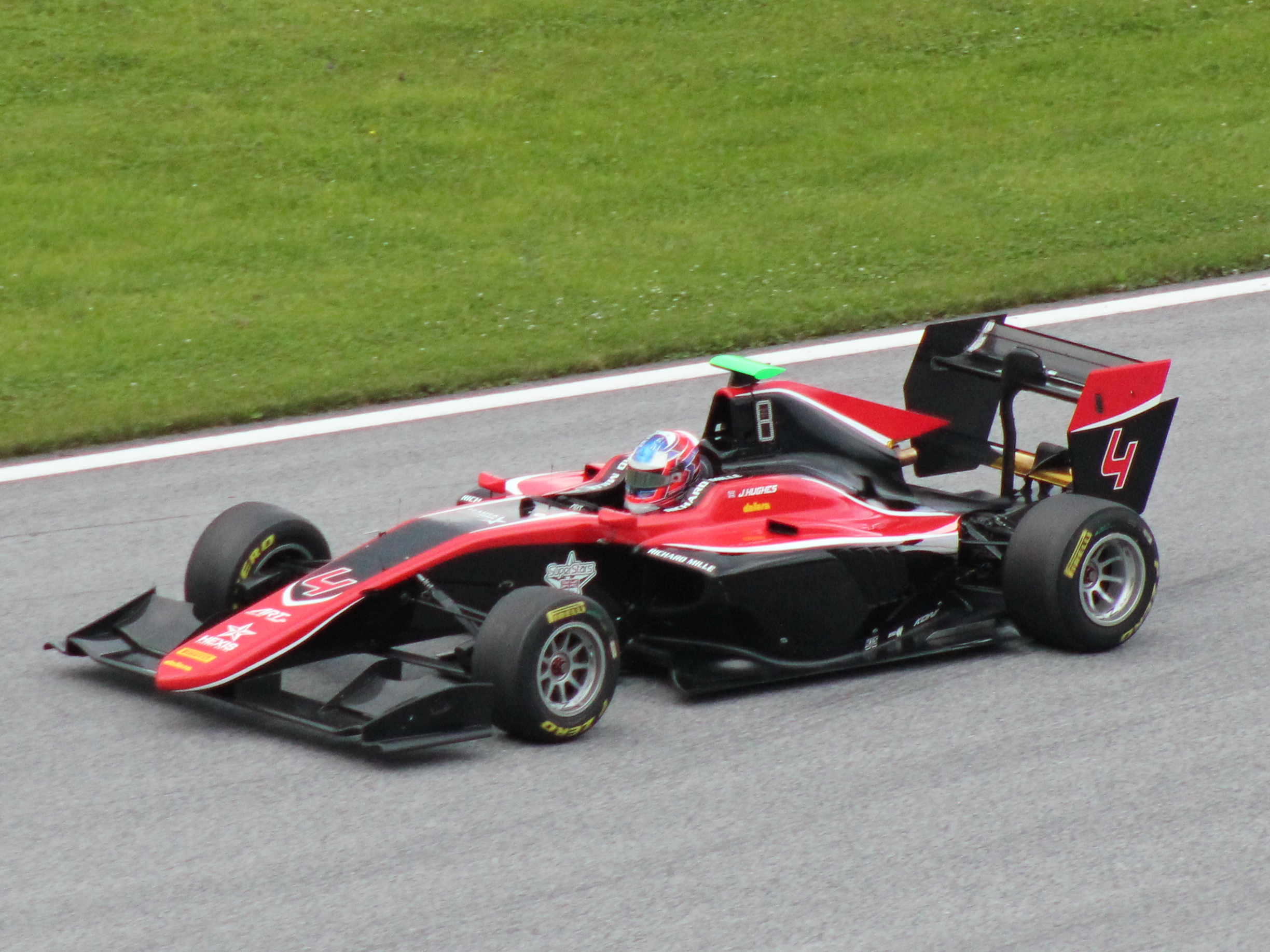
Hughes with ART Grand Prix in 2018

Hughes returned to the GP3 Series for 2018, after a one-year absence which he spent in the FIA Formula 3 European Championship. He raced for ART Grand Prix alongside Nikita Mazepin and his friends Callum Ilott and Anthoine Hubert. He claimed his first and only win of the year in the second race at the Red Bull Ring and ended up eighth in the standings, whilst his teammates locked out the first three positions in the standings.

=== Formula 3 ===
==== FIA F3 European Championship ====
For 2017, Hughes made the switch from the GP3 Series to the FIA Formula 3 European Championship, having competed in the final round of the 2016 season. He contested the season with the Hitech GP team. He claimed his first and only win at the second race in Nürburgring and finished the season 5th in the driver's championship.

==== 2019 ====
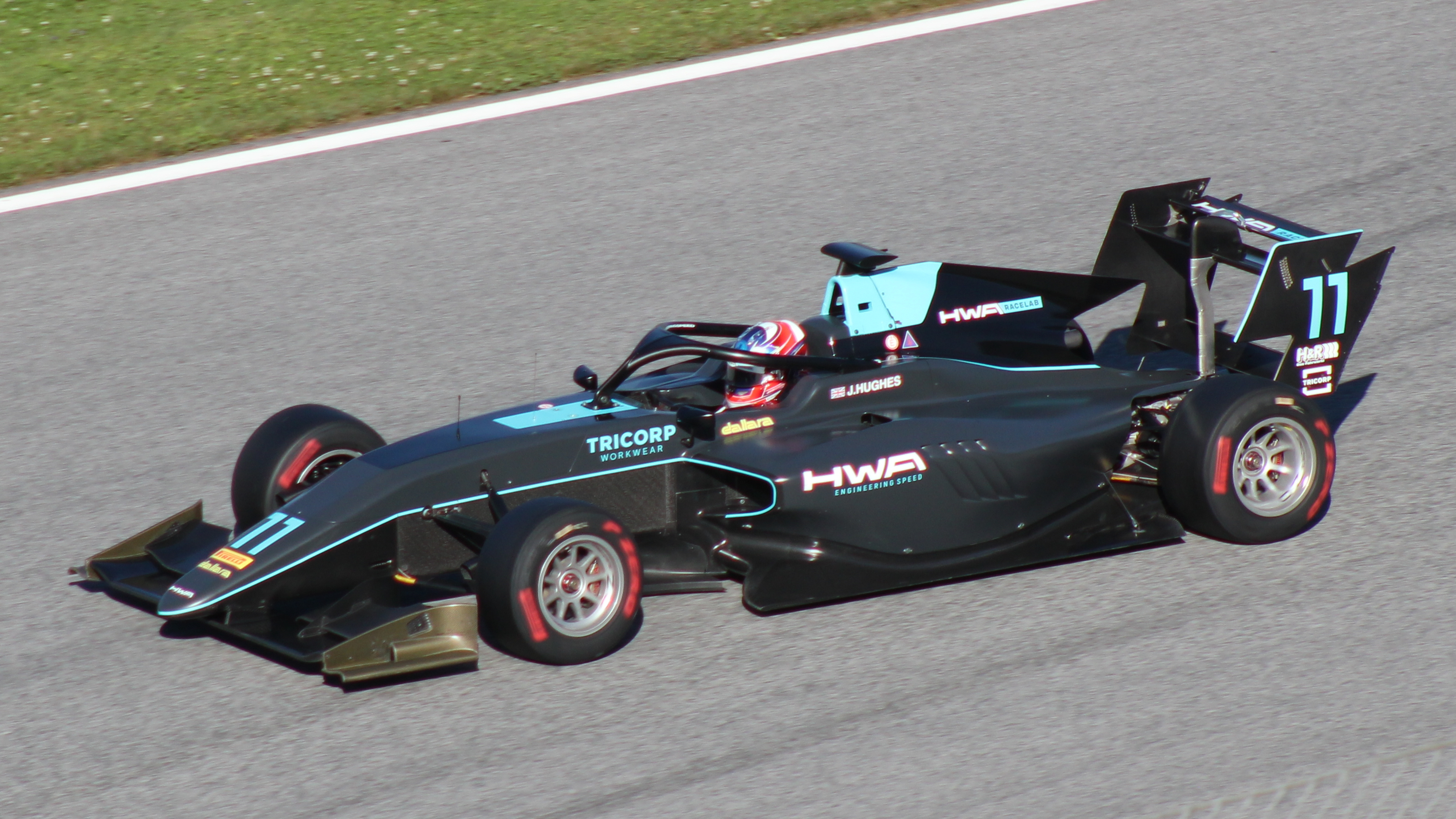
Hughes driving the Dallara F3 2019 during the 2019 Spielberg Formula 3 round.

Hughes continued in the third tier of single-seater racing, as the GP3 Series rebranded to become the FIA Formula 3 Championship. Hughes joined the new HWA Racelab outfit alongside Keyvan Andres and Bent Viscaal. Hughes claimed his only win of the year in a fortuitous sprint race at the Red Bull Ring, as race leaders Robert Shwartzman and Marcus Armstrong collided on the final lap. Shwartzman crossed the line first, but was given a penalty for causing the collision, handing the win to Hughes. Hughes claimed a double podium finish at the Hungaroring, finishing both races in third place. Hughes scored 90 of his team's 100 points over the season, placing him seventh in the drivers' championship.

==== 2020 ====
Hughes was retained by HWA Racelab for the 2020 season and was joined by Ferrari junior Enzo Fittipaldi and Red Bull junior Jack Doohan. Hughes experienced a poor start to the season, collecting only half a point from the first six races. He was on course for a top-two finish in the sprint race at the second Red Bull Ring round, but collided with Liam Lawson and suffered race-ending damage. He took his first podium of the year in the feature race at the second Silverstone round, followed by his first Formula 3 feature race victory in Barcelona the following week. Hughes claimed his second win of the year at the Monza sprint race. He ended the season seventh in the championship for a second consecutive year, scoring 111.5 of his team's 138.5 points.

==== 2021 ====
Shortly prior to the final round of the 2020 championship, Hughes announced that he would leave the series at the end of the year, having spent five years racing at Formula 3 level. However, in 2021, Hughes returned to the championship at the fourth round at the Hungaroring as a substitute driver, replacing the injured Kaylen Frederick at Carlin Buzz Racing. He finished the races in 16th, 17th and 13th respectively.

At the end of the year, Hughes tested a Mercedes-AMG GT3 Evo for Team HRT, driving alongside Lirim Zendeli, David Beckmann and David Schumacher at the Circuit Paul Ricard.

=== FIA Formula 2 Championship ===
==== 2020 & 2021: Partial campaigns ====
On 22 September 2020, it was announced that Hughes would step up to Formula 2, replacing Giuliano Alesi at the BWT HWA Racelab team for the tenth round at the Sochi Autodrom. Hughes finished 12th on his feature race debut, but was eliminated from the sprint race after a first-lap collision with Guilherme Samaia. Hughes was replaced by former FIA Formula 3 competitor Théo Pourchaire for the final two rounds in Bahrain.

Before the fifth round of the 2021 season, held at Monza, Hughes was confirmed to once again be stepping in at HWA, this time due to an injury sustained by regular driver Jack Aitken at the 24 Hours of Spa. In the first race, which was plagued by retirements from numerous other drivers, Hughes managed to finish twelfth, having started from the pit lane after stalling on the formation lap. He had to retire from the second race after a collision with his teammate Alessio Deledda. In the third race of the weekend, Hughes finished 13th. The following round at Sochi, Hughes went on to score his first points in Formula 2, finishing fourth in the sprint race. This also gave HWA their best ever race finish in the series to date.

==== 2022 ====
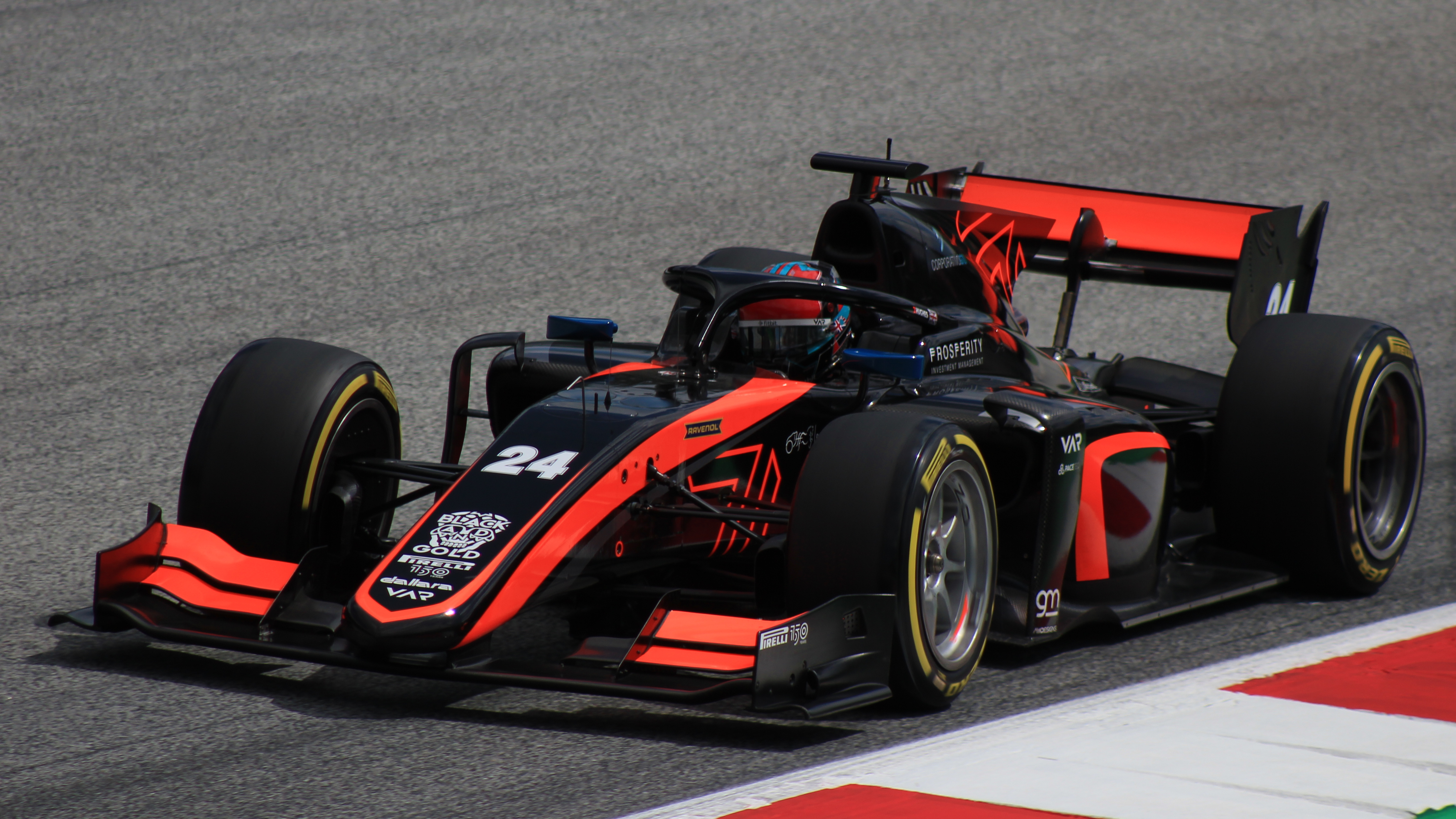
Hughes driving the Dallara F2 2018 during the 2022 Spielberg Formula 2 round.

After testing with new team Van Amersfoort Racing at the post-season test at Yas Marina, Hughes signed up with the team for the 2022 Formula 2 season, partnering Belgian Amaury Cordeel. Having started his season off with points at Bahrain, Hughes finished third in the Jeddah sprint race but was later disqualified for a technical infringement. Despite this disappointment, he would bounce back the following day, taking fourth place in the feature race. However, the following three rounds formed a points scoring drought, which was compounded by a crash during qualifying in Monaco and a subsequent stall at the start of the sprint race, which he began from pole. He returned to the top-ten in Baku, scoring a point on Sunday, before another tenth place at his home track of Silverstone. One week later in Austria, Hughes took a fifth place in a chaotic feature race, which would end up being his final points of the season, as Hughes would miss the French and Hungarian rounds after testing positive for COVID-19, being replaced by David Beckmann. Due to growing Formula E commitments, Hughes left VAR fully before the round at Spa-Francorchamps. He ended up 16th in the standings, outscoring teammate Cordeel, who had competed throughout the entire season.

== Formula E ==
Hughes made his first Formula E appearance during the 2019 rookie test in Marrakech, where he partnered Jamie Chadwick at Nio Formula E Team. The following year, he would once again appear in the rookie test at the same circuit, this time driving for Mercedes-Benz EQ Formula E Team alongside Daniel Juncadella.

On 25 February 2021, it was announced that Hughes would be the reserve driver for Venturi Racing in the 2020–21 Formula E World Championship. After deputising for Gary Paffett at Mercedes-EQ Formula E Team in the last rounds of the season, he was signed as the team's full-time reserve and development driver for the 2021–22 season.

=== McLaren (2023–2024) ===
==== 2022–23 season ====
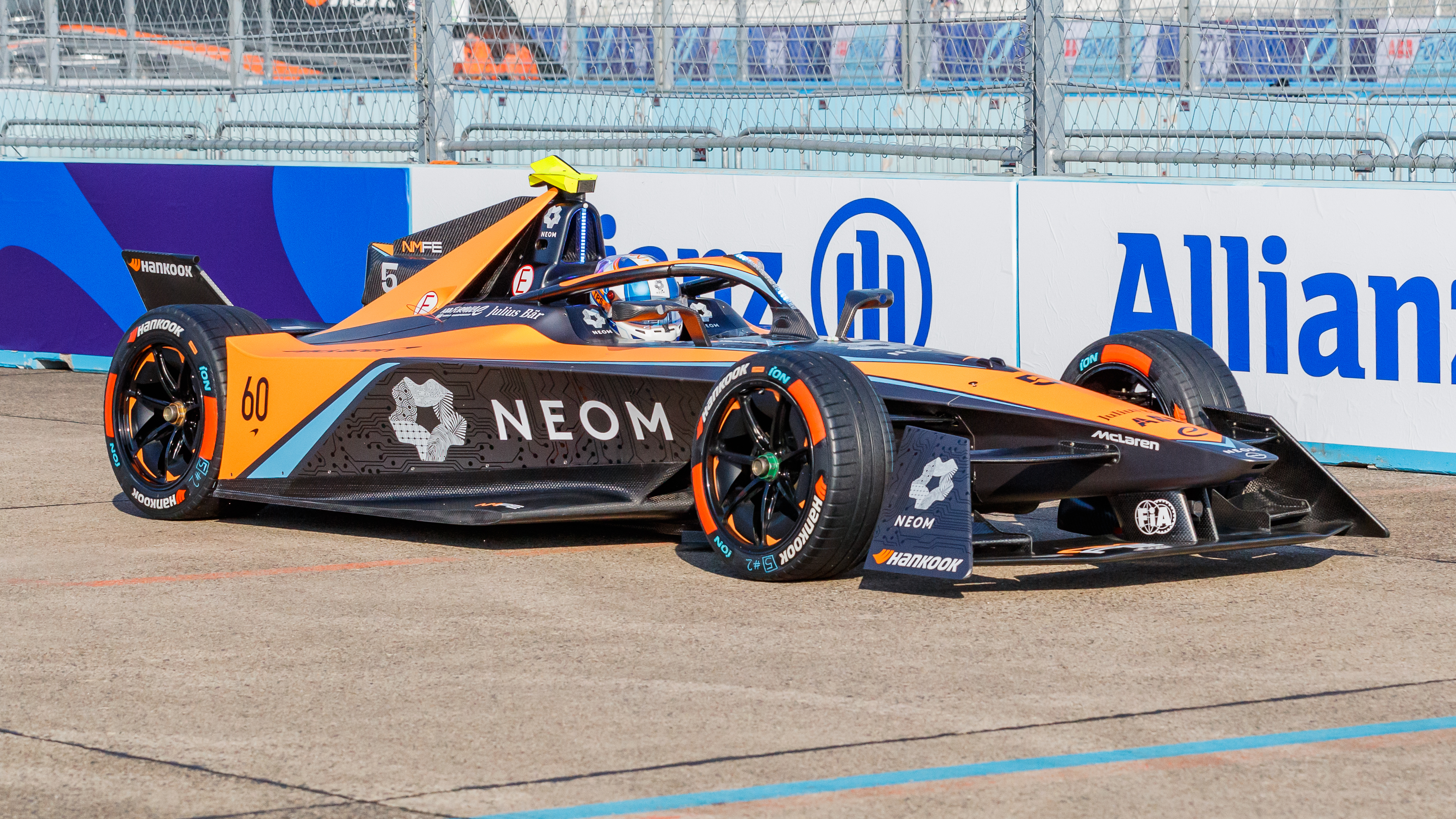
Hughes with NEOM McLaren at the 2023 Berlin ePrix.

After it was announced that Mercedes-EQ would be taken over by the McLaren Formula E Team, Hughes left Formula 2 in pursuit of taking one of the seats for the upcoming season. In November 2022, he joined McLaren for the 2022–23 season, partnering René Rast. The season started out strongly in Mexico City, as Hughes progressed to the semi-final stage in qualifying, ending up third on the grid before finishing the race in fifth place, having been overtaken by André Lotterer on the final lap. Following the conclusion to the race, Hughes branded the ePrix as the "hardest race [he'd] ever done". At the first round of the Diriyah ePrix, Hughes qualified at second place (missing out on pole position by 0.060s) but finished the race in eighth. More qualifying success followed in the second round, as Hughes took his first pole position in the series, beating Mitch Evans in the final. He ended the race in fifth position, having lost the lead to Evans at the start. At the Hyderabad ePrix, Hughes suffered his first retirement of the season as a piece of debris got lodged in his steering wheel, prompting him to withdraw.

A pair of tenth and eighth places followed at Cape Town and São Paulo, before having a disastrous at the Berlin ePrix in which he failed to score points. Hughes scored his second pole position at the Monaco ePrix after being promoted from second due to Nissan's Sacha Fenestraz being stripped of his pole position for exceeding his power limit in his final run. He finished the race in fifth. However, Hughes would only take two more tenth places throughout the rest of the season as the McLaren grew uncompetitive, and did not start the first race in Rome after a qualifying shunt. He placed 12th in the standings with 48 points, eight ahead of teammate Rast.

===== Indoor speed world record =====
During the London ePrix weekend, Hughes set a new Guinness World Records for indoor speed by hitting 218.71kmh/135.9 mph inside London's ExCeL Centre in a modified version of the Formula E Gen3 race car called the GENBETA. The previous record for fastest speed achieved by a vehicle indoors was 165.20kmh/102.65 mph set by American driver Leh Keen in a Porsche Taycan Turbo S at the New Orleans Convention Centre in 2021.

==== 2023–24 season ====
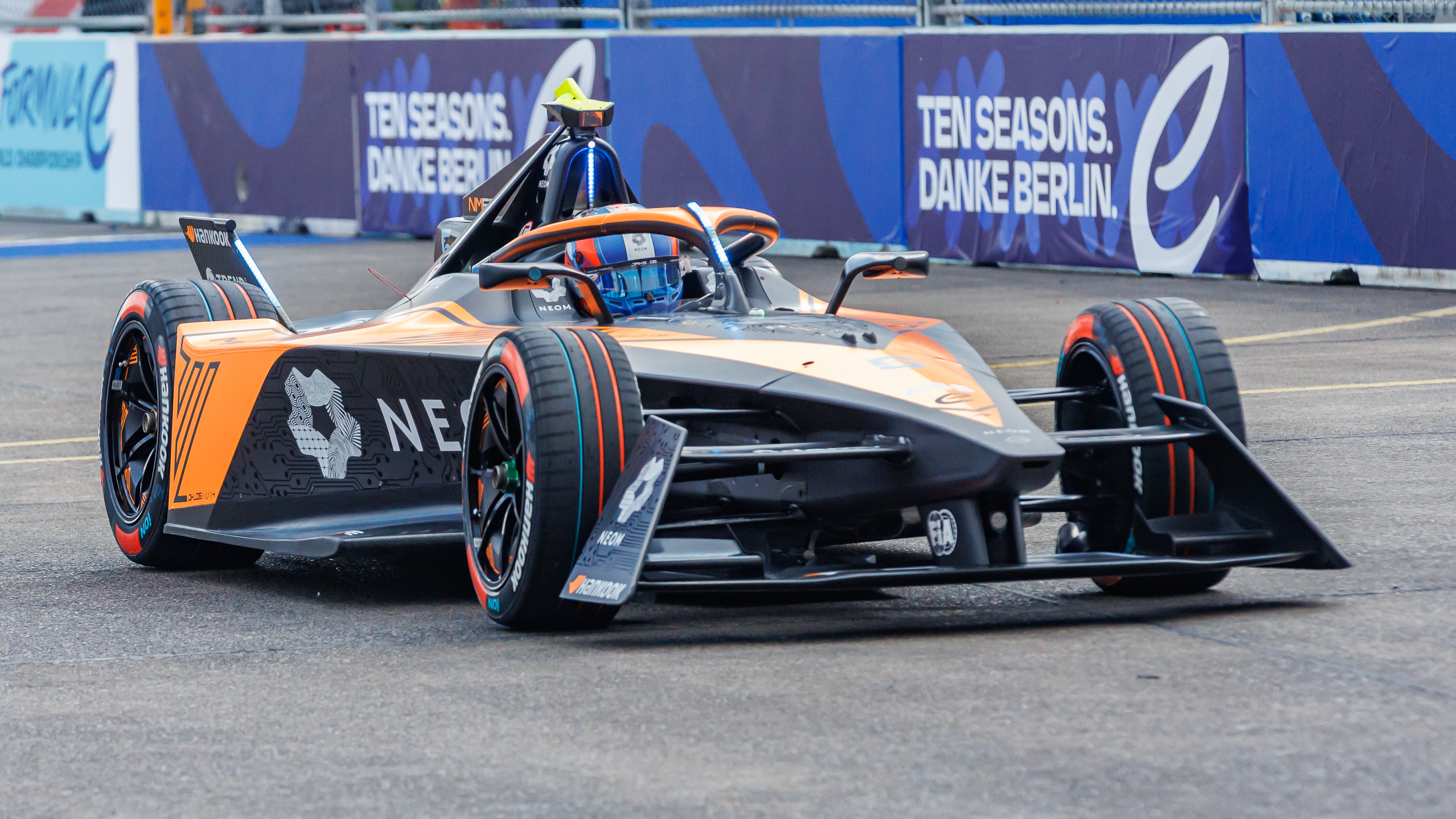
Hughes at the 2024 Berlin ePrix.

Hughes extended his stay with McLaren for the 2023–24 season and teamed with Sam Bird after René Rast's departure. He started the season positively with a seventh place at the Mexico City ePrix. After narrowly missing points during the first race in Diriyah, he bounced back in the second, taking his career best finish of fourth and revealed that he was "buzzing" after the race.

At the end of July, McLaren announced that they did not retain Hughes for a third season and he departed the team.

=== Maserati MSG Racing (2024–2025) ===
==== 2024–25 season ====
Just a few hours after his departure from McLaren, Maserati MSG Racing announced Hughes on a multi-year deal from the 2024–25 season, partnering 2021–22 champion Stoffel Vandoorne.

=== Mahindra reserve role (2026) ===
Despite being in contention for a drive with Cupra Kiro following a private test a few weeks prior to the Valencia pre-season test, the team ultimately decided to pick Pepe Martí, leaving Hughes without a drive for the 2025–26 season. Nevertheless, he signed with Mahindra Racing to be their test and reserve driver for that season.

=== Cupra Kiro (2027–) ===
==== 2026–27 season ====
Hughes returned to Formula E with Cupra Kiro in place of Dan Ticktum for the 2026–27 season, partnering Pepe Martí.

== Other racing ==
In June 2025, Hughes tested a Formula One car for the first time in Barcelona, where he underwent a test programme with McLaren driving the McLaren MCL60.

== Personal life ==
Hughes was born in Birmingham, England and is a supporter of Aston Villa FC.

Hughes was a co-host of the H.Y.M podcast, alongside BMW factory driver Nick Yelloly and Superbike racer Alex Murley, where the three interviewed notable motorsport personalities, such as Seb Morris, Sheldon van der Linde, Jordan King and Dan Ticktum.

== Karting record ==
=== Karting career summary ===
Season	Series	Team	Position
2010	Easykart UK Championship — Junior	ACR	11th
2010	Easykart International Grand Finals — 100 Easykart	Easykart UK	DNF
2011	Super 1 National Championship — Formula KGP		5th
2012	Super 1 National Championship — Formula KGP		4th
2012	Kartmasters British Grand Prix — Formula KGP		3rd
2012	Easykart UK Championship — Light		1st
2012	Easykart International Grand Finals — TAG Under		6th

== Racing record ==
=== Racing career summary ===
Season	Series	Team	Races	Wins	Poles	F/Laps	Podiums	Points	Position
2012	V de V Challenge Monoplace	Antel Motorsport	2	0	0	0	0	25	45th
2012	Formula Renault BARC	Antel Motorsport	2	0	0	0	0	7	30th
2012	Formula Renault BARC Winter Series	MGR Motorsport	2	0	0	0	0	24	14th
2013	BRDC Formula 4 Championship	Lanan Racing	24	4	4	6	10	445	**1st**
2014	Formula Renault 2.0 NEC	ART Junior Team	4	0	0	0	0	152	8th
2014	Formula Renault 2.0 NEC	Mark Burdett Racing	11	0	0	0	1	152	8th
2014	Eurocup Formula Renault 2.0	Mark Burdett Racing	2	0	0	0	0	0	NC†
2014	Eurocup Formula Renault 2.0	Strakka Racing	4	0	0	1	0	0	NC†
2014	Formula Renault 2.0 Alps	Strakka Racing	2	0	0	0	0	0	NC†
2015	Eurocup Formula Renault 2.0	Koiranen GP	17	1	1	0	5	160	6th
2015	Formula Renault 2.0 Alps	Koiranen GP	16	3	2	3	7	237	**2nd**
2016	GP3 Series	DAMS	18	2	1	2	4	90	8th
2016	FIA Formula 3 European Championship	Carlin	3	0	0	0	1	27	16th
2016	Macau Grand Prix	Carlin	1	0	0	0	0	N/A	6th
2017	FIA Formula 3 European Championship	Hitech GP	30	1	2	2	7	207	5th
2018	GP3 Series	ART Grand Prix	18	1	0	0	3	85	8th
2018	F3 Asian Championship	Hitech GP	9	9	6	8	9	225	**2nd**
2018	Macau Grand Prix	Hitech GP	1	0	0	0	0	N/A	4th
2019	FIA Formula 3 Championship	HWA Racelab	16	1	1	2	4	90	7th
2019	Macau Grand Prix	HWA Racelab	1	0	0	1	0	N/A	17th
2019	Formula Regional European Championship	KIC Motorsport	3	0	0	1	3	45	12th
2019–20	F3 Asian Championship	Hitech Grand Prix	6	0	0	1	0	24	14th
2020	FIA Formula 3 Championship	HWA Racelab	18	2	0	3	4	111.5	7th
2020	FIA Formula 2 Championship	BWT HWA Racelab	2	0	0	0	0	0	23rd
2020–21	Formula E	Mercedes-EQ Formula E Team	Reserve/Development driver						
2020–21	Formula E	ROKiT Venturi Racing	Reserve/Development driver						
2021	FIA Formula 2 Championship	HWA Racelab	8	0	0	0	0	8	18th
2021	FIA Formula 3 Championship	Carlin Buzz Racing	3	0	0	0	0	0	27th
2021	Formula One	Mercedes-AMG Petronas F1 Team	Simulator driver						
2021–22	Formula E	Mercedes-EQ Formula E Team	Reserve/Development driver						
2021–22	Formula E	ROKiT Venturi Racing	Reserve/Development driver						
2022	FIA Formula 2 Championship	Van Amersfoort Racing	16	0	0	0	0	26	16th
2022	Formula One	Mercedes-AMG Petronas F1 Team	Simulator driver						
2022	Formula One	Aston Martin Aramco Cognizant F1 Team	Simulator driver						
2022–23	Formula E	Neom McLaren Formula E Team	15	0	2	0	0	48	12th
2023–24	Formula E	NEOM McLaren Formula E Team	16	0	2	2	1	48	14th
2024–25	Formula E	Maserati MSG Racing	16	0	0	0	1	40	16th
2025	Formula One	McLaren F1 Team	Test/Simulator driver						
2025–26	Formula E	Mahindra Racing	Reserve/Development driver						
2026	European Le Mans Series - LMP2	Algarve Pro Racing	6	1	0	0	2	62	4th
2026	24 Hours of Le Mans - LMP2	Algarve Pro Racing	1	0	0	0	0	N/A	4th
2026	Formula One	McLaren Mastercard F1 Team	Test/Simulator driver						
2026–27	Formula E	Cupra Kiro	0	0	0	0	0	0	TBD

^{†} As Hughes was a guest driver, he was ineligible for championship points.
^{*} Season still in progress.

=== Complete BRDC Formula 4 Championship results ===
(key) (Races in bold indicate pole position) (Races in italics indicate points for the fastest lap of top ten finishers)

Year	Team	1	2	3	4	5	6	7	8	9	10	11	12	13	14	15	16	17	18	19	20	21	22	23	24	DC	Points
2013	Lanan Racing	**SIL1**; **1**; 2	SIL1; 2; 5	SIL1; 3 Ret	BRH1; 1; 6	BRH1; 2; 4	BRH1; 3; 11	SNE1; 1; 9	SNE1; 2; 6	SNE1; 3; 1	OUL; 1; 2	OUL; 2; 6	OUL; 3; 2	BRH2; 1; 4	BRH2; 2; 4	**BRH2**; **3**; 1	SIL2; 1; 2	SIL2; 2; 9	**SIL2**; **3**; 1	**SNE2**; **1**; 3	SNE2; 2; 2	SNE2; 3; 8	**DON**; **1**; 1	DON; 2; 6	DON; 3; 4	1st	445

=== Complete Formula Renault 2.0 Northern European Cup results ===
(key) (Races in bold indicate pole position; races in italics indicate fastest lap)

Year	Entrant	1	2	3	4	5	6	7	8	9	10	11	12	13	14	15	16	17	DC	Points
2014	Mark Burdett Racing	MNZ; 1 Ret	MNZ; 2; 26	SIL; 1; 3	SIL; 2; 5	HOC; 1; 7	HOC; 2; 8	HOC; 3; 10	SPA; 1; 10	SPA; 2; 9	ASS; 1; 16	ASS; 2; 11							8th	152
2014	ART Junior Team												MST; 1; 7	MST; 2; 22	MST; 3 C	NÜR; 1; 6	NÜR; 2; 10	NÜR; 3 C	8th	152

=== Complete Formula Renault Eurocup results ===
(key) (Races in bold indicate pole position; races in italics indicate fastest lap)

Year	Entrant	1	2	3	4	5	6	7	8	9	10	11	12	13	14	15	16	17	DC	Points
2014	Mark Burdett Racing	ALC; 1	ALC; 2	SPA; 1 Ret	SPA; 2; 22	SIL; 1	SIL; 2	NÜR; 1	NÜR; 2										NC†	0
2014	Strakka Racing									HUN; 1; 24	HUN; 2; 12	LEC; 1	LEC; 2	JER; 1 Ret	JER; 2; 8				NC†	0
2015	Koiranen GP	ALC; 1; 8	ALC; 2; 7	ALC; 3; 13	**SPA**; **1**; 2	SPA; 2; 1	HUN; 1; 6	HUN; 2; 3	SIL; 1; 3	SIL; 2; 3	SIL; 3; 5	NÜR; 1; 5	NÜR; 2; 7	LMS; 1 Ret	LMS; 2; 15	JER; 1; 5	JER; 2; 7	JER; 3; 4	6th	160

^{†} As Hughes was a guest driver, he was ineligible for points.

=== Complete Formula Renault 2.0 Alps Series results ===
(key) (Races in bold indicate pole position) (Races in italics indicate fastest lap)

Year	Team	1	2	3	4	5	6	7	8	9	10	11	12	13	14	15	16	Pos	Points
2014	Strakka Racing	IMO; 1	IMO; 2	PAU; 1	PAU; 2	RBR; 1	RBR; 2	SPA; 1	SPA; 2	MNZ; 1	MNZ; 2	MUG; 1	MUG; 2	JER; 1; 9	JER; 2; 5			NC†	0
2015	Koiranen GP	IMO; 1 Ret	IMO; 2; 3	PAU; 1; 5	PAU; 2; 2	RBR; 1; 6	RBR; 2; 2	RBR; 3; 4	**SPA**; **1**; 1	SPA; 2; 3	MNZ; 1; 14	**MNZ**; **2**; 1	MNZ; 3 Ret	MIS; 1; 5	MIS; 2; 1	JER; 1; 4	JER; 2; 9	2nd	237

† As Hughes was a guest driver, he was ineligible for points

=== Complete GP3 Series/FIA Formula 3 Championship results ===
(key) (Races in bold indicate pole position) (Races in italics indicate fastest lap)

Year	Entrant	1	2	3	4	5	6	7	8	9	10	11	12	13	14	15	16	17	18	19	20	21	Pos	Points
2016	DAMS	**CAT**; **FEA**; 2	CAT; SPR; 8	RBR; FEA; 8	RBR; SPR; 6	SIL; FEA; Ret	SIL; SPR; 17	HUN; FEA; 23	HUN; SPR; 19	HOC; FEA; 8	HOC; SPR; 1	SPA; FEA; Ret	SPA; SPR; Ret	MNZ; FEA; 3	MNZ; SPR; 10	SEP; FEA; Ret	SEP; SPR; 12	YMC; FEA; 7	YMC; SPR; 1				8th	90
2018	ART Grand Prix	CAT; FEA; 13	CAT; SPR; 3	LEC; FEA; 10	LEC; SPR; 17	RBR; FEA; 5	RBR; SPR; 1	SIL; FEA; Ret	SIL; SPR; 8	HUN; FEA; 16	HUN; SPR; 14	SPA; FEA; 7	SPA; SPR; 4	MNZ; FEA; 9	MNZ; SPR; 4	SOC; FEA; 7	SOC; SPR; 16	YMC; FEA; 7	YMC; SPR; 2				8th	85
2019	HWA Racelab	CAT; FEA; 17	CAT; SPR; Ret	**LEC**; **FEA**; Ret	LEC; SPR; 7	RBR; FEA; 7	RBR; SPR; 1	SIL; FEA; 9	SIL; SPR; Ret	HUN; FEA; 3	HUN; SPR; 3	SPA; FEA; 21	SPA; SPR; Ret	MNZ; FEA; 6	MNZ; SPR; 3	SOC; FEA; 7	SOC; SPR; 4						7th	90
2020	HWA Racelab	RBR; FEA; 28	RBR; SPR; 12	RBR; FEA; 10	RBR; SPR; Ret	HUN; FEA; 24	HUN; SPR; 19	SIL; FEA; 4	SIL; SPR; 10	SIL; FEA; 2	SIL; SPR; 7	CAT; FEA; 1	CAT; SPR; 10	SPA; FEA; Ret	SPA; SPR; 17	MNZ; FEA; 5	MNZ; SPR; 1	MUG; FEA; 2	MUG; SPR; 6				7th	111.5
2021	Carlin Buzz Racing	CAT; 1	CAT; 2	CAT; 3	LEC; 1	LEC; 2	LEC; 3	RBR; 1	RBR; 2	RBR; 3	HUN; 1; 16	HUN; 2; 17	HUN; 3; 13	SPA; 1	SPA; 2	SPA; 3	ZAN; 1	ZAN; 2	ZAN; 3	SOC; 1	SOC; 2	SOC; 3	27th	0

^{‡} Half points awarded as less than 75% of race distance was completed.

=== Complete FIA Formula 3 European Championship results ===
(key) (Races in bold indicate pole position) (Races in italics indicate fastest lap)

Year	Entrant	Engine	1	2	3	4	5	6	7	8	9	10	11	12	13	14	15	16	17	18	19	20	21	22	23	24	25	26	27	28	29	30	DC	Points
2016	Carlin	Volkswagen	LEC; 1	LEC; 2	LEC; 3	HUN; 1	HUN; 2	HUN; 3	PAU; 1	PAU; 2	PAU; 3	RBR; 1	RBR; 2	RBR; 3	NOR; 1	NOR; 2	NOR; 3	ZAN; 1	ZAN; 2	ZAN; 3	SPA; 1	SPA; 2	SPA; 3	NÜR; 1	NÜR; 2	NÜR; 3	IMO; 1	IMO; 2	IMO; 3	HOC; 1; 19	HOC; 2; 4	HOC; 3; 3	16th	27
2017	Hitech GP	Mercedes	SIL; 1; 13	SIL; 2; 3	SIL; 3; 13	MNZ; 1; 10	MNZ; 2; 13	MNZ; 3 Ret	PAU; 1 Ret	PAU; 2; 6	PAU; 3 Ret	HUN; 1; 2	HUN; 2; 4	HUN; 3; 7	**NOR**; **1** Ret	NOR; 2; 2	NOR; 3; 5	SPA; 1 Ret	SPA; 2; 4	SPA; 3 Ret	ZAN; 1; 8	ZAN; 2; 2	ZAN; 3; 5	NÜR; 1; 2	**NÜR**; **2**; 1	NÜR; 3; 2	RBR; 1; 11	RBR; 2; 13	RBR; 3; 16	HOC; 1; 12	HOC; 2; 5	HOC; 3; 8	5th	207

=== Complete Macau Grand Prix results ===
Year	Team	Car	Qualifying	Quali Race	Main race
2016	(United Kingdom) Carlin	Dallara F312	6th	10th	6th
2018	(United Kingdom) Hitech GP	Dallara F317	6th	5th	4th
2019	(Germany) HWA Racelab	Dallara F3 2019	6th	DNF	17th

=== Complete F3 Asian Championship results ===
(key) (Races in bold indicate pole position) (Races in italics indicate fastest lap)

Year	Entrant	1	2	3	4	5	6	7	8	9	10	11	12	13	14	15	Pos	Points
2018	Dragon HitechGP	**SEP1**; **1**; 1	SEP1; 2; 1	**SEP1**; **3**; 1	NIS1; 1	NIS1; 2	NIS1; 3	**SIC**; **1**; 1	SIC; 2; 1	**SIC**; **3**; 1	**NIS2**; **1**; 1	NIS2; 2; 1	**NIS2**; **3**; 1	SEP2; 1	SEP2; 2	SEP2; 3	2nd	225
2019–20	Hitech Grand Prix	SEP1; 1 Ret	SEP1; 2; 7	SEP1; 3; 6	DUB; 1; 12	DUB; 2; 5	DUB; 3 Ret	ABU; 1	ABU; 2	ABU; 3	SEP2; 1	SEP2; 2	SEP2; 3	CHA; 1	CHA; 2	CHA; 3	14th	24

=== Complete FIA Formula 2 Championship results ===
(key) (Races in bold indicate pole position) (Races in italics indicate points for the fastest lap of top ten finishers)

Year	Entrant	1	2	3	4	5	6	7	8	9	10	11	12	13	14	15	16	17	18	19	20	21	22	23	24	25	26	27	28	NC	Points
2020	BWT HWA Racelab	RBR; FEA	RBR; SPR	RBR; FEA	RBR; SPR	HUN; FEA	HUN; SPR	SIL; FEA	SIL; SPR	SIL; FEA	SIL; SPR	CAT; FEA	CAT; SPR	SPA; FEA	SPA; SPR	MNZ; FEA	MNZ; SPR	MUG; FEA	MUG; SPR	SOC; FEA; 12	SOC; SPR; Ret	BHR; FEA	BHR; SPR	BHR; FEA	BHR; SPR					23rd	0
2021	HWA Racelab	BHR; SP1	BHR; SP2	BHR; FEA	MCO; SP1	MCO; SP2	MCO; FEA	BAK; SP1	BAK; SP2	BAK; FEA	SIL; SP1	SIL; SP2	SIL; FEA	MNZ; SP1; 12	MNZ; SP2; Ret	MNZ; FEA; 13	SOC; SP1; 4	SOC; SP2; C	SOC; FEA; 18	JED; SP1	JED; SP2	JED; FEA	YMC; SP1; Ret	YMC; SP2; 13	YMC; FEA; Ret					18th	8
2022	Van Amersfoort Racing	BHR; SPR; Ret	BHR; FEA; 9	JED; SPR; DSQ	JED; FEA; 4	IMO; SPR; 18	IMO; FEA; 12	CAT; SPR; 20†	CAT; FEA; 16	MCO; SPR; 18	MCO; FEA; 13	BAK; SPR; 9	BAK; FEA; 10	SIL; SPR; 11	SIL; FEA; 10	RBR; SPR; 16	RBR; FEA; 5	LEC; SPR	LEC; FEA	HUN; SPR	HUN; FEA	SPA; SPR	SPA; FEA	ZAN; SPR	ZAN; FEA	MNZ; SPR	MNZ; FEA	YMC; SPR	YMC; FEA	16th	26

=== Complete Formula E results ===
(key) (Races in bold indicate pole position; races in italics indicate fastest lap)

Year	Team	Chassis	Powertrain	1	2	3	4	5	6	7	8	9	10	11	12	13	14	15	16	Pos	Points
2022–23	NEOM McLaren Formula E Team	Formula E Gen3	Nissan e-4ORCE 04	MEX; 5	DRH; 8	**DRH**; 5	HYD; Ret	CAP; 10	SAP; 8	BER; Ret	BER; 18	**MCO**; 5	JAK; 10	JAK; Ret	POR; 18	RME; DNS	RME; 11	LDN; 10	LDN; 19	12th	48
2023–24	NEOM McLaren Formula E Team	Formula E Gen3	Nissan e-4ORCE 04	MEX; 7	DRH; 11	DRH; 4	SAP; Ret	TOK; 14	MIS; 13	**MIS**; 8	MCO; 16	BER; 15	BER; 12	SIC; 16	**SIC**; 2	POR; 21	POR; Ret	LDN; Ret	LDN; 10	14th	48
2024–25	Maserati MSG Racing	Formula E Gen3 Evo	Maserati Tipo Folgore	SAO; Ret	MEX; 10	JED; 5	JED; 3	MIA; Ret	MCO; 16	MCO; 17	TKO; 19	TKO; 18	SHA; 16	SHA; 4	JKT; Ret	BER; 14	BER; 10	LDN; Ret	LDN; 17	16th	40

^{*} Season still in progress.

=== Complete European Le Mans Series results ===
(key) (Races in bold indicate pole position; results in italics indicate fastest lap)

Year	Entrant	Class	Chassis	Engine	1	2	3	4	5	6	Rank	Points
2026	Algarve Pro Racing	LMP2	Oreca 07	Gibson GK428 4.2 L V8	CAT; 9	LEC; 9	IMO; 3	SPA; 5	SIL; 1	ALG; 6	4th	62

=== Complete 24 Hours of Le Mans results ===
Year	Team	Co-Drivers	Car	Class	Laps	Pos.	Class Pos.
2026	(Portugal) Algarve Pro Racing	(Denmark) Michael Jensen (Italy) Enzo Trulli	Oreca 07-Gibson	LMP2	356	26th	12th
2026	(Portugal) Algarve Pro Racing	(Denmark) Michael Jensen (Italy) Enzo Trulli	Oreca 07-Gibson	LMP2 Pro-Am	356	26th	4th

Sporting positions
Preceded by Inaugural	BRDC Formula 4 Championship; Champion; 2013	Succeeded by George Russell
