= 2018–19 MRF Challenge Formula 2000 Championship =

Auto racing championship in India

The 2018–19 MRF Challenge Formula 2000 Championship was the sixth running of the MRF Challenge Formula 2000 Championship. It began on 16 November 2018 at the Dubai Autodrome in Dubai, United Arab Emirates and finished on 10 February 2019 at the Madras Motor Race Track in Chennai, India. The series comprised 15 races spread across three meetings. The 2018–19 season saw Britain's Jamie Chadwick become the first female champion of the series.

== Drivers ==
The following drivers contested the championship:

No.	Driver	Rounds
3	(Australia) Dylan Young	All
4	(Australia) Jack Doohan	3
5	(Finland) Patrik Pasma	All
7	(India) Chetan Korada	All
8	(Belgium) Michelangelo Amendola	All
10	(Germany) Sebastian Estner	All
11	(Germany) Andreas Estner	All
16	(Netherlands) Glenn van Berlo	3
18	(Saudi Arabia) Reema Juffali	3
21	(United Kingdom) Josh Mason	All
26	(Sweden) Linus Lundqvist	3
33	(Belgium) Max Defourny	All
55	(United Kingdom) Jamie Chadwick	All
68	(Singapore) Danial Frost	1–2
85	(Denmark) Valdemar Eriksen (Note: Ineligible to score points in Rounds 1 & 2 due to being under 16 years old.)	All
99	(Czech Republic) Petr Ptáček	1–2

== Calendar and results ==
Round		Circuit	Date	Pole position	Fastest lap	Winning driver
2018
1	R1	(United Arab Emirates) Dubai Autodrome, Dubai	16 November	(Belgium) Max Defourny	(Singapore) Danial Frost	(Belgium) Max Defourny
1	R2	(United Arab Emirates) Dubai Autodrome, Dubai	16 November		(Belgium) Max Defourny	(Singapore) Danial Frost
1	R3	(United Arab Emirates) Dubai Autodrome, Dubai	17 November	(Belgium) Max Defourny	(Belgium) Max Defourny	(Germany) Andreas Estner
1	R4	(United Arab Emirates) Dubai Autodrome, Dubai	17 November		(Belgium) Max Defourny	(Finland) Patrik Pasma
1	R5	(United Arab Emirates) Dubai Autodrome, Dubai	17 November		(United Kingdom) Jamie Chadwick	(Belgium) Max Defourny
2	R1	Bahrain International Circuit, Sakhir	7 December	(Belgium) Max Defourny	(Belgium) Max Defourny	(Germany) Andreas Estner
2	R2	Bahrain International Circuit, Sakhir	7 December		(United Kingdom) Jamie Chadwick	(United Kingdom) Jamie Chadwick
2	R3	Bahrain International Circuit, Sakhir	7 December	(Belgium) Max Defourny	(Belgium) Max Defourny	(Belgium) Max Defourny
2	R4	Bahrain International Circuit, Sakhir	9 December		(United Kingdom) Jamie Chadwick	(United Kingdom) Jamie Chadwick
2	R5	Bahrain International Circuit, Sakhir	9 December		(United Kingdom) Jamie Chadwick	(United Kingdom) Jamie Chadwick
2019
3	R1	(India) Madras Motor Race Track, Chennai	9 February	(Finland) Patrik Pasma	(Finland) Patrik Pasma	(Finland) Patrik Pasma
3	R2	(India) Madras Motor Race Track, Chennai	9 February		(Belgium) Max Defourny	(United Kingdom) Jamie Chadwick
3	R3	(India) Madras Motor Race Track, Chennai	10 February	(Finland) Patrik Pasma	(Finland) Patrik Pasma	(Finland) Patrik Pasma
3	R4	(India) Madras Motor Race Track, Chennai	10 February		(Belgium) Michelangelo Amendola	(United Kingdom) Jamie Chadwick
3	R5	(India) Madras Motor Race Track, Chennai	10 February		(United Kingdom) Jamie Chadwick	(United Kingdom) Jamie Chadwick

== Championship standings ==
Scoring system

Position	1st	2nd	3rd	4th	5th	6th	7th	8th	9th	10th	R1 PP	FL
Points	25	18	15	12	10	8	6	4	2	1	2	2

Drivers' standings

Pos.	Driver	DUB (United Arab Emirates)					BHR (Bahrain)					CHE (India)					Points
1	(United Kingdom) Jamie Chadwick	2	4	2	5	2	4	1	4	1	1	5	1	5	1	1	280
2	(Belgium) Max Defourny	1	3	3	2	1	2	2	1	5	2	7	6	7	4	6	243
3	(Finland) Patrik Pasma	Ret	8	6	1	4	7	4	3	4	DNS	1	5	1	6	2	186
4	(Germany) Andreas Estner	11	7	1	6	5	1	7	2	3	5	4	3	4	7	4	181
5	(Belgium) Michelangelo Amendola	5	5	5	3	9	8	5	5	6	6	2	4	2	2	3	172
6	(Australia) Dylan Young	4	6	8	7	10	5	3	7	8	4	6	2	8	5	7	125
7	(Singapore) Danial Frost	3	1	11	4	3	3	DNS	12	7	3						106
8	(Czech Republic) Petr Ptáček	6	2	4	10	6	6	9	6	2	7						91
9	(Australia) Jack Doohan											3	9	6	3	5	50
10	(Germany) Sebastian Estner	7	9	7	8	7	10	6	8	9	Ret	11	14	11	DNS	11	40
11	(Sweden) Linus Lundqvist											8	7	3	Ret	Ret	25
12	(United Kingdom) Josh Mason	9	10	10	9	11	12	10	10	10	8	14	12	Ret	DNS	12	19
13	(Netherlands) Glenn van Berlo											10	8	10	8	9	12
14	(Denmark) Valdemar Eriksen	8	11	9	11	8	9	8	9	11	9	9	10	9	DNS	8	9
15	(India) Chetan Korada	10	12	12	12	12	11	11	11	12	10	12	11	13	10	10	9
16	(Saudi Arabia) Reema Juffali											13	13	12	9	13	2
