= Andreas Estner =

German racing driver

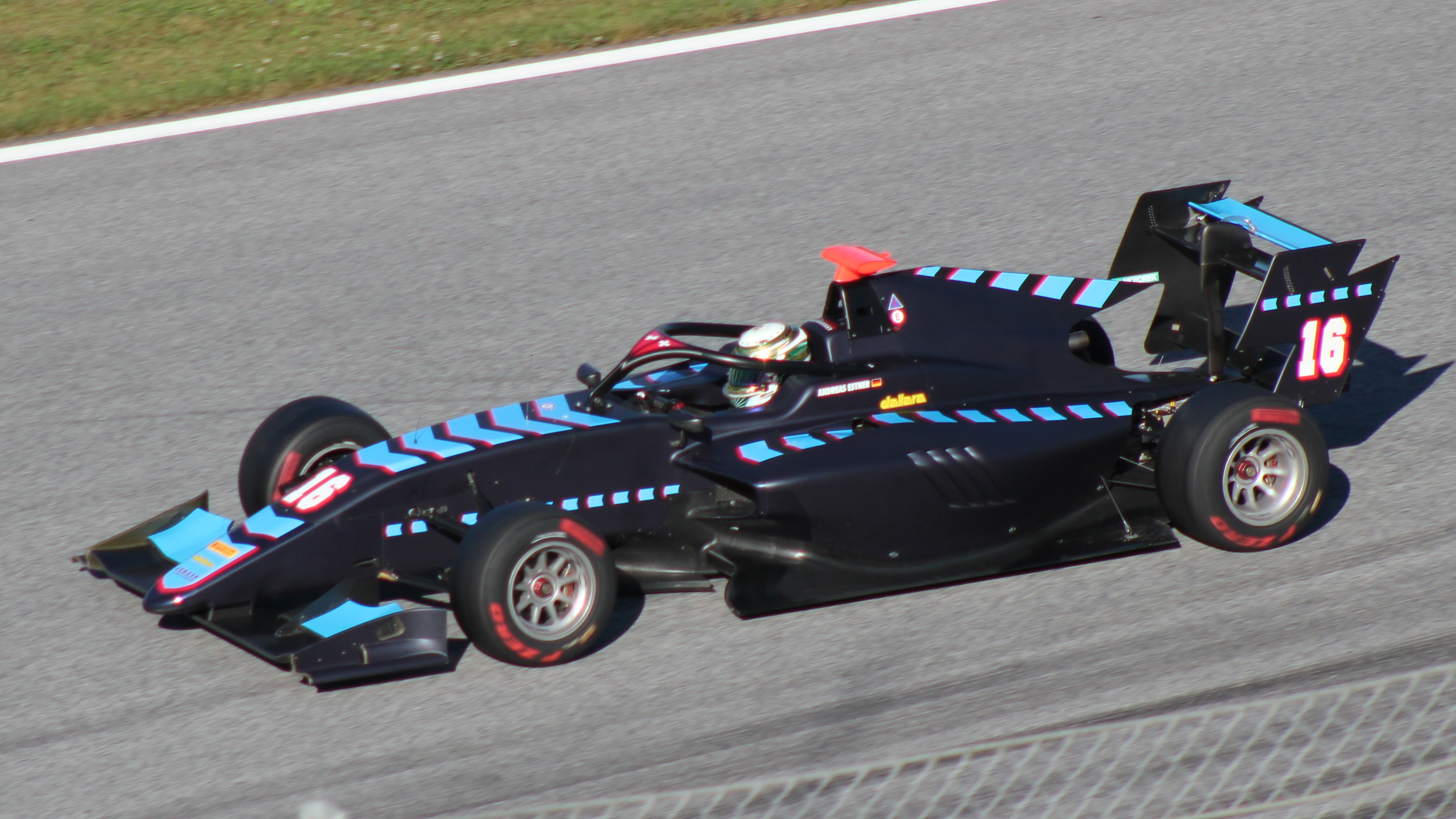
- Nationality: (Germany) German
- Born: Andreas Johannes Estner; 3 July 2000 (age 26) Munich, Bavaria, Germany
- Relatives: Sebastian Estner (brother)

FIA Formula 3 Championship career
- Debut season: 2019
- Current team: Campos Racing
- Car number: 31
- Former teams: Jenzer Motorsport
- Starts: 18 (18 entries)
- Wins: 0
- Podiums: 0
- Poles: 0
- Fastest laps: 0
- Best finish: 26th in 2019

Previous series
- 2016–2018 2017 2017–2018 2018-19: Formula 4 Germany; Formula Renault 2.0 NEC; Formula 4 Italy; MRF Challenge

Andreas Johannes Estner (born 3 July 2000) is a German former racing driver. He last competed in the Euroformula Open Championship with Van Amersfoort Racing. His brother Sebastian is also a racing driver.

== Karting record ==
=== Karting career summary ===
Season	Series	Team	Position
2015	Rotax Max Challenge Germany — Junior		2nd
2015	Rotax Max Euro Challenge — Junior	RS Competition	30th
2015	Rotax Max Challenge Grand Finals — Junior	RS Competition	20th
2015	Rotax International Open — Junior		22nd
2015	Rotax Max Wintercup — Junior		32nd
2016	Rotax Max Challenge Germany — Junior		13th

== Racing record ==
=== Racing career summary ===
Season	Series	Team	Races	Wins	Poles	F/Laps	Podiums	Points	Position
2016	ADAC Formula 4 Championship	RS Competition	24	0	0	0	0	0	41st
2016	Central European Zone Championship E2-1600	N/A	2	2	0	1	2	N/A	NC†
2017	ADAC Formula 4 Championship	Neuhauser Racing Team	21	0	0	0	0	33	17th
2017	Italian F4 Championship	ADM Motorsport	3	0	0	0	0	0	NC†
2017	Remus Formel 4 Trophy	N/A	2	2	?	?	2	25	5th
2017	Formula Renault NEC	Anders Motorsport	0	0	0	0	0	0	NC
2018	ADAC Formula 4 Championship	Neuhauser Racing Team	15	0	0	0	0	28	14th
2018	Italian F4 Championship	Van Amersfoort Racing	3	0	0	0	1	19	16th
2018–19	MRF Challenge Formula 2000	MRF Racing	15	2	0	0	5	181	4th
2019	FIA Formula 3 Championship	Jenzer Motorsport	16	0	0	0	0	0	26th
2019	Macau Grand Prix	Jenzer Motorsport	1	0	0	0	0	N/A	20th
2019	BRDC British Formula 3 Championship	Lanan Racing	6	0	0	0	0	41	18th
2019	Formula Regional European Championship	Van Amersfoort Racing	3	0	0	0	0	24	17th
2020	Euroformula Open Championship	Van Amersfoort Racing	18	0	0	0	6	177	**3rd**
2020	FIA Formula 3 Championship	Campos Racing	2	0	0	0	0	0	35th
2021	Euroformula Open Championship	Van Amersfoort Racing	3	0	0	0	0	6	21st

^{†} As Estner was a guest driver, he was ineligible to score points.
* Season still in progress.

=== Complete ADAC Formula 4 Championship results ===
(key) (Races in bold indicate pole position) (Races in italics indicate fastest lap)

Year	Team	1	2	3	4	5	6	7	8	9	10	11	12	13	14	15	16	17	18	19	20	21	22	23	24	Pos	Points
2016	RS Competition	OSC1; 1; 22	OSC1; 2; 28	OSC1; 3; 21	SAC; 1; 24	SAC; 2; 26	SAC; 3; 17	LAU; 1; 19	LAU; 2 Ret	LAU; 3 DNQ	OSC2; 1; 24	OSC2; 2; 28	OSC2; 3; 22	RBR; 1; 24	RBR; 2; 25	RBR; 3; 22	NÜR; 1; 23	NÜR; 2; 28	NÜR; 3; 21	ZAN; 1	ZAN; 2	ZAN; 3	HOC; 1; 21	HOC; 2 Ret	HOC; 3; 17	41st	0
2017	Neuhauser Racing	OSC1; 1; 17	OSC1; 2; 16	OSC1; 3; 10	LAU; 1; 12	LAU; 2; 20	LAU; 3; 4	RBR; 1; 20	RBR; 2 Ret	RBR; 3; 11	OSC2; 1; 13	OSC2; 2; 18	OSC2; 3; 14	NÜR; 1; 4	NÜR; 2; 4	NÜR; 3; 12	SAC; 1; 11	SAC; 2; 10	SAC; 3; 15	HOC; 1; 14	HOC; 2; 11	HOC; 3; 18				17th	33
2018	Neuhauser Racing	OSC; 1; 13	OSC; 2; 5	OSC; 3 Ret	HOC1; 1; 9	HOC1; 2; 16	HOC1; 3 Ret	LAU; 1; 5	LAU; 2 Ret	LAU; 3; 19	RBR; 1; 17	RBR; 2; 8	RBR; 3; 9	HOC2; 1; 16	HOC2; 2; 14	NÜR; 1	NÜR; 2	NÜR; 3	HOC3; 1	HOC3; 2	HOC3; 3					14th	28

=== Complete MRF Challenge Formula 2000 Championship results ===
(key) (Races in bold indicate pole position) (Races in italics indicate fastest lap)

Year	1	2	3	4	5	6	7	8	9	10	11	12	13	14	15	Pos	Points
2018-19	DUB; 1; 11	DUB; 2; 7	DUB; 3; 1	DUB; 4; 6	DUB; 5; 5	BHR; 1; 1	BHR; 2; 7	BHR; 3; 2	BHR; 4; 3	BHR; 5; 5	CHE; 1; 4	CHE; 2; 3	CHE; 3; 4	CHE; 4; 7	CHE; 5; 4	4th	181

=== Complete BRDC British Formula 3 Championship results ===
(key) (Races in bold indicate pole position; races in italics indicate points for the fastest lap of top ten finishers)

Year	Entrant	1	2	3	4	5	6	7	8	9	10	11	12	13	14	15	16	17	18	19	20	21	22	23	24	DC	Points
2019	Lanan Racing	OUL	OUL	OUL	SNE; 1	SNE; 2	SNE; 3	SIL1; 1; 15	SIL1; 2; 14	SIL1; 3; 15	DON1; 1	DON1; 2	DON1; 3	SPA; 1; 15	SPA; 2; 5	SPA; 3; 11	BRH; 1	BRH; 2	BRH; 3	SIL2; 1	SIL2; 2	SIL2; 3	DON2; 1	DON2; 2	DON2; 3	18th	41

=== Complete FIA Formula 3 Championship results ===
(key) (Races in bold indicate pole position; races in italics indicate points for the fastest lap of top ten finishers)

Year	Entrant	1	2	3	4	5	6	7	8	9	10	11	12	13	14	15	16	17	18	DC	Points
2019	Jenzer Motorsport	CAT; FEA; 25	CAT; SPR; 22	LEC; FEA; 11	LEC; SPR; 11	RBR; FEA; 23	RBR; SPR; 20	SIL; FEA; 23	SIL; SPR; 22	HUN; FEA; 21	HUN; SPR; 15	SPA; FEA; 23	SPA; SPR; 17	MNZ; FEA; 22	MNZ; SPR; 24	SOC; FEA; 24	SOC; SPR; 18			26th	0
2020	Campos Racing	RBR; FEA	RBR; SPR	RBR; FEA	RBR; SPR	HUN; FEA	HUN; SPR	SIL; FEA	SIL; SPR	SIL; FEA	SIL; SPR	CAT; FEA	CAT; SPR	SPA; FEA; 27	SPA; SPR; 20	MNZ; FEA	MNZ; SPR	MUG; FEA	MUG; SPR	35th	0

=== Complete Euroformula Open Championship results ===
(key) (Races in bold indicate pole position) (Races in italics indicate fastest lap)

Year	Team	1	2	3	4	5	6	7	8	9	10	11	12	13	14	15	16	17	18	19	20	21	22	23	24	Pos	Points
2020	Van Amersfoort Racing	HUN; 1; 2	HUN; 2; 2	LEC; 1; 3	LEC; 2; 4	RBR; 1; 4	RBR; 2 Ret	MNZ; 1; 6	MNZ; 2; 9	MNZ; 3; 4	MUG; 1; 2	MUG; 2 (10)	SPA; 1; 4	SPA; 2; 7	SPA; 3; 8	CAT; 1; 15	CAT; 2; 3	CAT; 3; 5	CAT; 4; 3							3rd	177
2021	Van Amersfoort Racing	POR; 1; 7	POR; 2; 11	POR; 3; 13	LEC; 1	LEC; 2	LEC; 3	SPA; 1	SPA; 2	SPA; 3	HUN; 1	HUN; 2	HUN; 3	IMO; 1	IMO; 2	IMO; 3	RBR; 1	RBR; 2	RBR; 3	MNZ; 1	MNZ; 2	MNZ; 3	CAT; 1	CAT; 2	CAT; 3	21st	6
