= Max Defourny =

Belgian racing driver

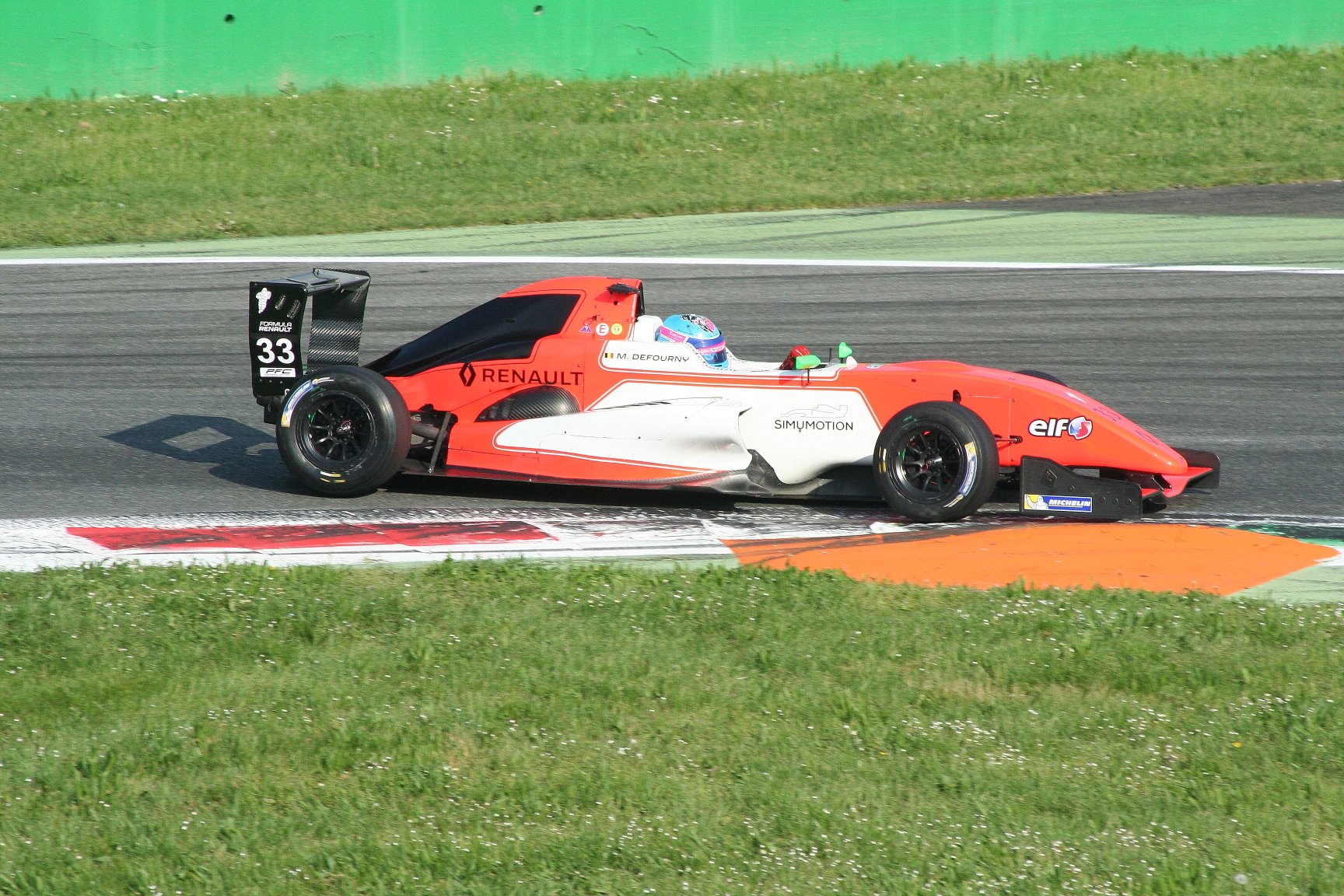
- Nationality: (Belgium) Belgian
- Born: Max Constant Andre Defourny; 9 October 1998 (age 28) Liège, Belgium

Eurocup Formula Renault 2.0 career
- Debut season: 2015
- Current team: MP Motorsport
- Categorisation: FIA Silver
- Car number: 33
- Former teams: R-ace GP
- Starts: 55
- Wins: 2
- Poles: 5
- Fastest laps: 10
- Best finish: 3rd in 2016

Previous series
- 2018-19 2015-17 2015 2014 2014: MRF Challenge Formula 2000; Formula Renault 2.0 NEC; Formula Renault 2.0 Alps; Italian F4 Championship; French F4 Championship

Max Constant Andre Defourny (born 9 October 1998) is a Belgian-born former professional racing driver based in Luxembourg, last competing in Formula Renault 2.0.

== Career ==
=== Karting ===
Born in Liège, Defourny began karting in 2009 at the age of eleven and took his first karting title the following year.

=== Formula 4 Championships ===
Defourny graduated to single-seaters in 2014, partaking in nine races of the French F4 Championship as a guest driver and three rounds of the Italian F4 Championship with Cram Motorsport, finishing 20th in the overall standings.

=== Formula Renault 2.0 ===
In 2015, Defourny graduated to the Formula Renault 2.0 series with the ART Junior Team, taking three victories and fourth place in Formula Renault 2.0 NEC.

Defourny remained with his previous outfit in 2016, following its rebadging as R-ace GP, and finished as vice-champion to Lando Norris in the Formula Renault 2.0 NEC and third in Eurocup Formula Renault 2.0.

Defourny stayed in R-ace GP in 2017. He was not able to improve his championship position, finishing fourth behind his teammates Will Palmer and Robert Shwartzman. He took only one win at Circuit Paul Ricard at Le Castellet after disqualification of Shwartzman. He collected eleven podiums in 2017, three more than in 2016. He entered the Indian-based MRF Challenge for the 2018-19 season, and despite leading the championship heading into the final round, he finished runner up to Jamie Chadwick.

=== Formula V8 3.5 ===
In November 2016, Defourny partook in post-season testing with Fortec Motorsports and AVF.

=== GP3 Series ===
Defourny drove at the post-season test at Yas Marina with ART Grand Prix and Arden International.

== Racing record ==
=== Career summary ===
Season	Series	Team	Races	Wins	Poles	F/Laps	Podiums	Points	Position
2014	French F4 Championship	Auto Sport Academy	9	0	0	0	0	0	NC†
2014	Italian F4 Championship	Cram Motorsport	3	0	0	0	0	9	20th
2014	Formula Renault 1.6 NEC	Provily Racing	2	0	0	0	0	207	5th
2014	Formula Renault 1.6 NEC	Lechner Racing School	11	0	0	0	2	207	5th
2015	Formula Renault 2.0 NEC	Strakka Racing	2	0	0	0	1	218	4th
2015	Formula Renault 2.0 NEC	ART Junior Team	14	2	1	2	3	218	4th
2015	Eurocup Formula Renault 2.0	ART Junior Team	7	0	0	0	0	0	NC†
2015	Formula Renault 2.0 Alps Series	Koiranen GP	4	0	0	0	0	0	NC†
2016	Eurocup Formula Renault 2.0	R-ace GP	15	1	3	5	8	188.5	**3rd**
2016	Formula Renault 2.0 NEC	R-ace GP	15	3	2	5	9	285	**2nd**
2017	Formula Renault Eurocup	R-ace GP	23	1	2	5	11	255	4th
2017	Formula Renault NEC	R-ace GP	3	0	0	1	2	0	NC†
2017	FIA Formula 3 European Championship	Van Amersfoort Racing	3	0	0	1	0	2	18th
2018	Formula Renault Eurocup	MP Motorsport	8	0	0	0	1	28	14th
2018	BRDC British Formula 3 Championship	Douglas Motorsport	4	0	0	0	0	32	23rd
2018–19	MRF Challenge Formula 2000 Championship	MRF Racing	15	3	3	6	9	243	**2nd**

^{†} As Defourny was a guest driver, he was ineligible for points.

=== Complete Formula Renault 2.0 Alps Series results ===
(key) (Races in bold indicate pole position; races in italics indicate fastest lap)

Year	Team	1	2	3	4	5	6	7	8	9	10	11	12	13	14	15	16	Pos	Points
2015	Koiranen GP	IMO; 1; 15	IMO; 2; 10	PAU; 1	PAU; 2	RBR; 1	RBR; 2	RBR; 3	SPA; 1	SPA; 2	MNZ; 1	MNZ; 2	MNZ; 3	MIS; 1	MIS; 2	JER; 1; 10	JER; 2; 5	NC†	0

† As Defourny was a guest driver, he was ineligible for points

=== Complete Eurocup Formula Renault 2.0 results ===
(key) (Races in bold indicate pole position; races in italics indicate fastest lap)

Year	Entrant	1	2	3	4	5	6	7	8	9	10	11	12	13	14	15	16	17	18	19	20	21	22	23	DC	Points
2015	ART Junior Team	ALC; 1	ALC; 2	ALC; 3	SPA; 1; 9	SPA; 2; 11	HUN; 1	HUN; 2	SIL; 1	SIL; 2	SIL; 3	NÜR; 1; 22	NÜR; 2; 15	LMS; 1	LMS; 2	JER; 1 Ret	JER; 2; 19	JER; 3; 12							NC†	0
2016	R-ace GP	**ALC**; **1**; 1	**ALC**; **2**; 4	ALC; 3; 2	MON; 1; 3	MNZ; 1; 8	MNZ; 2; 2	MNZ; 3; 4	RBR; 1; 2	RBR; 2; 2	LEC; 1; 4	LEC; 2; 2	SPA; 1; 11	**SPA**; **2**; 15	EST; 1 Ret	EST; 2; 3									3rd	188.5
2017	R-ace GP	MNZ; 1; 5	MNZ; 2; 3	**SIL**; **1** Ret	SIL; 2; 12	PAU; 1; 2	PAU; 2; 6	MON; 1; 3	MON; 2; 4	HUN; 1; 14	HUN; 2; 4	HUN; 3; 3	NÜR; 1; 2	NÜR; 2; 6	**RBR**; **1**; 3	RBR; 2; 8	LEC; 1; 1	LEC; 2; 2	SPA; 1; 4	SPA; 2; 2	SPA; 3; 3	CAT; 1; 6	CAT; 2 Ret	CAT; 3; 3	4th	255
2018	MP Motorsport	LEC; 1 Ret	LEC; 2; 10	MNZ; 1; 9	MNZ; 2; 3	SIL; 1; 16	SIL; 2; 14	MON; 1; 9	MON; 2; 6	RBR; 1	RBR; 2	SPA; 1	SPA; 2	HUN; 1	HUN; 2	NÜR; 1	NÜR; 2	HOC; 1	HOC; 2	CAT; 1	CAT; 2				14th	28

† As Defourny was a guest driver, he was ineligible for points

=== Complete Formula Renault 2.0 NEC results ===
(key) (Races in bold indicate pole position) (Races in italics indicate fastest lap)

Year	Entrant	1	2	3	4	5	6	7	8	9	10	11	12	13	14	15	16	DC	Points
2015	Strakka Racing	MNZ; 1; 3	MNZ; 2; 8															4th	218
2015	ART Junior Team			SIL; 1 Ret	SIL; 2; 8	RBR; 1; 8	RBR; 2; 8	RBR; 3 Ret	**SPA**; **1**; 1	SPA; 2; 2	ASS; 1; 18	ASS; 2; 8	NÜR; 1; 6	NÜR; 2; 1	HOC; 1; 7	HOC; 2; 9	HOC; 3; 4	4th	218
2016	R-ace GP	MNZ; 1; 19	**MNZ**; **2**; 1	**SIL**; **1**; 1	SIL; 2; 5	HUN; 1; 10	HUN; 2; 7	SPA; 1 Ret	SPA; 2; 2	ASS; 1; 5	ASS; 2; 1	NÜR; 1; 3	NÜR; 2; 2	HOC; 1; 3	HOC; 2; 2	HOC; 3; 2		2nd	285
2017	R-ace GP	MNZ; 1	MNZ; 2	ASS; 1	ASS; 2	NÜR; 1	NÜR; 2	SPA; 1; 4	SPA; 2; 2	SPA; 3; 3	HOC; 1	HOC; 2						NC†	0

† As Defourny was a guest driver, he was ineligible for points

=== Complete FIA Formula 3 European Championship results ===
(key) (Races in bold indicate pole position) (Races in italics indicate fastest lap)

Year	Entrant	Engine	1	2	3	4	5	6	7	8	9	10	11	12	13	14	15	16	17	18	19	20	21	22	23	24	25	26	27	28	29	30	DC	Points
2017	Van Amersfoort Racing	Mercedes	SIL; 1	SIL; 2	SIL; 3	MNZ; 1	MNZ; 2	MNZ; 3	PAU; 1	PAU; 2	PAU; 3	HUN; 1	HUN; 2	HUN; 3	NOR; 1	NOR; 2	NOR; 3	SPA; 1	SPA; 2	SPA; 3	ZAN; 1	ZAN; 2	ZAN; 3	NÜR; 1; 11	NÜR; 2; 18	NÜR; 3; 9	RBR; 1	RBR; 2	RBR; 3	HOC; 1	HOC; 2	HOC; 3	18th	2
