= Toby Sowery =

British racing driver (born 1996)

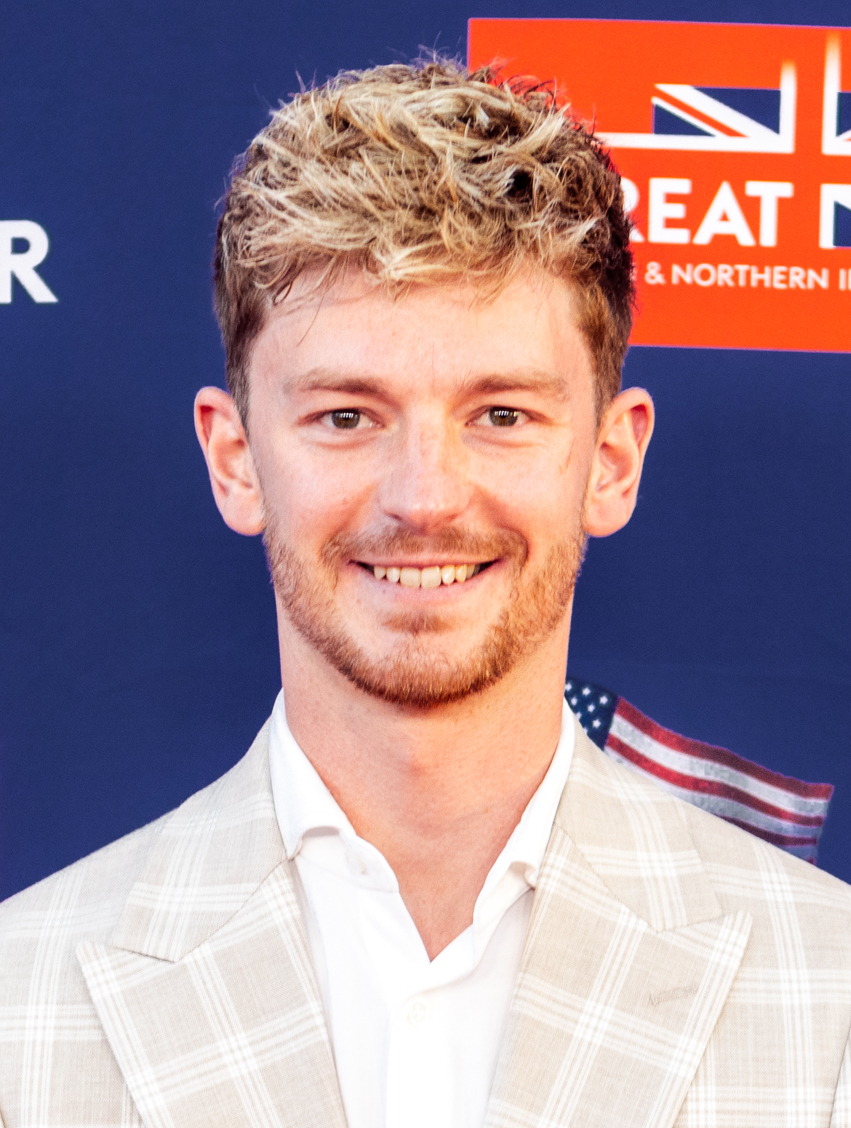
- Sowery in 2026
- Nationality: (United Kingdom) British
- Born: Toby Dion Elwyn Sowery; 30 June 1996 (age 30) Melbourn, Cambridgeshire, England
- Categorisation: FIA Silver

IndyCar Series career
- 3 races run over 1 year
- Best finish: 31st (2024)
- First race: 2024 Honda Indy 200 (Mid-Ohio)
- Last race: 2024 Grand Prix of Portland (Portland)
Wins	Podiums	Poles
0	0	0

Previous series
- 2016–17 2014–17 2015 2014: BRDC British Formula 3 Championship; MRF Challenge; MSA Formula; MSV F3 Cup

Championship titles
- 2026 2014–15 2014: Michelin Endurance Cup; MRF Challenge; MSV F3 Cup

Toby Dion Elwyn Sowery (born 30 June 1996) is a British racing driver who currently competes in the IMSA SportsCar Championship in LMP2 for CrowdStrike Racing by APR. He is also the reserve driver for IndyCar Series team A. J. Foyt Enterprises, having previously raced for Dale Coyne Racing.

== Career ==
=== Karting ===
Born in Melbourn, Sowery began karting in 2004 at the age of eight and claimed titles in Easykart, Junior TKM and Junior Rotax GP.

=== Lower Formulae ===
In 2014, Sowery graduated to single-seaters, beginning with the MSV F3 Cup, where he took the title with ten race wins and fourteen podiums. Later that year, Sowery partook in the MRF Challenge, in which he also claimed the title.

The following year, Sowery entered a few races MSA Formula with MBM Motorsport, where he finished fourteenth with eighty points.

In 2016, Sowery graduated to British F3 with Lanan Racing. There he claimed five victories and led the standings for a time before finishing third behind eventual champion Matheus Leist.

Sowery returned to the MRF Challenge in 2016-17, but only as a development driver working on future upgrades for the Championship.

== Racing record ==
=== Career summary ===
Season	Series	Team	Races	Wins	Poles	F/Laps	Podiums	Points	Position
2014	MSV F3 Cup	Lanan Racing	14	10	10	10	14	396	**1st**
2014-15	MRF Challenge Formula 2000 Championship	MRF Racing	12	4	1	3	9	221	**1st**
2015	MSA Formula Championship	Fortec Motorsports	6	0	0	0	0	80	14th
2015	MSA Formula Championship	MBM Motorsport	9	0	0	0	1	80	14th
2016	BRDC British Formula 3 Championship	Lanan Racing	23	5	2	5	10	457	**3rd**
2016-17	MRF Challenge Formula 2000 Championship	MRF Racing	10	0	0	0	0	0	NC†
2017	BRDC British Formula 3 Championship	Lanan Racing	21	2	2	6	11	432	4th
2017	U.S. F2000 National Championship	Team Benik	2	0	0	0	0	27	26th
2017	Lamborghini Super Trofeo Asia - Pro	Team Lazarus	10	1	0	2	7	91	4th
2017	Lamborghini Super Trofeo World Final - Pro	Team Lazarus	2	0	0	0	0	?	?
2018	International GT Open	Daiko Lazarus Racing	14	0	1	0	0	2	42nd
2018	International GT Open - Pro-Am	Daiko Lazarus Racing	14	0	1	0	1	14	13th
2018	Blancpain GT Series Endurance Cup	Daiko Lazarus Racing	1	0	0	0	0	0	NC
2018	Italian F4 Championship	KDC Racing	6	0	0	0	2	54	12th
2018	Pro Mazda Championship	BN Racing	2	0	0	1	2	51	16th
2019	Indy Lights	BN Racing/Team Pelfrey	13	0	0	0	4	367	**3rd**
2019	Indy Lights	HMD Motorsports/Team Pelfrey	5	1	0	1	3	367	**3rd**
2021	Indy Lights	Juncos Racing	14	0	0	1	3	236	9th
2022	Radical World Finals - Pro 1500	Valour Racing	1	1	1	1	1	N/A	**1st**
2023	Indy NXT	HMD Motorsports	3	0	0	0	1	65	23rd
2023–24	Asian Le Mans Series - LMP2	Algarve Pro Racing	5	1	0	0	1	45	7th
2024	IMSA SportsCar Championship - LMP2	CrowdStrike Racing by APR	3	0	0	1	1	800	29th
2024	GT World Challenge Europe Endurance Cup	Century Motorsport	5	0	0	0	0	6	26th
2024	IndyCar Series	Dale Coyne Racing with Rick Ware Racing	2	0	0	0	0	32	31st
2025	IMSA SportsCar Championship - LMP2	CrowdStrike Racing by APR	5	0	0	1	1	1328	25th
2025	Middle East Trophy - GT3	Paradine Competition	1	0	0	0	0	0	NC
2025	GT World Challenge Europe Endurance Cup	Paradine Competition	1	0	0	0	0	0	NC
2025	IndyCar Series	Rahal Letterman Lanigan Racing	Reserve and development driver						
2026	IMSA SportsCar Championship - LMP2	CrowdStrike Racing by APR	5	2	1	1	4	1729	11th
2026	IndyCar Series	A. J. Foyt Enterprises	Reserve driver						

^{†} As Sowery was a guest driver, he was ineligible for championship points.

=== Complete MRF Challenge Formula 2000 results ===
(key) (Races in bold indicate pole position) (Races in italics indicate fastest lap)

Year	1	2	3	4	5	6	7	8	9	10	11	12	DC	Points
2014–15	LOS; 1; 1	LOS; 2; 3	LOS; 3; 3	LOS; 4; 1	BHR; 1; 5	BHR; 2; 2	BHR; 3; 3	BHR; 4; 4	MMR; 1; 1	MMR; 2; 1	MMR; 3; 2	MMR; 4; 5	1st	221

=== Complete MSA Formula results ===
(key) (Races in bold indicate pole position; races in italics indicate fastest lap)

Year	Team	1	2	3	4	5	6	7	8	9	10	11	12	13	14	15	16	17	18	19	20	21	22	23	24	25	26	27	28	29	30	DC	Points
2015	Fortec Motorsports	BHI; 1	BHI; 2	BHI; 3	DON; 1	DON; 2	DON; 3	THR; 1	THR; 2	THR; 3	OUL; 1 Ret	OUL; 2; 14	OUL; 3; 6	CRO; 1	CRO; 2	CRO; 3	SNE; 1; 11	SNE; 2; 4	SNE; 3 Ret	KNO; 1	KNO; 2	KNO; 3										14th	80
2015	MBM Motorsport																						ROC; 1 Ret	ROC; 2; 9	ROC; 3; 4	SIL; 1; 3	SIL; 2; 12	SIL; 3 Ret	BHGP; 1; 8	BHGP; 2; 4	BHGP; 3; 4	14th	80

=== Complete BRDC British Formula 3 Championship results ===
(key) (Races in bold indicate pole position; races in italics indicate fastest lap)

Year	Team	1	2	3	4	5	6	7	8	9	10	11	12	13	14	15	16	17	18	19	20	21	22	23	24	DC	Points
2016	Lanan Racing	SNE; 1; 4	SNE; 2; 3	SNE; 3; 2	BRH; 1; 3	BRH; 2; 1	BRH; 3; 13	ROC; 1; 14	ROC; 2; 8	ROC; 3; 6	OUL; 1; 7	OUL; 2; 1	OUL; 3; 7	SIL; 1; 7	SIL; 2; 1	SIL; 3 C	SPA; 1; 5	SPA; 2; 2	SPA; 3; 4	SNE; 1; 3	SNE; 2; 5	SNE; 3; 7	DON; 1; 4	DON; 2; 1	DON; 3; 1	3rd	457
2017	Lanan Racing	OUL; 1; 3	OUL; 2 Ret	OUL; 3; 7	ROC; 1; 10	ROC; 2; 6	ROC; 3; 4	SNE; 1; 3	SNE; 2; 5	SNE; 3; 2	**SIL**; **1**; 1	SIL; 2; 2	**SIL**; **3**; 1	SPA; 1; 4	SPA; 2; 3	SPA; 3; 2	BRH; 1; 3	BRH; 2 DSQ	BRH; 3; 7	SNE; 1; 2	SNE; 2; 4	SNE; 3; 2	DON; 1	DON; 2	DON; 3	4th	432

=== Complete Italian F4 Championship results ===
(key) (Races in bold indicate pole position; races in italics indicate fastest lap)

Year	Team	1	2	3	4	5	6	7	8	9	10	11	12	13	14	15	16	17	18	19	20	21	DC	Points
2018	KDC Racing	ADR; 1; 4	ADR; 2; 21	ADR; 3; 4	LEC; 1; 3	LEC; 2; 12	LEC; 3; 3	MNZ; 1	MNZ; 2	MNZ; 3	MIS; 1	MIS; 2	MIS; 3	IMO; 1	IMO; 2	IMO; 3	VLL; 1	VLL; 2	VLL; 3	MUG; 1	MUG; 2	MUG; 3	12th	54

=== Complete International GT Open results ===
(key) (Races in bold indicate pole position; results in italics indicate fastest lap)

Year	Team	Car	1	2	3	4	5	6	7	8	9	10	11	12	13	14	Pos.	Points
2018	Daiko Lazarus Racing	Lamborghini Huracán GT3	EST; 1; 19	**EST**; **2**; 12	LEC; 1; 14	LEC; 2; 9	SPA; 1; 20	SPA; 2; 19	HUN; 1; 12	HUN; 2 Ret	SIL; 1; 18	SIL; 2; 15	MNZ; 1 Ret	MNZ; 2; 13	CAT; 1; 26	CAT; 2; 15	42nd	2

=== American open-wheel racing results ===
==== U.S. F2000 National Championship results ====
Year	Team	1	2	3	4	5	6	7	8	9	10	11	12	13	14	Rank	Points
2017	Team BENIK	STP	STP	BAR; 11	BAR; 5	IMS	IMS	RDA	RDA	IOW	TOR	TOR	MOH	MOH	WGL	26th	27

==== Pro Mazda Championship ====
Year	Team	1	2	3	4	5	6	7	8	9	10	11	12	13	14	15	16	Rank	Points
2018	RP Motorsport	STP	STP	BAR	BAR	IMS	IMS	LOR	RDA; 2	RDA; 2	TOR	TOR	MOH	MOH	GMP	POR	POR	16th	51

==== Indy NXT ====
Year	Team	1	2	3	4	5	6	7	8	9	10	11	12	13	14	15	16	17	18	19	20	Rank	Points
2019	BN Racing Team Pelfrey	STP; 2	STP; 3	COA; 5	COA; 6	IMS; 7	IMS; 5	INDY; 4	RDA; 4	RDA; 8	TOR; 5	TOR; 2	MOH; 9	MOH; 2								3rd	367
2019	HMD Motorsport Team Pelfrey														GTW; 8	POR; 4	POR; 1	LAG; 2	LAG; 3			3rd	367
2021	Juncos Racing	ALA; 4	ALA; 4	STP; 13	STP; 9	IMS; 3	IMS; 2	DET; 3	DET; 4	RDA; 5	RDA; 13	MOH; 6	MOH; 6	GTW; 11	GTW; 8	POR	POR	LAG	LAG	MOH	MOH	9th	236
2023	HMD Motorsports	STP	BAR; 3	IMS	DET; 17	DET; 13	RDA	MOH	IOW	NSH	IMS	GMP	POR	LAG	LAG							23rd	65

==== IndyCar Series ====
(key) (Races in bold indicate pole position; races in italics indicate fastest lap)

Year	Team	No.	Chassis	Engine	1	2	3	4	5	6	7	8	9	10	11	12	13	14	15	16	17	18	Rank	Points	Ref
2024	Dale Coyne Racing w/ Rick Ware Racing	51	Dallara DW12	Honda	STP	THE	LBH	ALA	IMS	INDY	DET	ROA	LAG	MOH; 13	IOW	IOW	TOR; 15	GTW	POR; 17	MIL	MIL	NSH	31st	45	

=== Complete Asian Le Mans Series results ===
(key) (Races in bold indicate pole position) (Races in italics indicate fastest lap)

Year	Team	Class	Car	Engine	1	2	3	4	5	Pos.	Points
2023–24	Algarve Pro Racing	LMP2	Oreca 07	Gibson GK428 4.2 L V8	SEP; 1; 8	SEP; 2; 9	DUB; 6	ABU; 1; 7	ABU; 2; 1	7th	45

=== Complete IMSA SportsCar Championship results ===
(key) (Races in bold indicate pole position; results in italics indicate fastest lap)

Year	Team	Class	Make	Engine	1	2	3	4	5	6	7	Pos.	Points
2024	CrowdStrike Racing by APR	LMP2	Oreca 07	Gibson GK428 4.2 L V8	DAY; 2	SEB; 9	WGL; 13	MOS	ELK	IMS	PET	29th	800
2025	CrowdStrike Racing by APR	LMP2	Oreca 07	Gibson GK428 4.2 L V8	DAY; 6	SEB; 6	WGL; 3	MOS	ELK	IMS; 10	PET; 10	25th	1328
2026	CrowdStrike Racing by APR	LMP2	Oreca 07	Gibson GK428 4.2 L V8	DAY; 1	SEB; 5	WGL; 2	MOS	ELK; 2	IMS	PET; 1	11th	1729

Sporting positions
Preceded by Rupert Svendsen-Cook	MRF Challenge Formula 2000; Champion; 2014–15	Succeeded by Pietro Fittipaldi
Preceded by Mikkel Jensen; Steven Thomas; Hunter McElrea	Michelin Endurance Cup; LMP2 Champion; 2026; With: George Kurtz & Alex Quinn	Succeeded by Incumbent
