= Jack Butel =

British racing driver (born 1996)

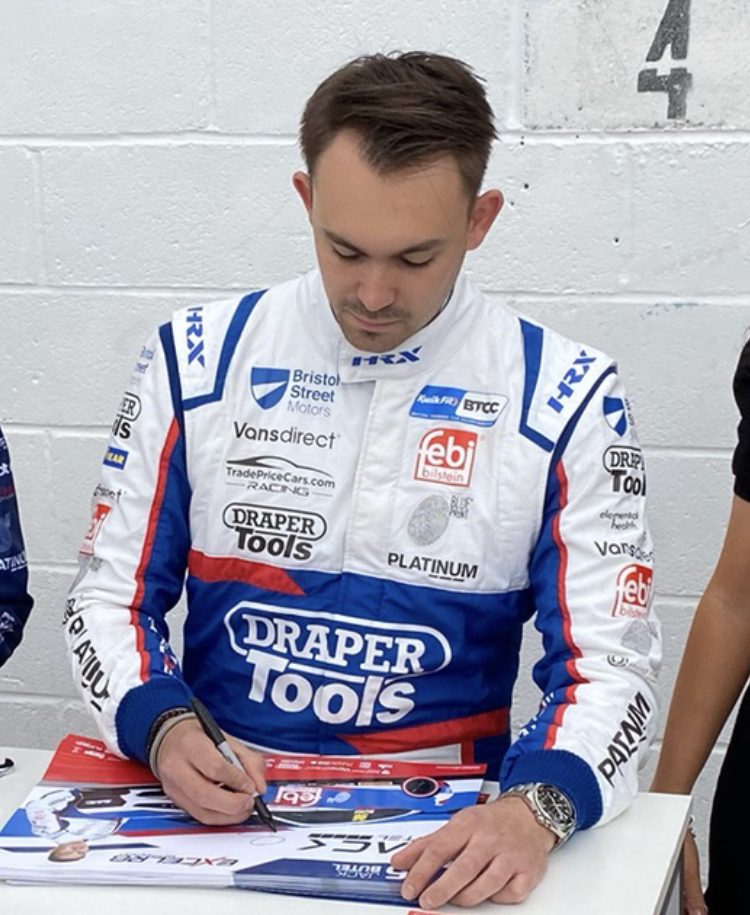
- Butel at Thruxton in 2022.
- Nationality: (United Kingdom) British
- Born: 19 March 1996 (age 30) St Saviour, Jersey

British Touring Car Championship career
- Debut season: 2020
- Categorisation: FIA Silver
- Car number: 96
- Former teams: Ciceley Motorsport; Excelr8 with TradePriceCars.com; Go-Fix with Autoaid Breakdown
- Starts: 107 (108 entries)
- Wins: 0
- Poles: 0
- Fastest laps: 0
- Best finish: 25th in 2021

Previous series
- 2019 2017-18 2015-16 2014: British GT Championship; LMP3 Cup UK; F4 British Championship; Formula Renault BARC

Jack Butel (born 19 March 1996 in St Saviour, Jersey) is a British racing driver who last competed in the 2024 Porsche Carrera Cup Great Britain, driving for Toro Verde GT. He debuted in 2020 after previously competing in the British GT Championship and F4 British Championship.

== Career ==
=== British Touring Car Championship ===
==== Cicely Motorsport (2020) ====
Butel made his debut in the British Touring Car Championship in 2020 with Cicely Motorsport, driving a Mercedes-Benz A-Class. His first and only points finish of the season came during the second round at Brands Hatch, with 14th place in the third race of the weekend. He came 26th in the overall standings, and third in the Jack Sears Trophy.

==== EXCELR8 Motorsport (2021-2022) ====
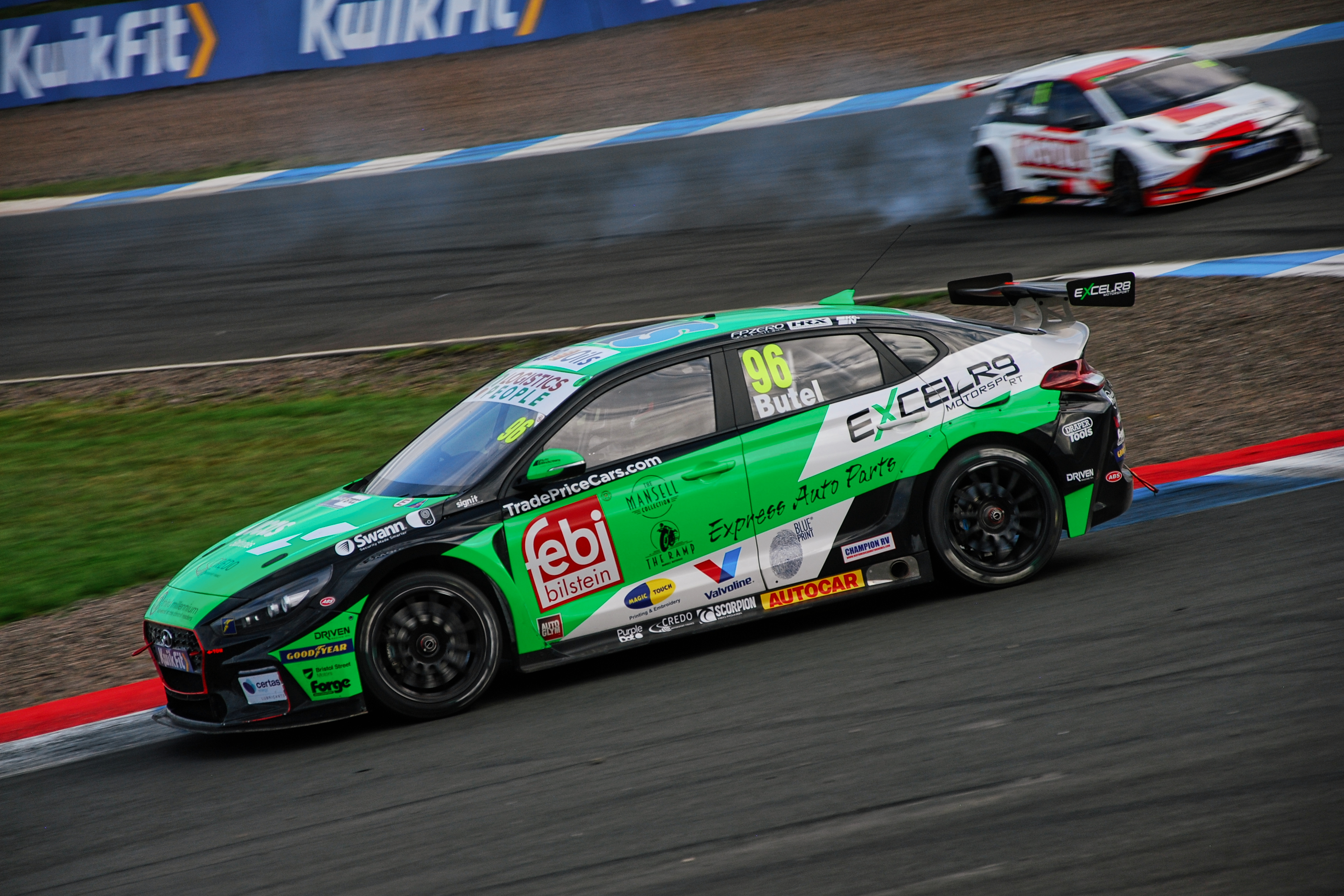
Butel racing at Knockhill during the 2021 British Touring Car Championship.

Butel moved to Excelr8 Motorsport for the 2021 season, driving a Hyundai i30 Fastback N Performance. He scored 4 points across the season, but was forced to miss the final round on medical grounds. He came 25th in the overall standings, and fourth in the Jack Sears Trophy.

Butel continued with the team for 2022, but missed the fifth round at Croft Circuit for personal reasons. With a best finish of 15th place once across the season and with one point scored, he finished 27th in the overall standings, and seventh in the Jack Sears Trophy.

==== Team HARD (2023-) ====
For 2023, Butel moved to Team HARD, driving a Cupra León.

== Racing record ==
=== Racing career summary ===
Season	Series	Team	Races	Wins	Poles	F/Laps	Podiums	Points	Position
2014	Protyre Formula Renault Championship	SWB Motorsport	15	0	0	0	0	175	8th
2015	MSA Formula Championship	SWB Motorsport	30	0	0	0	0	38	18th
2016	F4 British Championship	JHR Developments	27	0	0	0	0	14	18th
2017	British LMP3 Cup	Speedworks Motorsport	12	1	0	0	4	154	**3rd**
2018	24H Proto Series - Championship of the Continents - P3	Speedworks Motorsport	3	2	1	1	3	47	**2nd**
2019	Lamborghini Super Trofeo World Final - Pro-Am	ArtLine Team Georgia	2	0	0	0	0	4	10th
2019	Lamborghini Super Trofeo Europe - Pro-Am	ArtLine Team Georgia	4	0	0	0	1	34	7th
2019	British GT Championship - GT4	Optimum Motorsport	9	0	0	0	0	3.5	23rd
2019	24H GT Series - GT4	Optimum Motorsport							
2019	24 Hours of Dubai - GT4	Optimum Motorsport	1	0	0	0	0	N/A	8th
2020	24H GT Series - GT4	Ciceley Motorsport							
2020	24 Hours of Dubai - GT4	Ciceley Motorsport	1	0	0	0	0	N/A	6th
2020	British Touring Car Championship	Carlube TripleR Racing with Mac Tools	27	0	0	0	0	2	26th
2021	British Touring Car Championship	EXCELR8 with TradePriceCars.com	27	0	0	0	0	4	25th
2022	British Touring Car Championship	Bristol Street Motors with EXCELR8 TradePriceCars.com	26	0	0	0	0	1	27th
2023	British Touring Car Championship	Go-Fix with Autoaid Breakdown	27	0	0	0	0	0	28th
2024	Porsche Carrera Cup Great Britain - Pro-Am	Toro Verde GT	4	0	0	0	0	9	10th

=== Complete Protyre Formula Renault Championship results ===
(key) (Races in bold indicate pole position) (Races in italics indicate fastest lap)

Year	Team	1	2	3	4	5	6	7	8	9	10	11	12	13	14	15	DC	Points
2014	SWB Motorsport	ROC; 1; 11	ROC; 2; 14	ROC; 3; 12	DON; 1; 13	DON; 2; 12	DON; 3; 12	BRH; 1; 9	BRH; 2; 10	SNE; 1; 8	SNE; 2; 10	SNE; 3; 8	CRO; 1; 7	CRO; 2; 8	SIL; 1; 9	SIL; 2; 7	8th	175

=== Complete MSA Formula Championship/F4 British Championship results ===
(key) (Races in bold indicate pole position) (Races in italics indicate fastest lap)

Year	Team	1	2	3	4	5	6	7	8	9	10	11	12	13	14	15	16	17	18	19	20	21	22	23	24	25	26	27	28	29	30	DC	Points
2015	SWB Motorsport	BHI; 1; 15	BHI; 2; 11	BHI; 3 Ret	DON; 1; 14	DON; 2; 12	DON; 3; 13	THR; 1; 13	THR; 2; 13	THR; 3 Ret	OUL; 1; 18	OUL; 2; 18	OUL; 3; 16																			18th	38
2015	JHR Developments													CRO; 1 Ret	CRO; 2; 16	CRO; 3; 16	SNE; 1; 17	SNE; 2; 9	SNE; 3; 16	KNO; 1; 16	KNO; 2; 9	KNO; 3; 13	ROC; 1 Ret	ROC; 2; 12	ROC; 3; 14	SIL; 1; 12	SIL; 2; 8	SIL; 3; 6	BHGP; 1; 12	BHGP; 2; 17	BHGP; 3; 14	18th	38
2016	JHR Developments	BHI; 1; 12	BHI; 2; 13	BHI; 3; 11	DON; 1 Ret	DON; 2; 7	DON; 3; 12	THR; 1; 7	THR; 2 Ret	THR; 3; 18	OUL; 1; 17	OUL; 2; 13	OUL; 3; 14	CRO; 1 Ret	CRO; 2; 12	CRO; 3; 16	SNE; 1; 14	SNE; 2; 13	SNE; 3; 13	KNO; 1	KNO; 2	KNO; 3	ROC; 1; 17	ROC; 2; 12	ROC; 3; 16	SIL; 1; 17	SIL; 2; 13	SIL; 3; 11	BHGP; 1; 9	BHGP; 2; 14	BHGP; 3; 14	18th	14

=== Complete British GT Championship results ===
(key) (Races in bold indicate pole position) (Races in italics indicate fastest lap)

Year	Team	Car	Class	1	2	3	4	5	6	7	8	9	DC	Points
2019	Optimum Motorsport	Aston Martin Vantage GT4	GT4	OUL; 1; 20	OUL; 2; 23	SNE; 1; 27	SNE; 2; 29	SIL; 1; 22	DON; 1 Ret	SPA; 1 Ret	BRH; 1; 28	DON; 1 Ret	23rd	3.5

=== Complete British Touring Car Championship results ===
(key) (Races in bold indicate pole position – 1 point awarded just in first race) (Races in italics indicate fastest lap – 1 point awarded all races) (* signifies that driver lead race for at least one lap – 1 point given all races)

Year	Team	Car	1	2	3	4	5	6	7	8	9	10	11	12	13	14	15	16	17	18	19	20	21	22	23	24	25	26	27	28	29	30	Pos	Points
2020	Carlube TripleR Racing with Mac Tools	Mercedes-Benz A-Class	DON; 1; 22	DON; 2; 19	DON; 3; 20	BRH; 1; 23	BRH; 2; 18	BRH; 3; 14	OUL; 1; 19	OUL; 2; 24	OUL; 3; 16	KNO; 1; 20	KNO; 2; 21	KNO; 3; 22	THR; 1; 19	THR; 2; 20	THR; 3; 18	SIL; 1; 20	SIL; 2; 17	SIL; 3; 17	CRO; 1 Ret	CRO; 2; 17	CRO; 3; 20	SNE; 1; 20	SNE; 2; 20	SNE; 3; 24	BRH; 1; 23	BRH; 2; 19	BRH; 3; 21				26th	2
2021	Excelr8 with TradePriceCars.com	Hyundai i30 Fastback N Performance	THR; 1; 21	THR; 2; 19	THR; 3; 19	SNE; 1; 26	SNE; 2; 22	SNE; 3; 21	BRH; 1; 25	BRH; 2; 25	BRH; 3; 21	OUL; 1; 20	OUL; 2; 17	OUL; 3 Ret	KNO; 1; 20	KNO; 2; 14	KNO; 3; 16	THR; 1; 19	THR; 2; 15	THR; 3; 15	CRO; 1; 23	CRO; 2; 26	CRO; 3; 19	SIL; 1; 18	SIL; 2; 16	SIL; 3; 23	DON; 1; 23	DON; 2; 25	DON; 3 Ret	BRH; 1	BRH; 2	BRH; 3	25th	4
2022	Bristol Street Motors with Excelr8 TradePriceCars.com	Hyundai i30 Fastback N Performance	DON; 1 Ret	DON; 2 Ret	DON; 3; 21	BRH; 1; 19	BRH; 2; 19	BRH; 3; 19	THR; 1 Ret	THR; 2 DNS	THR; 3; 23	OUL; 1; 24	OUL; 2; 23	OUL; 3; 19	CRO; 1	CRO; 2	CRO; 3	KNO; 1 Ret	KNO; 2; 23	KNO; 3; 22	SNE; 1; 22	SNE; 2; 19	SNE; 3 Ret	THR; 1; 20	THR; 2; 21	THR; 3; 15	SIL; 1 Ret	SIL; 2; 22	SIL; 3; 19	BRH; 1; 19	BRH; 2; 24	BRH; 3; 19	27th	1
2023	Go-Fix with Autoaid Breakdown	Cupra León	DON; 1; 23	DON; 2 Ret	DON; 3; 17	BRH; 1; 18	BRH; 2; 24	BRH; 3; 17	SNE; 1; 21	SNE; 2; 21	SNE; 3; 16	THR; 1 Ret	THR; 2; 20	THR; 3; 21	OUL; 1; 17	OUL; 2; 17	OUL; 3; 18	CRO; 1; 20	CRO; 2; 20	CRO; 3 Ret	KNO; 1; 19	KNO; 2; 20	KNO; 3; 22	DON; 1; 23	DON; 2 Ret	DON; 3; 21	SIL; 1; 21	SIL; 2; 25	SIL; 3; 24	BRH; 1	BRH; 2	BRH; 3	28th	0
