= Petru Florescu =

Romanian racing driver

- Nationality: (Romania) Romanian
- Born: Petru Gabriel Florescu; 4 January 1999 (age 27) Bucharest, Romania

Euroformula Open Championship career
- Debut season: 2016
- Current team: Fortec Motorsports
- Categorisation: FIA Silver
- Car number: 19
- Former teams: Campos Racing; Teo Martín Motorsport
- Starts: 26
- Wins: 0
- Poles: 1
- Fastest laps: 0
- Best finish: 10th in 2017

Previous series
- 2016 2015–16: Eurocup Formula Renault 2.0; MSA Formula

Petru Gabriel Florescu (born 4 January 1999 in Bucharest) is a Romanian former racing driver.

== Career ==
Florescu made his karting debut in 2007 at the age of eight. In 2015, he made his debut in the UK-based MSA Formula series, from Carlin, finishing sixth in his second season. In December 2016, Florescu was listed among the drivers partaking in GP3 post-season testing with Campos Racing. The following month, Campos signed him to their Euroformula Open division. A month later, Florescu was signed to Douglas Motorsport for the BRDC British Formula 3 Championship.

== Racing record ==
=== Career summary ===
| Season | Series | Team | Races | Wins | Poles | F/Laps | Podiums | Points | Position |
|---|---|---|---|---|---|---|---|---|---|
| 2015 | MSA Formula Championship | Carlin | 30 | 0 | 0 | 0 | 0 | 99 | 11th |
| 2016 | F4 British Championship | Carlin | 30 | 5 | 6 | 6 | 8 | 260 | 6th |
| 2016 | Euroformula Open Championship | Teo Martín Motorsport | 4 | 0 | 0 | 0 | 0 | 0 | 25th |
| 2016 | Spanish Formula 3 Championship | Teo Martín Motorsport | 2 | 0 | 0 | 0 | 0 | 0 | 23rd |
| 2016 | Eurocup Formula Renault 2.0 | AVF | 4 | 0 | 0 | 0 | 0 | 0 | 21st |
| 2017 | Euroformula Open Championship | Campos Racing | 6 | 0 | 0 | 0 | 0 | 45 | 10th |
| 2017 | Euroformula Open Championship | Fortec Motorsports | 10 | 0 | 0 | 0 | 0 | 45 | 10th |
| 2017 | Spanish Formula 3 Championship | Campos Racing | 2 | 0 | 0 | 0 | 0 | 50 | 7th |
| 2017 | Spanish Formula 3 Championship | Fortec Motorsports | 4 | 0 | 0 | 0 | 0 | 50 | 7th |
| 2017 | BRDC British Formula 3 Championship | Douglas Motorsport | 3 | 0 | 0 | 0 | 0 | 22 | 23rd |
| 2017 | FIA Formula 3 European Championship | Motopark | 6 | 0 | 0 | 0 | 0 | 0 | 23rd |
| 2018 | FIA Formula 3 European Championship | Fortec Motorsports | 15 | 0 | 0 | 0 | 0 | 0 | 24th |
| 2018 | Euroformula Open Championship | Fortec Motorsports | 4 | 0 | 1 | 0 | 0 | 21 | 13th |
| 2018 | Spanish Formula 3 Championship | Fortec Motorsports | 4 | 0 | 1 | 0 | 0 | 13 | 11th |
| 2019 | Euroformula Open Championship | Drivex School | 2 | 0 | 0 | 0 | 0 | 0 | 26th |
| 2019 | Toyota Racing Series | MTEC Motorsport | 14 | 0 | 0 | 0 | 0 | 98 | 16th |

== Motorsports career results ==
=== Complete MSA Formula Championship/British F4 Championship results ===
(key) (Races in bold indicate pole position) (Races in italics indicate fastest lap)

| Year | Team | 1 | 2 | 3 | 4 | 5 | 6 | 7 | 8 | 9 | 10 | 11 | 12 | 13 | 14 | 15 | 16 | 17 | 18 | 19 | 20 | 21 | 22 | 23 | 24 | 25 | 26 | 27 | 28 | 29 | 30 | DC | Points |
|---|---|---|---|---|---|---|---|---|---|---|---|---|---|---|---|---|---|---|---|---|---|---|---|---|---|---|---|---|---|---|---|---|---|
| 2015 | Carlin | BHI; 1; 13 | BHI; 2; 10 | BHI; 3; 11 | DON; 1; 10 | DON; 2; 18 | DON; 3; 15 | THR; 1 Ret | THR; 2; 14 | THR; 3; 5 | OUL; 1; 7 | OUL; 2; 15 | OUL; 3; 5 | CRO; 1 Ret | CRO; 2; 13 | CRO; 3; 4 | SNE; 1; 5 | SNE; 2; 11 | SNE; 3; 5 | KNO; 1; 14 | KNO; 2; 11 | KNO; 3 Ret | ROC; 1; 7 | ROC; 2; 11 | ROC; 3; 5 | SIL; 1; 13 | SIL; 2; 10 | SIL; 3; 7 | BHGP; 1; 9 | BHGP; 2; 11 | BHGP; 3; 12 | 11th | 99 |
| 2016 | Carlin | **BHI**; **1**; 1 | BHI; 2 Ret | **BHI**; **3**; 1 | DON; 1; 6 | DON; 2; 2 | DON; 3; 13 | **THR**; **1**; 1 | THR; 2; 13 | **THR**; **3**; 9 | OUL; 1; 2 | OUL; 2; 4 | **OUL**; **3**; 1 | CRO; 1 Ret | CRO; 2; 8 | CRO; 3; 9 | SNE; 1; 7 | SNE; 2; 1 | SNE; 3; 5 | **KNO**; **1** DSQ | KNO; 2 Ret | KNO; 3 EX | ROC; 1 Ret | ROC; 2; 7 | ROC; 3; 4 | SIL; 1; 5 | SIL; 2 Ret | SIL; 3; 17 | BHGP; 1; 6 | BHGP; 2; 2 | BHGP; 3; 8 | 6th | 260 |

=== Complete Eurocup Formula Renault 2.0 results ===
(key) (Races in bold indicate pole position) (Races in italics indicate fastest lap)

| Year | Team | 1 | 2 | 3 | 4 | 5 | 6 | 7 | 8 | 9 | 10 | 11 | 12 | 13 | 14 | 15 | DC | Points |
|---|---|---|---|---|---|---|---|---|---|---|---|---|---|---|---|---|---|---|
| 2016 | AVF by Adrián Vallés | ALC; 1 | ALC; 2 | ALC; 3 | MON; 17 | MNZ; 1; 15 | MNZ; 2; 17 | MNZ; 3; 15 | RBR; 1 | RBR; 2 | LEC; 1 | LEC; 2 | SPA; 1 | SPA; 2 | EST; 1 | EST; 2 | 21st | 0 |

=== Complete Euroformula Open Championship results ===
(key) (Races in bold indicate pole position) (Races in italics indicate fastest lap)

| Year | Team | 1 | 2 | 3 | 4 | 5 | 6 | 7 | 8 | 9 | 10 | 11 | 12 | 13 | 14 | 15 | 16 | 17 | 18 | DC | Points |
|---|---|---|---|---|---|---|---|---|---|---|---|---|---|---|---|---|---|---|---|---|---|
| 2016 | Teo Martín Motorsport | EST; 1; 14 | EST; 2; 19 | SPA; 1; 12 | SPA; 2; 16 | LEC; 1 | LEC; 2 | SIL; 1 | SIL; 2 | RBR; 1 | RBR; 2 | MNZ; 1 | MNZ; 2 | JER; 1 | JER; 2 | CAT; 1 | CAT; 2 | | | 25th | 0 |
| 2017 | Campos Racing | EST; 1; 6 | EST; 2; 7 | SPA; 1; 9 | SPA; 2; 8 | LEC; 1; 7 | LEC; 2; 6 | | | | | | | | | | | | | 10th | 45 |
| 2017 | Fortec Motorsports | | | | | | | HUN; 1; 7 | HUN; 2 Ret | SIL; 1 Ret | SIL; 2; 12 | MNZ; 1 Ret | MNZ; 2; 13 | JER; 1 Ret | JER; 2; 10 | CAT; 1; 13 | CAT; 2; 11 | | | 10th | 45 |
| 2018 | Fortec Motorsports | EST; 1 Ret | **EST**; **2**; 5 | LEC; 1 | LEC; 2 | SPA; 1 | SPA; 2 | HUN; 1 | HUN; 2 | SIL; 1 | SIL; 2 | MNZ; 1 | MNZ; 2 | | | | | | | 13th | 21 |
| 2018 | Campos Racing | | | | | | | | | | | | | JER; 1; 8 | JER; 2; 9 | CAT; 1 | CAT; 2 | | | 13th | 21 |
| 2019 | Drivex School | LEC; 1; 13 | LEC; 2; 18 | PAU; 1 | PAU; 2 | HOC; 1 | HOC; 2 | SPA; 1 | SPA; 2 | HUN; 1 | HUN; 2 | RBR; 1 | RBR; 2 | SIL; 1 | SIL; 2 | CAT; 1 | CAT; 2 | MNZ; 1 | MNZ; 2 | 26th | 0 |

=== Complete BRDC British Formula 3 Championship results ===
(key) (Races in bold indicate pole position) (Races in italics indicate fastest lap)

| Year | Team | 1 | 2 | 3 | 4 | 5 | 6 | 7 | 8 | 9 | 10 | 11 | 12 | 13 | 14 | 15 | 16 | 17 | 18 | 19 | 20 | 21 | 22 | 23 | 24 | DC | Points |
|---|---|---|---|---|---|---|---|---|---|---|---|---|---|---|---|---|---|---|---|---|---|---|---|---|---|---|---|
| 2017 | Douglas Motorsport | OUL; 1; 9 | OUL; 2 Ret | OUL; 3; 11 | ROC; 1 | ROC; 2 | ROC; 3 | SNE; 1 | SNE; 2 | SNE; 3 | SIL; 1 | SIL; 2 | SIL; 3 | SPA; 1 | SPA; 2 | SPA; 3 | BRH; 1 | BRH; 2 | BRH; 3 | SNE; 1 | SNE; 2 | SNE; 3 | DON; 1 | DON; 2 | DON; 3 | 23rd | 22 |

=== Complete FIA Formula 3 European Championship results ===
(key) (Races in bold indicate pole position) (Races in italics indicate fastest lap)

| Year | Entrant | Engine | 1 | 2 | 3 | 4 | 5 | 6 | 7 | 8 | 9 | 10 | 11 | 12 | 13 | 14 | 15 | 16 | 17 | 18 | 19 | 20 | 21 | 22 | 23 | 24 | 25 | 26 | 27 | 28 | 29 | 30 | DC | Points |
|---|---|---|---|---|---|---|---|---|---|---|---|---|---|---|---|---|---|---|---|---|---|---|---|---|---|---|---|---|---|---|---|---|---|---|
| 2017 | Motopark | Volkswagen | SIL; 1 | SIL; 2 | SIL; 3 | MNZ; 1 | MNZ; 2 | MNZ; 3 | PAU; 1 | PAU; 2 | PAU; 3 | HUN; 1 | HUN; 2 | HUN; 3 | NOR; 1 | NOR; 2 | NOR; 3 | SPA; 1 | SPA; 2 | SPA; 3 | ZAN; 1 | ZAN; 2 | ZAN; 3 | NÜR; 1; 18 | NÜR; 2; 20 | NÜR; 3; 17 | RBR; 1; 17 | RBR; 2; 18 | RBR; 3; 13 | HOC; 1 | HOC; 2 | HOC; 3 | 23rd | 0 |
| 2018 | Fortec Motorsports | Mercedes | PAU; 1 | PAU; 2 | PAU; 3 | HUN; 1; 21 | HUN; 2; 22 | HUN; 3; 19 | NOR; 1; 21 | NOR; 2; 19 | NOR; 3; 14 | ZAN; 1; 24 | ZAN; 2; 19 | ZAN; 3; 21 | SPA; 1; 15 | SPA; 2 Ret | SPA; 3; 19 | SIL; 1; 20 | SIL; 2; 20 | SIL; 3; 21 | MIS; 1 WD | MIS; 2 WD | MIS; 3 WD | NÜR; 1 | NÜR; 2 | NÜR; 3 | RBR; 1 | RBR; 2 | RBR; 3 | HOC; 1 | HOC; 2 | HOC; 3 | 24th | 0 |

=== Complete Toyota Racing Series results ===
(key) (Races in bold indicate pole position) (Races in italics indicate fastest lap)

| Year | Team | 1 | 2 | 3 | 4 | 5 | 6 | 7 | 8 | 9 | 10 | 11 | 12 | 13 | 14 | 15 | 16 | 17 | DC | Points |
|---|---|---|---|---|---|---|---|---|---|---|---|---|---|---|---|---|---|---|---|---|
| 2019 | MTEC Motorsport | HIG; 1; 12 | HIG; 2; 10 | HIG; 3 Ret | TER; 1 Ret | TER; 2 C | TER; 3 C | HMP; 1; 6 | HMP; 2; 10 | HMP; 3; 13 | HMP; 4; 13 | TAU; 1; 10 | TAU; 2; 11 | TAU; 3 Ret | TAU; 4; 11 | MAN; 1; 8 | MAN; 2 Ret | MAN; 3 DNS | 16th | 98 |
