= Nicolai Kjærgaard =

Danish racing driver (born 1999)

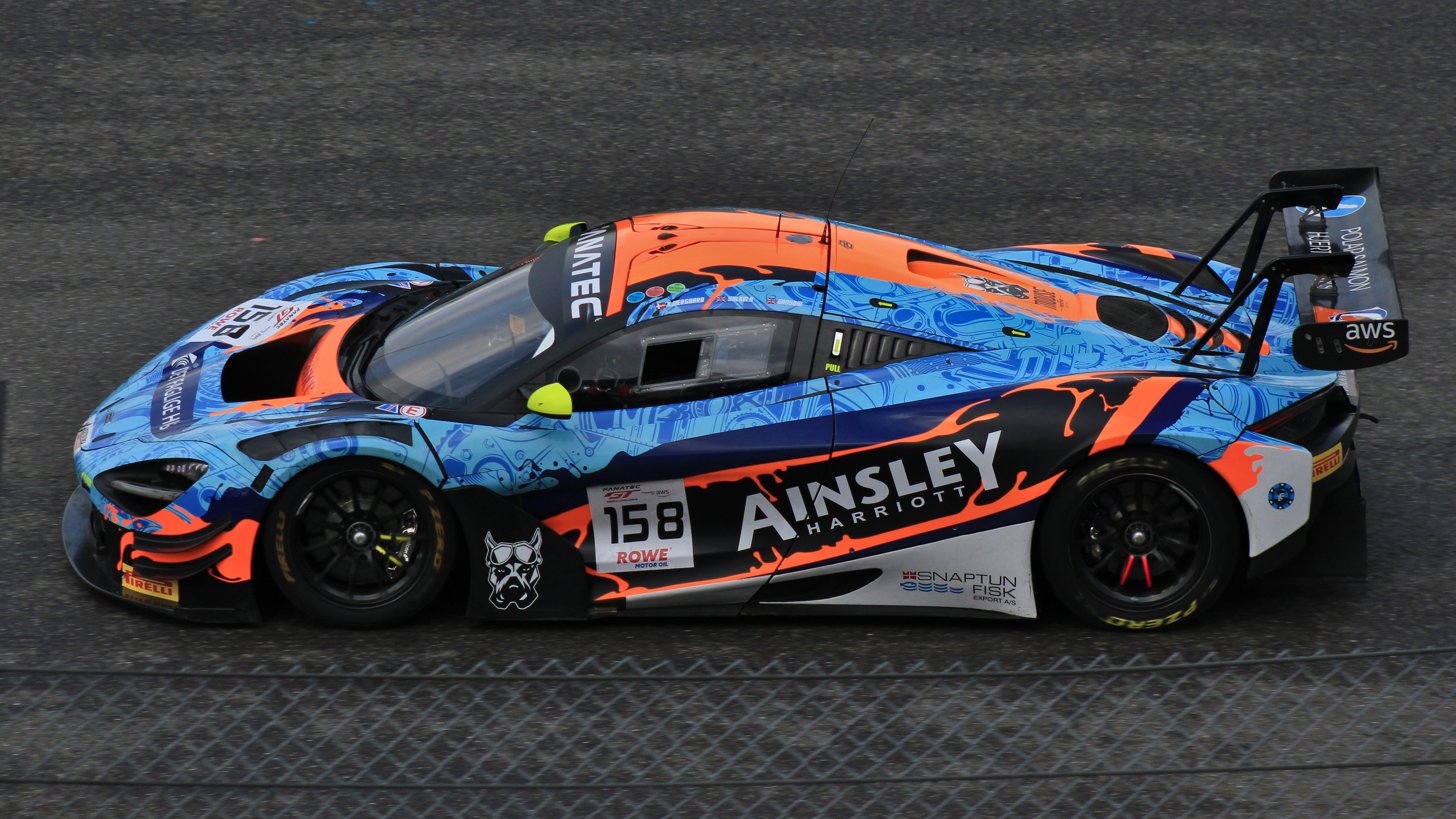
- Nationality: (Denmark) Danish
- Born: Nicolai Torsland Kjærgaard; 29 July 1999 (age 27) Esbjerg, Denmark

GTWC Europe Endurance Cup career
- Debut season: 2020
- Current team: Garage 59
- Categorisation: FIA Silver (until 2022); FIA Gold (2023–)
- Car number: 159
- Starts: 14 (14 entries)
- Wins: 0
- Podiums: 3
- Poles: 2
- Fastest laps: 0
- Best finish: 6th (Silver Cup) in 2022

Previous series
- 2022 2019 2017-2018 2016: Asian Le Mans Series; Euroformula Open Championship; BRDC F3 Championship; F4 British Championship

Nicolai Torsland Kjærgaard (born 29 July 1999) is a Danish racing driver who most recently competed in the GT World Challenge Europe Endurance Cup for Optimum Motorsport. Before making the move to sportscar racing in 2020, he was a BRDC British Formula 3 Championship runner-up and a Euroformula Open podium finisher.

== Racing record ==
=== Racing career summary ===
Season	Series	Team	Races	Wins	Poles	F/Laps	Podiums	Points	Position
2016	F4 British Championship	Fortec Motorsports	29	0	0	0	0	39	13th
2017	BRDC British Formula 3 Championship	Fortec Motorsports	24	0	0	0	0	247	10th
2017	Gentlemen Drivers Pre-66 GT Cars Championship	N/A	1	0	0	0	1	0	NC†
2018	BRDC British Formula 3 Championship	Carlin	23	5	3	5	10	446	**2nd**
2018	Gentlemen Drivers Pre-66 GT Cars Championship	N/A	1	0	0	0	1	0	NC†
2019	Euroformula Open Championship	Carlin Motorsport	18	0	0	1	5	111	7th
2019	Euroformula Open Winter Series	Carlin Motorsport	2	0	0	1	0	0	NC†
2020	GT World Challenge Europe Endurance Cup	Team Parker Racing	4	0	0	0	0	0	NC
2020	GT World Challenge Europe Endurance Cup - Silver	Team Parker Racing	4	0	0	0	0	23	17th
2020	Intercontinental GT Challenge	Team Parker Racing	1	0	0	0	0	0	NC
2020	Gentlemen Drivers Pre-66 GT Cars Championship	N/A	1	0	0	0	0	0	NC†
2021	GT World Challenge Europe Endurance Cup - Silver	Garage 59	5	0	1	0	1	32	14th
2021	GT World Challenge Europe Sprint Cup	Garage 59	10	0	0	0	0	0	NC
2021	GT World Challenge Europe Sprint Cup - Silver	Garage 59	10	0	0	0	0	19	13th
2021	Nürburgring Langstrecken Serie - SP8T	Walkenhorst Motorsport	2	0	0	0	1	0	NC†
2021	Nürburgring Langstrecken Serie - Cup 5 CS	Purple Dot Racing with Walkenhorst	2	0	0	0	0	0	NC†
2022	GT World Challenge Europe Endurance Cup	Garage 59	5	0	0	0	0	0	NC
2022	GT World Challenge Europe Endurance Cup - Silver	Garage 59	5	0	1	0	2	40	6th
2022	GT World Challenge Sprint Cup	Garage 59	2	0	0	0	0	4.5	21st
2022	GT World Challenge Sprint Cup - Silver	Garage 59	2	0	1	0	1	17.5	12th
2022	Asian Le Mans Series - GT	Garage 59	4	0	0	0	0	2	15th
2023	GT World Challenge Europe Endurance Cup	Garage 59	5	0	0	0	0	4	24th
2023	GT World Challenge Europe Sprint Cup	Garage 59	10	0	0	0	0	10	13th
2024	GT World Challenge Europe Endurance Cup	Garage 59	5	0	0	0	0	0	NC

^{†} As Kjaergaard was a guest driver, he was ineligible to score points. * Season still in progress.

=== Complete F4 British Championship results ===
(key) (Races in bold indicate pole position; races in italics indicate fastest lap)

Year	Team	1	2	3	4	5	6	7	8	9	10	11	12	13	14	15	16	17	18	19	20	21	22	23	24	25	26	27	28	29	30	DC	Points
2016	Fortec Motorsports	BHI; 1; 13	BHI; 2; 10	BHI; 3; 16	DON; 1; 14	DON; 2 Ret	DON; 3; 14	THR; 1 Ret	THR; 2 Ret	THR; 3; 14	OUL; 1; 14	OUL; 2; 15	OUL; 3; 7	CRO; 1 EX	CRO; 2; 10	CRO; 3; 11	SNE; 1; 6	SNE; 2; 4	SNE; 3; 6	KNO; 1; 6	KNO; 2; 11	KNO; 3; 10	ROC; 1; 8	ROC; 2; 11	ROC; 3; 18	SIL; 1; 10	SIL; 2 Ret	SIL; 3; 14	BHGP; 1; 11	BHGP; 2; 9	BHGP; 3; 12	13th	50

=== Complete BRDC British Formula 3 Championship results ===
(key) (Races in bold indicate pole position; races in italics indicate fastest lap)

Year	Team	1	2	3	4	5	6	7	8	9	10	11	12	13	14	15	16	17	18	19	20	21	22	23	24	DC	Points
2017	Fortec Motorsports	OUL; 1; 12	OUL; 2; 5	OUL; 3; 8	ROC; 1; 7	ROC; 2 Ret	ROC; 3 Ret	SNE1; 1; 11	SNE1; 2; 8	SNE1; 3; 8	SIL; 1; 7	SIL; 2; 16	SIL; 3; 7	SPA; 1; 12	SPA; 2; 12	SPA; 3; 10	BRH; 1; 7	BRH; 2; 11	BRH; 3; 6	SNE2; 1; 15	SNE2; 2; 10	SNE2; 3; 12	DON; 1; 8	DON; 2 Ret	DON; 3; 8	10th	247
2018	Carlin	OUL; 1; 2	OUL; 2; 4^{11}	**OUL**; **3**; 1	ROC; 1 Ret	ROC; 2; 2^{11}	ROC; 3; 2	**SNE**; **1**; 1	SNE; 2 Ret	SNE; 3; 2	SIL1; 1; 6	SIL1; 2; 4^{8}	SIL1; 3; 4	SPA; 1; 5	SPA; 2; 12^{1}	SPA; 3 Ret	BHI; 1; 3	BHI; 2; 9^{4}	**BHI**; **3**; 1	DON; 1; 1	DON; 2; 10^{8}	DON; 3; 1	SIL2; 1 Ret	SIL2; 2; 17	SIL2; 3 C	2nd	446

=== Complete Euroformula Open Championship results ===
(key) (Races in bold indicate pole position) (Races in italics indicate fastest lap)

Year	Team	1	2	3	4	5	6	7	8	9	10	11	12	13	14	15	16	17	18	Pos	Points
2019	Carlin Motorsport	LEC; 1; 11	LEC; 2; 13	PAU; 1 Ret	PAU; 2; 2	HOC; 1; 9	HOC; 2; 6	SPA; 1; 20	SPA; 2; 13	HUN; 1; 15	HUN; 2; 9	RBR; 1 Ret	RBR; 2; 9	SIL; 1; 3	SIL; 2; 3	CAT; 1; 2	CAT; 2; 2	MNZ; 1; 4	MNZ; 2; 15	7th	111

=== Complete GT World Challenge results ===
==== GT World Challenge Europe Endurance Cup ====
(Races in bold indicate pole position) (Races in italics indicate fastest lap)

Year	Team	Car	Class	1	2	3	4	5	6	7	Pos.	Points
2020	Team Parker Racing	Bentley Continental GT3	Silver	IMO; 37	NÜR; 37	SPA; 6H; 37	SPA; 12H; 30	SPA; 24H; 28	LEC; Ret		17th	23
2021	Garage 59	Aston Martin Vantage AMR GT3	Silver	MNZ; 19	**LEC**; 27	SPA; 6H; 31	SPA; 12H; 22	SPA; 24H; 14	NÜR; 19	CAT; 30	14th	32
2022	Garage 59	McLaren 720S GT3	Silver	IMO; 20	LEC; Ret	SPA; 6H; 43	SPA; 12H; Ret	SPA; 24H; Ret	HOC; 18	**CAT**; 12	6th	40
2023	Garage 59	McLaren 720S GT3 Evo	Pro	MNZ; 19	LEC; 12	SPA; 6H; 10	SPA; 12H; 59†	SPA; 24H; Ret	NÜR; 13	CAT; 8	24th	4
2024	Garage 59	McLaren 720S GT3 Evo	Bronze	LEC; 43	SPA; 6H; 56	SPA; 12H; 52	SPA; 24H; 38	NÜR; 43	MNZ; Ret	JED; 22	23rd*	19*

^{*}Season still in progress.

==== GT World Challenge Europe Sprint Cup ====
(key) (Races in bold indicate pole position) (Races in italics indicate fastest lap)

Year	Team	Car	Class	1	2	3	4	5	6	7	8	9	10	Pos.	Points
2021	Garage 59	Aston Martin Vantage AMR GT3	Silver	MAG; 1; 15	MAG; 2; 25	ZAN; 1; 24	ZAN; 2; 13	MIS; 1 Ret	MIS; 2; 13	BRH; 1; 24	BRH; 2; 19	VAL; 1 Ret	VAL; 2; 19	13th	19
2022	Garage 59	McLaren 720S GT3	Silver	BRH; 1	BRH; 2	MAG; 1	MAG; 2	ZAN; 1	ZAN; 2	MIS; 1	MIS; 2	VAL; 1; 14	**VAL**; **2**; 6	12th	17.5
2023	Garage 59	McLaren 720S GT3 Evo	Pro	BRH; 1; 16	BRH; 2; 4	MIS; 1 Ret	MIS; 2; 10	HOC; 1 Ret	HOC; 2; 34†	VAL; 1; 9	VAL; 2; 15	ZAN; 1; 17	ZAN; 2; 9	13th	10

^{*} Season still in progress.
