= 2017 BRDC British Formula 3 Championship =

Motor racing competition

The 2017 BRDC British Formula 3 Championship is a motor racing championship for open wheel, formula racing cars held across England and Belgium. The season began at Oulton Park on 15 April and ended on 25 September at Donington Park, after eight triple header events for a total of twenty-four races.

== Teams and drivers ==
All teams were British-registered.

Team	No.	Driver	Rounds
Chris Dittmann Racing	4	(United Kingdom) Omar Ismail	1–7
Chris Dittmann Racing	6	(France) Tristan Charpentier	1, 5
Chris Dittmann Racing	8	(Kenya) Jeremy Wahome	1–6, 8
Double R Racing	5	(India) Krishnaraaj Mahadik	6–7
Double R Racing	7	(Brazil) Guilherme Samaia	All
Double R Racing	18	(Singapore) Pavan Ravishankar	8
Double R Racing	26	(Australia) Harry Hayek	1–3
Double R Racing	26	(Sweden) Linus Lundqvist	5
Double R Racing	55	(United Kingdom) Jamie Chadwick	All
Douglas Motorsport	10	(Romania) Petru Florescu	1
Douglas Motorsport	27	(South Africa) Callan O'Keeffe	All
Douglas Motorsport	86	(United Kingdom) Jordan Cane	3–8
Lanan Racing	11	(United Kingdom) Alex Quinn	8
Lanan Racing	13	(United Kingdom) Aaron di Comberti	1–4
Lanan Racing	51	(United Kingdom) Toby Sowery	1–7
Carlin	15	(United Kingdom) James Pull	All
Carlin	28	(United States) Cameron Das	All
Carlin	65	(United Kingdom) Enaam Ahmed	All
Hillspeed with Cliff Dempsey Racing	21	(United States) Chase Owen	All
Hillspeed with Cliff Dempsey Racing	25	(Germany) Nick Worm	1–7
Fortec Motorsports	33	(Venezuela) Manuel Maldonado	All
Fortec Motorsports	63	(Denmark) Nicolai Kjærgaard	All
Fortec Motorsports	77	(United Kingdom) Ben Hingeley	All

- Jordan Cane was initially signed to drive with Hillspeed with Cliff Dempsey Racing, but later moved to Douglas Motorsport.

== Race calendar and results ==
The calendar was published on 21 September 2016. The series will support British GT at all events. It will have one oversea round at Spa-Francorchamps in Belgium.

Round		Circuit	Date	Pole position	Fastest lap	Winning driver	Winning team
1	R1	Oulton Park (International Circuit, Cheshire)	17 April	(United States) Cameron Das	(United Kingdom) Enaam Ahmed	(United Kingdom) Enaam Ahmed	Carlin
1	R2	Oulton Park (International Circuit, Cheshire)	17 April		(United Kingdom) Enaam Ahmed	(United Kingdom) Enaam Ahmed	Carlin
1	R3	Oulton Park (International Circuit, Cheshire)	17 April		(United Kingdom) Enaam Ahmed	(United Kingdom) Enaam Ahmed	Carlin
2	R4	Rockingham (National Circuit, Northamptonshire)	29 April	(United States) Cameron Das	(United States) Cameron Das	(United Kingdom) Enaam Ahmed	Carlin
2	R5	Rockingham (National Circuit, Northamptonshire)	30 April		(United States) Cameron Das	(United States) Cameron Das	Carlin
2	R6	Rockingham (National Circuit, Northamptonshire)	30 April		(United Kingdom) Ben Hingeley	(United Kingdom) Ben Hingeley	Fortec Motorsports
3	R7	Snetterton Circuit (300 Circuit, Norfolk)	27 May	(United Kingdom) James Pull	(United Kingdom) Enaam Ahmed	(United Kingdom) Enaam Ahmed	Carlin
3	R8	Snetterton Circuit (300 Circuit, Norfolk)	28 May		(United Kingdom) Enaam Ahmed	(United Kingdom) Jordan Cane	Douglas Motorsport
3	R9	Snetterton Circuit (300 Circuit, Norfolk)	28 May		(United Kingdom) Enaam Ahmed	(United Kingdom) Enaam Ahmed	Carlin
4	R10	Silverstone Circuit (Grand Prix, Northamptonshire)	10 June	(United Kingdom) Toby Sowery	(United Kingdom) Toby Sowery	(United Kingdom) Toby Sowery	Lanan Racing
4	R11	Silverstone Circuit (Grand Prix, Northamptonshire)	11 June		(United Kingdom) Toby Sowery	(United Kingdom) Ben Hingeley	Fortec Motorsports
4	R12	Silverstone Circuit (Grand Prix, Northamptonshire)	11 June		(United Kingdom) Enaam Ahmed	(United Kingdom) Toby Sowery	Lanan Racing
5	R13	Spa-Francorchamps (Belgium)	7 July	(United Kingdom) Enaam Ahmed	(United Kingdom) Toby Sowery	(United Kingdom) Ben Hingeley	Fortec Motorsports
5	R14	Spa-Francorchamps (Belgium)	8 July		(United Kingdom) Enaam Ahmed	(United Kingdom) Enaam Ahmed	Carlin
5	R15	Spa-Francorchamps (Belgium)	8 July		(United Kingdom) Enaam Ahmed	(United Kingdom) Enaam Ahmed	Carlin
6	R16	Brands Hatch (Grand Prix Circuit, Kent)	5 August	(United Kingdom) Enaam Ahmed	(United Kingdom) Toby Sowery	(United Kingdom) Enaam Ahmed	Carlin
6	R17	Brands Hatch (Grand Prix Circuit, Kent)	6 August		(United Kingdom) Enaam Ahmed	(India) Krishnaraaj Mahadik	Double R Racing
6	R18	Brands Hatch (Grand Prix Circuit, Kent)	6 August		(United Kingdom) Toby Sowery	(United Kingdom) Enaam Ahmed	Carlin
7	R19	Snetterton Circuit (300 Circuit, Norfolk)	26 August	(United Kingdom) Enaam Ahmed	(United Kingdom) Enaam Ahmed	(United Kingdom) Enaam Ahmed	Carlin
7	R20	Snetterton Circuit (300 Circuit, Norfolk)	27 August		(United Kingdom) Enaam Ahmed	(United Kingdom) Jordan Cane	Douglas Motorsport
7	R21	Snetterton Circuit (300 Circuit, Norfolk)	27 August		(United Kingdom) Toby Sowery	(United Kingdom) Enaam Ahmed	Carlin
8	R22	Donington Park (Grand Prix Circuit, Leicestershire)	23 September	(United Kingdom) Ben Hingeley	(United States) Chase Owen	(United Kingdom) Ben Hingeley	Fortec Motorsports
8	R23	Donington Park (Grand Prix Circuit, Leicestershire)	24 September		(United States) Cameron Das	(United Kingdom) Jordan Cane	Douglas Motorsport
8	R24	Donington Park (Grand Prix Circuit, Leicestershire)	24 September		(United Kingdom) Enaam Ahmed	(United Kingdom) Enaam Ahmed	Carlin

== Championship standings ==
Scoring system

Points were awarded to the top 20 classified finishers in all races.

Races	Position, points per race																			
Races	1st	2nd	3rd	4th	5th	6th	7th	8th	9th	10th	11th	12th	13th	14th	15th	16th	17th	18th	19th	20th
Races 1 & 3	35	29	24	21	19	17	15	13	12	11	10	9	8	7	6	5	4	3	2	1
Race 2	25	22	20	18	16	15	14	13	12	11	10	9	8	7	6	5	4	3	2	1

=== Drivers' championship ===
Pos.	Driver	OUL			ROC			SNE			SIL			SPA			BRH			SNE			DON			Points
1	(United Kingdom) Enaam Ahmed	1	1	1	1	8	8	1	6	1	2	5	3	2	1	1	1	3	1	1	5	1	2	6	1	575
2	(United Kingdom) James Pull	2	4	3	5	Ret	2	2	14	3	3	3	2	8	2	4	2	2	3	3	13	7	4	3	5	490
3	(United Kingdom) Ben Hingeley	4	2	6	4	4	1	5	4	7	5	1	10	1	Ret	3	Ret	Ret	5	4	3	9	1	5	4	444
4	(United Kingdom) Toby Sowery	3	Ret	7	10	6	4	3	5	2	1	2	1	4	3	2	3	DSQ	7	2	4	2				432
5	(United States) Cameron Das	5	6	2	2	1	3	6	2	6	6	7	5	7	4	5	Ret	10	2	6	15	8	3	4	13	425
6	(South Africa) Callan O'Keeffe	7	3	4	3	5	5	4	3	5	4	4	Ret	9	5	9	4	7	4	10	14	4	7	Ret	12	373
7	(United States) Chase Owen	14	8	13	11	11	7	9	9	13	Ret	9	4	10	7	6	9	6	9	13	9	6	6	2	6	302
8	(United Kingdom) Jordan Cane							8	1	4	15	15	6	5	6	Ret	5	Ret	11	7	1	3	5	1	2	288
9	(United Kingdom) Jamie Chadwick	11	DSQ	Ret	8	3	11	7	7	12	9	10	15	6	10	11	11	5	15	9	7	11	9	11	7	264
10	(Denmark) Nicolai Kjærgaard	12	5	8	7	Ret	Ret	11	8	8	7	16	7	12	12	10	7	11	6	15	10	12	8	Ret	8	247
11	(United Kingdom) Omar Ismail	8	14	5	6	2	Ret	Ret	13	9	10	12	12	11	15	13	12	4	14	11	8	14				216
12	(Venezuela) Manuel Maldonado	15	7	15	13	10	EX	12	Ret	11	8	6	13	15	14	15	10	8	13	14	11	Ret	10	7	9	205
13	(Brazil) Guilherme Samaia	13	Ret	Ret	9	12	9	14	10	Ret	14	13	8	3	Ret	12	Ret	Ret	12	8	2	10	14	8	Ret	195
14	(Kenya) Jeremy Wahome	16	11	14	16	13	6	Ret	Ret	15	11	8	9	13	11	Ret	6	DSQ	10				13	12	11	165
15	(Germany) Nick Worm	17	10	12	14	14	DNS	13	11	14	13	14	14	14	13	14	13	9	16	12	12	13				159
16	(United Kingdom) Aaron di Comberti	18	12	9	15	9	10	10	12	10	12	11	11													112
17	(India) Krishnaraaj Mahadik																8	1	8	5	6	5				104
18	(France) Tristan Charpentier	10	9	DNS										17	8	8										53
19	(Australia) Harry Hayek	6	Ret	10	12	7	Ret	DNS	DNS	DNS																51
20	(United Kingdom) Alex Quinn																						11	9	3	46
21	(Sweden) Linus Lundqvist													16	9	7										32
22	(Singapore) Pavan Ravishankar																						12	10	10	31
23	(Romania) Petru Florescu	9	Ret	11																						22
