= 2015 MSA Formula Championship =

The 2015 MSA Formula Championship was a multi-event, Formula 4 open-wheel single seater motor racing championship held across England and Scotland. The championship featured a mix of professional motor racing teams and privately funded drivers, competing in Formula 4 cars that conformed to the technical regulations for the championship. This, the inaugural season, following on from the British Formula Ford Championship, was the first year that the cars conformed to the FIA's Formula 4 regulations. Part of the TOCA tour, it formed part of the extensive program of support categories built up around the British Touring Car Championship centrepiece.

The season commenced on 5 April at Brands Hatch – on the circuit's Indy configuration – and concluded on 11 October at the same venue, utilising the Grand Prix circuit, after thirty races held at ten meetings, all in support of the 2015 British Touring Car Championship.

Lando Norris won the championship with eight victories, 42 points ahead of Ricky Collard, who won six races. Third-placed Colton Herta came out victorious four times, Sennan Fielding and second-highest placed rookie Dan Ticktum won three races each, Matheus Leist and Sandy Mitchell won twice respectively, and Josh Smith and top rookie Enaam Ahmed both triumphed just once.

== Championship changes ==
The championship adopted the technical regulations for the new FIA Formula 4 specification, becoming the official F4 championship in the United Kingdom. The championship kept the Ford EcoBoost engine but with a power reduction from 200 bhp to 160 bhp, as per the F4 regulations. The new regulations moved to a new carbon fibre monocoque chassis which met FIA F3 safety standards.

== Teams and drivers ==
All teams were British-registered.

Team	No.	Drivers	Class	Rounds
JHR Developments	3	(United Kingdom) Sennan Fielding		3–10
JHR Developments	28	(United Kingdom) Sennan Fielding		1–2
JHR Developments	96	(United Kingdom) Jack Butel		5–10
MBM Motorsport	4	(United Kingdom) Jack Barlow		1–4, 6
MBM Motorsport	26	(United Kingdom) Toby Sowery		8–10
Falcon Motorsport	7	(United Kingdom) Jessica Hawkins		4–8
Falcon Motorsport	8	(United Kingdom) Darius Karbaley	R	1–6, 9–10
Falcon Motorsport	9	(Romania) Alexandra Marinescu		1
Carlin	10	(United States) Colton Herta		All
Carlin	21	(Romania) Petru Florescu	R	All
Carlin	31	(United Kingdom) Lando Norris		All
TRS Arden Junior Racing Team	11	(United Kingdom) Ricky Collard		All
TRS Arden Junior Racing Team	19	(United Kingdom) Sandy Mitchell	R	All
TRS Arden Junior Racing Team	65	(United Kingdom) Enaam Ahmed	R	All
Joe Tandy Racing	14	(United Kingdom) Daniel Baybutt	R	All
Joe Tandy Racing	15	(United Kingdom) James Pull		1–6
Joe Tandy Racing	51	(India) Ameya Vaidyanathan	R	2–6, 8, 10
Double R Racing	17	(Brazil) Gustavo Myasava		1–2
Double R Racing	18	(Brazil) Matheus Leist		All
Double R Racing	22	(India) Tarun Reddy		All
Richardson Racing	23	(United Kingdom) Ollie Pidgley		2–7
Richardson Racing	25	(United Kingdom) Louise Richardson		All
Richardson Racing	88	(Australia) Greg Holloway		8–10
Fortec Motorsports	15	(United Kingdom) James Pull		7–10
Fortec Motorsports	26	(United Kingdom) Toby Sowery		4, 6
Fortec Motorsports	27	(United Kingdom) Dan Ticktum	R	1–9
Fortec Motorsports	59	(United Kingdom) Josh Smith	R	All
SWB Motorsport	46	(Brazil) Rafael Martins	R	All
SWB Motorsport	71	(United Kingdom) Jodie Hemming		9
SWB Motorsport	96	(United Kingdom) Jack Butel		1–4

Icon	Class
R	Rookie

== Race calendar and results ==
The calendar for the 2015 TOCA package was announced on 14 September 2014. The Oulton Park round reverted to the Island layout, after using the International circuit in 2014. All races were held in the United Kingdom.

Round		Circuit	Date	Pole position	Fastest lap	Winning driver	Winning team	Rookie winner
1	R1	Brands Hatch (Indy Circuit, Kent)	4 April	(United Kingdom) Daniel Baybutt	(United Kingdom) Dan Ticktum	(United Kingdom) Lando Norris	Carlin	(United Kingdom) Dan Ticktum
1	R2	Brands Hatch (Indy Circuit, Kent)	5 April		(United Kingdom) Dan Ticktum	(United Kingdom) Ricky Collard	TRS Arden Junior Racing Team	(United Kingdom) Dan Ticktum
1	R3	Brands Hatch (Indy Circuit, Kent)	5 April	(United Kingdom) Lando Norris	(United Kingdom) Lando Norris	(United Kingdom) Lando Norris	Carlin	(United Kingdom) Dan Ticktum
2	R4	Donington Park (National Circuit, Leicestershire)	18 April	(United Kingdom) Dan Ticktum	(United Kingdom) James Pull	(United Kingdom) Dan Ticktum	Fortec Motorsports	(United Kingdom) Dan Ticktum
2	R5	Donington Park (National Circuit, Leicestershire)	19 April		(United Kingdom) Jack Barlow	(Brazil) Matheus Leist	Double R Racing	(United Kingdom) Dan Ticktum
2	R6	Donington Park (National Circuit, Leicestershire)	19 April	(United Kingdom) Dan Ticktum	(United Kingdom) Dan Ticktum	(United Kingdom) Dan Ticktum	Fortec Motorsports	(United Kingdom) Dan Ticktum
3	R7	Thruxton Circuit (Hampshire)	9 May	(United Kingdom) Sandy Mitchell	(United Kingdom) Sandy Mitchell	(United Kingdom) Sandy Mitchell	TRS Arden Junior Racing Team	(United Kingdom) Sandy Mitchell
3	R8	Thruxton Circuit (Hampshire)	10 May		(United Kingdom) Sandy Mitchell	(United Kingdom) Lando Norris	Carlin	(United Kingdom) Sandy Mitchell
3	R9	Thruxton Circuit (Hampshire)	10 May	(United Kingdom) Sandy Mitchell	(United Kingdom) Ricky Collard	(United Kingdom) Sandy Mitchell	TRS Arden Junior Racing Team	(United Kingdom) Sandy Mitchell
4	R10	Oulton Park (Island Circuit, Cheshire)	6 June	(United Kingdom) Lando Norris	(United States) Colton Herta	(United Kingdom) Ricky Collard	TRS Arden Junior Racing Team	(Brazil) Rafael Martins
4	R11	Oulton Park (Island Circuit, Cheshire)	6 June		(Brazil) Matheus Leist	(United Kingdom) Sennan Fielding	JHR Developments	(United Kingdom) Dan Ticktum
4	R12	Oulton Park (Island Circuit, Cheshire)	7 June	(United Kingdom) Lando Norris	(United Kingdom) Lando Norris	(United Kingdom) Lando Norris	Carlin	(United Kingdom) Dan Ticktum
5	R13	Croft Circuit (North Yorkshire)	27 June	(United Kingdom) Lando Norris	(United Kingdom) Lando Norris	(United Kingdom) Sennan Fielding	JHR Developments	(United Kingdom) Josh Smith
5	R14	Croft Circuit (North Yorkshire)	27 June		(United States) Colton Herta	(United Kingdom) Josh Smith	Fortec Motorsports	(United Kingdom) Josh Smith
5	R15	Croft Circuit (North Yorkshire)	28 June	(United Kingdom) Lando Norris	(United Kingdom) Lando Norris	(United Kingdom) Ricky Collard	TRS Arden Junior Racing Team	(Romania) Petru Florescu
6	R16	Snetterton Circuit (300 Circuit, Norfolk)	8 August	(United States) Colton Herta	(United States) Colton Herta	(United Kingdom) Dan Ticktum	Fortec Motorsports	(United Kingdom) Dan Ticktum
6	R17	Snetterton Circuit (300 Circuit, Norfolk)	9 August		(United Kingdom) Dan Ticktum	(United States) Colton Herta	Carlin	(United Kingdom) Dan Ticktum
6	R18	Snetterton Circuit (300 Circuit, Norfolk)	9 August	(United States) Colton Herta	(United States) Colton Herta	(United States) Colton Herta	Carlin	(United Kingdom) Dan Ticktum
7	R19	Knockhill Racing Circuit (Fife)	22 August	(United Kingdom) Lando Norris	(United Kingdom) Lando Norris	(United Kingdom) Lando Norris	Carlin	(United Kingdom) Enaam Ahmed
7	R20	Knockhill Racing Circuit (Fife)	23 August		(United Kingdom) Dan Ticktum	(United Kingdom) Sennan Fielding	JHR Developments	(United Kingdom) Josh Smith
7	R21	Knockhill Racing Circuit (Fife)	23 August	(United Kingdom) Dan Ticktum	(United States) Colton Herta	(United Kingdom) Ricky Collard	TRS Arden Junior Racing Team	(United Kingdom) Enaam Ahmed
8	R22	Rockingham Motor Speedway (International Super Sports Car Circuit, Northamptonshire)	5 September	(United Kingdom) Lando Norris	(United Kingdom) Lando Norris	(United Kingdom) Lando Norris	Carlin	(United Kingdom) Dan Ticktum
8	R23	Rockingham Motor Speedway (International Super Sports Car Circuit, Northamptonshire)	6 September		(United Kingdom) Sennan Fielding	(United Kingdom) Ricky Collard	TRS Arden Junior Racing Team	(United Kingdom) Sandy Mitchell
8	R24	Rockingham Motor Speedway (International Super Sports Car Circuit, Northamptonshire)	6 September	(United States) Colton Herta	(United Kingdom) Lando Norris	(United States) Colton Herta	Carlin	(United Kingdom) Dan Ticktum
9	R25	Silverstone Circuit (National Circuit, Northamptonshire)	26 September	(Brazil) Matheus Leist	(United States) Colton Herta	(United Kingdom) Lando Norris	Carlin	(United Kingdom) Daniel Baybutt
9	R26	Silverstone Circuit (National Circuit, Northamptonshire)	27 September		(United Kingdom) Ricky Collard	(United Kingdom) Ricky Collard	TRS Arden Junior Racing Team	(United Kingdom) Daniel Baybutt
9	R27	Silverstone Circuit (National Circuit, Northamptonshire)	27 September	(United Kingdom) Lando Norris	(United States) Colton Herta	(Brazil) Matheus Leist	Double R Racing	(United Kingdom) Enaam Ahmed
10	R28	Brands Hatch (Grand Prix Circuit, Kent)	10 October	(United Kingdom) Lando Norris	(United Kingdom) Lando Norris	(United Kingdom) Lando Norris	Carlin	(United Kingdom) Enaam Ahmed
10	R29	Brands Hatch (Grand Prix Circuit, Kent)	10 October		(United Kingdom) Lando Norris	(United Kingdom) Enaam Ahmed	TRS Arden Junior Racing Team	(United Kingdom) Enaam Ahmed
10	R30	Brands Hatch (Grand Prix Circuit, Kent)	11 October	(United Kingdom) Lando Norris	(United States) Colton Herta	(United States) Colton Herta	Carlin	(United Kingdom) Enaam Ahmed

== Championship standings ==
Points were awarded as follows:

Position	**1st**	**2nd**	**3rd**	**4th**	**5th**	**6th**	**7th**	**8th**	**9th**	**10th+**	R1 PP	FL
Points	25	18	15	12	10	8	6	4	2	1	5	1

=== Drivers' championship ===
Pos	Driver	BHI			DON			THR			OUL			CRO			SNE			KNO			ROC			SIL			BHGP			Points
Pos	Driver	R1	R2	R3	R1	R2	R3	R1	R2	R3	R1	R2	R3	R1	R2	R3	R1	R2	R3	R1	R2	R3	R1	R2	R3	R1	R2	R3	R1	R2	R3	Points
1	(United Kingdom) Lando Norris	1	9	**1**	4	6	10	10	1	3	**2**	8	**1**	**Ret**	12	**2**	2	8	2	**1**	Ret	7	**1**	8	2	1	7	**10**	**1**	7	**2**	413
2	(United Kingdom) Ricky Collard	5	1	6	6	2	2	4	4	2	1	9	2	2	11	1	3	6	9	Ret	7	1	8	1	8	5	1	Ret	3	6	8	371
3	(United States) Colton Herta	12	4	14	15	9	4	5	6	9	3	6	Ret	6	2	14	**9**	1	**1**	5	2	2	3	7	**1**	2	5	2	2	5	1	355
4	(United Kingdom) Sennan Fielding	4	Ret	10	5	3	Ret	Ret	10	8	8	1	3	1	4	3	4	3	4	3	1	3	6	2	Ret	6	2	Ret	Ret	8	5	300
5	(Brazil) Matheus Leist	3	8	3	7	1	Ret	2	5	4	5	2	DSQ	5	5	6	7	Ret	DNS	9	6	11	5	4	6	**4**	3	1	Ret	14	7	273
6	(United Kingdom) Dan Ticktum	2	2	5	**1**	5	**1**	7	Ret	Ret	9	3	4	DSQ	DSQ	DSQ	1	2	3	8	Ret	**8**	2	5	3	DSQ	DSQ	DSQ				242
7	(United Kingdom) Sandy Mitchell	14	6	12	13	Ret	Ret	**1**	2	**1**	13	11	12	8	7	7	15	Ret	20	4	4	5	9	3	15	8	9	Ret	6	2	9	193
8	(United Kingdom) Enaam Ahmed	9	Ret	7	11	19	8	8	7	10	15	20	11	9	8	11	6	7	7	2	5	4	4	6	13	11	11	3	4	1	3	176
9	(Brazil) Rafael Martins	6	Ret	9	Ret	15	Ret	6	3	7	4	7	14	14	15	10	13	12	10	Ret	8	6	12	Ret	18	10	6	Ret	5	3	10	114
10	(United Kingdom) James Pull	8	3	2	2	7	3	Ret	11	Ret	Ret	13	8	11	10	12	18	16	13	6	Ret	Ret	16	14	7	9	17	Ret	10	9	6	104
11	(Romania) Petru Florescu	13	10	11	10	18	15	Ret	14	5	7	15	5	Ret	13	4	5	11	5	14	11	Ret	7	11	5	13	10	7	9	11	12	99
12	(United Kingdom) Daniel Baybutt	**7**	14	8	9	10	7	3	19	Ret	10	4	9	10	9	9	21	13	12	11	Ret	Ret	17	13	11	7	4	8	7	10	11	98
13	(United Kingdom) Josh Smith	11	5	15	Ret	13	9	15	16	13	12	Ret	10	7	1	Ret	20	10	19	7	3	10	13	15	10	16	15	Ret	14	12	19	84
14	(United Kingdom) Toby Sowery										Ret	14	6				11	4	Ret				Ret	9	4	3	12	Ret	8	4	4	80
15	(India) Tarun Reddy	10	Ret	Ret	Ret	16	6	Ret	8	6	11	10	7	3	6	8	8	5	6	10	Ret	Ret	10	NC	Ret	Ret	14	Ret	Ret	Ret	14	77
16	(United Kingdom) Louise Richardson	Ret	12	Ret	12	11	16	12	12	12	14	17	13	4	3	5	12	14	14	15	12	9	14	Ret	9	14	16	5	11	13	17	72
17	(United Kingdom) Jack Barlow	Ret	7	4	8	4	5	11	15	11	6	5	Ret				10	18	8													72
18	(United Kingdom) Jack Butel	15	11	Ret	14	12	13	13	13	Ret	18	18	16	Ret	16	16	17	9	16	16	9	13	Ret	12	14	12	8	6	12	17	14	38
19	(United Kingdom) Darius Karbaley	16	13	13	Ret	Ret	12	9	9	14	16	12	18	Ret	DNS	Ret	16	15	17							15	13	4	Ret	15	16	31
20	(Brazil) Gustavo Myasava	Ret	Ret	Ret	3	8	Ret																									19
21	(United Kingdom) Ollie Pidgley				16	17	14	14	18	16	17	16	17	13	17	15	Ret	19	15	13	10	12										17
22	(India) Ameya Vaidyanathan				17	14	11	Ret	17	15	20	DNS	Ret	12	Ret	17	19	Ret	18				15	10	16				Ret	16	15	15
23	(United Kingdom) Jessica Hawkins										19	19	15	15	14	13	14	17	11	12	Ret	14	11	Ret	12							13
24	(Australia) Greg Holloway																						18	16	17	17	18	9	13	18	18	10
–	(Romania) Alexandra Marinescu	DNS	DNS	DNS																												0
–	(United Kingdom) Jodie Hemming																									DNS	DNS	DNS				0
Pos	Driver	R1	R2	R3	R1	R2	R3	R1	R2	R3	R1	R2	R3	R1	R2	R3	R1	R2	R3	R1	R2	R3	R1	R2	R3	R1	R2	R3	R1	R2	R3	Points
Pos	Driver	BHI			DON			THR			OUL			CRO			SNE			KNO			ROC			SIL			BHGP			Points

Colour	Result
Gold	Winner
Silver	Second place
Bronze	Third place
Green	Points classification
Blue	Non-points classification
Blue	Non-classified finish (NC)
Purple	Retired, not classified (Ret)
Red	Did not qualify (DNQ)
Red	Did not pre-qualify (DNPQ)
Black	Disqualified (DSQ)
White	Did not start (DNS)
White	Withdrew (WD)
White	Race cancelled (C)
Blank	Did not practice (DNP)
Blank	Did not arrive (DNA)
Blank	Excluded (EX)

**Bold** – Pole
Italics – Fastest Lap
† — Did not finish, but classified

=== Rookie Cup ===
Pos	Driver	BHI			DON			THR			OUL			CRO			SNE			KNO			ROC			SIL			BHGP			Points
Pos	Driver	R1	R2	R3	R1	R2	R3	R1	R2	R3	R1	R2	R3	R1	R2	R3	R1	R2	R3	R1	R2	R3	R1	R2	R3	R1	R2	R3	R1	R2	R3	Points
1	(United Kingdom) Enaam Ahmed	9	Ret	7	11	19	8	8	7	10	15	20	11	9	8	11	6	7	7	2	5	4	4	6	13	11	11	3	**4**	1	**3**	440
2	(United Kingdom) Dan Ticktum	2	2	5	**1**	5	**1**	7	Ret	Ret	9	3	4	DSQ	DSQ	DSQ	**1**	2	**3**	**8**	Ret	**8**	**2**	5	**3**	DSQ	DSQ	DSQ				408
3	(United Kingdom) Sandy Mitchell	14	6	12	13	Ret	Ret	**1**	2	**1**	13	11	12	8	7	7	15	Ret	20	4	4	5	9	3	15	8	9	Ret	6	2	9	401
4	(United Kingdom) Daniel Baybutt	**7**	14	**8**	9	10	7	3	19	Ret	10	4	9	10	9	9	21	13	12	11	Ret	Ret	17	13	11	**7**	4	**8**	7	10	11	363
5	(Romania) Petru Florescu	13	10	11	10	18	15	Ret	14	5	7	15	5	**Ret**	13	**4**	5	11	5	14	11	Ret	7	11	5	13	10	7	9	11	12	350
6	(Brazil) Rafael Martins	6	Ret	9	Ret	15	Ret	6	3	7	**4**	7	**14**	14	15	10	13	12	10	Ret	8	6	12	Ret	18	10	6	Ret	5	3	10	325
7	(United Kingdom) Josh Smith	11	5	15	Ret	13	9	15	16	13	12	Ret	10	7	1	Ret	20	10	19	7	3	10	13	15	10	16	15	Ret	14	12	19	290
8	(United Kingdom) Darius Karbaley	16	13	13	Ret	Ret	12	9	9	14	16	12	18	Ret	DNS	Ret	16	15	17							15	13	4	Ret	15	16	142
9	(India) Ameya Vaidyanathan				17	14	11	Ret	17	15	20	DNS	Ret	12	Ret	17	19	Ret	18				15	10	16				Ret	16	15	110
Pos	Driver	R1	R2	R3	R1	R2	R3	R1	R2	R3	R1	R2	R3	R1	R2	R3	R1	R2	R3	R1	R2	R3	R1	R2	R3	R1	R2	R3	R1	R2	R3	Points
Pos	Driver	BHI			DON			THR			OUL			CRO			SNE			KNO			ROC			SIL			BHGP			Points

=== Nations Cup ===
Pos	Driver	BHI			DON			THR			OUL			CRO			SNE			KNO			ROC			SIL			BHGP			Points
Pos	Driver	R1	R2	R3	R1	R2	R3	R1	R2	R3	R1	R2	R3	R1	R2	R3	R1	R2	R3	R1	R2	R3	R1	R2	R3	R1	R2	R3	R1	R2	R3	Points
1	United States	12	4	14	15	9	4	5	6	9	3	6	Ret	6	2	14	9	1	1	5	2	2	3	7	1	2	5	2	2	5	1	590
2	Brazil	3	8	3	3	1	Ret	2	3	4	4	2	14	5	5	6	7	12	10	9	6	6	5	4	6	4	3	1	5	3	7	588
3	Romania	13	10	11	10	18	15	Ret	14	5	7	15	5	Ret	13	4	5	11	5	14	11	Ret	7	11	5	13	10	7	9	11	12	432
4	India	10	Ret	Ret	17	14	6	Ret	8	6	11	10	7	3	6	8	8	5	6	10	Ret	Ret	10	10	16	Ret	14	Ret	Ret	16	14	292
Pos	Driver	R1	R2	R3	R1	R2	R3	R1	R2	R3	R1	R2	R3	R1	R2	R3	R1	R2	R3	R1	R2	R3	R1	R2	R3	R1	R2	R3	R1	R2	R3	Points
Pos	Driver	BHI			DON			THR			OUL			CRO			SNE			KNO			ROC			SIL			BHGP			Points

=== Teams Cup ===
Pos	Team	Pts
1	Carlin	712
2	TRS Arden Junior Racing Team	627
3	Double R Racing	374
4	Fortec Motorsports	360
5	JHR Developments	345
6	JTR	205
7	MBM Motorsport	144
8	SWB Motorsport	122
9	Richardson Racing	85
10	Falcon Motorsport	34
