= 2016 F4 British Championship =

The 2016 F4 British Championship (known as 2016 MSA Formula Championship at the first two rounds) was a multi-event, Formula 4 open-wheel single seater motor racing championship held across England and Scotland. The championship featured a mix of professional motor racing teams and privately funded drivers, competing in Formula 4 cars that conformed to the technical regulations for the championship. This, the second season, following on from the British Formula Ford Championship, was the second year that the cars conformed to the FIA's Formula 4 regulations. Part of the TOCA tour, it formed part of the extensive program of support categories built up around the BTCC centrepiece.

The season commenced on 2 April at Brands Hatch – on the circuit's Indy configuration – and concluded on 1 October at the same venue, utilising the Grand Prix circuit, after thirty races at ten meetings, all in support of the 2016 British Touring Car Championship season.

== Teams and drivers ==
All teams were British-registered.

Team	No.	Drivers	Class	Rounds
Carlin	1	(Canada) Devlin DeFrancesco		All
Carlin	10	(Romania) Petru Florescu		All
Carlin	15	(United Kingdom) James Pull		All
Carlin	31	(United Kingdom) Max Fewtrell		All
Richardson Racing	2	(United Kingdom) Andrew Richardson		9–10
Richardson Racing	25	(Romania) Alexandra Marinescu		6, 8
JHR Developments	3	(United Kingdom) Sennan Fielding		All
JHR Developments	23	(United Kingdom) Billy Monger		1–4, 6–10
JHR Developments	96	(United Kingdom) Jack Butel		1–6, 8–10
Fortec Motorsports	5	(United Kingdom) Frank Bird		All
Fortec Motorsports	7	(United Kingdom) Alex Quinn	R	All
Fortec Motorsports	33	(United Kingdom) Ross Martin	R	1–3
Fortec Motorsports	38	(United Kingdom) Jamie Caroline		5–10
Fortec Motorsports	63	(Denmark) Nicolai Kjærgaard	R	All
Double R Racing	8	(Germany) Carrie Schreiner		1, 3, 8–9
Double R Racing	93	(Australia) Zane Goddard		All
TRS Arden Junior Racing Team	12	(United Kingdom) Ayrton Simmons	R	3–10
TRS Arden Junior Racing Team	21	(Brazil) Rafael Martins		All
TRS Arden Junior Racing Team	26	(Australia) Luis Leeds		All
TRS Arden Junior Racing Team	88	(United Kingdom) Jack Martin	R	All
Falcon Motorsport	20	(Mexico) Alexandra Mohnhaupt		6–7
Jamun Racing	35	(Australia) Harry Hayek		1–3
Jamun Racing	38	(United Kingdom) Jamie Caroline		1–4
Joe Tandy Racing	44	(Denmark) Patrik Matthiesen		1–6, 8–9

Icon	Class
R	Rookie

== Race calendar and results ==
The calendar for the 2016 TOCA package was announced on 27 July 2015.

Round		Circuit	Date	Pole position	Fastest lap	Winning driver	Winning team	Rookie winner
1	R1	Brands Hatch (Indy Circuit, Kent)	2 April	(Romania) Petru Florescu	(Romania) Petru Florescu	(Romania) Petru Florescu	Carlin	(United Kingdom) Alex Quinn
1	R2	Brands Hatch (Indy Circuit, Kent)	2 April		(United Kingdom) Sennan Fielding	(United Kingdom) Sennan Fielding	JHR Developments	(United Kingdom) Alex Quinn
1	R3	Brands Hatch (Indy Circuit, Kent)	3 April	(Romania) Petru Florescu	(Australia) Luis Leeds	(Romania) Petru Florescu	Carlin	(United Kingdom) Alex Quinn
2	R4	Donington Park (National Circuit, Leicestershire)	16 April	(United Kingdom) Alex Quinn	(United Kingdom) James Pull	(United Kingdom) Alex Quinn	Fortec Motorsport	(United Kingdom) Alex Quinn
2	R5	Donington Park (National Circuit, Leicestershire)	17 April		(Romania) Petru Florescu	(United Kingdom) Sennan Fielding	JHR Developments	(United Kingdom) Jack Martin
2	R6	Donington Park (National Circuit, Leicestershire)	17 April	(United Kingdom) Max Fewtrell	(United Kingdom) Alex Quinn	(United Kingdom) Max Fewtrell	Carlin	(United Kingdom) Ross Martin
3	R7	Thruxton Circuit (Hampshire)	7 May	(Romania) Petru Florescu	(Romania) Petru Florescu	(Romania) Petru Florescu	Carlin	(United Kingdom) Alex Quinn
3	R8	Thruxton Circuit (Hampshire)	8 May		(United Kingdom) Sennan Fielding	(Australia) Luis Leeds	TRS Arden Junior Racing Team	(United Kingdom) Ayrton Simmons
3	R9	Thruxton Circuit (Hampshire)	8 May	(Romania) Petru Florescu	(Canada) Devlin DeFrancesco	(Canada) Devlin DeFrancesco	Carlin	(United Kingdom) Alex Quinn
4	R10	Oulton Park (Island Circuit, Cheshire)	4 June	(Canada) Devlin DeFrancesco	(United Kingdom) Jamie Caroline	(Canada) Devlin DeFrancesco	Carlin	(United Kingdom) Alex Quinn
4	R11	Oulton Park (Island Circuit, Cheshire)	5 June		(United Kingdom) Sennan Fielding	(Brazil) Rafael Martins	TRS Arden Junior Racing Team	(United Kingdom) Alex Quinn
4	R12	Oulton Park (Island Circuit, Cheshire)	5 June	(Romania) Petru Florescu	(Romania) Petru Florescu	(Romania) Petru Florescu	Carlin	(Denmark) Nicolai Kjærgaard
5	R13	Croft Circuit (North Yorkshire)	18 June	(Australia) Zane Goddard	(Australia) Zane Goddard	(Australia) Zane Goddard	Double R Racing	(United Kingdom) Jack Martin
5	R14	Croft Circuit (North Yorkshire)	19 June		(Australia) Zane Goddard	(Australia) Luis Leeds	TRS Arden Junior Racing Team	(United Kingdom) Jack Martin
5	R15	Croft Circuit (North Yorkshire)	19 June	(Australia) Zane Goddard	(Australia) Zane Goddard	(Canada) Devlin DeFrancesco	Carlin	(United Kingdom) Alex Quinn
6	R16	Snetterton Motor Racing Circuit (300 Circuit, Norfolk)	30 July	(United Kingdom) Sennan Fielding	(United Kingdom) James Pull	(United Kingdom) Sennan Fielding	JHR Developments	(Denmark) Nicolai Kjærgaard
6	R17	Snetterton Motor Racing Circuit (300 Circuit, Norfolk)	30 July		(Romania) Petru Florescu	(Romania) Petru Florescu	Carlin	(Denmark) Nicolai Kjærgaard
6	R18	Snetterton Motor Racing Circuit (300 Circuit, Norfolk)	31 July	(United Kingdom) Sennan Fielding	(Romania) Petru Florescu	(United Kingdom) Sennan Fielding	JHR Developments	(Denmark) Nicolai Kjærgaard
7	R19	Knockhill Racing Circuit (Fife)	13 August	(Romania) Petru Florescu	(Canada) Devlin DeFrancesco	(United Kingdom) Alex Quinn (Note: Petru Florescu initially won the race, but was later disqualified following an incident with Devlin DeFrancesco in the following race.)	Fortec Motorsport	(United Kingdom) Alex Quinn
7	R20	Knockhill Racing Circuit (Fife)	14 August		(Australia) Luis Leeds	(Australia) Luis Leeds	TRS Arden Junior Racing Team	(United Kingdom) Alex Quinn
7	R21	Knockhill Racing Circuit (Fife)	14 August	(United Kingdom) Alex Quinn	(Australia) Zane Goddard	(Australia) Zane Goddard	Double R Racing	(United Kingdom) Alex Quinn
8	R22	Rockingham Motor Speedway (International Super Sports Car Circuit, Northamptonshire)	27 August	(United Kingdom) James Pull	(United Kingdom) James Pull	(United Kingdom) James Pull	Carlin	(United Kingdom) Alex Quinn
8	R23	Rockingham Motor Speedway (International Super Sports Car Circuit, Northamptonshire)	28 August		(Australia) Luis Leeds	(United Kingdom) Sennan Fielding	JHR Developments	(United Kingdom) Alex Quinn
8	R24	Rockingham Motor Speedway (International Super Sports Car Circuit, Northamptonshire)	28 August	(United Kingdom) Billy Monger	(United Kingdom) James Pull	(United Kingdom) Max Fewtrell	Carlin	(United Kingdom) Alex Quinn
9	R25	Silverstone Circuit (National Circuit, Northamptonshire)	17 September	(United Kingdom) Sennan Fielding	(United Kingdom) Max Fewtrell	(Australia) Zane Goddard	Double R Racing	(United Kingdom) Ayrton Simmons
9	R26	Silverstone Circuit (National Circuit, Northamptonshire)	18 September		(United Kingdom) Max Fewtrell	(United Kingdom) Alex Quinn	Fortec Motorsport	(United Kingdom) Alex Quinn
9	R27	Silverstone Circuit (National Circuit, Northamptonshire)	18 September	(Australia) Luis Leeds	(United Kingdom) Max Fewtrell	(Australia) Zane Goddard	Double R Racing	(United Kingdom) Ayrton Simmons
10	R28	Brands Hatch (Grand Prix Circuit, Kent)	1 October	(United Kingdom) Max Fewtrell (Note: Jamie Caroline achieved double pole for Brands Hatch, but was later excluded.)	(United Kingdom) Jamie Caroline	(United Kingdom) James Pull	Carlin	(United Kingdom) Ayrton Simmons
10	R29	Brands Hatch (Grand Prix Circuit, Kent)	2 October		(United Kingdom) Billy Monger	(United Kingdom) Jamie Caroline	Fortec Motorsport	(United Kingdom) Ayrton Simmons
10	R30	Brands Hatch (Grand Prix Circuit, Kent)	2 October	(United Kingdom) Max Fewtrell	(United Kingdom) Sennan Fielding	(United Kingdom) Max Fewtrell	Carlin	(United Kingdom) Ayrton Simmons

== Championship standings ==
Points were awarded as follows:

Position	**1st**	**2nd**	**3rd**	**4th**	**5th**	**6th**	**7th**	**8th**	**9th**	**10th**
Points	25	18	15	12	10	8	6	4	2	1

=== Drivers' standings ===
Pos	Driver	BHI			DON			THR			OUL			CRO			SNE			KNO			ROC			SIL			BHGP			Pts
1	(United Kingdom) Max Fewtrell	2	6	6	3	3	**1**	Ret	Ret	3	5	5	4	2	3	3	Ret	9	3	8	3	5	3	3	1	11	7	5	**3**	3	**1**	358
2	(United Kingdom) Sennan Fielding	5	1	14	7	1	5	3	6	5	10	9	8	Ret	6	5	**1**	5	**1**	Ret	8	4	5	1	2	**2**	4	3	2	5	3	351
3	(Australia) Luis Leeds	4	9	2	2	Ret	2	5	1	8	13	8	11	3	1	10	5	17	4	5	1	2	7	2	10	8	3	**2**	10	11	5	300
4	(United Kingdom) James Pull	3	3	3	4	Ret	4	6	7	4	6	2	5	8	5	6	3	2	Ret	7	5	7	**1**	DSQ	9	4	12	6	1	7	4	291
5	(Canada) Devlin DeFrancesco	10	Ret	7	5	Ret	17	2	Ret	1	**1**	7	2	4	Ret	1	2	3	2	2	Ret	9	Ret	9	7	3	5	4	Ret	16	7	265
6	(Romania) Petru Florescu	**1**	Ret	**1**	6	2	13	**1**	13	**9**	2	4	**1**	Ret	8	9	7	1	5	**DSQ**	Ret	EX	Ret	7	4	5	Ret	17	6	2	8	260
7	(United Kingdom) Alex Quinn	8	7	5	**1**	9	6	4	12	7	4	3	Ret	Ret	Ret	4	9	6	15	1	4	**3**	2	5	5	9	1	10	8	8	11	248
8	(Australia) Zane Goddard	9	4	8	Ret	Ret	Ret	Ret	5	6	8	Ret	10	**1**	2	**2**	4	14	7	3	2	1	9	10	12	1	6	1	13	10	6	239
9	(Brazil) Rafael Martins	7	5	4	10	4	8	Ret	Ret	Ret	7	1	6	6	4	7	8	Ret	11	Ret	7	6	6	8	6	6	2	7	4	4	10	205
10	(United Kingdom) Jamie Caroline	6	2	12	8	5	7	10	2	Ret	3	Ret	3	5	Ret	8	Ret	7	Ret	4	13	8	4	4	14	12	9	14	7	1	9	181
11	(United Kingdom) Ayrton Simmons							12	8	17	16	12	9	11	9	14	11	16	8	10	6	12	11	6	8	7	8	9	5	6	2	82
12	(United Kingdom) Billy Monger	11	8	18	9	6	11	Ret	3	2	9	6	13				Ret	11	12	Ret	9	13	15	13	**3**	Ret	11	8	Ret	12	Ret	78
13	(Denmark) Nicolai Kjærgaard	13	10	16	14	Ret	14	Ret	Ret	14	14	15	7	EX	10	11	6	4	6	6	11	10	8	11	18	10	Ret	14	11	9	12	50
14	(United Kingdom) Jack Martin	16	16	13	13	8	9	Ret	EX	13	11	10	12	7	7	12	12	Ret	9	9	Ret	11	12	Ret	13	14	15	12	14	13	13	25
15	(United Kingdom) Ross Martin	Ret	12	9	12	Ret	3	9	9	11																						21
16	(Denmark) Patrik Matthiesen	17	14	19	16	10	15	8	10	10	12	11	Ret	9	11	13	10	8	10				13	Ret	11	16	14	18				15
17	(Germany) Carrie Schreiner	15	15	15				13	4	16													10	Ret	15	13	10	16				14
18	(United Kingdom) Jack Butel	12	13	11	Ret	7	12	7	Ret	18	17	13	14	Ret	12	16	14	13	13				17	12	16	17	13	11	9	14	14	14
19	(United Kingdom) Frank Bird	18	Ret	17	15	11	16	14	Ret	15	15	14	Ret	10	Ret	15	13	10	14	12	10	14	14	NC	17	15	16	13	12	Ret	16	3
20	(Australia) Harry Hayek	14	11	10	11	12	10	11	11	12																						2
21	(Mexico) Alexandra Mohnhaupt																16	15	17	11	12	15										0
22	(Romania) Alexandra Marinescu																15	12	16				16	14	19							0
23	(United Kingdom) Andrew Richardson																									18	17	19	15	15	15	0
Pos	Driver	BHI			DON			THR			OUL			CRO			SNE			KNO			ROC			SIL			BHGP			Pts

Colour	Result
Gold	Winner
Silver	Second place
Bronze	Third place
Green	Points classification
Blue	Non-points classification
Blue	Non-classified finish (NC)
Purple	Retired, not classified (Ret)
Red	Did not qualify (DNQ)
Red	Did not pre-qualify (DNPQ)
Black	Disqualified (DSQ)
White	Did not start (DNS)
White	Withdrew (WD)
White	Race cancelled (C)
Blank	Did not practice (DNP)
Blank	Did not arrive (DNA)
Blank	Excluded (EX)

**Bold** – Pole
Italics – Fastest Lap

=== Rookie Cup ===
Pos	Driver	BHI			DON			THR			OUL			CRO			SNE			KNO			ROC			SIL			BHGP			Points
1	(United Kingdom) Alex Quinn	8	7	5	1	9	6	4	12	7	4	3	Ret	Ret	Ret	4	9	6	15	1	4	3	2	5	5	9	1	10	8	8	11	589
2	(United Kingdom) Ayrton Simmons							12	8	17	16	12	9	11	9	14	11	16	8	9	6	12	11	6	8	7	8	9	5	6	2	430
3	(Denmark) Nicolai Kjaergaard	13	10	16	14	Ret	14	Ret	Ret	14	14	15	1	Ret	10	11	6	5	6	10	11	10	8	11	18	10	Ret	15	11	9	12	400
4	(United Kingdom) Jack Martin	16	16	13	13	8	9	Ret	EX	13	11	10	12	7	7	12	12	Ret	9	8	Ret	11	12	Ret	13	14	15	12	14	13	13	393
5	(United Kingdom) Ross Martin	Ret	12	9	12	Ret	3	9	9	11																						130
Pos	Driver	BHI			DON			THR			OUL			CRO			SNE			KNO			ROC			SIL			BHGP			Points

=== Teams Cup ===
Pos	Team	Pts
1	Carlin	618
2	TRS Arden Junior Racing Team	505
3	JHR Developments	429
4	Fortec Motorsports	355
5	Double R Racing	253
6	Jamun Racing	97
6	JTR	15
8	Richardson Racing	0
9	Falcon Motorsport	0
