= Alex Quinn =

British racing driver (born 2000)

- Quinn at Silverstone Circuit in 2026
- Nationality: (United Kingdom) British
- Born: Alexander James Quinn; 29 December 2000 (age 25) Truro, United Kingdom

FIA World Endurance Championship career
- Debut season: 2026
- Current team: Peugeot
- Categorisation: FIA Silver (until 2023); FIA Gold (2024–)
- Car number: 93
- Starts: 0
- Wins: 0
- Podiums: 0
- Poles: 0
- Fastest laps: 0
- Best finish: TBD in 2026

Previous series
- 2024–2026 2024–2026 2023–2026 2022 2021 2019–20 2018 2017 2016–17: Asian Le Mans Series; European Le Mans Series; IMSA SportsCar Championship; USF2000 National Championship; FR European Championship; Formula Renault Eurocup; British GT Championship; BRDC British F3 Championship; F4 British Championship

Championship titles
- 2026: IMSA SportsCar Championship - LMP2

Alexander James Quinn (born 29 December 2000) is a British racing driver competing in the FIA World Endurance Championship for Peugeot. He graduated to Hypercar in late 2026, after four seasons in LMP2 and an IMSA title for CrowdStrike by APR.

== Early career ==
=== Karting ===
Born in Truro and based near Camelford, Quinn started his karting career in 2011. He competed in multiple championships such as the Super 1 National Rotax Mini Max Championship and won multiple national karting championships.

=== Lower formulae ===
In 2016, Quinn made his car racing debut in the F4 British Championship, driving for Fortec Motorsport. He won three races and was crowned as the winner of the rookie cup.

Quinn continued to race in the F4 British Championship in 2017, partnering Oscar Piastri and Ayrton Simmons at TRS Arden. He would end up finishing fourth in the standings, beating Simmons but finishing behind Piastri, with the Australian becoming vice-champion.

Quinn also made a one-off appearance in the BRDC British Formula 3 Championship that same year, scoring a podium at Donington with Lanan Racing.

=== British GT Championship ===
In 2018, Quinn competed in six races of the British GT Championship in the GT4 class. Driving for Steller Performance, Quinn scored no points.

=== Formula Renault Eurocup ===
At the start of 2019, Quinn wasn't able to find a place in a championship. However, midway through the season, he was given the opportunity to make his debut in the Formula Renault Eurocup for his former F4 team Arden Motorsport. He drove in three weekends, managing to score a podium at the Nürburgring and at Catalunya respectively. Quinn finished 13th in the final standings.

In 2020, Quinn substituted for Jackson Walls, who was unable to travel to Europe due to COVID-19 travel restrictions. Quinn got pole position for the first race of the season, scored a total of five podiums throughout the season and won the second race at Spa, helping him to fourth in the drivers' championship. He also won the rookie title.

=== Formula Regional European ===
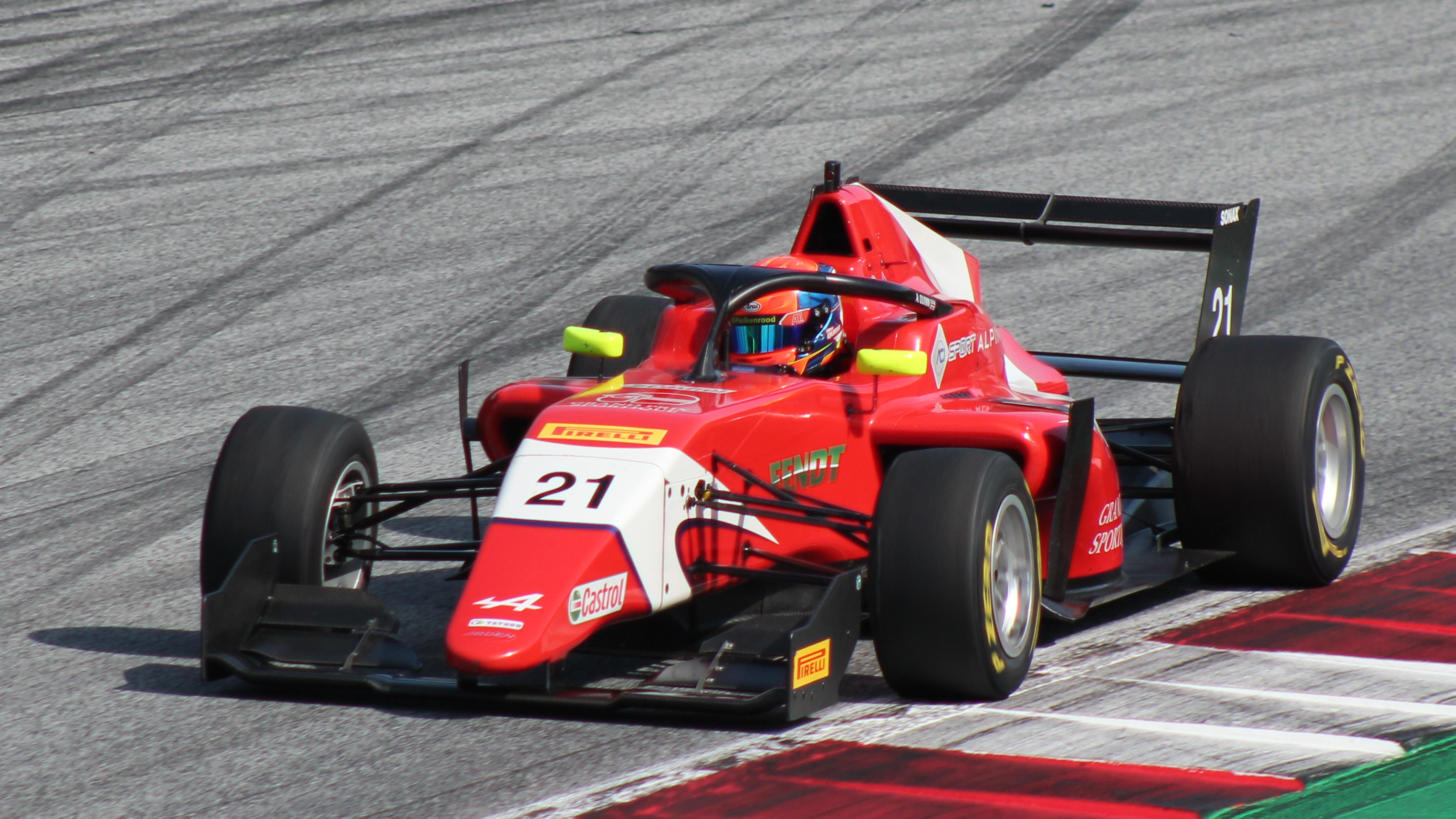
Quinn racing at the Red Bull Ring in 2021.

For the 2021 campaign, Quinn remained with Arden, competing in the Formula Regional European Championship. As a result of achieving second places in Imola and Barcelona respectively, Quinn ended up ninth in the drivers' standings.

=== U.S. F2000 National Championship ===
In May 2022, Velocity Racing Development and Arden International announced a collaboration which resulted in Quinn making a one-off appearance in the U.S. F2000 National Championship at the Indianapolis Motor Speedway. There, he would take victory in all three races of the weekend, a performance he capped off by taking the fastest lap on two occasions.

== Sportscar career ==
=== 2023: Part-time debut ===
Quinn made his debut in sportscar racing at the start of 2023, competing in the 24 Hours of Daytona for the PR1/Mathiasen Motorsports outfit. With the team's amateur driver Ben Keating having scored pole position in the LMP2 category, Quinn, along with Paul-Loup Chatin and Nicolas Lapierre, finished the race in seventh place. Quinn showed an impressive performance in his first endurance event, setting the fastest lap in class. During the season, Quinn would join Chatin and Keating for the Michelin Endurance Cup rounds, helping them towards two podiums at Watkins Glen and Road Atlanta that earned the pair the overall LMP2 title.

=== 2024: ELMS success; Le Mans debut ===
For the following year, Quinn was initially announced to become the designated Endurance Cup driver in IMSA for United Autosports, however an upgrade of his driver categorization from silver to gold forced the Briton out of the seat. After competing at the 24 Hours of Daytona as the fourth driver for AO Racing, the Brit entered into the Pro-Am category of the European Le Mans Series with Algarve Pro Racing, partnering Richard Bradley and bronze-ranked Kriton Lendoudis. In addition, Quinn was able to make his 24 Hours of Le Mans debut with AO in the LMP2 Pro-Am subclass, finishing sixth in the overall category and second in the subclass alongside Louis Delétraz and team owner P. J. Hyett. The ELMS season began with fourth and sixth places, before a well-worked strategy earned the No. 20 team a victory at Imola. Tidy performances gave Quinn and his teammates third at Spa and second at Mugello, which kept the squad in the title fight going into Portimão. There, Quinn stayed out during the final stint and saved fuel in order to try and win the title. He led until being overtaken by a fully-fueled Bent Viscaal on the final lap, which demoted the No. 20 Apr crew to second in both the race and the Pro-Am standings.

In the winter of 2024–25, Quinn joined Lendoudis and Olli Caldwell to race for APR in the Asian Le Mans Series. Sixth in race one at Sepang was followed by good fortune in race two, as Algarve Pro's gamble on wet-weather tyres paid off to promote them to third before the race was abandoned. In Dubai, the team returned to the podium with third in race 1. The following day, Quinn made several overtakes in the closing stages of race 2 and benefited from a late collision for the leading Tom Dillmann to take the victory. Abu Dhabi saw Quinn shine once again, as he crossed the line in second following a gamble on fuel strategy. Due to a steering column failure in race 2 of the weekend, the team dropped to fourth in the LMP2 standings.

=== 2025 ===
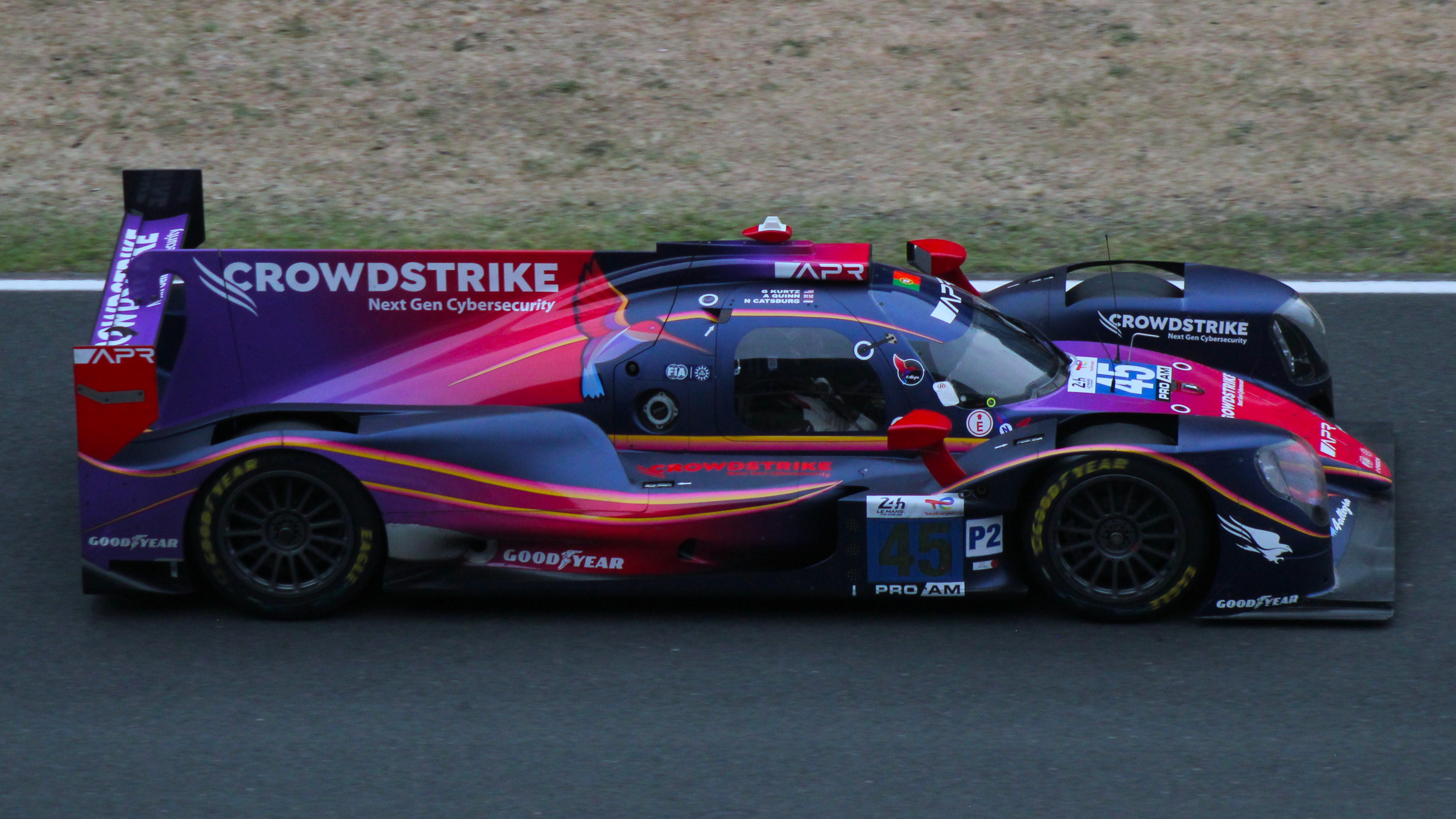
Quinn's No. 45 car at the 2025 24 Hours of Le Mans

Quinn remained in the ELMS for the 2025 season, remaining at APR alongside Caldwell and Lendoudis. After finishing second in class at Barcelona, both Quinn and Caldwell suffered penalties at Le Castellet and finished sixth. Despite late-race contact in the 4 Hours of Imola with Mathias Beche, Quinn held on to third place. In Spa-Francorchamps, Quinn benefited from a late Full-Course Yellow period to overcut Marino Sato for the race lead, allowing him to claim fourth overall and the win in Pro-Am. Thanks to these results, the team vaulted to the championship lead. Quinn became the catalyst for APR's victory at the next round in Silverstone: he charged into the lead as the rain picked up during his first stint, before battling Louis Delétraz hard to keep his position. Though Delétraz got past, he was later penalised for driving standards, and Quinn inherited the win of the red-flag-shortened race by just over a tenth of a second. In the week after this victory, Quinn was confirmed to remain with Algarve Pro for the 2026 season. At the final round in Portimão, a mid-race collision forced the Algarve Pro team to spend multiple laps in the garage, causing them to fall to second in the LMP2 Pro-Am standings.

A week after the ELMS season's conclusion, it was announced that Quinn would join Nick Cassidy and Mathias Beche at the FIA World Endurance Championship's rookie test in Bahrain, driving the Peugeot 9X8. In November 2025, Quinn was confirmed to join Peugeot Sport as a test and development driver for the 2026 FIA World Endurance Championship season.

== Personal life ==
Quinn comes from a family of farmers; away from racing he works on his uncle's family farm, near Camelford.

== Karting record ==
=== Karting career summary ===
Season	Series	Team	Position
2011	Dunkeswell Kart Racing Club - Honda Cadet		1st
2011	South West Championship - Honda Cadet		1st
2012	Super One Series - Comer Cadet	Fusion Motorsport	7th
2012	MSA British Championship - Cadet	Fusion Motorsport	7th
2013	Kartmasters British GP - Honda Cadet		4th
2013	Kartmasters British GP - IAME Cadet		1st
2013	Super One Series - IAME Cadet	Fusion Junior	2nd
2013	Super One Series - Comer Cadet		1st
2013	LGM Series - IAME Cadet		1st
2013	British Open Championship - IAME Cadet	Fusion Motorsport	1st
2014	Rotax International Open - Junior		2nd
2014	Rotax Max Wintercup - Junior Max		9th
2014	Super 1 Series - Mini Max		2nd
2014	Kartmasters British GP - Rotax Junior		13th
2014	Kartmasters British GP - Mini Max		2nd
2014	FIA Kart World Championship - KF Junior		30th
2014	Rotax Max Euro Trophy - Junior Max	Coles Racing	5th
2014	Rotax Max Challenge Grand Finals - Junior Max	Coles Racing	17th
2015	Rotax Max Wintercup - Junior Max	CRG SPA	34th
2015	Rotax Max Euro Trophy - Junior Max	CRG SPA	15th
2015	FIA Kart World Championship - KF Junior	CRG SPA	32nd
2015	CIK-FIA Karting European Championship - KF Junior		7th

== Racing record ==
=== Racing career summary ===
Season	Series	Team	Races	Wins	Poles	F/Laps	Podiums	Points	Position
2016	F4 British Championship	Fortec Motorsport	31	3	2	1	6	248	7th
2017	F4 British Championship	TRS Arden Junior Racing Team	30	4	1	4	11	307	4th
2017	BRDC British Formula 3 Championship	Lanan Racing	3	0	0	0	1	46	20th
2018	British GT Championship - GT4	Steller Performance	6	0	0	0	0	0	NC
2019	Formula Renault Eurocup	Arden	6	0	0	0	2	48	12th
2020	Formula Renault Eurocup	Arden Motorsport	20	1	1	1	5	183	4th
2021	Formula Regional European Championship	Arden Motorsport	20	0	0	0	2	104	9th
2022	U.S. F2000 National Championship	Velocity Racing Development	3	3	0	2	3	93	17th
2023	IMSA SportsCar Championship - LMP2	PR1/Mathiasen Motorsports	4	0	0	2	2	950	10th
2024	European Le Mans Series - LMP2 Pro-Am	Algarve Pro Racing	6	1	0	0	4	96	**2nd**
2024	IMSA SportsCar Championship - LMP2	AO Racing	1	0	0	0	0	254	50th
2024	24 Hours of Le Mans - LMP2	AO by TF	1	0	0	0	0	N/A	6th
2024–25	Asian Le Mans Series - LMP2	Algarve Pro Racing	6	1	0	0	4	83	4th
2025	European Le Mans Series - LMP2 Pro-Am	Algarve Pro Racing	6	2	0	1	4	95	**2nd**
2025	24 Hours of Le Mans - LMP2 Pro-Am	Algarve Pro Racing	1	0	0	0	0	N/A	8th
2025	IMSA SportsCar Championship - LMP2	CrowdStrike Racing by APR	2	0	0	1	0	456	40th
2025–26	Asian Le Mans Series - LMP2	Nielsen Racing	6	0	0	0	0	28	9th
2026	IMSA SportsCar Championship - LMP2	CrowdStrike Racing by APR	7	2	0	2	5	2322	**1st**
2026	24 Hours of Le Mans - LMP2 Pro-Am	CrowdStrike Racing by APR	1	1	1	0	1	N/A	**1st**
2026	European Le Mans Series - LMP2 Pro-Am	Nielsen Racing	6	1	0	0	1	34	10th
2026	FIA World Endurance Championship - Hypercar	Peugeot TotalEnergies	2	0	0	0	0	4	26th

* Season still in progress.

=== Complete F4 British Championship results ===
(key) (Races in bold indicate pole position) (Races in italics indicate fastest lap)

Year	Team	1	2	3	4	5	6	7	8	9	10	11	12	13	14	15	16	17	18	19	20	21	22	23	24	25	26	27	28	29	30	31	DC	Points
2016	Fortec Motorsports	BRH; 1; 8	BRH; 2; 7	BRH; 3; 5	**DON**; **1**; 1	DON; 2; 9	DON; 3; 6	THR; 1; 4	THR; 2; 12	THR; 3; 7	OUL; 1; 4	OUL; 2; 3	OUL; 3 Ret	CRO; 1 Ret	CRO; 2 Ret	CRO; 3; 4	SNE; 1; 9	SNE; 2; 6	SNE; 3; 15	KNO; 1; 1	KNO; 2; 4	**KNO**; **3**; 3	ROC; 1; 2	ROC; 2; 5	ROC; 3; 5	SIL; 1; 9	SIL; 2; 1	SIL; 3; 10	BRH; 1; 8	BRH; 2; 8	BRH; 3; 11		7th	248
2017	TRS Arden Junior Racing Team	BRH; 1; 2	BRH; 2; 7	BRH; 3; 3	DON; 1 Ret	DON; 2 DNS	DON; 3; 9	THR; 1; 2	THR; 2; 6	**THR**; **3**; 11	OUL; 1; 2	OUL; 2; 8	OUL; 3 C	CRO; 1; 5	CRO; 2; 1	CRO; 3; 2	SNE; 1; 5	SNE; 2; 3	SNE; 3; 5	KNO; 1; 4	KNO; 2 Ret	KNO; 3; 4	KNO; 4; 2	ROC; 1; 6	ROC; 2; 1	ROC; 3; 7	SIL; 1; 1	SIL; 2; 11	SIL; 3 Ret	BRH; 1 Ret	BRH; 2; 9	BRH; 3; 1	4th	307

=== Complete BRDC British Formula 3 Championship results ===
(key) (Races in bold indicate pole position) (Races in italics indicate fastest lap)

Year	Team	1	2	3	4	5	6	7	8	9	10	11	12	13	14	15	16	17	18	19	20	21	22	23	24	DC	Points
2017	Lanan Racing	OUL; 1	OUL; 2	OUL; 3	ROC; 1	ROC; 2	ROC; 3	SNE; 1	SNE; 2	SNE; 3	SIL; 1	SIL; 2	SIL; 3	SPA; 1	SPA; 2	SPA; 3	BRH; 1	BRH; 2	BRH; 3	SNE; 1	SNE; 2	SNE; 3	DON; 1; 11	DON; 2; 9	DON; 3; 3	20th	46

=== Complete Formula Renault Eurocup results ===
(key) (Races in bold indicate pole position) (Races in italics indicate fastest lap)

Year	Team	1	2	3	4	5	6	7	8	9	10	11	12	13	14	15	16	17	18	19	20	DC	Points
2019	Arden	MNZ; 1	MNZ; 2	SIL; 1	SIL; 2	MON; 1	MON; 2	LEC; 1	LEC; 2	SPA; 1	SPA; 2	NÜR; 1; 4	NÜR; 2; 2	HUN; 1; 8	HUN; 2 Ret	CAT; 1; 3	CAT; 2; 11	HOC; 1	HOC; 2	YMC; 1	YMC; 2	12th	48
2020	Arden Motorsport	**MNZ**; **1**; 2	MNZ; 2 Ret	IMO; 1; 5	IMO; 2; 3	NÜR; 1; 13	NÜR; 2; 9	MAG; 1; 5	MAG; 2; 5	ZAN; 1; 8	ZAN; 2; 12	CAT; 1; 7	CAT; 2 Ret	SPA; 1; 4‡	SPA; 2; 1	IMO; 1; 2	IMO; 2; 4	HOC; 1; 3	HOC; 2; 4	LEC; 1; 5	LEC; 2; 5	4th	183

^{‡} Half points awarded as less than 75% of race distance was completed.

=== Complete Formula Regional European Championship results ===
(key) (Races in bold indicate pole position) (Races in italics indicate fastest lap)

Year	Team	1	2	3	4	5	6	7	8	9	10	11	12	13	14	15	16	17	18	19	20	DC	Points
2021	Arden Motorsport	IMO; 1; 2	IMO; 2 Ret	CAT; 1; 4	CAT; 2; 2	MCO; 1; 6	MCO; 2; 4	LEC; 1; 6	LEC; 2; 21	ZAN; 1; 10	ZAN; 2 Ret	SPA; 1; 10	SPA; 2 Ret	RBR; 1; 4	RBR; 2; 8	VAL; 1; 6	VAL; 2; 15	MUG; 1; 14	MUG; 2; 11	MNZ; 1; 13	MNZ; 2; 11	9th	104

=== American open-wheel racing results ===
==== USF2000 Championship ====
(key) (Races in bold indicate pole position) (Races in italics indicate fastest lap) (Races with * indicate most race laps led)

Year	Team	1	2	3	4	5	6	7	8	9	10	11	12	13	14	15	16	17	18	Rank	Points
2022	Velocity Racing Development	STP; 1	STP; 2	ALA; 1	ALA; 2	IMS; 1; 1	IMS; 2; 1	IMS; 3; 1*	IRP	ROA; 1	ROA; 2	MOH; 1	MOH; 2	MOH; 3	TOR; 1	TOR; 2	POR; 1	POR; 2	POR; 3	17th	93

=== Complete IMSA SportsCar Championship results ===
(key) (Races in bold indicate pole position; results in italics indicate fastest lap)

Year	Team	Class	Make	Engine	1	2	3	4	5	6	7	Pos.	Points
2023	PR1/Mathiasen Motorsports	LMP2	Oreca 07	Gibson GK428 4.2 L V8	**DAY**; 7	**SEB**; 4	LGS	WGL; 3	ELK	IMS	**PET**; 3	10th	950
2024	AO Racing	LMP2	Oreca 07	Gibson GK428 4.2 L V8	DAY; 8	SEB	WGL	MOS	ELK	IMS	PET	50th	254
2025	CrowdStrike Racing by APR	LMP2	Oreca 07	Gibson GK428 4.2 L V8	DAY	SEB	WGL	MOS; 11	ELK	IMS	PET; 10	40th	456
2026	CrowdStrike Racing by APR	LMP2	Oreca 07	Gibson GK428 4.2 L V8	DAY; 1	SEB; 5	WGL; 2	MOS; 2	ELK; 2	IMS; 9	PET; 1	1st	2322

=== Complete European Le Mans Series results ===
(key) (Races in bold indicate pole position; results in italics indicate fastest lap)

Year	Entrant	Class	Chassis	Engine	1	2	3	4	5	6	Rank	Points
2024	Algarve Pro Racing	LMP2 Pro-Am	Oreca 07	Gibson GK428 4.2 L V8	CAT; 4	LEC; 6	IMO; 1	SPA; 3	MUG; 2	ALG; 2	2nd	96
2025	Algarve Pro Racing	LMP2 Pro-Am	Oreca 07	Gibson GK428 4.2 L V8	CAT; 2	LEC; 6	IMO; 3	SPA; 1	SIL; 1	ALG; 8	2nd	95
2026	Nielsen Racing	LMP2 Pro-Am	Oreca 07	Gibson GK428 4.2 L V8	CAT; Ret	LEC; 1	IMO; 11	SPA; 8	SIL; 10	ALG; 8	10th	34

^{*} Season still in progress.

=== Complete 24 Hours of Le Mans results ===
Year	Team	Co-Drivers	Car	Class	Laps	Pos.	Class Pos.
2024	(United States) AO by TF	(Switzerland) Louis Delétraz (United States) P. J. Hyett	Oreca 07-Gibson	LMP2	295	20th	6th
2024	(United States) AO by TF	(Switzerland) Louis Delétraz (United States) P. J. Hyett	Oreca 07-Gibson	LMP2 Pro-Am	295	20th	**2nd**
2025	(Portugal) Algarve Pro Racing	(Netherlands) Nicky Catsburg (United States) George Kurtz	Oreca 07-Gibson	LMP2	362	30th	13th
2025	(Portugal) Algarve Pro Racing	(Netherlands) Nicky Catsburg (United States) George Kurtz	Oreca 07-Gibson	LMP2 Pro-Am	362	30th	8th
2026	(United States) CrowdStrike Racing by APR	(Germany) Laurin Heinrich (United States) George Kurtz	Oreca 07-Gibson	LMP2	358	21st	7th
2026	(United States) CrowdStrike Racing by APR	(Germany) Laurin Heinrich (United States) George Kurtz	Oreca 07-Gibson	LMP2 Pro-Am	358	21st	**1st**

=== Complete Asian Le Mans Series results ===
(key) (Races in bold indicate pole position) (Races in italics indicate fastest lap)

Year	Team	Class	Car	Engine	1	2	3	4	5	6	Pos.	Points
2024–25	Algarve Pro Racing	LMP2	Oreca 07	Gibson GK428 4.2 L V8	SEP; 1; 6	SEP; 2; 3	DUB; 1; 3	DUB; 2; 1	ABU; 1; 2	ABU; 2; 9	4th	83
2025–26	Nielsen Racing	LMP2	Oreca 07	Gibson GK428 4.2 L V8	SEP; 1; 4	SEP; 2; 9	DUB; 1; 7	DUB; 2; 14	ABU; 1; 14	ABU; 2; 6	9th	28

=== Complete FIA World Endurance Championship results ===
(key) (Races in bold indicate pole position; results in italics indicate fastest lap)

Year	Entrant	Class	Chassis	Engine	1	2	3	4	5	6	7	8	Rank	Points
2026	Peugeot TotalEnergies	Hypercar	Peugeot 9X8	Peugeot X6H 2.6 L Turbo V6	IMO	SPA	LMS	SÃO	COA	FUJ	CAT; 12	MNZ; 8	26th	4
