= F4 British Championship =

Junior open-wheel racing championship in the United Kingdom certified by the FIA

Wera Tools F4 British Championship certified by FIA
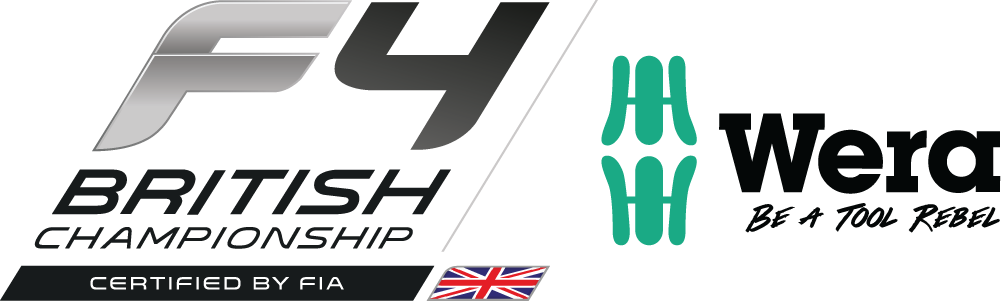
- Category: FIA Formula 4
- Country: United Kingdom
- Inaugural season: 2015
- Constructors: Tatuus
- Engine suppliers: Abarth
- Tyre suppliers: Pirelli
- Drivers' champion: (Belgium) Dries Van Langendonck
- Teams' champion: (United Kingdom) Hitech Grand Prix
- Official website: http://fiaformula4.com/

The F4 British Championship, officially known as the Wera Tools F4 British Championship certified by FIA for sponsorship reasons and formerly known as MSA Formula in 2015, is a single-seater motorsport series based in the United Kingdom. The series is run to FIA Formula 4 regulations and is administered by Motorsport UK. The championship is designed as a low-cost entrance to car racing, and is aimed at young racing drivers moving up from karting.

The championship replaces the British Formula Ford Championship, and used a chassis produced by Mygale and engines from Ford for seven seasons from 2015 to 2021. With Motorsport UK taking over the organization of the championship from 2022 to 2024, as Ford concluded their involvement, the championship switched to a Tatuus chassis and Abarth engines.

The series is part of the TOCA tour, a series of events run alongside the British Touring Car Championship.

== Championship format ==
Each championship event consists of three races. The series is run in support of the BTCC.

Fifteen-year-olds are eligible to compete in the series, after the MSA lowered the age limit for single-seater championships. The winner of the championship will be named the FIA Formula 4 champion, and will be rewarded a test with a top-level regional Formula Three team.

== The car ==
=== 2015–2021 ===
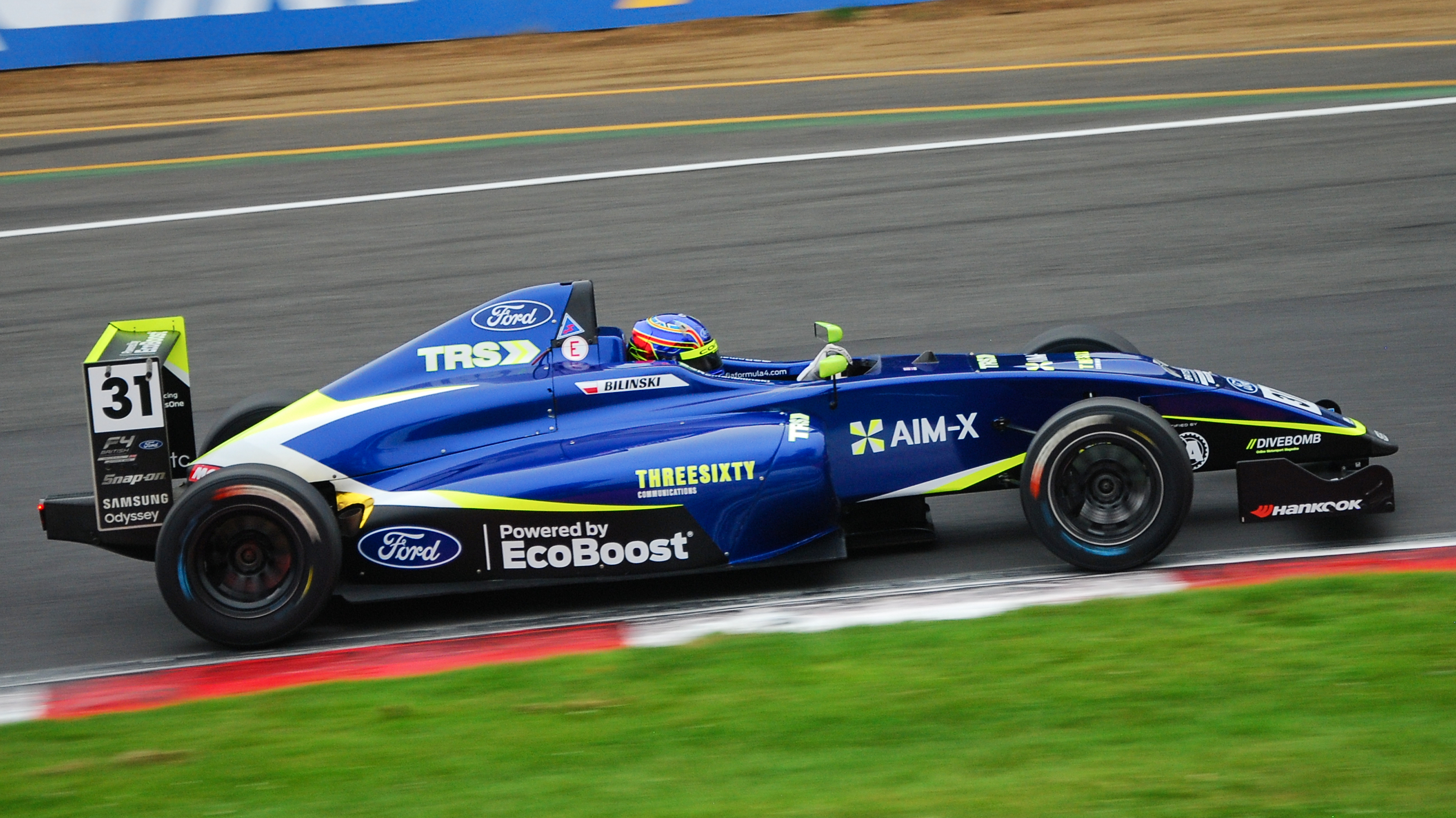
The Mygale M14-F4 driven by Roman Bilinski in 2021

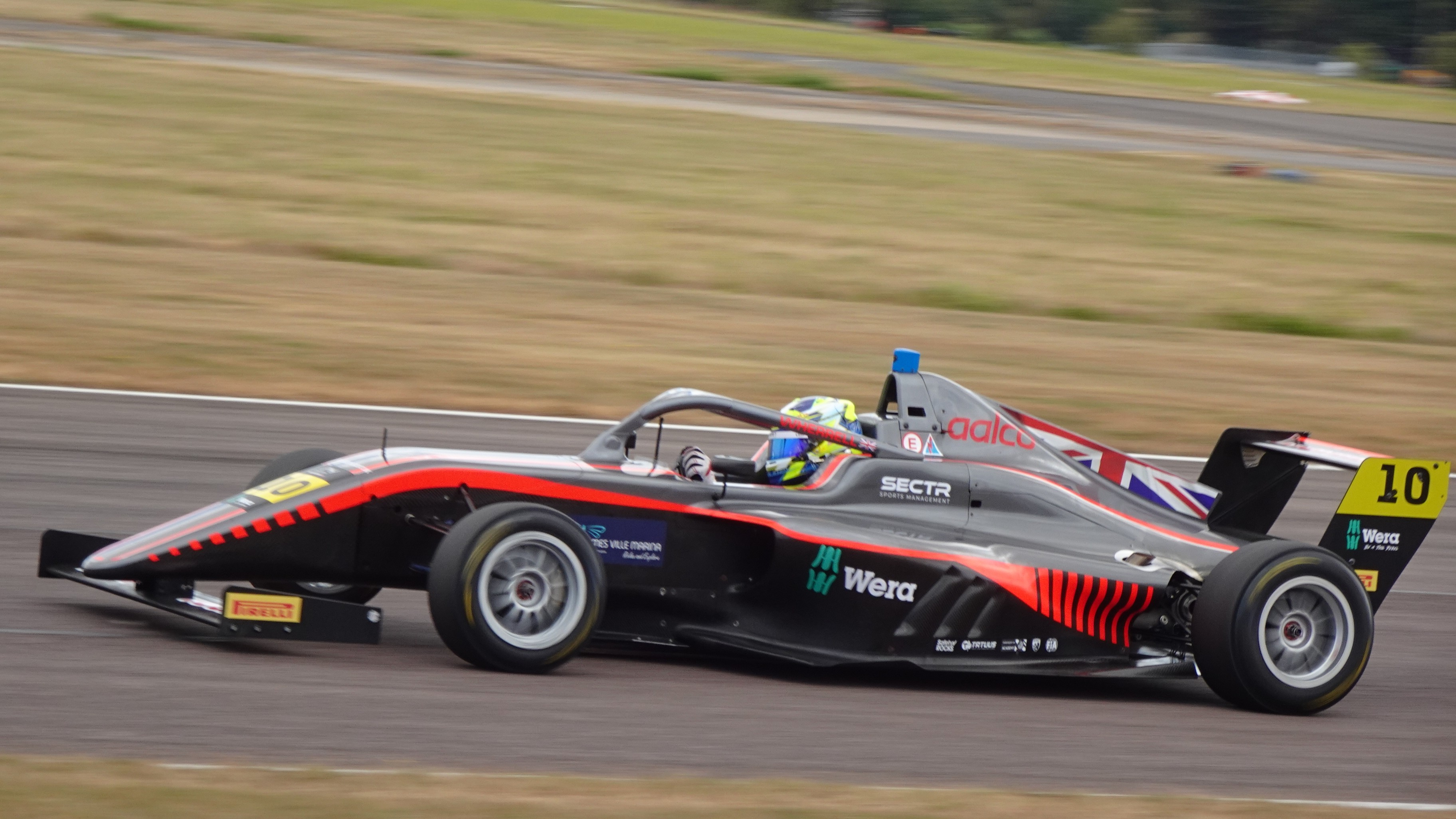
Lewis Wherrell driving the Tatuus F4-T421 in 2026

Mygale M14-F4 provided a carbon-fibre monocoque chassis. The engine was a Ford 1.6L EcoBoost engine as used in the more modern Formula Ford cars, tuned to a maximum of 160 PS. All engines were prepared and tuned by Neil Brown Engineering, to lower costs and ensure engine equalisation. Hankook was the sole tyre supplier, with the cars running on the same compound and construction rubber as used in Formula Three. Sadev provided the sequential paddle shift transmission. The engine control unit was an F88GDI4 from Life Racing which featured integrated paddle shift control, GPS track mapping and also functions as the complete data acquisition system.

The total price of purchasing the car is capped at £36,000.

=== 2022–present ===
Starting from the 2022 season, teams have started using the combination of Tatuus F4-T421 chassis and the engines supplied by Abarth.

== Champions ==
=== Drivers ===
Season	Driver	Team	Races	Poles	Wins	Podiums	Fastest laps	Points	Margin
2015	(United Kingdom) Lando Norris	(United Kingdom) Carlin	30	10	8	15	9	413	42
2016	(United Kingdom) Max Fewtrell	(United Kingdom) Carlin	30	3	3	16	3	358	7
2017	(United Kingdom) Jamie Caroline	(United Kingdom) Carlin	30	4	10	16	6	442	65.5
2018	(United Kingdom) Kiern Jewiss	(United Kingdom) Double R Racing	30	2	6	18	7	445	71
2019	(Barbados) Zane Maloney	(United Kingdom) Carlin	30	6	10	15	5	427	20
2020	(United Kingdom) Luke Browning	(United Kingdom) Fortec Motorsports	26	6	7	16	7	412.5	4
2021	(United Kingdom) Matthew Rees	(United Kingdom) JHR Developments	30	7	4	10	3	331	25
2022	(Republic of Ireland) Alex Dunne	(United Kingdom) Hitech Grand Prix	27	11	11	17	11	412	69
2023	(New Zealand) Louis Sharp	(United Kingdom) Rodin Carlin	30	4	6	14	4	384	13
2024	(United Kingdom) Deagen Fairclough	(United Kingdom) Hitech Pulse-Eight	30	15	14	22	19	579.5	222.5
2025	(Republic of Ireland) Fionn McLaughlin	(United Kingdom) Hitech TGR	30	3	5	14	8	363.5	52
2026	(Belgium) Dries Van Langendonck	(New Zealand) Rodin Motorsport	27	8	8	12	5	344	48.5

=== Teams ===
Season	Team	Drivers	Poles	Wins	Podiums	Fastest laps	Points	Margin
2015	(United Kingdom) Carlin	3	13	12	27	17	712	85
2016	(United Kingdom) Carlin	4	11	12	41	15	618	113
2017	(United Kingdom) Carlin	4	6	12	30	10	869.5	101
2018	(United Kingdom) TRS Arden Junior Racing Team	4	9	11	39	15	837	39
2019	(United Kingdom) Double R Racing	3	8	11	31	13	730	179
2020	(United Kingdom) Carlin	3	3	10	23	5	609.5	55.5
2021	(United Kingdom) JHR Developments	5	11	13	29	12	648	73
2022	(United Kingdom) Carlin	3	5	6	39	9	789	153
2023	(United Kingdom) Rodin Carlin	4	9	15	29	9	692	40
2024	(United Kingdom) Hitech Pulse-Eight	6	16	17	33	22	807.5	66.5
2025	(New Zealand) Rodin Motorsport	6	6	10	18	5	537	1.5
2026	(United Kingdom) Hitech	5	5	5	22	10	601.5	125.5

=== Rookie class ===
Season	Driver	Team	Races	Poles	Wins	Podiums	Fastest laps	Points	Margin
2015	(United Kingdom) Enaam Ahmed	(United Kingdom) TRS Arden Junior Racing Team	30	0	6	17	0	440	32
2016	(United Kingdom) Alex Quinn	(United Kingdom) Fortec Motorsports	30	2	16	26	1	589	159
2018	(Australia) Jack Doohan	(United Kingdom) TRS Arden Junior Racing Team	30	0	12	25	7	548	15
2019	(Barbados) Zane Maloney	(United Kingdom) Carlin	30	6	21	26	5	608.5	180.5
2020	(Australia) Christian Mansell	(United Kingdom) Carlin	26	0	14	23	0	496.5	61.5
2021	(United Kingdom) Matthew Rees	(United Kingdom) JHR Developments	30	7	9	19	3	426	29
2022	(United States) Ugo Ugochukwu	(United Kingdom) Carlin	30	3	16	24	8	506	35
2023	(Sweden) Gustav Jonsson	(United Kingdom) Chris Dittmann Racing	30	0	11	24	1	489	26
2024	(Hungary) Martin Molnár	(United Kingdom) Virtuosi Racing	30	0	7	22	0	403	11
2025	(Republic of Ireland) Fionn McLaughlin	(United Kingdom) Hitech TGR	30	3	17	24	8	524	200.5
2026	(Belgium) Dries Van Langendonck	(New Zealand) Rodin Motorsport	27	8	11	22	5	415	24.5

=== Nations Cup ===
Season	Country	Races	Poles	Wins	Podiums	Fastest laps	Points	Margin
2015	United States	30	3	14	26	8	590	2

=== Ford F4 Challenge Cup ===
Season	Driver	Team	Races	Poles	Wins	Podiums	Fastest laps	Points	Margin
2017	(Sweden) Hampus Ericsson	(United Kingdom) Fortec Motorsports	21	0	9	18	0	367.5	16

== Circuits ==
- **Bold** denotes a circuit was used in the 2026 season.
- **Italic** denotes a circuit will be used in the 2027 season.

Number	Circuits	Rounds	Years
1	(England) **Brands Hatch**	23 (Note: Brands Hatch hosted 2 rounds in 2015—2024, 2026, and it will host 2 rounds in 2027.)	2015–present
2	(England) **Donington Park**	16 (Note: Donington Park hosted 2 rounds in 2023—2026, and it will host 2 rounds in 2027.)	2015–present
3	(England) **Thruxton Circuit**	15 (Note: Thruxton Circuit hosted 2 rounds in 2019 and 2021–2022.)	2015–2026
3	(England) **Silverstone Circuit**	15 (Note: Silverstone Circuit hosted 2 rounds in 2024—2026, and it will host 2 rounds in 2027.)	2015–present
5	(England) **Snetterton Circuit**	11	2015–present
5	(Scotland) Knockhill	11	2015–2025
7	(England) **Oulton Park**	10	2015–2023, 2025, 2027
7	(England) **Croft Circuit**	10	2015–2023, 2026
9	(England) Rockingham Motor Speedway	4	2015–2018
10	(Netherlands) **Circuit Zandvoort**	3	2024–2026
11	(Belgium) **Circuit de Spa-Francorchamps**	0	2027
