= 2015 Ginetta Junior Championship =

The 2015 Kick Start Energy Ginetta Junior Championship was a multi-event, one make motor racing championship held across England and Scotland. The championship featured a mix of professional motor racing teams and privately funded drivers, aged between 14 and 17, competing in Ginetta G40s that conformed to the technical regulations for the championship. It formed part of the extensive program of support categories built up around the British Touring Car Championship centrepiece. It was the ninth Ginetta Junior Championship, and commenced on 4 April 2015 at Brands Hatch – on the circuit's Indy configuration – and concluded on 11 October 2015 at the same venue, utilising the Grand Prix circuit, after twenty races held at ten meetings, all in support of the 2015 British Touring Car Championship season.

== Teams and drivers ==
Team	No.	Drivers	Rounds
Tollbar Racing	11	(France) Tristan Charpentier	1–2
Tollbar Racing	12	(United Kingdom) Alex Day	1–6, 8–10
HHC Motorsport	14	(Germany) Sophia Flörsch	1–5
HHC Motorsport	26	(Italy) Devlin DeFrancesco	5–10
HHC Motorsport	28	(United Kingdom) Charlie Fagg	5–10
HHC Motorsport	38	(United Kingdom) Jamie Caroline	All
HHC Motorsport	44	(Denmark) Patrik Matthiesen	All
Total Control Racing	17	(United Kingdom) Matt Chapman	All
Total Control Racing	25	(United Kingdom) Connor Grady	5–10
Total Control Racing	27	(United Kingdom) Dave Wooder	All
Total Control Racing	31	(United Kingdom) Cameron Roberts	1–9
R & J Motorsport	21	(United Kingdom) Lewis Brown	All
R & J Motorsport	42	(United Kingdom) Jonathan Hadfield	All
R & J Motorsport	67	(United Kingdom) Frank Bird	All
R & J Motorsport	83	(United Kingdom) Kyle Hornby	All
Supergreen Racing	22	(United Kingdom) Ben Green	All
JHR Developments	23	(United Kingdom) Billy Monger	All
JHR Developments	33	(United Kingdom) Esmee Hawkey	1–4, 6, 8–10
JHR Developments	45	(United Kingdom) Dan Zelos	All
JHR Developments	66	(United Kingdom) Senna Proctor	All
JHR Developments	77	(United Kingdom) Sebastian Perez	All
JHR Developments	99	(United Kingdom) Rowan Bailey	All
Hillspeed	24	(United Kingdom) Harry Mailer	1–2
Hillspeed	88	(United Kingdom) Benjamin Wallace	1–2
Jam-Sport	41	(United Kingdom) William Stacey	1–6, 9–10
Elite Motorsport	50	(Cyprus) Geri Nicosia	All
Richardson Chassis Engineering	71	(United Kingdom) Will Tregurtha	All
Douglas Motorsport	75	(United Kingdom) Stuart Middleton	All

== Race calendar ==
Round		Circuit	Date	Pole position	Fastest lap	Winning driver	Winning team
1	R1	Brands Hatch (Indy Circuit, Kent)	4 April	(Denmark) Patrik Matthiesen	(United Kingdom) William Stacey	(United Kingdom) Billy Monger	JHR Developments
1	R2	Brands Hatch (Indy Circuit, Kent)	5 April		(Denmark) Patrik Matthiesen	(United Kingdom) Senna Proctor	JHR Developments
2	R3	Donington Park (National Circuit, Leicestershire)	18 April	(United Kingdom) Jonathan Hadfield	(Denmark) Patrik Matthiesen	(United Kingdom) Jonathan Hadfield	R & J Motorsport
2	R4	Donington Park (National Circuit, Leicestershire)	19 April		(Germany) Sophia Flörsch	(United Kingdom) Senna Proctor	JHR Developments
3	R5	Thruxton Circuit (Hampshire)	10 May	(United Kingdom) Stuart Middleton	(United Kingdom) Matt Chapman	(Germany) Sophia Flörsch	HHC Motorsport
3	R6	Thruxton Circuit (Hampshire)	10 May		(United Kingdom) Billy Monger	(Germany) Sophia Flörsch	HHC Motorsport
4	R7	Oulton Park (Island Circuit, Cheshire)	7 June	(United Kingdom) Dave Wooder	(United Kingdom) Jamie Caroline	(United Kingdom) Jamie Caroline	HHC Motorsport
4	R8	Oulton Park (Island Circuit, Cheshire)	7 June		(United Kingdom) Lewis Brown	(United Kingdom) Jamie Caroline	HHC Motorsport
5	R9	Croft Circuit (North Yorkshire)	27 June	(Germany) Sophia Flörsch	(Denmark) Patrik Matthiesen	(United Kingdom) Jamie Caroline	HHC Motorsport
5	R10	Croft Circuit (North Yorkshire)	28 June		(United Kingdom) Jamie Caroline	(United Kingdom) Jamie Caroline	HHC Motorsport
6	R11	Snetterton Motor Racing Circuit (300 Circuit, Norfolk)	8 August	(United Kingdom) Billy Monger	(Denmark) Patrik Matthiesen	(United Kingdom) Jamie Caroline	HHC Motorsport
6	R12	Snetterton Motor Racing Circuit (300 Circuit, Norfolk)	9 August		(United Kingdom) Dan Zelos	(United Kingdom) Billy Monger	JHR Developments
7	R13	Knockhill Racing Circuit (Fife)	22 August	(United Kingdom) Jamie Caroline	(United Kingdom) Jamie Caroline	(United Kingdom) Jamie Caroline	HHC Motorsport
7	R14	Knockhill Racing Circuit (Fife)	23 August		(United Kingdom) Stuart Middleton	(United Kingdom) Senna Proctor	JHR Developments
8	R15	Rockingham Motor Speedway (International Super Sports Car Circuit, Northamptonshire)	5 September	(Italy) Devlin DeFrancesco	(United Kingdom) Stuart Middleton	(United Kingdom) Jamie Caroline	HHC Motorsport
8	R16	Rockingham Motor Speedway (International Super Sports Car Circuit, Northamptonshire)	6 September		(United Kingdom) Jamie Caroline	(United Kingdom) Jamie Caroline	HHC Motorsport
9	R17	Silverstone Circuit (National Circuit, Northamptonshire)	26 September	(United Kingdom) Kyle Hornby	(United Kingdom) Kyle Hornby	(United Kingdom) Jamie Caroline	HHC Motorsport
9	R18	Silverstone Circuit (National Circuit, Northamptonshire)	27 September		(United Kingdom) Matt Chapman	(Denmark) Patrik Matthiesen	HHC Motorsport
10	R19	Brands Hatch (Grand Prix Circuit, Kent)	10 October	(United Kingdom) Senna Proctor	(United Kingdom) Jamie Caroline	(United Kingdom) Jamie Caroline	HHC Motorsport
10	R20	Brands Hatch (Grand Prix Circuit, Kent)	11 October		(United Kingdom) Matt Chapman	(United Kingdom) Senna Proctor	JHR Developments

=== Calendar changes ===
- After using the "International" circuit configuration in 2014, the Oulton Park round reverted to the "Island" layout for 2015.

== Championship standings ==
Points system
**1st**	**2nd**	**3rd**	**4th**	**5th**	**6th**	**7th**	**8th**	**9th**	**10th**	**11th**	**12th**	**13th**	**14th**	**15th**	**16th**	**17th**	**18th**	**19th**	**20th**	R1 PP	FL
35	30	26	22	20	18	16	14	12	11	10	9	8	7	6	5	4	3	2	1	1	1

=== Drivers' championship ===
- A driver's best 18 scores counted towards the championship, with any other points being discarded.

Pos	Driver	BHI		DON		THR		OUL		CRO		SNE		KNO		ROC		SIL		BHGP		Total	Drop	Pen.	Points
1	(United Kingdom) Jamie Caroline	10	2	20	4	4	3	1	**1**	1	**1**	1	8	**1**	**18**	1	**1**	1	**16**	1	**16**	477	−4		473
2	(United Kingdom) Senna Proctor	3	1	2	1	11	9	3	2	13	9	6	2	2	1	3	7	2	2	**4**	1	491	−18		473
3	(United Kingdom) Lewis Brown	8	4	4	3	Ret	Ret	5	5	4	6	4	5	3	2	5	3	7	4	7	2	393		−6	387
4	(United Kingdom) Dan Zelos	9	5	6	5	2	5	2	3	Ret	19	7	3	4	3	4	15	3	7	3	19	366	−2		364
5	(United Kingdom) Billy Monger	1	**14**	3	10	5	2	7	19	3	15	**2**	**1**	Ret	6	9	5	22	20	2	17	330		−5	325
6	(Denmark) Patrik Matthiesen **(R)**	**2**	3	5	9	9	Ret	12	18	5	4	3	16	13	8	11	4	5	1	Ret	7	309			309
7	(United Kingdom) Stuart Middleton **(R)**	4	15	10	17	**3**	4	10	8	7	5	Ret	15	Ret	7	2	2	10	5	5	20	289		−6	283
8	(United Kingdom) Jonathan Hadfield	6	11	**1**	**2**	8	Ret	6	6	8	7	17	9	5	4	20	14	12	18	13	Ret	260	−1		259
9	(United Kingdom) Kyle Hornby **(R)**	15	7	9	6	10	6	16	Ret	6	2	8	Ret	9	9	13	9	**9**	3	6	5	261		−6	255
10	(United Kingdom) Matt Chapman	13	18	16	11	7	8	8	7	Ret	21	Ret	11	6	5	7	6	21	6	9	3	227			227
11	(Germany) Sophia Flörsch **(R)**	5	21	8	8	1	**1**	4	4	**2**	3											220		−9	211
12	(United Kingdom) Will Tregurtha **(R)**	14	6	7	7	6	13	11	10	18	11	9	4	10	19	DNS	DNS	14	17	12	12	187			187
13	(United Kingdom) Dave Wooder **(R)**	11	Ret	Ret	13	16	Ret	**Ret**	9	Ret	18	16	14	15	DNS	6	8	4	8	15	4	153			153
14	(United Kingdom) Alex Day **(R)**	23	20	17	Ret	Ret	14	9	13	11	10	5	7			12	Ret	8	14	8	9	145		−6	139
15	(Cyprus) Geri Nicosia	12	8	11	21	13	15	17	12	19	17	11	6	17	17	Ret	17	13	11	Ret	8	138		−15	123
16	(United Kingdom) William Stacey **(R)**	7	10	Ret	14	12	16	18	11	15	12	12	Ret					16	12	11	15	110			110
17	(United Kingdom) Rowan Bailey **(R)**	20	Ret	13	19	15	12	13	Ret	12	13	19	18	Ret	13	18	13	18	13	14	10	104			104
18	(United Kingdom) Ben Green **(R)**	24	19	14	16	14	10	19	20	9	8	13	19	14	16	10	Ret	17	19	10	Ret	104		−2	102
19	(United Kingdom) Charlie Fagg **(R)**									16	16	12	10	Ret	10	8	10	24	9	18	6	99			99
20	(United Kingdom) Sebastian Perez	21	13	15	20	Ret	11	15	15	10	14	10	Ret	16	12	16	12	21	17	17	14	99		−6	93
21	(United Kingdom) Cameron Roberts **(R)**	18	9	Ret	12	18	7	Ret	16	14	20	Ret	9	8	Ret	15	Ret	6	23			94		−24	70
22	(United Kingdom) Frank Bird	Ret	16	21	18	17	17	Ret	17	20	Ret	15	21	12	14	19	19	20	15	16	11	69			69
23	(Italy) Devlin DeFrancesco **(R)**									Ret	23	20	13	7	11	**14**	11	11	Ret	Ret	18	66			66
24	(United Kingdom) Connor Grady **(R)**									17	22	14	20	11	15	17	16	19	10	20	13	59			59
25	(United Kingdom) Esmee Hawkey	22	Ret	18	22	19	Ret	14	14			Ret	17			21	18	18	22	19	Ret	34			34
26	(United Kingdom) Harry Mailer	17	12	12	15																	28			28
27	(United Kingdom) Benjamin Wallace	19	17	19	23																	8			8
28	(France) Tristan Charpentier **(R)**	16	22	DSQ	DNS																	5		−18	−13
Pos	Driver	BHI		DON		THR		OUL		CRO		SNE		KNO		ROC		SIL		BHGP		Total	Drop	Pen.	Points

Colour	Result
Gold	Winner
Silver	Second place
Bronze	Third place
Green	Points classification
Blue	Non-points classification
Blue	Non-classified finish (NC)
Purple	Retired, not classified (Ret)
Red	Did not qualify (DNQ)
Red	Did not pre-qualify (DNPQ)
Black	Disqualified (DSQ)
White	Did not start (DNS)
White	Withdrew (WD)
White	Race cancelled (C)
Blank	Did not practice (DNP)
Blank	Did not arrive (DNA)
Blank	Excluded (EX)

**Bold** – Pole
Italics – Fastest Lap
**(R)** – Rookie
