= Senna Proctor =

British racing driver (born 1998)

- Proctor driving an Alliance Racing Ford Focus Titanium at Thruxton Circuit in 2026
- Nationality: (United Kingdom) British
- Born: Senna Mark James Proctor; 12 August 1998 (age 28) Driffield, Yorkshire
- Relatives: Mark Proctor (father)

British Touring Car Championship career
- Debut season: 2017
- Current team: NAPA Racing UK
- Years active: 2017–2021, 2025–2026
- Car number: 18
- Former teams: Adrian Flux Subaru Racing, Power Maxed TAG Racing, Excelr8 Motorsport, BTC Racing, Team VERTU
- Starts: 167 (168 entries)
- Wins: 2
- Poles: 2
- Fastest laps: 2

Previous series
- 2016 2014–15: Renault Clio Cup UK; Ginetta Junior Championship

Senna Mark James Proctor (born 12 August 1998) is a British racing driver who serves as a reserve driver and driver coach for NAPA Racing UK driver Sam Osborne in the BTCC. Proctor last competed in the 2025 British Touring Car Championship for Team VERTU. He is the son of racing driver Mark Proctor.

== Career ==
=== Ginetta Junior Championship ===
In 2014, Proctor competed in the Ginetta Junior Championship as a privateer in rounds 1 and 2 and later with JHR Developments for rounds 3 to 10. He placed 12th in the standings, achieving one podium at Knockhill. Proctor stayed in the series for 2015, competing with Team BMR. He took four wins and 13 podiums in this season, and was crowned champion after the final race of the season at Brands Hatch, but lost the title when the result was amended after the race.

=== Renault UK Clio Cup ===
He graduated to the Renault Clio Cup in 2016, again with Team BMR, and finished eighth in the final championship standings.

=== British Touring Car Championship ===
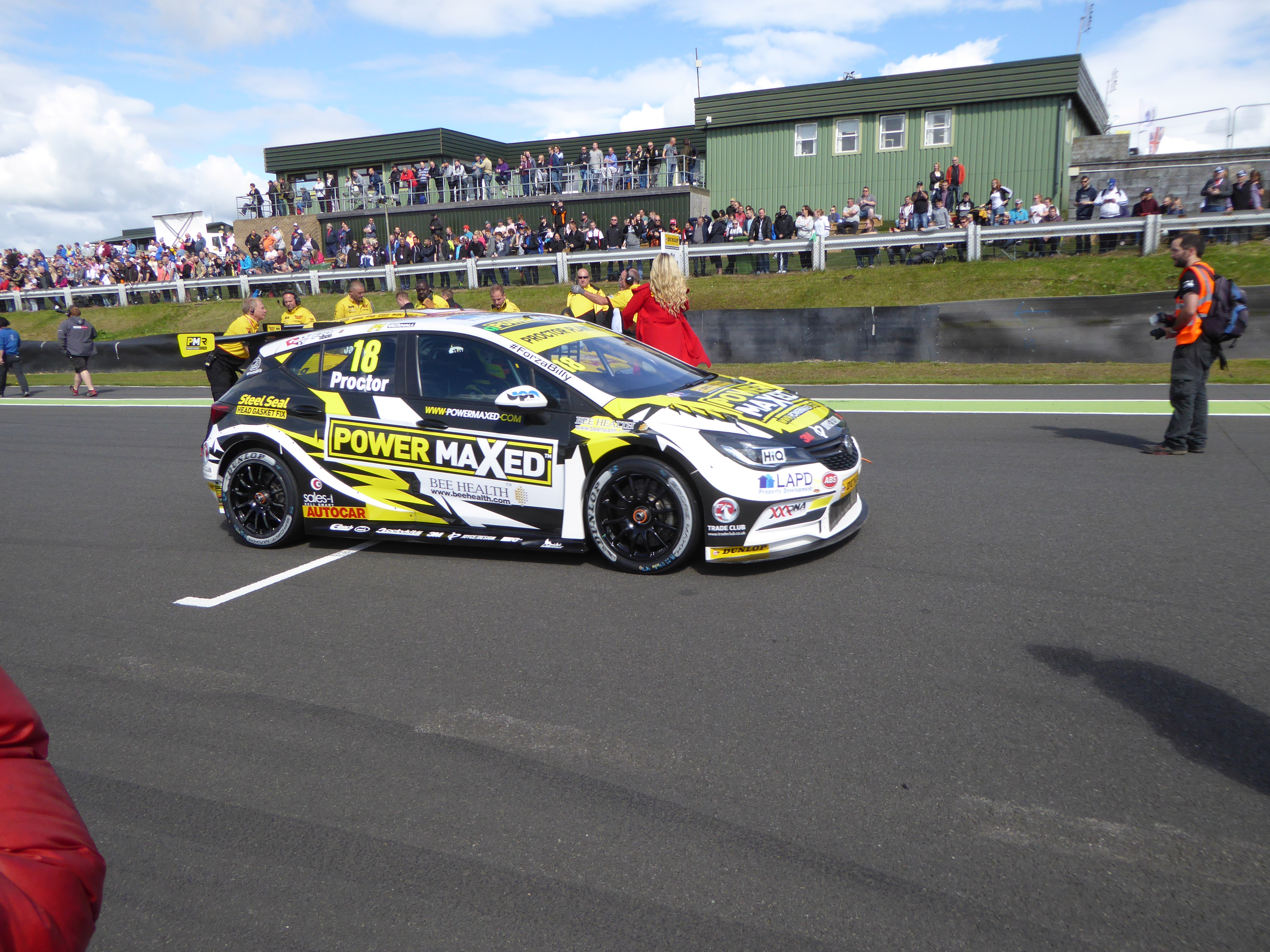
Proctor, at the Knockhill round of the 2017 British Touring Car Championship.

On 6 December 2016, it was announced that Proctor would drive in the British Touring Car Championship for the 2017 season, with Power Maxed Racing, driving a factory supported Vauxhall Astra. In the opening round of the season at the Brands Hatch Indy Circuit, Proctor slid off the track in wet conditions in his first BTCC qualifying session. He did manage to qualify in 16th position, however, with his teammate Tom Chilton in 12th. He ended the year 19th in the standings and claimed the Jack Sears trophy for rookie drivers.

Proctor would stay at Power Maxed Racing for 2018, partnering Josh Cook. He would claim a first career BTCC win at Brands Hatch, ahead of Jake Hill. Proctor would only score 2 more podiums in 2018, being Thruxton and Croft's Race 3.

== Racing record ==
=== Complete Ginetta Junior Championship results ===
(key) (Races in bold indicate pole position in class) (Races in italics indicate fastest lap in class)

Year	Team	1	2	3	4	5	6	7	8	9	10	11	12	13	14	15	16	17	18	19	20	Pos	Pts
2014	Privateer	BHI; 1; 18	BHI; 2; 13	DON; 1; 18	DON; 2; 17																	12th	186
2014	JHR Developments					THR; 1; 11	THR; 2; 9	OUL; 1; 15	OUL; 2; 8	CRO; 1; 11	CRO; 2; 5	SNE; 1; 9	SNE; 2; 7	KNO; 1; 3	KNO; 2; 14	ROC; 1; 17	ROC; 2 Ret	SIL; 1 Ret	SIL; 2; 8	BHGP; 1 Ret	BHGP; 2; 7	12th	186
2015	JHR Developments	BHI; 1; 3	BHI; 2; 1	DON; 1; 2	DON; 2; 1	THR; 1; 11	THR; 2; 9	OUL; 1; 3	OUL; 2; 2	CRO; 1; 13	CRO; 2; 9	SNE; 1; 6	SNE; 2; 2	KNO; 1; 2	KNO; 2; 1	ROC; 1; 3	ROC; 2; 7	SIL; 1; 2	SIL; 2; 2	**BHGP**; **1**; 4	BHGP; 2; 1	2nd	473

=== Complete British Touring Car Championship results ===
(key) (Races in bold indicate pole position – 1 point awarded just in first race; races in italics indicate fastest lap – 1 point awarded all races; * signifies that driver led race for at least one lap – 1 point given all races; ^{Superscript} number indicates points-scoring qualifying race position)

Year	Team	Car	1	2	3	4	5	6	7	8	9	10	11	12	13	14	15	16	17	18	19	20	21	22	23	24	25	26	27	28	29	30	DC	Points
2017	Power Maxed Racing	Vauxhall Astra	BRH; 1; 17	BRH; 2; 13	BRH; 3; 19	DON; 1; 14	DON; 2; 19	DON; 3; 10	THR; 1; 16	THR; 2; 23	THR; 3; 19	OUL; 1; 15	OUL; 2; 18	OUL; 3; 16	CRO; 1; 14	CRO; 2; 13	CRO; 3; 14	SNE; 1; 17	SNE; 2; 23	SNE; 3; 9	KNO; 1; 7	KNO; 2 Ret	KNO; 3; 25	ROC; 1; 21	ROC; 2; 11	ROC; 3; 7	SIL; 1; 15	SIL; 2; 22	SIL; 3; 18	BRH; 1; 6	BRH; 2; 14	BRH; 3 Ret	19th	63
2018	Power Maxed TAG Racing	Vauxhall Astra	BRH; 1; 27	BRH; 2; 1*	BRH; 3; 15	DON; 1; 8	DON; 2; 22	DON; 3 Ret	THR; 1; 7	THR; 2; 6	THR; 3; 3	OUL; 1; 28	OUL; 2; 16	OUL; 3; 12	CRO; 1; 11	CRO; 2; 8	CRO; 3; 3	SNE; 1 NC	SNE; 2; 7	SNE; 3; 11	ROC; 1; 12	ROC; 2; 4	ROC; 3; 14	KNO; 1; 19	KNO; 2; 16	KNO; 3 Ret	SIL; 1; 18	SIL; 2; 10	SIL; 3; 11	BRH; 1; 5	BRH; 2; 7	BRH; 3; 7	12th	170
2019	Adrian Flux Subaru Racing	Subaru Levorg GT	BRH; 1; 17	BRH; 2; 10	BRH; 3; 22	DON; 1; 12	DON; 2; 20	DON; 3; 21	THR; 1; 22	THR; 2; 16	THR; 3; 15	CRO; 1; 15	CRO; 2; 13	CRO; 3; 12	OUL; 1 DSQ	OUL; 2; 18	OUL; 3; 20	SNE; 1; 19	SNE; 2 Ret	SNE; 3 Ret	THR; 1; 29	THR; 2; 29	THR; 3; 20	KNO; 1; 5	KNO; 2; 4	KNO; 3 Ret	SIL; 1; 25	SIL; 2; 15	SIL; 3 NC	BRH; 1 Ret	BRH; 2; 11	**BRH**; **3**; 21	20th	47
2020	Excelr8 Motorsport	Hyundai i30 Fastback N Performance	DON; 1 Ret	DON; 2 DNS	DON; 3 Ret	BRH; 1; 7	BRH; 2; 8	BRH; 3; 9	OUL; 1; 10	OUL; 2; 11	OUL; 3; 6	KNO; 1; 13	KNO; 2; 11	**KNO**; **3**; 2	THR; 1; 11	THR; 2; 10	THR; 3; 12	SIL; 1; 14	SIL; 2; 10	SIL; 3; 6	CRO; 1; 18	CRO; 2; 9	CRO; 3; 9	SNE; 1; 9	SNE; 2; 13	SNE; 3; 10	BRH; 1; 19	BRH; 2; 8	BRH; 3; 19				13th	141
2021	BTC Racing	Honda Civic Type R	THR; 1	THR; 2	THR; 3	SNE; 1; 18	SNE; 2; 16	SNE; 3; 26	BRH; 1; 12	BRH; 2; 10	BRH; 3; 6	**OUL**; **1**; 9	OUL; 2; 9	**OUL**; **3**; 1*	KNO; 1; 2	KNO; 2; 7	KNO; 3; 2	THR; 1; 8	THR; 2; 7	THR; 3; 3	CRO; 1; 3	CRO; 2; 8	CRO; 3; 8	SIL; 1; 14	SIL; 2 Ret	SIL; 3; 17	DON; 1; 4	DON; 2; 6	DON; 3; 27	**BRH**; **1**; 2	BRH; 2 Ret	BRH; 3; 19	10th	206
2025	Team VERTU	Hyundai i30 Fastback N Performance	DON; 1	DON; 2	DON; 3	BRH; 1	BRH; 2	BRH; 3	SNE; 1	SNE; 2	SNE; 3	THR; 1; 9	THR; 2; 6	THR; 3; 4	OUL; 1; 8	OUL; 2; 8	OUL; 3; 5	CRO; 1; 3	CRO; 2; 19	CRO; 3; 3	KNO; 1; 4	KNO; 2; 4	KNO; 3; 13	DON; 1; 8	DON; 2 Ret	DON; 3; 15	SIL; 1; 4	SIL; 2; 16	SIL; 3; 13	BRH; 1; 13	BRH; 2; 3	BRH; 3; 8	10th	167
2026	NAPA Racing UK	Ford Focus Titanium Saloon	DON; 1	DON; 2	DON; 3	BRH; 1	BRH; 2	BRH; 3	SNE; 1	SNE; 2	SNE; 3	OUL; 1	OUL; 2	OUL; 3	THR; 1; 4^{5}	THR; 2; 15	THR; 3; 5	KNO; 1	KNO; 2	KNO; 3	DON; 1	DON; 2	DON; 3	CRO; 1	CRO; 2	CRO; 3	SIL; 1	SIL; 2	SIL; 3	BRH; 1	BRH; 2	BRH; 3	21st	31

Sporting positions
Preceded by Ashley Sutton	Jack Sears Trophy; Winner; 2017	Succeeded by Dan Cammish
