= Jamie Caroline =

British racing driver

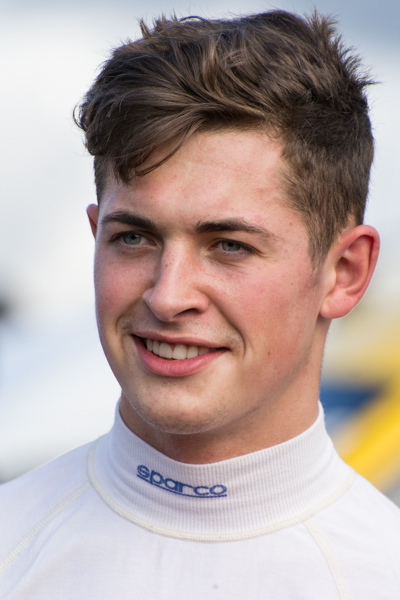
- Nationality: British
- Born: James Lee Caroline; 2 February 1999 (age 27) Warlingham, Surrey, United Kingdom

GT4 European Series career
- Debut season: 2021
- Current team: Trivellato Racing by Villorba Corse
- Categorisation: FIA Silver
- Car number: 70
- Starts: 5
- Wins: 0
- Poles: 0
- Fastest laps: 0

Previous series
- 2014-2015 2016 2017 2018 2019-2020: Ginetta Junior Championship; BRDC British Formula 3 Autumn Trophy; F4 British Championship; U.S. F2000 National Championship; British GT Championship

James Lee Caroline (born 2 February 1999) is a British racing driver who last competed in the British GT Championship with Ram Racing.

== Career ==
=== Ginetta Junior Championship ===
In 2014, Caroline made his car racing debut in the Ginetta Junior Championship with TCR, claiming two victories and finishing sixth overall. The following season, Caroline switched to HHC Motorsport, taking the title in dominant fashion.

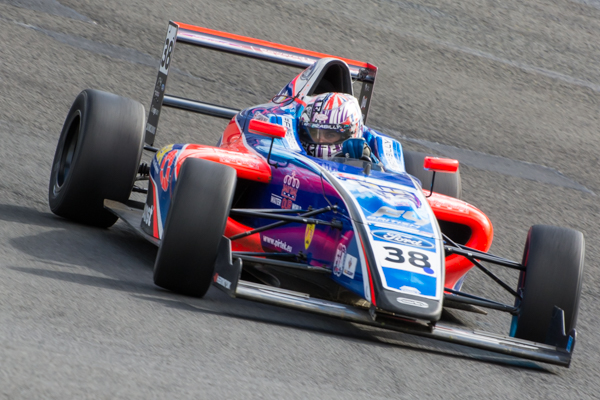
Jamie Caroline 2017 at Knockhill Racing Circuit

=== Formula 4 ===
In 2016, Caroline graduated to British F4, competing in four rounds with Jarum Racing before switching to Fortec Motorsports for the remainder of the season. There, he claimed a victory and finished tenth overall. Caroline remained in the series for 2017, partnering with Carlin. He became the first driver to claim a race weekend grand slam in the British F4 series' history.

On 30 September 2017, Caroline won the British Formula 4 title at Brands Hatch.

=== USF2000 National Championship ===
After initially announcing a sabbatical year due to a lack of funds, Caroline then moved to the U.S. F2000 National Championship for 2018, driving for BN Racing. He finished 25th in the standings after only competing at the opening 2 rounds of the championship.

=== Formula 3 ===
In October 2016, Caroline contested the BRDC British F3 Autumn Trophy with Douglas Motorsport alongside ADAC F4 champion Joey Mawson. He achieved a podium and finished fifth in the overall standings. He returned to the series in 2018 at the Spa round, driving for Carlin. In 2019, he competed in the final round of the F3 Asian Winter Series for BlackArts Racing.

=== British GT ===
In 2019, Caroline entered the Brands Hatch round of the British GT Championship, driving for HHC Motorsport with Ruben Del Sarte.

For the 2020 season, Caroline was entered in TF Sport's GT4 squad, partnered with ex-Carrera Cup driver Dan Vaughan. They finished the season as champions of the GT4 category.

For the 2021 season, Caroline competed in the final two rounds of the British GT Championship with Speedworks Motorsport, partnered with John Ferguson in the Toyota Gazoo Racing GR Supra GT4. In his debut with the car, he qualified second at Oulton Park, behind Darren Turner, and later secured pole position at Donington Park by half a second over Sennan Fielding.

=== GT4 European Series ===
For the 2021 season, Caroline entered the 2021 GT4 European Series, alongside Jean-Luc D'Auria, competing for Trivellato Racing by Villorba Corse in which he did not complete the full season.

== Racing record ==
=== Career summary ===
| Season | Series | Team | Races | Wins | Poles | F/Laps | Podiums | Points | Position |
|---|---|---|---|---|---|---|---|---|---|
| 2014 | Ginetta Junior Championship | TCR | 20 | 2 | 0 | 5 | 5 | 320 | 6th |
| 2014 | Ginetta Junior Winter Series | HHC Motorsport | 4 | 4 | 3 | 3 | 4 | 144 | **1st** |
| 2015 | Ginetta Junior Championship | HHC Motorsport | 20 | 10 | 1 | 4 | 12 | 473 | **1st** |
| 2016 | F4 British Championship | Jamun Racing | 12 | 0 | 0 | 1 | 4 | 181 | 10th |
| 2016 | F4 British Championship | Fortec Motorsports | 18 | 1 | 0 | 1 | 1 | 181 | 10th |
| 2016 | BRDC British Formula 3 Autumn Trophy | Douglas Motorsport | 3 | 0 | 0 | 0 | 1 | 52 | 5th |
| 2017 | F4 British Championship | Carlin | 30 | 10 | 4 | 6 | 16 | 442 | **1st** |
| 2018 | BRDC British Formula 3 Championship | Carlin | 9 | 2 | 1 | 1 | 4 | 164 | 13th |
| 2018 | U.S. F2000 National Championship | BN Racing | 4 | 0 | 0 | 0 | 0 | 40 | 25th |
| 2019 | British GT Championship - GT4 | HHC Motorsport | 1 | 0 | 0 | 0 | 0 | 0 | NC |
| 2020 | British GT Championship - GT4 | TF Sport | 9 | 1 | 0 | 2 | 7 | 170 | **1st** |
| 2021 | GT4 European Series - Silver | Trivellato Racing by Villorba Corse | 8 | 0 | 0 | 0 | 0 | 27 | 16th |
| 2021 | British GT Championship - GT4 | Toyota Gazoo Racing UK | 3 | 0 | 1 | 0 | 1 | 5 | 15th |
| 2022 | British GT Championship - GT3 | Ram Racing | 3 | 0 | 0 | 0 | 0 | 2.5 | 30th |

=== Complete Ginetta Junior Championship results ===
(key) (Races in bold indicate pole position) (Races in italics indicate fastest lap)

| Year | Team | 1 | 2 | 3 | 4 | 5 | 6 | 7 | 8 | 9 | 10 | 11 | 12 | 13 | 14 | 15 | 16 | 17 | 18 | 19 | 20 | DC | Points |
|---|---|---|---|---|---|---|---|---|---|---|---|---|---|---|---|---|---|---|---|---|---|---|---|
| 2014 | Total Control Racing | BHI; 1; 8 | BHI; 2 Ret | DON; 1; 6 | DON; 2; 3 | THR; 1; 2 | THR; 2; 1 | OUL; 1; 3 | OUL; 2 DSQ | CRO; 1 Ret | CRO; 2; 8 | SNE; 1 DSQ | SNE; 2; 5 | KNO; 1; 6 | KNO; 2; 13 | ROC; 1; 4 | ROC; 2; 4 | SIL; 1; 11 | SIL; 2; 5 | BHGP; 1; 1 | BHGP; 2; 2 | 6th | 320 |
| 2015 | HHC Motorsport | BHI; 1; 10 | BHI; 2; 2 | DON; 1; 20 | DON; 2; 4 | THR; 1; 4 | THR; 2; 3 | OUL; 1; 1 | **OUL**; **2**; 1 | CRO; 1; 1 | **CRO**; **2**; 1 | SNE; 1; 1 | SNE; 2; 8 | **KNO**; **1**; 1 | **KNO**; **2**; 18 | ROC; 1; 1 | **ROC**; **2**; 1 | SIL; 1; 1 | **SIL**; **2**; 16 | BHGP; 1; 1 | **BHGP**; **2**; 16 | 1st | 473 |

=== Complete F4 British Championship results ===
(key) (Races in bold indicate pole position) (Races in italics indicate fastest lap)

| Year | Team | 1 | 2 | 3 | 4 | 5 | 6 | 7 | 8 | 9 | 10 | 11 | 12 | 13 | 14 | 15 | 16 | 17 | 18 | 19 | 20 | 21 | 22 | 23 | 24 | 25 | 26 | 27 | 28 | 29 | 30 | 31 | DC | Points |
|---|---|---|---|---|---|---|---|---|---|---|---|---|---|---|---|---|---|---|---|---|---|---|---|---|---|---|---|---|---|---|---|---|---|---|
| 2016 | Jamun Racing | BRH; 1; 6 | BRH; 2; 2 | BRH; 3; 12 | DON; 1; 8 | DON; 2; 5 | DON; 3; 7 | THR; 1; 10 | THR; 2; 2 | THR; 3 Ret | OUL; 1; 3 | OUL; 2 Ret | OUL; 3; 3 | | | | | | | | | | | | | | | | | | | | 10th | 181 |
| 2016 | Fortec Motorsports | | | | | | | | | | | | | CRO; 1; 5 | CRO; 2 Ret | CRO; 3; 8 | SNE; 1 Ret | SNE; 2; 7 | SNE; 3 Ret | KNO; 1; 4 | KNO; 2; 13 | KNO; 3; 8 | ROC; 1; 4 | ROC; 2; 4 | ROC; 3; 14 | SIL; 1; 12 | SIL; 2; 9 | SIL; 3; 14 | BRH; 1; 7 | BRH; 2; 1 | BRH; 3; 9 | | 10th | 181 |
| 2017 | Carlin | **BRH**; **1**; 1 | BRH; 2; 5 | **BRH**; **3**; 1 | DON; 1; 1 | DON; 2; 1 | DON; 3; 15 | THR; 1; 1 | THR; 2; 1 | THR; 3; 1 | **OUL**; **1**; 1 | OUL; 2 Ret | OUL; 3 C | CRO; 1; 4 | CRO; 2; 7 | CRO; 3; 5 | SNE; 1; 8 | SNE; 2; 1 | SNE; 3; 7 | KNO; 1; 2 | **KNO**; **2**; 1 | KNO; 3; 6 | KNO; 4; 5 | ROC; 1; 3 | ROC; 2 Ret | ROC; 3; 3 | SIL; 1; 4 | SIL; 2; 2 | SIL; 3; 2 | BRH; 1; 8 | BRH; 2; 2 | BRH; 3; 6 | 1st | 442 |

=== Complete U.S. F2000 National Championship results ===
| Year | Team | 1 | 2 | 3 | 4 | 5 | 6 | 7 | 8 | 9 | 10 | 11 | 12 | 13 | 14 | Rank | Points |
|---|---|---|---|---|---|---|---|---|---|---|---|---|---|---|---|---|---|
| 2018 | BN Racing | STP; 24 | STP; 4 | IMS; 4 | IMS; 24 | LOR | ROA | ROA | TOR | TOR | MOH | MOH | MOH | POR | POR | 25th | 40 |

=== Complete BRDC British Formula 3 Championship results ===
(key) (Races in bold indicate pole position) (Races in italics indicate fastest lap)

| Year | Team | 1 | 2 | 3 | 4 | 5 | 6 | 7 | 8 | 9 | 10 | 11 | 12 | 13 | 14 | 15 | 16 | 17 | 18 | 19 | 20 | 21 | 22 | 23 | 24 | DC | Points |
|---|---|---|---|---|---|---|---|---|---|---|---|---|---|---|---|---|---|---|---|---|---|---|---|---|---|---|---|
| 2018 | Carlin | OUL | OUL | OUL | ROC; 1 | ROC; 2 | ROC; 3 | SNE; 1 | SNE; 2 | SNE; 3 | SIL; 1 | SIL; 2 | SIL; 3 | SPA; 1; 11 | SPA; 2; 1^{7} | SPA; 3; 6 | **BRH**; **1**; 1 | BRH; 2 Ret | BRH; 3; 2 | DON; 1; 2 | DON; 2; 8^{9} | DON; 3 DSQ | SIL; 1 | SIL; 2 | SIL; 3 | 13th | 164 |

=== Complete British GT Championship results ===
(key) (Races in bold indicate pole position in class) (Races in italics indicate fastest lap in class)

| Year | Team | Car | Class | 1 | 2 | 3 | 4 | 5 | 6 | 7 | 8 | 9 | DC | Points |
|---|---|---|---|---|---|---|---|---|---|---|---|---|---|---|
| 2019 | HHC Motorsport | McLaren 570S GT4 | GT4 | OUL; 1 | OUL; 2 | SNE; 1 | SNE; 2 | SIL; 1 | DON; 1 | SPA; 1 | BRH; 1 Ret | DON; 1 | NC | 0 |
| 2020 | TF Sport | Aston Martin Vantage AMR GT4 | GT4 | OUL; 1; 16 | OUL; 2; 11 | DON; 1; 14 | DON; 2; 16 | BRH; 1; 18 | DON; 1; 17 | SNE; 1; 13 | SNE; 2; 13 | SIL; 1; 19 | 1st | 170 |
| 2021 | Toyota Gazoo Racing UK | Toyota GR Supra GT4 | GT4 | BRH; 1 | SIL; 1 | DON; 1 | SPA; 1 | SNE; 1 | SNE; 2 | OUL; 1; 18 | OUL; 2; 18 | DON; 1 NC | 15th | 5 |
| 2022 | Ram Racing | Mercedes-AMG GT3 Evo | GT3 | OUL; 1; 10 | OUL; 2 Ret | SIL; 1; 14 | DON; 1 | SNE; 1 | SNE; 2 | SPA; 1 | BRH; 1 | DON; 1 | 30th | 2.5 |

^{†} Driver did not finish, but was classified as he completed 90% race distance.

=== Complete GT4 European Series Results ===
(key) (Races in bold indicate pole position in class) (Races in italics indicate fastest lap in class)

| Year | Team | Car | Class | 1 | 2 | 3 | 4 | 5 | 6 | 7 | 8 | 9 | 10 | 11 | 12 | DC | Points |
|---|---|---|---|---|---|---|---|---|---|---|---|---|---|---|---|---|---|
| 2021 | Trivellato Racing By Villorba Corse | Mercedes-AMG GT4 | GT4 | MZA; 1 Ret | MZA; 2 | LEC; 1 | LEC; 2 | ZAN; 1 | ZAN; 2 | SPA; 1 | SPA; 2 | NUR; 1 | NUR; 2 | CAT; 1 | CAT; 2 | NC | 0 |

^{†} Driver did not finish, but was classified as he completed 90% race distance.

Sporting positions
| Preceded by James Kellett | Ginetta Junior Winter Series champion 2014 | Succeeded by Stuart Middleton |
| Preceded by Jack Mitchell | Ginetta Junior Championship champion 2015 | Succeeded by Will Tregurtha |
| Preceded by Max Fewtrell | F4 British Championship champion 2017 | Succeeded by Kiern Jewiss |
| Preceded by Ash Hand; Tom Canning | British GT Championship; GT4 Champion; 2020; With: Daniel Vaughan | Succeeded by Will Burns; Gus Burton |
| Preceded by Ash Hand; Tom Canning | British GT Championship; GT4 Silver Champion; 2020; With: Daniel Vaughan | Succeeded by Will Burns; Gus Burton |
