= Channel 4 F1 =

British Formula One racing TV programme

- Also known as: C4F1, F1 on Four
- Genre: Sports
- Presented by: Steve Jones Lee McKenzie Alex Jacques; Billy Monger
- Narrated by: Alex Jacques; David Coulthard; Jolyon Palmer
- Opening theme: "The Chain" by Fleetwood Mac (2016–2018); "Genesis" by Justice (2019–)
- Country of origin: United Kingdom
- Original language: English
- No. of series: 9
- No. of episodes: 170

Production
- Production location: Worldwide
- Editors: Kirstie Bennett; Tim Hampel
- Production company: Whisper

Original release
- Network: Channel 4 More4
- Release: 18 March 2016 – present

Related
- On The Marbles; Formula 1 Meets... Grand Prix; Formula For Success

Channel 4 F1, commonly abbreviated to C4F1, is a British television programme that covers Formula One motor racing. It has been aired by the British broadcaster Channel 4 since 2016.

From 2016 to 2018 half of the season's practice, qualifying sessions and races were shown live, with the other half covered with extended qualifying and race highlights. From 2019 to 2026 the programme has shown highlights of all races and live coverage of only the British Grand Prix.

The F1 program is shown on Channel 4 and available on its on-demand streaming service. Occasionally it has aired on the More4 channel, when Channel 4 showed other programming, usually due to a special event.

== History ==
=== 2016–2018 ===
On 21 December 2015, the BBC announced that it would end its deal with Formula One three years early due to budget cuts and would transfer the remaining three years to Channel 4. Channel 4 would be showing ten selected races live without advertisements and every race (even live) was to be shown as highlights. Channel 4 was the first free-to-air commercial station that ran without commercial breaks during its ten live races.

Channel 4 broadcast from 2016 to the end of the 2018 seasons after purchasing the rights shared with Sky Sports from BBC. Channel 4 also showed the race and associated events of the British Grand Prix and final race weekend. Extended highlights were shown of all remaining races a few hours after they finish, early evening for European and Asian which are shown live races, afternoon for Asian races or late night for live races and ones in the Americas. Qualifying highlights for live races were only shown if they were live races in Asia. Live race coverage was produced by Whisper Films, with North One Television to produce accompanying programmes. Channel 4's full presenting team was announced on 8 March 2016.

Channel 4 also announced that "The Chain" by Fleetwood Mac would be their title music, the song previously used by the BBC's coverage.

Frequent references to social media were made in the programme's break bumpers, usually in the form of hashtags in response to events as they unfold, driver/fan tweets, or simply the appearance of the #C4F1 hashtag.

For Practice Two of the 2016 European Grand Prix and 2016 Mexican Grand Prix, More4 had the coverage due to Channel 4 covering the Royal Ascot horse race.

For Practice One and Two of the 2017 United States Grand Prix and 2018 United States Grand Prix, More4 also had the coverage.

=== 2019 onwards ===
Beginning 2019, Sky Sports hold exclusive rights to all races excluding the British Grand Prix. In September 2018, it was announced that Channel 4 had agreed to a sub-licensing agreement with Sky, under which it broadcasts free-to-air highlights of all qualifying and races, and live coverage of the British Grand Prix. As part of the arrangement, Sky will have rights to carry full series of Channel 4 dramas on-demand, while Channel 4 also acquired free-to-air rights to the Sky drama Tin Star, it continued to be sponsored by Bose. Qualifying and race highlights for Silverstone tend to be shown late at night. With the addition of the sprint format, for these races shorter sprint qualifying highlights tend to be shown on Friday evenings after Channel 4 News except for Miami and Austin which are shown on Saturday morning and Qatar which airs after The Last Leg.

Occasionally, if race start times are brought forward, as was the case 2024 São Paulo Grand Prix and 2026 Miami Grand Prix, the late-night highlights can be brought forward, as was the case with Miami, which was moved forward from 1am to 11pm on Sunday.

On 13 March 2019, three days before the first Grand Prix of the season, it was revealed that Channel 4 will not be permitted (under their agreement with Sky) to interview drivers in the "pen", hold interviews in the pit lane or hold a grid walk, these restrictions do not apply for the British Grand Prix. Furthermore, Channel 4 must adhere to these and other restrictions in order for Sky to consider agreeing to the same arrangements in 2020.

For the 2020 season due to the COVID-19 pandemic, programmes for races 1-3 were presented from The Silverstone Experience as F1 limited the number of broadcasters on site. Clarkson, who works primarily for F1 TV served as Channel 4's paddock reporter, when they were unable to access the paddock. It also saw the introduction of a touch screen. During coverage of the Hungarian Grand Prix, it was confirmed that they would have access to the paddock for at least the British and 70th Anniversary weekends. However, despite being held at Silverstone Circuit Channel 4 were not allowed to broadcast the 70th Anniversary race live as they are only permitted by their agreement with Sky Sports to broadcast the race named British Grand Prix as was hinted at in an F1 Q+A before the 2020 season started.

The 2020 Spanish Grand Prix was presented from the McLaren Technology Centre in Woking. It was confirmed during coverage that Channel 4 F1 would be present in the paddock for the next race, the Belgian Grand Prix at Spa-Francorchamps. The Russian Grand Prix was presented off-site from Red Bull's HQ in Milton Keynes but they returned to the paddock for the Eifel Grand Prix. The Russian Grand Prix was again presented off-site from Red Bull's HQ in Milton Keynes in 2021.

It was announced at the Turkish Grand Prix that Edwards would step down following the Abu Dhabi Grand Prix, his replacement was announced a week later as Alex Jacques who joins from F1's official television channel, including for F2, F3 and Esports. He has also worked for BBC Radio 5 Live in a similar role at the occasional race. Also it was later announced that 'pen interviews' would be taken from F1TV with Lawrence Barretto joining the team as paddock reporter.

Steve Jones was absent from the 2021 Azerbaijan Grand Prix after he was unable to receive a COVID test result prior to travelling. The Azerbaijan coverage was presented by Lee McKenzie with Mark Webber, Billy Monger and Alex Jacques. Jones and Alex Jacques were absent from the 2021 Styrian Grand Prix after Billy Monger tested positive for COVID-19, therefore the coverage was presented by David Coulthard and Mark Webber with Ben Edwards briefly returning as lead commentator commentating remotely from the UK. For the 2021 Russian Grand Prix Channel 4 broadcast again off-site from Red Bull Racing HQ.

Lee McKenzie presented the 2021 United States Grand Prix coverage with Alex Jacques and Billy Monger on commentary. For the 2021 Mexico City Grand Prix the lineup consisted of Alex Jacques and Billy Monger on commentary with David Coulthard and Lawrence Barretto on site.

Channel 4 reached a one off agreement with Sky Sports F1 and Formula One Management to show the live coverage of the 2021 Abu Dhabi Grand Prix which decided the 2021 drivers' title between Lewis Hamilton and Max Verstappen. Coverage consisted of a short pre-race build-up programme co-presented by Jones and McKenzie, before switching over to the Sky Sports F1 feed approximately 30 minutes before the race began. It also had its own post race show after the race had concluded. Channel 4 did not use its own commentators for live coverage the race, instead taking the Sky Sports F1 commentary provided by David Croft and Martin Brundle. The highlights programme later that evening used the Channel 4 commentary from Alex Jacques, David Coulthard and Mark Webber.

In October 2022 it was confirmed Channel 4 would continue with highlights and live coverage of Silverstone in 2023. For the 2022 Japanese Grand Prix, coverage was presented by Jones, Barretto and Felipe Massa on site, with Coulthard, Monger and Jacques commentating remotely.

For the 2022 United States Grand Prix and 2022 Mexico City Grand Prix, coverage was presented by Lee McKenzie and David Coulthard on site with Alex Jacques and Billy Monger on commentary. For the 2022 São Paulo Grand Prix, coverage was presented off-site from Red Bull Racing HQ with commentary from Alex Jacques and Mark Webber.

For the 2023 season Channel 4 took F1's in-house F1TV commentary produced by Formula 1 at Biggin Hill. Led by Alex Jacques and F1TV's co-commentators including Jolyon Palmer and Coulthard. Alex Jacques records a custom 'handover' with Steve Jones, so for viewers there is no obvious difference from prior years. In July 2023 prior to the 2023 British Grand Prix Channel 4 confirmed they extended their contract with Sky up to and including the 2026 season. For the 2023 São Paulo Grand Prix the coverage was presented at F1 HQ at Biggin Hill with Jones, Monger and Jacques with Bravo on site in São Paulo.

For 2024 it was announced the programme will be relaunched, with new features and additional talent being connected to the show. Channel 4 and Whisper have ambitious plans for the coverage with an increased focus on sustainability. late-night highlight shows will be presented from an innovative, immersive studio location in the UK, while European races will be presented from the F1 paddock. There would be on-site presence for all races, as they would partner with other international broadcasters.

From 2024 onwards sprint qualifying highlights would be available presented by Alex Jacques on Fridays.

Jacques presented sprint qualifying for 2025 Chinese Grand Prix, alongside Coulthard and Palmer. Including the tribute to Jordan who had died the previous day.

Starting with the 2025 Miami Grand Prix, highlight shows would be presented from a new facility for all American races.

Jones and McKenzie co-presented the 2025 Abu Dhabi Grand Prix, which decided the championship between Lando Norris, Oscar Piastri and Verstappen. With a punditry line-up of Coulthard, Webber and Monger.

McKenzie presented sprint qualifying instead of Jacques for the 2026 British Grand Prix, as Channel 4 were showing it live.

Monger presented sprint qualifying for the 2026 Dutch Grand Prix instead of Bravo.

== Online ==
Channel 4's website had reports and analysis from David Coulthard and Ben Edwards. As of 2021 it no longer exists and re-directs to All 4. Between 2016 and 2021 Channel 4 used their own Twitter social @C4F1 for content, from 2022 all F1 output is shared through the C4Sport Twitter and YouTube channel.

== Sponsorship ==
For the first two years of Channel 4's coverage, the sponsor was travel site Kayak.com. They were replaced for the 2018 and 2019 seasons by audio company Bose. Coverage of the 2020, 2021 and 2022 seasons was sponsored by Bristol Street Motors and Macklin Motors. Coverage is currently sponsored by HSBC UK.

== Broadcast team ==
Appearances are confirmed as the season goes on, all announced dates are listed.

Presenters	Venues	Role	Notes
Steve Jones	Most races (since 2020); all races (2016–19)	Main presenter	2016–present
Lee McKenzie	Sporadic races	Interviewer, co and deputy presenter	2016–present
David Coulthard	Most races (since 2019); all races (2016–18)	Co-presenter, co-commentator and lead analyst	2016–present
Jolyon Palmer	Most races (2023–24); all races (2025–present)	Co-commentator	2023–present
Ruth Buscombe	Most races	Strategy analyst	2024–present
Mark Webber	Selected races	Analyst, relief lead analyst and co-commentator.	2016–present
Billy Monger	Most races	relief and Co-presenter, co-commentator and analyst	2019–present
Alex Jacques	All races	Lead commentator; relief presenter (2025–present)	2021–present
Ben Edwards	All races (2016–20); sporadic races (2021)	Lead commentator; relief lead commentator	2016–21
Damon Hill	Selected races	Analyst	2026–present
Alice Powell	Selected races	Analyst	2022–present
Lawrence Barretto	Selected races	Interviewer	2021–present
Ariana Bravo	Selected races	Relief presenter, interviewer and paddock reporter	2022–present
Claire Williams	Occasional races	Analyst	2025–present

== Former broadcast team ==
- Ben Edwards, Lead Commentator, 2016–20, 2021 Styrian Grand Prix and 2021 Austrian Grand Prix (qualifying only). Joined F1TV Live for selected 2022 races and the 2023/24 British Grand Prix, where he substituted for Jacques on F1TV. Now works for BBC 5 Live as one of the rotating lead commentators.
- Louise Goodman, Relief Presenter/Interviewer, 2016–18
- Susie Wolff, Analyst, 2016–18, (Joined F1 as F1 Academy Managing Director)
- Alain Prost, Analyst, 2016–17
- Holly Samos, Relief Presenter/Interviewer 2016–17
- Karun Chandhok, Analyst/Technical Analyst, Co-Commentator and Paddock Reporter, 2016–18. Rejoined Sky Sports F1
- Stefano Domenicali, Analyst, 2019. joined Formula One as CEO
- Murray Walker, Interviewer, Analyst and Co-Lead Commentator for British Grand Prix 2016–20. (until his death)
- Eddie Jordan, Lead analyst and Interviewer, 2016–2025 (until his death).

== Producers/editors ==
- Sunil Patel (Executive Producer) – Previously worked for BBC F1
- John Curtis (Editor) – Previously worked for Sky Sports News
- Tim Hampel (Producer)
- Richard Gort (Creative Director)
