= 2017 F4 British Championship =

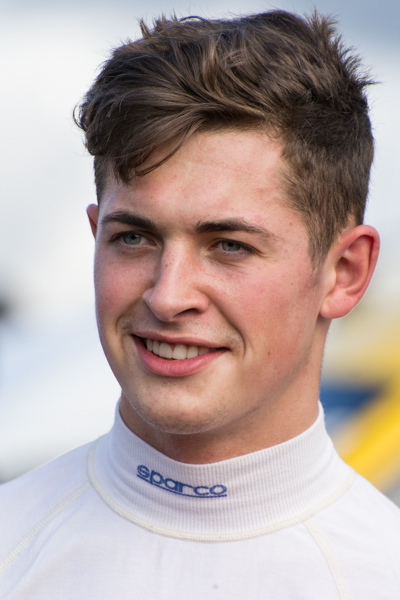
Jamie Caroline pictured at the Knockhill round. With ten victories, Caroline won the championship by 65.5 points ahead of his closest rival, Oscar Piastri.

The 2017 F4 British Championship was a multi-event, Formula 4 open-wheel single seater motor racing championship held across United Kingdom. The championship featured a mix of professional motor racing teams and privately funded drivers, competing in Formula 4 cars that conformed to the technical regulations for the championship. This, the third season, following on from the British Formula Ford Championship, was the third year that the cars conformed to the FIA's Formula 4 regulations. Part of the TOCA tour, it formed part of the extensive program of support categories built up around the BTCC centrepiece.

The season commenced on 1 April at Brands Hatch – on the circuit's Indy configuration – and concluded on 1 October at the same venue, using the Grand Prix circuit, after thirty races held at ten meetings, all in the support of the 2017 British Touring Car Championship. The championship featured Ford F4 Challenge Cup for the first time for the drivers with low budgets. The Challenge Cup Required competitors to enter 7 of the weekends of the championship, which had to include the rounds at Knockhill Racing Circuit and the finale at Brands Hatch.

The season was marred by an incident involving Billy Monger, who had both his lower legs amputated after crashing into Patrik Pasma during the third race at the Donington Park round.

== Teams and drivers ==
All teams were British-registered.

Team	No.	Drivers	Class	Rounds
Richardson Racing	2	(United Kingdom) Harry Webb	F	1–5, 7, 10
Fortec Motorsports	5	(United Kingdom) Oliver York	F	1–5
Fortec Motorsports	5	(United Kingdom) Oliver York		6–10
Fortec Motorsports	18	(Sweden) Hampus Ericsson	F	2, 5–10
Fortec Motorsports	25	(Mexico) Alexandra Mohnhaupt		6
Fortec Motorsports	33	(United Kingdom) Johnathan Hoggard		6–7, 9–10
Carlin	6	(Germany) Lucas Alecco Roy		All
Carlin	21	(Finland) Patrik Pasma		All
Carlin	31	(United States) Logan Sargeant		All
Carlin	38	(United Kingdom) Jamie Caroline		All
TRS Arden Junior Racing Team	7	(United Kingdom) Alex Quinn		All
TRS Arden Junior Racing Team	12	(United Kingdom) Ayrton Simmons		All
TRS Arden Junior Racing Team	46	(United States) Yves Baltas		1–2
TRS Arden Junior Racing Team	64	(United Kingdom) Oliver Caldwell	F	5–10
TRS Arden Junior Racing Team	81	(Australia) Oscar Piastri		All
GW Motorsport	8	(United Kingdom) Sam Smelt		6–10
GW Motorsport	91	(China) Jacky Liu		1–5, 7
Double R Racing	14	(Lebanon) Karl Massaad		All
Double R Racing	76	(Sweden) Linus Lundqvist		All
Double R Racing	92	(China) Daniel Cao		1–5
JHR Developments	20	(United Kingdom) Harry Dyson		9–10
JHR Developments	22	(Mexico) Manuel Sulaimán		1–2, 6–10
JHR Developments	23	(United Kingdom) Billy Monger	F	1–2
Falcon Motorsport	29	(Republic of Ireland) Lucca Allen	F	6–10
Sharp Motorsport	89	(United Kingdom) Jamie Sharp		All

Icon	Class
F	Ford F4 Challenge Cup

== Race calendar and results ==
The calendar was announced on 16 June 2016.

Round		Circuit	Date	Pole position	Fastest lap	Winning driver	Winning team	Challenge Cup winner
1	R1	Brands Hatch (Indy Circuit, Kent)	1 April	(United Kingdom) Jamie Caroline	(United Kingdom) Alex Quinn	(United Kingdom) Jamie Caroline	Carlin	(United Kingdom) Billy Monger
1	R2	Brands Hatch (Indy Circuit, Kent)	2 April		(Finland) Patrik Pasma	(United Kingdom) Ayrton Simmons	TRS Arden Junior Racing Team	(United Kingdom) Billy Monger
1	R3	Brands Hatch (Indy Circuit, Kent)	2 April	(United Kingdom) Jamie Caroline	(United Kingdom) Alex Quinn	(United Kingdom) Jamie Caroline	Carlin	(United Kingdom) Billy Monger
2	R4	Donington Park (National Circuit, Leicestershire)	15 April	(Sweden) Linus Lundqvist	(United Kingdom) Jamie Caroline	(United Kingdom) Jamie Caroline	Carlin	(United Kingdom) Billy Monger
2	R5	Donington Park (National Circuit, Leicestershire)	15 April		(United States) Logan Sargeant	(United Kingdom) Jamie Caroline	Carlin	(United Kingdom) Oliver York
2	R6	Donington Park (National Circuit, Leicestershire)	16 April	(Sweden) Linus Lundqvist	(Australia) Oscar Piastri	(Sweden) Linus Lundqvist	Double R Racing	(United Kingdom) Oliver York
3	R7	Thruxton Circuit (Hampshire)	6 May	(United Kingdom) Oliver York	(Sweden) Linus Lundqvist	(United Kingdom) Jamie Caroline	Carlin	(United Kingdom) Oliver York
3	R8	Thruxton Circuit (Hampshire)	7 May		(Sweden) Linus Lundqvist	(United Kingdom) Jamie Caroline	Carlin	(United Kingdom) Oliver York
3	R9	Thruxton Circuit (Hampshire)	7 May	(United Kingdom) Alex Quinn	(United Kingdom) Jamie Caroline	(United Kingdom) Jamie Caroline	Carlin	(United Kingdom) Oliver York
4	R10	Oulton Park (Island Circuit, Cheshire)	20 May	(United Kingdom) Jamie Caroline	(Sweden) Linus Lundqvist	(United Kingdom) Jamie Caroline	Carlin	(United Kingdom) Harry Webb
4	R11	Oulton Park (Island Circuit, Cheshire)	21 May		(United Kingdom) Alex Quinn	(Australia) Oscar Piastri	TRS Arden Junior Racing Team	(United Kingdom) Harry Webb
4	R12	Oulton Park (Island Circuit, Cheshire)	21 May	Race postponed to Knockhill due to barrier damage				
5	R13	Croft Circuit (North Yorkshire)	10 June	(Sweden) Linus Lundqvist	(Sweden) Linus Lundqvist	(Sweden) Linus Lundqvist	Double R Racing	(United Kingdom) Harry Webb
5	R14	Croft Circuit (North Yorkshire)	11 June		(United Kingdom) Alex Quinn	(United Kingdom) Alex Quinn	TRS Arden Junior Racing Team	(United Kingdom) Oliver York
5	R15	Croft Circuit (North Yorkshire)	11 June	(Sweden) Linus Lundqvist	(Sweden) Linus Lundqvist	(Sweden) Linus Lundqvist	Double R Racing	(United Kingdom) Oliver York
6	R16	Snetterton Motor Racing Circuit (300 Circuit, Norfolk)	29 July	(Australia) Oscar Piastri	(Australia) Oscar Piastri	(Australia) Oscar Piastri	TRS Arden Junior Racing Team	(United Kingdom) Olli Caldwell
6	R17	Snetterton Motor Racing Circuit (300 Circuit, Norfolk)	29 July		(United Kingdom) Jamie Caroline	(United Kingdom) Jamie Caroline	Carlin	(United Kingdom) Olli Caldwell
6	R18	Snetterton Motor Racing Circuit (300 Circuit, Norfolk)	30 July	(Australia) Oscar Piastri	(Sweden) Linus Lundqvist	(Australia) Oscar Piastri	TRS Arden Junior Racing Team	(Sweden) Hampus Ericsson
7	R19	Knockhill Racing Circuit (Fife)	12 August	(Australia) Oscar Piastri	(United Kingdom) Jamie Caroline	(Australia) Oscar Piastri	TRS Arden Junior Racing Team	(Sweden) Hampus Ericsson
4	R12	Knockhill Racing Circuit (Fife)	12 August	(United Kingdom) Jamie Caroline	(United Kingdom) Jamie Caroline	(United Kingdom) Jamie Caroline	Carlin	(United Kingdom) Oliver York
7	R20	Knockhill Racing Circuit (Fife)	13 August		(United States) Logan Sargeant	(United Kingdom) Oliver York	Fortec Motorsports	(Sweden) Hampus Ericsson
7	R21	Knockhill Racing Circuit (Fife)	13 August	(Australia) Oscar Piastri	(Australia) Oscar Piastri	(Australia) Oscar Piastri	TRS Arden Junior Racing Team	(United Kingdom) Harry Webb
8	R22	Rockingham Motor Speedway (International Super Sports Car Circuit, Northamptonshire)	26 August	(Sweden) Linus Lundqvist	(Sweden) Linus Lundqvist	(Sweden) Linus Lundqvist	Double R Racing	(Sweden) Hampus Ericsson
8	R23	Rockingham Motor Speedway (International Super Sports Car Circuit, Northamptonshire)	27 August		(Australia) Oscar Piastri	(United Kingdom) Alex Quinn	TRS Arden Junior Racing Team	(Sweden) Hampus Ericsson
8	R24	Rockingham Motor Speedway (International Super Sports Car Circuit, Northamptonshire)	27 August	(United States) Logan Sargeant	(United Kingdom) Jamie Caroline	(United States) Logan Sargeant	Carlin	(Sweden) Hampus Ericsson
9	R25	Silverstone Circuit (National Circuit, Northamptonshire)	16 September	(Australia) Oscar Piastri	(United Kingdom) Ayrton Simmons	(United Kingdom) Alex Quinn	TRS Arden Junior Racing Team	(Sweden) Hampus Ericsson
9	R26	Silverstone Circuit (National Circuit, Northamptonshire)	17 September		(United Kingdom) Ayrton Simmons	(United States) Logan Sargeant	Carlin	(Sweden) Hampus Ericsson
9	R27	Silverstone Circuit (National Circuit, Northamptonshire)	17 September	(Australia) Oscar Piastri	(Australia) Oscar Piastri	(Australia) Oscar Piastri	TRS Arden Junior Racing Team	(United Kingdom) Olli Caldwell
10	R28	Brands Hatch (Grand Prix Circuit, Kent)	30 September	(United States) Logan Sargeant	(Sweden) Linus Lundqvist	(Sweden) Linus Lundqvist	Double R Racing	(United Kingdom) Olli Caldwell
10	R29	Brands Hatch (Grand Prix Circuit, Kent)	30 September		(Finland) Patrik Pasma	(United Kingdom) Oliver York	Fortec Motorsports	(United Kingdom) Olli Caldwell
10	R30	Brands Hatch (Grand Prix Circuit, Kent)	1 October	(United Kingdom) Alex Quinn	(Sweden) Linus Lundqvist	(United Kingdom) Alex Quinn	TRS Arden Junior Racing Team	(Sweden) Hampus Ericsson

== Championship standings ==
Points were awarded as follows:

Position	1st	2nd	3rd	4th	5th	6th	7th	8th	9th	10th
Points	25	18	15	12	10	8	6	4	2	1

=== Drivers' standings ===
Pos	Driver	BHI			DON^{†}			THR			OUL ^{†} ^{‡}			CRO			SNE			KNO ^{‡}				ROC			SIL			BHGP			Pts
1	(United Kingdom) Jamie Caroline	1	5	1	1	1	15	1	1	1	1	Ret	C	4	7	5	8	1	7	2	1	6	5	3	Ret	3	4	2	2	8	2	6	442
2	(Australia) Oscar Piastri	3	6	2	5	5	2	7	3	6	6	1	C	2	2	3	1	7	1	1	6	8	1	Ret	10	Ret	3	3	1	4	5	5	376.5
3	(United States) Logan Sargeant	4	4	6	10	13	4	6	4	2	5	2	C	3	3	6	4	4	2	5	2	2	4	4	4	1	7	1	4	2	4	Ret	356
4	(United Kingdom) Alex Quinn	2	7	3	Ret	DNS	9	2	6	11	2	8	C	5	1	2	5	3	5	4	Ret	4	2	6	1	7	1	11	Ret	Ret	9	1	307
5	(Sweden) Linus Lundqvist	Ret	Ret	Ret	2	Ret	1	5	2	4	3	5	C	1	4	1	3	5	3	8	Ret	Ret	6	1	Ret	5	6	9	5	1	8	2	306.5
6	(United Kingdom) Oliver York	9	8	8	4	2	3	4	8	3	10	7	C	9	5	8	6	2	17	6	4	1	11	2	5	2	2	7	Ret	5	1	7	274.5
7	(United Kingdom) Ayrton Simmons	7	1	5	11	6	10	8	5	12	Ret	6	C	6	Ret	7	2	6	4	3	5	5	3	5	3	4	5	5	6	3	6	Ret	257.5
8	(Finland) Patrik Pasma	5	2	4	6	3	Ret	13	7	7	4	3	C	8	6	9	11	9	12	Ret	Ret	10	7	7	2	10	10	8	Ret	6	16	4	167.5
9	(Lebanon) Karl Massaad	10	11	11	Ret	8	14	3	Ret	5	8	Ret	C	Ret	Ret	4	10	Ret	Ret	12	3	9	16	9	12	Ret	11	6	7	10	10	10	83
10	(Sweden) Hampus Ericsson				9	10	11							11	9	11	12	EX	6	7		3	10	10	6	6	9	4	15	12	13	3	69
11	(United Kingdom) Harry Webb	12	10	10	7	4	5	10	10	9	7	4	C	7	8	10				11	7	7	8							11	11	Ret	68
12	(United Kingdom) Billy Monger	6	3	7	3	Ret	Ret																										44
13	(Mexico) Manuel Sulaimán	8	9	9	13	12	Ret										9	12	9	EX		11	Ret	Ret	13	8	Ret	10	10	7	3	8	43
14	(United Kingdom) Olli Caldwell													DNP	10	12	7	8	8	9		13	9	12	7	Ret	17	18	8	9	7	9	39
15	(United Kingdom) Jamie Sharp	Ret	13	12	8	7	13	9	9	8	12	10	C	10	Ret	Ret	14	13	14	Ret	9	12	15	8	Ret	11	13	14	12	Ret	Ret	Ret	22.5
16	(United Kingdom) Johnathan Hoggard																17	11	10	Ret		17	17				8	Ret	3	13	14	11	20
17	(United Kingdom) Sam Smelt																18	14	11	10		14	12	11	8	9	15	16	9	Ret	15	Ret	9
18	(China) Daniel Cao	11	12	16	Ret	9	7	11	11	10	11	9	C	Ret	Ret	15																	7
19	(United States) Yves Baltas	13	Ret	13	Ret	Ret	6																										4
20	(China) Jacky Liu	Ret	15	14	12	11	12	12	12	Ret	Ret	11	C	12	11	14				14	8	16	Ret										4
21	(Germany) Lucas Alecco Roy	Ret	14	15	Ret	Ret	8	Ret	13	Ret	9	Ret	C	Ret	12	13	16	10	13	Ret	10	15	13	13	9	12	16	15	14	Ret	Ret	DNS	2
22	(Republic of Ireland) Lucca Allen																13	16	16	13		Ret	14	14	11	13	14	13	11	14	12	Ret	0
23	(United Kingdom) Harry Dyson																										12	12	13	Ret	Ret	DNS	0
24	(Mexico) Alexandra Mohnhaupt																15	15	15														0

^{†} Half points awarded in Race 3 at Donington Park and Race 2 at Oulton Park due to less than 75% of the race being completed.
^{‡} Race 3 at Oulton Park was cancelled due to barrier damage and the race was postponed to the 2nd race in Round 7 at Knockhill Racing Circuit.

=== Ford F4 Challenge Cup ===
Pos	Driver	BHI			DON ^{†}			THR			OUL ^{†} ^{‡}			CRO			SNE			KNO				ROC			SIL			BHGP			Points
1	(Sweden) Hampus Ericsson				9	10	11							11	9	11	12	EX	6	7		3	10	10	6	6	9	4	15	12	13	3	367.5
2	(United Kingdom) Harry Webb	12	10	10	7	4	5	10	10	9	7	4	C	7	8	10				11	7	7	8							11	11	Ret	351.5
3	(United Kingdom) Oliver York	9	8	8	4	2	3	4	8	3	10	7	C	9	5	8					4												304.5
4	(United Kingdom) Olli Caldwell													DNP	10	12	7	8	8	9		13	9	12	7	Ret	17	17	8	9	7	9	302
5	(Republic of Ireland) Lucca Allen																13	16	16	13		Ret	14	14	11	13	14	13	11	14	12	Ret	201
6	(United Kingdom) Billy Monger	6	3	7	3	Ret	Ret																										100

^{†} Half points awarded in Race 3 at Donington Park and Race 2 at Oulton Park due to less than 75% of the race being completed.
^{‡} Race 3 at Oulton Park was cancelled due to barrier damage and the race was postponed to Round 7 at Knockhill Racing Circuit.

=== Teams Cup ===
Each team nominated two drivers to score points before every round. All non-nominated drivers were ignored.

Pos	Team	Pts
1	Carlin	869.5
2	TRS Arden Junior Racing Team	768.5
3	Double R Racing	458.5
4	Fortec Motorsports	430.5
5	JHR Developments	150
6	Richardson Racing	107.5
7	Sharp motorsport	62
8	GW Motorsport	54
9	Falcon Motorsport	18
