= Jack Mitchell (racing driver) =

British racing driver (born 1998)

- Nationality: (United Kingdom) British
- Born: 7 April 1998 (age 28) Kent, United Kingdom

British GT Championship career
- Debut season: 2016
- Current team: Toro Verde GT
- Categorisation: FIA Silver
- Years active: 2016-2020, 2022, 2025-2026
- Car number: 42
- Former teams: Aston Martin Racing, Century Motorsport, 2 Seas Motorsport, Toyota Gazoo Racing UK, Mahiki Racing
- Starts: 62
- Wins: 3
- Poles: 9
- Fastest laps: 0

Previous series
- 2021 2016-2017 2015 2013-2014: British Touring Car Championship; Ginetta GT4 Supercup; Renault Clio Cup UK; Ginetta Junior Championship

Championship titles
- 2018 2014: British GT Championship; Ginetta Junior Championship

Jack Mitchell (born 7 April 1998 in Kent) is a British racing driver who competes in the British GT Championship for Toro Verde GT driving a Ginetta G56 GT4 Evo. He won the GT4 class of the 2018 British GT Championship. He made his debut in the British Touring Car Championship for Team HARD in 2021.

Before returning to the British GT, Mitchell has raced in the Ginetta Junior Championship where he was the 2014 champion, Renault Clio Cup UK, Ginetta GT4 Supercup and the British Touring Car Championship.

== Racing record ==
=== Complete Ginetta Junior Championship results ===
(key) (Races in bold indicate pole position) (Races in italics indicate fastest lap)

Year	Team	1	2	3	4	5	6	7	8	9	10	11	12	13	14	15	16	17	18	19	20	DC	Points
2013	Privateer	BHI; 1; 10	BHI; 2; 8	DON; 1; 4	DON; 2 Ret	THR; 1; 6	THR; 2; 11	OUL; 1; 3	OUL; 2; 5	CRO; 1; 4	CRO; 2; 4	SNE; 1; 5	SNE; 2; 1	KNO; 1; 8	KNO; 2; 6	ROC; 1; 5	**ROC**; **2**; 6	SIL; 1; 3	**SIL**; **2**; 6	BHGP; 1; 6	BHGP; 2; 3	7th	334
2014	JHR Developments	**BHI**; **1**; 1	**BHI**; **2**; 1	**DON**; **1**; 1	**DON**; **2**; 1	THR; 1 Ret	**THR**; **2**; 6	**OUL**; **1**; 1	**OUL**; **2**; 1	CRO; 1; 3	CRO; 2; 2	SNE; 1; 5	SNE; 2; 4	KNO; 1; 2	KNO; 2; 5	ROC; 1; 2	ROC; 2; 7	SIL; 1; 1	SIL; 2; 4	BHGP; 1; 4	BHGP; 2 Ret	1st	513

=== Complete British GT Championship results ===
(key) (Races in bold indicate pole position) (Races in italics indicate fastest lap)

Year	Team	Car	Class	1	2	3	4	5	6	7	8	9	10	DC	Points
2016	Generation AMR Macmillan Racing	Aston Martin V8 Vantage GT4	GT4	BRH; 1 Ret	ROC; 1; 17	OUL; 1; 16	OUL; 2; 19	SIL; 1; 28	SPA; 1; 16	SNE; 1; 14	SNE; 2 Ret	DON; 1; 10		5th	100.5
2017	Macmillan AMR	Aston Martin V12 Vantage GT3	GT3	OUL; 1 Ret	OUL; 2; 6	ROC; 1; 3	**SNE**; **1**; 3	SNE; 2; 5	**SIL**; **1**; 2	SPA; 1; 10	SPA; 2; 3	BRH; 1; 10	DON; 1	6th	100
2018	Century Motorsport	BMW M4 GT4	GT4	OUL; 1; 16	OUL; 2; 15	ROC; 1; 21	SNE; 1; 20	SNE; 2; 18	SIL; 1; 14	SPA; 1; 11	**BRH**; **1**; 14	DON; 1; 20		1st	124
2019	Century Motorsport	BMW M6 GT3	GT3	OUL; 1; 6	OUL; 2; 9	**SNE**; **1**; 11	SNE; 2; 9	SIL; 1 DNS	DON; 1; 13	SPA; 1; 11	BRH; 1; 3	DON; 1; 3		10th	59
2020	2 Seas Motorsport	McLaren 720S GT3	GT3	OUL; 1; 12	OUL; 2; 4	DON; 1; 7	DON; 2; 3	BRH; 1; 8	DON; 1; 4	SNE; 1; 1	SNE; 2; 8	SIL; 1; 12		7th	90.5
2022	Toyota Gazoo Racing UK	Toyota GR Supra GT4	GT4	OUL; 1; 23	OUL; 2; 17	SIL; 1	DON; 1	SNE; 1	SNE; 2	SPA; 1	BRH; 1	DON; 1		18th	16
2025	Mahiki Racing	Lotus Emira GT4	GT4	DON; 1 Ret	SIL; 1 Ret	OUL; 1; 15	OUL; 2; 15							7th	70
2025	Mahiki Racing	Ginetta G56 GT4 Evo	GT4					**SPA**; **1**; 17	SNE; 1; 15	**SNE**; **2**; 17	**BRH**; **1** Ret	DON; 1		7th	70
2026	Toro Verde GT	Ginetta G56 GT4 Evo	GT4	SIL; 1; 18	OUL; 1; 18	**OUL**; **2** Ret	SPA; 1; 15	SNE; 1; 17	**SNE**; **2** Ret	DON; 1; 20	BRH; 1; 14			8th	75

=== Complete British Touring Car Championship results ===
(key) (Races in bold indicate pole position – 1 point awarded just in first race) (Races in italics indicate fastest lap – 1 point awarded all races) (* signifies that driver lead race for at least one lap – 1 point given all races)

Year	Team	Car	1	2	3	4	5	6	7	8	9	10	11	12	13	14	15	16	17	18	19	20	21	22	23	24	25	26	27	28	29	30	Pos	Points
2021	Team HARD with Autobrite Direct	Cupra León	THR; 1	THR; 2	THR; 3	SNE; 1	SNE; 2	SNE; 3	BRH; 1	BRH; 2	BRH; 3	OUL; 1; 22	OUL; 2; 22	OUL; 3 Ret	KNO; 1; 22	KNO; 2; 21	KNO; 3; 22	THR; 1; 23	THR; 2 Ret	THR; 3; 21	CRO; 1; 22	CRO; 2; 20	CRO; 3 Ret	SIL; 1 Ret	SIL; 2; 22	SIL; 3 Ret	DON; 1; 24	DON; 2; 19	DON; 3; 21	BRH; 1; 21	BRH; 2; 17	BRH; 3 Ret	28th	0

Sporting positions
Preceded by Harry Woodhead	Ginetta Junior Championship; Champion; 2014	Succeeded by Jamie Caroline
Preceded by Stuart Middleton; William Tregurtha	British GT Championship; GT4 Champion; 2018	Succeeded by Ash Hand; Tom Canning
Preceded by Stuart Middleton; William Tregurtha	British GT Championship; GT4 Silver Champion; 2018	Succeeded by Ash Hand; Tom Canning
