= Billy Monger =

British racing driver (born 1999)

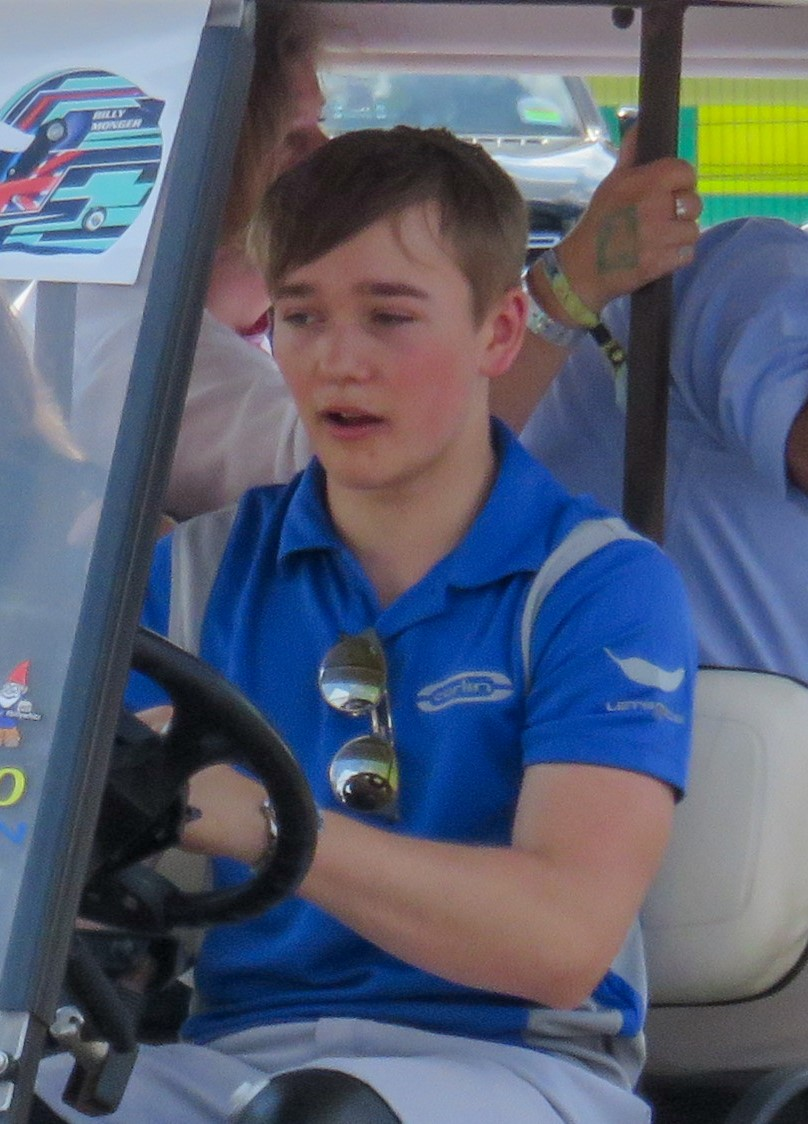
- Monger in 2018
- Nationality: (United Kingdom) British
- Born: Billy Edmund Albert Monger; 5 May 1999 (age 27) Charlwood, Surrey, England

Euroformula Open Championship career
- Debut season: 2019
- Current team: Carlin
- Car number: 31
- Starts: 20 (20 entries)
- Wins: 1
- Podiums: 2
- Poles: 1
- Fastest laps: 0
- Best finish: 9th in 2019

Previous series
- 2018 2016–2017 2017: BRDC Formula 3 F4 British Championship; Ginetta Junior Championship

Billy Edmund Albert Monger (born 5 May 1999) is a British former racing driver who raced in British F4 in 2016 and 2017. He now works as a commentator and pundit. He has been referred to by the nickname Billy Whizz, after the character in British comic anthology The Beano.

In April 2017, Monger was critically injured in a collision at Donington Park that caused both of his legs to be amputated, one below and the other above the knee. Up to that point, he had been heavily involved in kart racing all over the UK and the Channel Islands, as well as a successful Ginetta Junior racer before moving into single-seater categories.

After treatment and therapy, Monger returned to competition in November 2017. In 2018, he was awarded the BBC Sports Personality of the Year Helen Rollason Award for outstanding achievement in the face of adversity. From 2019, he provided analysis for Channel 4 F1. He also competed in the Formula 3 based Euroformula Open championship for Carlin Motorsport, achieving his first single-seater race win at the 2019 Pau Grand Prix.

== Racing career ==
Monger first got behind the wheel of a vehicle at the age of six, when his father, a former kart racer, bought him his first go-kart.

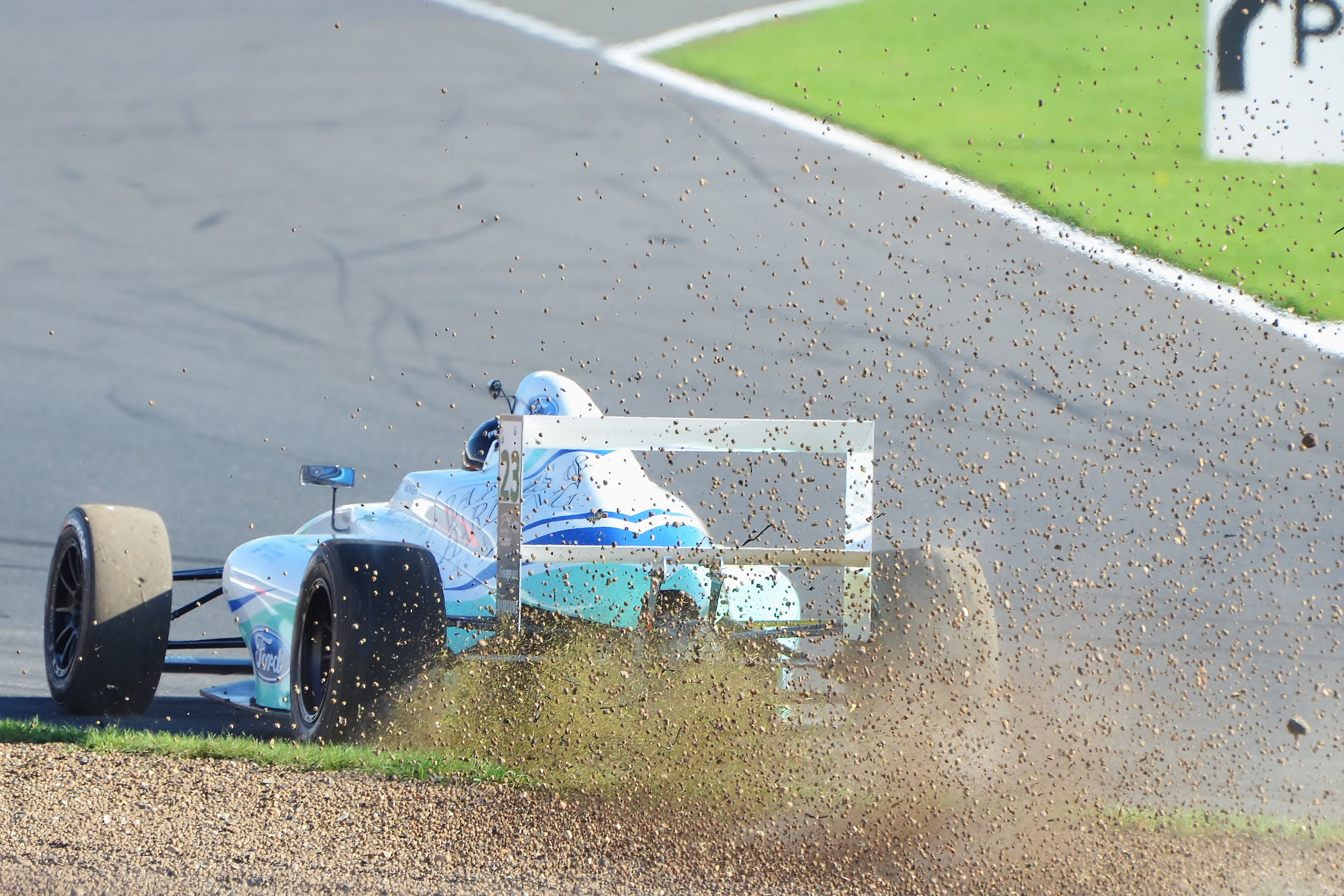
Monger racing at Silverstone with JHR Developments, as part of the 2016 British Formula 4 Championship.

In 2016, Monger joined the F4 British Championship with JHR Developments. There he took three podiums and finished 12th in the championship. He remained with the team for the 2017 season.

On 16 April 2017, Monger was severely injured during a race at Donington Park, when he crashed at high speed into the back of Finnish driver Patrik Pasma; as a result, both of his legs were amputated afterwards. His left leg was amputated high above the knee, leaving him with a short stump of his thigh. His right leg is longer, being amputated below the knee, and the extra length and use of the joint enables him to drive modified cars. Monger was conscious after the car crash. Pasma was not seriously injured in the crash.

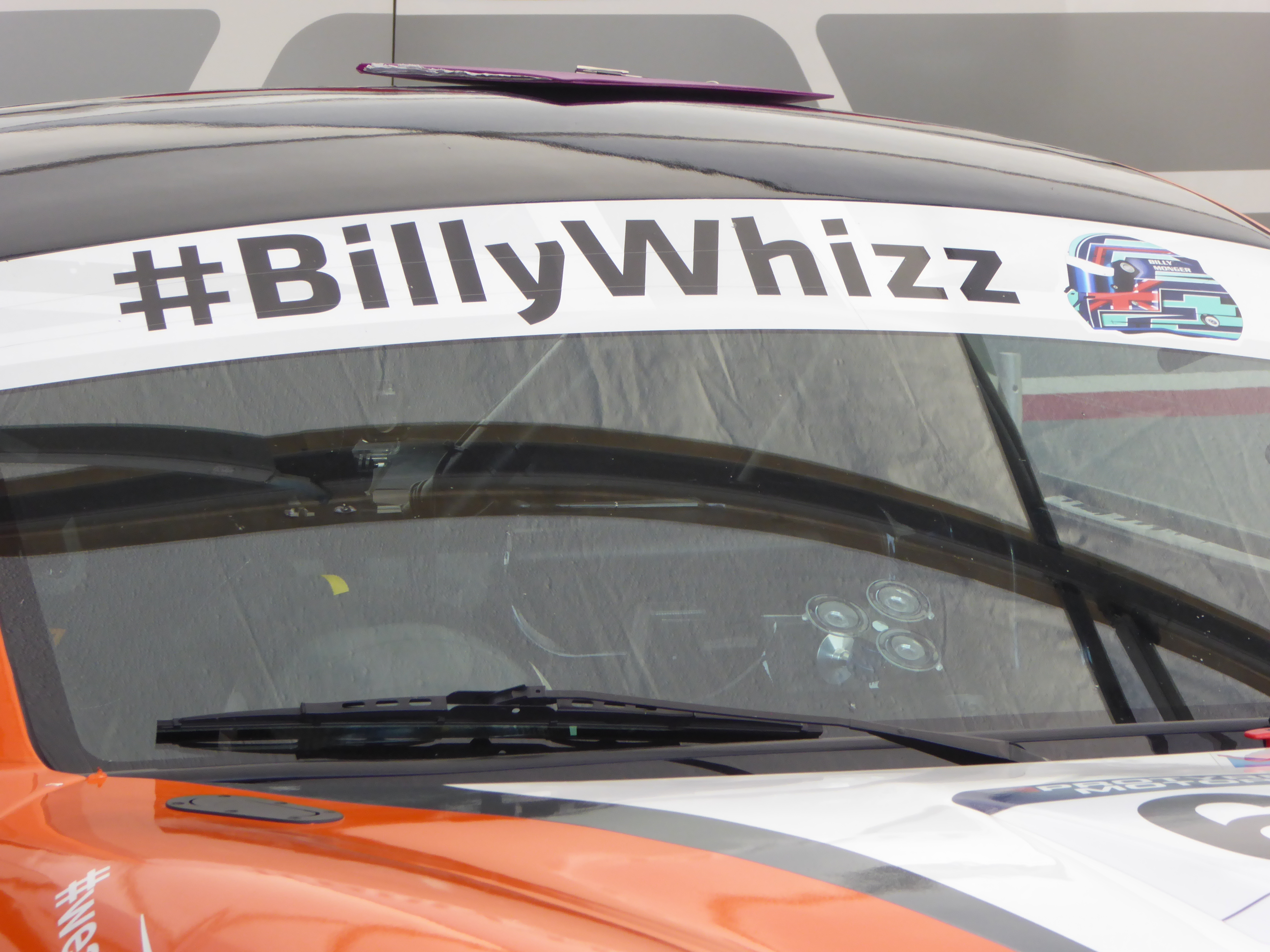
After his Donington Park crash, stickers in support of Monger – such as this one on Geri Nicosia's Ginetta GT5 Challenge car at Knockhill in Scotland – were placed on cars on the entire British Touring Car Championship package.

A JustGiving page was set up by Monger's team JHR Developments to raise money for him, raising over £500,000 in the first 24 hours. Donors included F1 drivers Jenson Button, Lewis Hamilton, Max Verstappen, Daniel Ricciardo, Jolyon Palmer and Nico Hülkenberg.

In June 2017, Monger announced that he would return to competition in November, sharing a Group CN Ligier JS53 Evo 2-Honda with quadruple amputee Frédéric Sausset in a round of the V de V Challenge Endurance Proto at the Autódromo do Estoril in Portugal, as part of a programme with the eventual aim of fielding a team of three disabled drivers at the 2020 Le Mans 24 Hours. In July 2017, Monger made his return to the track when he tested a Fun Cup race car adapted with additional hand controls by disabled motorsport specialists Team BRIT at Brands Hatch, where he regained his race licence.

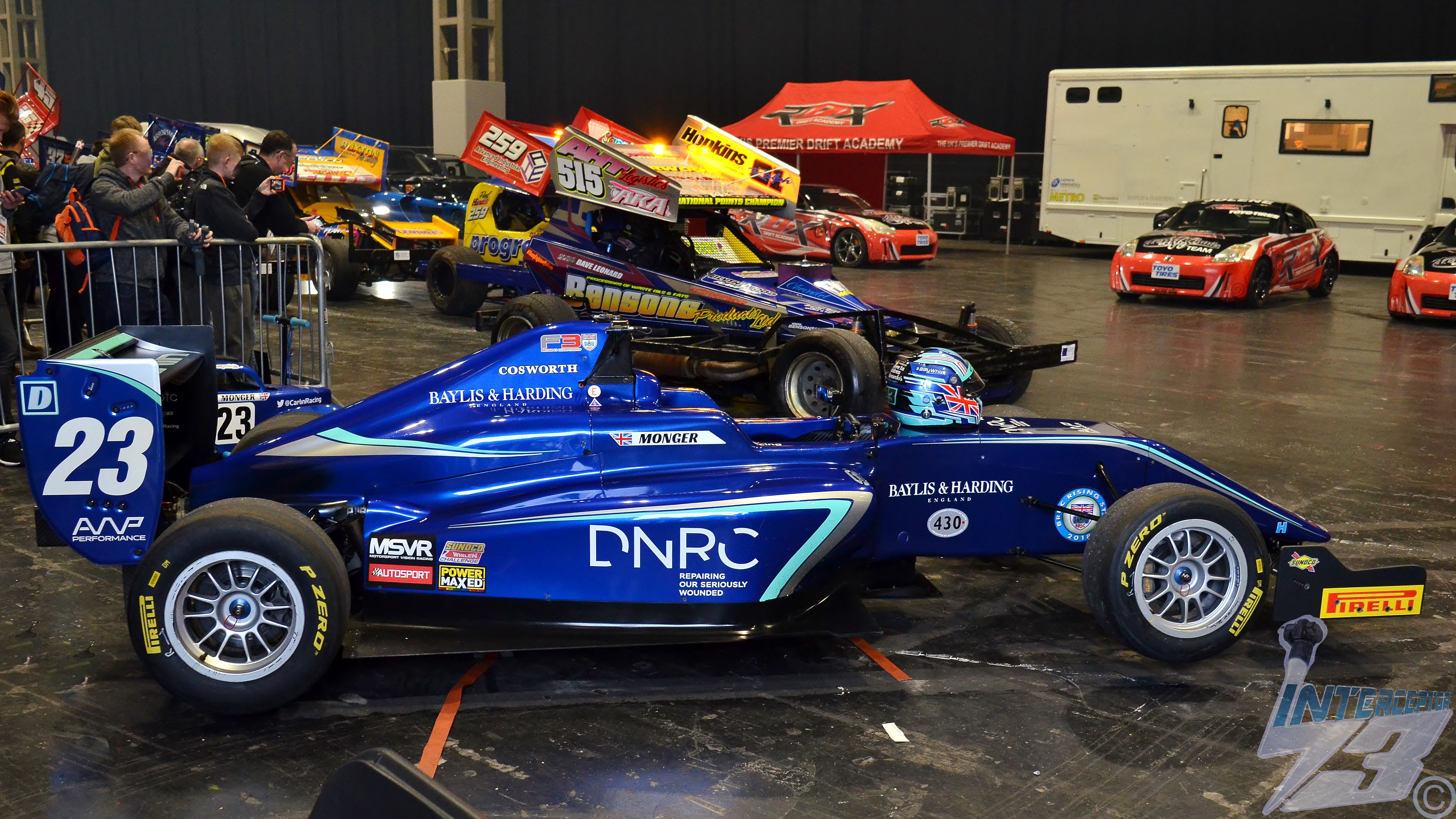
Monger's Carlin Tatuus-Cosworth MSV 016 which he raced in the 2018 BRDC British Formula 3 Championship, upon his return to motorsports.

In February 2018, Monger drove a single seater racing car for the first time since his crash when he tested a BRDC British Formula 3 car for the Carlin racing at Oulton Park. The following month, he announced that he would be racing for Carlin in the opening meeting of the 2018 BRDC Formula 3 series at the same venue. In order to compete in F3, he and his family had to appeal to the sport's international governing body, the Fédération Internationale de l'Automobile, to change their regulations, as they had restricted disabled drivers from racing single seaters on the grounds of safety. The FIA decided to lift the ban in December 2017, allowing disabled drivers to race modified single seaters as long as they could pass safety checks. He finished third at Oulton Park in a car adapted for him: the modifications included moving the brake pedal upwards so he could brake using one of his leg stumps, and replacing the throttle pedal with a lever mounted on the steering wheel.

In June 2018, Monger drove a Formula 1 racing car for the first time when he tested a Sauber C30 at the Rockingham Motor Speedway in Corby. The car had been specially converted to match the hand controls present in his Carlin BRDC British Formula 3 car. In March 2021, he completed "Billy's Big Challenge", covering a distance of 140 miles (230 km) by walking, kayaking and cycling, and raised over £3 million for Comic Relief.

== Los Angeles 2028 ==
Monger announced in March 2025 following his Ironman Challenge he would next target the 2028 Summer Paralympics. He said he was now in "early-stage conversations" about competing at the Los Angeles Paralympics in three years, having been inspired by his work on Channel 4's Paralympic coverage.

== Broadcasting career ==
From 2019, Monger provided analysis for Channel 4 F1. He also was the co-commentator for W Series. In addition, he has worked on Channel 4's Paralympic Games coverage and the Parasport presenting team, as commentator and reporter.

A documentary feature about Monger's first Formula 1 drive was shown as part of Sky F1's coverage of the 2018 Austrian Grand Prix. Another documentary about Monger's career, Driven: The Billy Monger Story, was produced by the BBC and released on BBC Three in November 2018. On 5 July 2021, it was announced that Monger would present Billy Monger: Changing Gear as part of coverage of the Paralympics.

Monger is signed up to be part of Channel 4's 2024 Summer Paralympics presenting team.

It was announced in September 2023 that Monger, along with his sister, Bonny, would be contestants on the first series of Celebrity Race Across the World. A family emergency caused them to leave the Race before its finish. In October 2024, Monger participated in 2024 VinFast Ironman World Championship triathlon in Kona to raise money for Comic Relief, setting a new world record time for a double amputee of 14 hours, 23 minutes and 56 seconds; beating the previous record by more than two hours. He also became the youngest double amputee to complete an Ironman event.

For the 2026 Paralympics, it was announced Monger would present his own slot Breakfast with Billy as well as the opening and closing ceremonies.

== Education and personal life ==
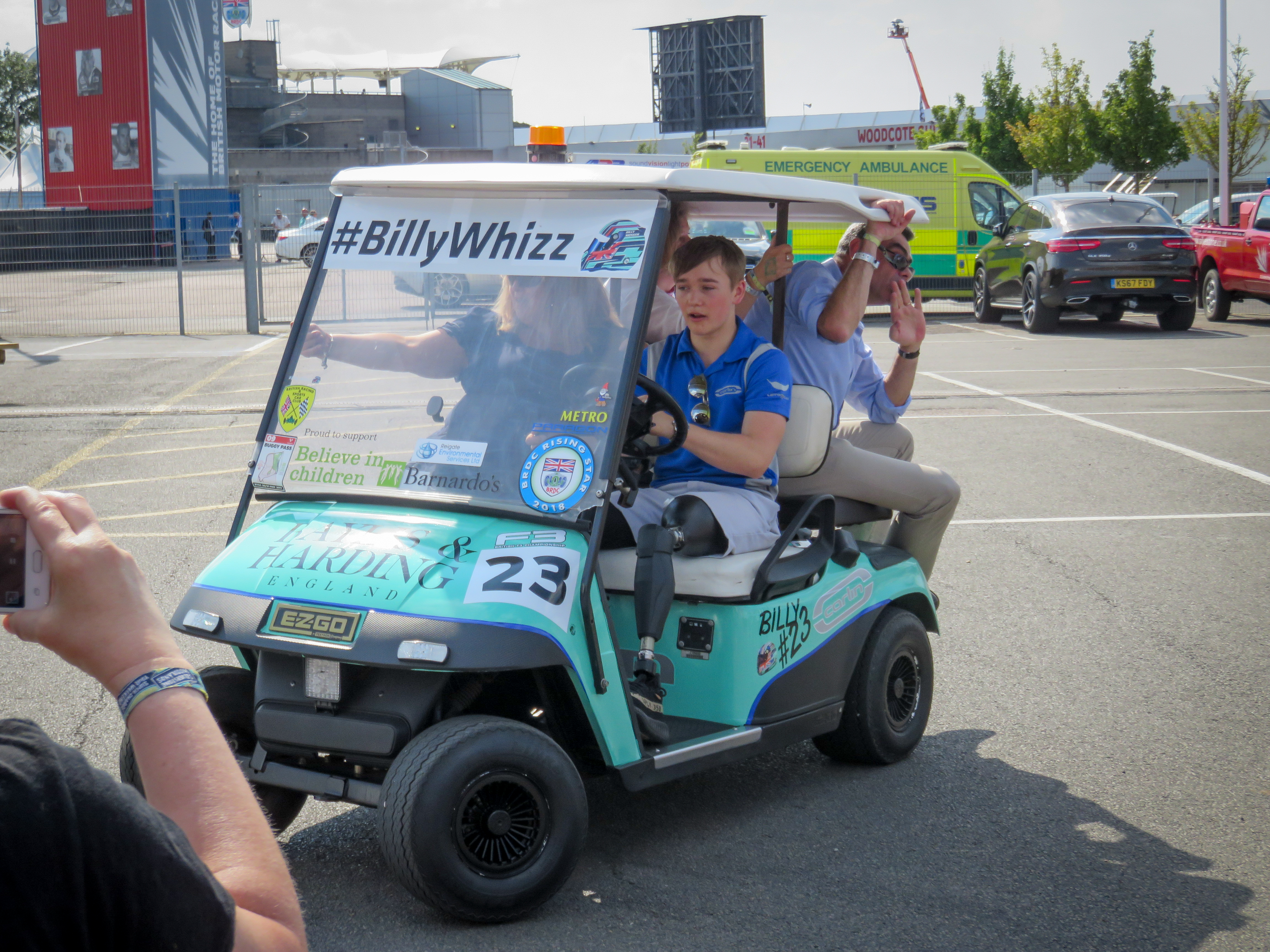
Monger driving a golf buggy with "#BillyWhizz" sticker in July 2018, over one year post-crash

Monger attended Sandcross Primary School in Reigate and The Priory School, Dorking.

Monger is a supporter of Tottenham Hotspur F.C.

In October 2024, Monger was banned from driving for 49 days after he lost control of his car and crashed into three parked vehicles and a wall in Limpsfield in January of that year.

== Karting record ==
=== Karting career summary ===
Season	Series	Team	Position
2008	British Open Championship - Honda Cadet		19th
2009	Super 1 National Championship — Honda Cadet		5th
2010	Super 1 National Championship — Honda Cadet		1st
2010	WSK Nations Cup — 60 Mini		19th
2011	Trent Valley Kart Club — Comer Cadet		36th
2011	Kartmasters British Grand Prix — Comer Cadet		6th
2011	WSK Master Series — 60 Mini	Prima Racing	NC
2011	WSK Final Cup — 60 Mini	Prima Racing	4th
2012	Super 1 National Championship — KF3		8th
2012	WSK Master Series — KF3	Forza Racing	36th
2012	CIK-FIA European Championship — KF3	Forza Racing	31st
2013	WSK Master Series — KFJ	Forza Racing	65th
2013	WSK Euro Series — KFJ	Forza Racing	45th

== Racing record ==
=== Racing career summary ===
Season	Series	Team	Races	Wins	Poles	F/Laps	Podiums	Points	Position
2014	Ginetta Junior Championship	Privateer	14	0	0	0	0	146	15th
2014	Ginetta Junior Championship	Tolbar Racing	2	0	0	0	0	146	15th
2014	Ginetta Junior Championship	Total Control Racing	4	0	0	0	0	146	15th
2015	Ginetta Junior Championship	JHR Developments	20	2	1	1	7	325	5th
2016	F4 British Championship	JHR Developments	27	0	1	0	1	78	12th
2017	F4 British Championship	JHR Developments	6	0	0	0	2	44	12th
2017	Ford F4 Challenge Cup	JHR Developments	6	4	0	1	4	100	6th
2018	BRDC British Formula 3 Championship	Carlin	23	0	2	3	4	301	6th
2019	Euroformula Open Championship	Carlin Motorsport	18	1	1	0	2	89	9th
2019	Euroformula Open Winter Series	Carlin Motorsport	2	0	0	0	0	5	10th

=== Complete Ginetta Junior Championship results ===
(key) (Races in bold indicate pole position; races in italics indicate fastest lap)

Year	Team	1	2	3	4	5	6	7	8	9	10	11	12	13	14	15	16	17	18	19	20	DC	Points
2014	Privateer	BHI; 1; 13	BHI; 2; 16	DON; 1; 14	DON; 2; 14			OUL; 1; 11	OUL; 2; 9	CRO; 1; 17	CRO; 2 Ret	SNE; 1; 10	SNE; 2; 14	KNO; 1; 9	KNO; 2; 17	ROC; 1; 10	ROC; 2; 15					15th	146
2014	Tollbar Racing					THR; 1; 13	THR; 2 Ret															15th	146
2014	Total Control Racing																	SIL; 1; 13	SIL; 2; 9	BHGP; 1; 16	BHGP; 2; 12	15th	146
2015	JHR Developments	BHI; 1; 1	**BHI**; **2**; 14	DON; 1; 3	DON; 2; 10	THR; 1; 5	THR; 2; 2	OUL; 1; 7	OUL; 2; 19	CRO; 1; 3	CRO; 2; 15	**SNE**; **1**; 2	**SNE**; **2**; 1	KNO; 1 Ret	KNO; 2; 6	ROC; 1; 9	ROC; 2; 5	SIL; 1; 22	SIL; 2; 20	BHGP; 1; 2	BHGP; 2; 17	5th	325

=== Complete F4 British Championship results ===
(key) (Races in bold indicate pole position; races in italics indicate fastest lap)

Year	Team	1	2	3	4	5	6	7	8	9	10	11	12	13	14	15	16	17	18	19	20	21	22	23	24	25	26	27	28	29	30	DC	Points
2016	JHR Developments	BHI; 1; 11	BHI; 2; 8	BHI; 3; 18	DON; 1; 9	DON; 2; 6	DON; 3; 11	THR; 1 Ret	THR; 2; 3	THR; 3; 2	OUL; 1; 9	OUL; 2; 6	OUL; 3; 13	CRO; 1	CRO; 2	CRO; 3	SNE; 1 Ret	SNE; 2; 11	SNE; 3; 12	KNO; 1 Ret	KNO; 2; 9	KNO; 3; 13	ROC; 1; 15	ROC; 2; 13	**ROC**; **3**; 3	SIL; 1 Ret	SIL; 2; 11	SIL; 3; 8	BHGP; 1 Ret	BHGP; 2; 12	BHGP; 3 Ret	12th	78
2017	JHR Developments	BRI; 1; 6	BRI; 2; 3	BRI; 3; 7	DON; 1; 3	DON; 2 Ret	DON; 3 Ret	THR; 1	THR; 2	THR; 3	OUL; 1	OUL; 2	OUL; 3	CRO; 1	CRO; 2	CRO; 3	SNE; 1	SNE; 2	SNE; 3	KNO; 1	KNO; 2	KNO; 3	ROC; 1	ROC; 2	ROC; 3	SIL; 1	SIL; 2	SIL; 3	BHGP; 1	BHGP; 2	BHGP; 3	12th	44

=== Complete BRDC British Formula 3 Championship results ===
(key) (Races in bold indicate pole position; races in italics indicate fastest lap)

Year	Team	1	2	3	4	5	6	7	8	9	10	11	12	13	14	15	16	17	18	19	20	21	22	23	24	DC	Points
2018	Carlin	OUL; 1; 3	OUL; 2; 9^{5}	OUL; 3; 8	ROC; 1; 14	ROC; 2; 7^{5}	ROC; 3 Ret	SNE; 1; 7	SNE; 2; 9^{2}	SNE; 3; 6	SIL1; 1; 8	SIL1; 2; 7^{3}	SIL1; 3; 17	SPA; 1; 6	SPA; 2; 13	SPA; 3; 3	BHI; 1; 4	BHI; 2; 13	BHI; 3; 5	**DON**; **1**; 4	DON; 2; 14^{1}	**DON**; **3**; 3	SIL2; 1; 3	SIL2; 2; 14	SIL2; 3 C	6th	301

=== Complete Euroformula Open Championship results ===
(key) (Races in bold indicate pole position) (Races in italics indicate fastest lap)

Year	Team	1	2	3	4	5	6	7	8	9	10	11	12	13	14	15	16	17	18	Pos	Points
2019	Carlin Motorsport	LEC; 1; 10	LEC; 2; 12	PAU; 1; 9	PAU; 2; 1	HOC; 1; 12	HOC; 2; 13	SPA; 1; 10	SPA; 2; 11	HUN; 1; 12	HUN; 2; 12	RBR; 1; 11	RBR; 2; 6	SIL; 1; 4	SIL; 2; 4	**CAT**; **1**; 5	CAT; 2; 3	MNZ; 1; 11	MNZ; 2; 14	9th	89

== See also ==
- Alex Zanardi, another open-cockpit open-wheel racing driver who lost both legs in a racing crash
