= 2014 Ginetta Junior Championship =

The 2014 Ginetta Junior Championship was a multi-event, one make motor racing championship held across England and Scotland. The championship featured a mix of professional motor racing teams and privately funded drivers, aged between 14 and 17, competing in Ginetta G40s that conformed to the technical regulations for the championship. It formed part of the extensive program of support categories built up around the British Touring Car Championship centrepiece. It was the eighth Ginetta Junior Championship, commencing on 30 March 2014 at Brands Hatch – on the circuit's Indy configuration – and concluded on 12 October 2014 at the same venue, utilising the Grand Prix circuit, after twenty races held at ten meetings, all in support of the 2014 British Touring Car Championship season.

Jack Mitchell claimed the championship title for JHR Developments, finishing 57 points clear of HHC Motorsport driver James Kellett, with Kellett's team-mate Lando Norris finishing a further 24 points behind, in third place. Mitchell had started the season strongly, winning the first four races and ultimately, six of the first eight races. He added one further victory during the season, at Silverstone, but his consistent finishing – top-seven finishes in all bar one race from the fifth meeting onwards – allowed him to clinch the title. Kellett and Norris finished the season with the form, as the HHC pair won 9 of the last 12 races of the season. Kellett won races at five successive meetings, while Norris took nine top-two finishes. Norris outscored Kellett by 464 to 459 on total points, however, Kellett had fewer points to drop than Norris and coupled with the latter's 21 penalty points, it was Kellett that finished runner-up. The only other drivers to win races were Dan Zelos of JHR Developments and TCR driver Jamie Caroline, who each won two races; Zelos finished fourth in the championship, while Caroline finished down in sixth place. JHR Developments also won the teams' championship, finishing 66 points clear of HHC Motorsport.

== Teams and drivers ==
Team	No.	Drivers	Rounds
R & J Motorsport	8	(United Kingdom) Ben Pearson	All
R & J Motorsport	42	(United Kingdom) Jonathan Hadfield	All
R & J Motorsport	44	(United Kingdom) Ryan Hadfield	All
HHC Motorsport	11	(United Kingdom) Lando Norris	All
HHC Motorsport	13	(United Kingdom) James Kellett	All
HHC Motorsport	21	(United Kingdom) William Taylforth	1–5
Total Control Racing	21	(United Kingdom) William Taylforth	6–7
Total Control Racing	17	(United Kingdom) Matt Chapman	All
Total Control Racing	23	(United Kingdom) Billy Monger	9–10
Total Control Racing	38	(United Kingdom) Jamie Caroline	All
JHR Developments	19	(United Kingdom) Jack Mitchell	All
JHR Developments	27	(United Kingdom) Alex Sedgwick	All
JHR Developments	45	(United Kingdom) Dan Zelos	All
JHR Developments	55	(United Kingdom) Jamie Chadwick	All
JHR Developments	66	(United Kingdom) Senna Proctor	3–10
Privateer	23	(United Kingdom) Billy Monger	1–2, 4–8
Privateer	39	(United Kingdom) Lewis Brown	1–5, 9–10
Privateer	46	(United Kingdom) Jack Rawles	1–3
Privateer	66	(United Kingdom) Senna Proctor	1–2
Privateer	25	(United Kingdom) Flashman Finneran	2–7
Tollbar Racing	25	(United Kingdom) Flashman Finneran	8–10
Tollbar Racing	23	(United Kingdom) Billy Monger	3
Tollbar Racing	33	(United Kingdom) Tom Brown	1, 4
Tollbar Racing	39	(United Kingdom) Lewis Brown	6–8
Tollbar Racing	46	(United Kingdom) Jack Rawles	4–10
Hillspeed	24	(United Kingdom) Harry Mailer	1–6, 8–10
Hillspeed	43	(Brazil) Pedro Cardoso	1–5
Hillspeed	88	(United Kingdom) Benjamin Wallace	6, 9–10
Team Dynomite	28	(United Kingdom) Tom Parker	1–3, 5
AMD Motorsport	31	(United Kingdom) Esmee Hawkey	8–10
Dansport	77	(United Kingdom) Sebastian Perez	10

== Race calendar and results ==
Round		Circuit	Date	Pole position	Fastest lap	Winning driver	Winning team
1	R1	Brands Hatch (Indy Circuit, Kent)	29 March	(United Kingdom) Jack Mitchell	(United Kingdom) Jack Mitchell	(United Kingdom) Jack Mitchell	JHR Developments
1	R2	Brands Hatch (Indy Circuit, Kent)	30 March	(United Kingdom) Jack Mitchell	(United Kingdom) Jack Mitchell	(United Kingdom) Jack Mitchell	JHR Developments
2	R3	Donington Park (National Circuit, Leicestershire)	19 April	(United Kingdom) Jack Mitchell	(United Kingdom) Jack Mitchell	(United Kingdom) Jack Mitchell	JHR Developments
2	R4	Donington Park (National Circuit, Leicestershire)	20 April	(United Kingdom) Jack Mitchell	(United Kingdom) Jamie Caroline	(United Kingdom) Jack Mitchell	JHR Developments
3	R5	Thruxton Circuit (Hampshire)	3 May	(United Kingdom) Ben Pearson	(United Kingdom) Jamie Caroline	(United Kingdom) Dan Zelos	JHR Developments
3	R6	Thruxton Circuit (Hampshire)	4 May	(United Kingdom) Jack Mitchell	(United Kingdom) James Kellett	(United Kingdom) Jamie Caroline	TCR
4	R7	Oulton Park (International Circuit, Cheshire)	8 June	(United Kingdom) Jack Mitchell	(United Kingdom) James Kellett	(United Kingdom) Jack Mitchell	JHR Developments
4	R8	Oulton Park (International Circuit, Cheshire)	8 June	(United Kingdom) Jack Mitchell	(United Kingdom) James Kellett	(United Kingdom) Jack Mitchell	JHR Developments
5	R9	Croft Circuit (North Yorkshire)	28 June	(United Kingdom) Lando Norris	(United Kingdom) Jack Mitchell	(United Kingdom) James Kellett	HHC Motorsport
5	R10	Croft Circuit (North Yorkshire)	29 June	(United Kingdom) Lando Norris	(United Kingdom) Ryan Hadfield	(United Kingdom) Lando Norris	HHC Motorsport
6	R11	Snetterton Motor Racing Circuit (300 Circuit, Norfolk)	2 August	(United Kingdom) Lando Norris	(United Kingdom) James Kellett	(United Kingdom) James Kellett	HHC Motorsport
6	R12	Snetterton Motor Racing Circuit (300 Circuit, Norfolk)	3 August	(United Kingdom) Lando Norris	(United Kingdom) Jack Mitchell	(United Kingdom) Lando Norris	HHC Motorsport
7	R13	Knockhill Racing Circuit (Fife)	23 August	(United Kingdom) Lando Norris	(United Kingdom) Lando Norris	(United Kingdom) Lando Norris	HHC Motorsport
7	R14	Knockhill Racing Circuit (Fife)	24 August	(United Kingdom) James Kellett	(United Kingdom) James Kellett	(United Kingdom) James Kellett	HHC Motorsport
8	R15	Rockingham Motor Speedway (International Super Sports Car Circuit, Northamptonshire)	6 September	(United Kingdom) Lando Norris	(United Kingdom) James Kellett	(United Kingdom) Dan Zelos	JHR Developments
8	R16	Rockingham Motor Speedway (International Super Sports Car Circuit, Northamptonshire)	7 September	(United Kingdom) James Kellett	(United Kingdom) Lando Norris	(United Kingdom) James Kellett	HHC Motorsport
9	R17	Silverstone Circuit (National Circuit, Northamptonshire)	28 September	(United Kingdom) James Kellett	(United Kingdom) Senna Proctor	(United Kingdom) Jack Mitchell	JHR Developments
9	R18	Silverstone Circuit (National Circuit, Northamptonshire)	28 September	(United Kingdom) James Kellett	(United Kingdom) Jamie Caroline	(United Kingdom) James Kellett	HHC Motorsport
10	R19	Brands Hatch (Grand Prix Circuit, Kent)	11 October	(United Kingdom) Lando Norris	(United Kingdom) Jamie Caroline	(United Kingdom) Jamie Caroline	TCR
10	R20	Brands Hatch (Grand Prix Circuit, Kent)	12 October	(United Kingdom) Lando Norris	(United Kingdom) Jamie Caroline	(United Kingdom) Lando Norris	HHC Motorsport

== Championship standings ==
=== Drivers' championship ===
A driver's best 18 scores counted towards the championship, with any other points being discarded.

Pos	Driver	BHI		DON		THR		OUL		CRO		SNE		KNO		ROC		SIL		BHGP		Total	Drop	Pen.	Points
1	(United Kingdom) Jack Mitchell	**1**	**1**	**1**	**1**	Ret	**6**	**1**	**1**	3	2	5	4	2	5	2	7	1	4	4	Ret	513			513
2	(United Kingdom) James Kellett	2	15	4	Ret	9	4	2	2	1	18	1	2	7	**1**	16	**1**	**2**	**1**	2	13	459	3		456
3	(United Kingdom) Lando Norris	6	10	2	2	Ret	10	DSQ	7	**2**	**1**	**2**	**1**	**1**	2	**7**	2	5	2	**9**	**1**	464	11	21	432
4	(United Kingdom) Dan Zelos	14	5	12	10	1	3	5	12	13	3	3	3	15	6	1	3	9	3	6	3	390	13		377
5	(United Kingdom) Ryan Hadfield	4	2	3	4	8	7	4	3	5	6	4	17	5	4	8	5	10	11	7	5	376	14	15	347
6	(United Kingdom) Jamie Caroline	8	Ret	6	3	2	1	3	DSQ	Ret	8	DSQ	5	6	13	4	4	11	5	1	2	353		33	320
7	(United Kingdom) Ben Pearson	7	3	10	5	**4**	2	8	16	9	4	8	10	8	9	6	8	6	6	8	6	324	16	6	302
8	(United Kingdom) Jamie Chadwick	3	Ret	11	Ret	3	5	7	4	4	13	7	8	Ret	3	3	6	3	Ret	10	Ret	287			287
9	(United Kingdom) Jack Rawles	9	4	9	13	5	11	Ret	6	8	9	Ret	6	13	8	5	10	Ret	7	3	4	263			263
10	(United Kingdom) Alex Sedgwick	12	Ret	8	9	14	13	12	5	6	10	6	13	4	11	9	9	7	Ret	5	8	240			240
11	(United Kingdom) Jonathan Hadfield	5	6	5	7	10	17	DSQ	11	7	7	17	Ret	11	7	13	13	4	12	13	17	220	4	12	204
12	(United Kingdom) Senna Proctor	18	13	18	17	11	9	15	8	11	5	9	7	3	14	17	Ret	Ret	8	Ret	7	186			186
13	(United Kingdom) Matt Chapman	10	9	19	Ret	7	8	10	10	10	12	11	11	14	10	11	11	15	15	14	10	185	2	9	174
14	(United Kingdom) William Taylforth	11	7	7	6	6	14	6	Ret	12	Ret	13	9	10	15							149			149
15	(United Kingdom) Billy Monger	13	16	14	14	13	Ret	11	9	17	Ret	10	14	9	17	10	15	13	9	16	12	146			146
16	(United Kingdom) Lewis Brown	15	11	16	12	17	15	Ret	17	14	14	12	Ret	12	12	12	12	8	13	15	9	143			143
17	(United Kingdom) Harry Mailer	17	14	17	15	15	18	Ret	DNS	16	15	14	15			14	14	12	14	11	11	104			104
18	(United Kingdom) Flashman Finneran			20	16	16	16	14	14	DNS	16	15	16	16	16	18	17	17	10	12	18	90			90
19	(Brazil) Pedro Cardoso	19	8	13	8	12	12	9	13	Ret	11											86		10	76
20	(United Kingdom) Tom Parker	16	17	15	11	18	NC			15	17											38			38
21	(United Kingdom) Benjamin Wallace											16	12					14	Ret	17	14	32			32
22	(United Kingdom) Esmee Hawkey															15	16	16	16	19	15	29			29
23	(United Kingdom) Tom Brown	Ret	12					13	15													23		6	17
24	(United Kingdom) Sebastian Perez																			18	16	8			8
Pos	Driver	BHI		DON		THR		OUL		CRO		SNE		KNO		ROC		SIL		BHGP		Total	Drop	Pen.	Points

Colour	Result
Gold	Winner
Silver	Second place
Bronze	Third place
Green	Points classification
Blue	Non-points classification
Blue	Non-classified finish (NC)
Purple	Retired, not classified (Ret)
Red	Did not qualify (DNQ)
Red	Did not pre-qualify (DNPQ)
Black	Disqualified (DSQ)
White	Did not start (DNS)
White	Withdrew (WD)
White	Race cancelled (C)
Blank	Did not practice (DNP)
Blank	Did not arrive (DNA)
Blank	Excluded (EX)

**Bold** – Pole
Italics – Fastest Lap
