= JHR Developments =

British motor racing team

(United Kingdom) JHR Developments
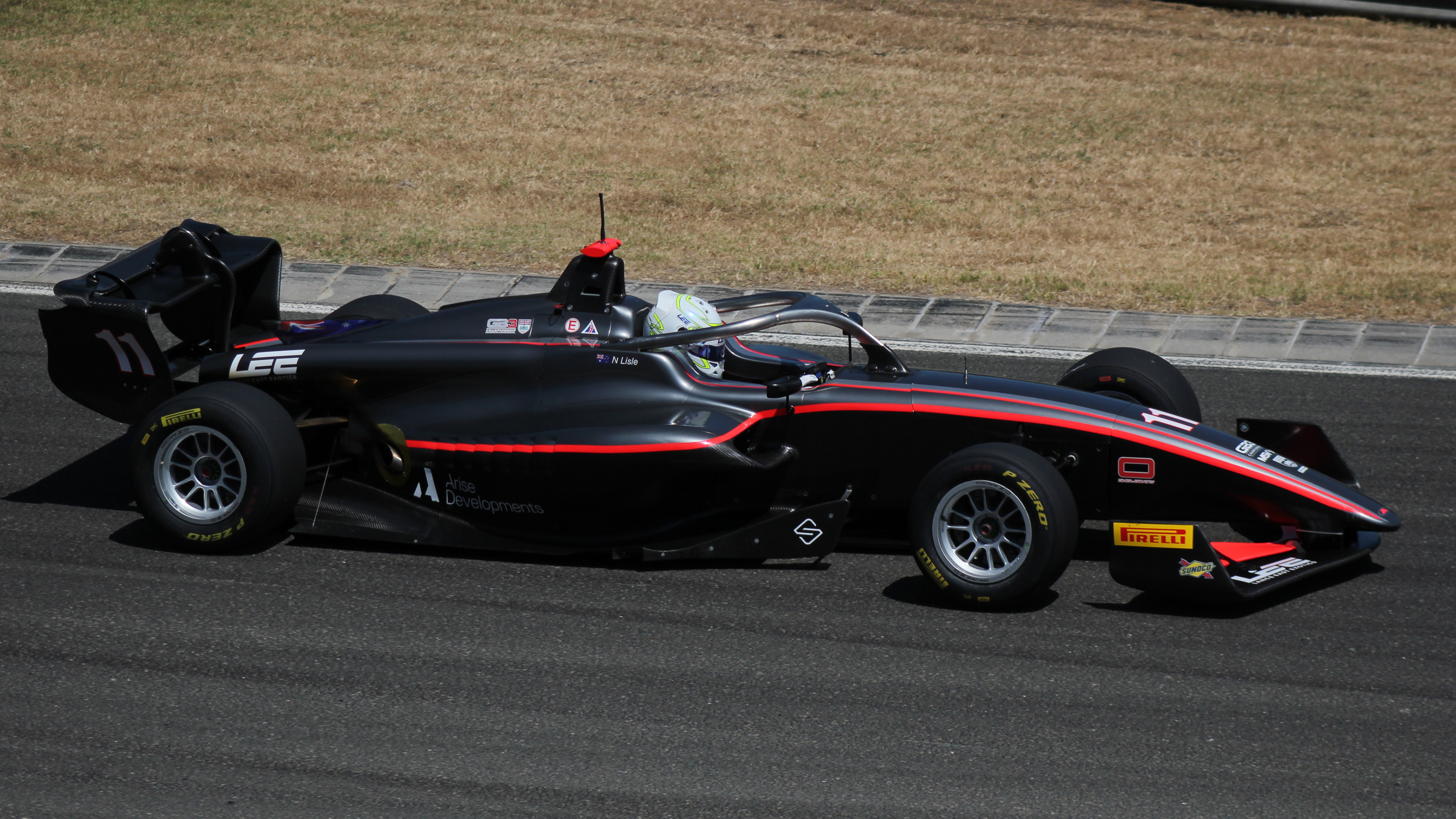
- Founded: 1995
- Base: Dronfield, Derbyshire
- Team principal(s): Steven Hunter
- Founder(s): Jamie Hunter; Fred Hunter
- Current series: GB3 Championship; F4 British Championship
- Former series: Formula 4 UAE Championship; F4 Spanish Championship; Formula Winter Series (Note: The team entered the Formula Winter Series, but withdrew before their first weekend.); Ginetta GT4 Supercup; Ginetta Junior Championship; Porsche Carrera Cup Great Britain; Renault UK Clio Cup
- Current drivers: GB3 Championship: 14. (United Kingdom) Lewis Wherrell; 15. (United Kingdom) Thomas Ingram Hill
- Noted drivers: (United Kingdom) John Bennett; (United Kingdom) Tom Ingram; (United Kingdom) Adam Smalley; (United Kingdom) Abbi Pulling; (United Kingdom) Billy Monger; (United Kingdom) Sebastian Priaulx; (United Kingdom) Tom Gamble; (United Kingdom) McKenzy Cresswell; (United Kingdom) Adam Morgan; (United Kingdom) Jamie Chadwick; (United Kingdom) Joseph Loake; (United Kingdom) Deagen Fairclough
- Teams' Championships: F4 British Championship: 2021; GB3 Championship: 2023
- Drivers' Championships: Ginetta Junior Championship: 2014: Jack Mitchell; Ginetta GT Supercup: 2013: Tom Ingram; F4 British Championship: 2021: Matthew Rees
- Website: jhrdevelopments.com

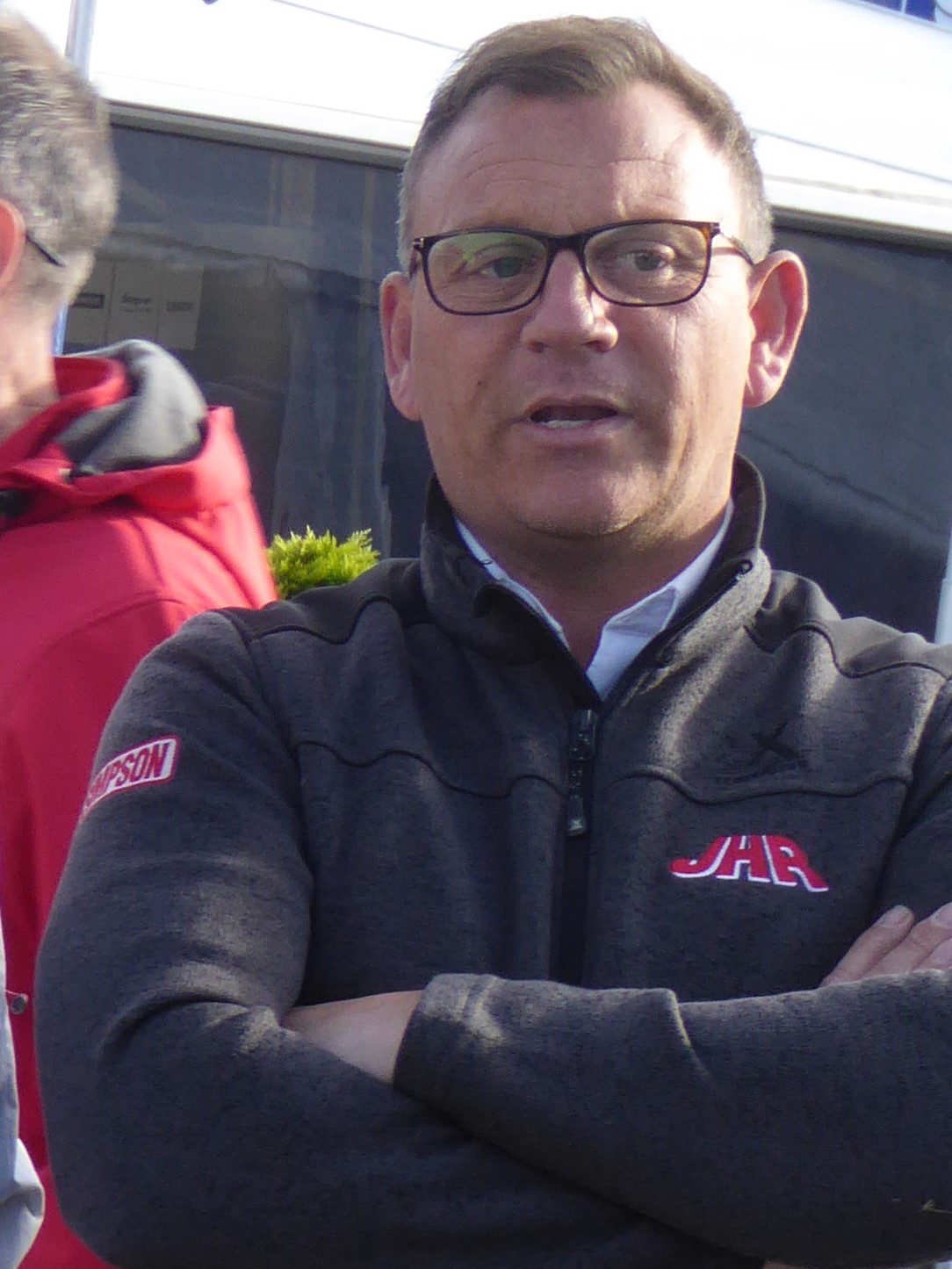
Team principal Steven Hunter at Knockhill in 2017.

JHR Developments, formerly Jamie Hunter Racing, is a British auto racing team, based in Dronfield, Derbyshire, United Kingdom. The team was founded in 1995 by Jamie Hunter and his father Fred Hunter and has competed in numerous sports car racing, one-make racing and junior formulae series since then. Its racing participation in 2026 are F4 British Championship and GB3 Championship.

== History ==
=== Early years ===
The team was founded in 1995 by Fred Hunter (1945–2008), as Jamie Hunter Racing. At the time of establishment, its purpose was to support the entry of his son, Jamie Hunter, in the Formula Renault Eurocup (then Eurocup Formula Renault) and Formula Renault 2.0 UK. Jamie Hunter (born 16 February 1972), who was the co-founder of JHR Developments, participated in the 2001 Porsche Supercup season, but he died on 3 July 2001 after a road accident. After his death, Steven Hunter, Jamie's younger brother, continued to run the team. In 2002, the team's name was shortened to JHR, standing for the team's initial name. However, another source claims this time to be the founding year. The team is also known to be formerly called JHR Racing Developments. The team's current name (JHR Developments) stand for Jamie Hunter Racing Developments and was first used at an unknown date.

In its early years, beside Formula Renault, the team also competed in sports car racing and one-make racing, including Renault Clio Cup United Kingdom, Porsche Carrera Cup Great Britain, Britcar and SEAT Cupra Championship. (Note: JHR Developments formerly stated they had entered 2001 Porsche Supercup as a two-car team. However, this entry was actually from Martin Flitton Racing, with Jamie Hunter driving for the first five rounds before his death. The team has since retracted Porsche Supercup claim from their website.) JHR also claimed to be the first team winning a race in every TOCA-supporting championship.

=== 2010–2021 ===
In May 2010, the team entered the 2010 British GT Championship for the two Knockhill races in the GTC class. Using the Jamie Hunter Racing (the original team name) banner, the team fielded a Porsche 997 GT3 Cup for Steven Hunter and Derek Pierce. As the only car competing in GTC class in this round, they finished the first race eighth in overall but did not complete the second race. The duo finished third in GTC class as they did not do any further British GT rounds in 2010.

The team's managing company, named JHR Automotive, was incorporated on 3 February 2011. Later, JHR appeared in the first two rounds of 2011 British GT Championship with a Ginetta G55, fielding Stefan Hodgetts and Adam Morgan. The pair finished 14th overall in the first race but retired from the second race.

On 28 November 2013, the managing company was renamed to JHR Developments (UK) Ltd.

The team has competed in F4 British Championship since its inception, with the 2015 season being JHR Developments's first known single-seater campaign. In 2017, one of the team's British F4 drivers, Billy Monger, was severely crashed during a race at Donington Park. As a result, both of his legs were amputated. During its participation in British F4, the team is known to have a race simulator, which is claimed by the team as "bespoke". The team won all available championships in 2021: Driver, team and rookie.

JHR Developments also formerly competed in one-make racing championships, including Ginetta Junior Championship and Ginetta GT4 Supercup (organised by Ginetta), as well as Renault Clio Cup United Kingdom. However, in August 2017, the team was suspended from competing in Ginetta-organised championships as the team was under investigation because of unknown engine irregularities.

In November 2018, it was announced that the team would compete in GB3 Championship (then BRDC British Formula 3 Championship) from 2019 season; however, the team did not compete. Their BRDC F3 debut occurred in 2020 for a part-time basis with two cars. For this season, Carter Williams, Max Marzorati and Ayrton Simmons drove for the team. The team did not compete in 2021 season, although the team was named as one of the participated teams.

=== 2022–2026 ===
In November 2021, the team announced that it would join the 2022 Formula 4 UAE Championship. The team ended the season without scoring team points. The team also competed in 2022 F4 Spanish Championship as a part-time entry, but failed to score any points.

For the 2022 GB3 season, the team signed Matthew Rees for an initial single-car entry, before expanding to a two-car entry with James Hedley, departing from Elite Motorsport.

Matthew Rees stayed with the team for the 2023 GB3 Championship. The team promoted Joseph Loake from their F4 British outfit for the second car and signed David Morales for the third car. The team claimed the Teams' Championship in this season.

In 2024, the team signed Patrick Heuzenroeder, Josh Irfan and John Bennett for GB3. In late 2024, the team was officially announced to join 2025 season of the Formula Winter Series. However, the team withdrew prior to the start of the season. It is possible that the team had struggled to find drivers for the series.

JHR signed Noah Lisle and Kai Daryanani for the 2025 GB3 Championship. The third car was filled by Divy Nandan, moving to the team from Chris Dittmann Racing ahead of the Zandvoort round and later, Bart Harrison, for the last two rounds. However, the team did not signed any drivers ahead the 2026 GB3 Championship season opener, suggesting they cancelled their GB3 plans prior to season start despite being allocated car numbers and "drive avaliable" driver names, indicating they may enter at a later date. It was confirmed in late October 2026 that JHR Developments would return to GB3 for the 2026 season finale with Thomas Ingram Hill and Lewis Wherrell.

== Current series results ==
=== F4 British Championship ===
F4 British Championship results
| Year | Car | Drivers | Races | Wins | Poles | F/Laps | Podiums | Points | D.C. | T.C. |
|---|---|---|---|---|---|---|---|---|---|---|
| 2015 | Mygale M14-F4 | (United Kingdom) Sennan Fielding | 30 | 3 | 0 | 1 | 11 | 300 | 4th | 5th |
| 2015 | Mygale M14-F4 | (United Kingdom) Jack Butel | 30 | 0 | 0 | 0 | 0 | 38 | 18th | 5th |
| 2016 | Mygale M14-F4 | (United Kingdom) Sennan Fielding | 30 | 5 | 3 | 4 | 11 | 351 | 2nd | 3rd |
| 2016 | Mygale M14-F4 | (United Kingdom) Billy Monger | 27 | 0 | 1 | 1 | 3 | 78 | 12th | 3rd |
| 2016 | Mygale M14-F4 | (United Kingdom) Jack Butel | 27 | 0 | 0 | 0 | 0 | 14 | 18th | 3rd |
| 2017 | Mygale M14-F4 | (Mexico) Manuel Sulaimán | 21 | 0 | 0 | 0 | 1 | 43 | 13th | 5th |
| 2017 | Mygale M14-F4 | (United Kingdom) Billy Monger | 6 | 0 | 0 | 0 | 2 | 44 | 12th | 5th |
| 2017 | Mygale M14-F4 | (United Kingdom) Harry Dyson | 6 | 0 | 0 | 0 | 0 | 0 | 23rd | 5th |
| 2018 | Mygale M14-F4 | (United Kingdom) Ayrton Simmons | 30 | 4 | 3 | 3 | 12 | 374 | 2nd | 3rd |
| 2018 | Mygale M14-F4 | (Mexico) Manuel Sulaimán | 30 | 0 | 0 | 0 | 0 | 95 | 9th | 3rd |
| 2018 | Mygale M14-F4 | (United Kingdom) Josh Skelton | 30 | 0 | 0 | 0 | 0 | 84 | 10th | 3rd |
| 2019 | Mygale M14-F4 | (United Kingdom) Josh Skelton | 30 | 2 | 0 | 4 | 14 | 326.5 | 4th | 2nd |
| 2019 | Mygale M14-F4 | (United States) Carter Williams | 30 | 3 | 0 | 1 | 6 | 230 | 7th | 2nd |
| 2019 | Mygale M14-F4 | (United Kingdom) Alex Walker | 12 | 0 | 0 | 0 | 0 | 17 | 14th | 2nd |
| 2020 | Mygale M14-F4 | (United Kingdom) James Hedley | 27 | 4 | 4 | 7 | 7 | 249 | 5th | 4th |
| 2020 | Mygale M14-F4 | (United Kingdom) Abbi Pulling | 27 | 0 | 0 | 0 | 4 | 191.5 | 6th | 4th |
| 2020 | Mygale M14-F4 | (United Kingdom) Nathanael Hodgkiss | 12 | 0 | 0 | 0 | 0 | 8 | 15th | 4th |
| 2021 | Mygale M14-F4 | (United Kingdom) Matthew Rees | 30 | 4 | 7 | 4 | 10 | 331 | 1st | 1st |
| 2021 | Mygale M14-F4 | (United Kingdom) McKenzy Cresswell | 29 | 6 | 4 | 6 | 11 | 305 | 3rd | 1st |
| 2021 | Mygale M14-F4 | (United Kingdom) Joseph Loake | 30 | 3 | 0 | 3 | 5 | 199 | 6th | 1st |
| 2021 | Mygale M14-F4 | (United Kingdom) Abbi Pulling | 18 | 0 | 0 | 0 | 3 | 97 | 14th | 1st |
| 2021 | Mygale M14-F4 | (Japan) Dougie Bolger † | 30 | 1 | 0 | 0 | 1 | 79 | 15th | 1st |
| 2022 | Tatuus F4-T421 | (United Kingdom) Joseph Loake | 30 | 4 | 2 | 4 | 9 | 271 | 5th | 3rd |
| 2022 | Tatuus F4-T421 | (Bulgaria) Georgi Dimitrov | 30 | 3 | 0 | 0 | 6 | 197 | 8th | 3rd |
| 2022 | Tatuus F4-T421 | (Australia) Noah Lisle | 30 | 0 | 0 | 0 | 1 | 47 | 13th | 3rd |
| 2023 | Tatuus F4-T421 | (United Kingdom) Deagen Fairclough | 30 | 3 | 0 | 6 | 8 | 296 | 3rd | 3rd |
| 2023 | Tatuus F4-T421 | (United Kingdom) Sonny Smith | 20 | 2 | 0 | 0 | 2 | 69 | 16th | 3rd |
| 2023 | Tatuus F4-T421 | (United Kingdom) Tom Mills | 3 | 0 | 0 | 0 | 0 | 0 | 26th | 3rd |
| 2024 | Tatuus F4-T421 | (Algeria) Leo Robinson | 30 | 3 | 0 | 1 | 6 | 164 | 6th | 3rd |
| 2024 | Tatuus F4-T421 | (United Kingdom) Ella Lloyd | 26 | 0 | 0 | 0 | 4 | 99 | 11th | 3rd |
| 2024 | Tatuus F4-T421 | (Sweden) Joel Bergström | 11 | 0 | 0 | 0 | 0 | 41 | 17th | 3rd |
| 2024 | Tatuus F4-T421 | (United Kingdom) Chloe Chong | 30 | 0 | 0 | 0 | 0 | 16 | 24th | 3rd |
| 2024 | Tatuus F4-T421 | (United Kingdom) Harri Reynolds | 2 | 0 | 0 | 0 | 0 | 12 | 25th | 3rd |
| 2025 | Tatuus F4-T421 | (United Kingdom) Rowan Campbell-Pilling | 28 | 1 | 1 | 1 | 3 | 127.5 | 10th | 7th |
| 2025 | Tatuus F4-T421 | (Sweden) Joel Bergström | 11 | 0 | 0 | 0 | 2 | 40 | 20th | 7th |
| 2025 | Tatuus F4-T421 | (United Kingdom) Harri Reynolds | 3 | 0 | 0 | 0 | 0 | 6 | 31st | 7th |
| 2025 | Tatuus F4-T421 | (Netherlands) Esmee Kosterman | 9 | 0 | 0 | 0 | 0 | 4 | 34th | 7th |
| 2025 | Tatuus F4-T421 | (Pakistan) Haarni Sadiq | 9 | 0 | 0 | 0 | 0 | 4 | 35th | 7th |
| 2026 | Tatuus F4-T421 | (United Kingdom) Lewis Wherrell | 30 | 3 | 2 | 3 | 11 | 267 | 3rd | 4th |
| 2026 | Tatuus F4-T421 | (United Kingdom) Cameron Nelson | 30 | 0 | 0 | 0 | 0 | 72 | 14th | 4th |
| 2026 | Tatuus F4-T421 | (Germany) Timo Jüngling | 23 | 1 | 0 | 0 | 1 | 28 | 25th | 4th |
| 2026 | Tatuus F4-T421 | (United Kingdom) Haarni Sadiq (Note: Sadiq is a Pakistani driver racing under a British license for the 2026 F4 British Championship.) | 29 | 0 | 0 | 2 | 0 | 5 | 37th | 4th |
| 2026 | Tatuus F4-T421 | (Singapore) Michael Koh | 3 | 0 | 0 | 0 | 0 | 5 | 39th | 4th |

† Bolger drove for Carlin until round 9.

‡ Smith drove for Phinsys by Argenti in round 1.

=== BRDC British Formula 3 Championship / GB3 Championship ===
| Year | Car | Drivers | Races | Wins | Poles | F/Laps | Podiums | Points | D.C. | T.C. |
|---|---|---|---|---|---|---|---|---|---|---|
| 2020 | Tatuus-Cosworth BF3-020 | (United Kingdom) Ayrton Simmons† | 7 | 2 | 2 | 1 | 4 | 124 | 17th | N/A |
| 2020 | Tatuus-Cosworth BF3-020 | (United States) Carter Williams | 10 | 0 | 0 | 0 | 0 | 73 | 18th | N/A |
| 2020 | Tatuus-Cosworth BF3-020 | (United Kingdom) Max Marzorati† | 13 | 0 | 0 | 0 | 0 | 55 | 21st | N/A |
| 2022 | Tatuus-Cosworth MSV-022 | (United Kingdom) Matthew Rees | 24 | 1 | 1 | 2 | 3 | 314.5 | 6th | 8th |
| 2022 | Tatuus-Cosworth MSV-022 | (United Kingdom) James Hedley‡ | 21 | 0 | 0 | 0 | 1 | 156 | 17th | 8th |
| 2023 | Tatuus-Cosworth MSV-022 | (United Kingdom) Joseph Loake | 23 | 4 | 3 | 3 | 8 | 417 | 3rd | 1st |
| 2023 | Tatuus-Cosworth MSV-022 | (United Kingdom) Matthew Rees | 23 | 1 | 3 | 2 | 6 | 370 | 5th | 1st |
| 2023 | Tatuus-Cosworth MSV-022 | (United States) David Morales | 23 | 0 | 0 | 0 | 0 | 178 | 13th | 1st |
| 2024 | Tatuus-Cosworth MSV-022 | (United Kingdom) John Bennett | 23 | 3 | 3 | 5 | 11 | 456 | 2nd | 4th |
| 2024 | Tatuus-Cosworth MSV-022 | (Australia) Patrick Heuzenroeder | 23 | 0 | 0 | 0 | 1 | 189 | 12th | 4th |
| 2024 | Tatuus-Cosworth MSV-022 | (United Kingdom) Josh Irfan | 23 | 0 | 0 | 0 | 1 | 138 | 16th | 4th |
| 2025 | Tatuus-Cosworth MSV-025 | (Australia) Noah Lisle | 23 | 0 | 0 | 0 | 4 | 287 | 7th | 5th |
| 2025 | Tatuus-Cosworth MSV-025 | (India) Kai Daryanani | 24 | 0 | 0 | 0 | 2 | 219 | 11th | 5th |
| 2025 | Tatuus-Cosworth MSV-025 | (United Kingdom) Bart Harrison | 6 | 0 | 0 | 1 | 1 | 34 | 28th | 5th |
| 2025 | Tatuus-Cosworth MSV-025 | (India) Divy Nandan* | 12 | 0 | 0 | 0 | 0 | 33 | 29th | 5th |
| 2026 | Tatuus-Cosworth MSV-025 | (United Kingdom) Lewis Wherrell | 3 | 0 | 1 | 0 | 1 | 0 | NC | NC |
| 2026 | Tatuus-Cosworth MSV-025 | (United Kingdom) Thomas Ingram Hill | 3 | 0 | 0 | 0 | 0 | 0 | NC | NC |

† Simmons and Marzorati also drove for Chris Dittmann Racing.

‡ Hedley drove for Elite Motorsport prior to round 5.

* Nandan drove for Chris Dittmann Racing in round 1.

== Former series results ==
=== Formula 4 UAE Championship ===
| Year | Car | Drivers | Races | Wins | Poles | F/Laps | Podiums | Points | D.C. | T.C. |
|---|---|---|---|---|---|---|---|---|---|---|
| 2022 | Tatuus F4-T421 | (United Kingdom) Joseph Loake | 8 | 0 | 0 | 0 | 0 | 0 | 27th | 11th |
| 2022 | Tatuus F4-T421 | (South Korea) Michael Shin | 20 | 0 | 0 | 0 | 0 | 0 | 29th | 11th |

=== F4 Spanish Championship ===
| Year | Car | Drivers | Races | Wins | Poles | F/Laps | Podiums | Points | D.C. | T.C. |
|---|---|---|---|---|---|---|---|---|---|---|
| 2022 | Tatuus F4-T421 | (Australia) Noah Lisle† | 9 | 0 | 0 | 0 | 0 | 0 | 29th | 12th |
| 2022 | Tatuus F4-T421 | (United Kingdom) Daniel Guinchard | 3 | 0 | 0 | 0 | 0 | 0 | NC | 12th |

† Lisle drove for Drivex School in round 1.

== Timeline ==
Current series
| F4 British Championship | 2015–present |
| GB3 Championship | 2020, 2022–present |
Former series
| SEAT Cupra Championship | 2008 |
| British GT Championship | 2010–2011 |
| Ginetta Junior Championship | 2011–2017 |
| Ginetta GT4 Supercup | 2011–2015, 2017 |
| Formula 4 UAE Championship | 2022 |
| F4 Spanish Championship | 2022 |
