= Sun Yueyang =

Chinese racing driver

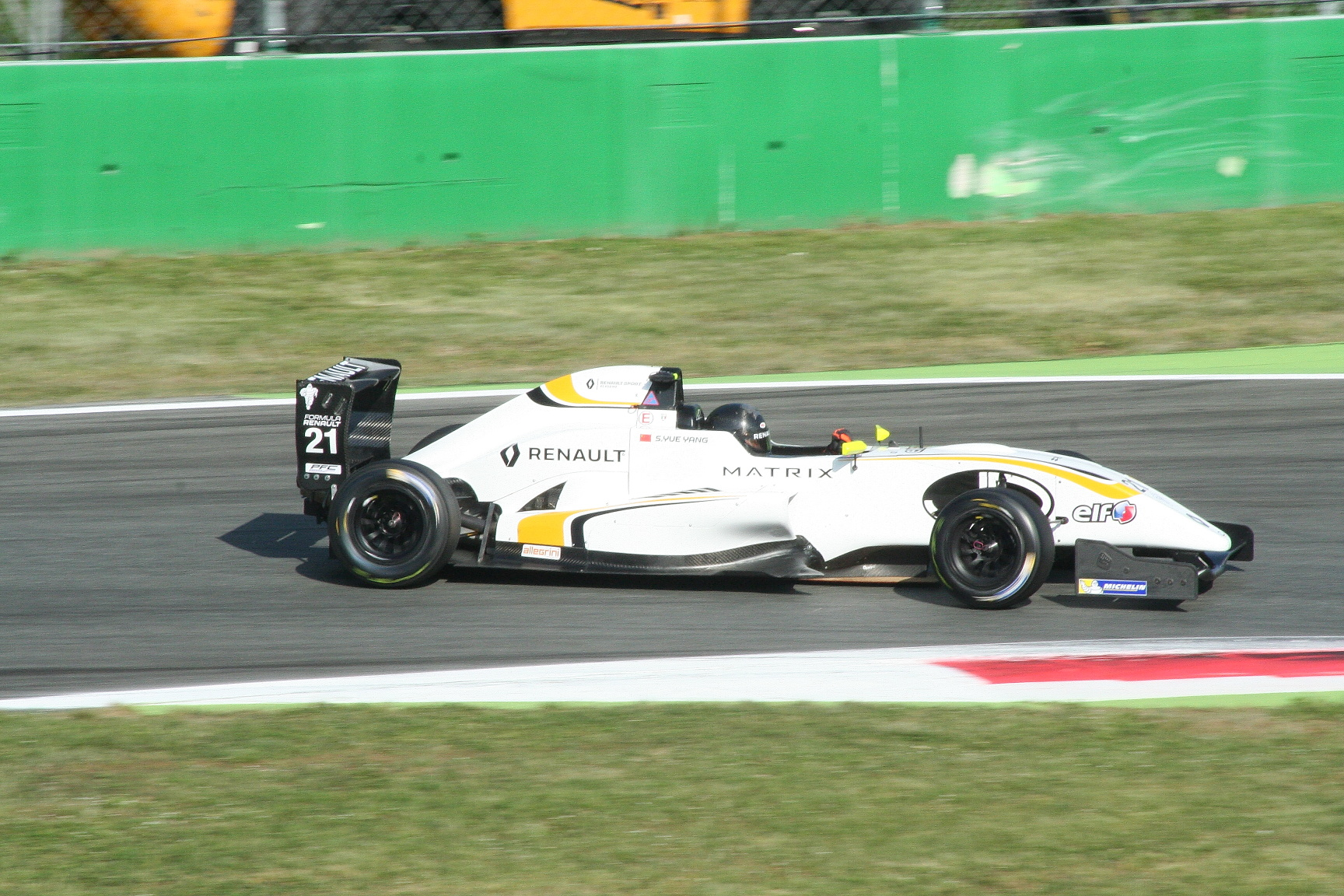
- Nationality: (China) Chinese
- Born: 27 June 2000 (age 26) Shanghai, China

Previous series
- 2018 2017 2017 2016–17: BRDC British Formula 3 Championship; Formula Renault Eurocup; Formula Renault NEC; Formula 4 UAE Championship

Sun Yueyang (Chinese: 孙越扬; pinyin: Sūn Yuèyáng, born 27 June 2000) is a Chinese former racing driver who last competed in the 2018 BRDC British Formula 3 Championship with Carlin. He was part of the Renault Sport Academy between 2016 and 2018.

== Karting record ==
=== Karting career summary ===
Season	Series	Team	Position
2011	Trent Valley Kart Club — Minimax		57th
2013	German Karting Championship — Junior		25th
2014	South Garda Winter Cup — KFJ		28th
2014	WSK Champions Cup — KFJ		27th
2014	Andrea Margutti Trophy — KFJ	Ricky Flynn Motorsport	11th
2014	WSK Super Master Series — KFJ		14th
2014	German Karting Championship — Junior	Ricky Flynn Motorsport	14th
2014	CIK-FIA European Championship — KFJ	Ricky Flynn Motorsport	28th
2014	CIK-FIA World Championship — KFJ		31st
2015	WSK Champions Cup — KFJ		5th
2015	South Garda Winter Cup — KFJ	Ricky Flynn Motorsport	4th
2015	WSK Super Master Series — KFJ		6th
2015	WSK Night Edition — KFJ	Ricky Flynn Motorsport	14th
2015	CIK-FIA European Championship — KFJ		13th
2015	CIK-FIA World Championship — KFJ	Ricky Flynn Motorsport	14th
2015	WSK Final Cup — KFJ		12th
2015	Rotax International Open — Junior	Strawberry Racing	6th
2016	WSK Champions Cup — OK	Ricky Flynn Motorsport	22nd
2016	WSK Night Edition — OK	Ricky Flynn Motorsport	2nd
2016	WSK Super Master Series — OK		24th
2016	CIK-FIA European Championship — OK		20th

== Racing record ==
=== Racing career summary ===
Season	Series	Team	Races	Wins	Poles	F/Laps	Podiums	Points	Position
2016–17	Formula 4 UAE Championship	Dragon F4	4	0	0	0	0	10	15th
2017	Formula Renault Eurocup	JD Motorsport	22	0	0	0	0	0	31st
2017	Formula Renault Northern European Cup	JD Motorsport	7	0	0	0	0	33	16th‡
2018	BRDC British Formula 3 Championship	Carlin	23	1	0	0	2	240	10th

^{‡} Sun was ineligible for points from the second round onwards.

=== Complete Formula Renault NEC results ===
(key) (Races in bold indicate pole position) (Races in italics indicate fastest lap)

Year	Entrant	1	2	3	4	5	6	7	8	9	10	11	DC	Points
2017	JD Motorsport	MNZ; 1; 4	MNZ; 2 Ret	ASS; 1	ASS; 2	NÜR; 1; 12	NÜR; 2; 14	SPA; 1; 34	SPA; 2; 26	SPA; 3 Ret	HOC; 1	HOC; 2	18th	33

=== Complete Formula Renault Eurocup results ===
(key) (Races in bold indicate pole position) (Races in italics indicate fastest lap)

Year	Team	1	2	3	4	5	6	7	8	9	10	11	12	13	14	15	16	17	18	19	20	21	22	23	Pos	Points
2017	JD Motorsport	MNZ; 1; 27	MNZ; 2; 16	SIL; 1; 16	SIL; 2; 24	PAU; 1 Ret	PAU; 2; 21	MON; 1; 23	MON; 2 DNQ	HUN; 1; 19	HUN; 2; 28	HUN; 3; 28	NÜR; 1; 26	NÜR; 2; 21	RBR; 1; 21	RBR; 2; 17	LEC; 1; 21	LEC; 2; 24	SPA; 1; 34	SPA; 2; 26	SPA; 3 Ret	CAT; 1; 25	CAT; 2 Ret	CAT; 3; 24	31st	0

=== Complete BRDC British Formula 3 Championship results ===
(key) (Races in bold indicate pole position; races in italics indicate fastest lap)

Year	Team	1	2	3	4	5	6	7	8	9	10	11	12	13	14	15	16	17	18	19	20	21	22	23	24	DC	Points
2018	Carlin	OUL; 1; 6	OUL; 2; 13	OUL; 3 Ret	ROC; 1; 6	ROC; 2; 11	ROC; 3; 7	SNE; 1; 9	SNE; 2; 12	SNE; 3; 12	SIL1; 1; 13	SIL1; 2; 2^{3}	SIL1; 3; 11	SPA; 1; 9	SPA; 2; 7^{3}	SPA; 3; 9	BHI; 1; 5	BHI; 2; 12	BHI; 3; 13	DON; 1; 20	DON; 2; 1	DON; 3; 9	SIL2; 1; 12	SIL2; 2; 5	SIL2; 3 C	10th	240
