= Kush Maini =

Indian racing driver (born 2000)

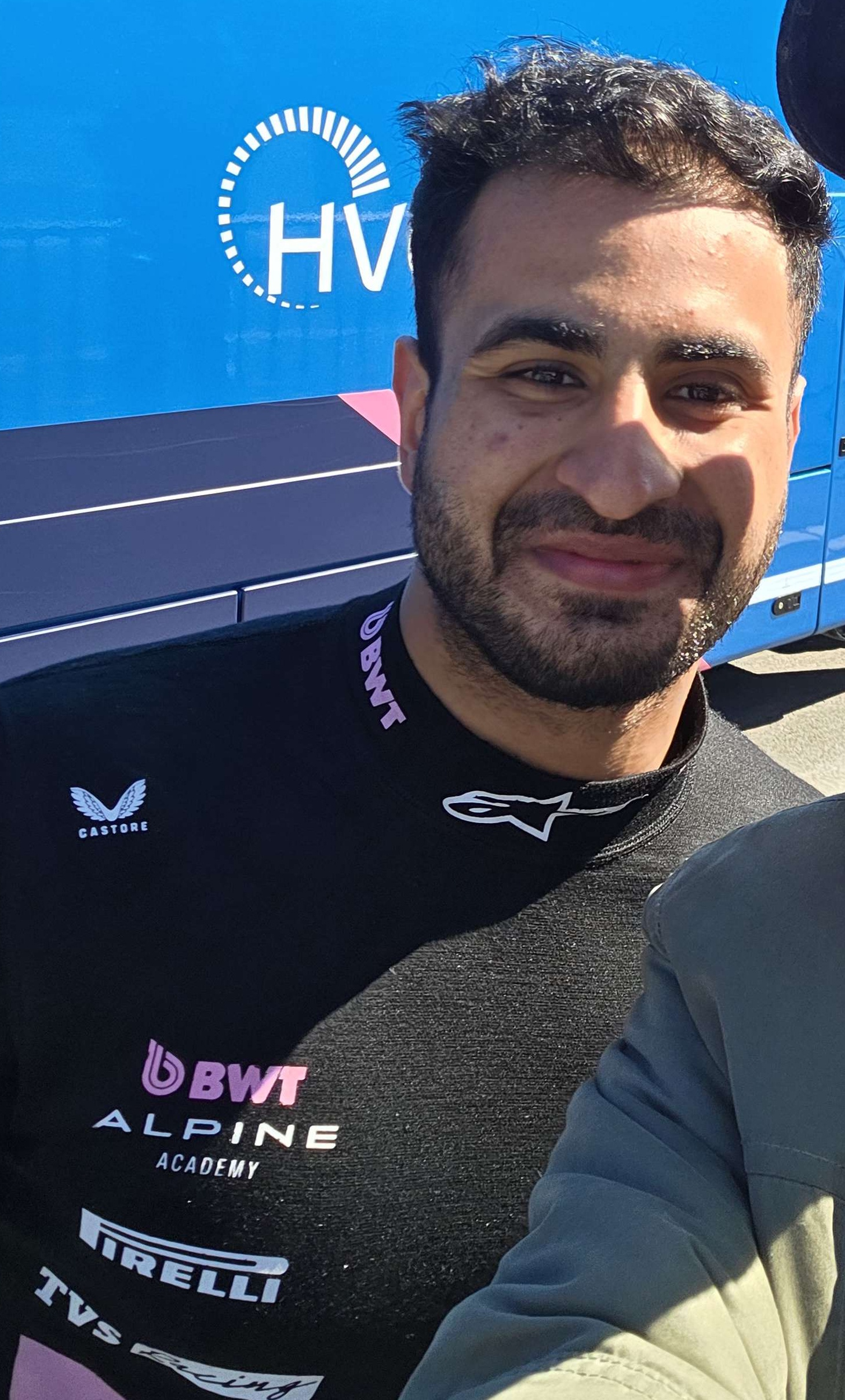
- Maini in Circuit Zandvoort in 2026
- Born: 22 September 2000 (age 26); Bangalore, Karnataka, India
- Relatives: Arjun Maini (brother); Chetan Maini (uncle)
- Nationality: (India) Indian

FIA Formula 2 Championship career
- Debut season: 2023
- Current team: ART Grand Prix
- Categorisation: FIA Silver
- Car number: 16
- Former teams: Campos, Invicta, DAMS
- Starts: 99
- Wins: 3
- Podiums: 10
- Poles: 3
- Fastest laps: 4
- Best finish: 11th in 2023

Previous series
- 2022; 2021; 2021; 2018, 2020; 2019; 2017; 2016–2017: FIA Formula 3; FIA WEC; F3 Asian; BRDC British F3; Formula Renault Eurocup; ADAC F4; Italian F4
- Statistics up to date as of 25 August 2026.

Kush Maini (pronounced [kuʃ ˈmai.ni]; born 22 September 2000) is an Indian racing driver who competes in the FIA Formula 2 Championship for ART Grand Prix as part of the Alpine Academy, and serves as a reserve driver in Formula One for Alpine and in Formula E for Mahindra. Maini has previously competed in Formula 4, the Formula Renault Eurocup, the FIA World Endurance Championship, the BRDC British Formula 3 Championship, and FIA Formula 3.

Born to a prominent Punjabi business family settled in Bengaluru, he is the younger brother of Arjun Maini, also a racing driver who competed in Formula 2 and DTM, and the nephew of Indian business magnate Chetan Maini. He is also the grandson of Sudarshan Maini, founder of Maini Group of industries. Maini is mentored by two-time Formula One champion Mika Häkkinen.

== Career ==
=== Lower formulae ===
==== 2016 ====
Maini started his single-seater career in 2016, competing for BVM Racing in the Italian F4 Championship. His campaign started in a strong fashion, scoring points in the first six races of the year. After a difficult middle part of the year, Maini scored his first podium in car racing, taking third place at the final race in Vallelunga. He finished the season 16th in the standings and ended up fifth in the rookies' championship.

==== 2017 ====
For 2017, Maini moved to Jenzer Motorsport, once again racing in Italian F4, partnering Giorgio Carrara, Federico Malvestiti, Giacomo Bianchi and Job van Uitert. Maini's sophomore year would prove to be more successful, with two podiums at Imola and Monza, as well as a slew of top-five finishes helping him finish eighth in the end results.

=== Progression in single-seaters ===
==== 2018 ====
In 2018, Maini stepped up to the British Formula 3 Championship with Lanan Racing. The season ended up being a breakthrough year, winning the reversed-grid race at Rockingham, and scoring seven further podiums, which meant that Maini would end up third in the standings.

==== 2019 ====
The following year, Maini switched to the Formula Renault Eurocup with M2 Competition. He hit the ground running with a podium in his first race at Monza, but was unable to replicate such result again throughout the season. He was a consistent points scorer though, and came sixth in the standings with 102 points, as the second highest placed rookie.

==== 2020 ====
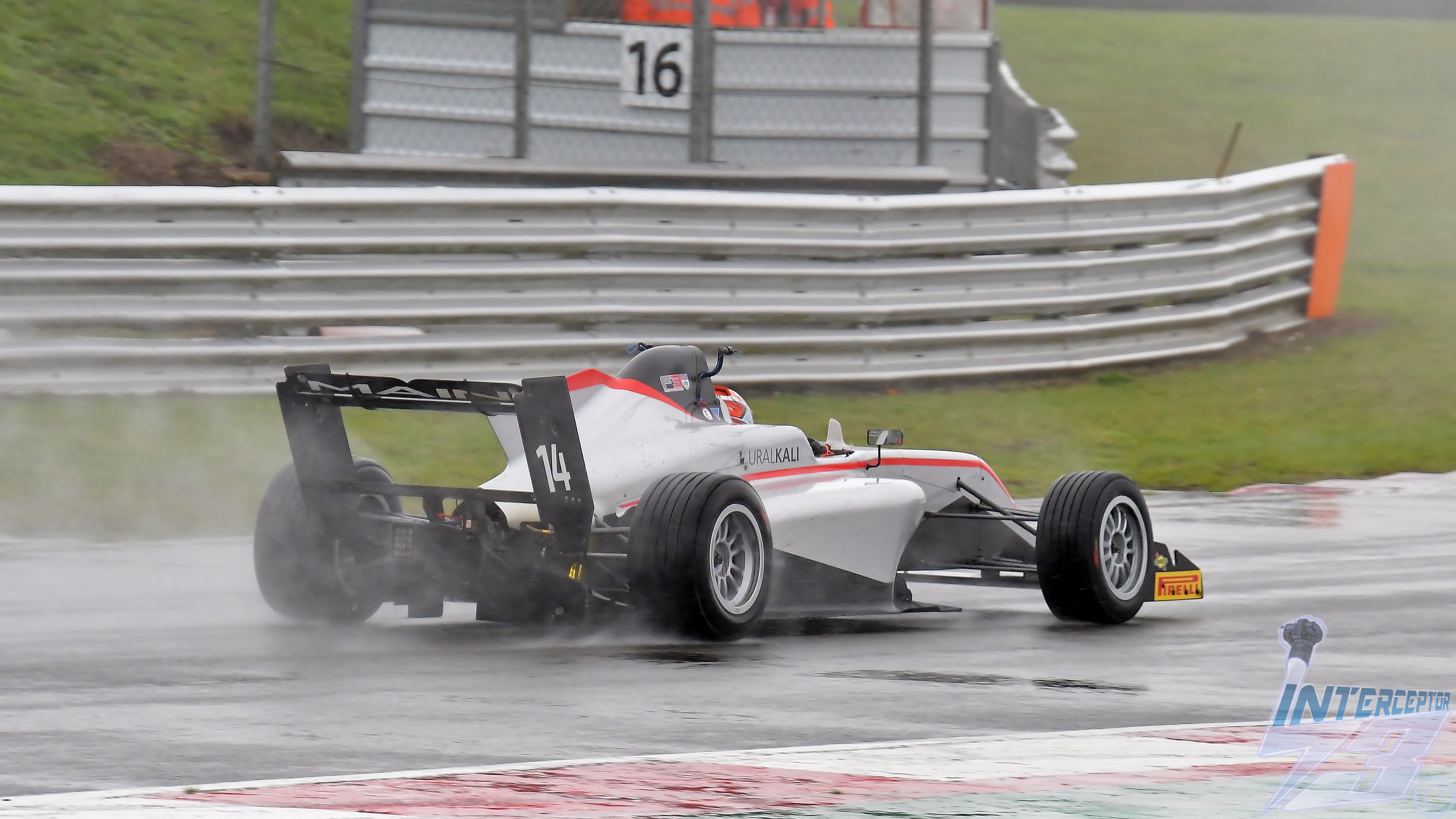
Maini racing in the 2020 BRDC British Formula 3 Championship

Initially intending to remain in the Eurocup in 2020 with 3-time champions R-ace GP, Maini changed his plans following the COVID-19 pandemic and returned to the British F3 series, teaming up with Hitech Grand Prix. Maini was sustained in a title fight with rival Kaylen Frederick, winning three races that season in Brands Hatch, Donington Park and Snetterton. It allowed to place second in the standings.

==== 2021 ====
Maini began 2021 competing for new Indian outfit Mumbai Falcons in the F3 Asian Championship during the winter, partnering Formula 2 driver Jehan Daruvala. He endured a tough start to the season, but a run of seven points finishes in the last nine races, including a podium at the last round in Abu Dhabi, moved him up to 11th place in the standings.

Maini was unable to find a full-time drive for the main season, his sole other race of the year coming at the 6 Hours of Bahrain of the 2021 FIA World Endurance Championship, as a one-off replacement in ARC Bratislava's LMP2 squad.

=== FIA Formula 3 Championship ===
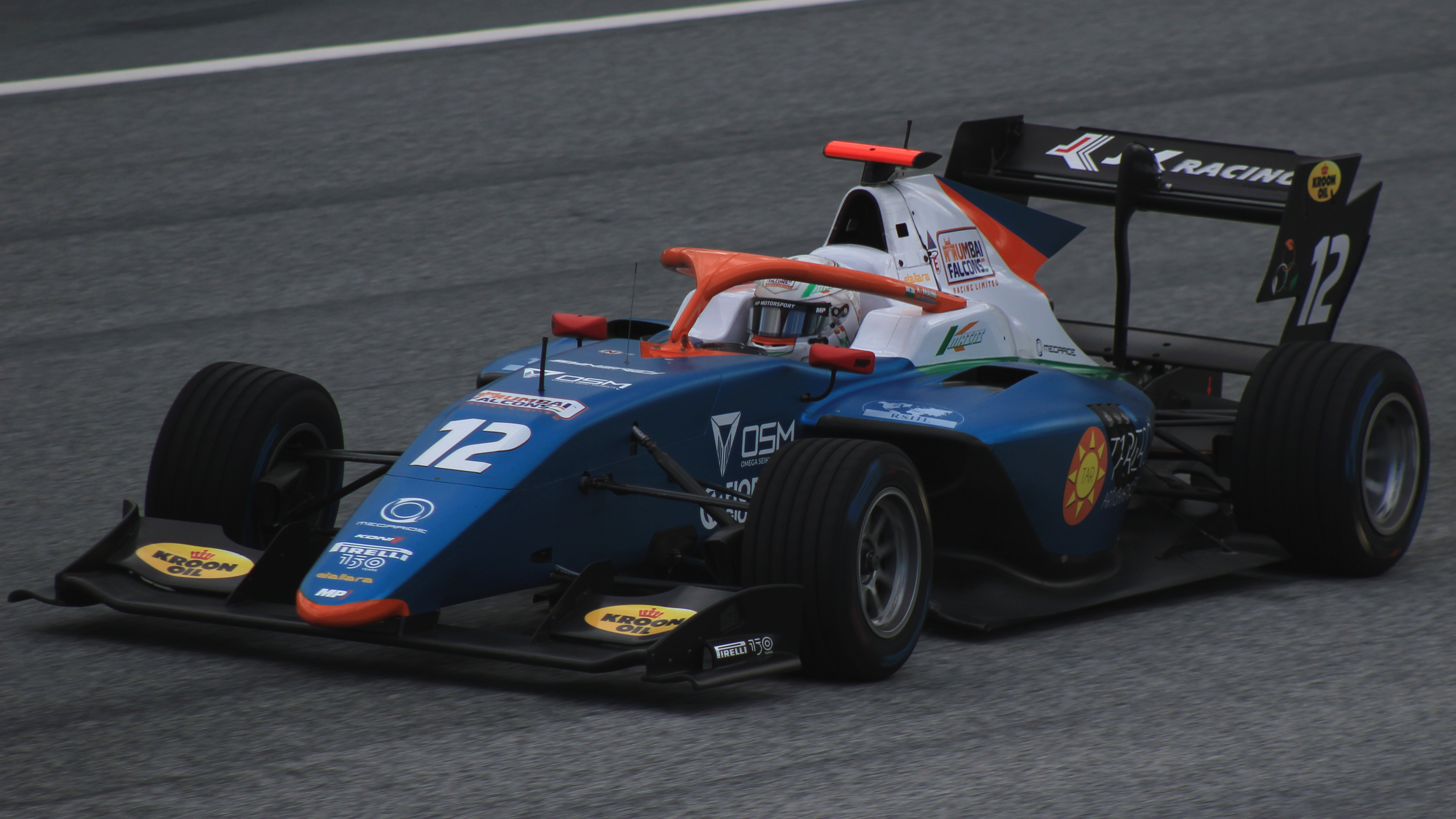
Maini at the Red Bull Ring during the 2022 FIA Formula 3 season.

Maini progressed to the FIA Formula 3 Championship in 2022, driving alongside Caio Collet and Alexander Smolyar at MP Motorsport. Maini was quoted as saying that he was "excited to join MP Motorsport for [his] first year in FIA F3", and that the team's results the previous year showed "their ability to coach rookie drivers on their way to immediately performing well in the series". He started his season off by qualifying in third place in Bahrain, however Maini would be forced to start from the back of the grid for both races due to him missing the weighbridge during the session. At the next round in Imola, Maini scored his first points of the season with a fifth-placed finish. More points followed at Silverstone, where Maini lost out on the podium to Reece Ushijima in the sprint race. Qualifying sixth in Hungary, Maini would experience his best weekend of the season. He finished third on Saturday, after a mistake from Isack Hadjar ahead, thus scoring his only podium of the year. He followed it up with seventh in the feature race. However, this would end up being his final points finish of the year, as Maini ended up 14th in the drivers' standings with 31 points.

=== FIA Formula 2 Championship ===
==== 2023 ====
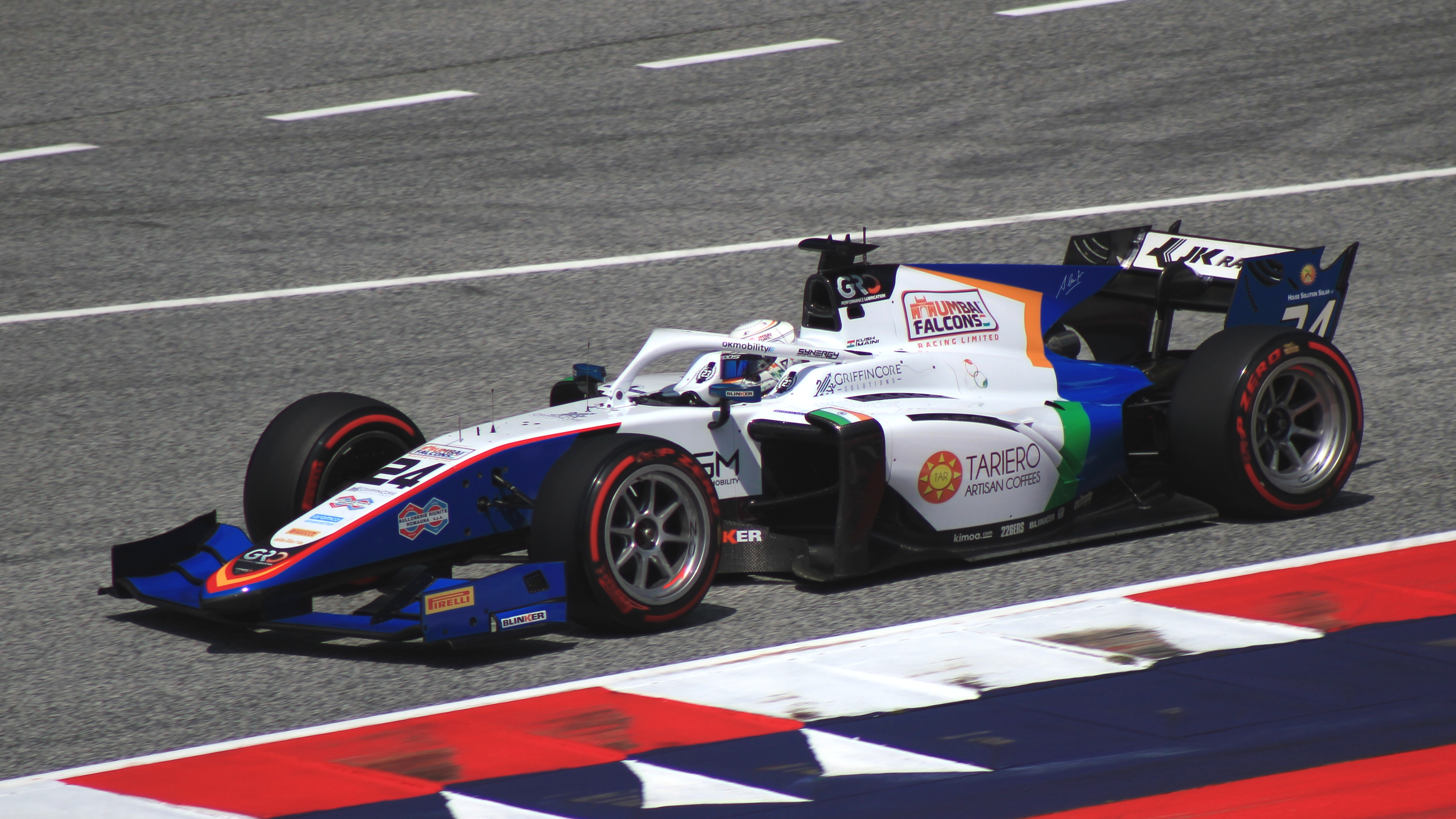
Maini driving the Dallara F2 2018 during the 2023 Spielberg Formula 2 round.

In November 2022, Maini was confirmed to drive for Campos Racing in the 2023 F2 season, also taking part in the 2022 Formula 2 post-season test at the Yas Marina Circuit. He qualified sixth in the Bahrain season opener He made a storming start in the feature race to second, but was later overtaken by teammate Ralph Boschung and late in the race by Zane Maloney, finishing fourth in the end. Fifth place in the Jeddah sprint race boosting him as the highest rookie in the standings, before securing his first and only podium in the Melbourne sprint race after scrapping with Arthur Leclerc. He finished ninth in the feature race. Baku was relatively superb, scoring a huge haul of points with a fourth and fifth place, lifting him to fifth in the standings early on. The next round in Monaco started on a wrong note, being spun on the opening lap in the sprint. Nonetheless, a timely red flag salvaged his weekend, and was able to finish the feature race in sixth place, having not yet changed his tyres prior.

However, Maini endured his first non-scoring round in Barcelona. He too was also unable to in the following two rounds due to incidents and Campos' declining race pace, despite achieving top-four in both qualifying sessions. He returned to the points with sixth in the Budapest sprint race, despite starting on reverse pole. In a chaotic Spa-Francorchamps feature race, Maini advanced to the points, with eighth place. He returned to his qualifying form in Monza, securing sixth. Finishing fifth in the sprint race, he was set for more in the feature race but retired after a collision with Jak Crawford, which broke Maini's front wing. Maini qualified third for the Yas Marina season finale. After accruing a penalty for spinning out Juan Manuel Correa in the sprint, he endured a scruffy feature race saw Maini slip down to ninth place as the chequered flag fell.

Maini ended the season 11th in the drivers' standings, scoring 62 points and one podium, even finishing ahead of countryman and F2 veteran Jehan Daruvala.

==== 2024 ====
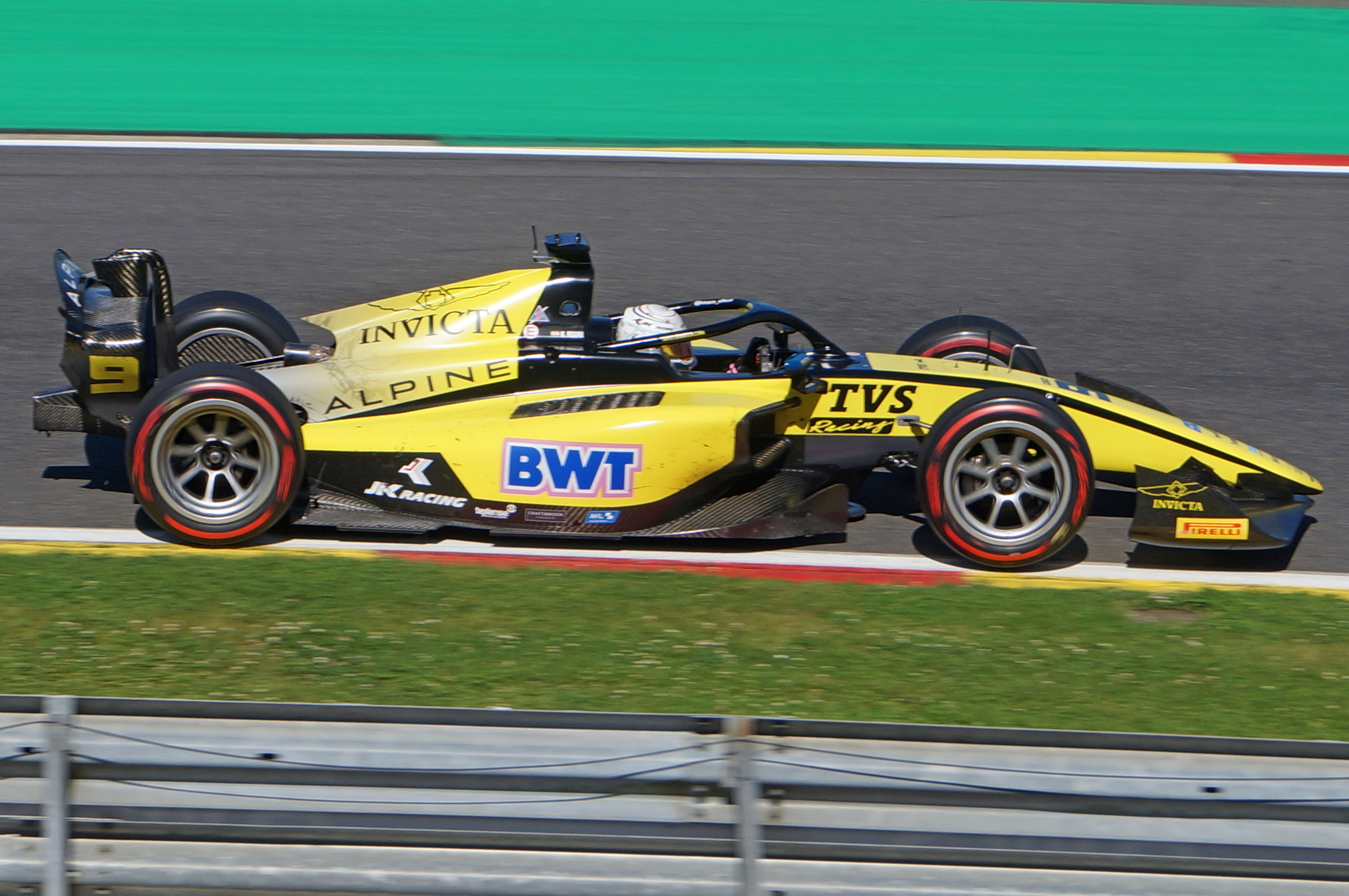
Maini driving the Dallara F2 2024 during the 2024 Spa-Francorchamps Formula 2 round

For his second season in the category, Maini switched to Invicta Racing in 2024 alongside reigning Formula 3 champion and McLaren junior Gabriel Bortoleto. Maini started the season in Bahrain with the fastest lap time in qualifying, but was disqualified due to a technical infringement. After finishing thirteenth in the sprint, Maini starred in an impressive recovery drive in the feature race, making up fourteen places for seventh place.

At the next round in Jeddah, Maini qualified second next to Oliver Bearman, but was later promoted to pole position after Bearman skipped the round to participate in the Formula One Saudi Arabian Grand Prix.

==== 2025 ====
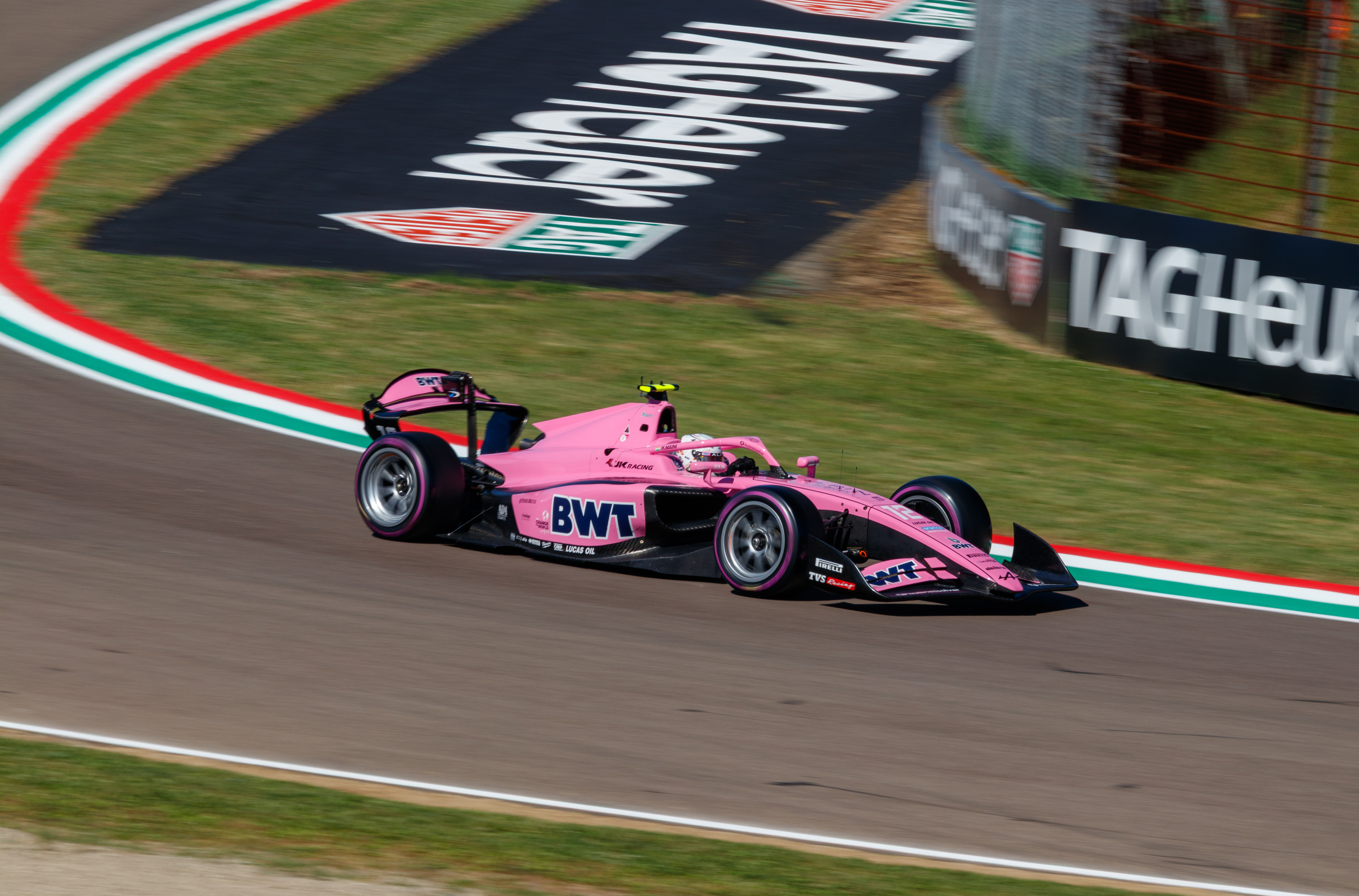
Maini driving for DAMS Lucas Oil during the 2025 Imola Formula 2 round

In 2025, Maini once again switched teams, joining DAMS Lucas Oil alongside Jak Crawford. After a slow start to the season, he took his second F2 victory in the Monaco sprint race, having started from reverse-grid pole.

==== 2026 ====
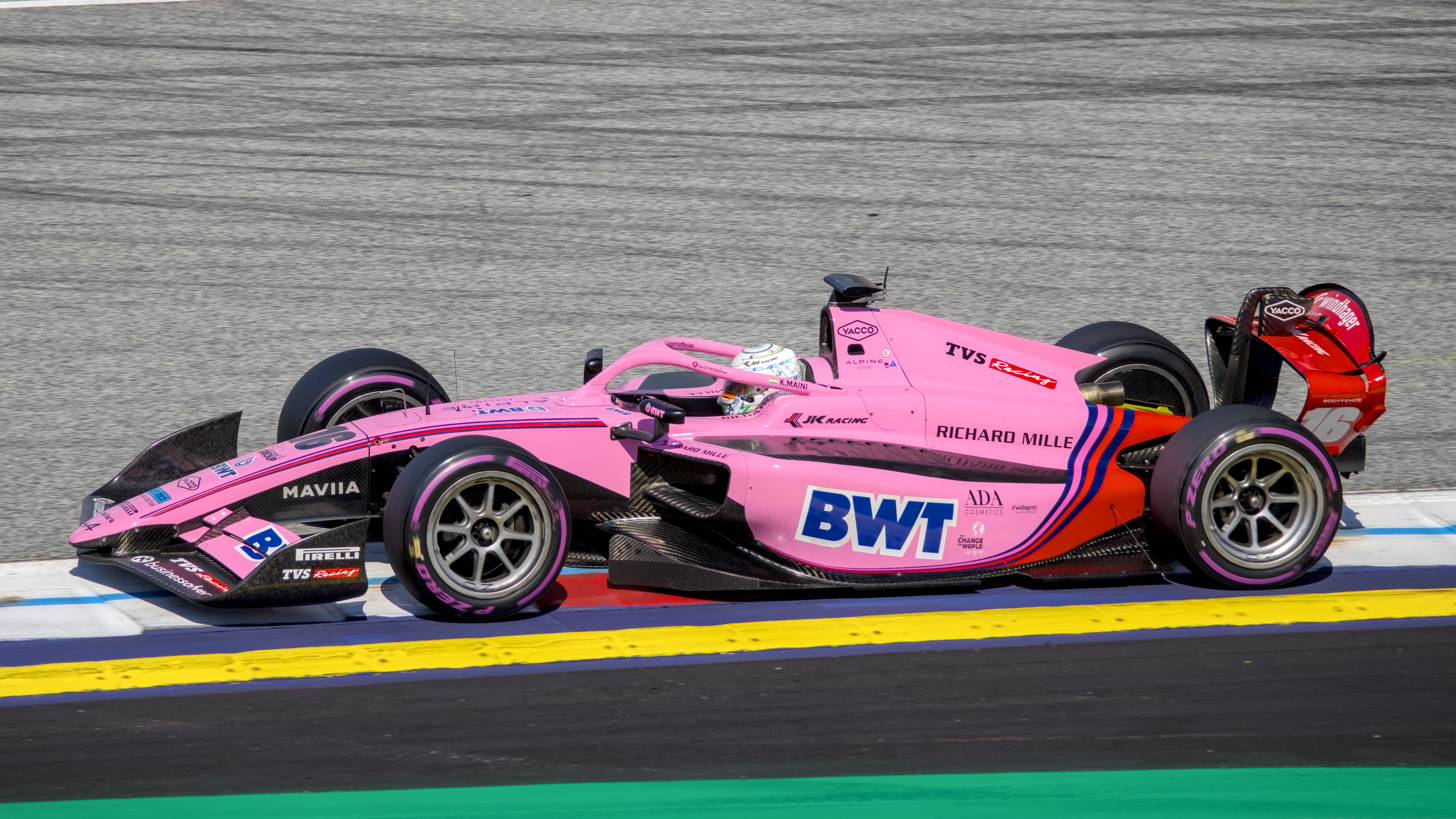
Maini driving for ART Grand Prix during the 2026 Spielberg Formula 2 round

Maini remained in Formula 2 for a fourth season in 2026, joining ART Grand Prix alongside Tasanapol Inthraphuvasak.

=== Formula One ===
In October 2023, Maini was announced to be joining the Alpine Academy. Maini experienced his maiden Formula One test at the Red Bull Ring, driving the Alpine A522 and describing it as "a dream come true". Over the following six months, Maini took part in further tests with Alpine at Imola, Yas Marina and Lusail. In March 2025, Maini was announced as one of the test and reserve drivers for Alpine for the 2025 season, alongside Paul Aron, Franco Colapinto and Ryō Hirakawa. In July that year, Maini drove the Alpine A523 during the 2025 Goodwood Festival of Speed. At the end of the year, he drove the 2025 Alpine A525 during the Yas Marina young drivers' test, where he clocked 128 laps.

Maini continued to act as test and reserve driver for Alpine in 2026.

=== Formula E ===
In November 2023, Maini was confirmed to be the reserve driver for Mahindra Racing for the 2023–24 Formula E season. He took part in the Berlin rookie test with the team later that year. In February 2025, Mahindra Racing selected Maini once again for the rookie free practice session at the Diriyah ePrix, where he topped the timesheets. He returned with Mahindra in July to compete in the Berlin rookie test.

Maini continued as reserve driver for Mahindra for the 2025–26 season. He would make an appearance with the team during the Madrid rookie test.

== Karting record ==
=== Karting career summary ===
Season	Series	Team	Position
2011	Asian Karting Open Championship - Mini ROK		4th
2011	JK Tyre National Karting Championship - Rotax Micromax	Maini Racing	1st
2011	All Stars Karting Championship Malaysia - Yamaha Cadet	SRV Motorsports	
2012	Andrea Margutti Trophy - 60 Mini	Baby Race	5th
2012	41° Trofeo delle Industrie - 60 Mini	Baby Race	3rd
2012	WSK Super Master Series - Mini		8th
2012	WSK Euro Series - 60 Mini		14th
2012	ROK Cup International Final - Mini ROK		7th
2013	WSK Super Master Series - Mini		3rd
2013	Andrea Margutti Trophy - 60 Mini		28th
2013	WSK Euro Series - 60 Mini	Babyrace Srl	2nd
2013	42° Trofeo delle Industrie - KF3		15th
2014	WSK Champions Cup - KF Junior		38th
2014	CIK-FIA European Championship - KF Junior	Babyrace Srl	31st
2014	Andrea Margutti Trophy - KF Junior	Baby Race	16th
2014	CIK-FIA World Championship - KF Junior	RB Kart Technology SA	4th
2014	Italian ACI Karting Championship - KF3		13th
2015	WSK Champions Cup - KF Junior		4th
2015	20° South Garda Winter Cup - KF Junior	Forza Racing	33rd
2015	WSK Night Edition - KF Junior	Forza Racing	11th
2015	Andrea Margutti Trophy - KF Junior	Forza Racing	1st
2015	WSK Super Master Series - KF Junior		7th
2015	CIK-FIA European Championship - KF Junior		10th

== Racing record ==
=== Racing career summary ===
Season	Series	Team	Races	Wins	Poles	F/Laps	Podiums	Points	Position
2016	Italian F4 Championship	BVM Racing	21	0	0	0	1	53	16th
2017	Italian F4 Championship	Jenzer Motorsport	21	0	0	0	2	114	8th
2017	ADAC Formula 4 Championship	Jenzer Motorsport	3	0	0	0	0	0	NC†
2018	BRDC British Formula 3 Championship	Lanan Racing	23	1	2	4	8	366	**3rd**
2019	Formula Renault Eurocup	M2 Competition	20	0	0	0	1	102	6th
2020	BRDC British Formula 3 Championship	Hitech Grand Prix	24	3	2	1	12	448	**2nd**
2021	F3 Asian Championship	Mumbai Falcons India Racing Ltd.	14	0	0	2	1	55	11th
2021	FIA World Endurance Championship - LMP2	ARC Bratislava	1	0	0	0	0	1	30th
2022	FIA Formula 3 Championship	MP Motorsport	18	0	0	0	1	31	14th
2023	FIA Formula 2 Championship	Campos Racing	26	0	0	0	1	62	11th
2023–24	Formula E	Mahindra Racing	Reserve driver						
2024	FIA Formula 2 Championship	Invicta Racing	28	1	1	1	5	74	13th
2024–25	Formula E	Mahindra Racing	Reserve driver						
2025	FIA Formula 2 Championship	DAMS Lucas Oil	27	1	0	2	1	32	16th
2025	Formula One	BWT Alpine F1 Team	Test & reserve driver						
2025–26	Formula E	Mahindra Racing	Reserve driver						
2026	FIA Formula 2 Championship	ART Grand Prix	17	1	2	1	2	69	7th*
2026	Formula One	BWT Alpine F1 Team	Test & reserve driver						

^{†} As Maini was a guest driver, he was ineligible to score points.
* Season still in progress.

=== Complete Italian F4 Championship results ===
(key) (Races in bold indicate pole position) (Races in italics indicate fastest lap)

Year	Team	1	2	3	4	5	6	7	8	9	10	11	12	13	14	15	16	17	18	19	20	21	22	23	Pos	Points
2016	BVM Racing	MIS; 1; 8	MIS; 2	MIS; 3; 10	MIS; 4; 8	ADR; 1	ADR; 2; 7	ADR; 3; 6	ADR; 4; 10	IMO1; 1; 15	IMO1; 2; 12	IMO1; 3; 13	MUG; 1; 18	MUG; 2 Ret	MUG; 3; 16	VLL; 1; 26	VLL; 2; 8	VLL; 3; 3	IMO2; 1; 6	IMO2; 2 Ret	IMO2; 3; 13	MNZ; 1 Ret	MNZ; 2; 7	MNZ; 3; 21	16th	53
2017	Jenzer Motorsport	MIS; 1 Ret	MIS; 2; 11	MIS; 3; 24	ADR; 1; 4	ADR; 2; 8	ADR; 3; 7	VLL; 1; 7	VLL; 2; 9	VLL; 3; 15	MUG1; 1; 5	MUG1; 2; 18	MUG1; 3 Ret	IMO; 1; 4	IMO; 2; 3	IMO; 3; 9	MUG2; 1; 9	MUG2; 2; 4	MUG2; 3; 18	MNZ; 1; 6	MNZ; 2; 7	MNZ; 3; 3			8th	114

=== Complete ADAC Formula 4 Championship results ===
(key) (Races in bold indicate pole position) (Races in italics indicate fastest lap)

Year	Team	1	2	3	4	5	6	7	8	9	10	11	12	13	14	15	16	17	18	19	20	21	Pos	Points
2017	Jenzer Motorsport	OSC1; 1	OSC1; 2	OSC1; 3	LAU; 1	LAU; 2	LAU; 3	RBR; 1; 9	RBR; 2; 20	RBR; 3 Ret	OSC2; 1	OSC2; 2	OSC2; 3	NÜR; 1	NÜR; 2	NÜR; 3	SAC; 1	SAC; 2	SAC; 3	HOC; 1	HOC; 2	HOC; 3	NC†	0

^{†} As Maini was a guest driver, he was ineligible to score points.

=== Complete BRDC British Formula 3 Championship results ===
(key) (Races in bold indicate pole position) (Races in italics indicate fastest lap)

Year	Team	1	2	3	4	5	6	7	8	9	10	11	12	13	14	15	16	17	18	19	20	21	22	23	24	Pos	Points
2018	Lanan Racing	OUL; 1; 9	OUL; 2; 5^{3}	OUL; 3; 3	ROC; 1; 7	ROC; 2; 1^{4}	**ROC**; **3**; 3	SNE; 1; 2	SNE; 2; 14^{2}	SNE; 3; 3	SIL; 1; 2	SIL; 2; 14^{2}	**SIL**; **3**; 3	SPA; 1; 7	SPA; 2; 10^{7}	SPA; 3; 11	BRH; 1; 6	BRH; 2; 3^{7}	BRH; 3; 6	DON; 1; 5	DON; 2 Ret	DON; 3; 15	SIL; 1; 11	SIL; 2; 6	SIL; 3 C	3rd	366
2020	Hitech Grand Prix	OUL; 1; 14	OUL; 2; 2	OUL; 3; 10	OUL; 4; 2	DON1; 1; 3	DON1; 2; 6^{10}	**DON1**; **3**; 3	BRH; 1; 2	BRH; 2; 11^{2}	BRH; 3; 3	**BRH**; **4**; 1	DON2; 1; 3	DON2; 2; 10^{4}	DON2; 3; 1	SNE; 1; 11	SNE; 2; 1^{2}	SNE; 3; 15	SNE; 4; 7	DON3; 1; 9	DON3; 2; 4^{9}	DON3; 3; 3	SIL; 1; 3	SIL; 2; 17	SIL; 3; 6	2nd	448

=== Complete Formula Renault Eurocup results ===
(key) (Races in bold indicate pole position) (Races in italics indicate fastest lap)

Year	Team	1	2	3	4	5	6	7	8	9	10	11	12	13	14	15	16	17	18	19	20	Pos	Points
2019	M2 Competition	MNZ; 1; 3	MNZ; 2; 5	SIL; 1; 18	SIL; 2; 6	MON; 1; 10	MON; 2; 11	LEC; 1; 6	LEC; 2; 21	SPA; 1; 5	SPA; 2; 9	NÜR; 1; 7	NÜR; 2; 8	HUN; 1; 15	HUN; 2; 5	CAT; 1 Ret	CAT; 2; 12	HOC; 1; 7	HOC; 2; 4	YMC; 1; 6	YMC; 2 Ret	6th	102

=== Complete F3 Asian Championship results ===
(key) (Races in bold indicate pole position) (Races in italics indicate the fastest lap of top ten finishers)

Year	Entrant	1	2	3	4	5	6	7	8	9	10	11	12	13	14	15	DC	Points
2021	Mumbai Falcons India Racing Ltd.	DUB; 1; 21	DUB; 2 DNS	DUB; 3; 20	ABU; 1; 12	ABU; 2; 11	ABU; 3; 17	ABU; 1; 8	ABU; 2; 7	ABU; 3; 8	DUB; 1 NC	DUB; 2 Ret	DUB; 3; 5	ABU; 1; 3	ABU; 2; 4	ABU; 3; 8	11th	55

=== Complete FIA World Endurance Championship results ===
(key) (Races in bold indicate pole position) (Races in italics indicate fastest lap)

Year	Entrant	Class	Chassis	Engine	1	2	3	4	5	6	Rank	Points
2021	ARC Bratislava	LMP2	Oreca 07	Gibson GK428 4.2 L V8	SPA	ALG	MNZ	LMS	BHR; 10	BHR	30th	1

=== Complete FIA Formula 3 Championship results ===
(key) (Races in bold indicate pole position; races in italics indicate points for the fastest lap of top ten finishers)

Year	Entrant	1	2	3	4	5	6	7	8	9	10	11	12	13	14	15	16	17	18	DC	Points
2022	MP Motorsport	BHR; SPR; 15	BHR; FEA; 16	IMO; SPR; 20	IMO; FEA; 5	CAT; SPR; 17	CAT; FEA; 25	SIL; SPR; 4	SIL; FEA; 22	RBR; SPR; 19	RBR; FEA; 25†	HUN; SPR; 3	HUN; FEA; 7	SPA; SPR; 13	SPA; FEA; Ret	ZAN; SPR; 18	ZAN; FEA; 11	MNZ; SPR; 11	MNZ; FEA; 13	14th	31

=== Complete FIA Formula 2 Championship results ===
(key) (Races in bold indicate pole position) (Races in italics indicate points for the fastest lap of top ten finishers)

Year	Entrant	1	2	3	4	5	6	7	8	9	10	11	12	13	14	15	16	17	18	19	20	21	22	23	24	25	26	27	28	29	DC	Points
2023	Campos Racing	BHR; SPR; 7	BHR; FEA; 4	JED; SPR; 5	JED; FEA; 12	MEL; SPR; 3	MEL; FEA; 9	BAK; SPR; 4	BAK; FEA; 5	MCO; SPR; 13	MCO; FEA; 6	CAT; SPR; 18	CAT; FEA; 17	RBR; SPR; 16	RBR; FEA; Ret	SIL; SPR; 13	SIL; FEA; Ret	HUN; SPR; 6	HUN; FEA; 20	SPA; SPR; 18	SPA; FEA; 8	ZAN; SPR; Ret	ZAN; FEA; 18	MNZ; SPR; 5	MNZ; FEA; Ret	YMC; SPR; 13	YMC; FEA; 9				11th	62
2024	Invicta Racing	BHR; SPR; 13	BHR; FEA; 7	JED; SPR; 8	**JED**; **FEA**; 2	MEL; SPR; 3	MEL; FEA; 12	IMO; SPR; 8	IMO; FEA; 14	MON; SPR; Ret	MON; FEA; 17	CAT; SPR; 2	CAT; FEA; 6	RBR; SPR; 7	RBR; FEA; 17	SIL; SPR; 3	SIL; FEA; 19	HUN; SPR; 1	HUN; FEA; 7	SPA; SPR; 13	SPA; FEA; 15	MNZ; SPR; 11	MNZ; FEA; 15	BAK; SPR; 9	BAK; FEA; DSQ	LSL; SPR; 20†	LSL; FEA; 14	YMC; SPR; 17	YMC; FEA; 12		13th	74
2025	DAMS Lucas Oil	MEL; SPR; 16	MEL; FEA; C	BHR; SPR; 16	BHR; FEA; 18	JED; SPR; 10	JED; FEA; 10	IMO; SPR; 13	IMO; FEA; 21	MON; SPR; 1	MON; FEA; 6	CAT; SPR; 16	CAT; FEA; 7	RBR; SPR; 17	RBR; FEA; 16	SIL; SPR; 4	SIL; FEA; 16	SPA; SPR; NC	SPA; FEA; 20	HUN; SPR; 9	HUN; FEA; 11	MNZ; SPR; Ret	MNZ; FEA; 12	BAK; SPR; Ret	BAK; FEA; 20†	LSL; SPR; Ret	LSL; FEA; 16	YMC; SPR; 16	YMC; FEA; 7		16th	32
2026	ART Grand Prix	MEL; SPR; 12	MEL; FEA; 16	MIA; SPR; Ret	**MIA**; **FEA**; 5	MTL; SPR; 12	MTL; FEA; 9	MON; SPR; 7	MON; FEA; 4	CAT; SPR; 1	CAT; FEA; 9	RBR; SPR; 7	RBR; FEA; 12	SIL; SPR; 4	SIL; FEA; 3	SPA; SPR; 15	SPA; FEA; 16	HUN; SPR; 5	**HUN**; **FEA**; 2	MNZ; SPR; 20	MNZ; FEA; 17	MAD; SPR; Ret	MAD; FEA; Ret	BAK; SPR; 8	BAK; FEA1; 10	BAK; FEA2; 12	LSL; SPR	LSL; FEA	YMC; SPR	YMC; FEA	9th*	90*

* Season still in progress.
