= 2018 BRDC British Formula 3 Championship =

Motor racing competition

The 2018 BRDC British Formula 3 Championship was a motor racing championship for open wheel, formula racing cars held across England, with one round in Belgium. The 2018 season was the third organised by the British Racing Drivers' Club in the United Kingdom. The championship featured a mix of professional motor racing teams and privately funded drivers, and also featured the 2-litre 230-bhp Tatuus-Cosworth single seat race car in the main series. The season commenced at Oulton Park on 31 March and ended on 14 October at Silverstone Circuit, after eight triple header events for a total of twenty-four races.

== Teams and drivers ==
All teams were British-registered.

Team	No.	Driver	Rounds
Lanan Racing	2	(India) Kush Maini	All
Lanan Racing	21	(United Kingdom) Josh Mason	2, 5–8
Hillspeed	3	(Canada) Ben Hurst	All
Hillspeed	31	(Germany) Jusuf Owega	2–8
Hillspeed	45	(Thailand) Sasakorn Chaimongkol	All
Douglas Motorsport	55	(United Kingdom) Jamie Chadwick	All
Douglas Motorsport	66	(Sweden) Arvin Esmaeili	All
Douglas Motorsport	86	(United Kingdom) Jordan Cane	1–4
Douglas Motorsport	86	(Belgium) Max Defourny	5, 7
Fortec Motorsports	11	(France) Tristan Charpentier	1–5
Fortec Motorsports	22	(United Kingdom) Tom Gamble	All
Fortec Motorsports	33	(Venezuela) Manuel Maldonado	All
Fortec Motorsports	44	(Sweden) Hampus Ericsson	7–8
Chris Dittmann Racing	12	(United Kingdom) Ayrton Simmons	5, 7–8
Chris Dittmann Racing	19	(United Kingdom) Harry Webb	3
Chris Dittmann Racing	19	(Republic of Ireland) Cian Carey	7
Chris Dittmann Racing	68	(Malaysia) Chia Wing Hoong	1–2
Carlin	17	(France) Clément Novalak	1–2, 4, 8
Carlin	23	(United Kingdom) Billy Monger	All
Carlin	38	(United Kingdom) Jamie Caroline	5–7
Carlin	63	(Denmark) Nicolai Kjærgaard	All
Carlin	88	(China) Sun Yueyang	All
Double R Racing	24	(India) Krishnaraaj Mahadik	All
Double R Racing	26	(Sweden) Linus Lundqvist	All
Double R Racing	28	(Singapore) Pavan Ravishankar	All

- Alexandra Mohnhaupt was initially entered to drive Douglas Motorsport's #86 but did not appear at any rounds due to injury.

== Race calendar and results ==
The calendar was revealed on 21 November 2017. The series supported British GT at all events, excluding the finale at Silverstone Circuit. It had one overseas round at Spa-Francorchamps in Belgium.

Round		Circuit	Date	Pole position	Fastest lap	Winning driver	Winning team
1	R1	Oulton Park (International Circuit, Cheshire)	31 March	(United Kingdom) Clément Novalak	(Denmark) Nicolai Kjærgaard	(Sweden) Linus Lundqvist	Double R Racing
1	R2	Oulton Park (International Circuit, Cheshire)	2 April		(United Kingdom) Billy Monger	(Venezuela) Manuel Maldonado	Fortec Motorsports
1	R3	Oulton Park (International Circuit, Cheshire)	2 April	(Denmark) Nicolai Kjærgaard	(United Kingdom) Tom Gamble	(Denmark) Nicolai Kjærgaard	Carlin
2	R4	Rockingham (National Circuit, Northamptonshire)	28 April	(United Kingdom) Tom Gamble	(United Kingdom) Tom Gamble	(United Kingdom) Tom Gamble	Fortec Motorsports
2	R5	Rockingham (National Circuit, Northamptonshire)	29 April		(India) Kush Maini	(India) Kush Maini	Lanan Racing
2	R6	Rockingham (National Circuit, Northamptonshire)	29 April	(India) Kush Maini	(Sweden) Linus Lundqvist	(Sweden) Linus Lundqvist	Double R Racing
3	R7	Snetterton Circuit (300 Circuit, Norfolk)	26 May	(Denmark) Nicolai Kjærgaard	(Sweden) Linus Lundqvist	(Denmark) Nicolai Kjærgaard	Carlin
3	R8	Snetterton Circuit (300 Circuit, Norfolk)	27 May		(India) Kush Maini	(Venezuela) Manuel Maldonado	Fortec Motorsports
3	R9	Snetterton Circuit (300 Circuit, Norfolk)	27 May	(Sweden) Linus Lundqvist	(Denmark) Nicolai Kjærgaard	(Sweden) Linus Lundqvist	Double R Racing
4	R10	Silverstone Circuit (Grand Prix, Northamptonshire)	9 June	(Sweden) Linus Lundqvist	(India) Kush Maini	(Sweden) Linus Lundqvist	Double R Racing
4	R11	Silverstone Circuit (Grand Prix, Northamptonshire)	10 June		(United Kingdom) Tom Gamble	(Singapore) Pavan Ravishankar	Double R Racing
4	R12	Silverstone Circuit (Grand Prix, Northamptonshire)	10 June	(India) Kush Maini	(United Kingdom) Tom Gamble (India) Kush Maini	(United Kingdom) Tom Gamble	Fortec Motorsports
5	R13	Spa-Francorchamps (Belgium)	21 July	(United Kingdom) Tom Gamble	(United Kingdom) Tom Gamble	(Sweden) Linus Lundqvist	Double R Racing
5	R14	Spa-Francorchamps (Belgium)	22 July		(Sweden) Linus Lundqvist	(United Kingdom) Jamie Caroline	Carlin
5	R15	Spa-Francorchamps (Belgium)	22 July	(United Kingdom) Tom Gamble	(United Kingdom) Tom Gamble	(Sweden) Linus Lundqvist	Double R Racing
6	R16	Brands Hatch (Grand Prix Circuit, Kent)	4 August	(United Kingdom) Jamie Caroline	(Denmark) Nicolai Kjærgaard	(United Kingdom) Jamie Caroline	Carlin
6	R17	Brands Hatch (Grand Prix Circuit, Kent)	5 August		(United Kingdom) Billy Monger	(United Kingdom) Jamie Chadwick	Douglas Motorsport
6	R18	Brands Hatch (Grand Prix Circuit, Kent)	5 August	(Denmark) Nicolai Kjærgaard	(Denmark) Nicolai Kjærgaard	(Denmark) Nicolai Kjærgaard	Carlin
7	R19	Donington Park (Grand Prix Circuit, Leicestershire)	22 September	(United Kingdom) Billy Monger	(United Kingdom) Jamie Caroline	(Denmark) Nicolai Kjærgaard	Carlin
7	R20	Donington Park (Grand Prix Circuit, Leicestershire)	23 September		(United Kingdom) Billy Monger	(China) Sun Yueyang	Carlin
7	R21	Donington Park (Grand Prix Circuit, Leicestershire)	23 September	(United Kingdom) Billy Monger	(Denmark) Nicolai Kjærgaard	(Denmark) Nicolai Kjærgaard	Carlin
8	R22	Silverstone Circuit (Grand Prix, Northamptonshire)	13 October	(Sweden) Linus Lundqvist	(Sweden) Linus Lundqvist	(Sweden) Linus Lundqvist	Double R Racing
8	R23	Silverstone Circuit (Grand Prix, Northamptonshire)	14 October		(United Kingdom) Tom Gamble	(United Kingdom) Joshua Mason	Lanan Racing
8	R24	Silverstone Circuit (Grand Prix, Northamptonshire)	14 October	Race cancelled due to adverse weather conditions			

== Championship standings ==
Scoring system

Points were awarded to the top 20 classified finishers in races one and three, with the second race awarding points to only the top 15. Race two, which reversed the order of the race one finishers, providing they set a lap time within 103% of the fastest driver, will be awarded extra points for positions gained from drivers' respective starting positions.

Races	Position, points per race																			
Races	1st	2nd	3rd	4th	5th	6th	7th	8th	9th	10th	11th	12th	13th	14th	15th	16th	17th	18th	19th	20th
Races 1 & 3	35	29	24	21	19	17	15	13	12	11	10	9	8	7	6	5	4	3	2	1
Race 2	20	17	15	13	11	10	9	8	7	6	5	4	3	2	1					

Notes

- ^{1} ^{2} ^{3} refers to positions gained and thus extra points earned during race two.

=== Drivers' championship ===
Pos	Driver	OUL			ROC			SNE			SIL			SPA			BRH			DON			SIL (Note: Race 2 at Silverstone was red-flagged after 2 laps and was not resumed due to adverse weather conditions. Due to regulations full points were awarded. The conditions also forced a cancellation of Race 3.)			Pts
1	(Sweden) Linus Lundqvist	1	8^{8}	5	2	3^{7}	1	3	4^{11}	**1**	**1**	6^{11}	2	1	8^{10}	1	2	11^{3}	3	8	Ret	11	**1**	16	C	531
2	(Denmark) Nicolai Kjærgaard	2	4^{11}	**1**	Ret	2^{11}	2	**1**	Ret	2	6	4^{8}	4	5	12^{1}	Ret	3	9^{4}	**1**	1	10^{8}	1	Ret	17	C	446
3	(India) Kush Maini	9	5^{3}	3	7	1^{4}	**3**	2	14^{2}	3	2	14^{2}	**3**	7	10^{7}	11	6	3^{7}	6	5	Ret	15	11	6	C	366
4	(India) Krishnaraaj Mahadik	5	Ret	9	4	4^{4}	6	10	2^{6}	11	9	17	10	3	6^{9}	8	7	2^{7}	8	3	5^{11}	2	6	11	C	358
5	(United Kingdom) Tom Gamble	4	6^{7}	2	**1**	5^{6}	DSQ	8	Ret	16	10	3^{5}	1	**2**	Ret	**2**	9	8	4	12	DSQ	16	2	15	C	346
6	(United Kingdom) Billy Monger	3	9^{5}	8	14	7^{5}	Ret	7	9^{2}	6	8	7^{3}	17	6	13	3	4	13	5	**4**	14^{1}	**3**	3	14	C	301
7	(Venezuela) Manuel Maldonado	11	1^{5}	10	5	6^{1}	4	17	1	14	12	16	7	4	11^{3}	4	8	7^{1}	7	7	Ret	8	4	13	C	292
8	(United Kingdom) Jamie Chadwick	8	3^{6}	7	9	10	Ret	13	13	7	5	9^{4}	13	12	5^{2}	12	12	1^{3}	11	10	12	4	9	8	C	260
9	(Thailand) Sasakorn Chaimongkol	10	11	11	13	15	8	11	3^{4}	9	14	10	14	10	2^{7}	10	10	4^{2}	10	18	4^{3}	10	10	7	C	242
10	(China) Sun Yueyang	6	13	Ret	6	11	7	9	12	12	13	2^{3}	11	9	7^{3}	9	5	12	13	20	1	9	12	5	C	240
11	(Germany) Jusuf Owega				8	16	Ret	12	6	10	7	15	8	8	9^{2}	5	11	6	9	9	Ret	12	7	10	C	187
12	(France) Tristan Charpentier	16	2	6	DNS	12^{7}	DNS	6	10^{2}	4	11	5^{2}	9	16	3	7										166
13	(United Kingdom) Jamie Caroline													11	1^{7}	6	**1**	Ret	2	2	8^{9}	DSQ				164
14	(United Kingdom) Jordan Cane	7	Ret	WD	3	8^{1}	5	4	Ret	8	3	8^{7}	5													159
15	(Singapore) Pavan Ravishankar	13	14	12	11	17	Ret	14	7	13	17	1	12	13	17	15	13	10	14	15	2^{1}	13	Ret	18	C	153
16	(Canada) Ben Hurst	15	12	14	12	19	10	16	8	15	16	13	16	17	14	13	16	Ret	12	17	13^{6}	17	15	2	C	137
17	(Sweden) Arvin Esmaeili	14	10	13	Ret	13^{1}	Ret	15	5	17	15	12	15	15	16	14	14	5	Ret	14	Ret	Ret	14	3	C	122
18	(France) Clément Novalak	**Ret**	7^{10}	4	Ret	9^{6}	DSQ				4	11^{3}	6										13	4	C	120
19	(United Kingdom) Ayrton Simmons													18	4	Ret				6	6^{7}	7	5	12	C	88
20	(United Kingdom) Josh Mason				Ret	18	9							14	15	Ret	15	14^{2}	15	16	7	14	16	1	C	82
21	(Sweden) Hampus Ericsson																			13	3^{2}	5	8	9	C	64
22	(United Kingdom) Harry Webb							5	11^{2}	5																45
23	(Belgium) Max Defourny													Ret	DNS	DNS				11	11	6				32
24	(Malaysia) Chia Wing Hoong	12	Ret	Ret	10	14	DSQ																			22
25	(Republic of Ireland) Cian Carey																			19	9^{11}	Ret				20

Colour	Result
Gold	Winner
Silver	Second place
Bronze	Third place
Green	Points classification
Blue	Non-points classification
Blue	Non-classified finish (NC)
Purple	Retired, not classified (Ret)
Red	Did not qualify (DNQ)
Red	Did not pre-qualify (DNPQ)
Black	Disqualified (DSQ)
White	Did not start (DNS)
White	Withdrew (WD)
White	Race cancelled (C)
Blank	Did not practice (DNP)
Blank	Did not arrive (DNA)
Blank	Excluded (EX)

**Bold** – Pole
Italics – Fastest Lap
