= Tom Gamble (racing driver) =

British racing driver (born 2001)

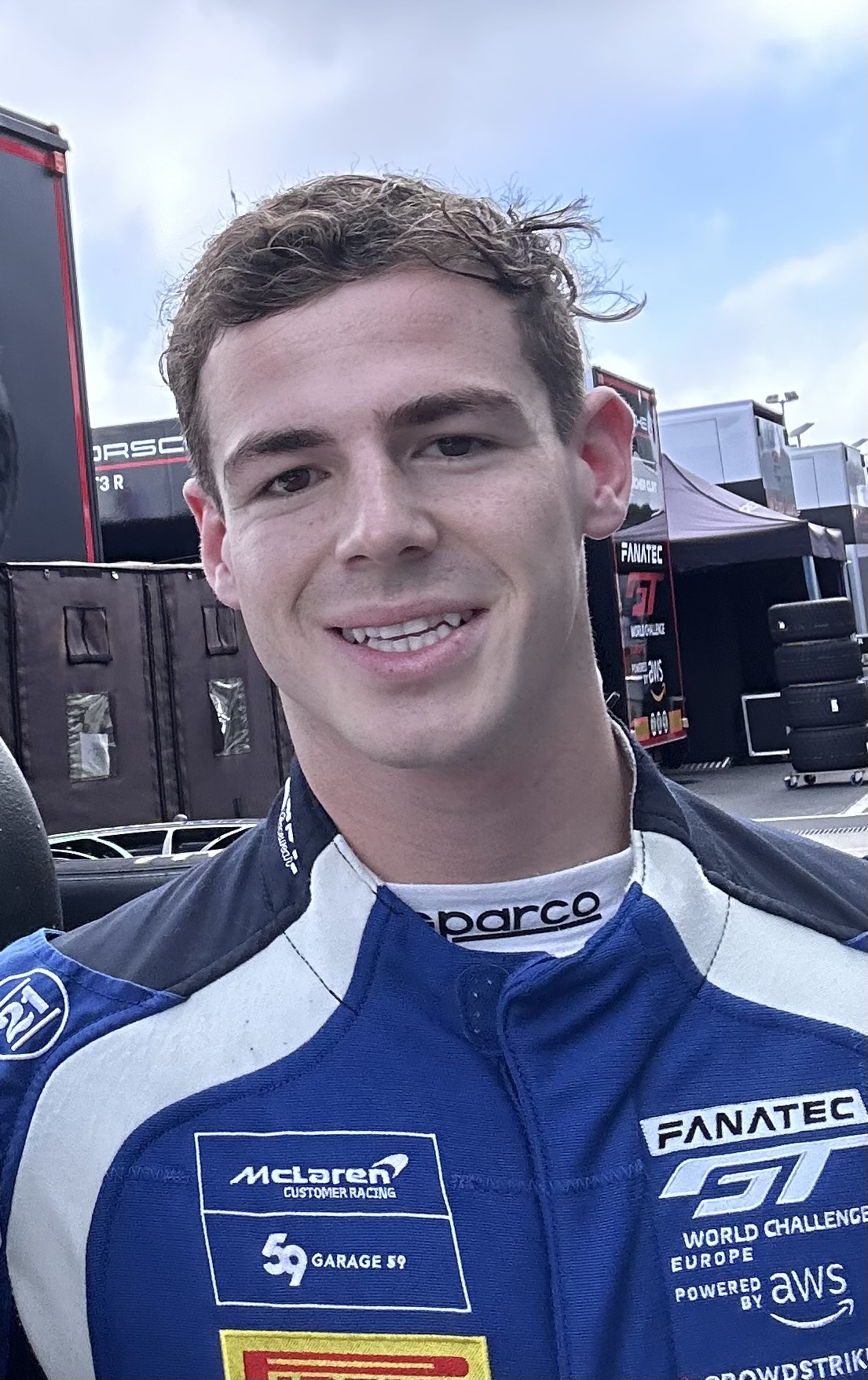
- Gamble in 2024
- Nationality: (United Kingdom) British
- Born: Tom Jamie Gamble; 7 November 2001 (age 25) Epperstone, England
- Relatives: George Gamble (brother)

FIA World Endurance Championship career
- Debut season: 2021
- Current team: Aston Martin THOR Team
- Categorisation: FIA Silver (until 2021); FIA Gold (2022–)
- Car number: 007
- Starts: 21
- Wins: 0
- Podiums: 0
- Poles: 0
- Fastest laps: 0
- Best finish: 15th in 2021(LMGTE Am)

Previous series
- 2020–2022 2020–2022 2019 2018 2016–2017: European Le Mans Series; Asian Le Mans Series; GT World Challenge Europe; BRDC British F3 Championship; Ginetta Junior Championship

Championship titles
- 2020 2017: European Le Mans Series - LMP3; Ginetta Junior Championship

Awards
- 2018: Autosport BRDC Award

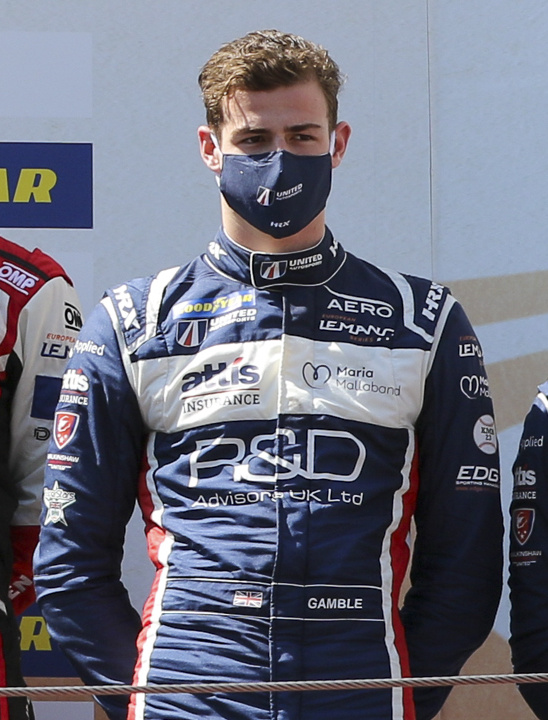
Gamble on the ELMS podium at Barcelona in 2021.

Tom Jamie Gamble (born 7 November 2001) is a British racing driver who currently races for Aston Martin THOR Team in the FIA World Endurance Championship. He is a Ginetta Junior champion, a BRDC British Formula 3 race winner, and has previously competed in the FIA World Endurance Championship. He won the Autosport BRDC Award in 2018, for which he received a prize Formula One test with McLaren. Five years later, in 2023, Gamble joined McLaren as a factory driver.

Gamble's elder brothers George and Harry are also racing drivers.

== Racing record ==
=== Racing career summary ===
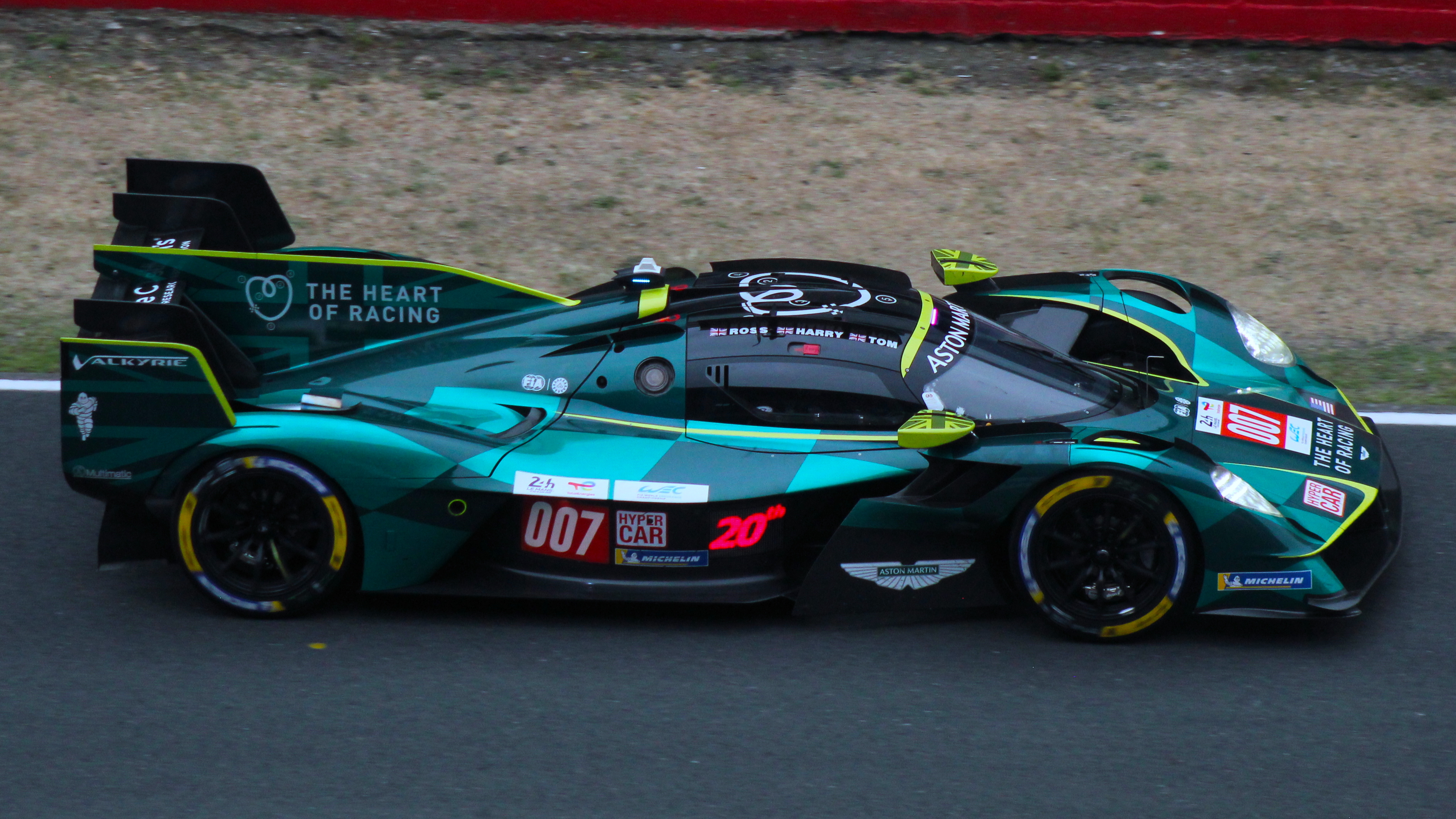
Gamble's No. 007 car at the 2025 24 Hours of Le Mans

Season	Series	Team	Races	Wins	Poles	F/Laps	Podiums	Points	Position
2016	Ginetta Junior Championship	HHC Motorsport	14	0	0	0	0	160	15th
2016	Ginetta Junior Winter Series	JHR Developments	4	0	0	0	1	78	5th
2017	Ginetta Junior Championship	JHR Developments	17	4	0	0	10	654	**1st**
2017	Ginetta Junior Championship	Elite Motorsport	8	4	0	4	7	654	**1st**
2018	BRDC British Formula 3 Championship	Fortec Motorsports	23	2	3	7	7	346	5th
2019	Blancpain GT World Challenge Europe	Belgian Audi Club Team WRT	10	0	0	0	0	4.5	21st
2019	Blancpain GT World Challenge Europe - Silver Cup	Belgian Audi Club Team WRT	10	0	0	0	3	64	6th
2019	British GT Championship - GT3	Century Motorsport	2	0	1	0	0	2	22nd
2019	Le Mans Cup - GT3	TF Sport	2	0	0	0	0	0	NC†
2019–20	Asian Le Mans Series - GT	D'station Racing AMR	1	0	0	0	0	0	18th
2020	European Le Mans Series - LMP3	United Autosports	5	3	0	2	4	94	**1st**
2021	FIA World Endurance Championship - GTE Am	GR Racing	6	0	0	0	0	23	15th
2021	24 Hours of Le Mans - GTE Am	GR Racing	1	0	0	0	0	N/A	14th
2021	European Le Mans Series - LMP2	United Autosports	6	1	0	0	4	86	**2nd**
2021	IMSA SportsCar Championship - LMP3	United Autosports	1	0	0	0	0	285	27th
2021	Asian Le Mans Series - GT	D'station Racing	4	0	0	0	0	13	11th
2022	European Le Mans Series - LMP2	United Autosports	6	1	0	0	2	73	4th
2022	Asian Le Mans Series - GT	D'station Racing	4	0	0	0	0	5.5	12th
2022	IMSA SportsCar Championship - GTD	Heart of Racing Team	2	0	0	0	0	409	43rd
2022	IMSA SportsCar Championship - GTD Pro	Heart of Racing Team	1	0	0	0	0	312	25th
2023	Asian Le Mans Series - GT	Garage 59	2	0	0	0	0	12	11th
2023	GT World Challenge Europe Endurance Cup	Optimum Motorsport	1	0	0	0	0	7	21st
2023	GT World Challenge Europe Endurance Cup - Gold Cup	Optimum Motorsport	1	1	1	1	1	43	9th
2023	British GT Championship - GT4	Paddock Motorsport	1	0	0	0	0	9	19th
2023	24 Hours of Le Mans - LMP2	Racing Team Turkey	1	0	0	0	0	N/A	DNF
2023–24	Asian Le Mans Series - GT	Optimum Motorsport	5	0	0	0	0	22	13th
2024	British GT Championship - GT3	Optimum Motorsport	9	0	0	2	3	86.5	5th
2024	IMSA SportsCar Championship - GTD	Inception Racing	1	0	0	0	0	201	64th
2024	GT World Challenge Europe Endurance Cup	Garage 59	5	0	0	0	0	2	30th
2024	GT World Challenge Europe Sprint Cup	Garage 59	10	0	0	0	1	36.5	6th
2024–25	Asian Le Mans Series - GT	Optimum Motorsport	2	0	0	0	0	0	27th
2025	FIA World Endurance Championship - Hypercar	Aston Martin THOR Team	8	0	0	0	0	0	30th
2025	IMSA SportsCar Championship - GTD	Heart of Racing Team	8	1	2	2	4	2404	11th
2026	IMSA SportsCar Championship - GTD	Heart of Racing Team	8	0	2	1	3	2217	10th
2026	FIA World Endurance Championship - Hypercar	Aston Martin THOR Team	8	0	0	0	0	42	16th

^{†} As Gamble was a guest driver, he was ineligible to score points.

=== Complete BRDC British Formula 3 Championship results ===
(key) (Races in bold indicate pole position) (Races in italics indicate fastest lap)

Year	Team	1	2	3	4	5	6	7	8	9	10	11	12	13	14	15	16	17	18	19	20	21	22	23	24	Pos	Points
2018	Fortec Motorsports	OUL; 1; 4	OUL; 2; 6^{7}	OUL; 3; 2	**ROC**; **1**; 1	ROC; 2; 5^{6}	ROC; 3 DSQ	SNE; 1; 8	SNE; 2 Ret	SNE; 3; 16	SIL; 1; 10	SIL; 2; 3^{5}	SIL; 3; 1	**SPA**; **1**; 2	SPA; 2 Ret	**SPA**; **3**; 2	BRH; 1; 9	BRH; 2; 8	BRH; 3; 4	DON; 1; 12	DON; 2 DSQ	DON; 3; 16	SIL; 1; 2	SIL; 2; 15	SIL; 3 C	5th	346

=== Complete GT World Challenge Europe results ===
==== GT World Challenge Europe Sprint Cup ====
(key) (Races in bold indicate pole position; results in italics indicate fastest lap)

Year	Team	Car	Class	1	2	3	4	5	6	7	8	9	10	Pos.	Points
2019	Belgian Audi Club Team WRT	Audi R8 LMS	Silver	BRH; 1; 6	BRH; 2 Ret	MIS; 1; 14	MIS; 2; 11	ZAN; 1; 17	ZAN; 2; 11	NÜR; 1; 12	NÜR; 2; 17	HUN; 1; 20	HUN; 2; 18	5th	75
2024	Garage 59	McLaren 720S GT3 Evo	Pro	BRH; 1; 5	BRH; 2; 6	MIS; 1; 8	MIS; 2; 6	HOC; 1; 9	HOC; 2; 8	MAG; 1; 9	MAG; 2; 5	CAT; 1; 8	CAT; 2; 3	6th	36.5

==== GT World Challenge Europe Endurance Cup ====
(key) (Races in bold indicate pole position; results in italics indicate fastest lap)

Year	Team	Car	Class	1	2	3	4	5	6	7	Pos.	Points
2023	Optimum Motorsport	McLaren 720S GT3	Gold	MNZ	LEC	SPA; 6H; 31	SPA; 12H; 4	**SPA**; **24H**; 10	NÜR	CAT	11th	27
2024	Garage 59	McLaren 720S GT3 Evo	Pro	LEC; Ret	SPA; 6H; 35	SPA; 12H; 29	SPA; 24H; 11	NÜR; 14	MNZ; 14	JED; 9	30th	2

=== Complete British GT Championship results ===
(key) (Races in bold indicate pole position) (Races in italics indicate fastest lap)

Year	Team	Car	Class	1	2	3	4	5	6	7	8	9	DC	Points
2019	Century Motorsport	BMW M6 GT3	GT3	OUL; 1	OUL; 2	**SNE**; **1**; 11	SNE; 2; 9	SIL; 1	DON; 1	SPA; 1	BRH; 1	DON; 1	22nd	2
2023	Paddock Motorsport	McLaren Artura GT4	GT4	OUL; 1	OUL; 2	SIL; 1	DON; 1	SNE; 1	SNE; 2	ALG; 1	BRH; 1	DON; 1; 21	19th	9
2024	Optimum Motorsport	McLaren 720S GT3 Evo	GT3	OUL; 1; 4	OUL; 2; 2	SIL; 1 Ret	DON; 1; 2	SPA; 1; 7	SNE; 1; 8	SNE; 2; 3	DON; 1 Ret	BRH; 1; 12	5th	86.5

=== Complete Asian Le Mans Series results ===
(key) (Races in bold indicate pole position; results in italics indicate fastest lap)

Year	Entrant	Class	Chassis	Engine	1	2	3	4	5	6	Rank	Points
2019–20	D'station Racing AMR	GT	Aston Martin Vantage AMR GT3	Aston Martin M177 4.0 L Turbo V8	SHA	BEN	SEP	CHA; Ret			18th	0
2021	D'station Racing	GT	Aston Martin Vantage AMR GT3	Aston Martin M177 4.0 L Turbo V8	DUB; 1; 13	DUB; 2; 13	ABU; 1; 7	ABU; 2; 7			11th	13
2022	D'station Racing	GT	Aston Martin Vantage AMR GT3	Aston Martin M177 4.0 L Turbo V8	DUB; 1; 17	DUB; 2; 10	ABU; 1; 8	ABU; 2 Ret			12th	5.5
2023	Garage 59	GT	McLaren 720S GT3	McLaren M840T 4.0 L Turbo V8	DUB; 1; 15	DUB; 2; 4	ABU; 1	ABU; 2			11th	12
2023–24	Optimum Motorsport	GT	McLaren 720S GT3 Evo	McLaren M840T 4.0 L Turbo V8	SEP; 1; 13	SEP; 2; 5	DUB; Ret	ABU; 1; 4	ABU; 2; 11		13th	22
2024–25	Optimum Motorsport	GT	McLaren 720S GT3 Evo	McLaren M840T 4.0 L Turbo V8	SEP; 1; 12	SEP; 2; 14	DUB; 1	DUB; 2	ABU; 1	ABU; 2	27th	0

=== Complete European Le Mans Series results ===
(key) (Races in bold indicate pole position; results in italics indicate fastest lap)

Year	Entrant	Class	Chassis	Engine	1	2	3	4	5	6	Rank	Points
2020	United Autosports	LMP3	Ligier JS P320	Nissan VK56DE 5.6 L V8	LEC; 1	SPA; 1	LEC; Ret	MNZ; 3	ALG; 1		1st	94
2021	United Autosports	LMP2	Oreca 07	Gibson GK428 4.2 L V8	CAT; 3	RBR; 7	LEC; 2	MNZ; 2	SPA; 8	ALG; 1	2nd	86
2022	United Autosports	LMP2	Oreca 07	Gibson GK428 4.2 L V8	LEC; 7	IMO; 2	MNZ; 4	CAT; 4	SPA; 1	ALG; Ret	4th	73

=== Complete FIA World Endurance Championship results ===
(key) (Races in bold indicate pole position) (Races in italics indicate fastest lap)

Year	Entrant	Class	Car	Engine	1	2	3	4	5	6	7	8	Rank	Points
2021	GR Racing	LMGTE Am	Porsche 911 RSR-19	Porsche 4.2 L Flat-6	SPA; Ret	ALG; 8	MNZ; 8	LMS; 9	FUJ; 6	BHR; 9			15th	23
2025	Aston Martin THOR Team	Hypercar	Aston Martin Valkyrie AMR-LMH	Aston Martin RA 6.5 L V12	QAT; Ret	IMO; 18	SPA; 13	LMS; 13	SÃO; 16	COA; Ret	FUJ; Ret	BHR; 15	30th	0
2026	Aston Martin THOR Team	Hypercar	Aston Martin Valkyrie AMR-LMH	Aston Martin RA 6.5 L V12	IMO; 9	SPA; 4	LMS; 8	SÃO; 6	COA; 4	FUJ; 14	CAT; Ret	MNZ; 12	16th	42

=== Complete IMSA SportsCar Championship results ===
(key) (Races in bold indicate pole position; results in italics indicate fastest lap)

Year	Team	Class	Make	Engine	1	2	3	4	5	6	7	8	9	10	11	12	Pos.	Points
2021	United Autosports	LMP3	Ligier JS P320	Nissan VK56DE 5.6 L V8	DAY	SEB	MDO	WGL	WGL	ELK	PET; 6						16th	571
2022	Heart of Racing Team	GTD	Aston Martin Vantage AMR GT3	Aston Martin AMR16A 4.0 L Turbo V8	DAY; 9	SEB; 15	LBH	LGA	MDO	DET	WGL	MOS	LIM	ELK	VIR		43rd	409
2022	Heart of Racing Team	GTD Pro	Aston Martin Vantage AMR GT3	Aston Martin AMR16A 4.0 L Turbo V8												PET; 4	27th	285
2024	Inception Racing	GTD	McLaren 720S GT3 Evo	McLaren M840T 4.0 L Turbo V8	DAY; 13	SEB	LBH	LGA	WGL	MOS	ELK	VIR	IMS	PET			64th	201
2025	Heart of Racing Team	GTD	Aston Martin Vantage AMR GT3 Evo	Aston Martin AMR16A 4.0 L Turbo V8	DAY; 3	SEB; 3	LBH; 9	LGA	**WGL**; 1	MOS	ELK; 9	VIR; 3	**IMS**; 11	PET; 4			11th	2404
2026	Heart of Racing Team	GTD	Aston Martin Vantage AMR GT3 Evo	Aston Martin AMR16A 4.0 L Turbo V8	**DAY**; 3	**SEB**; 2	LBH	LGA; 2	WGL; 5	MOS	ELK; 15	VIR; 4	IMS; 5	PET; 17			10th	2217

=== Complete 24 Hours of Le Mans results ===
Year	Team	Co-Drivers	Car	Class	Laps	Pos.	Class Pos.
2021	(United Kingdom) GR Racing	(United Kingdom) Ben Barker (United Kingdom) Michael Wainwright	Porsche 911 RSR-19	GTE Am	322	43rd	14th
2023	Racing Team Turkey	(Belgium) Dries Vanthoor (Turkey) Salih Yoluç	Oreca 07-Gibson	LMP2	87	DNF	DNF
2023	Racing Team Turkey	(Belgium) Dries Vanthoor (Turkey) Salih Yoluç	Oreca 07-Gibson	LMP2 Pro-Am	87	DNF	DNF
2025	(United States) Aston Martin THOR Team	(United Kingdom) Ross Gunn (United Kingdom) Harry Tincknell	Aston Martin Valkyrie	Hypercar	381	14th	14th
2026	(United States) Aston Martin THOR Team	(United Kingdom) Ross Gunn (United Kingdom) Harry Tincknell	Aston Martin Valkyrie	Hypercar	379	8th	8th

Sporting positions
Preceded by Will Tregurtha	Ginetta Junior Championship; Champion; 2017	Succeeded by Adam Smalley
Preceded by Mikkel Jensen; Jens Petersen	European Le Mans Series; LMP3 Champion; 2020; With: Wayne Boyd & Robert Wheldon	Succeeded by Laurents Hörr
Awards and achievements
Preceded by Dan Ticktum	Autosport BRDC Award; Winner; 2018	Succeeded by Johnathan Hoggard
