= Arjun Maini =

Indian racing driver (born 1997)

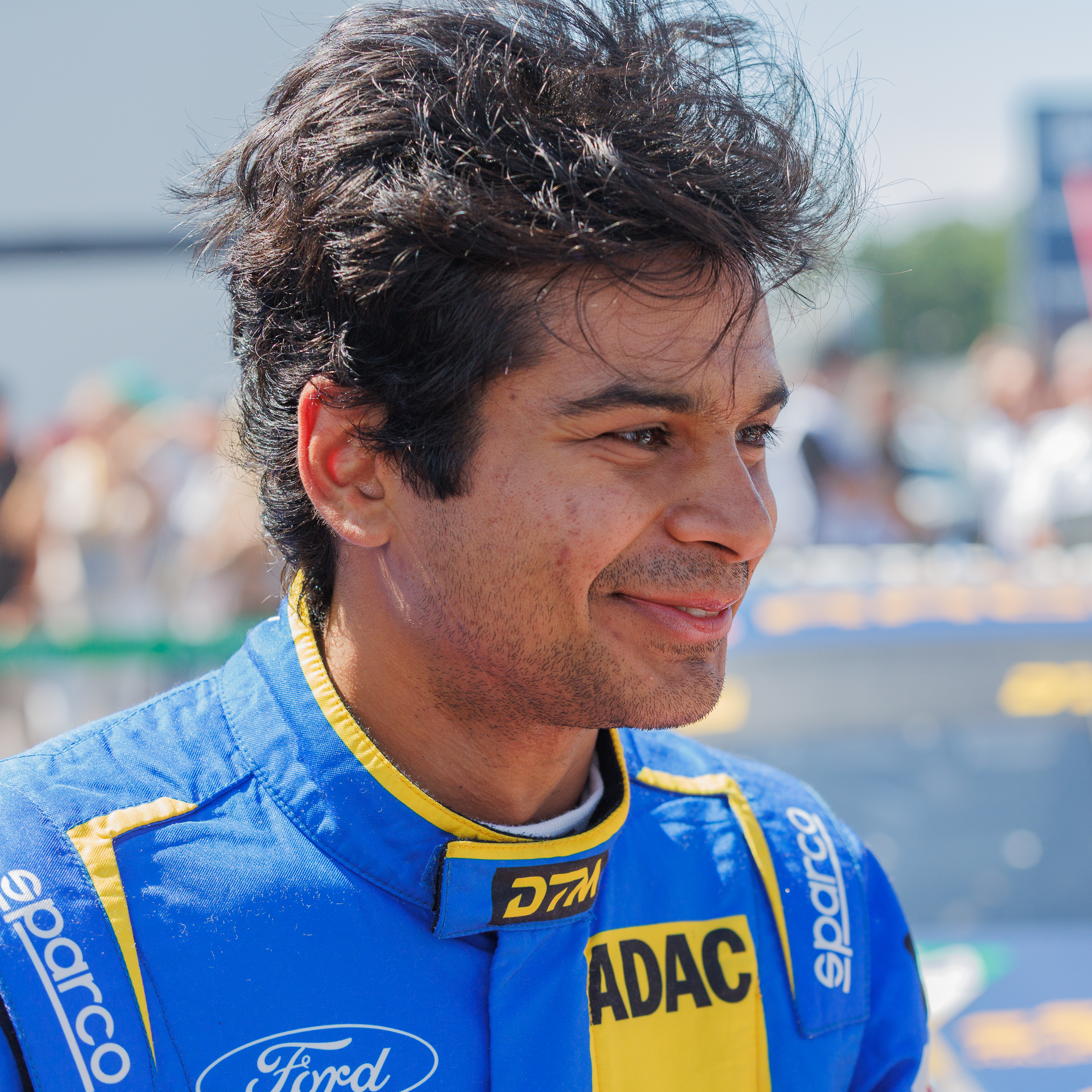
- Maini in 2026
- Nationality: (India) Indian
- Born: 10 December 1997 (age 28) Bangalore, India
- Relatives: Kush Maini (brother); Chetan Maini (uncle)

Deutsche Tourenwagen Masters career
- Debut season: 2021
- Current team: HRT Ford Performance
- Categorisation: FIA Silver (until 2019); FIA Gold (2020–)
- Car number: 36
- Former teams: GetSpeed
- Starts: 94 (96 entries)
- Wins: 0
- Podiums: 5
- Poles: 2
- Fastest laps: 2
- Best finish: 7th in 2024

GTWC Europe Endurance Cup career
- Debut season: 2022
- Current team: HRT Ford Performance
- Car number: 64
- Starts: 21
- Wins: 3
- Podiums: 11
- Poles: 0
- Fastest laps: 0
- Best finish: 2nd in 2024 (Bronze Cup)

Previous series
- 2018–19 2016–17 2015–16: FIA Formula 2 Championship; GP3 Series; FIA Formula 3 European Championship

Arjun Maini (born 10 December 1997) is an Indian professional racing driver, currently competing in the Deutsche Tourenwagen Masters, and in the GT World Challenge Europe for Haupt Racing Team. He is currently a Ford Factory driver. He was the winner of Force India's 'One in a Billion' driver hunt in 2011.

== Early life ==
Maini comes from a family of racers. His brother Kush is also a racer competing in the FIA Formula 2 Championship with ART Grand Prix, and his father, Gautam, raced in the National Racing Championship in the late 1990s, at the Formula India Single Seater Maruti Engine. The teenager first fell in love with motorsport when his father gave him an electric car. Maini received his first go-kart, an 80cc Comer Kart at the age of five.

Maini's uncle Chetan Maini is an Indian business magnate best known for building India's first electric car, REVA, and as the Founder of Reva Electric Car Company Ltd, now Mahindra Electric Mobility Limited, where he served as an advisor.

Maini idolises Sebastian Vettel and in his free time enjoys wrestling, cycling, fitness activities and video editing.

== Junior career ==
=== Karting ===
Maini received his first go-kart, an 80cc Comer Kart, at the age of five. At the young age of eight, Maini won his first two championships, the MRF Mini Max Championship in both the Rotax class and the 4-stroke Cadet class in his first year of racing. After his first titles, Maini raced on foreign soil for the first time in the Asia Max championship, which led to immediate success. In 2008, Maini became the youngest Indian to win a kart race abroad by winning the Malaysian Royal Kelantan Kart Prix held in 2008.

Maini was the youngest driver to take part in the J.K. Tyre Rotax Max Junior Max National championship at the age of 11. He was selected by the Red Rooster Racing Team in 2009. He then took part in the Rotax Max Challenge India - Junior in 2010 and finished in second place, with the highest number of fastest laps. Maini's major breakthrough came in 2011 where he won the J.K.Tyre Rotax Max National Karting Championship title in the Junior Max category and followed this up by becoming the Sahara Force India team's One from a Billion winner. He was also the winner of AKOC race in Macau as well as the Ask KF3 Race in Elite, Malaysia. He finished second overall in the AKS Malaysian Championship 2011.

In his penultimate year of karting, Maini finished a creditable fifth in the ROK Cup International Final in Junior ROK category. Maini was awarded the best rookie at Rowrah while racing in the MSA British Karting Championship. He also finished in second place in Junior category in the Indonesia Kart Prix 2012 along with first place in the Junior max category in Rotax Invitational Karting Race held at Kuala Lumpur.

=== Lower formulas ===
Maini then stepped up into cars in 2013. He finished runner up in the J.K.Tyre Racing Series championship, winning two races at the Buddh International Circuit as well as winning the Malaysian Super 6 Series. He also competed in the WSK Euro and Master karting in the KF category.

In 2014, Maini then went on to compete in the BRDC Formula 4 championship; finishing second overall and missing out on the championship by three points to teammate George Russell. He finished the championship with eight wins and nine podium finishes. He was also the highest ranked Indian driver in the Driver Database

At the beginning of 2015, Maini showed remarkable pace in the Toyota Racing Series in New Zealand en route to a fourth overall in the championship with two wins, five podiums and three poles. He also finished fourth overall in Race 2 of the Pau Grand Prix. However, a learning year in the FIA European Formula 3 series meant he could only manage 18th overall and ninth in the rookie class. Maini did manage to end the season on a high, finishing tenth at the Macau Grand Prix.

=== GP3 Series ===
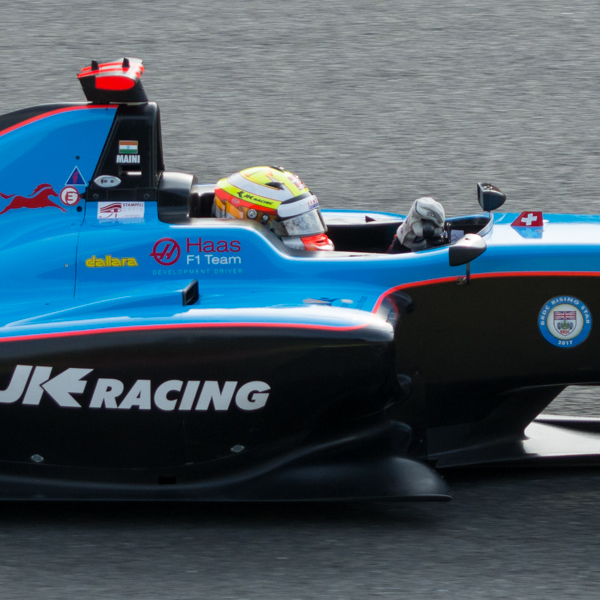
Maini at the GP3 race at the 2017 Belgian GP

==== 2016 ====
In 2016, Maini raced for Jenzer Motorsport in the GP3 series, he finished the season in tenth position in the championship despite missing the first four races. He also became the first Indian to secure a podium in the GP3 series at Hungaroring, after finishing second. Maini also raced in the Macau GP for Team Motopark.

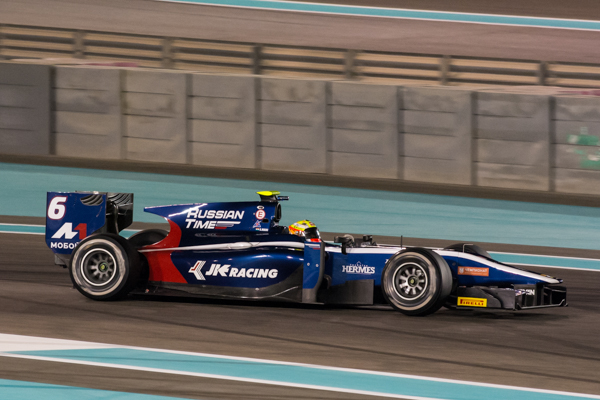
Maini with the Russian Time team at the Abu Dhabi F2 post season test

==== 2017 ====
Maini signed for Jenzer again in 2017, for his second stint in the GP3 Series. He scored two podiums, including a victory in the sprint race at Circuit de Barcelona-Catalunya, and ended up 9th in the championship, two positions behind teammate Alessio Lorandi.

=== FIA Formula 2 Championship ===
At the end of 2017, Maini took part in a post season test in Abu Dhabi with F2 teams Trident and Russian Time.

==== 2018 ====
Maini signed for Trident Racing in the 2018 FIA Formula 2 Championship, partnering with fellow Haas F1 Team development driver Santino Ferrucci.

While driving in a race at Circuit Paul Ricard, Maini said over the radio that the car lacked power and tearfully claimed people didn't believe him and didn't support him, and that Formula 2 was not providing good equipment. The Trident team analyzed data and agreed and approached F2, and Maini was given a new engine shortly after.

Later that season, teammate Ferrucci ran Maini off the track in a race at Silverstone Circuit and then crashed into the back of Maini's car later in the same race after the checkered flag had been waved, both of which were found to be deliberate actions, and Trident apologized to Maini. Ferrucci also "appeared to mock" Maini on Twitter over Maini's rant about the car's power.

Ferrucci was banned for several races and was fired by Trident shortly thereafter, due to these incidents and others.

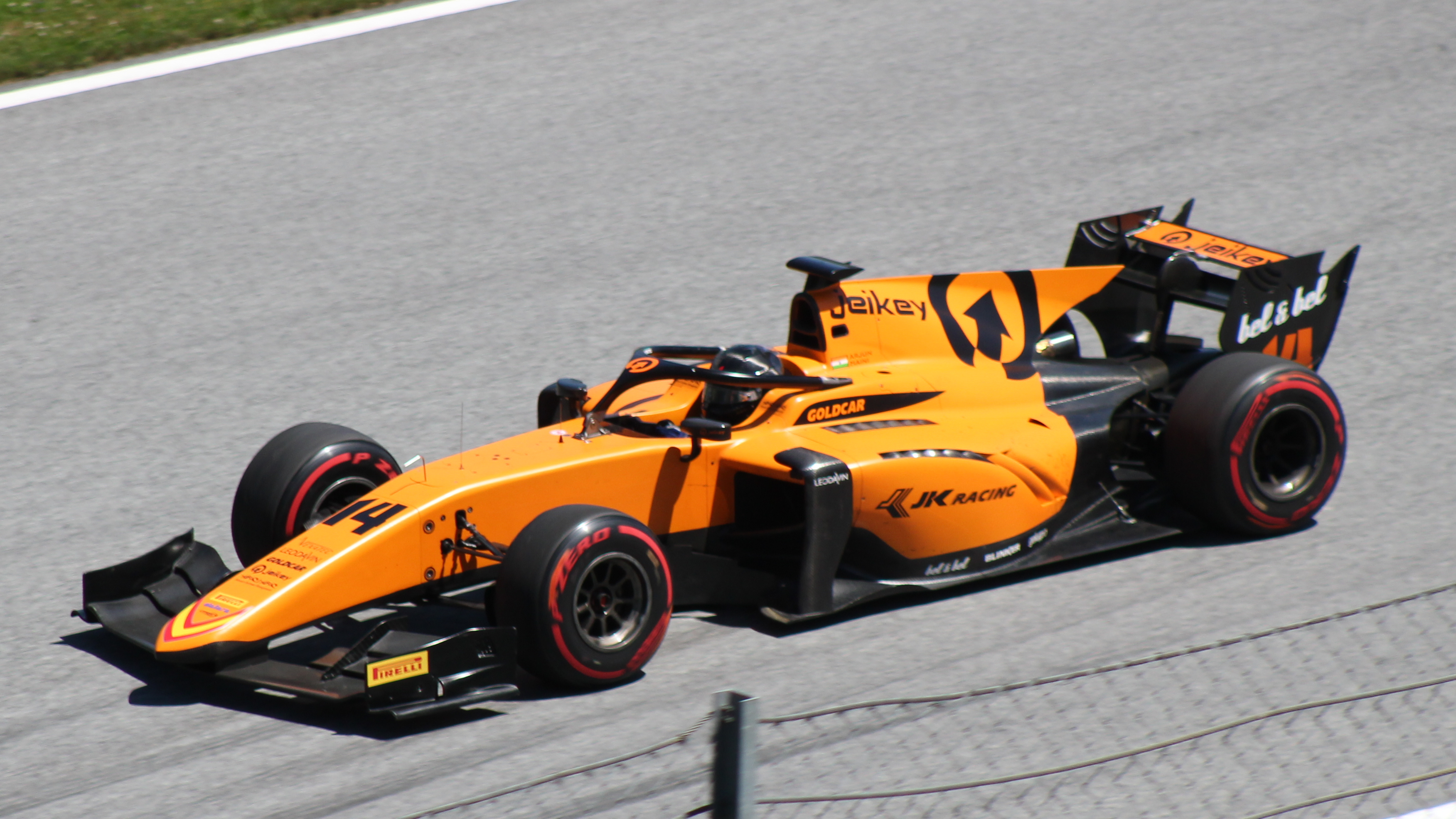
Maini with Campos Racing at the 2019 Spielberg Formula 2 round, replacing Dorian Boccolacci

==== 2019 ====
Maini replaced Dorian Boccolacci at Campos Racing in the 2019 FIA Formula 2 Championship at Spielberg. He raced in six races, scoring no points, before being replaced by Marino Sato.

== Formula One ==
In May 2017, it was announced that the Haas F1 Team signed Maini as a development driver. He remained in his role throughout 2018.

== Endurance racing ==
Maini changed from single seaters to Endurance racing in the European Le Mans Series with RLR M SPORT. He also competed in the prestigious 2019 24 Hours of Le Mans as well as competing in the Asian Le Mans Series where he won the first race at Shanghai International Circuit.

== DTM ==
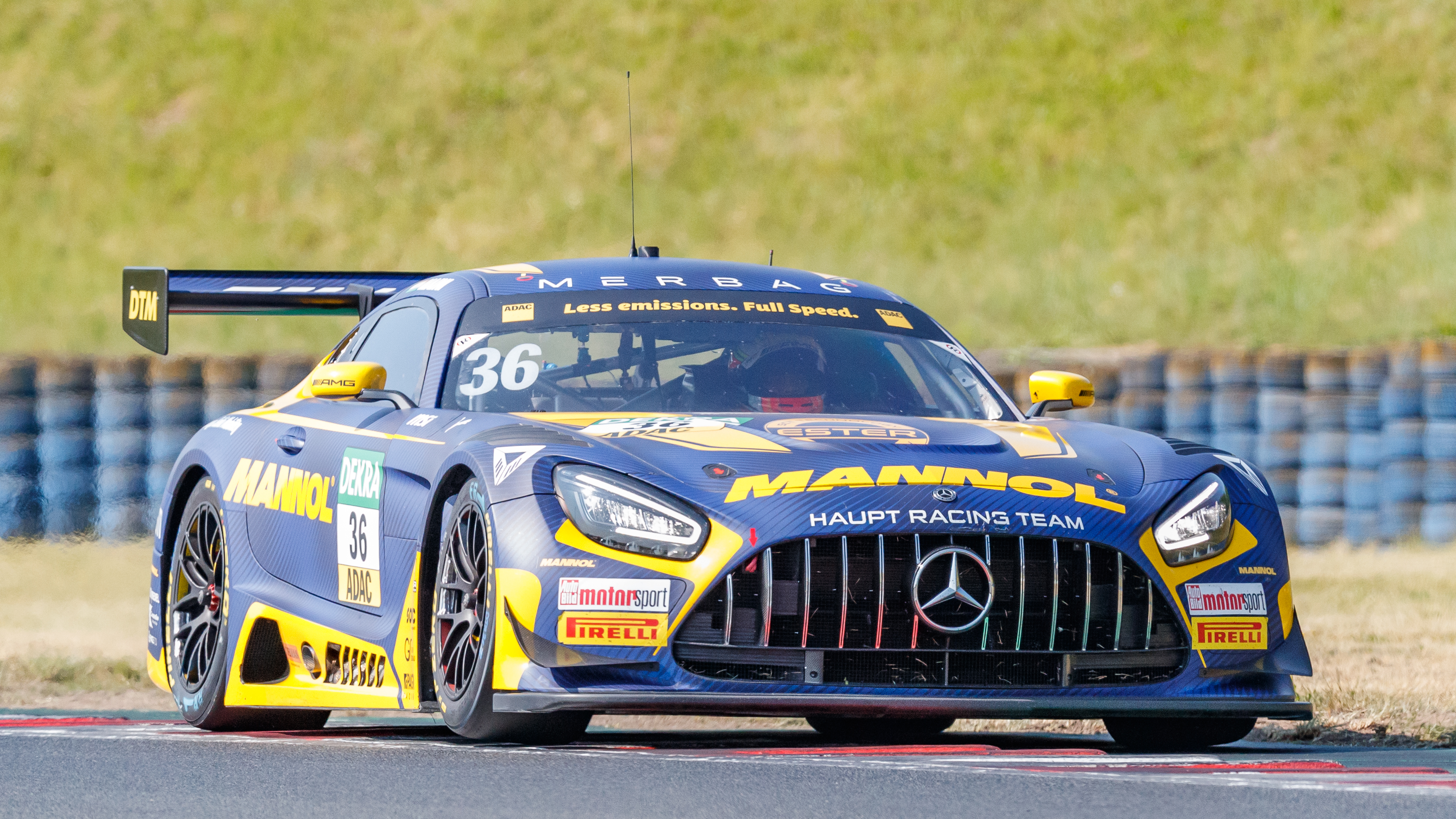
Maini in his No. 36 Team HRT Mercedes-AMG GT3 Evo at the Oschersleben in 2023

In 2021, Maini joined the Deutsche Tourenwagen Masters driving for Mercedes-AMG Team GetSpeed. He picked up his first podium finish in the series at the Norisring. This was also the first podium finish by an Indian in the history of the series. He switched to Mercedes-AMG Haupt Racing Team for the 2022 season, achieving two fourth-place finishes. He stayed with the team for 2023.

== Karting record ==
=== Karting career summary ===
Season	Series	Team	Position
2010	Rotax Max Challenge India — Junior		2nd
2011	ROK Cup International Final — Junior ROK		19th
2011	National Rotax Max Championship India — Junior		1st
2011	Asian Karting Open Championship — Formula 125 Junior Open		8th
2012	Trofeo delle Industrie — KF3	Baby Race	NC
2012	ROK Cup International Final — Junior ROK		5th
2012	CIK-FIA Academy Trophy		38th
2013	WSK Super Master Series — KFJ		41st
2013	Andrea Margutti Trophy — KFJ		17th

== Racing record ==
=== Racing career summary ===
Season	Series	Team	Races	Wins	Poles	F/Laps	Podiums	Points	Position
2013	AsiaCup Series	Meritus.GP	12	0	?	1	4	108	4th
2013	JK Racing India Series	EuroInternational	12	2	4	3	10	198	**2nd**
2014	BRDC Formula 4 Championship	Lanan Racing	24	4	0	6	9	480	**2nd**
2015	FIA Formula 3 European Championship	Van Amersfoort Racing	33	0	0	0	0	27	18th
2015	Macau Grand Prix	T-Sport	1	0	0	0	0	N/A	10th
2015	Toyota Racing Series	M2 Competition	16	2	3	2	5	732	4th
2016	GP3 Series	Jenzer Motorsport	14	0	0	0	1	50	10th
2016	FIA Formula 3 European Championship	Threebond with T-Sport	12	0	0	0	0	3	21st
2017	GP3 Series	Jenzer Motorsport	15	1	0	1	2	69	9th
2017	Formula One	Haas F1 Team	Development driver						
2018	FIA Formula 2 Championship	Trident	23	0	0	0	0	24	16th
2018	Formula One	Haas F1 Team	Development driver						
2019	FIA Formula 2 Championship	Campos Racing	6	0	0	0	0	0	24th
2019	European Le Mans Series - LMP2	RLR MSport	6	0	0	0	0	5.5	21st
2019	Macau Grand Prix	Jenzer Motorsport	1	0	0	0	0	N/A	23rd
2019	24 Hours of Le Mans - LMP2	RLR M Sport/Tower Events	1	0	0	0	0	N/A	NC
2019–20	Asian Le Mans Series - LMP2	RLR MSport	2	1	1	2	1	26	5th
2020	European Le Mans Series - LMP2	Algarve Pro Racing	2	0	0	0	0	8	22nd
2021	Deutsche Tourenwagen Masters	Mercedes-AMG Team Getspeed	15	0	0	0	1	48	12th
2021	Asian Le Mans Series - LMP2	Racing Team India	4	0	0	0	0	42	6th
2022	Deutsche Tourenwagen Masters	Mercedes-AMG Team HRT	15	0	0	0	0	24	19th
2022	Asian Le Mans Series - GT	Bilstein Haupt Racing Team	4	0	0	0	0	16	9th
2022	GT World Challenge Europe Endurance Cup	Haupt Racing Team	5	0	0	0	S	0	NC
2022	GT World Challenge Europe Endurance Cup - Gold	Haupt Racing Team	5	0	0	0	2	56	5th
2022	Nürburgring Langstrecken-Serie - SP9	Haupt Racing Team	1	0	0	0	0	0	NC†
2022	Nürburgring Langstrecken-Serie - V6	Team Mathol Racing e.V.	0	0	1	0	0	0	NC†
2022	Nürburgring Langstrecken-Serie - VT3	Team Mathol Racing e.V.	0	0	0	0	0	0	NC†
2023	Deutsche Tourenwagen Masters	Mercedes-AMG Team HRT	16	0	0	0	0	30	20th
2023	Asian Le Mans Series - GT	Haupt Racing Team	4	0	0	0	0	6	15th
2023	GT World Challenge Europe Endurance Cup	Haupt Racing Team	5	0	0	0	0	0	NC
2023	GT World Challenge Europe Endurance Cup - Bronze Cup	Haupt Racing Team	5	1	0	0	3	89	**2nd**
2023	ADAC GT Masters	Haupt Racing Team	4	0	1	0	1	41	13th
2023	Nürburgring Langstrecken-Serie - SP9	Haupt Racing Team	3	0	0	0	0	0	NC†
2023	24 Hours of Nürburgring - SP9	Mercedes-AMG Team Bilstein by HRT	1	0	0	0	0	N/A	8th
2024	Deutsche Tourenwagen Masters	Mercedes-AMG Team HRT	16	0	1	0	3	139	7th
2024	GT World Challenge Europe Endurance Cup	Haupt Racing Team	5	0	0	0	0	0	NC
2024	GT World Challenge Europe Endurance Cup - Gold Cup	Haupt Racing Team	5	1	0	0	4	95	**3rd**
2024	Nürburgring Langstrecken-Serie - SP9	Mercedes-AMG Team Bilstein by HRT	2	0	0	0	0	*	*
2024	Nürburgring Langstrecken-Serie - SP9	Team ADVAN x HRT	2	0	0	1	1	*	*
2024	24 Hours of Nürburgring - SP9	Mercedes-AMG Team Bilstein by HRT	1	0	0	0	0	N/A	11th
2024	Intercontinental GT Challenge	Mercedes-AMG Team Bilstein by HRT	1	0	0	0	0	12	18th
2024	Intercontinental GT Challenge	Haupt Racing Team	1	0	0	0	0	12	18th
2024	Intercontinental GT Challenge	Triple Eight JMR	1	0	0	0	0	12	18th
2024	GT World Challenge America - Pro-Am	Triple Eight JMR	1	0	0	0	0	0	NC†
2025	Deutsche Tourenwagen Masters	HRT Ford Performance	16	0	0	0	0	62	15th
2025	Nürburgring Langstrecken-Serie - SP9	HRT Ford Performance	0	0	0	0	0	0	NC
2025	24 Hours of Nürburgring - SP9	HRT Ford Performance	1	0	0	0	0	N/A	DNF
2025	GT World Challenge Europe Endurance Cup	HRT Ford Performance	5	0	0	0	0	8	20th
2026	Deutsche Tourenwagen Masters	HRT Ford Racing	16	0	1	2	1	133	8th
2026	Nürburgring Langstrecken-Serie - SP9	HRT Ford Racing							
2026	24 Hours of Nürburgring - SP9	HRT Ford Racing	1	0	0	0	0	N/A	DNF
2026	GT World Challenge Europe Endurance Cup	HRT Ford Racing	5	0	1	0	0	16	16th
2026–27	Asian Le Mans Series - GT3	Haupt Racing Team							

=== Complete BRDC Formula 4 Championship results ===
(key) (Races in bold indicate pole position) (Races in italics indicate points for the fastest lap of top ten finishers)

Year	Team	1	2	3	4	5	6	7	8	9	10	11	12	13	14	15	16	17	18	19	20	21	22	23	24	DC	Points
2014	Lanan Racing	SIL1; 1; 8	SIL1; 2; 11	SIL1; 3; 2	BRH1; 1; 2	BRH1; 2; 4	BRH1; 3; 4	SNE1; 1; 8	SNE1; 2; 1	SNE1; 3; 4	OUL; 1; 7	OUL; 2; 1	OUL; 3 Ret	SIL2; 1; 3	SIL2; 2; 8	SIL2; 3; 4	BRH2; 1; 3	BRH2; 2; 2	BRH2; 3; 1	DON; 1; 4	DON; 2; 4	DON; 3; 1	SNE2; 1; 8	SNE2; 2; 5	SNE2; 3; 5	2nd	480

=== Complete Toyota Racing Series results ===
(key) (Races in bold indicate pole position) (Races in italics indicate fastest lap)

Year	Team	1	2	3	4	5	6	7	8	9	10	11	12	13	14	15	16	DC	Points
2015	M2 Competition	RUA; 1; 2	RUA; 2; 6	RUA; 3; 2	TER; 1; 9	TER; 2; 7	TER; 3; 4	**HMP**; **1**; 1	HMP; 2; 16	HMP; 3; 4	**TAU**; **1**; 12	TAU; 2; 14	TAU; 3; 4	**TAU**; **4**; 1	MAN; 1; 2	MAN; 2; 17	**MAN**; **3**; 14	4th	750

=== Complete FIA Formula 3 European Championship results ===
(key) (Races in bold indicate pole position) (Races in italics indicate fastest lap)

Year	Entrant	Engine	1	2	3	4	5	6	7	8	9	10	11	12	13	14	15	16	17	18	19	20	21	22	23	24	25	26	27	28	29	30	31	32	33	DC	Points
2015	Van Amersfoort Racing	Volkswagen	SIL; 1 Ret	SIL; 2; 14	SIL; 3; 16	HOC; 1; 15	HOC; 2 Ret	HOC; 3; 13	PAU; 1; 12	PAU; 2; 4	PAU; 3; 5	MNZ; 1; 10	MNZ; 2; 20	MNZ; 3; 20	SPA; 1; 17	SPA; 2; 23	SPA; 3; 16	NOR; 1 Ret	NOR; 2; 14	NOR; 3; 17	ZAN; 1; 13	ZAN; 2; 15	ZAN; 3; 17	RBR; 1; 21	RBR; 2; 15	RBR; 3; 22	ALG; 1; 28	ALG; 2; 24	ALG; 3; 16	NÜR; 1; 8	NÜR; 2; 12	NÜR; 3; 16	HOC; 1; 29	HOC; 2; 14	HOC; 3; 17	18th	27
2016	Threebond with T-Sport	Threebond	LEC; 1 Ret	LEC; 2; 13	LEC; 3; 16																															21st	3
2016	Threebond with T-Sport	NBE				HUN; 1; 14	HUN; 2; 15	HUN; 3; 15	PAU; 1; 18	PAU; 2; 10	PAU; 3; 9	RBR; 1 Ret	RBR; 2 Ret	RBR; 3; 18	NOR; 1	NOR; 2	NOR; 3	ZAN; 1	ZAN; 2	ZAN; 3	SPA; 1	SPA; 2	SPA; 3	NÜR; 1	NÜR; 2	NÜR; 3	IMO; 1	IMO; 2	IMO; 3	HOC; 1	HOC; 2	HOC; 3				21st	3

=== Complete GP3 Series results ===
(key) (Races in bold indicate pole position) (Races in italics indicate fastest lap)

Year	Entrant	1	2	3	4	5	6	7	8	9	10	11	12	13	14	15	16	17	18	Pos	Points
2016	Jenzer Motorsport	CAT; FEA	CAT; SPR	RBR; FEA	RBR; SPR	SIL; FEA; 8	SIL; SPR; 19	HUN; FEA; 8	HUN; SPR; 2	HOC; FEA; 7	HOC; SPR; 5	SPA; FEA; Ret	SPA; SPR; 16	MNZ; FEA; 14	MNZ; SPR; 6	SEP; FEA; 4	SEP; SPR; 7	YMC; FEA; 14	YMC; SPR; 14	10th	50
2017	Jenzer Motorsport	CAT; FEA; 7	CAT; SPR; 1	RBR; FEA; 10	RBR; SPR; 16	SIL; FEA; 6	SIL; SPR; 5	HUN; FEA; Ret	HUN; SPR; 8	SPA; FEA; 4	SPA; SPR; 6	MNZ; FEA; 16†	MNZ; SPR; C	JER; FEA; 17	JER; SPR; 12	YMC; FEA; 3	YMC; SPR; 6			9th	72

^{†} Driver did not finish the race, but was classified as he completed over 90% of the race distance.

=== Complete FIA Formula 2 Championship results ===
(key) (Races in bold indicate pole position) (Races in italics indicate points for the fastest lap of top ten finishers)

Year	Entrant	1	2	3	4	5	6	7	8	9	10	11	12	13	14	15	16	17	18	19	20	21	22	23	24	DC	Points
2018	Trident	BHR; FEA; 15	BHR; SPR; 14	BAK; FEA; Ret	BAK; SPR; 5	CAT; FEA; Ret	CAT; SPR; 13	MON; FEA; 5	MON; SPR; 5	LEC; FEA; 10	LEC; SPR; 13	RBR; FEA; 14	RBR; SPR; 10	SIL; FEA; 14	SIL; SPR; 13	HUN; FEA; 12	HUN; SPR; 14	SPA; FEA; 14	SPA; SPR; 8	MNZ; FEA; Ret	MNZ; SPR; 9	SOC; FEA; 15	SOC; SPR; 15	YMC; FEA; Ret	YMC; SPR; DNS	16th	24
2019	Campos Racing	BHR; FEA	BHR; SPR	BAK; FEA	BAK; SPR	CAT; FEA	CAT; SPR	MON; FEA	MON; SPR	LEC; FEA	LEC; SPR	RBR; SPR; DSQ	RBR; SPR; 15	SIL; FEA; 13	SIL; SPR; 13	HUN; FEA; Ret	HUN; SPR; 16	SPA; FEA	SPA; SPR	MNZ; FEA	MNZ; SPR	SOC; FEA	SOC; SPR	YMC; FEA	YMC; SPR	24th	0

=== Complete European Le Mans Series results ===
(key) (Races in bold indicate pole position; results in italics indicate fastest lap)

Year	Entrant	Class	Chassis	Engine	1	2	3	4	5	6	Rank	Points
2019	RLR MSport	LMP2	Oreca 07	Gibson GK428 4.2 L V8	LEC; 8	MNZ; Ret	CAT; 13	SIL; Ret	SPA; 14	ALG; 15	21st	5.5
2020	Algarve Pro Racing	LMP2	Oreca 07	Gibson GK428 4.2 L V8	LEC	SPA	LEC	MNZ; 8	ALG; 8		22nd	8

=== Complete 24 Hours of Le Mans results ===
Year	Team	Co-Drivers	Car	Class	Laps	Pos.	Class Pos.
2019	(United Kingdom) RLR M Sport/Tower Events	(Canada) John Farano (France) Norman Nato	Oreca 07-Gibson	LMP2	295	NC	NC

=== Complete Asian Le Mans Series results ===
(key) (Races in bold indicate pole position) (Races in italics indicate fastest lap)

Year	Entrant	Class	Car	Engine	1	2	3	4	DC	Points
2021	Racing Team India	LMP2	Oreca 07	Gibson GK428 4.2 L V8	DUB; 1; 5	DUB; 2; 4	ABU; 1; 5	ABU; 2; 5	5th	42
2022	Bilstein Haupt Racing Team	GT	Mercedes-AMG GT3 Evo	Mercedes-AMG M159 6.2 L V8	DUB; 1; 7	DUB; 2; 9	ABU; 1; 9	ABU; 2; 7	9th	16
2023	Haupt Racing Team	GT	Mercedes-AMG GT3 Evo	Mercedes-AMG M159 6.2 L V8	DUB; 1; 7	DUB; 2; 15	ABU; 1; 13	ABU; 2 Ret	15th	6

=== Complete Deutsche Tourenwagen Masters results ===
(key) (Races in bold indicate pole position) (Races in italics indicate fastest lap)

Year	Team	Car	1	2	3	4	5	6	7	8	9	10	11	12	13	14	15	16	Pos	Points
2021	Mercedes-AMG Team GetSpeed	Mercedes-AMG GT3 Evo	MNZ; 1; 13	MNZ; 2 Ret	LAU; 1 Ret	LAU; 2; 12	ZOL; 1 Ret	ZOL; 2 DNS	NÜR; 1; 10	NÜR; 2; 13	RBR; 1; 6^{3}	RBR; 2; 7	ASS; 1 Ret	ASS; 2; 13	HOC; 1 Ret	HOC; 2; 8^{3}	NOR; 1; 2	NOR; 2; 6	12th	48
2022	Mercedes-AMG Team HRT	Mercedes-AMG GT3 Evo	ALG; 1; 17	ALG; 2; 13	LAU; 1; 4	LAU; 2; 13	IMO; 1; 16	IMO; 2; 18	NOR; 1 Ret	NOR; 2; 14	NÜR; 1; 15	NÜR; 2; 14	SPA; 1; 14	SPA; 2; 11	RBR; 1; 13	RBR; 2; 4	HOC; 1 Ret	HOC; 2 DNS	19th	24
2023	Mercedes-AMG Team HRT	Mercedes-AMG GT3 Evo	OSC; 1 Ret	OSC; 2; 15	ZAN; 1; 17	ZAN; 2; 17	NOR; 1; 13	NOR; 2; 15	NÜR; 1; 16	NÜR; 2 DSQ	LAU; 1 Ret	LAU; 2; 14	SAC; 1; 13	SAC; 2; 7	RBR; 1; 14	RBR; 2; 10	HOC; 1 Ret	HOC; 2; 13	20th	30
2024	Mercedes-AMG Team HRT	Mercedes-AMG GT3 Evo	OSC; 1; 8^{3}	OSC; 2; 4	LAU; 1; 7	LAU; 2; 12	ZAN; 1; 3^{3}	ZAN; 2; 6	NOR; 1; 15	NOR; 2; 4	NÜR; 1; 10	NÜR; 2 Ret	SAC; 1; 5	SAC; 2 Ret	**RBR**; **1**; 3^{1}	RBR; 2; 3	HOC; 1; 8	HOC; 2; 13	7th	139
2025	HRT Ford Performance	Ford Mustang GT3	OSC; 1; 15	OSC; 2; 16	LAU; 1; 12	LAU; 2; 17	ZAN; 1 Ret	ZAN; 2; 10	NOR; 1; 8	NOR; 2; 5^{3}	NÜR; 1 Ret	NÜR; 2; 6	SAC; 1; 20	SAC; 2 Ret	RBR; 1; 11	RBR; 2; 5	HOC; 1; 14	HOC; 2; 13	15th	62
2026	HRT Ford Racing	Ford Mustang GT3 Evo	RBR; 1; 7	RBR; 2; 11	ZAN; 1; 12	ZAN; 2; 16	LAU; 1; 9^{2}	**LAU**; **2**; 4^{1}	NOR; 1; 3^{3}	NOR; 2; 4^{3}	OSC; 1; 6	OSC; 2; 5	NÜR; 1 Ret	NÜR; 2; 4	SAC; 1; 12	SAC; 2; 11	HOC; 1; 8	HOC; 2; 8	8th	133

=== Complete GT World Challenge Europe results ===
==== GT World Challenge Europe Endurance Cup ====
(key) (Races in bold indicate pole position) (Races in italics indicate fastest lap)

Year	Team	Car	Class	1	2	3	4	5	6	7	Pos.	Points
2022	Haupt Racing Team	Mercedes-AMG GT3 Evo	Gold	IMO; 23	LEC; Ret	SPA; 6H; 19	SPA; 12H; 31†	SPA; 24H; Ret	HOC; 17	CAT; 36	5th	56
2023	Haupt Racing Team	Mercedes-AMG GT3 Evo	Bronze	MNZ; 18	LEC; 14	SPA; 6H; 36	SPA; 12H; 34	SPA; 24H; 24	NÜR; 24	CAT; 25	2nd	89
2024	Haupt Racing Team	Mercedes-AMG GT3 Evo	Gold	LEC; 47	SPA; 6H; 47	SPA; 12H; 40	SPA; 24H; 17	NÜR; 19	MNZ; 22	JED; 19	3rd	95
2025	HRT Ford Performance	Ford Mustang GT3	Pro	LEC; 11	MNZ; Ret	SPA; 6H; 40	SPA; 12H; 11	SPA; 24H; Ret	NÜR; 6	CAT; 51†	20th	8
2026	HRT Ford Racing	Ford Mustang GT3 Evo	Pro	LEC; 25	**MNZ**; Ret	SPA; 6H; 6	SPA; 12H; 7	SPA; 24H; Ret	NÜR; 6	ALG; 16	16th	16

^{*} Season still in progress.

=== Complete Nürburgring Langstrecken-Serie results ===
(key) (Races in bold indicate pole position) (Races in italics indicate fastest lap)

Year	Team	Car	Class	1	2	3	4	5	6	7	8	9	10	Pos.	Points
2022	Haupt Racing Team	Mercedes-AMG GT3 Evo	SP9	NLS; 1	NLS; 2	NLS; 3	NLS; 4	NLS; 5; 6	NLS; 6	NLS; 7	NLS; 8 DNS	NLS; 9		NC†	0
2023	Haupt Racing Team	Mercedes-AMG GT3 Evo	SP9	NLS; 1; 11	NLS; 2; 16	NLS; 3	NLS; 4	NLS; 5	NLS; 6	NLS; 7	NLS; 8	NLS; 9; 9		NC†	0
2024	Mercedes-AMG Team Bilstein by HRT	Mercedes-AMG GT3 Evo	SP9	NLS; 1	NLS; 2	24H; Q1; 13	24H; Q2; 14							NC†	0
2024	Team Advan x HRT	Mercedes-AMG GT3 Evo	SP9					NLS; 3; 3	NLS; 4	NLS; 5	NLS; 6			NC†	0
2025	HRT Ford Performance	Ford Mustang GT3	SP9	NLS; 1 DNS	NLS; 2	NLS; 3 WD	24H; Q1	24H; Q2	NLS; 6	NLS; 7	NLS; 8	NLS; 9	NLS; 10	NC†	0
2026	HRT Ford Racing	Ford Mustang GT3 Evo	SP9	NLS; 1	NLS; 2; 11	NLS; 3	24H; Q1; C	24H; Q2; 9	NLS; 6	NLS; 7	NLS; 8	NLS; 9	NLS; 10	NC†	0

^{†}As Maini was a guest driver, he was ineligible for points.

=== Complete ADAC GT Masters results ===
(key) (Races in bold indicate pole position) (Races in italics indicate fastest lap)

Year	Team	Car	1	2	3	4	5	6	7	8	9	10	11	12	DC	Points
2023	Haupt Racing Team	Mercedes-AMG GT3 Evo	HOC; 1; 6	**HOC**; **2**; 2^{1}	NOR; 1	NOR; 2	NÜR; 1; 12	NÜR; 2; 12	SAC; 1	SAC; 2	RBR; 1	RBR; 2	HOC; 1	HOC; 2	13th	41
