= Chetan Maini =

Vice Chairman at SUN Mobility

- Born: 3 March 1970 (age 56); Bangalore, India
- Education: University of Michigan; Stanford University
- Known for: Founder of Reva Electric Car Company

Chetan Maini (born 3 March 1970) is an Indian engineer and entrepreneur in the electric vehicle industry. Maini is also the founder of the REVA, established in 1994, which later became Mahindra Electric Mobility Limited, where he was an advisor. SUN Mobility, a joint venture between Virya Mobility 5.0 and SUN New Energy Systems, a provider of charging points and services. Chetan is the director of Maini Group and co-founder of Virya Mobility 5.0.

From July 2013 to April 2015, Chetan was Chief Executive Officer, Chief of Technology and Strategy, and deputy chairman at Mahindra Reva, which he founded as Reva Electric Car Company in 1994. Chetan holds over 40 patents in battery and energy management systems in electric vehicle technologies. Chetan has been involved in developing multiple electric, solar, and hybrid vehicles in India.

Maini’s work in electric mobility has been recognised with several awards, including being named among India’s Top 50 Influential People by Business Week in 2009, Man of the Year by Top Gear India in 2014, and receiving the Innovation Award in Energy and Environment from The Economist.

== Early life and education ==
Chetan was born on 11 March 1970 in Bangalore, India, to Sudarshan K. Maini and Reva Maini. His father was the founder of the Maini group of industries, the manufacturer of India's first electric car, REVA. As a child, Chetan used to take apart and build cars. He received a master's degree in hybrid electric technology from Stanford. While he was an undergraduate student at the University of Michigan, he was involved in the solar car project and the subsequent solar car race. His team built and raced a solar car in the U.S. — and, as it happened, came in first. Later that year, in 1990, General Motors sponsored the team to race in the World Solar Challenge in Australia where they came in third. Their vehicle, called “Sunrunner,” beat many of the big American auto companies.

Chetan Maini is the uncle of racing drivers Arjun and Kush Maini. Arjun Maini was a development driver for the Haas F1 Team. He is currently competing in the DTM as a driver for Mercedes-AMG. Kush Maini is currently competing in the FIA Formula 2 championship.

Chetan completed his master's degree in mechanical engineering at Stanford University in 1993 after obtaining a bachelor's degree in mechanical engineering (BSME) at the University of Michigan in 1992.

== Patents ==
Chetan has filed/has been awarded over 40 patents in battery and energy management systems in electric vehicle technologies. A few of them are listed below:

- Radio Frequency Battery Management
- A Power Pack System and A Ventilation System Provided Therein
- A System and a Method for Charging Battery in Electric Vehicles Using Non-Conventional Energy Sources
- A System and a Method for Determining Distance to Empty of A Vehicle
- Anti-lock braking for electric vehicles
- Determination and Usage of Reserve Energy in Stored Energy Systems

== Career ==
Amerigon (1994–1999):

Chetan worked as a program manager at Amerigon, created several new EV technologies for US and global markets, and initiated the Reva project - an affordable electric car for developing countries. He also led the team to conceptualize, design and build the prototype.

Maini Group (1999–present):

Currently, Chetan is the Director at Maini Group. It is involved in engineering components, materials handling, warehousing and logistics, aerospace and electric vehicles. This led to it becoming the first in India to design and manufacture electric vehicles. Maini Group, while having its manufacturing base in India, has warehousing and marketing networks extending across more than 25 countries with well over 75% of turnover exported to over 200 international customers (http://www.mainigroup.com/beginning.html).

Reva Electric Car Company (1994–2010):

Chetan built and led a team in Bengaluru, India to create the country's first electric car. Reva launched the vehicle in a record time of 2 years, with a significant thrust on frugal engineering. The Reva, when launched, was the world's most affordable city electric car. He expanded the business to London in 2004, where it was sold under the aegis of G-Wiz. With an aim to expand and grow in 24 countries, Chetan brought in global investors.

Mahindra Reva Electric Vehicles Pvt Ltd (2010–2015):

As Founder and Chief of Technology and Strategy (2010- Jun 2013):

After Reva joined hands with the Mahindra Group, Mahindra Reva was formed, where Chetan worked as Chief of Technology & Strategy. For 3 years, he focused on building new IP, technologies, and filed over 30 patents in key areas such as advanced energy management systems, telematics, remote diagnostics, fast charging, sun2 car etc. He led the development of the next generation e2o vehicle that was launched in 2013, and created a world->class platinum rated green facility with a capacity to manufacture 30,000 units per year.

As Founder and CEO (July 2013- April 2015):

In July 2013, Chetan became CEO at Mahindra Reva Electric Vehicles Pvt Ltd. During his tenure as CEO, he launched the upgraded e2o electric car which had increased range and performance. Chetan introduced several new initiatives to enhance sales including the ‘energy model’ where you pay as you go -a new way to experience electric cars and an enhanced charging network. With a strong focus on building the brand and technology, he showcased the next-generation Halo electric car at the Delhi auto show 2014 and supported the entry of Mahindra to Formula Electric Racing Series. Chetan continued developing products for European and Indian markets and developed next-generation electric conversion platforms for Mahindra, including the e-Verito (passenger sedan), and launched a pilot of the e-Maximmo electric 8-seater vehicles in Agra.

Lithium Urban Technologies (2016–present):

Chetan Maini is the director and co-promoter of Lithium Urban Technologies, an initiative to establish the infrastructure and service environment for shared electric-powered mobility in India . It is India's first zero emission transport service, with a fleet of Electric Vehicles (EVs) and associated charging infrastructure.

Virya Mobility 5.0 (February 2017 – present)

Chetan is a partner at Virya Mobility 5.0 (Virya), owned by the Maini brothers. It focuses on investing and developing electric vehicle technologies, charging infrastructure and services ecosystem. Virya explores numerous possibilities in alternative energy, powertrain, energy storage technologies and business models around them.

SUN Mobility Pvt Ltd: (April 2017 – present)

Chetan is currently co-founder, Vice Chairman of SUN Mobility, a 50:50 joint venture between Virya Mobility 5.0 and SUN New Energy Systems. The joint venture aims to be the leading provider of universal energy infrastructure and services to accelerate mass electric vehicle usage. The organization plans to deploy a unique open-architecture ecosystem built around a smart network of quick interchange battery stations. These stations, predominantly powered by renewable energy, would refuel electric vehicles at a lower cost and faster speed than conventional fuel pumps. In July 2017, the organization announced a strategic alliance with Ashok Leyland to build electric buses. In September 2021 Bosch, a technology provider and services in the mobility ecosystem, has acquired a 26 per cent stake in the SUN Mobility.

== Honour & Awards ==
- The YEO Thomas Alva Edison Award for Entrepreneurship and Innovation in 2002
- Indira super achiever award from the Indira group of institutes, Pune
- The Monte Carlo Sustainable Mobility Award 2005 for RECC's leadership
- Chetan was named Entrepreneur of the Year at the All India Management Association Managing India Awards 2010.
- The Economist Innovative Award for Energy and Environment at a ceremony at the Science Museum in London in 2011
- Indian Business Icon Award by CNBC TV 18 in 2011
- One of the ‘Top Seven Indians Who Changed The Face of Indian Motoring’ by Car Wale in 2017

== Positions held ==
- National Mission on Electric Mobility (Govt. of India) - Board Member (2012–present)
- Young Global Leader - World Economic Forum (2011–present)
- Entrepreneur Organization (2001–present)
- World Economic Forum - Global Agenda Council for Personal Mobility - Chairman (2012–2013)
