= James Pull =

British-Singaporean racing driver (born 1999)

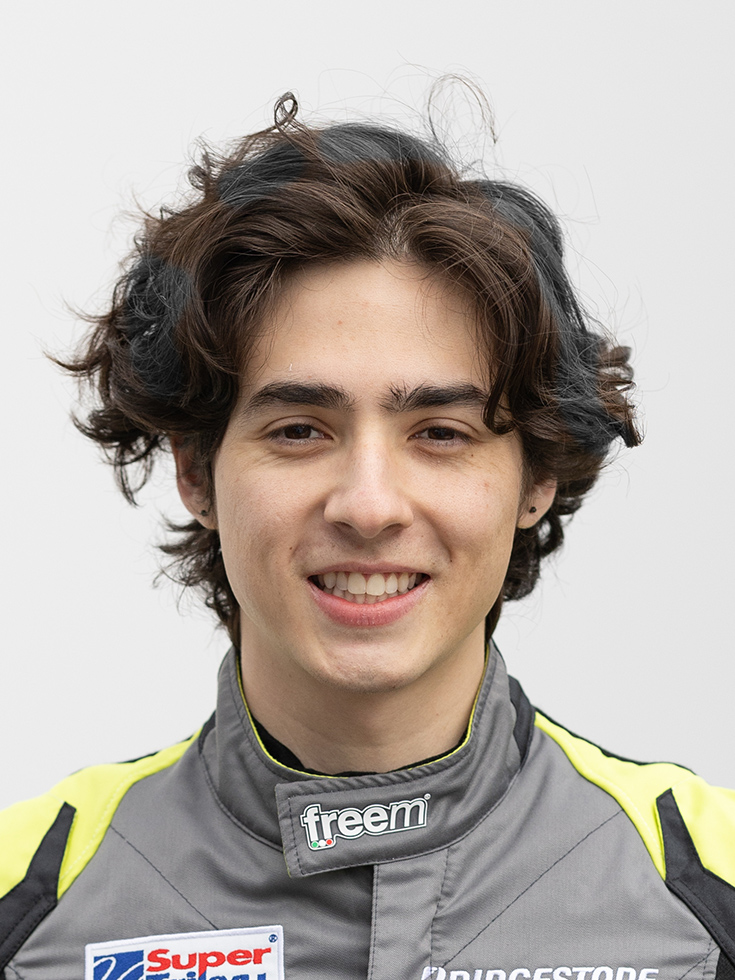
- Pull in 2025
- Nationality: (United Kingdom) British; Singapore
- Born: 5 October 1999 (age 27) Singapore
- Categorisation: FIA Silver (until 2021); FIA Gold (2022–)

Super GT - GT300 career
- Debut season: 2026
- Current team: Nilzz Racing
- Car number: 48

Super Taikyu Series career
- Debut season: 2024
- Current team: Aoyama Gakuin University Automobile Club
- Car number: 8
- Former teams: Hitotsuyama Racing
- Podiums: 2 (2025)

Previous series
- 2024-2025 2021 2020 2019 2018 2018 2017 2017 2016 2016 2016 2015: Super Taikyu Series; GT World Challenge Europe; Blancpain GT Series Endurance Cup; Lamborghini Super Trofeo; Toyota Racing Series; Formula Renault 2.0 NEC; BRDC British Formula 3 Championship; BRDC British Formula 3 Championship; BRDC British Formula 3 Autumn Trophy; F4 British Championship; MSA Formula

James Pull (born 5 October 1999) is a British–Singaporean racing driver, living in Japan. He currently is competing in the Super GT in the GT300 class and Super Taikyu Series for Aoyama Gakuin University Automobile Club.‍

Pull made his single-seater debut in Formula 4 during the 2015 MSA Formula Championship, driving for JTR and Fortec Motorsport. In 2016, he joined Carlin Motorsport, and in 2017, he finished as runner-up while winning the rookie title in the BRDC British Formula 3 Championship.

== Sportscar career ==
=== Europe ===
==== 2018–2021 ====
In 2018, Pull competed in the Lamborghini Super Trofeo Championship, securing five race victories and finishing runner-up in both the Asia and Middle East series.

Transitioning to GT racing in 2019, he claimed a Silver Cup class victory on his debut at the Spa 24 Hours endurance race in the Blancpain GT Series Endurance Cup.

Making his GT World Challenge Europe debut in September 2020 with R-Motorsport, Pull won the Silver Cup class in the six-hour race at the Nürburgring in his first race as part of the Aston Martin Racing Driver Academy.

Pull returned to the GT World Challenge Europe championship in 2021 with ROFGO Racing with Team WRT, where he placed on the podium at Monza.

=== Japan ===
==== 2024 – current ====
In 2024, he relocated to Japan to compete in the Super Taikyu Series with Hitotsuyama Racing in the ST-Z class. He then moved up to the top ST-X class for the 2025 season, where he scored two podiums across the season, including at the 24 Hours of Fuji.

In 2026, James made his debut in the Super GT with Nilzz Racing in the GT300 class #48 GT-R Nismo GT3. He also returned to Super Taikyu Series, racing in the #8 Toyota GR Supra GT4 Evo with Aoyama Gakuin University Automobile Club.‍

== Early life ==
Born in Singapore to a Malaysian mother and a British father, Pull began karting in 2008 at the age of eight. He began to compete at a competitive level across Asia from 2009 to 2011, and then in Europe from 2011 to 2014 with Chiesa Corse and the Tony Kart Racing Team respectively.

== Racing record ==
=== Career summary ===
Season	Series	Team	Races	Wins	Poles	F/Laps	Podiums	Points	Position
2015	MSA Formula Championship	JTR	18	0	0	2	4	104	10th
2015	MSA Formula Championship	Fortec Motorsports	12	0	0	0	0	104	10th
2016	F4 British Championship	Carlin	30	2	1	4	8	291	4th
2016	BRDC British Formula 3 Championship	Carlin	3	0	0	0	0	33	26th
2016	BRDC British Formula 3 Autumn Trophy	Carlin	3	0	0	0	0	36	8th
2017	BRDC British Formula 3 Championship	Carlin	24	0	1	0	14	490	**2nd**
2017	Formula Renault NEC	Arden Motorsport	2	0	0	0	0	48	13th
2017	Formula Renault NEC	Josef Kaufmann Racing	2	0	0	0	0	48	13th
2018	Toyota Racing Series	M2 Competition	15	0	0	0	3	692	6th
2018	Lamborghini Super Trofeo Asia - Pro	FFF Racing Team	12	0	0	0	10	121	**2nd**
2018	Lamborghini Super Trofeo Middle East	FFF Racing Team	2	2	1	0	2	64	**2nd**
2018	Lamborghini Super Trofeo Europe	Bonaldi Motorsport	12	1	0	0	4	65	5th
2018	Lamborghini Super Trofeo World Finals	Bonaldi Motorsport	2	0	0	0	1	12	5th
2019	Blancpain GT Series Endurance Cup	Barwell Motorsport	5	0	0	0	0	0	NC
2019	Blancpain GT Series Endurance Cup - Silver Cup	Barwell Motorsport	5	1	0	1	1	61	4th
2019	Italian GT Championship	Imperiale Racing	1	1	0	0	1	0	NC†
2020	GT World Challenge Europe Endurance Cup	Garage 59	3	0	0	0	0	0	NC
2020	GT World Challenge Europe Endurance Cup - Silver Cup	Garage 59	3	1	0	0	1	40	9th
2021	GT World Challenge Europe Endurance Cup	ROFGO Racing with Team WRT	5	0	0	0	0	8	24th
2021	GT World Challenge Europe Endurance Cup - Silver Cup	ROFGO Racing with Team WRT	5	0	0	0	1	61	5th
2021	Intercontinental GT Challenge	Team WRT	1	0	0	0	0	0	NC
2024	Super Taikyu - ST-Z	Hitotsuyama Racing	7	0	0	0	1	75‡	6th‡
2025	Super Taikyu – ST-X	Hitotsuyama Racing	5	0	0	0	2	58.5‡	5th‡
2026	Super GT - GT300	Nilzz Racing	8	0	0	0	0	1	42nd
2026	Super Taikyu - ST-Z	Aoyama Gakuin Automobile Club							

^{†} As Pull was a guest driver, he was ineligible for points. ^{*} Season still in progress.

=== Complete MSA Formula Championship/British F4 Championship results ===
(key) (Races in bold indicate pole position) (Races in italics indicate fastest lap)

Year	Team	1	2	3	4	5	6	7	8	9	10	11	12	13	14	15	16	17	18	19	20	21	22	23	24	25	26	27	28	29	30	DC	Points
2015	JTR	BHI; 1; 8	BHI; 2; 3	BHI; 3; 2	DON; 1; 2	DON; 2; 7	DON; 3; 3	THR; 1 Ret	THR; 2; 11	THR; 3 Ret	OUL; 1 Ret	OUL; 2; 13	OUL; 3; 8	CRO; 1; 11	CRO; 2; 10	CRO; 3; 12	SNE; 1; 18	SNE; 2; 16	SNE; 3; 13													10th	104
2015	Fortec Motorsports																			KNO; 1; 6	KNO; 2 Ret	KNO; 3 Ret	ROC; 1; 16	ROC; 2; 14	ROC; 3; 7	SIL; 1; 9	SIL; 2; 17	SIL; 3 Ret	BHGP; 1; 10	BHGP; 2; 9	BHGP; 3; 6	10th	104
2016	Carlin	BHI; 1; 3	BHI; 2; 3	BHI; 3; 3	DON; 1; 4	DON; 2 Ret	DON; 3; 4	THR; 1; 6	THR; 2; 7	THR; 3; 4	OUL; 1; 6	OUL; 2; 2	OUL; 3; 5	CRO; 1; 8	CRO; 2; 5	CRO; 3; 6	SNE; 1; 3	SNE; 2; 2	SNE; 3 Ret	KNO; 1; 7	KNO; 2; 5	KNO; 3; 7	**ROC**; **1**; 1	ROC; 2 DSQ	ROC; 3; 9	SIL; 1; 4	SIL; 2; 12	SIL; 3; 6	BHGP; 1; 1	BHGP; 2; 7	BHGP; 3; 4	4th	291

=== Complete BRDC British Formula 3 Championship results ===
(key) (Races in bold indicate pole position) (Races in italics indicate fastest lap)

Year	Team	1	2	3	4	5	6	7	8	9	10	11	12	13	14	15	16	17	18	19	20	21	22	23	24	DC	Points
2016	Carlin	SNE1; 1	SNE1; 2	SNE1; 3	BRH1; 1	BRH1; 2	BRH1; 3	ROC; 1	ROC; 2	ROC; 3	OUL; 1	OUL; 2	OUL; 3	SIL; 1	SIL; 2	SIL; 3	SPA; 1	SPA; 2	SPA; 3	SNE2; 1	SNE2; 2	SNE2; 3	BRH2; 1; 11	BRH2; 2; 11	BRH2; 3; 8	26th	33
2017	Carlin	OUL; 1; 2	OUL; 2; 4	OUL; 3; 3	ROC; 1; 5	ROC; 2 Ret	ROC; 3; 2	**SNE1**; **1**; 2	SNE1; 2; 14	SNE1; 3; 3	SIL; 1; 3	SIL; 2; 3	SIL; 3; 2	SPA; 1; 8	SPA; 2; 2	SPA; 3; 4	BRH; 1; 2	BRH; 2; 2	BRH; 3; 3	SNE2; 1; 3	SNE2; 2; 13	SNE2; 3; 7	DON; 1; 4	DON; 2; 3	DON; 3; 5	2nd	490

=== Complete Formula Renault Northern European Cup results ===
(key) (Races in bold indicate pole position) (Races in italics indicate fastest lap)

Year	Team	1	2	3	4	5	6	7	8	9	10	11	DC	Points
2017	Arden Motorsport	MNZ; 1	MNZ; 2	ASS; 1	ASS; 2	NÜR; 1; 10	NÜR; 2; 9	SPA; 1	SPA; 2	SPA; 3			13th	48
2017	Josef Kaufmann Racing										HOC; 1; 10	HOC; 2; 7	13th	48

=== Complete Toyota Racing Series results ===
(key) (Races in bold indicate pole position) (Races in italics indicate fastest lap)

Year	Team	1	2	3	4	5	6	7	8	9	10	11	12	13	14	15	DC	Points
2018	M2 Competition	RUA; 1; 5	RUA; 2; 11	RUA; 3; 3	TER; 1; 5	TER; 2; 2	TER; 3; 6	HMP; 1; 7	HMP; 2; 7	HMP; 3; 5	TAU; 1; 2	TAU; 2; 8	TAU; 3; 7	MAN; 1; 8	MAN; 2; 8	MAN; 3; 10	6th	692

=== Complete GT World Challenge Europe results ===
==== GT World Challenge Europe Endurance Cup ====
(key) (Races in bold indicate pole position) (Races in italics indicate fastest lap)

Year	Team	Car	Class	1	2	3	4	5	6	7	Pos.	Points
2019	Barwell Motorsport	Lamborghini Huracán GT3 Evo	Silver	MNZ; 26	SIL; 15	LEC; Ret	SPA; 6H; 20	SPA; 12H; 27	SPA; 24H; 15	CAT; 18	4th	61
2020	Garage 59	Aston Martin Vantage AMR GT3	Silver	IMO	NÜR; 12	SPA; 6H; 25	SPA; 12H; 44	SPA; 24H; Ret	LEC; Ret		9th	40
2021	ROFGO Racing with Team WRT	Audi R8 LMS Evo	Silver	MNZ; 6	LEC; 19	SPA; 6H; 47	SPA; 12H; 25	SPA; 24H; 22	NÜR; 13	CAT; 18	5th	61

=== Complete Super GT results ===
(key) (Races in bold indicate pole position) (Races in italics indicate fastest lap)

Year	Team	Car	Class	1	2	3	4	5	6	7	8	DC	Points
2026	Nilzz Racing	Nissan GT-R Nismo GT3	GT300	OKA; 29	FUJ; 15	FUJ; 24	SUZ; 24	SUG; 23	AUT; 25†	MOT; 20	MOT; 23	42nd	1
