= 2020 GT World Challenge Europe Endurance Cup =

Motorsports event

The 2020 GT World Challenge Europe Endurance Cup was the tenth season of the GT World Challenge Europe Endurance Cup and the first after title sponsor Blancpain withdrew support.

== Calendar ==
The season began on 19 July at Imola and ended on 15 November at Paul Ricard. The season featured four rounds, with one race lasting for a duration of three hours, the Circuit Paul Ricard 1000 km, the 6 Hours of Nürburgring lasting for a duration of six hours and the 24 Hours of Spa events.

Round	Race	Circuit	Date
1	3 Hours of Imola	Autodromo Enzo e Dino Ferrari, Imola, Italy	26 July
2	6 Hours of Nürburgring	Nürburgring, Nürburg, Germany	6 September
3	Total 24 Hours of Spa	Circuit de Spa-Francorchamps, Stavelot, Belgium	24-25 October
4	Circuit Paul Ricard 1000 km	Circuit Paul Ricard, Le Castellet, France	15 November
Cancelled due to the 2019-20 coronavirus pandemic
	Race	Circuit	Original Date
	3 Hours of Monza	Autodromo Nazionale Monza, Monza, Italy	19 April
	3 Hours of Silverstone	(United Kingdom) Silverstone Circuit, Silverstone, Great Britain	10 May
	3 Hours of Barcelona	Circuit de Barcelona-Catalunya, Montmeló, Spain	11 October (Note: Now forms part of the 2020 GT World Challenge Europe Sprint Cup.)

== Entry list ==
Team	Car	No.	Drivers	Class	Rounds
(United States) Bentley K-PAX Racing	Bentley Continental GT3	3	(France) Jules Gounon	P	All
(United States) Bentley K-PAX Racing	Bentley Continental GT3	3	(Belgium) Maxime Soulet	P	All
(United States) Bentley K-PAX Racing	Bentley Continental GT3	3	(Brazil) Rodrigo Baptista	P	1–2, 4
(United States) Bentley K-PAX Racing	Bentley Continental GT3	3	(South Africa) Jordan Pepper	P	3
(United States) Bentley K-PAX Racing	Bentley Continental GT3	9	(Spain) Andy Soucek	P	All
(United States) Bentley K-PAX Racing	Bentley Continental GT3	9	(Portugal) Álvaro Parente	P	1, 3–4
(United States) Bentley K-PAX Racing	Bentley Continental GT3	9	(South Africa) Jordan Pepper	P	1–2, 4
(United States) Bentley K-PAX Racing	Bentley Continental GT3	9	(United Kingdom) Alex Buncombe	P	2
(United States) Bentley K-PAX Racing	Bentley Continental GT3	9	(Brazil) Rodrigo Baptista	P	3
(Germany) / Mercedes-AMG Team HRT (Note: Car No. 4 entered as Haupt Racing Team from Rounds 1 to 2 and as Mercedes-AMG Team HRT at Round 3, car No. 5 entered as Haupt Racing Team.); (Germany) / Haupt Racing Team	Mercedes-AMG GT3 Evo	4	(France) Vincent Abril	P	All
(Germany) / Mercedes-AMG Team HRT; (Germany) / Haupt Racing Team	Mercedes-AMG GT3 Evo	4	(Germany) Maro Engel	P	All
(Germany) / Mercedes-AMG Team HRT; (Germany) / Haupt Racing Team	Mercedes-AMG GT3 Evo	4	(Germany) Luca Stolz	P	All
(Germany) / Mercedes-AMG Team HRT; (Germany) / Haupt Racing Team	Mercedes-AMG GT3 Evo	5	(Russia) Sergey Afanasyev	S	All
(Germany) / Mercedes-AMG Team HRT; (Germany) / Haupt Racing Team	Mercedes-AMG GT3 Evo	5	(Germany) Hubert Haupt	S	All
(Germany) / Mercedes-AMG Team HRT; (Germany) / Haupt Racing Team	Mercedes-AMG GT3 Evo	5	(United Kingdom) Finlay Hutchison	S	1
(Germany) / Mercedes-AMG Team HRT; (Germany) / Haupt Racing Team	Mercedes-AMG GT3 Evo	5	(Switzerland) Joël Camathias	S	2
(Germany) / Mercedes-AMG Team HRT; (Germany) / Haupt Racing Team	Mercedes-AMG GT3 Evo	5	(Italy) Michele Beretta	S	3–4
(Germany) / Mercedes-AMG Team HRT; (Germany) / Haupt Racing Team	Mercedes-AMG GT3 Evo	5	(Italy) Gabriele Piana	S	3
(Belgium) Boutsen Ginion Racing	BMW M6 GT3	10	(Saudi Arabia) Karim Ojjeh	PA	All
(Belgium) Boutsen Ginion Racing	BMW M6 GT3	10	(France) Gilles Vannelet	PA	All
(Belgium) Boutsen Ginion Racing	BMW M6 GT3	10	(United Kingdom) Nick Yelloly	PA	1
(Belgium) Boutsen Ginion Racing	BMW M6 GT3	10	(Germany) Jens Klingmann	PA	2–4
(Belgium) Boutsen Ginion Racing	BMW M6 GT3	10	(Belgium) Benjamin Lessennes	PA	3
(United Kingdom) Team Parker Racing	Bentley Continental GT3	11	(United Kingdom) Frank Bird	S	All
(United Kingdom) Team Parker Racing	Bentley Continental GT3	11	(Denmark) Nicolai Kjærgaard	S	All
(United Kingdom) Team Parker Racing	Bentley Continental GT3	11	(United Kingdom) Euan McKay	S	All
(United Arab Emirates) GPX Racing	Porsche 911 GT3 R	12	(Australia) Matt Campbell	P	All
(United Arab Emirates) GPX Racing	Porsche 911 GT3 R	12	(France) Mathieu Jaminet	P	All
(United Arab Emirates) GPX Racing	Porsche 911 GT3 R	12	(France) Patrick Pilet	P	All
(United Arab Emirates) GPX Racing	Porsche 911 GT3 R	40	(France) Romain Dumas	P	All
(United Arab Emirates) GPX Racing	Porsche 911 GT3 R	40	(Austria) Thomas Preining	P	All
(United Arab Emirates) GPX Racing	Porsche 911 GT3 R	40	(Switzerland) Louis Delétraz	P	1, 3–4
(United Arab Emirates) GPX Racing	Porsche 911 GT3 R	40	(Norway) Dennis Olsen	P	2
(Switzerland) Emil Frey Racing	Lamborghini Huracán GT3 Evo	14	(Switzerland) Ricardo Feller	P	All
(Switzerland) Emil Frey Racing	Lamborghini Huracán GT3 Evo	14	(Canada) Mikaël Grenier	P	All
(Switzerland) Emil Frey Racing	Lamborghini Huracán GT3 Evo	14	(Austria) Norbert Siedler	P	All
(Switzerland) Emil Frey Racing	Lamborghini Huracán GT3 Evo	163	(Italy) Giacomo Altoè	P	All
(Switzerland) Emil Frey Racing	Lamborghini Huracán GT3 Evo	163	(Spain) Albert Costa	P	All
(Switzerland) Emil Frey Racing	Lamborghini Huracán GT3 Evo	163	(France) Franck Perera	P	1–3
(Switzerland) Emil Frey Racing	Lamborghini Huracán GT3 Evo	163	(Denmark) Mikkel Mac	P	4
(France) Tech 1 Racing	Lexus RC F GT3	15	(France) Timothé Buret	S	All
(France) Tech 1 Racing	Lexus RC F GT3	15	(France) Thomas Neubauer	S	All
(France) Tech 1 Racing	Lexus RC F GT3	15	(France) Aurélien Panis	S	All
(China) Orange1 FFF Racing Team	Lamborghini Huracán GT3 Evo	19	(Japan) Hiroshi Hamaguchi	PA	All
(China) Orange1 FFF Racing Team	Lamborghini Huracán GT3 Evo	19	(United Kingdom) Phil Keen	PA	All
(China) Orange1 FFF Racing Team	Lamborghini Huracán GT3 Evo	19	(Germany) Elia Erhart	PA	2, 4
(China) Orange1 FFF Racing Team	Lamborghini Huracán GT3 Evo	19	(Italy) Raffaele Giammaria	PA	3
(China) Orange1 FFF Racing Team	Lamborghini Huracán GT3 Evo	19	(Italy) Luigi Moccia	PA	3
(China) Orange1 FFF Racing Team	Lamborghini Huracán GT3 Evo	63	(Italy) Andrea Caldarelli	P	All
(China) Orange1 FFF Racing Team	Lamborghini Huracán GT3 Evo	63	(Denmark) Dennis Lind	P	All
(China) Orange1 FFF Racing Team	Lamborghini Huracán GT3 Evo	63	(Italy) Marco Mapelli	P	All
(China) Orange1 FFF Racing Team	Lamborghini Huracán GT3 Evo	555	(Belgium) Baptiste Moulin	S	All
(China) Orange1 FFF Racing Team	Lamborghini Huracán GT3 Evo	555	(France) Florian Latorre	S	1, 3–4
(China) Orange1 FFF Racing Team	Lamborghini Huracán GT3 Evo	555	(Italy) Andrea Amici	S	1
(China) Orange1 FFF Racing Team	Lamborghini Huracán GT3 Evo	555	(Venezuela) Jonathan Cecotto	S	2
(China) Orange1 FFF Racing Team	Lamborghini Huracán GT3 Evo	555	(United Kingdom) Ricky Collard	S	2
(China) Orange1 FFF Racing Team	Lamborghini Huracán GT3 Evo	555	(United Kingdom) Taylor Proto	S	3–4
(China) Orange1 FFF Racing Team	Lamborghini Huracán GT3 Evo	555	(France) Hugo Chevalier	S	3
(Germany) SPS Automotive Performance	Mercedes-AMG GT3 Evo	20	(Austria) Dominik Baumann	PA	3
(Germany) SPS Automotive Performance	Mercedes-AMG GT3 Evo	20	(United States) Colin Braun	PA	3
(Germany) SPS Automotive Performance	Mercedes-AMG GT3 Evo	20	(United States) George Kurtz	PA	3
(Germany) SPS Automotive Performance	Mercedes-AMG GT3 Evo	20	(Germany) Valentin Pierburg	PA	3
(Germany) SPS Automotive Performance	Mercedes-AMG GT3 Evo	44	(Germany) Nico Bastian	PA	1–2
(Germany) SPS Automotive Performance	Mercedes-AMG GT3 Evo	44	(Germany) Christian Hook	PA	1–2
(Germany) SPS Automotive Performance	Mercedes-AMG GT3 Evo	44	(Germany) Florian Scholze	PA	1–2
(Hong Kong) KCMG	Porsche 911 GT3 R	21	(Australia) Josh Burdon	P	2–3
(Hong Kong) KCMG	Porsche 911 GT3 R	21	(Switzerland) Alexandre Imperatori	P	2–3
(Hong Kong) KCMG	Porsche 911 GT3 R	21	(Italy) Edoardo Liberati	P	2–3
(Hong Kong) KCMG	Porsche 911 GT3 R	47	(Denmark) Michael Christensen	P	3
(Hong Kong) KCMG	Porsche 911 GT3 R	47	(France) Kévin Estre	P	3
(Hong Kong) KCMG	Porsche 911 GT3 R	47	(Austria) Richard Lietz	P	3
(Germany) Frikadelli Racing Team	Porsche 911 GT3 R	22	(Germany) Jörg Bergmeister	P	3
(Germany) Frikadelli Racing Team	Porsche 911 GT3 R	22	(France) Frédéric Makowiecki	P	3
(Germany) Frikadelli Racing Team	Porsche 911 GT3 R	22	(Norway) Dennis Olsen	P	3
(Italy) Imperiale Racing	Lamborghini Huracán GT3 Evo	23	(Italy) Kikko Galbiati	P	1
(Italy) Imperiale Racing	Lamborghini Huracán GT3 Evo	23	(Switzerland) Lucas Mauron	P	1
(Italy) Imperiale Racing	Lamborghini Huracán GT3 Evo	23	(Italy) Giovanni Venturini	P	1
(France) / Audi Sport Team Saintéloc (Note: Car No. 25 entered as Saintéloc Racing from Rounds 1 to 2 and as Audi Sport Team Saintéloc at Round 3, car No. 26 entered as Saintéloc Racing.); (France) / Saintéloc Racing	Audi R8 LMS Evo	25	(France) Dorian Boccolacci	P	All
(France) / Audi Sport Team Saintéloc; (France) / Saintéloc Racing	Audi R8 LMS Evo	25	(Germany) Christopher Haase	P	All
(France) / Audi Sport Team Saintéloc; (France) / Saintéloc Racing	Audi R8 LMS Evo	25	(Germany) Markus Winkelhock	P	All
(France) / Audi Sport Team Saintéloc; (France) / Saintéloc Racing	Audi R8 LMS Evo	26	(France) Michael Blanchemain	PA	1
(France) / Audi Sport Team Saintéloc; (France) / Saintéloc Racing	Audi R8 LMS Evo	26	(France) Arthur Rougier	PA	1
(France) / Audi Sport Team Saintéloc; (France) / Saintéloc Racing	Audi R8 LMS Evo	26	(Luxembourg) Clément Seyler	PA	1
(France) / Audi Sport Team Saintéloc; (France) / Saintéloc Racing	Audi R8 LMS Evo	26	(France) Michael Blanchemain	Am	2, 4
(France) / Audi Sport Team Saintéloc; (France) / Saintéloc Racing	Audi R8 LMS Evo	26	(Belgium) Pierre-Yves Paque	Am	2–3
(France) / Audi Sport Team Saintéloc; (France) / Saintéloc Racing	Audi R8 LMS Evo	26	(Luxembourg) Clément Seyler	Am	2
(France) / Audi Sport Team Saintéloc; (France) / Saintéloc Racing	Audi R8 LMS Evo	26	(France) Christophe Cresp	Am	3
(France) / Audi Sport Team Saintéloc; (France) / Saintéloc Racing	Audi R8 LMS Evo	26	(Belgium) Gregory Paisse	Am	3
(France) / Audi Sport Team Saintéloc; (France) / Saintéloc Racing	Audi R8 LMS Evo	26	(France) Steven Palette	Am	3
(France) / Audi Sport Team Saintéloc; (France) / Saintéloc Racing	Audi R8 LMS Evo	26	(France) Christophe Hamon	Am	4
(France) / Audi Sport Team Saintéloc; (France) / Saintéloc Racing	Audi R8 LMS Evo	26	(France) Fabien Michal	Am	4
(Taiwan) HubAuto Corsa	Ferrari 488 GT3	27	(United Kingdom) Tom Blomqvist	P	3
(Taiwan) HubAuto Corsa	Ferrari 488 GT3	27	(Brazil) Marcos Gomes	P	3
(Taiwan) HubAuto Corsa	Ferrari 488 GT3	27	(Japan) Kamui Kobayashi	P	3
(Japan) Team Honda Racing	Honda NSX GT3 Evo	29	(United States) Dane Cameron	P	3
(Japan) Team Honda Racing	Honda NSX GT3 Evo	29	(Germany) Mario Farnbacher	P	3
(Japan) Team Honda Racing	Honda NSX GT3 Evo	29	(Netherlands) Renger van der Zande	P	3
(Belgium) / Audi Sport Team WRT (Note: Car No. 30 entered as Audi Sport Team WRT, car No. 31 entered as Belgian Audi Club Team WRT from Rounds 1 to 2 and as Audi Sport Team WRT at Round 3, car No. 32 entered as Belgian Audi Club Team WRT.); (Belgium) / Belgian Audi Club Team WRT	Audi R8 LMS Evo	30	(Austria) Ferdinand Habsburg	P	3
(Belgium) / Audi Sport Team WRT; (Belgium) / Belgian Audi Club Team WRT	Audi R8 LMS Evo	30	(Germany) Dennis Marschall	P	3
(Belgium) / Audi Sport Team WRT; (Belgium) / Belgian Audi Club Team WRT	Audi R8 LMS Evo	30	(France) Matthieu Vaxiviere	P	3
(Belgium) / Audi Sport Team WRT; (Belgium) / Belgian Audi Club Team WRT	Audi R8 LMS Evo	31	(South Africa) Kelvin van der Linde	P	All
(Belgium) / Audi Sport Team WRT; (Belgium) / Belgian Audi Club Team WRT	Audi R8 LMS Evo	31	(Italy) Mirko Bortolotti	P	1–2, 4
(Belgium) / Audi Sport Team WRT; (Belgium) / Belgian Audi Club Team WRT	Audi R8 LMS Evo	31	(France) Matthieu Vaxiviere	P	1
(Belgium) / Audi Sport Team WRT; (Belgium) / Belgian Audi Club Team WRT	Audi R8 LMS Evo	31	(Switzerland) Rolf Ineichen	P	2, 4
(Belgium) / Audi Sport Team WRT; (Belgium) / Belgian Audi Club Team WRT	Audi R8 LMS Evo	31	(Germany) Christopher Mies	P	3
(Belgium) / Audi Sport Team WRT; (Belgium) / Belgian Audi Club Team WRT	Audi R8 LMS Evo	31	(Belgium) Dries Vanthoor	P	3
(Belgium) / Audi Sport Team WRT; (Belgium) / Belgian Audi Club Team WRT	Audi R8 LMS Evo	32	(Belgium) Charles Weerts	P	All
(Belgium) / Audi Sport Team WRT; (Belgium) / Belgian Audi Club Team WRT	Audi R8 LMS Evo	32	(Germany) Christopher Mies	P	1–2, 4
(Belgium) / Audi Sport Team WRT; (Belgium) / Belgian Audi Club Team WRT	Audi R8 LMS Evo	32	(Belgium) Dries Vanthoor	P	1–2, 4
(Belgium) / Audi Sport Team WRT; (Belgium) / Belgian Audi Club Team WRT	Audi R8 LMS Evo	32	(Switzerland) Edoardo Mortara	P	3
(Belgium) / Audi Sport Team WRT; (Belgium) / Belgian Audi Club Team WRT	Audi R8 LMS Evo	32	(Germany) Frank Stippler	P	3
(United Kingdom) ROFGO Racing with Team WRT	Audi R8 LMS Evo	33	(Netherlands) Rik Breukers	S	All
(United Kingdom) ROFGO Racing with Team WRT	Audi R8 LMS Evo	33	(Denmark) Benjamin Goethe	S	All
(United Kingdom) ROFGO Racing with Team WRT	Audi R8 LMS Evo	33	(United Kingdom) Stuart Hall	S	All
(Germany) Walkenhorst Motorsport	BMW M6 GT3	34	(Netherlands) Nicky Catsburg	P	3
(Germany) Walkenhorst Motorsport	BMW M6 GT3	34	(Austria) Philipp Eng	P	3
(Germany) Walkenhorst Motorsport	BMW M6 GT3	34	(Brazil) Augusto Farfus	P	3
(Germany) Walkenhorst Motorsport	BMW M6 GT3	35	(United Kingdom) David Pittard	P	3
(Germany) Walkenhorst Motorsport	BMW M6 GT3	35	(Germany) Martin Tomczyk	P	3
(Germany) Walkenhorst Motorsport	BMW M6 GT3	35	(United Kingdom) Nick Yelloly	P	3
(Italy) AF Corse	Ferrari 488 GT3	51	(Italy) Alessandro Pier Guidi	P	All
(Italy) AF Corse	Ferrari 488 GT3	51	(United Kingdom) James Calado	P	1–3
(Italy) AF Corse	Ferrari 488 GT3	51	(Denmark) Nicklas Nielsen	P	1–3
(Italy) AF Corse	Ferrari 488 GT3	51	(United Kingdom) Tom Blomqvist	P	4
(Italy) AF Corse	Ferrari 488 GT3	51	(France) Côme Ledogar	P	4
(Italy) AF Corse	Ferrari 488 GT3	52	(Belgium) Louis Machiels	PA	All
(Italy) AF Corse	Ferrari 488 GT3	52	(Italy) Andrea Bertolini	PA	1–3
(Italy) AF Corse	Ferrari 488 GT3	52	(Netherlands) Niek Hommerson	PA	1–3
(Italy) AF Corse	Ferrari 488 GT3	52	(Brazil) Daniel Serra	PA	3
(Italy) AF Corse	Ferrari 488 GT3	52	(Italy) Lorenzo Bontempelli	PA	4
(Italy) AF Corse	Ferrari 488 GT3	52	(Italy) Maurizio Mediani	PA	4
(United Kingdom) Sky - Tempesta Racing	Ferrari 488 GT3	93	(Italy) Eddie Cheever	PA	All
(United Kingdom) Sky - Tempesta Racing	Ferrari 488 GT3	93	(United Kingdom) Chris Froggatt	PA	All
(United Kingdom) Sky - Tempesta Racing	Ferrari 488 GT3	93	(Hong Kong) Jonathan Hui	PA	All
(United Kingdom) Sky - Tempesta Racing	Ferrari 488 GT3	93	(Italy) Giancarlo Fisichella	PA	3
(Italy) Dinamic Motorsport	Porsche 911 GT3 R	54	(Italy) Matteo Cairoli	P	All
(Italy) Dinamic Motorsport	Porsche 911 GT3 R	54	(Germany) Christian Engelhart	P	All
(Italy) Dinamic Motorsport	Porsche 911 GT3 R	54	(Germany) Sven Müller	P	All
(Italy) Dinamic Motorsport	Porsche 911 GT3 R	56	(Belgium) Adrien De Leener	S	All
(Italy) Dinamic Motorsport	Porsche 911 GT3 R	56	(Denmark) Mikkel O. Pedersen	S	All
(Italy) Dinamic Motorsport	Porsche 911 GT3 R	56	(Italy) Andrea Rizzoli	S	All
(Italy) Dinamic Motorsport	Porsche 911 GT3 R	56	(Monaco) Cédric Sbirrazzuoli	S	3
(Italy) Dinamic Motorsport	Porsche 911 GT3 R	67	(Switzerland) Mauro Calamia	PA	1
(Italy) Dinamic Motorsport	Porsche 911 GT3 R	67	(Switzerland) Ivan Jacoma	PA	1
(Italy) Dinamic Motorsport	Porsche 911 GT3 R	67	(Italy) Roberto Pampanini	PA	1
(Germany) / Attempto Racing (Note: Car No. 55 entered as Attempto Racing, Car No. 66 entered as Attempto Racing from Rounds 1 to 2 and as Audi Sort Team Attempto at Round 3.); (Germany) / Audi Sport Team Attempto	Audi R8 LMS Evo	55	(Germany) Alex Aka	S	All
(Germany) / Attempto Racing; (Germany) / Audi Sport Team Attempto	Audi R8 LMS Evo	55	(Austria) Nicolas Schöll	S	All
(Germany) / Attempto Racing; (Germany) / Audi Sport Team Attempto	Audi R8 LMS Evo	55	(Italy) Tommaso Mosca	S	1
(Germany) / Attempto Racing; (Germany) / Audi Sport Team Attempto	Audi R8 LMS Evo	55	(United Kingdom) Finlay Hutchison	S	2–4
(Germany) / Attempto Racing; (Germany) / Audi Sport Team Attempto	Audi R8 LMS Evo	55	(France) Simon Gachet	S	3
(Germany) / Attempto Racing; (Germany) / Audi Sport Team Attempto	Audi R8 LMS Evo	66	(Italy) Mattia Drudi	P	All
(Germany) / Attempto Racing; (Germany) / Audi Sport Team Attempto	Audi R8 LMS Evo	66	(Belgium) Frédéric Vervisch	P	All
(Germany) / Attempto Racing; (Germany) / Audi Sport Team Attempto	Audi R8 LMS Evo	66	(Germany) Kim-Luis Schramm	P	1–2, 4
(Germany) / Attempto Racing; (Germany) / Audi Sport Team Attempto	Audi R8 LMS Evo	66	(Switzerland) Patric Niederhauser	P	3
(Australia) Ema Group/Team 59Racing	McLaren 720S GT3	60	(United Kingdom) Ben Barnicoat	P	1
(Australia) Ema Group/Team 59Racing	McLaren 720S GT3	60	(Croatia) Martin Kodrić	P	1
(Australia) Ema Group/Team 59Racing	McLaren 720S GT3	60	(United Kingdom) Lewis Williamson	P	1
(United Kingdom) Optimum Motorsport	McLaren 720S GT3	69	(United Kingdom) Rob Bell	P	1–3
(United Kingdom) Optimum Motorsport	McLaren 720S GT3	69	(United Kingdom) Joe Osborne	P	1–3
(United Kingdom) Optimum Motorsport	McLaren 720S GT3	69	(United Kingdom) Ollie Wilkinson	P	1–3
(Russia) SMP Racing	Ferrari 488 GT3	72	(Russia) Sergey Sirotkin	P	All
(Russia) SMP Racing	Ferrari 488 GT3	72	(Spain) Miguel Molina	P	1–3
(Russia) SMP Racing	Ferrari 488 GT3	72	(Italy) Davide Rigon	P	1–3
(Russia) SMP Racing	Ferrari 488 GT3	72	(Italy) Antonio Fuoco	P	4
(Russia) SMP Racing	Ferrari 488 GT3	72	(Finland) Toni Vilander	P	4
(United Kingdom) Ram Racing	Mercedes-AMG GT3 Evo	74	(United Kingdom) Tom Onslow-Cole	PA	All
(United Kingdom) Ram Racing	Mercedes-AMG GT3 Evo	74	(Netherlands) Remon Vos	PA	All
(United Kingdom) Ram Racing	Mercedes-AMG GT3 Evo	74	(Austria) Martin Konrad	PA	2–4
(United Kingdom) Ram Racing	Mercedes-AMG GT3 Evo	74	(United Kingdom) Callum MacLeod	PA	3
(United Kingdom) Barwell Motorsport	Lamborghini Huracán GT3 Evo	77	(United Kingdom) Rob Collard	PA	All
(United Kingdom) Barwell Motorsport	Lamborghini Huracán GT3 Evo	77	(Russia) Leo Machitski	PA	All
(United Kingdom) Barwell Motorsport	Lamborghini Huracán GT3 Evo	77	(United Kingdom) Sandy Mitchell	PA	All
(United Kingdom) Barwell Motorsport	Lamborghini Huracán GT3 Evo	77	(United Kingdom) Ricky Collard	PA	3
(United Kingdom) Barwell Motorsport	Lamborghini Huracán GT3 Evo	78	(Finland) Patrick Kujala	S	All
(United Kingdom) Barwell Motorsport	Lamborghini Huracán GT3 Evo	78	(United Kingdom) Alex MacDowall	S	All
(United Kingdom) Barwell Motorsport	Lamborghini Huracán GT3 Evo	78	(Denmark) Frederik Schandorff	S	All
(Germany) HTP Motorsport	Mercedes-AMG GT3 Evo	84	(Netherlands) Indy Dontje	S	3
(Germany) HTP Motorsport	Mercedes-AMG GT3 Evo	84	(United Kingdom) Philip Ellis	S	3
(Germany) HTP Motorsport	Mercedes-AMG GT3 Evo	84	(United States) Russell Ward	S	3
(France) / AKKA ASP Team (Note: Car Nos. 87 and 89 entered as AKKA ASP Team, car No. 88 entered as AKKA ASP Team from Rounds 1 to 2 and as Mercedes-AMG Team AKKA ASP at Round 3.); (France) / Mercedes-AMG Team AKKA ASP	Mercedes-AMG GT3 Evo	87	(France) Fabien Barthez	PA	1–3
(France) / AKKA ASP Team; (France) / Mercedes-AMG Team AKKA ASP	Mercedes-AMG GT3 Evo	87	(France) Jim Pla	PA	1–3
(France) / AKKA ASP Team; (France) / Mercedes-AMG Team AKKA ASP	Mercedes-AMG GT3 Evo	87	(France) Jean-Luc Beaubelique	PA	1, 3
(France) / AKKA ASP Team; (France) / Mercedes-AMG Team AKKA ASP	Mercedes-AMG GT3 Evo	87	(France) Thomas Drouet	PA	2–3
(France) / AKKA ASP Team; (France) / Mercedes-AMG Team AKKA ASP	Mercedes-AMG GT3 Evo	88	(Russia) Timur Boguslavskiy	P	All
(France) / AKKA ASP Team; (France) / Mercedes-AMG Team AKKA ASP	Mercedes-AMG GT3 Evo	88	(Italy) Raffaele Marciello	P	All
(France) / AKKA ASP Team; (France) / Mercedes-AMG Team AKKA ASP	Mercedes-AMG GT3 Evo	88	(Brazil) Felipe Fraga	P	1–3
(France) / AKKA ASP Team; (France) / Mercedes-AMG Team AKKA ASP	Mercedes-AMG GT3 Evo	88	(Germany) Maximilian Buhk	P	4
(France) / AKKA ASP Team; (France) / Mercedes-AMG Team AKKA ASP	Mercedes-AMG GT3 Evo	89	(Switzerland) Alex Fontana	S	All
(France) / AKKA ASP Team; (France) / Mercedes-AMG Team AKKA ASP	Mercedes-AMG GT3 Evo	89	(Chile) Benjamín Hites	S	All
(France) / AKKA ASP Team; (France) / Mercedes-AMG Team AKKA ASP	Mercedes-AMG GT3 Evo	89	(Switzerland) Lucas Légeret	S	All
(Spain) Madpanda Motorsport	Mercedes-AMG GT3 Evo	90	(Germany) Patrick Assenheimer	S	All
(Spain) Madpanda Motorsport	Mercedes-AMG GT3 Evo	90	(Argentina) Ezequiel Pérez Companc	S	All
(Spain) Madpanda Motorsport	Mercedes-AMG GT3 Evo	90	(Spain) Jorge Cabezas Catalán	S	1
(Spain) Madpanda Motorsport	Mercedes-AMG GT3 Evo	90	(France) Romain Monti	S	2
(Spain) Madpanda Motorsport	Mercedes-AMG GT3 Evo	90	(Finland) Juuso Puhakka	S	3
(Spain) Madpanda Motorsport	Mercedes-AMG GT3 Evo	90	(Mexico) Ricardo Sanchez	S	3
(Germany) Rinaldi Racing	Ferrari 488 GT3	95	(Germany) Christian Hook	PA	4
(Germany) Rinaldi Racing	Ferrari 488 GT3	95	(Germany) Manuel Lauck	PA	4
(Germany) Rinaldi Racing	Ferrari 488 GT3	95	(South Africa) David Perel	PA	4
(Germany) Rinaldi Racing	Ferrari 488 GT3	488	(Germany) Pierre Ehret	PA	All
(Germany) Rinaldi Racing	Ferrari 488 GT3	488	(Germany) Daniel Keilwitz	PA	All
(Germany) Rinaldi Racing	Ferrari 488 GT3	488	(Italy) Rino Mastronardi	PA	All
(Germany) Rinaldi Racing	Ferrari 488 GT3	488	(South Africa) David Perel	PA	3
(Germany) Rowe Racing	Porsche 911 GT3 R	98	(Germany) Timo Bernhard	P	2
(Germany) Rowe Racing	Porsche 911 GT3 R	98	(Netherlands) Jeroen Bleekemolen	P	2
(Germany) Rowe Racing	Porsche 911 GT3 R	98	(Switzerland) Simona de Silvestro	P	2
(Germany) Rowe Racing	Porsche 911 GT3 R	98	(New Zealand) Earl Bamber	P	3
(Germany) Rowe Racing	Porsche 911 GT3 R	98	(United Kingdom) Nick Tandy	P	3
(Germany) Rowe Racing	Porsche 911 GT3 R	98	(Belgium) Laurens Vanthoor	P	3
(Germany) Rowe Racing	Porsche 911 GT3 R	99	(France) Julien Andlauer	P	1, 3
(Germany) Rowe Racing	Porsche 911 GT3 R	99	(Austria) Klaus Bachler	P	1, 3
(Germany) Rowe Racing	Porsche 911 GT3 R	99	(Germany) Dirk Werner	P	1, 3
(Germany) GetSpeed Performance	Mercedes-AMG GT3 Evo	100	(Italy) Alessio Lorandi	P	1–2, 4
(Germany) GetSpeed Performance	Mercedes-AMG GT3 Evo	100	(Germany) Fabian Schiller	P	1–2, 4
(Germany) GetSpeed Performance	Mercedes-AMG GT3 Evo	100	(Germany) Maximilian Buhk	P	1–2
(Germany) GetSpeed Performance	Mercedes-AMG GT3 Evo	100	(Netherlands) Yelmer Buurman	P	4
(France) CMR	Bentley Continental GT3	107	(France) Pierre-Alexandre Jean	P	All
(France) CMR	Bentley Continental GT3	107	(United Kingdom) Seb Morris	P	All
(France) CMR	Bentley Continental GT3	107	(Romania) Petru Umbrărescu	P	1
(France) CMR	Bentley Continental GT3	107	(France) Nelson Panciatici	P	2–4
(France) CMR	Bentley Continental GT3	108	(France) Stephane Tribaudini	Am	1, 3–4
(France) CMR	Bentley Continental GT3	108	(France) Romano Ricci	Am	1, 3
(France) CMR	Bentley Continental GT3	108	(Belgium) Bernhard Delhez	Am	1
(France) CMR	Bentley Continental GT3	108	(Belgium) Stéphane Lémeret	Am	3
(France) CMR	Bentley Continental GT3	108	(France) Clement Mateu	Am	3
(France) CMR	Bentley Continental GT3	108	(France) Philippe Chatelet	Am	4
(France) CMR	Bentley Continental GT3	108	(France) Nicolas Misslin	Am	4
(France) CMR	Bentley Continental GT3	108	(Romania) Petru Umbrărescu	PA	2
(France) CMR	Bentley Continental GT3	108	(France) Romano Ricci	PA	2
(France) CMR	Bentley Continental GT3	108	(France) Stephane Tribaudini	PA	2
(Poland) JP Motorsport	Mercedes-AMG GT3	111	(Austria) Christian Klien	PA	2–3
(Poland) JP Motorsport	Mercedes-AMG GT3	111	(Poland) Patryk Krupińsky	PA	2–3
(Poland) JP Motorsport	Mercedes-AMG GT3	111	(Austria) Mathias Lauda	PA	2–3
(Poland) JP Motorsport	Mercedes-AMG GT3	111	(Germany) Jens Liebhauser	PA	3
(Italy) Raton Racing	Lamborghini Huracán GT3 Evo	129	(Italy) Stefano Costantini	Am	3
(Italy) Raton Racing	Lamborghini Huracán GT3 Evo	129	(Switzerland) Christoph Lenz	Am	3
(Italy) Raton Racing	Lamborghini Huracán GT3 Evo	129	(Switzerland) Lucas Mauron	Am	3
(Italy) Raton Racing	Lamborghini Huracán GT3 Evo	129	(France) Michael Petit	Am	3
(United Kingdom) Garage 59	Aston Martin Vantage AMR GT3	159	(France) Valentin Hasse-Clot	S	All
(United Kingdom) Garage 59	Aston Martin Vantage AMR GT3	159	(United Kingdom) Andrew Watson	S	All
(United Kingdom) Garage 59	Aston Martin Vantage AMR GT3	159	(United Kingdom) James Pull	S	2–4
(United Kingdom) Garage 59	Aston Martin Vantage AMR GT3	159	(Canada) Roman De Angelis	S	3
(United Kingdom) Garage 59	Aston Martin Vantage AMR GT3	188	(United Kingdom) Chris Goodwin	PA	All
(United Kingdom) Garage 59	Aston Martin Vantage AMR GT3	188	(Sweden) Alexander West	PA	All
(United Kingdom) Garage 59	Aston Martin Vantage AMR GT3	188	(United Kingdom) Jonathan Adam	PA	1–3
(United Kingdom) Garage 59	Aston Martin Vantage AMR GT3	188	(Belgium) Maxime Martin	PA	3
(United Kingdom) Garage 59	Aston Martin Vantage AMR GT3	188	(Germany) Marvin Kirchhöfer	PA	4
(Germany) Precote Herberth Motorsport	Porsche 911 GT3 R	918	(Germany) Jürgen Häring	Am	3
(Germany) Precote Herberth Motorsport	Porsche 911 GT3 R	918	(Germany) Michael Joos	Am	3
(Germany) Precote Herberth Motorsport	Porsche 911 GT3 R	918	(Greece) Dimitrios Konstantinou	Am	3
(Germany) Precote Herberth Motorsport	Porsche 911 GT3 R	918	(Germany) Marco Seefried	Am	3
(Germany) Precote Herberth Motorsport	Porsche 911 GT3 R	991	(Switzerland) Daniel Allemann	PA	2–3
(Germany) Precote Herberth Motorsport	Porsche 911 GT3 R	991	(Germany) Ralf Bohn	PA	2–3
(Germany) Precote Herberth Motorsport	Porsche 911 GT3 R	991	(Germany) Robert Renauer	PA	2–3
(Germany) Precote Herberth Motorsport	Porsche 911 GT3 R	991	(Germany) Alfred Renauer	PA	3
(Germany) Precote Herberth Motorsport	Porsche 911 GT3 R	992	(Germany) Jürgen Häring	PA	2
(Germany) Precote Herberth Motorsport	Porsche 911 GT3 R	992	(Greece) Dimitrios Konstantinou	PA	2
(Germany) Precote Herberth Motorsport	Porsche 911 GT3 R	992	(Germany) Alfred Renauer	PA	2

Icon	Class
P	Pro Cup
S	Silver Cup
PA	Pro-Am Cup
Am	Am Cup

== Race results ==
Bold indicates the overall winner.

Round	Circuit	Pole position	Pro winners	Silver winners	Pro/Am winners	Am winners
1	(Italy) Imola	(Germany) No. 66 Attempto Racing	**(Belgium) No. 31 Belgian Audi Club Team WRT**	(United Kingdom) No. 78 Barwell Motorsport	(United Kingdom) No. 188 Garage 59	(France) No. 108 CMR
1	(Italy) Imola	(Italy) Mattia Drudi (Germany) Kim-Luis Schramm (Belgium) Frédéric Vervisch	**(Italy) Mirko Bortolotti** **(South Africa) Kelvin van der Linde** **(France) Matthieu Vaxiviere**	(Finland) Patrick Kujala (United Kingdom) Alex MacDowall (Denmark) Frederik Schandorff	(United Kingdom) Jonathan Adam (United Kingdom) Chris Goodwin (Sweden) Alexander West	(Belgium) Bernhard Delhez (France) Romano Ricci (France) Stephane Tribaudini
2	(Germany) Nürburgring	(United Arab Emirates) No. 40 GPX Racing	**(Italy) No. 54 Dinamic Motorsport**	(United Kingdom) No. 159 Garage 59	(China) No. 19 Orange1 FFF Racing Team	(France) No. 26 Saintéloc Racing
2	(Germany) Nürburgring	(France) Romain Dumas (Norway) Dennis Olsen (Austria) Thomas Preining	**(Italy) Matteo Cairoli** **(Germany) Christian Engelhart** **(Germany) Sven Müller**	(France) Valentin Hasse-Clot (United Kingdom) James Pull (United Kingdom) Andrew Watson	(Germany) Elia Erhart (Japan) Hiroshi Hamaguchi (United Kingdom) Phil Keen	(France) Michael Blanchemain (Belgium) Pierre-Yves Paque (Luxembourg) Clément Seyler
3	(Belgium) Spa-Francorchamps	(France) No. 88 Mercedes-AMG Team AKKA ASP	**(Germany) No. 98 Rowe Racing**	(Germany) No. 5 Haupt Racing Team	(United Kingdom) No. 77 Barwell Motorsport	(France) No. 108 CMR
3	(Belgium) Spa-Francorchamps	(Russia) Timur Boguslavskiy (Brazil) Felipe Fraga (Italy) Raffaele Marciello	**(New Zealand) Earl Bamber** **(United Kingdom) Nick Tandy** **(Belgium) Laurens Vanthoor**	(Russia) Sergey Afanasyev (Italy) Michele Beretta (Germany) Hubert Haupt (Italy) Gabriele Piana	(United Kingdom) Ricky Collard (United Kingdom) Rob Collard (Russia) Leo Machitski (United Kingdom) Sandy Mitchell	(Belgium) Stéphane Lémeret (France) Clement Mateu (France) Romano Ricci (France) Stephane Tribaudini
4	(France) Paul Ricard	(Russia) No. 72 SMP Racing	**(Italy) No. 51 AF Corse**	(United Kingdom) No. 78 Barwell Motorsport	(United Kingdom) No. 188 Garage 59	(France) No. 108 CMR
4	(France) Paul Ricard	(Italy) Antonio Fuoco (Russia) Sergey Sirotkin (Finland) Toni Vilander	**(United Kingdom) Tom Blomqvist** **(France) Côme Ledogar** **(Italy) Alessandro Pier Guidi**	(Finland) Patrick Kujala (United Kingdom) Alex MacDowall (Denmark) Frederik Schandorff	(United Kingdom) Chris Goodwin (Germany) Marvin Kirchhöfer (Sweden) Alexander West	(France) Philippe Chatelet (France) Nicolas Misslin (France) Stephane Tribaudini

== Championship standings ==
Scoring system

Championship points are awarded for the first ten positions in each race. The pole-sitter also receives one point and entries are required to complete 75% of the winning car's race distance in order to be classified and earn points. Individual drivers are required to participate for a minimum of 25 minutes in order to earn championship points in any race.

Imola points

Position	1st	2nd	3rd	4th	5th	6th	7th	8th	9th	10th	Pole
Points	25	18	15	12	10	8	6	4	2	1	1

Nürburgring & Paul Ricard points

Position	1st	2nd	3rd	4th	5th	6th	7th	8th	9th	10th	Pole
Points	33	24	19	15	12	9	6	4	2	1	1

24 Hours of Spa points

Points are awarded after six hours, after twelve hours and at the finish.

Position	1st	2nd	3rd	4th	5th	6th	7th	8th	9th	10th	Pole
Points after 6hrs/12hrs	12	9	7	6	5	4	3	2	1	0	1
Points at the finish	25	18	15	12	10	8	6	4	2	1	1

=== Drivers' championships ===
==== Overall ====
Pos.	Drivers	Team	IMO (Italy)	NÜR (Germany)	SPA (Belgium)			LEC (France)	Points
Pos.	Drivers	Team	IMO (Italy)	NÜR (Germany)	6hrs	12hrs	24hrs	LEC (France)	Points
1	(Italy) Alessandro Pier Guidi	(Italy) AF Corse	7 (Note: A drive-through penalty was wrongfully handed out to Calado, Nielsen and Pier Guidi at Imola. A request by the AF Corse team to be awarded with points for second place was accepted by the sporting board.)	Ret	4	1	5	1	79
2	(Australia) Matt Campbell (France) Mathieu Jaminet (France) Patrick Pilet	(United Arab Emirates) GPX Racing	2	Ret	3	6	4	2	65
3	(Italy) Matteo Cairoli (Germany) Christian Engelhart (Germany) Sven Müller	(Italy) Dinamic Motorsport	10	1	13	7	3	10	53
4	(South Africa) Kelvin van der Linde	(Belgium) Belgian Audi Club Team WRT	1	4				5	52
4	(South Africa) Kelvin van der Linde	(Belgium) Audi Sport Team WRT			24	49	Ret		52
4	(Italy) Mirko Bortolotti	(Belgium) Belgian Audi Club Team WRT	1	4				5	52
5	(Russia) Timur Boguslavskiy (Italy) Raffaele Marciello	(France) AKKA ASP	3	2				18	52
5	(Russia) Timur Boguslavskiy (Italy) Raffaele Marciello	(France) Mercedes-AMG Team AKKA ASP			1	37	Ret^{P}		52
5	(Brazil) Felipe Fraga	(France) AKKA ASP	3	2					52
5	(Brazil) Felipe Fraga	(France) Mercedes-AMG Team AKKA ASP			1	37	Ret^{P}		52
6	(United Kingdom) James Calado (Denmark) Nicklas Nielsen	(Italy) AF Corse	7	Ret	4	1	5		46
7	(France) Vincent Abril (Germany) Maro Engel (Germany) Luca Stolz	(Germany) Haupt Racing Team	15	3				6	40
7	(France) Vincent Abril (Germany) Maro Engel (Germany) Luca Stolz	(Germany) Mercedes-AMG Team HRT			12	4	7		40
8	(Germany) Christopher Mies (Belgium) Dries Vanthoor	(Belgium) Belgian Audi Club Team WRT	4	5				4^{F}	39
8	(Germany) Christopher Mies (Belgium) Dries Vanthoor	(Belgium) Audi Sport Team WRT			24	49	Ret		39
8	(Belgium) Charles Weerts	(Belgium) Belgian Audi Club Team WRT	4	5	54	54	Ret	4^{F}	39
9	(Italy) Andrea Caldarelli (Denmark) Dennis Lind (Italy) Marco Mapelli	(China) Orange1 FFF Racing Team	Ret	16	2	2	38^{F}	3	37
10	(New Zealand) Earl Bamber (United Kingdom) Nick Tandy (Belgium) Laurens Vanthoor	(Germany) Rowe Racing			9	3	1		33
10	(United Kingdom) Tom Blomqvist	(Taiwan) HubAuto Corsa			22	17	23		33
10	(United Kingdom) Tom Blomqvist	(Italy) AF Corse						1	33
10	(France) Côme Ledogar	(Italy) AF Corse						1	33
11	(Switzerland) Rolf Ineichen	(Belgium) Belgian Audi Club Team WRT		4				5	27
12	(Italy) Mattia Drudi (Belgium) Frédéric Vervisch	(Germany) Attempto Racing	36^{PF}	Ret				9	26
12	(Italy) Mattia Drudi (Belgium) Frédéric Vervisch	(Germany) Audi Sport Team Attempto Racing			5	10	2		26
13	(France) Matthieu Vaxiviere	(Belgium) Belgian Audi Club Team WRT	1						25
13	(France) Matthieu Vaxiviere	(Belgium) Audi Sport Team WRT			29	21	14		25
14	(Switzerland) Patric Niederhauser	(Germany) Audi Sport Team Attempto Racing			5	10	2		23
15	(France) Dorian Boccolacci (Germany) Christopher Haase (Germany) Markus Winkelhock	(France) Saintéloc Racing	5	10				12	22
15	(France) Dorian Boccolacci (Germany) Christopher Haase (Germany) Markus Winkelhock	(France) Audi Sport Team Saintéloc Racing			15	8	6		22
16	(South Africa) Jordan Pepper	(United States) Bentley K-PAX Racing	17	6	10	5	10	13	15
17	(Spain) Andy Soucek	(United States) Bentley K-PAX Racing	17	6	30	16	12	13	9
17	(United Kingdom) Alex Buncombe	(United States) Bentley K-PAX Racing		6					9
18	(France) Julien Andlauer (Austria) Klaus Bachler (Germany) Dirk Werner	(Germany) Rowe Racing	6	WD	19	14	32		8
19	(Italy) Giacomo Altoè (Spain) Albert Costa	(Switzerland) Emil Frey Racing	18	Ret	6	11	31	8	8
20	(Russia) Sergey Sirotkin	(Russia) SMP Racing	20	14	14	13	19	7^{P}	7
20	(Italy) Antonio Fuoco (Finland) Toni Vilander	(Russia) SMP Racing						7^{P}	7
21	(Italy) Alessio Lorandi (Germany) Fabian Schiller	(Germany) GetSpeed Performance	39	7				15	6
21	(Germany) Maximilian Buhk	(Germany) GetSpeed Performance	39	7					6
21	(Germany) Maximilian Buhk	(France) AKKA ASP						18	6
22	(Norway) Dennis Olsen	(United Arab Emirates) GPX Racing		19^{PF}					6
22	(Norway) Dennis Olsen	(Germany) Frikadelli Racing Team			11	9	8		6
23	(France) Jules Gounon (Belgium) Maxime Soulet	(United States) Bentley K-PAX Racing	30	Ret	10	5	10	Ret	6
24	(United Kingdom) Rob Bell (United Kingdom) Joe Osborne (United Kingdom) Ollie Wilkinson	(United Kingdom) Optimum Motorsport	8	11	51	46	Ret		5
25	(Germany) Jörg Bergmeister (France) Frédéric Makowiecki	(Germany) Frikadelli Racing Team			11	9	8		5
26	(United States) Dane Cameron (Germany) Mario Farnbacher (Netherlands) Renger van der Zande	(Italy) Team Honda Racing			7	12	9		5
27	(Australia) Josh Burdon (Switzerland) Alexandre Imperatori (Italy) Edoardo Liberati	(Hong Kong) KCMG		9	52	47	Ret		4
28	(France) Franck Perera	(Switzerland) Emil Frey Racing	18	Ret	6	11	31		4
29	(Denmark) Mikkel Mac	(Switzerland) Emil Frey Racing						8	4
30	(France) Romain Dumas (Austria) Thomas Preining	(United Arab Emirates) GPX Racing	9	19^{PF}	11	15	11	Ret	3
31	(Germany) Kim-Luis Schramm	(Germany) Attempto Racing	36^{PF}	Ret				9	3
32	(Switzerland) Louis Delétraz	(United Arab Emirates) GPX Racing	9		11	15	11	Ret	2
33	(Denmark) Michael Christensen (France) Kévin Estre (Austria) Richard Lietz	(Hong Kong) KCMG			8	26	13		2
	(Switzerland) Ricardo Feller (Canada) Mikaël Grenier (Austria) Norbert Siedler	(Switzerland) Emil Frey Racing	11	Ret	39	31	16	11	0
	(Finland) Patrick Kujala (United Kingdom) Alex MacDowall (Denmark) Frederik Schandorff	(United Kingdom) Barwell Motorsport	12	13	18	23	36	14	0
	(Portugal) Álvaro Parente	(United States) Bentley K-PAX Racing	17		30	16	12	13	0
	(France) Valentin Hasse-Clot (United Kingdom) Andrew Watson	(United Kingdom) Garage 59	14	12	25	44	Ret	Ret	0
	(Brazil) Rodrigo Baptista	(United States) Bentley K-PAX Racing	30	Ret	30	16	12	Ret	0
	(United Kingdom) James Pull	(United Kingdom) Garage 59		12	25	44	Ret	Ret	0
	(Spain) Miguel Molina (Italy) Davide Rigon	(Russia) SMP Racing	20	14	14	13	19		0
	(United Kingdom) Chris Goodwin (Sweden) Alexander West	(United Kingdom) Garage 59	13	33	17	24	20	20	0
	(United Kingdom) Jonathan Adam	(United Kingdom) Garage 59	13	33	17	24	20		0
	(Austria) Ferdinand Habsburg (Germany) Dennis Marschall	(Belgium) Audi Sport Team WRT			29	21	14		0
	(United Kingdom) Rob Collard (Russia) Leo Machitski (United Kingdom) Sandy Mitchell	(United Kingdom) Barwell Motorsport	34	25	26	22	15	22	0
	(United Kingdom) Ricky Collard	(China) Orange1 FFF Racing Team		28					0
	(United Kingdom) Ricky Collard	(United Kingdom) Barwell Motorsport			26	22	15		0
	(France) Pierre-Alexandre Jean (United Kingdom) Seb Morris	(France) CMR	Ret	15	49	41	33	Ret	0
	(France) Nelson Panciatici	(France) CMR		15	49	41	33	Ret	0
	(Netherlands) Yelmer Buurman	(Germany) GetSpeed Performance						15	0
	(France) Timothé Buret (France) Thomas Neubauer (France) Aurélien Panis	(France) Tech 1 Racing	19	39	28	43	Ret	16	0
	(Belgium) Adrien De Leener (Denmark) Mikkel O. Pedersen (Italy) Andrea Rizzoli	(Italy) Dinamic Motorsport	16	31	38	48	Ret	23	0
	(Russia) Sergey Afanasyev (Germany) Hubert Haupt	(Germany) Haupt Racing Team	Ret	26	20	20	18	17	0
	(Italy) Michele Beretta	(Germany) Haupt Racing Team			20	20	18	17	0
	(Italy) Eddie Cheever (United Kingdom) Chris Froggatt (Hong Kong) Jonathan Hui	(United Kingdom) Sky - Tempesta Racing	23	32	21	19	17	24	0
	(Italy) Giancarlo Fisichella	(United Kingdom) Sky - Tempesta Racing			21	19	17		0
	(Belgium) Maxime Martin	(United Kingdom) Garage 59			17	24	20		0
	(Brazil) Marcos Gomes (Japan) Kamui Kobayashi	(Taiwan) HubAuto Corsa			22	17	23		0
	(Germany) Patrick Assenheimer (Argentina) Ezequiel Pérez Companc	(Spain) Madpanda Motorsport	22	17	41	34	26	25	0
	(France) Romain Monti	(Spain) Madpanda Motorsport		17					0
	(Italy) Gabriele Piana	(Germany) Haupt Racing Team			20	20	18		0
	(United Kingdom) Nick Yelloly	(Belgium) Boutsen Ginion Racing	27						0
	(United Kingdom) Nick Yelloly	(Germany) Walkenhorst Motorsport			23	18	Ret		0
	(United Kingdom) David Pittard (Germany) Martin Tomczyk	(Germany) Walkenhorst Motorsport			23	18	Ret		0
	(Japan) Hiroshi Hamaguchi (United Kingdom) Phil Keen	(China) Orange1 FFF Racing Team	33	18	55	55	Ret	27	0
	(Germany) Elia Erhart	(China) Orange1 FFF Racing Team		18				27	0
	(Netherlands) Rik Breukers (Denmark) Benjamin Goethe (United Kingdom) Stuart Hall	(United Kingdom) ROFGO Racing with WRT	32	Ret	34	35	34	19	0
	(Switzerland) Daniel Allemann (Germany) Ralf Bohn (Germany) Robert Renauer	(Germany) Precote Herberth Motorsport		20	35	28	37		0
	(Germany) Marvin Kirchhöfer	(United Kingdom) Garage 59						20	0
	(Belgium) Baptiste Moulin	(China) Orange1 FFF Racing Team	21	28	31	32	24	26	0
	(Netherlands) Indy Dontje (United Kingdom) Philip Ellis (United States) Russell Ward	(Germany) HTP Motorsport			36	27	21		0
	(Chile) Benjamín Hites (Switzerland) Lucas Légeret (Switzerland) Alex Fontana	(France) AKKA ASP	38	38	27	39	29	21	0
	(France) Fabien Barthez (France) Jim Pla	(France) AKKA ASP	Ret	21	53	42	Ret		0
	(France) Florian Latorre	(China) Orange1 FFF Racing Team	21		31	32	24	26	0
	(France) Thomas Drouet	(France) AKKA ASP		21	53	42	Ret		0
	(Italy) Andrea Amici	(China) Orange1 FFF Racing Team	21						0
	(Germany) Pierre Ehret (Germany) Daniel Keilwitz (Italy) Rino Mastronardi	(Germany) Rinaldi Racing	25	27	40	33	22	Ret	0
	(United Kingdom) Tom Onslow-Cole (Netherlands) Remon Vos	(United Kingdom) Ram Racing	Ret	22	48	52	Ret	28	0
	(Austria) Martin Konrad	(United Kingdom) Ram Racing		22	48	52	Ret	28	0
	(South Africa) David Perel	(Germany) Rinaldi Racing			40	33	22	Ret	0
	(Spain) Jorge Cabezas	(Spain) Madpanda Motorsport	22						0
	(Belgium) Louis Machiels	(Italy) AF Corse	26	23	32	29	35	Ret	0
	(Italy) Andrea Bertolini (Netherlands) Niek Hommerson	(Italy) AF Corse	26	23	32	29	35		0
	(United Kingdom) Taylor Proto	(China) Orange1 FFF Racing Team			31	32	24	26	0
	(Germany) Alex Aka (Austria) Nicolas Schöll	(Germany) Attempto Racing	28	24	56	56	Ret	Ret	0
	(France) Michael Blanchemain	(France) Saintéloc Racing	24	36				30	0
	(France) Hugo Chevalier	(China) Orange1 FFF Racing Team			31	32	24		0
	(Luxembourg) Clément Seyler	(France) Saintéloc Racing	24	36					0
	(United Kingdom) Finlay Hutchison	(Germany) Haupt Racing Team	Ret						0
	(United Kingdom) Finlay Hutchison	(Germany) Attempto Racing		24	56	56	Ret	Ret	0
	(France) Arthur Rougier	(France) Saintéloc Racing	24						0
	(Saudi Arabia) Karim Ojjeh (France) Gilles Vannelet	(Belgium) Boutsen Ginion Racing	27	Ret	33	25	25	Ret	0
	(Germany) Jens Klingmann	(Belgium) Boutsen Ginion Racing		Ret	33	25	25	Ret	0
	(Belgium) Benjamin Lessennes	(Belgium) Boutsen Ginion Racing			33	25	25		0
	(Canada) Roman De Angelis	(United Kingdom) Garage 59			25	44	Ret		0
	(Finland) Juuso Puhakka (Mexico) Ricardo Sanchez	(Spain) Madpanda Motorsport			41	34	26		0
	(Switzerland) Joël Camathias	(Germany) Haupt Racing Team		26					0
	(Austria) Dominik Baumann (United States) Colin Braun (United States) George Kurtz (Germany) Valentin Pierburg	(Germany) SPS Automotive Performance			45	36	27		0
	(United Kingdom) Frank Bird (Denmark) Nicolai Kjærgaard (United Kingdom) Euan McKay	(United Kingdom) Team Parker Racing	37	37	37	30	28	Ret	0
	(Germany) Alfred Renauer	(Germany) Precote Herberth Motorsport		34	35	28	37		0
	(Italy) Tommaso Mosca	(Germany) Attempto Racing	28						0
	(Venezuela) Jonathan Cecotto	(China) Orange1 FFF Racing Team		28					0
	(France) Stephane Tribaudini	(France) CMR	31	29	46	38	30	29	0
	(France) Romano Ricci	(France) CMR	31	29	46	38	30		0
	(Brazil) Daniel Serra	(Italy) AF Corse			32	29	35		0
	(Romania) Petru Umbrărescu	(France) CMR	Ret	29					0
	(Switzerland) Mauro Calamia (Switzerland) Ivan Jacoma (Italy) Roberto Pampanini	(Italy) Dinamic Motorsport	29						0
	(France) Philippe Chatelet (France) Nicolas Misslin	(France) CMR						29	0
	(Belgium) Stéphane Lémeret (France) Clement Mateu	(France) CMR			46	38	30		0
	(Germany) Christian Hook	(Germany) SPS Automotive Performance	Ret	30					0
	(Germany) Christian Hook	(Germany) Rinaldi Racing						Ret	0
	(Germany) Nico Bastian (Germany) Florian Scholze	(Germany) SPS Automotive Performance	Ret	30					0
	(France) Christophe Hamon (France) Fabien Michal	(France) Saintéloc Racing						30	0
	(Belgium) Bernhard Delhez	(France) CMR	31						0
	(Germany) Jürgen Häring (Greece) Dimitrios Konstantinou	(Germany) Precote Herberth Motorsport		34	44	45	Ret		0
	(United Kingdom) Ben Barnicoat (Croatia) Martin Kodrić (United Kingdom) Lewis Williamson	(Australia) Ema Group/Team 59Racing	35						0
	(Austria) Christian Klien (Poland) Patryk Krupińsky (Austria) Mathias Lauda	(Poland) JP Motorsport		35	42	50	Ret		0
	(Belgium) Pierre-Yves Paque	(France) Saintéloc Racing		36	47	51	Ret		0
	(Monaco) Cédric Sbirrazzuoli	(Italy) Dinamic Motorsport			38	48	Ret		0
	(Switzerland) Lucas Mauron	(Italy) Imperiale Racing	Ret						0
	(Switzerland) Lucas Mauron	(Italy) Raton Racing			43	40	Ret		0
	(Italy) Stefano Costantini (Switzerland) Christoph Lenz (France) Michael Petit	(Italy) Raton Racing			43	40	Ret		0
	(Germany) Jens Liebhauser	(Poland) JP Motorsport			42	50	Ret		0
	(France) Jean-Luc Beaubelique	(France) AKKA ASP	Ret		53	42	Ret		0
	(Germany) Michael Joos (Germany) Marco Seefried	(Germany) Precote Herberth Motorsport			44	45	Ret		0
	(France) Christoph Cresp (Belgium) Gregory Paisse (France) Steven Palette	(France) Saintéloc Racing			47	51	Ret		0
	(United Kingdom) Callum MacLeod	(United Kingdom) Ram Racing			48	52	Ret		0
	(Netherlands) Nicky Catsburg (Austria) Philipp Eng (Brazil) Augusto Farfus	(Germany) Walkenhorst Motorsport			50	53	Ret		0
	(Switzerland) Edoardo Mortara (Germany) Frank Stippler	(Belgium) Belgian Audi Club Team WRT			54	54	Ret		0
	(Italy) Raffaele Gianmaria (Italy) Luigi Moccia	(China) Orange1 FFF Racing Team			55	55	Ret		0
	(France) Simon Gachet	(Germany) Attempto Racing			56	56	Ret		0
	(Italy) Kikko Galbiati (Italy) Giovanni Venturini	(Italy) Imperiale Racing	Ret						0
	(Italy) Lorenzo Bontempelli (Italy) Maurizio Mediani	(Germany) Rinaldi Racing						Ret	0
	(Germany) Manuel Lauck	(Germany) Rinaldi Racing						Ret	0
Drivers ineligible to score points
–	(Germany) Timo Bernhard (Netherlands) Jeroen Bleekemolen (Switzerland) Simona de Silvestro	(Germany) Rowe Racing		8					–
Pos.	Drivers	Team	IMO (Italy)	NÜR (Germany)	6hrs	12hrs	24hrs	LEC (France)	Points
Pos.	Drivers	Team	IMO (Italy)	NÜR (Germany)	SPA (Belgium)			LEC (France)	Points

Key
Colour	Result
Gold	Race winner
Silver	2nd place
Bronze	3rd place
Green	Points finish
Blue	Non-points finish
Blue	Non-classified finish (NC)
Purple	Did not finish (Ret)
Black	Disqualified (DSQ)
Black	Excluded (EX)
White	Did not start (DNS)
White	Race cancelled (C)
White	Withdrew (WD)
Blank	Did not participate

^{P} – Pole
^{F} – Fastest Lap

==== Silver Cup ====
Pos.	Drivers	Team	IMO (Italy)	NÜR (Germany)	SPA (Belgium)			LEC (France)	Points
Pos.	Drivers	Team	IMO (Italy)	NÜR (Germany)	6hrs	12hrs	24hrs	LEC (France)	Points
1	(Finland) Patrick Kujala (United Kingdom) Alex MacDowall (Denmark) Frederik Schandorff	(United Kingdom) Barwell Motorsport	12	13^{P}	18	23	36	14	108
2	(Russia) Sergey Afanasyev (Germany) Hubert Haupt	(Germany) Haupt Racing Team	Ret	26	20	20	18	17	77
3	(Italy) Michele Beretta	(Germany) Haupt Racing Team			20	20	18	17	65
4	(France) Valentin Hasse-Clot (United Kingdom) Andrew Watson	(United Kingdom) Garage 59	14	12	25	44	Ret	Ret	58
5	(Germany) Patrick Assenheimer (Argentina) Ezequiel Pérez Companc	(Spain) Madpanda Motorsport	22	17	41	34	26	25^{P}	50
6	(Belgium) Baptiste Moulin	(China) Orange1 FFF Racing Team	21	28	31	32	24	26	47
7	(Italy) Gabriele Piana	(Germany) Haupt Racing Team			20	20	18		46
8	(France) Timothé Buret (France) Thomas Neubauer (France) Aurélien Panis	(France) Tech 1 Racing	19^{P}	39	28	43	Ret	16	44
9	(United Kingdom) James Pull	(United Kingdom) Garage 59		12	25	44	Ret	Ret	40
10	(France) Florian Latorre	(China) Orange1 FFF Racing Team	21		31	32	24	26	38
11	(Chile) Benjamín Hites (Switzerland) Lucas Légeret (Switzerland) Alex Fontana	(France) AKKA ASP	38	38^{F}	27	39	29^{P}	21	32
12	(Netherlands) Rik Breukers (Denmark) Benjamin Goethe (United Kingdom) Stuart Hall	(United Kingdom) ROFGO Racing with WRT	32	Ret	34	35	34	19^{F}	31
13	(Belgium) Adrien De Leener (Denmark) Mikkel O. Pedersen (Italy) Andrea Rizzoli	(Italy) Dinamic Motorsport	16	31	38	48	Ret	23	30
14	(United Kingdom) Taylor Proto	(China) Orange1 FFF Racing Team			31	32	24	26	28
15	(Netherlands) Indy Dontje (United Kingdom) Philip Ellis (United States) Russel Ward	(Germany) HTP Motorsport			36	27	21^{F}		27
16	(France) Hugo Chevalier	(China) Orange1 FFF Racing Team			31	32	24		24
17	(United Kingdom) Frank Bird (Denmark) Nicolai Kjærgaard (United Kingdom) Euan McKay	(United Kingdom) Team Parker Racing	37	37	37	30	28	Ret	23
18	(Germany) Alex Aka (Austria) Nicolas Schöll	(Germany) Attempto Racing	28^{F}	24	56	56	Ret	Ret	21
19	(France) Romain Monti	(Spain) Madpanda Motorsport		17					19
20	(Finland) Juuso Puhakka (Mexico) Ricardo Sanchez	(Spain) Madpanda Motorsport			41	34	26		16
21	(United Kingdom) Finlay Hutchison	(Germany) Haupt Racing Team	Ret						15
21	(United Kingdom) Finlay Hutchison	(Germany) Attempto Racing		24	56	56	Ret	Ret	15
22	(Switzerland) Joël Camathias	(Germany) Haupt Racing Team		26					12
23	(Italy) Andrea Amici	(China) Orange1 FFF Racing Team	21						10
24	(Venezuela) Jonathan Cecotto (United Kingdom) Ricky Collard	(China) Orange1 FFF Racing Team		28					9
25	(Spain) Jorge Cazebas	(Spain) Madpanda Motorsport	22						8
26	(Canada) Roman De Angelis	(United Kingdom) Garage 59			25	44	Ret		7
27	(Italy) Tommaso Mosca	(Germany) Attempto Racing	28^{F}						6
	(Monaco) Cédric Sbirrazzuoli	(Italy) Dinamic Motorsport			38	48	Ret		0
	(France) Simon Gachet	(Germany) Attempto Racing			56	56	Ret		0
Pos.	Drivers	Team	IMO (Italy)	NÜR (Germany)	6hrs	12hrs	24hrs	LEC (France)	Points
Pos.	Drivers	Team	IMO (Italy)	NÜR (Germany)	SPA (Belgium)			LEC (France)	Points

==== Pro-Am Cup ====
Pos.	Drivers	Team	IMO (Italy)	NÜR (Germany)	SPA (Belgium)			LEC (France)	Points
Pos.	Drivers	Team	IMO (Italy)	NÜR (Germany)	6hrs	12hrs	24hrs	LEC (France)	Points
1	(United Kingdom) Chris Goodwin (Sweden) Alexander West	(United Kingdom) Garage 59	13	33	17	24	20	20	92
2	(Italy) Eddie Cheever (United Kingdom) Chris Froggatt (Hong Kong) Jonathan Hui	(United Kingdom) Sky - Tempesta Racing	23^{P}	32	21	19	17	24^{P}	79
3	(United Kingdom) Rob Collard (Russia) Leo Machitski (United Kingdom) Sandy Mitchell	(United Kingdom) Barwell Motorsport	34	25	26	22	15^{F}	22	76
4	(United Kingdom) Jonathan Adam	(United Kingdom) Garage 59	13	33	17	24	20		59
5	(Japan) Hiroshi Hamaguchi (United Kingdom) Phil Keen	(China) Orange1 FFF Racing Team	33^{F}	18	55	55	Ret	27^{F}	52
6	(Germany) Elia Erhart	(China) Orange1 FFF Racing Team		18				27^{F}	48
7	(United Kingdom) Ricky Collard	(United Kingdom) Barwell Motorsport			26	22	15^{F}		41
8	(Italy) Giancarlo Fisichella	(United Kingdom) Sky - Tempesta Racing			21	19	17		39
9	(Switzerland) Daniel Allemann (Germany) Ralf Bohn (Germany) Robert Renauer	(Germany) Precote Herberth Motorsport		20	35	28	37^{P}		38
10	(Belgium) Louis Machiels	(Italy) AF Corse	26	23	32	29	35	Ret	38
10	(Italy) Andrea Bertolini (Netherlands) Niek Hommerson	(Italy) AF Corse	26	23	32	29	35		38
11	(Germany) Pierre Ehret (Germany) Daniel Keilwitz (Italy) Rino Mastronardi	(Germany) Rinaldi Racing	25	27	40	33	22	Ret	36
12	(Belgium) Maxime Martin	(United Kingdom) Garage 59			17	24	20		34
13	(Germany) Marvin Kirchhöfer	(United Kingdom) Garage 59						20	33
14	(Saudi Arabia) Karim Ojjeh (France) Gilles Vannelet	(Belgium) Boutsen Ginion Racing	27	Ret	33	25	25	Ret	29
15	(United Kingdom) Tom Onslow-Cole (Netherlands) Remon Vos	(United Kingdom) Ram Racing	Ret	22	48	52	Ret	28	27
15	(Austria) Martin Konrad	(United Kingdom) Ram Racing		22	48	52	Ret	28	27
16	(France) Fabien Barthez (France) Jim Pla	(France) AKKA ASP	Ret	21^{PF}	53	42	Ret		21
16	(France) Thomas Drouet	(France) AKKA ASP		21^{PF}	53	42	Ret		21
17	(Germany) Jens Klingmann	(Belgium) Boutsen Ginion Racing		Ret	33	25	25	Ret	21
17	(Belgium) Benjamin Lessennes	(Belgium) Boutsen Ginion Racing			33	25	25		21
18	(South Africa) David Perel	(Germany) Rinaldi Racing			40	33	22	Ret	18
19	(Brazil) Daniel Serra	(Italy) AF Corse			32	29	35		16
20	(France) Michael Blanchemain (France) Arthur Rougier (Luxembourg) Clément Seyler	(France) Saintéloc Racing	24						15
21	(Germany) Alfred Renauer	(Germany) Precote Herberth Motorsport		34	35	28	37^{P}		14
22	(Austria) Dominik Baumann (United States) Colin Braun (United States) George Kurtz (Germany) Valentin Pierburg	(Germany) SPS Automotive Performance			45	36	27		11
23	(United Kingdom) Nick Yelloly	(Belgium) Boutsen Ginion Racing	27						8
24	(Switzerland) Mauro Calamia (Switzerland) Ivan Jacoma (Italy) Roberto Pampanini	(Italy) Dinamic Motorsport	29						6
25	(France) Romano Ricci (France) Stéphane Tribaudini (Romania) Petru Umbrărescu	(France) CMR		29					4
26	(Austria) Christian Klien (Poland) Patryk Krupińsky (Austria) Mathias Lauda (Germany) Jens Liebhauser	(Poland) JP Motorsport			42	50	Ret		2
27	(Germany) Christian Hook	(Germany) SPS Automotive Performance	Ret	30					2
27	(Germany) Christian Hook	(Germany) Rinaldi Racing						Ret	2
27	(Germany) Nico Bastian (Germany) Florian Scholze	(Germany) SPS Automotive Performance	Ret	30					2
28	(France) Jean-Luc Beaubelique	(France) AKKA ASP	Ret		53	42	Ret		1
	(Germany) Jürgen Häring (Greece) Dimitrios Konstantinou	(Germany) Precote Herberth Motorsport		34					0
	(United Kingdom) Callum MacLeod	(United Kingdom) Ram Racing			48	52	Ret		0
	(Italy) Raffaele Gianmaria (Italy) Luigi Moccia	(China) Orange1 FFF Racing Team			55	55	Ret		0
	(Italy) Lorenzo Bontempelli (Italy) Maurizio Mediani	(Italy) AF Corse						Ret	0
	(Germany) Manuel Lauck	(Germany) Rinaldi Racing						Ret	0
Pos.	Drivers	Team	IMO (Italy)	NÜR (Germany)	6hrs	12hrs	24hrs	LEC (France)	Points
Pos.	Drivers	Team	IMO (Italy)	NÜR (Germany)	SPA (Belgium)			LEC (France)	Points

==== Am Cup ====
Pos.	Drivers	Team	IMO (Italy)	NÜR (Germany)	SPA (Belgium)			LEC (France)	Points
Pos.	Drivers	Team	IMO (Italy)	NÜR (Germany)	6hrs	12hrs	24hrs	LEC (France)	Points
1	(France) Stephane Tribaudini	(France) CMR	31^{PF}		46	38	30	29	103
2	(France) Romano Ricci	(France) CMR	31^{PF}		46	38	30		70
3	(France) Michael Blanchemain	(France) Saintéloc Racing		36^{PF}				30^{PF}	59
4	(Belgium) Pierre-Yves Paque	(France) Saintéloc Racing		36^{PF}	47	51	Ret^{F}		46
5	(Belgium) Stéphane Lémeret (France) Clement Mateu	(France) CMR			46	38	30		44
6	(Luxembourg) Clément Seyler	(France) Saintéloc Racing		36^{PF}					34
7	(France) Philippe Chatelet (France) Nicolas Misslin	(France) CMR						29	33
8	(Belgium) Bernhard Delhez	(France) CMR	31^{PF}						26
9	(France) Christophe Hamon (France) Fabien Michal	(France) Saintéloc Racing						30^{PF}	25
10	(Italy) Stefano Costantini (Switzerland) Christoph Lenz (Switzerland) Lucas Mauron (France) Michael Petit	(Italy) Raton Racing			43	40	Ret^{P}		22
11	(Germany) Jürgen Häring (Germany) Michael Joos (Greece) Dimitrios Konstantinou (Germany) Marco Seefried	(Germany) Precote Herberth Motorsport			44	45	Ret		16
13	(France) Christoph Cresp (Belgium) Gregory Paisse (France) Steven Palette	(France) Saintéloc Racing			47	51	Ret^{F}		12
Pos.	Drivers	Team	IMO (Italy)	NÜR (Germany)	6hrs	12hrs	24hrs	LEC (France)	Points
Pos.	Drivers	Team	IMO (Italy)	NÜR (Germany)	SPA (Belgium)			LEC (France)	Points

=== Team's championships ===
==== Overall ====
Pos.	Team	Manufacturer	IMO (Italy)	NÜR (Germany)	SPA (Belgium)			LEC (France)	Points
Pos.	Team	Manufacturer	IMO (Italy)	NÜR (Germany)	6hrs	12hrs	24hrs	LEC (France)	Points
1	(Italy) AF Corse 51 (Russia) SMP Racing	Ferrari	7 (Note: A drive-through penalty was wrongfully handed out to Calado, Nielsen and Pier Guidi at Imola. A request by the AF Corse team to be awarded with points for second place was accepted by the sporting board.)	14	4	1	5	1^{P}	80
2	(United Arab Emirates) GPX Racing	Porsche	2	19^{PF}	3	6	4	2	66
3	(Italy) Dinamic Motorsport	Porsche	10	1	13	7	3	10	59
4	(Belgium) Audi Sport Team WRT (Belgium) Belgian Audi Club Team WRT (United Kingdom) ROFGO Racing with WRT	Audi	1	4	24	21	14	4^{F}	56
5	(France) AKKA ASP (France) Mercedes-AMG Team AKKA ASP	Mercedes-AMG	3	2	1	37	29^{P}	18	52
6	(Germany) Rowe Racing	Porsche	6	8	9	3	1		45
7	(Germany) Haupt Racing Team (Germany) Mercedes-AMG Team HRT	Mercedes-AMG	15	3	12	4	7	6	43
8	(China) Orange1 FFF Racing Team	Lamborghini	21	16	2	2	24^{F}	3	37
9	(Germany) Attempto Racing (Germany) Audi Sport Team Attempto Racing	Audi	28^{PF}	24	5	10	2	9	31
10	(France) Saintéloc Racing (France) Audi Sport Team Saintéloc Racing	Audi	5	10	15	8	6	12	28
11	(United States) Bentley K-PAX Racing	Bentley	17	6	10	5	10	13	23
12	(Switzerland) Emil Frey Racing	Lamborghini	11	Ret	6	11	16	8	15
13	(Hong Kong) KCMG	Porsche		9	8	26	13		11
14	(United Kingdom) Optimum Motorsport	McLaren	8	11	51	46	Ret		10
15	(Germany) GetSpeed Performance	Mercedes-AMG	39	7				15	9
16	(United Kingdom) Barwell Motorsport	Lamborghini	12	13	18	22	15	14	1
	(United Kingdom) Garage 59	Aston Martin	13	12	17	24	20	20	0
	(France) CMR	Bentley	31	15	46	38	30	29	0
	(France) Tech 1 Racing	Lexus	19	39	28	43	Ret	16	0
	(United Kingdom) Sky - Tempesta Racing	Ferrari	23	32	21	19	17	24	0
	(Spain) Madpanda Motorsport	Mercedes-AMG	22	17	41	34	26	25	0
	(Germany) Precote Herberth Motorsport	Porsche		20	35	28	37		0
	(Germany) Rinaldi Racing	Ferrari	25	27	40	33	22	Ret	0
	(United Kingdom) Ram Racing	Mercedes-AMG	Ret	22	48	52	Ret	28	0
	(Italy) AF Corse 52	Ferrari	26	23	32	29	35	Ret	0
	(Belgium) Boutsen Ginion Racing	BMW	27	Ret	33	25	25	Ret	0
	(Germany) SPS Automotive Performance	Mercedes-AMG	Ret	30	45	36	27		0
	(United Kingdom) Team Parker Racing	Bentley	37	37	37	30	28	Ret	0
	(Poland) JP Motorsport	Mercedes-AMG		35	42	50	Ret		0
	(Australia) Ema Group/Team 59Racing	McLaren	35						0
	(Italy) Imperiale Racing	Lamborghini	Ret						0
Teams ineligible to score points
–	(Italy) Team Honda Racing	Honda			7	12	9		–
–	(Germany) Frikadelli Racing Team	Porsche			11	9	8		–
–	(Taiwan) HubAuto Corsa	Ferrari			22	17	23		–
–	(Germany) Walkenhorst Motorsport	BMW			23	18	Ret		–
–	(Germany) HTP Motorsport	Mercedes-AMG			36	27	21		–
–	(Italy) Raton Racing	Lamborghini			43	40	Ret		–
Pos.	Team	Manufacturer	IMO (Italy)	NÜR (Germany)	6hrs	12hrs	24hrs	LEC (France)	Points
Pos.	Team	Manufacturer	IMO (Italy)	NÜR (Germany)	SPA (Belgium)			LEC (France)	Points

==== Silver Cup ====
Pos.	Team	Manufacturer	IMO (Italy)	NÜR (Germany)	SPA (Belgium)			LEC (France)	Points
Pos.	Team	Manufacturer	IMO (Italy)	NÜR (Germany)	6hrs	12hrs	24hrs	LEC (France)	Points
1	(United Kingdom) Barwell Motorsport	Lamborghini	12	13^{P}	18	23	36	14	110
2	(Germany) Haupt Racing Team	Mercedes-AMG	Ret	26	20	20	18	17	77
3	(United Kingdom) Garage 59	Aston Martin	14	12	25	44	Ret	Ret	59
4	(Spain) Madpanda Motorsport	Mercedes-AMG	22	17	41	34	26	25^{P}	54
5	(China) Orange1 FFF Racing Team	Lamborghini	21	28	31	32	24	26	51
6	(France) Tech 1 Racing	Lexus	19^{P}	39	28	43	Ret	16	45
7	(France) AKKA ASP	Mercedes-AMG	38	38^{F}	27	39	29^{P}	21	35
8	(United Kingdom) ROFGO Racing with WRT	Audi	32	Ret	34	35	34	19^{F}	34
9	(Italy) Dinamic Motorsport	Porsche	16	31	38	48	Ret	23	31
10	(United Kingdom) Team Parker Racing	Bentley	37	37	37	30	28	Ret	27
11	(Germany) Attempto Racing	Audi	28^{F}	24	56	56	Ret	Ret	21
Teams ineligible to score points
–	(Germany) HTP Motorsport	Mercedes-AMG			36	27	21^{F}		–
Pos.	Team	Manufacturer	IMO (Italy)	NÜR (Germany)	6hrs	12hrs	24hrs	LEC (France)	Points
Pos.	Team	Manufacturer	IMO (Italy)	NÜR (Germany)	SPA (Belgium)			LEC (France)	Points

==== Pro-Am Cup ====
Pos.	Team	Manufacturer	IMO (Italy)	NÜR (Germany)	SPA (Belgium)			LEC (France)	Points
Pos.	Team	Manufacturer	IMO (Italy)	NÜR (Germany)	6hrs	12hrs	24hrs	LEC (France)	Points
1	(United Kingdom) Garage 59	Aston Martin	13	33	17	24	20	20	92
2	(United Kingdom) Sky - Tempesta Racing	Ferrari	23^{P}	32	21	19	17	24^{P}	79
3	(United Kingdom) Barwell Motorsport	Lamborghini	34	25	26	22	15^{F}	22	76
4	(China) Orange1 FFF Racing Team	Lamborghini	33^{F}	18	55	55	Ret	27^{F}	52
5	(Germany) Precote Herberth Motorsport	Porsche		20	35	28	37^{P}		38
6	(Italy) AF Corse	Ferrari	26	23	32	29	35	Ret	38
7	(Germany) Rinaldi Racing	Ferrari	25	27	40	33	22	Ret	36
8	(Belgium) Boutsen Ginion Racing	BMW	27	Ret	33	25	25	Ret	29
9	(United Kingdom) Ram Racing	Mercedes-AMG	Ret	22	48	52	Ret	28	27
10	(France) AKKA ASP	Mercedes-AMG	Ret	21^{PF}	53	42	Ret		21
11	(France) Saintéloc Racing	Audi	24						15
12	(Germany) SPS Automotive Performance	Mercedes-AMG	Ret	30	45	36	27		13
13	(Italy) Dinamic Motorsport	Porsche	29						6
14	(France) CMR	Bentley		29					4
15	(Poland) JP Motorsport	Mercedes-AMG			42	50	Ret		2
Pos.	Team	Manufacturer	IMO (Italy)	NÜR (Germany)	6hrs	12hrs	24hrs	LEC (France)	Points
Pos.	Team	Manufacturer	IMO (Italy)	NÜR (Germany)	SPA (Belgium)			LEC (France)	Points

==== Am Cup ====
Pos.	Team	Manufacturer	IMO (Italy)	NÜR (Germany)	SPA (Belgium)			LEC (France)	Points
Pos.	Team	Manufacturer	IMO (Italy)	NÜR (Germany)	6hrs	12hrs	24hrs	LEC (France)	Points
1	(France) CMR	Bentley	31^{PF}		46	38	30 (Note: Raton Racing took the Am Cup pole position for the Spa 24 Hours, however, as they were ineligible to score points, the point for pole position was awarded to CMR.)	29	106
2	(France) Saintéloc Racing	Audi		36^{PF}	47	51	Ret^{F}	30^{PF}	73
3	(Germany) Precote Herberth Motorsport	Porsche			44	45	Ret		21
Teams ineligible to score points
–	(Italy) Raton Racing	Lamborghini			43	40	Ret^{P}		–
Pos.	Team	Manufacturer	IMO (Italy)	NÜR (Germany)	6hrs	12hrs	24hrs	LEC (France)	Points
Pos.	Team	Manufacturer	IMO (Italy)	NÜR (Germany)	SPA (Belgium)			LEC (France)	Points

== See also ==
- 2020 GT World Challenge Europe
- 2020 GT World Challenge Europe Sprint Cup
- 2020 GT World Challenge Asia
- 2020 GT World Challenge America
- 2020 Intercontinental GT Challenge
