= Ricky Collard =

British racing driver (born 1996)

- Collard driving an EXCELR8 Motorsport Hyundai i30 at Thruxton Circuit in 2026
- Nationality: (United Kingdom) British
- Born: 30 July 1996 (age 30) Frimley, United Kingdom
- Relatives: Rob Collard (father)

British Touring Car Championship career
- Debut season: 2018
- Current team: Team VERTU
- Categorisation: FIA Silver (until 2024); FIA Gold (2025–)
- Former teams: West Surrey Racing; Toyota Gazoo Racing UK
- Starts: 98 (99 entries)
- Wins: 0
- Podiums: 10
- Poles: 0
- Fastest laps: 1
- Best finish: 7th in 2026

Previous series
- 2018-2021 2020, 2017 2018 2017 2017 2016 2015 2014 2013: GT World Challenge Europe Endurance Cup; Intercontinental GT Challenge; British GT; 24H Series; ADAC GT Masters; BRDC British F3; MSA Formula; British Formula Ford; Ginetta Junior Championship

Championship titles
- 2024: British GT Championship

Ricky Collard (born 30 July 1996) is a British racing driver who most recently competed in the British Touring Car Championship for Team VERTU. He is the son of former BTCC driver Rob Collard and the grandson of Hot Rod racer Mick Collard.

== Early career ==
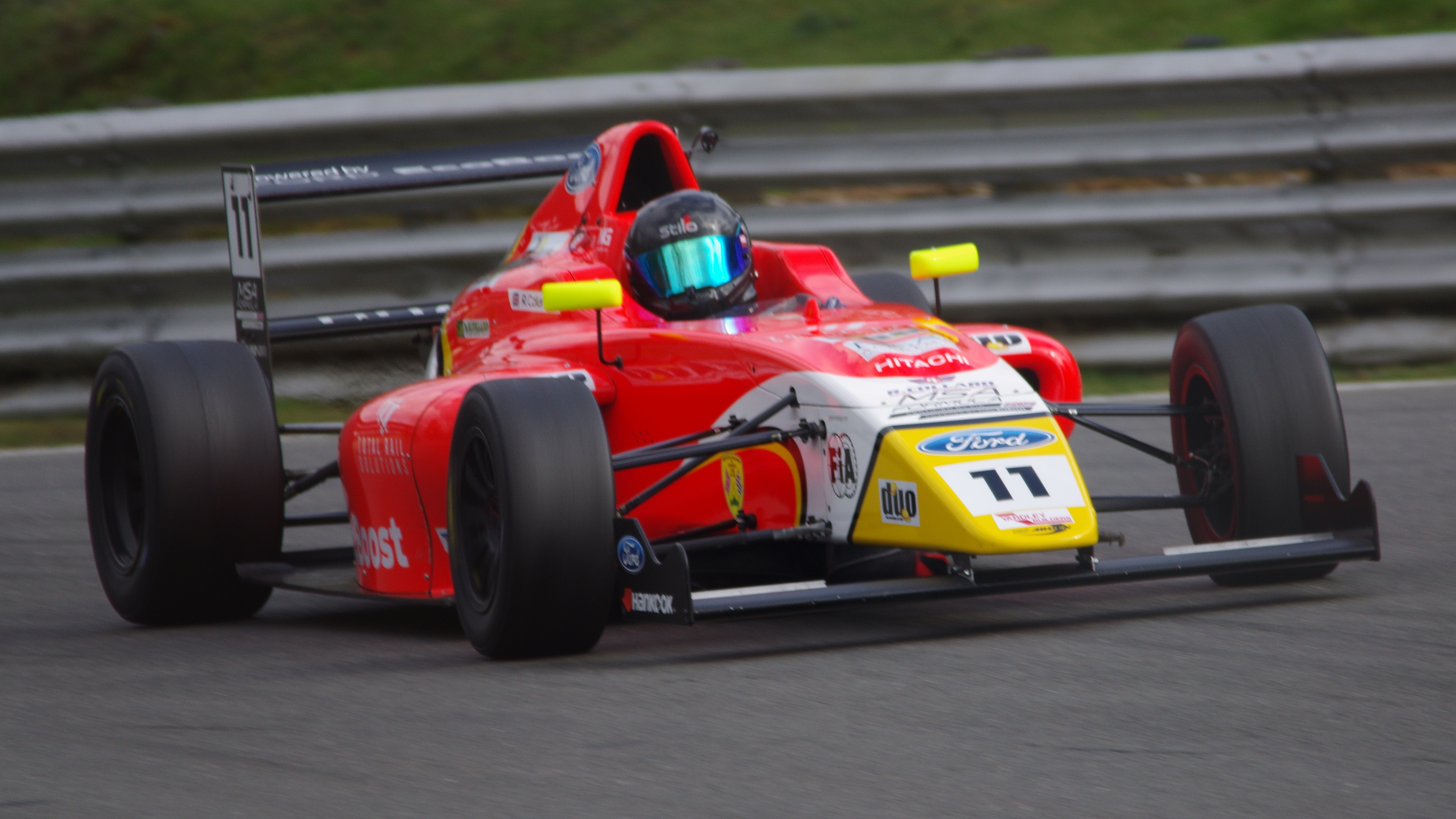
Collard racing at Brands Hatch in 2015

Collard started his racing career in karts in 2006, finishing fourth in the British Cadet Championship in 2009, sixth in the Kartmasters British Grand Prix KF3 category in 2011, and eighth in the U18 Karting World Championship in 2012. That season, he also made his car racing debut in the Ginetta Junior Championship.

Following a season in the British Formula Ford Championship, where he finished seventh overall with five podiums, Collard stepped into the MSA Formula Championship in 2015. He took six wins and finished the year as runner-up to Lando Norris, subsequently progressing to the BRDC British F3 Championship in 2016 with Carlin Motorsport. There, Collard managed to win five races on his way to finishing second in the standings.

== Sportscar & touring car career ==
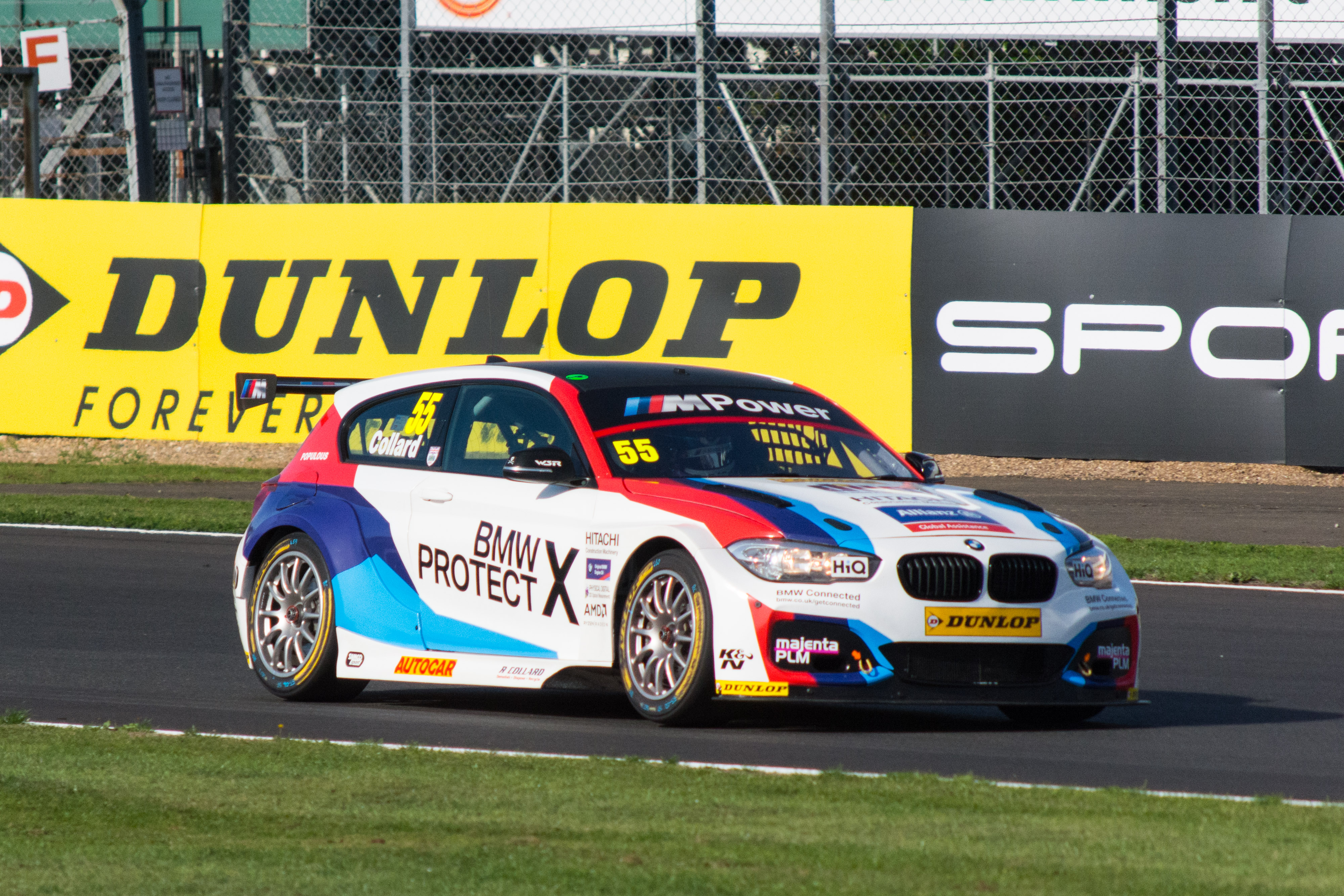
Collard driving for Team BMW at Silverstone during the 2018 BTCC season

For the 2017 season, Collard switched to sportscar racing, competing in the opening three events of the ADAC GT Masters as a BMW junior driver. He and factory driver Philipp Eng won during the first round at Oschersleben and scored a further podium at the Red Bull Ring, before Collard withdrew from the subsequent round in lieu of a BMW-organised viewing experience in the DTM.

Collard entered the Blancpain GT Series Endurance Cup in 2018, driving for Rowe Racing. The campaign proved to be disappointing, as he and the team were forced to retire from all four events he entered. That same year, Collard made his British Touring Car Championship debut at Rockingham, substituting his father Rob who was ruled out on medical advice following concussion suffered at the previous round. He drove the BMW 125i M Sport for the remaining four rounds of the season, scoring his maiden podium at Silverstone with a third place finish.

Collard racing at Snetterton Circuit in 2023

In 2019, Collard entered the sprint-formatted GT World Challenge Europe together with Marvin Kirchhöfer, driving an Aston Martin Vantage AMR GT3 for R-Motorsport. With points scored in the majority of races, Collard and Kirchhöfer ended up eighth in the standings, highlighted by a win at the Nürburgring. Despite this success, 2020 proved to be a patchy season for Collard, who raced in individual events of the GT World Challenge Europe Endurance Cup. The peak of his year came at the 24 Hours of Spa, where he helped Barwell Motorsport, in a lineup which included Sandy Mitchell, Leo Machitski, and Collard's father Rob, towards victory in the Pro-Am class. Collard continued without a full-time schedule in 2021, racing in two Endurance Cup events.

In 2022, Collard returned to the BTCC, driving for Toyota Gazoo Racing UK. After struggling early on, Collard's form improved in the second half of the year, as he scored a best result of fourth on his way to 16th in the championship. Following the season, Collard announced that he would be retiring from racing. The Briton reversed his decision however, instead re-signing with the team for the 2023 season. At Brands Hatch, Collard crossed the finish line first during race 3, but was penalised for a track-limit infringement on the final lap, demoting him to eighth. He eventually scored his sole podium of the year at Knockhill, which helped him towards eighth place in the standings.

For the 2024 campaign, Collard partnered with his father Rob to race in the GT3 class of the British GT Championship.

After participating in various GT World Challenge series in 2025, Collard returned to the BTCC, this time with EXCELR8 Motorsport's Team VERTU. He parted ways prior to Silverstone, but rejoined the team for the season finale.

== Racing record ==
=== Career summary ===
Season	Series	Team	Races	Wins	Poles	F/Laps	Podiums	Points	Position
2012	Ginetta Junior Championship	Tollbar Racing with WIRED	2	0	0	0	0	10	17th
2014	British Formula Ford Championship	Falcon Motorsport	29	0	0	0	5	436	7th
2015	MSA Formula Championship	TRS Arden Junior Racing Team	30	6	0	2	13	371	**2nd**
2016	BRDC British Formula 3 Championship	Carlin	23	5	4	5	9	466	**2nd**
2017	ADAC GT Masters	BMW Team Schnitzer	6	1	1	1	2	61	14th
2017	24H Series - SPX	Schubert Motorsport	1	0	0	0	0	18	NC†
2017	Intercontinental GT Challenge	Walkenhorst	0	0	0	0	0	0	NC
2018	British Touring Car Championship	Team BMW	11	0	0	0	1	46	25th
2018	Blancpain GT Series Endurance Cup	Rowe Racing	4	0	0	0	0	9	36th
2018	British GT Championship - GT4	Century Motorsport	2	0	0	0	2	30	15th
2019	Blancpain GT World Challenge Europe	R-Motorsport	10	1	0	1	1	39.5	8th
2019	Blancpain GT Series Endurance Cup	R-Motorsport	1	0	0	0	0	0	NC
2019	Blancpain GT Series Endurance Cup - Silver Cup	R-Motorsport	1	0	0	0	0	0	NC
2020	GT World Challenge Europe Endurance Cup - Silver Cup	Orange1 FFF Racing Team	1	0	0	0	0	9	24th
2020	GT World Challenge Europe Endurance Cup	Orange1 FFF Racing Team	1	0	0	0	0	0	NC
2020	GT World Challenge Europe Endurance Cup	Barwell Motorsport	1	0	0	0	0	0	NC
2020	GT World Challenge Europe Endurance Cup - Pro-Am	Barwell Motorsport	1	1	0	1	1	41	7th
2020	Intercontinental GT Challenge	Barwell Motorsport	1	0	0	0	0	0	NC
2021	GT World Challenge Europe Endurance Cup - Pro-Am	Ram Racing	1	0	0	0	0	3	36th
2021	Intercontinental GT Challenge	Ram Racing	1	0	0	0	0	0	NC
2022	British Touring Car Championship	Toyota Gazoo Racing UK	30	0	0	0	0	81	16th
2023	British Touring Car Championship	Toyota Gazoo Racing UK	30	0	0	0	1	217	8th
2024	British GT Championship - GT3	Barwell Motorsport	9	2	3	0	5	182	**1st**
2024	GT World Challenge Europe Endurance Cup	Barwell Motorsport	2	0	0	0	0	0	NC
2025	GT World Challenge Europe Sprint Cup	Barwell Motorsport	4	0	0	0	0	0	NC
2025	GT World Challenge Europe Sprint Cup - Gold Cup	Barwell Motorsport	4	0	0	0	0	15	8th
2025	GT World Challenge Europe Endurance Cup	Barwell Motorsport	1	0	0	0	0	0	NC
2026	British Touring Car Championship	Team VERTU	27	0	0	1	8	273	7th

^{†} As Collard had not competed in the required number of rounds, he was ineligible for a championship position.

=== Complete Ginetta Junior Championship results ===
(key) (Races in bold indicate pole position) (Races in italics indicate fastest lap)

Year	Team	1	2	3	4	5	6	7	8	9	10	11	12	13	14	15	16	17	18	19	20	DC	Points
2012	Tollbar Racing with WIRED	BHI; 1	BHI; 2	DON; 1	DON; 2	THR; 1	THR; 2	OUL; 1; 11	OUL; 2 Ret	CRO; 1	CRO; 2	SNE; 1	SNE; 2	KNO; 1	KNO; 2	ROC; 1	ROC; 2	SIL; 1	SIL; 2	BHGP; 1	BHGP; 2	17th	10

=== Complete British Formula Ford Championship/MSA Formula Championship results ===
(key) (Races in bold indicate pole position – 1 point awarded in first race; races in italics indicate fastest lap – 1 point awarded all races; * signifies that driver lead race for at least one lap – 1 point awarded all races)

Year	Team	1	2	3	4	5	6	7	8	9	10	11	12	13	14	15	16	17	18	19	20	21	22	23	24	25	26	27	28	29	30	Pos	Points
2014	Falcon Motorsport	BHI; 1; 4	BHI; 2; 3	BHI; 3 Ret	DON; 1 Ret	DON; 2; 9	DON; 3 Ret	THR; 1; 9	THR; 2; 8	THR; 3; 8	OUL; 1; 7	OUL; 2; 8	OUL; 3; 7	CRO; 1 Ret	CRO; 2; 9	CRO; 3; 8	SNE; 1; 4	SNE; 2; 2	SNE; 3; 9	KNO; 1; 3	KNO; 2; 4	KNO; 3; 6	ROC; 1; 5	**ROC**; **2**; 4	ROC; 3 Ret	SIL; 1; 6	**SIL**; **2**; 4	SIL; 3 DNS	BHGP; 1; 2	BHGP; 2; 5	BHGP; 3; 3	7th	436
2015	TRS Arden Junior Racing Team	BHI; 1; 5	BHI; 2; 1	BHI; 3; 6	DON; 1; 6	DON; 2; 2	DON; 3; 2	THR; 1; 4	THR; 2; 4	THR; 3; 2	OUL; 1; 1	OUL; 2; 9	OUL; 3; 2	CRO; 1; 2	CRO; 2; 11	CRO; 3; 1	SNE; 1; 3	SNE; 2; 6	SNE; 3; 9	KNO; 1 Ret	KNO; 2; 7	KNO; 3; 1	ROC; 1; 8	ROC; 2; 1	ROC; 3; 8	SIL; 1; 5	SIL; 2; 1	SIL; 2 Ret	BHGP; 1; 3	BHGP; 2; 6	BHGP; 3; 8	2nd	371

=== Complete BRDC British Formula 3 Championship results ===
(key) (Races in bold indicate pole position – 1 point awarded in first race; races in italics indicate fastest lap – 1 point awarded all races; * signifies that driver lead race for at least one lap – 1 point awarded all races)

Year	Team	1	2	3	4	5	6	7	8	9	10	11	12	13	14	15	16	17	18	19	20	21	22	23	24	Pos	Points
2016	Carlin	SNE1; 1; 5	SNE1; 2 Ret	SNE1; 3; 8	BRH; 1; 2	BRH; 2; 4	BRH; 3; 2	ROC; 1; 2	ROC; 2; 7	ROC; 3; 1	**OUL**; **1**; 1	OUL; 2; 8	OUL; 3; 1	SIL; 1; 4	SIL; 2; 13	SIL; 3 C	SPA; 1; 3	SPA; 2; 6	SPA; 3; 6	**SNE2**; **1**; 1	SNE2; 2; 7	SNE2; 3; 1	DON; 1 Ret	DON; 2; 10	DON; 3; 6	2nd	466

=== Complete ADAC GT Masters results ===
(key) (Races in bold indicate pole position) (Races in italics indicate fastest lap)

Year	Team	Car	1	2	3	4	5	6	7	8	9	10	11	12	13	14	DC	Points
2017	BMW Team Schnitzer	BMW M6 GT3	OSC; 1; 10	**OSC**; **2**; 1	LAU; 1; 17	LAU; 2; 5	RBR; 1; 3	RBR; 2; 5	ZAN; 1	ZAN; 2	NÜR; 1	NÜR; 2	SAC; 1	SAC; 2	HOC; 1	HOC; 2	14th	61

=== Complete British GT Championship results ===
(key) (Races in bold indicate pole position) (Races in italics indicate fastest lap)

Year	Team	Car	Class	1	2	3	4	5	6	7	8	9	DC	Points
2018	Century Motorsport	BMW M4 GT4	GT4	OUL; 1; 16	OUL; 2; 15	ROC; 1	SNE; 1	SNE; 2	SIL; 1	SPA; 1	BRH; 1	DON; 1	15th	30
2024	Black Bull-Barwell Motorsport	Lamborghini Huracán GT3 Evo 2	GT3	**OUL**; **1**; 1	OUL; 2; 5	SIL; 1; 5	DON; 1; 5	SPA; 1; 3	**SNE**; **1**; 2	SNE; 2; 2	**DON**; **1**; 1	BRH; 1; 5	1st	182

=== Complete British Touring Car Championship results ===
(key) (Races in bold indicate pole position – 1 point awarded in first race; races in italics indicate fastest lap – 1 point awarded all races; * signifies that driver lead race for at least one lap – 1 point awarded all races; ^{Superscript} number indicates points-scoring qualifying race position)

Year	Team	Car	1	2	3	4	5	6	7	8	9	10	11	12	13	14	15	16	17	18	19	20	21	22	23	24	25	26	27	28	29	30	Pos	Points
2018	Team BMW	BMW 125i M Sport	BRH; 1	BRH; 2	BRH; 3	DON; 1	DON; 2	DON; 3	THR; 1	THR; 2	THR; 3	OUL; 1	OUL; 2	OUL; 3	CRO; 1	CRO; 2	CRO; 3	SNE; 1	SNE; 2	SNE; 3	ROC; 1; 17	ROC; 2; 20	ROC; 3 DNS	KNO; 1; 11	KNO; 2; 12	KNO; 3; 23	SIL; 1; 3	SIL; 2; 4	SIL; 3; 10	BRH; 1; 16	BRH; 2; 18	BRH; 3; 13	25th	46
2022	Toyota Gazoo Racing UK	Toyota Corolla GR Sport	DON; 1 Ret	DON; 2 Ret	DON; 3; 15	BRH; 1; 26	BRH; 2; 17	BRH; 3; 20	THR; 1; 16	THR; 2; 17	THR; 3; 19	OUL; 1; 10	OUL; 2; 10	OUL; 3; 7	CRO; 1; 24	CRO; 2; 25	CRO; 3; 18	KNO; 1; 10	KNO; 2; 11	KNO; 3; 15	SNE; 1; 11	SNE; 2; 6	SNE; 3; 4	THR; 1; 22	THR; 2; 15	THR; 3; 13	SIL; 1; 8	SIL; 2 Ret	SIL; 3 Ret	BRH; 1; 14	BRH; 2; 16	BRH; 3; 11	16th	81
2023	Toyota Gazoo Racing UK	Toyota Corolla GR Sport	DON; 1; 6	DON; 2 Ret	DON; 3; 14	BRH; 1; 9	BRH; 2; 9	BRH; 3; 8*	SNE; 1 Ret	SNE; 2; 13	SNE; 3; 14	THR; 1; 11	THR; 2; 9	THR; 3; 5	OUL; 1; 4	OUL; 2; 9	OUL; 3; 9	CRO; 1; 11	CRO; 2; 8	CRO; 3; 15	KNO; 1; 3	KNO; 2; 6	KNO; 3; 5	DON; 1; 4	DON; 2; 6	DON; 3; 4	SIL; 1; 20	SIL; 2; 14	SIL; 3; 7	BRH; 1; 9	BRH; 2; 4	BRH; 3; 6	8th	217
2026	Team VERTU	Hyundai i30 Fastback N Performance	DON; 1 Ret^{12}	DON; 2; 8	**DON**; **3**; 3*	BRH; 1; 2*^{4}	BRH; 2; 3*	BRH; 3 Ret	SNE; 1; 8^{12}	SNE; 2; 2	SNE; 3; 21	OUL; 1; 14^{12}	OUL; 2; 7	OUL; 3; 2	THR; 1; 14	THR; 2; 11	THR; 3; 4	KNO; 1; 6^{8}	KNO; 2; 3	KNO; 3; 9	DON; 1; 8^{11}	DON; 2; 5	DON; 3 Ret	CRO; 1; 5^{7}	CRO; 2; 3	CRO; 3 Ret	SIL; 1	SIL; 2	SIL; 3	BRH; 1; 3^{5}	BRH; 2; 7	BRH; 3; 8*	7th	273

=== Complete GT World Challenge Europe results ===
==== GT World Challenge Europe Endurance Cup ====
Year	Team	Car	Class	1	2	3	4	5	6	7	Pos.	Points
2018	Rowe Racing	BMW M6 GT3	Pro	MNZ; Ret	SIL; Ret	LEC; Ret	SPA; 6H; 2	SPA; 12H; 55	SPA; 24H; Ret	CAT	36th	9
2019	R-Motorsport	Aston Martin V12 Vantage GT3	Silver	MNZ	SIL	LEC	SPA; 6H; 68	SPA; 12H; 68	SPA; 24H; Ret	CAT	NC	0
2020	Orange1 FFF Racing Team	Lamborghini Huracán GT3 Evo	Silver	IMO	NÜR; 28						24th	9
2020	Barwell Motorsport	Lamborghini Huracán GT3 Evo	Pro-Am			SPA; 6H; 26	SPA; 12H; 22	SPA; 24H; 15	LEC		41	7th
2021	Ram Racing	Mercedes-AMG GT3 Evo	Pro-Am	MNZ	LEC	SPA; 6H; 42	SPA; 12H; 32	SPA; 24H; 34	NÜR	CAT	36th	3
2024	Barwell Motorsport	Lamborghini Huracán GT3 Evo 2	Bronze	LEC	SPA; 6H; 42	SPA; 12H; 50	SPA; 24H; 35	NÜR	MNZ	JED; 32	35th	5
2025	Barwell Motorsport	Lamborghini Huracán GT3 Evo 2	Bronze	LEC	MNZ	SPA; 6H; 48	SPA; 12H; 38	SPA; 24H; 34	NÜR	CAT	39th	3

==== GT World Challenge Europe Sprint Cup ====
(key) (Races in bold indicate pole position) (Races in italics indicate fastest lap)

Year	Team	Car	Class	1	2	3	4	5	6	7	8	9	10	Pos.	Points
2019	R-Motorsport	Aston Martin Vantage AMR GT3	Pro	BRH; 1; 7	BRH; 2; 5	MIS; 1; 4	MIS; 2; 13	ZAN; 1; 7	ZAN; 2; 18	NÜR; 1; 7	NÜR; 2; 1	HUN; 1; 10	HUN; 2; 19	8th	39.5
2025	Barwell Motorsport	Lamborghini Huracán GT3 Evo 2	Gold	BRH; 1	BRH; 2	ZAN; 1	ZAN; 2	MIS; 1 Ret	MIS; 2; 27	MAG; 1; 24	MAG; 2; 25	VAL; 1	VAL; 2	8th	15

Sporting positions
Preceded by Dan Harper; Darren Leung	British GT Championship; Champion; 2024; With: Rob Collard	Succeeded by Kiern Jewiss; Charles Dawson
Preceded by Dan Harper; Darren Leung	British GT Championship; Pro-Am Champion; 2024; With: Rob Collard	Succeeded by Kiern Jewiss; Charles Dawson
