= 2016 BRDC British Formula 3 Championship =

Motor racing championship

The 2016 BRDC British F3 Championship is a motor racing championship for open wheel, formula racing cars held across England and, for the first time, Belgium. The 2016 season will be the first one under the BRDC British F3 denomination. The championship features professional motor racing teams, and will also feature the debut of the new 2-litre 230-bhp Tatuus-Cosworth single seat race car in the main series, a car that was first used in the 2015 BRDC Formula 4 Autumn Trophy. The season will begin at Snetterton 300 on 27 March and will end on 11 September at Donington Park, after eight triple header events for a total of twenty-four races.

== Teams and drivers ==
All teams are British-registered. Both Carlin and Double R Racing will make their debut in the series, along with Fortec who already entered the 2015 BRDC Formula 4 Autumn Trophy.

Team	No.	Driver	Rounds
Chris Dittmann Racing	2	(United States) Quinlan Lall	1–7
Chris Dittmann Racing	4	(United Kingdom) Omar Ismail	8
Chris Dittmann Racing	5	(Kenya) Jeremy Wahome	All
Chris Dittmann Racing	6	(India) Krishnaraaj Mahadik	2–8
Chris Dittmann Racing	12	(Netherlands) Paul Sieljes	1
HHC Motorsport	3	(United Kingdom) Ben Hingeley	All
HHC Motorsport	4	(United Kingdom) Omar Ismail	1
HHC Motorsport	10	(South Africa) Raoul Hyman	2
HHC Motorsport	37	(South Africa) Sisa Ngebulana	1–6
HHC Motorsport	45	(United Kingdom) Harrison Scott	5, 7–8
HHC Motorsport	54	(United Kingdom) Will Palmer	6
Fortec Motorsports	7	(Oman) Faisal Al Zubair	All
Fortec Motorsports	14	(India) Tarun Reddy	All
Lanan Racing	8	(United Kingdom) Toby Sowery	All
Lanan Racing	22	(India) Akhil Rabindra	All
Carlin	11	(United Kingdom) Ricky Collard	All
Carlin	15	(United Kingdom) James Pull	8
Carlin	31	(United Kingdom) Lando Norris	1, 3, 5–6
Carlin	51	(India) Ameya Vaidyanathan	1–4, 7
Carlin	98	(United States) Colton Herta	2, 4
Carlin	99	(Russia) Nikita Mazepin	7
Sean Walkinshaw Racing	21	(Denmark) Jan Jønck	1–5
Sean Walkinshaw Racing	23	(Australia) Thomas Maxwell	All
Sean Walkinshaw Racing	44	(South Africa) Eugene Denyssen	All
Hillspeed	25	(Bahrain) Ali Al Khalifa	4
Double R Racing	26	(Brazil) Matheus Leist	All
Double R Racing	27	(Finland) Aleksanteri Huovinen	All
Double R Racing	85	(Brazil) Enzo Bortoleto	All
Douglas Motorsport	49	(Australia) Thomas Randle	All
Douglas Motorsport	65	(United Kingdom) Enaam Ahmed	All

== Race calendar and results ==
The calendar was published on 27 October 2015. The series will support British GT at nearly all events, with the exception being the season-opening Snetterton 300 round. For the first time, the series will travel abroad, having a round at Spa-Francorchamps in Belgium.

Round		Circuit	Date	Pole position	Fastest lap	Winning driver	Winning team
1	R1	(United Kingdom) Snetterton Circuit (300 Circuit, Norfolk)	27 March	(United Kingdom) Lando Norris	(United Kingdom) Lando Norris	(United Kingdom) Lando Norris	Carlin
1	R2	(United Kingdom) Snetterton Circuit (300 Circuit, Norfolk)	28 March		(United Kingdom) Toby Sowery	(Brazil) Matheus Leist	Double R Racing
1	R3	(United Kingdom) Snetterton Circuit (300 Circuit, Norfolk)	28 March		(United Kingdom) Lando Norris	(United Kingdom) Enaam Ahmed	Douglas Motorsport
2	R4	(United Kingdom) Brands Hatch (Grand Prix Circuit, Kent)	16 April	(Brazil) Matheus Leist	(Brazil) Matheus Leist	(Brazil) Matheus Leist	Double R Racing
2	R5	(United Kingdom) Brands Hatch (Grand Prix Circuit, Kent)	17 April		(United States) Colton Herta	(United Kingdom) Toby Sowery	Lanan Racing
2	R6	(United Kingdom) Brands Hatch (Grand Prix Circuit, Kent)	17 April		(United Kingdom) Ricky Collard	(United States) Colton Herta	Carlin
3	R7	(United Kingdom) Rockingham (National Circuit, Northamptonshire)	30 April	(United Kingdom) Lando Norris	(Brazil) Matheus Leist	(United Kingdom) Lando Norris	Carlin
3	R8	(United Kingdom) Rockingham (National Circuit, Northamptonshire)	1 May		(United Kingdom) Lando Norris	(Australia) Thomas Randle	Douglas Motorsport
3	R9	(United Kingdom) Rockingham (National Circuit, Northamptonshire)	1 May		(United Kingdom) Ricky Collard	(United Kingdom) Ricky Collard	Carlin
4	R10	(United Kingdom) Oulton Park (International Circuit, Cheshire)	28 May	(United Kingdom) Ricky Collard	(Australia) Thomas Randle	(United Kingdom) Ricky Collard	Carlin
4	R11	(United Kingdom) Oulton Park (International Circuit, Cheshire)	30 May		(United Kingdom) Ricky Collard	(United Kingdom) Toby Sowery	Lanan Racing
4	R12	(United Kingdom) Oulton Park (International Circuit, Cheshire)	30 May		(United States) Colton Herta	(United Kingdom) Ricky Collard	Carlin
5	R13	(United Kingdom) Silverstone Circuit (Grand Prix, Northamptonshire)	11 June	(Australia) Thomas Randle	(Brazil) Matheus Leist	(Brazil) Matheus Leist	Double R Racing
5	R14	(United Kingdom) Silverstone Circuit (Grand Prix, Northamptonshire)	12 June		(United Kingdom) Toby Sowery	(United Kingdom) Toby Sowery	Lanan Racing
5	R15	(United Kingdom) Silverstone Circuit (Grand Prix, Northamptonshire)	12 June		Race cancelled due to heavy rain		
6	R16	Spa-Francorchamps (Belgium)	8 July	(United Kingdom) Lando Norris	(United Kingdom) Toby Sowery	(United Kingdom) Lando Norris	Carlin
6	R17	Spa-Francorchamps (Belgium)	9 July		(United Kingdom) Will Palmer	(Australia) Thomas Randle	Douglas Motorsport
6	R18	Spa-Francorchamps (Belgium)	9 July		(Brazil) Matheus Leist	(United Kingdom) Lando Norris	Carlin
7	R19	(United Kingdom) Snetterton Circuit (300 Circuit, Norfolk)	6 August	(United Kingdom) Ricky Collard	(United Kingdom) Ricky Collard	(United Kingdom) Ricky Collard	Carlin
7	R20	(United Kingdom) Snetterton Circuit (300 Circuit, Norfolk)	7 August		(United Kingdom) Ben Hingeley	(Russia) Nikita Mazepin	Carlin
7	R21	(United Kingdom) Snetterton Circuit (300 Circuit, Norfolk)	7 August		(Brazil) Matheus Leist	(United Kingdom) Ricky Collard	Carlin
8	R22	(United Kingdom) Donington Park (Grand Prix Circuit, Leicestershire)	10 September	(United Kingdom) Ben Hingeley	(Brazil) Matheus Leist	(Brazil) Matheus Leist	Double R Racing
8	R23	(United Kingdom) Donington Park (Grand Prix Circuit, Leicestershire)	11 September		(United Kingdom) Toby Sowery	(United Kingdom) Toby Sowery	Lanan Racing
8	R24	(United Kingdom) Donington Park (Grand Prix Circuit, Leicestershire)	11 September		(United Kingdom) Toby Sowery	(United Kingdom) Toby Sowery	Lanan Racing

== Championship standings ==
Scoring system

Points were awarded to the top 20 classified finishers in all races.

Races	Position, points per race																			
Races	1st	2nd	3rd	4th	5th	6th	7th	8th	9th	10th	11th	12th	13th	14th	15th	16th	17th	18th	19th	20th
Races 1 & 3	35	29	24	21	19	17	15	13	12	11	10	9	8	7	6	5	4	3	2	1
Race 2	25	22	20	18	16	15	14	13	12	11	10	9	8	7	6	5	4	3	2	1

=== Drivers' championship ===
Pos.	Driver	SNE (United Kingdom)			BRH (United Kingdom)			ROC (United Kingdom)			OUL (United Kingdom)			SIL (United Kingdom)			SPA (Belgium)			SNE (United Kingdom)			DON (United Kingdom)			Points
Pos.	Driver	R1	R2	R3	R1	R2	R3	R1	R2	R3	R1	R2	R3	R1	R2	R3	R1	R2	R3	R1	R2	R3	R1	R2	R3	Points
1	(Brazil) Matheus Leist	10	1	4	**1**	Ret	Ret	3	4	2	4	4	5	1	3	C	2	5	2	2	6	2	1	5	5	493
2	(United Kingdom) Ricky Collard	5	Ret	8	2	4	2	2	7	1	**1**	8	1	4	13	C	3	6	6	**1**	7	1	Ret	10	6	466
3	(United Kingdom) Toby Sowery	4	3	2	3	1	13	14	8	6	7	1	7	7	1	C	5	2	4	3	5	7	4	1	1	457
4	(Australia) Thomas Randle	20	9	5	4	5	3	4	1	4	2	7	2	**2**	4	C	9	1	5	6	4	6	NC	8	3	424
5	(United Kingdom) Enaam Ahmed	3	2	1	Ret	17	14	6	19	5	8	2	4	5	5	C	4	4	19	Ret	17	4	6	6	2	349
6	(India) Tarun Reddy	16	Ret	12	5	2	Ret	8	6	8	15	21	14	3	7	C	6	3	9	7	2	9	12	7	7	284
7	(Australia) Thomas Maxwell	11	7	9	9	8	7	9	9	9	9	10	12	9	16	C	15	13	7	13	13	12	5	3	9	265
8	(United Kingdom) Lando Norris	**1**	6	3				**1**	3	3				Ret	2	C	**1**	19	1							247
9	(Finland) Aleksanteri Huovinen	2	4	6	Ret	13	5	5	5	7	14	19	11	16	10	C	Ret	15	16	9	8	11	7	Ret	14	245
10	(United Kingdom) Ben Hingeley	6	14	Ret	15	16	11	11	13	16	11	14	15	13	6	C	7	8	10	4	17	3	**3**	14	Ret	232
11	(Brazil) Enzo Bortoleto	8	8	11	8	3	15	12	DNS	12	6	3	6	DNS	8	C	10	10	12	11	9	13	Ret	Ret	Ret	220
12	(Oman) Al Faisal Al Zubair	13	11	13	6	7	10	15	14	11	16	13	20	14	15	C	8	9	14	14	12	15	13	13	13	196
13	(South Africa) Eugene Denyssen	14	17	15	13	9	12	17	15	Ret	13	11	17	10	14	C	11	14	8	10	10	16	8	2	15	194
14	(South Africa) Sisa Ngebulana	9	5	7	12	6	4	16	12	13	DSQ	15	10	6	DSQ	C	13	7	11							177
15	(United States) Quinlan Lall	18	12	14	Ret	10	8	10	11	10	10	9	9	12	Ret	C	Ret	16	13	18	18	10				149
16	(Denmark) Jan Jønck	7	10	20	11	12	Ret	13	10	14	5	5	8	8	12	C										142
17	(United Kingdom) Harrison Scott													Ret	17	C				5	3	5	2	4	4	130
18	(India) Akhil Rabindra	19	13	18	NC	15	9	19	17	Ret	17	16	16	11	11	C	Ret	18	17	15	16	17	10	12	11	124
19	(United States) Colton Herta				10	NC	1				3	6	3													109
20	(India) Krishnaraaj Mahadik				14	11	6	20	20	Ret	12	12	13	DNS	DNS	C	14	12	15	16	15	Ret	14	DNS	DNS	103
21	(Kenya) Jeremy Wahome	17	16	19	EX	Ret	16	18	18	Ret	18	17	19	15	9	C	12	17	18	17	14	18	Ret	15	10	98
22	(India) Ameya Vaidyanathan	15	18	10	Ret	14	Ret	7	2	Ret	Ret	20	18							12	11	14				95
23	(Russia) Nikita Mazepin																			8	1	8				51
24	(United Kingdom) Omar Ismail	12	Ret	16																			9	9	12	47
25	(United Kingdom) Will Palmer																16	11	3							39
26	(United Kingdom) James Pull																						11	11	8	33
27	(South Africa) Raoul Hyman				7	Ret	Ret																			15
28	(Netherlands) Paul Sieljes	Ret	15	17																						10
29	(Bahrain) Ali Al Khalifa										19	18	21													5
Pos.	Driver	R1	R2	R3	R1	R2	R3	R1	R2	R3	R1	R2	R3	R1	R2	R3	R1	R2	R3	R1	R2	R3	R1	R2	R3	Points
Pos.	Driver	SNE (United Kingdom)			BRH (United Kingdom)			ROC (United Kingdom)			OUL (United Kingdom)			SIL (United Kingdom)			SPA (Belgium)			SNE (United Kingdom)			DON (United Kingdom)			Points

Colour	Result
Gold	Winner
Silver	Second place
Bronze	Third place
Green	Points classification
Blue	Non-points classification
Blue	Non-classified finish (NC)
Purple	Retired, not classified (Ret)
Red	Did not qualify (DNQ)
Red	Did not pre-qualify (DNPQ)
Black	Disqualified (DSQ)
White	Did not start (DNS)
White	Withdrew (WD)
White	Race cancelled (C)
Blank	Did not practice (DNP)
Blank	Did not arrive (DNA)
Blank	Excluded (EX)

**Bold** – Pole
Italics – Fastest Lap

== 2016 BRDC British Formula 3 Autumn Trophy ==
The 2016 BRDC British Formula 3 Autumn Trophy was a four-race motor racing championship held at Snetterton 300 in England on October 29–30, as an off-season trophy to the BRDC British Formula 3 Championship. The trophy featured a mix of professional motor racing teams and privately funded drivers running the same 2-litre 230-bhp Tatuus-Cosworth single seat race car used in the main championship.

=== Teams and drivers ===
All teams were British-registered. Drivers in italics are not eligible for trophy points.

Team	No.	Driver
Hillspeed with Cliff Dempsey Racing	7	(Oman) Abdullah Al Rawahi
Hillspeed with Cliff Dempsey Racing	45	(Thailand) Sasakorn Chaimongkol
Carlin	15	(United Kingdom) James Pull
Carlin	28	(United States) Cameron Das
Carlin	65	(United Kingdom) Enaam Ahmed
Fortec Motorsport	16	(South Africa) Callan O'Keeffe
Fortec Motorsport	77	(United Kingdom) Ben Hingeley
Double R Racing	26	(United Kingdom) Dan Ticktum
Double R Racing	27	(New Zealand) Marcus Armstrong
Double R Racing	85	(India) Tarun Reddy
Douglas Motorsport	38	(United Kingdom) Jamie Caroline
Douglas Motorsport	96	(Australia) Joey Mawson

=== Race calendar and results ===
The race calendar consisted of a 4-race event held at the Snetterton 300. The weekend format includes a 20-minute qualifying session and two 12-lap races on both Saturday and Sunday. The grid for the first race in each day was set in qualifying order, with starting positions for race two of each day set by the fastest laps from race one.

Due to adverse weather, the Sunday qualifying wasn't held and the two races were shortened to 8 laps. For race 3, the drivers were classified on the grid by championship order. Race 4 was ultimately cancelled due to the conditions worsening.

Round		Circuit	Date	Pole position	Fastest lap	Winning driver	Winning team
AT	R1	Snetterton Circuit (300 Circuit, Norfolk)	29 October	(United Kingdom) Enaam Ahmed	(United Kingdom) Dan Ticktum	(United Kingdom) Enaam Ahmed	Carlin
AT	R2	Snetterton Circuit (300 Circuit, Norfolk)	29 October		(New Zealand) Marcus Armstrong	(United Kingdom) Dan Ticktum	Double R Racing
AT	R3	Snetterton Circuit (300 Circuit, Norfolk)	30 October	(United Kingdom) Enaam Ahmed	(Australia) Joey Mawson	(United Kingdom) Enaam Ahmed	Carlin
AT	R4	Snetterton Circuit (300 Circuit, Norfolk)	30 October	Race cancelled due to heavy fog			

=== Trophy standings ===
Scoring system

Points were awarded to the top 20 classified finishers in all races as follows.

Position	**1st**	**2nd**	**3rd**	**4th**	**5th**	**6th**	**7th**	**8th**	**9th**	**10th**	**11th**	**12th**	**13th**	**14th**	**15th**	**16th**	**17th**	**18th**	**19th**	**20th**
Points	35	29	24	21	19	17	15	13	12	11	10	9	8	7	6	5	4	3	2	1

Autumn Trophy

Pos.	Driver	SNE				Points
Pos.	Driver	R1	R2	R3	R4	Points
1	(United Kingdom) Enaam Ahmed	**1**	2	**1**	C	99
2	(Australia) Joey Mawson	2	3	2	C	82
3	(South Africa) Callan O'Keeffe	4	6	4	C	61
4	(United Kingdom) Dan Ticktum	3	1	Ret	C	59
5	(United Kingdom) Jamie Caroline	8	9	3	C	52
6	(India) Tarun Reddy	6	5	9	C	51
7	(United States) Cameron Das	9	10	5	C	44
8	(United Kingdom) James Pull	5	7	Ret	C	36
9	(Oman) Abdullah Al Rawahi	12	11	8	C	36
10	(Thailand) Sasakorn Chaimongkol	11	Ret	6	C	29
11	(United Kingdom) Ben Hingeley	10	8	Ret	C	27
Drivers ineligible to score points
	(New Zealand) Marcus Armstrong	7	4	7	C	0
Pos.	Driver	R1	R2	R3	R4	Points
Pos.	Driver	SNE				Points

Colour	Result
Gold	Winner
Silver	Second place
Bronze	Third place
Green	Points classification
Blue	Non-points classification
Blue	Non-classified finish (NC)
Purple	Retired, not classified (Ret)
Red	Did not qualify (DNQ)
Red	Did not pre-qualify (DNPQ)
Black	Disqualified (DSQ)
White	Did not start (DNS)
White	Withdrew (WD)
White	Race cancelled (C)
Blank	Did not practice (DNP)
Blank	Did not arrive (DNA)
Blank	Excluded (EX)

**Bold** – Pole
Italics – Fastest Lap
