= GT300 =

The GT300 may refer to:

- A Super GT car category features Group GT3 and JAF-GT300.
- The GT300 family of graphics processors from Nvidia
- The first-generation General Motors Whirlfire Turbo-power gas turbine engine of 1953
