= Raoul Hyman =

South African racing driver

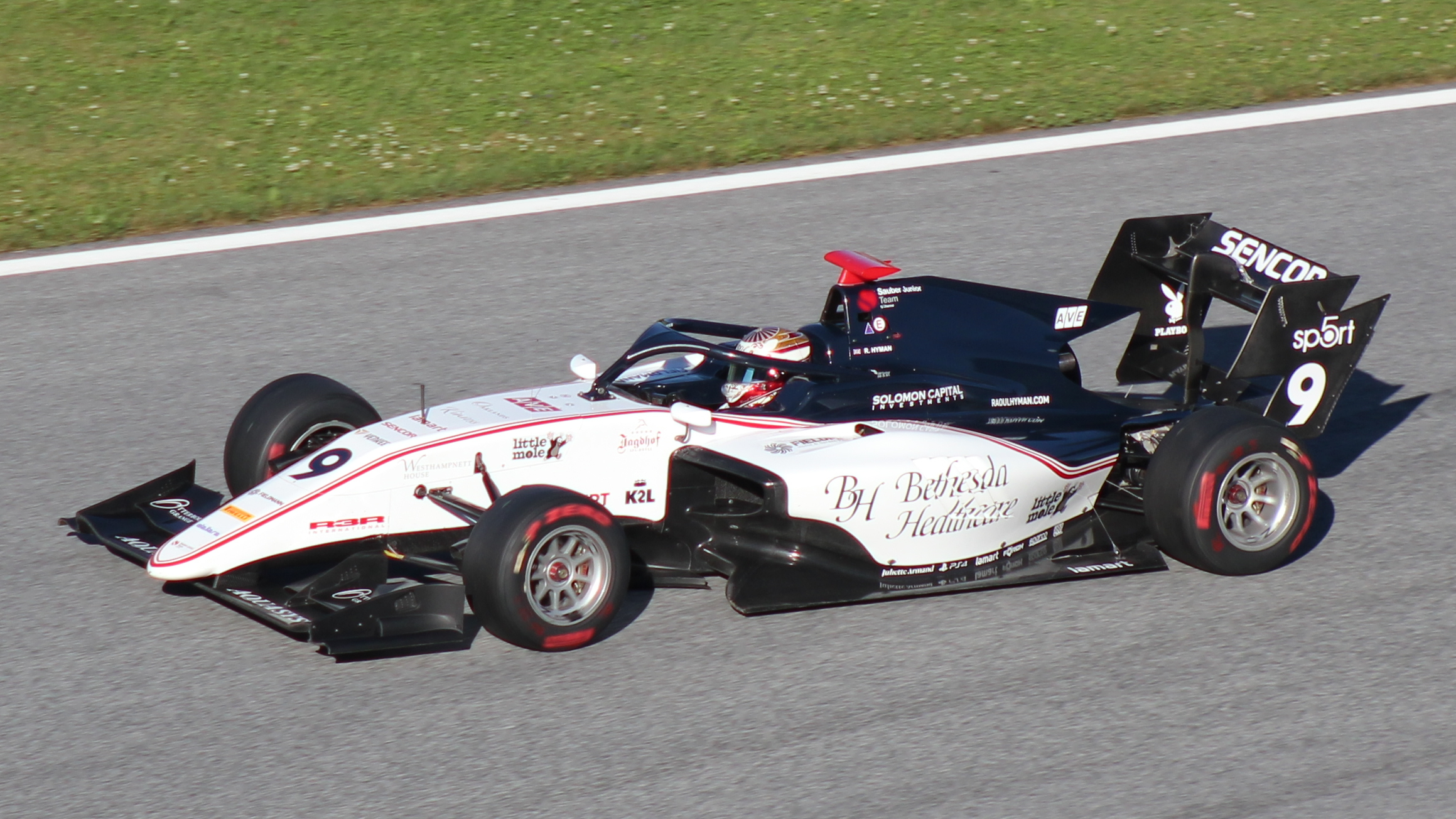
- Hyman at the Red Bull Ring in 2019.
- Nationality: (South Africa) South African
- Born: Raoul Joshua Hyman; 12 May 1996 (age 30) Durban, South Africa
- Relatives: Christopher Hyman (father)

Super Formula Championship career
- Debut season: 2023
- Current team: B-Max Racing
- Categorisation: FIA Gold
- Car number: 51
- Starts: 9 (9 entries)
- Wins: 0
- Poles: 0
- Fastest laps: 0
- Best finish: 25th in 2023

Previous series
- 2022 2019 2019 2018 2017 2017 2016 2015-16 2013-14: Formula Regional Americas; FIA Formula 3 Championship; Toyota Racing Series; F3 Asian Championship; Euroformula Open Championship; GP3 Series; BRDC British Formula 3 FIA Formula 3 European; BRDC Formula 4

Championship titles
- 2022 2018: Formula Regional Americas; F3 Asian Championship

Raoul Joshua Hyman (born 12 May 1996) is a South African racing driver, he has competed in the Super Formula Championship for B-Max Racing. He is the 2022 Formula Regional Americas and 2018 F3 Asian Champion.

== Career ==
=== Lower formulae ===
Hyman made his car racing debut in 2013, competing in the BRDC Formula 4 Championship with HHC Motorsport. He finished seventh in the standings, having taken four podiums.

Hyman returned to BRDC F4 in 2014, once again driving for HHC alongside Sennan Fielding and Will Palmer. He started his season out strongly, winning the season opener at Silverstone from pole position, before achieving the same feat weeks later at Brands Hatch, where he fended off a charging Arjun Maini in the closing laps. A pair of podiums at the next two events respectively followed, as Hyman elevated himself into the championship battle. However, scoring only one podium from the second round at Silverstone and none at Brands Hatch made him fall back compared to rivals Maini and George Russell. Nevertheless, Hyman ended his season strongly, winning at Donington Park and taking another victory and a second place at the final round in Snetterton, which meant that he finished third in the standings.

=== FIA Formula 3 European ===
In 2015, Hyman progressed to the FIA Formula 3 European Championship, where he raced for Team West-Tec F3. The campaign proved to be disappointing, with Hyman taking a best finish of sixth at Monza, which resulted in 21st place in the overall standings.

Hyman partnered up with Carlin to contest European F3 the following year. However, following the season opener, he left the series, having scored a solitary point.

=== GP3 Series ===
After competing in a one-off round of the BRDC British F3 Championship the previous year, Hyman returned to a full-time race seat in 2017, driving for Campos Racing in the GP3 Series. Points at the season opener were followed by a victory during the Sprint Race in Austria, where the South African controlled his gap to rival Giuliano Alesi to take his first victory in nearly three years. This would end up being the highlight of Hyman's season, as he ended up 13th in the standings, having scored just two more points at the Hungaroring.

=== F3 Asian Championship ===
For the 2018 season, Hyman would contest the inaugural season F3 Asian Championship, partnering Jake Hughes and Hon Chio Leong at Dragon HitechGP. Whilst Hughes, who only competed in three events, would win every race he competed in, Hyman would end up taking the title, having scored eleven podiums over the course of the campaign, which included a win at Ningbo, by a mere two points.

=== FIA Formula 3 ===
Having raced in the Toyota Racing Series at the start of the 2019 season, where he finished fourth in the standings with four podiums, Hyman planted himself into the newly formed FIA Formula 3 Championship, where he would drive for Sauber Junior Team by Charouz. He would end up having an unsuccessful season, finishing 22nd, with two points coming from the season finale at Sochi.

=== Formula Regional Americas ===
Following a two-year hiatus from racing, which he called "two of the worst years I've ever had", Hyman returned in 2022, driving for TJ Speed Motorsports in the Formula Regional Americas Championship. He experienced a dominant campaign, in which he won eleven races, whilst only missing the podium twice. His title victory would earn him a $600,000 prize to compete in the Super Formula Championship.

=== Super Formula ===
At the end of 2022, it was announced that Hyman would be driving for B-Max Racing in Super Formula the following year.

== Personal life ==
Hyman was born in South Africa and moved to London, United Kingdom at the age of fifteen.

Hyman has Indian ancestry.

== Racing record ==
=== Racing career summary ===
Season	Series	Team	Races	Wins	Poles	F/Laps	Podiums	Points	Position
2013	BRDC Formula 4 Championship	HHC Motorsport	24	0	0	0	4	289	7th
2014	BRDC Formula 4 Championship	HHC Motorsport	24	4	2	3	11	465	**3rd**
2015	FIA Formula 3 European Championship	Team West-Tec F3	32	0	0	0	0	14.5	21st
2016	FIA Formula 3 European Championship	Carlin	3	0	0	0	0	1	22nd
2016	BRDC British Formula 3 Championship	HHC Motorsport	3	0	0	0	0	15	27th
2017	GP3 Series	Campos Racing	15	1	0	0	1	27	13th
2017	Euroformula Open Championship	Campos Racing	2	0	1	0	1	28	13th
2018	F3 Asian Championship	Hitech GP	15	1	0	2	11	227	**1st**
2019	FIA Formula 3 Championship	Sauber Junior Team by Charouz	16	0	0	0	0	2	22nd
2019	Toyota Racing Series	Giles Motorsport	15	0	1	0	4	268	4th
2022	Formula Regional Americas Championship	TJ Speed Motorsports	18	11	6	12	16	362	**1st**
2022	Indian Racing League	Goa Aces	1	0	0	0	0	0	NC
2023	Super Formula	B-Max Racing	9	0	0	0	0	0	25th
2023	Indian Racing League	Goa Aces	3	2	1	3	3	87‡	**1st‡**
2024	Indian Racing League	Goa Aces	5	3	2	3	3	167‡	**1st‡**
2025–26	Indian Racing League	Goa Aces JA Racing	5	4	2	4	4	107‡	**1st‡**

‡ Team standings.

^{*} Season still in progress.

=== Complete BRDC Formula 4 Championship results ===
(key) (Races in bold indicate pole position) (Races in italics indicate points for the fastest lap of top ten finishers)

Year	Team	1	2	3	4	5	6	7	8	9	10	11	12	13	14	15	16	17	18	19	20	21	22	23	24	DC	Points
2013	HHC Motorsport	SIL1; 1 Ret	SIL1; 2; 12	SIL1; 3; 11	BRH1; 1; 18	BRH1; 2; 13	BRH1; 3; 3	SNE1; 1; 4	SNE1; 2; 2	SNE1; 3 DSQ	OUL; 1; 5	OUL; 2; 3	OUL; 3; 5	BRH2; 1; 8	BRH2; 2; 3	BRH2; 3; 10	SIL2; 1; 7	SIL2; 2; 10	SIL2; 3; 6	SNE2; 1; 15	SNE2; 2; 10	SNE2; 3; 15	DON; 1; 10	DON; 2; 7	DON; 3; 5	7th	290
2014	HHC Motorsport	**SIL1**; **1**; 1	SIL1; 2; 4	SIL1; 3; 10	**BRH1**; **1**; 1	BRH1; 2; 10	BRH1; 3; 3	SNE1; 1; 2	SNE1; 2; 13	SNE1; 3; 3	OUL; 1; 2	OUL; 2; 2	OUL; 3 Ret	SIL2; 1; 6	SIL2; 2; 7	SIL2; 3; 2	BRH2; 1; 4	BRH2; 2; 4	BRH2; 3; 12	DON; 1; 7	DON; 2; 1	DON; 3 Ret	SNE2; 1; 6	SNE2; 2; 1	SNE2; 3; 2	3rd	465

=== Complete FIA Formula 3 European Championship results ===
(key) (Races in bold indicate pole position) (Races in italics indicate fastest lap)

Year	Entrant	Engine	1	2	3	4	5	6	7	8	9	10	11	12	13	14	15	16	17	18	19	20	21	22	23	24	25	26	27	28	29	30	31	32	33	DC	Points
2015	Team West-Tec F3	Mercedes	SIL; 1; 19	SIL; 2; 27	SIL; 3; 28	HOC; 1 Ret	HOC; 2; 13	HOC; 3; 16	PAU; 1; 16	PAU; 2; 22	PAU; 3; 26	MNZ; 1; 6	MNZ; 2; 10	MNZ; 3; 12	SPA; 1; 30	SPA; 2; 8	SPA; 3 Ret	NOR; 1 Ret	NOR; 2; 18	NOR; 3; 18	ZAN; 1; 14	ZAN; 2; 14	ZAN; 3; 11	RBR; 1; 11	RBR; 2; 11	RBR; 3; 14	ALG; 1; 19	ALG; 2 Ret	ALG; 3; 18	NÜR; 1; 16	NÜR; 2; 19	NÜR; 3 Ret	HOC; 1 Ret	HOC; 2 Ret	HOC; 3; 10	21st	14.5
2016	Carlin	Volkswagen	LEC; 1; 18	LEC; 2; 10	LEC; 3; 13	HUN; 1	HUN; 2	HUN; 3	PAU; 1	PAU; 2	PAU; 3	RBR; 1	RBR; 2	RBR; 3	NOR; 1	NOR; 2	NOR; 3	ZAN; 1	ZAN; 2	ZAN; 3	SPA; 1	SPA; 2	SPA; 3	NÜR; 1	NÜR; 2	NÜR; 3	IMO; 1	IMO; 2	IMO; 3	HOC; 1	HOC; 2	HOC; 3				22nd	1

=== Complete GP3 Series results ===
(key) (Races in bold indicate pole position) (Races in italics indicate fastest lap)

Year	Entrant	1	2	3	4	5	6	7	8	9	10	11	12	13	14	15	16	Pos	Points
2017	Campos Racing	CAT; FEA; 8	CAT; SPR; 7	RBR; FEA; 8	RBR; SPR; 1	SIL; FEA; 16	SIL; SPR; 11	HUN; FEA; 14	HUN; SPR; 7	SPA; FEA; 14	SPA; SPR; 10	MNZ; FEA; 11	MNZ; SPR; C	JER; FEA; 19	JER; SPR; 15	YMC; FEA; 13	YMC; SPR; 11	13th	27

=== Complete F3 Asian Championship results ===
(key) (Races in bold indicate pole position) (Races in italics indicate fastest lap)

Year	Entrant	1	2	3	4	5	6	7	8	9	10	11	12	13	14	15	Pos	Points
2018	Dragon HitechGP	SEP1; 1; 3	SEP1; 2; 2	SEP1; 3; 3	NIS1; 1; 5	NIS1; 2; 1	NIS1; 3; 3	SIC; 1; 2	SIC; 2; 8	SIC; 3; 2	NIS2; 1; 2	NIS2; 2; 2	NIS2; 3; 2	SEP2; 1; 5	SEP2; 2; 3	SEP2; 3; 5	1st	227

=== Complete Toyota Racing Series results ===
(key) (Races in bold indicate pole position) (Races in italics indicate fastest lap)

Year	Team	1	2	3	4	5	6	7	8	9	10	11	12	13	14	15	16	17	DC	Points
2019	Giles Motorsport	**HIG**; **1**; 4	HIG; 2; 2	HIG; 3; 3	TER; 1; 11	TER; 2 C	TER; 3 C	HMP; 1; 5	HMP; 2; 2	HMP; 3; 9	HMP; 4; 10	TAU; 1; 5	TAU; 2; 3	TAU; 3; 6	TAU; 4; 5	MAN; 1; 9	MAN; 2; 6	MAN; 3; 4	4th	270

=== Complete FIA Formula 3 Championship results ===
(key) (Races in bold indicate pole position; races in italics indicate points for the fastest lap of top ten finishers)

Year	Entrant	1	2	3	4	5	6	7	8	9	10	11	12	13	14	15	16	DC	Points
2019	Sauber Junior Team by Charouz	CAT; FEA; 21	CAT; SPR; Ret	LEC; FEA; 17	LEC; SPR; 13	RBR; FEA; 19	RBR; SPR; 16	SIL; FEA; Ret	SIL; SPR; 18	HUN; FEA; 22	HUN; SPR; 25	SPA; FEA; 26	SPA; SPR; Ret	MNZ; FEA; 15	MNZ; SPR; 17	SOC; FEA; 9	SOC; SPR; 13	22nd	2

=== Complete Formula Regional Americas Championship results ===
(key) (Races in bold indicate pole position) (Races in italics indicate fastest lap)

Year	Team	1	2	3	4	5	6	7	8	9	10	11	12	13	14	15	16	17	18	DC	Points
2022	TJ Speed Motorsports	**NOL**; **1**; 2	NOL; 2; 1	NOL; 3; 3	**ROA**; **1**; 1	ROA; 2; 2	ROA; 3; 1	**MOH**; **1**; 1	MOH; 2; 1	MOH; 3; 1	**NJM**; **1**; 1	NJM; 2; 2	NJM; 3; 2	**VIR**; **1**; 11†	VIR; 2; 1	VIR; 3; 1	**COA**; **1**; 1	COA; 2 Ret	COA; 3; 1	1st	362

=== Complete Indian Racing League results ===
(key) (Races in bold indicate pole position) (Races in italics indicate fastest lap)

Year	Franchise	1	2	3	4	5	6	7	8	9	10	11	12	Pos.	Pts
2022	Goa Aces	HYD1; 1 C	HYD1; 2 C	HYD1; 3 C	IRU1; 1	IRU1; 2 Ret	IRU1; 3 DNS	IRU2; 1	IRU2; 2	IRU2; 3	HYD2; 1	HYD2; 2	HYD2; 3	NC	0
2023‡	Goa Aces	IRU1; 1; 2	IRU1; 2	**IRU2**; **1**; 1	IRU2; 2	IRU3; 1	IRU3; 2; 1							1st	87
2024‡	Goa Aces	IRU1; 1 Ret	IRU1; 2	IGR; 1; 1	IGR; 2	IRU2; 1; 5	IRU2; 2	KAR1; 1	**KAR1**; **2**; 1	KAR2; 1	**KAR2**; **2**; 1			1st	167

‡ Standings based on entry points, not individual drivers.

* Season in progress.

=== Complete Super Formula results ===
(key) (Races in bold indicate pole position; races in italics indicate fastest lap)

Year	Team	Engine	1	2	3	4	5	6	7	8	9	DC	Points
2023	B-Max Racing	Honda	FUJ; 16	FUJ; 18	SUZ; 18	AUT; 17	SUG; 18	FUJ; Ret	MOT; 15	SUZ; 21	SUZ; 18	25th	0

Sporting positions
Preceded by Inaugural	F3 Asian Championship; Champion; 2018	Succeeded by Ukyo Sasahara
Preceded by Kyffin Simpson	Formula Regional Americas Championship; Champion; 2022	Succeeded by Incumbent
