= Hillspeed =

British motorsport team

(United Kingdom) Hillspeed
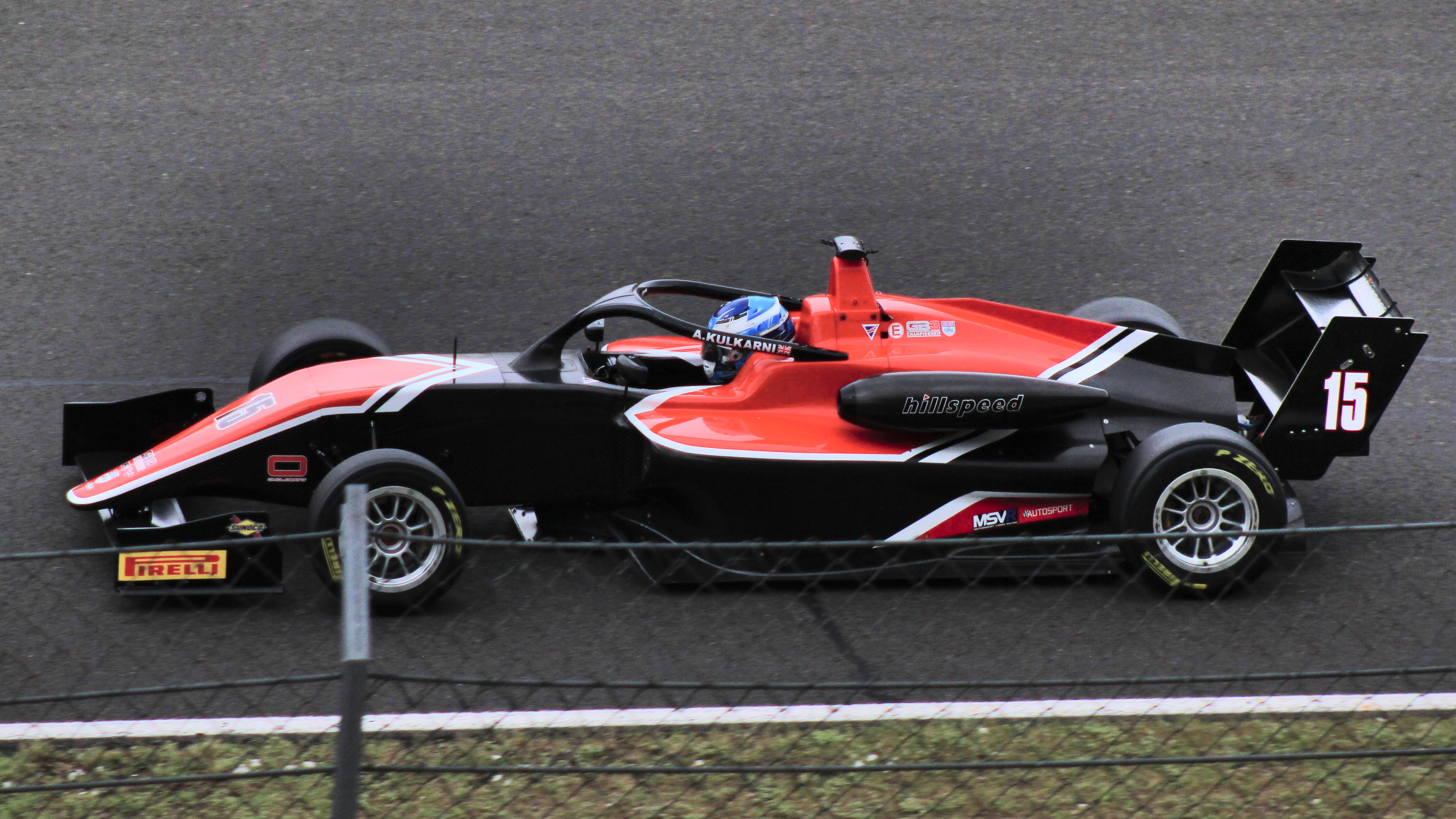
- Founded: 1970
- Base: Markham Vale, Chesterfield, Derbyshire
- Team principal(s): Richard Ollerenshaw
- Founder(s): Morgan Ollerenshaw
- Current series: GB3 Championship; GB4 Championship
- Former series: British Saloon Car Championship; ARP Formula 3 Championship; Formula Renault 2.0 UK; BARC Formula Renault; Ginetta Juniors; Ginetta GT Supercup
- Current drivers: GB3 Championship: 10. (Australia) Dante Vinci; 11. (Australia) Peter Bouzinelos; 12. (Brazil) Aurelia Nobels; GB4 Championship: 6. (United States) Demitri Nolan; 7. (Sweden) Enzo Hallman; 99. (United States) Connor Willis
- Noted drivers: (United Kingdom) Tom Ingram (Germany) Jusuf Owega (United Kingdom) Alice Powell (Argentina) Nicolás Varrone (United Kingdom) Seb Morris (Oman) Ahmad Al Harthy (United Kingdom) Freddie Slater (United States) Leandro Juncos
- Drivers' Championships: 2010 Formula Renault (Alice Powell); 2010 Ginetta Juniors (Tom Ingram); 2011 Ginetta Juniors (Seb Morris); 2012 Ginetta Juniors (Rookie Cup) (Pepe Massot)
- Website: hillspeed.co.uk

Hillspeed is a British auto racing team, based in Chesterfield, Derbyshire, United Kingdom. Formerly Hillspeed Racing and Hill Speed Racing, the team was founded in 1970 to support Morgan Ollerenshaw's entry in the British Saloon Car Championship (now British Touring Car Championship). It currently participates in the GB3 Championship and the GB4 Championship.

== History ==
The team was founded in 1970 as Hill Speed Racing to support Morgan Ollerenshaw's entry in 1970 season of the British Saloon Car Championship, now known as British Touring Car Championship. It is possible that the team is named after Hill Top (located at the outskirts of Sheffield), where the team was formerly based. According to an Autosport article in 2020, the team has become a "promine fixture" in United Kingdom motorsport after 50 years of existence.

=== GB3 Championship ===
Hillspeed joined the GB3 Championship when it was founded in 2013 as BRDC Formula 4 Championship. For this season, the team signed Seb Morris, Struan Moore and Rahul Raj Mayer.

Alfredo Zabalza, Gustavo Lima were signed for the team in the 2014 season. Rahul Raj Mayer also stayed with the team for his sophomore season.

For the 2015 season, the team signed Al Faisal Al Zubair, Ameya Vaidyanathan and Sebastian Lanzetti. Riki Christodoulou and Hernán Fallas also drove for the team for a part-time basis.

In the 2016 season, when the BRDC F4 was renamed to BRDC F3, Hillspeed signed Bahraini driver Ali Al Khalifa for a part-time entry.

For the 2017 season, Hillspeed entered into cooperation with Cliff Dempsey Racing. The cooperated entry signed three drivers: Chase Owen, Jordan Cane and Nick Worm. Later, Jordan Cane moved to Douglas Motorsport without driving for Hillspeed.

Hillspeed signed Ben Hurst, Sasakorn Chaimongkol and Jusuf Owega for the 2018 season.

In 2019, the team reduced to a two-car entry, as Sasakorn Chaimongkol remained with the team and Nicolás Varrone drove for the team in selected rounds.

For the 2020 season, Sasakorn Chaimongkol stayed with Hillspeed for his third BRDC F3 season. The team signed Oliver Clarke for the second car.

Jonathan Browne and Flynn Jackes drove for the team for a part-time basis in 2021, when the BRDC F3 was renamed to GB3 Championship.

2022 saw the team field only one car for Canadian driver Nick Gilkes.

In 2023, the team partnered with Hitech Grand Prix to field two Hitech GP Academy drivers: Gerrard Xie and Daniel Mavlyutov.

Hillspeed signed Indian driver Aditya Kulkarni for the team's only full-time entry in the 2024 season. Later, they added Marcus Luzio for their GB3 squad for selected rounds.

The team entered 2025 without any full-time entry, instead, Hillspeed's 2025 GB3 squad consisted of multiple part-time entries: Freddie Slater, Kanato Le, Hiyu Yamakoshi, Michael Shin, Yuanpu Cui, Lucas Fluxá, Newman Chi and Maxim Rehm.

In 2026, the team signed Dante Vinci, Peter Bouzinelos and Aurelia Nobels.

=== GB4 Championship ===
In 2021, the team was announced to join GB4 Championship and became the first team to commit to participate in the 2022 season.

In 2025, the team returned to GB4 after two-year absent. Hillspeed finished second in the teams' standing.

=== Other series ===
The team won the 2010 Formula Renault BARC season with Alice Powell as well as back-to-back Ginetta Junior championships in 2010 and 2011.

In 2025, the team entered into cooperation with organiser of the AU3 Championship. The team was announced to offer the AU3 Championship winner a fully-funded GB3 multi-day test program.

The team also formerly competed in ARP Formula 3 Championship, later known as MotorSport Vision Formula 3 Cup.

== Current series results ==
=== BRDC Formula 4 Championship / BRDC British Formula 3 Championship / GB3 Championship ===
Year	Car	Drivers	Races	Wins	Poles	F/Laps	Podiums	Points	D.C.	T.C.
2013	Ralph Firman Racing-Duratec MSV F4-013	(United Kingdom) Seb Morris	24	1	0	1	10	410	2nd	N/A
2013	Ralph Firman Racing-Duratec MSV F4-013	(United Kingdom) Struan Moore	24	1	0	0	4	275	9th	N/A
2013	Ralph Firman Racing-Duratec MSV F4-013	(Malaysia) Rahul Raj Mayer	24	0	0	0	0	136	17th	N/A
2014	Ralph Firman Racing-Duratec MSV F4-013	(Malaysia) Rahul Raj Mayer	24	0	0	0	0	223	12th	N/A
2014	Ralph Firman Racing-Duratec MSV F4-013	(Brazil) Gustavo Lima	18	1	0	0	1	194	14th	N/A
2014	Ralph Firman Racing-Duratec MSV F4-013	(Mexico) Alfredo Zabalza	20	0	0	0	0	124	17th	N/A
2015	Ralph Firman Racing-Duratec MSV F4-013	(India) Ameya Vaidyanathan	24	0	0	0	3	217	12th	N/A
2015	Ralph Firman Racing-Duratec MSV F4-013	(Oman) Al Faisal Al Zubair	18	0	0	0	1	189	16th	N/A
2015	Ralph Firman Racing-Duratec MSV F4-013	(Argentina) Hernán Fallas	18	0	0	0	0	103	19th	N/A
2015	Ralph Firman Racing-Duratec MSV F4-013	(South Africa) Sebastian Lanzetti	9	0	0	0	1	89	20th	N/A
2015	Ralph Firman Racing-Duratec MSV F4-013	(United Kingdom) Riki Christodoulou	3	0	0	0	0	0	NC†	N/A
2015 (AT)	Tatuus-Cosworth F4-016	(United Kingdom) Struan Moore	3	0	0	0	1	45	7th	N/A
2015 (AT)	Tatuus-Cosworth F4-016	(India) Ameya Vaidyanathan	4	0	0	0	0	40	8th	N/A
2016	Tatuus-Cosworth F4-016	(Bahrain) Ali Al Khalifa	3	0	0	0	0	5	29th	N/A
2017	Tatuus-Cosworth F4-016	(United States) Chase Owen	24	0	0	1	1	302	7th	N/A
2017	Tatuus-Cosworth F4-016	(Germany) Nick Worm	20	0	0	0	0	159	15th	N/A
2018	Tatuus-Cosworth F4-016	(Thailand) Sasakorn Chaimongkol	23	0	0	0	2	242	9th	N/A
2018	Tatuus-Cosworth F4-016	(Germany) Jusuf Owega	20	0	0	0	0	187	11th	N/A
2018	Tatuus-Cosworth F4-016	(Canada) Ben Hurst	23	0	0	0	1	137	16th	N/A
2019	Tatuus-Cosworth F4-016	(Thailand) Sasakorn Chaimongkol	24	1	0	1	2	314	8th	N/A
2019	Tatuus-Cosworth F4-016	(Argentina) Nicolás Varrone	9	1	0	0	2	109	17th	N/A
2020	Tatuus-Cosworth BF3-020	(Thailand) Sasakorn Chaimongkol	24	0	0	0	1	318	7th	N/A
2020	Tatuus-Cosworth BF3-020	(United Kingdom) Oliver Clarke	24	0	0	0	2	310	8th	N/A
2021	Tatuus-Cosworth BF3-020	(Republic of Ireland) Jonathan Browne	9	0	0	0	1	83	19th	8th
2021	Tatuus-Cosworth BF3-020	(Australia) Flynn Jackes	3	0	0	0	0	6	28th	8th
2022	Tatuus-Cosworth MSV-022	(Canada) Nick Gilkes	23	1	0	0	2	165.5	14th	9th
2023	Tatuus-Cosworth MSV-022	(China) Gerrard Xie	22	1	0	1	1	128	20th	9th
2023	Tatuus-Cosworth MSV-022	(Turkey) Daniel Mavlyutov	23	4	0	0	4	116	22nd	9th
2024	Tatuus-Cosworth MSV-022	(India) Aditya Kulkarni	23	0	0	0	0	111	19th	8th
2024	Tatuus-Cosworth MSV-022	(United Kingdom) Marcus Luzio	6	0	0	0	0	17	30th	8th
2025	Tatuus-Cosworth MSV-025	(Spain) Lucas Fluxá†	24	1	0	0	1	258	8th	4th
2025	Tatuus-Cosworth MSV-025	(United Kingdom) Freddie Slater	9	3	2	4	5	203	12th	4th
2025	Tatuus-Cosworth MSV-025	(Japan) Kanato Le	9	1	1	0	3	145	14th	4th
2025	Tatuus-Cosworth MSV-025	(China) Yuanpu Cui†	15	0	0	0	0	122	18th	4th
2025	Tatuus-Cosworth MSV-025	(Japan) Hiyu Yamakoshi	9	0	0	0	0	121	19th	4th
2025	Tatuus-Cosworth MSV-025	(South Korea) Michael Shin	3	0	0	0	1	40	24th	4th
2025	Tatuus-Cosworth MSV-025	(Germany) Maxim Rehm	3	1	0	0	1	0	NC	4th
2025	Tatuus-Cosworth MSV-025	(China) Newman Chi	3	0	0	0	0	0	NC	4th
2026	Tatuus-Cosworth MSV-2026	(Australia) Dante Vinci	23	0	0	0	0	178	12th	6th
2026	Tatuus-Cosworth MSV-2026	(Australia) Peter Bouzinelos	23	0	0	0	1	147	14th	6th
2026	Tatuus-Cosworth MSV-2026	(Brazil) Aurelia Nobels	23	0	0	1	0	105	18th	6th

† Cui and Fluxá also drove for Argenti with Prema.

=== GB4 Championship ===
Year	Car	Drivers	Races	Wins	Poles	F/Laps	Podiums	Points	D.C.	T.C.
2022	Tatuus F4-T014	(United Kingdom) Max Marzorati	24	0	2	2	10	482	3rd	N/A
2022	Tatuus F4-T014	(Canada) Megan Gilkes	24	2	1	3	3	375	6th	N/A
2022	Tatuus F4-T014	(United Kingdom) Marcus Short	3	0	0	0	0	39	16th	N/A
2022	Tatuus F4-T014	(United Kingdom) Oliver Clarke	3	0	0	0	1	35	17th	N/A
2025	Tatuus MSV GB4-025	(Poland) Daniel Guinchard	21	2	2	3	8	391	3rd	2nd
2025	Tatuus MSV GB4-025	(United States) Leandro Juncos	21	1	0	0	4	269	5th	2nd
2025	Tatuus MSV GB4-025	(United Kingdom) Flame Airikkala†	12	0	0	0	0	34	28th	2nd
2026	Tatuus MSV GB4-025	(Sweden) Enzo Hallman	21	0	0	3	5	341	3rd	2nd
2026	Tatuus MSV GB4-025	(United States) Connor Willis	21	1	0	0	2	221	9th	2nd
2026	Tatuus MSV GB4-025	(United States) Demitri Nolan	21	0	1	0	1	102	17th	2nd

† Airikkala drove for Pace Performance until round 5.
