= 2013 BRDC Formula 4 Championship =

Motor racing competition

Seasons
- ← none 2014 →

The 2013 BRDC Formula 4 Championship was a multi-event motor racing championship for open wheel, formula racing cars held across England. The championship features a mix of professional motor racing teams and privately funded drivers competing in 2 litre Duratec single seat race cars that conform to the technical regulations for the championship. The 2013 season was the inaugural BRDC Formula 4 Championship organized by the British Racing Drivers' Club in the United Kingdom. The season began at Silverstone Circuit on 27 April and ended on 29 September at Donington Park. The series had eight triple header events all held in the United Kingdom.

Jake Hughes became the first drivers' champion after taking four race wins. He finished ahead of HHC Motorsport's driver Charlie Robertson, who won in Brands Hatch and Donington Park. Hillspeed's driver Seb Morris completed the top three in the drivers' standings.

== Teams and drivers ==
2013 Entry List
Team	No.	Driver	Rounds
Douglas Motorsport; Douglas Team E-Lites	2	(Poland) Gosia Rdest	All
Douglas Motorsport; Douglas Team E-Lites	3	(United Kingdom) Sennan Fielding	1–3
Douglas Motorsport; Douglas Team E-Lites	53	(United Kingdom) Matt Bell	6–8
Team KBS	4	(United Kingdom) James Fletcher	2–8
Team KBS	27	(United States) Falco Wauer	1–5
HHC Motorsport	5	(South Africa) Raoul Hyman	All
HHC Motorsport	20	(Brazil) Gustavo Lima	All
HHC Motorsport	55	(United Kingdom) Charlie Robertson	All
Sean Walkinshaw Racing	6	(United Kingdom) Matthew Graham	All
Sean Walkinshaw Racing	23	(China) Zou Sirui	1–3, 5–7
Sean Walkinshaw Racing	66	(United Kingdom) Jack Barlow	All
Lanan Racing	7	(United Kingdom) Jake Hughes	All
Lanan Racing	8	(United Kingdom) Daniel Headlam	All
Lanan Racing	14	(United Kingdom) Jake Dalton	7–8
Chris Dittmann Racing	10	(Republic of Ireland) Dylon Phibbs	2
Chris Dittmann Racing	11	(United Kingdom) Luke Williams	2, 4–5
Chris Dittmann Racing	17	(United Kingdom) Max Cornelius	8
MGR Motorsport	12	(Brazil) Pietro Fittipaldi	1–3, 5–7
MGR Motorsport	13	(Mexico) Diego Menchaca	All
MGR Motorsport	14	(United Kingdom) Jake Dalton	1–6
MGR Motorsport	15	(United Kingdom) Matt Mason	7–8
Frank T Greenway Racing	22	(United Kingdom) James Greenway	All
Hillspeed	25	(United Kingdom) Struan Moore	All
Hillspeed	31	(United Kingdom) Seb Morris	All
Hillspeed	72	(Malaysia) Rahul Raj Mayer	All
Motionsport	32	(United Kingdom) Ross Gunn	1–6
Motionsport	33	(United Kingdom) Ben Gower	4
Motionsport	34	(United Kingdom) Pete Storey	4
Motionsport	77	(United Kingdom) Simon Rudd	1–3
MattRBellRacing Team E-Lites	53	(United Kingdom) Matt Bell	1–5

== Calendar and results ==
The Brands Hatch (18–19 May) and Snetterton (15–16 June) weekends were in support of the Deutsche Tourenwagen Masters and British GT respectively.

Round		Circuit	Date	Pole position	Fastest lap	Winning driver	Winning team
1	R1	Silverstone Circuit (Grand Prix, Northamptonshire)	27 April	(United Kingdom) Jake Hughes	(United Kingdom) Matt Bell	(United Kingdom) Matt Bell	MattRBellRacing Team E-Lites
1	R2	Silverstone Circuit (Grand Prix, Northamptonshire)	28 April		(United Kingdom) Matthew Graham	(United Kingdom) Jack Barlow	Sean Walkinshaw Racing
1	R3	Silverstone Circuit (Grand Prix, Northamptonshire)	28 April		(United Kingdom) Seb Morris	(United Kingdom) Jake Dalton	Mark Godwin Racing
2	R4	Brands Hatch (Indy Circuit, Kent)	18 May	(United Kingdom) Jake Dalton	(United Kingdom) Charlie Robertson	(United Kingdom) Jake Dalton	Mark Godwin Racing
2	R5	Brands Hatch (Indy Circuit, Kent)	19 May		(United Kingdom) Charlie Robertson	(United Kingdom) Matt Bell	MattRBellRacing Team E-Lites
2	R6	Brands Hatch (Indy Circuit, Kent)	19 May		(United Kingdom) Charlie Robertson	(United Kingdom) Charlie Robertson	HHC Motorsport
3	R7	Snetterton Motor Racing Circuit (300 Circuit, Norfolk)	15 June	(United Kingdom) Jake Dalton	(United Kingdom) Charlie Robertson	(United Kingdom) James Fletcher	Team KBS
3	R8	Snetterton Motor Racing Circuit (300 Circuit, Norfolk)	16 June		(United Kingdom) Jake Hughes	(United Kingdom) Struan Moore	Hillspeed
3	R9	Snetterton Motor Racing Circuit (300 Circuit, Norfolk)	16 June		(United Kingdom) Jake Hughes	(United Kingdom) Jake Hughes	Lanan Racing
4	R10	Oulton Park (International Circuit, Cheshire)	6 July	(United Kingdom) Jack Barlow	(United Kingdom) Ross Gunn	(United Kingdom) Jack Barlow	Sean Walkinshaw Racing
4	R11	Oulton Park (International Circuit, Cheshire)	6 July		(United Kingdom) Charlie Robertson	(United Kingdom) Matt Bell	MattRBellRacing Team E-Lites
4	R12	Oulton Park (International Circuit, Cheshire)	6 July		(United Kingdom) Jake Hughes	(United Kingdom) Ross Gunn	Motionsport
5	R13	Brands Hatch (Grand Prix Circuit, Kent)	27 July	(United Kingdom) Jake Hughes	(United Kingdom) Jake Hughes	(Brazil) Pietro Fittipaldi	MGR Motorsport
5	R14	Brands Hatch (Grand Prix Circuit, Kent)	28 July		(United Kingdom) Jake Dalton	(United Kingdom) Matthew Graham	Sean Walkinshaw Racing
5	R15	Brands Hatch (Grand Prix Circuit, Kent)	28 July		(Brazil) Pietro Fittipaldi	(United Kingdom) Jake Hughes	Lanan Racing
6	R16	Silverstone Circuit (Grand Prix, Northamptonshire)	17 August	(United Kingdom) Matthew Graham	(United Kingdom) Jake Hughes	(United Kingdom) Matthew Graham	Sean Walkinshaw Racing
6	R17	Silverstone Circuit (Grand Prix, Northamptonshire)	18 August		(United Kingdom) James Greenway	(United Kingdom) Ross Gunn	Hillspeed
6	R18	Silverstone Circuit (Grand Prix, Northamptonshire)	18 August		(United Kingdom) Jake Hughes	(United Kingdom) Jake Hughes	Lanan Racing
7	R19	Snetterton Motor Racing Circuit (300 Circuit, Norfolk)	7 September	(United Kingdom) Jake Hughes	(United Kingdom) James Fletcher	(United Kingdom) Jake Dalton	Lanan Racing
7	R20	Snetterton Motor Racing Circuit (300 Circuit, Norfolk)	8 September		(United Kingdom) James Fletcher	(United Kingdom) Seb Morris	Sean Walkinshaw Racing
7	R21	Snetterton Motor Racing Circuit (300 Circuit, Norfolk)	8 September		(United Kingdom) James Fletcher	(United Kingdom) James Fletcher	Team KBS
8	R22	Donington Park (Grand Prix Circuit, Leicestershire)	28 September	(United Kingdom) Jake Hughes	(United Kingdom) Charlie Robertson	(United Kingdom) Jake Hughes	Lanan Racing
8	R23	Donington Park (Grand Prix Circuit, Leicestershire)	29 September		(United Kingdom) Charlie Robertson	(United Kingdom) Charlie Robertson	HHC Motorsport
8	R24	Donington Park (Grand Prix Circuit, Leicestershire)	29 September		(United Kingdom) Matt Mason	(United Kingdom) Charlie Robertson	HHC Motorsport

== Standings ==
=== Drivers' championship ===
Place	1	2	3	4	5	6	7	8	9	10	11	12	13	14	15	16	17	18	19	20
Points	30	25	20	18	16	15	14	13	12	11	10	9	8	7	6	5	4	3	2	1

Pos.	Driver	SIL			BRH			SNE			OUL			BRH			SIL			SNE			DON			Points
1	(United Kingdom) Jake Hughes	2	5	Ret	6	4	11	9	6	1	2	6	2	4	4	1	2	9	1	3	2	8	1	6	4	445
2	(United Kingdom) Seb Morris	3	2	2	9	Ret	13	3	4	4	3	4	7	2	6	4	6	7	3	7	1	2	3	8	10	410
3	(United Kingdom) Charlie Robertson	5	7	4	2	3	1	2	5	DSQ	Ret	14	3	3	18	Ret	3	4	5	4	4	5	4	1	1	396
4	(United Kingdom) Matthew Graham	9	6	3	4	7	4	18	DNS	11	6	Ret	6	7	1	3	1	5	2	5	3	6	2	10	7	376
5	(United Kingdom) Jake Dalton	4	3	1	1	5	2	Ret	19	3	7	2	9	6	5	15	Ret	6	13	1	Ret	4	9	5	2	371
6	(United Kingdom) Jack Barlow	6	1	6	10	12	10	16	10	7	1	7	4	5	2	6	4	2	4	8	2	12	13	14	Ret	357
7	(South Africa) Raoul Hyman	Ret	12	11	18	13	3	4	2	DSQ	5	3	5	8	3	10	7	10	6	15	10	15	10	7	5	290
8	(United Kingdom) Matt Bell	1	4	5	8	1	7	7	DNS	Ret	8	1	11	10	Ret	12	9	15	12	Ret	15	7	11	11	8	288
9	(United Kingdom) Struan Moore	7	8	Ret	12	Ret	Ret	8	1	8	15	10	19	11	9	11	11	8	7	2	Ret	3	8	2	9	275
10	(Mexico) Diego Menchaca	8	Ret	9	11	8	9	DSQ	11	10	9	8	17	13	10	2	15	11	9	9	6	10	12	12	12	243
11	(United Kingdom) Ross Gunn	11	13	8	16	10	12	10	8	13	4	5	1	9	7	13	8	1	8							242
12	(United Kingdom) James Greenway	13	16	13	17	11	14	11	12	12	11	11	14	14	11	9	5	3	14	Ret	8	14	5	4	6	238
13	(United Kingdom) James Fletcher				7	2	5	1	7	2	Ret	18	8	12	13	5	Ret	DNS	DNS	14	9	1	6	Ret	Ret	237
14	(Brazil) Gustavo Lima	Ret	Ret	10	14	9	8	Ret	9	5	10	9	10	16	17	7	Ret	13	11	6	5	9	7	3	11	233
15	(Brazil) Pietro Fittipaldi	10	9	Ret	13	Ret	Ret	DSQ	13	9				1	8	14	10	12	10	10	7	13				165
16	(United States) Falco Wauer	19	10	Ret	3	6	6	5	3	6	Ret	17	13	15	12	Ret										141
17	(Malaysia) Rahul Raj Mayer	14	18	15	23	17	19	12	15	14	12	13	18	20	19	Ret	13	14	13	13	11	16	14	13	13	136
18	(Poland) Gosia Rdest	16	17	12	20	14	16	15	18	15	14	15	16	19	15	17	14	18	Ret	11	13	Ret	16	15	15	121
19	(United Kingdom) Daniel Headlam	18	15	Ret	19	15	Ret	14	16	17	13	12	15	18	16	16	12	16	Ret	12	14	17	17	17	16	116
20	(United Kingdom) Sennan Fielding	12	11	7	5	Ret	Ret	6	DNS	DNS																64
21	(United Kingdom) Matt Mason																			DSQ	Ret	10	NC	9	3	42
22	(United Kingdom) Luke Williams				15	Ret	15				Ret	19	12	17	20	8										41
23	(United Kingdom) Simon Rudd	17	Ret	14	22	18	18	13	17	16																34
24	(United Kingdom) Max Cornelius																						15	16	14	18
25	(United Kingdom) Pete Storey										16	16	20													11
26	(Republic of Ireland) Dylon Phibbs				21	16	20																			6
	(United Kingdom) Ben Gower										DNS	DNS	DNS													0
drivers ineligible for championship points
	(China) Zou Sirui	15	14	Ret	Ret	19	17	17	14	Ret				Ret	14	Ret	DSQ	17	16	Ret	12	18				0
Pos.	Driver	SIL			BRH			SNE			OUL			BRH			SIL			SNE			DON			Points

=== "Who zooms" award ===
This award was for the driver who made the most passes over the season.

Pos.	Driver	SIL			BRH			SNE			OUL			BRH			SIL			SNE			DON			Points
1	(Poland) Gosia Rdest	3	0	7	4	6	5	5	0	6	5	0	3	2	4	4	5	0	0	7	0	0	2	1	3	72
2	(Brazil) Gustavo Lima	0	0	11	1	5	0	0	10	3	2	1	0	1	0	2	0	6	0	7	0	3	3	0	5	60
3	(United Kingdom) James Greenway	2	0	0	1	6	3	3	0	4	5	0	2	0	3	5	8	1	0	0	7	0	0	0	0	50
4	(Mexico) Diego Menchaca	0	0	7	0	3	9	0	10	2	0	1	0	3	3	1	0	4	1	0	2	1	1	0	2	50
5	(South Africa) Raoul Hyman	0	9	0	0	5	0	4	3	0	0	1	0	0	0	2	1	0	1	0	4	0	4	3	7	44
6	(Malaysia) Rahul Raj Mayer	3	0	3	0	6	1	4	0	4	6	0	0	0	1	0	4	0	2	2	1	0	1	1	2	41
7	(United Kingdom) Daniel Headlam	0	3	0	2	4	0	7	0	0	4	1	3	0	2	3	6	0	0	4	0	0	0	0	1	40
8	(China) Zou Sirui	5	1	0	0	5	7	2	3	0				0	7	0	0	1	1	0	5	1				38
9	(United Kingdom) Jake Hughes	0	2	0	0	0	0	13	3	3	1	1	2	0	1	0	0	0	0	0	3	0	0	2	7	38
10	(United Kingdom) Seb Morris	4	4	1	4	0	3	3	2	1	1	1	0	4	1	3	1	0	1	0	1	2	1	0	0	38
11	(United Kingdom) Struan Moore	0	0	0	4	0	0	9	0	0	0	5	0	0	2	5	3	3	4	1	0	0	1	0	0	37
12	(Brazil) Pietro Fittipaldi	11	1	0	0	0	0	0	9	5				1	0	0	2	0	2	2	2	1				36
13	(United Kingdom) Jake Dalton	0	2	1	0	3	2	0	1	3	4	0	0	2	0	0	0	11	0	1	0	0	0	4	0	34
14	(United Kingdom) Ross Gunn	2	0	4	1	6	1	8	2	2	2	0	1	0	1	0	3	0	0							33
15	(United Kingdom) Jack Barlow	0	2	0	0	0	5	0	6	6	0	1	0	2	2	4	0	3	1	0	0	0	0	0	0	32
16	(United Kingdom) Charlie Robertson	3	0	1	0	4	0	3	2	0	0	6	0	0	0	0	0	2	0	0	1	2	2	4	0	30
17	(United Kingdom) Matthew Graham	0	3	0	2	0	0	0	0	0	2	0	2	3	1	1	0	3	0	3	1	2	0	0	0	23
18	(United Kingdom) Matt Bell	2	4	1	0	0	5	0	0	0	2	0	0	0	0	1	0	0	2	0	1	3	0	0	1	22
19	(United States) Falco Wauer	0	9	0	0	0	3	0	1	4	0	0	2	0	3	0										22
20	(United Kingdom) James Fletcher				0	0	1	1	1	1	0	1	0	2	0	3	0		0	5	4	0	2	0	0	21
21	(United Kingdom) Simon Rudd	1	0	6	1	4	4	2	0	3																21
22	(United Kingdom) Sennan Fielding	0	1	7	0	0	0	4	0	0																12
23	(United Kingdom) Luke Williams				0	0	0				0	0	1	0	0	7										8
24	(Republic of Ireland) Dylon Phibbs				0	5	0																			5
25	(United Kingdom) Pete Storey										5	0	0													5
26	(United Kingdom) Max Cornelius																						1	0	0	1
27	(United Kingdom) Ben Gower										0	0	0													0
Pos.	Driver	SIL			BRH			SNE			OUL			BRH			SIL			SNE			DON			Points
