= British Formula Three Championship =

British Formula Three Championship may refer to:

- British Formula 3 International Series, a class of auto racing for Formula 3 open wheeled single seater racing cars, which took place from 1951 to 2014
- BRDC British Formula 3 Championship, a one-make class of auto racing for Formula 3 open wheeled single seater racing cars established in 2016
