= 2014 BRDC Formula 4 Championship =

Multi-event motor racing championship

Seasons
- ← 2013 2015 →

The 2014 BRDC Formula 4 Championship was a multi-event motor racing championship for open wheel, formula racing cars held across England. The championship featured a mix of professional motor racing teams and privately funded drivers competing in 2 litre Duratec single seat race cars that conformed to the technical regulations for the championship. The 2014 season was the second BRDC Formula 4 Championship organized by Jonathan Palmer's MotorSport Vision company, with support from the British Racing Drivers' Club in the United Kingdom, and dedicated championship highlights shown on ITV4 the weekend after each round, in a prime time slot. The season began at Silverstone on 26 April and ended on 26 October at Snetterton, after 8 triple header events amassing to 24 races.

Heading into the final round of the championship, six drivers were in mathematical contention to win the championship. Lanan Racing team-mates Arjun Maini and George Russell led the standings, with Maini 21 points clear of Russell. HHC Motorsport duo Sennan Fielding and Raoul Hyman were split by five points for third and fourth places, with Struan Moore (Lanan Racing) and Will Palmer (HHC Motorsport) requiring results to go in their favour, despite being in the running. Russell took pole position for the opening race, but Fielding was the highest placed at the end, in third place; Russell cut Maini's lead slightly with a seventh, while Palmer and Moore could no longer win the title due to their results. Maini took pole for the second race, due to his eighth place and the regulations for the partially reversed grid order stipulating such. Maini led from the start, before Hyman and Russell passed him early in the race. Maini fell to fifth as he made an error later in the race, dropping him behind Fielding and Moore. Hyman held the lead until the end which meant that four drivers could still win the title in the final race.

Maini held a 13-point lead over Russell, with Fielding 5 points further adrift, and Hyman the outsider, 25 points adrift of Maini. Russell started from pole position, with Hyman, Fielding and Maini behind. Hyman made the best start to take the lead from Russell at the start, but Russell regained the lead the following lap, and ultimately went on to win the race; a season-high fifth victory. With Maini down in fifth place, it enabled Russell to clinch the title by just three points. With the championship, he received a prize test with the Arden Motorsport GP3 team at the Yas Marina Circuit in Abu Dhabi at the end of the season, as well as a £25,000 cash prize. Behind Maini, Hyman's second place finish allowed him to jump Fielding for third place in the championship, by a single point. All three drivers won four races over the course of the season, including a hat-trick for Fielding at Silverstone, a first for the series. Other drivers to win races were Moore at Oulton Park, Palmer won twice at the first Snetterton meeting, as well as single victories for Diego Menchaca (Snetterton), and Brands Hatch victories for Gustavo Lima, Gaetano di Mauro and Chris Middlehurst.

== Teams and drivers ==
2014 Entry List
Team	No.	Driver	Rounds
(United Kingdom) Douglas Motorsport	2	(Republic of Ireland) Charlie Eastwood	All
(United Kingdom) Douglas Motorsport	26	(Mexico) Rodrigo Fonseca	All
(United Kingdom) Douglas Motorsport	68	(Mexico) Diego Menchaca	All
(United Kingdom) HHC Motorsport	3	(United Kingdom) Will Palmer	All
(United Kingdom) HHC Motorsport	4	(United Kingdom) Sennan Fielding	All
(United Kingdom) HHC Motorsport	7	(South Africa) Raoul Hyman	All
(United Kingdom) Hillspeed	5	(Brazil) Gustavo Lima	1–6
(United Kingdom) Hillspeed	12	(Mexico) Alfredo Zabalza	1–2, 4–8
(United Kingdom) Hillspeed	72	(Malaysia) Rahul Raj Mayer	All
(United Kingdom) Lanan Racing	8	(United Kingdom) George Russell	All
(United Kingdom) Lanan Racing	9	(United Kingdom) Struan Moore	All
(United Kingdom) Lanan Racing	36	(India) Arjun Maini	All
(United Kingdom) Chris Dittmann Racing	10	(United Kingdom) Tom Jackson	1–6
(United Kingdom) Chris Dittmann Racing	11	(United Kingdom) Tom Bale	4–8
(United Kingdom) Chris Dittmann Racing	17	(United Kingdom) Piers Hickin	8
(United Kingdom) Mark Godwin Racing	13	(Netherlands) Michael Claessens	All
(United Kingdom) Mark Godwin Racing	16	(United Kingdom) Chris Middlehurst	1–6
(United Kingdom) Mark Godwin Racing	43	(United Kingdom) David Wagner	1–3
(Brazil) Petroball Racing	21	(Brazil) Gaetano di Mauro	All
(Brazil) Petroball Racing	61	(United States) Dan Roeper	1–3
(United Kingdom) / Sean Walkinshaw Racing; (United Kingdom) / SWR – Caterham F1	22	(Spain) Álex Palou	5
(United Kingdom) / Sean Walkinshaw Racing; (United Kingdom) / SWR – Caterham F1	23	(United Kingdom) Jordan Albert	All
(United Kingdom) / Sean Walkinshaw Racing; (United Kingdom) / SWR – Caterham F1	27	(Denmark) Nicolas Beer	1–4
(United Kingdom) / Sean Walkinshaw Racing; (United Kingdom) / SWR – Caterham F1	41	(Venezuela) Diego Borrelli	All
(United Kingdom) Meridian Racing	35	(United Kingdom) Connor Jupp	5–8
(United Kingdom) Meridian Racing	42	(United Kingdom) Jai Nijjar	5–7
(United Kingdom) Meridian Racing	77	(India) Gurazeez Sachdeva	5–7
(United Kingdom) Enigma Motorsport	51	(Norway) Falco Wauer	1–2

== Race calendar and results ==
The first Brands Hatch race weekend was held in support of the Blancpain Sprint Series. Later in the season, at the first Snetterton meeting and the second Brands Hatch meeting, the series formed part of the support package to British GT Championship rounds.

Round		Circuit	Date	Pole position	Fastest lap	Winning driver	Winning team
1	R1	Silverstone Circuit (Grand Prix, Northamptonshire)	26 April	(South Africa) Raoul Hyman	(United Kingdom) Sennan Fielding	(South Africa) Raoul Hyman	(United Kingdom) HHC Motorsport
1	R2	Silverstone Circuit (Grand Prix, Northamptonshire)	27 April		(United Kingdom) Will Palmer	(United Kingdom) George Russell	(United Kingdom) Lanan Racing
1	R3	Silverstone Circuit (Grand Prix, Northamptonshire)	27 April		(United Kingdom) George Russell	(United Kingdom) George Russell	(United Kingdom) Lanan Racing
2	R4	Brands Hatch (Grand Prix Circuit, Kent)	17 May	(South Africa) Raoul Hyman	(India) Arjun Maini	(South Africa) Raoul Hyman	(United Kingdom) HHC Motorsport
2	R5	Brands Hatch (Grand Prix Circuit, Kent)	18 May		(United Kingdom) Sennan Fielding	(Brazil) Gustavo Lima	(United Kingdom) Hillspeed
2	R6	Brands Hatch (Grand Prix Circuit, Kent)	18 May		(United Kingdom) Sennan Fielding	(United Kingdom) George Russell	(United Kingdom) Lanan Racing
3	R7	Snetterton Motor Racing Circuit (300 Circuit, Norfolk)	21 June	(United Kingdom) George Russell	(United Kingdom) Will Palmer	(United Kingdom) Will Palmer	(United Kingdom) HHC Motorsport
3	R8	Snetterton Motor Racing Circuit (300 Circuit, Norfolk)	22 June		(India) Arjun Maini	(India) Arjun Maini	(United Kingdom) Lanan Racing
3	R9	Snetterton Motor Racing Circuit (300 Circuit, Norfolk)	22 June		(India) Arjun Maini	(United Kingdom) Will Palmer	(United Kingdom) HHC Motorsport
4	R10	Oulton Park (International Circuit, Cheshire)	18 July	(United Kingdom) George Russell	(United Kingdom) Struan Moore	(United Kingdom) George Russell	(United Kingdom) Lanan Racing
4	R11	Oulton Park (International Circuit, Cheshire)	19 July		(India) Arjun Maini	(India) Arjun Maini	(United Kingdom) Lanan Racing
4	R12	Oulton Park (International Circuit, Cheshire)	19 July		(United Kingdom) Chris Middlehurst	(United Kingdom) Struan Moore	(United Kingdom) Lanan Racing
5	R13	Silverstone Circuit (Grand Prix, Northamptonshire)	16 August	(United Kingdom) Sennan Fielding	(United Kingdom) Sennan Fielding	(United Kingdom) Sennan Fielding	(United Kingdom) HHC Motorsport
5	R14	Silverstone Circuit (Grand Prix, Northamptonshire)	17 August		(United Kingdom) Will Palmer	(United Kingdom) Sennan Fielding	(United Kingdom) HHC Motorsport
5	R15	Silverstone Circuit (Grand Prix, Northamptonshire)	17 August		(South Africa) Raoul Hyman	(United Kingdom) Sennan Fielding	(United Kingdom) HHC Motorsport
6	R16	Brands Hatch (Grand Prix Circuit, Kent)	30 August	(Brazil) Gaetano di Mauro	(India) Arjun Maini	(Brazil) Gaetano di Mauro	(Brazil) Petroball Racing
6	R17	Brands Hatch (Grand Prix Circuit, Kent)	31 August		(India) Arjun Maini	(United Kingdom) Chris Middlehurst	(United Kingdom) Mark Godwin Racing
6	R18	Brands Hatch (Grand Prix Circuit, Kent)	31 August		(United Kingdom) George Russell	(India) Arjun Maini	(United Kingdom) Lanan Racing
7	R19	Donington Park (Grand Prix Circuit, Leicestershire)	20 September	(United Kingdom) Sennan Fielding	(United Kingdom) George Russell	(United Kingdom) Sennan Fielding	(United Kingdom) HHC Motorsport
7	R20	Donington Park (Grand Prix Circuit, Leicestershire)	21 September		(South Africa) Raoul Hyman	(South Africa) Raoul Hyman	(United Kingdom) HHC Motorsport
7	R21	Donington Park (Grand Prix Circuit, Leicestershire)	21 September		(United Kingdom) Sennan Fielding	(India) Arjun Maini	(United Kingdom) Lanan Racing
8	R22	Snetterton Motor Racing Circuit (300 Circuit, Norfolk)	25 October	(United Kingdom) George Russell	(United Kingdom) George Russell	(Mexico) Diego Menchaca	(United Kingdom) Douglas Motorsport
8	R23	Snetterton Motor Racing Circuit (300 Circuit, Norfolk)	26 October		(United Kingdom) George Russell	(South Africa) Raoul Hyman	(United Kingdom) HHC Motorsport
8	R24	Snetterton Motor Racing Circuit (300 Circuit, Norfolk)	26 October		(South Africa) Raoul Hyman	(United Kingdom) George Russell	(United Kingdom) Lanan Racing

== Championship standings ==
Scoring system

Points were awarded to the top 20 classified finishers in all races.

Races	Position, points per race																			
Races	1st	2nd	3rd	4th	5th	6th	7th	8th	9th	10th	11th	12th	13th	14th	15th	16th	17th	18th	19th	20th
Races 1 & 3	35	29	24	21	19	17	15	13	12	11	10	9	8	7	6	5	4	3	2	1
Race 2	25	22	20	18	16	15	14	13	12	11	10	9	8	7	6	5	4	3	2	1

=== Drivers' championship ===
Pos.	Driver	SIL			BRH			SNE			OUL			SIL			BRH			DON			SNE			Points
1	(United Kingdom) George Russell	5	1	1	4	3	1	**3**	3	6	**1**	6	Ret	5	6	6	10	3	5	2	6	Ret	**7**	2	1	483
2	(India) Arjun Maini	8	11	2	2	4	4	8	1	4	7	1	Ret	3	8	4	3	2	1	4	4	1	8	5	5	480
3	(South Africa) Raoul Hyman	**1**	4	10	**1**	10	3	2	13	3	2	2	Ret	6	7	2	4	4	12	7	1	Ret	6	1	2	465
4	(United Kingdom) Sennan Fielding	3	10	DSQ	5	5	2	4	NC	2	5	17	4	**1**	1	1	6	9	4	**1**	7	9	3	3	4	464
5	(United Kingdom) Struan Moore	Ret	3	5	6	7	Ret	9	6	7	4	4	1	2	Ret	3	2	6	3	3	5	10	5	4	6	412
6	(United Kingdom) Will Palmer	7	6	6	3	6	8	1	5	1	6	3	3	Ret	3	7	8	7	Ret	5	2	Ret	Ret	17	18	356
7	(Mexico) Diego Menchaca	2	8	3	Ret	8	11	7	2	8	10	9	Ret	7	DSQ	10	16	11	13	6	3	2	1	18	9	327
8	(Brazil) Gaetano di Mauro	12	Ret	12	11	16	9	14	9	5	12	11	6	11	2	9	**1**	Ret	2	10	9	DNS	4	6	7	301
9	(United Kingdom) Chris Middlehurst	Ret	7	4	7	2	5	10	Ret	15	3	5	2	10	DSQ	8	7	1	9							253
10	(Republic of Ireland) Charlie Eastwood	18	Ret	7	14	13	10	15	14	9	18	12	Ret	12	11	Ret	12	Ret	8	8	10	4	2	8	3	233
11	(United Kingdom) Jordan Albert	13	13	13	DNS	18	6	18	8	16	15	13	7	14	14	13	5	5	7	9	11	3	Ret	15	13	226
12	(Malaysia) Rahul Raj Mayer	9	14	11	10	11	14	11	7	12	16	10	Ret	8	9	11	11	Ret	11	Ret	12	6	10	7	10	223
13	(Mexico) Rodrigo Fonseca	11	16	8	9	9	12	13	DSQ	14	20	14	Ret	15	4	12	Ret	16	6	11	8	5	Ret	11	12	200
14	(Brazil) Gustavo Lima	6	5	9	8	1	18	6	4	10	9	7	Ret	13	Ret	14	9	12	Ret							194
15	(United Kingdom) Tom Jackson	Ret	12	19	12	19	16	16	11	13	8	Ret	5	Ret	5	15	13	8	10							136
16	(Venezuela) Diego Borrelli	14	Ret	17	16	12	7	17	15	Ret	19	Ret	8	16	10	21	14	Ret	14	13	18	13	Ret	14	14	128
17	(Mexico) Alfredo Zabalza	Ret	Ret	16	15	15	DNS				13	Ret	Ret	9	15	18	15	10	16	12	14	8	11	10	15	124
18	(Netherlands) Michael Claessens	17	17	18	Ret	20	DNS	Ret	12	18	14	15	9	18	16	19	19	Ret	19	16	15	14	12	16	16	100
19	(United Kingdom) Connor Jupp													Ret	12	17	17	13	17	14	13	7	9	9	11	93
20	(Denmark) Nicolas Beer	4	2	Ret	Ret	21	DNS	5	Ret	19	11	8	Ret													87
21	(United Kingdom) Tom Bale										17	16	Ret	17	18	16	18	14	15	15	17	11	Ret	13	17	69
22	(United Kingdom) David Wagner	10	9	15	13	Ret	13	12	Ret	11																64
23	(Spain) Álex Palou													4	13	5										48
24	(United States) Dan Roeper	16	15	14	DNS	17	17	Ret	10	17																41
25	(United Kingdom) Jai Nijjar													19	17	20	20	15	18	17	16	12				35
26	(United Kingdom) Piers Hickin																						Ret	12	8	22
27	(Norway) Falco Wauer	15	Ret	20	Ret	14	15																			20
Pos.	Driver	SIL			BRH			SNE			OUL			SIL			BRH			DON			SNE			Points

Colour	Result
Gold	Winner
Silver	Second place
Bronze	Third place
Green	Points classification
Blue	Non-points classification
Blue	Non-classified finish (NC)
Purple	Retired, not classified (Ret)
Red	Did not qualify (DNQ)
Red	Did not pre-qualify (DNPQ)
Black	Disqualified (DSQ)
White	Did not start (DNS)
White	Withdrew (WD)
White	Race cancelled (C)
Blank	Did not practice (DNP)
Blank	Did not arrive (DNA)
Blank	Excluded (EX)

**Bold** – Pole
Italics – Fastest Lap

=== Jack Cavill Pole Position Cup ===
The Jack Cavill Pole Position Cup was awarded to the driver who started from pole position most often throughout the season. Champion George Russell won the trophy, on a tie-break with Arjun Maini, as Russell took more pole positions from qualifying sessions.

Pos.	Driver	Poles
1	(United Kingdom) George Russell	5
2	(India) Arjun Maini	5
3	(United Kingdom) Sennan Fielding	4
4	(South Africa) Raoul Hyman	2
4	(United Kingdom) Will Palmer	2
6	(Brazil) Gaetano di Mauro	1
6	(Republic of Ireland) Charlie Eastwood	1
6	(United Kingdom) Tom Jackson	1
6	(Brazil) Gustavo Lima	1
6	(Malaysia) Rahul Raj Mayer	1
6	(United Kingdom) Struan Moore	1
