= Diego Menchaca =

Mexican racing driver

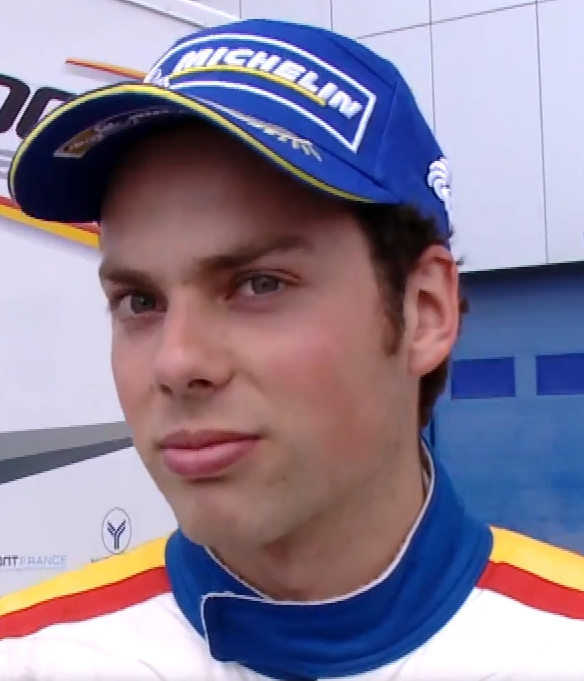
- Menchaca in April 2015
- Nationality: (Mexico) Mexican
- Born: 20 October 1994 (age 32) Mexico City, Mexico

European Le Mans Series career
- Debut season: 2021
- Current team: Algarve Pro Racing
- Categorisation: FIA Silver
- Car number: 24
- Starts: 5
- Wins: 0
- Poles: 0
- Fastest laps: 0

Previous series
- 2016 2014 2012-13 2011: Euroformula Open Championship; BRDC Formula 4 British Formula Renault; LATAM Challenge Series

Diego Menchaca González-Quintanilla (born 20 October 1994 in Mexico City) is a Mexican racing driver and manager.

== Career ==
=== Karting ===
Menchaca began karting in 2006 at the age of eight, competing in championships across Mexico and the United States.

=== Lower Formulae ===
In 2011, Menchaca graduated to single-seaters in the LATAM Challenge Series. There he took a pole position at the round in Houston and finished fourth in the overall standings.

For the next two years, Menchaca raced with Fortec Motorsports and Jamun Racing Services in the British Formula Renault Championship, where he finished eleventh in 2012 and eighteenth the following year.

In 2014, Menchaca switched to BRDC Formula 4 with Douglas Motorsport. He claimed a victory in the third race at Donington Park and finished seventh in the overall standings.

In 2015, Menchaca joined Campos Racing for the Euroformula Open Championship, where he finished eighth in the Euroformula standings and sixth in the Spanish F3 standings. He remained with Campos for the following season, finishing fourth and fifth in the respective championship standings.

=== Formula V8 3.5 ===
In December 2016, Menchaca partook in the post-season collective Test with Teo Martín Motorsport.

== Manager ==
From 2025, Menchaca focused on driver management. In the same year, he became manager of Yuki Tsunoda and Leonardo Fornaroli.

== Racing record ==
=== Career summary ===
| Season | Series | Team | Races | Wins | Poles | F/Laps | Podiums | Points | Position |
|---|---|---|---|---|---|---|---|---|---|
| 2011 | LATAM Challenge Series | Re Racing | 15 | 0 | 1 | 0 | 3 | 132 | 4th |
| 2012 | Formula Renault BARC | Fortec Motorsports | 14 | 0 | 0 | 0 | 0 | 130 | 11th |
| 2013 | BRDC Formula 4 Championship | MGR Motorsport | 24 | 0 | 0 | 0 | 1 | 243 | 10th |
| 2013 | Protyre Formula Renault Championship | Jamun Racing Services | 11 | 0 | 0 | 0 | 0 | 78 | 18th |
| 2014 | BRDC Formula 4 Championship | Douglas Motorsport | 24 | 1 | 0 | 0 | 6 | 327 | 7th |
| 2015 | Euroformula Open Championship | Campos Racing | 16 | 0 | 0 | 0 | 1 | 94 | 8th |
| 2015 | Spanish Formula 3 Championship | Campos Racing | 6 | 0 | 0 | 0 | 1 | 42 | 6th |
| 2016 | Euroformula Open Championship | Campos Racing | 16 | 0 | 0 | 1 | 4 | 145 | 4th |
| 2016 | Spanish Formula 3 Championship | Campos Racing | 6 | 0 | 0 | 0 | 1 | 57 | 5th |
| 2017 | World Series Formula V8 3.5 | Fortec Motorsports | 17 | 0 | 0 | 0 | 1 | 94 | 9th |
| 2018 | GP3 Series | Campos Racing | 18 | 0 | 0 | 0 | 0 | 3 | 19th |
| 2019 | Blancpain GT World Challenge Europe | Orange1 FFF Racing Team | 9 | 0 | 0 | 0 | 0 | 0.5 | 24th |
| 2019 | Blancpain GT World Challenge Europe - Silver Cup | Orange1 FFF Racing Team | 9 | 0 | 0 | 1 | 0 | 42 | 8th |
| 2019 | Blancpain GT Series Endurance Cup | Orange1 FFF Racing Team | 4 | 0 | 0 | 0 | 0 | 1 | 34th |
| 2019 | Blancpain GT Series Endurance Cup - Silver Cup | Orange1 FFF Racing Team | 4 | 0 | 0 | 1 | 1 | 28 | 12th |
| 2021 | European Le Mans Series - LMP2 | Algarve Pro Racing | 5 | 0 | 0 | 0 | 0 | 12.5 | 22nd |
| 2022 | GT World Challenge Europe Endurance Cup | Belgian Audi Club Team WRT | 5 | 0 | 0 | 0 | 0 | 0 | NC |
| 2022-23 | Middle East Trophy - GT3 | MS7 by Team WRT | | | | | | | |
| 2023 | International GT Open | Team Motopark | 13 | 1 | 0 | 2 | 7 | 111 | **3rd** |
| 2024 | International GT Open | Team Motopark | 14 | 0 | 0 | 1 | 5 | 81 | 8th |

^{*} Season still in progress.

=== Complete World Series Formula V8 3.5 results ===
(key) (Races in bold indicate pole position; races in italics indicate fastest lap)

| Year | Team | 1 | 2 | 3 | 4 | 5 | 6 | 7 | 8 | 9 | 10 | 11 | 12 | 13 | 14 | 15 | 16 | 17 | 18 | Pos | Points |
|---|---|---|---|---|---|---|---|---|---|---|---|---|---|---|---|---|---|---|---|---|---|
| 2017 | Fortec Motorsports | SIL; 1; 9 | SIL; 2; 7 | SPA; 1; 4 | SPA; 2; 5 | MNZ; 1; 7 | MNZ; 2 DNS | JER; 1; 9 | JER; 2; 9 | ALC; 1; 9 | ALC; 2; 7 | NÜR; 1; 8 | NÜR; 2; 10 | MEX; 1; 8 | MEX; 2; 5 | COA; 1; 9 | COA; 2; 3 | BHR; 1; 8 | BHR; 2; 7 | 9th | 94 |

=== Complete GP3 Series results ===
(key) (Races in bold indicate pole position) (Races in italics indicate fastest lap)

| Year | Entrant | 1 | 2 | 3 | 4 | 5 | 6 | 7 | 8 | 9 | 10 | 11 | 12 | 13 | 14 | 15 | 16 | 17 | 18 | Pos | Points |
|---|---|---|---|---|---|---|---|---|---|---|---|---|---|---|---|---|---|---|---|---|---|
| 2018 | Campos Racing | CAT; FEA; 10 | CAT; SPR; 12 | LEC; FEA; 14 | LEC; SPR; Ret | RBR; FEA; 14 | RBR; SPR; 16 | SIL; FEA; 12 | SIL; SPR; 11 | HUN; FEA; 9 | HUN; SPR; 10 | SPA; FEA; 19 | SPA; SPR; 16 | MNZ; FEA; Ret | MNZ; SPR; 14 | SOC; FEA; Ret | SOC; SPR; 15 | YMC; FEA; 18 | YMC; SPR; 16 | 19th | 3 |

=== Complete GT World Challenge Europe results ===
==== GT World Challenge Europe Endurance Cup ====
(key) (Races in bold indicate pole position) (Races in italics indicate fastest lap)

| Year | Team | Car | Class | 1 | 2 | 3 | 4 | 5 | 6 | 7 | Pos. | Points |
|---|---|---|---|---|---|---|---|---|---|---|---|---|
| 2019 | Orange 1 FFF Racing Team | Lamborghini Huracán GT3 Evo | Silver | MNZ; 10 | SIL; Ret | LEC; 17 | SPA; 6H; 61 | SPA; 12H; 52 | SPA; 24H; Ret | CAT | 12th | 28 |
| 2022 | Team WRT | Audi R8 LMS Evo II | Silver | IMO; 27 | LEC; 14 | SPA; 6H; 59 | SPA; 12H; 49 | SPA; 24H; 39 | HOC; 37 | CAT; Ret | 14th | 24 |

==== GT World Challenge Europe Sprint Cup ====
(key) (Races in bold indicate pole position) (Races in italics indicate fastest lap)

| Year | Team | Car | Class | 1 | 2 | 3 | 4 | 5 | 6 | 7 | 8 | 9 | 10 | Pos. | Points |
|---|---|---|---|---|---|---|---|---|---|---|---|---|---|---|---|
| 2019 | Orange1 FFF Racing Team | Lamborghini Huracán GT3 | Silver | BRH; 1; 19 | BRH; 2 DNS | MIS; 1; 23 | MIS; 2; 10 | ZAN; 1; 22 | ZAN; 2; 16 | NÜR; 1; 22 | NÜR; 2; 16 | HUN; 1; 24 | HUN; 2; 23 | 8th | 42 |

=== Complete European Le Mans Series results ===
(key) (Races in bold indicate pole position; results in italics indicate fastest lap)

| Year | Entrant | Class | Chassis | Engine | 1 | 2 | 3 | 4 | 5 | 6 | Rank | Points |
|---|---|---|---|---|---|---|---|---|---|---|---|---|
| 2021 | Algarve Pro Racing | LMP2 | Oreca 07 | Gibson GK428 4.2 L V8 | CAT; 11 | RBR; 8 | LEC; 7 | MNZ; 10 | SPA; Ret | ALG | 22nd | 12.5 |

=== Complete International GT Open results ===
| Year | Team | Car | Class | 1 | 2 | 3 | 4 | 5 | 6 | 7 | 8 | 9 | 10 | 11 | 12 | 13 | 14 | Pos. | Points |
|---|---|---|---|---|---|---|---|---|---|---|---|---|---|---|---|---|---|---|---|
| 2023 | Team Motopark | Mercedes-AMG GT3 Evo | Pro | PRT; 1; 3 | PRT; 2; 1 | SPA; 3 | HUN; 1; 5 | HUN; 2; 2 | LEC; 1; 2 | LEC; 2; 3 | RBR; 1; 2 | RBR; 2; 11 | MNZ; 1; 9 | MNZ; 2; 7 | CAT; 1; 13 | CAT; 2; 4 | | 2nd | 109 |
| 2024 | Team Motopark | Mercedes-AMG GT3 Evo | Pro | PRT; 1 Ret | PRT; 2; 3 | HOC; 1; 2 | HOC; 2; 2 | **SPA**; 6 | HUN; 1; 3 | HUN; 2; 11 | LEC; 1; 3 | LEC; 2 Ret | RBR; 1; 7 | RBR; 2 Ret | CAT; 1; 7 | CAT; 2; 6 | MNZ; 9 | 8th | 81 |

^{*}Season still in progress.
