= 2014 Italian F4 Championship =

Motorsport season

The 2014 Italian F4 Championship was the inaugural season of the Italian F4 Championship, as it replaces Formula Abarth. It began on 8 June in Adria and finished on 12 October in Imola after seven triple header rounds.

The championship was won by Canadian driver Lance Stroll, a member of the Ferrari Driver Academy, taking 7 overall victories and 3 further class victories from 18 races contested – he missed the final round at Imola due to injury. Stroll, driving for Prema Powerteam, finished 94 points clear of his closest championship rival, Mattia Drudi of the F & M team. Drudi won four races overall, including a hat-trick at Monza, as well as a class victory in the final race of the season. Third in the championship went to Diegi Motorsport driver Andrea Russo, taking an overall victory at Adria, as well as a class victory at Mugello. Euronova Racing by Fortec's Ukyo Sasahara, and his replacement, Andrea Fontana were the only other eligible drivers to take an overall victory, with wins at Adria and Magione respectively. Fontana also achieved a class victory at Imola, while the third Imola class win was taken by SMP Racing by Euronova and Ivan Matveev. Prema Powerteam won the teams' championship, 58 points clear of Euronova Racing by Fortec.

In the concurrent Italian F4 Trophy for drivers over the age of 18, the championship was dominated by Prema Powerteam's Brandon Maïsano. Maïsano won the first 10 races of the season, and ultimately finished the season with 17 class wins and 19 podiums from the 21 races. Maïsano also achieved six overall victories during the season, but was ineligible to score points towards the main championship. He finished 176 points clear of his next closest rival, Ali Al-Khalifa, who took a single class win at Magione. Keith Camilleri finished third in class with nine second place finishes, while Sennan Fielding was the only other driver to take part in the class; he achieved three class wins, including an overall win at Imola, from his six starts.

== Teams and drivers ==
Team	No.	Driver	Class	Rounds
(Russia) SMP Racing by Euronova	2	(Russia) Ivan Matveev		All
(Italy) Euronova Racing by Fortec	3	(Japan) Ukyo Sasahara		1
(Italy) Euronova Racing by Fortec	3	(Italy) Andrea Fontana		2–7
(Italy) Euronova Racing by Fortec	4	(Italy) Leonardo Pulcini		1–5
(Italy) Euronova Racing by Fortec	5	(Japan) Shinji Sawada		7
(Italy) Euronova Racing by Fortec	85	(United Kingdom) Sennan Fielding	T	6–7
(Italy) DAV Racing	4	(Italy) Leonardo Pulcini		6–7
(Italy) DAV Racing	24	(Brazil) Gustavo Bandeira		1–4
(Switzerland) Jenzer Motorsport	7	(Switzerland) Alain Valente		All
(Switzerland) Jenzer Motorsport	8	(Switzerland) Lucas Mauron		All
(Switzerland) Jenzer Motorsport	9	(Switzerland) Nico Rindlisbacher		All
(Switzerland) Jenzer Motorsport	86	(Bahrain) Ali Al-Khalifa	T	All
Malta Formula Racing	10	(United States) Zackary Dante		1–5
Malta Formula Racing	82	(Malta) Keith Camilleri	T	1–3, 5, 7
(Italy) Antonelli Motorsport	12	(Italy) Andrea Russo		5–7
(Italy) Antonelli Motorsport	27	(Italy) Matteo Cairoli		1–2
(Italy) Antonelli Motorsport	28	(Brazil) João Vieira		All
(Italy) Antonelli Motorsport	29	(Switzerland) Jonathan Giudice		1–4
(Italy) Antonelli Motorsport	44	(Italy) Matteo Desideri		4–7
(Italy) F & M	15	(India) Mahaveer Raghunathan		2–7
(Italy) F & M	21	(Italy) Mattia Drudi		2–7
(Italy) F & M	23	(Italy) Giovanni Altoè		2–5
(Italy) Diegi Motorsport	12	(Italy) Andrea Russo		1–4
(Italy) Diegi Motorsport	29	(Switzerland) Jonathan Giudice		6–7
(Italy) Cram Motorsport	16	(Belgium) Max Defourny		1
(Italy) Cram Motorsport	19	(Switzerland) Edi Haxhiu		All
(Italy) Cram Motorsport	21	(Italy) Mattia Drudi		1
(Italy) Cram Motorsport	23	(Italy) Giovanni Altoè		1
(Italy) Cram Motorsport	26	(Russia) Robert Shwartzman		6–7
(Italy) Prema Powerteam	18	(Canada) Lance Stroll		All
(Italy) Prema Powerteam	22	(Japan) Takashi Kasai		1–6
(Italy) Prema Powerteam	81	(France) Brandon Maïsano	T	All
Israel F4	55	(Israel) Bar Baruch		All

Icon	Meaning
T	Trophy class

- Aleksandra Zabolotnyaya was scheduled to compete for SMP Racing by Euronova, but did not appear at any rounds.

== Race calendar and results ==
The calendar was published on 8 February 2014. The series was scheduled to be a part of the ACI Racing Weekends for five rounds during the 2014 season, with the rounds in Monza and Montmeló being held in support of International GT Open. However, the final round at Montmeló was replaced by another Imola round, and thus, all rounds were held in Italy.

Round		Circuit	Date	Pole position	Fastest lap	Winning driver	Winning team	Trophy Winner
1	R1	Adria International Raceway, Adria	8 June	(Canada) Lance Stroll	(Canada) Lance Stroll	(Canada) Lance Stroll	(Italy) Prema Powerteam	(France) Brandon Maïsano
1	R2	Adria International Raceway, Adria	8 June		(Canada) Lance Stroll	(Japan) Ukyo Sasahara	(Italy) Euronova Racing by Fortec	(France) Brandon Maïsano
1	R3	Adria International Raceway, Adria	8 June	(Canada) Lance Stroll	(Italy) Andrea Russo	(Italy) Andrea Russo	(Italy) Diegi Motorsport	(France) Brandon Maïsano
2	R1	Autodromo Enzo e Dino Ferrari, Imola	28 June	(Canada) Lance Stroll	(Canada) Lance Stroll (Note: Fastest lap recorded by Brandon Maïsano, but he was ineligible to score the fastest lap point.)	(Canada) Lance Stroll	(Italy) Prema Powerteam	(France) Brandon Maïsano
2	R2	Autodromo Enzo e Dino Ferrari, Imola	29 June		(Canada) Lance Stroll	(Italy) Mattia Drudi	(Italy) F & M	(France) Brandon Maïsano
2	R3	Autodromo Enzo e Dino Ferrari, Imola	29 June	(Canada) Lance Stroll	(Italy) Mattia Drudi	(Canada) Lance Stroll	(Italy) Prema Powerteam	(France) Brandon Maïsano
3	R1	Mugello Circuit, Scarperia e San Piero	12 July	(France) Brandon Maïsano	(Canada) Lance Stroll	(France) Brandon Maïsano	(Italy) Prema Powerteam	(France) Brandon Maïsano
3	R2	Mugello Circuit, Scarperia e San Piero	13 July		(Canada) Lance Stroll	(Canada) Lance Stroll	(Italy) Prema Powerteam	(France) Brandon Maïsano
3	R3	Mugello Circuit, Scarperia e San Piero	13 July	(France) Brandon Maïsano	(Canada) Lance Stroll	(France) Brandon Maïsano	(Italy) Prema Powerteam	(France) Brandon Maïsano
4	R1	Autodromo dell'Umbria, Magione	3 August	(Canada) Lance Stroll	(Canada) Lance Stroll	(Canada) Lance Stroll	(Italy) Prema Powerteam	(France) Brandon Maïsano
4	R2	Autodromo dell'Umbria, Magione	3 August		(Italy) Andrea Fontana	(Italy) Andrea Fontana	(Italy) Euronova Racing by Fortec	(Bahrain) Ali Al-Khalifa
4	R3	Autodromo dell'Umbria, Magione	3 August	(France) Brandon Maïsano	(Canada) Lance Stroll	(France) Brandon Maïsano	(Italy) Prema Powerteam	(France) Brandon Maïsano
5	R1	Vallelunga Circuit, Campagnano di Roma	13 September	(France) Brandon Maïsano	(Canada) Lance Stroll	(France) Brandon Maïsano	(Italy) Prema Powerteam	(France) Brandon Maïsano
5	R2	Vallelunga Circuit, Campagnano di Roma	14 September		(Canada) Lance Stroll	(Canada) Lance Stroll	(Italy) Prema Powerteam	(France) Brandon Maïsano
5	R3	Vallelunga Circuit, Campagnano di Roma	14 September	(France) Brandon Maïsano	(Italy) Mattia Drudi	(Canada) Lance Stroll	(Italy) Prema Powerteam	(France) Brandon Maïsano
6	R1	Autodromo Nazionale di Monza, Monza	27 September	(Italy) Mattia Drudi	(Switzerland) Lucas Mauron	(Italy) Mattia Drudi	(Italy) F & M	(United Kingdom) Sennan Fielding
6	R2	Autodromo Nazionale di Monza, Monza	28 September		(Italy) Mattia Drudi (Note: Fastest lap recorded by Sennan Fielding, but he was ineligible to score the fastest lap point.)	(Italy) Mattia Drudi	(Italy) F & M	(United Kingdom) Sennan Fielding
6	R3	Autodromo Nazionale di Monza, Monza	28 September	(France) Brandon Maïsano	(Italy) Mattia Drudi	(Italy) Mattia Drudi	(Italy) F & M	(France) Brandon Maïsano
7	R1	Autodromo Enzo e Dino Ferrari, Imola	11 October	(France) Brandon Maïsano	(Italy) Mattia Drudi	(France) Brandon Maïsano	(Italy) Prema Powerteam	(France) Brandon Maïsano
7	R2	Autodromo Enzo e Dino Ferrari, Imola	11 October		(Brazil) João Vieira	(United Kingdom) Sennan Fielding	(Italy) Euronova Racing by Fortec	(United Kingdom) Sennan Fielding
7	R3	Autodromo Enzo e Dino Ferrari, Imola	12 October	(France) Brandon Maïsano	(Brazil) João Vieira	(France) Brandon Maïsano	(Italy) Prema Powerteam	(France) Brandon Maïsano

== Championship standings ==
Points were awarded as follows:

	1	2	3	4	5	6	7	8	9	10	FT	FL
Race 1 & 3	25	18	15	12	10	8	6	4	2	1	**5**	1
Race 2	13	11	9	6	5	4	2	1				1

The Trophy Class had the same point system but without points for the fastest time in the qualifying sessions and fastest laps.

=== Drivers' standings ===
Pos	Driver	ADR			IMO			MUG			MGI			VLL			MNZ			IMO			Pts
Pos	Driver	R1	R2	R3	R1	R2	R3	R1	R2	R3	R1	R2	R3	R1	R2	R3	R1	R2	R3	R1	R2	R3	Pts
1	(Canada) Lance Stroll	**1**	2	**7**	**1**	2	**1**	2	1	6	**1**	Ret	2	2	1	1	4	3	Ret	WD	WD	WD	331
2	(Italy) Mattia Drudi	6	11	Ret	8	1	14	4	5	18	4	4	4	4	9	3	**1**	1	1	5	Ret	2	237
3	(Italy) Andrea Russo	3	3	1	4	10	Ret	6	2	2	7	2	5	Ret	14	7	5	Ret	5	DSQ	7	4	200
4	(Italy) Leonardo Pulcini	8	4	2	3	5	5	3	10	14	3	7	3	6	5	5	Ret	Ret	9	4	17	3	187
5	(Switzerland) Alain Valente	7	20	4	6	4	7	7	8	3	5	12	7	5	3	8	8	4	4	18	12	Ret	159
6	(Italy) Andrea Fontana				11	9	11	17	9	5	10	1	6	8	2	10	7	13	17	2	4	7	116
7	(Brazil) João Vieira	14	9	Ret	17	14	12	5	6	4	6	Ret	13	7	6	6	Ret	7	3	19	9	12	93
8	(Japan) Takashi Kasai	12	6	5	9	7	Ret	10	4	19	12	6	8	3	10	4	Ret	DNS	DNS				83
9	(Russia) Ivan Matveev	10	Ret	6	13	6	4	14	15	12	19	9	17	12	Ret	9	10	12	8	9	2	5	76
10	(Switzerland) Lucas Mauron	15	8	8	12	Ret	9	11	14	11	11	8	14	13	17	13	6	Ret	11	7	5	15	49
11	(Italy) Matteo Desideri										9	3	Ret	Ret	11	12	9	Ret	6	3	Ret	Ret	48
12	(India) Mahaveer Raghunathan				14	17	8	19	13	8	20	18	19	14	12	15	11	6	12	6	6	6	45
13	(Italy) Matteo Cairoli	4	Ret	DNS	21	16	3																33
14	(Switzerland) Edi Haxhiu	16	15	10	18	18	6	16	16	13	15	14	10	9	8	16	Ret	8	10	14	8	9	32
15	(Israel) Bar Baruch	17	10	15	Ret	12	10	15	11	7	8	5	9	11	7	Ret	15	Ret	13	16	10	13	32
16	(Russia) Robert Shwartzman																Ret	5	7	8	11	8	26
17	(Japan) Ukyo Sasahara	5	1	Ret																			25
18	(Brazil) Gustavo Bandeira	9	13	Ret	10	8	15	8	7	9	14	11	Ret										24
19	(United States) Zackary Dante	21	18	14	7	Ret	Ret	13	19	10	16	15	12	16	15	17							12
20	(Belgium) Max Defourny	11	7	9																			9
21	(Switzerland) Nico Rindlisbacher	13	14	11	16	Ret	13	12	12	15	13	10	15	15	16	15	12	9	14	13	Ret	14	4
22	(Japan) Shinji Sawada																			11	16	10	2
23	(Switzerland) Jonathan Giudice	20	17	Ret	20	15	Ret	Ret	Ret	20	17	16	16				14	10	16	12	15	Ret	1
24	(Italy) Giovanni Altoè	19	19	16	19	13	Ret	18	18	16	Ret	13	11	Ret	Ret	14							1
Italian F4 Trophy
1	(France) Brandon Maïsano	2	5	3	2	3	2	**1**	3	**1**	2	Ret	**1**	**1**	4	**2**	3	Ret	**2**	**1**	3	**1**	406
2	(Bahrain) Ali Al-Khalifa	22	16	12	15	11	Ret	DNS	20	17	18	17	18	17	18	Ret	13	11	15	15	14	Ret	230
3	(Malta) Keith Camilleri	18	12	13	5	Ret	DSQ	9	17	Ret				10	13	11				17	13	11	177
4	(United Kingdom) Sennan Fielding																2	2	Ret	10	1	Ret	69
Pos	Driver	R1	R2	R3	R1	R2	R3	R1	R2	R3	R1	R2	R3	R1	R2	R3	R1	R2	R3	R1	R2	R3	Pts
Pos	Driver	ADR			IMO			MUG			MGI			VLL			MNZ			IMO			Pts

Colour	Result
Gold	Winner
Silver	Second place
Bronze	Third place
Green	Points classification
Blue	Non-points classification
Blue	Non-classified finish (NC)
Purple	Retired, not classified (Ret)
Red	Did not qualify (DNQ)
Red	Did not pre-qualify (DNPQ)
Black	Disqualified (DSQ)
White	Did not start (DNS)
White	Withdrew (WD)
White	Race cancelled (C)
Blank	Did not practice (DNP)
Blank	Did not arrive (DNA)
Blank	Excluded (EX)

**Bold** – Pole
Italics – Fastest Lap

=== Teams' standings ===
Pos	Team	ADR			IMO			MUG			MAG			VAL			MNZ			IMO			Pts
Pos	Team	R1	R2	R3	R1	R2	R3	R1	R2	R3	R1	R2	R3	R1	R2	R3	R1	R2	R3	R1	R2	R3	Pts
1	(Italy) Prema Powerteam	1	2	5	1	2	1	2	1	6	1	6	2	2	1	1	4	3	Ret	WD	WD	WD	303
2	(Italy) Euronova Racing by Fortec	5	1	2	3	5	5	3	9	5	3	1	3	6	2	5	7	13	9	2	4	7	245
3	(Italy) F & M	6	11	16	8	1	8	4	5	8	4	4	4	4	9	3	1	1	1	5	6	2	234
4	(Switzerland) Jenzer Motorsport	7	8	4	6	4	7	7	8	3	5	8	7	5	3	8	6	4	4	7	5	14	183
5	(Italy) Antonelli Motorsport	4	9	Ret	17	14	3	5	6	4	6	3	13	7	6	6	5	7	3	3	7	4	183
6	(Italy) Diegi Motorsport	3	3	1	4	10	Ret	6	2	2	7	2	5				14	10	16	12	15	Ret	148
7	(Russia) SMP Racing by Euronova	10	Ret	6	13	6	4	14	15	12	19	9	17	12	Ret	9	10	12	8	9	2	5	76
8	(Italy) Cram Motorsport	11	7	9	18	18	6	16	16	13	15	14	10	9	8	16	Ret	5	7	8	8	8	59
9	(Italy) DAV Racing	9	13	Ret	10	8	15	8	7	9	14	11	Ret				Ret	Ret	9	4	17	3	53
10	Israel F4	17	10	15	Ret	12	10	15	11	7	8	5	9	11	7	Ret	15	Ret	13	16	10	13	34
11	Malta Formula Racing	21	18	14	7	Ret	Ret	13	19	10	16	15	12	16	15	17							12
Pos	Driver	R1	R2	R3	R1	R2	R3	R1	R2	R3	R1	R2	R3	R1	R2	R3	R1	R2	R3	R1	R2	R3	Pts
Pos	Driver	ADR			IMO			MUG			MAG			VAL			MNZ			IMO			Pts

== Italian F4 Winter Trophy ==
=== Teams and drivers ===
Team	Driver
(Italy) Adria Motorsport	(Italy) Giovanni Altoè
(Italy) Adria Motorsport	(Venezuela) Jonathan Cecotto
(Italy) Adria Motorsport	(Italy) Gianluca Gabbiani
(Italy) Antonelli Motorsport	(Brazil) João Vieira
(Italy) Antonelli Motorsport	(Italy) Matteo Desideri
(Italy) Diegi Motorsport	(Denmark) Jan Dalgård Jønck
Israel F4	(Israel) Bar Baruch
Israel F4	(Germany) Luis-Enrique Breuer
(Italy) Prema Powerteam	(Estonia) Ralf Aron
(Italy) Prema Powerteam	(China) Guanyu Zhou

=== Race calendar and results ===
All races were held at Adria International Raceway in Italy.

Race	Circuit	Date	Pole position	Fastest lap	Winning driver	Winning team
R1	Adria International Raceway, Adria	2 November	(Estonia) Ralf Aron	(Brazil) João Vieira	(Estonia) Ralf Aron	(Italy) Prema Powerteam
R2	Adria International Raceway, Adria	2 November	(Estonia) Ralf Aron	(Estonia) Ralf Aron	(Brazil) João Vieira	(Italy) Antonelli Motorsport

=== Results ===
Driver	ADR	
Driver	R1	R2
(Estonia) Ralf Aron	1	2
(Brazil) João Vieira	2	1
(China) Guanyu Zhou	3	3
(Italy) Matteo Desideri	4	5
(Denmark) Jan Dalgård Jønck	6	4
(Germany) Luis-Enrique Breuer	5	6
(Israel) Bar Baruch	7	7
(Venezuela) Jonathan Cecotto	8	8
(Italy) Gianluca Gabbiani	10	9
(Italy) Giovanni Altoè	9	10
