= Sennan Fielding =

British racing driver

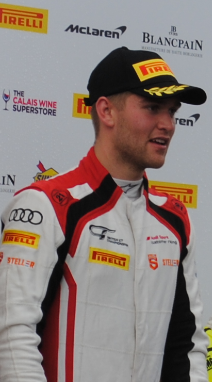
- Fielding on the top step of the podium at Donington Park in 2020
- Nationality: (United Kingdom) British
- Born: 14 November 1995 (age 30) Chesterfield, United Kingdom

British GT Championship career
- Debut season: 2018
- Current team: Steller Performance
- Categorisation: FIA Silver (2017–2022, 2026–); FIA Gold (2023–2025)
- Car number: 42
- Starts: 35
- Wins: 4
- Poles: 7
- Best finish: 1st in 2022

Previous series
- 2016 2015 2014 2014 2014 2013-14 2011-12: F4 British Championship; MSA Formula Championship; Formula Renault 2.0 NEC; Italian F4 Championship; Ginetta GT5 Championship; BRDC Formula 4 Championship; Ginetta Junior Championship

Championship titles
- 2022: British GT Championship - GT4

Sennan Fielding (born 14 November 1995 in Chesterfield) is a British racing driver.

== Career ==
=== Karting ===
Born in Chesterfield, Fielding started karting in 2006, competing in multiple tournaments across Britain.

=== Lower Formulae ===
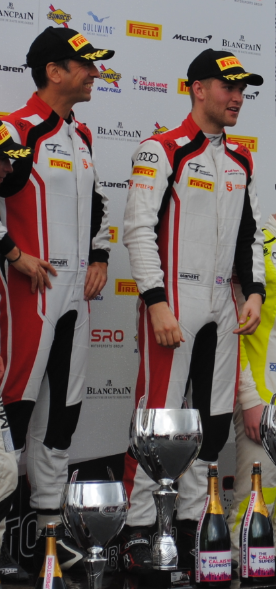
Fielding and Richard Williams on the podium at Donington Park.

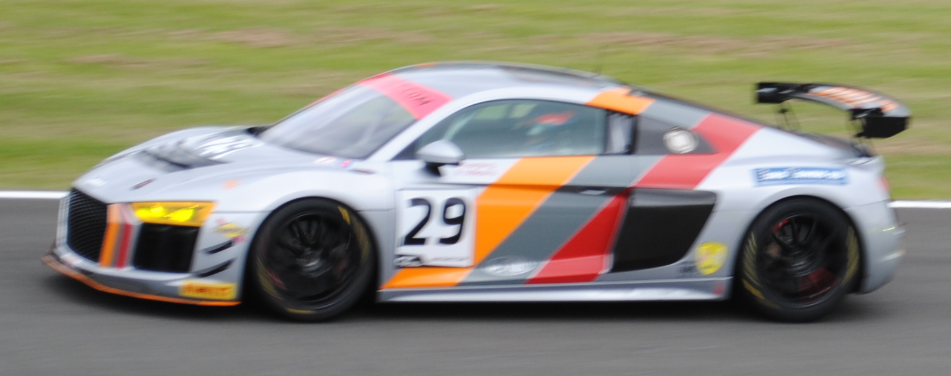
Fielding and Williams' car at Donington Park.

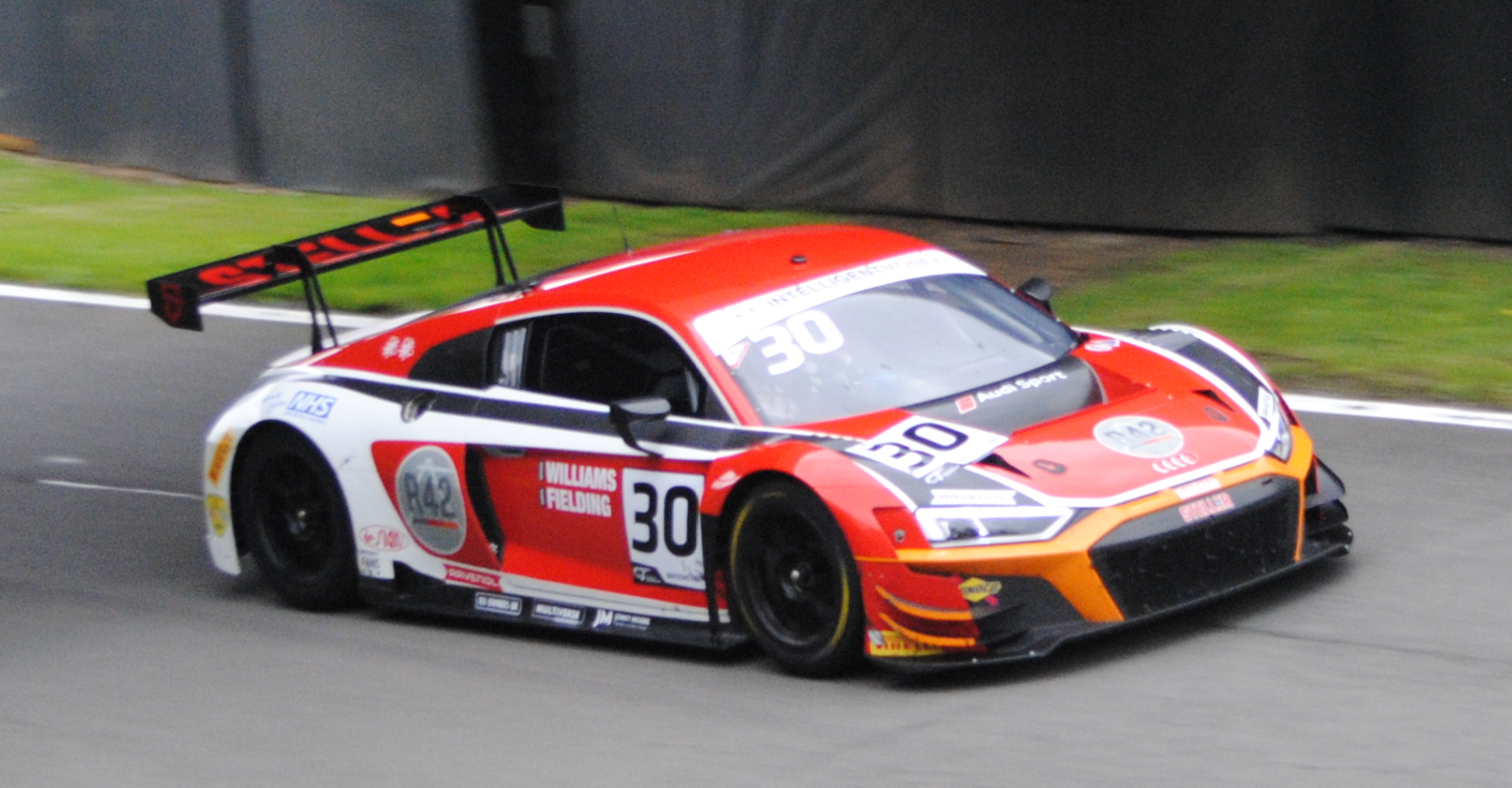
Fielding and Williams' Audi at Brands Hatch.

Fielding graduated to car racing in 2011, competing in the Ginetta Junior Championship for two seasons where he finished seventh in his debut season and vice-champion in his second.

In 2013, Fielding moved to the BRDC Formula 4 Championship with Douglas Motorsport, competing in three rounds of the 2013 season.

The following season, Fielding competed full-time with HHC Motorsport, where he took four wins to finish fourth. That same year, he joined Euronova in a round of the Formula Renault 2.0 NEC championship (though he failed to start) and the final two rounds of the Italian F4 Championship where he finished fourth in the F4 Trophy standings.

In 2015, Fielding joined the MSA Formula Championship with JHR Developments. There he took three wins and finished fourth in the championship. He remained with the team for the following season and claimed a further five victories and finished vice-champion to Max Fewtrell.

=== British GT Championship ===
Fielding made his British GT debut driving for Steller Performance in an ageing Toyota GT86 GT4 with Tom Canning and Richard Williams, finishing in the points on three occasions and ending the season in 18th with 26 points.

In 2019, Fielding drove for Steller Performance for a second year in the British GT Championship with Richard Williams in an Audi R8 LMS GT4. They only scored points on two occasions, both in which they won the race, also starting from pole position at Donington, finishing seventh in the championship standings with 62.5 points.

Fielding and Williams made their GT3 debut for Steller driving the Audi R8 LMS Evo at Brands Hatch and finished sixth overall.

In 2023, Fielding formed part of Steller's driver lineup for their Michelin Le Mans Cup campaign, driving alongside James Wood.

== Racing record ==
=== Career summary ===
Season	Series	Team	Races	Wins	Poles	F/Laps	Podiums	Points	Position
2011	Ginetta Junior Championship	TJ Motorsport	20	1	0	2	3	285	7th
2012	Ginetta Junior Championship	JHR Developments	20	5	3	5	10	481	**2nd**
2013	BRDC Formula 4 Championship	Douglas Motorspot	9	0	0	0	0	64	20th
2014	BRDC Formula 4 Championship	HHC Motorsport	24	4	2	5	9	464	4th
2014	Italian F4 Trophy	Euronova Racing	6	3	0	0	4	69	4th
2014	Formula Renault 2.0 NEC	Euronova Racing	0	0	0	0	0	0	NC
2015	MSA Formula Championship	JHR Developments	30	3	0	1	11	300	4th
2015	Formula Masters China	Absolute Racing	3	0	0	0	1	16	17th
2015	U.S. F2000 National Championship	Afterburner Autosport	3	0	0	0	0	38	17th
2016	F4 British Championship	JHR Developments	30	5	3	4	11	351	**2nd**
2017	V de V Endurance Series - PFV	Simpson Motorsport	4	1	1	0	3	113	4th
2018	British GT Championship - GT4	Steller Performance	8	0	0	0	0	26	18th
2019	British GT Championship - GT4	Steller Performance	7	2	1	0	2	62.5	7th
2019	China GT Championship - GT4	?	5	0	0	0	1	47	20th
2020	British GT Championship	Steller Performance	3	0	0	0	0	27	12th
2021	British GT Championship - GT4	Steller Performance	8	0	2	1	2	78	7th
2022	British GT Championship - GT4	Steller Performance	9	2	4	4	6	168.5	**1st**
2023	Le Mans Cup - GT3	Steller Motorsport	7	1	0	2	1	41	8th
2023	GT Cup Championship - Group GTO	Tecserv UK by Triple M Motorsport	4	3	3	3	4	94	4th*
2024	Le Mans Cup - LMP3	Steller Motorsport	5	0	0	0	0	10	20th
2024	Le Mans Cup - GT3	Steller Motorsport	1	0	0	0	0	12	17th
2024	Ultimate Cup Series - Proto P3	CMR	1	0	0	0	0	1	52nd
2026	IMSA SportsCar Championship - LMP2	JDC–Miller MotorSports	1	0	0	0	0	268	37th

=== Complete Ginetta Junior Championship results ===
(key) (Races in bold indicate pole position) (Races in italics indicate fastest lap)

Year	Team	1	2	3	4	5	6	7	8	9	10	11	12	13	14	15	16	17	18	19	20	DC	Points
2011	TJ Motorsport	BHI; 1 Ret	BHI; 2; 7	DON; 1 Ret	DON; 2; 12	THR; 1; 5	THR; 2; 7	OUL; 1; 4	OUL; 2; 8	CRO; 1; 10	CRO; 2; 10	SNE; 1; 12	SNE; 2; 7	KNO; 1; 4	KNO; 2; 9	ROC; 1; 3	ROC; 2; 3	BHGP; 1; 9	BHGP; 2 Ret	SIL; 1; 1	SIL; 2; 15	7th	285
2012	JHR Developments	**BHI**; **1**; 7	BHI; 2; 4	DON; 1; 3	DON; 2; 1	THR; 1; 8	THR; 2; 6	OUL; 1; 3	OUL; 2; 2	**CRO**; **1**; 1	**CRO**; **2**; 1	SNE; 1; 4	SNE; 2; 2	KNO; 1; 2	KNO; 2; 5	ROC; 1; 13	ROC; 2; 1	SIL; 1; 6	SIL; 2; 4	BHGP; 1; 6	BHGP; 2; 1	2nd	481

=== Complete BRDC Formula 4 Championship results ===
(key) (Races in bold indicate pole position) (Races in italics indicate fastest lap)

Year	Team	1	2	3	4	5	6	7	8	9	10	11	12	13	14	15	16	17	18	19	20	21	22	23	24	DC	Points
2013	Douglas Motorsport	SIL; 1; 12	SIL; 2; 11	SIL; 3; 7	BRH; 1; 5	BRH; 2 Ret	BRH; 3 Ret	SNE; 1; 6	SNE; 2 DNS	SNE; 3 DNS	OUL; 1	OUL; 2	OUL; 3	BRH; 1	BRH; 2	BRH; 3	SIL; 1	SIL; 2	SIL; 3	SNE; 1	SNE; 2	SNE; 3	DON; 1	DON; 2	DON; 3	20th	64
2014	HHC Motorsport	SIL; 1; 3	SIL; 2; 10	SIL; 3 DSQ	BRH; 1; 5	BRH; 2; 5	BRH; 3; 2	SNE; 1; 4	SNE; 2 NC	SNE; 3; 2	OUL; 1; 5	OUL; 2; 17	OUL; 3; 4	**SIL**; **1**; 1	SIL; 2; 1	SIL; 3; 1	BRH; 1; 6	BRH; 2; 9	BRH; 3; 4	**DON**; **1**; 1	DON; 2; 7	DON; 3; 9	SNE; 1; 3	SNE; 2; 3	SNE; 3; 4	4th	464

=== Complete MSA Formula/F4 British Championship results ===
(key) (Races in bold indicate pole position) (Races in italics indicate fastest lap)

Year	Team	1	2	3	4	5	6	7	8	9	10	11	12	13	14	15	16	17	18	19	20	21	22	23	24	25	26	27	28	29	30	DC	Points
2015	JHR Developments	BHI; 1; 4	BHI; 2 Ret	BHI; 3; 10	DON; 1; 5	DON; 2; 3	DON; 3 Ret	THR; 1 Ret	THR; 2; 10	THR; 3; 8	OUL; 1; 8	OUL; 2; 1	OUL; 3; 3	CRO; 1; 1	CRO; 2; 4	CRO; 3; 3	SNE; 1; 4	SNE; 2; 3	SNE; 3; 4	KNO; 1; 3	KNO; 2; 1	KNO; 3; 3	ROC; 1; 6	ROC; 2; 2	ROC; 3 Ret	SIL; 1; 6	SIL; 2; 2	SIL; 3 Ret	BHGP; 1 Ret	BHGP; 2; 8	BHGP; 3; 5	4th	300
2016	JHR Developments	BHI; 1; 5	BHI; 2; 1	BHI; 3; 14	DON; 1; 7	DON; 2; 1	DON; 3; 5	THR; 1; 3	THR; 2; 6	THR; 3; 5	OUL; 1; 10	OUL; 2; 9	OUL; 3; 8	CRO; 1 Ret	CRO; 2; 6	CRO; 3; 5	**SNE**; **1**; 1	SNE; 2; 5	**SNE**; **3**; 1	KNO; 1 Ret	KNO; 2; 8	KNO; 3; 4	ROC; 1; 5	ROC; 2; 1	ROC; 3; 2	**SIL**; **1**; 2	SIL; 2; 4	SIL; 3; 3	BHGP; 1; 2	BHGP; 2; 5	BHGP; 3; 3	2nd	351

=== Complete British GT Championship results ===
(key) (Races in bold indicate pole position in class) (Races in italics indicate fastest lap in class)

Year	Entrant	Chassis	Class	1	2	3	4	5	6	7	8	9	DC	Points
2018	Steller Performance	Toyota GT86 GT4	GT4	OUL; 1; 26	OUL; 2; 31	ROC; 1 Ret	SNE; 1; 20	SNE; 2; 23	SIL; 1 Ret	SPA; 1	BRH; 1; 15	DON; 1; 16	18th	26
2019	Steller Performance	Audi R8 LMS GT4	GT4	OUL; 1	OUL; 2	SNE; 1; 12	SNE; 2 DSQ	SIL; 1; 28	DON; 1; 27	SPA; 1 Ret	BRH; 1; 24	**DON**; **1**; 12	7th	62.5
2020	Steller Performance	Audi R8 LMS Evo	GT3	OUL; 1	OUL; 2	DON; 1	DON; 2	BRH; 1; 6	DON; 1; 7	SNE; 1	SNE; 2	SIL; 1; 10	12th	27
2021	Steller Performance	Audi R8 LMS GT4 Evo	GT4	BRH; 1; 17	**SIL**; **1**; 15	DON; 1 Ret	SPA; 1; 11	SNE; 1 Ret	SNE; 2 DNS	OUL; 1; 13	OUL; 2; 15	**DON**; **1**; 23	7th	78
2022	Steller Performance	Audi R8 LMS GT4 Evo	GT4	**OUL**; **1**; 16	OUL; 2; 13	**SIL**; **1**; 17	**DON**; **1**; 25	SNE; 1; 18	SNE; 2; 26	SPA; 1; 16	**BRH**; **1**; 12	DON; 1; 14	1st	168.5

=== Complete IMSA SportsCar Championship results ===
(key) (Races in bold indicate pole position; races in italics indicate fastest lap)

Year	Entrant	Class	Make	Engine	1	2	3	4	5	6	7	Rank	Points
2026	JDC–Miller MotorSports	LMP2	Oreca 07	Gibson GK428 4.2 L V8	DAY	SEB; DNS	WGL	MOS	ELK; 8	IMS	PET	37th	268

Sporting positions
Preceded by Will Burns; Gus Burton	British GT Championship; GT4 Champion; 2022; With: Richard Williams	Succeeded by Erik Evans; Matt Cowley
Preceded by Will Burns; Gus Burton	British GT Championship; GT4 Silver Champion; 2022; With: Richard Williams	Succeeded by Jack Brown; Charles Clark
