= 2015 BRDC Formula 4 Championship =

Motor racing competition

Seasons
- ← 2014 2016 →

The 2015 Duo BRDC Formula 4 Championship was a multi-event motor racing championship for open wheel, formula racing cars held across England. The championship featured a mix of professional motor racing teams and privately funded drivers competing in 2-litre Duratec single seat race cars that conformed to the technical regulations for the championship. The 2015 season was the third BRDC Formula 4 Championship organised by the British Racing Drivers' Club in the United Kingdom. The season began at Oulton Park on 4 April and ended on 27 September at Brands Hatch, after eight triple header events for a total of twenty-four races.

Will Palmer, running for the HHC Motorsport team, was a comfortable champion in the series; he wrapped up the title with one event to spare. Having been a title contender in 2014, Palmer won exactly half of the races to be held in 2015 – a series-record twelve wins – and fifteen podiums in total saw him finish 137 points clear of the championship runner-up, team-mate Harrison Newey. Newey racked up eight podium finishes before he was able to take the first of two victories during the season, at Donington Park. He added a second win at Brands Hatch, taking a total of twelve podium finishes in 2015. Third place in the drivers' championship went to Chris Dittmann Racing driver Tom Jackson, who also won two races during the season – both coming at Snetterton.

Five other drivers won races during the season; Lanan Racing duo Rodrigo Fonseca (Rockingham and Silverstone) and Chris Mealin (Oulton Park and Rockingham) each won a pair of races, as did Jordan Albert of Sean Walkinshaw Racing, winning races at Oulton Park and Brands Hatch. The remaining races were won by Jackson's team-mate Omar Ismail at Snetterton and Michael O'Brien, who won the partially reversed-grid race at Rockingham for MGR Motorsport. Of the 23 drivers eligible to score points towards the drivers' championship, 17 recorded at least one podium finish.

== Teams and drivers ==
All teams were British-registered.

Team	No.	Driver	Rounds
Douglas Motorsport	2	(India) Akhil Rabindra	All
Douglas Motorsport	24	(Mexico) Fernando Urrutia	All
HHC Motorsport	3	(United Kingdom) Will Palmer	All
HHC Motorsport	33	(United Kingdom) Harrison Newey	All
HHC Motorsport	37	(South Africa) Sisa Ngebulana	All
Chris Dittmann Racing	4	(United Kingdom) Omar Ismail	3–8
Chris Dittmann Racing	11	(Netherlands) Paul Sieljes	2
Chris Dittmann Racing	12	(United Kingdom) Tom Jackson	All
Chris Dittmann Racing	94	(United Kingdom) Michael O'Brien	4–5, 7
Hillspeed	7	(Oman) Faisal Al Zubair	1–2, 4–6, 8
Hillspeed	17	(United Kingdom) Riki Christodoulou (Note: Guest driver ineligible for any championship points.)	3
Hillspeed	51	(India) Ameya Vaidyanathan	All
Hillspeed	66	(South Africa) Sebastian Lanzetti	1–3
Hillspeed	77	(Argentina) Hernán Fallas	6–8
Lanan Racing	8	(United Kingdom) Jack Bartholomew	All
Lanan Racing	9	(Mexico) Rodrigo Fonseca	All
Lanan Racing	10	(United Kingdom) Chris Mealin	All
Lang Sport	14	(United Kingdom) Jack Lang	All
Sean Walkinshaw Racing	18	(United Kingdom) Zubair Hoque	All
Sean Walkinshaw Racing	23	(United Kingdom) Jordan Albert	All
Sean Walkinshaw Racing	32	(Spain) Marc González	4
23 Racing	44	(United Kingdom) James Reveler	All
MGR Motorsport	77	(Argentina) Hernán Fallas	1–3
MGR Motorsport	94	(United Kingdom) Michael O'Brien	1–3
Graham Brunton Racing	79	(United Kingdom) Ciaran Haggerty	All
JR Racing	95	(United Kingdom) Joe Stables	4–6, 8

== Race calendar and results ==
The calendar was published on 26 November 2014. The series supported British GT at six events, with stand-alone events at Snetterton in July and Brands Hatch in September.

Round		Circuit	Date	Pole position	Fastest lap	Winning driver	Winning team
1	R1	Oulton Park (International Circuit, Cheshire)	4 April	(United Kingdom) Will Palmer	(United Kingdom) Harrison Newey	(United Kingdom) Will Palmer	HHC Motorsport
1	R2	Oulton Park (International Circuit, Cheshire)	6 April		(United Kingdom) Jordan Albert	(United Kingdom) Chris Mealin	Lanan Racing
1	R3	Oulton Park (International Circuit, Cheshire)	6 April		(United Kingdom) Harrison Newey	(United Kingdom) Jordan Albert	Sean Walkinshaw Racing
2	R4	Rockingham (National Circuit, Northamptonshire)	2 May	(United Kingdom) Harrison Newey	(Mexico) Rodrigo Fonseca	(Mexico) Rodrigo Fonseca	Lanan Racing
2	R5	Rockingham (National Circuit, Northamptonshire)	3 May		(United Kingdom) Tom Jackson	(United Kingdom) Michael O'Brien	MGR Motorsport
2	R6	Rockingham (National Circuit, Northamptonshire)	3 May		(Mexico) Rodrigo Fonseca	(United Kingdom) Chris Mealin	Lanan Racing
3	R7	Silverstone Circuit (Grand Prix, Northamptonshire)	30 May	(United Kingdom) Will Palmer	(United Kingdom) Will Palmer	(United Kingdom) Will Palmer	HHC Motorsport
3	R8	Silverstone Circuit (Grand Prix, Northamptonshire)	31 May		(United Kingdom) Ciaran Haggerty	(Mexico) Rodrigo Fonseca	Lanan Racing
3	R9	Silverstone Circuit (Grand Prix, Northamptonshire)	31 May		(United Kingdom) Will Palmer	(United Kingdom) Will Palmer	HHC Motorsport
4	R10	Snetterton Circuit (300 Circuit, Norfolk)	11 July	(United Kingdom) Omar Ismail	(United Kingdom) Harrison Newey	(United Kingdom) Omar Ismail	Chris Dittmann Racing
4	R11	Snetterton Circuit (300 Circuit, Norfolk)	12 July		(United Kingdom) Will Palmer	(United Kingdom) Tom Jackson	Chris Dittmann Racing
4	R12	Snetterton Circuit (300 Circuit, Norfolk)	12 July		(United Kingdom) Will Palmer	(United Kingdom) Will Palmer	HHC Motorsport
5	R13	Brands Hatch (Grand Prix Circuit, Kent)	1 August	(United Kingdom) Will Palmer	(United Kingdom) Will Palmer	(United Kingdom) Will Palmer	HHC Motorsport
5	R14	Brands Hatch (Grand Prix Circuit, Kent)	2 August		(United Kingdom) Will Palmer	(United Kingdom) Jordan Albert	Sean Walkinshaw Racing
5	R15	Brands Hatch (Grand Prix Circuit, Kent)	2 August		(United Kingdom) Will Palmer	(United Kingdom) Will Palmer	HHC Motorsport
6	R16	Snetterton Circuit (300 Circuit, Norfolk)	22 August	(United Kingdom) Will Palmer	(United Kingdom) Will Palmer	(United Kingdom) Will Palmer	HHC Motorsport
6	R17	Snetterton Circuit (300 Circuit, Norfolk)	23 August		(United Kingdom) Tom Jackson	(United Kingdom) Tom Jackson	Chris Dittmann Racing
6	R18	Snetterton Circuit (300 Circuit, Norfolk)	23 August		(United Kingdom) Will Palmer	(United Kingdom) Will Palmer	HHC Motorsport
7	R19	Donington Park (Grand Prix Circuit, Leicestershire)	12 September	(United Kingdom) Harrison Newey	(United Kingdom) Will Palmer	(United Kingdom) Harrison Newey	HHC Motorsport
7	R20	Donington Park (Grand Prix Circuit, Leicestershire)	13 September		(United Kingdom) Will Palmer	(United Kingdom) Will Palmer	HHC Motorsport
7	R21	Donington Park (Grand Prix Circuit, Leicestershire)	13 September		(United Kingdom) Will Palmer	(United Kingdom) Will Palmer	HHC Motorsport
8	R22	Brands Hatch (Indy Circuit, Kent)	26 September	(United Kingdom) Will Palmer	(United Kingdom) Will Palmer	(United Kingdom) Will Palmer	HHC Motorsport
8	R23	Brands Hatch (Indy Circuit, Kent)	27 September		(United Kingdom) Will Palmer	(United Kingdom) Harrison Newey	HHC Motorsport
8	R24	Brands Hatch (Indy Circuit, Kent)	27 September		(United Kingdom) Will Palmer	(United Kingdom) Will Palmer	HHC Motorsport

== Championship standings ==
Scoring system

Points were awarded to the top 20 classified finishers in all races.

Races	Position, points per race																			
Races	1st	2nd	3rd	4th	5th	6th	7th	8th	9th	10th	11th	12th	13th	14th	15th	16th	17th	18th	19th	20th
Races 1 & 3	35	29	24	21	19	17	15	13	12	11	10	9	8	7	6	5	4	3	2	1
Race 2	25	22	20	18	16	15	14	13	12	11	10	9	8	7	6	5	4	3	2	1

=== Drivers' championship ===
Pos.	Driver	OUL			ROC			SIL			SNE			BRH			SNE			DON			BRH			Points
1	(United Kingdom) Will Palmer	**1**	3	5	Ret	5	8	**1**	4	1	2	18	1	**1**	4	1	**1**	Ret	1	2	1	1	**1**	6	1	592
2	(United Kingdom) Harrison Newey	2	6	9	**Ret**	4	12	Ret	6	2	3	15	2	4	2	11	2	2	3	**1**	7	3	8	1	2	455
3	(United Kingdom) Tom Jackson	4	5	4	Ret	2	5	4	3	10	16	1	4	3	3	5	3	1	2	10	6	12	13	12	3	420
4	(Mexico) Rodrigo Fonseca	9	8	3	1	8	2	15	1	3	6	2	7	10	5	6	7	Ret	12	DSQ	9	2	3	3	4	409
5	(United Kingdom) Ciaran Haggerty	6	2	7	13	Ret	Ret	2	14	6	7	4	3	2	6	3	4	6	5	4	4	5	4	5	8	406
6	(United Kingdom) Jordan Albert	18	16	1	5	3	Ret	3	5	4	5	5	Ret	7	1	9	13	5	7	8	8	9	5	4	7	359
7	(United Kingdom) Jack Bartholomew	5	4	6	6	9	4	6	8	15	Ret	3	11	Ret	11	4	12	8	6	6	2	8	9	8	10	329
8	(United Kingdom) Chris Mealin	7	1	2	4	6	1	16	DSQ	7	NC	6	10	8	8	7	9	DSQ	8	7	10	Ret	10	9	Ret	303
9	(United Kingdom) Omar Ismail							7	Ret	17	**1**	7	5	6	7	2	5	4	4	5	5	6	Ret	19	Ret	260
10	(United Kingdom) Jack Lang	12	9	Ret	3	Ret	6	Ret	15	16	14	8	6	5	Ret	18	10	7	10	Ret	11	11	7	2	6	244
11	(South Africa) Sisa Ngebulana	8	15	11	12	16	7	5	2	18	15	Ret	9	9	Ret	8	11	13	13	14	14	Ret	6	7	5	221
12	(India) Ameya Vaidyanathan	16	Ret	12	2	17	Ret	13	16	14	12	9	16	Ret	12	14	16	Ret	9	3	3	7	11	13	9	217
13	(India) Akhil Rabindra	11	10	15	11	7	15	Ret	11	8	8	13	12	11	Ret	10	8	Ret	14	9	16	10	14	14	15	203
14	(United Kingdom) Zubair Hoque	15	14	8	10	12	3	10	12	12	Ret	14	13	16	13	15	14	9	15	13	12	16	16	15	13	201
15	(Mexico) Fernando Urrutia	10	12	10	Ret	11	14	9	7	11	Ret	12	8	12	10	13	Ret	Ret	16	Ret	15	14	2	10	Ret	194
16	(Oman) Faisal Al Zubair	14	13	13	9	14	10				9	10	14	13	9	12	6	3	11				12	11	11	189
17	(United Kingdom) Michael O'Brien	13	11	14	8	1	Ret	12	10	13	4	11	15	17	Ret	Ret				11	Ret	15				150
18	(United Kingdom) James Reveler	19	17	16	14	15	13	14	17	20	10	16	17	14	14	16	18	11	19	12	13	13	18	16	Ret	134
19	(Argentina) Hernán Fallas	17	Ret	17	Ret	10	Ret	8	Ret	19							17	10	18	15	17	4	15	17	12	103
20	(South Africa) Sebastian Lanzetti	3	7	Ret	15	Ret	9	11	13	9																89
21	(United Kingdom) Joe Stables										13	17	19	15	15	17	15	12	17				17	18	14	63
22	(Netherlands) Paul Sieljes				7	13	11																			34
23	(Spain) Marc González										11	Ret	18													13
Guest drivers ineligible for points
	(United Kingdom) Riki Christodoulou							Ret	9	5																
Pos.	Driver	OUL			ROC			SIL			SNE			BRH			SNE			DON			BRH			Points

Colour	Result
Gold	Winner
Silver	Second place
Bronze	Third place
Green	Points classification
Blue	Non-points classification
Blue	Non-classified finish (NC)
Purple	Retired, not classified (Ret)
Red	Did not qualify (DNQ)
Red	Did not pre-qualify (DNPQ)
Black	Disqualified (DSQ)
White	Did not start (DNS)
White	Withdrew (WD)
White	Race cancelled (C)
Blank	Did not practice (DNP)
Blank	Did not arrive (DNA)
Blank	Excluded (EX)

**Bold** – Pole
Italics – Fastest Lap

=== Jack Cavill Pole Position Cup ===
The Jack Cavill Pole Position Cup was awarded to the driver who started from pole position most often throughout the season. Will Palmer was the winner of the Cup, starting 10 of the 24 races from pole position.

Pos.	Driver	Poles
1	(United Kingdom) Will Palmer	10
2	(United Kingdom) Harrison Newey	4
3	(United Kingdom) Jordan Albert	2
3	(India) Akhil Rabindra	2
5	(Argentina) Hernán Fallas	1
5	(Mexico) Rodrigo Fonseca	1
5	(United Kingdom) Omar Ismail	1
5	(United Kingdom) Chris Mealin	1
5	(South Africa) Sisa Ngebulana	1
5	(United Kingdom) Michael O'Brien	1
