= Matthew Richard Bell =

British racing driver (born 1990)

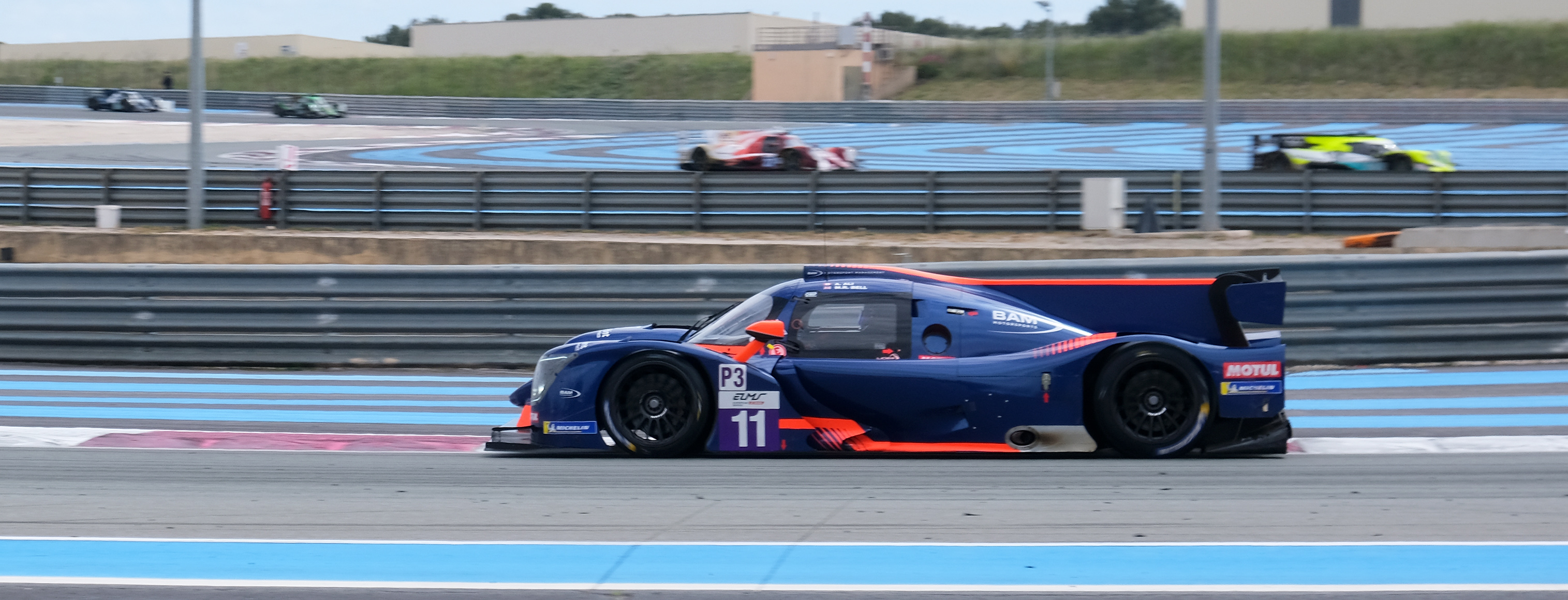
- Bell at Circuit Paul Ricard in 2024
- Nationality: (United Kingdom) British
- Born: 31 March 1990 (age 36) Winchester, England
- Categorisation: FIA Silver (2022); FIA Bronze (2023–)

Matthew Richard Bell (born 31 March 1990) is a British racing driver who last competed for EuroInternational in the LMP3 class of the European Le Mans Series.

Bell also represented Great Britain in the 2010 ISSF World Shooting Championships, finishing 13th in the Double Trap Men Junior Individual competition.

== Early career ==
Following a karting career headlined by winning the 2005 Super 1 National Junior TKM Extreme championship, Bell stepped up to single-seaters in 2007, racing in Formula BMW UK on a part-time basis before racing sporadically in Formula Palmer Audi and Formula BMW Europe until 2012. After competing in the Radical Clubman's Cup in 2012, he returned to single-seaters the following year, joining the inaugural season of the BRDC Formula 4 Championship as a privateer with sponsorship from E-Lites.

Winning the championship's first ever race at Silverstone, Bell won at Brands Hatch and Oulton Park before joining Douglas Motorsport for the final three rounds of the season. Finishing no higher than seventh in the last six races, Bell ended the season eighth in points.

== Prototype career ==
During 2022, Bell was set to make his LMP3 debut at the 4 Hours of Monza, but was replaced by Jérôme de Sadeleer ahead of the event as it emerged that he was rated as an FIA Silver instead of a Bronze. After being classified as Bronze ahead of the 2023 season, Bell joined EuroInternational to compete in LMP3 class of the 2023 European Le Mans Series alongside Adam Ali. Scoring his first LMP3 podium at Spa, Bell took his maiden series win at the finale in Portimão and ended the season runner-up in points.

In 2024, Bell returned to EuroInternational for his sophomore season in European Le Mans Series alongside Adam Ali. Bell won at Imola and Circuit de Spa-Francorchamps to once again finish runner-up in the LMP3 standings. Bell was originally set to return to EuroInternational for a third season in the European Le Mans Series, but was replaced by French racing driver Fabien Michal before the season started.

The following year, Bell returned to the Italian team for 2026 for a third season in the European Le Mans Series, alongside Douwe Dedecker and Max van der Snel. On his return to racing, Bell took a lone podium at Spa to end the year sixth in the LMP3 standings.

== Karting record ==
=== Karting career summary ===
Season	Series	Team	Position
2002	Super 1 National Championship - TKM Junior		20th
2005	Renault Elite League – Super Libre		13th
2005	Super 1 National Championship Junior TKM Extreme Championship		1st
2006	Super 1 National Championship Formula TKM Extreme Championship		3rd

== Racing record ==
=== Racing career summary ===
Season	Series	Team	Races	Wins	Poles	F/Laps	Podiums	Points	Position
2007	Formula BMW UK	Motaworld Racing	6	0	0	0	0	90	18th
2007	Formula BMW World Final	Motaworld Racing	1	0	0	0	0	N/A	15th
2008	Formula Palmer Audi Autumn Trophy		5	0	0	0	0	16	21st
2009	Formula BMW Europe	Motaworld Racing	2	0	0	0	0	0	27th
2010	Formula Palmer Audi		3	0	0	0	0	31	20th
2012	Performance Direct Radical Clubman's Cup	RAW Motorsport	13	6	7	6	12	277	**3rd**
2012	Radical UK Cup - Supersport	RAW Motorsport	2	1	1	0	2	0	NC
2013	BRDC Formula 4 Championship	MattRBellRacing Team E-Lites	15	3	2	1	3	288	8th
2013	BRDC Formula 4 Championship	Douglas Team E-Lites	9	0	0	0	0	288	8th
2015	Radical Enduro Championship	Nielsen Racing	5	0	0	0	2	267	5th
2021	Radical Challenge Championship - Solo Challenge	RAW Motorsport	15	9	9	7	13	724	**1st**
2022	Praga Cup UK	RAW Motorsport	3	0	1	0	3	27	27th
2023	European Le Mans Series – LMP3	EuroInternational	6	1	0	1	2	70	**2nd**
2024	European Le Mans Series – LMP3	EuroInternational	6	2	0	0	4	98	**2nd**
2024	European Endurance Prototype Cup – LMP3	EuroInternational	1	0	0	0	0	4	47th
2026	European Le Mans Series – LMP3	EuroInternational	6	0	0	1	1	63	6th

=== Complete BRDC Formula 4 Championship results ===
(key) (Races in bold indicate pole position) (Races in italics indicate points for the fastest lap of top ten finishers)

Year	Team	1	2	3	4	5	6	7	8	9	10	11	12	13	14	15	16	17	18	19	20	21	22	23	24	DC	Points
2013	MattRBellRacing Team E-Lites	SIL1; 1; 1	SIL1; 2; 4	SIL1; 3; 5	BRH1; 1; 8	**BRH1**; **2**; 1	BRH1; 3; 7	SNE1; 1; 7	SNE1; 2 DNS	SNE1; 3 Ret	OUL; 1; 8	**OUL**; **2**; 1	OUL; 3; 11	BRH2; 1; 10	BRH2; 2 Ret	BRH2; 3; 12										8th	288
2013	Douglas Team E-Lites																SIL2; 1; 9	SIL2; 2; 15	SIL2; 3; 12	SNE2; 1 Ret	SNE2; 2; 15	SNE2; 3; 7	DON; 1; 11	DON; 2; 11	DON; 3; 8	8th	288

=== Complete European Le Mans Series results ===
(key) (Races in bold indicate pole position; results in italics indicate fastest lap)

Year	Entrant	Class	Chassis	Engine	1	2	3	4	5	6	Rank	Points
2023	EuroInternational	LMP3	Ligier JS P320	Nissan VK56DE 5.6L V8	CAT; 4	LEC; 7	ARA; 5	SPA; 3	PRT; 9	ALG; 1	2nd	70
2024	EuroInternational	LMP3	Ligier JS P320	Nissan VK56DE 5.6L V8	CAT; 3	LEC; 4	IMO; 1	SPA; 1	MUG; 7	ALG; 3	2nd	98
2026	EuroInternational	LMP3	Ligier JS P325	Toyota V35A 3.5 L V6	CAT; 4	LEC; DSQ	IMO; 4	SPA; 3	SIL; 4	ALG; 4	6th	63
