= Freddie Slater =

Freddie Slater may refer to:

- Freddie Slater (racing driver) (born 2008), British racing driver
- Freddie Slater (EastEnders), fictional character in the UK soap opera EastEnders, played by Bobby Brazier
