= Rahul Raj Mayer =

Malaysian racing driver

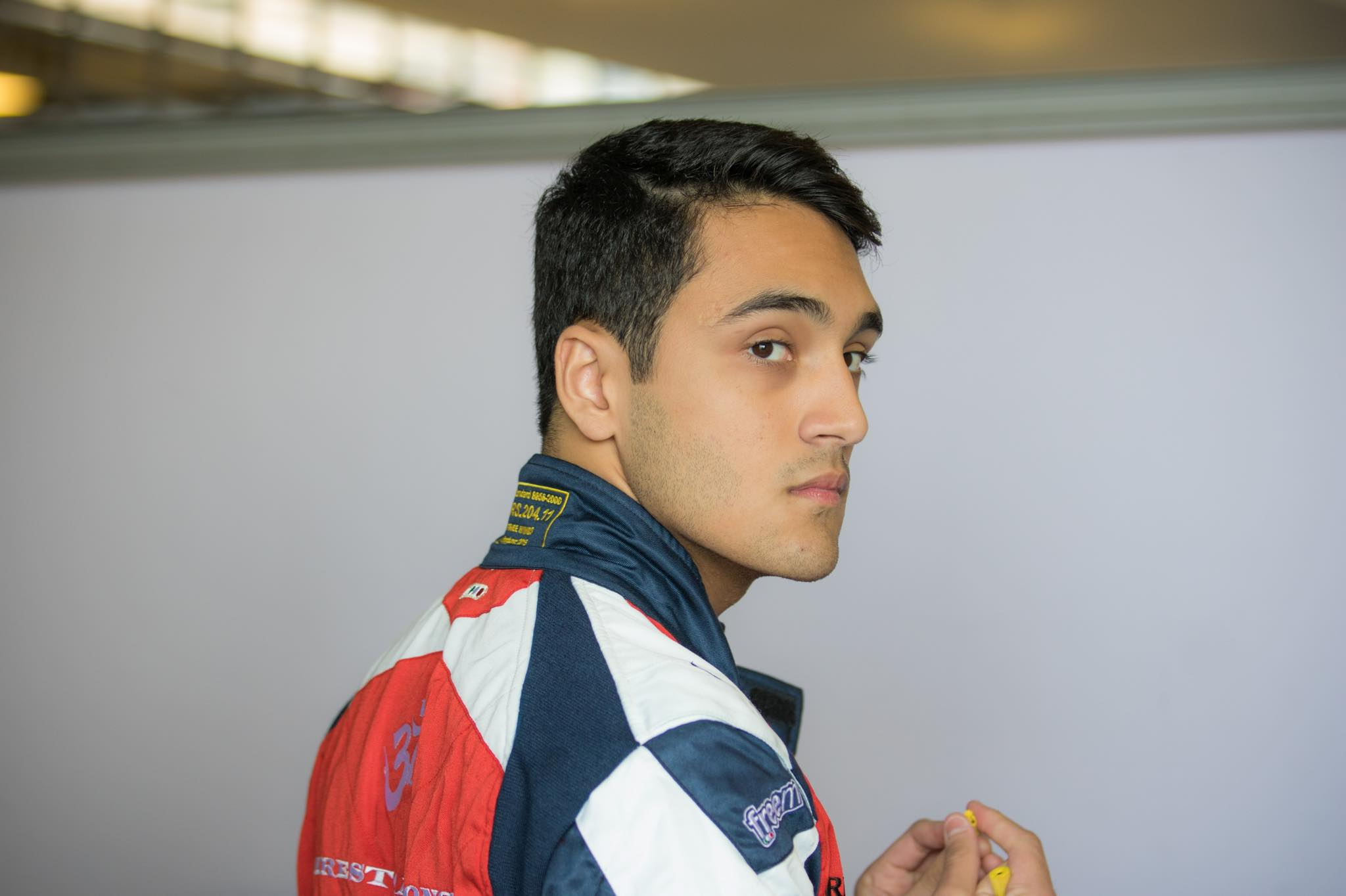
- Rahul Raj Mayer
- Born: 20 July 1996 (age 30) Kuala Lumpur, Malaysia
- Debut season: 2008
- Current team: HiRev Dreamchaser

Malaysian Championship Series
- Teams: HiRev Dreamchaser
- Car number: 100
- Co-driver: Fitra Eri
- Best finish: 1st in 2023

Rahul Raj Mayer (born 20 July 1996 in Kuala Lumpur) is a Malaysian racing driver.

== Career ==
Mayer was born in Selangor, Malaysia. In 2007, at the age of eleven, he began his karting career. Starting his official racing career in 2008, he came in third in the Yamaha SL Cup (Junior) series.

In 2009, Mayer came in second in the Asian Karting Open Championship (Formula 125 Junior Open). In 2010, he came in second for the Yamaha SL Cup (Senior) and third for the Rotax Max Challenge Malaysia (Junior) series.

In 2011, Mayer raced in Japan in the Iame X30 Championship where he came in 8th. In 2012 he competed in the All Stars Karting Invitational (KF2) and Rotax Invitational Race (Rotax Senior) and came in third and second respectively.

In 2012, Mayer competed in single seater racing, starting his career in the Formula Gulf 1000 (FG1000) Championship where after two wins, ten podiums, a pole position and three fastest laps, he ended the year second place in the Championship.

In 2013. Mayer travelled to the UK to compete in the BRDC Formula 4 Series with team Hillspeed Racing. He completed the year in 17th place.

In 2014, again with Hillspeed and with more experience, Mayer competed in BRDC Formula 4 and ended the year in 12th place..

In 2015, Mayer was signed to Mark Burdett Motorsport and raced in the NEC Formula Renault Monza.

In late 2015 Mayer, after a six month hiatus Mayer participated in the official FIA GP3 test with Campos Racing.

This marked the end of a professional motorsport campaign for Mayer as he faced a lack of funding. Through his hiatus from motorsport, he then spent the next eight years pursuing higher education as well as co-founding two separate businesses.

== Motorsports return ==
In 2022, Mayer reignited his motorsports career by competing in the Sepang 1000KM event in the SP2 category with HiRev Dreamchaser which saw him end with a "DNF" due to technical difficulties.

In 2023, Mayer began his campaign with an entry into the 6th season of the Toyota Gazoo Championship. "With his long experience in motorsport, Rahul is in the Super Sporting Class for elite and professional drivers" which will see him compete against 14 other drivers. In addition to this, Mayer has also confirmed that he is now racing in the Malaysian Championship Series partnering Mitchell Cheah in the Malaysian Touring Car category.

== Racing Record ==
=== Complete Formula Renault 2.0 NEC results ===
(key) (Races in bold indicate pole position) (Races in italics indicate fastest lap)

Year	Entrant	1	2	3	4	5	6	7	8	9	10	11	12	13	14	15	16	DC	Points
2015	Mark Burdett Motorsport	MNZ; 1; 18	MNZ; 2 Ret	SIL; 1; 23	SIL; 2; 20	RBR; 1; 15	RBR; 2; 14	RBR; 3; 13	SPA; 1 WD	SPA; 2 WD	ASS; 1	ASS; 2	NÜR; 1	NÜR; 2	HOC; 1	HOC; 2	HOC; 3	27th	25
