= GB3 Championship =

Open-wheel motorsport formula based in the United Kingdom

- Category: Single seaters
- Country: United Kingdom
- Inaugural season: 2013
- Constructors: Tatuus
- Engine suppliers: Ford Duratec
- Tyre suppliers: Pirelli
- Drivers' champion: (Australia) Alex Ninovic
- Teams' champion: (New Zealand) Rodin Motorsport
- Official website: www.gb-3.net

The GB3 Championship is a single seater motorsport series based in the United Kingdom. The championship is the UK's premier single-seater category, and is aimed at young racing drivers moving up from FIA Formula 4 championships, the GB4 Championship or Karting. Having previously been known since 2013 as the BRDC Formula 4 Championship, the championship was renamed the BRDC British Formula 3 Championship with the backing of the FIA in March 2016. The championship was rebranded to GB3 Championship in August 2021.

Like most junior formula series, it is a spec series, meaning all competitors use identical cars, engines, and tyres. While not officially branded as a Formula Regional series, the car specification for the 2025 season conforms to that of Formula Regional. Previous cars have been similar in performance to FR.

== History ==
The predecessor of the GB3 Championship was the Formula 4 racing series operated by the 750 Motor Club. The series was awarded to MotorSport Vision from the 2013 season. Under the BRDC F4 moniker, British driver Jake Hughes was the first champion of the series in 2013, driving for Lanan Racing. The championship top three of Hughes, vice-champion Seb Morris and Charlie Robertson were all finalists in that year's McLaren Autosport BRDC Award.

In 2014, George Russell was crowned champion following a dramatic victory in the season finale at Snetterton. Russell beat his Lanan Racing teammate Arjun Maini by just three points and went on to win the 2014 McLaren Autosport BRDC Award later in the year.

Will Palmer was crowned the 2015, champion after a dominant campaign in which he took 12 victories from the 24 races. His HHC Motorsport teammate Harri Newey finished as runner-up, with Palmer subsequently named as the winner of the McLaren Autosport BRDC Award in December.

On 23 March 2016, the FIA and MSA revealed to the FIA World Motor Sport Council that an agreement had been reached the day prior to rebrand the BRDC Formula 4 Championship in order to reflect the increased pace of the new car designed for the 2016 season, and to fill the void left after the British Formula 3 Championship folded in 2014.

In the first season of BRDC British F3, Matheus Leist secured the championship in the final weekend of the season, while British driver Lando Norris won three races and was named the winner of the 2016 McLaren Autosport BRDC Award in December.

Enaam Ahmed claimed the title after a dominant campaign in 2017 which saw him win a total of 13 races.

Linus Lundqvist won the championship in 2018, which also saw him claim a prize drive at the 2019 24 Hours of Daytona. Subsequent champions were Clement Novalak and Kaylen Frederick, both driving for Carlin.

In August 2021 the series was renamed as GB3 Championship, after the FIA decided to restrict the use of "F3" to the FIA Formula 3 Championship, and the 2021 car did not meet FIA standards for Formula Regional accreditation. British racing driver Zak O'Sullivan was the first to win the title under the new name. The following month, MSV announced a new support series would be launched with the GB4 Championship.

Shortly after the rebrand, the series announced a new car would be used for 2022, the Tatuus MSV-022, with performance and safety upgrades including the addition of the halo. The new car has proven to be around two to three seconds a lap quicker than its predecessor.

For 2025, the series will introduce the Tatuus MSV GB3-025, which will feature "F1-inspired aero", DRS and a new Mountune 2.0L generating 280bhp, among other changes.

== Points system ==
Points are awarded to all finishing drivers in each race, except the reverse grid race two, using the following system in 2013:

Place	1	2	3	4	5	6	7	8	9	10	11	12	13	14	15	16	17	18	19	20
Points	30	25	20	18	16	15	14	13	12	11	10	9	8	7	6	5	4	3	2	1

Points are awarded to all finishing drivers in each race, using the following system since 2014:

Races	Position, points per race																			
Races	1st	2nd	3rd	4th	5th	6th	7th	8th	9th	10th	11th	12th	13th	14th	15th	16th	17th	18th	19th	20th
Races 1 & 3	35	29	24	21	19	17	15	13	12	11	10	9	8	7	6	5	4	3	2	1
Reverse grid race (2)	25	22	20	18	16	15	14	13	12	11	10	9	8	7	6	5	4	3	2	1

In the reverse grid races, an extra point is awarded per position gained compared to each drivers' starting position.

== Champions ==
=== Operating under 750 Motor Club ===
All champions were British-registered.

Season	Champion	Class A2	Class B	Class C	Class D	Class E
2006	(United Kingdom) Chris Lewis		(United Kingdom) Chris Vinall	(United Kingdom) Peter Monk	(United Kingdom) Paul Rider	(United Kingdom) Malcolm Scott
2007	(United Kingdom) Steve Savage		(United Kingdom) Chris Kite	(United Kingdom) Clive Yorath	(United Kingdom) Stuart Wright	(United Kingdom) Jennifer Scott
2008	(United Kingdom) Jeremy Walker		(United Kingdom) Clive Yorath	(United Kingdom) Oliver Sirrell		
2009	(United Kingdom) Jonathan Weston-Taylor	(United Kingdom) Will Thompson (as Revelation Series)	(United Kingdom) Charles Adrian	(United Kingdom) Paul Presgraves		
2010	(United Kingdom) Malcolm Scott	(United Kingdom) David Woodsworth-Dale	(United Kingdom) Clive Yorath	(United Kingdom) Paul Presgraves	(United Kingdom) John Whitbourn	
2011	(United Kingdom) Oliver Sirrell		(United Kingdom) Charles Adrian	(United Kingdom) Ashley Dibden	(United Kingdom) Scott Moakes	

=== BRDC Formula 4 Championship ===
Season	Champion	Jack Cavill Pole Position Cup	Winter Series Champion	Autumn Trophy Champion	The Who Zooms Award
2013	(United Kingdom) Jake Hughes	(United Kingdom) Jake Hughes	(United Kingdom) Matthew Graham	not awarded	(Poland) Gosia Rdest
2014	(United Kingdom) George Russell	(United Kingdom) George Russell	(United Kingdom) Will Palmer	not awarded	not awarded
2015 (2015 AT)	(United Kingdom) Will Palmer	(United Kingdom) Will Palmer	not awarded	(United Kingdom) Ben Barnicoat	not awarded

=== BRDC British Formula 3 Championship ===
Season	Champion	Secondary champion
2016	(Brazil) Matheus Leist	J: (United Kingdom) Ricky Collard; A: (United Kingdom) Enaam Ahmed
2017	(United Kingdom) Enaam Ahmed	J: (United Kingdom) Enaam Ahmed; D: (United Kingdom) Carlin
2018	(Sweden) Linus Lundqvist	not awarded
2019	(United Kingdom) Clément Novalak (Note: Clément Novalak is a Franco-Swiss driver who competed under a British licence.)	not awarded
2020	(United States) Kaylen Frederick	not awarded

=== GB3 Championship ===
Season	Champion
2021	(United Kingdom) Zak O'Sullivan
2022	(United Kingdom) Luke Browning
2023	(United Kingdom) Callum Voisin
2024	(New Zealand) Louis Sharp
2025	(Australia) Alex Ninovic
