= Alpine Academy =

Program to support young racing drivers through their careers

(France) Alpine Academy
- Founded: 2002; 24 years ago (as RF1 Driver Programme)
- Base: Enstone, Oxfordshire, England
- Team principal(s): Julian Rouse (Director)
- Current drivers: Formula 2 (Republic of Ireland) Alex Dunne (India) Kush Maini (Italy) Gabriele Minì; Eurocup-3 (United Arab Emirates) Keanu Al Azhari; Formula Regional (Singapore) Kabir Anurag; F1 Academy (Netherlands) Nina Gademan; Karting (Canada) Ilie Tristan Crisan (United Kingdom) Sukhmani Kaur Khera
- Website: https://www.alpine-cars.co.uk/formula-1/alpine-academy.html

The Alpine Academy, formerly known as the RF1 Driver Programme, Renault Driver Development and Renault Sport Academy, is a driver development programme to support young racing drivers through their careers. The programme was created by Renault F1 in 2002.

In 2011, the programme was renamed LRGP Academy, following the rebranding of the team to "Lotus Renault GP". In 2012, the programme was renamed Lotus F1 Team iRace Professional Programme and 2013–2015, the programme was renamed Lotus F1 Junior Team. In 2021, the programme was renamed Alpine Academy after the rebranding of the Renault F1 team into Alpine F1 Team. In March 2022, the Alpine Affiliates programme was launched as a support to drivers starting their motorsport careers, and is intended to be a feeder for the Alpine Academy. However, it was merged into Alpine Academy at the start of 2023.

== Current drivers ==
Driver	Years	Current Series	Titles as Alpine junior
(India) Kush Maini	2023–	FIA Formula 2 Championship	none
(Italy) Gabriele Minì	2023–	FIA Formula 2 Championship	none
(Singapore) Kabir Anurag	2024–	Formula Regional Middle East Trophy; Formula Regional European Championship	none
(United Arab Emirates) Keanu Al Azhari	2025–	Eurocup-3 Spanish Winter Championship; Eurocup-3	Eurocup-3 Spanish Winter Championship (2026)
(Netherlands) Nina Gademan	2025–	F1 Academy	none
(United Kingdom) Sukhmani Khera	2025– (Note: Khera was a member of the Rac(H)er Programme in 2023–2024, and graduated to the Alpine Academy in 2025.)	Karting (X30 Junior)	none
(Canada) Ilie Tristan Crisan	2025-	Karting (OK)	None
(Republic of Ireland) Alex Dunne	2026–	FIA Formula 2 Championship	none

== Graduates to Formula 1 ==
This list contains the drivers that have graduated to Formula 1 while being supported by Renault, Lotus Renault, or Alpine. Therefore, drivers who have had support in the past and entered Formula 1 through other means are not included. For example, both Zhou Guanyu and Oscar Piastri were members of the Alpine Academy, however, they broke their ties with the academy to pursue a graduation to Formula 1 with another team.

Driver	Academy experience		F1 experience with Renault/Lotus/Alpine	F1 experience with other teams
Driver	Years	Former series	F1 experience with Renault/Lotus/Alpine	F1 experience with other teams
(Finland) Heikki Kovalainen	2002–2005	British Formula 3 Championship (2002); World Series by Nissan (2003–2004); GP2 Series (2005)	2007; 2013	McLaren (2008–2009); Team Lotus (2010–2011); Caterham (2012)
(France) Romain Grosjean	2006–2009	Formula 3 Euro Series (2006–2007); GP2 Asia Series (2008); GP2 Series (2008–2009)	2009; 2012–2015	Haas (2016–2020)
(Australia) Jack Doohan	2022–2024	FIA Formula 2 Championship (2022–2023)	2024–2025	—N/a

== Former drivers ==
=== Renault / Lotus Renault GP (2002–2011) ===
Driver	Years	Series competed	F1 Team(s)
(Brazil) Fabio Carbone	2002	British Formula 3 Championship (2002)	None
(Poland) Robert Kubica	2002	Italian Formula Renault Championship (2002)	BMW Sauber (2006–2009); Renault (2010); Williams (2019); Alfa Romeo (2021)
(Portugal) Tiago Monteiro	2002	French Formula Three Championship (2002); International Formula 3000 (2002)	Jordan (2005); Midland F1 (2006)
(Netherlands) Carlo van Dam	2002	Karting (2002)	None
(France) Eric Salignon	2002–2003	**Eurocup Formula Renault 2.0** (**2002**); Championnat de France Formula Renault 2.0 (2002); British Formula 3 Championship (2003)	None
(United Kingdom) Danny Watts	2003	British Formula 3 Championship (2003)	None
(Argentina) José María López	2003–2006	**Formula Renault V6 Eurocup** (**2003**); International Formula 3000 (2004); GP2 Series (2005–2006)	None
(Netherlands) Giedo van der Garde	2004	Formula 3 Euro Series (2004)	Caterham (2013)
(France) Loïc Duval	2004–2005	Formula 3 Euro Series (2004–2005)	None
(Venezuela) Pastor Maldonado	2004–2005	**Italian Formula Renault Championship** (**2004**); Eurocup Formula Renault 2.0 (2004); Formula Renault 3.5 Series (2005)	Williams (2011–2013); Lotus F1 (2014–2015)
(Belgium) Jérôme d'Ambrosio	2004, 2010	Eurocup Formula Renault 2.0 (2004); Championnat de France Formula Renault 2.0 (2004); GP2 Series (2010)	Virgin Racing (2011); Lotus F1 (2012)
(Brazil) Lucas di Grassi	2005–2007	Formula 3 Euro Series (2005); GP2 Series (2006–2007)	Virgin Racing (2010)
(United Kingdom) Ben Hanley	2006–2008	Formula Renault 3.5 Series (2006–2007); GP2 Series (2008)	None
(Spain) Dani Clos	2007	Formula 3 Euro Series (2007)	None
(France) Nelson Panciatici	2007	Eurocup Formula Renault 2.0 (2007); Championnat de France Formula Renault 2.0 (2007)	None
(France) Charles Pic	2009	Formula Renault 3.5 Series (2009)	Marussia (2012); Caterham (2013)
(Denmark) Marco Sørensen	2009	Eurocup Formula Renault 2.0 (2009); Formula Renault 2.0 NEC (2009)	None
(Italy) Davide Valsecchi	2009	GP2 Series (2009)	None
(Czech Republic) Jan Charouz	2010–2011	Formula Renault 3.5 Series (2010–11); Auto GP (2011)	None
(China) Ho-Pin Tung	2010–2011	GP2 Series (2010); Superleague Formula (2011)	None
(Malaysia) Fairuz Fauzy	2011	GP2 Series (2011)	None

- Championship titles highlighted in **bold**.

=== Lotus F1 (2012–2015) ===
Driver	Years	Series competed	F1 Team(s)
(Estonia) Kevin Korjus	2012	Formula Renault 3.5 Series (2012)	None
(New Zealand) Richie Stanaway	2012	Formula Renault 3.5 Series (2012)	None
(Colombia) Óscar Tunjo	2012–2014	Eurocup Formula Renault 2.0 (2012–2013); Formula Renault 2.0 Alps (2012); Formula Renault 2.0 NEC (2013); Formula Renault 3.5 Series (2014); GP3 Series (2015)	None
(France) Esteban Ocon	2012–2014	Eurocup Formula Renault 2.0 (2012–2013); Formula Renault 2.0 Alps (2012); Formula Renault 2.0 NEC (2013); **FIA Formula 3 European Championship** (**2014**); Formula Renault 3.5 Series (2014)	Manor (2016); Force India (2017–2018); Racing Point Force India (2018); Renault (2020); Alpine (2021–2024); Haas (2025–2026)
(France) Dorian Boccolacci	2012–2015	Karting (2012–13); French F4 Championship (2014); FIA Formula 3 European Championship (2015)	None
(Switzerland) Alex Fontana	2013–2014	GP3 Series (2013–2014)	None
(Denmark) Marco Sørensen	2013–2015	Formula Renault 3.5 Series (2013–2014); GP2 Series (2014–2015); FIA World Endurance Championship (2015)	None
(Thailand) Alexander Albon	2013–2015	Eurocup Formula Renault 2.0 (2013–2014); Formula Renault 2.0 NEC (2013–2014); FIA Formula 3 European Championship (2015)	Toro Rosso (2019); Red Bull (2019–2020); Williams (2022–)
(Philippines) Marlon Stöckinger	2013–2015	Formula Renault 3.5 Series (2013–2015); GP2 Series (2015)	None
(South Africa) Callan O'Keeffe	2014	Eurocup Formula Renault 2.0 (2014); Formula Renault 2.0 NEC (2014)	None
(United Kingdom) Gregor Ramsay	2014	Eurocup Formula Renault 2.0 (2014); Formula Renault 2.0 NEC (2014)	None
(United States) Juan Manuel Correa	2014–2015	Karting (2014–2015)	None
(France) Matthieu Vaxivière	2015	Formula Renault 3.5 Series (2015); Formula Renault 2.0 Alps (2015)	None
(Czech Republic) Petr Ptáček	2015	Karting (2015)	None

=== Renault Sport (2016–2020) ===
Driver	Years	Series competed	F1 Team(s)
(Switzerland) Louis Delétraz	2016	GP2 Series (2016); Formula V8 3.5 Series (2016)	None
(Switzerland) Kevin Jörg	2016	GP3 Series (2016)	None
(United Kingdom) Oliver Rowland	2016	GP2 Series (2016)	None
(United Kingdom) Jack Aitken	2016–2018	GP3 Series (2016–17); FIA Formula 2 Championship (2018)	Williams (2020)
(China) Sun Yueyang	2016–2018	Karting (2016); Formula Renault Eurocup (2017); Formula Renault NEC (2017); BRDC British Formula 3 Championship (2018)	None
(Spain) Marta García	2017	Spanish F4 Championship (2017); SMP F4 Championship (2017)	None
(Netherlands) Jarno Opmeer	2017	Formula Renault Eurocup (2017)	None
(United Kingdom) Max Fewtrell	2017–2020	**Formula Renault Eurocup** (2017–**2018**); Formula Renault NEC (2017–18); FIA Formula 3 Championship (2019–20)	None
(Denmark) Christian Lundgaard	2017–2020	**SMP F4 Championship** (**2017**); **F4 Spanish Championship** (**2017**); Formula Renault Eurocup (2018); FIA Formula 3 Championship (2019); FIA Formula 2 Championship (2020)	None
(France) Sacha Fenestraz	2018	FIA Formula 3 European Championship (2018); GP3 Series (2018)	None
(France) Arthur Rougier	2018	Formula Renault Eurocup (2018)	None
(France) Anthoine Hubert	2018–2019	FIA Formula 2 Championship (2019) (Note: Hubert was a member of the Renault Sport Academy when he suffered a fatal crash in the 2019 Belgian F2 Feature Race.)	None
(France) Victor Martins	2018–2019	Formula Renault Eurocup (2018–2019)	None
(Italy) Leonardo Lorandi	2019	Formula Renault Eurocup (2019)	None
(China) Yifei Ye	2019	FIA Formula 3 Championship (2019)	None
(Brazil) Caio Collet	2019–2020	Formula Renault Eurocup (2019–2020)	None
(China) Guanyu Zhou	2019–2020	FIA Formula 2 Championship (2019–2020)	Alfa Romeo (2022–2023); Kick Sauber (2024)
(France) Hadrien David	2020	Formula Renault Eurocup (2020)	None
(Australia) Oscar Piastri	2020	**FIA Formula 3 Championship** (**2020**)	McLaren (2023–)

- Championship titles highlighted in **bold**.

=== Alpine F1 (2021–) ===
Driver	Years	Series competed	F1 Team(s)
(Denmark) Christian Lundgaard	2021	FIA Formula 2 Championship (2021); IndyCar Series (2021)	None
(China) Guanyu Zhou	2021	FIA Formula 2 Championship (2021); **F3 Asian Championship** (**2021**)	Alfa Romeo (2022–2023); Kick Sauber (2024)
(Brazil) Caio Collet	2021–2022	FIA Formula 3 Championship (2021–2022)	None
(Australia) Oscar Piastri	2021–2022	**FIA Formula 2 Championship** (**2021**)	McLaren (2023–)
(France) Victor Martins	2021–2024	**FIA Formula 3 Championship** (2021–**2022**); FIA Formula 2 Championship (2023–2024)	None
(United Kingdom) Olli Caldwell	2022	FIA Formula 2 Championship (2022)	None
(France) Hadrien David	2022	Formula Regional European Championship (2022)	None
(Brazil) Matheus Ferreira	2022–2023	Italian F4 Championship (2023); F4 Brazilian Championship (2023)	None
(Japan) Kean Nakamura-Berta	2022–2024	Karting (2022–2023); Formula 4 UAE Championship (2024); Italian F4 Championship (2024); Euro 4 Championship (2024)	None
(United Kingdom) Abbi Pulling	2022–2024	W Series (2022); **F1 Academy** (2023–**2024**); F4 British Championship (2024)	None
(Bulgaria) Nikola Tsolov	2022–2024	**F4 Spanish Championship** (**2022**); FIA Formula 3 Championship (2023–2024)	None
(United Kingdom) Aiden Neate	2023	Formula Regional Middle East Championship (2023); F4 British Championship (2023)	None
(Germany) Sophia Flörsch	2023–2024	FIA Formula 3 Championship (2023–2024)	None
(Italy) Nicola Lacorte	2024–2025	Formula Regional Oceania Championship (2024); Formula Regional European Championship (2024); FIA Formula 3 Championship (2025)	None

- Championship titles highlighted in **bold**.

=== Rac(H)er Karting Programme ===
Driver	Years	Series competed
(Switzerland) Chiara Bättig	2023	OK Junior Switzerland
(Australia) Aiva Anagnostiadis	2023–2024	Australian Kart Championship; Rotax Winter Cup; IAME Euro Serie
(France) Lisa Billard	2023–2024	South Garda Winter Cup - OKJ; WSK Super Master Series - OKJ; Championnat de France - Nationale; Champions of the Future - OKJ; CIK-FIA Academy Trophy
(United Kingdom) Sukhmani Khera	2023–2024	British Kart Championships
(Italy) Mariachiara Nardelli	2023–2024	Italian ACI Karting Championship
(France) Angélina Proenca	2023–2024	IAME Euro Series

== See also ==
- Alpine F1 Team
