= 2012 Formula BMW Talent Cup =

Seasons
- ← 2011 2013 →

The 2012 Formula BMW Talent Cup was the second Formula BMW Talent Cup season. The series champion received €297,500 sponsorship for 2013 in a higher-level single-seater racing series.

== Drivers ==
No	Driver
2	(Estonia) Tristan Viidas
3	(Switzerland) Louis Delétraz
4	(Mexico) Alfonso Celis Jr.
5	(Switzerland) Ralph Boschung
6	(Belgium) Pieter-Jan-Michiel Cracco
8	(Romania) Mihnea Ștefan
9	(Germany) Fabian Schiller
10	(Switzerland) Hugo de Sadeleer
11	(Poland) Gosia Rdest
12	(Italy) Gianmarco Ercoli
14	(South Africa) Callan O'Keeffe
15	(Germany) Marvin Dienst
16	(Netherlands) Julien van Loon
17	(Austria) Lukas Jäger
19	(Germany) Marco Läsch

== Race calendar ==
Round		Circuit	Date	Pole position	Winning driver
1		(Sweden) Sturup Raceway, Svedala	5 May	(South Africa) Callan O'Keeffe	(South Africa) Callan O'Keeffe
2	R1	(Spain) Circuit Ricardo Tormo, Valencia	3 June	(South Africa) Callan O'Keeffe	(South Africa) Callan O'Keeffe
2	R2	(Spain) Circuit Ricardo Tormo, Valencia	3 June	(South Africa) Callan O'Keeffe	(Estonia) Tristan Viidas
2	R3	(Spain) Circuit Ricardo Tormo, Valencia	3 June	(South Africa) Callan O'Keeffe	(South Africa) Callan O'Keeffe
3	R1	(France) Circuit de Nevers Magny-Cours	11 July	(South Africa) Callan O'Keeffe	(South Africa) Callan O'Keeffe
3	R2	(France) Circuit de Nevers Magny-Cours	11 July	(Estonia) Tristan Viidas	(Estonia) Tristan Viidas
4	R1	(Hungary) Hungaroring, Budapest	12 August	(Austria) Lukas Jäger	(Germany) Marvin Dienst
4	R2	(Hungary) Hungaroring, Budapest	12 August	(Switzerland) Ralph Boschung	(Switzerland) Ralph Boschung
Grand Final
5	R1	(Germany) Motorsport Arena Oschersleben	15–16 September	(Switzerland) Louis Delétraz	(Switzerland) Ralph Boschung
5	R2	(Germany) Motorsport Arena Oschersleben	15–16 September	(Switzerland) Louis Delétraz	(Switzerland) Louis Delétraz
5	R3	(Germany) Motorsport Arena Oschersleben	15–16 September	(Switzerland) Louis Delétraz	(Germany) Marvin Dienst

== Championship standings ==
Pos	Driver	OSC (Germany)			Pts
Grand Final
1	(Germany) Marvin Dienst	9	3	1	42
2	(Estonia) Tristan Viidas	4	2	4	42
3	(Romania) Mihnea Ștefan	2	6	3	41
4	(Switzerland) Louis Delétraz	3	1	Ret	40
5	(Switzerland) Ralph Boschung	1	4	Ret	37
6	(Mexico) Alfonso Celis Jr.	DSQ	7	2	24
7	(Germany) Fabian Schiller	5	8	6	22
8	(Switzerland) Hugo de Sadeleer	6	9	8	14
9	(South Africa) Callan O'Keeffe	10	5	9	13
10	(Poland) Małgorzata Rdest	7	10	7	13
11	(Belgium) Pieter-Jan-Michiel Cracco	Ret	11	5	10
12	(Austria) Lukas Jäger	8	Ret	Ret	4
Pos	Driver	OSC (Germany)			Pts

Colour	Result
Gold	Winner
Silver	Second place
Bronze	Third place
Green	Points classification
Blue	Non-points classification
Blue	Non-classified finish (NC)
Purple	Retired, not classified (Ret)
Red	Did not qualify (DNQ)
Red	Did not pre-qualify (DNPQ)
Black	Disqualified (DSQ)
White	Did not start (DNS)
White	Withdrew (WD)
White	Race cancelled (C)
Blank	Did not practice (DNP)
Blank	Did not arrive (DNA)
Blank	Excluded (EX)
