= Callan O'Keeffe =

South African racing driver

- Nationality: (South Africa) South African
- Born: Callan Jordan O'Keeffe; 9 June 1996 (age 30) Johannesburg, South Africa

Previous series
- 2017 2017 2017 2014–2015, 2019 2014–2016 2013 2012: U.S. F2000 National Championship; British LMP3 Cup; BRDC British Formula 3 Championship; Formula Renault Eurocup; Formula Renault 2.0 Northern European Cup; ADAC Formel Masters; Formula BMW Talent Cup

Callan Jordan O'Keeffe (born 9 June 1996) is a South African former racing driver, driver coach and founder of the School Of Send. He is a former member of both the Red Bull Junior Team and the Lotus F1 Junior Team.

== Racing career ==
=== Karting ===
O'Keeffe started karting at the age of 13. In 2010, he finished third in the KF3 CIK-FIA World Cup. In 2011, O'Keefe won the British Karting Junior Championship in and was the runner-up in the KF3 CIK-FIA World Cup.

=== Lower formulae ===
O'Keeffe began his career in single-seater racing cars in 2012 with the Formula BMW Talent Cup. He won four races during the regular season. In the Grand Final, he only finished in ninth with 13 points.

In 2013, O'Keeffe competed in the ADAC Formel Masters for Lotus. He finished the season in thirteenth.

=== Formula Renault ===
For the 2014 season, O'Keeffe signed a contract with the ART Junior Team to start in the Eurocup Formula Renault 2.0 and the Formula Renault 2.0 Northern European Cup. Later in the season, he switched his team driver for KTR alongside fellow Lotus F1 juniors Alex Albon and Gregor Ramsay. He took his first Formula Renault race win in the Northern European Cup at TT Circuit Assen. after also scoring his first pole position. At the end of the season, he had scored one win and was on the podium three times. He was seventh in the drivers' standings with 187 points. In the Eurocup, he collected a total of 28 points and finished sixteenth in the final drivers' standings.

In 2015, O'Keeffe joined Fortec Motorsports to compete in both the Eurocup Formula Renault 2.0 and the Formula Renault 2.0 Northern European Cup. In the Northern European Cup, he scored three podiums and finished the season in seventh. In the Eurocup, he only finished in fourteenth after leaving the series ahead of the final two rounds.

In 2016, O'Keeffe only competed in one round of the Formula Renault 2.0 Northern European Cup for JD Motorsport.

In 2019, O'Keeffe he returned to the Formula Renault Eurocup with FA Racing by Drivex. Ahead of the fifth round at Circuit de Spa-Francorchamps he moved to M2 Competition. He finished the season in seventeenth.

=== BRDC British Formula 3 Championship ===
In 2016, O'Keeffe competed in the BRDC British Formula 3 Autumn Trophy for Fortec Motorsport, where he finished third.

In 2017, O'Keeffe joined Douglas Motorsport for a full season in the BRDC British Formula 3 Championship. He scored three podiums and finished the season in sixth.

=== British LMP3 Cup ===
In 2017, O'Keeffe also made his debut in sports car racing by competing in some events of the 2017 British LMP3 Cup together with his team Douglas Motorsport.

=== U.S. F2000 National Championship ===
In 2017, O'Keeffe also competed in selected races of the U.S. F2000 National Championship.

=== Formula One ===
In 2012, O'Keeffe was signed by the Red Bull Junior Team. He was dropped by Red Bull after the 2013 season. He then joined the Lotus F1 Junior Team in 2014. He parted ways with Lotus F1 prior to the 2015 season.

== School Of Send ==
After retiring from racing in 2019, O'Keeffe founded the driver development program School Of Send. The program offers simulator training, in-car tuition, online coaching and trackside support for its drivers. The programs current drivers include Matthew Rees, Hunter Yeany, Rui Andrade, Max Cuthbert and Sonny Smith. In 2021, Matthew Rees became the F4 British Championship champion with O'Keeffe as head coach.

== Personal life ==
As of 2019, O'Keeffe resides near St Albans, England.

== Racing record ==
=== Racing career summary ===
Season	Series	Team	Races	Wins	Poles	F/Laps	Podiums	Points	Position
2012	Formula BMW Talent Cup	N/A	14	4	6	4	9	13	9th
2013	ADAC Formel Masters	Lotus	24	0	0	1	0	34	13th
2014	Eurocup Formula Renault 2.0	ART Junior Team	10	0	0	1	0	28	16th
2014	Eurocup Formula Renault 2.0	KTR	4	0	0	0	0	28	16th
2014	Formula Renault 2.0 NEC	ART Junior Team	13	1	1	3	3	187	7th
2014	Formula Renault 2.0 NEC	KTR	2	0	0	0	0	187	7th
2015	Eurocup Formula Renault 2.0	Fortec Motorsports	12	0	0	0	0	31	14th
2015	Formula Renault 2.0 NEC	Fortec Motorsports	11	0	0	0	3	168.5	7th
2016	Formula Renault 2.0 NEC	JD Motorsport	2	0	0	0	0	14	28th
2016	BRDC British Formula 3 Autumn Trophy	Fortec Motorsport	3	0	0	0	0	61	**3rd**
2017	BRDC British Formula 3 Championship	Douglas Motorsport	24	0	0	0	3	373	6th
2017	British LMP3 Cup	Douglas Motorsport	3	0	0	2	2	0	NC†
2017	U.S. F2000 National Championship	Team BENIK	3	0	0	0	0	27	27th
2019	Formula Renault Eurocup	FA Racing by Drivex	8	0	0	0	0	15	17th
2019	Formula Renault Eurocup	M2 Competition	2	0	0	0	0	15	17th

† O'Keeffe was ineligible to score points.

=== Complete Eurocup Formula Renault 2.0 results ===
(key) (Races in bold indicate pole position; races in italics indicate fastest lap)

Year	Entrant	1	2	3	4	5	6	7	8	9	10	11	12	13	14	15	16	17	18	19	20	DC	Points
2014	ART Junior Team	ALC; 1 Ret	ALC; 2 Ret	SPA; 1; 13	SPA; 2; 4	MSC; 1; 5	MSC; 2; 10	NÜR; 1; 28	NÜR; 2 Ret	HUN; 1 DSQ	HUN; 2; 20											16th	28
2014	KTR											LEC; 1; 22	LEC; 2; 15	JER; 1; 10	JER; 2; 11							16th	28
2015	Fortec Motorsports	ALC; 1 Ret	ALC; 2; 12	ALC; 3; 4	SPA; 1; 7	SPA; 2; 9	HUN; 1; 12	HUN; 2 Ret	SIL; 1; 8	SIL; 2; 10	SIL; 3; 7	NÜR; 1; 15	NÜR; 2; 13	LMS; 1	LMS; 2	JER; 1	JER; 2	JER; 3				14th	31
2019	FA Racing by Drivex	MNZ; 1; 11	MNZ; 2 Ret	SIL; 1; 8	SIL; 2; 8	MON; 1; 8	MON; 2; 9	LEC; 1; 11	LEC; 2; 13													17th	15
2019	M2 Competition									SPA; 1 Ret	SPA; 2; 10	NÜR; 1	NÜR; 2	HUN; 1	HUN; 2	CAT; 1	CAT; 2	HOC; 1	HOC; 2	YMC; 1	YMC; 2	17th	15

=== Complete Formula Renault 2.0 NEC results ===
(key) (Races in bold indicate pole position) (Races in italics indicate fastest lap)

Year	Entrant	1	2	3	4	5	6	7	8	9	10	11	12	13	14	15	16	17	DC	Points
2014	ART Junior Team	MNZ; 1 Ret	MNZ; 2; 25	SIL; 1; 8	SIL; 2; 2	HOC; 1; 5	HOC; 2; 4	HOC; 3; 2	SPA; 1 Ret	SPA; 2; 14	**ASS**; **1**; 1	ASS; 2; 8	MST; 1; 9	MST; 2; 5	MST; 3 C	NÜR; 1; 16			7th	187
2014	KTR																NÜR; 2; 11	NÜR; 3 C	7th	187
2015	Fortec Motorsports	MNZ; 1; 5	MNZ; 2; 21†	SIL; 1; 3	SIL; 2; 5	RBR; 1; 4	RBR; 2; 6	RBR; 3; 4	SPA; 1; 3	SPA; 2; 8	ASS; 1; 4	ASS; 2; 2	NÜR; 1	NÜR; 2	HOC; 1	HOC; 2	HOC; 3		7th	168.5
2016	JD Motorsports	MNZ; 1	MNZ; 2	SIL; 1; 23	SIL; 2; 7	HUN; 1	HUN; 2	SPA; 1	SPA; 2	ASS; 1	ASS; 2	NÜR; 1	NÜR; 2	HOC; 1	HOC; 2	HOC; 3			28th	14
