= 2015 Formula Renault 2.0 Northern European Cup =

Motor racing championship

2015 Formula Renault 2.0 NEC

Seasons
- ← 2014 2016 →

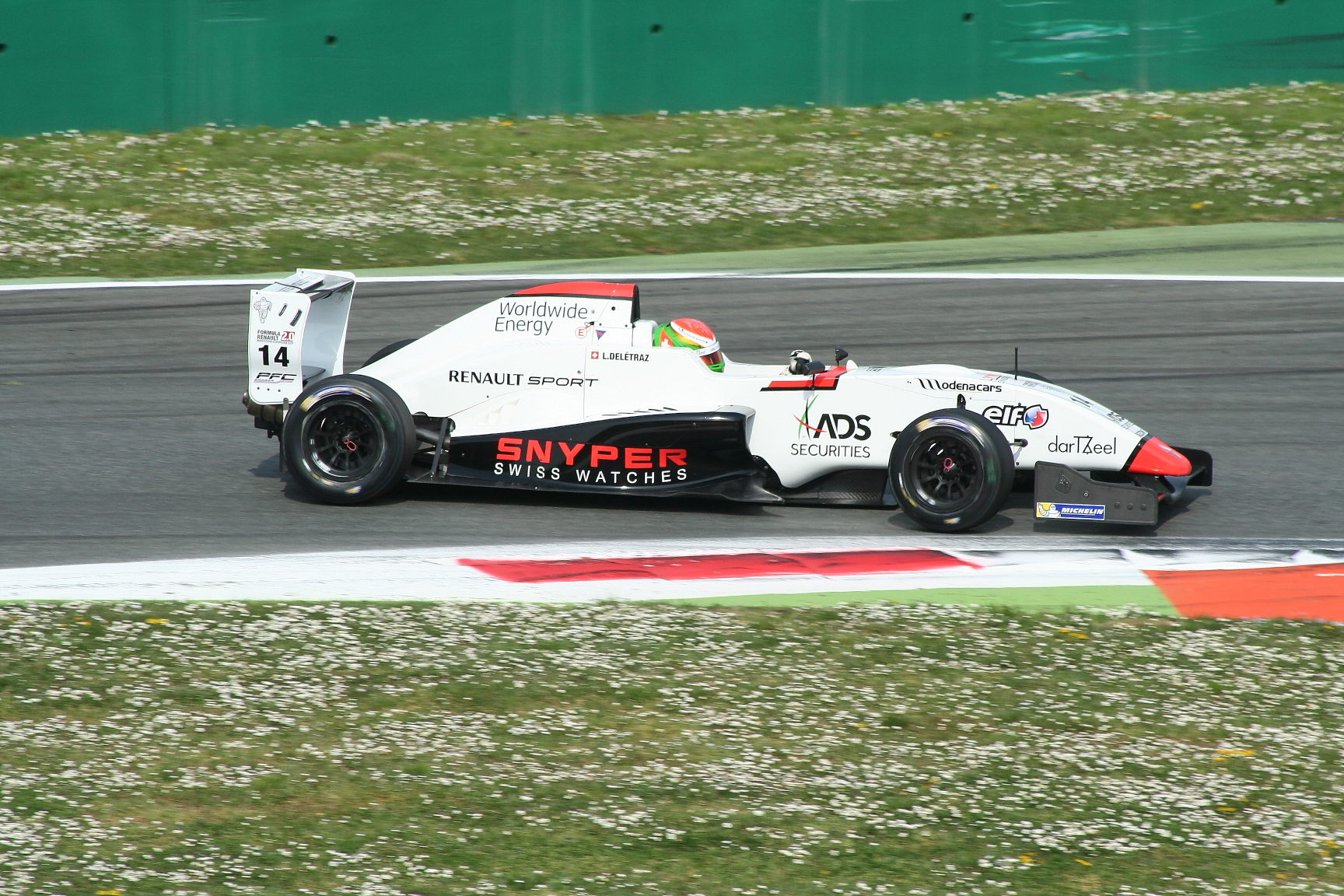
2015 champion, Louis Deletraz

The 2015 Formula Renault 2.0 Northern European Cup was the tenth Formula Renault 2.0 Northern European Cup season, an open-wheel motor racing series for emerging young racing drivers based in Europe.

== Drivers and teams ==
Team	No.	Driver name	Status	Rounds
(United Kingdom) Fortec Motorsports	5	(United Kingdom) Alex Gill	R	All
(United Kingdom) Fortec Motorsports	6	(India) Jehan Daruvala	R	All
(United Kingdom) Fortec Motorsports	7	(South Africa) Callan O'Keeffe		1–5
(United Kingdom) Fortec Motorsports	8	(Canada) Luke Chudleigh		1–2
(United Kingdom) Fortec Motorsports	13	(Canada) Zachary Claman DeMelo	R	1–2
(United Kingdom) Fortec Motorsports	31	(Republic of Ireland) Charlie Eastwood		2
(United Kingdom) Fortec Motorsports	36	(Austria) Stefan Riener		6–7
(United Kingdom) Fortec Motorsports	62	(Austria) Ferdinand Habsburg	R	1–5
(France) ART Junior Team	9	(Japan) Ukyo Sasahara		All
(France) ART Junior Team	10	(Switzerland) Darius Oskoui	R	All
(France) ART Junior Team	33	(Belgium) Max Defourny	R	2–7
(Sweden) Prizma Motorsport	11	(Sweden) Pontus Fredricsson	R	All
(Sweden) Prizma Motorsport	12	(Sweden) Kevin Kleveros		4–5
(Germany) Josef Kaufmann Racing	14	(Switzerland) Louis Delétraz		All
(Germany) Josef Kaufmann Racing	15	(Switzerland) Kevin Jörg		All
(Germany) Josef Kaufmann Racing	16	(Russia) Nikita Mazepin	R	All
(Germany) Josef Kaufmann Racing	28	(Belgium) Dries Vanthoor	R	All
(Netherlands) Manor MP Motorsport	17	(Norway) Dennis Olsen		1–2, 5
(Netherlands) Manor MP Motorsport	18	(Denmark) Lasse Sørensen		1
(Netherlands) Manor MP Motorsport	19	(Italy) Ignazio D'Agosto		1–2
(Netherlands) Manor MP Motorsport	46	(Australia) Christopher Anthony		5
(Spain) AVF	20	(Czech Republic) Josef Záruba		All
(Spain) AVF	21	(Portugal) Henrique Chaves		All
(Spain) AVF	22	(Netherlands) Roy Geerts		1
(Spain) AVF	23	(Spain) Iñigo Bikuña	R	1, 4–5
(Spain) AVF	31	(Republic of Ireland) Charlie Eastwood		3–5
(Spain) AVF	39	(United Kingdom) Harrison Scott		2, 5
(Spain) AVF	40	(Czech Republic) Bronislav Formánek		1
(Spain) AVF	42	(Japan) Nobuharu Matsushita		3
(Spain) AVF	58	(Russia) Denis Bulatov	R	7
(Sweden) Fragus BR Motorsport	24	(Sweden) Robin Hansson		1–2
(Sweden) Fragus BR Motorsport	25	(Sweden) Oliver Söderström	R	1
(Poland) Inter Europol	26	(Canada) David Richert		All
(Poland) Inter Europol	29	(Spain) Álex Palou		3
(Poland) Inter Europol	35	(Brazil) Bruno Baptista		5
(United Kingdom) Mark Burdett Motorsport	27	(Malaysia) Rahul Raj Mayer		1–4
(United Kingdom) Mark Burdett Motorsport	97	(Switzerland) David Droux	R	7
(United Kingdom) Strakka Racing	31	(Republic of Ireland) Charlie Eastwood		1
(United Kingdom) Strakka Racing	32	(France) Valentin Hasse-Clot		1
(United Kingdom) Strakka Racing	33	(Belgium) Max Defourny	R	1
(Finland) Koiranen GP	34	(United Kingdom) Dan Ticktum	R	4, 6
(Finland) Koiranen GP	35	(Germany) Philip Hamprecht		4
(Finland) Koiranen GP	35	(Brazil) Bruno Baptista		6–7
(Finland) Koiranen GP	36	(Austria) Stefan Riener		4
(Finland) Koiranen GP	37	(Brazil) Bruno Baptista		4
(United Kingdom) MGR Motorsport	45	(United Kingdom) Colin Noble		All
(United Kingdom) MGR Motorsport	51	(India) Ameya Vaidyanathan		6
(Finland) PositiOne Motorsport	49	(Finland) Mikko Perttala		6–7
(Finland) PositiOne Motorsport	50	(Finland) Harri Salminen		6–7
(Italy) TS Corse	73	(Italy) Pietro Peccenini		4, 6
(Poland) BM Racing Team	96	(Poland) Bartłomiej Mirecki		All

== Race calendar and results ==
The seven-event provisional calendar for the 2015 season was released on 19 November 2014.

Round		Circuit	Date	Pole position	Fastest lap	Winning driver	Winning team	Event
1	R1	(Italy) Autodromo Nazionale Monza	11 April	(Switzerland) Louis Delétraz	(Switzerland) Louis Delétraz	(Japan) Ukyo Sasahara	(France) ART Junior Team	Blancpain Endurance Series
1	R2	(Italy) Autodromo Nazionale Monza	12 April	(Switzerland) Louis Delétraz	(Switzerland) Louis Delétraz	(Switzerland) Louis Delétraz	(Germany) Josef Kaufmann Racing	Blancpain Endurance Series
2	R1	(United Kingdom) Silverstone Circuit	23 May	(Switzerland) Louis Delétraz	(Japan) Ukyo Sasahara	(Switzerland) Louis Delétraz	(Germany) Josef Kaufmann Racing	Blancpain Endurance Series
2	R2	(United Kingdom) Silverstone Circuit	24 May	(Switzerland) Louis Delétraz	(Switzerland) Louis Delétraz	(Switzerland) Louis Delétraz	(Germany) Josef Kaufmann Racing	Blancpain Endurance Series
3	R1	(Austria) Red Bull Ring	6 June	(Switzerland) Louis Delétraz	(Switzerland) Louis Delétraz	(Switzerland) Kevin Jörg	(Germany) Josef Kaufmann Racing	ADAC GT Masters
3	R2	(Austria) Red Bull Ring	7 June	(Switzerland) Kevin Jörg	(Switzerland) Louis Delétraz	(Switzerland) Kevin Jörg	(Germany) Josef Kaufmann Racing	ADAC GT Masters
3	R3	(Austria) Red Bull Ring	7 June	(Switzerland) Louis Delétraz	(Switzerland) Kevin Jörg	(Switzerland) Louis Delétraz	(Germany) Josef Kaufmann Racing	ADAC GT Masters
4	R1	(Belgium) Circuit de Spa-Francorchamps	24 July	(Belgium) Max Defourny	(Belgium) Max Defourny	(Belgium) Max Defourny	(France) ART Junior Team	Blancpain Endurance Series
4	R2	(Belgium) Circuit de Spa-Francorchamps	25 July	(Switzerland) Louis Delétraz	(Sweden) Pontus Fredricsson	(Switzerland) Louis Delétraz	(Germany) Josef Kaufmann Racing	Blancpain Endurance Series
5	R1	(Netherlands) TT Circuit Assen	1 August	(Switzerland) Kevin Jörg	(Switzerland) Kevin Jörg	(Belgium) Dries Vanthoor	(Germany) Josef Kaufmann Racing	Gamma Racing Day
5	R2	(Netherlands) TT Circuit Assen	2 August	(Switzerland) Louis Delétraz	(India) Jehan Daruvala	(Switzerland) Louis Delétraz	(Germany) Josef Kaufmann Racing	Gamma Racing Day
6	R1	(Germany) Nürburgring	19 September	(Japan) Ukyo Sasahara	(Switzerland) Louis Delétraz	(Japan) Ukyo Sasahara	(France) ART Junior Team	Blancpain Endurance Series
6	R2	(Germany) Nürburgring	20 September	(Switzerland) Louis Delétraz	(Belgium) Max Defourny	(Belgium) Max Defourny	(France) ART Junior Team	Blancpain Endurance Series
7	R1	(Germany) Hockenheimring	3 October	(Switzerland) Louis Delétraz	(Switzerland) Kevin Jörg	(Switzerland) Louis Delétraz	(Germany) Josef Kaufmann Racing	ADAC GT Masters
7	R2	(Germany) Hockenheimring	4 October	(Switzerland) Louis Delétraz	(Switzerland) Louis Delétraz	(Switzerland) Louis Delétraz	(Germany) Josef Kaufmann Racing	ADAC GT Masters
7	R3	(Germany) Hockenheimring	4 October	(Switzerland) Louis Delétraz	(Switzerland) Louis Delétraz	(Switzerland) Louis Delétraz	(Germany) Josef Kaufmann Racing	ADAC GT Masters

== Championship standings ==
Points system

Points were awarded to the top 20 classified finishers.

Position	**1st**	**2nd**	**3rd**	**4th**	**5th**	**6th**	**7th**	**8th**	**9th**	**10th**	**11th**	**12th**	**13th**	**14th**	**15th**	**16th**	**17th**	**18th**	**19th**	**20th**
Points	30	24	20	17	16	15	14	13	12	11	10	9	8	7	6	5	4	3	2	1

=== Drivers' championship ===
The second race at Spa-Francorchamps was red-flagged after four laps of the race had been completed due to torrential rain. As a result, series organisers awarded half points to each of the classified finishers eligible to score points.

Pos.	Driver	MNZ (Italy)		SIL (United Kingdom)		RBR (Austria)			SPA (Belgium)		ASS (Netherlands)		NÜR (Germany)		HOC (Germany)			Points
Pos.	Driver	1	2	3	4	5	6	7	8	9	10	11	12	13	14	15	16	Points
1	(Switzerland) Louis Delétraz	**14**	**1**	**1**	**1**	**2**	2	**1**	4	**1**	5	**1**	2	**10**	**1**	**1**	**1**	378
2	(Switzerland) Kevin Jörg	23	9	8	3	1	**1**	2	2	3	**3**	4	3	3	4	2	2	305
3	(Japan) Ukyo Sasahara	1	2	2	4	10	18	6	5	5	2	3	**1**	8	2	4	3	296
4	(Belgium) Max Defourny	3	8	Ret	8	8	8	Ret	**1**	2	18	8	6	1	7	9	4	218
5	(India) Jehan Daruvala	8	4	16	15	3	4	Ret	6	6	11	7	5	2	3	Ret	11	194.5
6	(Belgium) Dries Vanthoor	6	Ret	17	9	7	10	Ret	7	9	1	16	10	7	9	3	8	181
7	(South Africa) Callan O'Keeffe	5	21†	3	5	4	6	4	3	8	4	2						168.5
8	(United Kingdom) Alex Gill	16	5	10	11	5	3	9	13	4	Ret	DNS	13	6	Ret	7	Ret	145.5
9	(Switzerland) Darius Oskoui	4	Ret	5	10	Ret	11	11	9	7	7	9	12	Ret	8	Ret	9	143
10	(United Kingdom) Colin Noble	9	Ret	9	12	Ret	9	8	12	12	9	10	20	9	13	10	12	135.5
11	(Czech Republic) Josef Záruba	15	13	12	7	12	7	12	19	14	16	14	9	12	10	6	Ret	133.5
12	(Russia) Nikita Mazepin	10	Ret	14	Ret	9	Ret	3	8	10	12	12	8	13	6	Ret	18	125.5
13	(Portugal) Henrique Chaves	Ret	15	11	17	14	12	10	23	17	14	Ret	15	Ret	11	8	5	101
14	(Norway) Dennis Olsen	7	6	4	2						8	6						98
15	(Sweden) Pontus Fredricsson	Ret	18	21	22	13	13	15	16	16	15	13	11	15	Ret	11	14	79.5
16	(Poland) Bartłomiej Mirecki	20	16	22	21	16	15	14	20	18	17	17	14	11	15	12	10	77.5
17	(Republic of Ireland) Charlie Eastwood	17	20†	13	14	11	5	7	11	22	21	15						76
18	(Austria) Stefan Riener								10	13			4	4	16	17	6	73
19	(Austria) Ferdinand Habsburg	25	Ret	18	16	6	16	5	Ret	23	13	11						62
20	(United Kingdom) Harrison Scott			6	6						6	5						61
21	(Italy) Ignazio D'Agosto	2	Ret	7	13													46
22	(Russia) Denis Bulatov														5	5	7	46
23	(United Kingdom) Dan Ticktum								15	11			7	5				41
24	(Brazil) Bruno Baptista								14	15	23†	18	Ret	14	14	Ret	13	35
25	(Canada) David Richert	22	19	24	23	17	17	16	24	21	22	21	18	19	17	15	16	35
26	(France) Valentin Hasse-Clot	13	3															28
27	(Malaysia) Rahul Raj Mayer	18	Ret	23	20	15	14	13	WD	WD								25
28	(Finland) Harri Salminen												17	17	18	14	15	24
29	(Denmark) Lasse Sørensen	12	7															23
30	(Canada) Zachary Claman DeMelo	11	12	20	19													22
31	(Sweden) Robin Hansson	Ret	11	15	18													19
32	(Switzerland) David Droux														12	13	Ret	17
33	(Sweden) Kevin Kleveros								17	Ret	10	22†						15
34	(Finland) Mikko Perttala												19	20	19	16	17	14
35	(Canada) Luke Chudleigh	26	10	19	Ret													13
36	(India) Ameya Vaidyanathan												16	16				10
37	(Netherlands) Roy Geerts	19	14															9
38	(Spain) Iñigo Bikuña	24	17						21	19	19	19						9
39	(Italy) Pietro Peccenini								22	20			DNS	18				3.5
40	(Germany) Philip Hamprecht								18	DNS								3
41	(Australia) Christopher Anthony										20	20						2
42	(Czech Republic) Bronislav Formánek	21	Ret															0
43	(Sweden) Oliver Söderström	27	Ret															0
	(Spain) Álex Palou					Ret	DNS	DNS										0
	(Japan) Nobuharu Matsushita					PO	PO	PO										0
Pos.	Driver	MNZ (Italy)		SIL (United Kingdom)		RBR (Austria)			SPA (Belgium)		ASS (Netherlands)		NÜR (Germany)		HOC (Germany)			Points

Colour	Result
Gold	Winner
Silver	Second place
Bronze	Third place
Green	Points classification
Blue	Non-points classification
Blue	Non-classified finish (NC)
Purple	Retired, not classified (Ret)
Red	Did not qualify (DNQ)
Red	Did not pre-qualify (DNPQ)
Black	Disqualified (DSQ)
White	Did not start (DNS)
White	Withdrew (WD)
White	Race cancelled (C)
Blank	Did not practice (DNP)
Blank	Did not arrive (DNA)
Blank	Excluded (EX)

**Bold** – Pole
Italics – Fastest Lap

Rookie

† — Drivers did not finish the race, but were classified as they completed over 75% of the race distance.

=== Teams' championship ===
The second race at Spa-Francorchamps was red-flagged after four laps of the race had been completed due to torrential rain. As a result, series organisers awarded half points to each of the classified finishers eligible to score points.

Pos.	Driver	MNZ (Italy)		SIL (United Kingdom)		RBR (Austria)			SPA (Belgium)		ASS (Netherlands)		NÜR (Germany)		HOC (Germany)			Points
1	(Germany) Josef Kaufmann Racing	6	1	1	1	1	1	1	2	1	1	1	2	3	1	1	1	428
2	(France) ART Junior Team	1	2	2	4	8	8	6	1	2	2	3	1	1	2	4	3	301
3	(United Kingdom) Fortec Motorsports	5	4	3	5	3	3	4	3	6	4	2	4	2	3	7	6	285.5
4	(Spain) AVF	15	13	6	6	11	5	7	11	14	6	5	9	12	5	5	5	197.5
5	(United Kingdom) MGR Motorsport	9	Ret	9	12	Ret	9	8	12	12	9	10	16	9	13	10	12	139.5
6	(Netherlands) Manor MP Motorsport	2	6	4	2						8	6						108
7	(Sweden) Prizma Motorsport	Ret	18	21	22	13	13	15	16	16	10	13	11	15	Ret	11	14	84.5
8	(Poland) BM Racing	20	16	22	21	16	15	14	20	18	17	17	14	11	15	12	10	77.5
9	(Finland) Koiranen GP								14	11			7	5	14	Ret	13	61
10	(United Kingdom) Mark Burdett Motorsport	18	Ret	23	20	15	14	13	WD	WD					12	13	Ret	42
11	(United Kingdom) Strakka Racing	3	3															40
12	(Poland) Inter Europol Competition	22	19	24	23	17	17	16	24	21	22	18	18	19	17	15	16	38
13	(Finland) PositiOne Motorsport												17	17	18	14	15	24
14	(Sweden) Fragus BR Motorsport	27	11	15	18													19
15	(Italy) TS Corse								22	20			DNS	18				3.5
Pos.	Driver	MNZ (Italy)		SIL (United Kingdom)		RBR (Austria)			SPA (Belgium)		ASS (Netherlands)		NÜR (Germany)		HOC (Germany)			Points
