= Louis Delétraz =

Swiss racing driver

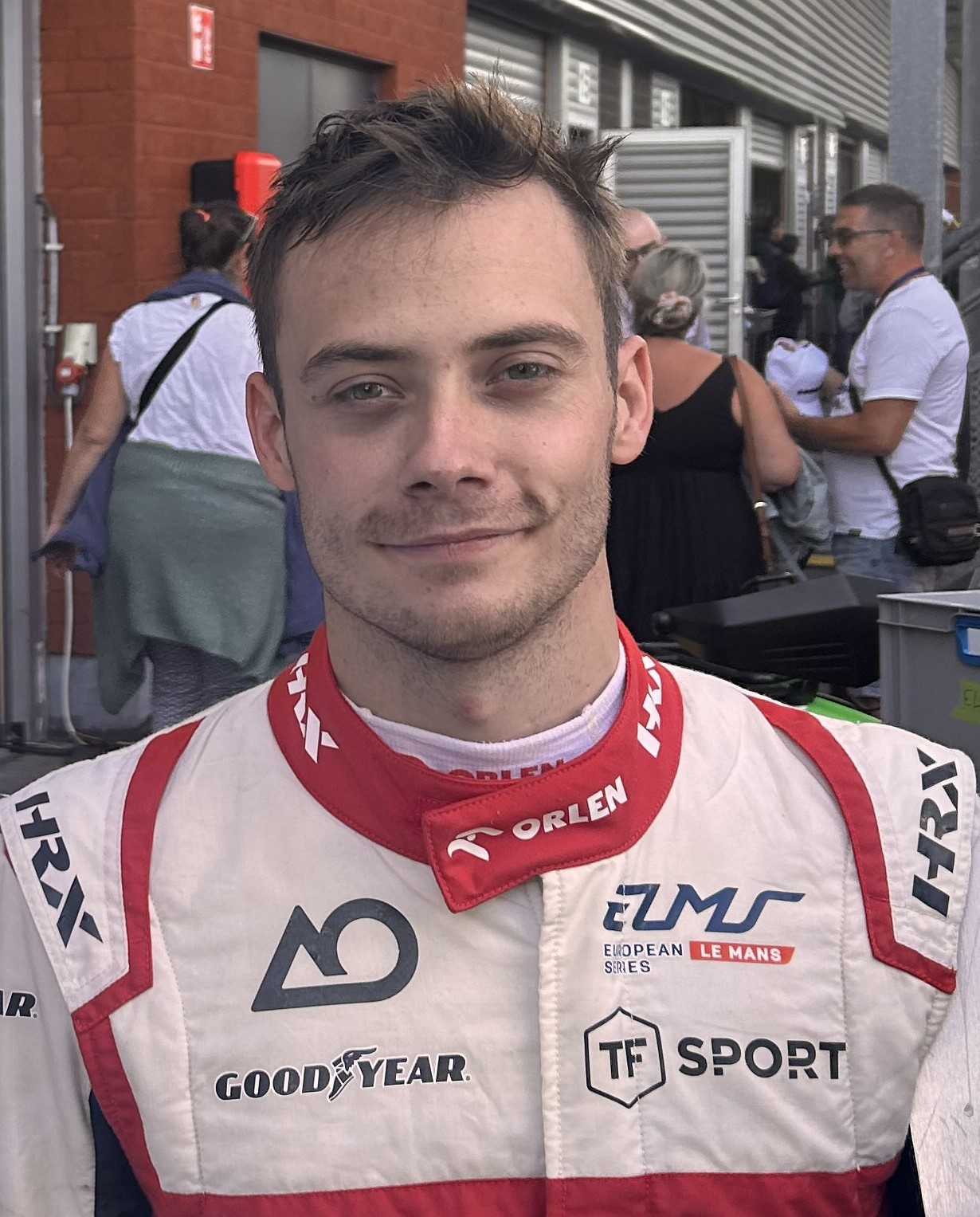
- Delétraz after winning the 2024 4 Hours of Spa
- Nationality: (Switzerland) Swiss
- Born: Louis Charles Hubert Delétraz; 22 April 1997 (age 29) Geneva, Switzerland
- Relatives: Jean-Denis Delétraz (father)

IMSA SportsCar Championship career
- Debut season: 2022
- Current team: Cadillac Wayne Taylor Racing
- Categorisation: FIA Gold
- Car number: 40
- Former teams: AO Racing, Tower Motorsports
- Starts: 41
- Wins: 3
- Podiums: 12
- Poles: 4
- Fastest laps: 4
- Best finish: 5th in 2024

European Le Mans Series career
- Debut season: 2021
- Current team: AO by TF
- Car number: 99
- Former teams: Racing Team Turkey, Prema Racing, Team WRT
- Starts: 30
- Wins: 11
- Podiums: 20
- Poles: 7
- Fastest laps: 3
- Best finish: 1st in 2021, 2022, 2024-2025

Previous series
- 2020 2017–20 2016 2015–16 2014–15 2013–15 2012: GTWC Europe Endurance Cup; FIA Formula 2 Championship; GP2 Series; Formula V8 3.5; Eurocup Formula Renault 2.0; Formula Renault 2.0 NEC; Formula BMW Talent Cup

Championship titles
- 2025 2023 2021–22, 2024 2015: ELMS - LMP2 Pro-Am; FIA WEC - LMP2; ELMS - LMP2; Formula Renault 2.0 NEC

Awards
- 2023: Auto Sport Schweiz Award

Louis Charles Hubert Delétraz (born 22 April 1997) is a Swiss racing driver currently competing in the IMSA SportsCar Championship for Cadillac Wayne Taylor Racing and in the European Le Mans Series for AO by TF.

Delétraz won the Formula Renault Northern European Cup in 2015, as well as being a record-setting four-time champion in the European Le Mans Series. He also won the LMP2 Pro-Am class of the 2025 24 Hours of Le Mans. He is the son of former Formula One and Le Mans 24 Hours class winner Jean-Denis Delétraz.

== Early career ==
=== Soap box racing ===
Delétraz was introduced to racing by his father Jean-Denis, who forbid him from racing karts competitively until he was ten years old. As a result, Delétraz began racing with soap boxes, building them together with his father.

=== Karting ===
Delétraz began karting in his native Switzerland 2008, winning the Vega Trofeo Super Mini class the following year. Third-place finishes followed in the KF3 Bridgestone Cup Switzerland and Vega Trofeo Junior categories in 2010 before winning the latter championship in 2011.

=== Formula BMW Talent Cup ===
Delétraz began his single-seater career in 2012, racing in the Formula BMW Talent Cup. At the Grand Final, held at Motorsport Arena Oschersleben in Germany, he started each of the three races from Pole position, winning the second race of the event. In the final race of the weekend, Delétraz collided with fellow Swiss driver Ralph Boschung with both drivers retiring from the race. He was subsequently excluded from the event following an incident in the pit lane after the race.

=== Formula Renault 2.0 ===
==== 2013 ====
Delétraz graduated to Formula Renault for 2013, racing in the Formula Renault 2.0 NEC championship with Josef Kaufmann Racing. He finished the season in 19th place in the championship, with a best race result of fifth coming in the second race of the Silverstone meeting.

==== 2014 ====
Delétraz continued with the team for a second FR2.0 NEC season in 2014. After winning the opening race of the season at Monza, he took a further four podium positions to finish runner-up in the championship, sixteen points behind Fortec Motorsports Ben Barnicoat. His title charge ended when the season finale at the Nürburgring was cancelled. During the year, Delétraz also made his debut in the Eurocup Formula Renault 2.0 championship, taking part in the rounds at Spa-Francorchamps, Nürburgring and Paul Ricard as a guest driver.

==== 2015 ====
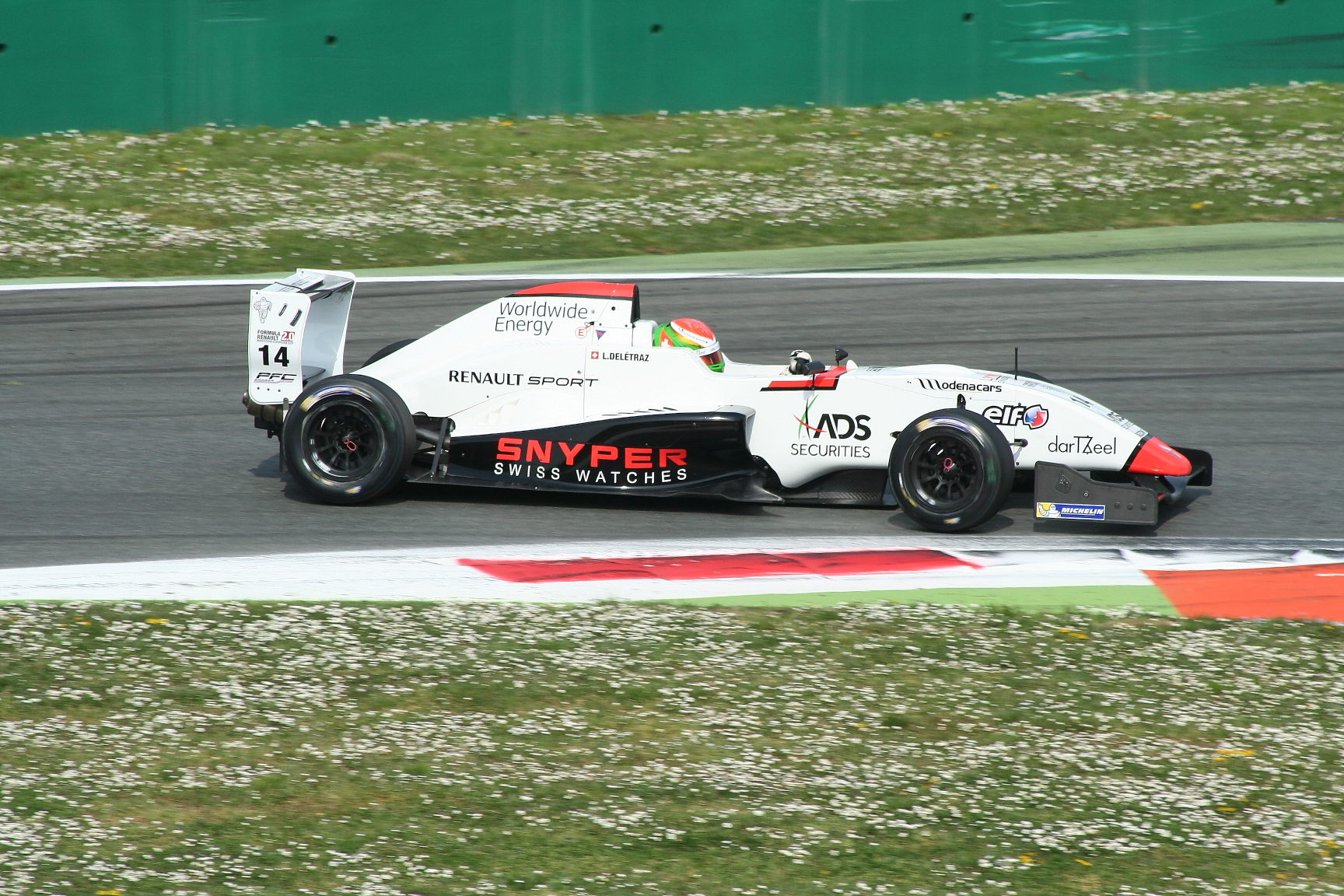
Delétraz racing in the 2015 Eurocup Formula Renault 2.0

In 2015, Delétraz stayed with Josef Kaufmann Racing for a third season, racing a dual campaign in both Eurocup Formula Renault 2.0 and Formula Renault 2.0 NEC. He won the Formula Renault NEC while he finished second in the Eurocup with three victories, narrowly losing the title to Jack Aitken.

In April 2015, Delétraz was announced as one of the four drivers selected to join the BMW Motorsport Junior Programme for 2015. As part of the initiative, he contested three races of the Veranstaltergemeinschaft Langstreckenpokal Nürburgring series (VLN) for the manufacturer.

=== Formula Renault 3.5 Series/Formula V8 3.5 ===
Delétraz made his debut in the Formula Renault 3.5 Series at the fifth round of the 2015 season at the Red Bull Ring, driving for the returning Comtec Racing team.

Delétraz stepped up to the series full-time with Fortec in 2016, being mentored by Formula One driver Romain Grosjean. After winning the season opener at Aragón, Delétraz became embroiled in a title battle with experienced single-seater driver Tom Dillmann. Delétraz took his second and final win of the campaign in round 4 at Le Castellet, using an undercut to go from third to first. The title battle heated up at the penultimate round in Jerez, where Delétraz fell outside the points due to a penalty he received for causing a collision with Dillmann, who retired in the gravel trap. Delétraz took the championship lead in race 2 of the weekend, finishing second after being passed by Egor Orudzhev at the start. In race 1 of the season finale at Barcelona, Delétraz pressured Dillmann into a mistake and passed him to finish second. Delétraz then took pole position for the title decider, but lost four places at the start and got undercut by Dillmann, thereby finishing seven points behind him in the standings.

=== GP2 Series ===
On 18 November 2016, it was announced that Delétraz would make his debut in the final round of the 2016 season with Carlin. He finished 26th in the overall standings with no points.

=== FIA Formula 2 Championship ===
==== 2017 ====
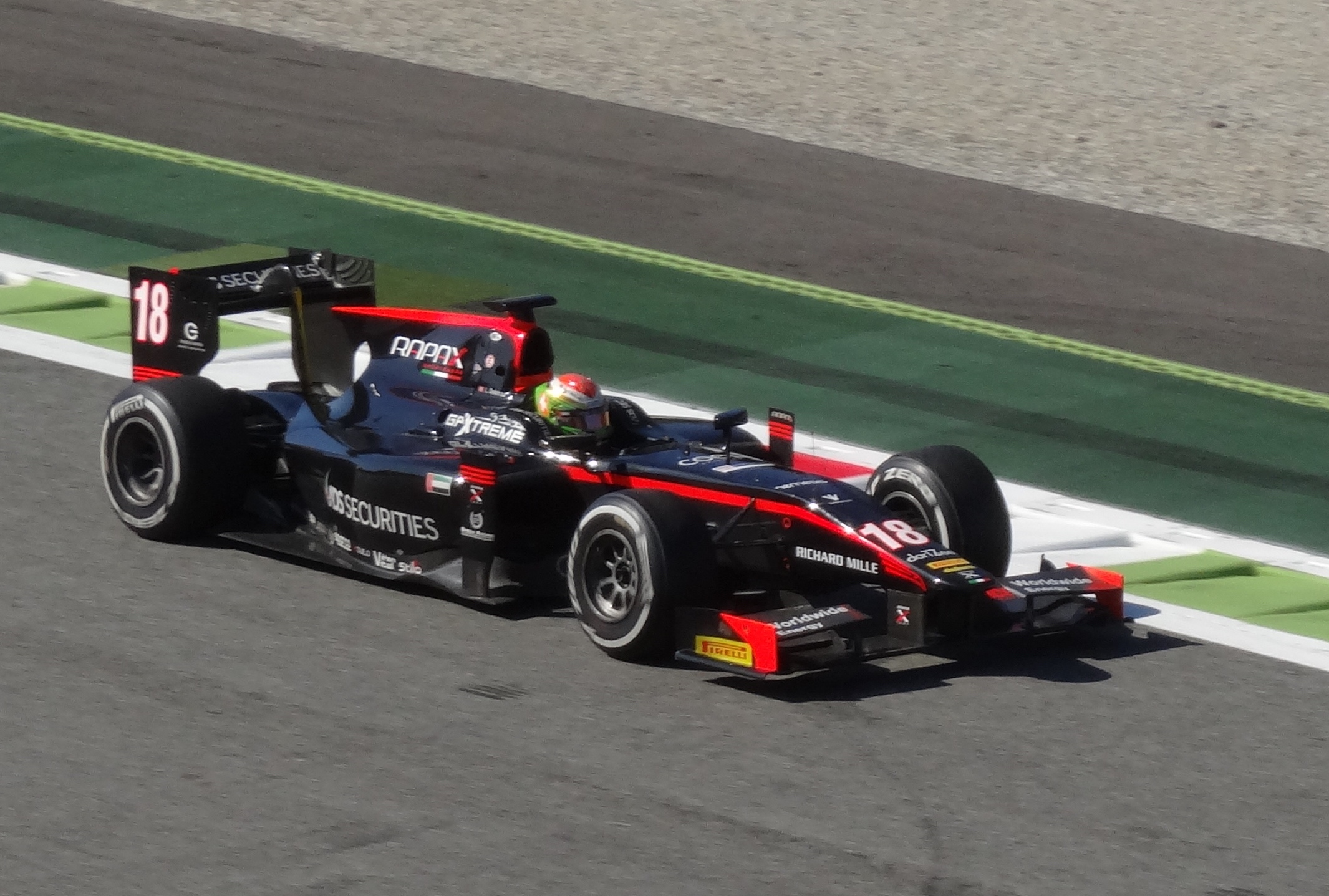
Delétraz at the 2017 Monza Formula 2 round with Rapax

In December 2016, after partaking in post-season testing with them, Delétraz signed to race full-time with Racing Engineering in 2017 alongside Gustav Malja. After a poor first half of the season, scoring only one point, he switched to Rapax, replacing Nyck de Vries who in turn took his place at Racing Engineering. It was later claimed by Sebastian Viger, then Racing Engineering's technical director who later worked with Delétraz at Team WRT, that Delétraz needed time to learn the new category and gain experience. Delétraz finished 17th in the standings.

==== 2018 ====
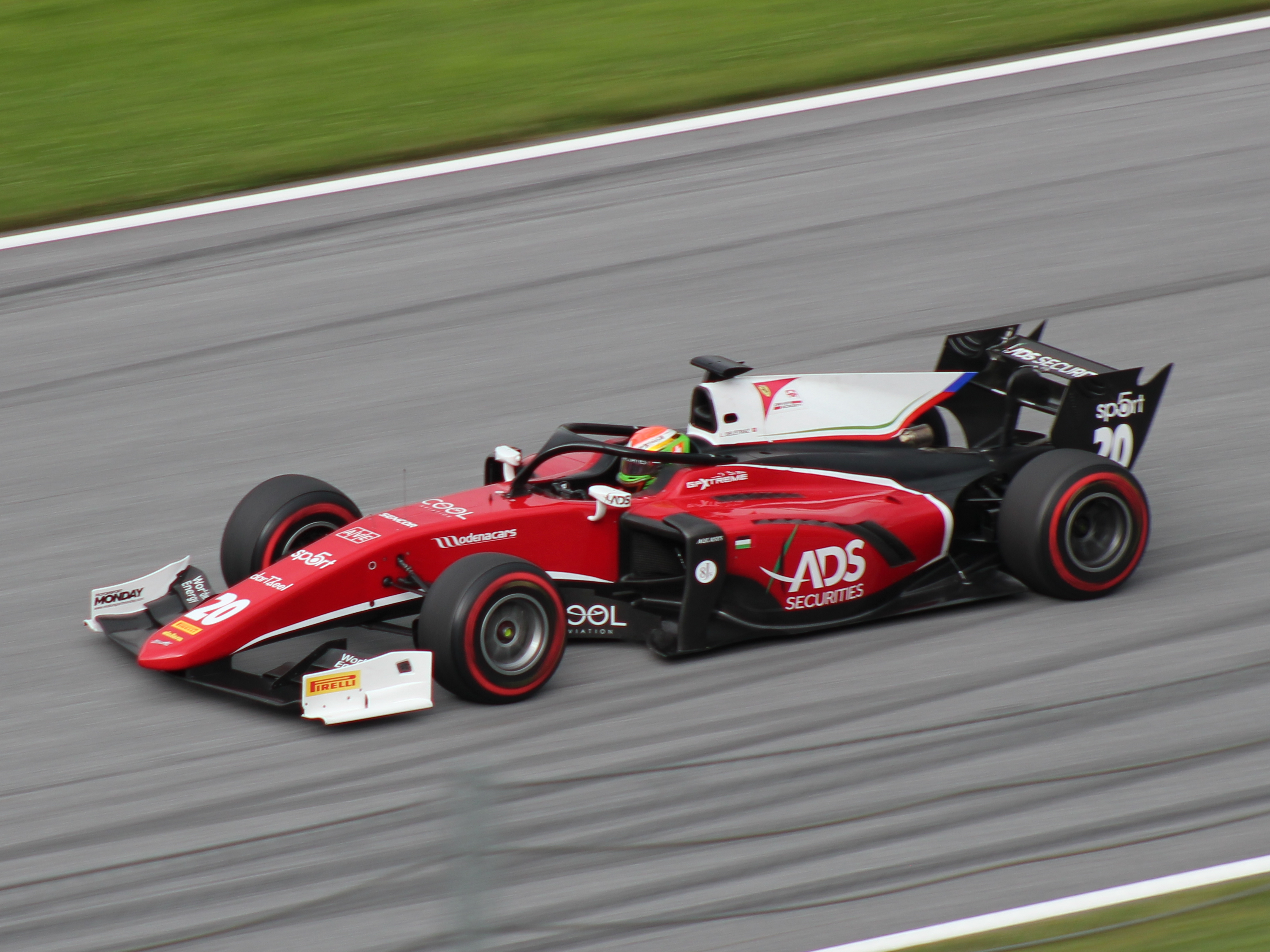
Delétraz at the 2018 Spielberg Formula 2 round with Charouz Racing System

Delétraz switched teams for the 2018 season, moving to Charouz Racing System to partner former Ferrari Driver Academy member Antonio Fuoco. Having scored second places during the sprint races in Monaco and Le Castellet respectively, the Swiss driver ended up tenth in the championship.

==== 2019 ====
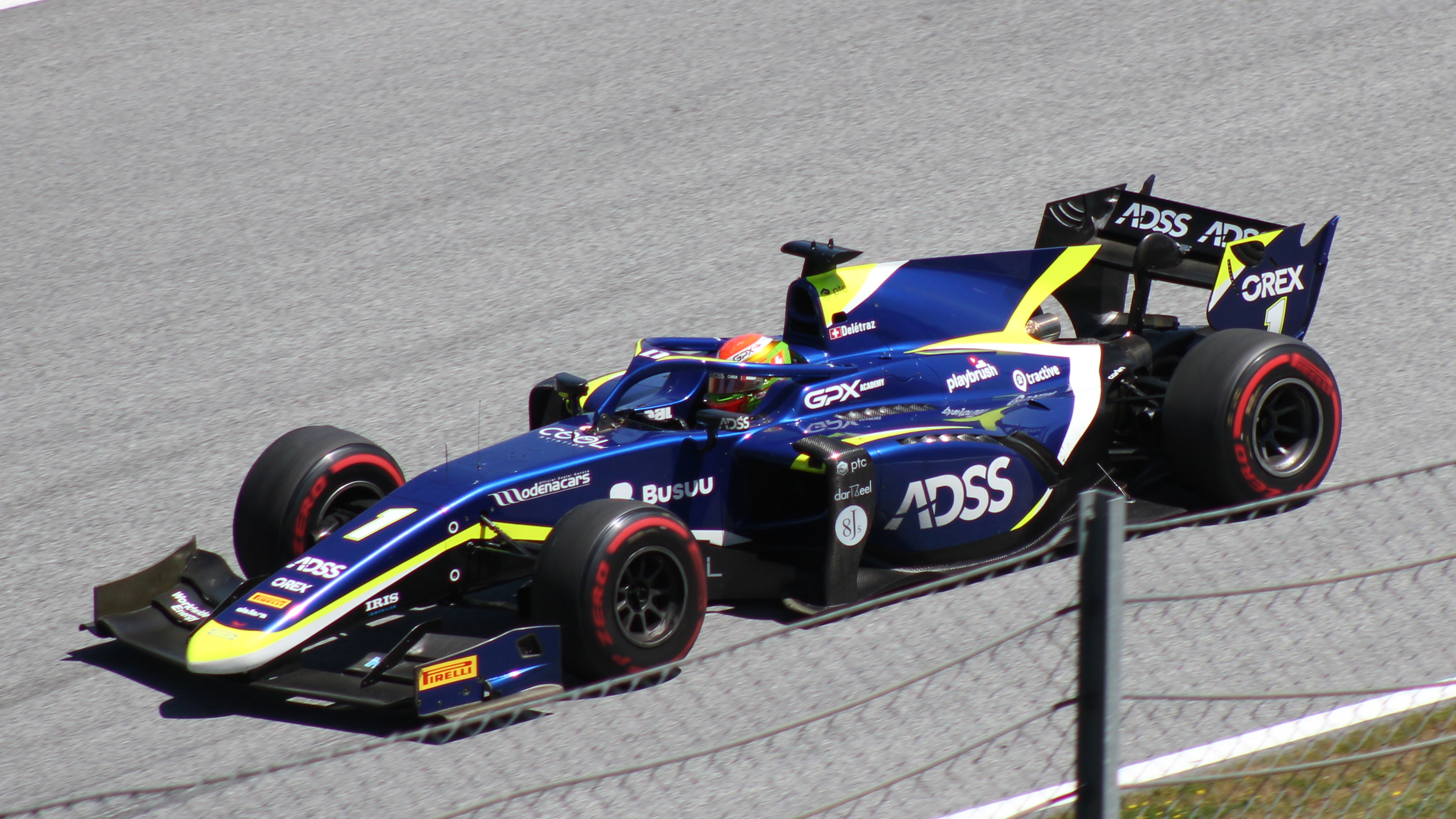
Delétraz at the 2019 Spielberg Formula 2 round with Carlin

In 2019, Delétraz moved to reigning teams champion Carlin with Honda junior driver Nobuharu Matsushita. He finished the season eighth in the standings with a best result of second in both the Monaco and Silverstone sprint races.

==== 2020 ====
For 2020, Delétraz returned to Charouz alongside Pedro Piquet. Having scored five podiums, Delétraz ended his final season in the category eighth overall.

=== Formula One ===
In February 2016, Delétraz was confirmed as a member of Renault's young driver program.

In November 2018, it was announced that Delétraz would make his Formula One test debut with Haas F1 Team at the end-of-year Young Driver Test in Abu Dhabi. He completed 117 laps in the second day of the 2 day test.

In May 2019, it was announced that Delétraz would join Haas F1 Team as simulator driver for the remainder of the 2019 season. Delétraz continued as reserve and development driver for 2020. However, following Romain Grosjean's crash at the 2020 Bahrain Grand Prix, the team preferred to bring in its other development driver, Pietro Fittipaldi. Delétraz criticized this decision on social media. Haas team principal Guenther Steiner brushed off these criticisms, saying Fittipaldi deserved the seat, as he had more Formula One mileage than Delétraz. Delétraz did not continue as a development driver with Haas for 2021.

== Sportscar career ==
=== 2020: Endurance debut ===
Delétraz competed in the 2020 24 Hours of Le Mans Virtual and won it with Rebellion Williams eSports, driving the Oreca 07 in the LMP category alongside Raffaele Marciello, Nikodem Wisniewski and Jakub Brzezinski. In the same year, Deletraz also competed in the 24 Hours of Le Mans with the Swiss outift Rebellion Racing, partnering Nathanaël Berthon and Romain Dumas in the LMP1 category. The team finished fourth, losing a podium spot in the closing hours after Delétraz brushed the wall at Indianapolis turn; the subsequent pit stop to replace the front and rear bodywork and a clutch issue when restarting the car dropped the team behind the No. 7 Toyota.

=== 2021: ELMS glory ===
In 2021, it was announced that Delétraz would be competing with Team WRT in the European Le Mans Series in the LMP2 category alongside Robert Kubica and Yifei Ye. With three wins and a P2 finish, they clinched the 2021 European Le Mans Series championship in the LMP2 category. Alongside this, Delétraz competed in the 2021 8 Hours of Portimão in the FIA World Endurance Championship, finishing in P6. Additionally, Delétraz competed in the 2021 24 Hours of Le Mans with his European Le Mans series teammates. After leading the race with one lap to go, the car, with Yifei Ye behind the wheel, stopped down the hill past the Dunlop Bridge because of a broken throttle sensor creating an electrical short circuit that temporarily turned the engine's electronic control unit off. Because of this, the team had to retire the car.

=== 2022: Successful ELMS title defence ===
Delétraz driving at the 2022 24 Hours of Le Mans.

In 2022, it was announced that Delétraz would be competing with the Prema Orlen Team in the 2022 FIA World Endurance Championship and Prema Racing in the 2022 European Le Mans Series both on a full season basis. In the 2022 FIA World Endurance Championship, Delétraz finished fifth in the LMP2 championship with a second-place finish in the 2022 24 Hours of Le Mans. In the 2022 European Le Mans Series however, Delétraz and his teammate, Ferdinand Habsburg clinched the LMP2 Driver's championship with four wins and a third-place finish in Spa. Alongside this, he also competed in the 2022 IMSA SportsCar Championship with Tower Motorsport in the LMP2 class. He lost out on victory at the 24 Hours of Daytona, dropping to third after having had to save fuel heavily. Similarly, an aggressive fuel saving strategy at Road America caused the leading Delétraz to be passed by Ryan Dalziel a few laps from the finish. Nonetheless, two wins in Laguna Seca and Petit Le Mans helped Delétraz (who missed a round of the championship and finished seventh in the drivers' standings) to carry his bronze-ranked teammate John Farano to the drivers' title.

=== 2023: WEC Title ===
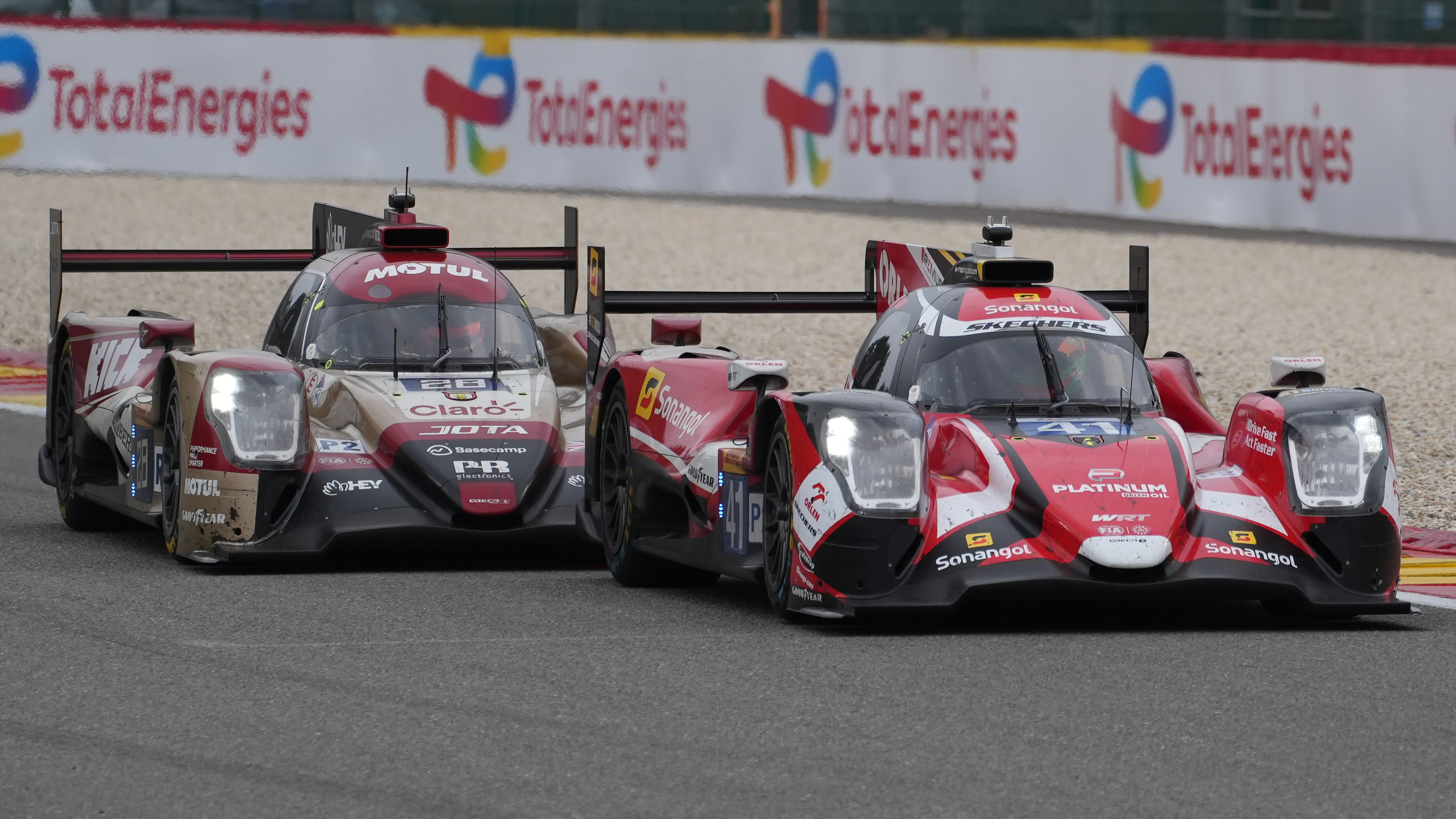
Delétraz ahead of the number 28 Jota Sport entry at the 2023 6 Hours of Spa-Francorchamps

In 2023, it was announced that Delétraz would be joining the Wayne Taylor Racing squad, driving the Acura ARX-06 GTP entry alongside mentor Filipe Albuquerque and Ricky Taylor. He serves as a third driver, competing in the IMSA Michelin Endurance Cup in Daytona, Sebring and Petit Le Mans. In the opening race at the 24 Hours of Daytona, Delétraz and his team finished in second, ending up 4.190 seconds behind the Meyer Shank Racing with Curb-Agajanian Acura entry. The team would end up missing out on the title owing to contact between Albuquerque and championship rival Pipo Derani in the final race at Road Atlanta, an event where Delétraz qualified the No. 10 Acura on pole position, thereby scoring his first ever pole in endurance racing.

For his European season, the Swiss driver would contest a campaign for Team WRT in the LMP2 category of the FIA World Endurance Championship, whilst also joining Racing Team Turkey in an attempt to defend his European Le Mans Series title for the second year in a row, this time entering the Pro-Am class alongside Charlie Eastwood and Salih Yoluç. During the ELMS season-opener at Barcelona, Delétraz managed to overcome a late pit stop for a change of his car's tail section to pass Neel Jani for the lead with 15 minutes to go, thus beginning RTT's season with an overall victory. Another class victory followed at Paul Ricard, though Delétraz would drop from the overall lead to third within the final few laps as a de-laminating tyre shredded parts of the car's bodywork. Bad luck hit the No. 34 crew at Aragón, where a prospective second place was scuppered during the final pit stop, as the car could not be fired up for eleven minutes, thus dropping them to ninth in class. Despite one further Pro-Am podium in Spa, the team missed out on the title, as a spin by Yoluç in the penultimate race acted as a defining setback. At the end of the year, the team finished third, both in the Pro-Am and overall standings.

The main success story of the season came in the WEC, where Delétraz was partnered by Robert Kubica and Rui Andrade. Following a fifth place at Sebring and a podium at Portimão, the trio combined to take the championship lead with a victory at Spa. Despite a strong race at the 24 Hours of Le Mans, the team were unable to beat the No. 34 of Inter Europol Competition; Delétraz losing out in the final stint to Fabio Scherer, who controlled the gap until the checkered flag. Another podium followed in Italy, where a late-race overtake by Delétraz on the No. 23 United Autosport guaranteed the team third. Thereafter, a controlled drive to victory in Fuji and a dominant display by WRT at Bahrain, one where the No. 41 took the lead late thanks to pit stop troubles for the No. 31 sister car, ended up guaranteeing Delétraz, Kubica, and Andrade the final ever LMP2 title in the WEC era.

At the end of the year, the Swiss auto racing federation awarded Delétraz the 2023 Auto Sport Schweiz Award for "special services to Swiss motorsport".

=== 2024: Sebring win & third ELMS title ===
Remaining with Wayne Taylor Racing, Delétraz embarked on a full-time campaign in the IMSA SportsCar Championship alongside Jordan Taylor, with Colton Herta joining them for the endurance rounds. At the season-opening 24 Hours of Daytona, the Swiss driver managed to resist the advances of Porsche's Mathieu Jaminet during a late restart to finish third, managing to recover for a podium despite a loss of power that lost the team one lap during the night. The following 12 Hours of Sebring saw Delétraz pull off a winning move on Sébastien Bourdais with five minutes to go, claiming WTR's first victory of the GTP era. At Long Beach, Delétraz crashed out of the race at the first corner, minutes after starting his stint. Following two top-five finishes, the Swiss driver took his first pole position of the campaign at Watkins Glen. Delétraz was in the lead until the final restart, where he could not get heat into his car's tyres and dropped to fourth. At Road America, Delétraz served two drive-through penalties, one for causing a collision with Richard Westbrook and one for a pit stop infraction committed by his team, leaving the car eighth by the end. Another penalty, this time for contact with the GT of Chaz Mostert, caused Delétraz to miss out on a podium once again in Indianapolis, though a post-race disqualification dropped the No. 40 to last. Seventh at Petit Le Mans left Delétraz and Taylor fifth in the GTP drivers' standings.

Parallel to his commitments overseas, Delétraz partnered long-time teammate Kubica and prototype rookie Jonny Edgar at AO Racing by TF in the ELMS. The team started the campaign with seventh at Barcelona and third in Le Castellet. Despite being jumped for the lead in the pits and later gapped by Charles Milesi near the end of the Imola race, Delétraz initially inherited the win as Milesi was penalised for a FCY infraction. The penalty was dropped after an appeal by Panis Racing, leaving the No. 14 AO car second. Delétraz then scored pole for the 4 Hours of Spa-Francorchamps and fended off Tom Dillmann in the closing laps to take victory, one that put the team into the championship lead. Fifth at Mugello set up a title decider in Portimão, ahead of which Delétraz and his teammates were leading the No. 43 Inter Europol entry by merely six points. Helped by a falsely applied penalty to Inter Europol in the finale, Delétraz, Kubica, and Edgar clinched the ELMS title by finishing second. This result made Delétraz the first driver to take three LMP2 titles in the European Le Mans Series.

Delétraz and AO by TF also took part in the 24 Hours of Le Mans as a Pro-Am entry with Alex Quinn and team owner P. J. Hyett, where the Swiss went on to take pole position. The team finished second in the Pro-Am subclass and sixth in LMP2 overall.

=== 2025: ELMS title Nr. 4, Le Mans subclass win ===
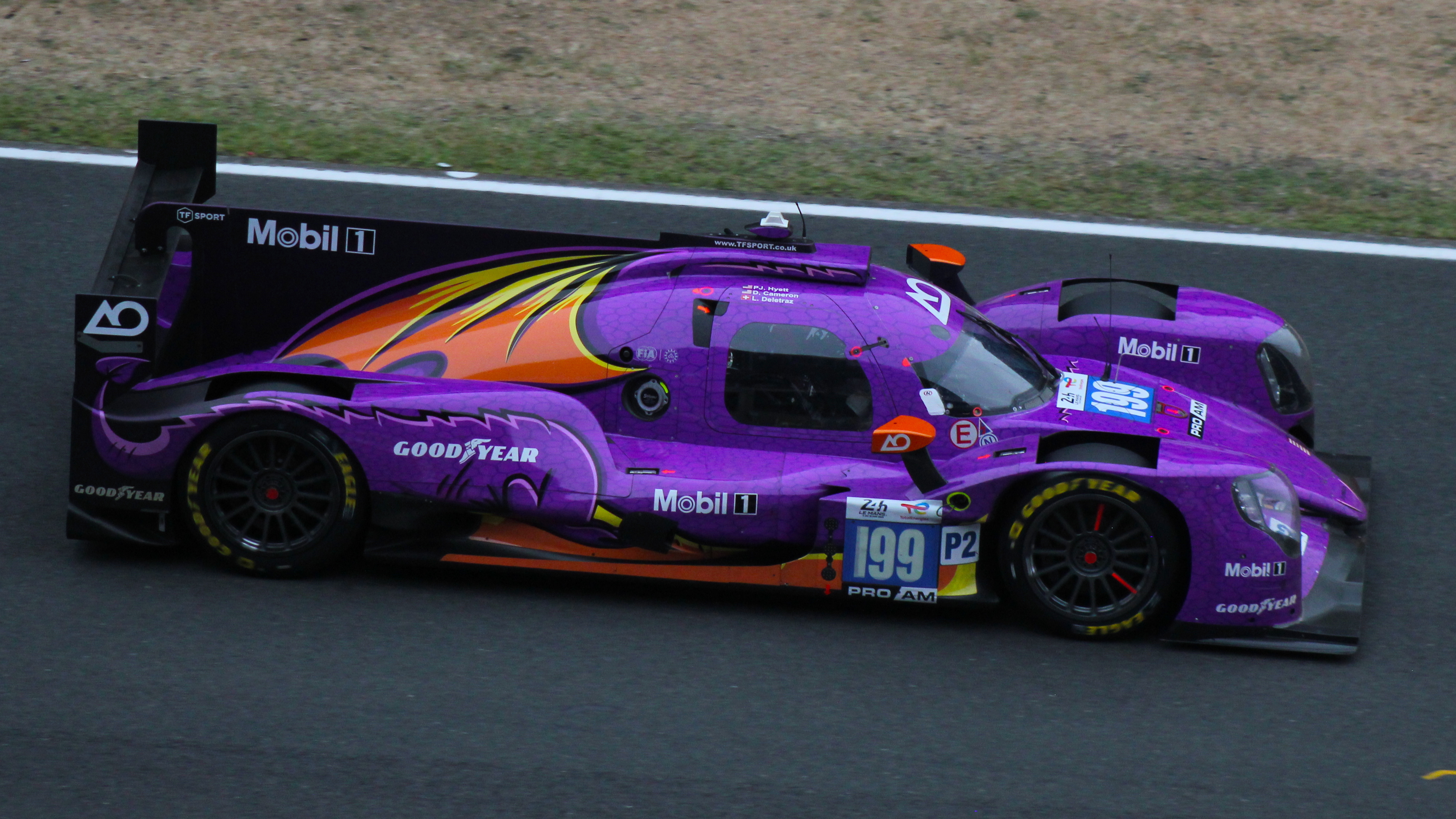
Delétraz's class-winning No. 199 car at the 2025 24 Hours of Le Mans

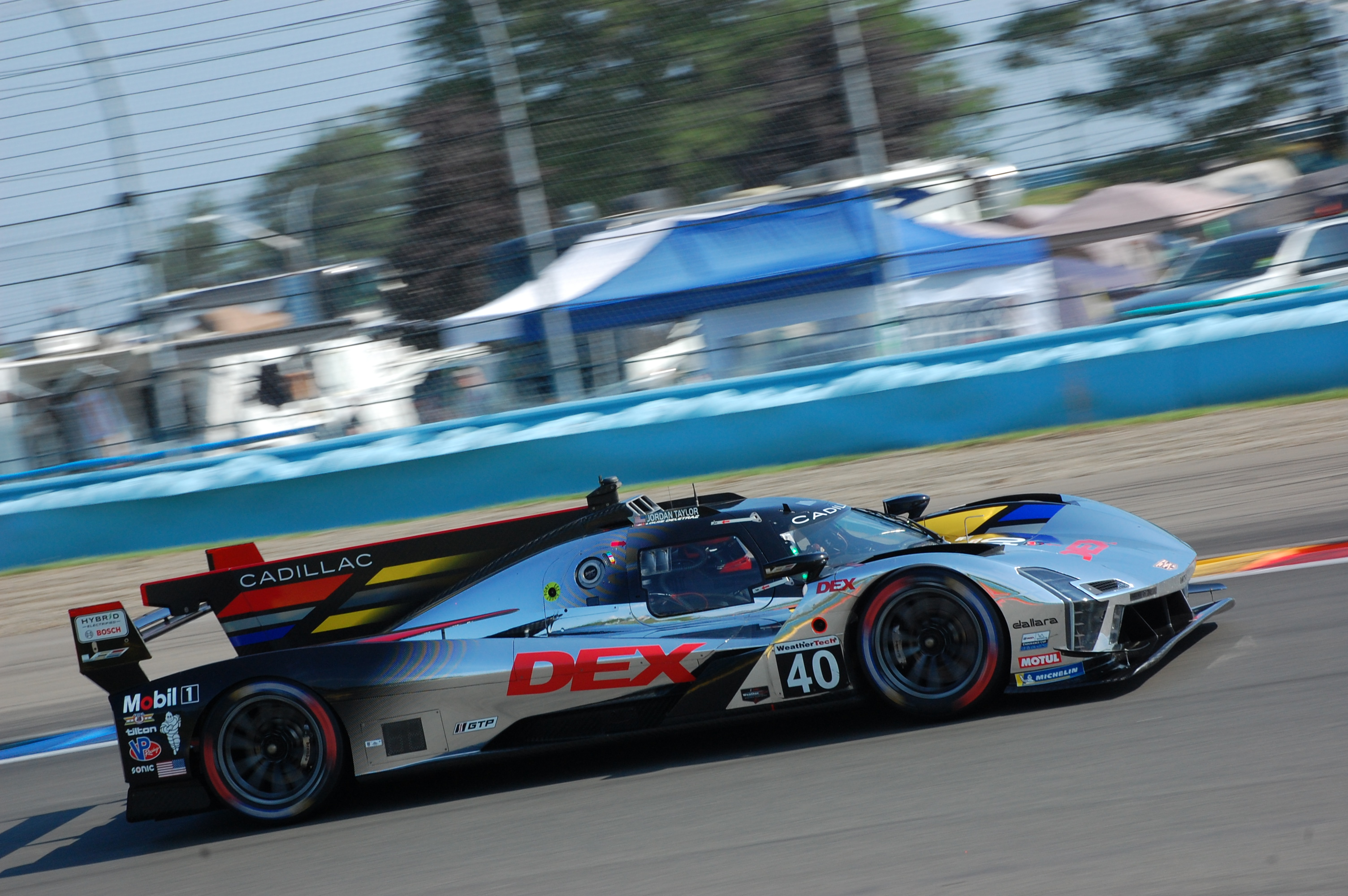
Delétraz at Watkins Glen in 2025

As WTR moved to the Cadillac V-Series.R chassis ahead of the 2025 IMSA season, Delétraz and Taylor remained with the No. 40 crew. Joined by Kamui Kobayashi for the 24 Hours of Daytona, the talents of the Japanese racing legend brought the No. 40 into the lead during the evening. This was undone by a mistake from Delétraz during the eighth hour, as a twitch saw him spin into the turn 2 barrier, after which the car was carried back onto the track and hit by oncoming traffic. Delétraz later theorised that a loss of tyre grip caused him to lose control. Another crash, this time one caused by one-off teammate Brendon Hartley, caused the team to fall out of contention at Sebring. Following three finishes inside the top ten, Delétraz and Taylor finished second at Watkins Glen. Three more finishes at the lower end of the top ten left the #40 team ninth in the teams' standings.

Delétraz returned to AO by TF in ELMS, pairing up with Hyett and 2024 IMSA champion Dane Cameron in the LMP2 Pro-Am class. Having fought for victory in Barcelona, Delétraz was relegated to last in class thanks to a mechanical failure. The team returned to form with second in class, third overall at Le Castellet, where Delétraz charged past category rival Mathias Beche late in the race. Then came Le Mans, where Delétraz qualified third in LMP2 before leading AO by TF to a Pro-Am subclass win. Subsequently, a strong fight against the No. 77 Proton Competition at Imola heralded AO by TF's first ELMS victory of the season. Despite suffering contact from Rodrigo Sales at the start in Spa, the team recovered to third in class. At the second-to-last race in Silverstone, it looked like Delétraz had beaten Algarve Pro Racing's Alex Quinn to victory in a battle in rainy conditions; though when the race was red-flagged, a five-second penalty given to Delétraz for driving standards demoted the Swiss driver to second. Nevertheless, Delétraz and his teammates won the Pro-Am title by finishing second in Portimão. This extended Delétraz's streak to four ELMS titles in five seasons.

== Driver profile ==
Delétraz has been noted for his bold and aggressive overtaking style in high-pressure scenarios. This has been exemplified by his pass for the win on Neel Jani at the 2023 4 Hours of Barcelona and the overtake on Sébastien Bourdais to win the 2024 12 Hours of Sebring. He also notably attempted an unlikely attack against leader Anthoine Hubert on the final lap of the 2019 Monaco F2 sprint race, which Delétraz lost by less than a tenth of a second.

Before his first top-class endurance season in IMSA as a third driver for Wayne Taylor Racing, team owner Wayne Taylor described Delétraz as "very mature". Delétraz showed this in the 2022 ELMS season finale, where he was handed the car in a dominant lead and told to consolidate the lead without crashing.

== Karting record ==
=== Karting career summary ===
Season	Series	Team	Position
2008	Swiss Championship — Super Mini		NC
2009	Vega Trofeo — Super Mini	JD Racing Team	1st
2010	Bridgestone Cup Switzerland — KF3	JD Racing Team	3rd
2010	Vega Trofeo — Junior	JD Racing Team	3rd
2011	South Garda Winter Cup — KF3	JD Racing Team	NC
2011	Bridgestone Cup Switzerland — KF3	JD Racing Team	5th
2011	Vega Trofeo — Junior	JD Racing Team	1st
2011	Bridgestone Cup European Final — KF3	JD Racing Team	35th
2011	Grand Prix Open Karting — KF3	JD Racing Team	22nd

== Racing record ==
=== Racing career summary ===
Season	Series	Team	Races	Wins	Poles	F/Laps	Podiums	Points	Position
2012	Formula BMW Talent Cup	N/A	3	1	3	1	2	40	4th
2013	Formula Renault 2.0 NEC	Josef Kaufmann Racing	16	0	0	0	0	77	19th
2014	Formula Renault 2.0 NEC	Josef Kaufmann Racing	15	1	1	0	5	242	**2nd**
2014	Eurocup Formula Renault 2.0	AVF	4	0	0	0	0	0	NC†
2014	Eurocup Formula Renault 2.0	Josef Kaufmann Racing	2	0	0	0	0	0	NC†
2015	Formula Renault 2.0 NEC	Josef Kaufmann Racing	16	9	12	8	12	378	**1st**
2015	Eurocup Formula Renault 2.0	Josef Kaufmann Racing	17	3	5	3	5	193	**2nd**
2015	Formula Renault 3.5 Series	Comtec Racing	2	0	0	0	0	0	29th
2016	Formula V8 3.5 Series	Fortec Motorsport	18	2	3	5	9	230	**2nd**
2016	ADAC GT Masters	Schubert Motorsport	8	0	0	0	0	14	36th
2016	GP2 Series	Carlin	2	0	0	0	0	0	26th
2017	FIA Formula 2 Championship	Racing Engineering	14	0	0	0	0	16	17th
2017	FIA Formula 2 Championship	Rapax	8	0	0	0	0	16	17th
2017	24H Series - A6	GP Extreme	1	0	0	0	0	0	NC†
2018	FIA Formula 2 Championship	Charouz Racing System	24	0	0	0	2	74	10th
2018	Formula One	Haas F1 Team	Test driver						
2019	FIA Formula 2 Championship	Carlin	22	0	0	0	3	92	8th
2019	Formula One	Haas F1 Team	Development driver						
2020	FIA Formula 2 Championship	Charouz Racing System	24	0	0	2	5	134	8th
2020	GT World Challenge Europe Endurance Cup	GPX Racing	3	0	0	0	0	2	32nd
2020	24 Hours of Le Mans - LMP1	Rebellion Racing	1	0	0	0	0	N/A	4th
2020	Formula One	Haas F1 Team	Test/Reserve driver						
2021	European Le Mans Series - LMP2	Team WRT	6	3	0	0	4	118	**1st**
2021	24 Hours of Le Mans - LMP2	Team WRT	1	0	0	0	0	N/A	NC
2021	FIA World Endurance Championship - LMP2	Inter Europol Competition	1	0	0	0	0	15	20th
2022	FIA World Endurance Championship - LMP2	Prema Orlen Team	6	0	0	1	1	94	5th
2022	24 Hours of Le Mans - LMP2	Prema Orlen Team	1	0	0	0	1	N/A	**2nd**
2022	IMSA SportsCar Championship - LMP2	Tower Motorsport	6	2	0	3	5	1712	7th
2022	European Le Mans Series - LMP2	Prema Racing	6	4	0	1	5	125	**1st**
2023	FIA World Endurance Championship - LMP2	Team WRT	7	3	0	0	6	173	**1st**
2023	24 Hours of Le Mans - LMP2	Team WRT	1	0	0	0	1	N/A	**2nd**
2023	European Le Mans Series - LMP2 Pro-Am	Racing Team Turkey	6	2	0	0	3	94	**3rd**
2023	IMSA SportsCar Championship - GTP	Wayne Taylor Racing with Andretti Autosport	4	0	1	0	1	1165	11th
2023	IMSA SportsCar Championship - LMP2	Tower Motorsports	3	0	0	0	1	912	12th
2023–24	Asian Le Mans Series - LMP2	99 Racing	5	2	0	1	3	70	**3rd**
2024	IMSA SportsCar Championship - GTP	Wayne Taylor Racing with Andretti	9	1	1	1	2	2603	5th
2024	European Le Mans Series - LMP2	AO by TF	6	1	1	0	4	93	**1st**
2024	24 Hours of Le Mans - LMP2	AO by TF	1	0	1	0	0	N/A	6th
2024	IMSA SportsCar Championship - LMP2	AO Racing	1	0	0	0	0	265	47th
2024–25	Asian Le Mans Series - LMP2	Pure Rxcing	2	0	0	0	1	19	12th
2025	IMSA SportsCar Championship - GTP	Cadillac Wayne Taylor Racing	9	0	0	0	1	2304	10th
2025	24 Hours of Le Mans - Hypercar	Cadillac Wayne Taylor Racing	Reserve driver						
2025	European Le Mans Series - LMP2 Pro-Am	AO by TF	6	1	0	1	5	100	**1st**
2025	24 Hours of Le Mans - LMP2	AO by TF	1	0	0	0	1	N/A	**3rd**
2025–26	Asian Le Mans Series - LMP2	CrowdStrike Racing by APR	6	3	0	0	5	109	**1st**
2026	IMSA SportsCar Championship - GTP	Cadillac Wayne Taylor Racing	9	0	1	0	2	2556	8th
2026	European Le Mans Series - LMP2 Pro-Am	AO by TF	5	0	0	0	1	26	11th
2026	FIA World Endurance Championship - Hypercar	Cadillac Hertz Team Jota	2	0	0	0	0	26	17th
2026–27	Asian Le Mans Series - LMP2	CrowdStrike Racing by APR							

† As Delétraz was a guest driver, he was ineligible for championship points.

=== Complete Formula Renault 2.0 Northern European Cup results ===
(key) (Races in bold indicate pole position) (Races in italics indicate fastest lap)

Year	Team	1	2	3	4	5	6	7	8	9	10	11	12	13	14	15	16	17	DC	Points
2013	Josef Kaufmann Racing	HOC; 1; 25	HOC; 2; 29	HOC; 3; 19	NÜR; 1 Ret	NÜR; 2; 14	SIL; 1 Ret	SIL; 2; 5	SPA; 1; 21	SPA; 2; 11	ASS; 1; 11	ASS; 2; 9	MST; 1; 24	MST; 2; 16	MST; 3; 13	ZAN; 1; 18	ZAN; 2; 17	ZAN; 3 C	19th	77
2014	Josef Kaufmann Racing	**MNZ**; **1**; 1	MNZ; 2; 2	SIL; 1; 13	SIL; 2; 21	HOC; 1; 4	HOC; 2; 6	HOC; 3; 8	SPA; 1; 3	SPA; 2; 2	ASS; 1; 8	ASS; 2; 3	MST; 1; 4	MST; 2; 10	MST; 3 C	NÜR; 1; 7	NÜR; 2; 5	NÜR; 3 C	2nd	242
2015	Josef Kaufmann Racing	**MNZ**; **1**; 14	**MNZ**; **2**; 1	**SIL**; **1**; 1	**SIL**; **2**; 1	**RBR**; **1**; 2	RBR; 2; 2	**RBR**; **3**; 1	SPA; 1; 4	**SPA**; **2**; 1	ASS; 1; 5	**ASS**; **2**; 1	NÜR; 1; 2	**NÜR**; **2**; 10	**HOC**; **1**; 1	**HOC**; **2**; 1	**HOC**; **3**; 1		1st	378

=== Complete Eurocup Formula Renault 2.0 results ===
(key) (Races in bold indicate pole position; races in italics indicate fastest lap)

Year	Team	1	2	3	4	5	6	7	8	9	10	11	12	13	14	15	16	17	DC	Points
2014	AVF	ALC; 1	ALC; 2	SPA; 1 Ret	SPA; 2; 16	SIL; 1	SIL; 2					LEC; 1; 16	LEC; 2; 18	JER; 1	JER; 2				NC†	0
2014	Josef Kaufmann Racing							NÜR; 1; 24	NÜR; 2; 7	HUN; 1	HUN; 2								NC†	0
2015	Josef Kaufmann Racing	**ALC**; **1**; 1	**ALC**; **2**; 1	ALC; 3; 6	SPA; 1; 4	SPA; 2 Ret	**HUN**; **1**; 3	**HUN**; **2**; 1	SIL; 1; 9	SIL; 2; 8	SIL; 3; 6	**NÜR**; **1**; 6	NÜR; 2; 4	LMS; 1; 3	LMS; 2; 8	JER; 1; 4	JER; 2; 5	JER; 3; 6	2nd	193

^{†} As Delétraz was a guest driver, he was ineligible for points.

=== Complete Formula V8 3.5 Series results ===
(key) (Races in bold indicate pole position; races in italics indicate fastest lap)

Year	Team	1	2	3	4	5	6	7	8	9	10	11	12	13	14	15	16	17	18	Pos	Points
2015	Comtec Racing	ALC; 1	ALC; 2	MON; 1	SPA; 1	SPA; 2	HUN; 1	HUN; 2	RBR; 1; 15	RBR; 2 Ret	SIL; 1	SIL; 2	NÜR; 1	NÜR; 2	BUG; 1	BUG; 2	JER; 1	JER; 2		29th	0
2016	Fortec Motorsports	ALC; 1; 1	ALC; 2; 5	HUN; 1; 3	HUN; 2; 4	SPA; 1; 3	SPA; 2 Ret	LEC; 1; 6	LEC; 2; 1	SIL; 1; 10	SIL; 2; 6	**RBR**; **1**; 2	RBR; 2; 4	MNZ; 1; 2	MNZ; 2; 3	JER; 1; 12	**JER**; **2**; 2	CAT; 1; 2	**CAT**; **2**; 4	2nd	230

=== Complete 24 Hours of Zolder results ===
Year	Team	Co-Drivers	Car	Class	Laps	Pos.	Class Pos.
2015	(Germany) Walkenhorst Motorsport	(United States) Trent Hindman (Sweden) Victor Bouveng (Germany) Dirk Adorf	BMW M235i Racing Cup	T7	710	15th	7th

=== Complete GP2 Series/FIA Formula 2 Championship results ===
(key) (Races in bold indicate pole position) (Races in italics indicate fastest lap)

Year	Entrant	1	2	3	4	5	6	7	8	9	10	11	12	13	14	15	16	17	18	19	20	21	22	23	24	DC	Points
2016	Carlin	CAT; FEA	CAT; SPR	MON; FEA	MON; SPR	BAK; FEA	BAK; SPR	RBR; FEA	RBR; SPR	SIL; FEA	SIL; SPR	HUN; FEA	HUN; SPR	HOC; FEA	HOC; SPR	SPA; FEA	SPA; SPR	MNZ; FEA	MNZ; SPR	SEP; FEA	SEP; SPR	YMC; FEA; Ret	YMC; SPR; 17			26th	0
2017	Racing Engineering	BHR; FEA; 20	BHR; SPR; 12	CAT; FEA; 11	CAT; SPR; 14	MON; FEA; 14	MON; SPR; 16	BAK; FEA; Ret	BAK; SPR; 16	RBR; FEA; 17	RBR; SPR; 13	SIL; FEA; 12	SIL; SPR; 13	HUN; FEA; 10	HUN; SPR; 12											17th	16
2017	Rapax															SPA; FEA; 14	SPA; SPR; 12	MNZ; FEA; 7	MNZ; SPR; 4	JER; FEA; 17	JER; SPR; 12	YMC; FEA; 10	YMC; SPR; Ret			17th	16
2018	Charouz Racing System	BHR; FEA; 13	BHR; SPR; 9	BAK; FEA; Ret	BAK; SPR; 10	CAT; FEA; Ret	CAT; SPR; 10	MON; FEA; 4	MON; SPR; 2	LEC; FEA; 6	LEC; SPR; 2	RBR; FEA; Ret	RBR; SPR; Ret	SIL; FEA; 4	SIL; SPR; 5	HUN; FEA; 17	HUN; SPR; 9	SPA; FEA; 18	SPA; SPR; 13	MNZ; FEA; 13	MNZ; SPR; 11	SOC; FEA; 12	SOC; SPR; 13	YMC; FEA; 6	YMC; SPR; 6	10th	74
2019	Carlin	BHR; FEA; 5	BHR; SPR; 5	BAK; FEA; Ret	BAK; SPR; Ret	CAT; FEA; 12	CAT; SPR; 11	MON; FEA; 7	MON; SPR; 2	LEC; FEA; NC	LEC; SPR; 7	RBR; FEA; 7	RBR; SPR; Ret	SIL; FEA; 7	SIL; SPR; 2	HUN; FEA; Ret	HUN; SPR; 13	SPA; FEA; C	SPA; SPR; C	MNZ; FEA; Ret	MNZ; SPR; 8	SOC; FEA; 3	SOC; SPR; 14	YMC; FEA; 4	YMC; SPR; 6	8th	92
2020	Charouz Racing System	RBR; FEA; 7	RBR; SPR; 2	RBR; FEA; 19	RBR; SPR; 12	HUN; FEA; 7	HUN; SPR; 6	SIL; FEA; 6	SIL; SPR; 3	SIL; FEA; 5	SIL; SPR; 4	CAT; FEA; 10	CAT; SPR; 9	SPA; FEA; 4	SPA; SPR; 6	MNZ; FEA; 8	MNZ; SPR; 4	MUG; FEA; 3	MUG; SPR; 2	SOC; FEA; 18	SOC; SPR; 17	BHR; FEA; 16	BHR; SPR; 3	BHR; FEA; 12	BHR; SPR; 13	8th	134

=== Complete 24 Hours of Le Mans results ===
Year	Team	Co-Drivers	Car	Class	Laps	Pos.	Class Pos.
2020	(Switzerland) Rebellion Racing	(France) Nathanaël Berthon (France) Romain Dumas	Rebellion R13-Gibson	LMP1	381	4th	4th
2021	(Belgium) Team WRT	(Poland) Robert Kubica (China) Yifei Ye	Oreca 07-Gibson	LMP2	362	NC	NC
2022	(Italy) Prema Orlen Team	(Italy) Lorenzo Colombo (Poland) Robert Kubica	Oreca 07-Gibson	LMP2	369	6th	**2nd**
2023	(Belgium) Team WRT	(Angola) Rui Andrade (Poland) Robert Kubica	Oreca 07-Gibson	LMP2	328	10th	**2nd**
2024	(United States) AO by TF	(United States) P. J. Hyett (United Kingdom) Alex Quinn	Oreca 07-Gibson	LMP2	295	20th	6th
2024	(United States) AO by TF	(United States) P. J. Hyett (United Kingdom) Alex Quinn	Oreca 07-Gibson	LMP2 Pro-Am	295	20th	**2nd**
2025	(United States) AO by TF	(United States) Dane Cameron (United States) P. J. Hyett	Oreca 07-Gibson	LMP2	366	20th	**3rd**
2025	(United States) AO by TF	(United States) Dane Cameron (United States) P. J. Hyett	Oreca 07-Gibson	LMP2 Pro-Am	366	20th	**1st**
2026	(United States) Cadillac Hertz Team Jota	(France) Norman Nato (United Kingdom) Will Stevens	Cadillac V-Series.R	Hypercar	381	4th	4th

=== Complete European Le Mans Series results ===
(key) (Races in bold indicate pole position; results in italics indicate fastest lap)

Year	Entrant	Class	Chassis	Engine	1	2	3	4	5	6	Rank	Points
2021	Team WRT	LMP2	Oreca 07	Gibson GK428 4.2 L V8	CAT; 1	RBR; 1	LEC; 5	MNZ; 4	SPA; 1	ALG; 2	1st	118
2022	Prema Racing	LMP2	Oreca 07	Gibson GK428 4.2 L V8	LEC; 1	IMO; 1	MNZ; 5	CAT; 1	SPA; 3	ALG; 1	1st	125
2023	Racing Team Turkey	LMP2 Pro-Am	Oreca 07	Gibson GK428 4.2 L V8	**CAT**; 1	**LEC**; 1	**ARA**; 9	**SPA**; 2	ALG; 6	ALG; 4	3rd	94
2024	Orlen Team AO by TF	LMP2	Oreca 07	Gibson GK428 4.2 L V8	CAT; 7	LEC; 3	IMO; 2	**SPA**; 1	MUG; 5	ALG; 2	1st	93
2025	AO by TF	LMP2 Pro-Am	Oreca 07	Gibson GK428 4.2 L V8	CAT; 8	**LEC**; 2	IMO; 1	SPA; 3	**SIL**; 2	ALG; 2	1st	100
2026	AO by TF	LMP2 Pro-Am	Oreca 07	Gibson GK428 4.2 L V8	CAT; 10	LEC	IMO; 9	SPA; 3	SIL; 6	ALG; Ret	11th	26

^{*} Season still in progress.

=== Complete FIA World Endurance Championship results ===
(key) (Races in bold indicate pole position; races in italics indicate fastest lap)

Year	Entrant	Class	Car	Engine	1	2	3	4	5	6	7	8	Rank	Points
2021	Inter Europol Competition	LMP2	Oreca 07	Gibson GK428 4.2 L V8	SPA	ALG; 5	MNZ	LMS	BHR	BHR			20th	15
2022	Prema Orlen Team	LMP2	Oreca 07	Gibson GK428 4.2 L V8	SEB; 4	SPA; 7	LMS; 2	MNZ; 6	FUJ; 6	BHR; 4			5th	94
2023	Team WRT	LMP2	Oreca 07	Gibson GK428 4.2 L V8	SEB; 4	ALG; 3	SPA; 1	LMS; 2	**MNZ**; 3	FUJ; 1	BHR; 1		1st	173
2026	Cadillac Hertz Team Jota	Hypercar	Cadillac V-Series.R	Cadillac LMC55R 5.5 L V8	IMO	SPA; 9	LMS; 4	SÃO	COA	FUJ	CAT	MNZ	17th	26

=== Complete IMSA SportsCar Championship results ===
(key) (Races in bold indicate pole position; races in italics indicate fastest lap)

Year	Entrant	Class	Make	Engine	1	2	3	4	5	6	7	8	9	10	Rank	Points
2022	Tower Motorsport	LMP2	Oreca 07	Gibson GK428 4.2 L V8	DAY; 3†	SEB; 7	LGA; 1	MDO	WGL; 2	ELK; 2	PET; 1				7th	1712
2023	Wayne Taylor Racing with Andretti Autosport	GTP	Acura ARX-06	Acura AR24e 2.4 L Turbo V6	DAY; 2	SEB; 4	LBH		WGL; 6	MOS			**PET**; **9**		11th	1165
2023	Tower Motorsports	LMP2	Oreca 07	Gibson GK428 4.2 L V8				LGA; 8			ELK; 4	IMS; 2			12th	912
2024	AO Racing	LMP2	Oreca 07	Gibson GK428 V8							**MOS**; 8				47th	26
2024	Wayne Taylor Racing with Andretti Autosport	GTP	Acura ARX-06	Acura AR24e 2.4 L Turbo V6	DAY; 3	SEB; 1	LBH; 10	LGA; 4	DET; 5	**WGL**; 4		ELK; 8	IMS; 11	PET; 7	5th	2603
2025	Cadillac Wayne Taylor Racing	GTP	Cadillac V-Series.R	Cadillac LMC55R 5.5 L V8	DAY; 11	SEB; 11	LBH; 7	LGA; 7	DET; 9	WGL; 2	ELK; 9	IMS; 9	PET; 8		10th	2304
2026	Cadillac Wayne Taylor Racing	GTP	Cadillac V-Series.R	Cadillac LMC55R 5.5 L V8	DAY; 6	SEB; 7	LBH; 8	**LGA**; 10	DET; 6	WGL; 8	ELK; 3	IMS; 4	PET; 3		8th	2556

^{†} Points only counted towards the Michelin Endurance Cup, and not the overall LMP2 Championship.

=== Complete Asian Le Mans Series results ===
(key) (Races in bold indicate pole position) (Races in italics indicate fastest lap)

Year	Team	Class	Car	Engine	1	2	3	4	5	6	Pos.	Points
2023–24	99 Racing	LMP2	Oreca 07	Gibson GK428 4.2 L V8	SEP; 1; 1	SEP; 2; 2	DUB; 1; 1	**ABU**; **1** Ret	**ABU**; **2**; 11		3rd	70
2024–25	Pure Rxcing	LMP2	Oreca 07	Gibson GK428 4.2 L V8	SEP; 1; 3	SEP; 2; 8	DUB; 1	DUB; 2	ABU; 1	ABU; 2	12th	19
2025–26	CrowdStrike Racing by APR	LMP2	Oreca 07	Gibson GK428 4.2 L V8	SEP; 1; 3	SEP; 2; 3	DUB; 1; 1	DUB; 2; 1	ABU; 1; 1	ABU; 2; 8	1st	109

Sporting positions
Preceded by Ben Barnicoat	Formula Renault 2.0 NEC; Champion; 2015	Succeeded by Lando Norris
Preceded by Phil Hanson; Filipe Albuquerque	European Le Mans Series; LMP2 Champion; 2021-2022; With: Robert Kubica & Yifei Ye (2021), Ferdinand Habsburg (2022)	Succeeded by Alex Lynn; Kyffin Simpson; James Allen
Preceded by António Félix da Costa; Will Stevens; Roberto González	FIA Endurance Trophy for LMP2 Drivers; 2023; With: Robert Kubica & Rui Andrade	Succeeded by None (Class discontinued)
Preceded by Alex Lynn; Kyffin Simpson; James Allen	European Le Mans Series; LMP2 Champion; 2024; With: Robert Kubica & Jonny Edgar	Succeeded by Oliver Gray; Esteban Masson; Charles Milesi
Preceded by Matthieu Vaxivière; François Perrodo; Alessio Rovera	European Le Mans Series; LMP2 Pro-Am Champion; 2025; With: Dane Cameron & P.J. Hyett	Succeeded by Incumbent
