= 2013 Formula Renault 2.0 Northern European Cup =

Auto racing championship

2013 Formula Renault 2.0 NEC

Seasons
- ← 2012 2014 →

The 2013 Formula Renault 2.0 Northern European Cup was the eighth Formula Renault 2.0 Northern European Cup season, an open-wheel motor racing series for emerging young racing drivers based in Europe. The season began at Hockenheimring on 7 April and ended on 14 October at Zandvoort, after sixteen races at seven events.

The title was clinched by Fortec Motorsports driver Matt Parry, who won five races. His teammate Jack Aitken finished as runner-up after five podium finishes. Dennis Olsen with three podiums completed the top three in the drivers' standings. Wins in other races were shared between non-regular drivers Oliver Rowland, Steijn Schothorst, Andrea Pizzitola, Esteban Ocon, Óscar Tunjo and Jake Dennis.

== Drivers and teams ==
Team	No.	Driver name	Rounds
(Germany) Josef Kaufmann Racing	1	(Netherlands) Steijn Schothorst	1, 5–7
(Germany) Josef Kaufmann Racing	2	(Sweden) Gustav Malja	1–2, 6
(Germany) Josef Kaufmann Racing	3	(Colombia) Óscar Tunjo	2, 4, 6
(Germany) Josef Kaufmann Racing	4	(Norway) Dennis Olsen	All
(Germany) Josef Kaufmann Racing	5	(Switzerland) Louis Delétraz	All
(Poland) Inter Europol	6	(Poland) Jakub Śmiechowski	All
(Poland) Inter Europol	45	(Germany) Max Biedermann	6–7
(United Kingdom) Fortec Motorsports	7	(United Kingdom) Jake Dennis	1–2
(United Kingdom) Fortec Motorsports	8	(Finland) Mikko Pakkari	1–2, 5
(United Kingdom) Fortec Motorsports	9	(United Arab Emirates) Ed Jones	1–2
(United Kingdom) Fortec Motorsports	28	(India) Shahaan Engineer	1–2
(United Kingdom) Fortec Motorsports	29	(Indonesia) Philo Paz Armand	All
(United Kingdom) Fortec Motorsports	30	(United Kingdom) Matt Parry	All
(United Kingdom) Fortec Motorsports	31	(United Kingdom) Jack Aitken	All
(United Kingdom) Fortec Motorsports	52	(United Kingdom) Sam MacLeod	4–6
(Germany) SL Formula	10	(Switzerland) Cédric Freiburghaus	All
(Germany) SL Formula	11	(Switzerland) Simon Stoller	1–2
(Germany) SL Formula	41	(United States) Robert Siska	3–4, 7
(Germany) SL Formula	53	(United Kingdom) Sean Walkinshaw	4
(France) ART Junior Team	12	(Italy) Alberto Di Folco	4–7
(France) ART Junior Team	14	(France) Alexandre Baron	1–2
(France) ART Junior Team	15	(France) Esteban Ocon	1–2, 6
(France) ART Junior Team	16	(France) Andrea Pizzitola	1–2, 4–7
(France) ART Junior Team	17	(Thailand) Tanart Sathienthirakul	All
(France) ART Junior Team	18	(France) Nico Jamin	All
(France) ART Junior Team	50	(Brazil) Thiago Vivacqua	6–7
(Luxembourg) RC Formula	19	(Russia) Roman Mavlanov	1–2, 4, 7
(Luxembourg) RC Formula	20	(France) Aurélien Panis	1–2
(United Kingdom) Mark Burdett Racing	21	(Colombia) Andrés Méndez	All
(United Kingdom) Mark Burdett Racing	22	(United Kingdom) Raoul Owens	All
(Denmark) KEO Racing	23	(Sweden) Erik Johansson	1–2
(Denmark) KEO Racing	24	(United Kingdom) James Fletcher	3
(Denmark) KEO Racing	54	(Sweden) Kevin Kleveros	5
(Denmark) KEO Racing	55	(Czech Republic) Josef Záruba	6–7
(Denmark) KEO Racing	56	(Denmark) Michael Markussen	7
(Italy) JD Motorsport	25	(Venezuela) Juan Branger	All
(Italy) JD Motorsport	26	(Poland) Jakub Dalewski	1–6
(United Kingdom) JTR Racing	33	(Ecuador) Julio Moreno	All
(Finland) PositiOne Motorsport	34	(Finland) Miika Laiho	1–3
(United Kingdom) Fortec Competition	35	(Russia) Roman Beregech	All
(United Kingdom) Fortec Competition	36	(United States) Ryan Tveter	All
(United Kingdom) Fortec Competition	37	(Mexico) Alfonso Celis Jr.	All
(United Kingdom) Fortec Competition	38	(Austria) Corinna Kamper	2–7
(Spain) AV Formula	39	(Spain) Fran Rueda	All
(Spain) AV Formula	40	(France) Victor Sendin	1–3
(Spain) AV Formula	51	(Poland) Aleksander Bosak	5–7
(Belgium) KTR	42	(Japan) Yu Kanamaru	1, 5–6
(Belgium) KTR	43	(Thailand) Alex Albon	1, 6
(Belgium) KTR	44	(Italy) Ignazio D'Agosto	1
(Netherlands) Manor MP Motorsport	46	(United Kingdom) Oliver Rowland	1, 6–7
(Netherlands) Manor MP Motorsport	47	(Argentina) Javier Merlo	1
(Czech Republic) Krenek Motorsport	49	(Slovakia) Christian Malcharek	2, 6
(Switzerland) Jenzer Motorsport	58	(Singapore) Andrew Tang	7
(Italy) Brixia Horse Power	59	(Italy) Andrea Baiguera	7

== Race calendar and results ==
The seven-event calendar for the 2013 season was revealed on 2 November 2012.

Round		Circuit	Date	Pole position	Fastest lap	Winning driver	Winning team	Event
1	R1	(Germany) Hockenheimring	6 April	(United Kingdom) Matt Parry	(France) Esteban Ocon	(France) Esteban Ocon	(France) ART Junior Team	Preis der Stadt Stuttgart
1	R2	(Germany) Hockenheimring	7 April	(United Kingdom) Matt Parry	(France) Esteban Ocon	(United Kingdom) Jake Dennis	(United Kingdom) Fortec Motorsports	Preis der Stadt Stuttgart
1	R3	(Germany) Hockenheimring	7 April	(France) Andrea Pizzitola	(France) Andrea Pizzitola	(France) Andrea Pizzitola	(France) ART Junior Team	Preis der Stadt Stuttgart
2	R1	(Germany) Nürburgring	21 April	(Colombia) Óscar Tunjo	(United Kingdom) Matt Parry	(United Kingdom) Matt Parry	(United Kingdom) Fortec Motorsports	AvD 100 Miles
2	R2	(Germany) Nürburgring	21 April	(United Kingdom) Matt Parry	(France) Esteban Ocon	(United Kingdom) Matt Parry	(United Kingdom) Fortec Motorsports	AvD 100 Miles
3	R1	(United Kingdom) Silverstone Circuit	1 June	(United Kingdom) Jack Aitken	(United Kingdom) Matt Parry	(United Kingdom) Matt Parry	(United Kingdom) Fortec Motorsports	Blancpain Endurance Series
3	R2	(United Kingdom) Silverstone Circuit	2 June	(United Kingdom) Jack Aitken	(United Kingdom) Jack Aitken	(United Kingdom) Matt Parry	(United Kingdom) Fortec Motorsports	Blancpain Endurance Series
4	R1	(Belgium) Circuit de Spa-Francorchamps	26 July	(Colombia) Óscar Tunjo	(Colombia) Óscar Tunjo	(Colombia) Óscar Tunjo	(Germany) Josef Kaufmann Racing	Spa 24 Hours
4	R2	(Belgium) Circuit de Spa-Francorchamps	27 July	(Colombia) Óscar Tunjo	(United Kingdom) Matt Parry	(United Kingdom) Matt Parry	(United Kingdom) Fortec Motorsports	Spa 24 Hours
5	R1	(Netherlands) TT Circuit Assen	3 August	(Netherlands) Steijn Schothorst	(Netherlands) Steijn Schothorst	(Netherlands) Steijn Schothorst	(Germany) Josef Kaufmann Racing	Gamma Racing Day
5	R2	(Netherlands) TT Circuit Assen	4 August	(Netherlands) Steijn Schothorst	(Netherlands) Steijn Schothorst	(Netherlands) Steijn Schothorst	(Germany) Josef Kaufmann Racing	Gamma Racing Day
6	R1	(Czech Republic) Autodrom Most	31 August	(United Kingdom) Oliver Rowland	(United Kingdom) Oliver Rowland	(United Kingdom) Oliver Rowland	(Netherlands) Manor MP Motorsport	ADAC Truck Grand Prix
6	R2	(Czech Republic) Autodrom Most	1 September	(United Kingdom) Oliver Rowland	(United Kingdom) Oliver Rowland	(United Kingdom) Oliver Rowland	(Netherlands) Manor MP Motorsport	ADAC Truck Grand Prix
6	R3	(Czech Republic) Autodrom Most	1 September	(France) Andrea Pizzitola	(United Kingdom) Alex Albon	(Netherlands) Steijn Schothorst	(Germany) Josef Kaufmann Racing	ADAC Truck Grand Prix
7	R1	(Netherlands) Circuit Park Zandvoort	12 October	(United Kingdom) Oliver Rowland	(United Kingdom) Oliver Rowland	(United Kingdom) Oliver Rowland	(Netherlands) Manor MP Motorsport	Formido Finaleraces
7	R2	(Netherlands) Circuit Park Zandvoort	13 October	(United Kingdom) Oliver Rowland	(United Kingdom) Oliver Rowland	(United Kingdom) Oliver Rowland	(Netherlands) Manor MP Motorsport	Formido Finaleraces
7	R3	(Netherlands) Circuit Park Zandvoort	13 October	(Norway) Dennis Olsen	Race cancelled (Note: The third race at Zandvoort was cancelled due to rain.)			Formido Finaleraces

== Championship standings ==
- Championship points were awarded on a 30, 24, 20, 17, 16, 15, 14, 13, 12, 11, 10, 9, 8, 7, 6, 5, 4, 3, 2, 1 to the top 20 classified finishers in each race.

Pos	Driver	HOC (Germany)			NÜR (Germany)		SIL (United Kingdom)		SPA (Belgium)		ASS (Netherlands)		MST (Czech Republic)			ZAN (Netherlands)			Points
Pos	Driver	1	2	3	4	5	6	7	8	9	10	11	12	13	14	15	16	17	Points
1	(United Kingdom) Matt Parry	**4**	**3**	3	1	**1**	1	1	2	1	4	2	Ret	23	26	4	Ret	C	289
2	(United Kingdom) Jack Aitken	5	Ret	22	8	9	2	**2**	3	20	2	4	4	3	12	5	4	C	230
3	(Norway) Dennis Olsen	11	16	11	7	12	3	4	12	7	3	3	10	6	10	6	5	**C**	211
4	(United Kingdom) Oliver Rowland	3	2	2									**1**	**1**	3	**1**	**1**	C	208
5	(Netherlands) Steijn Schothorst	8	10	5							**1**	**1**	5	4	1	2	6	C	202
6	(France) Andrea Pizzitola	6	11	**1**	Ret	4			23	2	6	6	6	8	**5**	3	Ret	C	190
7	(France) Nico Jamin	31	Ret	28	21	17	4	3	7	10	7	10	11	12	7	15	7	C	144
8	(Poland) Jakub Dalewski	12	14	10	10	16	8	Ret	10	Ret	Ret	8	7	11	6	7	19	C	135
9	(United Kingdom) Raoul Owens	13	15	15	Ret	19	12	21	4	3	8	7	9	14	9	20	Ret	C	127
10	(Finland) Mikko Pakari	2	5	4	5	3					5	5							125
11	(Thailand) Tanart Sathienthirakul	21	13	16	15	18	7	19	9	5	9	12	Ret	10	19	11	8	C	123
12	(France) Esteban Ocon	1	4	8	2	7							Ret	2	Ret				122
13	(Colombia) Óscar Tunjo				**3**	10			**1**	**Ret**			2	5	4				118
14	(Mexico) Alfonso Celis Jr.	Ret	Ret	24	12	13	5	7	20	13	12	11	22	15	21	13	3	C	109
15	(Sweden) Gustav Malja	9	7	7	28	2							3	7	Ret				98
16	(United States) Ryan Tveter	30	25	25	Ret	11	19	9	5	4	16	14	19	17	27	9	24	C	87
17	(Russia) Roman Beregech	17	23	Ret	Ret	15	6	6	Ret	8	Ret	16	Ret	21	17	8	10	C	86
18	(Russia) Roman Mavlanov	Ret	8	Ret	16	21			8	6						10	2	C	81
19	(Switzerland) Louis Delétraz	25	29	19	Ret	14	Ret	5	21	11	11	9	24	16	13	18	17	C	77
20	(Italy) Alberto Di Folco								Ret	12	10	13	13	18	8	12	9	C	73
21	(France) Victor Sendin	10	21	18	6	8	9	13											62
22	(Thailand) Alex Albon	32	9	23									8	9	2				61
23	(India) Shahaan Engineer	7	6	6	9	Ret													56
24	(Spain) Fran Rueda	Ret	24	Ret	19	20	DNS	12	6	Ret	15	27	14	20	14	22	13	C	56
25	(Ecuador) Julio Moreno	29	Ret	29	25	25	10	8	16	14	17	24	21	28	16	28	18	C	48
26	(Japan) Yu Kanamaru	15	Ret	14							14	15	12	19	11				47
27	(France) Aurélien Panis	18	12	21	4	5													45
28	(Indonesia) Philo Paz Armand	22	20	33	17	22	15	15	15	16	21	17	18	22	23	Ret	11	C	45
29	(United Arab Emirates) Ed Jones	14	18	13	11	6													43
30	(United Kingdom) Sam MacLeod								11	9	13	26	16	13	Ret				43
31	(United Kingdom) Jake Dennis	24	1	9	Ret	DNS													42
32	(Switzerland) Cédric Freiburghaus	23	28	26	14	27	16	10	17	Ret	18	21	23	25	22	16	25	C	35
33	(Sweden) Erik Johansson	16	17	12	13	Ret													26
34	(Austria) Corinna Kamper				20	30	DNS	18	14	Ret	22	23	15	Ret	Ret	29	14	C	24
35	(Colombia) Andrés Méndez	27	Ret	27	22	29	13	16	Ret	15	20	20	28	DNS	DNS	Ret	22	C	21
36	(United Kingdom) James Fletcher						11	11											20
37	(Venezuela) Juan Branger	26	Ret	Ret	26	26	17	14	18	17	25	25	26	24	24				18
38	(Singapore) Andrew Tang															14	12	C	16
39	(Poland) Aleksander Bosak										23	22	17	30	15	23	16	C	15
40	(Poland) Jakub Śmiechowski	20	22	31	18	23	DNS	20	13	21	24	19	Ret	DNS	25	21	Ret	C	15
41	(Finland) Miika Laiho	33	27	32	23	Ret	14	17											11
42	(Brazil) Thiago Vivacqua												Ret	26	28	19	15	C	8
43	(Czech Republic) Josef Záruba												20	29	18	17	Ret	C	8
44	(United States) Robert Siska						18	22	22	19						27	23	C	5
45	(United Kingdom) Sean Walkinshaw								19	18									5
46	(Sweden) Kevin Kleveros										19	18							5
47	(Argentina) Javier Merlo	19	19	20															5
48	(Italy) Ignazio D'Agosto	Ret	Ret	17															4
49	(Slovakia) Christian Malcharek				24	24							27	Ret	20				1
50	(Italy) Andrea Baiguera															24	20	C	1
51	(Germany) Max Biedermann												25	27	Ret	26	21	C	0
52	(Denmark) Michael Markussen															25	Ret	C	0
53	(Switzerland) Simon Stoller	28	26	30	27	Ret													0
54	(France) Alexandre Baron	Ret	Ret	DNS	29	28													0
Pos	Driver	HOC (Germany)			NÜR (Germany)		SIL (United Kingdom)		SPA (Belgium)		ASS (Netherlands)		MST (Czech Republic)			ZAN (Netherlands)			Points

Colour	Result
Gold	Winner
Silver	Second place
Bronze	Third place
Green	Points classification
Blue	Non-points classification
Blue	Non-classified finish (NC)
Purple	Retired, not classified (Ret)
Red	Did not qualify (DNQ)
Red	Did not pre-qualify (DNPQ)
Black	Disqualified (DSQ)
White	Did not start (DNS)
White	Withdrew (WD)
White	Race cancelled (C)
Blank	Did not practice (DNP)
Blank	Did not arrive (DNA)
Blank	Excluded (EX)

**Bold** – Pole
Italics – Fastest Lap
