= 2014 Formula Renault 2.0 Northern European Cup =

Motor racing championship

2014 Formula Renault 2.0 NEC

Seasons
- ← 2013 2015 →

The 2014 Formula Renault 2.0 Northern European Cup was the ninth Formula Renault 2.0 Northern European Cup season, an open-wheel motor racing series for emerging young racing drivers based in Europe. It was contested over 7 race meetings and a total of 15 races – 17 scheduled races, with 2 cancelled due to weather conditions – commencing on 12 April at Monza and concluding on 20 September at the Nürburgring.

The championship title was won by British driver Ben Barnicoat, a member of McLaren's young driver programme, after recording top-ten finishes in all but two of the season's races. Barnicoat, who won races at Hockenheim and Most, finished 16 points clear of his closest rival, Louis Delétraz, who was the winner of the opening race of the season, at Monza. Third place in the championship was settled via a tie-break, as Seb Morris and Steijn Schothorst finished level on points; the tie was settled in favour of Morris, as his two wins – at Silverstone and Assen – gave him the advantage over Schothorst's sole win, at Spa.

Over the course of the season, 11 different drivers won a race. Aside from Barnicoat and Morris, other drivers to win twice were Gustav Malja, who finished fifth in the championship, and Kevin Jörg, who only contested four meetings during the season. Single race victories were taken by full-time series competitor Callan O'Keeffe, Andrea Pizzitola, Levin Amweg, Alexander Albon and Aurélien Panis, however none of the quintet finished higher than O'Keeffe's seventh place in the final championship standings. The teams' championship was won by Josef Kaufmann Racing, thanks to the results of Delétraz, Malja, Jörg and Ryan Tveter.

== Drivers and teams ==
Team	No.	Driver name	Rounds
(Poland) Inter Europol	2	(Canada) David Richert	1–2, 4, 6
(Poland) Inter Europol	3	(Germany) Max Biedermann	1
(Poland) Inter Europol	3	(United States) Robert Siska	2–3, 7
(Poland) Inter Europol	47	(Germany) Max Biedermann	2
(Poland) Inter Europol	52	(Germany) Philip Hamprecht	5, 7
(France) ART Junior Team	4	(France) Aurélien Panis	1–3
(France) ART Junior Team	5	(United Kingdom) Jake Hughes	6–7
(France) ART Junior Team	35	(Switzerland) Levin Amweg	1–3
(France) ART Junior Team	36	(South Africa) Callan O'Keeffe	1–6
(France) ART Junior Team	38	(Australia) James Allen	1
(United Kingdom) Mark Burdett Racing	5	(United Kingdom) Jake Hughes	1–5
(United Kingdom) Mark Burdett Racing	6	(United Kingdom) Raoul Owens	All
(Austria) Speedfish Racing	7	(Austria) Stefan Riener	All
(Sweden) Fragus BR Motorsport	8	(Sweden) Robin Hansson	All
(Sweden) Fragus BR Motorsport	49	(Switzerland) Cédric Freiburghaus	6
(Netherlands) Manor MP Motorsport	9	(Sweden) Philip Morin	1–3
(Netherlands) Manor MP Motorsport	10	(Ecuador) Julio Moreno	All
(Netherlands) Manor MP Motorsport	11	(Netherlands) Steijn Schothorst	All
(Netherlands) Manor MP Motorsport	12	(France) Andrea Pizzitola	1–2, 6–7
(Germany) Josef Kaufmann Racing	14	(Sweden) Gustav Malja	All
(Germany) Josef Kaufmann Racing	15	(Switzerland) Kevin Jörg	1, 4, 6–7
(Germany) Josef Kaufmann Racing	16	(United States) Ryan Tveter	All
(Germany) Josef Kaufmann Racing	17	(Switzerland) Louis Delétraz	All
(Spain) AVF	18	(Netherlands) Roy Geerts	All
(Spain) AVF	19	(Czech Republic) Josef Záruba	All
(Spain) AVF	20	(United Kingdom) Matthew Graham	All
(Spain) AVF	21	(South Africa) Nicholas Surguladze	1–2
(Spain) AVF	22	(Spain) Iñigo Bikuña	4–7
(Spain) AVF	25	(France) Jules Gounon	4–7
(Belgium) KTR	23	(Thailand) Alexander Albon	1, 5–6
(Belgium) KTR	24	(United Kingdom) Gregor Ramsay	1, 5–6
(Belgium) KTR	25	(France) Jules Gounon	1
(Belgium) KTR	36	(South Africa) Callan O'Keeffe	7
(Denmark) KEO Racing	26	(Mexico) Fabian Welter	1
(United Kingdom) Fortec Motorsports	31	(United Kingdom) Seb Morris	All
(United Kingdom) Fortec Motorsports	32	(Mexico) Jorge Cevallos	1–3
(United Kingdom) Fortec Motorsports	33	(United Kingdom) Ben Barnicoat	All
(United Kingdom) Fortec Motorsports	34	(Croatia) Martin Kodrić	All
(Italy) Brixia Horse Power	39	(Italy) Andrea Baiguera	1, 4
(Slovenia) AS Motorsport by GSK	40	(Ukraine) Danyil Pronenko	1
(Slovenia) AS Motorsport by GSK	48	(Italy) Matteo Cairoli	1
(Finland) PositiOne	41	(Finland) Leopold Ringbom	1–3
(Finland) PositiOne	42	(Finland) Lassi Halminen	2
(Finland) PositiOne	50	(Finland) Harri Salminen	3–7
(Italy) Euronova	43	(Italy) Salvatore De Plano	3
(Italy) Euronova	44	(United Kingdom) Sennan Fielding	2
(Italy) Euronova	45	(Poland) Jakub Dalewski	1
(Italy) Euronova	46	(Japan) Ukyo Sasahara	All
(Italy) Euronova	51	(Italy) Michele La Rosa	4–5
(Italy) Euronova	53	(Russia) Ivan Matveev	6–7
(Germany) SL Formula Racing	49	(Switzerland) Cédric Freiburghaus	2, 4

== Race calendar and results ==
The seven-event calendar for the 2014 season was announced on 12 December 2013.

Round		Circuit	Date	Pole position	Fastest lap	Winning driver	Winning team	Event
1	R1	(Italy) Autodromo Nazionale Monza	12 April	(Switzerland) Louis Delétraz	(Japan) Ukyo Sasahara	(Switzerland) Louis Delétraz	(Germany) Josef Kaufmann Racing	Blancpain Endurance Series
1	R2	(Italy) Autodromo Nazionale Monza	13 April	(Switzerland) Kevin Jörg	(Switzerland) Kevin Jörg	(Switzerland) Kevin Jörg	(Germany) Josef Kaufmann Racing	Blancpain Endurance Series
2	R1	(United Kingdom) Silverstone Circuit	24 May	(France) Aurélien Panis	(Switzerland) Levin Amweg	(Switzerland) Levin Amweg	(France) ART Junior Team	Blancpain Endurance Series
2	R2	(United Kingdom) Silverstone Circuit	25 May	(United Kingdom) Seb Morris	(United Kingdom) Ben Barnicoat	(United Kingdom) Seb Morris	(United Kingdom) Fortec Motorsports	Blancpain Endurance Series
3	R1	(Germany) Hockenheimring	14 June	(Sweden) Gustav Malja	(Switzerland) Levin Amweg	(Sweden) Gustav Malja	(Germany) Josef Kaufmann Racing	Stuttgarter Rössle Hockenheimring
3	R2	(Germany) Hockenheimring	15 June	(United Kingdom) Ben Barnicoat	(South Africa) Callan O'Keeffe	(United Kingdom) Ben Barnicoat	(United Kingdom) Fortec Motorsports	Stuttgarter Rössle Hockenheimring
3	R3	(Germany) Hockenheimring	15 June	(France) Aurélien Panis	(South Africa) Callan O'Keeffe	(France) Aurélien Panis	(France) ART Junior Team	Stuttgarter Rössle Hockenheimring
4	R1	(Belgium) Circuit de Spa-Francorchamps	25 July	(Switzerland) Kevin Jörg	(Switzerland) Kevin Jörg	(Switzerland) Kevin Jörg	(Germany) Josef Kaufmann Racing	Blancpain Endurance Series (Spa 24 Hours)
4	R2	(Belgium) Circuit de Spa-Francorchamps	26 July	(Switzerland) Kevin Jörg	(Switzerland) Kevin Jörg	(Netherlands) Steijn Schothorst	(Netherlands) Manor MP Motorsport	Blancpain Endurance Series (Spa 24 Hours)
5	R1	(Netherlands) TT Circuit Assen	2 August	(South Africa) Callan O'Keeffe	(South Africa) Callan O'Keeffe	(South Africa) Callan O'Keeffe	(France) ART Junior Team	Gamma Racing Day
5	R2	(Netherlands) TT Circuit Assen	3 August	(United Kingdom) Seb Morris	(United Kingdom) Seb Morris	(United Kingdom) Seb Morris	(United Kingdom) Fortec Motorsports	Gamma Racing Day
6	R1	(Czech Republic) Autodrom Most	30 August	(United Kingdom) Seb Morris	(Sweden) Gustav Malja	(United Kingdom) Ben Barnicoat	(United Kingdom) Fortec Motorsports	ADAC Truck Grand Prix
6	R2	(Czech Republic) Autodrom Most	31 August	(United Kingdom) Raoul Owens	(Thailand) Alexander Albon	(Thailand) Alexander Albon	(Belgium) KTR	ADAC Truck Grand Prix
6	R3	(Czech Republic) Autodrom Most	31 August	Race postponed due to heavy rain				ADAC Truck Grand Prix
7	R1	(Germany) Nürburgring	19 September	(France) Andrea Pizzitola	(France) Andrea Pizzitola	(France) Andrea Pizzitola	(Netherlands) Manor MP Motorsport	Blancpain Endurance Series (1000 km Nürburgring)
7	R2	(Germany) Nürburgring	20 September	(Czech Republic) Josef Záruba	(Sweden) Gustav Malja	(Sweden) Gustav Malja	(Germany) Josef Kaufmann Racing	Blancpain Endurance Series (1000 km Nürburgring)
7	R3	(Germany) Nürburgring	21 September	(France) Andrea Pizzitola	Race cancelled due to fog			Blancpain Endurance Series (1000 km Nürburgring)

== Championship standings ==
=== Drivers' championship ===
- Championship points were awarded on a 30, 24, 20, 17, 16, 15, 14, 13, 12, 11, 10, 9, 8, 7, 6, 5, 4, 3, 2, 1 to the top 20 classified finishers in each race.

Pos	Driver	MNZ (Italy)		SIL (United Kingdom)		HOC (Germany)			SPA (Belgium)		ASS (Netherlands)		MST (Czech Republic)			NÜR (Germany)			Points
Pos	Driver	1	2	3	4	5	6	7	8	9	10	11	12	13	14	15	16	17	Points
1	(United Kingdom) Ben Barnicoat	9	4	6	18	2	**1**	6	2	5	2	Ret	1	7	C	4	4	C	258
2	(Switzerland) Louis Delétraz	**1**	2	13	21	4	6	8	3	2	8	3	4	10	C	7	5	C	242
3	(United Kingdom) Seb Morris	15	7	14	**1**	21	5	9	8	Ret	4	**1**	**3**	3	C	2	6	C	224
4	(Netherlands) Steijn Schothorst	5	3	5	3	9	2	7	4	1	Ret	7	Ret	4	C	11	7	C	224
5	(Sweden) Gustav Malja	Ret	Ret	4	DNS	**1**	9	4	6	3	3	5	21	6	C	20	1	C	193
6	(Japan) Ukyo Sasahara	2	Ret	10	7	8	18	5	7	4	9	4	8	9	C	5	12	C	191
7	(South Africa) Callan O'Keeffe	Ret	25	8	2	5	4	2	Ret	14	**1**	8	9	5	C	16	11	C	187
8	(United Kingdom) Jake Hughes	Ret	26	3	5	7	8	10	10	9	16	11	7	22	C	6	10	C	152
9	(United States) Ryan Tveter	Ret	15	15	6	12	11	11	5	15	6	2	12	11	C	15	13	C	150
10	(United Kingdom) Raoul Owens	8	9	7	20	NC	10	12	11	Ret	Ret	12	15	**2**	C	12	14	C	125
11	(Austria) Stefan Riener	22	24	11	9	10	7	Ret	9	7	10	6	10	Ret	C	8	24	C	123
12	(United Kingdom) Matthew Graham	19	6	9	4	Ret	23	19	13	6	7	DSQ	13	16	C	13	8	C	119
13	(Switzerland) Kevin Jörg	7	**1**						**1**	**20**			5	14	C	3	DNS	C	118
14	(France) Andrea Pizzitola	3	5	WD	WD								6	8	C	**1**	3	**C**	114
15	(Switzerland) Levin Amweg	4	27	1	Ret	3	3	3											107
16	(Czech Republic) Josef Záruba	14	10	21	12	13	16	Ret	17	21†	12	Ret	11	13	C	9	**2**	C	107
17	(Thailand) Alexander Albon	6	18								5	Ret	2	1	C				88
18	(Croatia) Martin Kodrić	12	28	WD	WD	11	12	Ret	18	13	18	9	16	12	C	14	16	C	80
19	(France) Aurélien Panis	Ret	Ret	**2**	Ret	6	13	**1**											77
20	(Sweden) Robin Hansson	Ret	21	19	8	15	15	13	16	8	13	14	Ret	18	C	Ret	17	C	75
21	(Netherlands) Roy Geerts	Ret	13	12	Ret	14	22	Ret	14	10	11	10	Ret	17	C	Ret	15	C	73
22	(Ecuador) Julio Moreno	17	17	16	13	20	17	16	12	16	17	16	Ret	15	C	19	21	C	62
23	(France) Jules Gounon	Ret	14						15	11	14	DSQ	20	25	C	10	9	C	54
24	(United Kingdom) Gregor Ramsay	10	8								15	15	14	24	C				43
25	(Mexico) Jorge Cevallos	Ret	22	17	10	17	14	15											32
26	(Finland) Leopold Ringbom	13	12	Ret	16	Ret	19	14											31
27	(Sweden) Philip Morin	21	16	20	11	16	Ret	17											25
28	(Switzerland) Cédric Freiburghaus			18	15				22	12			17	19	C				24
29	(Poland) Jakub Dalewski	11	11																20
30	(Germany) Philip Hamprecht										19	13				17	20	C	15
31	(Russia) Ivan Matveev												18	20	C	18	18	C	10
32	(United States) Robert Siska			DNS	19	18	21	18								DNS	23	C	8
33	(Finland) Lassi Halminen			22	14														7
34	(Ukraine) Danyil Pronenko	16	19																7
35	(Italy) Andrea Baiguera	Ret	Ret						19	17									6
36	(Finland) Harri Salminen					22	20	Ret	21	19	21	18	DNS	21	C	22	22	C	6
37	(Canada) David Richert	20	23	WD	WD				24	18			19	23	C				6
38	(Italy) Michele la Rosa								20	Ret	22	17							5
39	(Spain) Iñigo Bikuña								23	DNS	20	19	Ret	Ret	C	21	19	C	5
40	(Germany) Max Biedermann	WD	WD	24	17														4
41	(South Africa) Nicholas Surguladze	18	20	23	22														4
42	(Italy) Salvatore De Plano					19	Ret	20											3
	(United Kingdom) Sennan Fielding			DNS	DNS														0
	(Mexico) Fabian Welter	WD	WD																0
	(Australia) James Allen	WD	WD																0
	(Italy) Matteo Cairoli	WD	WD																0
Pos	Driver	MNZ (Italy)		SIL (United Kingdom)		HOC (Germany)			SPA (Belgium)		ASS (Netherlands)		MST (Czech Republic)			NÜR (Germany)			Points

Colour	Result
Gold	Winner
Silver	Second place
Bronze	Third place
Green	Points classification
Blue	Non-points classification
Blue	Non-classified finish (NC)
Purple	Retired, not classified (Ret)
Red	Did not qualify (DNQ)
Red	Did not pre-qualify (DNPQ)
Black	Disqualified (DSQ)
White	Did not start (DNS)
White	Withdrew (WD)
White	Race cancelled (C)
Blank	Did not practice (DNP)
Blank	Did not arrive (DNA)
Blank	Excluded (EX)

**Bold** – Pole
Italics – Fastest Lap

=== Teams' championship ===
Pos	Team	MNZ (Italy)		SIL (United Kingdom)		HOC (Germany)			SPA (Belgium)		ASS (Netherlands)		MST (Czech Republic)			NÜR (Germany)			Points
1	(Germany) Josef Kaufmann Racing	1	1	4	6	1	6	4	1	2	3	2	4	6	C	3	1	C	334
2	(United Kingdom) Fortec Motorsports	9	4	6	1	2	1	6	2	5	2	1	1	3	C	2	4	C	328
3	(Netherlands) Manor MP Motorsport	3	3	5	3	9	2	7	4	1	17	7	6	4	C	1	3	C	273
4	(France) ART Junior Team	4	25	1	2	3	3	1	Ret	17	1	8	7	5	C	6	10	C	255
5	(Italy) Euronova	2	11	10	7	8	18	5	7	4	9	4	8	9	C	5	12	C	201
6	(United Kingdom) Mark Burdett Motorsport	8	9	3	5	7	8	10	10	9	16	11	15	2	C	12	14	C	185
7	(Spain) AVF	14	6	9	4	13	16	19	13	6	7	19	11	13	C	9	2	C	167
8	(Austria) Speedfish Racing	22	24	11	9	10	7	Ret	9	7	10	6	10	Ret	C	8	24	C	132
9	(Belgium) KTR	6	8								5	15	1	2	C	16	11	C	119
10	(Sweden) Fragus BR Motorsport	Ret	21	19	8	15	15	13	16	8	13	14	17	18	C	Ret	17	C	78
11	(Finland) PositiOne	13	12	Ret	14	22	19	14	21	19	21	18	DNS	21	C	22	22	C	38
12	(Poland) Inter Europol	20	23	24	17	18	21	18	24	18	19	13	19	23	C	17	20	C	29
13	(Germany) SL Formula Racing			18	15				22	13									19
14	(Slovenia) AS Motorsport by GSK	16	19																7
15	(Italy) Brixia Horse Power	Ret	Ret								19	17							4
	(Denmark) KEO Racing	WD	WD																0
Pos	Team	MNZ (Italy)		SIL (United Kingdom)		HOC (Germany)			SPA (Belgium)		ASS (Netherlands)		MST (Czech Republic)			NÜR (Germany)			Points

Colour	Result
Gold	Winner
Silver	Second place
Bronze	Third place
Green	Points classification
Blue	Non-points classification
Blue	Non-classified finish (NC)
Purple	Retired, not classified (Ret)
Red	Did not qualify (DNQ)
Red	Did not pre-qualify (DNPQ)
Black	Disqualified (DSQ)
White	Did not start (DNS)
White	Withdrew (WD)
White	Race cancelled (C)
Blank	Did not practice (DNP)
Blank	Did not arrive (DNA)
Blank	Excluded (EX)

**Bold** – Pole
Italics – Fastest Lap
