= Lilou Wadoux =

French racing driver (born 2001)

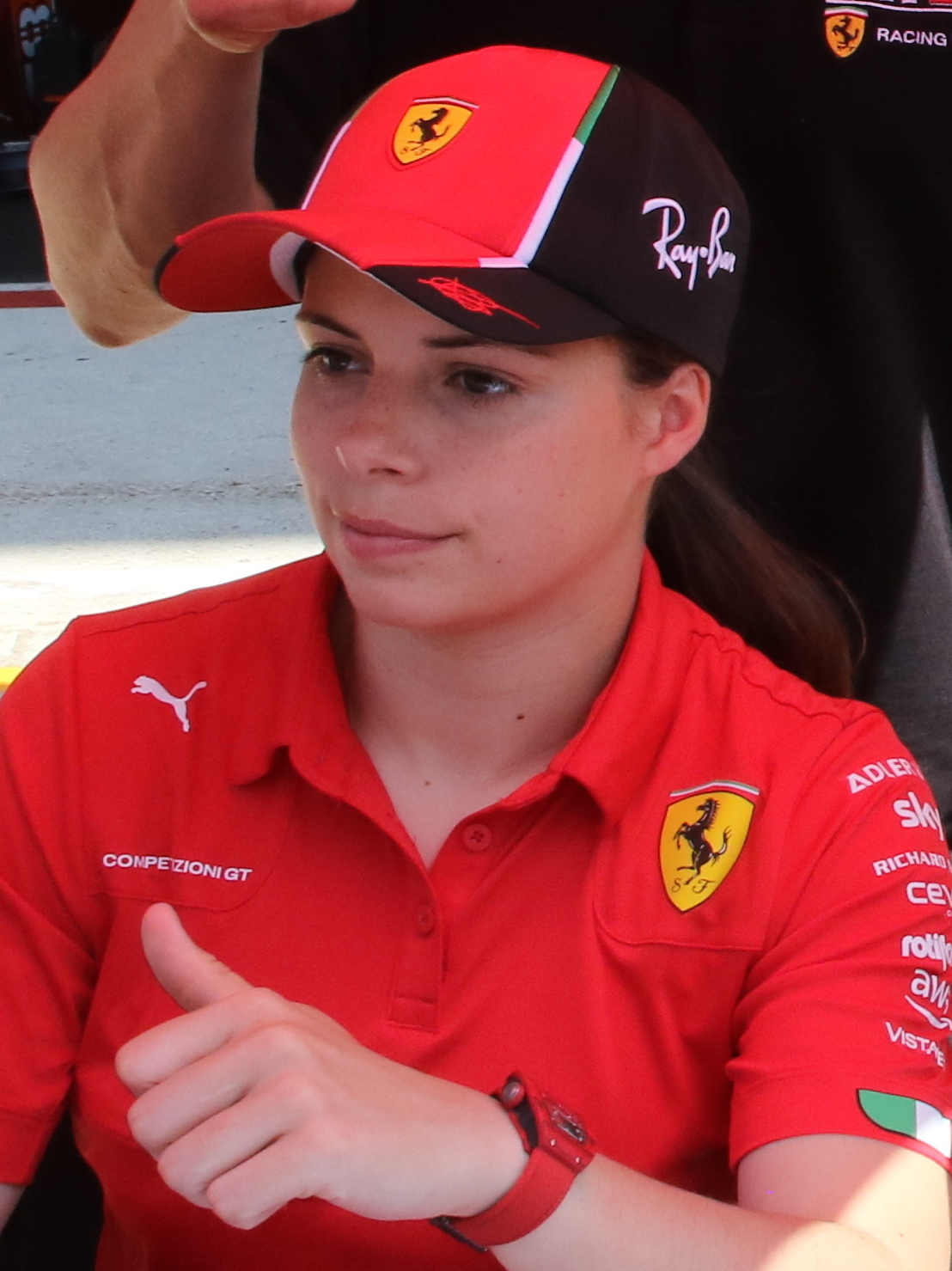
- Wadoux in 2023
- Nationality: (France) French
- Born: Lilou Chloé Perrine Wadoux-Ducellier; 10 April 2001 (age 25) Amiens, France

FIA World Endurance Championship career
- Debut season: 2022
- Current team: Richard Mille AF Corse
- Categorisation: FIA Silver
- Car number: 83
- Former teams: Richard Mille Racing Team
- Starts: 9 (9 entries)
- Wins: 1
- Podiums: 2
- Poles: 0
- Fastest laps: 0
- Best finish: 12th (LMP2) in 2022

Previous series
- 2024 2022–2023 2020–2021 2019 2019: Super GT Series; FIA World Endurance Championship; Alpine Elf Europa Cup; Clio Cup France; TCR Europe Touring Car Series

Championship titles
- 2025: IMSA Michelin Endurance Cup - GTD

Lilou Chloé Perrine Wadoux-Ducellier (born 10 April 2001) is a French professional racing driver. She is a Ferrari factory driver, and the first woman to win an FIA World Endurance Championship race. Wadoux is also an IMSA GTD champion, LMP2 race winner and Hypercar test driver. Wadoux made her WEC debut for Richard Mille's team in 2022, before joining AF Corse and Ferrari in 2023.

== Career ==
=== Early career ===
Though her father Cédric was briefly a rally driver, Wadoux spent her youth competing in tennis. She only started karting, mostly for fun, at the late age of 14. Aided by fellow Amiens racing drivers Julien and Florian Briché, she made the jump to competitive circuit racing two years later, in 2017. Starting out in the French lower-division one-make saloon car championships, Wadoux encountered success from early on, with an eighth place (runner-up in the junior class) in the Peugeot 208 Racing Cup followed by 3rd overall the following year. Her 2018 season also included four top-ten finishes from four guest starts in the superior Peugeot 308 Racing Cup, as well as an appearance in a two-day test organised by the FIA Women in Motorsport Commission in Navarra for 15 female racers.

2019 would see Wadoux make the step up to the TCR Europe Touring Car Series with a Peugeot 308 TCR from Briché's JSB Compétition team. However, her season was cut short due to a crash in the third round of the season at Spa-Francorchamps. She was hit by Qatari driver Abdulla Al-Khelaifi, who had lost control of his Cupra León TCR after an off at turn 16, and her car rolled several times before it finally came to a stop. She was unharmed, but the financial difficulties following the crash meant she was not able to return to the championship. She returned to racing in October that year, with a one-off appearance in the Clio Cup France at Circuit Paul Ricard that yielded a podium finish.

=== Alpine Elf Europa Cup ===
In 2020, Wadoux switched to the one-make Alpine Elf Europa Cup, driving an Alpine A110 for Autosport GP. She had a consistent debut season, finishing all ten races in the top-ten with eight junior podiums, but had to settle for seventh in the overall standings.

2021 would prove to be Wadoux's breakthrough year. Continuing in the Alpine Elf Europa Cup with Autosport GP, she finished eight of the 12 races on the overall podium and was part of a three-way title fight with reigning champion Jean-Baptiste Mela and single-seater graduate Ugo de Wilde that went down to the wire. She won one race at the season finale in Portimão and eventually finished third overall, second in the junior standings.

A highlight of Wadoux's 2021 season came at the Circuit de la Sarthe in August. Racing in the 24 Hours of Le Mans-supporting round of the Porsche Sprint Challenge France, in a car and circuit she was new to, Wadoux set pole position by a full three seconds and dominated the race from lights to flag.

=== Endurance racing ===
==== LMP2 debut (2022) ====
Wadoux at Le Mans in 2022.

In November 2021, Wadoux, as well as W Series drivers Jamie Chadwick and Alice Powell, was invited by the all-female LMP2 Richard Mille Racing Team to take part in the post-season FIA World Endurance Championship rookie test at Bahrain. She was hired for the 2022 season as part of the team's switch to a mixed lineup, alongside ELMS champion Charles Milesi and eight-time World Rally Champion Sébastien Ogier. The trio completed the opening three rounds together, ending with sixth place at the 24 Hours of Le Mans, before experienced LMP2 racer Paul-Loup Chatin took over from Ogier – Chatin serving as a mentor for Wadoux. At Monza, the trio were running in third place with just over two hours to go when Robert Kubica tagged Chatin into a spin, damaging the car's gearbox. After eighth place in the final two events at Fuji and Bahrain, Wadoux and Milesi finished 12th in the standings with 30 points.

In late 2022, Wadoux was named as one of four drivers to be invited by the WEC to take part in the post-season rookie test at Bahrain. She drove Toyota's title-winning Hypercar and thus became the first woman to drive a top-class prototype since Vanina Ickx in 2011.

==== Ferrari (2023–present) ====
===== 2023 =====
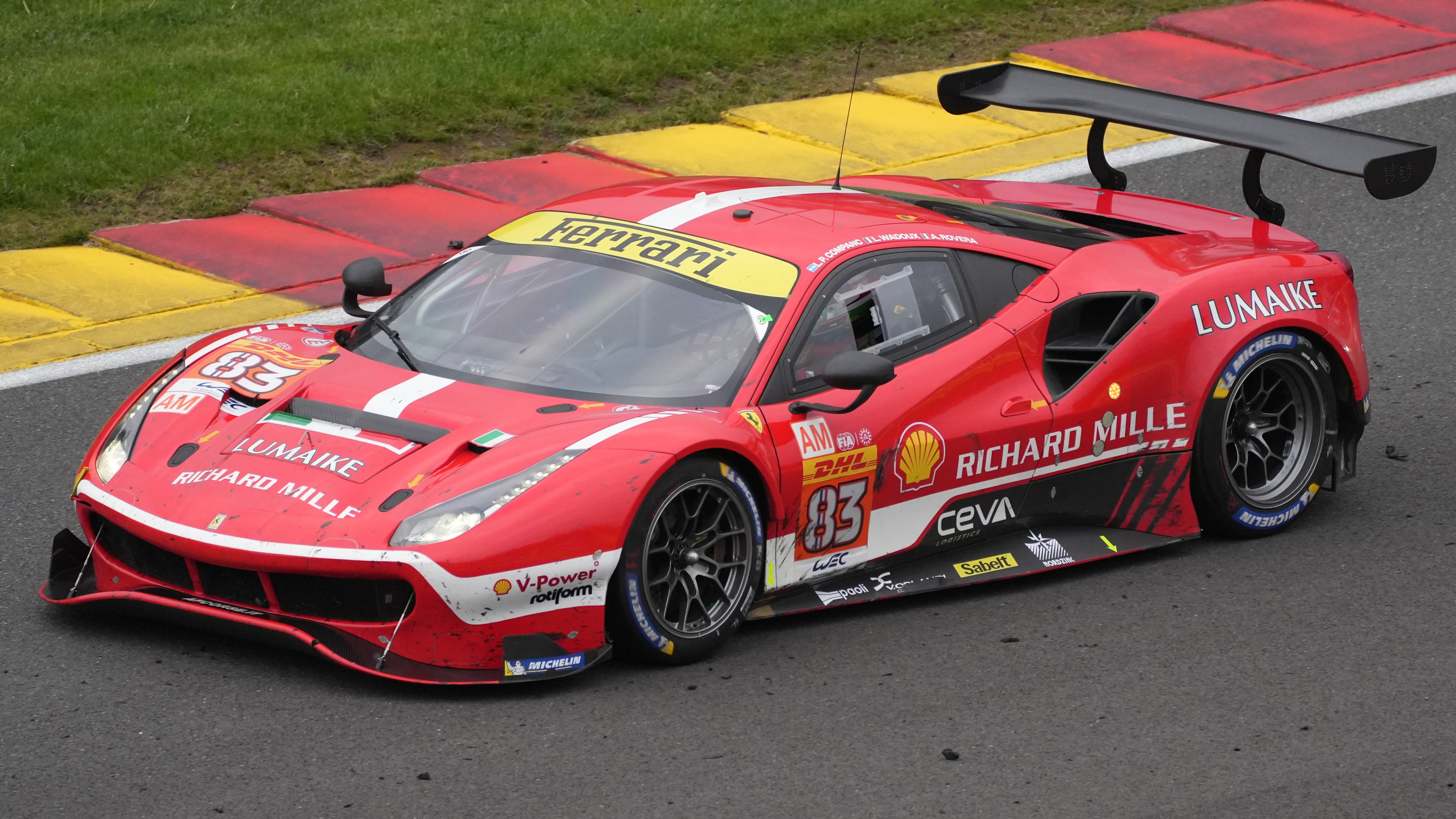
Wadoux's 2023 6 Hours of Spa victory was the first for a woman in WEC.

In 2023, Wadoux signed as Ferrari's first-ever female factory driver, competing for AF Corse in the GTE Am category alongside bronze-rated Luis Pérez Companc and fellow factory driver Alessio Rovera. The campaign started out in disappointing fashion, as teammate Companc crashed spectacularly in the opening laps of the 1000 Miles of Sebring, forcing the team to retire. The No. 83 crew bounced back to finish a close second at the 2023 6 Hours of Portimão, before winning the following race at Spa-Francorchamps – Wadoux becoming the first female race winner in the WEC in any class. The trio eventually finished eighth in the standings after a run of bad fortune in the final few races.

In November, Wadoux featured at the Bahrain test again, this time driving Ferrari's Le Mans-winning 499P Hypercar. She placed third out of the 18 drivers, only behind Robert Shwartzman and Jota's Norman Nato.

===== 2024 =====
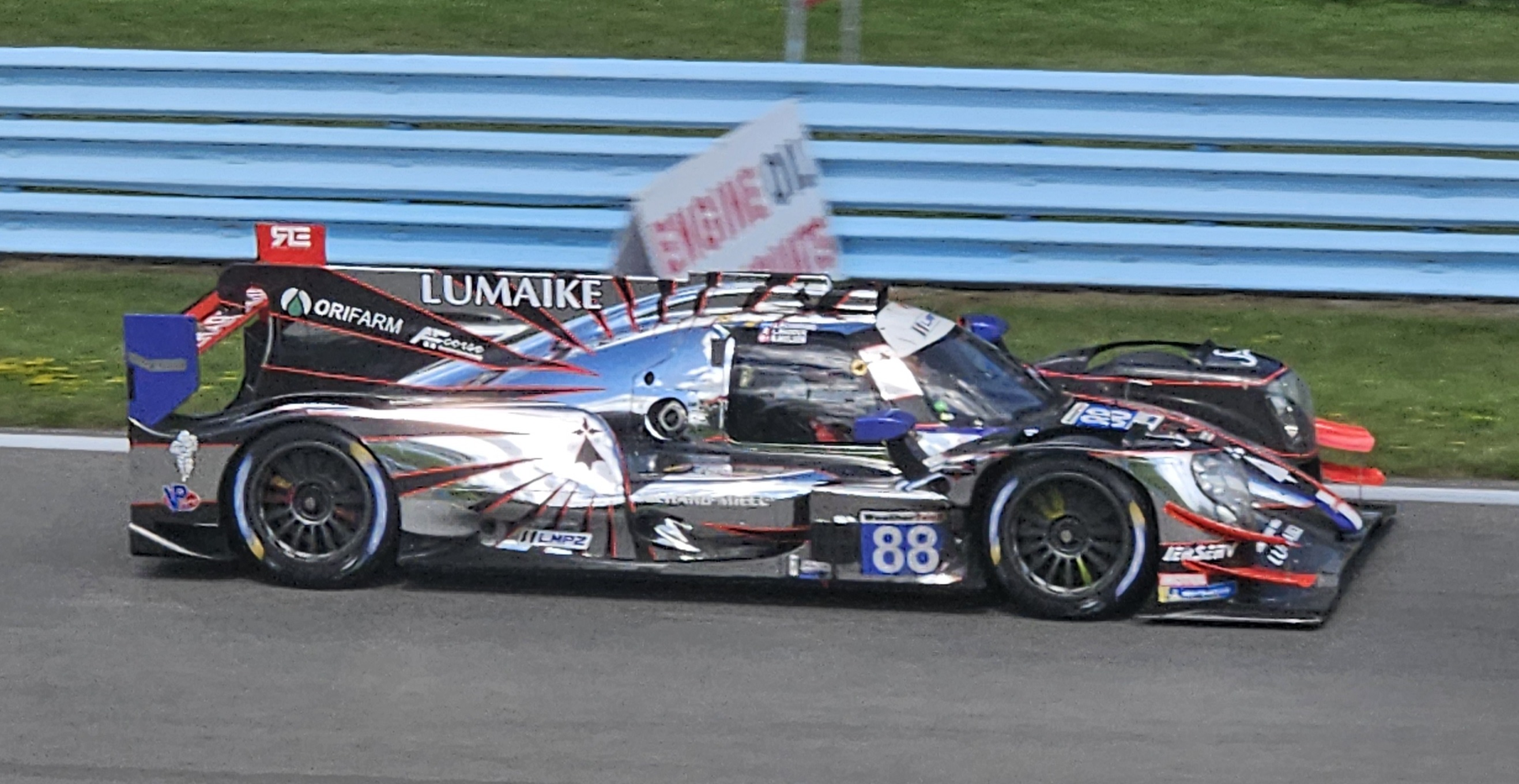
Wadoux made her IMSA debut in 2023 at Watkins Glen. One year later at the same venue, she achieved her first LMP2 win.

Wadoux embarked on a new challenge in 2024 as she moved to the Japanese Super GT series. Racing with the GAINER-run PONOS Racing squad, she shared a Ferrari 296 GT3 in the GT300 class with veteran Kei Cozzolino, and secured second place at a wet Sportsland Sugo race – the first female podium in the series since 1995. In parallel, Wadoux competed in the endurance rounds of the IMSA SportsCar Championship in LMP2 with AF Corse, partnering Pérez Companc and Nicklas Nielsen. After two races where the team encountered trouble, Wadoux scored her first LMP2 victory at the 6 Hours of Watkins Glen, taking the car from third place to the lead during her stint and being praised by Le Mans winner Nielsen for her pace.

===== 2025 =====
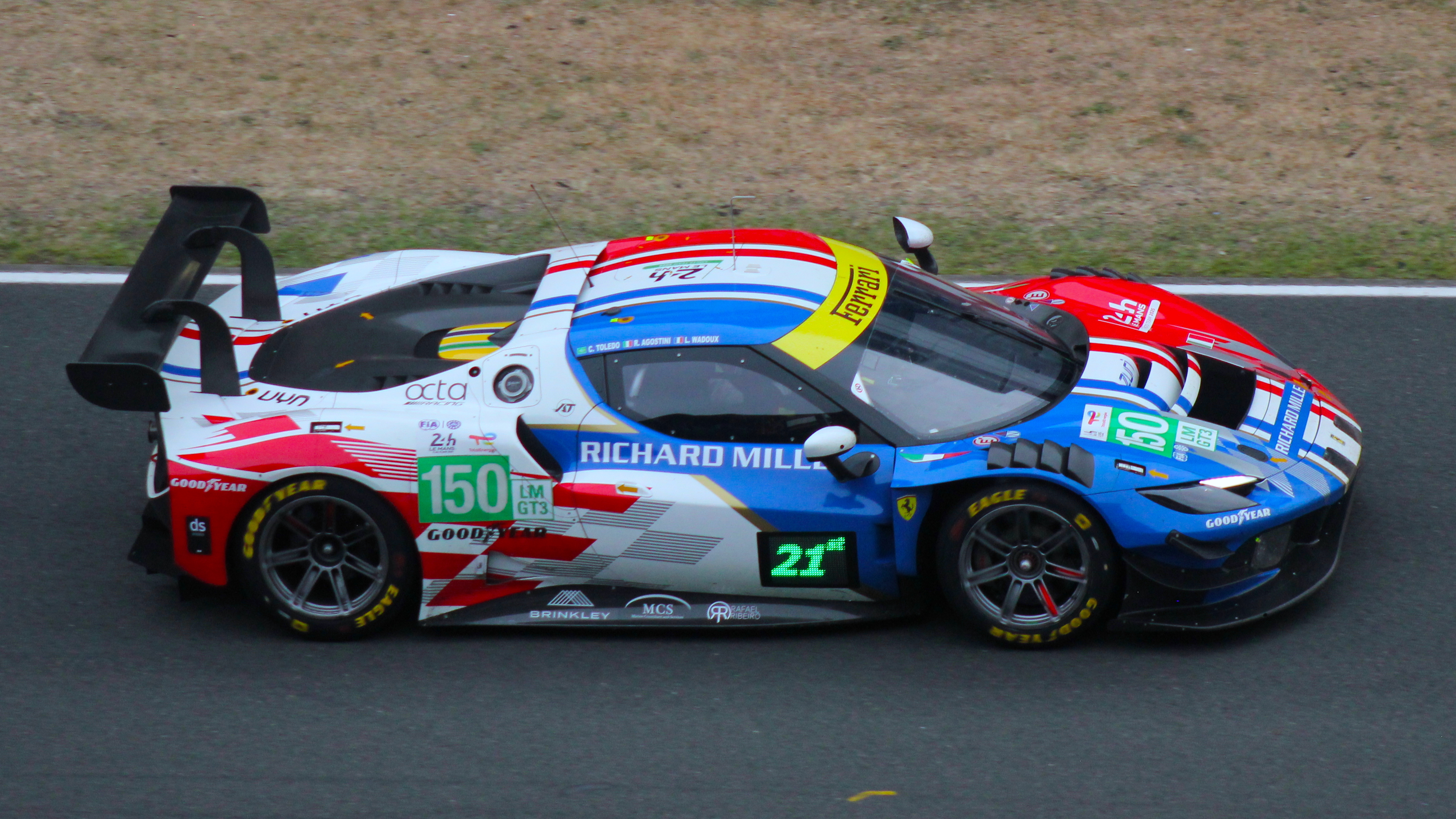
Wadoux's No. 150 car at the 2025 24 Hours of Le Mans.

Initially poised to remain in Super GT in 2025, Wadoux parted ways with PONOS just days before the start of the season to focus on a dual ELMS and IMSA campaign with AF Corse. She secured a home win in only her second European Le Mans Series start, charging from fifth to first in a fuel-efficient drive at Le Castellet. Another recovery drive under heavy rain at Silverstone yielded a second victory – helping Wadoux, Riccardo Agostini and Custodio Toledo finish runner-up in LMGT3. Wadoux saw more success stateside, dominating Petit Le Mans in GTD and winning the IMSA Michelin Endurance Cup title alongside Simon Mann and Alessandro Pier Guidi – she became the first female IMSA champion since Christina Nielsen in 2017. After the season, Wadoux was shortlisted by Dailysportscar for its annual GT Driver of the Year award.

In November, Wadoux had her third taste of Hypercar machinery at WEC's Bahrain rookie test. She was third-fastest behind Alpine's António Félix da Costa and Peugeot's Nick Cassidy, outpacing the sister 499Ps of Ollie Gray and Alessio Rovera by over six tenths.

===== 2026 =====
In early 2026, Wadoux signed a multi-year contract extension with Ferrari. She returned to ELMS and IMSA, as well as driving a full season of the GT World Challenge Europe Endurance Cup in the Pro Cup. Wadoux called the chance to race in three championships simultaneously "a privilege", stating that she felt "close to being ready" for a Ferrari Hypercar seat. At the 12 Hours of Sebring, Wadoux, Mann and Antonio Fuoco achieved the first major win for the Evo-spec Ferrari 296, as Fuoco recovered from three drive-through penalties to make a last-lap overtake for the lead on Tom Gamble, having closed up to the pack with a late safety car. At the 24 Hours of Spa, Wadoux finished fifth overall with teammates Arthur Leclerc and Sean Gelael. Wadoux then took pole position on her return to IMSA at Road America – the first for a woman since 2018 – before Fuoco copped a stop-go penalty while leading the last race at Road Atlanta. In ELMS, a calendar clash and several crashes for Toledo prevented Wadoux from driving in four of the six rounds. She then qualified second in the GTWCE finale at Portimão, but was spun by Jordan Pepper in the race – the No. 50 crew ultimately recovering to tenth.

=== Formula E ===
Wadoux was set to take part in the Formula E women's test at the Circuito del Jarama in Madrid ahead of the 2024–25 season, driving for Jaguar TCS Racing. However, issues with the seat insert prevented her participation.

== Personal life ==
In her early teenage years before taking up racing, Wadoux competed in tennis. She says her idols are tennis player Rafael Nadal and Formula One world champion Ayrton Senna, whom her father, an amateur rally driver, admired in the 90s.

== Racing record ==
=== Racing career summary ===
Season	Series	Team	Races	Wins	Poles	F/Laps	Podiums	Points	Position
2017	Peugeot 208 Racing Cup	N/A	?	?	?	?	?	?	8th
2018	Peugeot 208 Racing Cup	N/A	?	?	?	?	?	?	**3rd**
2018	Peugeot 308 Racing Cup	JSB Compétition	4	0	0	0	0	0	NC†
2019	TCR Europe Touring Car Series	JSB Compétition	5	0	0	0	0	0	44th
2019	Clio Cup France	GPA Racing	2	0	0	0	1	0	NC†
2020	Alpine Elf Europa Cup	Autosport GP	10	0	0	1	0	65	7th
2021	Alpine Elf Europa Cup	Patrick Roger Autosport GP	12	1	0	1	8	156	**3rd**
2021	Porsche Sprint Challenge Le Mans	CLRT	1	1	1	1	1	N/A	**1st**
2022	FIA World Endurance Championship - LMP2	Richard Mille Racing Team	6	0	0	0	0	30	12th
2022	24 Hours of Le Mans - LMP2	Richard Mille Racing Team	1	0	0	0	0	—N/a	9th
2023	FIA World Endurance Championship - LMGTE Am	Richard Mille AF Corse	7	1	0	0	2	56	8th
2023	24 Hours of Le Mans - LMGTE Am	Richard Mille AF Corse	1	0	0	0	0	—N/a	DNF
2023	IMSA SportsCar Championship - LMP2	AF Corse	1	0	0	0	0	250	30th
2023	GT World Challenge Europe Endurance Cup - Silver	AF Corse	1	0	0	0	1	15	17th
2023	GT World Challenge Europe Endurance Cup - Bronze	AF Corse	1	0	0	0	0	8	28th
2023	Gulf 12 Hours - GT3 Am	AF Corse	1	0	0	0	0	N/A	4th
2023	GT World Challenge America - Pro	Conquest Racing	1	0	0	0	0	0	NC
2024	Super GT - GT300	PONOS Racing	8	0	0	0	1	22	12th
2024	IMSA SportsCar Championship - LMP2	Richard Mille AF Corse	4	1	0	0	1	1059	25th
2024	GT World Challenge Europe Endurance Cup - Bronze	Sky – Tempesta Racing	1	0	0	0	0	31	13th
2025	European Le Mans Series - LMGT3	Richard Mille AF Corse	6	2	0	0	2	70	**2nd**
2025	24 Hours of Le Mans - LMGT3	Richard Mille AF Corse	1	0	0	0	0	—N/a	11th
2025	IMSA SportsCar Championship - GTD	AF Corse	5	1	1	1	1	1163	24th
2025	Super GT - GT300	PONOS Racing	0	0	0	0	0	0	NC
2026	GT World Challenge Europe Endurance Cup	AF Corse	5	0	0	0	0	11	23rd
2026	IMSA SportsCar Championship - GTD	AF Corse USA	4	1	1	0	1	1178	32nd
2026	European Le Mans Series - LMGT3	Richard Mille AF Corse	4	0	0	0	0	10	29th
2026	24 Hours of Le Mans - LMGT3	Richard Mille AF Corse	1	0	0	0	0	N/A	8th

^{†} As Wadoux was a guest driver, she was ineligible to score points.
* Season still in progress.

=== Complete Alpine Elf Europa Cup results ===
(key) (Races in bold indicate pole position) (Races in italics indicate fastest lap)

Year	Team	1	2	3	4	5	6	7	8	9	10	11	12	Pos	Points
2020	Autosport GP	NOG; 1; 7	NOG; 2; 6	NOG; 3; 8	MAG; 1; 4	MAG; 2; 4	LEC; 1; 7	LEC; 2; 5	LEC; 3; 7	POR; 1; 4	POR; 2; 7			7th	65
2021	Patrick Roger Autosport GP	NOG; 1; 3	NOG; 2; 2	MAG; 1; 5	MAG; 2; 3	SPA; 1; 4	SPA; 2; 3	CAT; 1; 2	CAT; 2; 4	LEC; 1; 6	LEC; 2; 2	POR; 1; 1	POR; 2; 2	3rd	156

=== Complete FIA World Endurance Championship results ===
(key) (Races in bold indicate pole position; races in italics indicate fastest lap)

Year	Entrant	Class	Car	Engine	1	2	3	4	5	6	7	Rank	Points
2022	Richard Mille Racing Team	LMP2	Oreca 07	Gibson GK428 4.2 L V8	SEB; 12	SPA; 8	LMS; 6	MNZ; 14	FUJ; 8	BHR; 8		12th	30
2023	Richard Mille AF Corse	LMGTE Am	Ferrari 488 GTE Evo	Ferrari F154CB 3.9 L Turbo V8	SEB; Ret	PRT; 2	SPA; 1	LMS; Ret	MNZ; 6	FUJ; 9	BHR; 9	8th	56

^{*} Season still in progress.

=== Complete 24 Hours of Le Mans results ===
Year	Team	Co-Drivers	Car	Class	Laps	Pos.	Class Pos.
2022	(France) Richard Mille Racing Team	(France) Charles Milesi (France) Sébastien Ogier	Oreca 07-Gibson	LMP2	366	13th	9th
2023	(Italy) Richard Mille AF Corse	(Argentina) Luis Pérez Companc (Italy) Alessio Rovera	Ferrari 488 GTE Evo	GTE; Am	33	DNF	DNF
2025	(Italy) Richard Mille AF Corse	(Italy) Riccardo Agostini (Brazil) Custodio Toledo	Ferrari 296 GT3	LMGT3	338	43rd	11th
2026	(Italy) Richard Mille AF Corse	(Italy) Riccardo Agostini (Brazil) Custodio Toledo	Ferrari 296 GT3 Evo	LMGT3	334	40th	8th

=== Complete IMSA SportsCar Championship results ===
(key) (Races in bold indicate pole position; results in italics indicate fastest lap)

Year	Team	Class	Make	Engine	1	2	3	4	5	6	7	8	9	10	Rank	Points	Ref
2023	AF Corse	LMP2	Oreca 07	Gibson GK428 4.2 L V8	DAY	SEB	LGA	WGL; 6	ELK	IMS	PET				30th	250	
2024	Richard Mille AF Corse	LMP2	Oreca 07	Gibson GK428 4.2 L V8	DAY; 12	SEB; 13	WGL; 1	MOS	ELK	IMS	PET; 6				25th	1059	
2025	AF Corse	GTD	Ferrari 296 GT3	Ferrari F163CE 3.0 L Turbo V6	DAY; 16	**SEB**; 16	LBH	LGA	WGL; 5	MOS	ELK	VIR	IMS; 18	PET; 1	24th	1163	
2026	AF Corse USA	GTD	Ferrari 296 GT3 Evo	Ferrari F163CE 3.0 L Turbo V6	DAY; 5	SEB; 1	LBH	LGA	WGL	MOS	**ELK**; 11	VIR	IMS	PET; 6	32nd	1178	

=== Complete GT World Challenge Europe results ===
==== GT World Challenge Europe Endurance Cup ====
(key) (Races in bold indicate pole position; results in italics indicate fastest lap)

Year	Team	Car	Class	1	2	3	4	5	6	7	Pos.	Points
2023	AF Corse	Ferrari 488 GT3 Evo 2020	Bronze	MNZ	LEC	SPA; 6H; 57	SPA; 12H; 32	SPA; 24H; 26	NÜR		28th	8
2023	AF Corse	Ferrari 296 GT3	Silver							CAT; 22	17th	15
2024	Sky – Tempesta Racing	Ferrari 296 GT3	Bronze	LEC	SPA; 6H; 4	SPA; 12H; 12	SPA; 24H; 16	NÜR	MNZ	JED	13th	31
2026	AF Corse	Ferrari 296 GT3 Evo	Pro	LEC; 19	MNZ; 11	SPA; 6H; 22	SPA; 12H; 12	SPA; 24H; 5	NÜR; 40	ALG; 10	23rd	11

=== Complete Super GT results ===
(key) (Races in bold indicate pole position) (Races in italics indicate fastest lap)

Year	Team	Car	Class	1	2	3	4	5	6	7	8	9	DC	Points
2024	Ponos Racing	Ferrari 296 GT3	GT300	OKA; 11	FUJ; 9	SUZ; 6	FUJ; 11	SUG; 2	AUT; 24	MOT; 15	SUZ; 21		12th	22
2025	Ponos Racing	Ferrari 296 GT3	GT300	OKA; WD	FUJ	SEP	FS1	FS2	SUZ	SUG	AUT	MOT	NC	0

=== Complete European Le Mans Series results ===
(key) (Races in bold indicate pole position; results in italics indicate fastest lap)

Year	Entrant	Class	Chassis	Engine	1	2	3	4	5	6	Rank	Points
2025	Richard Mille AF Corse	LMGT3	Ferrari 296 GT3	Ferrari F163CE 3.0 L Turbo V6	CAT; 9	LEC; 1	IMO; 8	SPA; 5	MUG; 1	ALG; 8	2nd	70
2026	Richard Mille AF Corse	LMGT3	Ferrari 296 GT3 Evo	Ferrari F163CE 3.0 L Turbo V6	CAT	LEC; Ret	IMO; 8	SPA; Ret	SIL; WD	ALG; 7	29th	10
