= Alpine Elf Europa Cup =

One-make sports car racing series

- Category: Grand tourer sportscars
- Country: International
- Inaugural season: 2018
- Constructors: Alpine
- Engine suppliers: Nissan
- Tyre suppliers: Michelin
- Drivers' champion: (France) Charles Roussanne
- Official website: https://www.alpineelfcupseries.com/

The Alpine Elf Cup is a one-make sports car racing series founded in 2018 featuring the Alpine A110 Cup.

== Format ==
The series consists of events in various European countries which feature two races over a weekend. Each weekend the series hosts two 25 minute races plus one lap with two separate qualifying sessions determining the grid order. Teams may run one driver over the entire weekend or split the car between two drivers with one driver running the first qualifying session and race and the other running the second.

The series supports multiple other racing series depending on the round including the International GT Open, FFSA GT Championship, and the Blancpain GT Championship.

== Regulations ==
Each race consists of a field of Alpine A110 Cup cars. The A110 Cup is the only eligible model in the series and very few modifications to the car are permitted as well as Nissan MR18DDT 1.8-liter inline-four turbocharged engines. The series has two sub-categories along with the overall Drivers' Championship: Junior, for drivers under 25 years of age and Gentlemen, which is designated by the series officials but generally given to drivers over 45 years of age. At the end of the season the highest Gentleman driver in points receives an official test in an Alpine A110 GT4 racecar along with a cash prize. The highest placed Junior driver receives an official test in the Signatech-Alpine-Matmut LMP2 prototype.

== Champions ==
Season	Overall Champion	Junior Champion	Gentlemen Champion
2018	(France) Pierre Sancinéna	(France) Jean-Baptiste Mela	(France) Sylvain Noël
2019	(France) Gaël Castelli	(France) Mateo Herrero	(France) Mathieu Blaise
2020	(France) Jean-Baptiste Mela	(France) Jean-Baptiste Mela	(Belgium) Phillippe Bourgois
2021	(France) Jean-Baptiste Mela	(Belgium) Ugo de Wilde	(France) Stéphane Auriacombe
2022	(France) Lucas Frayssinet	(France) Lucas Frayssinet	(France) Anthony Fournier
2023	(Belgium) Lorens Lecertua	(Belgium) Lorens Lecertua	(France) Anthony Fournier
2024	(France) Charles Roussanne	(France) Charles Roussanne	(France) Frédéric de Brabant

== Circuits ==
- (France) Circuit Paul Ricard (2018–present)
- (Germany) Nürburgring (2018)
- (France) Circuit de Dijon-Prenois (2018, 2023, 2026)
- (United Kingdom) Silverstone Circuit (2018–2019)
- (Belgium) Circuit de Spa-Francorchamps (2018–2019, 2021, 2023–present)
- (Spain) Circuit de Barcelona-Catalunya (2018–2019, 2021–2024)
- (France) Circuit Paul Armagnac (2019–present)
- (Germany) Hockenheimring (2019)
- (France) Circuit de Nevers Magny-Cours (2020–2023, 2025)
- (Portugal) Algarve International Circuit (2020–2021, 2024)
- (Netherlands) Circuit Zandvoort (2022, 2025)
- (Italy) Monza Circuit (2022, 2024)
- (Italy) Mugello Circuit (2025)
