= Gosia Rdest =

Polish racing driver

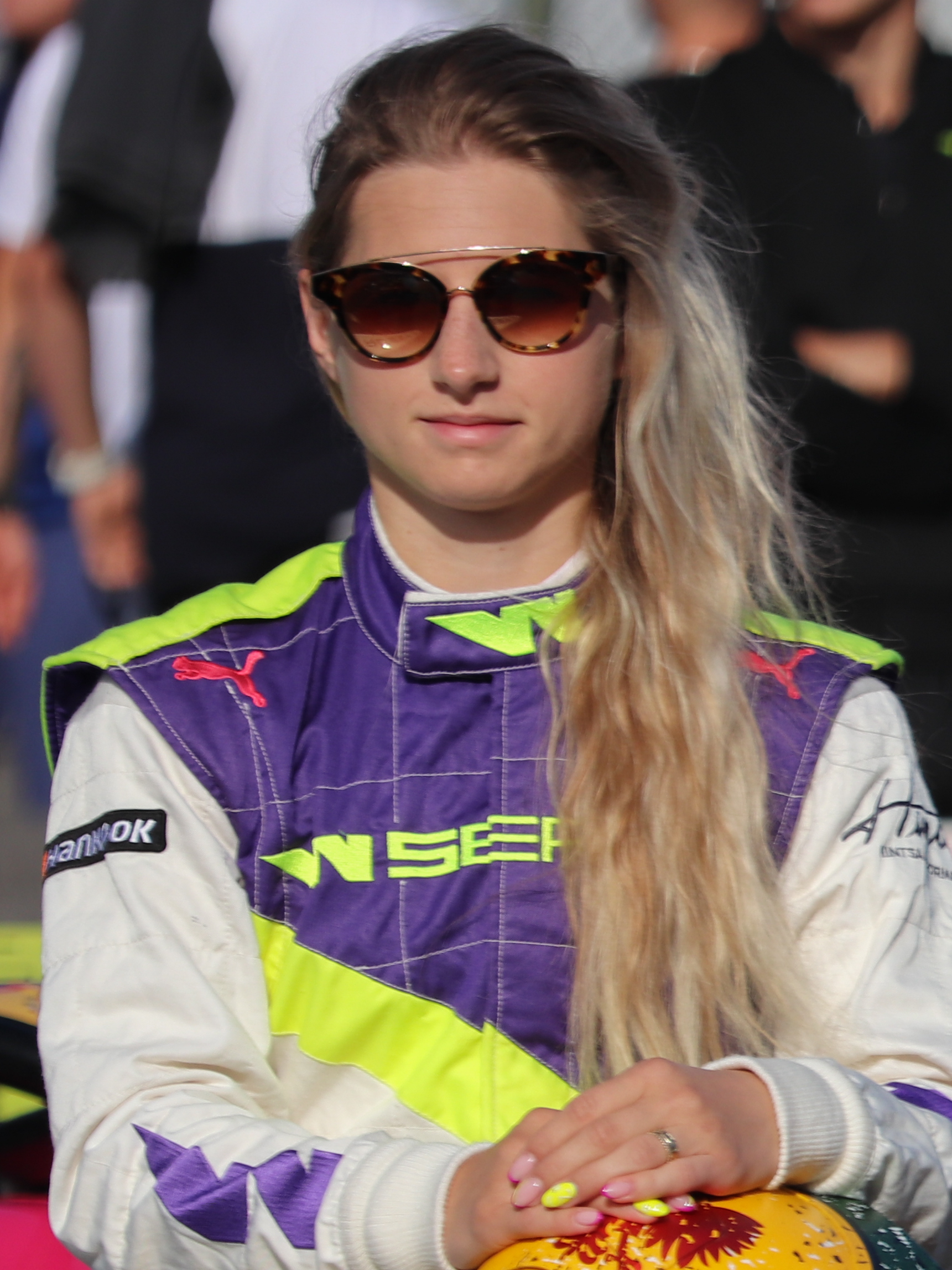
- Rdest in 2019
- Nationality: (Poland) Polish
- Born: Małgorzata Agnieszka Rdest; 14 January 1993 (age 33) Żyrardów, Masovia

Alpine Elf Europa Cup
- Categorisation: FIA Silver
- Years active: 2020–2024
- Starts: 32
- Wins: 0
- Poles: 0
- Fastest laps: 0
- Best finish: 8th in 2020, 2021

Previous series
- 2012 2013 2014 2015–2017 2018 2018 2019, 2021: Formula BMW Talent Cup; BRDC Formula 4 Championship; Central European Volkswagen Polo Cup; Audi Sport TT Cup; GT4 International Cup; GT4 Central European Cup; W Series

Championship titles
- 2011: Polish Karting Championship – Junior

Awards
- 2013: BRDC F4 "Who Zooms" Award

Małgorzata Agnieszka "Gosia" Rdest (born 14 January 1993 in Żyrardów) is a Polish racing driver and businesswoman. She currently competes in the Alpine Elf Europa Cup.

== Racing career ==
Rdest entered car racing in 2012 when she, as reigning Polish Junior Karting Champion, was scouted by BMW Motorsport. They would enter her in the final round of the Formula BMW Talent Cup for rookie drivers at Oschersleben, where she would finish all three races in the top-ten and finish tenth in the standings despite only entering the one event. She would move up to the BRDC Formula 4 Championship the following year, joining Douglas Motorsport alongside Sennan Fielding. Competing alongside more experienced drivers in open-wheelers, she would struggle to 18th in the standings having completed the full season and scoring a best finish of 11th at Snetterton – however, despite the lack of results, she would claim the "Who Zooms" award for the most overtakes over the course of the season.

She would move into one-make racing for 2014, entering the Central European Volkswagen Polo Cup. She would end the season 14th, with a best result of 6th in her home race at Tor Poznań before stepping up to the Audi Sport TT Cup for 2015. Rdest would compete in all three sanctioned seasons of the TT Cup, with a best result of second at both races in the 2017 season-opener at the Hockenheimring, and a best championship position of sixth in the same season. She would move across to GT4 competition in 2018, remaining with the Audi marque through German team Phoenix Racing and competing in both the International Cup with Max Hesse (finishing ninth) and the Central European Cup round at the Nürburgring alongside Óscar Tunjo, scoring a pole and race win.

Rdest would be selected to qualify for the W Series in 2019, and would be accepted as one of the 18 permanent drivers. She would score points in the first race at Hockenheim, however would be taken out by Esmee Hawkey in Zolder and struggled to thirteenth in Misano. She would qualify fourth at the Norisring, but sustained front wing damage in a first-corner skirmish with Fabienne Wohlwend and finished 14th and a lap down. A season-best sixth-place finish would follow at TT Circuit Assen, before 13th in the final round at Brands Hatch saw the Pole fail to automatically qualify for the 2020 W Series – ending the championship in 14th.

Rdest would return to GT racing in 2020, contesting the French-based Alpine Europa Cup. This followed a class win at the washed-out Dubai 24 Hour in January. She would be announced as a reserve driver for 2021 W Series season and would fulfill her role replacing Tasmin Pepper at the Red Bull Ring. She would place ninth in the first round, and 17th in the second after colliding with her team-mate Marta García. Rdest made her last W Series start at Spa-Francorchamps, deputising for unwell Irina Sidorkova – having narrowly avoided a pile-up in qualifying, she finished last in a wet race some 15 seconds behind second-last.

Rdest remained in the Alpine Europa Cup in 2021 and 2022, finishing eighth in the standings in the former with a podium at Magny-Cours. In 2024, following an 18-month break on maternity leave, she returned to motorsport through the same series.

== Personal life ==
In November 2021, Rdest became vice-president of Emka S.A., a Polish medical waste management company owned by her father.

Rdest married Karoł Łazarczyk in June 2022. The couple have two daughters, Klara and Kora, born in August 2023 and August 2025 respectively.

== Racing record ==
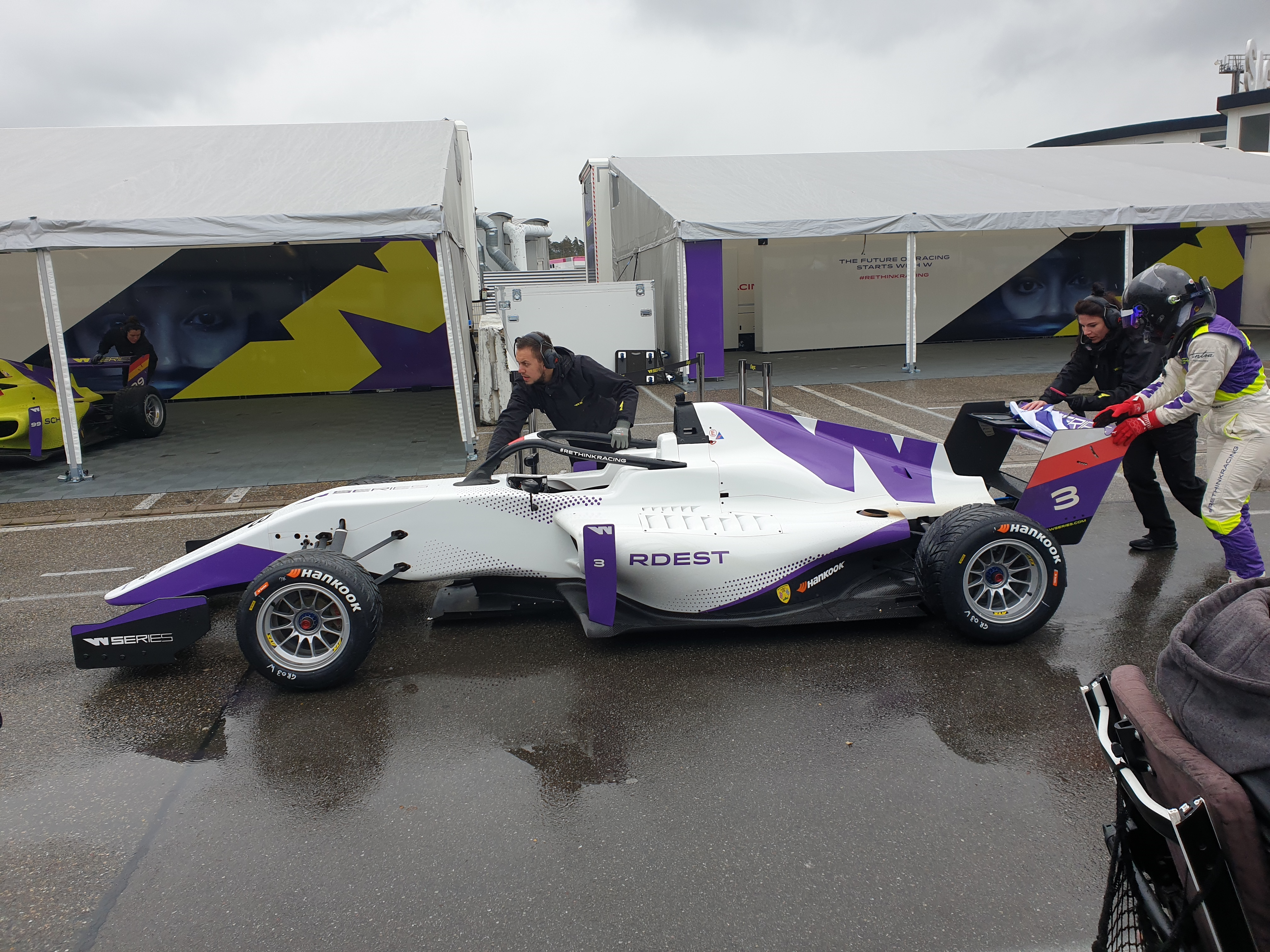
Rdest in the paddock at the 2019 W Series Hockenheim round

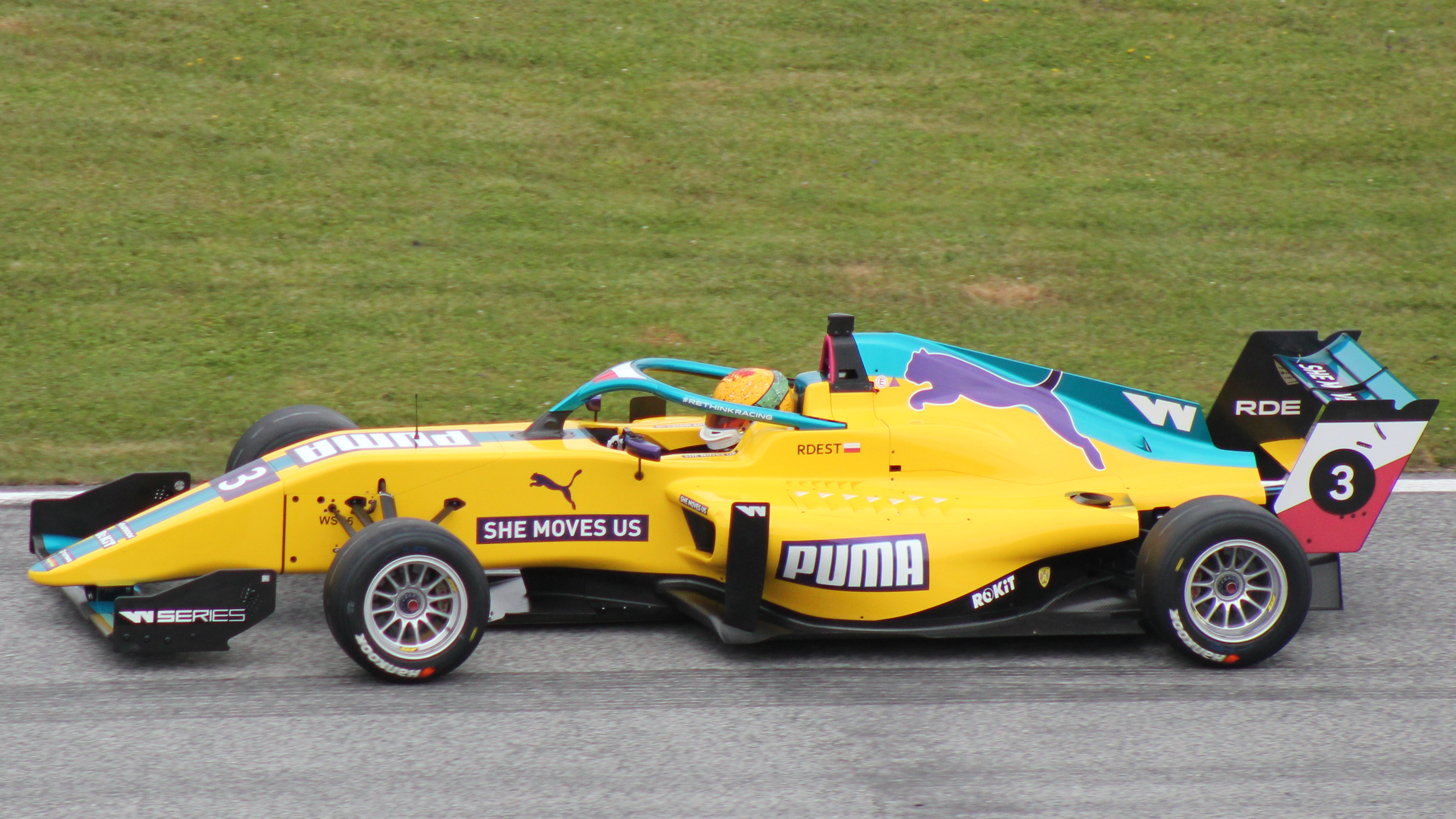
Rdest at the 2nd round of the 2021 W Series

=== Career summary ===
Season	Series	Team	Races	Wins	Poles	F/Laps	Podiums	Points	Position
2012	Formula BMW Talent Cup	BMW Motorsport	3	0	0	0	0	13	10th
2013	BRDC Formula 4 Championship	Douglas Motorsport	24	0	0	0	0	121	18th
2014	Central European Volkswagen Golf Cup	N/A	13	0	0	0	0	178	14th
2015	Audi Sport TT Cup	N/A	12	0	0	0	0	90.5	12th
2015	24H Series - A3T	R8 Motorsport							
2015	24H Series - D1	KPM Racing	1	0	0	0	0	6	10th
2016	Audi Sport TT Cup	N/A	14	0	0	0	0	149	8th
2016	ADAC TCR Germany Touring Car Championship	Engstler Motorsport	2	0	0	0	0	8	29th
2016	Campeonato Nacional de Velocidade Turismos	Target Competition	?	?	?	?	?	?	?
2017	Audi Sport TT Cup	N/A	13	0	0	0	2	149	6th
2017	ADAC TCR Germany Touring Car Championship	Target Competition	8	0	0	0	0	26	13th
2017	24H Series - TCR	Zest Racecar Engineering							
2018	GT4 International Cup	Phoenix Racing	3	0	0	0	0	N/A	9th
2018	GT4 Central European Cup	Phoenix Racing	2	1	1	0	2	43	12th
2018	24H GT Series - GT4	Phoenix Racing							
2018	Continental Tire SportsCar Challenge	Audi Sport Team USA	1	0	0	0	0	13	62nd
2018	International GT Open	Olimp Racing	2	0	0	0	0	0	45th
2019	W Series	Hitech Grand Prix	6	0	0	0	0	10	14th
2019	ADAC GT Masters	Aust Motorsport	2	0	0	0	0	0	40th
2019	Baltic Touring Car Championship - BTC2	Malgorzata Rdest	2	2	?	?	2	50	6th
2019	24H Series - 991	MRS GT-Racing							
2020	24H GT Series - 991	MRS GT-Racing	1	1	0	0	1	29	4th
2020	Alpine Europa Cup	Racing Technology	10	0	0	0	0	43	8th
2021	W Series	Puma W Series Team	2	0	0	0	0	2	18th
2021	W Series	W Series Academy	1	0	0	0	0	2	18th
2021	Alpine Europa Cup	Chazel Technologie Course	12	0	0	0	0	63	8th
2022	Alpine Europa Cup	Chazel Technologie Course	10	0	0	0	0	31	11th
2024	Alpine Europa Cup	Chazel Technologie Course							
2026	French GT4 Cup - Alpine Elf Cup Series	Chazel Technologie Course							

* Season still in progress.

=== Dubai 24 Hour results ===
Year	Team	Co-Drivers	Car	Class	Laps	Overall Position	Class Position
2015	(United Kingdom) KPM Racing	(Spain) Javier Morcillo (United Kingdom) Lucas Orrock (United Kingdom) Tom Wilson	Volkswagen Polo	A2	482	51st	9th
2017	(United Kingdom) Zest Racecar Engineering	(France) Philippe Ulivieri (United States) John Allen (United States) J.T. Coupal (United States) John Weisberg	SEAT León TCR	TCR	483	52nd	**3rd**
2018	(Germany) Phoenix Racing	(Finland) Joonas Lappalainen (Germany) John-Louis Jasper (United Kingdom) Philip Ellis	Audi R8 LMS GT	GT4	551	26th	**1st**
2019	(Germany) MRS GT-racing	(Japan) Yutaka Matsushima (Austria) Helmut Rödig (Germany) Wolfgang Triller (Austria) Christopher Zöchling	Porsche 991 Cup	991	564	18th	**2nd**
2020	(Germany) MRS GT-racing	(United Kingdom) Ollie Hancock (United Kingdom) John Hartshorne (Finland) Jukka Honkavuori	Porsche 991 Cup	991	160^{1}	18th	**1st**

^1 – Race abandoned after 7 hours due to circuit flooding.

=== Complete W Series results ===
(key) (Races in bold indicate pole position) (Races in italics indicate fastest lap)

Year	Team	1	2	3	4	5	6	7	8	DC	Points
2019	Hitech GP	HOC; 9	ZOL; Ret	MIS; 13	NOR; 14	ASS; 6	BRH; 13			14th	10
2021	Puma W Series Team	RBR1; 9	RBR2; 17	SIL	HUN					18th	2
2021	W Series Academy					SPA; 16	ZAN	COA1	COA2	18th	2

* Season still in progress.
