= 2020 Alpine Elf Europa Cup =

Car race in Europe

The 2020 Alpine Elf Europa Cup was the third season of the Alpine Elf Europa Cup, the one-make sports car racing series organized by Alpine for Alpine A110 Cup cars. It began on 22 August at Nogaro and concluded on 1 November at Portimão, after 1 triple-header and 3 double-header meetings.

== Entry list ==
Team	No.	Drivers	Class	Rounds
(France) Racing Technology	3	(Poland) Gosia Rdest		All
(France) Racing Technology	9	(Belgium) Phillippe Bourgois	G	All
(France) Racing Technology	11	(France) Pierre Sancinéna		1
(France) Racing Technology	76	(France) Pierre Sancinéna		2–4
(France) Racing Technology	110 (Note: Guest drivers in the #110 Racing Technology entry are ineligible for points and invisible as far as awarding points to other drivers.)	(France) Thomas Laurent	G	1
(France) Racing Technology	110	(Brazil) André Negrao	G	1
(France) Racing Technology	110	(Monaco) Arthur Leclerc	G	2
(France) Racing Technology	110	(France) Julien Febreau	G G	3
(France) Racing Technology	110	(France) Philippe Quetaud	G G	3–4
(France) Herrero Racing by Milan Competition	5	(France) Stéphane Proux	G	All
(France) Herrero Racing by Milan Competition	6	(France) Stéphane Auriacombe	G	2–3
(France) Herrero Racing by Milan Competition	7	(France) Franc Rouxel	G	All
(France) Herrero Racing by Milan Competition	21	(France) Marc Guillot		All
(France) Herrero Racing by Milan Competition	26	(France) Frédéric Croullet (Note: Drivers who started their first race of the season at the final or penultimate rounds are ineligible for points and invisible as far as awarding points to other drivers".)	G	3
(France) Herrero Racing by Milan Competition	29	(France) Mateo Herrero	J	All
(France) Herrero Racing by Milan Competition	31	(France) Louis Méric	J	1–2
(France) Tierce Racing	6	(France) Stéphane Auriacombe	G	1
(France) Autosport GP	17	(France) Jean-Baptiste Mela	J	All
(France) Autosport GP	18	(France) Pierre Macchi	G	All
(France) Autosport GP	44	(France) Lilou Wadoux	J	All
(France) Autosport GP	69	(France) Laurent Hurgon		All
(France) Autosport GP	97	(France) Léo Boulay	J	3
(France) Autosport GP	98	(France) Edwin Traynard	J	All
(France) Mirage Racing	38	(France) Yves Lemaître	G	1–3
(France) Race Cars Consulting	41	(France) Anthony Fournier	G	All
(France) Race Cars Consulting	77	(France) Franck Labescat	G	4
Entry Lists:

Icon	Class
G	Gentlemen
J	Junior
G	Guest

== Race calendar and results ==
The 2020 calendar was released at the end of season awards ceremony for the 2019 season. The series will be traveling to Misano and Portimão for the first time with the latter also becoming the new season finale. The rounds at Hockenheimring and Silverstone have been dropped while Barcelona, and Le Castellet have new dates. On 10 March 2020, the French government banned gatherings of more than 1000 people in response to the coronavirus pandemic. As a result, the Nogaro round has been moved to July. On 27 April 2020, the final calendar was released consisting of four rounds, down from the planned six, and a dramatically changed schedule primarily focused around France with the exception of the final round at Portimão. With this new schedule, the series traveled to Circuit de Nevers Magny-Cours for the first time. The series also utilized a three race format for some rounds.

Round		Circuit	Date	Pole position	Race winner	Junior Winner	Gentlemen Winner	Supporting
1	R1	(France) Circuit Paul Armagnac, Nogaro	22 August	(France) No. 29 Herrero Racing by Milan Competition	(France) No. 29 Herrero Racing by Milan Competition	(France) No. 29 Herrero Racing by Milan Competition	(France) No. 9 Racing Technology	FFSA GT Championship; French F4 Championship; French Renault Clio Cup; Peugeot 308 Racing Cup
1	R1	(France) Circuit Paul Armagnac, Nogaro	22 August	(France) Mateo Herrero	(France) Mateo Herrero	(France) Mateo Herrero	(Belgium) Phillippe Bourgois	FFSA GT Championship; French F4 Championship; French Renault Clio Cup; Peugeot 308 Racing Cup
1	R2	(France) Circuit Paul Armagnac, Nogaro	23 August	(France) No. 29 Herrero Racing by Milan Competition	(France) No. 29 Herrero Racing by Milan Competition	(France) No. 29 Herrero Racing by Milan Competition	(France) No. 9 Racing Technology	FFSA GT Championship; French F4 Championship; French Renault Clio Cup; Peugeot 308 Racing Cup
1	R2	(France) Circuit Paul Armagnac, Nogaro	23 August	(France) Mateo Herrero	(France) Mateo Herrero	(France) Mateo Herrero	(Belgium) Phillippe Bourgois	FFSA GT Championship; French F4 Championship; French Renault Clio Cup; Peugeot 308 Racing Cup
1	R3	(France) Circuit Paul Armagnac, Nogaro	23 August	(France) No. 29 Herrero Racing by Milan Competition	(France) No. 98 Autosport GP	(France) No. 98 Autosport GP	(France) No. 6 Tierce Racing	FFSA GT Championship; French F4 Championship; French Renault Clio Cup; Peugeot 308 Racing Cup
1	R3	(France) Circuit Paul Armagnac, Nogaro	23 August	(France) Mateo Herrero	(France) Edwin Traynard	(France) Edwin Traynard	(France) Stéphane Auriacombe	FFSA GT Championship; French F4 Championship; French Renault Clio Cup; Peugeot 308 Racing Cup
2	R1	(France) Circuit de Nevers Magny-Cours	12 September	(France) No. 17 Autosport GP	(France) No. 17 Autosport GP	(France) No. 17 Autosport GP	(France) No. 9 Racing Technology	GT World Challenge Europe Sprint Cup; French F4 Championship; French Renault Clio Cup; Formula Renault Eurocup
2	R1	(France) Circuit de Nevers Magny-Cours	12 September	(France) Jean-Baptiste Mela	(France) Jean-Baptiste Mela	(France) Jean-Baptiste Mela	(Belgium) Phillippe Bourgois	GT World Challenge Europe Sprint Cup; French F4 Championship; French Renault Clio Cup; Formula Renault Eurocup
2	R2	(France) Circuit de Nevers Magny-Cours	13 September	(France) No. 17 Autosport GP	(France) No. 17 Autosport GP	(France) No. 17 Autosport GP	(France) No. 6 Herrero Racing by Milan Competition	GT World Challenge Europe Sprint Cup; French F4 Championship; French Renault Clio Cup; Formula Renault Eurocup
2	R2	(France) Circuit de Nevers Magny-Cours	13 September	(France) Jean-Baptiste Mela	(France) Jean-Baptiste Mela	(France) Jean-Baptiste Mela	(France) Stéphane Auriacombe	GT World Challenge Europe Sprint Cup; French F4 Championship; French Renault Clio Cup; Formula Renault Eurocup
3	R1	(France) Circuit Paul Ricard, Le Castellet	3 October	(France) No. 17 Autosport GP	(France) No. 17 Autosport GP	(France) No. 17 Autosport GP	(France) No. 9 Racing Technology	FFSA GT Championship; French F4 Championship; French Renault Clio Cup; Peugeot 308 Racing Cup
3	R1	(France) Circuit Paul Ricard, Le Castellet	3 October	(France) Jean-Baptiste Mela	(France) Jean-Baptiste Mela	(France) Jean-Baptiste Mela	(Belgium) Phillippe Bourgois	FFSA GT Championship; French F4 Championship; French Renault Clio Cup; Peugeot 308 Racing Cup
3	R2	(France) Circuit Paul Ricard, Le Castellet	4 October	(France) No. 69 Autosport GP	(France) No. 69 Autosport GP	(France) No. 17 Autosport GP	(France) No. 5 Herrero Racing by Milan Competition	FFSA GT Championship; French F4 Championship; French Renault Clio Cup; Peugeot 308 Racing Cup
3	R2	(France) Circuit Paul Ricard, Le Castellet	4 October	(France) Laurent Hurgon	(France) Laurent Hurgon	(France) Jean-Baptiste Mela	(France) Stéphane Proux	FFSA GT Championship; French F4 Championship; French Renault Clio Cup; Peugeot 308 Racing Cup
3	R3	(France) Circuit Paul Ricard, Le Castellet	4 October	(France) No. 69 Autosport GP	(France) No. 17 Autosport GP	(France) No. 17 Autosport GP	(France) No. 41 Race Cars Consulting	FFSA GT Championship; French F4 Championship; French Renault Clio Cup; Peugeot 308 Racing Cup
3	R3	(France) Circuit Paul Ricard, Le Castellet	4 October	(France) Laurent Hurgon	(France) Jean-Baptiste Mela	(France) Jean-Baptiste Mela	(France) Anthony Fournier	FFSA GT Championship; French F4 Championship; French Renault Clio Cup; Peugeot 308 Racing Cup
4	R1	(Portugal) Algarve International Circuit, Portimão	31 October	(France) No. 17 Autosport GP	(France) No. 17 Autosport GP	(France) No. 17 Autosport GP	(France) No. 77 Race Cars Consulting	European Le Mans Series; Michelin Le Mans Cup
4	R1	(Portugal) Algarve International Circuit, Portimão	31 October	(France) Jean-Baptiste Mela	(France) Jean-Baptiste Mela	(France) Jean-Baptiste Mela	(France) Franck Labescat	European Le Mans Series; Michelin Le Mans Cup
4	R2	(Portugal) Algarve International Circuit, Portimão	1 November	(France) No. 76 Herrero Racing by Milan Competition	(France) No. 76 Herrero Racing by Milan Competition	(France) No. 17 Autosport GP	(France) No. 77 Race Cars Consulting	European Le Mans Series; Michelin Le Mans Cup
4	R2	(Portugal) Algarve International Circuit, Portimão	1 November	(France) Pierre Sancinéna	(France) Pierre Sancinéna	(France) Jean-Baptiste Mela	(France) Franck Labescat	European Le Mans Series; Michelin Le Mans Cup

== Championship Standings ==
=== Drivers' Championship ===
Scoring system

Points are awarded to the top 20 drivers. If less than 75% of the race distance is completed then half points are awarded. If less than two laps are completed then no points are given.

Position	1st	2nd	3rd	4th	5th	6th	7th	8th	9th	10th	11th-20th	PP	FL
Points	20	15	12	10	8	6	5	4	3	2	1	1	1

Pos.	Driver	NOG (France)			MAG (France)		LEC (France)			PRT† (Portugal)		Pts.
1	(France) Jean-Baptiste Mela	3	2	2	1	1	1	2	1	1	4	166
2	(France) Laurent Hurgon	4	3	6	2	2	2	1	2	3	3	129
3	(France) Pierre Sancinéna	2	4	5	3	3	5	4	3	5	1	113
4	(France) Mateo Herrero	1	1	3	5	Ret	3	3	13	13	DNS	89.5
5	(France) Marc Guillot	5	5	4	6	6	4	9	5	8	2	76.5
6	(France) Edwin Traynard	6	11	1	Ret	5	11	7	4	2	5	68.5
7	(France) Lilou Wadoux	7	6	8	4	4	7	5	7	4	7	65
8	(Poland) Gosia Rdest	8	7	10	8	Ret	6	6	6	6	6	43
9	(Belgium) Phillippe Bourgois	10	9	13	9	13	9	14	10	10	9	24
11	(France) Anthony Fournier	11	10	12	12	Ret	10	15	8	12	11	18
10	(France) Louis Méric	12	Ret	9	7	7						15
12	(France) Stéphane Proux	15	14	17	10	10	15	10	Ret	11	12	13.5
13	(France) Stéphane Auriacombe	DNS	Ret	11	11	8	12	Ret	9			11
14	(France) Yves Lemaître	14	13	15	13	9	13	11	11			10
15	(France) Léo Boulay						8	8	14			9
16	(France) Pierre Macchi	Ret	15	14	15	12	16	12	Ret	14	13	7.5
17	(France) Franc Rouxel	13	12	16	14	11	DNS	WD	WD	15	14	6.5
Drivers ineligible to score points
	(France) Franck Labescat									7	8	
	(Brazil) André Negrao	9		7								
	(France) Thomas Laurent		8									
	(France) Philippe Quetaud							Ret		9	10	
	(France) Frédéric Croullet						14	13	12			
	(Monaco) Arthur Leclerc				Ret	DNS						
	(France) Julien Febreau						Ret					
Pos.	Driver	NOG (France)			MAG (France)		LEC (France)			PRT (Portugal)		Pts.

†Half points were awarded for the first race at Portimão because the race had to be red-flagged due to an accident and so completed less than 75% of the scheduled distance.
