= 2019 Alpine Elf Europa Cup =

Car race in Europe

The 2019 Alpine Elf Europa Cup was the second season of the Alpine Elf Europa Cup, the one-make sports car racing series organized by Alpine for Alpine A110 Cup cars. It began on 20 April at Nogaro and finished on 13 October, at Le Castellet after six double-header meetings.

== Entry list ==
Team	No.	Drivers	Class	Rounds
(France) CMR	2	(Switzerland) Yann Zimmer		All
(France) CMR	15	(France) Gaël Castelli		All
(France) CMR	30	(Poland) Gosia Rdest (Note: Drivers who started their first race of the season at the penultimate or final rounds are ineligible for points and invisible as far as awarding points to other drivers.)		6
(France) CMR	64	(France) Mike Parisy		All
(France) Milan Competition	3	(France) Denis Gibaud	G	1, 6
(France) Milan Competition	6	(France) Antoine Miquel	J	1–3
(France) Milan Competition	6	(France) Stéphane Auriacombe	G	4
(France) Milan Competition	8	(France) Nicolas Milan		1–5
(France) Milan Competition	9	(Belgium) Phillippe Bourgois	G	1, 3–6
(France) Milan Competition	21	(France) Marc Guillot		All
(France) Milan Competition	29	(France) Mateo Herrero	J	All
(France) Milan Competition	77	(France) Rodolphe Wallgren	G	1, 5–6
(France) Racing Technology	4	(France) Mathieu Blaise	G	All
(France) Racing Technology	5	(France) Stéphane Proux	G	All
(France) Racing Technology	7	(France) Franc Rouxel	G	All
(France) Racing Technology	11	(France) Vincent Beltoise		All
(France) Racing Technology	110	(France) Julien Febreau (Note: Guest drivers in the #110 Racing Technology entry are ineligible for points and invisible as far as awarding points to other drivers.)	G G	1
(France) Racing Technology	110	(United Kingdom) Abbie Eaton	G	2
(France) Racing Technology	110	(France) Amaud Tsamere	G G	3
(France) Racing Technology	110	(United Kingdom) Matt Prior	G G	4
(France) Racing Technology	110	(Spain) Jaime Hernandez	G G	5
(France) Racing Technology	110	(France) Loic Depailler	G G	6
(France) Autosport GP	14	(France) Marc Sevestre	G	1–4, 6
(France) Autosport GP	17	(France) Jean-Baptiste Mela	J	All
(France) Autosport GP	18	(France) Pierre Macchi	G	2–3, 5–6
(France) Autosport GP	33	(France) Alexandre Gadois	J	3, 6
(France) Autosport GP	38	(France) Luc Ceret	G	1, 3
(France) Autosport GP	38	(France) Yves Lemaître	G	1, 5–6
(France) Autosport GP	74	(France) Julien Neveu		1–4
(France) Mirage Racing	34	(France) Axel Van Straaten	G	6
(France) Mirage Racing	73	(France) Didier Van Straaten	G	6
(France) Mirage Racing	73	(France) Patrick Lauber	G	6
(France) Autosport GP-Patrick Roger	69	(France) Laurent Hurgon		All

Icon	Class
G	Gentlemen
J	Junior
G	Guest

== Race calendar and results ==
- The 2019 calendar was released at the end of season awards ceremony for the 2018 season. A new round at Nogaro was announced to kick off the season with the previous opening round at Le Castellet moved to being the season finale. The Nürburgring round was also dropped in favor of racing at the Hockenheimring and the round at Dijon-Prenois has been left off the calendar. All weekends still support either the International GT Open or the FFSA GT Championship.

Round		Circuit	Date	Pole position	Race winner	Junior Winner	Gentlemen Winner
1	R1	(France) Circuit Paul Armagnac, Nogaro	22 April	(France) No. 29 Milan Competition	(France) No. 29 Milan Competition	(France) No. 29 Milan Competition	(France) No. 110 Racing Technology
1	R1	(France) Circuit Paul Armagnac, Nogaro	22 April	(France) Mateo Herrero	(France) Mateo Herrero	(France) Mateo Herrero	(France) Julien Febreau
1	R2	(France) Circuit Paul Armagnac, Nogaro	23 April	(France) No. 64 CMR	(France) No. 64 CMR	(France) No. 29 Milan Competition	(France) No. 77 Milan Competition
1	R2	(France) Circuit Paul Armagnac, Nogaro	23 April	(France) Mike Parisy	(France) Mike Parisy	(France) Mateo Herrero	(France) Rodolphe Wallgren
2	R1	(Germany) Hockenheimring	25 May	(France) No. 17 Autosport GP	(France) No. 17 Autosport GP	(France) No. 17 Autosport GP	(France) No. 4 Racing Technology
2	R1	(Germany) Hockenheimring	25 May	(France) Jean-Baptiste Mela	(France) Jean-Baptiste Mela	(France) Jean-Baptiste Mela	(France) Mathieu Blaise
2	R2	(Germany) Hockenheimring	26 May	(France) No. 17 Autosport GP	(France) No. 29 Milan Competition	(France) No. 29 Milan Competition	(France) No. 4 Racing Technology
2	R2	(Germany) Hockenheimring	26 May	(France) Jean-Baptiste Mela	(France) Mateo Herrero	(France) Mateo Herrero	(France) Mathieu Blaise
3	R1	(Belgium) Circuit de Spa-Francorchamps	8 June	(France) No. 15 CMR	(France) No. 15 CMR	(France) No. 17 Autosport GP	(France) No. 4 Racing Technology
3	R1	(Belgium) Circuit de Spa-Francorchamps	8 June	(France) Gaël Castelli	(France) Gaël Castelli	(France) Jean-Baptiste Mela	(France) Mathieu Blaise
3	R2	(Belgium) Circuit de Spa-Francorchamps	9 June	(France) No. 15 CMR	(France) No. 21 Milan Competition	(France) No. 17 Autosport GP	(France) No. 9 Milan Competition
3	R2	(Belgium) Circuit de Spa-Francorchamps	9 June	(France) Gaël Castelli	(France) Marc Guillot	(France) Jean-Baptiste Mela	(Belgium) Phillippe Bourgois
4	R1	(United Kingdom) Silverstone Circuit	7 September	(France) No. 15 CMR	(France) No. 15 CMR	(France) No. 17 Autosport GP	(France) No. 4 Racing Technology
4	R1	(United Kingdom) Silverstone Circuit	7 September	(France) Gaël Castelli	(France) Gaël Castelli	(France) Jean-Baptiste Mela	(France) Mathieu Blaise
4	R2	(United Kingdom) Silverstone Circuit	8 September	(France) No. 74 Autosport GP	(France) No. 15 CMR	(France) No. 17 Autosport GP	(France) No. 6 Milan Competition
4	R2	(United Kingdom) Silverstone Circuit	8 September	(France) Julien Neveu	(France) Gaël Castelli	(France) Jean-Baptiste Mela	(France) Stéphane Auriacombe
5	R1	(Spain) Circuit de Barcelona-Catalunya	21 September	(France) No. 69 Autosport GP-Patrick Roger	(France) No. 15 CMR	(France) No. 29 Milan Competition	(France) No. 77 Milan Competition
5	R1	(Spain) Circuit de Barcelona-Catalunya	21 September	(France) Laurent Hurgon	(France) Gaël Castelli	(France) Mateo Herrero	(France) Rodolphe Wallgren
5	R2	(Spain) Circuit de Barcelona-Catalunya	22 September	(France) No. 29 Milan Competition	(France) No. 29 Milan Competition	(France) No. 29 Milan Competition	(France) No. 77 Milan Competition
5	R2	(Spain) Circuit de Barcelona-Catalunya	22 September	(France) Mateo Herrero	(France) Mateo Herrero	(France) Mateo Herrero	(France) Rodolphe Wallgren
6	R1	(France) Circuit Paul Ricard, Le Castellet	11 October	(France) No. 21 Milan Competition	(France) No. 11 Racing Technology	(France) No. 29 Milan Competition	(France) No. 77 Milan Competition
6	R1	(France) Circuit Paul Ricard, Le Castellet	11 October	(France) Marc Guillot	(France) Vincent Beltoise	(France) Mateo Herrero	(France) Rodolphe Wallgren
6	R2	(France) Circuit Paul Ricard, Le Castellet	13 October	(France) No. 21 Milan Competition	(France) No. 15 CMR	(France) No. 17 Autosport GP	(France) No. 9 Milan Competition
6	R2	(France) Circuit Paul Ricard, Le Castellet	13 October	(France) Marc Guillot	(France) Gaël Castelli	(France) Jean-Baptiste Mela	(Belgium) Phillippe Bourgois

== Championship Standings ==
=== Drivers' Championship ===
Scoring system

Points are awarded to the top 20 drivers. If less than 75% of the race distance is completed then half points are awarded. If less than two laps are completed then no points are given.

Position	1st	2nd	3rd	4th	5th	6th	7th	8th	9th	10th	11th-20th	PP	FL
Points	20	15	12	10	8	6	5	4	3	2	1	1	1

Pos.	Driver	NOG (France)		HOC (Germany)		SPA (Belgium)		SIL (United Kingdom)		CAT (Spain)		LEC (France)		Pts.
1	(France) Gaël Castelli	2	5	2	12	1	2	1	1	1	2	2	1	192
2	(France) Marc Guillot	4	4	3	2	2	1	6	6	Ret	5	Ret	2	121
3	(France) Mateo Herrero	1	6	Ret	1	6	5	7	Ret	2	1	3	Ret	115
4	(France) Jean-Baptiste Mela	Ret	9	1	8	3	4	2	5	3	9	4	4	114
5	(France) Vincent Beltoise	9	2	Ret	4	11	7	5	7	4	3	1	3	104
6	(France) Laurent Hurgon	3	Ret	8	3	5	9	3	3	Ret	4	7	Ret	68
7	(Switzerland) Yann Zimmer	6	3	4	Ret	Ret	18	4	4			5	10	60
8	(France) Mike Parisy	8	1	6	Ret	4	3	Ret	11					54
9	(France) Mathieu Blaise	11	13	11	6	12	12	8	10	7	8	8	8	41
10	(France) Nicolas Milan	5	Ret	5	Ret	10	8	DNS	8	5	6			40
11	(France) Julien Neveu	Ret	7	10	DNS	7	10	13	2					32
12	(France) Marc Sevestre	12	14	12	7	14	13	9	12			20	9	22
13	(France) Alexandre Gadois					8	6					10	5	21
14	(France) Rodolphe Wallgren	Ret	10							6	7	6	11	21
15	(France) Antoine Miquel	7	8	7	Ret	9	17							18
16	(Belgium) Phillippe Bourgois	Ret	12			15	11	11	Ret	8	10	13	7	17
17	(France) Franc Rouxel	14	16	Ret	9	16	15	14	DNS	Ret	14	16	17	13
18	(France) Stéphane Proux	Ret	Ret	14	11	19	DNS	15	14	11	13	17	15	12
19	(France) Pierre Macchi			13	10	18	14			12	Ret	15	12	10
20	(France) Yves Lemaître		17							10	11	14	13	8
21	(France) Stéphane Auriacombe							10	9					5
22	(France) Denis Gibaud	13	15									12	14	5
23	(France) Luc Ceret	15				17	16							2
Drivers ineligible to score points
	(France) Julien Febreau	10	11											
	(United Kingdom) Abbie Eaton			9	5									
	(France) Amaud Tsamere					13	Ret							
	(United Kingdom) Matt Prior							12	13					
	(Spain) Jaime Hernandez									9	12			
	(Poland) Gosia Rdest											9	6	
	(France) Loic Depailler											11	Ret	
	(France) Didier Van Straaten											18		
	(France) Axel Van Straaten											19	Ret	
	(France) Patrick Lauber												16	
Pos.	Driver	NOG (France)		HOC (Germany)		SPA (Belgium)		SIL (United Kingdom)		CAT (Spain)		LEC (France)		Pts.
