= Ugo de Wilde =

Belgian racing driver (born 2002)

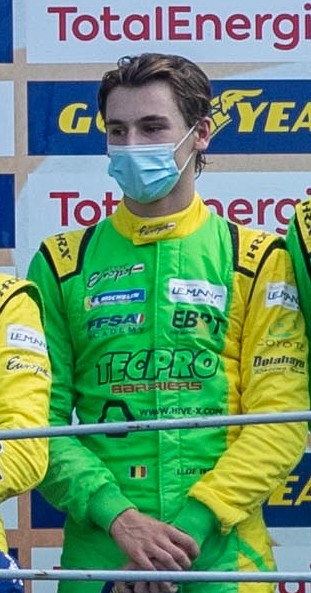
- De Wilde in 2021
- Nationality: Belgium
- Born: 20 November 2002 (age 23) Brussels, Belgium

GT World Challenge Europe Endurance Cup career
- Debut season: 2024
- Current team: Rowe Racing
- Categorisation: FIA Silver (until 2021); FIA Gold (2022–)
- Car number: 998
- Starts: 39
- Wins: 1
- Podiums: 4
- Poles: 0
- Fastest laps: 0
- Best finish: 3rd in 2025

Previous series
- 2017-2018; 2017-18: French F4 Championship; Formula 4 South East Asia Championship

Ugo de Wilde (born 20 November 2002) is a Belgian racing driver. He is competing in the GT World Challenge Europe Endurance Cup as part of Rowe Racing as a factory driver for BMW.

== Career ==
=== Karting ===
Born and raised in Brussels, de Wilde started his karting career in 2011. He competed mainly in European Karting Series, such as the domestic Belgian Kart Cup, where he finished second at the age of nine, and in the CIK-FIA European Championship in his last year of karting in 2016, where he competed against drivers such as Red Bull Academy member Dennis Hauger and Frenchman Théo Pourchaire, trumping the latter in the standings.

=== Lower formulae ===
In 2017, de Wilde made his single-seater racing debut in the French F4 Championship at the age of 14, a record at the time. He didn't score any points until the midpoint of the season, though he drastically improved in its second half, scoring three podiums, helping the Belgian to 12th in the standings.

In the winter of 2017–2018, de Wilde competed in two rounds of the Formula 4 SEA Championship, where he won five races, which helped him to finish third in the drivers' championship.

The next year, de Wilde continued racing in the now FIA-backed series. He won four races and became vice-champion, 66.5 points behind Caio Collet.

=== Formula Renault Eurocup ===
In 2019, de Wilde made his debut in the Formula Renault Eurocup for JD Motorsport. He won the first race of the championship at Monza, however he was unable to score more podium finishes this year. De Wilde finished the season in seventh place.

In 2020, de Wilde would move to Arden Motorsport for another season in the series. Despite three podium finishes, de Wilde only managed to finish ninth in the standings.

=== European Le Mans Series ===
De Wilde switched over to the European Le Mans Series for the 2021 season with Inter Europol Competition in the LMP3 category.

== Karting record ==
=== Karting career summary ===
Season	Series	Team	Position
2011	Chrono Dutch RMC - Micro Max		15th
2011–12	Chrono Rotax Max Winter Cup Micromax		11th
2012	Belgian Kart Cup - Mini Parilla		2nd
2012	BNL Karting Series - Rotax Micro		5th
2013	BNL Karting Series - Minimax		10th
2014	BNL Karting Series - Minimax		4th
2015	FIA Karting European Championship - KF Junior		35th
2015	X30 Challenge Europa - X30 Junior		31st
2015	FIA Karting Academy Trophy		13th
2015	IAME International Final - X30 Junior		19th
2016	WSK Champions Cup - OK Junior	Ecurie Hesbaye Raph	
2016	WSK Super Master Series - OK Junior		26th
2016	FIA Karting European Championship - OK Junior		15th
2016	FIA Karting World Championship - OK Junior	Ecurie Hesbaye	22nd
2016	IAME International Final - X30 Junior		5th

== Racing record ==
=== Racing career summary ===
Season	Series	Team	Races	Wins	Poles	F/Laps	Podiums	Points	Position
2017	French F4 Championship	FFSA Academy	24	0	0	1	3	68	12th
2017–18	F4 SEA Championship	Meritus.GP	12	5	2	3	8	212	**3rd**
2018	French F4 Championship	FFSA Academy	21	4	4	1	8	237	**2nd**
2019	Formula Renault Eurocup	JD Motorsport	20	1	0	0	1	81	7th
2020	Formula Renault Eurocup	Arden Motorsport	20	0	0	0	3	85.5	9th
2021	Alpine Elf Europa Cup	Herrero Racing	12	4	6	4	9	169	**2nd**
2021	European Le Mans Series - LMP3	Inter Europol Competition	6	1	0	0	3	67	4th
2021	Michelin Le Mans Cup - LMP3	Mühlner Motorsport	4	1	1	0	1	21	16th
2021	IMSA Prototype Challenge - LMP3-1	Mühlner Motorsport America	2	1	2	0	1	560	19th
2022	European Le Mans Series - LMP2	Mühlner Motorsport	6	0	0	0	1	19	15th
2022	IMSA SportsCar Championship - LMP3	Mühlner Motorsport America	3	0	0	0	0	481	27th
2023	Lamborghini Super Trofeo Europe - Pro	Iron Lynx	12	1	0	2	4	47	5th
2023	24 Hours of Le Mans - LMP2	DKR Engineering	1	0	0	0	0	N/A	15th
2024	GT World Challenge Europe Sprint Cup	Imperiale Racing	8	0	0	0	0	0	NC
2024	Italian GT Endurance Championship - GT3	Imperiale Racing	2	0	0	0	0	11	NC
2024	GT World Challenge Europe Endurance Cup	Saintéloc Racing	3	0	0	0	0	0	NC
2025	GT World Challenge Europe Endurance Cup	Team WRT	5	1	1	1	1	63	**3rd**
2025	China GT Championship - GT3	FIST Team AAI	6	0	0	0	0	38	10th
2025	Nürburgring Langstrecken-Serie - BMW M240i	Adrenalin Motorsport Team Mainhattan Wheels	1	0	0	0	1	0	NC
2025	Nürburgring Langstrecken-Serie - SP3T	FK Performance Motorsport	2	0	0	0	2	0	NC
2025	24 Hours of Nürburgring - SP3T	FK Performance Motorsport	1	1	0	0	1	N/A	**1st**
2026	Nürburgring Langstrecken-Serie - SP9	Schubert Motorsport	1	0	0	0	0	*	*
2026	Nürburgring Langstrecken-Serie - SP-X	Schubert Motorsport	1	1	0	1	1	*	*
2026	24 Hours of Nürburgring - SP-X	Schubert Motorsport	1	1	1	1	1	N/A	**1st**
2026	GT World Challenge Europe Endurance Cup - Gold Cup	ROWE Racing	5	1	0	0	4	107	**1st**
2026	Italian GT Championship Sprint Cup - GT3	BMW Italia Ceccato Racing	4	1	0	1	1	29	NC†

* Season still in progress.

=== Complete French F4 Championship results ===
(key) (Races in bold indicate pole position) (Races in italics indicate fastest lap)

Year	1	2	3	4	5	6	7	8	9	10	11	12	13	14	15	16	17	18	19	20	21	Pos	Points
2017	NOG; 1; 13	NOG; 2; 14	NOG; 3; 15	MNZ; 1; 13	MNZ; 2; 13	MNZ; 3; 12	PAU; 1; 12	PAU; 2; 12	PAU; 3; 12	SPA; 1; 12	SPA; 2; 8	SPA; 3; 12	MAG; 1; 12	MAG; 2; 10	MAG; 3; 13	CAT; 1; 7	CAT; 2; 3	CAT; 3; 5	LEC; 1; 4	LEC; 2; 7	LEC; 3; 3	12th	68
2018	**NOG**; **1**; 1	NOG; 2; 5	NOG; 3; 2	PAU; 1; 3	PAU; 2; 4	PAU; 3; 2	SPA; 1; 7	SPA; 2 Ret	SPA; 3; 6	**DIJ**; **1**; 1	DIJ; 2; 8	DIJ; 3; 5	MAG; 1 Ret	MAG; 2; 4	MAG; 3; 4	JER; 1; 6	JER; 2; 3	JER; 3; 6	**LEC**; **1**; 1	LEC; 2; 5	**LEC**; **3**; 1	2nd	237

=== Complete Formula 4 South East Asia Championship results ===
(key) (Races in bold indicate pole position) (Races in italics indicate fastest lap)

Year	1	2	3	4	5	6	7	8	9	10	11	12	13	14	15	16	17	18	19	20	21	22	23	24	25	26	27	28	29	30	Pos	Points
2017-18	SEP1; 1	SEP1; 2	SEP1; 3	SEP1; 4	SEP1; 5	SEP1; 6	CLA; 1	CLA; 2	CLA; 3	CLA; 4	CLA; 5	CLA; 6	**CHA**; **1**; 3	CHA; 2; 1	CHA; 3; 1	**CHA**; **4**; 1	CHA; 5; 1	CHA; 6; 6	SEP2; 1; 3	SEP2; 2; 8	SEP2; 3 Ret	SEP2; 4; 2	SEP2; 5; 1	SEP2; 6; 5	SEP3; 1	SEP3; 2	SEP3; 3	SEP3; 4	SEP3; 5	SEP3; 6	3rd	212

=== Complete Formula Renault Eurocup results ===
(key) (Races in bold indicate pole position) (Races in italics indicate fastest lap)

Year	Team	1	2	3	4	5	6	7	8	9	10	11	12	13	14	15	16	17	18	19	20	Pos	Points
2019	JD Motorsport	MNZ; 1; 1	MNZ; 2 Ret	SIL; 1; 4	SIL; 2; 7	MON; 1; 9	MON; 2; 12	LEC; 1; 7	LEC; 2; 8	SPA; 1; 13	SPA; 2; 12	NÜR; 1; 10	NÜR; 2; 9	HUN; 1 DNS	HUN; 2; 11	CAT; 1; 9	CAT; 2; 6	HOC; 1; 4	HOC; 2; 11	YMC; 1; 13	YMC; 2; 11	7th	81
2020	Arden Motorsport	MNZ; 1; 8	MNZ; 2 Ret	IMO; 1; 8	IMO; 2; 8	NÜR; 1; 12	NÜR; 2; 12	MAG; 1; 7	MAG; 2; 7	ZAN; 1; 12	ZAN; 2; 13	CAT; 1; 3	CAT; 2 Ret	SPA; 1; 3‡	SPA; 2; 2	IMO; 1; 9	IMO; 2; 5	HOC; 1 Ret	HOC; 2; 8	LEC; 1; 8	LEC; 2; 11	9th	85.5

^{‡} Half points awarded as less than 75% of race distance was completed.

=== Complete Alpine Elf Europa Cup results ===
(key) (Races in bold indicate pole position) (Races in italics indicate fastest lap)

Year	Team	1	2	3	4	5	6	7	8	9	10	11	12	Pos	Points
2021	Herrero Racing	**NOG**; **1**; 2	**NOG**; **2**; 1	MAG; 1 DNS	MAG; 2 Ret	SPA; 1; 2	**SPA**; **2**; 4	CAT; 1; 3	CAT; 2; 3	**LEC**; **1**; 1	LEC; 2; 1	**POR**; **1**; 3	**POR**; **2**; 1	2nd	169

=== Complete European Le Mans Series results ===
(key) (Races in bold indicate pole position; results in italics indicate fastest lap)

Year	Entrant	Class	Chassis	Engine	1	2	3	4	5	6	Rank	Points
2021	Inter Europol Competition	LMP3	Ligier JS P320	Nissan VK56DE 5.6L V8	CAT; 3	RBR; 4	LEC; NC	MNZ; 3	SPA; NC	ALG; 1	4th	67
2022	Mühlner Motorsport	LMP2	Oreca 07	Gibson GK428 4.2 L V8	LEC; 9	IMO; 11	MNZ; 3	CAT; 9	SPA; Ret	ALG; Ret	15th	19

=== Complete WeatherTech SportsCar Championship results ===
(key) (Races in bold indicate pole position; results in italics indicate fastest lap)

Year	Team	Class	Make	Engine	1	2	3	4	5	6	7	Pos.	Points
2022	Mühlner Motorsports America	LMP3	Duqueine M30 - D08	Nissan VK56DE 5.6 L V8	DAY; 6	SEB; 9	MDO	WGL; 10	MOS	ELK	PET	27th	481

=== Complete 24 Hours of Le Mans results ===
Year	Team	Co-Drivers	Car	Class	Laps	Pos.	Class Pos.
2023	(Luxembourg) DKR Engineering	(Belgium) Maxime Martin (Belgium) Tom van Rompuy	Oreca 07-Gibson	LMP2	311	32nd	15th
2023	(Luxembourg) DKR Engineering	(Belgium) Maxime Martin (Belgium) Tom van Rompuy	Oreca 07-Gibson	LMP2 Pro-Am	311	32nd	**3rd**

=== Complete GT World Challenge Europe results ===
==== GT World Challenge Europe Endurance Cup ====
Year	Team	Car	Class	1	2	3	4	5	6	7	Pos.	Points
2024	Saintéloc Racing	Audi R8 LMS Evo II	Silver	LEC; 48†							33rd	1
2024	Saintéloc Racing	Audi R8 LMS Evo II	Gold		SPA; 6H; 37	SPA; 12H; 21	SPA; 24H; 15				9th	38
2024	Saintéloc Racing	Audi R8 LMS Evo II	Bronze					NÜR; 37	MNZ	JED	43rd	2
2025	Team WRT	BMW M4 GT3 Evo	Pro	LEC; 1	MNZ; 5	SPA; 6H; 7	SPA; 12H; 9	SPA; 24H; 7	**NÜR**; 10	CAT; 6	3rd	63
2026	Rowe Racing	BMW M4 GT3 Evo	Gold	LEC; 10	MNZ; 23	SPA; 6H; 8	SPA; 12H; 10	SPA; 24H; 11	NÜR; 17	ALG; 7	1st	107

^{*} Season still in progress.

==== GT World Challenge Europe Sprint Cup ====
Year	Team	Car	Class	1	2	3	4	5	6	7	8	Pos.	Points
2024	Imperiale Racing	Lamborghini Huracán GT3 Evo 2	Bronze	MIS; 1; 15	MIS; 2; 21	HOC; 1; 23	HOC; 2; 25	MAG; 1; 24	MAG; 2; 27	CAT; 1 Ret	CAT; 2; 27	6th	42.5

=== Complete 24 Hours of Spa results ===
Year	Team	Co-Drivers	Car	Class	Laps	Pos.	Class Pos.
2024	(France) Saintéloc Racing	(France) Paul Evrard (Belgium) Gilles Magnus (France) Jim Pla	Audi R8 LMS Evo II	Gold	476	15th	2nd
2025	(Belgium) Team WRT	(South Africa) Kelvin van der Linde (Belgium) Charles Weerts	BMW M4 GT3 Evo	Pro Cup	548	7th	7th
2026	(Germany) ROWE Racing	(Germany) Jens Klingmann (Germany) Tim Tramnitz	BMW M4 GT3 Evo	Gold Cup	540	11th	1st

=== Complete 24 Hours of Zolder results ===
Year	Team	Co-Drivers	Car	Class	Laps	Pos.	Class Pos.
2021	(Belgium) McDonald's Racing	(Belgium) François Bouillon (Belgium) Koen De Wit (France) Adam Eteki (Belgium) Karlo Van Dosselaer	Norma M20-FC	Belcar 1	819	2nd	2nd

=== Complete 24 Hours of Nürburgring results ===
Year	Team	Co-Drivers	Car	Class	Laps	Pos.	Class Pos.
2025	(Germany) FK Performance Motorsport	(Germany) Michael Bräutigam (Germany) Jens Klingmann (Belgium) Charles Weerts	BMW M2 Racing (G87)	SP 3T	120	35th	1st
2026	(Germany) Schubert Motorsport	(United States) Connor De Phillippi (Germany) Jens Klingmann (United States) Neil Verhagen	BMW M3 Touring 24H	SP-X	156	4th	1st
