= 2021 Alpine Elf Europa Cup =

Car race in Europe

The 2021 Alpine Elf Europa Cup was the fourth season of the Alpine Elf Europa Cup, the one-make sports car racing series organized by Alpine for Alpine A110 Cup cars. It began on 3 April at Nogaro and concluded on 24 October at Portimão.

== Calendar ==
The final calendar was announced on December 14, 2020, featuring six rounds.

Round		Circuit	Date	Supporting
1	R1	(France) Circuit Paul Armagnac	April 3–5	FFSA GT Championship
1	R2	(France) Circuit Paul Armagnac	April 3–5	FFSA GT Championship
2	R1	(France) Circuit de Nevers Magny-Cours	May 7–9	GT World Challenge Europe Sprint Cup
2	R2	(France) Circuit de Nevers Magny-Cours	May 7–9	GT World Challenge Europe Sprint Cup
3	R1	(Belgium) Circuit de Spa-Francorchamps	June 18–20	International GT Open
3	R2	(Belgium) Circuit de Spa-Francorchamps	June 18–20	International GT Open
4	R1	(Spain) Circuit de Barcelona-Catalunya	September 2–4	24 Hours of Barcelona
4	R2	(Spain) Circuit de Barcelona-Catalunya	September 2–4	24 Hours of Barcelona
5	R1	(France) Circuit Paul Ricard	October 1–3	FFSA GT Championship
5	R2	(France) Circuit Paul Ricard	October 1–3	FFSA GT Championship
6	R1	(Portugal) Algarve International Circuit	October 22–24	European Le Mans Series
6	R2	(Portugal) Algarve International Circuit	October 22–24	European Le Mans Series

== Entry list ==
Team	No.	Drivers	Class	Rounds
(France) Autosport GP (Note: Cars #1, #8, #33, and #72 entered as Autosport GP, cars #18 and #44 entered as Patrick Roger Autosport GP. Car #69 entered as LSGroup Autosport GP.) (France) Patrick Roger Autosport GP (France) LSGroup Autosport GP	1	(France) Jean-Baptiste Mela		All
(France) Autosport GP (France) Patrick Roger Autosport GP (France) LSGroup Autosport GP	8	(France) Simon Tirman	J	All
(France) Autosport GP (France) Patrick Roger Autosport GP (France) LSGroup Autosport GP	18	(France) Pierre Macchi	G	1–3, 5–6
(France) Autosport GP (France) Patrick Roger Autosport GP (France) LSGroup Autosport GP	33	(Monaco) Grégory Romano	G	All
(France) Autosport GP (France) Patrick Roger Autosport GP (France) LSGroup Autosport GP	44	(France) Lilou Wadoux	J	All
(France) Autosport GP (France) Patrick Roger Autosport GP (France) LSGroup Autosport GP	69	(France) Laurent Hurgon		All
(France) Autosport GP (France) Patrick Roger Autosport GP (France) LSGroup Autosport GP	72	(France) Thomas Dagoneau		1–2
(France) BL Sport	2	(France) Luc Rozentvaig	G	1–3
(France) Chazel Technologie Course	3	(Poland) Gosia Rdest		All
(France) Chazel Technologie Course	9	(Belgium) Philippe Bourgois	G	All
(France) Chazel Technologie Course	14	(France) Jean-Paul Dominici (Note: Drivers who started their first race of the season at the final round are ineligible for points and invisible as far as awarding points to other drivers.)	G	6
(France) Chazel Technologie Course	93	(France) Lucas Frayssinet	J	3–5
(France) Chazel Technologie Course	94	(France) Henry Hassid	G	5
(France) Chazel Technologie Course	94	(France) Maxime Hassid	G	5
(France) Chazel Technologie Course	110	(France) Manu Guigou	G	1
(France) Chazel Technologie Course	110	(France) Bruce Jouanny	G	2
(France) Chazel Technologie Course	110	(Spain) Dani Clos	G	3
(France) Chazel Technologie Course	110	(France) Tugdual Rabreau	G G	4
(France) Chazel Technologie Course	110	(Belgium) Stéphane De Groodt	G G	5
(France) Chazel Technologie Course	110	(France) Philippe Quetaud	G G	6
(France) Herrero Racing	4	(France) Mathieu Blaise	G	5
(France) Herrero Racing	5	(France) Stéphane Proux	G	1–3
(France) Herrero Racing	7	(France) Franc Rouxel	G	1–2, 4–6
(France) Herrero Racing	11	(France) Corentin Tierce	J	All
(France) Herrero Racing	23	(France) Laurent Richard	G	3–6
(France) Herrero Racing	27	(Belgium) Ugo de Wilde	J	All
(France) Herrero Racing	45	(France) Frédéric Roy	G	2
(France) Herrero Racing	63	(France) Stéphane Auriacombe	G	All
(France) Méric Competition	31	(France) Louis Méric	J	1–2
(France) Race Cars Consulting	31	(France) Louis Méric	J	3–6
(France) Race Cars Consulting	40	(France) Franck Labescat	G	1–2, 5
(France) Race Cars Consulting	41	(France) Henri Lombard	J	1–2
(France) Race Cars Consulting	41	(France) Anthony Fournier	G	5–6
Entry Lists:

Icon	Class
G	Gentlemen
J	Junior
G	Guest

== Race results ==
Bold indicates overall winner.

Round		Circuit	Pole position	Race winner	Junior Winner	Gentlemen Winner
1	R1	(France) Nogaro	(France) No. 27 Herrero Racing	(France) **No. 69 LSGroup Autosport GP**	(France) No. 27 Herrero Racing	(France) No. 40 Race Cars Consulting
1	R1	(France) Nogaro	(Belgium) Ugo de Wilde	(France) **Laurent Hurgon**	(Belgium) Ugo de Wilde	(France) Franck Labescat
1	R2	(France) Nogaro	(France) No. 27 Herrero Racing	(France) **No. 27 Herrero Racing**	(France) No. 27 Herrero Racing	(France) No. 63 Herrero Racing
1	R2	(France) Nogaro	(Belgium) Ugo de Wilde	(Belgium) **Ugo de Wilde**	(Belgium) Ugo de Wilde	(France) Stéphane Auriacombe
2	R1	(France) Magny-Cours	(France) No. 1 Autosport GP	**(France) No. 1 Autosport GP**	(France) No. 31 Méric Competition	(France) No. 63 Herrero Racing
2	R1	(France) Magny-Cours	(France) Jean-Baptiste Mela	**(France) Jean-Baptiste Mela**	(France) Louis Méric	(France) Stéphane Auriacombe
2	R2	(France) Magny-Cours	(France) No. 1 Autosport GP	**(France) No. 1 Autosport GP**	(France) No. 44 Patrick Roger Autosport GP	(France) No. 63 Herrero Racing
2	R2	(France) Magny-Cours	(France) Jean-Baptiste Mela	**(France) Jean-Baptiste Mela**	(France) Lilou Wadoux	(France) Stéphane Auriacombe
3	R1	(Belgium) Spa	(France) No. 69 LSGroup Autosport GP	**(France) No. 69 LSGroup Autosport GP**	(France) No. 27 Herrero Racing	(France) No. 63 Herrero Racing
3	R1	(Belgium) Spa	(France) Laurent Hurgon	**(France) Laurent Hurgon**	(Belgium) Ugo de Wilde	(France) Stéphane Auriacombe
3	R2	(Belgium) Spa	(France) No. 27 Herrero Racing	**(France) No. 110 Chazel Technologie Course**	(France) No. 44 Patrick Roger Autosport GP	(France) No. 63 Herrero Racing
3	R2	(Belgium) Spa	(Belgium) Ugo de Wilde	**(Spain) Dani Clos**	(France) Lilou Wadoux	(France) Stéphane Auriacombe
4	R1	(Spain) Barcelona	(France) No. 8 Autosport GP	**(France) No. 8 Autosport GP**	(France) No. 8 Autosport GP	(France) No. 63 Herrero Racing
4	R1	(Spain) Barcelona	(France) Simon Tirman	**(France) Simon Tirman**	(France) Simon Tirman	(France) Stéphane Auriacombe
4	R2	(Spain) Barcelona	(France) No. 1 Autosport GP	**(France) No. 1 Autosport GP**	(France) No. 27 Herrero Racing	(France) No. 9 Chazel Technologie Course
4	R2	(Spain) Barcelona	(France) Jean-Baptiste Mela	**(France) Jean-Baptiste Mela**	(Belgium) Ugo de Wilde	(Belgium) Philippe Bourgois
5	R1	(France) Paul Ricard	(France) No. 27 Herrero Racing	**(France) No. 27 Herrero Racing**	(France) No. 27 Herrero Racing	(France) No. 4 Herrero Racing
5	R1	(France) Paul Ricard	(Belgium) Ugo de Wilde	**(Belgium) Ugo de Wilde**	(Belgium) Ugo de Wilde	(France) Mathieu Blaise
5	R2	(France) Paul Ricard	(France) No. 93 Chazel Technologie Course	**(France) No. 27 Herrero Racing**	(France) No. 27 Herrero Racing	(France) No. 4 Herrero Racing
5	R2	(France) Paul Ricard	(France) Lucas Frayssinet	**(Belgium) Ugo de Wilde**	(Belgium) Ugo de Wilde	(France) Mathieu Blaise
6	R1	(Portugal) Portimão	(France) No. 27 Herrero Racing	**(France) No. 44 Patrick Roger Autosport GP**	(France) No. 44 Patrick Roger Autosport GP	(France) No. 9 Chazel Technologie Course
6	R1	(Portugal) Portimão	(Belgium) Ugo de Wilde	**(France) Lilou Wadoux**	(France) Lilou Wadoux	(Belgium) Philippe Bourgois
6	R2	(Portugal) Portimão	(France) No. 27 Herrero Racing	(France) **No. 27 Herrero Racing**	(France) No. 27 Herrero Racing	(France) No. 9 Chazel Technologie Course
6	R2	(Portugal) Portimão	(Belgium) Ugo de Wilde	(Belgium) **Ugo de Wilde**	(Belgium) Ugo de Wilde	(Belgium) Philippe Bourgois

== Championship standings ==
Scoring System

Points are awarded to the top 20 drivers. If less than 75% of the race distance is completed then half points are awarded. If less than two laps are completed then no points are given.

Drivers' Championship

Position	1st	2nd	3rd	4th	5th	6th	7th	8th	9th	10th	11th-20th	PP	FL
Points	20	15	12	10	8	6	5	4	3	2	1	1	1

Gentlemen's Championship

Position	1st	2nd	3rd	4th	5th	6th	7th	8th	9th	10th	11th-20th
Points	15	12	10	8	7	6	5	4	3	2	1

=== Drivers' Championship ===
Pos.	Driver	NOG (France)		MAG (France)		SPA (Belgium)		CAT (Spain)		LEC (France)		POR (Portugal)		Pts.
1	(France) Jean-Baptiste Mela	6	4	1	1	3	2	5	1	2	3	4	3	173
2	(Belgium) Ugo de Wilde J	2	1	DNS	Ret	2	4	3	3	1	1	3	1	169
3	(France) Lilou Wadoux J	3	2	5	3	4	3	2	4	6	2	1	2	156
4	(France) Laurent Hurgon	1	3	DNS	2	1	13	4	2	3	19	2	4	133
5	(France) Corentin Tierce J	4	6	DNS	5	9	6	6	5	8	6	5	Ret	70
6	(France) Louis Méric J	5	5	3	Ret	6	Ret	11	Ret	5	5	15	5	67
7	(France) Simon Tirman J	7	7	Ret	6	7	Ret	1	12	4	11	14	7	63
8	(Poland) Gosia Rdest	8	8	4	8	13	5	8	10	9	7	6	6	63
9	(France) Stéphane Auriacombe G	18	10	6	7	10	7	10	9	13	9	8	9	45
10	(France) Lucas Frayssinet J					8	9	7	Ret	7	4			30
11	(Belgium) Philippe Bourgois G	11	11	9	13	DNS	Ret	13	7	Ret	10	7	8	26
12	(France) Laurent Richard G					11	8	12	8	Ret	14	16	13	16
13	(France) Pierre Macchi G	15	13	12	11	12	11			16	18	12	15	13
14	(Monaco) Grégory Romano G	Ret	17	15	14	14	12	14	11	14	16	13	16	14
15	(France) Franck Labescat G	9	Ret	7	Ret					12	13			11
16	(France) Stéphane Proux G	16	15	11	10	15	10							11
17	(France) Thomas Dagoneau	12	DNS	8	9									10
18	(France) Franc Rouxel G	17	16	14	15			15	13	15	17	Ret	14	9
19	(France) Anthony Fournier G									17	15	11	11	7
20	(France) Mathieu Blaise G									10	8			6
21	(France) Henri Lombard J	10	12	10	Ret									6
22	(France) Luc Rozentvaig G	14	14	13	12	16	DNS							5
23	(France) Frédéric Roy G			16	16									2
24	(France) Maxime Hassid G									18				1
25	(France) Henry Hassid G										Ret			0
26	(France) Jean-Paul Dominici G											10	12	0
Drivers ineligible to score points
	(France) Manu Guigou	13	9											
	(France) Bruce Jouanny			2	4									
	(Spain) Dani Clos					5	1							
	(France) Tugdual Rabreau G							9	6					
	(Belgium) Stéphane De Groodt G									11	12			
	(France) Philippe Quetaud G											9	10	
Pos.	Driver	NOG (France)		MAG (France)		SPA (Belgium)		CAT (Spain)		LEC (France)		POR (Portugal)		Pts.

=== Gentlemen's Championship ===
Pos.	Driver	NOG (France)		MAG (France)		SPA (Belgium)		CAT (Spain)		LEC (France)		POR (Portugal)		Pts.
1	(France) Stéphane Auriacombe	18	10	6	7	10	7	10	9	13	9	8	9	151
2	(Belgium) Philippe Bourgois	11	11	9	13	DNS	Ret	13	7	Ret	10	7	8	106
3	(France) Pierre Macchi	15	13	12	11	12	11			16	18	12	15	76
4	(Monaco) Grégory Romano	Ret	17	15	14	14	12	14	11	14	16	13	16	72
5	(France) Laurent Richard					11	8	12	8	Ret	14	16	13	69
6	(France) Franc Rouxel	17	16	14	15			15	13	15	17	Ret	14	53
7	(France) Stéphane Proux	16	15	11	10	15	10							51
8	(France) Franck Labescat	9	Ret	7	Ret					12	13			47
9	(France) Luc Rozentvaig	14	14	13	12	16	DNS							38
10	(France) Anthony Fournier									17	15	11	11	31
11	(France) Mathieu Blaise									10	8			30
12	(France) Frédéric Roy			16	16									7
13	(France) Maxime Hassid									18				4
14	(France) Henry Hassid										Ret			0
15	(France) Jean-Paul Dominici											10	12	0
Pos.	Driver	NOG (France)		MAG (France)		SPA (Belgium)		CAT (Spain)		LEC (France)		POR (Portugal)		Pts.
