= Circuit de Nevers Magny-Cours =

Motorsport track in France

- Grand Prix Circuit (2003–present)
- Location: Magny-Cours, France
- Coordinates: 46°51′48″N 03°09′48″E
- Capacity: 139,112
- FIA Grade: 1
- Owner: Conseil Départemental de la Nièvre (1986–present)
- Opened: 7 August 1960; 66 years ago
- Former names: Circuit Jean Behra (1960–1970)
- Major events: Current: World SBK (1991, 2003–present); GT World Challenge Europe (2020–2022, 2024–present); FFSA GT (1997–present); Former: Formula One; French Grand Prix (1991–2008); WTCC; Race of France (2005–2006); Grand Prix motorcycle racing French motorcycle Grand Prix (1992); Bol d'Or (2000–2014); International GT Open (2006–2011); World Sportscar Championship (1991–1992); FIA GT (2000–2005); Superleague Formula (2009–2010)
- Website: https://www.circuitmagnycours.com

Grand Prix Circuit (2003–present)
- Length: 4.411 km (2.741 mi)
- Turns: 17
- Race lap record: 1:15.377 ( (Germany) Michael Schumacher, Ferrari F2004, 2004, F1)

National Circuit (2003–present)
- Length: 2.684 km (1.668 mi)
- Turns: 12

Club Circuit (1992–present)
- Length: 1.727 km (1.073 mi)
- Turns: 11

Grand Prix Circuit (1992–2002)
- Length: 4.250 km (2.641 mi)
- Turns: 15
- Race lap record: 1:15.045 ( (United Kingdom) David Coulthard, McLaren MP4-17, 2002, F1)

Grand Prix Circuit (1989–1991)
- Length: 4.271 km (2.654 mi)
- Turns: 17
- Race lap record: 1:19.168 ( (United Kingdom) Nigel Mansell, Williams FW14, 1991, F1)

Full Circuit (1971–1988)
- Length: 3.850 km (2.392 mi)
- Turns: 14
- Race lap record: 1:20.200 ( (France) Jacques Laffite, Martini MK16, 1975, F2)

Original Circuit (1960–1988)
- Length: 1.995 km (1.240 mi)
- Turns: 5
- Race lap record: 0:47.900 ( (Australia) Paul Hawkins, Lola T70 Mk.IIIB GT, 1969, Group 4)

Circuit de Nevers Magny-Cours is a 4.411 km (2.741 mi) motor racing circuit located in central France, near the towns of Magny-Cours and Nevers, some 250 km (160 mi) from Paris and 240 km (150 mi) from Lyon.

It staged the Formula One French Grand Prix from 1991 (succeeding Circuit Paul Ricard) to 2008, and the 24-hour Bol d'Or motorcycle endurance events from 2000 to 2014 (succeeded by Circuit Paul Ricard). It hosted the French motorcycle Grand Prix in 1992, and the Superbike World Championship in 1991 and annually since 2003.

Magny-Cours has hosted several additional international championships, like the World Sportscar Championship, World Touring Car Championship, FIA GT Championship, World Series by Renault and Formula 3 Euroseries. Also, the FFSA GT Championship has visited the circuit since 1997.

A campus of the French engineering college Institut supérieur de l'automobile et des transports is also located on the circuit, as well as the museum Conservatoire de la monoplace française.

== History ==
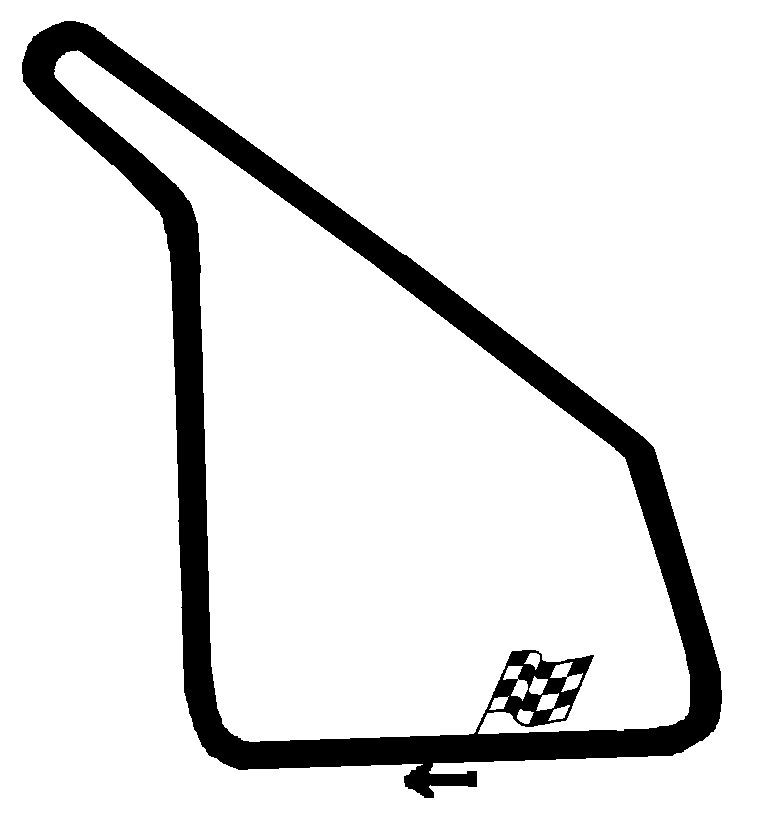
The original circuit layout (1960–1970), while the track was named after Jean Behra

Commonly dubbed Magny-Cours, it was built in 1960 by Jean Bernigaud and was home to the prestigious Winfield racing school (École de Pilotage Winfield), which produced drivers such as François Cevert, Jacques Laffite and Didier Pironi. The circuit was opened on 7 August 1960. However, in the 1980s the track fell into disrepair and was not used for international motor racing until it was purchased by the Conseil Départemental de la Nièvre in 1986.

In the 1990s, the Ligier Formula One team and its successor Prost were based at the circuit and did much of their testing at Magny-Cours.

The circuit hosted the French Formula One Grand Prix from 1991 until 2008, and the Bol d'Or from 2000 until 2014.

The circuit was re-designed in 2003 and used for a wide range of events include various sports and commercial use. For the 2003 French Grand Prix, the final corner and chicane were changed in an effort to increase overtaking, with little effect.

Michael Schumacher was able to win the 2004 French Grand Prix using an unprecedented four-stop strategy.

In 2006, Michael Schumacher became the first driver ever to win any single Formula One Grand Prix a total of 8 times and at the same circuit.

Bernie Ecclestone originally confirmed that F1 would not return to Magny-Cours in 2008, instead moving to an alternative location possibly in Paris. However in a striking U-turn, it was revealed that the 2008 French Grand Prix would take place at Magny-Cours with the release of the official calendar in July 2007.

In May 2008, Ecclestone confirmed that Magny-Cours would stop hosting the French Grand Prix after the 2008 race, suggesting that he was looking into the possibility of hosting the French Grand Prix on the streets of Paris. The venue suffered from poor attendances due to its remote location, poor access and insufficient accommodation.

In June 2008, the provisional calendar for the 2009 season was released, and a French Grand Prix at Magny-Cours appeared on it, scheduled for 28 June. However, in October 2008 the 2009 French Grand Prix was cancelled after the French Motorsports Federation (FFSA) withdrew financing for the event. In 2009 the track hosted its first Superleague Formula event. It also hosted a second event in 2010.

The circuit was used as part of stage three of the 2014 Paris–Nice cycling race, with the peloton completing almost a full lap of the circuit – in the reverse direction to its motorsport use – before the finish on the front straight. The circuit is going to be the starting point of the 2026 Tour de France's Stage 12.

== The circuit ==
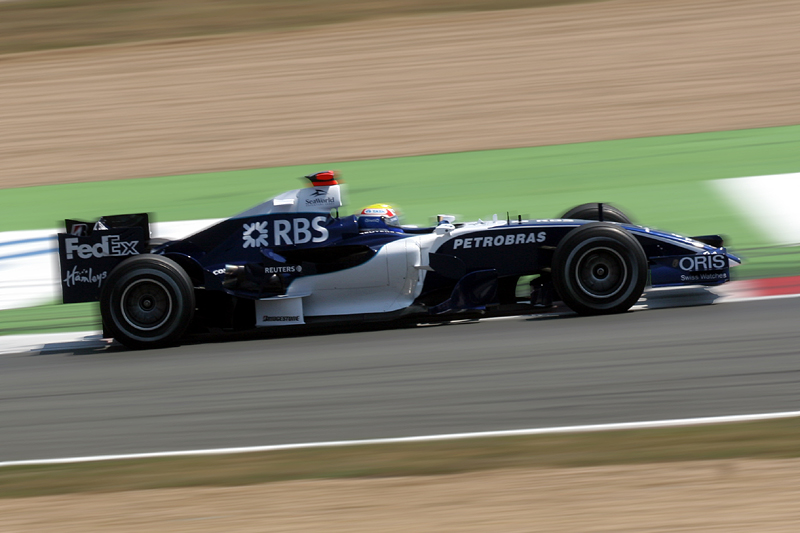
The circuit features several high-speed chicanes with prominent kerbs, such as the Imola chicane. (Mark Webber pictured driving for Williams).

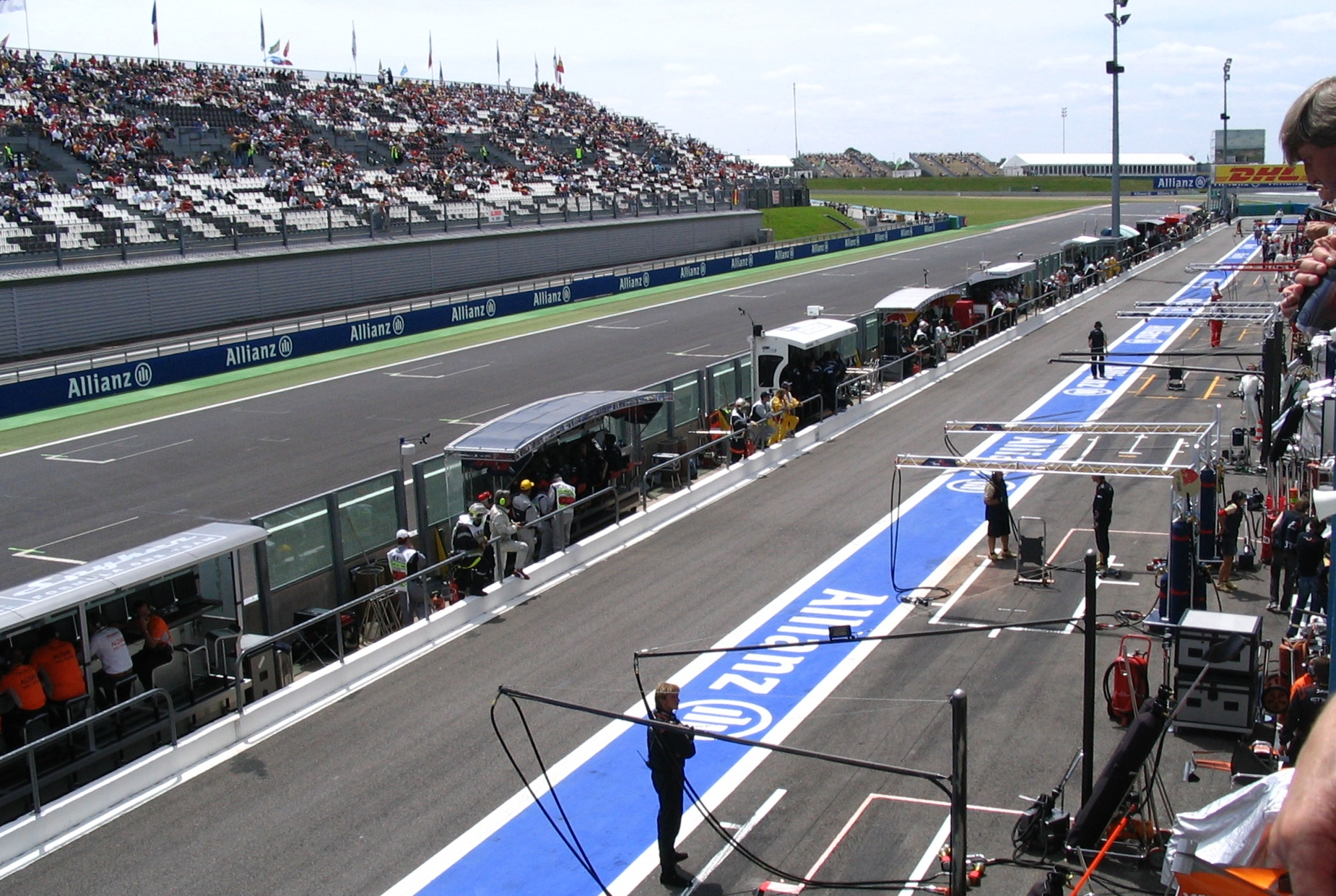
Main straight.

The track nowadays is a smooth circuit with good facilities for the teams, although restricted access prevents spectators from reaching many parts of the circuit. Unusually, many corners are modelled on famous turns from other circuits, and are named after those circuits, i.e.. the fast Estoril corner (turn 3), the Adelaide hairpin (turn 5) and the Nürburgring and Imola chicanes (turns 7 and 12 respectively). It has a mix of slow hairpins and high-speed chicane sections which includes a long fast straight into the first-gear Adelaide hairpin, the best overtaking opportunity on the circuit. The circuit is very flat with negligible change in elevation (only a small valley at the Estoril corner and a slight hill near the Lycee corner).

The circuit provides few overtaking opportunities, despite modifications in 2003, which means the races here are commonly regarded as quite uneventful. Formula 1 races at Magny-Cours tend to have a processional nature, with most overtaking occurring during pit stop sequences.

More varied racing occurs when it rains, such as in the 1999 race, which was interrupted by a downpour. After a restart, most top contenders developed problems, which paved the way for Heinz-Harald Frentzen to claim a surprising victory in his Jordan.

Although the Bol d'Or 24-hour motorcycle endurance race was held at Magny-Cours for several years, it returned to the more popular Circuit Paul Ricard in 2015, which held the mentioned race before Magny-Cours.

== Events ==
Current

- May: Ultimate Cup Series, Fun Cup France, Grand Prix de France de Superkart
- July: BOSS GP Magny-Cours Racing Cup, FIM Moto3 Junior World Championship, FIM Moto2 European Championship, Moto4 European Cup, FIM Stock European Championship
- August: GT World Challenge Europe, FFSA GT Championship, French F4 Championship, Alpine Elf Cup Series, Porsche Carrera Cup France, TC France Series
- September: Superbike World Championship, Supersport World Championship, Sportbike World Championship, French Superbike Championship
- October: Historic Tour Magny-Cours

Future

- FIM Women's Circuit Racing World Championship (2025, 2027)

Former

- Auto GP (2003, 2007, 2009–2010)
- British Formula 3 International Series (2010)
- British GT Championship (2005–2006)
- EFDA Nations Cup (1995)
- Eurocup Mégane Trophy (2007, 2010)
- European F3 Open Championship (2006–2011)
- European Touring Car Championship (2001–2004)
- European Touring Car Cup (2016)
- FIA European Formula 3 Championship (1978–1984)
- FIA GT Championship (2000–2005)
- FIA Sportscar Championship (1999–2002)
- FIM Endurance World Championship
  - Bol d'Or (2000–2014)
- Formula 3 Euro Series (2003–2004, 2007)
- Formula 750 (1975)
- Formula One
  - French Grand Prix (1991–2008)
- Formula Palmer Audi (2000)
- Formula Renault 3.5 Series (2007, 2010)
- Formula Renault Eurocup (1993–1996, 2000–2002, 2004, 2007, 2010, 2020)
- Formula Renault V6 Eurocup (2003–2004)
- French Formula Renault Championship (1971–1973, 1975–1987, 1989–2009)
- French Formula Three Championship (1964–1973, 1978–1987, 1989–2002)
- French Supertouring Championship (1976–1987, 1989–1990, 1992–1994, 1997–2005)
- GP2 Series (2005–2008)
- Grand Prix motorcycle racing
  - French motorcycle Grand Prix (1992)
- GT4 European Cup (2007, 2010)
- International Formula 3000 (1992–1996, 1999–2004)
- International GT Open (2006–2011)
- Italian Superturismo Championship (2005–2006)
- International Touring Car Championship (1995–1996)
- Porsche Carrera Cup Italia (2013)
- Porsche Supercup (1993–1997, 2000, 2003–2008)
- Racecar Euro Series (2009, 2011)
- Sidecar World Championship (1992, 2003, 2010)
- Supercar Challenge (2019)
- Superleague Formula
  - Superleague Formula round France (2009–2010)
- Supersport 300 World Championship (2017–2025)
- Trofeo Maserati (2003–2004)
- World Series by Nissan (2000–2004)
- World Sportscar Championship
  - Championnat du Monde de Voitures de Sport (1991–1992)
- World Touring Car Championship
  - FIA WTCC Race of France (2005–2006)

== Lap records ==
The official lap record for the latest Grand Prix circuit layout is 1:15.377, set by Michael Schumacher during the 2004 French Grand Prix, while the unofficial all-time track record is 1:13.698, set by Fernando Alonso in qualifying for the same race. As of September 2026, the fastest official race lap records at the Circuit de Nevers Magny-Cours are listed as:

Category	Time	Driver	Vehicle	Event	Circuit Map
Grand Prix Circuit (2003–present): 4.412 km (2.741 mi)
Formula One	1:15.377	(Germany) Michael Schumacher	Ferrari F2004	2004 French Grand Prix	
GP2	1:23.405	(Spain) Roldán Rodríguez	Dallara GP2/05	2007 Magny-Cours GP2 Series round	
Superleague Formula	1:26.722	(Netherlands) Yelmer Buurman	Panoz DP09	2010 Magny-Cours Superleague Formula round	
Formula Renault 3.5	1:27.543	(Portugal) Filipe Albuquerque	Dallara T05	2007 Magny-Cours Formula Renault 3.5 Series round	
F3000	1:28.172	(Italy) Fabrizio Crestani	Lola B02/50	2009 Magny-Cours Euroseries 3000 round	
Formula Nissan	1:29.872	(Finland) Heikki Kovalainen	Dallara SN01	2004 Magny-Cours World Series by Nissan round	
F2 (2009–2012)	1:32.085	(Spain) Miki Monrás	Williams JPH1B	2011 Magny-Cours F2 round	
LMP3	1:32.476	(France) Alessandro Ghiretti	Ligier JS P3	2020 2nd Magny-Cours Ultimate Cup Series round	
Formula Three	1:32.972	(Switzerland) Sébastien Buemi	Dallara F305	2007 Magny-Cours F3 Euro Series round	
Formula Regional	1:33.943	(Argentina) Franco Colapinto	Tatuus FR-19	2020 Magny-Cours Formula Renault Eurocup round	
World SBK	1:34.750	(Italy) Nicolò Bulega	Ducati Panigale V4 R	2026 Magny-Cours World SBK round	
GT3	1:36.215	(France) Emmanuel Collard	Mercedes-AMG GT3 Evo	2022 Magny-Cours Ultimate Cup Series round	
LMPC	1:36.529	(Austria) Dominik Kraihamer	Oreca FLM09	2009 Magny-Cours Formula Le Mans Cup round	
Moto2	1:37.793	(Spain) Unai Orradre	Kalex Moto2	2026 Magny-Cours Moto2 European Championship round	
GT1 (GTS)	1:38.625	(Italy) Matteo Bobbi	Ferrari 550-GTS Maranello	2003 FIA GT Magny-Cours 500km	
Formula Renault 2.0	1:38.769	(United Kingdom) Luciano Bacheta	Barazi-Epsilon FR2.0-10	2010 Magny-Cours Eurocup Formula Renault 2.0 round	
Porsche Carrera Cup	1:39.505	(France) Dorian Boccolacci	Porsche 911 (992 I) GT3 Cup	2021 Magny-Cours Porsche Carrera Cup France round	
Formula 4	1:39.790	(Belgium) Yani Stevenheydens	Mygale M21-F4	2024 Magny-Cours French Formula 4 round	
World SSP	1:39.868	(United Kingdom) Tom Booth-Amos	Triumph Street Triple RS 765	2026 Magny-Cours World SSP round	
GT2	1:40.534	(Italy) Gianluca Roda	Porsche 911 (997) GT3-RSR	2009 Magny-Cours GT Open round	
N-GT	1:42.916	(Germany) Lucas Luhr	Porsche 911 (996) GT3-RSR	2004 FIA GT Magny-Cours 500km	
Lamborghini Super Trofeo	1:44.117	(Netherlands) Max Weering	Lamborghini Huracán LP 620-2 Super Trofeo EVO	2019 Magny-Cours Supercar Challenge round	
Formula Renault 1.6	1:44.737	(France) Victor Martins	Signatech FR 1.6	2017 Magny-Cours French F4 round	
FIA GT Group 2	1:44.920	(United Kingdom) Shaun Balfe	Mosler MT900R	2005 FIA GT Magny-Cours Supercar 500	
Moto3	1:44.959	(Spain) Carlos Cano	CFMoto Moto3	2026 Magny-Cours Moto3 World Championship round	
World SPB	1:45.373	(Spain) Xavier Artigas	Kawasaki Ninja ZX-6R 636	2026 Magny-Cours World SPB round	
GT4	1:45.569	(France) Anthony Beltoise	Audi R8 LMS GT4 Evo	2021 Magny-Cours French GT4 round	
Eurocup Mégane Trophy	1:45.627	(Netherlands) Nicky Catsburg	Renault Mégane Renault Sport II	2010 Magny-Cours Eurocup Mégane Trophy round	
TCR Touring Car	1:46.597	(France) Sébastien Thome	Audi RS 3 LMS TCR (2021)	2024 Magny-Cours TC France round	
Alpine Elf Europa Cup	1:46.953	(France) Jean-Baptiste Mela	Alpine A110 Cup	2021 Magny-Cours Alpine Elf Europa Cup round	
Silhouette racing car	1:47.656	(France) Éric Hélary	Peugeot 406 Coupé	2003 Magny-Cours French Supertouring round	
Super 2000	1:50.192	(United Kingdom) Andy Priaulx	BMW 320i	2004 Magny-Cours ETCC round	
World WCR	1:51.414	(United Kingdom) Chloe Jones	Yamaha YZF-R7	2025 Magny-Cours World WCR round	
Supersport 300	1:51.835	(Italy) Matteo Vannucci	Yamaha YZF-R3	2025 Magny-Cours Supersport 300 round	
Renault Clio Cup	1:56.806	(France) Jeremy Sarhy	Renault Clio R.S. IV	2017 Magny-Cours Renault Clio Cup France round	
Super 1600	2:04.461	(Czech Republic) Tomáš Korený	Ford Fiesta 1.6 16V	2016 Magny-Cours ETC round	
Grand Prix Circuit (1992–2002): 4.250 km (2.641 mi)
Formula One	1:15.045	(United Kingdom) David Coulthard	McLaren MP4-17	2002 French Grand Prix	
Group C	1:20.346	(France) Yannick Dalmas	Peugeot 905 Evo 1 Bis	1992 500 km of Magny-Cours	
F3000	1:27.802	(Czech Republic) Tomas Enge	Lola B02/50	2002 Magny-Cours F3000 round	
Formula Nissan	1:27.952	(Brazil) Ricardo Zonta	Dallara SN01	2002 Magny-Cours World Series by Nissan round	
LMP900	1:29.780	(Netherlands) Val Hillebrand	Dome S101	2002 FIA Sportscar Championship Magny-Cours	
WSC	1:30.928	(Italy) Christian Pescatori	Ferrari 333 SP	1999 Magny-Cours 2 Hours 30 Minutes	
Formula Three	1:32.098	(Japan) Ryo Fukuda	Dallara F399	2001 2nd Magny-Cours French F3 round	
Group C2	1:34.879	(Italy) Ranieri Randaccio	Spice SE90C	1992 500 km of Magny-Cours	
Class 1 Touring Cars	1:34.918	(Italy) Giancarlo Fisichella	Alfa Romeo 155 V6 TI	1996 Magny-Cours ITC round	
GT1 (GTS)	1:35.313	(United Kingdom) Jamie Campbell-Walter	Lister Storm	2002 FIA GT Magny-Cours 500km	
LMP675	1:35.812	(Italy) Massimo Saccomanno	Lucchini SR2-99	2002 FIA Sportscar Championship Magny-Cours	
Formula Renault 2.0	1:36.089	(France) Éric Salignon	Tatuus FR2000	2002 Magny-Cours Formula Renault 2000 Eurocup round	
500cc	1:39.273	(Australia) Wayne Gardner	Yamaha YZR500	1992 French motorcycle Grand Prix	
250cc	1:41.418	(Italy) Loris Reggiani	Aprilia RSV 250	1992 French motorcycle Grand Prix	
N-GT	1:41.441	(France) Christophe Bouchut	Porsche 911 (996) GT3-R	2000 FIA GT Magny-Cours 500km	
Silhouette racing car	1:43.851	(France) Christophe Bouchut	SEAT León Silhouette	2001 Magny-Cours French Supertouring round	
Super Touring	1:44.332	(Italy) Gabriele Tarquini	Honda Accord	2001 Magny-Cours ESTC round	
Porsche Carrera Cup	1:45.871	(Monaco) Stéphane Ortelli	Porsche 911 (996) GT3 Cup	2000 Magny-Cours Porsche Supercup round	
125cc	1:46.674	(Italy) Ezio Gianola	Honda RS125R	1992 French motorcycle Grand Prix	
Super 2000	1:47.908	(Italy) Nicola Larini	Honda Accord	2002 Magny-Cours ETCC round	
Grand Prix Circuit (1989–1991): 4.271 km (2.654 mi)
Formula One	1:19.168	(United Kingdom) Nigel Mansell	Williams FW14	1991 French Grand Prix	
Group C	1:25.823	(France) Philippe Alliot	Peugeot 905 Evo 1 Bis	1991 430 km of Magny-Cours	
Formula Three	1:36.210	(France) Ludovic Faure	Ralt RT35	1991 1st Magny-Cours French F3 round	
World SBK	1:44.980	(United States) Doug Polen	Ducati 888 SBK	1991 Magny-Cours World SBK round	
Formula Renault 2.0	1:45.750	(France) Olivier Couvreur	Alpa FR91	1991 1st Magny-Cours French Formula Renault round	
Full Circuit (1971–1988): 3.850 km (2.392 mi)
Formula Two	1:20.200	(France) Jacques Laffite	Martini MK16	1975 Grand Prix de Magny-Cours	
Formula Three	1:23.170	(Denmark) John Nielsen	Ralt RT3	1984 Magny-Cours European F3 round	
Group 6	1:23.669	(France) Dominique Lacaud	Lola T298	1984 Magny-Cours French Group 6 race	
Formula Renault 2.0	1:30.510	(France) Christophe Bodin	Martini MK36	1982 Magny-Cours French Formula Renault round	
Group A	1:34.640	(France) Fabien Giroix	BMW M3 (E30)	1987 Magny-Cours French Supertouring Group A round	
Original Circuit (1960–1988): 1.995 km (1.240 mi)
Group 4	0:47.900	(Australia) Paul Hawkins	Lola T70 Mk.IIIB GT	1969 Magny-Cours Group 4 race	
Formula Three	0:49.000	(France) Patrick Depailler	Alpine A330	1969 2nd Magny-Cours French F3 round	
Formula Renault 2.0	0:53.300	(France) Alain Cudini	Martini MK36	1970 Magny-Cours French Formula Renault round	

== Weather and climate ==
The Nevers area has an oceanic climate that is still influenced by its far inland position. With a yearly precipitation of over 800 mm (31 in) on average, Magny-Cours is theoretically prone to rain affecting proceedings, although in the Formula One era, it often evaded the rainfall. There was one notable exception, when both the qualifying and the race of 1999 saw a fully wet track. With the Grand Prix being held in the middle of summer, tyre wear through high asphalt temperatures was possible. Magny-Cours' main event post-Grand Prix era, Superbike World Championship is being held in autumn and as a result sees colder temperatures.

Climate data for Nevers (1981–2010 averages)
Month	Jan	Feb	Mar	Apr	May	Jun	Jul	Aug	Sep	Oct	Nov	Dec	Year
Record high °C (°F)	17.2 (63.0)	23.5 (74.3)	26.7 (80.1)	30.0 (86.0)	31.0 (87.8)	37.5 (99.5)	38.7 (101.7)	39.2 (102.6)	35.1 (95.2)	30.2 (86.4)	23.5 (74.3)	19.5 (67.1)	39.2 (102.6)
Mean daily maximum °C (°F)	6.7 (44.1)	8.3 (46.9)	12.4 (54.3)	15.4 (59.7)	19.4 (66.9)	22.8 (73.0)	25.5 (77.9)	25.2 (77.4)	21.4 (70.5)	16.7 (62.1)	10.5 (50.9)	7.1 (44.8)	16.0 (60.8)
Mean daily minimum °C (°F)	0.2 (32.4)	−0.1 (31.8)	1.8 (35.2)	3.9 (39.0)	7.9 (46.2)	10.9 (51.6)	12.8 (55.0)	12.3 (54.1)	9.1 (48.4)	7.0 (44.6)	2.8 (37.0)	0.8 (33.4)	5.8 (42.4)
Record low °C (°F)	−25 (−13)	−21.8 (−7.2)	−13.8 (7.2)	−7.5 (18.5)	−4.8 (23.4)	0.2 (32.4)	3.4 (38.1)	0.3 (32.5)	−1.2 (29.8)	−8.9 (16.0)	−12.3 (9.9)	−16.8 (1.8)	−25 (−13)
Average precipitation mm (inches)	62.0 (2.44)	57.8 (2.28)	54.3 (2.14)	68.7 (2.70)	80.1 (3.15)	70.1 (2.76)	61.8 (2.43)	60.9 (2.40)	67.5 (2.66)	77.6 (3.06)	70.1 (2.76)	73.2 (2.88)	804.1 (31.66)
Average precipitation days	12.0	10.0	10.3	10.7	11.5	8.8	8.3	8.3	8.4	11.0	11.6	11.7	122.7
Average relative humidity (%)	87	82	78	74	77	76	74	77	80	85	87	87	80.3
Mean monthly sunshine hours	65.5	85.6	147.7	170.3	197.9	223.2	235.0	227.5	180.0	121.0	65.4	54.9	1,774
Source 1: Météo France
Source 2: Infoclimat.fr (humidity, 1961–1990)

== Fatalities ==
- Borja Gómez - 2025 FIM Stock European Championship.

Preceded by Circuit Paul Ricard	Host of the French Grand Prix; 1991 to 2008	Succeeded by Circuit Paul Ricard
