= Andrew Watson (racing driver) =

British managing director and former racing driver (born 1995)

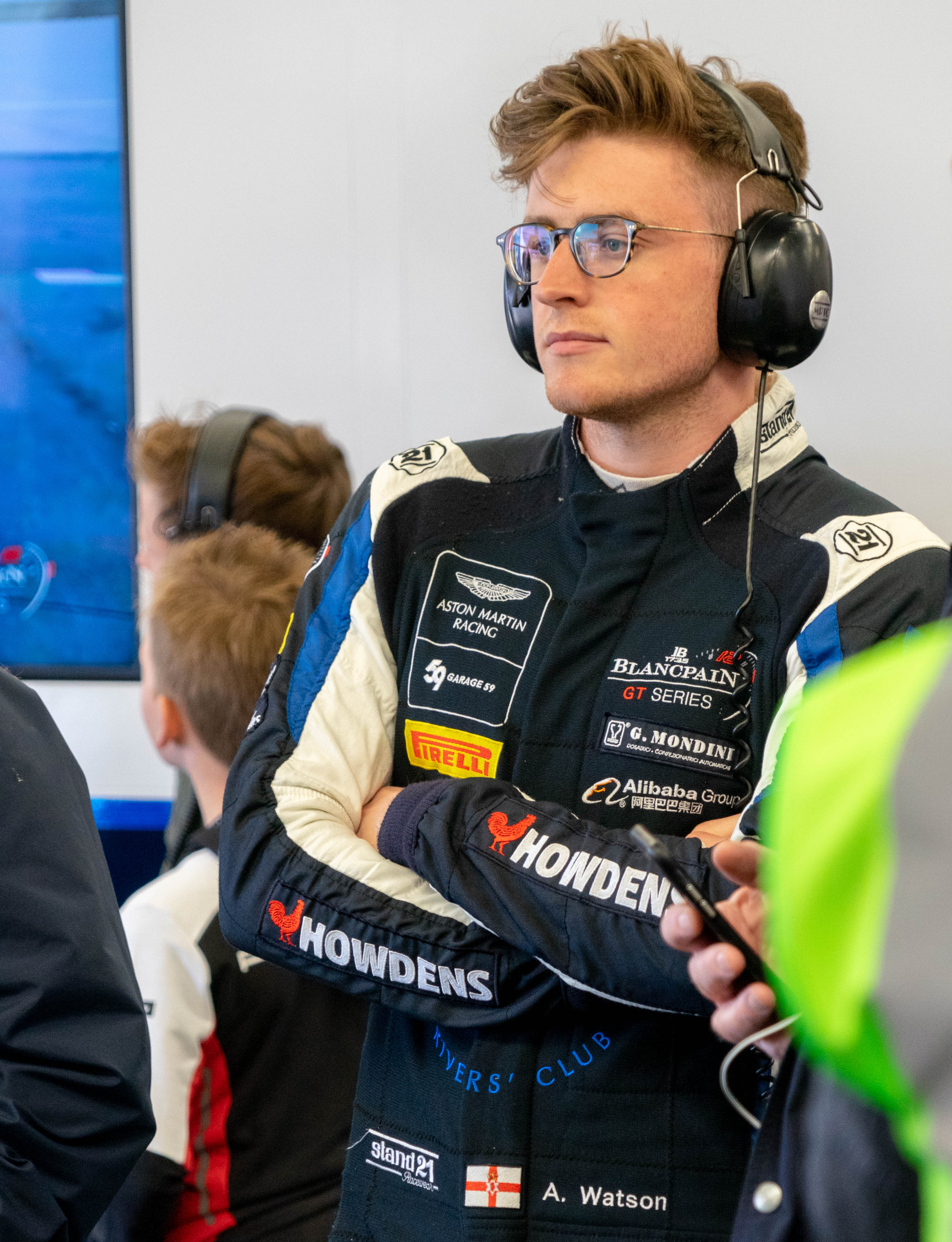
- Watson at Silverstone Circuit in 2019
- Nationality: (United Kingdom) British
- Born: Andrew Robert Watson; 21 January 1995 (age 31) Belfast, Northern Ireland

British Touring Car Championship career
- Debut season: 2023
- Current team: Toyota Gazoo Racing UK
- Categorisation: FIA Silver (until 2021); FIA Gold (2022–)
- Car number: 11
- Former teams: Power Maxed Racing
- Starts: 60 (60 entries)
- Wins: 0
- Podiums: 2
- Poles: 0
- Fastest laps: 0
- Best finish: 14th in 2024

Previous series
- 2022 2021, 2019-20 2016-2020 2016-2020 2020 2020 2016-2018 2017, 2015 2015 2014, 2013 2012, 2011: ALMS; FIA WEC; Intercontinental GT Challenge; GT World Challenge Europe Endurance Cup; IMSA SportsCar Championship; ELMS; Blancpain GT Series Sprint Cup; British GT; International GT Open; Ginetta GT4 Supercup; Ginetta Junior Championship

Championship titles
- 2023: Jack Sears Trophy

Andrew Robert Watson (born 21 January 1995) is a British former racing driver and managing director, currently working at Parts Control. He most recently competed in the 2024 British Touring Car Championship for Toyota Gazoo Racing UK.

Throughout his career, Watson has competed in sports car racing and endurance racing, until his switch to touring car racing in 2023. He is a former Aston Martin Racing junior.

== Racing career ==
=== Early career ===
Watson began his motor racing career at the age of 15, in the Ginetta Junior Ireland Championship, making regular podiums through to 2011. That year, he joined Douglas Motorsport team to race in the final two rounds of the Ginetta Junior Championship at Silverstone.

2012 saw Watson contest the entire Ginetta Junior championship season, again with Douglas Motorsport. The season saw him deliver fifth place in the Championship, achieving six podium places, including second places and his maiden victory, with only two non-finishes out of the twenty-round season.

=== 2013 – Ginetta GT Supercup ===
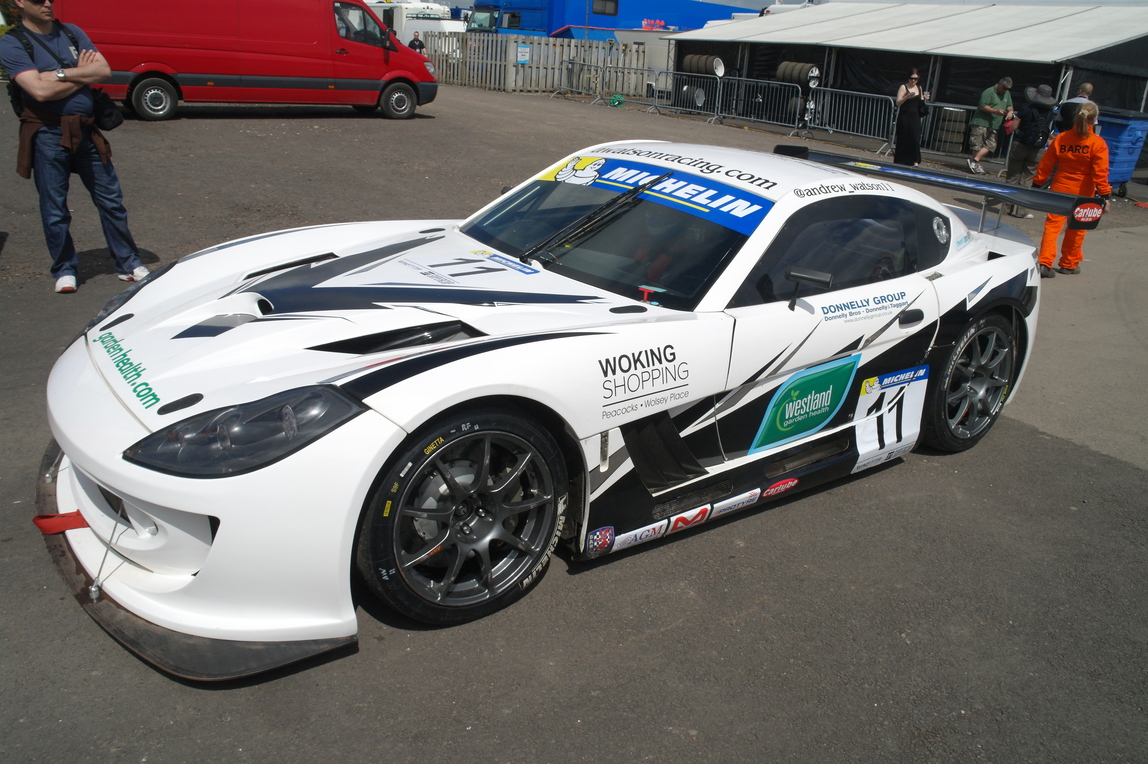
Andrew Watson Ginetta G55 Thruxton 2013

Watson's Ginetta Junior team decided to enter the senior competition, the Ginetta GT Supercup, using a Ginetta G55.

At the first meeting of the season at Brands Hatch Indy circuit, Watson qualified second despite having little experience in the much more powerful G55 car. This translated to a seventh-place finish in round 1, followed by an eighth place in round 2, both on the Saturday. Round 3 was held on Sunday an even more impressive finish in fourth place cemented his arrival in the senior ranks.

Success at Donington Park at the second meeting of the year, was not so easy to repeat but Watson did qualify third and managed to get the fastest lap in round 5.

Watson achieved his first podium in the GT Supercup, with a second-place finish in round 7, at the year's third meeting at Thruxton in Hampshire.

At Knockhill, Watson achieved pole position for round 18 (being the meeting's 1st race) on 24 August. This could not be converted to a maiden race win in the GT Supercup owing to him having to serve a drive-through penalty. He eventually finished the race in tenth place.

In round 20 at Knockhill, Watson led the race for 23 of the 24 lap race, however he was overtaken for the lead by championship leader Tom Ingram. A last corner overtake saw Matt Nicoll-Jones take second place with Watson gaining holding on to third place.

Watson finished the season in seventh place overall in the standings with 372 points.

=== 2014 – Ginetta GT4 Supercup ===
For the now renamed 2014 Ginetta GT4 Supercup, Watson stayed with long-term team Douglas Motorsport alongside a new teammate, Harry Woodhead, winner of the 2013 Ginetta Junior Championship.

Success came early, with pole position, fastest lap and a win in the opening round at Brands Hatch, followed by second and third-place finishes in the next two rounds. A further win at Thruxton in round 9 of the series, saw Watson leading the championship with 230 points.

Watson eventually finished the season in fourth place on 640 points.

=== 2015 – British GT Championship ===
In 2015, Watson made a switch to the British GT Championship driving a McLaren 650S GT3 for Von Ryan Racing as part of the McLaren Young Driver Programme. He competed in the GT3 class, a step-up from the GT4 class he previously drove in the 2014 Ginetta GT4 Supercup.

Watson scored his best result of the season when he and fellow McLaren GT “Young Driver” Ross Wylie finished seventh in the Silverstone 500 in May 2015, only 20 seconds behind the podium places. The race at Silverstone was preceded by races at Rockingham and Oulton Park. At Oulton Park in April 2015, Watson and his teammate Ross Wiley placed a ninth-place finish in the second race, whilst at Rockingham in May 2015, the team retired from the race on the opening lap following a collision.

Watson also raced in four races of the International Open GT Championship, scoring one race win and one pole position. In addition, Watson competed in the Sepang 12 Hours and secured a class victory.

=== 2016 – Blancpain GT Championship ===
For 2016, Watson raced in the Blancpain GT Series Endurance Cup with Garage 59 in a McLaren 650S GT3 as a member of the McLaren GT Young Driver Academy.

2016 also saw Watson make his debut at the famous Bathurst 12 hour race, where he finished a credible ninth overall on his first visit to the track.

=== 2017 – Blancpain GT Championship ===
Watson continued to race in the Blancpain GT Series Endurance Cup and also the Blancpain GT World Challenge Europe again behind the wheel of the McLaren 650s, but this time representing Strakka racing in the 2017 Blancpain GT Series.

=== 2018 – Blancpain GT Championship ===
Watson remained in the McLaren 650S GT3 racing with Garage 59 in the Blancpain GT Series Endurance Cup. His 2018 highlights included achieving pole position in the AM class at the Blancpain 24 Hours of Spa and pole position in the PRO Class at Paul Ricard. Watson also achieved an excellent podium position at the 1,000 kilometres of Paul Ricard as Andrew in the #58 Garage 59 McLaren qualified on the front row and led for the majority of the race, before eventually coming home in third place - marking a proud moment in Andrew's career as he achieved his first overall podium finish in the Blancpain GT Series.

Watson also raced in the Blancpain GT World Challenge Europe for 3Y in a BMW M6 GT3, which included race victory in the Silver Class at Brands Hatch.

=== 2019 – Blancpain GT Championship ===
Watson's 2019 season saw him compete in the European Blancpain GT Endurance Series with Andrew rejoining the Garage 59 team, following their switch to the Aston Martin Vantage GT3's for the 2019 Blancpain campaign.

=== 2019/20 – FIA World Endurance Championship ===
Watson was selected to join the Gulf Racing team in the 2019/20 FIA World Endurance Championship. Racing a Porsche 911 RSR, Andrew collected his maiden World Championship podium in Bahrain as the team finished third in the GTE-Am Class.

Watson also made his debut in the Aston Martin Vantage GTE as he featured in the FIA World Endurance Championship Rookie Test with Aston Martin Racing.

=== 2020 – Daytona 24 Hours ===
Watson made his Daytona 24 Hours debut in January 2020 after securing a late drive with Aston Martin Racing. Replacing the injured Paul Dalla Lana, he joined Pedro Lamy, Mathias Lauda and Ross Gunn in the No. 98 Aston Martin Vantage GT3. However, the team did not finish the race due to a crash after 189 completed laps.

=== 2020 – Bathurst 12 Hours ===
On his fourth appearance at the Bathurst 12 Hours, Andrew Watson celebrated a podium finish at the 2020 Bathurst 12 Hour endurance race.

Watson, along with Garage 59 team-mates Oliver Hart and Roman De Angelis, finished third in the Silver class and 14th overall at Mount Panorama behind the wheel on an Aston Martin Vantage GT3.

=== British Touring Car Championship ===
==== Power Maxed Racing (2023) ====
On 18 January 2023, it was announced that Watson would drive for CarStore Power Maxed Racing in the 2023 British Touring Car Championship, driving a Vauxhall Astra. This would be Watson's first time in touring car racing, and his first time racing a front-wheel drive car. He impressed on debut, qualifying ninth at the first round at Donington Park, ahead of teammate Árón Taylor-Smith and fellow rookie teammate Mikey Doble. In the first race of the weekend, he climbed five positions to finish fourth overall, and first in the Jack Sears Trophy.

== Racing record ==
=== Career summary ===
Season	Series	Team	Races	Wins	Poles	F/Laps	Podiums	Points	Position
2011	Ginetta Junior Championship	HHC Motorsport	2	0	0	0	0	28	19th
2012	Ginetta Junior Championship	Douglas Motorsport	20	1	0	2	6	367	5th
2012	Ginetta Junior Winter Series	Douglas Motorsport	3	1	1	1	1	55	6th
2013	Ginetta GT Supercup	Douglas Motorsport	27	0	0	2	3	372	7th
2014	Ginetta GT4 Supercup	Douglas Motorsport	27	5	1	5	12	608	4th
2015	International GT Open - GT3 Pro Am	Teo Martin Motorsport	4	1	1	0	1	13	10th
2015	British GT Championship	Von Ryan Racing	9	0	0	0	0	28	16th
2016	Blancpain GT Series Sprint Cup	Garage 59	2	0	0	0	0	0	NC
2016	Blancpain GT Series Endurance Cup	Garage 59	5	0	0	0	0	0	NC
2016	Intercontinental GT Challenge	Tekno Autosports	1	0	0	0	0	6	15th
2016	Intercontinental GT Challenge	Garage 59	1	0	0	0	0	6	15th
2017	Blancpain GT Series Endurance Cup	Strakka Racing	5	0	0	0	0	0	NC
2017	Blancpain GT Series Sprint Cup	Strakka Racing	10	0	0	0	0	6	21st
2017	Intercontinental GT Challenge	Strakka Racing	1	0	0	0	0	0	NC
2017	British GT Championship - GT4	Black Bull Garage 59	1	0	0	0	0	6	23rd
2018	Blancpain GT Series Endurance Cup	Garage 59	5	0	0	0	1	19	24th
2018	Blancpain GT Series Sprint Cup	3Y Technology	8	0	0	0	0	0.5	27th
2018	Blancpain GT Series Sprint Cup - Silver Cup	3Y Technology	8	1	0	0	1	49.5	5th
2018	Intercontinental GT Challenge	YNA Autosport	1	0	0	0	0	4	23rd
2018	Intercontinental GT Challenge	Garage 59	2	0	0	0	0	4	23rd
2019	Blancpain GT Series Endurance Cup	Garage 59	5	0	0	0	0	2	33rd
2019-20	FIA World Endurance Championship - GTE Am	Gulf Racing	7	0	0	0	1	70	13th
2020	24 Hours of Le Mans - GTE Am	Gulf Racing	1	0	0	0	0	N/A	5th
2020	European Le Mans Series - GTE	Gulf Racing UK	1	0	0	0	0	0	NC
2020	IMSA SportsCar Championship - GTD	Aston Martin Racing	1	0	0	0	0	14	58th
2020	GT World Challenge Europe Endurance Cup	Garage 59	5	0	0	0	0	0	NC
2020	Intercontinental GT Challenge	Garage 59	1	0	0	0	0	2	20th
2021	FIA World Endurance Championship - GTE Am	D'station Racing	6	0	0	0	1	51	9th
2021	24 Hours of Le Mans - GTE Am	D'station Racing	1	0	0	0	0	N/A	6th
2022	Asian Le Mans Series - GT	Inception Racing with Optimum Motorsport	4	0	0	0	0	38	5th
2023	British Touring Car Championship	CarStore Power Maxed Racing	30	0	0	0	2	92	15th
2024	British Touring Car Championship	Toyota Gazoo Racing UK	30	0	0	0	0	120	14th

=== Complete British GT Championship results ===
(key) (Races in bold indicate pole position) (Races in italics indicate fastest lap)

Year	Team	Car	Class	1	2	3	4	5	6	7	8	9	10	DC	Points
2015	Von Ryan Racing	McLaren 650S GT3	GT3	OUL; 1 Ret	OUL; 2; 9	ROC; 1 Ret	SIL; 1; 7	SPA; 1; 8	BRH; 1; 10	SNE; 1; 6	SNE; 2; 13	DON; 1; 10		16th	28
2017	Black Bull Garage 59	McLaren 570S GT4	GT4	OUL; 1	OUL; 2	ROC; 1	SNE; 1	SNE; 2	SIL; 1	SPA; 1	SPA; 2	BRH; 1	DON; 1; 14	23rd	6

=== Complete GT World Challenge Europe results ===
==== GT World Challenge Europe Endurance Cup ====
(key) (Races in bold indicate pole position; results in italics indicate fastest lap)

Year	Team	Car	Class	1	2	3	4	5	6	7	Pos	Points
2016	Garage 59	McLaren 650S GT3	Pro	MNZ; 36	SIL; 22	LEC; 14	SPA; 6H; 18	SPA; 12H; 61	SPA; 24H; Ret	NÜR; Ret	NC	0
2017	Strakka Racing	McLaren 650S GT3	Pro	MNZ; Ret	SIL; 29	LEC; 36	SPA; 6H; 58	SPA; 12H; 58	SPA; 24H; Ret	CAT; Ret	NC	0
2018	Garage 59	McLaren 650S GT3	Pro	MNZ; 15	SIL; 15	LEC; 3	SPA; 6H; 41	SPA; 12H; 28	SPA; 24H; 22	CAT; 26	24th	19
2019	Garage 59	Aston Martin Vantage AMR GT3	Pro	MNZ; 9	SIL; Ret	LEC; Ret	SPA; 6H; 71	SPA; 12H; 71	SPA; 24H; Ret	CAT; Ret	33rd	2
2020	Garage 59	Aston Martin Vantage AMR GT3	Silver	IMO; 14	NÜR; 12	SPA; 6H; 25	SPA; 12H; 44	SPA; 24H; Ret	LEC; Ret		4th	58

==== GT World Challenge Europe Sprint Cup ====
(key) (Races in bold indicate pole position; results in italics indicate fastest lap)

Year	Team	Car	Class	1	2	3	4	5	6	7	8	9	10	Pos.	Points
2016	Garage 59	McLaren 650S GT3	Pro	MIS; QR	MIS; CR	BRH; QR	BRH; CR	NÜR; QR	NÜR; CR	HUN; QR	HUN; CR	CAT; QR; 19	CAT; CR; 21	NC	0
2017	Strakka Racing	McLaren 650S GT3	Pro	MIS; QR; 18	MIS; CR; 8	BRH; QR; 15	BRH; CR; 21	ZOL; QR; 22	ZOL; CR; 11	HUN; QR; 24	HUN; CR; 17	NÜR; QR; 16	NÜR; CR; 9	21st	6
2018	3Y Technology	BMW M6 GT3	Silver	ZOL; 1; 17	ZOL; 2; 17	BRH; 1 DSQ	BRH; 2; 10	MIS; 1; 14	MIS; 2; 16	HUN; 1; 20	HUN; 2; 15	NÜR; 1	NÜR; 2	5th	49.5

=== Complete FIA World Endurance Championship results ===
(key) (Races in bold indicate pole position; races in italics indicate fastest lap)

Year	Entrant	Class	Chassis	Engine	1	2	3	4	5	6	7	8	Rank	Points
2019–20	Gulf Racing	LMGTE Am	Porsche 911 RSR	Porsche 4.0 L Flat-6	SIL; 4	FUJ; 8	SHA; 9	BHR; 3	COA; 6	SPA; 10	LMS; 5	BHR	13th	70
2021	D'station Racing	LMGTE Am	Aston Martin Vantage AMR	Aston Martin 4.0 L Turbo V8	SPA; 7	ALG; Ret	MNZ; 3	LMS; 5	BHR; 10	BHR; 7			9th	51

=== Complete IMSA SportsCar Championship results ===
(key) (Races in bold indicate pole position) (Races in italics indicate fastest lap)

Year	Team	Class	Make	Engine	1	2	3	4	5	6	7	8	9	10	11	Pos.	Points
2020	Aston Martin Racing	GTD	Aston Martin Vantage AMR GT3	Aston Martin 4.0 L Turbo V8	DAY; 17	DAY	SEB	ELK	VIR	ATL	MDO	CLT	PET	LGA	SEB	58th	14

=== Complete 24 Hours of Le Mans results ===
Year	Team	Co-Drivers	Car	Class	Laps	Pos.	Class Pos.
2020	(United Kingdom) Gulf Racing	(United Kingdom) Ben Barker (United Kingdom) Michael Wainwright	Porsche 911 RSR	GTE; Am	337	29th	5th
2021	(Japan) D'station Racing	(Japan) Tomonobu Fujii (Japan) Satoshi Hoshino	Aston Martin Vantage AMR	GTE; Am	333	33rd	6th

=== Complete European Le Mans Series results ===
(key) (Races in bold indicate pole position; results in italics indicate fastest lap)

Year	Entrant	Class	Chassis	Engine	1	2	3	4	5	Pos.	Points
2020	Gulf Racing UK	LMGTE	Porsche 911 RSR	Porsche 4.0 L Flat-6	LEC	SPA	LEC	MNZ	ALG; Ret	NC	0

=== Complete British Touring Car Championship results ===
(key) Races in bold indicate pole position (1 point awarded – 2002–2003 all races, 2004–present just in first race) Races in italics indicate fastest lap (1 point awarded all races) * signifies that driver lead race for at least one lap (1 point awarded – 2002 just in feature races, 2003–present all races)

Year	Team	Car	1	2	3	4	5	6	7	8	9	10	11	12	13	14	15	16	17	18	19	20	21	22	23	24	25	26	27	28	29	30	DC	Points
2023	CarStore Power Maxed Racing	Vauxhall Astra	DON; 1; 4	DON; 2; 21	DON; 3; 12	BRH; 1 Ret	BRH; 2; 20	BRH; 3; 23	SNE; 1; 18	SNE; 2; 18	SNE; 3; 18	THR; 1; 18	THR; 2; 16	THR; 3; 13	OUL; 1; 15	OUL; 2; 12	OUL; 3; 15	CRO; 1; 16	CRO; 2; 14	CRO; 3; 14	KNO; 1; 2	KNO; 2; 9	KNO; 3; 16	DON; 1; 9	DON; 2; 16	DON; 3; 11	SIL; 1; 3	SIL; 2; 6	SIL; 3; 18	BRH; 1; 14	BRH; 2; 18	BRH; 3; 18	15th	92
2024	Toyota Gazoo Racing UK	Toyota Corolla GR Sport	DON; 1; 10	DON; 2; 12	DON; 3; 12	BRH; 1; 8	BRH; 2; 15	BRH; 3; 7	SNE; 1; 5	SNE; 2; 6	SNE; 3; 16	THR; 1; 13	THR; 2 Ret	THR; 3; 12	OUL; 1; 14	OUL; 2; 10	OUL; 3; 14	CRO; 1; 12	CRO; 2; 12	CRO; 3 NC	KNO; 1; 11	KNO; 2; 14	KNO; 3 NC	DON; 1 Ret	DON; 2; 14	DON; 3; 12	SIL; 1; 9	SIL; 2; 15	SIL; 3; 14	BRH; 1; 10	BRH; 2; 11	BRH; 3; 8	14th	120

Sporting positions
Preceded by Bobby Thompson	Jack Sears Trophy; Winner; 2023	Succeeded by Mikey Doble
