= Jamie Chadwick =

British racing driver (born 1998)

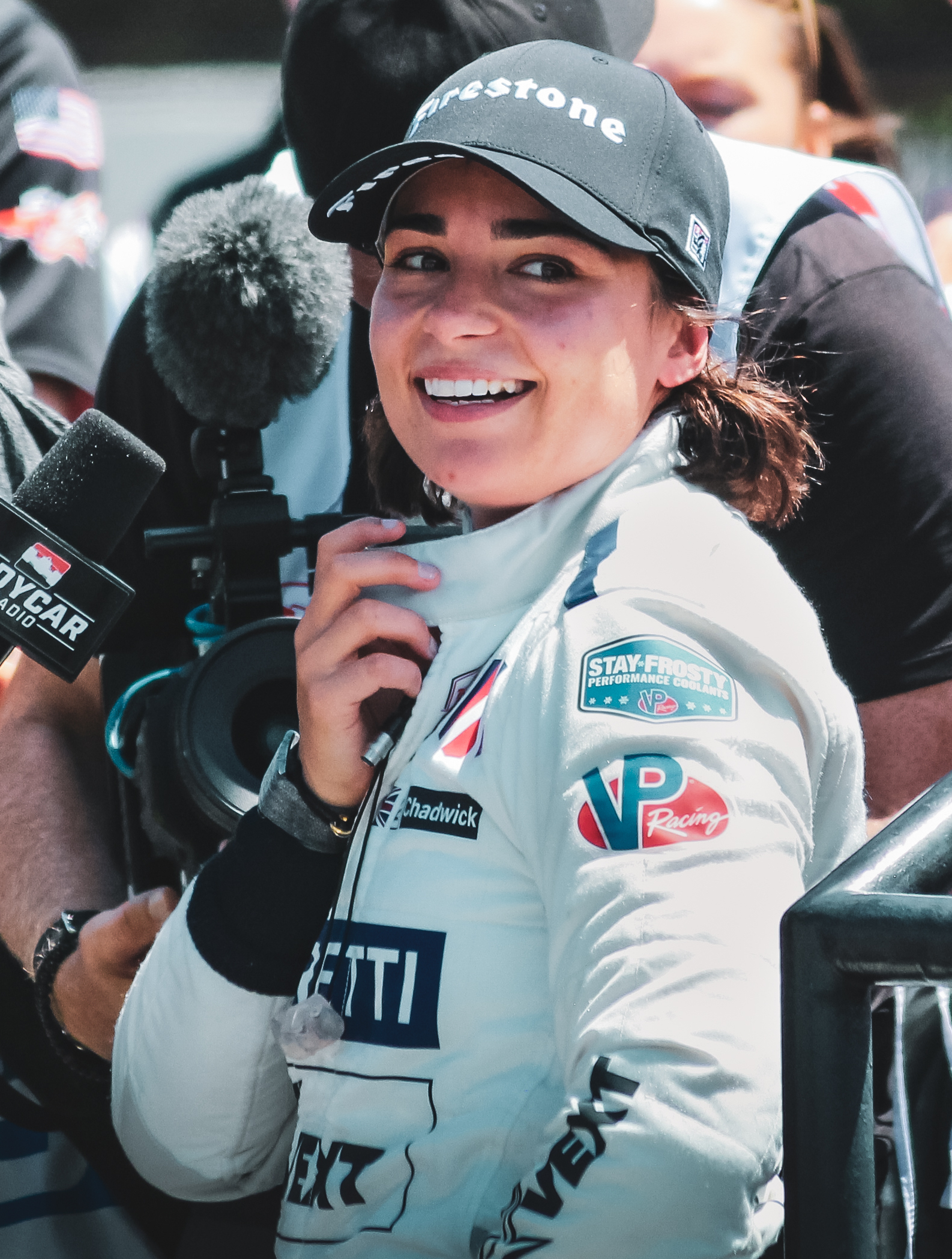
- Chadwick during Indy NXT campaign in 2024.
- Nationality: (United Kingdom) British
- Born: Jamie Laura Chadwick; 20 May 1998 (age 28) Bath, Somerset, England

European Le Mans Series career
- Debut season: 2025
- Current team: IDEC Sport
- Categorisation: FIA Silver
- Car number: 18
- Starts: 6 (6 entries)
- Championships: 0
- Wins: 3
- Podiums: 4
- Poles: 0
- Fastest laps: 0
- Best finish: 3rd in 2025

24 Hours of Le Mans career
- Years: 2025 –
- Teams: IDEC Sport
- Best finish: DNF (2025)
- Class wins: 0

Previous series
- 2023–24; 2019, 2021–22; 2021; 2020; 2019–20; 2018–19; 2017–18; 2015–16; 2013–14: Indy NXT; W Series; Extreme E; Formula Regional European; F3 Asian Championship; MRF Challenge Formula 2000; BRDC British Formula 3; British GT Championship – GT4; Ginetta Junior Championship

Championship titles
- 2019, 2021–22; 2018–19; 2015: W Series; MRF Challenge; British GT Championship – GT4

Jamie Laura Chadwick (born 20 May 1998) is a British racing driver who competes for IDEC Sport in the European Le Mans Series, and previously raced for Andretti Global in Indy NXT. She won the inaugural W Series season in 2019, before retaining her title in 2021 and 2022. She has also competed in the Race of Champions for Great Britain alongside David Coulthard, and raced in Extreme E. She is a Williams Racing ambassador and also a Williams Driver Academy adviser for F1 Academy. She also is a test driver for the Jaguar Formula E team.

== Personal life ==
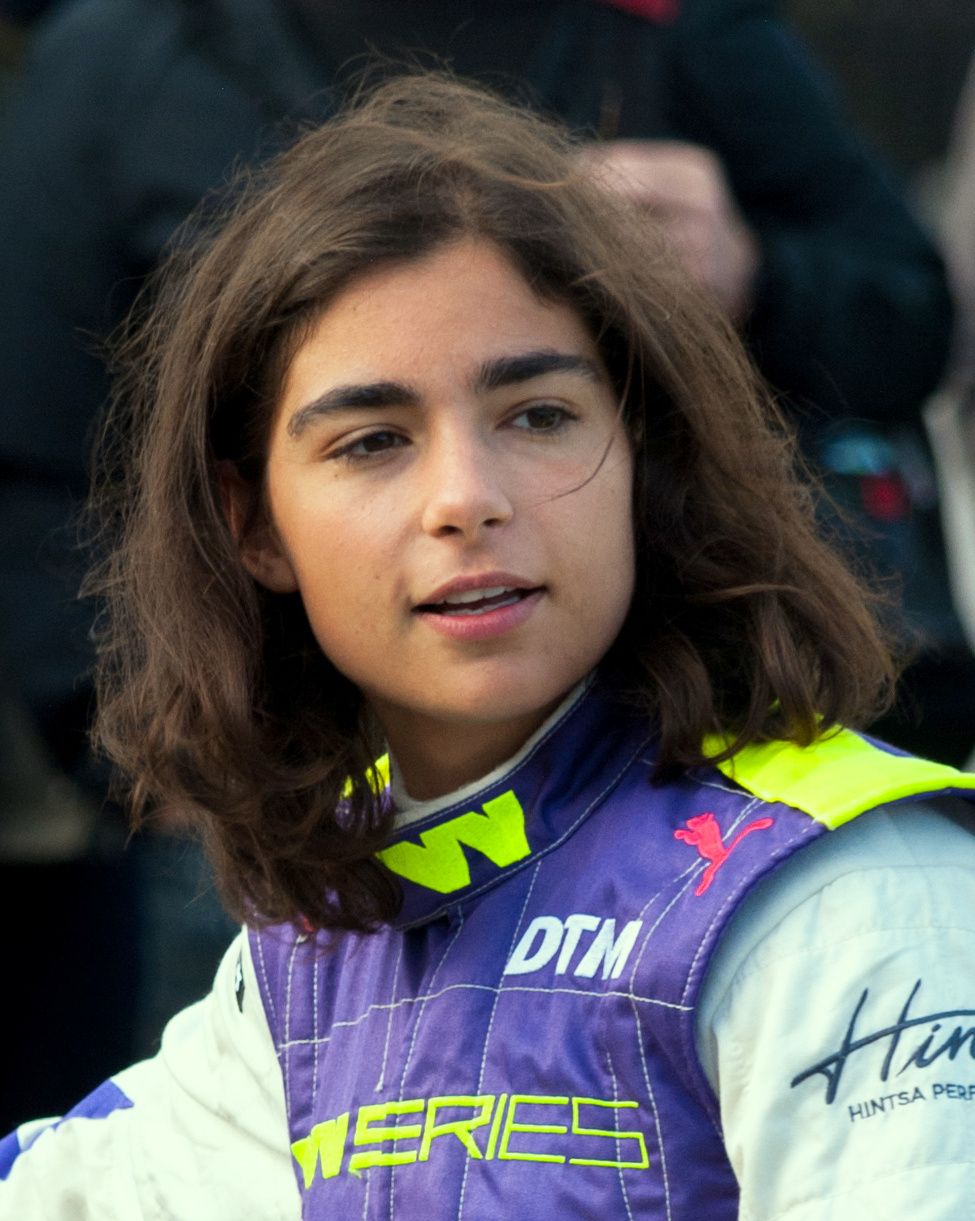
Chadwick in 2019

Chadwick was born on 20 May 1998 in Bath and grew up on the Isle of Man. Her father Michael is a property developer, and her mother Jasmine is an Indian-born businesswoman. Chadwick was educated at Cheltenham College, Gloucestershire. She currently resides in London and is in a relationship with racing driver Struan Moore.

== Career ==
=== Early career ===
Chadwick started her motorsports career in kart racing at the age of eleven, following her brother Oliver into the sport. She started car racing in 2013 when she turned down a trial with the England under-eighteen hockey team to compete at the Ginetta Junior scholarship weekend, where she triumphed to win a scholarship for the 2013 Ginetta Junior Championship season. Chadwick raced alongside her brother for the JHR Developments team, finishing tenth in the championship, second-last of all full-time competitors and behind her teammate and brother Oliver. She remained in the series for 2014, taking five podium finishes during the year to finish eighth overall in the championship.

In March 2015, Chadwick was announced as one of the drivers for Beechdean Motorsport in the 2015 British GT Championship, competing in the GT4 class. Chadwick and her co-driver, Ross Gunn, an Aston Martin factory driver, took two wins and five podiums during the season in their Aston Martin V8 Vantage, including a win in the Silverstone 24-Hour race. This made Chadwick the first female and youngest ever champion of the British GT Championship.

Going into 2016, Chadwick stayed in British GT Championship, driving in the GT4 pro class with Generation AMR SuperRacing for the first, second and sixth rounds, before returning to Beechdean Motorsport to race in the pro-am class with Paul Hollywood for the final three races of the season. Chadwick ultimately finished fifteenth in the championship.

Chadwick also competed in race 9 of the 2016 VLN season, driving the Nexcel AMR Aston Martin GT8 and finishing third in the SP8 class.

=== Transition to single-seater racing ===
Chadwick moved into single-seater racing in 2017, joining Double R Racing to compete in the 2017 BRDC British Formula 3 Championship. She achieved her first and only podium of the season with a third place finish at Rockingham in the fifth round of the championship, ultimately finishing ninth overall for the season. For the 2018 season, Chadwick remained in the BRDC British Formula 3 Championship, moving to Douglas Motorsport. In August, she became the first ever woman to win a British F3 race by claiming victory in the reversed-grid race at Brands Hatch, and finished the season in eighth place.

Chadwick also entered the 2018 24 Hours of Nürburgring, driving the Aston Martin Vantage V8 GT4 in the SP8 class alongside Jonathan Adam, Alex Lynn and Pete Cate. The team finished fifth in class and sixty-third overall.

Chadwick proceeded to sign on for the 2018–19 MRF Challenge season in November 2018, and topped both initial practice sessions. Chadwick had success in the early rounds of the championship, finishing second in three of the five races in the opening weekend in Dubai. She followed this up with wins in six of the remaining ten races at Bahrain and Chennai to take the title, becoming the first ever woman to win the MRF Challenge.

=== W Series ===
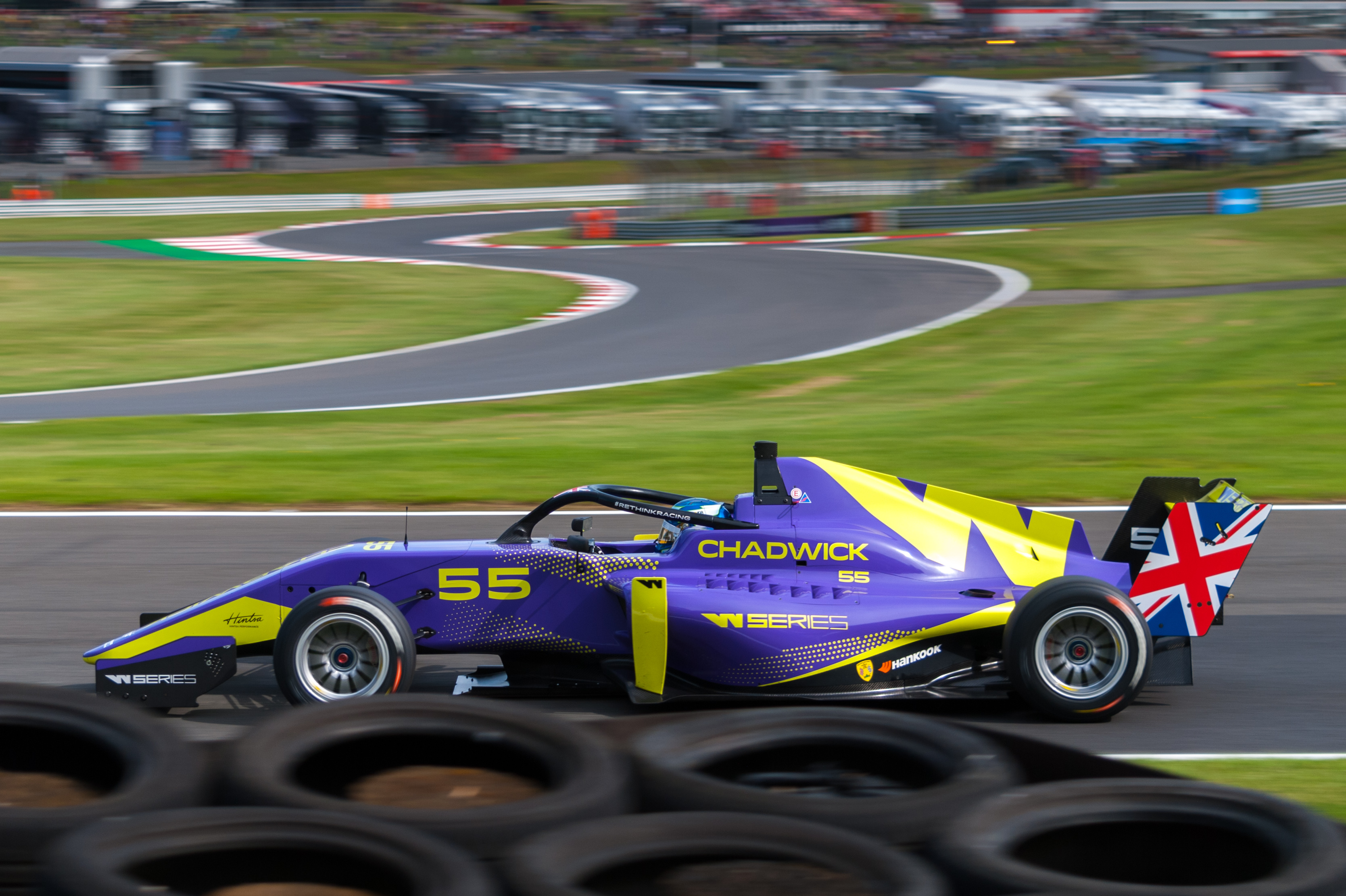
Chadwick at the 2019 W Series finale at Brands Hatch

In March 2019, Chadwick was announced as one of the entrants for the inaugural season of the W Series. Chadwick was also announced as an official junior driver for Aston Martin Racing, extending an existing unofficial relationship that dated back to 2014. At the first W Series race at Hockenheim, Chadwick put in a dominant performance, leading both practice sessions and qualifying on pole. Despite briefly giving up the race lead to Alice Powell, Chadwick came from behind to take the first win in W Series history. Two weeks later at Zolder, Chadwick again started on pole, however lost the lead to Beitske Visser from the start, and had to fight off Powell after locking up and running wide later in the race, ultimately holding onto second place.

In the next W Series race at Misano the following month, Chadwick qualified second behind Fabienne Wohlwend, but passed her on the start and held off pressure from Visser to take her second W Series win. Chadwick then finished in third place behind Marta García and Visser at Norisring, after a long battle with the latter that saw her lose second place on the start and make a late lunge in an attempt to regain the place towards the end of the race.

At Assen, Chadwick started and finished in third, holding off late pressure from Visser. In the non-championship reverse grid race the following day, Chadwick fought through the field to finish eighth after starting from the back of the grid. Chadwick entered the W Series championship decider at Brands Hatch with a 13 point lead on second placed Visser, and proceeded to start on pole for the third time. Despite defending the lead initially, she lacked race pace and lost positions to Powell, Emma Kimiläinen and finally Visser, however her eventual fourth placed finish was enough to hold off Visser and win the inaugural W Series title. She was then nominated for the 2019 BRDC Young Driver of the Year Award.

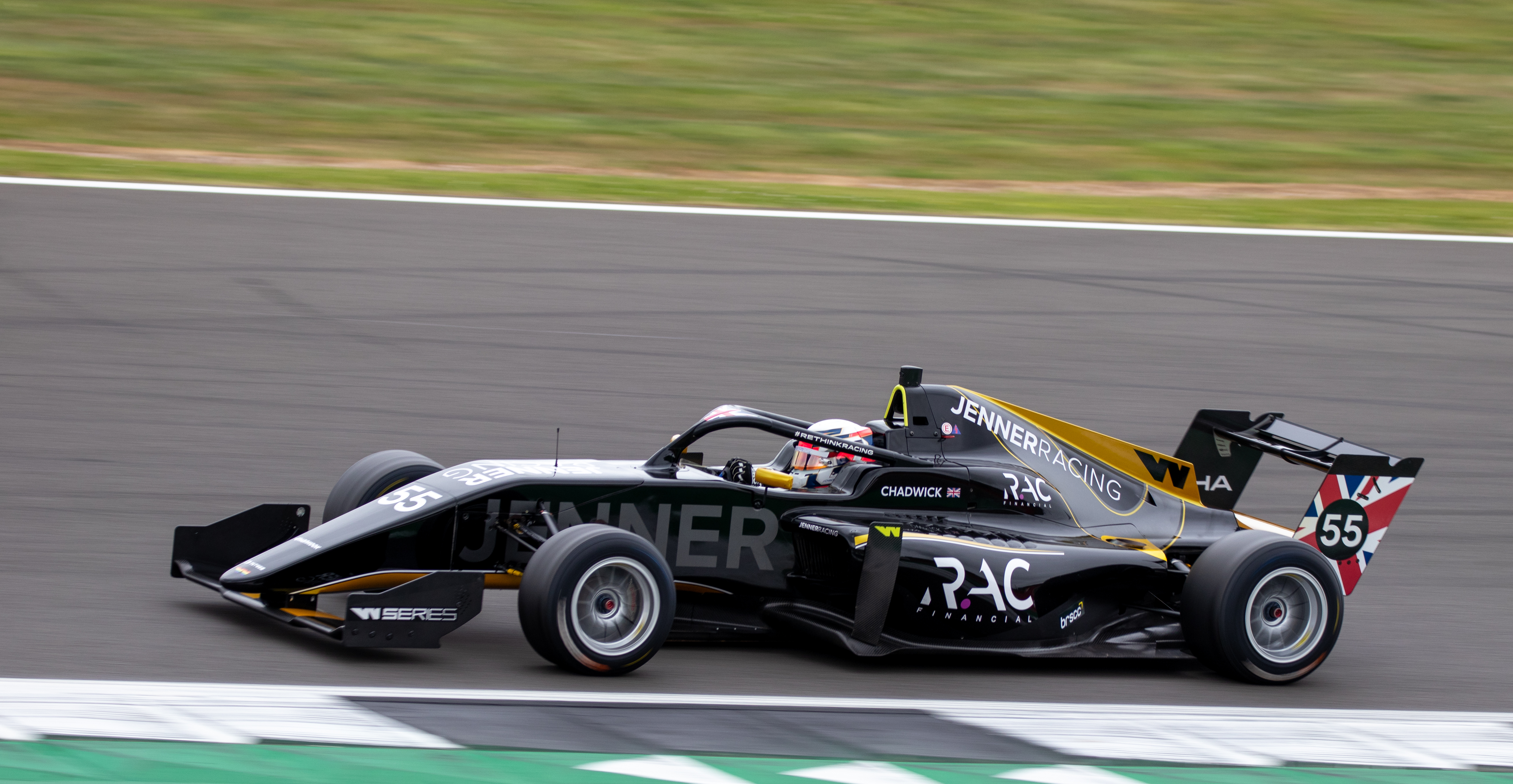
Chadwick won her fourth race of the season and sixth in a row at the Silverstone round of the 2022 W Series.

The 2020 W Series season was cancelled due to the COVID-19 pandemic. In 2021, Chadwick would retain her W Series title after a close, season-long battle with Alice Powell—thus adding fifteen points to her Super Licence points tally and making her available for future free practice sessions in Formula One.

On 22 February 2022, Chadwick was confirmed to stay in W Series for a third season, driving for Jenner Racing. She qualified on pole position for the second race of the 2022 season, which was part of the double header at the Miami International Autodrome, as the drivers' second best qualifying times set the grid for the second race. She won the first race, overtaking Emma Kimiläinen on the final lap. She won the second race the next day, as well as the one at the Circuit de Barcelona-Catalunya, meaning she had won five consecutive W Series races, four of which were in America. Following the early termination of the 2022 W Series championship for financial reasons, Chadwick was declared series champion for the third time, ahead of second-placed Beitske Visser. She was once again a finalist for the BRDC Young Driver of the Year Award.

=== Other racing series ===
Chadwick participated in the opening three races of the 2019 F3 Asian Championship, as preparation for the inaugural season of the W Series. She also entered the 2019 24 Hours of Nürburgring with Aston Martin, racing alongside Alex Brundle finishing first in the SP8T class and twenty-seventh overall.

In September 2019, Chadwick joined Double R Racing to test drive their Euroformula Open car in Silverstone, with a view towards a competitive drive in the series in the future.

In 2020, Chadwick was awarded her first ten of the forty points (25 points for free practice) needed to qualify for an FIA Super Licence, after finishing fourth overall in the 2019–20 F3 Asian Championship.

On 16 June 2020, it was announced that Chadwick had joined Italian outfit Prema Powerteam, to be one of the team's four drivers in the 2020 Formula Regional European Championship. Despite being the most experienced driver in the field, she only managed ninth in the standings, 263 points behind her nearest teammate and third-last of all drivers to complete the whole season.

Chadwick was one of the first drivers announced to compete in the inaugural season of Extreme E in 2021. She ended up running a partial campaign due to clashes with the W Series, taking part in three races with Veloce Racing. The team had to withdraw from the first race due to damage to the car, but placed second in the second round and sixth in the final round. Chadwick then drove the car in a shootout at the 2022 Goodwood Festival of Speed, partnering with Max Fewtrell.

=== Formula E ===
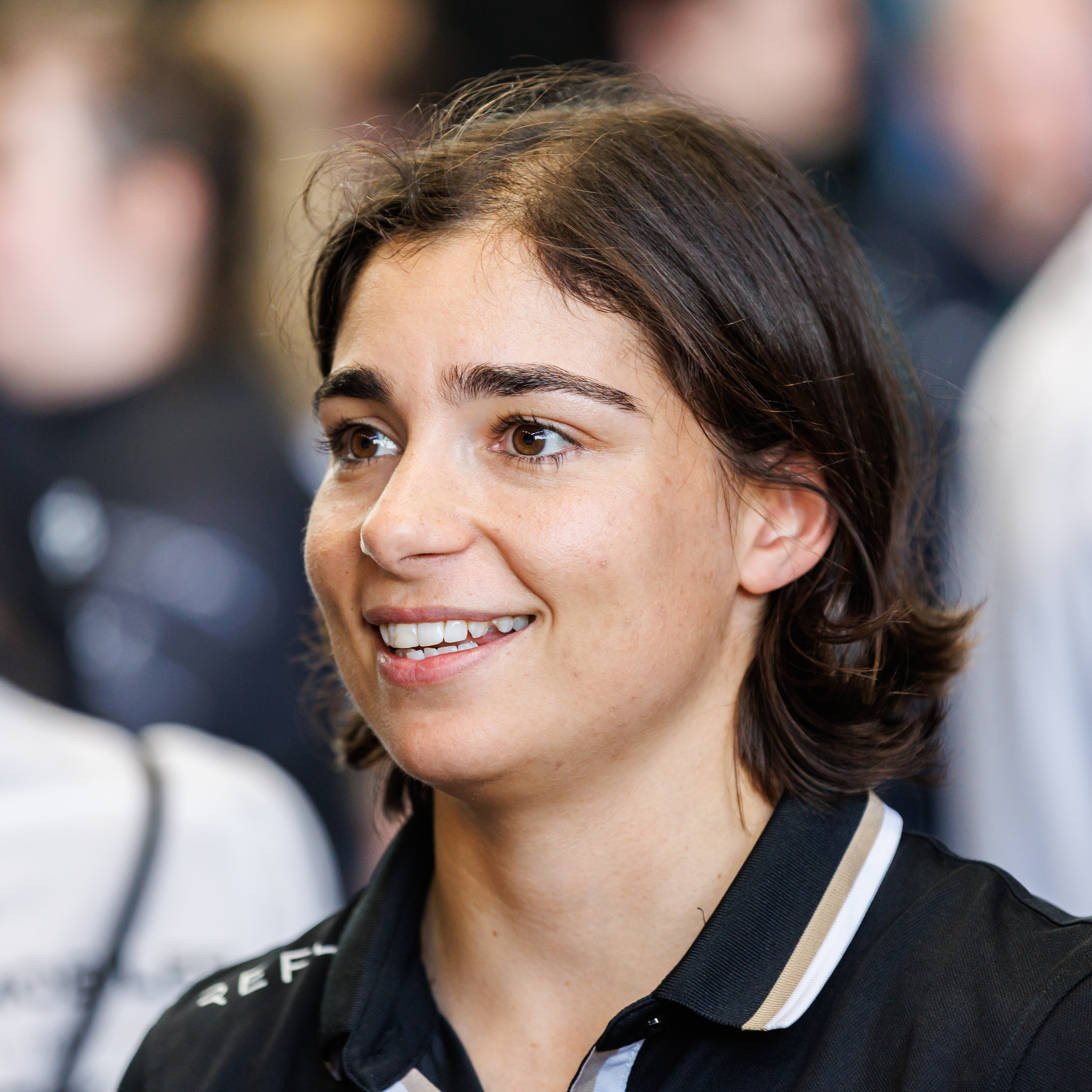
Chadwick with Jaguar in 2025

During the 2018–2019 Formula E season, Chadwick participated in two test drives with the NIO Formula E team, in Riyadh and Marrakesh. She then took part in the 2020 rookie test with Jaguar Racing.

Chadwick tested the Gen3 car at the 2024 Portland ePrix. On 28 October, Jaguar announced that she would drive with the team for the 2024–25 Formula E season women's test and rookie test. She placed second in the Women's test, behind Abbi Pulling. Chadwick tested for Jaguar once again for the rookie free practice coinciding the 2025 Jeddah ePrix, and once again during the Berlin rookie test alongside 2024 Formula 3 champion Leonardo Fornaroli. She returned with the team during the 2025–26 Formula E season women's test alongside Juju Noda.

=== Williams F1 ===
On 20 May 2019, Chadwick became the second driver to join the Williams Driver Academy, signing on as a development driver for the team. In March 2021, Williams announced that Chadwick would continue as a development driver for the season.

Chadwick remained with the Williams Driver Academy for 2023. She drove Keke Rosberg's FW08C at the 2023 Goodwood Festival of Speed, marking her first time in a Formula 1 car. In 2024, Chadwick's title changed to became a "Williams Racing Driver", as well as becoming the F1 Academy Advisor for fellow Williams driver Lia Block.

In February 2025, Chadwick was announced to remain with Williams as one of their driver ambassadors. She completed her first test in a modern Formula One car in September 2026, driving the 2025 season's Williams FW47 around the Algarve International Circuit over 32 laps.

=== Indy NXT ===
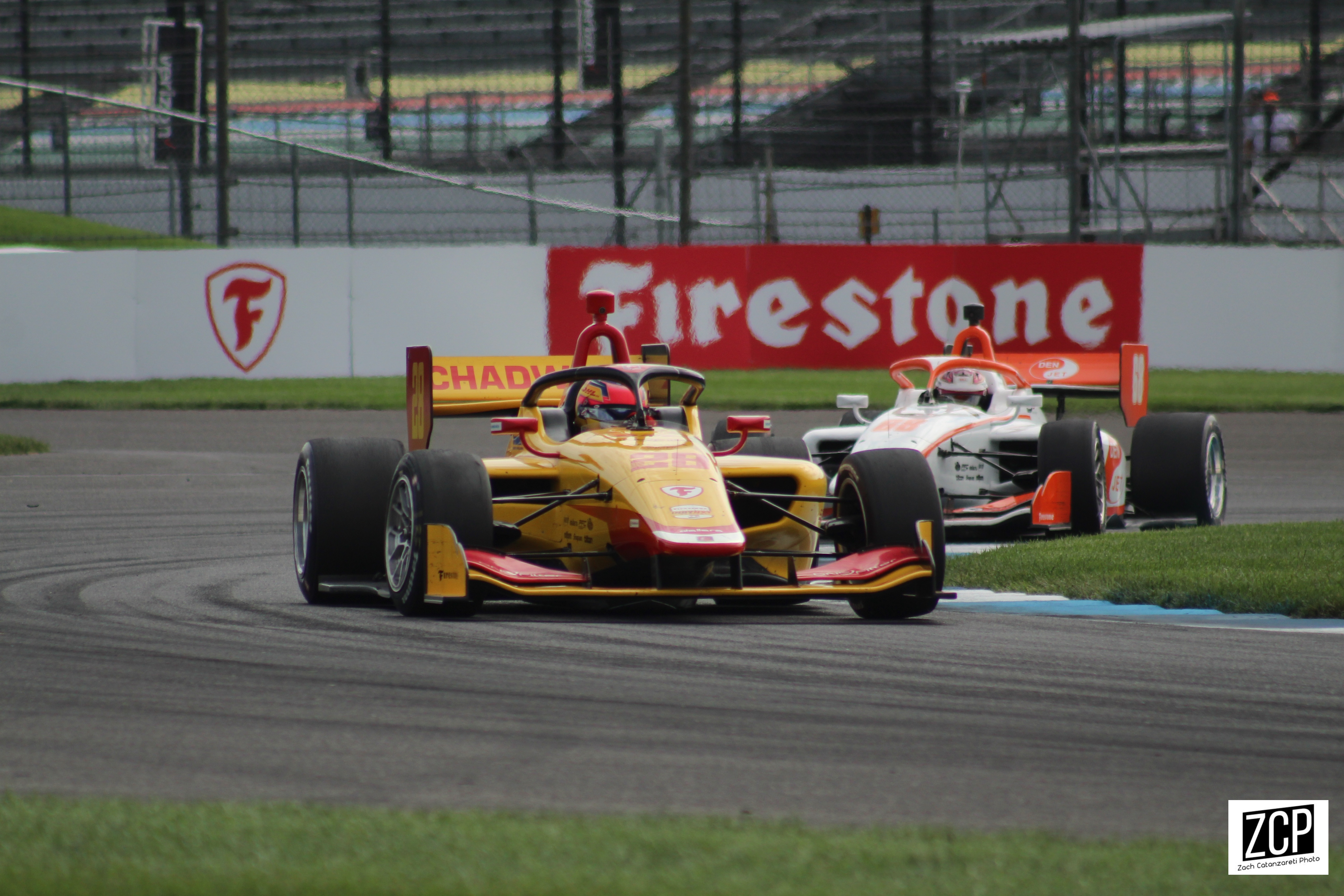
Chadwick finished sixth, her best of the 2023 season, at Portland International Raceway.

In August 2022, Andretti Autosport announced that they planned to test Chadwick in one of the team's Dallara IL-15 Indy Lights cars at Sebring International Raceway in September 2022. The test took place on 21 September and Chadwick covered over 120 laps of the circuit. Subsequently, it was announced on 1 December 2022 that Andretti Autosport had signed Chadwick to drive in the 2023 Indy NXT season. Inexperience with both the car and the tracks meant Chadwick struggled to get up to speed, but she improved in the second half of the season earning five top-ten finishes over the final eight races.

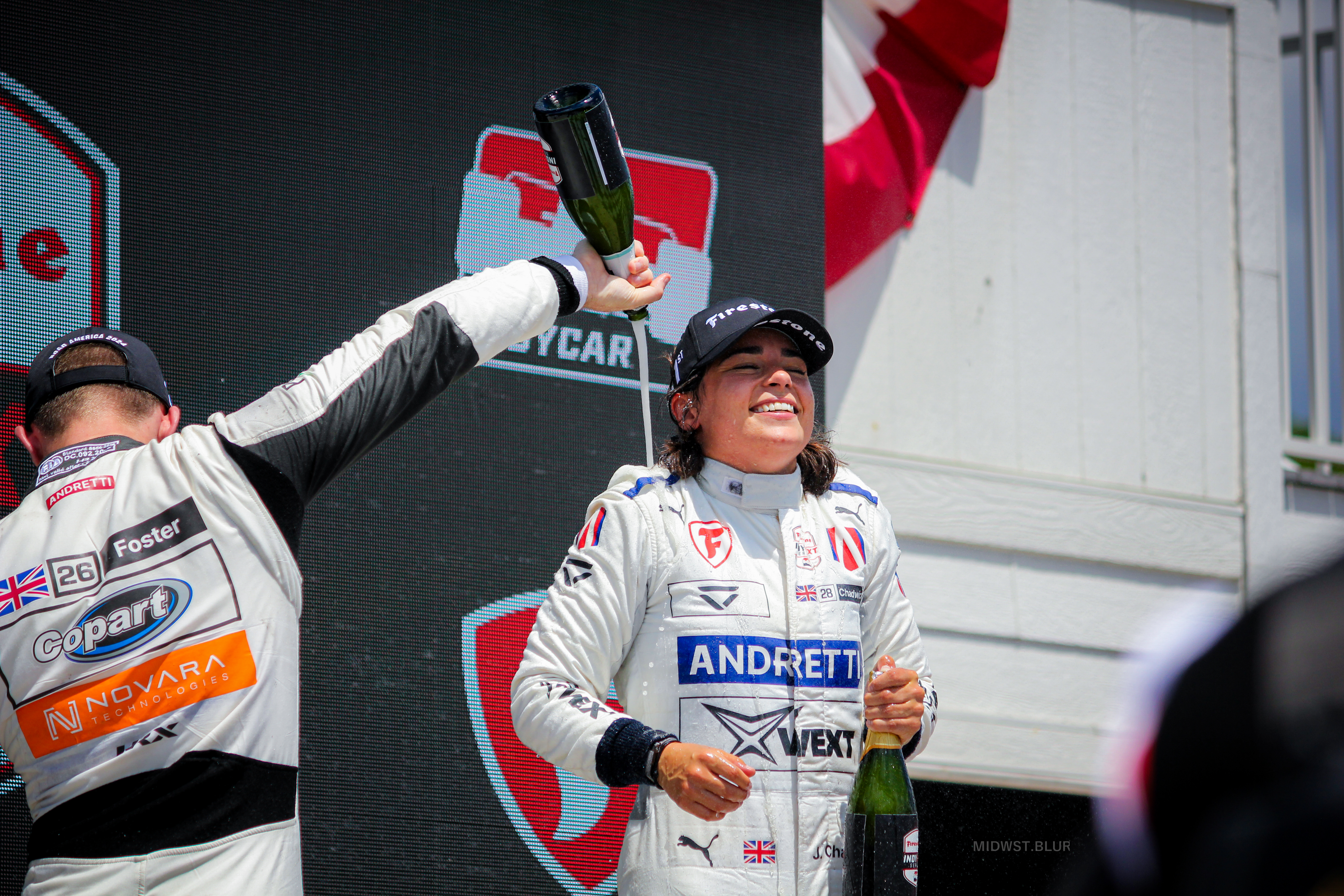
Chadwick on the podium at Road America after winning her first Indy NXT race.

In October 2023, it was announced that Chadwick would return to Andretti Global (formerly Andretti Autosport) for the 2024 Indy NXT season. She showed immediate improvement from the previous season, qualifying tenth for the first race and inside the top-six in the next four races. Chadwick fought in the front of the pack for the first races, but contact and mechanical issues meant she didn't achieve results representative of her pace. Chadwick scored her best result to date in race 3 at the Indianapolis Motor Speedway, finishing on the podium in third place. She became the first woman to finish on the podium in Indy NXT since Pippa Mann in 2010. In race 6 at Road America, she took a lights to flag victory, to convert her maiden pole position to a maiden win, becoming the first woman to win in Indy NXT/Indy Lights since Pippa Mann in 2010. She also became the first woman in series history to claim a road course pole and road course win.

On 31 July 2024, it was announced that Chadwick would be taking part in an official IndyCar test with Andretti Global at Barber Motosports Park on 30 September.

=== European Le Mans Series ===
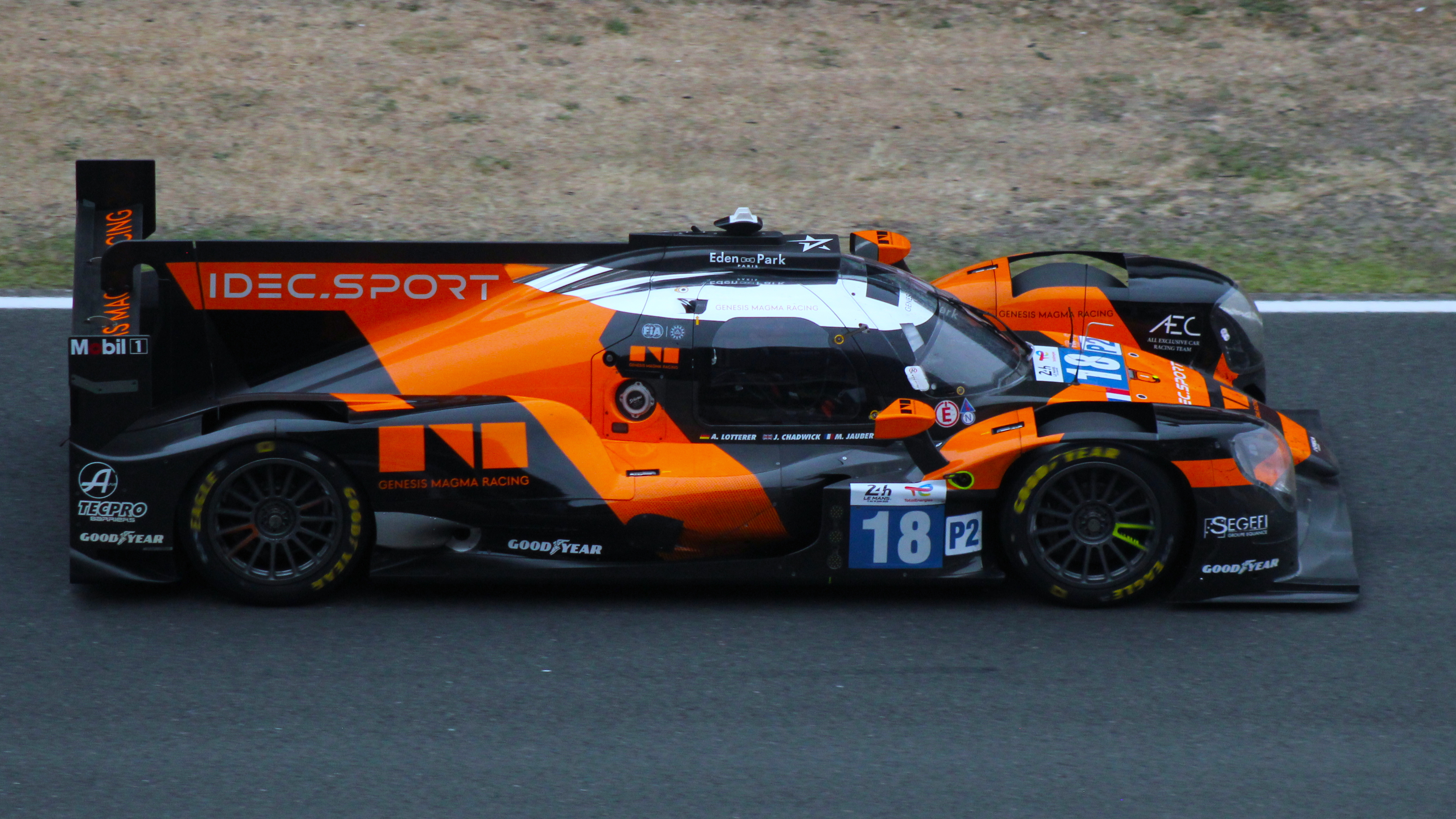
Chadwick's No. 18 car at the 2025 24 Hours of Le Mans

In December 2024, Chadwick signed with IDEC Sport for the 2025 European Le Mans Series, driving alongside Logan Sargeant and Mathys Jaubert. The team is run in collaboration with Genesis Magma Racing, as the latter prepares for a Le Mans Hypercar debut in the 2026 FIA World Endurance Championship. Sargeant later withdrew prior to the start of the season, and was replaced by Daniel Juncadella.

== Racing record ==
=== Career summary ===
Season	Series	Team	Races	Wins	Poles	F/Laps	Podiums	Points	Position
2013	Ginetta Junior Championship	JHR Developments	20	0	0	0	0	221	10th
2014	Ginetta Junior Championship	JHR Developments	20	0	0	0	5	287	8th
2015	British GT Championship – GT4	Beechdean-AMR	9	2	0	0	5	164.5	**1st**
2015	Silverstone 24 Hours	Beechdean-AMR	1	1	1	1	1	N/A	**1st**
2016	British GT Championship – GT4	Generation AMR SuperRacing	2	0	0	0	0	29	15th
2016	British GT Championship – GT4	Beechdean-AMR	4	0	0	0	0	29	15th
2017	BRDC British Formula 3 Championship	Double R Racing	24	0	0	0	1	264	9th
2018	BRDC British Formula 3 Championship	Douglas Motorsport	24	1	0	0	2	260	8th
2018	24 Hours of Nürburgring – SP8	AMR Performance Centre	1	0	0	0	0	N/A	5th
2018–19	MRF Challenge Formula 2000	MRF Racing	15	6	0	5	9	280	**1st**
2018–19	Formula E	NIO Formula E Team	Test driver						
2019	W Series	Hitech GP	6	2	3	0	5	110	**1st**
2019	F3 Asian Championship	Seven GP	3	0	0	0	0	18	14th
2019	Euroformula Open Championship	Double R	0	0	0	0	0	0	NC
2019	24 Hours of Nürburgring – SP8T	AMR Performance Centre	1	1	0	0	1	N/A	**1st**
2019–20	F3 Asian Championship	Absolute Racing	15	0	0	2	4	139	4th
2019–20	Formula E	Panasonic Jaguar Racing	Test driver						
2020	Formula Regional European Championship	Prema Powerteam	23	0	0	0	1	80	9th
2020	Formula One	Williams Racing	Development driver						
2021	W Series	Veloce Racing	8	4	4	3	7	159	**1st**
2021	Extreme E	Veloce Racing	2	0	0	0	1	48	10th
2021	Formula One	Williams Racing	Development driver						
2022	W Series	Jenner Racing	7	5	3	3	6	143	**1st**
2022	Formula One	Williams Racing	Development driver						
2023	Indy NXT	Andretti Autosport	14	0	0	0	0	262	12th
2023	Formula One	Williams Racing	Development driver						
2024	Indy NXT	Andretti Global	14	1	1	0	2	310	7th
2024	Formula One	Williams Racing	Development driver						
2024–25	Formula E	Jaguar TCS Racing	Test driver						
2025	European Le Mans Series – LMP2	IDEC Sport	6	3	0	0	4	90	**3rd**
2026	European Le Mans Series – LMP2	IDEC Sport	6	0	0	0	2	70	**3rd**
2026	FIA World Endurance Championship – Hypercar	Genesis Magma Racing	Reserve driver						

=== Complete Ginetta Junior Championship results ===
(key) (Races in bold indicate pole position in class) (Races in italics indicate fastest lap in class)

Year	Team	1	2	3	4	5	6	7	8	9	10	11	12	13	14	15	16	17	18	19	20	Pos	Pts
2013	JHR Developments	BHI; 1; 7	BHI; 2; 7	DON; 1; 6	DON; 2; 11	THR; 1 Ret	THR; 2; 13	OUL; 1; 7	OUL; 2; 9	CRO; 1 Ret	CRO; 2; 9	SNE; 1; 9	SNE; 2; 11	KNO; 1; 9	KNO; 2; 5	ROC; 1; 7	ROC; 2; 7	SIL; 1; 8	SIL; 2; 14	BHGP; 1; 7	BHGP; 2 Ret	10th	221
2014	JHR Developments	BHI; 1; 3	BHI; 2 Ret	DON; 1; 11	DON; 2 Ret	THR; 1; 3	THR; 2; 5	OUL; 1; 7	OUL; 2; 4	CRO; 1; 4	CRO; 2; 13	SNE; 1; 7	SNE; 2; 8	KNO; 1 Ret	KNO; 2; 3	ROC; 1; 3	ROC; 2; 6	SIL; 1; 3	SIL; 2 Ret	BHGP; 1; 10	BHGP; 2 Ret	8th	287

=== Complete British GT Championship results ===
(key) (Races in bold indicate pole position in class) (Races in italics indicate fastest lap in class)

Year	Team	Car	Class	1	2	3	4	5	6	7	8	9	Pos	Pts
2015	Beechdean-AMR	Aston Martin V8 Vantage GT4	GT4	OUL; 1; 12	OUL; 2 DSQ	ROC; 1; 11	SIL; 1; 11	SPA; 1; 15	BRH; 1; 13	SNE; 1; 18	SNE; 2; 17	DON; 1 EX	1st	164.5
2016	Generation AMR SuperRacing	Aston Martin V8 Vantage GT4	GT4	BRH; 1; 13	ROC; 1; 20	OUL; 1	OUL; 2	SIL; 1					15th	29
2016	Beechdean-AMR	Aston Martin V8 Vantage GT4	GT4						SPA; 1; 28	SNE; 1; 23	SNE; 2; 20	DON; 1; 20	15th	29

=== Silverstone 24 Hour results ===
Year	Team	Co-drivers	Car	Car no.	Class	Laps	Pos.	Class pos.
2015	(United Kingdom) Beechdean AMR	(United Kingdom) Andrew Howard; (United Kingdom) Jonathan Adam; (United Kingdom) Harry Whale; (United Kingdom) Ross Gunn	Aston Martin V8 Vantage GT4	35	3	529	**1st**	**1st**

=== Complete BRDC British Formula 3 Championship results ===
(key) (Races in bold indicate pole position) (Races in italics indicate fastest lap)

Year	Team	1	2	3	4	5	6	7	8	9	10	11	12	13	14	15	16	17	18	19	20	21	22	23	24	Pos	Points
2017	Double R Racing	OUL; 1; 11	OUL; 2 DSQ	OUL; 3 Ret	ROC; 1; 8	ROC; 2; 3	ROC; 3; 11	SNE1; 1; 7	SNE1; 2; 7	SNE1; 3; 12	SIL; 1; 9	SIL; 2; 10	SIL; 3; 15	SPA; 1; 6	SPA; 2; 10	SPA; 3; 11	BRH; 1; 11	BRH; 2; 5	BRH; 3; 15	SNE2; 1; 9	SNE2; 2; 7	SNE2; 3; 11	DON; 1; 9	DON; 2; 11	DON; 3; 7	9th	264
2018	Douglas Motorsport	OUL; 1; 8	OUL; 2; 3^{6}	OUL; 3; 7	ROC; 1; 9	ROC; 2; 10	ROC; 3 Ret	SNE; 1; 13	SNE; 2; 13	SNE; 3; 7	SIL1; 1; 5	SIL1; 2; 9^{4}	SIL1; 3; 13	SPA; 1; 12	SPA; 2; 5^{2}	SPA; 3; 12	BRH; 1; 12	BRH; 2; 1^{3}	BRH; 3; 11	DON; 1; 10	DON; 2; 12	DON; 3; 4	SIL2; 1; 9	SIL2; 2; 8	SIL2; 3 C	8th	260

=== Complete MRF Challenge Formula 2000 Championship results ===
(key) (Races in bold indicate pole position) (Races in italics indicate fastest lap)

Year	1	2	3	4	5	6	7	8	9	10	11	12	13	14	15	Pos	Points
2018–19	DUB; 1; 2	DUB; 2; 4	DUB; 3; 2	DUB; 4; 5	DUB; 5; 2	BHR; 1; 4	BHR; 2; 1	BHR; 3; 4	BHR; 4; 1	BHR; 5; 1	CHE; 1; 5	CHE; 2; 1	CHE; 3; 5	CHE; 4; 1	CHE; 5; 1	1st	280

=== Complete F3 Asian Championship results ===
(key) (Races in bold indicate pole position) (Races in italics indicate fastest lap)

Year	Team	1	2	3	4	5	6	7	8	9	10	11	12	13	14	15	Pos	Points
2019	Seven GP	SEP; 1; 6	SEP; 2; 12	SEP; 3; 5	CHA; 1	CHA; 2	CHA; 3	SUZ; 1	SUZ; 2	SUZ; 3	SIC1; 1	SIC1; 2	SIC1; 3	SIC2; 1	SIC2; 2	SIC2; 3	14th	18
2019–20	Absolute Racing	SEP1; 1; 7	SEP1; 2; 10	SEP1; 3; 8	DUB; 1; 6	DUB; 2; 11	DUB; 3; 8	ABU; 1; 9	ABU; 2; 8	ABU; 3; 9	SEP2; 1; 3	SEP2; 2; 4	SEP2; 3; 6	CHA; 1; 2	CHA; 2; 2	CHA; 3; 3	4th	139

=== Complete W Series results ===
(key) (Races in bold indicate pole position) (Races in italics indicate fastest lap)

Year	Team	1	2	3	4	5	6	7	8	DC	Points
2019	Hitech GP	**HOC**; 1	**ZOL**; 2	MIS; 1	NOR; 3	ASS; 3	**BRH**; 4			1st	110
2021	Veloce Racing	RBR; 6	**RBR**; 1	SIL; 3	**HUN**; 1	**SPA**; 2	ZAN; 2	COA; 1	**COA**; 1	1st	159
2022	Jenner Racing	MIA; 1	**MIA**; 1	**CAT**; 1	**SIL**; 1	LEC; 1	HUN; 2	SIN; Ret		1st	143

=== Complete Formula Regional European Championship results ===
(key) (Races in bold indicate pole position) (Races in italics indicate fastest lap)

Year	Team	1	2	3	4	5	6	7	8	9	10	11	12	13	14	15	16	17	18	19	20	21	22	23	24	Pos	Points
2020	Prema Powerteam	MIS; 1; 3	MIS; 2; 8	MIS; 3; 6	LEC; 1; 10	LEC; 2; 10^{†}	LEC; 3; 9	RBR; 1 Ret	RBR; 2; 10	RBR; 3; 5	MUG; 1; 9	MUG; 2; 7	MUG; 3; 8	MNZ; 1; 10	MNZ; 2 Ret	MNZ; 3; 8	CAT; 1; 10	CAT; 2; 9	CAT; 3; 10	IMO; 1 Ret	IMO; 2; 9	IMO; 3; 10	VLL; 1; 8	VLL; 2 C	VLL; 3; 7	9th	80

^{†} Driver did not finish the race, but was classified as they completed more than 90% of the race distance.

=== Complete Extreme E results ===
(key)

Year	Team	Car	1	2	3	4	5	6	7	8	9	10	Pos.	Points
2021	Veloce Racing	Spark ODYSSEY 21	DES; Q 9	DES; R WD	OCE; Q 5	OCE; R 2	ARC; Q	ARC; R	ISL; Q	ISL; R	JUR; Q 6	JUR; R 6	10th	48

=== American open-wheel racing results ===
==== Indy NXT ====
(key) (Races in bold indicate pole position) (Races in italics indicate fastest lap) (Races with ^{L} indicate a race lap led) (Races with * indicate most race laps led)

Year	Team	1	2	3	4	5	6	7	8	9	10	11	12	13	14	Rank	Points
2023	Andretti Autosport	STP; 13	ALA; 11	IMS1; 15	DET1; 11	DET2; 16	RDA; 15	MOH; 10	IOW; 10	NSH; 8	IMS2; 10	GMP; 12	POR; 6	LAG1; 15	LAG2; 12	12th	262
2024	Andretti Global	STP; 20	ALA; 20	IMS1; 3	IMS2; 16	DET; 12	**RDA**; 1*	LAG1; 9	LAG2; 6	MOH; 10	IOW; 7	GMP; 16	POR; 14	MIL; 5	NSH; 17	7th	310

=== Complete European Le Mans Series results ===
(key) (Races in bold indicate pole position; results in italics indicate fastest lap)

Year	Entrant	Class	Chassis	Engine	1	2	3	4	5	6	Rank	Points
2025	IDEC Sport	LMP2	Oreca 07	Gibson GK428 4.2 L V8	CAT; 1	LEC; 1	IMO; 11	SPA; 11	SIL; 1	ALG; 3	**3rd**	**90**
2026	IDEC Sport	LMP2	Oreca 07	Gibson GK428 4.2 L V8	CAT; 4	LEC; 4	IMO; 4	**SPA**; 3	SIL; 11	ALG; 2	3rd	70

=== Complete 24 Hours of Le Mans results ===
Year	Team	Co-Drivers	Car	Class	Laps	Pos.	Class Pos.
2025	(France) IDEC Sport	(France) Mathys Jaubert (Germany) André Lotterer	Oreca 07-Gibson	LMP2	206	DNF	DNF

Sporting positions
Preceded by Ross Wylie; Jake Giddings	British GT Championship; GT4 Champion; 2015; With: Ross Gunn	Succeeded by Graham Johnson; Mike Robinson
Preceded by Felipe Drugovich	MRF Challenge Formula 2000; Champion; 2018–19	Succeeded by Michelangelo Amendola
Preceded by Inaugural	W Series; Champion; 2019–2022	Succeeded by None (Series ended)
