= 2015 Silverstone 24 Hours =

Motor-racing competition

Map of the Silverstone Grand Prix Circuit

The 2015 Britcar 24 Hour Race Silverstone was the 10th running of the Silverstone 24 Hours endurance sports car race held on April 25–26, 2015 at the Silverstone Circuit.

Victory overall and in Class 3 went to the No. 35 Beechdean AMR Aston Martin V8 Vantage driven by Andrew Howard, Jonathan Adam, Harry Whale, Jamie Chadwick, and Ross Gunn. Victory in Class 4 went to the No. 50 St. Bas Koeten Racing SEAT León Cup Racer driven by Karel Gijs Bessem, Harry Hilders, and Roger Grouwels. Class 1 was won by the No. 10 Radical Sportscars Radical RXC V8 driven by Laurence Wiltshire, Shahin Nouri, Martyn Smith, and Richard Roberts. Class 5 was won by the No. 62 Red Camel-jordan.nl SEAT Leon driven by Ivo Breukers, Rik Breukers, and Sjaco Griffioen. Finally, Class 2 went to the No. 91 MARC Cars Australia MARC Focus GTC driven by Tom Onslow-Cole, Paul White, Ben Gersekowski, and Garry Jacobson.

== Race results ==
Class winners in bold.

Pos	Class	No	Team	Drivers	Car	Laps
1	**Class 3**	**35**	**(United Kingdom) Beechdean AMR**	**(United Kingdom) Andrew Howard (United Kingdom) Jonathan Adam (United Kingdom) Harry Whale (United Kingdom) Jamie Chadwick (United Kingdom) Ross Gunn**	**Aston Martin V8 Vantage GT4**	**529**
2	**Class 4**	**50**	**(Netherlands) St. Bas Koeten Racing**	**(Netherlands) Karel Gijs Bessem (Netherlands) Harry Hilders (Netherlands) Roger Grouwels**	**SEAT León Cup Racer**	**524**
3	Class 3	37	(Netherlands) Cor Euser Racing	(United States) Hal Prewitt (United States) Jim Briody (United Kingdom) Alistair MacKinnon (Germany) Dirk Schulz (United Kingdom) Sam Allpass	Lotus Evora Cup GT4	519
4	Class 3	41	(United Kingdom) Speedworks Motorsport	(United Kingdom) Tony Hughes (United Kingdom) Ollie Hancock (United Kingdom) Devon Modell (United Kingdom) John Gilbert	Aston Martin V8 Vantage GT4	515
5	Class 3	36	(United States) Andrew Palmer	(United States) Andrew Palmer (United Kingdom) Marek Reichman (United Kingdom) Alice Powell (United Kingdom) Andrew Frankel	Aston Martin V8 Vantage GT4	506
6 DNF	Class 4	33	(United Kingdom) Nick Barrow	(United Kingdom) Nick Barrow (United Kingdom) Tom Barrow (United Kingdom) Clint Bardwell (United Kingdom) Richard Corbett	BMW 135 GTR	495
7	**Class 1**	**10**	**(United Kingdom) Radical Sportscars**	**(United Kingdom) Laurence Wiltshire (Switzerland) Shahin Nouri (United Kingdom) Martyn Smith (United Kingdom) Richard Roberts**	**Radical RXC V8**	**492**
8	**Class 5**	**62**	**(Netherlands) Red Camel-jordans.nl**	**(Netherlands) Ivo Breukers (Netherlands) Rik Breukers (Netherlands) Sjaco Griffioen**	**SEAT Leon**	**491**
9	**Class 2**	**91**	**MARC Cars Australia**	**(United Kingdom) Tom Onslow-Cole (United Kingdom) Paul White (Australia) Ben Gersekowski (Australia) Garry Jacobson**	**MARC Focus GTC**	**487**
10	Class 4	58	(United Kingdom) WEC Motorsport	(United Kingdom) Dave Cox (United Kingdom) Jason Cox (United Kingdom) Michael Cox (United Kingdom) George Haynes	BMW M3	485
11	Class 2	17	(United Kingdom) Topcats Racing	(United Kingdom) Nigel Pike (United Kingdom) Paul Black (Germany) Joachim Bölting (United Kingdom) Pat Gormley	Marcos Mantis	464
12	Class 4	59	(United Kingdom) Team Chf500	(United Kingdom) Ben Demetriou (United Kingdom) Jonathan Evans (United Kingdom) Alex Eacock (United Kingdom) Paul Follett	Porsche 968	459
13	Class 1	12	(United Kingdom) Team LNT	(United Kingdom) Chris Hoy (United Kingdom) Lawrence Tomlinson (United Kingdom) Mike Simpson (United Kingdom) Charlie Robertson (France) Gaetan Paletou	Ginetta-Juno P3-15	418
14	Class 5	65	(United Kingdom) Paul Mensley	(United Kingdom) Paul Mensley (United Kingdom) Nick Boon (United Kingdom) James Ashton (United Kingdom) Mike Nash (United Kingdom) Paul Anderton	Ford Fiesta	394
15 DNF	Class 1	8	(United Kingdom) Peter Cook	(United Kingdom) Philip Hopkins (France) Franck Pelle (United Kingdom) Peter Cook (United Kingdom) Adam Sharpe (United Kingdom) Stephen Ritchie	Audi R8 LMS	389
16 DNF	Class 4	61	(United Kingdom) JR Motorsport	(Netherlands) Eric van de Munckhof (Netherlands) Martin Lanting (United Kingdom) Steve Liquorish (United Kingdom) Mark Jaffray	BMW M3 E46	378
17 NC	Class 2	15	(United Kingdom) Topcats Racing	(United Kingdom) Paul Stephens (United Kingdom) Gerry Taylor (Republic of Ireland) Owen O'Neill (United Kingdom) Neil Huggins	Marcos Mantis	377
18 DNF	Class 2	92	Team Russia by Barwell	(Russia) Timur Sardarov (United Kingdom) James Kaye (Russia) Leo Machitski (United Kingdom) Mark Lemmer	MARC Focus GTC	372
19 NC	Class 5	66	(United Kingdom) WEC Motorsport	(United Kingdom) Gavin Spencer (United Kingdom) Frank Pettit (United Kingdom) Carey Lewis (United Kingdom) Andy Ruthven	SEAT Leon Supercopa	333
20 DNF	Class 3	38	(United Kingdom) Darron Anley	(United Kingdom) Darron Anley (United Kingdom) David Joseph (United Kingdom) Mark Abbot	Chevron GR8	322
21 DNF	Class 3	34	(United Kingdom) Alex Osborne	(United Kingdom) Alex Osborne (United Kingdom) James May (United States) Paul May	Porsche 997 GT4 Cup	274
22 DNF	Class 1	4	(United Kingdom) Witt Gamski	(United Kingdom) Witt Gamski (United Kingdom) Phil Dryburgh (United Kingdom) Joe Macari (United Kingdom) Rory Butcher	Ferrari F430 GTC	247
23 DNF	Class 4	60	(United Kingdom) Sicl.com	(United Kingdom) Ashley Woodman (United Kingdom) Rob Cullum (United Kingdom) Martin Byford (United Kingdom) Jon Cullum	SEAT Leon Cup Racer	227
24 DNF	Class 1	14	(Germany) Marco Shelp	(Germany) Marco Shelp (Germany) Michael Tischner (United Kingdom) Willie Moore (United Kingdom) Jim Geddie (United Kingdom) Glynn Geddie	Porsche 997 GT3 Cup	221
25 DNF	Class 2	43	(United Kingdom) Ian Carvell	(United Kingdom) Ian Carvell (United Kingdom) Rob Carvell (United Kingdom) Dave Carvell (United Kingdom) Tom Witts	Jaguar XF-S	157
26 DNF	Class 4	53	(United Kingdom) Mike Moss	(United Kingdom) Mike Moss (United Kingdom) Robert Gilham (United Kingdom) John Clonis (United Kingdom) Graham Cox (United Kingdom) Tom Howard	BMW M3 GT4	81
27 DNF	Class 1	76	(United Kingdom) Simon Green	(United Kingdom) Nigel Rata (United Kingdom) Freddie Hunt (United Kingdom) Simon Green	Jaguar XKR-S	38
28 DNF	Class 3	88	(United Kingdom) Rollcentre Racing	(United Kingdom) Martin Short (United Kingdom) Massimiliano Girardo (United Kingdom) Richard Neary (United Kingdom) James Cottingham	BMW M3 E46	8
DNS	Class 2	16	(United Kingdom) John Stack	(United Kingdom) John Stack (United Kingdom) Alan Brown (United Kingdom) Rory Brown	Ferrari F430 Challenge	0
DNS	Class 1	7	(United Kingdom) ISL	(United Kingdom) Alun Edwards (United Kingdom) Gerry Hampshire	Tampolli SR2 RTA-2001	0
