= Will Palmer =

British racing driver

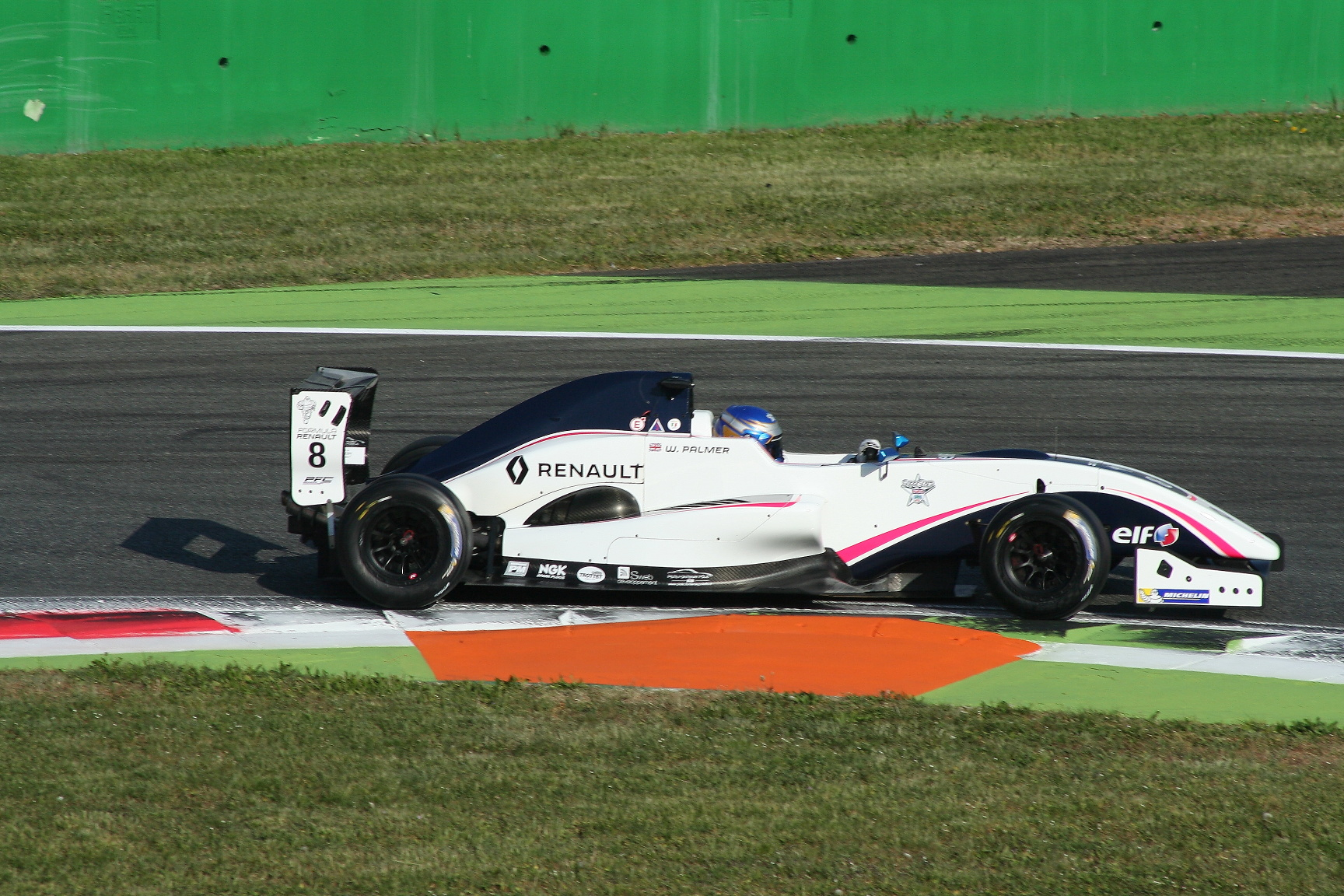
- Born: 15 February 1997 (age 29); Horsham, United Kingdom
- Relatives: Jonathan Palmer (father); Jolyon Palmer (brother)

Eurocup Formula Renault 2.0 career
- Debut season: 2015
- Current team: R-ace GP
- Car number: 8
- Starts: 41
- Wins: 4
- Poles: 1
- Fastest laps: 2
- Best finish: 2nd in 2017

Previous series
- 2018 2016-2017 2014-2016 2013-2014 2011-2013 2011-2012: GP3 Series; Formula Renault 2.0 NEC; BRDC Formula 4 Championship; BRDC F4 Winter Championship; Ginetta Junior Championship; Ginetta Junior Winter Series

Championship titles
- 2015 2014: BRDC Formula 4 Championship; BRDC F4 Winter Championship

Awards
- 2015: McLaren Autosport BRDC Award

William Palmer (born 15 February 1997) is a British former racing driver. He is the son of Jonathan Palmer and brother of Jolyon Palmer. He is a past winner of the McLaren Autosport BRDC Award.

Palmer won the BRDC F4 Championship in 2015 having previously won the 2014 BRDC Formula 4 Winter Championship.

== Career ==
=== Ginetta Juniors (2011-2013) ===
A successful 2013 season saw Palmer finish third in the 2013 Ginetta Junior Championship.

=== BRDC Formula 4 (2013-2015) ===
Palmer competed in the BRDC Formula 4 Winter Championship in 2013, ahead of graduating to the category for 2014. A promising debut full season in BRDC F4 saw Palmer take two wins and finish sixth in the 2014 overall standings. He followed that up by winning the F4 Winter Championship, taking four wins from eight races. He was nominated for the McLaren Autosport BRDC Award and he was named the winner at the Autosport Awards.

=== 2015 McLaren Autosport BRDC Award ===
After his record-breaking BRDC F4 season, Palmer was nominated for the 2015 McLaren Autosport BRDC Award alongside Jack Aitken, Ben Barnicoat, Jake Hughes, Ricky Collard and Toby Sowery. After two days of assessments at Silverstone, Palmer was named the winner at the Autosport Awards in London, receiving the prize of £100,000, a McLaren F1 test, Arai Carbon helmet and BRDC membership.

After the end of the 2016 season, Palmer received his McLaren F1 test for winning the 2015 McLaren Autosport BRDC Award, impressing the team throughout with McLaren simulator test engineer Alice Rowlands commenting that Palmer should be "very happy" with his maiden run in a Grand Prix car. "It's not easy," she added, "he doesn't know anyone and it's a step up from anything he's done before, working with this many engineers. Looking at the data it was clearly someone driving a Formula 1 car properly - not someone that was out for a little afternoon drive around."

=== Formula Renault 2.0 (2016-17) ===
For 2016, Palmer graduated to race in Europe and competed in both the Eurocup Formula Renault 2.0 championship and Formula Renault 2.0 Northern European Cup for the R-ace GP team. He scored five podium finishes over the course of the season and claimed his maiden victory in European racing as he took the chequered flag in the penultimate race of the Eurocup season at Estoril in Portugal.

In December 2016, it was announced that Palmer would continue with R-ace GP for the 2017 championships. He finished as runner-up to Sacha Fenestraz with wins at Silverstone, Monza and Monaco and another seven podiums.

=== GP3 Series ===
In April 2018, Palmer signed with MP Motorsport for the final season of the sport. He only made one round as he retired from racing in June 2018 to focus on his studies and his work.

== Racing record ==
=== Career summary ===
Season	Series	Team	Races	Wins	Poles	F/Laps	Podiums	Points	Position
2011	Ginetta Junior Championship	Hillspeed	6	0	0	0	0	46	18th
2011	Ginetta Junior Winter Series	Hillspeed	4	0	0	0	0	0	NC
2012	Ginetta Junior Championship	HHC Motorsport	18	0	0	0	0	170	12th
2012	Ginetta Junior Winter Series	HHC Motorsport	3	0	0	0	1	70	**3rd**
2013	Ginetta Junior Championship	HHC Motorsport	20	1	4	3	10	406	**3rd**
2013	BRDC Formula 4 Winter Championship	HHC Motorsport	8	1	1	0	2	131	5th
2014	BRDC Formula 4 Championship	HHC Motorsport	24	2	0	3	7	356	6th
2014	BRDC Formula 4 Winter Championship	HHC Motorsport	8	4	0	7	7	239	**1st**
2015	BRDC Formula 4 Championship	HHC Motorsport	24	12	10	14	15	592	**1st**
2015	Eurocup Formula Renault 2.0	ART Junior Team	3	0	0	0	0	0	NC†
2016	Eurocup Formula Renault 2.0	R-ace GP	15	1	0	1	2	76	7th
2016	Formula Renault 2.0 NEC	R-ace GP	12	0	0	0	3	126	13th
2016	BRDC British Formula 3 Championship	HHC Motorsport	3	0	1	1	1	39	25th
2017	Formula Renault Eurocup	R-ace GP	23	3	1	1	10	298	**2nd**
2017	Formula Renault NEC	R-ace GP	3	0	0	0	1	0	NC†
2018	GP3 Series	MP Motorsport	2	0	0	0	0	0	25th

^{†} As Palmer was a guest driver, he was ineligible for points.

=== Complete Eurocup Formula Renault 2.0 results ===
(key) (Races in bold indicate pole position; races in italics indicate fastest lap)

Year	Entrant	1	2	3	4	5	6	7	8	9	10	11	12	13	14	15	16	17	18	19	20	21	22	23	DC	Points
2015	ART Junior Team	ALC; 1	ALC; 2	ALC; 3	SPA; 1	SPA; 2	HUN; 1	HUN; 2	SIL; 1; 10	SIL; 2; 13	SIL; 3; 9	NÜR; 1	NÜR; 2	LMS; 1	LMS; 2	JER; 1	JER; 2	JER; 3							NC†	0
2016	R-ace GP	ALC; 1; 13	ALC; 2; 6	ALC; 3; 20	MON; 1; 9	MNZ; 1; 6	MNZ; 2 Ret	MNZ; 3; 7	RBR; 1 Ret	RBR; 2; 6	LEC; 1; 3	LEC; 2; 10	SPA; 1 Ret	SPA; 2; 9	EST; 1; 1	EST; 2; 22									7th	76
2017	R-ace GP	MNZ; 1; 4	MNZ; 2; 1	SIL; 1; 1	SIL; 2; 2	PAU; 1; 4	PAU; 2; 4	**MON**; **1**; 1	MON; 2; 3	HUN; 1; 18	HUN; 2; 2	HUN; 3; 4	NÜR; 1; 8	NÜR; 2; 5	RBR; 1; 12	RBR; 2; 2	LEC; 1; 3	LEC; 2; 4	SPA; 1; 9	SPA; 2; 6	SPA; 3; 2	CAT; 1; 2	CAT; 2; 6	CAT; 3; 4	2nd	298

† As Palmer was a guest driver, he was ineligible for points

=== Complete Formula Renault 2.0 NEC results ===
(key) (Races in bold indicate pole position) (Races in italics indicate fastest lap)

Year	Entrant	1	2	3	4	5	6	7	8	9	10	11	12	13	14	15	DC	Points
2016	R-ace GP	MNZ; 1; 13	MNZ; 2; 3	SIL; 1; 3	SIL; 2; 2	HUN; 1; 9	HUN; 2; 18	SPA; 1 DNS	SPA; 2 Ret	ASS; 1; 11	ASS; 2; 6	NÜR; 1	NÜR; 2	HOC; 1; 16	HOC; 2; 12	HOC; 3; 21	12th	126
2017	R-ace GP	MNZ; 1	MNZ; 2	ASS; 1	ASS; 2	NÜR; 1	NÜR; 2	SPA; 1; 9	SPA; 2; 6	SPA; 3; 2	HOC; 1	HOC; 2					NC†	0

† As Palmer was a guest driver, he was ineligible for points

=== Complete GP3 Series results ===
(key) (Races in bold indicate pole position) (Races in italics indicate fastest lap)

Year	Entrant	1	2	3	4	5	6	7	8	9	10	11	12	13	14	15	16	17	18	Pos	Points
2018	MP Motorsport	CAT; FEA; 18	CAT; SPR; 13	LEC; FEA	LEC; SPR	RBR; FEA	RBR; SPR	SIL; FEA	SIL; SPR	HUN; FEA	HUN; SPR	SPA; FEA	SPA; SPR	MNZ; FEA	MNZ; SPR	SOC; FEA	SOC; SPR	YMC; FEA	YMC; SPR	25th	0

Sporting positions
Preceded by Matthew Graham	BRDC Formula 4 Winter Championship champion 2014	Succeeded by Ben Barnicoat (Autumn Trophy)
Preceded by George Russell	BRDC Formula 4 Championship champion 2015	Succeeded by Matheus Leist (British F3 Championship)
Awards
Preceded by George Russell	McLaren Autosport BRDC Award; 2015	Succeeded by Lando Norris
