= Keith Donegan =

Irish racing driver

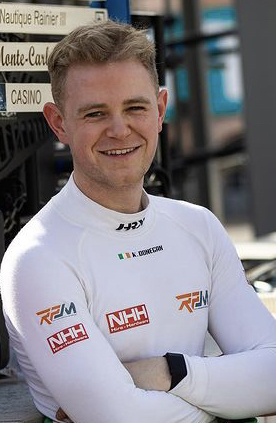
- Donegan in Monaco in 2022.
- Nationality: (Republic of Ireland) Irish
- Born: 12 March 1997 (age 29) Navan, Ireland

Formula Regional European Championship career
- Debut season: 2022
- Current team: Race Performance Motorsport
- Car number: 65
- Starts: 9 (10 entries)
- Wins: 0
- Podiums: 0
- Poles: 0
- Fastest laps: 0
- Best finish: 30th in in 2022

Previous series
- 2018 2018, 2017 2013, 2012: U.S. F2000 National Championship; Formula Ford; Ginetta Junior Championship

Awards
- 2018: Mazda Road to Indy Shootout

Keith Donegan (born 12 March 1997), is an Irish former racing driver and team owner who last drove in the 2022 Formula Regional European Championship for Race Performance Motorsport. He is the owner of the team, having purchased the assets of RP Motorsport in February 2022. Following Round 5 of the championship, Donegan stepped back from driving to continue as just the owner.

== Racing career ==
=== Karting ===
Donegan grew up in Navan, Ireland. He started karting at the age of nine, and did two years of karting in his home country of Ireland, and two years in the UK.

=== Ginetta Junior Championship ===
Donegan made his car racing debut in the 2012 Ginetta Junior Championship, driving for Beacon Racing in rounds 1-5 and 8-10, and driving for Hillspeed in rounds 6 and 7. With one podium, he finished eighth in the standings.

Donegan joined Douglas Motorsport for the 2013 season. With four wins and 12 podiums, he finished as the runner up in the championship.

=== Formula Ford ===
After a three year sabbatical to focus on his education, Donegan returned to racing in 2017, racing in various Formula Ford events such as the 2017 Formula Ford Festival, where he finished second. He competed again in the Formula Ford Festival in 2018.

=== U.S. F2000 Championship ===
In December 2017, Donegan won the Mazda Road to Indy Shootout up against the likes of Liam Lawson, giving him $200,000 to race in the 2018 U.S. F2000 National Championship. Driving with Arms Up Motorsports, he finished ninth in the standings with one podium.

=== Formula Regional European Championship ===
Prior to Round 1, Donegan joined the grid of the 2022 Formula Regional European Championship, racing alongside Pietro Delli Guanti at his own team, Race Performance Motorsport. He revealed in an interview in mid-2022 that the decision to compete in the championship was "very last minute" and that he "wasn’t prepared and was well over the weight limit".

Following Round 5, Donegan withdrew from a driving role within the team, replacing himself with Owen Tangavelou.

== Personal life ==
After the 2013 Ginetta Junior Championship, Donegan took a three year sabbatical from racing to study business at Trinity College Dublin. He had a deal with his mother that if he got certain grades, his parents would buy him a Formula Ford. He achieved the required grades, hence his return to motorsport in Formula Ford in 2017.

== Race Performance Motorsport ==
(Italy) Race Performance Motorsport
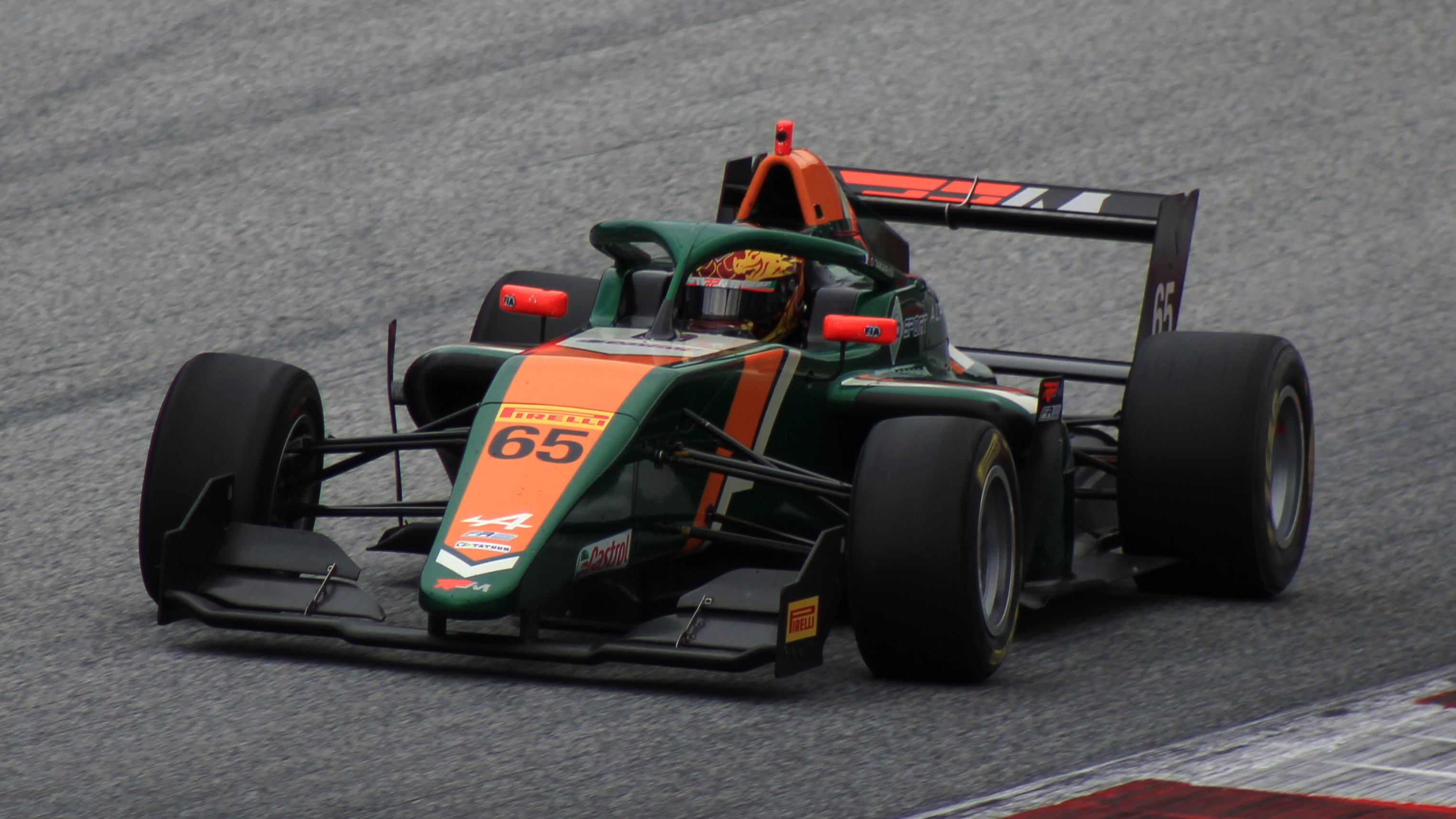
- Founded: 2022
- Founder(s): Keith Donegan
- Base: Piacenza, Italy
- Team principal(s): Enrico Carraro
- Current series: Formula Regional European Championship
- Current drivers: Formula Regional European Championship (Italy) Giovanni Maschio (Netherlands) Reno Francot (Belgium) Ean Eyckmans

In February 2022, Donegan purchased the assets of RP Motorsport to start his own team, Race Performance Motorsport (RPM). The team is registered in Italy, and based in Piacenza, like its predecessor. With an aim to compete in the Formula Regional European Championship, he took on Enrico Carraro as team manager, and the team made their competition debut in the 2022 Formula Regional European Championship, when they took the place of DR Formula. They competed with Donegan and Pietro Delli Guanti.

In an interview on 16 May 2022, Donegan revealed intentions for the team to field a third car in the Formula Regional European Championship before the end of the 2022 season.

For Round 6 at the Hungaroring, the team fielded Andrea Rosso in the third car to be kept for the remainder of the season, and Owen Tangavelou replaced Donegan as the driver in the second car.

For the 2023 season, the team signed Macéo Capietto, Adam Fitzgerald and Santiago Ramos.

== Racing record ==
=== Karting career summary ===
Season	Series	Position
2009	Super 1 National Comer Cadet Championship	34th
2011	Kartmasters British Grand Prix - Rotax Mini Max	9th

=== Racing career summary ===
Season	Series	Team	Races	Wins	Poles	F/Laps	Podiums	Points	Position
2012	Ginetta Junior Championship	Beacon Racing	16	0	0	0	1	274	8th
2012	Ginetta Junior Championship	Hillspeed	4	0	0	0	0	274	8th
2013	Ginetta Junior Championship	Douglas Motorsport	20	4	0	2	12	475	**2nd**
2017	National Formula Ford 1600 Championship - Pro	Privateer	12	0	0	2	2	N/A	NC†
2017	Formula Ford 1600 Scotland	Privateer	3	0	0	0	0	0	13th
2017	Formula Ford Festival	Privateer	1	0	0	1	1	N/A	**2nd**
2017	Formula Ford 1600 - Walter Hayes Trophy	Privateer	1	0	0	0	0	N/A	16th
2017	Mazda Road to Indy Shootout	Lucas Oil School of Racing	1	0	0	0	0	-	**1st**
2018	Formula Ford Festival	Privateer	1	0	0	0	0	N/A	6th
2018	U.S. F2000 Championship	Arms Up Motorsport	5	0	0	0	0	139	9th
2018	U.S. F2000 Championship	BN Racing	7	0	0	0	1	139	9th
2022	Formula Regional European Championship	Race Performance Motorsport	9	0	0	0	0	0	30th

^{†} As Donegan was a guest driver, he was ineligible for championship points.
^{*} Season still in progress.

==== U.S. F2000 Championship ====
Year	Team	1	2	3	4	5	6	7	8	9	10	11	12	13	14	Rank	Points
2018	ArmsUp Motorsports	STP; 14	STP; 13	IMS; 24	IMS; 11	LOR; 6										9th	139
2018	BN Racing						ROA; 3	ROA; 13	TOR; 5	TOR; 17	MOH; 4	MOH; 21	MOH; 4	POR	POR	9th	139

=== Complete Formula Regional European Championship results ===
(key) (Races in bold indicate pole position) (Races in italics indicate fastest lap)

Year	Team	1	2	3	4	5	6	7	8	9	10	11	12	13	14	15	16	17	18	19	20	DC	Points
2022	RPM	MNZ; 1; 31†	MNZ; 2; 16	IMO; 1; 25	IMO; 2; 25	MCO; 1; 20	MCO; 2 DNQ	LEC; 1; 27	LEC; 2; 18	ZAN; 1 Ret	ZAN; 2; 29	HUN; 1	HUN; 2	SPA; 1	SPA; 2	RBR; 1	RBR; 2	CAT; 1	CAT; 2	MUG; 1	MUG; 2	30th	0
