= 2013 Ginetta Junior Championship =

The 2013 Ginetta Junior Championship was a multi-event, one-make motor racing championship held across England and Scotland. The championship featured a mix of professional motor racing teams and privately funded drivers, aged between 14 and 17, competing in Ginetta G40s that conformed to the technical regulations for the championship. It forms part of the extensive program of support categories built up around the British Touring Car Championship centrepiece.

This season was the seventh Ginetta Junior Championship. The season commenced on 31 March 2013 at Brands Hatch – on the circuit's Indy configuration – and concluded on 13 October 2013 at the same venue, utilising the Grand Prix circuit, after twenty races held at ten meetings, all in support of the 2013 British Touring Car Championship.

== Regulation changes ==
After introducing slick racing tyres in 2012, the championship reverted to treaded road tyres from this season onwards. The switch back was made in effort to cut costs, by saving 75% on the tyre budget.

== Teams and drivers ==
Team	No.	Drivers	Rounds
HHC Motorsport	6	(United Kingdom) Harry Woodhead	1–9
HHC Motorsport	11	(United Kingdom) Will Palmer	All
HHC Motorsport	13	(United Kingdom) James Kellett	All
Junior Race Car Academy	10	(United Kingdom) Tom Jackson	All
Junior Race Car Academy	41	(United Kingdom) William Taylforth	8–10
Junior Race Car Academy	42	(United Kingdom) Jonathan Hadfield	8–10
Junior Race Car Academy	44	(United Kingdom) Ryan Hadfield	All
Junior Race Car Academy	17	(United Kingdom) Josh White	8–10
Hillspeed	17	(United Kingdom) Josh White	1–6
Tollbar Racing	18	(United Kingdom) Tom Brown	8–10
Privateer	19	(United Kingdom) Jack Mitchell	All
Privateer	46	(United Kingdom) Jack Rawles	All
Privateer	63	(United Kingdom) James Webb	9–10
Privateer	77	(United Kingdom) Ben Pearson	4–10
Douglas Motorsport	30	(Republic of Ireland) Keith Donegan	All
JHR Developments	33	(United Kingdom) Ollie Chadwick	All
JHR Developments	55	(United Kingdom) Jamie Chadwick	All
Border Reivers	72	(United Kingdom) Elliot Paterson	1–2
Border Reivers	77	(United Kingdom) Ben Pearson	1–3
Meridian Motorsport	82	(United Kingdom) Connor Mills	1–3

== Race calendar and results ==
The provisional calendar was announced by the British Touring Car Championship organisers on 29 August 2012.

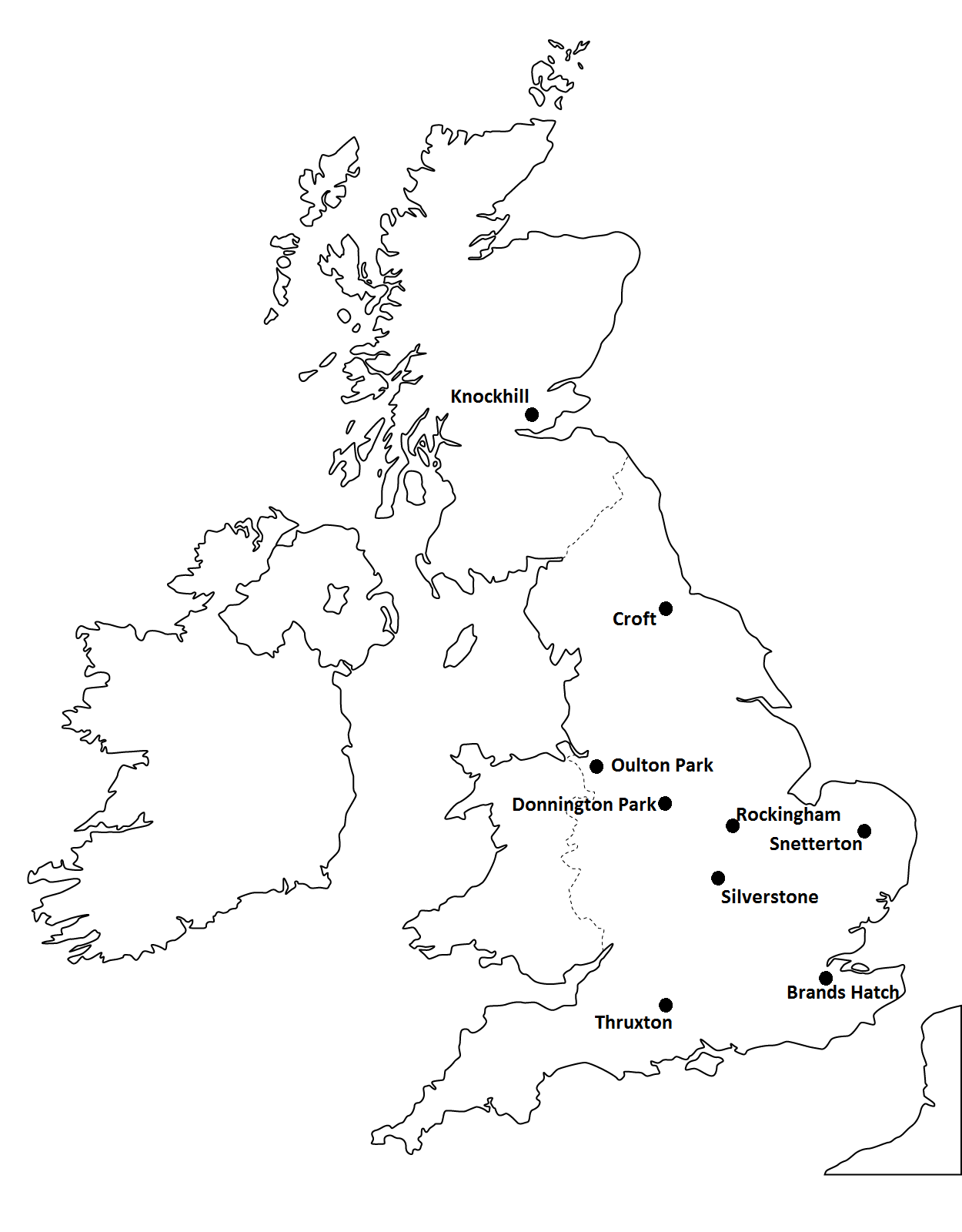
Circuits for the 2013 season

Round		Circuit	Date	Pole position	Fastest lap	Winning driver	Winning team
1	R1	Brands Hatch (Indy Circuit, Kent)	30 March	(United Kingdom) Harry Woodhead	(United Kingdom) James Kellett	(United Kingdom) Harry Woodhead	HHC Motorsport
1	R2	Brands Hatch (Indy Circuit, Kent)	31 March	(United Kingdom) Harry Woodhead	(United Kingdom) Harry Woodhead	(United Kingdom) Harry Woodhead	HHC Motorsport
2	R3	Donington Park (National Circuit, Leicestershire)	20 April	(United Kingdom) Harry Woodhead	(United Kingdom) Harry Woodhead	(United Kingdom) Harry Woodhead	HHC Motorsport
2	R4	Donington Park (National Circuit, Leicestershire)	21 April	(United Kingdom) Harry Woodhead	(United Kingdom) Ollie Chadwick	(United Kingdom) Harry Woodhead	HHC Motorsport
3	R5	Thruxton Circuit (Hampshire)	5 May	(United Kingdom) Will Palmer	(United Kingdom) Harry Woodhead	(United Kingdom) Harry Woodhead	HHC Motorsport
3	R6	Thruxton Circuit (Hampshire)	5 May	(United Kingdom) Harry Woodhead	(United Kingdom) Will Palmer	(United Kingdom) Harry Woodhead	HHC Motorsport
4	R7	Oulton Park (Island Circuit, Cheshire)	8 June	(United Kingdom) Harry Woodhead	(United Kingdom) Harry Woodhead	(United Kingdom) Harry Woodhead	HHC Motorsport
4	R8	Oulton Park (Island Circuit, Cheshire)	9 June	(United Kingdom) Harry Woodhead	(United Kingdom) Harry Woodhead	(United Kingdom) Harry Woodhead	HHC Motorsport
5	R9	Croft Circuit (North Yorkshire)	23 June	(United Kingdom) Harry Woodhead	(United Kingdom) Harry Woodhead	(United Kingdom) Harry Woodhead	HHC Motorsport
5	R10	Croft Circuit (North Yorkshire)	23 June	(United Kingdom) Harry Woodhead	(Republic of Ireland) Keith Donegan	(United Kingdom) Harry Woodhead	HHC Motorsport
6	R11	Snetterton Motor Racing Circuit (300 Circuit, Norfolk)	3 August	(United Kingdom) Will Palmer	(Republic of Ireland) Keith Donegan	(Republic of Ireland) Keith Donegan	Douglas Motorsport
6	R12	Snetterton Motor Racing Circuit (300 Circuit, Norfolk)	4 August	(United Kingdom) Will Palmer	(United Kingdom) Jack Mitchell	(United Kingdom) Jack Mitchell	Privateer
7	R13	Knockhill Racing Circuit (Fife)	24 August	(United Kingdom) Harry Woodhead	(United Kingdom) Tom Jackson	(Republic of Ireland) Keith Donegan	Douglas Motorsport
7	R14	Knockhill Racing Circuit (Fife)	25 August	(United Kingdom) Harry Woodhead	(United Kingdom) Harry Woodhead	(United Kingdom) Harry Woodhead	HHC Motorsport
8	R15	Rockingham Motor Speedway (International Super Sports Car Circuit, Northamptonshire)	14 September	(United Kingdom) James Kellett	(United Kingdom) Jack Mitchell	(United Kingdom) James Kellett	HHC Motorsport
8	R16	Rockingham Motor Speedway (International Super Sports Car Circuit, Northamptonshire)	15 September	(United Kingdom) Jack Mitchell	(United Kingdom) Ollie Chadwick	(United Kingdom) Will Palmer	HHC Motorsport
9	R17	Silverstone Circuit (National Circuit, Northamptonshire)	29 September	(United Kingdom) Ollie Chadwick	(United Kingdom) Will Palmer	(Republic of Ireland) Keith Donegan	Douglas Motorsport
9	R18	Silverstone Circuit (National Circuit, Northamptonshire)	29 September	(United Kingdom) Jack Mitchell	(United Kingdom) Ollie Chadwick	(Republic of Ireland) Keith Donegan	Douglas Motorsport
10	R19	Brands Hatch (Grand Prix Circuit, Kent)	12 October	(United Kingdom) Ollie Chadwick	(United Kingdom) Ollie Chadwick	(United Kingdom) Ollie Chadwick	JHR Developments
10	R20	Brands Hatch (Grand Prix Circuit, Kent)	13 October	(United Kingdom) Will Palmer	(United Kingdom) Will Palmer	(United Kingdom) Ollie Chadwick	JHR Developments

== Championship standings ==
Pos	Driver	BHI		DON		THR		OUL		CRO		SNE		KNO		ROC		SIL		BHGP		Total	Drop	Pen.	Pts
1	(United Kingdom) Harry Woodhead	**1**	**1**	**1**	**1**	1	**1**	**1**	**1**	**1**	**1**	2	2	**2**	**1**	2	3	2	2			609			609
2	(Republic of Ireland) Keith Donegan	2	Ret	7	10	2	4	2	3	5	2	1	6	1	3	6	2	1	1	3	Ret	475			475
3	(United Kingdom) Will Palmer	5	2	3	4	**3**	5	11	2	6	3	**3**	**7**	3	2	4	1	11	9	2	**Ret**	442	21	15	406
4	(United Kingdom) Ollie Chadwick	3	6	2	3	11	2	12	Ret	3	Ret	4	3	Ret	4	3	5	**5**	4	**1**	1	409		15	394
5	(United Kingdom) Tom Jackson	4	3	10	5	4	3	4	4	2	6	7	4	4	Ret	15	4	4	7	5	2	396	6		390
6	(United Kingdom) James Kellett	12	5	5	2	5	6	5	6	7	10	8	5	5	10	**1**	8	6	3	4	4	386	21		365
7	(United Kingdom) Jack Mitchell	10	8	4	Ret	6	11	3	5	4	4	5	1	8	6	5	**6**	3	**6**	6	3	382	21	27	334
8	(United Kingdom) Ben Pearson	11	10	12	8	8	10	6	7	8	7	6	8	10	9	10	10	7	5	8	7	276	19		257
9	(United Kingdom) Jack Rawles	6	4	11	Ret	7	7	8	8	9	5	11	9	6	8	13	11	12	13	Ret	6	249		9	240
10	(United Kingdom) Jamie Chadwick	7	7	6	11	Ret	13	7	9	Ret	9	9	11	9	5	7	7	8	14	7	Ret	231		10	221
11	(United Kingdom) Ryan Hadfield	8	12	Ret	9	9	9	9	Ret	10	8	10	10	7	7	9	9	9	8	9	Ret	212			212
12	(United Kingdom) Josh White	13	11	8	6	10	8	10	10	Ret	Ret	Ret	12			8	12	10	16	10	5	176			176
13	(United Kingdom) Connor Mills	9	Ret	9	7	12	12															58			58
14	(United Kingdom) Jonathan Hadfield															12	13	14	11	13	8	56			56
15	(United Kingdom) James Webb															11	15	13	15	11	9	52			52
16	(United Kingdom) William Taylforth															14	14	15	10	12	Ret	40			40
17	(United Kingdom) Tom Brown																	16	12	14	10	32			32
18	(United Kingdom) Elliot Paterson	Ret	9	Ret	Ret																	12			12
Pos	Driver	BHI		DON		THR		OUL		CRO		SNE		KNO		ROC		SIL		BHGP		Total	Drop	Pen.	Pts

Colour	Result
Gold	Winner
Silver	Second place
Bronze	Third place
Green	Points classification
Blue	Non-points classification
Blue	Non-classified finish (NC)
Purple	Retired, not classified (Ret)
Red	Did not qualify (DNQ)
Red	Did not pre-qualify (DNPQ)
Black	Disqualified (DSQ)
White	Did not start (DNS)
White	Withdrew (WD)
White	Race cancelled (C)
Blank	Did not practice (DNP)
Blank	Did not arrive (DNA)
Blank	Excluded (EX)

**Bold** – Pole
Italics – Fastest Lap
