= 2012 Ginetta Junior Championship =

The 2012 Ginetta Junior Championship was a multi-event, one make motor racing championship held across England and Scotland. The championship featured a mix of professional motor racing teams and privately funded drivers, aged between 14 and 17, competing in Ginetta G40s that conformed to the technical regulations for the championship. It formed part of the extensive program of support categories built up around the British Touring Car Championship centrepiece.

This season was the sixth Ginetta Junior Championship. The season commenced on 1 April 2012 at Brands Hatch – on the circuit's Indy configuration – and concluded on 21 October 2012 at the same venue, utilising the Grand Prix circuit, after twenty races at ten meetings, all in support of the 2012 British Touring Car Championship.

== Regulation changes ==
The championship included a new two class structure, with a rookie class running alongside the main class. The rookie class was run by Ginetta instead of independent teams and open to any race driver who had not been in the championship before. The £2,800 cost per weekend was intended to encourage young drivers to enter motorsport.

== Teams and drivers ==
Team	No.	Drivers	Rounds
JHR Developments	3	(United Kingdom) Sennan Fielding	All
JHR Developments	33	(United Kingdom) Ollie Chadwick	All
HHC Motorsport	4	(United Kingdom) Will Palmer	1–4, 6–10
HHC Motorsport	55	(United Kingdom) Charlie Robertson	All
HHC Motorsport	12	(United Kingdom) Tom Jackson	1–3
Privateer	12	(United Kingdom) Tom Jackson	4–10
Privateer	8	(United Kingdom) Finlay Ractliffe	2, 10
Douglas Motorsport	5	(Republic of Ireland) Niall Murray	All
Douglas Motorsport	11	(United Kingdom) Andrew Watson	All
Tollbar Racing with WIRED	17	(United Kingdom) Oliver Basey-Fisher	All
Tollbar Racing with WIRED	22	(United Kingdom) Ricky Collard	4
Hillspeed	21	(United Kingdom) George Gamble	1–2
Hillspeed	25	(Spain) Pepe Massot	All
Hillspeed	27	(United Kingdom) Nathan Harrison	1–3
Hillspeed	51	(United Kingdom) Freddie Lee	6–10
Hillspeed	30	(Republic of Ireland) Keith Donegan	6–7
Beacon Racing	30	(Republic of Ireland) Keith Donegan	1–5, 8–10
Beacon Racing	88	(United Kingdom) Harry Woodhead	1–5
BOMAG Racing	88	(United Kingdom) Harry Woodhead	6–10
RPM Motorsport	43	(United Kingdom) Aiden Moffat	10
RPM Motorsport	72	(United Kingdom) Elliot Paterson	1–2, 4–10

== Race calendar and results ==
The 2012 calendar supports the BTCC at all rounds, with no major changes from 2011.

Round		Circuit	Date	Pole position	Fastest lap	Winning driver	Winning team
1	R1	Brands Hatch (Indy), Kent	1 April	(United Kingdom) Sennan Fielding	(United Kingdom) Charlie Robertson	(Republic of Ireland) Niall Murray	Douglas Motorsport
1	R2	Brands Hatch (Indy), Kent	1 April	(United Kingdom) Charlie Robertson	(United Kingdom) George Gamble	(United Kingdom) Charlie Robertson	HHC Motorsport
2	R3	Donington Park (National), Leicestershire	14 April	(United Kingdom) George Gamble	(United Kingdom) Sennan Fielding	(Republic of Ireland) Niall Murray	Douglas Motorsport
2	R4	Donington Park (National), Leicestershire	15 April	(United Kingdom) George Gamble	(United Kingdom) Sennan Fielding	(United Kingdom) Sennan Fielding	JHR Developments
3	R5	Thruxton Circuit, Hampshire	28 April	(United Kingdom) Charlie Robertson	(United Kingdom) Charlie Robertson	(United Kingdom) Charlie Robertson	HHC Motorsport
3	R6	Thruxton Circuit, Hampshire	29 April	(United Kingdom) Charlie Robertson	(United Kingdom) Charlie Robertson	(United Kingdom) Charlie Robertson	HHC Motorsport
4	R7	Oulton Park (Island), Cheshire	9 June	(United Kingdom) Charlie Robertson	(Republic of Ireland) Niall Murray	(Republic of Ireland) Niall Murray	Douglas Motorsport
4	R8	Oulton Park (Island), Cheshire	10 June	(United Kingdom) Charlie Robertson	(United Kingdom) Charlie Robertson	(Republic of Ireland) Niall Murray	Douglas Motorsport
5	R9	Croft Circuit, North Yorkshire	24 June	(United Kingdom) Sennan Fielding	(Republic of Ireland) Niall Murray	(United Kingdom) Sennan Fielding	JHR Developments
5	R10	Croft Circuit, North Yorkshire	24 June	(United Kingdom) Sennan Fielding	(Republic of Ireland) Niall Murray	(United Kingdom) Sennan Fielding	JHR Developments
6	R11	Snetterton (300) Circuit, Norfolk	12 August	(United Kingdom) Ollie Chadwick	(United Kingdom) Charlie Robertson	(Spain) Pepe Massot	Hillspeed
6	R12	Snetterton (300) Circuit, Norfolk	12 August	(United Kingdom) Ollie Chadwick	(United Kingdom) Sennan Fielding	(United Kingdom) Charlie Robertson	HHC Motorsport
7	R13	Knockhill Racing Circuit, Fife	26 August	(United Kingdom) Charlie Robertson	(United Kingdom) Harry Woodhead	(United Kingdom) Charlie Robertson	HHC Motorsport
7	R14	Knockhill Racing Circuit, Fife	26 August	(United Kingdom) Charlie Robertson	(Republic of Ireland) Niall Murray	(United Kingdom) Charlie Robertson	HHC Motorsport
8	R15	Rockingham Motor Speedway, Northamptonshire	22 September	(United Kingdom) Charlie Robertson	(United Kingdom) Charlie Robertson	(United Kingdom) Ollie Chadwick	JHR Developments
8	R16	Rockingham Motor Speedway, Northamptonshire	23 September	(United Kingdom) Charlie Robertson	(United Kingdom) Sennan Fielding	(United Kingdom) Sennan Fielding	JHR Developments
9	R17	Silverstone (National), Northamptonshire	6 October	(United Kingdom) Charlie Robertson	(United Kingdom) Andrew Watson	(United Kingdom) Andrew Watson	Douglas Motorsport
9	R18	Silverstone (National), Northamptonshire	7 October	(United Kingdom) Charlie Robertson	(United Kingdom) Sennan Fielding	(Spain) Pepe Massot	Hillspeed
10	R19	Brands Hatch (GP), Kent	20 October	(Spain) Pepe Massot	(United Kingdom) Andrew Watson	(Republic of Ireland) Niall Murray	Douglas Motorsport
10	R20	Brands Hatch (GP), Kent	21 October	(United Kingdom) Charlie Robertson	(United Kingdom) Charlie Robertson	(United Kingdom) Sennan Fielding	JHR Developments

== Championship standings ==
Pos	Driver	BHI		DON		THR		OUL		CRO		SNE		KNO		ROC		SIL		BHGP		Total	Drop	Pen.	Pts
1	(United Kingdom) Charlie Robertson	12	1	2	Ret	1	1	4	7	3	2	5	1	1	1	2	2	2	Ret	4	2	524	11	6	507
2	(United Kingdom) Sennan Fielding	7	4	3	1	8	6	3	2	1	1	4	2	2	5	13	1	6	4	6	1	503	22		481
3	(Republic of Ireland) Niall Murray	1	2	1	DSQ	2	2	1	1	4	3	3	3	4	2	6	4	5	3	1	5	527	38	21	468
4	(Spain) Pepe Massot	Ret	6	Ret	2	6	8	2	3	2	4	1	5	6	11	4	5	11	1	2	4	411		16	395
5	(United Kingdom) Andrew Watson	6	7	6	3	5	10	Ret	10	6	11	2	6	5	3	7	Ret	1	2	3	7	367			367
6	(United Kingdom) Harry Woodhead	5	11	5	Ret	3	3	6	4	5	10	8	10	3	7	5	6	3	Ret	5	3	351			351
7	(United Kingdom) Ollie Chadwick	11	5	4	8	12	4	Ret	6	8	5	7	4	Ret	4	1	3	8	8	7	6	334		15	319
8	(Republic of Ireland) Keith Donegan	9	12	7	6	9	9	7	5	9	6	9	7	Ret	6	3	11	4	6	8	10	292	9	9	274
9	(United Kingdom) Oliver Basey-Fisher	3	9	Ret	4	11	11	5	9	11	8	6	9	7	Ret	9	8	7	5	9	8	270		9	261
10	(United Kingdom) Tom Jackson	10	Ret	8	7	10	12	9	8	7	7	Ret	11	Ret	10	11	12	13	9	10	Ret	190			190
11	(United Kingdom) Elliot Paterson	8	13	Ret	10			10	11	10	9	12	12	8	9	12	10	12	10	11	11	181		10	171
12	(United Kingdom) Will Palmer	NC	10	Ret	Ret	4	7	8	12			11	8	10	8	10	9	9	7	13	Ret	180		10	170
13	(United Kingdom) Nathan Harrison	4	8	Ret	5	7	5															92			92
14	(United Kingdom) Freddie Lee											10	Ret	9	Ret	8	7	10	Ret	Ret	9	76			76
15	(United Kingdom) George Gamble	2	3	Ret	DNS																	59		9	50
16	(United Kingdom) Finlay Ractliffe			Ret	9															12	Ret	21			21
17	(United Kingdom) Ricky Collard							11	Ret													10			10
-	(United Kingdom) Aiden Moffat																			Ret	NC	0			0
Pos	Driver	BHI		DON		THR		OUL		CRO		SNE		KNO		ROC		SIL		BHGP		Total	Drop	Pen.	Pts

Colour	Result
Gold	Winner
Silver	Second place
Bronze	Third place
Green	Points classification
Blue	Non-points classification
Blue	Non-classified finish (NC)
Purple	Retired, not classified (Ret)
Red	Did not qualify (DNQ)
Red	Did not pre-qualify (DNPQ)
Black	Disqualified (DSQ)
White	Did not start (DNS)
White	Withdrew (WD)
White	Race cancelled (C)
Blank	Did not practice (DNP)
Blank	Did not arrive (DNA)
Blank	Excluded (EX)
