= 2023 Nürburgring Langstrecken-Serie =

46th season of the German endurance series

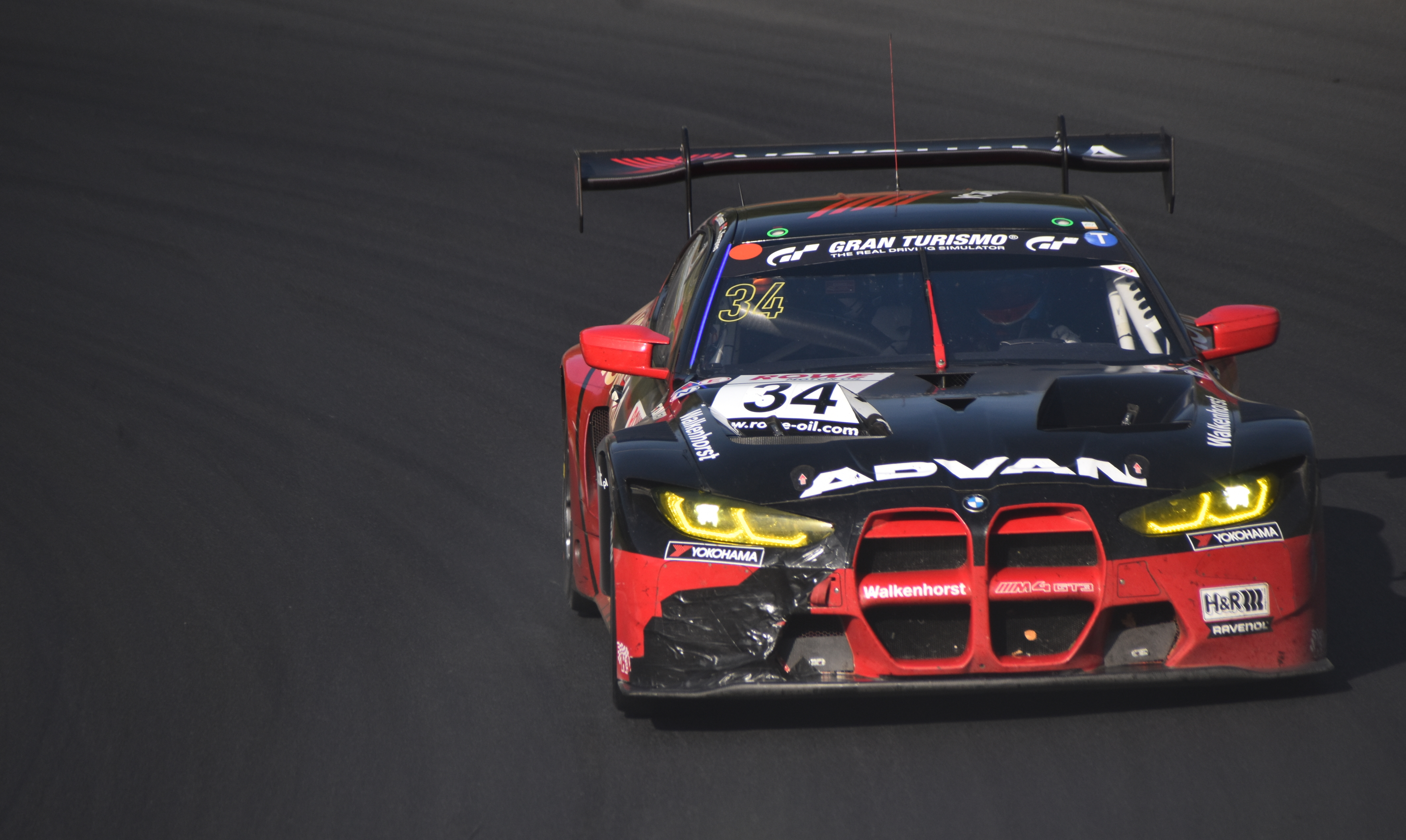
2023 Overall Teams Champions, #34 Walkenhorst Motorsport

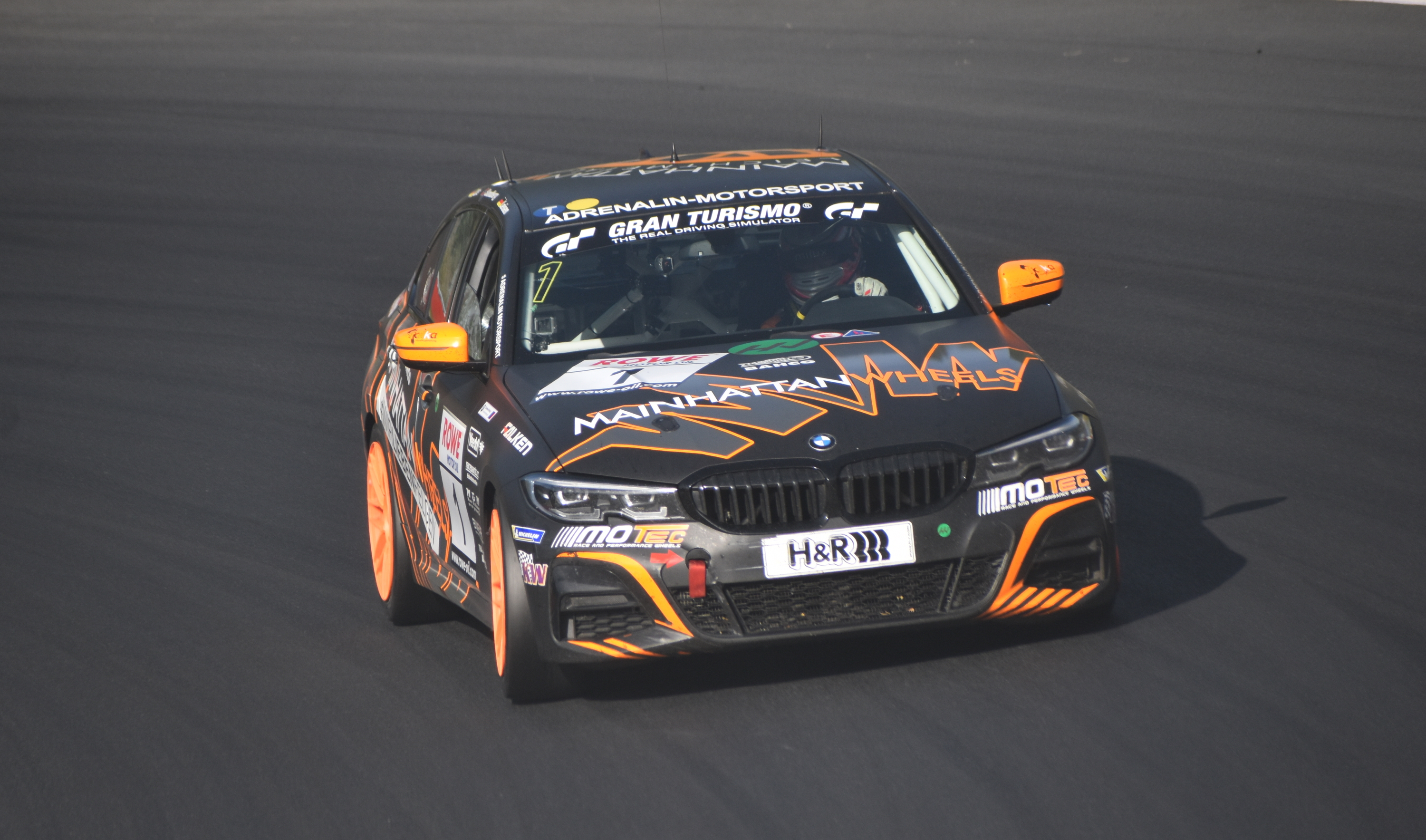
#1 Adrenalin Motorsport Team Motec car of 2023 Drivers Champions Philipp Leisen, Oskar Sandberg and Daniel Zils

The 2023 Nürburgring Langstrecken-Serie is the 46th season of the German endurance series (formerly VLN) run at the Nürburgring Nordschleife, and fourth run as the Nürburgring Langstrecken-Serie (NLS). The season began on 17 March and will end on 7 October.

The drivers championship was won by Philipp Leisen, Oskar Sandberg and Daniel Zils, driving a BMW 330i for Adrenalin Motorsport Team Motec.

== Calendar ==
Rnd.	Race	Length	Circuit	Date
1	68. ADAC Westfalenfahrt	4 hours	(Germany) Nürburgring Nordschleife	18 March
2	47. NIMEX DMV 4-Stunden-Rennen	4 hours	(Germany) Nürburgring Nordschleife	1 April
3	54. Adenauer ADAC Rundstrecken-Trophy	4 hours	(Germany) Nürburgring Nordschleife	15 April
4	46. RCM DMV Grenzlandrennen	4 hours	(Germany) Nürburgring Nordschleife	17 June
5	ROWE 6h ADAC Ruhr-Pokal-Rennen	6 hours	(Germany) Nürburgring Nordschleife	8 July
6-7	12h Nürburgring		(Germany) Nürburgring Nordschleife	9–10 September
6-7	63. ADAC ACAS Cup	6 hours	(Germany) Nürburgring Nordschleife	9–10 September
6-7	62. ADAC Reinoldus-Langstreckenrennen	6 hours	(Germany) Nürburgring Nordschleife	9–10 September
8	55. ADAC Barbarossapreis	4 hours	(Germany) Nürburgring Nordschleife	23 September
9	47. PAGID Racing DMV Münsterlandpokal	4 hours	(Germany) Nürburgring Nordschleife	7 October

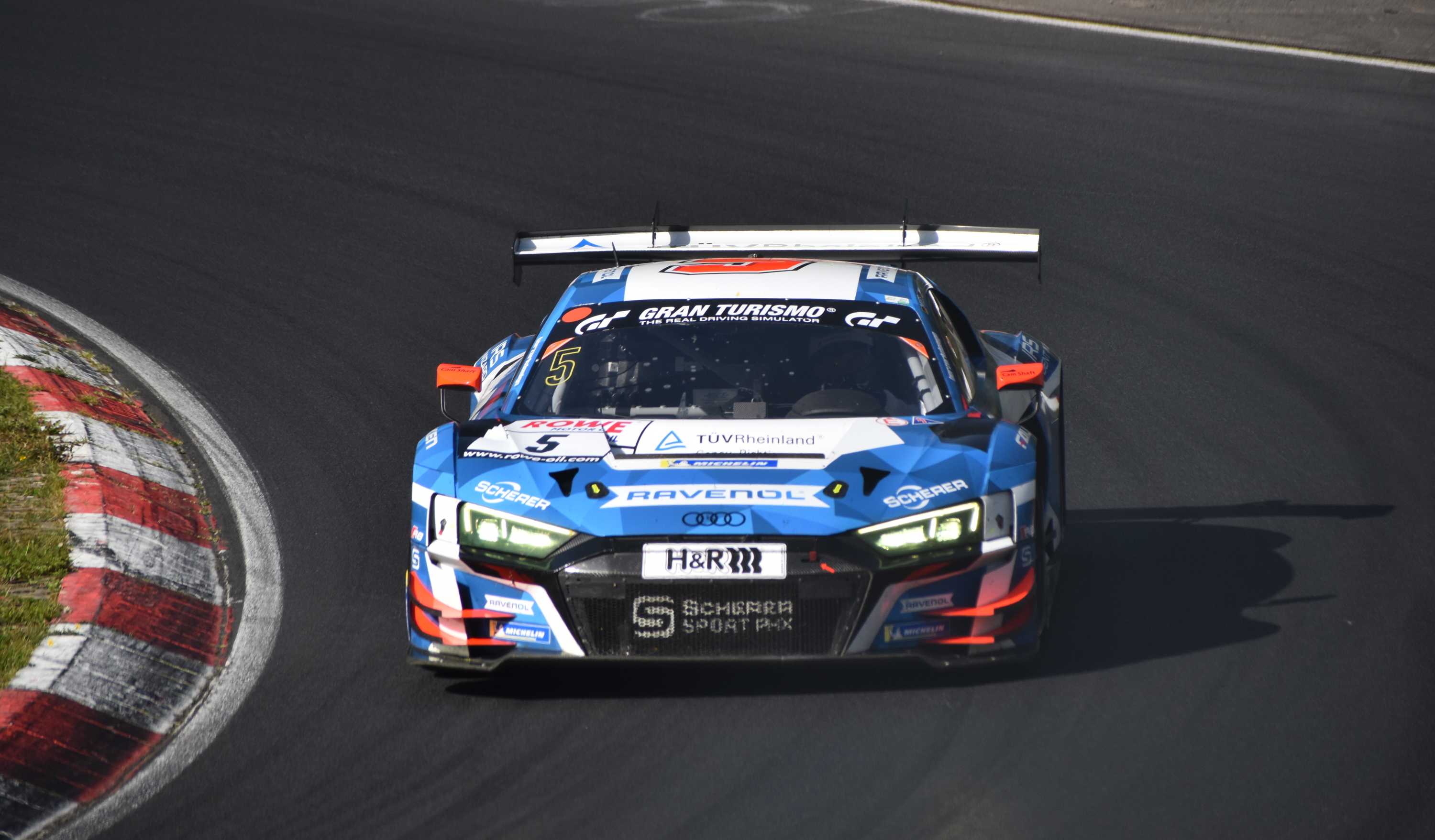
2nd in overall teams championship, #5 Scherer Sport PHX

== Classes ==
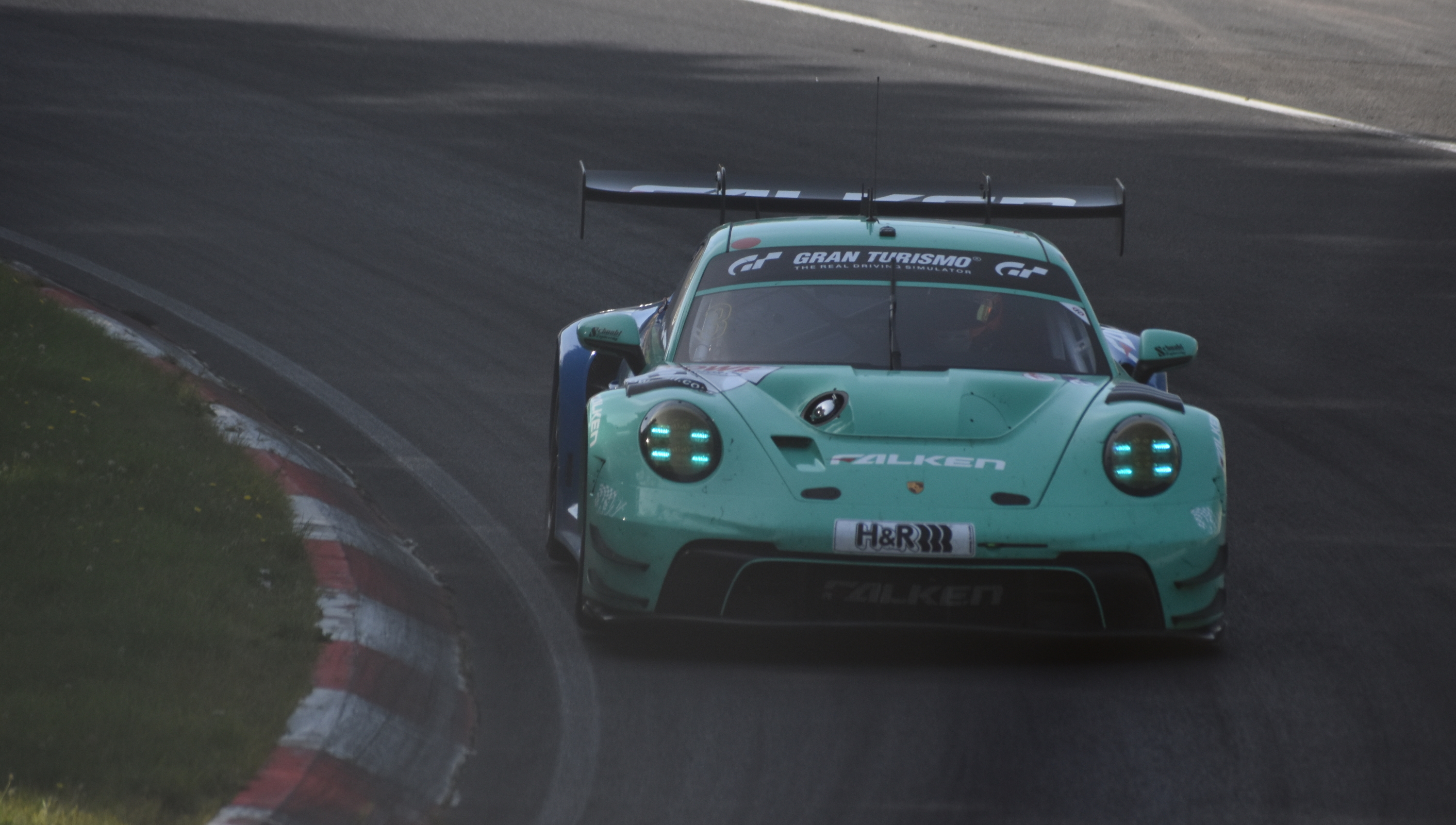
3rd in overall teams championship, #3 Falken Motorsports

Entries are split into multiple different classes. Current classes are:

	Class
NLS specials
SP2	Purpose-built racecars with an engine capacity between 1400 and 1749 cc.
SP2T	Purpose-built racecars with a turbocharged-engine capacity between 1400 and 1749 cc and a turbocharger.
SP3	Purpose-built racecars with an engine capacity between 1750 and 1999 cc.
SP3T	Purpose-built racecars with a turbocharged-engine capacity between 1750 and 1999 cc and a turbocharger.
SP4	Purpose-built racecars with an engine capacity between 2000 and 2499 cc.
SP4T	Purpose-built racecars with a turbocharged-engine capacity between 2000 and 2499 cc and a turbocharger.
SP5	Purpose-built racecars with an engine capacity between 2500 and 2999 cc.
SP6	Purpose-built racecars with an engine capacity between 3000 and 3499 cc.
SP7	Purpose-built racecars with an engine capacity between 3500 and 3999 cc.
SP8	Purpose-built racecars with an engine capacity over 4000 cc.
SP8T	Purpose-built racecars with a turbocharged-engine capacity between 2600 and 4000 cc.
SP9	For FIA-homologated Group GT3 cars. GT3 sub-classes based on driver ranking system maintained by the FIA.
SP9 Pro, SP9 Pro-Am & SP9 Am	For FIA-homologated Group GT3 cars. GT3 sub-classes based on driver ranking system maintained by the FIA.
SP10	For FIA and SRO-homologated Group GT4 cars.
SP-Pro	Prototype racecars with an engine capacity over 3000 cc.
SP-X	'Special vehicles' which do not fit into any other class.
AT(-G)	Vehicles using alternative fuel sources (e.g. electric, LPG, hydrogen, etc.)
TCR touring cars
TCR	FIA-homologated TCR Touring Cars. TCR sub-classes based on driver ranking system.
TCR Pro & TCR Am	FIA-homologated TCR Touring Cars. TCR sub-classes based on driver ranking system.
NLS production cars
V3	Production cars with an engine capacity between 1600 and 1999 cc.
V4	Production cars with an engine capacity between 2000 and 2499 cc.
V5	Production cars with an engine capacity between 2500 and 2999 cc.
V6	Production cars with an engine capacity over 3500 cc.
VT1	Production cars with an engine capacity between 1000 and 1999 cc and a turbocharger.
VT2	Production cars with an engine capacity between 2000 and 2999 cc and a turbocharger.
VT3	Production cars with an engine capacity over 3000cc and a turbocharger.
VT Hybrid	Production cars with a hybrid-engine.
V Elektro	Production cars with an electro-engine.
Porsche Endurance Trophy Nürburgring Class cars Cup classes are for single make identical or near identical specification cars
Cup 2	Porsche 992 GT3 Cup cars.
Cup 3	Porsche Cayman GT4 Trophy cars.
Cup Class cars Cup classes are for single make identical or near identical specification cars
M2 CS	BMW M2 CS cars.
M240i	BMW M240i Racing Cup cars.
OPC	Opel Astra OPC cars.
Gruppe H historic cars
H2	Pre-2008 production cars and purpose-built racecars with an engine capacity up to 1999 cc.
H4	Pre-2008 production cars and purpose-built racecars with an engine capacity between 2000 and 6250 cc.

== Entry list ==
=== NLS Specials ===
==== SP9 ====
Team	Car	No.	Drivers	Class	Rounds
SP9
(Germany) Schnitzelalm Racing	Mercedes-AMG GT3 Evo	2	(Germany) Kenneth Heyer	PA	2
(Germany) Schnitzelalm Racing	Mercedes-AMG GT3 Evo	2	(Germany) Marcel Marchewicz	PA	2
(Germany) Schnitzelalm Racing	Mercedes-AMG GT3 Evo	2	(Germany) Peter Posavac	PA	2
(Germany) Schnitzelalm Racing	Mercedes-AMG GT3 Evo	2	(Finland) Juuso Puhakka	PA	2
(Germany) Schnitzelalm Racing	Mercedes-AMG GT3 Evo	11	(Germany) Marcel Marchewicz	P	1-8
(Germany) Schnitzelalm Racing	Mercedes-AMG GT3 Evo	11	(Germany) Marek Böckmann	P	1
(Germany) Schnitzelalm Racing	Mercedes-AMG GT3 Evo	11	(Germany) Patrick Assenheimer	P	2-3, 5-6
(Germany) Schnitzelalm Racing	Mercedes-AMG GT3 Evo	11	(Canada) Mikaël Grenier	P	2
(Germany) Schnitzelalm Racing	Mercedes-AMG GT3 Evo	11	(Germany) Tim Neuser	P	3-5
(Germany) Schnitzelalm Racing	Mercedes-AMG GT3 Evo	11	(Netherlands) Colin Caresani	P	3-4, 6
(Germany) Schnitzelalm Racing	Mercedes-AMG GT3 Evo	11	(Switzerland) Philip Ellis	P	6-7
(Germany) Schnitzelalm Racing	Mercedes-AMG GT3 Evo	11	(Germany) Luca-Sandro Trefz	P	7-8
(Germany) Schnitzelalm Racing	Mercedes-AMG GT3 Evo	11	(Germany) Kenneth Heyer	P	7-8
(Germany) Falken Motorsports	Porsche 911 GT3 R	3	(Germany) Sven Müller	P	1, 3, 9
(Germany) Falken Motorsports	Porsche 911 GT3 R	3	(Sweden) Joel Eriksson	P	1, 5
(Germany) Falken Motorsports	Porsche 911 GT3 R	3	(Austria) Klaus Bachler	P	2, 6
(Germany) Falken Motorsports	Porsche 911 GT3 R	3	(Belgium) Alessio Picariello	P	2, 9
(Germany) Falken Motorsports	Porsche 911 GT3 R	3	(Germany) Nico Menzel	P	3
(Germany) Falken Motorsports	Porsche 911 GT3 R	3	(Austria) Martin Ragginger	P	3
(Germany) Falken Motorsports	Porsche 911 GT3 R	3	(United Kingdom) David Pittard	P	5-6
(Germany) Falken Motorsports	Porsche 911 GT3 R	4	(Austria) Martin Ragginger	P	1, 3, 5-6
(Germany) Falken Motorsports	Porsche 911 GT3 R	4	(Germany) Nico Menzel	P	1, 3, 9
(Germany) Falken Motorsports	Porsche 911 GT3 R	4	(Germany) Tim Heinemann	P	2, 9
(Germany) Falken Motorsports	Porsche 911 GT3 R	4	(Sweden) Joel Eriksson	P	2
(Germany) Falken Motorsports	Porsche 911 GT3 R	4	(Germany) Sven Müller	P	3
(Germany) Falken Motorsports	Porsche 911 GT3 R	4	(Germany) Dennis Fetzer	P	5-6
(Germany) Scherer Sport PHX	Audi R8 LMS GT3 Evo II	5	(Germany) Frank Stippler	P	All
(Germany) Scherer Sport PHX	Audi R8 LMS GT3 Evo II	5	(Germany) Vincent Kolb	P	1, 3-8
(Germany) Scherer Sport PHX	Audi R8 LMS GT3 Evo II	5	(Netherlands) Renger van der Zande	P	2
(Germany) Scherer Sport PHX	Audi R8 LMS GT3 Evo II	5	(Germany) Markus Winkelhock	P	2
(Germany) Scherer Sport PHX	Audi R8 LMS GT3 Evo II	5	(Germany) Christopher Mies	P	9
(Germany) Scherer Sport PHX	Audi R8 LMS GT3 Evo II	16	(Germany) Kim-Luis Schramm	P	1-2
(Germany) Scherer Sport PHX	Audi R8 LMS GT3 Evo II	16	(Switzerland) Ricardo Feller	P	1
(Germany) Scherer Sport PHX	Audi R8 LMS GT3 Evo II	16	(Italy) Michele Beretta	P	2-3
(Germany) Scherer Sport PHX	Audi R8 LMS GT3 Evo II	16	(Germany) Markus Winkelhock	P	2-3
(Germany) Audi Sport Scherer Sport PHX	Audi R8 LMS GT3 Evo II	15	(Belgium) Frédéric Vervisch	P	2-3
(Germany) Audi Sport Scherer Sport PHX	Audi R8 LMS GT3 Evo II	15	(Italy) Mattia Drudi	P	2-3
(Germany) Audi Sport Scherer Sport PHX	Audi R8 LMS GT3 Evo II	15	(Denmark) Dennis Lind	P	2
(Germany) Audi Sport Scherer Sport PHX	Audi R8 LMS GT3 Evo II	15	(Germany) Timo Scheider	P	3
(Germany) Haupt Racing Team	Mercedes-AMG GT3 Evo	6	(India) Arjun Maini	P	1-2, 9
(Germany) Haupt Racing Team	Mercedes-AMG GT3 Evo	6	(Germany) Hubert Haupt	P	1-2
(Germany) Haupt Racing Team	Mercedes-AMG GT3 Evo	6	(Australia) Jordan Love	P	1-2
(Germany) Haupt Racing Team	Mercedes-AMG GT3 Evo	6	(United Kingdom) Frank Bird	P	9
(Germany) Haupt Racing Team	Mercedes-AMG GT3 Evo	6	(Estonia) Ralf Aron	P	9
(Germany) Konrad Motorsport	Lamborghini Huracán GT3 Evo	7	(Germany) Maximilian Hackländer	P	1
(Germany) Konrad Motorsport	Lamborghini Huracán GT3 Evo	7	(Zimbabwe) Axcil Jefferies	P	2
(Germany) Konrad Motorsport	Lamborghini Huracán GT3 Evo	7	(Netherlands) Yelmer Buurman	P	2
(Germany) Mercedes-AMG Team Bilstein	Mercedes-AMG GT3 Evo	8	(Switzerland) Raffaele Marciello	P	1-3
(Germany) Mercedes-AMG Team Bilstein	Mercedes-AMG GT3 Evo	8	(Germany) Luca Stolz	P	1-2
(Germany) Mercedes-AMG Team Bilstein	Mercedes-AMG GT3 Evo	8	(Switzerland) Philip Ellis	P	2
(Germany) Mercedes-AMG Team Bilstein	Mercedes-AMG GT3 Evo	8	(Australia) Jordan Love	P	3
(Germany) GetSpeed Performance 2-3 (Germany) Mercedes-AMG Team GetSpeed 9	Mercedes-AMG GT3 Evo	9	(Germany) Maro Engel	P	2-3
(Germany) GetSpeed Performance 2-3 (Germany) Mercedes-AMG Team GetSpeed 9	Mercedes-AMG GT3 Evo	9	(France) Jules Gounon	P	2
(Germany) GetSpeed Performance 2-3 (Germany) Mercedes-AMG Team GetSpeed 9	Mercedes-AMG GT3 Evo	9	(Spain) Daniel Juncadella	P	2
(Germany) GetSpeed Performance 2-3 (Germany) Mercedes-AMG Team GetSpeed 9	Mercedes-AMG GT3 Evo	9	(Germany) Fabian Schiller	P	3, 9
(Germany) GetSpeed Performance 2-3 (Germany) Mercedes-AMG Team GetSpeed 9	Mercedes-AMG GT3 Evo	9	(United Kingdom) Adam Christodoulou	P	3
(Germany) GetSpeed Performance 2-3 (Germany) Mercedes-AMG Team GetSpeed 9	Mercedes-AMG GT3 Evo	9	(Austria) Lucas Auer	P	9
(Germany) GetSpeed Performance 2-3 (Germany) Mercedes-AMG Team GetSpeed 9	Mercedes-AMG GT3 Evo	12	(United Kingdom) Adam Christodoulou	P	2-3
(Germany) GetSpeed Performance 2-3 (Germany) Mercedes-AMG Team GetSpeed 9	Mercedes-AMG GT3 Evo	12	(Germany) Maximilian Götz	P	2-3
(Germany) GetSpeed Performance 2-3 (Germany) Mercedes-AMG Team GetSpeed 9	Mercedes-AMG GT3 Evo	12	(Germany) Fabian Schiller	P	2-3
(Germany) PROsport-Racing	Aston Martin Vantage AMR GT3	17	(Belgium) Maxime Dumarey	Am	1-2
(Germany) PROsport-Racing	Aston Martin Vantage AMR GT3	17	(Germany) Christoph Breuer	Am	1-2
(Germany) PROsport-Racing	Aston Martin Vantage AMR GT3	17	(Belgium) Maxime Dumarey	PA	3-9
(Germany) PROsport-Racing	Aston Martin Vantage AMR GT3	17	(Germany) Mike David Ortmann	PA	3-5, 9
(Germany) PROsport-Racing	Aston Martin Vantage AMR GT3	17	(Germany) Christoph Breuer	PA	3, 6-7
(Germany) PROsport-Racing	Aston Martin Vantage AMR GT3	17	(Germany) Marek Böckmann	PA	6-9
(Germany) PROsport-Racing	Aston Martin Vantage AMR GT3	37	(Germany) Mike David Ortmann	P	1, 9
(Germany) PROsport-Racing	Aston Martin Vantage AMR GT3	37	(Germany) Nico Bastian	P	9
(Germany) PROsport-Racing	Aston Martin Vantage AMR GT3	37	(Germany) Marek Böckmann	P	9
(Italy) Dinamic GT	Porsche 911 GT3 R	18	(Germany) Laurin Heinrich	P	1-2
(Italy) Dinamic GT	Porsche 911 GT3 R	18	(Germany) Christian Engelhart	P	1
(Italy) Dinamic GT	Porsche 911 GT3 R	18	(Turkey) Ayhancan Güven	P	1
(Italy) Dinamic GT	Porsche 911 GT3 R	18	(Belgium) Laurens Vanthoor	P	2
(Italy) Dinamic GT	Porsche 911 GT3 R	18	(Belgium) Adrien De Leener	P	9
(Italy) Dinamic GT	Porsche 911 GT3 R	18	(Norway) Dennis Olsen	P	9
(Germany) racing one	Ferrari 296 GT3	19	(Germany) Christian Kohlhaas	PA	2-3, 5-8
(Germany) racing one	Ferrari 296 GT3	19	(United Kingdom) Jody Fannin	PA	2
(Germany) racing one	Ferrari 296 GT3	19	(Germany) Stefan Aust	PA	3, 6-8
(Germany) racing one	Ferrari 296 GT3	19	(Germany) Luca Ludwig	PA	3, 6-7
(Germany) racing one	Ferrari 296 GT3	19	(Zimbabwe) Axcil Jefferies	PA	5
(Germany) racing one	Ferrari 296 GT3	19	(Germany) "Jacob Schell"	PA	6-8
(Germany) Car Collection Motorsport	Audi R8 LMS GT3 Evo II	20	(Germany) Florian Spengler	PA	9
(Germany) Car Collection Motorsport	Audi R8 LMS GT3 Evo II	20	(Germany) Marcus Winkelhock	PA	9
(Germany) Audi Sport Team Car Collection	Audi R8 LMS GT3 Evo II	33	(Germany) Dennis Marschall	P	1, 3
(Germany) Audi Sport Team Car Collection	Audi R8 LMS GT3 Evo II	33	(Germany) Luca Engstler	P	1
(Germany) Audi Sport Team Car Collection	Audi R8 LMS GT3 Evo II	33	(Belgium) Gilles Magnus	P	1
(Germany) Audi Sport Team Car Collection	Audi R8 LMS GT3 Evo II	33	(Austria) Max Hofer	P	3
(Germany) Rutronik Racing	Porsche 911 GT3 R	21	(Germany) Tobias Müller	P	1, 3
(Germany) Rutronik Racing	Porsche 911 GT3 R	21	(Norway) Dennis Olsen	P	1
(Germany) Rutronik Racing	Porsche 911 GT3 R	21	(France) Julien Andlauer	P	2, 9
(Germany) Rutronik Racing	Porsche 911 GT3 R	21	(Italy) Matteo Cairoli	P	2
(Germany) Rutronik Racing	Porsche 911 GT3 R	21	(Austria) Marco Holzer	P	3
(Germany) Rutronik Racing	Porsche 911 GT3 R	21	(Switzerland) Patric Niederhauser	P	9
(Germany) Wochenspiegel Team Monschau by Rinaldi Racing	Ferrari 296 GT3	22	(Germany) Leonard Weiss	P	1, 3
(Germany) Wochenspiegel Team Monschau by Rinaldi Racing	Ferrari 296 GT3	22	(Germany) Daniel Keilwitz	P	1, 3
(Germany) Wochenspiegel Team Monschau by Rinaldi Racing	Ferrari 296 GT3	22	(Germany) Jochen Krumbach	P	1
(Germany) Wochenspiegel Team Monschau by Rinaldi Racing	Ferrari 296 GT3	22	(Netherlands) Indy Dontje	P	3
(Germany) Wochenspiegel Team Monschau by Rinaldi Racing	Ferrari 296 GT3	22	(Germany) Jochen Krumbach	PA	2
(Germany) Wochenspiegel Team Monschau by Rinaldi Racing	Ferrari 296 GT3	22	(Germany) Leonard Weiss	PA	2
(Germany) Wochenspiegel Team Monschau by Rinaldi Racing	Ferrari 296 GT3	22	(Netherlands) Indy Dontje	PA	2
(Germany) Dörr Motorsport	Aston Martin Vantage AMR GT3	24	(Germany) Phil Dörr	P	5-9
(Germany) Dörr Motorsport	Aston Martin Vantage AMR GT3	24	(Germany) Ben Dörr	P	5-9
(Germany) Dörr Motorsport	Aston Martin Vantage AMR GT3	24	(Denmark) Nicki Thiim	P	6-7
(Germany) Dörr Motorsport	Aston Martin Vantage AMR GT3	24	(United Kingdom) Darren Turner	P	8-9
(Germany) Huber Motorsport	Porsche 911 GT3 R	25	(Germany) Dennis Fetzer	PA	1, 3-4
(Germany) Huber Motorsport	Porsche 911 GT3 R	25	(Germany) Klaus Rader	PA	1, 3-4
(Germany) Huber Motorsport	Porsche 911 GT3 R	25	(Germany) Joachim Thyssen	PA	1, 3, 6-7
(Germany) Huber Motorsport	Porsche 911 GT3 R	25	(France) Côme Ledogar	PA	3
(Germany) Huber Motorsport	Porsche 911 GT3 R	25	(Germany) Hans Wehrmann	PA	4, 6-7
(Germany) Huber Motorsport	Porsche 911 GT3 R	25	(Luxembourg) Carlos Rivas	PA	4
(Germany) Huber Motorsport	Porsche 911 GT3 R	25	(New Zealand) Jaxon Evans	PA	6-7
(Germany) Huber Motorsport	Porsche 911 GT3 R	25	(Germany) Dennis Fetzer	P	2
(Germany) Huber Motorsport	Porsche 911 GT3 R	25	(France) Côme Ledogar	P	2
(Germany) Huber Motorsport	Porsche 911 GT3 R	25	(Germany) Lars Kern	P	2
(Switzerland) Octane126	Ferrari 296 GT3	26	(Germany) Björn Grossmann	P	4
(Switzerland) Octane126	Ferrari 296 GT3	26	(Switzerland) Jonathan Hirschi	P	4
(Switzerland) Octane126	Ferrari 296 GT3	26	(Germany) Luca Ludwig	P	4
(Germany) Abt Sportsline	Lamborghini Huracán GT3 Evo	27	(Italy) Marco Mapelli	P	1-2
(Germany) Abt Sportsline	Lamborghini Huracán GT3 Evo	27	(South Africa) Kelvin van der Linde	P	1
(Germany) Abt Sportsline	Lamborghini Huracán GT3 Evo	27	(South Africa) Jordan Pepper	P	2
(Germany) Abt Sportsline	Lamborghini Huracán GT3 Evo	27	(Denmark) Nicki Thiim	P	2
(Germany) Frikadelli Racing Team	Ferrari 296 GT3	30	(Germany) Klaus Abbelen	PA	1, 9
(Germany) Frikadelli Racing Team	Ferrari 296 GT3	30	(Germany) Felipe Fernández Laser	PA	1
(Germany) Frikadelli Racing Team	Ferrari 296 GT3	30	(United Kingdom) David Pittard	PA	9
(Germany) Frikadelli Racing Team	Ferrari 296 GT3	30	(United Kingdom) David Pittard	P	2-3, 8
(Germany) Frikadelli Racing Team	Ferrari 296 GT3	30	(Netherlands) Nick Catsburg	P	2, 8
(Germany) Frikadelli Racing Team	Ferrari 296 GT3	30	(New Zealand) Earl Bamber	P	2
(Germany) Frikadelli Racing Team	Ferrari 296 GT3	30	(Germany) Felipe Fernández Laser	P	3, 8
(Germany) Walkenhorst Motorsport	BMW M4 GT3	34	(Poland) Jakub Giermaziak	P	All
(Germany) Walkenhorst Motorsport	BMW M4 GT3	34	(Spain) Andy Soucek	P	1
(Germany) Walkenhorst Motorsport	BMW M4 GT3	34	(Finland) Jesse Krohn	P	2-3
(Germany) Walkenhorst Motorsport	BMW M4 GT3	34	(Norway) Christian Krognes	P	4-9
(Germany) Walkenhorst Motorsport	BMW M4 GT3	35	(France) Thomas Neubauer	P	1-5
(Germany) Walkenhorst Motorsport	BMW M4 GT3	35	(United Kingdom) Jake Dennis	P	1, 3
(Germany) Walkenhorst Motorsport	BMW M4 GT3	35	(Germany) Jens Klingmann	P	2-3
(Germany) Walkenhorst Motorsport	BMW M4 GT3	35	(Luxembourg) Dylan Pereira	P	4-9
(Germany) Walkenhorst Motorsport	BMW M4 GT3	35	(Germany) Niklas Krütten	P	4-7
(Germany) Walkenhorst Motorsport	BMW M4 GT3	35	(Finland) Sami-Matti Trogen	P	8-9
(Germany) Walkenhorst Motorsport	BMW M4 GT3	36	(Germany) Henry Walkenhorst	PA	3
(Germany) Walkenhorst Motorsport	BMW M4 GT3	36	(Germany) Jörg Breuer	PA	3, 6
(Germany) Walkenhorst Motorsport	BMW M4 GT3	36	(Germany) Peter Posavac	PA	3, 7
(Germany) Walkenhorst Motorsport	BMW M4 GT3	36	(Germany) Carrie Schreiner	PA	6-7
(Germany) Walkenhorst Motorsport	BMW M4 GT3	36	(Belgium) Charles Weerts	PA	6-7
(Germany) Walkenhorst Motorsport	BMW M4 GT3	36	(Germany) Christian Bollrath	PA	6-7
(Germany) Audi Sport Team Land	Audi R8 LMS GT3 Evo II	39	(Germany) Christopher Haase	P	2-3
(Germany) Audi Sport Team Land	Audi R8 LMS GT3 Evo II	39	(Germany) Christopher Mies	P	2-3
(Germany) Audi Sport Team Land	Audi R8 LMS GT3 Evo II	39	(Switzerland) Patric Niederhauser	P	2-3
(Germany) Lionspeed by Car Collection Motorsport	Porsche 911 GT3 R	42	(Germany) Patrick Kolb	P	3
(Germany) Lionspeed by Car Collection Motorsport	Porsche 911 GT3 R	42	(Germany) Marco Seefried	P	3
(Germany) BMW Junior Team	BMW M4 GT3	44	(United Kingdom) Daniel Harper	P	1-3
(Germany) BMW Junior Team	BMW M4 GT3	44	(Germany) Max Hesse	P	1-3
(Germany) BMW Junior Team	BMW M4 GT3	44	(United States) Neil Verhagen	P	1-3
(United States) CP Racing	Mercedes-AMG GT3 Evo	45	(United States) Charles Espenlaub	PA	1-4, 6-9
(United States) CP Racing	Mercedes-AMG GT3 Evo	45	(United States) Shane Lewis	PA	1-4, 6-9
(United States) CP Racing	Mercedes-AMG GT3 Evo	45	(Belgium) Maxime Soulet	PA	1, 3
(United States) CP Racing	Mercedes-AMG GT3 Evo	45	(United States) Charlie Putman	PA	3-4, 6-9
(United States) CP Racing	Mercedes-AMG GT3 Evo	45	(United Kingdom) Adam Christodoulou	PA	6-7, 9
(Germany) équipe vitesse	Audi R8 LMS GT3 Evo II	50	(Germany) Michael Heimrich	Am	2, 4-7
(Germany) équipe vitesse	Audi R8 LMS GT3 Evo II	50	(Germany) Lorenzo Rocco	Am	2, 4-7
(Germany) équipe vitesse	Audi R8 LMS GT3 Evo II	50	(Germany) Arno Klasen	Am	2, 4-7
(Germany) ROWE Racing	BMW M4 GT3	98	(Belgium) Dries Vanthoor	P	1, 3
(Germany) ROWE Racing	BMW M4 GT3	98	(Belgium) Maxime Martin	P	1
(Germany) ROWE Racing	BMW M4 GT3	98	(South Africa) Sheldon van der Linde	P	2-3
(Germany) ROWE Racing	BMW M4 GT3	98	(United States) Connor De Phillippi	P	2
(Germany) ROWE Racing	BMW M4 GT3	98	(Germany) Marco Wittmann	P	2
(Germany) ROWE Racing	BMW M4 GT3	99	(Belgium) Maxime Martin	P	1, 3
(Germany) ROWE Racing	BMW M4 GT3	99	(Belgium) Dries Vanthoor	P	1
(Germany) ROWE Racing	BMW M4 GT3	99	(Austria) Philipp Eng	P	2
(Germany) ROWE Racing	BMW M4 GT3	99	(Brazil) Augusto Farfus Jr.	P	2
(Germany) ROWE Racing	BMW M4 GT3	99	(United Kingdom) Nick Yelloly	P	2
(Germany) ROWE Racing	BMW M4 GT3	99	(Germany) Marco Wittmann	P	3
(Germany) Manthey EMA	Porsche 911 GT3 R	911	(Austria) Thomas Preining	P	1-2
(Germany) Manthey EMA	Porsche 911 GT3 R	911	(Austria) Marco Holzer	P	1
(Germany) Manthey EMA	Porsche 911 GT3 R	911	(France) Kévin Estre	P	2

Icon	Class
SP9
P	Pro Cup
PA	Pro-Am Cup
Am	Am Cup

==== Other NLS specials ====
Team	Car	No.	Drivers	Rounds
SP-X
(Germany) Haupt Racing Team	Mercedes-AMG GT2	52	(Germany) Thomas Jäger	4
(Germany) Haupt Racing Team	Mercedes-AMG GT2	52	(Estonia) Ralf Aron	4
(Germany) Schnitzelalm Racing	Mercedes-AMG GT2	53	(Germany) Peter Posavac	4
(Germany) Schnitzelalm Racing	Mercedes-AMG GT2	53	(Germany) Jay Mo Härtling	4
SP-Pro
	Porsche 991.2 GT3 Cup MR	347	(Germany) Dieter Schmidtmann	5
	Porsche 991.2 GT3 Cup MR	347	(Thailand) Sak Nana	5
	Porsche 991.2 GT3 Cup MR	347	(Germany) Christoph Breuer	5
SP10
(Hong Kong) KCMG	Toyota GR Supra GT4	47	(Italy) Edoardo Liberati	1-3
(Hong Kong) KCMG	Toyota GR Supra GT4	47	(Estonia) Martin Rump	1-3
(Hong Kong) KCMG	Toyota GR Supra GT4	47	(Australia) Josh Burdon	2-3
(Germany) W&S Motorsport	Porsche 718 GT4 RS	164	(Germany) "Max"	3
(Germany) W&S Motorsport	Porsche 718 GT4 RS	164	(Germany) "Jens"	3
(Germany) Toyo Tires with Ring Racing	Toyota GR Supra GT4	170	(Germany) Michael Tischner	1-8
(Germany) Toyo Tires with Ring Racing	Toyota GR Supra GT4	170	(Germany) Andreas Gülden	1-3, 6-9
(Germany) Toyo Tires with Ring Racing	Toyota GR Supra GT4	170	(Germany) Heiko Tönges	1-2, 4-9
(Germany) Toyo Tires with Ring Racing	Toyota GR Supra GT4	170	(Germany) Lance David Arnold	3
(Germany) Toyo Tires with Ring Racing	Toyota GR Supra GT4	170	(Germany) Uwe Kleen	4-5
(Germany) Toyo Tires with Ring Racing	Toyota GR Supra GT4	170	(Germany) Tim Sandtler	5, 9
(Germany) Toyo Tires with Ring Racing	Toyota GR Supra GT4	171	(Japan) Takayuki Kinoshita	2-3, 6-7, 9
(Germany) Toyo Tires with Ring Racing	Toyota GR Supra GT4	171	(Germany) Tim Sandtler	2-3, 6-7
(Germany) Toyo Tires with Ring Racing	Toyota GR Supra GT4	171	(Germany) Lance David Arnold	2
(Germany) Toyo Tires with Ring Racing	Toyota GR Supra GT4	171	(Germany) Heiko Tönges	3
(Germany) Toyo Tires with Ring Racing	Toyota GR Supra GT4	171	(Germany) Marc Hennerici	6-7, 9
(Germany) Toyo Tires with Ring Racing	Toyota GR Supra GT4	171	(Germany) Michael Tischner	9
(Germany) PROsport-Racing	Aston Martin Vantage AMR GT4	175	(Belgium) Guillaume Dumarey	2-3
(Germany) PROsport-Racing	Aston Martin Vantage AMR GT4	175	(Germany) Mike David Ortmann	2
(Germany) PROsport-Racing	Aston Martin Vantage AMR GT4	175	(Germany) Hugo Sasse	3, 9
(Germany) PROsport-Racing	Aston Martin Vantage AMR GT4	175	(Belgium) Guido Dumarey	5
(Germany) PROsport-Racing	Aston Martin Vantage AMR GT4	175	(Ukraine) Yevgen Sokolovskiy	5
(Germany) PROsport-Racing	Aston Martin Vantage AMR GT4	175	(Liechtenstein) Fabienne Wohlwend	9
(Germany) PROsport-Racing	Aston Martin Vantage AMR GT4	175	(France) Célia Martin	9
(Germany) PROsport-Racing	Aston Martin Vantage AMR GT4	176	(Belgium) Guido Dumarey	1-2, 4, 6-9
(Germany) PROsport-Racing	Aston Martin Vantage AMR GT4	176	(Ukraine) Yevgen Sokolovskiy	1-2, 9
(Germany) PROsport-Racing	Aston Martin Vantage AMR GT4	176	(Czech Republic) Gabriela Jílkova	1
(Germany) PROsport-Racing	Aston Martin Vantage AMR GT4	176	(France) Célia Martin	4, 8
(Germany) PROsport-Racing	Aston Martin Vantage AMR GT4	176	(Germany) Rudi Adams	6-7
(Germany) PROsport-Racing	Aston Martin Vantage AMR GT4	176	(Germany) Michael Hess	6-7
(Germany) Waldow Performance	Mercedes-AMG GT4	177	(Germany) Janis Waldow	1-2
(Germany) Waldow Performance	Mercedes-AMG GT4	177	(Germany) Moritz Wiskirchen	1-2
(Germany) Waldow Performance	Mercedes-AMG GT4	177	(Turkey) Ersin Yücesan	1-2
(Germany) FK Performance Motorsport	BMW M4 GT4	178	(Germany) Christian Konnerth	3, 9
(Germany) FK Performance Motorsport	BMW M4 GT4	178	(New Zealand) Tony Richards	3
(Germany) FK Performance Motorsport	BMW M4 GT4	178	(Netherlands) Maxime Oosten	3
(Germany) FK Performance Motorsport	BMW M4 GT4	178	(Switzerland) Ranko Mijatović	9
(Germany) FK Performance Motorsport	BMW M4 GT4	178	(Germany) Michael Schrey	9
(Germany) FK Performance Motorsport	BMW M4 GT4	178	(Norway) Sindre Setsås	9
(Germany) FK Performance Motorsport	BMW M4 GT4	187	(Germany) Thorsten Wolter	All
(Germany) FK Performance Motorsport	BMW M4 GT4	187	(Germany) Nick Wüstenhagen	All
(Germany) FK Performance Motorsport	BMW M4 GT4	187	(Germany) Michael Schrey	1-2, 8
(Germany) FK Performance Motorsport	BMW M4 GT4	187	(Germany) Nick Hancke	3-4, 6-7, 9
(Germany) FK Performance Motorsport	BMW M4 GT4	187	(Germany) Christian Konnerth	5
(Germany) FK Performance Motorsport	BMW M4 GT4	187	(Belgium) Aris Balanian	6-7
(Germany) Teichmann Racing	Toyota GR Supra GT4	180	(Germany) Stephan Brodmerkel	1-3, 8-9
(Germany) Teichmann Racing	Toyota GR Supra GT4	180	(Austria) Constantin Schöll	1-3, 8-9
(Germany) Teichmann Racing	Toyota GR Supra GT4	180	(Germany) Hendrik Still	1, 3, 8-9
(Germany) Teichmann Racing	Toyota GR Supra GT4	190	(United Kingdom) Scott Marshall	1-4, 6
(Germany) Teichmann Racing	Toyota GR Supra GT4	190	(Germany) Georg Griesemann	1-2
(Germany) Teichmann Racing	Toyota GR Supra GT4	190	(Germany) Yves Volte	1-2
(Germany) Teichmann Racing	Toyota GR Supra GT4	190	(Germany) Felix von der Laden	3
(Germany) Teichmann Racing	Toyota GR Supra GT4	190	(Austria) Constantin Schöll	4, 6
(Germany) Teichmann Racing	Toyota GR Supra GT4	190	(Germany) Stephan Brodmerkel	6
(Germany) Teichmann Racing	Toyota GR Supra GT4	190	(Germany) Roland Fröse	6
(Germany) Haupt Racing Team	Mercedes-AMG GT4	189	(Germany) Tobias Wahl	1-4
(Germany) Haupt Racing Team	Mercedes-AMG GT4	189	(Germany) Reinhold Renger	1-4
(Germany) Haupt Racing Team	Mercedes-AMG GT4	189	(Germany) Tim-Florian Wahl	4
(Germany) Walkenhorst Motorsport	BMW M4 GT4	191	(Belgium) Aris Balanian	1-5, 8
(Germany) Walkenhorst Motorsport	BMW M4 GT4	191	(Germany) Florian Weber	1-5
(Germany) Walkenhorst Motorsport	BMW M4 GT4	191	(United States) Ace Robey	1-2, 4-5
(Germany) Walkenhorst Motorsport	BMW M4 GT4	191	(Germany) Bennet Ehrl	8
	BMW M4 GT4	193	(Romania) Alexandru Vasilescu	4
SP8
(Japan) Team HAL	Lexus RCF	135	(Japan) Takamitsu Matsui	6
(Japan) Team HAL	Lexus RCF	135	(Japan) Itoh Masashige	6
(Japan) Team HAL	Lexus RCF	135	(Germany) Klaus Völker	6
SP8T
(Germany) Black Falcon Team Textar	Mercedes-AMG GT4	140	(Germany) Tim-Florian Wahl	6-8
(Germany) Black Falcon Team Textar	Mercedes-AMG GT4	140	(Germany) Reinhold Renger	6-8
(Germany) Black Falcon Team Textar	Mercedes-AMG GT4	140	(Germany) Tobias Wahl	6-8
(Germany) Black Falcon Team Textar	Mercedes-AMG GT4	142	(Germany) Tim-Florian Wahl	9
(Germany) Black Falcon Team Textar	Mercedes-AMG GT4	142	(Germany) Reinhold Renger	9
(Germany) Dörr Motorsport	Aston Martin Vantage GT4	150	(Germany) Ben Dörr	1-3
(Germany) Dörr Motorsport	Aston Martin Vantage GT4	150	(France) Théo Nouet	1-2
(Germany) Dörr Motorsport	Aston Martin Vantage GT4	150	(Germany) Stefan Kenntemich	3
(Germany) Dörr Motorsport	Aston Martin Vantage GT4	150	(Germany) Rudi Adams	3
(Germany) Giti Tire Motorsport by WS Racing	BMW M4 GT4	151	(Germany) Carrie Schreiner	1-2, 8
(Germany) Giti Tire Motorsport by WS Racing	BMW M4 GT4	151	(Netherlands) Beitske Visser	1, 5, 8
(Germany) Giti Tire Motorsport by WS Racing	BMW M4 GT4	151	(Liechtenstein) Fabienne Wohlwend	1, 5
(Germany) Giti Tire Motorsport by WS Racing	BMW M4 GT4	151	(France) Célia Martin	2, 5
(Germany) Giti Tire Motorsport by WS Racing	BMW M4 GT4	151	(United Kingdom) Pippa Mann	2
(Germany) Adrenalin Motorsport Team Motec	BMW M4 GT4	160	(Germany) Lars Harbeck	5, 8-9
(Germany) Adrenalin Motorsport Team Motec	BMW M4 GT4	160	(Germany) Christian Kraus	5, 8-9
(Germany) Adrenalin Motorsport Team Motec	BMW M4 GT4	160	(Germany) Alexander Müller	5, 8-9
(Germany) Adrenalin Motorsport Team Motec	BMW M4 GT4	160	(Switzerland) Michelangelo Comazzi	5, 8-9
SP7
(Germany) RPM Racing	Porsche 991 GT3 Cup	58	(Czech Republic) Milan Kodídek	8
(Germany) RPM Racing	Porsche 991 GT3 Cup	58	(Germany) Tim Breidenbach	8
(Germany) 9und11 Racing	Porsche 991 GT3 Cup	60	(Germany) Georg Goder	5-7, 9
(Germany) 9und11 Racing	Porsche 991 GT3 Cup	60	(Germany) Ralf Öhme	5-7, 9
(Germany) 9und11 Racing	Porsche 991 GT3 Cup	60	(Germany) Martin Schlüter	5-7, 9
(Germany) 9und11 Racing	Porsche 991 GT3 Cup	60	(Germany) Tim Scheerbarth	6-7
(Germany) 9und11 Racing	Porsche 991 GT3 Cup	65	(Germany) Georg Goder	4
(Germany) 9und11 Racing	Porsche 991 GT3 Cup	65	(Germany) Ralf Öhme	4
(Germany) 9und11 Racing	Porsche 991 GT3 Cup	65	(Germany) Martin Schlüter	4
(unnamed) ^{1-4} (Germany) PLUSLINE Racing Team ^{5-9}	Porsche Cayman GT4 CS	63	(Germany) Reiner Neuffer	All
(unnamed) ^{1-4} (Germany) PLUSLINE Racing Team ^{5-9}	Porsche Cayman GT4 CS	63	(Germany) Fabio Sacchi	2-9
(unnamed) ^{1-4} (Germany) PLUSLINE Racing Team ^{5-9}	Porsche Cayman GT4 CS	63	(Germany) Christian Knötschke	5
(Germany) Teichmann Racing	Porsche 911 GT3 Cup	67	(Norway) Torleif Nytroen	8-9
(Germany) KKrämer Racing	Porsche 718 Cayman GT4 Clubsport	974	(Germany) Heinz Dolfen	1
(Germany) KKrämer Racing	Porsche 718 Cayman GT4 Clubsport	974	(Germany) Olaf Baunack	1
(Germany) KKrämer Racing	Porsche 718 Cayman GT4 Clubsport	974	(Germany) Karl-Heinz Meyer	1
SP6
	BMW M3	206	(United Kingdom) "Dave"	6-7
	BMW M3	206	(United Kingdom) "Joe"	6-7
	BMW M3	206	(Australia) "Rick"	6-7
SP4T
(Germany) Smyrlis Racing	Porsche 718 Cayman GTS	260	(Germany) Guido Heinrich	All
(Germany) Smyrlis Racing	Porsche 718 Cayman GTS	260	(Germany) Fabian Peitzmeier	All
(Germany) Smyrlis Racing	Porsche 718 Cayman GTS	260	(Germany) Roland Fröse	4-6
(Germany) Smyrlis Racing	Porsche 718 Cayman GTS	260	(Germany) Anton Ruf	7, 9
(Germany) Smyrlis Racing	Porsche 718 Cayman GTS	260	(Germany) Daniel Rexhausen	7
(Japan) STI	Subaru WRX	263	(Netherlands) Carlo van Dam	3
(Japan) STI	Subaru WRX	263	(Germany) Tim Schrick	3
(Belgium) HYRacing-AMC Sankt Vith	Porsche 718 Cayman GTS	266	(Belgium) "Brody"	1-8
(Belgium) HYRacing-AMC Sankt Vith	Porsche 718 Cayman GTS	266	(Belgium) Jacques Derenne	1-8
(Belgium) HYRacing-AMC Sankt Vith	Porsche 718 Cayman GTS	266	(Italy) Bruno Barbaro	1-2, 5
(Belgium) HYRacing-AMC Sankt Vith	Porsche 718 Cayman GTS	266	(Belgium) Olivier Muytjens	2-4, 6-7
(Belgium) HYRacing-AMC Sankt Vith	Porsche 718 Cayman GTS	266	(Germany) Harald Rettich	7
SP4
(Germany) MSG Bayerischer Wald Hutthurm e.V. im ADAC	BMW 325i	250	(Germany) Jörg Schönfelder	1, 3, 5
(Germany) MSG Bayerischer Wald Hutthurm e.V. im ADAC	BMW 325i	250	(Germany) Serge van Vooren	1, 4-5
(Germany) MSG Bayerischer Wald Hutthurm e.V. im ADAC	BMW 325i	250	(Germany) Christian Schotte	3-5
(Germany) Dürener MSC e.V. im ADAC	BMW 325i	252	(Germany) Bernd Küpper	2
(Germany) Dürener MSC e.V. im ADAC	BMW 325i	252	(Germany) Kevin Küpper	2
(Germany) Dürener MSC e.V. im ADAC	BMW 325i	252	(Germany) Joseph Moore	2
	BMW 325i	254	(Germany) Thorsten Köppert	3-7
	BMW 325i	254	(Germany) Ingo Öpen	3, 5, 7
	BMW 325i	254	(Germany) Henrik Launhardt	4, 6-7
	BMW 325i	254	(Germany) Ralph Hengesbach	4, 6
	BMW 325i	254	(Germany) Klaus Müller	5
SP3T
(Germany) Max Kruse Racing	Volkswagen Golf VII	10	(Turkey) Emir Asari	All
(Germany) Max Kruse Racing	Volkswagen Golf VII	10	(Germany) Matthias Wasel	1-8
(Germany) Max Kruse Racing	Volkswagen Golf VII	10	(Germany) Heiko Hammel	1, 3-5, 9
(Germany) Max Kruse Racing	Volkswagen Golf VII	10	(Germany) Timo Hochwind	6-8
(Germany) Max Kruse Racing	Volkswagen Golf VII	10	(United States) Andrew Engelmann	9
(Germany) MSC Sinzig e.V. im ADAC	Audi TT	300	(Germany) Rudi Speich	3
(Germany) MSC Sinzig e.V. im ADAC	Audi TT	300	(Germany) Roland Waschkau	3
(Germany) MSC Kempenich e.V. im ADAC asBest RACING	SEAT León Cup Racer	303	(Germany) Kim Berwanger	5
(Germany) MSC Kempenich e.V. im ADAC asBest RACING	SEAT León Cup Racer	303	(Germany) Roland Schmid	5
(Germany) MSC Kempenich e.V. im ADAC asBest RACING	SEAT León Cup Racer	303	(Germany) Jens Wulf	6, 8-9
(Germany) MSC Kempenich e.V. im ADAC asBest RACING	SEAT León Cup Racer	303	(Germany) Meik Utsch	6, 8-9
(Germany) MSC Kempenich e.V. im ADAC asBest RACING	SEAT León Cup Racer	303	(Germany) Lucas Waltermann	6
(Germany) MSC Kempenich e.V. im ADAC asBest RACING	SEAT León Cup Racer	303	(Germany) Philipp Eis	6
(Germany) MSC Kempenich e.V. im ADAC asBest RACING	SEAT León Cup Racer	303	(Jordan) Nadir Zuhour	8
(Germany) MSC Kempenich e.V. im ADAC asBest RACING	SEAT León Cup Racer	303	(Germany) Sebastian Schemmann	9
	SEAT León Cup Racer	319	(Germany) Jörg Kittelmann	5
	SEAT León Cup Racer	319	(Argentina) Marcos Adolfo Vázquez	5
(Germany) Schmickler Performance powered by Ravenol ^{1, 3-8} (Germany) Schmickler Performance ^{2}	Porsche Cayman 982	333	(Germany) Claudius Karch	1-6, 8-9
(Germany) Schmickler Performance powered by Ravenol ^{1, 3-8} (Germany) Schmickler Performance ^{2}	Porsche Cayman 982	333	(Germany) Achim Wawer	1-6, 9
(Germany) Schmickler Performance powered by Ravenol ^{1, 3-8} (Germany) Schmickler Performance ^{2}	Porsche Cayman 982	333	(Germany) Carsten Knechtges	1-5
(Germany) Schmickler Performance powered by Ravenol ^{1, 3-8} (Germany) Schmickler Performance ^{2}	Porsche Cayman 982	333	(Germany) Kai Riemer	6
(Germany) Schmickler Performance powered by Ravenol ^{1, 3-8} (Germany) Schmickler Performance ^{2}	Porsche Cayman 982	333	(Germany) Volker Wawer	8
SP3
(Germany) MSC Adenau e.V. im ADAC ^{2-3, 5-6} (unnamed) ^{4}	Renault Clio 3 Cup	270	(Germany) Stephan Epp	2-6
(Germany) MSC Adenau e.V. im ADAC ^{2-3, 5-6} (unnamed) ^{4}	Renault Clio 3 Cup	270	(Germany) Michael Ülwer	2-6
(Germany) MSC Adenau e.V. im ADAC ^{2-3, 5-6} (unnamed) ^{4}	Renault Clio 3 Cup	270	(Germany) Timo Kaatz	2-6
	Toyota GT86	273	(Germany) Benjamin Zerfeld	3
	Toyota GT86	273	(Romania) Theodor Devolescu	3
	Renault Clio 3 Cup	276	(Armenia) Roman Mavlanov	1-3
	Renault Clio 3 Cup	276	(Belgium) Gilles Magnus	1, 3
	Renault Clio 3 Cup	276	(Germany) Lorenz Stegmann	2-3
	Renault Clio 3 Cup	276	(Germany) Bernd Strenge	2
	Dacia Logan	281	(Germany) Oliver Kriese	1-3
	Dacia Logan	281	(Germany) Maximilian Weissermel	1-2
	Dacia Logan	281	(Germany) Thomas Geilen	2
	Dacia Logan	281	(Germany) Michael Lachmayer	3
	Renault Clio 3 RS Cup	282	(Germany) Goedicke Holger	8
	Renault Clio 3 RS Cup	282	(Germany) Lukas Krämer	8
(Japan) Team HAL	Toyota GT86	284	(Japan) Masato Mitsuhashi	2, 4
(Japan) Team HAL	Toyota GT86	284	(Japan) Rintaro Kubo	2, 4
(Japan) Team HAL	Toyota GT86	284	(Japan) Yoshikazu Sobu	2
(Hungary) Car Competition Racing Team	Toyota GT86 CS Cup	286	(Hungary) Adam Lengyel	1-7
(Hungary) Car Competition Racing Team	Toyota GT86 CS Cup	286	(Hungary) Bendeguz Molnar	1-7
SP2T
(Switzerland) Team Rallye Top	Peugeot RCZ Cup	385	(Switzerland) Max Langenegger	5
(Switzerland) Team Rallye Top	Peugeot RCZ Cup	385	(Switzerland) Bernhard Badertscher	5
AT(-G)
(Germany) Four Motors Bioconcept-Car	Porsche 911 GT3 Cup	320	(Denmark) Henrik Bollerslev	2-3, 5-7
(Germany) Four Motors Bioconcept-Car	Porsche 911 GT3 Cup	320	(Germany) Thomas Kiefer	2-3, 5-7
(Germany) Four Motors Bioconcept-Car	Porsche 911 GT3 Cup	320	(Germany) "Tom"	2-3, 5-7
(Germany) Four Motors Bioconcept-Car	Porsche 911 GT3 Cup	320	(Germany) "Smudo"	2-3, 6-7
(Germany) Four Motors Bioconcept-Car	Porsche 718 Cayman GT4 Clubsport	420	(Germany) Matthias Beckwermert	2-3, 5-7
(Germany) Four Motors Bioconcept-Car	Porsche 718 Cayman GT4 Clubsport	420	(Germany) Oliver Sprungmann	2-3, 5-7
(Germany) Four Motors Bioconcept-Car	Porsche 718 Cayman GT4 Clubsport	420	(Netherlands) Maxime Oosten	2
(Germany) Four Motors Bioconcept-Car	Porsche 718 Cayman GT4 Clubsport	420	(Germany) Karl Pflanz	3, 5-7
(Germany) Four Motors Bioconcept-Car	Porsche 718 Cayman GT4 Clubsport	420	(Switzerland) Luca Veronelli	5-7
(Germany) Four Motors Bioconcept-Car	Porsche 718 Cayman GT4 Clubsport	420	(Brazil) Felipe Nasr	8
(Germany) Four Motors Bioconcept-Car	Porsche 718 Cayman GT4 Clubsport	420	(Germany) Alesia Kreutzpointner	8
(Germany) Four Motors Bioconcept-Car	Porsche 718 Cayman GT4 Clubsport	420	(Germany) Jacqueline Kreutzpointner	8
(Germany) Four Motors Bioconcept-Car	Porsche 718 Cayman GT4 Clubsport	420	(Germany) David Beckmann	9
(Germany) Four Motors Bioconcept-Car	Porsche 718 Cayman GT4 Clubsport	420	(Denmark) Bastian Buus	9
(Germany) Four Motors Bioconcept-Car	Porsche 718 Cayman GT4 Clubsport	633	(Switzerland) Marc Schöni	2-3, 5-7
(Germany) Four Motors Bioconcept-Car	Porsche 718 Cayman GT4 Clubsport	633	(United Kingdom) "Matt"	2-3
(Germany) Four Motors Bioconcept-Car	Porsche 718 Cayman GT4 Clubsport	633	(Germany) David Beckmann	2
(Germany) Four Motors Bioconcept-Car	Porsche 718 Cayman GT4 Clubsport	633	(Denmark) Bastian Buus	3
(Germany) Four Motors Bioconcept-Car	Porsche 718 Cayman GT4 Clubsport	633	(Switzerland) Marco Antonio Timbal	5-7
(Germany) Four Motors Bioconcept-Car	Porsche 718 Cayman GT4 Clubsport	633	(Germany) Christoph Hewer	5
(Germany) Four Motors Bioconcept-Car	Porsche 718 Cayman GT4 Clubsport	633	(Switzerland) Ivan Reggiani	5
(Germany) Four Motors Bioconcept-Car	Porsche 718 Cayman GT4 Clubsport	633	(Germany) Henning Cramer	6-7
(Germany) Griesemann Gruppe by TR Team	Toyota Supra GT4	635	(Germany) Georg Griesemann	6-7
(Germany) Griesemann Gruppe by TR Team	Toyota Supra GT4	635	(Germany) Yves Volte	6-7
(Germany) Griesemann Gruppe by TR Team	Toyota Supra GT4	635	(Germany) Björn Griesemann	7
	Subaru BRZ RR-AT	636	(Germany) Tim Schrick	3, 9
	Subaru BRZ RR-AT	636	(Germany) Lucian Gavris	3, 9

=== TCR ===
Team	Car	No.	Drivers	Rounds
(Germany) MSC Emstal e.V. im ADAC	Volkswagen Golf GTI TCR	800	(Germany) Sebastian Schemmann	6, 9
(Germany) MSC Emstal e.V. im ADAC	Volkswagen Golf GTI TCR	800	(Italy) Florian Haller	6, 9
(Germany) MSC Emstal e.V. im ADAC	Volkswagen Golf GTI TCR	800	(Italy) Daniel Fink	6, 9
(Norway) Møller Bil Motorsport	Audi RS 3 LMS TCR	801	(Norway) Håkon Schjærin	3-5, 8-9
(Norway) Møller Bil Motorsport	Audi RS 3 LMS TCR	801	(Norway) Kenneth Østvold	3-5, 8-9
(Norway) Møller Bil Motorsport	Audi RS 3 LMS TCR	801	(Norway) Atle Gulbrandsen	3
(Norway) Møller Bil Motorsport	Audi RS 3 LMS TCR	801	(Norway) Anders Lindstad	4-5, 8-9
	Opel Astra	802	(France) Jean-Philippe Imparato	3
	Opel Astra	802	(France) Francois Wales	3
	Opel Astra	802	(Germany) Tobias Jung	5
	Opel Astra	802	(Germany) Michael Eichhorn	5
	Opel Astra	802	(France) Jean-Marc Finot	8
	Opel Astra	802	(France) Carlos Antunes Tavares	8
(Germany) Halder Motorsport	Honda FK7 TCR	807	(Switzerland) Roger Vögeli	1-3, 6-8
(Germany) Halder Motorsport	Honda FK7 TCR	807	(Germany) Mike Halder	1-3, 6-8
(Germany) Halder Motorsport	Honda FK7 TCR	807	(Denmark) Nicolai Sylvest	1
(Germany) Halder Motorsport	Honda FK7 TCR	807	(Germany) Michelle Halder	2-3, 6-8
(unnamed) ^{1} (Germany) MSC Kempenich e.V. im ADAC asBest RACING ^{2-5}	Cupra TCR	808	(Germany) Meik Utsch	1-5
(unnamed) ^{1} (Germany) MSC Kempenich e.V. im ADAC asBest RACING ^{2-5}	Cupra TCR	808	(Germany) Jens Wulf	1-2, 4-5
(unnamed) ^{1} (Germany) MSC Kempenich e.V. im ADAC asBest RACING ^{2-5}	Cupra TCR	808	(Switzerland) Roland Schmid	1, 3
(unnamed) ^{1} (Germany) MSC Kempenich e.V. im ADAC asBest RACING ^{2-5}	Cupra TCR	808	(Germany) Philipp Eis	2
(unnamed) ^{1} (Germany) MSC Kempenich e.V. im ADAC asBest RACING ^{2-5}	Cupra TCR	808	(Germany) Andreas Tasche	3
(unnamed) ^{1} (Germany) MSC Kempenich e.V. im ADAC asBest RACING ^{2-5}	Cupra TCR	808	(Germany) Kim Berwanger	4
(unnamed) ^{1} (Germany) MSC Kempenich e.V. im ADAC asBest RACING ^{2-5}	Cupra TCR	808	(Germany) Sebastian Schemmann	5
(unnamed) ^{1} (Germany) MSC Kempenich e.V. im ADAC asBest RACING ^{2-5}	Cupra TCR	808	(Germany) Florian Haller	5
	Cupra TCR	811	(Italy) Armando Stanco	3-4, 9
	Cupra TCR	811	(Italy) Dario Stanco	3-4, 9
	Volkswagen Golf VII TCR	820	(Germany) Marco Knappmeier	1-2
	Volkswagen Golf VII TCR	820	(Germany) Dirk Groneck	1-2
	Volkswagen Golf VII TCR	820	(Germany) Achim Johanns	1
	Volkswagen Golf VII TCR	820	(Germany) Tim Groneck	2
	Volkswagen Golf VII TCR	822	(Germany) Marco Knappmeier	2-3
	Volkswagen Golf VII TCR	822	(Germany) Dirk Groneck	2-3
	Volkswagen Golf VII TCR	822	(Germany) Maik Knappmeier	2-3
	Volkswagen Golf VII TCR	822	(Germany) Achim Johanns	2
	Audi RS 3 LMS TCR	821	(Germany) Jens Wulf	3
	Audi RS 3 LMS TCR	821	(Germany) Volker Garrn	3
(Germany) JP Motorsport (Vortex Competition)	Cupra TCR	827	(Luxembourg) Patryk Krupinski	6
(Germany) JP Motorsport (Vortex Competition)	Cupra TCR	827	(Austria) Christian Klien	6
	Audi RS 3 LMS TCR	833	(Germany) Mathias Schläppi	2
	Audi RS 3 LMS TCR	833	(Germany) Stephan Epp	2

=== NLS production cars ===
Team	Car	No.	Drivers	Rounds
V6
(Germany) Adrenalin Motorsport Team Motec	Porsche Cayman S	396	(Germany) Lutz Rühl	All
(Germany) Adrenalin Motorsport Team Motec	Porsche Cayman S	396	(Germany) Christian Büllesbach	All
(Germany) Adrenalin Motorsport Team Motec	Porsche Cayman S	396	(Germany) Andreas Schettler	All
(Germany) Adrenalin Motorsport Team Motec	Porsche Cayman S	396	(Germany) Daniel Zils	All
(Germany) Schmickler Performance powered by Ravenol	Porsche 911	400	(Germany) Christian Heuchemer	3, 5-6, 8
(Germany) Schmickler Performance powered by Ravenol	Porsche 911	400	(Germany) Thomas Heuchemer	3, 5-6, 8
(Germany) Schmickler Performance powered by Ravenol	Porsche 911	400	(Germany) Sascha Kloft	3
(Germany) Schmickler Performance powered by Ravenol	Porsche 911	400	(Germany) Albert Egbert	5, 8
(Germany) Schmickler Performance powered by Ravenol	Porsche 911	400	(Germany) Carl-Leonard Glinz	6, 9
(Germany) Schmickler Performance powered by Ravenol	Porsche 911	400	(Germany) Michael Frigge	9
(Germany) MSC Adenau e.V. im ADAC	Porsche Cayman S ^{1} Porsche Cayman GTS ^{2,4-9}	410	(Germany) David Ackermann	1-2, 4-5, 8-9
(Germany) MSC Adenau e.V. im ADAC	Porsche Cayman S ^{1} Porsche Cayman GTS ^{2,4-9}	410	(Italy) Aleardo Bertelli	1, 4, 8-9
(Germany) MSC Adenau e.V. im ADAC	Porsche Cayman S ^{1} Porsche Cayman GTS ^{2,4-9}	410	(Italy) Stefano Croci	1, 4, 8-9
(Germany) MSC Adenau e.V. im ADAC	Porsche Cayman S ^{1} Porsche Cayman GTS ^{2,4-9}	410	(Thailand) Akkarapong Akkaneenirot	2
(Germany) MSC Adenau e.V. im ADAC	Porsche Cayman S ^{1} Porsche Cayman GTS ^{2,4-9}	410	(Thailand) Kris Vasuratna	2
(Germany) MSC Adenau e.V. im ADAC	Porsche Cayman S ^{1} Porsche Cayman GTS ^{2,4-9}	410	(Italy) Graziano Grazzini	4, 8
(Germany) MSC Adenau e.V. im ADAC	Porsche Cayman S ^{1} Porsche Cayman GTS ^{2,4-9}	410	(Germany) Stefan Müller	5
(Germany) MSC Adenau e.V. im ADAC	Porsche Cayman S ^{1} Porsche Cayman GTS ^{2,4-9}	410	(United Kingdom) Scott Marshall	5
(Germany) MSC Adenau e.V. im ADAC	Porsche Cayman S ^{1} Porsche Cayman GTS ^{2,4-9}	410	(Germany) Axel Jahn	5
(Germany) MSC Adenau e.V. im ADAC	Porsche Cayman S ^{1} Porsche Cayman GTS ^{2,4-9}	410	(Mexico) Juan Carlos Carmona Chavez	9
	Porsche 911	416	(Germany) Alexander Köppen	3, 6
	Porsche 911	416	(Germany) Sebastian Rings	3, 6
	Porsche 911	416	(Poland) Jacek Pydys	3
	Porsche 911	416	(Germany) Andreas Schaflitzl	6
(Germany) SRS Team Sorg Rennsport	Porsche Cayman S	418	(Australia) Cesar Mendieta	3
(Germany) SRS Team Sorg Rennsport	Porsche Cayman S	418	(France) Joel Le Bihan	3
(Germany) SRS Team Sorg Rennsport	Porsche Cayman S	418	(France) Fabrice Reicher	3
V5
(Germany) QTQ-raceperformance	Porsche Cayman	440	(Germany) Florian Ebener	2-3, 5
(Germany) QTQ-raceperformance	Porsche Cayman	440	(United States) Danny Soufi	2-3
(Germany) QTQ-raceperformance	Porsche Cayman	440	(Belgium) Gilles Magnus	2-3
(Germany) QTQ-raceperformance	Porsche Cayman	440	(Romania) Theodor Devolescu	5
(Germany) QTQ-raceperformance	Porsche Cayman	440	(South Africa) Mikaeel Pitamber	5
(Germany) Adrenalin Motorsport Team Motec	Porsche Cayman	444	(Germany) Ulrich Korn	All
(Germany) Adrenalin Motorsport Team Motec	Porsche Cayman	444	(Germany) Tobias Korn	All
(Germany) Adrenalin Motorsport Team Motec	Porsche Cayman	444	(Germany) Daniel Korn	All
(Germany) Adrenalin Motorsport Team Motec	Porsche Cayman	444	(Ukraine) Ivan Peklin	5
(Germany) Adrenalin Motorsport Team Motec	Porsche Cayman	444	(United States) Michael Skeen	6-7
(Germany) MSC Adenau e.V. im ADAC	Porsche Cayman	445	(Germany) Jérôme Larbi	1-6, 8
(Germany) MSC Adenau e.V. im ADAC	Porsche Cayman	445	(Germany) Holger Gachot	1-5
(Germany) MSC Adenau e.V. im ADAC	Porsche Cayman	445	(Germany) Sophia Gachot	1-2, 6
(Germany) MSC Adenau e.V. im ADAC	Porsche Cayman	445	(Germany) Axel Jahn	3-4, 6
(Germany) MSC Adenau e.V. im ADAC	Porsche Cayman	445	(Germany) Philip Ade	5-6
(Germany) MSC Adenau e.V. im ADAC	Porsche Cayman	445	(Germany) Robert Hinzer	5
(Germany) MSC Adenau e.V. im ADAC	Porsche Cayman	445	(Germany) David Ackermann	8
	Porsche Cayman	446	(Germany) Benedikt Höpfer	8-9
	Porsche Cayman	446	(Poland) Jacek Pydys	8-9
	Porsche Cayman	446	(Germany) Marcel Haas	8-9
	Porsche Cayman	446	(Germany) Stefan Gaukler	8
	Porsche Cayman	446	(Germany) Tassilo Zumpe	9
	Porsche Cayman	447	(Germany) Christoph Ruhrmann	2
	Porsche Cayman	447	(Germany) Gerd Grundmann	2
	Porsche Cayman	447	(Germany) Manfred Weber	2
	BMW E36 M3	448	(United Kingdom) Simon Glenn	5-6
	BMW E36 M3	448	(United Kingdom) Jody Halse	5-6
(Germany) W&S Motorsport	Porsche Cayman	450	(Germany) Andreas Müller	8-9
(Germany) W&S Motorsport	Porsche Cayman	450	(Bulgaria) Stefan Bostandjiev	8
(Germany) W&S Motorsport	Porsche Cayman	450	(Germany) Peter Siebert	9
(Denmark) Team Young KRS Danes ^{2} (unnamed) ^{3}	Porsche Cayman	456	(Denmark) Felix Hahne	2-3
(Denmark) Team Young KRS Danes ^{2} (unnamed) ^{3}	Porsche Cayman	456	(Denmark) Nicolaj Kandborg	2-3
V4
(Germany) RPM Racing	BMW 325i	700	(Canada) Samantha Tan	3
(Germany) RPM Racing	BMW 325i	700	(Germany) Philip Hamprecht	3
(Germany) QTQ-Raceperformance	BMW 325i	702	(Germany) Oliver Frisse	All
(Germany) QTQ-Raceperformance	BMW 325i	702	(Germany) Danny Brink	All
(Germany) QTQ-Raceperformance	BMW 325i	702	(Germany) Jürgen Huber	All
(Germany) QTQ-Raceperformance	BMW 325i	703	(Germany) Fritz Hebig	9
(Germany) QTQ-Raceperformance	BMW 325i	703	(Germany) Peter Elkmann	9
	BMW 325i	711	(Germany) Desiree Müller	1-7, 9
	BMW 325i	711	(Germany) Philipp Romboy	1-3, 6-7
	BMW 325i	711	(Germany) Henning Hausmeier	1, 3, 9
	BMW 325i	711	(Germany) Richard Gresek	4
	BMW 325i	711	(Switzerland) Philipp Hagnauer	5
	BMW 325i	711	(United Kingdom) Bradley Philpot	5
	BMW 325i	711	(Brazil) Flavia Pellegrino Fernandes	5
	BMW 325i	711	(Germany) Tim Lukas Müller	6-7, 9
	BMW 325i	729	(Germany) Reiner Thomas	3, 5-7
	BMW 325i	729	(Germany) Manfred Schmitz	3, 5-7
	BMW 325i	729	(Germany) Nico Hantke	3, 5
	BMW 325i	729	(Germany) Katja Thomas	5-7
	BMW 325i	730	(Finland) Juha Miettinen	All
	BMW 325i	730	(Sweden) Dan Berghult	All
	BMW 325i	730	(Brazil) Flavia Pellegrino Fernandes	6-7, 9
	BMW 325i	730	(Sweden) Jonas Nilsson	8
	BMW 325i	731	(Germany) Romano Schultz	9
	BMW 325i	731	(Germany) Florian Kramer	9
(Germany) Dr. Dr. Stein Tveten Motorsport	BMW 325i	733	(Norway) Dr. Dr. Stein Tveten	9
(Germany) MSC Kempenich e.V. im ADAC asBest Racing ^{4} (Germany) Up2race ^{9}	BMW 325i	735	(Germany) Niklas Walter	4, 9
(Germany) MSC Kempenich e.V. im ADAC asBest Racing ^{4} (Germany) Up2race ^{9}	BMW 325i	735	(Germany) Richard Schäfer	4, 9
(Germany) MSC Kempenich e.V. im ADAC asBest Racing ^{4} (Germany) Up2race ^{9}	BMW 325i	735	(Germany) Dennis Surace	4
(Germany) SFG Schönau e.V. im ADAC	BMW 325i	740	(Germany) Dominik Schöning	2, 9
(Germany) SFG Schönau e.V. im ADAC	BMW 325i	740	(Germany) Roman Schiemenz	2, 9
	BMW 325i	747	(United Kingdom) Benjamin Lyons	9
	BMW 325i	747	(Germany) Markus Löw	9
	BMW 325i	750	(United Kingdom) Frank Bird	2
	BMW 325i	750	(Italy) Fabio Citignola	2
	BMW 325i	750	(Argentina) Marcos Adolfo Vázquez	2
	BMW 325i	750	(Slovenia) Jure Zove	6
	BMW 325i	750	(Germany) Serge van Vooren	6
	BMW 325i	750	(Germany) Jörg Schönfelder	6
	BMW 325i	750	(Brazil) Flavia Pellegrino Fernandes	8
	BMW 325i	750	(Germany) Niklas Walter	8
	BMW 325i	750	(Germany) Arvid Thal	8
(Germany) Manheller Racing	BMW E90	760	(Germany) Manfred Röss	5, 8-9
(Germany) Manheller Racing	BMW E90	760	(Germany) Matthias Röss	5, 8-9
(Germany) Manheller Racing	BMW E90	760	(Germany) Malte Tack	5, 8-9
VT3
(Germany) Team Mathol Racing e.V.	Porsche 718 Cayman S	474	(Argentina) Marcos Adolfo Vázquez	1-6
(Germany) Team Mathol Racing e.V.	Porsche 718 Cayman S	474	(Germany) Theo Oeverhaus	1-3
(Germany) Team Mathol Racing e.V.	Porsche 718 Cayman S	474	(Argentina) "Coco"	1
(Germany) Team Mathol Racing e.V.	Porsche 718 Cayman S	474	(Germany) Alex Fielenbach	1
(Germany) Team Mathol Racing e.V.	Porsche 718 Cayman S	474	(United Kingdom) Frank Bird	2-3
(Germany) Team Mathol Racing e.V.	Porsche 718 Cayman S	474	(Germany) Erik Braun	4-6
(Germany) Team Mathol Racing e.V.	Porsche 718 Cayman S	474	(Germany) Maximilian Schmidt	4-6
(Germany) MSC Adenau e.V. im ADAC	Porsche Cayman GTS	460	(Sweden) Eric Ullström	6
(Germany) MSC Adenau e.V. im ADAC	Porsche Cayman GTS	460	(Switzerland) Alexander Walker	6
	BMW M2 N55	461	(Germany) Sebastian Tauber	4, 9
	BMW M2 N55	461	(Switzerland) Dominic Kulpowicz	4, 9
	Cupra Leon	464	(Germany) Tobias Jung	8
	Cupra Leon	464	(Germany) Michael Eichhorn	8
VT2-FWD
(Germany) Walkenhorst Motorsport	Hyundai i30N	466	(Belgium) Jarno D'Hauw	1-3
(Germany) Walkenhorst Motorsport	Hyundai i30N	466	(Monaco) Micah Stanley	1
(Germany) Walkenhorst Motorsport	Hyundai i30N	466	(United Kingdom) James Kell	2-3
(Germany) Walkenhorst Motorsport	Hyundai i30N	466	(United States) Tazio Ottis	2
(Germany) Walkenhorst Motorsport	Hyundai i30N	466	(Brazil) Flavia Pellegrino Fernandes	3-4
(Germany) Walkenhorst Motorsport	Hyundai i30N	466	(Germany) Bennet Ehrl	4
(Germany) Walkenhorst Motorsport	Hyundai i30N	466	(United States) Dev Gore	5-7
(Germany) Walkenhorst Motorsport	Hyundai i30N	466	(France) Lucas Frayssinet	5-7
(Germany) Walkenhorst Motorsport	Hyundai i30N	466	(Venezuela) Manuel Maldonado	5-7
(Germany) Walkenhorst Motorsport	Hyundai i30N	470	(United Kingdom) Bailey Voisin	2, 4, 9
(Germany) Walkenhorst Motorsport	Hyundai i30N	470	(United Kingdom) Alex Connor	2, 4
(Germany) Walkenhorst Motorsport	Hyundai i30N	470	(Monaco) Micah Stanley	2
(Germany) Walkenhorst Motorsport	Hyundai i30N	470	(United Kingdom) Ben Barnicoat	2
(Germany) Walkenhorst Motorsport	Hyundai i30N	470	(Germany) Bennet Ehrl	5-7
(Germany) Walkenhorst Motorsport	Hyundai i30N	470	(United States) Tazio Ottis	5, 8
(Germany) Walkenhorst Motorsport	Hyundai i30N	470	(United Kingdom) James Kell	5
(Germany) Walkenhorst Motorsport	Hyundai i30N	470	(South Korea) "MJ LIM"	6-7
(Germany) Walkenhorst Motorsport	Hyundai i30N	470	(Germany) Nico Hantke	8
(Germany) Walkenhorst Motorsport	Hyundai i30N	470	(United States) Dev Gore	8
(Germany) Walkenhorst Motorsport	Hyundai i30N	470	(Venezuela) Manuel Maldonado	9
(Germany) Walkenhorst Motorsport	Hyundai i30N	470	(United Kingdom) Jack Aitken	9
(unnamed) ^{1} (Germany) MSC Kempenich e.V. im ADAC asBest Racing ^{2-9}	Volkswagen Golf V GTI	467	(Germany) Robert Neumann	1, 4
(unnamed) ^{1} (Germany) MSC Kempenich e.V. im ADAC asBest Racing ^{2-9}	Volkswagen Golf V GTI	467	(Germany) Dennis Leißing	1
(unnamed) ^{1} (Germany) MSC Kempenich e.V. im ADAC asBest Racing ^{2-9}	Volkswagen Golf V GTI	467	(Germany) Maximilian Weissermel	1
(unnamed) ^{1} (Germany) MSC Kempenich e.V. im ADAC asBest Racing ^{2-9}	Volkswagen Golf V GTI	467	(Germany) Carlo Scholl	2
(unnamed) ^{1} (Germany) MSC Kempenich e.V. im ADAC asBest Racing ^{2-9}	Volkswagen Golf V GTI	467	(Germany) Martin Heidrich	2
(unnamed) ^{1} (Germany) MSC Kempenich e.V. im ADAC asBest Racing ^{2-9}	Volkswagen Golf V GTI	467	(Brazil) Flavia Pellegrino Fernandes	2
(unnamed) ^{1} (Germany) MSC Kempenich e.V. im ADAC asBest Racing ^{2-9}	Volkswagen Golf V GTI	467	(Germany) Richard Bäther	4-5
(unnamed) ^{1} (Germany) MSC Kempenich e.V. im ADAC asBest Racing ^{2-9}	Volkswagen Golf V GTI	467	(Germany) Etienne Ploenes	5, 9
(unnamed) ^{1} (Germany) MSC Kempenich e.V. im ADAC asBest Racing ^{2-9}	Volkswagen Golf V GTI	467	(Germany) Georg Kiefer	5, 9
(unnamed) ^{1} (Germany) MSC Kempenich e.V. im ADAC asBest Racing ^{2-9}	Volkswagen Scirocco	477	(Germany) Thomas Ehrhardt	1, 3-5
(unnamed) ^{1} (Germany) MSC Kempenich e.V. im ADAC asBest Racing ^{2-9}	Volkswagen Scirocco	477	(Germany) Niklas Ehrhardt	1, 3-5
(unnamed) ^{1} (Germany) MSC Kempenich e.V. im ADAC asBest Racing ^{2-9}	Volkswagen Scirocco	477	(Germany) Philipp Eis	1, 3
(unnamed) ^{1} (Germany) MSC Kempenich e.V. im ADAC asBest Racing ^{2-9}	Volkswagen Scirocco	477	(Germany) Christian Koger	5-6
(unnamed) ^{1} (Germany) MSC Kempenich e.V. im ADAC asBest Racing ^{2-9}	Volkswagen Scirocco	477	(Germany) Joachim Rabe	6
(unnamed) ^{1} (Germany) MSC Kempenich e.V. im ADAC asBest Racing ^{2-9}	Volkswagen Scirocco	477	(Switzerland) Kevin Gschwind	6
(unnamed) ^{1} (Germany) MSC Kempenich e.V. im ADAC asBest Racing ^{2-9}	Volkswagen Scirocco	477	(Switzerland) Peter Baumann	6
(unnamed) ^{1} (Germany) MSC Kempenich e.V. im ADAC asBest Racing ^{2-9}	Volkswagen Scirocco	477	(Germany) Maik Knappmeier	8
(unnamed) ^{1} (Germany) MSC Kempenich e.V. im ADAC asBest Racing ^{2-9}	Volkswagen Scirocco	477	(Germany) Roman Schiemenz	8
(unnamed) ^{1} (Germany) MSC Kempenich e.V. im ADAC asBest Racing ^{2-9}	Volkswagen Scirocco	477	(Germany) Robert Neumann	8
(Germany) Bulldog Racing	MINI John Cooper Works	468	(United Kingdom) Charles Cooper	1-2
(Germany) Bulldog Racing	MINI John Cooper Works	468	(Germany) Sebastian Sauerbrei	1-2
	Opel Astra	472	(Germany) Maximilian Eisberg	5-6
	Opel Astra	472	(Germany) Jonas Spölgen	5-6
(Germany) Scuderia Solagon e.V.	Volkswagen Scirocco R	475	(Germany) Kevin Olaf Rost	3, 9
(Germany) Scuderia Solagon e.V.	Volkswagen Scirocco R	475	(Germany) Olaf Rost	3, 9
(Germany) Scuderia Solagon e.V.	Volkswagen Scirocco R	475	(Germany) Hans-Joachim Rabe	9
(Germany) mathilda racing - Team LAVO Carwash	Volkswagen Scirocco R	479	(Germany) Claus Dupré	7-8
(Germany) mathilda racing - Team LAVO Carwash	Volkswagen Scirocco R	479	(Germany) Christoph Dupré	7-8
(Germany) mathilda racing - Team LAVO Carwash	Volkswagen Scirocco R	479	(Germany) Rene Steiger	7-8
(Germany) mathilda racing - Team LAVO Carwash	Volkswagen Scirocco R	479	(Germany) "Tyson"	7
(Germany) mathilda racing - Team LAVO Carwash	Volkswagen Scirocco R	489	(Germany) Felix Schumann	All
(Germany) mathilda racing - Team LAVO Carwash	Volkswagen Scirocco R	489	(Germany) Jürgen Nett	All
(Germany) mathilda racing - Team LAVO Carwash	Volkswagen Scirocco R	489	(Germany) Joachim Nett	All
(Germany) mathilda racing - Team LAVO Carwash	Volkswagen Scirocco R	489	(Germany) Michael Paatz	1-8
(Germany) mathilda racing - Team LAVO Carwash	Volkswagen Scirocco R	498	(Germany) Timo Beuth	All
(Germany) mathilda racing - Team LAVO Carwash	Volkswagen Scirocco R	498	(Germany) Wolfgang Haugg	1-4, 6-7
(Germany) mathilda racing - Team LAVO Carwash	Volkswagen Scirocco R	498	(Germany) Leon Dreiser	1-3, 5-9
(Germany) mathilda racing - Team LAVO Carwash	Volkswagen Scirocco R	498	(Germany) Jan Marschalkowski	4, 7
(Germany) mathilda racing - Team LAVO Carwash	Volkswagen Scirocco R	498	(South Korea) Lim Min-jin	5
(Germany) mathilda racing - Team LAVO Carwash	Volkswagen Scirocco R	498	(Germany) Joachim Nett	5
(Germany) mathilda racing - Team LAVO Carwash	Volkswagen Scirocco R	498	(Germany) "Tyson"	6
(Germany) mathilda racing - Team LAVO Carwash	Volkswagen Scirocco R	498	(Germany) Michael Bohrer	8-9
	Renault Mégane	481	(Germany) Oliver Kriese	4-9
	Renault Mégane	481	(Germany) Maximilian Weissermel	4
	Renault Mégane	481	(Germany) Stefan Trost	5
	Renault Mégane	481	(Germany) Carsten Sieg	5
	Renault Mégane	481	(Germany) Gregor Starck	6-9
	Renault Mégane	481	(Germany) Fabian Tillman	8
	Renault Mégane	481	(Germany) Alexander Becker	9
(Germany) MSC Adenau e.V. im ADAC	Renault Mégane	484	(Thailand) Akkarapong Akkaneenirot	1-2
(Germany) MSC Adenau e.V. im ADAC	Renault Mégane	484	(Thailand) Kris Vasuratna	1-2
(Germany) Hyundai Driving Experience	Hyundai i30N Fastback	485	(Germany) Michael Bohrer	1-6
(Germany) Hyundai Driving Experience	Hyundai i30N Fastback	485	(Germany) Gerrit Holthaus	1-6
(Germany) Hyundai Driving Experience	Hyundai i30N Fastback	485	(Germany) Marcus Willhardt	1-6
(Germany) Hyundai Driving Experience	Hyundai i30N Fastback	485	(Germany) Tobias Overbeck	1-3
(Germany) Hyundai Driving Experience	Hyundai i30N Fastback	486	(South Korea) Park June-sung	1-3
(Germany) Hyundai Driving Experience	Hyundai i30N Fastback	486	(United States) Michael Lewis	1-2
(Germany) Hyundai Driving Experience	Hyundai i30N Fastback	486	(United States) Taylor Hagler	1, 3
(Germany) Hyundai Driving Experience	Hyundai i30N Fastback	486	(United States) Mason Filippi	6
(Germany) Hyundai Driving Experience	Hyundai i30N Fastback	486	(United States) Mark Wilkins	6
(Germany) Hyundai Driving Experience	Hyundai i30N Fastback	486	(China) Cao Hongwei	9
(Germany) Hyundai Driving Experience	Hyundai i30N Fastback	486	(China) Zhendong Zhang	9
(Germany) Hyundai Driving Experience	Hyundai i30N Fastback	487	(United States) Mason Filippi	1-3
(Germany) Hyundai Driving Experience	Hyundai i30N Fastback	487	(United States) Harry Gottsacker	1-3
(Germany) Hyundai Driving Experience	Hyundai i30N Fastback	487	(United States) Taylor Hagler	2
(Germany) Hyundai Driving Experience	Hyundai i30N Fastback	487	(United States) Michael Lewis	3
(Germany) SRS Team Sorg Rennsport	BMW 128ti	488	(Sweden) Andreas Andersson	1-4
(Germany) SRS Team Sorg Rennsport	BMW 128ti	488	(Germany) Achim Feinen	1, 6-7, 9
(Germany) SRS Team Sorg Rennsport	BMW 128ti	488	(United Kingdom) Frank Bird	1
(Germany) SRS Team Sorg Rennsport	BMW 128ti	488	(Austria) Bernhard Wagner	2-4, 6-8
(Germany) SRS Team Sorg Rennsport	BMW 128ti	488	(Germany) Christian Leukers	2
(Germany) SRS Team Sorg Rennsport	BMW 128ti	488	(Germany) Kurt Strube	3-4, 6, 8-9
(Germany) SRS Team Sorg Rennsport	BMW 128ti	488	(United States) Simon Tibbet	6-7
(Germany) SRS Team Sorg Rennsport	BMW 128ti	488	(Germany) Mathias Baar	8-9
(Germany) Giti Tire Motorsport by WS Racing^{1-7} (unnamed) ^{8}	Volkswagen Scirocco	490	(Germany) Ulrich Schmidt	1-3, 5-8
(Germany) Giti Tire Motorsport by WS Racing^{1-7} (unnamed) ^{8}	Volkswagen Scirocco	490	(United Kingdom) Harley Haughton	1-3
(Germany) Giti Tire Motorsport by WS Racing^{1-7} (unnamed) ^{8}	Volkswagen Scirocco	490	(Germany) Axel Jahn	1
(Germany) Giti Tire Motorsport by WS Racing^{1-7} (unnamed) ^{8}	Volkswagen Scirocco	490	(Austria) Max Malinowski	2, 5
(Germany) Giti Tire Motorsport by WS Racing^{1-7} (unnamed) ^{8}	Volkswagen Scirocco	490	(Germany) Robert Hinzer	3
(Germany) Giti Tire Motorsport by WS Racing^{1-7} (unnamed) ^{8}	Volkswagen Scirocco	490	(Germany) Andreas Simon	5, 8
(Germany) Giti Tire Motorsport by WS Racing^{1-7} (unnamed) ^{8}	Volkswagen Scirocco	490	(Latvia) Patricija Stalidzane	5
(Germany) Giti Tire Motorsport by WS Racing^{1-7} (unnamed) ^{8}	Volkswagen Scirocco	490	(China) Samuel Hsieh	6-7
(Germany) Giti Tire Motorsport by WS Racing^{1-7} (unnamed) ^{8}	Volkswagen Scirocco	490	(China) Ma Qing Hua	6-7
(Germany) Zierau Hochvolt by Mertens Motorsport	Hyundai i30N	491	(Germany) Daniel Mertens	All
(Germany) Zierau Hochvolt by Mertens Motorsport	Hyundai i30N	491	(Germany) Christian Alexander Dannesberger	All
(Germany) Zierau Hochvolt by Mertens Motorsport	Hyundai i30N	491	(Germany) Norbert Fischer	1-5
(Germany) Zierau Hochvolt by Mertens Motorsport	Hyundai i30N	491	(United States) Jeff Ricca	6-7
(Germany) Jung Motorsport	Opel Astra	494	(Germany) Tobias Jung	1-4, 6-7
(Germany) Jung Motorsport	Opel Astra	494	(Germany) Andreas Winterwerber	1-4
(Germany) Jung Motorsport	Opel Astra	494	(Germany) Michael Eichhorn	1-3, 6-7
(Germany) Jung Motorsport	Opel Astra	494	(Germany) Lars Füting	5
(Germany) Jung Motorsport	Opel Astra	494	(Germany) Daniel Jenichen	5
(Germany) Jung Motorsport	Opel Astra	494	(Germany) Jean-Christophe David	5
(Germany) Jung Motorsport	Opel Astra	494	(Germany) Andre Kern	6-7
(Germany) Jung Motorsport	Opel Astra	495	(Germany) Tobias Jung	2
(Germany) Jung Motorsport	Opel Astra	495	(Germany) Lars Füting	2
(Germany) Jung Motorsport	Opel Astra	495	(Germany) Tim Robertz	2
(Germany) Jung Motorsport	Opel Astra	495	(Germany) Andre Kern	2
	Hyundai i30N	499	(United Kingdom) Alex Wright	1-4, 8
	Hyundai i30N	499	(Germany) Olaf Hoppelshäuser	1-3
	Hyundai i30N	499	(Germany) Pascal Fritzsche	1-2, 4, 8-9
	Hyundai i30N	499	(Argentina) Marcos Adolfo Vázquez	3
	Hyundai i30N	499	(Germany) Tobi Neuber	9
	Hyundai i30N	499	(Germany) Thomas Schönfeld	9
VT2-R+4WD
(Germany) Adrenalin Motorsport Team Motec	BMW 330i	1	(Germany) Daniel Zils	All
(Germany) Adrenalin Motorsport Team Motec	BMW 330i	1	(Norway) Oskar Sandberg	All
(Germany) Adrenalin Motorsport Team Motec	BMW 330i	1	(Germany) Philipp Leisen	All
(Germany) Adrenalin Motorsport Team Motec	BMW 330i	501	(Germany) Peter Elkmann	1-3
(Germany) Adrenalin Motorsport Team Motec	BMW 330i	501	(Germany) Klaus Faßbender	1, 3-9
(Germany) Adrenalin Motorsport Team Motec	BMW 330i	501	(Switzerland) Michelangelo Comazzi	1, 3
(Germany) Adrenalin Motorsport Team Motec	BMW 330i	501	(Germany) Alexis Graf von Wedel	2
(Germany) Adrenalin Motorsport Team Motec	BMW 330i	501	(Germany) Lando Graf von Wedel	2
(Germany) Adrenalin Motorsport Team Motec	BMW 330i	501	(United Kingdom) Toby Goodman	4-5, 7
(Germany) Adrenalin Motorsport Team Motec	BMW 330i	501	(United Kingdom) Will Hunt	4-5, 7
(Germany) Adrenalin Motorsport Team Motec	BMW 330i	501	(United Kingdom) James Lay	5
(Germany) Adrenalin Motorsport Team Motec	BMW 330i	501	(India) Akshay Gupta	6-7
(Germany) Adrenalin Motorsport Team Motec	BMW 330i	501	(Austria) Markus Flasch	6
(Germany) Adrenalin Motorsport Team Motec	BMW 330i	501	(Germany) Jacob Erlbacher	6
(Germany) Adrenalin Motorsport Team Motec	BMW 330i	501	(France) Laurent Laparra	8
(Germany) Adrenalin Motorsport Team Motec	BMW 330i	501	(France) Grégoire Boutonnet	8
(Germany) Adrenalin Motorsport Team Motec	BMW 330i	501	(United States) Zack Moore	9
(Germany) Adrenalin Motorsport Team Motec	BMW 330i	501	(United States) William Wachs	9
(Germany) Giti Tire Motorsport by WS Racing	BMW 328i	500	(Germany) Matthias Möller	1-2, 6-8
(Germany) Giti Tire Motorsport by WS Racing	BMW 328i	500	(Germany) Fabian Pirrone	1-2, 6-8
(Germany) Giti Tire Motorsport by WS Racing	BMW 328i	500	(Germany) Robert Hinzer	1, 6-8
(Germany) Giti Tire Motorsport by WS Racing	BMW 328i	500	(Germany) Lukas Drost	2, 9
(Germany) Giti Tire Motorsport by WS Racing	BMW 328i	500	(Latvia) Patricija Stalidzane	9
(Germany) Giti Tire Motorsport by WS Racing	BMW 125i	502	(China) Kristie Zhu	2
(Germany) Giti Tire Motorsport by WS Racing	BMW 125i	502	(China) Anning Sun	2
(Germany) Giti Tire Motorsport by WS Racing	BMW 125i	502	(Germany) Lukas Drost	3
(Germany) Giti Tire Motorsport by WS Racing	BMW 125i	502	(Hong Kong) Samuel Hsieh	5
(Germany) Giti Tire Motorsport by WS Racing	BMW 125i	502	(China) Ma Qinghua	5
(Germany) Black Falcon Team Bilstein	BMW 330i	503	(United Kingdom) Jimmy Broadbent	6-9
(Germany) Black Falcon Team Bilstein	BMW 330i	503	(United Kingdom) Steve Alvarez Brown	6-9
(Germany) Black Falcon Team Bilstein	BMW 330i	503	(Netherlands) Misha Charoudin	6-9
(Germany) SRS Team Sorg Rennsport	BMW 330i	504	(Germany) Björn Simon	All
(Germany) SRS Team Sorg Rennsport	BMW 330i	504	(Israel) Moran Gott	1-4
(Germany) SRS Team Sorg Rennsport	BMW 330i	504	(Germany) Anton Bauer	1
(Germany) SRS Team Sorg Rennsport	BMW 330i	504	(Italy) Eduardo Bugane	2-9
(Germany) SRS Team Sorg Rennsport	BMW 330i	504	(Sweden) Andreas Andersson	5-9
(Germany) SRS Team Sorg Rennsport	BMW 330i	504	(Germany) Dmytro Ryzhak	5
(Germany) SRS Team Sorg Rennsport	BMW 330i	504	(Germany) Christian Knötschke	6-7
(Germany) SRS Team Sorg Rennsport	BMW 330i	514	(Netherlands) Piet-Jan Ooms	All
(Germany) SRS Team Sorg Rennsport	BMW 330i	514	(Germany) Hans Joachim Theiß	All
(Germany) SRS Team Sorg Rennsport	BMW 330i	514	(Denmark) Mads Gravsen	1-3
(Germany) SRS Team Sorg Rennsport	BMW 330i	514	(Germany) Richard Jodexnis	4-9
(Germany) SRS Team Sorg Rennsport	BMW 330i	514	(Germany) Luka Wlömer	5-7
(Germany) SRS Team Sorg Rennsport	BMW 330i	524	(France) Joel Le Bihan	2
(Germany) SRS Team Sorg Rennsport	BMW 330i	524	(France) Fabrice Reicher	2
(Germany) SRS Team Sorg Rennsport	BMW 330i	524	(Germany) Christian Leukers	3
(Germany) SRS Team Sorg Rennsport	BMW 330i	524	(Sweden) Hans Lindbohm	3
(Germany) SRS Team Sorg Rennsport	BMW 330i	524	(Monaco) Micah Stanley	3
(Germany) SRS Team Sorg Rennsport	BMW 330i	524	(Germany) Stefan Ertl	5-7
(Germany) SRS Team Sorg Rennsport	BMW 330i	524	(Germany) Lukas Ertl	5-7
(Germany) SRS Team Sorg Rennsport	BMW 330i	524	(Germany) Matthias Benndorf	5-7
(Germany) SRS Team Sorg Rennsport	BMW 330i	524	(Germany) Maximilian Ertl	6-7
(Germany) SRS Team Sorg Rennsport	BMW 330i	524	(Israel) Moran Gott	8
(Germany) SRS Team Sorg Rennsport	BMW 330i	524	(Italy) Ugo Vicenzi	9
(Germany) SRS Team Sorg Rennsport	BMW 330i	524	(Austria) Bernhard Wagner	9
(Germany) QTQ-Raceperformance	BMW 330i	505	(Germany) Maximilian Kurz	1-7, 9
(Germany) QTQ-Raceperformance	BMW 330i	505	(Germany) Riccardo Petrolo	1-7
(Germany) QTQ-Raceperformance	BMW 330i	505	(United States) Danny Souki	1
(Germany) QTQ-Raceperformance	BMW 330i	505	(Germany) Florian Ebener	2-3
(Germany) QTQ-Raceperformance	BMW 330i	505	(Argentina) Eduardo Adrian Romanelli	5
(Germany) QTQ-Raceperformance	BMW 330i	505	(Romania) Theodor Devolescu	6-7
(Germany) QTQ-Raceperformance	BMW 330i	505	(Israel) Moran Gott	9
(Germany) MSC Adenau e.V. im ADAC	BMW F30	508	(Germany) Beat Schmitz Sr.	4-6, 8-9
(Germany) MSC Adenau e.V. im ADAC	BMW F30	508	(Germany) Andre Sommerberg	4-6, 8-9
(Germany) MSC Adenau e.V. im ADAC	BMW F30	508	(Germany) Kevin Wolters	5-6
(Germany) MSC Adenau e.V. im ADAC	BMW F30	508	(Germany) Marcel Manheller	5, 9
(Germany) MSC Adenau e.V. im ADAC	BMW F30	508	(Germany) Sascha Korte	6, 8
(Germany) MSG Bayerischer Wald Hutthurm e.V. im ADAC	BMW 328i	510	(United States) Nico Silva	1, 9
(Germany) MSG Bayerischer Wald Hutthurm e.V. im ADAC	BMW 328i	510	(Germany) Christian Schotte	1
(Germany) MSG Bayerischer Wald Hutthurm e.V. im ADAC	BMW 328i	510	(United States) Rob Walker	1
(Germany) MSG Bayerischer Wald Hutthurm e.V. im ADAC	BMW 328i	510	(United States) Thomas Pendergrass	9
(Germany) MSG Bayerischer Wald Hutthurm e.V. im ADAC	BMW 328i	510	(Germany) Jens Kreutz	9
(Germany) FK Performance Motorsport	BMW 330i	511	(Germany) Michael Schrey	1-7, 9
(Germany) FK Performance Motorsport	BMW 330i	511	(Norway) Sindre Setsås	1-7, 9
(Germany) FK Performance Motorsport	BMW 330i	511	(Switzerland) Ranko Mijatović	1-7
(Germany) FK Performance Motorsport	BMW 330i	511	(Czech Republic) Michal Makeš	9
	BMW 125i	515	(Belgium) Gilles Magnus	2
	BMW 125i	515	(Belgium) Nicolas Baert	2
	BMW 125i	515	(Armenia) Roman Mavlanov	2
(Japan) Team HAL	BMW 125i	515	(Japan) Rintaro Kubo	9
(Japan) Team HAL	BMW 125i	515	(Japan) Masaaki Hatano	9
(Germany) Manheller Racing	BMW F30	516	(Germany) Maximilian von Görtz	4, 6, 8-9
(Germany) Manheller Racing	BMW F30	516	(Germany) Harald Barth	4, 6, 8-9
(Germany) Manheller Racing	BMW F30	516	(Germany) Marcel Manheller	4, 6
(Germany) Manheller Racing	BMW F30	516	(Germany) Marco Zabel	6
(Germany) Manheller Racing	BMW F30	516	(Japan) Yutaka Seki	8-9
(Japan) Team HAL	Toyota Supra	519	(Japan) Masaaki Hatano	6
(Japan) Team HAL	Toyota Supra	519	(Japan) Tohjiro Azuma	6
(Japan) Team HAL	Toyota Supra	519	(Japan) Kouji Obara	6
(Germany) Toyo Tires with Ring Racing	Toyota Supra	519	(Germany) Uwe Kleen	8
(Germany) Toyo Tires with Ring Racing	Toyota Supra	519	(Germany) Rene Rudelt	8
(Germany) Toyo Tires with Ring Racing	Toyota Supra	519	(Germany) Klaus Völker	8
(Germany) Toyo Tires with Ring Racing	Toyota Supra	520	(Germany) Sophia Menzenbach	1-5, 7
(Germany) Toyo Tires with Ring Racing	Toyota Supra	520	(Germany) Richard Jodexnis	1-3
(Germany) Toyo Tires with Ring Racing	Toyota Supra	520	(Germany) Uwe Kleen	1, 5
(Germany) Toyo Tires with Ring Racing	Toyota Supra	520	(Germany) Klaus Völker	4-5, 7
(Germany) Toyo Tires with Ring Racing	Toyota Supra	520	(Germany) Rene Rudelt	4, 7

=== Cup Class ===
==== Porsche Endurance Trophy Nürburgring ====
Team	Car	No.	Drivers	Rounds
CUP2
(Germany) Max Kruse Racing	Porsche 911 GT3 Cup	100	(Germany) Nicholas Otto	All
(Germany) Max Kruse Racing	Porsche 911 GT3 Cup	100	(Germany) Benjamin Leuchter	1-8
(Germany) Max Kruse Racing	Porsche 911 GT3 Cup	100	(Germany) David Jahn	9
(Germany) Max Kruse Racing	Porsche 911 GT3 Cup	127	(United States) Andrew Engelmann	1, 6-7
(Germany) Max Kruse Racing	Porsche 911 GT3 Cup	127	(Germany) Heiko Hammel	1
(Germany) Max Kruse Racing	Porsche 911 GT3 Cup	127	(Netherlands) Jan Jaap van Roon	6-7
(Germany) Max Kruse Racing	Porsche 911 GT3 Cup	127	(Netherlands) Tom Coronel	6-7
(Germany) RPM Racing	Porsche 911 GT3 Cup	101	(United States) Tracy Krohn	3, 9
(Germany) RPM Racing	Porsche 911 GT3 Cup	101	(Sweden) Niclas Jönsson	3, 9
(Germany) Black Falcon Team Identica	Porsche 911 GT3 Cup	102	(Germany) Ben Bünnagel	All
(Germany) Black Falcon Team Identica	Porsche 911 GT3 Cup	102	(Germany) Noah Nagelsdiek	All
(Germany) Black Falcon Team Identica	Porsche 911 GT3 Cup	102	(Luxembourg) Carlos Rivas	1-3
(Germany) Black Falcon Team Identica	Porsche 911 GT3 Cup	102	(Germany) Hendrik von Danwitz	5-7
(Germany) Black Falcon Team Identica	Porsche 911 GT3 Cup	102	(Italy) Gabriele Piana	9
(Germany) Black Falcon Team Textar	Porsche 911 GT3 Cup	103	(Turkey) Mustafa Mehmet Kaya	4-9
(Germany) Black Falcon Team Textar	Porsche 911 GT3 Cup	103	(Germany) Mike Stursberg	4-9
(Germany) Black Falcon Team Textar	Porsche 911 GT3 Cup	103	(Italy) Gabriele Piana	4-5, 8-9
(Germany) Black Falcon Team Textar	Porsche 911 GT3 Cup	103	(Germany) Christopher Mies	6-7
(Germany) PROsport-Racing	Porsche 911 GT3 Cup	104	(Belgium) Simon Balcaen	4-5, 8
(Germany) PROsport-Racing	Porsche 911 GT3 Cup	104	(Germany) Jörg Viebahn	4-5, 8
(Germany) ADAC Sachsen e.V.	Porsche 911 GT3 Cup	105	(Germany) Dominik Fugel	All
(Germany) ADAC Sachsen e.V.	Porsche 911 GT3 Cup	105	(Germany) Fidel Leib Jun.	All
(Germany) ADAC Sachsen e.V.	Porsche 911 GT3 Cup	105	(Germany) Moritz Östreich	2-4
(Germany) ADAC Sachsen e.V.	Porsche 911 GT3 Cup	105	(Germany) Marcel Fugel	5-9
(Germany) PB-Performance	Porsche 911 GT3 Cup	106	(Germany) Ralf-Peter Bonk	3, 5-9
(Germany) PB-Performance	Porsche 911 GT3 Cup	106	(Netherlands) Marco van Ramshorst	3, 5-9
(Germany) Team Mathol Racing e.V.	Porsche 911 GT3 Cup	107	(Germany) Arne Hoffmeister	All
(Germany) Team Mathol Racing e.V.	Porsche 911 GT3 Cup	107	(Austria) Reinhard Kofler	1-3, 5-8
(Germany) Team Mathol Racing e.V.	Porsche 911 GT3 Cup	107	(France) Dorian Boccolacci	1-2
(Germany) Team Mathol Racing e.V.	Porsche 911 GT3 Cup	107	(Germany) Hendrik Still	1, 4-5, 8-9
(Germany) Frikadelli Racing Team	Porsche 911 GT3 Cup	111	(United Kingdom) "Jules"	1-7
(Germany) Frikadelli Racing Team	Porsche 911 GT3 Cup	111	(Germany) Klaus Abbelen	1-7
(Germany) Frikadelli Racing Team	Porsche 911 GT3 Cup	111	(Germany) Hendrik von Danwitz	1
(Germany) Frikadelli Racing Team	Porsche 911 GT3 Cup	111	(Germany) Felipe Fernández Laser	2, 4-7
(Germany) Frikadelli Racing Team	Porsche 911 GT3 Cup	111	(Germany) Leon Köhler	3
(Germany) KKrämer Racing	Porsche 911 GT3 Cup	112	Aleksey Veremenko	All
(Germany) KKrämer Racing	Porsche 911 GT3 Cup	112	(Germany) Herbert Lösch	1-5
(Germany) KKrämer Racing	Porsche 911 GT3 Cup	112	(Germany) Karsten Krämer	1-3, 6-7, 9
(Germany) KKrämer Racing	Porsche 911 GT3 Cup	112	(Germany) Tobias Müller	4, 6-8
(Germany) KKrämer Racing	Porsche 911 GT3 Cup	112	(Kyrgyzstan) "SELV"	5-7, 9
(Germany) KKrämer Racing	Porsche 911 GT3 Cup	112	(Germany) Alexander Akimenkov	5, 9
(Germany) KKrämer Racing	Porsche 911 GT3 Cup	112	(Italy) Michele di Martino	8
(Germany) KKrämer Racing	Porsche 911 GT3 Cup	121	(Germany) Christopher Brück	All
(Germany) KKrämer Racing	Porsche 911 GT3 Cup	121	(Germany) Moritz Kranz	All
(Germany) KKrämer Racing	Porsche 911 GT3 Cup	121	(Germany) Karsten Krämer	1
(Germany) KKrämer Racing	Porsche 911 GT3 Cup	121	(Italy) Michele di Martino	4-7, 9
(Germany) KKrämer Racing	Porsche 911 GT3 Cup	121	(Germany) Tobias Müller	5-9
(Germany) Team Bill Cameron	Porsche 911 GT3 Cup	113	(United Kingdom) Jim Cameron	2-7
(Germany) Team Bill Cameron	Porsche 911 GT3 Cup	113	(Germany) Bill Cameron	2-3, 5-7
(Germany) Clickversicherung Team	Porsche 911 GT3 Cup	119	(Germany) Robin Chrzanowski	1-3, 6-9
(Germany) Clickversicherung Team	Porsche 911 GT3 Cup	119	(Germany) Kersten Jodexnis	1-3, 6-9
(Germany) Clickversicherung Team	Porsche 911 GT3 Cup	119	(Luxembourg) Dylan Pereira	1-2
(Germany) Clickversicherung Team	Porsche 911 GT3 Cup	119	(New Zealand) Peter Scharmach	3, 6-9
(Germany) AVIA W&S Motorsport	Porsche 911 GT3 Cup	120	(Germany) Paul Harkema	1-5, 8-9
(Germany) AVIA W&S Motorsport	Porsche 911 GT3 Cup	120	(Germany) Tim Scheerbarth	1-5, 8-9
(Germany) AVIA W&S Motorsport	Porsche 911 GT3 Cup	120	(Germany) David Jahn	2-5
(Belgium) Mühlner Motorsport	Porsche 911 GT3 Cup	123	(Germany) Marcel Hoppe	1-5, 7-9
(Belgium) Mühlner Motorsport	Porsche 911 GT3 Cup	123	(Germany) Peter Terting	1-5, 7-9
(Belgium) Mühlner Motorsport	Porsche 911 GT3 Cup	123	(Netherlands) Jos Menten	5, 9
(Belgium) Mühlner Motorsport	Porsche 911 GT3 Cup	123	(Germany) Nick Salewsky	7
(Belgium) Mühlner Motorsport	Porsche 911 GT3 Cup	123	(Germany) Tobias Vázquez-Garcia	7
(Belgium) Mühlner Motorsport	Porsche 911 GT3 Cup	123	(United States) Peter Ludwig	8
(Belgium) Mühlner Motorsport	Porsche 911 GT3 Cup	124	(Germany) Nick Salewsky	1-6, 8-9
(Belgium) Mühlner Motorsport	Porsche 911 GT3 Cup	124	(Germany) Tobias Vázquez-Garcia	1-6, 8-9
(Belgium) Mühlner Motorsport	Porsche 911 GT3 Cup	124	(Italy) Michele di Martino	1-3
(Belgium) Mühlner Motorsport	Porsche 911 GT3 Cup	124	(Germany) Thorsten Jung	5
(Belgium) Mühlner Motorsport	Porsche 911 GT3 Cup	124	(Germany) Marcel Hoppe	6
(Belgium) Mühlner Motorsport	Porsche 911 GT3 Cup	124	(Germany) Peter Terting	6
(Belgium) Mühlner Motorsport	Porsche 911 GT3 Cup	124	(Germany) Lukas Ertl	9
(Germany) Huber Motorsport	Porsche 911 GT3 Cup	125	(Germany) Hans Wehrmann	1, 5, 8-9
(Germany) Huber Motorsport	Porsche 911 GT3 Cup	125	(Germany) Thomas Kiefer	1
(Germany) Huber Motorsport	Porsche 911 GT3 Cup	125	(Luxembourg) Carlos Rivas	5
(Germany) Huber Motorsport	Porsche 911 GT3 Cup	125	(Germany) Felipe Fernández Laser	8
(Germany) Huber Motorsport	Porsche 911 GT3 Cup	125	(Germany) Dennis Fetzer	9
(Germany) Huber Motorsport	Porsche 911 GT3 Cup	125	(Belgium) Aris Balanian	9
	Porsche 911 GT3 Cup	129	(Austria) Marco Holzer	3
	Porsche 911 GT3 Cup	129	(New Zealand) Jaxon Evans	3
CUP3
(Germany) Adrenalin Motorsport Team Motec	Porsche 718 Cayman GT4 Clubsport	930	(Germany) Stefan Kruse	All
(Germany) Adrenalin Motorsport Team Motec	Porsche 718 Cayman GT4 Clubsport	930	(Austria) David Griessner	All
(Germany) Adrenalin Motorsport Team Motec	Porsche 718 Cayman GT4 Clubsport	930	(Germany) Matthias Beckwermert	1, 5-7
(Germany) Adrenalin Motorsport Team Motec	Porsche 718 Cayman GT4 Clubsport	930	(Germany) Florian Wolf	2-9
(Germany) Black Falcon Team Textar	Porsche 718 Cayman GT4 Clubsport	931	(United States) Cabell Fisher	1-5, 9
(Germany) Black Falcon Team Textar	Porsche 718 Cayman GT4 Clubsport	931	(Belgium) Didier Glorieux	1-3, 5, 9
(Germany) Black Falcon Team Textar	Porsche 718 Cayman GT4 Clubsport	931	(Germany) Tim-Florian Wahl	1
(Germany) Black Falcon Team Textar	Porsche 718 Cayman GT4 Clubsport	931	(Italy) Gabriele Piana	2
(Germany) Black Falcon Team Textar	Porsche 718 Cayman GT4 Clubsport	931	(Germany) Martin Meenen	4-5
(Germany) Black Falcon Team Textar	Porsche 718 Cayman GT4 Clubsport	931	(Germany) "Iceman"	4
(Germany) Black Falcon Team Textar	Porsche 718 Cayman GT4 Clubsport	931	(Italy) Daniele di Amato	6-7
(Germany) Black Falcon Team Textar	Porsche 718 Cayman GT4 Clubsport	931	(United States) Matt Kehoe	6-7
(Germany) Black Falcon Team Textar	Porsche 718 Cayman GT4 Clubsport	931	(United States) Thomas Roberts	6-7
(Germany) Black Falcon Team Textar	Porsche 718 Cayman GT4 Clubsport	931	(Germany) Axel Sartingen	9
(Germany) Black Falcon Team Textar	Porsche 718 Cayman GT4 Clubsport	932	(Germany) Daniel Schwerfeld	1-2, 6
(Germany) Black Falcon Team Textar	Porsche 718 Cayman GT4 Clubsport	932	(Germany) Axel Sartingen	1, 3, 6
(Germany) Black Falcon Team Textar	Porsche 718 Cayman GT4 Clubsport	932	(Germany) Tim-Florian Wahl	2-3
(Germany) Black Falcon Team Textar	Porsche 718 Cayman GT4 Clubsport	932	(United States) Matt Kehoe	5, 9
(Germany) Black Falcon Team Textar	Porsche 718 Cayman GT4 Clubsport	932	(Ukraine) Oleksiy Kikireshko	5
(Germany) Black Falcon Team Textar	Porsche 718 Cayman GT4 Clubsport	932	(United States) Thomas Roberts	5
(Germany) Black Falcon Team Textar	Porsche 718 Cayman GT4 Clubsport	932	(Italy) Daniele di Amato	9
(Germany) Black Falcon Team Textar	Porsche 718 Cayman GT4 Clubsport	932	(United States) Mark Smith	9
(Germany) Black Falcon Team Textar	Porsche 718 Cayman GT4 Clubsport	980	(United States) Matt Kehoe	9
(Germany) Black Falcon Team Textar	Porsche 718 Cayman GT4 Clubsport	980	(Netherlands) Morris Schuring	9
(Germany) Black Falcon Team Textar	Porsche 718 Cayman GT4 Clubsport	980	(United States) Mark Smith	9
	Porsche 718 Cayman GT4 Clubsport	933	(New Zealand) Grant Dalton	3
	Porsche 718 Cayman GT4 Clubsport	933	(New Zealand) Grant Woolford	3
	Porsche 718 Cayman GT4 Clubsport	933	(United Kingdom) James Breakell	3
(Germany) Team Oehme	Porsche 718 Cayman GT4 Clubsport	944	(Germany) Niklas Öhme	All
(Germany) Team Oehme	Porsche 718 Cayman GT4 Clubsport	944	(Germany) Leonard Öhme	All
(Germany) Team Oehme	Porsche 718 Cayman GT4 Clubsport	944	(Germany) Moritz Öhme	All
(Germany) SRS Team Sorg Rennsport	Porsche 718 Cayman GT4 Clubsport	949	(Germany) Stefan Beyer	All
(Germany) SRS Team Sorg Rennsport	Porsche 718 Cayman GT4 Clubsport	949	(Germany) Carl-Friedrich Kolb	All
(Germany) SRS Team Sorg Rennsport	Porsche 718 Cayman GT4 Clubsport	949	(Germany) Torsten Kratz	1-4, 6-7, 9
(Germany) SRS Team Sorg Rennsport	Porsche 718 Cayman GT4 Clubsport	949	(Denmark) Mads Gravsen	5-7
(Germany) SRS Team Sorg Rennsport	Porsche 718 Cayman GT4 Clubsport	949	(Germany) Philip Schauerte	5
(Germany) SRS Team Sorg Rennsport	Porsche 718 Cayman GT4 Clubsport	949	(Germany) Fabio Grosse	8
(Germany) SRS Team Sorg Rennsport	Porsche 718 Cayman GT4 Clubsport	959	(Germany) Heiko Eichenberg	All
(Germany) SRS Team Sorg Rennsport	Porsche 718 Cayman GT4 Clubsport	959	(Switzerland) Patrik Grütter	All
(Germany) SRS Team Sorg Rennsport	Porsche 718 Cayman GT4 Clubsport	959	(Germany) Fabio Grosse	All
(Germany) SRS Team Sorg Rennsport	Porsche 718 Cayman GT4 Clubsport	969	(Germany) Philipp Beyerle	5, 7
(Germany) SRS Team Sorg Rennsport	Porsche 718 Cayman GT4 Clubsport	969	(Germany) Hans Joachim Theiß	5, 9
(Germany) SRS Team Sorg Rennsport	Porsche 718 Cayman GT4 Clubsport	969	(Germany) Achim Feinen	5
(Germany) SRS Team Sorg Rennsport	Porsche 718 Cayman GT4 Clubsport	969	(Germany) Kurt Strube	5
(Germany) SRS Team Sorg Rennsport	Porsche 718 Cayman GT4 Clubsport	969	(Ukraine) Oleksiy Kikireshko	6-9
(Germany) SRS Team Sorg Rennsport	Porsche 718 Cayman GT4 Clubsport	969	(Germany) Lennard Paul Naumann	6-8
(Germany) SRS Team Sorg Rennsport	Porsche 718 Cayman GT4 Clubsport	969	(Germany) Henning Eschweiler	6-7
(Germany) SRS Team Sorg Rennsport	Porsche 718 Cayman GT4 Clubsport	969	(Spain) Jose Casares Garcia	6
(Germany) SRS Team Sorg Rennsport	Porsche 718 Cayman GT4 Clubsport	969	(Mexico) Benito Tagle	8
(Germany) Schmickler Performance powered by Ravenol ^{1, 3-8} (Germany) Schmickler Performance ^{2}	Porsche 718 Cayman GT4 Clubsport	950	(Germany) Horst Baumann	All
(Germany) Schmickler Performance powered by Ravenol ^{1, 3-8} (Germany) Schmickler Performance ^{2}	Porsche 718 Cayman GT4 Clubsport	950	(Germany) Stefan Schmickler	All
(Germany) Schmickler Performance powered by Ravenol ^{1, 3-8} (Germany) Schmickler Performance ^{2}	Porsche 718 Cayman GT4 Clubsport	950	(Germany) Marcus Schmickler	5-9
(Germany) Schmickler Performance powered by Ravenol ^{1, 3-8} (Germany) Schmickler Performance ^{2}	Porsche 718 Cayman GT4 Clubsport	951	(Germany) Constantin Berz	6-7
(Germany) Schmickler Performance powered by Ravenol ^{1, 3-8} (Germany) Schmickler Performance ^{2}	Porsche 718 Cayman GT4 Clubsport	951	(Germany) Marcus Bers	6-7
(Germany) Schmickler Performance powered by Ravenol ^{1, 3-8} (Germany) Schmickler Performance ^{2}	Porsche 718 Cayman GT4 Clubsport	951	(Germany) Kai Riemer	6-7
(Germany) Smyrlis Racing	Porsche 718 Cayman GT4 Clubsport	952	(Germany) Christopher Rink	All
(Germany) Smyrlis Racing	Porsche 718 Cayman GT4 Clubsport	952	(Italy) Francesco Merlini	All
(Germany) Smyrlis Racing	Porsche 718 Cayman GT4 Clubsport	952	(Germany) Philipp Stahlschmidt	1-4
(Germany) Smyrlis Racing	Porsche 718 Cayman GT4 Clubsport	952	(France) Josh Bednarski	7
(Germany) Team Mathol Racing e.V.	Porsche 718 Cayman GT4 Clubsport	954	(Italy) Alberto Di Folco	9
(Germany) Team Mathol Racing e.V.	Porsche 718 Cayman GT4 Clubsport	954	(Germany) Salman Owega	9
(Germany) Team Mathol Racing e.V.	Porsche 718 Cayman GT4 Clubsport	955	(Switzerland) Rüdiger Schicht	All
(Germany) Team Mathol Racing e.V.	Porsche 718 Cayman GT4 Clubsport	955	(Germany) Alex Fielenbach	All
(Germany) Team Mathol Racing e.V.	Porsche 718 Cayman GT4 Clubsport	955	(Argentina) "Coco"	1-3
(Germany) Team Mathol Racing e.V.	Porsche 718 Cayman GT4 Clubsport	955	(Argentina) Marcos Adolfo Vázquez	1
(Germany) Team Mathol Racing e.V.	Porsche 718 Cayman GT4 Clubsport	955	(Germany) "Montana"	4
(Germany) Team Mathol Racing e.V.	Porsche 718 Cayman GT4 Clubsport	955	(Belgium) Tom Cloet	5-7
(Germany) Team Mathol Racing e.V.	Porsche 718 Cayman GT4 Clubsport	955	(Germany) Maximilian Schmidt	8
(Germany) Team Mathol Racing e.V.	Porsche 718 Cayman GT4 Clubsport	955	(Germany) Erik Braun	9
(Germany) AVIA W&S Motorsport	Porsche 718 Cayman GT4 Clubsport	960	(Germany) Marius Rauer	All
(Germany) AVIA W&S Motorsport	Porsche 718 Cayman GT4 Clubsport	960	(Germany) Moritz Oberheim	All
(Germany) AVIA W&S Motorsport	Porsche 718 Cayman GT4 Clubsport	960	(Germany) Finn Zulauf	1-5, 8-9
(Germany) W&S Motorsport GmbH	Porsche 718 Cayman GT4 Clubsport	961	(Luxembourg) Sébastien Carcone	1-7, 9
(Germany) W&S Motorsport GmbH	Porsche 718 Cayman GT4 Clubsport	961	(Germany) René Höber	1-5, 9
(Germany) W&S Motorsport GmbH	Porsche 718 Cayman GT4 Clubsport	961	(Germany) Heinz Dolfen	2
(Germany) W&S Motorsport GmbH	Porsche 718 Cayman GT4 Clubsport	961	(Germany) Jürgen Vöhringer	3
(Germany) W&S Motorsport GmbH	Porsche 718 Cayman GT4 Clubsport	961	(United States) Andreas Gabler	5-7
(Germany) W&S Motorsport GmbH	Porsche 718 Cayman GT4 Clubsport	961	(France) Josh Bednarski	9
(Germany) W&S Motorsport GmbH	Porsche 718 Cayman GT4 Clubsport	962	(Germany) Niclas Wiedmann	All
(Germany) W&S Motorsport GmbH	Porsche 718 Cayman GT4 Clubsport	962	(Finland) Philip Miemois	All
(Germany) W&S Motorsport GmbH	Porsche 718 Cayman GT4 Clubsport	962	(Switzerland) Mauro Calamia	1-5
(Germany) W&S Motorsport GmbH	Porsche 718 Cayman GT4 Clubsport	962	(Germany) Daniel Blickle	6-7
(Germany) Huber Racing	Porsche 718 Cayman GT4 Clubsport	963	(Austria) Luca Rettenbacher	1
(Germany) Huber Racing	Porsche 718 Cayman GT4 Clubsport	963	(Germany) David Kiefer	1
(Germany) Huber Racing	Porsche 718 Cayman GT4 Clubsport	963	(Germany) Marius Kiefer	1
(Germany) Huber Racing	Porsche 718 Cayman GT4 Clubsport	963	(Germany) Stefan Kiefer	1
(Germany) KKrämer Racing	Porsche 718 Cayman GT4 Clubsport	977	(Germany) Guido Tönnessen	1-3
(Germany) KKrämer Racing	Porsche 718 Cayman GT4 Clubsport	977	(United States) Kevin Clifford	1, 3
(Germany) KKrämer Racing	Porsche 718 Cayman GT4 Clubsport	977	(Germany) Anke Lawenstein	1
(Germany) KKrämer Racing	Porsche 718 Cayman GT4 Clubsport	977	(Germany) Olaf Baunack	2
(Germany) KKrämer Racing	Porsche 718 Cayman GT4 Clubsport	977	(Germany) Karl-Heinz Meyer	2
(Germany) KKrämer Racing	Porsche 718 Cayman GT4 Clubsport	977	(Switzerland) Michelangelo Comazzi	2
(Germany) Lionspeed GP	Porsche 718 Cayman GT4 Clubsport	979	(United States) Daniel Miller	6-7
(Germany) Lionspeed GP	Porsche 718 Cayman GT4 Clubsport	979	(Germany) Patrick Kolb	6-7
(Germany) Lionspeed GP	Porsche 718 Cayman GT4 Clubsport	979	(Spain) Jose Casares Garcia	7

==== Other Cup classes ====
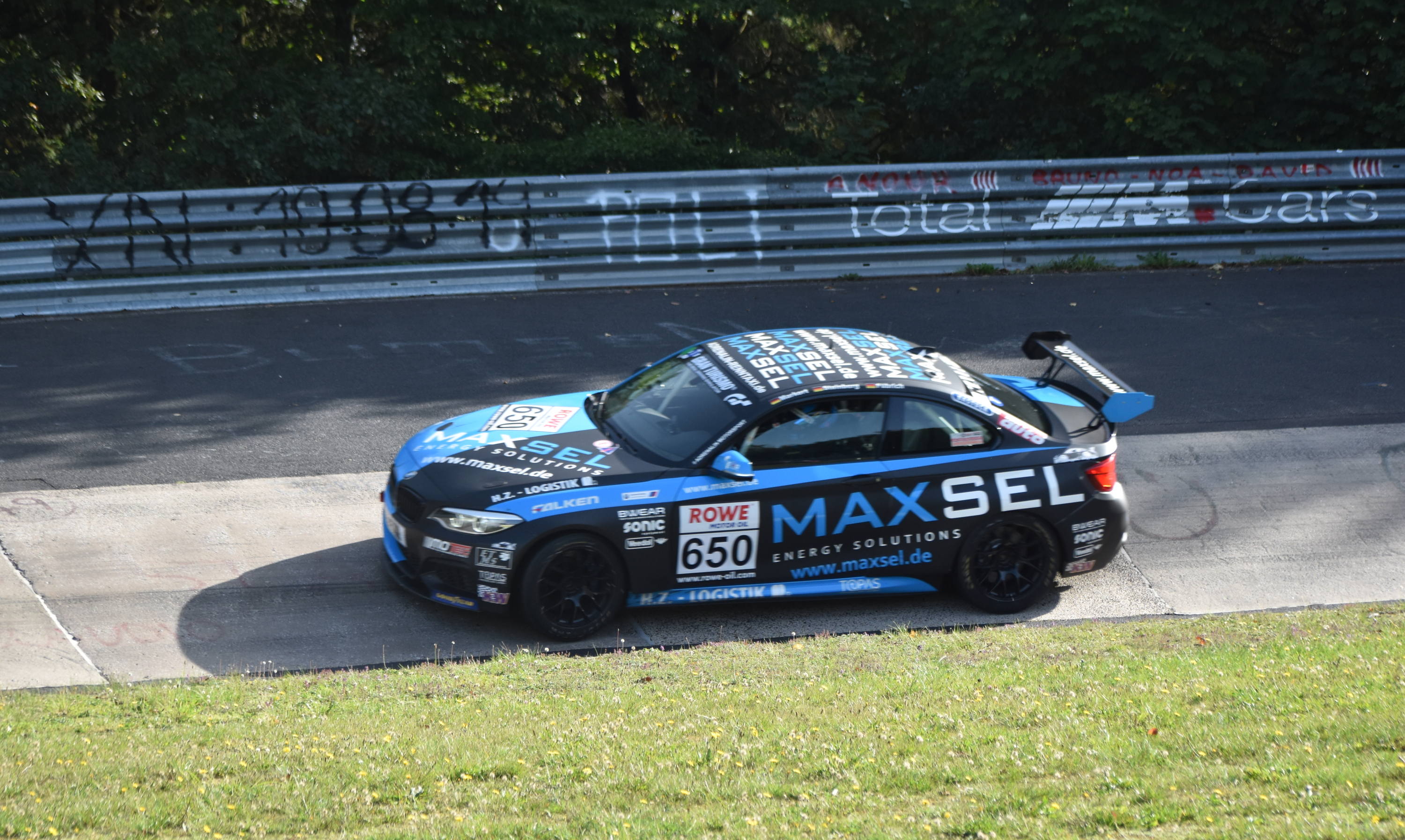
BMW M240i teams champions, #650 Adrenalin Motorsport Team Motec

Team	Car	No.	Drivers	Rounds
BMW M240i
(Germany) Adrenalin Motorsport Team Motec	BMW M240i Racing Cup	650	(Germany) Sven Markert	All
(Germany) Adrenalin Motorsport Team Motec	BMW M240i Racing Cup	650	(Germany) Nils Steinberg	All
(Germany) Adrenalin Motorsport Team Motec	BMW M240i Racing Cup	650	(Germany) Yannick Fübrich	All
(Germany) Adrenalin Motorsport Team Motec	BMW M240i Racing Cup	650	(Germany) Nick Deißler	5-7
(Germany) Adrenalin Motorsport Team Motec	BMW M240i Racing Cup	651	(Germany) Aaron Wenisch	All
(Germany) Adrenalin Motorsport Team Motec	BMW M240i Racing Cup	651	(Germany) Marvin Marino	All
(Germany) Adrenalin Motorsport Team Motec	BMW M240i Racing Cup	651	(Germany) Marco Büsker	1-3
(Germany) Adrenalin Motorsport Team Motec	BMW M240i Racing Cup	651	(Switzerland) Michelangelo Comazzi	4, 6-7
(Germany) Adrenalin Motorsport Team Motec	BMW M240i Racing Cup	651	(Germany) Christoph Merkt	5
(Germany) Adrenalin Motorsport Team Motec	BMW M240i Racing Cup	651	(Germany) Michel Albers	5
(Germany) Adrenalin Motorsport Team Motec	BMW M240i Racing Cup	651	(Germany) Alex Hardt	6-9
(Germany) Adrenalin Motorsport Team Motec	BMW M240i Racing Cup	652	(Germany) Lars Harbeck	1-4, 6-7
(Germany) Adrenalin Motorsport Team Motec	BMW M240i Racing Cup	652	(Germany) Christian Kraus	1-4, 6-7
(Germany) Adrenalin Motorsport Team Motec	BMW M240i Racing Cup	652	(Germany) Alexander Müller	1, 3-4, 6-7
(Germany) Adrenalin Motorsport Team Motec	BMW M240i Racing Cup	652	(United Kingdom) Bailey Voisin	2
(Germany) Adrenalin Motorsport Team Motec	BMW M240i Racing Cup	652	(United States) Andrie Hartanto	5
(Germany) Adrenalin Motorsport Team Motec	BMW M240i Racing Cup	652	(United States) Patrick Chio	5
(Germany) Adrenalin Motorsport Team Motec	BMW M240i Racing Cup	652	(Germany) Christoph Merkt	6
(Germany) Adrenalin Motorsport Team Motec	BMW M240i Racing Cup	652	(Germany) Yannik Himmels	8-9
(Germany) Adrenalin Motorsport Team Motec	BMW M240i Racing Cup	652	(United States) Mike Skeen	8
(Germany) Adrenalin Motorsport Team Motec	BMW M240i Racing Cup	652	(Germany) Michel Albers	8
(Germany) Adrenalin Motorsport Team Motec	BMW M240i Racing Cup	652	(Switzerland) John Larsson	9
(Germany) Adrenalin Motorsport Team Motec	BMW M240i Racing Cup	652	(Germany) Andreas Winkler	9
(Germany) Adrenalin Motorsport Team Motec	BMW M240i Racing Cup	655	(United States) Daniel Bloom	5
(Germany) Adrenalin Motorsport Team Motec	BMW M240i Racing Cup	655	(United States) Joshua Jacobs	5
(Germany) Adrenalin Motorsport Team Motec	BMW M240i Racing Cup	655	(United States) Judson Holt	5
(Germany) Adrenalin Motorsport Team Motec	BMW M240i Racing Cup	655	(United States) Denny Stripling	5
(Germany) Adrenalin Motorsport Team Motec	BMW M240i Racing Cup	655	(Germany) Yannick Himmels	6
(Germany) Adrenalin Motorsport Team Motec	BMW M240i Racing Cup	655	(Germany) Sascha Steinhardt	6
(Germany) Adrenalin Motorsport Team Motec	BMW M240i Racing Cup	655	(Germany) Simon Paul Klemund	6
(Germany) Adrenalin Motorsport Team Motec	BMW M240i Racing Cup	655	(Germany) Marvin Marino	6
(Germany) Adrenalin Motorsport Team Motec	BMW M240i Racing Cup	655	(Germany) Lars Harbeck	7
(Germany) Adrenalin Motorsport Team Motec	BMW M240i Racing Cup	655	(Germany) Christian Kraus	7
(Germany) Adrenalin Motorsport Team Motec	BMW M240i Racing Cup	655	(Germany) Klaus Faßbender	7
(Germany) Adrenalin Motorsport Team Motec	BMW M240i Racing Cup	655	(Germany) Christoph Merkt	8
(Germany) Adrenalin Motorsport Team Motec	BMW M240i Racing Cup	655	(Germany) Philip Schauerte	8
(Germany) Adrenalin Motorsport Team Motec	BMW M240i Racing Cup	655	(Germany) Nick Deißler	8
(Germany) Adrenalin Motorsport Team Motec	BMW M240i Racing Cup	655	(Germany) "Sub7BTG"	9
(Germany) Adrenalin Motorsport Team Motec	BMW M240i Racing Cup	655	(France) Grégoire Boutonnet	9
(Germany) Adrenalin Motorsport Team Motec	BMW M240i Racing Cup	655	(France) Laurent Laparra	9
	BMW M240i Racing Cup	653	(Germany) Sascha Lott	1-4, 8
	BMW M240i Racing Cup	653	(Germany) Florian Sternkopf	1
	BMW M240i Racing Cup	653	(Germany) Markus Nölken	2-3, 5-9
	BMW M240i Racing Cup	653	(Germany) Lucas Lange	4, 8
	BMW M240i Racing Cup	653	(Germany) Carl-Friedrich Kolb	5
	BMW M240i Racing Cup	653	(Germany) Sascha Hancke	6-7, 9
	BMW M240i Racing Cup	653	(Germany) Maximilian Struwe	6
(Germany) Smyrlis Racing	BMW M240i Racing Cup	660	(Germany) Anton Ruf	1-6, 8
(Germany) Smyrlis Racing	BMW M240i Racing Cup	660	(Germany) Roland Fröse	1-5, 8
(Germany) Smyrlis Racing	BMW M240i Racing Cup	660	(Germany) Daniel Rexhausen	1-3
(Germany) Smyrlis Racing	BMW M240i Racing Cup	660	(France) Josh Bednarski	4-6
(Germany) Smyrlis Racing	BMW M240i Racing Cup	660	(Germany) Jacob Riegel	6, 8
(Germany) Smyrlis Racing	BMW M240i Racing Cup	661	(Italy) Lorenzo Medori	4-5
(Germany) Smyrlis Racing	BMW M240i Racing Cup	661	(Italy) Simone Sama	4-5
(Germany) Smyrlis Racing	BMW M240i Racing Cup	661	(Italy) Andrea Sapino	4-5
(Germany) Smyrlis Racing	BMW M240i Racing Cup	662	(Germany) Andreas Müller	6-7
(Germany) Smyrlis Racing	BMW M240i Racing Cup	662	(Germany) Michael Frigge	6-7
(Germany) Smyrlis Racing	BMW M240i Racing Cup	662	(Germany) Daniel Rexhausen	6
(Germany) Smyrlis Racing	BMW M240i Racing Cup	662	(Germany) Jacob Riegel	7
(Germany) Schnitzelalm Racing	BMW M240i Racing Cup	665	(Netherlands) Colin Caresani	1
(Germany) Schnitzelalm Racing	BMW M240i Racing Cup	665	(Estonia) Ralf Aron	1
(Germany) Schnitzelalm Racing	BMW M240i Racing Cup	665	(Germany) Timo Kieslich	1
(Germany) Schnitzelalm Racing	BMW M240i Racing Cup	665	(United States) Jonathan Miller	5-7
(Germany) Schnitzelalm Racing	BMW M240i Racing Cup	665	(Canada) Samantha Tan	5-7
(Germany) Schnitzelalm Racing	BMW M240i Racing Cup	665	(United States) Bryson Morris	5-7
(Germany) Schnitzelalm Racing	BMW M240i Racing Cup	665	(France) Adrien Paviot	8-9
(Germany) Schnitzelalm Racing	BMW M240i Racing Cup	665	(France) Valentin Belgy	8-9
(Germany) Schnitzelalm Racing	BMW M240i Racing Cup	665	(France) Nikolas Markiewicz	8-9
(Germany) Schnitzelalm Racing	BMW M240i Racing Cup	666	(Germany) Michael Sander	All
(Germany) Schnitzelalm Racing	BMW M240i Racing Cup	666	(Finland) Juuso Puhakka	1, 3
(Germany) Schnitzelalm Racing	BMW M240i Racing Cup	666	(Germany) Dr. Anton Hahnenkamm	1
(Germany) Schnitzelalm Racing	BMW M240i Racing Cup	666	(Estonia) Ralf Aron	2
(Germany) Schnitzelalm Racing	BMW M240i Racing Cup	666	(Germany) Marek Böckmann	2
(Germany) Schnitzelalm Racing	BMW M240i Racing Cup	666	(Netherlands) Colin Caresani	2
(Germany) Schnitzelalm Racing	BMW M240i Racing Cup	666	(Germany) Carlo Scholl	3
(Germany) Schnitzelalm Racing	BMW M240i Racing Cup	666	(Netherlands) Thierry Vermeulen	4
(Germany) Schnitzelalm Racing	BMW M240i Racing Cup	666	(Finland) Konsta Lappalainen	4
(Germany) Schnitzelalm Racing	BMW M240i Racing Cup	666	(Germany) Jay Mo Härtling	5-7, 9
(Germany) Schnitzelalm Racing	BMW M240i Racing Cup	666	(Germany) Philip Wiskirchen	5, 8
(Germany) Schnitzelalm Racing	BMW M240i Racing Cup	666	(Germany) Timo Kieslich	5
(Germany) Schnitzelalm Racing	BMW M240i Racing Cup	666	(Germany) Tim Neuser	6-7, 9
(Germany) Schnitzelalm Racing	BMW M240i Racing Cup	666	(Germany) Marcel Marchewicz	6-7, 9
(Germany) Schnitzelalm Racing	BMW M240i Racing Cup	666	(Germany) Markus Eichele	8
(Germany) Schnitzelalm Racing	BMW M240i Racing Cup	674	(Germany) Walter Wilhelm Laschet	1
(Germany) Schnitzelalm Racing	BMW M240i Racing Cup	674	(Germany) Fabio Laschet	1
(Germany) Schnitzelalm Racing	BMW M240i Racing Cup	674	(Germany) Jay Mo Härtling	1
(Germany) Schnitzelalm Racing	BMW M240i Racing Cup	674	(Germany) Michael Sander	2, 9
(Germany) Schnitzelalm Racing	BMW M240i Racing Cup	674	(Estonia) Ralf Aron	2
(Germany) Schnitzelalm Racing	BMW M240i Racing Cup	674	(Germany) Marek Böckmann	2
(Germany) Schnitzelalm Racing	BMW M240i Racing Cup	674	(Netherlands) Colin Caresani	2
(Germany) Schnitzelalm Racing	BMW M240i Racing Cup	674	(Luxembourg) Gil Linster	9
(Germany) Schnitzelalm Racing	BMW M240i Racing Cup	674	(Germany) Philip Wiskirchen	9
(Germany) Up2Race	BMW M240i Racing Cup	680	(Germany) Anton Abee	9
(Germany) Up2Race	BMW M240i Racing Cup	680	(Germany) Timo Glock	9
(Germany) Up2Race	BMW M240i Racing Cup	680	(Germany) Michel Albers	9
(Germany) Eifelkind Racing ^{1} (Germany) MSC SINZIG e.V. im ADAC ^{3} (unnamed) ^{4-9}	BMW M240i Racing Cup	691	(Germany) Benno Zerlin	1, 3-6, 9
(Germany) Eifelkind Racing ^{1} (Germany) MSC SINZIG e.V. im ADAC ^{3} (unnamed) ^{4-9}	BMW M240i Racing Cup	691	(Germany) Kevin Wambach	1, 3, 6
(Germany) Eifelkind Racing ^{1} (Germany) MSC SINZIG e.V. im ADAC ^{3} (unnamed) ^{4-9}	BMW M240i Racing Cup	691	(Switzerland) Dominic Kulpowicz	1, 3
(Germany) Eifelkind Racing ^{1} (Germany) MSC SINZIG e.V. im ADAC ^{3} (unnamed) ^{4-9}	BMW M240i Racing Cup	691	(Austria) Maximilian Vogl	4-5
(Germany) Eifelkind Racing ^{1} (Germany) MSC SINZIG e.V. im ADAC ^{3} (unnamed) ^{4-9}	BMW M240i Racing Cup	691	(Germany) Philipp Gresek	5
BMW M2 CS
	BMW M2 ClubSport Racing	884	(Denmark) Peter Larsen	3-7
	BMW M2 ClubSport Racing	884	(Sweden) Johan Rosèn	3-7
	BMW M2 ClubSport Racing	884	(Germany) Friedhelm Thelen	6-7
	BMW M2 ClubSport Racing	884	(Germany) Michael Mönch	6
(Germany) Schubert Motorsport GmbH	BMW M2 ClubSport Racing	888	(Germany) Michael von Zabiensky	1-3
(Germany) Schubert Motorsport GmbH	BMW M2 ClubSport Racing	888	(Denmark) Andreas Jochimsen	1-3
(Germany) Schubert Motorsport GmbH	BMW M2 ClubSport Racing	888	(Germany) Torsten Schubert	1
(Germany) Schubert Motorsport GmbH	BMW M2 ClubSport Racing	888	(Germany) Stefan von Zabiensky	3
	BMW M2 ClubSport Racing	899	(Germany) Thomas Leyherr	4, 8-9
	BMW M2 ClubSport Racing	899	(Germany) Klaus Faßbender	4
	BMW M2 ClubSport Racing	899	(Switzerland) Ranko Mijatović	8-9

=== Gruppe H historic cars ===
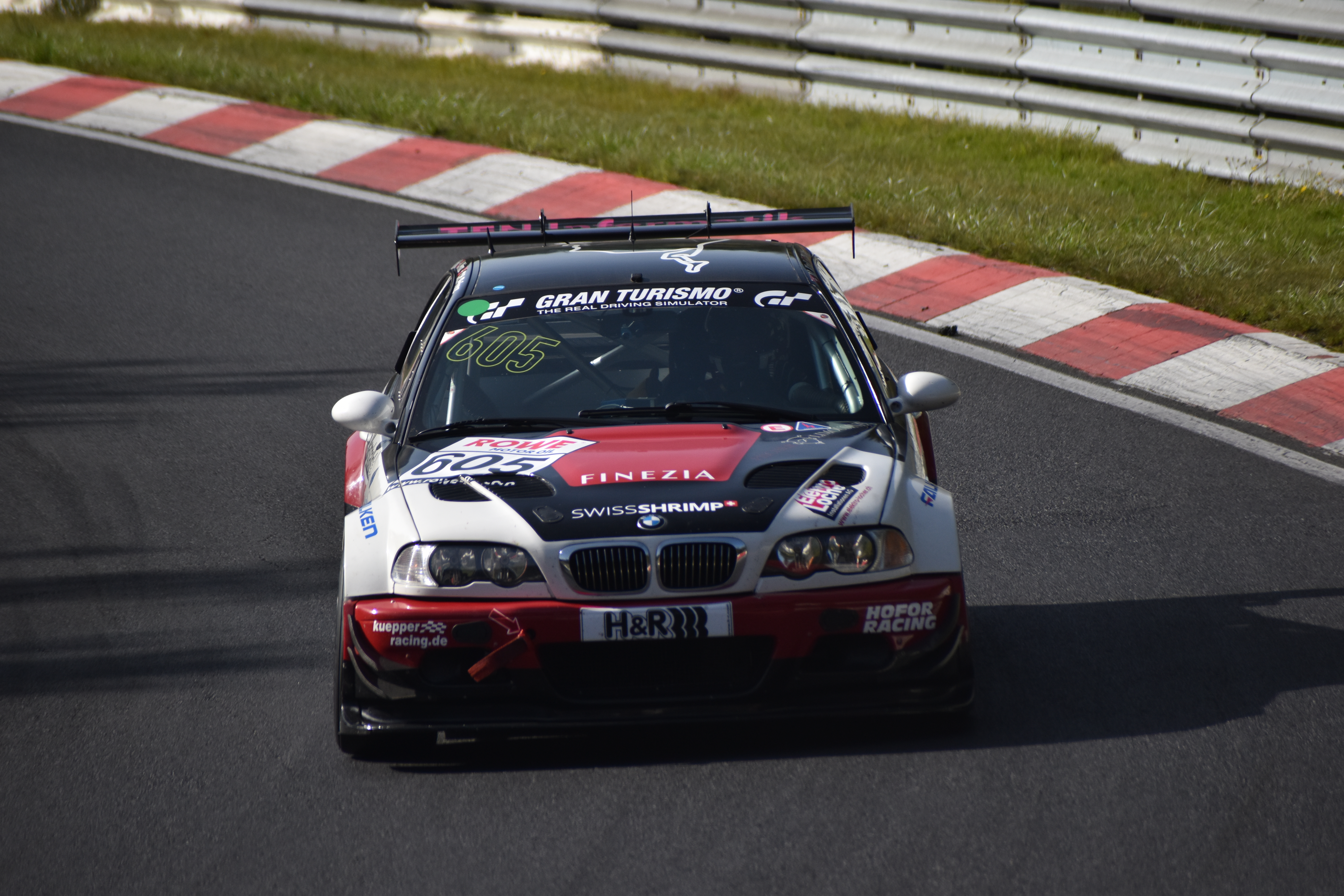
#605 BMW M3 E46 entry of Hofor - racing

Team	Car	No.	Drivers	Rounds
H4
(unnamed) ^{1-2} (Germany) DSK e.V. ^{3-4,6}	BMW M3 E92 GTR	600	(Germany) Bernd Kleeschulte	1-4, 6
(unnamed) ^{1-2} (Germany) DSK e.V. ^{3-4,6}	BMW M3 E92 GTR	600	(Germany) David Ackermann	3, 6
(unnamed) ^{1-2} (Germany) DSK e.V. ^{3-4,6}	BMW M3 E92 GTR	600	(Germany) Bernd Küpper	6
(Germany) Hofor - Racing	BMW M3 E46 CSL	602	(Germany) Martin Kroll	3
(Germany) Hofor - Racing	BMW M3 E46 CSL	602	(Germany) Michael Kroll	3
(Germany) Hofor - Racing	BMW M3 E46 CSL	602	(Germany) Alexander Prinz	3
(Germany) Hofor - Racing	BMW M3 E46 CSL	602	(Switzerland) Chantal Prinz	3
(Germany) Hofor - Racing	BMW M3 E46 GTR	605	(Germany) Michael Kroll	4-5, 8-9
(Germany) Hofor - Racing	BMW M3 E46 GTR	605	(Germany) Alexander Prinz	4-5, 8-9
(Germany) Hofor - Racing	BMW M3 E46 GTR	605	(Germany) Martin Kroll	4
(Germany) Hofor - Racing	BMW M3 E46 GTR	605	(Germany) Thomas Mühlenz	5
(Germany) Hofor - Racing	BMW M3 E46 GTR	605	(Switzerland) Chantal Prinz	8
H2
(Germany) MSC Adenau e.V. im ADAC	Renault Clio RS	620	(Germany) Stephan Epp	1
(Germany) MSC Adenau e.V. im ADAC	Renault Clio RS	620	(Germany) Michael Ülwer	1
(Germany) MSC Adenau e.V. im ADAC	Renault Clio RS	620	(Germany) Timo Kaatz	1

== Results ==
Results indicates overall winner across all classes.

Rnd	Race	Pole position	Overall winners
1	68. ADAC Westfalenfahrt	(Germany) No. 34 Walkenhorst Motorsport	(Germany) No. 99 ROWE Racing
1	68. ADAC Westfalenfahrt	(Poland) Jakub Giermaziak (Spain) Andy Soucek	(Belgium) Dries Vanthoor (Belgium) Maxime Martin
2	47. NIMEX DMV 4-Stunden-Rennen	(Germany) No. 21 Rutronik Racing	(Germany) No. 34 Walkenhorst Motorsport
2	47. NIMEX DMV 4-Stunden-Rennen	(Italy) Matteo Cairoli (France) Julien Andlauer	(Poland) Jakub Giermaziak (Finland) Jesse Krohn
3	54. Adenauer ADAC Rundstrecken-Trophy	(Germany) No. 98 ROWE Racing	(Germany) No. 44 BMW Junior Team
3	54. Adenauer ADAC Rundstrecken-Trophy	(South Africa) Sheldon van der Linde (Belgium) Dries Vanthoor	(United Kingdom) Daniel Harper (Germany) Max Hesse (United States) Neil Verhagen
4	46. RCM DMV Grenzlandrennen	(Germany) No. 5 Scherer Sport PHX	(Germany) No. 34 Walkenhorst Motorsport
4	46. RCM DMV Grenzlandrennen	(Germany) Vincent Kolb (Germany) Frank Stippler	(Poland) Jakub Giermaziak (Norway) Christian Krognes
5	ROWE 6h ADAC Ruhr-Pokal-Rennen	(Germany) No. 5 Scherer Sport PHX	(Germany) No. 3 Falken Motorsports
5	ROWE 6h ADAC Ruhr-Pokal-Rennen	(Germany) Vincent Kolb (Germany) Frank Stippler	(Sweden) Joel Eriksson (United Kingdom) David Pittard
6	63. ADAC ACAS Cup	(Germany) No. 19 racing one	(Germany) No. 34 Walkenhorst Motorsport
6	63. ADAC ACAS Cup	(Germany) Stefan Aust (Germany) Christian Kohlhaas (Germany) Luca Ludwig (Germany) "Jacob Schell"	(Poland) Jakub Giermaziak (Norway) Christian Krognes
7	62. ADAC Reinoldus-Langstreckenrennen	(Germany) No. 5 Scherer Sport PHX	(Germany) No. 34 Walkenhorst Motorsport
7	62. ADAC Reinoldus-Langstreckenrennen	(Germany) Vincent Kolb (Germany) Frank Stippler	(Poland) Jakub Giermaziak (Norway) Christian Krognes
8	55. ADAC Barbarossapreis	(Germany) No. 5 Scherer Sport PHX	(Germany) No. 34 Walkenhorst Motorsport
8	55. ADAC Barbarossapreis	(Germany) Vincent Kolb (Germany) Frank Stippler	(Poland) Jakub Giermaziak (Norway) Christian Krognes
9	47. PAGID Racing DMV Münsterlandpokal	(Germany) No. 5 Scherer Sport PHX	(Germany) No. 5 Scherer Sport PHX
9	47. PAGID Racing DMV Münsterlandpokal	(Germany) Frank Stippler (Germany) Christopher Mies	(Germany) Frank Stippler (Germany) Christopher Mies

== Championship standings ==
=== Points system ===
==== Drivers classification ====
For drivers classification, points are awarded based on race duration, position in class, and number of starters in class. At the end of the season, best 7 races will count for the championship and the rest will be dropped; however, disqualifications or race bans cannot be dropped.

In case of a driver entering for multiple cars in a race, they should nominate which car should they score points from; otherwise they automatically score from the car with the lowest start number.

4-hours race

Position in class	Starter cars in class						
Position in class	1	2	3	4	5	6	7+
1st	2	3	4	6	8	11	15
2nd	-	2	3	4	6	8	11
3rd	-	-	2	3	4	6	8
4th	-	-	-	2	3	4	6
5th	-	-	-	-	2	3	4
6th	-	-	-	-	-	2	3
7th	-	-	-	-	-	-	2
8th and below	-	-	-	-	-	-	1

6-hours race

Position in class	Starter cars in class						
Position in class	1	2	3	4	5	6	7+
1st	3	4	5	8	10	14	19
2nd	-	3	4	5	8	10	14
3rd	-	-	3	4	5	8	10
4th	-	-	-	3	4	5	8
5th	-	-	-	-	3	4	5
6th	-	-	-	-	-	3	4
7th	-	-	-	-	-	-	3
8th and below	-	-	-	-	-	-	1

==== Teams ====
For teams championships, points are awarded by finishing position. Also, for overall teams classification only, bonus points are awarded for top 3 in qualifying.

Position	**1st**	**2nd**	**3rd**	**4th**	**5th**	**6th**	**7th**	**8th**	**9th**	**10th**	**11th**	**12th**	**13th**	**14th**	**15th**	**16th**	**17th**	**18th**	**19th**	**20th**
Qualifying	3	2	1																	
Race	35	28	25	22	20	18	16	14	12	11	10	9	8	7	6	5	4	3	2	1

==== CUP2 & CUP3 ====
Classes CUP2 and CUP3 are part of Porsche Endurance Trophy Nürburgring and have their own points system.

Position	**1st**	**2nd**	**3rd**	**4th**	**5th**	**6th**	**7th**	**8th**	**9th**	**10th**	**11th**	**12th**	**13th**	**14th**	**15th**	**Pole**	**FL**
4 hours	20	17	15	13	11	10	9	8	7	6	5	4	3	2	1	1	1
6 hours	30	25.5	22.5	19.5	16.5	15	13.5	12	10.5	9	7.5	6	4.5	3	1.5	1	1

=== Drivers classification ===
==== Overall ====
Pos.	Driver	Team	Class	NLS1	NLS2	NLS3	NLS4	NLS5	NLS6	NLS7	NLS8	NLS9	Points
1=	(Germany) Philipp Leisen (Norway) Oskar Sandberg	(Germany) #1 Adrenalin Motorsport Team Motec	VT2-R+4WD	49 (1)	53 (1)	58 (1)	41 (1)	41 (1)	41 (1)	39 (1)	37 (1)	47 (1)	117 (147)
1=	(Germany) Daniel Zils	(Germany) #1 Adrenalin Motorsport Team Motec	VT2-R+4WD	49 (1)	53 (1)	58 (1)	41 (1)	41 (1)	41 (1)	39 (1)	37 (1)	47 (1)	117 (147)
1=	(Germany) Daniel Zils	(Germany) #396 Adrenalin Motorsport Team Motec	V6	47 (1)	62 (1)	55 (1)	43 (1)	44 (1)	72 (2)	37 (1)	54 (2)	42 (1)	117 (147)
4=	(Germany) Heiko Eichenberg (Switzerland) Patrik Grütter	(Germany) #959 SRS Team Sorg Rennsport	CUP3	27 (1)	27 (2)	27 (2)	19 (1)	19 (1)	20 (1)	18 (1)	17 (1)	23 (2)	113 (135)
4=	(Germany) Fabio Grosse	(Germany) #959 SRS Team Sorg Rennsport	CUP3	27 (1)	27 (2)	27 (2)	19 (1)	19 (1)	20 (1)	18 (1)	17 (1)	23 (2)	113 (135)
4=	(Germany) Fabio Grosse	(Germany) #949 SRS Team Sorg Rennsport	CUP3								21 (4)		113 (135)
7	(Germany) Yannick Fübrich (Germany) Sven Markert (Germany) Nils Steinberg	(Germany) #650 Adrenalin Motorsport Team Motec	BMW M240i	46 (1)	50 (1)	54 (1)	38 (1)	36 (1)	Ret	DNS	36 (1)	40 (1)	109
10	(Germany) Daniel Mertens (Germany) Christian Alexander Dannesberger	(Germany) #491 Zierau Hochvolt by Mertens Motorsport	VT2-FWD	54 (1)	75 (3)	70 (2)	50 (2)	57 (3)	63 (2)	43 (1)	40 (1)	96 (8)	95 (104)
12	(Germany) Nicholas Otto	(Germany) #100 Max Kruse Racing	CUP2	18 (3)	21 (3)	17 (3)	6 (2)	5 (1)	8 (1)	5 (1)	DSQ	15 (5)	92 (96)
13	(Germany) Benjamin Leuchter	(Germany) #100 Max Kruse Racing	CUP2	18 (3)	21 (3)	17 (3)	6 (2)	5 (1)	8 (1)	5 (1)	DSQ		92
14	(Germany) Christopher Brück (Germany) Moritz Kranz	(Germany) #121 KKrämer Racing	CUP2	Ret	18 (1)	15 (1)	7 (3)	9 (4)	9 (2)	6 (2)	6 (1)	12 (3)	89 (97)
16	(Germany) Michael Bohrer	(Germany) #485 Hyundai Driving Experience	VT2-FWD	55 (2)	66 (2)	71 (3)	49 (1)	49 (1)	Ret				83
16	(Germany) Michael Bohrer	(Germany) #498 mathilda racing - Team LAVO Carwash	VT2-FWD								47 (3)	62 (2)	83
17	(Germany) Thorsten Wolter (Germany) Nick Wüstenhagen	(Germany) #187 FK Performance Motorsport	SP10	30 (1)	31 (1)	29 (2)	Ret	20 (1)	26 (1)	17 (1)	18 (1)	26 (1)	82 (90)
19	(Germany) Michael Paatz	(Germany) #489 mathilda racing - Team LAVO Carwash	VT2-FWD	Ret	65 (1)	67 (1)	51 (3)	Ret	60 (1)	47 (2)	44 (2)		82
20=	(Germany) Felix Schumann (Germany) Jürgen Nett	(Germany) #489 mathilda racing - Team LAVO Carwash	VT2-FWD	Ret	65 (1)	67 (1)	51 (3)	Ret	60 (1)	47 (2)	44 (2)	DNS	82
20=	(Germany) Joachim Nett	(Germany) #489 mathilda racing - Team LAVO Carwash	VT2-FWD	Ret	65 (1)	67 (1)	51 (3)	Ret	60 (1)	47 (2)	44 (2)	DNS	82
20=	(Germany) Joachim Nett	(Germany) #498 mathilda racing - Team LAVO Carwash	VT2-FWD					67 (5)					82
23	(Germany) Christopher Rink (Italy) Francesco Merlini	(Germany) #952 Smyrlis Racing	CUP3	29 (3)	107 (11)	26 (1)	DNS	22 (3)	21 (2)	20 (2)	20 (3)	28 (3)	77 (78)
25	(Germany) Ben Bünnagel (Germany) Noah Nagelsdiek	(Germany) #102 Black Falcon Team Identica	CUP2	Ret	19 (2)	18 (4)	10 (5)	7 (2)	11 (3)	7 (3)	8 (3)	10 (1)	74 (78)
27	(Germany) Michael Schrey	(Germany) #511 FK Performance Motorsport	VT2-R+4WD	50 (2)	55 (2)	Ret	42 (2)	Ret	42 (2)	Ret		54 (3)	70
27	(Germany) Michael Schrey	(Germany) #187 FK Performance Motorsport	SP10	30 (1)	31 (1)						18 (1)		70
27	(Germany) Michael Schrey	(Germany) #178 FK Performance Motorsport	SP10			40 (7)						29 (2)	70
28=	(Germany) Aaron Wenisch	(Germany) #651 Adrenalin Motorsport Team Motec	BMW M240i	59 (4)	71 (5)	68 (5)	47 (3)	Ret	49 (2)	35 (2)	39 (2)	44 (3)	65 (69)
28=	(Germany) Marvin Marino	(Germany) #651 Adrenalin Motorsport Team Motec	BMW M240i	59 (4)	71 (5)	68 (5)	47 (3)	Ret	49 (2)	35 (2)	39 (2)	44 (3)	65 (69)
28=	(Germany) Marvin Marino	(Germany) #655 Adrenalin Motorsport Team Motec	BMW M240i						59 (3)				65 (69)
30	(Germany) Gerrit Holthaus (Germany) Marcus Willhardt	(Germany) #485 Hyundai Driving Experience	VT2-FWD	55 (2)	66 (2)	71 (3)	49 (1)	49 (1)	Ret				64
32	(Germany) Michael Sander	(Germany) #666 Schnitzelalm Racing	BMW M240i	48 (2)	58 (2)	57 (3)	Ret	Ret	Ret	34 (1)	77 (6)	41 (2)	63
32	(Germany) Michael Sander	(Germany) #674 Schnitzelalm Racing	BMW M240i		59 (3)							56 (5)	63
33	(Germany) Björn Simon	(Germany) #504 SRS Team Sorg Rennsport	VT2-R+4WD	68 (5)	61 (3)	63 (2)	Ret	50 (2)	54 (5)	41 (2)	46 (4)	66 (6)	62 (65)
34	(Italy) Eduardo Bugane	(Germany) #504 SRS Team Sorg Rennsport	VT2-R+4WD		61 (3)	63 (2)	Ret	50 (2)	54 (5)	41 (2)	46 (4)	66 (6)	61
35	(Italy) Michele di Martino	(Belgium) #124 Mühlner Motorsport	CUP2	66 (9)	23 (4)	20 (6)							61 (62)
35	(Italy) Michele di Martino	(Germany) #121 KKrämer Racing	CUP2				7 (3)	9 (4)	9 (2)	6 (2)		12 (3)	61 (62)
35	(Italy) Michele di Martino	(Germany) #112 KKrämer Racing	CUP2								Ret		61 (62)
36	(Switzerland) Ranko Mijatović	(Germany) #511 FK Performance Motorsport	VT2-R+4WD	50 (2)	55 (2)	Ret	42 (2)	Ret	42 (2)	Ret			60
36	(Switzerland) Ranko Mijatović	(Germany) #178 FK Performance Motorsport	SP10			40 (7)						29 (2)	60
36	(Switzerland) Ranko Mijatović	(Germany) #899 (Thomas Leyherr)	BMW M2 CS								43 (1)	82 (1)	60
37	(Norway) Sindre Setsås	(Germany) #511 FK Performance Motorsport	VT2-R+4WD	50 (2)	55 (2)	Ret	42 (2)	Ret	42 (2)	Ret		54 (3)	58
37	(Norway) Sindre Setsås	(Germany) #178 FK Performance Motorsport	SP10			40 (7)						29 (2)	58
38	(Germany) Timo Beuth	(Germany) #498 mathilda racing - Team LAVO Carwash	VT2-FWD	70 (3)	81 (6)	79 (5)	57 (5)	67 (5)	66 (3)	49 (3)	47 (3)	62 (2)	56 (63)
39	(Germany) Leon Dreiser	(Germany) #498 mathilda racing - Team LAVO Carwash	VT2-FWD	70 (3)	81 (6)	79 (5)		67 (5)	66 (3)	49 (3)	47 (3)	62 (2)	56 (59)
40	(Germany) Norbert Fischer	(Germany) #491 Zierau Hochvolt by Mertens Motorsport	VT2-FWD	54 (1)	75 (3)	70 (2)	50 (2)	57 (3)					55
41	(Germany) Anton Ruf	(Germany) #660 Smyrlis Racing	BMW M240i	53 (3)	64 (4)	56 (2)	40 (2)	59 (3)	Ret		Ret		52
41	(Germany) Anton Ruf	(Germany) #260 Smyrlis Racing	SP4T							36 (1)		91 (1)	52
42	(Germany) Marius Rauer (Germany) Moritz Oberheim	(Germany) #960 AVIA W&S Motorsport	CUP3	28 (2)	26 (1)	Ret	28 (4)	21 (2)	38 (10)	26 (5)	Ret	Ret	52
44	(Germany) Tim Scheerbarth	(Germany) #120 AVIA W&S Motorsport	CUP2	16 (1)	Ret	16 (2)	15 (8)	Ret			7 (2)	13 (4)	48
44	(Germany) Tim Scheerbarth	(Germany) #60 9und11 Racing	SP7						43 (1)	Ret			48
45	(Germany) Michael Tischner	(Germany) #170 Toyo Tires with Ring Racing	SP10	34 (3)	Ret	32 (3)	23 (2)	31 (3)	Ret	22 (2)	22 (2)		48
45	(Germany) Michael Tischner	(Germany) #171 Toyo Tires with Ring Racing	SP10									33 (4)	48
46	(Belgium) Aris Balanian	(Germany) #191 Walkenhorst Motorsport	SP10	Ret	56 (5)	52 (9)	22 (1)	26 (2)			30 (3)		47 (48)
46	(Belgium) Aris Balanian	(Germany) #187 FK Performance Motorsport	SP10						26 (1)	17 (1)			47 (48)
46	(Belgium) Aris Balanian	(Germany) #125 Huber Motorsport	CUP2									24 (10)	47 (48)
47	(Germany) Horst Baumann	(Germany) #950 Schmickler Performance (powered by Ravenol)	CUP3	Ret	42 (8)	30 (3)	20 (2)	24 (4)	29 (6)	Ret	19 (2)	31 (5)	47
48	(Germany) Finn Zulauf	(Germany) #960 AVIA W&S Motorsport	CUP3	28 (2)	26 (1)	Ret	28 (4)	21 (2)			Ret	Ret	46
49	(Germany) Roland Fröse	(Germany) #660 Smyrlis Racing	BMW M240i	53 (3)	64 (4)	56 (2)	40 (2)	59 (3)			Ret		46
49	(Germany) Roland Fröse	(Germany) #260 Smyrlis Racing	SP4T				37 (2)	40 (2)	39 (1)				46
49	(Germany) Roland Fröse	(Germany) #190 Teichmann Racing	SP10						Ret				46
50	(Israel) Moran Gott	(Germany) #504 SRS Team Sorg Rennsport	VT2-R+4WD	68 (5)	61 (3)	63 (2)	Ret						45
50	(Israel) Moran Gott	(Germany) #524 SRS Team Sorg Rennsport	VT2-R+4WD								38 (2)		45
50	(Israel) Moran Gott	(Germany) #505 QTQ-Raceperformance	VT2-R+4WD									48 (2)	45
51	(Germany) Paul Harkema	(Germany) #120 AVIA W&S Motorsport	CUP2	16 (1)	Ret	16 (2)	15 (8)	Ret			7 (2)	13 (4)	44
52	(Germany) Hans Joachim Theiß	(Germany) #514 SRS Team Sorg Rennsport	VT2-R+4WD	62 (4)	73 (5)	76 (4)	69 (7)	52 (3)	75 (8)	44 (3)	61 (6)	65 (5)	43 (46)
52	(Germany) Hans Joachim Theiß	(Germany) #969 SRS Team Sorg Rennsport	CUP3					66 (9)				87 (11)	43 (46)
53=	(Germany) Stefan Beyer	(Germany) #949 SRS Team Sorg Rennsport	CUP3	Ret	32 (4)	38 (5)	21 (3)	28 (5)	25 (3)	28 (6)	21 (4)	36 (8)	43 (44)
53=	(Germany) Carl-Friedrich Kolb	(Germany) #949 SRS Team Sorg Rennsport	CUP3	Ret	32 (4)	38 (5)	21 (3)	28 (5)	25 (3)	28 (6)	21 (4)	36 (8)	43 (44)
53=	(Germany) Carl-Friedrich Kolb	(Germany) #653 Team mcchip-dkr	BMW M240i					46 (2)					43 (44)
55	(Germany) Niclas Wiedmann (Finland) Philip Miemois	(Germany) #962 W&S Motorsport GmbH	CUP3	31 (4)	29 (3)	DNS	74 (7)	DNS	27 (4)	Ret	31 (8)	22 (1)	40
57	(Finland) Juha Miettinen (Sweden) Dan Berghult	(Finland) / (Sweden) #730 (BMW 325i)	V4	78 (1)	92 (2)	92 (1)	68 (4)	69 (3)	76 (1)	56 (2)	72 (3)	84 (6)	39 (44)
59	(Germany) Marcel Marchewicz	(Germany) #11 Schnitzelalm Racing	SP9 Pro	3 (3)	15 (15)	Ret	Ret	2 (2)	5 (5)	Ret	DNS		39
59	(Germany) Marcel Marchewicz	(Germany) #2 Schnitzelalm Racing	SP9 Pro-Am		Ret								39
59	(Germany) Marcel Marchewicz	(Germany) #666 Schnitzelalm Racing	BMW M240i						Ret	34 (1)		41 (2)	39
60	(Germany) Wolfgang Haugg	(Germany) #498 mathilda racing - Team LAVO Carwash	VT2-FWD	70 (3)	81 (6)	79 (5)	57 (5)		66 (3)	49 (3)			39
61	(Germany) Oliver Frisse (Germany) Danny Brink (Germany) Jürgen Huber	(Germany) #702 QTQ-Raceperformance	V4	Ret	88 (1)	93 (2)	62 (1)	Ret	77 (2)	55 (1)	Ret	92 (7)	36
64	(Germany) Maximilian Kurz	(Germany) #505 QTQ-Raceperformance	VT2-R+4WD	57 (3)	72 (4)	Ret	Ret	64 (7)	53 (4)	Ret		48 (2)	36
65	(Germany) Daniel Rexhausen	(Germany) #660 Smyrlis Racing	BMW M240i	53 (3)	64 (4)	56 (2)							34
65	(Germany) Daniel Rexhausen	(Germany) #662 Smyrlis Racing	BMW M240i						83 (5)				34
65	(Germany) Daniel Rexhausen	(Germany) #260 Smyrlis Racing	SP4T							36 (1)			34
66	(Germany) Alexander Müller	(Germany) #652 Adrenalin Motorsport Team Motec	BMW M240i	71 (5)		81 (6)	59 (5)		71 (4)	52 (4)			34 (36)
66	(Germany) Alexander Müller	(Germany) #160 Adrenalin Motorsport Team Motec	SP8T					42 (1)			48 (2)	45 (2)	34 (36)
67	(Germany) Christian Kraus	(Germany) #652 Adrenalin Motorsport Team Motec	BMW M240i	71 (5)	80 (6)	81 (6)	59 (5)		71 (4)	52 (4)			34 (39)
67	(Germany) Christian Kraus	(Germany) #655 Adrenalin Motorsport Team Motec	BMW M240i							Ret			34 (39)
67	(Germany) Christian Kraus	(Germany) #160 Adrenalin Motorsport Team Motec	SP8T					42 (1)			48 (2)	45 (2)	34 (39)
68	(Germany) Peter Terting	(Belgium) #123 Mühlner Motorsport	CUP2	17 (2)	DSQ	78 (13)	Ret	10 (5)		11 (5)	11 (6)	20 (9)	34
68	(Germany) Peter Terting	(Belgium) #124 Mühlner Motorsport	CUP2						14 (4)				34
69	(Belgium) Maxime Dumarey	(Germany) #17 PROsport-Racing	SP9 Am	15 (1)	22 (1)								33
69	(Belgium) Maxime Dumarey	(Germany) #17 PROsport-Racing	SP9 Pro-Am			14 (2)	3 (1)	4 (1)	Ret	3 (1)	Ret	9 (2)	33
70	(Germany) Niklas Öhme (Germany) Leonard Öhme (Germany) Moritz Öhme	(Germany) #944 Team Oehme	CUP3	35 (6)	38 (7)	41 (7)	Ret	34 (7)	28 (5)	23 (3)	23 (5)	30 (4)	33 (35)
73	(Germany) Ulrich Korn (Germany) Tobias Korn (Germany) Daniel Korn	(Germany) #444 Adrenalin Motorsport Team Motec	V5	76 (1)	77 (2)	104 (3)	Ret	51 (1)	58 (1)	51 (1)	DNS	63 (1)	32
76	(Brazil) Flavia Pellegrino Fernandes	(Germany) #467 MSC Kempenich e.V. im ADAC asBest Racing	VT2-FWD		100 (14)								32
76	(Brazil) Flavia Pellegrino Fernandes	(Germany) #466 Walkenhorst Motorsport	VT2-FWD			94 (10)	Ret						32
76	(Brazil) Flavia Pellegrino Fernandes	(Germany) #711 (BMW 325i)	V4					68 (2)					32
76	(Brazil) Flavia Pellegrino Fernandes	(Finland) / (Sweden) #730 (BMW 325i)	V4						76 (1)	56 (2)		84 (6)	32
76	(Brazil) Flavia Pellegrino Fernandes	(Germany) #750 (BMW 325i)	V4								69 (2)		32
77	(Germany) Stefan Kruse (Austria) David Griessner	(Germany) #930 Adrenalin Motorsport Team Motec	CUP3	33 (5)	33 (5)	34 (4)	Ret	29 (6)	32 (7)	25 (4)	26 (7)	35 (7)	31 (33)
79	(Germany) Claudius Karch	(Germany) #333 Schmickler Performance (powered by Ravenol)	SP3T	38 (1)	39 (1)	48 (1)	25 (1)	27 (1)	34 (1)		29 (1)	Ret	30
80	(Germany) Desiree Müller	(Germany) #711 (BMW 325i)	V4	86 (2)	103 (5)	100 (3)	65 (3)	68 (2)	79 (3)	60 (3)		83 (5)	30 (32)
81	(Germany) Tobias Overbeck	(Germany) #485 Hyundai Driving Experience	VT2-FWD	55 (2)	66 (2)	71 (3)							30
82	(Hungary) Adam Lengyel (Hungary) Bendeguz Molnar	(Hungary) #286 Car Competition Racing Team	SP3	63 (1)	91 (1)	90 (2)	55 (1)	DNQ	61 (1)	59 (1)			29
84	(Germany) Nick Salewsky (Germany) Tobias Vázquez-Garcia	(Belgium) #124 Mühlner Motorsport	CUP2	66 (9)	23 (4)	20 (6)	13 (7)	14 (8)	14 (4)		10 (5)	Ret	29 (30)
84	(Germany) Nick Salewsky (Germany) Tobias Vázquez-Garcia	(Belgium) #123 Mühlner Motorsport	CUP2							11 (5)			29 (30)
86	(Germany) Florian Wolf	(Germany) #930 Adrenalin Motorsport Team Motec	CUP3		33 (5)	34 (4)	Ret	29 (6)	32 (7)	25 (4)	26 (7)	35 (7)	29
87	(Germany) Lutz Rühl (Germany) Christian Büllesbach (Germany) Andreas Schettler	(Germany) #396 Adrenalin Motorsport Team Motec	V6	47 (1)	62 (1)	55 (1)	43 (1)	44 (1)	72 (2)	37 (1)	54 (2)	42 (1)	26 (32)
90	(Germany) Achim Wawer	(Germany) #333 Schmickler Performance (powered by Ravenol)	SP3T	38 (1)	39 (1)	48 (1)	25 (1)	27 (1)	34 (1)			Ret	26
91	(Germany) Frank Stippler	(Germany) #5 Scherer Sport PHX	SP9 Pro	Ret	49 (20)	7 (7)	4 (3)	Ret	Ret	Ret	3 (3)	1 (1)	26
92	(Germany) Markus Nölken	(Germany) #653 Team mcchip-dkr	BMW M240i		89 (7)	87 (7)		46 (2)	Ret	Ret	55 (4)	74 (8)	25
93	(Germany) Riccardo Petrolo	(Germany) #505 QTQ-Raceperformance	VT2-R+4WD	57 (3)	72 (4)	Ret	Ret	64 (7)	53 (4)	Ret			25
94	(Germany) Philipp Stahlschmidt	(Germany) #952 Smyrlis Racing	CUP3	29 (3)	107 (11)	26 (1)	DNS						24
95	(Belgium) Guido Dumarey	(Germany) #176 PROsport-racing	SP10	42 (6)	68 (6)		31 (4)		40 (3)	31 (4)	Ret	Ret	24
95	(Belgium) Guido Dumarey	(Germany) #175 PROsport-racing	SP10					33 (4)					24
96	(Germany) Pascal Fritzsche	(United Kingdom) #499 (Hyundai i30N)	VT2-FWD	73 (4)	84 (9)		66 (6)				53 (4)	64 (3)	24
97	(Belgium) "Brody" (Belgium) Jacques Derenne	(Belgium) #266 HYRacing-AMC Sankt Vith	SP4T	56 (1)	74 (1)	65 (1)	35 (1)	39 (1)	44 (2)	53 (2)	57 (2)		22 (24)
99	(Germany) Carsten Knechtges	(Germany) #333 Schmickler Performance (powered by Ravenol)	SP3T	38 (1)	39 (1)	48 (1)	25 (1)	27 (1)					21
100	(Germany) Guido Heinrich (Germany) Fabian Peitzmeier	(Germany) #260 Smyrlis Racing	SP4T	81 (2)	DNS	74 (2)	37 (2)	40 (2)	39 (1)	36 (1)	41 (1)	91 (1)	21 (23)
102	(Germany) Dennis Fetzer	(Germany) #25 Huber Motorsport	SP9 Pro-Am	20 (1)		99 (5)	8 (2)						21
102	(Germany) Dennis Fetzer	(Germany) #25 Huber Motorsport	SP9 Pro		20 (18)								21
102	(Germany) Dennis Fetzer	(Germany) #4 Falken Motorsports	SP9 Pro					DSQ	3 (3)				21
102	(Germany) Dennis Fetzer	(Germany) #125 Huber Motorsport	CUP2									24 (10)	21
103	(Italy) Edoardo Liberati (Estonia) Martin Rump	(Hong Kong) #47 KCMG	SP10	Ret	48 (4)	28 (1)							21
105	(Australia) Josh Burdon	(Hong Kong) #47 KCMG	SP10		48 (4)	28 (1)							21
106	(Luxembourg) Carlos Rivas	(Germany) #102 Black Falcon Team Identica	CUP2	Ret	19 (2)	18 (4)							21
106	(Luxembourg) Carlos Rivas	(Germany) #25 Huber Motorsport	SP9 Pro-Am				8 (2)						21
106	(Luxembourg) Carlos Rivas	(Germany) #125 Huber Motorsport	CUP2					25 (13)					21
107	(United States) Charlie Putman	(United States) #45 CP Racing	SP9 Pro-Am			23 (4)	16 (3)		12 (3)	10 (2)	DNS	14 (3)	21
108	(Germany) Ulrich Schmidt	(Germany) #490 Giti Tire Motorsport by WS Racing	VT2-FWD	79 (7)	86 (10)	98 (11)		72 (6)	73 (5)	61 (5)	70 (6)		21
109	(Germany) Reinhold Renger	(Germany) #189 Haupt Racing Team	SP10	36 (4)	DSQ	35 (5)	Ret						19
109	(Germany) Reinhold Renger	(Germany) #140 Black Falcon Team Textar	SP8T						23 (1)	21 (1)	Ret		19
109	(Germany) Reinhold Renger	(Germany) #142 Black Falcon Team Textar	SP8T									21 (1)	19
110	(Finland) Juuso Puhakka	(Germany) #666 Schnitzelalm Racing	BMW M240i	48 (2)		57 (3)							19
110	(Finland) Juuso Puhakka	(Germany) #2 Schnitzelalm Racing	SP9 Pro-Am		Ret								19
111	(Germany) Reiner Neuffer	(Germany) #63 PLUSLINE Racing Team	65 (1)	63 (1)	51 (1)	36 (2)	Ret	82 (2)	32 (1)	34 (3)	52 (3)	18 (20)	
112	(Germany) David Ackermann	(Germany) #410 MSC Adenau e.V. im ADAC	V6	60 (2)	Ret		54 (2)	48 (2)			60 (3)	58 (3)	18
112	(Germany) David Ackermann	(Germany) #600 DSK e.V.	H4			69 (1)			87 (1)				18
112	(Germany) David Ackermann	(Germany) #445 MSC Adenau e.V. im ADAC	V5								64 (2)		18
113	(Turkey) Emir Asari	(Germany) #10 Max Kruse Racing	SP3T	87 (2)	Ret	Ret	29 (2)	30 (2)	Ret	46 (1)	33 (2)	53 (2)	18
114	(Germany) Oliver Kriese	(Germany) #281 (Dacia Logan)	SP3	90 (2)	109 (4)	Ret							18 (19)
114	(Germany) Oliver Kriese	(Germany) #481 (Renault Mégane)	VT2-FWD				71 (8)	73 (7)	86 (8)	63 (6)	71 (7)	89 (7)	18 (19)
115	(Germany) Oliver Sprungmann	(Germany) #420 Four Motors Bioconcept-Car	AT(-G)		41 (2)	44 (1)		38 (1)	36 (2)	NC			17
116	(Germany) Holger Gachot	(Germany) #445 MSC Adenau e.V. im ADAC	V5	85 (2)	101 (4)	95 (2)	64 (1)	65 (2)					17
117	(Germany) Tobias Wahl	(Germany) #189 Haupt Racing Team	SP10	36 (4)	DSQ	35 (5)	Ret						16
117	(Germany) Tobias Wahl	(Germany) #140 Black Falcon Team Textar	SP8T						23 (1)	21 (1)	Ret		16
118	(Netherlands) Colin Caresani	(Germany) #665 Schnitzelalm Racing	BMW M240i	Ret									16
118	(Netherlands) Colin Caresani	(Germany) #666 Schnitzelalm Racing	BMW M240i		58 (2)								16
118	(Netherlands) Colin Caresani	(Germany) #674 Schnitzelalm Racing	BMW M240i		59 (3)								16
118	(Netherlands) Colin Caresani	(Germany) #11 Schnitzelalm Racing	SP9 Pro			Ret	Ret		5 (5)				16
119	(Austria) Constantin Schöll	(Germany) #180 Teichmann Racing	SP10	Ret	Ret	73 (10)					42 (4)	38 (5)	16
119	(Austria) Constantin Schöll	(Germany) #190 Teichmann Racing	SP10				24 (3)		Ret				16
120	(Switzerland) Mauro Calamia	(Germany) #962 W&S Motorsport GmbH	CUP3	31 (4)	29 (3)	DNS	74 (7)	DNS					16
121	(Belgium) Olivier Muytjens	(Belgium) #266 HYRacing-AMC Sankt Vith	SP4T		74 (1)	65 (1)	35 (1)		44 (2)	53 (2)			15
122	(Germany) Christian Heuchemer	(Germany) #400 Schmickler Performance powered by Ravenol	V6			66 (2)		62 (3)	47 (1)		50 (1)	50‡ (2)	15
123	(Germany) Matthias Wasel	(Germany) #10 Max Kruse Racing	SP3T	87 (2)	Ret	Ret	29 (2)	30 (2)	Ret	46 (1)	33 (2)		15
124	(Germany) Hans Wehrmann	(Germany) #125 Huber Motorsport	CUP2	26 (8)				25 (13)			15 (10)	24 (10)	15
124	(Germany) Hans Wehrmann	(Germany) #25 Huber Motorsport	SP9 Pro-Am				8 (2)		10 (2)	Ret			15
125	(Germany) Georg Goder (Germany) Ralf Öhme	(Germany) #65 9und11 Racing	SP7				34 (1)						14
125	(Germany) Georg Goder (Germany) Ralf Öhme	(Germany) #60 9und11 Racing	SP7					32 (1)	43 (1)	Ret		39 (2)	14
127	(Germany) Joachim Thyssen	(Germany) #25 Huber Motorsport	SP9 Pro-Am	20 (1)		99 (5)			10 (2)	Ret			14
128	(Germany) Georg Griesemann	(Germany) #190 Teichmann Racing	SP10	41 (5)	70 (7)								14
128	(Germany) Georg Griesemann	(Germany) #635 Griesemann Gruppe by TR Team	AT(-G)						62 (4)	30 (2)			14
129	(Germany) Marco Büsker	(Germany) #651 Adrenalin Motorsport Team Motec	BMW M240i	59 (4)	71 (5)	68 (5)							14
130	(Germany) Achim Feinen	(Germany) #488 SRS Team Sorg Rennsport	VT2-FWD	Ret					74 (6)	54 (4)		99 (9)	14
130	(Germany) Achim Feinen	(Germany) #969 SRS Team Sorg Rennsport	CUP3					66 (9)					14
131	(Germany) Dominik Fugel (Germany) Fidel Leib Jun.	(Germany) #105 ADAC Sachsen e.V. / Fugel Sport	CUP2	40 (8)	24 (5)	24 (8)	Ret	16 (10)	15 (5)	15 (9)	14 (9)	DNS	14
133	(Germany) Michael Heimrich (Germany) Lorenzo Rocco	(Germany) #50 équipe vitesse	SP9 Am		35 (2)		14 (1)	12 (1)	13 (1)	9 (1)			13
135	(Germany) Tim-Florian Wahl	(Germany) #931 Black Falcon Team Textar	CUP3	64 (9)									12
135	(Germany) Tim-Florian Wahl	(Germany) #932 Black Falcon Team Textar	CUP3		69 (10)	72 (10)							12
135	(Germany) Tim-Florian Wahl	(Germany) #189 Haupt Racing Team	SP10				Ret						12
135	(Germany) Tim-Florian Wahl	(Germany) #140 Black Falcon Team Textar	SP8T						23 (1)	21 (1)	Ret		12
135	(Germany) Tim-Florian Wahl	(Germany) #142 Black Falcon Team Textar	SP8T									21 (1)	12
136	(Germany) Kim-Luis Schramm	(Germany) #16 Scherer Sport PHX	SP9 Pro	2 (2)	47 (19)								12
137	(Germany) Bernd Kleeschulte	(Germany) #600 DSK e.V.	H4	Ret	57 (1)	69 (1)	39 (1)		87 (1)				11
138=	(Germany) Michael Ülwer	(Germany) #620 MSC Adenau e.V. im ADAC	H2	Ret									11
138=	(Germany) Michael Ülwer	(Germany) #270 MSC Adenau e.V. im ADAC	SP3		Ret	83 (1)	Ret	79 (1)	Ret				11
138=	(Germany) Stephan Epp	(Germany) #620 MSC Adenau e.V. im ADAC	H2	Ret									11
138=	(Germany) Stephan Epp	(Germany) #270 MSC Adenau e.V. im ADAC	SP3		Ret	83 (1)	Ret	79 (1)	Ret				11
138=	(Germany) Stephan Epp	(Germany) #833 (Audi RS 3 LMS TCR)	TCR		46 (1)								11
140	(Norway) Dr. Dr. Stein Tveten	(Germany) #733 Dr. Dr. Stein Tveten Motorsport	V4									73 (2)	11
141	(Germany) Dr. Anton Hahnenkamm	(Germany) #666 Schnitzelalm Racing	BMW M240i	48 (2)									11
142	(Germany) Janis Waldow (Germany) Moritz Wiskirchen (Turkey) Ersin Yücesan	(Germany) #177 Waldow Performance	SP10	32 (2)	Ret								11
145	(Germany) Vincent Kolb	(Germany) #5 Scherer Sport PHX	SP9 Pro	Ret		7 (7)	4 (3)	Ret	Ret	Ret	3 (3)		10
146	(Italy) Bruno Barbaro	(Belgium) #266 HYRacing-AMC Sankt Vith	SP4T	56 (1)	74 (1)			39 (1)					9
147	(Switzerland) Roger Vögeli (Germany) Mike Halder	(Germany) #807 Halder Motorsport	TCR	NC	Ret	64 (4)			NC	57 (1)	Ret		9
149	(Luxembourg) Sébastien Carcone	(Germany) #961 W&S Motorsport GmbH	CUP3	43 (8)	52 (10)	42 (8)	30 (5)	Ret	37 (9)	Ret		90 (9)	9
150	(Germany) Sebastian Schemmann	(Germany) #808 MSC Kempenich e.V. im ADAC asBest RACING	TCR					NC					8
150	(Germany) Sebastian Schemmann	(Germany) #800 MSC Emstal e.V. im ADAC	TCR						48 (1)			49 (2)	8
150	(Germany) Sebastian Schemmann	(Germany) #303 MSC Kempenich e.V. im ADAC asBest RACING	SP3T									46 (1)	8
151	(Germany) Stephan Brodmerkel	(Germany) #180 Teichmann Racing	SP10	Ret	Ret	73 (10)					42 (4)	38 (5)	8
151	(Germany) Stephan Brodmerkel	(Germany) #190 Teichmann Racing	SP10						Ret				8
152	(Germany) Benno Zerlin	(Germany) #691 Eifelkind Racing / MSC SINZIG e.V. im ADAC	BMW M240i	DNS		62 (4)	Ret	Ret	Ret			68 (7)	8
153	(Germany) René Höber	(Germany) #961 W&S Motorsport GmbH	CUP3	43 (8)	52 (10)	42 (8)	30 (5)	Ret				90 (9)	8
154	(United States) Cabell Fisher	(Germany) #931 Black Falcon Team Textar	CUP3	64 (9)	43 (9)	39 (6)	33 (6)	Ret				Ret	8
155	(Germany) Kurt Strube	(Germany) #488 SRS Team Sorg Rennsport	VT2-FWD			85 (7)	Ret		74 (6)		DNS	99 (9)	8
155	(Germany) Kurt Strube	(Germany) #969 SRS Team Sorg Rennsport	CUP3					66 (9)					8
156	(Germany) Carrie Schreiner	(Germany) #151 Giti Tire Motorsport by WS Racing	SP8T	Ret	44 (1)						35 (1)		7
156	(Germany) Carrie Schreiner	(Germany) #36 Walkenhorst Motorsport	SP9 Pro-Am						Ret	Ret			7
157=	(Germany) Jörg Schönfelder	(Germany) #250 MSG Bayerischer Wald Hutthurm e.V. im ADAC	SP4	Ret		102 (1)		Ret					7
157=	(Germany) Jörg Schönfelder	(Germany) #750 (BMW 325i)	V4						80 (4)				7
157=	(Germany) Serge van Vooren	(Germany) #250 MSG Bayerischer Wald Hutthurm e.V. im ADAC	SP4	Ret			72 (1)	Ret					7
157=	(Germany) Serge van Vooren	(Germany) #750 (BMW 325i)	V4						80 (4)				7
159	(Belgium) Jarno D'Hauw	(Germany) #466 Walkenhorst Motorsport	VT2-FWD	74 (5)	82 (7)	94 (10)							7
160	(Germany) Karsten Krämer	(Germany) #112 KKrämer Racing	CUP2	22 (5)	30 (7)	25 (9)			18 (8)	14 (8)		18 (7)	7
160	(Germany) Karsten Krämer	(Germany) #121 KKrämer Racing	CUP2	Ret									7
161	(Germany) Robin Chrzanowski (Germany) Kersten Jodexnis	(Germany) #119 Clickversicherung Team	CUP2	Ret	37 (8)	60 (12)			22 (9)	16 (10)	16 (10)	19 (8)	6
163	(Germany) Michael Eichhorn	(Germany) #494 Jung Motorsport	VT2-FWD	Ret	Ret	Ret			NC	65 (7)			5
163	(Germany) Michael Eichhorn	(France) #802 (Opel Astra)	TCR					Ret					5
163	(Germany) Michael Eichhorn	(Germany) #464 (Cupra Leon)	VT3								75 (1)		5
164	(Germany) Tobias Jung	(Germany) #494 Jung Motorsport	VT2-FWD	Ret	Ret	Ret	Ret		NC	65 (7)			5
164	(Germany) Tobias Jung	(Germany) #495 Jung Motorsport	VT2-FWD		93 (12)								5
164	(Germany) Tobias Jung	(France) #802 (Opel Astra)	TCR					Ret					5
164	(Germany) Tobias Jung	(Germany) #464 (Cupra Leon)	VT3								75 (1)		5
165	(Germany) Klaus Rader	(Germany) #25 Huber Motorsport	SP9 Pro-Am	20 (1)‡		99 (5)	8 (2)						5
166	(United Kingdom) Jim Cameron	(Germany) #113 Team Bill Cameron	CUP2		54 (9)	36 (10)	Ret	23 (12)	31 (11)	19 (11)			5
167	(Germany) Bill Cameron	(Germany) #113 Team Bill Cameron	CUP2		54 (9)	36 (10)		23 (12)	31 (11)	19 (11)			5
168	(Netherlands) Marco van Ramshorst	(Germany) #106 PB-Performance	CUP2			46 (11)		17 (11)	24 (10)	Ret	28 (11)	25 (10)	5
169	(Germany) Matthias Möller	(Germany) #500 Giti Tire Motorsport by WS Racing	VT2-R+4WD	80 (8)	106 (7)				Ret	DNS	68 (8)		4
170	(Germany) Lucian Gavris	(Germany) #636 (Subaru BRZ RR-AT)	AT(-G)			Ret						97 (1)	3
171	(Germany) Tim Schrick	(Germany) #636 (Subaru BRZ RR-AT)	AT(-G)			Ret						97 (1)	3
171	(Germany) Tim Schrick	(Germany) #263 STI	SP4T			Ret							3
172	(Germany) Jürgen Vöhringer	(Germany) #961 W&S Motorsport GmbH	CUP3			42 (8)							1

Colour	Result
Gold	Winner
Silver	Second place
Bronze	Third place
Green	Points classification
Blue	Non-points classification
Blue	Non-classified finish (NC)
Purple	Retired, not classified (Ret)
Red	Did not qualify (DNQ)
Red	Did not pre-qualify (DNPQ)
Black	Disqualified (DSQ)
White	Did not start (DNS)
White	Withdrew (WD)
White	Race cancelled (C)
Blank	Did not practice (DNP)
Blank	Did not arrive (DNA)
Blank	Excluded (EX)

(n) - Position in class

==== SP9 Pro ====
Pos.	Driver	Team	NLS1	NLS2	NLS3	NLS4	NLS5	NLS6	NLS7	NLS8	NLS9	Points
1	(Germany) Marcel Marchewicz	(Germany) #11 Schnitzelalm Racing	3 (3)	15 (15)	Ret	Ret	2 (2)	5 (5)	Ret	DNS		28
2	(Germany) Frank Stippler	(Germany) #5 Scherer Sport PHX	Ret	49 (20)	7 (7)	4 (3)	Ret	Ret	Ret	3 (3)	1 (1)	26
3	(Germany) Kim-Luis Schramm	(Germany) #16 Scherer Sport PHX	2 (2)	47 (19)								12
4	(Germany) Dennis Fetzer	(Germany) #25 Huber Motorsport		20 (18)								11
4	(Germany) Dennis Fetzer	(Germany) #4 Falken Motorsports					DSQ	3 (3)				11
5	(Germany) Vincent Kolb	(Germany) #5 Scherer Sport PHX	Ret		7 (7)	4 (3)	Ret	Ret	Ret	3 (3)		10
6	(Netherlands) Colin Caresani	(Germany) #11 Schnitzelalm Racing			Ret	Ret		5 (5)				5
Entries ineligible for championship
	(Poland) Jakub Giermaziak	(Germany) #34 Walkenhorst Motorsport	Ret	1 (1)	Ret	1 (1)	Ret	1 (1)	1 (1)	1 (1)	4 (4)	
	(Norway) Christian Krognes	(Germany) #34 Walkenhorst Motorsport				1 (1)	Ret	1 (1)	1 (1)	1 (1)	4 (4)	
	(United Kingdom) David Pittard	(Germany) #30 Frikadelli Racing Team		Ret	6 (6)					2 (2)		
	(United Kingdom) David Pittard	(Germany) #3 Falken Motorsports					1 (1)	2 (2)				
	(Belgium) Maxime Martin	(Germany) #99 ROWE Racing	1 (1)		2 (2)							
	(Belgium) Maxime Martin	(Germany) #98 ROWE Racing	Ret									
	(United Kingdom) Daniel Harper (Germany) Max Hesse (United States) Neil Verhagen	(Germany) #44 BMW Junior Team	5 (5)	3 (3)	1 (1)							
	(Germany) Christopher Mies	(Germany) #39 Audi Sport Team Land		8 (8)	3 (3)							
	(Germany) Christopher Mies	(Germany) #5 Scherer Sport PHX									1 (1)	
	(Belgium) Dries Vanthoor	(Germany) #98 ROWE Racing	Ret		4 (4)							
	(Belgium) Dries Vanthoor	(Germany) #99 ROWE Racing	1 (1)									
	(Sweden) Joel Eriksson	(Germany) #3 Falken Motorsports	12 (12)				1 (1)					
	(Sweden) Joel Eriksson	(Germany) #4 Falken Motorsports		9 (9)								
	(Finland) Jesse Krohn	(Germany) #34 Walkenhorst Motorsport		1 (1)	Ret							
	(France) Julien Andlauer	(Germany) #21 Rutronik Racing		2 (2)							3 (3)	
	(Austria) Klaus Bachler	(Germany) #3 Falken Motorsports		4 (4)				2 (2)				
	(Luxembourg) Dylan Pereira	(Germany) #35 Walkenhorst Motorsport				Ret	Ret	7 (6)	2 (2)	5 (5)	7 (6)	
	(Germany) Patrick Assenheimer	(Germany) #11 Schnitzelalm Racing		15 (15)	Ret		2 (2)	5 (5)				
	(Germany) Niklas Krütten	(Germany) #35 Walkenhorst Motorsport				Ret	Ret	7 (6)	2 (2)			
	(Germany) Marco Wittmann	(Germany) #98 ROWE Racing		6 (6)								
	(Germany) Marco Wittmann	(Germany) #99 ROWE Racing			2 (2)							
	(Germany) Felipe Fernández Laser	(Germany) #30 Frikadelli Racing Team			6 (6)					2 (2)		
	(Germany) Fabian Schiller	(Germany) #12 GetSpeed Performance		10 (10)	Ret							
	(Germany) Fabian Schiller	(Germany) #9 GetSpeed Performance / Mercedes-AMG Team GetSpeed			9 (9)						2 (2)	
	(Germany) Tim Neuser	(Germany) #11 Schnitzelalm Racing			Ret	Ret	2 (2)					
	(Netherlands) Nick Catsburg	(Germany) #30 Frikadelli Racing Team		Ret						2 (2)		
	(Switzerland) Ricardo Feller	(Germany) #16 Scherer Sport PHX	2 (2)									
	(Italy) Matteo Cairoli	(Germany) #21 Rutronik Racing		2 (2)								
	(Germany) Björn Grossmann (Switzerland) Jonathan Hirschi (Germany) Luca Ludwig	(Switzerland) #26 Octane126				2 (2)						
	(Austria) Lucas Auer	(Germany) #9 GetSpeed Performance / Mercedes-AMG Team GetSpeed									2 (2)	
	(Germany) Phil Dörr (Germany) Ben Dörr	(Germany) #24 Dörr Motorsport					3 (3)	4 (4)	4 (3)	4 (4)	6 (5)	
	(Switzerland) Patric Niederhauser	(Germany) #39 Audi Sport Team Land		8 (8)	3 (3)							
	(Switzerland) Patric Niederhauser	(Germany) #21 Rutronik Racing									3 (3)	
	(Denmark) Nicki Thiim	(Germany) #27 Abt Sportsline		13 (13)								
	(Denmark) Nicki Thiim	(Germany) #24 Dörr Motorsport						4 (4)	4 (3)			
	(Austria) Martin Ragginger	(Germany) #4 Falken Motorsports	9 (9)		8 (8)		DSQ	3 (3)				
	(Austria) Martin Ragginger	(Germany) #3 Falken Motorsports			5 (5)							
	(Germany) Christopher Haase	(Germany) #39 Audi Sport Team Land		8 (8)	3 (3)							
	(Germany) Marek Böckmann	(Germany) #11 Schnitzelalm Racing	3 (3)									
	(Germany) Marek Böckmann	(Germany) #37 PROsport-Racing									DNS	
	(United Kingdom) Darren Turner	(Germany) #24 Dörr Motorsport								4 (4)	6 (5)	
	(South Africa) Sheldon van der Linde	(Germany) #98 ROWE Racing		6 (6)	4 (4)							
	(Germany) Dennis Marschall	(Germany) #33 Audi Sport Team Car Collection	4 (4)		13 (12)							
	(Belgium) Alessio Picariello	(Germany) #3 Falken Motorsports		4 (4)							Ret	
	(Germany) Luca Engstler (Belgium) Gilles Magnus	(Germany) #33 Audi Sport Team Car Collection	4 (4)									
	(Finland) Sami-Matti Trogen	(Germany) #35 Walkenhorst Motorsport								5 (5)	7 (6)	
	(Austria) Thomas Preining	(Germany) #911 Manthey EMA	7 (7)	5 (5)								
	(Germany) Nico Menzel	(Germany) #4 Falken Motorsports	9 (9)		8 (8)						17 (8)	
	(Germany) Nico Menzel	(Germany) #3 Falken Motorsports			5 (5)							
	(Germany) Sven Müller	(Germany) #3 Falken Motorsports	12 (12)		5 (5)						Ret	
	(Germany) Sven Müller	(Germany) #4 Falken Motorsports			8 (8)							
	(Switzerland) Philip Ellis	(Germany) #8 Mercedes-AMG Team Bilstein		14 (14)								
	(Switzerland) Philip Ellis	(Germany) #11 Schnitzelalm Racing						5 (5)	Ret			
	(France) Kévin Estre	(Germany) #911 Manthey EMA		5 (5)								
	(Switzerland) Raffaele Marciello	(Germany) #8 Mercedes-AMG Team Bilstein	6 (6)	14 (14)	Ret							
	(Germany) Luca Stolz	(Germany) #8 Mercedes-AMG Team Bilstein	6 (6)	14 (14)								
	(United States) Connor De Phillippi	(Germany) #98 ROWE Racing		6 (6)								
	(Belgium) Frédéric Vervisch (Italy) Mattia Drudi	(Germany) #15 Audi Sport Team Scherer PHX		7 (7)	10 (10)							
	(Norway) Dennis Olsen	(Germany) #21 Rutronik Racing	13 (13)									
	(Norway) Dennis Olsen	(Italy) #18 Dinamic GT									8 (7)	
	(Austria) Marco Holzer	(Germany) #911 Manthey EMA	7 (7)									
	(Austria) Marco Holzer	(Germany) #21 Rutronik Racing			DSQ							
	(Denmark) Dennis Lind	(Germany) #15 Audi Sport Team Scherer PHX		7 (7)								
	(Belgium) Adrien De Leener	(Italy) #18 Dinamic GT									8 (7)	
	(Germany) Tim Heinemann	(Germany) #4 Falken Motorsports		9 (9)							17 (8)	
	(Italy) Marco Mapelli	(Germany) #27 Abt Sportsline	8 (8)	13 (13)								
	(South Africa) Kelvin van der Linde	(Germany) #27 Abt Sportsline	8 (8)									
	(United Kingdom) Adam Christodoulou	(Germany) #12 GetSpeed Performance		10 (10)	Ret							
	(United Kingdom) Adam Christodoulou	(Germany) #9 GetSpeed Performance / Mercedes-AMG Team GetSpeed			9 (9)							
	(India) Arjun Maini	(Germany) #6 Haupt Racing Team	11 (11)	16 (16)							85 (9)	
	(Germany) Maro Engel	(Germany) #9 GetSpeed Performance / Mercedes-AMG Team GetSpeed		Ret	9 (9)							
	(United Kingdom) Frank Bird (Estonia) Ralf Aron	(Germany) #6 Haupt Racing Team									85 (9)	
	(Germany) Leonard Weiss (Germany) Daniel Keilwitz	(Germany) #22 Wochenspiegel Team Monschau by Rinaldi Racing	10 (10)		11 (11)							
	(Germany) Maximilian Götz	(Germany) #12 GetSpeed Performance		10 (10)	Ret							
	(Germany) Jochen Krumbach	(Germany) #22 Wochenspiegel Team Monschau by Rinaldi Racing	10 (10)									
	(Germany) Timo Scheider	(Germany) #15 Audi Sport Team Scherer PHX			10 (10)							
	(Australia) Jordan Love	(Germany) #6 Haupt Racing Team	11 (11)	16 (16)								
	(Australia) Jordan Love	(Germany) #8 Mercedes-AMG Team Bilstein			Ret							
	(Germany) Hubert Haupt	(Germany) #6 Haupt Racing Team	11 (11)	16 (16)								
	(Germany) Laurin Heinrich	(Italy) #18 Dinamic GT	Ret	11 (11)								
	(Belgium) Laurens Vanthoor	(Italy) #18 Dinamic GT		11 (11)								
	(Netherlands) Indy Dontje	(Germany) #22 Wochenspiegel Team Monschau by Rinaldi Racing			11 (11)							
	(France) Thomas Neubauer	(Germany) #35 Walkenhorst Motorsport	37 (15)	12 (12)	Ret	Ret	Ret					
	(Germany) Jens Klingmann	(Germany) #35 Walkenhorst Motorsport		12 (12)	Ret							
	(Austria) Max Hofer	(Germany) #33 Audi Sport Team Car Collection			13 (12)							
	(Germany) Tobias Müller	(Germany) #21 Rutronik Racing	13 (13)		DSQ							
	(South Africa) Jordan Pepper	(Germany) #27 Abt Sportsline		13 (13)								
	(Germany) Mike David Ortmann	(Germany) #37 PROsport-Racing	14 (14)								DNS	
	(United Kingdom) Jake Dennis	(Germany) #35 Walkenhorst Motorsport	37 (15)		Ret							
	(Canada) Mikaël Grenier	(Germany) #11 Schnitzelalm Racing		15 (15)								
	(Zimbabwe) Axcil Jefferies (Netherlands) Yelmer Buurman	(Germany) #7 Konrad Motorsport		17 (17)								
	(France) Côme Ledogar (Germany) Lars Kern	(Germany) #25 Huber Motorsport		20 (18)								
	(Germany) Markus Winkelhock	(Germany) #16 Scherer Sport PHX		47 (19)	Ret							
	(Germany) Markus Winkelhock	(Germany) #5 Scherer Sport PHX		49 (20)								
	(Italy) Michele Beretta	(Germany) #16 Scherer Sport PHX		47 (19)	Ret							
	(Netherlands) Renger van der Zande	(Germany) #5 Scherer Sport PHX		49 (20)								
	(Germany) Luca-Sandro Trefz (Germany) Kenneth Heyer	(Germany) #11 Schnitzelalm Racing							Ret	DNS		
	(Spain) Andy Soucek	(Germany) #34 Walkenhorst Motorsport	Ret									
	(Germany) Maximilian Hackländer	(Germany) #7 Konrad Motorsport	Ret									
	(Germany) Christian Engelhart (Turkey) Ayhancan Güven	(Italy) #18 Dinamic GT	Ret									
	(Austria) Philipp Eng (Brazil) Augusto Farfus Jr. (United Kingdom) Nick Yelloly	(Germany) #99 ROWE Racing		Ret								
	(New Zealand) Earl Bamber	(Germany) #30 Frikadelli Racing Team		Ret								
	(France) Jules Gounon (Spain) Daniel Juncadella	(Germany) #9 GetSpeed Performance / Mercedes-AMG Team GetSpeed		Ret								
	(Germany) Patrick Kolb (Germany) Marco Seefried	(Germany) #42 Lionspeed by Car Collection Motorsport			Ret							
	(Germany) Nico Bastian	(Germany) #37 PROsport-Racing									DNS	

Colour	Result
Gold	Winner
Silver	Second place
Bronze	Third place
Green	Points classification
Blue	Non-points classification
Blue	Non-classified finish (NC)
Purple	Retired, not classified (Ret)
Red	Did not qualify (DNQ)
Red	Did not pre-qualify (DNPQ)
Black	Disqualified (DSQ)
White	Did not start (DNS)
White	Withdrew (WD)
White	Race cancelled (C)
Blank	Did not practice (DNP)
Blank	Did not arrive (DNA)
Blank	Excluded (EX)

(n) - Position in class

==== SP9 Pro-Am ====
Pos.	Driver	Team	NLS1	NLS2	NLS3	NLS4	NLS5	NLS6	NLS7	NLS8	NLS9	Points
1	(Belgium) Maxime Dumarey	(Germany) #17 PROsport-Racing			14 (2)	3 (1)	4 (1)	Ret	3 (1)	Ret	9 (2)	28
2	(United States) Charlie Putman	(United States) #45 CP Racing			23 (4)	16 (3)		12 (3)	10 (2)	DNS	14 (3)	21
3	(Germany) Joachim Thyssen	(Germany) #25 Huber Motorsport	20 (1)		99 (5)			10 (2)	Ret			14
4	(Germany) Hans Wehrmann	(Germany) #25 Huber Motorsport				8 (2)		10 (2)	Ret			11
5	(Germany) Dennis Fetzer	(Germany) #25 Huber Motorsport	20 (1)		99 (5)	8 (2)						9
6	(Germany) Klaus Rader	(Germany) #25 Huber Motorsport	20 (1)‡		99 (5)	8 (2)						5
7	(Luxembourg) Carlos Rivas	(Germany) #25 Huber Motorsport				8 (2)						3
Entries ineligible for championship
	(Germany) Mike David Ortmann	(Germany) #17 PROsport-Racing			14 (2)	3 (1)	4 (1)				9 (2)	
	(Germany) Christian Kohlhaas	(Germany) #19 racing one		DNS	12 (1)		6 (2)	6 (1)	Ret	Ret		
	(Germany) Stefan Aust	(Germany) #19 racing one			12 (1)			6 (1)	Ret	Ret		
	(Germany) Luca Ludwig	(Germany) #19 racing one			12 (1)			6 (1)	Ret			
	(United States) Charles Espenlaub (United States) Shane Lewis	(United States) #45 CP Racing	24 (3)	25 (1)	23 (4)	16 (3)		12 (3)	10 (2)	DNS	14 (3)	
	(Germany) Marek Böckmann	(Germany) #17 PROsport-Racing						Ret	3 (1)	Ret	9 (2)	
	(Germany) Christoph Breuer	(Germany) #17 PROsport-Racing			14 (2)			Ret	3 (1)			
	(Germany) "Jacob Schell"	(Germany) #19 racing one						6 (1)	Ret	Ret		
	(Germany) Florian Spengler (Germany) Marcus Winkelhock	(Germany) #20 Car Collection Motorsport									5 (1)	
	(United Kingdom) Adam Christodoulou	(United States) #45 CP Racing						12 (3)	10 (2)		14 (3)	
	(New Zealand) Jaxon Evans	(Germany) #25 Huber Motorsport						10 (2)	Ret			
	(Germany) Klaus Abbelen	(Germany) #30 Frikadelli Racing Team	21 (2)								Ret	
	(Zimbabwe) Axcil Jefferies	(Germany) #19 racing one					6 (2)					
	(Germany) Felipe Fernández Laser	(Germany) #30 Frikadelli Racing Team	21 (2)									
	(Belgium) Maxime Soulet	(United States) #45 CP Racing	24 (3)		23 (4)							
	(Germany) Peter Posavac	(Germany) #2 Schnitzelalm Racing		Ret								
	(Germany) Peter Posavac	(Germany) #36 Walkenhorst Motorsport			22 (3)				Ret			
	(Germany) Jörg Breuer	(Germany) #36 Walkenhorst Motorsport			22 (3)			Ret				
	(Germany) Henry Walkenhorst	(Germany) #36 Walkenhorst Motorsport			22 (3)							
	(France) Côme Ledogar	(Germany) #25 Huber Motorsport			99 (5)							
	(Germany) Carrie Schreiner (Belgium) Charles Weerts (Germany) Christian Bollrath	(Germany) #36 Walkenhorst Motorsport						Ret	Ret			
	(Germany) Jochen Krumbach (Germany) Leonard Weiss (Netherlands) Indy Dontje	(Germany) #22 Wochenspiegel Team Monschau by Rinaldi Racing		Ret								
	(Germany) Kenneth Heyer (Germany) Marcel Marchewicz (Finland) Juuso Puhakka	(Germany) #2 Schnitzelalm Racing		Ret								
	(United Kingdom) David Pittard	(Germany) #30 Frikadelli Racing Team									Ret	
	(United Kingdom) Jody Fannin	(Germany) #19 racing one		DNS								

‡: Result not counted for classification

Colour	Result
Gold	Winner
Silver	Second place
Bronze	Third place
Green	Points classification
Blue	Non-points classification
Blue	Non-classified finish (NC)
Purple	Retired, not classified (Ret)
Red	Did not qualify (DNQ)
Red	Did not pre-qualify (DNPQ)
Black	Disqualified (DSQ)
White	Did not start (DNS)
White	Withdrew (WD)
White	Race cancelled (C)
Blank	Did not practice (DNP)
Blank	Did not arrive (DNA)
Blank	Excluded (EX)

(n) - Position in class

==== SP9 Am ====
Pos.	Driver	Team	NLS1	NLS2	NLS3	NLS4	NLS5	NLS6	NLS7	NLS8	NLS9	Points
1	(Germany) Michael Heimrich (Germany) Lorenzo Rocco	(Germany) #50 équipe vitesse		35 (2)		14 (1)	12 (1)	13 (1)	9 (1)			13
3	(Belgium) Maxime Dumarey	(Germany) #17 PROsport-Racing	15 (1)	22 (1)								5
Entries ineligible for championship
	(Germany) Arno Klasen	(Germany) #50 équipe vitesse		35 (2)		14 (1)	12 (1)	13 (1)	9 (1)			
	(Germany) Christoph Breuer	(Germany) #17 PROsport-Racing	15 (1)	22 (1)								

Colour	Result
Gold	Winner
Silver	Second place
Bronze	Third place
Green	Points classification
Blue	Non-points classification
Blue	Non-classified finish (NC)
Purple	Retired, not classified (Ret)
Red	Did not qualify (DNQ)
Red	Did not pre-qualify (DNPQ)
Black	Disqualified (DSQ)
White	Did not start (DNS)
White	Withdrew (WD)
White	Race cancelled (C)
Blank	Did not practice (DNP)
Blank	Did not arrive (DNA)
Blank	Excluded (EX)

(n) - Position in class

==== SP10 ====
Pos.	Driver	Team	NLS1	NLS2	NLS3	NLS4	NLS5	NLS6	NLS7	NLS8	NLS9	Points
1	(Germany) Thorsten Wolter (Germany) Nick Wüstenhagen	(Germany) #187 FK Performance Motorsport	30 (1)	31 (1)	29 (2)	Ret	20 (1)	26 (1)	17 (1)	18 (1)	26 (1)	82 (90)
3	(Germany) Michael Tischner	(Germany) #170 Toyo Tires with Ring Racing	34 (3)	Ret	32 (3)	23 (2)	31 (3)	Ret	22 (2)	22 (2)		48
3	(Germany) Michael Tischner	(Germany) #171 Toyo Tires with Ring Racing									33 (4)	48
4	(Belgium) Aris Balanian	(Germany) #191 Walkenhorst Motorsport	Ret	56 (5)	52 (9)	22 (1)	26 (2)			30 (3)		47
4	(Belgium) Aris Balanian	(Germany) #187 FK Performance Motorsport						26 (1)	17 (1)			47
5	(Germany) Michael Schrey	(Germany) #187 FK Performance Motorsport	30‡ (1)	31 (1)						18 (1)		34
5	(Germany) Michael Schrey	(Germany) #178 FK Performance Motorsport			40‡ (7)						29 (2)	34
6	(Belgium) Guido Dumarey	(Germany) #176 PROsport-racing	42 (6)	68 (6)		31 (4)		40 (3)	31 (4)	Ret	Ret	24
6	(Belgium) Guido Dumarey	(Germany) #175 PROsport-racing					33 (4)					24
7=	(Italy) Edoardo Liberati (Estonia) Martin Rump	(Hong Kong) #47 KCMG	Ret	48 (4)	28 (1)							21
7=	(Australia) Josh Burdon	(Hong Kong) #47 KCMG		48 (4)	28 (1)							21
10	(Austria) Constantin Schöll	(Germany) #180 Teichmann Racing	Ret	Ret	73 (10)					42 (4)	38 (5)	16
10	(Austria) Constantin Schöll	(Germany) #190 Teichmann Racing				24 (3)		Ret				16
11=	(Switzerland) Ranko Mijatović (Norway) Sindre Setsås	(Germany) #178 FK Performance Motorsport			40‡ (7)						29 (2)	11
11=	(Germany) Janis Waldow (Germany) Moritz Wiskirchen (Turkey) Ersin Yücesan	(Germany) #177 Waldow Performance	32 (2)	Ret								11
16	(Germany) Tobias Wahl (Germany) Reinhold Renger	(Germany) #189 Haupt Racing Team	36 (4)	DSQ	35 (5)	Ret						10
18	(Germany) Stephan Brodmerkel	(Germany) #180 Teichmann Racing	Ret	Ret	73 (10)					42 (4)	38 (5)	8
18	(Germany) Stephan Brodmerkel	(Germany) #190 Teichmann Racing						Ret				8
19	(Germany) Georg Griesemann	(Germany) #190 Teichmann Racing	41 (5)	70 (7)								6
Entries ineligible for championship
	(Germany) Nick Hancke	(Germany) #187 FK Performance Motorsport			29 (2)	Ret		26 (1)	17 (1)		26 (1)	
	(Germany) Florian Weber	(Germany) #191 Walkenhorst Motorsport	Ret	56 (5)	52 (9)	22 (1)	26 (2)					
	(United States) Ace Robey	(Germany) #191 Walkenhorst Motorsport	Ret	56 (5)		22 (1)	26 (2)					
	(Germany) Christian Konnerth	(Germany) #178 FK Performance Motorsport			40 (7)						29 (2)	
	(Germany) Christian Konnerth	(Germany) #187 FK Performance Motorsport					20 (1)					
	(Germany) Heiko Tönges	(Germany) #170 Toyo Tires with Ring Racing	34 (3)	Ret		23 (2)	31 (3)	Ret	22 (2)	22 (2)	71 (6)	
	(Germany) Heiko Tönges	(Germany) #171 Toyo Tires with Ring Racing			37 (6)							
	(Germany) Andreas Gülden	(Germany) #170 Toyo Tires with Ring Racing	34 (3)	Ret	32 (3)			Ret	22 (2)	22 (2)	71 (6)	
	(Germany) Tim Sandtler	(Germany) #171 Toyo Tires with Ring Racing		45 (3)	37 (6)			30 (2)	27 (3)			
	(Germany) Tim Sandtler	(Germany) #170 Toyo Tires with Ring Racing					31 (3)				71 (6)	
	(Japan) Takayuki Kinoshita	(Germany) #171 Toyo Tires with Ring Racing		45 (3)	37 (6)			30 (2)	27 (3)		33 (4)	
	(Germany) Marc Hennerici	(Germany) #171 Toyo Tires with Ring Racing						30 (2)	27 (3)		33 (4)	
	(Germany) Uwe Kleen	(Germany) #170 Toyo Tires with Ring Racing				23 (2)	31 (3)					
	(Belgium) Guillaume Dumarey	(Germany) #175 PROsport-racing		34 (2)	47 (8)							
	(Germany) Mike David Ortmann	(Germany) #175 PROsport-racing		34 (2)								
	(Germany) Lance David Arnold	(Germany) #171 Toyo Tires with Ring Racing		45 (3)								
	(Germany) Lance David Arnold	(Germany) #170 Toyo Tires with Ring Racing			32 (3)							
	(France) Célia Martin	(Germany) #176 PROsport-racing				31 (4)				Ret		
	(France) Célia Martin	(Germany) #175 PROsport-racing									32 (3)	
	(Germany) Rudi Adams (Germany) Michael Hess	(Germany) #176 PROsport-racing						40 (3)	31 (4)			
	(United Kingdom) Scott Marshall	(Germany) #190 Teichmann Racing	41 (5)	70 (7)	Ret	24 (3)		Ret				
	(Germany) Hugo Sasse	(Germany) #175 PROsport-racing			47 (8)						32 (3)	
	(Germany) Bennet Ehrl	(Germany) #191 Walkenhorst Motorsport								30 (3)		
	(Liechtenstein) Fabienne Wohlwend	(Germany) #175 PROsport-racing									32 (3)	
	(Germany) Hendrik Still	(Germany) #180 Teichmann Racing	Ret		73 (10)					42 (4)	38 (5)	
	(Ukraine) Yevgen Sokolovskiy	(Germany) #176 PROsport-racing	42 (6)	68 (6)							Ret	
	(Ukraine) Yevgen Sokolovskiy	(Germany) #175 PROsport-racing					33 (4)					
	(Germany) "Max" (Germany) "Jens"	(Germany) #164 W&S Motorsport			33 (4)							
	(Germany) Yves Volte	(Germany) #190 Teichmann Racing	41 (5)	70 (7)								
	(Romania) Alexandru Vasilescu	(Romania) #193 (BMW M4 GT4)				76 (5)						
	(Czech Republic) Gabriela Jílkova	(Germany) #176 PROsport-racing	42 (6)									
	(New Zealand) Tony Richards (Netherlands) Maxime Oosten	(Germany) #178 FK Performance Motorsport			40 (7)							
	(Germany) Felix von der Laden	(Germany) #190 Teichmann Racing			Ret							
	(Germany) Tim-Florian Wahl	(Germany) #189 Haupt Racing Team				Ret						
	(Germany) Roland Fröse	(Germany) #190 Teichmann Racing						Ret				

‡: Result not counted for classification

Colour	Result
Gold	Winner
Silver	Second place
Bronze	Third place
Green	Points classification
Blue	Non-points classification
Blue	Non-classified finish (NC)
Purple	Retired, not classified (Ret)
Red	Did not qualify (DNQ)
Red	Did not pre-qualify (DNPQ)
Black	Disqualified (DSQ)
White	Did not start (DNS)
White	Withdrew (WD)
White	Race cancelled (C)
Blank	Did not practice (DNP)
Blank	Did not arrive (DNA)
Blank	Excluded (EX)

(n) - Position in class

==== SP8T ====
Pos.	Driver	Team	NLS1	NLS2	NLS3	NLS4	NLS5	NLS6	NLS7	NLS8	NLS9	Points
1	(Germany) Tim-Florian Wahl (Germany) Reinhold Renger	(Germany) #140 Black Falcon Team Textar						23 (1)	21 (1)	Ret		9
1	(Germany) Tim-Florian Wahl (Germany) Reinhold Renger	(Germany) #142 Black Falcon Team Textar									21 (1)	9
3	(Germany) Christian Kraus (Germany) Alexander Müller	(Germany) #160 Adrenalin Motorsport Team Motec					42 (1)			48 (2)	45 (2)	9
5	(Germany) Carrie Schreiner	(Germany) #151 Giti Tire Motorsport by WS Racing	Ret	44 (1)						35 (1)		7
6	(Germany) Tobias Wahl	(Germany) #140 Black Falcon Team Textar						23 (1)	21 (1)	Ret		6
Entries ineligible for championship
	(Germany) Ben Dörr	(Germany) #150 Dörr Motorsport	44 (1)	111 (2)	89 (1)							
	(Germany) Lars Harbeck (Switzerland) Michelangelo Comazzi	(Germany) #160 Adrenalin Motorsport Team Motec					42 (1)			48 (2)	45 (2)	
	(France) Théo Nouet	(Germany) #150 Dörr Motorsport	44 (1)	111 (2)								
	(Netherlands) Beitske Visser	(Germany) #151 Giti Tire Motorsport by WS Racing	Ret				Ret			35 (1)		
	(France) Célia Martin	(Germany) #151 Giti Tire Motorsport by WS Racing		44 (1)			Ret					
	(United Kingdom) Pippa Mann	(Germany) #151 Giti Tire Motorsport by WS Racing		44 (1)								
	(Germany) Stefan Kenntemich (Germany) Rudi Adams	(Germany) #150 Dörr Motorsport			89 (1)							
	(Liechtenstein) Fabienne Wohlwend	(Germany) #151 Giti Tire Motorsport by WS Racing	Ret				Ret					

‡: Result not counted for classification

Colour	Result
Gold	Winner
Silver	Second place
Bronze	Third place
Green	Points classification
Blue	Non-points classification
Blue	Non-classified finish (NC)
Purple	Retired, not classified (Ret)
Red	Did not qualify (DNQ)
Red	Did not pre-qualify (DNPQ)
Black	Disqualified (DSQ)
White	Did not start (DNS)
White	Withdrew (WD)
White	Race cancelled (C)
Blank	Did not practice (DNP)
Blank	Did not arrive (DNA)
Blank	Excluded (EX)

(n) - Position in class

==== SP7 ====
Pos.	Driver	Team	NLS1	NLS2	NLS3	NLS4	NLS5	NLS6	NLS7	NLS8	NLS9	Points
1	(Germany) Reiner Neuffer	(Germany) #63 PLUSLINE Racing Team	65 (1)	63 (1)	51 (1)	36 (2)	Ret	82 (2)	32 (1)	34 (3)	52 (3)	18 (20)
2	(Germany) Georg Goder (Germany) Ralf Öhme	(Germany) #65 9und11 Racing				34 (1)						14
2	(Germany) Georg Goder (Germany) Ralf Öhme	(Germany) #60 9und11 Racing					32 (1)	43 (1)	Ret		39 (2)	14
4	(Germany) Tim Scheerbarth	(Germany) #60 9und11 Racing						43 (1)	Ret			4
Entries ineligible for championship
	(Germany) Fabio Sacchi	(Germany) #63 PLUSLINE Racing Team		63 (1)	51 (1)	36 (2)	Ret	82 (2)	32 (1)	34 (3)	52 (3)	
	(Germany) Martin Schlüter	(Germany) #65 9und11 Racing				34 (1)						
	(Germany) Martin Schlüter	(Germany) #60 9und11 Racing					32 (1)	43 (1)	Ret		39 (2)	
	(Norway) Torleif Nytroen	(Germany) #67 Teichmann Racing								25 (1)	27 (1)	
	(Czech Republic) Milan Kodídek (Germany) Tim Breidenbach	(Germany) #58 RPM Racing								32 (2)		
	(Germany) Heinz Dolfen (Germany) Olaf Baunack (Germany) Karl-Heinz Meyer	(Germany) #974 KKrämer Racing	75 (2)									
	(Germany) Christian Knötschke	(Germany) #63 PLUSLINE Racing Team					Ret					

Colour	Result
Gold	Winner
Silver	Second place
Bronze	Third place
Green	Points classification
Blue	Non-points classification
Blue	Non-classified finish (NC)
Purple	Retired, not classified (Ret)
Red	Did not qualify (DNQ)
Red	Did not pre-qualify (DNPQ)
Black	Disqualified (DSQ)
White	Did not start (DNS)
White	Withdrew (WD)
White	Race cancelled (C)
Blank	Did not practice (DNP)
Blank	Did not arrive (DNA)
Blank	Excluded (EX)

(n) - Position in class

==== SP4 ====
Pos.	Driver	Team	NLS1	NLS2	NLS3	NLS4	NLS5	NLS6	NLS7	NLS8	NLS9	Points
1=	(Germany) Jörg Schönfelder	(Germany) #250 MSG Bayerischer Wald Hutthurm e.V. im ADAC	Ret		102 (1)		Ret					3
1=	(Germany) Serge van Vooren	(Germany) #250 MSG Bayerischer Wald Hutthurm e.V. im ADAC	Ret			72 (1)	Ret					3
Entries ineligible for championship
	(Germany) Thorsten Köppert	(Germany) #254 (BMW 325i)			106 (2)	73 (2)	74 (1)	84 (1)	62 (1)			
	(Germany) Ingo Öpen	(Germany) #254 (BMW 325i)			106 (2)		74 (1)		62 (1)			
	(Germany) Henrik Launhardt	(Germany) #254 (BMW 325i)				73 (2)		84 (1)	62 (1)			
	(Germany) Christian Schotte	(Germany) #250 MSG Bayerischer Wald Hutthurm e.V. im ADAC			102 (1)	72 (1)	Ret					
	(Germany) Ralph Hengesbach	(Germany) #254 (BMW 325i)				73 (2)		84 (1)				
	(Germany) Klaus Müller	(Germany) #254 (BMW 325i)					74 (1)					
	(Germany) Bernd Küpper (Germany) Kevin Küpper (Germany) Joseph Moore	(Germany) #252 Dürener MSC e.V. im ADAC		110 (1)								

Colour	Result
Gold	Winner
Silver	Second place
Bronze	Third place
Green	Points classification
Blue	Non-points classification
Blue	Non-classified finish (NC)
Purple	Retired, not classified (Ret)
Red	Did not qualify (DNQ)
Red	Did not pre-qualify (DNPQ)
Black	Disqualified (DSQ)
White	Did not start (DNS)
White	Withdrew (WD)
White	Race cancelled (C)
Blank	Did not practice (DNP)
Blank	Did not arrive (DNA)
Blank	Excluded (EX)

(n) - Position in class

==== SP4T ====
Pos.	Driver	Team	NLS1	NLS2	NLS3	NLS4	NLS5	NLS6	NLS7	NLS8	NLS9	Points
1	(Belgium) "Brody" (Belgium) Jacques Derenne	(Belgium) #266 HYRacing-AMC Sankt Vith	56 (1)	74 (1)	65 (1)	35 (1)	39 (1)	44 (2)	53 (2)	57 (2)		22 (24)
3	(Germany) Guido Heinrich (Germany) Fabian Peitzmeier	(Germany) #260 Smyrlis Racing	81 (2)	DNS	74 (2)	37 (2)	40 (2)	39 (1)	36 (1)	41 (1)	91 (1)	21 (23)
5	(Belgium) Olivier Muytjens	(Belgium) #266 HYRacing-AMC Sankt Vith		74 (1)	65 (1)	35 (1)		44 (2)	53 (2)			15
6	(Italy) Bruno Barbaro	(Belgium) #266 HYRacing-AMC Sankt Vith	56 (1)	74 (1)			39 (1)					9
7	(Germany) Anton Ruf	(Germany) #260 Smyrlis Racing							36 (1)		91 (1)	6
8	(Germany) Daniel Rexhausen	(Germany) #260 Smyrlis Racing							36 (1)			4
Entries ineligible for championship
	(Germany) Roland Fröse	(Germany) #260 Smyrlis Racing				37 (2)	40 (2)	39 (1)				
	(Germany) Harald Rettich	(Belgium) #266 HYRacing-AMC Sankt Vith							53 (2)			
	(Netherlands) Carlo van Dam (Germany) Tim Schrick	(Germany) #263 STI			Ret							

Colour	Result
Gold	Winner
Silver	Second place
Bronze	Third place
Green	Points classification
Blue	Non-points classification
Blue	Non-classified finish (NC)
Purple	Retired, not classified (Ret)
Red	Did not qualify (DNQ)
Red	Did not pre-qualify (DNPQ)
Black	Disqualified (DSQ)
White	Did not start (DNS)
White	Withdrew (WD)
White	Race cancelled (C)
Blank	Did not practice (DNP)
Blank	Did not arrive (DNA)
Blank	Excluded (EX)

(n) - Position in class

==== SP3T ====
Pos.	Driver	Team	NLS1	NLS2	NLS3	NLS4	NLS5	NLS6	NLS7	NLS8	NLS9	Points
1	(Germany) Claudius Karch	(Germany) #333 Schmickler Performance (powered by Ravenol)	38 (1)	39 (1)	48 (1)	25 (1)	27 (1)	34 (1)		29 (1)	Ret	30
2	(Germany) Achim Wawer	(Germany) #333 Schmickler Performance (powered by Ravenol)	38 (1)	39 (1)	48 (1)	25 (1)	27 (1)	34 (1)			Ret	26
3	(Germany) Carsten Knechtges	(Germany) #333 Schmickler Performance (powered by Ravenol)	38 (1)	39 (1)	48 (1)	25 (1)	27 (1)					21
4	(Turkey) Emir Asari	(Germany) #10 Max Kruse Racing	87 (2)	Ret	Ret	29 (2)	30 (2)	Ret	46 (1)	33 (2)	53 (2)	18
5	(Germany) Matthias Wasel	(Germany) #10 Max Kruse Racing	87 (2)	Ret	Ret	29 (2)	30 (2)	Ret	46 (1)	33 (2)		15
Entries ineligible for championship
	(Germany) Jens Wulf (Germany) Meik Utsch	(Germany) #303 MSC Kempenich e.V. im ADAC asBest RACING						85 (2)		73 (3)	46 (1)	
	(Germany) Timo Hochwind	(Germany) #10 Max Kruse Racing						Ret	46 (1)	33 (2)		
	(Germany) Volker Wawer	(Germany) #333 Schmickler Performance (powered by Ravenol)								29 (1)		
	(Germany) Kai Riemer	(Germany) #333 Schmickler Performance (powered by Ravenol)						34 (1)				
	(Germany) Sebastian Schemmann	(Germany) #303 MSC Kempenich e.V. im ADAC asBest RACING									46 (1)	
	(Germany) Heiko Hammel	(Germany) #10 Max Kruse Racing	87 (2)		Ret	29 (2)	30 (2)				53 (2)	
	(Germany) Rudi Speich (Germany) Roland Waschkau	(Germany) #300 MSC Sinzig e.V. im ADAC			49 (2)							
	(United States) Andrew Engelmann	(Germany) #10 Max Kruse Racing									53 (2)	
	(Germany) Lucas Waltermann (Germany) Philipp Eis	(Germany) #303 MSC Kempenich e.V. im ADAC asBest RACING						85 (2)				
	(Germany) Jörg Kittelmann (Argentina) Marcos Adolfo Vázquez	(Germany) #319 (SEAT León Cup Racer)					37 (3)					
	(Jordan) Nadir Zuhour	(Germany) #303 MSC Kempenich e.V. im ADAC asBest RACING								73 (3)		
	(Germany) Kim Berwanger (Germany) Roland Schmid	(Germany) #303 MSC Kempenich e.V. im ADAC asBest RACING					Ret					

Colour	Result
Gold	Winner
Silver	Second place
Bronze	Third place
Green	Points classification
Blue	Non-points classification
Blue	Non-classified finish (NC)
Purple	Retired, not classified (Ret)
Red	Did not qualify (DNQ)
Red	Did not pre-qualify (DNPQ)
Black	Disqualified (DSQ)
White	Did not start (DNS)
White	Withdrew (WD)
White	Race cancelled (C)
Blank	Did not practice (DNP)
Blank	Did not arrive (DNA)
Blank	Excluded (EX)

(n) - Position in class

==== SP3 ====
Pos.	Driver	Team	NLS1	NLS2	NLS3	NLS4	NLS5	NLS6	NLS7	NLS8	NLS9	Points
1	(Hungary) Adam Lengyel (Hungary) Bendeguz Molnar	(Hungary) #286 Car Competition Racing Team	63 (1)	91 (1)	90 (2)	55 (1)	DNQ	61 (1)	59 (1)			29
3	(Germany) Stephan Epp (Germany) Michael Ülwer	(Germany) #270 MSC Adenau e.V. im ADAC		Ret	83 (1)	Ret	79 (1)	Ret				11
5	(Germany) Oliver Kriese	(Germany) #281 (Dacia Logan)	90 (2)	109 (4)	Ret							6
Entries ineligible for championship
	(Germany) Timo Kaatz	(Germany) #270 MSC Adenau e.V. im ADAC		Ret	83 (1)	Ret	79 (1)	Ret				
	(Germany) Goedicke Holger (Germany) Lukas Krämer	(Germany) #282 (Renault Clio 3 RS Cup)								76 (1)		
	(Armenia) Roman Mavlanov	(Armenia) #276 (Renault Clio 3 Cup)	Ret	96 (2)	91 (3)							
	(Germany) Lorenz Stegmann	(Armenia) #276 (Renault Clio 3 Cup)		96 (2)	91 (3)							
	(Germany) Maximilian Weissermel	(Germany) #281 (Dacia Logan)	90 (2)	109 (4)								
	(Belgium) Gilles Magnus	(Armenia) #276 (Renault Clio 3 Cup)	Ret		91 (3)							
	(Japan) Masato Mitsuhashi (Japan) Rintaro Kubo	(Japan) #284 Team HAL		98 (3)		Ret						
	(Germany) Bernd Strenge	(Armenia) #276 (Renault Clio 3 Cup)			91 (3)							
	(Japan) Yoshikazu Sobu	(Japan) #284 Team HAL		98 (3)								
	(Germany) Benjamin Zerfeld (Romania) Theodor Devolescu	(Germany) #273 (Toyota GT86)			105 (4)							
	(Germany) Thomas Geilen	(Germany) #281 (Dacia Logan)		109 (4)								
	(Germany) Michael Lachmayer	(Germany) #281 (Dacia Logan)			Ret							

Colour	Result
Gold	Winner
Silver	Second place
Bronze	Third place
Green	Points classification
Blue	Non-points classification
Blue	Non-classified finish (NC)
Purple	Retired, not classified (Ret)
Red	Did not qualify (DNQ)
Red	Did not pre-qualify (DNPQ)
Black	Disqualified (DSQ)
White	Did not start (DNS)
White	Withdrew (WD)
White	Race cancelled (C)
Blank	Did not practice (DNP)
Blank	Did not arrive (DNA)
Blank	Excluded (EX)

(n) - Position in class

==== AT(-G) ====
Pos.	Driver	Team	NLS1	NLS2	NLS3	NLS4	NLS5	NLS6	NLS7	NLS8	NLS9	Points
1	(Germany) Oliver Sprungmann	(Germany) #420 Four Motors Bioconcept-Car		41 (2)	44 (1)		38 (1)	36 (2)	NC			17
2	(Germany) Georg Griesemann	(Germany) #635 Griesemann Gruppe by TR Team						62 (4)	30 (2)			8
3	(Germany) Tim Schrick (Germany) Lucian Gavris	(Germany) #636 (Subaru BRZ RR-AT)			Ret						97 (1)	3
Entries ineligible for championship
	(Denmark) Henrik Bollerslev (Germany) Thomas Kiefer (Germany) "Tom"	(Germany) #320 Four Motors Bioconcept-Car		40 (1)	Ret		80 (2)	19 (1)	24 (1)			
	(Germany) "Smudo"	(Germany) #320 Four Motors Bioconcept-Car		40 (1)	Ret			19 (1)	24 (1)			
	(Germany) Matthias Beckwermert	(Germany) #420 Four Motors Bioconcept-Car		41 (2)	44 (1)		38 (1)	36 (2)	NC			
	(Germany) Karl Pflanz	(Germany) #420 Four Motors Bioconcept-Car			44 (1)		38 (1)	36 (2)	NC			
	(Switzerland) Luca Veronelli	(Germany) #420 Four Motors Bioconcept-Car					38 (1)	36 (2)	NC			
	(Brazil) Felipe Nasr (Germany) Alesia Kreutzpointner (Germany) Jacqueline Kreutzpointner	(Germany) #420 Four Motors Bioconcept-Car								52 (1)		
	(Germany) Yves Volte	(Germany) #635 Griesemann Gruppe by TR Team						62 (4)	30 (2)			
	(Germany) Björn Griesemann	(Germany) #635 Griesemann Gruppe by TR Team							30 (2)			
	(Netherlands) Maxime Oosten	(Germany) #420 Four Motors Bioconcept-Car		41 (2)								
	(Switzerland) Marc Schöni	(Germany) #633 Four Motors Bioconcept-Car		67 (3)	DNS		Ret	46 (3)	33 (3)			
	(Switzerland) Marco Antonio Timbal	(Germany) #633 Four Motors Bioconcept-Car					Ret	46 (3)	33 (3)			
	(Germany) Henning Cramer	(Germany) #633 Four Motors Bioconcept-Car						46 (3)	33 (3)			
	(Germany) David Beckmann	(Germany) #633 Four Motors Bioconcept-Car		67 (3)								
	(Germany) David Beckmann	(Germany) #420 Four Motors Bioconcept-Car									Ret	
	(United Kingdom) "Matt"	(Germany) #633 Four Motors Bioconcept-Car		67 (3)	DNS							
	(Denmark) Bastian Buus	(Germany) #633 Four Motors Bioconcept-Car			DNS							
	(Denmark) Bastian Buus	(Germany) #420 Four Motors Bioconcept-Car									Ret	
	(Germany) Christoph Hewer (Switzerland) Ivan Reggiani	(Germany) #633 Four Motors Bioconcept-Car					Ret					

Colour	Result
Gold	Winner
Silver	Second place
Bronze	Third place
Green	Points classification
Blue	Non-points classification
Blue	Non-classified finish (NC)
Purple	Retired, not classified (Ret)
Red	Did not qualify (DNQ)
Red	Did not pre-qualify (DNPQ)
Black	Disqualified (DSQ)
White	Did not start (DNS)
White	Withdrew (WD)
White	Race cancelled (C)
Blank	Did not practice (DNP)
Blank	Did not arrive (DNA)
Blank	Excluded (EX)

(n) - Position in class

==== TCR ====
Pos.	Driver	Team	NLS1	NLS2	NLS3	NLS4	NLS5	NLS6	NLS7	NLS8	NLS9	Points
1	(Switzerland) Roger Vögeli (Germany) Mike Halder	(Germany) #807 Halder Motorsport	NC	Ret	64 (4)			NC	57 (1)	Ret		9
3	(Germany) Sebastian Schemmann	(Germany) #808 MSC Kempenich e.V. im ADAC asBest RACING					NC					8
3	(Germany) Sebastian Schemmann	(Germany) #800 MSC Emstal e.V. im ADAC						48 (1)			49 (2)	8
Entries ineligible for championship
	(Norway) Håkon Schjærin (Norway) Kenneth Østvold	(Norway) #801 Møller Bil Motorsport			43 (1)	26 (1)	35 (1)			27 (1)	37 (1)	
	(Norway) Anders Lindstad	(Norway) #801 Møller Bil Motorsport				26 (1)	35 (1)			27 (1)	37 (1)	
	(Germany) Jens Wulf	(Germany) #808 MSC Kempenich e.V. im ADAC asBest RACING	58 (1)	85 (2)		32 (3)	NC					
	(Germany) Jens Wulf	(Germany) #821 (Audi RS 3 LMS TCR)			50 (3)							
	(Germany) Meik Utsch	(Germany) #808 MSC Kempenich e.V. im ADAC asBest RACING	58 (1)	85 (2)	NC	32 (3)	NC					
	(Germany) Florian Haller	(Germany) #808 MSC Kempenich e.V. im ADAC asBest RACING					NC					
	(Germany) Florian Haller	(Germany) #800 MSC Emstal e.V. im ADAC						48 (1)			49 (2)	
	(Italy) Daniel Fink	(Germany) #800 MSC Emstal e.V. im ADAC						48 (1)			49 (2)	
	(Germany) Michelle Halder	(Germany) #807 Halder Motorsport		Ret	64 (4)			NC	57 (1)	Ret		
	(Switzerland) Roland Schmid	(Germany) #808 MSC Kempenich e.V. im ADAC asBest RACING	58 (1)		NC							
	(Norway) Atle Gulbrandsen	(Norway) #801 Møller Bil Motorsport			43 (1)							
	(Germany) Mathias Schläppi (Germany) Stephan Epp	(Germany) #833 (Audi RS 3 LMS TCR)		46 (1)								
	(Italy) Armando Stanco (Italy) Dario Stanco	(Italy) #811 (Cupra TCR)			45 (2)	27 (2)					95 (3)	
	(Germany) Marco Knappmeier (Germany) Dirk Groneck	(Germany) #820 (Volkswagen Golf VII TCR)	61 (2)	Ret								
	(Germany) Marco Knappmeier (Germany) Dirk Groneck	(Germany) #822 (Volkswagen Golf VII TCR)		105 (3)	Ret							
	(Germany) Achim Johanns	(Germany) #820 (Volkswagen Golf VII TCR)	61 (2)									
	(Germany) Achim Johanns	(Germany) #822 (Volkswagen Golf VII TCR)		105 (3)								
	(Luxembourg) Patryk Krupinski (Austria) Christian Klien	(Germany) #827 JP Motorsport (Vortex Competition)						50 (2)				
	(France) Jean-Marc Finot (France) Carlos Antunes Tavares	(France) #802 (Opel Astra)								65 (2)		
	(Germany) Philipp Eis	(Germany) #808 MSC Kempenich e.V. im ADAC asBest RACING		85 (2)								
	(Germany) Maik Knappmeier	(Germany) #822 (Volkswagen Golf VII TCR)		105 (3)	Ret							
	(Germany) Kim Berwanger	(Germany) #808 MSC Kempenich e.V. im ADAC asBest RACING				32 (3)						
	(Germany) Volker Garrn	(Germany) #821 (Audi RS 3 LMS TCR)			50 (3)							
	(France) Jean-Philippe Imparato (France) Francois Wales	(France) #802 (Opel Astra)			96 (5)							
	(Denmark) Nicolai Sylvest	(Germany) #807 Halder Motorsport	NC									
	(Germany) Andreas Tasche	(Germany) #808 MSC Kempenich e.V. im ADAC asBest RACING			NC							
	(Germany) Tim Groneck	(Germany) #820 (Volkswagen Golf VII TCR)		Ret								
	(Germany) Tobias Jung (Germany) Michael Eichhorn	(France) #802 (Opel Astra)					Ret					

Colour	Result
Gold	Winner
Silver	Second place
Bronze	Third place
Green	Points classification
Blue	Non-points classification
Blue	Non-classified finish (NC)
Purple	Retired, not classified (Ret)
Red	Did not qualify (DNQ)
Red	Did not pre-qualify (DNPQ)
Black	Disqualified (DSQ)
White	Did not start (DNS)
White	Withdrew (WD)
White	Race cancelled (C)
Blank	Did not practice (DNP)
Blank	Did not arrive (DNA)
Blank	Excluded (EX)

(n) - Position in class

==== V6 ====
Pos.	Driver	Team	NLS1	NLS2	NLS3	NLS4	NLS5	NLS6	NLS7	NLS8	NLS9	Points
1	(Germany) Lutz Rühl (Germany) Christian Büllesbach (Germany) Andreas Schettler	(Germany) #396 Adrenalin Motorsport Team Motec	47 (1)	62 (1)	55 (1)	43 (1)	44 (1)	72 (2)	37 (1)	54 (2)	42 (1)	26 (32)
4	(Germany) Christian Heuchemer	(Germany) #400 Schmickler Performance powered by Ravenol			66 (2)		62 (3)	47 (1)		50 (1)	50‡ (2)	15
5	(Germany) David Ackermann	(Germany) #410 MSC Adenau e.V. im ADAC	60 (2)	Ret		54 (2)	48 (2)			60 (3)	58 (3)	12
Entries ineligible for championship
	(Germany) Daniel Zils	(Germany) #396 Adrenalin Motorsport Team Motec	47 (1)	62 (1)	55 (1)	43 (1)	44 (1)	72 (2)	37 (1)	54 (2)	42 (1)	
	(Germany) Thomas Heuchemer	(Germany) #400 Schmickler Performance powered by Ravenol			66 (2)		62 (3)	47 (1)		50 (1)	50 (2)	
	(Germany) Carl-Leonard Glinz	(Germany) #400 Schmickler Performance powered by Ravenol						47 (1)			50 (2)	
	(Germany) Albert Egbert	(Germany) #400 Schmickler Performance powered by Ravenol					62 (3)			50 (1)		
	(Italy) Aleardo Bertelli (Italy) Stefano Croci	(Germany) #410 MSC Adenau e.V. im ADAC	60 (2)			54 (2)				60 (3)	58 (3)	
	(Italy) Graziano Grazzini	(Germany) #410 MSC Adenau e.V. im ADAC				54 (2)				60 (3)		
	(Germany) Stefan Müller (United Kingdom) Scott Marshall (Germany) Axel Jahn	(Germany) #410 MSC Adenau e.V. im ADAC					48 (2)					
	(Germany) Michael Frigge	(Germany) #400 Schmickler Performance powered by Ravenol									50 (2)	
	(Germany) Sascha Kloft	(Germany) #400 Schmickler Performance powered by Ravenol			66 (2)							
	(Germany) Alexander Köppen (Germany) Sebastian Rings	(Germany) #416 (Porsche 911)			101 (3)			Ret				
	(Mexico) Juan Carlos Carmona Chavez	(Germany) #410 MSC Adenau e.V. im ADAC									58 (3)	
	(Poland) Jacek Pydys	(Germany) #416 (Porsche 911)			101 (3)							
	(Thailand) Akkarapong Akkaneenirot (Thailand) Kris Vasuratna	(Germany) #410 MSC Adenau e.V. im ADAC		Ret								
	(Germany) Andreas Schaflitzl	(Germany) #416 (Porsche 911)						Ret				
	(Australia) Cesar Mendieta (France) Joel Le Bihan (France) Fabrice Reicher	(Germany) #418 SRS Team Sorg Rennsport			DNS							

‡: Result not counted for classification

Colour	Result
Gold	Winner
Silver	Second place
Bronze	Third place
Green	Points classification
Blue	Non-points classification
Blue	Non-classified finish (NC)
Purple	Retired, not classified (Ret)
Red	Did not qualify (DNQ)
Red	Did not pre-qualify (DNPQ)
Black	Disqualified (DSQ)
White	Did not start (DNS)
White	Withdrew (WD)
White	Race cancelled (C)
Blank	Did not practice (DNP)
Blank	Did not arrive (DNA)
Blank	Excluded (EX)

(n) - Position in class

==== V5 ====
Pos.	Driver	Team	NLS1	NLS2	NLS3	NLS4	NLS5	NLS6	NLS7	NLS8	NLS9	Points
1	(Germany) Ulrich Korn (Germany) Tobias Korn (Germany) Daniel Korn	(Germany) #444 Adrenalin Motorsport Team Motec	76 (1)	77 (2)	104 (3)	Ret	51 (1)	58 (1)	51 (1)	DNS	63 (1)	32
4	(Germany) Holger Gachot	(Germany) #445 MSC Adenau e.V. im ADAC	85 (2)	101 (4)	95 (2)	64 (1)	65 (2)					17
Entries ineligible for championship
	(United States) Michael Skeen	(Germany) #444 Adrenalin Motorsport Team Motec						58 (1)	51 (1)			
	(Germany) Jérôme Larbi	(Germany) #445 MSC Adenau e.V. im ADAC	85 (2)	101 (4)	95 (2)	64 (1)	65 (2)	78 (3)		64 (2)		
	(Germany) Axel Jahn	(Germany) #445 MSC Adenau e.V. im ADAC			95 (2)	64 (1)		78 (3)				
	(Germany) Florian Ebener	(Germany) #440 QTQ-raceperformance		76 (1)	Ret		70 (3)					
	(Denmark) Felix Hahne (Denmark) Nicolaj Kandborg	(Denmark) #456 Team Young KRS Danes		90 (3)	84 (1)							
	(Germany) Benedikt Höpfer (Poland) Jacek Pydys (Germany) Marcel Haas	(Germany) #446 (Porsche Cayman)								58 (1)	Ret	
	(United States) Danny Soufi (Belgium) Gilles Magnus	(Germany) #440 QTQ-raceperformance		76 (1)	Ret							
	(Ukraine) Ivan Peklin	(Germany) #444 Adrenalin Motorsport Team Motec					51 (1)					
	(Germany) Stefan Gaukler	(Germany) #446 (Porsche Cayman)								58 (1)		
	(Germany) Sophia Gachot	(Germany) #445 MSC Adenau e.V. im ADAC	85 (2)	101 (4)				78 (3)				
	(Germany) Philip Ade	(Germany) #445 MSC Adenau e.V. im ADAC					65 (2)	78 (3)				
	(Germany) Andreas Müller	(Germany) #450 W&S Motorsport								74 (3)	69 (2)	
	(United Kingdom) Simon Glenn (United Kingdom) Jody Halse	(United Kingdom) #448 (BMW E36 M3)					NC	70 (2)				
	(Germany) David Ackermann	(Germany) #445 MSC Adenau e.V. im ADAC								64 (2)		
	(Germany) Robert Hinzer	(Germany) #445 MSC Adenau e.V. im ADAC					65 (2)					
	(Germany) Peter Siebert	(Germany) #450 W&S Motorsport									69 (2)	
	(Romania) Theodor Devolescu (South Africa) Mikaeel Pitamber	(Germany) #440 QTQ-raceperformance					70 (3)					
	(Bulgaria) Stefan Bostandjiev	(Germany) #450 W&S Motorsport								74 (3)		
	(Germany) Christoph Ruhrmann (Germany) Gerd Grundmann (Germany) Manfred Weber	(Germany) #447 (Porsche Cayman)		102 (5)								
	(Germany) Tassilo Zumpe	(Germany) #446 (Porsche Cayman)									Ret	

Colour	Result
Gold	Winner
Silver	Second place
Bronze	Third place
Green	Points classification
Blue	Non-points classification
Blue	Non-classified finish (NC)
Purple	Retired, not classified (Ret)
Red	Did not qualify (DNQ)
Red	Did not pre-qualify (DNPQ)
Black	Disqualified (DSQ)
White	Did not start (DNS)
White	Withdrew (WD)
White	Race cancelled (C)
Blank	Did not practice (DNP)
Blank	Did not arrive (DNA)
Blank	Excluded (EX)

(n) - Position in class

==== V4 ====
Pos.	Driver	Team	NLS1	NLS2	NLS3	NLS4	NLS5	NLS6	NLS7	NLS8	NLS9	Points
1	(Finland) Juha Miettinen (Sweden) Dan Berghult	(Finland) / (Sweden) #730 (BMW 325i)	78 (1)	92 (2)	92 (1)	68 (4)	69 (3)	76 (1)	56 (2)	72 (3)	84 (6)	39 (44)
3	(Germany) Oliver Frisse (Germany) Danny Brink (Germany) Jürgen Huber	(Germany) #702 QTQ-Raceperformance	Ret	88 (1)	93 (2)	62 (1)	Ret	77 (2)	55 (1)	Ret	92 (7)	36
6	(Brazil) Flavia Pellegrino Fernandes	(Germany) #711 (BMW 325i)					68 (2)					30
6	(Brazil) Flavia Pellegrino Fernandes	(Finland) / (Sweden) #730 (BMW 325i)						76 (1)	56 (2)		84 (6)	30
6	(Brazil) Flavia Pellegrino Fernandes	(Germany) #750 (BMW 325i)								69 (2)		30
7	(Germany) Desiree Müller	(Germany) #711 (BMW 325i)	86 (2)	103 (5)	100 (3)	65 (3)	68 (2)	79 (3)	60 (3)		83 (5)	30 (32)
8	(Norway) Dr. Dr. Stein Tveten	(Germany) #733 Dr. Dr. Stein Tveten Motorsport									73 (2)	11
9	(Germany) Serge van Vooren (Germany) Jörg Schönfelder	(Germany) #750 (BMW 325i)						80 (4)				4
Entries ineligible for championship
	(Germany) Manfred Röss (Germany) Matthias Röss (Germany) Malte Tack	(Germany) #760 Manheller Racing					63 (1)			63 (1)	72 (1)	
	(Germany) Niklas Walter	(Germany) #735 MSC Kempenich e.V. im ADAC asBest Racing / Up2race				63 (2)					93 (8)	
	(Germany) Niklas Walter	(Germany) #750 (BMW 325i)								69 (2)		
	(Germany) Philipp Romboy	(Germany) #711 (BMW 325i)	86 (2)	103 (5)	100 (3)			79 (3)	60 (3)			
	(Germany) Henning Hausmeier	(Germany) #711 (BMW 325i)	86 (2)		100 (3)						83 (5)	
	(Germany) Richard Schäfer	(Germany) #735 MSC Kempenich e.V. im ADAC asBest Racing / Up2race				63 (2)					93 (8)	
	(Germany) Dennis Surace	(Germany) #735 MSC Kempenich e.V. im ADAC asBest Racing / Up2race				63 (2)						
	(Switzerland) Philipp Hagnauer (United Kingdom) Bradley Philpot	(Germany) #711 (BMW 325i)					68 (2)					
	(Germany) Arvid Thal	(Germany) #750 (BMW 325i)								69 (2)		
	(Germany) Tim Lukas Müller	(Germany) #711 (BMW 325i)						79 (3)	60 (3)		83 (5)	
	(Germany) Dominik Schöning (Germany) Roman Schiemenz	(Germany) #740 SFG Schönau e.V. im ADAC		94 (3)							77 (3)	
	(Germany) Richard Gresek	(Germany) #711 (BMW 325i)				65 (3)						
	(Sweden) Jonas Nilsson	(Finland) / (Sweden) #730 (BMW 325i)								72 (3)		
	(Germany) Reiner Thomas (Germany) Manfred Schmitz	(Germany) #729 (BMW 325i)			103 (4)		71 (4)	88 (5)	64 (4)			
	(Germany) Katja Thomas	(Germany) #729 (BMW 325i)					71 (4)	88 (5)	64 (4)			
	(Germany) Nico Hantke	(Germany) #729 (BMW 325i)			103 (4)		71 (4)					
	(United Kingdom) Benjamin Lyons (Germany) Markus Löw	(United Kingdom) / (Germany) #747 (BMW 325i)									78 (4)	
	(Slovenia) Jure Zove	(Germany) #750 (BMW 325i)						80 (4)				
	(United Kingdom) Frank Bird (Italy) Fabio Citignola (Argentina) Marcos Adolfo Vázquez	(Germany) #750 (BMW 325i)		97 (4)								
	(Germany) Fritz Hebig (Germany) Peter Elkmann	(Germany) #703 QTQ-Raceperformance									94 (9)	
	(Germany) Romano Schultz (Germany) Florian Kramer	(Germany) #731 (BMW 325i)									Ret	
	(Canada) Samantha Tan (Germany) Philip Hamprecht	(Germany) #700 RPM Racing			DNS							

Colour	Result
Gold	Winner
Silver	Second place
Bronze	Third place
Green	Points classification
Blue	Non-points classification
Blue	Non-classified finish (NC)
Purple	Retired, not classified (Ret)
Red	Did not qualify (DNQ)
Red	Did not pre-qualify (DNPQ)
Black	Disqualified (DSQ)
White	Did not start (DNS)
White	Withdrew (WD)
White	Race cancelled (C)
Blank	Did not practice (DNP)
Blank	Did not arrive (DNA)
Blank	Excluded (EX)

(n) - Position in class

==== VT3 ====
Pos.	Driver	Team	NLS1	NLS2	NLS3	NLS4	NLS5	NLS6	NLS7	NLS8	NLS9	Points
1	(Germany) Tobias Jung (Germany) Michael Eichhorn	(Germany) #464 (Cupra Leon)								75 (1)		2
Entries ineligible for championship
	(Argentina) Marcos Adolfo Vázquez	(Germany) #474 Team Mathol Racing e.V.	52 (1)	60 (1)	53 (1)	46 (1)	54 (1)	Ret				
	(Germany) Theo Oeverhaus	(Germany) #474 Team Mathol Racing e.V.	52 (1)	60 (1)	53 (1)							
	(Germany) Erik Braun (Germany) Maximilian Schmidt	(Germany) #474 Team Mathol Racing e.V.				46 (1)	54 (1)	Ret				
	(United Kingdom) Frank Bird	(Germany) #474 Team Mathol Racing e.V.		60 (1)	53 (1)							
	(Argentina) "Coco" (Germany) Alex Fielenbach	(Germany) #474 Team Mathol Racing e.V.	52 (1)									
	(Germany) Sebastian Tauber (Switzerland) Dominic Kulpowicz	(Germany) #461 (BMW M2 N55)				53 (2)					61 (1)	
	(Sweden) Eric Ullström (Switzerland) Alexander Walker	(Germany) #460 (BMW M2 N55)						DNQ				

Colour	Result
Gold	Winner
Silver	Second place
Bronze	Third place
Green	Points classification
Blue	Non-points classification
Blue	Non-classified finish (NC)
Purple	Retired, not classified (Ret)
Red	Did not qualify (DNQ)
Red	Did not pre-qualify (DNPQ)
Black	Disqualified (DSQ)
White	Did not start (DNS)
White	Withdrew (WD)
White	Race cancelled (C)
Blank	Did not practice (DNP)
Blank	Did not arrive (DNA)
Blank	Excluded (EX)

(n) - Position in class

==== VT2-FWD ====
Pos.	Driver	Team	NLS1	NLS2	NLS3	NLS4	NLS5	NLS6	NLS7	NLS8	NLS9	Points
1	(Germany) Daniel Mertens (Germany) Christian Alexander Dannesberger	(Germany) #491 Zierau Hochvolt by Mertens Motorsport	54 (1)	75 (3)	70 (2)	50 (2)	57 (3)	63 (2)	43 (1)	40 (1)	96 (8)	95 (104)
3	(Germany) Michael Bohrer	(Germany) #485 Hyundai Driving Experience	55 (2)	66 (2)	71 (3)	49 (1)	49 (1)	Ret				83
3	(Germany) Michael Bohrer	(Germany) #498 mathilda racing - Team LAVO Carwash								47 (3)	62 (2)	83
4=	(Germany) Felix Schumann (Germany) Jürgen Nett	(Germany) #489 mathilda racing - Team LAVO Carwash	Ret	65 (1)	67 (1)	51 (3)	Ret	60 (1)	47 (2)	44 (2)	DNS	82
4=	(Germany) Joachim Nett	(Germany) #489 mathilda racing - Team LAVO Carwash	Ret	65 (1)	67 (1)	51 (3)	Ret	60 (1)	47 (2)	44 (2)	DNS	82
4=	(Germany) Joachim Nett	(Germany) #498 mathilda racing - Team LAVO Carwash					67 (5)					82
4=	(Germany) Michael Paatz	(Germany) #489 mathilda racing - Team LAVO Carwash	Ret	65 (1)	67 (1)	51 (3)	Ret	60 (1)	47 (2)	44 (2)		82
8	(Germany) Gerrit Holthaus (Germany) Marcus Willhardt	(Germany) #485 Hyundai Driving Experience	55 (2)	66 (2)	71 (3)	49 (1)	49 (1)	Ret				64
10	(Germany) Timo Beuth	(Germany) #498 mathilda racing - Team LAVO Carwash	70 (3)	81 (6)	79 (5)	57 (5)	67 (5)	66 (3)	49 (3)	47 (3)	62 (2)	56 (63)
11	(Germany) Leon Dreiser	(Germany) #498 mathilda racing - Team LAVO Carwash	70 (3)	81 (6)	79 (5)		67 (5)	66 (3)	49 (3)	47 (3)	62 (2)	56 (59)
12	(Germany) Norbert Fischer	(Germany) #491 Zierau Hochvolt by Mertens Motorsport	54 (1)	75 (3)	70 (2)	50 (2)	57 (3)					55
13	(Germany) Wolfgang Haugg	(Germany) #498 mathilda racing - Team LAVO Carwash	70 (3)	81 (6)	79 (5)	57 (5)		66 (3)	49 (3)			39
14	(Germany) Tobias Overbeck	(Germany) #485 Hyundai Driving Experience	55 (2)	66 (2)	71 (3)							30
15	(Germany) Pascal Fritzsche	(United Kingdom) #499 (Hyundai i30N)	73 (4)	84 (9)		66 (6)				53 (4)	64 (3)	24
16	(Germany) Ulrich Schmidt	(Germany) #490 Giti Tire Motorsport by WS Racing	79 (7)	86 (10)	98 (11)		72 (6)	73 (5)	61 (5)	70 (6)		21
17	(Germany) Achim Feinen	(Germany) #488 SRS Team Sorg Rennsport	Ret					74 (6)	54 (4)		99 (9)	13
18	(Germany) Oliver Kriese	(Germany) #481 (Renault Mégane)				71 (8)	73 (7)	86 (8)	63 (6)	71 (7)	89 (7)	13
19	(Belgium) Jarno D'Hauw	(Germany) #466 Walkenhorst Motorsport	74 (5)	82 (7)	94 (10)							7
20	(Germany) Kurt Strube	(Germany) #488 SRS Team Sorg Rennsport			85 (7)	Ret		74 (6)		DNS	99 (9)	7
21=	(Germany) Tobias Jung	(Germany) #494 Jung Motorsport	Ret	Ret	Ret	Ret		NC	65 (7)			3
21=	(Germany) Tobias Jung	(Germany) #495 Jung Motorsport		93 (12)								3
21=	(Germany) Michael Eichhorn	(Germany) #494 Jung Motorsport	Ret	Ret	Ret			NC	65 (7)			3
23	(Brazil) Flavia Pellegrino Fernandes	(Germany) #467 MSC Kempenich e.V. im ADAC asBest Racing		100 (14)								2
23	(Brazil) Flavia Pellegrino Fernandes	(Germany) #466 Walkenhorst Motorsport			94 (10)	Ret						2
Entries ineligible for championship
	(Venezuela) Manuel Maldonado	(Germany) #466 Walkenhorst Motorsport					55 (2)	Ret	Ret			
	(Venezuela) Manuel Maldonado	(Germany) #470 Walkenhorst Motorsport									60 (1)	
	(United States) Jeff Ricca	(Germany) #491 Zierau Hochvolt by Mertens Motorsport						63 (2)	43 (1)			
	(United Kingdom) Bailey Voisin	(Germany) #470 Walkenhorst Motorsport		79 (5)		56 (4)					60 (1)	
	(United Kingdom) Jack Aitken	(Germany) #470 Walkenhorst Motorsport									60 (1)	
	(United States) Dev Gore	(Germany) #466 Walkenhorst Motorsport					55 (2)	Ret	Ret			
	(United States) Dev Gore	(Germany) #470 Walkenhorst Motorsport								66 (5)		
	(France) Lucas Frayssinet	(Germany) #466 Walkenhorst Motorsport					55 (2)	Ret	Ret			
	(Germany) Jan Marschalkowski	(Germany) #498 mathilda racing - Team LAVO Carwash				57 (5)			49 (3)			
	(Germany) "Tyson"	(Germany) #498 mathilda racing - Team LAVO Carwash						66 (3)				
	(Germany) "Tyson"	(Germany) #479 mathilda racing - Team LAVO Carwash							Ret			
	(Germany) Tobi Neuber (Germany) Thomas Schönfeld	(United Kingdom) #499 (Hyundai i30N)									64 (3)	
	(United Kingdom) Alex Wright	(United Kingdom) #499 (Hyundai i30N)	73 (4)	84 (9)	82 (6)	66 (6)				53 (4)		
	(United States) Mason Filippi	(Germany) #487 Hyundai Driving Experience	77 (6)	87 (11)	77 (4)							
	(United States) Mason Filippi	(Germany) #486 Hyundai Driving Experience						69 (4)				
	(United States) Michael Lewis	(Germany) #486 Hyundai Driving Experience	83 (8)	78 (4)								
	(United States) Michael Lewis	(Germany) #487 Hyundai Driving Experience			77 (4)							
	(United States) Tazio Ottis	(Germany) #466 Walkenhorst Motorsport		82 (7)								
	(United States) Tazio Ottis	(Germany) #470 Walkenhorst Motorsport					61 (4)			66 (5)		
	(United Kingdom) Alex Connor	(Germany) #470 Walkenhorst Motorsport		79 (5)		56 (4)						
	(Austria) Bernhard Wagner	(Germany) #488 SRS Team Sorg Rennsport		83 (8)	85 (7)	Ret		74 (6)	54 (4)	DNS		
	(Germany) Olaf Hoppelshäuser	(United Kingdom) #499 (Hyundai i30N)	73 (4)	84 (9)	82 (6)							
	(United States) Harry Gottsacker	(Germany) #487 Hyundai Driving Experience	77 (6)	87 (11)	77 (4)							
	(United States) Simon Tibbet	(Germany) #488 SRS Team Sorg Rennsport						74 (6)	54 (4)			
	(United Kingdom) James Kell	(Germany) #466 Walkenhorst Motorsport		82 (7)	94 (10)							
	(United Kingdom) James Kell	(Germany) #470 Walkenhorst Motorsport					61 (4)					
	(Germany) Bennet Ehrl	(Germany) #466 Walkenhorst Motorsport				Ret						
	(Germany) Bennet Ehrl	(Germany) #470 Walkenhorst Motorsport					61 (4)	81 (7)	NC			
	(South Korea) Park June-sung	(Germany) #486 Hyundai Driving Experience	83 (8)	78 (4)	86 (8)							
	(Germany) Kevin Olaf Rost (Germany) Olaf Rost	(Germany) #475 Scuderia Solagon e.V.			88 (9)						80 (4)	
	(United States) Mark Wilkins	(Germany) #486 Hyundai Driving Experience						69 (4)				
	(Germany) Hans-Joachim Rabe	(Germany) #475 Scuderia Solagon e.V.									80 (4)	
	(Monaco) Micah Stanley	(Germany) #466 Walkenhorst Motorsport	74 (5)									
	(Monaco) Micah Stanley	(Germany) #470 Walkenhorst Motorsport		79 (5)								
	(China) Samuel Hsieh (China) Ma Qing Hua	(Germany) #490 Giti Tire Motorsport by WS Racing						73 (5)	61 (5)			
	(South Korea) Lim Min-jin	(Germany) #498 mathilda racing - Team LAVO Carwash					67 (5)					
	(South Korea) Lim Min-jin	(Germany) #470 Walkenhorst Motorsport						81 (7)	NC			
	(Germany) Nico Hantke	(Germany) #470 Walkenhorst Motorsport								66 (5)		
	(United Kingdom) Ben Barnicoat	(Germany) #470 Walkenhorst Motorsport		79 (5)								
	(China) Cao Hongwei (China) Zhendong Zhang	(Germany) #486 Hyundai Driving Experience									81 (5)	
	(Germany) Andreas Simon	(Germany) #490 Giti Tire Motorsport by WS Racing					72 (6)			70 (6)		
	(Germany) Gregor Starck	(Germany) #481 (Renault Mégane)						86 (8)	63 (6)	71 (7)	89 (7)	
	(Germany) Etienne Ploenes (Germany) Georg Kiefer	(Germany) #467 MSC Kempenich e.V. im ADAC asBest Racing					78 (8)				86 (6)	
	(Austria) Max Malinowski	(Germany) #490 Giti Tire Motorsport by WS Racing		86 (10)			72 (6)					
	(Argentina) Marcos Adolfo Vázquez	(United Kingdom) #499 (Hyundai i30N)			82 (6)							
	(Latvia) Patricija Stalidzane	(Germany) #490 Giti Tire Motorsport by WS Racing					72 (6)					
	(Sweden) Andreas Andersson	(Germany) #488 SRS Team Sorg Rennsport	Ret	83 (8)	85 (7)	Ret						
	(Germany) Richard Bäther	(Germany) #467 MSC Kempenich e.V. im ADAC asBest Racing				70 (7)	78 (8)					
	(United Kingdom) Harley Haughton	(Germany) #490 Giti Tire Motorsport by WS Racing	79 (7)	86 (10)	98 (11)							
	(Germany) Robert Neumann	(Germany) #467 MSC Kempenich e.V. im ADAC asBest Racing	89 (10)			70 (7)						
	(Germany) Robert Neumann	(Germany) #477 (Volkswagen Scirocco)								Ret		
	(Germany) Andre Kern	(Germany) #495 Jung Motorsport		93 (12)								
	(Germany) Andre Kern	(Germany) #494 Jung Motorsport						NC	65 (7)			
	(Germany) Fabian Tillman	(Germany) #481 (Renault Mégane)								71 (7)		
	(Germany) Stefan Trost (Germany) Carsten Sieg	(Germany) #481 (Renault Mégane)					73 (7)					
	(Germany) Axel Jahn	(Germany) #490 Giti Tire Motorsport by WS Racing	79 (7)									
	(Germany) Alexander Becker	(Germany) #481 (Renault Mégane)									89 (7)	
	(United States) Taylor Hagler	(Germany) #486 Hyundai Driving Experience	83 (8)		86 (8)							
	(United States) Taylor Hagler	(Germany) #487 Hyundai Driving Experience		87 (11)								
	(Germany) Maximilian Weissermel	(Germany) #467 MSC Kempenich e.V. im ADAC asBest Racing	89 (10)									
	(Germany) Maximilian Weissermel	(Germany) #481 (Renault Mégane)				71 (8)						
	(Germany) Christian Leukers	(Germany) #488 SRS Team Sorg Rennsport		83 (8)								
	(United Kingdom) Charles Cooper (Germany) Sebastian Sauerbrei	(Germany) #468 Bulldog Racing	88 (9)	95 (13)								
	(Germany) Mathias Baar	(Germany) #488 SRS Team Sorg Rennsport								DNS	99 (9)	
	(Germany) Dennis Leißing	(Germany) #467 MSC Kempenich e.V. im ADAC asBest Racing	89 (10)									
	(Germany) Thomas Ehrhardt (Germany) Niklas Ehrhardt	(Germany) #477 (Volkswagen Scirocco)	91 (11)		Ret	DNQ	NC					
	(Germany) Philipp Eis	(Germany) #477 (Volkswagen Scirocco)	91 (11)		Ret							
	(Germany) Robert Hinzer	(Germany) #490 Giti Tire Motorsport by WS Racing			98 (11)							
	(Germany) Lars Füting	(Germany) #495 Jung Motorsport		93 (12)								
	(Germany) Lars Füting	(Germany) #494 Jung Motorsport					Ret					
	(Germany) Tim Robertz	(Germany) #495 Jung Motorsport		93 (12)								
	(Germany) Carlo Scholl (Germany) Martin Heidrich	(Germany) #467 MSC Kempenich e.V. im ADAC asBest Racing		100 (14)								
	(Thailand) Akkarapong Akkaneenirot (Thailand) Kris Vasuratna	(Germany) #484 MSC Adenau e.V. im ADAC	Ret	104 (15)								
	(Germany) Christian Koger	(Germany) #477 (Volkswagen Scirocco)					NC	Ret				
	(Germany) Andreas Winterwerber	(Germany) #494 Jung Motorsport	Ret	Ret	Ret	Ret						
	(Germany) Maximilian Eisberg (Germany) Jonas Spölgen	(Germany) #472 (Opel Astra)					Ret	Ret				
	(Germany) Claus Dupré (Germany) Christoph Dupré (Germany) Rene Steiger	(Germany) #479 mathilda racing - Team LAVO Carwash							Ret	Ret		
	(United Kingdom) Frank Bird	(Germany) #488 SRS Team Sorg Rennsport	Ret									
	(Germany) Daniel Jenichen (Germany) Jean-Christophe David	(Germany) #494 Jung Motorsport					Ret					
	(Germany) Joachim Rabe (Switzerland) Kevin Gschwind (Switzerland) Peter Baumann	(Germany) #477 (Volkswagen Scirocco)						Ret				
	(Germany) Maik Knappmeier (Germany) Roman Schiemenz	(Germany) #477 (Volkswagen Scirocco)								Ret		

‡: Result not counted for classification

Colour	Result
Gold	Winner
Silver	Second place
Bronze	Third place
Green	Points classification
Blue	Non-points classification
Blue	Non-classified finish (NC)
Purple	Retired, not classified (Ret)
Red	Did not qualify (DNQ)
Red	Did not pre-qualify (DNPQ)
Black	Disqualified (DSQ)
White	Did not start (DNS)
White	Withdrew (WD)
White	Race cancelled (C)
Blank	Did not practice (DNP)
Blank	Did not arrive (DNA)
Blank	Excluded (EX)

(n) - Position in class

==== VT2-R+4WD ====
Pos.	Driver	Team	NLS1	NLS2	NLS3	NLS4	NLS5	NLS6	NLS7	NLS8	NLS9	Points
1	(Germany) Philipp Leisen (Norway) Oskar Sandberg (Germany) Daniel Zils	(Germany) #1 Adrenalin Motorsport Team Motec	49 (1)	53 (1)	58 (1)	41 (1)	41 (1)	41 (1)	39 (1)	37 (1)	47 (1)	117 (147)
4	(Germany) Björn Simon	(Germany) #504 SRS Team Sorg Rennsport	68 (5)	61 (3)	63 (2)	Ret	50 (2)	54 (5)	41 (2)	46 (4)	66 (6)	62 (65)
5	(Italy) Eduardo Bugane	(Germany) #504 SRS Team Sorg Rennsport		61 (3)	63 (2)	Ret	50 (2)	54 (5)	41 (2)	46 (4)	66 (6)	61
6=	(Norway) Sindre Setsås	(Germany) #511 FK Performance Motorsport	50 (2)	55 (2)	Ret	42 (2)	Ret	42 (2)	Ret		54‡ (3)	47
6=	(Switzerland) Ranko Mijatović	(Germany) #511 FK Performance Motorsport	50 (2)	55 (2)	Ret	42 (2)	Ret	42 (2)	Ret			47
8	(Israel) Moran Gott	(Germany) #504 SRS Team Sorg Rennsport	68 (5)	61 (3)	63 (2)	Ret						45
8	(Israel) Moran Gott	(Germany) #524 SRS Team Sorg Rennsport								38 (2)		45
8	(Israel) Moran Gott	(Germany) #505 QTQ-Raceperformance									48 (2)	45
9	(Germany) Hans Joachim Theiß	(Germany) #514 SRS Team Sorg Rennsport	62 (4)	73 (5)	76 (4)	69 (7)	52 (3)	75 (8)	44 (3)	61 (6)	65 (5)	43 (46)
10	(Germany) Michael Schrey	(Germany) #511 FK Performance Motorsport	50 (2)	55‡ (2)	Ret	42 (2)	Ret	42 (2)	Ret		54‡ (3)	36
11	(Germany) Maximilian Kurz	(Germany) #505 QTQ-Raceperformance	57 (3)	72 (4)	Ret	Ret	64 (7)	53 (4)	Ret		48 (2)	36
12	(Germany) Riccardo Petrolo	(Germany) #505 QTQ-Raceperformance	57 (3)	72 (4)	Ret	Ret	64 (7)	53 (4)	Ret			25
13	(Germany) Matthias Möller	(Germany) #500 Giti Tire Motorsport by WS Racing	80 (8)	106 (7)				Ret	DNS	68 (8)		4
Entries ineligible for championship
	(Sweden) Andreas Andersson	(Germany) #504 SRS Team Sorg Rennsport					50 (2)	54 (5)	41 (2)	46 (4)	66 (6)	
	(Germany) Christian Knötschke	(Germany) #504 SRS Team Sorg Rennsport						54 (5)	41 (2)			
	(Germany) Dmytro Ryzhak	(Germany) #504 SRS Team Sorg Rennsport					50 (2)					
	(Netherlands) Piet-Jan Ooms	(Germany) #514 SRS Team Sorg Rennsport	62 (4)	73 (5)	76 (4)	69 (7)	52 (3)	75 (8)	44 (3)	61 (6)	65 (5)	
	(Germany) Richard Jodexnis	(Germany) #520 Toyo Tires with Ring Racing	84 (9)	99 (6)	Ret							
	(Germany) Richard Jodexnis	(Germany) #514 SRS Team Sorg Rennsport				69 (7)	52 (3)	75 (8)	44 (3)	61 (6)	65 (5)	
	(Germany) Klaus Faßbender	(Germany) #501 Adrenalin Motorsport Team Motec	69 (6)		75 (3)	58 (3)	58 (6)	68 (7)	50 (6)	Ret	79 (11)	
	(Germany) Luka Wlömer	(Germany) #514 SRS Team Sorg Rennsport					52 (3)	75 (8)	44 (3)			
	(Germany) Marcel Manheller	(Germany) #516 Manheller Racing				60 (4)		52 (3)				
	(Germany) Marcel Manheller	(Germany) #508 MSC Adenau e.V. im ADAC					53 (4)				70 (8)	
	(Germany) Maximilian von Görtz (Germany) Harald Barth	(Germany) #516 Manheller Racing				60 (4)		52 (3)		56 (5)	67 (7)	
	(United Kingdom) Jimmy Broadbent (United Kingdom) Steve Alvarez Brown (Netherlands) Mikhail Charoudin	(Germany) #503 Black Falcon Team Bilstein						Ret	48 (5)	45 (3)	57 (4)	
	(United Kingdom) Toby Goodman (United Kingdom) Will Hunt	(Germany) #501 Adrenalin Motorsport Team Motec				58 (3)	58 (6)		50 (6)			
	(Germany) Peter Elkmann	(Germany) #501 Adrenalin Motorsport Team Motec	69 (6)	Ret	75 (3)							
	(Switzerland) Michelangelo Comazzi	(Germany) #501 Adrenalin Motorsport Team Motec	69 (6)		75 (3)							
	(United States) Danny Souki	(Germany) #505 QTQ-Raceperformance	57 (3)									
	(Germany) Marco Zabel	(Germany) #516 Manheller Racing						52 (3)				
	(Czech Republic) Michal Makeš	(Germany) #511 FK Performance Motorsport									54 (3)	
	(Denmark) Mads Gravsen	(Germany) #514 SRS Team Sorg Rennsport	62 (4)	73 (5)	76 (4)							
	(Germany) Stefan Ertl (Germany) Lukas Ertl (Germany) Matthias Benndorf	(Germany) #524 SRS Team Sorg Rennsport					56 (5)	67 (6)	45 (4)			
	(Germany) Beat Schmitz Sr. (Germany) Andre Sommerberg	(Germany) #508 MSC Adenau e.V. im ADAC				61 (5)	53 (4)	DNS		67 (7)	70 (8)	
	(Germany) Maximilian Ertl	(Germany) #524 SRS Team Sorg Rennsport						67 (6)	45 (4)			
	(Germany) Florian Ebener	(Germany) #505 QTQ-Raceperformance		72 (4)	Ret							
	(Germany) Theodore Devolescu	(Germany) #505 QTQ-Raceperformance						53 (4)	Ret			
	(Germany) Kevin Wolters	(Germany) #508 MSC Adenau e.V. im ADAC					53 (4)	DNS				
	(Germany) Lukas Drost	(Germany) #500 Giti Tire Motorsport by WS Racing		106 (7)							75 (9)	
	(Germany) Lukas Drost	(Germany) #502 Giti Tire Motorsport by WS Racing			97 (5)							
	(Japan) Yutaka Seki	(Germany) #516 Manheller Racing								56 (5)	67 (7)	
	(Hong Kong) Samuel Hsieh (China) Ma Qinghua	(Germany) #502 Giti Tire Motorsport by WS Racing		108 (8)	97 (5)		NC					
	(Germany) Anton Bauer	(Germany) #504 SRS Team Sorg Rennsport	68 (5)									
	(Germany) Sophia Menzenbach	(Germany) #520 Toyo Tires with Ring Racing	84 (9)	99 (6)	Ret	67 (6)	77 (8)		DNS			
	(India) Akshay Gupta	(Germany) #501 Adrenalin Motorsport Team Motec						68 (7)	50 (6)			
	(Germany) Klaus Völker	(Germany) #520 Toyo Tires with Ring Racing				67 (6)	77 (8)		DNS			
	(Germany) Klaus Völker	(Germany) #519 Toyo Tires with Ring Racing								Ret		
	(Germany) Rene Rudelt	(Germany) #520 Toyo Tires with Ring Racing				67 (6)			DNS			
	(Germany) Rene Rudelt	(Germany) #519 Toyo Tires with Ring Racing								Ret		
	(United Kingdom) James Lay	(Germany) #501 Adrenalin Motorsport Team Motec					58 (6)					
	(Germany) Fabian Pirrone	(Germany) #500 Giti Tire Motorsport by WS Racing	80 (8)	106 (7)				Ret	DNS	68 (8)		
	(United States) Nico Silva	(Germany) #510 MSG Bayerischer Wald Hutthurm e.V. im ADAC	72 (7)								Ret	
	(Germany) Sascha Korte	(Germany) #508 MSC Adenau e.V. im ADAC						DNS		67 (7)		
	(Germany) Christian Schotte (United States) Rob Walker	(Germany) #510 MSG Bayerischer Wald Hutthurm e.V. im ADAC	72 (7)									
	(Argentina) Eduardo Adrian Romanelli	(Germany) #505 QTQ-Raceperformance					64 (7)					
	(Austria) Markus Flasch (Germany) Jacob Erlbacher	(Germany) #501 Adrenalin Motorsport Team Motec						68 (7)				
	(Germany) Robert Hinzer	(Germany) #500 Giti Tire Motorsport by WS Racing	80 (8)					Ret	DNS	68 (8)		
	(Germany) Uwe Kleen	(Germany) #520 Toyo Tires with Ring Racing	84 (9)				77 (8)					
	(Germany) Uwe Kleen	(Germany) #519 Toyo Tires with Ring Racing								Ret		
	(China) Kristie Zhu (China) Anning Sun	(Germany) #502 Giti Tire Motorsport by WS Racing		108 (8)								
	(Japan) Masaaki Hatano	(Japan) #519 Team HAL						Ret				
	(Japan) Masaaki Hatano	(Japan) #515 Team HAL									76 (10)	
	(Japan) Rintaro Kubo	(Japan) #515 Team HAL									76 (10)	
	(United States) Zack Moore (United States) William Wachs	(Germany) #501 Adrenalin Motorsport Team Motec									79 (11)	
	(Italy) Ugo Vicenzi (Austria) Bernhard Wagner	(Germany) #524 SRS Team Sorg Rennsport									88 (12)	
	(Germany) Alexis Graf von Wedel (Germany) Lando Graf von Wedel	(Germany) #501 Adrenalin Motorsport Team Motec		Ret								
	(Belgium) Gilles Magnus (Belgium) Nicolas Baert (Armenia) Roman Mavlanov	(Belgium) #515 (BMW 125i)		Ret								
	(Germany) Christian Leukers (Sweden) Hans Lindbohm (Monaco) Micah Stanley	(Germany) #524 SRS Team Sorg Rennsport			Ret							
	(Japan) Tohjiro Azuma (Japan) Kouji Obara	(Japan) #519 Team HAL						Ret				
	(France) Laurent Laparra (France) Grégoire Boutonnet	(Germany) #501 Adrenalin Motorsport Team Motec								Ret		
	(United States) Thomas Pendergrass (Germany) Jens Kreutz	(Germany) #510 MSG Bayerischer Wald Hutthurm e.V. im ADAC									Ret	
	(France) Joel Le Bihan (France) Fabrice Reicher	(Germany) #524 SRS Team Sorg Rennsport		DNQ								

‡: Result not counted for classification

Colour	Result
Gold	Winner
Silver	Second place
Bronze	Third place
Green	Points classification
Blue	Non-points classification
Blue	Non-classified finish (NC)
Purple	Retired, not classified (Ret)
Red	Did not qualify (DNQ)
Red	Did not pre-qualify (DNPQ)
Black	Disqualified (DSQ)
White	Did not start (DNS)
White	Withdrew (WD)
White	Race cancelled (C)
Blank	Did not practice (DNP)
Blank	Did not arrive (DNA)
Blank	Excluded (EX)

Pos (n) - Position in class

==== NLS CUP2 ====
Pos.	Driver	Team	NLS1	NLS2	NLS3	NLS4	NLS5	NLS6	NLS7	NLS8	NLS9	Points
1	(Germany) Nicholas Otto	(Germany) #100 Max Kruse Racing	18 (3)	21 (3)	17 (3)	6 (2)	5 (1)	8 (1)	5 (1)	DSQ	15 (5)	92 (96)
2	(Germany) Benjamin Leuchter	(Germany) #100 Max Kruse Racing	18 (3)	21 (3)	17 (3)	6 (2)	5 (1)	8 (1)	5 (1)	DSQ		92
3	(Germany) Christopher Brück (Germany) Moritz Kranz	(Germany) #121 KKrämer Racing	Ret	18 (1)	15 (1)	7 (3)	9 (4)	9 (2)	6 (2)	6 (1)	12 (3)	89 (97)
5	(Germany) Ben Bünnagel (Germany) Noah Nagelsdiek	(Germany) #102 Black Falcon Team Identica	Ret	19 (2)	18 (4)	10 (5)	7 (2)	11 (3)	7 (3)	8 (3)	10 (1)	74 (78)
7	(Italy) Michele di Martino	(Belgium) #124 Mühlner Motorsport	66 (9)	23 (4)	20 (6)							61 (62)
7	(Italy) Michele di Martino	(Germany) #121 KKrämer Racing				7 (3)	9 (4)	9 (2)	6 (2)		12 (3)	61 (62)
7	(Italy) Michele di Martino	(Germany) #112 KKrämer Racing								Ret		61 (62)
8	(Germany) Paul Harkema (Germany) Tim Scheerbarth	(Germany) #120 AVIA W&S Motorsport	16 (1)	Ret	16 (2)	15 (8)	Ret			7 (2)	13 (4)	44
10	(Germany) Peter Terting	(Belgium) #123 Mühlner Motorsport	17 (2)	DSQ	78 (13)	Ret	10 (5)		11 (5)	11 (6)	20 (9)	34
10	(Germany) Peter Terting	(Belgium) #124 Mühlner Motorsport						14 (4)				34
11	(Germany) Nick Salewsky (Germany) Tobias Vázquez-Garcia	(Belgium) #124 Mühlner Motorsport	66 (9)	23 (4)	20 (6)	13 (7)	14 (8)	14 (4)		10 (5)	Ret	29 (30)
11	(Germany) Nick Salewsky (Germany) Tobias Vázquez-Garcia	(Belgium) #123 Mühlner Motorsport							11 (5)			29 (30)
13	(Luxembourg) Carlos Rivas	(Germany) #102 Black Falcon Team Identica	Ret	19 (2)	18 (4)							18
13	(Luxembourg) Carlos Rivas	(Germany) #125 Huber Motorsport					25 (13)					18
14	(Germany) Dominik Fugel (Germany) Fidel Leib Jun.	(Germany) #105 ADAC Sachsen e.V. / Fugel Sport	40 (8)	24 (5)	24 (8)	Ret	16 (10)	15 (5)	15 (9)	14 (9)	DNS	14
16	(Germany) Karsten Krämer	(Germany) #112 KKrämer Racing	22 (5)	30 (7)	25 (9)			18 (8)	14 (8)		18 (7)	7
16	(Germany) Karsten Krämer	(Germany) #121 KKrämer Racing	Ret									7
17	(Germany) Robin Chrzanowski (Germany) Kersten Jodexnis	(Germany) #119 Clickversicherung Team	Ret	37 (8)	60 (12)			22 (9)	16 (10)	16 (10)	19 (8)	6
19=	(United Kingdom) Jim Cameron	(Germany) #113 Team Bill Cameron		54 (9)	36 (10)	Ret	23 (12)	31 (11)	19 (11)			5
19=	(Germany) Bill Cameron	(Germany) #113 Team Bill Cameron		54 (9)	36 (10)		23 (12)	31 (11)	19 (11)			5
21	(Netherlands) Marco van Ramshorst	(Germany) #106 PB-Performance			46 (11)		17 (11)	24 (10)	Ret	28 (11)	25 (10)	5
22	(Germany) Hans Wehrmann	(Germany) #125 Huber Motorsport	26 (8)				25 (13)			15 (10)	24 (10)	4
23	(Germany) Dennis Fetzer (Belgium) Aris Balanian	(Germany) #125 Huber Motorsport									24 (10)	1
Entries ineligible for championship
	(Germany) Tobias Müller	(Germany) #112 KKrämer Racing				17 (9)		18 (8)	14 (8)	Ret		
	(Germany) Tobias Müller	(Germany) #121 KKrämer Racing					9 (4)	9 (2)	6 (2)	6 (1)	12 (3)	
	(Germany) Arne Hoffmeister	(Germany) #107 Team Mathol Racing e.V.	19 (4)	Ret	19 (5)	5 (1)	8 (3)	16 (6)	8 (4)	9 (4)	11 (2)	
	(Germany) Hendrik Still	(Germany) #107 Team Mathol Racing e.V.	19 (4)			5 (1)	8 (3)			9 (4)	11 (2)	
	(Italy) Gabriele Piana	(Germany) #103 Black Falcon Team Textar				9 (4)	11 (6)	55 (12)		12 (7)	16 (6)	
	(Italy) Gabriele Piana	(Germany) #102 Black Falcon Team Identica									10 (1)	
	(Germany) Hendrik von Danwitz	(Germany) #111 Frikadelli Racing Team	25 (7)									
	(Germany) Hendrik von Danwitz	(Germany) #102 Black Falcon Team Identica					7 (2)	11 (3)	7 (3)			
	(Germany) Marcel Hoppe	(Belgium) #123 Mühlner Motorsport	17 (2)	DSQ	78 (13)	Ret	10 (5)		11 (5)	11 (6)	20 (9)	
	(Germany) Marcel Hoppe	(Belgium) #124 Mühlner Motorsport						14 (4)				
	(Germany) David Jahn	(Germany) #120 AVIA W&S Motorsport		Ret	16 (2)	15 (8)	Ret					
	(Germany) David Jahn	(Germany) #100 Max Kruse Racing									15 (5)	
	(Austria) Reinhard Kofler	(Germany) #107 Team Mathol Racing e.V.	19 (4)	Ret	19 (5)		8 (3)	16 (6)	8 (4)	9 (4)		
	(Turkey) Mustafa Mehmet Kaya (Germany) Mike Stursberg	(Germany) #103 Black Falcon Team Textar				9 (4)	11 (6)	55 (12)	12 (6)	12 (7)	16 (6)	
	(France) Dorian Boccolacci	(Germany) #107 Team Mathol Racing e.V.	19 (4)	Ret								
	Aleksey Veremenko	(Germany) #112 KKrämer Racing	22 (5)	30 (7)	25 (9)	17 (9)	15 (9)	18 (8)	14 (8)	Ret	18 (7)	
	(Germany) Herbert Lösch	(Germany) #112 KKrämer Racing	22 (5)	30 (7)	25 (9)	17 (9)	15 (9)					
	(Germany) Moritz Östreich	(Germany) #105 ADAC Sachsen e.V. / Fugel Sport		24 (5)	24 (8)	Ret						
	(Germany) Marcel Fugel	(Germany) #105 ADAC Sachsen e.V. / Fugel Sport					16 (10)	15 (5)	15 (9)	14 (9)	DNS	
	(Netherlands) Jos Menten	(Belgium) #123 Mühlner Motorsport					10 (5)				20 (9)	
	(United Kingdom) "Jules" (Germany) Klaus Abbelen	(Germany) #111 Frikadelli Racing Team	25 (7)	28 (6)	21 (7)	12 (6)	13 (7)	17 (7)	13 (7)			
	(Germany) Felipe Fernández Laser	(Germany) #111 Frikadelli Racing Team		28 (6)		12 (6)	13 (7)	17 (7)	13 (7)			
	(Germany) Felipe Fernández Laser	(Germany) #125 Huber Motorsport								15 (10)		
	(Germany) Christopher Mies	(Germany) #103 Black Falcon Team Textar						55 (12)	12 (6)			
	(United States) Andrew Engelmann	(Germany) #127 Max Kruse Racing	23 (6)					57 (13)	Ret			
	(United States) Peter Ludwig	(Belgium) #123 Mühlner Motorsport								11 (6)		
	(Germany) Heiko Hammel	(Germany) #127 Max Kruse Racing	23 (6)									
	(Kyrgyzstan) "SELV"	(Germany) #112 KKrämer Racing					15 (9)	18 (8)	14 (8)		18 (7)	
	(Germany) Alexander Akimenkov	(Germany) #112 KKrämer Racing					15 (9)				18 (7)	
	(Germany) Leon Köhler	(Germany) #111 Frikadelli Racing Team			21 (7)							
	(New Zealand) Peter Scharmach	(Germany) #119 Clickversicherung Team			60 (12)			22 (9)	16 (10)	16 (10)	19 (8)	
	(Belgium) Simon Balcaen (Germany) Jörg Viebahn	(Germany) #104 PROsport-Racing				18 (10)	Ret			13 (8)		
	(Luxembourg) Dylan Pereira	(Germany) #119 Clickversicherung Team	Ret	37 (8)								
	(Germany) Thorsten Jung	(Belgium) #124 Mühlner Motorsport					14 (8)					
	(Germany) Thomas Kiefer	(Germany) #125 Huber Motorsport	26 (8)									
	(Germany) Ralf-Peter Bonk	(Germany) #106 PB-Performance			46 (11)		17 (11)	24 (10)	Ret	28 (11)	25 (10)	
	(United States) Tracy Krohn (Sweden) Niclas Jönsson	(Germany) #101 RPM Racing			31 (10)						Ret	
	(Netherlands) Jan Jaap van Roon (Netherlands) Tom Coronel	(Germany) #127 Max Kruse Racing						57 (13)	Ret			
	(Austria) Marco Holzer (New Zealand) Jaxon Evans	(Germany) #129 (Holzer & Evans)			Ret							
	(Germany) Lukas Ertl	(Belgium) #124 Mühlner Motorsport									Ret	

Colour	Result
Gold	Winner
Silver	Second place
Bronze	Third place
Green	Points classification
Blue	Non-points classification
Blue	Non-classified finish (NC)
Purple	Retired, not classified (Ret)
Red	Did not qualify (DNQ)
Red	Did not pre-qualify (DNPQ)
Black	Disqualified (DSQ)
White	Did not start (DNS)
White	Withdrew (WD)
White	Race cancelled (C)
Blank	Did not practice (DNP)
Blank	Did not arrive (DNA)
Blank	Excluded (EX)

(n) - Position in class

==== Porsche Endurance Trophy Nürburgring CUP2 ====
Pos.	Driver	Team	NLS1	NLS2	NLS3	NLS4	NLS5	NLS6	NLS7	NLS8	NLS9	Points
1	(Germany) Christopher Brück (Germany) Moritz Kranz	(Germany) #121 KKrämer Racing	Ret	18 (1)	15 (1)	7 (3)	9 (4)	9 (2)	6 (2)	**6 (1)**	**12 (3)**	151.5 (166.5)
2	(Germany) Nicholas Otto	(Germany) #100 Max Kruse Racing	18 (3)	21 (3)	17 (3)	6 (2)	5 (1)	8 (1)	5 (1)	DSQ	15 (5)	137 (163)
3	(Germany) Benjamin Leuchter	(Germany) #100 Max Kruse Racing	18 (3)	21 (3)	17 (3)	6 (2)	5 (1)	8 (1)	5 (1)	DSQ		137 (152)
4	(Germany) Ben Bünnagel (Germany) Noah Nagelsdiek	(Germany) #102 Black Falcon Team Identica	Ret	19 (2)	18 (4)	10 (5)	7 (2)	11 (3)	7 (3)	8 (3)	10 (1)	135.5 (146.5)
5	(Italy) Michele di Martino	(Belgium) #124 Mühlner Motorsport	66 (9)	23 (4)	20 (6)							127.5 (134.5)
5	(Italy) Michele di Martino	(Germany) #121 KKrämer Racing				7 (3)	9 (4)	9 (2)	6 (2)		**12 (3)**	127.5 (134.5)
5	(Italy) Michele di Martino	(Germany) #112 KKrämer Racing								Ret		127.5 (134.5)
6	(Germany) Arne Hoffmeister	(Germany) #107 Team Mathol Racing e.V.	19 (4)	**Ret**	19 (5)	5 (1)	8 (3)	**16 (6)**	8 (4)	9 (4)	11 (2)	121 (133)
7	(Austria) Reinhard Kofler	(Germany) #107 Team Mathol Racing e.V.	19 (4)	**Ret**	19 (5)		8 (3)	**16 (6)**	8 (4)	9 (4)		96
8	(Germany) Tobias Vázquez-Garcia (Germany) Nick Salewsky	(Belgium) #124 Mühlner Motorsport	66 (9)	23 (4)	20 (6)	13 (7)	14 (8)	14 (4)		10 (5)	Ret	92 (99)
8	(Germany) Tobias Vázquez-Garcia (Germany) Nick Salewsky	(Belgium) #123 Mühlner Motorsport							**11 (5)**			92 (99)
9	(Germany) Tobias Müller	(Germany) #112 KKrämer Racing				17 (9)		18 (8)	14 (8)	Ret		91.5
9	(Germany) Tobias Müller	(Germany) #121 KKrämer Racing					9 (4)	9 (2)	6 (2)	**6 (1)**	**12 (3)**	91.5
10	(Germany) Marcel Hoppe (Germany) Peter Terting	(Belgium) #123 Mühlner Motorsport	17 (2)	DSQ	78 (13)	Ret	10 (5)		**11 (5)**	11 (6)	20 (9)	87.5 (91.5)
10	(Germany) Marcel Hoppe (Germany) Peter Terting	(Belgium) #124 Mühlner Motorsport						14 (4)				87.5 (91.5)
11	(Germany) Hendrik Still	(Germany) #107 Team Mathol Racing e.V.	19 (4)			5 (1)	8 (3)			9 (4)	11 (2)	85.5
12	(Germany) Klaus Abbelen (United Kingdom) "Jules"	(Germany) #111 Frikadelli Racing Team	**25 (7)**	28 (6)	**21 (7)**	12 (6)	**13 (7)**	17 (7)	13 (7)			81.5
13	(Germany) Hendrik von Danwitz	(Germany) #111 Frikadelli Racing Team	**25 (7)**									80.5
13	(Germany) Hendrik von Danwitz	(Germany) #102 Black Falcon Team Identica					7 (2)	11 (3)	7 (3)			80.5
14	(Germany) Paul Harkema (Germany) Tim Scheerbarth	(Germany) #120 AVIA W&S Motorsport	16 (1)	Ret	16 (2)	**15 (8)**	Ret			7 (2)	13 (4)	78
15	Aleksey Veremenko	(Germany) #112 KKrämer Racing	22 (5)	30 (7)	25 (9)	17 (9)	15 (9)	18 (8)	14 (8)	Ret	18 (7)	70.5 (77.5)
16	(Germany) Dominik Fugel (Germany) Fidel Leib Jun.	(Germany) #105 ADAC Sachsen e.V. / Fugel Sport	40 (8)	24 (5)	24 (8)	Ret	16 (10)	15 (5)	15 (9)	14 (9)	DNS	70
17	(Turkey) Mustafa Mehmet Kaya (Germany) Mike Stursberg	(Germany) #103 Black Falcon Team Textar				9 (4)	11 (6)	55 (12)	12 (6)	12 (7)	16 (6)	69
18	(Germany) Felipe Fernández Laser	(Germany) #111 Frikadelli Racing Team		28 (6)		12 (6)	**13 (7)**	17 (7)	13 (7)			61.5
19	(Italy) Gabriele Piana	(Germany) #103 Black Falcon Team Textar				9 (4)	11 (6)			12 (7)	16 (6)	57
19	(Italy) Gabriele Piana	(Germany) #102 Black Falcon Team Identica									10 (1)	57
20	(Germany) Karsten Krämer	(Germany) #112 KKrämer Racing	22 (5)	30 (7)	25 (9)			18 (8)	14 (8)		18 (7)	49
20	(Germany) Karsten Krämer	(Germany) #121 KKrämer Racing	Ret									49
21	(Germany) Robin Chrzanowski (Germany) Kersten Jodexnis	(Germany) #119 Clickversicherung Team	Ret	37 (8)	60 (12)			22 (9)	16 (10)	16 (10)	19 (8)	45.5
22	(Germany) Herbert Lösch	(Germany) #112 KKrämer Racing	22 (5)	30 (7)	25 (9)	17 (9)	15 (9)					44.5
23	(Kyrgyzstan) "SELV"	(Germany) #112 KKrämer Racing					15 (9)	18 (8)	14 (8)		18 (7)	43.5
24	(Germany) Marcel Fugel	(Germany) #105 ADAC Sachsen e.V. / Fugel Sport					16 (10)	15 (5)	15 (9)	14 (9)	DNS	43
25	(Germany) David Jahn	(Germany) #120 AVIA W&S Motorsport		Ret	16 (2)	**15 (8)**	Ret					38
25	(Germany) David Jahn	(Germany) #100 Max Kruse Racing									15 (5)	38
26	(New Zealand) Peter Scharmach	(Germany) #119 Clickversicherung Team			60 (12)			22 (9)	16 (10)	16 (10)	19 (8)	37.5
27	(United Kingdom) Jim Cameron	(Germany) #113 Team Bill Cameron		54 (9)	36 (10)	Ret	23 (12)	31 (11)	19 (11)			34
28	(Germany) Bill Cameron	(Germany) #113 Team Bill Cameron		54 (9)	36 (10)		23 (12)	31 (11)	19 (11)			34
29	(Germany) Ralf-Peter Bonk (Netherlands) Marco van Ramshorst	(Germany) #106 PB-Performance			46 (11)		17 (11)	24 (10)	Ret	28 (11)	25 (10)	32.5
30	(Luxembourg) Carlos Rivas	(Germany) #102 Black Falcon Team Identica	Ret	19 (2)	18 (4)							30
31	(Netherlands) Jos Menten	(Belgium) #123 Mühlner Motorsport					10 (5)				20 (9)	23.5
32	(Germany) Christopher Mies	(Germany) #103 Black Falcon Team Textar						55 (12)	12 (6)			21
33	(Germany) Alexander Akimenkov	(Germany) #112 KKrämer Racing					15 (9)				18 (7)	19.5
34	(Germany) Moritz Östreich	(Germany) #105 ADAC Sachsen e.V. / Fugel Sport		24 (5)	24 (8)	Ret						19
35	(United States) Andrew Engelmann	(Germany) #127 Max Kruse Racing	23 (6)					57 (13)	Ret			14.5
36	(Belgium) Simon Balcaen (Germany) Jörg Viebahn	(Germany) #104 PROsport-Racing				18 (10)	Ret			13 (8)		14
37	(France) Dorian Boccolacci	(Germany) #107 Team Mathol Racing e.V.	19 (4)	**Ret**								14
38	(Germany) Thorsten Jung	(Belgium) #124 Mühlner Motorsport					14 (8)					12
39	(Germany) Leon Köhler	(Germany) #111 Frikadelli Racing Team			**21 (7)**							10
40	(United States) Peter Ludwig	(Belgium) #123 Mühlner Motorsport								11 (6)		10
41	(Germany) Heiko Hammel	(Germany) #127 Max Kruse Racing	23 (6)									10
42	(Luxembourg) Dylan Pereira	(Germany) #119 Clickversicherung Team	Ret	37 (8)								8
43	(Netherlands) Jan Jaap van Roon (Netherlands) Tom Coronel	(Germany) #127 Max Kruse Racing						57 (13)	Ret			4.5
	(Germany) Lukas Ertl	(Belgium) #124 Mühlner Motorsport									Ret	0

Colour	Result
Gold	Winner
Silver	Second place
Bronze	Third place
Green	Points classification
Blue	Non-points classification
Blue	Non-classified finish (NC)
Purple	Retired, not classified (Ret)
Red	Did not qualify (DNQ)
Red	Did not pre-qualify (DNPQ)
Black	Disqualified (DSQ)
White	Did not start (DNS)
White	Withdrew (WD)
White	Race cancelled (C)
Blank	Did not practice (DNP)
Blank	Did not arrive (DNA)
Blank	Excluded (EX)

**Bold** - Pole position

Italics - Fastest lap

(n) - Position in class

Am-Wertung

Pos.	Driver	Team	NLS1	NLS2	NLS3	NLS4	NLS5	NLS6	NLS7	NLS8	NLS9	Points
1	(Germany) Klaus Abbelen (United Kingdom) "Jules"	(Germany) #111 Frikadelli Racing Team	25 (3)	28 (1)	21 (1)	12 (2)	13 (2)	17 (1)	13 (2)			153
2	(Turkey) Mustafa Mehmet Kaya (Germany) Mike Stursberg	(Germany) #103 Black Falcon Team Textar				9 (1)	11 (1)	55 (4)	12 (1)	12 (1)	16 (1)	139.5
3	(Germany) Ralf-Peter Bonk (Netherlands) Marco van Ramshorst	(Germany) #106 PB-Performance			46 (4)		17 (4)	24 (2)	Ret	28 (3)	25 (3)	88
4	(United Kingdom) Jim Cameron	(Germany) #113 Team Bill Cameron		54 (3)	36 (3)	Ret	23 (5)	31 (3)	19 (5)			85.5
4	(Germany) Bill Cameron	(Germany) #113 Team Bill Cameron		54 (3)	36 (3)		23 (5)	31 (3)	19 (5)			85.5
5	(Germany) Herbert Lösch	(Germany) #112 KKrämer Racing	22 (1)	30 (2)	25 (2)		15 (3)					76.5
6	(Germany) Karsten Krämer	(Germany) #112 KKrämer Racing		30 (2)	25 (2)				14 (3)		18 (2)	73.5
6	(Germany) Karsten Krämer	(Germany) #121 KKrämer Racing	Ret									73.5
7	(Kyrgyzstan) "SELV"	(Germany) #112 KKrämer Racing					15 (3)		14 (3)		18 (2)	62
8	(Germany) Alexander Akimenkov	(Germany) #112 KKrämer Racing					15 (3)				18 (2)	39.5
9	(Belgium) Simon Balcaen (Germany) Jörg Viebahn	(Germany) #104 PROsport-Racing				18 (3)	Ret			13 (2)		32
10	(New Zealand) Peter Scharmach (Germany) Kersten Jodexnis	(Germany) #119 Clickversicherung Team			60 (5)				16 (4)			30.5
11	(United States) Andrew Engelmann	(Germany) #127 Max Kruse Racing	23 (2)									17

Colour	Result
Gold	Winner
Silver	Second place
Bronze	Third place
Green	Points classification
Blue	Non-points classification
Blue	Non-classified finish (NC)
Purple	Retired, not classified (Ret)
Red	Did not qualify (DNQ)
Red	Did not pre-qualify (DNPQ)
Black	Disqualified (DSQ)
White	Did not start (DNS)
White	Withdrew (WD)
White	Race cancelled (C)
Blank	Did not practice (DNP)
Blank	Did not arrive (DNA)
Blank	Excluded (EX)

(n) - Position in class

==== NLS CUP3 ====
Pos.	Driver	Team	NLS1	NLS2	NLS3	NLS4	NLS5	NLS6	NLS7	NLS8	NLS9	Points
1=	(Germany) Heiko Eichenberg (Switzerland) Patrik Grütter	(Germany) #959 SRS Team Sorg Rennsport	27 (1)	27 (2)	27 (2)	19 (1)	19 (1)	20 (1)	18 (1)	17 (1)	23 (2)	113 (135)
1=	(Germany) Fabio Grosse	(Germany) #959 SRS Team Sorg Rennsport	27 (1)	27 (2)	27 (2)	19 (1)	19 (1)	20 (1)	18 (1)	17 (1)	23 (2)	113 (135)
1=	(Germany) Fabio Grosse	(Germany) #949 SRS Team Sorg Rennsport								21 (4)		113 (135)
4	(Germany) Christopher Rink (Italy) Francesco Merlini	(Germany) #952 Smyrlis Racing	29 (3)	107 (11)	26 (1)	DNS	22 (3)	21 (2)	20 (2)	20 (3)	28 (3)	77 (78)
6	(Germany) Marius Rauer (Germany) Moritz Oberheim	(Germany) #960 AVIA W&S Motorsport	28 (2)	26 (1)	Ret	28 (4)	21 (2)	38 (10)	26 (5)	Ret	Ret	52
8	(Germany) Horst Baumann	(Germany) #950 Schmickler Performance (powered by Ravenol)	Ret	42 (8)	30 (3)	20 (2)	24 (4)	29 (6)	Ret	19 (2)	31 (5)	47
9	(Germany) Finn Zulauf	(Germany) #960 AVIA W&S Motorsport	28 (2)	26 (1)	Ret	28 (4)	21 (2)			Ret	Ret	46
10	(Germany) Stefan Beyer (Germany) Carl-Friedrich Kolb	(Germany) #949 SRS Team Sorg Rennsport	Ret	32 (4)	38 (5)	21 (3)	28 (5)	25 (3)	28 (6)	21 (4)	36 (8)	43 (44)
12	(Germany) Niclas Wiedmann (Finland) Philip Miemois	(Germany) #962 W&S Motorsport GmbH	31 (4)	29 (3)	DNS	74 (7)	DNS	27 (4)	Ret	31 (8)	22 (1)	40
14	(Germany) Niklas Öhme (Germany) Leonard Öhme (Germany) Moritz Öhme	(Germany) #944 Team Oehme	35 (6)	38 (7)	41 (7)	Ret	34 (7)	28 (5)	23 (3)	23 (5)	30 (4)	33 (35)
17	(Germany) Stefan Kruse (Austria) David Griessner	(Germany) #930 Adrenalin Motorsport Team Motec	33 (5)	33 (5)	34 (4)	Ret	29 (6)	32 (7)	25 (4)	26 (7)	35 (7)	31 (33)
19	(Germany) Florian Wolf	(Germany) #930 Adrenalin Motorsport Team Motec		33 (5)	34 (4)	Ret	29 (6)	32 (7)	25 (4)	26 (7)	35 (7)	29
20	(Germany) Philipp Stahlschmidt	(Germany) #952 Smyrlis Racing	29 (3)	107 (11)	26 (1)	DNS						24
21	(Switzerland) Mauro Calamia	(Germany) #962 W&S Motorsport GmbH	31 (4)	29 (3)	DNS	74 (7)	DNS					16
22	(Luxembourg) Sébastien Carcone	(Germany) #961 W&S Motorsport GmbH	43 (8)	52 (10)	42 (8)	30 (5)	Ret	37 (9)	Ret		90 (9)	9
23	(Germany) René Höber	(Germany) #961 W&S Motorsport GmbH	43 (8)	52 (10)	42 (8)	30 (5)	Ret				90 (9)	8
24	(United States) Cabell Fisher	(Germany) #931 Black Falcon Team Textar	64 (9)	43 (9)	39 (6)	33 (6)	Ret				Ret	8
25	(Germany) Tim-Florian Wahl	(Germany) #931 Black Falcon Team Textar	64 (9)									3
25	(Germany) Tim-Florian Wahl	(Germany) #932 Black Falcon Team Textar		69 (10)	72 (10)							3
26	(Germany) Jürgen Vöhringer	(Germany) #961 W&S Motorsport GmbH			42 (8)							1
27	(Germany) Achim Feinen (Germany) Kurt Strube	(Germany) #969 SRS Team Sorg Rennsport					66 (9)					1
Entries ineligible for championship
	(Germany) Stefan Schmickler	(Germany) #950 Schmickler Performance (powered by Ravenol)	Ret	42 (8)	30 (3)	20 (2)	24 (4)	29 (6)	Ret	19 (2)	31 (5)	
	(Germany) Marcus Schmickler	(Germany) #950 Schmickler Performance (powered by Ravenol)					24 (4)	29 (6)	Ret	19 (2)	31 (5)	
	(France) Josh Bednarski	(Germany) #952 Smyrlis Racing							20 (2)			
	(France) Josh Bednarski	(Germany) #961 W&S Motorsport GmbH									90 (9)	
	(Germany) Torsten Kratz	(Germany) #949 SRS Team Sorg Rennsport	Ret	32 (4)	38 (5)	21 (3)		25 (3)	28 (6)		36 (8)	
	(Denmark) Mads Gravsen	(Germany) #949 SRS Team Sorg Rennsport					28 (5)	25 (3)	28 (6)			
	(Germany) Matthias Beckwermert	(Germany) #930 Adrenalin Motorsport Team Motec	33 (5)				29 (6)	32 (7)	25 (4)			
	(Germany) Daniel Blickle	(Germany) #962 W&S Motorsport GmbH						27 (4)	Ret			
	(Germany) Philip Schauerte	(Germany) #949 SRS Team Sorg Rennsport					28 (5)					
	(Switzerland) Rüdiger Schicht (Germany) Alex Fielenbach	(Germany) #955 Team Mathol Racing e.V.	39 (7)	36 (6)	59 (9)	75 (8)	Ret	35 (8)	29 (7)	24 (6)	34 (6)	
	(Argentina) "Coco"	(Germany) #955 Team Mathol Racing e.V.	39 (7)	36 (6)	59 (9)							
	(Belgium) Didier Glorieux	(Germany) #931 Black Falcon Team Textar	64 (9)	43 (9)	39 (6)		Ret				Ret	
	(Germany) Martin Meenen	(Germany) #931 Black Falcon Team Textar				33 (6)	Ret					
	(Germany) Maximilian Schmidt	(Germany) #955 Team Mathol Racing e.V.								24 (6)		
	(Germany) "Iceman"	(Germany) #931 Black Falcon Team Textar				33 (6)						
	(Germany) Erik Braun	(Germany) #955 Team Mathol Racing e.V.									34 (6)	
	(Belgium) Tom Cloet	(Germany) #955 Team Mathol Racing e.V.					Ret	35 (8)	29 (7)			
	(Argentina) Marcos Adolfo Vázquez	(Germany) #955 Team Mathol Racing e.V.	39 (7)									
	(United States) Matt Kehoe	(Germany) #932 Black Falcon Team Textar					47 (8)				Ret	
	(United States) Matt Kehoe	(Germany) #931 Black Falcon Team Textar						51 (11)	40 (8)			
	(United States) Matt Kehoe	(Germany) #980 Black Falcon Team Textar									55 (10)	
	(United States) Thomas Roberts	(Germany) #932 Black Falcon Team Textar					47 (8)					
	(United States) Thomas Roberts	(Germany) #931 Black Falcon Team Textar						51 (11)	40 (8)			
	(Ukraine) Oleksiy Kikireshko	(Germany) #932 Black Falcon Team Textar					47 (8)					
	(Ukraine) Oleksiy Kikireshko	(Germany) #969 SRS Team Sorg Rennsport						Ret	42 (9)	62 (9)	87 (11)	
	(Germany) Axel Sartingen	(Germany) #932 Black Falcon Team Textar	51 (9)		72 (10)			33 (8)				
	(Germany) Axel Sartingen	(Germany) #931 Black Falcon Team Textar									Ret	
	(Germany) Daniel Schwerfeld	(Germany) #932 Black Falcon Team Textar	51 (9)	69 (10)				33 (8)				
	(Italy) Daniele di Amato	(Germany) #931 Black Falcon Team Textar						51 (11)	40 (8)			
	(Italy) Daniele di Amato	(Germany) #932 Black Falcon Team Textar									Ret	
	(Germany) "Montana"	(Germany) #955 Team Mathol Racing e.V.				75 (8)						
	(Germany) Lennard Paul Naumann	(Germany) #969 SRS Team Sorg Rennsport						Ret	42 (9)	62 (9)		
	(Germany) Philipp Beyerle	(Germany) #969 SRS Team Sorg Rennsport					66 (9)		42 (9)			
	(Germany) Hans Joachim Theiß	(Germany) #969 SRS Team Sorg Rennsport					66 (9)				87 (11)	
	(United States) Andreas Gabler	(Germany) #961 W&S Motorsport GmbH					Ret	37 (9)	Ret			
	(Germany) Henning Eschweiler	(Germany) #969 SRS Team Sorg Rennsport						Ret	42 (9)			
	(Italy) Gabriele Piana	(Germany) #931 Black Falcon Team Textar		43 (9)								
	(Italy) Alberto Di Folco (Germany) Salman Owega	(Germany) #954 Team Mathol Racing e.V.									43 (9)	
	(Mexico) Benito Tagle	(Germany) #969 SRS Team Sorg Rennsport								62 (9)		
	(United States) Mark Smith	(Germany) #980 Black Falcon Team Textar									55 (10)	
	(United States) Mark Smith	(Germany) #932 Black Falcon Team Textar									Ret	
	(Germany) Heinz Dolfen	(Germany) #961 W&S Motorsport GmbH		52 (10)								
	(Netherlands) Morris Schuring	(Germany) #980 Black Falcon Team Textar									55 (10)	
	(Austria) Luca Rettenbacher (Germany) David Kiefer (Germany) Marius Kiefer (Germany) Stefan Kiefer	(Germany) #963 Huber Racing	67 (11)									
	(Germany) Guido Tönnessen	(Germany) #977 KKrämer Racing	Ret	112 (13)	Ret							
	(Germany) Constantin Berz (Germany) Marcus Bers (Germany) Kai Riemer	(Germany) #951 Schmickler Performance (powered by Ravenol)						56 (13)	Ret			
	(Germany) Olaf Baunack (Germany) Karl-Heinz Meyer (Switzerland) Michelangelo Comazzi	(Germany) #977 KKrämer Racing		112 (13)								
	(United States) Kevin Clifford	(Germany) #977 KKrämer Racing	Ret		Ret							
	(Spain) Jose Casares Garcia	(Germany) #969 SRS Team Sorg Rennsport						Ret				
	(Spain) Jose Casares Garcia	(Germany) #979 Lionspeed GP							Ret			
	(United States) Daniel Miller (Germany) Patrick Kolb	(Germany) #979 Lionspeed GP						DNS	Ret			
	(Germany) Anke Lawenstein	(Germany) #977 KKrämer Racing	Ret									
	(New Zealand) Grant Dalton (New Zealand) Grant Woolford (United Kingdom) James Breakell	(New Zealand) #933 (Dalton, Woolford & Breakell)			Ret							

Colour	Result
Gold	Winner
Silver	Second place
Bronze	Third place
Green	Points classification
Blue	Non-points classification
Blue	Non-classified finish (NC)
Purple	Retired, not classified (Ret)
Red	Did not qualify (DNQ)
Red	Did not pre-qualify (DNPQ)
Black	Disqualified (DSQ)
White	Did not start (DNS)
White	Withdrew (WD)
White	Race cancelled (C)
Blank	Did not practice (DNP)
Blank	Did not arrive (DNA)
Blank	Excluded (EX)

(n) - Position in class

==== Porsche Endurance Trophy Nürburgring CUP3 ====
Pos.	Driver	Team	NLS1	NLS2	NLS3	NLS4	NLS5	NLS6	NLS7	NLS8	NLS9	Points
1	(Germany) Heiko Eichenberg (Germany) Fabio Grosse (Switzerland) Patrik Grütter	(Germany) #959 SRS Team Sorg Rennsport	27 (1)	27 (2)	27 (2)	**19 (1)**	**19 (1)**	**20 (1)**	18 (1)	17 (1)	23 (2)	172 (207)
2	(Italy) Francesco Merlini (Germany) Christopher Rink	(Germany) #952 Smyrlis Racing	29 (3)	107 (11)	26 (1)	DNS	22 (3)	21 (2)	20 (2)	20 (3)	28 (3)	138.5 (143.5)
3	(Germany) Moritz Oberheim (Germany) Marius Rauer	(Germany) #960 AVIA W&S Motorsport	**28 (2)**	26 (1)	**Ret**	28 (4)	21 (2)	38 (10)	**26 (5)**	Ret	Ret	109
4	(Germany) Stefan Beyer (Germany) Carl-Friedrich Kolb	(Germany) #949 SRS Team Sorg Rennsport	Ret	32 (4)	38 (5)	21 (3)	28 (5)	25 (3)	28 (6)	**21 (4)**	36 (8)	108 (116)
5	(Germany) Horst Baumann (Germany) Stefan Schmickler	(Germany) #950 Schmickler Performance (powered by Ravenol)	Ret	42 (8)	30 (3)	20 (2)	24 (4)	29 (6)	Ret	19 (2)	31 (5)	102.5
6	(Germany) Leonard Öhme (Germany) Moritz Öhme (Germany) Niklas Öhme	(Germany) #944 Team Oehme	35 (6)	38 (7)	41 (7)	Ret	34 (7)	28 (5)	23 (3)	23 (5)	30 (4)	95.5 (104.5)
7	(Austria) David Griessner (Germany) Stefan Kruse	(Germany) #930 Adrenalin Motorsport Team Motec	33 (5)	33 (5)	34 (4)	Ret	29 (6)	32 (7)	25 (4)	26 (7)	**35 (7)**	93 (102)
8	(Germany) Florian Wolf	(Germany) #930 Adrenalin Motorsport Team Motec		33 (5)	34 (4)	Ret	29 (6)	32 (7)	25 (4)	26 (7)	**35 (7)**	91
9	(Germany) Torsten Kratz	(Germany) #949 SRS Team Sorg Rennsport	Ret	32 (4)	38 (5)	21 (3)		25 (3)	28 (6)		36 (8)	84.5
10	(Finland) Philip Miemois (Germany) Niclas Wiedmann	(Germany) #962 W&S Motorsport GmbH	31 (4)	29 (3)	DNS	74 (7)	DNS	27 (4)	Ret	31 (8)	22 (1)	84.5
11	(Germany) Finn Zulauf	(Germany) #960 AVIA W&S Motorsport	**28 (2)**	26 (1)	**Ret**	28 (4)	21 (2)			Ret	Ret	80.5
12	(Germany) Alex Fielenbach (Switzerland) Rüdiger Schicht	(Germany) #955 Team Mathol Racing e.V.	39 (7)	36 (6)	59 (9)	75 (8)	Ret	35 (8)	29 (7)	24 (6)	34 (6)	72.5 (79.5)
13	(Germany) Matthias Beckwermert	(Germany) #930 Adrenalin Motorsport Team Motec	33 (5)				29 (6)	32 (7)	25 (4)			59
14	(Denmark) Mads Gravsen	(Germany) #949 SRS Team Sorg Rennsport					28 (5)	25 (3)	28 (6)			54
15	(Germany) Marcus Schmickler	(Germany) #950 Schmickler Performance (powered by Ravenol)					24 (4)	29 (6)	Ret	19 (2)	WD	51.5
16	(Luxembourg) Sébastien Carcone	(Germany) #961 W&S Motorsport GmbH	43 (8)	52 (10)	42 (8)	30 (5)	Ret	37 (9)	Ret		90 (9)	50.5
17	(Germany) Philipp Stahlschmidt	(Germany) #952 Smyrlis Racing	29 (3)	107 (11)	26 (1)	DNS						40
18	(Germany) René Höber	(Germany) #961 W&S Motorsport GmbH	43 (8)	52 (10)	42 (8)	30 (5)	Ret				90 (9)	40
19	(Switzerland) Mauro Calamia	(Germany) #962 W&S Motorsport GmbH	31 (4)	29 (3)	DNS	74 (7)	DNS					37
20	(United States) Cabell Fisher	(Germany) #931 Black Falcon Team Textar	64 (9)	**43 (9)**	39 (6)	33 (6)	Ret				Ret	35
21	(France) Josh Bednarski	(Germany) #952 Smyrlis Racing							20 (2)			32.5
21	(France) Josh Bednarski	(Germany) #961 W&S Motorsport GmbH									90 (9)	32.5
22	(Argentina) "Coco"	(Germany) #955 Team Mathol Racing e.V.	39 (7)	36 (6)	59 (9)							26
23	(Belgium) Tom Cloet	(Germany) #955 Team Mathol Racing e.V.					Ret	35 (8)	29 (7)			25.5
24	(Belgium) Didier Glorieux	(Germany) #931 Black Falcon Team Textar	64 (9)	**43 (9)**	39 (6)		Ret				Ret	25
25	(Italy) Daniele di Amato (United States) Matt Kehoe (United States) Thomas Roberts	(Germany) #931 Black Falcon Team Textar						51 (11)	40 (8)			19.5
26	(Germany) Daniel Blickle	(Germany) #962 W&S Motorsport GmbH						27 (4)	Ret			19.5
27	(Germany) Philip Schauerte	(Germany) #949 SRS Team Sorg Rennsport					28 (5)					16.5
28	(United States) Andreas Gabler	(Germany) #961 W&S Motorsport GmbH					Ret	37 (9)	Ret			10.5
29	(Germany) Martin Meenen	(Germany) #931 Black Falcon Team Textar				33 (6)	Ret					10
30	(Germany) "Iceman"	(Germany) #931 Black Falcon Team Textar				33 (6)						10
31	(Germany) Maximilian Schmidt	(Germany) #955 Team Mathol Racing e.V.								24 (6)		10
32	(Germany) Erik Braun	(Germany) #955 Team Mathol Racing e.V.									34 (6)	10
33	(Argentina) Marcos Adolfo Vázquez	(Germany) #955 Team Mathol Racing e.V.	39 (7)									9
34	(Italy) Gabriele Piana	(Germany) #931 Black Falcon Team Textar		**43 (9)**								8
35	(Germany) "Montana"	(Germany) #955 Team Mathol Racing e.V.				75 (8)						8
36	(Germany) Jürgen Vöhringer	(Germany) #961 W&S Motorsport GmbH			42 (8)							8
37	(Germany) Tim-Florian Wahl	(Germany) #931 Black Falcon Team Textar	64 (9)									7
38	(Germany) Heinz Dolfen	(Germany) #961 W&S Motorsport GmbH		52 (10)								6

Colour	Result
Gold	Winner
Silver	Second place
Bronze	Third place
Green	Points classification
Blue	Non-points classification
Blue	Non-classified finish (NC)
Purple	Retired, not classified (Ret)
Red	Did not qualify (DNQ)
Red	Did not pre-qualify (DNPQ)
Black	Disqualified (DSQ)
White	Did not start (DNS)
White	Withdrew (WD)
White	Race cancelled (C)
Blank	Did not practice (DNP)
Blank	Did not arrive (DNA)
Blank	Excluded (EX)

**Bold** - Pole position

Italics - Fastest lap

(n) - Position in class

CUP3 Am-Wertung

Pos.	Driver	Team	NLS1	NLS2	NLS3	NLS4	NLS5	NLS6	NLS7	NLS8	NLS9	Points
1	(Germany) Stefan Beyer (Germany) Carl-Friedrich Kolb	(Germany) #949 SRS Team Sorg Rennsport	Ret	32 (1)	38 (3)	21 (2)	28 (2)	25 (1)	28 (3)	21 (2)	36 (5)	147 (158)
2	(Germany) Horst Baumann	(Germany) #950 Schmickler Performance (powered by Ravenol)	Ret	42 (5)	30 (1)	20 (1)	24 (1)	29 (3)	Ret	19 (1)	31 (2)	140.5
3	(Germany) Leonard Öhme (Germany) Moritz Öhme (Germany) Niklas Öhme	(Germany) #944 Team Oehme	35 (2)	38 (4)	41 (5)	Ret	34 (4)	28 (2)	23 (1)	23 (3)	30 (1)	140 (151)
4	(Germany) Stefan Kruse	(Germany) #930 Adrenalin Motorsport Team Motec	33 (1)	33 (2)	34 (2)	Ret	29 (3)	32 (4)	25 (2)	26 (5)	35 (4)	134.5 (145.5)
5	(Germany) Florian Wolf	(Germany) #930 Adrenalin Motorsport Team Motec		33 (2)	34 (2)	Ret	29 (3)	32 (4)	25 (2)	26 (5)	35 (4)	125.5
6	(Germany) Alex Fielenbach (Switzerland) Rüdiger Schicht	(Germany) #955 Team Mathol Racing e.V.	39 (3)	36 (3)	59 (7)	75 (5)	Ret	35 (5)	29 (4)	24 (4)	34 (3)	105 (114)
7	(Germany) Matthias Beckwermert	(Germany) #930 Adrenalin Motorsport Team Motec	33 (1)				29 (3)	32 (4)	25 (2)			87.5
8	(Denmark) Mads Gravsen	(Germany) #949 SRS Team Sorg Rennsport					28 (2)	25 (1)	28 (3)			78
9	(Germany) Marcus Schmickler	(Germany) #950 Schmickler Performance (powered by Ravenol)					24 (1)	29 (3)	Ret	19 (1)	WD	72.5
10	(Luxembourg) Sébastien Carcone	(Germany) #961 W&S Motorsport GmbH	43 (4)	52 (7)	42 (6)	30 (3)	Ret	37 (6)	Ret			62
11	(United States) Cabell Fisher	(Germany) #931 Black Falcon Team Textar	64 (5)	43 (6)	39 (4)	33 (4)	Ret				Ret	47
12	(Germany) René Höber	(Germany) #961 W&S Motorsport GmbH	43 (4)	52 (7)	42 (6)	30 (3)	Ret					47
13	(Argentina) "Coco"	(Germany) #955 Team Mathol Racing e.V.	39 (3)	36 (3)	59 (7)							39
14	(Belgium) Tom Cloet	(Germany) #955 Team Mathol Racing e.V.					Ret	35 (5)	29 (4)			36
15	(Belgium) Didier Glorieux	(Germany) #931 Black Falcon Team Textar	64 (5)	43 (6)	39 (4)		Ret				Ret	34
16	(Italy) Daniele di Amato (United States) Matt Kehoe (United States) Thomas Roberts	(Germany) #931 Black Falcon Team Textar						51 (7)	40 (5)			30
17	(Germany) Philip Schauerte	(Germany) #949 SRS Team Sorg Rennsport					28 (2)					25.5
18	(Argentina) Marcos Adolfo Vázquez	(Germany) #955 Team Mathol Racing e.V.	39 (3)									15
19	(Germany) Erik Braun	(Germany) #955 Team Mathol Racing e.V.									34 (3)	15
20	(United States) Andreas Gabler	(Germany) #961 W&S Motorsport GmbH					Ret	37 (6)	Ret			15
21	(Germany) Martin Meenen	(Germany) #931 Black Falcon Team Textar				33 (4)	Ret					10
21	(Germany) "Iceman"	(Germany) #931 Black Falcon Team Textar				33 (4)						10
22	(Germany) Maximilian Schmidt	(Germany) #955 Team Mathol Racing e.V.								24 (4)		13
23	(Germany) "Montana"	(Germany) #955 Team Mathol Racing e.V.				75 (5)						11
24	(Germany) Jürgen Vöhringer	(Germany) #961 W&S Motorsport GmbH			42 (6)							10
25	(Germany) Heinz Dolfen	(Germany) #961 W&S Motorsport GmbH		52 (7)								9

Colour	Result
Gold	Winner
Silver	Second place
Bronze	Third place
Green	Points classification
Blue	Non-points classification
Blue	Non-classified finish (NC)
Purple	Retired, not classified (Ret)
Red	Did not qualify (DNQ)
Red	Did not pre-qualify (DNPQ)
Black	Disqualified (DSQ)
White	Did not start (DNS)
White	Withdrew (WD)
White	Race cancelled (C)
Blank	Did not practice (DNP)
Blank	Did not arrive (DNA)
Blank	Excluded (EX)

(n) - Position in class

==== BMW M240i Cup ====
Pos.	Driver	Team	NLS1	NLS2	NLS3	NLS4	NLS5	NLS6	NLS7	NLS8	NLS9	Points
1	(Germany) Sven Markert (Germany) Nils Steinberg (Germany) Yannick Fübrich	(Germany) #650 Adrenalin Motorsport Team Motec	46 (1)	50 (1)	54 (1)	38 (1)	36 (1)	Ret	DNS	36 (1)	40 (1)	109
4=	(Germany) Aaron Wenisch	(Germany) #651 Adrenalin Motorsport Team Motec	59 (4)	71 (5)	68 (5)	47 (3)	Ret	49 (2)	35 (2)	39 (2)	44 (3)	65 (69)
4=	(Germany) Marvin Marino	(Germany) #651 Adrenalin Motorsport Team Motec	59 (4)	71 (5)	68 (5)	47 (3)	Ret	49 (2)	35 (2)	39 (2)	44 (3)	65 (69)
4=	(Germany) Marvin Marino	(Germany) #655 Adrenalin Motorsport Team Motec						59 (3)				65 (69)
6	(Germany) Michael Sander	(Germany) #666 Schnitzelalm Racing	48 (2)	58 (2)	57 (3)	Ret	Ret	Ret	34 (1)	77 (6)	41 (2)	63
6	(Germany) Michael Sander	(Germany) #674 Schnitzelalm Racing		59 (3)							56 (5)	63
7=	(Germany) Anton Ruf	(Germany) #660 Smyrlis Racing	53 (3)	64 (4)	56 (2)	40 (2)	59 (3)	Ret		Ret		46
7=	(Germany) Roland Fröse	(Germany) #660 Smyrlis Racing	53 (3)	64 (4)	56 (2)	40 (2)	59 (3)			Ret		46
9	(Germany) Daniel Rexhausen	(Germany) #660 Smyrlis Racing	53 (3)	64 (4)	56 (2)							30
9	(Germany) Daniel Rexhausen	(Germany) #662 Smyrlis Racing						83 (5)				30
10	(Germany) Christian Kraus	(Germany) #652 Adrenalin Motorsport Team Motec	71 (5)	80 (6)	81 (6)	59 (5)		71 (4)	52 (4)			30
10	(Germany) Christian Kraus	(Germany) #655 Adrenalin Motorsport Team Motec							Ret			30
11	(Germany) Alexander Müller	(Germany) #652 Adrenalin Motorsport Team Motec	71 (5)		81 (6)	59 (5)		71 (4)	52 (4)			27
12	(Germany) Markus Nölken	(Germany) #653 Team mcchip-dkr		89 (7)	87 (7)		46 (2)	Ret	Ret	55 (4)	74 (8)	25
13	(Finland) Juuso Puhakka	(Germany) #666 Schnitzelalm Racing	48 (2)		57 (3)							19
14	(Germany) Marco Büsker	(Germany) #651 Adrenalin Motorsport Team Motec	59 (4)	71 (5)	68 (5)							14
15=	(Netherlands) Colin Caresani	(Germany) #665 Schnitzelalm Racing	Ret									11
15=	(Netherlands) Colin Caresani	(Germany) #666 Schnitzelalm Racing		58 (2)								11
15=	(Netherlands) Colin Caresani	(Germany) #674 Schnitzelalm Racing		59 (3)								11
15=	(Germany) Dr. Anton Hahnenkamm	(Germany) #666 Schnitzelalm Racing	48 (2)									11
15=	(Germany) Marcel Marchewicz	(Germany) #666 Schnitzelalm Racing						Ret	34‡ (1)		41 (2)	11
18	(Germany) Benno Zerlin	(Germany) #691 Eifelkind Racing / MSC SINZIG e.V. im ADAC	DNS		62 (4)	Ret	Ret	Ret			68 (7)	8
Entries ineligible for championship
	(Germany) Jay Mo Härtling	(Germany) #674 Schnitzelalm Racing	82 (6)									
	(Germany) Jay Mo Härtling	(Germany) #666 Schnitzelalm Racing					Ret	Ret	34 (1)		41 (2)	
	(Germany) Tim Neuser	(Germany) #666 Schnitzelalm Racing						Ret	34 (1)		41 (2)	
	(Germany) Nick Deißler	(Germany) #650 Adrenalin Motorsport Team Motec					36 (1)	Ret	DNS			
	(Germany) Nick Deißler	(Germany) #655 Adrenalin Motorsport Team Motec								Ret		
	(United States) Jonathan Miller (Canada) Samantha Tan (United States) Bryson Morris	(Germany) #665 Schnitzelalm Racing					76 (5)	45 (1)	38 (3)			
	(Germany) Alex Hardt	(Germany) #651 Adrenalin Motorsport Team Motec						49 (2)	35 (2)	39 (2)	44 (3)	
	(Switzerland) Michelangelo Comazzi	(Germany) #651 Adrenalin Motorsport Team Motec				47 (3)		49 (2)	35 (2)			
	(France) Josh Bednarski	(Germany) #660 Smyrlis Racing				40 (2)	59 (3)	Ret				
	(Germany) Carl-Friedrich Kolb	(Germany) #653 Team mcchip-dkr					46 (2)					
	(Estonia) Ralf Aron	(Germany) #665 Schnitzelalm Racing	Ret									
	(Estonia) Ralf Aron	(Germany) #666 Schnitzelalm Racing		58 (2)								
	(Estonia) Ralf Aron	(Germany) #674 Schnitzelalm Racing		59 (3)								
	(Germany) Marek Böckmann	(Germany) #666 Schnitzelalm Racing		58 (2)								
	(Germany) Marek Böckmann	(Germany) #674 Schnitzelalm Racing		59 (3)								
	(Germany) Yannick Himmels	(Germany) #655 Adrenalin Motorsport Team Motec						59 (3)				
	(Germany) Yannick Himmels	(Germany) #652 Adrenalin Motorsport Team Motec								51 (3)	Ret	
	(Germany) Michel Albers	(Germany) #652 Adrenalin Motorsport Team Motec								51 (3)		
	(Germany) Michel Albers	(Germany) #651 Adrenalin Motorsport Team Motec					Ret					
	(Germany) Michel Albers	(Germany) #680 Up2Race									51 (4)	
	(United States) Michael Skeen	(Germany) #652 Adrenalin Motorsport Team Motec								51 (3)		
	(Germany) Carlo Scholl	(Germany) #666 Schnitzelalm Racing			57 (3)							
	(Germany) Sascha Steinhardt (Germany) Simon Paul Klemund	(Germany) #655 Adrenalin Motorsport Team Motec						59 (3)				
	(Germany) Lars Harbeck	(Germany) #652 Adrenalin Motorsport Team Motec	71 (5)	80 (6)	81 (6)	59 (5)		71 (4)	52 (4)			
	(Germany) Lars Harbeck	(Germany) #655 Adrenalin Motorsport Team Motec							Ret			
	(Germany) Sascha Lott	(Germany) #653 Team mcchip-dkr	Ret	89 (7)	87 (7)	52 (4)				55 (4)		
	(Germany) Lucas Lange	(Germany) #653 Team mcchip-dkr				52 (4)				55 (4)		
	(Germany) Kevin Wambach	(Germany) #691 Eifelkind Racing / MSC SINZIG e.V. im ADAC	DNS		62 (4)			Ret				
	(Germany) Christoph Merkt	(Germany) #651 Adrenalin Motorsport Team Motec					Ret					
	(Germany) Christoph Merkt	(Germany) #652 Adrenalin Motorsport Team Motec						71 (4)				
	(Germany) Christoph Merkt	(Germany) #655 Adrenalin Motorsport Team Motec								Ret		
	(Switzerland) Dominic Kulpowicz	(Germany) #691 Eifelkind Racing / MSC SINZIG e.V. im ADAC	DNS		62 (4)							
	(Germany) Anton Abee (Germany) Timo Glock	(Germany) #680 Up2Race									51 (4)	
	(United States) Daniel Bloom (United States) Joshua Jacobs (United States) Judson Holt (United States) Denny Stripling	(Germany) #655 Adrenalin Motorsport Team Motec					60 (4)					
	(Germany) Andreas Müller (Germany) Michael Frigge	(Germany) #662 Smyrlis Racing						83 (5)	58 (5)			
	(Germany) Philip Wiskirchen	(Germany) #666 Schnitzelalm Racing					Ret			77 (6)		
	(Germany) Philip Wiskirchen	(Germany) #674 Schnitzelalm Racing									56 (5)	
	(France) Adrien Paviot (France) Valentin Belgy (France) Nikolas Markiewicz	(Germany) #665 Schnitzelalm Racing								59 (5)	59 (6)	
	(Germany) Jacob Riegel	(Germany) #660 Smyrlis Racing						Ret		Ret		
	(Germany) Jacob Riegel	(Germany) #662 Smyrlis Racing							58 (5)			
	(Luxembourg) Gil Linster	(Germany) #674 Schnitzelalm Racing									56 (5)	
	(Germany) Markus Eichele	(Germany) #666 Schnitzelalm Racing								77 (6)		
	(United Kingdom) Bailey Voisin	(Germany) #652 Adrenalin Motorsport Team Motec		80 (6)								
	(Germany) Walter Wilhelm Laschet (Germany) Fabio Laschet	(Germany) #674 Schnitzelalm Racing	82 (6)									
	(Germany) Sascha Hancke	(Germany) #653 Team mcchip-dkr						Ret	Ret		74 (8)	
	(Germany) Timo Kieslich	(Germany) #665 Schnitzelalm Racing	Ret									
	(Germany) Timo Kieslich	(Germany) #666 Schnitzelalm Racing					Ret					
	(Austria) Maximilian Vogl	(Germany) #691 Eifelkind Racing / MSC SINZIG e.V. im ADAC				Ret	Ret					
	(Italy) Lorenzo Medori (Italy) Simone Sama (Italy) Andrea Sapino	(Germany) #661 Smyrlis Racing				Ret	Ret					
	(Germany) Florian Sternkopf	(Germany) #653 Team mcchip-dkr	Ret									
	(Netherlands) Thierry Vermeulen (Finland) Konsta Lappalainen	(Germany) #666 Schnitzelalm Racing				Ret						
	(United States) Andrie Hartanto (United States) Patrick Chio	(Germany) #652 Adrenalin Motorsport Team Motec					Ret					
	(Germany) Philipp Gresek	(Germany) #691 Eifelkind Racing / MSC SINZIG e.V. im ADAC					Ret					
	(Germany) Maximilian Struwe	(Germany) #653 Team mcchip-dkr						Ret				
	(Germany) Klaus Faßbender	(Germany) #655 Adrenalin Motorsport Team Motec							Ret			
	(Germany) Philip Schauerte	(Germany) #655 Adrenalin Motorsport Team Motec								Ret		
	(Switzerland) John Larsson (Germany) Andreas Winkler	(Germany) #652 Adrenalin Motorsport Team Motec									Ret	
	(Germany) "Sub7BTG" (France) Grégoire Boutonnet (France) Laurent Laparra	(Germany) #655 Adrenalin Motorsport Team Motec									DNS	

‡: Result not counted for classification

Colour	Result
Gold	Winner
Silver	Second place
Bronze	Third place
Green	Points classification
Blue	Non-points classification
Blue	Non-classified finish (NC)
Purple	Retired, not classified (Ret)
Red	Did not qualify (DNQ)
Red	Did not pre-qualify (DNPQ)
Black	Disqualified (DSQ)
White	Did not start (DNS)
White	Withdrew (WD)
White	Race cancelled (C)
Blank	Did not practice (DNP)
Blank	Did not arrive (DNA)
Blank	Excluded (EX)

(n) - Position in class

==== BMW M2 CS Cup ====
Pos.	Driver	Team	NLS1	NLS2	NLS3	NLS4	NLS5	NLS6	NLS7	NLS8	NLS9	Points
1	(Switzerland) Ranko Mijatović	(Germany) #899 (Thomas Leyherr)								43 (1)	82‡ (1)	2
Entries ineligible for championship
	(Denmark) Peter Larsen (Sweden) Johan Rosèn	(Denmark) / (Sweden) #884 (Larsen & Rosèn)			80 (2)	45 (1)	43 (1)	64 (1)	Ret			
	(Germany) Michael von Zabiensky (Denmark) Andreas Jochimsen	(Germany) #888 Schubert Motorsport GmbH	45 (1)	51 (1)	61 (1)							
	(Germany) Thomas Leyherr	(Germany) #899 (Thomas Leyherr)				48 (2)				43 (1)	82 (1)	
	(Germany) Friedhelm Thelen	(Norway) / (Sweden) #884 (Larsen & Rosèn)						64 (1)	Ret			
	(Germany) Torsten Schubert	(Germany) #888 Schubert Motorsport GmbH	45 (1)									
	(Germany) Stefan von Zabiensky	(Germany) #888 Schubert Motorsport GmbH			61 (1)							
	(Germany) Michael Mönch	(Norway) / (Sweden) #884 (Larsen & Rosèn)						64 (1)				
	(Germany) Klaus Faßbender	(Germany) #899 (Thomas Leyherr)				48 (2)						

‡: Result not counted for classification

Colour	Result
Gold	Winner
Silver	Second place
Bronze	Third place
Green	Points classification
Blue	Non-points classification
Blue	Non-classified finish (NC)
Purple	Retired, not classified (Ret)
Red	Did not qualify (DNQ)
Red	Did not pre-qualify (DNPQ)
Black	Disqualified (DSQ)
White	Did not start (DNS)
White	Withdrew (WD)
White	Race cancelled (C)
Blank	Did not practice (DNP)
Blank	Did not arrive (DNA)
Blank	Excluded (EX)

(n) - Position in class

==== H4 ====
Pos.	Driver	Team	NLS1	NLS2	NLS3	NLS4	NLS5	NLS6	NLS7	NLS8	NLS9	Points
1	(Germany) Bernd Kleeschulte	(Germany) #600 DSK e.V.	Ret	57 (1)	69 (1)	39 (1)		87 (1)				11
2	(Germany) David Ackermann	(Germany) #600 DSK e.V.			69 (1)			87 (1)				6
Entries ineligible for championship
	(Germany) Michael Kroll (Germany) Alexander Prinz	(Germany) #602 Hofor - Racing			Ret							
	(Germany) Michael Kroll (Germany) Alexander Prinz	(Germany) #605 Hofor - Racing				44 (2)	45 (1)			49 (1)	98 (1)	
	(Switzerland) Chantal Prinz	(Germany) #602 Hofor - Racing			Ret							
	(Switzerland) Chantal Prinz	(Germany) #605 Hofor - Racing								49 (1)		
	(Germany) Thomas Mühlenz	(Germany) #605 Hofor - Racing					45 (1)					
	(Germany) Bernd Küpper	(Germany) #600 DSK e.V.						87 (1)				
	(Germany) Martin Kroll	(Germany) #602 Hofor - Racing			Ret							
	(Germany) Martin Kroll	(Germany) #605 Hofor - Racing				44 (2)						

Colour	Result
Gold	Winner
Silver	Second place
Bronze	Third place
Green	Points classification
Blue	Non-points classification
Blue	Non-classified finish (NC)
Purple	Retired, not classified (Ret)
Red	Did not qualify (DNQ)
Red	Did not pre-qualify (DNPQ)
Black	Disqualified (DSQ)
White	Did not start (DNS)
White	Withdrew (WD)
White	Race cancelled (C)
Blank	Did not practice (DNP)
Blank	Did not arrive (DNA)
Blank	Excluded (EX)

(n) - Position in class

=== Teams classification ===
==== NLS Speed-Trophäe (Overall) ====
Displaying entries that has achieved top 20 finish and/or top 3 qualifying in at least 1 round.

Pos.	Team	Class	NLS1	NLS2	NLS3	NLS4	NLS5	NLS6	NLS7	NLS8	NLS9	Points
1	(Germany) #34 Walkenhorst Motorsport	SP9 Pro	**Ret**^{1}	1	Ret	1^{2}	Ret^{2}	1	1	1	4^{2}	206
2	(Germany) #5 Scherer Sport PHX	SP9 Pro	Ret^{2}	49	7^{3}	**4**^{1}	**Ret**^{1}	Ret	**Ret**^{1}	**3**^{1}	**1**^{1}	116
3	(Germany) #3 Falken Motorsports	SP9 Pro	12	4	5		1^{3}	2			Ret	115
4	(Germany) #17 PROsport-Racing	SP9 Am	15	22								102
4	(Germany) #17 PROsport-Racing	SP9 Pro-Am			14	3^{3}	4	Ret	3^{2}	Ret^{2}	9	102
5	(Germany) #121 KKrämer Racing	CUP2	Ret	18	15	7	9	9	6	6	12	94
6	(Germany) #35 Walkenhorst Motorsport	SP9 Pro	37	12	Ret	Ret	Ret	7	2	5^{3}	7	90
7	(Germany) #100 Max Kruse Racing	CUP2	18	21	17	6	5	8	5	DSQ	15	85
8	(Germany) #102 Black Falcon Team Identica	CUP2	Ret	19	18	10	7	11	7	8	10	83
9	(Germany) #44 BMW Junior Team	SP9 Pro	5	3	1^{2}							82
10=	(Germany) #11 Schnitzelalm Racing	SP9 Pro	3	15	Ret	Ret	2	5	Ret	DNS		79
10=	(Germany) #107 Team Mathol Racing e.V.	CUP2	19	Ret	19	5	8	16	8	9	11	79
12	(Germany) #4 Falken Motorsports	SP9 Pro	9	9	8		DSQ	3			17	67
13	(Germany) #99 ROWE Racing	SP9 Pro	1	Ret^{2}	2							65
14	(Germany) #21 Rutronik Racing	SP9 Pro	13	**2**^{1}	DSQ						3	64
15	(Germany) #19 racing one	SP9 Pro-Am		DNS	12		6	**6**^{1}	Ret^{3}	Ret		49
16	(Germany) #30 Frikadelli Racing Team	SP9 Pro-Am	21								Ret	46
16	(Germany) #30 Frikadelli Racing Team	SP9 Pro		Ret	6					2		46
17	(Germany) #98 ROWE Racing	SP9 Pro	Ret^{3}	6	**4**^{1}							44
18	(Germany) #120 AVIA W&S Motorsport	CUP2	16	Ret	16	15	Ret			7	13	40
19=	(Germany) #50 équipe vitesse	SP9 Am		35		14	12	13	9			36
19=	(Belgium) #123 Mühlner Motorsport	CUP2	17	DSQ	78	Ret	10		11	11	20	36
19=	(Germany) #911 Manthey EMA	SP9 Pro	7	5								36
22	(Belgium) #124 Mühlner Motorsport	CUP2	66	23	20	13	14	14		10	Ret	34
23	(United States) #45 CP Racing	SP9 Pro-Am	24	25	23	16		12^{3}	10	DNS	14	33
24	(Germany) #111 Frikadelli Racing Team	CUP2	25	28	21	12	13	17	13			29
25	(Germany) #16 Scherer Sport PHX	SP9 Pro	2	47	Ret							28
26	(Germany) #25 Huber Motorsport	SP9 Pro-Am	20		99	8		10	Ret			27
26	(Germany) #25 Huber Motorsport	SP9 Pro		20								27
27	(Germany) #8 Mercedes-AMG Team Bilstein	SP9 Pro	6	14	Ret							25
28	(Germany) #105 ADAC Sachsen e.V.	CUP2	40	24	24	Ret	16	15	15	14	DNS	24
29	(Germany) #112 KKrämer Racing	CUP2	22	30	25	17	15	18	14	Ret	18	23
30	(Germany) #27 Abt Sportsline	SP9 Pro	8	13								22
31	(Germany) #22 Wochenspiegel Team Monschau by Rinaldi Racing	SP9 Pro	10		11							21
31	(Germany) #22 Wochenspiegel Team Monschau by Rinaldi Racing	SP9 Pro-Am		Ret								21
32	(Germany) #6 Haupt Racing Team	SP9 Pro	11	16							85	15
33	(Germany) #959 SRS Team Sorg Rennsport	CUP3	27	27	27	19	19	20	18	17	23	12
34	(Germany) #187 FK Performance Motorsport	SP10	30	31	29	Ret	20	26	17	18	26	8
35	(Germany) #125 Huber Motorsport	CUP2	26				25			15	24	6
36=	(Germany) #7 Konrad Motorsport	SP9 Pro	Ret	17								4
36=	(Germany) #106 PB-Performance	CUP2			46		17	24	Ret	28	25	4
38	(Germany) #950 Schmickler Performance (powered by Ravenol)	CUP3	Ret	42	30	20	24	29	Ret	19	31	3
39=	(Germany) #113 Team Bill Cameron	CUP2		54	36	Ret	23	31	19			2
39=	(Germany) #320 Four Motors Bioconcept-Car	AT(-G)		40	Ret		80	19	24			2
39=	(Germany) #952 Smyrlis Racing	CUP3	29	107	26	DNS	22	21	20	20	28	2
Entries ineligible for championship
-	(Germany) #9 GetSpeed Performance / Mercedes-AMG Team GetSpeed	SP9 Pro		Ret	9						2	-
-	(Switzerland) #26 Octane126	SP9 Pro				2						-
-	(Germany) #24 Dörr Motorsport	SP9 Pro					3	4^{2}	4	4	6^{3}	-
-	(Germany) #39 Audi Sport Team Land	SP9 Pro		8	3							-
-	(Germany) #33 Audi Sport Team Car Collection	SP9 Pro	4		13							-
-	(Germany) #20 Car Collection Motorsport	SP9 Pro-Am									5	-
-	(Germany) #15 Audi Sport Team Scherer PHX	SP9 Pro		7	10							-
-	(Germany) #103 Black Falcon Team Textar	CUP2				9	11	55	12	12	16	-
-	(Germany) #12 GetSpeed Performance	SP9 Pro		10	Ret							-
-	(Italy) #18 Dinamic GT	SP9 Pro	Ret	11							8	-
-	(Germany) #52 Haupt Racing Team	SP-X				11						-
-	(Germany) #104 PROsport-Racing	CUP2				18	Ret			13		-
-	(Germany) #37 PROsport-Racing	SP9 Pro	14								DNS	-
-	(Germany) #119 Clickversicherung Team	CUP2	Ret	37	60			22	16	16	19	-
-	(Germany) #347 (Porsche 991.2 GT3 Cup MR)	SP-Pro					18					-

Colour	Result
Gold	Winner
Silver	Second place
Bronze	Third place
Green	Points classification
Blue	Non-points classification
Blue	Non-classified finish (NC)
Purple	Retired, not classified (Ret)
Red	Did not qualify (DNQ)
Red	Did not pre-qualify (DNPQ)
Black	Disqualified (DSQ)
White	Did not start (DNS)
White	Withdrew (WD)
White	Race cancelled (C)
Blank	Did not practice (DNP)
Blank	Did not arrive (DNA)
Blank	Excluded (EX)

^{1} ^{2} ^{3}– Points-scoring position in qualifying

==== SP9 Pro ====
Pos.	Team	NLS1	NLS2	NLS3	NLS4	NLS5	NLS6	NLS7	NLS8	NLS9	Points
1	(Germany) #34 Walkenhorst Motorsport	Ret	1 (1)	Ret	1 (1)	Ret	1 (1)	1 (1)	1 (1)	4 (4)	194
2	(Germany) #3 Falken Motorsports	12 (12)	4 (4)	5 (5)		1 (1)	2 (2)			Ret	114
3	(Germany) #5 Scherer Sport PHX	Ret	49 (20)	7 (7)	4 (3)	Ret	Ret	Ret	3 (3)	1 (1)	102
4	(Germany) #35 Walkenhorst Motorsport	37 (15)	12 (12)	Ret	Ret	Ret	7 (6)	2 (2)	5 (5)	7 (6)	99
5	(Germany) #44 BMW Junior Team	5 (5)	3 (3)	1 (1)							80
6	(Germany) #11 Schnitzelalm Racing	3 (3)	15 (15)	Ret	Ret	2 (2)	5 (5)	Ret	DNS		79
7	(Germany) #4 Falken Motorsports	9 (9)	9 (9)	8 (8)		DSQ	3 (3)			17 (8)	77
8	(Germany) #99 ROWE Racing	1 (1)	Ret	2 (2)							63
9	(Germany) #21 Rutronik Racing	13 (13)	2 (2)	DSQ						3 (3)	61
10	(Germany) #30 Frikadelli Racing Team		Ret	6 (6)					2 (2)		46
11	(Germany) #98 ROWE Racing	Ret	6 (6)	4 (4)							40
12	(Germany) #911 Manthey EMA	7 (7)	5 (5)								36
13	(Germany) #16 Scherer Sport PHX	2 (2)	47 (19)	Ret							30
14	(Germany) #6 Haupt Racing Team	11 (11)	16 (16)							85 (9)	27
15	(Germany) #8 Mercedes-AMG Team Bilstein	6 (6)	14 (14)	Ret							25
16	(Germany) #27 Abt Sportsline	8 (8)	13 (13)								22
17	(Germany) #22 Wochenspiegel Team Monschau by Rinaldi Racing	10 (10)		11 (11)							21
18	(Germany) #7 Konrad Motorsport	Ret	17 (17)								4
19	(Germany) #25 Huber Motorsport		20 (18)								3
Entries ineligible for championship
-	(Germany) #9 GetSpeed Performance / Mercedes-AMG Team GetSpeed		Ret	9 (9)						2 (2)	-
-	(Switzerland) #26 Octane126				2 (2)						-
-	(Germany) #24 Dörr Motorsport					3 (3)	4 (4)	4 (3)	4 (4)	6 (5)	-
-	(Germany) #39 Audi Sport Team Land		8 (8)	3 (3)							-
-	(Germany) #33 Audi Sport Team Car Collection	4 (4)		13 (12)							-
-	(Germany) #15 Audi Sport Team Scherer PHX		7 (7)	10 (10)							-
-	(Italy) #18 Dinamic GT	Ret	11 (11)							8 (7)	-
-	(Germany) #12 GetSpeed Performance		10 (10)	Ret							-
-	(Germany) #37 PROsport-Racing	14 (14)								DNS	-
-	(Germany) #42 Lionspeed by Car Collection Motorsport			Ret							-

Colour	Result
Gold	Winner
Silver	Second place
Bronze	Third place
Green	Points classification
Blue	Non-points classification
Blue	Non-classified finish (NC)
Purple	Retired, not classified (Ret)
Red	Did not qualify (DNQ)
Red	Did not pre-qualify (DNPQ)
Black	Disqualified (DSQ)
White	Did not start (DNS)
White	Withdrew (WD)
White	Race cancelled (C)
Blank	Did not practice (DNP)
Blank	Did not arrive (DNA)
Blank	Excluded (EX)

(n) - Position in class

==== SP9 Pro-Am ====
Pos.	Team	NLS1	NLS2	NLS3	NLS4	NLS5	NLS6	NLS7	NLS8	NLS9	Points
1	(United States) #45 CP Racing	24 (3)	25 (1)	23 (4)	16 (3)		12 (3)	10 (2)	DNS	14 (3)	185
2	(Germany) #17 PROsport-Racing			14 (2)	3 (1)	4 (1)	Ret	3 (1)	Ret	9 (2)	161
3	(Germany) #25 Huber Motorsport	20 (1)		99 (5)	8 (2)		10 (2)	Ret			111
4	(Germany) #19 racing one		DNS	12 (1)		6 (2)	6 (1)	Ret	Ret		98
5	(Germany) #36 Walkenhorst Motorsport			22 (3)			Ret	Ret			25
Entries ineligible for championship
-	(Germany) #20 Car Collection Motorsport									5 (1)	-
-	(Germany) #30 Frikadelli Racing Team	21 (2)								Ret	-
-	(Germany) #22 Wochenspiegel Team Monschau by Rinaldi Racing		Ret								-
-	(Germany) #2 Schnitzelalm Racing		Ret								-

Colour	Result
Gold	Winner
Silver	Second place
Bronze	Third place
Green	Points classification
Blue	Non-points classification
Blue	Non-classified finish (NC)
Purple	Retired, not classified (Ret)
Red	Did not qualify (DNQ)
Red	Did not pre-qualify (DNPQ)
Black	Disqualified (DSQ)
White	Did not start (DNS)
White	Withdrew (WD)
White	Race cancelled (C)
Blank	Did not practice (DNP)
Blank	Did not arrive (DNA)
Blank	Excluded (EX)

(n) - Position in class

==== SP9 Am ====
Pos.	Team	NLS1	NLS2	NLS3	NLS4	NLS5	NLS6	NLS7	NLS8	NLS9	Points
1	(Germany) #50 équipe vitesse		35 (2)		14 (1)	12 (1)	13 (1)	9 (1)			168
2	(Germany) #17 PROsport-Racing	15‡ (1)	22 (1)								35

‡: Result not counted for classification

Colour	Result
Gold	Winner
Silver	Second place
Bronze	Third place
Green	Points classification
Blue	Non-points classification
Blue	Non-classified finish (NC)
Purple	Retired, not classified (Ret)
Red	Did not qualify (DNQ)
Red	Did not pre-qualify (DNPQ)
Black	Disqualified (DSQ)
White	Did not start (DNS)
White	Withdrew (WD)
White	Race cancelled (C)
Blank	Did not practice (DNP)
Blank	Did not arrive (DNA)
Blank	Excluded (EX)

(n) - Position in class

==== SP10 ====
Pos.	Team	NLS1	NLS2	NLS3	NLS4	NLS5	NLS6	NLS7	NLS8	NLS9	Points
1	(Germany) #187 FK Performance Motorsport	30 (1)	31 (1)	29 (2)	Ret	20 (1)	26 (1)	17 (1)	18 (1)	26 (1)	273
2	(Germany) #170 Toyo Tires with Ring Racing	34 (3)	Ret	32 (3)	23 (2)	31 (3)	Ret	22 (2)	22 (2)	71 (6)	177
3	(Germany) #191 Walkenhorst Motorsport	Ret	56 (5)	52 (9)	22 (1)	26 (2)			30 (3)		120
4	(Germany) #176 PROsport-racing	42‡ (6)	68 (6)		31 (4)		40 (3)	31 (4)	Ret	Ret	87
5	(Germany) #190 Teichmann Racing	41 (5)	70 (7)	Ret	24 (3)		Ret				61
6	(Hong Kong) #47 KCMG	Ret	48 (4)	28 (1)							57
7	(Germany) #180 Teichmann Racing	Ret	Ret	73 (10)					42 (4)	38 (5)	53
8	(Germany) #189 Haupt Racing Team	36 (4)	DSQ	35 (5)	Ret						42
9	(Germany) #177 Waldow Performance	32 (2)	Ret								28
Entries ineligible for championship
-	(Germany) #171 Toyo Tires with Ring Racing		45 (3)	37 (6)			30 (2)	27 (3)		33 (4)	-
-	(Germany) #175 PROsport-racing		34 (2)	47 (8)		33 (4)				32 (3)	-
-	(Germany) #178 FK Performance Motorsport			40 (7)						29 (2)	-
-	(Germany) #164 W&S Motorsport			33 (4)							-
-	(Romania) #193 (BMW M4 GT4)				76 (5)						-

‡: Result not counted for classification

Colour	Result
Gold	Winner
Silver	Second place
Bronze	Third place
Green	Points classification
Blue	Non-points classification
Blue	Non-classified finish (NC)
Purple	Retired, not classified (Ret)
Red	Did not qualify (DNQ)
Red	Did not pre-qualify (DNPQ)
Black	Disqualified (DSQ)
White	Did not start (DNS)
White	Withdrew (WD)
White	Race cancelled (C)
Blank	Did not practice (DNP)
Blank	Did not arrive (DNA)
Blank	Excluded (EX)

(n) - Position in class

==== SP7 ====
Pos.	Team	NLS1	NLS2	NLS3	NLS4	NLS5	NLS6	NLS7	NLS8	NLS9	Points
1	(Germany) #65 9und11 Racing				34 (1)						35
Entries ineligible for championship
-	(Germany) #63 PLUSLINE Racing Team	65 (1)	63 (1)	51 (1)	36 (2)	Ret	82 (2)	32 (1)	34 (3)	52 (3)	-
-	(Germany) #60 9und11 Racing					32 (1)	43 (1)	Ret		39 (2)	-
-	(Germany) #67 Teichmann Racing								25 (1)	27 (1)	-
-	(Germany) #974 KKrämer Racing	75 (2)									-
-	(Germany) #58 RPM Racing								32 (2)		-

Colour	Result
Gold	Winner
Silver	Second place
Bronze	Third place
Green	Points classification
Blue	Non-points classification
Blue	Non-classified finish (NC)
Purple	Retired, not classified (Ret)
Red	Did not qualify (DNQ)
Red	Did not pre-qualify (DNPQ)
Black	Disqualified (DSQ)
White	Did not start (DNS)
White	Withdrew (WD)
White	Race cancelled (C)
Blank	Did not practice (DNP)
Blank	Did not arrive (DNA)
Blank	Excluded (EX)

(n) - Position in class

==== SP4T ====
Pos.	Team	NLS1	NLS2	NLS3	NLS4	NLS5	NLS6	NLS7	NLS8	NLS9	Points
1	(Belgium) #266 HYRacing-AMC Sankt Vith	56 (1)	74 (1)	65 (1)	35 (1)	39 (1)	44 (2)	53 (2)	57 (2)		259
2	(Germany) #260 Smyrlis Racing	81 (2)	DNS	74 (2)	37 (2)	40 (2)	39 (1)	36 (1)	41 (1)	91 (1)	252
-	(Germany) #263 STI			Ret							-

Colour	Result
Gold	Winner
Silver	Second place
Bronze	Third place
Green	Points classification
Blue	Non-points classification
Blue	Non-classified finish (NC)
Purple	Retired, not classified (Ret)
Red	Did not qualify (DNQ)
Red	Did not pre-qualify (DNPQ)
Black	Disqualified (DSQ)
White	Did not start (DNS)
White	Withdrew (WD)
White	Race cancelled (C)
Blank	Did not practice (DNP)
Blank	Did not arrive (DNA)
Blank	Excluded (EX)

(n) - Position in class

==== SP3T ====
Pos.	Team	NLS1	NLS2	NLS3	NLS4	NLS5	NLS6	NLS7	NLS8	NLS9	Points
1	(Germany) #333 Schmickler Performance (powered by Ravenol)	38‡ (1)	39 (1)	48 (1)	25 (1)	27 (1)	34 (1)		29 (1)	Ret	210
2	(Germany) #10 Max Kruse Racing	87 (2)	Ret	Ret	29 (2)	30 (2)	Ret	46 (1)	33 (2)	53 (2)	175
Entries ineligible for championship
-	(Germany) #303 MSC Kempenich e.V. im ADAC asBest RACING					Ret	85 (2)		73 (3)	46 (1)	-
-	(Germany) #300 MSC Sinzig e.V. im ADAC			49 (2)							-
-	(Germany) #319 (SEAT León Cup Racer)					37 (3)					-

Colour	Result
Gold	Winner
Silver	Second place
Bronze	Third place
Green	Points classification
Blue	Non-points classification
Blue	Non-classified finish (NC)
Purple	Retired, not classified (Ret)
Red	Did not qualify (DNQ)
Red	Did not pre-qualify (DNPQ)
Black	Disqualified (DSQ)
White	Did not start (DNS)
White	Withdrew (WD)
White	Race cancelled (C)
Blank	Did not practice (DNP)
Blank	Did not arrive (DNA)
Blank	Excluded (EX)

(n) - Position in class

==== SP3 ====
Pos.	Team	NLS1	NLS2	NLS3	NLS4	NLS5	NLS6	NLS7	NLS8	NLS9	Points
1	(Hungary) #286 Car Competition Racing Team	63 (1)	91 (1)	90 (2)	55 (1)	DNQ	61 (1)	59 (1)			203
Entries ineligible for championship
-	(Germany) #270 MSC Adenau e.V. im ADAC		Ret	83 (1)	Ret	79 (1)	Ret				-
-	(Germany) #282 (Renault Clio 3 RS Cup)								76 (1)		-
-	(Armenia) #276 (Renault Clio 3 Cup)	Ret	96 (2)	91 (3)							-
-	(Germany) #281 (Dacia Logan)	90 (2)	109 (4)	Ret							-
-	(Japan) #284 Team HAL		98 (3)		Ret						-
-	(Germany) #273 (Toyota GT86)			105 (4)							-

Colour	Result
Gold	Winner
Silver	Second place
Bronze	Third place
Green	Points classification
Blue	Non-points classification
Blue	Non-classified finish (NC)
Purple	Retired, not classified (Ret)
Red	Did not qualify (DNQ)
Red	Did not pre-qualify (DNPQ)
Black	Disqualified (DSQ)
White	Did not start (DNS)
White	Withdrew (WD)
White	Race cancelled (C)
Blank	Did not practice (DNP)
Blank	Did not arrive (DNA)
Blank	Excluded (EX)

(n) - Position in class

==== AT(-G) ====
Pos.	Team	NLS1	NLS2	NLS3	NLS4	NLS5	NLS6	NLS7	NLS8	NLS9	Points
1	(Germany) #420 Four Motors Bioconcept-Car		41 (2)	44 (1)		38 (1)	36 (2)	NC	52 (1)	Ret	161
2	(Germany) #320 Four Motors Bioconcept-Car		40 (1)	Ret		80 (2)	19 (1)	24 (1)			133
3	(Germany) #633 Four Motors Bioconcept-Car		67 (3)	DNS		Ret	46 (3)	33 (3)			75
Entries ineligible for championship
-	(Germany) #636 (Subaru BRZ RR-AT)			Ret						97 (1)	-
-	(Germany) #635 Griesemann Gruppe by TR Team						62 (4)	30 (2)			-

Colour	Result
Gold	Winner
Silver	Second place
Bronze	Third place
Green	Points classification
Blue	Non-points classification
Blue	Non-classified finish (NC)
Purple	Retired, not classified (Ret)
Red	Did not qualify (DNQ)
Red	Did not pre-qualify (DNPQ)
Black	Disqualified (DSQ)
White	Did not start (DNS)
White	Withdrew (WD)
White	Race cancelled (C)
Blank	Did not practice (DNP)
Blank	Did not arrive (DNA)
Blank	Excluded (EX)

(n) - Position in class

==== TCR ====
Pos.	Team	NLS1	NLS2	NLS3	NLS4	NLS5	NLS6	NLS7	NLS8	NLS9	Points
1	(Norway) #801 Møller Bil Motorsport			43 (1)	26 (1)	35 (1)			27 (1)	37 (1)	175
2	(Germany) #808 MSC Kempenich e.V. im ADAC asBest RACING	58 (1)	85 (2)	NC	32 (3)	NC					88
3	(Germany) #807 Halder Motorsport	NC	Ret	64 (4)			NC	57 (1)	Ret		57
Entries ineligible for championship
-	(Germany) #800 MSC Emstal e.V. im ADAC						48 (1)			49 (2)	-
-	(Germany) #833 (Audi RS 3 LMS TCR)		46 (1)								-
-	(Italy) #811 (Cupra TCR)			45 (2)	27 (2)					95 (3)	-
-	(France) #802 (Opel Astra)			96 (5)		Ret			65 (2)		-
-	(Germany) #820 (Volkswagen Golf VII TCR)	61 (2)	Ret								-
-	(Germany) #827 JP Motorsport (Vortex Competition)						50 (2)				-
-	(Germany) #822 (Volkswagen Golf VII TCR)		105 (3)	Ret							-
-	(Germany) #821 (Audi RS 3 LMS TCR)			50 (3)							-

Colour	Result
Gold	Winner
Silver	Second place
Bronze	Third place
Green	Points classification
Blue	Non-points classification
Blue	Non-classified finish (NC)
Purple	Retired, not classified (Ret)
Red	Did not qualify (DNQ)
Red	Did not pre-qualify (DNPQ)
Black	Disqualified (DSQ)
White	Did not start (DNS)
White	Withdrew (WD)
White	Race cancelled (C)
Blank	Did not practice (DNP)
Blank	Did not arrive (DNA)
Blank	Excluded (EX)

(n) - Position in class

==== V6 ====
Pos.	Team	NLS1	NLS2	NLS3	NLS4	NLS5	NLS6	NLS7	NLS8	NLS9	Points
1	(Germany) #396 Adrenalin Motorsport Team Motec	47 (1)	62 (1)	55 (1)	43 (1)	44 (1)	72 (2)	37 (1)	54 (2)	42 (1)	301
Entries ineligible for championship
-	(Germany) #400 Schmickler Performance powered by Ravenol			66 (2)		62 (3)	47 (1)		50 (1)	50 (2)	-
-	(Germany) #410 MSC Adenau e.V. im ADAC	60 (2)	Ret		54 (2)	48 (2)			60 (3)	58 (3)	-
-	(Germany) #416 (Porsche 911)			101 (3)			Ret				-
-	(Germany) #418 SRS Team Sorg Rennsport			DNS							-

Colour	Result
Gold	Winner
Silver	Second place
Bronze	Third place
Green	Points classification
Blue	Non-points classification
Blue	Non-classified finish (NC)
Purple	Retired, not classified (Ret)
Red	Did not qualify (DNQ)
Red	Did not pre-qualify (DNPQ)
Black	Disqualified (DSQ)
White	Did not start (DNS)
White	Withdrew (WD)
White	Race cancelled (C)
Blank	Did not practice (DNP)
Blank	Did not arrive (DNA)
Blank	Excluded (EX)

(n) - Position in class

==== V5 ====
Pos.	Team	NLS1	NLS2	NLS3	NLS4	NLS5	NLS6	NLS7	NLS8	NLS9	Points
1	(Germany) #444 Adrenalin Motorsport Team Motec	76 (1)	77 (2)	104 (3)	Ret	51 (1)	58 (1)	51 (1)	DNS	63 (1)	228
Entries ineligible for championship
-	(Germany) #445 MSC Adenau e.V. im ADAC	85 (2)	101 (4)	95 (2)	64 (1)	65 (2)	78 (3)		64 (2)		-
-	(Germany) #440 QTQ-raceperformance		76 (1)	Ret		70 (3)					-
-	(Denmark) #456 Team Young KRS Danes		90 (3)	84 (1)							-
-	(Germany) #446 (Porsche Cayman)								58 (1)	Ret	-
-	(Germany) #450 W&S Motorsport								74 (3)	69 (2)	-
-	(United Kingdom) #448 (BMW E36 M3)					NC	70 (2)				-
-	(Germany) #447 (Porsche Cayman)		102 (5)								-

Colour	Result
Gold	Winner
Silver	Second place
Bronze	Third place
Green	Points classification
Blue	Non-points classification
Blue	Non-classified finish (NC)
Purple	Retired, not classified (Ret)
Red	Did not qualify (DNQ)
Red	Did not pre-qualify (DNPQ)
Black	Disqualified (DSQ)
White	Did not start (DNS)
White	Withdrew (WD)
White	Race cancelled (C)
Blank	Did not practice (DNP)
Blank	Did not arrive (DNA)
Blank	Excluded (EX)

(n) - Position in class

==== VT3 ====
Pos.	Team	NLS1	NLS2	NLS3	NLS4	NLS5	NLS6	NLS7	NLS8	NLS9	Points
1	(Germany) #474 Team Mathol Racing e.V.	52 (1)	60 (1)	53 (1)	46 (1)	54 (1)	Ret				175
Entries ineligible for championship
-	(Germany) #464 (Cupra Leon)								75 (1)		-
-	(Germany) #461 (BMW M2 N55)				53 (2)					61 (1)	-
-	(Germany) #460 (BMW M2 N55)						DNQ				-

Colour	Result
Gold	Winner
Silver	Second place
Bronze	Third place
Green	Points classification
Blue	Non-points classification
Blue	Non-classified finish (NC)
Purple	Retired, not classified (Ret)
Red	Did not qualify (DNQ)
Red	Did not pre-qualify (DNPQ)
Black	Disqualified (DSQ)
White	Did not start (DNS)
White	Withdrew (WD)
White	Race cancelled (C)
Blank	Did not practice (DNP)
Blank	Did not arrive (DNA)
Blank	Excluded (EX)

(n) - Position in class

==== VT2-FWD ====
Pos.	Team	NLS1	NLS2	NLS3	NLS4	NLS5	NLS6	NLS7	NLS8	NLS9	Points
1	(Germany) #491 Zierau Hochvolt by Mertens Motorsport	54 (1)	75 (3)	70 (2)	50 (2)	57 (3)	63 (2)	43 (1)	40 (1)	96 (8)	253
2	(Germany) #498 mathilda racing - Team LAVO Carwash	70 (3)	81 (6)	79 (5)	57 (5)	67 (5)	66 (3)	49 (3)	47 (3)	62 (2)	206
3	(Germany) #489 mathilda racing - Team LAVO Carwash	Ret	65 (1)	67 (1)	51 (3)	Ret	60 (1)	47 (2)	44 (2)	DNS	186
4	(Germany) #485 Hyundai Driving Experience	55‡ (2)	66 (2)	71 (3)	49 (1)	49 (1)	Ret				123
5	(Germany) #488 SRS Team Sorg Rennsport	Ret	83 (8)	85 (7)	Ret		74 (6)	54 (4)	DNS	99 (9)	82
6	(Germany) #466 Walkenhorst Motorsport	74 (5)	82 (7)	94 (10)	Ret	55 (2)	Ret	Ret			75
7	(Germany) #494 Jung Motorsport	Ret	Ret	Ret	Ret	Ret	NC	65 (7)			16
Entries ineligible for championship
-	(Germany) #470 Walkenhorst Motorsport		79 (5)		56 (4)	61 (4)	81 (7)	NC	66 (5)	60 (1)	-
-	(United Kingdom) #499 (Hyundai i30N)	73 (4)	84 (9)	82 (6)	66 (6)				53 (4)	64 (3)	-
-	(Germany) #486 Hyundai Driving Experience	83 (8)	78 (4)	86 (8)			69 (4)			81 (5)	-
-	(Germany) #487 Hyundai Driving Experience	77 (6)	87 (11)	77 (4)							-
-	(Germany) #475 Scuderia Solagon e.V.			88 (9)						80 (4)	-
-	(Germany) #490 Giti Tire Motorsport by WS Racing	79 (7)	86 (10)	98 (11)		72 (6)	73 (5)	61 (5)	70 (6)		-
-	(Germany) #481 (Renault Mégane)				71 (8)	73 (7)	86 (8)	63 (6)	71 (7)	89 (7)	-
-	(Germany) #467 MSC Kempenich e.V. im ADAC asBest Racing	89 (10)	100 (14)		70 (7)	78 (8)				86 (6)	-
-	(Germany) #468 Bulldog Racing	88 (9)	95 (13)								-
-	(Germany) #477 (Volkswagen Scirocco)	91 (11)		Ret	DNQ	NC	Ret		Ret		-
-	(Germany) #495 Jung Motorsport		93 (12)								-
-	(Germany) #484 MSC Adenau e.V. im ADAC	Ret	104 (15)								-
-	(Germany) #472 (Opel Astra)					Ret	Ret				-
-	(Germany) #479 mathilda racing - Team LAVO Carwash							Ret	Ret		-

‡: Result not counted for classification

Colour	Result
Gold	Winner
Silver	Second place
Bronze	Third place
Green	Points classification
Blue	Non-points classification
Blue	Non-classified finish (NC)
Purple	Retired, not classified (Ret)
Red	Did not qualify (DNQ)
Red	Did not pre-qualify (DNPQ)
Black	Disqualified (DSQ)
White	Did not start (DNS)
White	Withdrew (WD)
White	Race cancelled (C)
Blank	Did not practice (DNP)
Blank	Did not arrive (DNA)
Blank	Excluded (EX)

(n) - Position in class

==== VT2-R+4WD ====
Pos.	Team	NLS1	NLS2	NLS3	NLS4	NLS5	NLS6	NLS7	NLS8	NLS9	Points
1	(Germany) #1 Adrenalin Motorsport Team Motec	49 (1)	53 (1)	58 (1)	41 (1)	41 (1)	41 (1)	39 (1)	37 (1)	47 (1)	315
2	(Germany) #504 SRS Team Sorg Rennsport	68 (5)	61 (3)	63 (2)	Ret	50 (2)	54 (5)	41 (2)	46 (4)	66 (6)	189
3	(Germany) #514 SRS Team Sorg Rennsport	62 (4)	73 (5)	76 (4)	69 (7)	52 (3)	75 (8)	44 (3)	61 (6)	65 (5)	182
4	(Germany) #511 FK Performance Motorsport	50 (2)	55 (2)	Ret	42 (2)	Ret	42 (2)	Ret		54 (3)	137
5	(Germany) #501 Adrenalin Motorsport Team Motec	69 (6)	Ret	75 (3)	58 (3)	58 (6)	68 (7)	50 (6)	Ret	79 (11)	130
6	(Germany) #505 QTQ-Raceperformance	57 (3)	72 (4)	Ret	Ret	64 (7)	53 (4)	Ret		48 (2)	113
Entries ineligible for championship
-	(Germany) #524 SRS Team Sorg Rennsport		DNQ	Ret		56 (5)	67 (6)	45 (4)	38 (2)	88 (12)	-
-	(Germany) #516 Manheller Racing				60 (4)		52 (3)		56 (5)	67 (7)	-
-	(Germany) #503 Black Falcon Team Bilstein						Ret	48 (5)	45 (3)	57 (4)	-
-	(Germany) #508 MSC Adenau e.V. im ADAC				61 (5)	53 (4)	DNS		67 (7)	70 (8)	-
-	(Germany) #502 Giti Tire Motorsport by WS Racing		108 (8)	97 (5)		NC					-
-	(Germany) #520 Toyo Tires with Ring Racing	84 (9)	99 (6)	Ret	67 (6)	77 (8)		DNS			-
-	(Germany) #500 Giti Tire Motorsport by WS Racing	80 (8)	106 (7)				Ret	DNS	68 (8)	75 (9)	-
-	(Germany) #510 MSG Bayerischer Wald Hutthurm e.V. im ADAC	72 (7)								Ret	-
-	(Japan) #515 Team HAL									76 (10)	-
-	(Belgium) #515 (BMW 125i)		Ret								-
-	(Japan) #519 Team HAL						Ret				-
-	(Germany) #519 Toyo Tires with Ring Racing								Ret		-

Colour	Result
Gold	Winner
Silver	Second place
Bronze	Third place
Green	Points classification
Blue	Non-points classification
Blue	Non-classified finish (NC)
Purple	Retired, not classified (Ret)
Red	Did not qualify (DNQ)
Red	Did not pre-qualify (DNPQ)
Black	Disqualified (DSQ)
White	Did not start (DNS)
White	Withdrew (WD)
White	Race cancelled (C)
Blank	Did not practice (DNP)
Blank	Did not arrive (DNA)
Blank	Excluded (EX)

(n) - Position in class

==== Porsche Endurance Trophy Nürburgring CUP2 ====
Pos.	Team	NLS1	NLS2	NLS3	NLS4	NLS5	NLS6	NLS7	NLS8	NLS9	Points
1	(Germany) #121 KKrämer Racing	Ret	18 (1)	15 (1)	7 (3)	9 (4)	9 (2)	6 (2)	**6 (1)**	**12 (3)**	151.5 (166.5)
2	(Germany) #100 Max Kruse Racing	18 (3)	21 (3)	17 (3)	6 (2)	5 (1)	8 (1)	5 (1)	DSQ	15 (5)	137 (163)
3	(Germany) #102 Black Falcon Team Identica	Ret	19 (2)	18 (4)	10 (5)	7 (2)	11 (3)	7 (3)	8 (3)	10 (1)	135.5 (146.5)
4	(Germany) #107 Team Mathol Racing e.V.	19 (4)	**Ret**	19 (5)	5 (1)	8 (3)	**16 (6)**	8 (4)	9 (4)	11 (2)	121 (133)
5	(Germany) #111 Frikadelli Racing Team	**25 (7)**	28 (6)	**21 (7)**	12 (6)	**13 (7)**	17 (7)	13 (7)			81.5
6	(Belgium) #124 Mühlner Motorsport	66 (9)	23 (4)	20 (6)	13 (7)	14 (8)	14 (4)		10 (5)	Ret	81.5
7	(Germany) #120 AVIA W&S Motorsport	16 (1)	Ret	16 (2)	**15 (8)**	Ret			7 (2)	13 (4)	78
8	(Belgium) #123 Mühlner Motorsport	17 (2)	DSQ	78 (13)	Ret	10 (5)		**11 (5)**	11 (6)	20 (9)	72
9	(Germany) #112 KKrämer Racing	22 (5)	30 (7)	25 (9)	17 (9)	15 (9)	18 (8)	14 (8)	Ret	18 (7)	70.5 (77.5)
10	(Germany) #105 ADAC Sachsen e.V. / Fugel Sport	40 (8)	24 (5)	24 (8)	Ret	16 (10)	15 (5)	15 (9)	14 (9)	DNS	70
11	(Germany) #103 Black Falcon Team Textar				9 (4)	11 (6)	55 (12)	12 (6)	12 (7)	16 (6)	69
12	(Germany) #119 Clickversicherung Team	Ret	37 (8)	60 (12)			22 (9)	16 (10)	16 (10)	19 (8)	45.5
13	(Germany) #113 Team Bill Cameron		54 (9)	36 (10)	Ret	23 (12)	31 (11)	19 (11)			34
14	(Germany) #106 PB-Performance			46 (11)		17 (11)	24 (10)	Ret	28 (11)	25 (10)	32.5
15	(Germany) #127 Max Kruse Racing	23 (6)					57 (13)	Ret			14.5
16	(Germany) #104 PROsport-Racing				18 (10)	Ret			13 (8)		14
Entries ineligible for championship
-	(Germany) #125 Huber Motorsport	26 (8)				25 (13)			15 (10)	24 (10)	-
-	(Germany) #101 RPM Racing			31 (10)						Ret	-
-	(Germany) #129 (Holzer & Evans)			Ret							-

Colour	Result
Gold	Winner
Silver	Second place
Bronze	Third place
Green	Points classification
Blue	Non-points classification
Blue	Non-classified finish (NC)
Purple	Retired, not classified (Ret)
Red	Did not qualify (DNQ)
Red	Did not pre-qualify (DNPQ)
Black	Disqualified (DSQ)
White	Did not start (DNS)
White	Withdrew (WD)
White	Race cancelled (C)
Blank	Did not practice (DNP)
Blank	Did not arrive (DNA)
Blank	Excluded (EX)

**Bold** - Pole position

Italics - Fastest lap

(n) - Position in class

==== Porsche Endurance Trophy Nürburgring CUP3 ====
Pos.	Team	NLS1	NLS2	NLS3	NLS4	NLS5	NLS6	NLS7	NLS8	NLS9	Points
1	(Germany) #959 SRS Team Sorg Rennsport	27 (1)	27 (2)	27 (2)	**19 (1)**	**19 (1)**	**20 (1)**	18 (1)	17 (1)	23 (2)	172 (207)
2	(Germany) #952 Smyrlis Racing	29 (3)	107 (11)	26 (1)	DNS	22 (3)	21 (2)	20 (2)	20 (3)	28 (3)	138.5 (143.5)
3	(Germany) #960 AVIA W&S Motorsport	**28 (2)**	26 (1)	**Ret**	28 (4)	21 (2)	38 (10)	**26 (5)**	Ret	Ret	109
4	(Germany) #949 SRS Team Sorg Rennsport	Ret	32 (4)	38 (5)	21 (3)	28 (5)	25 (3)	28 (6)	**21 (4)**	36 (8)	108 (116)
5	(Germany) #950 Schmickler Performance (powered by Ravenol)	Ret	42 (8)	30 (3)	20 (2)	24 (4)	29 (6)	Ret	19 (2)	31 (5)	102.5
6	(Germany) #944 Team Oehme	35 (6)	38 (7)	41 (7)	Ret	34 (7)	28 (5)	23 (3)	23 (5)	30 (4)	95.5 (104.5)
7	(Germany) #930 Adrenalin Motorsport Team Motec	33 (5)	33 (5)	34 (4)	Ret	29 (6)	32 (7)	25 (4)	26 (7)	**35 (7)**	93 (102)
8	(Germany) #962 W&S Motorsport GmbH	31 (4)	29 (3)	DNS	74 (7)	DNS	27 (4)	Ret	31 (8)	22 (1)	84.5
9	(Germany) #955 Team Mathol Racing e.V.	39 (7)	36 (6)	59 (9)	75 (8)	Ret	35 (8)	29 (7)	24 (6)	34 (6)	72.5 (79.5)
10	(Germany) #931 Black Falcon Team Textar	64 (9)	**43 (9)**	39 (6)	33 (6)	Ret	51 (11)	40 (8)		Ret	54.5
11	(Germany) #961 W&S Motorsport GmbH	43 (8)	52 (10)	42 (8)	30 (5)	Ret	37 (9)	Ret		90 (9)	50.5
Entries ineligible for championship
-	(Germany) #932 Black Falcon Team Textar	51 (9)	69 (10)	72 (10)		47 (8)	33 (8)			Ret	-
-	(Germany) #969 SRS Team Sorg Rennsport					66 (9)	Ret	42 (9)	62 (9)	87 (11)	-
-	(Germany) #954 Team Mathol Racing e.V.									43 (9)	-
-	(Germany) #980 Black Falcon Team Textar									55 (10)	-
-	(Germany) #963 Huber Racing	67 (11)									-
-	(Germany) #977 KKrämer Racing	Ret	112 (13)	Ret							-
-	(Germany) #951 Schmickler Performance (powered by Ravenol)						56 (13)	Ret			-
-	(Germany) #979 Lionspeed GP						DNS	Ret			-
-	(New Zealand) #933 (Dalton, Woolford & Breakell)			Ret							-

Colour	Result
Gold	Winner
Silver	Second place
Bronze	Third place
Green	Points classification
Blue	Non-points classification
Blue	Non-classified finish (NC)
Purple	Retired, not classified (Ret)
Red	Did not qualify (DNQ)
Red	Did not pre-qualify (DNPQ)
Black	Disqualified (DSQ)
White	Did not start (DNS)
White	Withdrew (WD)
White	Race cancelled (C)
Blank	Did not practice (DNP)
Blank	Did not arrive (DNA)
Blank	Excluded (EX)

**Bold** - Pole position

Italics - Fastest lap

(n) - Position in class

==== BMW M240i Cup ====
Pos.	Team	NLS1	NLS2	NLS3	NLS4	NLS5	NLS6	NLS7	NLS8	NLS9	Points
1	(Germany) #650 Adrenalin Motorsport Team Motec	46 (1)	50 (1)	54 (1)	38 (1)	36 (1)	Ret	DNS	36 (1)	40 (1)	245
2	(Germany) #651 Adrenalin Motorsport Team Motec	59 (4)	71 (5)	68 (5)	47 (3)	Ret	49 (2)	35 (2)	39 (2)	44 (3)	196
3	(Germany) #666 Schnitzelalm Racing	48 (2)	58 (2)	57 (3)	Ret	Ret	Ret	34 (1)	77 (6)	41 (2)	162
4	(Germany) #652 Adrenalin Motorsport Team Motec	71 (5)	80 (6)	81 (6)	59 (5)	Ret	71 (4)	52 (4)	51 (3)	Ret	145
5	(Germany) #660 Smyrlis Racing	53 (3)	64 (4)	56 (2)	40 (2)	59 (3)	Ret		Ret		128
6	(Germany) #653 Team mcchip-dkr	Ret	89 (7)	87 (7)	52 (4)	46 (2)	Ret	Ret	55 (4)	74 (8)	118
7	(Germany) #691 Eifelkind Racing / MSC SINZIG e.V. im ADAC	DNS		62‡ (4)	Ret	Ret	Ret			68 (7)	16
Entries ineligible for championship
-	(Germany) #665 Schnitzelalm Racing	Ret				76 (5)	45 (1)	38 (3)	59 (5)	59 (6)	-
-	(Germany) #655 Adrenalin Motorsport Team Motec					60 (4)	59 (3)	Ret	Ret	DNS	-
-	(Germany) #674 Schnitzelalm Racing	82 (6)	59 (3)							56 (5)	-
-	(Germany) #680 Up2Race									51 (4)	-
-	(Germany) #662 Smyrlis Racing						83 (5)	58 (5)			-
-	(Germany) #661 Smyrlis Racing				Ret	Ret					-

‡: Result not counted for classification

Colour	Result
Gold	Winner
Silver	Second place
Bronze	Third place
Green	Points classification
Blue	Non-points classification
Blue	Non-classified finish (NC)
Purple	Retired, not classified (Ret)
Red	Did not qualify (DNQ)
Red	Did not pre-qualify (DNPQ)
Black	Disqualified (DSQ)
White	Did not start (DNS)
White	Withdrew (WD)
White	Race cancelled (C)
Blank	Did not practice (DNP)
Blank	Did not arrive (DNA)
Blank	Excluded (EX)

(n) - Position in class

== See also ==
- 2023 24 Hours of Nürburgring

== Bibliography ==
- Tim Upietz & Patrik Koziolek (21 December 2023). Nürburgring Langstrecken-Serie 2023. Gruppe C Motorsport Verlag. ISBN 978-3-948501-25-9.
