= Joe Ghanem =

Lebanese racing driver

- Nationality: Lebanese
- Born: 8 May 1990 (age 36) Falougha (Lebanon)

Previous series
- 2012 2012 2012 2012 2011 2009 2007 2007 2007 2006: Formula Renault BARC; Formula Renault BARC Winter Series; Formula Gulf 1000; Maserati Trofeo Middle East; UAE GT-C Championship; British Formula 3 (National); Formula Renault UK Winter Series; Formula Renault 2.0 Eurocup; Thunder Arabia Middle Eastern Series

Championship titles
- 2012 2012 2011: Formula Gulf 1000; Maserati Trofeo Middle East; UAE GT-C Championship

Joe Ghanem (born May 8, 1990 in Falougha, Lebanon) is a Lebanese racing driver and son of 1980's Lebanese Rally Champion Samir Ghanem.

Ghanem became the first Lebanese to stand on a podium in a single seater race in Europe when he finished secpnd place in the 2009 Cooper Tires British Formula 3 International Series - National Class with Carlin Motorsport. He also is the first Lebanese to win a GT championship when he won the 2010-2011 UAE GT Championship (GTC).

Ghanem is also a rally driver with several podium finishes in local and regional rallies.

== Career ==
=== Karting ===
Currently, Ghanem works for BRN Racing Karting Team as a performance coach. Additionally, he began his career in Karting; In 2004, he won the Lebanese Junior Championship Formula A.

=== Formula Racing ===
Ghanem started his Formula Racing career in 2006, finishing third overall in the Bahrain based Thunder Arabia Middle Eastern Series with one pole position and six podiums. In 2007, and as part of the A1 Team Lebanon Driver Development Program, he competed in eight races in the Eurocup Formula Renault 2.0 and in the Formula Renault 2.0 UK - Winter Series both with Carlin Motorsport. In 2008, due to lack of funding, he did not compete in Europe and returned in 2009 again with Carlin Motorsport, this time contesting the last two rounds of the British Formula Three – National Class, and finishing on the podium in three of the four races.

In 2011, Ghanem competed in the UAE based Formula Gulf 1000 with eight wins, five pole positions, 12 podiums and two fastest laps. In 2012 and 2013, he competed in the Formula Renault 2.0 BARC Championship with Mtech Lite; his best result came in Croft, when he finished in third position.

=== GT Racing ===
In 2010, Ghanem moved to the Middle East racing scene where he competed in the UAT GT Championship|UAE GT Championship – GTC Class with Gulf Sport Racing driving a Ginetta G50 and winning the Championship with one win, one pole position and five podiums. In 2011, Ghanem continued his championship winning streak by winning the Trofeo Maserati – Middle East with six wins, seven pole positions and eight podiums. He also contested the first round of the Trofeo Maserati – European Series scoring a pole position, one fastest lap and finishing on the podium in all three races.

=== Rallying and Hill Climb ===
In 2008, Ghanem took part in the ninth International Hill Climb Event that took place in Syria and won his Group category (Group N). In 2010, he finished third overall in the 19th Rally of Cedars in Lebanon, fifth overall in the second National Rally in Jordan and third overall in the first National Rally in Jordan.

== Racing record ==
=== Racing career summary ===
Season	Series	Team name	Races	Wins	Poles	F/Laps	Podiums	Points	Position
2006	Thunder Arabia Middle Eastern Series	Thunder Arabia	14	0	1	–	6	153	**3rd**
2007	Eurocup Formula Renault 2.0	Carlin Motorsport	8	0	0	0	0	–	–
2007	Formula Renault 2.0 UK - Winter Series	Carlin Motorsport	4	0	0	0	0	–	–
2009	British Formula Three - National Class	Carlin Motorsport	4	0	0	0	3	39	5th
2010–11	UAE GT Championship - GTC Class	Gulf Sport Racing	8	1	1	0	5	50	**1st**
2011–12	Trofeo Maserati - Middle East	Leisure Racing	12	6	7	0	8	214	**1st**
2011–12	Formula Gulf 1000	Orient Racing	14	8	5	2	12	100	**1st**
2012	Trofeo Maserati - European Series	Leisure Racing	3	0	1	1	03	43	16th
2012	Formula Renault 2.0 BARC Championship	Mtech Lite	11	0	0	0	0	36	23rd
2012	Formula Renault 2.0 BARC Winter Series	Mtech Lite	4	0	0	0	0	30	13th
2013	Formula Renault 2.0 UK Championship	Mtech Lite	14	0	0	0	1	166	7th

=== Complete Eurocup Formula Renault 2.0 results ===
(key) (Races in bold indicate pole position; races in italics indicate fastest lap)

Year	Entrant	1	2	3	4	5	6	7	8	9	10	11	12	13	14	DC	Points
2007	Carlin Motorsport	ZOL; 1; 27	ZOL; 2; 30	NÜR; 1; 26	NÜR; 2; 24	HUN; 1; 22	HUN; 2 Ret	DON; 1 Ret	DON; 2; 22	MAG; 1	MAG; 2	EST; 1	EST; 2	CAT; 1	CAT; 2	42nd	0
