= 2013 Protyre Formula Renault Championship =

Motor racing competition

Seasons
- ← 2012 2014 →

The 2013 Protyre Formula Renault Championship was a multi-event motor racing championship for open wheel, formula racing cars held across England. The championship features a mix of professional motor racing teams and privately funded drivers competing in 2 litre Formula Renault single seat race cars that conform to the technical regulations for the championship. The 2013 season was the 19th British Formula Renault Championship organized by the British Automobile Racing Club and the second season as the premier Formula Renault 2.0 championship in the United Kingdom. The season began at Donington Park on 14 April and ended on 29 September at Silverstone Circuit. The series will form part of the BARC club racing meetings and expand from fourteen to sixteen rounds at six events all held in England, with four triple header events.

The series has undergone rebranding after the BARC Championship became the prominent Formula Renault Championship in the United Kingdom. The series took the name Protyre Formula Renault Championship, dropping the BARC tag after its growth into one of the leading national single seater championships in Great Britain.

== Teams and drivers ==
All teams were British-registered.

2013 Entry List
| Team | No. | Driver name | Rounds |
|---|---|---|---|
| Mtech Lite | 2 | (United Kingdom) Alex Gill | 6 |
| Mtech Lite | 7 | (Lebanon) Joe Ghanem | 1–5 |
| Mtech Lite | 13 | (Lebanon) Shahan Sarkissian | All |
| Mtech Lite | 37 | (Argentina) Matias Galetto | 1–5 |
| Mtech Lite | 88 | (United Kingdom) Edward Brand | 1–5 |
| Scorpio Motorsport | 3 | (Brazil) Henrique Baptista | 2–6 |
| Scorpio Motorsport | 5 | (Russia) Ivan Taranov | 1–3, 6 |
| Scorpio Motorsport | 9 | (United Kingdom) Piers Hickin | 6 |
| Jamun Racing Services | 4 | (Mexico) Diego Menchaca | 1–3, 5 |
| Jamun Racing Services | 77 | (Brazil) Pietro Fittipaldi | All |
| Fortec Motorsports | 6 | (Malaysia) Weiron Tan | All |
| Fortec Motorsports | 8 | (China) Cao Hongwei | All |
| Fortec Motorsports | 11 | (Hong Kong) Shaun Thong | All |
| Fortec Motorsports | 50 | (United Kingdom) Sam MacLeod | All |
| Core Motorsport | 9 | (United Kingdom) Piers Hickin | 2–4 |
| Core Motorsport | 22 | (United Kingdom) Ashley Crossey | 6 |
| Hillspeed | 10 | (United Kingdom) Matthew Rao | All |
| Hillspeed | 25 | (United Kingdom) Jake Cook | All |
| MGR Motorsport | 14 | (United Kingdom) Tom Oliphant | 1–5 |
| MGR Motorsport | 15 | (Italy) Matteo Ferrer | All |
| MGR Motorsport | 16 | (United Kingdom) Chris Middlehurst | All |
| MGR Motorsport | 17 | (Mexico) Jorge Cevallos | All |
| Fortec Competition | 21 | (China) Leo Ye | 5–6 |
| Cliff Dempsey Racing | 23 | (Finland) Jesse Antilla | 4–5 |
| SWB Motorsport | 27 | (Finland) Atte Lehtonen | 2, 4–6 |

== Race calendar ==
The series formed part of the BARC club racing meetings and expanded to sixteen rounds at six events, with four triple header events. A championship calendar was released on 14 December 2012, with the final round once again in support of the 2013 British Touring Car Championship. All rounds will held in England.

| Round | | Circuit | Date | Pole position | Fastest lap | Winning driver | Winning team |
|---|---|---|---|---|---|---|---|
| 1 | R1 | Donington Park (National Circuit, Leicestershire) | 14 April | (United Kingdom) Sam MacLeod | (United Kingdom) Chris Middlehurst | (United Kingdom) Chris Middlehurst | MGR Motorsport |
| 1 | R2 | Donington Park (National Circuit, Leicestershire) | 14 April | (United Kingdom) Sam MacLeod | (Russia) Ivan Taranov | (Mexico) Jorge Cevallos | MGR Motorsport |
| 2 | R3 | Snetterton Motor Racing Circuit (200 Circuit, Norfolk) | 11 May | (United Kingdom) Chris Middlehurst | (United Kingdom) Chris Middlehurst | (United Kingdom) Chris Middlehurst | MGR Motorsport |
| 2 | R4 | Snetterton Motor Racing Circuit (200 Circuit, Norfolk) | 12 May | (Malaysia) Weiron Tan | (United Kingdom) Chris Middlehurst | (United Kingdom) Sam MacLeod | Fortec Motorsports |
| 2 | R5 | Snetterton Motor Racing Circuit (200 Circuit, Norfolk) | 12 May | (Malaysia) Weiron Tan | (Malaysia) Weiron Tan | (United Kingdom) Chris Middlehurst | MGR Motorsport |
| 3 | R6 | Thruxton Circuit (Hampshire) | 1 June | (United Kingdom) Chris Middlehurst | (United Kingdom) Chris Middlehurst | (United Kingdom) Chris Middlehurst | MGR Motorsport |
| 3 | R7 | Thruxton Circuit (Hampshire) | 2 June | (United Kingdom) Chris Middlehurst | (United Kingdom) Chris Middlehurst | (United Kingdom) Chris Middlehurst | MGR Motorsport |
| 3 | R8 | Thruxton Circuit (Hampshire) | 2 June | (United Kingdom) Chris Middlehurst | (Malaysia) Weiron Tan | (United Kingdom) Chris Middlehurst | MGR Motorsport |
| 4 | R9 | Croft Circuit (North Yorkshire) | 6 July | (China) Cao Hongwei | (Malaysia) Weiron Tan | (Malaysia) Weiron Tan | Fortec Motorsports |
| 4 | R10 | Croft Circuit (North Yorkshire) | 7 July | (Malaysia) Weiron Tan | (United Kingdom) Sam MacLeod | (Malaysia) Weiron Tan | Fortec Motorsports |
| 4 | R11 | Croft Circuit (North Yorkshire) | 7 July | (China) Cao Hongwei | (Malaysia) Weiron Tan | (Malaysia) Weiron Tan | Fortec Motorsports |
| 5 | R12 | Rockingham Motor Speedway (International Super Sports Car Circuit, Northamptonshire) | 10 August | (Malaysia) Weiron Tan | (Malaysia) Weiron Tan | (Malaysia) Weiron Tan | Fortec Motorsports |
| 5 | R13 | Rockingham Motor Speedway (International Super Sports Car Circuit, Northamptonshire) | 11 August | (Malaysia) Weiron Tan | (Malaysia) Weiron Tan | (Malaysia) Weiron Tan | Fortec Motorsports |
| 5 | R14 | Rockingham Motor Speedway (International Super Sports Car Circuit, Northamptonshire) | 11 August | (Malaysia) Weiron Tan | (Italy) Matteo Ferrer | (China) Cao Hongwei | Fortec Motorsports |
| 6 | R15 | Silverstone Circuit (National Circuit, Northamptonshire) | 28 September | (Russia) Ivan Taranov | (United Kingdom) Jake Cook | (Russia) Ivan Taranov | Scorpio Motorsport |
| 6 | R16 | Silverstone Circuit (National Circuit, Northamptonshire) | 29 September | (Hong Kong) Shaun Thong | (Hong Kong) Shaun Thong | (Russia) Ivan Taranov | Scorpio Motorsport |

== Championship standings ==
A driver's best 15 scores counted towards the championship, with any other points being discarded.

| Pos | Driver | DON | | SNE | | | THR | | | CRO | | | ROC | | | SIL | | Points |
|---|---|---|---|---|---|---|---|---|---|---|---|---|---|---|---|---|---|---|
| 1 | (United Kingdom) Chris Middlehurst | 1 | 2 | 1 | 2 | 1 | 1 | 1 | 1 | 3 | 7 | 2 | 2 | 3 | 2 | Ret | Ret | 408 |
| 2 | (Malaysia) Weiron Tan | 3 | Ret | 7 | Ret | 5 | 13 | 2 | 2 | 1 | 1 | 1 | 1 | 1 | Ret | 3 | 12 | 331 |
| 3 | (Mexico) Jorge Cevallos | 11 | 1 | 6 | 6 | 4 | 3 | Ret | 7 | 6 | 3 | 4 | 6 | 7 | 3 | 5 | 4 | 307 |
| 4 | (China) Cao Hongwei | 7 | 6 | 11 | 13 | Ret | 2 | 8 | 5 | 2 | 4 | 15 | 3 | 4 | 1 | 4 | 3 | 296 |
| 5 | (United Kingdom) Jake Cook | 12 | 4 | 2 | 3 | 2 | Ret | 3 | 3 | 4 | 5 | 6 | 4 | 6 | Ret | 2 | Ret | 292 |
| 6 | (United Kingdom) Sam MacLeod | 2 | 13 | 18 | 1 | Ret | Ret | 9 | Ret | Ret | 2 | Ret | Ret | 2 | Ret | Ret | 2 | 169 |
| 7 | (Lebanon) Joe Ghanem | 4 | 5 | 5 | 7 | Ret | Ret | 4 | Ret | 9 | Ret | 3 | Ret | 14 | 4 | | | 166 |
| 8 | (Brazil) Pietro Fittipaldi | Ret | 9 | 17 | 5 | Ret | 6 | 12 | Ret | 7 | Ret | 16 | 7 | 12 | 6 | 6 | 6 | 163 |
| 9 | (Brazil) Henrique Baptista | | | Ret | 4 | 8 | 4 | 6 | 6 | 11 | 6 | 5 | 15 | 11 | Ret | Ret | Ret | 158 |
| 10 | (Lebanon) Shahan Sarkissian | 9 | 11 | 12 | 12 | Ret | 11 | 10 | 10 | 10 | Ret | 13 | 12 | 15 | 9 | 8 | 8 | 146 |
| 11 | (Argentina) Matias Galetto | 6 | Ret | 3 | Ret | 9 | 5 | Ret | 4 | Ret | 11 | 8 | 5 | Ret | Ret | | | 141 |
| 12 | (Russia) Ivan Taranov | Ret | 3 | 4 | 14 | DSQ | Ret | 5 | DSQ | | | | | | | 1 | 1 | 140 |
| 13 | (United Kingdom) Tom Oliphant | Ret | 10 | 8 | 8 | Ret | 12 | 11 | 9 | 12 | Ret | 7 | 9 | 9 | 7 | | | 135 |
| 14 | (Italy) Matteo Ferrer | 5 | 7 | 9 | 16 | 6 | DNS | DNS | DNS | 15 | 9 | 10 | Ret | Ret | 5 | 10 | Ret | 133 |
| 15 | (United Kingdom) Matt Rao | 8 | 8 | 14 | 17 | 3 | 9 | 7 | DNS | 8 | Ret | Ret | 10 | 10 | Ret | Ret | DNS | 128 |
| 16 | (Hong Kong) Shaun Thong | Ret | DNS | 13 | 9 | 10 | Ret | Ret | Ret | 5 | 14 | Ret | 11 | 5 | Ret | 14 | 5 | 117 |
| 17 | (United Kingdom) Ed Brand | 10 | 12 | 10 | Ret | 7 | 10 | Ret | DNS | 13 | 7 | 9 | 13 | Ret | Ret | | | 100 |
| 18 | (Mexico) Diego Menchaca | Ret | DNS | 16 | 10 | 11 | 7 | Ret | 8 | | | | Ret | 13 | 8 | | | 78 |
| 19 | (United Kingdom) Piers Hickin | | | 15 | 11 | DSQ | 8 | Ret | Ret | Ret | 12 | 12 | | | | 7 | 11 | 74 |
| 20 | (Finland) Atte Lehtonen | | | 19 | 15 | Ret | | | | 16 | 13 | 14 | 14 | 16 | 10 | 12 | 10 | 71 |
| 21 | (China) Leo Ye | | | | | | | | | | | | 8 | 8 | Ret | 11 | Ret | 38 |
| 22 | (Finland) Jesse Anttila | | | | | | | | | 14 | 10 | 11 | DNS | DNS | DNS | | | 28 |
| 23 | (United Kingdom) Ashley Crossey | | | | | | | | | | | | | | | 9 | 7 | 28 |
| 24 | (United Kingdom) Alex Gill | | | | | | | | | | | | | | | 13 | 9 | 20 |
| Pos | Driver | DON | | SNE | | | THR | | | CRO | | | ROC | | | SIL | | Points |

| Colour | Result |
|---|---|
| Gold | Winner |
| Silver | Second place |
| Bronze | Third place |
| Green | Points classification |
| Blue | Non-points classification |
| Blue | Non-classified finish (NC) |
| Purple | Retired, not classified (Ret) |
| Red | Did not qualify (DNQ) |
| Red | Did not pre-qualify (DNPQ) |
| Black | Disqualified (DSQ) |
| White | Did not start (DNS) |
| White | Withdrew (WD) |
| White | Race cancelled (C) |
| Blank | Did not practice (DNP) |
| Blank | Did not arrive (DNA) |
| Blank | Excluded (EX) |

== Protyre Formula Renault Autumn Cup ==
The 2013 Protyre Formula Renault Autumn Cup was the 16th British Formula Renault Winter Series and the second all BARC championship only winter series. The series was held at Rockingham Motor Speedway on 16 and 17 November. The meeting took place with a two-day format with one qualifying and two races held each day, creating a four race championship.

=== Teams and drivers ===
| Team | No. | Driver |
|---|---|---|
| MGR Motorsport | 2 | (United Kingdom) Alex Gill |
| Fortec Motorsports | 7 | (Croatia) Martin Kodric |
| Fortec Motorsports | 8 | (China) Cao Hongwei |
| Fortec Motorsports | 9 | (Japan) Yosuke Yamazaki |
| Fortec Motorsports | 14 | (United Kingdom) Ben Barnicoat |
| Jamun Racing Services | 77 | (Brazil) Pietro Fittipaldi |

=== Race calendar and results ===
The calendar was announced by the championship organisers on 2 September 2013, with all rounds held at Rockingham Motor Speedway in England.

| Circuit | Date | Race | Pole position | Fastest lap | Winning driver | Winning team |
|---|---|---|---|---|---|---|
| Rockingham Motor Speedway (International Super Sports Car Circuit, Northamptonshire) | 16 November | R1 | (United Kingdom) Ben Barnicoat | (United Kingdom) Ben Barnicoat | (United Kingdom) Ben Barnicoat | Fortec Motorsports |
| Rockingham Motor Speedway (International Super Sports Car Circuit, Northamptonshire) | 16 November | R2 | (United Kingdom) Ben Barnicoat | (United Kingdom) Ben Barnicoat | (China) Cao Hongwei | Fortec Motorsports |
| Rockingham Motor Speedway (International Super Sports Car Circuit, Northamptonshire) | 16 November | R3 | (United Kingdom) Ben Barnicoat | (Croatia) Martin Kodric | (United Kingdom) Ben Barnicoat | Fortec Motorsports |

=== Championship standings ===
| Pos | Driver | ROC | | | Points |
|---|---|---|---|---|---|
| 1 | (United Kingdom) Ben Barnicoat | 1 | 2 | 1 | 96 |
| 2 | (China) Cao Hongwei | 3 | 1 | 4 | 79 |
| 3 | (Croatia) Martin Kodric | 4 | 4 | 2 | 74 |
| 4 | (United Kingdom) Alex Gill | 2 | 3 | 5 | 73 |
| 5 | (Japan) Yosuke Yamazaki | 5 | 6 | 6 | 56 |
| 6 | (Brazil) Pietro Fittipaldi | NC | 5 | 3 | 45 |
| Pos | Driver | ROC | | | Points |
