= Trofeo =

Trofeo (Italian and Spanish for trophy) may refer to:

- Trofeo Maserati, a one-make racing series
- Maserati Trofeo, a type of car raced in the series mentioned above
- Oldsmobile Troféo, a variant of the fourth generation Oldsmobile Toronado
