= Jorge Cevallos =

Mexican racing driver

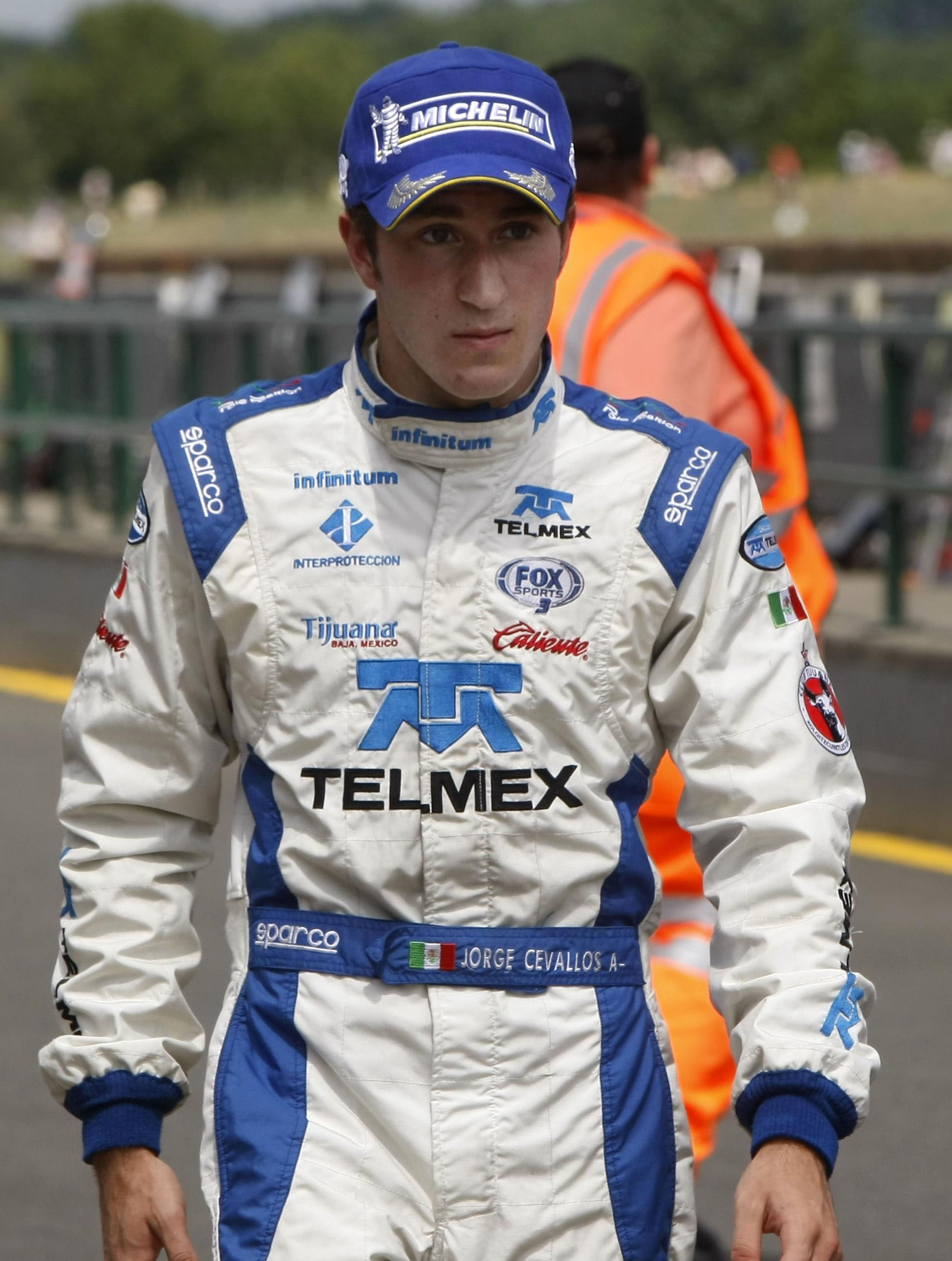
- Nationality: (Mexico) Mexican
- Born: Jorge Cevallos; June 16, 1994 (age 32) Tijuana, Mexico

Previous series
- 2012–2013 2016: Protyre Formula Renault Championship; Pro Mazda Championship

Jorge Cevallos (born June 16, 1994) is a Mexican racing driver from Tijuana, Baja California who resides in San Diego, California. He is a part of the Escuderia Telmex program which is responsible for F1 drivers Sergio Pérez, and Esteban Gutiérrez.

== Career ==
=== 2008-2011 Karting ===
Cevallos started karting in 2008 in the SDKA (San Diego Karting Association) regional championship, taking third place in HPV-2 Juniors in his rookie campaign. He then moved on to racing with Buddy Rice Karting, where he took fourth in the IKF Grand Nationals in 2010 and was also selected to represent team Mexico in the Rotax World Finals in La Conca, Italy. In 2011, his success continued with Buddy Rice Karting as he moved into the Senior Max Division, where he took podiums in Rotax Challenge of the Americas, Panamerican Championships, and Gatorz Karting Cup.

=== 2012-2013 Protyre Formula Renault UK ===
In 2012, Cevallos moved into the European Single Seater racing scene with a strong rookie campaign in the highly competitive Protyre Formula Renault Championship. Racing for Mtech-Lite, he led the way finishing ahead of his three team-mates to take 12th in the championship. His strongest point came at Thruxton qualifying 4th and finishing sixth, he would then match sixth place at croft after starting 12th.

In 2013, Cavellos returned to Protyre Formula Renault with Mark Godwin Motorsport, the team which took Josh Webster to second place in 2012. Immediately he showed his speed by taking a win at the opening round, and four podiums throughout the season. His remarkable consistency with nine top-fives finished earned him third place in the championship standings.

=== 2014 Formula Renault 2.0 ===
Cevallos competed in seven races in the 2014 Formula Renault 2.0 Northern European Cup with Fortec Motorsports. He left the series after the Hockhenheim round. He finished 25th in points with a best finish of tenth in the second race at the Silverstone Circuit. He also competed in the Circuit de Spa-Francorchamps round of the 2014 Formula Renault 2.0 Alps season as a guest driver, also with Fortec.

Cevallos did not race professionally in 2015 for medical reasons to heal from surgery to treat ulcerative colitis, which he was diagnosed with in early 2014.

=== 2016 Pro Mazda Championship ===
Cevallos returned to professional racing in the 2016 Pro Mazda Championship driving for CAPE Motorsports.

== Racing record ==
=== Career summary ===
Season	Series	Team	Races	Wins	Poles	F/Laps	Podiums	Points	Position
2012	Protyre Formula Renault UK	Mtech-Lite	14	0	0	0	0	123	12th
2013	Protyre Formula Renault UK	MGR Motorsport	16	1	0	0	4	307	**3rd**
2014	Formula Renault 2.0 NEC	Fortec Motorsports	7	0	0	0	0	32	25th
2014	Formula Renault 2.0 Alps	Fortec Motorsports	2	0	0	0	0	0	NC†
2016	Pro Mazda Championship	JDC Motorsports	4	0	0	0	0	79	10th
2016	Pro Mazda Championship	Cape Motorsports; Wayne Taylor Racing	2	0	0	0	0	79	10th

=== Complete Formula Renault 2.0 NEC results ===
(key) (Races in bold indicate pole position) (Races in italics indicate fastest lap)

Year	Entrant	1	2	3	4	5	6	7	8	9	10	11	12	13	14	15	16	17	DC	Points
2014	Fortec Motorsports	MNZ; 1 Ret	MNZ; 2; 22	SIL; 1; 17	SIL; 2; 10	HOC; 1; 17	HOC; 2; 14	HOC; 3; 15	SPA; 1	SPA; 2	ASS; 1	ASS; 2	MST; 1	MST; 2	MST; 3	NÜR; 1	NÜR; 2	NÜR; 3	25th	32

=== Complete Formula Renault 2.0 Alps Series results ===
(key) (Races in bold indicate pole position; races in italics indicate fastest lap)

Year	Team	1	2	3	4	5	6	7	8	9	10	11	12	13	14	Pos	Points
2014	Fortec Motorsports	IMO; 1	IMO; 2	PAU; 1	PAU; 2	RBR; 1	RBR; 2	SPA; 1; 11	SPA; 2; 19	MNZ; 1	MNZ; 2	MUG; 1 WD	MUG; 2 WD	JER; 1	JER; 2	NC†	0

† As Cevallos was a guest driver, he was ineligible to score points

=== Pro Mazda Championship ===
Year	Team	1	2	3	4	5	6	7	8	9	10	11	12	13	14	15	16	Rank	Points
2016	JDC Motorsports	STP; 7	STP; 9	ALA; 9	ALA; 8	IMS	IMS	LOR	ROA	ROA								**10th**	**79**
2016	Cape Motorsports Wayne Taylor Racing										TOR; 8	TOR; 7	MOH	MOH	LAG	LAG	LAG	**10th**	**79**

* Season still in progress
