= 2012 Formula Renault BARC season =

Season in motorsport competition

2012 Formula Renault BARC

Seasons
- ← 2011 2013 →

The Protyre 2012 Formula Renault BARC season was a multi-event motor racing championship for open wheel, formula racing cars held across England. The championship featured a mix of professional motor racing teams and privately funded drivers competing in 2 litre Formula Renault single seat race cars that conform to the technical regulations for the championship. The 2012 season was the 18th Formula Renault BARC Championship; the season began at Snetterton 200 on 7 April and ended on 7 October at Silverstone, after fourteen races, all held in England.

Following a second-place finish in the final race at Silverstone, Scott Malvern secured the championship title after achieving three victories during the season and eleven podiums in total, driving for Cliff Dempsey Racing in the opening half of the season and Cullen Motorsport thereafter. MGR Motorsport driver Josh Webster finished the season as runner-up for the second consecutive year; although he won five races – tied for most wins in the season along with Fortec Motorsport's Seb Morris – during the campaign, a less consistent finishing record allowed Malvern to take the title by 33 points via dropped scores. Morris was third at the end of the season, having started half of the season's races from pole position in his first year in the series having graduated from Ginetta Juniors. The only other race winner was Webster's team-mate David Wagner, who finished fourth in the championship.

== Teams and drivers ==
2012 Entry List
Team	No.	Driver name	Rounds
Middlehurst Motorsport	2	(United Kingdom) Chris Middlehurst	All
Cliff Dempsey Racing	3	(United States) Trent Hindman	1–3
Cliff Dempsey Racing	4	(United Kingdom) Scott Malvern	1–3
Cliff Dempsey Racing	22	(United States) Falco Wauer	5
Cliff Dempsey Racing	23	(United States) Matthew Brabham	6
Cliff Dempsey Racing	42	(United Kingdom) James Theodore	4
Cullen Motorsport	4	(United Kingdom) Scott Malvern	4–6
Cullen Motorsport	17	(United Kingdom) Ryan Cullen	6
Antel Motorsport	5	(Russia) Ivan Taranov	1–5
Antel Motorsport	6	(United Kingdom) Raoul Owens	All
Antel Motorsport	7	(United Kingdom) Tom Oliphant	All
Antel Motorsport	8	(United Kingdom) Henry Chart	All
Antel Motorsport	18	(United Kingdom) Jake Hughes	6
Scorpio Motorsport	5	(Russia) Ivan Taranov	6
Scorpio Motorsport	16	(Brazil) Henrique Baptista	All
Scorpio Motorsport	20	(United Kingdom) Macaulay Walsh	All
MGR Motorsport	9	(United Kingdom) Josh Webster	All
MGR Motorsport	25	(United Kingdom) Jake Dalton	All
MGR Motorsport	43	(United Kingdom) David Wagner	All
MGR Motorsport	66	(United Kingdom) James Fletcher	All
RPD Motorsport	10	(Nigeria) Ovie Iroro	2
Hillspeed	10	(United Kingdom) Matt Rao	6
Hillspeed	15	(United Kingdom) Struan Moore	5–6
Hillspeed	28	(United Kingdom) Kieran Vernon	2–6
Hillspeed	44	(Denmark) Jacob Nortoft	1–5
Hillspeed	49	(United Kingdom) Marcus Allen	1–2
MTECH Lite	11	(Lebanon) Joe Ghanem	2–6
MTECH Lite	12	(Lebanon) Shahan Sarkissian	2–6
MTECH Lite	33	(United Kingdom) Sean Walkinshaw	All
MTECH Lite	36	(Mexico) Jorge Cevallos	All
ACS Motorsport	13	(United Kingdom) Oliver Sirrell	1–5
Fortec Motorsports	21	(United Kingdom) Laura Tillett	All
Fortec Motorsports	26	(Mexico) Diego Menchaca	All
Fortec Motorsports	31	(United Kingdom) Seb Morris	All
Fortec Motorsports	88	(China) Martin Cao	All
SWB Motorsport	24	(Norway) Tommy Ostgaard	6
SWB Motorsport	27	(United Kingdom) Jack Dex	1–2, 6
JWA-Avila	30	(United Kingdom) Michael Epps	All
JWA-Avila	55	(United Kingdom) Matt Tiffin	All
National College for Motorsport	32	(United Kingdom) Max Robinson	6
Core Motorsport	50	(United Kingdom) Anton Spires	6

== Race calendar and results ==
The series will form part of the BARC club racing meetings and will expand to fourteen rounds at six events, with two triple header events. A provisional calendar was released on 10 November 2011, with the final round still to be confirmed. This first provisional calendar showed Snetterton and Brands Hatch as the season opening triple headers. A revised provisional calendar was released on 2 December 2011, adding Silverstone as the final round, in support of the British Touring Car Championship. The round at Brands Hatch was replaced in favour of a round at Thruxton. The calendar also had major date changes, with the triple header events moved to Snetterton, and Donington Park.

Round		Circuit	Date	Pole position	Fastest lap	Winning driver	Winning team
1	R1	Snetterton 200	7 April	(United Kingdom) Seb Morris	(United Kingdom) Scott Malvern	(United Kingdom) Josh Webster	MGR Motorsport
1	R2	Snetterton 200	8 April	(United Kingdom) Seb Morris	(United Kingdom) Seb Morris	(United Kingdom) Seb Morris	Fortec Motorsport
1	R3	Snetterton 200	8 April	(United Kingdom) Seb Morris	(United Kingdom) Scott Malvern	(United Kingdom) Scott Malvern	Cliff Dempsey Racing
2	R4	Rockingham Motor Speedway	20 May	(United Kingdom) Seb Morris	(United Kingdom) Scott Malvern	(United Kingdom) Seb Morris	Fortec Motorsport
2	R5	Rockingham Motor Speedway	20 May	(United Kingdom) Seb Morris	(United Kingdom) Seb Morris	(United Kingdom) Seb Morris	Fortec Motorsport
3	R6	Thruxton Circuit	17 June	(United Kingdom) Josh Webster	(United Kingdom) Josh Webster	(United Kingdom) Scott Malvern	Cliff Dempsey Racing
3	R7	Thruxton Circuit	17 June	(United Kingdom) Josh Webster	(United Kingdom) Scott Malvern	(United Kingdom) Josh Webster	MGR Motorsport
4	R8	Croft Circuit	22 July	(United Kingdom) Josh Webster	(United Kingdom) Josh Webster	(United Kingdom) Josh Webster	MGR Motorsport
4	R9	Croft Circuit	22 July	(United Kingdom) David Wagner	(United Kingdom) Scott Malvern	(United Kingdom) Josh Webster	MGR Motorsport
5	R10	Donington Park (National)	18 August	(United Kingdom) Josh Webster	(United Kingdom) Josh Webster	(United Kingdom) Josh Webster	MGR Motorsport
5	R11	Donington Park (National)	19 August	(United Kingdom) Scott Malvern	(United Kingdom) Scott Malvern	(United Kingdom) Scott Malvern	Cullen Motorsport
5	R12	Donington Park (National)	19 August	(United Kingdom) David Wagner	(United Kingdom) Seb Morris	(United Kingdom) David Wagner	MGR Motorsport
6	R13	Silverstone Circuit	6 October	(United Kingdom) Seb Morris	(United Kingdom) Seb Morris	(United Kingdom) Seb Morris	Fortec Motorsport
6	R14	Silverstone Circuit	7 October	(United Kingdom) Seb Morris	(United Kingdom) Scott Malvern	(United Kingdom) Seb Morris	Fortec Motorsport

== Championship standings ==
A driver's best 13 scores counted towards the championship, with any other points being discarded.

Pos	Driver	SNE			ROC		THR		CRO		DON			SIL		Points
1	(United Kingdom) Scott Malvern	13	3	1	2	2	1	5	4	2	2	1	2	3	2	368
2	(United Kingdom) Josh Webster	1	2	2	13	20	2	1	1	1	1	4	6	2	13	335
3	(United Kingdom) Seb Morris	6	1	5	1	1	10	Ret	Ret	11	Ret	5	3	1	1	274
4	(United Kingdom) David Wagner	2	4	6	6	Ret	6	Ret	6	3	7	2	1	Ret	5	243
5	(United Kingdom) Kieran Vernon				4	5	3	2	2	5	6	7	7	7	3	236
6	(United Kingdom) Macaulay Walsh	3	7	4	5	10	5	3	Ret	17	4	8	4	10	22	214
7	(United Kingdom) James Fletcher	Ret	5	7	3	3	18	8	3	8	8	6	12	9	9	210
8	(United Kingdom) Jake Dalton	5	Ret	3	7	12	4	4	13	Ret	5	10	8	14	8	192
9	(United Kingdom) Chris Middlehurst	11	14	15	Ret	Ret	DNS	11	11	10	3	3	5	5	Ret	147
10	(Russia) Ivan Taranov	9	6	16	18	7	9	9	14	12	Ret	19	19	8	4	142
11	(Mexico) Diego Menchaca	8	8	9	10	13	19	Ret	7	6	11	18	15	12	Ret	130
12	(Mexico) Jorge Cevallos	14	Ret	11	16	14	7	6	9	7	Ret	12	13	Ret	10	123
13	(United Kingdom) Michael Epps	19	15	13	15	21	Ret	DNS	10	Ret	9	9	9	4	7	112
14	(China) Martin Cao	Ret	12	12	8	4	22	7	DNS	15	Ret	13	11	25	18	100
15	(Denmark) Jacob Nortoft	Ret	Ret	DNS	9	8	14	15	Ret	9	10	11	10			87
16	(United Kingdom) Tom Oliphant	18	17	17	17	17	13	10	Ret	13	14	14	18	20	20	73
17	(United Kingdom) Jack Dex	7	9	10	Ret	Ret								11	6	71
18	(United Kingdom) Sean Walkinshaw	17	13	20	19	16	15	17	8	18	13	21	Ret	Ret	12	71
19	(United Kingdom) Raoul Owens	10	11	24	12	11	8	Ret	Ret	Ret	12	24	NC	23	19	70
20	(Brazil) Henrique Baptista	12	19	19	24	19	21	13	16	Ret	18	Ret	17	NC	11	51
21	(United Kingdom) James Theodore								5	4						42
22	(United Kingdom) Matt Tiffin	15	Ret	18	22	15	17	19	15	Ret	17	22	21	21	21	38
23	(Lebanon) Joe Ghanem				Ret	Ret	16	18	12	Ret	20	16	14	18	Ret	36
24	(United Kingdom) Oliver Sirrell	16	16	21	21	22	11	14	18	Ret	21	Ret	23			35
25	(United Kingdom) Marcus Allen	21	Ret	14	14	9										31
26	(United Kingdom) Laura Tillett	20	18	22	20	18	DNS	DNS	19	16	Ret	17	20	22	25	24
27	(United Kingdom) Struan Moore										19	23	16	13	17	21
28	(United Kingdom) Henry Chart	22	Ret	23	23	24	Ret	16	20	14	15	20	24	27	24	21
29	(Lebanon) Shahan Sarkissian				Ret	23	20	Ret	17	Ret	16	15	22	26	Ret	17
30	(United Kingdom) Jake Hughes													24	15	7
31	(Norway) Tommy Ostgaard													15	Ret	7
32	(United Kingdom) Matt Rao													16	Ret	6
33	(United Kingdom) Anton Spires													Ret	16	6
34	(United Kingdom) Ryan Cullen													17	23	5
35	(United Kingdom) Max Robinson													19	Ret	3
	(United States) Falco Wauer										Ret	Ret	Ret			0
	(Nigeria) Ovie Iroro				DNS	DNS										0
Ineligible drivers
	(United States) Trent Hindman	4	10	8	11	6	12	12								0
	(United States) Matthew Brabham													6	14	0
Pos	Driver	SNE			ROC		THR		CRO		DON			SIL		Points

Colour	Result
Gold	Winner
Silver	Second place
Bronze	Third place
Green	Points classification
Blue	Non-points classification
Blue	Non-classified finish (NC)
Purple	Retired, not classified (Ret)
Red	Did not qualify (DNQ)
Red	Did not pre-qualify (DNPQ)
Black	Disqualified (DSQ)
White	Did not start (DNS)
White	Withdrew (WD)
White	Race cancelled (C)
Blank	Did not practice (DNP)
Blank	Did not arrive (DNA)
Blank	Excluded (EX)

== Formula Renault BARC Winter Series ==
The 2012 Protyre Formula Renault BARC Winter Series with Michelin will be the 15th British Formula Renault Winter Series and the first season without the Formula Renault 2.0 UK championship, making this the first BARC championship only winter series. The series will commence at Brands Hatch on 20–21 October and end at Rockingham on 10 November, after four races at two rounds held in England.

=== Teams and drivers ===
The series organisers announced a 19 car grid on 18 October 2012, for the opening round of the winter series, with more cars expected for the Rockingham round.

Team	No.	Driver name	Rounds
Middlehurst Motorsport GTR	2	(United Kingdom) Chris Middlehurst	All
MGR Motorsport	4	(Sweden) Gustav Malja	1
MGR Motorsport	8	(United Kingdom) Jake Hughes	2
MGR Motorsport	14	(United Kingdom) Matt Mason	All
MGR Motorsport	15	(United Kingdom) Tom Oliphant	2
Cliff Dempsey Racing (Team USA) (Note: Matthew Brabham competed with the Team USA Banner)	5	(Australia) Olly Rae	All
Cliff Dempsey Racing (Team USA)	23	(United States) Matthew Brabham	All
Cullen Motorsport	7	(United Kingdom) Ryan Cullen	1
MTech Lite	9	(Lebanon) Joe Ghanem	All
MTech Lite	13	(Lebanon) Shahan Sarkissian	2
MTech Lite	33	(United Kingdom) Sean Walkinshaw	All
Hillspeed	10	(United Kingdom) Matthew Rao	All
Hillspeed	21	(United Kingdom) George Gamble	All
Core Motorsport	11	(Russia) Ivan Taranov	All
Core Motorsport	30	(United Kingdom) Michael Epps	All
Fortec Motorsport	12	(United Kingdom) Jack Aitken	All
Fortec Motorsport	16	(Indonesia) Patric Armand	2
Fortec Motorsport	26	(United Kingdom) Laura Tillett	1
Fortec Motorsport	31	(United Kingdom) Seb Morris	All
Fortec Motorsport	88	(China) Hongwei Cao	All
Jamun Racing Services	17	(United Kingdom) Luke Williams	All
SWB Motorsport	27	(United Kingdom) Cameron Twynham	All
Kingdom Motorsport	50	(United Kingdom) Anton Spires	1

=== Race calendar and results ===
The calendar was announced by the championship organisers on 7 September 2012, with the first round at Brands Hatch in support of the British Touring Car Championship.

Round		Circuit	Date	Pole position	Fastest lap	Winning driver	Winning team
1	R1	Brands Hatch GP	20 October	(United Kingdom) Matt Mason	(United Kingdom) Matt Mason	(United Kingdom) Seb Morris	Fortec Motorsport
1	R2	Brands Hatch GP	21 October	(United Kingdom) Jack Aitken	(United Kingdom) Matt Mason	(United Kingdom) Matt Mason	MGR Motorsport
2	R3	Rockingham Motor Speedway	10 November	(United Kingdom) Seb Morris	(United Kingdom) Seb Morris	(United Kingdom) Seb Morris	Fortec Motorsport
2	R4	Rockingham Motor Speedway	10 November	(United Kingdom) Seb Morris	(United Kingdom) Jack Aitken (Note: Aitken achieved the fastest lap among championship competitors, as Matthew Brabham set the fastest lap of the race, but was ineligible to score the two championship points on offer.)	(United Kingdom) Jack Aitken	Fortec Motorsport

=== Championship standings ===
Pos	Driver	BRH		ROC		Points
1	(United Kingdom) Seb Morris	1	4	1	4	113
2	(United Kingdom) Jack Aitken	2	3	3	1	112
3	(United Kingdom) Matt Mason	6	1	5	3	104
4	(United Kingdom) Chris Middlehurst	3	2	4	6	95
5	(China) Hongwei Cao	7	9	2	5	82
6	(United Kingdom) Cameron Twynham	10	6	10	12	54
7	(United Kingdom) George Gamble	8	7	Ret	8	50
8	(Russia) Ivan Taranov	15	Ret	6	7	43
9	(United Kingdom) Sean Walkinshaw	12	14	13	10	39
10	(United Kingdom) Michael Epps	4	Ret	Ret	9	36
11	(Australia) Olly Rae	14	10	12	18	34
12	(United Kingdom) Ryan Cullen	9	8			30
13	(Lebanon) Joe Ghanem	Ret	11	11	14	30
14	(United Kingdom) Jake Hughes			8	13	23
15	(United Kingdom) Tom Oliphant			7	16	22
16	(United Kingdom) Anton Spires	11	13			20
17	(United Kingdom) Laura Tillett	13	12			19
18	(United Kingdom) Luke Williams	Ret	15	Ret	15	14
19	(Lebanon) Shahan Sarkissian			14	17	13
20	(United Kingdom) Matt Rao	DNS	DNS	Ret	11	11
	(Sweden) Gustav Malja	Ret	Ret			0
Ineligible drivers
	(United States) Matthew Brabham	5	5	9	2	0
	(Indonesia) Patric Armand			Ret	Ret	0
Pos	Driver	BRH		ROC		Points

Colour	Result
Gold	Winner
Silver	Second place
Bronze	Third place
Green	Points classification
Blue	Non-points classification
Blue	Non-classified finish (NC)
Purple	Retired, not classified (Ret)
Red	Did not qualify (DNQ)
Red	Did not pre-qualify (DNPQ)
Black	Disqualified (DSQ)
White	Did not start (DNS)
White	Withdrew (WD)
White	Race cancelled (C)
Blank	Did not practice (DNP)
Blank	Did not arrive (DNA)
Blank	Excluded (EX)
