= British Formula Renault Championship =

Auto racing championship in the United Kingdom

British Formula Renault Championship referred to one of two Formula Renault championships that were held in the United Kingdom. The main series was Renault Sport UK's Formula Renault 2.0 UK championship which was held from 1989 to 2011 and was generally recognized as the British Formula Renault championship. However, in March 2012 it was announced that the Formula Renault UK series would not take place in 2012, with the series being ended definitively in September 2012. A secondary championship organised by the British Automobile Racing Club and known as the Protyre Formula Renault Championship was held continuously between 1995 and 2014. The championship was the only Formula Renault 2.0 championship operating in the United Kingdom after the demise of the main series, but was ended after the 2014 season.

== History ==
The "British Formula Renault Championship", was founded by the British Automobile Racing Club (BARC) in 1989. Renault Sport UK took over the organization of the championship from the following year. This championship was recognized as "British Formula Renault", although the official name of the championship was changed to the "Formula Renault 2.0 UK Championship" in 2005. The BARC organized a second championship in 1995. From then, until 2011, two championships existed in the United Kingdom. However, the BARC championship differed from the UK championship in that it is a mainly amateur series. The BARC championship's Club Class uses old chassis previously used in the UK series. Renault Sport UK also supports the BARC series. In 2000, Tatuus replaced the chassis and it pioneered the modern one make racing series that is common today in GP2 Series, GP3 Series and Formula Renault 3.5 Series.

Several notable Formula One Drivers have raced in the series including Lewis Hamilton, Paul di Resta and Heikki Kovalainen but probably the biggest star from Formula Renault UK was Kimi Räikkönen, the champion in 2000, who made a successful debut in Formula One the next year. This brought keen attention to the different Formula Renault 2.0 Championships and became a chance to found new championships in Italy, Brazil and Asia. Both Räikkönen and then Hamilton went on to become Formula One World Champions in 2007 and 2008, respectively. It then became the reference championship for any aspiring single seater driver to compete in, especially in Western Europe.

In March 2012, it was announced that the Formula Renault UK series would not take place in 2012. This was due to a low number of entries to the championship after only receiving six confirmed competitors, as the price for competing for a season was reaching £200,000. Originally, it was planned by series promoter Stéphane Ratel Organisation that the championship would take a one-year hiatus, leading to a re-launch in 2013. However, it was reported in the media that the series was ended definitively in September 2012.

A new proposal to reintroduce Formula Renault UK was made by the BARC and motorsport promoter Grovewood in 2014. The revived series would be a two-tier championship, with the modern Tatuus FR2.0/13 being used alongside the older machines used in the BARC series. Formula Renault BARC, which had been suffering from declining grid sizes, would be absorbed into the new championship. The plan was dropped after a breakdown in negotiations with Formula Renault's organisers, and the lack of demand for a new junior single-seater series in competition with the new Formula 4 class MSA Formula and BRDC Formula 4. With the failure of the plan, the BARC also dropped their existing Formula Renault series, leaving no dedicated British Formula Renault Championship for 2015. The BARC instead planned to run a Formula Libre category, which would accommodate the existing Formula Renault cars alongside those from other Formulas whose British championships had recently ended.

== Formula Renault 2.0 UK ==
Formula Renault 2.0 UK
- Category: Formula Renault 2.0; Open Wheel Racing
- Country: United Kingdom
- Inaugural season: 1989
- Folded: 2011
- Constructors: Barazi-Epsilon
- Engine suppliers: Renault
- Last Drivers' champion: (United Kingdom) Alex Lynn
- Last Teams' champion: (United Kingdom) Fortec Motorsports
- Official website: Formula Renault UK

The Renault Sport championship organised an annual regular series, supporting the British Touring Car Championship and UK round of the World Series by Renault, as well as a winter series. The regular series was the main championship and at its peak, held 20 races over 10 meetings. Originally known as Formula Renault UK the championship used engines of 1,721cc. Between 1995 and 1999 the championship was called Formula Renault Sport UK and used a 2,000cc 8V engine was used. Another name change in 2000 say the series known as Formula Renault 2000 UK before adopting Formula Renault 2.0 UK in 2005. Since 2000 the championship has used 2,000cc 16V engines. The French tyre manufacturer Michelin was the tyre supplier and the title sponsor of the series since 1992.

Several notable Formula One Drivers have raced in the series including Kimi Räikkönen, Lewis Hamilton, Paul di Resta and Heikki Kovalainen.

=== Graduate Cup ===
The UK Championship had a secondary class, known as the Graduate Cup. The scheme aimed to help young drivers enter the championship. The highest placed Graduate Cup driver for each round received a trophy on podium and the overall Graduate Cup winner received a discount on the entry fee for the Formula Renault 2.0 UK or Clio Cup UK championships. To be eligible to race in the Graduate Cup Class drivers had to have competed in no more than two Formula Renault 2.0 race meetings before the current season (except drivers who have previously taken part in the Formula Renault UK Winter Cup or have raced in the Formula Renault BARC Championship) and must be under 19 years of age.

=== Weekend Format ===
The weekend started with a Friday testing session at each venue. This was made up of two 25 minute sessions. Saturday consisted of Two 20 minute qualifying sessions which decided the grid for the two 30 minute races, with both held either on the Sunday or the first race on Saturday afternoon and the second race on Sunday. Drivers scored points down to 20th place with two points for fastest lap. Only the best 18 results counted towards the championship with points shared out using the following system:

Position																				Fastest Lap
1st	2nd	3rd	4th	5th	6th	7th	8th	9th	10th	11th	12th	13th	14th	15th	16th	17th	18th	19th	20th	Fastest Lap
32	28	25	22	20	18	16	14	12	11	10	9	8	7	6	5	4	3	2	1	2

=== Champions ===
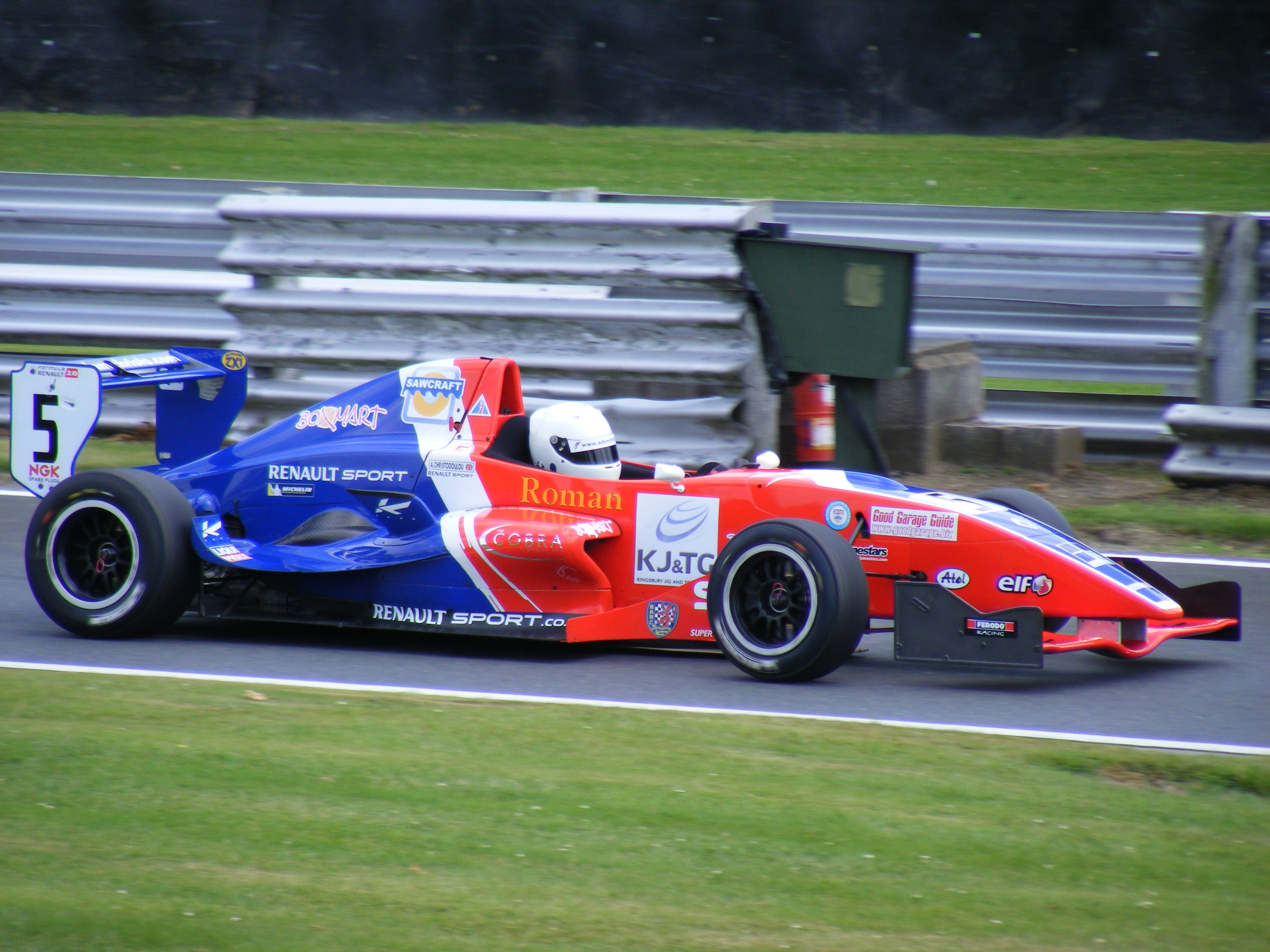
2008 Formula Renault 2.0 UK Champion Adam Christodoulou.

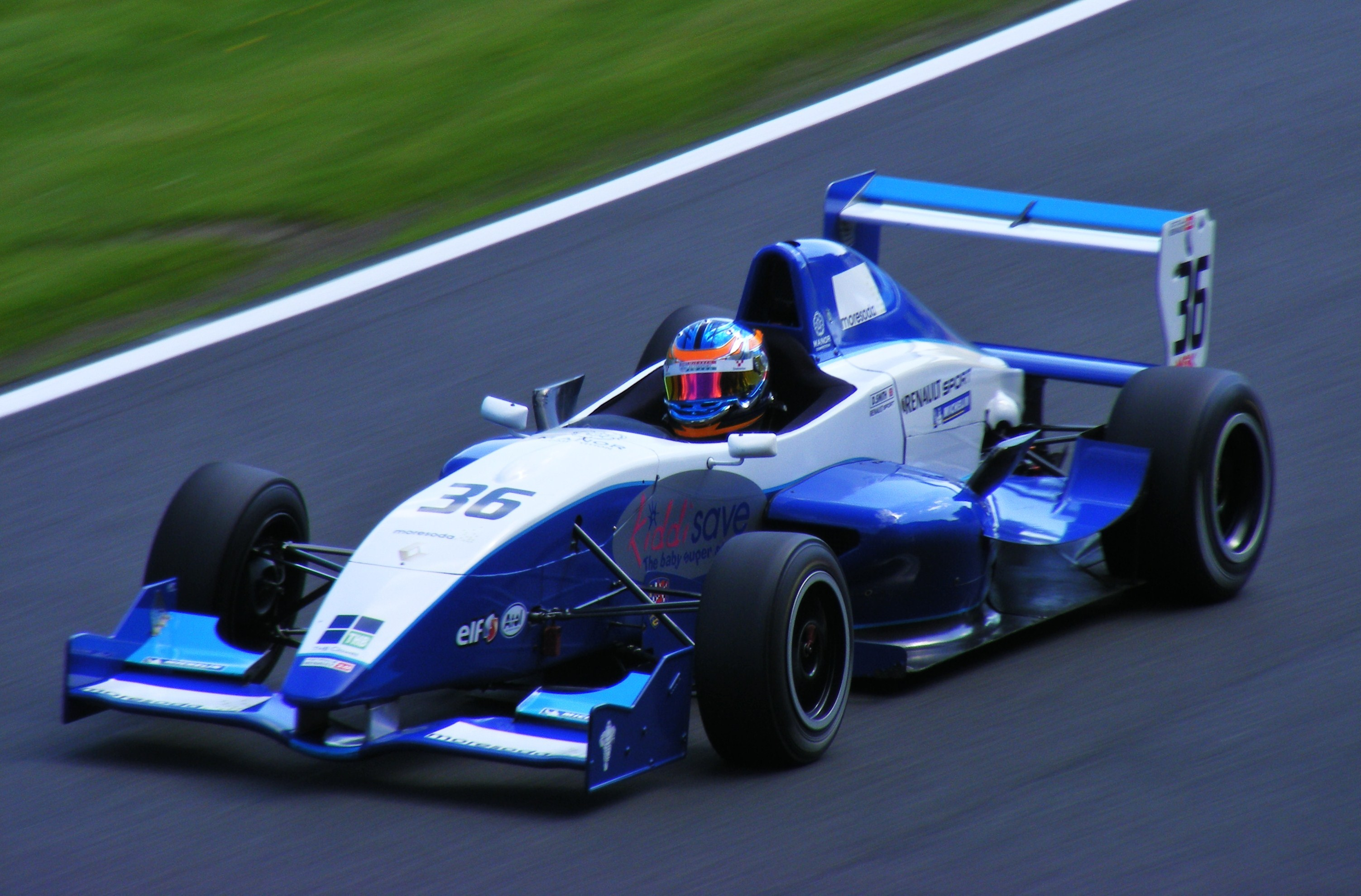
2009 Formula Renault 2.0 UK Champion Dean Smith.

Season	Champion	Team Champion	Winter/Finals Champion
1989	(United Kingdom) Neil Riddiford	(United Kingdom) Tarry Racing	Not held
1990	(Brazil) Thomas Erdos	(United Kingdom) Fortec Motorsport	Not held
1991	(United Kingdom) Bobby Verdon-Roe	(United Kingdom) Fortec Motorsport	Not held
1992	(Spain) Pedro de la Rosa	Racing for Spain-Minister	Not held
1993	(Spain) Ivan Arias	Racing for Spain-Minister	Not held
1994	(United Kingdom) James Matthews	(United Kingdom) Manor Motorsport	Not held
1995	(United Kingdom) Guy Smith	(United Kingdom) Manor Motorsport	Not held
1996	(United Kingdom) David Cook	(United Kingdom) DCCook Racing	Not held
1997	(United Kingdom) Marc Hynes	(United Kingdom) Manor Motorsport	Not held
1998	(Brazil) Aluizio Coelho	(United Kingdom) Manor Motorsport	(Brazil) Antônio Pizzonia
1999	(Brazil) Antônio Pizzonia	(United Kingdom) Manor Motorsport	(Finland) Kimi Räikkönen
2000	(Finland) Kimi Räikkönen	(United Kingdom) Manor Motorsport	(United Kingdom) Mark McLoughlin
2001	(United Kingdom) Carl Breeze	(United Kingdom) Motaworld Racing	(United Kingdom) Robert Bell
2002	(United Kingdom) Danny Watts	(United Kingdom) Fortec Motorsport	(United Kingdom) Robert Bell
2003	(United Kingdom) Lewis Hamilton	(United Kingdom) Manor Motorsport	(United Kingdom) Jay Howard
2004	(United Kingdom) Mike Conway	(United Kingdom) Fortec Motorsport	(United Kingdom) Stuart Hall
2005	(United Kingdom) Oliver Jarvis	(United Kingdom) Manor Motorsport	(Netherlands) Junior Strous
2006	(Sweden) Sebastian Hohenthal	(United Kingdom) Fortec Motorsport	(France) Franck Mailleux
2007	(United Kingdom) Duncan Tappy	(United Kingdom) Fortec Motorsport	(United Kingdom) Richard Singleton (Note: Valtteri Bottas won three of the four races and placed second on the final race, but did not gain any championship points, as he did not have a license for the series.)
2008	(United Kingdom) Adam Christodoulou	(United Kingdom) CRS Racing	(United Kingdom) James Calado
2009	(United Kingdom) Dean Smith	(United Kingdom) Manor Competition	(United Kingdom) Harry Tincknell
2010	(United Kingdom) Tom Blomqvist	(United Kingdom) Fortec Motorsport	(United Kingdom) Alex Lynn
2011	(United Kingdom) Alex Lynn	(United Kingdom) Fortec Motorsports	(United Kingdom) Oliver Rowland

== Protyre Formula Renault Championship ==
Protyre Formula Renault
- Category: Formula Renault 2.0; Open Wheel Racing
- Country: United Kingdom
- Inaugural season: 1995
- Folded: 2014
- Drivers: 39 (2012)
- Teams: 15 (2012)
- Constructors: Tatuus
- Engine suppliers: Renault
- Tyre suppliers: Michelin by Protyre
- Last Drivers' champion: (Brazil) Pietro Fittipaldi
- Official website: Formula Renault BARC

The Protyre Formula Renault Championship, organized by the British Automobile Racing Club, began in 1995 as a secondary championship to the Renault Sport UK championship. The series was named Formula Renault BARC Championship. In 1995 and 1996, the technical regulation used by the Formula Renault BARC Championship was the one used by the Formula Renault UK Championship between 1989 and 1994. Only since 2005, most of the regulations relating to the cars are the same as the UK series, but the cars have fixed gear ratios, an intake restrictor to limit engine wear, and are limited to one new set of tyres per outing. The championship used the older Formula Renault Tatuus chassis first introduced to Formula Renault racing in 2000 and updated in 2007, which makes the championship a viable prospect to drivers with lower levels of budget and funding. With the collapse of the Renault Sport championship in early 2012, the BARC Championship became the prominent Formula Renault Championship in the United Kingdom and from 2013, took the name Protyre Formula Renault Championship, dropping the BARC tag after its growth into one of the leading national single seater championships in Great Britain. Despite its initial growth, grid sizes fell in subsequent seasons, and the championship ended in 2014.

=== Weekend Format ===
The weekend starts with a general testing session on the Friday. This was made up of two 25 minute sessions. Qualifying is held on Saturday and consists of two 20 minute sessions which decide the grid for the two 30 mile races, with both races held on the Sunday. During the 2012 season, triple header events were introduced. Qualifying for race one and two remains the same, however the race three grid is decided by the second fastest time set during the second qualifying session. During triple header weekends, the first race is held on Saturday with the remaining two races held on the Sunday. Drivers score points down to 20th place with two points for fastest lap. All rounds, less one, count towards the championship with points shared out using the following system:

Position																				Fastest Lap
1st	2nd	3rd	4th	5th	6th	7th	8th	9th	10th	11th	12th	13th	14th	15th	16th	17th	18th	19th	20th	Fastest Lap
32	28	25	22	20	18	16	14	12	11	10	9	8	7	6	5	4	3	2	1	2

=== Latest season ===
The 2013 Protyre Formula Renault Championship will be the 19th Championship organized by the British Automobile Racing Club and the second year as the UK's only premier Formula Renault 2.0 championship. The season will begin at Donington Park on 14 April and end on 29 September at Silverstone Circuit. The series will form part of the BARC club racing meetings and will expand from fourteen to sixteen rounds at six events all held in England, with four triple header events.

=== Champions ===
Formula Renault BARC
Season	Champion	Winter/Finals Champion
1995	(United Kingdom) David Henderson	Not held
1996	(United Kingdom) Ian Astley	Not held
1997	(United Kingdom) Peter Clarke	Not held
1998	(United Kingdom) Nick Dudfield	Not held
1999	(United Kingdom) Elliot Lewis	Not held
2000	(United Kingdom) Jamie Beales	Not held
2001	(United Kingdom) Martin Wallbank	Not held
2002	(United Kingdom) Jeremy Smith	Not held
2003	(United Kingdom) James Gornall	Not held
2004	(United Kingdom) Nicky Wilson	Not held
2005	(United Kingdom) Nick Wilcox	Not held
2006	(United Kingdom) Richard Singleton	Not held
2007	(United Kingdom) Hywel Lloyd	(United Kingdom) Hywel Lloyd
2008	(United Kingdom) Ollie Hancock	(United Kingdom) James Theodore
2009	(United Kingdom) Kieren Clark	Not held
2010	(United Kingdom) Alice Powell	(United Kingdom) Josh Webster
2011	(United Kingdom) Dino Zamparelli	(Spain) Victor Jiminez
2012	(United Kingdom) Scott Malvern	(United Kingdom) Seb Morris

Protyre Formula Renault Championship
Season	Champion	Autumn Champion
2013	(United Kingdom) Chris Middlehurst	(United Kingdom) Ben Barnicoat
2014	(Brazil) Pietro Fittipaldi	Not held

== Teams Participating ==
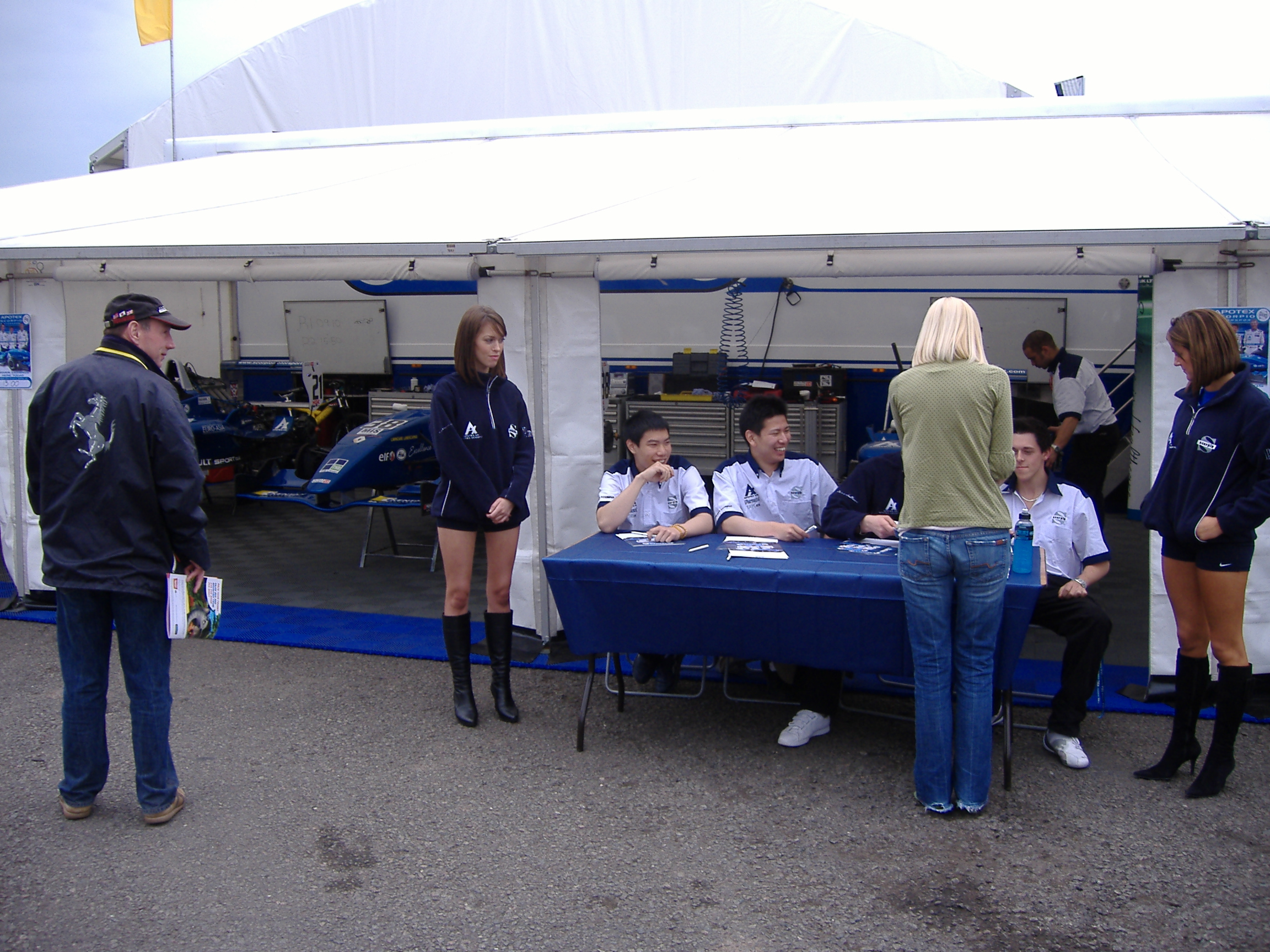
The Scorpio Motorsport team at Donington Park in 2008.

The following teams have competed in either the Renault Sport Championship or the BARC Championship.

- Antel Motorsport
- Apotec Scorpio
- Cliff Dempsey Racing
- CORE Motorsport
- Cullen Motorsport
- CRS Racing
- Falcon Motorsport
- Fortec Motorsport
- Hillspeed
- Jamun Racing
- JWA-Avila
- Manor Motorsport
- Manor Competition
- Mark Burdett Motorsport
- MTECH Lite
- Mark Godwin Racing
- RPD Motorsport
- Team DFR
- Scorpio Motorsport
- SWB Motorsport
- Vitulli Racing
- Welch Motorsport
