= Matt Rao =

British-Indian racing driver (born 1994)

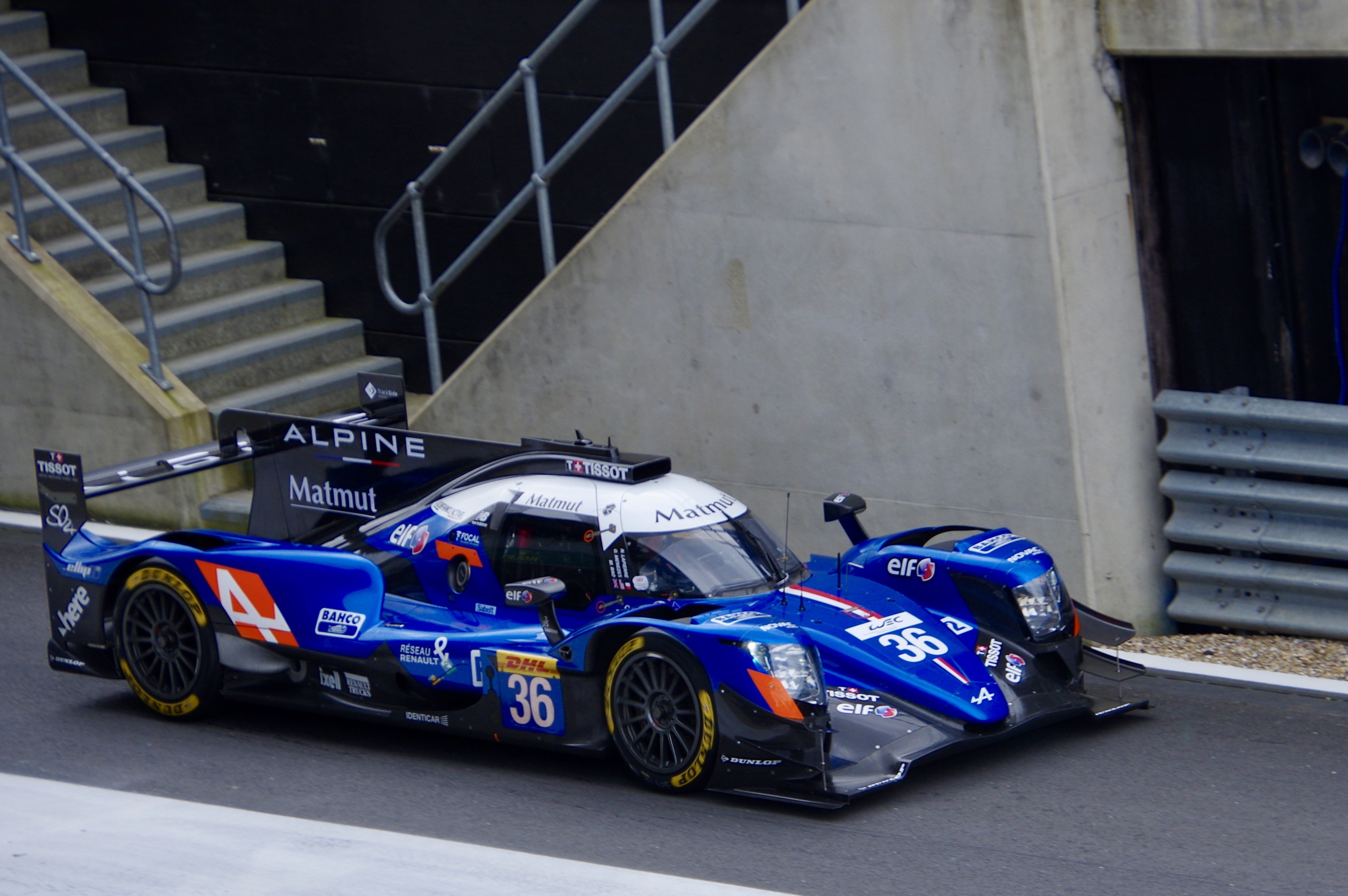
- Rao in 2017
- Nationality: (United Kingdom) British
- Born: 3 May 1994 (age 32) Toulouse, France
- Categorisation: FIA Silver

Championship titles
- 2012: British Formula Ford Championship – Duratec

Matthew Kiran Rao (born 3 May 1994) is a British-Indian racing driver who last competed for Signatech Alpine Matmut and CEFC Manor TRS Racing in the LMP2 class of the FIA World Endurance Championship in 2017.

== Personal life ==
Rao is the son of Indian-born British businessman Dr. Martin Kiran Rao, who worked at Airbus as the company's Executive Vice President of Strategy and Marketing. Rao's brother James (1992–2014), also worked in the aviation industry, serving as a commercial airline pilot for Safi Airways until his death in April 2014 due to cancer.

== Career ==
Rao began his single-seater career in 2011 by competing in the British Formula Ford Championship for Fluid Motorsport, finishing runner-up in the Scholarship class. Returning to the series for the following year, Rao secured the Duratec title with four wins and nine other podiums to his name. Towards the end of 2012, Rao also raced for Hillspeed in the last round of the Formula Renault BARC main series and the two-round Winter Series.

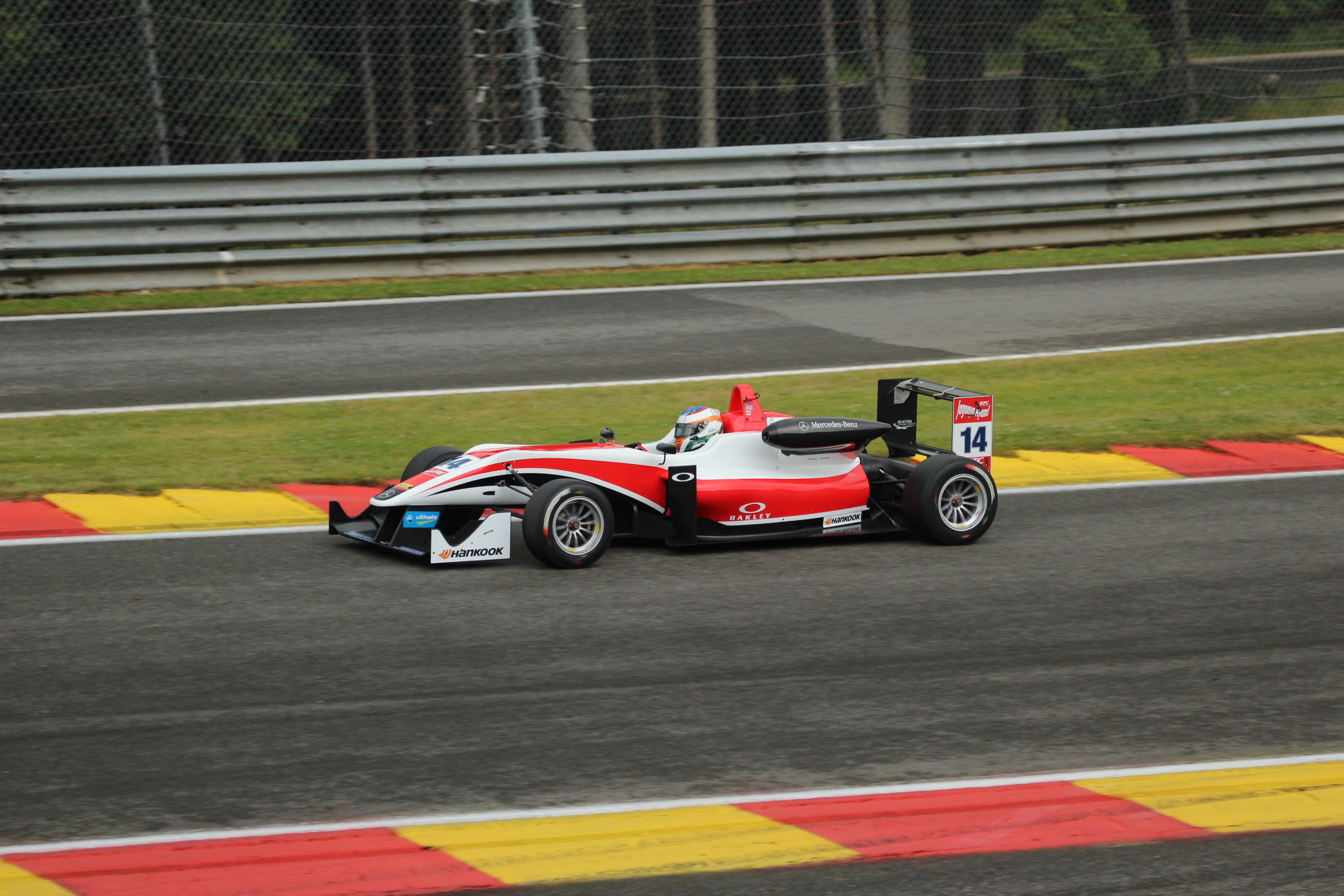
Rao driving for Fortec in Formula 3 at Spa in 2015.

Stepping up to full-time Formula Renault competition in 2013, Rao remained with Hillspeed to compete in the Protyre Formula Renault Championship. In his only season in the series, Rao scored a best result of third in race three at Snetterton en route to a 15th-place points finish at the end of the year. At the start of the following year, Rao joined Giles Motorsport to compete in the New Zealand–based Toyota Racing Series, in which he took a best result of fifth in race one at Hampton Downs to take 14th in the overall standings. The following year, Rao joined Fortec Motorsport to compete in the British Formula 3 International Series. After scoring his first win of the season at Rockingham and winning at Snetterton, Rao won again at Thruxton and the final two Donington Park races to secure runner-up honours in points behind Martin Cao. At the end of the year, Rao took part in the GP3 Series post-season tests at Yas Marina for Carlin.

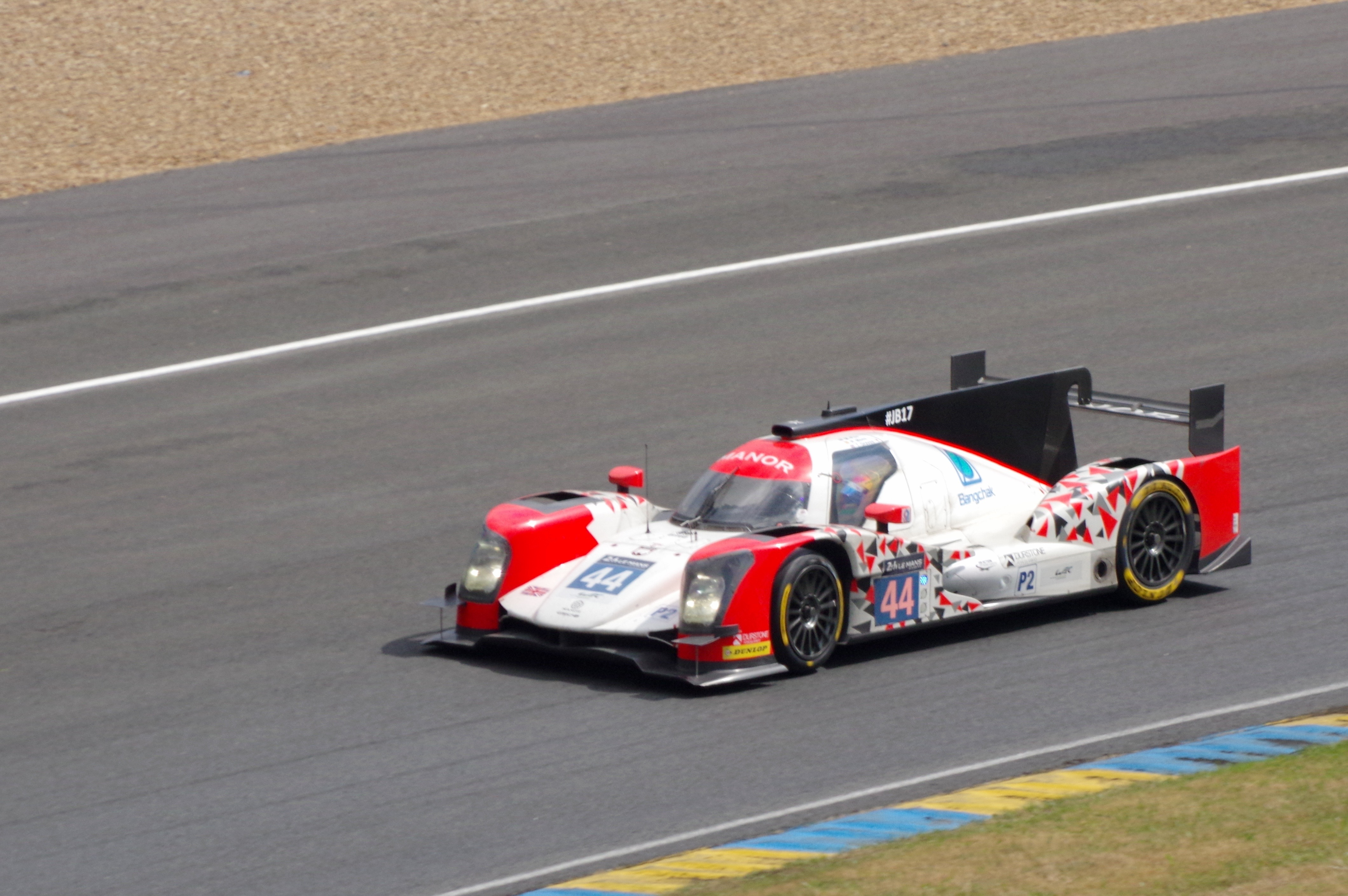
Rao made his 24 Hours of Le Mans debut in 2016 for Manor's LMP2 team.

Remaining with Fortec for 2015, Rao raced with them in the FIA Formula 3 European Championship, in which he failed to score a point and took a best result of 14th at both the Hockenheimring and Spa. At the end of the year, Rao partook in the FIA World Endurance Championship rookie test in Bahrain for Signatech Alpine's LMP2 squad. In 2016, Rao made the full-time switch to sportscars, as he joined Manor to compete in the LMP2 class of the FIA World Endurance Championship. Dabbling between the team's No. 44 and No. 45 entries, Rao scored his only podium of the season at the 6 Hours of Spa with Roberto Merhi and Richard Bradley, as well as helping Alex Lynn secure pole position at the 6 Hours of Shanghai.

Continuing in the WEC for 2017, Rao joined Signatech Alpine Matmut in the team's No. 36 car to partner Gustavo Menezes, Nicolas Lapierre and Romain Dumas. Racing with the team through the first four rounds, Rao finished third at the 6 Hours of Nürburgring before parting ways with the team. Rao saw out the rest of the season with CEFC Manor TRS Racing, finishing third on his return at the 6 Hours of Mexico alongside Ben Hanley and Jean-Éric Vergne, and took seventh in the LMP2 standings.

== Racing record ==
=== Racing career summary ===
| Season | Series | Team | Races | Wins | Poles | F/Laps | Podiums | Points | Position |
|---|---|---|---|---|---|---|---|---|---|
| 2011 | British Formula Ford Championship – Scholarship | Fluid Motorsport | 11 | 1 | 0 | 0 | 9 | 243 | **2nd** |
| 2011 | Formula Ford Festival | | 1 | 0 | 0 | 0 | 0 | —N/a | DNF |
| 2012 | British Formula Ford Championship | Fluid Motorsport Development | 23 | 0 | 0 | 0 | 0 | 118 | 10th |
| 2012 | British Formula Ford Championship – Duratec | Fluid Motorsport Development | 23 | 4 | 9 | 6 | 13 | 515 | **1st** |
| 2012 | Dutch Formula Ford Championship | Fluid Motorsport Development | 4 | 0 | 0 | 0 | 0 | 30 | 21st |
| 2012 | Formula Renault BARC | Hillspeed | 2 | 0 | 0 | 0 | 0 | 6 | 32nd |
| 2012 | Formula Renault BARC Winter Series | Hillspeed | 2 | 0 | 0 | 0 | 0 | 11 | 20th |
| 2013 | Protyre Formula Renault Championship | Hillspeed | 14 | 0 | 0 | 0 | 1 | 128 | 15th |
| 2014 | Toyota Racing Series | Giles Motorsport | 15 | 0 | 0 | 0 | 0 | 394 | 14th |
| 2014 | British Formula 3 International Series | Fortec Motorsport | 21 | 5 | 3 | 7 | 15 | 283 | **2nd** |
| 2015 | FIA Formula 3 European Championship | Fortec Motorsports | 33 | 0 | 0 | 0 | 0 | 0 | 29th |
| 2016 | FIA World Endurance Championship – LMP2 | Manor | 9 | 0 | 1 | 0 | 1 | 33 | 17th |
| 2016 | 24 Hours of Le Mans – LMP2 | Manor | 1 | 0 | 0 | 0 | 0 | —N/a | DNF |
| 2017 | FIA World Endurance Championship – LMP2 | Signatech Alpine Matmut | 4 | 0 | 0 | 0 | 1 | 100 | 7th |
| 2017 | FIA World Endurance Championship – LMP2 | CEFC Manor TRS Racing | 5 | 0 | 0 | 0 | 1 | 100 | 7th |
| 2017 | 24 Hours of Le Mans – LMP2 | Signatech Alpine Matmut | 1 | 0 | 0 | 0 | 0 | —N/a | 8th |

=== Complete Protyre Formula Renault Championship results ===
(key) (Races in bold indicate pole position; races in italics indicate fastest lap)

| Year | Team | 1 | 2 | 3 | 4 | 5 | 6 | 7 | 8 | 9 | 10 | 11 | 12 | 13 | 14 | 15 | 16 | Pos | Points |
|---|---|---|---|---|---|---|---|---|---|---|---|---|---|---|---|---|---|---|---|
| 2013 | Hillspeed | DON; 1; 8 | DON; 2; 8 | SNE; 1; 14 | SNE; 2; 17 | SNE; 3; 3 | THR; 1; 9 | THR; 2; 7 | THR; 3 DNS | CRO; 1; 8 | CRO; 2 Ret | CRO; 3 Ret | ROC; 1; 10 | ROC; 2; 10 | ROC; 3 Ret | SIL; 1 Ret | SIL; 2 DNS | 15th | 128 |

=== Complete Toyota Racing Series results ===
(key) (Races in bold indicate pole position) (Races in italics indicate fastest lap)

| Year | Entrant | 1 | 2 | 3 | 4 | 5 | 6 | 7 | 8 | 9 | 10 | 11 | 12 | 13 | 14 | 15 | Pos | Points |
|---|---|---|---|---|---|---|---|---|---|---|---|---|---|---|---|---|---|---|
| 2014 | Giles Motorsport | TER; 1; 14 | TER; 2; 20 | TER; 3; 15 | TIM; 1; 10 | TIM; 2 Ret | TIM; 3; 13 | HIG; 1; 14 | HIG; 2; 8 | HIG; 3; 12 | HMP; 1; 5 | HMP; 2; 10 | HMP; 3; 9 | MAN; 1; 18 | MAN; 2; 19 | MAN; 3; 10 | 14th | 394 |

=== Complete British Formula 3 International Series results ===
(key) (Races in bold indicate pole position) (Races in italics indicate fastest lap)

| Year | Entrant | 1 | 2 | 3 | 4 | 5 | 6 | 7 | 8 | 9 | 10 | 11 | 12 | 13 | 14 | 15 | 16 | 17 | 18 | 19 | 20 | 21 | DC | Points |
|---|---|---|---|---|---|---|---|---|---|---|---|---|---|---|---|---|---|---|---|---|---|---|---|---|
| 2014 | Fortec Motorsport | ROC; 1 Ret | ROC; 2; 4 | ROC; 3; 1 | SIL; 1; 5 | SIL; 2 Ret | SIL; 3; 3 | SNE; 1; 3 | SNE; 2; 1 | SNE; 3; 3 | SPA; 1; 8 | SPA; 2; 6 | SPA; 3; 4 | **THR**; **1**; 2 | THR; 2; 2 | **THR**; **3**; 1 | BRH; 1; 4 | BRH; 2; 2 | BRH; 3; 3 | DON; 1; 3 | DON; 2; 1 | **DON**; **3**; 1 | 2nd | 283 |

=== Complete FIA Formula 3 European Championship results ===
(key) (Races in bold indicate pole position) (Races in italics indicate fastest lap)

| Year | Entrant | Engine | 1 | 2 | 3 | 4 | 5 | 6 | 7 | 8 | 9 | 10 | 11 | 12 | 13 | 14 | 15 | 16 | 17 | 18 | 19 | 20 | 21 | 22 | 23 | 24 | 25 | 26 | 27 | 28 | 29 | 30 | 31 | 32 | 33 | DC | Points |
|---|---|---|---|---|---|---|---|---|---|---|---|---|---|---|---|---|---|---|---|---|---|---|---|---|---|---|---|---|---|---|---|---|---|---|---|---|---|
| 2015 | Fortec Motorsports | Mercedes | SIL; 1 Ret | SIL; 2; 22 | SIL; 3 Ret | HOC; 1; 14 | HOC; 2; 16 | HOC; 3; 31 | PAU; 1; 19 | PAU; 2; 24 | PAU; 3; 19 | MNZ; 1; 16 | MNZ; 2; 15 | MNZ; 3 EX | SPA; 1; 23 | SPA; 2; 14 | SPA; 3 Ret | NOR; 1; 23 | NOR; 2; 21 | NOR; 3 Ret | ZAN; 1; 22 | ZAN; 2; 23 | ZAN; 3; 27 | RBR; 1; 25 | RBR; 2; 31 | RBR; 3; 25 | ALG; 1; 25 | ALG; 2 Ret | ALG; 3; 21 | NÜR; 1; 22 | NÜR; 2; 18 | NÜR; 3 Ret | HOC; 1; 23 | HOC; 2; 28 | HOC; 3; 18 | 29th | 0 |

=== Complete FIA World Endurance Championship results ===
(key) (Races in bold indicate pole position; results in italics indicate fastest lap)

| Year | Entrant | Class | Chassis | Engine | 1 | 2 | 3 | 4 | 5 | 6 | 7 | 8 | 9 | Rank | Points |
|---|---|---|---|---|---|---|---|---|---|---|---|---|---|---|---|
| 2016 | Manor | LMP2 | Oreca 05 | Nissan VK45DE 4.5 L V8 | SIL; 6 | SPA; 3 | LMS; Ret | NÜR; Ret | MEX; Ret | COA; Ret | FUJ; 7 | **SHA**; 9 | BHR; 10 | 17th | 33 |
| 2017 | Signatech Alpine Matmut | LMP2 | Alpine A470 | Gibson GK428 4.2 L V8 | SIL; 4 | SPA; 5 | LMS; 5 | NÜR; 3 | | | | | | 7th | 100 |
| 2017 | CEFC Manor TRS Racing | LMP2 | Oreca 07 | Gibson GK428 4.2 L V8 | | | | | MEX; 3 | COA; 6 | FUJ; 5 | SHA; 9 | BHR; 6 | 7th | 100 |

=== Complete 24 Hours of Le Mans results ===
| Year | Team | Co-Drivers | Car | Class | Laps | Pos. | Class Pos. |
|---|---|---|---|---|---|---|---|
| 2016 | (United Kingdom) Manor | (Thailand) Tor Graves (Spain) Roberto Merhi | Oreca 05-Nissan | LMP2 | 283 | DNF | DNF |
| 2017 | (France) Signatech Alpine Matmut | (France) Romain Dumas (United States) Gustavo Menezes | Alpine A470-Gibson | LMP2 | 351 | 10th | 8th |
