= Signatech =

French motor racing team

(France) Signatech
- Founded: 1990
- Base: Bourges, France
- Team principal(s): Philippe Sinault
- Current series: FIA World Endurance Championship
- Former series: Formula 3 Euro Series; French Formula Three; FR 2.0 France; European Le Mans Series; European Formula 3
- Current drivers: (France) Paul-Loup Chatin (France) Jules Gounon (Austria) Ferdinand Habsburg (France) Charles Milesi (Germany) Mick Schumacher (France) Frédéric Makowiecki
- Teams' Championships: Formula 3 Euro Series: 2010; European Le Mans Series: 2013, 2014; FIA World Endurance Championship: 2016, 2018–19
- Drivers' Championships: Formula 3 Euro Series: 2010: Edoardo Mortara; European Le Mans Series: 2013: Pierre Ragues, Nelson Panciatici; 2014: Paul-Loup Chatin, Nelson Panciatici, Oliver Webb

Signatech, currently competing as the Alpine Endurance Team, is a French auto racing team and racing car constructor that competes in the FIA World Endurance Championship. Signatech has been a long-term partner for Alpine since 2013, and has been responsible for running their Le Mans Prototype race cars in the WEC, most notably in the LMP2 class and more recently stepping up to the Le Mans Hypercar class with Alpine's A424 sports prototype. Alpine purchased a stake in Signatech in 2024.

== Racing history ==
Alpine Endurance Team Logo

The team won the FIA European Formula Three Cup in 1999 with Benoît Tréluyer. It won the French Formula Three Championship in 2000 with Jonathan Cochet as driver, who also won the European Cup and Masters of Formula 3 that year, and won the Korea Super Prix for the team in 2001. In 2002, Renaud Derlot won the European F3 Cup for the team.

In 2003, Signature won the team championship in the first Formula Renault V6 Eurocup, with Tristan Gommendy and Kosuke Matsuura as drivers. They moved from the defunct French F3 series to its replacement, the Formula 3 Euro Series, and Nicolas Lapierre and Fabio Carbone completed a 1–2 finish for the team at the prestigious Macau Grand Prix. Edoardo Mortara and Jean-Karl Vernay repeated this feat in 2009. The team began competing in the 2009 European Le Mans Series in the LMP1 category.

The 2010 season was an outstanding one for Signature in the F3 Euroseries with Edoardo Mortara and Marco Wittmann finishing first and second in the series, winning eight races between them, and also taking the team championship.

Signatech provided the chassis for the Formula Future Fiat, a junior formula racing series in Brazil held in 2010 and 2011.

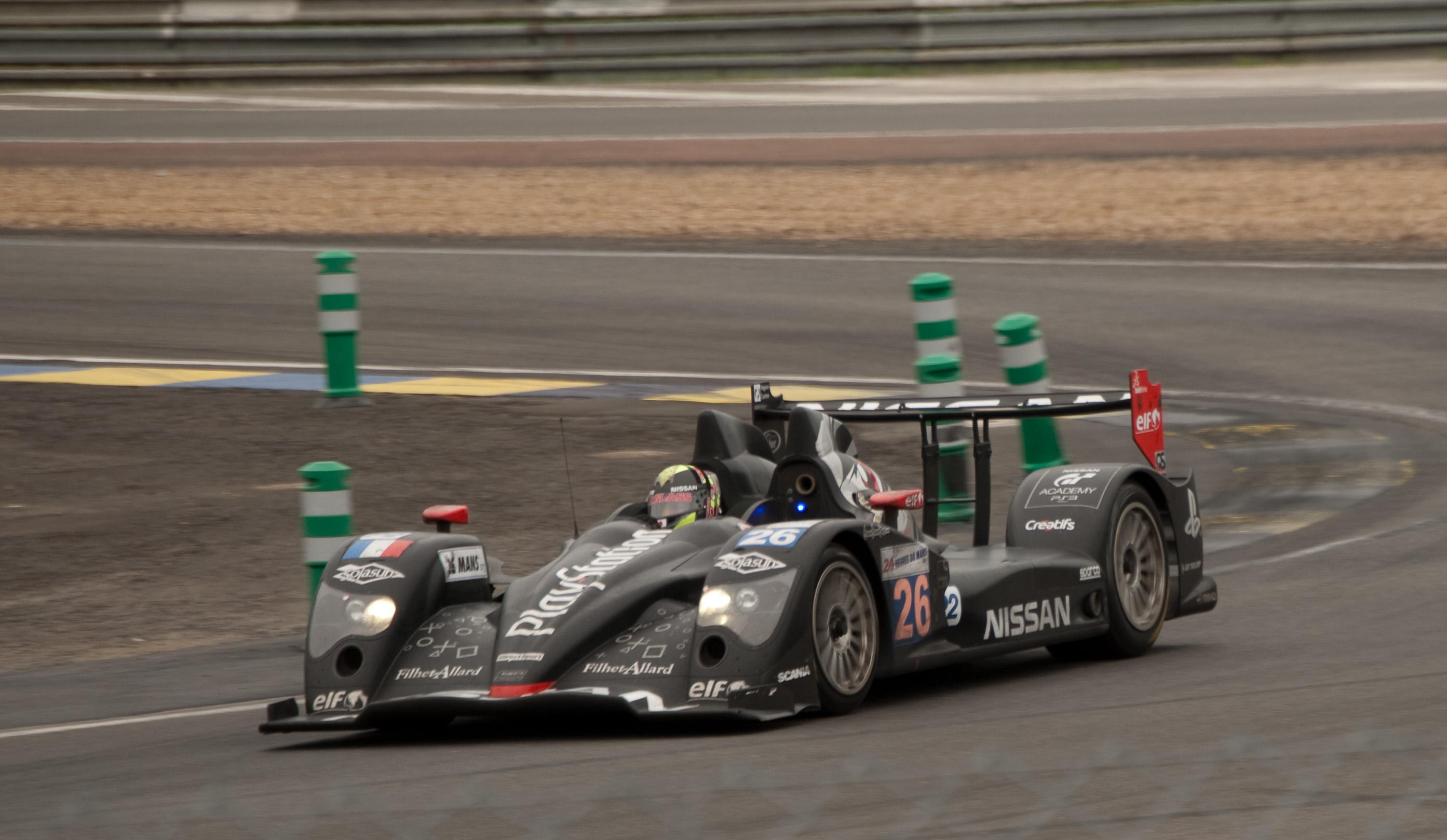
Signatech Nissan at the 2011 24 Hours of Le Mans

In 2011, in cooperation with the Nissan GT Academy, Signatech finished second in LMP2 at the 24 Hours of Le Mans.

In 2012, Signature decided to pull out of the Formula 3 Euro Series, to concentrate on its involvement in sport car races.

The team finished tenth overall at the 2012 24 Hours of Le Mans using a Nissan-powered Oreca 03.

In 2013, Alpine partnered with Signatech to run an LMP2 car in the European Le Mans Series with French drivers Pierre Ragues and Nelson Panciatici. Signatech won the LMP2 Team's and Driver's championships.

In 2014, Signatech delivered chassis for the Formula 4 Sudamericana.

In 2015, Signatech, continuing its partnership with Alpine, returned to the FIA World Endurance Championship, winning the championship LMP2 category in 2016 and 2018–19.

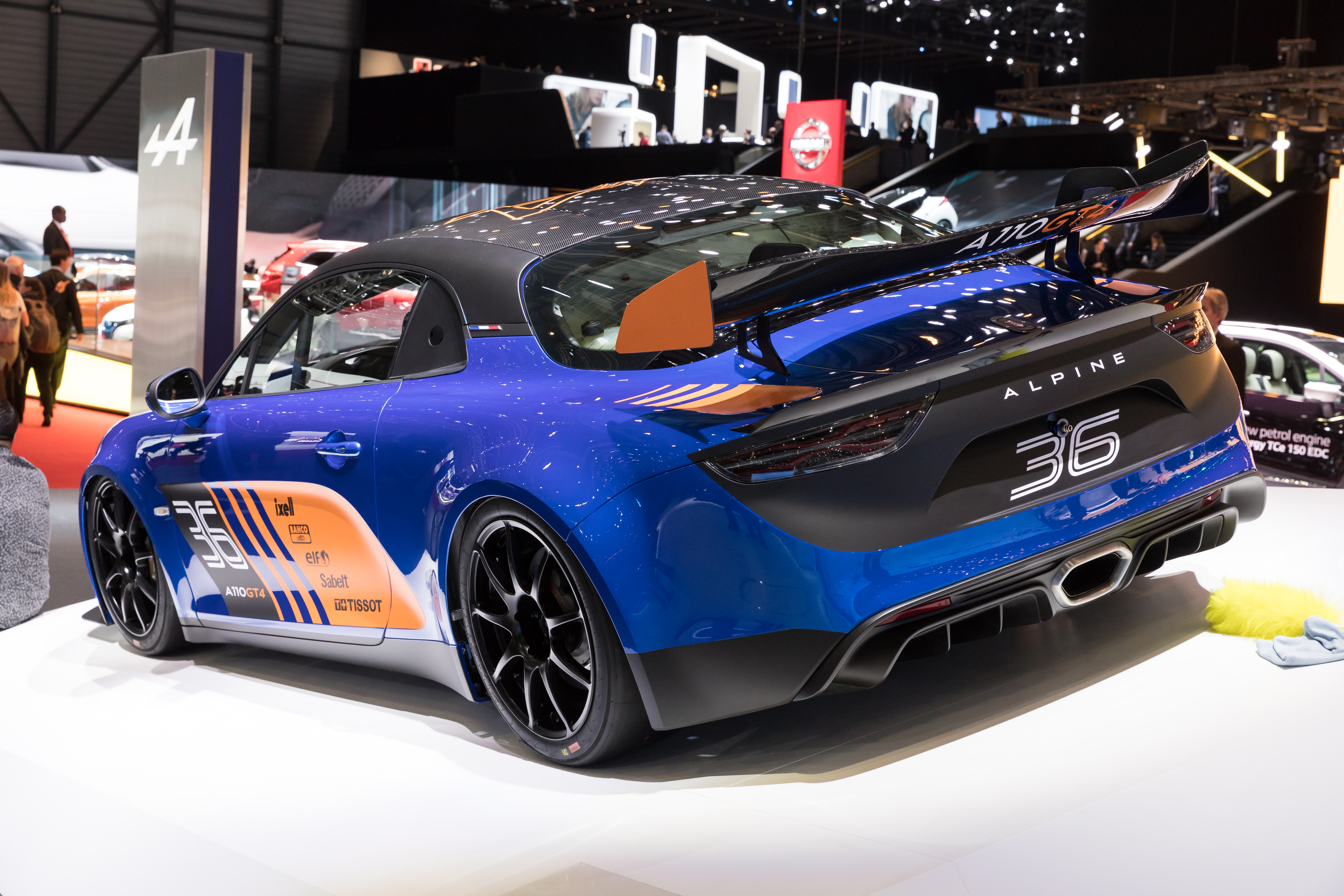
The Alpine A110 GT4 is built by Signatech for Alpine

In 2020, Signatech returned to the European Le Mans Series under the name of Richard Mille Racing Team. The team previously planned to run an all-female lineup of Tatiana Calderón, Katherine Legge and Sophia Flörsch, however, due to Legge's injury, she was then replaced by André Negrão for the first two rounds. Beitske Visser would then take over Legge's place for the rest of the season. The team would then join the LMP2 class of the 2021 FIA World Endurance Championship, with an all-female lineup of Tatiana Calderón, Beitske Visser and Sophia Flörsch.

Signatech's Alpine A480 at the 2022 24 Hours of Le Mans

In 2021, the team partnered again with Alpine, this time fielding a "grandfathered" Rebellion R13 in the Le Mans Hypercar class for the 2021 FIA World Endurance Championship season, which finished third overall at the 2021 24 Hours of Le Mans. The team continued with this lineup in 2022. For 2023, Signatech returned to the LMP2 category with two Oreca 07s;

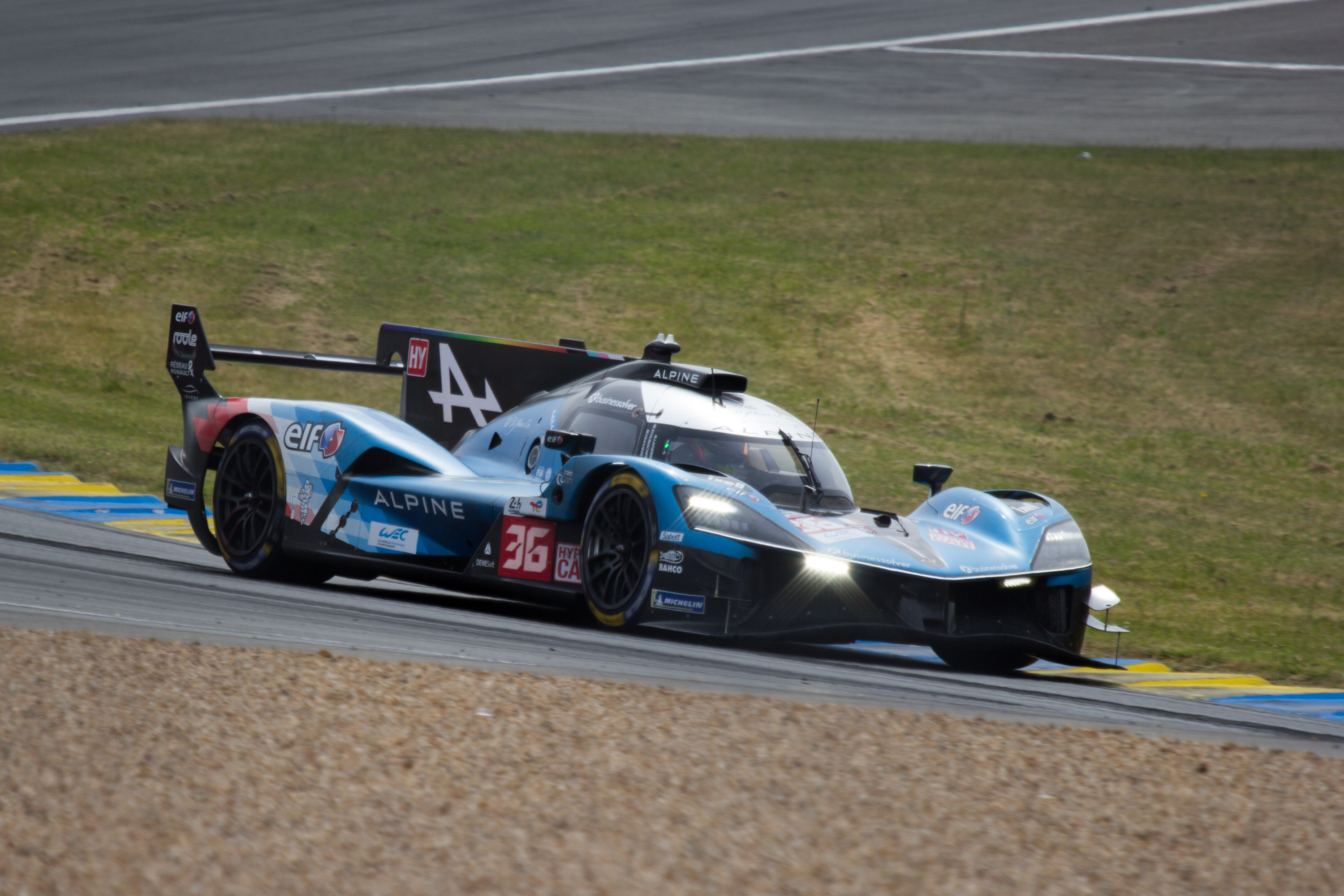
The No. 36 A424 being driven at the 2024 24 Hours of Le Mans

They returned to the top class of the World Endurance Championship in 2024 with two Alpine A424s. The French manufacturer managed a fourth place in the standings, with the highlight being a third-place finish in the 6 Hours of Fuji.

== Racing record ==
=== 24 Hours of Le Mans results ===
Year	Entrant	No.	Car	Drivers	Class	Laps	Pos.	Class Pos.
2009	(France) Signature Plus	12	Courage-Oreca LC70E-Judd	(France) Didier André (France) Franck Mailleux (France) Pierre Ragues	LMP1	344	11th	10th
2010	(France) Signature Plus	008	Lola-Aston Martin B09/60	(Belgium) Vanina Ickx (France) Franck Mailleux (France) Pierre Ragues	LMP1	302	DNF	DNF
2011	(France) Signatech Nissan	26	Oreca 03-Nissan	(France) Soheil Ayari (France) Franck Mailleux (Spain) Lucas Ordóñez	LMP2	320	9th	2nd
2012	(France) Signatech Nissan	23	Oreca 03-Nissan	(France) Olivier Lombard (France) Franck Mailleux (France) Jordan Tresson	LMP2	340	16th	9th
2012	(France) Signatech Nissan	26	Oreca 03-Nissan	(France) Nelson Panciatici (France) Pierre Ragues (Russia) Roman Rusinov	LMP2	351	10th	4th
2013	(France) Signatech Alpine	36	Alpine A450-Nissan	(France) Tristan Gommendy (France) Nelson Panciatici (France) Pierre Ragues	LMP2	317	14th	8th
2014	(France) Signatech Alpine	36	Alpine A450b-Nissan	(France) Paul-Loup Chatin (France) Nelson Panciatici (United Kingdom) Oliver Webb	LMP2	355	7th	3rd
2015	(France) Signatech Alpine	36	Alpine A450b-Nissan	(France) Vincent Capillaire (France) Paul-Loup Chatin (France) Nelson Panciatici	LMP2	110	DNF	DNF
2016	(China) Baxi DC Racing Alpine	35	Alpine A460-Nissan	(United States) David Cheng (France) Nelson Panciatici (China) Ho-Pin Tung	LMP2	234	DNF	DNF
2016	(France) Signatech Alpine	36	Alpine A460-Nissan	(France) Nicolas Lapierre (United States) Gustavo Menezes (Monaco) Stéphane Richelmi	LMP2	357	5th	1st
2017	(France) Signatech Alpine Matmut	35	Alpine A470-Gibson	(Brazil) André Negrão (France) Nelson Panciatici (France) Pierre Ragues	LMP2	362	4th	3rd
2017	(France) Signatech Alpine Matmut	36	Alpine A470-Gibson	(France) Romain Dumas (United States) Gustavo Menezes (United Kingdom) Matt Rao	LMP2	351	10th	8th
2018	(France) Signatech Alpine Matmut	36	Alpine A470-Gibson	(France) Nicolas Lapierre (Brazil) André Negrão (France) Pierre Thiriet	LMP2	367	5th	1st
2019	(France) Signatech Alpine Matmut	36	Alpine A470-Gibson	(France) Nicolas Lapierre (Brazil) André Negrão (France) Pierre Thiriet	LMP2	368	6th	1st
2020	(France) Signatech Alpine Elf	36	Alpine A470-Gibson	(France) Thomas Laurent (Brazil) André Negrão (France) Pierre Ragues	LMP2	367	8th	4th
2020	(France) Richard Mille Racing Team	50	Oreca 07-Gibson	(Colombia) Tatiana Calderón (Germany) Sophia Flörsch (Netherlands) Beitske Visser	LMP2	364	13th	9th
2021	(France) Alpine Elf Matmut	36	Alpine A480-Gibson	(France) Nicolas Lapierre (Brazil) André Negrão (France) Matthieu Vaxivière	Hypercar	367	3rd	3rd
2021	(France) Richard Mille Racing Team	1	Oreca 07-Gibson	(Colombia) Tatiana Calderón (Germany) Sophia Flörsch (Netherlands) Beitske Visser	LMP2	74	DNF	DNF
2022	(France) Alpine Elf Team	36	Alpine A480-Gibson	(France) Nicolas Lapierre (Brazil) André Negrão (France) Matthieu Vaxivière	Hypercar	362	23rd	5th
2022	(France) Richard Mille Racing Team	1	Oreca 07-Gibson	(France) Charles Milesi (France) Sébastien Ogier (France) Lilou Wadoux	LMP2	366	13th	9th
2023	(France) Alpine Elf Team	35	Oreca 07-Gibson	(United Kingdom) Olli Caldwell (Brazil) André Negrão (Mexico) Memo Rojas	LMP2	322	19th	9th
2023	(France) Alpine Elf Team	36	Oreca 07-Gibson	(France) Julien Canal (France) Charles Milesi (France) Matthieu Vaxivière	LMP2	327	12th	4th
2024	(France) Alpine Endurance Team	35	Alpine A424	(France) Paul-Loup Chatin (Austria) Ferdinand Habsburg (France) Charles Milesi	Hypercar	75	DNF	DNF
2024	(France) Alpine Endurance Team	36	Alpine A424	(France) Nicolas Lapierre (Germany) Mick Schumacher (France) Matthieu Vaxivière	Hypercar	88	DNF	DNF
2025	(France) Alpine Endurance Team	35	Alpine A424	(France) Paul-Loup Chatin (Austria) Ferdinand Habsburg (France) Charles Milesi	Hypercar	385	9th	9th
2025	(France) Alpine Endurance Team	36	Alpine A424	(France) Jules Gounon (France) Frédéric Makowiecki (Germany) Mick Schumacher	Hypercar	384	10th	10th
2026	(France) Alpine Endurance Team	35	Alpine A424	(Portugal) António Félix da Costa (Austria) Ferdinand Habsburg (France) Charles Milesi	Hypercar	381	6th	6th
2026	(France) Alpine Endurance Team	36	Alpine A424	(France) Jules Gounon (France) Frédéric Makowiecki (France) Victor Martins	Hypercar	379	10th	10th

=== Complete FIA World Endurance Championship Results ===
Year	Entrant	Class	No	Chassis	Engine	Drivers	Rounds									Pos.	Pts
Year	Entrant	Class	No	Chassis	Engine	Drivers	1	2	3	4	5	6	7	8	9	Pos.	Pts
2012							SEB	SPA	LMS	SIL	SÃO	BHR	FUJ	SHA			
2012	(France) Signatech-Nissan	LMP2	23	Oreca 03	Nissan VK45DE 4.5 L V8	(France) Olivier Lombard (France) Franck Mailleux (France) Jordan Tresson	4	13	9	Ret	Ret	2	8	5		6th	60
2012	(France) Signatech-Nissan	LMP2	26	Oreca 03	Nissan VK45DE 4.5 L V8	(France) Pierre Ragues (France) Nelson Panciatici (Russia) Roman Rusinov		12	4	3	7	5	EX	7		6th	60
2015							SIL	SPA	LMS	NÜR	COA	FUJ	SHA	BHR			
2015	(France) Signatech Alpine	LMP2	36	Alpine A450b	Nissan VK45DE 4.5 L V8	(France) Nelson Panciatici (France) Paul-Loup Chatin (France) Vincent Capillaire (France) Tom Dillmann	Ret	4	Ret	5	6	2	1	4		4th	86
2016							SIL	SPA	LMS	NÜR	MEX	COA	FUJ	SHA	BHR		
2016	(France) Signatech Alpine	LMP2	36	Alpine A460	Nissan VK45DE 4.5 L V8	(United States) Gustavo Menezes (France) Nicolas Lapierre (Monaco) Stéphane Richelmi	4	1	1	1	2	1	3	4	3	1st	199
2017							SIL	SPA	LMS	NÜR	MEX	COA	FUJ	SHA	BHR		
2017	(France) Signatech Alpine Matmut	LMP2	35	Alpine A470	Gibson GK428 4.2 L V8	(France) Nelson Panciatici (France) Pierre Ragues (Brazil) André Negrão		6	3	Ret						10th	38
2017	(France) Signatech Alpine Matmut	LMP2	36	Alpine A470	Gibson GK428 4.2 L V8	(United States) Gustavo Menezes (United Kingdom) Matt Rao (France) Nicolas Lapierre (France) Romain Dumas (Brazil) André Negrão	4	5	5	3	2	1	2	2	4	3rd	151
2018-19							SPA	LMS	SIL	FUJ	SHA	SEB	SPA	LMS			
2018-19	(France) Signatech Alpine Matmut	LMP2	36	Alpine A470	Gibson GK428 4.2 L V8	(France) Nicolas Lapierre (Brazil) André Negrão (France) Pierre Thiriet	2	1	3	3	3	2	2	1		1st	181
2019-20							SIL	FUJ	SHA	BHR	COA	SPA	LMS	BHR			
2019-20	(France) Signatech Alpine Elf	LMP2	36	Alpine A470	Gibson GK428 4.2 L V8	(France) Thomas Laurent (Brazil) André Negrão (France) Pierre Ragues	2	6	4	4	6	Ret	3	5		5th	109
2021							SPA	POR	MON	LMN	BHR	BHR					
2021	(France) Alpine Elf Matmut	Hypercar	36	Alpine A480	Gibson GL458 4.5 L V8	(France) Nicolas Lapierre (Brazil) André Negrão (France) Matthieu Vaxivière	2	3	2	3	3	3				2nd	128
2021	(France) Richard Mille Racing Team	LMP2	1	Oreca 07	Gibson GK428 4.2 L V8	(Germany) Sophia Flörsch (Colombia) Tatiana Calderón (Netherlands) Beitske Visser (France) Gabriel Aubry	8	6	8	Ret	6	9				9th	31
2022							SEB	SPA	LMN	MON	FUJ	BHR					
2022	(France) Alpine Elf Team	Hypercar	36	Alpine A480	Gibson GL458 4.5 L V8	(France) Nicolas Lapierre (Brazil) André Negrão (France) Matthieu Vaxivière	1	2	5	1	3	3				2nd	144
2022	(France) Richard Mille Racing Team	LMP2	1	Oreca 07	Gibson GK428 4.2 L V8	(France) Charles Milesi (France) Lilou Wadoux (France) Sébastien Ogier (France) Paul-Loup Chatin	12	8	6	14	8	8				9th	30
2023							SEB	POR	SPA	LMS	MZA	FUJ	BHR				
2023	(France) Alpine Elf Team	LMP2	35	Oreca 07	Gibson GK428 4.2 L V8	(United Kingdom) Olli Caldwell (Brazil) André Negrão (Mexico) Memo Rojas	Ret	10	8	7	8	11	10			11th	23
2023	(France) Alpine Elf Team	LMP2	36	Oreca 07	Gibson GK428 4.2 L V8	(France) Julien Canal (France) Charles Milesi (France) Matthieu Vaxivière	8	8	7	3	2	5	7			7th	83
2024							QAT	IMO	SPA	LMN	SÃO	COA	FUJ	BHR			
2024	(France) Alpine Endurance Team	Hypercar	35	Alpine A424	Alpine V634 3.4 L Turbo V6	(France) Paul-Loup Chatin (Austria) Ferdinand Habsburg (France) Jules Gounon (France) Charles Milesi	7	13	9	Ret	12	5	7	4		4th	70
2024	(France) Alpine Endurance Team	Hypercar	36	Alpine A424	Alpine V634 3.4 L Turbo V6	(France) Charles Milesi (Germany) Mick Schumacher (France) Matthieu Vaxivière (France) Nicolas Lapierre	11	16	12	Ret	10	9	3	9		4th	70
2025							QAT	IMO	SPA	LMN	SÃO	COA	FUJ	BHR			
2025	(France) Alpine Endurance Team	Hypercar	35	Alpine A424	Alpine V634 3.4 L Turbo V6	(France) Paul-Loup Chatin (Austria) Ferdinand Habsburg (France) Charles Milesi	14	13	8	10	18	11	1	11		6th	84
2025	(France) Alpine Endurance Team	Hypercar	36	Alpine A424	Alpine V634 3.4 L Turbo V6	(France) Jules Gounon (France) Frédéric Makowiecki (Germany) Mick Schumacher	13	3	3	11	9	15	14	12		6th	84
2026							IMO	SPA	LMN	SÃO	COA	FUJ	BAR	MON			
2026	(France) Alpine Endurance Team	Hypercar	35	Alpine A424	Alpine V634 3.4 L Turbo V6	(Portugal) António Félix da Costa (Austria) Ferdinand Habsburg (France) Charles Milesi	4	12	6	10	3	4	10	Ret		5th	122
2026	(France) Alpine Endurance Team	Hypercar	36	Alpine A424	Alpine V634 3.4 L Turbo V6	(France) Jules Gounon (France) Frédéric Makowiecki (France) Victor Martins	11	11	9	11	5	2	8	2		5th	122

* Championship ongoing.

== Timeline ==
Current series/events
24 Hours of Le Mans	2009–present
FIA World Endurance Championship	2012, 2015–present
Former series
French Formula Three Championship	1993–2002
French Formula Renault Championship	2000, 2002
Formula Renault V6 Eurocup	2003
Formula 3 Euro Series	2003–2011
Formula Renault 3.5 Series	2008
European Le Mans Series	2009–2010, 2013–2014, 2020
FIA Formula 3 European Championship	2014–2015

Achievements
Preceded by ART Grand Prix	Formula 3 Euro Series Teams' Champion; 2010	Succeeded by Prema Powerteam
