= British Formula 3 International Series =

Auto racing championship in the United Kingdom

- Category: Single seaters
- Country: United Kingdom
- Inaugural season: 1951
- Folded: 2014
- Drivers: 20
- Teams: 6
- Constructors: Dallara
- Engine suppliers: Mercedes HWA; Volkswagen
- Tyre suppliers: Cooper Tires
- Last Drivers' champion: (China) Martin Cao
- Official website: www.formula3.co

The British Formula Three Championship was an international motor racing series that took place primarily in the United Kingdom with a small number of events in mainland Europe. It was a junior-level feeder formula that used small single seater Formula Three chassis. Its final official title was the Cooper Tires British Formula 3 International Series. Notable former champions included Jackie Stewart, Emerson Fittipaldi, Nelson Piquet, Ayrton Senna, Mika Häkkinen, Rubens Barrichello, Takuma Sato, Daniel Ricciardo and Hélio Castroneves.

== History ==
The first Formula Three championship to take place in the UK was the Autosport F3 championship held in 1951, which was won by Eric Brandon. By 1954, it had evolved into a national-level series and was organised by the British Racing and Sports Car Club (BRSCC). This was the 500cc period of Formula Three, which was active in the UK and other countries until 1959, at which point Formula Three was adapted into Formula Junior. In this period, there were often two or three series running concurrently and a single national series had yet to be firmly established.

The FIA reintroduced Formula Three in 1964 using a one-litre engine formula, and there were two F3 championships held in the UK that year. This was not the last occasion of two or more F3 championships running concurrently in the post-1964 era: from 1970 to 1973, there were three regional series (the Lombard North, John Player, and Forward Trust championships) and there were normally two series between then and 1978, with many drivers running in both. From 1979 onwards, there would be a single championship as the BARC and BRDC combined their series into the Vandervell British F3 Championship, which was later renamed for sponsorship reasons to the Marlboro British F3 Championship and then the Lucas British F3 Championship.

In 1974, the engine capacity was raised to two litres, which remained the engine formula all the way until the championship's demise some 40 years later. In 1984, the series adopted a B class for competitors with older chassis, which helped grid sizes to grow rapidly in the 1980s, renamed in 2000 as the Scholarship class and later the National class. In 2004, the organisation of the series was taken over by SRO, which began to run the series alongside the British GT Championship. Five years later, the series declined an invitation to join the support bill of the British Touring Car Championship, which attracted larger crowds than the British F3/GT meetings run by SRO.

However, rising costs in the late 2000s as a result of the arrival of big-spending engine manufacturers such as Mercedes-Benz and Volkswagen and hosting rounds abroad, combined with the revival of an FIA-backed European Formula 3 Championship in 2012, starved the British series of grid numbers, which were down to the mid-teens by 2012. Facing a shortfall of entries in 2013, the calendar was cut from 10 to just four meetings in a bid to save the series. The following year saw the calendar back up to seven meetings, but grids remained small, with some races attracting as few as five cars. In October 2014, it was announced that the 2014 season would be the final season of the British Formula Three Championship after a planned merger with the German Formula Three Championship fell through.

== Equipment ==
Like most Formula Three championships, competitors in British F3 were permitted to use any eligible chassis, but in practice few competitors deviated from the Dallara after the Italian marque's arrival in 1993. Since then, TOM'S, Mygale and Lola have been among those to take on the might of the Italian marque, largely without success. Prior to Dallara's domination, Ralt and Reynard were the pacesetting chassis, with March being the chassis of choice for much of the 1970s.

Two engine manufacturers – AMG-Mercedes (tuned by H.W.A) and Volkswagen – were represented on a full-time basis at the time of the series' demise. The Mugen-Honda engine (tuned by Neil Brown Engineering) was the dominant powerplant of the 1990s and the early-to-mid 2000s, prior to the arrival of Mercedes in 2006, although other manufacturers, including Toyota, Vauxhall/Opel, Renault and Mitsubishi also enjoyed success in the past.

All entrants in the series had to use control tyres from a single supplier. Since 1982, these were manufactured by Avon Tyres, which from the 2009 season onwards were re-branded as Cooper Tires, as Cooper became the championship's official title sponsor.

== See also ==
- European Formula 3 Championship
- Formula 3 Euro Series
