= Trofeo Maserati =

One-make racing series

- Category: One-make racing by Maserati
- Country: International; Middle East; Europe
- Inaugural season: 2003
- Folded: 2015
- Constructors: Maserati
- Tyre suppliers: Pirelli
- Official website: Official website

The Trofeo Maserati was a single-marque motorsport championship that was started by Maserati Corse in 2003, with the introduction of the Maserati Coupé. Its title is commonly confused as Maserati Trofeo, which in fact refers to the name devised for the 4200 Coupé built for the series. However, in recent years Maserati themselves have been very inconsistent regarding the name of the championship, making it hard to define what is officially correct. In this article, the series will be referred to as Trofeo Maserati.

It was very similar to the Ferrari Challenge, although not on such a large scale. The concept is simple: customers purchased or rented a Trofeo car, which is for track use only, registered themselves and their team for a season or race, and competed. Teams were not allowed to tune their engines, but could have adjusted suspension, brakes, etc. Entrants could also have used Maserati in-house teams at an additional cost.

== Series ==
The Maserati Trofeo was a single-make sports car racing championship organized by Maserati from 2003 to 2015. The series marked the brand's official return to competitive motorsport since its original retirement in 1957. Launched at the 2002 Paris Motor Show and debuted at the Autosport International Show in January 2003, the trophy provided a centrally managed "arrive-and-drive" program primarily tailored for gentleman drivers.

Originally, the Trofeo Maserati consisted of only one series, based in Europe. This was until 2010 when the Maserati Granturismo MC (not to be confused with the GranTurismo MC Stradale) was introduced. Today, there are several series. The Trofeo Maserati is regulated by the National Sporting Authority (ASN) of an involved country and FIA. If there is any argument during a race weekend, the ASN has a higher ruling than the FIA.

== History and organization ==
The championship prototype underwent extensive development testing starting in June 2002, with Scuderia Ferrari Formula One drivers including Michael Schumacher, Luciano Burti, and Luca Badoer refining the vehicle at circuits such as Fiorano, Imola, and the Nürburgring. Touring car driver Fabrizio Giovanardi and sports car specialist Fabio Babini also joined the development program for track tests at Imola and Vallelunga. To guarantee absolute technical parity, Maserati centrally prepared, maintained, and operated all 26 grid vehicles directly from the factory, providing identical configurations and sealed engines for the drivers. The championship initially operated as the Trofeo Vodafone Maserati Europa before transitioning through various commercial iterations, including the Trofeo Audemars Piguet Maserati Europa in 2006, which introduced 60-minute endurance formats and regulatory pit stops to intensify competition. Following a hiatus, the series returned in 2010 as the global Maserati Trofeo MC World Series utilizing the GranTurismo platform, expanding to international venues across North America, China, and the Middle East before concluding at the end of the 2015 season.

=== Trofeo Light ===
Developed at the end of 2003 by race preparer Italtecnica to comply with international FIA N-GT regulations, the Trofeo Light was a highly exclusive variant limited to nine produced units. It featured a vastly reduced dry weight of 1,175 kg (2,590 lbs) and an optimized output of 430 bhp. These specialized vehicles actively competed in independent endurance championships, notably securing an 11th-place class finish at the 2004 24 Hours of Daytona with Risi Competizione.

=== Trofeo Worldwide ===
This new season format was introduced in 2010 alongside the new GranTurismo MC. The 2012 calendar encompasses seven events spanning the globe, including circuits in Italy, China, Portugal, France, Spain, and the United States. A new twist made in 2011 is the inauguration of "endurance" events. This gives the season a 3+3 format, with three regular race weekends and three endurance race weekends. The difference is explained below.

=== Trofeo European Series ===
This is a sub series to the Worldwide series which only encompasses the events in Europe, thus keeping the costs down for those who do not wish to bring the car to China and United States. This saves the entrants approximately €40,000 in entry fees alone, but they still compete in 5 of the 7 Worldwide series' events.

Regulations and Event Format

From 2003 to 2005, the racing weekends consisted of Friday practice, Saturday qualifying, and a 45-minute sprint race on Sunday. Mandatory pit stops allowed for driver pairs to swap stints. Competitors were required to manage tire wear carefully, as tire changes during the race were strictly prohibited.

The regular events precede as follows:

- 2 free practice sessions of 45 minutes each.
- 2 qualifying sessions of 20 minutes each.
- 2 races of 38 minutes + 1 lap each.

The endurance events precede as follows:

- 2 free practice sessions of 45 minutes each.
- 2 qualifying sessions of 20 minutes each.
- 2 races of 28 minutes + 1 lap each.
- 1 race of 48 minutes + 1 lap with one mandatory pit stop.

For the 2006 season, Swiss watchmaker Audemars Piguet joined as the title sponsor. To increase on-track competition, Maserati lengthened select feature races to 60-minute mini-endurance events and introduced a success-ballast system involving time penalties or bonus seconds based on prior race results. The standard grid comprised roughly 20 to 22 cars, with professional drivers and high-profile celebrities frequently entering as "VIP" wildcards. Notable guest drivers across the seasons included Formula One veterans Ivan Capelli, Johnny Herbert, and Ralph Firman, alongside television personality Tiff Needell and supermodel Jodie Kidd.

The series operated on a comprehensive "arrive-and-drive" format, where the seasonal entry fee (valued at €130,000 for the 2006 season) covered all logistics, including vehicle preparation, dedicated mechanics, fuel, Pirelli tires, luxury accommodation, and trackside hospitality.

In mid-March, Maserati Corse conducted a promotional and solidarity exhibition at the International Racing Festival in Copenhagen, Denmark. Two GranSport Trofeo cars were utilized for charity passenger rides—driven by Scandinavian drivers and featuring appearances by Prince Joachim and Princess Alexandra of Denmark—raising over €700,000 for UNICEF.

=== Trofeo Middle East ===
The JBF RAK Middle East championship is an unusual race series because it is run during the Northern Hemisphere's winter months. The season starts in November and ends in March. It is run on circuits in Abu Dhabi, Bahrain and Qatar. A season comprises seven events, just like the worldwide series. The Middle East series has yet to adapt the Worldwide Series' 3+3 season format. Technically, since the Worldwide Series ends in November and stars in April, those wishing to can race in the Trofeo-series all-year around. This is one of the only race series in the world which allow this unique possibility, and it is possibly the only GT Racing series.

== Competitors ==
Upon joining the series, entrants can choose to participate in the Trofeo Racing Academy which is Maserati's own racing school. Furthermore, Maserati Corse supply a season package called "fly & drive", this includes full hospitality and technical support at all the events over a season. The per-race cost for the old 4200 Trofeo was approximately $20,000.

Today, entrants can choose to compete in single or multi driver lineups. Those choosing to compete with two drivers effectively split the race weekend 50/50. With the first driver competing in the first race, and the second driver competing in the second race. In recent years this form of competing has become very popular in gentleman GT racing, because the drivers can split the costs.

== Points and classes ==
At the end of each season, the following prizes and titles are awarded. This is universal for all the series.

- Trofeo Assoluto - For all drivers, this is the grand prize and champion title.
- Trofeo Maserati - Awarded to the driver with the most points, using an MC supported by Maserati.
- Trofeo Team - Awarded to the driver/team with the most points running their own car and team. (I.e. not rented or prepared by Maserati Corse)
- Trofeo over 50 - Awarded to the driver who is 50 years old or more with the most points.
- Trofeo under 30 - Awarded to the driver under 30 years old with the most points. This is to promote juniors competing in the series.
- Prize Pole Position - Awarded to the driver who has taken the highest number of pole positions throughout the season.

=== Points ===
Regular Race

Position	1st	2nd	3rd	4th	5th	6th	7th	8th	9th	10th
Points	20	15	12	10	8	6	4	3	2	1

Endurance Race

Position	1st	2nd	3rd	4th	5th	6th	7th	8th	9th	10th
Points	25	18	15	12	10	8	6	4	2	1

== Cars ==
The Trofeo is and has always been single model championship, older models are not eligible for entry. The only model eligible is the one that Maserati is currently manufacturing and racing. This means that the Coupé-based Trofeo became ineligible to race at the arrival of the MC. Some of these were known as "Trofeo Lights" and primarily raced in FIA GT3. Maserati did for a short time produce Maserati 3200 GT Trofeo's, and were used for cup-style racing.

The trophy initially utilized the Maserati Coupe (GT 4200) before transitioning to the Maserati GranSport in later seasons. Pakelo served as the primary sponsor from 2003 to 2006, developing a bespoke 75w110 transmission fluid specifically tailored for the cars' electro-actuated "Cambiocorsa" gearboxes. The race car, based on the standard road-going GranSport, featured lightened bodywork via a redesigned undertray, front splitters and a 40% larger rear wing for better aerodynamics, and a 4.2L V8 engine developing 425 bhp at 7,200 rpm with the rev limiter raised to 8,000 rpm. It retained the 6-speed electro-actuated Cambiocorsa F1-type paddle-shift gearbox, featuring a specialized Sport-mode shift speed of 150 milliseconds.

For each event Maserati supplies two spare cars. These may only be used by the drivers if there is a major technical failure or irreparable damage due to an accident.

=== GranTurismo MC ===
First released in 2010, all new MC's are delivered race prepared by Maserati technicians. Entrants who use private teams must have their cars homologated to meet the equal settings of the in-house raced MC's. It features aerodynamic enhancements and weight reduction over the GranTurismo S which it was originally based upon. It has a base price of €155-158.000 excl. VAT, but includes technical support throughout the initial season. The MC can also be run in all GT4 class racing series. It has around 488 bhp and gearchanges are dealt with in 60 ms. For 2012 the MC has a revised aero package encompassing amongst other minor changes a large rear wing.

== Technical specifications ==
The championship utilized custom factory racing variants adapted from Maserati's standard production models:

- Maserati Coupé Trofeo (2003–2004): Derived from the Coupé Cambiocorsa. It featured a stripped interior reducing weight by over 210 kg (460 lbs) down to 1,370 kg (3,014 lbs), paired with an upgraded braking unit and a 4.2-liter V8 engine developing 413 bhp at 7,000 rpm. Technical development included partnerships with Pakelo for specialized Cambiocorsa transmission lubricants and Pirelli as the sole tyre provider.
- Maserati GranSport Trofeo (2005–2006): Based on the production GranSport. It implemented highly improved aerodynamics with a revised front splitter and a 40 percent larger rear wing. The engine layout pushed power to 425 bhp at 7,200 rpm with a raised rev limiter of 8,000 rpm, achieving a top speed exceeding 290 km/h (180 mph). Following the conclusion of the sponsorship with Pakelo at the end of 2006, Agip was supplying the teams with fuel.
- Maserati GranTurismo MC Trofeo (2010–2015): Introduced for the World Series era, featuring a 4.7-liter V8 engine delivering approximately 488 bhp, supported by Shell as the primary global technical fluid partner.

== Champions ==
The championship awarded the Trofeo Assoluto (Absolute Trophy) to the overall highest-scoring driver at the end of each competitive season. From 2003 to 2006, the series was contested primarily across major European racing circuits before going on a three-year hiatus. The series returned in 2010 as a global championship, expanding its calendar to include rounds in North America, Asia, and the Middle East before officially concluding at the end of 2015.

=== By season ===
Year	Series Name	Champion	Car
2015	Maserati Trofeo MC World Series	(France) Romain Monti	Maserati GranTurismo MC Trofeo
2014	Maserati Trofeo MC World Series	(Switzerland) Mauro Calamia	Maserati GranTurismo MC Trofeo
2013	Maserati Trofeo MC World Series	(Belgium) Renaud Kuppens	Maserati GranTurismo MC Trofeo
2012	Maserati Trofeo MC World Series	(Belgium) Renaud Kuppens	Maserati GranTurismo MC Trofeo
2011	Maserati Trofeo MC World Series	(Italy) David Baldi	Maserati GranTurismo MC Trofeo
2010	Maserati Trofeo MC World Series	(Italy) Pietro Zumerle	Maserati GranTurismo MC Trofeo
2007–2009: Series not held
2006	Trofeo Audemars Piguet Maserati Europa	(Italy) Maurizio Fabris	Maserati GranSport Trofeo
2005	Trofeo Vodafone Maserati Europa	(Italy) Alberto Cerrai	Maserati GranSport Trofeo
2004	Trofeo Vodafone Maserati Europa	(Italy) Andrea Palma	Maserati Coupé Cambiocorsa Trofeo
2003	Trofeo Vodafone Maserati Europa	(Italy) Emanuele Smurra	Maserati Coupé Cambiocorsa Trofeo

=== By nationality ===
Country	Total Titles	Drivers	Winning Years
ITA	6	6	2003, 2004, 2005, 2006, 2010, 2011
BEL	2	1	2012, 2013
FRA	1	1	2015
SUI	1	1	2014

== See also ==
- Ferrari Challenge
- Porsche Supercup
- Lamborghini Super Trofeo
