= Protyre =

Coordinates: 51°10′54″N 1°15′39″W

Micheldever Tyre & Auto Services Limited, trading as Protyre
- Company type: Private
- Industry: Tyres and Servicing
- Founded: 1972
- Headquarters: Micheldever, Winchester, Hampshire, England
- Key people: Graham Mitchell, CEO
- Number of employees: 2400+
- Parent: Sumitomo Rubber Industries
- Website: protyre.co.uk

Micheldever Tyre Services Ltd, trading as Protyre, is primarily focused on the fast fitting of motor vehicles, specialising in tyres, brakes, exhausts and batteries. It also caters for MOT testing & servicing and air conditioning. The Protyre brand spawned from Micheldever Tyre and Auto Services Limited and in 2006 was acquired by venture capitalists, Graphite Capital and Royal Bank of Scotland. It was sold to Sumitomo Rubber Industries in January 2017.

== History ==
Micheldever Tyre Services Ltd was founded in 1972 by Tony Todd starting in a farm building off the A303 before moving a mile or so to the site at Micheldever Station (two miles to the north of Micheldever, Hampshire) which is now the headquarters for the company. It expanded to employ a work force of approximately 1,000. Following a buy out from Graphite Capital and Royal Bank of Scotland, it remained profitable and continued to expand. As well as retail, it operates a wholesale division, which supplies in excess of 6 million tyres a year to its 2,500 plus wholesale customers. Previous owner Tony Todd, since selling the company in 2006, was ranked 782nd in the Times Rich List, 2011.

As at November 2023 Protyre operates more than 180 branches across the UK.

== Ownership ==
Micheldever Tyre Services Ltd, trading as Protyre was founded by Tony Todd and run by him until 2006, when it was acquired by Graphite Capital and Royal Bank of Scotland.

In January 2017, Micheldever Tyre Services (MTS) was sold to Sumitomo Rubber Industries for £215 million.
