= Barnicoat =

Barnicoat is a surname. Notable people with the surname include:

- Ben Barnicoat (born 1996), British racing driver
- Constance Barnicoat (1872–1922), New Zealand secretary, interpreter, mountaineer and journalist
- John Barnicoat (1814–1905), New Zealand civil engineer, surveyor and politician
- Will Barnicoat (born 2003), British track and field athlete and cross country runner
- William Barnicoat (born 1932), English cricketer

== See also ==
- S. H. Barnicoat Monuments in Quincy, Massachusetts
