= Formula One drivers from Brazil =

List of Formula One drivers who competed as Brazilian

- Drivers: 34
- Grands Prix: 848
- Entries: 2005
- Starts: 1888
- Best season finish: 1st (8 times, 1972, 1974, 1981, 1983, 1987, 1988, 1990, 1991)
- Wins: 101
- Podiums: 293
- Pole positions: 126
- Fastest laps: 88
- Points: 3456 (Note: 2 points more than what's shown on StatsF1, since Nano da Silva Ramos is incorrectly listed there as racing under French license while he was actually racing under Brazilian license.)
- First entry: 1951 Italian Grand Prix
- First win: 1970 United States Grand Prix
- Latest win: 2009 Italian Grand Prix
- Latest entry: 2026 Las Vegas Grand Prix
- 2026 drivers: Gabriel Bortoleto; Rafael Câmara

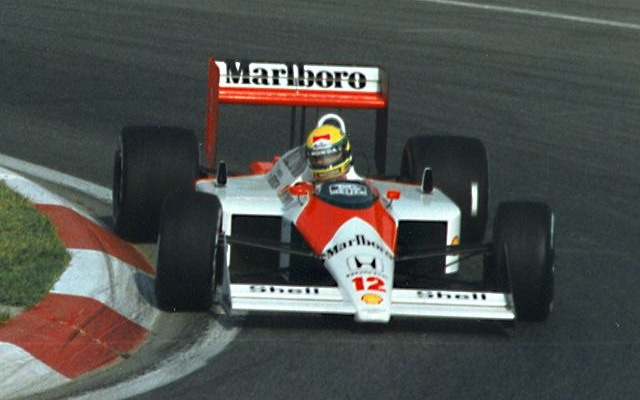
Ayrton Senna in his 1988 McLaren

There have been 34 Formula One drivers who have represented Brazil, including three world champions. Ayrton Senna, the three-time title winner, is regarded as one of the greatest drivers in the history of Formula One. Nelson Piquet also won the title three times and Emerson Fittipaldi was a two-time winner. Rubens Barrichello, who used to hold the record for the most races contested with 322 starts, finished as the championship runner-up in two seasons. Following the retirement of Felipe Massa after the 2017 season, in 2018 there were no Brazilian drivers entered for the World Championship, the first time this had occurred since 1969. Gabriel Bortoleto joined Sauber, which was acquired by Audi in January 2025, for the 2025 season, becoming the 33rd Brazilian Formula One driver after four seasons' absence of Brazilian drivers. Bortoleto is contracted to retain his place at Audi in 2026. Rafael Câmara is contracted to drive for Haas for 2027, but his debut was brought forward to the 2026 São Paulo Grand Prix after regular-season driver Esteban Ocon was dropped during the season, becoming the 34th Brazilian Formula One driver in doing so.

== World champions and race winners ==
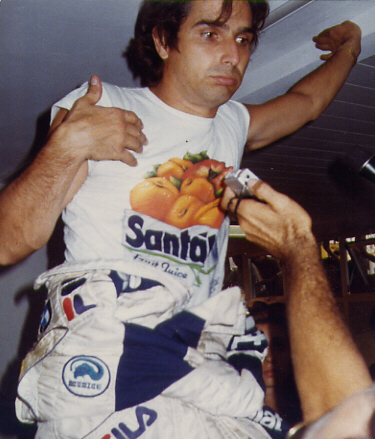
Piquet at Monza in 1983

Brazil produced three world champions, all of whom won more than once. Emerson Fittipaldi was the first Brazilian to secure the Drivers' Championship, winning in 1972 and 1974. Nelson Piquet managed one better, winning the championship three times in the 1980s and became the first Brazilian triple world champion. In 1991, 31-year-old Ayrton Senna won his third title, making him the youngest ever three-time world champion at that time.

Six Brazilian drivers won at least one Grand Prix, with a combined total of 101 wins. Ayrton Senna has won the most races with 41 victories, while Nelson Piquet won 23 out of 204 race starts. Fittipaldi, Rubens Barrichello, and Felipe Massa have each claimed more than ten wins. Carlos Pace scored his only victory at the 1975 Brazilian Grand Prix. Emerson Fittipaldi was the first Brazilian to win a Formula One Grand Prix – the 1970 United States Grand Prix at the Watkins Glen Grand Prix Race Course.

No Brazilian driver has won a Grand Prix since Barrichello's last win at the 2009 Italian Grand Prix, the country's longest barren run since Fittipaldi's maiden victory.

List of Brazilian Formula One World Champions
Name	Years of titles
Emerson Fittipaldi	1972, 1974
Nelson Piquet	1981, 1983, 1987
Ayrton Senna	1988, 1990, 1991

== Current drivers ==
Gabriel Bortoleto joined Sauber for the 2025 season and remained with the team as it rebranded to Audi in 2026. Rafael Câmara is due to make his debut at the 2026 São Paulo Grand Prix driving for Haas. Câmara had been due to replace Ocon from the start of the 2027 season, but made his debut early after Ocon was dropped part way through the 2026 season. Pietro Fittipaldi served as a development driver for the Cadillac F1 Team during the 2026 season.

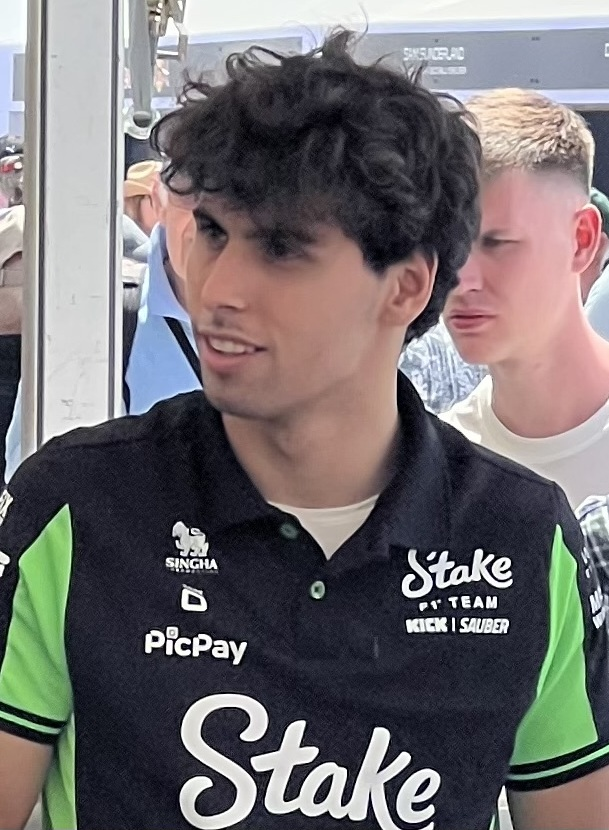
Gabriel Bortoleto
2026 season position: 14th

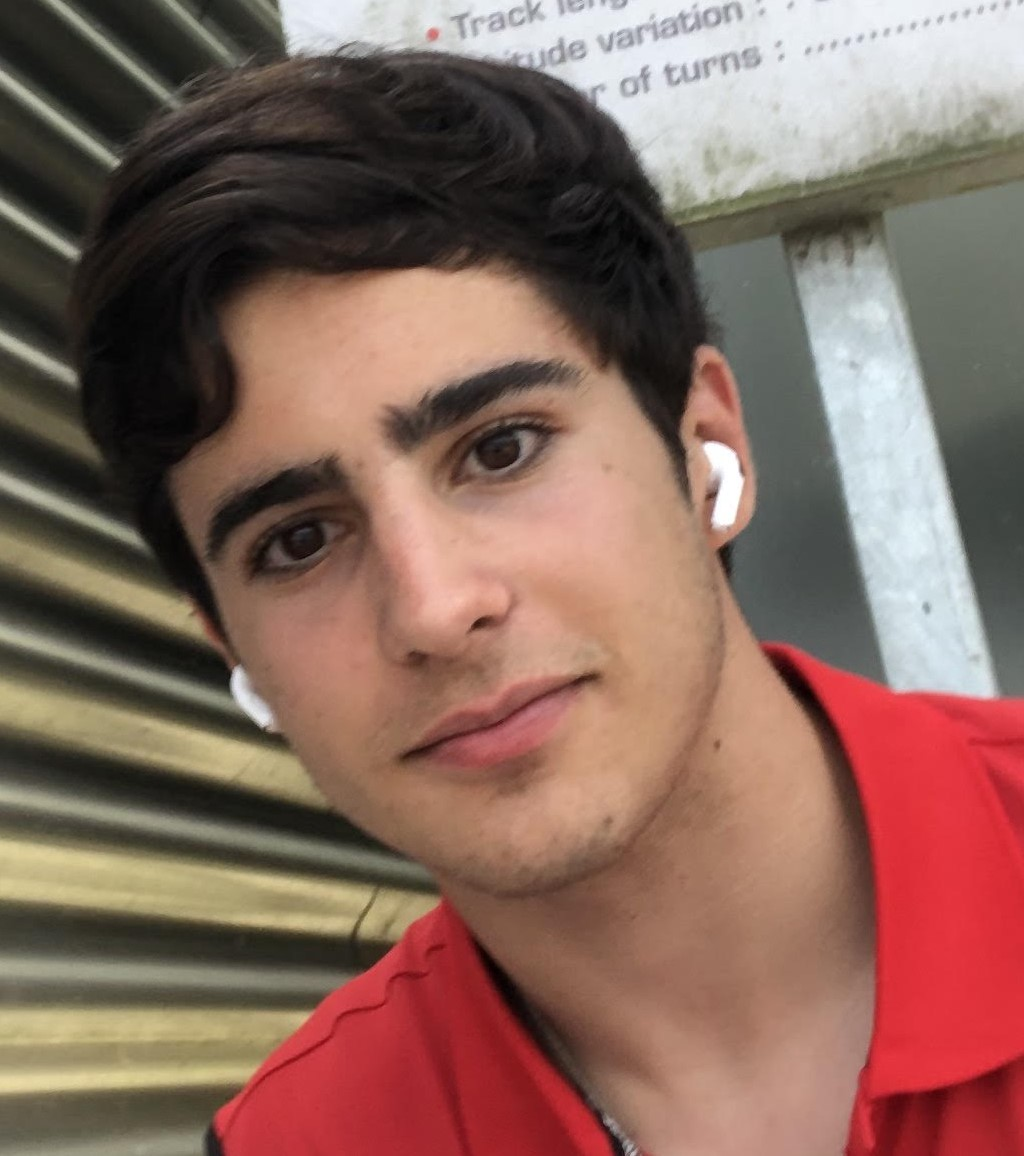
Rafael Câmara

== Former drivers ==
=== Notable former drivers ===
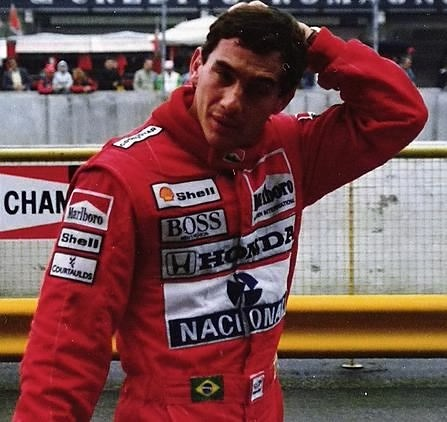
Ayrton Senna in 1989

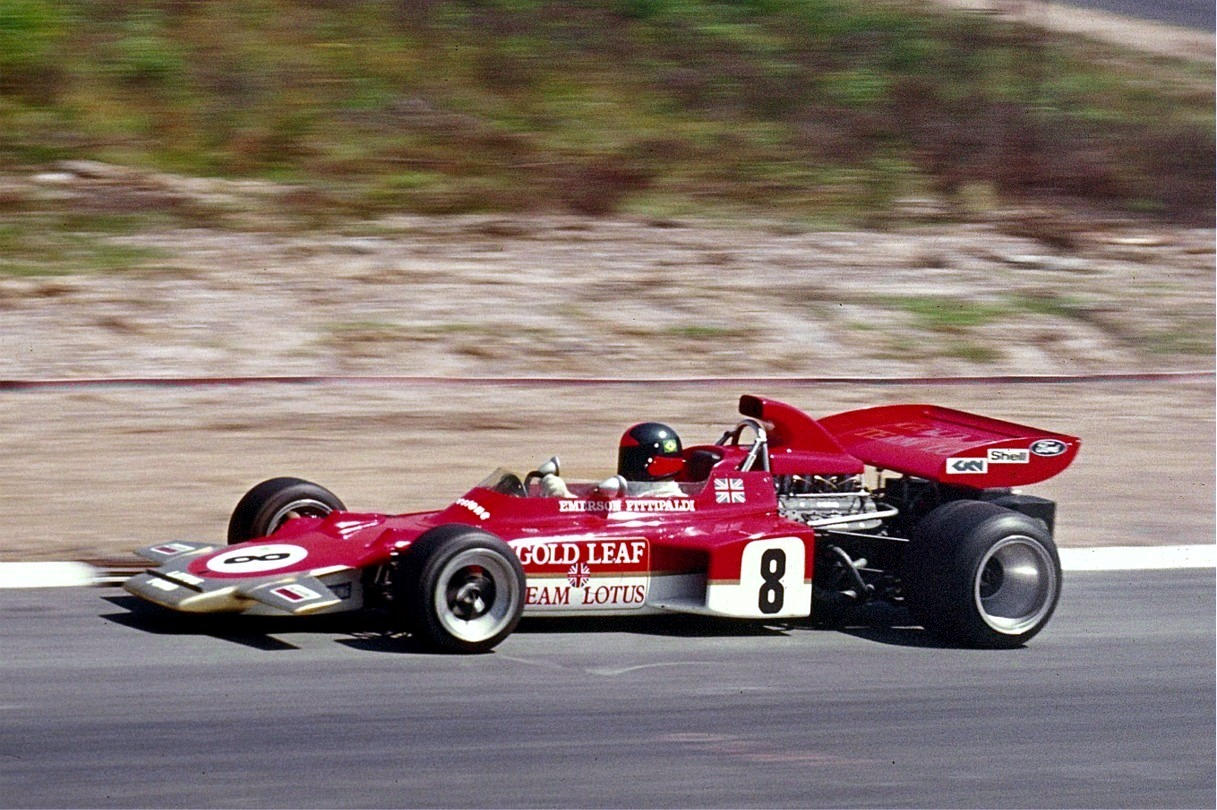
Emerson Fittipaldi in a Lotus 72 in 1971

Ayrton Senna is often regarded as one of the best racing drivers of all time. In an Autosport survey, 217 Formula One drivers were asked to vote for their top 10 greatest drivers of all-time, in the end Senna was chosen as number one. He finished on the podium 80 times, nearly half of the races in which he competed, and won 41 events He was a master of the Monaco Grand Prix, winning it a record of six times with five consecutive victories, being dubbed the "King of Monaco". Senna is also universally appraised by his wet driving performance, frequently being considered as one of the best drivers of all time in wet race conditions; as of 2023 he still retains the highest ratio of wins in wet races started.

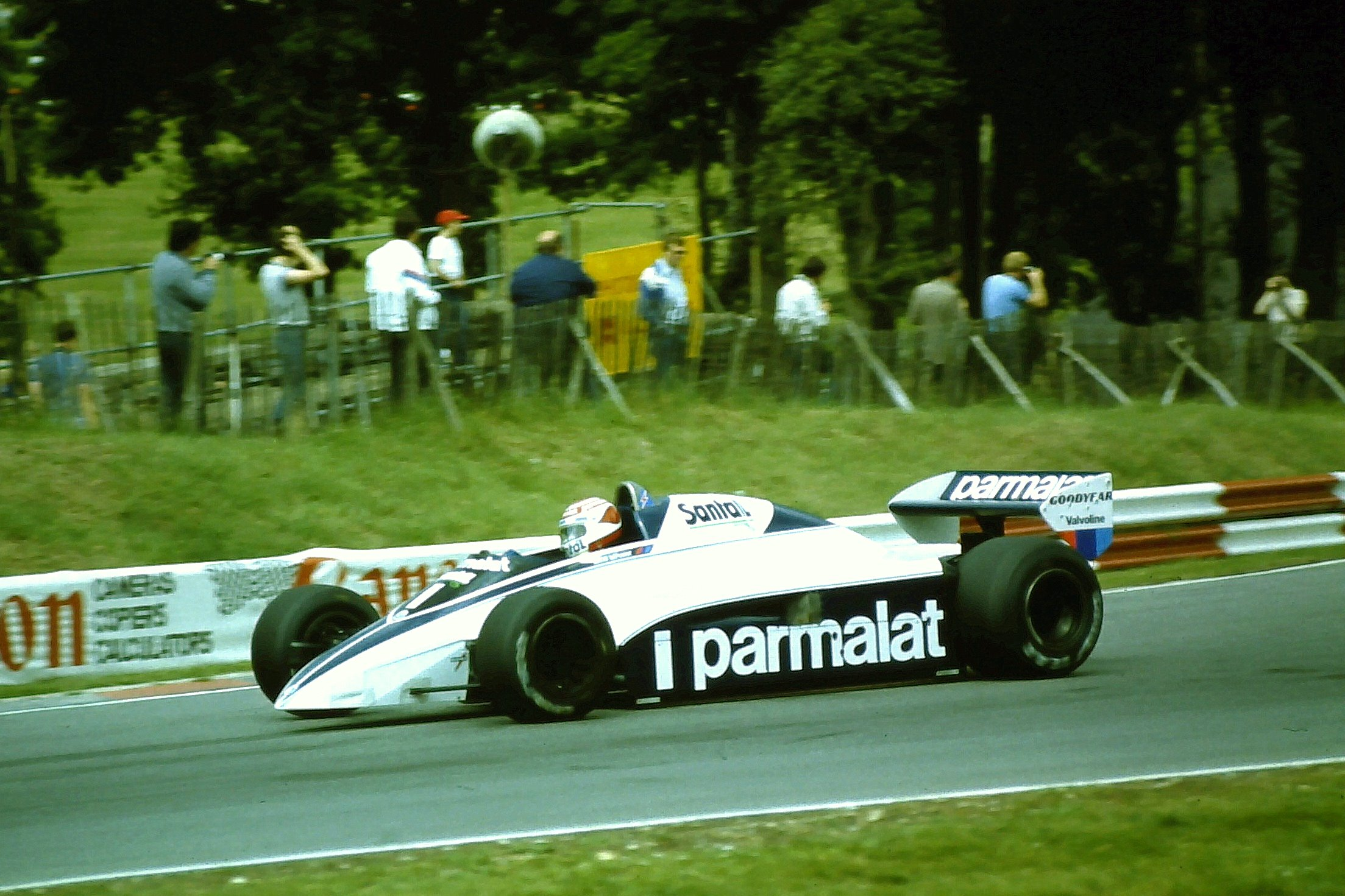
Nelson Piquet in a Brabham BT50 in 1982

Nelson Piquet won three titles in a career that spanned 14 seasons. He made his Formula One debut in 1978 as a privateer before securing a drive with Brabham. He spent the next seven seasons with the team, winning the Drivers' Championship in 1981 and 1983 before moving to Williams in 1986. Piquet had battles with teammate Nigel Mansell both on and off track. Piquet publicly called Mansell "an uneducated blockhead", with Mansell retorting that "Piquet is just a vile man". In their first year together Piquet was convinced that Williams were favouring the British driver and their distracting personal feud helped Alain Prost to the title. The following year Piquet got the upper hand and, though he had half as many wins as Mansell, his consistency saw him through to his third title. Piquet moved to Lotus for two seasons before finishing his F1 career with Benetton with whom he achieved three victories. After his retirement Piquet developed a successful satellite navigation company which helped him finance the careers of his sons, Nelson Piquet Jr. and Pedro Piquet.

Emerson Fittipaldi spent ten years in Formula One and won the Drivers' Championship in 1972 and 1974. The Autosport driver survey placed Fittipaldi in 12th place, one ahead of Piquet. Fittipaldi joined Formula One in 1970 with Lotus and achieved one victory in his first two years. In his third year, he won five races and the Drivers' Championship (the youngest champion ever at the time), and came second to Jackie Stewart the next year. Fittipaldi joined the McLaren team in 1974 and won his second title, coming runner-up the following year. Fittipaldi left McLaren to set up Fittipaldi Automotive alongside older brother Wilson, a team financed by Copersucar, the Brazilian state-run sugar marketing company. They remained uncompetitive for several years with only two podiums in the next five years. When Copersucar withdrew their sponsorship, Fittipaldi retired from driving to focus on managing the team. He did so for two years before it folded in 1982, and he returned to Brazil. Fittipaldi returned to racing in 1984 in the American CART series. He won the CART championship in 1989 and the Indianapolis 500 in both 1989 and 1993. Fittipaldi retired from racing for the second and final time in 1996, after being injured in a first-lap wreck during a CART race at Michigan International Speedway.

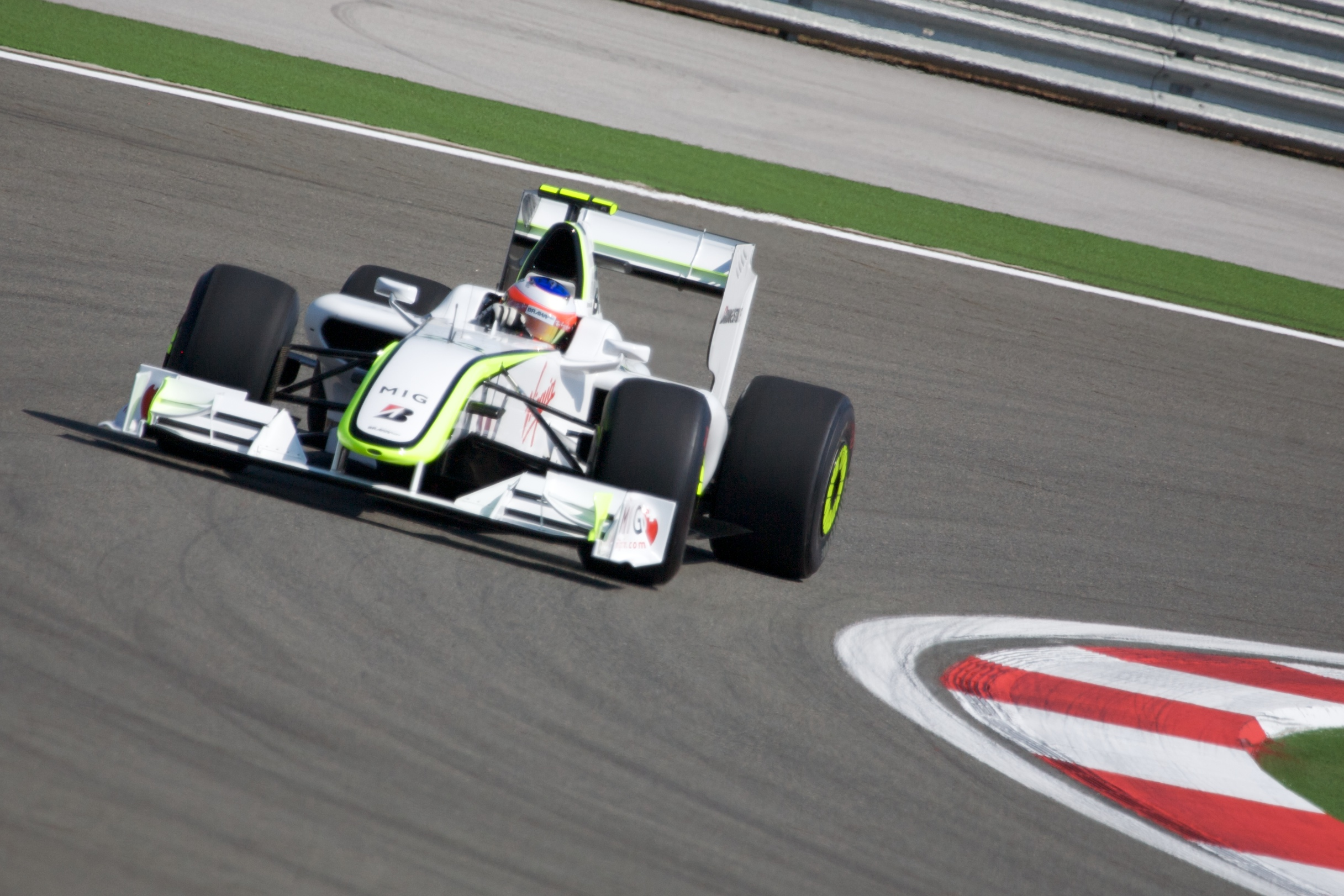
Barrichello driving for Brawn GP at the 2009 Turkish Grand Prix

Rubens Barrichello drove in 322 Formula One races. At the time of his retirement, this was the record for the most races in a Formula One career. He finished in the top four of the drivers' championship in five consecutive seasons with Ferrari between 2000 and 2004. During this time Barrichello, like Massa after him, found it difficult to be the second driver to Michael Schumacher. He left Ferrari to join Honda and endured three tough seasons before Brawn GP bought out the team and produced a 2009 car that helped him to finish third in the championship. At the beginning of his career Barrichello was mentored by Ayrton Senna, and the drivers became close friends. Senna's death, just a year after Barrichello's debut, deeply upset the young Brazilian who had been injured in a crash at the start of the same Grand Prix weekend. When Barrichello won his first race six years later he was overwhelmed by the emotion of being the first Brazilian driver, since Senna, to stand atop the podium. As of 2023, he remains the last Brazilian to win a race.

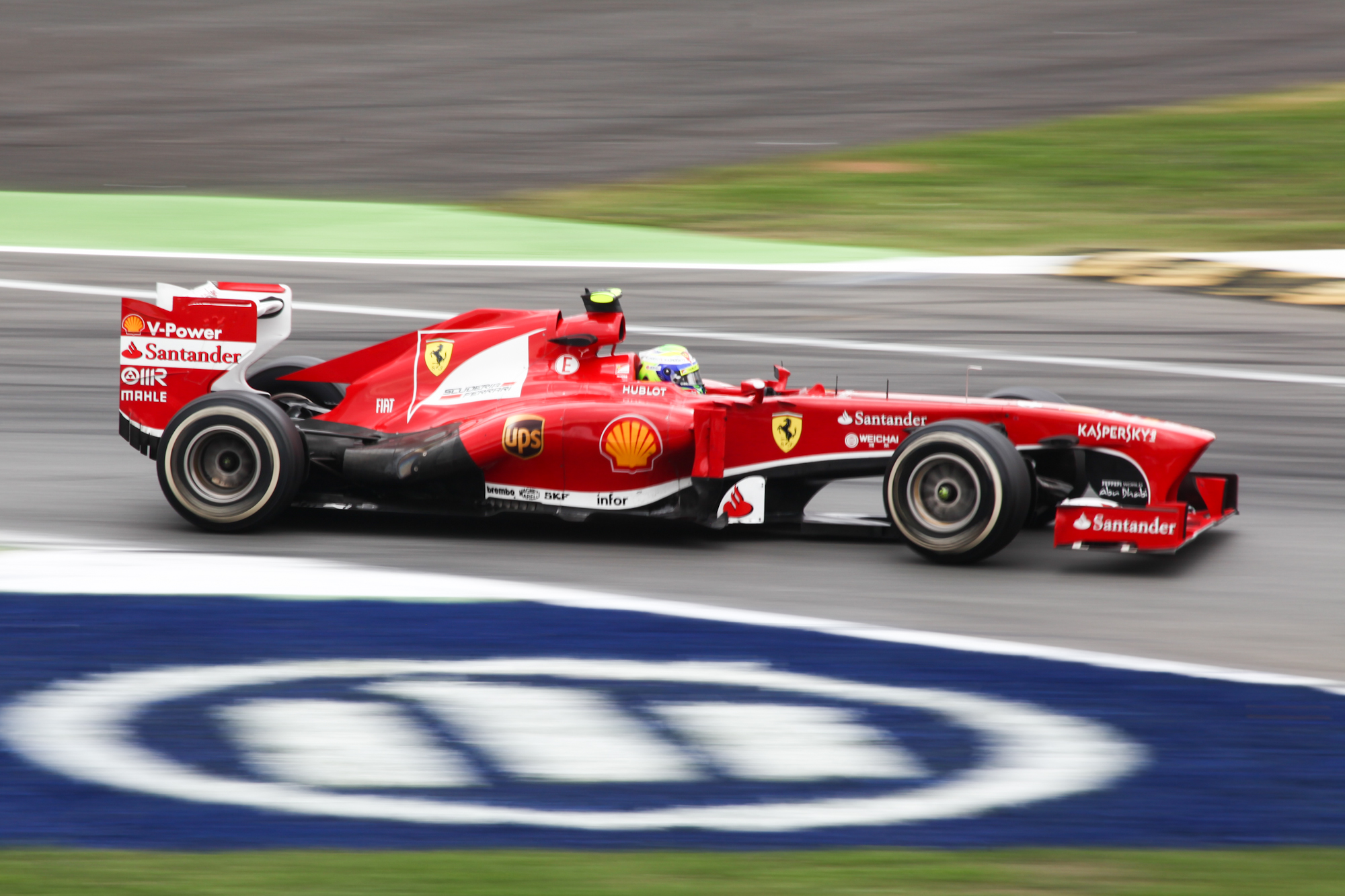
Massa driving for Ferrari at the 2013 Italian Grand Prix

Felipe Massa debuted in 2002 for Sauber and later drove for Ferrari from 2006 to 2013. In his first three seasons with the team he finished third, fourth, and then second in the drivers' championship. All eleven of his race victories happened during those three seasons. He has found himself as the number two driver in the team on several occasions, firstly to Michael Schumacher, Kimi Räikkönen and then Fernando Alonso, having to yield the lead and let the senior driver through for the victory. Massa came very close to winning the 2008 season, eventually losing to Lewis Hamilton by just one point. He lost it on the last lap of the final race of the season when Hamilton managed to pass Timo Glock for fifth position and secure enough points to win the championship. The Ferrari team, unaware of Hamilton's late overtaking move, were celebrating in the belief that Massa had won the title. When the situation became clear the message was relayed to a very disappointed Massa. For 2014, Massa moved to Williams. He announced that he would retire from Formula One at the end of the 2016 season. However, the abrupt retirement of 2016 Formula One Champion Nico Rosberg from Mercedes precipitated the late move of Valtteri Bottas from Williams to Mercedes, leaving a late vacancy at Williams. Massa subsequently postponed his retirement, returning to Williams to partner rookie Lance Stroll for the 2017 season. On 4 November 2017, Massa confirmed that he would be retiring from Formula One at the end of the 2017 season.

== Driver statistics ==
Drivers	Active years	Entries	Wins	Podiums	Career points	Poles	Fastest laps	Championships
Chico Landi	1951–1953, 1956	6	0	0	1.5	0	0	0
Gino Bianco	1952	4	0	0	0	0	0	0
Hermano da Silva Ramos	1955–1956	7	0	0	2	0	0	0
Fritz d'Orey	1959	3	0	0	0	0	0	0
Emerson Fittipaldi	1970–1980	149 (144 starts)	14	35	281	6	6	2 (1972, 1974)
Wilson Fittipaldi Júnior	1972–1973, 1975	38 (35 starts)	0	0	3	0	0	0
Carlos Pace	1972–1977	73 (72 starts)	1	6	58	1	5	0
Luiz Bueno	1973	1	0	0	0	0	0	0
Ingo Hoffmann	1976–1977	6 (3 starts)	0	0	0	0	0	0
Alex Ribeiro	1976–1977, 1979	20 (10 starts)	0	0	0	0	0	0
Nelson Piquet	1978–1991	207 (204 starts)	23	60	481.5 (485.5)	24	23	3 (1981, 1983, 1987)
Chico Serra	1981–1983	33 (18 starts)	0	0	1	0	0	0
Raul Boesel	1982–1983	30 (23 starts)	0	0	0	0	0	0
Roberto Moreno	1982, 1987, 1989–1992, 1995	75 (41 starts)	0	1	15	0	1	0
Ayrton Senna	1984–1994	162 (161 starts)	41	80	610 (614)	65	19	3 (1988, 1990, 1991)
Maurício Gugelmin	1988–1992	80 (74 starts)	0	1	10	0	1	0
Christian Fittipaldi	1992–1994	43 (40 starts)	0	0	12	0	0	0
Rubens Barrichello	1993–2011	326 (322 starts)	11	68	658	14	17	0
Pedro Diniz	1995–2000	99 (98 starts)	0	0	10	0	0	0
Ricardo Rosset	1996–1998	33 (26 starts)	0	0	0	0	0	0
Tarso Marques	1996–1997, 2001	26 (24 starts)	0	0	0	0	0	0
Ricardo Zonta	1999–2001, 2004–2005	38 (36 starts)	0	0	3	0	0	0
Luciano Burti	2000–2001	15 (14 starts)	0	0	0	0	0	0
Enrique Bernoldi	2001–2002	29 (28 starts)	0	0	0	0	0	0
Felipe Massa	2002, 2004–2017	272 (269 starts)	11	41	1167	16	15	0
Cristiano da Matta	2003–2004	28	0	0	13	0	0	0
Antônio Pizzonia	2003–2005	20	0	0	8	0	0	0
Nelsinho Piquet	2008–2009	28	0	1	19	0	0	0
Bruno Senna	2010–2012	46	0	0	33	0	1	0
Lucas di Grassi	2010	19 (18 starts)	0	0	0	0	0	0
Felipe Nasr	2015–2016	40 (39 starts)	0	0	29	0	0	0
Pietro Fittipaldi	2020	2	0	0	0	0	0	0
Gabriel Bortoleto	2025–2026	45 (43 starts)	0	0	33	0	0	0
Rafael Câmara	2026	2 (1 starts)	0	0	0	0	0	0

== See also ==
- List of Formula One Grand Prix winners
