= 2014 Protyre Formula Renault Championship =

Motor racing competition

Seasons
- ← 2013 none →

The 2014 Protyre Formula Renault Championship was a multi-event motor racing championship for open wheel, formula racing cars held across England. The championship featured a mix of professional motor racing teams and privately funded drivers competing in 2 litre Formula Renault single seat race cars that conformed to the technical regulations for the championship. The 2014 season was the 20th British Formula Renault Championship organised by the British Automobile Racing Club and the third season as the premier Formula Renault 2.0 championship in the United Kingdom. The season began at Rockingham Motor Speedway on 4 May and ended on 28 September at Silverstone Circuit. The series formed part of the BARC club racing meetings at six events all held in England, with three triple header events.

The championship was won by Pietro Fittipaldi, the grandson of two-time Formula One world champion Emerson Fittipaldi, for the MGR Motorsport team. Fittipaldi won 10 of the season's 15 races, including a streak of 8 successive wins over a trio of meetings between May and August. Fittipaldi won the championship by 65 points (on dropped scores) from Scorpio Motorsport's Piers Hickin, who won a pair of races, and like Fittipaldi, recorded 12 podium finishes. Fittipaldi's team-mate Matteo Ferrer finished third in the championship, edging out Fortec Motorsport driver Alex Gill, by five points; both drivers recorded a single win during the season. The only other winner during the season was a third MGR Motorsport driver, as Colin Noble won one of the two races in support of the British Touring Car Championship, at Silverstone.

== Teams and drivers ==
All teams were British-registered.

2014 Entry List
Team	No.	Driver name	Rounds
Fortec Motorsports	7	(United Kingdom) Alex Gill	All
Fortec Motorsports	14	(United Kingdom) Ben Barnicoat	1
Fortec Motorsports	88	(Belgium) Wolfgang Reip	1
Circulation Motorsport	8	(Finland) Niklas Tiihonen	1
Scorpio Motorsport	9	(United Kingdom) Piers Hickin	All
SWB Motorsport	18	(United Kingdom) Samuel Oram-Jones	2
SWB Motorsport	27	(Finland) Atte Lehtonen	1–3
SWB Motorsport	44	(United Kingdom) Michael Epps	6
SWB Motorsport	96	(United Kingdom) Jack Butel	All
MGR Motorsport	20	(Italy) Matteo Ferrer	All
MGR Motorsport	21	(Brazil) Pietro Fittipaldi	All
MGR Motorsport	22	(India) Tarun Reddy	1–5
MGR Motorsport	45	(United Kingdom) Colin Noble	All
Cliff Dempsey Racing	23	(Canada) Patrick Dussault	All
Cliff Dempsey Racing	28	(United States) Travis Jordan Fischer	All
Hillspeed	33	(Greece) Dimitris Papanastasiou	1–3
Gold Wolf Racing	37	(Japan) Yudai Jinkawa	2
MTECH Lite	89	(United Kingdom) Hayden Edmonds	2–4

== Race calendar and results ==
The series formed part of the BARC club racing meetings and at six events, with three triple header events. A championship calendar was released on 20 November 2013, with the final round once again in support of the 2014 British Touring Car Championship. All rounds were held in the United Kingdom.

Round		Circuit	Date	Pole position	Fastest lap	Winning driver	Winning team
1	R1	Rockingham Motor Speedway (International Super Sports Car Circuit, Northamptonshire)	5 April	(Italy) Matteo Ferrer	(Italy) Matteo Ferrer	(Brazil) Pietro Fittipaldi	MGR Motorsport
1	R2	Rockingham Motor Speedway (International Super Sports Car Circuit, Northamptonshire)	6 April	(Italy) Matteo Ferrer	(United Kingdom) Alex Gill	(Italy) Matteo Ferrer	MGR Motorsport
1	R3	Rockingham Motor Speedway (International Super Sports Car Circuit, Northamptonshire)	6 April	(Italy) Matteo Ferrer	(Italy) Matteo Ferrer	(United Kingdom) Alex Gill	Fortec Motorsports
2	R4	Donington Park (National Circuit, Leicestershire)	31 May	(United Kingdom) Alex Gill	(Brazil) Pietro Fittipaldi	(Brazil) Pietro Fittipaldi	MGR Motorsport
2	R5	Donington Park (National Circuit, Leicestershire)	31 May	(United Kingdom) Alex Gill	(United Kingdom) Piers Hickin	(Brazil) Pietro Fittipaldi	MGR Motorsport
2	R6	Donington Park (National Circuit, Leicestershire)	1 June	(United Kingdom) Piers Hickin	(Italy) Matteo Ferrer	(Brazil) Pietro Fittipaldi	MGR Motorsport
3	R7	Brands Hatch (Kent)	27 July	(Italy) Matteo Ferrer	(Italy) Matteo Ferrer	(Brazil) Pietro Fittipaldi	MGR Motorsport
3	R8	Brands Hatch (Kent)	27 July	(Brazil) Pietro Fittipaldi	(United Kingdom) Piers Hickin	(Brazil) Pietro Fittipaldi	MGR Motorsport
4	R9	Snetterton Motor Racing Circuit (300 Circuit, Norfolk)	30 August	(United Kingdom) Alex Gill	(Brazil) Pietro Fittipaldi	(Brazil) Pietro Fittipaldi	MGR Motorsport
4	R10	Snetterton Motor Racing Circuit (300 Circuit, Norfolk)	31 August	(United Kingdom) Alex Gill	(Brazil) Pietro Fittipaldi	(Brazil) Pietro Fittipaldi	MGR Motorsport
4	R11	Snetterton Motor Racing Circuit (300 Circuit, Norfolk)	31 August	(Brazil) Pietro Fittipaldi	(United Kingdom) Alex Gill	(Brazil) Pietro Fittipaldi	MGR Motorsport
5	R12	Croft Circuit (North Yorkshire)	21 September	(Italy) Matteo Ferrer	(Brazil) Pietro Fittipaldi	(United Kingdom) Piers Hickin	Scorpio Motorsport
5	R13	Croft Circuit (North Yorkshire)	21 September	(United Kingdom) Alex Gill	(Brazil) Pietro Fittipaldi	(Brazil) Pietro Fittipaldi	MGR Motorsport
6	R14	Silverstone Circuit (National Circuit, Northamptonshire)	27 September	(United Kingdom) Colin Noble	(Brazil) Pietro Fittipaldi	(United Kingdom) Colin Noble	MGR Motorsport
6	R15	Silverstone Circuit (National Circuit, Northamptonshire)	28 September	(Brazil) Pietro Fittipaldi	(Brazil) Pietro Fittipaldi	(United Kingdom) Piers Hickin	Scorpio Motorsport

== Championship standings ==
A driver's best 14 scores counted towards the championship, with any other points being discarded.

Pos	Driver	ROC			DON			BRH		SNE			CRO		SIL		Points
1	(Brazil) Pietro Fittipaldi	1	4	4	1	1	1	1	1	1	1	1	2	1	4	3	431
2	(United Kingdom) Piers Hickin	2	3	3	2	6	3	Ret	3	6	2	3	1	3	2	1	366
3	(Italy) Matteo Ferrer	3	1	2	5	10	4	2	2	3	6	7	3	5	3	5	347
4	(United Kingdom) Alex Gill	Ret	2	1	3	2	5	3	4	4	4	2	4	2	6	9	342
5	(United Kingdom) Colin Noble	4	9	7	4	5	2	Ret	8	10	7	6	6	4	1	2	286
6	(United States) Travis Jordan Fischer	Ret	7	13	6	Ret	8	6	7	5	5	5	5	6	5	4	240
7	(Canada) Patrick Dussault	8	10	9	9	4	6	5	5	9	8	10	Ret	Ret	7	8	203
8	(United Kingdom) Jack Butel	11	14	12	13	12	12	9	10	8	10	8	7	8	9	7	175
9	(United Kingdom) Hayden Edmonds				11	8	10	8	9	7	9	9					111
10	(India) Tarun Reddy (Note: Tarun Reddy was ineligible for points from the Brands Hatch round onwards, due to him competing with an Indian international licence.)	6	8	6	7	3	9	4	6	2	3	4	Ret	7			103
11	(Greece) Dimitris Papanastasiou	12	13	8	8	6	7	7	Ret								97
12	(Finland) Atte Lehtonen	9	11	10	10	11	11	DNS	11								75
13	(United Kingdom) Ben Barnicoat	5	5	5													60
14	(Belgium) Wolfgang Reip	7	6	14													41
15	(United Kingdom) Michael Epps														8	6	32
16	(Finland) Niklas Tiihonen	10	12	11													30
17	(United Kingdom) Samuel Oram-Jones				12	9	Ret										21
Pos	Driver	ROC			DON			BRH		SNE			CRO		SIL		Points

Colour	Result
Gold	Winner
Silver	Second place
Bronze	Third place
Green	Points classification
Blue	Non-points classification
Blue	Non-classified finish (NC)
Purple	Retired, not classified (Ret)
Red	Did not qualify (DNQ)
Red	Did not pre-qualify (DNPQ)
Black	Disqualified (DSQ)
White	Did not start (DNS)
White	Withdrew (WD)
White	Race cancelled (C)
Blank	Did not practice (DNP)
Blank	Did not arrive (DNA)
Blank	Excluded (EX)
