= Pietro Fittipaldi =

Brazilian and American racing driver (born 1996)

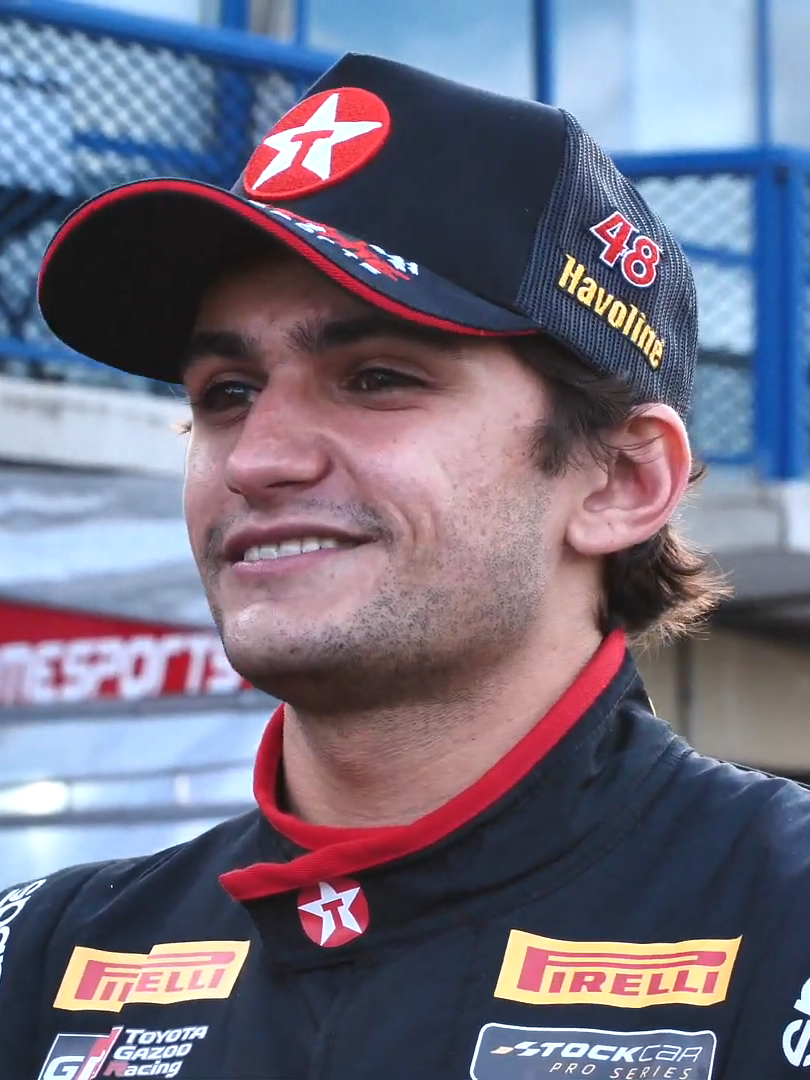
- Fittipaldi in 2021
- Born: Pietro Fittipaldi da Cruz; 25 June 1996 (age 30); Miami, Florida, U.S.
- Relatives: Enzo Fittipaldi (brother); Emerson Fittipaldi (grandfather); Emerson Fittipaldi Jr. (uncle); Max Papis (uncle); Wilson Fittipaldi (great-uncle); Christian Fittipaldi (first cousin once removed)

IMSA SportsCar Championship career
- Debut season: 2023
- Current team: Pratt Miller Motorsports
- Categorisation: FIA Gold (2017–2025); FIA Platinum (2026–)
- Car number: 73
- Former teams: Inter Europol Competition w/ PR1/Mathiasen Motorsports
- Starts: 18
- Championships: 0
- Wins: 0
- Podiums: 0
- Poles: 0
- Fastest laps: 0
- Best finish: 9th in 2026 (LMP2)

IndyCar Series career
- 26 races run over 3 years
- Team: Rahal Letterman Lanigan Racing
- Best finish: 19th (2024)
- First race: 2018 Phoenix Grand Prix (Phoenix)
- Last race: 2024 Music City Grand Prix (Nashville)
Wins	Podiums	Poles
0	0	0

Formula One World Championship career
- Nationality: (Brazil) Brazilian
- Active years: 2020
- Team: Haas
- Entries: 2
- Championships: 0
- Wins: 0
- Podiums: 0
- Career points: 0
- Pole positions: 0
- Fastest laps: 0
- First entry: 2020 Sakhir Grand Prix
- Last entry: 2020 Abu Dhabi Grand Prix

24 Hours of Le Mans career
- Years: 2022–2023
- Teams: Inter Europol Competition, Jota
- Best finish: 18th (2022)
- Class wins: 0

Previous series
- 2017; 2015; 2015–2016; 2014; 2014; 2013–2014; 2013; 2011–2012: Formula V8 3.5; FIA F3 European; MRF Challenge; Formula Renault Eurocup; Formula Renault 2.0 Alps; British Formula Renault; BRDC F4; NASCAR Whelen All-American

Championship titles
- 2017; 2015–16; 2014: Formula V8 3.5; MRF Challenge; British Formula Renault

Pietro Fittipaldi da Cruz (born 25 June 1996) is a Brazilian and American racing driver, who competes in the IMSA SportsCar Championship for Pratt Miller Motorsports, and in the European Le Mans Series for Vector Sport; he also serves as a reserve driver in Formula One for Haas and as a simulator driver for Cadillac. Fittipaldi competed under the Brazilian flag in Formula One at two Grands Prix in 2020, and the IndyCar Series between 2018 and 2024. (Note: The exact years Fittipaldi competed in the IndyCar Series: 2018, 2021, 2024.)

Born in Miami, Fittipaldi is the grandson of two-time Formula One World Drivers' Champion Emerson Fittipaldi and the older brother of racing driver Enzo. Graduating from karting to stock car racing in 2011, Fittipaldi spent two seasons in the NASCAR Whelen All-American Series before progressing to junior formulae in 2013. Fittipaldi won his first title at the 2014 Protyre Formula Renault Championship. He then won the 2015–16 MRF Challenge Formula 2000 Championship, before winning the 2017 World Series Formula V8 3.5 with Charouz. He served as a test driver in Formula E for Jaguar from 2017 to 2019. A reserve driver for Haas since 2019, Fittipaldi made his Formula One debut at the 2020 Sakhir Grand Prix, replacing an injured Romain Grosjean to become the fourth member of the Fittipaldi family to compete in Formula One, and finishing seventeenth. He made a further appearance in 2020 at the season-ending Abu Dhabi Grand Prix. Following three seasons in sportscar racing—winning the LMP2 class at the 2023 6 Hours of Monza—Fittipaldi competed full-time in the IndyCar Series in 2024 with RLL.

Outside of open-wheel racing, Fittipaldi competed in the Deutsche Tourenwagen Masters in 2019, the European Le Mans Series from 2021 to 2022, and the FIA World Endurance Championship in 2023. Fittipaldi has competed in the LMP2 class of the IMSA SportsCar Championship since 2023 for Rick Ware, Inter Europol, and Pratt Miller.

== Early and personal life ==
Fittipaldi da Cruz was born on 25 June 1996 in Miami, Florida, U.S. Fittipaldi is the grandson of two-time Formula One World Champion Emerson Fittipaldi and the older brother of racing driver Enzo.

== Junior racing career ==
=== NASCAR Whelen All-American Series ===
Fittipaldi began his racing career in the NASCAR Whelen All-American Series, winning the track championship at Hickory Motor Speedway in 2011. In 2012, he won one race and finished fifth in the championship.

=== Lower formulae ===
Fittipaldi moved to Europe to pursue a career in open-wheeled racing in 2013, making his debut in the BRDC Formula 4 Championship and Protyre Formula Renault Championship In 2014, he won the latter series, clinching the title with one race remaining. He won the 2015-16 MRF Challenge Formula 2000 Championship with four wins from fourteen races.

=== FIA Formula 3 European Championship ===
In 2015, Fittipaldi competed in the FIA Formula 3 European Championship for Fortec Motorsports. With a best result of sixth at two of the races at Algarve, Fittipaldi finished seventeenth in the championship standings with 32 points.

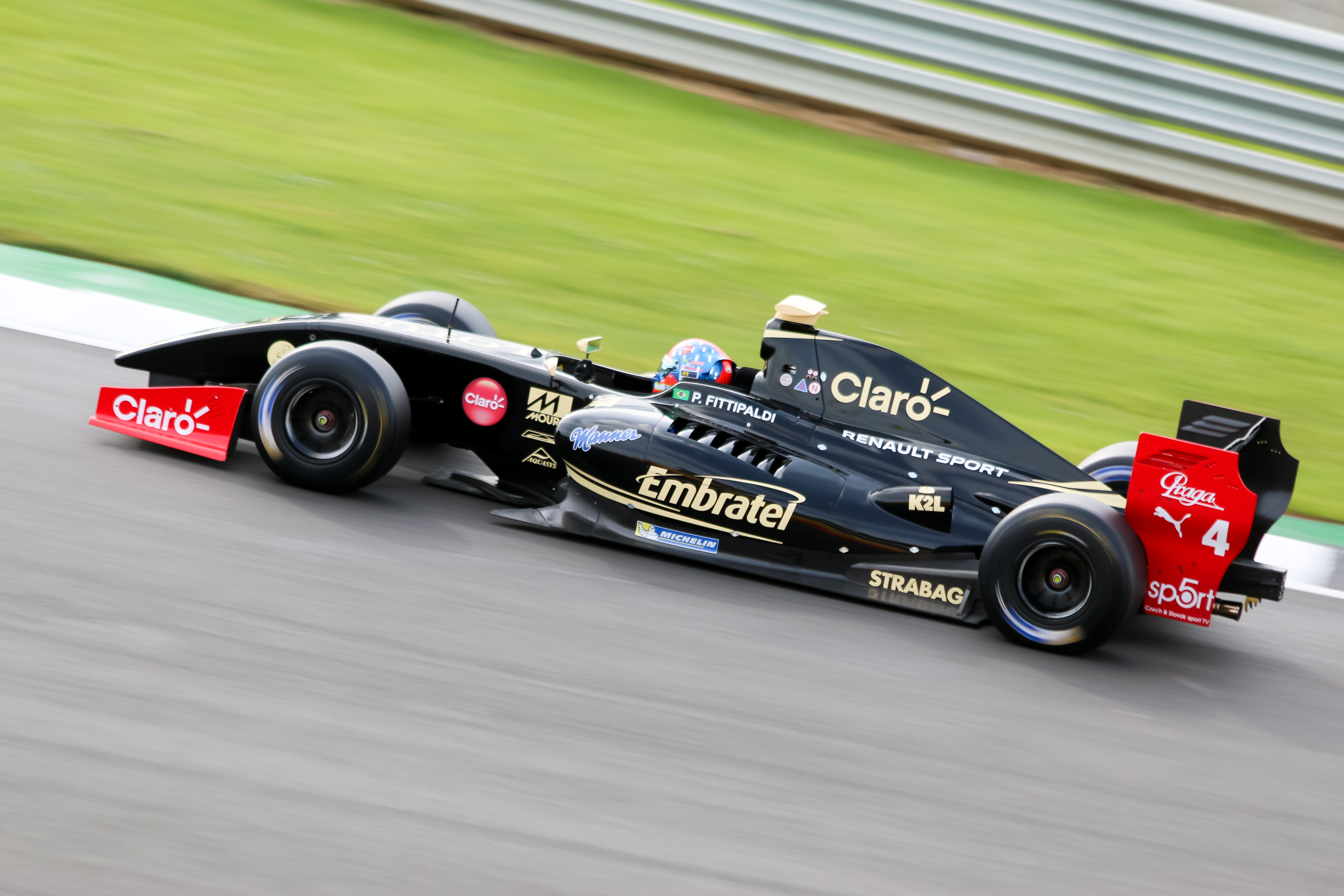
Fittipaldi driving a Lotus Formula V8 3.5 at the Silverstone Circuit in 2017

=== Formula V8 3.5 Series ===
Fittipaldi continued racing for Fortec in 2016, this time driving in the Formula V8 3.5 Series alongside fellow rookie Louis Delétraz. However, he only scored one podium and ended up tenth in the standings, eight positions behind his teammate.

Nevertheless, Fittipaldi continued competing in the World Series, this time with Lotus. He won six races, dominating the championship, 44 points ahead of his closest rival Matevos Isaakyan.

== IndyCar career ==
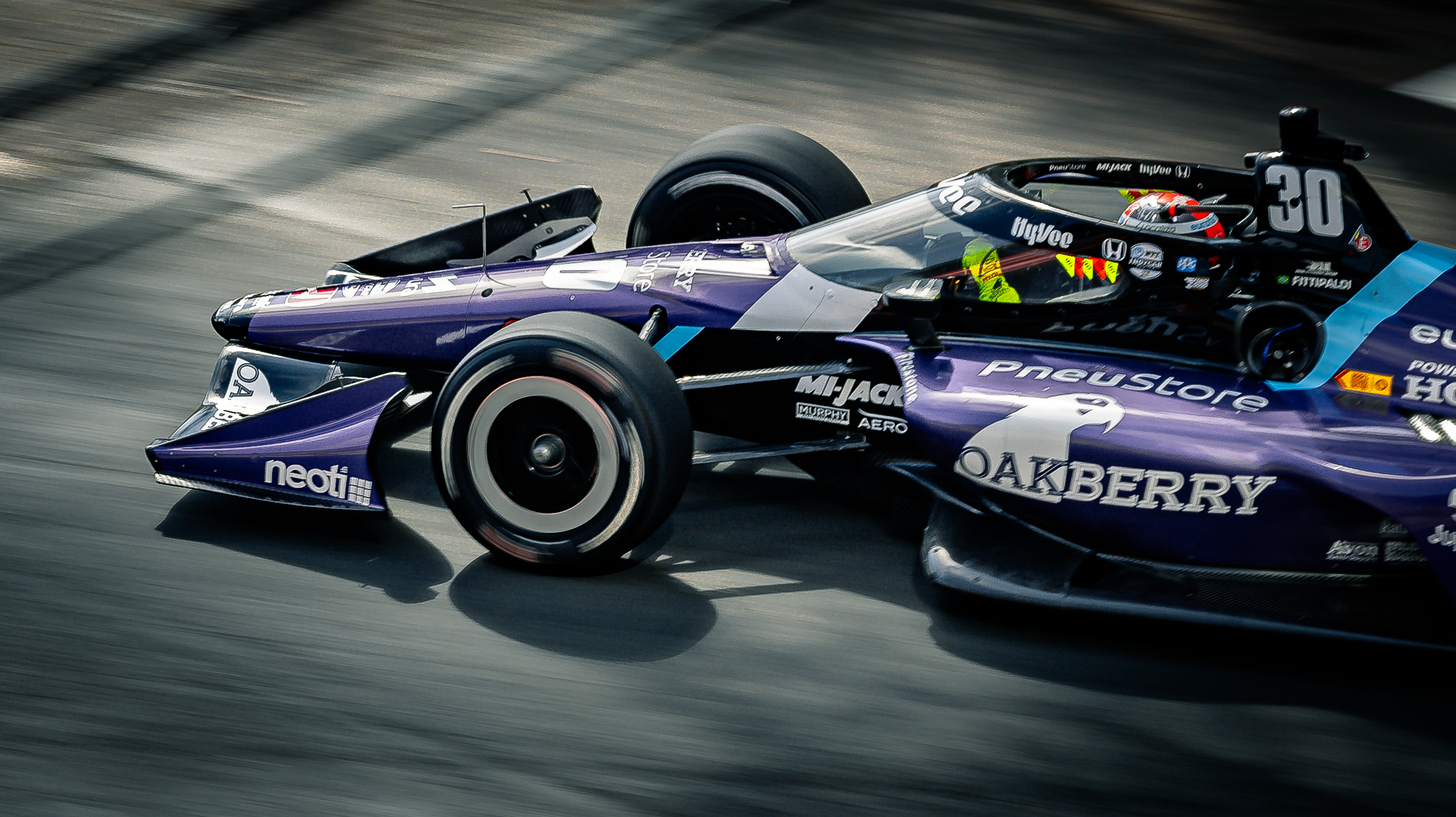
Fittipaldi at the 2024 Grand Prix of St Petersburg

In February 2018, Fittipaldi was named a part-time driver of the No. 19 Honda for Dale Coyne Racing in the IndyCar Series, replacing Zachary Claman DeMelo in six races that year. He made his debut at the Phoenix Grand Prix, where he was forced to retire after contact on lap forty. He achieved his first top-ten finish at Portland and finished 26th in the standings.

Fittipaldi returned to IndyCar in 2021 exclusively for oval races, splitting the No. 51 Dale Coyne Racing with RWR car with Romain Grosjean, who planned to only enter road and street circuit rounds. Fittipaldi was the fastest rookie qualifier for the 2021 Indianapolis 500.

On 23 October 2023, Rahal Letterman Lanigan Racing announced Fittipaldi would drive the No. 30 Honda for the 2024 IndyCar Series. At the opening round of the season, the 2024 Firestone Grand Prix of St. Petersburg, he finished thirteenth, his best result of the season.

== Formula One career ==
In October 2014, Fittipaldi was one of four drivers to be invited to test for the Ferrari Driver Academy. He first tested a Formula One car on 27 November 2018 during the post-season test at the Yas Marina Circuit, driving for Haas.

=== Haas reserve driver (2019–present) ===
In November 2018, the Haas F1 Team confirmed Fittipaldi as its official 2019 test driver. Haas announced that he would test the car at the first pre-season test at Barcelona in February 2019. In April 2019, Fittipaldi took part in the 2019 Bahrain Young Driver Test, before then making an appearance at the mid-season test at Catalunya.

On 30 November 2020, it was announced that Fittipaldi would race for Haas in the 2020 Sakhir Grand Prix, replacing the injured Romain Grosjean who was hospitalised after an accident at the 2020 Bahrain Grand Prix in which he suffered burns to his hands and ankles. This made him the first grandson of a Formula One driver to become a Formula One driver himself. Fittipaldi started his debut Grand Prix in last and finished the race seventeenth, the last of the remaining drivers. Haas team principal Guenther Steiner commented on Fittipaldi's debut "I think Pietro did a great job, considering he drove the car for the last time a year ago". Fittipaldi remarked that it is difficult for a driver to make it to Formula One, and he was glad to have finished his first race.

Fittipaldi again stood in for Grosjean at the season finale in Abu Dhabi. Fittipaldi qualified nineteenth and was elevated to seventeenth on the grid due to other drivers collecting penalties. In the race, he suffered a slow pit stop and again finished last of the running drivers in nineteenth place. After the race, Fittipaldi stated that he would "like to still keep a foot in Formula One" as a reserve driver in 2021. In February 2021 it was confirmed that he would remain in his role as a Haas test and reserve driver for the 2021 season.

Fittipaldi was retained in the role for the 2022 season. He drove the Haas VF-22 during the first day of 2022 pre-season testing at the Bahrain International Circuit, substituting for Nikita Mazepin after Mazepin's contract was terminated. Fittipaldi was replaced for the remainder of the test by Kevin Magnussen. Fittipaldi was actively considered by Haas for Mazepin's seat in the race team but ultimately Magnussen was chosen over him.

Fittipaldi drove the VF-22 in the free practices of the Mexico City and Abu Dhabi Grands Prix and also took part in post-season testing in Abu Dhabi. Haas retained Fittipaldi's roles for the 2023 season. He drove the VF-23 during the young drivers' test. Fittipaldi continued in his role as reserve driver for a sixth straight season in 2024, sharing this role with Oliver Bearman. He drove the VF-24 alongside Bearman during the Pirelli tyre test at Silverstone following the British Grand Prix.

=== Cadillac development driver (2026–) ===
On 1 October 2025, it was announced that Fittipaldi will become a development driver for the upcoming Cadillac F1 Team, which debuted in 2026.

== Sportscar racing career ==
=== FIA World Endurance Championship ===
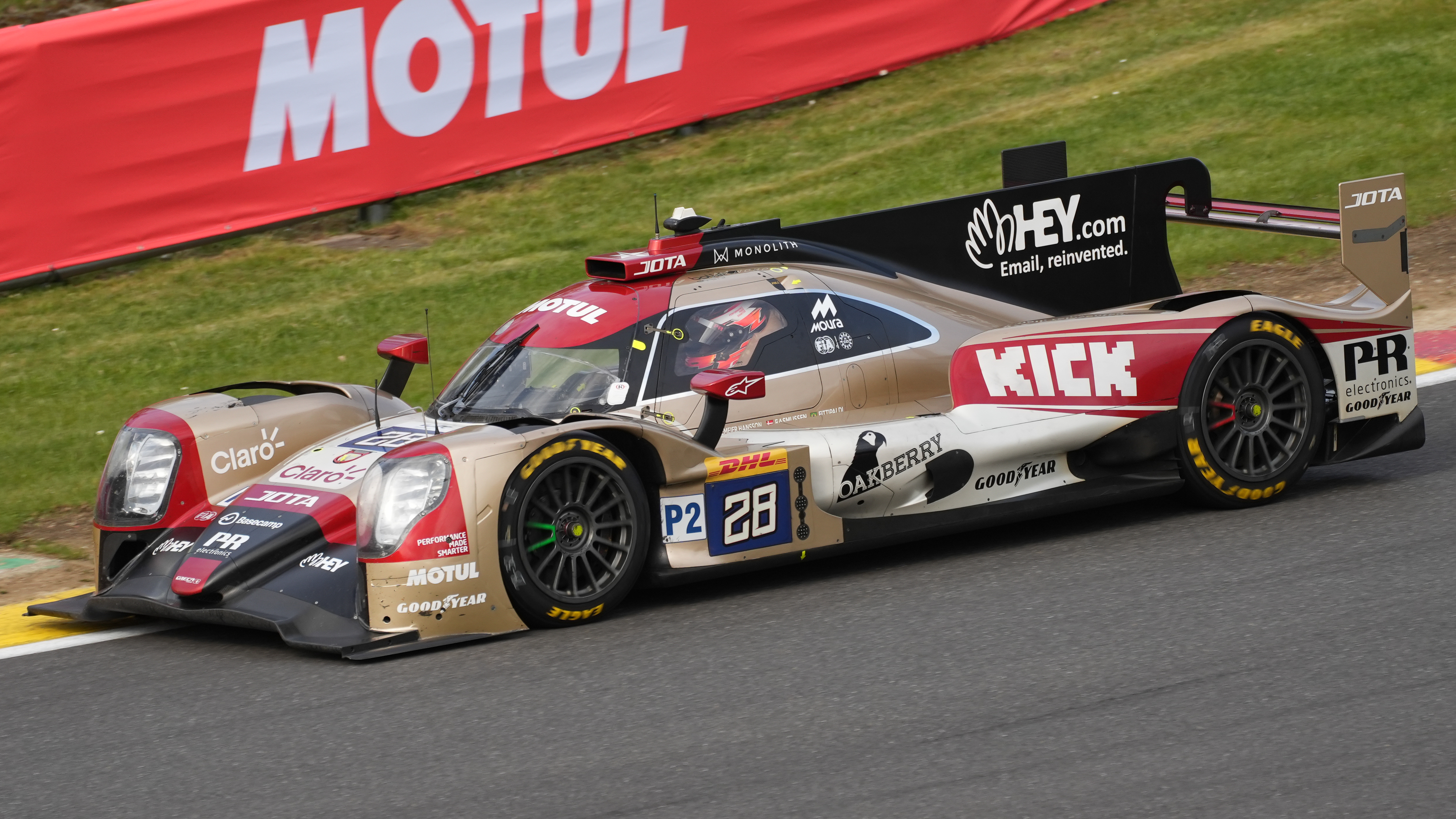
Fittipaldi driving Jota Sport's Oreca 07 at the 2023 6 Hours of Spa-Francorchamps

In May 2018, at the 6 Hours of Spa-Francorchamps Fittipaldi suffered a high-speed crash in which his car lost steering and a wheel entered the cockpit, breaking both legs. Doctors initially projected a year’s recovery, but after rehabilitation aided by IndyCar medical personnel and the use of custom carbon-fiber braces, he returned to racing approximately two and a half months later.

In January 2023, it was announced that Fittipaldi would drive full-time in the 2023 FIA World Endurance Championship for Jota Sport alongside David Heinemeier Hansson and Oliver Rasmussen.

During his tenure in endurance racing, Fittipaldi underwent significant weight loss to optimize car performance, later gaining about 20 lb to meet the physical demands of IndyCar as he transitioned into that series.

=== IMSA SportsCar Championship ===
==== 2025 ====
Following select starts in 2023 and 2024, Fittipaldi joined the 2025 IMSA SportsCar Championship full-time in LMP2 driving for Pratt Miller Motorsports.

=== European Le Mans Series ===
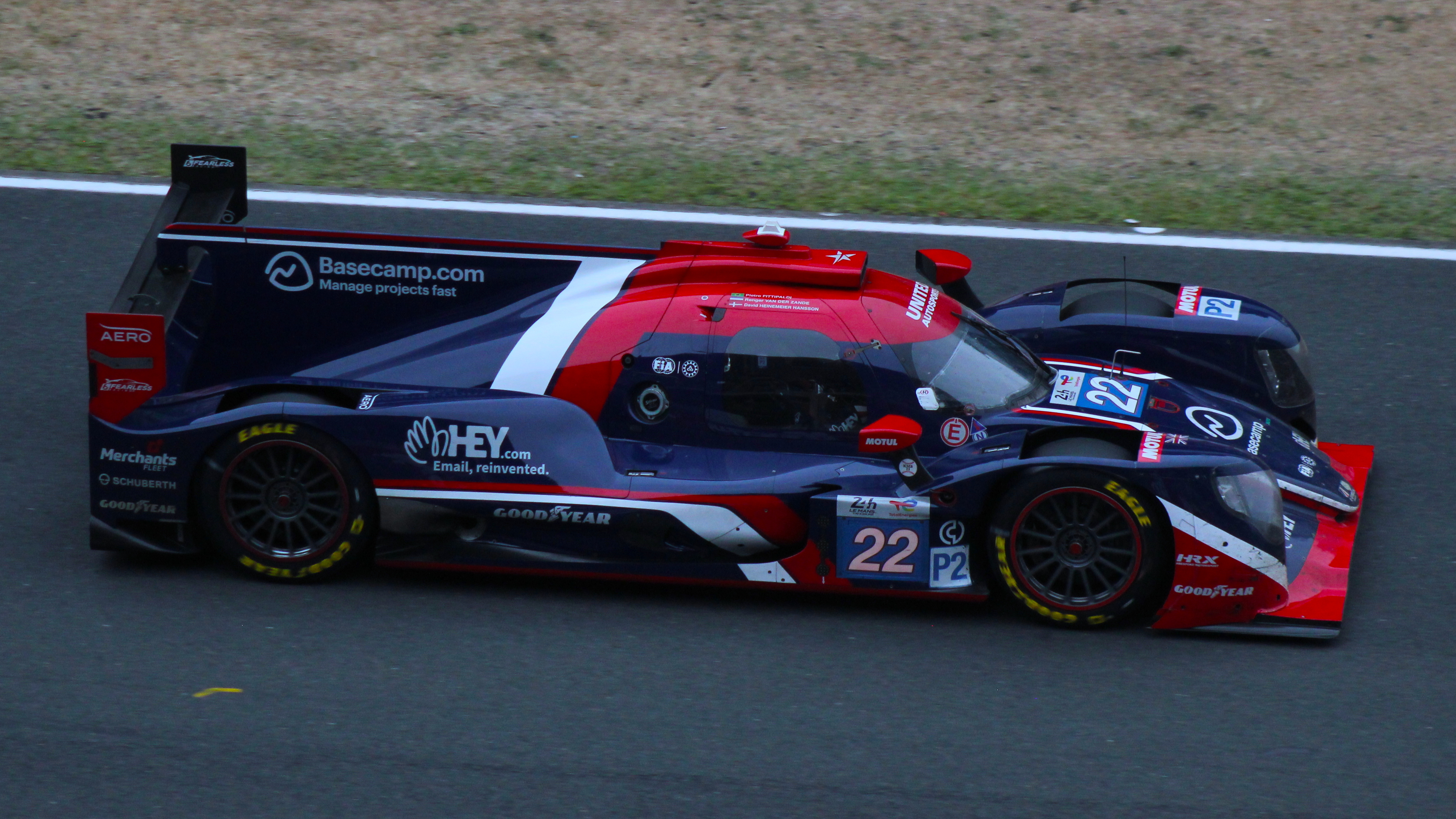
Fittipaldi's No. 22 car at the 2025 24 Hours of Le Mans

==== 2025 ====
After a three year hiatus from the series, Fittipaldi signed with Vector Sport to compete in the 2025 European Le Mans Series, dovetailing his full-time 2025 IMSA SportsCar Championship campaign.

== Other racing ==
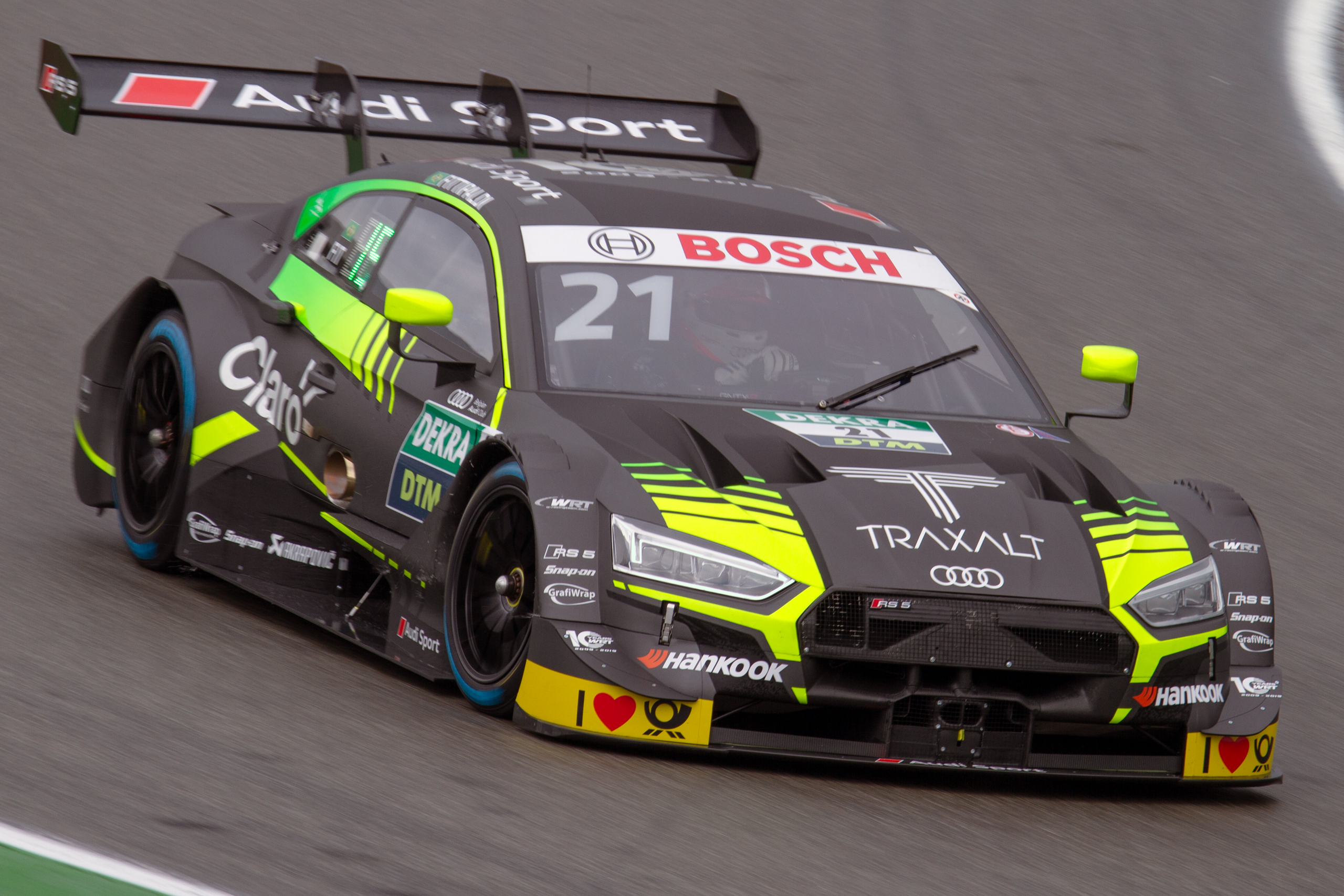
Fittipaldi driving the Audi RS5 Turbo DTM at the 2019 1st Hockenheim DTM round

=== Deutsche Tourenwagen Masters ===
Fittipaldi raced for Audi Sport Team WRT in the 2019 Deutsche Tourenwagen Masters. He scored a best result of fifth at Misano, and finished in the points six times, scoring 22 and ended up fifteenth in the drivers' standings.

== Racing record ==
=== Karting career summary ===
Season	Series	Position
2004	WKA Florida Championship Series — Easykart 60cc	14th
2005	Florida Winter Tour — Easy Kart 60	15th
2005	WKA Florida Championship Series — Easykart 60cc	10th
2005	WKA Florida Championship Series — Cadet Jr. Sportsman	13th
2006	Florida Winter Tour — Rotax Mini Max	6th
2007	Florida Winter Tour — Rotax Mini Max	6th
2008	Rotax Max Challenge USA Grand Nationals — Minimax	4th
2009	SKUSA SuperNationals — TaG Junior	DNF
2009	Rotax Max Challenge USA Grand Nationals — Minimax	30th
2009	Florida Winter Tour — KF3	5th
2011	Desafio Internacional das Estrelas	19th
2012	Desafio Internacional das Estrelas	11th
2012	Florida Winter Tour — Rotax Junior	30th

=== Racing career summary ===
Season	Series	Team	Races	Wins	Poles	F/Laps	Podiums	Points	Position
2011	NASCAR Whelen All-American Series	Lee Faulk Racing	20	4	3	?	13	400	**1st**†
2012	NASCAR Whelen All-American Series	Lee Faulk Racing	23	1	2	?	3	355	5th
2013	Protyre Formula Renault Championship	Jamun Racing Services	16	0	0	0	0	163	8th
2013	Protyre Formula Renault Autumn Cup	Jamun Racing Services	3	0	0	0	1	45	6th
2013	BRDC Formula 4 Championship	MGR Motorsport	18	1	0	1	1	165	15th
2013	BRDC Formula 4 Winter Championship	MGR Motorsport	8	0	0	0	3	127	6th
2014	Protyre Formula Renault Championship	MGR Motorsport	15	10	3	7	12	431	**1st**
2014	Formula Renault 2.0 Alps	MGR Motorsport	8	0	0	0	0	43	9th
2014	Eurocup Formula Renault 2.0	Koiranen GP	2	0	0	0	0	0	NC††
2015	FIA Formula 3 European Championship	Fortec Motorsports	33	0	0	0	0	32	17th
2015	Masters of Formula 3	Fortec Motorsports	1	0	0	0	0	N/A	13th
2015–16	MRF Challenge Formula 2000	MRF Racing	14	4	2	2	9	244	**1st**
2016	Formula V8 3.5 Series	Fortec Motorsports	18	0	0	0	1	60	10th
2017	World Series Formula V8 3.5	Lotus	18	6	10	2	10	259	**1st**
2017–18	Formula E	Panasonic Jaguar Racing	Test driver						
2018	IndyCar Series	Dale Coyne Racing	6	0	0	0	0	91	26th
2018	Super Formula	UOMO Sunoco Team LeMans	1	0	0	0	0	0	22nd
2018–19	FIA World Endurance Championship	DragonSpeed	0	0	0	0	0	0	NC
2018–19	Formula E	Panasonic Jaguar Racing	Test driver						
2019	Deutsche Tourenwagen Masters	Audi Sport Team WRT	15	0	0	2	0	22	15th
2019	Deutsche Tourenwagen Masters	Audi Sport Team Rosberg	2	0	0	0	0	22	15th
2019	Formula One	Haas F1 Team	Test driver						
2019–20	F3 Asian Championship	Pinnacle Motorsport	15	0	0	0	1	119	5th
2020	Formula One	Haas F1 Team	2	0	0	0	0	0	23rd
2021	IndyCar Series	Dale Coyne Racing with Rick Ware Racing	3	0	0	0	0	34	32nd
2021	European Le Mans Series - LMP2	G-Drive Racing	1	0	0	0	0	6	26th
2021	Stock Car Brasil	Full Time Bassani	2	0	0	0	0	0	NC‡
2021	Formula One	Uralkali Haas F1 Team	Test/Reserve Driver						
2022	European Le Mans Series - LMP2	Inter Europol Competition	6	0	0	0	1	32	10th
2022	24 Hours of Le Mans - LMP2	Inter Europol Competition	1	0	0	0	0	N/A	14th
2022	Stock Car Brasil	Full Time Bassani	1	0	0	0	0	0	NC‡
2022	Formula One	Haas F1 Team	Test/Reserve driver						
2023	FIA World Endurance Championship - LMP2	Jota	7	1	1	0	2	84	6th
2023	24 Hours of Le Mans - LMP2	Jota	1	0	0	0	0	N/A	13th
2023	IMSA SportsCar Championship - LMP2	Rick Ware Racing	3	0	0	0	0	484	22nd
2023	Formula One	MoneyGram Haas F1 Team	Test/Reserve driver						
2024	IndyCar Series	Rahal Letterman Lanigan Racing	18	0	0	0	0	186	19th
2024	IMSA SportsCar Championship - LMP2	Inter Europol by PR1/Mathiasen Motorsports	1	0	0	0	0	312	40th
2024	Formula One	Haas F1 Team	Test/Reserve driver						
2025	IMSA SportsCar Championship - LMP2	Pratt Miller Motorsports	7	0	0	0	0	1756	14th
2025	European Le Mans Series - LMP2	Vector Sport	6	0	0	0	2	54	4th
2025	24 Hours of Le Mans - LMP2	United Autosports	1	0	0	0	0	N/A	7th
2025	Formula One	Haas F1 Team	Test/Reserve driver						
2026	IMSA SportsCar Championship - LMP2	Pratt Miller Motorsports	7	0	0	0	0	1782	9th
2026	European Le Mans Series - LMP2	Vector Sport	6	0	0	0	0	44	8th
2026	24 Hours of Le Mans - LMP2	Vector Sport	1	0	0	0	0	N/A	4th
2026	Formula One	Cadillac F1 Team	Simulator driver						

^{†} Fittipaldi did not win the national championship; he was the individual track champion of Hickory Motor Speedway.
^{‡} As Fittipaldi was a guest driver, he was ineligible for championship points.
^{*} Season still in progress.

=== Open-wheel racing results ===
==== Complete BRDC Formula 4 Championship results ====
(key) (Races in bold indicate pole position; races in italics indicate fastest lap)

Year	Team	1	2	3	4	5	6	7	8	9	10	11	12	13	14	15	16	17	18	19	20	21	22	23	24	Pos	Points
2013	MGR Motorsport	SIL; 1; 10	SIL; 2; 9	SIL; 3 Ret	BRH; 1; 13	BRH; 2 Ret	BRH; 3 Ret	SNE; 1 DSQ	SNE; 2; 13	SNE; 3; 9	OUL; 1	OUL; 2	OUL; 3	BRH; 1; 1	BRH; 2; 8	BRH; 3; 14	SIL; 1; 10	SIL; 2; 12	SIL; 3; 10	SNE; 1; 10	SNE; 2; 7	SNE; 3; 13	DON; 1	DON; 2	DON; 3	15th	165

==== Complete Protyre Formula Renault Championship results ====
(key) (Races in bold indicate pole position; races in italics indicate fastest lap)

Year	Team	1	2	3	4	5	6	7	8	9	10	11	12	13	14	15	16	Pos	Points
2013	Jamun Racing Services	DON; 1 Ret	DON; 2; 9	SNE; 1; 17	SNE; 2; 5	SNE; 3 Ret	THR; 1; 6	THR; 2; 12	THR; 3 Ret	CRO; 1; 7	CRO; 2 Ret	CRO; 3; 16	ROC; 1; 7	ROC; 2; 12	ROC; 3; 6	SIL; 1; 6	SIL; 2; 6	8th	163
2014	MGR Motorsport	ROC; 1; 1	ROC; 2; 4	ROC; 3; 4	DON; 1; 1	DON; 2; 1	DON; 3; 1	BRH; 1; 1	**BRH**; **2**; 1	SNE; 1; 1	SNE; 2; 1	**SNE**; **3**; 1	CRO; 1; 2	CRO; 2; 1	SIL; 1; 4	**SIL**; **2**; 3		1st	431

==== Complete Eurocup Formula Renault 2.0 results ====
(key) (Races in bold indicate pole position; races in italics indicate fastest lap)

Year	Entrant	1	2	3	4	5	6	7	8	9	10	11	12	13	14	DC	Points
2014	Koiranen GP	ALC; 1	ALC; 2	SPA; 1	SPA; 2	MSC; 1	MSC; 2	NÜR; 1	NÜR; 2	HUN; 1	HUN; 2	LEC; 1	LEC; 2	JER; 1 Ret	JER; 2; 14	NC†	0

† As Fittipaldi was a guest driver, he was ineligible for points

==== Complete Formula Renault 2.0 Alps results ====
(key) (Races in bold indicate pole position; races in italics indicate fastest lap)

Year	Team	1	2	3	4	5	6	7	8	9	10	11	12	13	14	Pos	Points
2014	MGR Motorsport	IMO; 1	IMO; 2	PAU; 1	PAU; 2	RBR; 1	RBR; 2	SPA; 1 Ret	SPA; 2; 13	MNZ; 1; 12	MNZ; 2; 5	MUG; 1; 4	MUG; 2; 8	JER; 1; 19	JER; 2; 10	9th	43

==== Complete FIA Formula 3 European Championship results ====
(key) (Races in bold indicate pole position) (Races in italics indicate fastest lap)

Year	Entrant	Engine	1	2	3	4	5	6	7	8	9	10	11	12	13	14	15	16	17	18	19	20	21	22	23	24	25	26	27	28	29	30	31	32	33	DC	Points
2015	Fortec Motorsports	Mercedes	SIL; 1; 11	SIL; 2; 8	SIL; 3 Ret	HOC; 1 Ret	HOC; 2; 20	HOC; 3 Ret	PAU; 1 DNS	PAU; 2 DNQ	PAU; 3 DNQ	MNZ; 1; 7	MNZ; 2; 9	MNZ; 3; 11	SPA; 1; 8	SPA; 2; 21	SPA; 3; 10	NOR; 1; 19	NOR; 2 Ret	NOR; 3; 16	ZAN; 1; 17	ZAN; 2; 20	ZAN; 3; 20	RBR; 1; 23	RBR; 2; 32	RBR; 3; 24	ALG; 1; 12	ALG; 2; 6	ALG; 3; 6	NÜR; 1; 15	NÜR; 2 Ret	NÜR; 3; 18	HOC; 1; 13	HOC; 2; 16	HOC; 3 Ret	17th	32

==== Complete MRF Challenge Formula 2000 results ====
(key) (Races in bold indicate pole position; races in italics indicate fastest lap)

Year	1	2	3	4	5	6	7	8	9	10	11	12	13	14	Pos	Points
2015–16	ABU; 1; 2	ABU; 2; 3	ABU; 3; 5	ABU; 4; 1	BHR; 1; 4	BHR; 2; 2	DUB; 1; 2	DUB; 2; 5	DUB; 3; 3	DUB; 4; 1	**CHE**; **1**; 1	CHE; 2; 5	**CHE**; **3**; 1	CHE; 4; 4	1st	244

==== Complete World Series Formula V8 3.5 results ====
(key) (Races in bold indicate pole position; races in italics indicate fastest lap)

Year	Team	1	2	3	4	5	6	7	8	9	10	11	12	13	14	15	16	17	18	Pos	Points
2016	Fortec Motorsports	ALC; 1; 11	ALC; 2; 9	HUN; 1; 8	HUN; 2; 8	SPA; 1; 11†	SPA; 2; 10†	LEC; 1 Ret	LEC; 2; 7	SIL; 1; 6	SIL; 2 Ret	RBR; 1; 11	RBR; 2; 11	MNZ; 1; 11	MNZ; 2; 4	JER; 1; 9	JER; 2; 12	CAT; 1; 7	CAT; 2; 3	10th	60
2017	Lotus	**SIL**; **1**; 1	**SIL**; **2**; 1	SPA; 1; 8	**SPA**; **2**; 6	**MNZ**; **1**; 9	**MNZ**; **2**; 4	JER; 1; 2	**JER**; **2**; 1	**ALC**; **1** Ret	**ALC**; **2**; 1	NÜR; 1; 7	NÜR; 2; 6	**MEX**; **1**; 1	**MEX**; **2**; 1	COA; 1; 3	COA; 2 Ret	BHR; 1; 2	BHR; 2; 2	1st	259

^{†} Driver did not finish, but was classified as he completed over 90% of the race distance.

==== Complete IndyCar Series results ====
(key) (Races in bold indicate pole position) (Races in italics indicate fastest lap)

Year	Team	No.	Chassis	Engine	1	2	3	4	5	6	7	8	9	10	11	12	13	14	15	16	17	18	Rank	Points	Ref
2018	Dale Coyne Racing	19	Dallara DW12	Honda	STP	PHX; 23	LBH	ALA	IMS	INDY	DET	DET	TXS	RDA	IOW	TOR	MDO; 23	POC; 22	GTW; 11	POR; 9	SNM; 16		26th	91	
2021	Dale Coyne Racing with Rick Ware Racing	51	Dallara DW12	Honda	ALA	STP	TXS; 15	TXS; 21	IMS	INDY; 25	DET	DET	ROA	MDO	NSH	IMS	GTW	POR	LAG	LBH			32nd	34	
2024	Rahal Letterman Lanigan Racing	30	Dallara DW12	Honda	STP; 13	THE; 12	LBH; 24	ALA; 27	IMS; 14	INDY; 32	DET; 13	ROA; 16	LAG; 14	MDO; 24	IOW; 20	IOW; 20	TOR; 19	GTW; 14	POR; 25	MIL; 18	MIL; 21	NSH; 21	19th	186	

* Season still in progress.

===== Indianapolis 500 =====
Year	Chassis	Engine	Start	Finish	Team
2021	Dallara	Honda	13	25	Dale Coyne Racing with Rick Ware Racing
2024	Dallara	Honda	30	32	Rahal Letterman Lanigan Racing

==== Complete Super Formula results ====
(key) (Races in bold indicate pole position) (Races in italics indicate fastest lap)

Year	Team	Engine	1	2	3	4	5	6	7	DC	Points
2018	UOMO Sunoco Team LeMans	Toyota	SUZ; 16	AUT	SUG	FUJ	MOT	OKA	SUZ	22nd	0

==== Complete Deutsche Tourenwagen Masters results ====
Year	Entrant	Car	Engine	1	2	3	4	5	6	7	8	9	10	11	12	13	14	15	16	17	18	Rank	Points
2019	Audi Sport Team WRT	Audi RS5 Turbo DTM	Audi RC8 2.0 TFSI I-4 t	HOC; 1; 10	HOC; 2; 15	ZOL; 1; 14	ZOL; 2; 9			NOR; 1 Ret	NOR; 2; 15	ASS; 1; 11	ASS; 2; 10	BRH; 1 DNS	BRH; 2; 16	LAU; 1; 7	LAU; 2; 9	NÜR; 1; 14	NÜR; 2; 13	HOC; 1; 15	HOC; 2; 15	15th	22
2019	Audi Sport Team Rosberg	Audi RS5 Turbo DTM	Audi RC8 2.0 TFSI I-4 t					MIS; 1; 11	MIS; 2; 5													15th	22

==== Complete F3 Asian Championship results ====
(key) (Races in bold indicate pole position) (Races in italics indicate fastest lap)

Year	Entrant	1	2	3	4	5	6	7	8	9	10	11	12	13	14	15	DC	Points
2019–20	Pinnacle Motorsport	SEP; 1; 14	SEP; 2; 12	SEP; 3; 11	DUB; 1; 7	DUB; 2; 13	DUB; 3; 7	ABU; 1; 4	ABU; 2; 5	ABU; 3; 5	SEP; 1; 4	SEP; 2; 5	SEP; 3; 5	CHA; 1; 3	CHA; 2; 4	CHA; 3; 10	5th	119

==== Complete Formula One results ====
(key) (Races in bold indicate pole position; races in italics indicate fastest lap)

Year	Entrant	Chassis	Engine	1	2	3	4	5	6	7	8	9	10	11	12	13	14	15	16	17	18	19	20	21	22	WDC	Points
2020	Haas F1 Team	Haas VF-20	Ferrari 065 1.6 V6 t	AUT	STY	HUN	GBR	70A	ESP	BEL	ITA	TUS	RUS	EIF	POR	EMI	TUR	BHR	SKH; 17	ABU; 19						23rd	0
2022	Haas F1 Team	Haas VF-22	Ferrari 066/7 1.6 V6 t	BHR	SAU	AUS	EMI	MIA	ESP	MON	AZE	CAN	GBR	AUT	FRA	HUN	BEL	NED	ITA	SIN	JPN	USA	MXC; TD	SAP	ABU; TD	–	–

=== Complete Stock Car Pro Series results ===
Year	Team	Car	1	2	3	4	5	6	7	8	9	10	11	12	13	14	15	16	17	18	19	20	21	22	23	24	Rank	Points
2021	Full Time Bassani	Toyota Corolla	GOI; 1	GOI; 2	INT; 1	INT; 2	VCA; 1	VCA; 2	VCA; 1	VCA; 2	CAS; 1	CAS; 2	CUR; 1	CUR; 2	CUR; 1; 17	CUR; 2; 8	GOI; 1	GOI; 2	GOI; 1	GOI; 2	VCA; 1	VCA; 2	SCZ; 1	SCZ; 2	INT; 1	INT; 2	NC†	0†
2022	Full Time Bassani	Toyota Corolla	INT; 1; 5	GOI; 1	GOI; 2	VCA; 1	VCA; 2	RIO; 1	RIO; 2	BRA; 1	BRA; 2	BRA; 1	BRA; 2	INT; 1	INT; 2	SCZ; 1	SCZ; 2	VCA; 1	VCA; 2	GOI; 1	GOI; 2	GOI; 1	GOI; 2	BRA; 1	BRA; 2		NC†	0†

^{†} As Fittipaldi was a guest driver he was ineligible to score points.

=== Sports car racing results ===
==== Complete 24 Hours of Le Mans results ====
Year	Team	Co-Drivers	Car	Class	Laps	Pos.	Class Pos.
2022	(Poland) Inter Europol Competition	(Denmark) David Heinemeier Hansson (Switzerland) Fabio Scherer	Oreca 07-Gibson	LMP2	364	18th	14th
2023	(United Kingdom) Jota	(Denmark) David Heinemeier Hansson (Denmark) Oliver Rasmussen	Oreca 07-Gibson	LMP2	316	24th	13th
2025	(United Kingdom) United Autosports	(Denmark) David Heinemeier Hansson (Netherlands) Renger van der Zande	Oreca 07-Gibson	LMP2	364	24th	7th
2026	(United Kingdom) Vector Sport	(Republic of Ireland) Ryan Cullen (Grenada) Vladislav Lomko	Oreca 07-Gibson	LMP2	360	18th	4th

==== Complete FIA World Endurance Championship results ====
Year	Entrant	Class	Chassis	Engine	1	2	3	4	5	6	7	8	Rank	Points
2018–19	DragonSpeed	LMP1	BR Engineering BR1	Gibson GL458 4.5 L V8	SPA; DNS	LMS	SIL	FUJ	SHA	SEB	SPA	LMS	NC	0
2022	Inter Europol Competition	LMP2	Oreca 07	Gibson GK428 4.2 L V8	SEB	SPA	LMS; 14	MNZ	FUJ	BHR			NC†	0
2023	Jota	LMP2	Oreca 07	Gibson GK428 4.2 L V8	SEB; 5	ALG; 7	SPA; 9	**LMS**; 9	MNZ; 1	FUJ; 6	BHR; 3		6th	84

^{†} As Fittipaldi was a guest driver, he was ineligible for points.

==== Complete IMSA SportsCar Championship results ====
(key) (Races in bold indicate pole position; races in italics indicate fastest lap)

Year	Team	Class	Make	Engine	1	2	3	4	5	6	7	Rank	Points
2023	Rick Ware Racing	LMP2	Oreca 07	Gibson GK428 4.2 L V8	DAY; 6†	SEB; 7	LGA	WGL; 9	ELK	IMS	PET	22nd	484
2024	Inter Europol by PR1/Mathiasen Motorsports	LMP2	Oreca 07	Gibson GK428 4.2 L V8	DAY; 4	SEB	WGL	MOS	ELK	IMS	PET	40th	312
2025	Pratt Miller Motorsports	LMP2	Oreca 07	Gibson GK428 4.2 L V8	DAY; 9	SEB; 11	WGL; 7	MOS; 6	ELK; 8	IMS; 9	PET; 7	14th	1756
2026	Pratt Miller Motorsports	LMP2	Oreca 07	Gibson GK428 4.2 L V8	DAY; 11	SEB; 9	WGL; 8	MOS; 6	ELK; 11	IMS; 5	PET; 5	9th	1782

^{†} Points only counted towards the Michelin Endurance Cup, and not the overall LMP2 Championship.

==== Complete European Le Mans Series results ====
(key) (Races in bold indicate pole position; results in italics indicate fastest lap)

Year	Entrant	Class	Chassis	Engine	1	2	3	4	5	6	Rank	Points
2021	G-Drive Racing	LMP2	Aurus 01	Gibson GK428 4.2 L V8	CAT; 7	RBR	LEC	MNZ	SPA	ALG	26th	6
2022	Inter Europol Competition	LMP2	Oreca 07	Gibson GK428 4.2 L V8	LEC; 11	IMO; 9	MNZ; 11	CAT; 16	SPA; 2	ALG; 4	10th	32
2025	Vector Sport	LMP2	Oreca 07	Gibson GK428 4.2 L V8	CAT; 3	LEC; 4	IMO; 12	SPA; 7	SIL; 3	ALG; 7	4th	54
2026	Vector Sport	LMP2	Oreca 07	Gibson GK428 4.2 L V8	CAT; 6	LEC; 5	IMO; 6	SPA; 9	SIL; 7	ALG; 5	8th	44

== See also ==
- Formula One drivers from Brazil

Sporting positions
Preceded by Chris Middlehurst	Protyre Formula Renault Championship; Champion; 2014	Succeeded by None (Series ended)
Preceded by Toby Sowery	MRF Challenge Formula 2000; Champion; 2015–16	Succeeded by Harrison Newey
Preceded by Tom Dillmann	World Series Formula V8 3.5; Champion; 2017	Succeeded by None (Series ended)
