= S. H. Barnicoat Monuments =

- U.S. National Register of Historic Places
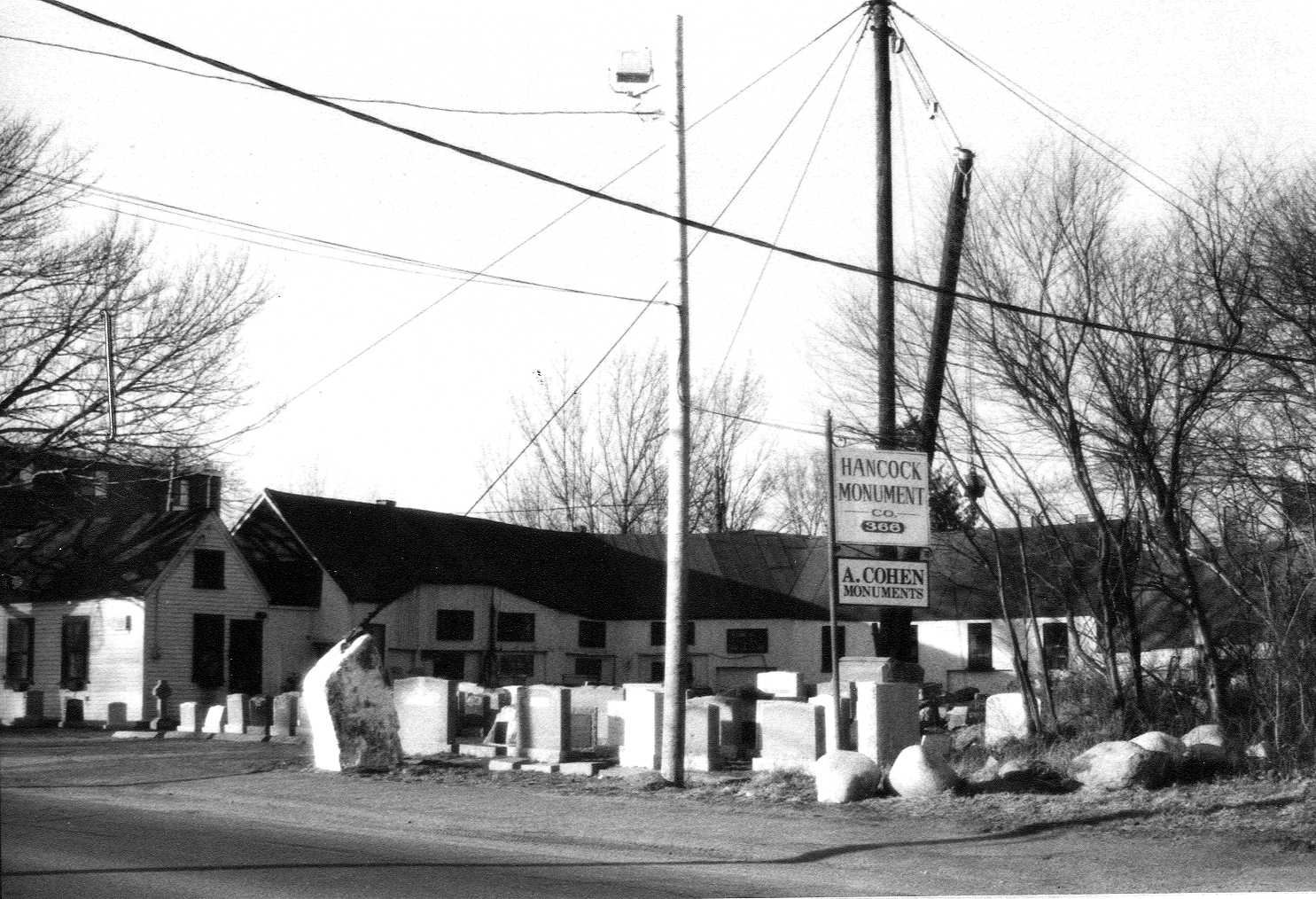
- Photo c. 1986

- Location within Massachusetts Location within the United States
- Location: 114 Columbia St., Quincy, Massachusetts
- Coordinates: 42°14′2.9″N 71°0′39.5″W
- Area: 0.4 acres (0.16 ha)
- Built: 1890
- MPS: Quincy MRA
- NRHP reference No.: 89001325
- Added to NRHP: September 20, 1989

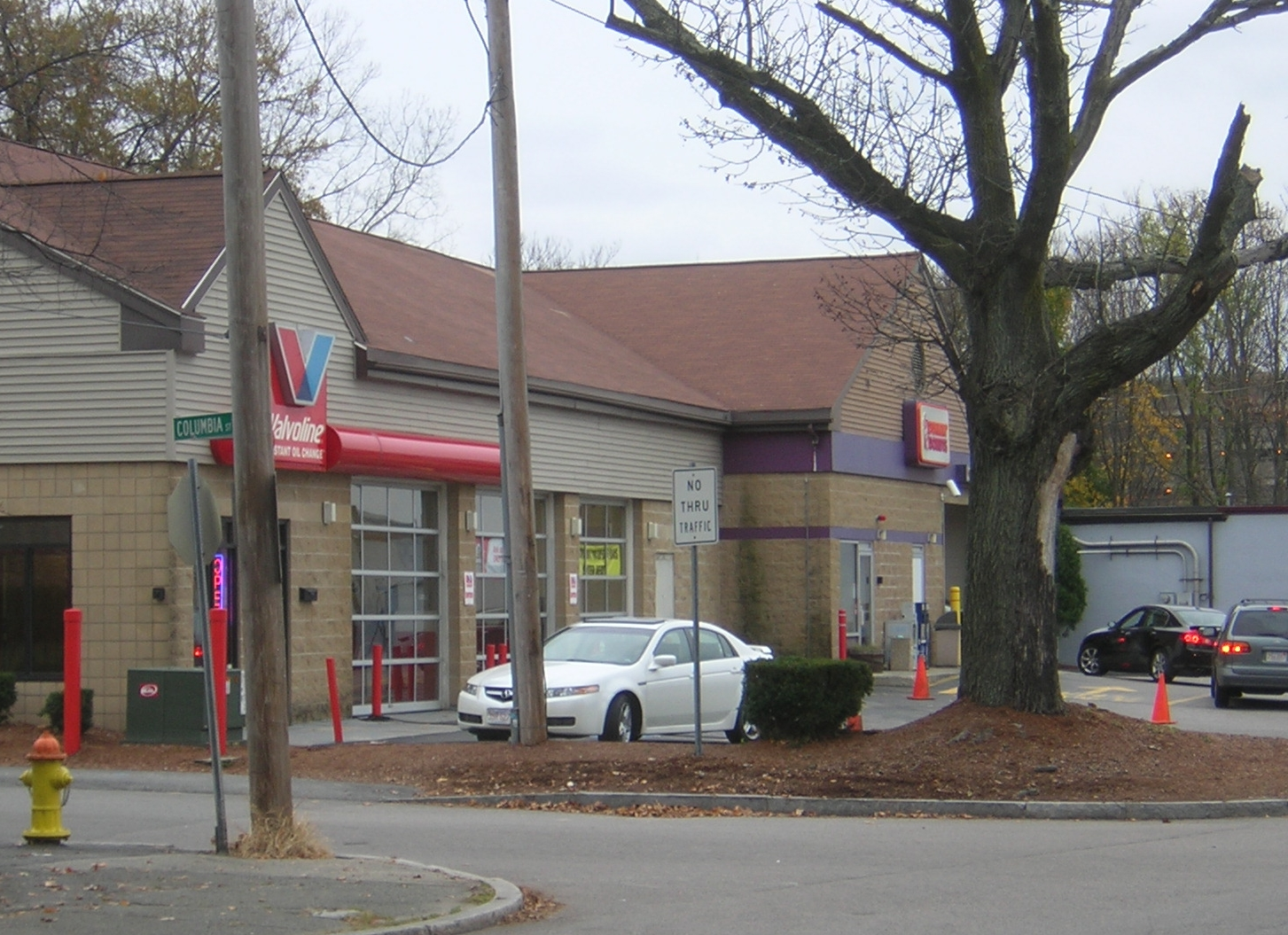
Former site of Barnicoat Monuments, 2009

S. H. Barnicoat Monuments, S. H. Barnicoat Granite Works, or, more recently, Hancock Monument Co. was a granite workshop at 114 Columbia Street, at the corner of Centre Street, in Quincy, Massachusetts. It was housed in a rare surviving 19th-century granite workshop building dating to the 1890s, and was, at the time of its listing on the National Register of Historic Places in 1989, one of the only 19th-century granite workshops operating in the city. Its main feature was a derrick more than 90 feet (27 m) tall that was used to move granite around the property.

The workshop has since been demolished and replaced by a Valvoline lubrication garage and Dunkin Donuts.

== See also ==
- National Register of Historic Places listings in Quincy, Massachusetts
