= Peter Barnicoat =

English cricketer

William Charles Peter Barnicoat (19 June 1932 – January 2025) was an English cricketer. He was a right-handed batsman and right-arm medium-pace bowler who played for Cornwall. He was born in Truro.

Barnicoat, who made his Minor Counties Championship debut for the team in 1959, made his only List A appearance during the 1970 season, his last at the club, against Glamorgan. From the lower-middle order, he scored 2 runs. He took figures of 1-24 from 12 overs of bowling.

Barnicoat died in January 2025, at the age of 92.
