= Ben Barnicoat =

British racing driver (born 1996)

- Barnicoat at Silverstone Circuit in 2026.
- Born: Ben George Barnicoat; 20 December 1996 (age 29); Chesterfield, Derbyshire, England
- Nationality: (United Kingdom) British

IMSA Sportscar Championship career
- Debut season: 2021
- Current team: Vasser Sullivan
- Categorisation: FIA Gold (until 2021); FIA Platinum (2022–)
- Car number: 14
- Former teams: Inception
- Starts: 51
- Championships: 1 (2023)
- Wins: 9
- Podiums: 21
- Poles: 12
- Fastest laps: 3
- Best finish: 1st in 2023 (GTD Pro)

FIA World Endurance Championship career
- Debut season: 2022
- Current team: Vasser Sullivan
- Car number: 78
- Former teams: Project 1
- Starts: 10
- Championships: 0
- Wins: 0
- Podiums: 2
- Poles: 1
- Fastest laps: 0
- Best finish: 9th in 2022 (LMGTE Am)

24 Hours of Le Mans career
- Years: 2021–2024
- Teams: Inception, Project 1, AF Corse
- Best finish: 18th (2024)
- Class wins: 1 (2024)

Previous series
- 2019, 2023; 2018, 2023; 2020; 2016–2018; 2017; 2016; 2015; 2014–2015; 2014–2015; 2014; 2014; 2013: ELMS; British GT; FIA Formula 3; Blancpain GT; Pirelli World Challenge; FIA F3 European; BRDC F4 Autumn; Formula Renault Eurocup; Formula Renault 2.0 Alps; Formula Renault NEC; British Formula Renault; British FR Autumn Cup

Championship titles
- 2022; 2015; 2014; 2013: ALMS – GT; BRDC F4 Autumn; Formula Renault NEC; British FR Autumn Cup

Awards
- 2014: Autosport British Club Driver of the Year

Ben George Barnicoat (born 20 December 1996) is a British racing driver who competes in the IMSA SportsCar Championship for Vasser Sullivan and serves as a factory driver for Lexus.

Born and raised in Chesterfield, Barnicoat began competitive kart racing aged nine. After a successful karting career—in which he was crowned European champion in 2012—Barnicoat graduated to junior formulae. A member of the Racing Steps Foundation, he won titles at Formula Renault and Formula 4 level for Fortec, and reached the FIA Formula 3 European Championship with HitechGP in 2016.

Barnicoat transitioned to sportscar racing in 2017, taking a Blancpain GT Series podium and two Gulf 12 Hours wins as a McLaren works driver until 2021. Upon joining Lexus in 2022, Barnicoat won the IMSA SportsCar Championship and 12 Hours of Sebring in GTD Pro alongside Jack Hawksworth. Barnicoat has also raced in LMP2 for Carlin and AF Corse, most notably winning the 24 Hours of Le Mans in LMP2 Pro-Am for the latter in 2024.

== Career ==
=== Karting ===
Born in Chesterfield, Barnicoat began his racing career in karting at the age of nine. He competed at local kart tracks in the United Kingdom during his early career, including Wombwell Kart Track in Barnsley, and has cited fellow British driver and eventual IMSA teammate Jack Hawksworth as one of the older competitors he watched and learned from.

In 2007, he clinched the WTP Cadet Open and Motors TV Cadet Karting Championship titles as well as becoming WTP "Little Green Man" Vice Champion. In 2008, he graduated to KF3 category in which he participated in the MSA Formula Kart Starts championship and Kartmasters GP. He did remarkably well in both, securing fourth in Formula Kart Stars and seventh at Kartmasters. Barnicoat returned the year after and won Kartmasters GP, Formula Kart Stars and finished Vice-Champion in the Super One Junior Championship. By 2012, Barnicoat had claimed the CIK-FIA KF2 European Championship too. In 2015, Barnicoat claimed the Kart Masters GP Trophy in both the Senior Rotax and Iame X30 class, becoming the first driver to take two Kart Masters Championships in one day. Barnicoat has since continued to compete in the Kart Masters event and is now the most successful driver with nine titles to his name. He claimed the Senior X30 in 2017/18/19 and the Senior Rotax in 2019.

=== Formula Renault ===
In 2013, Barnicoat made his début in single-seaters, taking part in the Protyre Formula Renault Autumn Cup for Fortec Motorsports, and won the cup with two wins.

Barnicoat continued his collaboration with Fortec into 2014, competing in the Formula Renault 2.0 NEC and Formula Renault 2.0 Alps series.

=== European Formula 3 ===
On 15 November 2015, it was announced that Barnicoat would race with Prema Powerteam for the 2016 season. However, it was later announced that Barnicoat would switch to race with HitechGP.

=== Sportscar career ===
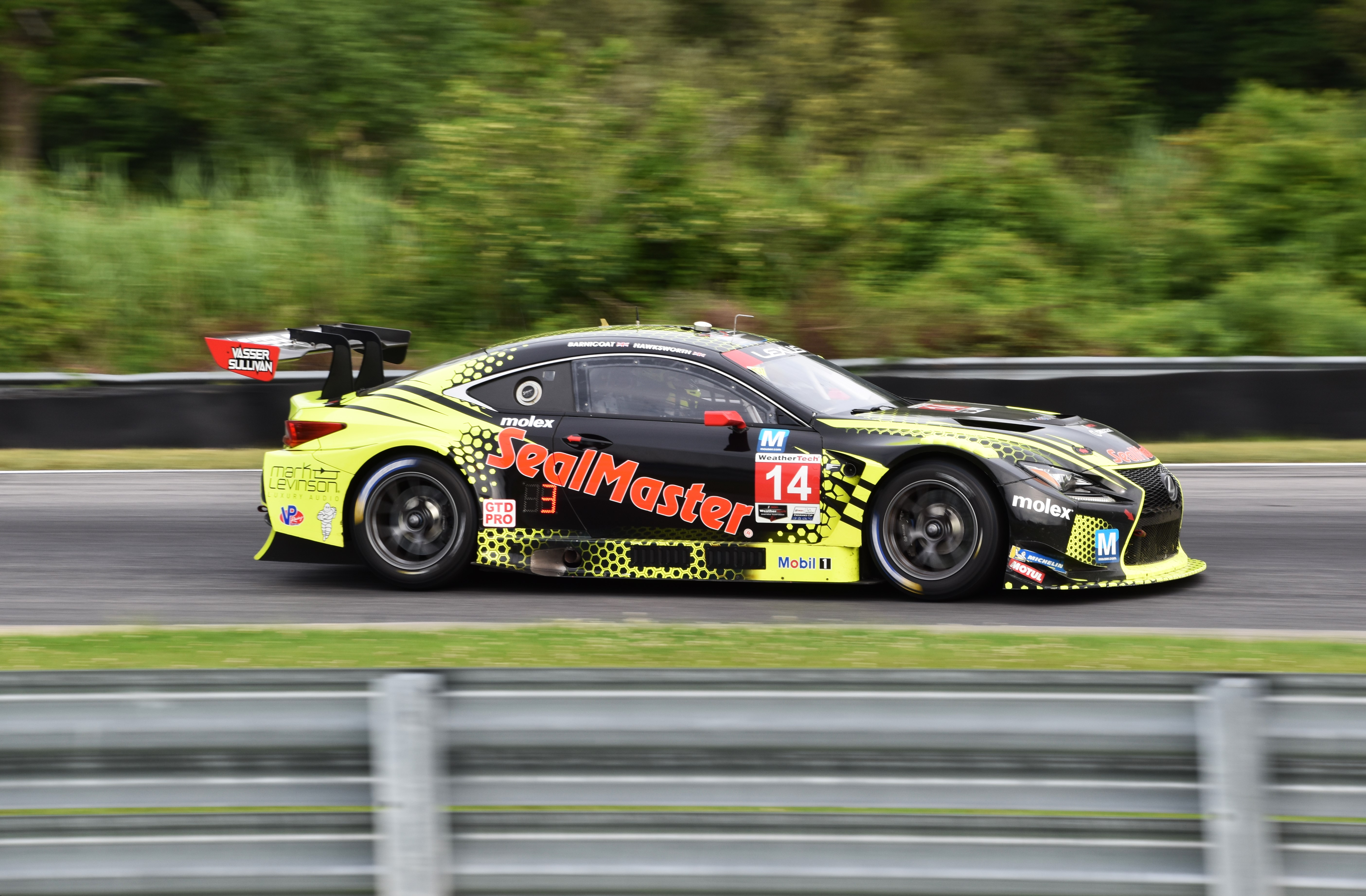
Barnicoat finished second at the 2023 Northeast Grand Prix.

Barnicoat made the transition from single-seaters across into GT racing in 2017. The following six seasons have seen him compete - and win - on some of the biggest stages in motorsport. Appointed Factory Driver with McLaren a year later, Barnicoat took on the pivotal role in the development of the brand's latest range of GT racing cars. Barnicoat has also proven himself on the world stage with podium results at the Bathurst 12 Hour, Asian Le Mans Series, Intercontinental GT Challenge, GT World Challenge Europe, Pirelli World Challenge & the British GT Championship in both GT3 and GT4 classes, as well as back-to-back outright victories at the Gulf 12 Hours.

In 2019, Barnicoat also made his LMP2 debut with Thunderhead Carlin Motorsport, competing in the European Le Mans Series, and finishing as runner up in the Asian Le Mans Series with two victories during the season.

The No. 80 AF Corse Oreca 07 that Barnicoat drove during the 2022 24 Hours of Le Mans

2022 saw Barnicoat appointed as Factory Driver with Lexus Racing USA and Vasser Sullivan Racing, contesting the IMSA SportsCar Championship with the Lexus RC F GT3 with Jack Hawksworth. In his debut season, Barnicoat scored notable victories: the IMSA SportsCar Weekend, and a season finale victory at Petit Le Mans, en route to finishing second in the championship. Alongside this impressive debut full season of US racing, Barnicoat also secured the Asian Le Mans Series GT title, he successfully defended his title at the Gulf 12 Hours with 2 Seas Motorsport, and campaigned at the 24 Hours of Le Mans for a second year.

2023 saw Barnicoat return to the IMSA championship, delivering an impressive run of form. Nine podiums, including two victories, from the season's 11 rounds delivered a first GTD Pro championship title for Lexus Racing, Vasser Sullivan, and Barnicoat's only in his second year competing in the championship. He completed the year by taking part in the Official Rookie Test for the World Endurance Championship, testing the Toyota GR010 Hybrid Hypercar.

Barnicoat returned in 2024 to defend his IMSA title, taking victories at the 12 Hours of Sebring and on the streets of Long Beach, with an additional podium finish in Detroit. Alongside his GT3 efforts, Barnicoat also secured LMP2 Pro Am victory at the 24 Hours of Le Mans, and made his Super Formula debut in Japan with Itochu Enex Team IMPUL at Autopolis.

=== FIA Formula 3 Championship ===
On 30 July 2020, Carlin Buzz Racing announced that Enaam Ahmed and his sponsors had separated from the team, and that Barnicoat would be replacing him at the team. In four races, he scored one point - a tenth-place finish in the first race of Silverstone.

== Karting record ==
=== Karting career summary ===
Season	Series	Team	Position
2006	Kartmasters British GP - WTP Cadet		4th
2007	Kartmasters British GP - WTP Cadet		10th
2007	British Kart Championship - WTP Cadet		2nd
2008	Super One Series - Comer Cadet		3rd
2008	BRDC Stars of Tomorrow - Cadet		5th
2008	Kartmasters British GP - WTP Cadet		5th
2008	British Kart Championship - WTP Cadet		1st
2009	ABkC 'O' Plate - KF3		16th
2009	Kartmasters British GP - KF3		7th
2009	Super One Series - KF3		16th
2009	Formula Kart Stars - KF3		4th
2010	Super One Series - KF3		2nd
2010	Formula Kart Stars - KF3		1st
2010	Kartmasters British GP - KF3		1st
2011	FIA Karting Academy Trophy		2nd
2011	Kartmasters British GP - KF3		1st
2011	Super One Series - KF3		3rd
2012	17° South Garda Winter Cup - KF2		12th
2012	WSK Euro Series - KF2	ART Grand Prix	4th
2012	CIK-FIA European Championship KF2	ART Grand Prix	1st
2012	CIK-FIA U18 World Championship		9th
2012	Super One Series - KF2		1st
2012	FIA Karting World Cup - KF2		6th
2013	Kartmasters British GP - Rotax Senior		28th
2013	WSK Super Master Series - KF		2nd
2013	18° South Garda Winter Cup - KF2		11th
2013	WSK Euro Series - KF	ART Grand Prix Srl	3rd
2013	CIK-FIA European Championship - KF	ART Grand Prix Srl	13th
2015	South Garda Winter Cup - KF	Birel ART	5th
2015	CIK-FIA European Championship - KF	Birel ART Srl	24th
2015	Kartmasters British GP - Rotax Senior		1st
2015	Kartmasters British GP - X30 Senior		1st
2017	SKUSA SuperNationals XXI - X30 Senior	Fullerton USA	2nd
2017	Kartmasters British GP - X30 Senior	Fullerton	1st
2018	Kartmasters British GP - X30 Senior	Mick Barrett Racing	1st
2019	Kartmasters British GP - Rotax Senior	Mick Barrett Racing	1st
2019	Kartmasters British GP - X30 Senior	Mick Barrett Racing	1st
2019	IAME International Final - X30 Senior		2nd

== Racing record ==
=== Racing career summary ===
Season	Series	Team	Races	Wins	Poles	FLaps	Podiums	Points	Position
2013	Protyre Formula Renault Autumn Cup	Fortec Motorsports	3	2	3	2	3	96	**1st**
2014	Formula Renault 2.0 NEC	Fortec Motorsports	15	2	1	1	5	258	**1st**
2014	Formula Renault 2.0 Alps	Fortec Motorsports	6	0	0	0	0	32	14th
2014	Protyre Formula Renault Championship	Fortec Motorsports	3	0	0	0	0	60	13rd
2014	Eurocup Formula Renault 2.0	Fortec Motorsports	2	0	0	0	0	0	NC†
2015	Eurocup Formula Renault 2.0	Fortec Motorsports	17	3	2	1	6	174	4th
2015	Formula Renault 2.0 Alps	Fortec Motorsports	6	1	0	1	2	0	NC†
2015	BRDC Formula 4 Autumn Trophy	Fortec Motorsports	8	3	2	5	6	211	**1st**
2016	FIA Formula 3 European Championship	Hitech GP	30	2	0	0	3	134	9th
2016	Blancpain GT Series Endurance Cup	Belgian Audi Club Team WRT	1	0	0	0	0	0	NC
2017	Blancpain GT Series Sprint Cup	Strakka Racing	10	0	0	2	0	2	29th
2017	Blancpain GT Series Endurance Cup	Strakka Racing	5	0	0	1	0	2	43rd
2017	Intercontinental GT Challenge	Tekno Autosports/McLaren GT	2	0	0	0	0	15	9th
2017	Pirelli World Challenge - GT	K-PAX Racing	10	0	0	0	3	140	19th
2017	SprintX GT Championship Series	K-PAX Racing	7	0	0	0	3	140	7th
2018	British GT Championship - GT4	Track-Club	5	1	0	0	1	43	13th
2018	British GT Championship - GT4	Balfe Motorsport/PMW Expo Racing	1	0	0	0	0	43	13th
2018	Blancpain GT Series Endurance Cup	Garage 59	5	0	0	0	1	19	24th
2018	Intercontinental GT Challenge	Garage 59	2	0	0	0	0	6	22nd
2019	European Le Mans Series - LMP2	Thunderhead Carlin Racing	5	0	0	0	0	3	25th
2019	International GT Open	Teo Martín Motorsport	2	0	0	0	0	0	43rd
2019	International GT Open - Pro-Am	Teo Martín Motorsport	2	0	0	0	0	2	21st
2019–20	Asian Le Mans Series - LMP2	Thunderhead Carlin Racing	4	2	2	1	4	82	**2nd**
2020	FIA Formula 3 Championship	Carlin Buzz Racing	4	0	0	0	0	1	22nd
2020	Euroformula Open Championship	Carlin Motorsport	2	1	1	0	2	41	13rd
2020	GT World Challenge Europe Endurance Cup	Ema Group/Team 59Racing	1	0	0	0	0	0	NC
2020	Le Mans Cup - LMP3	Cool Racing	1	0	0	0	0	10	23rd
2021	GT World Challenge Europe Sprint Cup	Jota Sport	7	0	2	1	0	19	17th
2021	GT World Challenge Europe Endurance Cup	Jota Sport	4	0	0	0	0	13	18th
2021	Gulf 12 Hours	2 Seas Motorsport	1	1	1				**1st**
2021	Asian Le Mans Series - GT	Inception Racing with Optimum Motorsport	4	0	0	1	2	45	4th
2021	IMSA SportsCar Championship - GTD	Inception Racing with Optimum Motorsport	1	0	0	0	0	209	63rd
2022	IMSA SportsCar Championship - GTD Pro	Vasser Sullivan Racing	10	2	2	0	6	3277	**2nd**
2022	IMSA SportsCar Championship - GTD	Vasser Sullivan Racing	1	1	1	0	1	385	45th
2022	Gulf 12 Hours	2 Seas Motorsport	1	1					**1st**
2022	FIA World Endurance Championship - LMGTE Am	Team Project 1	6	0	0	0	2	55	9th
2022	24 Hours of Le Mans - LMGTE Am	Team Project 1	1	0	0	0	0	N/A	DNF
2022	Asian Le Mans Series - GT	Inception Racing	4	1	1	3	3	70	**1st**
2023	IMSA SportsCar Championship - GTD Pro	Vasser Sullivan Racing	11	2	4	1	9	3760	**1st**
2023	European Le Mans Series - LMP2 Pro-Am	AF Corse	4	1	0	0	4	73	5th
2023	24 Hours of Le Mans - LMP2	AF Corse	1	0	0	0	0	N/A	DNF
2023	British GT Championship - GT3	Inception Racing	1	0	0	0	0	0	NC†
2023	Nürburgring Endurance Series - VT2-FWD	Walkenhorst Motorsport	1	0	0	0	0	0	NC†
2024	IMSA SportsCar Championship - GTD Pro	Vasser Sullivan	10	1	1	0	2	2859	5th
2024	IMSA SportsCar Championship - GTD	Vasser Sullivan	1	1	1	0	1	385	46th
2024	Super Formula	Itochu Enex Team Impul	1	0	0	1	0	0	23rd
2024	GT World Challenge Europe Endurance Cup	Optimum Motorsport	1	0	0	0	0	0	NC
2024	24 Hours of Le Mans - LMP2 Pro-Am	AF Corse	1	1	0	0	1	N/A	**1st**
2024–25	Asian Le Mans Series - GT	2 Seas Motorsport	6	1	0	0	1	43	6th
2025	IMSA SportsCar Championship - GTD Pro	Vasser Sullivan Racing	7	0	0	1	0	1790	13rd
2025	FIA World Endurance Championship - LMGT3	Akkodis ASP Team	4	0	1	0	0	21	17th
2025	GT World Challenge Europe Endurance Cup	2 Seas Motorsport	1	0	0	0	0	0	NC
2025	Gulf 12 Hours	Optimum Motorsport	1	0	0	0	0	N/A	4th
2026	IMSA SportsCar Championship - GTD Pro	Vasser Sullivan Racing	10	2	3	1	2	2779	7th
2026	British GT Championship - GT3	Optimum Motorsport	8	2	0	0	4	132.5	**2nd**
2026	International GT Open	Optimum Motorsport	1	0	0	0	0	8	34th
2026	Bathurst 12 Hour	Optimum Motorsport	1	0	0	0	0	N/A	DNF
2026	24 Hours of Le Mans - LMP2 Pro-Am	AF Corse	1	0	0	0	1	N/A	**2nd**
2026	European Le Mans Series - LMP2	Algarve Pro Racing	1	1	0	1	1	25	13th
2026	GT World Challenge Europe Endurance Cup	Mercedes-AMG Team Verstappen Racing	1	0	0	0	0	0	NC†

^{†} As Barnicoat was a guest driver, he was ineligible for points. ^{*} Season still in progress.

=== Complete Formula Renault 2.0 Northern European Cup results ===
(key) (Races in bold indicate pole position; races in italics indicate fastest lap)

Year	Entrant	1	2	3	4	5	6	7	8	9	10	11	12	13	14	15	16	17	DC	Points
2014	Fortec Motorsports	MNZ; 1; 9	MNZ; 2; 4	SIL; 1; 6	SIL; 2; 18	HOC; 1; 2	**HOC**; **2**; 1	HOC; 3; 6	SPA; 1; 2	SPA; 2; 5	ASS; 1; 2	ASS; 2 Ret	MST; 1; 1	MST; 2; 7	MST; 3 C	NÜR; 1; 4	NÜR; 2; 4	NÜR; 3 C	1st	258

=== Complete Formula Renault 2.0 Alps Series results ===
(key) (Races in bold indicate pole position; races in italics indicate fastest lap)

Year	Team	1	2	3	4	5	6	7	8	9	10	11	12	13	14	15	16	Pos	Points
2014	Fortec Motorsports	IMO; 1	IMO; 2	PAU; 1; 5	PAU; 2 Ret	RBR; 1	RBR; 2	SPA; 1 Ret	SPA; 2; 4	MNZ; 1; 5	MNZ; 2; 21	MUG; 1	MUG; 2	JER; 1	JER; 2			14th	32
2015	Fortec Motorsports	IMO; 1; 4	IMO; 2; 5	PAU; 1; 9	PAU; 2 Ret	RBR; 1	RBR; 2	RBR; 3	SPA; 1	SPA; 2	MNZ; 1	MNZ; 2	MNZ; 3	MIS; 1	MIS; 2	JER; 1; 3	JER; 2; 1	NC†	0

† As Barnicoat was a guest driver, he was ineligible for points

=== Complete Eurocup Formula Renault 2.0 results ===
(key) (Races in bold indicate pole position) (Races in italics indicate fastest lap)

Year	Entrant	1	2	3	4	5	6	7	8	9	10	11	12	13	14	15	16	17	Pos	Points
2014	Fortec Motorsports	ALC; 1	ALC; 2	SPA; 1	SPA; 2	SIL; 1	SIL; 2	NÜR; 1	NÜR; 2	HUN; 1	HUN; 2	LEC; 1	LEC; 2	JER; 1 Ret	JER; 2 DNS				NC†	0
2015	Fortec Motorsports	ALC; 1; 2	ALC; 2; 5	ALC; 3 Ret	SPA; 1; 25†	SPA; 2; 4	HUN; 1; 2	HUN; 2; 8	SIL; 1 Ret	SIL; 2; 23†	SIL; 3; 13	NÜR; 1; 4	**NÜR**; **2**; 1	LMS; 1; 1	LMS; 2; 5	JER; 1; 22	JER; 2; 3	**JER**; **3**; 1	4th	174

=== Complete FIA Formula 3 European Championship results ===
(key) (Races in bold indicate pole position) (Races in italics indicate fastest lap)

Year	Entrant	Engine	1	2	3	4	5	6	7	8	9	10	11	12	13	14	15	16	17	18	19	20	21	22	23	24	25	26	27	28	29	30	DC	Pts
2016	HitechGP	Mercedes	LEC; 1; 4	LEC; 2 Ret	LEC; 3; 11	HUN; 1; 9	HUN; 2; 10	HUN; 3; 1	PAU; 1; 1	PAU; 2; 5	PAU; 3; 11	RBR; 1; 10	RBR; 2; 15	RBR; 3; 5	NOR; 1; 5	NOR; 2 Ret	NOR; 3 DSQ	ZAN; 1; 18	ZAN; 2; 8	ZAN; 3; 9	SPA; 1; 3	SPA; 2; 11	SPA; 3; 20	NÜR; 1; 9	NÜR; 2 Ret	NÜR; 3; 10	IMO; 1; 8	IMO; 2 Ret	IMO; 3; 13	HOC; 1; 18	HOC; 2; 9	HOC; 3; 7	9th	134

=== Complete GT World Challenge Europe results ===
==== GT World Challenge Europe Endurance Cup ====
Year	Team	Car	Class	1	2	3	4	5	6	7	Pos.	Points
2016	Belgian Audi Club Team WRT	Audi R8 LMS	Pro	MNZ	SIL	LEC	SPA; 6H	SPA; 12H	SPA; 24H	NÜR; 29	NC	0
2017	Strakka Racing	McLaren 650S GT3	Pro	MNZ; 9	SIL; 34	LEC; Ret	SPA; 6H; 60	SPA; 12H; 60	SPA; 24H; Ret	CAT; 14	42nd	2
2018	Garage 59	McLaren 650S GT3	Pro	MNZ; 15	SIL; 15	LEC; 3	SPA; 6H; 41	SPA; 12H; 28	SPA; 24H; 22	CAT; 26	24th	19
2020	Ema Group/Team 59Racing	McLaren 720S GT3	Pro	IMO; 35	NÜR	SPA; 6H	SPA; 12H	SPA; 24H	LEC		NC	0
2021	Jota Sport	McLaren 720S GT3	Pro	MON; Ret	LEC; 16	SPA; 6H; 4	SPA; 12H; 9	SPA; 24H; 7	NÜR	CAT; 13	18th	13
2024	Optimum Motorsport	McLaren 720S GT3 Evo	Bronze	LEC	SPA; 6H; 45	SPA; 12H; 39	SPA; 24H; 23	NÜR	MNZ	JED	36th	4
2025	2 Seas Motorsport	Mercedes-AMG GT3 Evo	Bronze	LEC	MNZ	SPA; 6H	SPA; 12H	SPA; 24H	NÜR; 31	CAT	16th	25
2026	Mercedes-AMG Team Verstappen Racing	Mercedes-AMG GT3 Evo	Pro	LEC	MNZ	SPA; 6H	SPA; 12H	SPA; 24H	NÜR	ALG; 9	NC‡	0‡

==== GT World Challenge Europe Sprint Cup ====
Year	Team	Car	Class	1	2	3	4	5	6	7	8	9	10	Pos.	Points
2017	Strakka Racing	McLaren 650S GT3	Pro	MIS; QR; 22	MIS; CR; 18	BRH; QR; 6	BRH; CR; 10	ZOL; QR; 10	ZOL; CR; 28	HUN; QR; 20	HUN; CR; 24	NÜR; QR; Ret	NÜR; CR; 25	29th	2
2021	Jota Sport	McLaren 720S GT3	Pro	MAG; 1; 13	MAG; 2; 4	ZAN; 1	ZAN; 2	MIS; 1; 22	MIS; 2; 8	**BRH**; **1** Ret	BRH; 2 DNS	**VAL**; **1**; 22†	VAL; 2; 4	17th	19

^{†} Driver did not finish the race, but was classified as he completed over 90% of the race distance.

=== Complete British GT Championship results ===
(key) (Races in bold indicate pole position) (Races in italics indicate fastest lap)

Year	Team	Car	Class	1	2	3	4	5	6	7	8	9	DC	Points
2018	Track-Club	McLaren 570S GT4	GT4	OUL; 1; 14	OUL; 2; 18	ROC; 1; 28	SNE; 1; 16	SNE; 2 Ret	SIL; 1	SPA; 1 DNS	BRH; 1		13th	43
2018	Balfe Motorsport/PMW Expo Racing	McLaren 570S GT4	GT4									DON; 1 Ret	13th	43
2023	Inception Racing	McLaren 720S GT3 Evo	GT3	OUL; 1	OUL; 2	SIL; 1; 10	DON; 1	SNE; 1	SNE; 2	ALG; 1	BRH; 1	DON; 1	NC†	0†
2026	Optimum Motorsport	McLaren 720S GT3 Evo	GT3	SIL; 1; 7	OUL; 1; 7	OUL; 2; 1	SPA; 1; 3	SNE; 1; 4	SNE; 2; 1	DON; 1 Ret	BRH; 1; 2		2nd	132.5

^{†} As Barnicoat was a guest driver, he was ineligible for points.

=== Complete European Le Mans Series results ===
(key) (Races in bold indicate pole position; results in italics indicate fastest lap)

Year	Entrant	Class	Chassis	Engine	1	2	3	4	5	6	Rank	Points
2019	Thunderhead Carlin Racing	LMP2	Dallara P217	Gibson GK428 4.2 L V8	LEC; 11	MNZ; 11	CAT; 9	SIL; Ret	SPA	ALG; Ret	25th	3
2023	AF Corse	LMP2 Pro-Am	Oreca 07	Gibson GK428 4.2 L V8	CAT; 2	LEC; 3	ARA	SPA	ALG; 3	ALG; 1	5th	73
2026	Algarve Pro Racing	LMP2	Oreca 07	Gibson GK428 4.2 L V8	CAT	LEC	IMO	SPA	SIL; 1	ALG	13th*	25*

=== Complete FIA Formula 3 Championship results ===
(key) (Races in bold indicate pole position) (Races in italics indicate fastest lap)

Year	Entrant	1	2	3	4	5	6	7	8	9	10	11	12	13	14	15	16	17	18	DC	Points
2020	Carlin Buzz Racing	RBR; FEA	RBR; SPR	RBR; FEA	RBR; SPR	HUN; FEA	HUN; SPR	SIL; FEA; 20	SIL; SPR; 12	SIL; FEA; 10	SIL; SPR; Ret	CAT; FEA	CAT; SPR	SPA; FEA	SPA; SPR	MNZ; FEA	MNZ; SPR	MUG; FEA	MUG; SPR	22nd	1

=== Complete 24 Hours of Le Mans results ===
Year	Team	Co-Drivers	Car	Class	Laps	Pos.	Class Pos.
2021	(United Kingdom) Inception Racing	(United States) Brendan Iribe (United Kingdom) Ollie Millroy	Ferrari 488 GTE Evo	GTE; Am	327	41st	12th
2022	(Germany) Team Project 1	(United States) Brendan Iribe (United Kingdom) Ollie Millroy	Porsche 911 RSR-19	GTE; Am	241	DNF	DNF
2023	(Italy) AF Corse	(France) Norman Nato (France) François Perrodo	Oreca 07-Gibson	LMP2	183	DNF	DNF
2023	(Italy) AF Corse	(France) Norman Nato (France) François Perrodo	Oreca 07-Gibson	LMP2 Pro-Am	183	DNF	DNF
2024	(Italy) AF Corse	(France) François Perrodo (Argentina) Nicolás Varrone	Oreca 07-Gibson	LMP2	297	18th	4th
2024	(Italy) AF Corse	(France) François Perrodo (Argentina) Nicolás Varrone	Oreca 07-Gibson	LMP2 Pro-Am	297	18th	**1st**
2026	(Italy) AF Corse	(France) François Perrodo (France) Matthieu Vaxivière	Oreca 07-Gibson	LMP2	357	23rd	9th
2026	(Italy) AF Corse	(France) François Perrodo (France) Matthieu Vaxivière	Oreca 07-Gibson	LMP2 Pro-Am	357	23rd	**2nd**

=== Complete IMSA SportsCar Championship results ===
(key) (Races in bold indicate pole position; races in italics indicate fastest lap)

Year	Entrant	Class	Make	Engine	1	2	3	4	5	6	7	8	9	10	11	12	Rank	Points	Ref
2021	Inception Racing with Optimum Motorsport	GTD	McLaren 720S GT3	McLaren M840T 4.0 L Turbo V8	DAY	SEB	MDO	DET	WGL	WGL	LIM	ELK	LGA	LBH	VIR	PET; 12	63rd	209	
2022	VasserSullivan	GTD Pro	Lexus RC F GT3	Toyota 2UR-GSE 5.4 L V8	DAY; 4	SEB; 7	LBH; 2	LGA; 2			WGL; 4	MOS; 6	LIM; 3	**ELK**; 1	VIR; 3	**PET**; 1	2nd	3277	
2022	VasserSullivan	GTD	Lexus RC F GT3	Toyota 2UR-GSE 5.4 L V8					MDO	**DET**; 1							45th	385	
2023	Vasser Sullivan Racing	GTD Pro	Lexus RC F GT3	Toyota 2UR-GSE 5.4 L V8	DAY; 3	SEB; 2	**LBH**; 1	LGA; 2	WGL; 1	**MOS**; 4	LIM; 2	ELK; 2	**VIR**; 2	IMS; 3	**PET**; 8		1st	3760	
2024	Vasser Sullivan	GTD Pro	Lexus RC F GT3	Toyota 2UR-GSE 5.4 L V8	DAY; 11	**SEB**; 1		LGA; 4	DET; 2	WGL; 4	MOS; 9	ELK; 9	VIR; 6	IMS; 4	PET; 13		5th	2859	
2024	Vasser Sullivan	GTD	Lexus RC F GT3	Toyota 2UR-GSE 5.4 L V8			**LBH**; 1										46th	385	
2025	Vasser Sullivan Racing	GTD Pro	Lexus RC F GT3	Toyota 2UR-GSE 5.4 L V8	DAY; 11	SEB	LGA	DET	WGL; 8	MOS; 8	ELK; 9	VIR; 8	IMS; 5	PET; 6			13th	1790	
2026	Vasser Sullivan Racing	GTD Pro	Lexus RC F GT3	Toyota 2UR-GSE 5.4 L V8	DAY; 10	**SEB**; 11	**LGA**; 9	DET; 6	**WGL**; 1	MOS; 1	ELK; 6	VIR; 7	IMS; 5	PET; 10			7th	2779	

=== Complete FIA World Endurance Championship results ===
(key) (Races in bold indicate pole position; races in italics indicate fastest lap)

Year	Entrant	Class	Car	Engine	1	2	3	4	5	6	7	8	Rank	Points
2022	Team Project 1	LMGTE Am	Porsche 911 RSR-19	Porsche 4.2 L Flat-6	SEB; 3	SPA; Ret	LMS; Ret	MNZ; 10	FUJ; 8	BHR; 2			9th	55
2025	Akkodis ASP Team	LMGT3	Lexus RC F GT3	Toyota 2UR-GSE 5.4 L V8	QAT; 4	IMO	SPA	LMS	SÃO	COA; 14	FUJ; 9	**BHR**; Ret	17th	21

=== Complete Super Formula results ===
Year	Team	Engine	1	2	3	4	5	6	7	8	9	DC	Points
2024	Itochu Enex Team Impul	Toyota	SUZ	AUT; 13	SUG	FUJ	MOT	FUJ	FUJ	SUZ	SUZ	23rd	0

Sporting positions
Preceded by Seb Morris (Winter Series)	Protyre Formula Renault Autumn Cup; Champion; 2013	Succeeded by None (Series ended)
Preceded by Matt Parry	Formula Renault 2.0 NEC; Champion; 2014	Succeeded by Louis Delétraz
Preceded by Will Palmer (Winter Series)	BRDC Formula 4 Autumn Trophy; Champion; 2015	Succeeded by Enaam Ahmed (BRDC British Formula 3)
Preceded by Ralf Bohn; Alfred Renauer; Robert Renauer	Asian Le Mans Series; GT Champion; 2022; With: Brendan Iribe & Ollie Millroy	Succeeded by Nicky Catsburg; Thomas Merrill; Chandler Hull
Preceded by Matt Campbell; Mathieu Jaminet	IMSA SportsCar Championship; GTD Pro Champion; 2023; With: Jack Hawksworth	Succeeded by Laurin Heinrich
Awards and achievements
Preceded by Daniel Cammish	Autosport Awards; British Club Driver of the Year; 2014	Succeeded by Will Palmer
