= 2020 W Series =

Motor racing competition

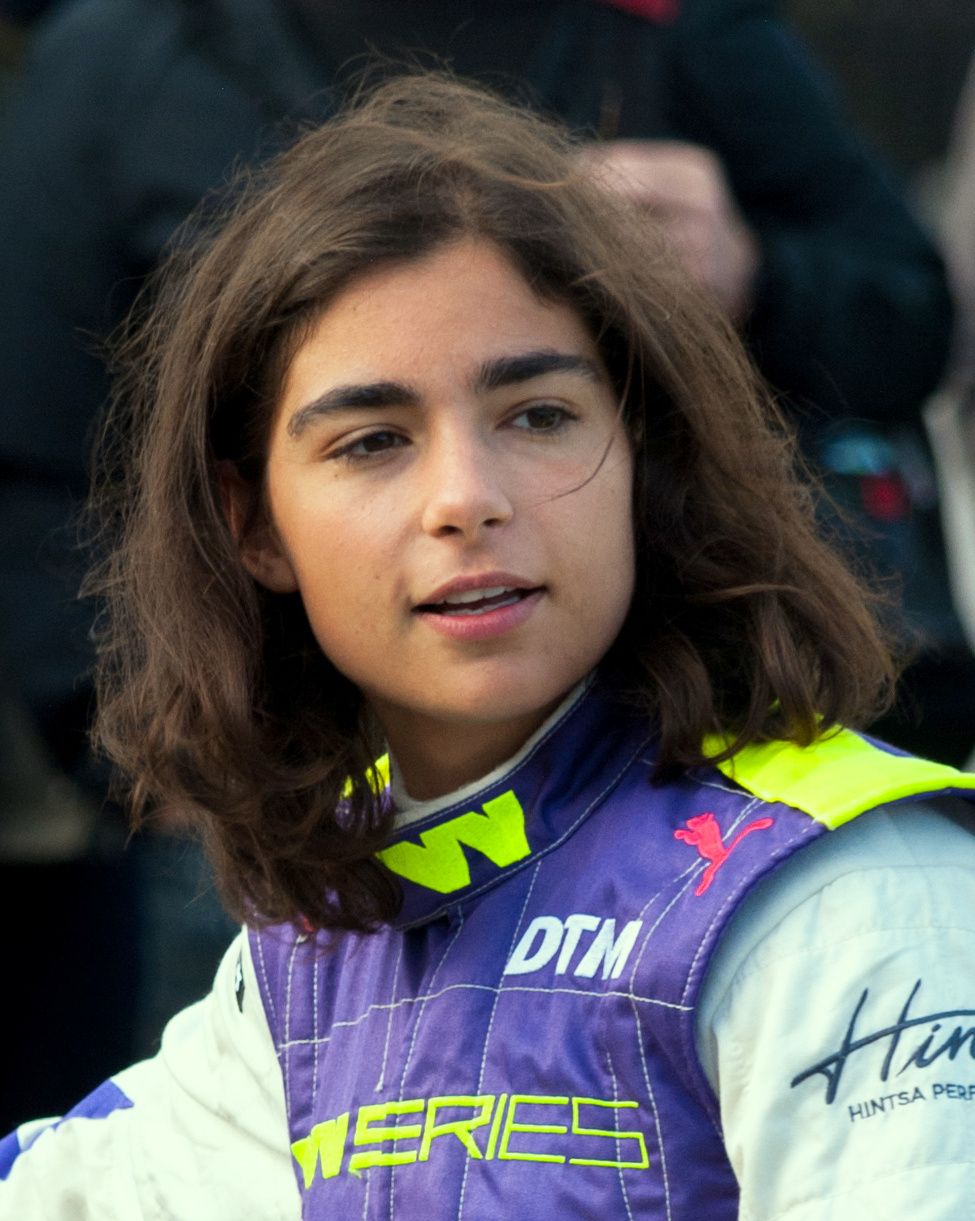
Jamie Chadwick, the reigning drivers' champion from the 2019 season.

The 2020 W Series was a planned motor racing championship that was scheduled to be the second W Series season. The championship was to be exclusively open to female racing drivers as a Formula Regional-level racing series.

The planned championship season was cancelled due to the COVID-19 pandemic, and a 10-event eSports league for female racing drivers only was held on the iRacing platform in its place. The league was ultimately won by Beitske Visser.

== Driver selection ==
The top twelve finishers from the 2019 championship were automatically eligible to compete in the 2020 season, leaving eight vacancies in the driver line up. Forty new drivers applied to take part in the season; however, only fourteen of those took part in the first test which took place between 16 and 18 September 2019 at the Circuito de Almería, Spain.

=== Applications ===
The following eight drivers competed in the 2019 W Series but did not automatically qualify for 2020:

- (Belgium) Sarah Bovy
- (Canada) Megan Gilkes
- (United Kingdom) Esmee Hawkey
- (United States) Shea Holbrook
- (Hungary) Vivien Keszthelyi
- (Poland) Gosia Rdest
- (Rwanda) Naomi Schiff
- (Australia) Caitlin Wood

The following eight drivers attempted to qualify for the 2020 W Series, having not competed in 2019 but were unsuccessful or elected not to race in W Series:

- (United States) Courtney Crone
- (Denmark) Michelle Gatting
- (United States) Hannah Grisham
- (New Zealand) Chelsea Herbert
- (Japan) Anna Inotsume
- (Czech Republic) Gabriela Jílková
- (United Kingdom) Katherine Legge
- (United Kingdom) Abbie Munro

=== Qualified drivers ===
No.	Drivers
5	(Liechtenstein) Fabienne Wohlwend
7	(Finland) Emma Kimiläinen
11	(Italy) Vicky Piria
17	(Norway) Ayla Ågren
19	(Spain) Marta García
21	(United Kingdom) Jessica Hawkins
22	(Spain) Belén García
26	(United Kingdom) Sarah Moore
27	(United Kingdom) Alice Powell
31	(South Africa) Tasmin Pepper
32	(Spain) Nerea Martí
37	(United States) Sabré Cook
44	(United Kingdom) Abbie Eaton
51	(Russia) Irina Sidorkova
55	(United Kingdom) Jamie Chadwick
85	(Japan) Miki Koyama
95	(Netherlands) Beitske Visser
97	(Brazil) Bruna Tomaselli

== Calendar ==
The series was scheduled to continue supporting the 2020 Deutsche Tourenwagen Masters for most races. Races at Hockenheimring, Circuit Zolder and Misano World Circuit were replaced by races at Igora Drive, Anderstorp Raceway and Autodromo Nazionale di Monza. On 16 January 2020, the series announced it would stage races in the Americas, operating as a support category for the United States and Mexico City Grands Prix. On 4 June 2020, the series announced that it would not hold on-track races for the 2020 season, with Formula 1 Managing Director of Motorsports, Ross Brawn, stating "It is a big disappointment for all of us that due to the difficulties presented by COVID-19 the events will not take place."

Round	Circuit	Date	Maps
1	(Russia) Igora Drive	30 May	2020 W Series is located in Europe 2020 W Series is located in North America
2	(Sweden) Anderstorp Raceway	13 June	2020 W Series is located in Europe 2020 W Series is located in North America
3	(Italy) Autodromo Nazionale di Monza	27 June	2020 W Series is located in Europe 2020 W Series is located in North America
4	(Germany) Norisring	11 July	2020 W Series is located in Europe 2020 W Series is located in North America
5	(United Kingdom) Brands Hatch	23 August	2020 W Series is located in Europe 2020 W Series is located in North America
6	(Netherlands) TT Circuit Assen	5 September	2020 W Series is located in Europe 2020 W Series is located in North America
7	(United States) Circuit of the Americas	24 October	2020 W Series is located in Europe 2020 W Series is located in North America
8	(Mexico) Autódromo Hermanos Rodríguez	31 October	2020 W Series is located in Europe 2020 W Series is located in North America

== eSports League ==
The inaugural and ultimately only season of the W Series eSports League virtual championship was announced on 7 May 2020 in response to the cancellation of the normal championship. The league partnered with Logitech G, Beyond Entertainment, and iRacing to contest 10 virtual events with all drivers competing in digital versions of the Tatuus Formula Renault 2.0 race car. Events consisted of three races, three heats of 15mins each with the second being a reverse-grid race, and were broadcast with a week delay on YouTube. All 18 drivers who qualified to race in the on-track championship plus the three reserve drivers partook in the sim racing series, with guest wildcards employed late in the season as some drivers returned to normal racing in other categories. Beitske Visser clinched the championship title with a round to spare, winning 11 races and achieving pole position 12 times.

=== Calendar and results ===
Round	Circuit	Broadcast date	Race winners	Source
1	Autodromo Nazionale di Monza	11 June	R1: (Netherlands) Beitske Visser; R2: (Poland) Gosia Rdest; R3: (Netherlands) Beitske Visser	
2	Circuit of the Americas	18 June	R1: (Netherlands) Beitske Visser; R2: (Finland) Emma Kimiläinen; R3: (Netherlands) Beitske Visser	
3	Brands Hatch	25 June	R1: (Netherlands) Beitske Visser; R2: (Russia) Irina Sidorkova; R3: (Russia) Irina Sidorkova	
4	Autódromo José Carlos Pace	2 July	R1: (Netherlands) Beitske Visser; R2: (Russia) Irina Sidorkova; R3: (Netherlands) Beitske Visser	
5	Circuit de Spa-Francorchamps	9 July	R1: (Spain) Marta García; R2: (South Africa) Tasmin Pepper; R3: (Spain) Marta García	
6	Watkins Glen International	16 July	R1: (Netherlands) Beitske Visser; R2: (Russia) Irina Sidorkova; R3: (Spain) Marta García	
7	Suzuka International Racing Course	23 July	R1: (Spain) Marta García; R2: (Spain) Belén García; R3: (Spain) Marta García	
8	Mount Panorama Circuit	30 July	R1: (Spain) Marta García; R2: (South Africa) Tasmin Pepper; R3: (Netherlands) Beitske Visser	
9	Nürburgring (Nordschleife)	6 August	R1: (Netherlands) Beitske Visser; R2: (Czech Republic) Gabriela Jílková; R3: (Netherlands) Beitske Visser	
10	Silverstone Circuit	13 August	R1: (Spain) Marta García; R2: (United Kingdom) Sarah Moore; R3: (Spain) Marta García	

=== Championship standings ===
Pos.	Driver	Pts
1	(Netherlands) Beitske Visser	439
2	(Spain) Marta García	423
3	(Russia) Irina Sidorkova	331
4	(Spain) Nerea Martí	317
5	(South Africa) Tasmin Pepper	305
6	(Australia) Caitlin Wood	303
7	(Norway) Ayla Ågren	224
8	(Spain) Belén García	212
9	(United Kingdom) Sarah Moore	205
10	(Rwanda) Naomi Schiff	161
11	(Liechtenstein) Fabienne Wohlwend	145
12	(United Kingdom) Alice Powell	137
13	(United Kingdom) Jessica Hawkins	135
14	(United Kingdom) Abbie Eaton	124
15	(Finland) Emma Kimiläinen	101
16	(Poland) Gosia Rdest	100
17	(Brazil) Bruna Tomaselli	86
18	(United States) Sabré Cook	68
19	(Japan) Miki Koyama	53
20	(Italy) Vittoria Piria	39
21	(United Kingdom) Jamie Chadwick	18
Guest drivers
	(Czech Republic) Gabriela Jílková	0
	(United States) Hannah Grisham	0
	(United Kingdom) Charlie Martin	0
