= 2021 Spa-Francorchamps W Series round =

2021 W Series Spa-Francorchamps round
- Event 5 of 7 of the 2021 W Series

Race details
- Date: 28 August 2021
- Official name: 2021 W Series Spa-Francorchamps round
- Location: Circuit de Spa-Francorchamps, Spa, Wallonia, Belgium
- Course: Permanent circuit
- Course length: 7.004 km (4.350 miles)
- Distance: 12 laps, 84.048 km (52.200 miles)

Pole position
Driver	(United Kingdom) Jamie Chadwick	Veloce Racing
- Time: 2:18.074

Fastest lap
Driver	(Finland) Emma Kimiläinen	Écurie W
- Time: 2:43.401

Podium
First	(Finland) Emma Kimiläinen	Écurie W
Second	(United Kingdom) Jamie Chadwick	Veloce Racing
Third	(Spain) Marta García	Puma W Series Team

The 2021 W Series Spa-Francorchamps round was the fifth round of seven in the 2021 W Series, and took place at the Circuit de Spa-Francorchamps in Belgium on 28 August 2021. The event was an undercard to the 2021 Formula One World Championship round at the same circuit.

== Report ==
=== Background ===
Irina Sidorkova returned a positive coronavirus test prior to first practice and was replaced in the W Series Academy team with Gosia Rdest.

Jamie Chadwick led the championship on 73 points, 1 point ahead of Alice Powell.

=== Race ===
A six-car crash involving Sarah Moore, Ayla Ågren, Belén García, Abbie Eaton, Beitske Visser and Fabienne Wohlwend at Radillon de l'Eau Rouge marred the qualifying session held the previous day. Ågren and Visser were taken to hospital for precautionary checks where it was revealed the Dutchwoman had suffered a minor leg injury; both drivers were withdrawn from the race.

The race began under safety car due to inclement conditions, but after 4 laps it pulled in and Chadwick led the field away to green. Caitlin Wood, who had qualified fourth and started third in her second event of the season, cut across the top of Radillon and allowed Emma Kimiläinen to draw close and eventually pass at Bruxelles. Wood's team-mate Marta García capitalised on the Finn's pass and made an initially unsuccessful move herself into Pouhon before sealing fourth around the outside of Campus.

Wohlwend – who had sat on provisional pole prior to the crash in qualifying – initially struggled in the conditions having outbraked herself in a move on Vittoria Piria for 10th at La Source, but recovered quickly and took the place a lap later. This began a charge through the field for the Liechtensteiner, disposing of Bunker team-mate Sabré Cook and Miki Koyama with ease. Kimiläinen and Marta García also had pace to burn, reeling in the leading duo by 2 seconds a lap – the former passing a grip-limited Alice Powell for second before setting off after Chadwick. The weekend was not going to plan for Bruna Tomaselli – the Brazilian was given a two-place grid penalty for missing the paddock entry gate at the end of practice, and was now dropping back behind the hastily repaired cars of Eaton and Moore at a rapid rate.

Having cleared Powell, Kimiläinen was unleashed – with lap times 3 seconds quicker than Chadwick, she stormed around the outside of the Veloce Racing entry at turn 13 with four minutes remaining to take the lead. García meanwhile had struggled to get around Powell initially but undercut the Brit at Stavelot for the final podium place on lap 10. Wohlwend's fightback wasn't finished either, rounding up Nerea Martí on the last lap for seventh in an identical move to Kimiläinen's for the lead.

Kimiläinen took her first win of the season in dominant style, finishing eight and a half seconds ahead of Chadwick. Marta García closed on Chadwick after her move on Powell but ran out of time to improve her position, while Powell lost ground in the title race with her fourth-place finish. Caitlin Wood rounded out a fine weekend in the top five some seventeen seconds behind Powell, with Jessica Hawkins barely hanging on to sixth ahead of Wohlwend. Tomaselli dropped behind Belén García before the flag to finish 15th, with Gosia Rdest the last car across the line nearly 1 minute 15 seconds behind the leaders on a difficult return to the championship.

== Classification ==
=== Practice ===
Session	No.	Driver	Team	Time	Source
Practice 1	55	(United Kingdom) Jamie Chadwick	Veloce Racing	2:31.966	

=== Qualifying ===
Pos.	No.	Driver	Team	Time/Gap
1	55	(United Kingdom) Jamie Chadwick	Veloce Racing	2:18.074
2	27	(United Kingdom) Alice Powell	Racing X	+0.721
3	32	(Spain) Nerea Martí^{1}	W Series Academy	+1.127
4	20	(Australia) Caitlin Wood	Puma W Series Team	+1.163
5	7	(Finland) Emma Kimiläinen	Écurie W	+1.484
6	19	(Spain) Marta García	Puma W Series Team	+1.752
7	21	(United Kingdom) Jessica Hawkins	Racing X	+2.018
8	11	(Italy) Vittoria Piria	Sirin Racing	+2.019
9	54	(Japan) Miki Koyama	Sirin Racing	+2.087
10	97	(Brazil) Bruna Tomaselli^{2}	Veloce Racing	+2.180
11	37	(United States) Sabré Cook	Bunker Racing	+2.566
12	3	(Poland) Gosia Rdest	W Series Academy	+2.742
13	5	(Liechtenstein) Fabienne Wohlwend (Note: Wohlwend races with a Swiss licence however is a Liechtenstein citizen and passport holder.)	Bunker Racing	+5.134
14	17	(Norway) Ayla Ågren	M. Forbes Motorsport	+7.013
15	95	(Netherlands) Beitske Visser	M. Forbes Motorsport	+7.462
16	44	(United Kingdom) Abbie Eaton	Écurie W	+7.528
17	26	(United Kingdom) Sarah Moore	Scuderia W	+8.331
18	22	(Spain) Belén García	Scuderia W	+11.597

- ^1 – Martí received a four-place grid penalty for a cooldown lap procedure infringement at the previous round.
- ^2 – Tomaselli received a two-place grid penalty for failing to follow the race director's instructions at the end of practice.

=== Race ===
Pos.	No.	Driver	Team	Laps	Time/Retired	Grid	Pts
1	7	(Finland) Emma Kimiläinen	Écurie W	12	35:21.478	4	25
2	55	(United Kingdom) Jamie Chadwick	Veloce Racing	12	+8.489	1	18
3	19	(Spain) Marta García	Puma W Series Team	12	+11.949	5	15
4	27	(United Kingdom) Alice Powell	Racing X	12	+18.182	2	12
5	20	(Australia) Caitlin Wood	Puma W Series Team	12	+35.832	3	10
6	21	(United Kingdom) Jessica Hawkins	Racing X	12	+39.596	6	8
7	5	(Liechtenstein) Fabienne Wohlwend	Bunker Racing	12	+40.095	13	6
8	32	(Spain) Nerea Martí	W Series Academy	12	+40.880	7	4
9	54	(Japan) Miki Koyama	Sirin Racing	12	+41.757	9	2
10	44	(United Kingdom) Abbie Eaton	Écurie W	12	+42.989	14	1
11	37	(United States) Sabré Cook	Bunker Racing	12	+43.701	10	
12	11	(Italy) Vittoria Piria	Sirin Racing	12	+46.332	8	
13	26	(United Kingdom) Sarah Moore	Scuderia W	12	+47.178	15	
14	22	(Spain) Belén García	Scuderia W	12	+47.780	16	
15	97	(Brazil) Bruna Tomaselli	Veloce Racing	12	+58.499	12	
16	3	(Poland) Gosia Rdest	W Series Academy	12	+1:13.855	11	
DNS	17	(Norway) Ayla Ågren	M. Forbes Motorsport	0	Qualifying crash		
DNS	95	(Netherlands) Beitske Visser	M. Forbes Motorsport	0	Qualifying crash		
Fastest lap set by Emma Kimiläinen: 2:43.401

== Championship standings ==
Pos.	Driver	Pts	Gap
1	(United Kingdom) Jamie Chadwick	91	
2	(United Kingdom) Alice Powell	84	-7
3	(Finland) Emma Kimiläinen	60	-31
4	(Spain) Nerea Martí	41	-50
5	(Liechtenstein) Fabienne Wohlwend	40	-51

== See also ==
- 2021 Belgian Grand Prix

== Notes ==
Previous race: 2021 W Series Budapest round	W Series; 2021 season	Next race: 2021 W Series Zandvoort round
