= 2021 Austin W Series round =

(United States) 2021 W Series Austin round
Event Information
- Round 7 of 7 in the 2021
- Date: October 23–24 2021
- Location: Austin, Texas, United States
- Venue: Circuit of the Americas

Results
Race 1
Distance	16 laps	88.208 km
Pole position	(United Kingdom) Abbi Pulling; Puma W Series Team	2:05.633
Winner	(United Kingdom) Jamie Chadwick; Veloce Racing	33:59.968
Race 2
Distance	16 laps	88.208 km
Pole position	(United Kingdom) Jamie Chadwick; Veloce Racing	2:05.704
Winner	(United Kingdom) Jamie Chadwick; Veloce Racing	33:48.906

The 2021 W Series Austin round was the seventh and final round of the 2021 W Series, and took place at the Circuit of the Americas in the United States on the October 23 and 24, 2021. The event was an undercard to the 2021 Formula One World Championship round at the same circuit.

== Report ==
=== Background ===
The championship was originally scheduled to hold two events in the Americas, one at the Circuit of the Americas and another at the Autódromo Hermanos Rodríguez in support of the 2021 Mexico City Grand Prix – however due to calendar changes for Formula One, W Series opted to hold just the one event in Austin but add a second race to their support billing. Two practice sessions would be held with only one qualifying session, where a drivers' fastest time set the grid positions for race one and her second fastest time set her grid position for race two.

Prior to the event, it was confirmed that the top eight drivers in the standings at seasons' end would be guaranteed entry into the 2022 season. The championship also announced a series of breast cancer prevention initiatives for the Austin round in response to Breast Cancer Awareness Month.

Russian driver Irina Sidorkova was denied a visa to the United States and was forced to miss the event; she was replaced with Caitlin Wood.

Alice Powell and Jamie Chadwick both led the championship on 109 points, however Powell was mathematically ahead with three wins to Chadwick's two.

=== Race 1 ===
Abbi Pulling scored a shock pole in just her third W Series outing but the young Brit lost out at the start as Emma Kimiläinen rounded up both drivers on the front row and shot to the lead, however a slow exit from the first corner allowed Jamie Chadwick to take the lead ahead of Pulling. Belén García had qualified third but a grid penalty put her back to sixth; the disadvantage was quickly wiped out as she went around the outside of both Kimiläinen and Pulling at turn two, the Finn using García as a slingshot to re-pass Pulling back up into the podium places as the field swept into the esses. Fabienne Wohlwend and Alice Powell both made solid progress on the opening lap as well, each gaining three places up into 6th and 7th respectively.

After Belén García's rapid start, the Spaniard began to form a train of cars behind – Kimiläinen attempted a move into turn 11, forcing the Scuderia W car offline and the Écurie W driver dragged her way past down the back straight. Pulling and Sarah Moore attempted moves behind, however had to settle for a little while longer. Powell, whose disastrous qualifying had placed her firmly on the back foot in the championship fight, made it a four-car battle for the podium as Pulling slid down the inside at the final corner. Powell used the move to pass Moore into turn 1 before taking García at turn 12, however had lost significant ground on her protégé Pulling.

Abbie Eaton started the weekend on the back foot having qualifying 14th for both races, and after falling to 16th at the start her weekend ended prematurely when she fractured her T4 vertebrae in a collision with a sausage kerb on the exit of turn 16. Wohlwend's good start also fell apart as her tyres began to degrade as a result of a spin in Practice 2 – the Liechtensteiner falling back to 10th. Ahead of her, Beitske Visser got past Marta García in a three-car battle for seventh that included Jessica Hawkins.

Belén García's pace had deteriorated exponentially heading into the closing stages as the leaders pulled away from her fifth place at the rate of 2 seconds per lap. Nerea Martí was recovering from the worst qualifying of her rookie season by passing Wohlwend for the final point, while Hawkins passed Marta García ahead for eighth – and signalled her displeasure with the Spaniard's defence as she went past on the back straight. Moore, fed up with her team-mate's lack of pace, sent it down the inside of Belén García at turn 1 with eight minutes to go, Visser following closely behind. Half a lap later García ran wide on the exit of turn 11 under some pressure from Hawkins and lost out to the Brit – however when Marta García tried to make the move at turn 12 she applied too much throttle and spun out on her own, dropping a long way out of the points. Belén García soon suffered a similar fate; Martí, Wohlwend and Koyama all sailing past the Catalan to drop her out of the points.

Having disposed of her team-mate, Sarah Moore now found herself fighting Visser for the top five. A difficult season for the 2019 runner-up had left her with only two points finishes in six races, but the Dutchwoman soared past Moore at turn 12 to equal her best result of the season. At the front, Powell had steadily closed on Pulling in the Puma car – and a track limits warning for Pulling curtailed her pace even further. On the final lap of the race, Powell dived up the inside of Pulling at turn 11 to seal the bottom step of the podium and clawed back another three points in the championship hunt.

Jamie Chadwick took a lights-to-flag victory with Kimiläinen second. Powell's third place left her ten points down on Chadwick, and with the Veloce Racing driver starting 9 places ahead in the final race she had one hand firmly on the championship trophy.

=== Race 2 ===
The grid was reduced to sixteen cars for the last race of the season – Abbie Eaton was hospitalised with a compound fracture and Marta García withdrew citing mental health concerns.

Chadwick rocketed away from pole position and took a comfortable lead into turn 1. Sarah Moore had a terrible start from third and slipped back into the midfield, and the two Bunker Racing cars went side-by-side – Fabienne Wohlwend was forced wide over the sausage kerbs, bouncing across them in a similar fashion to Eaton the day before but was unharmed. Alice Powell passed her team-mate for seventh as she attempted to stay in the championship hunt.

Kimiläinen was no longer in the championship fight and was guaranteed third in the standings, but that didn't stop her from seizing third from Beitske Visser at turn 11. The Dutchwoman was only just hanging onto a top eight place and attempted to re-pass at the end of the straight but the Finn defended stoutly. Visser's team-mate and Texan resident Ayla Ågren made her way past Bruna Tomaselli for twelfth, the Brazilian had a strong start after issues in qualifying saw her start last for both races.

Sabré Cook engaged in a battle with Hawkins over eighth; the only American in the field had failed to score a point in any of the races and was keen to impress on home soil. She passed Hawkins at turn 16 and chased down Powell, who was stuck behind Belén García. Moore attempted a pass on Visser at turn 1; the move was initially countered by the M. Forbes Motorsport driver, however the Brit made the pass stick a lap later. Wohlwend had suffered a cracked suspension wishbone in her first lap off, and having valiantly held onto a place just outside the points for more than half the race the damage proved too much of a problem and she chose to retire the car.

With Chadwick in a comfortable lead, Powell's chances of winning the championship were becoming increasingly difficult – the Brit used the hurry up from Cook to send one down the inside of García at turn 1, but ran wide and was re-passed. Cook was held up by the move and Hawkins, desperate to try and climb into the championship top eight, attempted to capitalise – but she made a half-hearted move on the American at turn 12 that spun both drivers around 180° and out of the points. Powell finally made the move stick on García with just four minutes remaining, forcing the Spaniard out wide and taking sixth.

Powell's efforts were in vain however as Chadwick cruised to her fourth win of the season and sealed the title by 27 points. Abbi Pulling capped off a breakthrough weekend by finishing second and Kimiläinen drove a quiet race to third. Nerea Martí finished the season as the highest placed rookie in fourth despite two eighth-place finishes in the last round; Moore, Wohlwend, Pulling and Visser securing the remaining spots in the top eight. Irina Sidorkova's absence saw her drop outside the cut-off by 4 points, however as an academy driver she was contracted to a second season regardless.

== Classification ==
=== Practice ===
Session	No.	Driver	Team	Time	Source
Practice 1	55	(United Kingdom) Jamie Chadwick	Veloce Racing	2:06.429	
Practice 2	55	(United Kingdom) Jamie Chadwick	Veloce Racing	2:05.673	

=== Qualifying ===
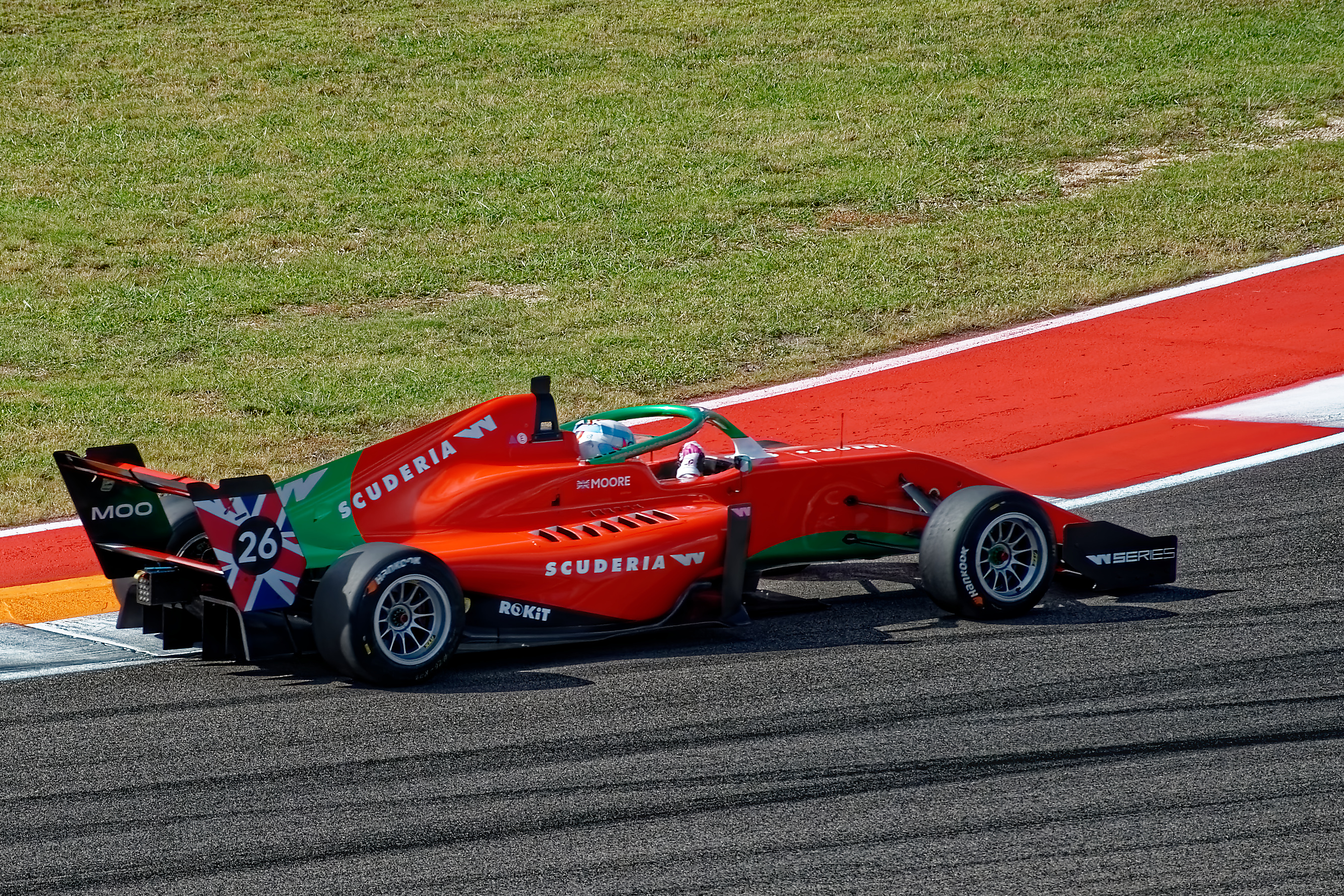
Sarah Moore qualified third for Race 2.

Pos.	No.	Driver	Team	Time/Gap
Fastest times (Race 1)
1	49	(United Kingdom) Abbi Pulling	Puma W Series Team	2:05.633
2	55	(United Kingdom) Jamie Chadwick	Veloce Racing	+0.070
3	22	(Spain) Belén García^{1}	Scuderia W	+0.292
4	26	(United Kingdom) Sarah Moore	Scuderia W	+0.414
5	7	(Finland) Emma Kimiläinen	Écurie W	+0.469
6	19	(Spain) Marta García	Puma W Series Team	+0.523
7	95	(Netherlands) Beitske Visser	M. Forbes Motorsport	+0.549
8	21	(United Kingdom) Jessica Hawkins	Racing X	+0.566
9	5	(Liechtenstein) Fabienne Wohlwend (Note: Wohlwend races with a Swiss licence however is a Liechtenstein citizen and passport holder.)	Bunker Racing	+0.718
10	27	(United Kingdom) Alice Powell	Racing X	+0.816
11	17	(Norway) Ayla Ågren	M. Forbes Motorsport	+0.898
12	37	(United States) Sabré Cook	Bunker Racing	+0.947
13	32	(Spain) Nerea Martí	W Series Academy	+0.982
14	44	(United Kingdom) Abbie Eaton	Écurie W	+1.376
15	54	(Japan) Miki Koyama	Sirin Racing	+1.866
16	20	(Australia) Caitlin Wood	W Series Academy	+2.045
17	11	(Italy) Vittoria Piria	Sirin Racing	+2.139
18	97	(Brazil) Bruna Tomaselli	Veloce Racing	+2.594
Second fastest times (Race 2)
1	55	(United Kingdom) Jamie Chadwick	Veloce Racing	2:05.704
2	49	(United Kingdom) Abbi Pulling	Puma W Series Team	+0.218
3	26	(United Kingdom) Sarah Moore	Scuderia W	+0.389
4	19	(Spain) Marta García	Puma W Series Team	+0.590
5	95	(Netherlands) Beitske Visser	M. Forbes Motorsport	+0.598
6	22	(Spain) Belén García	Scuderia W	+0.661
7	7	(Finland) Emma Kimiläinen	Écurie W	+0.682
8	21	(United Kingdom) Jessica Hawkins	Racing X	+0.726
9	27	(United Kingdom) Alice Powell	Racing X	+0.840
10	5	(Liechtenstein) Fabienne Wohlwend	Bunker Racing	+0.860
11	37	(United States) Sabré Cook	Bunker Racing	+1.184
12	17	(Norway) Ayla Ågren	M. Forbes Motorsport	+1.264
13	32	(Spain) Nerea Martí	W Series Academy	+1.343
14	44	(United Kingdom) Abbie Eaton	Écurie W	+1.681
15	11	(Italy) Vittoria Piria	Sirin Racing	+2.092
16	20	(Australia) Caitlin Wood	W Series Academy	+2.117
17	54	(Japan) Miki Koyama	Sirin Racing	+2.560
18	97	(Brazil) Bruna Tomaselli	Veloce Racing	+2.759

- ^1 – Belén García received a three-place grid penalty for impeding another competitor in qualifying.

=== Race 1 ===
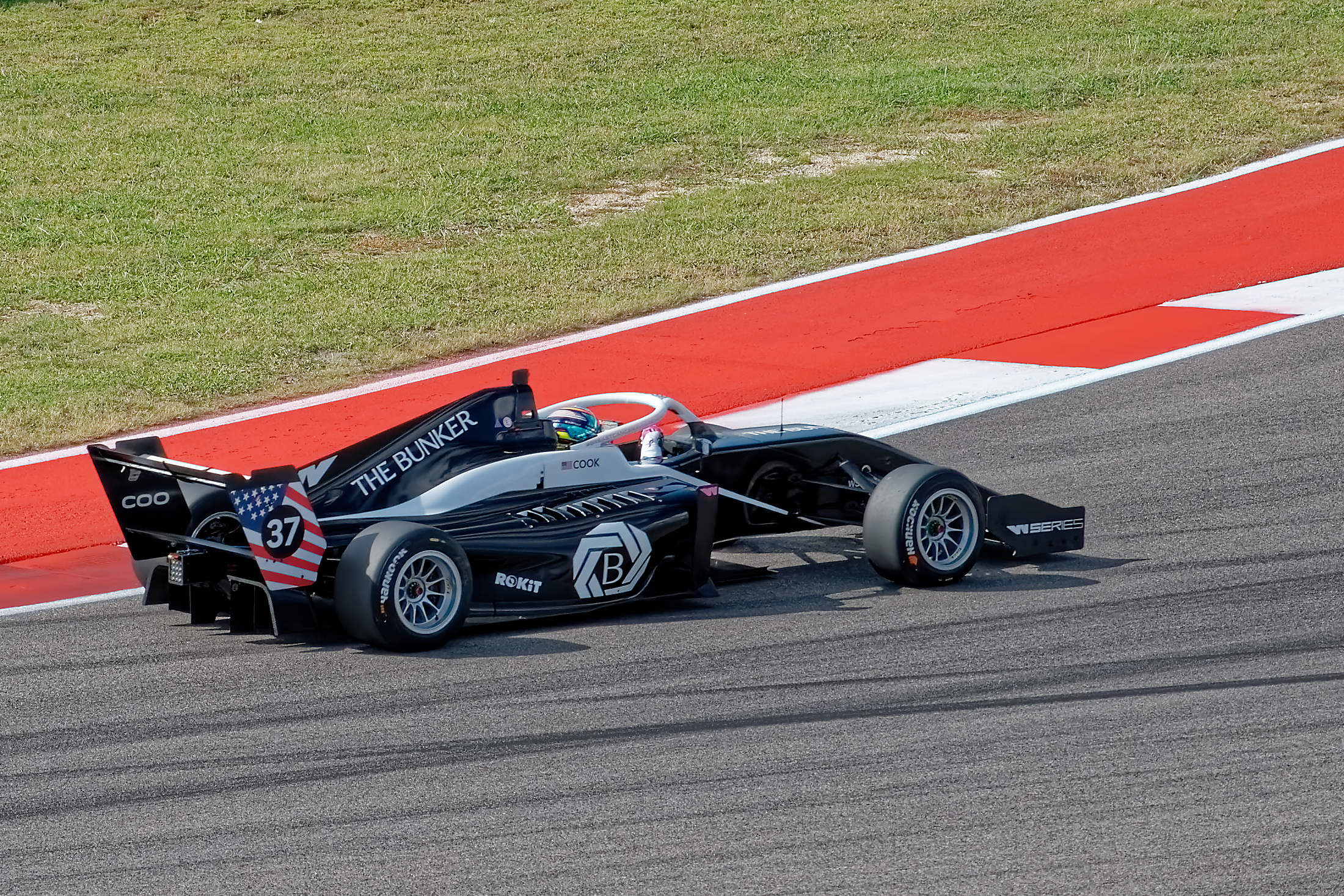
Local driver Sabré Cook finished eleventh, one place outside the points, in Race 1.

Pos.	No.	Driver	Team	Laps	Time/Retired	Grid	Pts
1	55	(United Kingdom) Jamie Chadwick	Veloce Racing	16	33:59.968	2	25
2	7	(Finland) Emma Kimiläinen	Écurie W	16	+1.257	4	18
3	27	(United Kingdom) Alice Powell	Racing X	16	+3.596	10	15
4	49	(United Kingdom) Abbi Pulling	Puma W Series Team	16	+9.292	1	12
5	95	(Netherlands) Beitske Visser	M. Forbes Motorsport	16	+20.296	7	10
6	21	(United Kingdom) Jessica Hawkins	Racing X	16	+21.463	8	8
7	26	(United Kingdom) Sarah Moore	Scuderia W	16	+22.094	3	6
8	32	(Spain) Nerea Martí	W Series Academy	16	+25.379	13	4
9	5	(Liechtenstein) Fabienne Wohlwend	Bunker Racing	16	+29.024	9	2
10	54	(Japan) Miki Koyama	Sirin Racing	16	+30.292	15	1
11	37	(United States) Sabré Cook	Bunker Racing	16	+32.737	12	
12	22	(Spain) Belén García	Scuderia W	16	+35.169	6	
13	20	(Australia) Caitlin Wood	W Series Academy	16	+35.484	16	
14	11	(Italy) Vittoria Piria	Sirin Racing	16	+44.054	17	
15	19	(Spain) Marta García	Puma W Series Team	16	+46.601	5	
16	17	(Norway) Ayla Ågren	M. Forbes Motorsport	16	+49.516	11	
17	97	(Brazil) Bruna Tomaselli	Veloce Racing	16	+49.850	18	
DNF	44	(United Kingdom) Abbie Eaton	Écurie W	4	Injury	14	
Fastest lap set by Alice Powell: 2:06.767

=== Race 2 ===
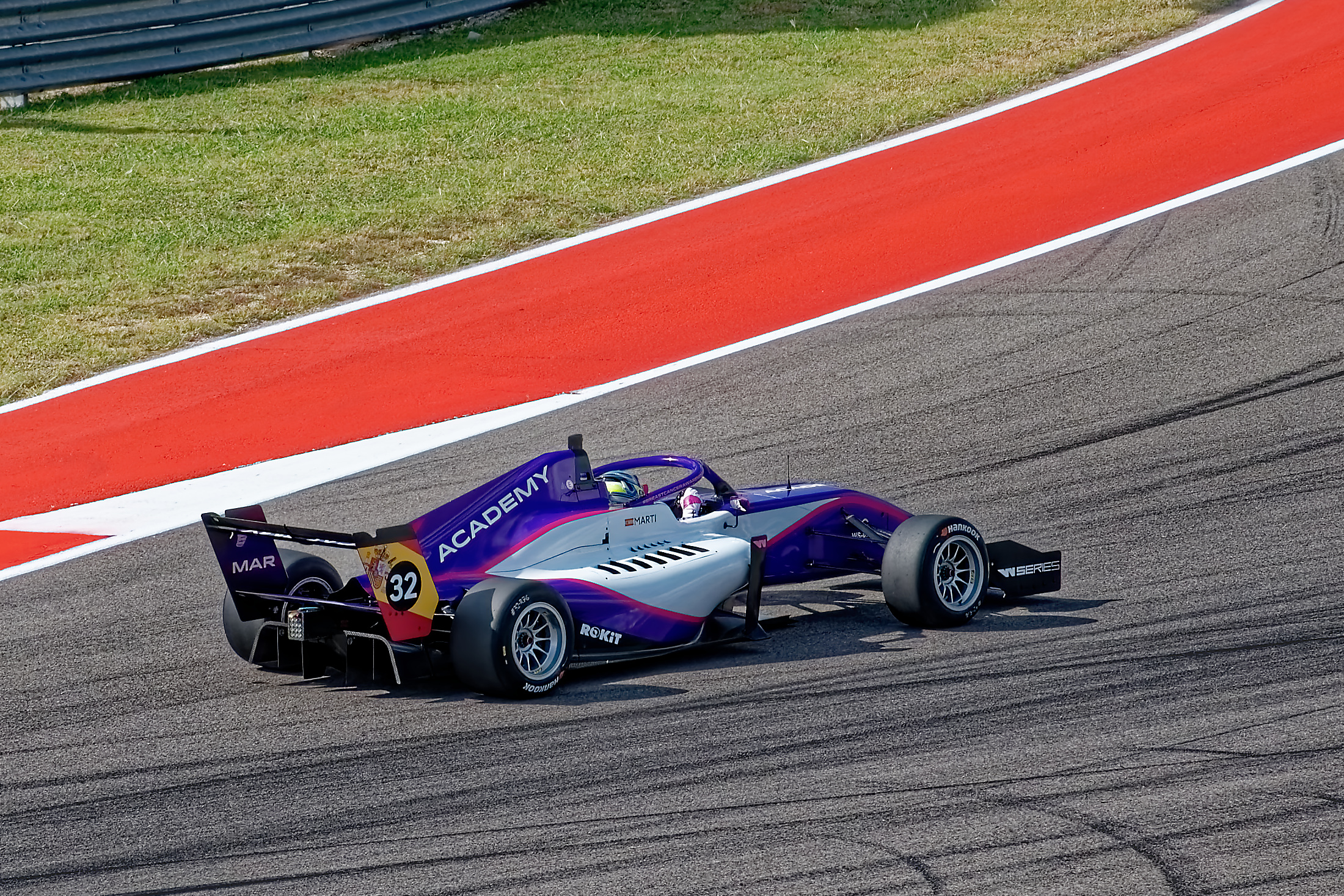
Nerea Martí finished both races in 8th place and secured 4th in the championship, the highest-placed rookie.

Pos.	No.	Driver	Team	Laps	Time/Retired	Grid	Pts
1	55	(United Kingdom) Jamie Chadwick	Veloce Racing	16	33:48.906	1	25
2	49	(United Kingdom) Abbi Pulling	Puma W Series Team	16	+5.030	2	18
3	7	(Finland) Emma Kimiläinen	Écurie W	16	+7.209	6	15
4	26	(United Kingdom) Sarah Moore	Scuderia W	16	+15.857	3	12
5	95	(Netherlands) Beitske Visser	M. Forbes Motorsport	16	+21.061	4	10
6	27	(United Kingdom) Alice Powell	Racing X	16	+24.809	8	8
7	22	(Spain) Belén García	Scuderia W	16	+26.686	5	6
8	32	(Spain) Nerea Martí	W Series Academy	16	+29.507	12	4
9	17	(Norway) Ayla Ågren	M. Forbes Motorsport	16	+29.889	11	2
10	20	(Australia) Caitlin Wood	W Series Academy	16	+36.869	14	1
11	97	(Brazil) Bruna Tomaselli	Veloce Racing	16	+38.249	16	
12	54	(Japan) Miki Koyama	Sirin Racing	16	+42.691	15	
13	37	(United States) Sabré Cook	Bunker Racing	16	+43.723	10	
14	11	(Italy) Vittoria Piria	Sirin Racing	16	+45.309	13	
15	21	(United Kingdom) Jessica Hawkins	Racing X	16	+57.409	7	
DNF	5	(Liechtenstein) Fabienne Wohlwend	Bunker Racing	9	Collision damage	9	
DNS	19	(Spain) Marta García	Puma W Series Team	0	Mental health		
DNS	44	(United Kingdom) Abbie Eaton	Écurie W	0	Injury		
Fastest lap set by Jamie Chadwick: 2:06.464

== Championship standings ==
Pos.	Driver	Pts	Gap
1	(United Kingdom) Jamie Chadwick	159	
2	(United Kingdom) Alice Powell	132	-27
3	(Finland) Emma Kimiläinen	108	-51
4	(Spain) Nerea Martí	61	-98
5	(United Kingdom) Sarah Moore	56	-103

== See also ==
- 2021 United States Grand Prix

== Notes ==
Previous race: 2021 W Series Zandvoort round	W Series; 2021 season	Next race: 2022 W Series Miami round
