= 2021 Zandvoort W Series round =

2021 W Series Zandvoort round
- Event 6 of 7 of the 2021 W Series

Race details
- Date: 4 September 2021
- Official name: 2021 W Series Zandvoort round
- Location: Circuit Zandvoort, Zandvoort, North Holland, the Netherlands
- Course: Permanent circuit
- Course length: 4.259 km (2.646 miles)
- Distance: 20 laps, 85.180 km (52.907 miles)

Pole position
Driver	(Finland) Emma Kimiläinen	Écurie W
- Time: 1:34.326

Fastest lap
Driver	(United Kingdom) Alice Powell	Racing X
- Time: 1:34.719

Podium
First	(United Kingdom) Alice Powell	Racing X
Second	(United Kingdom) Jamie Chadwick	Veloce Racing
Third	(Finland) Emma Kimiläinen	Écurie W

The 2021 W Series Zandvoort round was the sixth and penultimate round of the 2021 W Series, and took place at Circuit Zandvoort in the Netherlands on 4 September 2021. The event was an undercard to the 2021 Formula One World Championship round at the same circuit.

== Report ==
=== Background ===
Irina Sidorkova's COVID-19 testing result at the previous round turned out to be a false positive, and the Russian was let back into the field in time for Zandvoort. Abbi Pulling replaced Caitlin Wood at the Puma W Series Team.

Jamie Chadwick led the championship on 91 points, 7 points ahead of Alice Powell.

=== Race ===
There was drama before the start as Bruna Tomaselli spun at Tarzan on the warm-up lap. Because she fell behind Fabienne Wohlwend, who was due to start last following a crash in qualifying, the Brazilian was sent to the back of the grid.

The start of the race was fairly tame, with the only movement towards the front coming from Jessica Hawkins and Abbie Eaton; the pair passing the slow-starting Abbi Pulling through the opening sequence of corners. Pulling also fell victim to Belén García at Tarzan on lap 2, falling from fifth to eighth – however the other García was overambitious heading into the Hugenholzbocht on Vittoria Piria, attempting to cut under the Italian and nearly losing her wing in the process.

Having initially pulled away from Powell and Chadwick on the opening lap, polesitter and Spa winner Emma Kimiläinen was slowly reeled in by the pair of Brits – and Powell made an unconventional yet successful move for the lead at turn 10, with Chadwick following her compatriot through for second half a lap later at Tarzan. Hawkins however had failed to keep in contact with Nerea Martí ahead and began to form a train behind.

The Tatuus–Alfa Romeo F3 T-318 chassis used in the W Series had gained notoriety amongst the other championships it was deployed in for being difficult to race closely, and the nature of the Zandvoort circuit meant that overtaking proved extraordinarily difficult unless drivers made unforced errors. Marta García proved this point by running wide at the Kumhobocht and the Spaniard dropped to the back of the field almost immediately, after which she failed to make up any ground on the field and remained stubbornly stuck behind Tomaselli in 17th.

Alice Powell claimed her third win of the season ahead of Jamie Chadwick in second – the result placing the two drivers level on 109 points at the top of the standings. Kimiläinen was the only other driver still in championship contention with two races left; she had fallen back into the clutches of Martí but the Academy driver did not manage to take third away from the Finn. The only other movement in the field towards the end of the race was a last lap pass from Pulling on Belén García; the Spaniard locking up and running slightly wide of the high line at the Hugenholzbocht which allowed Pulling to pull past on the run up to Scheivlak.

== Classification ==
=== Practice ===
Session	No.	Driver	Team	Time	Source
Practice 1	55	(United Kingdom) Jamie Chadwick	Veloce Racing	1:35.004	

=== Qualifying ===
Pos.	No.	Driver	Team	Time/Gap
1	7	(Finland) Emma Kimiläinen	Écurie W	1:34.326
2	27	(United Kingdom) Alice Powell	Racing X	+0.074
3	55	(United Kingdom) Jamie Chadwick	Veloce Racing	+0.257
4	32	(Spain) Nerea Martí	W Series Academy	+0.732
5	49	(United Kingdom) Abbi Pulling	Puma W Series Team	+0.852
6	21	(United Kingdom) Jessica Hawkins	Racing X	+0.869
7	44	(United Kingdom) Abbie Eaton	Écurie W	+0.996
8	26	(United Kingdom) Sarah Moore	Scuderia W	+1.212
9	22	(Spain) Belén García	Scuderia W	+1.225
10	54	(Japan) Miki Koyama	Sirin Racing	+1.246
11	11	(Italy) Vittoria Piria	Sirin Racing	+1.276
12	95	(Netherlands) Beitske Visser	M. Forbes Motorsport	+1.324
13	19	(Spain) Marta García	Puma W Series Team	+1.461
14	97	(Brazil) Bruna Tomaselli	Veloce Racing	+1.555
15	51	(Russia) Irina Sidorkova	W Series Academy	+1.829
16	17	(Norway) Ayla Ågren	M. Forbes Motorsport	+2.316
17	37	(United States) Sabré Cook	Bunker Racing	+2.655
18	5	(Liechtenstein) Fabienne Wohlwend (Note: Wohlwend races with a Swiss licence however is a Liechtenstein citizen and passport holder.)	Bunker Racing	+3.310

=== Race ===
Pos.	No.	Driver	Team	Laps	Time/Retired	Grid	Pts
1	27	(United Kingdom) Alice Powell	Racing X	20	31:53.483	2	25
2	55	(United Kingdom) Jamie Chadwick	Veloce Racing	20	+2.871	3	18
3	7	(Finland) Emma Kimiläinen	Écurie W	20	+9.913	1	15
4	32	(Spain) Nerea Martí	W Series Academy	20	+12.157	4	12
5	21	(United Kingdom) Jessica Hawkins	Racing X	20	+13.944	6	10
6	44	(United Kingdom) Abbie Eaton	Écurie W	20	+14.996	7	8
7	49	(United Kingdom) Abbi Pulling	Puma W Series Team	20	+15.889	5	6
8	22	(Spain) Belén García	Scuderia W	20	+16.637	9	4
9	26	(United Kingdom) Sarah Moore	Scuderia W	20	+17.357	8	2
10	54	(Japan) Miki Koyama	Sirin Racing	20	+20.943	10	1
11	11	(Italy) Vittoria Piria	Sirin Racing	20	+21.937	11	
12	95	(Netherlands) Beitske Visser	M. Forbes Motorsport	20	+22.126	12	
13	51	(Russia) Irina Sidorkova	W Series Academy	20	+22.714	15	
14	37	(United States) Sabré Cook	Bunker Racing	20	+31.479	17	
15	17	(Norway) Ayla Ågren	M. Forbes Motorsport	20	+31.664	16	
16	5	(Liechtenstein) Fabienne Wohlwend	Bunker Racing	20	+41.428	18	
17	97	(Brazil) Bruna Tomaselli	Veloce Racing	20	+48.240	14	
18	19	(Spain) Marta García	Puma W Series Team	20	+49.462	13	
Fastest lap set by Alice Powell: 1:34.719

== Championship standings ==
Pos.	Driver	Pts	Gap
1	(United Kingdom) **Alice Powell**	109	
1	(United Kingdom) **Jamie Chadwick**	109	
3	(Finland) **Emma Kimiläinen**	75	-34
4	(Spain) Nerea Martí	53	-56
5	(Liechtenstein) Fabienne Wohlwend	40	-69

- Drivers in **bold** had a mathematical possibility of winning the title.

== See also ==
- 2021 Dutch Grand Prix

== Notes ==
Previous race: 2021 W Series Spa-Francorchamps round	W Series; 2021 season	Next race: 2021 W Series Austin round
