= Belén García =

Spanish racing driver and pole vaulter

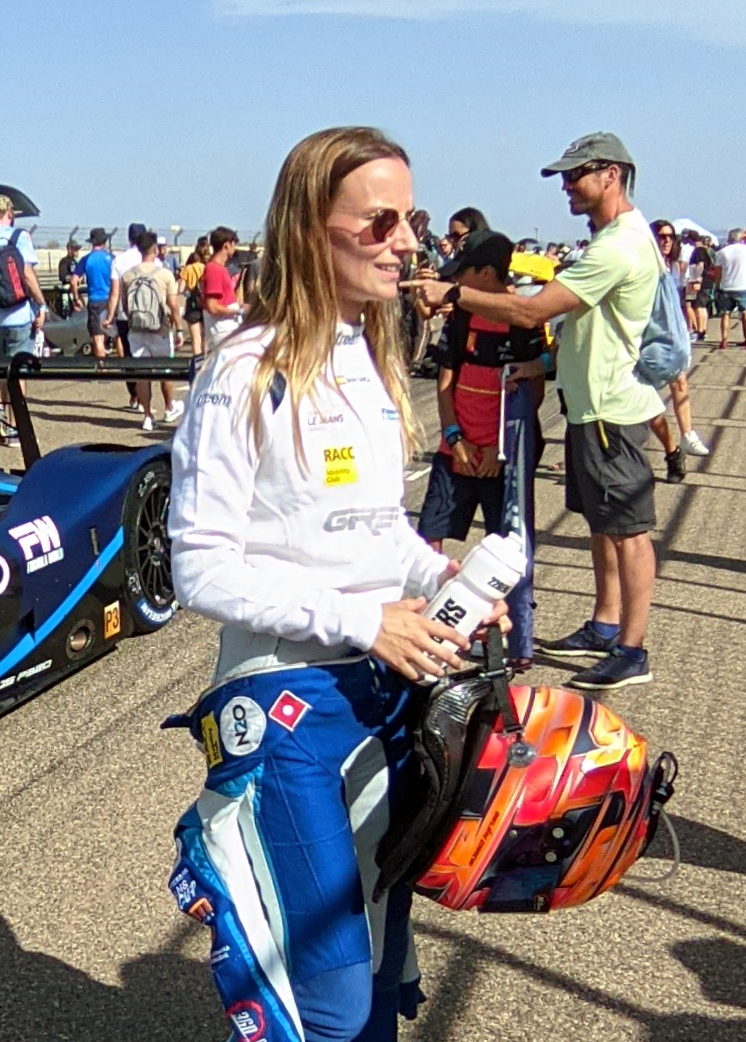
- García in 2023
- Nationality: (Spain) Spanish
- Born: Belén García Espinar; 26 July 1999 (age 27) L'Ametlla del Vallès, Spain

Formula Regional European Championship career
- Debut season: 2021
- Current team: G4 Racing
- Categorisation: FIA Silver
- Car number: 72
- Starts: 8 (8 entries)
- Wins: 0
- Podiums: 0
- Poles: 0
- Fastest laps: 0
- Best finish: 39th in 2021

Previous series
- 2021–2022 2019: W Series; F4 Spanish Championship

Championship titles
- 2019: F4 Spain - Female Trophy

Belén García Espinar (born 26 July 1999) is a Spanish racing driver and pole vaulter. She is a Spanish F4 and LMP3 race winner, and came fifth in the W Series in 2022. She last competed in the European Le Mans Series for DKR Engineering.

== Biography ==
García was born and raised in L'Ametlla del Vallès, a small village near the city of Barcelona. Her parents José Luis and Pilar run motorsport timing company Al Kamel Systems, her father also being a professional rally driver.

In conjunction with her racing, García is also a competitively-registered pole vaulter with Club Atlètic Granollers. García placed 5th at the Catalan U20 Athletics Championships in 2018 with a jump of 3.15 metres.

== Career ==
=== Karting ===
García began karting in 2015 in the Spanish Karting Championship, where she finished 10th in 2018 in the Senior-KZ2 class.

=== Lower formulae ===
García made her professional single-seater debut a year later, competing in the 2019 F4 Spanish Championship for Global Racing Service. She became the first woman to win a Formula 4 race in Europe at just her second attempt at the Circuito de Navarra, but only managed a best result of seventh after that. She eventually finished the season 15th overall, beating Nerea Martí to the female trophy on countback. She also received a call-up to race for Team Spain at the 2019 FIA Motorsport Games, as their representative in the Formula 4 Cup, where she finished sixth, from 12th on the grid.

=== W Series ===
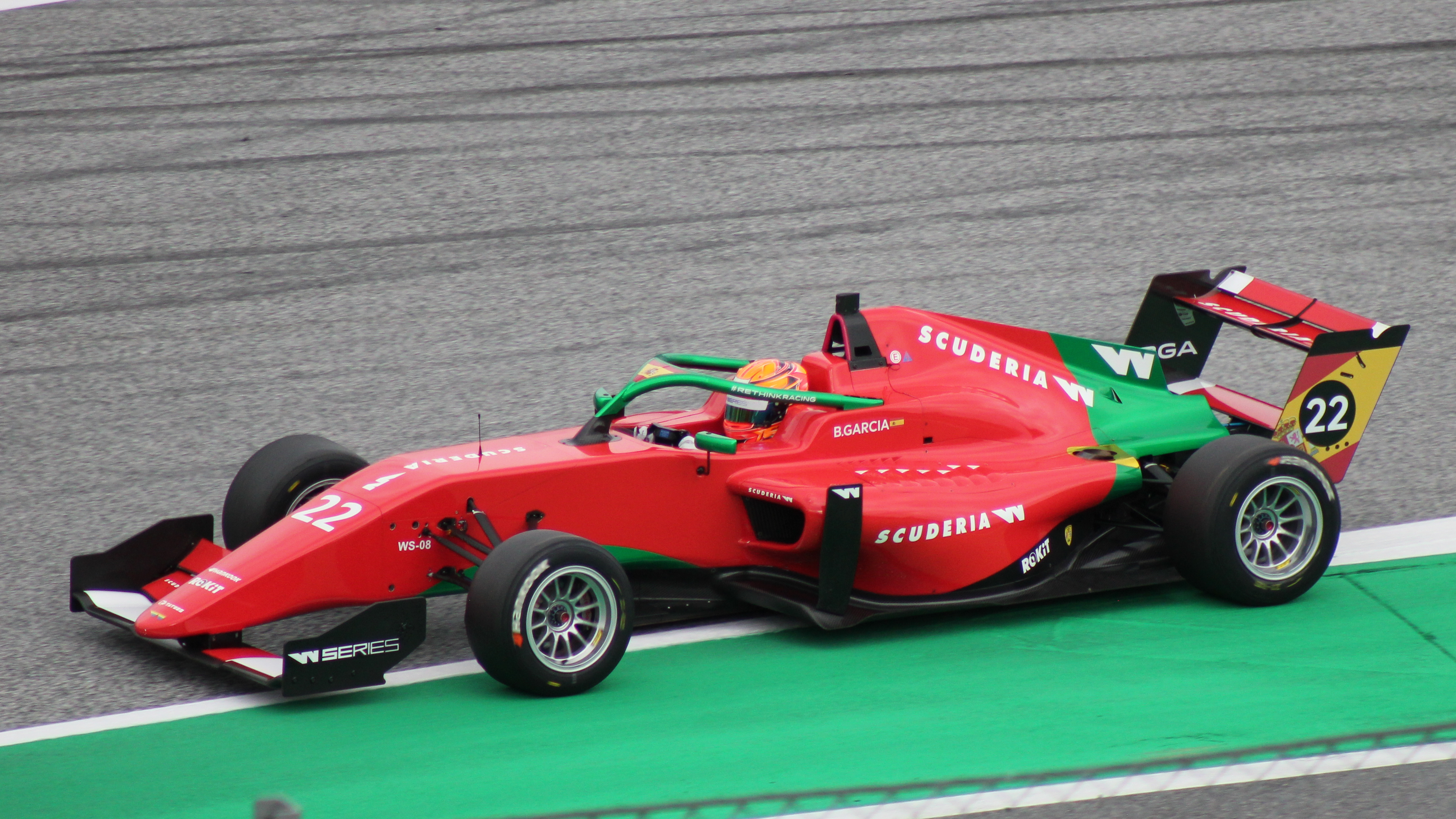
García at the Red Bull Ring in 2021

García qualified for the W Series, a Formula 3 championship for women, in 2020. She was set to twin this with participation in selected rounds of another Formula 3 championship, the Formula Renault Eurocup. However, following the cancellation of the 2020 W Series and the withdrawal of Global Racing Service from the 2020 Formula Renault Eurocup due to the COVID-19 pandemic, she was left without a drive for the season. She then opted for a temporary return to karting, finishing seventh overall in the KZ category of the Spanish Karting Championship, ahead of former Formula 1 driver Roberto Merhi. García also raced in the final round of the Spanish Endurance Championship at Ciudad del Motor de Aragón, driving for NM Racing Team along with her father, in a Ginetta G55 GT4. They finished sixth in race 1 and tenth in race 2 overall but were ineligible for championship points.

In 2021, García made her debut in the W Series, while also racing part-time in the Formula Regional European Championship with G4 Racing as preparation. She starred in the W Series season-opening round at the Red Bull Ring, where she qualified third, dropped to ninth after running wide at turn 6, and then climbed back up to finish the race 4th. However, she was unable to replicate such performance in the remainder of the year, eventually finishing tenth in the standings with 28 points.

García continued racing in the W Series for 2022. Paired with fellow Spanish driver Nerea Martí at the Quantfury team, García proved a much more consistent force, as she scored points in six of the seven rounds that took place before the season was called off in October due to financial issues. She secured her first series podium at Le Castellet in July with second place, and finished the season fifth in the standings, ahead of Martí.

=== Endurance racing ===
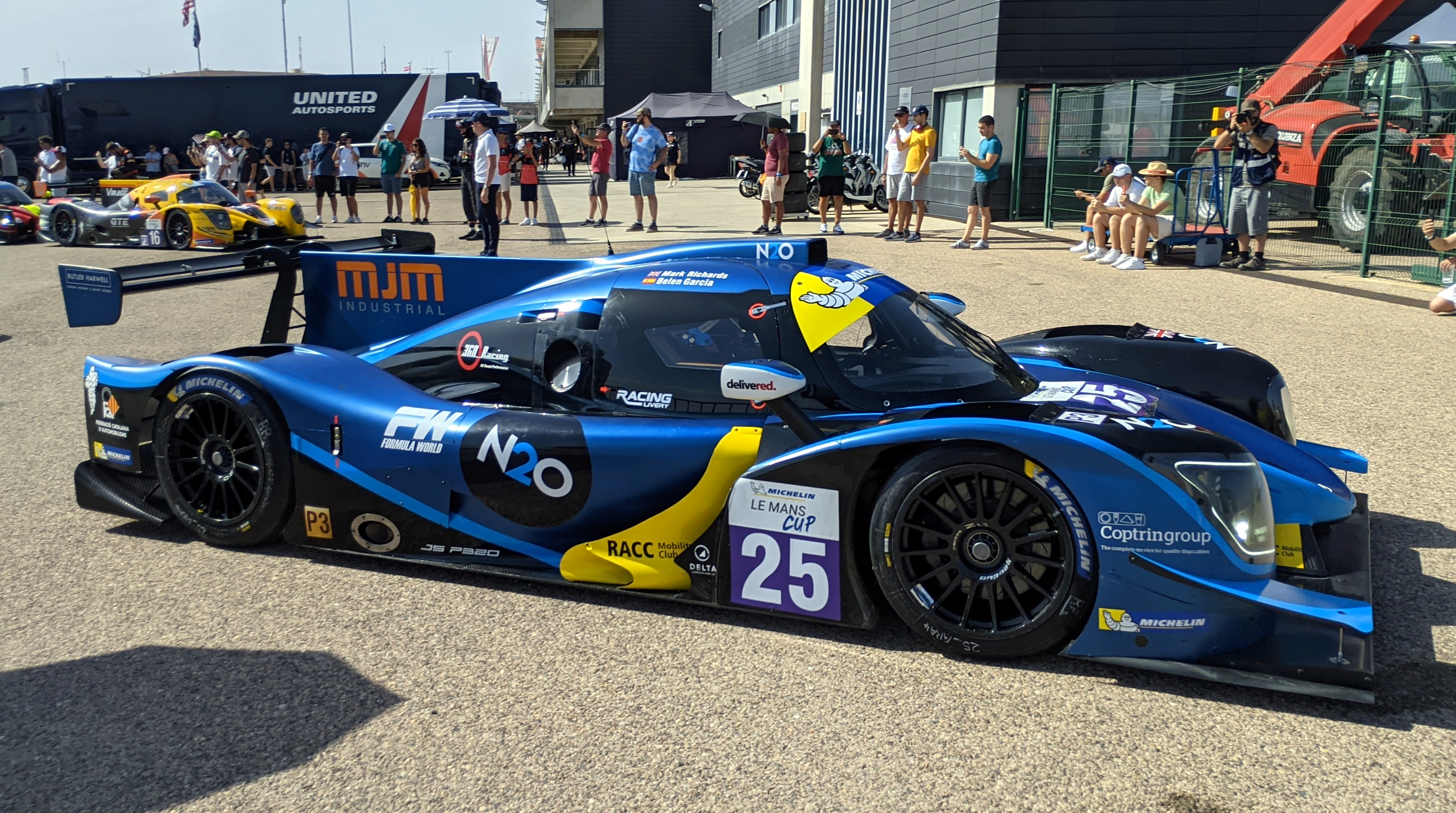
García's LMP3 car at MotorLand Aragón in 2023

After the cancellation of the remaining 2022 W Series rounds, García switched to endurance racing. She made her LMP3 debut at the Le Mans Cup season finale at Portimão in October, racing for CD Sport alongside Chinese gentleman driver Huilin Han. A lengthy red flag period meant she effectively had little more than 20 minutes of driving in the race, where they finished 17th, but she later described the experience as "a lot of fun" and said she was "looking forward to driving a car like that again". She had her second LMP3 experience four weeks later, racing for Graff in the Ultimate Cup Series season-ending four-hour race at Paul Ricard. García proved to be quick from the start, as she led the first practice session by more than a second over newly crowned champion Lucca Allen. Issues in qualifying meant she —along with bronze-rated teammates Eric Trouillet and Sébastien Page— had to start from tenth place, but by the end of the first hour they were already in the lead, and the trio ended up taking the win with a healthy 76-second margin. García set the second fastest lap of the race, a mere tenth of a second slower than LMP3 veteran Matt Bell.

García remained with Trouillet and Page for her first full-time campaign in endurance racing, coming 14th in the 2023 Asian Le Mans Series in one of Graff's Ligier JS P320 LMP3 cars. She also continued in the 2023 Le Mans Cup, partnering amateur driver Mark Richards at 360 Racing. After a hesitant start, the pair managed three top-5 finishes from the last three rounds. She also made a one-off Prototype Cup Germany appearance at the Norisring for Van Ommen Racing by DataLab. Racing with her boyfriend Xavier Lloveras, she finished second in race one and came within 0.001 of the overall fastest lap. García ended the year on another high, topping the timesheets in the ELMS rookie test at Portimão with DKR Engineering.

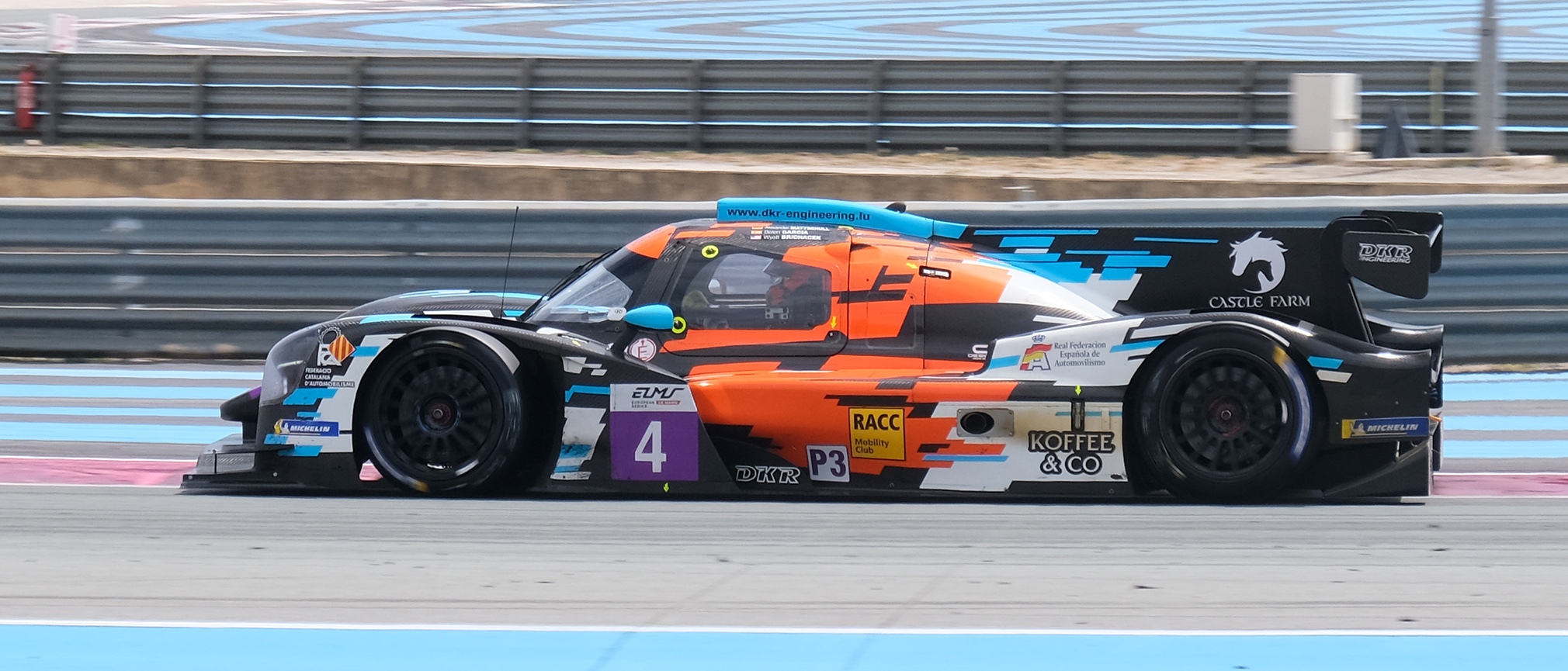
García secured her first ELMS podium at Paul Ricard in 2024

García formally stepped up to the European Le Mans Series in 2024, joining forces with Wyatt Brichacek and Alexander Mattschull at DKR. She achieved her maiden series podium in only her second outing at the 4 Hours of Le Castellet, but persistent issues with her driving position in the Duqueine D08 led her to abruptly split with DKR on the eve of the Spa-Francorchamps race.

Having initially evaluated a gap year for 2025, García accepted a late offer from ANS Motorsport to contest the NP02-spec European Endurance Prototype Cup.

== Karting record ==
=== Karting career summary ===
| Season | Series | Team | Position |
|---|---|---|---|
| 2015 | Spanish Karting Championship — Senior | NM CA Performance | ? |
| 2016 | Spanish Karting Championship — Senior | NM CA Performance | ? |
| 2017 | Spanish Karting Championship — Senior | NM Racing Team | 16th |
| 2018 | Spanish Karting Championship — Senior-KZ2 | NM Racing Team | 10th |
| 2020 | Spanish Karting Championship — KZ | Belén García Espinar | 7th |
| 2020 | FIA Karting World Championship — KZ2 | CRG Srl | 91st |

== Racing record ==
=== Racing career summary ===
| Season | Series | Team | Races | Wins | Poles | F/Laps | Podiums | Points | Position |
|---|---|---|---|---|---|---|---|---|---|
| 2019 | F4 Spanish Championship | Global Racing Service | 21 | 1 | 0 | 0 | 1 | 35 | 15th |
| 2019 | FIA Motorsport Games Formula 4 Cup | Team Spain | 1 | 0 | 0 | 0 | 0 | N/A | 6th |
| 2020 | Campeonato de España de Resistencia - GT | NM Racing Team | 2 | 0 | 0 | 0 | 0 | 0 | NC† |
| 2021 | W Series | Scuderia W | 8 | 0 | 0 | 0 | 0 | 28 | 10th |
| 2021 | Formula Regional European Championship | G4 Racing | 8 | 0 | 0 | 0 | 0 | 0 | 39th |
| 2022 | W Series | Quantfury W Series Team | 7 | 0 | 0 | 0 | 1 | 58 | 5th |
| 2022 | Le Mans Cup - LMP3 | CD Sport | 1 | 0 | 0 | 0 | 0 | 0 | 49th |
| 2022 | Ultimate Cup Series - Proto P3 | Graff | 1 | 1 | 0 | 0 | 1 | 50 | 5th |
| 2023 | Asian Le Mans Series - LMP3 | Graff | 4 | 0 | 0 | 0 | 0 | 14 | 11th |
| 2023 | Le Mans Cup - LMP3 | 360 Racing | 6 | 0 | 0 | 0 | 0 | 30 | 10th |
| 2023 | Prototype Cup Germany | Van Ommen Racing by DataLab | 2 | 0 | 0 | 0 | 1 | 26 | 20th |
| 2024 | European Le Mans Series - LMP3 | DKR Engineering | 3 | 0 | 1 | 0 | 1 | 19 | 14th |
| 2025 | European Endurance Prototype Cup - NP02 | ANS Motorsport | 6 | 0 | 0 | 0 | 3 | 67.5 | 4th |

^{†} As García was a guest driver, she was ineligible to score points.

=== Complete F4 Spanish Championship results ===
(key) (Races in bold indicate pole position) (Races in italics indicate fastest lap)

| Year | Team | 1 | 2 | 3 | 4 | 5 | 6 | 7 | 8 | 9 | 10 | 11 | 12 | 13 | 14 | 15 | 16 | 17 | 18 | 19 | 20 | 21 | DC | Points |
|---|---|---|---|---|---|---|---|---|---|---|---|---|---|---|---|---|---|---|---|---|---|---|---|---|
| 2019 | Global Racing Service | NAV; 1; 15 | NAV; 2; 1 | NAV; 3; 7 | LEC; 1; 10 | LEC; 2; 15 | LEC; 3; 13 | ARA; 1; 15 | ARA; 2; 13 | ARA; 3; 10 | CRT; 1; 14 | CRT; 2; 11 | CRT; 3; 10 | JER; 1; 8 | JER; 2; 12 | JER; 3; 10 | ALG; 1; 7 | ALG; 2; 13 | ALG; 3; 8 | CAT; 1; 18 | CAT; 2; 12 | CAT; 3; 14 | 15th | 35 |

=== Complete FIA Motorsport Games results ===
| Year | Entrant | Cup | Qualifying | Quali Race | Main race |
|---|---|---|---|---|---|
| 2019 | Team Spain | **Formula 4** | 12th | 12th | 6th |

=== Complete Formula Regional European Championship results ===
(key) (Races in bold indicate pole position) (Races in italics indicate fastest lap)

| Year | Team | 1 | 2 | 3 | 4 | 5 | 6 | 7 | 8 | 9 | 10 | 11 | 12 | 13 | 14 | 15 | 16 | 17 | 18 | 19 | 20 | DC | Points |
|---|---|---|---|---|---|---|---|---|---|---|---|---|---|---|---|---|---|---|---|---|---|---|---|
| 2021 | G4 Racing | IMO; 1; 23 | IMO; 2; 22 | CAT; 1; 27 | CAT; 2; 29 | MCO; 1 | MCO; 2 | LEC; 1; 30 | LEC; 2; 24 | ZAN; 1 | ZAN; 2 | SPA; 1 | SPA; 2 | RBR; 1 | RBR; 2 | VAL; 1; 29 | VAL; 2; 27 | MUG; 1 | MUG; 2 | MNZ; 1 | MNZ; 2 | 39th | 0 |

=== Complete W Series results ===
(key) (Races in bold indicate pole position) (Races in italics indicate fastest lap)

| Year | Team | 1 | 2 | 3 | 4 | 5 | 6 | 7 | 8 | DC | Points |
|---|---|---|---|---|---|---|---|---|---|---|---|
| 2021 | Scuderia W | RBR1; 4 | RBR2; 9 | SIL; 17† | HUN; 8 | SPA; 14 | ZAN; 8 | COA1; 12 | COA2; 7 | 10th | 28 |
| 2022 | Quantfury W Series Team | MIA1; 7 | MIA2; 4 | CAT; 7 | SIL; 8 | LEC; 2 | HUN; 13 | SIN; 4 | | 5th | 58 |

^{†} Driver did not finish the race, but was classified as they completed more than 90% of the race distance.

=== Complete Le Mans Cup results ===
(key) (Races in bold indicate pole position; results in italics indicate fastest lap)

| Year | Entrant | Class | Chassis | 1 | 2 | 3 | 4 | 5 | 6 | 7 | Rank | Points |
|---|---|---|---|---|---|---|---|---|---|---|---|---|
| 2022 | CD Sport | LMP3 | Ligier JS P320 | LEC | IMO | LMS; 1 | LMS; 2 | MNZ | SPA | ALG; 17 | 49th | 0 |
| 2023 | 360 Racing | LMP3 | Ligier JS P320 | CAT; 15 | LMS; 1; 17 | LMS; 2; 13 | LEC; 13 | ARA; 5 | SPA; 5 | ALG; 5 | 10th | 30 |

=== Complete Asian Le Mans Series results ===
(key) (Races in bold indicate pole position) (Races in italics indicate fastest lap)

| Year | Team | Class | Car | 1 | 2 | 3 | 4 | Pos. | Points |
|---|---|---|---|---|---|---|---|---|---|
| 2023 | Graff Racing | LMP3 | Ligier JS P320 | DUB; 1; 8 | DUB; 2; 8 | ABU; 1; 7 | ABU; 2 Ret | 14th | 11 |

=== Complete European Le Mans Series results ===
(key) (Races in bold indicate pole position; results in italics indicate fastest lap)

| Year | Entrant | Class | Chassis | Engine | 1 | 2 | 3 | 4 | 5 | 6 | Rank | Points |
|---|---|---|---|---|---|---|---|---|---|---|---|---|
| 2024 | DKR Engineering | LMP3 | Duqueine M30 - D08 | Nissan VK56DE 5.6L V8 | BCN; 5 | LEC; 2^{1} | **IMO**; 6 | SPA; WD | MUG | ALG | 14th | 19 |

- **^1** – Ineligible for points having failed to meet minimum drive time.

^{*} Season still in progress.
