= Jessica Hawkins =

British racing driver (born 1995)

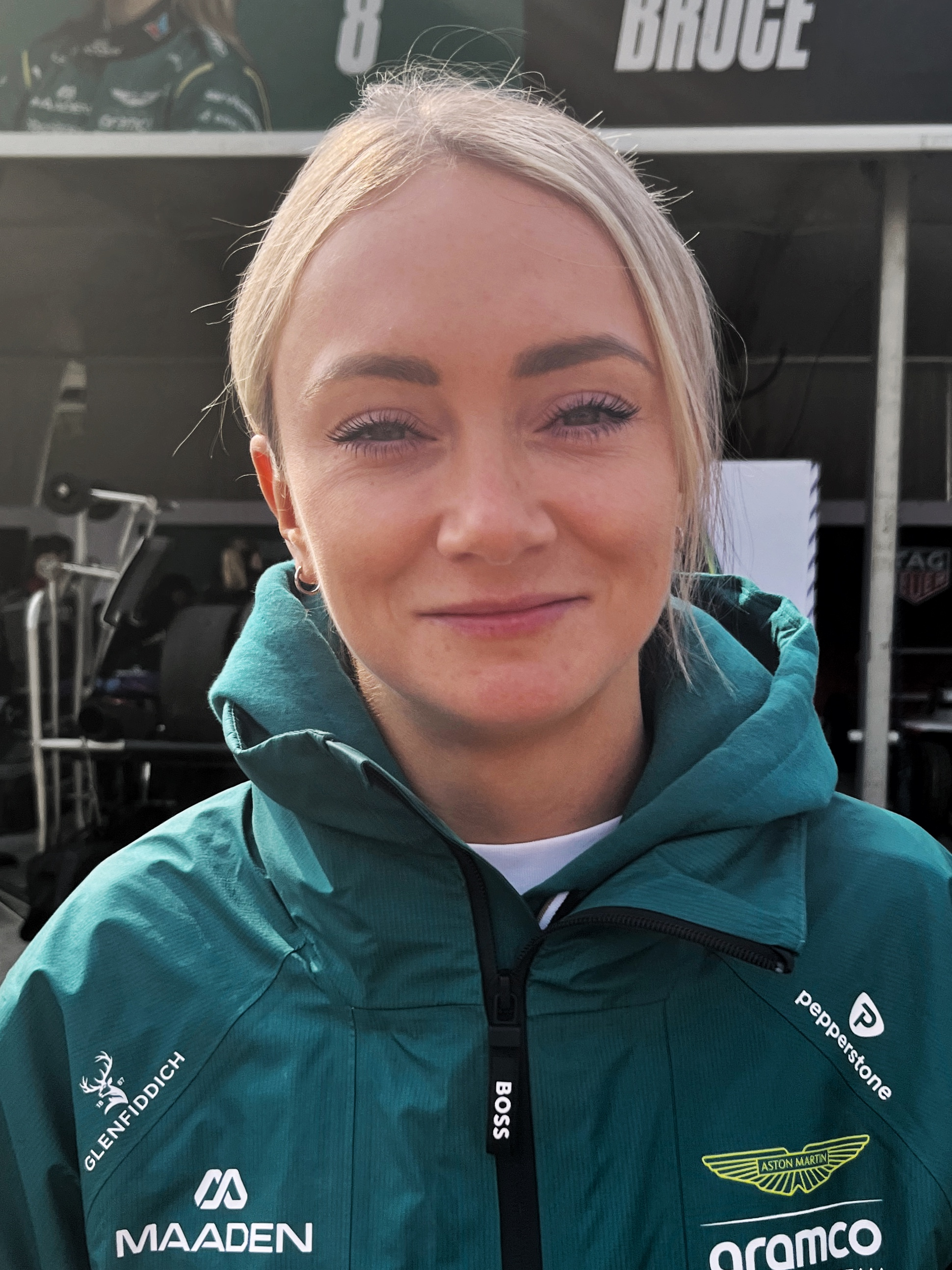
- Hawkins at the 2026 Chinese Grand Prix
- Nationality: (United Kingdom) British
- Born: Jessica Mary Hawkins; 16 February 1995 (age 31) Headley, East Hampshire, England

GTWCE Endurance - Bronze Cup career
- Debut season: 2025
- Current team: Comtoyou Racing
- Categorisation: FIA Silver
- Car number: 270
- Starts: 6 (7 entries)
- Wins: 0
- Podiums: 0
- Poles: 0
- Fastest laps: 0

Previous series
- 2024 2023 2023 2019, 2021–22 2020 2019–20 2016, 2018 2017 2015–16 2015 2014: British GT Championship; Zeo Prototype Cup - Class A Britcar Prototype Cup - Praga; W Series; British Touring Car Championship; Jaguar I-Pace eTrophy; Volkswagen Racing Cup GB; Mini Challenge UK; MRF Challenge Formula 2000; MSA Formula; British Formula Ford Championship

Championship titles
- 2026 2023: British GT - GT4 Silver; Zeo Prototype Cup - Class A

Jessica Mary "Jess" Hawkins (born 16 February 1995) is a British racing driver and stunt driver from East Hampshire, England. She currently competes in the 2025 GT World Challenge Europe Endurance Cup for Comtoyou Racing and also serves as driver ambassador for the Aston Martin Formula One Team. Hawkins previously competed in the 2024 British GT Championship driving for Beechdean Motorsport.

== Career ==
Hawkins made her professional motorsport debut in British Formula Ford at Silverstone, in a one-off event where she twice finished inside the top ten. Her strong rookie performance saw her being picked up by Falcon Motorsport to contest the 2015 MSA Formula Championship. She had to wait until the fourth round of the championship at Oulton Park to make her debut, and only completed half of the ten-round championship – finishing 11th twice and placing 23rd in the championship. She entered the Bahrain round of the 2015–16 MRF Challenge but finished 15th in both races.

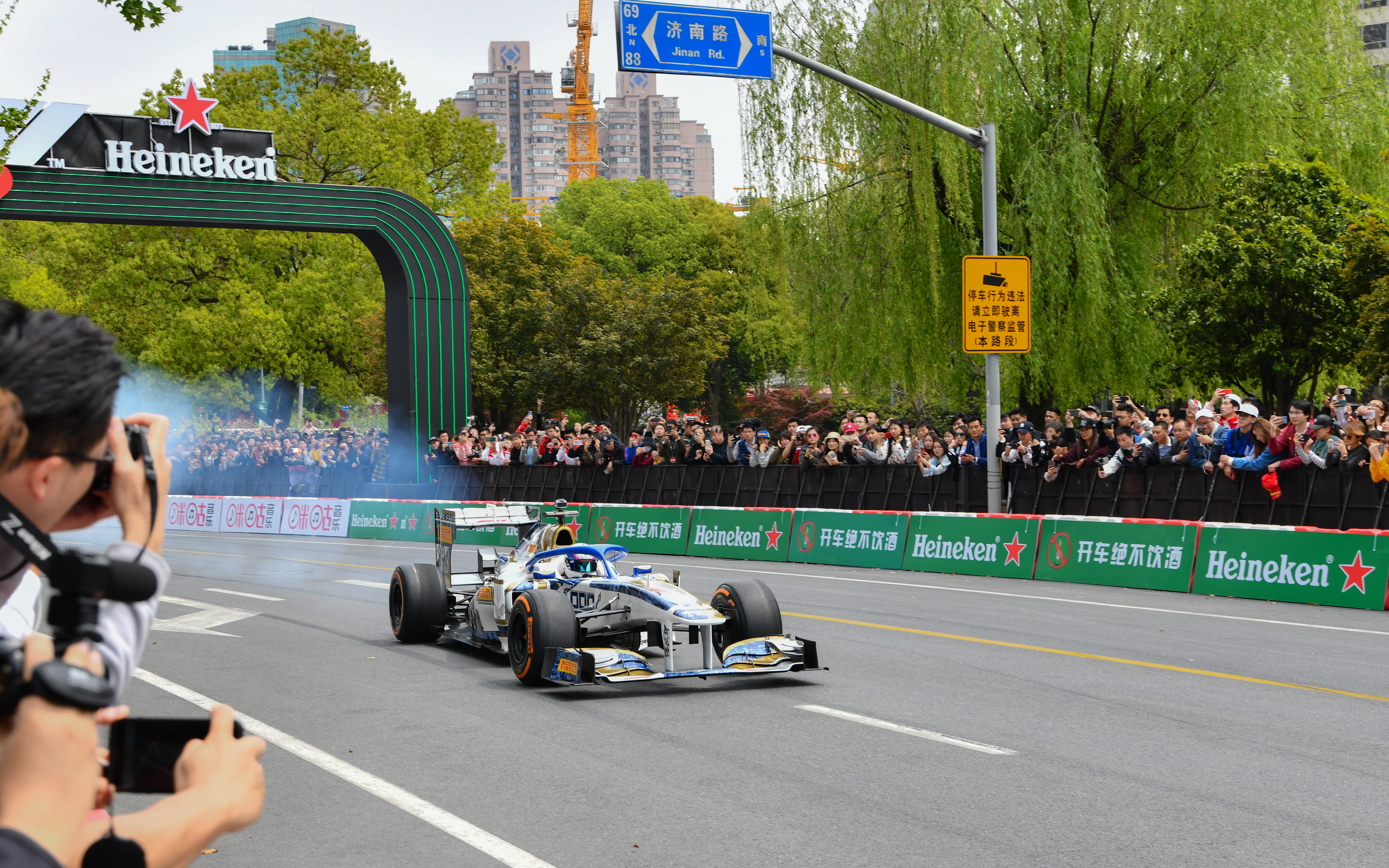
Hawkins conducting a demonstration run in a Sauber C30.

In 2016, Hawkins moved into single-make racing, competing in the Volkswagen Racing Cup series. She crossed over to the Mini Challenge in 2017, scoring six class wins and finishing runner-up to Matt Hammond in the Pro division. Hawkins returned to the VW Cup in 2018, spending most of that year working as a stunt driver on Fast and Furious Live. In 2019, she moved to the newly-formed women-only W Series, where she finished the championship 11th after two points finishes in the last two races of the season. In 2020, after the cancellation of the W Series season due to the COVID-19 pandemic, Hawkins made her debut in the BTCC racing for Power Maxed Racing at Snetterton – qualifying 22nd and scoring only one top-20 finish.

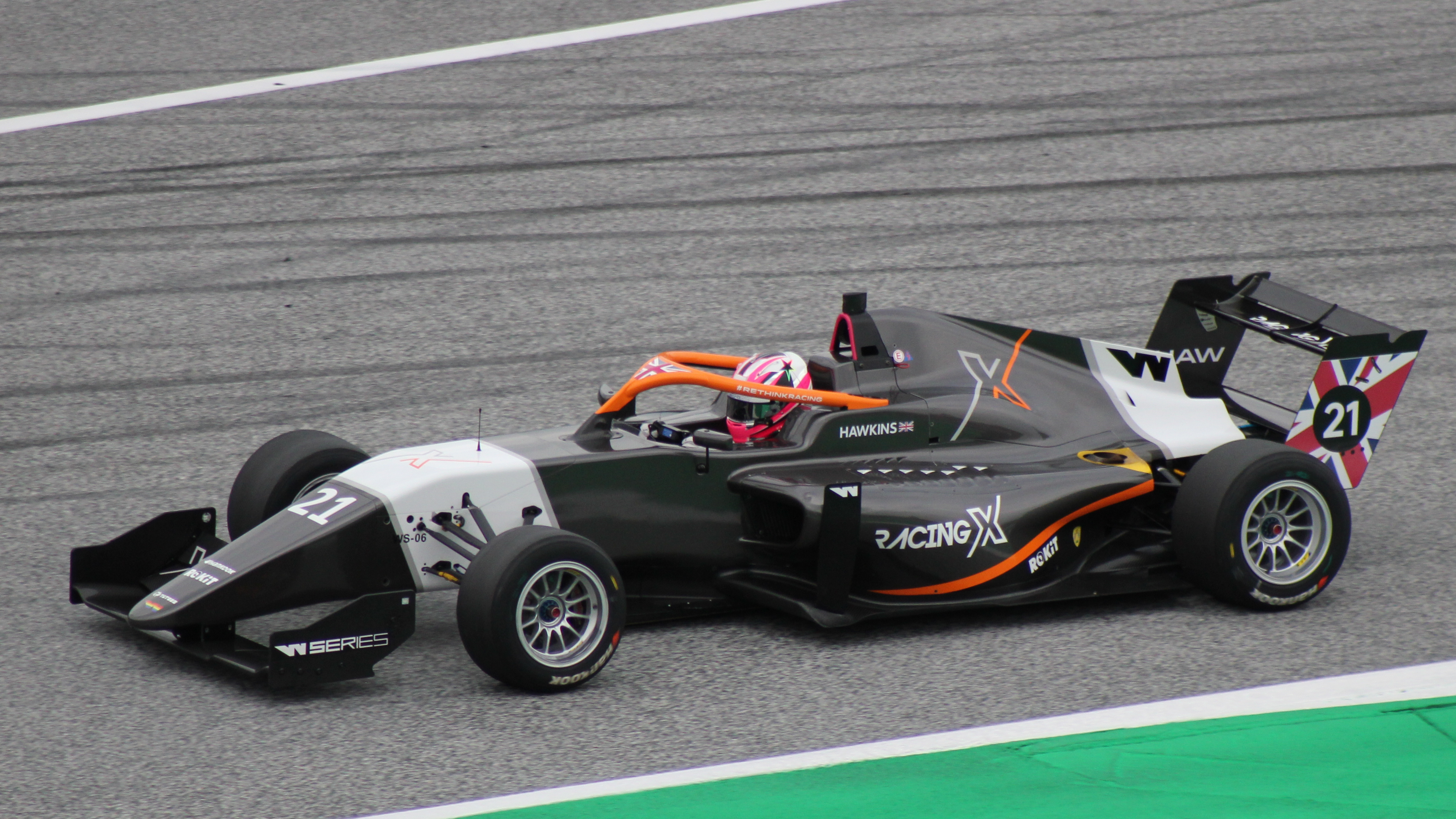
Hawkins at the Red Bull Ring in the 2021 W Series

Hawkins continued working as a stunt driver in 2021, featuring in the James Bond film No Time to Die. On 19 May, she was announced as the driver ambassador for the Aston Martin F1 Team. She returned to W Series for the second edition of the championship, once again placing 11th in the standings, with four points finishes between the Hungary and US races, including a fifth place finish in Zandvoort. She also made a one-off return to the BTCC at Snetterton, replacing Andy Neate having elected to sit out the event, with a best finish of 21st in three races.

In September 2023, Hawkins tested the Aston Martin AMR21 over 26 laps at Hungaroring, becoming the first female driver to test an F1 car since Tatiana Calderón with Sauber in 2018. In November, Aston Martin announced that Hawkins' role within the team will be extended as the team's head of racing for F1 Academy, where she is working with Aston Martin's F1 Academy representative Tina Hausmann.

== Sportscar racing ==
=== British GT Championship ===
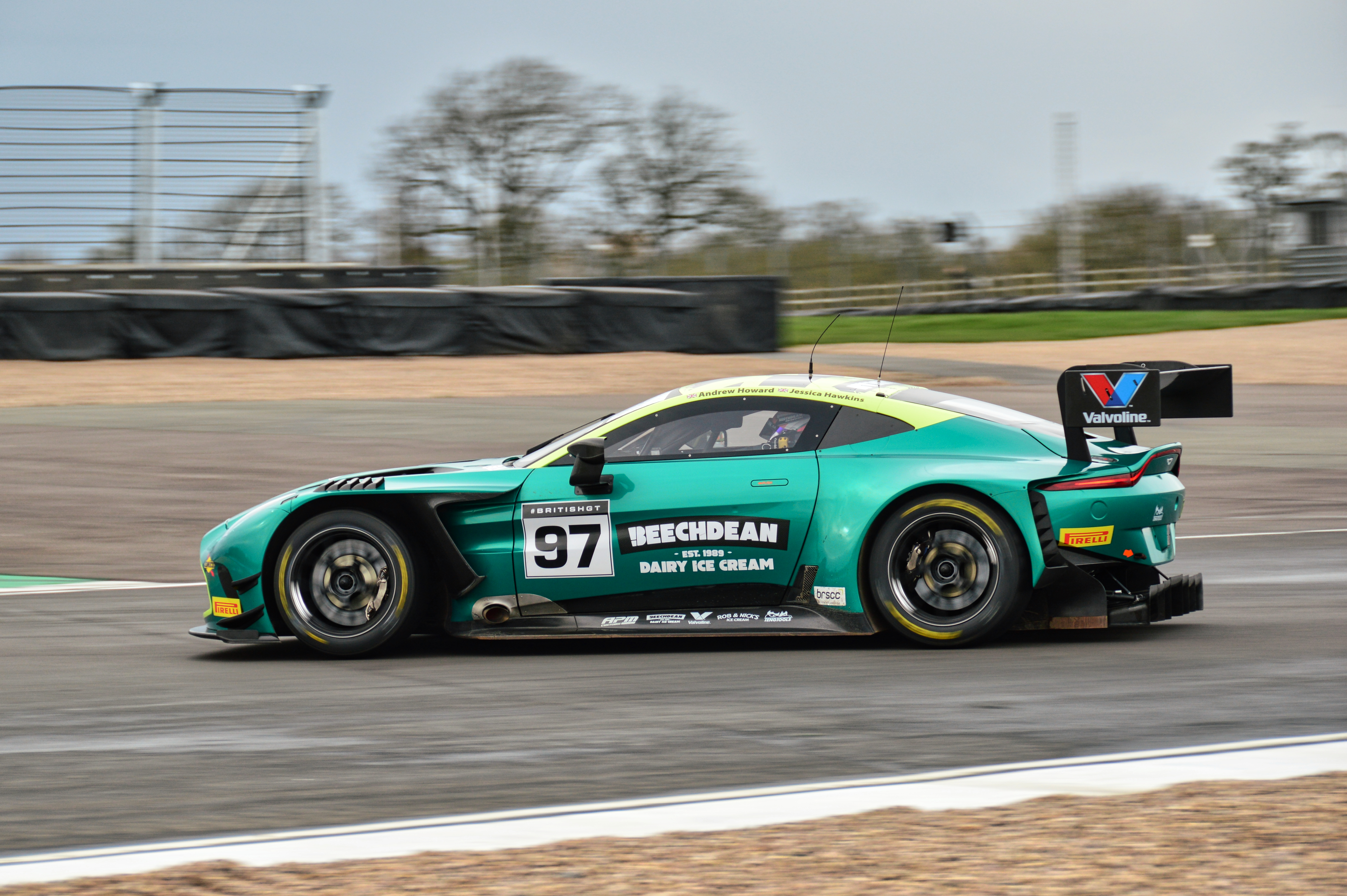
Hawkins' Beechdean Aston Martin in 2024.

In 2024, Hawkins and the Aston Martin Formula One Team announced that she would compete in the 2024 British GT Championship driving the new Aston Martin Vantage AMR GT3 for Beechdean Motorsport alongside team owner Andrew Howard. She would have middling results, finishing a high of seventh in race one at Donington Park.

=== GT World Challenge Europe ===
==== 2025 ====
For 2025, Hawkins returned to GT3 racing, this time entering the 2025 GT World Challenge Europe Endurance Cup driving the No. 270 Aston Martin Vantage AMR GT3 Evo for Comtoyou Racing.

== Personal life ==
Hawkins is openly gay. She was previously in a relationship with Abbie Eaton, also a British racing driver.

Hawkins holds the 0-100 mph lawnmower record.

== Racing record ==
=== Career summary ===
Season	Series	Team	Races	Wins	Poles	F/Laps	Podiums	Points	Position
2014	British Formula Ford Championship	MBM Motorsport	3	0	0	0	0	0	NC
2015	MSA Formula	Falcon Motorsport	15	0	0	0	0	13	23rd
2015–16	MRF Challenge Formula 2000	MRF Racing	2	0	0	0	0	0	27th
2016	Volkswagen Racing Cup GB	Team HARD Racing	3	0	0	0	0	54	22nd
2017	Mini Challenge UK - Pro	Excelr8 Motorsport	18	5	3	1	13	727	**2nd**
2018	Volkswagen Racing Cup GB	Allumy Motorsport	2	0	0	0	0	36	25th
2019	W Series	Hitech GP	6	0	0	0	0	12	11th
2019–20	Jaguar I-Pace eTrophy	Jaguar VIP Car	2	0	0	0	0	0	NC
2020	British Touring Car Championship	Power Maxed Racing	3	0	0	0	0	0	33rd
2021	W Series	Racing X	8	0	0	0	0	27	11th
2021	British Touring Car Championship	Racing with Wera & Photon Group	3	0	0	0	0	0	33rd
2022	TCR UK Touring Car Championship	FastR Racing Team	11	1	0	0	1	129	14th
2022	W Series	Click2Drive Bristol Street Motors Racing	7	0	0	0	1	37	9th
2023	Britcar Prototype Cup - Praga	University of Wolverhampton Racing	3	1	0	1	2	54	**2nd**
2023	Zeo Prototype Cup - Class A	University of Wolverhampton Racing	6	5	2	4	5	N/A	**1st**
2024	British GT Championship - GT3	Beechdean Motorsport	6	0	0	0	0	9	19th
2025	GT World Challenge Europe Endurance Cup	Comtoyou Racing	4	0	0	0	0	0	NC
2025	GT World Challenge Europe Endurance Cup - Bronze	Comtoyou Racing	4	0	0	0	0	0	NC
2025	GT World Challenge Europe Sprint Cup	Comtoyou Racing	2	0	0	0	0	0	NC
2025	GT World Challenge Europe Sprint Cup - Silver	Comtoyou Racing	2	0	0	0	0	1	17th
2026	British GT Championship - GT4	MK Racing	8	0	0	0	5	143.5	**2nd**

=== Complete British Formula Ford Championship/MSA Formula results ===
(key) (Races in bold indicate pole position; races in italics indicate fastest lap)

Year	Team	1	2	3	4	5	6	7	8	9	10	11	12	13	14	15	16	17	18	19	20	21	22	23	24	25	26	27	28	29	30	DC	Points
2014	MBM Motorsport	BHI; 1	BHI; 2	BHI; 3	DON; 1	DON; 2	DON; 3	THR; 1	THR; 2	THR; 3	OUL; 1	OUL; 2	OUL; 3	CRO; 1	CRO; 2	CRO; 3	SNE; 1	SNE; 2	SNE; 3	KNO; 1	KNO; 2	KNO; 3	ROC; 1	ROC; 2	ROC; 3	SIL; 1; 10	SIL; 2; 11	SIL; 3; 10	BHGP; 1	BHGP; 2	BHGP; 3	NC	-
2015	Falcon Motorsport	BHI; 1	BHI; 2	BHI; 3	DON; 1	DON; 2	DON; 3	THR; 1	THR; 2	THR; 3	OUL; 1; 19	OUL; 2; 19	OUL; 3; 15	CRO; 1; 15	CRO; 2; 14	CRO; 3; 13	SNE; 1; 14	SNE; 2; 17	SNE; 3; 11	KNO; 1; 12	KNO; 2 Ret	KNO; 3; 14	ROC; 1; 11	ROC; 2 Ret	ROC; 3; 12	SIL; 1	SIL; 2	SIL; 3	BHGP; 1	BHGP; 2	BHGP; 3	23rd	13

=== Complete MRF Challenge Formula 2000 Championship results ===
(key) (Races in bold indicate pole position) (Races in italics indicate fastest lap)

Year	1	2	3	4	5	6	7	8	9	10	11	12	13	14	DC	Point
2015-16	ABU; 1	ABU; 2	ABU; 3	ABU; 4	BHR; 1; 15	BHR; 2; 15	DUB; 1	DUB; 2	DUB; 3	DUB; 4	CHE; 1	CHE; 2	CHE; 3	CHE; 4	27th	0

=== Complete W Series results ===
(key) (Races in bold indicate pole position) (Races in italics indicate fastest lap)

Year	Team	1	2	3	4	5	6	7	8	DC	Points
2019	Hitech GP	HOC; 11	ZOL; 13	MIS; 15	NOR; Ret	ASS; 7	BRH; 7			11th	12
2021	Racing X	RBR; 16	RBR; 16	SIL; 16	HUN; 10	SPA; 6	ZAN; 5	COA; 6	COA; 15	11th	27
2022	Click2Drive Bristol Street Motors Racing	MIA; 2	MIA; 18†	CAT; 11	SIL; 6	LEC; 10	HUN; 14	SIN; 5		9th	37

^{†} Did not finish, but was classified having completed 90% of the race distance.

=== Complete British Touring Car Championship results ===
(key) (Races in bold indicate pole position – 1 point awarded just in first race; races in italics indicate fastest lap – 1 point awarded all races; * signifies that driver led race for at least one lap – 1 point given all races)

Year	Team	Car	1	2	3	4	5	6	7	8	9	10	11	12	13	14	15	16	17	18	19	20	21	22	23	24	25	26	27	28	29	30	DC	Points
2020	Power Maxed Car Care Racing	Vauxhall Astra	DON; 1	DON; 2	DON; 3	BRH; 1	BRH; 2	BRH; 3	OUL; 1	OUL; 2	OUL; 3	KNO; 1	KNO; 2	KNO; 3	THR; 1	THR; 2	THR; 3	SIL; 1	SIL; 2	SIL; 3	CRO; 1	CRO; 2	CRO; 3	SNE; 1; 22	SNE; 2; 21	SNE; 3; 20	BRH; 1	BRH; 2	BRH; 3				33rd	0
2021	Racing with Wera & Photon Group	Ford Focus ST	THR; 1	THR; 2	THR; 3	SNE; 3; 23	SNE; 1; 21	SNE; 3; 23	BRH; 1	BRH; 2	BRH; 3	OUL; 1	OUL; 2	OUL; 3	KNO; 1	KNO; 2	KNO; 3	THR; 1	THR; 2	THR; 3	CRO; 1	CRO; 2	CRO; 3	SIL; 1	SIL; 2	SIL; 3	DON; 1	DON; 2	DON; 3	BRH; 1	BRH; 2	BRH; 3	33rd	0

=== Complete TCR UK Touring Car Championship results ===
(key) (Races in bold indicate pole position – 1 point awarded just in first race; races in italics indicate fastest lap – 1 point awarded all races; * signifies that driver led race for at least one lap – 1 point given all races)

Year	Team	Car	1	2	3	4	5	6	7	8	9	10	11	12	13	14	15	DC	Points
2022	Area Motorsport with FastR	Cupra León TCR	OUL; 1; 9	OUL; 2; 1	DON; 1 Ret	DON; 2; 10	BRH; 1 Ret	BRH; 2; 11	BRH; 3; 10	OUL; 1 Ret	OUL; 2 Ret	CAS; 1; 6	CAS; 2; 5	DON; 1 DNS	DON; 2 DNS	SNE; 1	SNE; 2	14th	129

=== Complete British GT Championship results ===
(key) (Races in bold indicate pole position) (Races in italics indicate fastest lap)

Year	Team	Car	Class	1	2	3	4	5	6	7	8	9	DC	Points
2024	Beechdean AMR	Aston Martin Vantage AMR GT3	GT3	OUL; 1; 18	OUL; 2; 15	SIL; 1; 16	DON; 1; 11	SPA; 1 Ret	SNE; 1	SNE; 2	DON; 1; 7	BRH; 1	19th	9
2026	MK Racing	Aston Martin Vantage AMR GT4 Evo	GT4	SIL; 1; 15	OUL; 1; 15	OUL; 2; 14	SPA; 1; 17	SNE; 1; 13	SNE; 2; 17	DON; 1; 15	BRH; 1; 13		2nd	143.5

=== Complete GT World Challenge Europe results ===
==== GT World Challenge Europe Endurance Cup ====
Year	Team	Car	Class	1	2	3	4	5	6	7	Pos.	Points
2025	Comtoyou Racing	Aston Martin Vantage AMR GT3 Evo	Bronze	LEC; 11	MNZ; WD	SPA; 6Hrs; 71†	SPA; 12Hrs; 71†	SPA; 24Hrs; Ret	NÜR; 48	CAT; 48	NC	0

==== GT World Challenge Europe Sprint Cup results ====
Year	Team	Car	Class	1	2	3	4	5	6	7	8	9	10	Pos.	Points
2025	Comtoyou Racing	Aston Martin Vantage AMR GT3 Evo	Silver	BRH; 1	BRH; 2	ZAN; 1	ZAN; 2	MIS; 1	MIS; 2	MAG; 1	MAG; 2	VAL; 1 Ret	VAL; 2; 35	17th	1

Sporting positions
Preceded by Harry George; Luca Hopkinson	British GT Championship; GT4 Silver Champion; 2026; With: Will Orton	Succeeded by Incumbent
