= 2019 Assen W Series round =

2019 Assen W Series Round
- Race 5 of 6 of the 2019 W Series

Race details
- Date: 20 July 2019
- Official name: 2019 W Series Assen round
- Location: TT Circuit Assen, Assen, Drenthe, Netherlands
- Course: Permanent circuit
- Course length: 4.555 km (2.829 miles)
- Distance: 19 laps, 86.545 km (53.751 miles)

Pole position
- Driver: (Finland) Emma Kimiläinen
- Time: 1:34.758

Fastest lap
- Driver: (Finland) Emma Kimiläinen
- Time: 1:35.384

Podium
- First: (Finland) Emma Kimiläinen
- Second: (United Kingdom) Alice Powell
- Third: (United Kingdom) Jamie Chadwick

The 2019 W Series Assen round (also commercially referred to as #WRace5) was the fifth round of the 2019 W Series, and took place at the TT Circuit Assen in the Netherlands on 20 July 2019. The event was an undercard to the 2019 Deutsche Tourenwagen Masters round at the same circuit.

== Report ==
=== Background ===
Heading into the event, Jamie Chadwick leads the championship on 83 points as the only driver to score a podium at all 4 events. Having beaten Chadwick to second in Nuremberg, Beitske Visser closed the gap to ten points with two races remaining. Norisring race winner Marta García sits third, a further thirteen points behind Visser but still within maximum points of the series lead. Mathematically, both Fabienne Wohlwend and Alice Powell are still in title contention – however Wohlwend sits more than an event's worth of points behind Chadwick whereas Powell needs to win both races and all four to finish outside the top ten in both races to win the championship on a countback.

On 28 June it was announced that an additional non-championship race would be held to assist the series in experimenting with new formats for future seasons. The race will be held on 21 July, with a full-field reverse grid set to the same race distance as previous events.

The day before the event begun, W Series management would confirm the prize pool for the 2019 season as well as entry details for the 2020 season.

=== Practice ===
Ahead of Practice, Megan Gilkes would be reinstated as 'main driver' having been demoted to 'reserve driver' in Nuremberg. Vivien Keszthelyi would return to the reserve driver role.

Finnish driver Emma Kimiläinen dominated the opening session of the weekend, setting the first representative time and maintaining the top spot throughout. The only driver in the field to have raced at Assen previously, having done so in 2008, would finish nearly three tenths clear of Friday gun Jessica Hawkins and Norisring retirement Sarah Moore.

Moore would finish on top of the second practice session. Despite the later than usual session time, laptimes would prove to be slower overall than in the first session. Vittoria Piria would be second fastest with a late time putting her 0.25sec adrift of Moore, with championship leader Chadwick third. Home favourite and championship contender Visser would end the session down in 12th place.

=== Qualifying ===
Qualifying would commence at 9:30am CET. Kimiläinen would start Saturday where she left off on Friday, with the first fast representative time. With the lingering threat of rain, drivers began to push early on. Esmee Hawkey would find trouble, first spinning on the exit of turn five and later in the lap launching into a wheelie off one of the sawtooth kerbs. Alice Powell would then move to the top of the times, however the Finn would soon take the position back. Drivers would start pushing track limits, with Moore bouncing across the same kerb that caught out Hawkey whilst Fabienne Wohlwend would damage her front wing on another. With five minutes remaining in the session, Shea Holbrook would spin into the gravel and bring out a red flag. A closing minutes dash for times would ensue, however before drivers could complete their laps Piria would suffer from an engine failure out on the circuit and bring a premature end to the session. Kimiläinen would maintain pole ahead of Powell and Chadwick, with Caitlin Wood having her best result of the season with sixth.

=== Championship race ===
Kimiläinen would make an average start from pole position, with Powell moving ahead and Chadwick attempting to drive between the two however would be unable to make the move work. Further back, a bottleneck at the first corner would see Tasmin Pepper lose the rear end on the wet kerb from earlier rain and spin, with an unsighted Miki Koyama crashing into her. Koyama would retire on the spot, whilst Pepper would make it back to the pits but the damage would be deemed terminal. Koyama's stranded car would bring out the safety car.

Having passed Visser at the start, Wood started to form a train from fourth place back. Wohlwend would attempt a move on Gosia Rdest for sixth, but broke her wing on a kerb and was forced into the pits to replace it. Holbrook would take a trip through the gravel at the final chicane at the back of the field, whilst Sabré Cook would receive a drive-though penalty for starting out of position. Visser managed to get past Wood not long after.

With ten minutes remaining, Kimiläinen would force Powell into an error at the first corner – the Briton running wide and ceding the lead to the Finn. Championship contenders Chadwick and Visser would start to battle over the final place on the podium, however with two laps remaining Visser would lock a front brake at turn five and would lose time on Chadwick.

Upon taking the lead, Kimiläinen would sprint away at nearly a second a lap and would take a comfortable win over Alice Powell, Jamie Chadwick and Beitske Visser. Caitlin Wood and Gosia Rdest would achieve season-best results behind with fifth and sixth, while Jessica Hawkins would score her first points of the season in seventh. The top ten would be rounded out by Vittoria Piria, Marta García and Sarah Moore. Poor results for García and Wohlwend would see the championship fight narrowed down to just Chadwick and Visser, with thirteen points separating the pair. Kimiläinen's dominant performance would also see her claim the first 'Grand Slam' (pole position, fastest lap of the race and race win) in W Series history.

=== Non-championship race ===
The following day, a non-championship race was held in order to test a reverse-grid format. All 20 drivers would line up for a W Series race for the first time, with the grid set in reverse championship order. Megan Gilkes would therefore start the race from pole position, ahead of reserve driver Sarah Bovy and Shea Holbrook.

== Classification ==
=== Practice ===
Session	No.	Driver	Time	Condts
Practice 1	7	(Finland) Emma Kimiläinen	1:34.195	Dry
Practice 2	26	(United Kingdom) Sarah Moore	1:34.247	Dry

=== Qualifying ===
Pos.	No.	Driver	Time/Gap	Grid
1	7	(Finland) Emma Kimiläinen	1:34.758	1
2	27	(United Kingdom) Alice Powell	+0.127	2
3	55	(United Kingdom) Jamie Chadwick	+0.173	3
4	95	(Netherlands) Beitske Visser	+0.181	4
5	26	(United Kingdom) Sarah Moore	+0.342	10^{1}
6	20	(Australia) Caitlin Wood	+0.353	5
7	31	(South Africa) Tasmin Pepper	+0.497	6
8	5	(Liechtenstein) Fabienne Wohlwend	+0.513	7
9	19	(Spain) Marta García	+0.550	8
10	3	(Poland) Gosia Rdest	+0.571	9
11	21	(United Kingdom) Jessica Hawkins	+0.587	11
12	11	(Italy) Vittoria Piria	+0.902	12
13	85	(Japan) Miki Koyama	+0.965	13
14	37	(United States) Sabré Cook	+1.126	14
15	2	(United Kingdom) Esmee Hawkey	+1.135	15
16	99	(Germany) Naomi Schiff	+1.269	16
17	49	(Canada) Megan Gilkes	+1.400	17
18	67	(United States) Shea Holbrook	+1.597	18

- ^1 Moore would receive a five-place grid penalty for causing a collision in the previous race.

=== Championship race ===
Pos.	No.	Driver	Laps	Time/Retired	Grid	Pts
1	7	(Finland) Emma Kimiläinen	19	32:20.386	1	25
2	27	(United Kingdom) Alice Powell	19	+5.767	2	18
3	55	(United Kingdom) Jamie Chadwick	19	+8.762	3	15
4	95	(Netherlands) Beitske Visser	19	+9.363	4	12
5	20	(Australia) Caitlin Wood	19	+18.579	5	10
6	3	(Poland) Gosia Rdest	19	+20.077	9	8
7	21	(United Kingdom) Jessica Hawkins	19	+22.481	11	6
8	11	(Italy) Vittoria Piria	19	+25.105	12	4
9	19	(Spain) Marta García	19	+25.636	8	2
10	26	(United Kingdom) Sarah Moore	19	+25.839	10	1
11	2	(United Kingdom) Esmee Hawkey	19	+33.919	15	
12	99	(Germany) Naomi Schiff	19	+41.869	16	
13	37	(United States) Sabré Cook	19	+50.614	14	
14	49	(Canada) Megan Gilkes	19	+55.456	17	
15	5	(Liechtenstein) Fabienne Wohlwend	19	+1:04.644	7	
16	67	(United States) Shea Holbrook	18	+1 lap	18	
Ret	31	(South Africa) Tasmin Pepper	1	Crash damage	6	
Ret	85	(Japan) Miki Koyama	0	Crash	13	
Fastest lap set by Emma Kimiläinen: 1:35.384

=== Non-championship race ===
Pos.	No.	Driver	Laps	Time/Retired	Grid
1	49	(Canada) Megan Gilkes	18	32:21.283	1
2	27	(United Kingdom) Alice Powell	18	+0.003	17
3	37	(United States) Sabré Cook	18	+0.347	8
4	7	(Finland) Emma Kimiläinen	18	+0.537	15
5	21	(United Kingdom) Jessica Hawkins	18	+0.715	7
6	31	(South Africa) Tasmin Pepper	18	+1.817	12
7	99	(Germany) Naomi Schiff	18	+1.966	5
8	55	(United Kingdom) Jamie Chadwick	18	+2.324	20
9	11	(Italy) Vicky Piria	18	+2.704	11
10	26	(United Kingdom) Sarah Moore	18	+3.101	13
11	58	(Belgium) Sarah Bovy	18	+5.241	2
12	20	(Australia) Caitlin Wood	18	+5.510	10
13	19	(Spain) Marta García	18	+5.695	18
14	95	(Netherlands) Beitske Visser	18	+6.085	19
15	85	(Japan) Miki Koyama	18	+6.530	14
16	2	(United Kingdom) Esmee Hawkey	18	+6.879	6
17	77	(Hungary) Vivien Keszthelyi	18	+8.051	4
18	5	(Liechtenstein) Fabienne Wohlwend	18	+8.168	16
Ret	3	(Poland) Gosia Rdest	11	Crash	9
Ret	67	(United States) Shea Holbrook	8	Spun out	3
Fastest lap set by Sabré Cook: 1:36.059

== Championship standings ==
+/-	Pos.	Driver	Pts	Gap
	1	(United Kingdom) **Jamie Chadwick**	98	
	2	(Netherlands) **Beitske Visser**	85	-13
	3	(Spain) Marta García	62	-36
1	4	(United Kingdom) Alice Powell	51	-47
1	5	(Liechtenstein) Fabienne Wohlwend	41	-57

- Drivers represented in **bold** are in mathematical contention for the championship.

== See also ==
- 2019 DTM Assen round

Previous race: 2019 W Series Nuremberg round	W Series; 2019 season	Next race: 2019 W Series Brands Hatch round
