= Abbie Eaton =

British racing driver

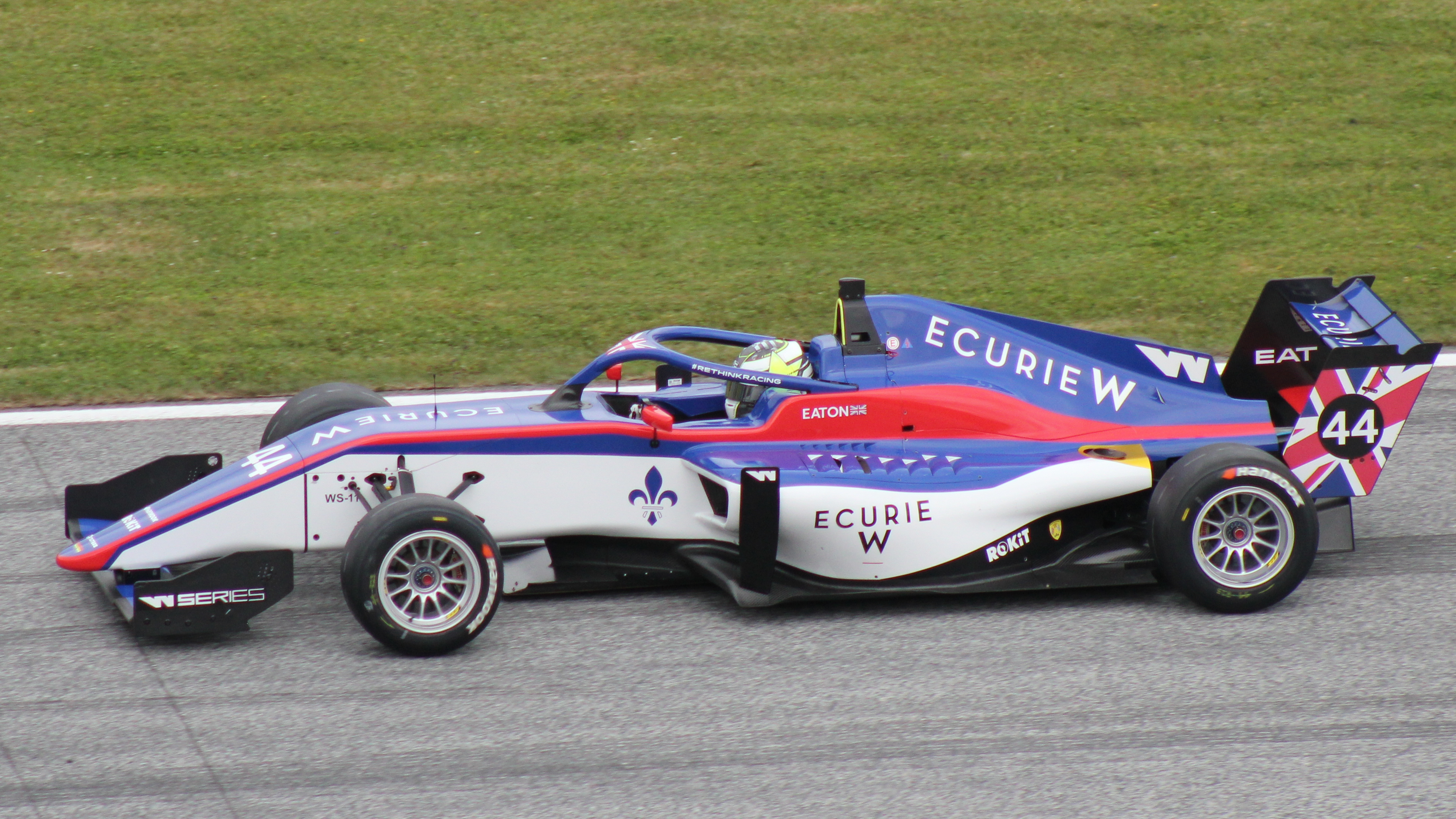
- Eaton in 2021
- Nationality: (United Kingdom) British
- Born: Abigail Eaton; 2 January 1992 (age 34) Hull, England

British GT career
- Debut season: 2009
- Current team: AE Racing
- Categorisation: FIA Silver
- Car number: 44
- Starts: 101
- Wins: 25
- Podiums: 38
- Poles: 4
- Fastest laps: 16

Previous series
- Cadet, Minimax, Junior Max, Saxmax, Production Touring car Championship, British GT, Blancpain GT

Championship titles
- 2010 2014: Production Touring Car Class B Mazda MX-5 Supercup

Abigail Eaton (born 2 January 1992) is an English racing driver who most recently competed in the Classic Chesire Challenge for Smallest Cog Racing in a MGB GT. She is also instructor and performance coach from the East Riding of Yorkshire, England. She is best known for starring as the test driver for the second and third series of The Grand Tour, an Amazon Prime Video-exclusive motoring series.

== Racing career ==
=== Karting ===
Eaton began kart racing at the age of ten in the Comer cadet class, gaining invaluable track craft along with numerous podiums and wins. She then resumed kart racing for three more years, moving up into Minimax and then Rotax Junior, competing in the Super 1 series.

=== SAXMAX ===
Eaton completed her first season racing cars in 2007, in the SAXMAX Championship at various tracks around the United Kingdom with a highest position of fourth place. In 2008, Eaton returned to the SAXMAX championship and led for most of the year but ended in fourth place, with three podiums and two fastest laps.

=== Dunlop SportMaxx Production Cup & British GT ===
In 2009, Eaton moved into her first year of adult car racing in the Dunlop SportMaxx Production Cup, driving a Vauxhall Corsa SRi-R. She won the class B championship outright with 9/18 wins, sixteen podium positions, and seven fastest laps, finishing second overall in the championship.

In 2010, Eaton was without a team when her British GT debut fell through a few weeks before the season was due to start. However, she did manage to make one race in the Mazda MX-5 Mk1 championship, finishing third out of over 90 entries.

=== Mazda MX-5 Cup ===
In 2011, Eaton raced a rear wheel drive Mazda MX-5 Cup Mk3 car. After a tough season where she missed several rounds due to a lack of budget, Eaton managed to achieve eleven top-ten finishes and a third place qualifying position.

Eaton competed in a handful of races in the 2012 Mazda MX-5 Cup, but had to withdraw due to funding issues.

=== Mazda MX-5 Supercup ===
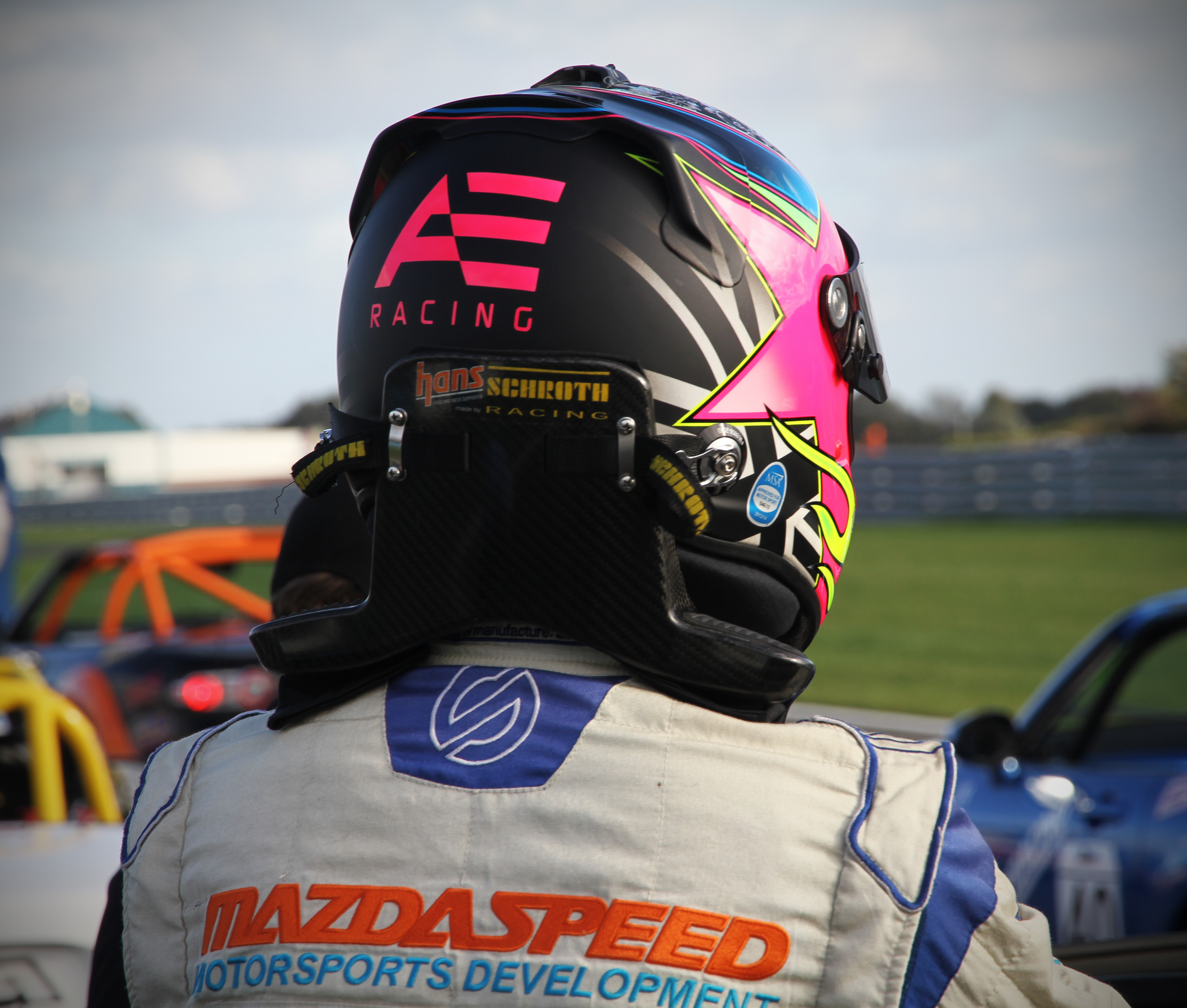
Eaton's own "AE Racing" logo on her 2014 racing helmet, with a Mazdaspeed logo on her back

In 2013, Eaton raced in the last three races of the Mazda MX-5 SuperCup with a win, two second places, one third and one fourth. She also raced in the Autumn Challenge and achieved two second places.

In 2014, Eaton returned to the British Racing and Sports Car Club (BRSCC) Mazda MX-5 Supercup Championship for the last time. Despite car troubles early in the season, Eaton went on to achieve five wins, seven podium finishes, six fastest laps, two pole positions, and a new lap record. She was crowned the 2014 Mazda MX-5 Supercup Champion. During a race at the Anglesey Circuit, she qualified on pole position eight-tenths of a second ahead of second placed position, and went on to win, set the fastest lap, and then set a new lap record, all within three races.

=== GT Cup ===
Eaton entered GT racing via the UK-based GT Cup Championship. She competed for part of the season in the GTB class in a BMW E46 M3 GTR run by Geoff Steel Racing. Eaton achieved one win, eight podium finishes, and three fastest laps.

=== British GT ===
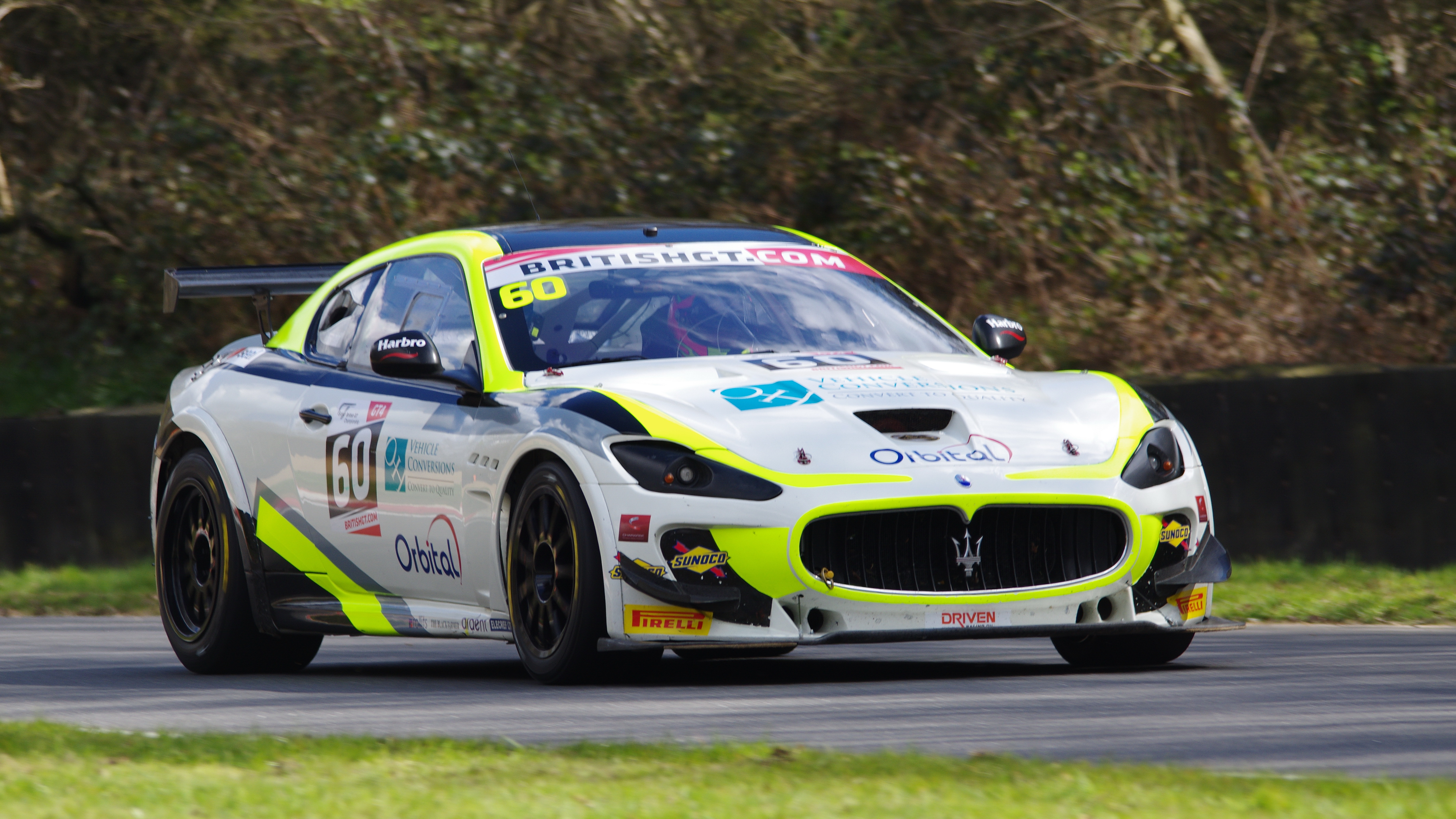
Abbie Eaton and Marcus Hoggarth's Maserati GT4 at the Brands Hatch motor racing circuit in 2016

In 2016, Eaton moved to the British GT Championship in a Maserati Granturismo MC GT4, the first time that Maserati had been in the British GT for over 20 years. She shared driving duties with Marcus Hoggarth, and their team placed second in the Pro/Am Championship and fourth overall.

Eaton made a one-off return to the series in 2023 finale, competing in GT3 for Fox Motorsport alongside John Seale. They retired from the race.

=== Blancpain GT ===
In 2017, Eaton began with a year out, and was then offered a one off drive for the 2017 Blancpain GT Series in a Ferrari 488 GT3 run by AF Corse. This was Eaton's first time in a GT3 specification car and first time at the Autodromo Nazionale Monza circuit in Italy. Following ten laps of practice, Eaton entered the race as one of the 52 cars starting, and finished in first position in the Am cup, making her the first female driver ever to win a class in the series. The car was number 961, driven by Eaton, Alex Demirdjian, and Davide Rizzo.

=== Super2 Series ===
In 2019, Eaton competed in the Super2 Series, an Australian Supercar championship, with Matt Stone Racing. However, she had to withdraw following the first round due to funding issues.

=== W Series ===
In 2021, Eaton joined W Series, driving for Écurie W. In the final round at the Circuit of the Americas, Eaton broke her back in an accident, requiring rehabilitation and a break from racing. She finished the season in 13th, with a best finish of sixth.

She returned to race in the W Series in 2022, competing for Scuderia W. She once again finished 13th in the standings overall, with a best result of seventh.

=== Lamborghini Super Trofeo ===
Eaton competed in the 2023 Lamborghini Super Trofeo Europe season with her own team Rebelleo Motorsport, supported by Bonaldi Motorsport. With her teammate "Daan Arrow", she claimed multiple top-ten finishes, including a podium at the Nürburgring, to finish seventh overall.

=== Porsche Carrera Cup ===
In 2024, Eaton competed in Porsche Carrera Cup Great Britain with her own team, Rebelleo Motorsport. In the penultimate round at Silverstone, she became the first female driver in series history to start from pole and win a race.

=== Fun Cup Endurance Championship ===
In 2026, Abbie teamed up with George Grant to race with Team Clapham North in the Fun Cup Endurance Championship in the UK. Abbie made an instant impact fighting for the lead from 3rd on the random grid draw in the first stint of the opening race at Oulton Park, followed by leading at Snetterton (again from 3rd on the grid). An incredible drive from 24th to 4th in her opening stint in Race 1 at Anglesey preceded her and the team's first top ten finish with 10th. before going one better in Race 2 at Donington Park with 9th. At the time of writing, Abbie, George and Team Clapham North are currently 11th in the points standings.

== Television career ==
Eaton appeared on ITV's Drive in 2015, coaching rapper Professor Green in various racing car challenges over a five-week period. This included mud buggy, stock car, and sports car races. Eaton and Professor Green were the most successful pairing, staying out of the eliminator night race and making it through to the final round. Eaton and Professor Green were crowned champions in the last episode.

Eaton appears as the test driver from the second series onwards of the British motoring show The Grand Tour, replacing the previous first series test driver Mike Skinner. James May stated in November 2017 that a large number of drivers had been tested, and that "she was the fastest and the best". Eaton was later introduced to the show in the second episode of the second series, on 15 December 2017, when she was shown testing a green Mercedes-AMG GT R around the Eboladrome test track. In the Mercedes, Eaton says "Right, here we go" to herself, before starting the lap and completing the test drive silently. Eaton did not have her name mentioned at all throughout the episode, only being referred to as "she", and her name was only shown in the credits at the end of the episode, credited as "driver".

Motor1.com speculated that The Grand Tour would likely be under legal restrictions, and needing to provide differentiation between The Grand Tour test driver and anonymous drivers such as the Stig. A spokesperson for Amazon suggested to Jalopnik of a compromise between the explicitly named "the American" test driver portrayed by Skinner, and being unable to use a completely anonymous driver like on Top Gear. During the first episode of the third series, Jeremy Clarkson referred to her simply as, "Abbie", suggesting that Amazon may have finally made a decision in this matter. During the fifth episode of the third season, Clarkson presents her at the beginning of a race by noting that the car "is being driven by The Grand Tour's racing driver, Abbie Eaton."

In April 2018, Eaton was interviewed by Red Bull about her work on The Grand Tour.

Eaton also appeared on Series 2 of the British reality show Richard Hammond's Workshop as a professional motorsport instructor to teach Anthony Greenhouse (a mechanic at Hammond's workshop) how to be a racing driver. Eaton and Greenhouse competed in the Classic Chesire Challenge as teammates. After the season, Eaton was replaced by Hammond due to costs but stayed on as mentor and advisor for Greenhouse.

== Personal life ==
Eaton lives in Northampton, England. Her father, Paul Eaton, is also a racing driver.

Eaton came out as a lesbian at the age of 17, and was previously in a relationship with fellow British racing driver Jessica Hawkins.

Eaton is a Driver Ambassador for Racing Pride, an LGBT rights charity working in the motorsport industry to promote inclusivity across the sport, and amongst its technological and commercial partners.

== Racing record ==
=== Career summary ===
Season	Series	Team	Races	Wins	Poles	F/Laps	Podiums	Points	Position
2008	SAXMAX	Eaton Motorsport	12	0	0	2	3	176	4th
2009	Dunlop SportMaxx Production Cup - Class B	Thorney Motorsport	18	15	2	7	16	173	**1st**
2010	Mazda MX-5 Championship	Eaton Motorsport	1	0	0	0	1	0	NC
2013	Mazda MX-5 SuperCup	Eaton Motorsport	8	1	0	1	6	0	NC
2014	Mazda MX-5 Supercup	AE Racing	18	5	2	4	7	1448	**1st**
2015	GT Cup Championship	Geoff Steel Racing	17	1	0	2	8	403	5th
2016	British GT Championship - GT4	Ebor GT	9	0	0	0	1	106	4th
2017	Blancpain GT Series Endurance Cup - Am	AF Corse	1	1	0	0	1	25	14th
2017	British GT Championship - GT4	Autoaid/RCIB Insurance Racing	1	0	0	0	0	12	21st
2019	Super2 Series	Matt Stone Racing	3	0	0	0	0	76	23rd
2019	Alpine Elf Europa Cup	Racing Technology	2	0	0	0	0	0	NC
2019–20	Jaguar I-Pace eTrophy	Jaguar VIP Car	5	0	0	0	0	0	N/C
2021	W Series	Écurie W	7	0	0	0	0	19	13th
2021	GT Cup Championship - GTO	JMH Automotive	5	3	4	4	3	0	NC
2021	Britcar Endurance Championship - Praga	Team Praga Three Lions	6	1	2	3	2	131	8th
2022	W Series	Scuderia W	7	0	0	0	0	11	13th
2023	Lamborghini Super Trofeo Europe	Bonaldi Motorsport	12	0	1	0	1	49	7th
2023	British GT Championship - GT3	Fox Motorsport	1	0	0	0	0	0	NC
2024	Porsche Carrera Cup Great Britain - Pro-Am	Rebelleo Motorsport	16	2	1	1	2	55	6th

=== Complete British GT Championship results ===
(key) (Races in bold indicate pole position in class) (Races in italics indicate fastest lap in class)

Year	Team	Car	Class	1	2	3	4	5	6	7	8	9	10	Pos	Points
2016	Ebor GT	Maserati GranTurismo MC GT4	GT4	BRH; 1; 17	ROC; 1; 15	OUL; 1 Ret	OUL; 2; 14	SIL; 1; 21	SPA; 1; 17	SNE; 1; 18	SNE; 2; 12	DON; 1; 12		4th	106
2017	Autoaid/RCIB Insurance Racing	Ginetta G55 GT4	GT4	OUL; 1	OUL; 2	ROC; 1	SNE; 1	SNE; 2	SIL; 1	SPA; 1	SPA; 2	BRH; 1	DON; 1; 12	21st	12
2023	Fox Motorsport	Lamborghini Huracán GT3 Evo 2	GT3	OUL; 1	OUL; 2	SIL; 1	DON; 1	SNE; 1	SNE; 2	ALG; 1	BRH; 1	DON; 1 Ret		NC†	0†

^{†} As Eaton was a guest driver, she was ineligible for points.

=== Complete Super2 Series results ===
(key) (Round results only)

Super2 Series results
Year	Team	Car	1	2	3	4	5	6	7	Position	Points
2019	Matt Stone Racing	Holden VF Commodore	ADE; 18	BAR	TOW	QLD	BAT	SAN	NEW	23rd	76

=== Complete W Series results ===
(key) (Races in bold indicate pole position) (Races in italics indicate fastest lap)

Year	Team	1	2	3	4	5	6	7	8	DC	Points
2021	Écurie W	RBR; 15	RBR; 6	SIL; 9	HUN; 13	SPA; 10	ZAN; 6	COA; Ret	COA; DNS	13th	19
2022	Scuderia W	MIA; Ret	MIA; 13	CAT; 16	SIL; 7	LEC; Ret	HUN; 8	SIN; 10		13th	11

* Season still in progress.
