= Vicky Piria =

Italian racecar driver (born 1993)

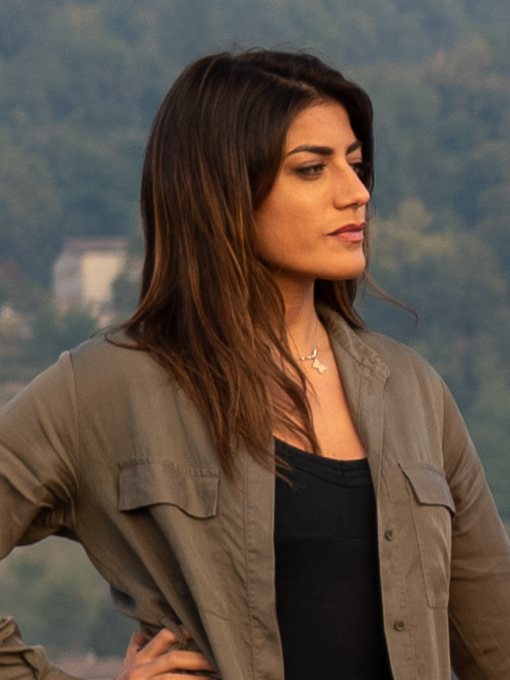
- Piria in 2019
- Nationality: (Italy) Italian (United Kingdom) British
- Born: Vittoria Piria; 11 November 1993 (age 32) Milan, Italy

GP3 Series career
- Debut season: 2012
- Current team: Trident Racing
- Categorisation: FIA Silver
- Car number: 23
- Starts: 16
- Wins: 0
- Poles: 0
- Fastest laps: 0
- Best finish: 26th in 2012

Previous series
- 2024 2022–2023 2020 2019, 2021 2018 2014 2013 2010–11 2009 2009 2009: E1 Series Championship; Italian GT Championship; Formula Renault Eurocup; W Series; Porsche Carrera Cup Italy; Pro Mazda Championship; European F3 Open Championship; Formula Abarth; Formula 2000 Light Italy; Formula Lista Junior; Formula Renault 2.0 Italy

Vittoria "Vicky" Piria (born 11 November 1993) is an Italian-British racing driver who races in Italian GT, and previously competed in the GP3 Series and W Series.

== Career ==
=== Karting ===
Born in Milan, Lombardia, Piria grew up in Perugia, in the Umbria region. She began karting in 2003 and raced primarily in her native Italy for the majority of this part of her career, working her way up from the junior ranks to progress through to the KF3 category by 2008.

=== Formula Renault and Formula Lista Junior ===
In 2009, Piria graduated to single-seaters but had only part-time entries. She contested in Italian Formula 2000 Light and Formula Renault 2.0 championships for Tomcat Racing, having participate just six and two races, respectively. She also competed in Formula Lista Junior opening round at Dijon.

=== Formula Abarth ===
In 2010, Piria switched to the newly launched Formula Abarth series in Italy, stating with Tomcat Racing. Her best result was a finish in fourteenth place at Magione that brought her 34th place in the series standings. Piria remained in Formula Abarth for a second season in 2011, but switched to Prema Powerteam, when the series split in European and Italian series. She had five-pointscoring finishes in Italian and three European Series and finally finished fifteenth and eighteenth respectively.

=== GP3 Series ===
Piria made her debut in the GP3 Series in 2012 with Trident Racing, who took over Addax Team's entry. Piria finished the season without scoring championship points and a best finish of 12th.

=== European F3 Open ===
In 2013, Piria raced in European F3 Open with BVM Racing. She finished tenth in points.

=== Pro Mazda ===
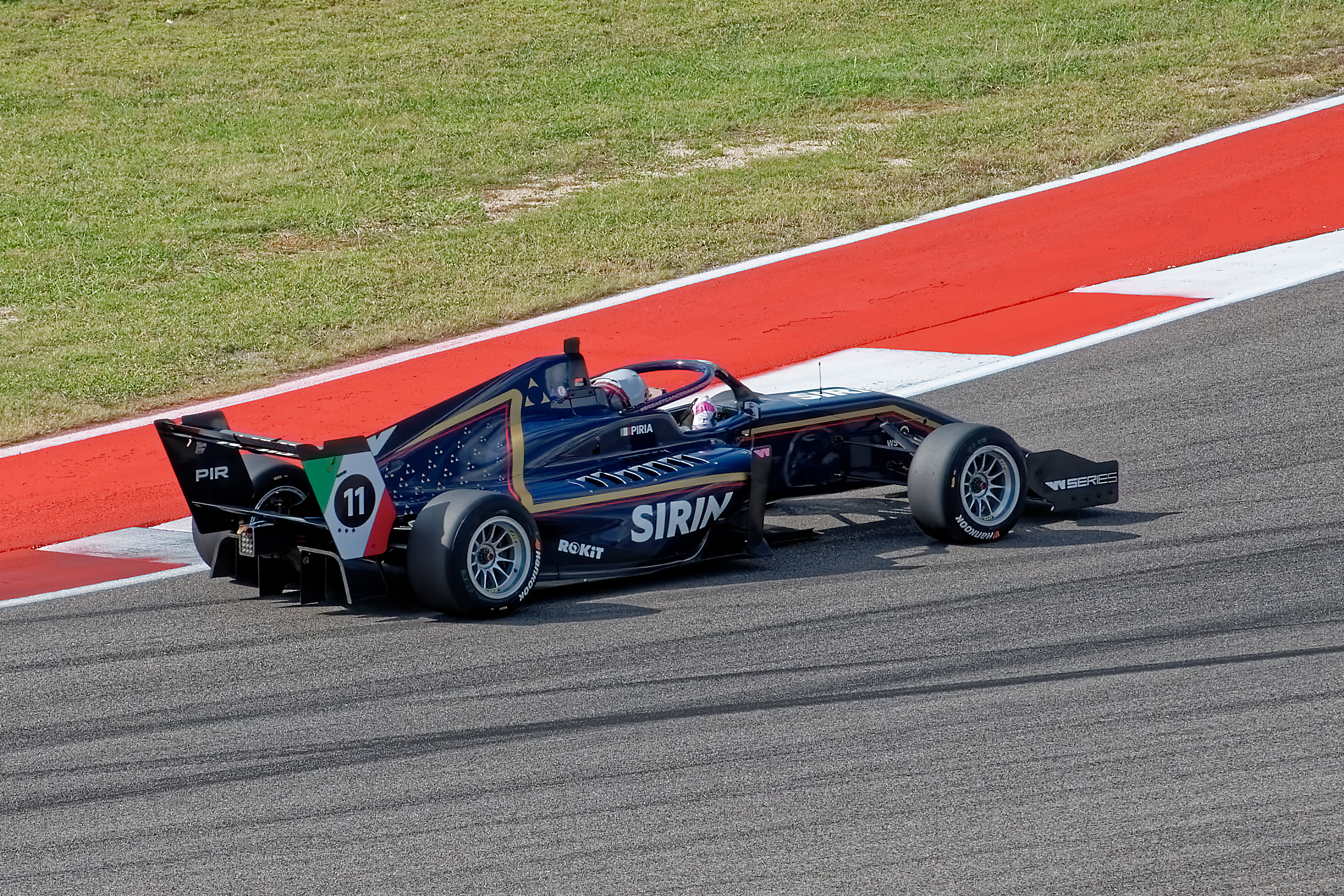
Piria competing in W Series in Austin Texas in October 2021

In 2014, Piria raced for JDC MotorSports in the Pro Mazda Championship, part of the Mazda Road to Indy. She was one of three female drivers contesting the 2014 championship.

=== W Series ===
In 2019, Piria participated in the selections for the newly created W Series. She passed the first phase and the final selection, becoming one of the eighteen drivers to compete in the six-event series, the only Italian to do so.

=== Broadcasting ===
Piria has served as a commentator on Formula E electric car racing for the television channel Mediaset. She was a presenter of the Italia 1 automotive programme Drive Up in 2021, and since 2024, she has been a presenter of Formula One races on Sky Sport, replacing Federica Masolin.

== Racing record ==
=== Career summary ===
Season	Series	Team	Races	Wins	Poles	F/Laps	Podiums	Points	Position
2009	Formula 2000 Light	Tomcat Racing	6	0	0	0	0	43	19th
2009	Formula 2000 Light Winter Trophy	Tomcat Racing	2	0	0	0	0	28	9th
2009	Italian Formula Renault Championship	Tomcat Racing	2	0	0	0	0	8	29th
2009	Formula Lista Junior	Daltec Racing	2	0	0	0	0	0	22nd
2010	Formula Abarth	Tomcat Racing	12	0	0	0	0	0	34th
2011	Formula Abarth Italian Series	Prema Powerteam	14	0	0	0	0	9	15th
2011	Formula Abarth European Series	Prema Powerteam	14	0	0	0	0	8	18th
2012	GP3 Series	Trident Racing	16	0	0	0	0	0	27th
2012–13	MRF Challenge Formula 2000	MRF Racing	4	0	0	0	0	14	14th
2013	European F3 Open	BVM Racing	16	0	0	0	0	31	10th
2014	Pro Mazda Championship	JDC MotorSports	4	0	0	0	0	17	26th
2018	Porsche Carrera Cup Italy	Dinamic Motorsport	2	0	0	0	0	0	NC
2019	W Series	Hitech GP	6	0	0	0	0	24	9th
2020	Formula Renault Eurocup	Bhaitech Racing	4	0	0	0	0	1	20th
2021	W Series	Sirin Racing	8	0	0	0	0	1	19th
2022	Italian GT Championship - GT Cup	Tsunami RT	8	0	0	0	1	42	8th
2023	Italian GT Championship - GT Cup	Enrico Fulgenzi Racing	3	2	0	0	2	55	**2nd**
2024	Swiss Porsche Sprint Challenge	Enrico Fulgenzi Racing	2	1	0	0	1	40	9th
2024	E1 Series	Team Checo	3	0	0	0	0	11	12th
2024	Italian GT Endurance Championship - GT Cup Pro-Am Division 2	EF Racing	1	1	1	0	1	33	NC
2026	Italian GT Championship Sprint Cup - GT Cup	Zanasi Racing							

* Season still in progress.

=== Complete GP3 Series results ===
(key) (Races in bold indicate pole position) (Races in italics indicate fastest lap)

Year	Entrant	1	2	3	4	5	6	7	8	9	10	11	12	13	14	15	16	D.C.	Points
2012	Trident Racing	CAT; FEA; 22	CAT; SPR; 16	MON; FEA; 19	MON; SPR; 12	VAL; FEA; 17	VAL; SPR; 18	SIL; FEA; 18	SIL; SPR; 21	HOC; FEA; 14	HOC; SPR; Ret	HUN; FEA; 20	HUN; SPR; 19	SPA; FEA; 16	SPA; SPR; 19	MNZ; FEA; 16	MNZ; SPR; Ret	26th	0

=== Complete Pro Mazda Championship results ===
Year	Team	1	2	3	4	5	6	7	8	9	10	11	12	13	14	Rank	Points
2014	JDC MotorSports	STP; 19	STP; DNS	BAR; 13	BAR; 13	IMS	IMS	LOR	HOU	HOU	MOH	MOH	MIL	SON	SON	**26th**	**17**

=== Complete W Series results ===
(key) (Races in bold indicate pole position) (Races in italics indicate fastest lap)

Year	Team	1	2	3	4	5	6	7	8	DC	Points
2019	Hitech GP	HOC; 15	ZOL; 9	MIS; 5	NOR; 12	ASS; 8	BRH; 6			9th	24
2021	Sirin Racing	RBR1; 17†	RBR2; 15	SIL; 10	HUN; 16	SPA; 12	ZAN; 11	COA1; 14	COA2; 14	19th	1

^{†} Driver did not finish the race but was classified as they completed more than 90% of the race distance.
* Season still in progress.

=== Complete Formula Renault Eurocup results ===
(key) (Races in bold indicate pole position) (Races in italics indicate fastest lap)

Year	Team	1	2	3	4	5	6	7	8	9	10	11	12	13	14	15	16	17	18	19	20	Pos	Points
2020	Bhaitech Racing	MNZ; 1	MNZ; 2	IMO; 1	IMO; 2	NÜR; 1; 17	NÜR; 2; 15	MAG; 1 Ret	MAG; 2; 10	ZAN; 1	ZAN; 2	CAT; 1	CAT; 2	SPA; 1	SPA; 2	IMO; 1	IMO; 2	HOC; 1	HOC; 2	LEC; 1	LEC; 2	20th	1
