= Caitlin Wood =

Australian racing driver

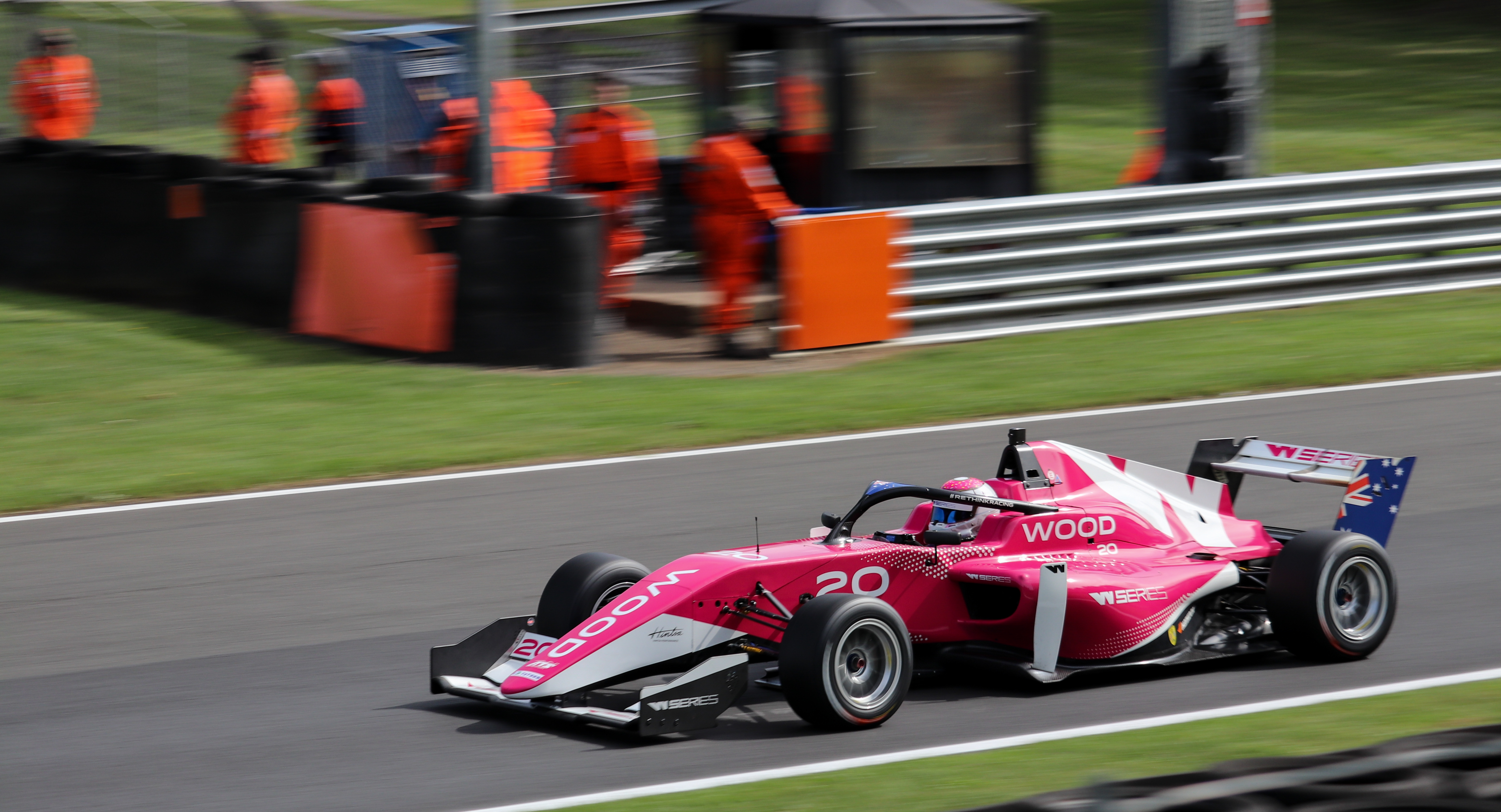
- Wood at Brands Hatch in 2019
- Nationality: (Australia) Australian
- Born: 15 January 1997 (age 29) Maitland, New South Wales

W Series
- Categorisation: FIA Silver
- Years active: 2019, 2021
- Teams: Hitech GP; Puma W Series Team; W Series Academy
- Starts: 10
- Wins: 0
- Poles: 0
- Fastest laps: 0
- Best finish: 13th in 2019

Previous series
- 2013 2014-15 2015 2016 2017 2017 2018 2019,21 2025-26: New South Wales Formula Ford; Australian Formula Ford; Formula 4 Australia; GT4 European Series; Blancpain GT Sprint Cup; Blancpain GT Endurance Cup; Lamborghini Super Trofeo Europe; W Series; Indian Racing League

Caitlin Tipping (née Wood; born 15 January 1997 in Maitland, New South Wales) is a racing driver from Australia. She last competed in the Indian Racing League, and previously competed in the W Series.

== Biography ==
Hailing from Tenambit in the New South Wales Hunter Valley, Wood began her professional motorsport career in 2013 in a state-level Formula Ford championship. She ended her debut in car racing fifth out of seven in the championship. She subsequently moved up to the inaugural Australian Formula Ford Championship in 2015. However, she struggled to 21st in the championship with only three points finishes. The Australian Formula 4 Championship would become the new national feeder series in Australia, and Wood contested a three-event part-time schedule – eventually finishing 13th in the championship before setting her sights on Europe.

Wood was accepted into Reiter Engineering's Young Stars program in early 2016, and was entered into the GT4 European Series. She finished 17th in the championship despite missing the round at Silverstone. Reiter promoted Wood to their Blancpain Sprint Series program for 2017 alongside Finnish driver Marko Helistekangas, although the duo only contested the first round before being promoted again to the Blancpain Endurance Series where they were joined by Tomáš Enge. Due to budget constraints, the team only contested the 1000km of Paul Ricard and 3 Hours of Barcelona, and failed to score any points. Wood then switched to Lamborghini Super Trofeo Europe for 2018, joining British team MTech. She contested the opening two rounds at Monza and Silverstone, before missing the next two events after she broke her ankle in training. She returned for the fifth round at the Nürburgring, scoring a best result of sixth before running out of funding; she then remained in the United Kingdom for the rest of the year working as a driver coach.

Wood applied for the W Series evaluation in 2019, and qualified as one of the seasons' eighteen permanent drivers. She scored a point with a tenth place in the season opener at the Hockenheim round, before suffering a run of misfortune in the following races; having gone off-track in a points-scoring position at Zolder, damaging her suspension in qualifying at Misano that put her at the back of the grid for the race, and a comeback drive from clutch issues at the Norisring saw her only finish 11th. Wood finished fifth place at the Assen round, scoring her best result for the series. Despite this, she missed the automatic invitation to the 2020 season by a single point after another 11th-place finish at Brands Hatch. Wood was retained as a reserve driver for the 2020 season prior to its cancellation, and made four starts in this role in 2021 – highlighted by a top-five finish in torrential rain at Spa-Francorchamps.

Wood left W Series after the 2021 season and struggled to find a seat with a lack of budget, returning to driver coaching both privately and with PalmerSport. Following a handful of Nürburgring Langstrecken-Serie appearances, she was announced as a Barbie Sports Ambassador in 2024 – a deal which only lasted a single round of the 2024 Porsche Sprint Challenge Great Britain. Wood was then hired to contest the Indian Racing League for the Bangalore Speedsters franchise alongside local driver Rishon Rajeev; a gamut of technical failures meant fifth in the first race around Chennai's Island Grounds was her best finish, but a pair of podiums for Rajeev resulted in seventh in the standings.

== Personal life ==
Wood married Matthew Tipping in 2019.

== Racing record ==
=== Karting career summary ===
Season	Series	Position
2012	Australian Rotax Nationals - Rotax Junior	30th

=== Racing career summary ===
Season	Series	Team	Races	Wins	Poles	F/laps	Podiums	Points	Position
2013	New South Wales Formula Ford Championship		9	0	0	0	0	184	5th
2014	New South Wales Formula Ford Championship	Synergy Motorsport	6	0	0	0	0	106	**3rd**
2014	Australian Formula Ford Championship	Synergy Motorsport	18	0	0	0	0	3	21st
2015	New South Wales Formula Ford Championship	Synergy Motorsport	3	0	0	0	0	60	9th
2015	Australian Formula Ford Series	Synergy Motorsport	12	0	0	0	0	61	11th
2015	Australian Formula 4 Championship	AGI Sport	3	0	0	0	0	33	13th
2015	Australian Formula 4 Championship	Dream Motorsport	6	0	0	0	0	33	13th
2016	GT4 European Series - Pro	Reiter Young Stars	9	0	0	0	0	20	17th
2017	Blancpain GT Series Sprint Cup	Reiter Young Stars	2	0	0	0	0	0	NC
2017	Blancpain GT Series Endurance Cup	Reiter Young Stars	2	0	0	0	0	0	NC
2017	24H Series - SP3-GT4	Reiter Engineering	1	0	0	0	0	0	16th
2018	Lamborghini Super Trofeo Europe - Pro-Am	MTech	4	0	0	0	0	0	NC
2019	W Series	Hitech GP	6	0	0	0	0	11	13th
2021	W Series	Puma W Series Team	2	0	0	0	0	11	16th
2021	W Series	W Series Academy	2	0	0	0	0	11	16th
2022	Nürburgring Langstrecken-Serie - VT2	Adrenalin Motorsport	2	0	0	0	0	0	NC
2024	Porsche Sprint Challenge Great Britain - Clubsport Pro	Clean Racing	3	0	0	0	3	22	4th
2024	Indian Racing League	Bangalore Speedsters	5	0	0	0	0	79‡	7th‡
2025	Indian Racing League	Speed Demons Delhi	5	0	0	0	1	87‡	**2nd**‡

* Season still in progress.
‡ Standings based on entry points, not individual drivers.

=== Bathurst 12 Hours results ===
Year	Team	Co-drivers	Car	Class	Laps	Ovr. pos.	Class pos.
2018	(Australia) M Motorsport	(Australia) David Crampton (Australia) Tim Macrow (Australia) Justin McMillan	KTM X-Bow GT4	C	31	DNF	DNF
2019	(Australia) M Motorsport	(Australia) David Crampton (Australia) Trent Harrison (Australia) Tim Macrow	KTM X-Bow GT4	C	262	DNF	DNF

=== Complete W Series results ===
(key) (Races in bold indicate pole position) (Races in italics indicate fastest lap)

Year	Team	1	2	3	4	5	6	7	8	DC	Points
2019	Hitech GP	HOC; 10	ZOL; 11	MIS; 14	NOR; 11	ASS; 5	BRH; 11			13th	11
2021	Puma W Series Team	RBR1	RBR2	SIL	HUN; 17	SPA; 5	ZAN			16th	11
2021	W Series Academy							COA1; 13	COA2; 10	16th	11

=== Complete Indian Racing League results ===
(key) (Races in bold indicate pole position) (Races in italics indicate fastest lap)

Year	Franchise	1	2	3	4	5	6	7	8	9	10	Pos.	Pts
2024	Bangalore Speedsters	IRU1; 1	IRU1; 2 Ret	IGR; 1; 5	IGR; 2	IRU2; 1; 8	IRU2; 2	KAR1; 1; 9	KAR1; 2	KAR2; 1 Ret	KAR2; 2	7th	79
2025	Speed Demons Delhi	KAR1; NC	KAR1; NC; Ret	IGR; 1	IGR; 2; 6	KAR2; 1; 5	KAR2; 2	GOA; 1; 5	GOA; 2	GOA; 3; 3		2nd	87
