= 2021 W Series =

Motor racing championship

The 2021 W Series was the second season of the W Series motor racing championship, replacing the 2020 season after it was cancelled due to the COVID-19 pandemic. The championship was exclusively open to female racing drivers as a Formula Regional-level racing series in support of the 2021 Formula One World Championship.

Jamie Chadwick entered the season as the defending W Series champion, having won the title in 2019. Chadwick secured her second consecutive championship, winning the 2021 title at the season finale race, at Circuit of the Americas.

== Calendar ==
The series management announced on 12 November 2020 that the season would consist of eight rounds all held in support of the 2021 Formula One World Championship, including two rounds scheduled for the cancelled 2020 season at the Circuit of the Americas and Autódromo Hermanos Rodríguez. A provisional calendar was then revealed on 8 December 2020. After Formula One made slight amendments to its calendar, the W Series moved its first event from Circuit Paul Ricard to the Red Bull Ring. Later on in the year, when Formula One postponed the 2021 Mexico City Grand Prix, the season finale was shifted from Mexico City to a second race in Austin.

Round	Circuit	Date	Maps
1	(Austria) Red Bull Ring, Spielberg	26 June	2021 W Series is located in Europe 2021 W Series is located in North America
2	(Austria) Red Bull Ring, Spielberg	3 July	2021 W Series is located in Europe 2021 W Series is located in North America
3	(United Kingdom) Silverstone Circuit, Silverstone	17 July	2021 W Series is located in Europe 2021 W Series is located in North America
4	(Hungary) Hungaroring, Mogyoród	31 July	2021 W Series is located in Europe 2021 W Series is located in North America
5	(Belgium) Circuit de Spa-Francorchamps, Stavelot	28 August	2021 W Series is located in Europe 2021 W Series is located in North America
6	(Netherlands) Circuit Zandvoort, Zandvoort	4 September	2021 W Series is located in Europe 2021 W Series is located in North America
7	(United States) Circuit of the Americas, Austin	23–24 October	2021 W Series is located in Europe 2021 W Series is located in North America
Cancelled due to the COVID-19 pandemic
-	(France) Circuit Paul Ricard, Le Castellet	26 June	Replaced with a second race at the Red Bull Ring
-	Autódromo Hermanos Rodríguez, Mexico City	30 October	Replaced with a second race at the Circuit of the Americas

== Entries ==
The following drivers and teams made up the grid for the 2021 W Series season. All teams used Hankook tyres, and ran two mechanically identical Tatuus F.3 T-318 cars with two drivers. All cars were operated by Fine Moments, and 'teams' were purely for sponsorship and identification purposes.

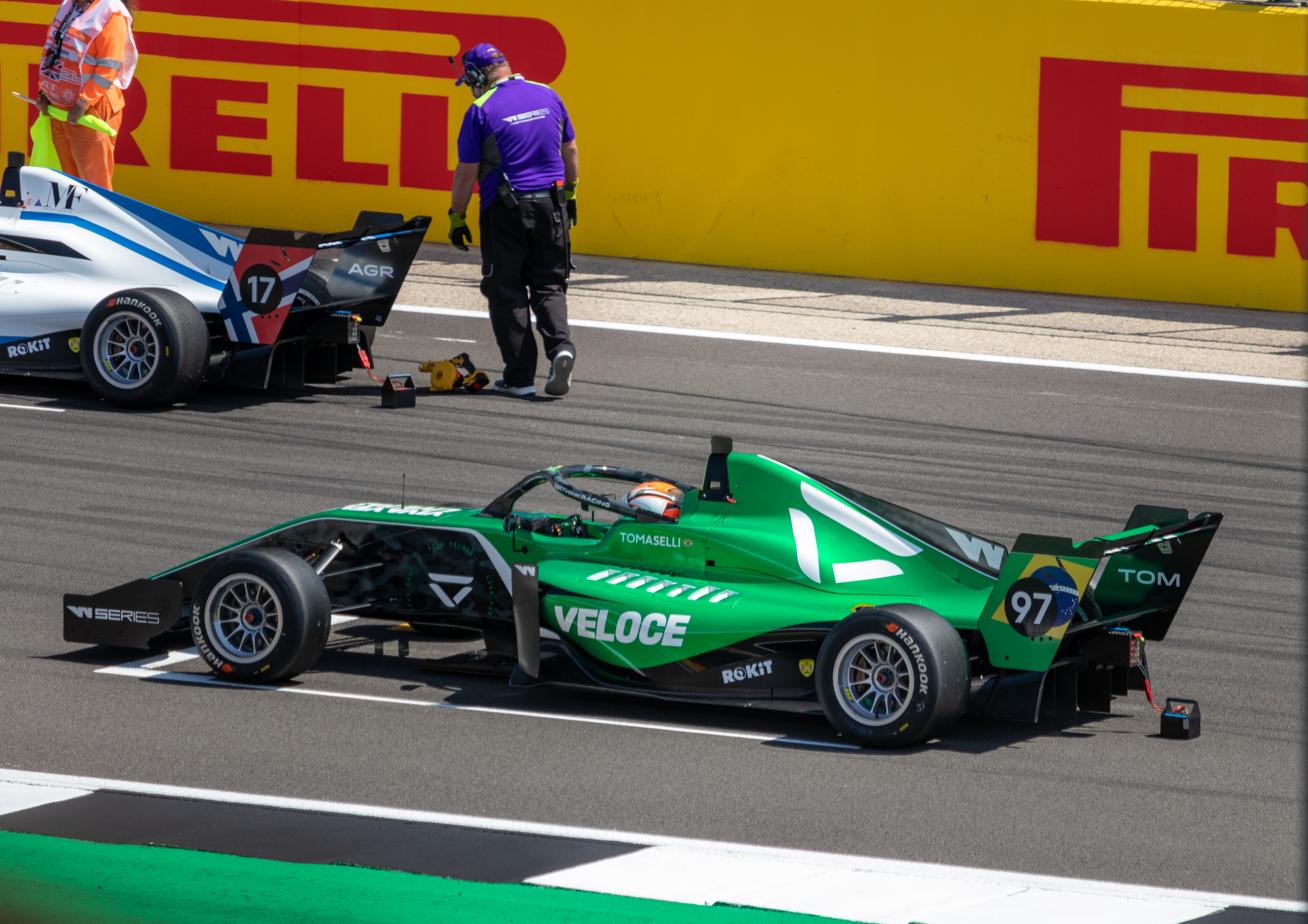
The series allowed commercial entrants for 2021, demonstrated here by Bruna Tomaselli and Veloce Racing.

Team	No.	Driver	Status	Rounds
Puma W Series Team	3	(Poland) Gosia Rdest	R	1–2
Puma W Series Team	19	(Spain) Marta García		All
Puma W Series Team	20	(Australia) Caitlin Wood	R	4–5
Puma W Series Team	49	(United Kingdom) Abbi Pulling	R	3, 6–8
W Series Academy	3	(Poland) Gosia Rdest	R	5
W Series Academy	20	(Australia) Caitlin Wood	R	7–8
W Series Academy	32	(Spain) Nerea Martí		All
W Series Academy	51	(Russia) Irina Sidorkova		1–6 (Note: Sidorkova was entered for the Spa-Francorchamps round but withdrew after testing positive for COVID-19. She was replaced by Gosia Rdest.)
Bunker Racing	5	(Switzerland) Fabienne Wohlwend (Note: Wohlwend is a Liechtenstein driver who competed under a Swiss licence.)		All
Bunker Racing	37	(United States) Sabré Cook		All
Écurie W	7	(Finland) Emma Kimiläinen		All
Écurie W	44	(United Kingdom) Abbie Eaton		All
Sirin Racing	11	(Italy) Vittoria Piria		All
Sirin Racing	54	(Japan) Miki Koyama		All
M. Forbes Motorsport	17	(Norway) Ayla Ågren		All
M. Forbes Motorsport	95	(Netherlands) Beitske Visser		All
Racing X	21	(United Kingdom) Jessica Hawkins		All
Racing X	27	(United Kingdom) Alice Powell		All
Scuderia W	22	(Spain) Belén García		All
Scuderia W	26	(United Kingdom) Sarah Moore		All
Veloce Racing	55	(United Kingdom) Jamie Chadwick		All
Veloce Racing	97	(Brazil) Bruna Tomaselli		All
Drivers contracted to the championship who did not race
	31	(South Africa) Tasmin Pepper	R	None
	99	(Rwanda) Naomi Schiff	R	None

Icon	Status
R	Reserve driver

=== Driver changes ===
The top twelve drivers from the 2019 championship were all qualified for the 2020 season, leaving eight vacancies in the driver line-up. Forty new drivers applied to take part in the season; however, only fourteen of those took part in the first test which took place between 16 and 18 September 2019 at the Circuito de Almería, Spain. The final 18 drivers were announced on 17 December 2020, with the possibility of more being announced at a later date. A list of five reserve drivers was announced on 11 June 2021, comprising 2019 drivers Gosia Rdest, Naomi Schiff and Caitlin Wood, British F4 podium finisher Abbi Pulling, and Tasmin Pepper, who was unable to take part in the season due to the COVID-19 travel restrictions.

=== Championship changes ===
Hitech GP announced on 14 November 2020 that they would discontinue their involvement for 2021 as they moved into new series, and Fine Moments took over their role for the 2021 season. The series continues to use the same Tatuus T-318 Formula 3 chassis and Alfa Romeo engines. On 24 June 2021 W Series announced it would pivot from a centrally-run series format to a team-based structure with assigned drivers and control over the car livery and team overalls, as well as the team name. The 2021 season would be used as a transitional season, with an unofficial teams' championship and all outfits still being centrally run, but with a vision for a fully team-structured grid and a legitimate teams' championship for the 2022 season. Prioritising the importance of driver skill within the championship, and to ensure technical equality, all 18 cars, although sporting a variety of liveries and team names, will remain mechanically identical, with preparation and maintenance managed by W Series Engineering. Hankook was initially dropped as the tyre supplier for the 2021 season due to the move from the Deutsche Tourenwagen Masters to F1 support bill, and W Series was reportedly "speaking to a number of tyre suppliers". On 5 May 2021, however, W Series announced Hankook would continue to supply tyres for the 2021 season.

== Season summary ==
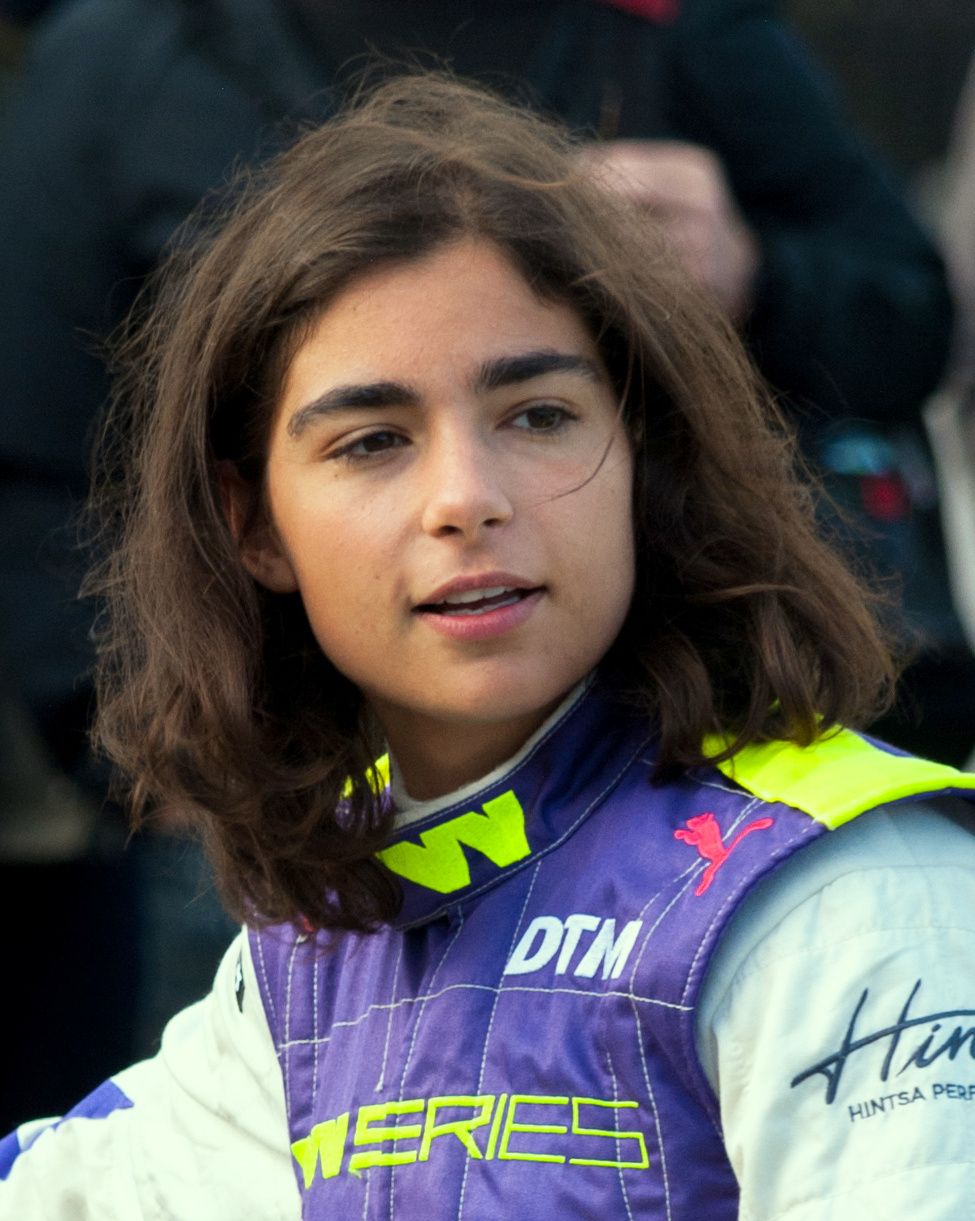
Jamie Chadwick (pictured in 2019) won back-to-back championships, winning half of the seasons' eight races.

The series' return race at the Red Bull Ring after a years' hiatus was an incident-filled affair. Having qualified outside the top five, reigning champion Jamie Chadwick was punted off the circuit on the second lap by Jessica Hawkins, but would recover to finish in the points. Débutant Belén García made a strong impression starting in the top three, but went off chasing team-mate Sarah Moore for second. Marta García broke down with a gearbox failure and the resulting safety car restart saw Beitske Visser taken out of a podium position by Emma Kimiläinen. Alice Powell remained untroubled throughout, taking a wire-to-wire win ahead of Moore and Fabienne Wohlwend, who avoided all the chaos to finish third having started ninth.

Powell and Chadwick's fortunes turned around for the second round in Austria; the reigning champion cruised to her third series victory, whilst Powell finished eighth having qualified outside the top ten. Visser started on the front row, but stalled off the line and was unable to score any points. Irina Sidorkova, the youngest driver on the grid, overtook multiple cars off the circuit at the first corner but went unpenalised, surviving a battle with Kimiläinen to finish second. Bruna Tomaselli spent most of the race in fourth with a train of cars behind her, but Moore overhauled her in the closing stages.

Powell qualified on pole for her home race at Silverstone, but was beaten off the front row by Wohlwend. The Liechtensteiner led the majority of the race until a safety car was deployed for Miki Koyama, who stopped with a race-long mechanical issue. Wohlwend ran wide on the restart lap, and was overtaken by an ultimately victorious Powell. Chadwick rounded out the podium whilst Abbi Pulling scored points in her first W Series race. Belén García was taken out of a points-paying position on the last lap by Hawkins.

Chadwick claimed a commanding win in the fourth round of the season in Budapest, beating Powell by ten seconds in a mostly uneventful race. Nerea Martí claimed her first W Series podium and moved into third in the standings having put together a consistent rookie season. Wohlwend's strong early-season form came to an abrupt end after breaking her front wing on the opening lap and becoming the only race retirement.

The series' first trip to Spa-Francorchamps was dominated by a multi-car crash in qualifying. Changeable weather resulted in unexpected damp conditions at the Radillion de l'Eau Rouge complex, resulting in a pile-up involving Moore, Abbie Eaton, Visser, Ayla Ågren, Belén García and Wohlwend – team-mates Visser and Ågren were taken to hospital for precautionary checks and neither started the race. Emma Kimiläinen overtook Powell and Chadwick in extreme wet conditions to claim her first win of the season, with Chadwick second and Marta García taking her first podium since her win at the Norisring with third.

Powell won her third race of the season at the final European round in Zandvoort, drawing her level with Chadwick at the top of the championship. Kimiläinen continued her strong run by qualifying on pole position, but was overtaken by the two Brits early in the race. A lack of overtaking due to a design flaw with the Formula Regional cars resulted in an uninspiring race, however Tomaselli did spin on the formation lap.

The series ended with a double-header at the Circuit of the Americas, and Chadwick immediately gained the upper hand by qualifying on the front row for both races whilst Powell was mired at the back of the top ten. Chadwick won the race whilst Powell kept her title hopes alive having charged to a podium finish, overtaking her protégé Pulling – who claimed a shock pole position in just her third W Series race – in the closing stages. Eaton collided with a sausage kerb and fractured her T4 vertebrae, putting her out of the last race. Marta García also sat out the final heat suffering from anxiety. In the final race, Chadwick claimed an emphatic lights-to-flag victory to seal her second title having only needed a top five finish to win the championship, with Powell unable to produce another Race 1-style fightback having been held up by Belén García. Local driver Sabré Cook, who had been uncompetitive all season having struggled with a hip injury, was taken out of a points finish by Hawkins in the final laps.

== Results and standings ==
=== Results summary ===
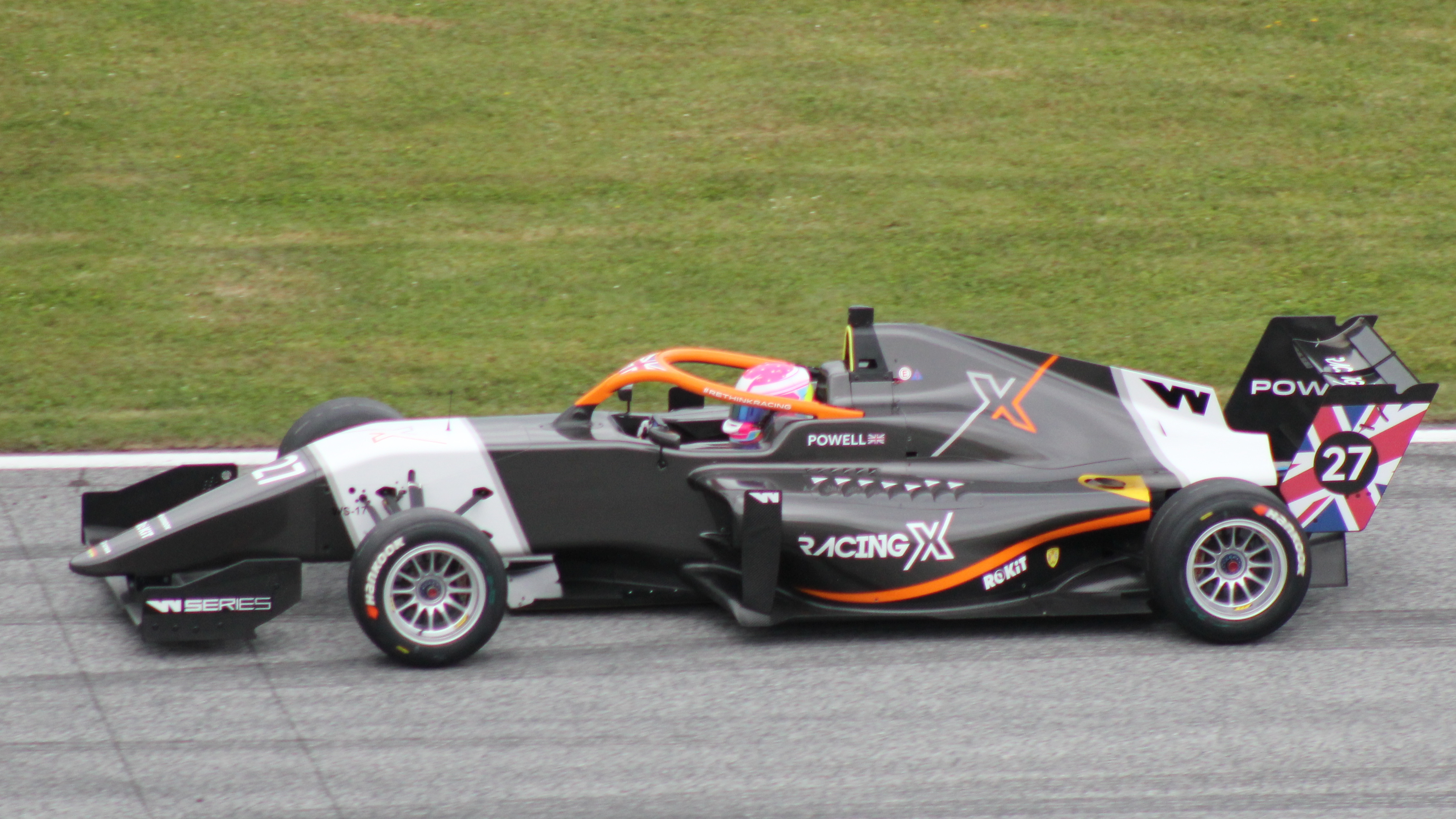
Alice Powell scored two pole positions and three race wins.

Round	Circuit	Pole position	Fastest lap	Race winner	Winning team	Report
1	Spielberg	(United Kingdom) Alice Powell	(United Kingdom) Alice Powell	(United Kingdom) Alice Powell	Racing X	report
2	Spielberg	(United Kingdom) Jamie Chadwick	(United Kingdom) Jamie Chadwick	(United Kingdom) Jamie Chadwick	Veloce Racing	report
3	Silverstone	(United Kingdom) Alice Powell	(United Kingdom) Alice Powell	(United Kingdom) Alice Powell	Racing X	report
4	Budapest	(United Kingdom) Jamie Chadwick	(United Kingdom) Jamie Chadwick	(United Kingdom) Jamie Chadwick	Veloce Racing	report
5	Spa-Francorchamps	(United Kingdom) Jamie Chadwick	(Finland) Emma Kimiläinen	(Finland) Emma Kimiläinen	Écurie W	report
6	Zandvoort	(Finland) Emma Kimiläinen	(United Kingdom) Alice Powell	(United Kingdom) Alice Powell	Racing X	report
7	Austin	(United Kingdom) Abbi Pulling	(United Kingdom) Alice Powell	(United Kingdom) Jamie Chadwick	Veloce Racing	report
7	Austin	(United Kingdom) Jamie Chadwick	(United Kingdom) Jamie Chadwick	(United Kingdom) Jamie Chadwick	Veloce Racing	report

=== Championship standings ===
==== Scoring system ====
Points were awarded to the top ten classified finishers as follows:

Race Position	**1st**	**2nd**	**3rd**	**4th**	**5th**	**6th**	**7th**	**8th**	**9th**	**10th**
Points	25	18	15	12	10	8	6	4	2	1

==== Drivers' Championship ====
Pos.	Driver	SPI1 (Austria)	SPI2 (Austria)	SIL (United Kingdom)	BUD (Hungary)	SPA (Belgium)	ZAN (Netherlands)	AUS (United States)		Points
1	(United Kingdom) Jamie Chadwick	6	**1**	3	**1**	**2**	2	1	**1**	159
2	(United Kingdom) Alice Powell	**1**	8	**1**	2	4	1	3	6	132
3	(Finland) Emma Kimiläinen	13	3	4	6	1	**3**	2	3	108
4	(Spain) Nerea Martí	7	7	5	3	8	4	8	8	61
5	(United Kingdom) Sarah Moore	2	4	7	15	13	9	7	4	56
6	(Switzerland) Fabienne Wohlwend	3	10	2	Ret	7	16	9	Ret	42
7	(United Kingdom) Abbi Pulling			8			7	**4**	2	40
8	(Netherlands) Beitske Visser	12	11	6	5	DNS	12	5	5	38
9	(Russia) Irina Sidorkova	8	2	14	4	WD	13			34
10	(Spain) Belén García	4	9	17†	8	14	8	12	7	28
11	(United Kingdom) Jessica Hawkins	16	16	16	10	6	5	6	15	27
12	(Spain) Marta García	Ret	12	12	7	3	18	15	DNS	21
13	(United Kingdom) Abbie Eaton	15	6	9	13	10	6	Ret	DNS	19
14	(Japan) Miki Koyama	5	18	Ret	12	9	10	10	12	14
15	(Brazil) Bruna Tomaselli	11	5	11	9	15	17	17	11	12
16	(Australia) Caitlin Wood				17	5		13	10	11
17	(Norway) Ayla Ågren	10	14	15	11	DNS	15	16	9	3
18	(Poland) Gosia Rdest	9	17			16				2
19	(Italy) Vicky Piria	17†	15	10	16	12	11	14	14	1
20	(United States) Sabré Cook	14	13	13	14	11	14	11	13	0
Pos.	Driver	SPI1 (Austria)	SPI2 (Austria)	SIL (United Kingdom)	BUD (Hungary)	SPA (Belgium)	ZAN (Netherlands)	AUS (United States)		Points

Colour	Result
Gold	Winner
Silver	Second place
Bronze	Third place
Green	Points classification
Blue	Non-points classification
Blue	Non-classified finish (NC)
Purple	Retired, not classified (Ret)
Red	Did not qualify (DNQ)
Red	Did not pre-qualify (DNPQ)
Black	Disqualified (DSQ)
White	Did not start (DNS)
White	Withdrew (WD)
White	Race cancelled (C)
Blank	Did not practice (DNP)
Blank	Did not arrive (DNA)
Blank	Excluded (EX)

**Bold** – Pole
Italics – Fastest Lap
† — Did not finish, but classified
