= 2021 Budapest W Series round =

2021 W Series Budapest round
- Event 4 of 7 of the 2021 W Series

Race details
- Date: 31 July 2021
- Official name: 2021 W Series Budapest round
- Location: Hungaroring, Mogyoród, Pest County, Budapest
- Course: Permanent circuit
- Course length: 4.381 km (2.722 miles)
- Distance: 19 laps, 83.239 km (51.718 miles)

Pole position
Driver	(United Kingdom) Jamie Chadwick	Veloce Racing
- Time: 1:42.735

Fastest lap
Driver	(United Kingdom) Jamie Chadwick	Veloce Racing
- Time: 1:43.611

Podium
First	(United Kingdom) Jamie Chadwick	Veloce Racing
Second	(United Kingdom) Alice Powell	Racing X
Third	(Spain) Nerea Martí	W Series Academy

The 2021 W Series Budapest round was the fourth round of seven in the 2021 W Series, and took place at the Hungaroring in Budapest on 31 July 2021. The event was an undercard to the 2021 Formula One World Championship round at the same circuit.

== Report ==
=== Background ===
Caitlin Wood replaced Abbi Pulling in the Puma W Series Team.

Alice Powell led the championship on 54 points, 6 points ahead of Jamie Chadwick.

=== Race ===
Chadwick stormed away from pole position to take a commanding lead into the first corner, while Irina Sidorkova hung around the outside of Beitske Visser to take fourth. Further back, Ayla Ågren and Fabienne Wohlwend ran wide – the Norwegian slowed suddenly and caused Wohlwend to hit the back of her car, launch into the air and broke her front wing in the process, requiring a pit-stop.

Chadwick and Powell began to sprint away from Nerea Martí in third by around a second a lap, as Sidorkova and Visser began battling over fourth. Other battles in the field included Marta García and Emma Kimiläinen for sixth, as well as Belén García and a slow-starting Bruna Tomaselli for eighth. Sabré Cook meanwhile had made up five places from the start but began to fall back through the field as Miki Koyama overtook her for 13th, not helped by her side mirrors bending from an impact with a kerb. A bad day was made worse for the Bunker team when Wohlwend, who was suffering from further damage after the first lap incident, went a lap down after her pit-stop and then chose to retire the car after half-distance.

Marta García had begun to pull away from Kimiläinen but a mistake from the Spaniard saw her run wide at turn 11, allowing the Écurie W driver to draw alongside and overtake into turn 13. Another driver making moves was Koyama, who closed on the back of Abbie Eaton quicker than she was expecting – light front to rear contact was made at turn 2, before the Japanese driver also braved it around the outside of turn 3 to pass The Grand Tour test driver for 12th.

Chadwick eased to victory with a ten-second gap to title rival Powell in second. Martí scored her first podium and the second for the Academy team, team-mate Sidorkova holding out Visser and coming in 5 seconds behind Martí. Series returnee Caitlin Wood started and finished 17th after some mechanical issues on the rear end of her car led to misaligned tracking.

== Classification ==
=== Practice ===
Session	No.	Driver	Team	Time	Source
Practice 1	55	(United Kingdom) Jamie Chadwick	Veloce Racing	1:43.317	

=== Qualifying ===
Pos.	No.	Driver	Team	Time/Gap
1	55	(United Kingdom) Jamie Chadwick	Veloce Racing	1:42.735
2	27	(United Kingdom) Alice Powell	Racing X	+0.269
3	32	(Spain) Nerea Martí	W Series Academy	+0.307
4	95	(Netherlands) Beitske Visser	M. Forbes Motorsport	+0.445
5	51	(Russia) Irina Sidorkova	W Series Academy	+0.644
6	97	(Brazil) Bruna Tomaselli	Veloce Racing	+0.875
7	19	(Spain) Marta García	Puma W Series Team	+1.055
8	7	(Finland) Emma Kimiläinen	Écurie W	+1.129
9	22	(Spain) Belén García	Scuderia W	+1.163
10	21	(United Kingdom) Jessica Hawkins	Racing X	+1.173
11	11	(Italy) Vittoria Piria	Sirin Racing	+1.474
12	17	(Norway) Ayla Ågren	M. Forbes Motorsport	+1.573
13	5	(Liechtenstein) Fabienne Wohlwend (Note: Wohlwend races with a Swiss licence however is a Liechtenstein citizen and passport holder.)	Bunker Racing	+1.607
14	44	(United Kingdom) Abbie Eaton	Écurie W	+1.846
15	54	(Japan) Miki Koyama	Sirin Racing	+2.101
16	26	(United Kingdom) Sarah Moore	Scuderia W	+2.134
17	20	(Australia) Caitlin Wood	Puma W Series Team	+2.336
18	37	(United States) Sabré Cook	Bunker Racing	+2.687

=== Race ===
Pos.	No.	Driver	Team	Laps	Time/Retired	Grid	Pts
1	55	(United Kingdom) Jamie Chadwick	Veloce Racing	19	32:59.370	1	25
2	27	(United Kingdom) Alice Powell	Racing X	19	+10.237	2	18
3	32	(Spain) Nerea Martí	W Series Academy	19	+15.395	3	15
4	51	(Russia) Irina Sidorkova	W Series Academy	19	+20.931	5	12
5	95	(Netherlands) Beitske Visser	M. Forbes Motorsport	19	+21.618	4	10
6	7	(Finland) Emma Kimiläinen	Écurie W	19	+26.423	8	8
7	19	(Spain) Marta García	Puma W Series Team	19	+28.706	7	6
8	22	(Spain) Belén García	Scuderia W	19	+30.790	9	4
9	97	(Brazil) Bruna Tomaselli	Veloce Racing	19	+31.172	6	2
10	21	(United Kingdom) Jessica Hawkins	Racing X	19	+37.368	10	1
11	17	(Norway) Ayla Ågren	M. Forbes Motorsport	19	+38.356	12	
12	54	(Japan) Miki Koyama	Sirin Racing	19	+42.047	15	
13	44	(United Kingdom) Abbie Eaton	Écurie W	19	+47.892	14	
14	37	(United States) Sabré Cook	Bunker Racing	19	+48.615	18	
15	26	(United Kingdom) Sarah Moore	Scuderia W	19	+49.265	16	
16	11	(Italy) Vittoria Piria	Sirin Racing	19	+50.722	11	
17	20	(Australia) Caitlin Wood	Puma W Series Team	19	+51.506	17	
DNF	5	(Liechtenstein) Fabienne Wohlwend	Bunker Racing	9	Collision damage	13	
Fastest lap set by Jamie Chadwick: 1:43.611

== Championship standings ==
Pos.	Driver	Pts	Gap
1	(United Kingdom) Jamie Chadwick	73	
2	(United Kingdom) Alice Powell	72	-1
3	(Spain) Nerea Martí	37	-36
4	(United Kingdom) Sarah Moore	36	-37
5	(Finland) Emma Kimiläinen	35	-38

== See also ==
- 2021 Hungarian Grand Prix

== Notes ==
Previous race: 2021 W Series Silverstone round	W Series; 2021 season	Next race: 2021 W Series Spa-Francorchamps round
