= 2021 1st Spielberg W Series round =

2021 W Series Spielberg round
- Event 1 of 7 of the 2021 W Series

Race details
- Date: 26 June 2021
- Official name: 2021 W Series Spielberg round
- Location: Red Bull Ring, Spielberg, Styria, Austria
- Course: Permanent circuit
- Course length: 4.318 km (2.683 miles)
- Distance: 20 laps, 86.360 km (53.660 miles)

Pole position
Driver	(United Kingdom) Alice Powell	Racing X
- Time: 1:28.964

Fastest lap
Driver	(United Kingdom) Alice Powell	Racing X
- Time: 1:29.957

Podium
First	(United Kingdom) Alice Powell	Racing X
Second	(United Kingdom) Sarah Moore	Scuderia W
Third	(Liechtenstein) Fabienne Wohlwend (Note: Wohlwend races with a Swiss licence however is a Liechtenstein citizen and passport holder.)	Bunker Racing

The 2021 W Series Spielberg round was the first round of seven in the 2021 W Series, and took place at the Red Bull Ring in Austria on 26 June 2021. The event was an undercard to the 2021 Formula One World Championship round at the same circuit.

== Report ==
=== Background ===
Six new drivers entered the championship having successfully applied for entry into the cancelled 2020 season – Ayla Ågren, Abbie Eaton, Belén García, Nerea Martí, Irina Sidorkova and Bruna Tomaselli. All drivers that finished outside the top 14 in the 2019 season left the championship, with 11 of the top 12 automatically qualifying as full-time entries for 2021. South African driver Tasmin Pepper, who finished 10th in the 2019 championship, was retained as a reserve driver due to complications with her visa given the nature of the COVID-19 pandemic in South Africa – as were Caitlin Wood and Gosia Rdest, who finished 13th and 14th in the 2019 series respectively, and Abbi Pulling, a British F4 driver who did not go through any evaluation process. Naomi Schiff, who raced in 2019, was named as a reserve driver but was maintained largely in a media role.

The championship employed a team system for 2021; all cars were still operated by one outfit – Double R Racing operating as Fine Moments in 2021 as opposed to Hitech Grand Prix in 2019 – but the drivers were split into 2-car teams for marketing and sponsorship purposes. Veloce, Puma, Forbes, Sirin and The Bunker bought into the program, and the remaining four teams were W Series themed – Écurie W, Scuderia W, Racing X and the W Series Academy; the latter for the series' youngest drivers and offering them a two-year scholarship. The Puma team chose to rotate their second seat between the series' reserve drivers, with Gosia Rdest driving in the first two rounds.

=== Race ===
Alice Powell led the field away from pole position. Rookie Belén García went around the outside of 2019 runner-up Beitske Visser at turn 3 on the opening lap and put herself up into the podium places. At the back of the field, unseen by TV cameras, Sabré Cook was involved in a minor collision at the first-corner and injured her hip in the process. Reigning champion Jamie Chadwick started in a lowly 8th, but fought her way into the top 5 by the end of the first lap – only to be collected by Powell's team-mate Jessica Hawkins at turn 1 and half-spun, dropping her to 16th. Scuderia W team-mates Sarah Moore and Belén García then began to fight over second place as Powell skipped away, with García proving her inexperience having first run wide at turn 3 and then having a much larger off at turn 6, rejoining behind Miki Koyama in 9th. Koyama was embroiled in a battle with Marta García and Bruna Tomaselli, however the older García's race was curtailed with 10 minutes remaining after mechanical problems - her stranded Puma entry bringing out the safety car.

Chadwick had failed to make progress through the field after the incident with Hawkins, but a four-minute dash to the flag proved critical. Visser and Emma Kimiläinen, who had inherited the battle for 3rd after Belén García's off, collided at turn 3 – resulting in a broken front wing for the Finn and no points for Visser. In attempting to avoid the incident, Tomaselli slowed down and was spun by Vittoria Piria, also dropping to the back. Kimiläinen did not pit to fix her wing, resulting in a squabble at the back of the top ten – in which Piria collided with Abbie Eaton at the same turn a lap later and the damage to the Italian's car proved terminal. Kimiläinen's wing came off the car as she began the final lap, and nearly flew into the path of Cook.

Powell led the race from start to finish and claimed back-to-back victories after her win in the last round of the 2019 season at Brands Hatch. Moore remained a comfortable second and Fabienne Wohlwend avoided all the incidents to finish 3rd having started 9th, however only narrowly beat a recovering Belén García to the line. Chadwick meanwhile made up nine spots in the late-race drama to finish in 6th, her worst finish in a points-paying W Series race. Jessica Hawkins had finished in 5th on the road, but was demoted to 16th and the last classified finisher after her incident with Chadwick earned her a 30-second penalty.

== Classification ==
=== Practice ===
Session	No.	Driver	Team	Time	Source
Practice 1	27	(United Kingdom) Alice Powell	Racing X	1:29.278	

=== Qualifying ===
Pos.	No.	Driver	Team	Time/Gap
1	27	(United Kingdom) Alice Powell	Racing X	1:28.964
2	26	(United Kingdom) Sarah Moore	Scuderia W	+0.177
3	22	(Spain) Belén García	Scuderia W	+0.207
4	95	(Netherlands) Beitske Visser	M. Forbes Motorsport	+0.248
5	7	(Finland) Emma Kimiläinen	Écurie W	+0.341
6	21	(United Kingdom) Jessica Hawkins	Racing X	+0.345
7	19	(Spain) Marta García	Puma W Series Team	+0.365
8	55	(United Kingdom) Jamie Chadwick	Veloce Racing	+0.369
9	5	(Liechtenstein) Fabienne Wohlwend	Bunker Racing	+0.464
10	17	(Norway) Ayla Ågren	M. Forbes Motorsport	+0.495
11	97	(Brazil) Bruna Tomaselli	Veloce Racing	+0.553
12	44	(United Kingdom) Abbie Eaton	Écurie W	+0.638
13	54	(Japan) Miki Koyama	Sirin Racing	+0.652
14	51	(Russia) Irina Sidorkova	W Series Academy	+0.710
15	11	(Italy) Vittoria Piria	Sirin Racing	+0.715
16	32	(Spain) Nerea Martí	W Series Academy	+0.747
17	37	(United States) Sabré Cook	Bunker Racing	+1.068
18	3	(Poland) Gosia Rdest	Puma W Series Team	+1.373

=== Race ===
Pos.	No.	Driver	Team	Laps	Time/Retired	Grid	Pts
1	27	(United Kingdom) Alice Powell	Racing X	20	32:07.801	1	25
2	26	(United Kingdom) Sarah Moore	Scuderia W	20	+0.743	2	18
3	5	(Liechtenstein) Fabienne Wohlwend	Bunker Racing	20	+6.609	9	15
4	22	(Spain) Belén García	Scuderia W	20	+7.224	3	12
5	54	(Japan) Miki Koyama	Sirin Racing	20	+10.707	13	10
6	55	(United Kingdom) Jamie Chadwick	Veloce Racing	20	+11.265	8	8
7	32	(Spain) Nerea Martí	W Series Academy	20	+11.666	16	6
8	51	(Russia) Irina Sidorkova	W Series Academy	20	+12.159	14	4
9	3	(Poland) Gosia Rdest	Puma W Series Team	20	+13.727	18	2
10	17	(Norway) Ayla Ågren	M. Forbes Motorsport	20	+15.352	10	1
11	97	(Brazil) Bruna Tomaselli	Veloce Racing	20	+16.685	11	
12	95	(Netherlands) Beitske Visser	M. Forbes Motorsport	20	+18.429	4	
13	7	(Finland) Emma Kimiläinen	Écurie W	20	+18.817	5	
14	37	(United States) Sabré Cook	Bunker Racing	20	+19.198	17	
15	44	(United Kingdom) Abbie Eaton	Écurie W	20	+27.915	12	
16	21	(United Kingdom) Jessica Hawkins	Racing X	20	+40.387^{1}	6	
DNF	11	(Italy) Vittoria Piria	Sirin Racing	17	Collision	15	
DNF	19	(Spain) Marta García	Puma W Series Team	12	Mechanical	7	
Fastest lap set by Alice Powell: 1:29.957

- ^1 – Hawkins was given a 30-second post-race time penalty for causing a collision.

== Championship standings ==
Pos.	Driver	Pts	Gap
1	(United Kingdom) Alice Powell	25	
2	(United Kingdom) Sarah Moore	18	-7
3	(Liechtenstein) Fabienne Wohlwend	15	-10
4	(Spain) Belén García	12	-13
5	(Japan) Miki Koyama	10	-15

== See also ==
- 2021 Styrian Grand Prix

== Notes ==
Previous race: 2019 W Series Brands Hatch round	W Series; 2021 season	Next race: 2021 W Series Spielberg round 2
