= Sabré Cook =

American racing driver and mechanical engineer (born 1994)

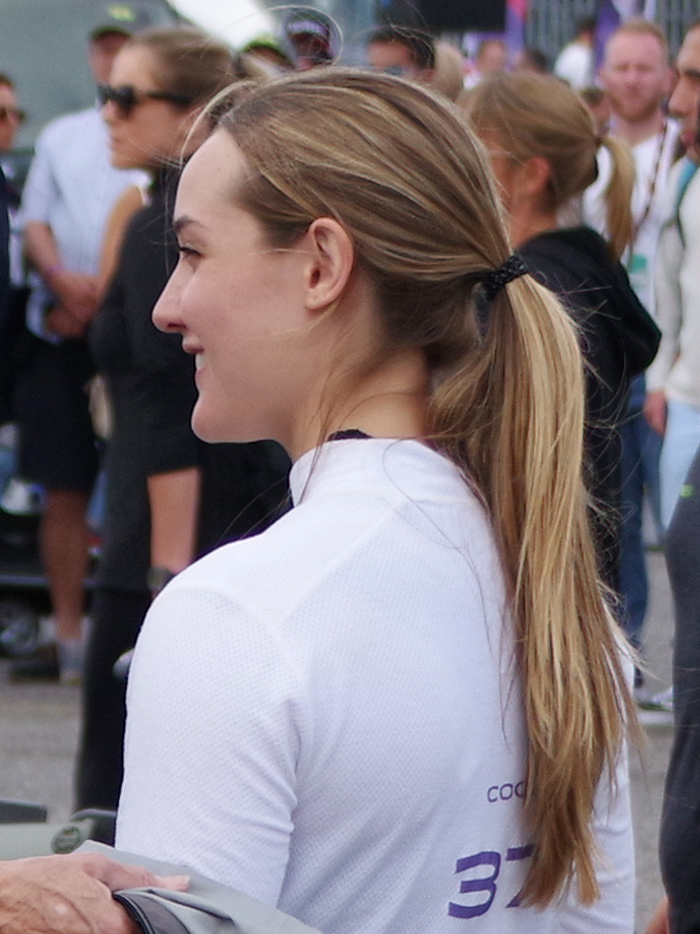
- Sabré Cook at 2019 Brands Hatch W Series round
- Nationality: (United States) American
- Born: Sabré Leigh Cook; May 21, 1994 (age 32) Grand Junction, Colorado, U.S.

Porsche Carrera Cup North America
- Years active: 2023–2025
- Teams: Kelly-Moss Race Team (2023); MDK Motorsports (2024); Era Motorsport (2024); JDX Racing (2025)
- Starts: 48
- Best finish: 7th in 2025 (Circuit of the Americas)

Previous series
- 2021 2021, 2019 2020, 2017 2020 2018 2018: Mazda MX-5 Cup; W Series; SCCA National Championship Runoffs; Indy Pro 2000 Championship; U.S. F2000 National Championship; Formula 4 United States

Sabré Leigh Cook (born May 21, 1994) is an American female racing driver and mechanical engineer. She is currently competing in the Porsche Carrera Cup North America series.

== Career ==
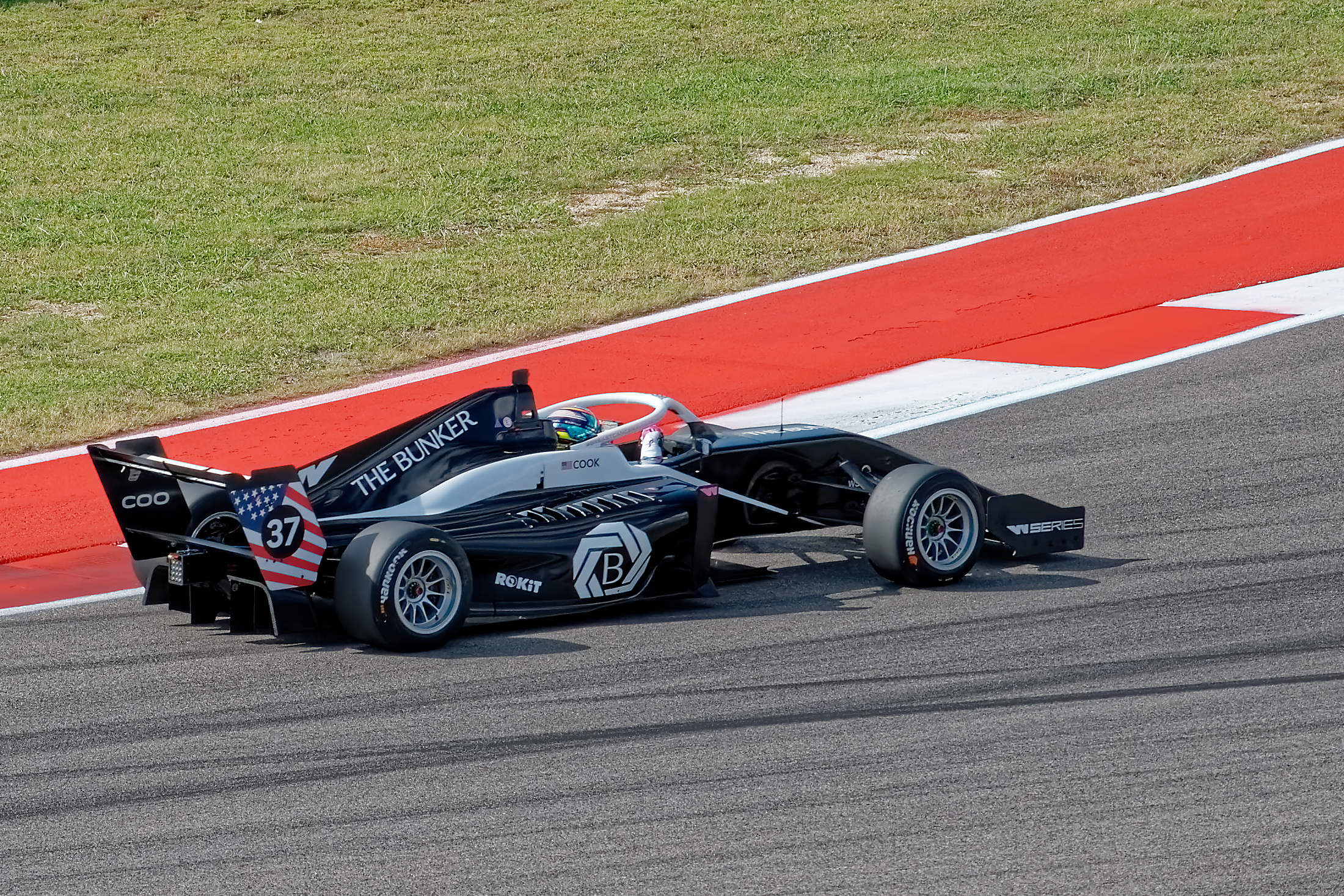
Cook competing in the 2021 W Series Austin round.

Cook started her professional motorsport career with an invitation into the 2017 SCCA National Championship Runoffs event at Indianapolis Motor Speedway, finishing ninth in the Formula Enterprise class. She would step up to American entry level formula in 2018, running partial campaigns in both U.S.F2000 and Formula 4. Her best results would be a 14th in USF2000 (at Indianapolis) and a 15th in USF4 (at the Circuit of the Americas), however she would only be classified in the former championship standings as points are only awarded to the top-ten in F4.

Cook would qualify as one of the 18 permanent drivers for the 2019 W Series, a Formula Regional championship for women. Cook would have an anonymous debut with 13th at the Hockenheimring, but pushed Vivien Keszthelyi out of the race in Zolder which resulted in a drive-through penalty. A race-long battle with Sarah Moore saw her first points at Misano World Circuit Marco Simoncelli, and backed it up with a seventh-place finish in Nuremberg. Two more points in the final round at Brands Hatch saw her take 12th in the championship and the final automatic qualification place for the 2020 championship, but the season was cancelled with the onset of the COVID-19 pandemic. In response, she returned to US-based competition and the Indy Pro 2000 Championship, but ran out of funding after just two rounds.

Cook returned to the W Series in 2021, driving for the Bunker car club entrant. In the first race at the Red Bull Ring, she was involved in an unseen first-corner collision that resulted in a hip injury – an injury that went untreated for the remainder of the season. The American failed to score any points that season, the only driver to do so, but had been running in a points-paying position in the final race at the Circuit of the Americas before being spun by Jessica Hawkins.

Ahead of the 2023 season, following eighteen months of rehabilitation for her hip injury, Cook was named as the first member of the Porsche Deluxe Female Driver Development Program, granting her 2023 Porsche Carrera Cup North America entry fee aid as well as mentoring sessions with former Porsche factory driver Patrick Long. At the sixth round of the season at Indianapolis, driving for KellyMoss, Cook suffered a concussion in a crash and was forced to sit out the remainder of the season having earned a best finish of sixth in Miami. Cook returned to the series with MDK Motorsports for 2024. In 2025, she joined forces with JDX Racing to compete a full-season campaign, where she earned her highest finish in the series of seventh.

== Personal life ==
Outside of driving, Cook also holds a Bachelors of Science in Mechanical Engineering from the Colorado School of Mines. She was the 2018 US Global final winner of the Infiniti Engineering Academy – an engineering program for international university students to compete and qualify for positions within Infiniti Global and Renault F1 Team. Cook is engaged to French musician Alex Vedie.

== Racing record ==
=== Career summary ===
Season	Series	Team	Races	Wins	Poles	F/Laps	Podiums	Points	Position
2017	SCCA National Championship Runoffs	Alliance Autosport	1	0	0	0	0	N/A	9th
2018	Formula 4 United States Championship	Velocity Racing Development	5	0	0	0	0	0	39th
2018	U.S. F2000 National Championship	Team Benik	9	0	0	0	0	27	30th
2019	W Series	Hitech GP	6	0	0	0	0	12	12th
2020	Indy Pro 2000 Championship	BN Racing with Team Benik	5	0	0	0	0	47	19th
2020	SCCA National Championship Runoffs	Apple Motorsports	1	0	0	0	0	N/A	8th
2021	W Series	Bunker Racing	8	0	0	0	0	0	20th
2021	Mazda MX-5 Cup	Hixon Motorsports	2	0	0	0	0	370	31st
2023	Porsche Carrera Cup North America	Kelly-Moss Road and Race	12	0	0	0	0	34	16th
2024	Porsche Carrera Cup North America	MDK Motorsports	8	0	0	0	0	63	12th
2024	Porsche Carrera Cup North America	Era Motorsport	7	0	0	0	0	63	12th
2025	Porsche Carrera Cup North America	JDX Racing	16	0	0	0	0	69	12th
2026	Porsche Carrera Cup North America	JDX Racing	16	0	0	0	0	85	9th

* Season still in progress.

=== SCCA National Championship Runoffs ===
Year	Track	Car	Engine	Class	Finish	Start	Status
2017	Indianapolis Motor Speedway	Van Diemen–Mazda DP06	Mazda	Formula Enterprise	9	9	Running
2017	Indianapolis Motor Speedway	Spec Racer Ford Gen3	Ford	Spec Racer Ford Gen3	52	69	Running
2020	Road America	Van Diemen–Mazda DP06	Mazda	Formula Enterprise 2	8	11	Running

=== American open-wheel racing results ===
==== U.S. F2000 Championship ====
Year	Team	1	2	3	4	5	6	7	8	9	10	11	12	13	14	Rank	Points
2018	Team Benik	STP; 15	STP; 17	IMS; 21	IMS; 14	LOR	ROA; 25	ROA; 25	TOR	TOR	MOH; 16	MOH; 22	MOH; 20	POR	POR	30th	27

==== Indy Pro 2000 Championship ====
Year	Team	1	2	3	4	5	6	7	8	9	10	11	12	13	14	15	Rank	Points
2020	BN Racing w/ Team Benik	ROA; 10	ROA; 10	MOH; 11	MOH; 12	MOH; 15	LOR	GMP	IMS	IMS	IMS	NJM	NJM	NJM	STP	STP	19th	47

=== Complete Formula 4 United States Championship results ===
(key) (Races in bold indicate pole position) (Races in italics indicate fastest lap)

Year	Entrant	1	2	3	4	5	6	7	8	9	10	11	12	13	14	15	16	17	DC	Points
2018	Velocity Racing Development	VIR; 1	VIR; 2	VIR; 3	ROA; 1	ROA; 2	ROA; 3	MOH; 1	MOH; 2	MOH; 3	PIT; 1	PIT; 2	PIT; 3	NJMP; 1; 25	NJMP; 2; 16	NJMP; 3; 16	COTA; 1; 19	COTA; 2; 15	39th	0

=== Complete W Series results ===
(key) (Races in bold indicate pole position) (Races in italics indicate fastest lap)

Year	Team	1	2	3	4	5	6	7	8	DC	Points
2019	Hitech GP	HOC; 13	ZOL; 15	MIS; 8	NOR; 7	ASS; 13	BRH; 9			12th	12
2021	Bunker Racing	RBR1; 14	RBR2; 13	SIL; 13	HUN; 14	SPA; 11	ZAN; 14	COA1; 11	COA2; 13	20th	0

* Season still in progress.
