= Irina Sidorkova =

Russian racing driver

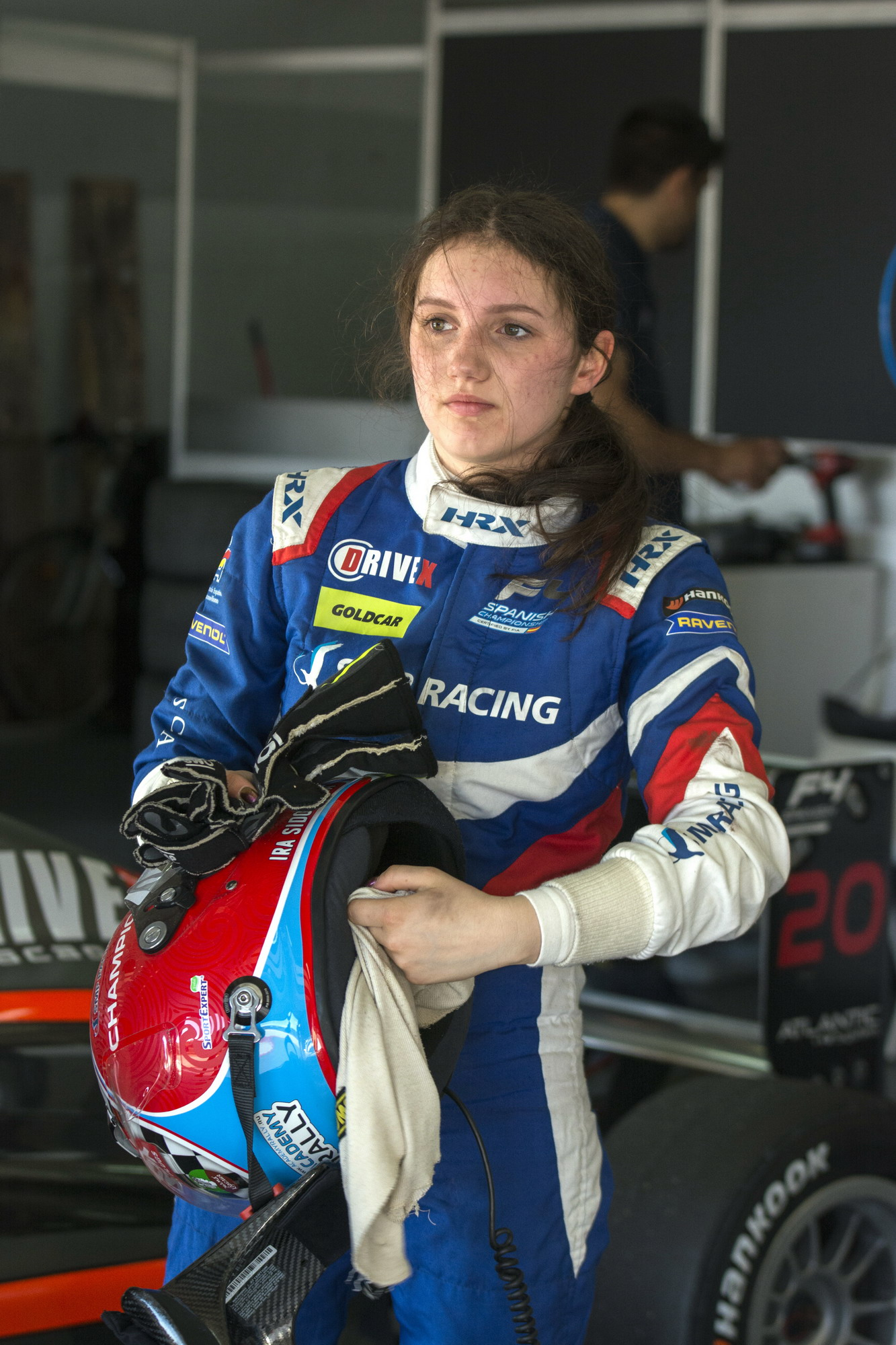
- Sidorkova in 2019
- Nationality: Russian
- Born: Irina Antonovna Sidorkova; 27 June 2003 (age 23) Petrozavodsk, Karelia, Russian Federation

W Series career
- Debut season: 2021
- Current team: W Series Academy
- Car number: 51
- Starts: 5 (6 entries)
- Wins: 0
- Podiums: 1
- Poles: 0
- Fastest laps: 0
- Best finish: 9th in 2021

Previous series
- 2021 2017–18, 2020 2019 2018–19: F3 Asian Championship; Russian Circuit Racing Series; F4 Spanish Championship; SMP F4 Championship

Championship titles
- 2018: RCRS – National Junior

Irina Antonovna Sidorkova (Russian: Ирина Антоновна Сидоркова; born 27 June 2003) is a racing driver from Russia who currently competes in the Russian Circuit Racing Series. She previously competed in the W Series and the F3 Asian Championship.

== Biography ==
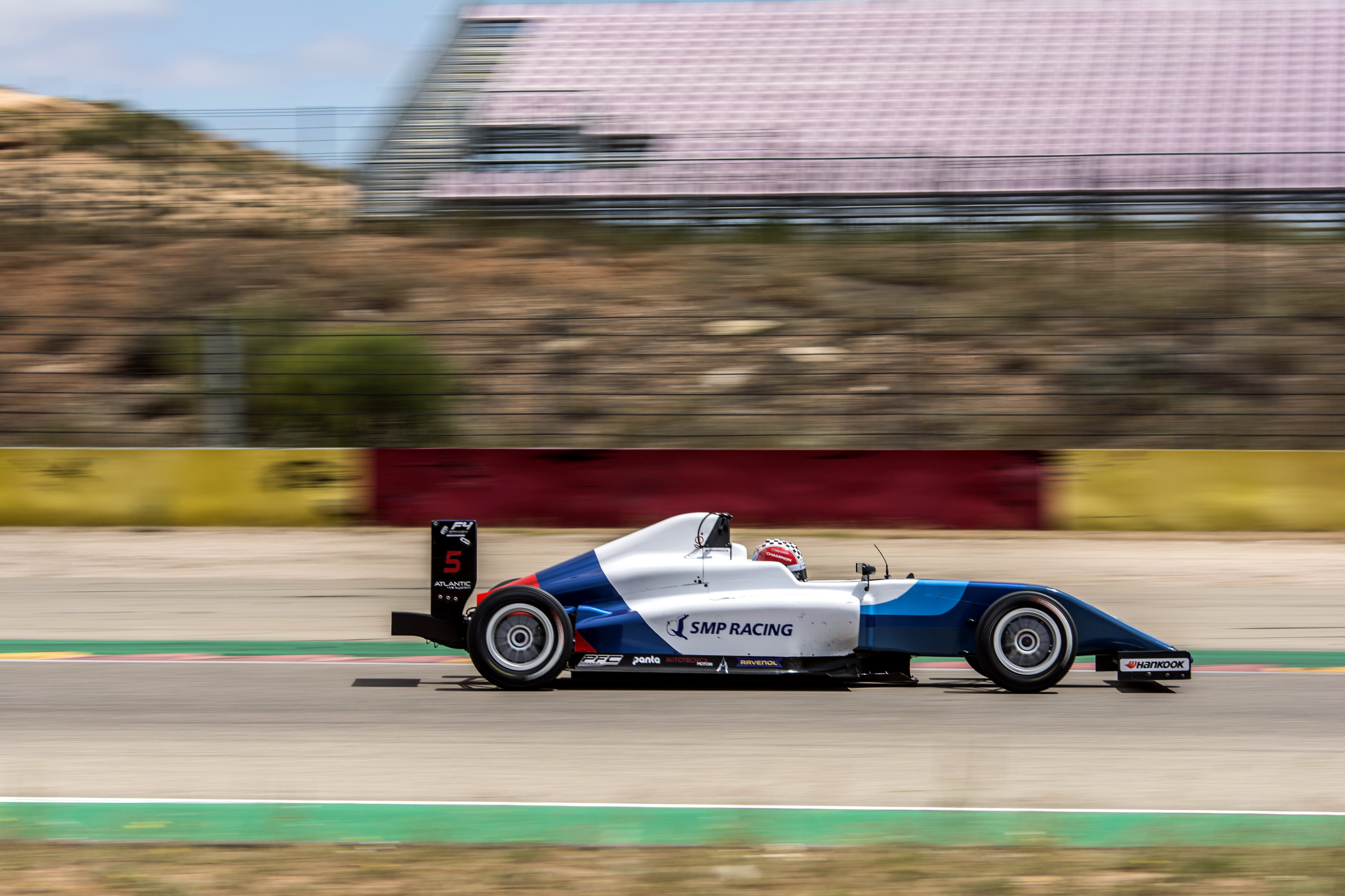
Sidorkova contesting Spanish F4 at Motorland Aragón in 2019

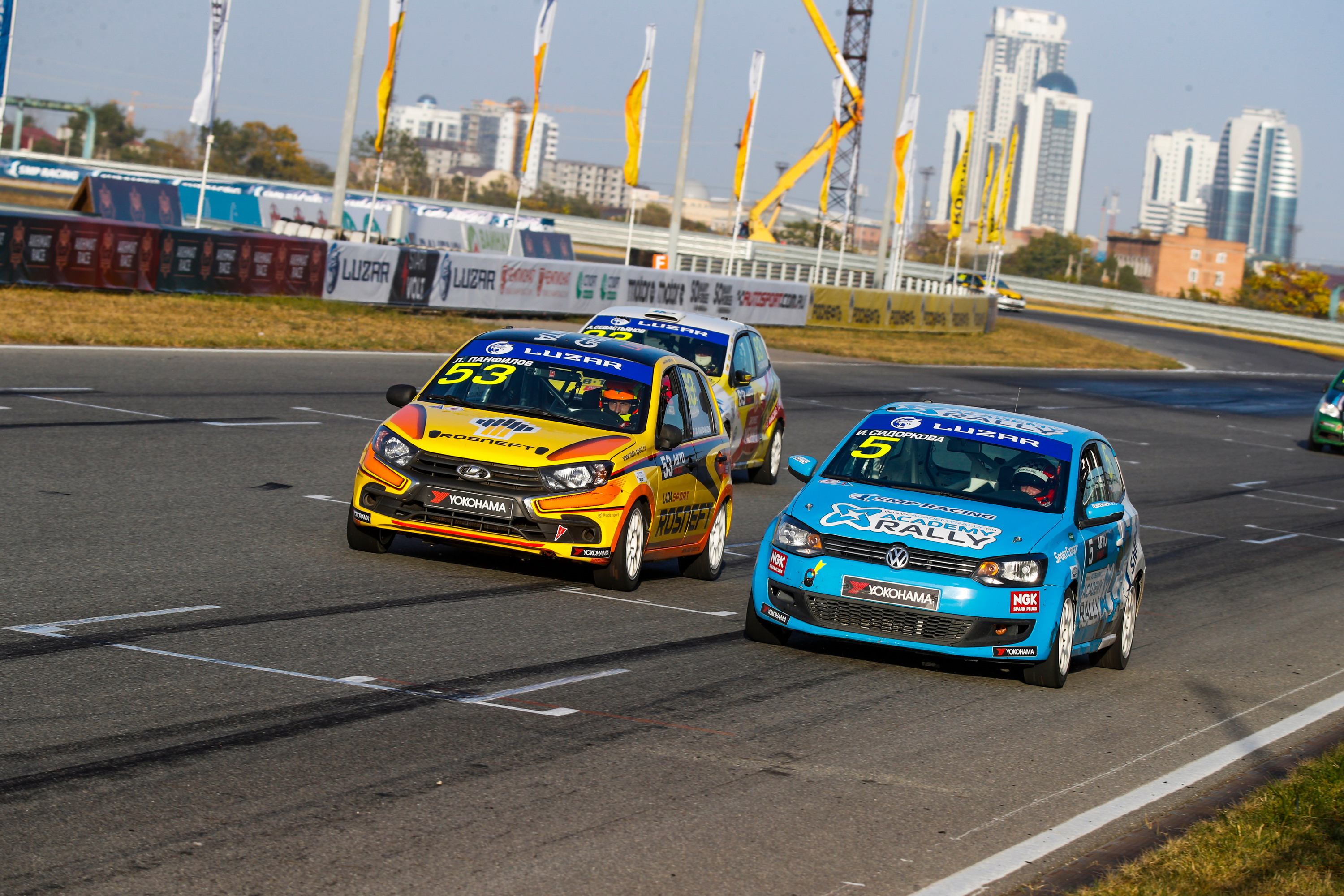
Sidorkova (right) in action at the Grozny round of the 2020 Russian Circuit Racing Series

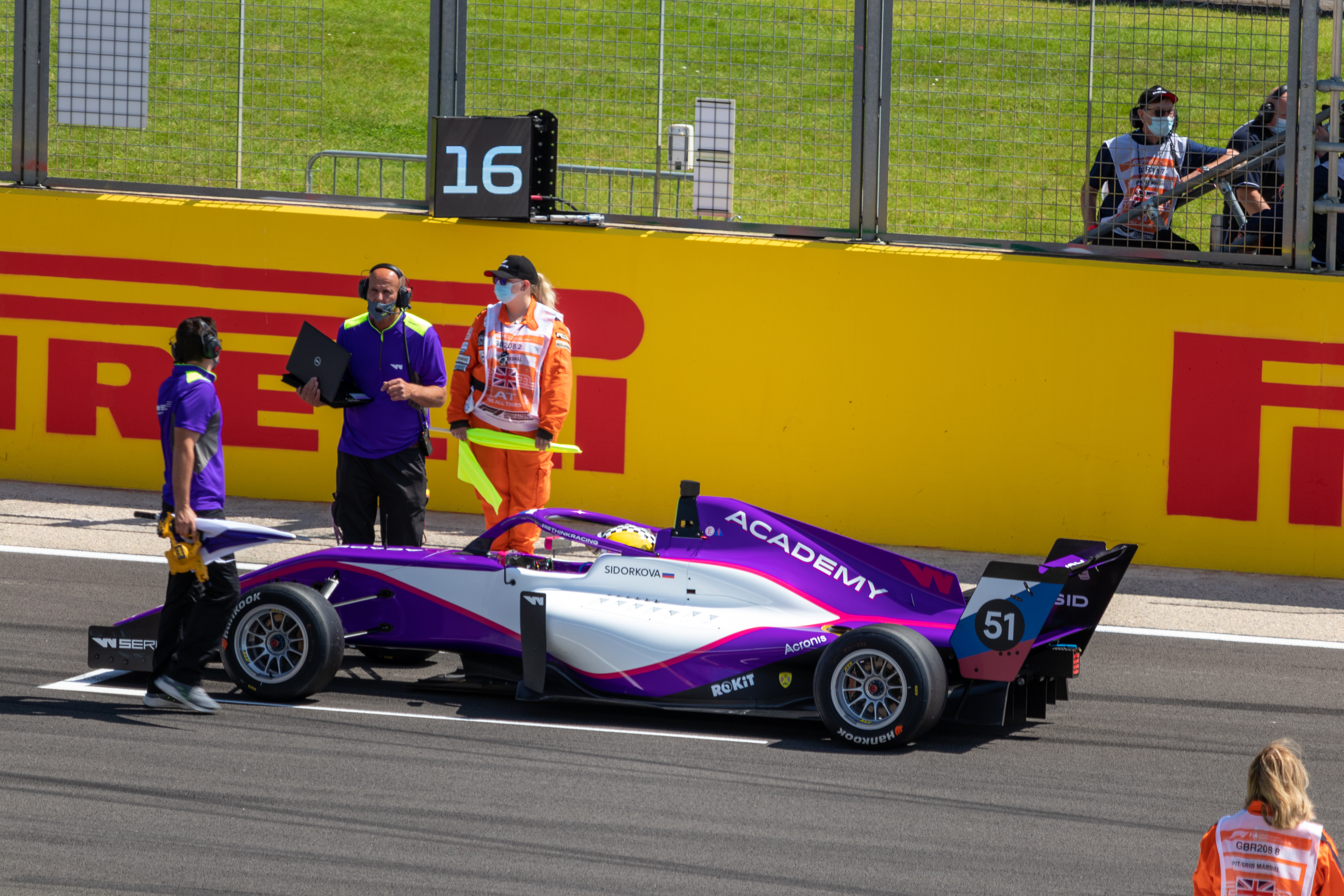
Sidorkova on the grid at the 2021 W Series Silverstone round

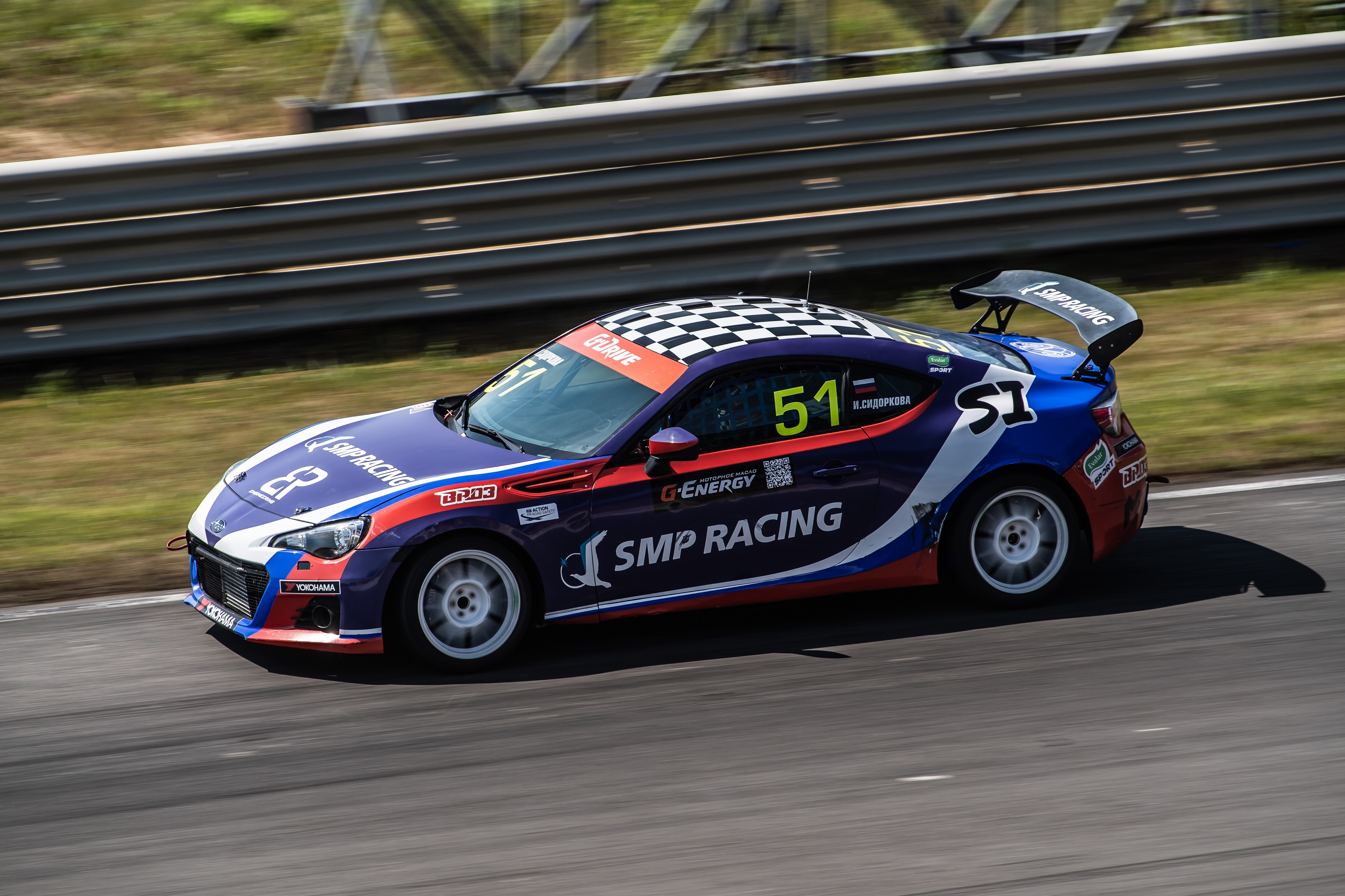
Sidorkova competing in the 2022 Russian Circuit Racing Series.

Sidorkova began karting aged six, having been inspired to race by the film Cars. Having competed across Northern Russia and the Baltics with success – including an Estonian championship in 2012 – she moved into rallying at the age of eleven and touring car racing through the Russian Circuit Racing Series at the age of thirteen, both opportunities coming through Volkswagen. Having won the National Junior class title in 2018, SMP Racing invited Sidorkova to contest the final round of the Formula 4 Northern European Zone Championship where she finished thirteenth in all three races. The SMP Racing Junior Team took her on board in 2019, and she would contest both the Russian and Spanish Formula 4 series, finishing sixth in the former and 18th in the latter.

Sidorkova applied for the W Series for 2020, a Formula 3 championship for female drivers. She passed the evaluation tests, becoming the youngest driver to do so. She was set to contest the 2020 championship before it was cancelled in response to the COVID-19 pandemic. A ten-event eSports series was held on iRacing in its place, with Sidorkova taking third place in the championship. She returned to the Russian Circuit Racing Series to fill her empty season, and finished ninth overall in the Touring-Light class with a win at the NRING Circuit.

2021 would see Sidorkova make her debut in the W Series. She started the year racing in the F3 Asian Championship for Evans GP as preparation, where she failed to score any points and finished 22nd out of the 26 participants. She would however score her first W Series podium in only her second appearance, at the Red Bull Ring in Austria. The remainder of the season was plagued with inconsistency as she went on to score points only once more in Hungary and missed the Spa-Francorchamps round after testing positive for COVID-19. Her season was interrupted again in October, with Sidorkova being refused a U.S. visa and thus sitting out the season finale at the Circuit of the Americas. She eventually finished ninth in the standings.

In November 2021, Sidorkova was invited to take part in a one-day FIA Formula 3 test at Magny-Cours, alongside fellow W Series driver Nerea Martí and Iron Dames racers Maya Weug and Doriane Pin.

Sidorkova was set to return to the W Series for 2022, but restrictions placed on Russian drivers in response to the Russian invasion of Ukraine forced her out "until further notice." Due to the conflict, she did not take part in any of the events that year and returned to Russia, and has only competed domestically since.

== Karting record ==
=== Karting career summary ===
| Season | Series | Team | Position |
|---|---|---|---|
| 2010 | Easykart International Grand Finals — Easy 50 | Karelia Karting Team | NC |
| 2012 | WSK Final Cup — 60 Mini | Luxor Racing Team | 23rd |

== Racing record ==
=== Racing career summary ===
| Season | Series | Team | Races | Wins | Poles | F/Laps | Podiums | Points | Position |
|---|---|---|---|---|---|---|---|---|---|
| 2017 | Russian Circuit Racing Series - National Junior | Rally Academy | 10 | 3 | 1 | 2 | 6 | 171 | **2nd** |
| 2018 | Russian Circuit Racing Series - National Junior | Rally Academy | 10 | 3 | 1 | 5 | 6 | 163 | **1st** |
| 2018 | SMP F4 Championship | SMP Racing | 3 | 0 | 0 | 0 | 0 | 0 | 23rd |
| 2019 | SMP F4 Championship | SMP Racing | 11 | 0 | 0 | 0 | 2 | 96 | 6th |
| 2019 | F4 Spanish Championship | Drivex School | 18 | 0 | 0 | 0 | 0 | 15 | 18th |
| 2020 | Russian Circuit Racing Series - Touring Light | Rally Academy | 12 | 1 | 1 | 1 | 2 | 110 | 9th |
| 2021 | W Series | W Series Academy | 5 | 0 | 0 | 0 | 1 | 34 | 9th |
| 2021 | F3 Asian Championship | Evans GP | 12 | 0 | 0 | 0 | 0 | 0 | 22nd |
| 2022 | Russian Circuit Racing Series - Super Production | Sofit Racing Team | 12 | 2 | 0 | 2 | 6 | 176 | 6th |
| 2024 | Russian Circuit Racing Series - GT4 | SMP Racing | 18 | 0 | 0 | 2 | 4 | 233 | 4th |
| 2024 | Games of the Future - Formula 4 | BR Engineering | 1 | 0 | 0 | 0 | 1 | N/A | **3rd** |
| 2025 | Russian Circuit Racing Series - GT4 | G-Drive SMP Racing by Capital Racing Team | 12 | 2 | 2 | 6 | 7 | 263 | **1st** |
| 2026 | Russian Circuit Racing Series - GT4 | SMP Racing x Putin Clothing Team | | | | | | | |

=== Complete SMP F4 Championship results ===
(key) (Races in bold indicate pole position) (Races in italics indicate fastest lap)

| Year | Team | 1 | 2 | 3 | 4 | 5 | 6 | 7 | 8 | 9 | 10 | 11 | 12 | 13 | 14 | 15 | 16 | 17 | 18 | 19 | 20 | 21 | DC | Points |
|---|---|---|---|---|---|---|---|---|---|---|---|---|---|---|---|---|---|---|---|---|---|---|---|---|
| 2018 | SMP Racing | SMO; 1 | SMO; 2 | SMO; 3 | NRG; 1 | NRG; 2 | NRG; 3 | MSC; 1 | MSC; 2 | MSC; 3 | ADM; 1 | ADM; 2 | ADM; 3 | AHV; 1 | AHV; 2 | AHV; 3 | ALA; 1 | ALA; 2 | ALA; 3 | ASS; 1; 13 | ASS; 2; 13 | ASS; 3; 13 | 23rd | 0 |
| 2019 | SMP Racing | FGA; Ret | NRG; 1; 6 | NRG; 2; 6 | SMO; 1 | SMO; 2 | KZR; 1; 3 | KZR; 2 Ret | ADM; 1; 4 | ADM; 2; 3 | MSC; 1 Ret | MSC; 2; 6 | ALA; 1; 9 | ALA; 2; 7 | | | | | | | | | 6th | 96 |

=== Complete F4 Spanish Championship results ===
(key) (Races in bold indicate pole position) (Races in italics indicate fastest lap)

| Year | Team | 1 | 2 | 3 | 4 | 5 | 6 | 7 | 8 | 9 | 10 | 11 | 12 | 13 | 14 | 15 | 16 | 17 | 18 | 19 | 20 | 21 | DC | Points |
|---|---|---|---|---|---|---|---|---|---|---|---|---|---|---|---|---|---|---|---|---|---|---|---|---|
| 2019 | Drivex School | NAV; 1; 13 | NAV; 2; 11 | NAV; 3; 8 | LEC; 1; 11 | LEC; 2; 14 | LEC; 3; 15 | ARA; 1; 13 | ARA; 2; 11 | ARA; 3; 6 | CRT; 1; 16 | CRT; 2; 14 | CRT; 3; 14 | JER; 1; 11 | JER; 2; 13 | JER; 3; 14 | ALG; 1; 9 | ALG; 2; 10 | ALG; 3; 12 | CAT; 1 | CAT; 2 | CAT; 3 | 18th | 15 |

=== Complete F3 Asian Championship results ===
(key) (Races in bold indicate pole position) (Races in italics indicate the fastest lap of top ten finishers)

| Year | Entrant | 1 | 2 | 3 | 4 | 5 | 6 | 7 | 8 | 9 | 10 | 11 | 12 | 13 | 14 | 15 | DC | Points |
|---|---|---|---|---|---|---|---|---|---|---|---|---|---|---|---|---|---|---|
| 2021 | Evans GP | DUB; 1; 19 | DUB; 2; 19 | DUB; 3; 15 | ABU; 1; 19 | ABU; 2; 18 | ABU; 3 Ret | ABU; 1 | ABU; 2 | ABU; 3 | DUB; 1; 15 | DUB; 2; 14 | DUB; 3; 17 | ABU; 1; 14 | ABU; 2; 12 | ABU; 3; 16 | 22nd | 0 |

=== Complete W Series results ===
(key) (Races in bold indicate pole position) (Races in italics indicate fastest lap)

| Year | Team | 1 | 2 | 3 | 4 | 5 | 6 | 7 | 8 | DC | Points |
|---|---|---|---|---|---|---|---|---|---|---|---|
| 2021 | W Series Academy | RBR1; 8 | RBR2; 2 | SIL; 14 | HUN; 4 | SPA; WD | ZAN; 13 | COA1 | COA2 | 9th | 34 |
