= Nerea Martí =

Spanish racing driver (born 2002)

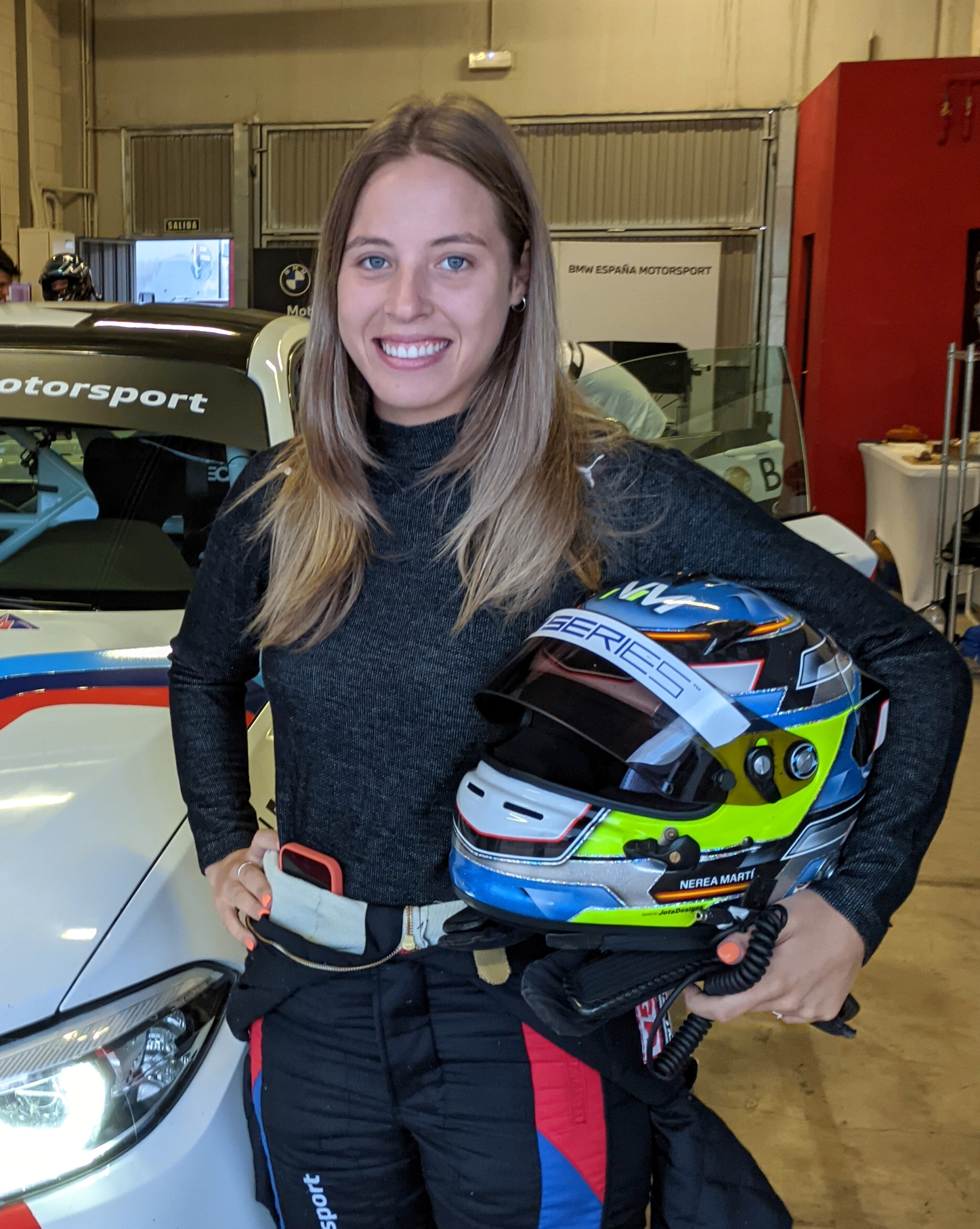
- Martí in 2022
- Nationality: (Spain) Spanish
- Born: Nerea Martí Martí; 2 January 2002 (age 24) Albalat dels Sorells, Valencia, Spain

F1 Academy
- Categorisation: FIA Silver
- Years active: 2023–2024
- Teams: Campos Racing
- Car number: 30
- Starts: 35
- Wins: 1
- Podiums: 10
- Poles: 1
- Fastest laps: 1
- Best finish: 4th in 2024

Previous series
- 2024; 2023–24; 2021–22; 2021–22; 2019: NACAM F4; F1 Academy; W Series; GT Winter Series; F4 Spanish Championship

Nerea Martí Martí (born 2 January 2002) is a Spanish racing driver. She previously raced in GT CER Spanish Championship with BMW Promotion Motorsport, W Series and F1 Academy.

Martí serves as a team ambassador for Andretti in Formula E.

== Career ==
=== Karting ===
Martí began karting aged nine through her father's rental kart track. Late in her karting career, she was contracted to Fórmula de Campeones in an attempt to step up into professional racing.

=== Lower formulae ===
Martí made her single-seater debut in Spanish Formula 4 in 2019, scoring a podium in her first event. A pair of seventh places late in the season would see her finish 16th in the standings and second in the female trophy behind Belén García.

=== W Series ===
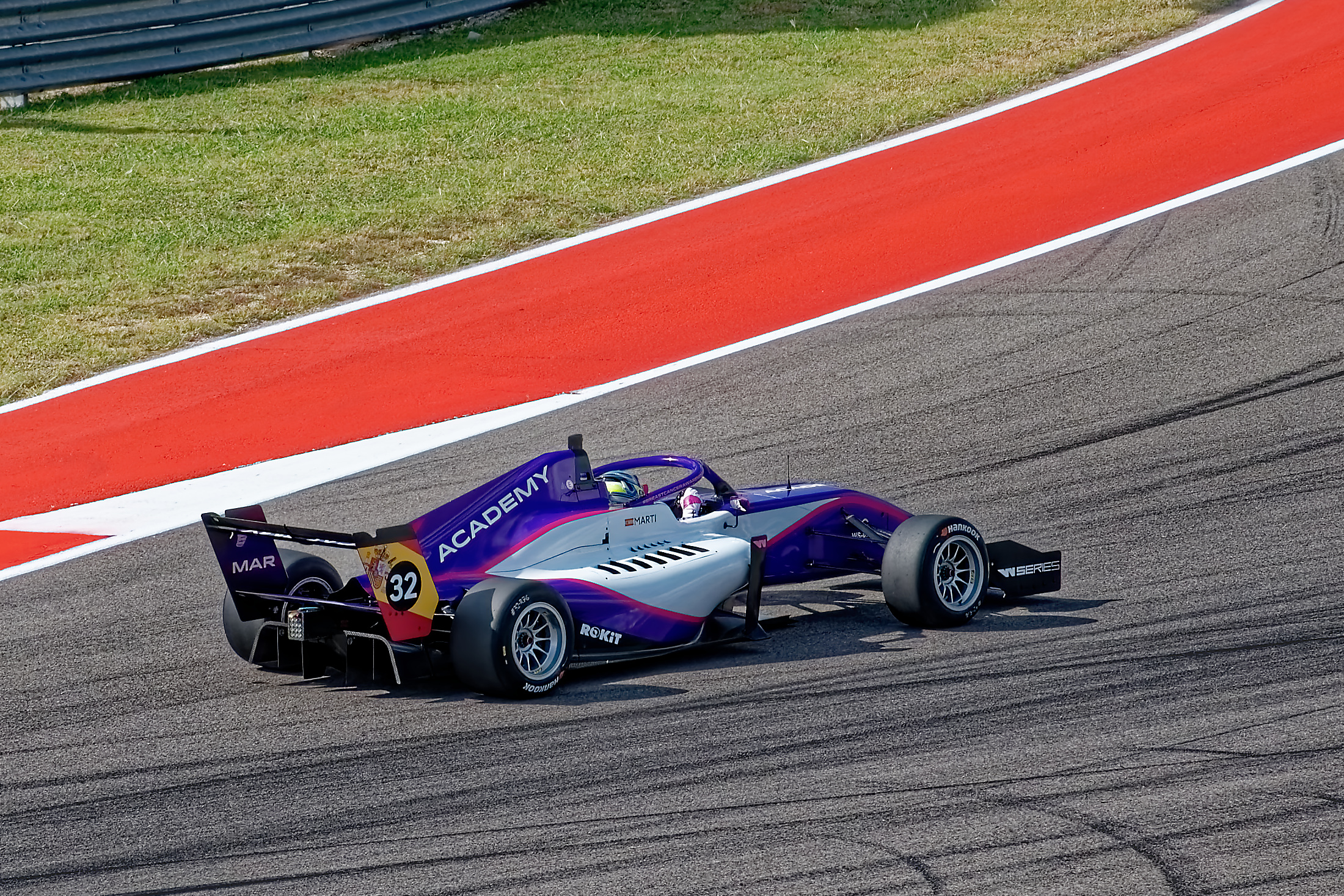
Martí competing in the W Series in Austin, Texas in 2021.

In 2020, Martí qualified for the second edition of the W Series, a Formula 3 championship exclusively for women. The season was eventually cancelled as a result of the COVID-19 pandemic, after which she opted to race in the Spanish Karting Championship, where she finished 8th in the KZ category.

==== 2021 ====
Martí would eventually make her W Series debut in 2021. She achieved her first and only podium of the season at the Hungaroring, but finished fourth in the standings—as the best rookie—having scored points in all eight rounds.

==== 2022 ====
Martí qualified on pole position for the first race of the 2022 season, at the Miami International Autodrome. It was her first W Series pole position.

=== FIA Formula 3 ===
Martí was selected to take part in a one-day FIA Formula 3 test at Magny-Cours in November 2021, alongside fellow W Series driver Irina Sidorkova and Iron Dames racers Maya Weug and Doriane Pin.

=== F1 Academy ===
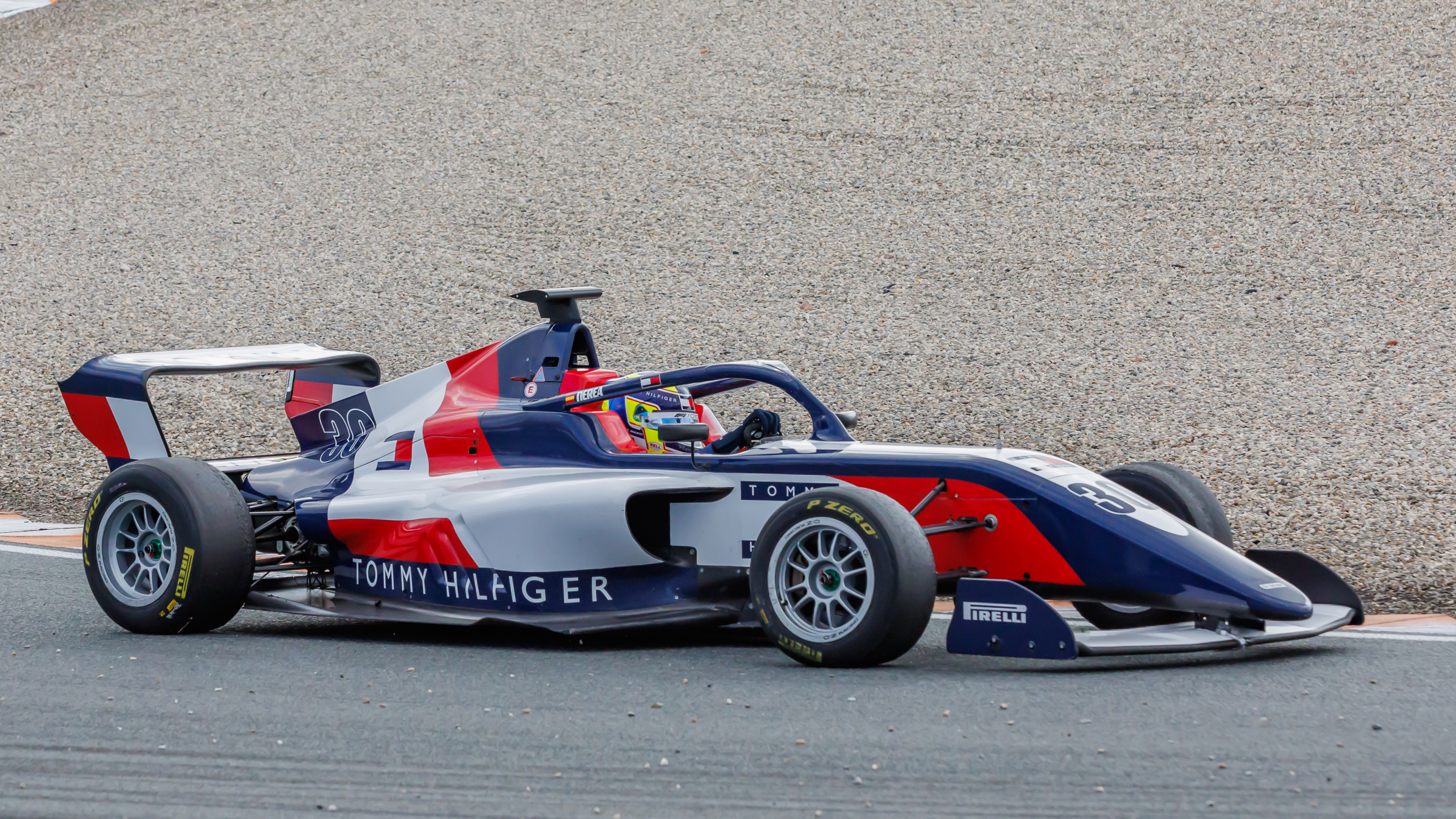
Martí competing in an F1 Academy race at Zandvoort in 2024.

Martí was announced as a driver for Campos Racing for the inaugural F1 Academy season. She was disqualified in the first race of the first round at Spielberg, but for the second and third race at the same round she managed a fourth and fifth place finish respectively, earning her fifteen points and taking her to eighth in the championship standings.

Martí remained in Campos Racing for 2024 with support from Tommy Hilfiger. At the first round at Jeddah in Race 1, Martí was running in fourth but was tagged by Lola Lovinfosse in the final lap and finished in 14th. In Race 2, she finished the race in fourth but was promoted to third after race winner Doriane Pin was given a post-race 20-second time penalty for crossing the finishing line twice.

=== Formula E ===
Martí drove for Andretti in the 2024 Formula E women's test, alongside F1 Academy teammate Chloe Chambers. She placed 13th in the test. She returned to Andretti for the 2025 women's test in Valencia, and in 2026, formally became a team ambassador.

== Personal life ==
Martí is married to footballer Hugo Duro. She is not related to fellow Spanish racer Pepe Martí.

== Karting record ==
=== Karting career summary ===
Season	Series	Team	Position
2017	Spanish Championship Karting - Junior		7th
2019	IAME Winter Cup - X30 Senior	Praga Espana Motorsport	12th
2020	LeCont Trophy - KZ	Praga España	2nd

== Racing record ==
=== Racing career summary ===
Season	Series	Team	Races	Wins	Poles	F/Laps	Podiums	Points	Position
2019	F4 Spanish Championship	Fórmula de Campeones Praga F4	21	0	0	0	1	35	16th
2021	W Series	W Series Academy	8	0	0	0	1	61	4th
2021–22	GT Winter Series	BMW España Motorsport	12	5	0	0	12	234	**2nd**
2022	W Series	Quantfury W Series Team	7	0	1	0	2	44	7th
2022	CER - D1	BMW España Promotion Motorsport	8	6	1	0	7	245.2	**2nd**
2023	Formula Winter Series	Campos Racing	2	0	0	0	0	7	14th
2023	F1 Academy	Campos Racing	21	1	1	1	6	181	4th
2023	Spanish GT Championship	BMW España Promotion Motorsport	8	0	0	0	1	155	9th
2024	F1 Academy	Campos Racing	14	0	0	0	4	136	4th
2024	F4 Spanish Championship	GRS Team	6	0	0	0	0	0	43rd
2024	Supercars Endurance Championship - GT4 Pro	BMW España Promotion Motorsport	6	0	0	0	3	93	4th
2024	NACAM Formula 4 Championship	Alessandros Racing	3	1	0	2	3	61	6th
2025	Supercars Endurance Series - GT4 Pro	BMW Promotion Motorsport	8	2	1	0	3	108	5th
2026	E1 Series	Team Alula	5	0	1	0	2	109	5th

=== Complete F4 Spanish Championship results ===
(key) (Races in bold indicate pole position) (Races in italics indicate fastest lap)

Year	Entrant	1	2	3	4	5	6	7	8	9	10	11	12	13	14	15	16	17	18	19	20	21	DC	Points
2019	Fórmula de Campeones Praga F4	NAV; 1; 16	NAV; 2; 2	NAV; 3; 9	LEC; 1; 12	LEC; 2; 16	LEC; 3; 16	ARA; 1; 14	ARA; 2; 12	ARA; 3; 9	CRT; 1; 13	CRT; 2; 13	CRT; 3; 12	JER; 1 Ret	JER; 2; 10	JER; 3; 13	ALG; 1; 8	ALG; 2; 7	ALG; 3; 9	CAT; 1; 15	CAT; 2; 9	CAT; 3; 7	16th	35
2024	GRS Team	JAR; 1	JAR; 2	JAR; 3	POR; 1	POR; 2	POR; 3	LEC; 1	LEC; 2	LEC; 3	ARA; 1; 26	ARA; 2; 32	ARA; 3; 27	CRT; 1; 22	CRT; 2; 28	CRT; 3; 33	JER; 1	JER; 2	JER; 3	CAT; 1	CAT; 2	CAT; 3	43rd	0

=== Complete W Series results ===
(key) (Races in bold indicate pole position) (Races in italics indicate fastest lap)

Year	Team	1	2	3	4	5	6	7	8	DC	Points
2021	W Series Academy	RBR1; 7	RBR2; 7	SIL; 5	HUN; 3	SPA; 8	ZAN; 4	COA1; 8	COA2; 8	4th	61
2022	Quantfury W Series Team	**MIA1**; 6	MIA2; 3	CAT; 8	SIL; 9	LEC; 3	HUN; 12	SIN; 12		7th	44

=== Complete Formula Winter Series results ===
(key) (Races in bold indicate pole position; races in italics indicate fastest lap)

Year	Team	1	2	3	4	5	6	7	8	DC	Points
2023	Campos Racing	JER; 1	JER; 2	CRT; 1; 7	CRT; 2; 10	NAV; 1	NAV; 2	CAT; 2	CAT; 2	14th	7

=== Complete F1 Academy results ===
(key) (Races in bold indicate pole position; races in italics indicate fastest lap)

Year	Team	1	2	3	4	5	6	7	8	9	10	11	12	13	14	15	16	17	18	19	20	21	DC	Points
2023	Campos Racing	RBR; 1 DSQ	RBR; 2; 4	RBR; 3; 5	**CRT**; **1**; 2	CRT; 2 NC	CRT; 3; 2	CAT; 1; 6	CAT; 2; 6	CAT; 3; 7	ZAN; 1; 3	ZAN; 2; 6	ZAN; 3; 6	MNZ; 1; 7	MNZ; 2; 11	MNZ; 3; 3	LEC; 1; 1	LEC; 2; 5	LEC; 3; 4	COA; 1; 9	COA; 2; 5	COA; 3; 2	4th	181
2024	Campos Racing	JED; 1; 14†	JED; 2; 3	MIA; 1; 4	MIA; 2; 7	CAT; 1; 2	CAT; 2; 4	ZAN; 1; 2	ZAN; 2; 8	SIN; 1; 7	SIN; 2; 5	LSL; 1; 8	LSL; 2 C	YMC; 1; 6	YMC; 2; 6	YMC; 3; 3							4th	136

=== Complete NACAM Formula 4 Championship results ===
(key) (Races in bold indicate pole position; races in italics indicate fastest lap)

Year	Team	1	2	3	4	5	6	7	8	9	DC	Points
2024	Alessandros Racing	AHR1; 1	AHR1; 2	AHR1; 3	PUE; 1	PUE; 2	PUE; 3	AHR2; 1; 2	AHR2; 2; 1	AHR2; 3; 2	6th	61
