= 2021 Silverstone W Series round =

2021 W Series Silverstone round
- Event 3 of 7 of the 2021 W Series
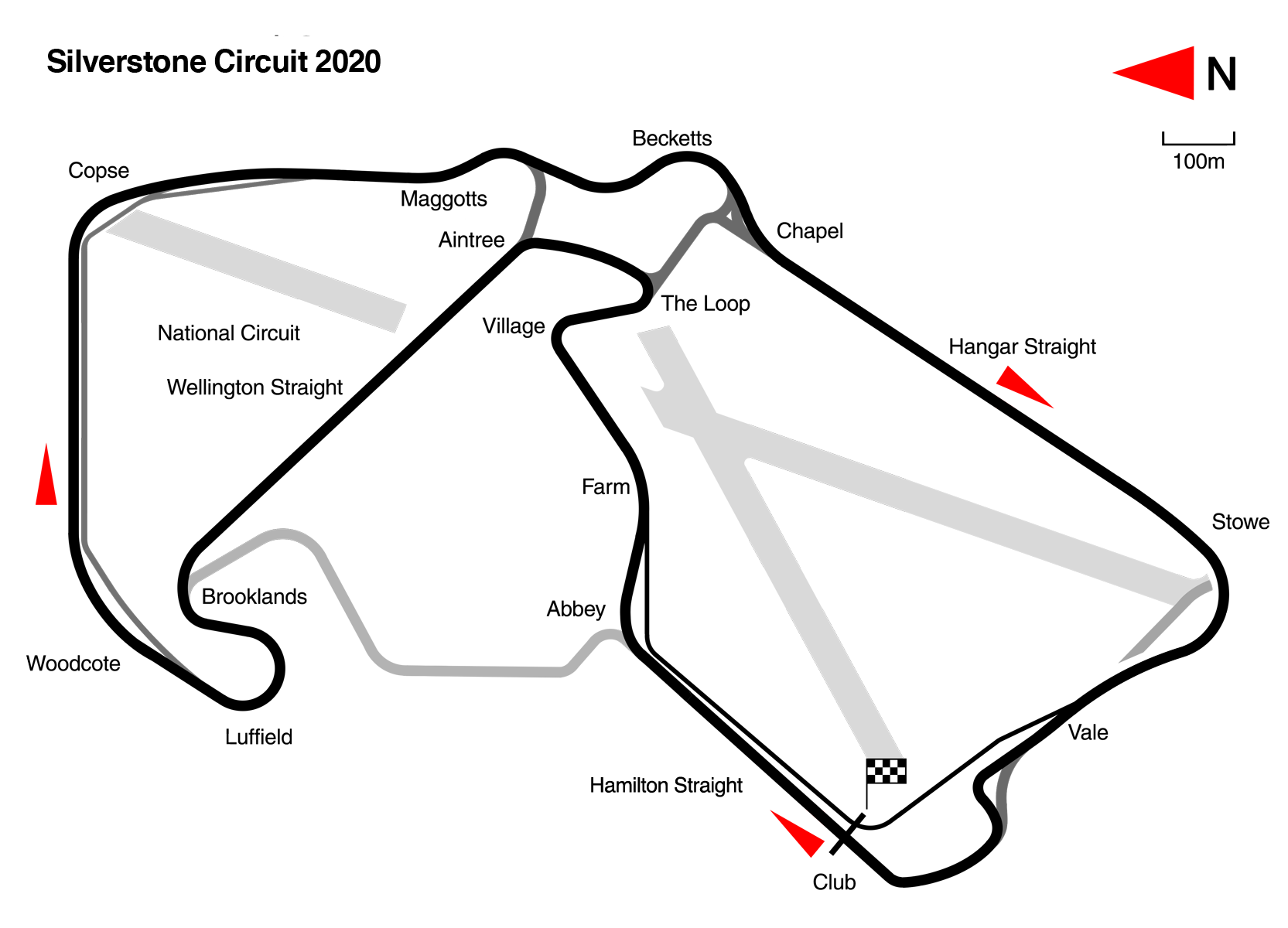

Race details
- Date: 17 July 2021
- Official name: 2021 W Series Silverstone round
- Location: Silverstone Circuit, Silverstone, Northamptonshire, England
- Course: Permanent circuit
- Course length: 5.891 km (3.661 miles)
- Distance: 16 laps, 94.256 km (58.576 miles)

Pole position
| Driver | (United Kingdom) Alice Powell | Racing X |
- Time: 1:57.235

Fastest lap
| Driver | (United Kingdom) Alice Powell | Racing X |
- Time: 1:58.094

Podium
| First | (United Kingdom) Alice Powell | Racing X |
| Second | (Liechtenstein) Fabienne Wohlwend (Note: Wohlwend races with a Swiss licence however is a Liechtenstein citizen and passport holder.) | Bunker Racing |
| Third | (United Kingdom) Jamie Chadwick | Veloce Racing |

The 2021 W Series Silverstone round was the third round of seven in the 2021 W Series, and took place at the Silverstone Circuit in the United Kingdom on 17 July 2021. The event was an undercard to the 2021 Formula One World Championship round at the same circuit.

== Report ==
=== Background ===
Abbi Pulling replaced Gosia Rdest at the Puma W Series Team.

Jamie Chadwick led the championship on 33 points, 3 points ahead of Sarah Moore.

=== Race ===
Fabienne Wohlwend took the fight to polesitter Alice Powell off the line, the Liechtensteiner prevailing in a side-by-side fight that lasted three corners. Beitske Visser once again struggled to get away from the line and dropped into the midfield, whereas Miki Koyama remained stuck on the grid for a lengthy period with gearbox issues that had been persistent through practice and qualifying.

Koyama lapped some six seconds off the pace with her issues at the back of the field before her gearbox cried enough on lap 8, forcing her to pull off the circuit at Village. This brought out the safety car, which proved Wohlwend's undoing as she had been gapping Powell but destroyed her tyres in the process. On lap 12, Wohlwend ran wide at Vale, allowing Powell to get the undercut at Club and muscle past for the lead.

On the final lap, Jessica Hawkins attempted to pass Belén García for 10th place and the final point at The Loop, but clattered into the side of the Spanish driver and put her out with suspension damage on the spot. Hawkins received a 20 second time penalty for the incident, making her the only British driver not to score points.

Powell won the race from Wohlwend and Jamie Chadwick. Visser recovered to sixth and Abbi Pulling scored points on her début with eighth.

== Classification ==
=== Practice ===
| Session | No. | Driver | Team | Time | Source |
|---|---|---|---|---|---|
| Practice 1 | 27 | (United Kingdom) Alice Powell | Racing X | 1:57.098 | |

=== Qualifying ===
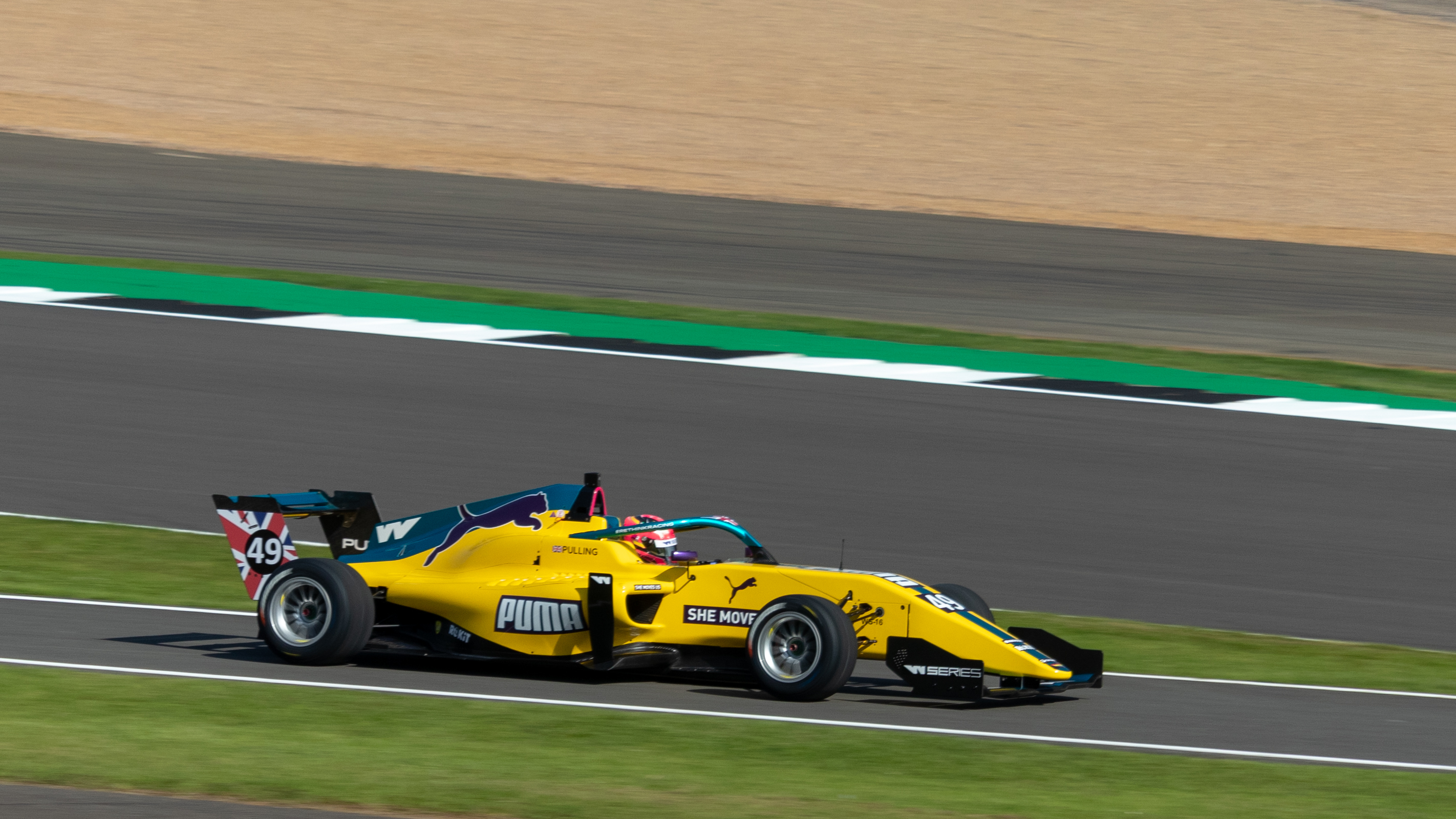
Abbi Pulling made her series début.

| Pos. | No. | Driver | Team | Time/Gap |
|---|---|---|---|---|
| 1 | 27 | (United Kingdom) Alice Powell | Racing X | 1:57.235 |
| 2 | 5 | (Liechtenstein) Fabienne Wohlwend | Bunker Racing | +0.362 |
| 3 | 55 | (United Kingdom) Jamie Chadwick | Veloce Racing | +0.525 |
| 4 | 95 | (Netherlands) Beitske Visser | M. Forbes Motorsport | +0.704 |
| 5 | 7 | (Finland) Emma Kimiläinen | Écurie W | +0.772 |
| 6 | 32 | (Spain) Nerea Martí | W Series Academy | +0.791 |
| 7 | 26 | (United Kingdom) Sarah Moore | Scuderia W | +0.854 |
| 8 | 49 | (United Kingdom) Abbi Pulling | Puma W Series Team | +0.967 |
| 9 | 22 | (Spain) Belén García | Scuderia W | +0.995 |
| 10 | 19 | (Spain) Marta García | Puma W Series Team | +1.035 |
| 11 | 21 | (United Kingdom) Jessica Hawkins | Racing X | +1.059 |
| 12 | 44 | (United Kingdom) Abbie Eaton | Écurie W | +1.225 |
| 13 | 11 | (Italy) Vittoria Piria | Sirin Racing | +1.313 |
| 14 | 17 | (Norway) Ayla Ågren | M. Forbes Motorsport | +1.391 |
| 15 | 97 | (Brazil) Bruna Tomaselli | Veloce Racing | +1.404 |
| 16 | 51 | (Russia) Irina Sidorkova | W Series Academy | +1.573 |
| 17 | 54 | (Japan) Miki Koyama | Sirin Racing | +1.622 |
| 18 | 37 | (United States) Sabré Cook | Bunker Racing | +2.185 |

=== Race ===
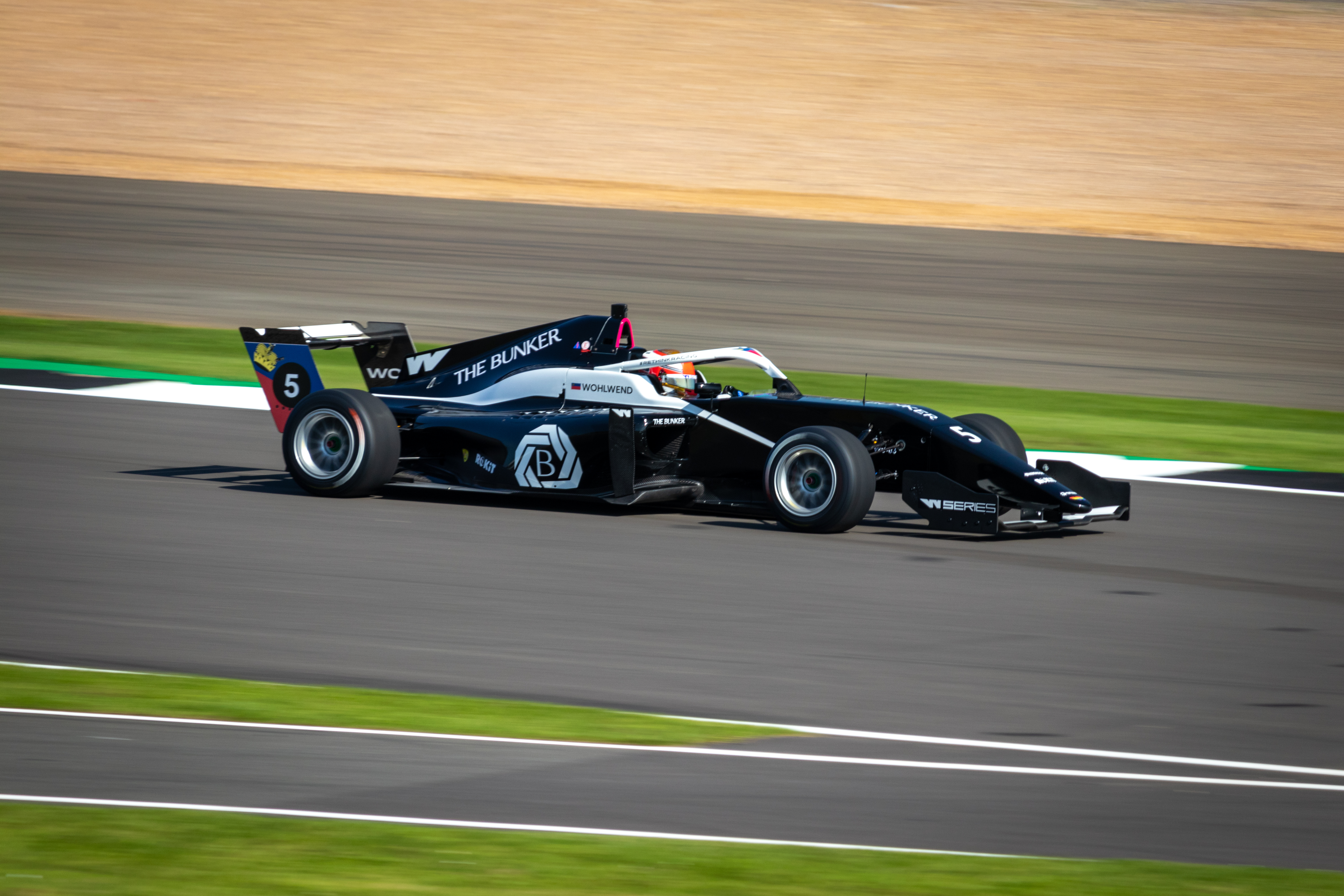
Fabienne Wohlwend led most of the race but finished second.

| Pos. | No. | Driver | Team | Laps | Time/Retired | Grid | Pts |
|---|---|---|---|---|---|---|---|
| 1 | 27 | (United Kingdom) Alice Powell | Racing X | 16 | 32:39.244 | 1 | 25 |
| 2 | 5 | (Liechtenstein) Fabienne Wohlwend | Bunker Racing | 16 | +1.919 | 2 | 18 |
| 3 | 55 | (United Kingdom) Jamie Chadwick | Veloce Racing | 16 | +4.030 | 3 | 15 |
| 4 | 7 | (Finland) Emma Kimiläinen | Écurie W | 16 | +5.784 | 5 | 12 |
| 5 | 32 | (Spain) Nerea Martí | W Series Academy | 16 | +8.483 | 6 | 10 |
| 6 | 95 | (Netherlands) Beitske Visser | M. Forbes Motorsport | 16 | +9.090 | 4 | 8 |
| 7 | 26 | (United Kingdom) Sarah Moore | Scuderia W | 16 | +10.491 | 7 | 6 |
| 8 | 49 | (United Kingdom) Abbi Pulling | Puma W Series Team | 16 | +11.088 | 8 | 4 |
| 9 | 44 | (United Kingdom) Abbie Eaton | Écurie W | 16 | +12.145 | 11 | 2 |
| 10 | 11 | (Italy) Vittoria Piria | Sirin Racing | 16 | +14.495 | 12 | 1 |
| 11 | 97 | (Brazil) Bruna Tomaselli | Veloce Racing | 16 | +15.022 | 15 | |
| 12 | 19 | (Spain) Marta García | Puma W Series Team | 16 | +15.887 | 13 | |
| 13 | 37 | (United States) Sabré Cook | Bunker Racing | 16 | +16.489 | 18 | |
| 14 | 51 | (Russia) Irina Sidorkova | W Series Academy | 16 | +17.102 | 16 | |
| 15 | 17 | (Norway) Ayla Ågren | M. Forbes Motorsport | 16 | +30.223 | 14 | |
| 16 | 21 | (United Kingdom) Jessica Hawkins | Racing X | 16 | +33.991^{1} | 10 | |
| DNF | 22 | (Spain) Belén García | Scuderia W | 15 | Collision | 9 | |
| DNF | 54 | (Japan) Miki Koyama | Sirin Racing | 8 | Mechanical | 17 | |
Fastest lap set by Alice Powell: 1:58.094

- ^1 – Hawkins received a 20 second time penalty for causing a collision.

== Championship standings ==
| Pos. | Driver | Pts | Gap |
|---|---|---|---|
| 1 | (United Kingdom) Alice Powell | 54 | |
| 2 | (United Kingdom) Jamie Chadwick | 48 | -6 |
| 3 | (United Kingdom) Sarah Moore | 36 | -18 |
| 4 | (Liechtenstein) Fabienne Wohlwend | 34 | -20 |
| 5 | (Finland) Emma Kimiläinen | 27 | -27 |

== See also ==
- 2021 British Grand Prix

== Notes ==
| Previous race: 2021 W Series Spielberg round 2 | W Series; 2021 season | Next race: 2021 W Series Budapest round |
