= 2021 2nd Spielberg W Series round =

2021 W Series Spielberg round 2
- Event 2 of 7 of the 2021 W Series

Race details
- Date: 3 July 2021
- Official name: 2021 W Series Spielberg round 2
- Location: Red Bull Ring, Spielberg, Styria, Austria
- Course: Permanent circuit
- Course length: 4.318 km (2.683 miles)
- Distance: 21 laps, 90.678 km (57.978 miles)

Pole position
Driver	(United Kingdom) Jamie Chadwick	Veloce Racing
- Time: 1:28.473

Fastest lap
Driver	(United Kingdom) Jamie Chadwick	Veloce Racing
- Time: 1:29.607

Podium
First	(United Kingdom) Jamie Chadwick	Veloce Racing
Second	(Russia) Irina Sidorkova	W Series Academy
Third	(Finland) Emma Kimiläinen	Écurie W

The 2021 W Series Spielberg round 2 was the second round of seven in the 2021 W Series, and took place at the Red Bull Ring in Austria on 3 July 2021. The event was an undercard to the 2021 Formula One World Championship round at the same circuit.

== Report ==
=== Background ===
The event was initially scheduled as the opening round of the season to be held at Circuit Paul Ricard in conjunction with the 2021 French Grand Prix, however amendments made to the 2021 Formula One calendar resulted in the change.

Alice Powell led the championship on 25 points, 7 points ahead of Sarah Moore.

=== Race ===
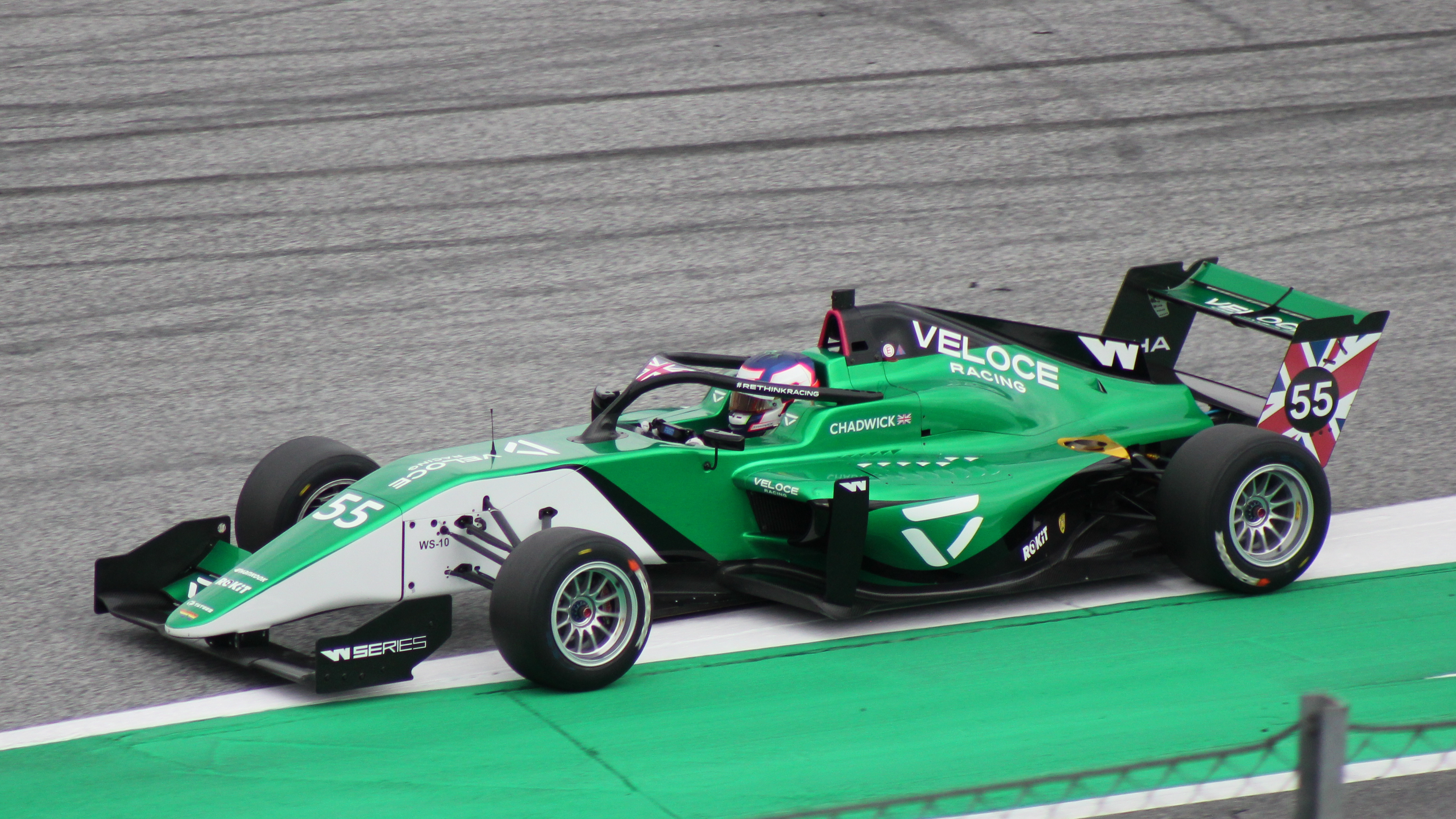
Reigning champion Jamie Chadwick took her first win of the season.

The 2019 championship protagonists shared the front row of the grid but Beitske Visser stalled on the line and gave polesitter Jamie Chadwick a free kick heading into turn 1. Bruna Tomaselli and Irina Sidorkova leapfrogged Emma Kimiläinen at the start to briefly give Veloce Racing a 1–2 before Sidorkova track-extended her way around the outside into 2nd. Visser's team-mate Ayla Ågren and Marta García also stalled on the line. Kimiläinen re-passed Tomaselli on lap 2 and the oldest driver in the field set after the youngest driver in the field.

Bunker Racing team-mates Fabienne Wohlwend and Sabré Cook were the beneficiaries of the three stallers, moving from the back third of the field (Cook not setting a time in qualifying after she spun into a gravel trap) up to a battle for 10th. The American relegated her Liechtensteiner team-mate out of the points, whilst Sarah Moore found herself in a battle with a Spanish rookie for the second consecutive weekend – once again holding off said driver, this time Nerea Martí. Their battle proved fairer than that of Puma team-mates Marta García and Gosia Rdest; the Spaniard recovering from her earlier stall caught her Polish stablemate at the mid-point of the race and spun her out at turn 4.

The podium places were running away from the rest of the field – fourth-placed Tomaselli did not have the pace of the top three and formed a train with Moore next in line, who capitalised on the Brazilian's woes passing her for fourth on the penultimate lap. There was further movement within that pack as Abbie Eaton passed Martí for sixth. Cook meanwhile was struggling with balance issues late in the piece, resulting in both her team-mate and a hard-charging Visser passing her to battle over P10. A tough race for Miki Koyama was effectively ended after a pit-stop for a flat-spotted tyre left her a lap down.

Chadwick cruised to her first victory of the season, with Sidorkova holding out the much faster Kimiläinen for the entire race to finish second in her second W Series race. It was daylight back to the next group of cars; Sarah Moore some sixteen seconds behind the Finn as a result of Tomaselli's issues. The previous weekend's winner Alice Powell had an anonymous race, starting 12th and finishing 8th ahead of Belén García and Wohlwend – the Liechtensteiner beating Visser to the last point by just over two tenths of a second.

== Classification ==
=== Practice ===
Session	No.	Driver	Team	Time	Source
Practice 1	55	(United Kingdom) Jamie Chadwick	Veloce Racing	1:28.728	

=== Qualifying ===
Pos.	No.	Driver	Team	Time/Gap
1	55	(United Kingdom) Jamie Chadwick	Veloce Racing	1:28.473
2	95	(Netherlands) Beitske Visser	M. Forbes Motorsport	+0.118
3	7	(Finland) Emma Kimiläinen	Écurie W	+0.349
4	97	(Brazil) Bruna Tomaselli	Veloce Racing	+0.392
5	32	(Spain) Nerea Martí	W Series Academy	+0.540
6	51	(Russia) Irina Sidorkova	W Series Academy	+0.579
7	19	(Spain) Marta García	Puma W Series Team	+0.636
8	26	(United Kingdom) Sarah Moore	Scuderia W	+0.700
9	17	(Norway) Ayla Ågren	M. Forbes Motorsport	+0.803
10	22	(Spain) Belén García	Scuderia W	+0.875
11	44	(United Kingdom) Abbie Eaton	Écurie W	+1.088
12	11	(Italy) Vittoria Piria^{1}	Sirin Racing	+1.142
13	27	(United Kingdom) Alice Powell	Racing X	+1.160
14	5	(Liechtenstein) Fabienne Wohlwend (Note: Wohlwend races with a Swiss licence however is a Liechtenstein citizen and passport holder.)	Bunker Racing	+1.170
15	21	(United Kingdom) Jessica Hawkins	Racing X	+1.223
16	3	(Poland) Gosia Rdest	Puma W Series Team	+1.287
17	54	(Japan) Miki Koyama	Sirin Racing	+1.300
18	37	(United States) Sabré Cook	Bunker Racing	No time

- ^1 – Piria was given a 3-place grid penalty for causing a collision in the previous event.

=== Race ===
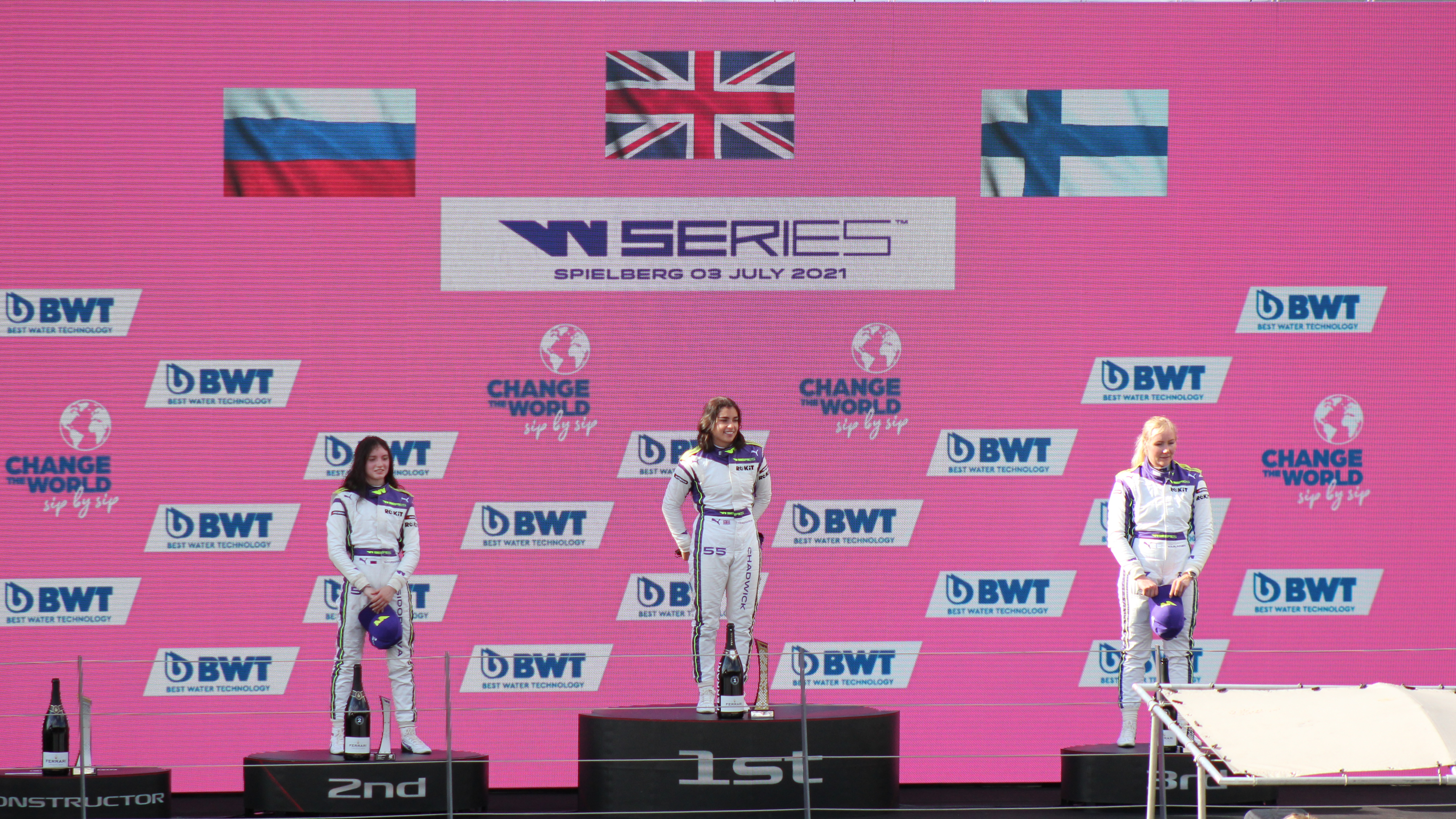
The podium ceremony.

Pos.	No.	Driver	Team	Laps	Time/Retired	Grid	Pts
1	55	(United Kingdom) Jamie Chadwick	Veloce Racing	21	31:33.119	1	25
2	51	(Russia) Irina Sidorkova	W Series Academy	21	+6.606	5	18
3	7	(Finland) Emma Kimiläinen	Écurie W	21	+6.929	6	15
4	26	(United Kingdom) Sarah Moore	Scuderia W	21	+22.939	8	12
5	97	(Brazil) Bruna Tomaselli	Veloce Racing	21	+25.183	3	10
6	44	(United Kingdom) Abbie Eaton	Écurie W	21	+26.075	11	8
7	32	(Spain) Nerea Martí	W Series Academy	21	+26.485	4	6
8	27	(United Kingdom) Alice Powell	Racing X	21	+26.735	12	4
9	22	(Spain) Belén García	Scuderia W	21	+27.244	10	2
10	5	(Liechtenstein) Fabienne Wohlwend	Bunker Racing	21	+27.535	13	1
11	95	(Netherlands) Beitske Visser	M. Forbes Racing	21	+27.764	2	
12	19	(Spain) Marta García	Puma W Series Team	21	+29.526	7	
13	37	(United States) Sabré Cook	Bunker Racing	21	+30.793	18	
14	17	(Norway) Ayla Ågren	M. Forbes Racing	21	+34.895	9	
15	11	(Italy) Vittoria Piria	Sirin Racing	21	+40.964	15	
16	21	(United Kingdom) Jessica Hawkins	Racing X	21	+42.921	14	
17	3	(Poland) Gosia Rdest	Puma W Series Team	21	+43.716	16	
18	54	(Japan) Miki Koyama	Sirin Racing	20	+1 lap	17	
Fastest lap set by Jamie Chadwick: 1:29.607

== Championship standings ==
Pos.	Driver	Pts	Gap
1	(United Kingdom) Jamie Chadwick	33	
2	(United Kingdom) Sarah Moore	30	-3
3	(United Kingdom) Alice Powell	29	-4
4	(Russia) Irina Sidorkova	22	-11
5	(Liechtenstein) Fabienne Wohlwend	16	-17

== See also ==
- 2021 Austrian Grand Prix

== Notes ==
Previous race: 2021 W Series Spielberg round	W Series; 2021 season	Next race: 2021 W Series Silverstone round
