= Miguel R. Forbes =

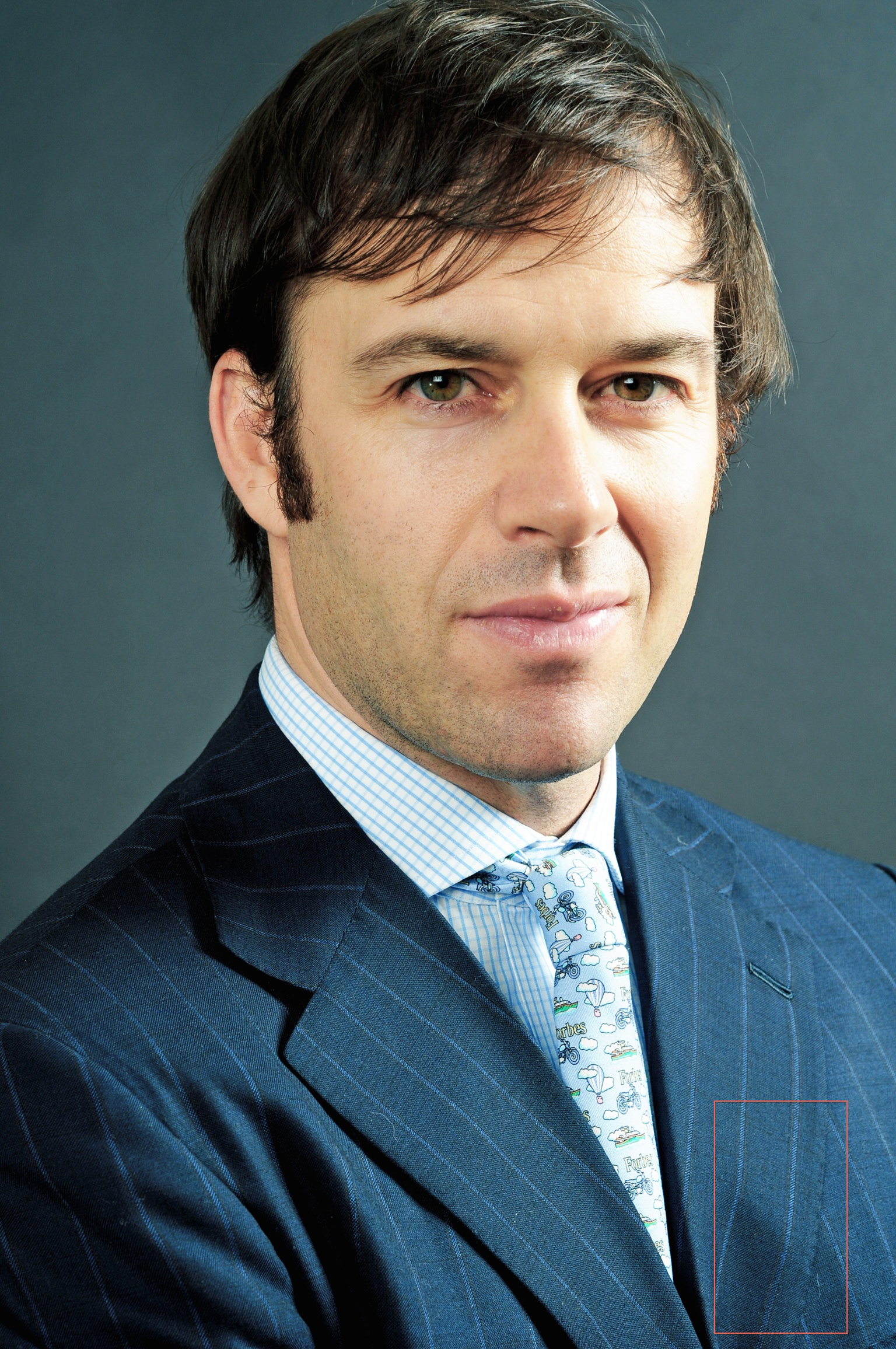
- Born: New York, New York
- Education: New York University (M.S., Publishing; B.A., English)
- Occupation: Publisher

Miguel R. Forbes is an American entrepreneur.

== Personal life and education ==
Forbes was born in Lenox Hill Hospital and raised in Manhattan; he is the son of Alberto and Lydia Raurell. His late father was a noted figure in the New York art scene and director of the Tamayo Museum in Mexico City. After his parents' divorce, his mother married Robert Forbes, making Miguel Forbes an adopted son and grandson of the Forbes publishing family. He attended the Rudolf Steiner School and graduated from Saint David's School in New York City. He has a B.A. in English and an M.S. in Publishing from New York University.

== Publishing career ==
Forbes served as President of Worldwide Development at Forbes, Inc. Prior to that, he was President of Forbes Television & Licensing. Forbes was appointed Forbes Vice President of Business Development in 2000 and launched nine foreign editions of Forbes in Korea, Russia, China, Arabia, Israel, Poland, Turkey, Romania, and Croatia. In March 2013, Forbes was instrumental in launching a Spanish-language version of Forbes in Spain, the first local edition of Forbes in Western Europe. In July 2013, Forbes announced that Forbes' latest local language edition, Forbes Hungary, would launch in late 2013.

Forbes launched “Forbes on Fox,” a weekly television program on Fox News, in May 2001. He became Executive Producer of Forbes SportsMoney, a series developed in partnership with the YES Network in 2008. The series won a New York Emmy award for Forbes in the Business/Consumer: Program/Special category for three years in a row, from 2012-2014. He initiated a number of Forbes specials produced for E! Entertainment Television that aired in 2007.

Forbes was a co-founder of Forbes.com. He is a contributor on the Forbes blog network, writing about foreign markets, leadership, and entrepreneurship. Forbes participated in the 13th Annual Forbes Global CEO Conference held in Bali in September 2013.

== Philanthropy ==
In 2005, Forbes became a Young Global Leader, a division of the World Economic Forum which consists of under-forty-year-old leaders who collaborate on an action plan for a vision of what the world could be like in 2020.

Forbes hosted the annual Forbes 400 Charity Poker Tournament in 2010, which raised $1.2 million to be split among 13 charities.

In 2013, Forbes was appointed to the New York University President’s Global Council by university president John Sexton.

== Entrepreneurship ==
Forbes extended the Forbes brand into financial services including Forbes Family Trust (FFT) and Forbes Private Capital Group. FFT, which focuses on providing services to high-net-worth clientele, merged with LGL partners in January 2013. Forbes Private Capital Group raises capital for hedge funds, private equity funds and real estate funds, and also raises funds for direct investments.

Forbes also co-founded Planetary Power, a sustainable energy company, in 2007 to address the world’s energy challenges with affordable renewable power available around the clock. In 2011, Forbes co-founded Startle.com, online home of the Forbes Travel Guide, with Jeff Arnold (founder of WebMD) and is a member of the board of directors.

Forbes has entered the commercial real estate market with the September 2013 announcement of the first Forbes Media Tower to be built in the Philippines. The tower will be built in Makati in partnership with Century Properties.

Forbes also initiated a partnership in 2014 that brought the Forbes brand into the mobile commerce market. A licensing agreement between Forbes and payment solutions provider Lotaris created Forbes Digital Commerce, which focuses on mobile payment applications and works with such platforms as MasterCard's MasterPass in-app payment solution.
