= 2018 Finali Mondiali =

Sports car race in Italy

(Italy) 2018 Finali Mondiali
Event Information
- Date: 1–4 November
- Location: Monza, Lombardy, Italy
- Venue: Autodromo Nazionale Monza
- Weather: Overcast

Results
Race 1
| Distance | 12 laps | 69.516 km |
| Winner | (Denmark) Nicklas Nielsen; Formula Racing | 25:51.494 |
Race 2
| Distance | 12 laps | 69.516 km |
| Winner | (Liechtenstein) Fabienne Wohlwend; Octane126 | 25:54.493 |
Race 3
| Distance | 15 laps | 86.895 km |
| Winner | (Switzerland) Christophe Hurni; Team Zenith Sion - Lausanne | 31:09.677 |
Race 4
| Distance | 13 laps | 75.309 km |
| Winner | (Sweden) Ingvar Mattsson; Scuderia Autoropa | 30:15.137 |

The 2018 Finali Mondiali was the 2018 edition of the season-ending event for all Ferrari Challenge championships. Held at the Autodromo Nazionale Monza in Italy, the event saw drivers from the Asia-Pacific, European and North American championships take part.

The headline Trofeo Pirelli Pro/Pro-Am race was marred by a 14-car crash at the original start, causing a red flag and shortening the race. The eventual Pro-Am winner, Fabienne Wohlwend, made history in becoming the first female winner at a Finali Mondiali – and, on a technicality, the first female World Champion in any four-wheel discipline.

== Classification ==
=== Trofeo Pirelli ===
| Pos | Class | No. | Driver | Team | Laps | Time/Retired | Grid |
|---|---|---|---|---|---|---|---|
| 1 | Pro | 9 | (Denmark) Nicklas Nielsen | (Denmark) Formula Racing | 12 | 25:51.494 | 3 |
| 2 | Pro | 2 | (Italy) David Fumanelli | (Italy) Rossocorsa | 12 | +0.709 | 2 |
| 3 | Pro | 44 | (Germany) Jens Liebhauser | (Denmark) Formula Racing | 12 | +1.710 | 5 |
| 4 | Pro-Am | 81 | (Liechtenstein) Fabienne Wohlwend | (Switzerland) Octane126 | 12 | +2.999 | 4 |
| 5 | Pro | 92 | (United Kingdom) Sam Smeeth | (Austria) Baron Motorsport | 12 | +5.269 | 7 |
| 6 | Pro-Am | 408 | (Indonesia) Renaldi Hutasoit | (Indonesia) Ferrari Jakarta | 12 | +5.862 | 8 |
| 7 | Pro | 211 | (United States) Peter Ludwig | (United States) Wide World Ferrari | 12 | +8.009 | 16 |
| 8 | Pro | 16 | (Singapore) Sean Hudspeth | (Denmark) Formula Racing | 12 | +10.636 | 15 |
| 9 | Pro-Am | 225 | (United States) Ross Chouest | (United States) Ferrari of Palm Beach | 12 | +13.791 | 25 |
| 10 | Pro-Am | 93 | (United Kingdom) Chris Froggatt | (United Kingdom) HR Owen | 12 | +14.080 | 6 |
| 11 | Pro-Am | 13 | (Sweden) Martin Nelson | (Sweden) Scuderia Autoropa | 12 | +18.577 | 17 |
| 12 | Pro | 213 | (Canada) Marc Muzzo | (Canada) Ferrari of Ontario | 12 | +19.266 | 31 |
| 13 | Pro-Am | 251 | (United States) Rob Hodes | (United States) Ferrari of Washington | 12 | +20.783 | 34 |
| 14 | Pro | 27 | (Italy) Alessandro Vezzoni | (Italy) Rossocorsa | 12 | +21.579 | 10 |
| 15 | Pro-Am | 480 | (Hong Kong) Alex Au | Blackbird Concessionaries Hong Kong | 12 | +23.668 | 22 |
| 16 | Pro-Am | 97 | (Italy) Tommaso Rocca | (Italy) Rossocorsa | 12 | +23.955 | 18 |
| 17 | Pro-Am | 61 | (United Kingdom) John Dhillon | (Denmark) Formula Racing | 12 | +27.957 | 33 |
| 18 | Pro-Am | 45 | (Denmark) Christian Overgård | (Austria) Baron Motorsport | 12 | +28.421 | 37 |
| 19 | Pro-Am | 407 | (Japan) Ken Seto | (Japan) Rosso Scuderia Tokyo | 11 | +1 Lap | 35 |
| DNF | Pro-Am | 448 | (Italy) Angelo Negro | (China) Italia Auto Shanghai | 4 | | 27 |
| DNF | Pro-Am | 212 | (United States) John Boyd | (United States) Ferrari of Denver | 4 | | 26 |
| DNF | Pro-Am | 210 | (Canada) Murray Rothlander | (Canada) Ferrari of Vancouver | 4 | | 24 |
| DNF | Pro | 84 | (Germany) Björn Grossmann | (Switzerland) Octane126 | 1 | | 1 |
| DNS | Pro | 263 | (United States) Cooper MacNeil | (United States) Ferrari of Beverly Hills | 0 | | 9 |
| DNS | Pro-Am | 401 | (Italy) Philippe Prette | Blackbird Concessionaries Hong Kong | 0 | | 11 |
| DNS | Pro-Am | 90 | (United Kingdom) Jack Brown | (United Kingdom) Ferrari GB | 0 | | 12 |
| DNS | Pro | 47 | (France) Henri Hassid | (France) Charles Pozzi | 0 | | 13 |
| DNS | Pro | 233 | (Chile) Benjamín Hites | (United States) The Collection | 0 | | 14 |
| DNS | Pro-Am | 424 | (Japan) "Go Max" | (Japan) M Auto Hiroshima | 0 | | 19 |
| DNS | Pro | 277 | (Philippines) Angie King | (United States) Ferrari of Beverly Hills | 0 | | 20 |
| DNS | Pro | 218 | (United States) James Weiland | (United States) Boardwalk Ferrari | 0 | | 21 |
| DNS | Pro | 85 | (Venezuela) Vicente Potolicchio | (Italy) Rossocorsa | 0 | | 23 |
| DNS | Pro | 219 | (United States) Chris Cagnazzi | (United States) Ferrari of Long Island | 0 | | 28 |
| DNS | Pro-Am | 405 | (Australia) Martin Berry | Italia Auto Singapore | 0 | | 29 |
| DNS | Pro | 261 | (United States) Jean-Claude Saada | (United States) Boardwalk Ferrari | 0 | | 30 |
| DNS | Pro-Am | 216 | (United States) Frank Selldorf | (United States) Ferrari of Fort Lauderdale | 0 | | 32 |
| DNS | Pro-Am | 469 | (Malaysia) Zen Low | Naza Italia Malaysia | 0 | | 36 |
Fastest lap set by David Fumanelli: 1:50.918

=== Coppa Shell Pro-Am ===
| Pos | Class | No. | Driver | Team | Laps | Time/Retired | Grid |
|---|---|---|---|---|---|---|---|
| 1 | Pro-Am | 162 | (Switzerland) Christophe Hurni | (Switzerland) Team Zenith Sion - Lausanne | 15 | 31:09.677 | 1 |
| 2 | Pro-Am | 321 | (United States) Thomas Tippl | (United States) Ferrari of Beverly Hills | 15 | +2.400 | 2 |
| 3 | Pro-Am | 183 | (Italy) Manuela Gostner | (Italy) Ineco - MP Racing | 15 | +8.280 | 6 |
| 4 | Pro-Am | 128 | (Sweden) Christian Kinch | (Germany) Gohm Motorsport | 15 | +9.325 | 5 |
| 5 | Pro-Am | 557 | (Lebanon) Tani Hanna | Scuderia Lebanon | 15 | +18.890 | 4 |
| 6 | Pro-Am | 109 | (Austria) Ernst Kirchmayr | (Austria) Baron Motorsport | 15 | +21.417 | 15 |
| 7 | Pro-Am | 177 | (Netherlands) Fons Scheltema | (Switzerland) Kessel Racing | 15 | +21.784 | 17 |
| 8 | Pro-Am | 173 | (Italy) Corinna Gostner | (Italy) Ineco - MP Racing | 15 | +32.572 | 10 |
| 9 | Pro-Am | 161 | (Italy) Thomas Gostner | (Italy) Ineco - MP Racing | 15 | +33.353 | 7 |
| 10 | Pro-Am | 120 | (Belgium) Guy Fawe | (Belgium) Scuderia FMA | 15 | +34.383 | 13 |
| 11 | Pro-Am | 550 | (Japan) Kazuyuki Yamaguchi | (Japan) Cornes Osaka | 15 | +35.457 | 20 |
| 12 | Pro-Am | 307 | (France) Chris Carel | (United States) Ferrari of Beverly Hills | 15 | +49.555 | 18 |
| 13 | Pro-Am | 144 | (Czech Republic) Vladimir Hladik | (Austria) Baron Motorsport | 15 | +51.187 | 9 |
| 14 | Pro-Am | 313 | (United States) Geoff Palermo | (United States) Ferrari of San Francisco | 15 | +59.008 | 23 |
| 15 | Pro-Am | 112 | (Canada) Rick Lovat | (Switzerland) Octane126 | 15 | +59.317 | 14 |
| 16 | Pro-Am | 127 | (Sweden) Thomas Lindroth | (Austria) Baron Motorsport | 15 | +1:00.153 | 21 |
| 17 | Pro-Am | 588 | (Taiwan) Tiger Wu | Modena Motori Taiwan | 15 | +1:01.369 | 11 |
| 18 | Pro-Am | 388 | (United States) David Varwig | (United States) Continental AutoSports | 15 | +1:19.937 | 24 |
| 19 | Pro-Am | 330 | (Mexico) Luis Perusquia | (United States) Ferrari of Tampa Bay | 14 | +1 Lap | 25 |
| DNF | Pro-Am | 342 | (United States) Mark Fuller | (United States) Ferrari Westlake | 10 | | 16 |
| DNF | Pro-Am | 181 | (Italy) Erich Prinoth | (Italy) Ineco - MP Racing | 1 | | 3 |
| DNF | Pro-Am | 198 | (Hong Kong) Eric Cheung | (Denmark) Formula Racing | 1 | | 8 |
| DNF | Pro-Am | 568 | (China) Yan-Bin Xing | (China) CTF Beijing | 1 | | 12 |
| DNS | Pro-Am | 563 | (Hong Kong) Vincent Wong | Blackbird Concessionaries Hong Kong | 0 | | 19 |
| DNS | Pro-Am | 371 | (United States) Brian Kamineskey | (United States) Ferrari of Long Island | 0 | | 22 |
Fastest lap set by Thomas Tippl: 1:51.850

=== Coppa Shell Am ===
| Pos | Class | No. | Driver | Team | Laps | Time/Retired | Grid |
|---|---|---|---|---|---|---|---|
| 1 | Am | 199 | (Sweden) Ingvar Mattsson | (Sweden) Scuderia Autoropa | 13 | 30:15.137 | 1 |
| 2 | Am | 186 | (Poland) Agata Smolka | (Italy) Rossocorsa | 13 | +3.184 | 7 |
| 3 | Am | 323 | (United States) John Megrue | (United States) Ferrari of Long Island | 13 | +7.214 | 5 |
| 4 | Am | 136 | (Austria) Alexander Nußbaumer | (Denmark) Formula Racing | 13 | +13.214 | 4 |
| 5 | Am | 549 | (New Zealand) David Dicker | (New Zealand) Continental Cars Auckland | 13 | +16.748 | 6 |
| 6 | Am | 322 | (United States) Brian Simon | (United States) Ferrari of Detroit | 13 | +24.933 | 8 |
| 7 | Am | 500 | (Hong Kong) Evan Mak | (Hong Kong) Denker Group | 13 | +33.698 | 13 |
| 8 | Am | 338 | (United States) Kevin Millstein | (United States) Ferrari of San Diego | 13 | +33.881 | 10 |
| 9 | Am | 172 | (Italy) Giuseppe Ramelli | (Italy) Rossocorsa | 13 | +36.260 | 26 |
| 10 | Am | 593 | (Japan) Koji Iritani | (Japan) Cornes Osaka | 13 | +36.585 | 12 |
| 11 | Am | 304 | (United States) Theodore Giovanis | (United States) Ferrari of Washington | 13 | +42.431 | 16 |
| 12 | Am | 397 | (Ecuador) Roberto Cava | (United States) The Collection | 13 | +43.147 | 20 |
| 13 | Am | 579 | (China) "Jay" Chang | (China) Italia Auto Shanghai | 13 | +43.904 | 18 |
| 14 | Am | 586 | (China) Min Xiao | (China) CTF Beijing | 13 | +54.269 | 14 |
| 15 | Am | 171 | (Denmark) Per Falholt | (Denmark) Formula Racing | 13 | +56.076 | 19 |
| 16 | Am | 511 | (South Korea) "Andrew" Moon | (South Korea) Forza Motors Korea | 13 | +56.425 | 11 |
| 17 | Am | 329 | (United States) James Camp | (United States) Ferrari of South Bay | 13 | +1:27.322 | 22 |
| 18 | Am | 509 | (China) Yan-Sheng Liang | (China) CTF Beijing | 12 | +1 Lap | 25 |
| 19 | Am | 117 | (Czech Republic) Dušan Palcr | (Czech Republic) Scuderia Praha | 12 | +1 Lap | 9 |
| 20 | Am | 599 | (Thailand) Kanthicha Chimsiri | (Thailand) Cavallino Motors Bangkok | 12 | +1 Lap | 24 |
| 21 | Am | 133 | (Turkey) Murat Cuhadaroğlu | (Switzerland) Kessel Racing | 11 | +2 Laps | 2 |
| 22 | Am | 145 | (Belgium) Laurent de Meeus | (United Kingdom) HR Owen | 11 | +2 Laps | 3 |
| 23 | Am | 355 | (United States) Dale Katechis | (United States) Miller Motor Cars | 9 | +4 Laps | 27 |
| 24 | Am | 383 | (United States) Chaz Bruck | (United States) Ferrari of Tampa Bay | 9 | +4 Laps | 17 |
| DNF | Am | 378 | (United States) Alan Hegyi | (United States) Ferrari of Newport Beach | 1 | | 21 |
| DNF | Am | 575 | (Indonesia) Karim Nagadipurna | (Indonesia) Ferrari Jakarta | 1 | | 23 |
| DNS | Am | 311 | (United States) Bradley Smith | (United States) Ferrari of South Bay | 0 | | 15 |
Fastest lap set by Murat Cuhadaroğlu: 1:54.393

== See also ==
- 2018 Ferrari Challenge Europe
- 2018 Ferrari Challenge North America
