= 2018 Ferrari Challenge Europe =

The 2018 Ferrari Challenge Europe was the 26th season of Ferrari Challenge Europe. The season consisted of 7 rounds, starting at the Mugello Circuit on March 24 and ending at the Autodromo Nazionale Monza on November 3.

== Calendar ==
Rnd.	Circuit	Dates	Map
1	(Italy) Mugello Circuit	March 24–25	2018 Ferrari Challenge Europe is located in Europe
2	(United Kingdom) Silverstone Circuit	April 28–29	2018 Ferrari Challenge Europe is located in Europe
3	(Belgium) Circuit de Spa-Francorchamps	May 12–13	2018 Ferrari Challenge Europe is located in Europe
4	(Italy) Misano World Circuit	June 9–10	2018 Ferrari Challenge Europe is located in Europe
5	(Czech Republic) Automotodrom Brno	July 21–22	2018 Ferrari Challenge Europe is located in Europe
6	(Spain) Circuit de Barcelona-Catalunya	September 15–16	2018 Ferrari Challenge Europe is located in Europe
7	(Italy) Autodromo Nazionale Monza	November 2–3	2018 Ferrari Challenge Europe is located in Europe

== Entry list ==
All teams and drivers used the Ferrari 488 Challenge fitted with Pirelli tyres.

=== Trofeo Pirelli ===
Team	No.	Driver	Class	Rounds
(Italy) Rossocorsa	2	(Italy) David Fumanelli	Pro	3–4, 7
(Italy) Rossocorsa	27	(Italy) Alessandro Vezzoni	Pro	All
(Italy) Rossocorsa	85	(Venezuela) Vicente Potolicchio	Pro	1–3, 7
(Italy) Rossocorsa	97	(Italy) Tommaso Rocca	Pro-Am	All
(Denmark) Formula Racing	9	(Denmark) Nicklas Nielsen	Pro	All
(Denmark) Formula Racing	16	(Singapore) Sean Hudspeth	Pro	5–7
(Denmark) Formula Racing	18	(Luxembourg) Olivier Grotz	Pro-Am	6
(Denmark) Formula Racing	44	(Germany) Jens Liebhauser	Pro	All
(Denmark) Formula Racing	60	(Denmark) Johnny Laursen	Pro	4
(Denmark) Formula Racing	61	(United Kingdom) John Dhillon	Pro-Am	All
(Denmark) Formula Racing	80	(Italy) Louis Prette	Pro	7
(Denmark) Formula Racing	89	(Denmark) Claus Zibrandsen	Pro-Am	3, 6
(Czech Republic) Scuderia Praha	11	(Czech Republic) Robert Pergl	Pro-Am	5
(Czech Republic) Scuderia Praha	37	(Czech Republic) Jan Danis	Pro-Am	1, 5
(Sweden) Scuderia Autoropa	13	(Sweden) Martin Nelson	Pro-Am	1–2, 4–7
(Germany) Gohm Motorsport	15	(Germany) Thomas Löfflad	Pro-Am	3
(Germany) Gohm Motorsport	83	(Italy) Germano Salernitano	Pro-Am	6
(United Kingdom) HR Owen	39	(United Kingdom) John Sawbridge	Pro-Am	1–6
(United Kingdom) HR Owen	93	(United Kingdom) Chris Froggatt	Pro-Am	All
(Austria) Baron Motorsport	45	(Denmark) Christian Overgård	Pro-Am	1–4, 6–7
(Austria) Baron Motorsport	88	(Belgium) Florian Merckx	Pro	3
(France) Charles Pozzi	47	(France) Henri Hassid	Pro	1–3, 7
(Germany) Ferrari Eberlein	51	(Germany) Walter-Ben Dörrenberg	Pro-Am	3, 7
(United Kingdom) Ferrari GB	71	(United Kingdom) Pantelis Christoforou	Pro-Am	2–3, 6
(United Kingdom) Ferrari GB	90	(United Kingdom) Jack Brown	Pro-Am	2, 6–7
(Italy) Scuderia Corse Garage Italia	78	(Italy) "Gioga"	Pro-Am	1
(Switzerland) Octane126	81	(Liechtenstein) Fabienne Wohlwend	Pro-Am	All
(Switzerland) Octane126	84	(Germany) Björn Grossmann	Pro	All
(United Kingdom) Stratstone Ferrari	92	(United Kingdom) Sam Smeeth	Pro	1–2, 7

=== Coppa Shell ===
Team	No.	Driver	Class	Rounds
(Denmark) Formula Racing	100	(Denmark) Tina Kok	Am	3
(Denmark) Formula Racing	107	(Japan) Ken Seto	Pro-Am	3
(Denmark) Formula Racing	136	(Austria) Alexander Nußbaumer	Am	All
(Denmark) Formula Racing	157	(Lebanon) Tani Hanna	Pro-Am	3
(Denmark) Formula Racing	168	(Malaysia) David Lim	Am	1–2, 6
(Denmark) Formula Racing	171	(Denmark) Per Falholt	Am	2–3, 5, 7
(Denmark) Formula Racing	198	(Hong Kong) Eric Cheung	Pro-Am	All
(Switzerland) Kessel Racing	102	(Italy) Claudio Schiavoni	Pro-Am	7
(Switzerland) Kessel Racing	133	(Turkey) Murat Cuhadaroğlu	Am	All
(Switzerland) Kessel Racing	177	(Netherlands) Fons Scheltema	Pro-Am	All
(Austria) Baron Motorsport	109	(Austria) Ernst Kirchmayr	Pro-Am	3, 5–7
(Austria) Baron Motorsport	119	(Denmark) Per Nielsen	Am	1–2
(Austria) Baron Motorsport	126	(Denmark) Henrik Kamstrup	Am	1–3, 5
(Austria) Baron Motorsport	127	(Sweden) Thomas Lindroth	Pro-Am	All
(Austria) Baron Motorsport	144	(Czech Republic) Vladimir Hladik	Pro-Am	All
(Switzerland) Octane126	112	(Canada) Rick Lovat	Pro-Am	2–7
(Switzerland) Octane126	197	(Germany) Leonard Winterhalder	Am	4
(Italy) Rossocorsa	116	(United States) Jean-Claude Saada	Pro-Am	1–2
(Italy) Rossocorsa	118	(United States) James Weiland	Pro-Am	3, 5
(Italy) Rossocorsa	172	(Italy) Giuseppe Ramelli	Am	1–2, 4, 7
(Italy) Rossocorsa	186	(Poland) Agata Smolka	Am	All
(Czech Republic) Scuderia Praha	117	(Czech Republic) Dušan Palcr	Am	3–7
(Belgium) Scuderia FMA	120	(Belgium) Guy Fawe	Pro-Am	3, 6–7
(Germany) Gohm Motorsport	128	(Sweden) Christian Kinch	Pro-Am	1–2, 4, 6–7
(United Kingdom) HR Owen	145	(Belgium) Laurent de Meeus	Am	1–5, 7
(Italy) Ineco - MP Racing	161	(Italy) Thomas Gostner	Pro-Am	1–5, 6–7
(Italy) Ineco - MP Racing	173	(Italy) Corinna Gostner	Pro-Am	All
(Italy) Ineco - MP Racing	181	(Italy) Erich Prinoth	Pro-Am	All
(Italy) Ineco - MP Racing	183	(Italy) Manuela Gostner	Pro-Am	All
(Switzerland) Team Zenith Sion - Lausanne	162	(Switzerland) Christophe Hurni	Pro-Am	All
(Italy) CDP	184	(Italy) Maurizio Pitorri	Am	1, 4
(Sweden) Scuderia Autoropa	199	(Sweden) Ingvar Mattsson	Am	All

== Results and standings ==
=== Race results ===
Round	Race	Circuit	Pole position	Fastest lap	Trofeo Pirelli Winners	Coppa Shell Winners
1	1	(Italy) Mugello Circuit	TP Pro: (Denmark) Nicklas Nielsen; TP Pro-Am: (United Kingdom) Chris Froggatt; CS Pro-Am: (United States) Jean-Claude Saada; CS Am: (Poland) Agata Smolka	TP Pro: (Denmark) Nicklas Nielsen; TP Pro-Am: (Liechtenstein) Fabienne Wohlwend; CS Pro-Am: (Italy) Erich Prinoth; CS Am: (Sweden) Ingvar Mattsson	Pro: (Denmark) Nicklas Nielsen; Formula Racing; Pro-Am: (United Kingdom) Chris Froggatt; HR Owen	Pro-Am: (Italy) Erich Prinoth; Ineco - MP Racing; Am: (Sweden) Ingvar Mattsson; Scuderia Autoropa
1	2	(Italy) Mugello Circuit	TP Pro: (Denmark) Nicklas Nielsen; TP Pro-Am: (Czech Republic) Jan Danis; CS Pro-Am: (Italy) Manuela Gostner; CS Am: (Turkey) Murat Cuhadaroğlu	TP Pro: (Germany) Björn Grossmann; TP Pro-Am: (Czech Republic) Jan Danis; CS Pro-Am: (Italy) Erich Prinoth; CS Am: (Turkey) Murat Cuhadaroğlu	Pro: (Denmark) Nicklas Nielsen; Formula Racing; Pro-Am: (Czech Republic) Jan Danis; Scuderia Praha	Pro-Am: (Italy) Erich Prinoth; Ineco - MP Racing; Am: (Turkey) Murat Cuhadaroğlu; Kessel Racing
2	1	(United Kingdom) Silverstone Circuit	TP Pro: (Germany) Björn Grossmann; TP Pro-Am: (United Kingdom) Jack Brown; CS Pro-Am: (United States) Jean-Claude Saada; CS Am: (Austria) Alexander Nußbaumer	TP Pro: (Denmark) Nicklas Nielsen; TP Pro-Am: (United Kingdom) Jack Brown; CS Pro-Am: (Czech Republic) Vladimir Hladik; CS Am: (Turkey) Murat Cuhadaroğlu	Pro: (Germany) Björn Grossmann; Octane126; Pro-Am: (United Kingdom) Chris Froggatt; HR Owen	Pro-Am: (Czech Republic) Vladimir Hladik; Baron Motorsport; Am: (Austria) Alexander Nußbaumer; Formula Racing
2	2	(United Kingdom) Silverstone Circuit	TP Pro: (Germany) Björn Grossmann; TP Pro-Am: (United Kingdom) Jack Brown; CS Pro-Am: (United States) Jean-Claude Saada; CS Am: (Sweden) Ingvar Mattsson	TP Pro: (Denmark) Nicklas Nielsen; TP Pro-Am: (United Kingdom) Chris Froggatt; CS Pro-Am: (Italy) Erich Prinoth; CS Am: (Sweden) Ingvar Mattsson	Pro: (Denmark) Nicklas Nielsen; Formula Racing; Pro-Am: (United Kingdom) Chris Froggatt; HR Owen	Pro-Am: (Switzerland) Christophe Hurni; Team Zenith Sion - Lausanne; Am: (Sweden) Ingvar Mattsson; Scuderia Autoropa
3	1	(Belgium) Circuit de Spa-Francorchamps	TP Pro: (Denmark) Nicklas Nielsen; TP Pro-Am: (United Kingdom) Chris Froggatt; CS Pro-Am: (Hong Kong) Eric Cheung; CS Am: (Austria) Alexander Nußbaumer	TP Pro: (Belgium) Florian Merckx; TP Pro-Am: (United Kingdom) Chris Froggatt; CS Pro-Am: (Hong Kong) Eric Cheung; CS Am: (Turkey) Murat Cuhadaroğlu	Pro: (Belgium) Florian Merckx; Baron Motorsport; Pro-Am: (United Kingdom) Chris Froggatt; HR Owen	Pro-Am: (Hong Kong) Eric Cheung; Formula Racing; Am: (Austria) Alexander Nußbaumer; Formula Racing
3	2	(Belgium) Circuit de Spa-Francorchamps	TP Pro: (Italy) David Fumanelli; TP Pro-Am: (Germany) Thomas Löfflad; CS Pro-Am: (United States) James Weiland; CS Am: (Austria) Alexander Nußbaumer	TP Pro: (Denmark) Nicklas Nielsen; TP Pro-Am: (Denmark) Claus Zibrandsen; CS Pro-Am: (United States) James Weiland; CS Am: (Sweden) Ingvar Mattsson	Pro: (Denmark) Nicklas Nielsen; Formula Racing; Pro-Am: (Liechtenstein) Fabienne Wohlwend; Octane126	Pro-Am: (United States) James Weiland; Rossocorsa; Am: (Sweden) Ingvar Mattsson; Scuderia Autoropa
4	1	(Italy) Misano World Circuit	TP Pro: (Denmark) Nicklas Nielsen; TP Pro-Am: (Liechtenstein) Fabienne Wohlwend; CS Pro-Am: (Italy) Erich Prinoth; CS Am: (Austria) Alexander Nußbaumer	TP Pro: (Denmark) Nicklas Nielsen; TP Pro-Am: (United Kingdom) Chris Froggatt; CS Pro-Am: (Switzerland) Christophe Hurni; CS Am: (Poland) Agata Smolka	Pro: (Denmark) Nicklas Nielsen; Formula Racing; Pro-Am: (Liechtenstein) Fabienne Wohlwend; Octane126	Pro-Am: (Hong Kong) Eric Cheung; Formula Racing; Am: (Italy) Giuseppe Ramelli; Rossocorsa
4	2	(Italy) Misano World Circuit	TP Pro: (Germany) Björn Grossmann; TP Pro-Am: (Liechtenstein) Fabienne Wohlwend; CS Pro-Am: (Hong Kong) Eric Cheung; CS Am: (Italy) Giuseppe Ramelli	TP Pro: (Germany) Björn Grossmann; TP Pro-Am: (Liechtenstein) Fabienne Wohlwend; CS Pro-Am: (Switzerland) Christophe Hurni; CS Am: (Turkey) Murat Cuhadaroğlu	Pro: (Germany) Björn Grossmann; Octane126; Pro-Am: (Liechtenstein) Fabienne Wohlwend; Octane126	Pro-Am: (Hong Kong) Eric Cheung; Formula Racing; Am: (Turkey) Murat Cuhadaroğlu; Kessel Racing
5	1	(Czech Republic) Automotodrom Brno	TP Pro: (Denmark) Nicklas Nielsen; TP Pro-Am: (Czech Republic) Jan Danis; CS Pro-Am: (Italy) Manuela Gostner; CS Am: (Austria) Alexander Nußbaumer	TP Pro: (Denmark) Nicklas Nielsen; TP Pro-Am: (Czech Republic) Jan Danis; CS Pro-Am: (Switzerland) Christophe Hurni; CS Am: (Austria) Alexander Nußbaumer	Pro: (Denmark) Nicklas Nielsen; Formula Racing; Pro-Am: (United Kingdom) Chris Froggatt; HR Owen	Pro-Am: (Switzerland) Christophe Hurni; Team Zenith Sion - Lausanne; Am: (Austria) Alexander Nußbaumer; Formula Racing
5	2	(Czech Republic) Automotodrom Brno	TP Pro: (Denmark) Nicklas Nielsen; TP Pro-Am: (United Kingdom) Chris Froggatt; CS Pro-Am: (Italy) Erich Prinoth; CS Am: (Austria) Alexander Nußbaumer	TP Pro: (Denmark) Nicklas Nielsen; TP Pro-Am: (United Kingdom) Chris Froggatt; CS Pro-Am: (Austria) Ernst Kirchmayr; CS Am: (Austria) Alexander Nußbaumer	Pro: (Denmark) Nicklas Nielsen; Formula Racing; Pro-Am: (United Kingdom) Chris Froggatt; HR Owen	Pro-Am: (Austria) Ernst Kirchmayr; Baron Motorsport; Am: (Austria) Alexander Nußbaumer; Formula Racing
6	1	(Spain) Circuit de Barcelona-Catalunya	TP Pro: (Denmark) Nicklas Nielsen; TP Pro-Am: (United Kingdom) Chris Froggatt; CS Pro-Am: (Switzerland) Christophe Hurni; CS Am: (Turkey) Murat Cuhadaroğlu	TP Pro: (Denmark) Nicklas Nielsen; TP Pro-Am: (United Kingdom) Chris Froggatt; CS Pro-Am: (Switzerland) Christophe Hurni; CS Am: (Turkey) Murat Cuhadaroğlu	Pro: (Denmark) Nicklas Nielsen; Formula Racing; Pro-Am: (United Kingdom) Chris Froggatt; HR Owen	Pro-Am: (Switzerland) Christophe Hurni; Team Zenith Sion - Lausanne; Am: (Austria) Alexander Nußbaumer; Formula Racing
6	2	(Spain) Circuit de Barcelona-Catalunya	TP Pro: (Denmark) Nicklas Nielsen; TP Pro-Am: (United Kingdom) Jack Brown; CS Pro-Am: (Italy) Manuela Gostner; CS Am: (Turkey) Murat Cuhadaroğlu	TP Pro: (Denmark) Nicklas Nielsen; TP Pro-Am: (United Kingdom) Chris Froggatt; CS Pro-Am: (Switzerland) Christophe Hurni; CS Am: (Sweden) Ingvar Mattsson	Pro: (Denmark) Nicklas Nielsen; Formula Racing; Pro-Am: (United Kingdom) Chris Froggatt; HR Owen	Pro-Am: (Italy) Manuela Gostner; Ineco - MP Racing; Am: (Turkey) Murat Cuhadaroğlu; Kessel Racing
7	1	(Italy) Autodromo Nazionale Monza	TP Pro: (Germany) Björn Grossmann; TP Pro-Am: (Liechtenstein) Fabienne Wohlwend; CS Pro-Am: (Switzerland) Christophe Hurni; CS Am: (Sweden) Ingvar Mattsson	TP Pro: (Germany) Björn Grossmann; TP Pro-Am: (United Kingdom) Chris Froggatt; CS Pro-Am: (Netherlands) Fons Scheltema; CS Am: (Sweden) Ingvar Mattsson	Pro: (Denmark) Nicklas Nielsen; Formula Racing; Pro-Am: (United Kingdom) Chris Froggatt; HR Owen	Pro-Am: (Switzerland) Christophe Hurni; Team Zenith Sion - Lausanne; Am: (Belgium) Laurent de Meeus; HR Owen
7	2	(Italy) Autodromo Nazionale Monza	TP Pro: (Italy) Louis Prette; TP Pro-Am: (Liechtenstein) Fabienne Wohlwend; CS Pro-Am: (Italy) Manuela Gostner; CS Am: (Belgium) Laurent de Meeus	TP Pro: (Denmark) Nicklas Nielsen; TP Pro-Am: (Liechtenstein) Fabienne Wohlwend; CS Pro-Am: (Italy) Thomas Gostner; CS Am: (Czech Republic) Dušan Palcr	Pro: (Italy) David Fumanelli; Rossocorsa; Pro-Am: (United Kingdom) Chris Froggatt; HR Owen	Pro-Am: (Italy) Manuela Gostner; Ineco - MP Racing; Am: (Turkey) Murat Cuhadaroğlu; Kessel Racing

=== Championship standings ===
Points were awarded to the top ten classified finishers as follows:

Race Position	1st	2nd	3rd	4th	5th	6th	7th	8th	9th or lower	Pole	FLap	Entry
Points	20	15	12	10	8	6	4	2	1	1	1	1

Trofeo Pirelli

Pos.	Driver	(Italy) MUG		(United Kingdom) SIL		(Belgium) SPA		(Italy) MIS		(Czech Republic) BRN		(Spain) BAR		(Italy) MNZ		Points
Pos.	Driver	R1	R2	R1	R2	R1	R2	R1	R2	R1	R2	R1	R2	R1	R2	Points
Pro Class
1	(Denmark) Nicklas Nielsen	1	1	2	1	3	1	1	2	1	1	1	1	1	2	282
2	(Germany) Björn Grossmann	2	2	1	2	2	2	3	1	4	2	2	2	5	3	216
3	(Germany) Jens Liebhauser	5	4	7	7	6	4	5	4	3	3	3	3	2	5	137
4	(Italy) Alessandro Vezzoni	4	3	5	5	7	6	Ret	5	5	Ret	4	Ret	Ret	8	84
5	(France) Henri Hassid	3	5	6	3	4	7							8	7	63
6	(Italy) David Fumanelli					Ret	Ret	2	6					6	1	51
7	(Venezuela) Vicente Potolicchio	6	6	3	6	5	5							9	DNS	50
8	(United Kingdom) Sam Smeeth	7	7	4	4									7	6	39
9	(Singapore) Sean Hudspeth									2	Ret	Ret	4	4	Ret	38
10	(Belgium) Florian Merckx					1	3									34
11	(Italy) Louis Prette													3	4	24
12	(Denmark) Johnny Laursen							4	3							23
Pro-Am Class
1	(United Kingdom) Chris Froggatt	1	2	1	1	1	4	2	2	1	1	1	1	1	1	273
2	(Liechtenstein) Fabienne Wohlwend	3	3	3	2	8	1	1	1	3	3	9	2	5	Ret	142
3	(Sweden) Martin Nelson	4	4	4	4			4	Ret	4	4	10	5	3	6	111
4	(Italy) Tommaso Rocca	7	8	9	5	6	6	3	4	7	5	5	3	Ret	5	104
5	(United Kingdom) John Sawbridge	6	5	5	7	2	3	6	5	5	6	Ret	6			103
6	(Denmark) Christian Overgård	5	7	6	6	Ret	5	7	3			4	9	6	3	90
7	(United Kingdom) Jack Brown			2	3							2	Ret	2	2	82
8	(United Kingdom) John Dhillon	9	9	7	8	5	Ret	5	Ret	6	Ret	6	7	4	4	75
9	(Czech Republic) Jan Danis	2	1							2	Ret					57
10	(Denmark) Claus Zibrandsen					3	2					3	4			52
11	(United Kingdom) Pantelis Christoforou			8	9	4	Ret					7	8			27
12	(Czech Republic) Robert Pergl									Ret	2					16
13	(Italy) "Gioga"	8	6													13
14	(Germany) Walter-Ben Dörrenberg					7	7							7	7	9
15	(Italy) Germano Salernitano											8	10			5
16	(Germany) Thomas Löfflad					Ret	Ret									2
17	(Luxembourg) Olivier Grotz											Ret	Ret			1

Coppa Shell

Pos.	Driver	(Italy) MUG		(United Kingdom) SIL		(Belgium) SPA		(Italy) MIS		(Czech Republic) BRN		(Spain) BAR		(Italy) MNZ		Points
Pos.	Driver	R1	R2	R1	R2	R1	R2	R1	R2	R1	R2	R1	R2	R1	R2	Points
Pro-Am Class
1	(Switzerland) Christophe Hurni	10	7	4	1	2	2	6	2	1	Ret	1	2	1	6	173.5
2	(Hong Kong) Eric Cheung	7	5	5	5	1	3	1	1	4	2	4	Ret	2	4	164
3	(Italy) Manuela Gostner	5	11	3	7	5	5	2	Ret	2	5	2	1	Ret	1	140
4	(Italy) Erich Prinoth	1	1	7	2	8	4	4	DNS	3	6	11	Ret	8	3	124
5	(Czech Republic) Vladimir Hladik	6	4	1	3	Ret	DNS	3	Ret	6	3	5	4	10	9	107
6	(Netherlands) Fons Scheltema	8	6	2	Ret	4	8	10	Ret	7	4	3	5	4	10	89.5
7	(Sweden) Christian Kinch	4	8	8	6			5	3			7	7	3	8	70
8	(Italy) Thomas Gostner	3	3	6	4	3	9	Ret	Ret			Ret	6	9	11	68
9	(Austria) Ernst Kirchmayr					7	6			DNS	1	6	DNS	7	2	57
10	(Italy) Corinna Gostner	9	9	12	8	9	13	7	Ret	10	8	8	8	11	5	38
11	(United States) Jean-Claude Saada	2	2	9	Ret											36
12	(Canada) Rick Lovat			11	Ret	10	Ret	8	Ret	5	10	Ret	3	DNS	Ret	31
13	(Sweden) Thomas Lindroth	11	10	10	9	Ret	12	9	4	9	9	10	9	12	13	30
14	(United States) James Weiland					Ret	1			8	7					21
15	(Belgium) Guy Fawe					11	10					9	Ret	5	7	17.5
16	(Lebanon) Tani Hanna					6	7									9
17	(Italy) Claudio Schiavoni													6	12	7
18	(Japan) Ken Seto					12	11									1
Am Class
1	(Turkey) Murat Cuhadaroğlu	3	1	4	Ret	3	3	2	1	2	5	2	1	2	1	208
2	(Sweden) Ingvar Mattsson	1	8	2	1	4	1	4	3	3	4	Ret	4	4	3	171
3	(Austria) Alexander Nußbaumer	Ret	7	1	2	1	8	3	Ret	1	1	1	2	Ret	6	170.5
4	(Poland) Agata Smolka	5	2	9	4	2	2	6	Ret	5	2	Ret	DNS	6	2	116.5
5	(Czech Republic) Dušan Palcr					9	DNS	7	2	4	3	3	3	3	4	95
6	(Italy) Giuseppe Ramelli	2	3	3	3			1	Ret					5	Ret	74
7	(Belgium) Laurent de Meeus	7	5	Ret	DNS	5	5	8	DNS	6	7			1	5	73
8	(Denmark) Henrik Kamstrup	6	6	6	7	7	7			7	8					40
9	(Denmark) Per Nielsen	4	4	5	5											38
10	(Denmark) Per Falholt			7	6	6	6			8	6			DNS	7	36
11	(Malaysia) David Lim	8	Ret	8	8							4	5			32
12	(Germany) Leonard Winterhalder							9	4							13
13	(Italy) Maurizio Pitorri	Ret	DNS					5	DNS							10
14	(Denmark) Tina Kok					8	4									9

== See also ==
- 2018 Finali Mondiali
