= 2017 Ferrari Challenge Europe =

The 2017 Ferrari Challenge Europe was the 25th season of Ferrari Challenge Europe. The season consisted of 7 rounds, starting at the Circuit Ricardo Tormo on May 20 and ending at the Mugello Circuit on October 28.

Fabienne Wohlwend became the first woman to win any Ferrari Challenge race in class or outright with her victory in the second Coppa Shell race at Imola.

== Calendar ==
Rnd.	Circuit	Dates	Map
1	(Spain) Circuit Ricardo Tormo	May 20–21	2017 Ferrari Challenge Europe is located in Europe
2	(Italy) Autodromo Nazionale di Monza	June 10–11	2017 Ferrari Challenge Europe is located in Europe
3	(Hungary) Hungaroring	June 24–25	2017 Ferrari Challenge Europe is located in Europe
4	(France) Circuit Paul Ricard	July 22–23	2017 Ferrari Challenge Europe is located in Europe
5	(United Kingdom) Silverstone Circuit	September 23–24	2017 Ferrari Challenge Europe is located in Europe
6	(Italy) Autodromo Enzo e Dino Ferrari	October 7–8	2017 Ferrari Challenge Europe is located in Europe
7	(Italy) Mugello Circuit	October 27–28	2017 Ferrari Challenge Europe is located in Europe

== Entry list ==
All teams and drivers used the Ferrari 488 Challenge fitted with Pirelli tyres.

=== Trofeo Pirelli ===
Team	No.	Driver	Class	Rounds
(Switzerland) Octane126	1	(Germany) Björn Grossmann	Pro	1, 3–7
(Switzerland) Octane126	8	(Switzerland) Fabio Leimer	Pro	1–3, 7
(Denmark) Formula Racing	11	(Denmark) Nicklas Nielsen	Pro	7
(Austria) Baron Service	19	(Denmark) Per Nielsen	Pro-Am	All
(Austria) Baron Service	45	(Denmark) Christian Overgård	Pro-Am	All
(Austria) Baron Service	82	(Denmark) Palle Kjærsgård	Pro-Am	1–2, 5, 7
(Italy) CDP	20	(Italy) Andrea Gagliardini	Pro	1–4
(Italy) CDP	25	(Italy) Daniele di Amato	Pro	2–6
(Italy) CDP	69	(Italy) Marco Zanasi	Pro	7
(Italy) Rossocorsa	23	(Italy) "Greg B."	Pro-Am	1
(Italy) Rossocorsa	27	(Italy) Alessandro Vezzoni	Pro	All
(Italy) Rossocorsa	91	(Austria) Philipp Baron	Pro	All
(Italy) Rossocorsa	97	(Italy) Tommaso Rocca	Pro-Am	All
(Germany) Gohm Motorsport	26	(Austria) Alexander Nußbaumer	Pro-Am	7
(Germany) Gohm Motorsport	44	(Germany) Jens Liebhauser	Pro-Am	All
(Germany) Gohm Motorsport	47	(Austria) Gerald Aubock	Pro-Am	3
(Germany) Gohm Motorsport	51	(Germany) Thomas Löfflad	Pro-Am	2
(Hungary) Ferrari Budapest	30	(Canada) Joshua Cartu	Pro-Am	All
(Switzerland) Kessel Racing	42	(Canada) Marc Muzzo	Pro-Am	4
(Switzerland) Kessel Racing	43	(Italy) Ettore Contini	Pro-Am	3–4, 6
(Switzerland) Kessel Racing	48	(Turkey) Volkan Ekinci	Pro-Am	5
(Italy) Ineco – MP Racing	50	(Italy) David Gostner	Pro	4
(Sweden) Scuderia Autoropa	70	(Sweden) Martin Nelson	Pro-Am	All
(Sweden) Scuderia Autoropa	72	(Sweden) Mats Tidstrand	Pro-Am	1, 4
(Sweden) Scuderia Autoropa	73	(Sweden) Robin Jensen	Pro-Am	1–4, 6–7
(United Kingdom) Graypaul Nottingham	80	(United Kingdom) Marc Brough	Pro-Am	1–2, 6–7
(United Kingdom) Stratstone Ferrari	81	(United Kingdom) Bonamy Grimes	Pro-Am	5–7
(United Kingdom) Stratstone Ferrari	92	(United Kingdom) Sam Smeeth	Pro	All
(United Kingdom) HR Owen	93	(United Kingdom) Chris Froggatt	Pro-Am	All

=== Coppa Shell ===
Team	No.	Driver	Class	Rounds
(Denmark) Formula Racing	100	(Denmark) Tina Kok	Am	All
(Denmark) Formula Racing	125	(Japan) Tadakazu Kojima	Am	5–6
(Denmark) Formula Racing	157	(Lebanon) Tani Hanna	Am	1–2, 7
(Denmark) Formula Racing	160	(Denmark) Johnny Laursen	Am	All
(Denmark) Formula Racing	168	(Malaysia) David Lim	Am	1–2, 4–7
(Denmark) Formula Racing	171	(Denmark) Per Falholt	Am	2, 7
(Denmark) Formula Racing	198	(Hong Kong) Eric Cheung	Am	All
(Switzerland) Octane126	101	(Liechtenstein) Fabienne Wohlwend	Am	2, 6–7
(Switzerland) Kessel Racing	102	(Italy) Claudio Schiavoni	Am	1–2, 4–7
(Switzerland) Kessel Racing	108	(France) Deborah Mayer	Am	1–2, 4
(Switzerland) Kessel Racing	112	(Canada) Rick Lovat	Am	1–5
(Switzerland) Kessel Racing	126	(Denmark) Henrik Kamstrup	Am	3–4, 6–7
(Switzerland) Kessel Racing	133	(Turkey) Murat Cuhadaroğlu	Am	1–2, 4, 6–7
(Switzerland) Kessel Racing	177	(Netherlands) Fons Scheltema	Am	All
(Switzerland) Kessel Racing	178	(Switzerland) Peter Görke	Am	1–2
(Czech Republic) Scuderia Praha	117	(Czech Republic) Dušan Palcr	Am	2–3, 7
(Italy) Rossocorsa	118	(United States) James Weiland	Am	3–7
(Italy) Rossocorsa	193	(United States) Alan Hegyi	Am	4
(Germany) Penske Sportwagen Hamburg	127	(Sweden) Thomas Lindroth	Am	All
(Germany) Gohm Motorsport	128	(Sweden) Christian Kinch	Am	1–2, 5–7
(Germany) Gohm Motorsport	169	(Austria) Karl Oppitzhauser	Am	2, 6
(Austria) Baron Service	144	(Czech Republic) Vladimir Hladik	Am	All
(United Kingdom) HR Owen	145	(Belgium) Laurent de Meeus	Am	5–7
(France) Charles Pozzi	147	(France) Henri Hassid	Am	2, 4–7
(Italy) Ineco – MP Racing	161	(Italy) Thomas Gostner	Am	All
(Italy) Ineco – MP Racing	181	(Italy) Erich Prinoth	Am	All
(Italy) Ineco – MP Racing	183	(Italy) Manuela Gostner	Am	1, 3–7
(Switzerland) Team Zenith Sion – Lausanne	162	(Switzerland) Christophe Hurni	Am	All
(Sweden) Scuderia Autoropa	199	(Sweden) Ingvar Mattsson	Am	1–2, 4–7

== Results and standings ==
=== Race results ===
Round	Race	Circuit	Pole position	Fastest lap	Trofeo Pirelli Winners	Coppa Shell Winners
1	1	(Spain) Circuit Ricardo Tormo	TP Pro: (Germany) Björn Grossmann; TP Pro-Am: (United Kingdom) Chris Froggatt; CS Am: (Denmark) Johnny Laursen	TP Pro: (Italy) Andrea Gagliardini; TP Pro-Am: (Germany) Jens Liebhauser; CS Am: (Hong Kong) Eric Cheung	Pro: (Switzerland) Fabio Leimer; Octane126; Pro-Am: (Sweden) Martin Nelson; Scuderia Autoropa	Am: (Denmark) Johnny Laursen; Formula Racing
1	2	(Spain) Circuit Ricardo Tormo	TP Pro: (Germany) Björn Grossmann; TP Pro-Am: (United Kingdom) Chris Froggatt; CS Am: (Canada) Rick Lovat	TP Pro: (Germany) Björn Grossmann; TP Pro-Am: (Canada) Joshua Cartu; CS Am: (Canada) Rick Lovat	Pro: (Germany) Björn Grossmann; Octane126; Pro-Am: (Sweden) Martin Nelson; Scuderia Autoropa	Am: (Canada) Rick Lovat; Kessel Racing
2	1	(Italy) Autodromo Nazionale di Monza	TP Pro: (Italy) Daniele di Amato; TP Pro-Am: (Sweden) Martin Nelson; CS Am: (Denmark) Johnny Laursen	TP Pro: (Italy) Daniele di Amato; TP Pro-Am: (Italy) Tommaso Rocca; CS Am: (Hong Kong) Eric Cheung	Pro: (Italy) Daniele di Amato; CDP; Pro-Am: (Sweden) Martin Nelson; Scuderia Autoropa	Am: (Italy) Erich Prinoth; Ineco – MP Racing
2	2	(Italy) Autodromo Nazionale di Monza	TP Pro: (Italy) Daniele di Amato; TP Pro-Am: (Germany) Jens Liebhauser; CS Am: (Netherlands) Fons Scheltema	TP Pro: (Italy) Daniele di Amato; TP Pro-Am: (Germany) Jens Liebhauser; CS Am: (France) Henri Hassid	Pro: (Italy) Daniele di Amato; CDP; Pro-Am: (Sweden) Martin Nelson; Scuderia Autoropa	Am: (France) Henri Hassid; Charles Pozzi
3	1	(Hungary) Hungaroring	TP Pro: (Italy) Daniele di Amato; TP Pro-Am: (Sweden) Martin Nelson; CS Am: (Denmark) Johnny Laursen	TP Pro: (Italy) Daniele di Amato; TP Pro-Am: (Germany) Jens Liebhauser; CS Am: (Hong Kong) Eric Cheung	Pro: (Italy) Daniele di Amato; CDP; Pro-Am: (Germany) Jens Liebhauser; Gohm Motorsport	Am: (Hong Kong) Eric Cheung; Formula Racing
3	2	(Hungary) Hungaroring	TP Pro: (Italy) Daniele di Amato; TP Pro-Am: (Sweden) Martin Nelson; CS Am: (Denmark) Johnny Laursen	TP Pro: (Italy) Daniele di Amato; TP Pro-Am: (United Kingdom) Chris Froggatt; CS Am: (Italy) Thomas Gostner	Pro: (Italy) Daniele di Amato; CDP; Pro-Am: (United Kingdom) Chris Froggatt; HR Owen	Am: (Denmark) Johnny Laursen; Formula Racing
4	1	(France) Circuit Paul Ricard	TP Pro: (Italy) Daniele di Amato; TP Pro-Am: (Italy) Tommaso Rocca; CS Am: (Denmark) Johnny Laursen	TP Pro: (Italy) Daniele di Amato; TP Pro-Am: (Italy) Tommaso Rocca; CS Am: (France) Henri Hassid	Pro: (Italy) Daniele di Amato; CDP; Pro-Am: (Italy) Tommaso Rocca; Rossocorsa	Am: (France) Henri Hassid; Charles Pozzi
4	2	(France) Circuit Paul Ricard	TP Pro: (Italy) Daniele di Amato; TP Pro-Am: (Germany) Jens Liebhauser; CS Am: (Denmark) Johnny Laursen	TP Pro: (Italy) Daniele di Amato; TP Pro-Am: (Germany) Jens Liebhauser; CS Am: (France) Henri Hassid	Pro: (Germany) Björn Grossmann; Octane126; Pro-Am: (Germany) Jens Liebhauser; Gohm Motorsport	Am: (France) Henri Hassid; Charles Pozzi
5	1	(United Kingdom) Silverstone Circuit	TP Pro: (Italy) Daniele di Amato; TP Pro-Am: (United Kingdom) Chris Froggatt; CS Am: (France) Henri Hassid	TP Pro: (Italy) Daniele di Amato; TP Pro-Am: (United Kingdom) Chris Froggatt; CS Am: (France) Henri Hassid	Pro: (Italy) Daniele di Amato; CDP; Pro-Am: (United Kingdom) Chris Froggatt; HR Owen	Am: (France) Henri Hassid; Charles Pozzi
5	2	(United Kingdom) Silverstone Circuit	TP Pro: (Austria) Philipp Baron; TP Pro-Am: (United Kingdom) Chris Froggatt; CS Am: (France) Henri Hassid	TP Pro: (Italy) Daniele di Amato; TP Pro-Am: (Denmark) Christian Overgård; CS Am: (Denmark) Johnny Laursen	Pro: (Austria) Philipp Baron; Rossocorsa; Pro-Am: (United Kingdom) Chris Froggatt; HR Owen	Am: (France) Henri Hassid; Charles Pozzi
6	1	(Italy) Autodromo Enzo e Dino Ferrari	TP Pro: (Germany) Björn Grossmann; TP Pro-Am: (Germany) Jens Liebhauser; CS Am: (France) Henri Hassid	TP Pro: (Austria) Philipp Baron; TP Pro-Am: (United Kingdom) Chris Froggatt; CS Am: (France) Henri Hassid	Pro: (Germany) Björn Grossmann; Octane126; Pro-Am: (Sweden) Martin Nelson; Scuderia Autoropa	Am: (France) Henri Hassid; Charles Pozzi
6	2	(Italy) Autodromo Enzo e Dino Ferrari	TP Pro: (Germany) Björn Grossmann; TP Pro-Am: (Germany) Jens Liebhauser; CS Am: (Liechtenstein) Fabienne Wohlwend	TP Pro: (Italy) Daniele di Amato; TP Pro-Am: (Germany) Jens Liebhauser; CS Am: (France) Henri Hassid	Pro: (United Kingdom) Sam Smeeth; Stratstone Ferrari; Pro-Am: (Germany) Jens Liebhauser; Gohm Motorsport	Am: (Liechtenstein) Fabienne Wohlwend; Octane126
7	1	(Italy) Mugello Circuit	TP Pro: (Denmark) Nicklas Nielsen; TP Pro-Am: (Germany) Jens Liebhauser; CS Am: (France) Henri Hassid	TP Pro: (Denmark) Nicklas Nielsen; TP Pro-Am: (Germany) Jens Liebhauser; CS Am: (France) Henri Hassid	Pro: (Denmark) Nicklas Nielsen; Formula Racing; Pro-Am: (Germany) Jens Liebhauser; Gohm Motorsport	Am: (Denmark) Johnny Laursen; Formula Racing
7	2	(Italy) Mugello Circuit	TP Pro: (Denmark) Nicklas Nielsen; TP Pro-Am: (Germany) Jens Liebhauser; CS Am: (Liechtenstein) Fabienne Wohlwend	TP Pro: (Switzerland) Fabio Leimer; TP Pro-Am: (Germany) Jens Liebhauser; CS Am: (France) Henri Hassid	Pro: (Denmark) Nicklas Nielsen; Formula Racing; Pro-Am: (Germany) Jens Liebhauser; Gohm Motorsport	Am: (France) Henri Hassid; Charles Pozzi

=== Championship standings ===
Points were awarded to the top ten classified finishers as follows:

Race Position	1st	2nd	3rd	4th	5th	6th	7th	8th	9th or lower	Pole	FLap	Entry
Points	20	15	12	10	8	6	4	2	1	1	1	1

Trofeo Pirelli

Pos.	Driver	(Spain) VAL		(Italy) MNZ		(Hungary) BUD		(France) LEC		(United Kingdom) SIL		(Italy) IMO		(Italy) MUG		Points
Pos.	Driver	R1	R2	R1	R2	R1	R2	R1	R2	R1	R2	R1	R2	R1	R2	Points
Pro Class
1	(Italy) Daniele di Amato			1	1	1	1	1	2	1	2	3	4			193
2	(United Kingdom) Sam Smeeth	4	6	2	5	2	5	4	3	5	5	2	1	5	4	155
3	(Austria) Philipp Baron	2	4	4	2	5	6	2	6	2	1	4	Ret	3	Ret	151
4	(Germany) Björn Grossmann	3	1			DNS	DNS	3	1	3	3	1	3	4	3	147
5	(Italy) Alessandro Vezzoni	5	5	3	4	3	3	6	4	4	4	Ret	2	6	5	130
6	(Switzerland) Fabio Leimer	1	2	6	3	4	2							2	2	105.5
7	(Italy) Andrea Gagliardini	Ret	3	5	Ret	6	4	5	5							58
8	(Denmark) Nicklas Nielsen													1	1	34
9	(Italy) Marco Zanasi													7	6	8
10	(Italy) David Gostner							DNS	DNS							2
Pro-Am Class
1	(Germany) Jens Liebhauser	3	3	3	3	1	2	3	1	2	2	9	1	1	1	217
2	(Sweden) Martin Nelson	1	1	1	1	8	5	10	5	7	Ret	1	2	2	3	178
3	(United Kingdom) Chris Froggatt	2	2	Ret	6	9	1	2	2	1	1	2	3	Ret	2	177.5
4	(Italy) Tommaso Rocca	4	5	2	2	Ret	8	1	6	5	5	6	7	5	9	120
5	(Denmark) Christian Overgård	9	8	5	7	2	4	6	7	3	3	8	10	4	6	98
6	(Canada) Joshua Cartu	6	4	7	4	6	3	7	9	4	6	7	5	9	5	94
7	(Sweden) Robin Jensen	10	6	Ret	8	4	7	11	8			5	6	3	7	61
8	(United Kingdom) Bonamy Grimes									6	4	4	4	8	4	45
9	(United Kingdom) Marc Brough	5	7	Ret	5							3	9	10	8	40.5
=	(Denmark) Per Nielsen	11	10	6	9	7	9	9	11	DNS	8	10	8	6	10	40.5
11	(Italy) Ettore Contini					5	6	5	3			Ret	DNS			37
12	(Canada) Marc Muzzo							4	4							21
13	(Austria) Gerald Aubock					3	Ret									13
14	(Sweden) Mats Tidstrand	8	9					8	10							11
=	(Germany) Thomas Löfflad			4	Ret											11
16	(Denmark) Palle Kjærsgård	12	Ret	8	10					8	Ret			11	11	10
17	(Turkey) Volkan Ekinci									9	7					6
18	(Italy) "Greg B."	7	11													5
=	(Austria) Alexander Nußbaumer													7	Ret	5

Coppa Shell

Pos.	Driver	(Spain) VAL		(Italy) MNZ		(Hungary) BUD		(France) LEC		(United Kingdom) SIL		(Italy) IMO		(Italy) MUG		Points
Pos.	Driver	R1	R2	R1	R2	R1	R2	R1	R2	R1	R2	R1	R2	R1	R2	Points
Am Class
1	(Denmark) Johnny Laursen	1	2	4	4	2	1	2	2	2	Ret	3	3	1	3	199
2	(France) Henri Hassid			Ret	1			1	1	1	1	1	2	10	1	163
3	(Hong Kong) Eric Cheung	3	4	3	5	1	6	3	Ret	10	Ret	11	9	5	9	102
=	(Switzerland) Christophe Hurni	5	DSQ	2	3	5	10	10	3	4	3	9	16	4	5	102
5	(Italy) Erich Prinoth	8	7	1	Ret	11	3	4	Ret	9	2	7	7	2	20	97
=	(Netherlands) Fons Scheltema	7	6	6	2	Ret	4	6	4	5	5	6	4	19	Ret	97
7	(Canada) Rick Lovat	2	1	8	7	3	7	5	15	17	15					73
8	(Liechtenstein) Fabienne Wohlwend			5	Ret							2	1	3	2	67.5
9	(Czech Republic) Vladimir Hladik	6	5	7	10	6	Ret	Ret	5	6	DNS	8	8	Ret	12	52
10	(Italy) Thomas Gostner	15	13	Ret	DNS	4	2	12	10	13	8	5	6	15	10	51.5
11	(Italy) Manuela Gostner	13	9			7	Ret	7	6	12	9	4	5	Ret	4	47
12	(United States) James Weiland					8	5	11	7	3	10	Ret	12	6	8	40.5
13	(Lebanon) Tani Hanna	12	3	Ret	6									13	7	23
14	(Turkey) Murat Cuhadaroğlu	9	14	9	Ret			9	8			19	10	7	6	22
15	(Italy) Claudio Schiavoni	4	8	11	15			17	9	11	Ret	12	19	17	13	21
16	(Sweden) Christian Kinch	10	10	Ret	DNS					8	6	10	11	8	Ret	20
17	(Sweden) Thomas Lindroth	18	11	10	8	10	9	8	11	Ret	11	13	14	12	14	17
18	(Japan) Tadakazu Kojima									7	4	20	13			16
19	(Sweden) Ingvar Mattsson	11	12	15	Ret			DNS	DNS	14	7	17	15	9	11	12
20	(Czech Republic) Dušan Palcr			14	11	9	8							11	Ret	8
21	(Denmark) Tina Kok	17	17	16	12	12	11	13	12	18	13	16	17	14	15	7
22	(Malaysia) David Lim	19	18	17	13			16	14	16	14	18	20	20	17	6
23	(France) Deborah Mayer	14	16	13	9			14	DNS							5
24	(Denmark) Henrik Kamstrup					13	12	15	13			15	18	16	16	4
25	(Belgium) Laurent de Meeus									15	12	14	21	18	18	3
26	(Denmark) Per Falholt			19	DNS									21	19	2
=	(Switzerland) Peter Görke	16	15	12	Ret											2
=	(Austria) Karl Oppitzhauser			18	14							DNS	22			2
29	(United States) Alan Hegyi							18	16							1

== See also ==
- 2017 Finali Mondiali
