= 2017 Finali Mondiali =

(Italy) 2017 Finali Mondiali
Event Information
- Date: 26–29 October
- Location: Scarperia e San Piero, Tuscany, Italy
- Venue: Mugello Circuit
- Weather: Overcast

Results
Race 1
Distance	15 laps	78.675 km
Winner	(Switzerland) Fabio Leimer; Octane126	31:14.732
Race 2
Distance	15 laps	78.675 km
Winner	(Germany) Jens Liebhauser; Formula Racing	31:42.334
Race 3
Distance	14 laps	73.430 km
Winner	(Denmark) Johnny Laursen; Formula Racing	30:54.881
Race 4
Distance	15 laps	78.675 km
Winner	(United States) Joseph Rubbo; Ferrari of Long Island	30:52.874

The 2017 Finali Mondiali was the 2017 edition of the season-ending event for all Ferrari Challenge championships. Held at the Mugello Circuit in Italy as part of the biennial event contracting, the event saw drivers from the Asia-Pacific, European and North American championships take part.

This is the last year in which a 458 Challenge race was held, and would be replaced in 2018 with a Coppa Shell Pro-Am race.

== Classification ==
=== Trofeo Pirelli ===
Pos	Class	No.	Driver	Team	Laps	Time/Retired	Grid
1	Pro	8	(Switzerland) Fabio Leimer	(Switzerland) Octane126	15	31:14.732	1
2	Pro	1	(Germany) Björn Grossmann	(Switzerland) Octane126	15	+3.150	2
3	Pro	92	(United Kingdom) Sam Smeeth	(United Kingdom) Stratstone Ferrari	15	+15.062	8
4	Pro	111	(United States) Peter Ludwig	(United States) Wide World Motors	15	+24.552	7
5	Pro	199	(Canada) Wei Lu	(Canada) Ferrari of Vancouver	15	+25.792	9
6	Pro	107	(Mexico) Martin Fuentes	(United States) Ferrari of Silicon Valley	15	+26.092	10
7	Pro-Am	44	(Germany) Jens Liebhauser	(Denmark) Formula Racing	15	+27.602	4
8	Pro-Am	113	(Canada) Marc Muzzo	(Canada) Ferrari of Ontario	15	+35.773	16
9	Pro-Am	70	(Sweden) Martin Nelson	(Sweden) Scuderia Autoropa	15	+41.321	17
10	Pro	224	(Japan) "Go Max"	(Japan) M Auto Hiroshima	15	+41.637	14
11	Pro-Am	30	(Canada) Joshua Cartu	(Hungary) Ferrari Budapest	15	+42.547	17
12	Pro-Am	119	(United States) Christopher Cagnazzi	(United States) Ferrari of Long Island	15	+47.348	19
13	Pro-Am	212	(Philippines) Angie King	(Philippines) Autostrada Motore Manila	15	+48.101	20
14	Pro-Am	97	(Italy) Tommaso Rocca	(Italy) Rossocorsa	15	+56.799	24
15	Pro-Am	93	(United Kingdom) Chris Froggatt	(United Kingdom) HR Owen	15	+57.979	13
16	Pro	204	(Italy) Philippe Prette	Ferrari Hong Kong	15	+59.346	11
17	Pro	248	(Italy) Angelo Negro	(China) Italia Auto Shanghai	15	+59.367	18
18	Pro-Am	80	(United Kingdom) Marc Brough	(United Kingdom) Graypaul Nottingham	15	+1:01.961	23
19	Pro-Am	268	(China) Yan-Bin Xing	(China) CTF Beijing	15	+1:03.338	27
20	Pro-Am	19	(Denmark) Per Nielsen	(Austria) Baron Service	15	+1:03.938	29
21	Pro-Am	116	(Canada) Frank Selldorff	(United States) Boardwalk Ferrari	15	+1:09.750	28
22	Pro-Am	207	(Japan) Ken Seto	(Japan) Rosso Scuderia	15	+1:12.317	30
23	Pro-Am	73	(Sweden) Robin Jensen	(Austria) Baron Service	15	+1:14.653	26
24	Pro-Am	82	(Denmark) Palle Kjærsgård	(Austria) Baron Service	14	+1 Lap	31
25	Pro	91	(Austria) Philipp Baron	(Italy) Rossocorsa	12	+3 Laps	3
26	Pro	170	(United States) Cooper MacNeil	(United States) Ferrari of Silicon Valley	11	+4 Laps	5
DNF	Pro	27	(Italy) Alessandro Vezzoni	(Italy) Rossocorsa	9		6
DNF	Pro-Am	45	(Denmark) Christian Overgård	(Austria) Baron Service	8		21
DNF	Pro-Am	288	(Chinese Taipei) "Tiger" Wu	(Chinese Taipei) Modena Motori Taiwan	1		22
DNS	Pro-Am	114	(United States) Brent Holden	(United States) Ferrari of Newport Beach	0		25
DNS	Pro	239	(China) Hui-Lin Han	(China) CTF Beijing	0		12
Fastest lap set by Fabio Leimer: 1:51.770

=== Coppa Shell ===
Pos	Class	No.	Driver	Team	Laps	Time/Retired	Grid
1	Am	360	(Denmark) Johnny Laursen	(Denmark) Formula Racing	14	30:54.881	2
2	Am	347	(France) Henri Hassid	(France) Charles Pozzi	14	+0.294	1
3	Am	301	(Liechtenstein) Fabienne Wohlwend	(Switzerland) Octane126	14	+3.338	3
4	Am	526	(Japan) Tadakazu Kojima	(Japan) Rosso Scuderia	14	+4.692	8
5	Am	381	(Italy) Erich Prinoth	(Italy) Ineco - MP Racing	14	+7.289	5
6	Am	383	(Italy) Manuela Gostner	(Italy) Ineco - MP Racing	14	+8.007	4
7	Am	362	(Switzerland) Christophe Hurni	(Switzerland) Team Zenith Sion - Lausanne	14	+8.911	6
8	Am	399	(Sweden) Ingvar Mattsson	(Sweden) Scuderia Autoropa	14	+11.225	10
9	Am	377	(Netherlands) Fons Scheltema	(Switzerland) Kessel Racing	14	+15.687	16
10	Am	361	(Italy) Thomas Gostner	(Italy) Ineco - MP Racing	14	+16.454	12
11	Am	318	(United States) James Weiland	(Italy) Rossocorsa	14	+17.371	13
12	Am	513	(Japan) Makoto Fujiwara	(Japan) Cornes Tokyo	14	+18.141	21
13	Am	333	(Turkey) Murat Cuhadaroğlu	(Switzerland) Kessel Racing	14	+18.564	18
14	Am	328	(Sweden) Christian Kinch	(Germany) Gohm Motorsport	14	+22.962	15
15	Am	433	(Republic of Ireland) Michael Fassbender	(United States) Ferrari North America	14	+23.151	20
16	Am	528	(Hong Kong) "Charles" Chan	Ferrari Hong Kong	14	+26.404	14
17	Am	300	(Denmark) Tina Kok	(Denmark) Formula Racing	14	+29.349	26
18	Am	500	(Hong Kong) "Evan" Mak	(China) Denker Guangzhou	14	+32.299	30
19	Am	326	(Denmark) Henrik Kamstrup	(Austria) Baron Service	14	+32.963	33
20	Am	345	(Belgium) Laurent de Meeus	(United Kingdom) HR Owen	14	+35.866	31
21	Am	317	(Czech Republic) Dušan Palcr	(Czech Republic) Scuderia Praha	14	+36.312	25
22	Am	415	(Canada) Murray Rothlander	(Canada) Ferrari of Vancouver	14	+36.459	41
23	Am	568	(China) Liang-Bo Yao	(China) CTF Beijing	14	+38.094	34
24	Am	557	(South Korea) "Andrew" Moon	(South Korea) Forza Motors Korea	14	+40.328	28
25	Am	344	(Czech Republic) Vladimir Hladik	(Austria) Baron Service	14	+41.227	11
26	Am	558	(Chinese Taipei) "Kent" Chen	(Chinese Taipei) Modena Motori Taiwan	14	+41.982	32
27	Am	527	(New Zealand) Grant Baker	(New Zealand) Continental Cars Auckland	14	+42.090	27
28	Am	499	(Canada) Barry Zekelman	(Canada) Ferrari of Ontario	14	+43.690	7
29	Am	523	(Japan) Hideo Honda	(Japan) Cornes Nagoya	14	+44.531	36
30	Am	517	(China) Xi Wang	(China) Li Jun Hang Wuhan	14	+56.427	38
31	Am	368	(Malaysia) David Lim	(Denmark) Formula Racing	14	+56.917	35
32	Am	426	(United States) Robert Picerne	(United States) Ferrari of Central Florida	14	+57.365	37
33	Am	327	(Sweden) Thomas Lindroth	(Germany) Penske Sportwagen Hamburg	14	+59.606	24
34	Am	404	(United States) David Musial	(United States) Lake Forest Sportscars	14	+59.653	22
35	Am	599	(Thailand) Kamthicha Chimsiri	(Thailand) Cavallino Motors Bangkok	14	+1:03.532	39
36	Am	575	(Indonesia) Karim Nagadipurna	(Indonesia) Ferrari Jakarta	13	+1 Lap	40
DSQ	Am	508	(China) Eric Zhang	(China) Denker Guangzhou	14	+23.360	17
DNF	Am	493	(Chile) Osvaldo Gaio	(United States) Miller Motor Cars	7		23
DNF	Am	411	(United States) Karl Williams	(United States) Ferrari of Beverly Hills	6		9
DNF	Am	302	(Italy) Claudio Schiavoni	(Switzerland) Kessel Racing	1		19
DNS	Am	549	(New Zealand) David Dicker	(New Zealand) Continental Cars Auckland	0		29
Fastest lap set by Henri Hassid: 1:53.417

=== 458 Challenge ===
Pos	Class	No.	Driver	Team	Laps	Time/Retired	Grid
1	458	728	(United States) Joseph Rubbo	(United States) Ferrari of Long Island	15	30:52.874	1
2	458	888	(Australia) Martin Berry	Italia Auto Singapore	15	+1.114	3
3	458	642	(Turkey) Galip Atar	(Switzerland) Octane126	15	+2.085	5
4	458	709	(Mexico) Oscar Parades-Arroyo	(United States) Ferrari Westlake	15	+3.722	8
5	458	812	(China) "Sky" Chen	(Japan) Cornes Osaka	15	+8.214	11
6	458	836	(Hong Kong) Sam Lok	Ferrari Hong Kong	15	+9.113	12
7	458	807	(Hong Kong) "James" Wong	Ferrari Hong Kong	15	+10.877	16
8	458	727	(United States) Lisa Clark	(United States) Ferrari of Beverly Hills	15	+13.266	15
9	458	822	(Japan) Tamotsu Kondo	(Japan) Auto Cavallino Kobe	15	+13.477	9
10	458	622	(Germany) Holger Harmsen	(Germany) Lüg Sportivo	15	+27.524	7
11	458	764	(United States) Naveen Rao	(United States) Ferrari of San Diego	15	+27.730	2
12	458	811	(Hong Kong) "Paul" Wong	Ferrari Hong Kong	15	+32.920	10
13	458	722	(Mexico) Luis Perusquia	(United States) Ferrari of Tampa Bay	15	+36.870	17
14	458	886	(China) Min Xiao	(China) CTF Beijing	15	+40.936	14
15	458	769	(United States) Kresimir Penavić	(United States) Ferrari of Long Island	15	+58.716	18
DNF	458	771	(United States) Brian Kaminskey	(United States) Ferrari of Long Island	11		13
DNF	458	708	(United States) John Boyd	(United States) Ferrari of Denver	9		4
DNS	458	703	(Puerto Rico) Francesco Piovanetti	(United States) Ferrari of Fort Lauderdale	0		6
Fastest lap set by Joseph Rubbo: 1:55.481

== See also ==
- 2017 Ferrari Challenge Europe
