= 2020 Ferrari Challenge Europe =

The 2020–21 Ferrari Challenge Europe was the 28th season of Ferrari Challenge Europe and its predecessor Ferrari Challenge Italy. The season consists of 7 rounds, starting at the Autodromo Enzo e Dino Ferrari on 4 July 2020 and ending at the Misano World Circuit on 7 March 2021.

Michelle Gatting became the first woman to win a race outright in the Pro Class of the Trofeo Pirelli across all Ferrari Challenge championships worldwide in the first race of the sixth round at Misano.

== Calendar ==
Rnd.	Circuit	Dates	Map
1	(Italy) Autodromo Enzo e Dino Ferrari	4–5 July 2020	2020 Ferrari Challenge Europe is located in Europe
2	(Spain) Circuit de Barcelona-Catalunya	18–19 July 2020	2020 Ferrari Challenge Europe is located in Europe
3	(Portugal) Algarve International Circuit	1–2 August 2020	2020 Ferrari Challenge Europe is located in Europe
4	(Italy) Mugello Circuit	29–30 August 2020	2020 Ferrari Challenge Europe is located in Europe
5	(Belgium) Circuit de Spa-Francorchamps	12–13 September 2020	2020 Ferrari Challenge Europe is located in Europe
6	(Italy) Misano World Circuit	26–27 September 2020	2020 Ferrari Challenge Europe is located in Europe
7	(Italy) Misano World Circuit	4–7 March 2021	2020 Ferrari Challenge Europe is located in Europe
Cancelled due to the COVID-19 pandemic			2020 Ferrari Challenge Europe is located in Europe
	(Czech Republic) Brno Circuit	5–7 June 2020	2020 Ferrari Challenge Europe is located in Europe
	(Germany) Hockenheimring	19–21 June 2020	2020 Ferrari Challenge Europe is located in Europe
	(United Arab Emirates) Yas Marina Circuit	4–7 November 2020	2020 Ferrari Challenge Europe is located in Europe

== Entry list ==
All teams and drivers used the Ferrari 488 Challenge Evo fitted with Pirelli tyres.

=== Trofeo Pirelli ===
Team	No.	Driver	Class	Rounds
(Denmark) Formula Racing	4	(Denmark) Christian Brunsborg	Pro-Am	7
(Denmark) Formula Racing	87	(Luxembourg) Olivier Grotz	Pro-Am	1–6
(Denmark) Formula Racing	94	(Belgium) John Wartique	Pro	3–7
(Denmark) Formula Racing	98	(Denmark) Frederik Paulsen	Pro-Am	All
(Switzerland) Octane126	5	(Liechtenstein) Fabienne Wohlwend	Pro	1–5, 7
(Switzerland) Octane126	73	(Poland) Roman Ziemian	Pro-Am	1–6
(France) Charles Pozzi	6	(France) Thomas Neubauer	Pro	1–2, 7
(Switzerland) Kessel Racing	8	(Switzerland) Nicolò Rosi	Pro-Am	4, 6–7
(Switzerland) Kessel Racing	9	(Italy) Alessandro Cutrera	Pro-Am	6
(Switzerland) Kessel Racing	10	(Italy) Leonardo Maria del Vecchio	Pro-Am	6
(Switzerland) Kessel Racing	11	(Italy) Marco Talarico	Pro-Am	6
(Switzerland) Kessel Racing	23	(Germany) Tim Kohmann	Pro	6
(Italy) Rossocorsa	22	(Venezuela) Vicente Potolicchio	Pro-Am	6
(Italy) Rossocorsa	25	(Italy) Alessandro Cozzi	Pro-Am	1, 4–7
(Italy) Rossocorsa	27	(Italy) Marco Pulcini	Pro-Am	7
(Italy) Rossocorsa	33	(Italy) Emanuele-Maria Tabacchi	Pro	All
(Italy) Rossocorsa	97	(Italy) Tommaso Rocca	Pro-Am	7
(Austria) Baron Motorsport	45	(Denmark) Christian Overgård	Pro-Am	5–6
(Austria) Baron Motorsport	65	(Denmark) Frederik Espersen	Pro-Am	2–6
(Austria) Baron Motorsport	88	(Belgium) Florian Merckx	Pro	3–7
(Italy) CDP - MP Racing	50	(Italy) David Gostner	Pro-Am	1, 3–4, 6–7
(Czech Republic) Scuderia Praha	56	(Slovakia) Matúš Vyboh	Pro-Am	All
(United Kingdom) Graypaul Nottingham	61	(United Kingdom) John Dhillon	Pro-Am	1–5, 7
(Italy) (Switzerland) Iron Lynx – Scuderia Niki Hasler	83	(Denmark) Michelle Gatting	Pro	1, 6
(Germany) Riller und Schnauck	85	(Germany) Hanno Laskowski	Pro-Am	2–4, 6–7

=== Coppa Shell ===
Team	No.	Driver	Class	Rounds
(Italy) Sa.Mo.Car	101	(Italy) Paolo Scudieri	Pro-Am	1, 4, 6
(Italy) (Switzerland) Iron Lynx – Scuderia Niki Hasler	102	(Italy) Claudio Schiavoni	Pro-Am	1, 6–7
(Denmark) Formula Racing	103	(Germany) "Boris Gideon"	Am	All
(Denmark) Formula Racing	128	(Sweden) Christian Kinch	Pro-Am	4–7
(Austria) Baron Motorsport	109	(Austria) Ernst Kirchmayr	Pro-Am	All
(Austria) Baron Motorsport	123	(Denmark) Peter Christensen	Am	5
(Austria) Baron Motorsport	190	(Austria) Michael Simoncić	Am	All
(Czech Republic) Scuderia Praha	117	(Czech Republic) Dušan Palcr	Am	1–2, 4–5
(Czech Republic) Scuderia Praha	122	(Slovakia) Miroslav Vyboh	Am	All
(Italy) Rossocorsa	118	(United States) James Weiland	Pro-Am	2, 5
(Italy) Rossocorsa	172	(Italy) Giuseppe Ramelli	Am	1, 4, 6–7
(Belgium) Scuderia FMA	120	(Belgium) Guy Fawe	Pro-Am	4–5
(Sweden) Scuderia Autoropa	126	(Sweden) Joakim Olander	Am	7
(Switzerland) Kessel Racing	133	(Turkey) Murat Cuhadaroğlu	Pro-Am	4
(Switzerland) Kessel Racing	177	(Netherlands) Fons Scheltema	Pro-Am	All
(Switzerland) Kessel Racing	181	(Switzerland) Matteo Lualdi	Pro-Am	4, 6–7
(France) SF Grand Est Mulhouse	139	(France) "Alex Fox"	Am	All
(Germany) Moll Sportwagen Hannover	150	(Germany) Werner Genter	Am	1, 3–7
(United Kingdom) HR Owen	155	(Belgium) Laurent de Meeus	Am	1–3, 5–6
(Germany) Scuderia Gohm	159	(Germany) Matthias Moser	Am	1–2, 4–5, 7
(Germany) Scuderia Gohm	167	(Germany) Jörg Kamper	Pro-Am	5
(Italy) CDP - MP Racing	161	(Italy) Thomas Gostner	Pro-Am	1, 3–4, 6–7
(Italy) CDP - MP Racing	173	(Italy) Corinna Gostner	Pro-Am	1, 3–4, 6–7
(Germany) Penske Sportwagen Hamburg	166	(Germany) Ernst-Albert Berg	Pro-Am	5
(Germany) Lüg Sportivo	178	(Germany) Axel Sartingen	Pro-Am	1, 3–4, 6–7
(Monaco) Scuderia Monte Carlo	182	(Netherlands) Willem van der Vorm	Am	All
(Netherlands) Kroymans Automotive	188	(Netherlands) Roger Grouwels	Pro-Am	All

== Results and standings ==
=== Race results ===
Round	Race	Circuit	Pole position	Fastest lap	Trofeo Pirelli Winners	Coppa Shell Winners
1	1	(Italy) Autodromo Enzo e Dino Ferrari	TP Pro: (Liechtenstein) Fabienne Wohlwend; TP Pro-Am: (Denmark) Frederik Paulsen; CS Pro-Am: (Italy) Thomas Gostner; CS Am: (Austria) Michael Simoncić	TP Pro: (Italy) Emanuele-Maria Tabacchi; TP Pro-Am: (Denmark) Frederik Paulsen; CS Pro-Am: (Italy) Corinna Gostner; CS Am: (Austria) Michael Simoncić	Pro: (Italy) Emanuele-Maria Tabacchi; Rossocorsa; Pro-Am: (Slovakia) Matúš Vyboh; Scuderia Praha	Pro-Am: (Netherlands) Roger Grouwels; Kroymans Automotive; Am: (Austria) Michael Simoncić; Baron Motorsport
1	2	(Italy) Autodromo Enzo e Dino Ferrari	TP Pro: (Italy) Emanuele-Maria Tabacchi; TP Pro-Am: (Slovakia) Matúš Vyboh; CS Pro-Am: (Italy) Thomas Gostner; CS Am: (Austria) Michael Simoncić	TP Pro: (Italy) Emanuele-Maria Tabacchi; TP Pro-Am: (Slovakia) Matúš Vyboh; CS Pro-Am: (Austria) Ernst Kirchmayr; CS Am: (Austria) Michael Simoncić	Pro: (Italy) Emanuele-Maria Tabacchi; Rossocorsa; Pro-Am: (Slovakia) Matúš Vyboh; Scuderia Praha	Pro-Am: (Austria) Ernst Kirchmayr; Baron Motorsport; Am: (Austria) Michael Simoncić; Baron Motorsport
2	1	(Spain) Circuit de Catalunya	TP Pro: (France) Thomas Neubauer; TP Pro-Am: (Denmark) Frederik Paulsen; CS Pro-Am: (United States) James Weiland; CS Am: (Netherlands) Willem van der Vorm	TP Pro: (France) Thomas Neubauer; TP Pro-Am: (Luxembourg) Olivier Grotz; CS Pro-Am: (Netherlands) Roger Grouwels; CS Am: (Germany) "Boris Gideon"	Pro: (France) Thomas Neubauer; Charles Pozzi; Pro-Am: (Slovakia) Matúš Vyboh; Scuderia Praha	Pro-Am: (United States) James Weiland; Rossocorsa; Am: (Czech Republic) Dušan Palcr; Scuderia Praha
2	2	(Spain) Circuit de Catalunya	TP Pro: (France) Thomas Neubauer; TP Pro-Am: (Denmark) Frederik Paulsen; CS Pro-Am: (Austria) Ernst Kirchmayr; CS Am: (France) "Alex Fox"	TP Pro: (Italy) Emanuele-Maria Tabacchi; TP Pro-Am: (Slovakia) Matúš Vyboh; CS Pro-Am: (Netherlands) Roger Grouwels; CS Am: (France) "Alex Fox"	Pro: (France) Thomas Neubauer; Charles Pozzi; Pro-Am: (Denmark) Frederik Paulsen; Formula Racing	Pro-Am: (Netherlands) Roger Grouwels; Kroymans Automotive; Am: (France) "Alex Fox"; SF Grand Est Mulhouse
3	1	(Portugal) Algarve International Circuit	TP Pro: (Italy) Emanuele-Maria Tabacchi; TP Pro-Am: (Slovakia) Matúš Vyboh; CS Pro-Am: (Austria) Ernst Kirchmayr; CS Am: (Belgium) Laurent de Meeus	TP Pro: (Italy) Emanuele-Maria Tabacchi; TP Pro-Am: (Slovakia) Matúš Vyboh; CS Pro-Am: (Italy) Thomas Gostner; CS Am: (Belgium) Laurent de Meeus	Pro: (Belgium) John Wartique; Formula Racing; Pro-Am: (Luxembourg) Olivier Grotz; Formula Racing	Pro-Am: (Netherlands) Roger Grouwels; Kroymans Automotive; Am: (France) "Alex Fox"; SF Grand Est Mulhouse
3	2	(Portugal) Algarve International Circuit	TP Pro: (Italy) Emanuele-Maria Tabacchi; TP Pro-Am: (Denmark) Frederik Paulsen; CS Pro-Am: (Netherlands) Roger Grouwels; CS Am: (France) "Alex Fox"	TP Pro: (Italy) Emanuele-Maria Tabacchi; TP Pro-Am: (Slovakia) Matúš Vyboh; CS Pro-Am: (Austria) Ernst Kirchmayr; CS Am: (Belgium) Laurent de Meeus	Pro: (Italy) Emanuele-Maria Tabacchi; Rossocorsa; Pro-Am: (Denmark) Frederik Paulsen; Formula Racing	Pro-Am: (Netherlands) Roger Grouwels; Kroymans Automotive; Am: (Germany) "Boris Gideon"; Formula Racing
4	1	(Italy) Mugello Circuit	TP Pro: (Liechtenstein) Fabienne Wohlwend; TP Pro-Am: (Denmark) Frederik Paulsen; CS Pro-Am: (Austria) Ernst Kirchmayr; CS Am: (France) "Alex Fox"	TP Pro: (Italy) Emanuele-Maria Tabacchi; TP Pro-Am: (Denmark) Frederik Paulsen; CS Pro-Am: (Netherlands) Roger Grouwels; CS Am: (Austria) Michael Simoncić	Pro: (Italy) Emanuele-Maria Tabacchi; Rossocorsa; Pro-Am: (Denmark) Frederik Paulsen; Formula Racing	Pro-Am: (Austria) Ernst Kirchmayr; Baron Motorsport; Am: (Italy) Giuseppe Ramelli; Rossocorsa
4	2	(Italy) Mugello Circuit	TP Pro: (Liechtenstein) Fabienne Wohlwend; TP Pro-Am: (Denmark) Frederik Espersen; CS Pro-Am: (Netherlands) Fons Scheltema; CS Am: (Austria) Michael Simoncić	TP Pro: (Italy) Emanuele-Maria Tabacchi; TP Pro-Am: (Slovakia) Matúš Vyboh; CS Pro-Am: (Netherlands) Fons Scheltema; CS Am: (France) "Alex Fox"	Pro: (Italy) Emanuele-Maria Tabacchi; Rossocorsa; Pro-Am: (Slovakia) Matúš Vyboh; Scuderia Praha	Pro-Am: (Netherlands) Fons Scheltema; Kessel Racing; Am: (France) "Alex Fox"; SF Grand Est Mulhouse
5	1	(Belgium) Circuit de Spa-Francorchamps	TP Pro: (Italy) Emanuele-Maria Tabacchi; TP Pro-Am: (Denmark) Frederik Paulsen; CS Pro-Am: (Germany) Ernst-Albert Berg; CS Am: (Austria) Michael Simoncić	TP Pro: (Italy) Emanuele-Maria Tabacchi; TP Pro-Am: (Slovakia) Matúš Vyboh; CS Pro-Am: (Netherlands) Roger Grouwels; CS Am: (Austria) Michael Simoncić	Pro: (Italy) Emanuele-Maria Tabacchi; Rossocorsa; Pro-Am: (Denmark) Frederik Paulsen; Formula Racing	Pro-Am: (Netherlands) Roger Grouwels; Kroymans Automotive; Am: (Austria) Michael Simoncić; Baron Motorsport
5	2	(Belgium) Circuit de Spa-Francorchamps	TP Pro: (Italy) Emanuele-Maria Tabacchi; TP Pro-Am: (Denmark) Frederik Paulsen; CS Pro-Am: (Germany) Ernst-Albert Berg; CS Am: (Austria) Michael Simoncić	TP Pro: (Italy) Emanuele-Maria Tabacchi; TP Pro-Am: (Slovakia) Matúš Vyboh; CS Pro-Am: (Germany) Ernst-Albert Berg; CS Am: (Germany) "Boris Gideon"	Pro: (Italy) Emanuele-Maria Tabacchi; Rossocorsa; Pro-Am: (Denmark) Frederik Paulsen; Formula Racing	Pro-Am: (Germany) Ernst-Albert Berg; Penske Sportwagen Hamburg; Am: (Germany) "Boris Gideon"; Formula Racing
6	1	(Italy) Misano World Circuit	TP Pro: (Denmark) Michelle Gatting; TP Pro-Am: (Denmark) Frederik Paulsen; CS Pro-Am: (Austria) Ernst Kirchmayr; CS Am: (Belgium) Laurent de Meeus	TP Pro: (Italy) Emanuele-Maria Tabacchi; TP Pro-Am: (Luxembourg) Olivier Grotz; CS Pro-Am: (Austria) Ernst Kirchmayr; CS Am: (Netherlands) Willem van der Vorm	Pro: (Denmark) Michelle Gatting; Iron Lynx – Scuderia Niki Hasler; Pro-Am: (Denmark) Frederik Paulsen; Formula Racing	Pro-Am: (Netherlands) Roger Grouwels; Kroymans Automotive; Am: (Belgium) Laurent de Meeus; HR Owen
6	2	(Italy) Misano World Circuit	TP Pro: (Denmark) Michelle Gatting; TP Pro-Am: (Denmark) Frederik Paulsen; CS Pro-Am: (Sweden) Christian Kinch; CS Am: (France) "Alex Fox"	TP Pro: (Italy) Emanuele-Maria Tabacchi; TP Pro-Am: (Denmark) Frederik Espersen; CS Pro-Am: (Austria) Ernst Kirchmayr; CS Am: (Austria) Michael Simoncić	Pro: (Italy) Emanuele-Maria Tabacchi; Rossocorsa; Pro-Am: (Denmark) Frederik Paulsen; Formula Racing	Pro-Am: (Netherlands) Roger Grouwels; Kroymans Automotive; Am: (France) "Alex Fox"; SF Grand Est Mulhouse
7	1	(Italy) Misano World Circuit	TP Pro: (France) Thomas Neubauer; TP Pro-Am: (Denmark) Frederik Paulsen; CS Pro-Am: (Austria) Ernst Kirchmayr; CS Am: (Germany) "Boris Gideon"	TP Pro: (France) Thomas Neubauer; TP Pro-Am: (Denmark) Frederik Paulsen; CS Pro-Am: (Netherlands) Roger Grouwels; CS Am: (Germany) "Boris Gideon"	Pro: (Liechtenstein) Fabienne Wohlwend; Octane126; Pro-Am: (Denmark) Frederik Paulsen; Formula Racing	Pro-Am: (Austria) Ernst Kirchmayr; Baron Motorsport; Am: (Germany) "Boris Gideon"; Formula Racing
7	2	(Italy) Misano World Circuit	TP Pro: (France) Thomas Neubauer; TP Pro-Am: (Denmark) Christian Brunsborg; CS Pro-Am: (Netherlands) Roger Grouwels; CS Am: (Germany) "Boris Gideon"	TP Pro: (France) Thomas Neubauer; TP Pro-Am: (Denmark) Christian Brunsborg; CS Pro-Am: (Austria) Ernst Kirchmayr; CS Am: (Sweden) Joakim Olander	Pro: (France) Thomas Neubauer; Charles Pozzi; Pro-Am: (Denmark) Christian Brunsborg; Formula Racing	Pro-Am: (Netherlands) Roger Grouwels; Kroymans Automotive; Am: (France) "Alex Fox"; SF Grand Est Mulhouse

=== Championship standings ===
Points were awarded to the top ten classified finishers as follows:

Race Position	1st	2nd	3rd	4th	5th	6th	7th	8th or lower	Pole	FLap	Entry
Points	15	12	10	8	6	4	2	1	1	1	1

Trofeo Pirelli

Pos.	Driver	(Italy) IMO		(Spain) BCN		(Portugal) ALG		(Italy) MUG		(Belgium) SPA		(Italy) MIS1		(Italy) MIS2		Points
Pos.	Driver	R1	R2	R1	R2	R1	R2	R1	R2	R1	R2	R1	R2	R1	R2	Points
Pro Class
1	(Italy) Emanuele-Maria Tabacchi	1	1	2	2	3	1	1	1	1	1	2	1	3	4	207
2	(Liechtenstein) Fabienne Wohlwend	3	2	3	3	2	2	2	2	4	DNS	WD	WD	1	3	132
3	(Belgium) John Wartique					1	3	4	4	2	3	DNS	DNS	2	2	92
4	(Belgium) Florian Merckx					Ret	4	3	3	3	2	3	4	DNS	5	81
5	(France) Thomas Neubauer	Ret	3	1	1									4	1	73
6	(Denmark) Michelle Gatting	2	4									1	2			51
7	(Germany) Tim Kohmann											4	3			19
Pro-Am Class
1	(Denmark) Frederik Paulsen	2	2	2	1	3	1	1	3	1	1	1	1	1	Ret	196
2	(Slovakia) Matúš Vyboh	1	1	1	4	2	4	2	1	2	2	Ret	4	2	2	172
3	(Luxembourg) Olivier Grotz	3	3	3	3	1	3	DNS	4	3	Ret	2	3			113
4	(Denmark) Frederik Espersen			4	2	4	2	3	2	Ret	3	Ret	7			81
5	(Poland) Roman Ziemian	5	5	6	6	DNS	DNS	4	6	5	5	4	8			59
6	(Italy) Alessandro Cozzi	4	4					6	Ret	4	4	5	Ret	7	8	50
7	(United Kingdom) John Dhillon			5	5	5	Ret	Ret	Ret	DNS	DNS			4	4	39
8	(Germany) Hanno Laskowski			7	7	6	5	5	Ret			7	9	5	7	38
9	(Denmark) Christian Brunsborg													3	1	28
10	(Venezuela) Vicente Potolicchio											3	2			23
11	(Switzerland) Nicolò Rosi							7	5			6	12	Ret	5	22
12	(Italy) Tommaso Rocca													6	3	15
13	(Italy) David Gostner	DNS	DNS			DNS	DNS	DNS	7			DNS	6	DNS		11
14	(Denmark) Christian Overgård									DNS	DNS	Ret	5			8
15	(Italy) Marco Pulcini													Ret	7	3
16	(Italy) Alessandro Cutrera											Ret	10			2
=	(Italy) Marco Talarico											Ret	11			2
–	(Italy) Leonardo-Maria del Vecchio											Ret	Ret			1

Coppa Shell

Pos.	Driver	(Italy) IMO		(Spain) BCN		(Portugal) ALG		(Italy) MUG		(Belgium) SPA		(Italy) MIS1		(Italy) MIS2		Points
Pos.	Driver	R1	R2	R1	R2	R1	R2	R1	R2	R1	R2	R1	R2	R1	R2	Points
Pro-Am Class
1	(Netherlands) Roger Grouwels	1	4	2	1	1	1	2	3	1	2	1	1	2	1	201
2	(Austria) Ernst Kirchmayr	2	1	4	3	Ret	2	1	4	7	DNS	2	2	1	2	168
3	(Netherlands) Fons Scheltema	3	2	3	4	3	4	3	1	4	5	4	Ret	6	4	126
4	(Germany) Axel Sartingen	4	3			2	5	8	5			8	Ret	3	3	69
5	(Sweden) Christian Kinch							4	7	3	4	3	3	4	5	67
6	(Italy) Thomas Gostner	DNS	Ret			4	6	5	2			5	6	5	6	58
7	(United States) James Weiland			1	2					2	3					52
8	(Italy) Corinna Gostner	Ret	6			5	3	Ret	6			7	5	7	7	42
9	(Italy) Claudio Schiavoni	5	Ret									6	4			20
10	(Germany) Ernst-Albert Berg									Ret	1					19
11	(Belgium) Guy Fawe							6	8	5	7					15
12	(Italy) Paolo Scudieri	6	5					DNS	DNS			Ret	DNS			13
13	(Germany) Jörg Kamper									6	6					9
14	(Switzerland) Matteo Lualdi							7	Ret			9	7			7
–	(Turkey) Murat Cuhadaroğlu							Ret	DNS							1
Am Class
1	(France) "Alex Fox"	2	3	4	1	1	3	2	1	2	4	2	1	3	1	182
2	(Austria) Michael Simoncić	1	1	8	5	2	Ret	6	5	1	5	3	2	2	3	141
3	(Germany) "Boris Gideon"	6	4	2	3	3	1	Ret	DNS	4	1	Ret	DNS	1	Ret	109
4	(Belgium) Laurent de Meeus	5	2	6	2	7	2			Ret	2	1	Ret			84
5	(Netherlands) Willem van der Vorm	7	6	3	6	5	4	DNS	DNS	3	6	7	6	4	2	83
6	(Slovakia) Miroslav Vyboh	Ret	7	7	7	4	Ret	4	2	6	7	5	4	5	4	75
7	(Germany) Matthias Moser	4	5	5	4			Ret	3	5	3					58
8	(Germany) Werner Genter	8	8			6	5	5	4	7	8	6	5	6	5	55
9	(Czech Republic) Dušan Palcr	3	DNS	1	DNS			3	DNS	DNS	DNS					39
10	(Italy) Giuseppe Ramelli	DNS	Ret					1	Ret			4	3			36
11	(Sweden) Joakim Olander													Ret	6	6
–	(Denmark) Peter Christensen									DNS	DNS					1
