= John Wartique =

Belgian racing driver

- Nationality: Belgian
- Born: 25 June 1990 (age 36) Seraing, Wallonia, Belgium

GP3 Series
- Categorisation: FIA Silver
- Years active: 2012
- Teams: Atech CRS Grand Prix
- Starts: 10
- Wins: 0
- Poles: 0
- Fastest laps: 0
- Best finish: 25th in 2012

John Wartique (born 25 June 1990 in Seraing) is a racing driver from Belgium. He currently competes in the European Ferrari Challenge, having previously raced in the GP3 Series.

== Racing record ==
=== Career summary ===
Season	Series	Team	Races	Wins	Poles	F/Laps	Podiums	Points	Position
2012	GP3 Series	Atech CRS Grand Prix	10	0	0	0	0	0	25th
2016	Porsche Supercup	MRS Cup-Racing	2	0	0	0	0	4	25th
2016	Porsche Supercup	MRS GT-Racing	1	0	0	0	0	4	25th
2019	Ferrari Challenge Europe - Trofeo Pirelli (Pro)	Rossocorsa	1	0	0	0	0	13	12th
2020–21	Ferrari Challenge Europe - Trofeo Pirelli (Pro)	Formula Racing	8	1	0	0	4	92	**3rd**
2021	Ferrari Challenge Europe - Trofeo Pirelli (Pro)	Francorchamps Motors Luxembourg	13	1	0	1	6	109	4th
2021	Finali Mondiali - Trofeo Pirelli (Pro)	Francorchamps Motors Luxembourg	1	0	0	0	0	N/A	4th
2021	GT World Challenge Europe Endurance Cup	AF Corse							
2021	Intercontinental GT Challenge	AF Corse	1	0	0	0	0	0	NC
2022	Ferrari Challenge Europe - Trofeo Pirelli (Pro)	Francorchamps Motors Luxembourg							
2024	World Rally Championship-2								

=== Complete GP3 Series results ===
(key) (Races in bold indicate pole position) (Races in italics indicate fastest lap)

Year	Entrant	1	2	3	4	5	6	7	8	9	10	11	12	13	14	15	16	D.C.	Points
2012	Atech CRS Grand Prix	CAT; FEA; 21	CAT; SPR; 13	MCO; FEA; 17	MCO; SPR; 13	VAL; FEA; 12	VAL; SPR; Ret	SIL; FEA	SIL; SPR	HOC; FEA	HOC; SPR	HUN; FEA	HUN; SPR	SPA; FEA; 23	SPA; SPR; 17	MNZ; FEA; 17	MNZ; SPR; 18	25th	0

=== Ferrari Challenge Finali Mondiali results ===
Year	Class	Team	Car	Circuit	Pos.
2021	**Trofeo Pirelli Pro**	(Denmark) Formula Racing	Ferrari 488 Challenge Evo	(Italy) Misano World Circuit	4th

=== Complete 24 Hours of Spa results ===
Year	Team	Co-Drivers	Car	Class	Laps	Ovr. Pos.	Class Pos.
2021	(Italy) AF Corse	(Italy) Andrea Bertolini (Belgium) Louis Machiels (Italy) Alessio Rovera	Ferrari 488 GT3 Evo	Pro-Am	549	17th	**2nd**
