= Christophe Hurni =

Swiss racing driver

- Nationality: Swiss
- Born: 1 December 1962 (age 63)

GP3 Series career
- Debut season: 2011
- Current team: Jenzer Motorsport
- Car number: 9
- Starts: 2
- Wins: 0
- Poles: 0
- Fastest laps: 0
- Best finish: 36th in 2011

Christophe Hurni (born 1 December 1962, Switzerland) is a Swiss racing driver.

== Biography ==
Hurni started racing at the age of 21, competing in the Volant Elf talent search at Circuit Paul Ricard in 1983 and making the finals alongside Jean Alesi and eventual winner Éric Bernard. After a short stint in karting, he moved into Formula 3, contesting mainly the Swiss championship but also various events across Europe (most notably in Monaco). Hurni then bounced around Renault Clio Cup Switzerland, Formula 3000 and Porsche Carrera Cup throughout the 1990s before stepping away from driving to focus on running his Sports Promotion team.

Hurni returned to racing in 2003, entering the Swiss Formula Renault 2.0 series for the best part of a decade before gaining notoriety competing in the final round of the 2011 GP3 Series at Monza at the age of 48, making him the oldest driver to have ever raced in a (Formula One-sanctioned) GP2/GP3 race weekend. The following year he entered a previous-generation Formula Renault 3.5 car into BOSS GP, before turning back to Formula Renault 2.0 in the form of V de V Challenge Monoplace.

In 2017, Hurni switched to GT racing and contested the European Ferrari Challenge. Contesting the amateur Coppa Shell championship, he finished third in 2017 before winning the 2018 championship and Ferrari World Finals.

== Career results ==
=== Career summary ===
Season	Series	Team	Races	Wins	Poles	F/Laps	Podiums	Points	Position
1987	FIA European Formula 3 Cup	Ecurie des 3 Chevrons	1	0	0	0	0	N/A	20th
1989	FIA European Formula 3 Cup	Christophe Hurni	1	0	0	0	0	N/A	DNF
1990	Swiss Formula 3 Championship		?	?	?	?	?	98	4th
2005	Formula Renault 2.0 Switzerland		5	0	0	0	0	37	11th
2008	Formula Renault 2.0 Switzerland	Sports Promotion	2	0	0	0	0	0	NC
2010	Formula Renault 2.0 Middle European Championship	Ecurie des 3 Chevrons	2	0	0	0	0	20	13th
2010	Formula Renault 2.0 Middle European Championship	Sports Promotion	2	0	0	0	0	20	13th
2011	GP3 Series	Jenzer Motorsport	2	0	0	0	0	0	36th
2012	BOSS GP Series		2	0	0	0	1	12	14th
2013	V de V Challenge Monoplace	Sports Promotion	6	0	0	0	1	150	16th
2014	V de V Challenge Monoplace	Sports Promotion	6	0	0	0	0	146	21st
2015	V de V Challenge Monoplace	Sports Promotion	14	0	0	0	0	277	8th
2016	V de V Challenge Monoplace	Sports Promotion	21	0	0	0	0	437	9th
2017	Ferrari Challenge Europe - Coppa Shell	Team Zenith Sion – Lausanne	14	0	0	0	2	102	**3rd**
2017	Finali Mondiali - Copp Shell	Team Zenith Sion – Lausanne	1	0	0	0	0	N/A	7th
2018	Ferrari Challenge Europe - Coppa Shell Pro-Am	Team Zenith Sion – Lausanne	14	4	2	5	8	173.5	**1st**
2018	Finali Mondiali - Coppa Shell Pro-Am	Team Zenith Sion – Lausanne	1	1	1	0	1	N/A	**1st**
2020	Ultimate Cup Series Challenge Monoplace - F3R	Sports Promotion	9	0	?	?	3	133	7th
2021	24H TCE Series - TCR	Autorama Motorsport by Wolf-Power Racing	1	0	0	0	0	0	NC
2023	Ultimate Cup Series Challenge Monoplace - F3R	Sports-Promotion	6	0	0	0	0	71	12th
2023	TTE Formula Renault Cup	Sport Promotion	2	0	0	0	0	190	17th
2024	Ultimate Cup Series Challenge Monoplace - FR2.0	Sports-Promotion	6	5	0	0	6	160	4th
2024	Ferrari Challenge Europe - Coppa Shell (Silver)	Zenith Scuderia	14	0	0	0	1	38	9th
2025	Ultimate Cup European Series - Hoosier Formula Cup	Sports Promotion							

=== Complete GP3 Series results ===
(key) (Races in bold indicate pole position) (Races in italics indicate fastest lap)

Year	Entrant	1	2	3	4	5	6	7	8	9	10	11	12	13	14	15	16	DC	Points
2011	Jenzer Motorsport	IST; FEA	IST; SPR	CAT; FEA	CAT; SPR	VAL; FEA	VAL; SPR	SIL; FEA	SIL; SPR	NÜR; FEA	NÜR; SPR	HUN; FEA	HUN; SPR	SPA; FEA	SPA; SPR	MNZ; FEA; 16	MNZ; SPR; 20	36th	0
