= Fabienne Wohlwend =

Racing driver from Liechtenstein

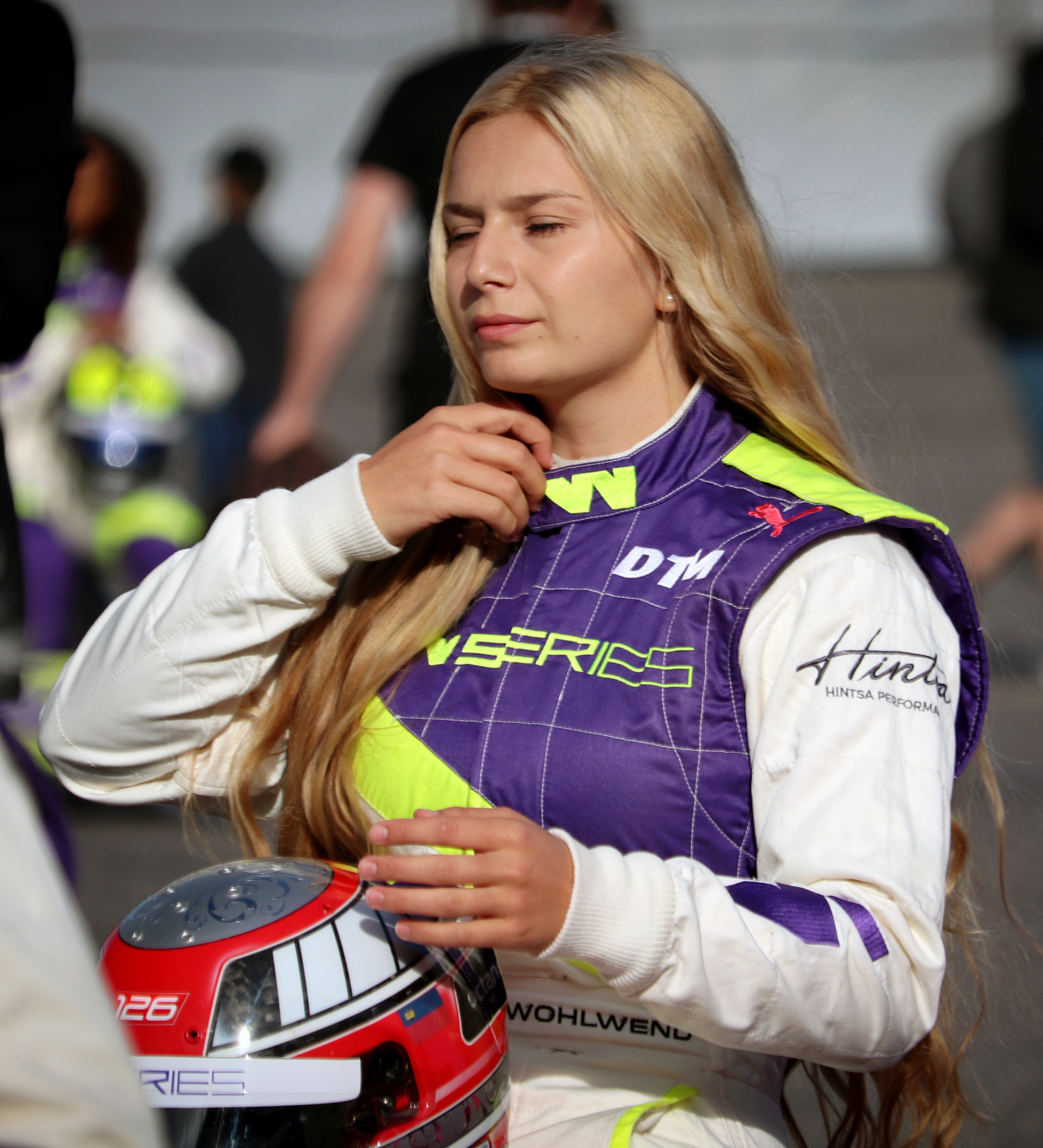
- Wohlwend in 2019
- Nationality: Liechtensteiner
- Born: 7 November 1997 (age 29) Vaduz, Liechtenstein

W Series
- Categorisation: FIA Silver (2021–present)
- Years active: 2019, 2021–2022
- Teams: Hitech Grand Prix; Double R Racing (Note: Competed under the commercial title "Bunker Racing" in the 2021 W Series season.) (Note: Competed under the commercial title "CortDAO W Series Team" in the 2022 W Series season.)
- Starts: 21
- Wins: 0
- Podiums: 3
- Poles: 1
- Fastest laps: 0
- Best finish: 6th in 2019, 2021

Previous series
- 2016 2017 2017 2018–2020 2019–2026 2022–2026 2023 2025: Formula 4 Italy; Audi Sport TT Cup; Ferrari Challenge Europe – Coppa Shell; Ferrari Challenge Europe – Trofeo Pirelli; VLN Series / Nürburgring Langstrecken-Serie; Indian Racing League; ADAC GT4 Germany; GT Winter Series

Championship titles
- 2016 2018 2025–26: Italian F4 Woman Trophy; Ferrari Challenge – Finali Mondiali (TP Am); Indian Racing League

Fabienne Wohlwend (born 7 November 1997) is a racing driver from Liechtenstein. She formerly competed in the W Series and in the 2025-26 Indian Racing League champion.

== Biography ==
=== Karting ===
Wohlwend began karting aged seven, mainly participating in Swiss and German championships due to educational requirements, finishing runner-up in the 2012 Schweizer Kart Meisterschaft (KF3). Despite usually competing as a private entry with rented equipment and seldom competing internationally, she scored a top-ten in the KF3 class of the 2011 Trofeo Andrea Margutti.

=== Formula 4 ===
Wohlwend entered car racing in 2016, debuting in the Italian F4 Championship with Aragón Racing. She failed to qualify for the final at the first round in Misano (the series ran a unique format for said round after 41 cars entered a circuit with a capacity of 36), after which she switched to DR Formula. After the qualifying race system was abandoned, the Liechtensteiner did not score any points during the course of the season - her best finish being an eleventh place in the final race of the season at Monza. Being the only woman competing in that championship, she won the Women's Trophy class uncontested.

=== Audi Sport TT Cup ===
Wohlwend moved into touring cars for 2017, successfully applying for the Audi Sport TT Cup. Her best result of eighth came in her first race in the category at the Hockenheimring, and the Liechtensteiner finished the season eleventh in the standings.

=== Ferrari Challenge ===
Wohlwend twinned her application to the Audi Sport TT Cup with a partial campaign in the Ferrari Challenge European Championship. Contesting six races in the amateur-level Coppa Shell class, she scored two pole positions, four podiums and a race win at Imola – in the process becoming the first woman to win a race outright for the Ferrari marque. Wohlwend also competed in the Ferrari Challenge season-ending Finali Mondiali at Mugello, finishing third in the Coppa Shell class having benefitted from a controversial pass on Manuela Gostner.

With the demise of the Audi TT Cup, Wohlwend remained in the Ferrari Challenge – however made the step up to the Am class of the Trofeo Pirelli division. In a season plagued with inconsistency, she won three of the fourteen races – one at the Circuit de Spa-Francorchamps and both races at the Misano World Circuit – and finished second in the championship to Briton Chris Froggatt. She returned to the Finali Mondiali event for 2018, winning the Am class of the Trofeo Pirelli race.

For 2019, Wohlwend again competed in the Trofeo Pirelli division of Ferrari Challenge, this time as a Pro driver. This campaign consisted of the Valencia, Imola and Mugello events as the others clashed with her W Series campaign; she scored a best result of fourth in the World Final. She returned in 2020 for a planned full campaign, scoring pole position in the first race at Imola before suffering a fuel pump failure on the final lap. In a reduced field due to the coronavirus, she maintained consistent appearances on the podium but race wins proved elusive – and eventually missed three races in two events due to mechanical problems. She finally scored a win in the penultimate race of the season at Misano before following it up with a second place in the Finali Mondiali – her third Finali podium in four attempts.

=== W Series ===
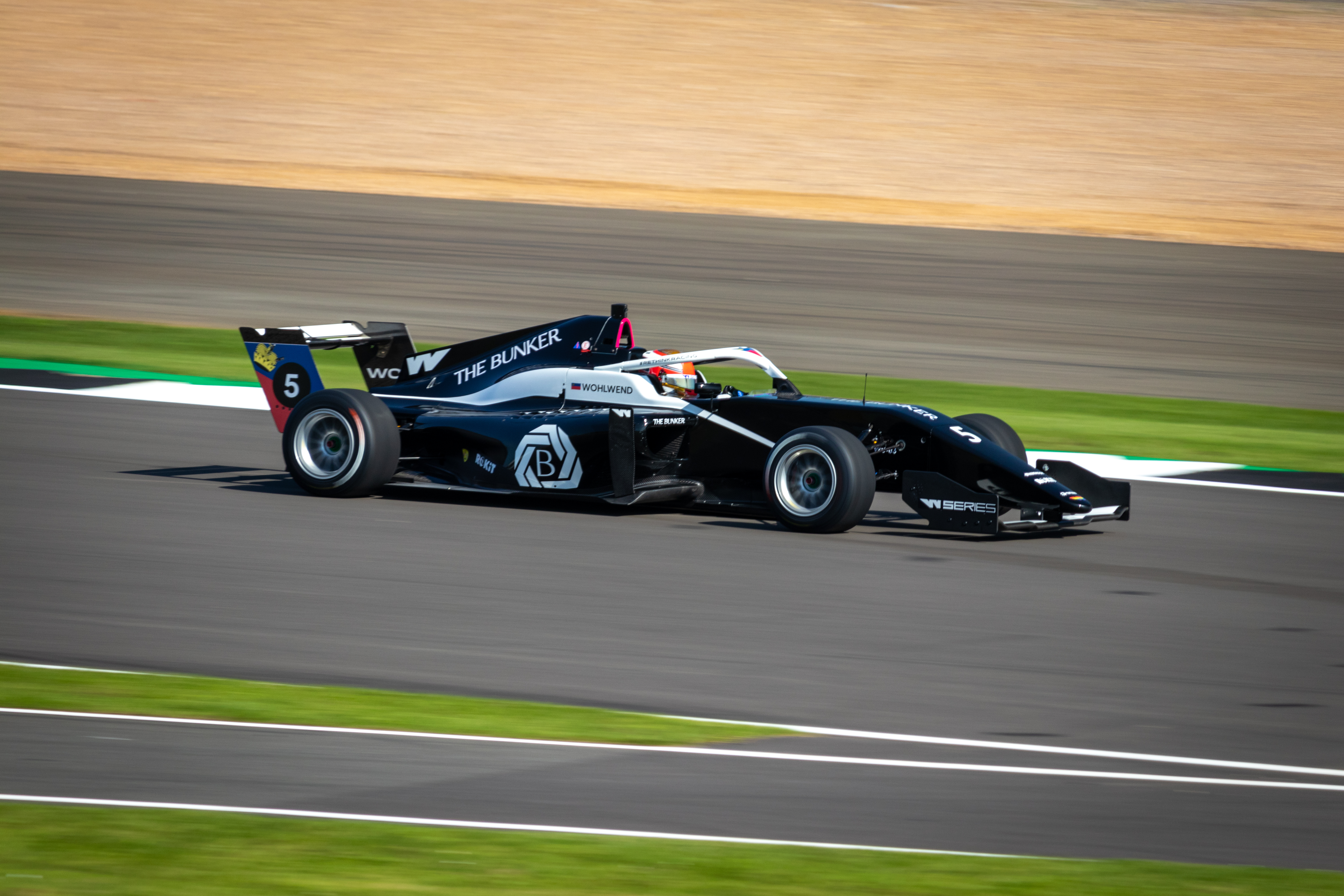
Wohlwend en route to second place in the 2021 W Series Silverstone round.

In 2019, Wohlwend returned to open-wheel racing, having qualified for the W Series – a Formula Regional championship solely for women. Competing against mostly professional drivers for the first time, she finished sixth and seventh in the opening rounds at Hockenheim and Zolder, having qualified on the front row in the former. At the third round at Misano, she claimed the second-ever pole position for a Liechtensteiner in FIA-sanctioned open-wheel racing, a result which she converted into a podium finish. She finished fourth ahead of a hard-charging Emma Kimiläinen at the Norisring, but ended the Assen race down in fifteenth after breaking her front wing whilst trying to pass Gosia Rdest. The final race at Brands Hatch resulted in a fifth-place finish on the tail of series champion Jamie Chadwick, but second place for Kimiläinen meant Wohlwend dropped to sixth in the standings.

Wohlwend was scheduled to return to the championship in 2020 before it was cancelled in response to the COVID-19 pandemic. She contested the series’ replacement eSports league, finishing eleventh in the standings with two podiums having missed three events due to real-world Ferrari Challenge commitments.

Wohlwend continued to compete in the W Series on its return in 2021 as a Formula One support series. In the opening race of the season in Austria, she finished on the podium after starting from ninth position. Having struggled to a solitary point in the second event at the Red Bull Ring, she started on the front row in Silverstone and led most of the race before being overtaken by Alice Powell in the closing stages. She collided with Ayla Ågren on the opening lap in Budapest, breaking her front wing and becoming the only non-finisher. Wohlwend was involved in the six-car qualifying pile-up at Spa-Francorchamps, but fought back to seventh in the race. She again crashed in qualifying at Zandvoort, but only recovered to sixteenth. The final event of the season in Austin, her first outside of Europe, netted her a ninth and a DNF, leaving her sixth in the standings.

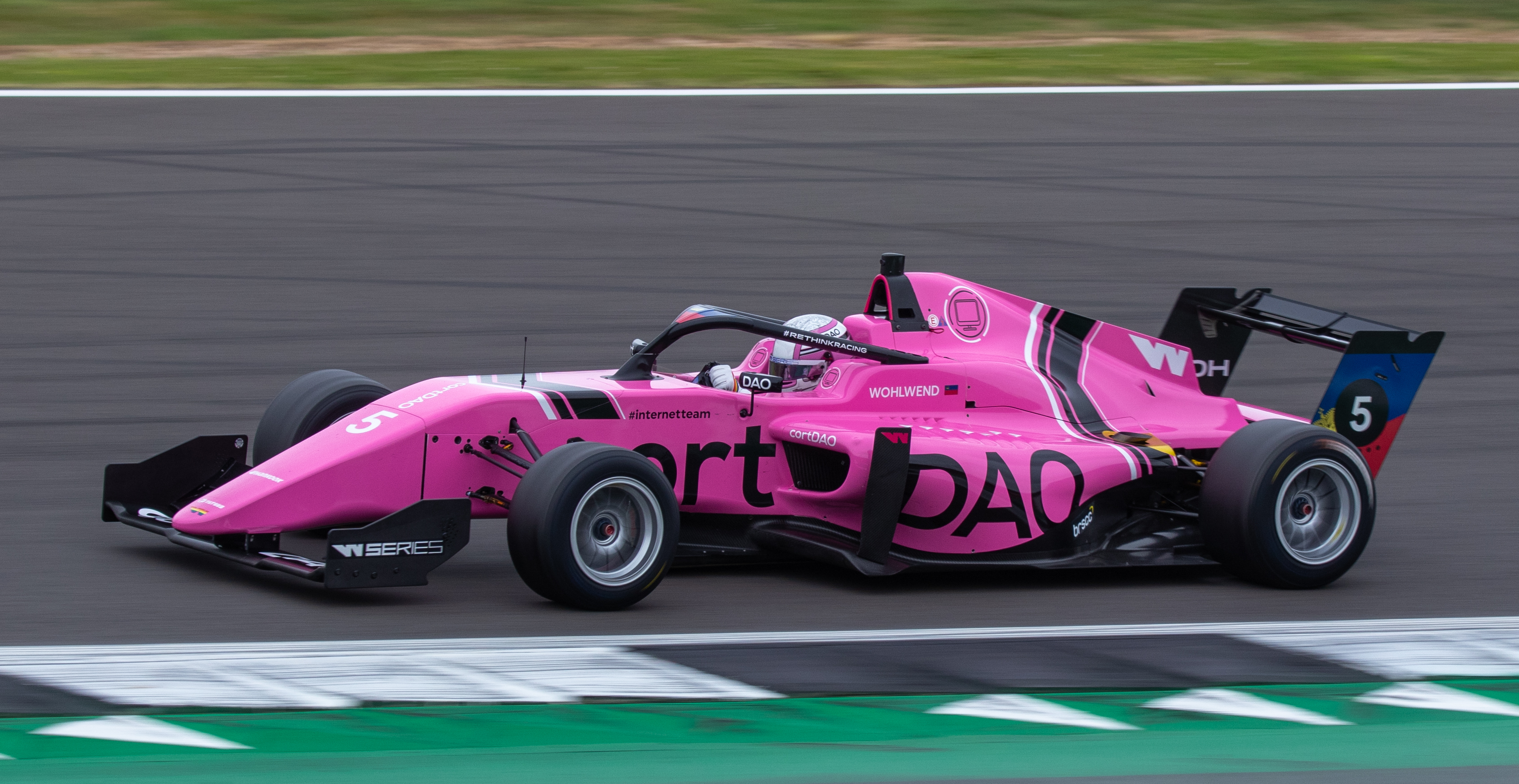
Wohlwend competing in the 2022 W Series Silverstone round.

Wohlwend returned to the championship in 2022 with the CortDAO commercial entrant. At the opening round in Miami, she qualified fifth for both races despite crashing late in the session – in the first race she crashed into Abbie Eaton and she finished eleventh in the second after a grid penalty for the incident with the Briton. After a ninth-place finish in Barcelona, she finished fourth at Silverstone after passing Beitske Visser on the penultimate lap. She finished seventh at Circuit Paul Ricard after a spirited fight with team-mate Marta García and followed it up with sixth at the Hungaroring. The Liechtensteiner finished eighth in her first Asian race at the Marina Bay Street Circuit before the season was cut short due to financial issues; her worst W Series campaign ended with 32 points and tenth in the standings.

=== Nürburgring ===
Wohlwend made her endurance racing debut in the VLN Series in 2019, contesting VLN5 in the V4 class. She did not finish the race after a major crash at Schwedenkreuz. She returned to the championship in 2021 in the VT2 category, with her first race cancelled due to snowfall and her second resulting in a fourth in class, followed up by a podium in NLS3. She was picked up by WS Racing to contest the 2021 Nürburgring 24 Hours Qualifying Race in their Audi R8 GT4 alongside Carrie Schreiner, Célia Martin and Laura Kraihammer – a last-minute replacement for Pippa Mann and Christina Nielsen who had failed to obtain the correct licences in time. A class win followed, impressing the outfit – and they retained the Liechtensteiner but moved her to their VT2-class BMW 328i for the 24 Hour race after Mann and Nielsen met their licence requirements, where she finished ninth in class after less than half of the race was run under green flags due to torrential rain and fog.

Wohlwend returned to the NLS in 2022 with WS Racing's "Girls Only" GT4 squad. After not starting the first race of the season due to a practice crash for co-driver Nielsen, she took part in NLS3 before finishing her first full Nürburgring 24 Hours in thirty-fifth overall and second-best BMW outright alongside Schreiner, Martin and Mann. She returned to the category in 2023 with the same team in an updated model M4, however her entry was disqualified from the first round after breaching the Nürburgring's noise restrictions. The "Girls Only" crew went on to win both Nürburgring 24 Hour Qualirennen heats in class that season, but finished behind their team car in the main event having suffered a broken rear axle from a crash in the night. Wohlwend and Martin contested two more NLS races in 2023, retiring from one with the Girls Only squad from a puncture and finishing on the podium in the SP10 class in the finale with a PROsport Racing Aston Martin.

Wohlwend returned to the team for 2024, scoring her third class podium in another weather-truncated Nürburgring 24 Hours. An oversubscription of drivers to the project in 2025 led to her competing in only two NLS races prior to the 24 Hours, winning one of the Qualirennen in torrential rain, before finishing fourth in the AT3 class of the N24 after co-driver Patricija Stalidzane ran up the back of a GT3 car entering a Code 60 at Metzgesfeld in the night.

Wohlwend and the "Girls Only" project upgraded to a Porsche 911 GT3 Cup car for the 2026 NLS season. The first event of the season was cancelled due to snowfall before Wohlwend collided with the KCMG Mercedes GT3 in qualifying for the second, resulting in a DNS. Wohlwend did not compete in the 2026 24 Hours of Nürburgring after co-driver Janina Schall crashed into a stationary car in practice and cracked the chassis.

=== Indian Racing League ===
Wohlwend was announced as a late replacement for Aurelia Nobels for the Godspeed Kochi franchise in the inaugural Indian Racing League. Following the cancelled season-opener in Hyderabad, Wohlwend scored dual podiums in the first round at Irungattukottai and went on to help the Kochi team secure the teams' championship alongside Ruhaan Alva, Nikhil Bohra and Alister Yoong. The Liechtensteiner returned in 2023 to help defend the championship, but failed to finish any of her three races in a disrupted season due to Cyclone Michaung and ultimately finished ninth through co-driver Alva's results.

Wohlwend returned to the series in 2024, after Sourav Ganguly and the Shrachi Group bought out the Godspeed Kochi franchise and re-named it "Rarh Bengal Tigers" – retaining the existing four drivers. Through consistent top-five and podium finishes, Wohlwend and Alva were in championship contention entering the final race of the season in Coimbatore before Alva lost control at the wet start and collided with Akash Gowda; the pair finished the season third.

Wohlwend was picked by the Goa Aces in the 2025 season draft, pairing up with reigning dual champion Raoul Hyman. She finished runner-up in her first race of the season before taking her first win in the category in a two-driver race in Goa. The championship was cut short a round early, resulting in Wohlwend and Hyman being crowned champions. Wohlwend returned with Goa and Hyman to defend her title in 2026.

=== ADAC GT4 Germany ===
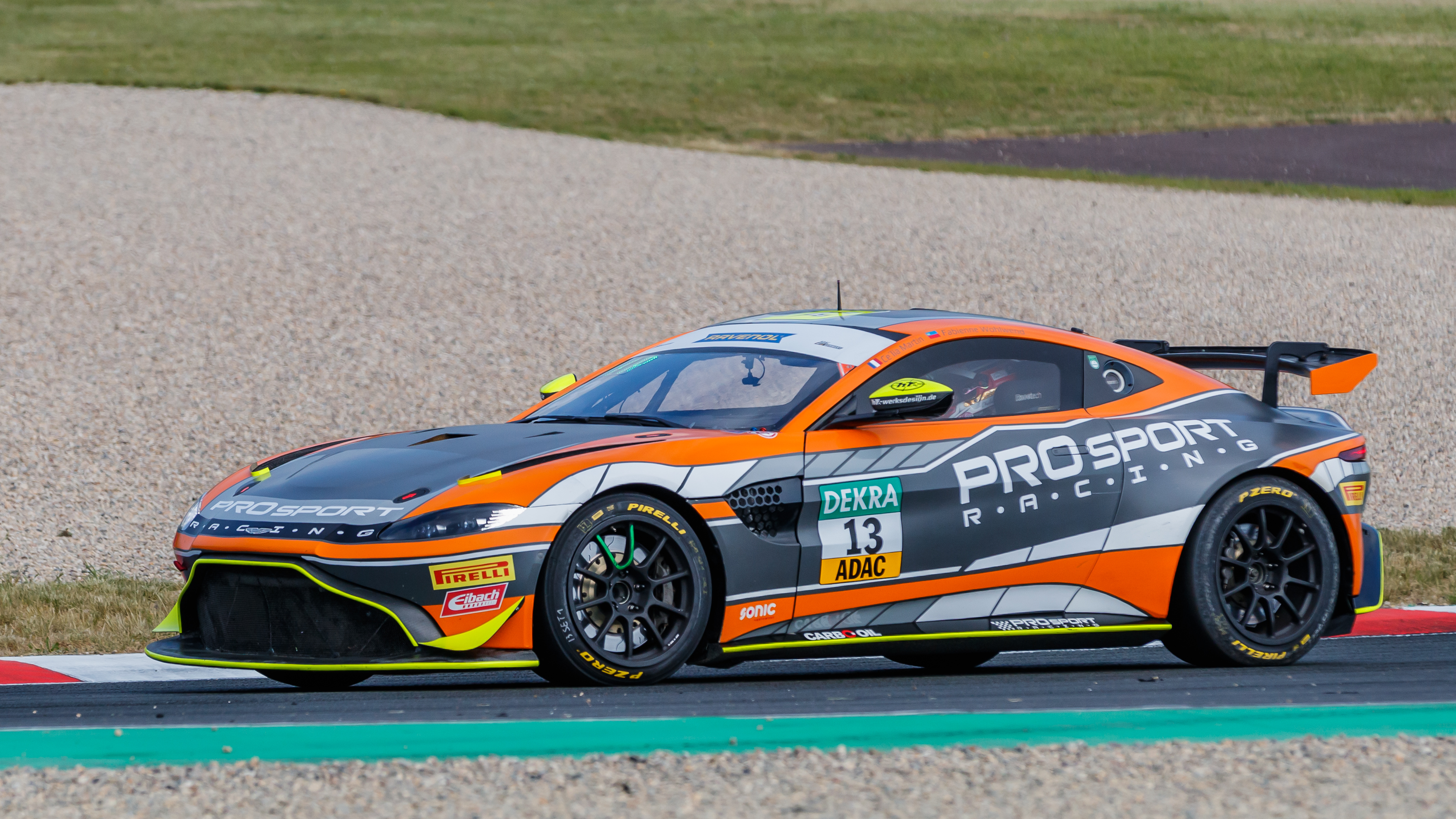
Wohlwend's Aston Martin Vantage GT4 during the 2023 ADAC GT4 Germany Oschersleben round.

Wohlwend joined her NLS Series co-driver Martin in the ADAC GT4 Germany series for 2023 with Aston Martin team PROsport Racing. Despite Wohlwend running inside the top ten in the first race at the Nürburgring before a puncture and qualifying inside the top fifteen for the second race at the Nürburgring, the pair ultimately scored just one points finish at the Sachsenring and ended the season thirty-fourth in the standings as their team-mates Hugo Sasse and Mike David Ortmann claimed the title.

=== GT Winter and Summer Series ===
Wohlwend made her GT3 début in the 2025 GT Winter Series, driving an Aston Martin Vantage alongside Adrian Rziczny for PROsport Racing at the final round of the season in Barcelona. Wohlwend crashed on the opening lap of her sprint race in damp conditions, the damage proving too great to repair for the final race of the weekend.

She returned to Gedlich-run competition for the final round of the 2026 GT Summer Series at the Hockenheimring, driving a Porsche Carrera Cup car for Liechtenstein team SA Performance, becoming the first female driver to compete in the Summer Series. Wohlwend won her début race in class and scored two further podiums, narrowly missing out on the win in the feature race.

== Personal life ==
Wohlwend has been nominated for Liechtenstein Sportswoman of the Year six times between 2018 and 2025. Since July 2023, Wohlwend is one of six Liechtenstein athletes to be employed by the Liechtenstein Olympic Committee.

Wohlwend also works for the Formula One Paddock Club and is an ambassador and content creator for Rowe Racing.

== Racing record ==
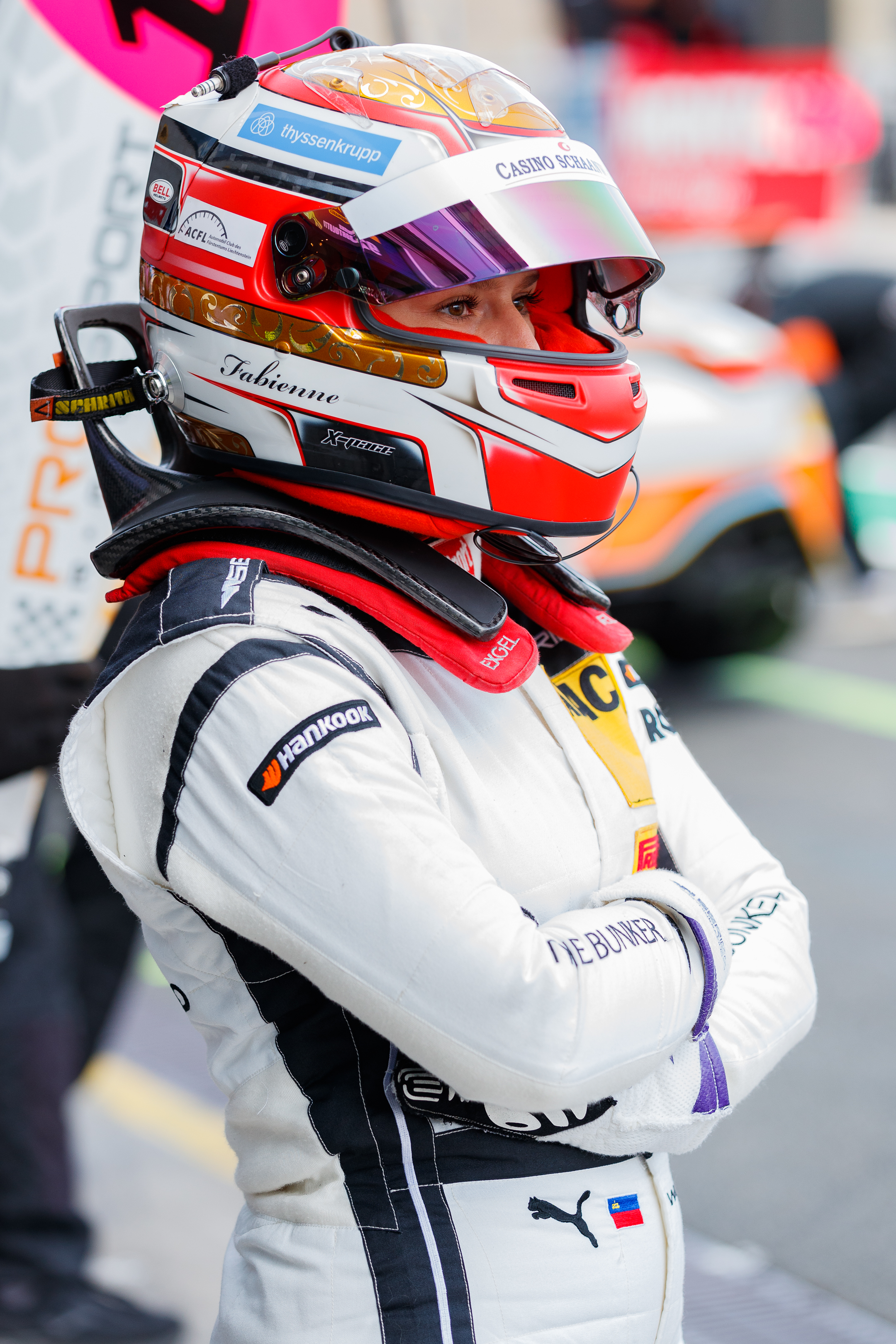
Wohlwend in 2023.

=== Career summary ===
Season	Series	Position	Team	Car
2016	Italian F4 Championship	35th	Aragón Racing; DR Formula	Tatuus–Abarth F4 T-014
2017	Audi Sport TT Cup	11th	Audi Sport Customer Racing	Audi TT Mk.3 Cup
2017	Ferrari Challenge Europe - Coppa Shell	6th	Octane126	Ferrari 488 Challenge
2018	Ferrari Challenge Europe - Trofeo Pirelli (Am)	**2nd**	Octane126	Ferrari 488 Challenge
2019	Ferrari Challenge Europe - Trofeo Pirelli (Pro)	7th	Octane126	Ferrari 488 Challenge
2019	W Series	6th	Hitech Grand Prix	Tatuus–Alfa Romeo F3 T-318
2019	VLN Series - Class V4	NC	Jaco's Paddock Motorsport	BMW 325i (E90)
2020–21	Ferrari Challenge Europe - Trofeo Pirelli (Pro)	**2nd**	Octane126	Ferrari 488 Challenge Evo
2021	Nürburgring Langstrecken-Serie - Class VT2	39th	Adrenalin Motorsport	BMW 330i (G20)
2021	W Series	6th	Double R Racing	Tatuus–Alfa Romeo F3 T-318
2022	Nürburgring Langstrecken-Serie - Class SP8T	4th	WS Racing	BMW M4 (F82) GT4
2022	W Series	10th	Double R Racing	Tatuus–Alfa Romeo F3 T-318; Tatuus–Toyota FT-60
2022	Indian Racing League	6th	Godspeed Kochi	Wolf–Aprilia GB08 "Thunder"
2023	Nürburgring Langstrecken-Serie - Class SP8T	NC	WS Racing	BMW M4 (G82) GT4
2023	ADAC GT4 Germany	34th	PROsport Racing	Aston Martin Vantage AMR GT4
2023	Nürburgring Langstrecken-Serie - Class SP10	35th	PROsport Racing	Aston Martin Vantage AMR GT4
2023	Indian Racing League	9th‡	Godspeed Kochi	Wolf–Aprilia GB08 "Thunder"
2024	Nürburgring Langstrecken-Serie - Class SP8T	IE	WS Racing	BMW M4 (G82) GT4
2024	Indian Racing League	**3rd**‡	Rarh Bengal Tigers	Wolf–Aprilia GB08 "Thunder"
2025	GT Winter Series – GT3 Cup	15th	PROsport Racing	Aston Martin Vantage AMR GT3 Evo
2025	Nürburgring Langstrecken-Serie - Class SP8T	IE	WS Racing	BMW M4 (G82) GT4
2025	Nürburgring Langstrecken-Serie - Class AT3	IE	WS Racing	BMW M4 (G82) GT4
2025–26	Indian Racing League	**1st**‡	Goa Aces JA Racing	Wolf–Aprilia GB08 "Thunder"; Mygale–Renault M21-F4
2026	Nürburgring Langstrecken-Serie - Class AT2	5th	WS Racing	Porsche 911 (992) GT3 Cup
2026	Nürburgring Langstrecken-Serie - Class SP10	IE	WS Racing	Porsche Cayman (982) GT4 RS
2026	GT Summer Series – Cup 2	5th	SA Performance	Porsche 911 (992) GT3 Cup
2026	Indian Racing League	*	Goa Aces JA Racing	Wolf–Aprilia GB08 "Thunder"

- * Season in progress.
- ‡ Standings based on entry points, not individual drivers.

=== Italian F4 Championship results ===
(key) (Races in bold indicate pole position) (Races in italics indicate fastest lap)

Year	Team	1	2	3	4	5	6	7	8	9	10	11	12	13	14	15	16	17	18	19	20	21	22	23	DC	Points
2016	Aragón Racing	MIS; R1	MIS; R2; 21	MIS; R3; 20	MIS; R4; DNQ																				35th	0
2016	DR Formula					ADR; R1; 17	ADR; R2	ADR; R3; Ret	ADR; R4; 22	IMO1; R1; 26	IMO1; R2; 20	IMO1; R3; 20	MUG; R1; 24	MUG; R2; 23	MUG; R3; 26	VLL; R1; 17	VLL; R2; 24	VLL; R3; 19	IMO2; R1; 19	IMO2; R2; Ret	IMO2; R3; 24	MNZ; R1; 12	MNZ; R2; 16	MNZ; R3; 11	35th	0

=== Audi Sport TT Cup results ===
(key) (Races in bold indicate pole position) (Races in italics indicate fastest lap)

Year	Team	1	2	3	4	5	6	7	8	9	10	11	12	13	14	Pos.	Pts
2017	Audi Sport Customer Racing	HOC1; R1; 8	HOC1; R2; 12	NÜR1; R1; A (Note: Race was abandoned following damage to circuit infrastructure.)	NÜR1; R2; 13	NRM; R1; 12	NRM; R2; Ret	ZAN; R1; 13	ZAN; R2; 11	NÜR2; R1; 11	NÜR2; R2; Ret	SPI; R1; 9	SPI; R2; 11	HOC2; R1; 9	HOC2; R2; 9	11th	97

=== Ferrari Challenge Europe results ===
(key) (Races in bold indicate pole position) (Races in italics indicate fastest lap)

Year	Team	Cat.	1	2	3	4	5	6	7	8	9	10	11	12	13	14	Pos.	Pts.
2017	Octane126	Coppa Shell	VAL; R1	VAL; R2	MNZ; R1; 5	MNZ; R2; Ret	BUD; 1	BUD; R2	LEC; R1	LEC; R2	SIL; R1	SIL; R2	IMO; R1; 2	IMO; R2; **1**	MUG; R1; 3	MUG; R2; **2**	8th	67.5
2018	Octane126	Trofeo Pirelli Am	MUG; R1; 3	MUG; R2; 3	SIL; R1; 3	SIL; R2; 2	SPA; R1; 8	SPA; R2; 1	MIS; R1; **1**	MIS; R2; **1**	BRN; R1; 3	BRN; R2; 3	BCN; R1; 9	BCN; R2; 2	MNZ; R1; **5**	MNZ; R2; **Ret**	2nd	142
2019	Octane126	Trofeo Pirelli Pro	BHR; R1	BHR; R2	VAL; R1; 8	VAL; R2; 7	SPI; R1	SPI; R2	LMS	NÜR; R1	NÜR; R2	IMO; R1; 5	IMO; R2; 6	MUG; R1; 6	MUG; R2; 6		7th	36
2020–21	Octane126	Trofeo Pirelli Pro	IMO; R1; **3**	IMO; R2; 2	BCN; R1; 3	BCN; R2; 3	ALG; R1; 2	ALG; R2; 2	MUG; R1; **2**	MUG; R2; **2**	SPA; R1; 4	SPA; R2; DNS	MIS1; R1; WD	MIS1; R2; WD	MIS2; R1; 1	MIS2; R2; 3	2nd	132

=== Ferrari Challenge Finali Mondiali results ===
Year	Class	Team	Car	Circuit	Pos.
2017	**Coppa Shell**	(Switzerland) Octane126	Ferrari 488 Challenge	(Italy) Mugello Circuit	**3rd**
2018	**Trofeo Pirelli Am**	(Switzerland) Octane126	Ferrari 488 Challenge	(Italy) Autodromo Nazionale di Monza	**1st**
2019	**Trofeo Pirelli Pro**	(Switzerland) Octane126	Ferrari 488 Challenge	(Italy) Mugello Circuit	4th
2020	**Trofeo Pirelli Pro**	(Switzerland) Octane126	Ferrari 488 Challenge Evo	(Italy) Misano World Circuit	**2nd**

=== W Series results ===
(key) (Races in bold indicate pole position) (Races in italics indicate fastest lap)

Year	Team	1	2	3	4	5	6	7	8	9	10	Pos.	Pts
2019	Hitech Grand Prix	HOC; 6	ZOL; 7	**MIS**; 3	NRM; 4	ASN; 15	BRH; 5					6th	51
2021	Double R Racing	SPI1; 3	SPI2; 10	SIL; 2	BUD; Ret	SPA; 7	ZAN; 16	AUS; R1; 9	AUS; R2; Ret			6th	42
2022	Double R Racing	MIA; R1; Ret	MIA; R2; 11	BCN; 9	SIL; 4	LEC; 7	BUD; 6	SIN; 8	AUS; C	MXC; 1 C	MXC; 2 C	10th	32

=== Nürburgring Langstrecken-Serie results ===
(key) (Races in bold indicate pole position) (Races in italics indicate fastest lap)

Year	Team	Class	1	2	3	4	5	6	7	8	9	10	11	Pos.	Pts
2019	Jaco's Paddock Motorsport	V4	VLN1	VLN2	VLN3	VLN4	VLN5; Ret	VLN6	VLN7	VLN8; DNS	VLN9			NC	0
2021	Adrenalin Motorsport	VT2	NLS1; A (Note: Race was abandoned due to snowfall.)	NLS2; 4	NLS3; 3	NLS4	NLS5	NLS6	NLS7	NLS8	NLS9			39th	16.74
2022	WS Racing	SP8T	NLS1; WD	NLS2	NLS3; 2	NLS4	NLS5	NLS6	NLS7	NLS8				4th	5
2023	WS Racing	SP8T	NLS1; DSQ	NLS2	NLS3	NLS4	NLS5; Ret	NLS6; R1	NLS6; R2	NLS7				NC	0
2023	PROsport Racing	SP10									NLS8; 3			35th	8
2024	WS Racing	SP8T	NLS1	NLS2; 2	N24; QR1; 3	N24; QR2; 2	NLS3	NLS4; Ret	NLS5	NLS6				IE	–
2025	WS Racing	SP8T	NLS1; Ret	NLS2	NLS3					NLS5; R1; 3	NLS5; R2; 3	NLS6	NLS7	IE	–
2025	WS Racing	AT3				N24; QR1; 1	N24; QR2	NLSL	NLS4					IE	–
2026	WS Racing	AT2	NLS1; C	NLS2; DNS	NLS3; 2	N24; QR1; A (Note: Race was abandoned following the death of Juha Miettinen.)	N24; QR2; 2	NLS4		NLS6; R1; DSQ	NLS6; R2; DNS	NLS7		5th	4
2026	WS Racing	SP10							NLS5; Ret					IE	–

=== 24 Hours of Nürburgring results ===
Year	Team	Co-Drivers	Car	Class	Laps	Ovr. Pos.	Class Pos.
2021	(Germany) WS Racing	(Denmark) Nicolaj Kandborg (Germany) Niklas Kry (Germany) Tobias Wolf	BMW 328i (F30)	VT2	43^{1}	97th	9th
2022	(Germany) WS Racing	(United Kingdom) Pippa Mann (France) Célia Martin (Germany) Carrie Schreiner	BMW M4 (F82) GT4	SP8T	139	35th	**3rd**
2023	(Germany) WS Racing	(United Kingdom) Pippa Mann (France) Célia Martin (Netherlands) Beitske Visser	BMW M4 (G82) GT4	SP8T	135	81st	**2nd**
2024	(Germany) WS Racing	(United Kingdom) Pippa Mann (Germany) Carrie Schreiner (Netherlands) Beitske Visser	BMW M4 (G82) GT4	SP8T	44^{1}	47th	**3rd**
2025	(Germany) WS Racing	(Germany) Janina Schall (Germany) Carrie Schreiner (Latvia) Patricija Stalidzane	BMW M4 (G82) GT4	AT3	104	66th	4th
2026	(Germany) WS Racing	(Germany) Michelle Halder (Germany) Janina Schall (Germany) Carrie Schreiner	Porsche 911 (992) GT3 Cup	AT2	0	WD	

- **^1** – More than half of the allotted race time was spent under red flag.

=== Indian Racing League results ===
(key) (Races in bold indicate pole position) (Races in italics indicate fastest lap)

Year	Franchise	1	2	3	4	5	6	7	8	9	10	11	12	Pos.	Pts
2022	Godspeed Kochi	HYD1; R1; C	HYD1; R2; C	HYD1; R3; C	IRU1; R1	IRU1; R2; 2	IRU1; R3; 2	IRU2; R1	IRU2; R2; 9	IRU2; R3; 5	HYD2; R1; Ret	HYD2; R2	HYD2; R3; 6	6th	92
2023‡	Godspeed Kochi	IRU1; R1	IRU1; R2; Ret	IRU2; R1; Ret	IRU2; R2	IRU3; R1	IRU3; R2; Ret							9th	28
2024‡	Rarh Bengal Tigers	IRU1; R1	IRU1; R2; 4	IGR; R1; 4	IGR; R2	IRU2; R1	IRU2; R2; 5	KAR1; R1; 4	KAR1; R2	KAR2; R1; 6	KAR2; R2			3rd	123
2025–26‡	Goa Aces JA Racing	KAR1; R1	KAR1; R2; 2	IRU; R1; 7	IRU; R2	KAR2; R1; Ret	KAR2; R2	GOA; R1	GOA; R2; 4	GOA; R3; 1				1st	177
2026‡	Goa Aces JA Racing	IRU; R1	IRU; R2; 5†	GNO1; R1	GNO1; R2; 5	GNO2; R1	GNO2; R2	NMU; R1	NMU; R1					1st*	37*

‡ Standings based on entry points, not individual drivers.

=== ADAC GT4 Germany results ===
(key) (Races in bold indicate pole position) (Races in italics indicate fastest lap)

Year	Team	1	2	3	4	5	6	7	8	9	10	11	12	Pos.	Pts
2023	PROsport Racing	OSC; R1; 21	OSC; R2; 23	ZAN; R1; 18	ZAN; R2; 21	NÜR; R1; 23	NÜR; R2; Ret	LAU; R1; 22	LAU; R2; 19	SAC; R1; 18	SAC; R2; 12	HOC; R1; 19	HOC; R2; 22	34th	4

=== GT Winter Series ===
Year	Team	Class	1	2	3	4	5	6	7	8	9	10	11	12	13	14	15	Pos.	Pts
2025	PROsport Racing	GT3	EST; R1	EST; R2	EST; R3	POR; R1	POR; R2	POR; R3	VAL; R1	VAL; R2	VAL; R3	ARA; R1	ARA; R2	ARA; R3	BCN; R1	BCN; R2; Ret	BCN; R3; DNS	15th	10‡

‡ - Includes points scored by co-driver.

=== GT Summer Series ===
Year	Team	Class	1	2	3	4	5	6	7	8	9	10	11	12	13	14	15	Pos.	Pts
2026	SA Performance	Cup 2	HOC1; R1	HOC1; R2	HOC1; R3	OSC; R1	OSC; R2	OSC; R3	NÜR; R1	NÜR; R2	NÜR; R3	SPA; R1	SPA; R2	SPA; R3	HOC2; R1; 1	HOC2; R2; 2	HOC2; R3; 2	5th	44
