= Björn Grossmann =

- Nationality: Germany
- Born: Oberndorf am Neckar, Germany

Nürburgring Langstrecken-Serie career
- Debut season: 2017
- Current team: Juta Racing
- Categorisation: FIA Silver (until 2018, 2023–); FIA Bronze (2019–2022)
- Former teams: Octane 126
- Starts: 12
- Championships: 0
- Wins: 0
- Podiums: 4
- Poles: 0
- Fastest laps: 0
- Best finish: 1st in 2019

Previous series
- 2005 - 2025: Ferrari Challenge Europe

Championship titles
- 2006 2015 2016: Ferrari Challenge Europe; Ferrari Challenge Europe; Ferrari Challenge Europe

Björn Grossmann (born 13 May 1984) is a German professional racing driver currently competing in the 2026 Nürburgring Langstrecken-Serie for Juta Racing. He is one of the most successful drivers in the Ferrari Challenge Europe's history, where he is a three-time champion (2006, 2015, 2016), with 25 race wins and 74 podium finishes.

== Early life ==
Björn Grossmann was born on 13 May 1984 in Oberndorf am Neckar, Germany. His family operated a local automotive business called Autohaus Grossmann which gave him an early connection to motorsport and automobiles.

== Career ==
Grossmann made his debut in the Ferrari Challenge Europe. In his first season he scored a podium finish at the Circuit Ricardo Tormo. In only his second year of professional competition Grossmann won the 2006 Ferrari Challenge Europe championship.

Following a period of mediocre results and sporadic entries he returned to full-time competition with the Swiss team Octane 126. In 2015, Grossmann managed the Ferrari Challenge Europe title for a second time, a feat he repeated in 2016 to secure back-to-back championships. During these two seasons he managed 11 pole positions and 7 wins. As of 2026 he remains in the series with over 70 podium finishes and 25 wins.

=== Endurance racing ===
In 2017 Grossmann transitioned into endurance racing, debuting in the Nürburgring Langstrecken-Serie. In 2019, he won a class victory in the NLS SP-X category with another victory in 2020. For the 2026 season, Grossmann moved from Ferrari and signed with Juta Racing, where he currently competes in the NLS driving an Audi R8 LMS Evo II.
