= List of W Series drivers =

List of drivers who participated in the W Series

The following list of W Series drivers lists the 32 drivers who took part in a W Series event during its tenure from 2019 to 2022.

== By driver ==
Key
Colour	Meaning
	Champions

Driver	Country (Note: A drivers' country of citizenship or the country of the passport said driver holds.)	Years	Championships	Race Starts	Pole Positions	Race Wins	Podiums	F/Laps	Total Points	Pole Percentage	Win Percentage	Podium Percentage	F/Lap Percentage	Average Points
Ayla Ågren	Norway	2021–2022	0	8	0	0	0	0	3	0%	0%	0%	0%	0.4
Tereza Bábíčková	Czechia	2022	0	6	0	0	0	0	0	0%	0%	0%	0%	0
Sarah Bovy	Belgium	2019	0	2	0	0	0	0	0	0%	0%	0%	0%	0
Bianca Bustamante	Philippines	2022	0	7	0	0	0	0	2	0%	0%	0%	0%	0.3
Jamie Chadwick	United Kingdom	2019, 2021–2022	3 (2019, 2021, 2022)	21	10	11	18	6	412	48%	52%	86%	29%	19.6
Chloe Chambers	United States	2022	0	7	0	0	0	0	1	0%	0%	0%	0%	0.1
Sabré Cook	United States	2019, 2021	0	14	0	0	0	0	12	0%	0%	0%	0%	0.9
Emely de Heus	Netherlands	2022	0	7	0	0	0	0	1	0%	0%	0%	0%	0.1
Abbie Eaton	United Kingdom	2021–2022	0	14	0	0	0	0	30	0%	0%	0%	0%	2.1
Belén García	Spain	2021–2022	0	15	0	0	1	0	86	0%	0%	7%	0%	5.7
Marta García	Spain	2019, 2021–2022	0	20	2	1	4	0	132	10%	5%	20%	0%	6.6
Megan Gilkes	Canada	2019	0	5	0	0	0	0	0	0%	0%	0%	0%	0
Esmee Hawkey	United Kingdom	2019	0	6	0	0	0	0	2	0%	0%	0%	0%	0.3
Jessica Hawkins	United Kingdom	2019, 2021–2022	0	21	0	0	1	0	76	0%	0%	5%	0%	3.6
Shea Holbrook	United States	2019	0	6	0	0	0	0	0	0%	0%	0%	0%	0
Vivien Keszthelyi	Hungary	2019	0	4	0	0	0	0	1	0%	0%	0%	0%	0.3
Emma Kimiläinen	Finland	2019, 2021–2022	0	19	2	2	8	4	203	11%	11%	42%	21%	10.7
Miki Koyama	Japan	2019, 2021	0	14	0	0	0	1	44	0%	0%	0%	7%	3.1
Nerea Martí	Spain	2021–2022	0	15	1	0	3	0	105	7%	0%	20%	0%	7.0
Sarah Moore	United Kingdom	2019, 2021–2022	0	21	0	0	1	0	106	0%	0%	5%	0%	5.0
Juju Noda	Japan (Note: Noda raced with a Danish licence in 2022 however is a Japanese citizen and passport holder.)	2022	0	7	0	0	0	0	2	0%	0%	0%	0%	0.3
Tasmin Pepper	South Africa	2019	0	6	0	0	0	0	22	0%	0%	0%	0%	3.7
Vittoria Piria	Italy	2019, 2021	0	14	0	0	0	0	25	0%	0%	0%	0%	1.8
Alice Powell	United Kingdom	2019, 2021–2022	0	21	2	5	13	5	294	10%	24%	62%	24%	14.0
Abbi Pulling	United Kingdom	2021–2022	0	11	1	0	3	1	113	9%	0%	27%	9%	10.3
Gosia Rdest	Poland	2019, 2021	0	9	0	0	0	0	12	0%	0%	0%	0%	1.3
Naomi Schiff	Rwanda (Note: Schiff raced with a German licence in 2019 however is a dual Rwandan-Belgian citizen and Rwandan passport holder.)	2019	0	6	0	0	0	0	2	0%	0%	0%	0%	0.3
Irina Sidorkova	Russia	2021	0	5	0	0	1	0	34	0%	0%	20%	0%	6.8
Bruna Tomaselli	Brazil	2021–2022	0	15	0	0	0	0	23	0%	0%	0%	0%	1.5
Beitske Visser	Netherlands	2019, 2021–2022	0	20	1	2	7	2	231	5%	10%	35%	10%	11.6
Fabienne Wohlwend	Liechtenstein (Note: Wohlwend raced with a Swiss licence for multiple seasons however is a Liechtenstein citizen and passport holder.)	2019, 2021–2022	0	21	1	0	3	0	125	5%	0%	14%	0%	6.0
Caitlin Wood	Australia	2019, 2021	0	10	0	0	0	0	22	0%	0%	0%	0%	2.2

^1 – Percentages are of the races contested by said driver.

== By country ==
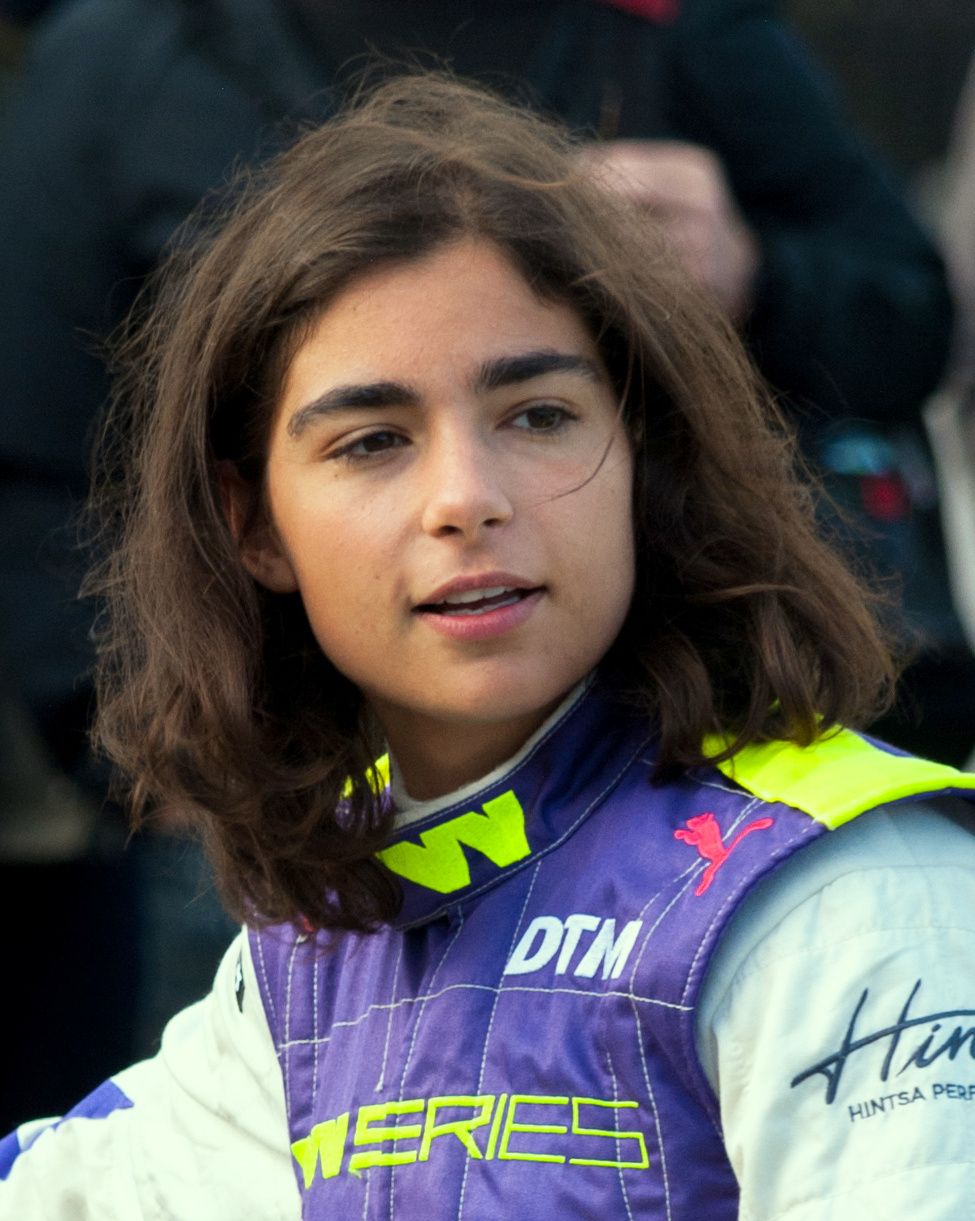
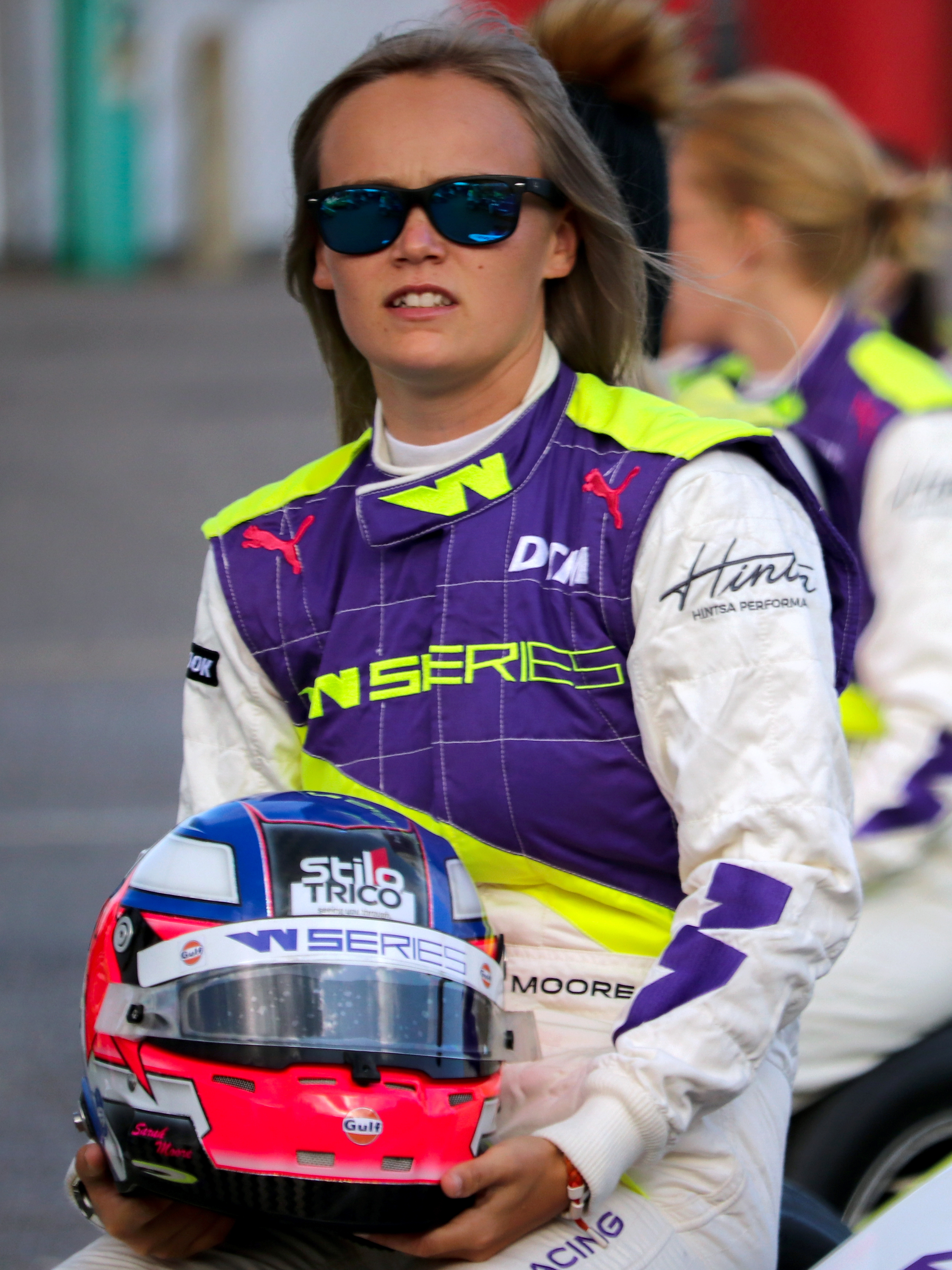
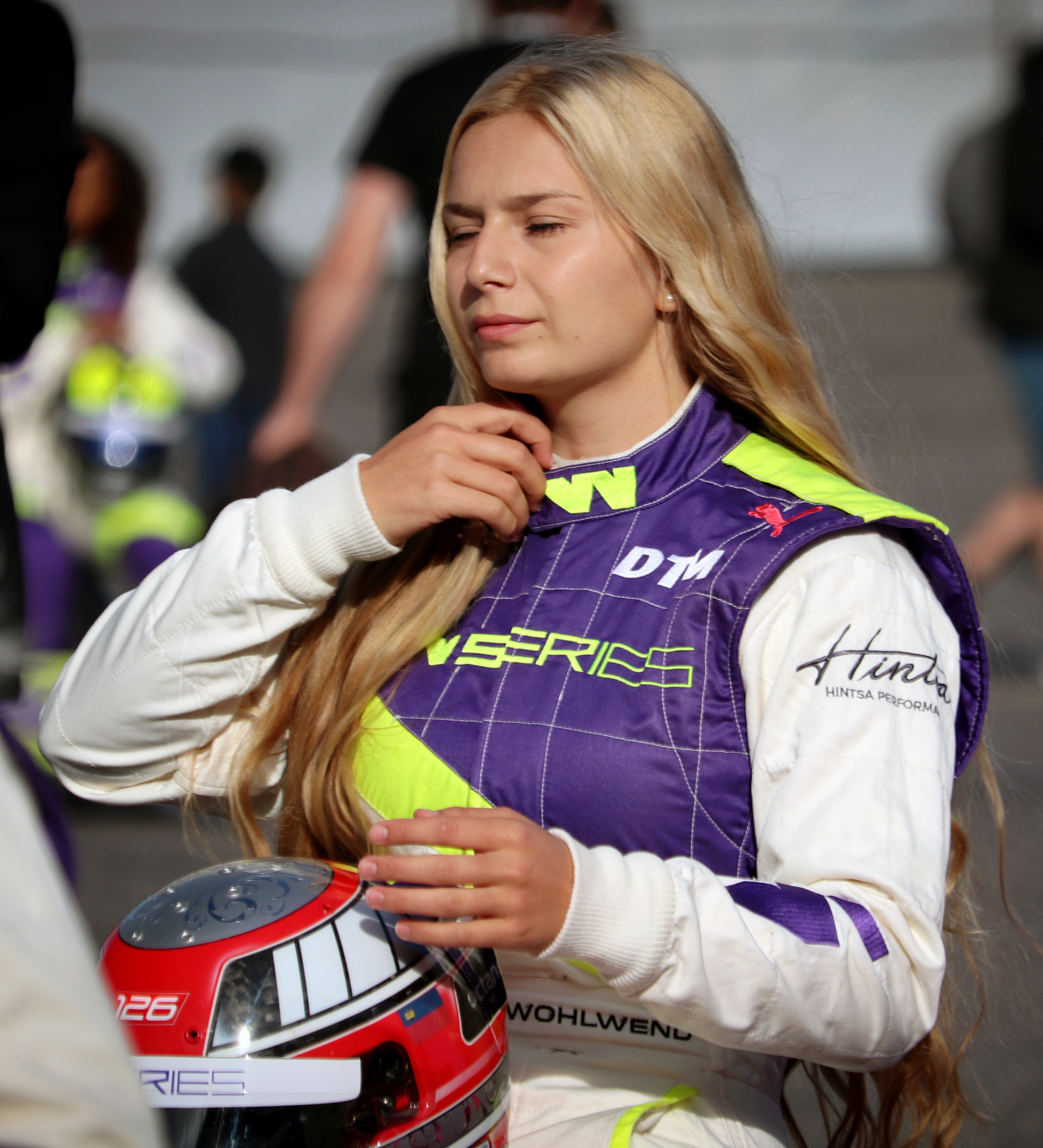
Jamie Chadwick, Sarah Moore and Fabienne Wohlwend are three of five drivers who started all of W Series' 21 races.

Country	Total drivers	Champions	Championships	First driver(s)	Last driver(s)
Australia	1	0	0	Wood (Hockenheim 2019)	Wood (Austin 2021)
Belgium	1	0	0	Bovy (Zolder 2019)	Bovy (Brands Hatch 2019)
Brazil	1	0	0	Tomaselli (Spielberg 1 2021)	Tomaselli (Singapore 2022)
Canada	1	0	0	Gilkes (Hockenheim 2019)	Gilkes (Brands Hatch 2019)
Czechia	1	0	0	Bábíčková (Miami 2022)	Bábíčková (Budapest 2022)
Finland	1	0	0	Kimiläinen (Hockenheim 2019)	Kimiläinen (Singapore 2022)
Hungary	1	0	0	Keszthelyi (Zolder 2019)	Keszthelyi (Brands Hatch 2019)
Italy	1	0	0	Piria (Hockenheim 2019)	Piria (Austin 2021)
Japan	2	0	0	Koyama (Hockenheim 2019)	Noda (Singapore 2022)
Liechtenstein	1	0	0	Wohlwend (Hockenheim 2019)	Wohlwend (Singapore 2022)
Netherlands	2	0	0	Visser (Hockenheim 2019)	De Heus, Visser (Singapore 2022)
Norway	1	0	0	Ågren (Spielberg 1 2021)	Ågren (Singapore 2022)
Philippines	1	0	0	Bustamante (Miami 2022)	Bustamante (Singapore 2022)
Poland	1	0	0	Rdest (Hockenheim 2019)	Rdest (Spa-Francorchamps 2021)
Russia	1	0	0	Sidorkova (Spielberg 1 2021)	Sidorkova (Zandvoort 2021)
Rwanda	1	0	0	Schiff (Hockenheim 2019)	Schiff (Brands Hatch 2019)
South Africa	1	0	0	Pepper (Hockenheim 2019)	Pepper (Brands Hatch 2019)
Spain	3	0	0	M.García (Hockenheim 2019)	B.García, M.García, Martí (Singapore 2022)
United Kingdom	7	1 (Chadwick)	3 (2019, 2021, 2022)	Chadwick, Hawkey, Hawkins, Moore, Powell (Hockenheim 2019)	Chadwick, Eaton, Hawkins, Moore, Powell, Pulling (Singapore 2022)
United States	3	0	0	Cook, Holbrook (Hockenheim 2019)	Chambers (Singapore 2022)

== See also ==
- List of female racing drivers
