= Ayla Ågren =

Norwegian-Swedish racing driver

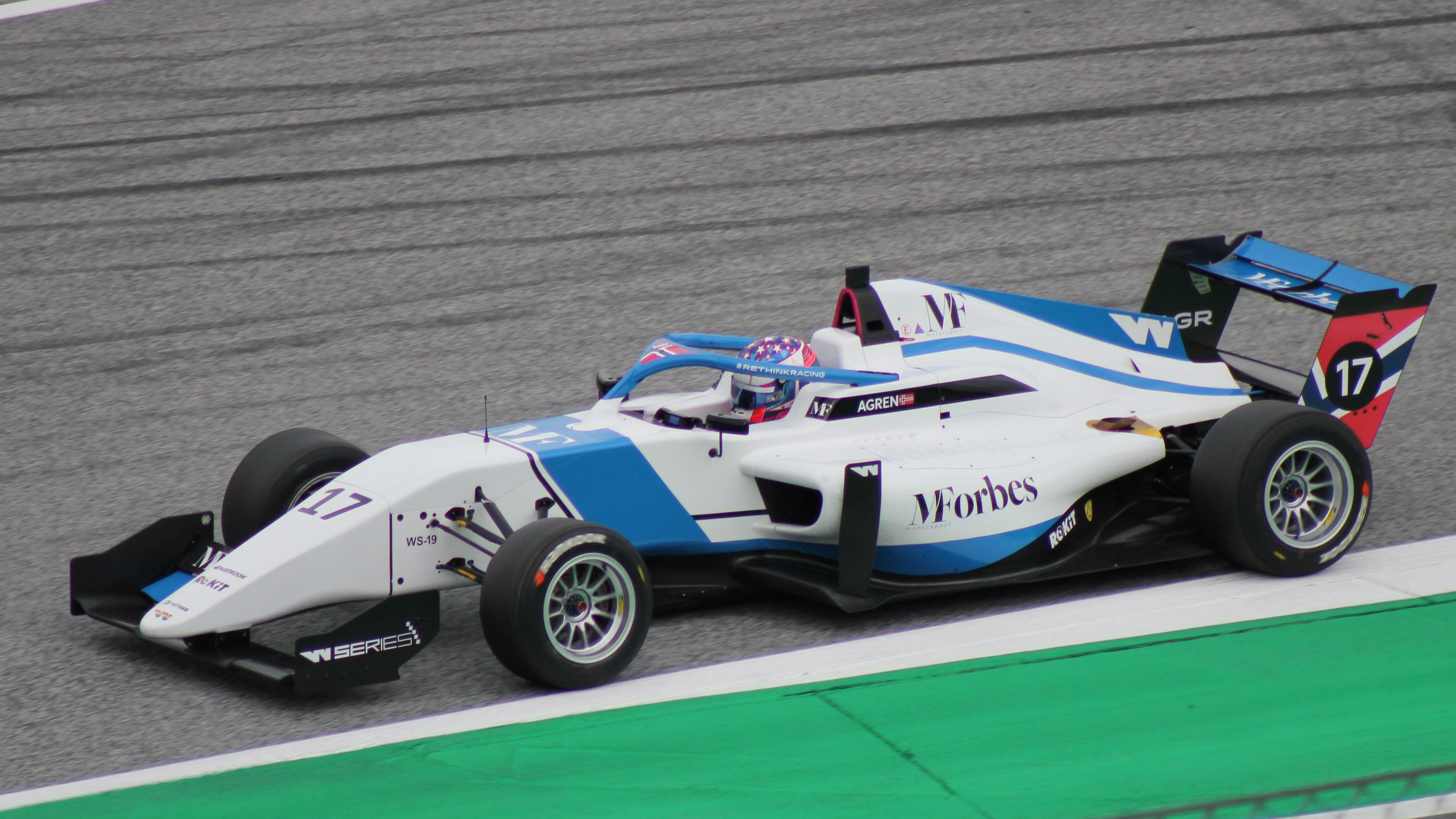
- Ågren in 2021
- Nationality: (Norway) Norwegian (Sweden) Swedish via dual nationality
- Born: 23 July 1993 (age 33) Bærum, Akershus, Norway
- Categorisation: FIA Silver

Previous series
- 2012 2013–2014 2015–2017: Skip Barber F2000 Summer Series; F1600 Championship Series; U.S. F2000 National Championship

Championship titles
- 2014: F1600 Championship Series

Ayla Ågren (born 23 July 1993) is a Norwegian-Swedish racing driver. Representing Norway, she formerly competed in the W Series.

== Biography ==
Following a decade in karting across Europe and Scandinavia, Ågren moved to the United States to forge a professional career – first testing with the Skip Barber Racing School and then competing in their Summer Series, scoring four podiums and finishing eighth overall. In 2013, she moved into F1600, immediately proving competitive and winning the championship at her second attempt with a last-lap pass for victory in the final round at Watkins Glen. The success saw her move onto the Road to Indy schedule, promoted within Team Pelfrey. Whilst initially competitive, her first season in U.S. F2000 proved to be her only full campaign as the funding began to dry up. She managed a fourth place at Road America in 2016 having moved to John Cummiskey Racing, but a move back to Team Pelfrey in 2017 led to a half-season campaign with her final appearance at Iowa ending in an eighth-place finish.

Having spent a year out of racing, Ågren applied for the W Series, a European-based Formula Regional championship solely for women, in 2019. She failed to qualify for the inaugural season, and eventually landed a job as the IndyCar safety car driver having given up on finding a race seat. She would again attempt to qualify for the W Series in 2020, and successfully made the 20-car grid on her second attempt before the season was cancelled in response to the COVID-19 pandemic. She eventually got to compete in the championship in 2021, but only scored points in two races and finished 17th in the standings – Ågren additionally missed the Spa race having been involved in a multi-car pile-up in qualifying. Ågren returned to the series as a reserve driver in 2022, being called up to race in Singapore after Tereza Bábíčková suffered a back injury. During this time, Ågren also worked as a spotter for the short-lived Paretta Autosport IndyCar team.

== Racing record ==
=== Career summary ===
Season	Series	Team	Races	Wins	Poles	F/Laps	Podiums	Points	Position
2012	Skip Barber F2000 Summer Series	N/A	21	0	0	1	4	453	8th
2013	F1600 Championship Series	Bryan Herta Autosport	12	0	1	3	2	322	4th
2014	F1600 Championship Series	Team Pelfrey	14	3	1	4	8	492	**1st**
2015	U.S. F2000 National Championship	Team Pelfrey	16	0	0	0	0	186	10th
2016	U.S. F2000 National Championship	John Cummiskey Racing	12	0	0	0	0	137	11th
2017	U.S. F2000 National Championship	Team Pelfrey	7	0	0	0	0	72	17th
2021	W Series	M. Forbes Motorsport	8	0	0	0	0	3	17th
2021	Michelin Le Mans Cup - LMP3	Mühlner Motorsport	1	0	0	0	0	0.5	41st
2021	Ligier European Series - JS2 R	Orhes Racing	2	0	0	0	0	16	14th
2022	W Series	Puma W Series Team	1	0	0	0	0	0	19th

=== Complete W Series results ===
(key) (Races in bold indicate pole position) (Races in italics indicate fastest lap)

Year	Team	1	2	3	4	5	6	7	8	DC	Points
2021	M. Forbes Motorsport	SPI1; 10	SPI2; 14	SIL; 15	BUD; 11	SPA; DNS	ZAN; 15	AUS1; 16	AUS2; 9	17th	3
2022	Puma W Series Team	MIA1	MIA2	BCN	SIL	LEC	BUD	SGP; 16		19th	0
