= Emely de Heus =

Dutch racing driver (born 2003)

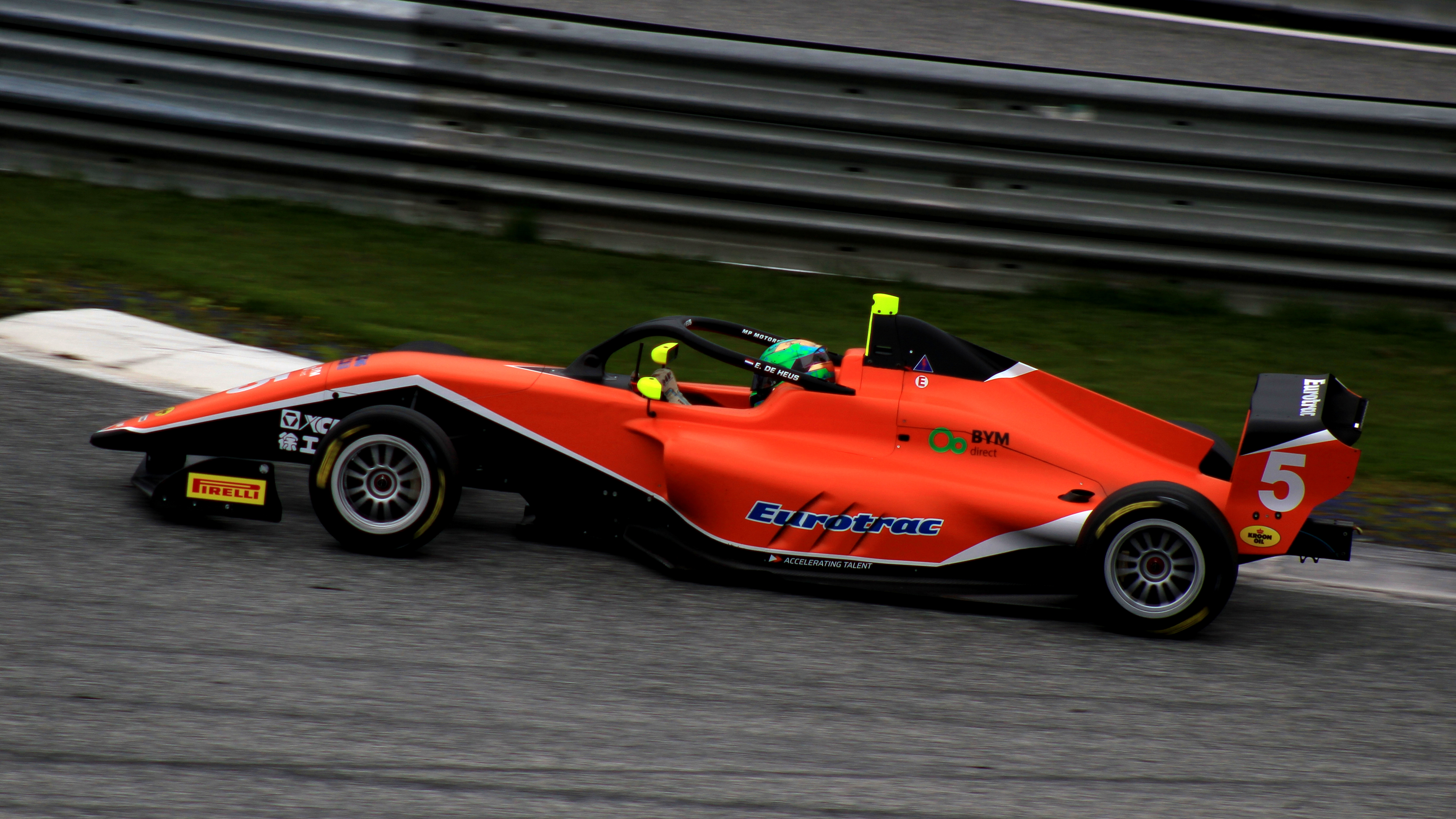
- De Heus in 2023.
- Nationality: (Netherlands) Dutch
- Born: 10 February 2003 (age 23) Mijnsheerenland, South Holland, Netherlands

Porsche Carrera Cup Germany career
- Debut season: 2025
- Current team: ID Racing
- Car number: 44
- Starts: 10 (10 entries)
- Wins: 0
- Podiums: 0
- Poles: 0
- Fastest laps: 0
- Best finish: 27th in 2025

Previous series
- 2025 2023–2024 2024 2023 2023 2022 2021: Dubai 24 Hour; F1 Academy; Eurocup-3; Formula 4 UAE Championship; Formula Pro USA; W Series; F4 Spanish Championship

Emely de Heus (Dutch pronunciation: [ˈeːməli də ˈɦøːs]; born 10 February 2003) is a Dutch racing driver. She currently competes for ID Racing in the Porsche Carrera Cup Germany series. De Heus is best known for her two seasons racing in F1 Academy for MP Motorsport.

== Personal life ==
De Heus was born in Mijnsheerenland, Netherlands. Her father is Bert de Heus, a veteran amateur driver in the 24H Series endurance racing championship. Her family owns and operates De Heus Tractors, based in Mijnsheerenland. Her racing heroes growing up were Michael Schumacher and Kimi Räikkönen.

In July 2026, De Heus gave birth to her first child.

== Career ==
=== Karting ===
De Heus competed in the 2019 and 2020 Rotax Max Challenge International Trophy in karting. In 2019, she secured four points and finished in 27th position overall. In 2020, she improved to 23rd place with 45 points. In February 2020, she won the Dutch Wintercup in Senior Karting at Berghem. That same year, she amassed 239 points in the Dutch Rotax Max Senior National Championship, finishing fourth overall.

=== F4 Spanish Championship ===
For the 2021 season, de Heus made her debut in single seater racing in the F4 Spanish Championship. She competed for Dutch team, MP Motorsport.

De Heus competed in all 21 races of the season. She finished in 29th place in the drivers standings and won the 2021 Female Trophy.

=== W Series ===
In early 2022, de Heus was announced as a competitor for the 2022 W Series season. In February she completed a test at Inde Motorsports Ranch, Arizona and also drove at the March test at Circuit de Barcelona-Catalunya in Spain where she completed 134 laps. De Heus competed for Sirin Racing alongside fellow Dutch racer Beitske Visser. Her best result was tenth in the first round of the season in Miami.

=== Formula 4 UAE Championship ===
In January 2023, it was announced that de Heus would compete in the 2023 Formula 4 UAE Championship with MP Motorsport. Her best finish was 21st place at Kuwait Motor Town.

=== F1 Academy ===
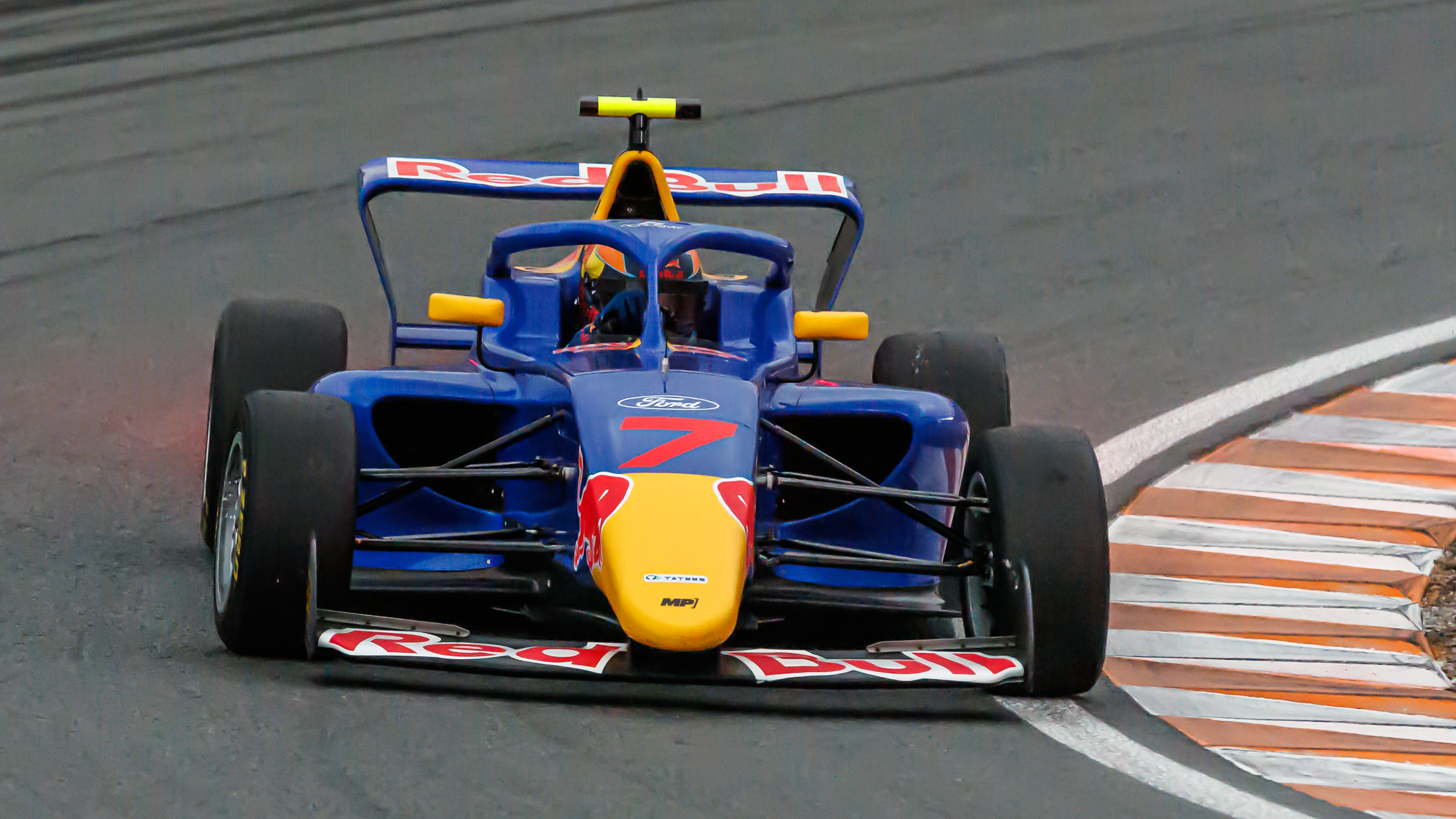
De Heus competing in an F1 Academy race at Zandvoort in 2024.

In March 2023, de Heus was announced as a driver for the brand new F1 Academy series and competed with MP Motorsport in 2023. De Heus won her first race in the series at Catalunya. For 2024, she re-signed with MP Motorsport and joined the Red Bull Academy Programme. She was sponsored by Red Bull GmbH and Ford.

De Heus scored her best result in the final round at Abu Dhabi, with a fourth-place finish in race 1. De Heus finished the season in 11th place with 29 points. As a result of competing in two seasons, de Heus was ineligible to compete in the 2025 championship so she departed F1 Academy and was replaced by Chloe Chambers.

=== Eurocup-3 ===
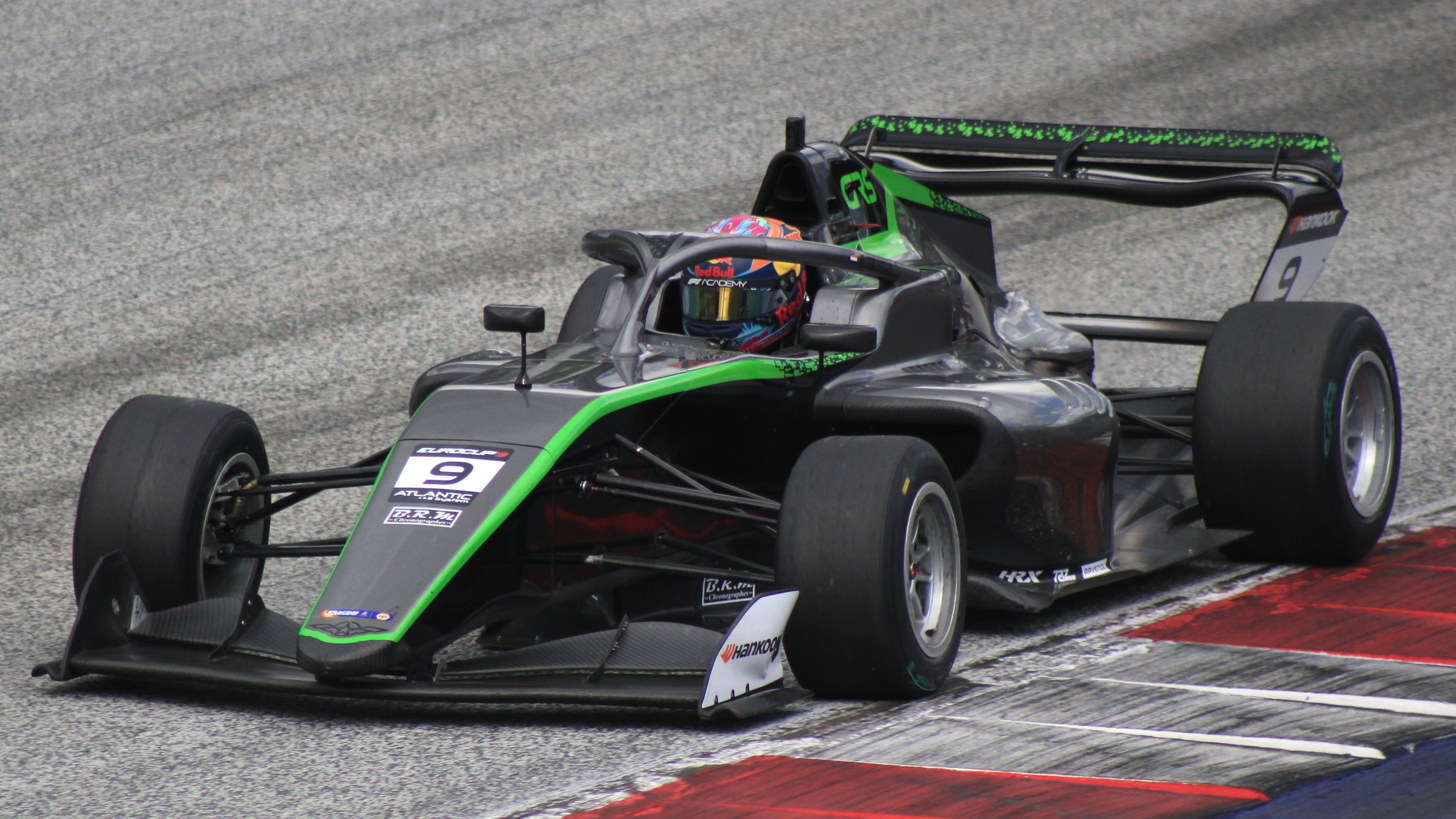
De Heus racing at the Red Bull Ring during the 2024 Eurocup-3 season.

Alongside her commitments in F1 Academy, de Heus joined the Eurocup-3 series for seven races. Initially she joined GRS Team as a replacement driver for Nikola Tsolov. After her first two races with the team at second round of the season, de Heus would return to race for GRS Team at three further weekends at Portugal, Netherlands and at the final round of the season at the Circuit de Catalunya.

=== 24H Series ===
De Heus joined WS Racing to compete in the 2025 Dubai 24 Hour racing a BMW M4 alongside Jeroen Bleekemolen, George King, Bernd Küpper and Keith Gatehouse. The race is the first of two rounds of the 2025 Middle East Trophy, a prequel to the 2025 24H Series season. The team retired from the race in hour eight following a car fire whilst de Heus was at the wheel.

=== Porsche Carrera Cup Germany ===
In February 2025, de Heus announced her switch to the Porsche Carrera Cup Germany, where she competed in the 2025 season for ID Racing. The Dutchwoman was forced to withdraw from the championship mid-season with an autoimmune disease.

== Karting record ==
=== Karting career summary ===
Season	Series	Team	Position
2015	SKUSA SuperNationals XIX - TaG Cadet	Team PDB Kart	48th
2019	BNL Karting Series - Rotax Senior		
2019	Rotax Max Euro Trophy - Senior Max	JJ Racing	27th
2020	Rotax Max Euro Trophy - Senior Max	JJ Racing	25th
2020	Rotax Max Challenge Grand Finals - Senior Max		23rd

== Racing record ==
=== Racing career summary ===
Season	Series	Team	Races	Wins	Poles	F/Laps	Podiums	Points	Position
2021	F4 Spanish Championship	MP Motorsport	21	0	0	0	0	0	29th
2022	W Series	Sirin Racing	7	0	0	0	0	1	17th
2023	Formula 4 UAE Championship	MP Motorsport	9	0	0	0	0	0	43rd
2023	F1 Academy	MP Motorsport	21	1	1	0	2	87	9th
2023	Formula Pro USA Western Championship - FPUSA-4	Jensen Motorsports	2	0	0	0	0	10	7th
2024	F1 Academy	MP Motorsport	14	0	0	0	0	29	11th
2024	Eurocup-3	GRS Team	7	0	0	0	0	0	29th
2024	Supercar Challenge - Supersport	Ferry Monster Autosport	6	0	0	0	3	86	6th
2025	Middle East Trophy - GT4	WS Racing	1	0	0	0	0	0	NC
2025	Porsche Carrera Cup Germany	ID Racing	10	0	0	0	0	2	27th

* Season still in progress.

=== Complete F4 Spanish Championship results ===
(key) (Races in bold indicate pole position) (Races in italics indicate fastest lap)

Year	Team	1	2	3	4	5	6	7	8	9	10	11	12	13	14	15	16	17	18	19	20	21	DC	Points
2021	MP Motorsport	SPA; 1; 24	SPA; 2; 23	SPA; 3; 21	NAV; 1; 22	NAV; 2; 20	NAV; 3; 21	ALG; 1; 18	ALG; 2; 21	ALG; 3; 19	ARA; 1; 16	ARA; 2; 20	ARA; 3; 17	CRT; 1; 14	CRT; 2; 19	CRT; 3; 21†	JER; 1; 17	JER; 2; 19	JER; 3; 20	CAT; 1; 20	CAT; 2; 16	CAT; 3; 22	29th	0

=== Complete W Series results ===
(key) (Races in bold indicate pole position) (Races in italics indicate fastest lap)

Year	Team	1	2	3	4	5	6	7	DC	Points
2022	Sirin Racing	MIA1; 10	MIA2; 12	CAT; 14	SIL; 15	LEC; 16	HUN; 16	SIN; 13	17th	1

=== Complete Formula 4 UAE Championship results ===
(key) (Races in bold indicate pole position) (Races in italics indicate fastest lap)

Year	Team	1	2	3	4	5	6	7	8	9	10	11	12	13	14	15	Pos	Points
2023	MP Motorsport	DUB1; 1; 27	DUB1; 2; 29	DUB1; 3 Ret	KMT1; 1; 26	KMT1; 2; 30	KMT1; 3; 31	KMT2; 1 Ret	KMT2; 2; 21	KMT2; 3; 25	DUB2; 1	DUB2; 2	DUB2; 3	YMC; 1	YMC; 2	YMC; 3	43rd	0

=== Complete F1 Academy results ===
(key) (Races in bold indicate pole position; races in italics indicate fastest lap)

Year	Team	1	2	3	4	5	6	7	8	9	10	11	12	13	14	15	16	17	18	19	20	21	DC	Points
2023	MP Motorsport	RBR; 1 Ret	RBR; 2; 6	RBR; 3; 12	CRT; 1; 14	CRT; 2 Ret	CRT; 3; 10	**CAT**; **1**; 1	CAT; 2; 8	CAT; 3; 6	ZAN; 1; 5	ZAN; 2; 5	ZAN; 3; 2	MNZ; 1; 6	MNZ; 2; 12†	MNZ; 3; 9	LEC; 1; 14	LEC; 2; 9	LEC; 3; 12	COA; 1 Ret	COA; 2; 10	COA; 3; 7	9th	87
2024	MP Motorsport	JED; 1; 12	JED; 2; 12	MIA; 1; 11	MIA; 2; 12	CAT; 1; 6	CAT; 2; 10	ZAN; 1; 15	ZAN; 2; 13	SIN; 1; 15	SIN; 2; 10	LSL; 1; 10	LSL; 2 C	YMC; 1; 4	YMC; 2; 8	YMC; 3; 9							11th	29

=== Complete Eurocup-3 results ===
(key) (Races in bold indicate pole position; races in italics indicate fastest lap)

Year	Team	1	2	3	4	5	6	7	8	9	10	11	12	13	14	15	16	17	DC	Points
2024	GRS Team	SPA; 1	SPA; 2	RBR; 1; 13	RBR; 2; 15	POR; 1 Ret	POR; 2 DNS	POR; 3; 14	LEC; 1	LEC; 2	ZAN; 1; 17	ZAN; 2; 23	ARA; 1	ARA; 2	JER; 1	JER; 2	CAT; 1 DNS	CAT; 2 Ret	29th	0

=== Complete Porsche Carrera Cup Germany results ===
(key) (Races in bold indicate pole position) (Races in italics indicate fastest lap)

Year	Team	1	2	3	4	5	6	7	8	9	10	11	12	13	14	15	16	DC	Points
2025	ID Racing	IMO; 1 DSQ	IMO; 2; 31	SPA; 1; 28	SPA; 2; 26	ZAN; 1; 25	ZAN; 2; 16	NOR; 1 Ret	NOR; 2; 23	NÜR; 1; 21	NÜR; 2 Ret	SAC; 1	SAC; 2	RBR; 1	RBR; 2	HOC; 1	HOC; 2	27th	2
