= 2022 W Series Silverstone round =

- Event 3 of 6 of the 2022 W Series
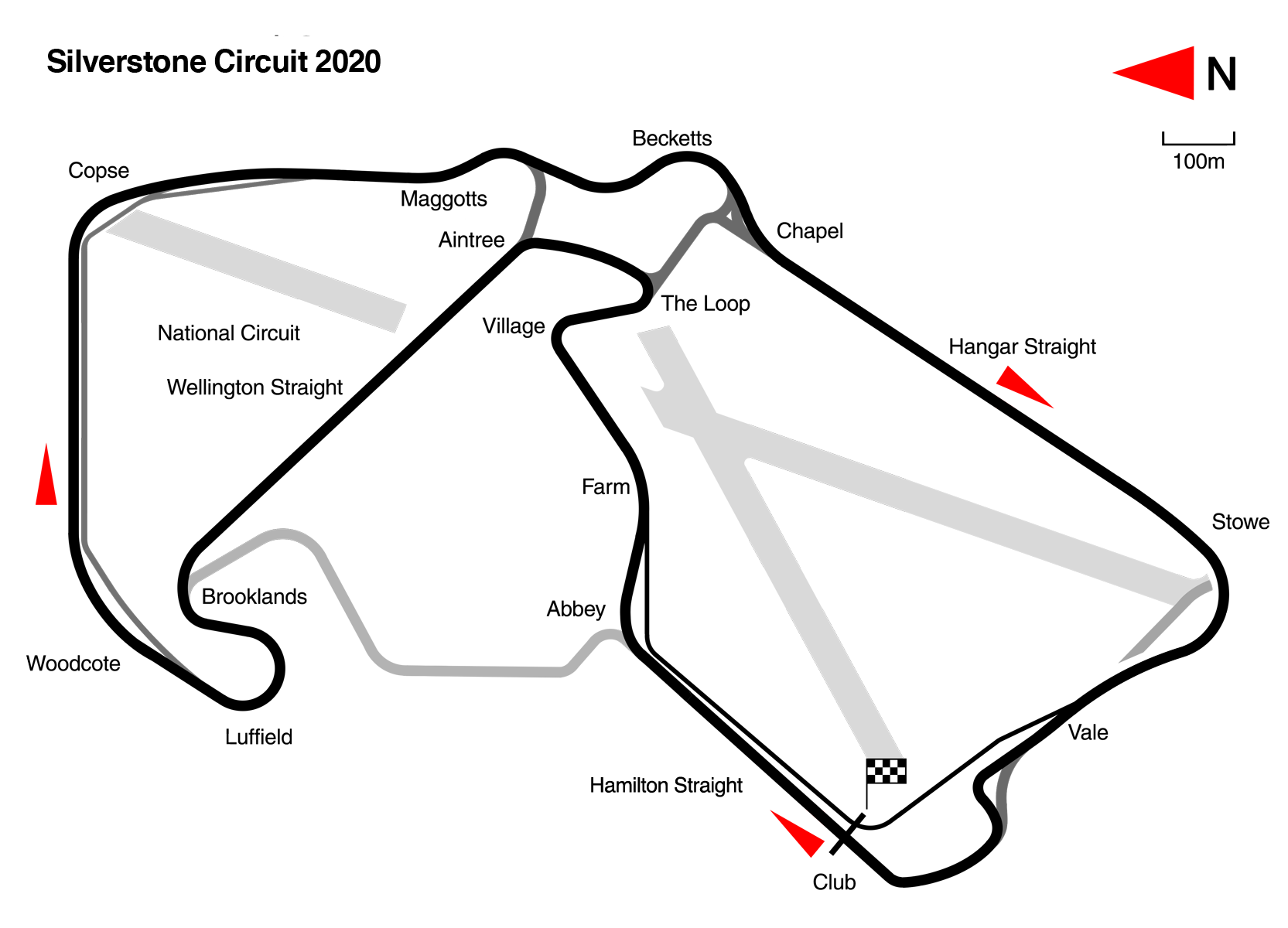

Race details
- Date: 2 July 2022
- Official name: 2022 W Series Silverstone round
- Location: Silverstone Circuit, Silverstone, Northamptonshire, England
- Course: Permanent circuit
- Course length: 5.891 km (3.661 miles)
- Distance: 17 laps, 100.147 km (62.237 miles)
- Weather: Overcast

Pole position
Driver	(United Kingdom) Jamie Chadwick	Jenner Racing
- Time: 1:56.758

Fastest lap
Driver	(United Kingdom) Jamie Chadwick	Jenner Racing
- Time: 1:57.149

Podium
First	(United Kingdom) Jamie Chadwick	Jenner Racing
Second	(Finland) Emma Kimiläinen	Puma W Series Team
Third	(United Kingdom) Abbi Pulling	Racing X

The 2022 W Series Silverstone round was the third round of a planned eight in the 2022 W Series, and took place at the Silverstone Circuit in the United Kingdom on the 2nd of July 2022. The event was an undercard to the 2022 Formula One World Championship round at the same circuit.

== Classification ==
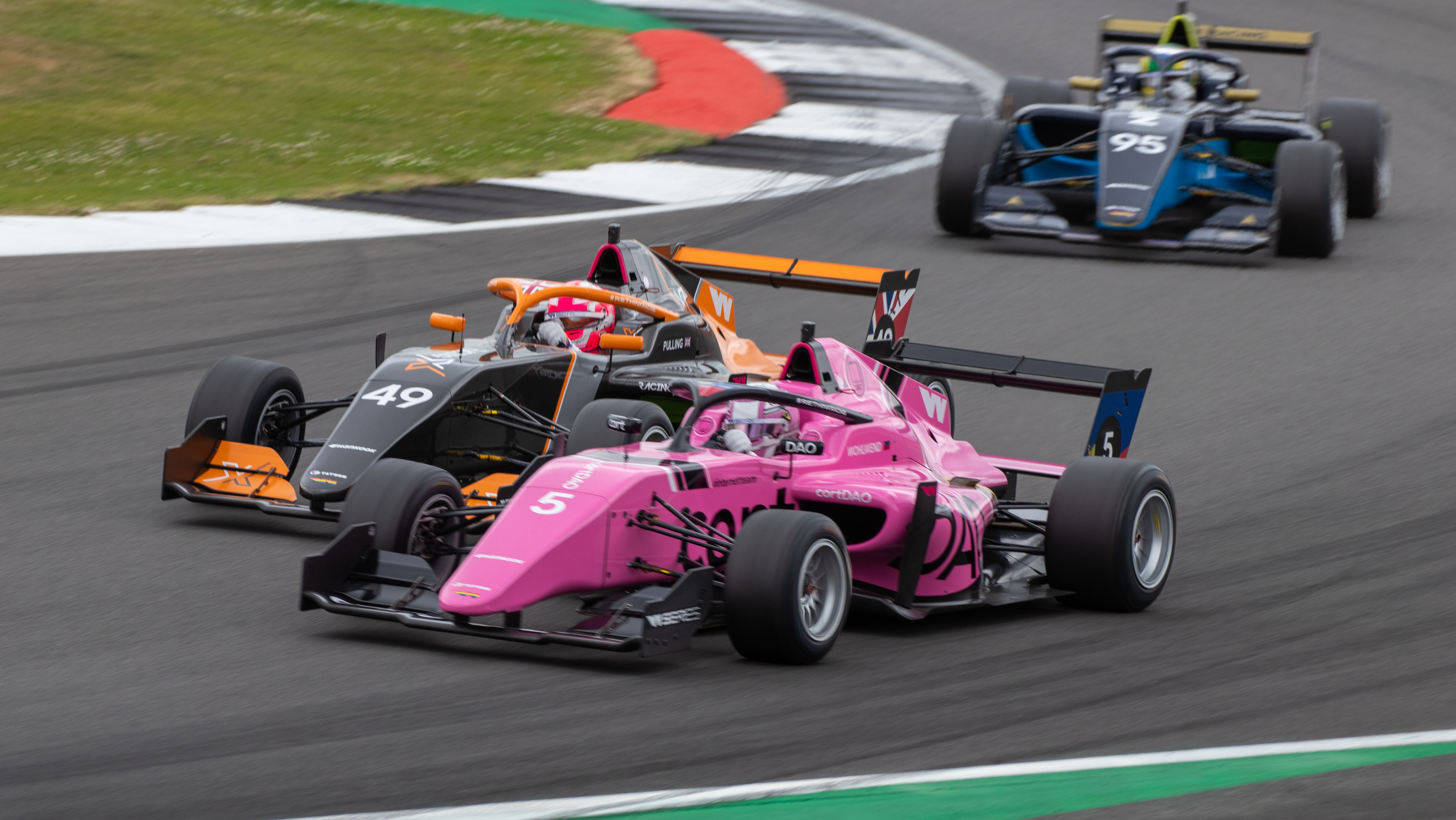
Wohlwend, Pulling and Visser battle.

=== Practice ===
Session	No.	Driver	Commercial entrant	Time	Source
Practice 1	55	(United Kingdom) Jamie Chadwick	Jenner Racing	1:56.696	

=== Qualifying ===
Pos.	No.	Driver	Commercial entrant	Time/Gap
1	55	(United Kingdom) Jamie Chadwick	Jenner Racing	1:56.758
2	7	(Finland) Emma Kimiläinen	Puma W Series Team	+0.219
3	27	(United Kingdom) Alice Powell	Bristol Street Motors Racing	+0.250
4	49	(United Kingdom) Abbi Pulling	Racing X	+0.554
5	95	(Netherlands) Beitske Visser	Sirin Racing	+0.608
6	5	(Liechtenstein) Fabienne Wohlwend	CortDAO W Series Team	+0.683
7	19	(Spain) Marta García	CortDAO W Series Team	+0.857
8	44	(United Kingdom) Abbie Eaton	Scuderia W	+0.861
9	26	(United Kingdom) Sarah Moore	Scuderia W	+0.861
10	21	(United Kingdom) Jessica Hawkins	Bristol Street Motors Racing	+0.914
11	22	(Spain) Belén García	Quantfury W Series Team	+1.003
12	63	(Czech Republic) Tereza Bábíčková	Puma W Series Team	+1.152
13	32	(Spain) Nerea Martí	Quantfury W Series Team	+1.380^{1}
14	8	(United States) Chloe Chambers	Jenner Racing	+1.414
15	97	(Brazil) Bruna Tomaselli	Racing X	+1.570
16	10	(Japan) Juju Noda	W Series Academy	+2.822
17	9	(Philippines) Bianca Bustamante	W Series Academy	+3.884
18	4	(Netherlands) Emely de Heus	Sirin Racing	+4.968

- ^1 – Nerea Martí received a two-place grid penalty.

=== Race ===
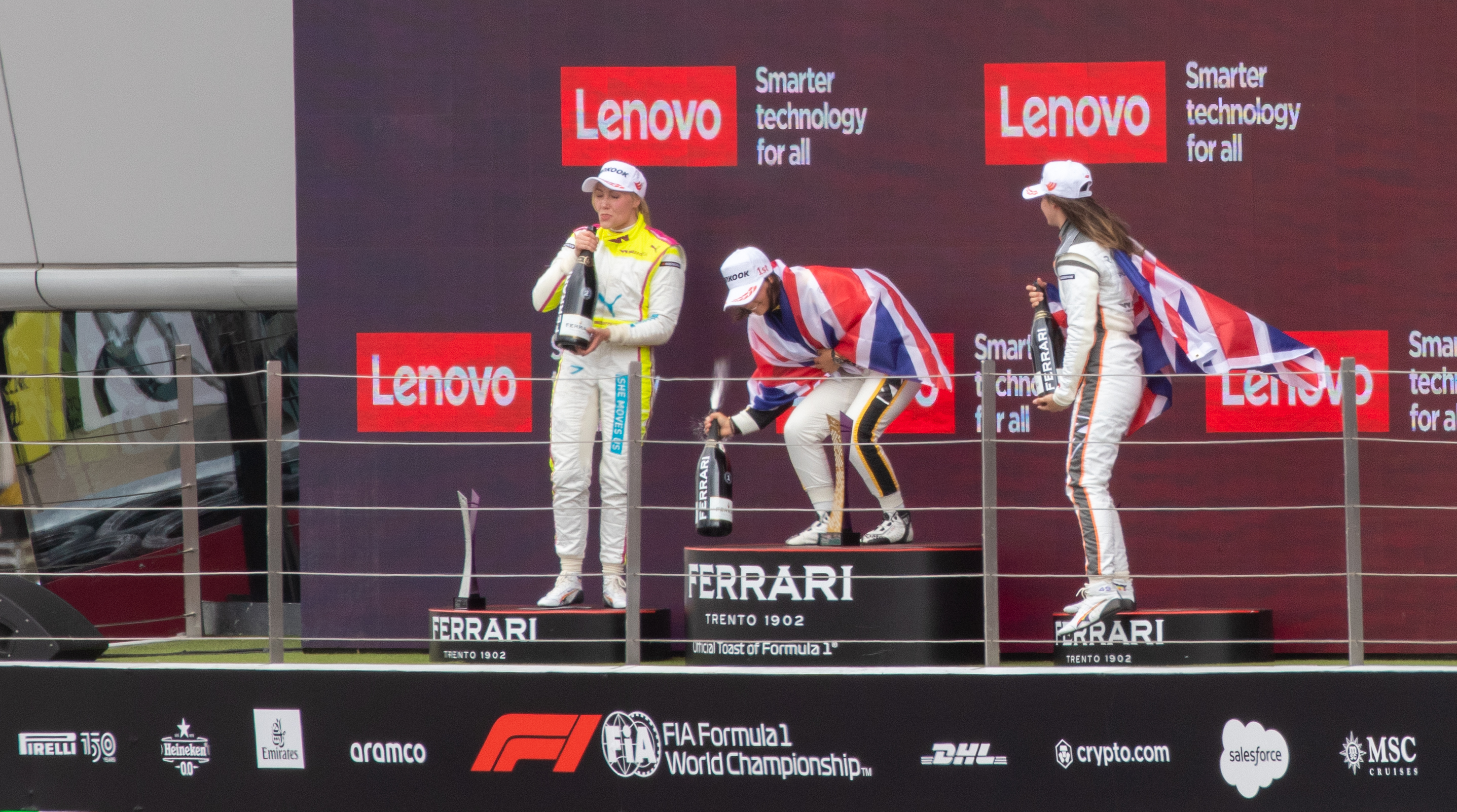
Podium celebrations.

Pos.	No.	Driver	Commercial entrant	Laps	Time/Retired	Grid	Pts
1	55	(United Kingdom) Jamie Chadwick	Jenner Racing	17	33:30.881	1	25
2	7	(Finland) Emma Kimiläinen	Puma W Series Team	17	+19.558	2	18
3	49	(United Kingdom) Abbi Pulling	Racing X	17	+20.962	4	15
4	5	(Liechtenstein) Fabienne Wohlwend	CortDAO W Series Team	17	+21.444	6	12
5	95	(Netherlands) Beitske Visser	Sirin Racing	17	+24.534	5	10
6	21	(United Kingdom) Jessica Hawkins	Bristol Street Motors Racing	17	+25.991	10	8
7	44	(United Kingdom) Abbie Eaton	Scuderia W	17	+27.069	8	6
8	22	(Spain) Belén García	Quantfury W Series Team	17	+27.848	11	4
9	32	(Spain) Nerea Martí	Quantfury W Series Team	17	+28.202	15	2
10	26	(United Kingdom) Sarah Moore	Scuderia W	17	+29.268	9	1
11	97	(Brazil) Bruna Tomaselli	Racing X	17	+35.645	14	
12	63	(Czech Republic) Tereza Bábíčková	Puma W Series Team	17	+36.190	12	
13	8	(United States) Chloe Chambers	Jenner Racing	17	+36.820	13	
14	27	(United Kingdom) Alice Powell	Bristol Street Motors Racing	17	+51.253	3	
15	4	(Netherlands) Emely de Heus	Sirin Racing	17	+53.222	18	
16	10	(Japan) Juju Noda	W Series Academy	17	+56.940	16	
17	9	(Philippines) Bianca Bustamante	W Series Academy	17	+1:09.172	17	
18	19	(Spain) Marta García	CortDAO W Series Team	15	+2 laps	7	
Fastest lap set by Jamie Chadwick: 1:57.149

== Championship standings ==
Pos.	Driver	Pts	Gap
1	(United Kingdom) Jamie Chadwick	100	
2	(United Kingdom) Abbi Pulling	53	-47
3	(Netherlands) Beitske Visser	41	-59
4	(Finland) Emma Kimiläinen	40	-60
5	(United Kingdom) Alice Powell	33	-67

== See also ==
- 2022 British Grand Prix
- 2022 Formula 2 Silverstone round
- 2022 Formula 3 Silverstone round

Previous race: 2022 W Series Barcelona round	W Series; 2022 season	Next race: 2022 W Series Le Castellet round
