= 2022 Singapore W Series round =

2022 W Series Singapore round
- Race 7 of 7 of the 2022 W Series

Race details
- Date: 2 October 2022
- Official name: 2022 W Series Singapore round
- Location: Marina Bay Street Circuit; Marina Bay, Singapore
- Course: Temporary street circuit
- Course length: 5.063 km (3.146 miles)
- Distance: 14 laps, 70.882 km (40.044 miles)

Pole position
Driver	(Spain) Marta García	CortDAO W Series Team
- Time: 2:30.762

Fastest lap
Driver	(United Kingdom) Alice Powell	Bristol Street Motors Racing
- Time: 2:13.986 on lap 5

Podium
First	(Netherlands) Beitske Visser	Sirin Racing
Second	(United Kingdom) Alice Powell	Bristol Street Motors Racing
Third	(Spain) Marta García	CortDAO W Series Team

The 2022 W Series Singapore round was the final round of the 2022 W Series, which took place at the Marina Bay Street Circuit, Singapore. The event was an undercard to the 2022 Formula One World Championship round at the same circuit.

Originally scheduled to be held at the Suzuka International Racing Course, the event was relocated due to "unforeseeable operational challenges". The round was planned to be the sixth of eight in the 2022 championship, before all subsequent rounds were cancelled due to financial issues. This was the only W Series event that took place in Asia, and it was the final championship event held before it went into administration.

== Classification ==
=== Practice ===
Session	No.	Driver	Team	Time
Practice 1	55	(United Kingdom) Jamie Chadwick	Jenner Racing	2:13.529

=== Qualifying ===
Pos.	No.	Driver	Team	Time/Gap
1	19	(Spain) Marta García	CortDAO W Series Team	2:30.762
2	95	(Netherlands) Beitske Visser	Sirin Racing	+0.087
3	27	(United Kingdom) Alice Powell	Bristol Street Motors Racing	+0.649
4	22	(Spain) Belén García	Quantfury W Series Team	+1.383
5	21	(United Kingdom) Jessica Hawkins	Bristol Street Motors Racing	+1.648
6	49	(United Kingdom) Abbi Pulling	Racing X	+1.685
7	26	(United Kingdom) Sarah Moore	Scuderia W	+2.053
8	55	(United Kingdom) Jamie Chadwick	Jenner Racing	+2.210
9	5	(Liechtenstein) Fabienne Wohlwend	CortDAO W Series Team	+2.754
10	7	(Finland) Emma Kimiläinen	Puma W Series Team	+3.967
11	8	(United States) Chloe Chambers	Jenner Racing	+4.012
12	44	(United Kingdom) Abbie Eaton	Scuderia W	+4.768
13	17	(Norway) Ayla Ågren	Puma W Series Team	+5.509
14	4	(Netherlands) Emely de Heus	Sirin Racing	+5.510
15	32	(Spain) Nerea Martí	Quantfury W Series Team	+6.110
16	97	(Brazil) Bruna Tomaselli	Racing X	+7.007
17	10	(Japan) Juju Noda	W Series Academy	+12.805
18	9	(Philippines) Bianca Bustamante	W Series Academy	+13.653

=== Race ===
Pos.	No.	Driver	Team	Laps	Time/Retired	Grid	Pts
1	95	(Netherlands) Beitske Visser	Sirin Racing	14	33:10.533	2	25
2	27	(United Kingdom) Alice Powell	Bristol Street Motors Racing	14	+0.387	3	18
3	19	(Spain) Marta García	CortDAO W Series Team	14	+1.445	1	15
4	22	(Spain) Belén García	Quantfury W Series Team	14	+2.207	4	12
5	21	(United Kingdom) Jessica Hawkins	Bristol Street Motors Racing	14	+3.404	5	10
6	49	(United Kingdom) Abbi Pulling	Racing X	14	+3.441	6	8
7	26	(United Kingdom) Sarah Moore	Scuderia W	14	+3.529	7	6
8	5	(Liechtenstein) Fabienne Wohlwend	CortDAO W Series Team	14	+5.312	9	4
9	7	(Finland) Emma Kimiläinen	Puma W Series Team	14	+5.566	10	2
10	44	(United Kingdom) Abbie Eaton	Scuderia W	14	+7.920	12	1
11	8	(United States) Chloe Chambers	Jenner Racing	14	+8.470	11	
12	32	(Spain) Nerea Martí	Quantfury W Series Team	14	+9.628	15	
13	4	(Netherlands) Emely de Heus	Sirin Racing	14	+10.093	14	
14	97	(Brazil) Bruna Tomaselli	Racing X	14	+10.397	16	
15	9	(Philippines) Bianca Bustamante	W Series Academy	14	+13.876	18	
16	17	(Norway) Ayla Ågren	Puma W Series Team	14	+14.963	13	
DNF	55	(United Kingdom) Jamie Chadwick	Jenner Racing	11	Accident	8	
DNF	10	(Japan) Juju Noda	W Series Academy	0	Collision	17	
Fastest lap set by Alice Powell: 2:13.986

== See also ==
- 2022 Singapore Grand Prix

Previous race: 2022 W Series Budapest round	W Series; 2022 season	Next race: None
