= 2022 Barcelona W Series round =

2022 W Series Barcelona round
- Race 3 of 7 of the 2022 W Series

Race details
- Date: 21 May 2022
- Official name: 2022 W Series Barcelona round
- Location: Circuit de Barcelona-Catalunya, Montmeló, Catalonia, Spain
- Course: Permanent circuit
- Course length: 4.675 km (2.905 miles)
- Distance: 18 laps, 84.150 km (52.290 miles)

Pole position
Driver	(United Kingdom) Jamie Chadwick	Jenner Racing
- Time: 1:44.951

Fastest lap
Driver	(United Kingdom) Jamie Chadwick	Jenner Racing
- Time: 1:47.367

Podium
First	(United Kingdom) Jamie Chadwick	Jenner Racing
Second	(United Kingdom) Abbi Pulling	Racing X
Third	(United Kingdom) Alice Powell	Bristol Street Motors Racing

The 2022 W Series Barcelona round was the second round of eight in the 2022 W Series, and took place at the Circuit de Barcelona-Catalunya in Spain on 21 May 2022. The event was an undercard to the 2022 Formula One World Championship round at the same circuit.

== Report ==
=== Background ===
For the first of two events in 2022, the Tatuus–Toyota FT-60 chassis and engine combination would be used instead of the usual Tatuus–Alfa Romeo F3 T-318 car due to logistical hurdles related to the tight turnarounds between events.

Jamie Chadwick led the drivers' championship on 50 points, 27 points ahead of Nerea Martí. Jenner Racing led the teams' championship on 51 points, 10 points ahead of the Quantfury W Series Team.

== Classification ==
=== Practice ===
Session	No.	Driver	Team	Time	Source
Free Practice	55	(United Kingdom) Jamie Chadwick	Jenner Racing	1:45.517	

=== Qualifying ===
Pos.	No.	Driver	Team	Time/Gap
1	55	(United Kingdom) Jamie Chadwick	Jenner Racing	1:44.951
2	27	(United Kingdom) Alice Powell	Bristol Street Motors Racing	+0.329
3	49	(United Kingdom) Abbi Pulling	Racing X	+0.459
4	95	(Netherlands) Beitske Visser	Sirin Racing	+0.498
5	7	(Finland) Emma Kimiläinen	Puma W Series Team	+0.598
6	22	(Spain) Belén García	Quantfury W Series Team	+0.611
7	19	(Spain) Marta García	CortDAO W Series Team	+0.679
8	26	(United Kingdom) Sarah Moore	Scuderia W	+0.685
9	21	(United Kingdom) Jessica Hawkins	Bristol Street Motors Racing	+0.708
10	5	(Liechtenstein) Fabienne Wohlwend (Note: Wohlwend races with a Swiss licence however is a Liechtenstein citizen and passport holder.)	CortDAO W Series Team	+0.931
11	32	(Spain) Nerea Martí	Quantfury W Series Team	+1.186
12	97	(Brazil) Bruna Tomaselli	Racing X	+1.224
13	63	(Czech Republic) Tereza Bábíčková	Puma W Series Team	+1.228
14	10	(Japan) Juju Noda (Note: Noda races with a Danish licence however is a Japanese citizen and passport holder.)	W Series Academy	+1.234
15	4	(Netherlands) Emely de Heus	Sirin Racing	+1.562
16	8	(United States) Chloe Chambers	Jenner Racing	+1.659
17	9	(Philippines) Bianca Bustamante	W Series Academy	+2.466
18	44	(United Kingdom) Abbie Eaton	Scuderia W	+2.566

=== Race ===
Pos.	No.	Driver	Team	Laps	Time/Retired	Grid	Pts
1	55	(United Kingdom) Jamie Chadwick	Jenner Racing	18	32:27.882	1	25
2	49	(United Kingdom) Abbi Pulling	Racing X	18	+0.526	3	18
3	27	(United Kingdom) Alice Powell	Bristol Street Motors Racing	18	+1.210	2	15
4	7	(Finland) Emma Kimiläinen	Puma W Series Team	18	+6.924	5	12
5	95	(Netherlands) Beitske Visser	Sirin Racing	18	+10.815	4	10
6	19	(Spain) Marta García	CortDAO W Series Team	18	+11.457	7	8
7	22	(Spain) Belén García	Quantfury W Series Team	18	+12.398	6	6
8	32	(Spain) Nerea Martí	Quantfury W Series Team	18	+13.513	11	4
9	5	(Liechtenstein) Fabienne Wohlwend	CortDAO W Series Team	18	+15.790	10	2
10	26	(United Kingdom) Sarah Moore	Scuderia W	18	+16.361	8	1
11	21	(United Kingdom) Jessica Hawkins	Bristol Street Motors Racing	18	+26.634	9	
12	97	(Brazil) Bruna Tomaselli	Racing X	18	+26.911	12	
13	10	(Japan) Juju Noda	W Series Academy	18	+28.019	14	
14	4	(Netherlands) Emely de Heus	Sirin Racing	18	+36.474	15	
15	9	(Philippines) Bianca Bustamante	W Series Academy	18	+40.022	17	
16	44	(United Kingdom) Abbie Eaton	Scuderia W	18	+40.558	18	
17	63	(Czech Republic) Tereza Bábíčková	Puma W Series Team	18	+41.198	13	
Ret	8	(United States) Chloe Chambers	Jenner Racing	17	Spun out	16	
Fastest lap set by Jamie Chadwick: 1:47.367

- ^1 – Driver did not finish the race, but was classified having completed 90% of the race distance.

== Championship standings ==
Drivers' Championship standings

Pos.	Driver	Pts	Gap
1	(United Kingdom) Jamie Chadwick	75	
2	(United Kingdom) Abbi Pulling	38	-37
3	(United Kingdom) Alice Powell	33	-42
4	(Netherlands) Beitske Visser	31	-44
5	(Spain) Nerea Martí	27	-48

Teams' Championship standings

Pos.	Team	Pts	Gap
1	Jenner Racing	76	
2	Bristol Street Motors Racing	51	-25
2	Quantfury W Series Team	51	-25
4	Racing X	48	-28
5	Sirin Racing	32	-44

- Note: Only the top five positions are included.

== See also ==
- 2022 Spanish Grand Prix

== Notes ==
Previous race: 2022 W Series Miami round	W Series; 2022 season	Next race: 2022 W Series Silverstone round
