= 2022 W Series Le Castellet round =

- Event 4 of 6 of the 2022 W Series

Race details
- Date: 23 July 2022
- Official name: 2022 W Series Le Castellet round
- Location: Circuit Paul Ricard, Le Castellet, Provence-Alpes-Côte d'Azur, France
- Course: Permanent circuit
- Course length: 5.842 km (3.63 miles)
- Distance: 14 laps, 81.788 km (50.820 miles)
- Weather: Sunny, 33°C

Pole position
Driver	(Netherlands) Beitske Visser (Note: Jamie Chadwick set the fastest time in qualifying but received a grid penalty for crossing the pit exit line – Beitske Visser started from pole position.)	Sirin Racing
- Time: 2:02.246

Fastest lap
Driver	(United Kingdom) Jamie Chadwick	Jenner Racing
- Time: 2:02.893

Podium
First	(United Kingdom) Jamie Chadwick	Jenner Racing
Second	(Spain) Belén García	Quantfury W Series Team
Third	(Spain) Nerea Martí	Quantfury W Series Team

The 2022 W Series Le Castellet round was the fourth round of a planned eight in the 2022 W Series, and took place at Circuit Paul Ricard in France on the 23rd of July 2022. The event was an undercard to the 2022 Formula One World Championship round at the same circuit.

== Classification ==
=== Practice ===
Session	No.	Driver	Commercial entrant	Time	Source
Practice 1	95	(Netherlands) Beitske Visser	Sirin Racing	2:03.744	

=== Qualifying ===
Pos.	No.	Driver	Commercial entrant	Time/Gap
1	55	(United Kingdom) Jamie Chadwick	Jenner Racing	2:02.235^{1}
2	95	(Netherlands) Beitske Visser	Sirin Racing	+0.011
3	32	(Spain) Nerea Martí	Quantfury W Series Team	+0.104
4	19	(Spain) Marta García	CortDAO W Series Team	+0.124
5	22	(Spain) Belén García	Quantfury W Series Team	+0.337
6	44	(United Kingdom) Abbie Eaton	Scuderia W	+0.683
7	5	(Liechtenstein) Fabienne Wohlwend	CortDAO W Series Team	+0.687
8	21	(United Kingdom) Jessica Hawkins	Bristol Street Motors Racing	+0.751
9	26	(United Kingdom) Sarah Moore	Scuderia W	+0.774
10	7	(Finland) Emma Kimiläinen	Puma W Series Team	+0.783
11	27	(United Kingdom) Alice Powell	Bristol Street Motors Racing	+0.904
12	49	(United Kingdom) Abbi Pulling	Racing X	+1.110
13	97	(Brazil) Bruna Tomaselli	Racing X	+1.240
14	10	(Japan) Juju Noda	W Series Academy	+1.436
15	63	(Czech Republic) Tereza Bábíčková	Puma W Series Team	+1.593
16	4	(Netherlands) Emely de Heus	Sirin Racing	+1.781
17	8	(United States) Chloe Chambers	Jenner Racing	+1.792
18	9	(Philippines) Bianca Bustamante	W Series Academy	+3.424

- ^1 – Chadwick was given a two-place grid penalty for crossing the pit exit line.

=== Race ===
Pos.	No.	Driver	Commercial entrant	Laps	Time/Retired	Grid	Pts
1	55	(United Kingdom) Jamie Chadwick	Jenner Racing	14	33:14.804	3	25
2	22	(Spain) Belén García	Quantfury W Series Team	14	+2.400	5	18
3	32	(Spain) Nerea Martí	Quantfury W Series Team	14	+3.233	2	15
4	95	(Netherlands) Beitske Visser	Sirin Racing	14	+5.581	1	12
5	27	(United Kingdom) Alice Powell	Bristol Street Motors Racing	14	+6.972	11	10
6	19	(Spain) Marta García	CortDAO W Series Team	14	+10.506	4	8
7	5	(Liechtenstein) Fabienne Wohlwend	CortDAO W Series Team	14	+12.126	7	6
8	26	(United Kingdom) Sarah Moore	Scuderia W	14	+13.061	9	4
9	49	(United Kingdom) Abbi Pulling	Racing X	14	+13.307	12	2
10	21	(United Kingdom) Jessica Hawkins	Bristol Street Motors Racing	14	+13.792	8	1
11	97	(Brazil) Bruna Tomaselli	Racing X	14	+15.199	13	
12	7	(Finland) Emma Kimiläinen	Puma W Series Team	14	+16.731	10	
13	10	(Japan) Juju Noda	W Series Academy	14	+17.493	14	
14	63	(Czech Republic) Tereza Bábíčková	Puma W Series Team	14	+23.715	15	
15	9	(Philippines) Bianca Bustamante	W Series Academy	14	+28.667	18	
16	4	(Netherlands) Emely de Heus	Sirin Racing	14	+1:02.536	16	
DNF	8	(United States) Chloe Chambers	Jenner Racing	3	Crash	17	
DNF	44	(United Kingdom) Abbie Eaton	Scuderia W	0	Crash	6	
Fastest lap set by Jamie Chadwick: 2:02.893

== Championship standings ==
Pos.	Driver	Pts	Gap
1	(United Kingdom) Jamie Chadwick	125	
2	(United Kingdom) Abbi Pulling	55	-70
3	(Netherlands) Beitske Visser	53	-72
4	(Spain) Belén García	46	-79
5	(Spain) Nerea Martí	44	-81

== See also ==
- 2022 French Grand Prix
- 2022 Formula 2 Le Castellet round

== Notes ==
Previous race: 2022 W Series Silverstone round	W Series; 2022 season	Next race: 2022 W Series Budapest round
