= Juju Noda =

Japanese racing driver (born 2006)

Juju Noda "Juju"
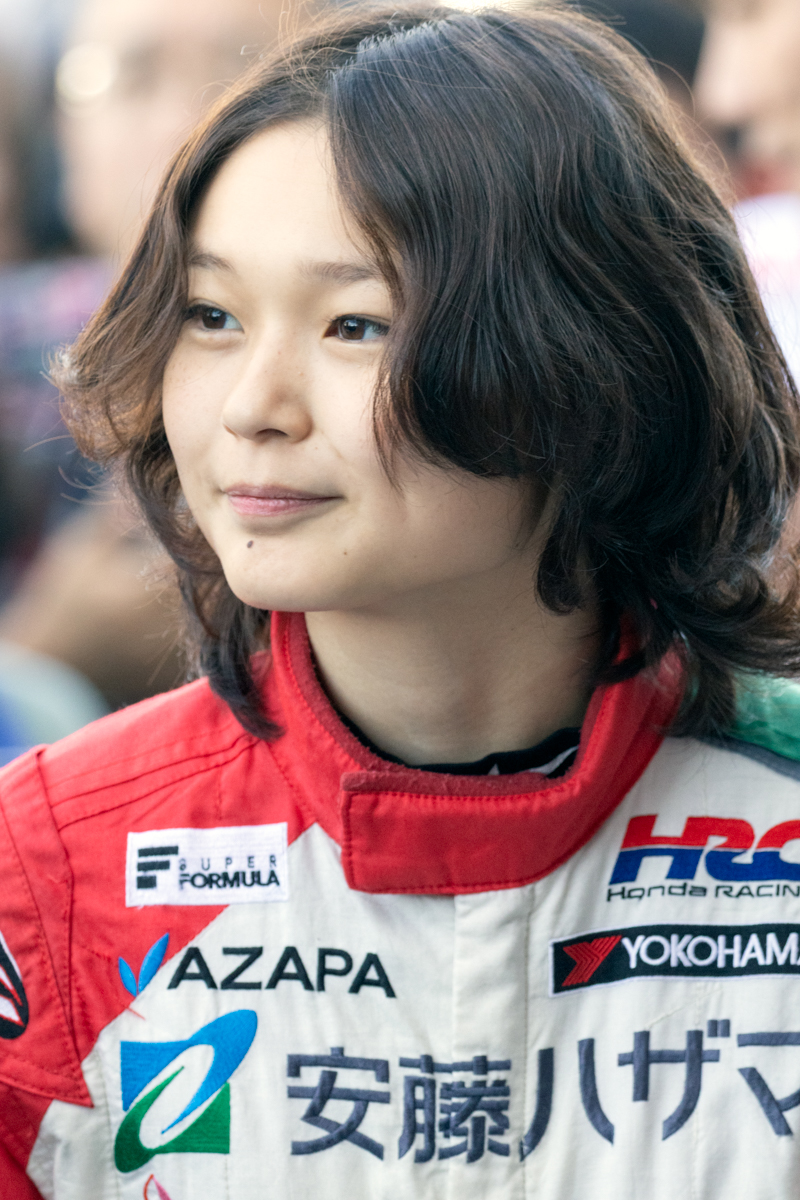
- Noda at the 2025 Super Formula Suzuka round
- Nationality: (Japan) Japanese
- Born: 2 February 2006 (age 20) Tokyo, Japan
- Relatives: Hideki Noda (father)

Super Formula career
- Debut season: 2024
- Current team: Triple Tree Racing
- Categorisation: FIA Silver
- Car number: 10
- Former teams: TGM Grand Prix
- Starts: 31
- Wins: 0
- Podiums: 0
- Poles: 0
- Fastest laps: 0

Previous series
- 2023 2022 2021, 2020 2021 2019: Euroformula Open; W Series; F4 Danish Championship; Formula 4 United States Championship; Lucas Oil Winter Race Series

Championship titles
- 2023 2023: F2000 Italian Formula Trophy; F2000 Italian Formula Trophy – Super Formula

Juju Noda (Japanese: 野田 樹潤, Hepburn: Noda Juju; born 2 February 2006), also known mononymously as "Juju", is a Japanese racing driver who is competing in the 2026 Super Formula Championship with Triple Tree Racing. She has previously competed in the W Series, and Euroformula Open. She is the daughter of former Formula 1 driver Hideki Noda.

== Early and personal life ==
Noda was born on 2 February 2006. She is the daughter of former Formula One driver Hideki Noda, and began karting at the age of three.

In 2018, Noda was featured in a micro-documentary created by Great Big Story.

== Career ==
=== Early career ===
Noda tested single-seater race cars on Japanese circuits from the age of nine. She made her official competition car debut in the 2019 Lucas Oil Winter Race Series, where she finished 14th overall.

=== F4 Danish Championship ===
Noda made her debut in the Formula 4 category in 2020, racing in the F4 Danish Championship with her family team, Noda Racing. She won her first ever race in the series, and finished sixth in the standings.

Noda continued in the championship in 2021, after a last minute switch from the F4 United States Championship. She finished seventh in the standings this year.

=== F4 United States Championship ===
In January 2021, it was announced that Noda would race for Jay Howard Driver Development in the 2021 Formula 4 United States Championship.

Noda was fastest in the practice session in Round 1 at Road Atlanta, however she then withdrew prior to qualifying. She did not appear at any more rounds.

=== W Series ===
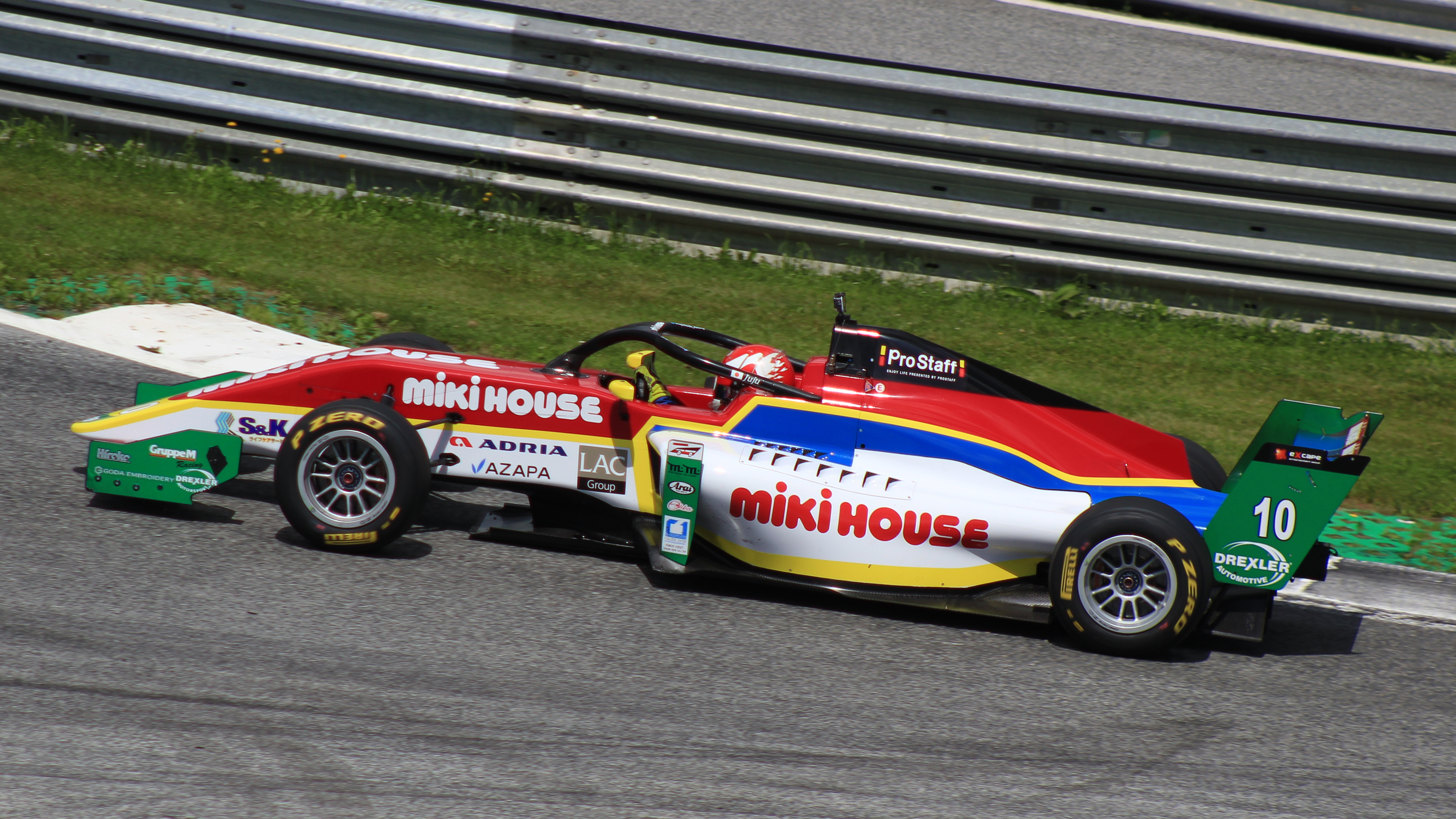
Noda competing in the 2022 Austrian Formula 3 Cup.

Noda appeared at the second pre-season test on 2–4 March 2022 at Barcelona, the only driver to do so who was not an automatic qualifier or who had attended the first test in Arizona, one month prior. The full W Series grid was announced on 22 March 2022, with Noda included. She would go on to score two points throughout the season, finishing fourteenth in the championship.

=== Euroformula Open ===
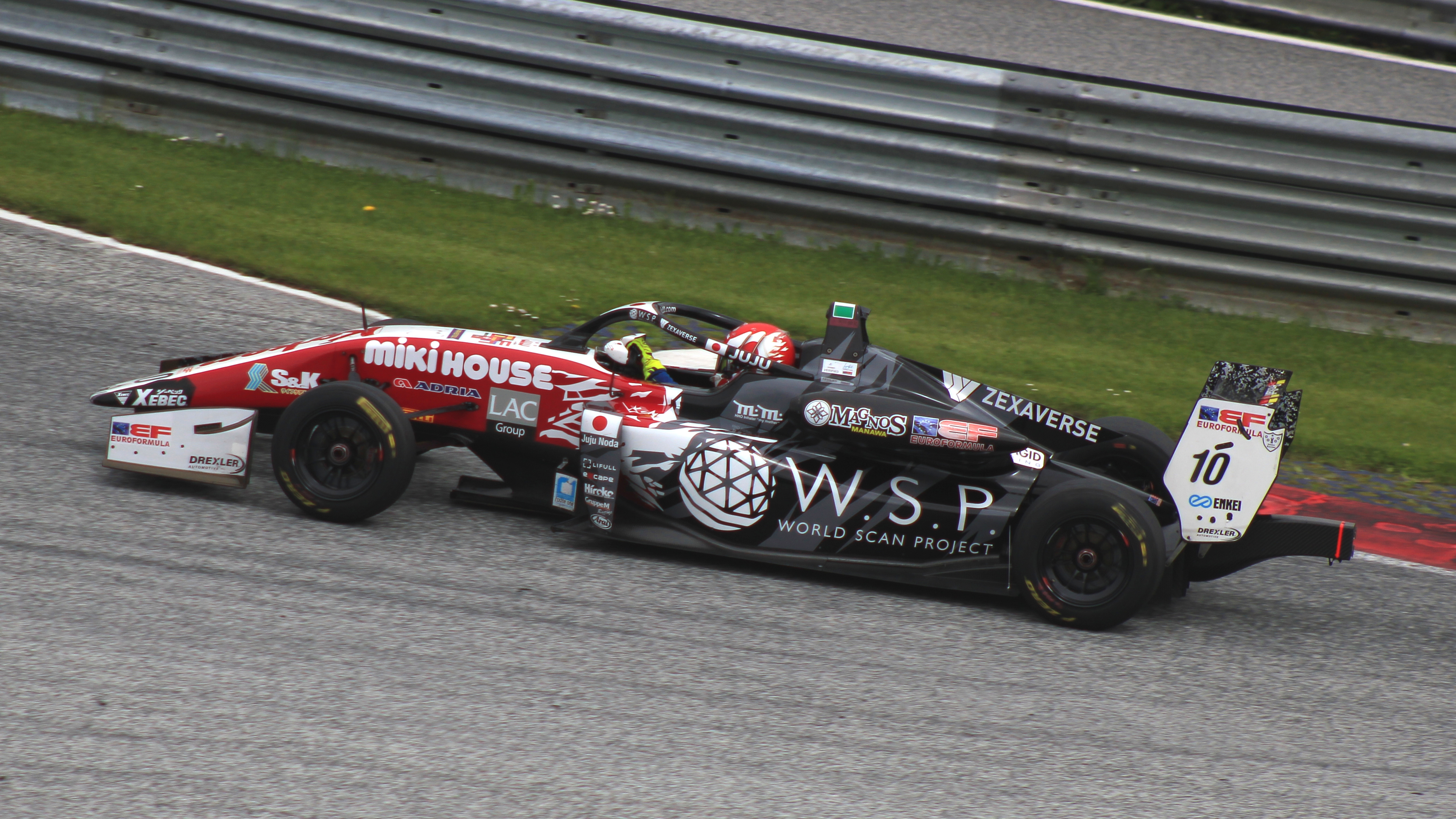
Noda driving at the Red Bull Ring in 2023

Noda would compete in the Euroformula Open Championship for the eponymous Noda Racing team in 2023. A controversial technical regulation stated that female drivers in the championship could run at a minimum weight 26 kg lower than male counterparts. This regulation was abolished before the fifth round of the season at the Red Bull Ring, mandating that Noda's car be run with the same minimum weight as those of her male competitors. In response to this, Hideki Noda announced that they had retired Juju and the Noda Racing entry from the series. Despite only competing at four of the eight rounds, Noda finished eighth in the championship, with 118 points and one win at Circuit Paul Ricard.

=== Super Formula ===
==== 2024 season ====
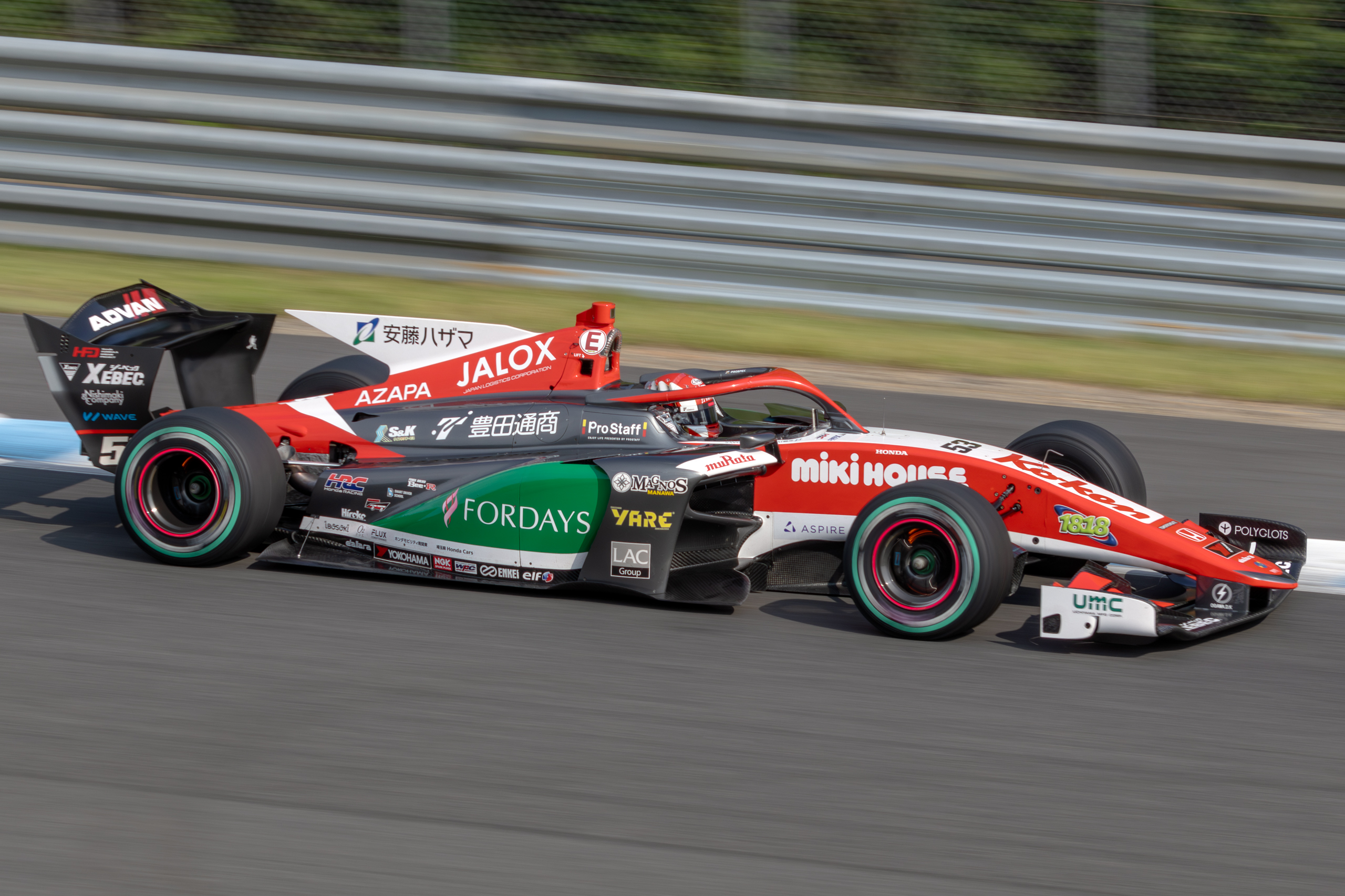
Noda driving at the 2024 Super Formula Motegi round

Noda stepped up to Super Formula in 2024, partnering Nobuharu Matsushita at TGM Grand Prix. Noda became the first Japanese woman to race in Super Formula, Formula Nippon or any of its predecessors. Despite a best finish of twelfth in the attritional penultimate race at Suzuka, Noda struggled with a lack of professional-level motorsport experience – never qualifying higher than 19th in a 21-car field, and lapping on average 1.7 seconds slower than the leaders across the season.

==== 2025 season ====
For 2025, Noda moved to Triple Tree Racing, a new team set up by her father Hideki.

=== Formula E ===
In October 2025, Noda sampled Formula E machinery for the first time during the women's test ahead of the 2025–26 season with Jaguar Racing held at the Circuit Ricardo Tormo. She finished the morning and afternoon sessions in tenth and ninth, respectively. She is set to return with Jaguar during the rookie test at the 2026 Madrid ePrix.

== Racing record ==
=== Racing career summary ===
Season	Series	Team	Races	Wins	Poles	F/Laps	Podiums	Points	Position
2019	Lucas Oil Winter Race Series		3	0	0	0	0	68	14th
2020	F4 Danish Championship	Noda Racing	9	1	3	2	3	85	6th
2021	F4 Danish Championship	Noda Racing	16	0	0	2	5	149	7th
2021	YACademy Winter Series	Jay Howard Driver Development	6	0	0	0	0	12	12th
2021	F4 United States Championship	Jay Howard Driver Development	0	0	0	0	0	0	NC
2022	W Series	W Series Academy	7	0	0	0	0	2	14th
2022	Drexler-Automotive Formula 3 Cup - F3 Open	Vadum Racing	6	0	0	0	0	48	8th
2022	F2000 Italian Formula Trophy	Vadum Racing	6	0	0	0	0	0	NC†
2023	Drexler-Automotive Formula 3 Cup	Noda Racing	14	7	8	8	11	262	**2nd**
2023	F2000 Italian Formula Trophy	Noda Racing	14	7	8	9	11	275	**1st**
2023	Euroformula Open Championship	Noda Racing	12	1	0	1	3	118	8th
2023	BOSS GP - Formula Class	HS Engineering	2	0	0	0	2	44	16th
2024	BOSS GP - Formula Class	MM International Motorsport							
2024	Super Formula	TGM Grand Prix	9	0	0	0	0	0	21st
2025	Super Formula	Hazama Ando Triple Tree Racing	12	0	0	0	0	0	23rd
2026	Super Formula	Hazama Ando Triple Tree Racing	10	0	0	0	0	0	23rd*

^{†} As Noda was a guest driver, she was ineligible to score points.
^{*} Season still in progress.

=== Complete F4 Danish Championship results ===
(key) (Races in bold indicate pole position) (Races in italics indicate fastest lap)

Year	Team	1	2	3	4	5	6	7	8	9	10	11	12	13	14	15	16	17	18	DC	Points
2020	Noda Racing	**JYL**; **1**; 1	JYL; 2 DSQ	JYL; 3; 4	**PAD**; **1**; 3	PAD; 2; 2	PAD; 3; 6	**DJU**; **1**; 10	DJU; 2; 7	DJU; 3; 11†										6th	85
2021	Noda Racing	PAD1; 1; 2	PAD1; 2; 2	PAD1; 3; 8†	PAD2; 1 DSQ	PAD2; 2; 6	PAD2; 3; 11	JYL1; 1 DNS	JYL1; 2 DNS	JYL1; 3; 4	PAD3; 1; 2	PAD3; 2; 3	PAD3; 3 Ret	DJU; 1; 2	DJU; 2; 4	DJU; 3 Ret	JYL2; 1; 5	JYL2; 2; 8	JYL2; 3; 4	7th	149

=== Complete W Series results ===
(key) (Races in bold indicate pole position) (Races in italics indicate fastest lap)

Year	Team	1	2	3	4	5	6	7	DC	Points
2022	W Series Academy	MIA1; 12	MIA2; 15	CAT; 13	SIL; 16	LEC; 13	HUN; 9	SIN; Ret	14th	2

=== Complete F2000 Italian Formula Trophy results ===
(key) (Races in bold indicate pole position) (Races in italics indicate fastest lap)

Year	Team	1	2	3	4	5	6	7	8	9	10	11	12	13	14	DC	Points
2023	Noda Racing	MUG1; 1; 4	MUG1; 2; 1	IMO; 1; 3	IMO; 2; 4	RBR; 1; 2	RBR; 2 Ret	**VLL**; **1**; 3	**VLL**; **2**; 1	**SPA**; **1**; 1	**SPA**; **2**; 1	**MUG2**; **1**; 3	**MUG2**; **2**; 1	**MIS**; **1**; 1	**MIS**; **2**; 2	1st	275

=== Complete Drexler-Automotive Formula Cup results ===
(key) (Races in bold indicate pole position) (Races in italics indicate fastest lap)

Year	Team	1	2	3	4	5	6	7	8	9	10	11	12	13	14	15	16	DC	Points
2023	Noda Racing	**MUG1**; **1**; 3	**MUG1**; **2**; 1	IMO; 1; 3	IMO; 2; 4	HUN; 1	HUN; 2	RBR; 1; 2	RBR; 2 Ret	**SPA**; **1**; 1	**SPA**; **2**; 1	**HOC**; **1**; 4	**HOC**; **2**; 1	**BRN**; **1**; 1	BRN; 2; **1**	MUG2; 1; 3	MUG2; 2; 1	2nd	262

=== Complete Euroformula Open Championship results ===
(key) (Races in bold indicate pole position) (Races in italics indicate fastest lap)

Year	Team	1	2	3	4	5	6	7	8	9	10	11	12	13	14	15	16	17	18	19	20	21	22	23	DC	Points
2023	Noda Racing	PRT; 1; 7	PRT; 2; 7	PRT; 3; 7	SPA; 1; 6	SPA; 2; 7	SPA; 3; 6	HUN; 1; 5	HUN; 2; 3	HUN; 3; 9	LEC; 1; 1	LEC; 2; 4	LEC; 3; 3	RBR; 1 WD	RBR; 2 WD	RBR; 3 WD	MNZ; 1	MNZ; 2	MNZ; 3	MUG; 1	MUG; 2	CAT; 1	CAT; 2	CAT; 3	8th	118

=== Complete BOSS GP Series results ===
(key) (Races in bold indicate pole position; races in italics indicate points for the fastest lap of top ten finishers)

Year	Entrant	Car	Class	1	2	3	4	5	6	7	8	9	10	11	12	13	14	DC	Points
2023	HS Engineering	Dallara T12	Formula	HOC; 1	HOC; 2	LEC; 1	LEC; 2	RBR; 1	RBR; 2	MIS; 1	MIS; 2	ASS; 1	ASS; 2	MNZ; 1; 4	MNZ; 2; 4	MUG; 1	MUG; 2	16th	44

=== Complete Super Formula results ===
Year	Entrant	1	2	3	4	5	6	7	8	9	10	11	12	DC	Points
2024	TGM Grand Prix	SUZ; 17	AUT; 20	SUG; 18	FUJ; 19	MOT; 18	FUJ; 17	FUJ; 16	SUZ; 12	SUZ; 20				21st	0
2025	Hazama Ando Triple Tree Racing	SUZ; 16	SUZ; 21	MOT; 19	MOT; 17	AUT; 19	FUJ; 20	FUJ; NC	SUG; 20	FUJ; 20	SUZ; 17	SUZ; 22	SUZ; 20	23rd	0
2026	Hazama Ando Triple Tree Racing	MOT; Ret	MOT; 22	SUZ; 14	SUZ; 21	FUJ; 22	FUJ; Ret	FUJ; NC	SUG; 17	FUJ; 22	FUJ; 13	SUZ	SUZ	23rd*	0*

^{*} Season still in progress.
