= 2022 W Series =

Motor racing championship

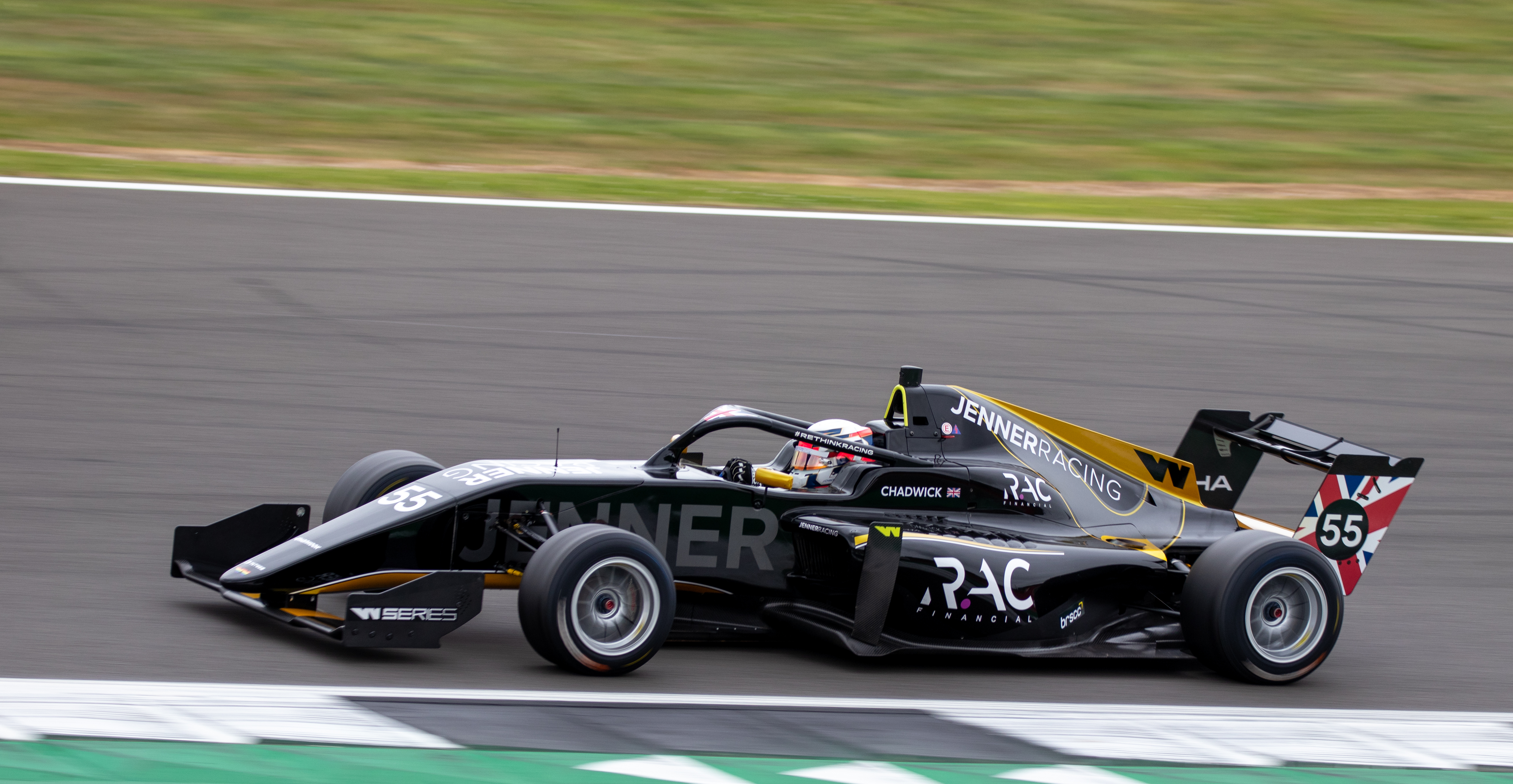
Jamie Chadwick claimed her third consecutive Drivers' Championship.

The 2022 W Series was the third and final season of the W Series motor racing championship. The championship was exclusively open to female racing drivers as a Formula Regional-level racing series in support of the 2022 Formula One World Championship.

Jamie Chadwick became a three time champion following the cancellation of the remainder of the season on 10 October 2022.

== Entries ==
The following drivers and teams competed in the 2022 W Series season. All teams used Hankook tyres, and ran two mechanically-identical Tatuus F3 T-318-Alfa Romeo cars with two drivers. The rounds at Barcelona and Singapore used Tatuus FT-60-Toyota cars loaned by Toyota Racing Series organiser Toyota Gazoo Racing New Zealand.

All cars were operated by Fine Moments, and 'teams' were purely for sponsorship and identification purposes.

Team	No.	Drivers	Rounds
Sirin Racing	4	(Netherlands) Emely de Heus	All
Sirin Racing	95	(Netherlands) Beitske Visser	All
CortDAO W Series Team	5	(Switzerland) Fabienne Wohlwend (Note: Wohlwend is a Liechtenstein driver racing under a Swiss licence.)	All
CortDAO W Series Team	19	(Spain) Marta García	All
Puma W Series Team	7	(Finland) Emma Kimiläinen	All
Puma W Series Team	17	(Norway) Ayla Ågren	7
Puma W Series Team	63	(Czech Republic) Tereza Bábíčková	1–6
Jenner Racing	8	(United States) Chloe Chambers	All
Jenner Racing	55	(United Kingdom) Jamie Chadwick	All
W Series Academy	9	(Philippines) Bianca Bustamante	All
W Series Academy	10	(Denmark) Juju Noda (Note: Noda is a Japanese driver racing under a Danish licence.)	All
Click2Drive Bristol Street Motors Racing	21	(United Kingdom) Jessica Hawkins	All
Click2Drive Bristol Street Motors Racing	27	(United Kingdom) Alice Powell	All
Quantfury W Series Team	22	(Spain) Belén García	All
Quantfury W Series Team	32	(Spain) Nerea Martí	All
Scuderia W	26	(United Kingdom) Sarah Moore	All
Scuderia W	44	(United Kingdom) Abbie Eaton	All
Racing X	49	(United Kingdom) Abbi Pulling	All
Racing X	97	(Brazil) Bruna Tomaselli	All

Reserve drivers
No.	Drivers
17	(Norway) Ayla Ågren

=== Driver selection ===
The top eight finishers from the 2021 championship, as well as the two W Series Academy drivers Nerea Martí and Irina Sidorkova, were guaranteed a place in the 2022 season. Sidorkova was later confirmed to not be competing as a result of the restrictions on the participation of Russian drivers following the 2022 Russian invasion of Ukraine.

From 31 January to 4 February, a five-day test with a Crawford F4-16 car for 15 prospective drivers was conducted at Inde Motorsports Ranch in Arizona, United States. The following drivers took part:

- (United States) Madison Aust
- (Brazil) Júlia Ayoub
- (Czech Republic) Tereza Bábíčková
- (United States) Lindsay Brewer
- (Switzerland) Léna Bühler
- (Philippines) Bianca Bustamante
- (Uruguay) Maite Cáceres
- (United States) Chloe Chambers
- (Netherlands) Emely de Heus
- (Austria) Jorden Dolischka
- (United States) Hannah Greenemeier
- (Canada) Nicole Havrda
- (United Kingdom) Jem Hepworth
- (Austria) Corinna Kamper
- (France) Lola Lovinfosse

A second pre-season test took place at Barcelona on 2–4 March, with the nine automatic qualifiers from 2021 joined by 12 potential drivers — of which five had previous W Series experience and six were present at the Arizona test; Juju Noda, the only driver to receive a free pass:

- (Czech Republic) Tereza Bábíčková
- (Switzerland) Léna Bühler
- (Philippines) Bianca Bustamante
- (United States) Chloe Chambers
- (Netherlands) Emely de Heus
- (Spain) Belén García
- (Spain) Marta García
- (Canada) Megan Gilkes
- (United Kingdom) Jessica Hawkins
- (United Kingdom) Jem Hepworth
- (Japan) Juju Noda
- (Brazil) Bruna Tomaselli

The full driver line-up was revealed on 22 March 2022. On 22 April 2022, Abbie Eaton was confirmed as the final driver, with Ayla Ågren announced as reserve driver.

==== Mid-season changes ====
Tereza Bábíčková did not take part in the Singapore round due to a spinal injury sustained in an incident in a Formula Regional European Championship event at the Red Bull Ring in early September. She was replaced with reserve driver Ayla Ågren.

=== Championship changes ===
Though there were initial plans to introduce FIA-registered standings for formal teams for the season, the championship remained fully centrally-run for a third consecutive year, with 'teams' continuing to be purely for sponsorship and identification purposes. The first of these teams to be announced was Jenner Racing, owned by media personality, Olympic champion and former racing driver Caitlyn Jenner. Three further entries joined the championship: Click2Drive Bristol Street Motors Racing and the cryptocurrency-backed Quantfury and CortDAO teams.

== Calendar and results ==
The provisional calendar was announced on 27 January 2022. W Series continued its partnership with Formula One, so all ten events were part of Grand Prix weekends. An updated calendar was announced on 30 March 2022, with the first and last rounds at Miami and Mexico City confirmed to be double-headers. On 27 July 2022, it was announced that the Marina Bay Street Circuit would replace the Suzuka Circuit due to operational challenges. On 10 October 2022 it was announced the final rounds in United States and Mexico had been cancelled for monetary reasons. This crowned points leader Jamie Chadwick series champion for a third time, as the number of races held exceeded the minimum of six required under the series' rules for a championship to be decided.

Round	Circuit	Date	Pole position	Fastest lap	Race winner	Winning team	Report
1	(United States) Miami International Autodrome	7 May	(Spain) Nerea Martí	(Finland) Emma Kimiläinen	(United Kingdom) Jamie Chadwick	Jenner Racing	Report
2	(United States) Miami International Autodrome	8 May	(United Kingdom) Jamie Chadwick	(United Kingdom) Abbi Pulling	(United Kingdom) Jamie Chadwick	Jenner Racing	Report
3	(Spain) Circuit de Barcelona-Catalunya	21 May	(United Kingdom) Jamie Chadwick	(United Kingdom) Jamie Chadwick	(United Kingdom) Jamie Chadwick	Jenner Racing	Report
4	(United Kingdom) Silverstone Circuit	2 July	(United Kingdom) Jamie Chadwick	(United Kingdom) Abbi Pulling	(United Kingdom) Jamie Chadwick	Jenner Racing	Report
5	(France) Circuit Paul Ricard	23 July	(Netherlands) Beitske Visser (Note: Jamie Chadwick set the fastest time in qualifying, but received a two-place grid penalty for crossing the white line at pit exit. Beitske Visser was promoted to pole position in her place.)	(United Kingdom) Jamie Chadwick	(United Kingdom) Jamie Chadwick	Jenner Racing	Report
6	(Hungary) Hungaroring	30 July	(United Kingdom) Alice Powell	(United Kingdom) Jamie Chadwick	(United Kingdom) Alice Powell	Click2Drive Bristol Street Motors Racing	Report
7	(Singapore) Marina Bay Street Circuit	2 October	(Spain) Marta García	(United Kingdom) Alice Powell	(Netherlands) Beitske Visser	Sirin Racing	Report
Rounds cancelled due to financial reasons
–	(United States) Circuit of the Americas	22 October	Rounds not replaced				
–	(Mexico) Autódromo Hermanos Rodríguez	29 October	Rounds not replaced				
–	(Mexico) Autódromo Hermanos Rodríguez	30 October	Rounds not replaced				

== Season summary ==
The third season of the championship started with its debut event around the Miami International Autodrome. Nerea Martí scored her maiden pole position, but stalled at the start. This allowed Jamie Chadwick and Emma Kimiläinen through, wo started battling for the lead until Alice Powell hit the wall, causing a lengthy safety car and eventually a stoppage. Chadwick led the restart and remained ahead of Kimiläinen. The top pair gapped the field while battling, before a late-race safety car was called for a collision between Fabienne Wohlwend and Abbie Eaton. In a single lap shootout to the chequered flag, Marta García attempted a move on Kimiläinen for second but made contact with the Finn and spun her. Chadwick won the race ahead of García, but a time penalty for the CortDAO driver promoted Jessica Hawkins to second and Beitske Visser to third.

Chadwick had pole for the second Miami race, and kept her lead ahead of Martí and Kimiläinen. The latter pair battled for the first part of the race, with Martí eventually coming out in front. By then however, Chadwick had a comfortable gap on them, which she kept until the end. Behind the pair, Kimiläinen struggled to keep Powell and Belén García behind. On the penultimate lap Kimiläinen half-spun and Powell collided with her; the Brit sustaining front wing damage but held on to finish third. A penalty demoted Martí behind Powell for an illegal defensive move.

The Circuit de Barcelona-Catalunya played host to the third round of the season, with Chadwick taking pole. Behind her, Abbi Pulling disposed of her mentor Powell at the start to move into second place and began closing up to the leader. The gaps between the top trio remained steady all through the race, and Chadwick was able to manage her tyres the best of the three. No one could muster a serious attack on her lead, even though Pulling came close to it at various points during the race and was within half a second of Chadwick on the last lap. A third win cemented Chadwick's championship advantage, now at 37 points, and Pulling's second place moved her up to second in the standings. Chloe Chambers spun into the gravel on the last lap.

Chadwick continued where she left off at Silverstone, taking her third pole position in a row. Powell, who qualified third, stalled on the formation lap and failed to re-take her grid position fast enough on the formation lap, netting her a stop-go penalty. This promoted Kimiläinen to second, four seconds behind Chadwick at that point. Pulling rose up from fifth to third and collided with Kimiläinen when trying to overtake her on the penultimate lap. The pair just managed to stay second and third ahead of Wohlwend, having both sustained damage. As a result of the incident, Chadwick won the race by almost twenty seconds, bolstering her championship lead to 47 points.

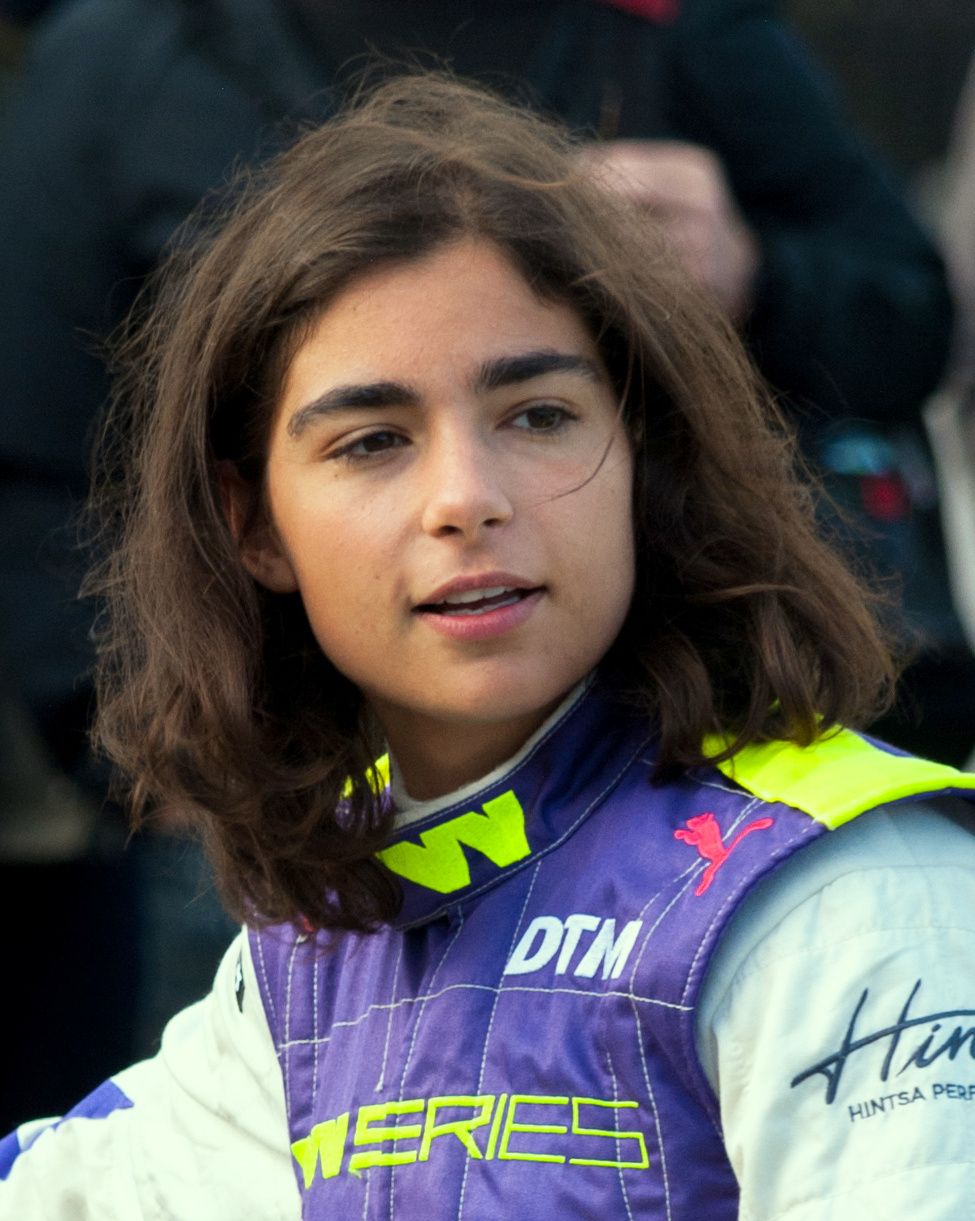
Jamie Chadwick (pictured in 2019) won her third championship.

The next round at Paul Ricard initially saw Chadwick on pole again, before a grid penalty promoted Visser to first. A safety car was called after a tumultuous start in the mid-pack saw Eaton's car launched up in the air and ending her race, but not before Chadwick rounded up both Visser and second-placed Martí within the first three corners. Chadwick's lead was only threatened once during the race when Visser briefly re-passed her on the safety car restart, but Chadwick assumed authority not long after with Visser dropping back to fourth behind Belén García and Martí. Another safety car was later called for a collision between Chambers and Emely de Heus. In the last half of the race, the CortDAO team-mates fought a titanic battle over seventh which was ultimately resolved in favour of Marta García. Chadwick won again and her championship lead now stood at 70 points.

When the series visited the Hungaroring, Chadwick could only manage fifth in qualifying as Powell took pole. The race began in damp conditions and Martí was caught out, dropping back from third and allowing Chadwick through before making contact with team-mate Belén García. Chadwick then moved up into third by passing Marta García. Further behind, Kimiläinen tagged Hawkins into a spin – the Puma driver later retiring from the race due to the damage incurred. Chadwick continued to improve her position, passing Visser for second shortly before the safety car was called for Bianca Bustamante – who had spun, damaged her car and stopped in the pit lane entry. After a four-minute dash to the end, Powell held on to end Chadwick's win streak and move into second in the standings; Chadwick maintaining a 75-point lead.

Originally planned to be held at Suzuka, the next round was moved to the Marina Bay Street Circuit in Singapore. Ahead of the event, Tereza Bábíčková broke her back in a Formula Regional European Championship race and was replaced with Ayla Ågren. Marta García took pole in a qualifying session disrupted by torrential tropical storms, but Chadwick could only manage eighth on the grid. Visser took the lead at the start from Marta García, who struggled to hold on to the Dutchwoman's pace. García was soon overtaken by Powell, who then set after Visser. Chadwick meanwhile was stuck behind Hawkins having made her way to sixth, and after multiple laps she attempted an overtake but outbraked herself and crashed at turn seven. One lap remained after the safety car, with Visser holding on to win her first race since Zolder 2019.

Doubts arose over the financial health of the championship in the days leading up to the Singapore event. The series organisers set a deadline to determine whether to hold the last three races for the week after the Singapore round. The final races of the season were ultimately cancelled for monetary reasons on 10 October 2022. The series CEO, Catherine Bond Muir, stated that there was "great optimism" when looking at being able to hold the 2023 season and the longer-term future of the series, but the Singapore event ultimately proved to be the series' last. Jamie Chadwick was crowned champion, defending her title once again and remaining the only W Series champion to date.

== Championship standings ==
=== Scoring system ===
Points were awarded to the top ten classified finishers as follows:

Race Position	**1st**	**2nd**	**3rd**	**4th**	**5th**	**6th**	**7th**	**8th**	**9th**	**10th**
Points	25	18	15	12	10	8	6	4	2	1

=== Drivers' Championship ===
Pos.	Driver	MIA1 (United States)	MIA2 (United States)	CAT (Spain)	SIL (United Kingdom)	LEC (France)	HUN (Hungary)	SIN (Singapore)	Points
1	(United Kingdom) Jamie Chadwick	1	**1**	**1**	**1**	1	2	Ret	143
2	(Netherlands) Beitske Visser	3	7	5	5	**4**	3	1	93
3	(United Kingdom) Alice Powell	Ret	2	3	14	5	**1**	2	86
4	(United Kingdom) Abbi Pulling	4	6	2	3	9	5	6	73
5	(Spain) Belén García	7	4	7	8	2	13	4	58
6	(Spain) Marta García	11	9	6	18	6	4	**3**	45
7	(Spain) Nerea Martí	**6**	3	8	9	3	12	12	44
8	(Finland) Emma Kimiläinen	15	5	4	2	12	Ret	9	42
9	(United Kingdom) Jessica Hawkins	2	Ret	11	6	10	14	5	37
10	(Switzerland) Fabienne Wohlwend	Ret	11	9	4	7	6	8	32
11	(United Kingdom) Sarah Moore	8	8	10	10	8	7	7	26
12	(Brazil) Bruna Tomaselli	5	17	12	11	11	10	14	11
13	(United Kingdom) Abbie Eaton	Ret	13	16	7	Ret	8	10	11
14	(Denmark) Juju Noda	12	15	13	16	13	9	Ret	2
15	(Philippines) Bianca Bustamante	9	14	15	17	15	Ret	15	2
16	(United States) Chloe Chambers	14	10	Ret	13	Ret	11	11	1
17	(Netherlands) Emely de Heus	10	12	14	15	16	16	13	1
18	(Czech Republic) Tereza Bábíčková	13	16	17	12	14	15		0
19	(Norway) Ayla Ågren							16	0
Pos.	Driver	MIA1 (United States)	MIA2 (United States)	CAT (Spain)	SIL (United Kingdom)	LEC (France)	HUN (Hungary)	SIN (Singapore)	Points

Colour	Result
Gold	Winner
Silver	Second place
Bronze	Third place
Green	Points classification
Blue	Non-points classification
Blue	Non-classified finish (NC)
Purple	Retired, not classified (Ret)
Red	Did not qualify (DNQ)
Red	Did not pre-qualify (DNPQ)
Black	Disqualified (DSQ)
White	Did not start (DNS)
White	Withdrew (WD)
White	Race cancelled (C)
Blank	Did not practice (DNP)
Blank	Did not arrive (DNA)
Blank	Excluded (EX)

**Bold** – Pole

Italics – Fastest Lap

† — Did not finish, but classified
