= 2022 W Series Budapest round =

- Event 5 of 6 of the 2022 W Series

Race details
- Date: 30 July 2022
- Official name: 2022 W Series Budapest round
- Location: Hungaroring, Mogyoród, Pest County, Hungary
- Course: Permanent circuit
- Course length: 4.381 km (2.722 miles)
- Distance: 17 laps, 74.477 km (46.274 miles)
- Weather: Overcast and damp, 24°C

Pole position
Driver	(United Kingdom) Alice Powell	Bristol Street Motors Racing
- Time: 1:42.986

Fastest lap
Driver	(United Kingdom) Jamie Chadwick	Jenner Racing
- Time: 1:44.531

Podium
First	(United Kingdom) Alice Powell	Bristol Street Motors Racing
Second	(United Kingdom) Jamie Chadwick	Jenner Racing
Third	(Netherlands) Beitske Visser	Sirin Racing

The 2022 W Series Budapest round was the fifth and penultimate round of a planned eight in the 2022 W Series, and took place at the Hungaroring in Hungary on the 30th of July 2022. The event was an undercard to the 2022 Formula One World Championship round at the same circuit.

== Classification ==
=== Practice ===
Session	No.	Driver	Commercial entrant	Time	Source
Practice 1	95	(Netherlands) Beitske Visser	Sirin Racing	1:43.631	

=== Qualifying ===
Pos.	No.	Driver	Commercial entrant	Time/Gap
1	27	(United Kingdom) Alice Powell	Bristol Street Motors Racing	1:42.986
2	95	(Netherlands) Beitske Visser	Sirin Racing	+0.205
3	32	(Spain) Nerea Martí	Quantfury W Series Team	+0.323
4	19	(Spain) Marta García	CortDAO W Series Team	+0.342
5	55	(United Kingdom) Jamie Chadwick	Jenner Racing	+0.487
6	49	(United Kingdom) Abbi Pulling	Racing X	+0.503
7	22	(Spain) Belén García	Quantfury W Series Team	+0.669
8	7	(Finland) Emma Kimiläinen	Puma W Series Team	+0.763
9	5	(Liechtenstein) Fabienne Wohlwend	CortDAO W Series Team	+0.817
10	21	(United Kingdom) Jessica Hawkins	Bristol Street Motors Racing	+0.826
11	26	(United Kingdom) Sarah Moore	Scuderia W	+0.961
12	63	(Czech Republic) Tereza Bábíčková	Puma W Series Team	+1.000
13	44	(United Kingdom) Abbie Eaton	Scuderia W	+1.372
14	8	(United States) Chloe Chambers	Jenner Racing	+1.515
15	97	(Brazil) Bruna Tomaselli	Racing X	+1.572
16	10	(Japan) Juju Noda	W Series Academy	+1.865
17	4	(Netherlands) Emely de Heus	Sirin Racing	+2.141
18	9	(Philippines) Bianca Bustamante	W Series Academy	+2.829

=== Race ===
Pos.	No.	Driver	Commercial entrant	Laps	Time/Retired	Grid	Pts
1	27	(United Kingdom) Alice Powell	Bristol Street Motors Racing	17	32:42.101	1	25
2	55	(United Kingdom) Jamie Chadwick	Jenner Racing	17	+0.608	5	18
3	95	(Netherlands) Beitske Visser	Sirin Racing	17	+3.429	2	15
4	19	(Spain) Marta García	CortDAO W Series Team	17	+5.802	4	12
5	49	(United Kingdom) Abbi Pulling	Racing X	17	+6.047	6	10
6	5	(Liechtenstein) Fabienne Wohlwend	CortDAO W Series Team	17	+6.385	9	8
7	26	(United Kingdom) Sarah Moore	Scuderia W	17	+8.251	11	6
8	44	(United Kingdom) Abbie Eaton	Scuderia W	17	+11.501	13	4
9	10	(Japan) Juju Noda	W Series Academy	17	+11.904	16	2
10	97	(Brazil) Bruna Tomaselli	Racing X	17	+12.347	15	1
11	8	(United States) Chloe Chambers	Jenner Racing	17	+13.044	14	
12	32	(Spain) Nerea Martí	Quantfury W Series Team	17	+14.073	3	
13	22	(Spain) Belén García	Quantfury W Series Team	17	+14.492	7	
14	21	(United Kingdom) Jessica Hawkins	Bristol Street Motors Racing	17	+14.838	10	
15	63	(Czech Republic) Tereza Bábíčková	Puma W Series Team	17	+16.549	12	
16	4	(Netherlands) Emely de Heus	Sirin Racing	17	+18.986	17	
DNF	7	(Finland) Emma Kimiläinen	Puma W Series Team	8	Crash damage	8	
DNF	9	(Philippines) Bianca Bustamante	W Series Academy	7	Crash damage	18	
Fastest lap set by Jamie Chadwick: 1:44.531

== Championship standings ==
Pos.	Driver	Pts	Gap
1	(United Kingdom) Jamie Chadwick	143	
2	(United Kingdom) Alice Powell	68	-75
2	(Netherlands) Beitske Visser	68	-75
4	(United Kingdom) Abbi Pulling	65	-78
5	(Spain) Belén García	46	-97

== See also ==
- 2022 Hungarian Grand Prix
- 2022 Formula 2 Budapest round
- 2022 Formula 3 Budapest round

Previous race: 2022 W Series Le Castellet round	W Series; 2022 season	Next race: 2022 W Series Singapore round
