= 2022 Miami W Series round =

(United States) 2022 W Series Miami round
Event Information
- Round 1 of 7 in the 2022 W Series
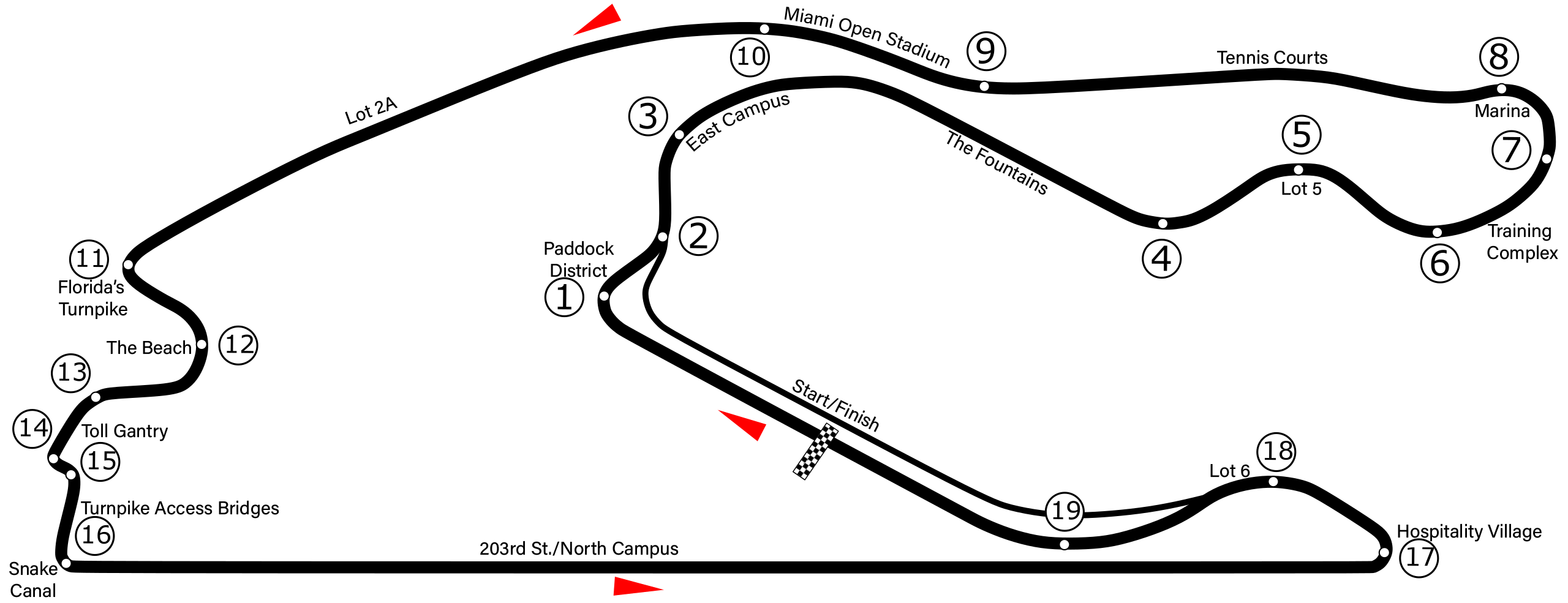
- Date: 6–8 May 2022 W Series
- Location: Miami Gardens, Florida, United States
- Venue: Miami International Autodrome

Results
Race 1
| Distance | 13 laps | 70.330 km |
| Pole position | (Spain) Nerea Martí; Quantfury W Series Team | 1:56.915 |
| Winner | (United Kingdom) Jamie Chadwick; Jenner Racing | 43:06.650 |
Race 2
| Distance | 17 laps | 91.970 km |
| Pole position | (United Kingdom) Jamie Chadwick; Jenner Racing | 1:57.080 |
| Winner | (United Kingdom) Jamie Chadwick; Jenner Racing | 33:19.605 |

The 2022 W Series Miami round (known for commercial reasons as W Series Miami presented by Hard Rock) was the first of seven rounds in the 2022 W Series, and took place at the Miami International Autodrome in the United States on the 7th and 8 May 2022. The event served as an undercard to the 2022 Formula One World Championship round at the same circuit.

== Classification ==
=== Practice ===
| Session | No. | Driver | Team | Time | Source |
|---|---|---|---|---|---|
| Practice 1 | 27 | (United Kingdom) Alice Powell | Bristol Street Motors Racing | 1:57.118 | |

=== Qualifying ===
| Pos. | No. | Driver | Team | Time/Gap |
Fastest times (Race 1)
| 1 | 32 | (Spain) Nerea Martí | Quantfury W Series Team | 1:56.915 |
| 2 | 55 | (United Kingdom) Jamie Chadwick | Jenner Racing | +0.075 |
| 3 | 27 | (United Kingdom) Alice Powell | Bristol Street Motors Racing | +0.522 |
| 4 | 7 | (Finland) Emma Kimiläinen | Puma W Series Team | +0.564 |
| 5 | 5 | (Liechtenstein) Fabienne Wohlwend (Note: Wohlwend races with a Swiss licence however is a Liechtenstein citizen and passport holder.) | CortDAO W Series Team | +0.708 |
| 6 | 21 | (United Kingdom) Jessica Hawkins | Bristol Street Motors Racing | +0.943 |
| 7 | 22 | (Spain) Belén García | Quantfury W Series Team | +1.117 |
| 8 | 26 | (United Kingdom) Sarah Moore | Scuderia W | +1.133 |
| 9 | 49 | (United Kingdom) Abbi Pulling | Racing X | +1.163 |
| 10 | 19 | (Spain) Marta García | CortDAO W Series Team | +1.178 |
| 11 | 8 | (United States) Chloe Chambers | Jenner Racing | +1.395 |
| 12 | 95 | (Netherlands) Beitske Visser | Sirin Racing | +1.483 |
| 13 | 44 | (United Kingdom) Abbie Eaton | Scuderia W | +1.522 |
| 14 | 97 | (Brazil) Bruna Tomaselli | Racing X | +1.739 |
| 15 | 4 | (Netherlands) Emely de Heus | Sirin Racing | +2.167 |
| 16 | 63 | (Czech Republic) Tereza Bábíčková | Puma W Series Team | +3.115 |
| 17 | 9 | (Philippines) Bianca Bustamante | W Series Academy | +3.470 |
| 18 | 10 | (Japan) Juju Noda (Note: Noda races with a Danish licence however is a Japanese citizen and passport holder.) | W Series Academy | +5.764 |
Second fastest times (Race 2)
| 1 | 55 | (United Kingdom) Jamie Chadwick | Jenner Racing | 1:57.080 |
| 2 | 32 | (Spain) Nerea Martí | Quantfury W Series Team | +0.499 |
| 3 | 7 | (Finland) Emma Kimiläinen | Puma W Series Team | +0.688 |
| 4 | 27 | (United Kingdom) Alice Powell | Bristol Street Motors Racing | +0.744 |
| 5 | 5 | (Liechtenstein) Fabienne Wohlwend | CortDAO W Series Team | +0.859 |
| 6 | 22 | (Spain) Belén García | Quantfury W Series Team | +1.106 |
| 7 | 21 | (United Kingdom) Jessica Hawkins | Bristol Street Motors Racing | +1.386 |
| 8 | 95 | (Netherlands) Beitske Visser | Sirin Racing | +1.393 |
| 9 | 49 | (United Kingdom) Abbi Pulling | Racing X | +1.397 |
| 10 | 26 | (United Kingdom) Sarah Moore | Scuderia W | +1.400 |
| 11 | 19 | (Spain) Marta García | CortDAO W Series Team | +1.424 |
| 12 | 44 | (United Kingdom) Abbie Eaton | Scuderia W | +1.562 |
| 13 | 97 | (Brazil) Bruna Tomaselli | Racing X | +1.838 |
| 14 | 8 | (United States) Chloe Chambers | Jenner Racing | +1.965 |
| 15 | 4 | (Netherlands) Emely de Heus | Sirin Racing | +2.344 |
| 16 | 63 | (Czech Republic) Tereza Bábíčková | Puma W Series Team | +3.486 |
| 17 | 9 | (Philippines) Bianca Bustamante | W Series Academy | +4.030 |
| 18 | 10 | (Japan) Juju Noda | W Series Academy | +8.877 |

=== Race 1 ===
| Pos. | No. | Driver | Team | Laps | Time/Retired | Grid | Pts |
|---|---|---|---|---|---|---|---|
| 1 | 55 | (United Kingdom) Jamie Chadwick | Jenner Racing | 13 | 43:06.650 | 2 | 25 |
| 2 | 21 | (United Kingdom) Jessica Hawkins | Bristol Street Motors Racing | 13 | +3.294 | 6 | 18 |
| 3 | 95 | (Netherlands) Beitske Visser | Sirin Racing | 13 | +3.385 | 12 | 15 |
| 4 | 49 | (United Kingdom) Abbi Pulling | Racing X | 13 | +4.404 | 9 | 12 |
| 5 | 97 | (Brazil) Bruna Tomaselli | Racing X | 13 | +6.264 | 14 | 10 |
| 6 | 32 | (Spain) Nerea Martí | Quantfury W Series Team | 13 | +7.201 | 1 | 8 |
| 7 | 22 | (Spain) Belén García | Quantfury W Series Team | 13 | +7.572 | 7 | 6 |
| 8 | 26 | (United Kingdom) Sarah Moore | Scuderia W | 13 | +7.722 | 8 | 4 |
| 9 | 9 | (Philippines) Bianca Bustamante | W Series Academy | 13 | +8.254 | 17 | 2 |
| 10 | 4 | (Netherlands) Emely de Heus | Sirin Racing | 13 | +10.511 | 15 | 1 |
| 11 | 19 | (Spain) Marta García | CortDAO W Series Team | 13 | +13.123^{1} | 10 | |
| 12 | 10 | (Japan) Juju Noda | W Series Academy | 13 | +13.662 | 18 | |
| 13 | 63 | (Czech Republic) Tereza Bábíčková | Puma W Series Team | 13 | +15.137 | 16 | |
| 14 | 8 | (United States) Chloe Chambers | Jenner Racing | 13 | +36.709^{2} | 11 | |
| 15 | 7 | (Finland) Emma Kimiläinen | Puma W Series Team | 13 | +53.950 | 4 | |
| DNF | 5 | (Liechtenstein) Fabienne Wohlwend | CortDAO W Series Team | 8 | Collision | 5 | |
| DNF | 44 | (United Kingdom) Abbie Eaton | Scuderia W | 8 | Collision ^{2} | 13 | |
| DNF | 27 | (United Kingdom) Alice Powell | Bristol Street Motors Racing | 0 | Accident | 3 | |
Fastest lap set by Emma Kimiläinen: 1:58.979
Sources:

- ^1 – Marta García received a 10-second time penalty for crashing into Emma Kimiläinen.
- ^2 – Chloe Chambers and Abbie Eaton both received a 30-second time penalty for overtaking before the control line on a Safety Car restart.

=== Race 2 ===
| Pos. | No. | Driver | Team | Laps | Time/Retired | Grid | Pts |
|---|---|---|---|---|---|---|---|
| 1 | 55 | (United Kingdom) Jamie Chadwick | Jenner Racing | 17 | 33:19.605 | 1 | 25 |
| 2 | 27 | (United Kingdom) Alice Powell | Bristol Street Motors Racing | 17 | +8.876 | 4 | 18 |
| 3 | 32 | (Spain) Nerea Martí | Quantfury W Series Team | 17 | +2.997^{1} | 2 | 15 |
| 4 | 22 | (Spain) Belén García | Quantfury W Series Team | 17 | +10.405 | 5 | 12 |
| 5 | 7 | (Finland) Emma Kimiläinen | Puma W Series Team | 17 | +11.093 | 3 | 10 |
| 6 | 49 | (United Kingdom) Abbi Pulling | Racing X | 17 | +12.382 | 8 | 8 |
| 7 | 95 | (Netherlands) Beitske Visser | Sirin Racing | 17 | +12.589 | 7 | 6 |
| 8 | 26 | (United Kingdom) Sarah Moore | Scuderia W | 17 | +13.414 | 9 | 4 |
| 9 | 19 | (Spain) Marta García | CortDAO W Series Team | 17 | +14.073 | 11 | 2 |
| 10 | 8 | (United States) Chloe Chambers | Jenner Racing | 17 | +27.898 | 14 | 1 |
| 11 | 5 | (Liechtenstein) Fabienne Wohlwend | CortDAO W Series Team | 17 | +28.360 | 10^{2} | |
| 12 | 4 | (Netherlands) Emely de Heus | Sirin Racing | 17 | +46.092 | 15 | |
| 13 | 44 | (United Kingdom) Abbie Eaton | Scuderia W | 17 | +50.270 | 12 | |
| 14 | 9 | (Philippines) Bianca Bustamante | W Series Academy | 17 | +51.583 | 17 | |
| 15 | 10 | (Japan) Juju Noda | W Series Academy | 17 | +1:29.150 | 18 | |
| 16 | 63 | (Czech Republic) Tereza Bábíčková | Puma W Series Team | 17 | +1:49.002 | 16 | |
| 17 | 97 | (Brazil) Bruna Tomaselli | Racing X | 16 | +1 lap | 13 | |
| 18^{3} | 21 | (United Kingdom) Jessica Hawkins | Bristol Street Motors Racing | 16 | Stuck in pits^{4} | 6 | |
Fastest lap set by Abbi Pulling: 1:56.406
Sources:

- ^1 – Nerea Martí was relegated to third place for "making more than one change of direction whilst defending Car #27 (Alice Powell) between turns 3 and 4".
- ^2 – Fabienne Wohlwend received a 5-place grid penalty for crashing into Abbie Eaton in the previous race.
- ^3 – Did not finish the race, but was classified having completed 90% of the race distance.
- ^4 – Jessica Hawkins entered the pit-lane on the penultimate lap and was unable to leave before the pit-lane closed at the chequered flag.

== Championship standings ==
Drivers' Championship standings

| Pos. | Driver | Pts | Gap |
|---|---|---|---|
| 1 | (United Kingdom) Jamie Chadwick | 50 | |
| 2 | (Spain) Nerea Martí | 23 | -27 |
| 3 | (Netherlands) Beitske Visser | 21 | -29 |
| 4 | (United Kingdom) Abbi Pulling | 20 | -30 |
| 5 | (United Kingdom) Jessica Hawkins | 18 | -32 |
| 5 | (United Kingdom) Alice Powell | 18 | -32 |
| 5 | (Spain) Belén García | 18 | -32 |

Teams' Championship standings

| Pos. | Team | Pts | Gap |
|---|---|---|---|
| 1 | Jenner Racing | 51 | |
| 2 | Quantfury W Series Team | 41 | -10 |
| 3 | Bristol Street Motors Racing | 36 | -15 |
| 4 | Racing X | 30 | -21 |
| 5 | Sirin Racing | 22 | -29 |

- Note: Only the top five positions are included.

== Notes ==
| Previous race: 2021 W Series Austin round | W Series; 2022 season | Next race: 2022 W Series Barcelona round |
