= 2002 V8Star Series =

Car racing season

Seasons
- ← 2001 2003 →

The 2002 V8Star Series season was the second V8Star Series season. It featured ten races at six European racing circuits, in Germany, Belgium and Austria. Venezuelan ex-Formula One and Grand Prix motorcycle racing driver Johnny Cecotto was crowned champion of the series for a second time, taking three wins in all and beating Austrian Robert Lechner to the title.

== Teams and drivers ==
2002 Entry List
Team	No.	Drivers	Rounds
(Germany) Irmscher Motorsport	1	(Venezuela) Johnny Cecotto	All
(Germany) SST Engineering	3	(Denmark) Kurt Thiim	All
(Germany) SST Engineering	4	(Germany) Steffen Widmann	All
(France) PoleVision Racing	5	(Germany) Ellen Lohr	1–7
(France) PoleVision Racing	5	(South Africa) Toby Scheckter	8
(France) PoleVision Racing	5	(Switzerland) Benjamin Leuenberger	9–10
(France) PoleVision Racing	6	(Germany) Roland Asch	All
(Germany) MRS Workshop	11	(Germany) Ralf Druckenmüller	All
(Germany) Motopark Oschersleben	14	(Germany) Dennis Rostek	All
(Germany) MIS Mönninghoff	16	(Germany) Thomas Mutsch	All
(Germany) Becker Motorsport	18	(Germany) Harald Becker	All
(Germany) 1st Choice Racing	20	(Germany) Patrick Michels	All
(Germany) 1st Choice Racing	21	(Denmark) Kris Nissen	All
(Germany) Ryll Racing	22	(Germany) Siegfried Ryll	All
(Germany) Ryll Racing	23	(Germany) Tom Schwister	1
(Germany) Ryll Racing	23	(Italy) Gianni Giudici	2–4, 6–10
(Germany) Ryll Racing	23	(Germany) Oliver Mayer	5
(Germany) GAG Racing Team	27	(Germany) Hubert Haupt	1–7
(Germany) GAG Racing Team	27	(Germany) Franz Engstler	8, 10
(Germany) GAG Racing Team	27	(Netherlands) Jeroen Bleekemolen	9
(Germany) GAG Racing Team	28	(Germany) Dirk Adorf	All
(Germany) Grohs Motorsport	44	(Germany) Christian Hohenadel	1–5, 8–9
(Germany) Grohs Motorsport	44	(Belgium) Marc Duez	6–7
(Germany) Grohs Motorsport	55	(Germany) Markus Oestreich	All
(Germany) JAG Racing Team	66	(Germany) Sascha Bert	All
(Germany) JAG Racing Team	77	(Germany) Patrick Simon	1–6
(Germany) JAG Racing Team	77	(Germany) Christian Danner	7
(Germany) JAG Racing Team	77	(Germany) Ellen Lohr	8–10
(Germany) Zakspeed Motorsport	88	(Portugal) Pedro Lamy	All
(Germany) Zakspeed Motorsport	99	(Austria) Robert Lechner	All

== Race calendar and results ==
2002 Calendar and Results
Round		Circuit	Country	Date	Pole position	Winning driver	Winning team
1	R	(Germany) Motorsport Arena Oschersleben	Germany	April 27	(Germany) Ralf Druckenmüller	(Venezuela) Johnny Cecotto	(Germany) Irmscher Motorsport
2	R	(Germany) Hockenheimring	Germany	May 11	(Portugal) Pedro Lamy	(Germany) Thomas Mutsch	(Germany) MIS Mönninghoff
3	R	(Germany) Nürburgring	Germany	June 1	(Austria) Robert Lechner	(Portugal) Pedro Lamy	(Germany) Zakspeed Motorsport
4	R	(Germany) EuroSpeedway Lausitz	Germany	June 15	(Portugal) Pedro Lamy	(Germany) Thomas Mutsch	(Germany) MIS Mönninghoff
5	R	(Belgium) Zolder	Belgium	July 6	(Germany) Thomas Mutsch	(Germany) Thomas Mutsch	(Germany) MIS Mönninghoff
6	R	(Germany) Nürburgring	Germany	July 20	(Venezuela) Johnny Cecotto	(Venezuela) Johnny Cecotto	(Germany) Irmscher Motorsport
7	R	(Austria) Salzburgring	Austria	August 10	(Germany) Markus Oestreich	(Germany) Thomas Mutsch	(Germany) MIS Mönninghoff
8	R	(Germany) EuroSpeedway Lausitz	Germany	August 31	(Germany) Thomas Mutsch	(Venezuela) Johnny Cecotto	(Germany) Irmscher Motorsport
9	R	(Germany) Nürburgring	Germany	September 21	(Austria) Robert Lechner	(Austria) Robert Lechner	(Germany) Zakspeed Motorsport
10	R	(Germany) Motorsport Arena Oschersleben	Germany	October 12	(Portugal) Pedro Lamy	(Austria) Robert Lechner	(Germany) Zakspeed Motorsport

== Championship standings ==
2002 Driver Standings
Pos	Driver	Points
1	(Venezuela) Johnny Cecotto	290
2	(Austria) Robert Lechner	259
3	(Germany) Thomas Mutsch	257
4	(Germany) Steffen Widmann	249
5	(Germany) Roland Asch	238
6	(Denmark) Kris Nissen	229
7	(Portugal) Pedro Lamy	202
8	(Germany) Dirk Adorf	201
9	(Denmark) Kurt Thiim	190
10	(Germany) Sascha Bert	180
11	(Germany) Patrick Michels	171
12	(Germany) Ellen Lohr	157
13	(Germany) Ralf Druckenmüller	151
14	(Germany) Markus Oestreich	147
15	(Germany) Siegfried Ryll	141
16	(Germany) Dennis Rostek	141
17	(Germany) Harald Becker	139
18	(Italy) Gianni Giudici	123
19	(Germany) Christian Hohenadel	86
20	(Germany) Hubert Haupt	80
21	(Germany) Patrick Simon	65
22	(Germany) Franz Engstler	47
23	(Belgium) Marc Duez	43
24	(Switzerland) Benjamin Leuenberger	42
25	(Germany) Christian Danner	27
26	(South Africa) Toby Scheckter	23
27	(Netherlands) Jeroen Bleekemolen	21
28	(Germany) Oliver Mayer	14
29	(Germany) Tom Schwister	0
Pos	Driver	Points

2002 Team Standings
Pos	Team	Points
1	(Germany) Zakspeed Motorsport	461
2	(Germany) SST Engineering	439
3	(France) PoleVision Racing	417
4	(Germany) 1st Choice Racing	400
5	(Germany) GAG Racing Team	349
6	(Germany) JAG Racing Team	315
7	(Germany) Irmscher Motorsport	290
8	(Germany) Ryll Racing	278
9	(Germany) Grohs Motorsport	276
10	(Germany) MIS Mönninghoff	257
11	(Germany) MRS Workshop	151
12	(Germany) Motopark Oschersleben	141
13	(Germany) Becker Motorsport	139
Pos	Team	Points

Position	1st	2nd	3rd	4th	5th	6th	7th	8th	9th	10th	11th	12th	13th	14th	15th	16th	17th	18th	19th	20th	21st	22nd	23rd	24th	25th	26th	27th	28th	29th	30th
Points	32	30	29	28	27	26	25	24	23	22	21	20	19	18	17	16	15	14	13	12	11	10	9	8	7	6	5	4	3	2
