= 2001 V8Star Series =

Seasons
- ← none 2002 →

The 2001 V8Star Series season was the inaugural V8Star Series season. It featured nine races at five European racing circuits, in Germany and Austria. Venezuelan ex-Formula One and Grand Prix motorcycle racing driver Johnny Cecotto was crowned champion of the series, taking four wins, and beating Germans Marcel Tiemann and Roland Asch to the title.

== Teams and drivers ==
2001 Entry List
Team	No.	Drivers	Rounds
(Germany) Grohs Motorsport	1	(Germany) Patrick Simon	All
(Germany) Grohs Motorsport	1	(Germany) Artur Deutgen	–
(Germany) Grohs Motorsport	1	(Germany) Christian Hohenadel	–
(Germany) Grohs Motorsport	2	(Germany) Harald Becker	All
(Germany) SST Engineering	3	(Denmark) Kurt Thiim	All
(Germany) SST Engineering	4	(Germany) Tom Schwister	All
(France) PoleVision Racing	5	(Germany) Roland Asch	All
(France) PoleVision Racing	6	(South Africa) Toby Scheckter	All
(Germany) Irmscher Motorsport	9	(Venezuela) Johnny Cecotto	All
(Germany) MRS Workshop	11	(Germany) Ralf Druckenmüller	All
(Germany) Knüpfing Motorsport	14	(Germany) Timo Rumpfkeil	All
(Germany) Knüpfing Motorsport	15	(Germany) Patrick Hildenbrandt	3–9
(Germany) Knüpfing Motorsport	15	(Germany) Ralf Kelleners	–
(Germany) Knüpfing Motorsport	15	(Germany) Artur Deutgen	–
(Germany) MIS Mönninghoff	16	(Germany) Artur Deutgen	1–4
(Germany) MIS Mönninghoff	16	(Germany) Klaus Panchryz	5–6
(Germany) MIS Mönninghoff	16	(Austria) Robert Lechner	7–9
(Germany) Oliver Mayer Motorsport	18	(Germany) Oliver Mayer	All
(Germany) 1st Choice Racing	21	(Denmark) Kris Nissen	5–9
(Germany) Ryll Racing	22	(Germany) Artur Deutgen	7–9
(Germany) Ryll Racing	22	(Germany) Siegfried Ryll	–
(Germany) GAG Racing Team	27	(Germany) Steffen Widmann	All
(Germany) GAG Racing Team	28	(Germany) Thomas Mutsch	All
(Germany) JAG Racing Team	66	(Germany) Sascha Bert	All
(Germany) JAG Racing Team	88	(Poland) Andrzej Dziurka	1–6
(Germany) JAG Racing Team	88	(Slovakia) Andrej Studenic	7–9
(Germany) Zakspeed Motorsport	77	(Austria) Karl Wendlinger	All
(Germany) Zakspeed Motorsport	99	(Germany) Marcel Tiemann	All

== Race calendar and results ==
2001 Calendar and Results
Round		Circuit	Country	Date	Pole position	Winning driver	Winning team
1	R	(Germany) Motorsport Arena Oschersleben	Germany	April 29	(Venezuela) Johnny Cecotto	(Venezuela) Johnny Cecotto	(Germany) Irmscher Motorsport
2	R	(Germany) EuroSpeedway Lausitz	Germany	May 13		(Venezuela) Johnny Cecotto	(Germany) Irmscher Motorsport
3	R	(Germany) Nürburgring	Germany	May 26	(Germany) Roland Asch	(Germany) Roland Asch	(France) PoleVision Racing
4	R	(Austria) Salzburgring	Austria	June 10		(Venezuela) Johnny Cecotto	(Germany) Irmscher Motorsport
5	R	(Germany) Nürburgring	Germany	July 22	(Denmark) Kurt Thiim	(Germany) Roland Asch	(France) PoleVision Racing
6	R	(Germany) EuroSpeedway Lausitz	Germany	August 5		(Venezuela) Johnny Cecotto	(Germany) Irmscher Motorsport
7	R	(Germany) Hockenheimring	Germany	September 16	(Germany) Roland Asch	(Austria) Robert Lechner	(Germany) MIS Mönninghoff
8	R	(Germany) Nürburgring	Germany	September 30		(Austria) Robert Lechner	(Germany) MIS Mönninghoff
9	R	(Germany) Motorsport Arena Oschersleben	Germany	October 14	(Germany) Ralf Druckenmüller	(Germany) Marcel Tiemann	(Germany) Zakspeed Motorsport

== Championship standings ==
2001 Driver Standings
Pos	Driver	Points
1	(Venezuela) Johnny Cecotto	217
2	(Germany) Roland Asch	203
3	(Germany) Marcel Tiemann	203
4	(Germany) Thomas Mutsch	180
5	(Germany) Ralf Druckenmüller	175
6	(Denmark) Kurt Thiim	172
7	(South Africa) Toby Scheckter	166
8	(Germany) Steffen Widmann	153
9	(Germany) Sascha Bert	150
10	(Germany) Timo Rumpfkeil	143
11	(Austria) Karl Wendlinger	142
12	(Germany) Harald Becker	135
13	(Germany) Tom Schwister	135
14	(Germany) Patrick Simon	116
15	(Austria) Robert Lechner	115
16	(Denmark) Kris Nissen	114
17	(Germany) Artur Deutgen	113
18	(Germany) Oliver Mayer	111
19	(Slovakia) Andrej Studenic	83
20	(Germany) Patrick Hildenbrandt	81
21	(Poland) Andrzej Dziurka	51
22	(Germany) Siegfried Ryll	22
23	(Germany) Christian Hohenadel	18
24	(Germany) Ralf Kelleners	17
25	(Germany) Klaus Panchryz	7
Pos	Driver	Points

2001 Team Standings
Pos	Team	Points
1	(France) PoleVision Racing	330
2	(Germany) Zakspeed Motorsport	306
3	(Germany) GAG Racing Team	289
4	(Germany) SST Engineering	278
5	(Germany) JAG Racing Team	260
6	(Germany) Grohs Motorsport	247
7	(Germany) Knüpfing Motorsport	235
8	(Germany) Irmscher Motorsport	191
9	(Germany) MRS Workshop	161
10	(Germany) MIS Mönninghoff	148
11	(Germany) 1st Choice Racing	114
12	(Germany) Oliver Mayer Motorsport	101
13	(Germany) Ryll Racing	72
Pos	Team	Points

Position	1st	2nd	3rd	4th	5th	6th	7th	8th	9th	10th	11th	12th	13th	14th	15th	16th	17th	18th	19th	20th	21st	22nd	23rd	24th
Points	26	24	23	22	21	20	19	18	17	16	15	14	13	12	11	10	9	8	7	6	5	4	3	2
