= 2003 V8Star Series =

Seasons
- ← 2002 none →

The 2003 V8Star Series season was the third and final V8Star Series season. It featured ten races at four European racing circuits, in Germany and the Netherlands. Portuguese ex-Formula One driver Pedro Lamy was crowned champion of the series, taking five wins in all and beating Germans Thomas Mutsch and Michael Bartels to the title.

== Teams and drivers ==
2003 Entry List
Team	No.	Drivers	Rounds
(Germany) Irmscher Motorsport	2	(Belgium) Yves Olivier	1–2
(Germany) Irmscher Motorsport	2	(Germany) Roland Asch	3–4, 6–7
(United Kingdom) MB Performance	5	(Netherlands) Marco du Pau	5
(United Kingdom) MB Performance	5	(Netherlands) Michael Vergers	9
(United Kingdom) MB Performance	33	(Germany) Michael Bartels	All
(Germany) V8STAR	8	(Germany) Altfried Heger *	5, 9
(Germany) V8STAR	8	(Netherlands) Jan Lammers *	7
(Netherlands) Jetstream Motorsport	9	(Netherlands) Marcel Kesseler	All
(Netherlands) Jetstream Motorsport	10	(Netherlands) Simon Frederiks	All
(Germany) MRS Workshop	11	(Denmark) Kurt Thiim	1, 4–5, 9
(Germany) MRS Workshop	11	(Netherlands) Jaap Kielman	7
(Germany) Grohs Motorsport	14	(Germany) Dennis Rostek	1–3, 6–8
(Germany) MIS Mönninghoff	16	(Germany) Thomas Mutsch	All
(Germany) MIS Mönninghoff	17	(Germany) Klaus Panchryz	1
(Germany) MIS Mönninghoff	17	(Germany) Roland Rehfeld	5
(Germany) Ryll Racing ASL	22	(Germany) Siegfried Ryll	All
(Germany) Ryll Racing ASL	23	(Germany) Sascha Bert	2–7
(Germany) Ryll Racing ASL	23	(Germany) Ronny Melkus	8
(Germany) Ryll Racing ASL	23	(United Kingdom) Kevin Clarke	9
(Germany) Ryll Racing	24	(Germany) Steffen Widmann	1–8
(Germany) Ryll Racing	24	(Netherlands) Marco du Pau	9
(Germany) Ryll Racing	25	(Germany) Ronny Melkus	1–7, 9
(Germany) Ryll Racing	25	(Netherlands) Cor Euser	8
(Germany) GAG Racing Team	27	(Germany) Patrick Michels	1–6
(Germany) GAG Racing Team	27	(Netherlands) Donny Crevels	7–9
(Germany) GAG Racing Team	28	(Germany) Harald Becker	All
(Germany) Sagarage	36	(Germany) Dirk Adorf	1, 3
(Germany) Zakspeed Racing	88	(Portugal) Pedro Lamy	All
(Germany) Zakspeed Racing	99	(Austria) Robert Lechner	All

* Guest driver, no points awarded.

== Race calendar and results ==
2003 Calendar and Results
Round		Circuit	Country	Date	Pole position	Winning driver	Winning team
1	R	(Germany) Nürburgring	Germany	April 20	(Austria) Robert Lechner	(Austria) Robert Lechner	(Germany) Zakspeed Racing
2	R	(Germany) EuroSpeedway Lausitz	Germany	May 11	(Portugal) Pedro Lamy	(Portugal) Pedro Lamy	(Germany) Zakspeed Racing
3	R	(Germany) Nürburgring	Germany	May 31	(Portugal) Pedro Lamy	(Portugal) Pedro Lamy	(Germany) Zakspeed Racing
4	R	(Germany) Sachsenring	Germany	June 15	(Portugal) Pedro Lamy	(Portugal) Pedro Lamy	(Germany) Zakspeed Racing
5	R	(Germany) EuroSpeedway Lausitz	Germany	July 6	(Germany) Thomas Mutsch	(Portugal) Pedro Lamy	(Germany) Zakspeed Racing
6	R	(Germany) Nürburgring	Germany	July 20	(Germany) Michael Bartels	(Germany) Roland Asch	(Germany) Irmscher Motorsport
7	R	(Netherlands) Circuit Park Zandvoort	Netherlands	August 10	(Netherlands) Donny Crevels	(Netherlands) Donny Crevels	(Germany) GAG Racing Team
8	R	(Netherlands) Circuit Park Zandvoort	Netherlands	September 7	(Austria) Robert Lechner	(Austria) Robert Lechner	(Germany) Zakspeed Racing
9	R1	(Germany) EuroSpeedway Lausitz	Germany	September 13	(Netherlands) Donny Crevels	(Austria) Robert Lechner	(Germany) Zakspeed Racing
9	R2	(Germany) EuroSpeedway Lausitz	Germany	September 14	(Austria) Robert Lechner	(Portugal) Pedro Lamy	(Germany) Zakspeed Racing

== Championship standings ==
2003 Driver Standings
Pos	Driver	Points
1	(Portugal) Pedro Lamy	271
2	(Germany) Thomas Mutsch	249
3	(Germany) Michael Bartels	249
4	(Austria) Robert Lechner	235
5	(Netherlands) Marcel Kesseler	179
6	(Germany) Harald Becker	172
7	(Netherlands) Simon Frederiks	172
8	(Germany) Steffen Widmann	170
9	(Germany) Ronny Melkus	165
10	(Germany) Siegfried Ryll	161
11	(Germany) Roland Asch	117
12	(Germany) Patrick Michels	107
13	(Germany) Dennis Rostek	105
14	(Denmark) Kurt Thiim	98
15	(Netherlands) Donny Crevels	84
16	(Germany) Sascha Bert	80
17	(Germany) Dirk Adorf	53
18	(Netherlands) Michael Vergers	47
19	(Belgium) Yves Olivier	40
20	(Netherlands) Cor Euser	26
21	(Netherlands) Marco du Pau	24
22	(Germany) Klaus Panchryz	23
23	(United Kingdom) Kevin Clarke	0
24	(Netherlands) Jaap Kielman	0
25	(Germany) Roland Rehfeld	0
guest drivers ineligible for points
	(Germany) Altfried Heger	0
	(Netherlands) Jan Lammers	0
Pos	Driver	Points

2003 Team Standings
Pos	Team	Points
1	(Germany) Zakspeed Racing	506
2	(Germany) GAG Racing Team	363
3	(Germany) Ryll Racing	361
4	(Netherlands) Jetstream Motorsport	351
5	(United Kingdom) MB Performance	296
6	(Germany) MIS Mönninghoff	272
7	(Germany) Ryll Racing ASL	265
8	(Germany) Irmscher Motorsport	157
9	(Germany) Grohs Motorsport	105
10	(Germany) MRS Workshop	98
11	(Germany) Sagarage	53
guest teams ineligible for points
	(Germany) V8STAR	0
Pos	Team	Points

Position	1st	2nd	3rd	4th	5th	6th	7th	8th	9th	10th	11th	12th	13th	14th	15th	16th	17th	18th	19th	20th	21st	22nd	23rd	24th	25th	26th	27th	28th	29th	30th
Points	32	30	29	28	27	26	25	24	23	22	21	20	19	18	17	16	15	14	13	12	11	10	9	8	7	6	5	4	3	2
