= Günther Irmscher =

German Rally Driver

Günther Irmscher (1937 – 9 February 1996) was a German rally driver and entrepreneur. In 1968 he founded the company Irmscher Automobilbau in Winnenden near Stuttgart, South Germany. The first time they made tuning parts for Opel cars. He started with Opel Kadett (1977), then Opel Manta (1983), Opel Senator, Opel Omega (both 1990).

Irmscher was the winner of the Deutsche Tourenwagen Meisterschaft in 1965 on NSU Prinz TT. 1967 he was the winner of the Rallye Tour d’Europe, also on NSU Prinz TT.
