= 1996 ITC Hockenheim-2 round =

1996 International Car Championship

(Germany) 1996 ITC Hockenheim-2 round
Round details
- Round 11 of 13 rounds in the 1996 International Touring Car Championship
- Layout of the Hockenheimring
- Location: Hockenheimring, Hockenheim, Germany
- Course: Permanent racing facility 6.823 km (4.240 mi)

International Touring Car Championship

Race 1
- Date: 13 October 1996
- Laps: 15

Pole position
Driver	(Germany) Klaus Ludwig	Zakspeed Opel
- Time: 2:04.877

Podium
First	(Germany) Klaus Ludwig	Zakspeed Opel
Second	(Germany) Manuel Reuter	Joest Racing Opel
Third	(Germany) Uwe Alzen	Zakspeed Opel

Fastest lap
Driver	(Germany) Uwe Alzen	Zakspeed Opel
- Time: 2:08.836 (on lap 10)

Race 2
- Date: 13 October 1996
- Laps: 15

Podium
First	(Germany) Manuel Reuter	Joest Racing Opel
Second	(Germany) Klaus Ludwig	Zakspeed Opel
Third	(Germany) Jörg van Ommen	UPS Mercedes-AMG

Fastest lap
Driver	(Germany) Manuel Reuter	Joest Racing Opel
- Time: 2:07.995 (on lap 11)

The 1996 ITC Hockenheim-2 round was the eleventh round of the 1996 International Touring Car Championship season. It took place on 13 October at the Hockenheimring.

Klaus Ludwig won the first race, starting from pole position, and Manuel Reuter gained the second one, both driving an Opel Calibra V6 4x4.

== Classification ==
=== Qualifying ===
Pos.	No.	Driver	Car	Team	Time	Grid
1	17	(Germany) Klaus Ludwig	Opel Calibra V6 4x4	(Germany) Zakspeed Opel	2:04.877	1
2	5	(Italy) Nicola Larini	Alfa Romeo 155 V6 TI	(Italy) Martini Alfa Corse	2:05.092	2
3	7	(Germany) Manuel Reuter	Opel Calibra V6 4x4	(Germany) Joest Racing Opel	2:05.135	3
4	2	(United Kingdom) Dario Franchitti	Mercedes C-Class	(Germany) D2 Mercedes-AMG	2:05.174	4
5	16	(Germany) Uwe Alzen	Opel Calibra V6 4x4	(Germany) Zakspeed Opel	2:05.264	5
6	1	(Germany) Bernd Schneider	Mercedes C-Class	(Germany) D2 Mercedes-AMG	2:05.403	6
7	18	(Italy) Gabriele Tarquini	Alfa Romeo 155 V6 TI	(Italy) JAS Motorsport Alfa Romeo	2:06.022	7
8	3	(Denmark) Jan Magnussen	Mercedes C-Class	(Germany) Warsteiner Mercedes-AMG	2:06.071	8
9	44	(Germany) Hans-Joachim Stuck	Opel Calibra V6 4x4	(Germany) Team Rosberg Opel	2:06.075	9
10	43	(Finland) JJ Lehto	Opel Calibra V6 4x4	(Germany) Team Rosberg Opel	2:06.323	10
11	6	(Italy) Alessandro Nannini	Alfa Romeo 155 V6 TI	(Italy) Martini Alfa Corse	2:06.526	11
12	15	(Germany) Christian Danner	Alfa Romeo 155 V6 TI	(Italy) TV Spielfilm Alfa Corse	2:06.529	12
13	10	(Germany) Michael Bartels	Alfa Romeo 155 V6 TI	(Italy) Jägermeister JAS Motorsport Alfa Romeo	2:06.529	13
14	11	(Germany) Jörg van Ommen	Mercedes C-Class	(Germany) UPS Mercedes-AMG	2:06.705	14
15	14	(Italy) Giancarlo Fisichella	Alfa Romeo 155 V6 TI	(Italy) TV Spielfilm Alfa Corse	2:06.740	15
16	12	(Denmark) Nicki Thiim	Mercedes C-Class	(Germany) UPS Mercedes-AMG	2:06.897	16
17	24	(France) Yannick Dalmas	Opel Calibra V6 4x4	(Germany) Joest Racing Opel	2:07.139	17
18	25	(Austria) Alexander Wurz	Opel Calibra V6 4x4	(Germany) Joest Racing Opel	2:07.236	18
19	9	(Italy) Stefano Modena	Alfa Romeo 155 V6 TI	(Italy) JAS Motorsport Alfa Romeo	2:07.428	19
20	4	(Germany) Bernd Mayländer	Mercedes C-Class	(Germany) Warsteiner Mercedes-AMG	2:07.460	20
21	19	(Denmark) Jason Watt	Alfa Romeo 155 V6 TI	(Italy) Bosch JAS Motorsport Alfa Romeo	2:07.743	21
22	21	(Germany) Alexander Grau	Mercedes C-Class	(Germany) Persson Motorsport	2:07.908	22
23	22	(Germany) Ellen Lohr	Mercedes C-Class	(Germany) Persson Motorsport	2:09.268	23
24	27	(Japan) Masanori Sekiya	Opel Calibra V6 4x4	(Germany) Joest Racing Opel	2:10.134	24
25	13	(Italy) Gianni Giudici	Opel Calibra V6 4x4	(Italy) Giudici Motorsport	2:10.568	25

=== Race 1 ===
Pos.	No.	Driver	Car	Team	Laps	Time/Retired	Grid	Points
1	17	(Germany) Klaus Ludwig	Opel Calibra V6 4x4	(Germany) Zakspeed Opel	15	32:23.287	1	20
2	7	(Germany) Manuel Reuter	Opel Calibra V6 4x4	(Germany) Joest Racing Opel	15	+0.205	3	15
3	16	(Germany) Uwe Alzen	Opel Calibra V6 4x4	(Germany) Zakspeed Opel	15	+0.959	5	12
4	18	(Italy) Gabriele Tarquini	Alfa Romeo 155 V6 TI	(Italy) JAS Motorsport Alfa Romeo	15	+6.893	7	10
5	43	(Finland) JJ Lehto	Opel Calibra V6 4x4	(Germany) Team Rosberg Opel	15	+8.514	10	8
6	6	(Italy) Alessandro Nannini	Alfa Romeo 155 V6 TI	(Italy) Martini Alfa Corse	15	+25.033	11	6
7	15	(Germany) Christian Danner	Alfa Romeo 155 V6 TI	(Italy) TV Spielfilm Alfa Corse	15	+25.263	12	4
8	11	(Germany) Jörg van Ommen	Mercedes C-Class	(Germany) UPS Mercedes-AMG	15	+27.370	14	3
9	4	(Germany) Bernd Mayländer	Mercedes C-Class	(Germany) Warsteiner Mercedes-AMG	15	+28.853	20	2
10	12	(Denmark) Kurt Thiim	Mercedes C-Class	(Germany) UPS Mercedes-AMG	15	+29.008	16	1
11	22	(Germany) Ellen Lohr	Mercedes C-Class	(Germany) Persson Motorsport	15	+1:06.560	23	
12	14	(Italy) Giancarlo Fisichella	Alfa Romeo 155 V6 TI	(Italy) TV Spielfilm Alfa Corse	15	+1:16.222	15	
13	10	(Germany) Michael Bartels	Alfa Romeo 155 V6 TI	(Italy) Jägermeister JAS Motorsport Alfa Romeo	15	+1:29.850	6	
14	1	(Germany) Bernd Schneider	Mercedes C-Class	(Germany) D2 Mercedes-AMG	14	Retired	6	
15	27	(Japan) Masanori Sekiya	Opel Calibra V6 4x4	(Germany) Joest Racing Opel	14	+1 lap^{1}	24	
16	13	(Italy) Gianni Giudici	Opel Calibra V6 4x4	(Italy) Giudici Motorsport	14	+1 lap	25	
17	44	(Germany) Hans-Joachim Stuck	Opel Calibra V6 4x4	(Germany) Team Rosberg Opel	13	Retired	9	
18	24	(France) Yannick Dalmas	Opel Calibra V6 4x4	(Germany) Joest Racing Opel	13	Retired	17	
Ret	25	(Austria) Alexander Wurz	Opel Calibra V6 4x4	(Germany) Joest Racing Opel	13	Retired	18	
Ret	3	(Denmark) Jan Magnussen	Mercedes C-Class	(Germany) UPS Mercedes-AMG	13	Retired	8	
Ret	5	(Italy) Nicola Larini	Alfa Romeo 155 V6 TI	(Italy) Martini Alfa Corse	11	Retired	2	
Ret	9	(Italy) Stefano Modena	Alfa Romeo 155 V6 TI	(Italy) JAS Motorsport Alfa Romeo	11	Retired	19	
Ret	2	(United Kingdom) Dario Franchitti	Mercedes C-Class	(Germany) D2 Mercedes-AMG	7	Retired	4	
Ret	21	(Germany) Alexander Grau	Mercedes C-Class	(Germany) Persson Motorsport	2	Retired	22	
Ret	19	(Denmark) Jason Watt	Alfa Romeo 155 V6 TI	(Italy) Bosch JAS Motorsport Alfa Romeo	1	Retired	21	

Notes:

- ^1 – Masanori Sekiya was given a 10-second penalty for cutting the track.

=== Race 2 ===
Pos.	No.	Driver	Car	Team	Laps	Time/Retired	Grid	Points
1	7	(Germany) Manuel Reuter	Opel Calibra V6 4x4	(Germany) Joest Racing Opel	15	32:11.295	2	20
2	17	(Germany) Klaus Ludwig	Opel Calibra V6 4x4	(Germany) Zakspeed Opel	15	+1.122	1	15
3	11	(Germany) Jörg van Ommen	Mercedes C-Class	(Germany) UPS Mercedes-AMG	15	+10.006	8	12
4	3	(Denmark) Jan Magnussen	Mercedes C-Class	(Germany) Warsteiner Mercedes-AMG	15	+13.319	20	10
5	14	(Italy) Giancarlo Fisichella	Alfa Romeo 155 V6 TI	(Italy) TV Spielfilm Alfa Corse	15	+13.721	12	8
6	15	(Germany) Christian Danner	Alfa Romeo 155 V6 TI	(Italy) TV Spielfilm Alfa Corse	15	+19.188	7	6
7	2	(United Kingdom) Dario Franchitti	Mercedes C-Class	(Germany) D2 Mercedes-AMG	15	+25.175	23	4
8	43	(Finland) JJ Lehto	Opel Calibra V6 4x4	(Germany) Team Rosberg Opel	15	+36.686	5	3
9	44	(Germany) Hans-Joachim Stuck	Opel Calibra V6 4x4	(Germany) Team Rosberg Opel	15	+36.924	17	2
10	9	(Italy) Stefano Modena	Alfa Romeo 155 V6 TI	(Italy) JAS Motorsport Alfa Romeo	15	+41.635	22	1
11	22	(Germany) Ellen Lohr	Mercedes C-Class	(Germany) Persson Motorsport	15	+57.770	11	
12	21	(Germany) Alexander Grau	Mercedes C-Class	(Germany) Persson Motorsport	15	+58.000	24	
13	27	(Japan) Masanori Sekiya	Opel Calibra V6 4x4	(Germany) Joest Racing Opel	15	+59.266	15	
Ret	6	(Italy) Alessandro Nannini	Alfa Romeo 155 V6 TI	(Italy) Martini Alfa Corse	10	Retired	6	
Ret	4	(Germany) Bernd Mayländer	Mercedes C-Class	(Germany) Warsteiner Mercedes-AMG	9	Retired	9	
Ret	1	(Germany) Bernd Schneider	Mercedes C-Class	(Germany) D2 Mercedes-AMG	9	Retired	14	
Ret	19	(Denmark) Jason Watt	Alfa Romeo 155 V6 TI	(Italy) Bosch JAS Motorsport Alfa Romeo	6	Retired	25	
Ret	12	(Denmark) Kurt Thiim	Mercedes C-Class	(Germany) UPS Mercedes-AMG	6	Retired	10	
Ret	18	(Italy) Gabriele Tarquini	Alfa Romeo 155 V6 TI	(Italy) JAS Motorsport Alfa Romeo	3	Retired	4	
Ret	24	(France) Yannick Dalmas	Opel Calibra V6 4x4	(Germany) Joest Racing Opel	3	Retired	18	
Ret	10	(Germany) Michael Bartels	Alfa Romeo 155 V6 TI	(Italy) Jägermeister JAS Motorsport Alfa Romeo	2	Retired	13	
Ret	5	(Italy) Nicola Larini	Alfa Romeo 155 V6 TI	(Italy) Martini Alfa Corse	2	Retired	21	
Ret	16	(Germany) Uwe Alzen	Opel Calibra V6 4x4	(Germany) Zakspeed Opel	1	Retired	3	
Ret	13	(Italy) Gianni Giudici	Opel Calibra V6 4x4	(Italy) Giudici Motorsport	1	Retired	16	
DNS	25	(Austria) Alexander Wurz	Opel Calibra V6 4x4	(Germany) Joest Racing Opel		Did not start	19	

== Standings after the event ==
Drivers' Championship standings

	Pos	Driver	Points
1	1	(Germany) Manuel Reuter	198
1	2	(Germany) Bernd Schneider	165
	3	(United Kingdom) Dario Franchitti	150
	4	(Italy) Alessandro Nannini	143
	5	(Finland) JJ Lehto	137

Manufacturers' Championship standings

Pos	Driver	Points
1	(Germany) Opel	324
2	(Italy) Alfa Romeo	270
3	(Germany) Mercedes	245

- Note: Only the top five positions are included for both sets of drivers' standings.
