= Hockenheimring =

Race track in Hockenheim, Germany

- Grand Prix Circuit (2002–present)
- Location: Am Motodrom, Hockenheim, Baden-Württemberg, Germany
- Coordinates: 49°19′40″N 8°33′57″E
- Capacity: 70,000
- FIA Grade: 1 (Grand Prix); 3 (National) (Note: Hockenheimring's Grade 3 licence expired 3 April 2025.)
- Broke ground: 23 March 1932; 94 years ago
- Opened: 29 May 1932; 94 years ago
- Former names: Kurpfalzring (1938–1965); Hockenheimer-Dreieck (1932–1938)
- Major events: Current: DTM (2000–present); International GT Open (2019, 2024–2026); European Drag Racing Championship NitrolympX (1986–2019, 2022–present); Former: Formula One; German Grand Prix (Intermittently, 1970–2019); Grand Prix motorcycle racing German motorcycle Grand Prix (Intermittently, 1957–1994); FIA World RX; World RX of Hockenheim (2015–2017); TCR Europe (2016, 2019, 2025); GT World Challenge Europe (2022–2024); World SBK (1988–1997, 1999–2000); FIM EWC (1986); FIA GT (1997–1999, 2004); World Sportscar Championship (1966–1967, 1977, 1985)
- Website: http://www.hockenheimring.net

Grand Prix Circuit (2002–present)
- Surface: Asphalt
- Length: 4.574 km (2.842 mi)
- Turns: 17
- Race lap record: 1:13.780 ( (Finland) Kimi Räikkönen, McLaren MP4-19B, 2004, F1)

National Circuit (2002–present)
- Surface: Asphalt
- Length: 3.736 km (2.321 mi)
- Turns: 15
- Race lap record: 1:19.742 ( (Spain) Daniel Juncadella, Dallara F309, 2010, F3)

Short Circuit (1966–2001)
- Surface: Asphalt
- Length: 2.638 km (1.639 mi)
- Turns: 11
- Race lap record: 0:57.450 ( (Austria) Josef Neuhauser, Minardi M190, 2001, F1)

Hockenheimring (1994–2001)
- Surface: Asphalt, concrete
- Length: 6.823 km (4.240 mi)
- Turns: 16
- Race lap record: 1:41.808 ( (Colombia) Juan Pablo Montoya, Williams FW23, 2001, F1)

Hockenheimring (1992–1993)
- Surface: Asphalt
- Length: 6.815 km (4.235 mi)
- Turns: 16
- Race lap record: 1:41.591 ( (Italy) Riccardo Patrese, Williams FW14B, 1992, F1)

Hockenheimring (1982–1991)
- Surface: Asphalt
- Length: 6.802 km (4.227 mi)
- Turns: 16
- Race lap record: 1:43.569 ( (Italy) Riccardo Patrese, Williams FW14, 1991, F1)

Hockenheimring (1970–1981)
- Surface: Asphalt
- Length: 6.790 km (4.219 mi)
- Turns: 14
- Race lap record: 1:48.490 ( (Australia) Alan Jones, Williams FW07B, 1980, F1)

Hockenheimring (1966–1970)
- Surface: Asphalt
- Length: 6.769 km (4.206 mi)
- Turns: 10
- Race lap record: 1:54.600 ( (United Kingdom) Trevor Taylor, Surtees TS5, 1969, F5000)

Kurpfalzring (1938–1965)
- Surface: Asphalt
- Length: 7.692 km (4.780 mi)
- Turns: 7
- Race lap record: 2:13.300 ( (United Kingdom) Bob McIntyre, Gilera Saturno, 1957, 500cc)

Hockenheimer-Dreieck (1932–1938)
- Surface: Asphalt
- Length: 12.045 km (7.484 mi)
- Turns: 9

The Hockenheimring, officially Hockenheimring Baden-Württemberg (German: [ˈhɔkŋ̍haɪmʁɪŋ ˌbaːdn̩ ˈvʏʁtəmbɛʁk]), is a motor racing circuit situated in the Rhine valley near the town of Hockenheim in Baden-Württemberg, Germany, located on the Bertha Benz Memorial Route. Amongst other motor racing events, it has hosted the German Grand Prix, most recently in 2019. The circuit is nearly flat. The circuit has an FIA Grade 1 licence.

== History ==
The original layout of the track, called "Dreieckskurs", used between 1932 and 1938

=== 1932–1938 ===
Originally called "Dreieckskurs" (triangle course), the Hockenheimring was built in 1932. The man behind it is Ernst Christ, a young timekeeper who felt that a racing track should be built in his hometown of Hockenheim. He submitted the plans to the mayor and they were approved on Christmas day, in 1931. This first layout of the track was around twelve kilometres long and consisted of a large triangle-like section, a hairpin in the city and two straights connecting them.

=== 1938–1965 ===
The layout of the track used between 1938 and 1965

In 1938, the circuit dramatically shortened, from twelve kilometres down to just over seven and a half, and the Ostkurve corner, which lasted until 2001, was introduced for the first time. In that year, the track was also renamed to "Kurpfalzring". The track was damaged by tanks during World War II. After the war, the track was repaired, and renamed to "Hockenheimring". Former DKW and NSU factory rider and world record setter Wilhelm Herz became the manager of the track in 1954 and promoted the track successfully; Grand Prix motorcycle racing events were held, with the German motorcycle Grand Prix alternating between the Hockenheimring and other tracks. This version of the circuit was just over seven and a half kilometres long and consisted of the original two long straights, with the Ostkurve in the forest and the original hairpin inside Hockenheim joining them together.

=== 1965–2001 ===
In 1965, when the new Autobahn A 6 separated the village from the main part of the track, a new version of Hockenheim circuit was built, with the "Motodrom" stadium section, designed by John Hugenholtz, who also designed Suzuka. After Jim Clark was killed on 7 April 1968 in a Formula 2 racing accident, two fast chicanes were added and the track was lined with crash barriers in 1970. A small memorial was placed near the first chicane (which was named after him), at the site of his accident. In 1982, another chicane was added at the Ostkurve (east curve), after Patrick Depailler was killed there in 1980, and the first chicane was made slower as well. For the 1992 German Grand Prix, the Ostkurve was changed yet again, from a quick right turn into a more complex right-left-right chicane, after Érik Comas crashed there in 1991. The second chicane was renamed after Ayrton Senna, after his death at the 1994 San Marino Grand Prix.

This version used to be quite large, with a very long and very fast section going through forests essentially consisting of four straights of roughly 1.3 km (0.81 mi), separated by a chicane sequence, followed by a more tight and twisty "stadium" section (so called because of all the grandstands situated there) named Motodrom. This made the setting up of racing cars difficult, since a choice had to be made – whether to run low downforce to optimize speed through the straights and compromise grip in the stadium section, or, run more downforce to optimize grip through the stadium section and compromise speed on the straights. The long track length also meant that a typical Formula One race had only 45 laps, limiting the spectators' experience of the race to only that many passes through the stadium.

During the mid-1980s "turbo era" of Formula One where fuel was restricted to either 220 (1984–1985), 195 (1986–1987) or 150 (1988) litres for races for the turbo powered cars, Hockenheim also saw drivers, including World Champion Alain Prost, at times fail to finish due to simply running out of fuel near the end of the race. Prost ran out at the end of the 1986 race, pushing his McLaren towards the line before giving up. He was placed 3rd when he ran dry and was eventually classified 6th, gaining a valuable championship point that would help him with his second World Championship.

The last version of old Hockenheimring layout (1992–2001)

Many problems came to light during the 2000 German Grand Prix, which was won by Brazilian driver Rubens Barrichello from having started 18th on the grid. The race finished in changeable weather conditions, with pouring rain in the stadium sector and almost completely dry forest straights. All the overtaking moves that took place during the race were in the chicanes of the forest sector, meaning hardly any spectators saw most of the best action. Midway through the race, a former Mercedes-Benz employee, who had been dismissed, breached the track's security barriers on the first forest straight, showing vulnerable security facilities in the forest and leading to the deployment of the safety car that neutralized a comfortable lead for the two Mercedes-powered McLarens. Later on, French driver Jean Alesi collided with Brazilian Pedro Diniz in the braking zone for the third chicane and his car spun uncontrollably down the track, which caused him to suffer dizziness for three days.

These events prompted much protest from the FIA to greatly improve spectator viewing, safety, and security at the track, claiming that the track was no longer suited to modern Formula One racing.

=== 2002 redesign ===
Current track compared to previous track

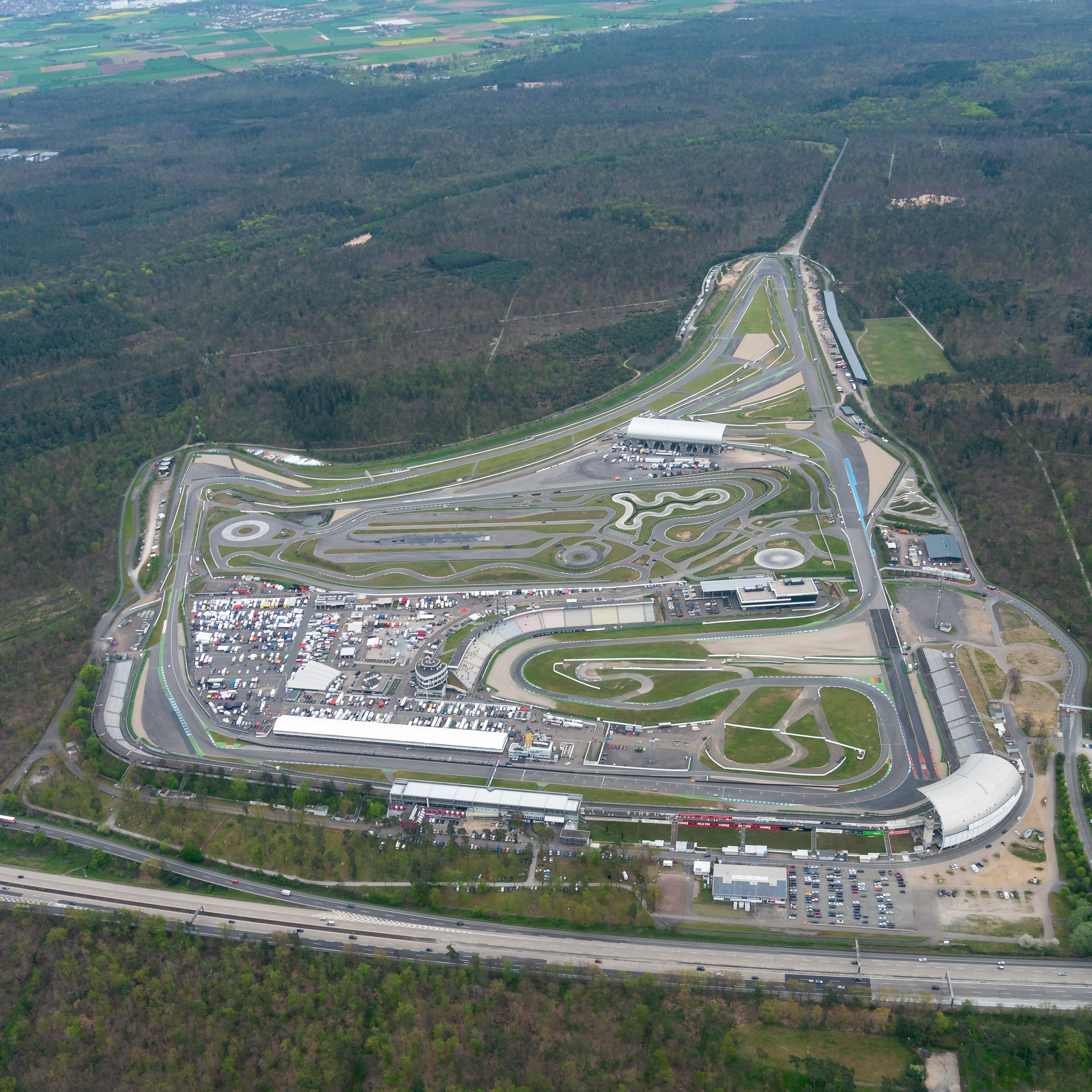
Aerial view of the track in 2023 with remains of the old track layout visible in the forest (upper left)

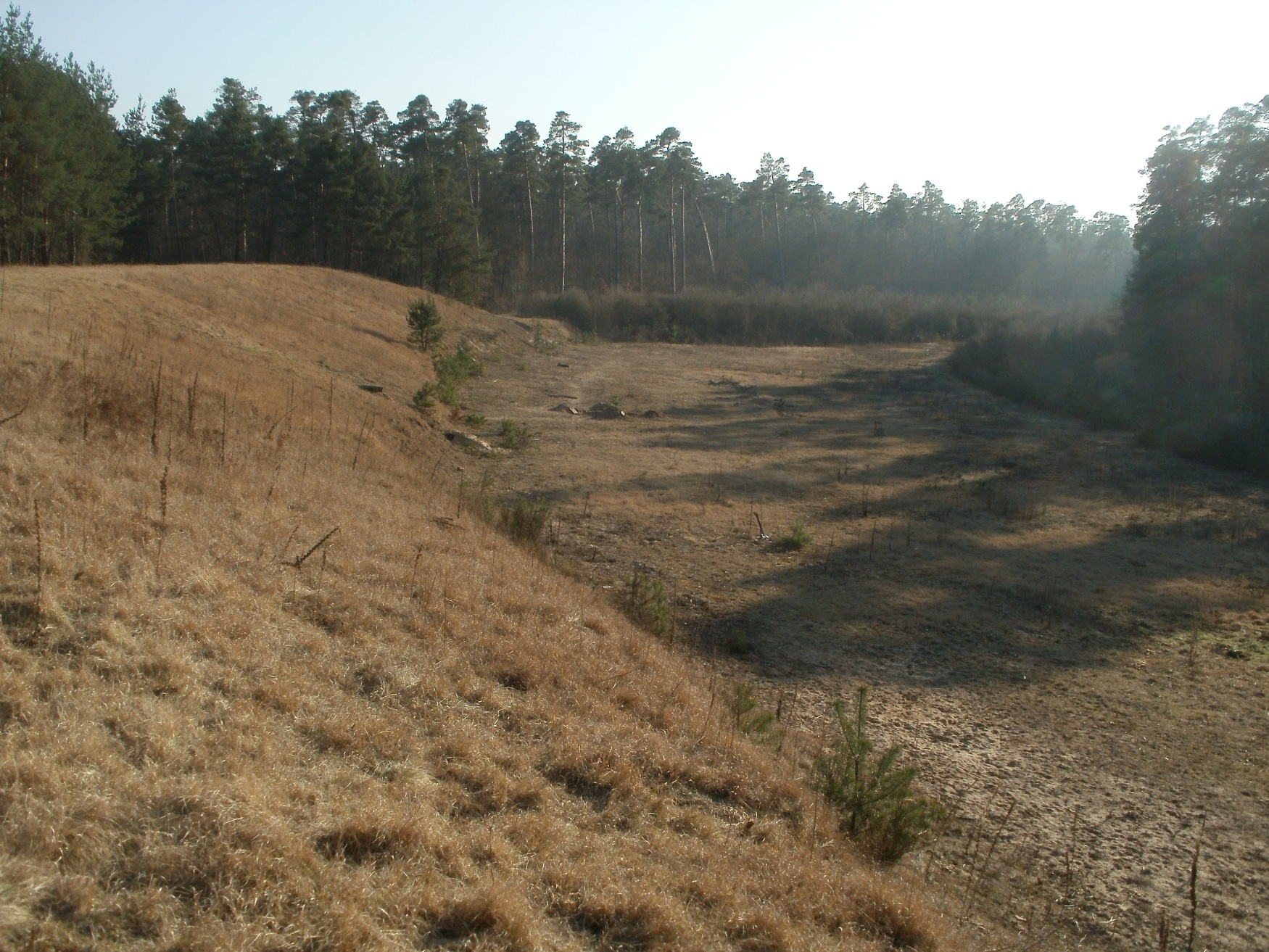
Remains of the Ostkurve in early 2012

In the early 2000s, F1 officials demanded the 6.823 km (4.240 mi) track be shortened and threatened to discontinue racing there, threatening to relocate to other tracks such as the EuroSpeedway Lausitz and sites in Asia. The state government of Baden-Württemberg secured the financing for the redesign by Hermann Tilke for the 2002 German Grand Prix. The stadium section remained mostly intact, despite a new surface and a tighter Turn 1 ("Nordkurve"). However, the circuit was dramatically shortened, with the long, forested straights section chopped off in favour of more tight corners. More than half of the first straight and almost all of the straight between the Ostkurve and Senna chicane were cut and the rest was connected with a new long straight called the "Parabolika", with a small kink being added between the first straight and the new one. A small right-left-right complex was added to the remaining part of the final straight, with a new grandstand overlooking it. In an extremely controversial move, the old forest section was torn up and replanted with trees, eliminating any chance of using the old course either for future F1 events or for historic car events.

There was and still remains a great deal of criticism of the track redesign, in terms of ruining the previous unique technical challenges of the old Hockenheim circuit and delivering a new homogenised "assembly line" circuit without the character of the previous layout, whilst being beset by the perceived problems of other Tilke circuits. Several drivers and team principals, including Ron Dennis, Jarno Trulli and Juan Pablo Montoya, criticised the changes and stated their preference for the old circuit.

The change in the track layout also saw the installation of a new memorial to Jim Clark. This is located at the outside of the current track's turn 2, where the old track continued out into the forests, and the new shortened track turns to the right.

The new track has a seating capacity of 120,000, due to new large grandstands sponsored by Mercedes-Benz. The complex also features a quarter-mile track for drag racing. It hosts one of the largest drag racing events in Europe, known as the NitrOlympx, and was one of the last Top Fuel circuits to race to 0.250 mi (0.402 km) before the FIA switched the nitro categories to the now-recognised 1,000 ft (300 m) distance in 2012.

== Formula One ==
The Hockenheim Circuit hosted the German Grand Prix for the first time in 1970 when the F1 drivers decided at the French Grand Prix to boycott the allegedly dangerous Nürburgring unless major changes were made. The next year the German Grand Prix went back to the Nürburgring until the 1976 German Grand Prix. From 1977 to 2006, the Hockenheimring hosted the German Grand Prix with the exception of 1985, when the race was held at the reconfigured Nürburgring.

In July 2006, Bernie Ecclestone announced that from 2007 onwards, there would be only one Grand Prix per year in Germany. Since 1995, there had been two Grands Prix every year in Germany; the German Grand Prix at Hockenheim, plus either the European Grand Prix or the Luxembourg Grand Prix at the Nürburgring. From 2007, the Nürburgring and Hockenheimring alternated hosting the German Grand Prix, starting with the Nürburgring in 2007.

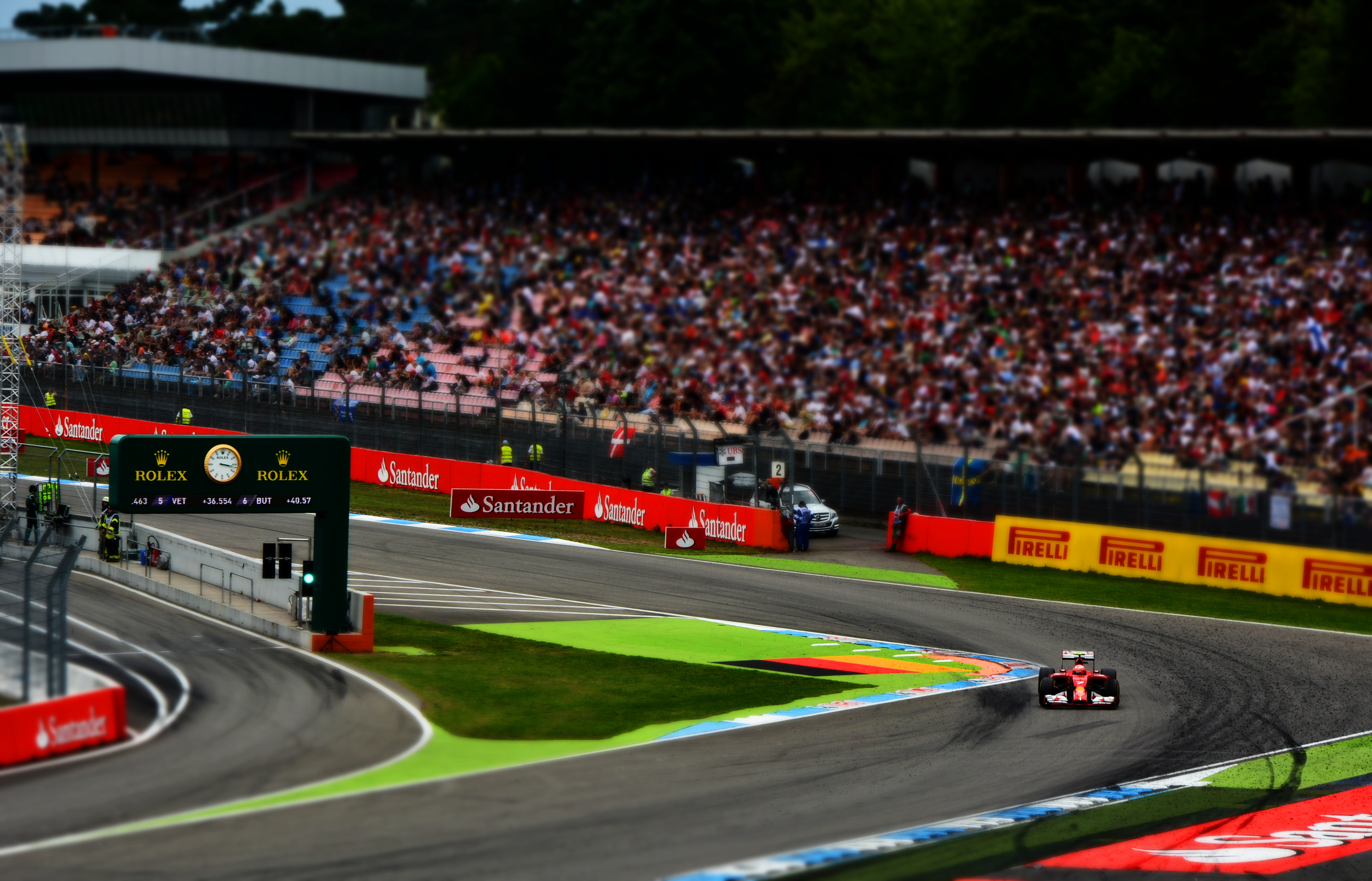
Kimi Räikkönen at the Nordkurve during the 2014 German Grand Prix

Ongoing deficits of the Formula One races, amounting to up to 5.3 million Euro per race that had to be covered by the local communities, made it likely the contract between the Hockenheimring and Formula One Management would not be extended after the Grand Prix of 2010. However, in October 2009 the contract for the circuit to hold the German GP was extended to 2018, with the FOA agreeing to cover any losses the event incurs. Neither Hockenheim nor the Nürburgring hosted a Grand Prix in 2015 or 2017 after the Nürburgring failed to complete an agreement with Formula 1's commercial rights holder Bernie Ecclestone. 2019 was the last time the facility hosted the German Grand Prix, which was sponsored by Mercedes-Benz, celebrating the German manufacturer's 125th year in motorsport.

== Drag racing (NitrolympX – Rico Anthes Quarter Mile) ==
From 1986 to 1988, the start–finish straight was used for 1/8 mile drag racing. In 1989, a proper drag strip was built by connecting the Opel-Kurve and the first turn entering the Motodrom section. The finish line was at the beginning of the forest, with a very long run-off on the straight in the forest. Competitors had to travel around the full race track in opposite direction to return to the paddock.

The drag strip is only used for two events in August, the Public Race Days and the NitrolympX main event a week later. Originally named the Nitrolympics and featuring Top Fuel dragsters, it was renamed to NitrolympX.

When the Hockenheimring was shortened in 2002, the drag strip was moved back, closer to the new tall Tower stands that allow an unusual view along the drag strip. Even though the run off was cut in half it remains one of the longest in drag racing. The NitrolympX usually host most European Drag Racing Championship, sanctioned by FIA or FIM, plus jet dragsters and other entertaining events on the Saturday night show that draws 40,000 spectators.

The drag strip in 2008 was christened Rico Anthes Quarter Mile after the German former Top Fuel driver and long-time organizer of the NitrolympX had retired in 2007. As the dragstrip can only be prepared for professional drag racing after the last major circuit event, mainly the Formula One race, the grip is often sub par compared to permanent drag strips that host two Euro Championship events each year, like Santa Pod Raceway in England or Tierp Arena in Sweden. The best performances on the full quarter-mile were significantly below those in Santa Pod, and the best ET was set in 2005: 4.873 sec. and 458 km/h by Brady Kalivoda (USA).

In 2012, some Pro classes could not find traction as Formula One had demanded a new surface. In subsequent years, the organizers provided a better track, with support from Santa Pod personnel and machinery. In 2016, Hockenheim, and mainland Europe, finally saw the first 3-second Top Fuel 1000 ft passes, with 3.939 sec. and 486.91 km/h (302.55 mph) by Anita Mäkelä (FIN). An overall European record for Super Street Bike was set by Garry Bowe (GB) with 7.04s 340.69 km/h (211.69 mph).

== DTM ==
The DTM (Deutsche Tourenwagen Masters) series has regularly raced at the Hockenheimring since its revival in 2000. In most years, the DTM has competed there twice during a season.

== Rallycross ==
Located in the stadia section of the track, the rallycross track uses a section of track from turns 11 to 16, combined with a dirt section in front of the grandstands. It hosted first ever World RX of Hockenheim, round 2 of FIA World Rallycross Championship in 2015 as supporting event of DTM. WRX also combined with the DTM for an event there in 2017.

== Layout history ==
=== Current circuit configurations ===
Hockenheimring Grand Prix Circuit (2002–present)

Hockenheimring Short Circuit 2 (2002–present)

Rallycross Circuit (2015–present)

Comparison between old layouts and new layouts of Hockenheimring

=== Previous configurations ===
Hockenheimer-Dreieck (1932–1938)

Kurpfalzring (1938–1965)

Comparison between Kurpfalzring and Hockenheimer-Dreieck

Comparison between Hockenheimring and Kurpfalzring

Hockenheimring Grand Prix Circuit (1966–1969)

Hockenheimring Grand Prix Circuit (1970–1981) and Motorcycling Circuit (1982–2001)

Hockenheimring Grand Prix Circuit (1982–1991)

Hockenheimring Grand Prix Circuit (1992–2001)

Hockenheimring Short Circuit (1966–2002)

== Lap records ==
Official record lap times are only set during the race. The fastest ever lap on the track is 1:11.212 set by Sebastian Vettel in a Ferrari SF71H during qualifying at the 2018 German Grand Prix. As of October 2026, the fastest official race lap records at the Hockenheimring are listed as:

Category	Time	Driver	Vehicle	Event
Current Grand Prix Circuit (2002–present): 4.574 km (2.842 mi)
Formula One	1:13.780	(Finland) Kimi Räikkönen	McLaren MP4-19B	2004 German Grand Prix
GP2	1:23.110	(Mexico) Sergio Pérez	Dallara GP2/08	2010 Hockenheim GP2 round
Interserie	1:24.895	(Germany) Arnold Wagner	Reynard 95D	2002 Hockenheim Interserie round
Formula Renault 3.5	1:28.921	(Argentina) Esteban Guerrieri	Dallara T08	2010 Hockenheim Formula Renault 3.5 Series round
F3000	1:29.654	(Brazil) Ricardo Sperafico	Lola B02/50	2002 Hockenheimring F3000 round
Class 1 Touring Car	1:30.401	(Brazil) Pietro Fittipaldi	Audi RS5 Turbo DTM 2019	2019 1st Hockenheim DTM round
GP3	1:31.198	(United Kingdom) Jann Mardenborough	Dallara GP3/10	2014 Hockenheim GP3 Series round
Formula Three	1:32.271	(Germany) Maximilian Günther	Dallara F317	2017 Hockenheim F3 round
DTM	1:32.456	(United Kingdom) Jamie Green	Audi RS5 DTM	2017 2nd Hockenheim DTM round
Super GT (GT500)	1:32.536	(New Zealand) Nick Cassidy	Lexus LC 500 GT500	2019 2nd Hockenheim DTM round
Euroformula Open	1:32.718	(Chinese Taipei) Enzo Yeh	Dallara 324	2026 Hockenheim Euroformula Open round
LMP3	1:35.099	(Portugal) Manuel Espírito Santo	Ligier JS P320	2023 Hockenheim Ultimate Cup Series round
Formula Regional	1:35.886	(United Kingdom) Freddie Slater	Tatuus F3 T-318	2025 Hockenheim FREC round
GT3	1:37.529	(Turkey) Ayhancan Güven	Porsche 911 (992 I) GT3 R	2025 Hockenheim DTM round
GT1 (GTS)	1:38.151	(Austria) Karl Wendlinger	Ferrari 575 Maranello GTC	2004 FIA GT Hockenheim 500km
Formula Renault 2.0	1:38.770	(United Kingdom) Max Fewtrell	Tatuus FR2.0/13	2018 Hockenheim Formula Renault Eurocup round
Ferrari Challenge	1:39.111	(Switzerland) Felix Hirsiger	Ferrari 296 Challenge	2025 Hockenheim Ferrari Challenge Europe round
Formula 4	1:40.724	(Brazil) Felipe Drugovich	Tatuus F4-T014	2017 Hockenheim ADAC Formula 4 round
Porsche Carrera Cup	1:40.707	(Netherlands) Flynt Schuring	Porsche 911 (992 II) Cup	2026 Hockenheim Porsche Carrera Cup Germany round
SRO GT2	1:40.785	(Germany) Pierre Kaffer	Audi R8 LMS GT2	2024 Hockenheim GT2 European Series round
N-GT	1:41.406	(Italy) Fabrizio De Simone	Ferrari 360 Modena GTC	2004 FIA GT Hockenheim 500km
GT2	1:41.459	(Italy) Nicola Cadei	Ferrari F430 GTC	2010 Hockenheim GTSprint Series round
Formula Volkswagen	1:42.480	(Germany) Bastian Kolmsee	Reynard Formula Volkswagen	2003 Hockenheim Formula Volkswagen Germany round
ADAC Formel Masters	1:44.722	(United Kingdom) Emil Bernstorff	Dallara Formulino	2011 Hockenheim ADAC Formel Masters round
Formula BMW	1:45.098	(Germany) Marco Holzer	Mygale FB02	2006 1st Hockenheim Formula BMW ADAC Round
Eurocup Mégane Trophy	1:45.491	(Netherlands) Bas Schothorst	Renault Mégane Renault Sport II	2010 Hockenheim Eurocup Mégane Trophy round
GT4	1:47.188	(Germany) Denny Berndt	Porsche 718 Cayman GT4 RS Clubsport	2026 Hockenheim ADAC GT4 Germany round
Formula Renault 1.6	1:48.286	(Belgium) Stoffel Vandoorne	Signatech FR 1.6	2010 Hockenheim F4 Eurocup 1.6 round
TCR Touring Car	1:48.298	(Sweden) Andreas Bäckman	Hyundai i30 N TCR	2019 Hockenheim TCR Europe round
Super 2000	1:49.147	(United Kingdom) Andy Priaulx	BMW 320i	2004 Hockenheim ETCC round
Audi Sport TT Cup	1:49.530	(Italy) Marco Bonanomi	Audi TT Cup	2015 2nd Hockenheim Audi Sport TT Cup round
Alpine Elf Europa Cup	1:49.793	(France) Jean-Baptiste Mela	Alpine A110 Cup	2019 Hockenheim Alpine Elf Europa Cup round
Renault Clio Cup	2:00.126	(France) Alexandre Albouy	Renault Clio R.S. V	2022 Hockenheim Renault Clio Cup Europe round
NXT Gen Cup	2:07.965	(Sweden) Enzo Hallman	LRT NXT1	2024 Hockenheim NXT Gen Cup round
National Circuit (2002–present): 3.736 km (2.321 mi)
Formula Three	1:19.742	(Spain) Daniel Juncadella	Dallara F309	2010 2nd Hockenheim F3 Euro Series round
DTM	1:20.120	(United Kingdom) Paul di Resta	AMG-Mercedes C-Klasse 2009	2010 2nd Hockenheim DTM round
Superbike	1:24.726	(Germany) Florian Alt	Honda CBR1000RR-R	2026 Hockenheim Euro Moto Superbike round
Supersport	1:27.590	(Germany) Dirk Geiger	Yamaha YZF-R9	2026 Hockenheim Euro Moto Supersport round
Porsche Carrera Cup	1:30.426	(Netherlands) Jeroen Bleekemolen	Porsche 911 (997 II) GT3 Cup 3.8	2010 2nd Hockenheim Porsche Carrera Cup Germany round
Sportbike	1:31.441	(Czech Republic) Stepan Zuda	Triumph Daytona 660	2026 Hockenheim Euro Moto Sportbike round
Stock car racing	1:32.160	(Netherlands) Loris Hezemans	Ford Mustang NASCAR	2019 Hockenheim NASCAR Euro Series round
Supersport 300	1:36.928	(Germany) Dirk Geiger	Kawasaki Ninja 400	2022 Hockenheim IDM Supersport 300 round
250cc	1:37.954	(Switzerland) Maxime Schmid	KTM 250 FRR	2023 Hockenheim Northern Talent Cup round
Truck racing	1:51.620	(Germany) Sascha Lenz	MAN TGS	2026 Hockenheim TGP Meisterschaft round
Short Circuit 1 (2002–present): 2.638 km (1.639 mi)
Formula Three	0:56.542	(Germany) Frank Diefenbacher	Dallara F302	2002 1st Hockenheim German F3 round
DTM	0:57.879	(Germany) Christian Abt	Abt-Audi TT-R DTM	2002 1st Hockenheim DTM round
Formula Renault 2.0	1:00.467	(Germany) Bruno Fechner	Tatuus FR2000	2005 Hockenheim Formula Renault 2.0 Germany round
Formula BMW	1:02.456	(Germany) Christian Mamerow	Mygale FB02	2002 1st Hockenheim Formula BMW ADAC Round
V8Star Series	1:04.849	(Portugal) Pedro Lamy	V8Star car	2002 Hockenheim V8Star round
Porsche Carrera Cup	1:15.018	(Germany) Pierre Kaffer	Porsche 911 (996 II) GT3 Cup	2002 1st Hockenheim Porsche Carrera Cup Germany round
Short Circuit 2 (2002–present): 2.604 km (1.618 mi)
Hockenheimring Grand Prix Circuit (1994–2001): 6.823 km (4.240 mi)
Formula One	1:41.808	(Colombia) Juan Pablo Montoya	Williams FW23	2001 German Grand Prix
F3000	1:58.633	(Brazil) Ricardo Rosset	Reynard 95D	1995 Hockenheim F3000 round
GT1 (Prototype)	2:00.333	(Germany) Bernd Schneider	Mercedes-Benz CLK LM	1998 FIA GT Hockenheim 500km
DTM	2:07.288	(Germany) Bernd Mayländer	Mercedes-Benz AMG CLK DTM 2001	2001 2nd Hockenheimring DTM round
GT2	2:07.899	(Portugal) Pedro Lamy	Chrysler Viper GTS-R	1998 FIA GT Hockenheim 500km
Class 1 Touring Cars	2:07.995	(Germany) Manuel Reuter	Opel Calibra V6 4x4	1996 2nd Hockenheim ITC round
Formula Three	2:08.134	(Germany) Markus Winkelhock	Dallara F301	2001 2nd Hockenheim German F3 round
Porsche Carrera Cup	2:17.924	(Germany) Timo Bernhard	Porsche 911 (996 I) GT3 Cup	2000 2nd Hockenheim Porsche Carrera Cup Germany round
Super Touring	2:18.726	(France) Laurent Aïello	Peugeot 406	1997 Hockenheim STW Cup round
Hockenheimring Short Circuit (1966–2001): 2.638 km (1.639 mi)
Formula One	0:57.450	(Austria) Josef Neuhauser	Minardi M190	2001 Hockenheim Interserie round
Formula Three	0:58.472	(Germany) Frank Diefenbacher	Dallara F301	2001 1st Hockenheim German F3 round
Group C	0:59.050	(West Germany) Hans-Joachim Stuck	Porsche 962C	1988 Hockenheim ADAC Supercup round
DTM	1:00.976	(Germany) Bernd Schneider	AMG-Mercedes CLK-DTM 2001	2001 1st Hockenheim DTM round
Class 1 Touring Cars	1:01.417	(Denmark) Jan Magnussen	Mercedes C-Class	1996 1st Hockenheim ITC round
Formula Renault 2.0	1:01.943	(Germany) Marcel Lasée	Tatuus FR2000	2001 Hockenheim Formula Renault 2000 Germany round
GT2	1:03.505	(France) Jean-Philippe Belloc	Chrysler Viper GTS-R	1999 FIA GT Hockenheim 500km
Group 5	1:04.000	(West Germany) Klaus Ludwig	Zakspeed Ford Capri Turbo	1980 Internationaler ADAC Hessen-Cup
Super Touring	1:05.068	(Denmark) Tom Kristensen	Honda Accord	1999 Hockenheim STW Cup round
Formula BMW	1:05.227	(Austria) Richard Lietz	Mygale FB02	2001 1st Hockenheim Formula BMW ADAC Round
Group A	1:05.350	(Germany) Ellen Lohr	Mercedes 190E 2.5-16 Evo2	1992 1st Hockenheimring DTM round
Group 6	1:05.390	(West Germany) Volkert Merl	Porsche 908/3 Turbo	1980 Internationaler ADAC Hessen-Cup
Porsche Carrera Cup	1:06.478	(Germany) Marc Lieb	Porsche 911 (996 I) GT3 Cup	2001 1st Hockenheim Porsche Carrera Cup Germany round
V8Star Series	1:07.112	(Germany) Marcel Tiemann	V8Star car	2001 Hockenheim V8Star round
Formula Volkswagen	1:14.671	(Belgium) Philip Cloostermans	Reynard Formula Volkswagen	2001 Hockenheim Formula Volkswagen Germany round
Group 3	1:24.200	(Switzerland) Heinz Schiller	Porsche 911 S	1967 Hockenheim Grand Touring race
Hockenheimring Grand Prix Circuit (1992–1993): 6.815 km (4.235 mi)
Formula One	1:41.591	(Italy) Riccardo Patrese	Williams FW14B	1992 German Grand Prix
F3000	1:55.381	(Italy) Luca Badoer	Reynard 92D	1992 Hockenheim F3000 round
Class 1 Touring Cars	2:12.180	(Germany) Klaus Ludwig	AMG-Mercedes 190E	1993 2nd Hockenheimring DTM round
Group A	2:13.310	(Germany) Joachim Winkelhock	BMW M3 Sport Evolution	1992 2nd Hockenheimring DTM round
Hockenheimring Grand Prix Circuit (1982–1991): 6.802 km (4.227 mi)
Formula One	1:43.569	(Italy) Riccardo Patrese	Williams FW14	1991 German Grand Prix
IMSA GTP	1:54.710	(United States) John Paul, Jr.	Nissan GTP ZX-T	1991 Rennsport-Festival Hockenheim
F3000	1:56.969	(Italy) Andrea Montermini	Ralt RT23	1991 Hockenheim F3000 round
Group C	1:59.410	(West Germany) Klaus Ludwig	Porsche 956B	1986 Hockenheim ADAC Supercup round
Formula Two	2:01.210	(New Zealand) Mike Thackwell	Ralt RH6/84	1984 1st Hockenheim F2 round
Group A	2:13.350	(Germany) Frank Biela	Audi V8 quattro	1991 2nd Hockenheimring DTM round
Hockenheimring Grand Prix Circuit (1970–1981) & Motorcycling Circuit (1970–2001): 6.790 km (4.219 mi)
Formula One	1:48.490	(Australia) Alan Jones	Williams FW07B	1980 German Grand Prix
Group 7	1:53.300	(United Kingdom) Brian Redman	BRM P167	1971 ADAC-Preis von Baden Württemberg und Hessen in Hockenheim
Formula Two	1:57.090	(Italy) Teo Fabi	March 802	1980 2nd Hockenheim F2 round
Group 5	1:58.390	(France) Bob Wollek	Porsche 935 K3/80	1981 1st Hockenheim DRM round
500cc	1:58.586	(Australia) Mick Doohan	Honda NSR500	1994 German motorcycle Grand Prix
Formula 5000	1:59.600	(Australia) Frank Gardner	Lola T300	1971 Hockenheim F5000 round
World SBK	1:59.885	(Italy) Pierfrancesco Chili	Suzuki GSX-R750	2000 Hockenheim World SBK round
Sports 2000	2:02.100	(France) Jean-Pierre Jabouille	Alpine A441	1974 Int. AvD Preis der Nationen Hockenheim
250cc	2:04.820	(Italy) Loris Capirossi	Honda NSR250	1994 German motorcycle Grand Prix
World SSP	2:06.323	(Germany) Christian Kellner	Yamaha YZF-R6	2000 Hockenheim World SSP round
BMW M1 Procar	2:09.800	(West Germany) Hans-Joachim Stuck	BMW M1 Procar	1980 Hockenheim BMW M1 Procar round
Sidecar (B2A)	2:10.444	(Netherlands) Egbert Streuer	LCR-Yamaha sidecar	1991 German motorcycle Grand Prix
Group 4	2:11.400	(France) Bob Wollek	Porsche 934	1976 3rd Hockenheim DRM round
Group 2	2:14.000	(West Germany) Klaus Ludwig	Ford Capri RS 3100	1975 2nd Hockenheim DRM round
125cc	2:17.301	(Japan) Kazuto Sakata	Honda RS125R	1993 German motorcycle Grand Prix
350cc	2:18.000	(Switzerland) Michel Frutschi	Yamaha TZ 350	1979 German motorcycle Grand Prix
Group 3	2:18.300	(West Germany) Clemens Schickentanz	Porsche Carrera RSR	1974 Int. ADAC-Südwestpokal-Rennen Hockenheim
Formula Renault 2.0	2:19.420	(France) Denis Morin	Martini MK26	1980 Hockenheim French Formula Renault round
50cc	2:46.050	(Switzerland) Stefan Dörflinger	Krauser 80	1983 German motorcycle Grand Prix
Hockenheimring Grand Prix Circuit (1966–1970): 6.769 km (4.206 mi)
Formula 5000	1:54.600	(United Kingdom) Trevor Taylor	Surtees TS5	1969 Hockenheim F5000 round
Group 6	1:57.800	(United Kingdom) David Piper	Ferrari 412P	1968 Internationales Solitude-Rennen auf dem Hockenheimring
Formula Two	1:58.700	(Austria) Dieter Quester	BMW 269	1970 Jim Clark-Rennen/Deutschland Trophäe
250cc	2:04.500	(East Germany) Heinz Rosner	MZ RZ 250 Twin	1969 German motorcycle Grand Prix
500cc	2:09.100	(Italy) Giacomo Agostini	MV Agusta 500 Three	1967 German motorcycle Grand Prix
Group 4	2:10.400	(West Germany) Udo Schütz	Porsche 906	1966 100 Meilen von Hockenheim
350cc	2:14.900	(Italy) Giacomo Agostini	MV Agusta 350 3C	1969 German motorcycle Grand Prix
Group 3	2:20.200	(West Germany) Peter Kaiser	Porsche 911T	1969 Intern. Solitude-Rennen auf dem Hockenheimring
125cc	2:22.100	(United Kingdom) Bill Ivy	Yamaha AS1	1967 German motorcycle Grand Prix
Group 2	2:26.300	(West Germany) Siegfried Dau	Porsche 911	1967 MHSTC/AvD 100 Meilen von Hockenheim
50cc	2:55.900	(Netherlands) Aalt Toersen	Kreidler 50 Van Veen	1969 German motorcycle Grand Prix
Kurpfalzring (1938–1965): 7.692 km (4.780 mi)
500cc	2:13.300	(United Kingdom) Bob McIntyre	Gilera Saturno	1957 German motorcycle Grand Prix
250cc	2:26.700	(Japan) Kunimitsu Takahashi	Honda RC162	1963 German motorcycle Grand Prix
Group 3	2:31.400	(West Germany) Peter Nöcker	Ferrari 250 GT	1962 Hockenheim Grand Touring race
350cc	2:31.600	(Czech Republic) František Šťastný	Jawa 350	1963 German motorcycle Grand Prix
Sports car	2:33.926	(West Germany) Richard von Frankenberg	Porsche 550	1955 Hockenheim Sports Car race
125cc	2:40.900	(West Germany) Ernst Degner	Suzuki 125 V4	1963 German motorcycle Grand Prix
Formula Two	2:46.700	(West Germany) Egon Brütsch	EBS-Maserati Westenrieder	1949 Maipokalrennen
Formula Junior	3:02.600	(West Germany) Kurt Ahrens Sr.	Cooper T52	1960 Rhein-Pokalrennen

== Motorsport events ==
=== Current events ===
- 27–29 March: DMV Goodyear Racing Days
- 17–19 April: Preis der Stadt Stuttgart
- 1–3 May: Porsche Sports Cup Deutschland ADAC Racing Weekend Hockenheim
- 8–10 May: BOSS GP Hockenheim Historic
- 21–23 August: European Drag Racing Championship NitrolympX
- 11–13 September: International GT Open, Formula Regional European Championship, Euroformula Open Championship, Porsche Carrera Cup Benelux, Supercar Challenge
- 18–20 September: Hockenheim Classics
- 25–27 September: IDM Superbike Championship
- 2–4 October: Porsche Sports Cup Deutschland ADAC Racing Weekend Hockenheim
- 9–11 October: Deutsche Tourenwagen Masters, ADAC GT Masters, ADAC GT4 Germany, Porsche Carrera Cup Germany
- 22–25 October: DMV 1000km Hockenheim

=== Future events ===
- Eurocup-3 (2027)
- F4 Germany Championship (2015–2022, 2027)
- Ferrari Challenge Europe (2000, 2005, 2007, 2010, 2013, 2016, 2022, 2025, 2027)

=== Former events ===
- 24H Series
  - 12 Hours of Hockenheimring (2020–2022)
- ADAC Formel Masters (2008–2014)
- ADAC TCR Germany Touring Car Championship (2016–2022)
- Alpine Elf Europa Cup (2019)
- Audi Sport TT Cup (2015–2017)
- BMW M1 Procar Championship (1979–1980)
- Drift Masters (2017–2018)
- Eurocup Mégane Trophy (2010)
- European Formula 5000 Championship (1969–1971)
- European Formula Two Championship (1967–1984)
- European Touring Car Championship (1986, 2004)
- EuroV8 Series (2014)
- F4 Eurocup 1.6 (2010)
- FIA Formula 3 European Championship (2011–2018)
- FIA GT Championship (1997–1999, 2004)
- FIA World Rallycross Championship
  - World RX of Hockenheim (2015–2017)
- FIM Endurance World Championship (1986)
- Formula 3 Euro Series (2003–2012)
- Formula 750 (1973, 1975–1979)
- Formula BMW ADAC (2000–2007)
- Formula BMW Europe (2008, 2010)
- Formula One
  - German Grand Prix (1970, 1977–1984, 1986–2006, 2008, 2010, 2012, 2014, 2016, 2018–2019)
- Formula Renault 2.0 Germany (1998–1999, 2001–2003, 2005)
- Formula Renault 3.5 Series (2010)
- Formula Renault Eurocup (1995–1998, 2004, 2010, 2018–2020)
- Formula Renault 2.0 Middle European Championship (2004–2008, 2010)
- Formula Renault Northern European Cup (2007–2018)
- Formula Volkswagen Germany (2001, 2003)
- French Formula Renault Championship (1978, 1980)
- Grand Prix motorcycle racing
  - Baden-Württemberg motorcycle Grand Prix (1986)
  - German motorcycle Grand Prix (1957, 1959, 1961, 1966–1967, 1969, 1971, 1973, 1975, 1977, 1979, 1981–1983, 1985, 1987, 1989, 1991–1994)
- GP2 Series (2005-2006, 2008, 2010, 2012, 2014, 2016)
- GP3 Series (2010, 2012, 2014, 2016)
- GT Cup Open Europe (2024–2025)
- GT World Challenge Europe (2022–2024)
- GT2 European Series (2021, 2024)
- GT4 European Series (2022–2024)
- International Formula 3000 (1990–2004)
- Italian Formula Renault Championship (2004, 2006)
- Lamborghini Super Trofeo Europe (2010–2011)
- NASCAR Whelen Euro Series (2017–2019)
- Northern Talent Cup (2020, 2023)
- Porsche Supercup (1993–2006, 2008, 2010, 2012, 2014, 2016, 2018–2019)
- Prototype Cup Germany (2022–2025)
- Renault Clio Cup Europe (2021–2022, 2024)
- Sidecar World Championship (1957, 1959, 1961, 1963, 1966–1969, 1971, 1973, 1975, 1977, 1979, 1981–1983, 1985–1987, 1989, 1991–1994, 1999–2000)
- Superbike World Championship (1988–1997, 1999–2000)
- Supersport World Championship (1997, 1999–2000)
- Superstars GTSprint Series (2010)
- Superstars Series (2010–2011)
- TCR Europe Touring Car Series (2016, 2019, 2025)
- TCR International Series (2016)
- Trofeo Maserati (2004)
- Ultimate Cup Series (2022–2024)
- V8Star Series (2001–2002)
- W Series (2019)
- World Sportscar Championship (1966–1967, 1977, 1985)

== Music events ==
- Michael Jackson
  - Bad World Tour – 10 July 1988
  - HIStory World Tour – 10 August 1997
- Tina Turner – Foreign Affair: The Farewell Tour – 26 August 1990
- Pink Floyd – The Division Bell Tour – 13 August 1994
- The Rolling Stones
  - Voodoo Lounge Tour – 19 August 1995
  - Licks Tour and 22 June 2003 with AC/DC
- AC/DC
  - Stiff Upper Lip World Tour, with Buddy Guy, Die Toten Hosen & Megadeth – 10 June 2001
  - Black Ice World Tour – 22 May 2009
  - Rock or Bust World Tour – 16 May 2015
  - Power Up Tour – 13 July 2024
- Robbie Williams – Close Encounters Tour – 12–13 August 2006
- Sonisphere Festival, headlined by Metallica – 2009
- Hardwell - 2016
- Ed Sheeran – ÷ Tour – 22–23 June 2019
- Bruce Springsteen and the E Street Band – Springsteen and E Street Band 2023 Tour – 21 July 2023

== Fatal accidents ==
- 1968 Jim Clark, during a Formula 2 race
- 1972 Bert Hawthorne, during a Formula 2 race
- 1980 Markus Höttinger, during a Formula 2 race
- 1980 Patrick Depailler, during a private test session
- 1986 Tony Boden, during a drag racing meeting
- 2014 Albert Fleming, during the Bosch Hockenheim Historic
