= Ralf Druckenmüller =

German racing driver

- Born: April 6, 1970 (age 56)
- Occupation: car racing

Ralf Druckenmüller, (Born April 6, 1970) in Mendig, is a German racing driver competing in single-seaters, touring cars, and trucks.

== Career ==
Druckenmüller's motorsport career spanned from 1989 to 2005.

Druckenmüller began his career in karting from 1985 to 1988, subsequently securing three national titles: German Formula Ford 1600 Champion (in 1990, with three victories), Formula Renault Champion (in 1995—achieving 6 victories driving an Ermolli FR95 chassis—following a total of five seasons in the series, which also saw him finish fourth and third in the championship standings in 1992 and 1993, respectively), and winner of the Renault Clio V6 Cup (in 2000, with five victories). In 2001 and 2002, he competed in nearly twenty races in the V8Star Series; then, during the 2004 and 2005 seasons, he shifted his focus to the European Truck Racing Championship as a member of the Deutsche Post World Net Truck Volkswagen Commercial Vehicles team. He went on to claim the continental Super-Race-Trucks title in 2005, and competing in a race driving in a MAN racing truck, following a final victory in the season's concluding round, held at Le Mans.
