= V8Star Series =

Touring car racing series based in Germany

V8 S.T.A.R. Series
- Category: Touring cars
- Country: Germany
- Inaugural season: 2001
- Folded: 2003
- Engine suppliers: Roush FR Boss 351W 5.7l V8
- Tyre suppliers: Goodyear
- Last Drivers' champion: (Portugal) Pedro Lamy
- Last Teams' champion: (Germany) Zakspeed Racing

The V8Star Series (actually: V8 S.T.A.R. for Silhouette Touring Automobile Racing) was a touring car racing series based in Germany that ran for three seasons between 2001 and 2003.

The series featured privateers racing identical cars that were covered in different silhouette designs to create visual diversity. It was commonly compared to the Deutsche Tourenwagen Masters, which was factory-backed and revived in 2000. Its choice of engines and the fact that it raced twice in the oval configuration at the EuroSpeedway Lausitz also led to the V8Star Series being called the "German NASCAR" before its cancellation in November 2003 due to a lack of sponsorship money.

== Cars ==
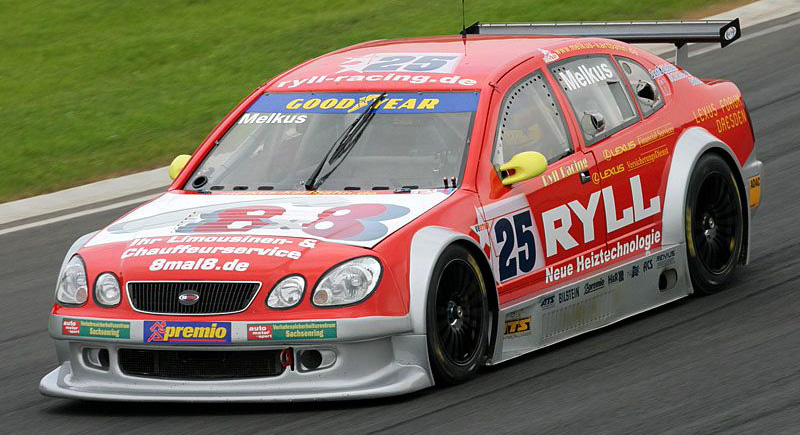
A V8Star Series car with the silhouette resembling a Lexus GS

All the cars in the V8Star Series used the same technology and were only differentiated visually by featuring a variety of silhouettes. They were powered by a 5.7-litre V8 engine with two valves per cylinder that was developed by Roush, an American company with connections to NASCAR. The primary goal was to keep the costs as low as possible, which included developing an engine that would last an entire season. Since the teams were only able to lease these engines and had no option of buying them, the leasing contract had to guarantee them a new engine if the original one had failed during a race. The engines were lightweight aluminium block units weighing about 200 kg each. During the 2001 season, they produced 450 hp of power, but they were tuned up to 495 hp at 6,500 rpm and 600 Nm at 4,850 rpm before the beginning of the 2002 season. The power was transferred via a 6-speed sequential gearbox that was developed by Australian company Holinger, which had previously created it for use in the V8 Supercars series. The teams were not allowed to modify engines and gearboxes in any way.

The chassis was a mono type tubular chrome-molybdenum steel chassis and the entire car weighed 1,295 kg, of which 90 kg was a fibreglass-reinforced plastic silhouette. The cars had independent, double wishbone suspension in front and rear. Wheels were 18 inches in diameter. Slick Goodyear control tyres were 12 inches wide in front and 14 inches in rear. Each car was 1.92 m wide and 1.36 m high. Rear wings, rear diffusers and front spoilers were adjusted in wind tunnel in order to make each body style equal. The chassis and approximately 40 percent of components on each car were developed by Nitec, a subdivision of Zakspeed, and the company was also responsible for assembling the cars.

The silhouettes were modelled to visually resemble a total of seven production cars that were sold in Germany at the time, including the designs of Audi A6, BMW 5 Series, Ford Mondeo, Jaguar S-Type, Lexus GS, Opel Omega and Volkswagen Passat. As none of the manufacturers were involved in the V8Star Series, the silhouettes were unbranded. The Audi and BMW silhouettes had to be heavily modified after protests from the two companies, and a Mercedes-Benz silhouette was never used for fears of copyright claims. Other brands saw the V8Star Series as an opportunity for advertising their designs free of charge. Ford and Volkswagen expressed their approval of the series, with the Mondeo and Passat silhouettes introduced for the 2002 season and requiring no modifications. The Opel Omega silhouette was primarily used by the team run by Irmscher, a tuning company that had run an Opel Astra in the DTM in 2000.

== Comparisons with the DTM ==
The V8Star Series began shortly after the revival of Germany's premier touring car racing series, the DTM. The cars were built in a similar way. Both series used prototypes that had no technical similarities to a production car, were powered by a V8 engine and covered in a silhouette that was modelled to visually resemble some of the production cars that were sold in Germany at the time.

The V8Star Series used the same type of chassis for each car to keep the costs low, which was similar to the DTM using the same type of parts for each car to achieve the same goal. Furthermore, the silhouettes were made of fibreglass, rather than the more expensive carbon fibre, and the engines were leased, rather than sold, to the teams. The goal of keeping the costs low was highly important for the V8Star Series due to the fact that it only featured privateer teams that were not supported by car manufacturers.

A V8Star Series car weighted approximately 300 kg more than a DTM car, but it was also powered by a more powerful engine. The V8Star Series used silhouettes that resembled mid-sized and executive sedans in order to differentiate itself from the DTM visually as well, since the DTM at the time used silhouettes that were modelled after coupes.

The V8Star Series representatives did not want it to be seen as a competitor for the DTM, but rather a second division of German touring car racing, with the DTM keeping its status as the top level. The lack of involvement from car manufacturers in the V8Star Series meant that it primarily competed with the DTM in hiring better engineers and drivers, as well as in attracting more sponsors. Some car manufacturers, particularly Mercedes-Benz, allegedly prevented their engineers from co-operating with the V8Star Series, and the DTM representatives reportedly saw the V8Star Series as a competitor as well, even attempting to discredit it.

== Race venues ==
Over the three years, the V8Star Series ran a total of 29 races that were held at eight different circuits, five in Germany and three in the neighbouring countries.

The primary venues were the Nürburgring, which hosted a total of nine races, and the EuroSpeedway Lausitz, which hosted a total of eight races. The Nürburgring hosted three races during each season, whilst the EuroSpeedway Lausitz hosted two races per season in 2001 and 2002 in the venue's Grand Prix configuration. In 2003, the EuroSpeedway Lausitz hosted four races, of which three were in the venue's oval configuration. The first oval race was annulled due to several timekeeping and supervising errors, which led to it being re-run the day before the second scheduled one. The Motorsport Arena Oschersleben hosted two races per season in 2001 and 2002, with the Hockenheimring hosting one race per season during the same time. Both tracks were dropped from the 2003 calendar, which featured the Sachsenring as a new venue for a single race.

Five of the 29 races were held outside of Germany. The first such race took place at the Salzburgring in Austria during the first season in 2001. The series featured two non-German venues in 2002 by returning to the Salzburgring and visiting the Circuit Zolder in Belgium, with both tracks hosting one race each. For the final season in 2003, the two venues were dropped and the series hosted two races at the Circuit Park Zandvoort in the Netherlands instead.

== Scoring system ==
- Below is the scoring system used in the inaugural 2001 season:

| Position | 1st | 2nd | 3rd | 4th | 5th | 6th | 7th | 8th | 9th | 10th | 11th | 12th | 13th | 14th | 15th | 16th | 17th | 18th | 19th | 20th | 21st | 22nd | 23rd | 24th |
| Points | 26 | 24 | 23 | 22 | 21 | 20 | 19 | 18 | 17 | 16 | 15 | 14 | 13 | 12 | 11 | 10 | 9 | 8 | 7 | 6 | 5 | 4 | 3 | 2 |

- For 2002 and 2003, points were awarded to the top thirty race finishers with no bonus points for pole position or the fastest race lap.

| Position | 1st | 2nd | 3rd | 4th | 5th | 6th | 7th | 8th | 9th | 10th | 11th | 12th | 13th | 14th | 15th | 16th | 17th | 18th | 19th | 20th | 21st | 22nd | 23rd | 24th | 25th | 26th | 27th | 28th | 29th | 30th |
| Points | 32 | 30 | 29 | 28 | 27 | 26 | 25 | 24 | 23 | 22 | 21 | 20 | 19 | 18 | 17 | 16 | 15 | 14 | 13 | 12 | 11 | 10 | 9 | 8 | 7 | 6 | 5 | 4 | 3 | 2 |

== Champions ==
| Season | Champion | Team Champion |
|---|---|---|
| 2001 | (Venezuela) Johnny Cecotto (Irmscher Motorsport) | (France) PoleVision Racing |
| 2002 | (Venezuela) Johnny Cecotto (Irmscher Motorsport) | (Germany) Zakspeed Motorsport |
| 2003 | (Portugal) Pedro Lamy (Zakspeed Racing) | (Germany) Zakspeed Racing |

== In popular culture ==
- Some of the cars from the series were featured in the music video for the song "First Day of My Life" by The Rasmus. The music video was filmed at the EuroSpeedway Lausitz.

== See also ==
- Deutsche Tourenwagen Masters
- Deutsche Tourenwagen Meisterschaft
- ADAC Procar Series
