= Irmscher =

German automotive aftermarket company

Irmscher Automobilbau GmbH & Co KG

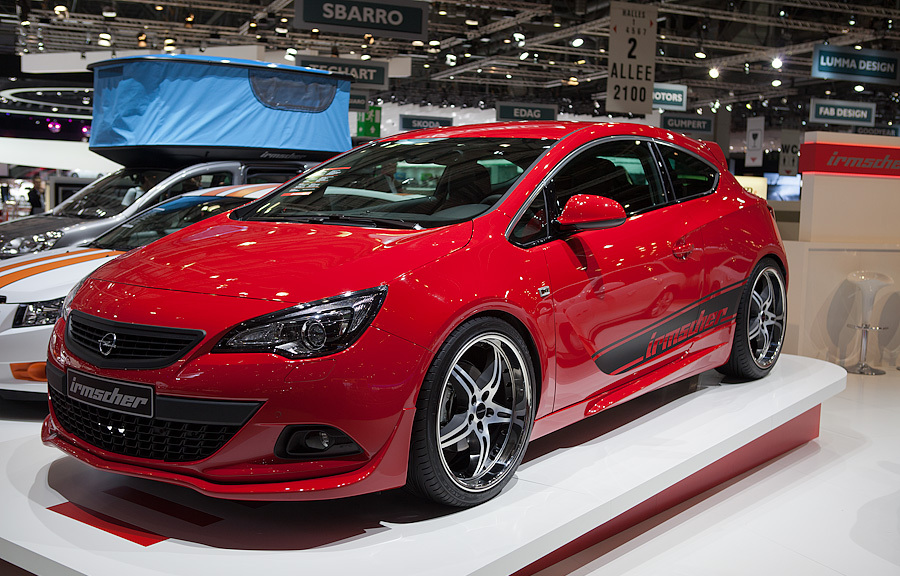
- 2012 Opel Astra (J) GTC (Irmscher enhanced)
- Type: GmbH & Co KG
- Industry: Automotive
- Founded: 1968; 58 years ago
- Founder: Günther Irmscher Sr.
- Headquarters: Remshalden, Germany
- Key people: Günther Irmscher, CEO
- Products: Cars
- Number of employees: 150
- Website: irmscher.com

Irmscher Automobilbau GmbH & Co. KG is a German car tuning and manufacturing company, specialising in Opel, Peugeot and Kia vehicles as well as working for the automotive industry as an engineering service provider.

It was founded in 1968 in a double garage in the Swabian town of Winnenden (near Stuttgart) by rally driver and mechanic Günther Irmscher.

Irmscher has retained close links to the Opel company by operating the factory team in many European and German automobile competitions, including the Ascona B i400 rally car, the Vectra touring car, the Astra DTM car and the Omega V8Star Series car.

This has led them to design and manufacture parts for Chevrolet, the Cadillac CTS and wheels for the GM based SAAB models, although these are much rarer than the Opel parts. Their distinctive customised parts include alloy wheels, bodykits and exhausts as well as various interior fittings.

== Vehicles ==
=== Irmscher Roadster (1993-2012) ===
Since 1993, Irmscher has been building their own replica of the Lotus Seven. Initially, the vehicle bore the model name Seventy Seven (1993-2004). Towards its latter years it was known as the Irmscher 7 (2004-2012). Power comes from Opel-sourced four-cylinder units. Choices include: 115 hp or 150 hp (NA-spec); 240 hp or 284 hp (Turbo).

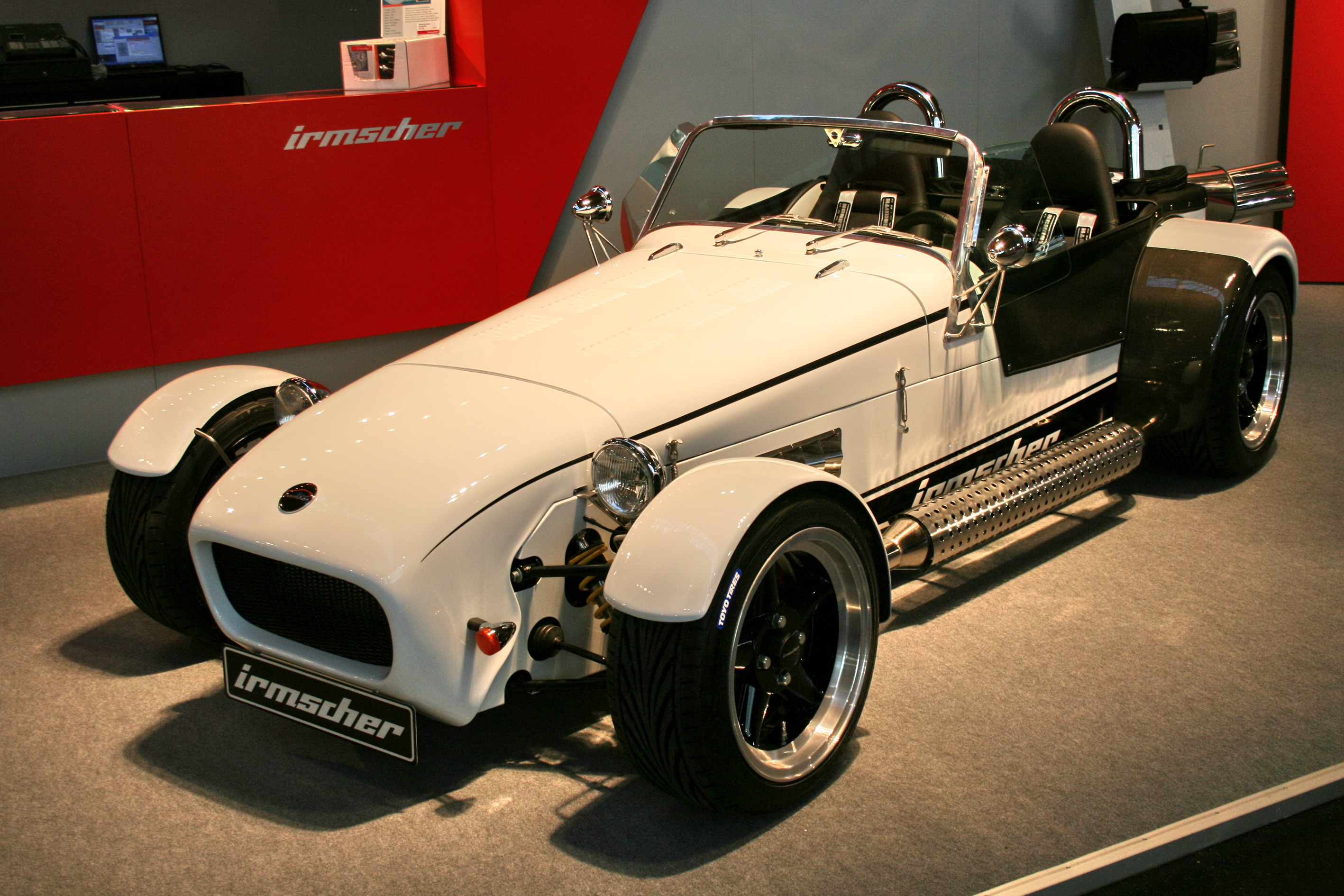
Irmscher 7

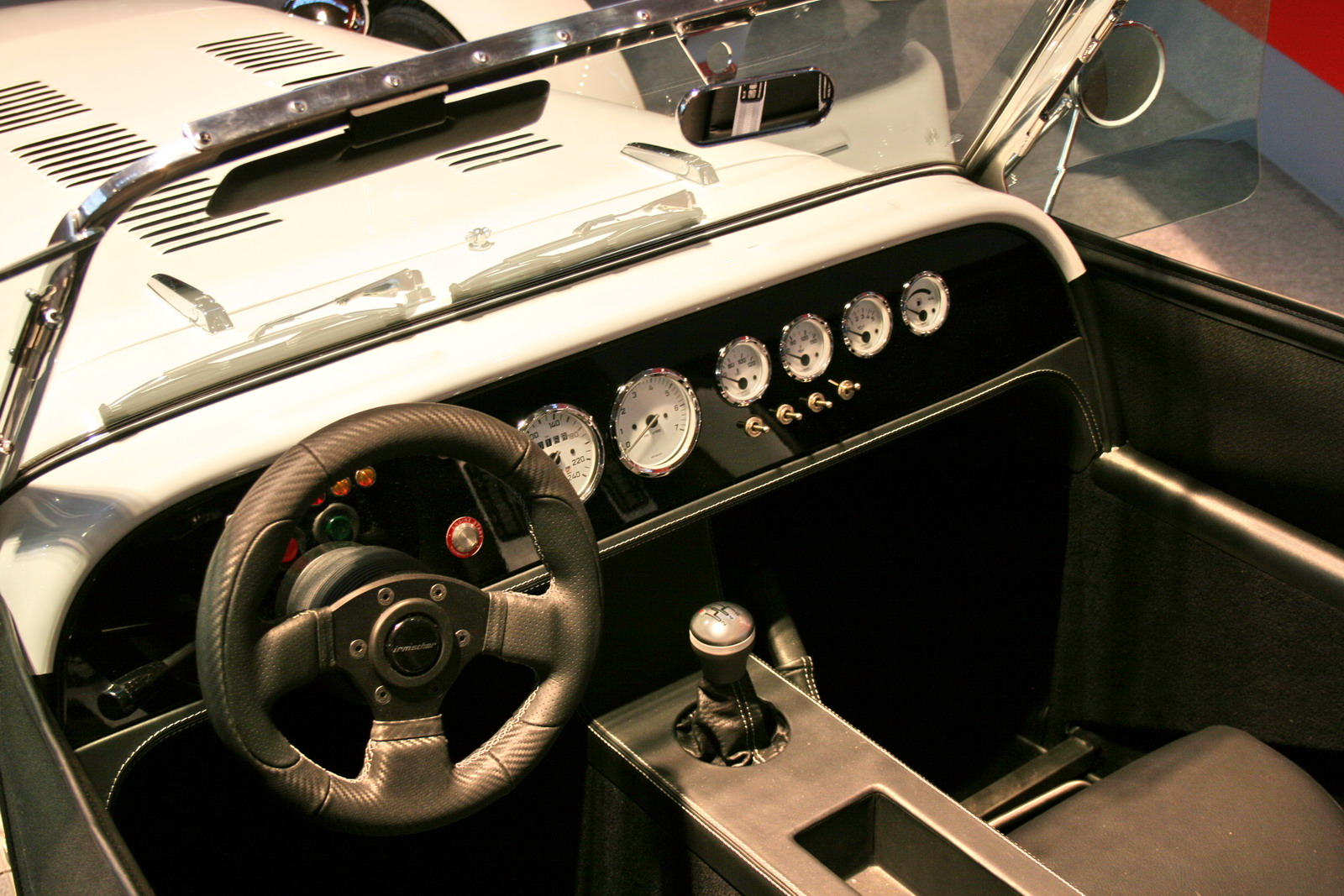
Irmscher 7 Cockpit

=== Other vehicles produced by Irmscher ===
- In 1989, Irmscher introduced the Irmscher GT, equipped with a 3.6L I-6 engine and marketed it as a 2+2 seater sports coupe.
- In 1989, Irmscher collaborated with Isuzu to produce the Isuzu Trooper Bighorn model in Irmscher-S and Irmscher-R trims. The modifications only limited to cosmetic changes.
- In 2002, the company presented the Inspiro concept at the Geneva Motor Show. The roadster was fitted with a fettled X30XE 3.0L V6 from the Opel Omega B.
- In 2008, commemorating Irmscher's 40th anniversary, the Opel GT/Saturn Sky based GT i40 was introduced with a 6.0L V8 engine.
- In 2011, a purely electrically operated variant of the Irmscher Roadster named Irmscher 7 Selectra was presented at the Geneva Motor Show.

== Gallery ==
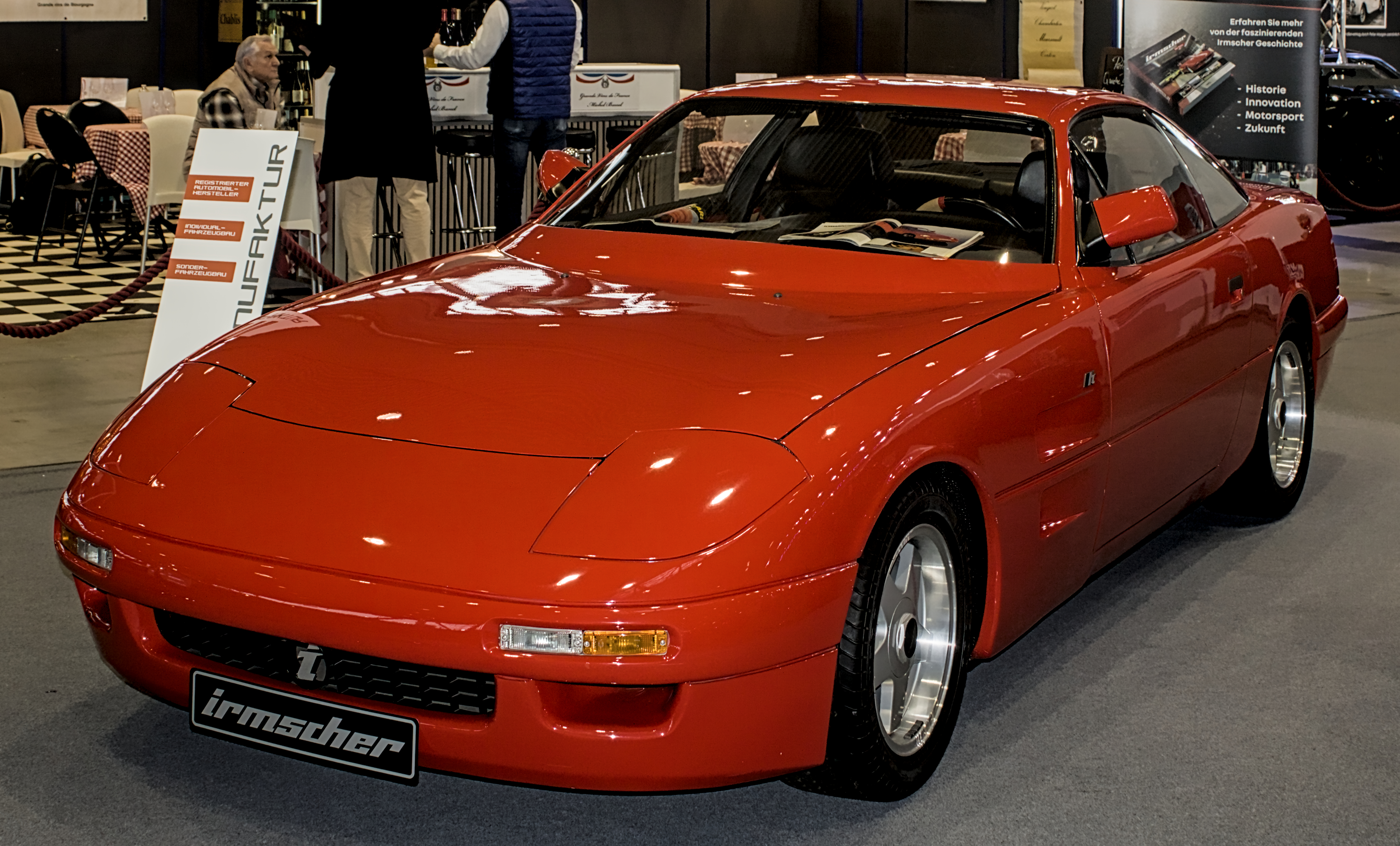
Irmscher GT

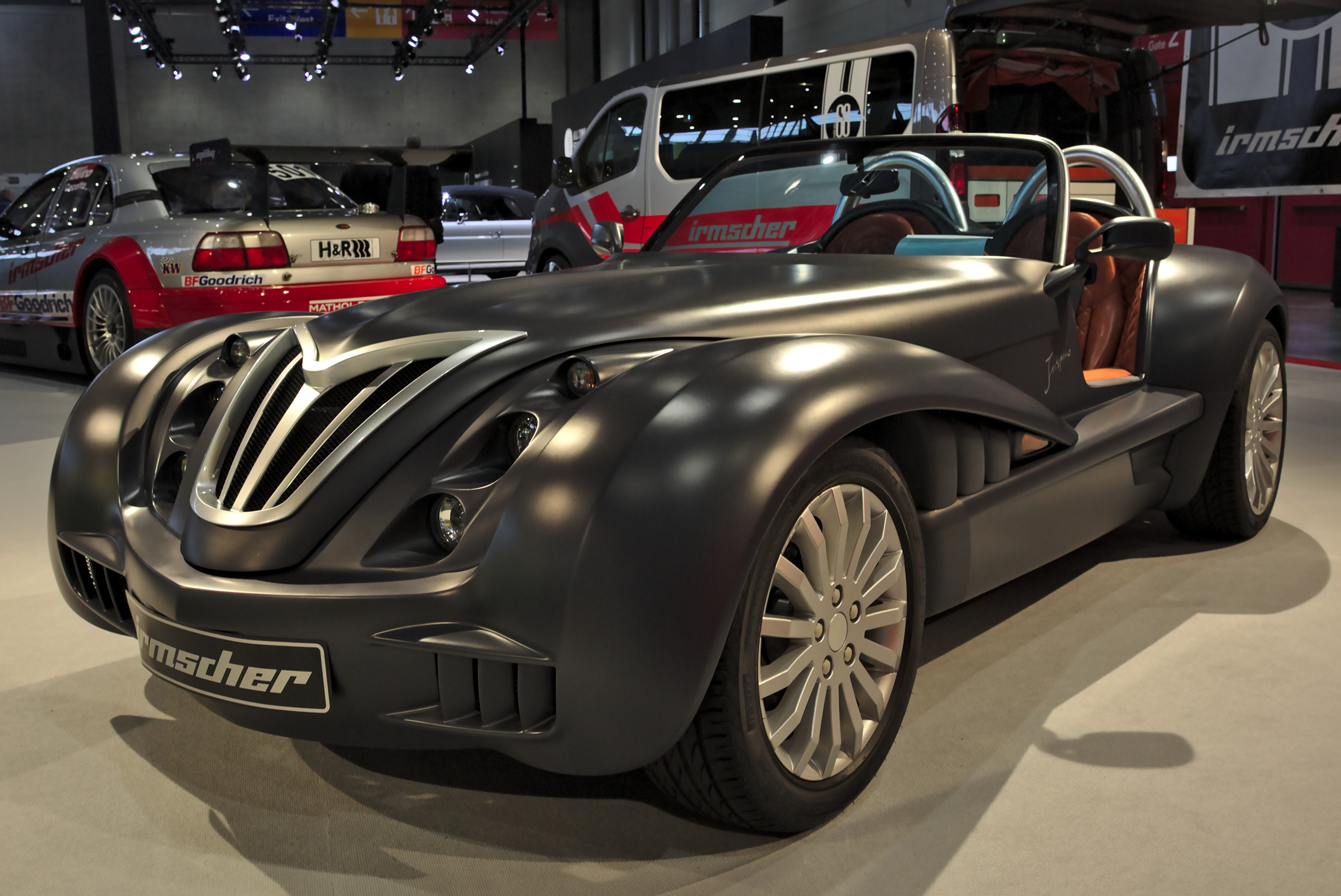
Irmscher Inspiro

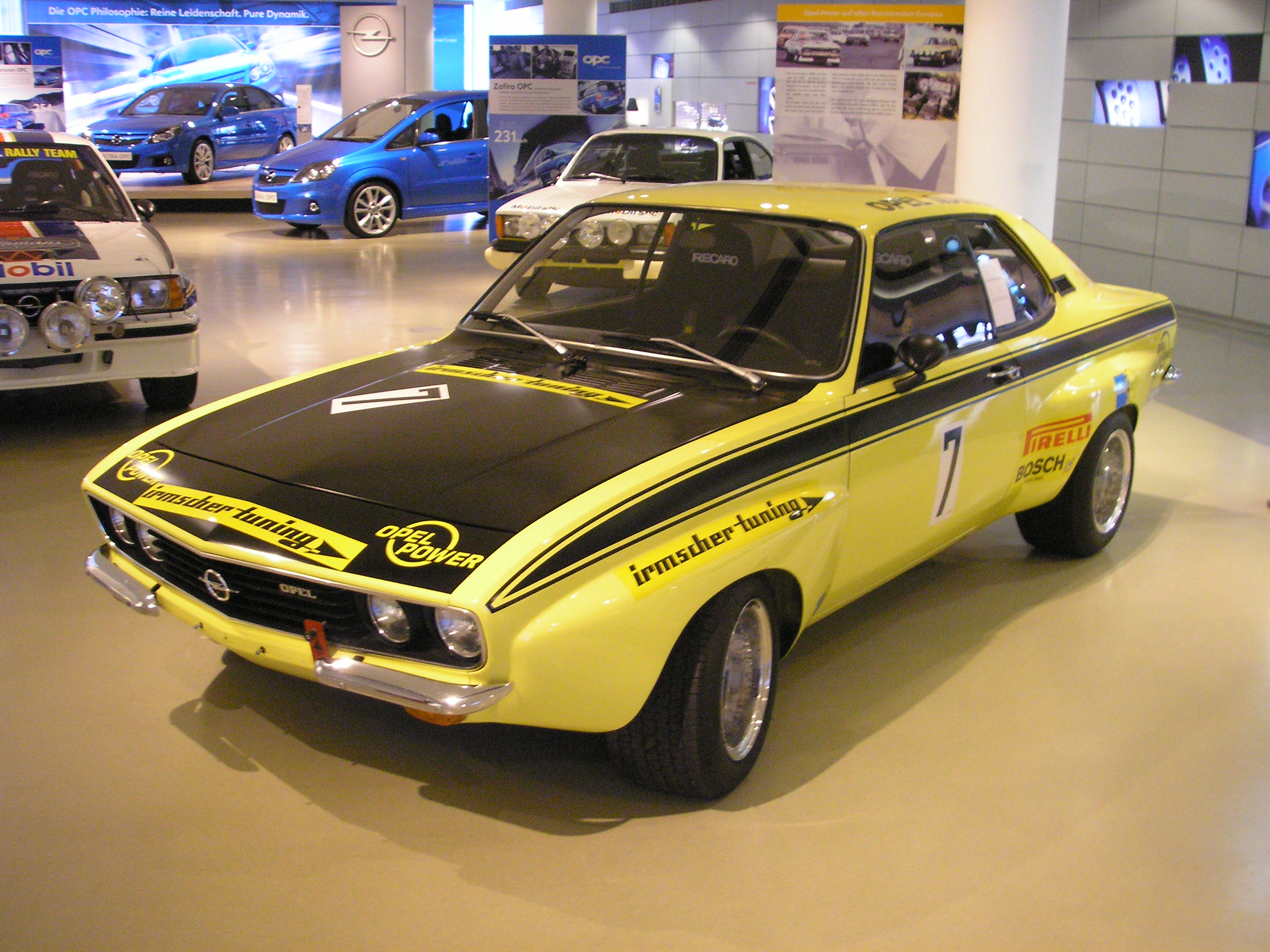
Opel Manta A
(Irmscher tuned)

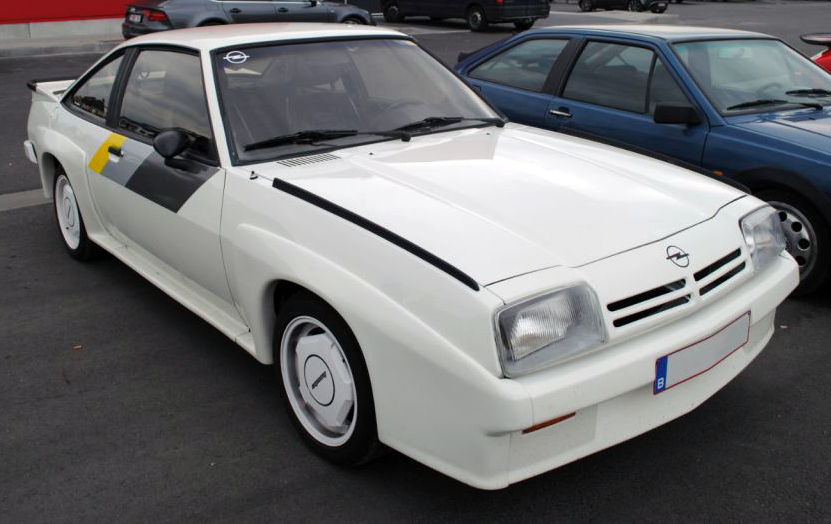
Irmscher i240 Dakar
(Based on Opel Manta B)

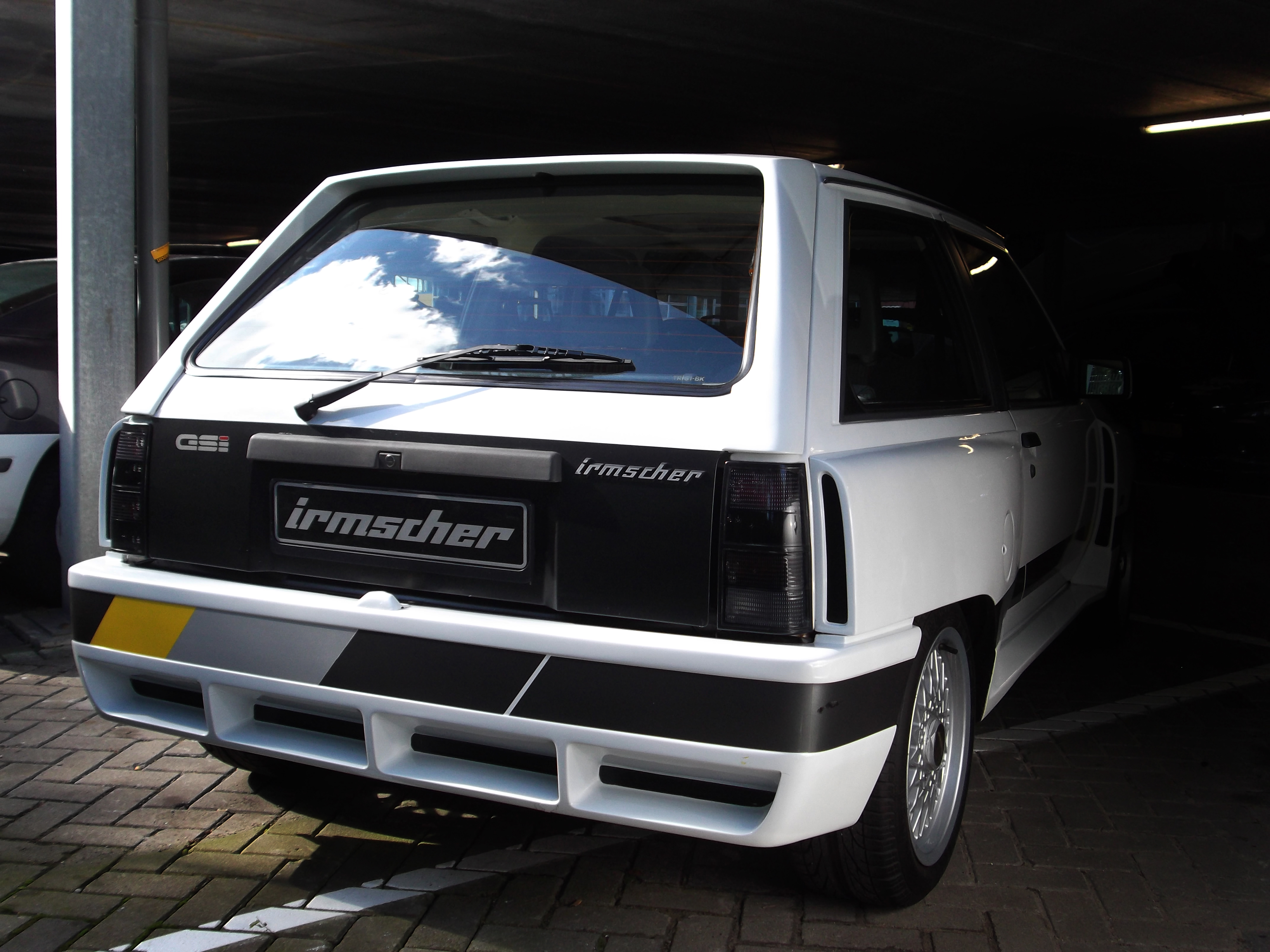
Opel Corsa A GSi
(Irmscher tuned)

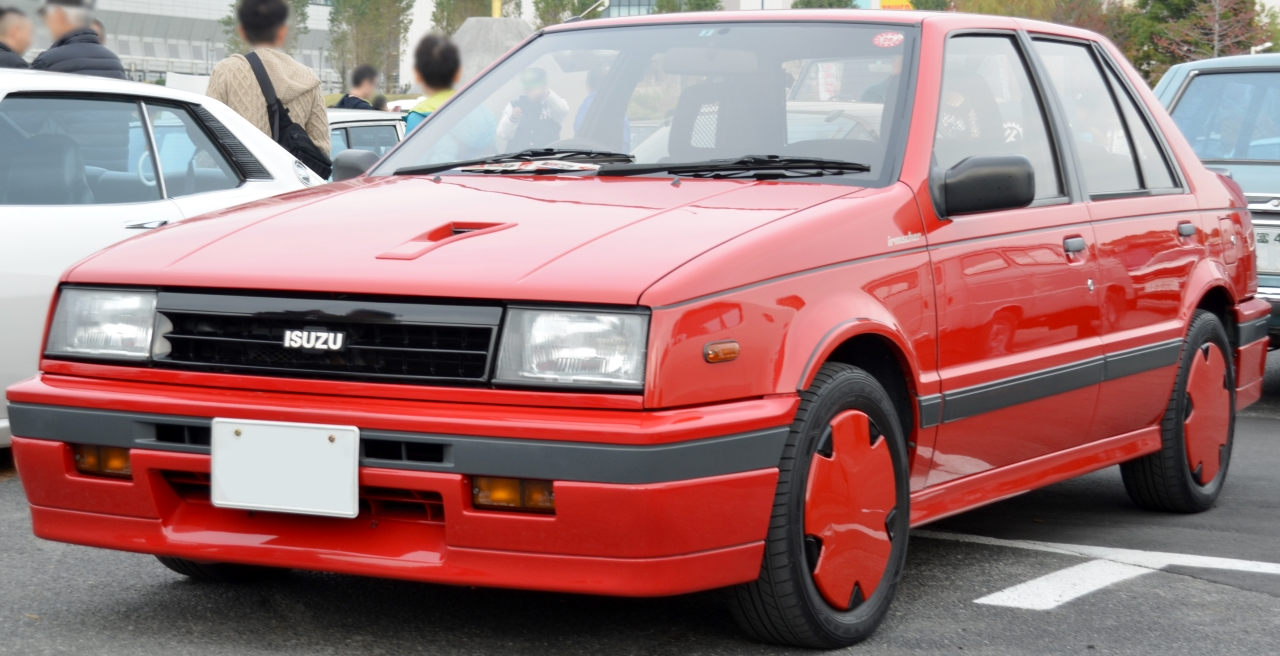
Isuzu Gemini Irmscher

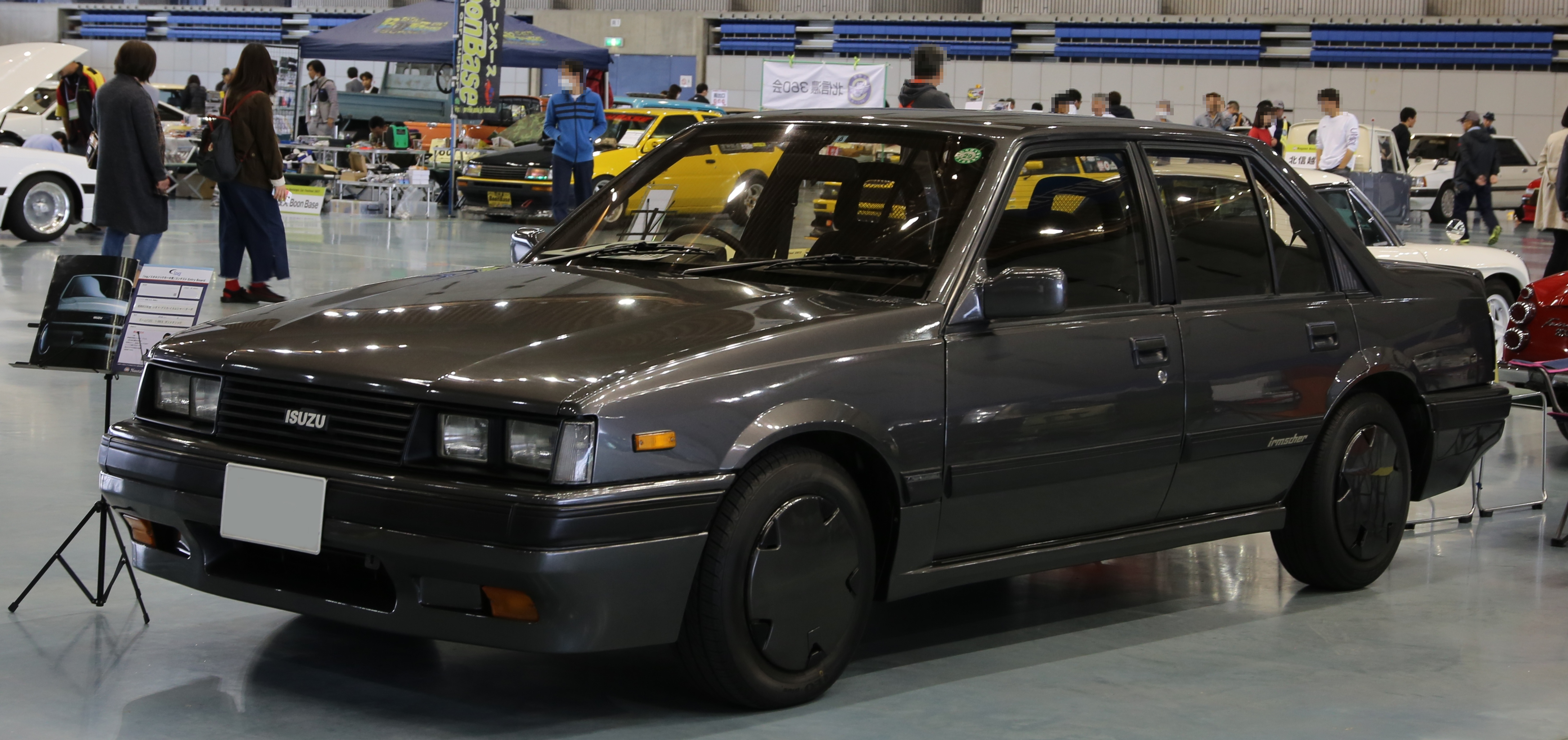
Isuzu Aska Irmscher Turbo

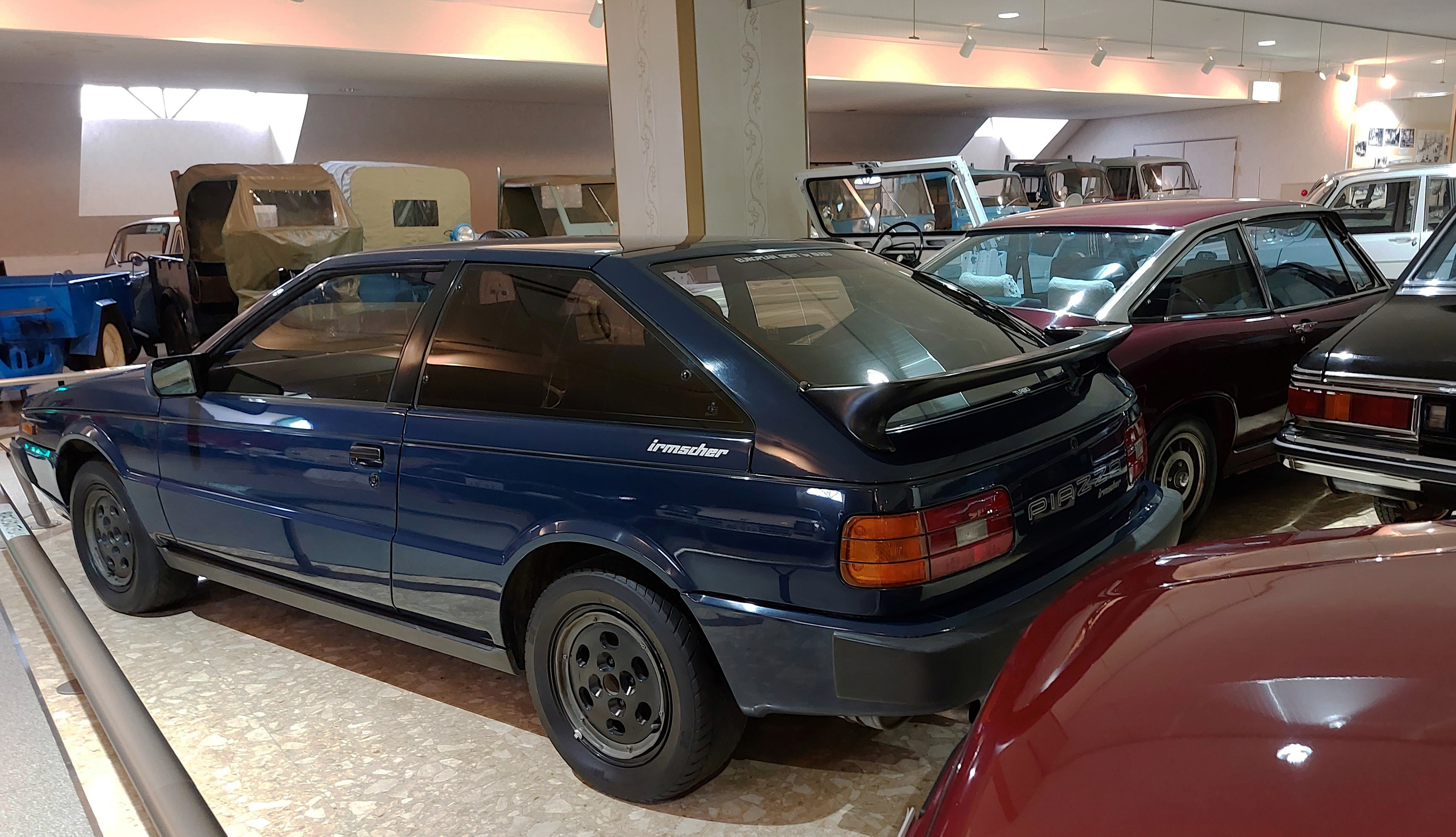
Isuzu Piazza Irmscher

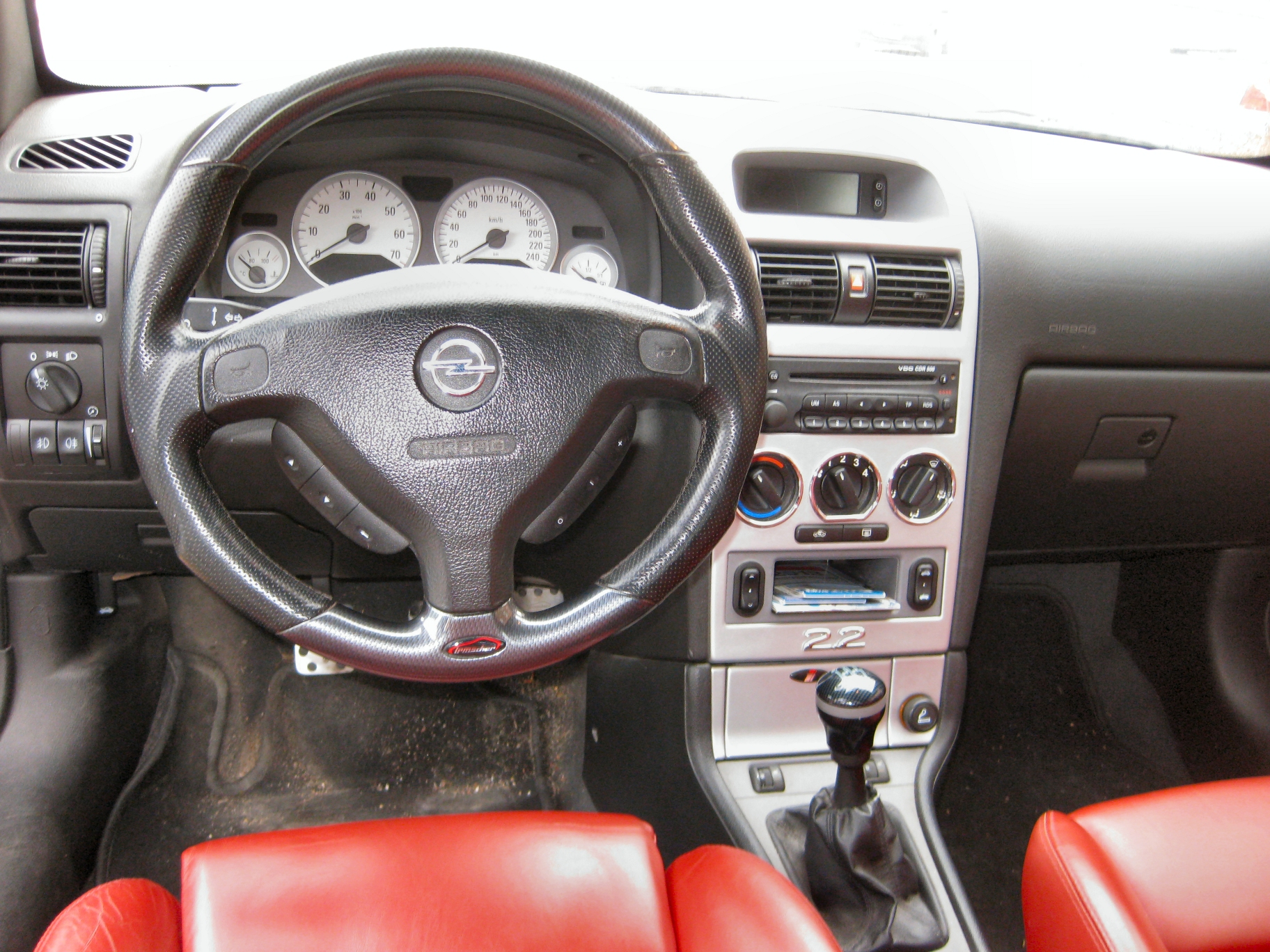
Opel Astra G Cabrio Cockpit

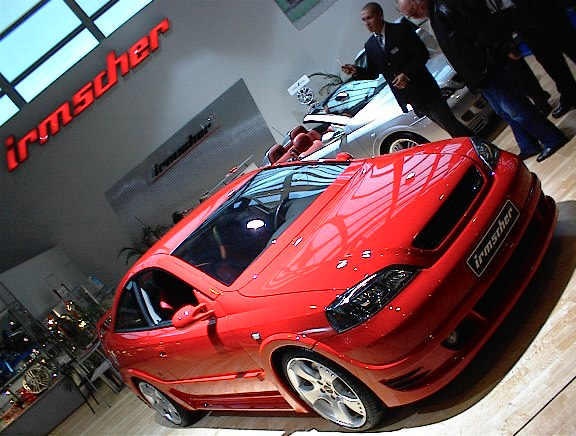
Irmscher Opel Astra G

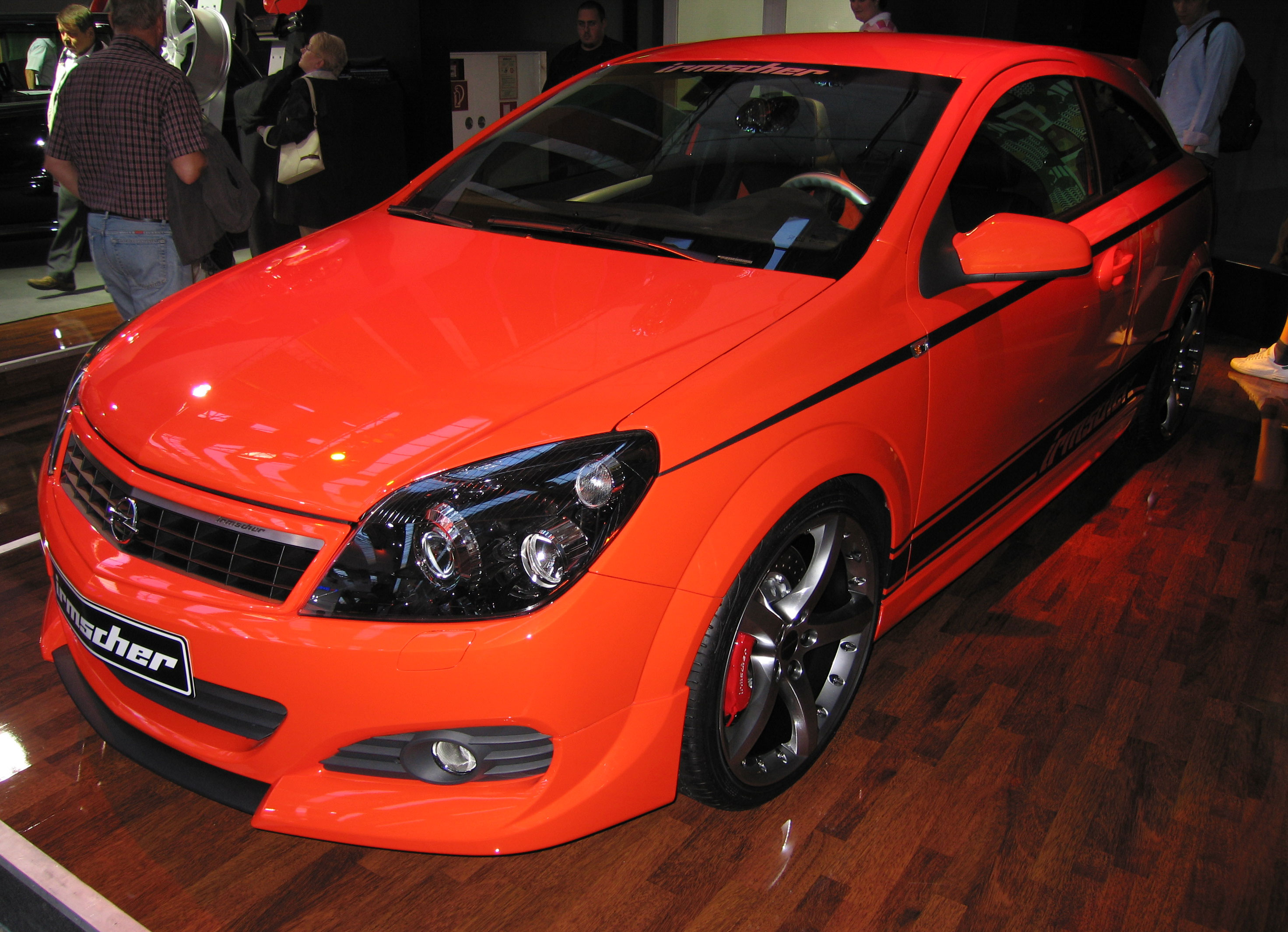
Irmscher Opel Astra H GTC

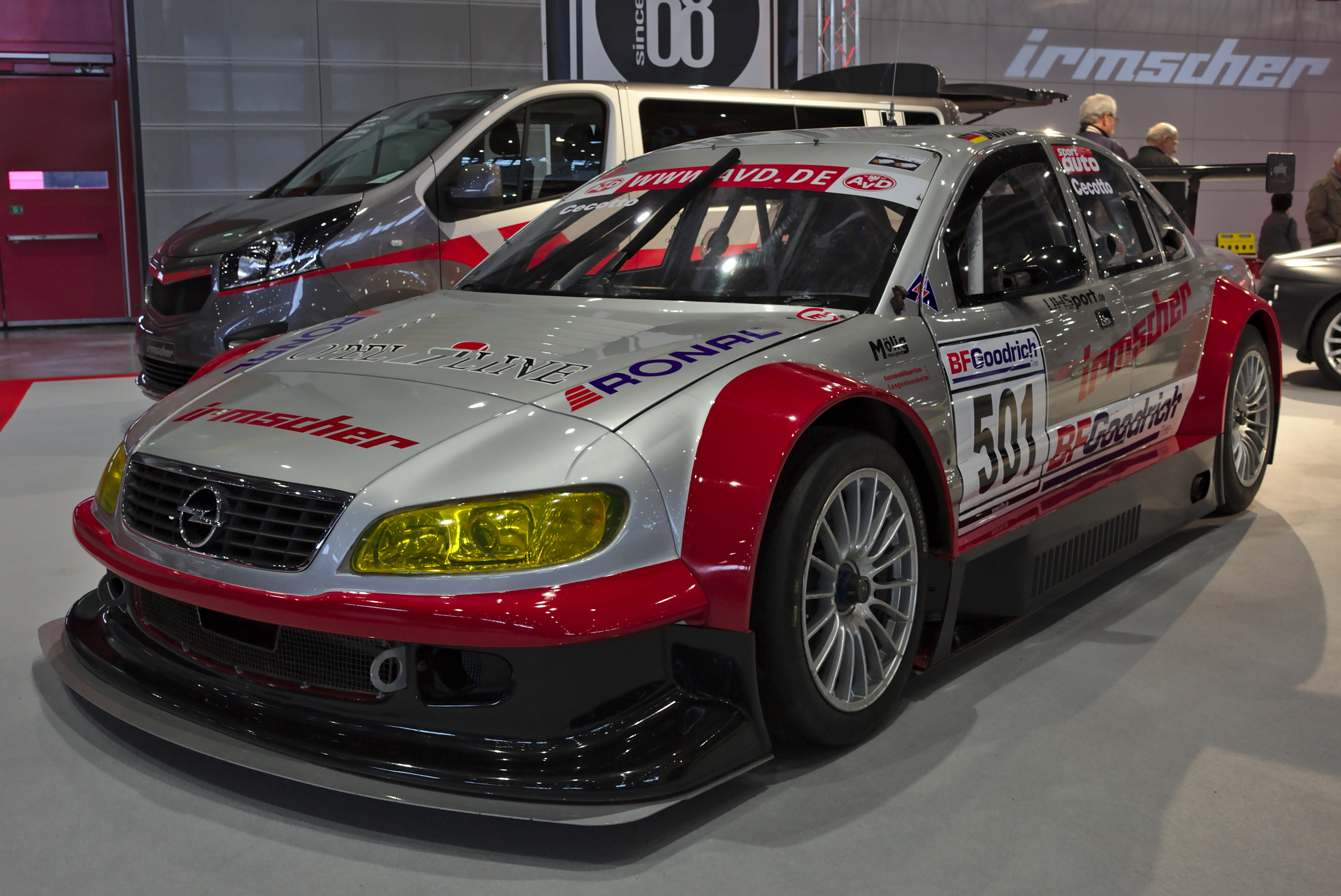
Irmscher Opel Omega B V8 Star

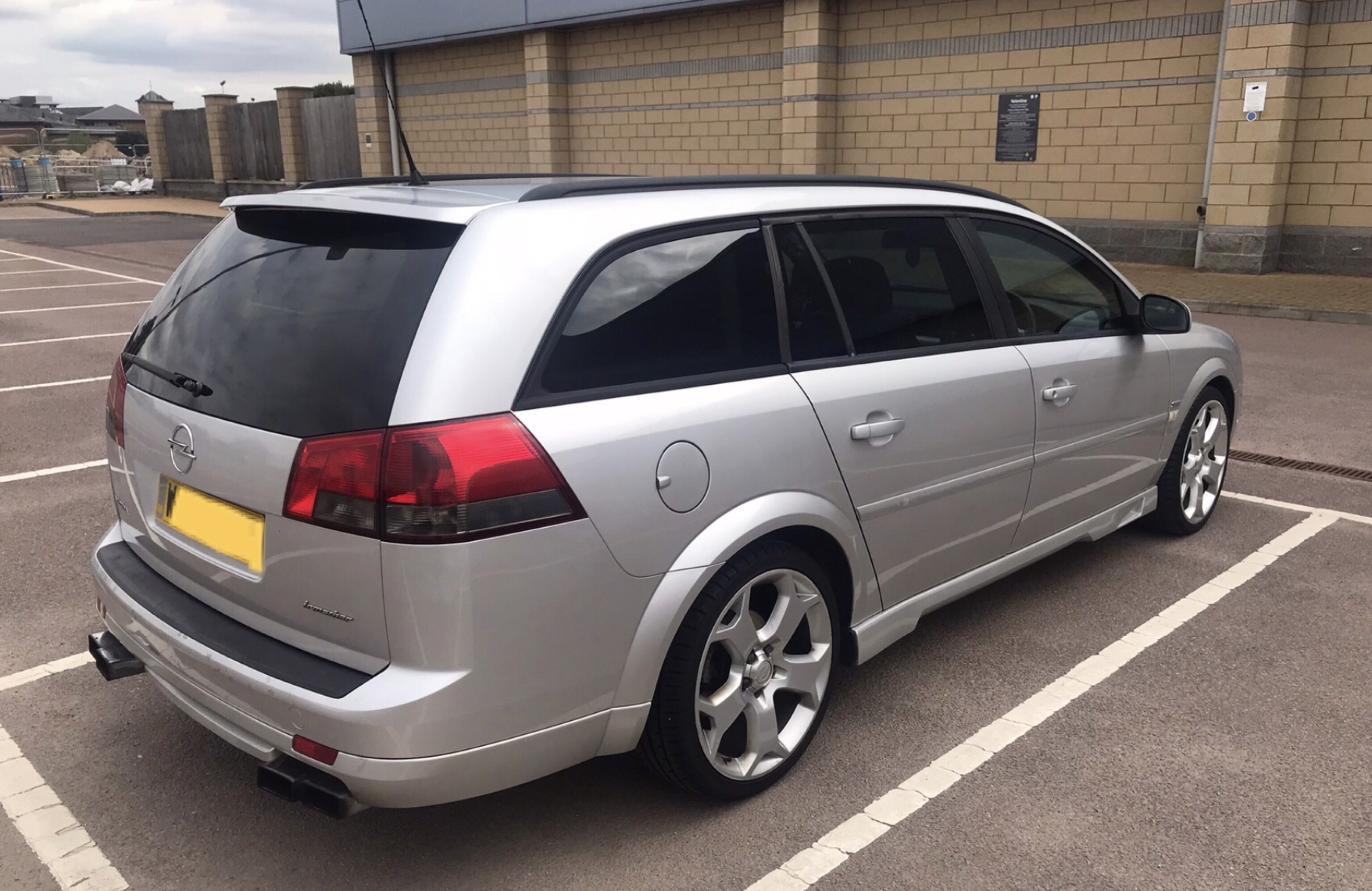
Opel Vectra C Irmscher Caravan

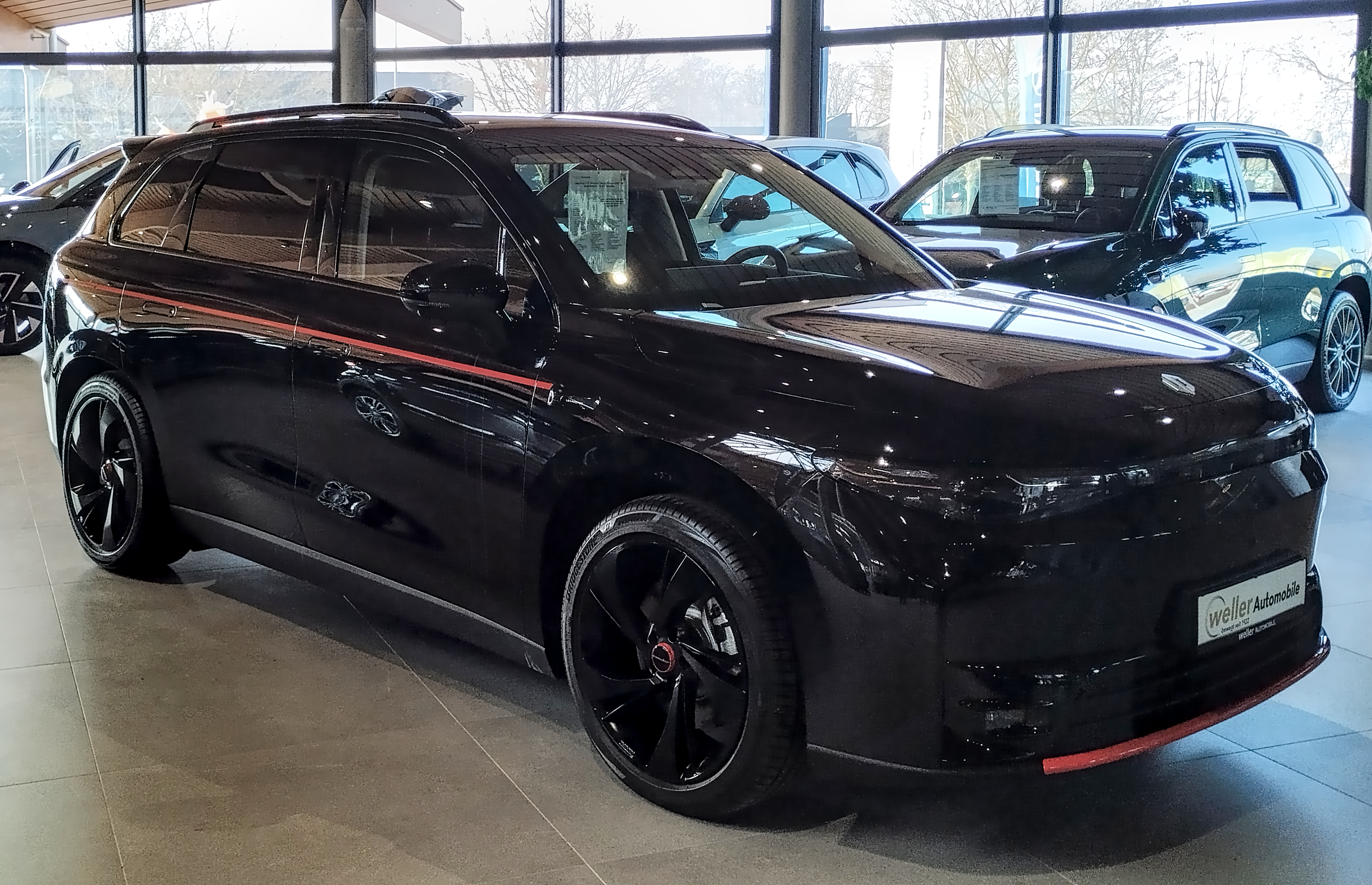
Leapmotor iC10 Irmscher
