= Sascha Bert =

German racing driver (born 1976)

Sascha Bert (born 5 March 1976 in Darmstadt, West Germany) is a German former racing driver.
