= Circuit Zolder =

Motorsport track in Belgium

- Grand Prix Circuit (2002–present)
- Location: Heusden-Zolder, Belgium
- Coordinates: 50°59′20″N 5°15′20″E
- Capacity: 60,000
- FIA Grade: 2
- Broke ground: 1962
- Opened: 19 June 1963; 63 years ago
- Major events: Current: ETRC Belgian Truck Grand Prix (1987, 1989–1995, 1997–present); NASCAR Euro Series (2015–present); 24 Hours of Zolder (1983–2019, 2021–present); Former: Formula One; Belgian Grand Prix (1973, 1975–1982, 1984); Grand Prix motorcycle racing Belgian motorcycle Grand Prix (1980); FIA WTCR Race of Belgium (2010–2011, 2020); FIM EWC (1971–1972, 2006); Sidecar World Championship (1980); FIA ETCR (2022); TCR Europe (2016, 2020, 2024); DTM (2002, 2019–2021); Blancpain GT Series (2014–2015, 2017–2018); W Series (2019); Superleague Formula (2008–2011); Champ Car Belgian Champ Car Grand Prix (2007); FIA GT (1999–2001, 2007–2009); Masters of Formula 3 (2007–2008)
- Website: http://www.circuit-zolder.be

Grand Prix Circuit (2002–present)
- Length: 4.010 km (2.492 mi)
- Turns: 10
- Race lap record: 1:14.089 ( (France) Sébastien Bourdais, Panoz DP01, 2007, Champ Car)

Grand Prix Circuit (1986–2001)
- Length: 4.184 km (2.600 mi)
- Turns: 10
- Race lap record: 1:28.270 ( (France) Olivier Grouillard, Lola T88/50, 1988, F3000)

Grand Prix Circuit (1975–1985)
- Length: 4.262 km (2.648 mi)
- Turns: 15
- Race lap record: 1:19.294 ( (France) René Arnoux, Ferrari 126C4, 1984, F1)

Grand Prix Circuit (1973–1974)
- Length: 4.220 km (2.622 mi)
- Turns: 14
- Race lap record: 1:23.850 ( (Belgium) Teddy Pilette, Chevron B28, 1974, F5000)

Original Grand Prix Circuit (1963–1972)
- Length: 4.186 km (2.601 mi)
- Turns: 12
- Race lap record: 1:26.400 ( (Austria) Jochen Rindt, Lotus 69, 1970, F2)

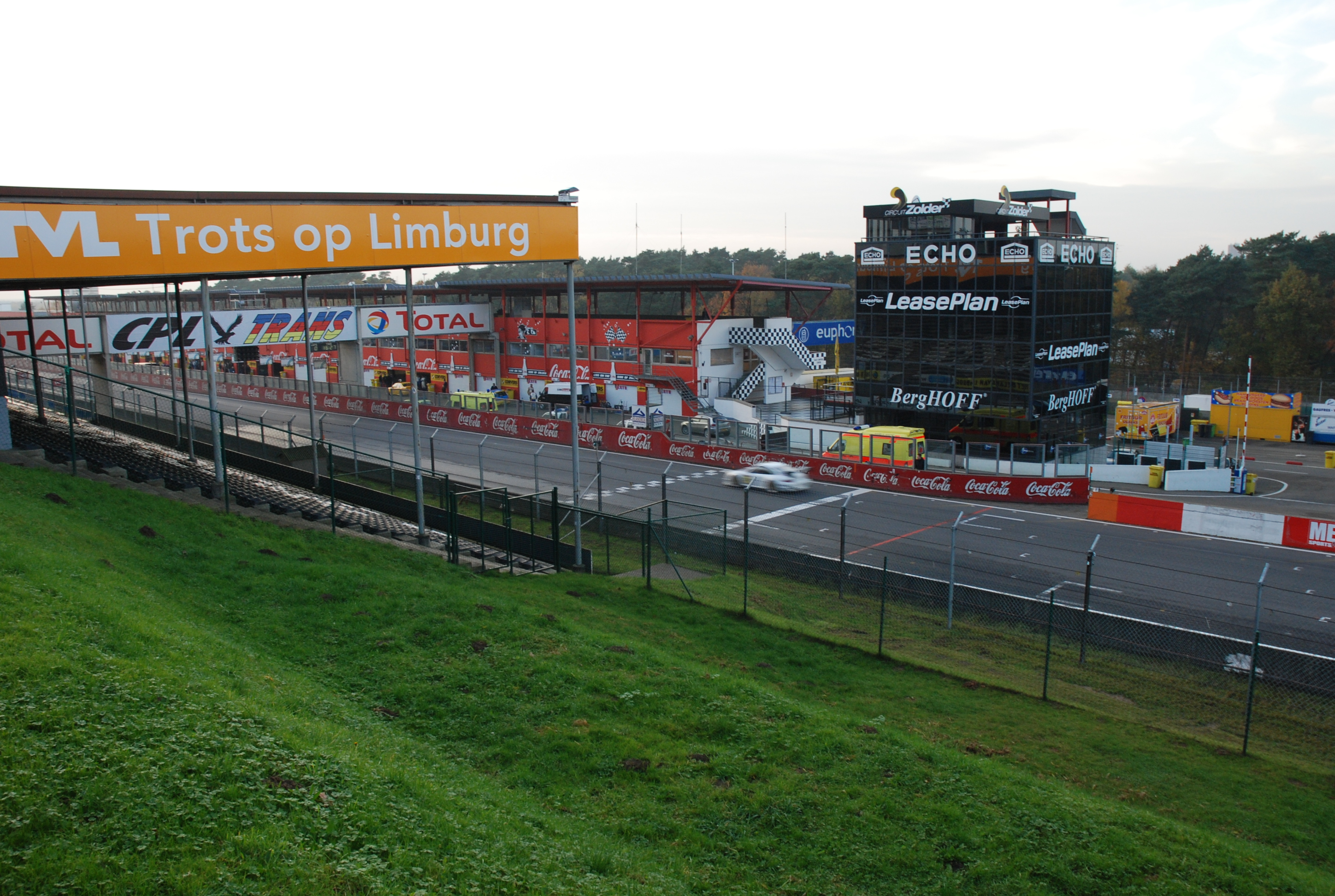
Circuit Zolder, 6 November 2008

The Circuit Zolder, also known as Circuit Terlamen, is an undulating 4.011 km (2.492 mi) motorsport race track in Heusden-Zolder, Belgium.

== History ==
Designed by John Hugenholtz and built in 1963, Zolder hosted the Formula One Belgian Grand Prix on 10 separate occasions in the 1970s and 1980s, as well as the 1980 Belgian motorcycle Grand Prix. F1 moved to Zolder in 1973 and with the exception of two races at Nivelles-Baulers in 1972 and 1974 (both won by Emerson Fittipaldi), Zolder was the location of the Belgian Grand Prix until 1982. That year, Canadian driver Gilles Villeneuve was killed during qualifying at the 1982 Belgian Grand Prix. Villeneuve's Ferrari 126C2 collided at speed with the March 821 of Jochen Mass. The Ferrari was torn up in the accident and when rolling, Villeneuve was thrown from the car.

After Villeneuve's death, the Belgian Grand Prix was held at Spa-Francorchamps in 1983, before returning to Zolder one final time in 1984. Fittingly, Ferrari driver Michele Alboreto won the race carrying Villeneuve's #27 on his car. Since 1985, the Belgian Grand Prix has permanently moved to Spa.

Zolder has also been used for cycling events including the UCI Road World Championships twice in 1969 and 2002 and the UCI Cyclo-cross World Championships in 1970, 2002 and 2016. The latter saw the first confirmed use of mechanical doping when Femke Van den Driessche was found to have a secret motor inside her bike. Since 2009, Circuit Zolder has hosted a cyclo-cross race in December for the World Cup. The circuit hosted the UCI BMX World Championships in 2015. In 2019 and for the first time ever the UCI BMX World Championships returned to Circuit Zolder.

In the beginning of 2006, the track underwent safety adaptations. In 2007, the track hosted a Champ Car World Series Grand Prix, and a round of the FIA GT Championship. The track was venue of a round of the World Series by Renault championship from 2003 to 2006, and replaced Zandvoort as site for the Masters of Formula 3 in 2007 and 2008. Zolder was featured on the car programme Top Gear in 2008. In the episode, the show's British hosts competed against their German counterparts from D MOTOR. Zolder hosted also the FIA WTCC Race of Belgium in 2010, 2011, and 2020. The last race they drove in 2011 was won by Rob Huff in a Chevrolet and Gabriele Tarquini in a SEAT. The WTCC then disappeared from the Belgian circuits until in 2014 the circus returned to Spa.

At this time, mainly the Blancpain Sprint Series and the BRCC national championship hosted a race in Zolder. The 24 Hours of Zolder endurance event is also held as a stand-alone event around the end of August or the beginning of September. NASCAR Whelen Euro Series have hosted their final race of the season in Zolder since 2015.

In 2019, for the first time in 17 years, the Deutsche Tourenwagen Masters returned to Circuit Zolder. But the circuit lost its place in the DTM calendar to Spa-Francorchamps in 2022.

== Noise limits ==
In general Circuit Zolder has a noise limit of 96 dbA, which is measured at 2 points along the track. One is just after turn 4 (Bianchi) and the second one is between turn 7 and 8. These can be recognised by blue poles. During international test days and most racing weekends, the noise limits are removed.

== Layout history ==
Circuit Zolder layout history
Original Grand Prix Circuit (1963–1972)

Grand Prix Circuit (1973–1974)

Grand Prix Circuit (1975–1985)

Grand Prix Circuit (1986–2001)

Grand Prix Circuit (2002–present)

== Events ==
Current

- May: Belcar New Race Festival, Porsche Sprint Challenge Benelux
- June: Supercar Challenge Supercar Madness
- July: DMV Goodyear Racing Days
- August: Belcar 24 Hours of Zolder, Historic Grand Prix Zolder
- September: FIA European Truck Racing Championship Belgian Truck Grand Prix
- October: NASCAR Euro Series NASCAR GP Belgium - EuroNASCAR Finals, Porsche Carrera Cup Benelux, Fun Cup, Belcar

Former

- ADAC Formel Masters (2011)
- ADAC GT Masters (2007, 2011)
- ATS Formel 3 Cup (1972–1973, 1977–1979, 1981–1988, 1990–1994, 2000, 2011)
- Auto GP (2001, 2004, 2009, 2017)
- BMW M1 Procar Championship (1979)
- Blancpain Sprint Series (2014–2015, 2017–2018)
- BOSS GP (2000, 2003–2010, 2013, 2015, 2017)
- British Formula 3 International Series (1976, 1984–1986)
- Champ Car World Series
  - Belgian Champ Car Grand Prix (2007)
- Deutsche Tourenwagen Masters (2002, 2019–2021)
- Deutsche Tourenwagen Meisterschaft (1984–1994)
- DTM Trophy (2020)
- ERA Championship (2022)
- Eurocup Formula Renault 2.0 (2001, 2005–2007)
- Eurocup Mégane Trophy (2005–2007)
- European Formula 5000 Championship (1974–1975)
- European Formula Two Championship (1975, 1980, 1983)
- European Touring Car Championship (1963–1968, 1977–1988, 2001)
- European Touring Car Cup (2015, 2017)
- FIA ETCR – eTouring Car World Cup (2022)
- FIA European Formula 3 Championship (1977–1984)
- FIA Formula Two Championship (2010)
- FIA GT Championship (1999–2001, 2007–2009)
- FIA GT1 World Championship (2011–2012)
- FIM Endurance World Championship (1971–1972, 2006)
- Formula 750 (1977)
- Formula BMW ADAC (2002)
- Formula BMW Europe (2008)
- Formula One
  - Belgian Grand Prix (1973, 1975–1982, 1984)
- Formula Renault 3.5 Series (2005–2006)
- Formula Volkswagen Germany (2001–2002)
- French Formula Renault Championship (1978–1982)
- Grand Prix motorcycle racing
  - Belgian motorcycle Grand Prix (1980)
- GT4 European Series (2009, 2011, 2018)
- IDM Superbike Championship (1996, 2013–2019)
- International Formula 3000 (1988)
- International GTSprint Series (2013)
- International Sports Racing Series (1997)
- Masters of Formula 3 (2007–2008)
- Motocross of Nations (2003)
- Porsche Carrera Cup Germany (1989–1998, 2002)
- SEAT León Eurocup (2010)
- Sidecar World Championship (1980)
- Super Tourenwagen Cup (1994–1997)
- Superleague Formula
  - Superleague Formula round Belgium (2008–2011)
- Superstars Series (2013)
- TCR Europe Touring Car Series (2016, 2020, 2024)
- V8Star Series (2002)
- W Series (2019)
- World Series by Nissan (2003–2004)
- World Touring Car Championship
  - FIA WTCC Race of Belgium (2010–2011)
- World Touring Car Cup
  - FIA WTCR Race of Belgium (2020)

Cycling

- 1981 Tour de France
- 2002 UCI Road World Championships
- 2002 UCI Cyclo-cross World Championships
- 2016 UCI Cyclo-cross World Championships
- 2019 UCI BMX World Championships
- Grand Prix Erik De Vlaeminck
- Telenet SuperPrestige Cyclocross

== Lap records ==
The unofficial all-time outright track record is 1:12.821, set by Sébastien Bourdais in a Panoz DP01, during 2nd qualifying for the 2007 Belgian Champ Car Grand Prix. As of September 2025, the fastest official race lap records at the Circuit Zolder are listed as:

Category	Time	Driver	Vehicle	Event
Grand Prix Circuit (2002–present): 4.010 km (2.492 mi)
Champ Car	1:14.089	Sébastien Bourdais	Panoz DP01	2007 Belgian Champ Car Grand Prix
F1	1:14.108	Klaas Zwart	Jaguar R5	2019 Zolder Maxx Formula round
Formula Renault 3.5	1:17.781	Pastor Maldonado	Dallara T05	2006 Zolder Formula Renault 3.5 Series round
Superleague Formula	1:18.806	Davide Rigon	Panoz DP09	2010 Zolder Superleague Formula round
Class 1 Touring Cars	1:20.140	René Rast	Audi RS5 Turbo DTM 2020	2020 2nd Zolder DTM round
Formula Nissan	1:22.162	Franck Montagny	Dallara SN01	2003 Zolder World Series by Nissan round
FTwo (2009–2012)	1.24.038	Sergey Afanasyev	Williams JPH1B	2010 Zolder Formula Two round
Formula Three	1.25.680	James Jakes	Dallara F305	2007 Masters of Formula 3
GT1 (GTS)	1:26.220	Andrea Bertolini	Maserati MC12 GT1	2009 FIA GT Zolder 2 Hours
GT3	1:27.257	Nico Müller	Audi R8 LMS Evo	2021 Zolder DTM round
Formula Renault 2.0	1:28.094	Xavier Maassen	Tatuus FR2000	2006 Zolder Eurocup Formula Renault 2.0 round
Formula Regional	1:29.629	Beitske Visser	Tatuus F3 T-318	2019 Zolder W Series round
Porsche Carrera Cup	1:30.224	Jaap van Lagen	Porsche 911 (992 I) GT3 Cup	2025 Zolder Porsche Carrera Cup Benelux round
GT2	1:31.449	Gianmaria Bruni	Ferrari F430 GT2	2008 FIA GT Zolder 2 Hours
Superbike	1:31.676	Markus Reiterberger	BMW S1000RR	2017 Zolder IDM Superbike round
Formula Volkswagen	1:32.040	Sven Barth	Reynard Formula Volkswagen	2002 Zolder Formula Volkswagen Germany round
FIA GT Group-2	1:32.523	Stefan Mücke	Aston Martin Vantage GT2	2008 FIA GT Zolder 2 Hours
Eurocup Mégane Trophy	1:33.107	Jaap van Lagen	Renault Mégane Renault Sport	2006 Zolder Eurocup Mégane Trophy round
Formula BMW	1:34.775	Esteban Gutiérrez	Mygale FB02	2008 Zolder Formula BMW Europe round
Supersport	1:35.253	Marc Buchner	Yamaha YZF-R6	2019 Zolder IDM Supersport round
ADAC Formel Masters	1:35.340	Artem Markelov	Dallara Formulino	2011 Zolder ADAC Formel Masters round
GT4	1:36.506	Lucas Mauron	Audi R8 LMS GT4 Evo	2020 Zolder DTM Trophy round
TCR Touring Car	1:36.724	Nathanaël Berthon	Audi RS 3 LMS TCR (2017)	2020 FIA WTCR Race of Belgium
Stock car racing	1:36.901	Alon Day	Chevrolet Camaro NASCAR	2020 Zolder NASCAR Whelen Euro Series round
V8Star Series	1:39.249	Roland Asch	V8Star car	2002 Zolder V8Star round
Formula Renault 1.6	1:39.277	Roy Geerts	Signatech FR 1.6	2013 Zolder Formula Renault 1.6 NEC round
Super 2000	1:39.517	Robert Huff	Chevrolet Cruze 1.6T	2011 FIA WTCC Race of Belgium
ETCR	1:39.949	Nicky Catsburg	Hyundai Veloster N ETCR	2022 Zolder ETCR round
DTM	1:42.558	Laurent Aiello	Abt-Audi TT-R DTM	2002 Zolder DTM round
SEAT León Eurocup	1:42.897	Lourenço Beirão da Veiga	SEAT León Supercopa	2010 Zolder SEAT León Eurocup round
Supersport 300	1:46.092	Victor Steeman	KTM RC 390 R	2018 Zolder IDM Supersport 300 round
ERA	1:52.798	Michelangelo Amendola	Mitsu-Bachi F110e	2022 Zolder ERA round
Super 1600	1:53.734	Niklas Mackschin	Ford Fiesta 1.6 16V	2015 Zolder ETC round
Truck racing	1:56.599	Norbert Kiss	MAN TGS	2025 Zolder ETRC round
Grand Prix Circuit (1986–2001): 4.184 km (2.600 mi)
F3000	1:28.270	Olivier Grouillard	Lola T88/50	1988 Zolder F3000 round
Formula Three	1:29.750	Christijan Albers	Dallara F399	1999 Zolder New Race Festival
LMP	1:31.170	Manuel Reuter	Kremer-Porsche CK7 Spyder	1992 Internationale AvD - EG - Troophy Zolder
GT1 (GTS)	1:31.348	Mike Hezemans	Chrysler Viper GTS-R	2001 FIA GT Zolder 500km
WSC	1:31.552	Didier Theys	Ferrari 333 SP	1997 International Sports Racing Series Zolder
Formula Renault 2.0	1:31.605	Ronnie Quintarelli	Tatuus FR2000	2001 Zolder Formula Renault 2000 Eurocup round
Formula Volkswagen	1:33.331	Marko Nevalainen	Reynard Formula Volkswagen	2001 Zolder Formula Volkswagen Germany round
N-GT	1:35.136	Christian Pescatori	Ferrari 360 Modena N-GT	2001 FIA GT Zolder 500km
Super Touring	1:35.432	Gabriele Tarquini	Honda Accord	2001 Zolder ESTC round
GT2	1:35.636	Julian Bailey	Lister Storm GT	1999 FIA GT Zolder 500km
Class 1 Touring Cars	1:38.050	Nicola Larini (Note: Both drivers took the same lap time in both races of this round.); Alessandro Nannini	Alfa Romeo 155 V6 TI	1994 Zolder DTM round
Superbike	1:38.708	Christer Lindholm	Ducati 916	1996 Zolder IDM Superbike round
GT1	1:39.275	Bert Longin	Dauer 962 LM	1999 Zolder Belcar round
Group A	1:42.110	Klaus Ludwig	Mercedes 190E 2.5-16 Evo2	1992 Zolder DTM round
Group N	1:48.400	Johnny Cecotto	BMW M3 GTR	1993 Internationales ADAC Westfalen-Pokal-Rennen Zolder
Grand Prix Circuit (1975–1985): 4.262 km (2.648 mi)
F1	1:19.294	René Arnoux	Ferrari 126C4	1984 Belgian Grand Prix
Formula Two	1:25.090	Jonathan Palmer	Ralt RH6/83	1983 Zolder F2 round
Group C	1:27.040	John Fitzpatrick	Porsche 956	1983 Bergischer Löwe Zolder
Formula Three	1:30.800	John Nielsen	Ralt RT3	1984 Zolder European F3 round
Formula 5000	1:30.900	Ian Ashley	Lola T400	1975 Zolder F5000 round
Group 5	1:31.050	Manfred Winkelhock	Ford Capri III Turbo	1981 Int. 15. ADAC-Westfalen-Pokalrennen Zolde
Group 6	1:34.900	Martin Raymond	Chevron B31	1976 Grote Prijs van Limburg
Group B	1:38.420	Harald Grohs	BMW M1	1983 Bergischer Löwe Zolder
BMW M1 Procar	1:39.140	Elio de Angelis	BMW M1 Procar	1979 Zolder BMW M1 Procar round
500cc	1:40.820	Marco Lucchinelli	Suzuki RGB500	1980 Belgian motorcycle Grand Prix
Formula Renault 2.0	1:42.000	Joël Gouhier	Martini MK20	1978 Zolder French Formula Renault round
Group 4	1:44.800	Raymond Raus	Porsche 934	1977 13e Bekers de Toekomst, Coupes de l'Avenir
Group 2	1:45.200	Dieter Quester	BMW 3.0 CSL	1977 Zolder ETCC round
Group A	1:46.530	Gianfranco Brancatelli	Volvo 240 Turbo	1985 Zolder ETCC round
Grand Prix Circuit (1973–1974): 4.220 km (2.622 mi)
Formula 5000	1:23.850	Teddy Pilette	Chevron B28	1974 Zolder F5000 round
F1	1:25.420	François Cevert	Tyrrell 006	1973 Belgian Grand Prix
Original Grand Prix Circuit (1963–1972): 4.186 km (2.601 mi)
Formula Two	1:26.400	Jochen Rindt	Lotus 69	1970 Grote Prijs van Limborg
Formula Junior	1:41.000	Peter Arundell	Lotus 27	1963 Grote Prijs van Zolder Junior
Group 5	1:48.400	Frank Gardner	Ford Escort Mk.I Twin Cam	1968 Zolder ETCC round
Group 2	1:50.006	Jacques Demoulin	Alfa Romeo 1600 GTA	1967 Zolder ETCC round
