= Motorsport Arena Oschersleben =

Race track in Germany

- Motorcycle "A" Circuit (1997–present)

- Grand Prix Circuit (2007–present)
- Location: Oschersleben, Germany
- Coordinates: 52°01′38″N 11°16′43″E
- FIA Grade: 2 ("A" Circuit) (Note: Motorsport Arena Oschersleben's Grade 2 license expired on 1 September 2026.)
- Broke ground: 5 April 1995; 31 years ago
- Opened: 25 July 1997; 29 years ago
- Construction cost: €58 million
- Former names: Motopark Oschersleben (1997–2005)
- Major events: Current: Sidecar World Championship (1998, 2000–2003, 2011–2019, 2021–present); DTM (2000–2001, 2004–2015, 2023–present); Former: NASCAR Euro Series (2023–2025); World SBK (2000–2004); WTCC Race of Germany (2005–2011); FIM EWC; 8 Hours of Oschersleben (1999–2009, 2012–2019); TCR Eastern Europe (2023); International GT Open (2007); FIA GT (1998–1999, 2002–2009)
- Website: http://www.motorsportarena.com

Motorcycle "A" Circuit (1997–present)
- Length: 3.668 km (2.279 mi)
- Race lap record: 1:15.050 ( (Austria) Andreas Zuber, Dallara T05, 2005, FR 3.5)

Grand Prix Circuit (2007–present)
- Length: 3.696 km (2.297 mi)
- Race lap record: 1:18.846 ( (Russia) Sergey Afanasyev, Lola B05/52, 2011, Auto GP)

"B" Circuit (1997–present)
- Length: 2.600 km (1.616 mi)

"C" Circuit (1997–present)
- Length: 1.100 km (0.684 mi)

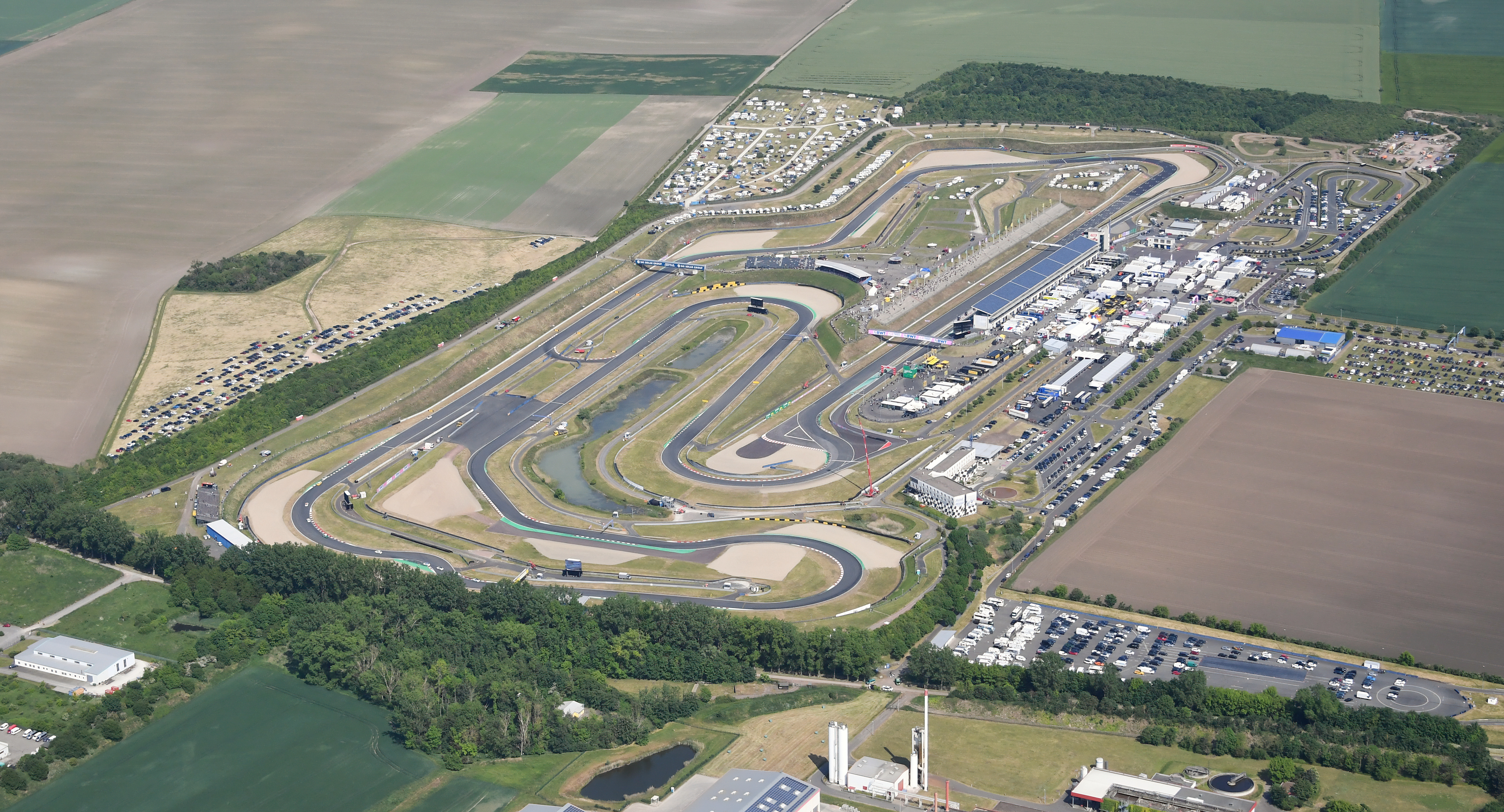
Aerial view of the Motorsport Arena Oschersleben

The Motorsport Arena Oschersleben is a motorsport racetrack located in Oschersleben, Börde, Germany, about 30 km (19 mi) west of Magdeburg. Opened on 25 July 1997 as Motopark Oschersleben, it was Germany's fourth permanent racecourse, after Nürburgring, Hockenheimring and Sachsenring.

The track currently hosts an annual round of the Deutsche Tourenwagen Masters and Sidecar World Championship as well as national and local club racing. It was a former venue for international series such as the FIM Endurance World Championship, Superbike World Championship, FIA GT Championship, European Touring Car Championship and World Touring Car Championship.

== The circuit ==
The main layout has a length of 3.696 km (2.297 mi), a width of 11–13 m (36–43 ft), and elevation changes of 23 m (75 ft).

Consistently driving quickly is hard work on the fast and smooth circuit. The first turn, modified from its original rounded shape into a sharp 90-degree left, is a frequent source of multi-car accidents especially on the first lap, as a popular YouTube video of a touring car race illustrates this case, with former BTCC driver-turned commentator John Cleland remarking that, "The guy who designed this first corner should be taken into a dark room and beat about the head". There are many key turns to master for a fast lap. The end of the finish straight is the fastest spot on the circuit. The McDonald's chicane allows for different racing lines. However, an aggressive line may lead to early retirement with broken suspension.

== Events ==
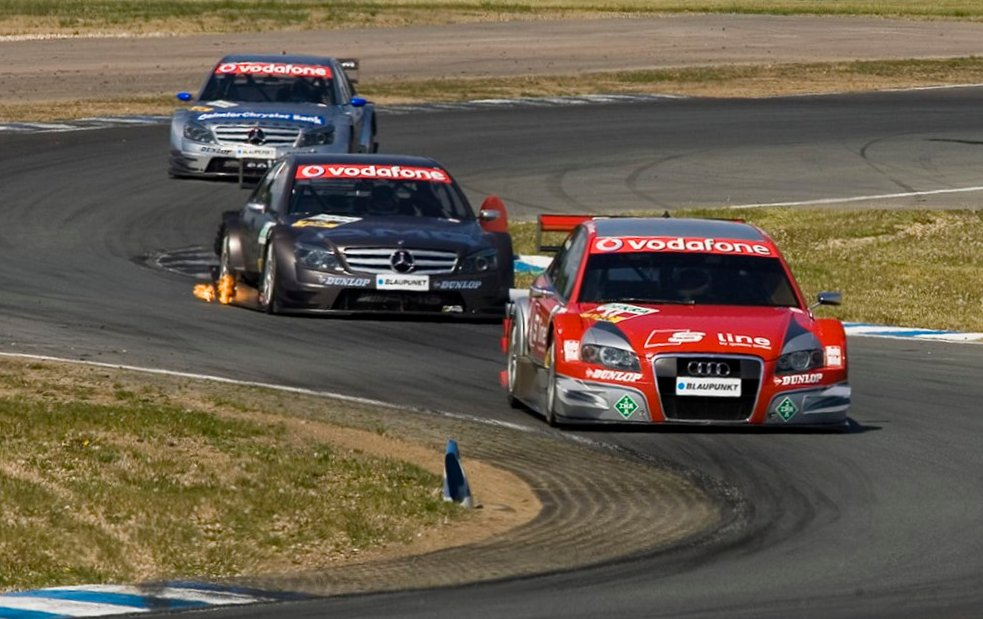
DTM in 2007

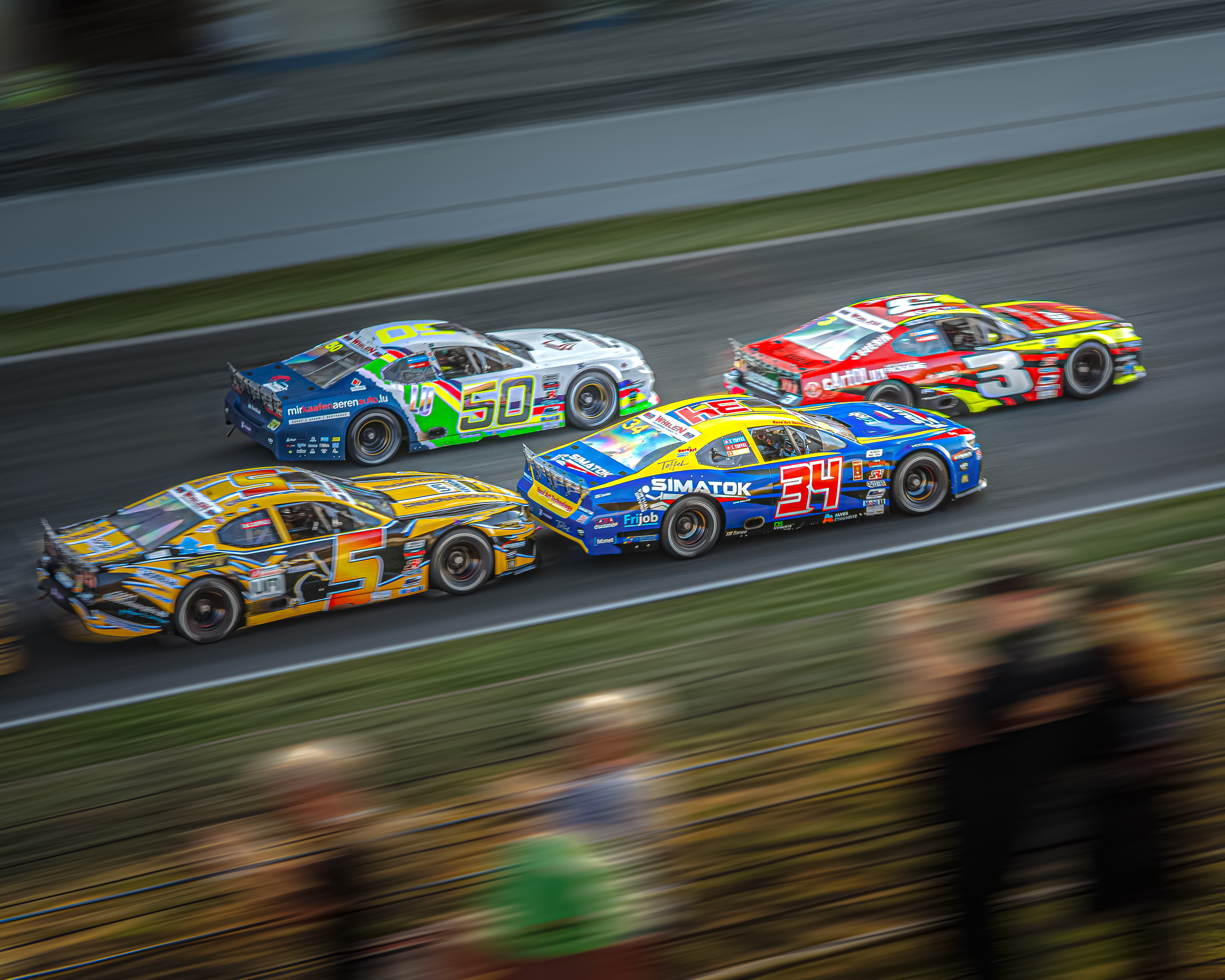
NASCAR Euro Series in 2024

Current

- April: DMV Goodyear Racing Days
- May: Porsche Sports Cup Deutschland ADAC Racing Weekend Oschersleben
- July: Deutsche Tourenwagen Masters, ADAC GT4 Germany
- August: IDM Superbike Championship, Moto4 Northern Cup
- October: Sidecar World Championship Sidecar Festival

Future

- F4 Germany Championship (2015–2020, 2027)

Former

- ADAC Formel Masters (2008–2014)
- ADAC GT Masters (2007–2022, 2024)
- ADAC TCR Germany Touring Car Championship (2016–2022)
- ATS Formel 3 Cup (1998–2001, 2003–2014)
- Audi TT Sport Cup (2015)
- Auto GP (2011)
- EuroBOSS Series (2006)
- Eurocup Formula Renault 2.0 (2002–2005)
- European Touring Car Championship (2002–2004)
- Ferrari Challenge Europe (1998, 2005)
- FIA Formula Two Championship (2009–2010)
- FIA GT Championship (1998–1999, 2002–2009)
- FIA GT3 European Championship (2006, 2008–2009)
- FIA Sportscar Championship (2003)
- FIM Endurance World Championship
  - 8 Hours of Oschersleben (1999–2009, 2012–2019)
- FIM eRoad Racing World Cup (2012–2013)
- Formula BMW ADAC (1998–2001, 2004–2007)
- Formula BMW Talent Cup (2011–2013)
- Formula Renault 3.5 Series (2005)
- Formula Renault V6 Eurocup (2003–2004)
- Formula Three Euroseries (2005–2006, 2009–2010)
- Formula Volkswagen Germany (2001–2003)
- GT4 European Cup (2007–2009)
- International Formula 3000 (1998)
- International Formula Master (2006–2009)
- International GT Open (2007)
- Interserie (2003)
- NASCAR Euro Series
  - NASCAR GP Germany (2023–2025)
- NXT Gen Cup (2023, 2025)
- Porsche Carrera Cup Germany (1997, 1999–2001, 2004–2016, 2018, 2020–2021, 2024)
- Prototype Cup Germany (2023)
- SEAT León Eurocup (2008–2010)
- Superbike World Championship (2000–2004)
- Supercar Challenge (2004, 2007, 2016, 2024)
- Supersport World Championship (2000–2004)
- Super Tourenwagen Cup (1998–1999)
- TCR Eastern Europe Touring Car Series (2023)
- TCR Europe Touring Car Series (2019)
- TCR International Series (2016–2017)
- Trofeo Maserati (2006)
- V8Star Series (2001–2002)
- World Touring Car Championship
  - FIA WTCC Race of Germany (2005–2011)

== Lap records ==
As of August 2026, the fastest official race lap records at Motorsport Arena Oschersleben are listed as:

Category	Time	Driver	Vehicle	Event	Circuit Map
Motorcycle "A" Circuit (1997–present): 3.668 km (2.279 mi)
Formula Renault 3.5	1:15.050	Andreas Zuber	Dallara T05	2005 Oschersleben Formula Renault 3.5 Series round	
Formula 3000	1:19.038	Luca Persiani	Lola B99/50	2006 Oschersleben F3000 Masters round	
Formula Three	1:19.183	Lewis Hamilton	Dallara F305	2005 Oschersleben Formula 3 Euro Series round	
GT1 (Prototype)	1:20.206	Jörg Müller	Porsche 911 GT1-98	1998 FIA GT Oschersleben 500km	
LMP3	1:20.305	Laurents Hörr	Duqueine D-08	2023 Oschersleben Prototype Cup Germany round	
DTM	1:20.791	Mattias Ekström	Audi A4 DTM 2005	2005 Oschersleben DTM round	
LMP675	1:21.377	Hayanari Shimoda	DBA4 03S	2003 FIA Sportscar Championship Oschersleben	
GT3	1:22.629	Ayhancan Güven	Porsche 911 (992 I) GT3 R	2023 Oschersleben DTM round	
GT1 (GTS)	1:23.527	Mike Hezemans	Chevrolet Corvette C6.R	2006 FIA GT Oschersleben 500km	
Superbike	1:23.654	Lukas Tulovic	Ducati Panigale V4 R	2025 1st Oschersleben IDM Superbike round	
Formula Renault 2.0	1:24.011	Xavier Maassen	Tatuus FR2000	2006 2nd Oschersleben Formula Renault 2.0 Northern European Cup round	
Formula 4	1:24.391	Jonny Edgar	Tatuus F4-T014	2020 Oschersleben ADAC Formula 4 round	
Formula Volkswagen	1:25.188	Sven Barth	Reynard Formula Volkswagen	2002 Oschersleben Formula Volkswagen Germany round	
Porsche Carrera Cup	1:26.389	Robert de Haan	Porsche 911 (992 I) GT3 Cup	2024 Oschersleben Porsche Carrera Cup Germany round	
World SBK	1:26.549	Colin Edwards	Honda VTR1000SP2	2002 Oschersleben World SBK round	
Supersport	1:26.683	Andreas Kofler	Yamaha YZF-R6	2025 1st Oschersleben IDM Supersport round	
FIM EWC	1:26.773	Josh Hook	Honda CBR1000RR	2019 8 Hours of Oschersleben	
GT2	1:27.220	Tim Mullen	Ferrari F430 GT2	2006 FIA GT Oschersleben 500km	
GT2 (GTS)	1:28.243	Karl Wendlinger	Chrysler Viper GTS-R	1999 FIA GT Oschersleben 500km	
Formula BMW	1:28.610	Sébastien Buemi	Mygale FB02	2005 Oschersleben Formula BMW ADAC round	
N-GT	1:28.650	Christian Pescatori	Ferrari 360 Modena GTC	2004 FIA GT Oschersleben 500km	
FIA GT Group-2	1:29.604	Shaun Balfe	Mosler MT900R	2005 FIA GT Oschersleben Supercar 500	
GT4	1:30.111	Jan Philipp Springbob	Mercedes-AMG GT4	2023 Oschersleben ADAC GT4 Germany round	
World SSP	1:30.386	Broc Parkes	Honda CBR600RR	2004 Oschersleben World SSP round	
Sportbike	1:30.475	Sasha de Wits	Kawasaki Ninja ZX-6R 636	2026 Oschersleben Euro-Moto Sportbike round	
Super Touring	1:30.632	Laurent Aïello	Peugeot 406	1998 Oschersleben STW Cup round	
TCR Touring Car	1:31.449 (Note: YouTube videos showed that the race was held in 3.668 km layout despite the reference wrote circuit length as 3.696 km.)	Adam Kout	Hyundai Elantra N TCR	2023 Oschersleben TCR Eastern Europe round	
Stock car racing	1:32.275	Vittorio Ghirelli	Chevrolet Camaro NASCAR	2024 Oschersleben NASCAR Whelen Euro Series round	
V8Star Series	1:32.446	Johnny Cecotto	V8Star car	2002 2nd Oschersleben V8Star round	
Super 2000	1:33.018	Frank Diefenbacher	SEAT Toledo Cupra	2004 Oschersleben ETCC round	
Moto3	1:33.537	Lorenzo Pontillo	Honda NSF250R	2025 Oschersleben Northern Talent Cup round	
Supersport 300	1:35.507	Marvin Siebdrath	Yamaha YZF-R3	2023 Oschersleben IDM Supersport 300 round	
250cc	1:35.666	Lenoxx Phommara	KTM RC4 R	2023 Oschersleben Northern Talent Cup round	
NXT Gen Cup	1:46.590	Lukas Stiefelhagen	LRT NXT1	2025 Oschersleben NXT Gen Cup round	
Grand Prix Circuit (2007–present): 3.696 km (2.297 mi)
Auto GP	1:18.846	Sergey Afanasyev	Lola B05/52	2011 Oschersleben Auto GP round	
Formula Three	1:20.623	Nabil Jeffri	Dallara F311	2014 Oschersleben German F3 round	
DTM	1:21.255	Joey Hand	BMW M3 DTM (E92)	2013 Oschersleben DTM round	
F2 (2009–2012)	1:21.449	Andy Soucek	Williams JPH1	2009 Oschersleben Formula Two round	
International Formula Master	1:21.619	Chris van der Drift	Tatuus N.T07	2008 Oschersleben Formula Master round	
GT1 (GTS)	1:25.477	Mike Hezemans	Chevrolet Corvette C6.R	2008 FIA GT Oschersleben 2 Hours	
Formula 4	1:26.386	Kim-Luis Schramm	Tatuus F4-T014	2016 1st Oschersleben ADAC Formula 4 round	
GT3	1:26.850	Philipp Eng	BMW M6 GT3	2017 Oschersleben ADAC GT Masters round	
Formula Renault 2.0	1:27.301	António Félix da Costa	Tatuus FR2000	2008 Oschersleben Formula Renault 2.0 Northern European Cup round	
GT2	1:29.241	Tim Mullen	Ferrari F430 GT2	2008 FIA GT Oschersleben 2 Hours	
ADAC Formel Masters	1:29.669	Mikkel Jensen	Dallara Formulino	2014 Oschersleben ADAC Formel Masters round	
Porsche Carrera Cup	1:30.518	Christopher Zöchling	Porsche 911 (991 I) GT3 Cup	2014 Oschersleben Porsche Carrera Cup Germany round	
Formula BMW	1:31.370	Marco Wittmann	Mygale FB02	2007 1st Oschersleben Formula BMW ADAC round	
FIA GT Group-2	1:33.113	Ales Jirásek	Mosler MT900	2008 FIA GT Oschersleben 2 Hours	
TCR Touring Car	1:35.557	Dušan Borković	SEAT León TCR	2016 Oschersleben TCR International Series round	
Super 2000	1:36.185	Tom Coronel	BMW 320 TC	2011 FIA WTCC Race of Germany	
Audi Sport TT Cup	1:36.363	Jan Kisiel	Audi TT Cup	2015 Oschersleben Audi Sport TT Cup round	
SEAT León Eurocup	1:37.521	Norbert Michelisz	SEAT León Supercopa	2009 Oschersleben SEAT León Eurocup round	
