= 2001 Formula Volkswagen Germany season =

Seasons
- ← none 2002 →

The 2001 Formula Volkswagen Germany supported by ZF Sachs was the inaugural season of the Formula Volkswagen Germany. All drivers competed in Volkswagen powered, Dunlop shod Reynard chassis.

== Calendar and results ==
Round	Circuit	Location	Date	Pole position	Fastest lap	Winning driver
1	Salzburgring	Salzburg, Austria	June 10	(Belgium) Philip Cloostermans	(Belgium) Philip Cloostermans	(Belgium) Philip Cloostermans
2	Nürburgring	Nürburg, Germany	July 21	(Austria) Walter Lechner Jr.	(Austria) Walter Lechner Jr.	(Austria) Walter Lechner Jr.
3	Lausitzring	Lausitz, Germany	August 5	(Australia) Rob Nguyen	(Germany) Sven Barth	(Germany) Sven Barth
4	Circuit Zolder	Zolder, Belgium	August 19	(Belgium) Philip Cloostermans	(Finland) Marko Nevelainen	(Finland) Marko Nevelainen
5	A1 Ring	Spielberg, Austria	August 26	(Germany) Sven Barth	(Germany) Sven Barth	(Germany) Sven Barth
6	Hockenheimring	Hockenheim, Germany	September 16	(Germany) Florian Stoll	(Belgium) Philip Cloostermans	(Italy) Marco Caldonazzi
7	Circuit Park Zandvoort	Zandvoort, Netherlands	September 23	(Italy) Marco Caldonazzi	(Netherlands) Elran Nijenhuis	(Germany) Sven Barth
8	Nürburgring	Nürburg, Germany	September 30	(Netherlands) Elran Nijenhuis	(Austria) Walter Lechner Jr.	(Netherlands) Elran Nijenhuis
9	Motorsport Arena Oschersleben	Oschersleben, Germany	October 14	(Austria) Walter Lechner Jr.	(Austria) Walter Lechner Jr.	(Austria) Walter Lechner Jr.

== Final standings ==
Color	Result
Gold	Winner
Silver	2nd place
Bronze	3rd place
Green	4th & 5th place
Light Blue	6th–10th place
Dark Blue	11th place or lower
Purple	Did not finish
Red	Did not qualify (DNQ)
Brown	Withdrawn (Wth)
Black	Disqualified (DSQ)
White	Did not start (DNS)
Blank	Did not participate (DNP)
Blank	Driver replacement (Rpl)
Blank	Injured (Inj)
Blank	No race held (NH)

Rank	Driver	(Austria) SAL	(Germany) NUR	(Germany) LAU	(Belgium) ZOL	(Austria) A1	(Germany) HOC	(Netherlands) ZAN	(Germany) NUR	(Germany) OSC	Points
1	(Austria) Walter Lechner Jr.	2	1	4	7	2		5	2	1	179
2	(Belgium) Philip Cloostermans	1	3	Ret	2	4	2	3	8	14	155
3	(Germany) Sven Barth	9	Ret	1	3	1	Ret	1	3	15	148
4	(Netherlands) Elran Nijenhuis	Ret	Ret	3	5	7	8	7	1	2	131
5	(Australia) Rob Nguyen	11	7	2	9	10	12	8	7	3	118
6	(Germany) Florian Stoll	5	2	Ret	16	3	6	6	Ret	7	110
7	(Italy) Marco Caldonazzi				8	11	1	2	6	6	107
8	(Germany) Jarno Unland	10	10	11	4	6	7	9	Ret	4	107
9	(Finland) Marko Nevelainen		4	6	1	Ret	Ret	4	5	11	105
10	(Germany) Stefan Haak	15	8	5	6	9	9	10	4	17	102
11	(Germany) Peter Heinrichsberger	12	13	7	11	12	3	12	12	12	89
12	(Germany) Bastian Kolmsee	4	5	Ret	Ret	5	4		11	8	89
13	(Belgium) Kim Hermans	3	6	8	Ret	Ret		15	9	10	77
14	(Germany) Sebastian Zschirpe	16		10	13	13	5	14	14	9	75
15	(Germany) Patric Rauscher	13	9		14	8	11	13	15	16	70
16	(Italy) Christian Gratl	6	11	Ret	17	Ret	Ret	Ret	16	5	51
17	(Austria) Michael Zottler	14		12	15	Ret	10	Ret	13	13	50
18	(Austria) Hubert Stromberger	8				Ret	Ret	11	10	Ret	34
19	(Germany) Amir Ghoreishi		Ret	13	18	14	13				27
20	(Germany) Christian Mamerow	Ret	Ret	9	10						23
21	(Germany) Henrik Wilking	7		Ret	Ret						14
	(United States) Casey Beadle				12						
	(Finland) Nikolai Kozarovitzky	Ret									
	(Austria) Harald Proczyk		12								
