= Lausitzring =

Race track located near Klettwitz, Germany

Dekra Lausitzring
- Detailed map of the Lausitzring including all layouts
- Location: Klettwitz (Brandenburg, Germany)
- Coordinates: 51°32′0″N 13°55′10″E
- Capacity: 120,000
- FIA Grade: 2 (2 layouts)
- Owner: Dekra Automobil GmbH (2017–present)
- Operator: EuroSpeedway Verwaltungs GmbH
- Broke ground: 17 June 1998; 28 years ago
- Opened: 20 August 2000; 26 years ago
- Former names: Lausitzring (2010–2017); EuroSpeedway Lausitz (2000–2009)
- Major events: Current: DTM (2000–present); ADAC GT Masters (2007–2017, 2020–2022, 2025–present); Former: European Truck Racing Championship (2001–2002, 2025); World SBK (2001–2002, 2005–2007, 2016–2017); Sidecar World Championship (2001–2002); Champ Car German 500 (2001, 2003); ADAC GT Masters (2007–2017, 2020–2022); FIA GT (2000); A1GP (2005); F3 Euroseries (2005–2006, 2009); World Series by Nissan (2003–2004); ASCAR Racing Series (2002–2003)
- Website: https://dekra-lausitzring.de/

Superspeedway (2000–present)
- Length: 3.256 km (2.023 mi)
- Turns: 3
- Banking: up to 5.7°
- Race lap record: 0:34.747 ( (Brazil) Tony Kanaan, Reynard 01I, 2001, CART)

Grand Prix Circuit (2000–present)
- Length: 4.345 km (2.700 mi)
- Turns: 14
- Race lap record: 1:32:059 ( (United Kingdom) Scott Mansell, Benetton B197, 2004, F1)

Grand Prix Circuit with Banked Turn 1 (2021–present)
- Length: 4.601 km (2.859 mi)
- Turns: 10
- Race lap record: 1:32.085 ( (Germany) Maro Engel, Mercedes-AMG GT3 Evo, 2022, GT3)

Motorcycle Circuit (2000–present)
- Length: 4.297 km (2.670 mi)
- Turns: 14
- Race lap record: 1:36.634 ( (United Kingdom) Chaz Davies, Ducati Panigale R, 2017, World SBK)

Sprint Circuit (2004–present)
- Length: 3.478 km (2.161 mi)
- Turns: 12
- Race lap record: 1:13.100 ( (France) Patrick d'Aubreby, Benetton B192, 2005, F1)

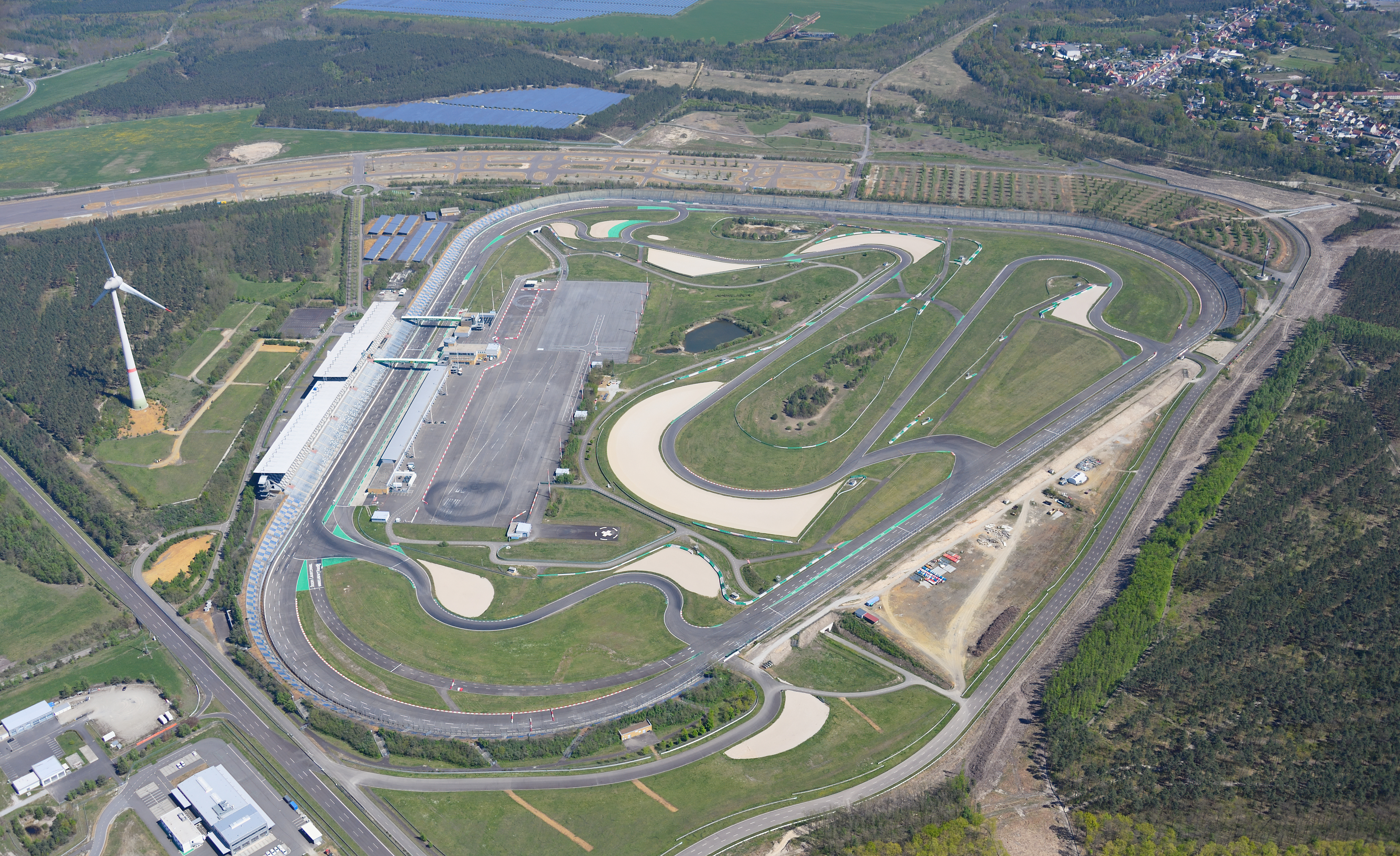
Aerial view of Lausitzring

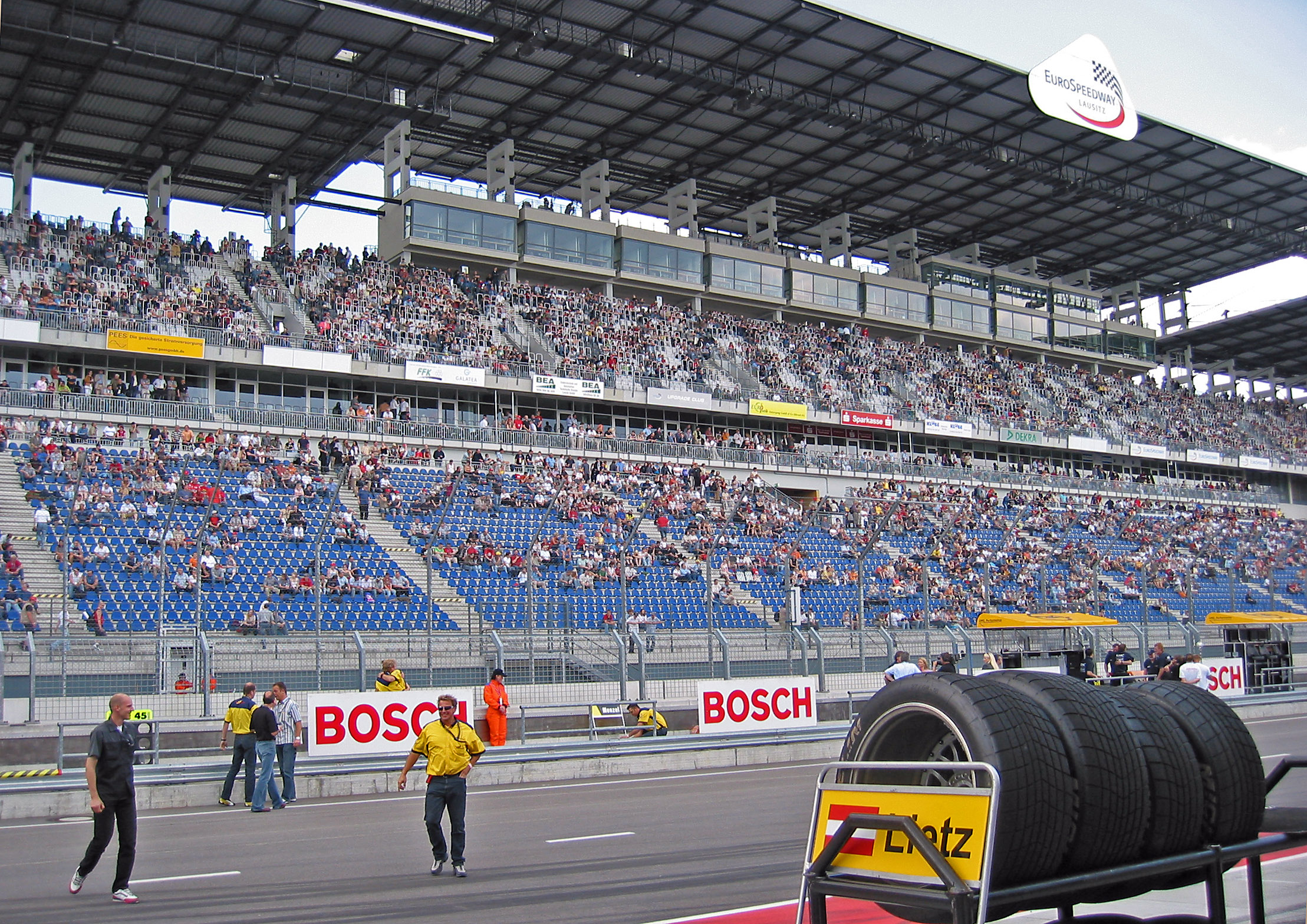
Grandstands on the front stretch

The Lausitzring (formally known as the Dekra Lausitzring for ownership reasons) is a race track and test track located near Klettwitz in the state of Brandenburg in northeast Germany, about 60 kilometres (37 miles) north of Dresden, near the borders of Poland and the Czech Republic. It was originally named Lausitzring as it is located in the region of Lusatia, known as Lausitz in German, but was renamed EuroSpeedway Lausitz for better international communication from 2000 to 2010. Lausitzring has been in use for motor racing since 2000. Among other series, DTM (German Touring Car Championship) takes place there annually. It also used to host the Superbike World Championship.

The Lausitzring has a feature which is unique in continental Europe: a high-speed oval race track, as used in the United States by NASCAR and IndyCar. The 3.256 km (2.023 mi) tri-oval (similar to Pocono Raceway) was used twice by open seater CART races named German 500 (the September 2001 American Memorial won by Kenny Bräck, and the May 2003 German 500 by Sébastien Bourdais), plus a few British SCSA Stock cars races. In 2005 and 2006, the German Formula Three Championship held races at the oval, with a pole position lap average speed of 251.761 km/h (156.437 mph) and a race average of 228.931 km/h (142.251 mph).

== History ==
As far back as 1986, in the former communist East Germany, it was planned to convert one of the huge open coal mine pits into a race track. In the late 1990s, this idea was taken up again in order to build a replacement for the AVUS in Berlin, which after the fall of the Berlin Wall had more traffic than before. The construction of the EuroSpeedway Lausitz began on 17 June 1998. The facility was officially opened during a public ceremony on 20 August 2000.

Winding in the infield of the high-speed tri-oval, there is a regular road race track for automobile and motorbike racing, using various track configurations up to roughly 4.562 km (2.835 mi). The stands around the tri-oval have a capacity of 120,000, while the huge main grandstands have 25,000 seats, and unlike many circuits, the entire circuit can be seen from the main grandstand. Next to the racing facility, there is a test oval with two long straights connecting two steeply banked U-shaped corners. The test oval has a total length of 5.800 km (3.604 mi), with each of its two straights measuring about 2.500 km (1.553 mi) in length. All tracks can be connected to form a 12.030 km (7.475 mi) long endurance racing course.

There were three serious accidents at the facility in its first year of operation. On 25 April 2001, former Formula One driver Michele Alboreto was killed on the test oval after crashing at high speed due to a tyre failure. Alboreto was testing an Audi R8 in preparation of his participation at the 2001 24 Hours of Le Mans. Just over a week later, on 3 May 2001, a track marshal was killed when he was hit by a touring car during a test session.

The third serious accident occurred on 15 September 2001, when the venue's tri-oval hosted the 2001 American Memorial. It was the first race of the American CART series to be held in Europe, but it was eventually overshadowed by the accident in which the series' two-time champion Alex Zanardi was involved. Zanardi lost control of his car at the pit exit following a late stop for fuel and the car slid onto the tri-oval, where it was hit from the side by Alex Tagliani's car at full speed. The impact split the front of Zanardi's car from the rest of it and caused the driver to suffer a traumatic amputation of both of his legs. Tagliani was not seriously injured, having suffered some bruising as a result of the crash.

The last concert of German hard rock band Böhse Onkelz took place on 17 and 18 June 2005 at the Lausitzring under the name Vaya Con Tioz, in front of approximately 120,000. It was the biggest open air show by a German band ever.

On 9 October 2005, Lausitzring played host to the A1 Grand Prix series on its road course. The fastest lap of the meeting was set by Nicolas Lapierre and was 0.45 seconds slower than the lap record for the 4.345 km (2.700 mi) circuit held by Heikki Kovalainen.

Lausitzring played host to Round 6 of the 2010 Red Bull Air Race World Championship. As the last two events of the 2010 Championship (Rounds 7 and 8) were cancelled, the 2011 series was cancelled as well. The series then suffered an overall three-year hiatus before finally returning in September 2016 and September 2017.

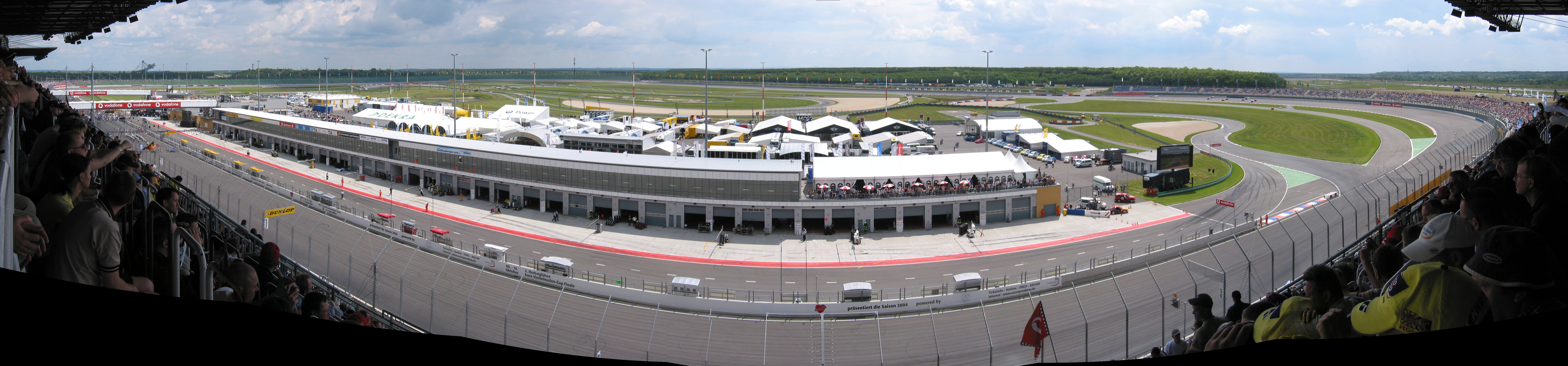
Panorama shot of the speedway from the grandstands

On 1 November 2017, the entire facility was sold to the vehicle inspection company Dekra, which announced plans to modernize it and use it as a proving ground for road car innovations. Amid fears that the purchase would mark the end of public racing events at the circuit, Dekra announced that it would not organize such events, but other companies would remain welcome to organize them and Dekra would rent the circuit to them for the purpose. The DTM has continued to organize races at the circuit ever since.

== Layout configurations ==
Lausitzring layout configurations
Superspeedway (2000–present)

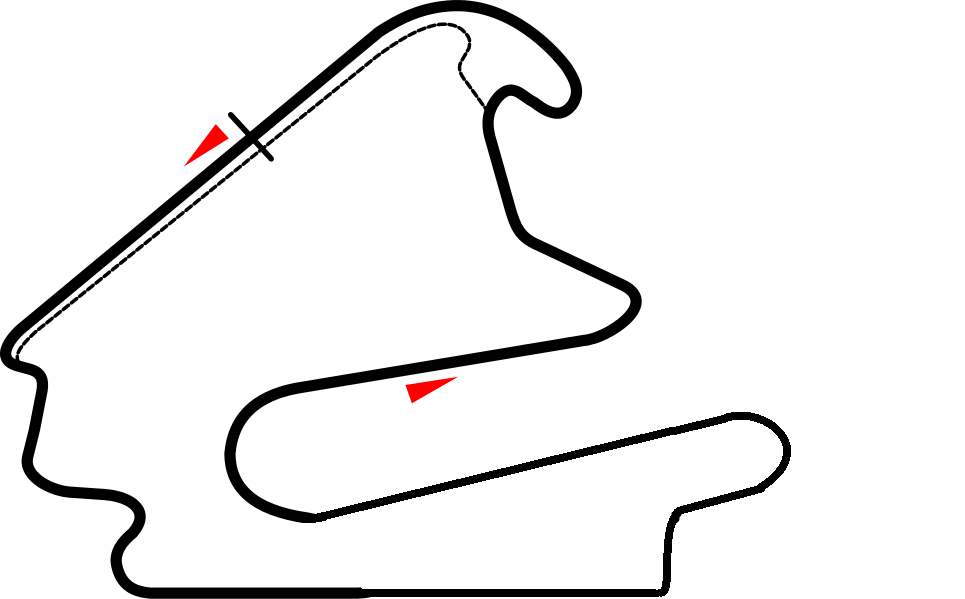
Grand Prix Circuit (2000–present)

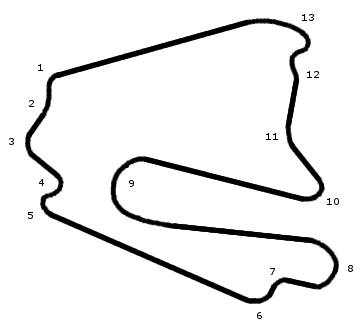
Motorcycle Circuit (2000–present)

Sprint Circuit (2004–present)

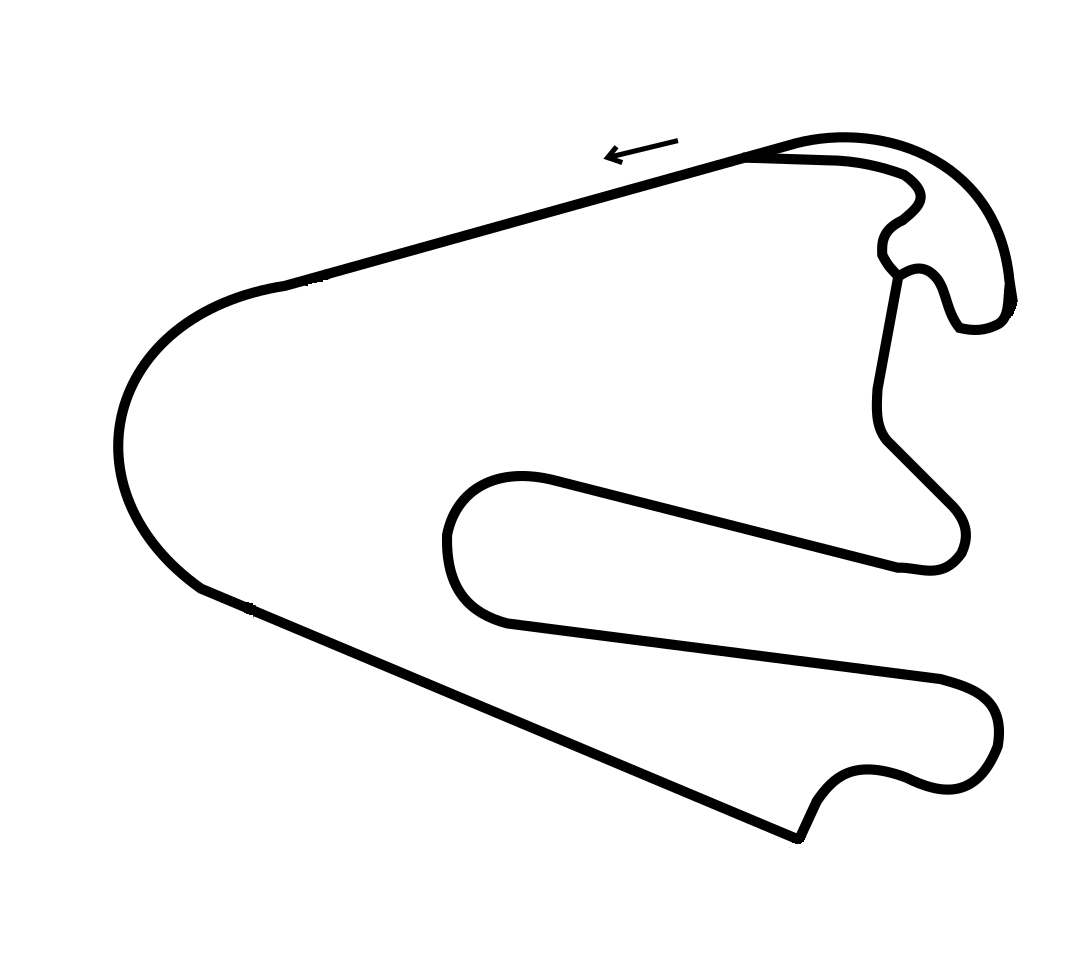
Grand Prix Circuit with Oval Turn 1 (2021–present)

Detailed map of the Lausitzring

== Lap records ==
As of June 2026, the fastest official race lap records at Lausitzring are listed as:

Category	Time	Driver	Vehicle	Event
Grand Prix Circuit (2000–present): 4.345 km (2.700 mi)
EuroBOSS	1:32.059	Scott Mansell	Benetton B197	2004 Lausitzring EuroBOSS round
Formula Nissan	1:32.215	Heikki Kovalainen	Dallara SN01	2004 Lausitzring World Series by Nissan round
A1GP	1:34.736	Nelson Piquet Jr.	Lola A1GP	2005 Lausitzring A1GP round
F3000	1:34.877	Robbie Kerr	Lola B99/50	2005 Lausitzring 3000 Pro round
Formula Three	1:36.854	Markus Winkelhock	Dallara F301	2001 Lausitzring German F3 round
Class 1 Touring Cars	1:37.897	Philipp Eng	BMW M4 Turbo DTM 2019	2019 Lausitzring DTM round
LMP900	1:38.353	Beppe Gabbiani	Dome S101	2003 FIA Sportscar Championship Lausitz
DTM	1:39.395	Marco Wittmann	BMW M4 DTM	2018 Lausitzring DTM round
GT3	1:41.945	Max Hesse	BMW M4 GT3 Evo	2025 Lausitzring GT Cup Series round
LMP675	1:43.082	Mirko Savoldi	Lucchini SR2002	2003 FIA Sportscar Championship Lausitz
Formula Volkswagen	1:43.662	Sven Barth	Reynard Formula Volkswagen	2002 2nd Lausitzring Formula Volkswagen Germany round
GT1 (GTS)	1:43.830	Julian Bailey	Lister Storm GT	2000 FIA GT Lausitzring 500km
Formula Renault 2.0	1:45.303	Reinhard Kofler	Tatuus FR2000	2004 Lausitzring Formula Renault 2000 Germany round
Formula 4	1:46.485	Charles Weerts	Tatuus F4-T014	2018 Lausitzring ADAC F4 round
N-GT	1:48.219	Patrick Huisman	Porsche 911 (996) GT3-R	2000 FIA GT Lausitzring 500km
ADAC Formel Masters	1:48.366	Florian Herzog	Dallara Formulino	2012 Lausitzring ADAC Formel Masters round
Formula BMW	1:48.761	Sebastian Vettel	Mygale FB02	2004 Lausitzring Formula BMW ADAC round
V8Star Series	1:50.105	Thomas Mutsch	V8Star car	2001 2nd Lausitzring V8Star round
GT4	1:55.120	Tim Heinemann	Mercedes-AMG GT4	2020 Lausitzring DTM Trophy round
Porsche Carrera Cup	1:59.394	Leon Köhler	Porsche 911 (991 II) GT3 Cup	2020 Lausitzring Porsche Carrera Cup Germany round
TCR Touring Car	2:10.126	Dominik Fugel	Honda Civic Type R TCR (FK8)	2020 2nd Lausitzring ADAC TCR Germany round
Motorcycle Circuit (2000–present): 4.265 km (2.650 mi)
World SBK	1:36.634	Chaz Davies	Ducati Panigale R	2017 Lausitzring Superbike World SBK round
Formula Three	1:39.852	Philipp Regensperger	Dallara F305	2017 Lausitzring Remus F3 Cup round
World SSP	1:41.035	Niki Tuuli	Yamaha YZF-R6	2016 Lausitzring World SSP round
Supersport 300	1:52.866	Rick Dunnik	Yamaha YZF-R3	2020 Lausitzring IDM Supersport 300 round
250cc	1:52.909	Freddie Heinrich	KTM 250 FRR	2020 Lausitzring Northern Talent Cup round
Grand Prix Circuit with Banked Turn 1 (2021–present): 4.601 km (2.859 mi)
GT3	1:32.085	Maro Engel	Mercedes-AMG GT3 Evo	2022 Lausitzring DTM round
GT4	1:42.039	Thiago Vivacqua	Audi R8 LMS GT4 Evo	2022 Lausitzring DTM Trophy round
Sprint Circuit (2004–present): 3.478 km (2.161 mi)
EuroBOSS/F1	1:13.100	Patrick d'Aubreby	Benetton B192	2005 1st Lausitzring EuroBOSS round
Formula Three	1:15.109	Markus Pommer	Dallara F311	2014 1st Lausitzring German F3 round
Class 1 Touring Cars	1:16.992	Robin Frijns	Audi RS5 Turbo DTM 2020	2020 1st Lausitzring DTM round
DTM	1:17.098	René Rast	Audi RS5 DTM	2017 Lausitzring DTM round
LMP3	1:20.012	Danny Soufi	Ligier JS P320	2025 Lausitzring Prototype Cup Germany round
GT3	1:20.423	Arjun Maini	Ford Mustang GT3 Evo	2026 Lausitzring DTM round
Formula Renault 2.0	1:21.264	Atte Mustonen	Tatuus FR2000	2005 Lausitzring Formula Renault 2.0 Germany round
Formula 4	1:21.759	Robert Shwartzman	Tatuus F4-T014	2015 Lausitzring ADAC F4 round
Porsche Carrera Cup	1:22.857	Chester Kieffer	Porsche 911 (992 II) Cup	2026 Lausitzring Porsche Carrera Cup Germany round
ADAC Formel Masters	1:23.602	Marvin Dienst	Dallara Formulino	2014 Lausitzring ADAC Formel Masters round
Formula BMW	1:24.312	Sébastien Buemi	Mygale FB02	2005 Lausitzring Formula BMW ADAC round
GT4	1:28.559	Denis Bulatov	Mercedes-AMG GT4	2023 Lausitzring ADAC GT4 Germany round
TCR Touring Car	1:29.986	Nico Gruber	Hyundai i30 N TCR	2020 1st Lausitzring ADAC TCR Germany round
Truck racing	1:47.627	Norbert Kiss	MAN TGS	2025 Lausitzring ETRC round
Superspeedway (2000–present): 3.256 km (2.023 mi)
CART	0:34.747	Tony Kanaan	Reynard 01I	2001 American Memorial
Formula Three	0:46.664	Ronny Wechselberger	Dallara F302	2005 Eastside 100
Stock car racing	0:49.026	Ben Collins	Chevrolet Monte Carlo	2003 2nd Lausitzring ASCAR round

== Commercial use ==
=== Test site ===
On 1 November 2017, Dekra acquired the Lausitzring as a test site, especially for autonomous driving. In April 2019 test and verification of communication elements took place on the Lausitzring. Participants were Ford, Samsung, Vodafone, Huawei, LG Electronics and others. Topics were communication matters.

=== Entertainment ===
Dekra organised also an Open-air festival, that took place in May 2019.

=== Television ===
The Lausitzring also appeared in the Top Gear Germany Special where The Stig's German cousin sets laptimes in their £5,000 everyday second-hand sports saloons. Jeremy Clarkson in a Ford Sapphire Sierra RS Cosworth with James May in Mercedes-Benz 190E Cosworth and Richard Hammond in the BMW M3. The trio later filmed a YouTube video where May "got lost" and Hammond "forgot to put the camera on" and Clarkson had a Welsh accent.

== Events ==
Current

- June: Deutsche Tourenwagen Masters, Porsche Carrera Cup Germany, ADAC GT Masters
- September: DMV Goodyear Racing Days

Future

- F4 Germany Championship (2015–2018, 2020, 2022, 2027)

Former

- 3000 Pro Series (2005)
- A1 Grand Prix (2005)
- ADAC GT4 Germany (2020, 2023–2024)
- ADAC TCR Germany Touring Car Championship (2020–2022)
- ASCAR Racing Series (2002–2003)
- Austria Formula 3 Cup (2003–2010, 2012–2013, 2015–2018, 2024)
- Champ Car World Series
  - German 500 (2001, 2003)
- DTM Trophy (2020–2022)
- EuroBOSS Series (2004–2005, 2009)
- European Truck Racing Championship (2001–2002, 2025)
- FIA GT Championship (2000)
- FIA Sportscar Championship (2003)
- Formula BMW ADAC (2000–2007)
- Formula König (2001–2004)
- Formula Renault 2.0 Germany (2001–2005)
- Formula Three Euroseries (2005–2006, 2009)
- Formula Volkswagen Germany (2001–2003)
- Interserie (2001, 2003–2004)
- Northern Talent Cup (2020)
- Prototype Cup Germany (2022, 2024–2025)
- Red Bull Air Race World Championship (2010, 2016–2017)
- Sidecar World Championship (2001–2002)
- Superbike World Championship (2001–2002, 2005–2007, 2016–2017)
- Supersport 300 World Championship (2017)
- Supersport World Championship (2001–2002, 2005–2007, 2016–2017)
- Trofeo Maserati (2003)
- V8Star Series (2001–2003)
- World Series by Nissan (2003–2004)

== See also ==
- AVUS
