= 2002 Formula Volkswagen Germany season =

Seasons
- ← 2001 2003 →

The 2001 Formula Volkswagen Germany supported by ZF Sachs was the second season of the Formula Volkswagen Germany. All drivers competed in Volkswagen powered, Dunlop shod Reynard chassis. For 2002 the cars got an aerodynamic upgrade. Also the race format was changed from one race per weekend to two races per weekend.

== Calendar and results ==
Round	Circuit	Location	Date	Pole position	Fastest lap	Winning driver
1	Lausitzring	Lausitz, Germany	June 15	(Germany) Daniel La Rosa	(Germany) Sven Barth	(Germany) Daniel La Rosa
2	Lausitzring	Lausitz, Germany	June 16		(Germany) Sven Barth	(Germany) Sven Barth
3	Circuit Zolder	Zolder, Belgium	July 6	(Germany) Sven Barth	(Germany) Daniel La Rosa	(Italy) Ronnie Quintarelli
4	Circuit Zolder	Zolder, Belgium	July 7		(Germany) Sven Barth	(Italy) Ronnie Quintarelli
5	Nürburgring	Nürburg, Germany	July 20	(Italy) Ronnie Quintarelli	(Germany) Sven Barth	(Germany) Sven Barth
6	Nürburgring	Nürburg, Germany	July 21		(Italy) Ronnie Quintarelli	(Italy) Ronnie Quintarelli
7	Salzburgring	Salzburg, Austria	August 10	(Austria) Walter Lechner Jr.	(Austria) Walter Lechner Jr.	(Austria) Walter Lechner Jr.
8	Salzburgring	Salzburg, Austria	August 11		(Austria) Walter Lechner Jr.	(Austria) Walter Lechner Jr.
9	Lausitzring	Lausitz, Germany	September 1	(Germany) Sven Barth	(Germany) Sven Barth	(Germany) Sven Barth
10	Lausitzring	Lausitz, Germany	September 2		(Germany) Sven Barth	(Germany) Sven Barth
11	Nürburgring	Nürburg, Germany	September 21	(Germany) Sven Barth	(Finland) Marko Nevalainen	(Italy) Ronnie Quintarelli
12	Nürburgring	Nürburg, Germany	September 22		(Germany) Sven Barth	(Germany) Florian Stoll
13	Motorsport Arena Oschersleben	Oschersleben, Germany	October 12	(Germany) Sven Barth	(Finland) Marko Nevalainen	(Germany) Sven Barth
14	Motorsport Arena Oschersleben	Oschersleben, Germany	October 13		(Germany) Sven Barth	(Germany) Sven Barth

== Final standings ==
Color	Result
Gold	Winner
Silver	2nd place
Bronze	3rd place
Green	4th & 5th place
Light Blue	6th–10th place
Dark Blue	11th place or lower
Purple	Did not finish
Red	Did not qualify (DNQ)
Brown	Withdrawn (Wth)
Black	Disqualified (DSQ)
White	Did not start (DNS)
Blank	Did not participate (DNP)
Blank	Driver replacement (Rpl)
Blank	Injured (Inj)
Blank	No race held (NH)

Rank	Driver	(Germany) LAU	(Germany) LAU	(Belgium) ZOL	(Belgium) ZOL	(Germany) NUR	(Germany) NUR	(Austria) SAL	(Austria) SAL	(Germany) LAU	(Germany) LAU	(Germany) NUR	(Germany) NUR	(Germany) OSC	(Germany) OSC	Points
1	(Germany) Sven Barth	2	1	Ret	4	1	3	Ret	10	1	1	9	3	1	1	288
2	(Italy) Ronnie Quintarelli	8	4	1	1	3	1			2	2	1	2	4	6	265
3	(Germany) Bastian Kolmsee	4	3	Ret	7	2	Ret	4	6	3	3		7	3	3	214
3	(Germany) Florian Stoll	6	6	3	3	8	13	3	13	6		4	1	8		214
5	(Finland) Marko Nevalainen	10	7	2	2	9	8	11	5	7	7	2	4	7	4	205
6	(Germany) Marvin Bylitza	Ret	8	Ret	12	14	4	6	4	4	4	3	5	6	7	185
7	(Luxembourg) Jeff Raach	12	Ret	Ret	8	13	2	8	7	5	5	8		5	5	166
8	(Germany) Daniel La Rosa	1	2	4	5	4	10	10		10						165
9	(Netherlands) Elran Nijenhuis	3	12	Ret	16	6	Ret	5	3	9	6	5			8	148
10	(Belgium) Erik Groes	13	Ret	9	15	10	5	10	2		10		8	10	9	147
11	(Austria) Christian Gratl	7	5	5	6	5	7				9					134
12	(Germany) Stefan Tiesmeyer	5	9	6	9	Ret	11	2	9	8						133
13	(South Africa) Michael Stephen	11	10	8	11	7	Ret	7	12		8					110
14	(Belgium) David Croes	14	12	11	13	Ret	6	14	Ret							101
15	(Switzerland) Iris Thurnherr	15	13	10	14	16	14	13	15							69
16	(Germany) Jarno Unland	16	Ret	7	10	12	Ret									41
17	(Germany) Christian Wolff	9	Ret					9	14							35
18	(Belgium) Joel Schuybroek											10	10			31
19	(Germany) Thomas Mühlenz											7	6		10	29
20	(Germany) André Scheidegger											6	9			27
21	(Italy) Giorgio Sanna	17				11	9	12	Ret							10
21	(Germany) Steffen Wildmann															10
	(Austria) Gottfried Grasser							Ret	11							
	(Austria) Mathias Lauda					15	12									
	(Austria) Walter Lechner Jr.							1	1					2	2	
	(Australia) Rob Nguyen							Ret	8							
