= MSI 20000 =

International banking standard

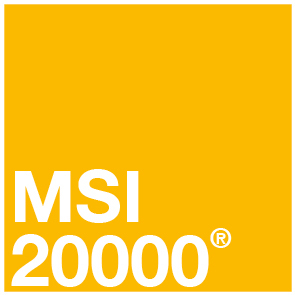
- Status: Active
- Year started: 2007
- First published: 2008
- Latest version: 2016
- Organization: Market Standard International
- Website: www.msi20000.com

MSI 20000 (Market Standard International, index 20000) is an international standard that measures the financial situation of a company or institution. This standard is applicable to all organizations, regardless of their size and business sector. It is mainly used in France, Switzerland, and Germany.

The guidelines are used as a basis for an entity's compliance certification, which falls under the framework of specific financial audits.

The MSI 20000 scope statement's specification provides the requirements in terms of the financial quality of firms, depending on their sector of activity. The statement's specifications focus on two main aspects: financial strength and financial performance.

The MSI 20000 certification provides information on the best administrative and financial management practices and serves as an indicator of good financial governance. The statement serves as a benchmark for various economic and financial actors and operators.

== History ==
The MSI 20000 certification was initially developed, after the subprime crisis in 2008, to identify the healthiest listed companies on stock exchange markets and to minimize the deterioration impact of their stock market crash, during stock market crashes. The desired outcome is to face recurrent market reluctance at major anticipated and announced events (crises, repurchasing, etc.).

== Versions ==
- 2007: Creation of the MSI system; MSI stands for Market Standard Indicator.
- 2008: Creation of the MSI reference system associated with the 20000 index, it is officially named MSI 20000.
- 2009: The scope statement classifies the MSI 20000 as part of the standard family.
- 2016: The internationalization of the MSI system leads to redefining the operating framework of the MSI system and its dedicated certification Origin.

== Concept ==
MSI 20000 is a collaborative project, based on simple operating rules, combining financial and technological skills. The project was conceived by international financial experts, within the MSI Organization, a non-profit NGO based in Switzerland which manages the updating of the statement of standards and its scope of application. The main goal is to provide the market with a reliable, relevant, performing and continuously updated tool.

== Certification ==
To obtain the certification, an audit is carried out in accordance with the scope statement's procedures and specifications. The audits conducted by a certified body accredited by the MSI Organization must be subject to an ongoing monitoring system, in lines with the ISO 17021 standard.

The MSI 20000 scope statement includes a set of ratios, financial instruments and econometric models, related to the sector under study. The set is classified in themes and sub-themes, according to the fundamental principles of solidity and financial performance, ensuring companies: solvency, profitability and sustainability over time. The diagnoses are established according to the strength and performance of these respective themes: management of assets liquidity, liabilities, risks, human resources, operating cycles, etc... commercial, economic and financial profitability, overall net, operational, value creation, etc.

The MSI 20000 approach is based on a supervised scientific and mathematical approach, combining quantitative, qualitative universal and objective indicators. According to the MSI monitoring center, financial quality assessment is based on the intrinsic values of the audited facilities, which takes place after the approval of financial statements by legal auditors. For the sake of reliability and rigor, the analysis tools and the evaluation criteria used are adapted according to the sector of activity, via FinTech tools.

In accordance with certification's regulations, the MSI 20000 certification is valid for three years and can only be issued by an accredited or certified organization.

== International certification providers ==
Aside from the national organizations, there are two international organizations that can deliver the MSI 20000 certification:

- COFICERT (a French company)
- SGS (a Swiss company)
- Dekra (a German company specialising in motor vehicles certification)
