= Jakub Gurecký =

Czech motorcycle racer (2005–2022)

Jakub Gurecky
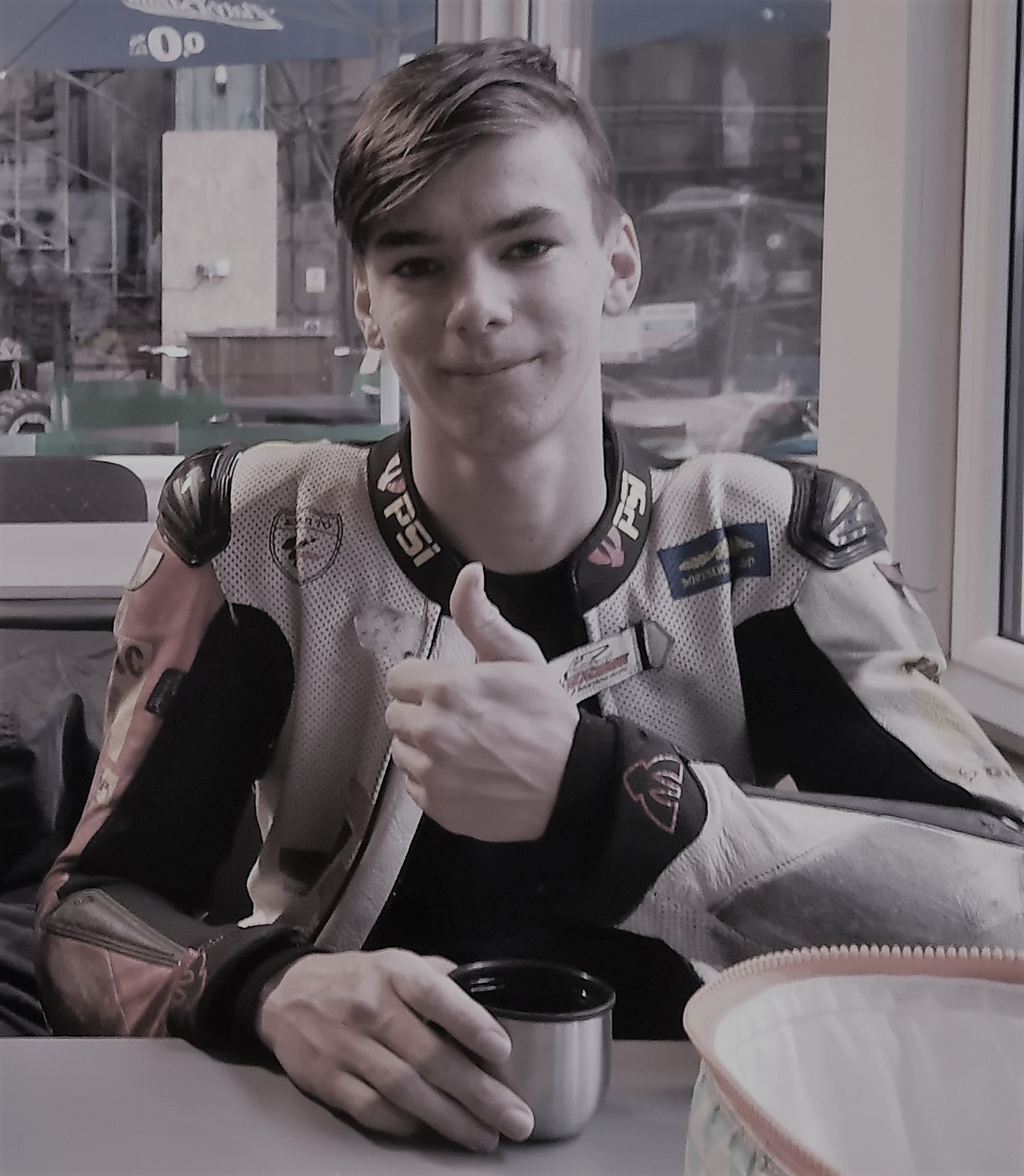
- Nationality: Czech
- Born: 10 August 2005; Zlín, Czech Republic
- Died: 7 February 2022 (aged 16); Martin, Slovakia

Jakub Gurecký (8 October 2005 – 7 February 2022) was a Czech junior motorcycle racer. His home team was Brno circuit junior racing.

== Life and racing career ==
Gurecký was born in Zlín, where he also studied at the local grammar school. He rode motorcycles from the age of 4.

Gurecký started his racing career in 2015 in the ranks of the Minibike Academy of the Masaryk Circuit in Brno and later he competed for the Brno Circuit Junior Racing Team and won the Northern Talent Cup (with a KTM motorcycle). He was the seventh Czech competitor to qualify for the prestigious international Red Bull Rookies Cup doing so for the 2022 edition, however, he died before being able to compete.

During indoor training in Slovakia on 7 February 2022, Gurecký crashed into a solid obstacle and died of his injuries, at the age of 16.
