= Femke Van den Driessche =

Belgian cyclist

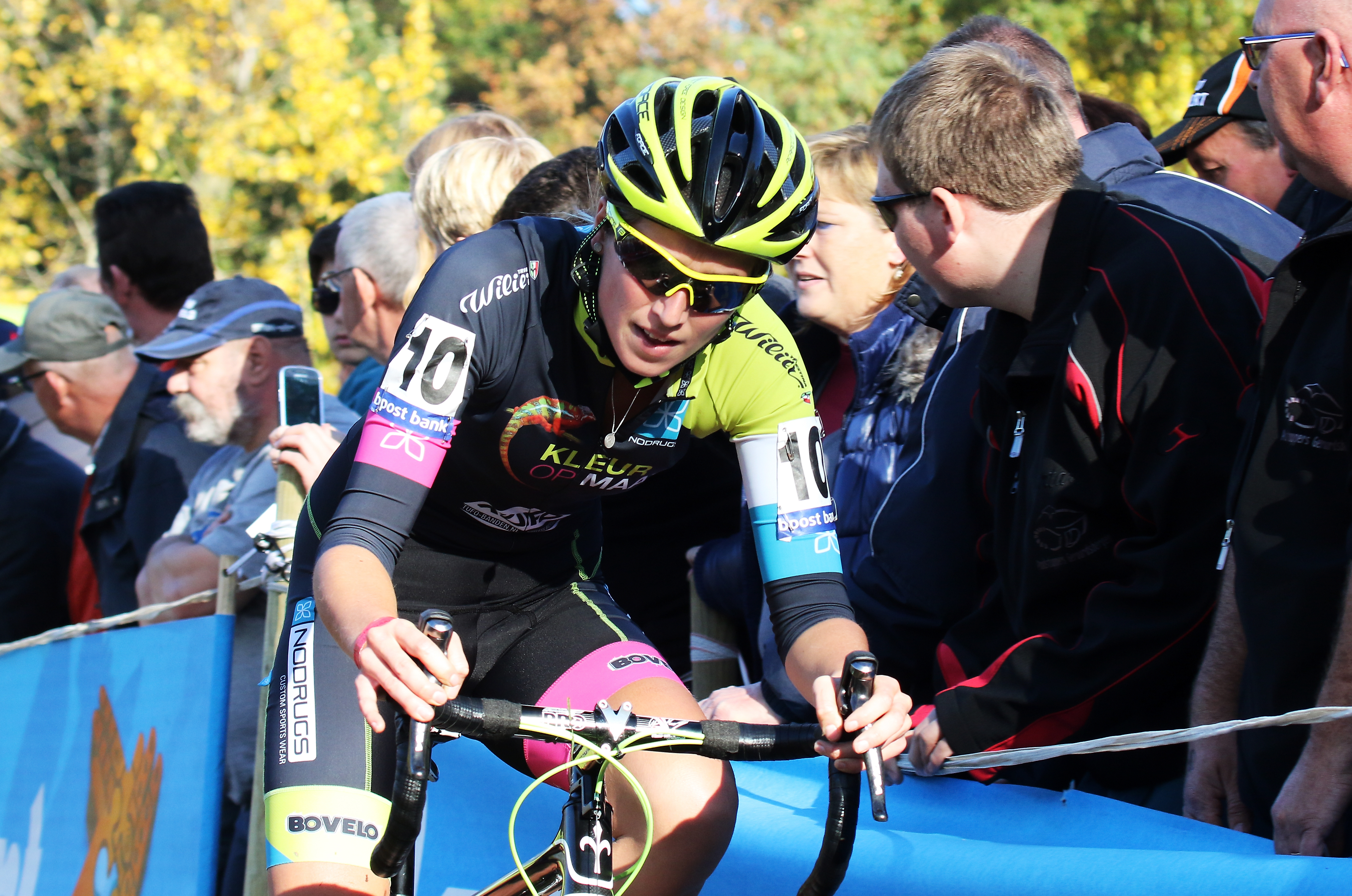
- Femke Van den Driessche in 2015

Personal information
- Born: 27 August 1996 (age 30) Asse, Belgium

Cycling career
- Sport: Cycling
- Current team: Kleur op Maat - Nodrugs
- Disciplines: Cyclo-cross; Mountain bike Road cycling
- Role: Rider

Femke Van den Driessche (pronounced [ˈfɛmkə vɑn dɛn ˈdrisə]; born 27 August 1996) is a Belgian former cyclo-cross cyclist, mountainbiker and road racing cyclist. As a junior, she became national cyclo-cross champion in 2011 and mountain bike champion in 2013. In 2015, Van den Driessche won the European Cyclo-cross Championships in the women's under-23 category, and in 2016 she became Belgian champion in the same category, but she was later stripped of both titles.

She became the first cyclist to officially be charged with mechanical doping, which arose from an incident that occurred at the 2016 UCI Cyclo-cross World Championships. On 26 April 2016, she was retroactively banned from the sport for six years from 11 October 2015 until 10 October 2021, and all her results since that time shall be disqualified. She subsequently retired.

== Career ==
As a junior, she became national cyclo-cross champion in 2011 and junior national mountain bike champion in 2013. At the junior cyclocross championships she won the silver medal in 2013, winning in 2014 the silver medal at the junior national mountain bike championships. She was also active as a road cyclist and won the provincial time trial championships in the novices category in 2012 after finishing second in the same race the year before. In the Middelkerke cyclocross race in February 2015 she finished third behind Sanne Cant and the British rider Helen Wyman.

Between May and July 2015, Van den Driessche competed on the road in international races in Belgium and the Netherlands. She competed in the national road race championships, BeNe Ladies Tour, Diamond Tour and Gooik-Geraardsbergen-Gooik. In the 2015-16 cyclosross season Van den Driessche was beaten at the Koppenberg race by Jolien Verschueren in November 2015. Later that month she won her biggest race in her career, the European Cyclo-cross Championships in the women's under-23 category. In January 2016 she became Belgian cyclocross champion in the same category.

=== Allegations of mechanical doping ===
Van den Driessche started as one of the favorites during the women's under-23 race at the 2016 World Championships, but failed to finish. Her race was interrupted as she had mechanical problems and electrical cables were observed hanging from her bike during a pit stop equipment check.

During the race, the Union Cycliste Internationale (UCI) checked Van den Driessche's bicycles and found a motor in one of them that was in her pit. Almost six years since the first allegations of "mechanical doping" in cycling, this was the first time in cycling history that evidence of technological fraud had been found. The UCI had been testing a new detection system. The offence carries a minimum six-month suspension and a fine of between SFr20,000 and 200,000. Van den Driessche denies she intended to cheat, and maintains that the bicycle was owned by a friend and was taken to the pit in error. In the days following the incident, the friend in question, Nico Van Muylder, told Het Nieuwsblad that the bike was his. However, UCI technical regulation 12.1.013, bars the presence of motors on the bike, regardless of intent or whether the bike was actually used, going to be used or even belonged to anyone on the team. Riders are responsible under strict liability.

In a clip that was later analyzed from the Koppenbergcross cyclo-cross race in November 2015 some unusual movements are seen. At one point she pulls away from the break on a cobble climb, apparently with little effort and still sitting on the saddle while others look laboured. At another point, she misses a couple of pedal strokes as she adjusts her gears, but does not lose much momentum despite being on an incline at the time.

Although neither the authorities nor Van den Driessche have confirmed the power supply or motor, reliable sources have speculated.

=== Reactions to the mechanical doping allegations ===
On 31 January 2016, Brian Cookson of the UCI held a press conference. He said "It is no secret that a motor was found", and characterized the use of the motor as "technological doping", "mechanical doping" and "technological fraud". Her sponsors expressed outrage at her breach of trust, and said that they would start their own legal actions. One cyclocross veteran, Sven Nys expressed shock and disappointment. Managing director Andrea Gastaldello said he was "stunned" by the news that Van den Driessche competed with a concealed motor in her Wilier Triestina bike, "Our company will take legal action against the athlete and against any (person) responsible for this very serious matter to safeguard the reputation and image of the company," he said.

=== Aftermath and end of career ===
On 14 March 2016, Van den Driessche announced she would not defend herself in front of the disciplinary committee on 15 March. She cited the heavy suspension demanded by the prosecution and the prohibitive cost of such a procedure in Switzerland. She said she was being denied the chance of getting a fair trial, as she had already been tried and convicted in the court of public opinion. Van den Driessche also announced her immediate retirement from cycling.

On 26 April 2016, the UCI announced that Van den Driessche had been banned for six years and would forfeit all results since 10 October 2015.

=== Palmarès ===
2011
1st National Junior Cyclo-cross Championship
2nd Oost-Vlaanderen Provincial Time Trial Championship (Novices)

2012
1st Oost-Vlaanderen Provincial Time Trial Championship (Novices)

2013
1st National Junior XC Championship
1st Paal Mountainbike (Novices)
2nd National Junior Cyclo-cross Championship

2014
2nd National Junior XC Championship

Voided results from 11 October 2015

2015
~~1st European under-23 Cyclo-cross Championship~~
~~2nd Koppenberg Cyclo-cross~~
~~3rd Middelkerke Cyclo-cross~~

2016
~~1st National U23 Cyclo-cross Championship~~
