= Mechanical doping =

Cheating in cycling

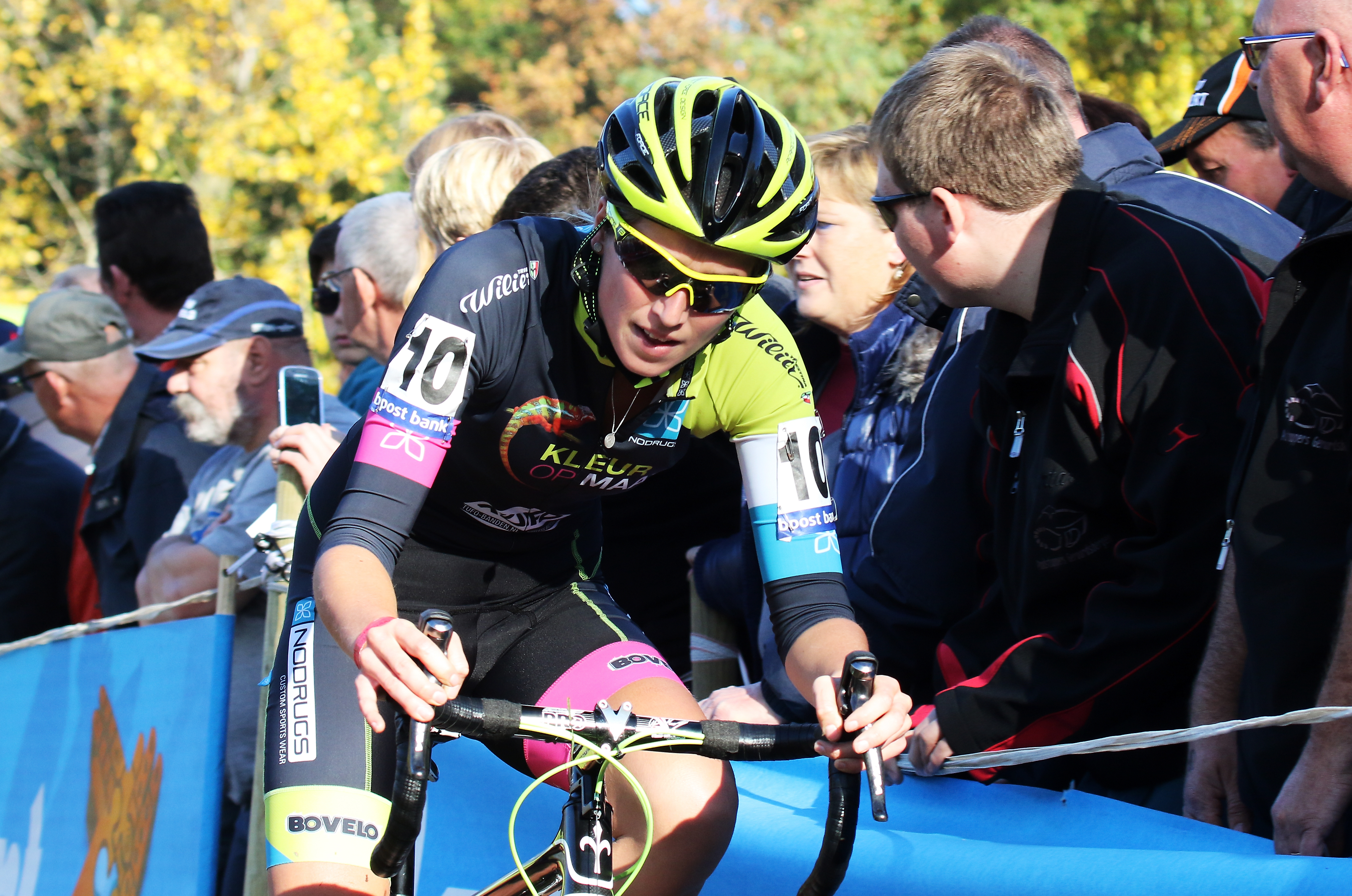
Femke Van den Driessche, the first cyclist to be sanctioned for mechanical doping.

Motor doping, or mechanical doping, in competitive cycling terminology, is a method of cheating by using a hidden motor to help propel a racing bicycle. The term is an analogy to chemical doping in sport, cheating by using performance-enhancing drugs. As a form of "technological fraud" it is banned by the Union Cycliste Internationale, the international governing body of cycling.

== History ==
One of the first allegations of mechanical doping goes back to the 2010 Tour of Flanders when Fabian Cancellara attacked Tom Boonen on a steep part of Kapelmuur whilst unusually seated, leading to allegations that there was an electric motor hidden in Cancellara's bike. Four years later the issue was raised again when Ryder Hesjedal was the subject of allegations of mechanical doping during the 2014 Vuelta a España: Hesjedal crashed on stage seven of the race, and video footage of the crash showed his bicycle's rear wheel continuing to spin after it had fallen onto the road, leading to a number of media outlets including the website of French sports newspaper L'Equipe questioning whether the bike contained a motor, although it was suggested by Cycling Weekly that the bicycle's movement could have simply been due to it sliding on a downward gradient. Public pressure on the UCI led to the race commissaires examining the bikes of Hesjedal's Garmin–Sharp team the following morning: no motors were found. The following spring, checks for bike motors were carried out at Paris–Nice, Milan–San Remo, and the Giro d'Italia.

In January 2016 – almost six years after initial allegations of a pro cyclist doping mechanically – the first confirmed use of "mechanical doping" in the sport was discovered at the 2016 UCI Cyclo-cross World Championships when one of the bikes of Belgian cyclist Femke Van den Driessche was found to have a secret motor inside. One blogger described it as the worst scandal in cycling since the doping scandal that engulfed Lance Armstrong in 2012.

Van den Driessche and her accomplice broke an eight year silence to speak with the podcast series Ghost in the Machine in 2024, revealing that they had experienced death threats, closed down their business and were forced to flee Belgium for their safety. The documentary also highlighted several other alleged cases of mechanical fraud and the UCI's inconsistent and irregular testing systems. The notorious inventor of concealed motors Stefano Varjas was also visited in Budapest. The podcast was recognised as one of the top five podcasts in 2024 by Vulture

Some sources claim that motorized doping has occurred before in professional cycling, but that it has gone undetected or unproven. It is seen as part of a larger effort by athletes in many sports to gain mechanical advantage in competition. In May 2010 former rider Davide Cassani demonstrated a motorised bicycle on the Italian public broadcaster RAI, claiming that similar bikes had been used by some professional cyclists since 2004. The discovery of a motor resulted in a substantial uptick in the level of scrutiny focused on bikes. The UCI has indicated it intends to expend €40,000 to 50,000 to purchase scanning equipment. The UCI has used a tablet with an app that detects disruptions in magnetic fields that are caused by a motor or battery hidden in a bike frame.

== UCI regulations ==
The federation's technological fraud article 12.1.013 fully states:

"Technological fraud is an infringement to article 1.3.010. Technological fraud is materialised by:

"The presence, within or on the margins of a cycling competition, of a bicycle that does not comply with the provisions of article 1.3.010. The use by a rider, within or on the margins of a cycling competition, of a bicycle that does not comply with the provisions of article 1.3.010. All teams must ensure that all their bicycles are in compliance with the provisions of article 1.3.010. Any presence of a bicycle that does not comply with the provisions of article 1.3.010, within or on the margins of a cycling competition, constitutes a technological fraud by the team and the rider. All riders must ensure that any bicycle that they use is in compliance with the provisions of article 1.3.010. Any use by a rider of a bicycle that does not comply with the provisions of article 1.3.010, within or on the margins of a cycling competition, constitutes a technological fraud by the team and the rider.

Any technological fraud shall be sanctioned as follows:

1. Rider: disqualification, suspension of a minimum of six months and a fine of between CHF 20,000 and CHF 200,000.
2. Team: disqualification, suspension of a minimum of six months and a fine of between CHF 100,000 and CHF 1,000,000."

In pertinent part, the technical regulation plainly states:

"The bicycle shall be propelled solely, through a chainset, by the legs (inferior muscular chain) moving in a circular movement, without electric or other assistance."

== Sanctioned athletes ==
Date	Cyclist	Penalty	Event
January 2016	(Belgium) Femke Van den Driessche	6 year ban & CHF 20,000 fine	U23 Cyclo-cross World Championships
March 2017	Unnamed Amateur Cyclist	Disqualified & 5-year ban	French Amateur Road Race
June 2019	Stefano Varjas	Lifetime ban from competitions	Investigation of motor supply to cyclists
September 2020	Roberto Galleti	3-year suspension	Italian Gran Fondo Event
October 2021	Erik Hamish	4-year ban & €15,000 fine	Swiss National Time Trial Championships

== Inspections ==
The UCI says that it has a new device which will reveal the existence of electrical circuitry, armatures, batteries, etc., which are where they are not supposed to be. For the 2016 Tour de France, thermal cameras were used to detect hidden motors. The UCI carried out a total of 10,000 bicycle checks for hidden motors and magnets in 2016, whilst at the 2017 Tour Down Under 132 tests were carried out.

In March 2018, the UCI announced that X-ray cameras would be used in future on Grand Tour stages and classic cycle races, to detect the use of hidden motors.

As of 2024 the magnetic tablet screening process that detected Femke Van den Driessche's hidden motor has also found increasing numbers of amateur riders using concealed motors. However, the UCI president conceded that the screening process is not consistent, and beatable.

== Documentaries ==
French and Italian television have produced documentaries into mechanical fraud, including Stade 2's Thierry Vildary in 2017. CBS, the American broadcaster, aired 60 Minutes Investigation in the same year, alleging that an unnamed Tour de France team bought motors from a Hungarian developer in 1998 for a period of 10 years for US$2m.

The Ghost in the Machine podcast was released in 2024 with seven episodes, then turned into a live investigation.

== See also ==
- List of doping cases in cycling
- Technology doping
