= Dekra =

German vehicle testing organization

Coordinates: 48°43′13″N 9°07′48″E

Dekra SE
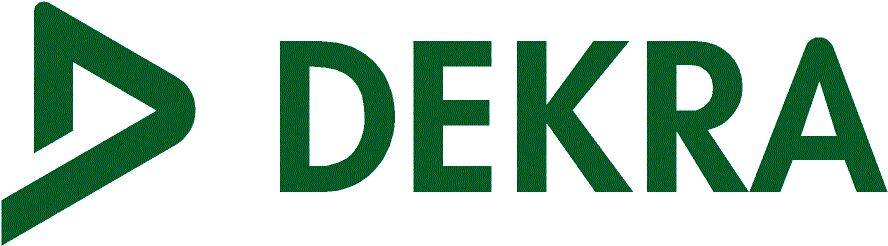
- Type: Societas Europaea
- Founded: 1925
- Headquarters: Stuttgart, Germany
- Key people: Stefan Kölbl Stan Zurkiewicz
- Revenue: €4.29 billion (2024)
- Number of employees: 48,646
- Website: www.dekra.com

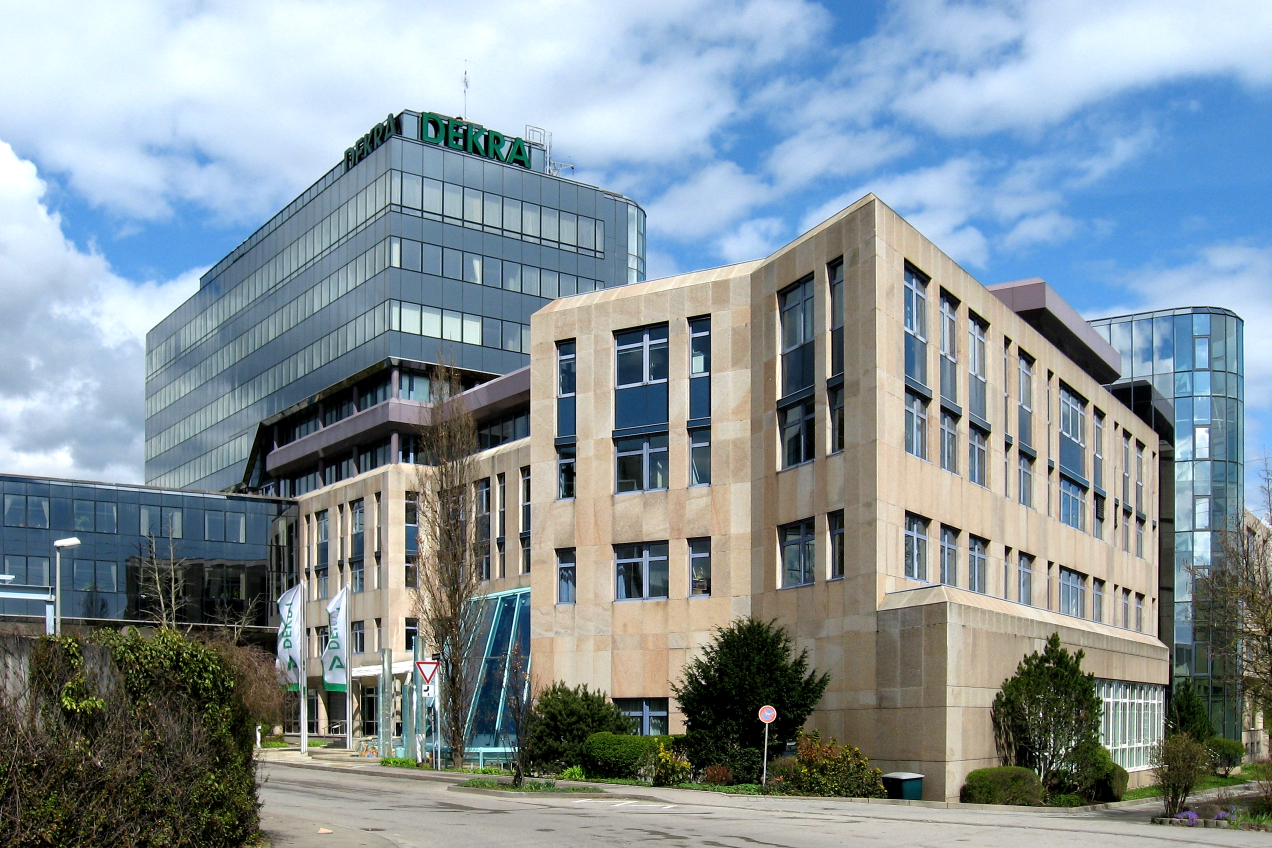
Dekra headquarters in Stuttgart, Germany

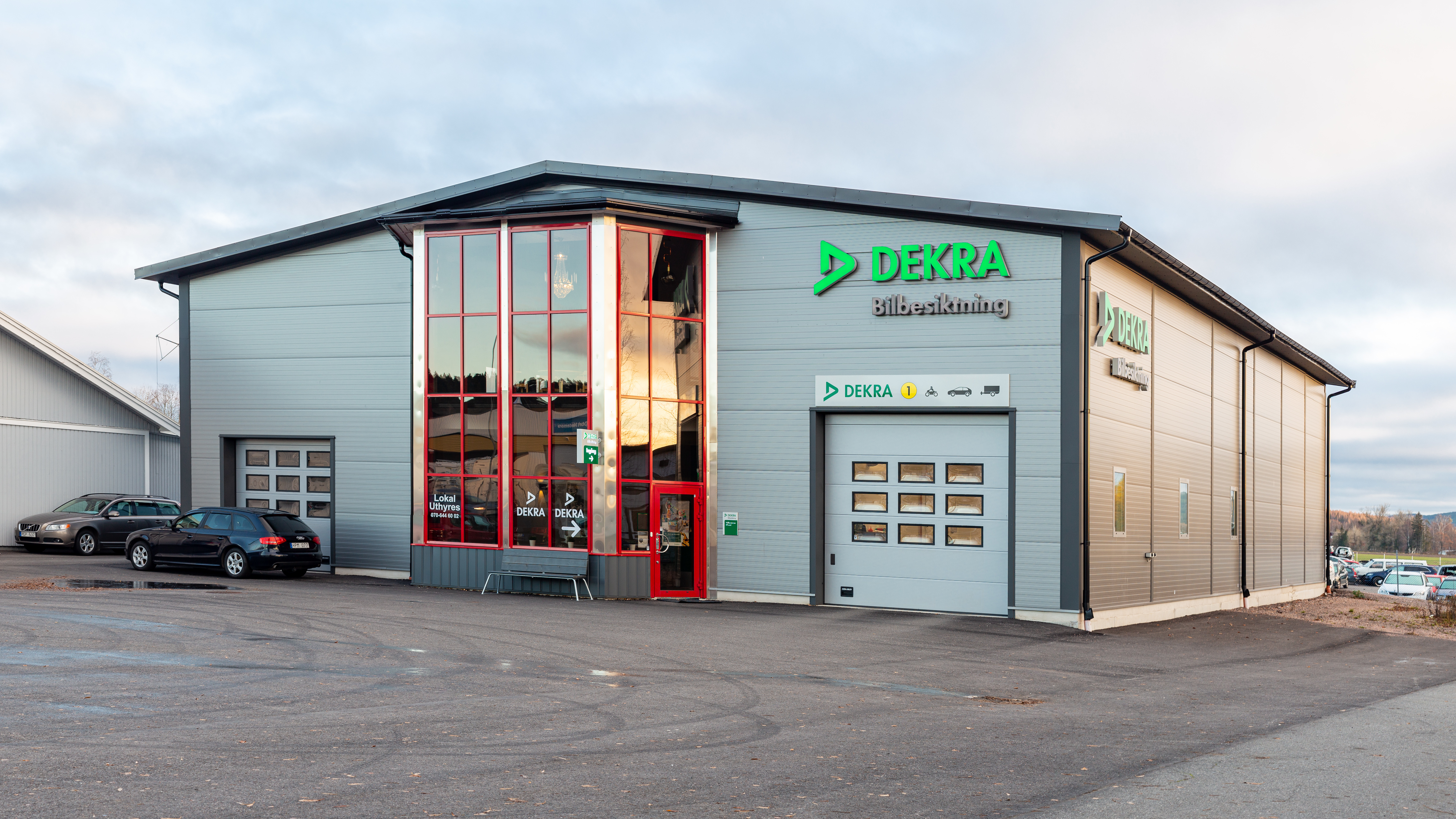
Dekra vehicle inspection facility in Hedemora, Sweden

Dekra (stylised as DEKRA in its logo) is a German professional inspection and expert certification company. Founded in Berlin in 1925 as the Deutscher Kraftfahrzeug-Überwachungs-Verein (German Motor Vehicle Inspection Association), the company is currently headquartered in Stuttgart. With approximately 48,646 employees and a reported revenue of €4.29 billion for 2024, DEKRA is the world’s largest non-listed inspection body and a global market leader in vehicle testing.

Dekra operates 480 branches throughout Germany and carries out regular vehicle inspections at 38,500 inspection sites. The Dekra Academy, which is responsible for initial and in-service training, is represented at 150 locations. According to Dekra's reports for 2024, it achieved sales of €3.8 billion. At the end of 2022, Dekra employed 48,646 people across the company.

On 1 November 2017, Dekra acquired the EuroSpeedway Lausitz as a test site, especially for autonomous driving.

== History ==
Dekra was founded in Berlin in 1925 as Deutscher Kraftfahrzeug-Überwachungs-Verein (German Motor Vehicle Inspection Association). In World War II, the majority of Dekra engineers were drafted into the Wehrmacht (German Armed Forces).

After World War II, former Dekra engineers resumed the company's work in 1946, with Stuttgart becoming the new location of the head office. The introduction of the main vehicle inspection in 1951.

In 1961, Dekra was recognised as an official inspection association. The first Dekra training centre was opened in Wart in 1974. DEKRA AG was founded in 1990 and took over the work of the association. DEKRA ETS was founded in 1991 and took on technical safety, materials testing and construction tasks. DEKRA Umwelt was founded in 1993 in cooperation with the Kölnische Rückversicherung reinsurance company. Further partnerships followed in Eastern Europe beginning in 1993. On 13 July 2010, DEKRA AG was renamed DEKRA SE (Societas Europaea), becoming a European Company.

== Sponsoring ==
Dekra has been a technical partner and sponsor of the touring car racing Deutsche Tourenwagen Meisterschaft Championship from 1989 to 1995, and again from its revival as Deutsche Tourenwagen Masters in 2000. Since 2022, Dekra has also been an official partner of the German Women's Volleyball League. In 1993 and 1994 Dekra sponsored Formula 1 driver Michael Schumacher. Dekra was the official sponsor of the DFB (German Football Association) football referees from 2003 to 2021.
