= Moto4 Northern Cup =

Motorcycle racing competition

- Category: Motorcycle sport
- Region: Central and Northern Europe
- Inaugural season: 2020
- Constructors: Honda
- Riders' champion: (Germany) Robin Siegert
- Official website: Official website

The Moto4 Northern Cup, formerly known as the Northern Talent Cup, is a one-make European motorcycle racing series. It was created to give young riders from Central and Northern European countries a first stepping stone on the road to MotoGP.

The series races on the Honda NSF250R, and uses the European Talent Cup as a blueprint. One of the top riders will have a chance to race in the Red Bull MotoGP Rookies Cup the next year, and at least two will be take part in the Rookies cup selection.

In the inaugural season in 2020, Hungarian rider Soma Görbe won the title, and sixth place German Freddie Heinrich raced in the 2021 Red Bull MotoGP Rookies Cup, and in 2021, Czech rider Jakub Gurecký won the cup, and he and Belgian runner-up Lorenz Luciano were selected for the 2022 Red Bull MotoGP Rookies Cup.

== Motorcycle specifications ==
The series uses the One Make Bike system so that all racers will use the same motorcycle, namely the Honda NSF250R.

Honda NSF250R Technical Data
Dimension	length 1,809 mm x width 560 mm x height 1,307 mm	
Wheelbase	1,219 mm	
Ground clearance	107 mm	
Seat height	729 mm	
Tank capacity	11 liters	
Frame type	Aluminum, twin tube	
Engine type	Liquid cooled 4-stroke engine	
Cylinder arrangement	Single cylinder, inclined 15º from vertical	
Engine displacement	249.3 cc	
Lubricant type	Semi dry sump, forced pressure and wet sump	
Transmission	6 speed	
Clutch type	Wet multi-plate	
Fuel supply system	PGM-FI	
Suspension	Front	Behind
Suspension	Telescopic, inverted type	Swinger, Pro-link
Brake	Front	Behind
Brake	Single disc 296 mm, with 4-piston caliper	Single disc 186 mm, with single piston caliper
Tire size	Front	Behind
Tire size	95/75 R17	115/75 R17

== Winners by season ==
Year	Rider	Pts
2020	(Hungary) Soma Görbe	140
2021	(Czech Republic) Jakub Gurecký	232
2022	(Hungary) Rossi Moor	230
2023	(Germany) Rocco Sessler	243
2024	(Netherlands) Jurrien van Crugten	187
2025	(Germany) Fynn Kratochwil	316
2026	(Germany) Robin Siegert	320
