= Sven Barth =

German racing driver (born 1980)

- Barth in 2024
- Nationality: (Germany) German
- Born: 30 December 1980 (age 45) Weinheim, Germany
- Categorisation: FIA Silver

Championship titles
- 2019 2011 2003 2002: ADAC GT Masters – Trophy; European Sports Car Challenge – Division 1 German Formula Three Championship – Rookie; Formula Volkswagen Germany

Sven Barth (born 30 December 1980 in Weinheim, Baden-Württemberg) is a German racing driver. Best known for his ADAC GT Masters career with Corvette, he has also competed in the Formula Renault 3.5 Series and Prototype Cup Germany.

Rising through the German junior formula ranks, Barth won the 2002 Formula Volkswagen Germany and was runner-up in the 2003 German Formula Three Championship for Franz Wöss Racing. That year, Barth was also signed by German Grand Prix Racing for its up-and-coming Formula One team, but ultimately never drove for the team in any meaningful capacity prior to its disappearance. Ninth in Formula Renault V6 Eurocup then followed in 2004, headlined by a win at Monaco, before a one-off appearance in the Formula Renault 3.5 Series in 2005 brought an end to Barth's single-seater career.

Following sporadic appearances, Barth won the European Sports Car Challenge Division 1 title in 2011, before graduating to ADAC GT Masters with RWT Racing. Sharing a Corvette Z06.R GT3 with David Jahn, Barth took an overall win at the Nürburgring in 2014. After helping Remo Lips to the Trophy crown in 2016, Barth partnered Maximilian Hackländer and Claudia Hürtgen in the new Callaway Corvette C7 GT3-R. A reunion with Jahn yielded seventh in the 2019 standings, as Barth was crowned ADAC GT Masters Pirelli Trophy champion in his final season.

Returning to full-time racing in 2024, Barth drove for Gebhardt Motorsport in Prototype Cup Germany in LMP3. He moved to Aust Motorsport in 2025, and came fourth alongside Maxim Dirickx.

== Racing record ==
=== Racing career summary ===
Season	Series	Team	Races	Wins	Poles	F/Laps	Podiums	Points	Position
2000	Formula König							63	8th
2001	Formula Volkswagen Germany							148	**2nd**
2002	Formula Volkswagen Germany							288	**1st**
2003	German Formula Three Championship	Franz Wöss Racing	16	1	0	0	10	126	**2nd**
2003	Renault Clio Cup Germany							25	20th
2004	Formula Renault V6 Eurocup	Interwetten.com	18	1	0	0	2	126	9th
2005	Formula Renault 3.5 Series	Interwetten.com	1	0	0	0	0	0	37th
2005	German Formula Three Championship	Franz Wöss Racing	2	0	0	0	0	0	21st
2009	V de V Challenge Endurance Moderne – Proto								
2011	European Sports Car Challenge – Division 1								**1st**
2013	ADAC GT Masters	RWT Racing Team	5	0	0	0	0	0	NC
2014	ADAC GT Masters	RWT Racing	13	1	0	1	2	54	17th
2014	Blancpain Sprint Series – Silver	Callaway – RWT	2	0	0	0	0	0	NC†
2015	ADAC GT Masters	RWT Racing Team	14	0	0	0	0	20	27th
2015	24H Series – SP2	RWT Racing Team	1	0	0	0	1	0	NC
2016	ADAC GT Masters	RWT Racing	14	0	0	0	0	5	44th
2016	24H Series – SP2	RWT Racing	2	0	0	0	0	0	NC
2017	ADAC GT Masters	RWT Racing	14	0	0	0	1	19	29th
2018	ADAC GT Masters	RWT Racing	14	0	0	0	0	12	29th
2019	ADAC GT Masters	RWT Racing	14	0	0	0	3	110	7th
2021	Lotus Cup Europe		2	0	0	0	2	35	23rd
2024	Prototype Cup Germany	Gebhardt Motorsport	3	0	0	0	0	99	7th
2024	Prototype Cup Germany	Momo Gebhardt Racing	9	0	0	0	0	99	7th
2025	Prototype Cup Germany	Aust Motorsport	12	0	0	1	6	176	4th
2026–27	Asian Le Mans Cup – LMP3 Pro	GMS							

=== Complete Formula Renault 3.5 Series results ===
(key) (Races in bold indicate pole position; results in italics indicate fastest lap)

Year	Entrant	1	2	3	4	5	6	7	8	9	10	11	12	13	14	15	16	17	DC	Points
2005	Interwetten.com	ZOL; 1	ZOL; 2	MON; 1; 16	VAL; 1	VAL; 2	LMS; 1	LMS; 2	BIL; 1	BIL; 2	OSC; 1	OSC; 2	DON; 1	DON; 2	EST; 1	EST; 2	MNZ; 1	MNZ; 2	37th	0

=== Complete ADAC GT Masters results ===
(key) (Races in bold indicate pole position) (Races in italics indicate fastest lap)

Year	Team	Car	1	2	3	4	5	6	7	8	9	10	11	12	13	14	15	16	DC	Points
2013	RWT Racing Team	Corvette Z06.R GT3	OSC; 1	OSC; 2	SPA; 1	SPA; 2	SAC; 1 Ret	SAC; 2; 16	NÜR; 1; 21	NÜR; 2; 16	RBR; 1	RBR; 2	LAU; 1	LAU; 2	SVK; 1	SVK; 2	HOC; 1 Ret	HOC; 2 DNS	NC	0
2014	RWT Racing	Corvette Z06.R GT3	OSC; 1; 8	OSC; 2 Ret	ZAN; 1; 17	ZAN; 2; 15	LAU; 1	LAU; 2	RBR; 1; 8	RBR; 2 Ret	SLO; 1; 3	SLO; 2; 19	NÜR; 1; 1	NÜR; 2 DNS	SAC; 1; 8	SAC; 2; 14	HOC; 1; 12	HOC; 2 Ret	17th	54
2015	RWT Racing	Corvette Z06.R GT3	OSC; 1; 15	OSC; 2; 10	RBR; 1; 7	RBR; 2; 7	SPA; 1; 10	SPA; 2; 12	LAU; 1; 13	LAU; 2; 11	NÜR; 1 Ret	NÜR; 2; 14	SAC; 1	SAC; 2	ZAN; 1; 12	ZAN; 2; 15	HOC; 1; 13	HOC; 2; 10	27th	20
2016	RWT Racing	Corvette Z06.R GT3	OSC; 1; 30	OSC; 2; 14	SAC; 1; 18	SAC; 2; 27	LAU; 1; 21	LAU; 2 Ret	RBR; 1; 8	RBR; 2; 17	NÜR; 1; 21	NÜR; 2; 26	ZAN; 1; 13	ZAN; 2; 22	HOC; 1; 13	HOC; 2; 10			44th	5
2017	RWT Racing	Corvette C7 GT3-R	OSC; 1; 22	OSC; 2 Ret	LAU; 1; 14	LAU; 2 Ret	RBR; 1; 2	RBR; 2 Ret	ZAN; 1; 15	ZAN; 2; 22	NÜR; 1; 21	NÜR; 2; 15	SAC; 1; 14	SAC; 2 Ret	HOC; 1; 10	HOC; 2; 14			29th	19
2018	RWT Racing	Corvette C7 GT3-R	OSC; 1; 24	OSC; 2; 15	MST; 1; 8	MST; 2; 27	RBR; 1; 31	RBR; 2; 19	NÜR; 1 Ret	NÜR; 2; 19	ZAN; 1 Ret	ZAN; 2; 28	SAC; 1; 19	SAC; 2; 24	HOC; 1; 6	HOC; 2 Ret			29th	12
2019	RWT Racing	Corvette C7 GT3-R	OSC; 1; 8	OSC; 2; 13	MST; 1; 4	MST; 2; 3	RBR; 1; 2	RBR; 2; 8	ZAN; 1; 12	ZAN; 2 Ret	NÜR; 1; 4	NÜR; 2; 22	HOC; 1; 11	HOC; 2; 15	SAC; 1; 7	SAC; 2; 10			7th	110

=== Complete Prototype Cup Germany results ===
(key) (Races in bold indicate pole position) (Races in italics indicate fastest lap)

Year	Team	Car	Engine	1	2	3	4	5	6	7	8	9	10	11	12	13	14	DC	Points
2024	Gebhardt Motorsport	Duqueine M30 - D08	Nissan VK56DE 5.6 L V8	SPA; 1 C	SPA; 2 C	LAU; 1; 7	LAU; 2; 6	LAU; 3; 5										7th	99
2024	Momo Gebhardt Racing	Ginetta G61-LT-P3	Nissan VK56DE 5.6 L V8						ZAN; 1; 7	ZAN; 2; 7	HOC; 1 Ret	HOC; 2; 5	HOC; 3; 8	NÜR; 1 Ret	NÜR; 2; 11	SAC; 1; 4	SAC; 2; 4	7th	99
2025	Aust Motorsport	Ligier JS P320	Nissan VK56DE 5.6 L V8	SPA; 1; 5	SPA; 2; 7	HOC; 1; 5	HOC; 2; 3	LAU; 1; 2	LAU; 2; 2	NOR; 1; 4	NOR; 2; 3	NÜR; 1; 4	NÜR; 2; 5	RBR; 1; 2	RBR; 2; 3			4th	176
