= Dallara Formulino =

Open-wheel formula racing car built by Dallara

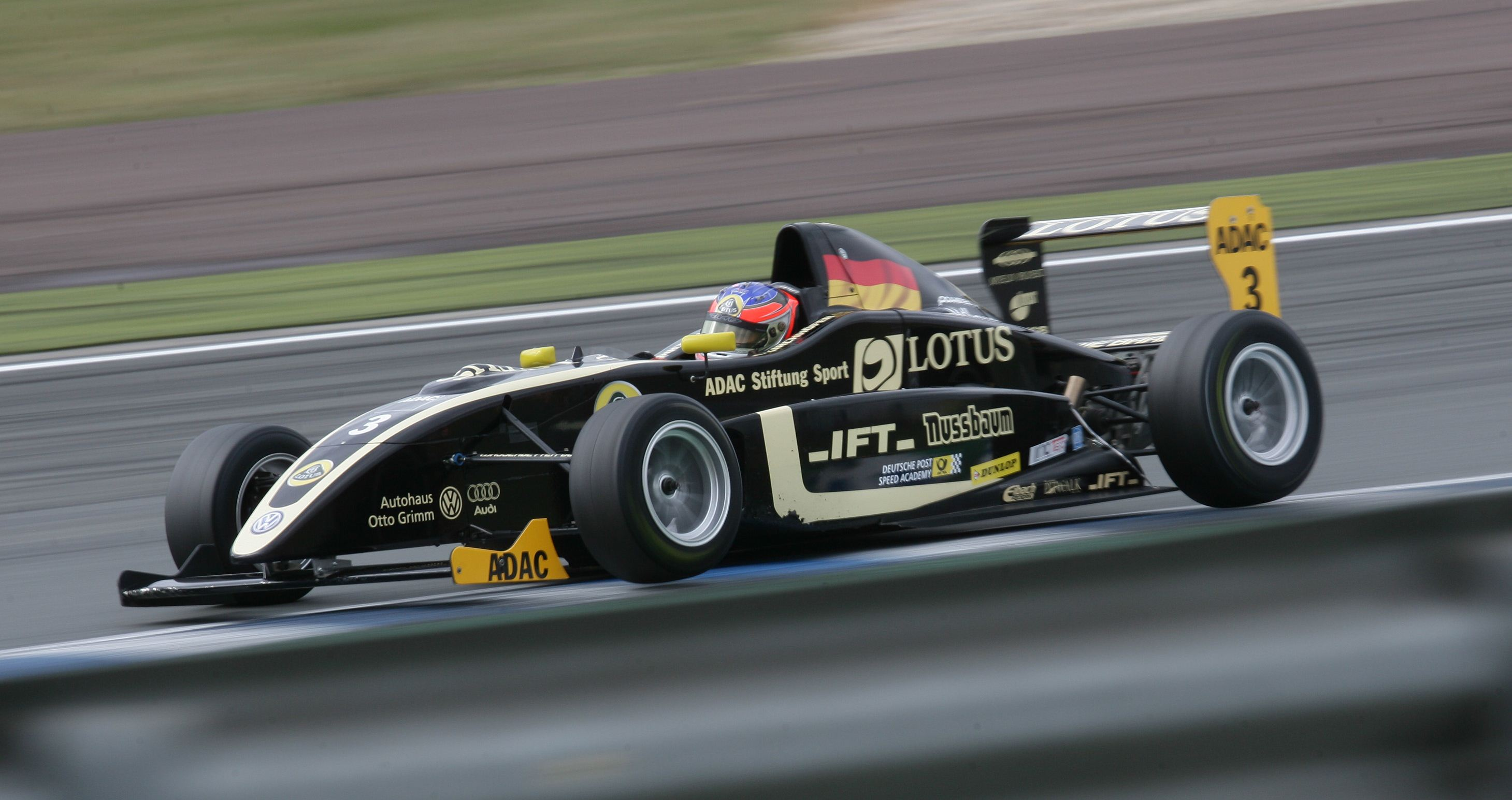
- Category: ADAC Formel Masters
- Constructor: Dallara

Technical specifications
- Chassis: Carbon fiber/kevlar monocoque
- Length: 4,180 mm (165 in)
- Width: 1,750 mm (69 in)
- Height: 1,090 mm (43 in)
- Engine: Mid-engine, longitudinally mounted, 1.6 L (97.6 cu in), Volkswagen FSI, I4, DOHC, NA
- Transmission: Hewland FTR 5-speed sequential manual
- Power: 145 horsepower (108 kW)
- Weight: 490 kg (1,080 lb)
- Tyres: Dunlop

Competition history
- Debut: 2008

The Dallara Formulino is a series of open-wheel formula racing cars, designed, developed and built by Italian manufacturer Dallara, for the German ADAC Formel Masters spec-series, between 2008 and 2014.

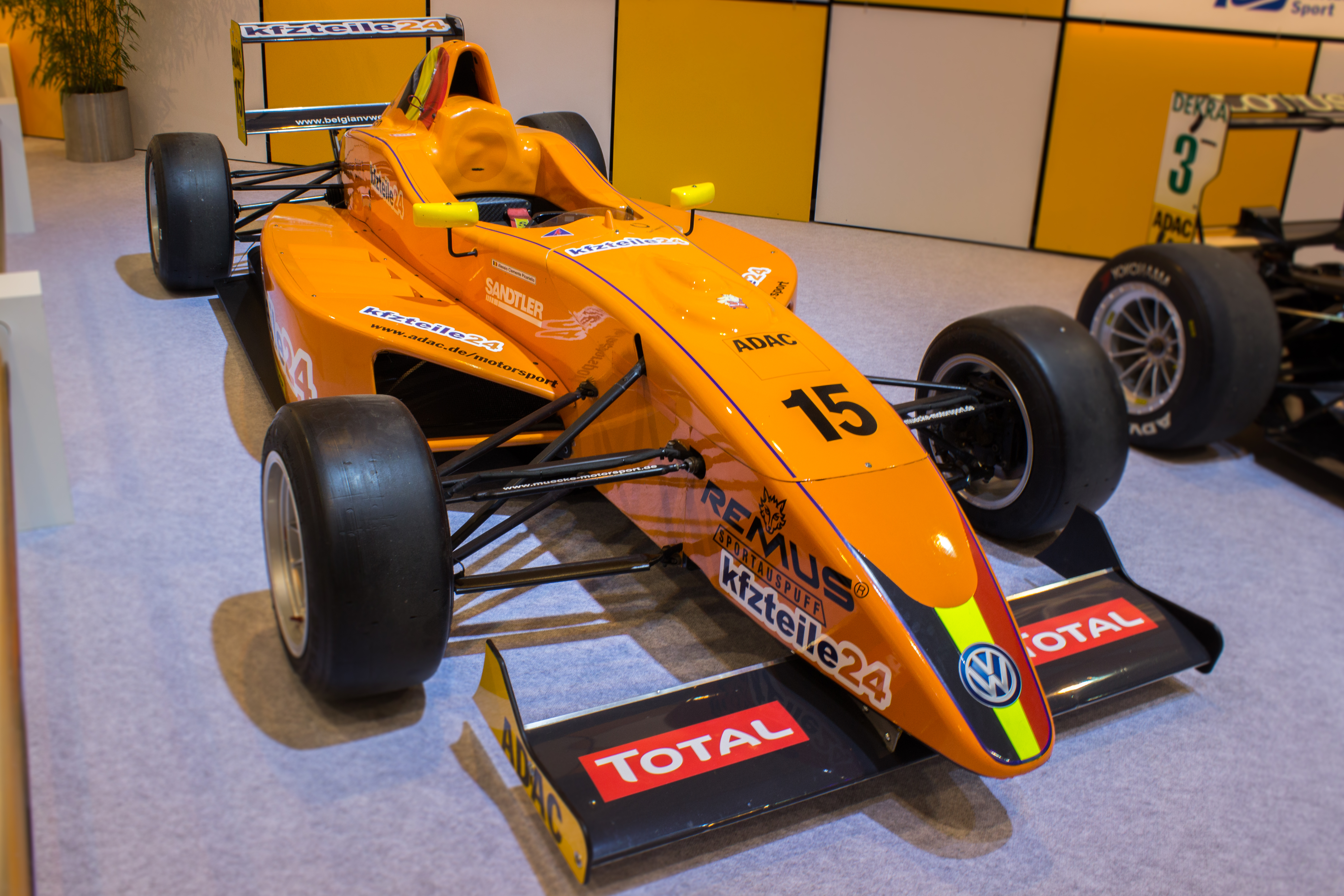

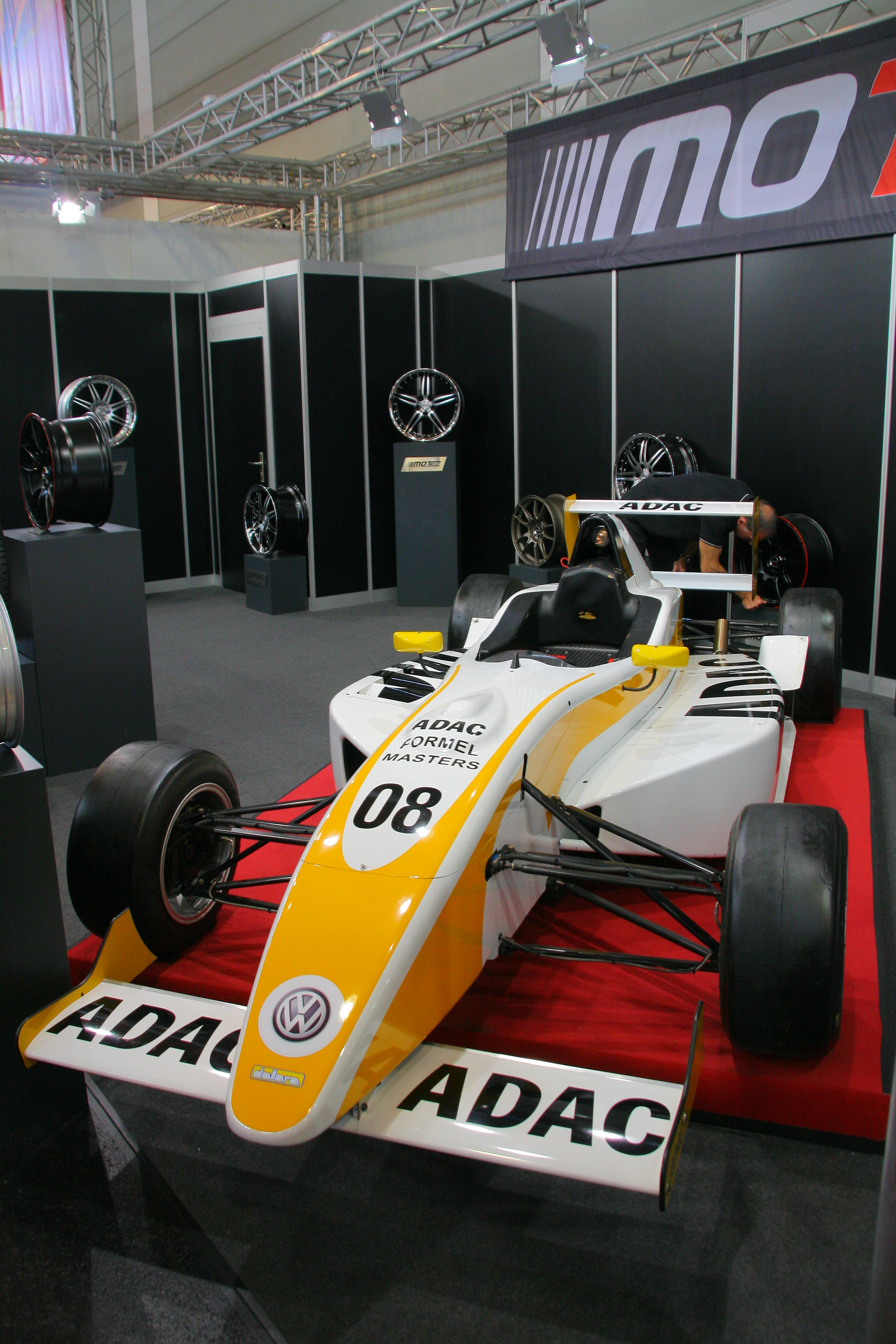
