= Group N-GT =

Motor racing category

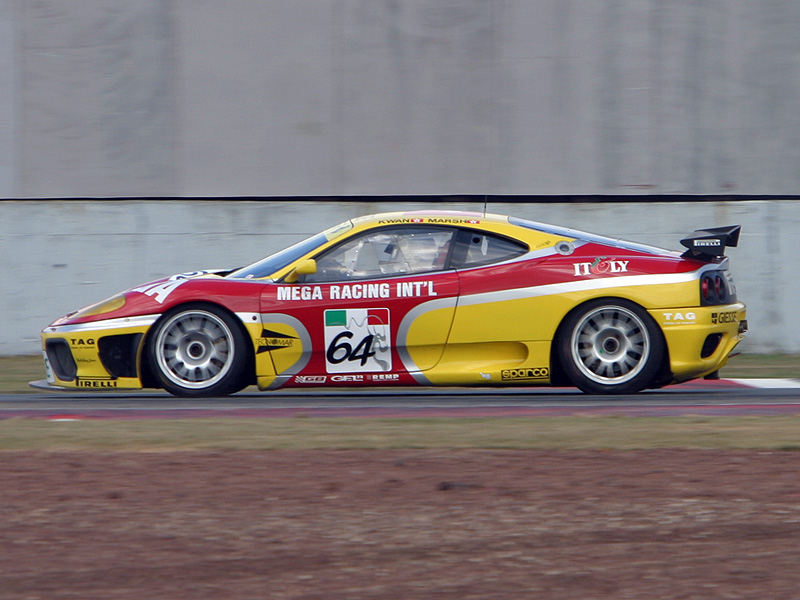
A Ferrari 360 GT shared by Charles Kwan and Matthew Marsh in the 2004 FIA GT Championship.

The Group N-GT (National GT) (also known as Series Grand Touring Cars) was a motor racing category launched by the Fédération Internationale de l'Automobile in 2000. The first cars were homologated on 1 March, 2000 by Porsche and Ferrari. A total of eight different models from six marques were homologated throughout the class existence.

== Technical specifications ==
Appendix J article 257 of the International Sporting Code states the Series Grand Touring Car definition as follows: "An open or closed automobile which has no more than one door on each side and a minimum of two seats situated one on each side of the longitudinal centre line of the car; these two seats must be crossed by the same transversal plane. This car must be adapted for racing on circuits or closed courses." The engine must be fitted with a production based engine with a capacity of up to 8.0L. The restrictor size was determined based on the cylinder capacity and the weight of the car.

== Group N-GT in competition ==
The Group N-GT regulations were used in various GT competitions, mostly as a secondary class to Group GT class cars. An N-GT class was added in the FIA GT Championship between 2000 and 2004. The class was later replaced by Group GT2 regulations. The Euro GT Championship and British GT Championship raced N-GT class cars in the same class alongside Group GT2 class cars and/or Group GT class cars.

=== FIA GT N-GT champions ===
FIA GT Championship				24 Hours of Spa			
Year	Team	Car	Drivers	Year	Team	Car	Drivers
2000	(France) Larbre Compétition Chéreau	Porsche 996 GT3-R	(France) Christophe Bouchut (France) Patrice Goueslard				
2001	(France) JMB Competition	Ferrari 360 Modena	(Italy) Christian Pescatori (France) David Terrien	2001	(Germany) RWS Motorsport	Porsche 996 GT3-RS	(Italy) Luca Riccitelli (Germany) Norman Simon (Austria) Dieter Quester (Spain) Antonio Garcia
2002	(Germany) Freisinger Motorsport	Porsche 996 GT3-RS	(Monaco) Stéphane Ortelli	2002	(Germany) Freisinger Motorsport	Porsche 996 GT3-RS	(France) Romain Dumas (Monaco) Stéphane Ortelli (France) Emmanuel Collard
2003	(Germany) Freisinger Motorsport	Porsche 996 GT3-RS	(Monaco) Stéphane Ortelli (Germany) Marc Lieb	2003	(Germany) Freisinger Motorsport	Porsche 996 GT3-RS	(France) Romain Dumas (Monaco) Stéphane Ortelli (Germany) Marc Lieb
2004	(Germany) Yukos Freisinger Motorsport	Porsche 996 GT3-RSR	(Germany) Lucas Luhr (Germany) Sascha Maassen	2004	(Germany) Yukos Freisinger Motorsport	Porsche 996 GT3-RSR	(France) Romain Dumas (Monaco) Stéphane Ortelli (France) Emmanuel Collard

== FIA homologated Group N-GT cars ==
No.	Marque	Model	Type	Race Model(s)	Developer	Photo	Start	End
N-GT 001	(Italy) Ferrari	360	Modena	N-GT	Michelotto Engineering SpA		March 1, 2000	December 31, 2007
N-GT 001	(Italy) Ferrari	360	Modena	GT	Michelotto Engineering SpA		March 1, 2000	December 31, 2007
N-GT 002	(Germany) Porsche	911	GT3	911 GT3 R (996.I)	Porsche Motorsport		March 1, 2000	December 31, 2011
N-GT 002	(Germany) Porsche	911	GT3	911 GT3 RS (996.I)	Porsche Motorsport		March 1, 2000	December 31, 2011
N-GT 003	(Japan) Mazda	MX-5	NB				August 1, 2002	December 31, 2012
N-GT 004	(Italy) Maserati	Coupé	Trofeo	Trofeo Light	Italtechnica		March 1, 2003	December 31, 2012
N-GT 005	(Japan) Nissan	Fairlady Z	Z33		RJN Motorsport		March 1, 2003	December 31, 2016
N-GT 006	(United Kingdom) Morgan	Aero 8		GTN			July 1, 2003	December 31, 2010
N-GT 007	(Italy) Ferrari	360	Challenge Stradale	GTC	Michelotto Engineering SpA		March 1, 2004	December 31, 2011
N-GT 008	(Germany) Porsche	911	GT3 RS	911 GT3 RSR (996.II)	Porsche Motorsport		March 1, 2004	December 31, 2013
