= Formula Volkswagen Germany =

Motor racing category

Formula Volkswagen
- Category: Spec racing single seaters
- Country: Germany
- Inaugural season: 2001
- Folded: 2003
- Constructors: Reynard
- Engine suppliers: Volkswagen
- Tyre suppliers: Dunlop
- Last Drivers' champion: (Netherlands) Jaap van Lagen
- Last Teams' champion: (Austria) WT Motorsport

The Formula Volkswagen Germany was a short-lived single-seater category in Germany between 2001 and 2003.

== History ==
The Formula Volkswagen was launched in 2000 as the new Formula Vee by Volkswagen Motorsport. Reynard Motorsports constructed the chassis while the engine was derived from the Volkswagen Formula 3 engine. The initial race was run at the Salzburgring on 10 June 2001. The race was won by Belgian youngster Philip Cloostermans. Cloostermans finished second in the standings of the first season, behind Walter Lechner Jr.. The following season an updated Formula Volkswagen chassis was presented. The new car had aerodynamic updates to more resemble the dimensions of a Formula 3 car. The racing format was also different for the 2002 season. Instead of one race each weekend, there were now two. The series struggled to attract more than fifteen competitors each weekend. Jaap van Lagen won the final season of the Formula Volkswagen in 2003.

== Champions ==
Year	Driver	Team
2001	(Austria) Walter Lechner Jr.	(Austria) Walter Lechner Racing School
2002	(Germany) Sven Barth	(Germany) Interwetten Racing
2003	(Netherlands) Jaap van Lagen	(Austria) WT Motorsport
