= Red Bull Ring =

Motor racing track in Austria

- Configuration for automobile racing (2016–present)

- Configuration for motorbike racing (2022–present)
- Location: Spielberg, Styria, Austria
- Coordinates: 47°13′11″N 14°45′53″E
- Capacity: 105,000
- FIA Grade: 1 (Grand Prix); 2 (Motorcycle & Südschleife)
- Owner: Dietrich Mateschitz Beteiligungs GmbH (2004–present)
- Operator: Projekt Spielberg GmbH & Co KG (2011–present)
- Opened: 26 July 1969; 57 years ago Re-opened: 15 May 2011; 15 years ago
- Closed: 2004; 22 years ago
- Former names: A1-Ring (1996–2004); Steiermark Österreichring (1986–1995); Österreichring (1969–1985)
- Major events: Current: Formula One; Austrian Grand Prix (1970–1987, 1997–2003, 2014–present); Grand Prix motorcycle racing Austrian motorcycle Grand Prix (1996–1997, 2016–present); DTM (2001–2003, 2011–2018, 2021–present); Ferrari Challenge Europe (2003, 2011, 2019, 2021, 2023, 2026); Future: TCR Europe (2019, 2025, 2027); Former: Formula One; Styrian Grand Prix (2020–2021); Grand Prix motorcycle racing Styrian motorcycle Grand Prix (2020–2021); 4 Hours of Red Bull Ring (1969–1976, 1997–1998, 2000–2001, 2013–2018, 2021); World SBK (1988–1994, 1997–1999); FIM EWC (1980–1987)
- Website: (in German); (in English)

Red Bull Ring Grand Prix Circuit (2025–present) (Note: A1-Ring (1996–2004), Red Bull Ring (2011–July 2016), Red Bull Ring (August 2016–2024) and Red Bull Ring (2025–present) has the same circuit configuration although additional turn (total: 10) has been counted therefore length had been changed or the measurement of circuit distance has changed.)
- Length: 4.326 km (2.688 mi)
- Turns: 10
- Race lap record: 1:07.924 ( (Australia) Oscar Piastri, McLaren MCL39, 2025, F1)

Red Bull Ring Motorcycle Circuit (2022–present)
- Length: 4.348 km (2.702 mi)
- Turns: 10
- Race lap record: 1:29.519 ( (Italy) Francesco Bagnaia, Ducati Desmosedici GP24, 2024, MotoGP)

Südschleife National Circuit (1996–present)
- Length: 2.336 km (1.452 mi)
- Turns: 5
- Race lap record: 0:48.120 ( (Germany) Andreas Fiedler, PRC WPR60 Turbo, 2014, CN)

Red Bull Ring Grand Prix Circuit (August 2016–2024)
- Length: 4.318 km (2.683 mi)
- Turns: 10
- Race lap record: 1:05.619 ( (Spain) Carlos Sainz Jr., McLaren MCL35, 2020, F1)

Red Bull Ring (2011–July 2016) A1-Ring (1996–2004)
- Length: 4.326 km (2.688 mi)
- Turns: 9
- Race lap record: 1:08.337 ( (Germany) Michael Schumacher, Ferrari F2003-GA, 2003, F1)

Nordschleife Club Circuit (1996–2004)
- Turns: 5

Österreichring (Bosch Kurve modified) (1988–1995)
- Length: 5.852 km (3.636 mi)
- Turns: 18
- Race lap record: 1:31.228 ( (Germany) Manuel Reuter, Porsche 962C, 1993, Group C)

Österreichring (with Hella Licht chicane) (1977–1987)
- Length: 5.941 km (3.692 mi)
- Turns: 18
- Race lap record: 1:28.318 ( (United Kingdom) Nigel Mansell, Williams FW11B, 1987, F1)

Österreichring (Original Circuit) (1969–1976)
- Length: 5.911 km (3.673 mi)
- Turns: 16
- Race lap record: 1:35.810 ( (Belgium) Jacky Ickx, Alfa Romeo 33/TT/12, 1974, Group 5)

The Red Bull Ring is a 4.326 km (2.688 mi) motorsport race track in Spielberg, Styria, Austria. The race circuit was founded as Österreichring (transl. Austrian Circuit) and hosted the Austrian Grand Prix for 18 consecutive years, from 1970 to 1987. It was later shortened, rebuilt and renamed the A1-Ring (German: A Eins-Ring), and it hosted the Austrian Grand Prix again from 1997 to 2003.

When Formula One outgrew the circuit, a plan was drawn up to extend the layout. Parts of the circuit, including the pits and main grandstand, were demolished, but construction work was stopped and the circuit remained unusable for several years before it was purchased by Red Bull's Dietrich Mateschitz and rebuilt. Renamed the Red Bull Ring, the track was reopened on 15 May 2011, and subsequently hosted a round of the 2011 DTM season and a round of the 2011 F2 championship. Formula One returned to the circuit in the 2014 season, and MotoGP returned to the circuit in the 2016 season. The Red Bull Ring also hosted a second F1 event named the Styrian Grand Prix in 2020 and 2021; and a second MotoGP event named the Styrian motorcycle Grand Prix in 2020 and 2021 after the COVID-19 pandemic affected the schedules of both of those seasons.

== History ==
=== Österreichring (1969–1995) ===
"At Zeltweg, down the long straight to the Bosch Kurve, the car was throwing out 1400 bhp and just kept on pushing – you felt like you were sitting on a rocket."

— Gerhard Berger (speaking in 2007) on the turbocharged Benetton-BMW he drove in F1 in the 1986 season.

Österreichring track layout from 1977 to 1995, with Hella-Licht chicane. The corner lined in gray, "Hella-Licht Kurve", was used on the circuit's original configuration from 1969 to 1976.

Originally built in 1969 to replace the bland and bumpy Zeltweg Airfield circuit located just across the expressway, the Österreichring track was situated in the Styrian mountains and it was a visually spectacular and scenic circuit. Although narrow at 10 m (11 yd) in all places, the track was very fast, every corner was a fast sweeper and was taken in no lower than third gear in a five-speed gearbox and fourth in a six-speed gearbox. It had noticeable changes in elevation during the course of a lap, 65 m (213 ft) from lowest to highest point. Like most fast circuits it was a circuit hard on engines but more difficult on tyres, because of the speeds being so consistently high. Many considered the Österreichring to be dangerous, especially the Bosch Kurve, a 180-degree banked downhill right-hand corner with almost no run-off area which, by 1986 when turbos pushed Formula One engine power to upwards of 1,400 bhp (1,044 kW; 1,419 PS) in qualifying, saw Derek Warwick speed trapped at 344 km/h (214 mph) in his BMW powered Brabham BT55 on the run to the Bosch Kurve. There were other testing corners such as Voest-Hugel, which was a flat-out 290 km/h (180 mph) right-hander that eventually led to the 240 km/h (150 mph) Sebring-Auspuff Kurve (this corner had many names over the years, Dr. Tiroch and Glatz Kurve were others) which was an essential corner to get right because of the long straight afterwards that led to the Bosch Kurve.

Some of the track was just road with little to no protection at all, even up to the final Austrian Grand Prix there in 1987, a race that had to be restarted twice because of two progressively more serious accidents both caused by the narrow pit straight in a similar manner to the 1985 race when the race was stopped after one lap following a start line shunt that had taken out three cars including championship leader Michele Alboreto's Ferrari and local driver Gerhard Berger's Arrows-BMW. In practice for the 1987 race McLaren's Stefan Johansson narrowly avoided serious injury or worse when at over 240 km/h (150 mph) he collided with a deer that had made its way onto the track while Johansson was cresting a blind brow before the Jochen Rindt Kurve behind the pits.

Increasing speeds were also a concern at the Österreichring; during the final Grand Prix there in 1987 pole-sitter Nelson Piquet's time for the 5.942 km (3.692 mi) of 1:23.357 set an average speed record for the circuit of 256.621 km/h (159.457 mph). At the time it was second only in F1 average speed to Keke Rosberg's 258.9 km/h (160.9 mph) pole lap of the Silverstone Circuit set during the 1985 British Grand Prix. Both times were set using a turbocharged Williams-Honda.

American driver Mark Donohue died after crashing at the Hella-Licht Kurve in 1975. In 1976, the Hella-Licht Kurve was tightened and made into one right-hander rather than two right-handers with a small section between, and in 1977 it was slowed down and became the Hella-Licht chicane, going from the fastest to the slowest corner on the track. It is also known that four-time World Champion Alain Prost often said that all tracks can be changed but that the Österreichring should remain unchanged, just adding run-off areas would be fine, which eventually did happen up until the original track's final year in 1995. The track was known for having many crashes at the start of races (especially with the 2.15 m (7.05 ft) Formula One's cars wide at the time, until 1992) because the start-finish straight was very narrow (about 10 m (33 ft) wide), while most start–finish straights on other tracks were 12 to 15 m (40 to 50 ft) and it did not provide enough space for cars attempting to pass others, especially cars that stalled or broke at the start. Motorcycle rider Hans-Peter Klampfer died after a collision with another rider at the Bosch Kurve (where most fatalities happened) and 29-year-old Hannes Wustinger was also killed after a crash at the Tiroch Kurve (the part that was left out of the present circuit) at a race for the Austrian Touring car championship and this sealed the decision to build a new circuit.

Triple World Champion and long-time hero of the home crowd Niki Lauda is the only Austrian driver to win his home Grand Prix. He won the 1984 Austrian Grand Prix at the Österreichring driving a McLaren-TAG Porsche. Lauda went on to win his third and final championship in 1984, beating his teammate Alain Prost by the smallest margin in F1 history, only half a point. He announced his permanent retirement from driving at the circuit before the 1985 race.

=== A1-Ring (1996–2003) ===
The Österreichring's safety concerns had reached a head in the mid-1990s, and in 1995 and 1996 it was totally rebuilt, at the same site, by Hermann Tilke. Its length was shortened from 5.942 to 4.326 km (3.692 to 2.688 mi), and the fast sweeping corners were replaced by three tight right-handers, in order to create overtaking opportunities. Its three long straights, as well as a twisty infield section, asked for a setup compromise.

As much of the construction work was paid for by the mobile phone provider A1, the track was renamed the A1-Ring. It proceeded to host seven Formula One Austrian Grands Prix between 1997 and 2003, as well as several DTM races and the Austrian motorcycle Grand Prix in 1996 and 1997.

=== Red Bull Ring (2011–present) ===
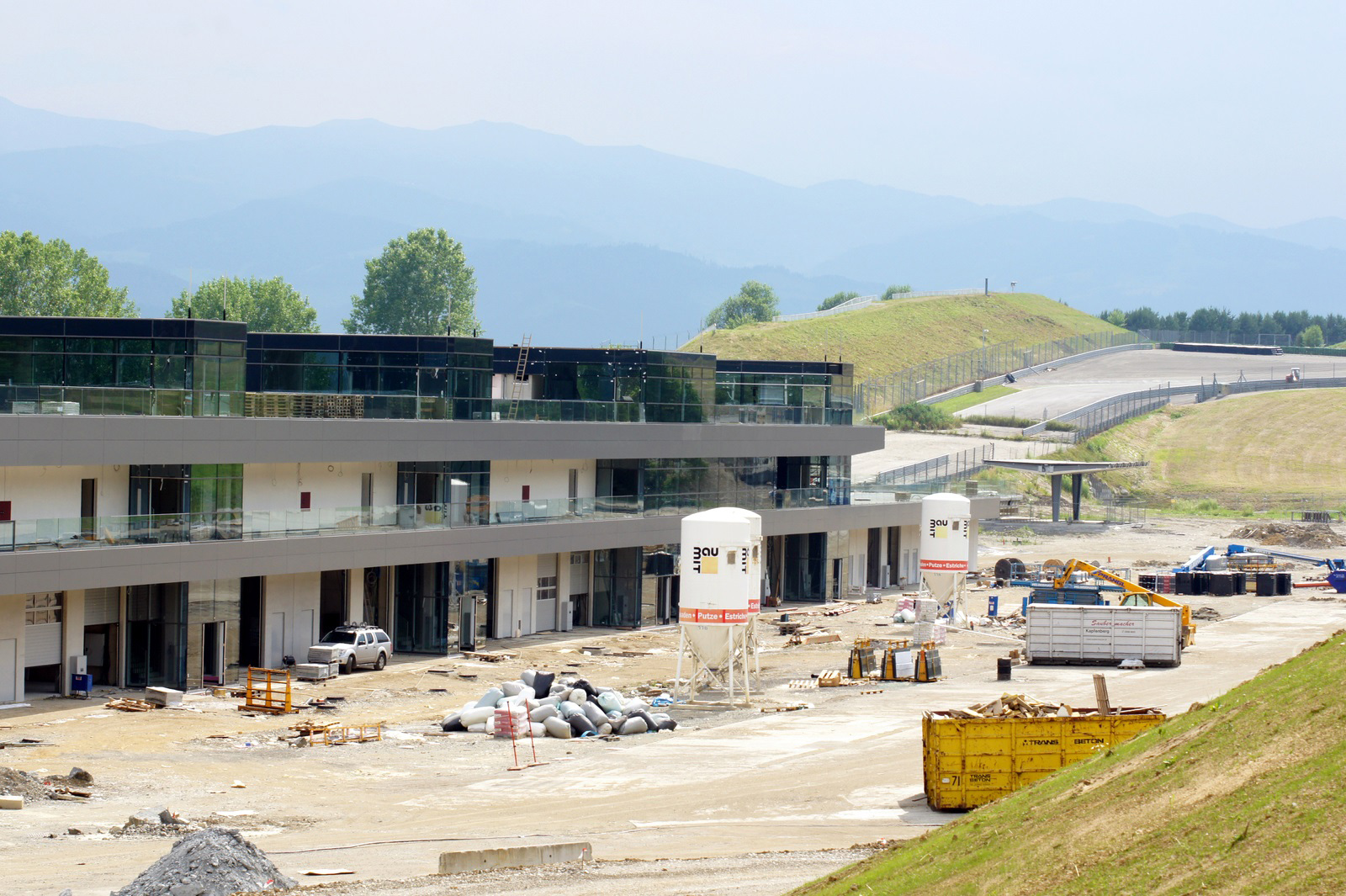
Reconstruction of Red Bull Ring pitlane buildings in 2010

After the contract termination of Austrian Grand Prix, the circuit was sold to Dietrich Mateschitz in 2004. The grandstands and pit buildings were demolished in 2004, rendering the track unusable for any motorsport category.

In late 2004 and early 2005, there were intense discussions concerning whether the owner of the circuit, Red Bull, would find another use for the site, or return motorsports to the venue. There was a circuit extension proposal using part of the old Österreichring. In January 2005, return of motorsports seemed more unlikely than ever, as Dietrich Mateschitz publicly announced that he had no intention of wasting money on a deficient circuit. Throughout 2005 however, there was speculation of the newly founded Red Bull Racing renovating the track to use it as a test venue.

In 2006, Austrian racing driver Alexander Wurz claimed he would buy the circuit and have it renovated, but the idea never came to fruition. By 2007, talks involving Red Bull, KTM, Volkswagen and Magna International for a neuer Österreichring failed, after VW pulled out.

Late in 2008, Red Bull began their €70m reconstruction of the track and DTM chiefs considered a return to the circuit in 2009, and in September 2010, it was confirmed that the circuit, now known as the Red Bull Ring, would host a round of the 2011 DTM season. The championship has visited the circuit every year since then until 2018.

In November 2010, F2 announced that Round 6 of the 2011 F2 championship would take place at the Red Bull Ring. The circuit was reopened at a special event over the weekend of 15–16 May 2011, which included displays of various Red Bull-sponsored teams including Red Bull Racing. The FIA Historic Formula One Championship was invited to provide the headline race attraction with a race on each day for Formula One cars from the 3-litre period.

In December 2012, Red Bull contacted the FIA to say the track would be available to host a round of the Formula One World Championship in 2013, after a slot became available following the postponement of the proposed New York metropolitan area Grand Prix of America, and by July 2013, Red Bull announced that the Austrian Grand Prix would return as a round of the Formula One World Championship in 2014. The Austrian Grand Prix was held on 22 June 2014.

From 2014 until 2016, the track also hosted a round of the Red Bull Air Race World Championship.

On 11 February 2016, it was announced that MotoGP would return to the circuit in 2016 for the first time since 1997.

On 30 June 2019, in honour of the late 3-time Formula One World Champion Niki Lauda, the first turn of the track was renamed the "Niki Lauda Turn".

On 30 May 2020, it was reported that the Austrian government had given permission for two Formula One races to be held on 5 and 12 July 2020 respectively to kick off the 2020 Formula One season after its start had been delayed by the COVID-19 pandemic.

On 2 June 2020, Formula One confirmed the Red Bull Ring would hold back to back races on 5 and 12 July to start the 2020 season, with the second race styled as a one-off Styrian Grand Prix. It would also hold the first four races of the 2020 FIA Formula 2 Championship and the 2020 FIA Formula 3 Championship. This made it the first European circuit to host the opening round of a Formula One season since the Circuit de Monaco did this in the 1966 season as well as the first time Austria hosted the opening race of the World Championship and therefore the first time the circuit hosted the opening round - an honour given to 13 previous venues since the inception of the World Championship in 1950. The circuit also hosted back to back races of the 2020 MotoGP season on 16 and 23 August, with the second race styled as a one off Styrian Grand Prix.

In the 2021 Formula One season, the Red Bull Ring hosted two races again due to the Canadian Grand Prix being cancelled and the Turkish Grand Prix being postponed because of the COVID-19 pandemic. The first of the two was titled as the Styrian Grand Prix, with the second being called the Austrian Grand Prix. These two races a week apart from each other saw Max Verstappen winning both from pole position. Also in MotoGP, following the cancellation of the Finnish Grand Prix in May 2021, the Styrian Grand Prix was added to the calendar on the weekend of 6 to 8 August, one week before the Austrian Grand Prix. The first race saw MotoGP rookie Jorge Martín claim his and Pramac Racing's first win in the premier class, whilst the second race saw Brad Binder take a shock home win for KTM despite finishing on dry tyres in wet conditions.

In January 2022, it was revealed that the circuit would be modified slightly for MotoGP and other motorcycle races, with a chicane being introduced at turn 2. However Formula One and other car racing series still continue to use the current layout.

== Layout history ==
Red Bull Ring layout history
Österreichring (1969–1976)

Österreichring (1977–1995)

Comparison of Österreichring and A1-Ring circuits

A1-Ring (1996–2003)

Proposed 2005 Red Bull Ring Westschleife extension

Red Bull Ring (2011–present)

An overview of the motor circuit around the year 2020

Red Bull Ring Motorcycle Circuit (2022–present)

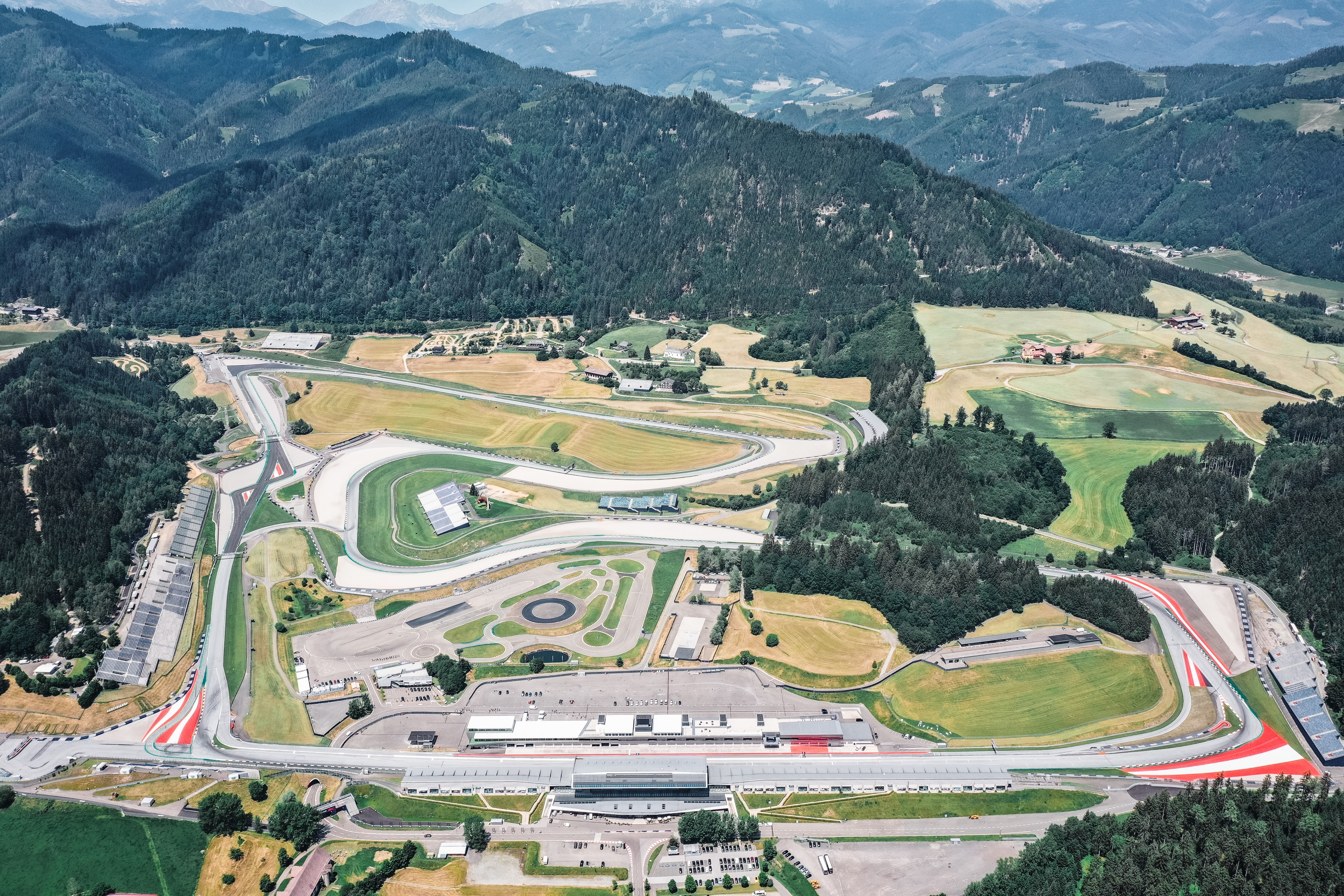
Aerial view of the Red Bull Ring in 2022

The redesigned track layout (black), as used between 1996 and 2003

== Events ==
Current

- April: Deutsche Tourenwagen Masters, Formula Regional European Championship, Porsche Carrera Cup Germany, ADAC GT Masters, ADAC GT4 Germany, Formula 4 CEZ Championship Rundstreckentrophy, GT Cup Series
- May: Ferrari Challenge Europe, Porsche Sprint Challenge Central Europe
- June: Formula One Austrian Grand Prix, FIA Formula 2 Championship Spielberg Formula 2 round, FIA Formula 3 Championship, Porsche Supercup
- August: BOSS GP Red Bull Ring Classics
- September: Grand Prix motorcycle racing Austrian motorcycle Grand Prix, Red Bull MotoGP Rookies Cup, Harley-Davidson Bagger World Cup

Future

- 24H Series (2017, 2027)
- F4 Germany Championship (2015–2021, 2027)
- Prototype Cup Europe (2027)
- TCR Europe Touring Car Series (2019, 2025, 207)

Former

- ADAC Formel Masters (2011–2014)
- ADAC TCR Germany Touring Car Championship (2016–2022)
- ATS Formel 3 Cup (1985–1987, 1989–1990, 2011–2012, 2014)
- Audi Sport TT Cup (2015, 2017)
- Auto GP (2014)
- BMW M1 Procar Championship (1979–1980)
- Deutsche Rennsport Meisterschaft (1985)
- DTM Trophy (2021–2022)
- Euro 4 Championship (2024)
- Eurocup-3 (2024–2025)
- Eurocup Clio (2013)
- Eurocup Mégane Trophy (2013)
- Euroformula Open Championship (2015–2016, 2019–2025)
- European Formula Two Championship (1972)
- European Le Mans Series
  - 4 Hours of Red Bull Ring (2013–2018, 2021)
- European Touring Car Championship (1978–1979, 1982–1987, 2000–2001)
- European Truck Racing Championship (1987–1989, 1999–2003, 2013–2017)
- F1 Academy (2023)
- Ferrari Challenge Italy (2002–2003, 2011)
- FIA European Formula 3 Championship (1977–1984)
- FIA Formula 3 European Championship (2012–2018)
- FIA Formula Two Championship (2011)
- FIA GT Championship
  - A1-Ring 500km (1997–1998, 2000–2001)
- FIM Endurance World Championship (1980–1987)
- Formula 3 Euro Series (2003)
- Formula 750 (1978–1979)
- Formula Abarth European Championship (2011–2012)
- Formula BMW ADAC (2000–2003)
- Formula One
  - Styrian Grand Prix (2020–2021)
- Formula Renault 2.0 Alps (2011–2012, 2014–2015)
- Formula Renault 2.0 Northern European Cup (2012, 2015)
- Formula Renault Eurocup (2001, 2013, 2016–2018)
- Formula Volkswagen Germany (2001)
- Grand Prix motorcycle racing
  - Styrian motorcycle Grand Prix (2020–2021)
- GT2 European Series (2022–2023)
- GT4 European Series (2015, 2017)
- IDM Superbike Championship (1995–1996, 2011–2013, 2021–2023)
- International Formula 3000 (1985–1986, 1997–2003)
- International GT Open (2011, 2015–2016, 2019–2025)
- Interserie (1972, 1980, 1982–1998, 2000–2003)
- Italian F4 Championship (2019–2022)
- Italian Formula Renault Championship (2003)
- Italian Formula Three Championship (2001, 2012)
- Italian GT Championship (1998, 2002–2003, 2012–2013)
- Le Mans Cup (2016–2018)
- Ligier European Series (2021)
- MotoE World Championship
  - Austrian eRace (2019, 2021–2025)
- Northern Talent Cup (2021–2023)
- Porsche Carrera Cup Benelux (2021, 2023–2024)
- Porsche Carrera Cup France (2023)
- Porsche Carrera Cup Italia (2012–2013)
- Prototype Cup Germany (2025)
- Red Bull Air Race World Championship (2014–2016)
- Renault Sport Trophy (2016)
- SEAT León Eurocup (2015–2016)
- Sidecar World Championship (1994, 1996–1999, 2023)
- Supercar Challenge (2017, 2023)
- Super Tourenwagen Cup (1994–1995)
- Superbike World Championship (1988–1994, 1997–1999)
- Supersport World Championship (1997–1999)
- TCR Eastern Europe Touring Car Series (2019, 2022–2025)
- TCR International Series (2015)
- Trofeo Maserati (2015)
- World Series Formula V8 3.5 (2003, 2013, 2015–2016)
- World Sportscar Championship
  - 1000 km Zeltweg (1969–1976)
- W Series (2021)

== Lap records ==
As of September 2026, the fastest official race lap records at the Red Bull Ring are listed as:

Category	Time	Driver	Vehicle	Event
Grand Prix Circuit (2025–present): 4.326 km (2.688 mi)
Formula One	1:07.924	Oscar Piastri	McLaren MCL39	2025 Austrian Grand Prix
FIA F2	1:18.160	Sebastián Montoya	Dallara F2 2024	2025 Spielberg Formula 2 round
FIA F3	1:22.963	Mari Boya	Dallara F3 2025	2025 Spielberg Formula 3 round
Euroformula Open	1:24.188	Michael Shin	Dallara 324	2025 Spielberg Euroformula Open round
GB3	1:25.643	Nikita Bedrin	Tatuus MSV GB3-025	2026 Spielberg GB3 round
Formula Regional	1:26.180	Mattia Colnaghi	Tatuus F3 T-318-EC3	2025 Spielberg Eurocup-3 round
SRO GT2	1:26.579	Rupert Atzberger	KTM X-Bow GT2	2025 Spielberg FIA CEZ Endurance round
GT3	1:27.272	Jürgen Alzen	BMW M4 GT3	2025 Spielberg GT Cup round
LMP3	1:27.481	Keanu Al Azhari	Duqueine D08	2025 Spielberg Prototype Cup Germany round
Ferrari Challenge	1:29.175	Fernando Monje	Ferrari 296 Challenge	2026 Spielberg Ferrari Challenge Europe round
Lamborghini Super Trofeo	1:29.687	Dennis Waszek	Lamborghini Huracán LP 620-2 Super Trofeo EVO2	2026 Spielberg GT Cup round
Porsche Carrera Cup	1:30.946	Flynt Schuring	Porsche 911 (992 II) Cup	2026 Spielberg Porsche Carrera Cup Germany round
Formula 4	1:32.371	Bart Harrison	Tatuus F4-T421	2025 1st Spielberg F4 CEZ round
Formula Renault 2.0	1:34.525	Sarene Ziffel	Tatuus FR2.0/13	2026 Spielberg Austria Formula Cup round
GT4	1:36.800	Benjamin Sylvestersson	BMW M4 GT4 Evo	2026 Spielberg ADAC GT4 Germany round
TCR Touring Car	1:37.351	Adam Kout	Hyundai Elantra N TCR	2025 Spielberg TCR Eastern Europe round
Renault Clio Cup	1:49.938	Bartlomiej Mirecki	Renault Clio R.S. V	2026 Spielberg Renault Clio Cup Bohemia round
Motorcycle Circuit (2022–present): 4.348 km (2.702 mi)
MotoGP	1:29.519	Francesco Bagnaia	Ducati Desmosedici GP24	2024 Austrian motorcycle Grand Prix
Moto2	1:32.879	Izan Guevara	Boscoscuro B-26	2026 Austrian motorcycle Grand Prix
Superbike	1:33.475	Markus Reiterberger	BMW M1000RR	2022 Spielberg IDM Superbike round
Supersport	1:37.488	Patrick Hobelsberger	Yamaha YZF-R6	2022 Spielberg IDM Supersport round
MotoE	1:38.016	Óscar Gutiérrez	Ducati V21L	2025 Austrian motorcycle Grand Prix
Bagger World Cup	1:38.689	Óscar Gutiérrez	Harley-Davidson Road Glide	2026 Spielberg Harley-Davidson Bagger World Cup round
Moto3	1:39.485	David Almansa	KTM RC250GP	2026 Austrian motorcycle Grand Prix
250cc	1:49.249	Jurrien van Crugten	KTM RC4 R	2022 Spielberg Northern Talent Cup round
Supersport 300	1:50.452	Walid Khan	KTM RC 390 R	2022 Spielberg IDM Supersport 300 round
Südschleife National Circuit (1996–present): 2.336 km (1.452 mi)
Group CN	0:48.120	Andreas Fiedler	PRC WPR60 Turbo	2014 Spielberg AvD Sports Car Challenge round
SEAT León Supercopa	0:56.323	Christian Ladurner	SEAT León Cup Racer	2013 Spielberg Cup und Tourenwagen Trophy round
Truck racing	1:05.333	Norbert Kiss	MAN TGS	2015 Spielberg ETRC round
Grand Prix Circuit (August 2016–2024): 4.318 km (2.683 mi)
Formula One	1:05.619	Carlos Sainz Jr.	McLaren MCL35	2020 Styrian Grand Prix
FIA F2	1:15.854	Nobuharu Matsushita	Dallara GP2/11	2017 Spielberg Formula 2 round
Formula Renault 3.5	1:17.038	Roy Nissany	Dallara T12	2016 Spielberg Formula V8 round
LMP2	1:20.177	Léo Roussel	Oreca 07	2017 4 Hours of Red Bull Ring
GP3	1:20.275	Leonardo Pulcini	Dallara GP3/16	2018 Spielberg GP3 round
FIA F3	1:20.968	Oscar Piastri	Dallara F3 2019	2020 2nd Spielberg Formula 3 round
Euroformula Open	1:23.304	Jak Crawford	Dallara 320	2021 Spielberg Euroformula Open round
Formula Three	1:23.355	Callum Ilott	Dallara F317	2017 Spielberg F3 European Championship round
DTM	1:23.474	Jamie Green	Audi RS5 DTM	2017 Spielberg DTM round
MotoGP	1:23.827	Andrea Dovizioso	Ducati Desmosedici GP19	2019 Austrian motorcycle Grand Prix
Formula Regional	1:26.180	Mattia Colnaghi	Tatuus F3 T-318-EC3	2025 Spielberg Eurocup-3 round
LMP3	1:26.406	Mikkel Jensen	Ligier JS P3	2017 4 Hours of Red Bull Ring
Formula Regional	1:26.523	Frederik Vesti	Tatuus F3 T-318	2019 Spielberg FREC round
Superbike	1:28.111	Illia Mykhalchyk	BMW M1000RR	2021 Spielberg IDM Superbike round
GT3	1:28.445	Christian Engelhart	Lamborghini Huracán GT3	2017 Spielberg ADAC GT Masters round
Moto2	1:28.687	Marco Bezzecchi	Kalex Moto2	2020 Styrian motorcycle Grand Prix
Formula Renault 2.0	1:29.039	Sacha Fenestraz	Tatuus FR2.0/13	2017 Spielberg Formula Renault Eurocup round
LM GTE	1:29.043	Matt Griffin	Ferrari 488 GTE Evo	2021 4 Hours of Red Bull Ring
Formula 4	1:30.109	Fabio Scherer	Tatuus F4-T014	2017 Spielberg ADAC Formula 4 round
Ferrari Challenge	1:30.281	Michelle Gatting	Ferrari 488 Challenge Evo	2021 Spielberg Ferrari Challenge Europe round
SRO GT2	1:30.443	Pierre Kaffer	Audi R8 LMS GT2	2023 Spielberg GT2 European Series round
Porsche Carrera Cup	1:31.282	Laurin Heinrich	Porsche 911 (992 I) GT3 Cup	2021 Spielberg Porsche Carrera Cup Germany round
Supersport	1:32.059	Valentin Debise	Kawasaki Ninja ZX-6R	2021 Spielberg IDM Supersport round
MotoE	1:35.161	Eric Granado	Energica Ego Corsa	2021 Austrian motorcycle Grand Prix
Moto3	1:36.058	Izan Guevara	GasGas RC250GP	2021 Austrian motorcycle Grand Prix
GT4	1:37.044	Gabriele Piana	BMW M4 GT4	2022 Spielberg ADAC GT4 Germany round
TCR Touring Car	1:37.049	Josh Files	Hyundai i30 N TCR	2019 Spielberg TCR Europe round
JS P4	1:37.544	Patrice Lafargue	Ligier JS P4	2021 Spielberg Ligier European Series round
SEAT León Supercopa	1:37.931	Julien Briché	SEAT León Cup Racer	2016 Spielberg SEAT León Eurocup round
Audi Sport TT Cup	1:38.312	Mikel Azcona	Audi TT Cup	2017 Spielberg Audi Sport TT Cup round
JS2 R	1:39.973	Mathieu Martins	Ligier JS2 R	2021 Spielberg Ligier European Series round
250cc	1:44.237	Lorenz Luciano	KTM RC4 R	2021 Spielberg Northern Talent Cup round
Supersport 300	1:45.609	Twan Smits	Yamaha YZF-R3	2021 Spielberg IDM Supersport 300 round
Renault Clio Cup	1:49.090	René Leutenegger	Renault Clio R.S. IV	2024 Spielberg Renault Clio Cup Bohemia round
A1-Ring/Red Bull Ring (1996–July 2016): 4.326 km (2.688 mi)
Formula One	1:08.337	Michael Schumacher	Ferrari F2003-GA	2003 Austrian Grand Prix
GP2	1:15.534	Mitch Evans	Dallara GP2/11	2016 Spielberg GP2 round
Formula Renault 3.5	1:18.501	Oliver Rowland	Dallara T12	2015 Spielberg Formula Renault 3.5 Series round
GP3	1:20.859	Charles Leclerc	Dallara GP3/16	2016 Spielberg GP3 round
Auto GP	1:21.222	Kimiya Sato	Lola B05/52	2014 Spielberg Auto GP round
Formula Nissan	1:22.170	Bas Leinders	Dallara SN01	2003 Spielberg Formula Nissan round
LMP2	1:22.392	Giedo van der Garde	Gibson 015S	2016 4 Hours of Red Bull Ring
F2 (2009–2012)	1:22.448	Mirko Bortolotti	Williams JPH1B	2011 Spielberg FTwo round
F3000	1:22.794	Tomáš Enge	Lola B02/50	2002 Spielberg F3000 round
DTM	1:23.442	Mattias Ekström	Audi RS5 DTM	2016 Spielberg DTM round
GT1 (Prototype)	1:23.802	Bernd Schneider	Mercedes-Benz CLK LM	1998 FIA GT A1-Ring 500km
Formula Three	1:24.874	Gustavo Menezes	Dallara F312	2015 Spielberg F3 European Championship round
Renault Sport Trophy	1:26.120	Pieter Schothorst	Renault Sport R.S. 01	2016 Spielberg Renault Sport Trophy round
LMP3	1:26.829	Giorgio Mondini	Ligier JS P3	2016 4 Hours of Red Bull Ring
GT3	1:28.459	Eric Curran	Chevrolet Corvette C7 GT3-R	2016 Spielberg ADAC GT Masters round
LMPC	1:28.502	Paul-Loup Chatin	Oreca FLM09	2013 3 Hours of Red Bull Ring
500cc	1:28.666	Mick Doohan	Honda NSR500 (NV0X)	1997 Austrian motorcycle Grand Prix
Formula Renault 2.0	1:28.794	Max Defourny	Tatuus FR2.0/13	2016 Spielberg Eurocup Formula Renault 2.0 round
LM GTE	1:29.166	Matteo Cairoli	Porsche 911 (991 I) RSR	2016 4 Hours of Red Bull Ring
Superbike	1:29.397	Erwan Nigon	BMW S1000RR	2013 Spielberg IDM Superbike round
Formula Abarth	1:30.203	Patric Niederhauser	Tatuus FA010	2011 Spielberg Formula Abarth round
World SBK	1:30.276	Troy Corser	Ducati 916 SBK	1998 Spielberg World SBK round
GT1 (GTS)	1:30.364	Jamie Campbell-Walter	Lister Storm GT	2001 FIA GT A1-Ring 500km
GT2	1:30.570	Stéphane Ortelli	Porsche 911 GT2	1998 FIA GT A1-Ring 500 km
Porsche Carrera Cup	1:32.116	Sven Müller	Porsche 911 (991) GT3 Cup	2016 Spielberg Porsche Supercup round
250cc	1:32.392	Loris Capirossi	Aprilia RS250	1997 Austrian motorcycle Grand Prix
Supersport	1:33.040	Jan Bühn	Yamaha YZF-R6	2013 Spielberg IDM Supersport round
Formula 4	1:33.150	David Beckmann	Tatuus F4-T014	2015 Spielberg ADAC Formula 4 round
Ferrari Challenge	1:34.459	Stefano Gai	Ferrari 458 Challenge	2011 Spielberg Ferrari Challenge Italy round
Formula Volkswagen	1:34.872	Sven Barth	Reynard Formula Volkswagen	2001 Spielberg Formula Volkswagen Germany round
Eurocup Mégane Trophy	1:34.936	Mirko Bortolotti	Renault Mégane Renault Sport II	2013 Spielberg Eurocup Mégane Trophy round
N-GT	1:35.453	Luca Riccitelli	Porsche 911 (996) GT3-RS	2001 FIA GT A1-Ring 500km
World SSP	1:35.853	Cristiano Migliorati	Ducati 748	1998 Spielberg World SSP round
ADAC Formel Masters	1:36.338	Jason Kremer	Dallara Formulino	2012 Spielberg ADAC Formel Masters round
Super Touring	1:36.800	Gabriele Tarquini	Honda Accord	2001 Spielberg ESTC round
Formula BMW	1.37.872	Michael Devaney	Mygale FB02	2002 Spielberg Formula BMW ADAC round
Trofeo Maserati	1:38.314	Fredrik Blomstedt	Maserati Trofeo	2015 Spielberg Trofeo Maserati Corse World Series round
TCR Touring Car	1:38.448	Andrea Belicchi	Honda Civic TCR (FK2)	2016 Spielberg TCR Germany round
125cc	1:39.596	Valentino Rossi	Aprilia RS125	1997 Austrian motorcycle Grand Prix
Audi Sport TT Cup	1:39.749	Dennis Marschall	Audi TT Cup	2015 Spielberg Audi Sport TT Cup round
GT4	1:40.015	Peter Ebner	KTM X-Bow GT4	2015 Spielberg GT4 European Series round
SEAT León Supercopa	1:40.214	Pol Rosell	SEAT León Cup Racer	2015 Spielberg SEAT León Eurocup round
Renault Clio Cup	1:47.671	Cristian Ricciarini	Renault Clio III RS (197)	2015 Spielberg Clio Cup Italia round
Österreichring (1988–1995): 5.852 km (3.636 mi)
Group C	1:31.228	Manuel Reuter	Porsche 962C	1993 Zeltweg Interserie round
Interserie	1:34.454	Ranieri Randaccio	Fondmetal FG-01	1995 Zeltweg Interserie round
Formula Three	1:47.689	Michael Schumacher	Reynard 903	1990 Spielberg German F3 round
World SBK	1:50.408	Andreas Meklau	Ducati 888 SBK	1994 Spielberg World SBK round
Super Touring	1:55.740	Joachim Winkelhock	BMW 318is	1995 Spielberg STW Cup round
Österreichring (1977–1987): 5.941 km (3.692 mi)
Formula One	1:28.318	Nigel Mansell	Williams FW11B	1987 Austrian Grand Prix
Group C	1:36.183	Walter Brun	Porsche 962C	1986 Zeltweg Interserie round
F3000	1:42.244	Mike Thackwell	Ralt RB20	1985 Spielberg F3000 round
Formula Three	1:47.689	Gerhard Berger	Ralt RT3	1984 Spielberg European F3 round
Can-Am	1:47.770	Roland Binder	Persy 85-01	1985 Spielberg DRM round
BMW M1 Procar	1:54.220	Markus Höttinger	BMW M1 Procar	1979 Spielberg BMW M1 Procar round
Group 2	2:03.400	Carlo Facetti	BMW 3.0 CSL	1979 Spielberg ETCC round
Group A	2:04.440	Tom Walkinshaw	Jaguar XJS	1984 Spielberg ETCC round
Original Österreichring Circuit (1969–1976): 5.911 km (3.673 mi)
Group 5 prototype	1:35.810	Jacky Ickx	Alfa Romeo 33/TT/12	1974 1000 km Zeltweg
Formula One	1:35.910	James Hunt	McLaren M23	1976 Austrian Grand Prix
Group 5 sports car	1:39.350	Pedro Rodríguez	Porsche 917K	1971 Austrian 1000km
Group 7	1:39.380	Leo Kinnunen	Porsche 917/10 TC	1972 Zeltweg Interserie round
Formula Two	1:43.480	Emerson Fittipaldi	Lotus 69	1972 Spielberg F2 round
Group 4	1:54.440	Clemens Schickentanz	Porsche Carrera RSR	1975 GT-Europameisterschaft um den Raiffeisen-Pokal Österreichring

== Concerts ==
Date	Performer	Tour
11 June 1995	Bon Jovi	These Days Tour
1 August 1995	The Rolling Stones	Voodoo Lounge Tour
15 August 2000	Bon Jovi	Crush Tour
14 May 2015	AC/DC	Rock or Bust World Tour
16 September 2017	The Rolling Stones	No Filter Tour
