= 2025 AU3 Championship =

Motor racing competition

The 2025 AU3 Championship was a planned Australian racing series for Formula Regional open-wheeler race cars. It was scheduled to be the inaugural season of the AU3 Championship, organized by the promoter of the Australian Formula Open series, two-time Australian Gold Star winner Tim Macrow. The championship was to feature drivers competing in cars that conform to the current FIA Formula Regional regulations.

Drivers were to compete to win a fully-funded multi-day test program with Hillspeed, a GB3 Championship team.

After customs issues arose when the series' cars were shipped to Australia, the opening round was canceled, before the planned second round was then also canceled on short notice before the series' organizers confirmed that due to these delays and lack of interest by drivers and teams, the inaugural season would now be held in 2026, thereby canceling the planned 2025 season in its entirety.

== Entry list ==
All drivers were to compete with identical Tatuus FT-60 chassis cars powered by either Toyota or Alfa Romeo engines. The championship planned to use the cars raced in the Formula Regional Oceania Championship as part of an agreement that saw the chassis shipped from New Zealand to Australia and vice versa after each championship had concluded.

== Race calendar ==
The first version of 2025 calendar was announced on 20 December 2024. The championships' inaugural season was originally scheduled to consist of five race weekends, with the date and venue of the final round - planned to be held in New Zealand - yet to be revealed. The series was originally due to begin on 16–18 May at Phillip Island Grand Prix Circuit, but a delay in shipping the cars from New Zealand meant the round was postponed on May 7, with Goulburn set to host the opening round instead. That event was then also cancelled, with the championship then planned to start in late July before its eventual cancellation.
