= AU3 Championship =

Single-seater racing championship

- Category: Formula Regional
- Country: Australia
- Inaugural season: 2026
- Constructors: Tatuus
- Engine suppliers: Toyota, Alfa Romeo
- Tyre suppliers: Hankook
- Official website: Official website

The AU3 Championship is a planned Australian motor racing series using Formula Regional cars.

== Background ==
The new series was announced (originally titled Formula Regional Australia) in November 2024 for the 2025 season. The new name was announced by the organisers in February 2025. The name aligns with the recent name change of the AU4 Australian Championship.

It will be sanctioned by Motorsport Australia and is promoted by Tim Macrow, the organiser of Australian Formula Open, another Australian open-wheel racing series using older Formula 3 and Formula 4 cars.

The series will use the Tatuus FT-60 cars currently used for the Formula Regional Oceania Championship, which is based in New Zealand and runs in the southern hemisphere summer, leaving them available for use much of the year. However, additional entries using cars sourced from elsewhere using the Alfa Romeo FR engine commonly used throughout Asian FR series will be permitted, along with an Invitational class using older Formula Regional vehicles

It was announced the 2025 season would be cancelled and a new debut season planned for 2026.
