= 2022 Toyota Racing Series =

Motor racing competition

The 2022 Castrol Toyota Racing Series was to be the eighteenth running of the Toyota Racing Series, the premier open-wheel motorsport category held in New Zealand. The season was planned to consist of only one two-race weekend at Hampton Downs, with the second race of the weekend hosting the 67th running of the New Zealand Grand Prix, but was cancelled eventually.

== Entry list ==
All drivers were scheduled to compete with identical Tatuus FT-60 chassis cars powered by 2.0L turbocharged Toyota engines.

No.	Driver
–	(New Zealand) James Penrose

== Race calendar ==
After the 2021 season had a heavily shortened calendar compared to previous seasons due to the COVID-19 pandemic, a four-round calendar with a return to New Zealand's southern island was planned. However, after the organizer's isolation proposal for overseas drivers could not be reviewed in time by the government, the decision was originally made to only run one round in 2022, with the first, shorter race awarding the Dorothy Smith National Memorial Cup, while the second, longer feature race would have been the 67th running of the New Zealand Grand Prix.

However, on 11 January 2022, organizers announced that the race weekend and with it the season would be cancelled because of ongoing border restrictions.

Round	Race name	Circuit	Date
~~R1~~	Dorothy Smith National Memorial Cup	Hampton Downs Motorsport Park (Hampton Downs, North Waikato)	13 February
~~R2~~	67th New Zealand Grand Prix	Hampton Downs Motorsport Park (Hampton Downs, North Waikato)	13 February
