= Tatuus FT-60 =

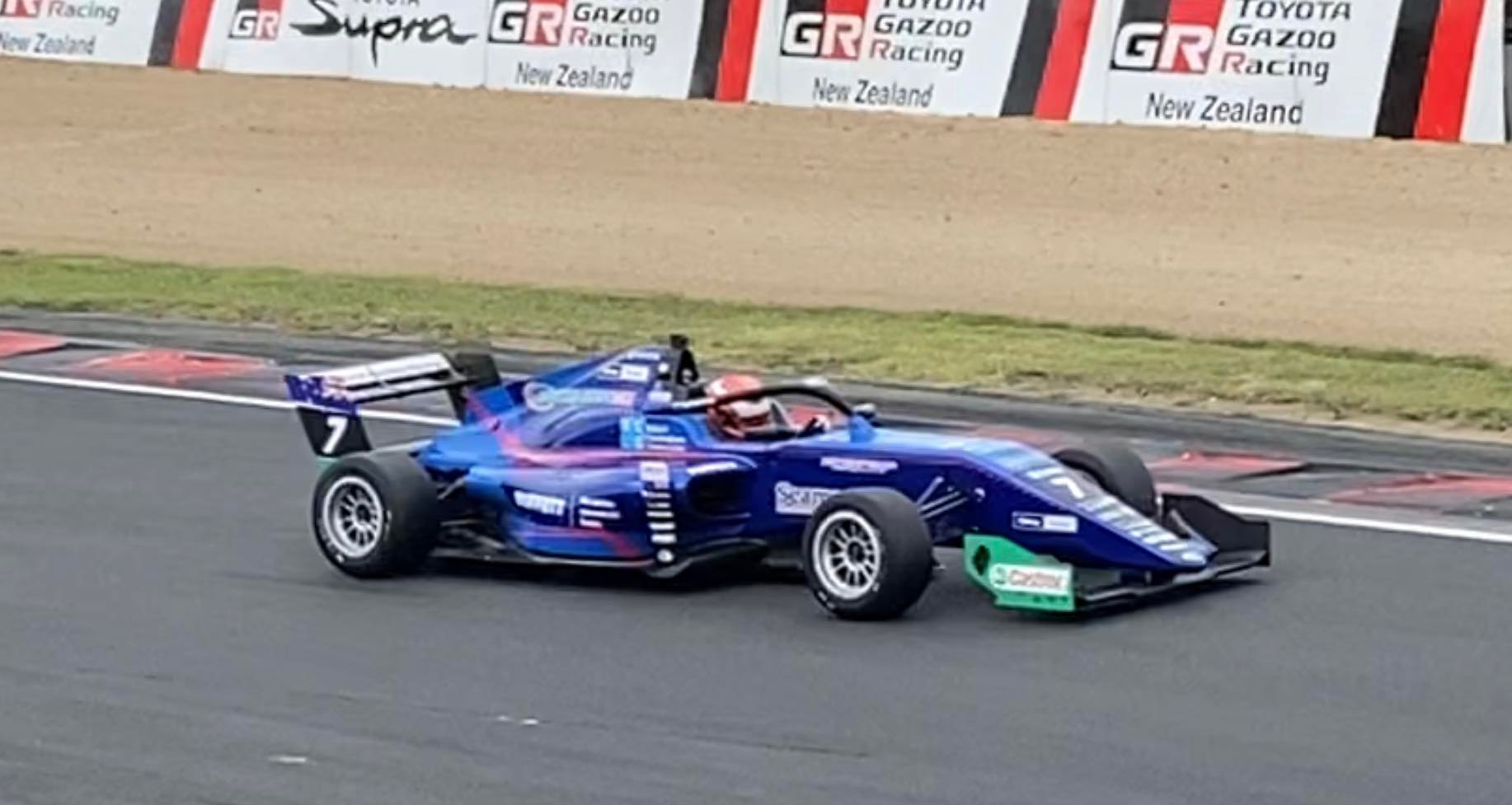
- Category: Toyota Racing Series (2020–2021, 2023–present); W Series (2 rounds in 2022)
- Constructor: Tatuus
- Predecessor: Tatuus FT-50

Technical specifications
- Chassis: Carbon-fiber monocoque and body
- Suspension (front): Push-rod with Supashock twin 2 way-adjustable shock absorbers, adjustable anti-roll bar
- Suspension (rear): Push-rod with Supashock twin 2 way-adjustable shock absorbers, adjustable anti-roll bar
- Length: 4,850 mm (191 in)
- Width: 1,850 mm (73 in)
- Height: 955 mm (38 in)
- Axle track: 1,510 mm (59 in) (front); 1,460 mm (57 in) (rear)
- Wheelbase: 2,750 mm (108 in)
- Engine: Toyota 8AR-FTS 2.0 L (122 in^{3}) inline-4 spark-ignition DOHC engine; turbocharged, longitudinally mounted; mid-engine, rear-wheel drive layout
- Transmission: SADEV SL-R 82 6-speed semi-automatic sequential gearbox
- Power: 270 PS (199 kW)
- Weight: 665 kg (1,466 lb) including driver
- Fuel: 2024 P1 Racing Fuel 2020 BP 98
- Lubricants: Castrol
- Brakes: Brembo 4-piston calipers Ventilated aluminium brake discs
- Tyres: Pirelli (2024); Hankook (2020–2023)

Competition history
- Debut: 2020

The Tatuus FT-60 is an open-wheel formula race car, jointly designed, developed and built by Italian manufacturer Tatuus and Toyota Gazoo Racing New Zealand that has been used in the Formula Regional Oceania Championship since 2020.

The vehicle is equipped with a Toyota engine which has also more displacement than the Alfa Romeo and Renault Sport engines used in the Tatuus F3 T-318 and Tatuus FR-19 race cars.

After the cancellation of the 2022 Toyota Racing Series, the cars were loaned to the W Series for the races in Barcelona and Singapore in order to reduce the transport costs of delivering Tatuus F3 T-318 cars.
