= W Series (championship) =

Female-only single-seater racing championship

- Category: Single-seater
- Country: International
- Inaugural season: 2019
- Folded: 2022
- Drivers: List
- Constructors: Tatuus
- Engine suppliers: Alfa Romeo; Toyota
- Tyre suppliers: Hankook
- Last Drivers' champion: (United Kingdom) Jamie Chadwick
- Official website: web.archive.org/web/20230315195732/wseries.com/

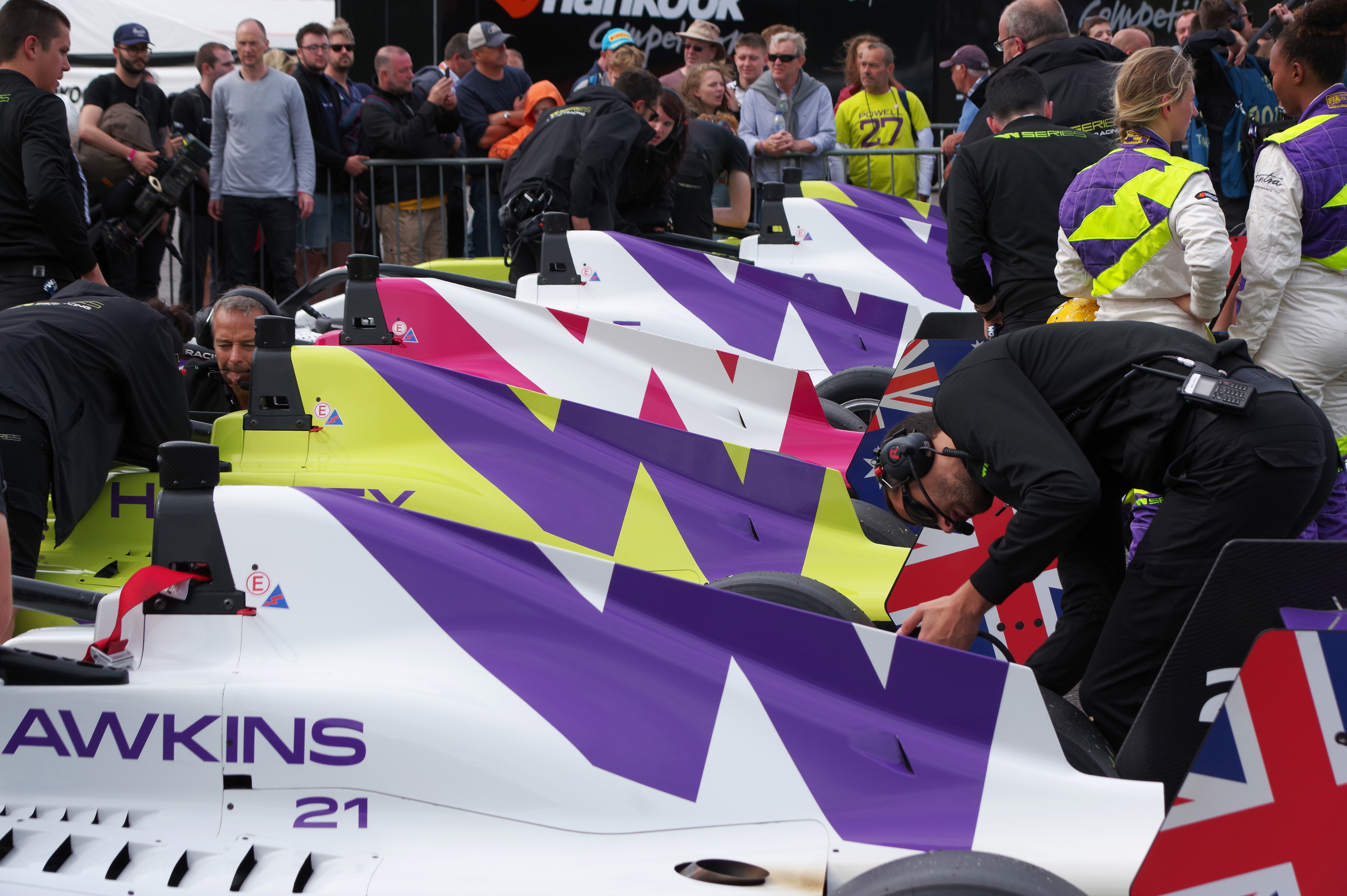
W Series logo on the Tatuus F3 T-318; 2019 season.

W Series was an all-female single-seater racing championship. It was held over a total of three seasons in 2019, 2021 and 2022 before the championship fell into administration and later liquidated, with a planned season in 2020 cancelled due to the COVID-19 pandemic. All three editions were won by Jamie Chadwick.

== History ==
=== Background and formation ===
The W Series was publicly launched on 10 October 2018, following the circulation of rumours about the creation of a female-only racing series beginning in November 2017. It was created in response to the lack of female drivers progressing to the highest levels of motorsport, particularly Formula One. Scottish businessman Sean Wadsworth was confirmed as the series main financier, with Catherine Bond Muir – a solicitor who helped facilitate the sale of Chelsea F.C. to Roman Abramovich – named as CEO. Other shareholders included a number of prominent members of the motorsport community, including former F1 driver David Coulthard and engineer Adrian Newey. Former McLaren sporting director Dave Ryan was confirmed as the series race director.

=== 2019 ===
The inaugural season was run in support of the 2019 Deutsche Tourenwagen Masters, a touring car championship based in Germany, and all cars were operated by Hitech Grand Prix. It consisted of six rounds that were held at six different circuits, two in Germany and four in other European countries. Prior to the season starting, 61 drivers were longlisted to appear in an evaluation with the intention of finding the best 18 to race in the series full-time, with 54 showing up. This was then cut to a 28-driver shortlist of drivers who would get to test the competitions' Tatuus–Alfa Romeo F3 T-318 cars before the final 18 permanent drivers and two reserves were confirmed.

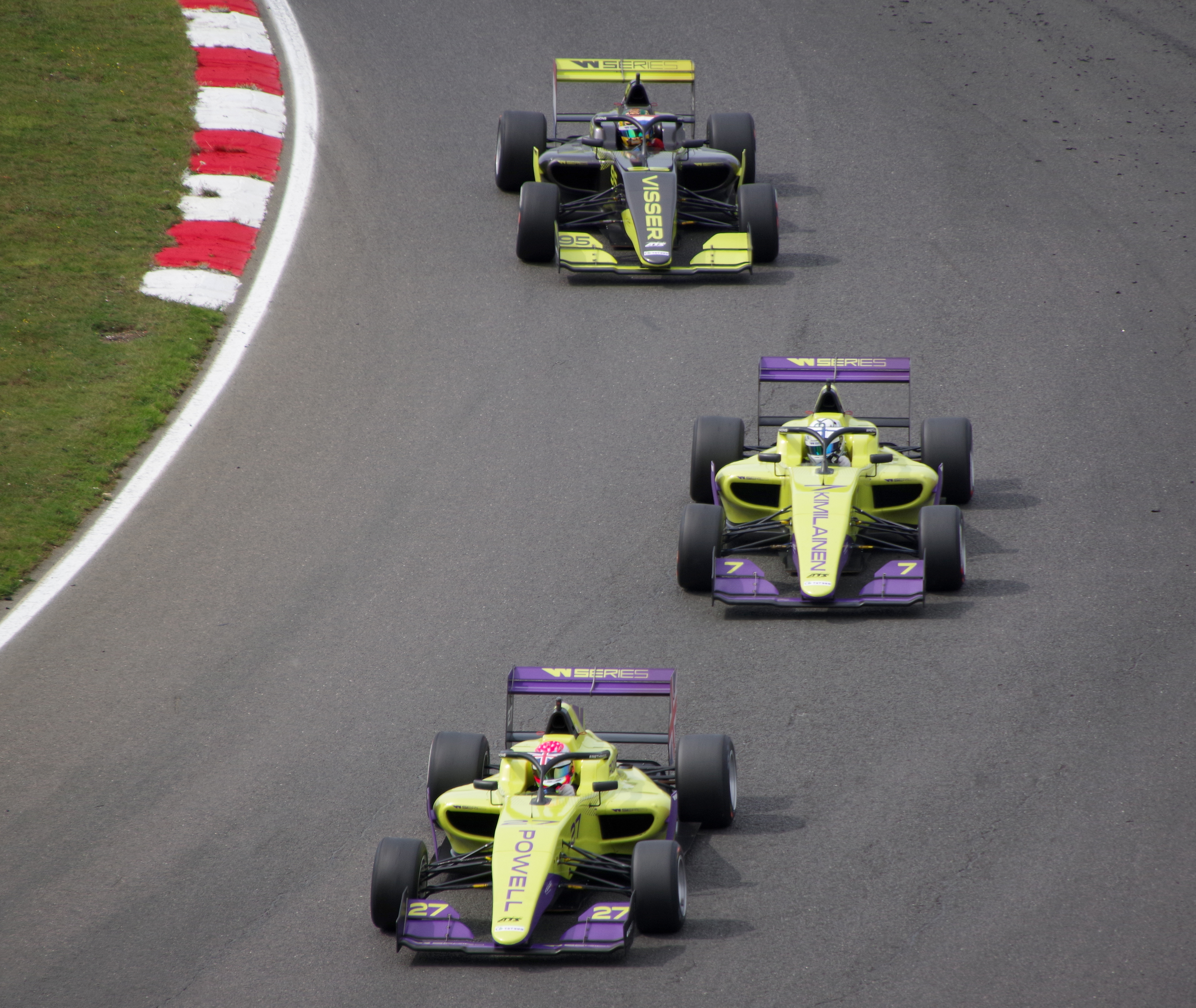
Alice Powell leads Emma Kimiläinen and Beitske Visser at the 2019 W Series Brands Hatch round.

The 2019 season began at the Hockenheimring, with series' favourite Jamie Chadwick dominating proceedings. Marta García impressed on debut with a podium as did Miki Koyama, climbing from 17th on the grid to finish 7th. Emma Kimiläinen was injured in a clash with Megan Gilkes that required her to sit out the next two rounds, and she was replaced with both reserve drivers – Sarah Bovy and Vivien Keszthelyi. Beitske Visser beat Chadwick off the front row in the second race at Zolder and lead from start to finish, ahead of a battling Chadwick and Alice Powell. Fabienne Wohlwend claimed pole position at Misano, but made a slow start and collided with Powell at the first corner – the Liechtensteiner made the finish in 3rd behind winner Chadwick and runner-up Visser. García then claimed a lights-to-flag win in the championship's first street race in Nuremberg, with Kimiläinen finishing fifth on her return – and the Finn backed that up with a win and the series' first Grand Slam at the next round in Assen after an early-race duel with Powell. An experimental non-championship was held on the Assen weekend, with inexperienced and under-fire Gilkes – who was benched from the Nuremberg round for a lack of pace – beating Powell by 0.003 seconds in an incident-packed heat. Chadwick and Visser were the only drivers in contention for the title in the season finale at Brands Hatch, with Chadwick taking the inaugural championship despite finishing the race behind Visser – with Powell claiming her maiden win on home soil.

=== 2020 ===
The calendar for the 2020 season was announced in early 2020, with six European rounds in support of the DTM and two events in North America supporting Formula One. The initial drivers' list confirmed that the top twelve finishers from the 2019 championship were automatically qualified for the 2020 series, joined by six new recruits from a scaled down evaluation held in September 2019. Series-wide sponsorship was confirmed from mobile phone manufacturer ROKiT. The 2020 season was cancelled due to the COVID-19 pandemic and a 10-event eSports series was held on the iRacing platform in its place. Beitske Visser won the eSports league with a round to spare having won 11 of the 30 races.

=== 2021 ===
The 2021 season featured eight races, and was run in support of the 2021 Formula One World Championship. Initially planned to be held at eight separate venues, the proposed finale in Mexico was cancelled after Formula One postponed the parent Grand Prix and it was replaced with a second race at an event in Austin. The series switched their technical support from Hitech to Double R Racing, operating as "Fine Moments", and launched a 'team' system based around commercial entrants for financial and identification purposes. Powell took a wire-to-wire win in a chaotic first race in Spielberg that saw reigning champion Chadwick torpedoed by Jessica Hawkins, however Chadwick struck back to win the second round at the Red Bull Ring a week later with 17-year-old rookie Irina Sidorkova finishing second. Powell then claimed her second win of the season at Silverstone having trailed Wohlwend for most of the race, before Chadwick took a crushing victory by over 10 seconds in Budapest.

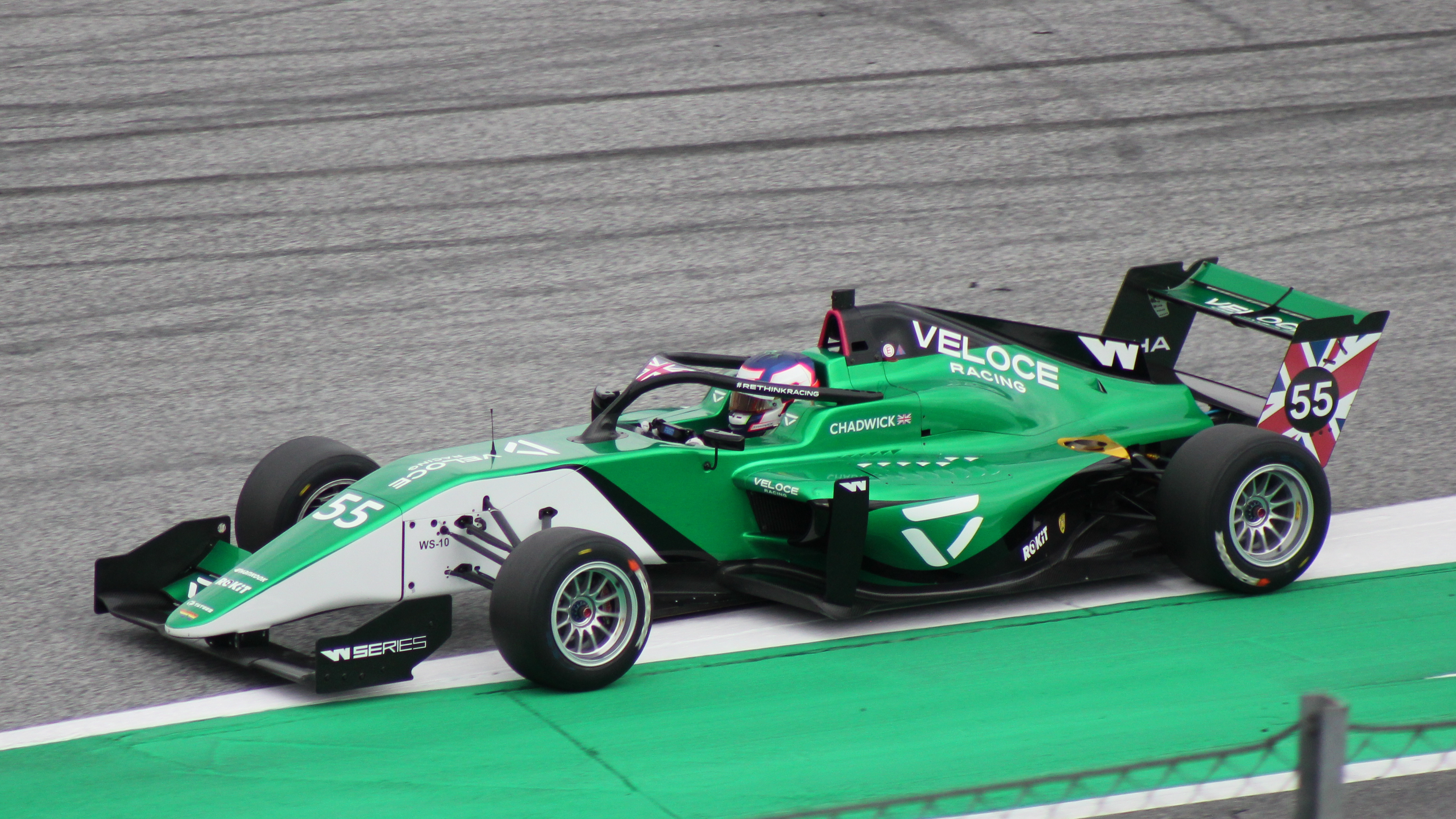
Jamie Chadwick won her second successive title in 2021.

The following round at Spa-Francorchamps was overshadowed by a six-car pile-up in qualifying, resulting in Visser and Ayla Ågren withdrawn from the race – Kimiläinen claimed her first win of the season in torrential rain ahead of Chadwick and Marta García. Powell won her third race of the season in a processional affair at Zandvoort that saw her draw level on points with Chadwick at the top of the table heading into the final round. Reserve driver Abbi Pulling claimed a shock pole position at the final round in Austin before Chadwick won both races to successfully defend her title. The season ended in minor controversy after Abbie Eaton fractured her T4 vertebra following a collision with a sausage kerb in the first race of the weekend.

=== 2022 ===
The championship continued to be run in support of Formula One in 2022, and was initially scheduled to feature eight races as well. The calendar was later expanded to feature ten races, including double-headers to start and finish the season. The top eight drivers from the 2021 season automatically qualified for the 2022 season, including the surprise return of dual-champion Chadwick with support from Caitlyn Jenner. A further five drivers were retained from the previous season, joined by five rookies – Sidorkova was scheduled to return for a sophomore season, however was dropped following the Russian invasion of Ukraine.

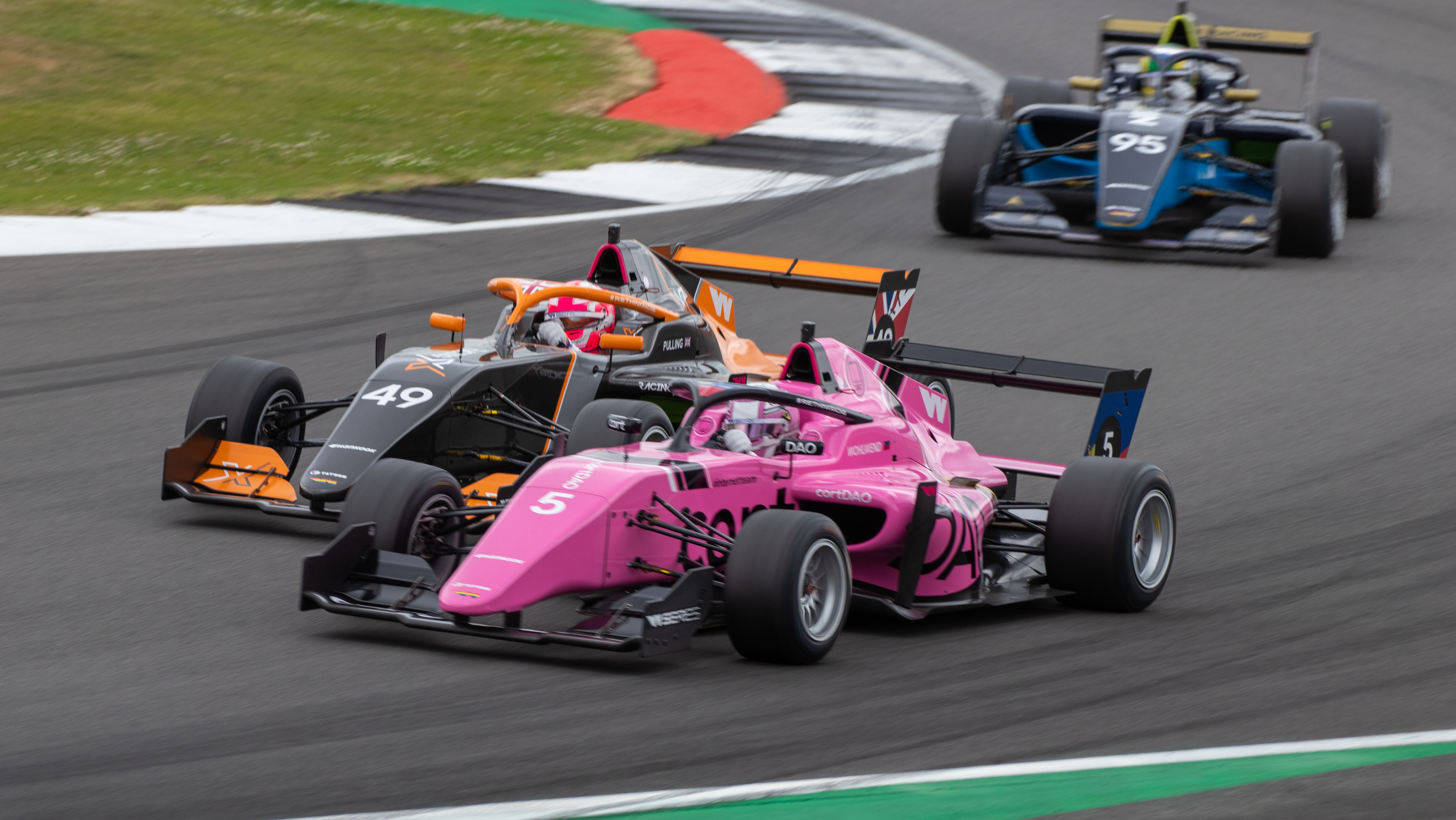
Fabienne Wohlwend leads Abbi Pulling and Beitske Visser at the 2022 W Series Silverstone round.

Nerea Martí scored an upset pole position for the first race in Miami. Kimiläinen led most of a race that had been interrupted by a red flag and multiple Safety Cars before a gearbox problem on the final lap handed victory to Chadwick. Chadwick then backed it up with victory in the second race, as Martí was controversially demoted to third behind Powell for an unseen incident. Chadwick then scored her third win of the season in Barcelona despite coming under late pressure from Pulling, before cantering to a sixth-straight win overall at Silverstone following a stop-go penalty for Powell and a late clash for fellow podium finishers Pulling and Kimiläinen. Chadwick's run then looked threatened by a grid penalty at Circuit Paul Ricard following a qualifying infringement, but she recovered to take the lead in the opening 3 corners and yet another win as Eaton crashed heavily at the start and team-mates Marta García and Wohlwend engaged in a fierce battle for sixth. Chadwick's reign was finally toppled in a damp race at the Hungaroring, qualifying fifth and finishing second behind Powell in an incident-packed race.

After Budapest it was reported that the series was facing significant financial difficulties, as reported in company accounts filed with the UK Companies House on 5 September 2022, which showed that it had net liabilities of over £7.5 million to 31 December 2021, with debts to a number of creditors; including Whisper, the media production company owned by Jake Humphrey and David Coulthard, and Velocity Experience, the company that provides hospitality services to the series. Doubts were expressed whether it would be able to complete the 2022 season. The sixth round of the season was moved from Suzuka to Singapore due to "operational challenges". A tropical storm affected qualifying and resulted in a jumbled grid, leaving Chadwick only eighth; the Briton subsequently crashed out of the race whilst trying to make up the lost ground, with Visser claiming just her second W Series race win.

On 10 October 2022, a week after the Singapore round, the remaining three races – which included a single race at Circuit of the Americas and a double-header at Autódromo Hermanos Rodríguez – were cancelled due to financial issues, making Singapore the last race in the series. Simultaneously, series CEO Catherine Bond Muir expressed confidence that the championship would return in 2023. Jamie Chadwick was declared series champion, her third title in as many seasons.

=== Demise ===
In November 2022, Formula One announced the creation of Formula 4-level F1 Academy – another racing series for young women a step below W Series, with the participation of five teams with experience in Formula 2 and Formula 3, debuting in 2023. Ahead of the first F1 Academy race in late April 2023, the W Series was yet to make an official statement regarding its fate and its return during the year was deemed unlikely. When the W Series was struggling with financial issues, the F1 Academy was established, but it did not coexist with it.

On 15 June 2023, it was reported that the series had gone into administration. Two months later, administrators Evelyn Partners confirmed that the last series employee had been made redundant and assets including 19 Tatuus–Alfa Romeo F3 T-318s would be sold in late-September 2023. As of closing, the company had profits totalling GB£515 and debts totalling GB£23million owed to 151 creditors. Whilst not on the list of owed creditors, multiple drivers – including Alice Powell, Abbi Pulling and Beitske Visser – also claimed that the series had not paid out prize money for the 2022 season. In late-January 2024, 722 lots of W Series assets – ranging from chassis, gearboxes, unclaimed trophies and race suits to toolboxes, vehicle stands and vacuum cleaners – that had been held at a site in the Dunsfold Park complex went up for auction.

In July 2024, the Formula E championship purchased the series' intellectual property rights for GB£110,000 as part of the debt clearing process. It was also reported that the series still had multiple debtors, including US$20 million owed by 2021 commercial entrant The Bunker and US$52,000 owed by 2022 commercial entrant Caitlyn Jenner.

== Championship and event format ==
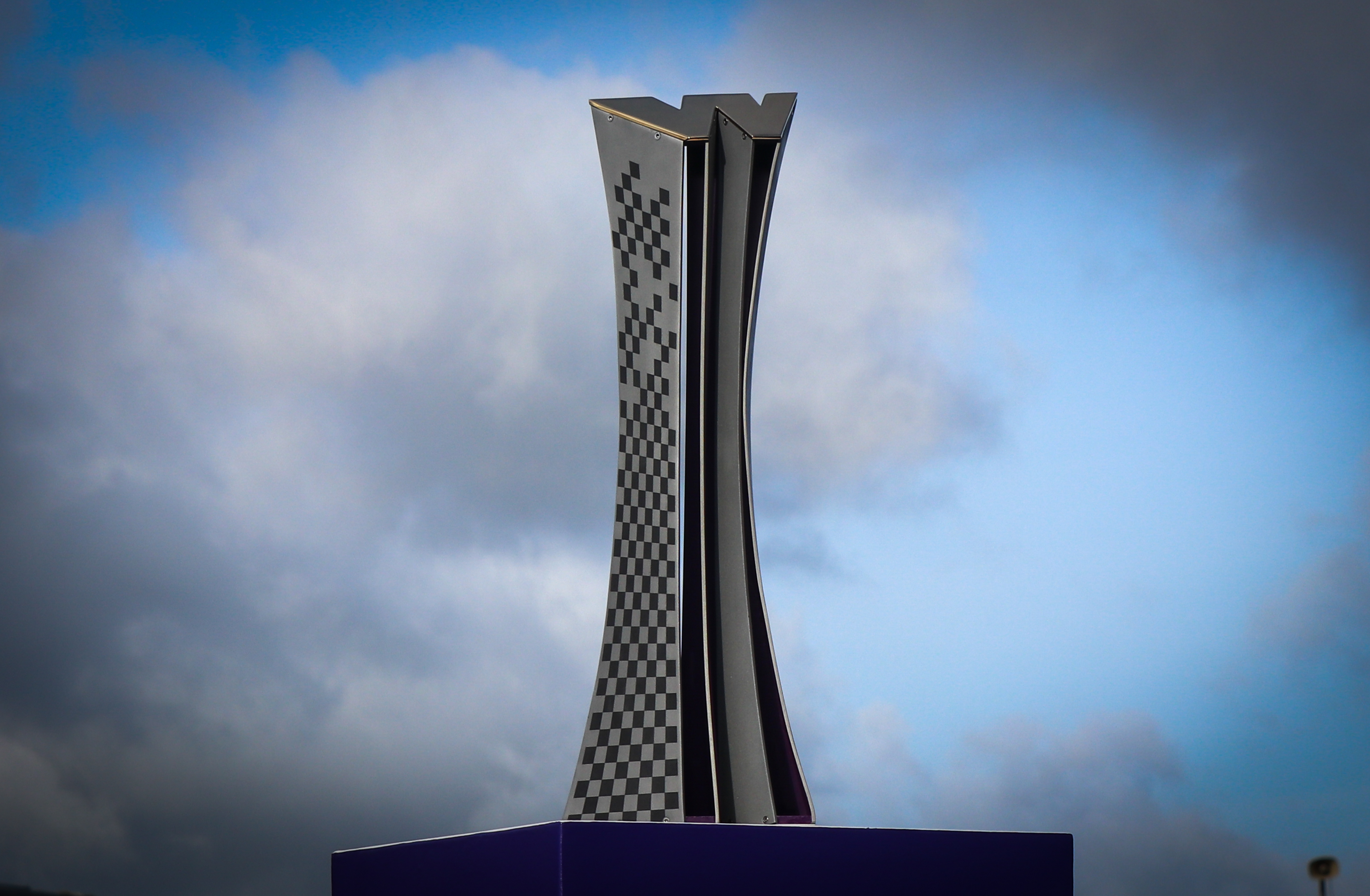
The W Series championship trophy.

In 2019, each event featured two 30-minute practice sessions on Friday followed by a 30-minute qualifying session and a 30-minute plus 1 lap race on Saturday. The exception to this was the Assen round, where a half-hour non-championship exhibition race was held in addition to the existing format on Sunday morning. From 2021, the series scrapped one of the practice sessions and moved qualifying to Friday. At two events (Austin 2021 and Miami 2022) the championship hosted two 30min + 1 lap races, one on Saturday and one on Sunday, with the grid for the second race set by a drivers' second-fastest lap time in qualifying.

The W Series championship title was awarded to the competitor with the highest number of points from all events run, excluding any penalty points incurred. If two or more drivers finish the season with the same number of points, the higher place in the series shall be awarded to the driver with the highest number of race wins. If the number of race wins is the same, the championship title shall be awarded according to the number of second-place finishes, third-place finishes and so on.

From 2020, W Series became eligible for FIA Super Licence points – with 15 awarded to the champion. If the champion elected to remain in the series however, the points would be rescinded.

=== Points system ===
Points were awarded to the top ten classified finishers as follows:

Position	1st	2nd	3rd	4th	5th	6th	7th	8th	9th	10th
Points	25	18	15	12	10	8	6	4	2	1

== Teams and drivers ==
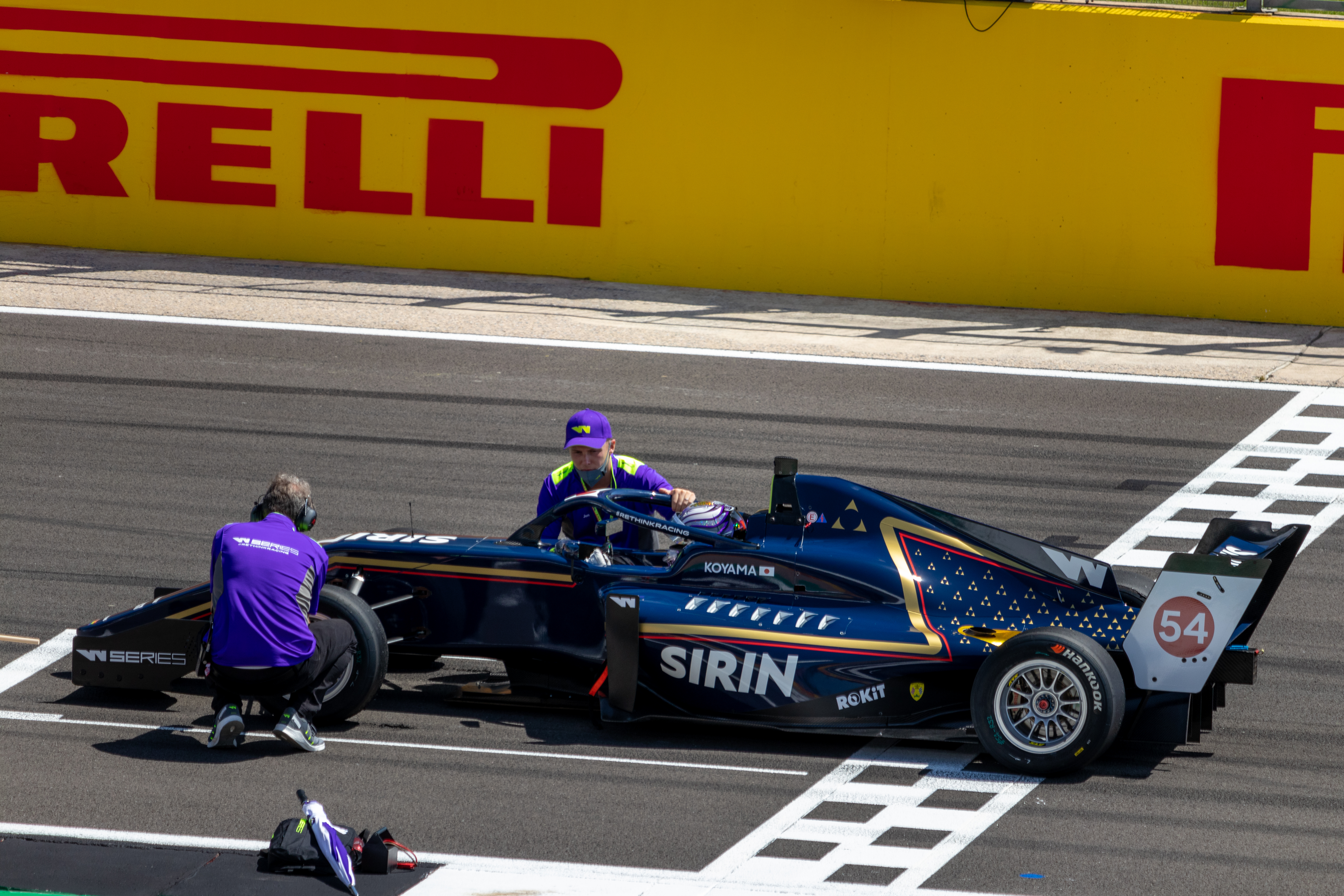
Miki Koyama on the grid at the 2021 W Series Silverstone round.

=== Teams ===
W Series utilised a centralised team structure throughout its existence. For the first season in 2019, Hitech Grand Prix were employed to operate all cars, providing 50 staff to help prepare and transport the equipment, and all 20 cars ran one of five variants of an unsponsored W Series-themed livery. Double R Racing (operating as "Fine Moments") replaced Hitech as the series technical partner in 2021, and a commercial entrant system was introduced whereby nine "teams" of two cars each would participate in an attempt to encourage financial investment – attracting German sportswear brand Puma, American car club The Bunker, American business magazine Forbes and British eSports team Veloce, with the rest of the teams given generic W Series-themed titles.

Having intended to establish separate teams for the 2022 season, the centralised operational structure and commercial entrant system remained, however teams were allowed to choose which drivers competed for them. Puma were the only brand to continue their support into the 2022 season, and were joined by American media personality Caitlyn Jenner, British car dealer Bristol Street Motors, Bahamian-registered cryptocurrency exchange Quantfury, and Singapore-based oil trader Michael Livingston through an NFT-based initiative named CortDAO.

=== Drivers ===
In each season, W Series ran between 18 and 20 drivers – this normally consisted of 18 'regular' drivers who contested the season full-time, and two 'reserves' who acted as replacements in the event a regular driver was injured or unwell. W Series had two dedicated reserve drivers in 2019 (originally scheduled to be four), a pool of five reserves with only two attending each event in 2021, and just the one reserve in 2022.

Before each season, an evaluation was held to select drivers. For the inaugural season, a two-part process was employed – firstly a 54-driver, three-day camp in Austria where drivers conducted modules in groups based on the FIA Institute Young Driver Excellence Academy program, followed by a 28-driver, four-day test of the series' Tatuus F3 T-318 racecars in Spain. The drivers who finished outside the top 12 in the 2019 championship underwent re-evaluation at seasons' end in a three-day test similar to the second stage of original evaluation along with 14 potential new recruits to fill the field for the 2020 season, with these drivers carried over to the 2021 season after the 2020 season was cancelled. For 2022, the top 8 drivers in the 2021 season were automatically retained – potential recruits underwent private testing in Formula 4 machinery in Arizona first followed by evaluation at the series' pre-season test in Barcelona. The 2019 evaluation process proved controversial having drawn mixed reactions from attendees.

== Cars ==
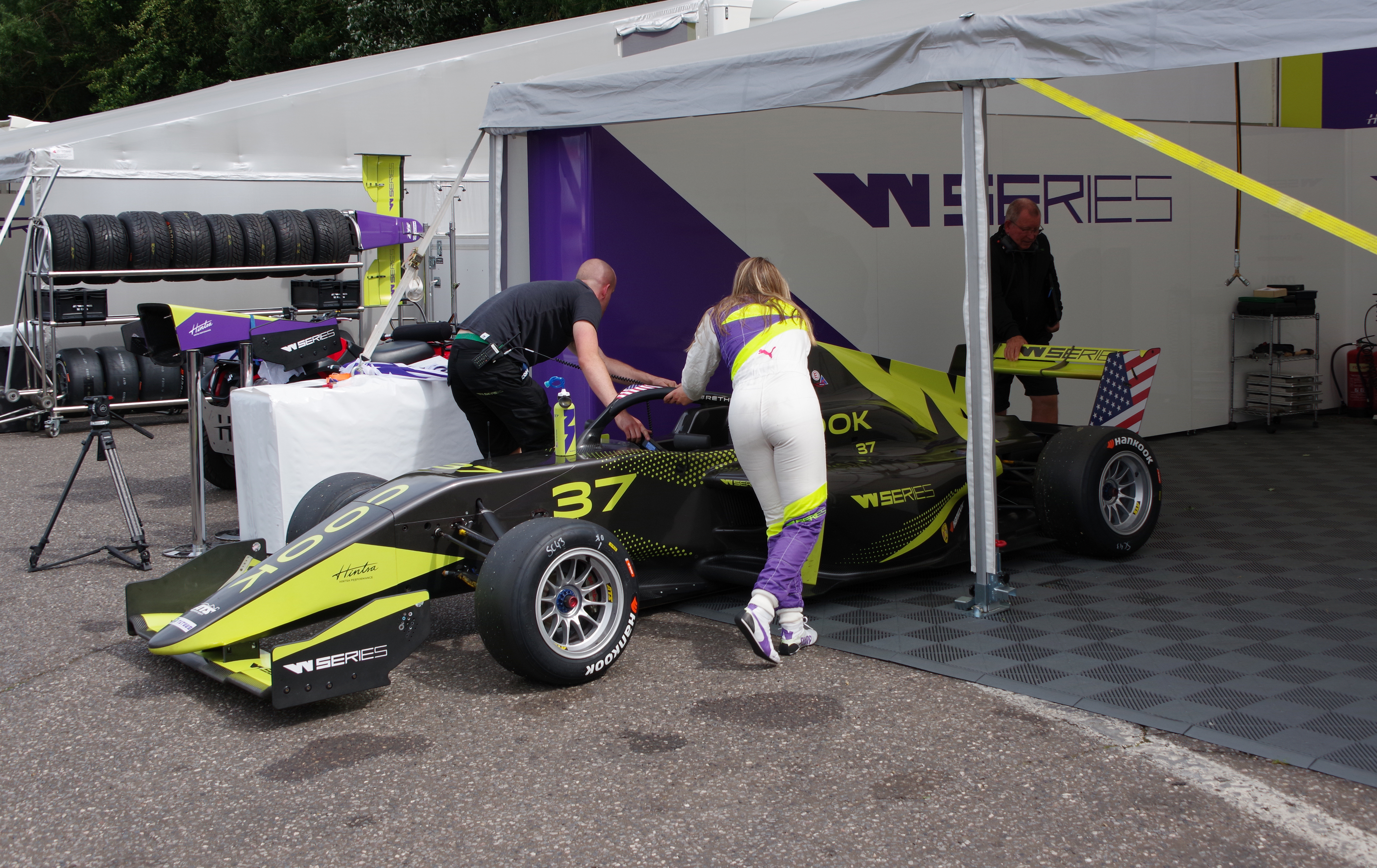
The Tatuus–Alfa Romeo F3 T-318 car of Sabré Cook is pushed into the paddock.

=== Specifications ===
The W Series featured mechanically identical cars. In 2018, it was announced that the inaugural 2019 season would use the Tatuus-Alfa Romeo F3 T-318, originally homologated by the FIA for use in Formula 3 before becoming Formula Regional, powered by Autotecnica Motori-tuned Alfa Romeo 1.8-litre turbocharged engines, and equipped with a halo cockpit safety device. Hankook would go on to supply tyres for all three seasons.

For 2022, to keep the carbon footprint as low as possible by using sea freight, the Toyota Racing Series shipped 18 Tatuus–Toyota F3 FT-60 cars to the Barcelona round in May and the Singapore round in October.

- Chassis construction: Carbon-fibre monocoque
- Engine displacement: 1,750 cc (107 cu in) DOHC inline-4
- Aspiration: Single-turbocharged
- Fuel delivery: Direct fuel injection
- Fuel capacity: 45.5 litres (12 US gal)
- Fuel: Aral Ultimate 102 RON unleaded
- Tires: Hankook Ventus F200 (slicks) + Ventus Z217 (wets)
- Weight: 565 kg (1,246 lb)
- Power output: 270 hp (201 kW)
- Width: 1,850 mm (73 in)
- Wheelbase: 2,900 mm (114 in)
- Gearbox: Sadev 6-speed paddle-shift gearbox + 1 reverse
- Steering: Power-assisted rack-and-pinion

=== Rotation policy ===
As all cars were run by one team, W Series implemented a chassis and engineer swap system that took on different forms each season. In 2019, drivers would be randomly drawn a chassis and an engineer at every event, but drivers who failed to finish a race at the previous event were required to keep their chassis from that event. With the introduction of commercial entrants in 2021, each driver would retain their engineer and chassis; however, the drivetrain from the top three cars in the previous race would be swapped with three randomly-drawn cars that finished between sixth and fourteenth place to maintain equal competition. As the series used two different types of chassis in 2022, only engineers were swapped between drivers that season.

== Champions ==
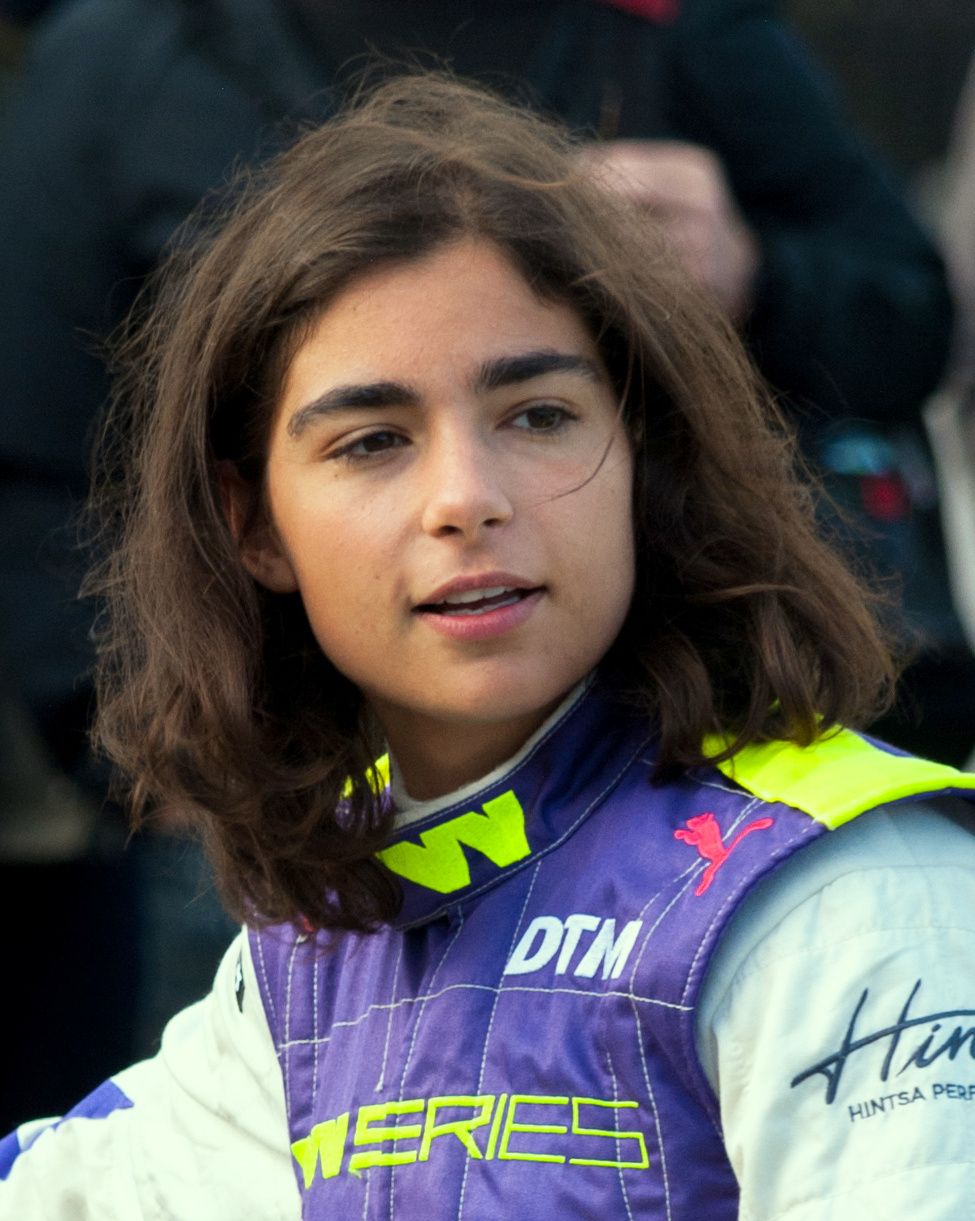
Three time series champion Jamie Chadwick.

Season	Driver	Poles	Wins	Podiums	Fastest laps	Points	Clinched	Margin	Ref
2019	(United Kingdom) Jamie Chadwick	3	2	5	0	110	Race 6 of 6	10	
2020	Not held due to COVID-19 pandemic								
2021	(United Kingdom) Jamie Chadwick	4	4	7	3	159	Race 8 of 8	27	
2022	(United Kingdom) Jamie Chadwick	3	5	6	3	143	Race 7 of 7	50	

== Circuits ==
- **Bold** denotes a current Formula One Circuit.
- Italic denotes a former Formula One Circuit.

Number	Countries, Circuits	Years
1	(Germany) Hockenheimring	2019
2	(Belgium) Circuit Zolder	2019
3	(Italy) Misano World Circuit	2019
4	(Germany) Norisring	2019
5	(Netherlands) TT Circuit Assen	2019
6	(United Kingdom) Brands Hatch	2019
7	**(Austria) Red Bull Ring**	2021
8	**(United Kingdom) Silverstone Circuit**	2021–2022
9	**(Hungary) Hungaroring**	2021–2022
10	**(Belgium) Circuit de Spa-Francorchamps**	2021
11	**(Netherlands) Circuit Zandvoort**	2021
12	**(United States) Circuit of the Americas**	2021
13	**(United States) Miami International Autodrome**	2022
14	**(Spain) Circuit de Barcelona-Catalunya**	2022
15	(France) Circuit Paul Ricard	2022
16	**(Singapore) Marina Bay Street Circuit**	2022

== Funding structure ==
The championship was free to enter; competitors were not required to bring any sponsorship.

The championship offered a total prize fund of US$1.5 million, with the series champion receiving a top prize of $500,000, and the remaining $1 million being divided among the rest of the drivers.

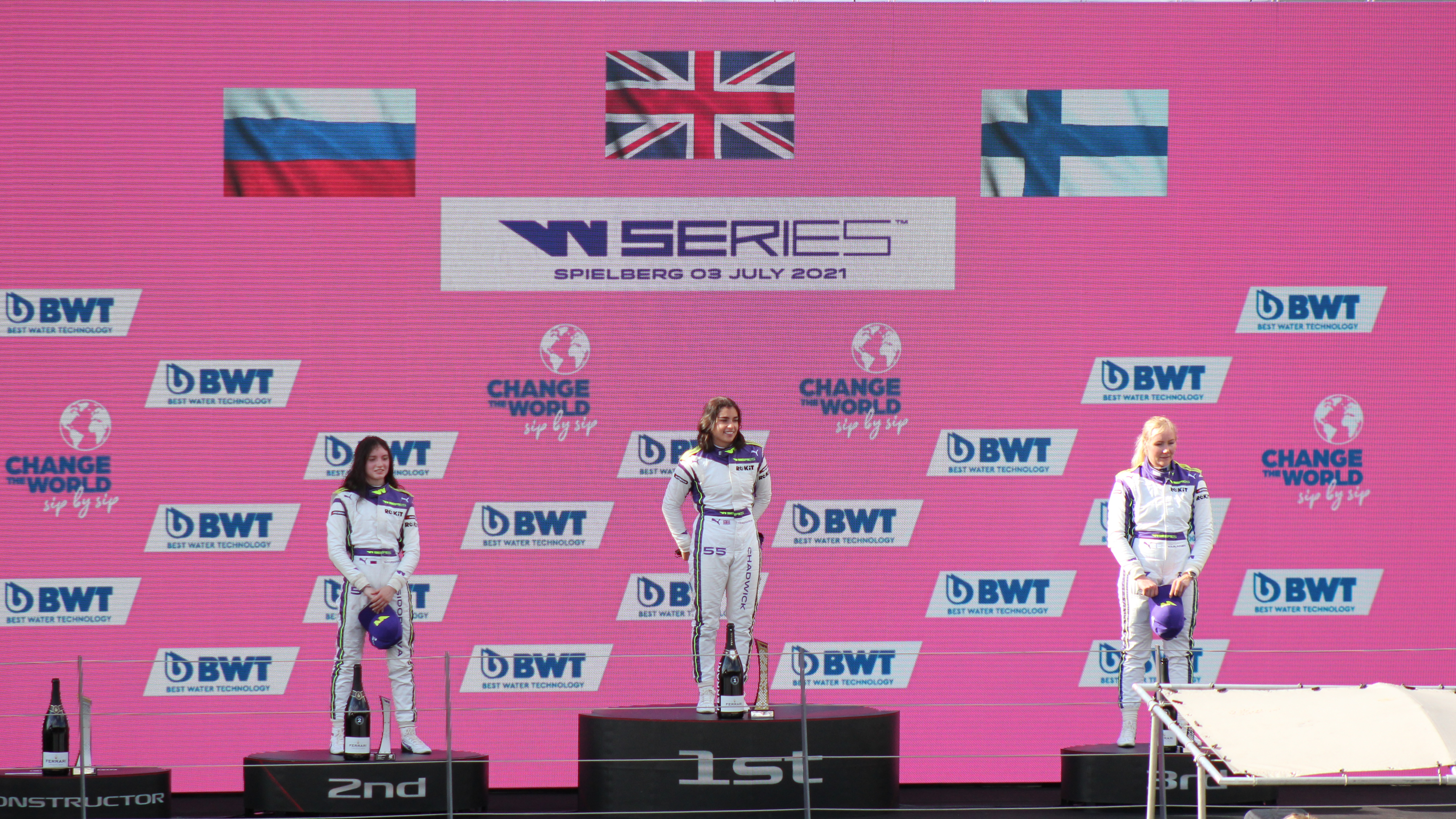
The podium at the 2021 W Series Spielberg round 2.

Pos.	Prize money
1st	$500,000
2nd	$250,000
3rd	$125,000
4th	$100,000
5th	$90,000
6th	$80,000
7th	$70,000
8th	$60,000
9th	$50,000
10th	$40,000
11th	$30,000
12th	$25,000
13th	$20,000
14th	$15,000
15th	$7,500
16th	$7,500
17th	$7,500
18th	$7,500
Reserves	$7,500

== Media coverage ==
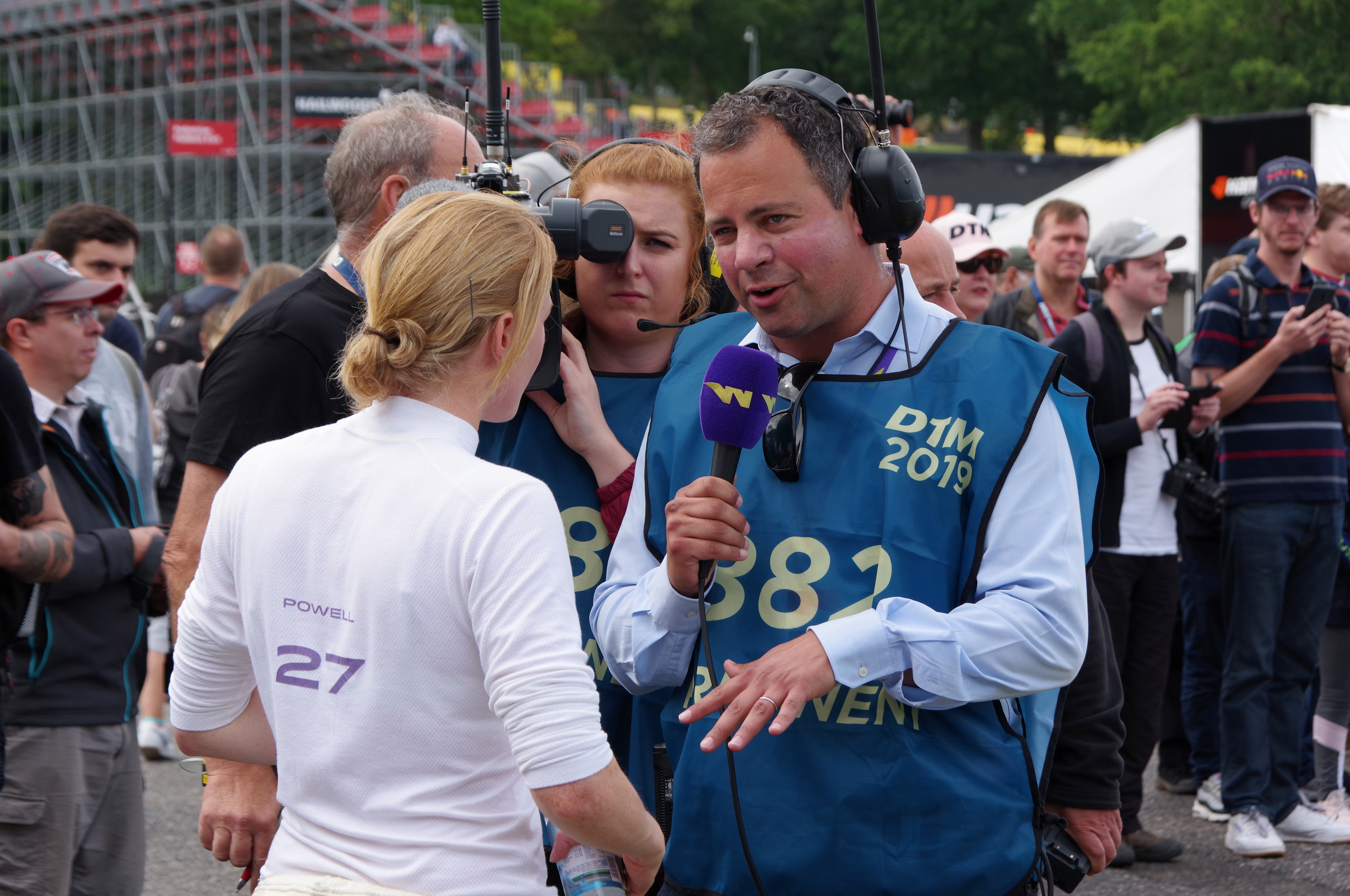
Ted Kravitz interviewing Alice Powell.

W Series race coverage was initially available on Channel 4 in the UK. The show was presented by long-time F1 journalist and sports presenter Lee McKenzie, who shared the duties with fellow presenter Anna Woolhouse. Claire Cottingham held the position of lead commentator for the first season, with expert analysis from former Formula One drivers David Coulthard and Allan McNish on a rotating basis and both Ted Kravitz and Amy Reynolds acting as pit-lane/paddock reporters. For 2021, Cottingham and Coulthard/McNish were replaced with Channel 4's Formula One commentator Alex Jacques and double-amputee racer Billy Monger respectively, with 2019 W Series driver Naomi Schiff added to the line-up as a feature presenter. Both Jacques and Monger were forced to miss the opening two rounds of 2021 after Monger tested positive for COVID-19, and were replaced with Ben Edwards and Coulthard respectively.

In May 2022, Sky Sports UK announced it had obtained exclusive live broadcast rights for three years, including a broadcast partnership with Sky Italia. In the UK, Channel 4 showed only race highlights, with the exception of the Silverstone race, for which it showed live coverage alongside Sky. Jacques held onto his lead commentary role for races, with Monger and Schiff rotating between roles as expert analysts and pit reporters – Schiff's role growing to covering practice sessions alongside guest analysis from W Series hires including reserve driver Ayla Ågren and the series' head of communications Charlotte Sefton.

In June 2021, a six-part documentary on the 2019 season titled Driven was launched on UK Channel 4's on-demand service. Modelled on Formula 1: Drive to Survive, media outlets lamented the docuseries as a missed opportunity given extremely limited release and its airing towards the end of the COVID-19 pandemic.

=== List of broadcasters ===
W Series races were live-streamed on Facebook, YouTube and/or Twitter in countries without television broadcasts.

Network	Session/s	Country/Region
Astro Supersport	Qualifying and Race	Brunei, Malaysia
Auto TV	Race	Ukraine
BeIN Sports	Race	Algeria, Bahrain, Chad, Djibouti, Egypt, Iran, Iraq, Jordan, Kuwait, Lebanon, Libya, Mauritania, Morocco, Oman, Palestine, Qatar, Saudi Arabia, Somalia, South Sudan, Sudan, Syria, Tunisia, Yemen
Canal+ Sport	Race	France, Kenya, Myanmar, Vietnam
Channel 4	Qualifying and Race	United Kingdom (2019, 2021)
Cosmote Sport	Race	Greece
DAZN	Race	Japan
ESPNU	Qualifying and Race	United States
Eurosport India	Race	Bangladesh, Bhutan, India, Myanmar, Nepal, Pakistan, Sri Lanka
Facebook	All	Rest of World
GoTV	Race	Malta
Match TV	Race	Armenia, Azerbaijan, Belarus, Georgia, Kazakhstan, Moldova, Russia, Tajikistan, Turkmenistan, Uzbekistan
PCCW	Race	Hong Kong
RDS Info	Race	Canada
SABC	Race	South Africa
SBS On Demand	Qualifying and Race	Australia
SingTel Mio Sports 2	Race	Singapore
Sky	Race	New Zealand
Sky Deutschland	Qualifying and Race	Austria, Germany, Italy (South Tyrol only), Liechtenstein, Luxembourg, Switzerland
Sky Italia	Race	Italy
Sky Sports	Qualifying and Race	United Kingdom (2022)
SporTV	Race	Brazil
SPOTV	Race	China, Hong Kong, Malaysia, Singapore, South Korea
Star+	Race	Antigua and Barbuda, Argentina, Bahamas, Barbados, Chile, Colombia, Costa Rica, Ecuador, Grenada, Mexico, Nicaragua, Paraguay, Peru, Trinidad and Tobago, Uruguay, Venezuela
SuperSport Motorsports	Race	Angola, Botswana, Cameroon, Central African Republic, Chad, Congo DR, Ethiopia, Gambia, Ghana, Ivory Coast, Kenya, Malawi, Mozambique, Namibia, Nigeria, Rwanda, Senegal, Somalia, Zimbabwe
Teledeporte	Race	Spain
The Sports Network	Race	Canada
Tipik	Race	Belgium
Twitch	All	Rest of World
Viaplay	Race	Denmark, Estonia, Finland, Iceland, Latvia, Lithuania, Norway, Poland, Sweden
YouTube	All	Rest of World
Ziggo Sport	Race	Netherlands

== Criticism ==
The W Series faced criticism since it was publicly announced, with opponents of the series claiming the category segregated female racers rather than promoting them through inclusion in established series.

British IndyCar Series driver Pippa Mann responded to the series’ announcement on Twitter, saying "What a sad day for motorsport. Those with funding to help female racers are choosing to segregate them as opposed to supporting them. I am deeply disappointed to see such an historic step backwards take place in my life time."

Mann's views on segregation were echoed by transgender driver Charlie Martin, who stated "This series is founded on segregation, and while it may create opportunities for some female drivers, it sends a clear message that segregation is acceptable. We don’t discriminate in sport based on race, so it is particularly jarring that we feel it is acceptable to do so based on gender in 2018. As racers, we want to compete against the best drivers – regardless of age, race, sexual orientation or gender – and prove we are the best at what we do."

Former Formula E and ex-Sauber F1 test driver Simona de Silvestro has suggested that the $1.5 million prize fund would be better invested in a scholarship system to support the development of talent across a wider range of motorsport disciplines. "If there’s really that much money going into the series, there are a few girls that have been pretty competitive in junior series. It seems like everyone is just struggling to get the shot. If you look at a Red Bull affiliation or a Mercedes affiliation, somehow these kids always get into the best teams and then they’re winning. I think, personally, it would have been better to do something like the Red Bull programme and make sure some girls get an opportunity on a really good team."

Claire Williams, at that time deputy team principal of the Williams Formula One team, was initially highly critical of the series, and felt it was analogous to segregation; however she later retracted this statement, and praised the series for promoting women in motorsports.

Sophia Flörsch was an outspoken critic of W Series for the duration of its existence. Upon the series launch in 2018, she claimed that she "agree[d] with the arguments, but I totally disagree with the solution." After the series' first races in 2019, she labelled it "not the way to help women in motorsport" and racing in it as "a step back on a sporting level." Flörsch then criticised the eSports series held in 2020, calling it "a joke" and "segregation behind a computer." She renewed her criticism after the series restarted in 2021, stating that 28-year-olds Alice Powell and Sarah Moore as well as 23-year-old Fabienne Wohlwend (podium-placers at the opening round of the season) stood "no chance [of] compete[ing] against men in higher classes" due to their age, and that the drivers were "just too slow." In 2022, she took aim at the centralised team structure, claiming that "the organiser decides everything." Upon confirmation of the series' financial problems, Flörsch claimed that the series' vehicles were not running identical parts to save costs, and that the series was instead manufacturing results to maintain the illusion of parity. In 2024, after the championships' collapse, Abbie Eaton claimed that some of Flörsch's arguments were "completely deluded" and that "a lot of the time it's her dad posting on her social media".

== Legacy ==
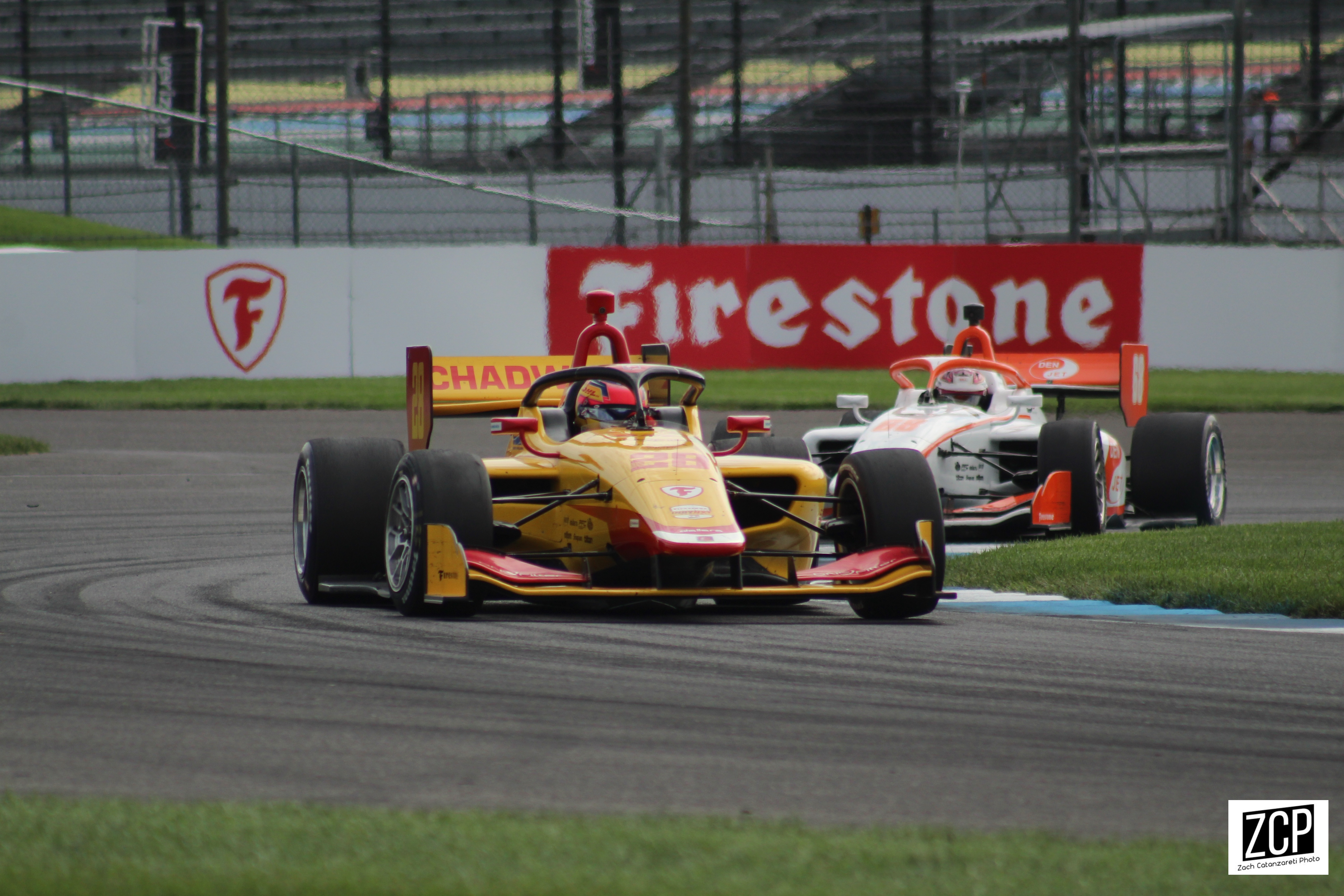
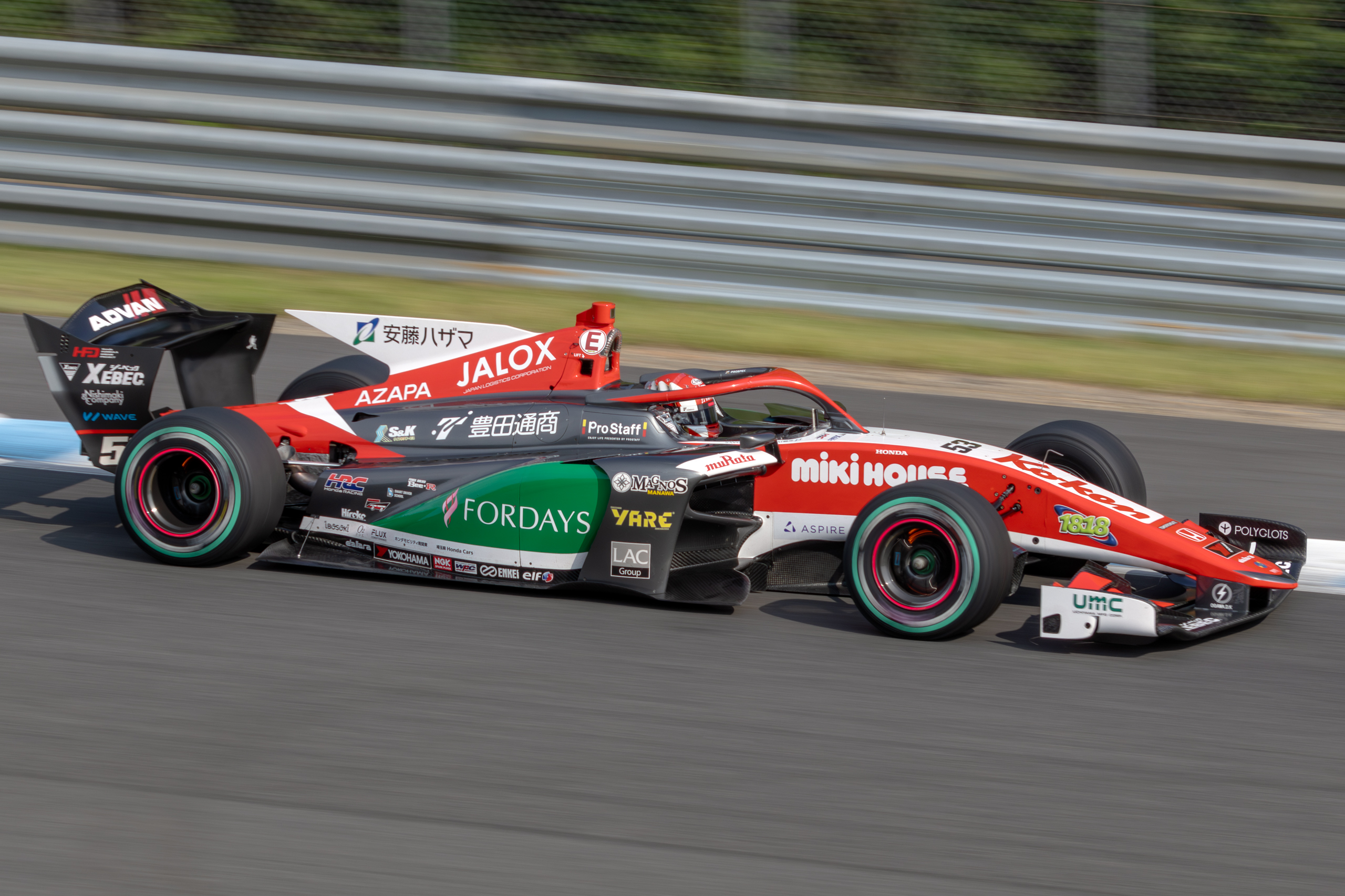
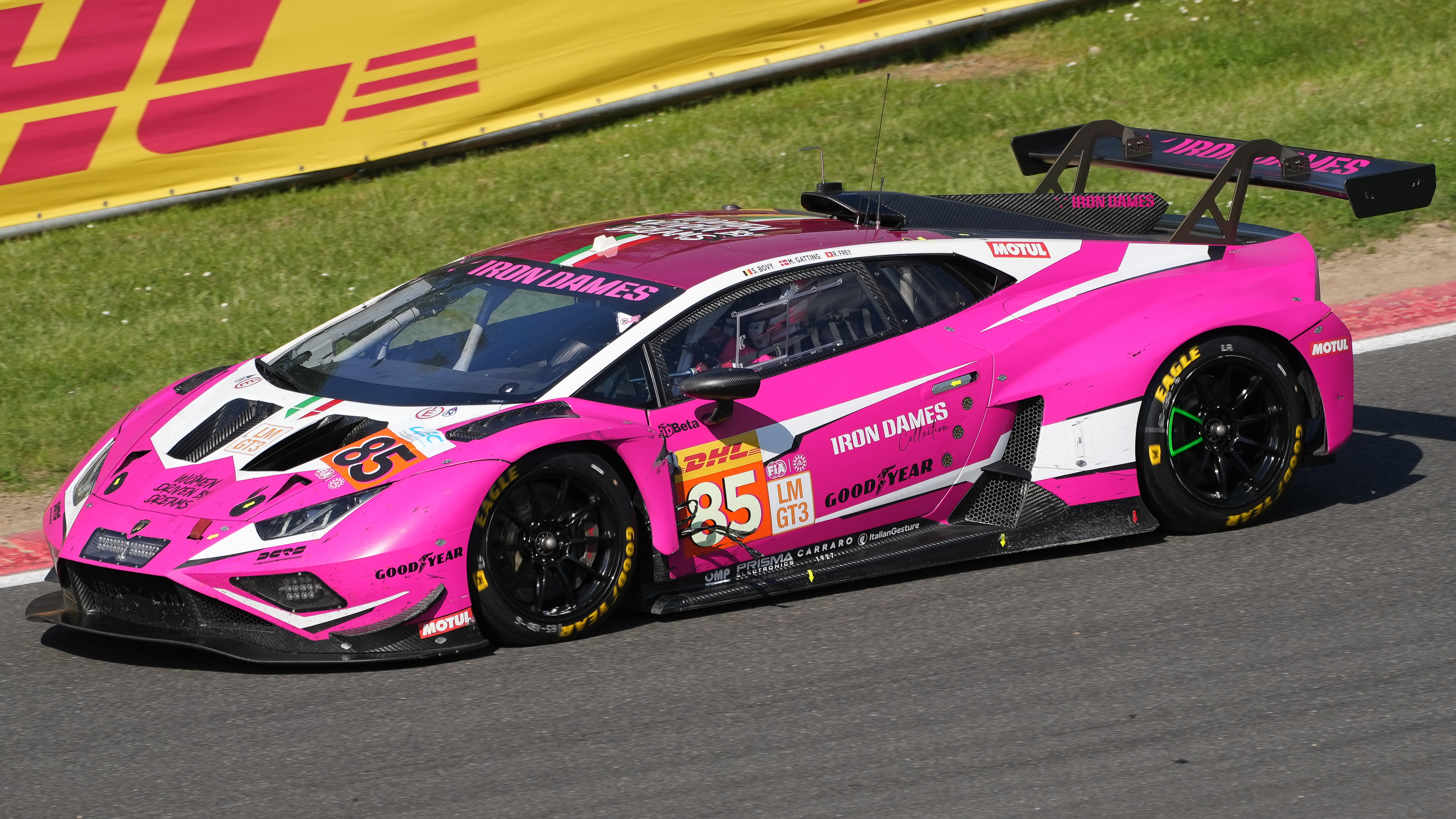
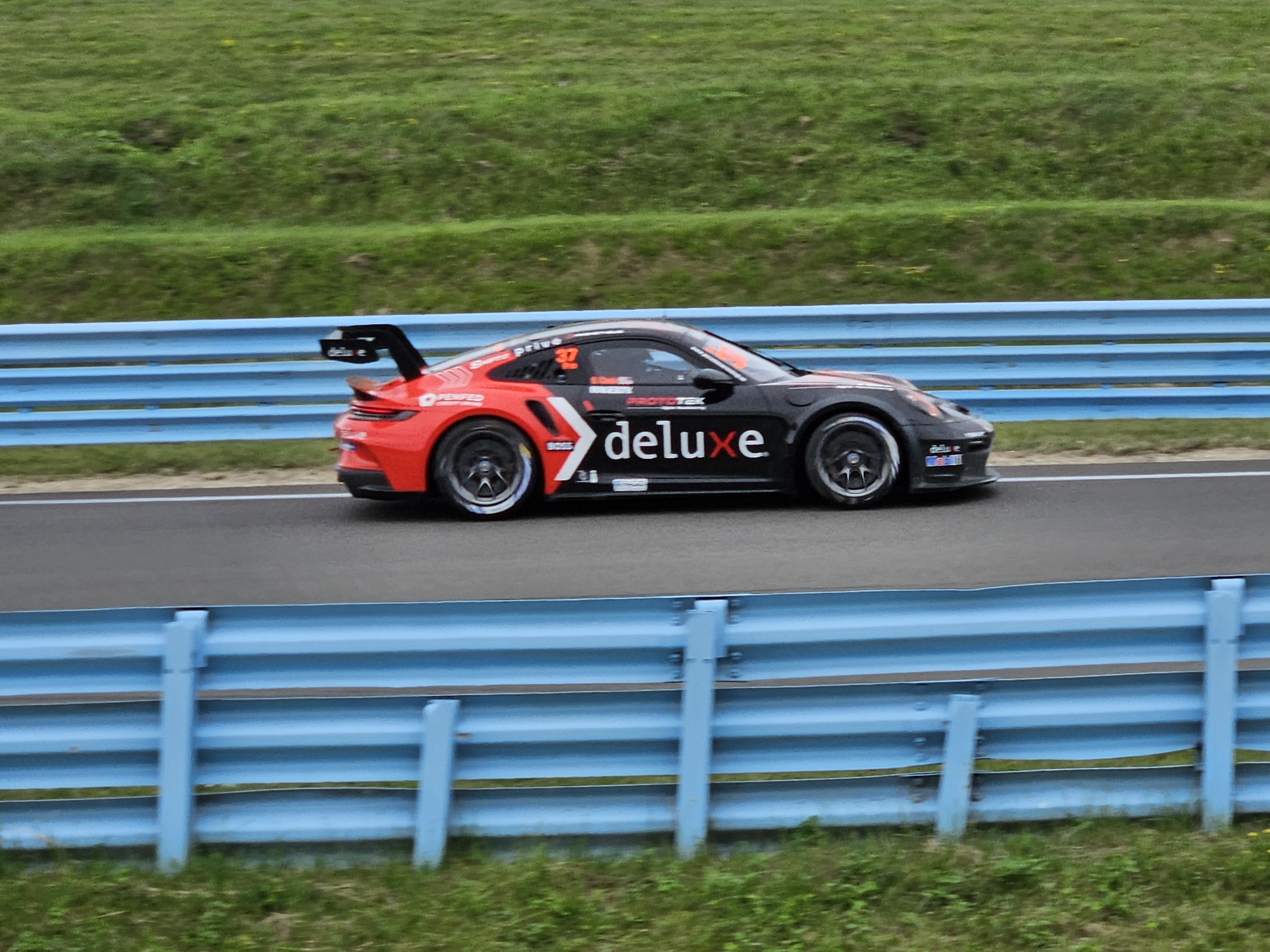
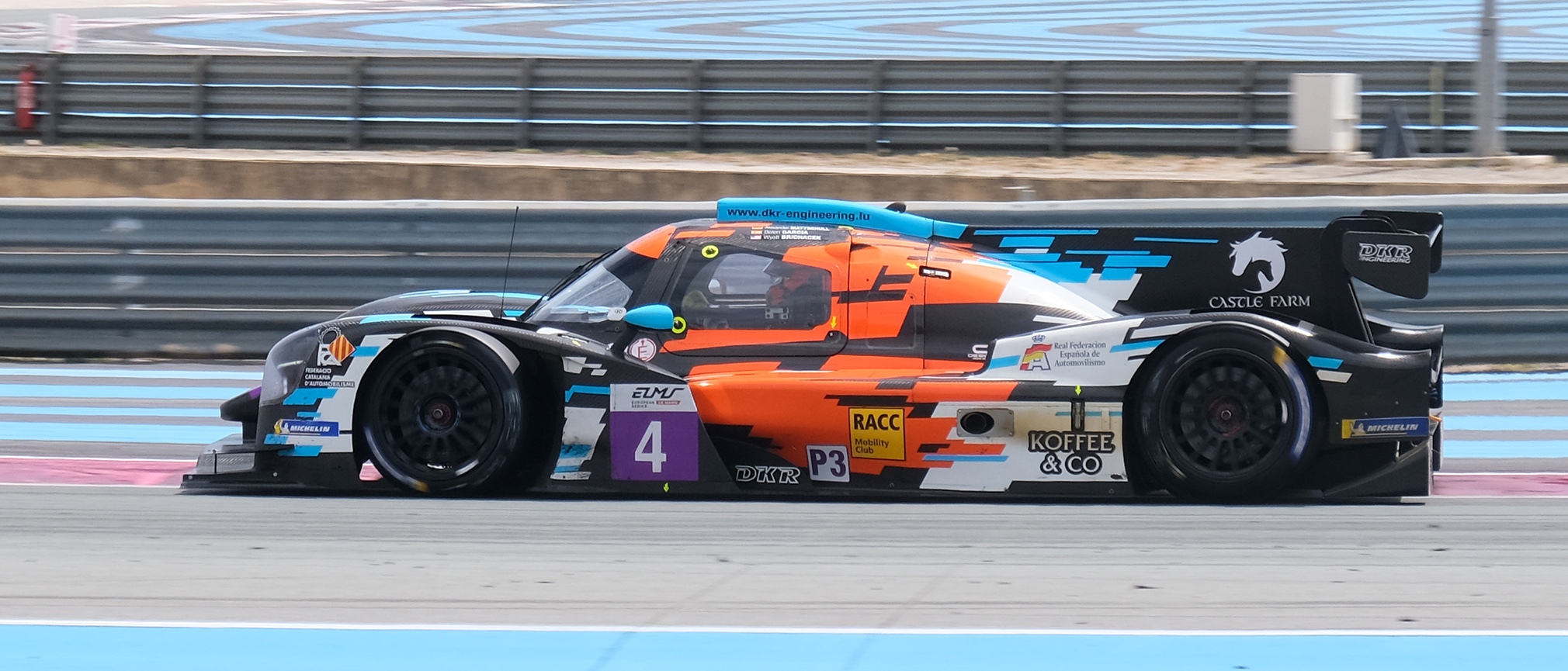
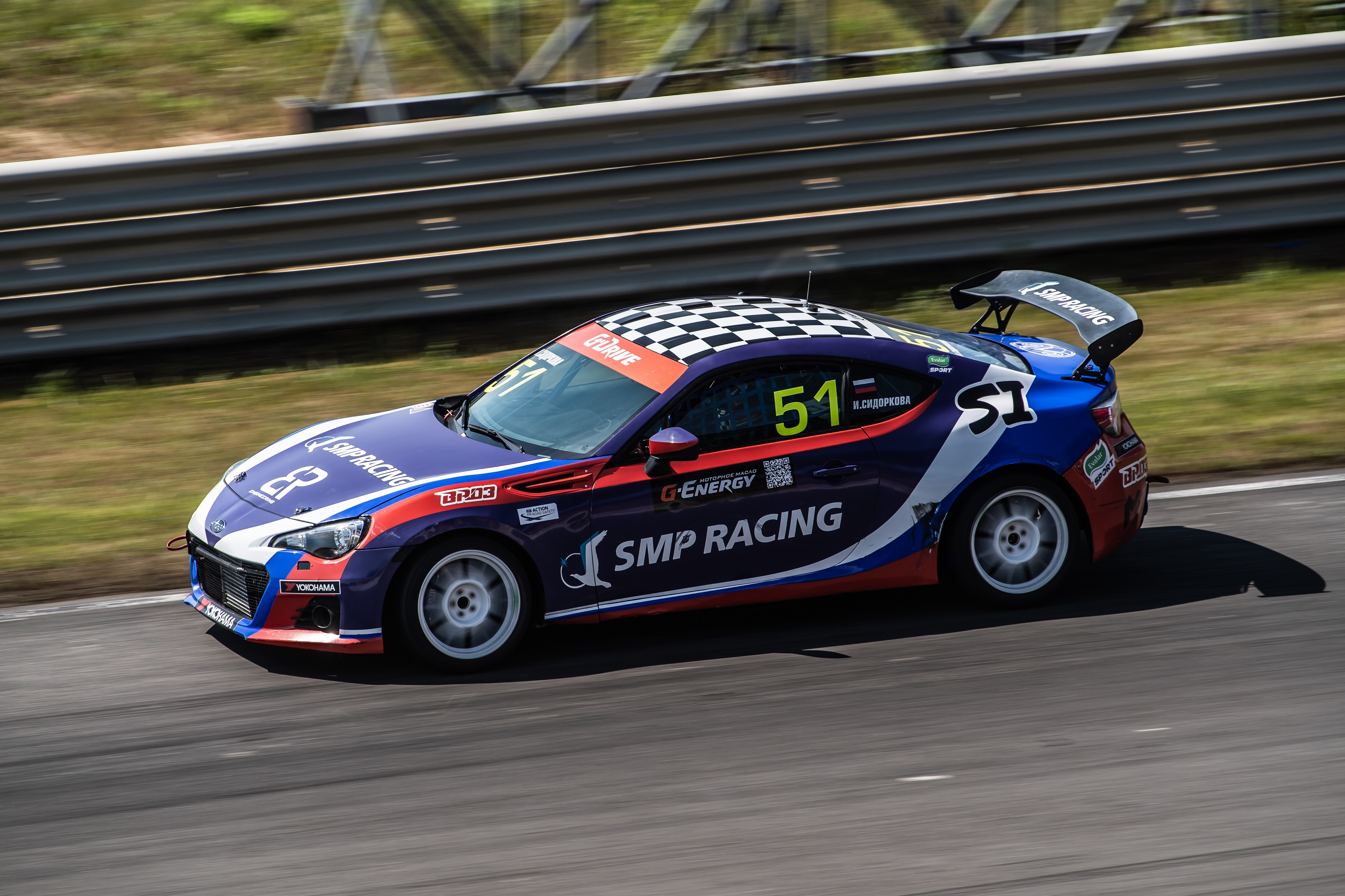
The majority of W Series' alumni moved into other open-wheel series (TL Jamie Chadwick in Indy NXT, TR Juju Noda in Super Formula) or endurance racing (ML Sarah Bovy in WEC, MR Sabré Cook in Carrera Cup, BL Belén García in ELMS, BR Irina Sidorkova in RCRS).

A number of drivers were signed to Formula One programs. Jamie Chadwick was invited into the Williams Driver Academy, Jessica Hawkins was hired as an Aston Martin ambassador and Abbi Pulling became an affiliate driver of the Alpine Academy. Chadwick also went on to compete in Indy NXT and Hawkins in the British Touring Car Championship. Pulling, Bianca Bustamante, Emely de Heus, Marta García, Megan Gilkes and Nerea Martí all fell back to the Formula 4-level F1 Academy series, with García and Pulling winning the inaugural and 2024 championships, respectively. Chloe Chambers and Miki Koyama found success in other Formula Regional categories, with Chambers winning a race in the 2023 Formula Regional Oceania Championship before also falling back to F1 Academy, and Koyama winning the 2022 Formula Regional Japanese Championship. Juju Noda also remained in open-wheelers, moving to Euroformula Open and later Super Formula.

Alice Powell, who had not raced for five years before applying to W Series, made a cameo in the IMSA SportsCar Championship alongside Katherine Legge before stepping back from driving to become a mentor for the Alpine Academy and work as a television pundit, the latter a path also taken by Naomi Schiff. Beitske Visser went on to race LMP2 in the European Le Mans Series and FIA World Endurance Championship for Signatech in an all-female team alongside Tatiana Calderón and Sophia Flörsch, including two starts at the 24 Hours of Le Mans. 2019 reserve driver Sarah Bovy also moved into WEC, competing as the nominated amateur driver in Iron Lynx Motorsport Lab's Iron Dames project, and Belén García moved into prototype racing.

Bruna Tomaselli and Irina Sidorkova returned to race in their home countries through the Stock Series and the RSKG Endurance Championship respectively. Sabré Cook became a Porsche North America development driver, competing in the 2023 Porsche Carrera Cup North America. Esmee Hawkey contested one-and-a-bit seasons of Deutsche Tourenwagen Masters for Lamborghini before quitting motorsport, becoming an influencer and starting a family. Fabienne Wohlwend switched to ADAC GT4 Germany, and Caitlin Wood moved across to the Nürburgring Endurance Series.

== See also ==
- Formula Woman, an all-female sports car UK championship
- F1 Academy, a female-only Formula 4 championship
- Kyojo Cup

Awards
Preceded by FIA (halo)	Autosport; Pioneering and Innovation Award; 2019	Succeeded by 24 Hours of Le Mans Virtual
