= PRC WPR60 Turbo =

Prototype race car

- Category: CN
- Constructor: PRC

Technical specifications
- Chassis: Carbon-fiber composite monocoque covered in pre-peg fiberglass HP composite body panels
- Suspension (front): Double wishbones, pushrod with mono-shock absorber system, and torsion-bar springs, anti-roll bar
- Suspension (rear): Double wishbones, pushrod with mono-shock absorber system and coils springs, anti-roll bar
- Length: 4,250 mm (167 in)
- Width: 1,800 mm (71 in)
- Height: 1,050 mm (41 in)
- Wheelbase: 2,600 mm (102 in)
- Engine: Audi 2.0 L (122 cu in) DOHC inline-4 engine turbocharged, longitudinally mounted in a mid-engined, rear-wheel drive layout Renault F4 RS 2.0 L (122 cu in) DOHC inline-4 engine naturally aspirated, longitudinally mounted in a mid-engined, rear-wheel drive layout BMW P65 4.0 L (244 cu in) DOHC V8 engine naturally aspirated, longitudinally mounted in a mid-engined, rear-wheel drive layout
- Transmission: Hewland NMT 6-speed semi-automatic sequential gearbox
- Power: 200–530 hp (149–395 kW); 222–470 N⋅m (164–347 lb⋅ft)
- Weight: 530–680 kg (1,168–1,499 lb) including driver
- Fuel: Various unleaded control fuel
- Lubricants: Various
- Brakes: Brembo ventilated carbon brake discs, 6-piston calipers, and pads
- Tyres: Various

Competition history
- Debut: 2014

The PRC WPR60 Turbo is a sports prototype race car, designed, developed and built by Austrian company PRC, conforming to FIA CN rules and regulations, since 2014.
