= Formula Regional =

Formula Regional "FR" logo

Formula Regional (FR) is an FIA-approved moniker for certified regional one-make Formula Three championships with the concept being approved during the FIA World Motor Sport Council meeting in December 2017. The first series under new regulations were launched in Asia and North America in 2018, followed by European counterpart in 2019 and Japanese in 2020. On 13 December 2022, the Toyota Racing Series was rebranded as the Formula Regional Oceania Championship.

This step of the FIA Global Pathway ladder serves to close the performance gap between Formula 4 (160 bhp) and global Formula 3 Championship (380 bhp), being powered by 270 bhp engines.

== Name ==
Created under the name Regional Formula 3 by the FIA within the Article 275 / Appendix J of the international sporting code, the category had, at its beginning few championships having the F3 mention in their official title.

All of the category's championships certified by FIA got gradually rebranded by its commercial moniker "Formula Regional" in order to avoid confusion with previous Formula 3 regulations (pre-2018) and with the "International" Formula 3 (the FIA Formula 3 Championship and FIA Formula 3 World Cup). The category itself was formally renamed as Formula Regional in the 2024 technical regulations.

== Cars ==
Manufacturer	Model	Image	Debut
Dome	F111/3		2020
Ligier	JS F3		2019
Tatuus	F.3 T-318		2018
Tatuus	F3 T-326		2026
Tatuus	FR-19		2019
Tatuus	FT-60		2020

== Performance ==
Formula Regional cars were intended to represent a midpoint in performance between Formula 4 and FIA Formula 3 cars.

According to drivers who have driven in both series, Formula Regional cars are of similar weight to FIA Formula 3, but have much less downforce as well as less power.

As a basis for comparison, at the 2024 Formula Regional race at Circuit de Spa-Francorchamps, the fastest race lap was 2:16.505, while the fastest race lap in the FIA Formula 3 race meeting held at the same track in 2024 was 2:05.770. The 2024 French Formula 4 Championship had a round at the same track; the fastest race lap recorded at that meeting was 2:22.539.

== Championships ==
Series name	Region	Active years	Chassis	Engine
FIA Formula Regional series
Formula Regional Americas Championship	North America	2018–present	Ligier JS F3	Honda 2.0 L
Formula Regional European Championship	Europe	2019–present	Tatuus F.3 T-318 (2019–2020); Tatuus FR-19 (2021–2025); Tatuus T-326 (2026–present)	Alfa Romeo 1.75 L (2019–2020); Renault Sport 1.8 L (2021–2025); Autotecnica 1.6 L (2026–present)
Formula Regional Japanese Championship	Japan	2020–present	Dome F111/3	Alfa Romeo 1.75 L
Formula Regional Oceania Championship	New Zealand	2020^{A}–present	Tatuus FT-60	Toyota 2.0 L
Formula Regional Middle East Championship	Middle East	2023–present	Tatuus F.3 T-318 (2023–2025); Tatuus T-326 (2026–present)	Alfa Romeo 1.75 L (2019–2020); Autotecnica 1.6 (2026–present)
FIA Formula Regional World Cup	Macau	2024–present	Tatuus F.3 T-318	Alfa Romeo 1.75 L
Other series using FIA Formula Regional regulations
Ultimate Cup Series	France	2020–present	Tatuus F3 T-318	Renault Sport 1.8 L
Eurocup-3	Europe	2023–2025	Tatuus F.3 T-318	Alfa Romeo 1.75 L
Planned FIA Formula Regional series
Formula Regional Indian Championship	India	TBC	Tatuus F.3 T-318	Alfa Romeo 1.75 L
AU3 Championship	Australia	2026–	Tatuus FT-60	Toyota 2.0 L
Former series using FIA Formula Regional regulations
Formula Regional Asian Championship	Asia	2018–2022	Tatuus F.3 T-318	Alfa Romeo 1.75 L
Formula Renault Eurocup	Europe	2019^{B}–2020	Tatuus FR-19	Renault Sport 1.8 L
W Series	International	2019, 2021–2022	Tatuus F.3 T-318; Tatuus FT-60 ^{C}	Alfa Romeo 1.8 L Toyota 2.0 L ^{C}

Notes

- ^A: Launched in 2005 as the Toyota Racing Series. The series adopted Formula Regional regulations in 2020, and became an FIA-certified Formula Regional championship in 2023.
- ^B: Launched in 1991. The series adopted Formula Regional regulations in 2019.
- ^C: For two rounds in 2022.
