= Tatuus F3 T-318 =

Italian open-wheel race car

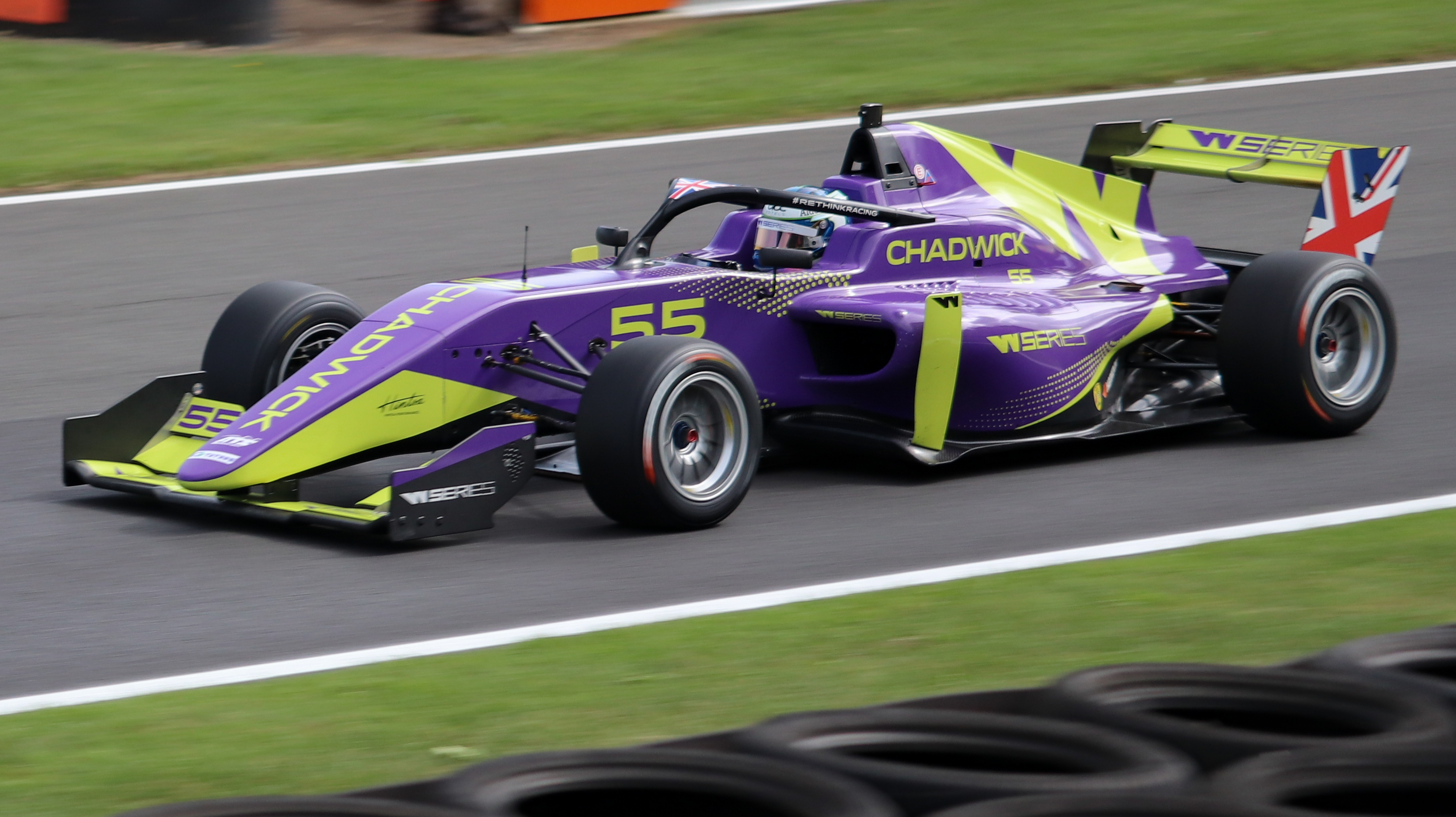
- Jamie Chadwick driving the F3 T-318 during the 2019 Brands Hatch W Series round
- Category: FIA Formula Regional; W Series; Eurocup-3 (modified)
- Constructor: Tatuus
- Successor: Tatuus T-326

Technical specifications
- Chassis: Carbon-fiber monocoque, fiberglass body
- Suspension (front): Push-rod with Koni twin non-adjustable shock absorbers, adjustable anti-roll bar and third element
- Suspension (rear): Push-rod with Koni twin non-adjustable shock absorbers, adjustable anti-roll bar and third element
- Length: 4,850 mm (191 in)
- Width: 1,850 mm (73 in)
- Height: 955 mm (38 in)
- Axle track: 1,510 mm (59 in) (front); 1,460 mm (57 in) (rear)
- Wheelbase: 2,750 mm (108 in)
- Engine: (W Series) Alfa Romeo TBi/Autotecnica 1.742 L (106 cu in) DOHC inline-4 turbocharged, longitudinally mounted in a mid-engined, rear-wheel drive layout (Formula Regional European Championship) Nissan MR18DDT (Renault M5Pt) 1.797 L (110 cu in) DOHC inline-4 turbocharged
- Transmission: Sadev SLR82-14 6-speed semi-automatic sequential gearbox
- Power: 200 kW (270 hp)
- Weight: 665 kg (1,466 lb) including driver
- Fuel: Various unleaded control fuel
- Lubricants: Various
- Brakes: Brembo 4-piston calipers Ventilated aluminum brake discs
- Tyres: Various

Competition history
- Debut: 2018

The Tatuus F3 T-318 is an open-wheel formula race car, designed, developed and built by Italian manufacturer Tatuus, used in various Formula 3 regional categories, as well as the W Series, since 2018.
