= Nürburgring =

Race track in Nürburg, Rhineland-Palatinate, Germany

- Configuration for GP-Strecke (2002–present)

- Configuration for 24 Hours Circuit – Combined GP Circuit without Mercedes-Arena (2002–present)
- Location: Nürburg, Rhineland-Palatinate, Germany
- Coordinates: 50°20′08″N 6°56′51″E
- Capacity: 150,000
- FIA Grade: 1 (GP); 2 (3 layouts); 3 (Combined); 6R (Rallycross)
- Major events: Current: GT World Challenge Europe (2014–2016, 2019–2021, 2023–present); DTM (2000–present); Nürburgring 24 Hours (1970–present); NLS (1977–present); European Truck Racing Championship ADAC Truck-Grand-Prix (1986–2019, 2022–present); Former: Formula One; German Grand Prix (intermittently, 1951–2013); European Grand Prix (1984, 1995–1996, 1999–2007); Luxembourg Grand Prix (1997–1998); Eifel Grand Prix (2020); FIA WEC 6 Hours of Nürburgring (2015–2017); FIA World Rallycross Championship World RX of Germany (2021–2022); WTCR Race of Germany (2015–2022); Grand Prix motorcycle racing German motorcycle Grand Prix (intermittently, 1955–1997); World SBK (1998–1999, 2008–2013); FIM EWC (1977–1985, 2001); ELMS 1000km Nürburgring (2004–2009); FIA GT (1997, 2001); World Sportscar Championship (1953, 1956–1984, 1986–1991)
- Website: https://nuerburgring.de

GP-Strecke (2001–present)
- Surface: Asphalt
- Length: 5.1480 km (3.1988 mi)
- Turns: 15
- Race lap record: 1:28.139 ( (Netherlands) Max Verstappen, Red Bull Racing RB16, 2020, F1)

Sprint Circuit (2002–present)
- Surface: Asphalt
- Length: 3.629 km (2.255 mi)
- Turns: 12
- Race lap record: 1:19.322 ( (Japan) Kimiya Sato, Lola B05/52, 2014, Auto GP)

Oldtimer Circuit (2002–present)
- Surface: Asphalt
- Length: 4.569 km (2.839 mi)
- Turns: 12
- Race lap record: 1:36.325 ( (United Kingdom) Martin Stretton, Tyrrell 012, 2018, F1)

24 Hours Circuit – Combined GP Circuit without Mercedes-Arena (2002–present)
- Surface: Asphalt/concrete
- Length: 25.378 km (15.769 mi)
- Turns: 170
- Race lap record: 8:08.006 ( (Germany) Daniel Keilwitz, Ferrari 296 GT3, 2023, GT3)

Nordschleife (1983–present)
- Surface: Asphalt/concrete
- Length: 20.832 km (12.944 mi)
- Turns: 154
- Race lap record: 6:25.91 ( (West Germany) Stefan Bellof, Porsche 956, 1983, Group C)

GP-Strecke with F1 Chicane (1995–2001)
- Surface: Asphalt
- Length: 4.556 km (2.831 mi)
- Turns: 12
- Race lap record: 1:18.354 ( (Colombia) Juan Pablo Montoya, Williams FW23, 2001, F1)

GP-Strecke without F1 Chicane (1984–2001)
- Surface: Asphalt
- Length: 4.542 km (2.822 mi)
- Turns: 12
- Race lap record: 1:21.533 ( (Italy) Teo Fabi, Jaguar XJR-14, 1991, C1)

Nordschleife (1971–1982)
- Surface: Asphalt/concrete
- Length: 22.835 km (14.189 mi)
- Turns: 160
- Race lap record: 7:06.4 ( (Switzerland) Clay Regazzoni, Ferrari 312T, 1975, F1)

Nordschleife (1967–1970)
- Surface: Asphalt/concrete
- Length: 22.835 km (14.189 mi)
- Turns: 160
- Race lap record: 7:40.800 ( (Belgium) Jacky Ickx, Brabham BT26A, 1969, F1)

Nordschleife (1927–1966)
- Surface: Asphalt
- Length: 22.800 km (14.167 mi)
- Turns: 160
- Race lap record: 8:24.1 ( (United Kingdom) Jim Clark, Lotus 33, 1965, F1)

Südschleife (1927–1982)
- Surface: Asphalt
- Length: 7.747 km (4.814 mi)
- Turns: 27
- Race lap record: 2:38.6 ( (West Germany) Helmut Kelleners, March 707, 1970, Group 7)

Gesamtstrecke (1927–1982)
- Surface: Asphalt
- Length: 28.265 km (17.563 mi)
- Turns: 187
- Race lap record: 15:06.1 ( (Monaco) Louis Chiron, Bugatti Type35C, 1929, Grand Prix)

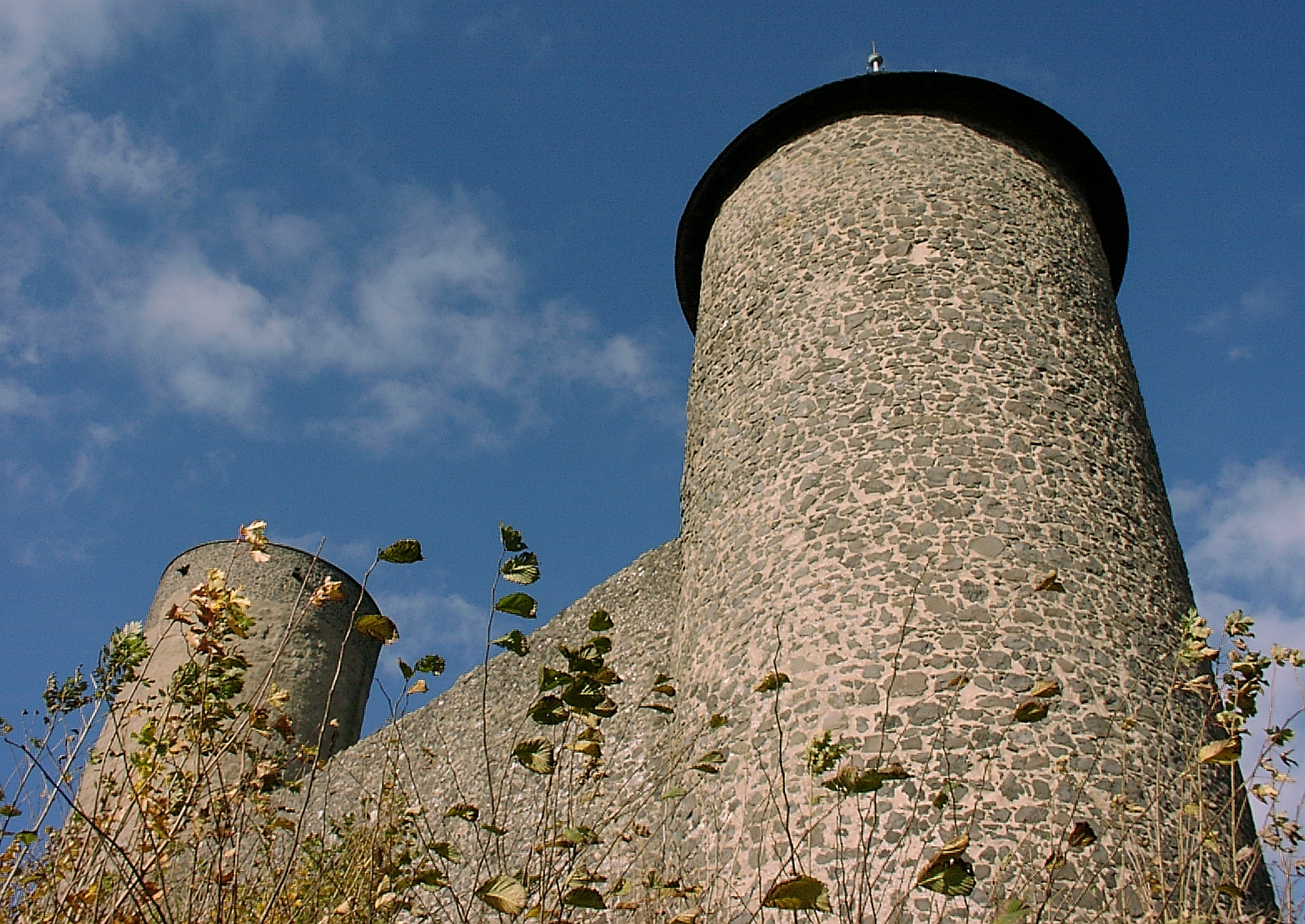
Tower of Nürburg Castle

The Nürburgring (German pronunciation: [ˈnyːɐ̯bʊʁkˌʁɪŋ]) is a 150,000-person capacity motorsports complex located in the town of Nürburg, Rhineland-Palatinate, Germany. It features a Grand Prix race track built in 1984, and a long Nordschleife configuration, (Note: lit. 'North loop') built in the 1920s, around the village and medieval castle of Nürburg in the Eifel mountains. The north loop is 20.830 km (12.943 mi) long and contains more than 300 metres (1,000 feet) of elevation change from its lowest to highest points. Scottish racing driver Jackie Stewart famously nicknamed the track "the Green Hell".

Originally, the track featured four configurations, namely the 28.265 km-long (17.563 mi) Gesamtstrecke, (Note: lit. 'Whole course') which in turn consisted of the then-22.835 km (14.189 mi) Nordschleife, and the 7.747 km (4.814 mi) Südschleife. (Note: lit. 'South loop') There was also a 2.281 km (1.417 mi) warm-up loop called Zielschleife, (Note: lit. 'Finish loop') or Betonschleife, (Note: lit. 'Concrete loop') around the pit area. Between 1982 and 1983, the start–finish area was demolished to create a new GP-Strecke, (Note: lit. 'Grand Prix course') which is now used for all major and international racing events. However, the shortened Nordschleife is still in use for racing, testing and public access.

Prior to World War II, the Nürburgring hosted 13 editions of the German Grand Prix from 1927 to 1939. In Formula One (F1), it has hosted 42 Grands Prix, including the German, European, Luxembourg, and – most recently – 2020 Eifel Grand Prix; Michael Schumacher achieved the most victories at the Nürburgring, winning on five occasions between 1995 and 2006. The 1976 German Grand Prix, held on the Nordschleife, was the last F1 race ever contested on a circuit of 10 or more kilometres (6.2 or more miles). (Note: The 22.835 km (14.189 mi) configuration was used for Formula One (F1) nine times between 1967 and 1976 (the exception was 1970). The only F1 race to ever exceed this was the 1957 Pescara Grand Prix, held on a 25.579 km (15.894 mi) circuit.) As of 2025, the venue hosts several national GT events, including the Deutsche Tourenwagen Masters.

== History ==
=== 1925–1939: The beginning of the "Nürburg-Ring" ===
In 1904, the Gordon Bennett Trophy was held on the twice-run Taunus circuit, a circuit made up of public roads starting between the towns of Wehrheim, Limburg and Saalburg, just north of Frankfurt that was 126 km (78 mi) long. In 1907, the Taunus circuit was re-routed and shortened to 117 km (73 mi), and it was used one more time for the first Eifelrennen race, which was won by Italian racer Felice Nazzaro. In the early 1920s, ADAC Eifelrennen races were held on the twisty 33.2 km (20.6 mi) Nideggen public road circuit near Cologne and Bonn.

Around 1925, the construction of a dedicated race track was proposed just south of the Nideggen circuit around the ancient castle of the town of Nürburg, following the examples of Italy's Monza and Targa Florio courses, and Berlin's AVUS, yet with a different character. The layout of the circuit in the mountains was similar to the Targa Florio event, one of the most important motor races at that time. The original Nürburgring was to be a showcase for German automotive engineering and racing talent. Construction of the track, designed by the Eichler Architekturbüro from Ravensburg (led by architect Gustav Eichler), began in September 1925.

The track was completed in the spring of 1927, and the ADAC Eifelrennen races were continued there. The first races to take place on 18 June 1927 showed motorcycles and sidecars, and were won by Toni Ulmen on an English 350cc Velocette. The cars followed a day later, and Rudolf Caracciola was the winner of the over–5000cc class in a supercharged Mercedes-Benz "K". The track was opened to the public in the evenings and on weekends, as a one-way toll road. The entire track consisted of 174 bends prior to the 1971 changes, and averaged 8 to 9 metres (8.7 to 9.8 yd) in width. The fastest time ever around the full Gesamtstrecke was by Louis Chiron, at an average speed of 112.31 km/h (69.79 mph) in his Bugatti.

In 1929 the full Nürburgring was used for the last time in major racing events, as future Grands Prix would be held only on the Nordschleife. Motorcycles and minor races primarily used the shorter and safer Südschleife. Memorable pre-war races at the circuit featured the talents of early Ringmeister (Ringmasters) such as Rudolf Caracciola, Tazio Nuvolari, and Bernd Rosemeyer.

=== 1947–1970: "The Green Hell" ===
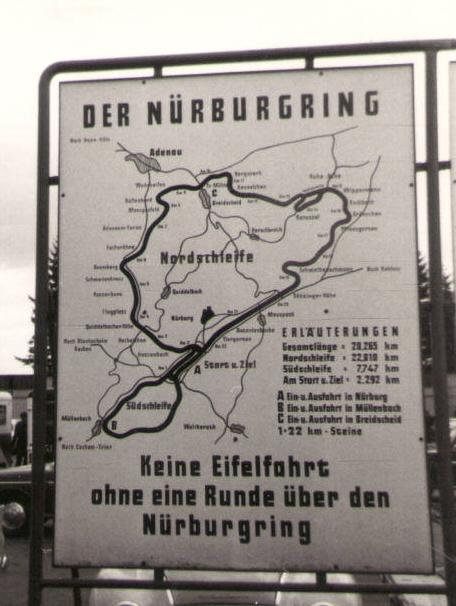
Nürburgring circuit map, taken at the 1964 German Grand Prix; the legend advises "No driving in the Eifel (mountains) without a lap on the Nürburgring".

The Nordschleife from 1927 to 1982, with small changes made in 1967 and 1971

After World War II, racing resumed in 1947, and in 1951, the Nordschleife of the Nürburgring again became the main venue for the German Grand Prix as part of the Formula One World Championship (with the exception of 1959, when it was held on the AVUS in Berlin). A new group of Ringmeister arose to dominate the race – Alberto Ascari, Juan Manuel Fangio, Stirling Moss, Jim Clark, John Surtees, Jackie Stewart and Jacky Ickx.

On 5 August 1961, during practice for the 1961 German Grand Prix, Phil Hill became the first person to complete a lap of the Nordschleife in under 9 minutes, with a lap of 8 minutes 55.2 seconds (153.4 km/h or 95.3 mph) in the Ferrari 156 "Sharknose" Formula One car. Over half a century later, even the highest performing road cars still have difficulty breaking 8 minutes without a professional race driver or one very familiar with the track. Also, several rounds of the German motorcycle Grand Prix were held, mostly on the 7.747 km (4.814 mi) Südschleife, but the Hockenheimring and the Solitudering were the main sites for Grand Prix motorcycle racing.

In 1953, the ADAC 1000 km Nürburgring race was introduced, an Endurance race and Sports car racing event that counted towards the World Sportscar Championship for decades. The 24 Hours Nürburgring for touring car racing was added in 1970.

By the late 1960s, the Nordschleife and many other tracks were becoming increasingly dangerous for the latest generation of F1 cars. In 1967, a chicane was added before the start/finish straight, called Hohenrain, in order to reduce speeds at the pit lane entry. This made the track 25 m (27 yd) longer. Even this change was not enough to keep Stewart from nicknaming it "The Green Hell" (German: Die Grüne Hölle) following his victory in the 1968 German Grand Prix amid a driving rainstorm and thick fog.

In 1970, after the fatal crash of Piers Courage at Zandvoort, the F1 drivers decided at the French Grand Prix to boycott the Nürburgring unless major changes were made, as they had done at Spa the year before. The changes were not possible on short notice, and the German GP was moved to the Hockenheimring, which had already been modified.

=== 1971–1983: Changes ===
In accordance with the demands of the F1 drivers, the Nordschleife was reconstructed by taking out some bumps, smoothing out some sudden jumps (particularly at Brünnchen), and installing Armco safety barriers. The track was made straighter, following the race line, which reduced the number of corners. The German GP could be hosted at the Nürburgring again, and was for another six years from 1971 to 1976.

In 1973 the entrance into the dangerous and bumpy Kallenhard corner was made slower by adding another left-hand corner after the fast Metzgesfeld sweeping corner. Safety was improved again later on by removing the jumps on the long main straight and widening it. They also took away the bushes right next to the track at the main straight, which had made that section of the Nürburgring dangerously narrow. A second series of three more F1 races was held until 1976.

However, primarily due to its length of over 22 km (14 mi), and the lack of space due to its situation on the sides of the mountains, increasing demands by the F1 drivers and the FIA's CSI commission were too expensive or impossible to meet. For instance, by the 1970s the German Grand Prix required five times the marshals and medical staff as a typical F1 race, something the German organizers were unwilling to provide. Even with the 1971 modifications it was still possible for cars to become airborne off the track. The Nürburgring was also unsuitable for the burgeoning television market; its vast expanse made it almost impossible to effectively cover a race there. As a result, early in the season it was decided that the 1976 race would be the last to be held on the old circuit.

Niki Lauda, the reigning world champion and only person ever to lap the full 22.835 km (14.189 mi) Nordschleife in under seven minutes (6:58.6, 1975), proposed to the other drivers that they boycott the circuit in 1976. Lauda was concerned about the safety arrangements and the lack of marshals around the circuit, and did not like the prospect of running the race in another rainstorm. Usually when that happened, some parts of the circuit were wet and other parts were dry, which is what the conditions of the circuit were for that race.

The other drivers voted against the idea and the race went ahead. Lauda crashed in his Ferrari coming out of the left-hand kink before Bergwerk after a new magnesium component (lighter but more fragile than aluminum used until then) on his Ferrari's rear suspension failed. He was badly burned as his car was still loaded with fuel in lap 2. Lauda was saved by the combined actions of fellow drivers Arturo Merzario, Guy Edwards, Brett Lunger, Emerson Fittipaldi and Harald Ertl.

The crash also showed that the track's distances were too long for regular fire engines and ambulances, even though the "ONS-Staffel" was equipped with a Porsche 911 rescue car, marked (R). The old Nürburgring never hosted another F1 race again, as the German Grand Prix was moved to the Hockenheimring for 1977. The German motorcycle Grand Prix was held for the last time on the old Nürburgring in 1980, also permanently moving to Hockenheim.

By its very nature, the Nordschleife was impossible to make safe in its old configuration. It soon became apparent that it would have to be completely overhauled if there was any prospect of Formula One returning there - the Nürburgring's administration and race organizers were not willing to provide the enormous expense of providing the number of marshals needed for a Grand Prix - up to six times the amount that most other circuits needed. With this in mind, in 1981 work began on a 4.556 km-long (2.831 mi) new circuit, which was built on and around the old pit area.

At the same time, a bypass shortened the Nordschleife to 20.832 km (12.944 mi), and with an additional small pit lane, this version was used for races in 1983, e.g. the 1000km Nürburgring endurance race, while construction work was going on nearby. During qualifying for that race, Stefan Bellof set a lap of 6:11.13 for the 20.832 km (12.944 mi) Nordschleife in his Porsche 956, or 199.8 km/h (124.1 mph) on average. This lap held the all-time record for 35 years (partially because no major racing has taken place there since 1984) until it was surpassed by Timo Bernhard in the Porsche 919 Hybrid Evo, which ran the slightly longer version of the circuit in 5:19.546- averaging 233.8 km/h (145.3 mph) on 29 June 2018.

Meanwhile, more run-off areas were added at corners like Aremberg and Brünnchen, where originally there were just embankments protected by Armco barriers. The track surface was made safer in some spots where there had been bumps and jumps. Racing line markers were added to the corners all around the track as well. Also, bushes and hedges at the edges of corners were replaced with Armco and grass.

The former Südschleife had not been modified in 1970–1971 and was abandoned a few years later in favour of the improved Nordschleife. It is now mostly gone (in part due to the construction of the new circuit) or converted to a normal public road, but since 2005 a vintage car event has been hosted on the old track layout, including part of the parking area.

=== 1984: New Grand Prix track ===
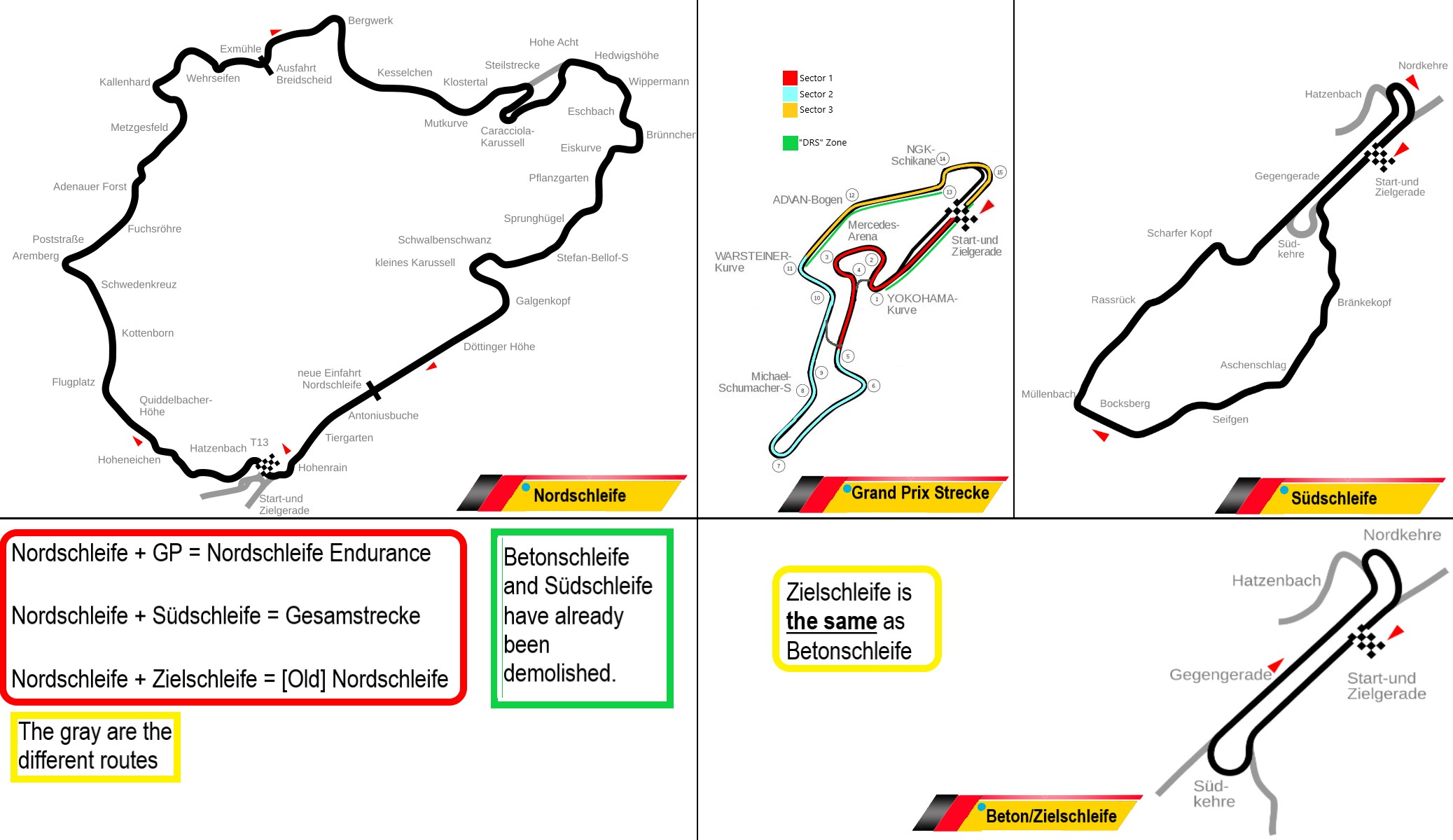
Comparison of the different old and new layouts

The 'GP Strecke' circuit layout in 1985

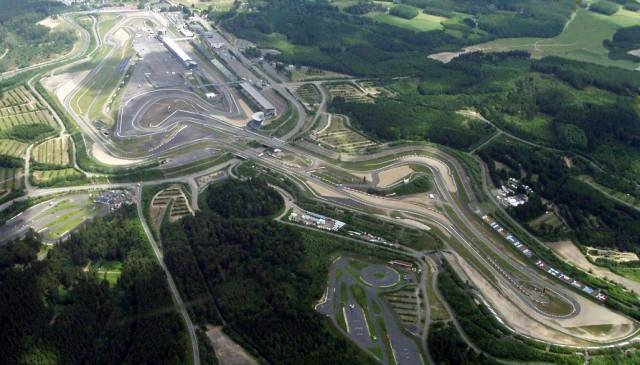
Aerial photograph of GP-Strecke

The new track was completed in 1984 and named GP-Strecke (German: Großer Preis-Strecke: literally, "Grand Prix Course"). It was built to meet the highest safety standards. However, it was considered in character a mere shadow of its older sibling. Some fans, who had to sit much farther away from the track, called it Eifelring, Ersatzring, Grünering or similar nicknames, believing it did not deserve to be called Nürburgring. Like many circuits of the time, it offered few overtaking opportunities.

Prior to the 2013 German Grand Prix both Mark Webber and Lewis Hamilton said they liked the track. Webber described the layout as "an old school track" before adding, "It's a beautiful little circuit for us to still drive on so I think all the guys enjoy driving here." While Hamilton said "It's a fantastic circuit, one of the classics and it hasn't lost that feel of an old classic circuit."

To celebrate its opening, an exhibition race was held on 12 May. The 1984 Nürburgring Race of Champions featured an array of notable drivers driving identical Mercedes 190E 2.3–16's: the line-up was Elio de Angelis, Jack Brabham (Formula 1 World Champion 1959, 1960, 1966), Phil Hill (1961), Denis Hulme (1967), James Hunt (1976), Alan Jones (1980), Jacques Laffite, Niki Lauda (1975, 1977)*, Stirling Moss, Alain Prost*, Carlos Reutemann, Keke Rosberg (1982), Jody Scheckter (1979), Ayrton Senna*, John Surtees (1964) and John Watson. [Drivers marked with * won the Formula 1 World Championship subsequent to the race]. Senna won ahead of Lauda, Reutemann, Rosberg, Watson, Hulme and Jody Scheckter, being the only one to resist Lauda's performance who – having missed the qualifying – had to start from the last row and overtook all the others except Senna. There were nine former and two future Formula 1 World Champions competing, in a field of 20 cars with 17 Formula 1 drivers including then 56 year old Hans Herrmann plus three drivers known for racing Porsche: Klaus Ludwig, Manfred Schurti and Udo Schütz.

Besides other major international events, the Nürburgring has seen the brief return of Formula One racing, as the 1984 European Grand Prix was held at the track, followed by the 1985 German Grand Prix. As F1 did not stay, other events are now the highlights at the new Nürburgring, including the 1000km Nürburgring, DTM, motorcycles, and newer types of events, like truck racing, vintage car racing at the AvD "Oldtimer Grand Prix", and even the "Rock am Ring" concerts.

Following the success and first world championship of Michael Schumacher, a second German F1 race was held at the Nürburgring between 1995 and 2006, called the European Grand Prix, or in 1997 and 1998, the Luxembourg Grand Prix.

For 2002, the track was changed, by replacing the former "Castrol-chicane" at the end of the start/finish straight with a sharp right-hander (nicknamed "Haug-Hook"), in order to create an overtaking opportunity. Also, a slow Omega-shaped section was inserted, on the site of the former kart track. This extended the GP track from 4.556 to 5.148 km (2.831 to 3.199 mi), while at the same time, the Hockenheimring was shortened from 6.823 to 4.574 km (4.240 to 2.842 mi).

Both the Nürburgring and the Hockenheimring events lost money due to high and rising Formula One licence fees charged by Bernie Ecclestone and low attendance due to high ticket prices; starting with the 2007 Formula One season, Hockenheim and Nürburgring alternated in hosting the German GP.

In Formula One, Ralf Schumacher collided with his teammate Giancarlo Fisichella and his brother at the start of the 1997 race which was won by Jacques Villeneuve. In 1999, in changing conditions, Johnny Herbert managed to score the only win for the team of former Ringmeister Jackie Stewart. One of the highlights of the 2005 season was Kimi Räikkönen's spectacular exit while in the last lap of the race, when his suspension gave way after being rattled lap after lap by a flat-spotted tyre that was not changed due to the short-lived 'one set of tyres' rule.

Prior to the 2007 European Grand Prix, the Audi S (turns 8 and 9) was renamed Michael Schumacher S after Michael Schumacher. Schumacher had retired from Formula One the year before, but returned in 2010, and in 2011 became the second Formula One driver to drive through a turn named after them (after Ayrton Senna driving his "S for Senna" at Autódromo José Carlos Pace).

=== Alternation with Hockenheim ===
In 2007, the FIA announced that Hockenheimring and Nürburgring would alternate with the German Grand Prix with Nürburgring hosting in 2007. Due to name-licensing problems, it was held as the European Grand Prix that year. In 2014, the new owners of the Nürburgring were unable to secure a deal to continue hosting the German Grand Prix in the odd-numbered years, so the 2015 and 2017 German Grands Prix were cancelled.

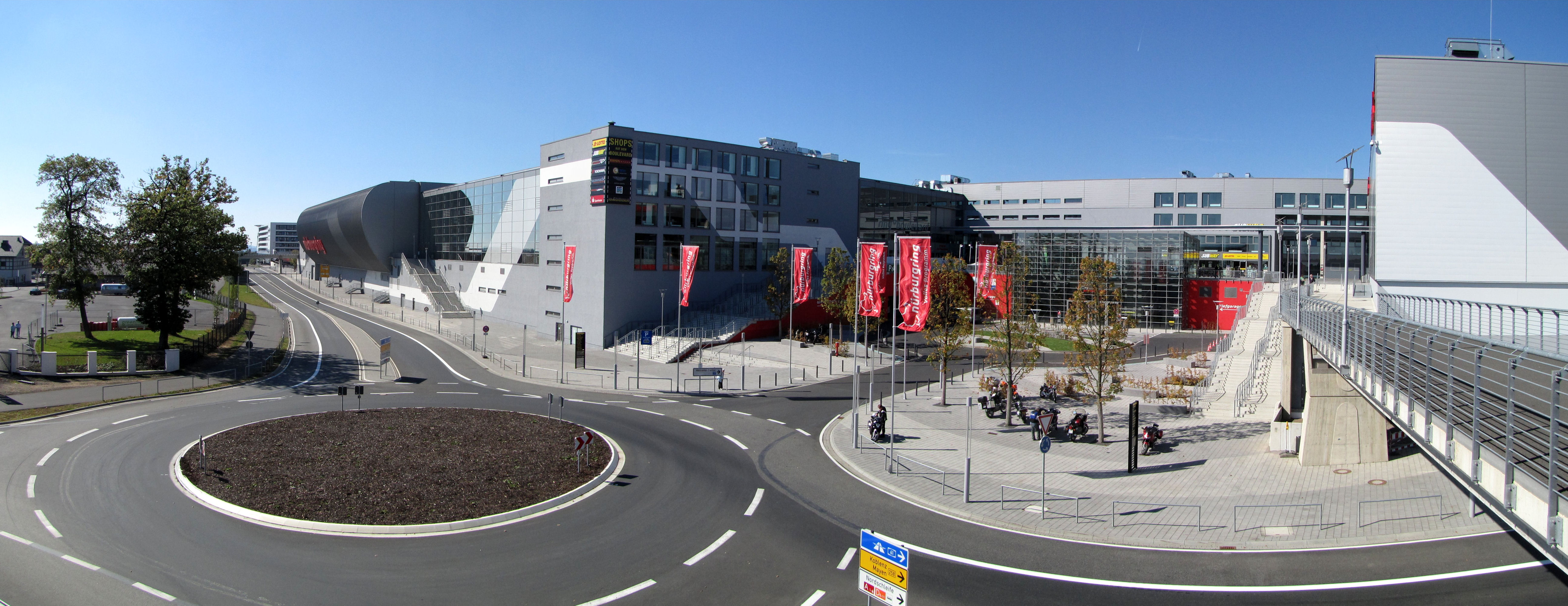
Panorama main entrance of Nürburgring

=== Return of Formula One ===
In July 2020, it was announced that after seven years, the race track would be an official Formula One Grand Prix with the event taking place from 9 to 11 October 2020. This race was called the Eifel Grand Prix in honour of the nearby mountain range, meaning the venue held a Grand Prix under a fourth different name having hosted races under the German, European and Luxembourg Grands Prix titles previously. That race was won by Lewis Hamilton, who equalled Michael Schumacher's record of wins.

=== Fatal accidents ===
While it is unusual for deaths to occur during sanctioned races, there are many accidents and several deaths each year during public sessions. It is common for the track to be closed several times a day for cleanup, repair, and medical intervention. While track management does not publish any official figures, several regular visitors to the track have used police reports to estimate the number of fatalities as between 3 and 12 in a full year. Jeremy Clarkson noted in Top Gear in 2004 that "over the years this track has claimed over 200 lives".

== Racing ==
=== Nordschleife racing today ===
Several touring car series still compete on the Nordschleife, using either only the simple 20.830 km (12.943 mi) version with its separate small pit lane, or a combined 25.378 km-long (15.769 mi) track that uses a part of the original modern F1 track (without the Mercedes Arena section, which is often used for support pits) plus its huge pit facilities. Entry-level competition requires a regularity test (GLP) for street-legal cars. Two racing series (RCN/CHC and VLN) compete on 15 Saturdays each year, for several hours.

The annual highlight is the 24 Hours Nürburgring weekend, held usually in mid-May, featuring 220 cars – from small 100 hp (75 kW) cars to 700 hp (520 kW) Turbo Porsche cars or 500 hp (370 kW) factory race cars built by BMW, Opel, Audi, and Mercedes-Benz, over 700 drivers (amateurs and professionals), and up to 290,000 spectators.

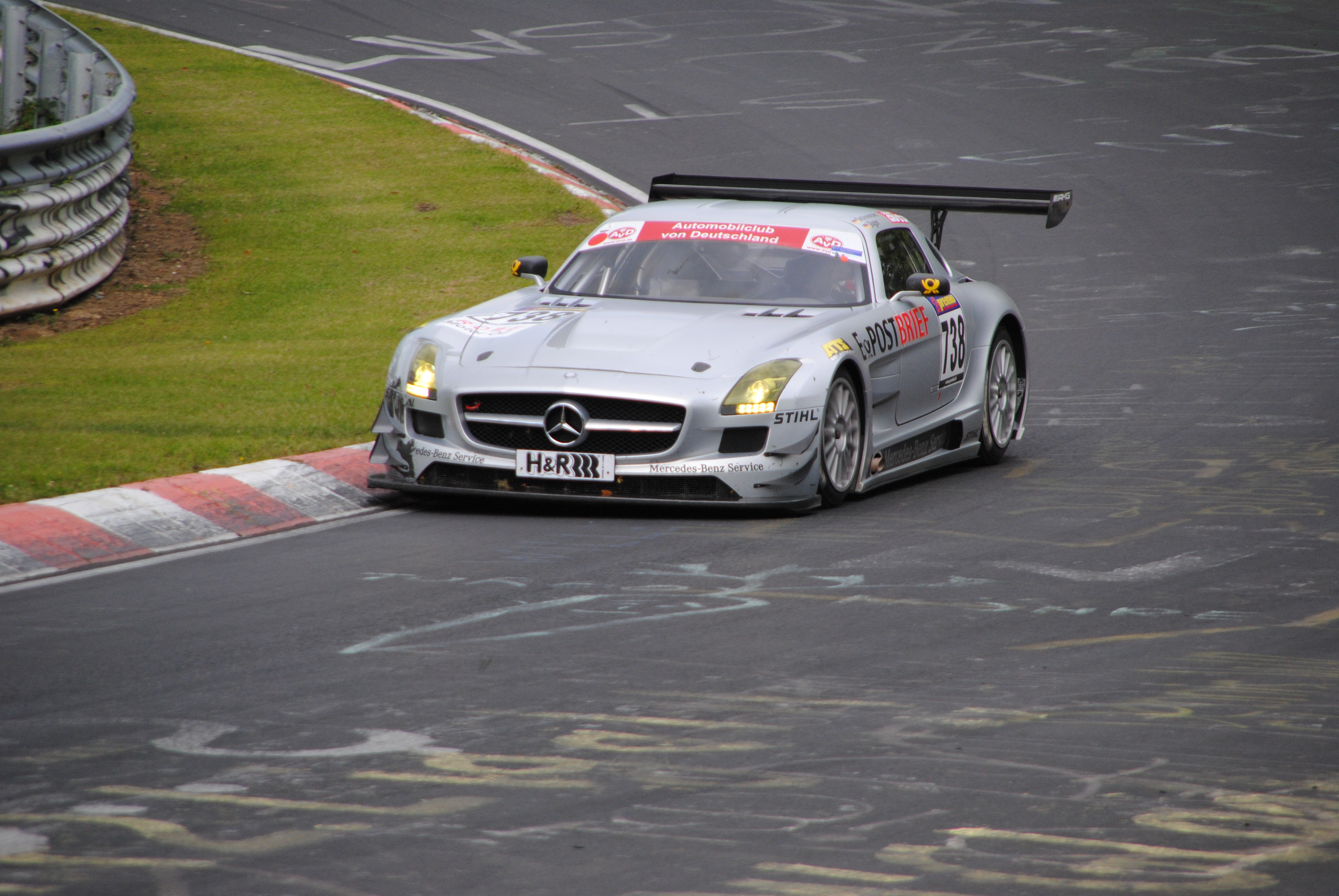
Mercedes-Benz SLS AMG GT3 racing at the Nürburgring Nordschleife VLN Race 8, 2010

As of 2015 the World Touring Car Championship holds the FIA WTCC Race of Germany at the Nordschleife as a support category to the 24 Hours.

BMW Sauber's Nick Heidfeld made history on 28 April 2007 as the first driver in over thirty years to tackle the Nürburgring Nordschleife track in a contemporary Formula One car. Heidfeld's three laps in an F1.06 were part of festivities celebrating BMW's contribution to motorsport. About 45,000 spectators showed up for the main event, the third four-hour VLN race of the season. Conceived largely as a photo opportunity, the lap times were not as fast as the car was capable of, BMW instead needing to run the chassis at a particularly high ride height to allow for the Nordschleife's abrupt gradient changes and to limit maximum speeds accordingly. Former F1 driver Hans-Joachim Stuck was injured during the race when he crashed his BMW Z4.

As part of the festivities before the 2013 24 Hours Nürburgring race, Michael Schumacher and other Mercedes-Benz drivers took part in a promotional event which saw Schumacher complete a demonstration lap of the Nordschleife at the wheel of a 2011 Mercedes W02. As with Heidfeld's lap, and also partly due to Formula One's strict in-season testing bans, the lap left many motorsport fans underwhelmed.

== Public access ==
=== Nordschleife ===
Since its opening in 1927, the track has been used by the public for the so-called Touristenfahrten: anyone with a road-legal car or motorcycle, as well as tour buses, motor homes, or cars with trailers, are able to access the Nordschleife. It is open every day from mid-March through mid-November, except when racing takes place. The track is not open to the public during the winter, when construction work is ongoing or in the event of bad weather. Passing on the right is prohibited, and some sections have speed limits; the normal traffic rules (StVO in German) apply also here.

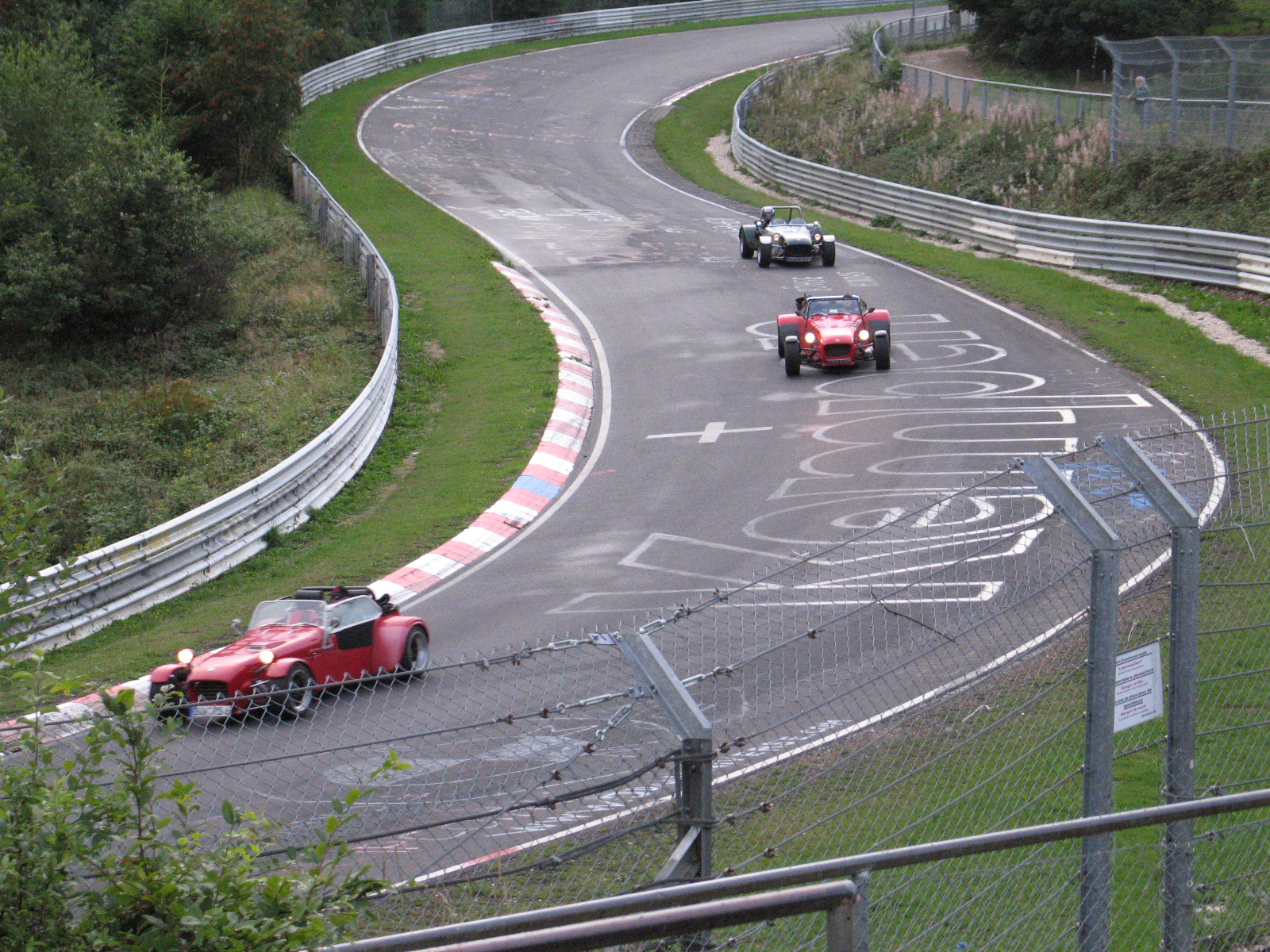
Nordschleife is often open to the public. Three Caterhams are entering Brünnchen, a spectator vantage point.

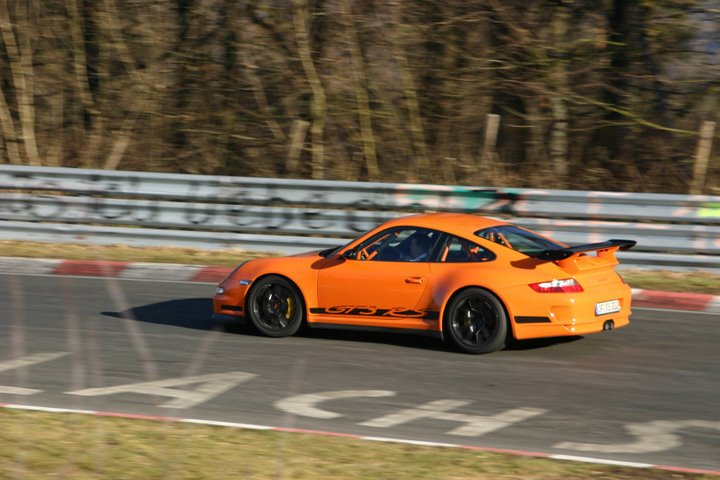
Porsche GT3 RS approaching Adenauer Forst, a blind chicane on the Nordschleife

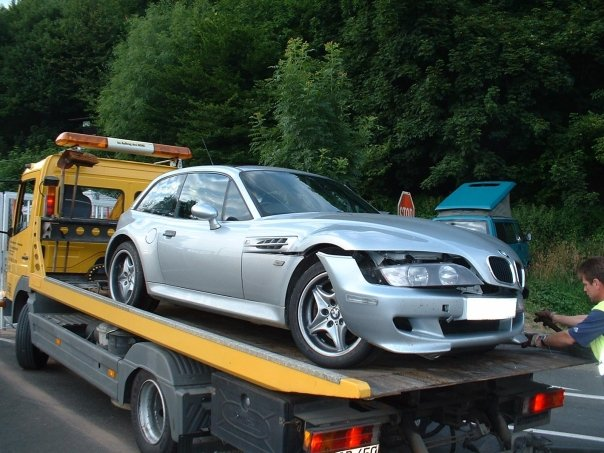
Crashed BMW Z3 M coupé on the recovery truck

The Nürburgring is a popular attraction for many driving enthusiasts and riders from all over the world, partly because of its history and the challenge it provides. The lack of oncoming traffic and intersections sets it apart from regular roads, and the absence of a blanket speed limit is a further attraction.

Normal ticket buyers on tourist days cannot quite complete a full lap of the 20.832 km (12.944 mi) Nordschleife, which bypasses the modern GP-Strecke, as they are required to slow down and pass through a 200-metre (220 yd) "pit lane" section where toll gates are installed. On busier days, a mobile ticket barrier is installed on the main straight in order to reduce the length of queues at the fixed barriers. This is open to all ticket holders. On rare occasions, it is possible to drive both the Nordschleife and the Grand Prix circuit combined.

Drivers interested in lap times often time themselves from the first bridge after the barriers to the last gantry (aka Bridge-to-Gantry or BTG time) before the exit. However, the track's general conditions state that any form of racing, including speed record attempts, is forbidden. The driver's insurance coverage may consequently be voided, leaving the driver fully liable for damage. Normal, non-racing, non-timed driving accidents might be covered by driver's insurance, but it is increasingly common for insurers to insert exclusion clauses that mean drivers and riders on the Nürburgring only have third-party coverage or are not covered at all.

Drivers who have crashed into the barriers, suffered mechanical failure or been otherwise required to be towed off track during Touristenfahrten sessions are referred to as having joined the "Bongard Club". This nickname is derived from the name of the company which operates the large yellow recovery flatbed trucks which ferry those unfortunate drivers and their vehicles to the nearest exit. Due to the high volume of traffic, there is an emphasis on quickly clearing and repairing any compromised safety measures so the track can be immediately re-opened for use.

Additionally, those found responsible for damage to the track or safety barriers are required to pay for repairs, along with the time and cost associated with personnel, equipment and track closure to address those damages, making any accident or breakdown a potentially expensive incident. Because it is technically operated as a public toll road, failing to report an accident or instance where track surfaces are affected is considered to be an instance of unlawfully leaving the scene of an accident. This is all part of the rules and regulations which aim to ensure a safe experience for all visitors to the track.

On 20 February 2025, the administration of the circuit decided to forbid motorcycles during public Touristenfahrten tourist laps starting from the opening of the 2025 season.

=== Südschleife ===
The entire Nürburgring Gesamtstrecke was open to the public from its initial opening. At several points around the circuit there were access roads and toll points from which drivers and riders could begin or end a drive. The Südschleife had one of these at the bottom of the uphill stretch near Müllenbach.

== Commercial aspects ==
=== Production car testing ===
For decades, automotive media outlets and manufacturers have used lap times on the Nordschleife as a standard to measure the performance of production vehicles. A car's time on the circuit is commonly used as a benchmark for its overall performance, and cars from disparate marques or time periods may be directly compared via their lap times. Since 2019, two times have been recorded: one for the whole length of the track, and another for a traditional, slightly truncated layout. Nordschleife test cars are piloted by experienced test drivers with intricate knowledge of the circuit, and are often variants specially prepared for circuit racing, as is the case with the Lexus LFA's "Nürburgring package".

For sixteen weeks per year, the "industry pool" (Industrie-Pool) rents exclusive daytime use of the track for automotive development and endurance testing. As of 2017 the industry pool consisted of approximately 30 car manufacturers, associations, and component suppliers. By 2019, the track was being rented by the industry pool for 18 weeks per year.

Some journalists have opined that Nordschleife testing is deleterious to a car's normal driving experience, producing cars that have sacrificed comfort and driveability in favor of better lap times. Former Top Gear host James May, who is known for his open dislike of testing run on the track, has claimed that the Nürburgring prompts designers to focus on a car's grip at the expense of pleasant-feeling handling, and creates cars that are ill-suited for real-world driving conditions. Others have expressed concern over the relevance of these test laps, which lack independent verification and may be conducted using cars significantly different from stock. Porsche is reported as having tried—and failed—to replicate the Nissan GT-R Nismo's record-breaking lap, preparing its own GT-R test car for the task, and the Lamborghini Huracán Performante's time was met with incredulity even after Lamborghini provided video documentation.

=== Television and games ===
The TV series Top Gear sometimes used the Nordschleife for its challenges, often involving Sabine Schmitz. The first corner of the Nordschleife loop was renamed as the "Sabine-Schmitz-Kurve" in Schmitz's honor after she died of cancer in 2021. In addition, during series 17 (summer 2011) of Top Gear, James May was very critical of the ride quality of cars whose development processes included testing on the Nordschleife, saying that cars which were tested at Nordschleife got ruined.

Multiple layouts of the Nürburgring have been featured in video games, such as the Gran Turismo series, the Forza Motorsport series, the Need for Speed: Shift series, Project CARS 2, iRacing and Assetto Corsa. Grand Prix Legends, a historic racing simulator also included the Nürburgring on its roster of default Grand Prix tracks.

=== Leisure development ===
Other pastimes are hosted at the Nürburgring, such as the Rock am Ring, Germany's biggest rock music festival, attracting close to 100,000 rock fans each year since 1985. Since 1978, the Nordschleife is also the venue of a major running event (Nürburgring-Lauf/Run am Ring). In 2003, a major bicycling event (Rad am Ring) was added and it became the multi-sports event Rad & Run am Ring.

In 2009, new commercial areas opened, including a hotel and shopping mall. In the summer of 2009, ETF Ride Systems opened a new interactive dark ride application called "Motor Mania" at the racetrack, in collaboration with Lagotronics B.V. The roller coaster "ring°racer" was scheduled to open in 2011, but was delayed significantly due to technical issues. It eventually opened on 31 October 2013 and was closed after just four days of operation on 3 November 2013.

=== Ownership ===
In 2012, the track was preparing to file for bankruptcy as a result of nearly $500 million in debts and the inability to secure financing. On 1 August 2012, the government of Rheinland-Pfalz guaranteed $312 million to allow the track to meet its debt obligations.

In 2013, the Nürburgring was for sale for US$165 million (€127.3 million). The sale process was by sealed-bid auction with an expected completion date of "Late Summer". This meant there was to be a new owner in 2013, unencumbered by the debts of the previous operation, with the circuit expected to return to profitability.

On 11 March 2014, it was reported that the Nürburgring was sold for 77 million euros ($106.8 million). Düsseldorf-based Capricorn Development was the buyer. The company was to take full ownership of the Nürburgring on 1 January 2015. But in October 2014, Russian billionaire, the chairman of Moscow-based Pharmstandard, Viktor Kharitonin, bought a majority stake in the Nürburgring.

In May 2015, the Nürburgring was set to hold the first Grüne Hölle Rock festival as a replacement for the Rock am Ring festival, but the project did not take place. Grüne Hölle Rock changed their name to Rock im Revier and the event was held in the Schalke area.

== Layout ==
=== Nordschleife layout ===
Nürburgring Nordschleife
- Location: Nürburg, Germany
- Coordinates: 50°20′08″N 6°56′51″E
- Website: https://nuerburgring.de

The Nordschleife operates in a clockwise direction, and was formerly known for its abundance of sharp crests, causing fast-moving, firmly-sprung racing cars to jump clear off the track surface at many locations.

==== Flugplatz ("air field", a small airport) ====
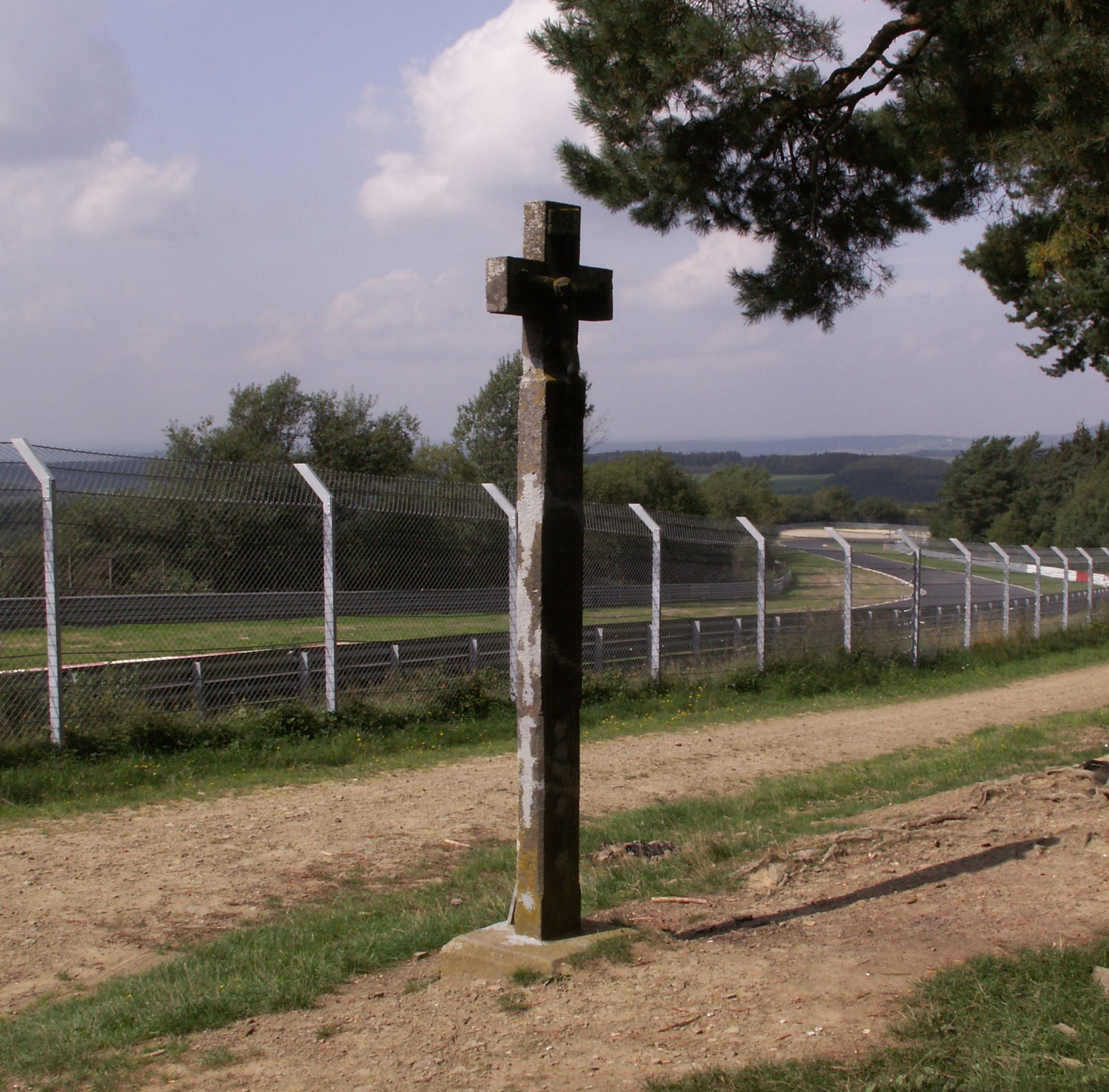
The eponym of Schwedenkreuz

Although by no means the most fearsome, Flugplatz is perhaps the most aptly (although coincidentally) named and widely remembered section. The name of this part of the track comes from a small airfield, which in the early years was located close to the track in this area. The track features a very short straight that climbs sharply uphill for a short time, then suddenly drops slightly downhill, and this is immediately followed by two very fast right-hand kinks.

Chris Irwin's career was ended following a massive accident at Flugplatz, in a Ford 3L GT sports car in 1968. Manfred Winkelhock flipped his March Formula Two car at the same corner in 1980. This section of the track was renovated in 2016 after an accident in which Jann Mardenborough's Nissan GT-R flew over the fence and killed a spectator.

The Flugplatz is an important part of the Nürburgring. After the two fast right-handers comes the fastest part of the track: a downhill straight called Kottenborn, into a quick turn called Schwedenkreuz (Swedish Cross). Drivers are flat out (full speed) for some time.

Right before the Flugplatz is Quiddelbacher-Höhe (peak, as in "mountain summit"), where the track crosses a bridge over the Bundesstraße 257.

==== Fuchsröhre ("Fox Hole") ====
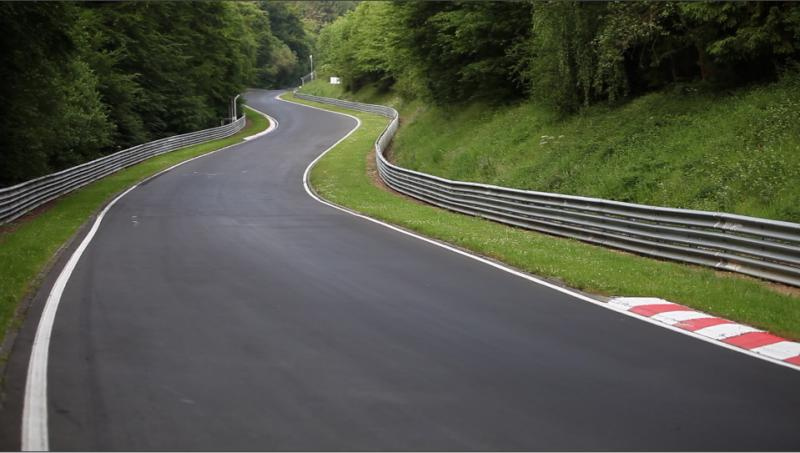
Fuchsröhre

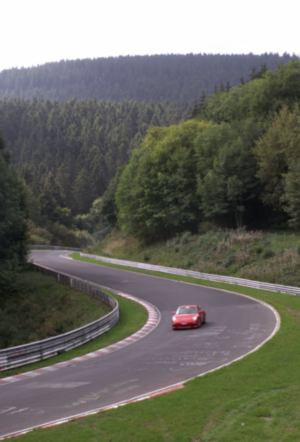
Adenauer Forst

The Fuchsröhre is soon after the very fast downhill section succeeding the Flugplatz. After negotiating a long right-hand corner called Aremberg (which is after Schwedenkreuz) the road goes under a bridge Postbrucke as it plunges downhill, and the road switches back left and right and finding a point of reference for the racing line is difficult. This whole sequence is flat out and then, the road climbs sharply uphill.

The road then turns left and levels out at the same time; this is one of the many jumps of the Nürburgring where the car goes airborne. This leads to the Adenauer Forst (forest) turns. The Fuchsröhre is one of the fastest and most dangerous parts of the Nürburgring because of the extremely high speeds in such a tight and confined place; this part of the Nürburgring goes right through a forest and there is only about 2–3 metres (6.6–9.8 ft) of grass separating the track from Armco barrier, and beyond the barriers is a wall of trees.

==== Bergwerk ("Mine") ====
Perhaps the most notorious corner on the long circuit, Bergwerk has been responsible for some serious and sometimes fatal accidents. A tight right-hand corner, coming just after a long, fast section and a left-hand kink on a small crest, was where Carel Godin de Beaufort fatally crashed. The fast kink was also the scene of Niki Lauda's infamous fiery accident during the 1976 German Grand Prix. This left kink is often referred to as the Lauda-Links (Lauda left). The Bergwerk, along with the Breidscheid/Adenauer Bridge corners before it, are one of the series of corners that make or break one's lap time around the Nürburgring because of the fast, lengthy uphill section called Kesselchen (Little Valley) that comes after the Bergwerk.

==== Caracciola Karussell ("Carousel") ====
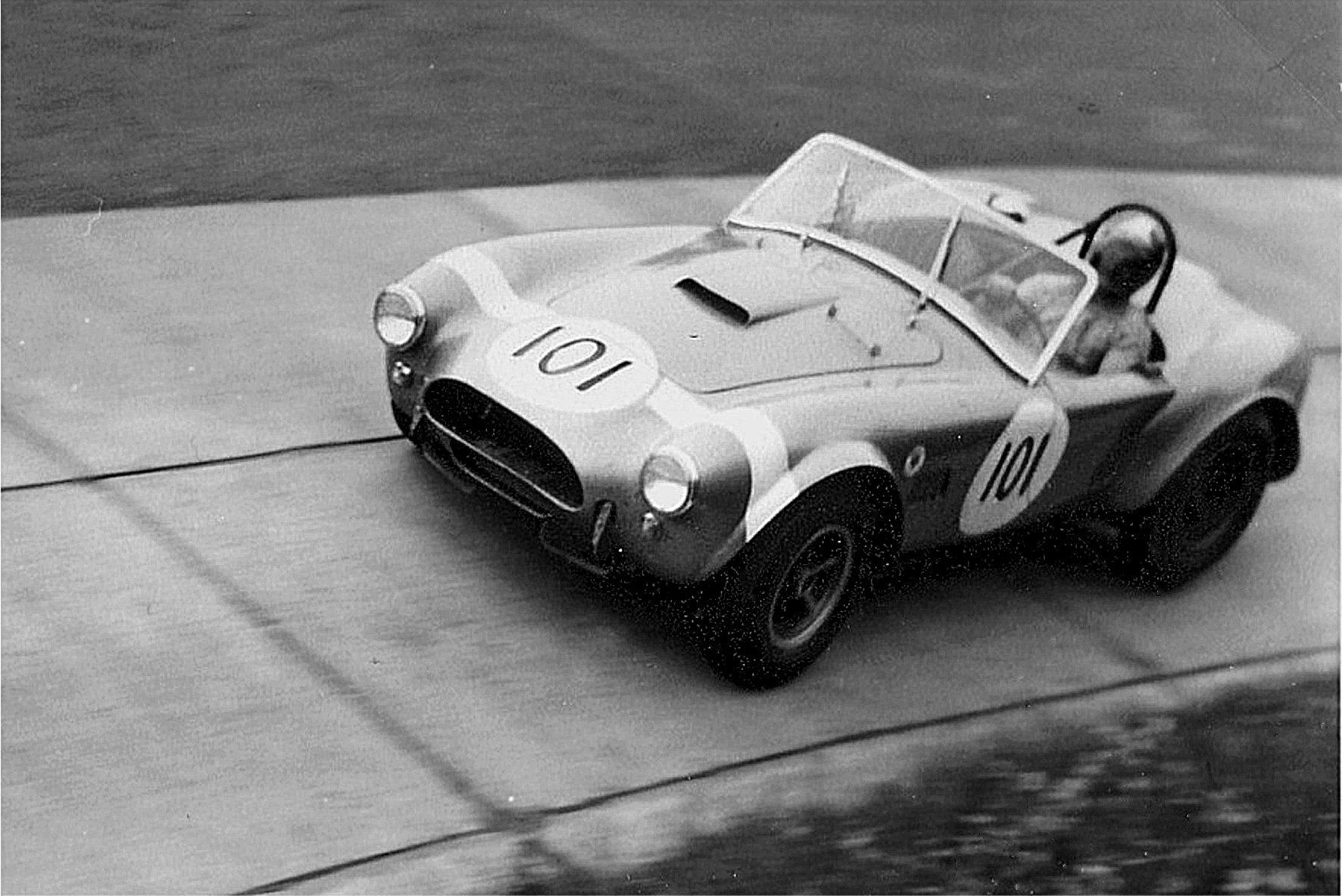
Shelby Cobra on the Karussell

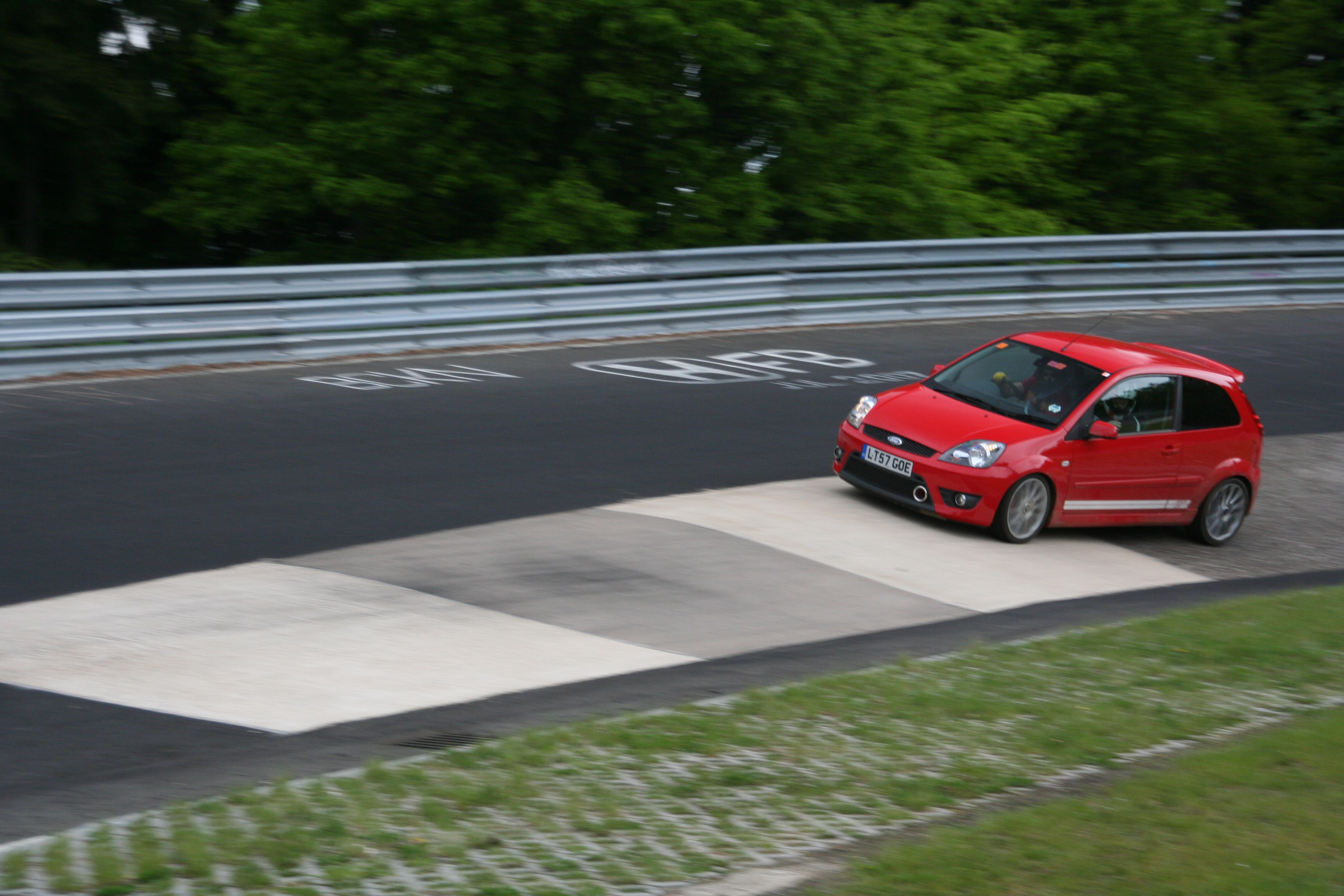
Ford Fiesta ST exiting Karussell

Although being one of the slower corners on the Nordschleife, the Karussell is perhaps its most famous and one of its most iconic- it is one of two berm-style, banked corners on the track. Soon after the driver has negotiated the long uphill section after Bergwerk and gone through a section called Klostertal (Monastery Valley), the driver turns right through a long hairpin, past an abandoned section called Steilstrecke (Steep Route) and then goes up another hill towards the Karrusell.

The entrance to the corner is blind, although Juan Manuel Fangio is reputed to have advised a young driver to "aim for the tallest tree," a feature that was also built into the rendering of the circuit in the Gran Turismo 4 and Grand Prix Legends video games. Once the driver has reached the top of the hill, the road then becomes sharply banked on one side and level on the other- this banking drops off, rather than climbing up like most bankings on circuits. The sharply banked side has a concrete surface, and there is a foot-wide tarmac surface on the bottom of the banking for cars to get extra grip through the very rough concrete banking.

Cars drop into the concrete banking, and keep the car in the corner (which is 210 degrees, much like a hairpin bend) until the road levels out and the concrete surface becomes tarmac again. This corner is very hard on the driver's wrists and hands because of the prolonged bumpy cornering the driver must do while in the Karrusell. Usually, cars come out of the top of the end of the banking to hit the apex that comes right after the end of the Karrusell.

The combination of a recognisable corner, slow-moving cars, and the variation in viewing angle as cars rotate around the banking, means that this is one of the circuit's most popular locations for photographers. It is named after German pre-WWII racing driver Rudolf Caracciola, who reportedly made the corner his own by hooking the inside tires into a drainage ditch to help his car "hug" the curve. As more concrete was uncovered and more competitors copied him, the trend took hold. At a later reconstruction, the corner was remade with real concrete banking, as it remains to this day.

Shortly after the Karussell is a steep section, with gradients in excess of 16%, leading to a right-hander called Hohe Acht, which is some 300 m (980 ft) higher in altitude than Breidscheid.

==== Brünnchen ("Small Well") ====
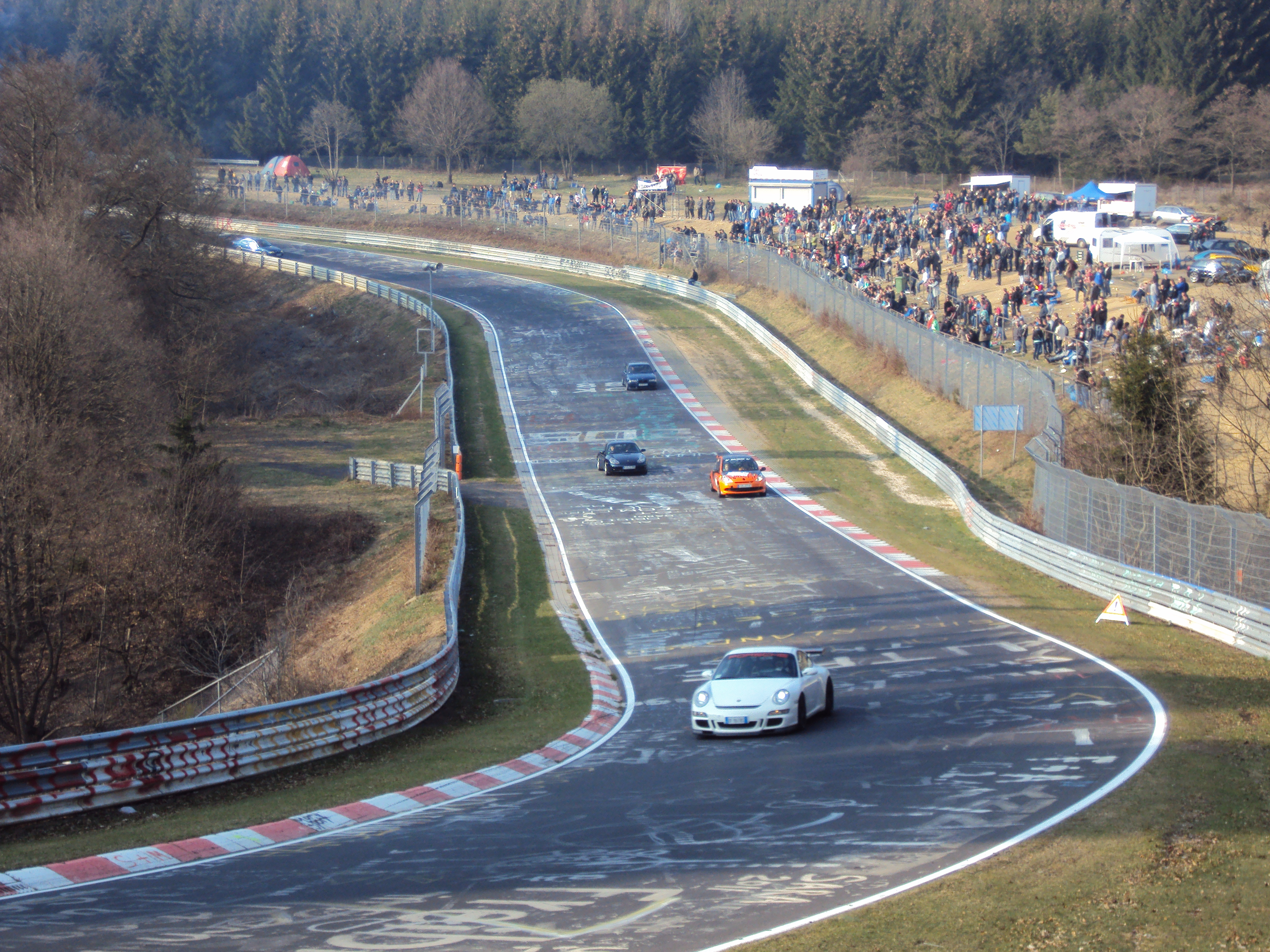
Brünnchen and spectator area

A popular spectator vantage point, the Brünnchen section is composed of two right-hand corners and a very short straight. The first corner goes sharply downhill and the next, after the very short downhill straight, goes uphill slightly. This is a section of the track where on public days, accidents commonly happen particularly at the blind uphill right-hand corner. Like almost every corner at the Nürburgring, both right-handers are blind.

The short straight used to have a steep and sudden drop-off that caused cars to take off and a bridge that went over a pathway; these were taken out and smoothed over when the circuit was rebuilt in 1970 and 1971. The uphill right-hand corner is often referred to as "Youtube corner", because of the large number of videos featuring a perspective of that corner.

==== Pflanzgarten ("Planting Garden") and Stefan Bellof S ("Stefan Bellof Esses") ====
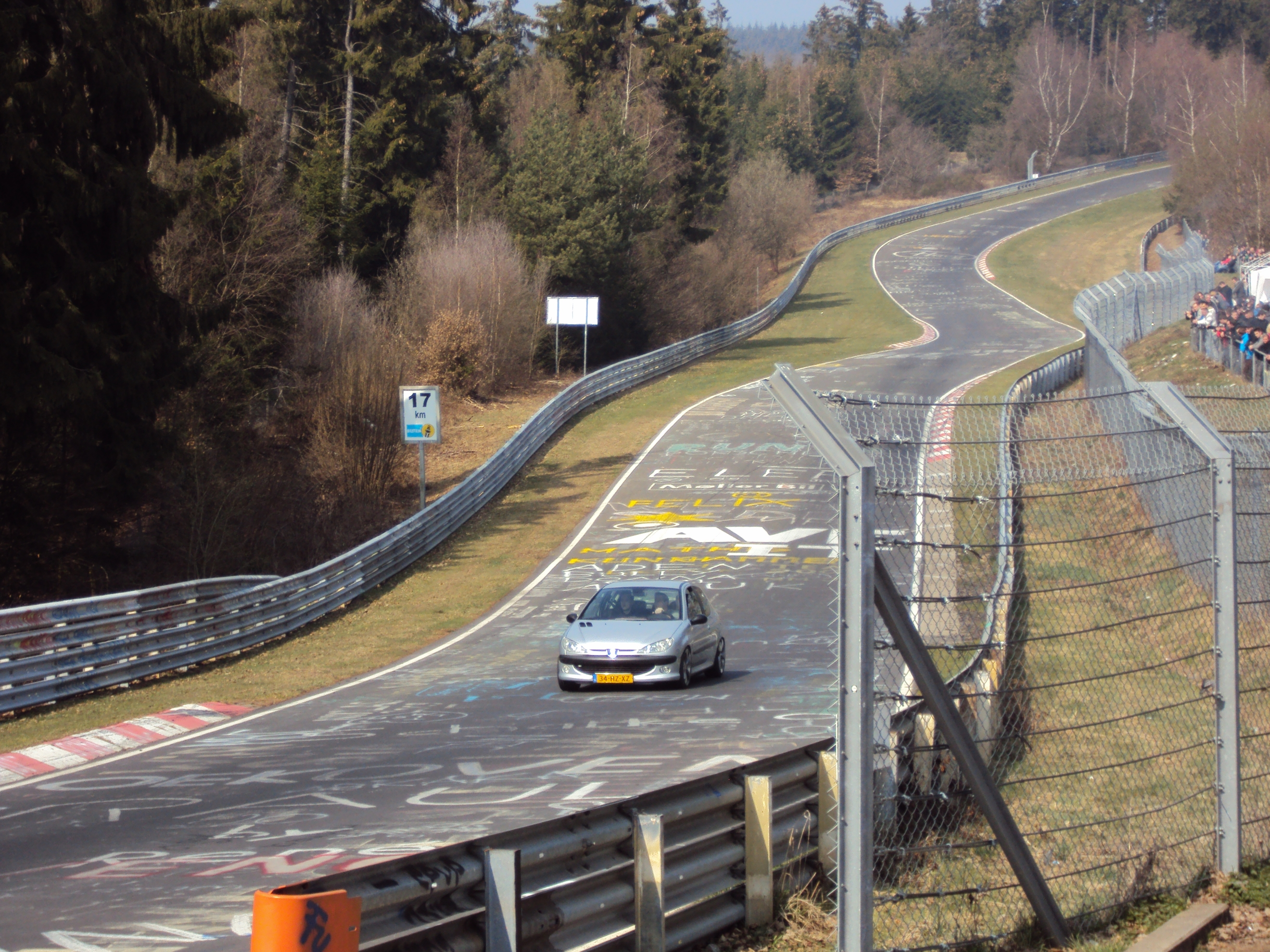
Pflanzgarten

The Pflanzgarten, which is soon after the Brünnchen, is one of the fastest, trickiest and most difficult sections of the Nürburgring. It is full of jumps, including two huge ones, one of which is called Sprunghügel (Jump Hill). This section is unique in that it is made up of two different sections; getting the entire Pflanzgarten right is crucial to a good lap time around the Nürburgring. This section was the scene of Briton Peter Collins's fatal accident during the 1958 German Grand Prix, and the scene of a number of career-ending accidents in Formula One in the 1970s —Britons Mike Hailwood and Ian Ashley were two victims of the Pflanzgarten.

Pflanzgarten 1 is made up of a slightly banked, downhill left-hander which then suddenly switches back left, then right. Then immediately, giving the driver nearly no time to react (knowledge of this section is key) the road drops away twice: the first jump is only slight, then right after (somewhat like a staircase) the road drops away very sharply which usually causes almost all cars to go airborne at this jump; the drop is so sudden. Then, immediately after the road levels out very shortly after the jump and the car touches the ground again, the road immediately and suddenly goes right very quickly and then right again; this is what makes up the end of the first Pflanzgarten- a very fast multiple apex sequence of right-hand corners.

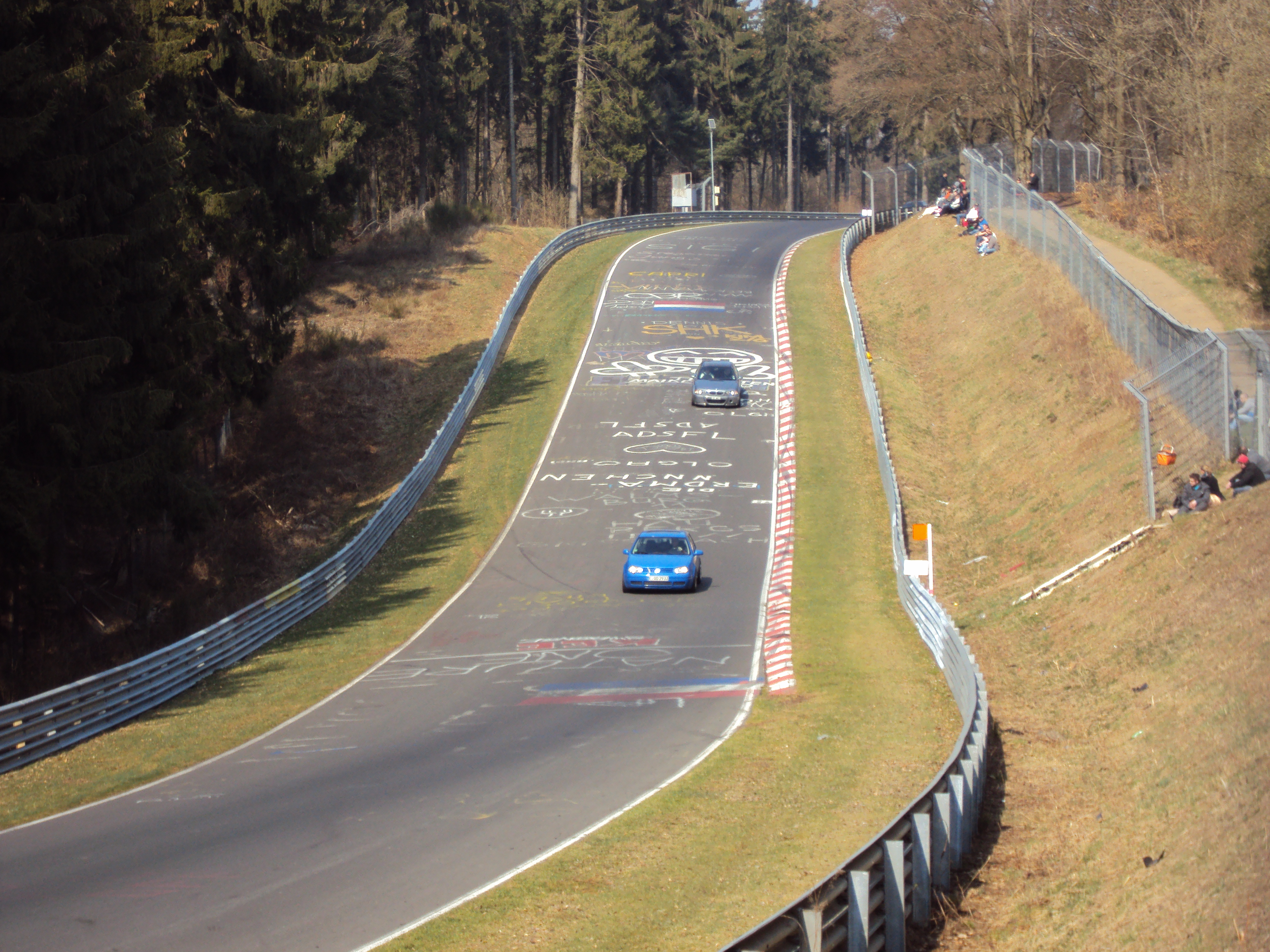
Sprunghügel

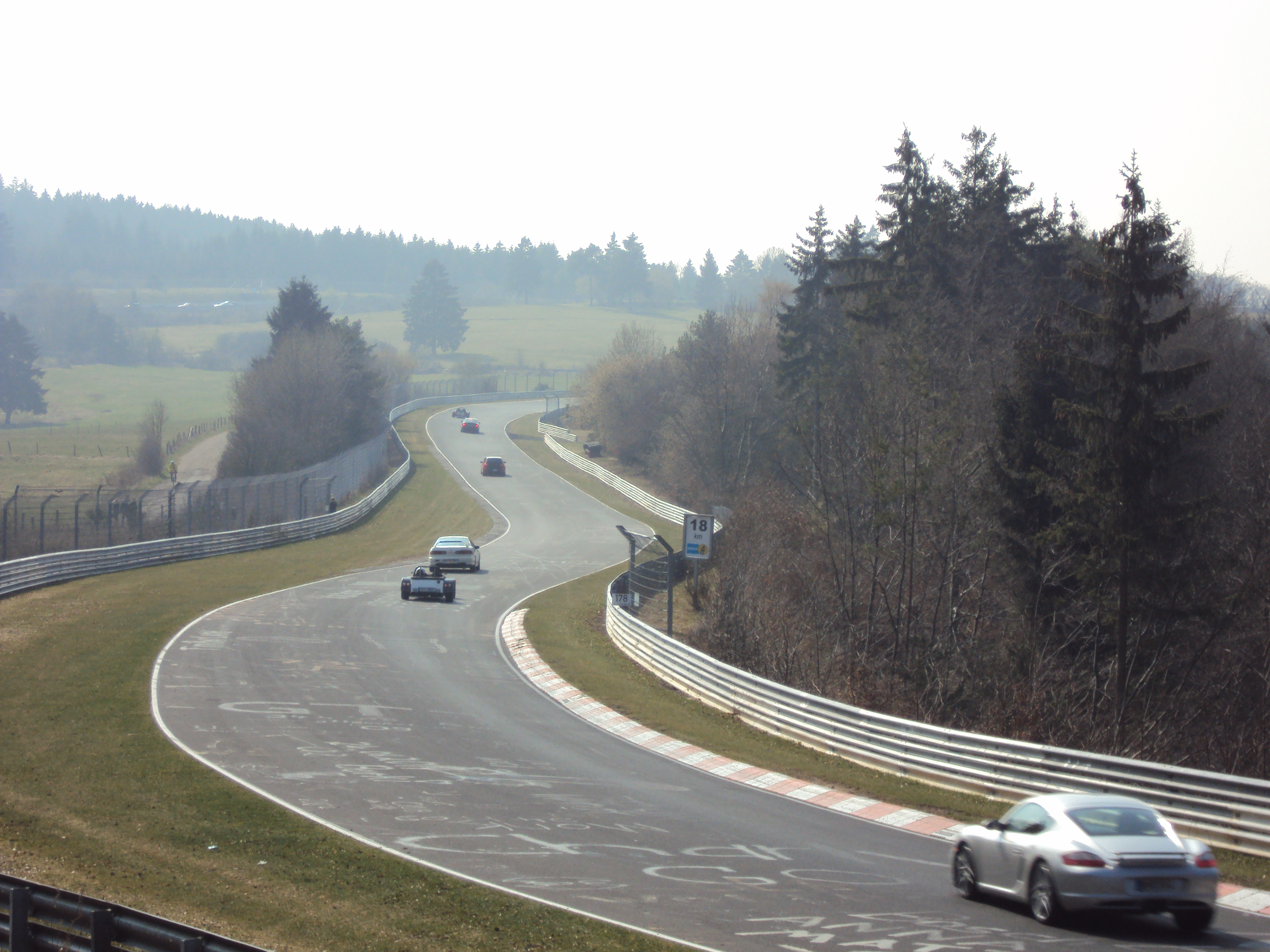
Stefan Bellof S

The road then goes slightly uphill and then through another jump; the road suddenly drops away and levels out and at the same time, the road turns through a flat-out left-hander. Then, the road drops away again very suddenly, which is the second huge jump of the Pflanzgarten known as the Sprunghügel. The road then goes downhill then quickly levels out, then it goes through a flat-out right-hander and this starts the Stefan Bellof S (named as such because Bellof crashed a Porsche 956 there during the 1983 Nurburgring 1000 km), which was known as Pflanzgarten 2 prior to 2013.

The Stefan Bellof S is considered a technically demanding section due to its rapid left-right combination. The quick succession of turns offers few fixed reference points, making orientation and finding the racing line difficult. Following a jump crest at the end of the switchbacks, a high-speed right-hander is taken at full throttle. A short subsequent straight leads directly into the Schwalbenschwanz (Swallow's Tail) section, which consists of two very fast turns.

The room for error on every part of the consistently high-speed Pflanzgarten and the Stefan Bellof S is virtually non-existent (much like the entire track itself). The road and the surface of the Pflanzgarten and the Stefan Bellof S moves around unpredictably; knowledge of this section is key to getting through cleanly.

==== Schwalbenschwanz/Kleines Karussell ("Swallow's Tail"/"Little Carousel") ====
The Schwalbenschwanz is a sequence of very fast sweepers located after the Stefan Bellof S. After a short straight, there is a very fast right-hand sweeper that progressively goes uphill, and this leads into a blind left-hander that is a bit slower. The apex is completely blind, and the corner then changes gradient a bit; it goes up then down, which leads into a short straight that ends at the Kleines Karussell. Originally, this part had a bridge that went over a stream and was very bumpy; this bridge was taken out and replaced with a culvert (large industrial pipe) so that the road could be smoothed over.

The Kleines Karussell is similar to its bigger brother, except that it is a 90-degree corner instead of 210 degrees, and is faster and slightly less banked. Once this part of the track is dealt with, the drivers are near the end of the lap; with two more corners Galgenkopf to negotiate before the 2.135 km (1.327 mi) long Döttinger Höhe straight.

=== Südschleife layout ===
Nürburgring Südschleife
- The Nürburgring Südschleife
- Location: Nürburg, Germany
- Opened: 1927
- Closed: 1982
- Website: https://nuerburgring.de

The Nürburgring Südschleife (south loop) was a motor racing circuit which was built in 1927 at the same time as the Nordschleife.

The Südschleife and Nordschleife layouts were joined together by the Start und Ziel (start/finish) area, and could therefore be driven as one track that was over 28.265 km (17.563 mi) long. Races were held at the combined layout only until 1931. The Südschleife was used for the ADAC Eifelrennen from 1928 until 1931 and from 1958 until 1968, as well as for the Eifelpokal and other minor races.

The Südschleife was rarely used after the Nordschleife was rebuilt and updated in 1970 and 1971, and was finally destroyed by the building of the current Nürburgring Grand Prix circuit in the early 1980s. Today only small sections of the original track remain.

==== Track description ====
The shared start/finish area of the Nürburgring complex consisted of two back-to-back straights joined together at the southern end by a tight loop. The entrance to the 7.747 km (4.814 mi) Südschleife lay on the outside edge of this hairpin and was signposted as the road to Bonn. It immediately dropped sharply downhill and under a public road before winding through a heavily-wooded section.

Tight corners soon gave way to fast downhill sections with flowing bends until, at the outskirts of the nearby town of Müllenbach, the track turned sharply right northwards and began a long climb up the hill.

At the end of this run came a right hairpin turn which led to a long left curve around the bottom of a hill. This led onto the back straight of the start/finish area. At this point it was possible to continue onto the Nordschleife or take two sharp right-hand turns in order to enter the starting straight once again.

Photographs of the track in use show that trees and hedges were not cut back in many areas, being allowed to grow right up to the trackside. Although the Nordschleife had very little in the way of run-off areas, the Südschleife seems to have had none at all, which was likely to have been a factor in the choice of circuit for major events.

==== Sections of routes ====
km	Section
0	Start and finish
	Connection south sweep
1	
	Bränkekopf
2	Aschenschlag
	Seifgen
3	
	Bocksberg
4	Müllenbach
	Rassrück
5	
	Scharfer Kopf
6	
	Gegengerade
7	
	Nordkehre
7,747	Start and finish

The route sections bore the following names, among others Bränkekopf, Aschenschlag, Seifgen, Bocksberg, Müllenbach and Scharfer Kopf.

==== Stichstraße shortcut ====
In 1938 a small section of new track (the Stichstraße) was laid which allowed drivers nearing the end of the Südschleife to bypass the start/finish straights and take a right turn which led back to the start of the downhill twists. This shortened a lap to around 5.7 km (3.5 mi). This layout was used for tourist rides and for testing.

==== Remaining sections ====
The current Grand Prix circuit required the complete destruction of the start/finish area but at a point around 1 km (0.62 mi) into the Südschleife, a modern public road now follows the route, although the bends have been eased and the vegetation does not come as close to the road as it did when the track was open.

This public road continues into the town of Müllenbach but leaves the route of the old track on the outskirts. Nothing remains of the famous corners there.

The road up the hill still exists and is sometimes used to allow access to parking areas for the Grand Prix track. The lower sections are no longer maintained.

Surviving sections, and the parking lots, are still used in competition. The Cologne-Ahrweiler Rally often uses the Südschleife in competition.

=== Layout history ===
==== Current circuit configurations ====
Grand Prix Strecke (2002–present)

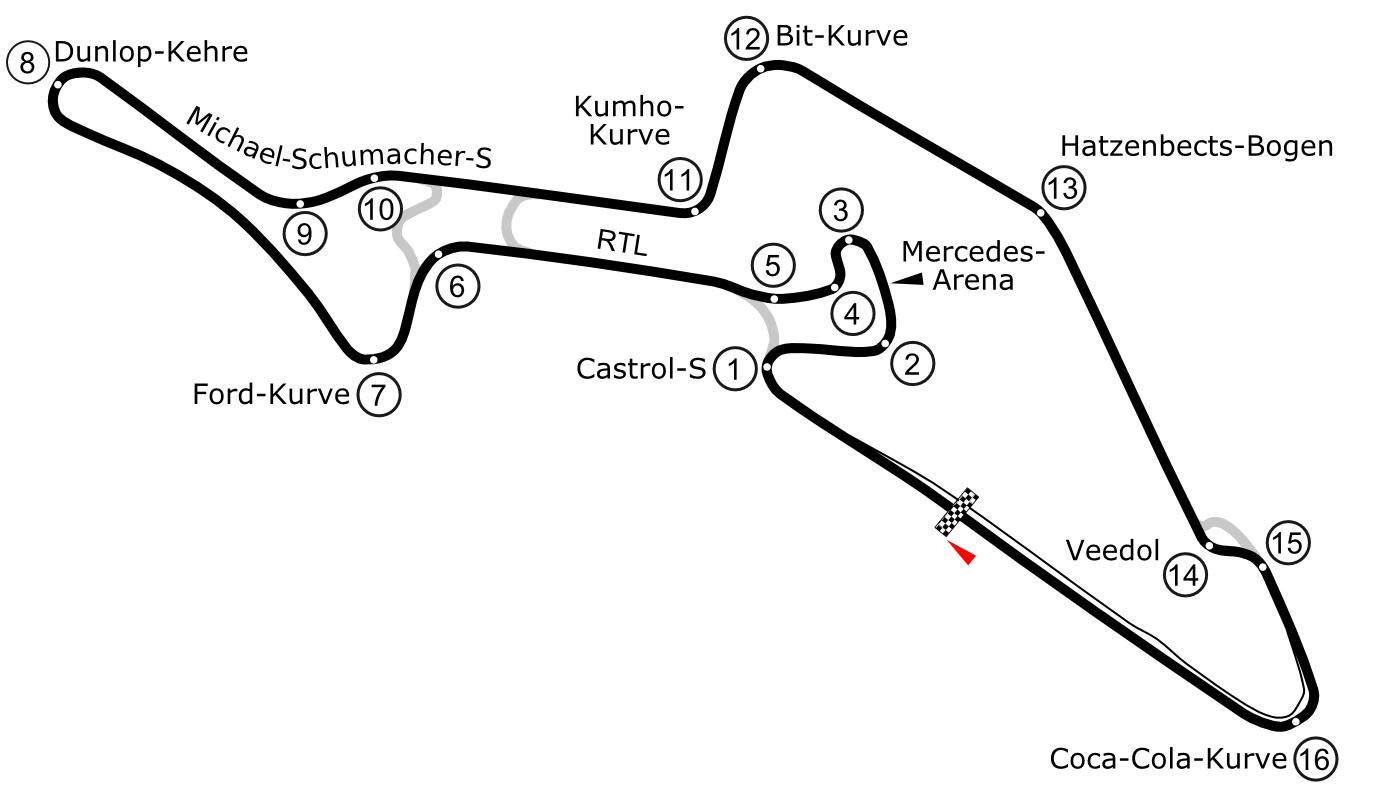
Grand Prix Strecke without F1 Chicane (2002–present)

Sprint Circuit (2002–present)

Müllenbach Circuit (2002–present)

Combined Grand Prix Strecke with Mercedes-Arena (2002–present)

24 Hours Circuit (Combined Grand Prix Strecke without Mercedes-Arena) (2002–present)

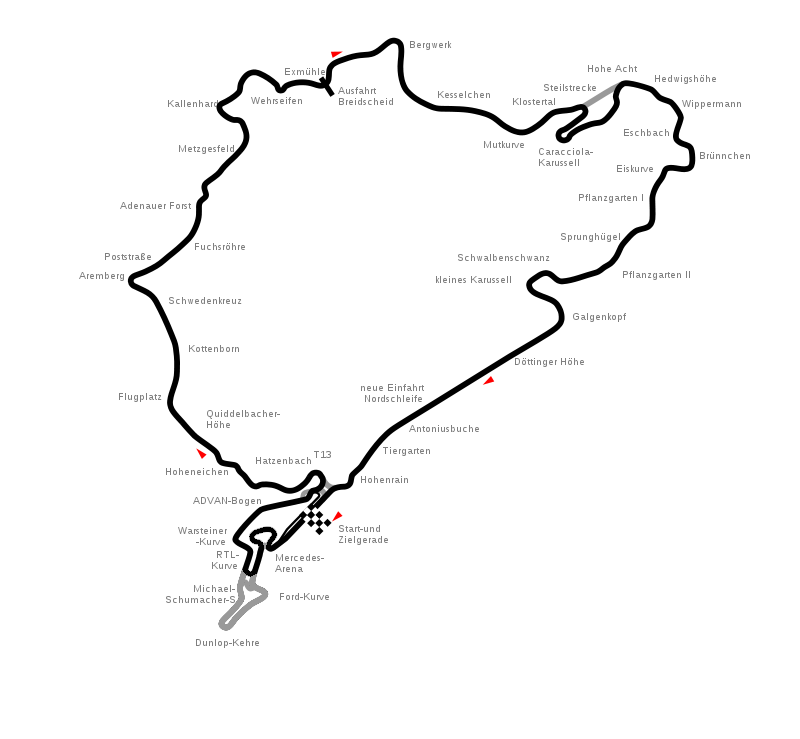
Combined Sprint Circuit with Mercedes-Arena (2002–present)

Nordschleife (1983–present)

World RX circuit (2020–present)

==== Previous configurations ====
Nordschleife (1927–1966)

Gesamtstrecke (1927–1966)

Südschleife (1927–1973)

Nordschleife (1967–1982)

Gesamtstrecke (1967–1973)

Südschleife (1973–1982)

Betonschleife/Zielschleife (1927–1982)
Grand Prix Circuit (1984–1994)

Comparison between Nordschleife and Grand Prix Circuit (1984–1994)

Grand Prix Strecke with F1 Chicane (1995–2001)

Comparison between Nordschleife and Grand Prix Strecke (1995–2001)

Karting Circuit (1995–2001)

24 Hours Circuit (1984–2001)

Rallycross Circuit (1991–1997)

== Lap records ==
=== Nürburgring Nordschleife ===
As of May 2023, the fastest official race lap records at the Nürburgring Nordschleife are listed as:

Category	Time	Driver	Vehicle	Event
Short Combined Circuit (2002–present): 24.369 km (15.142 mi)
GT3	8:03.113	Frank Stippler	Audi R8 LMS ultra	2013 44. Adenauer ADAC Simfy Trophy
GT2	8:13.408	Uwe Alzen	Porsche 911 (997) Turbo	2008 Nürburgring VLN race
Short Combined Circuit (2002–present): 24.358 km (15.135 mi)
GT3	7:49.578	Christian Krognes	BMW M4 GT3	2022 NIMEX DMV 4-Stunden-Rennen
DTM	8:26.742	Manuel Reuter	Opel Astra DTM	2004 24 Hours Nürburgring
Short Combined Circuit (2002–present): 24.433 km (15.182 mi)
GT2	8:09.949	Uwe Alzen	Porsche 911 (996) Turbo	2005 Nürburgring VLN race
Full 24 Hours Circuit – Combined GP Circuit (with Mercedes-Benz Arena) (2002–present): 25.947 km (16.123 mi)
GT1 (GTS)	9:02.206	Peter Zakowski	Dodge Viper GTS-R	2003 24 Hours of Nürburgring
GT	9:08.008	Lucas Luhr	Porsche 911 (996) GT2	2003 Nürburgring VLN race
24 Hours Circuit – Combined GP Circuit (without Mercedes-Benz Arena) (2002–present): 25.378 km (15.769 mi)
GT3	8:08.006	Daniel Keilwitz	Ferrari 296 GT3	2023 24 Hours of Nürburgring
GT2	8:36.768	Marcel Tiemann	Porsche 911 (997) GT3-RSR	2009 24 Hours of Nürburgring
TC1	8:37.384	Yvan Muller	Citroën C-Elysée WTCC	2015 FIA WTCC Race of Germany
TCR Touring Car	8:53.608	Jean-Karl Vernay	Hyundai Elantra N TCR	2021 FIA WTCR Race of Germany
Super 2000	9:19.256	Petr Fulín	SEAT León Cup Racer	2016 Nürburgring ETC round
Porsche Carrera Cup	10:00.222	René Rast	Porsche 911 (997 II) GT3 Cup	2011 1st Nürburgring Porsche Supercup round
Super 1600	10:35.657	Niklas Mackschin	Ford Fiesta 1.6 16V	2016 Nürburgring ETC round
Short Combined Circuit (1984–2001): 23.849 km (14.819 mi)
Class 1 Touring Cars	8:19.910	Volker Strycek	Opel Calibra V6 4x4	2000 Nürburgring VLN race
Combined Circuit (1984–2001): 25.359 km (15.757 mi)
Group A	8:46.930	Johnny Cecotto	BMW M3 (E30) Sport Evo	1992 2nd Nürburgring DTM round
Class 1 Touring Cars	8:47.710	Nicola Larini	Alfa Romeo 155 V6 TI	1993 1st Nürburgring DTM round
GT1 (GTS)	8:58.014	Peter Zakowski	Dodge Viper GTS-R	2000 Nürburgring 24 Hours
GT	8:58.703	Christian Menzel	Porsche 911 (996) GT3-RS	2001 Nürburgring 24 Hours
Nordschleife (1983–present): 20.832 km (12.944 mi)
Group C	6:25.910	Stefan Bellof	Porsche 956	1983 1000 km of Nürburgring
Formula Two	6:28.030	Christian Danner	March 832	1983 Eifelrennen
Formula Three	7:19.670	Franz Konrad	Anson SA4	1983 Bitburger ADAC 1000 km Rennen F3 round
GT1 (GTS)	7:20.098	Peter Zakowski	Dodge Viper GTS-R	2002 VLN 27. DMV-4-Stunden
Group B	7:24.290	Harald Grohs	BMW M1	1983 1000 km of Nürburgring
Group A	8:02.440	Tom Walkinshaw	Jaguar XJS	1983 Nürburgring ETCC round
Nordschleife (1970–1982): 22.835 km (14.189 mi)
Formula One	7:06.400	Clay Regazzoni	Ferrari 312T	1975 German Grand Prix
Formula Two	7:06.510	Stefan Bellof	Maurer MM82	1982 Eifelrennen
Group 5 Sports Prototype	7:15.900	Jean-Pierre Jarier	Matra MS670C	1974 1000 km of Nürburgring
Group 5 Special Production	7:22.420	Manfred Winkelhock	Ford Capri III Turbo	1981 Nürburgring Nordschleife DRM round
Group C	7:23.870	Manfred Winkelhock	Ford C100	1982 1000 km of Nürburgring
Group 7	7:32.800	Willi Kauhsen	Porsche 917/10 Turbo	1973 7. Internationales ADAC Nürburgring 300 km Rennen
Group 6	7:33.530	Jochen Mass	Porsche 908/80	1981 1000 km of Nürburgring
Group 4	7:45.470	Hans-Joachim Stuck	BMW M1	1982 Nürburgring Nordschleife DRM round
Group 2	8:10.900	Hans-Joachim Stuck	BMW 3.0 CSL	1974 6 Hours of Nürburgring
500cc	8:22.230	Marco Lucchinelli	Suzuki RG 500	1980 German motorcycle Grand Prix
350cc	8:39.700	Takazumi Katayama	Yamaha TZ 350	1978 German motorcycle Grand Prix
250cc	8:49.500	Kork Ballington	Kawasaki KR250	1978 German motorcycle Grand Prix
Group A	9:02.360	Tom Walkinshaw	Jaguar XJS	1982 6 Hours of Nürburgring
125cc	9:17.000	Ángel Nieto	Minarelli 125	1978 German motorcycle Grand Prix
50cc	10:15.800	Ricardo Tormo	Bultaco TSS 50	1978 German motorcycle Grand Prix
Nordschleife (1967–1970): 22.835 km (14.189 mi)
Formula One	7:43.800	Jacky Ickx	Brabham BT26A	1969 German Grand Prix
Group 6	7:50.400	Pedro Rodríguez	Porsche 908/03	1970 1000 km of Nürburgring
Formula Two	8:05.300	Jackie Stewart	Matra MS7	1969 Eifelrennen
Group 2	9:28.000	Andrea de Adamich	Alfa Romeo 2000 GTAm	1970 Nürburgring 6 Hours
500cc	10:41.900	Giacomo Agostini	MV Agusta 500 Three	1970 German motorcycle Grand Prix
350cc	11:03.900	Giacomo Agostini	MV Agusta 350 3C	1970 German motorcycle Grand Prix
250cc	11:24.700	Klaus Huber	Yamaha 250 V4	1970 German motorcycle Grand Prix
125cc	12:16.900	László Szabó	MZ RE 125	1970 German motorcycle Grand Prix
50cc	12:53.300	Ángel Nieto	Derbi 50	1970 German motorcycle Grand Prix
Nordschleife (1927–1966): 22.800 km (14.167 mi)
Formula One	8:24.100	Jim Clark	Lotus 33	1965 German Grand Prix
Sports car racing	8:37.000	John Surtees	Ferrari 330 P4	1966 1000 km of Nürburgring Lamborghini Huracán GT3 EVO2 at Nürburgring
Group 3	9:09.000	John Surtees	Ferrari 275 P	1964 1000 km of Nürburgring
Formula Two	9:29.400	Jean-Pierre Beltoise	Matra MS5	1966 German Grand Prix
GP	9:52.200	Hermann Lang	Mercedes-Benz W154	1939 Eifelrennen
500cc	10:23.300	Geoff Duke	Gilera Saturno	1955 German motorcycle Grand Prix
350cc	10:35.000	Bill Lomas	Moto Guzzi Bialbero	1955 German motorcycle Grand Prix
Group 2	10:44.000	Ragnar Eklund	Austin Mini Cooper S	1966 500 km of Nürburgring
250cc	10:56.700	Hermann Paul Müller	NSU Rennmax G.P. 250cc	1955 German motorcycle Grand Prix
125cc	11:06.600	Carlo Ubbiali	MV Agusta 125 Bialbero	1958 German motorcycle Grand Prix
Gesamtstrecke (1927–1982): 28.265 km (17.563 mi)
Grand Prix	15:06.100	Louis Chiron	Bugatti Type 35C	1929 German Grand Prix

=== Nürburgring Südschleife ===
The fastest official race lap records on the Südschleife are listed as:

Category	Time	Driver	Vehicle	Event
Südschleife (1927–1982): 7.747 km (4.814 mi)
Group 7	2:38.600	Helmut Kelleners	March 707	1970 Internationales AvD - SCM-Rundstrecken-Rennen Aachen Nürburgring
Group 5	2:43.200	Jürgen Neuhaus	Porsche 917 Spyder	1971 6th International 300 km race
Formula Two	2:47.000	Brian Redman	Lola T100	1968 Eifelrennen
Group 4	3:01.800	Paul Hawkins	Ford GT40	1968 Internationales ADAC-Eifelpokal-Rennen Nürburgring
350cc	3:06.700	Giacomo Agostini	MV Agusta 350 3C	1968 German motorcycle Grand Prix
500cc	3:08.600	Giacomo Agostini	MV Agusta 500 Three	1968 German motorcycle Grand Prix
Formula Junior	3:12.200	Kurt Ahrens Jr.	Lotus 22	1962 ADAC-Eifelpokal-Rennen
250cc	3:13.400	Bill Ivy	Yamaha 250 V4	1968 German motorcycle Grand Prix
125cc	3:22.000	Bill Ivy	Yamaha 125 V4	1968 German motorcycle Grand Prix
Group 3	3:28.100	Jürgen Neuhaus	Porsche 911 S	1967 ADAC-Hansa-Pokal-Rennen Nürburgring
50cc	3:49.500	Hans-Georg Anscheidt	Suzuki 50 GP	1968 German motorcycle Grand Prix

=== Modern Nürburgring ===
As of September 2026, the fastest official lap records at the modern Nürburgring circuit layouts are listed as:

Category	Time	Driver	Vehicle	Event
GP-Strecke (with Mercedes-Benz Arena and F1 Chicane) (2002–present): 5.148 km (3.199 mi)
Formula One	1:28.139	Max Verstappen	Red Bull Racing RB16	2020 Eifel Grand Prix
LMP1	1:40.325	Marcel Fässler	Audi R18	2016 6 Hours of Nürburgring
GP2	1:41.119	Edoardo Mortara	Dallara GP2/08	2009 Nürburgring GP2 Series round
Formula Renault 3.5	1:43.306	Tom Dillmann	Dallara T12	2015 Nürburgring Formula Renault 3.5 Series round
Superleague Formula	1:43.463	Antônio Pizzonia	Panoz DP09	2008 Nürburgring Superleague Formula round
GP3	1:46.712	Facu Regalia	Dallara GP3/13	2013 Nürburgring GP3 Series round
LMP2	1:47.794	Nicolas Lapierre	Alpine A470	2017 6 Hours of Nürburgring
F3000	1:48.597	Tomáš Enge	Lola B02/50	2002 Nürburgring F3000 round
F2 (2009–2012)	1:48.844	Christopher Zanella	Williams JPH1B	2012 Nürburgring FTwo round
Class 1 Touring Cars	1:49.975	Nico Müller	Audi RS5 Turbo DTM 2020	2020 1st Nürburgring DTM round
LMPC	1:52.560	Dominik Kraihamer	Oreca FLM09	2009 Nürburgring Formula Le Mans Cup round
Renault Sport Trophy	1:54.540	Dario Capitanio	Renault Sport R.S. 01	2015 Nürburgring Renault Sport Trophy round
Formula Regional	1:55.109	Victor Martins	Tatuus FR-19	2020 Nürburgring Formula Renault Eurocup round
GT3	1:55.832	Mirko Bortolotti	Lamborghini Huracán GT3 Evo	2021 3 Hours of Nürburgring
LM GTE	1:55.962	Kévin Estre	Porsche 911 RSR (2017)	2017 6 Hours of Nürburgring
Formula Renault 2.0	1:56.221	Max Defourny	Tatuus FR2.0/13	2017 Nürburgring Formula Renault Eurocup round
GT1 (GTS)	1:58.370	Alessandro Pier Guidi	Maserati MC12 GT1	2010 Nürburgring FIA GT1 round
Ferrari Challenge	1:58.397	Giacomo Altoè	Ferrari 296 Challenge	2024 Nürburgring Ferrari Challenge Europe round
Formula Volkswagen	1:59.574	Sven Barth	Reynard Formula Volkswagen	2002 1st Nürburgring Formula Volkswagen Germany round
Lamborghini Super Trofeo	1:59.582	Frederik Schandorff	Lamborghini Huracán Super Trofeo Evo2	2023 Nürburgring Lamborghini Super Trofeo Europe round
Formula 4	2:00.406	Jonas Ried	Tatuus F4-T421	2022 2nd Nürburgring ADAC Formula 4 round
Porsche Carrera Cup	2:02.320	Larry ten Voorde	Porsche 911 (991 II) GT3 Cup	2017 1st Nürburgring Porsche Carrera Cup Germany round
Formula BMW	2:04.689	Nico Hülkenberg	Mygale FB02	2005 1st Nürburgring Formula BMW ADAC Round
Eurocup Mégane Trophy	2:04.881	Fabien Thuner	Renault Mégane Renault Sport II	2012 Nürburgring Eurocup Mégane Trophy round
ADAC Formel Masters	2:05.246	Richie Stanaway	Dallara Formulino	2010 Nürburgring ADAC Formel Masters round
V8Star Series	2:05.497	Robert Lechner	V8Star car	2002 1st Nürburgring V8Star round
TCR Touring Car	2:07.962	Mikel Azcona	Cupra León Competición TCR	2021 Nürburgring TCR Europe round
SEAT León Supercopa	2:08.622	Mikel Azcona	SEAT León Cup Racer	2016 Nürburgring SEAT León Eurocup round
Formula Renault 1.6	2:09.487	Janneau Esmeijer	Signatech FR 1.6	2014 Nürburgring Formula Renault 1.6 NEC round
Renault Clio Cup	2.19.138	Oscar Nogués	Renault Clio III RS (197)	2014 Nürburgring Eurocup Clio round
GP-Strecke without F1 Chicane (using Mercedes-Benz Arena) (2002–present): 5.137 km (3.192 mi)
LMP1	1:37.955	Neel Jani	Porsche 919 Hybrid	2015 6 Hours of Nürburgring
LMP2	1:45.697	Jeroen Bleekemolen	Porsche RS Spyder	2008 1000 km of Nürburgring
LMP3	1:51.206	Danny Soufi	Ligier JS P325	2026 Nürburgring Prototype Cup Europe round
GT3	1:54.284	Mikaël Grenier	Mercedes-AMG GT3 Evo	2026 Nürburgring 24H Series round
World SBK	1:54.594	Tom Sykes	Kawasaki Ninja ZX-10R	2013 Nürburgring World SBK round
GT1 (GTS)	1:54.850	Antonio García	Aston Martin DBR9	2008 1000 km of Nürburgring
LM GTE	1:55.191	Gianmaria Bruni	Ferrari 458 Italia GT2	2015 6 Hours of Nürburgring
Porsche Carrera Cup	1:57.408	Rik Breukers	Porsche 911 (992 I) GT3 Cup	2026 Nürburgring 24H Series round
World SSP	1:58.072	Kenan Sofuoğlu	Kawasaki Ninja ZX-6R	2013 Nürburgring World SSP round
Formula Palmer Audi	1:58.210	Jonathan Kennard	Formula Palmer Audi car	2004 Nürburgring Formula Palmer Audi round
SRO GT2	1:59.302	Kevin Madsen	Ligier JS2 RS	2026 Nürburgring 24H Series round
Group 6 prototype	1:59.532	Felix Haas	Lola T294	2020 Nürburgring Oldtimer Grand Prix (FHR100)
Radical Cup	1:59.610	Marcus Littlewood	Radical SR3 XXR	2026 Mugello Radical Cup Europe round
Lamborghini Super Trofeo	2:00.467	Frederik Schandorff	Lamborghini Huracán Super Trofeo Evo2	2023 Nürburgring Lamborghini Super Trofeo Europe round
ADAC Formel Masters	2:01.584	Gustav Malja	Dallara Formulino	2012 2nd Nürburgring ADAC Formel Masters round
GT	2:02.353	Sascha Maassen	Porsche 911 (996) GT3-RSR	2004 1000 km of Nürburgring
GT4	2:04.835	Elia Weiss	BMW M4 GT4 Evo	2026 Nürburgring 24H Series round
Super Touring	2:11.040	Gerhard Füller	Opel Vectra STW	2020 Nürburgring Oldtimer Grand Prix (Tourenwagen Classics)
Group 2	2:26.798	Meinrenken Timm	Alfa Romeo 1750 GTAm	2020 Nürburgring Oldtimer Grand Prix (AvD-Tourenwagen- und GT-Trophäe)
GP-Strecke without Mercedes-Benz Arena (using F1 Chicane) (2002–present): 4.638 km (2.882 mi)
FA1	1:33.834	Alessio Picariello	Lola B05/52	2014 Nürburgring FA1 round
Pickup truck racing	1:58.320	Jack van der Ende	MWV6 Pick Up	2014 Nürburgring MW-V6 Pickup Series round
Oldtimer Circuit (GP-Strecke without Mercedes-Benz arena using old chicane) (2002–present): 4.569 km (2.839 mi)
Formula One	1:36.325	Martin Stretton	Tyrrell 012	2018 Nürburgring Oldtimer Grand Prix
LMP1	1:36.771	Mike Cantillon	Pescarolo 01	2019 Nürburgring Oldtimer Grand Prix (Aston Martin Masters Endurance Legends)
LMP675	1:39.928	Mike Newton	MG-Lola EX257	2019 Nürburgring Oldtimer Grand Prix (Aston Martin Masters Endurance Legends)
Group 6 prototype	1:42.599	Felix Haas	Lola T294	2019 Nürburgring Oldtimer Grand Prix (FHR100)
Group 7	1:43.399	Marco Werner	McLaren M8F	2019 Nürburgring Oldtimer Grand Prix (FHR100)
Group 5	1:43.502	Peter Mücke	Zakspeed Ford Capri Turbo	2019 Nürburgring Oldtimer Grand Prix (Tourenwagen Classic)
GT3	1:43.651	Nick Tandy	Porsche 911 (997) GT3-R	2012 Nürburgring British GT round
Formula 4	1:43.796	Joshua Dürksen	Tatuus F4-T014	2020 2nd Nürburgring ADAC Formula 4 round
GT2	1:45.297	Yannik Trautwein	Ferrari 458 Italia GT2	2019 Nürburgring Oldtimer Grand Prix (FCD RacingSeries)
Group 4 sports car	1:48.333	Simon Hadfield	Lola T70 MkIIIB	2019 Nürburgring Oldtimer Grand Prix (FIA Masters Historic Sports Car Championship)
Class 1 Touring Cars	1:48.653	Rupp Stephan	Alfa Romeo 155 V6 TI ITC	2018 Nürburgring Oldtimer Grand Prix
ADAC Formel Masters	1:48.887	Kevin Magnussen	Dallara Formulino	2008 1st Nürburgring ADAC Formel Masters round
Group 6	1:49.366	Michael Gans	Lola T290	2018 Nürburgring Oldtimer Grand Prix
Historic Formula 3	1:49.937	Robert Moores	Chevron B38	2018 Nürburgring Oldtimer Grand Prix
GT4	1:52.118	Warren Hughes	Ginetta G50	2012 Nürburgring British GT round
Group A	1:52.996	Richard Weber	BMW M3 (E30) DTM	2017 Nürburgring Classic
Historic GP (up to 1965)	1:57.962	Peter Horsman	Lotus 18/21	2019 Nürburgring Oldtimer Grand Prix (Historic Grand Prix Cars bis 1965)
Formula Junior	2:01.896	Bradley Richard	Brabham BT2	2019 Nürburgring Oldtimer Grand Prix (FIA Lurani Trophy)
Historic two-seater sports car (1960–1961)	2:03.233	Nuthall William	Elva Mk VII S	2019 Nürburgring Oldtimer Grand Prix
Group 3 GT	2:04.563	Marcus von Oeynhausen	Jaguar E-Type	2016 Nürburgring Oldtimer Grand Prix
Sprint-Strecke (with Mercedes-Benz Arena + F1 chicane) (2002–present): 3.629 km (2.255 mi)
Auto GP	1:19.322	Kimiya Sato	Lola B05/52	2014 Nürburgring Auto GP round
Formula Three	1:20.866	Felix Rosenqvist	Dallara F315	2015 Nürburgring Formula 3 round
Formula 3000	1:21.218	Nicky Pastorelli	Lola B99/50	2004 Nürburgring Euro F3000 round
Class 1 Touring Cars	1:21.358	René Rast	Audi RS5 Turbo DTM 2019	2019 Nürburgring DTM round
DTM	1:22.308	René Rast	Audi RS5 DTM	2017 Nürburgring DTM round
LMP3	1:25.025	David Schumacher	Ligier JS P320	2024 Nürburgring Prototype Cup Germany round
GT3	1:25.988	Finn Wiebelhaus	Ford Mustang GT3 Evo	2026 Nürburgring DTM round
Superbike	1:26.100	Illia Mykhalchyk	BMW S1000RR	2019 Nürburgring IDM Superbike round
Formula 4	1:26.753	Frederik Vesti	Tatuus F4-T014	2018 Nürburgring ADAC Formula 4 round
GT1 (GTS)	1:27.970	David Hart	Chrysler Viper GTS-R	2002 Nürburgring Belcar round
Porsche Carrera Cup	1:28.033	Robert de Haan	Porsche 911 (992 II) Cup	2026 Nürburgring Porsche Carrera Cup Germany round
Formula Volkswagen	1:28.882	Sven Barth	Reynard Formula Volkswagen	2002 2nd Nürburgring Formula Volkswagen Germany round
ADAC Formel Masters	1:28.999	Emil Bernstorff	Dallara Formulino	2011 Nürburgring ADAC Formel Masters round
Formula Renault 2.0	1:29.590	Christian Klien	Tatuus FR2000	2002 2nd Nürburgring Formula Renault 2000 Germany round
V8Star Series	1:31.305	Robert Lechner	V8Star car	2003 1st Nürburgring V8Star round
Formula BMW	1:31.641	Sebastian Vettel	Mygale FB02	2004 2nd Nürburgring Formula BMW ADAC Round
GT4	1:33.166	Marcel Lenerz	Toyota GR Supra GT4	2022 Nürburgring ADAC GT4 Germany round
Stock car racing	1:33.268	Ander Vilariño	Chevrolet SS NASCAR	2014 Nürburgring NASCAR Whelen Euro Series round
TCR Touring Car	1:34.825	Martin Andersen	Honda Civic Type R TCR (FK8)	2022 Nürburgring TCR Germany round
NXT Gen Cup	1:49.570	Maxim Dacher	LRT NXT1	2025 Nürburgring NXT Gen Cup round
Truck racing	1:53.474	Norbert Kiss	MAN TGS	2025 Nürburgring ETRC round
Sprint-Strecke (with Mercedes-Benz Arena using old chicane) (2002–present): 3.618 km (2.248 mi)
LMP3	1:21.864	Óscar Tunjo	Duqueine D-08	2022 Nürburgring Prototype Cup Germany round
Superbike	1:23.285	Twan Smits	Yamaha YZF-R1	2026 Nürburgring Euro Moto Superbike round
GT3	1:25.664	Jeroen Bleekemolen	Chevrolet Corvette Z06-R GT3	2013 1st Nürburgring ADAC GT Masters round
Supersport	1:26.090	Dirk Geiger	Yamaha YZF-R9	2026 Nürburgring Euro Moto Supersport round
Formula Renault 2.0	1:26.349	Récardo Bruins Choi	Tatuus FR2000	2005 Nürburgring Formula Renault 2.0 Germany round
ADAC Formel Masters	1:28.704	Alessio Picariello	Dallara Formulino	2013 Nürburgring ADAC Formel Masters round
Sportbike	1:30.202	Tobias Kitzbichler	Aprilia RS660	2026 Nürburgring Euro Moto Sportbike round
Alpine Elf Europa Cup	1:33.004	Nicolas Milan	Alpine A110 Cup	2018 Nürburgring Alpine Elf Europa Cup round
Moto3	1:33.690	Anina Urlaß	Honda NSF250R	2025 Nürburgring Northern Talent Cup round
Supersport 300	1:37.271	Dylan Czarkowski	KTM RC 390 R	2024 Nürburgring IDM Supersport 300 round
Sprint-Strecke (without Mercedes-Benz Arena using F1 chicane) (2002–present): 3.059 km (1.901 mi)
Sprint-Strecke (without Mercedes-Benz Arena using old chicane) (2002–present): 3.050 km (1.895 mi)
GP-Strecke with F1 Chicane (1995–2001): 4.556 km (2.831 mi)
Formula One	1:18.354	Juan Pablo Montoya	Williams FW23	2001 European Grand Prix
LMP900	1:30.418	Frank Biela	Audi R8	2000 1000 km of Nürburgring
F3000	1:31.669	Giorgio Pantano	Lola B99/50	2001 Nürburgring F3000 round
WSC	1:31.794	Grant Orbell	Lola B98/10	1999 ADAC Sportwagen Festival
GT1 (Prototype)	1:33.614	Bernd Schneider	Mercedes-Benz CLK GTR	1997 FIA GT Nürburgring 4 Hours
LMP675	1:37.813	Thed Björk	Lola B2K/40	2001 ADAC Sportwagen Festival
DTM	1:37.932	Martin Tomczyk	Abt-Audi TT-R DTM	2001 1st Nürburgring DTM round
GT1	1:38.270	Jean-Marc Gounon	Ferrari F40 GTE	1996 BPR 4 Hours of Nürburgring
GT1 (GTS)	1:39.649	Olivier Beretta	Dodge Viper GTS-R	2000 1000 km of Nürburgring
Formula Renault 2.0	1:41.135	Marc Benz	Tatuus FR2000	2001 Nürburgring Formula Renault 2000 Germany round
GT2	1:42.208	Olivier Beretta	Chrysler Viper GTS-R	1997 FIA GT Nürburgring 4 Hours
N-GT	1:42.208	Sébastien Dumez	Porsche 911 (996) GT3-RS	2001 FIA GT Nürburgring 500km
GT	1:43.766	Sascha Maassen	Porsche 911 (996) GT3-R	2000 1000 km of Nürburgring
Formula Chrysler	1:45.114	John Svensson	Reynard 2KF	2001 Nürburgring Formula Chrysler Euroseries round
V8Star Series	1:45.428	Roland Asch	V8Star car	2001 1st Nürburgring V8Star round
Porsche Carrera Cup	1:45.643	Timo Bernhard	Porsche 911 (996 I) GT3 Cup	2000 2nd Nürburgring Porsche Carrera Cup Germany round
Formula BMW	1:46.271	Hendrik Vieth	Mygale FB02	2001 1st Nürburgring Formula BMW ADAC Round
GP-Strecke (1984–2001): 4.551 km (2.828 mi)
Group C1	1:21.553	Teo Fabi	Jaguar XJR-14	1991 430 km of Nürburgring
Formula One	1:22.806	Niki Lauda	McLaren MP4/2B	1985 German Grand Prix
F3000	1:26.980	Rubens Barrichello	Reynard 92D	1992 Nürburgring F3000 round
Interserie	1:30.080	Karl Hasenbichler	HSB-Penske PC-18 Buick Turbo Can-Am	1994 AvD New Historics präsentiert von Ferrari Nürburgring
Group C2	1:33.010	Costas Los	Spice SE87C	1988 1000 km of Nürburgring
Class 1 Touring Cars	1:37.710	Bernd Schneider	Mercedes-Benz C-Class V6	1994 3rd Nürburgring DTM round
500cc	1:39.048	Kevin Schwantz	Suzuki RGV500	1990 German motorcycle Grand Prix
World SBK	1:39.318	Troy Corser	Ducati 996 RS	1999 Nürburgring World SBK round
Formula Volkswagen	1:41.049	Florian Stoll	Reynard Formula Volkswagen	2001 1st Nürburgring Formula Volkswagen Germany round
GT1	1:42.430	John Greasley	Porsche 911 GT2 Evo	1998 4 Hours of Nürburgring
250cc	1:40.993	Tetsuya Harada	Aprilia RSV 250	1997 German motorcycle Grand Prix
125cc	1:42.991	Ralf Waldmann	Honda NSR250	1996 German motorcycle Grand Prix
Super Touring	1:43.975	Tom Kristensen	Honda Accord	1999 1st Nürburgring STW Cup round
Porsche Carrera Cup	1:45.322	Timo Bernhard	Porsche 911 (996 I) GT3 Cup	2001 1st Nürburgring Porsche Carrera Cup Germany round
World SSP	1:45.591	Piergiorgio Bontempi	Yamaha YZF-R6	1999 Nürburgring World SSP round
Group A	1:47.740	Armin Hahne	Ford Sierra RS 500	1988 Nürburgring 500 km
Group N	1:48.190	Johnny Cecotto	BMW M3 (E36) GTR	1993 Nürburgring ADAC GT Cup round
Sprint-Strecke (without F1 Chicane) (1984–2001): 3.039 km (1.888 mi)
Group C	0:58.140	Bernd Schneider	Porsche 962C	1991 Int. ADAC Bilstein Supersprint Nürburgring
Interserie	1:01.260	Josef Neuhauser	Minardi M190	2001 Nürburgring Interserie round
DTM	1:05.947	Bernd Schneider	AMG Mercedes-Benz CLK DTM 2001	2001 2nd Nürburgring DTM round
Formula Volkswagen	1:10.187	Walter Lechner Jr.	Reynard Formula Volkswagen	2001 2nd Nürburgring Formula Volkswagen Germany round
Porsche Carrera Cup	1:11.739	Jörg Bergmeister	Porsche 911 (996 I) GT3 Cup	2001 2nd Nürburgring Porsche Carrera Cup Germany round
Group B	1:12.630	Uwe Alzen	Porsche 911 Carrera RSR 3.8	1993 XX. ADAC Bilstein Supersprint Nürburgring
V8Star Series	1:22.701	Christian Hohenadel	V8Star car	2001 3rd Nürburgring V8Star round
Betonschleife (1927–1982): 2.292 km (1.424 mi)
Group 7	0:47.800	Herbert Müller (Note: Both riders took the same lap time independently on different years.); Tim Schenken	Porsche 917/30 TC; Porsche 917/10 TC	1974 Ïnternationaler Redlefsen-Super-Sprint Nürburgring; 1975 Internat. Super Sprint Nürburgring
Group 6	0:48.050	Bob Wollek	Porsche 936/80	1982 Nürburgring Interserie round
Group 5	0:48.550	Manfred Winkelhock	Ford Capri III Turbo	1981 ADAC-Bilstein Super-Sprint Nürburgring
Group C	0:49.220	Rolf Stommelen	Porsche CK5	1982 ADAC-Bilstein Super-Sprint Nürburgring
BMW M1 Procar	0:51.830	Siegfried Müller, Jr.	BMW M1	1982 ADAC-Bilstein Super-Sprint Nürburgring
Group 4	0:52.600	Leo Kinnunen	Porsche 934	1976 III. Int. ADAC-Bilstein-Super-Sprint Nürburgring
Group 2	0:52.900	Klaus Ludwig	BMW 2002 Turbo	1977 Bilstein-Super-Sprint Nürburgring

Lap times recorded on the Nürburgring Nordschleife are published by several manufacturers. They are published and discussed in print media, and online.

- For lap times from various sources, see Nürburgring lap times.
- For lap times in official racing events, on several track variants from 20.830 km (12.943 mi) up to 25.947 km (16.123 mi) see List of Nordschleife lap times (racing).

The lap record on the Südschleife is held by Helmut Kelleners with 2:38.6 minutes = 175.85 km/h (109.27 mph), driven with a March 707 in the CanAm run of the 3rd International AvD SCM circuit race on 18 October 1970. Previous record holder was Brian Redman, who achieved 2:47.0 minutes = 161.03 km/h (100.06 mph) in the Formula 2 race on 21 April 1968 with a Ferrari.

== Competitions ==
Formula racing

- Acceleration 2014 (2014)
- ADAC Formel Masters (2008–2014)
- ATS Formel 3 Cup (1971–1974, 1976–1977, 1979–2010, 2012–2014)
- Auto GP (2001–2004, 2007, 2013–2014)
- BOSS GP (2007–2008, 2010, 2012, 2024–present)
- British Formula 3 International Series (2005, 2011, 2013)
- European Formula Two Championship (1967–1973, 1975–1983)
- FIA Formula 3 European Championship (2012–2018)
- FIA Formula Two Championship (2011–2012)
- F4 Germany Championship (2015–2022, 2027)
- Formula 3 Euro Series (2003–2012)
- Formula BMW ADAC (2000–2007)
- Formula BMW Europe (2009)
- Formula Chrysler Euroseries (2001)
- Formula One
  - German Grand Prix (1927–1939, 1950–1954, 1956–1958, 1961–1969, 1971–1976, 1985, 2009, 2011, 2013)
  - European Grand Prix (1984, 1995–1996, 1999–2007)
  - Luxembourg Grand Prix (1997–1998)
  - Eifel Grand Prix (2020)
- Formula Palmer Audi (2000, 2004)
- Formula Renault 2.0 Germany (1991–1999, 2001–2005)
- Formula Renault Eurocup (1993–1994, 1996, 1999–2001, 2006–2009, 2011–2012, 2014–2015, 2017–2020)
- Formula Renault Northern European Cup (2006–2007, 2009–2018)
- Formula Volkswagen Germany (2001–2003)
- French F4 Championship (2024)
- French Formula Three Championship (1978)
- French Formula Renault Championship (1981)
- International Formula 3000 (1992–1993, 1996–2004)
- GP2 Series (2005–2007, 2009, 2011, 2013)
- GP3 Series (2011, 2013)
- Superleague Formula
  - Superleague Formula round Germany (2008, 2010)
- World Series Formula V8 3.5 (2006–2009, 2011–2012, 2014–2015, 2017)

Sports car racing

- 6 Hours of Nürburgring / 1000 km Nürburgring (1953, 1956–1991, 2000, 2004–2017)
- 24H Series (2026)
- 24 Hours Nürburgring (1970–present)
- ADAC GT Masters (2007–present)
- ADAC GT4 Germany (2019–present)
- Alpine Elf Europa Cup (2018)
- BPR Global GT Series (1995–1996)
- Deutsche Rennsport Meisterschaft (1972–1982, 1984–1985)
- DTM Trophy (2020–2022)
- European Le Mans Series (2004–2009)
- Ferrari Challenge Europe (1996–1999, 2002, 2004, 2006, 2019, 2021, 2024)
- FIA GT Championship (1997, 2001)
- FIA GT1 World Championship (2010, 2012)
- FIA GT3 European Championship (2012)
- FIA Sportscar Championship (1998–2001)
- FIA World Endurance Championship (2015–2017)
- GT World Challenge Europe (2013–2016, 2019–2021, 2023–present)
- GT2 European Series (2027)
- GT3 Revival Series (2026)
- GT4 European Series (2010, 2014–2015, 2017–2021, 2025)
- Intercontinental GT Challenge (2024–present)
- International GT Open (2010, 2012–2014)
- Lamborghini Super Trofeo Europe (2012–2021, 2023–present)
- McLaren Trophy Europe (2023–2025)
- Porsche Carrera Cup Benelux (2019–2020)
- Porsche Carrera Cup France (1999, 2011)
- Porsche Carrera Cup Germany (1986–2019, 2022–present)
- Porsche Carrera Cup Great Britain (2011)
- Porsche Carrera Cup Italia (2011)
- Porsche Carrera Cup Scandinavia (2011, 2018)
- Porsche Supercup (1995–2007, 2009, 2011, 2013)
- Prototype Cup Europe (2026)
- Prototype Cup Germany (2022–2025)
- Renault Sport Trophy (2015)
- Trofeo Maserati (2003, 2005)
- Veranstaltergemeinschaft Langstreckenpokal Nürburgring (1977–present)
- World Sportscar Championship (1953, 1956–1984, 1986–1991)

Touring car racing

- ADAC TCR Germany Touring Car Championship (2016–2022)
- Deutsche Tourenwagen Masters (2000–present)
- Deutsche Tourenwagen Meisterschaft (1984–1996)
- Eurocup Clio (2011–2012, 2014)
- Eurocup Mégane Trophy (2006–2009, 2011–2012)
- European Touring Car Championship (1963–1980, 1982–1986, 1988, 2001)
- European Touring Car Cup (2016–2017)
- NASCAR Whelen Euro Series (2014)
- NXT Gen Cup (2023–present)
- Race of Champions (1989)
- SEAT León Eurocup (2014–2016)
- Super Tourenwagen Cup (1994–1999)
- Superstars Series (2007)
- TCR Europe Touring Car Series (2016, 2021–2022, 2027)
- V8Star Series (2001–2003)
- World Touring Car Championship
  - FIA WTCC Race of Germany (1987, 2015–2017)
- World Touring Car Cup
  - FIA WTCR Race of Germany (2018–2022)

Truck racing

- European Truck Racing Championship
  - ADAC Truck-Grand-Prix (1986–2019, 2022–present)

Motorcycle racing

- FIM Endurance World Championship (1977–1985, 2001)
- Grand Prix motorcycle racing
  - German motorcycle Grand Prix (1955, 1958, 1965, 1968, 1970, 1972, 1974, 1976, 1978, 1980, 1984, 1986, 1988, 1990, 1995–1997)
- IDM Superbike Championship (1990–2012, 2014–2017, 2019, 2024–present)
- Northern Talent Cup (2024–present)
- Sidecar World Championship (1955, 1958, 1965, 1968, 1970, 1972, 1974, 1976, 1978, 1980, 1984, 1986, 1988, 1990, 1995–1997, 1999, 2005)
- Superbike World Championship (1998–1999, 2008–2013)
- Supersport World Championship (1998–1999, 2008–2013)

Rallycross racing

- FIA European Rallycross Championship (2022)
- FIA World Rallycross Championship
  - World RX of Germany (2021–2022)

Cycling

- UCI Road World Championships (1927, 1966, 1978)
- Rad am Ring (2003–present)

=== Current events ===
- 13–14 March: Nürburgring Langstrecken-Serie
- 27–28 March: Nürburgring Langstrecken-Serie
- 10–11 April: Nürburgring Langstrecken-Serie
- 17–19 April: Nürburgring Langstrecken-Serie ADAC Ravenol 24h Nürburgring Qualifying
- 14–17 May: Intercontinental GT Challenge Nürburgring 24 Hours
- 29–31 May: DMV Goodyear Racing Days
- 5–7 June: Rock am Ring
- 12–14 June: BOSS GP Nürburgring Classic
- 19–20 June: Nürburgring Langstrecken-Serie
- 26–28 June: Porsche Sports Cup Deutschland ADAC Racing Weekend Nürburgring, GT Summer Series
- 2–5 July: 24H Series 12H Nürburgring, Prototype Cup Europe, Radical Cup Europe
- 10–12 July: FIA European Truck Racing Championship International ADAC Truck-Grand-Prix, ADAC GT Masters
- 24–26 July: Rad am Ring
- 31 July—1 August: Nürburgring Langstrecken-Serie
- 7–9 August: Oldtimer-Grand-Prix
- 14–16 August: Deutsche Tourenwagen Masters, ADAC GT4 Germany, Porsche Carrera Cup Germany
- 22–23 August: Kölner Kurs
- 28–30 August: GT World Challenge Europe, Lamborghini Super Trofeo Europe, GT3 Revival Series
- 4–6 September: IDM Superbike Championship 41. ADAC-Siegerlandpreis, Moto4 Northern Cup
- 11–13 September: Nürburgring Langstrecken-Serie
- 18–20 September: ADAC 1000 km Revival
- 2–4 October: RGB Saisonfinale
- 9–10 October: Nürburgring Langstrecken-Serie
- 16–18 October: ADAC Westfalen Trophy

== Climate ==
The Nürburgring is known for its frequently changing weather. The near-fatal accident of Niki Lauda in 1976 was accompanied by poor weather conditions and also the 2007 Grand Prix race saw an early deluge take several cars out through aquaplaning, with Vitantonio Liuzzi making a lucky escape, hitting a retrieving truck with the rear wing first, rather than the fatal accident that befell Jules Bianchi seven years later at Suzuka. In spite of this reputation, the Nürburg weather station only recorded an average of 679.3 mm (26.74 in) between 1981 and 2010. Contrasting this, the relatively nearby Ardennes racetrack of Spa-Francorchamps in Wallonia, Belgium has a much rainier climate, as can be implied by data from the village hosting the track called Stavelot and the village of Malmedy, through which the circuit passes.

Nürburg has a semi-continental climate with both oceanic and continental tendencies. It does however land in the former category (Köppen Cfb). Due to the Nordschleife's varied terrain and elevation, weather may be completely different on either end of the track. The elevation shift also makes thermal differences a strong possibility. The modern Grand Prix circuit also has sizeable elevation changes between the start-finish straight and the lowest point on the opposite end of the track, but the geographical distance and actual elevation gain between the two are lower. Annual sunshine is in the 1500s, which is low by European standards, but only slightly gloomier than the nearest large city of Cologne located on a plain. Contrasting that, Nürburg has cooler weather year-round due to the higher elevation of the Eifel Mountains than the Rhine Valley.

Climate data for Nürburg, 485 m asl (1981–2010 normals)
Month	Jan	Feb	Mar	Apr	May	Jun	Jul	Aug	Sep	Oct	Nov	Dec	Year
Record high °C (°F)	13.5 (56.3)	15.6 (60.1)	20.7 (69.3)	25.8 (78.4)	30.4 (86.7)	33.3 (91.9)	34.9 (94.8)	36.0 (96.8)	30.2 (86.4)	25.2 (77.4)	18.8 (65.8)	12.6 (54.7)	36.0 (96.8)
Mean daily maximum °C (°F)	2.6 (36.7)	4.3 (39.7)	7.7 (45.9)	12.3 (54.1)	16.4 (61.5)	19.7 (67.5)	21.6 (70.9)	21.4 (70.5)	17.0 (62.6)	12.5 (54.5)	6.6 (43.9)	2.8 (37.0)	12.2 (54.0)
Daily mean °C (°F)	0.3 (32.5)	1.6 (34.9)	4.2 (39.6)	8.0 (46.4)	11.9 (53.4)	15.0 (59.0)	16.9 (62.4)	16.6 (61.9)	13.0 (55.4)	9.2 (48.6)	4.3 (39.7)	0.6 (33.1)	8.6 (47.5)
Mean daily minimum °C (°F)	−2.1 (28.2)	−1.2 (29.8)	0.7 (33.3)	3.6 (38.5)	7.5 (45.5)	10.1 (50.2)	12.2 (54.0)	11.9 (53.4)	9.0 (48.2)	5.9 (42.6)	2.0 (35.6)	−1.6 (29.1)	4.9 (40.8)
Record low °C (°F)	−18.6 (−1.5)	−17.4 (0.7)	−12.4 (9.7)	−6.4 (20.5)	−1.0 (30.2)	2.1 (35.8)	5.0 (41.0)	3.6 (38.5)	1.1 (34.0)	−5.3 (22.5)	−10.8 (12.6)	−18.1 (−0.6)	−18.6 (−1.5)
Average precipitation mm (inches)	48.0 (1.89)	51.2 (2.02)	50.6 (1.99)	47.4 (1.87)	60.6 (2.39)	53.8 (2.12)	68.9 (2.71)	77.7 (3.06)	57.0 (2.24)	54.1 (2.13)	57.5 (2.26)	51.5 (2.03)	678.3 (26.71)
Average precipitation days	9.5	10.6	10.9	9.4	9.9	9.8	11.4	9.5	9.6	10.5	12.0	10.8	123.9
Mean monthly sunshine hours	56.7	72.1	116.6	166.9	187.0	205.3	204.4	193.3	147.1	105.7	46.5	43.0	1,544.6
Source: Météo Climat

== See also ==
- List of Formula One circuits
