= GT3 Revival Series =

Classic auto racing championship

- GT3 Revival Series logo since 2026
- Category: Historic motorsport Sports car racing
- Region: Europe
- Inaugural season: 2026
- Classes: Pro-Am • Am
- GT classes: Gen I • Gen II
- Manufacturers: Aston Martin • Audi • BMW • Chevrolet • Ferrari • Ford • Lamborghini • McLaren • Mercedes-AMG • Mosler • Nissan • Porsche
- Tyre suppliers: Pirelli
- Official website: gt3revivalseries.com

The GT3 Revival Series is a historic racing championship launched by SRO Motorsports Group and Peter Auto to celebrate the 20th anniversary of the GT3 category. Debuting in 2026, the series provides a dedicated competitive home for first-generation GT3 machinery, focusing on cars homologated between 2006 and 2013. These vehicles are divided into two distinct era (Gen I and Gen II) to ensure balanced and era-appropriate competition.

The championship is designed with a "modern-historic" philosophy. While it honours the heritage of the cars, it utilises SRO's Balance of Performance (BoP) and spec Pirelli tyres to create a level playing field. Geared towards a mix of professional and amateur drivers, the series uses a Pro-Am and Am class structure.

== History ==
The GT3 Revival Series was announced on 16 June 2025 during the 2025 24 Hours of Le Mans weekend. It was announced as a collaboration between Peter Auto, a renowned organiser of classic motorsport events and rallies, such as the Le Mans Classic, Tour Auto and the Rally des Légendes, and the SRO Motorsports Group. The series will be set up for the first wave of FIA GT3 cars homologated from 2006 to 2013. The first season of competition took place in 2026, marking the 20th anniversary of GT3 regulations, introduced by SRO to the FIA in 2005, and first raced in 2006 at Silverstone. The GT3 Revival Series marked the latest collaboration between SRO and Peter Auto, with their respective founders, Stéphane Ratel and Patrick Peter, having organised their first race together in 1993 before establishing the BPR Global GT Series with Jürgen Barth.

During the 2025 24 Hours of Spa, it was announced that the series would take the shape of a five-round championship. The first five-round calendar was also introduced, with races at the Le Mans Classic, in partnership with the Automobile Club de l'Quest, and Spa Classic, as well as in support of GT World Challenge Europe weekends. The announcements also confirmed the use of Balance of Performance for the homologated cars.

In March 2026, the series debuted at the Peter Auto Test Days at Circuit Paul Ricard. Among the 20 cars representing seven brands, participants included both established private race teams and professional drivers. Notable entries included 2024 WRC Champion and 22-time rally winner Thierry Neuville, who aimed to run a VDS Racing BMW Z4 in the debut year of the series, though ultimately did not. The opening round for the new championship took take place at Circuit Paul Ricard on the 10–12 April 2026 with a field of 31 cars split across nine manufacturers. Later in the season, during the 2026 24 Hours of Spa, SRO's flagship event, it was announced that the GT3 Revival Series would be part of the 2027 event’s support programme. The championship was also confirmed to debut at the Hungaroring alongside the GT World Challenge Europe, which returns after a six year hiatus.

== Format ==
The series is open to cars homologated according to FIA GT3 regulations between 2006 and 2013. The field is separated into two categories: Gen I (2006–2009) and Gen II (2010–2013). Both generations compete simultaneously across Pro-Am (a Gold or Silver driver paired with a Bronze driver) and Am (two Bronze drivers sharing a car, or a single Bronze driver racing solo) classes. Points are awarded on the standard basis of 25 for the winner down to one point for 10th position. In addition to the class championships, crews with a combined age of 100 and over, or a solo driver aged 60 and over, are eligible to compete for the Iron Cup.

All cars use a controlled Pirelli P Zero DHG tyre, with four new sets provided for the opening round at Le Castellet and three, plus a carryover set, available thereafter (unlimited Pirelli Cinturato WHB wet tyres), and SRO Motorsports Group officials will manage the BoP. Notable eligible include the Aston Martin DBRS9, BMW Z4 GT3, Ford Matech GT, Nissan GT-R NISMO GT3 and Mercedes-Benz SLS AMG GT3.

The inaugural 2026 season featured a five-round calendar at iconic European circuits, many of which also hosted rounds of the modern GT World Challenge Europe series. Rounds 1, 2, 4, and 5 featured a standard format of 220 minutes of track time, including 90 minutes of practice, two 15-minute qualifying sessions (from which the polesitter in each class earns a point), and a pair of 50-minute races, including a mandatory pit stop, set to a minimum time, between the 20th and 30th minute. Additionally, cars classified in the top three in a race are required to serve an additional success penalty in the following race.

The Le Mans Classic round (round 3), however, employed a unique format, with 170 minutes of track time. The round featured two 35-minute qualifying races to set the grids for both main 40-minute races. Additionally, it was possible for one-off entries to enter the Le Mans Classic round provided they had run at least one of the preceding rounds at Circuit Paul Ricard or Spa Classic.

== Circuits ==
- (France) Circuit Paul Ricard (2026–2027)
- (Belgium) Circuit de Spa-Francorchamps (2026–2027)
- (France) Circuit de la Sarthe (2026)
- (Germany) Nürburgring (2026)
- (Spain) Circuit de Barcelona-Catalunya (2026–2027)
- (France) Dijon-Prenois (2027)
- (Hungary) Hungaroring (2027)

== Champions ==
GT3 Revival Series

Season	Pro-Am Champion	Vehicle	Am Gen 1 Champion	Vehicle	Am Gen 2 Champion	Vehicle
2026	(France) Jean-Luc Beaubélique	Ferrari 458 Italia GT3	(France) Éric Debard	Ford GT GT3	(Germany) Heiko Neumann	Mercedes-Benz SLS AMG GT3
