= Yamaha 250 V4 =

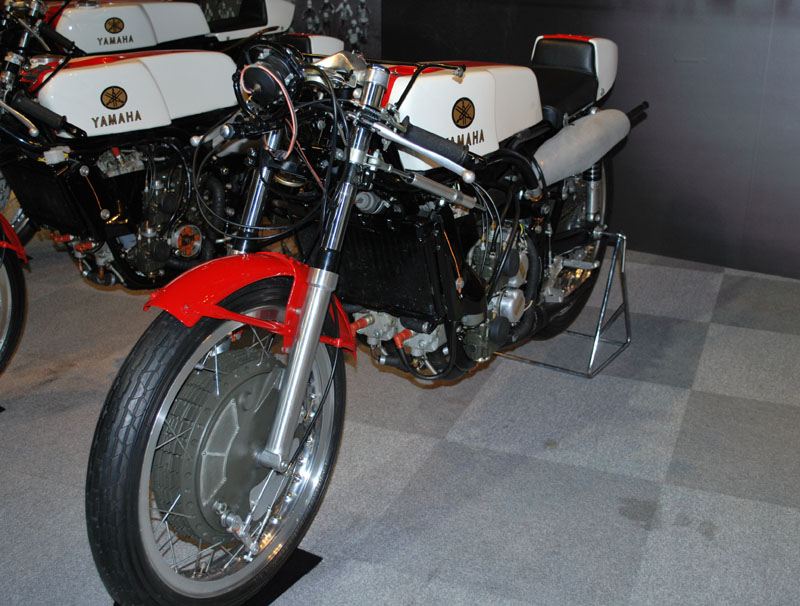
- Manufacturer: Yamaha
- Production: 1967–1968
- Class: 250 cc
- Engine: 246.3 cc (15.03 cu in) 2-stroke, liquid-cooled, 70° V4
- Bore / stroke: 44 mm × 40.5 mm (1.73 in × 1.59 in)
- Top speed: 144 mph (232 km/h)
- Power: > 73 hp (54 kW) @ 14000 rpm
- Transmission: 8-speed, chain final drive
- Suspension: Telescopic forks (front); swing arm with twin spring/shock absorbers (rear)
- Brakes: Twin leading-shoe drum (front & rear)

Yamaha 250 V4 (RD05A) is an air-cooled road racing motorcycle made by Yamaha, produced between 1967 and 1968, and competed until 1972.
