= 2019 Brands Hatch W Series round =

2019 Brands Hatch W Series Round
- Race 6 of 6 of the 2019 W Series

Race details
- Date: 11 August 2019
- Official name: 2019 W Series Brands Hatch round
- Location: Brands Hatch, West Kingsdown, England, United Kingdom
- Course: Permanent circuit
- Course length: 3.916 km (2.432 miles)
- Distance: 21 laps, 82.236 km (51.072 miles)

Pole position
- Driver: (United Kingdom) Jamie Chadwick
- Time: 1:22.425

Fastest lap
- Driver: (Finland) Emma Kimiläinen
- Time: 1:23.301

Podium
- First: (United Kingdom) Alice Powell
- Second: (Finland) Emma Kimiläinen
- Third: (Netherlands) Beitske Visser

The 2019 W Series Brands Hatch round (also commercially referred to as #WRace6) was the sixth and final round of the 2019 W Series, and took place at Brands Hatch in the United Kingdom on 11 August 2019. The event was an undercard to the 2019 Deutsche Tourenwagen Masters round at the same circuit.

== Report ==
=== Background ===
Heading into the final race, two drivers were in contention for the championship – Jamie Chadwick and Beitske Visser. Chadwick, winner of the opening race at Hockenheim as well as in Misano, sits 13 points ahead of Zolder winner Visser. For Visser to win the championship she needs:

- To finish 1st with Chadwick 4th, therefore both drivers would be level on 110 points with two wins apiece however Visser would win on count-back with two second-place finishes to Chadwick's one.
- To finish 1st with Chadwick 5th or lower.
- To finish 2nd with Chadwick 8th or lower.
- To finish 3rd with Chadwick 10th or lower.

If Visser were to finish 3rd with Chadwick 9th, that would also see both drivers draw level on 100 points apiece however Chadwick would win the championship with two wins to Visser's one.

With the top 12 in the championship at seasons' end automatically invited to return to the series in 2020, seven drivers have guaranteed their place should they choose to return – Chadwick, Visser, Marta García, Alice Powell, Fabienne Wohlwend, Emma Kimiläinen and Miki Koyama.

The day before the event began, W Series management confirmed that both reserve drivers, Vivien Keszthelyi and Sarah Bovy, would take part in the final round of the championship – the first time all 20 drivers would be on track in a championship race.

=== Practice ===
The opening session of the weekend would be dominated by Emma Kimiläinen, setting the first representative time and never relinquishing the lead despite wet-dry conditions. Championship leader Chadwick would be second with a time 4-tenths slower than the Finn, with 3rd placed Sarah Moore over a second behind Kimiläinen. It would be a disastrous start to the event for championship challenger Visser, finishing the session 20th and last with electrical problems. Elsewhere, Miki Koyama would suffer from technical issues while Sabré Cook would bring out the yellow flags with a spin into the gravel at Druids.

The weather would clear for FP2 and once again it was Kimiläinen who would finish the session fastest, three tenths ahead of Alice Powell and a full second ahead of Chadwick. Visser would finish 8th, seven tenths behind Chadwick and directly behind Fabienne Wohlwend – who would bring out the red flag with a spin at Paddock Hill Bend. Cook would once again beach the #37 during the session. Reserve drivers Bovy and Keszthelyi would finish the final practice session of the season in 16th and 20th respectively.

=== Qualifying ===
The championship ended the same way it started, with Chadwick on pole position. British drivers would complete the top three, with Powell second and Esmee Hawkey a surprise third. Kimiläinen would finish the session fourth having fought Powell for pole position across the majority of the session, with Visser and Wohlwend setting identical times in fifth and sixth however – crucially for Visser – the Dutchwoman would set her time first, gifting her the higher position.

Further down the field, Marta García continued her form slump from Assen qualifying 11th. Rdest and Wood had a turnaround of fortunes from the previous round, qualifying 13th and 14th respectively and under threat of losing their top 12 positions in the championship to third-placed Hawkey. Shea Holbrook would have the only incident of the session, spinning at the exit of Stirlings in the dying minutes.

=== Race ===
Chadwick led the race from pole position, however Hawkey stalled the car from P3 on the grid. Wohlwend would also get a slow start, however was only overtaken by Koyama as the stalling Hawkey provided a bottleneck on the grid. Koyama's joy would be short-lived, as she was handed a drive-through penalty for being out of position on the grid. Further compounding to Hawkey's woes, the Briton was also handed a PLP for a jump-start. Further down the field, Sarah Bovy received a mechanical black flag for a broken front wing.

Second placed Powell began exerting pressure on race leader Chadwick, and with ten minutes of the race time elapsed the older Briton snuck up the inside of the championship leader at Paddock Hill Bend. Emma Kimiläinen, having benefitted from Hawkey's stall, also took advantage of Powell's move and went around the outside of Chadwick at Graham Hill Bend. This allowed championship challenger Visser to close on Chadwick, however she could not get the move done. Koyama's troublesome afternoon continued with a trip into the gravel at Paddock Hill.

The race would soon get worse for the Japanese driver, with a spin on the entry to Sheene Curve prompting the deployment of the Safety Car. The top five would breakaway from the fight for sixth between Vittoria Piria and Jessica Hawkins on the restart, and the championship combatants would begin to fight. With three laps remaining, Chadwick would run wide at Westfield, with Visser sneaking up the inside at Dingle Dell with two wheels on the grass. The loss of position would allow Wohlwend to close up to the championship leader in the fight for 4th place.

Following 21 laps, Alice Powell would become the fifth and final winner of the season, with Kimiläinen close behind in second and Visser taking the final podium position in third. Chadwick would hold onto fourth place and clinched the title by ten points ahead of Wohlwend in fifth, who slipped behind Kimiläinen in the championship and missed the overall top five by two points. Piria and Hawkins would hold station in sixth and seventh, with Hawkins crucially claiming twelfth in the championship and the last automatic invitation to the 2020 season. The top ten positions would be rounded out by Marta García, Sabré Cook and Sarah Moore. Caitlin Wood's 11th place would see her miss the championship top 12 by one point, whereas a P12 finish for Tasmin Pepper did not seriously hinder her championship and remained inside the top ten. 13th place for Gosia Rdest dropped her outside the invite slots, and Keszthelyi finished as the best reserve driver in both the race and championship with 14th. Naomi Schiff rounded off a mediocre season with 15th, and Hawkey's weekend of promise ended in a 16th place. Holbrook beat Megan Gilkes in the battle of the backmarkers to 17th, Bovy's broken wing left her 19th and Koyama rounded out the field in 20th and two laps down.

== Classification ==
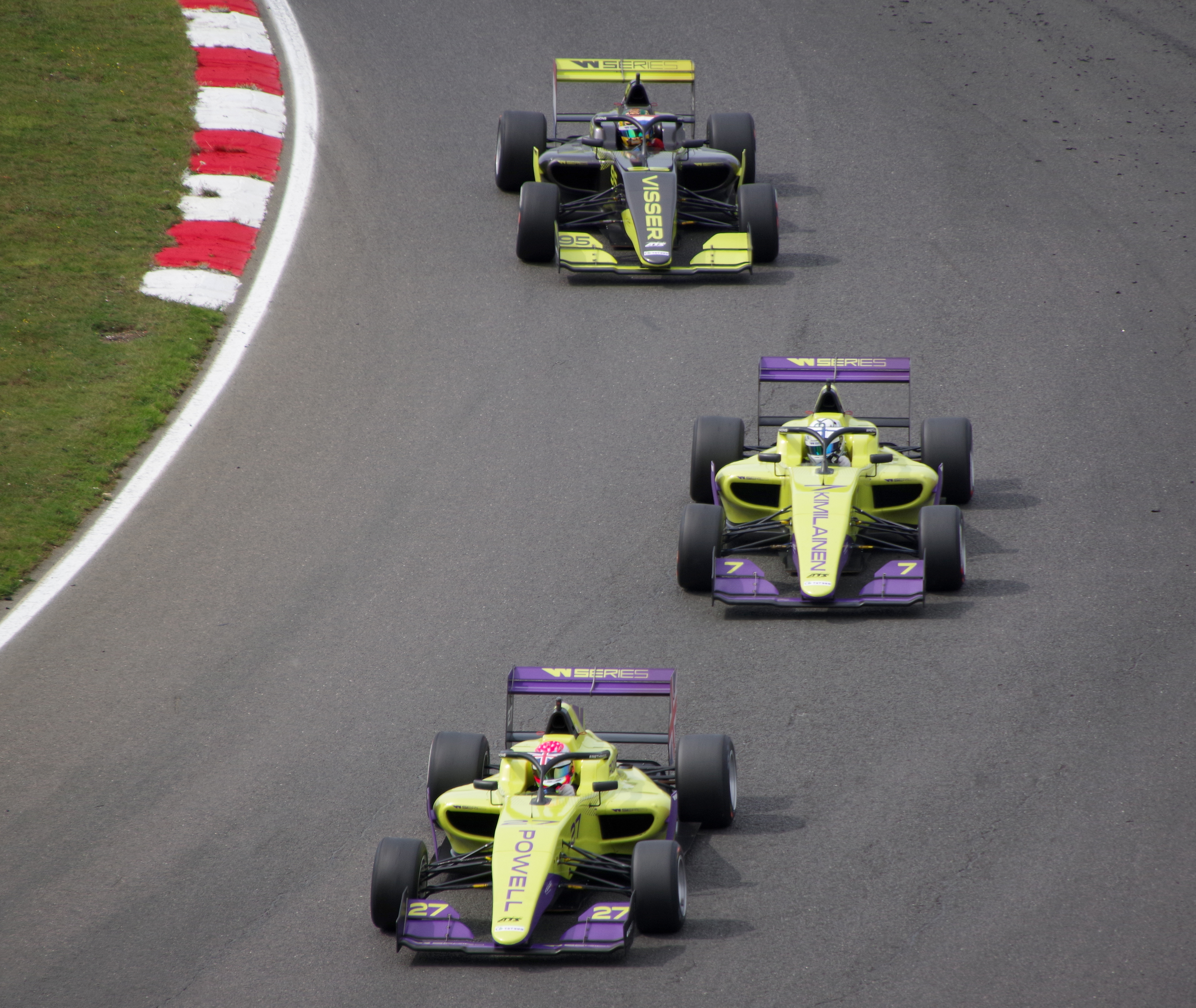
The podium finishers in order: Powell, Kimiläinen, Visser.

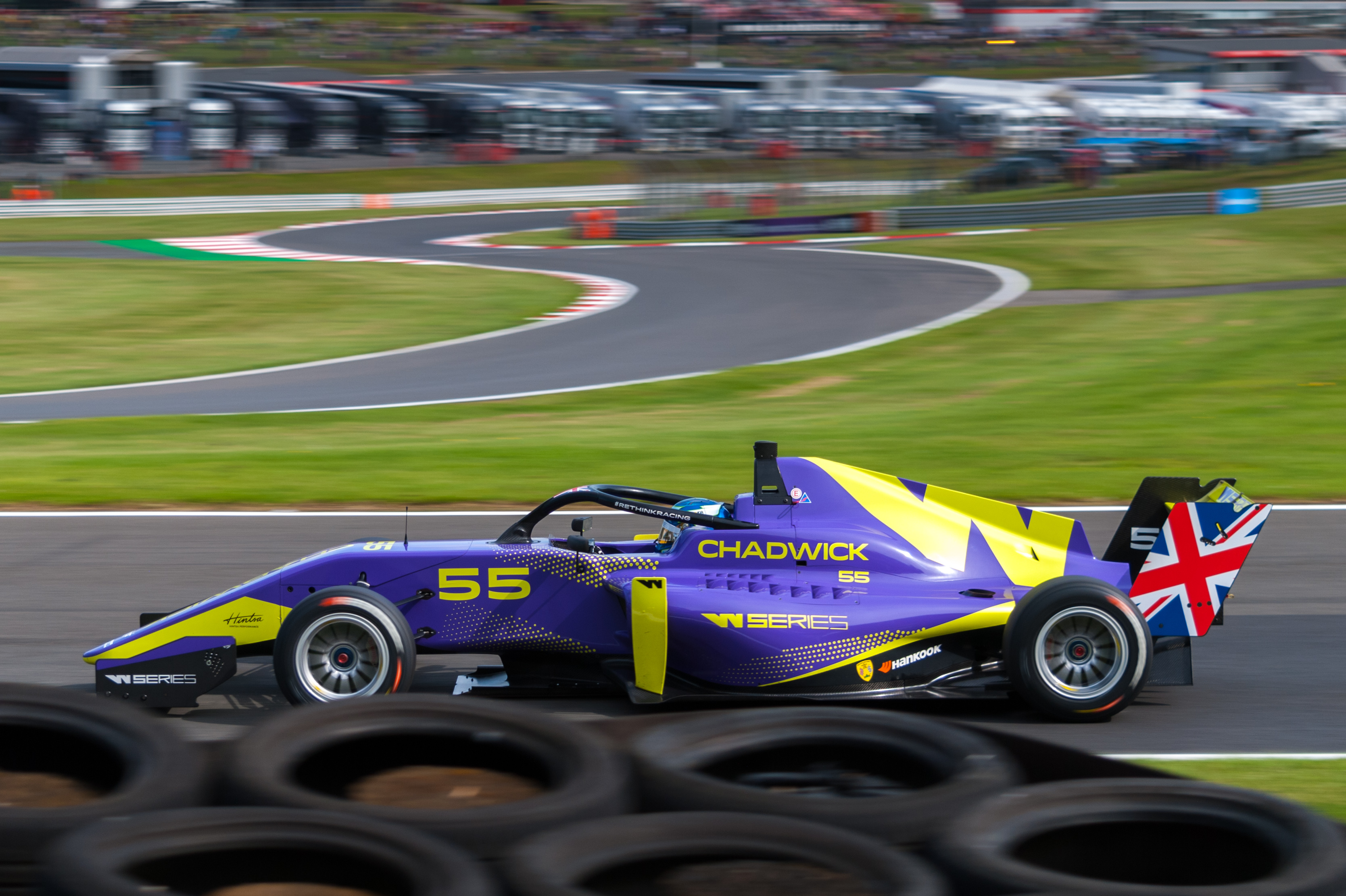
Jamie Chadwick took pole position and finished fourth in the race to claim the first W Series championship.

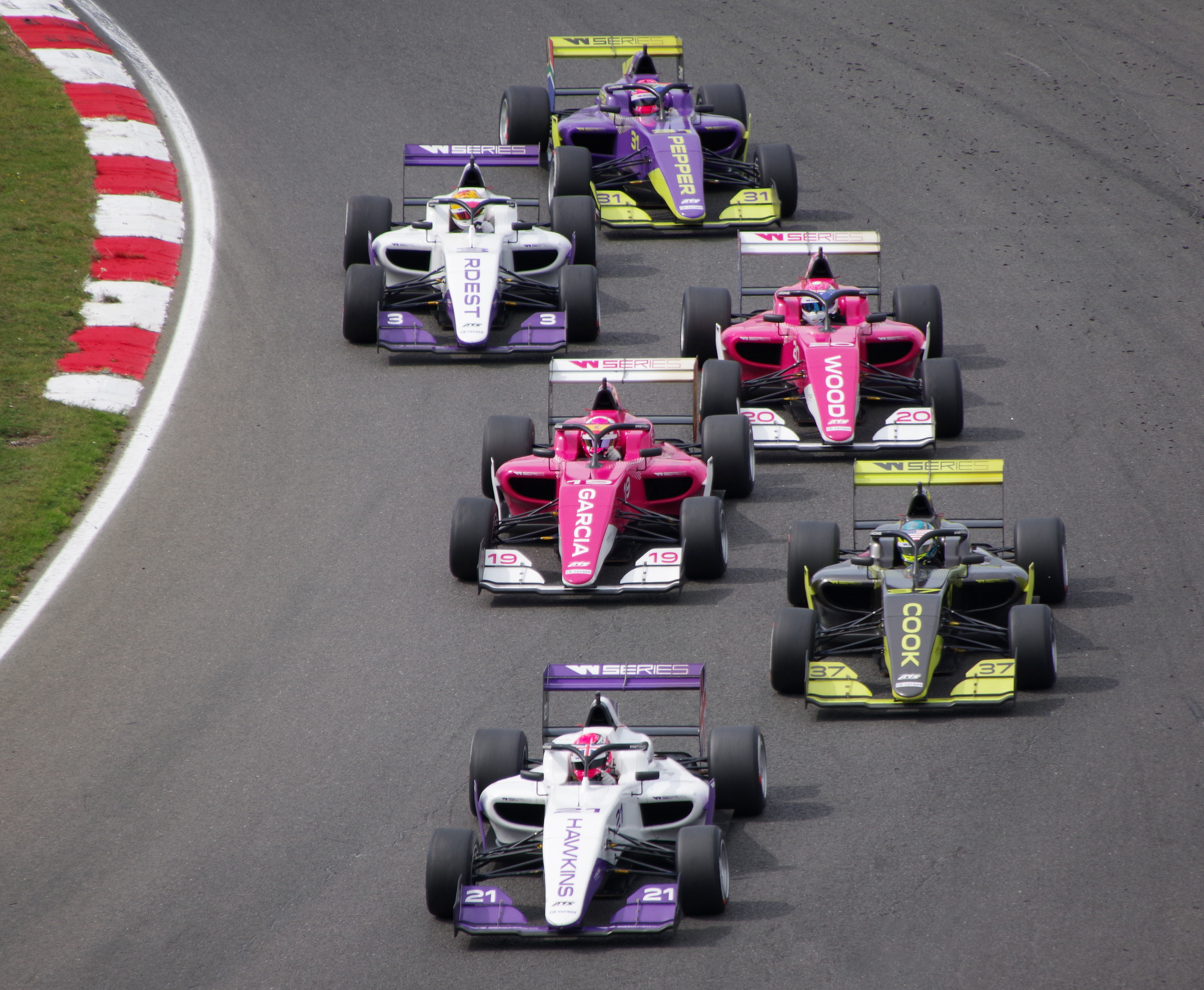
The fight for the minor points placings led by Jessica Hawkins.

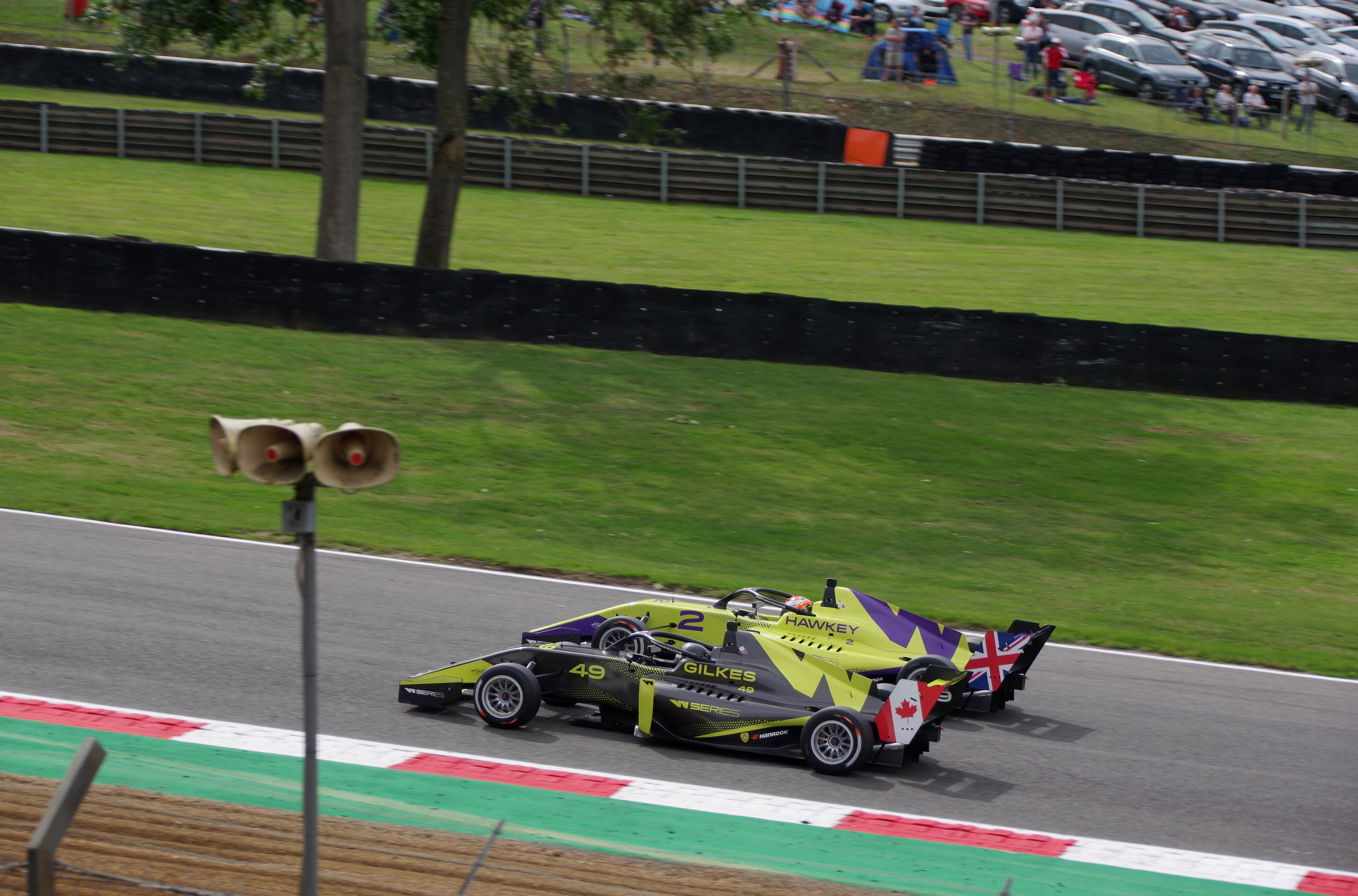
Megan Gilkes and Esmee Hawkey battle at the tail of the field.

=== Practice ===
Session	No.	Driver	Time	Condts
Practice 1	7	(Finland) Emma Kimiläinen	1:33.427	Mixed
Practice 2	7	(Finland) Emma Kimiläinen	1:23.365	Dry

=== Qualifying ===
Pos.	No.	Driver	Time/Gap	Grid
1	55	(United Kingdom) Jamie Chadwick	1:22.425	1
2	27	(United Kingdom) Alice Powell	+0.368	2
3	2	(United Kingdom) Esmee Hawkey	+0.439	3
4	7	(Finland) Emma Kimiläinen	+0.476	4
5	95	(Netherlands) Beitske Visser	+0.785	5
6	5	(Liechtenstein) Fabienne Wohlwend	+0.785	6
7	85	(Japan) Miki Koyama	+0.901	7
8	26	(United Kingdom) Sarah Moore	+1.109	8
9	21	(United Kingdom) Jessica Hawkins	+1.147	9
10	11	(Italy) Vittoria Piria	+1.182	10
11	19	(Spain) Marta García	+1.376	11
12	37	(United States) Sabré Cook	+1.425	12
13	3	(Poland) Gosia Rdest	+1.793	13
14	20	(Australia) Caitlin Wood	+1.891	14
15	31	(South Africa) Tasmin Pepper	+1.913	15
16	58	(Belgium) Sarah Bovy	+2.145	16
17	77	(Hungary) Vivien Keszthelyi	+2.350	17
18	49	(Canada) Megan Gilkes	+2.445	18
19	67	(United States) Shea Holbrook	+2.777	19
20	99	(Germany) Naomi Schiff	+2.926	20

=== Race ===
Pos.	No.	Driver	Laps	Time/Retired	Grid	Pts
1	27	(United Kingdom) Alice Powell	21	31:24.967	2	25
2	7	(Finland) Emma Kimiläinen	21	+0.511	4	18
3	95	(Netherlands) Beitske Visser	21	+5.784	5	15
4	55	(United Kingdom) Jamie Chadwick	21	+9.321	1	12
5	5	(Liechtenstein) Fabienne Wohlwend	21	+9.732	6	10
6	11	(Italy) Vittoria Piria	21	+10.730	10	8
7	21	(United Kingdom) Jessica Hawkins	21	+11.060	9	6
8	19	(Spain) Marta García	21	+11.613	11	4
9	37	(United States) Sabré Cook	21	+12.179	12	2
10	26	(United Kingdom) Sarah Moore	21	+13.420	8	1
11	20	(Australia) Caitlin Wood	21	+13.881	14	
12	31	(South Africa) Tasmin Pepper	21	+14.221	15	
13	3	(Poland) Gosia Rdest	21	+14.735	13	
14	77	(Hungary) Vivien Keszthelyi	21	+18.656	17	
15	99	(Germany) Naomi Schiff	21	+20.585	20	
16	2	(United Kingdom) Esmee Hawkey	21	+20.755	3	
17	67	(United States) Shea Holbrook	21	+20.839	19	
18	49	(Canada) Megan Gilkes	21	+21.681	18	
19	58	(Belgium) Sarah Bovy	21	+22.061	16	
20	85	(Japan) Miki Koyama	19	+2 laps	7	
Fastest lap set by Emma Kimiläinen: 1:23.301

== Championship standings ==
+/-	Pos.	Driver	Pts	Gap
	1	(United Kingdom) Jamie Chadwick	110	
	2	(Netherlands) Beitske Visser	100	-10
1	3	(United Kingdom) Alice Powell	76	-34
1	4	(Spain) Marta García	66	-44
1	5	(Finland) Emma Kimiläinen	53	-57

== See also ==
- 2019 DTM Brands Hatch round

Previous race: 2019 W Series Assen round	W Series; 2019 season	Next race: 2021 W Series Spielberg round
