= Shea Holbrook =

American racing driver

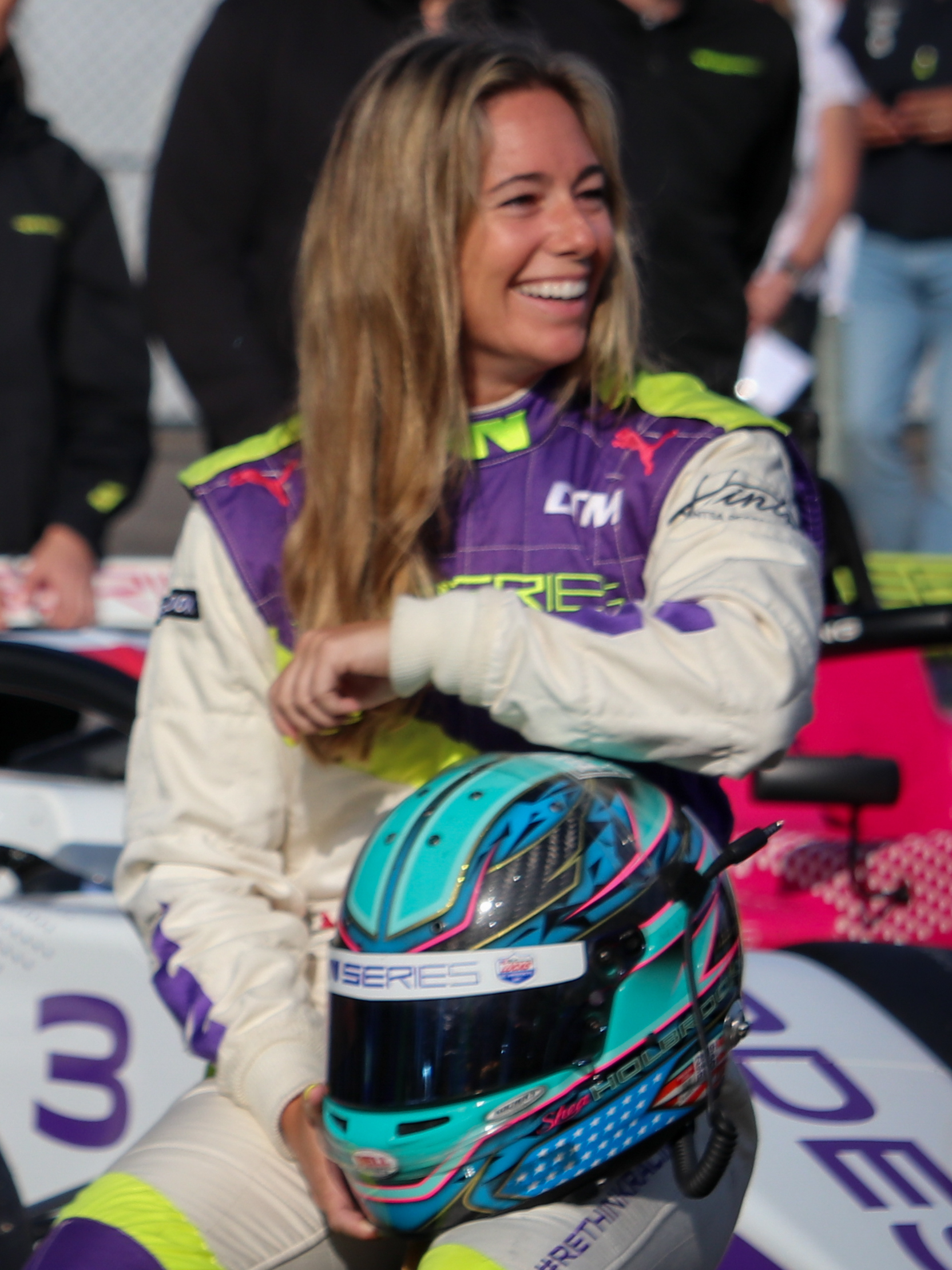
- Holbrook in 2019
- Nationality: (United States) American
- Born: April 10, 1990 (age 36) Jacksonville, Florida, U.S.

Lamborghini Super Trofeo career
- Current team: Precision Performance Motorsports
- Categorisation: FIA Silver
- Car number: 67
- Engine: Lamborghini V10
- Former teams: Shea Racing
- Wins: 8
- Podiums: 27
- Poles: 13
- Finished last season: 5th

Previous series
- 2010–2017: Pirelli World Challenge; IHRA Nitro Jam Drag Racing; IMSA

Shea Holbrook (born April 10, 1990) is an American professional racing driver, entrepreneur and spokeswoman.

Drafting with Denise Mueller-Korenek, Holbrook drove a dragster supporting world record for paced bicycle land speed at the Bonneville Salt Flats in 2018. The two traveled an average of 183.932 mph (296.010 km/h). Denise Mueller-Korenek set the world record.

== Early life ==
Holbrook was raised in Groveland, Florida. She graduated from the University of Central Florida in 2012, earning a Bachelor of Science degree in communication with a minor in marketing.

== Racing ==
Holbrook began her professional racing career with the Sports Car Club of America in 2010. She became the first woman to win the Grand Prix of Long Beach in a touring car during the 2011 Pirelli World Challenge season, and is one of only four women to ever win at the track. Holbrook says that she became interested in racing after attending Richard Petty’s Driving Experience.

Holbrook received her first taste of international motorsport having qualified for the 2019 W Series, a Formula 3 championship for women. One of two Americans in a European-based series (alongside Sabré Cook), she struggled heavily for pace and often found herself at the back of the field with inexperienced Canadian Megan Gilkes – highlighted by qualifying eight seconds away from the pole time in the opening round at the Hockenheimring. She finished the championship 18th and as the only driver to have contested all races to not score points, with 12th place in Zolder her best result.

== Other ==
In 2016, Holbrook was the pace vehicle driver when Denise Mueller-Korenek set a women's world record for the fastest speed on a paced bicycle with an official speed of 147.75 mph on Utah's Bonneville Salt Flats; no woman had ever attempted the mark before. Mueller-Korenek is the official record holder, with Holbrook only listed in articles a support driver. Holbrook again paired with Mueller-Korenek in 2018 to break the world record for paced cycling, reaching a speed of 183.9 mph (296.0 km/h).

== Business ==
Holbrook is involved in many aspects of the motorsport and automotive industries including, keynote and panel public speaking, television, automotive experiential and marketing programs, professional driver coaching, hospitality and marketing management. Companies she has developed programs and have worked alongside include, Cadillac, Jaguar, Mercedes AMG, Performance Racing Industry, SEMA, Women in Automotive, Sports Car Club of America’s Track Night in America, CBS Sports Network, and the Wall Street Journal among others.

== Achievements ==
- 2017 – Two Top Five's in the North American Lamborghini Super Trofeo Series
- 2017 – Top Ten in Pirelli World Challenge Touring Car Championship
- 2016 – Top Five in Pirelli World Challenge Touring Car Championship
- 2015 – Top Three in IHRA Jet Dragster Championship
- 2014 – 2nd Place in the Pirelli World Challenge Touring Car A Championship
- 2014 – Recipient of the Women’s Sports Foundations Project Podium Grant
- 2013 – 7th place in the Pirelli World Challenge Touring Car B Championships
- 2012 – 4th place in the Pirelli World Challenge Touring Car Championships
- 2012 – Shea received the “Living Legend Honoree Award” for her on and off track efforts, and was honored in the “Women in Motorsports”, SuperCars Super Show Exhibit and was featured in Teen Vogue and Jalopnik
- 2012 – Shea became a member of the all-female TRUECar Racing Women Empowered Initiative
- 2011 – Toyota Grand Prix of Long Beach Pirelli World Challenge Touring Car 1st Place – first female driver to win a Touring Car race
- 2010 – First professional year of racing taking 6th place in the SCCA Pro Racing World Challenge Touring Car Championships
- 2009 – Central Florida Region SCCA Champion for H1
- 2009 – Track Record 1:30.027 at West Palm International Raceway class P2
- 2008 – Women in the Winners Circle (Lyn St. James Foundation) received Cooper Tire & Rubber Company Scholarship
- 2008 – 25 Hours Of ThunderHill 2008, team DivaSpeed, 6th in class, 31st overall of 68
- 2008 – First female alternate for the 2008 VW Jetta TDI Cup
- 2007 – Sobre Rodas Talent of the Year award (another winner Helio Castroneves)

== Racing record ==
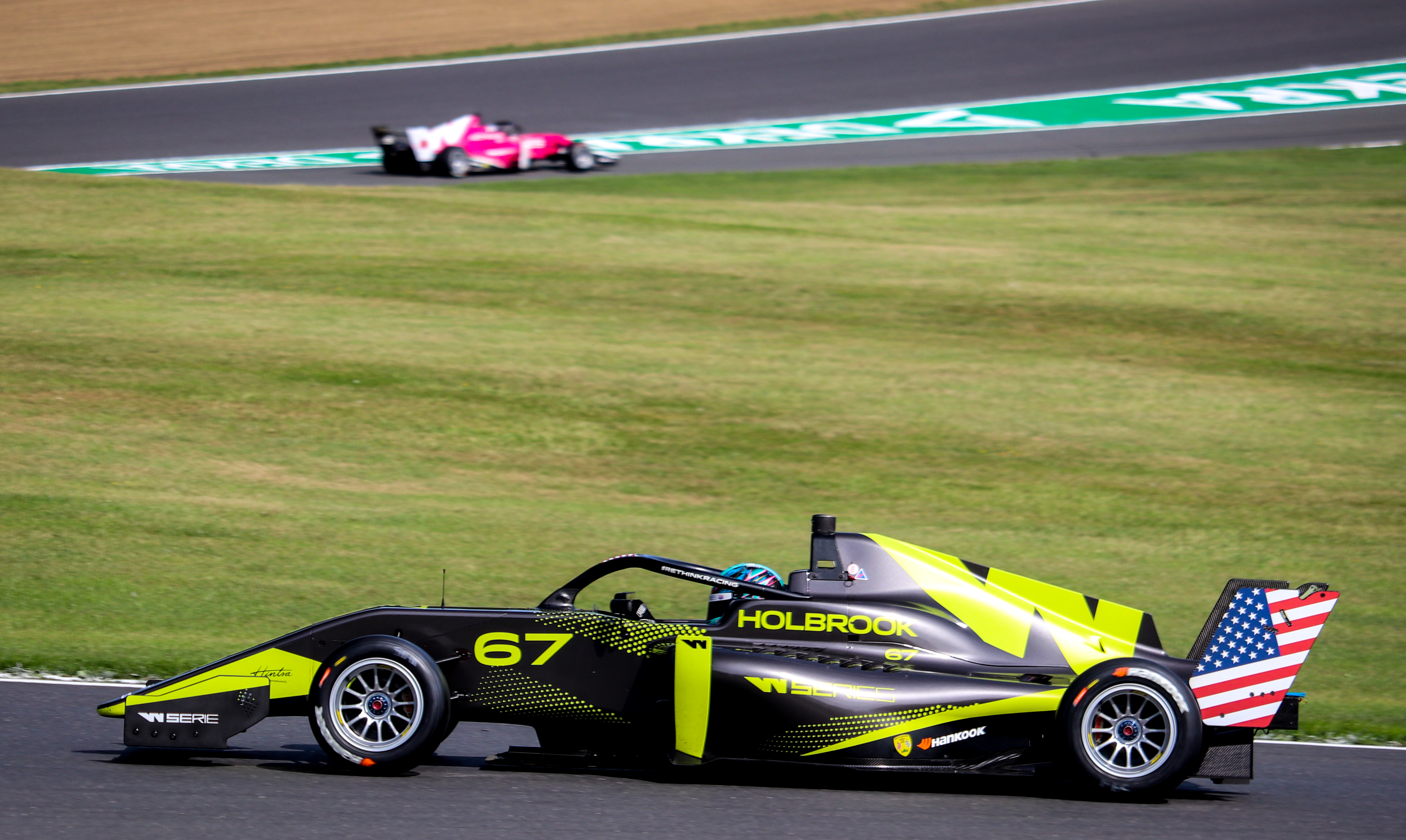
Holbrook at the 2019 W Series Brands Hatch round

=== Complete W Series results ===
(key) (Races in bold indicate pole position) (Races in italics indicate fastest lap)

Year	Team	1	2	3	4	5	6	DC	Points
2019	Hitech GP	HOC; 16	ZOL; 12	MIS; 16	NOR; 15	ASS; 16	BRH; 17	18th	0
