= Esmee Hawkey =

British internet personality and former racing driver (born 1998)

- Nationality: (United Kingdom) British
- Born: Esmee Anna Hawkey; 2 March 1998 (age 28) Chislehurst, Greater London, England

Deutsche Tourenwagen Masters
- Categorisation: FIA Silver
- Years active: 2021–2022
- Teams: T3 Motorsport
- Starts: 20
- Wins: 0
- Poles: 0
- Fastest laps: 0
- Best finish: 20th in 2021

Previous series
- 2014–2015 2018–2020 2019: Ginetta Junior Championship; Porsche Carrera Cup Great Britain; W Series

Esmee Anna Fern (née Hawkey, born 2 March 1998 in Chislehurst) is a British internet personality and former racing driver, who previously competed in the Deutsche Tourenwagen Masters.

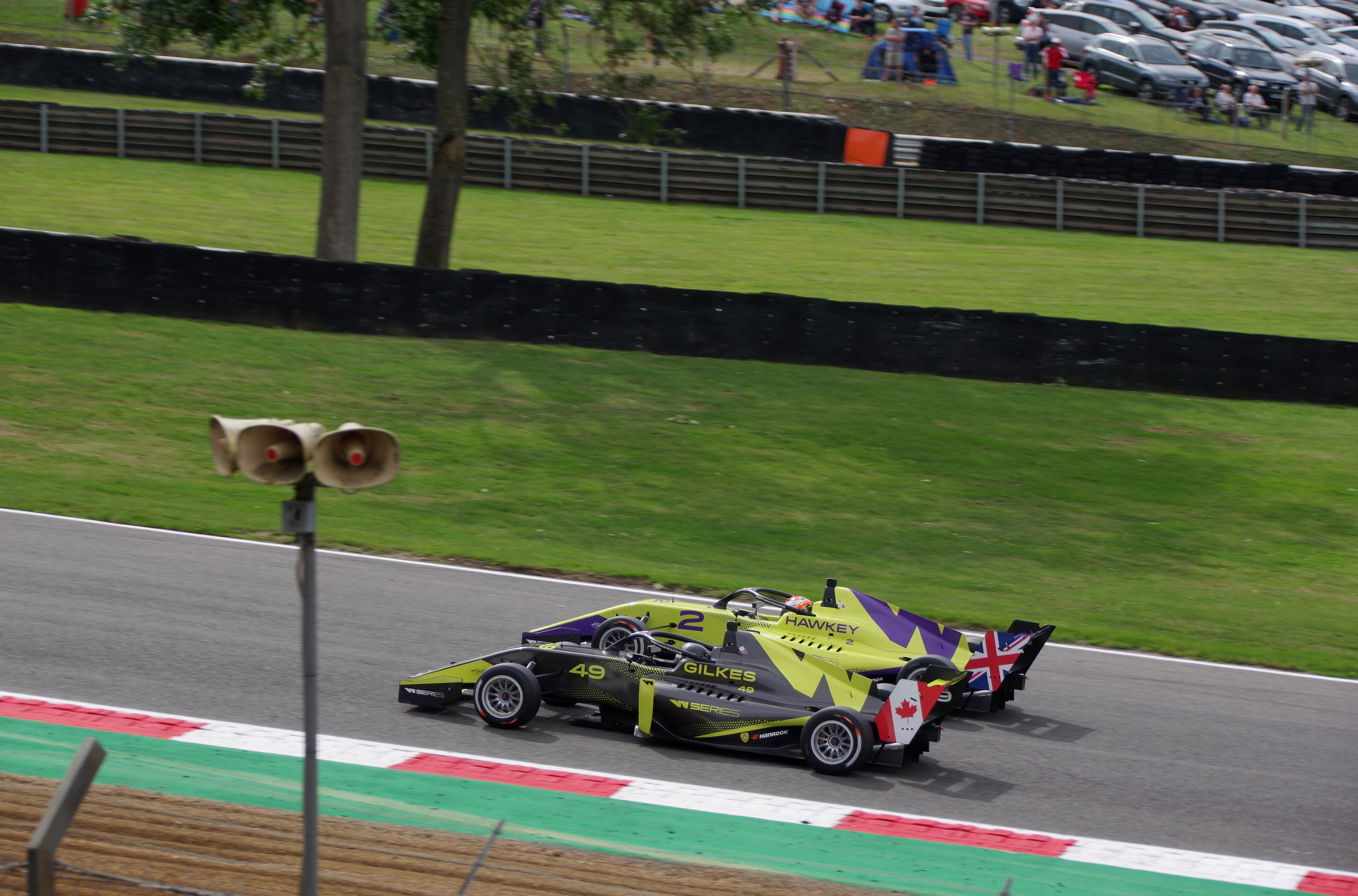
Hawkey battles Megan Gilkes at the 2019 W Series Brands Hatch round.

== Biography ==
Inspired by her father, Hawkey began racing karts at the age of ten. She had previously attended ballet and tap dancing classes, but chose to leave both in order to pursue a career in motorsport. Hawkey moved up to the Ginetta Junior Championship in 2014. Her first season would consist of a part-time schedule as a result of external commitments, and would score a best result of two 15th places in the six races she contested. She would stay in the Ginettas for 2015, switching to the JHR Developments team, however would be one of only two regular drivers (out of 25) who would fail to score a top-ten all season.

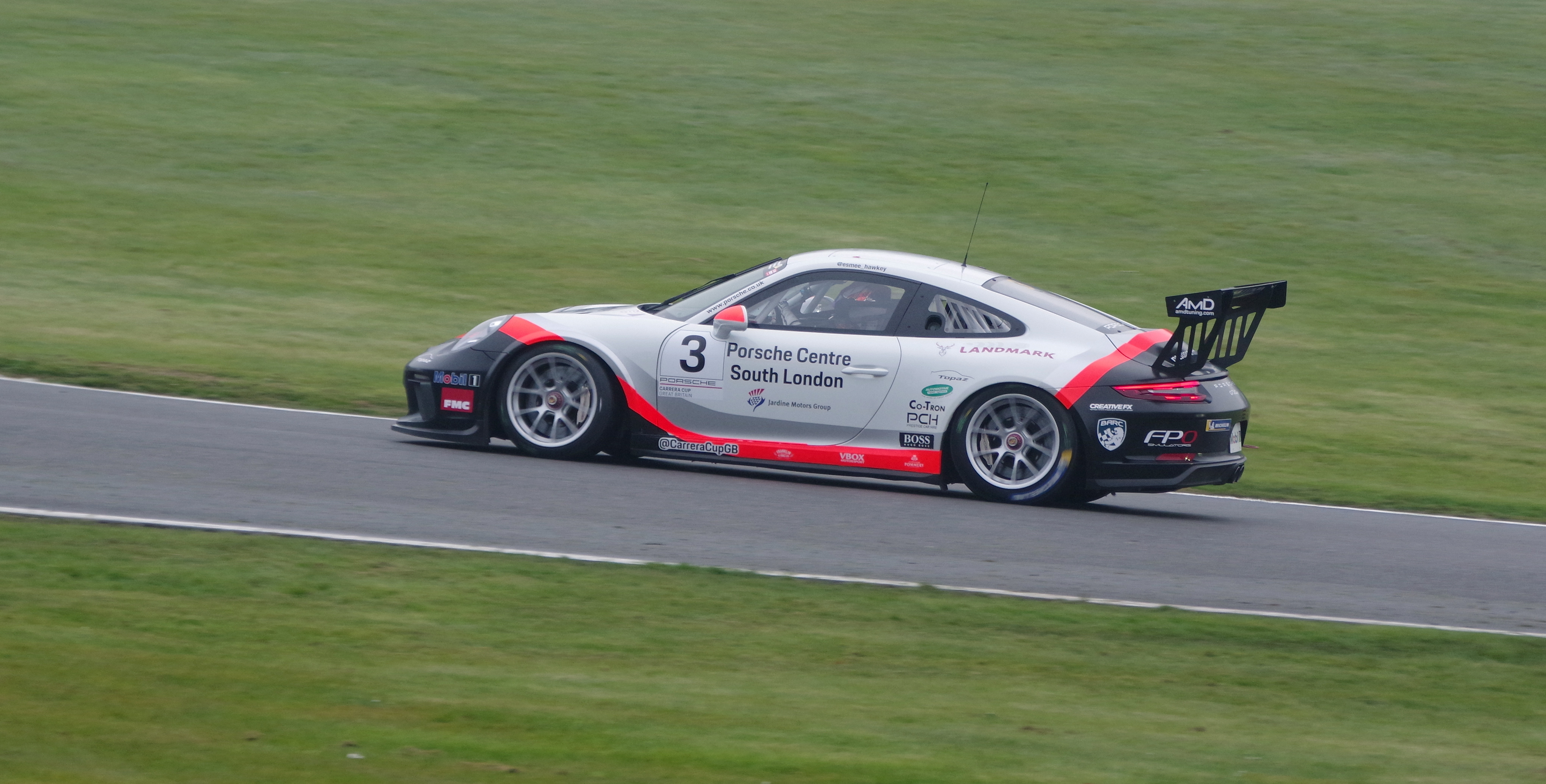
Hawkey driving at Brands Hatch in 2019.

Hawkey would become a Porsche junior driver in 2016, and would race a Cayman in the GT4 Class of the UK GT Cup for the next two seasons, with a best championship position of 2nd in 2016. Her GT Marques team would promote her to their Porsche Carrera Cup program in 2018, placing her in the Pro-Am class. She would finish the season 5th in class with two podiums, and would be retained for 2019. Hawkey has had a number of successful results in Porsche Carrera Cup and is the 2020 Pro-Am Champion.

Hawkey would be announced as one of the 18 permanent drivers for the inaugural season of the W Series. Hawkey would finish 12th in her maiden open-wheel race at Hockenheim having run in the points for a large portion of the race, but caused a collision with Gosia Rdest at Circuit Zolder that would take both drivers out of the race. The highlight of her campaign was a third place in qualifying at the final round in Brands Hatch, but she stalled on the grid and finished 16th – her only points of the season came in a race of attrition at the Norisring and left her 15th in the standings.

Having tested for British Touring Car Championship team MB Motorsport in early 2020, Hawkey returned to the Porsche Carrera Cup GB with Team Parker Racing, where she won the first 4 races straight in the Pro-Am class, finishing the season as champion. She signed with Iron Lynx Motorsport Lab to contest the 2021 European Le Mans Series in their Iron Dames GTE-spec Ferrari, but had her contract terminated before the first round due to incorrect license grading being provided to the FIA.

In 2021, Hawkey received backing from ROKiT and joined German racing team T3 Motorsport to drive a Lamborghini Huracán GT3 Evo full-time in the Deutsche Tourenwagen Masters, the leading Germany-based touring car racing series. After scoring two championship points in her first season in the Deutsche Tourenwagen Masters, she returned for a second season in 2022 with the same team and car but the team pulled out after two rounds due to a lack of funding.

Hawkey joined Ginetta as an ambassador in 2023, and was scheduled to contest the GT4 class of the 2023 British GT Championship. She only contested the opening two rounds of the season, with a best finish of 13th in class at Oulton Park.

After 2023, Hawkey appears to have moved away from motorsport and now hosts a podcast on business marketing.

== Personal life ==
Hawkey has a son, Leo, born in October 2024. She married Harry Fern in June 2025.

== Racing record ==
=== Career summary ===
Season	Series	Team	Races	Wins	Poles	F/Laps	Podiums	Points	Position
2014	Ginetta Junior Championship	AMD Motorsport	6	0	0	0	0	29	22nd
2015	Ginetta Junior Championship	JHR Developments	16	0	0	0	0	34	25th
2018	Porsche Carrera Cup GB - Pro Am	GT Marques	16	0	0	0	2	54	5th
2019	W Series	Hitech GP	6	0	0	0	0	2	15th
2019	Porsche Carrera Cup GB - Pro Am	GT Marques	16	3	0	0	12	110	**3rd**
2020	Porsche Carrera Cup GB - Pro Am	Team Parker Racing	16	9	0	0	15	156	**1st**
2021	Deutsche Tourenwagen Masters	T3 Motorsport	16	0	0	0	0	2	20th
2022	Deutsche Tourenwagen Masters	T3 Motorsport	4	0	0	0	0	0	33rd
2023	British GT Championship - GT4	Toro Verde GT	4	0	0	0	0	0	NC

=== Complete Ginetta Junior Championship results ===
(key) (Races in bold indicate pole position in class) (Races in italics indicate fastest lap in class)

Year	Team	1	2	3	4	5	6	7	8	9	10	11	12	13	14	15	16	17	18	19	20	Pos	Pts
2014	AMD Motorsport	BHI; 1	BHI; 2	DON; 1	DON; 2	THR; 1	THR; 2	OUL; 1	OUL; 2	CRO; 1	CRO; 2	SNE; 1	SNE; 2	KNO; 1	KNO; 2	ROC; 1; 15	ROC; 2; 16	SIL; 1; 16	SIL; 2; 16	BHGP; 1; 19	BHGP; 2; 15	22nd	29
2015	JHR Developments	BHI; 1; 22	BHI; 2 Ret	DON; 1; 18	DON; 2; 22	THR; 1; 19	THR; 2 Ret	OUL; 1; 14	OUL; 2; 14	CRO; 1	CRO; 2	SNE; 1 Ret	SNE; 2; 17	KNO; 1	KNO; 2	ROC; 1; 21	ROC; 2; 18	SIL; 1; 18	SIL; 2; 22	BHGP; 1; 19	BHGP; 2 Ret	25th	34

=== Complete W Series results ===
(key) (Races in bold indicate pole position) (Races in italics indicate fastest lap)

Year	Team	1	2	3	4	5	6	DC	Points
2019	Hitech GP	HOC; 12	ZOL; Ret	MIS; 11	NOR; 9	ASS; 11	BRH; 16	15th	2

=== Complete Deutsche Tourenwagen Masters results ===
(key) (Races in bold indicate pole position) (Races in italics indicate fastest lap)

Year	Team	Car	1	2	3	4	5	6	7	8	9	10	11	12	13	14	15	16	Pos	Points
2021	T3 Motorsport	Lamborghini Huracán GT3 Evo	MNZ; 1; 14	MNZ; 2; 16	LAU; 1 Ret	LAU; 2; 16	ZOL; 1; 13	ZOL; 2; 13	NÜR; 1; 17	NÜR; 2; 11	RBR; 1; 16	RBR; 2; 16	ASS; 1; 11	ASS; 2 Ret	HOC; 1; 14	HOC; 2; 16	NOR; 1 Ret	NOR; 2 Ret	20th	2
2022	T3 Motorsport	Lamborghini Huracán GT3 Evo	ALG; 1 Ret	ALG; 2; 21	LAU; 1; 18	LAU; 2; 19	IMO; 1	IMO; 2	NOR; 1	NOR; 2	NÜR; 1	NÜR; 2	SPA; 1	SPA; 2	RBR; 1	RBR; 2	HOC; 1	HOC; 2	33rd	0

=== Complete British GT Championship results ===
(key) (Races in bold indicate pole position) (Races in italics indicate fastest lap)

Year	Team	Car	Class	1	2	3	4	5	6	7	8	9	DC	Points
2023	Toro Verde GT	Ginetta G56 GT4	GT4	OUL; 1; 31	OUL; 2; 30	SIL; 1 Ret	DON; 1 Ret	SNE; 1	SNE; 2	ALG; 1	BRH; 1	DON; 1	NC	0

Sporting positions
Preceded by Karl Leonard	Porsche Carrera Cup GB; Pro-Am Champion; 2020	Succeeded by Ryan Ratcliffe
