= 2019 Norisring W Series round =

2019 Nuremberg W Series Round
- Race 4 of 6 of the 2019 W Series

Race details
- Date: 6 July 2019
- Official name: 2019 W Series Nuremberg round
- Location: Norisring, Nuremberg, Bavaria, Germany
- Course: Temporary street circuit
- Course length: 2.300 km (1.429 miles)
- Distance: 36 laps, 82.800 km (51.429 miles)

Pole position
- Driver: (Spain) Marta García
- Time: 50.712

Fastest lap
- Driver: (Finland) Emma Kimiläinen
- Time: 50.975

Podium
- First: (Spain) Marta García
- Second: (Netherlands) Beitske Visser
- Third: (United Kingdom) Jamie Chadwick

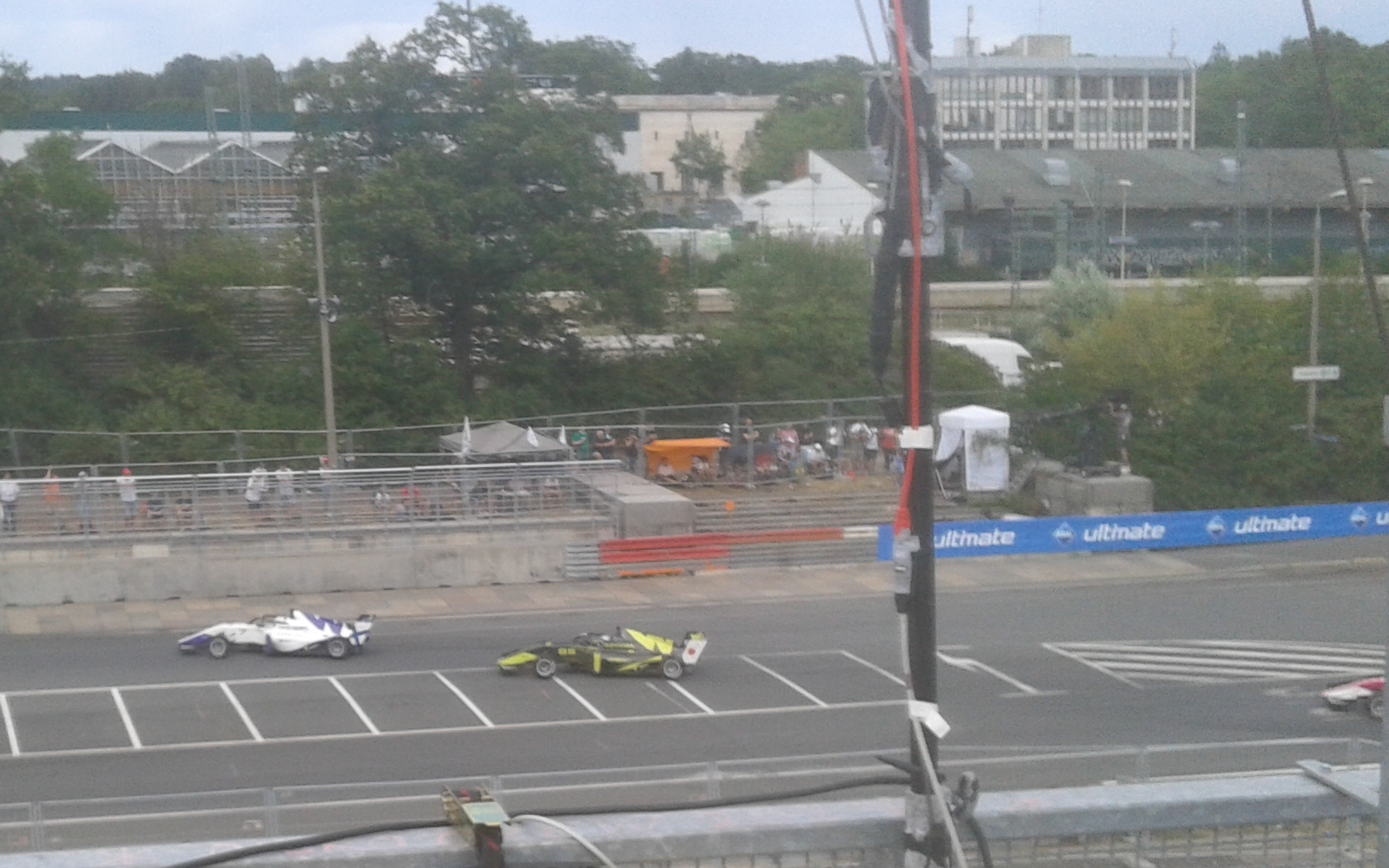
Saturday race

The 2019 W Series Nuremberg round (also commercially referred to as #WRace4) was the fourth round of the 2019 W Series, and took place at the Norisring in Germany on 6 July 2019. The event was an undercard to the 2019 Deutsche Tourenwagen Masters round at the same circuit.

== Report ==
=== Background ===
Following her win in the previous round, Jamie Chadwick enters the round on 68 points – 13 ahead of second-placed Beitske Visser. Marta García sits third in the championship, 20 points behind Visser.

Emma Kimiläinen will return to the series for the first time since practice at the Zolder round of the championship following an injury-induced break.

=== Practice ===
FP1 would see all twenty cars take to the track, although Sabré Cook's running would be delayed due to technical issues. The session was marred by a crash at the Grundig hairpin between Alice Powell and Esmee Hawkey, which would see Powell taken to hospital with wrist pain. Misano pole-sitter Fabienne Wohlwend would set the benchmark in the opening session, beating championship leader Jamie Chadwick by a tenth of a second.

Only nineteen cars would take to the track in FP2, as the damage sustained to Hawkeys' car could not be repaired in time. This session would also be red flagged, with Miki Koyama plucking the rear wing off her car at the Schöller S. Wohlwend held the fastest time for the majority of the session however a last minute flurry of times put Gosia Rdest at the top, ahead of Beitske Visser and Wohlwend. All drivers would be within a second of the fastest time, with both sessions led by drivers with circuit experience having raced in the Audi Sport TT Cup previously.

Following practice, W Series management announced that the field would remain set at 18 cars. It was subsequently announced that Vivien Keszthelyi would be promoted to main driver and Megan Gilkes would be demoted to reserve driver, with neither Gilkes nor Sarah Bovy allowed to compete.

=== Qualifying ===
Qualifying started earlier than normal at 8:50am local time. The session began in a non-descript fashion, before Jessica Hawkins set down a surprise yardstick with a low 51-second laptime at the halfway mark. With seven minutes remaining, Alice Powell would stop her car on the entry to the Schöller S with a gearbox failure, and having already sat out most of the session with technical issues would start from the back of the grid. Upon the resumption of the session, Keszthelyi would have a spin at the Dutzendteich Kehre, before Marta García knocked Hawkins off the top spot. Hawkins would eventually fall to sixth and would be unable to set a better time as Shea Holbrook would suffer broken suspension at the Grundig Kehre with a minute remaining, bringing out the yellow flags and effectively ending the session. García would score her first pole position in the W Series, ahead of Chadwick, Wohlwend, Rdest and Visser – the top six cars covered by less than a quarter of a second.

=== Race ===
Marta García would get the jump following a very quick light sequence. Beitske Visser would make the best start from 5th on the grid to dive down the inside of Chadwick at turn one. Wohlwend would be caught on the outside of the opening hairpin, and as she slowed to avoid hitting the barrier Rdest bumped into the Liechtensteiner's rear-left wheel, dislodging the Pole's front wing. There were no incidents in the opening lap, however Sarah Moore would lock up into the Grundig Kehre on lap 4 and spin into Shea Holbrook, catching out Keszthelyi and the slow-starting Caitlin Wood. Moore would suffer from suspension failure the following lap and parked her car behind the barrier at Dutzendteich, whilst Holbrook was forced to pit with a puncture.

As the race wore on, García built a healthy lead over Visser, with Chadwick in striking distance. Wohlwend began to drop off the back of Chadwick, however Rdest was keeping pace with Hawkins in the battle for fifth which disallowed the pair to make ground. Rdest was then given a mechanical black flag for the broken wing, before both she and Holbrook were handed drive-through penalties for pit lane speeding - dropping both drivers a lap down. Hawkins' pace struggles were on full display as she locked up and ran wide, with Kimiläinen overtaking her for fifth and chased after the leaders.

A quiet race would turn dramatic in the closing laps, as a battle for second between the championship contenders as well as a battle for fourth between Wohlwend and Kimiläinen would commence. With a handful of laps remaining, Hawkins slowed dramatically and pitted with a spark plug failure, with Alice Powell suffering a similar fate behind her having the fuel pump break after running as high as ninth from last on the grid. García took a dominant win followed by Visser, who survived a last-lap lunge from Chadwick which would see the Briton finish third, with Wohlwend maintaining fourth ahead of Kimiläinen who was stuck in fifth as a lack of straight-line speed would see her unable to take advantage of the slipstream. Miki Koyama finished in sixth and twelve seconds behind the top five, followed by Cook in seventh and Tasmin Pepper in eighth. Hawkey would score her first points of the season in ninth and Naomi Schiff finished tenth having benefitted from a time penalty for Vittoria Piria.

== Classification ==
=== Practice ===
Session	No.	Driver	Time	Condts
Practice 1	5	(Liechtenstein) Fabienne Wohlwend	51.728	Dry
Practice 2	3	(Poland) Gosia Rdest	50.983	Dry

=== Qualifying ===
Pos.	No.	Driver	Time/Gap	Grid
1	19	(Spain) Marta García	50.712	1
2	55	(United Kingdom) Jamie Chadwick	+0.081	2
3	5	(Liechtenstein) Fabienne Wohlwend	+0.209	3
4	3	(Poland) Gosia Rdest	+0.212	4
5	95	(Netherlands) Beitske Visser	+0.223	5
6	21	(United Kingdom) Jessica Hawkins	+0.233	6
7	11	(Italy) Vittoria Piria	+0.312	7
8	7	(Finland) Emma Kimiläinen	+0.432	8
9	85	(Japan) Miki Koyama	+0.450	9
10	37	(United States) Sabré Cook	+0.491	10
11	31	(South Africa) Tasmin Pepper	+0.737	11
12	26	(United Kingdom) Sarah Moore	+0.777	12
13	20	(Australia) Caitlin Wood	+0.788	13
14	67	(United States) Shea Holbrook	+0.804	14
15	2	(United Kingdom) Esmee Hawkey	+0.826	15
16	99	(Germany) Naomi Schiff	+0.878	16
17	77	(Hungary) Vivien Keszthelyi	+0.942	17
18	27	(United Kingdom) Alice Powell	+4.355	18

=== Race ===
Pos.	No.	Driver	Laps	Time/Retired	Grid	Pts
1	19	(Spain) Marta García	36	30:59.755	1	25
2	95	(Netherlands) Beitske Visser	36	+3.619	5	18
3	55	(United Kingdom) Jamie Chadwick	36	+4.041	2	15
4	5	(Liechtenstein) Fabienne Wohlwend	36	+6.176	3	12
5	7	(Finland) Emma Kimiläinen	36	+6.592	8	10
6	85	(Japan) Miki Koyama	36	+18.300	9	8
7	37	(United States) Sabré Cook	36	+20.029	10	6
8	31	(South Africa) Tasmin Pepper	36	+25.735	11	4
9	2	(United Kingdom) Esmee Hawkey	36	+38.281	15	2
10	99	(Germany) Naomi Schiff	36	+41.466	16	1
11	20	(Australia) Caitlin Wood	36	+42.443	13	
12	11	(Italy) Vittoria Piria	36	+44.538^{1}	7	
13	77	(Hungary) Vivien Keszthelyi	35	+1 lap	17	
14	3	(Poland) Gosia Rdest	35	+1 lap	4	
15	67	(United States) Shea Holbrook	33	+3 laps	14	
Ret	21	(United Kingdom) Jessica Hawkins	31	Mechanical	6	
Ret	27	(United Kingdom) Alice Powell	31	Mechanical	18	
Ret	26	(United Kingdom) Sarah Moore	4	Crash damage	12	
Fastest lap set by Emma Kimiläinen: 50.975

- ^1 – Piria would receive a ten-second time penalty for a jump-start.

== Championship standings ==
+/-	Pos.	Driver	Pts	Gap
	1	(United Kingdom) Jamie Chadwick	83	
	2	(Netherlands) Beitske Visser	73	-10
	3	(Spain) Marta García	60	-23
1	4	(Liechtenstein) Fabienne Wohlwend	41	-42
1	5	(United Kingdom) Alice Powell	33	-50

== See also ==
- 2019 DTM Nuremberg round

Previous race: 2019 W Series Misano round	W Series; 2019 season	Next race: 2019 W Series Assen round
