= Naomi Schiff =

Belgian-Rwandan racing driver (born 1994)

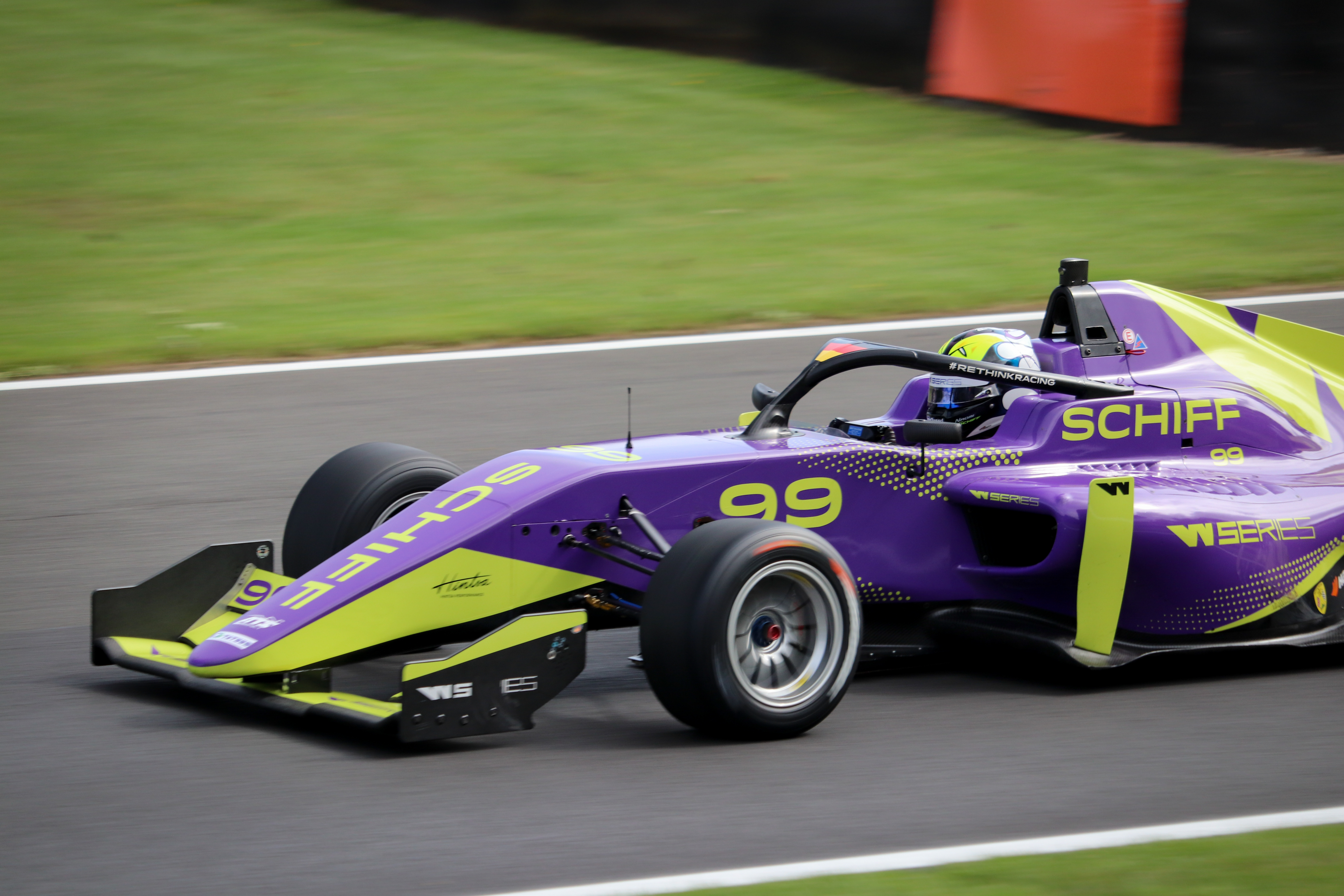
- Nationality: (Rwanda) Rwandan (Belgium) Belgian via dual nationality
- Born: 18 May 1994 (age 32) Antwerp, Belgium

Previous series
- 2010 2014 2015 2019: Southern African Formula Volkswagen; Clio Cup China Series; KTM X-Bow GT4; W Series

Naomi Schiff-Dedieu (née Schiff; born 18 May 1994) is a Rwandan and Belgian racing driver and television presenter. She was born in Belgium, to a Belgian father and Rwandan mother, grew up in South Africa, and now lives in Paris, France.

In 2020, Schiff was appointed as the diversity and inclusion ambassador for the W Series, and in 2022 she became a presenter for Sky Sports.

== Career ==
Schiff began her career in single-seater racing cars in 2010, as a 16-year-old driving in the South African Formula Volkswagen Championship. She finished that season in 17th place with seven points. In 2011, she took part in four races in the Bridgestone Special Open trophy. She drove for the CK Racing team but was not classified.

After a break from racing in 2013, Schiff competed in round 1 of the Eurocup Formula Renault 2.0 at Ciudad del Motor de Aragón for the RC Formula race team. Similarly, she appeared at the start of Supercar Challenge Superlights - SR3 in GH Motorsport team.

Schiff won the 2014 Clio Cup China Series with 135 points. That same year she also competed in the 24 Hours of Zolder. In 2017, she raced the KTM X-Bow GT4 in several rounds of the GT4 European Series Northern Cup, her best result being sixth in class (12th overall) in the second race of round 4 at the Slovakia Ring.

In 2018, Schiff competed in the 24 Hours of Nürburgring, finishing 2nd in class (39th overall).

In February 2022, Schiff presented the Mercedes AMG Petronas F1 Team car launch for the Mercedes W13 alongside Natalie Pinkham. The following month, she was announced as co-presenter on a new Sky Sports F1 show Any Driven Monday and has been part of Sky Sports F1 team since 2022. She has been a co-presenter on the Canal + F1 team since the 2023 Hungarian Grand Prix. From 2026, she has co-hosted the Up to Speed podcast with David Coulthard, Will Buxton and Jolie Sharpe.

== Personal life ==
Schiff married Alexandre Dedieu in September 2024. The couple have a son, Raphaël, born in October 2025.

== Racing record ==
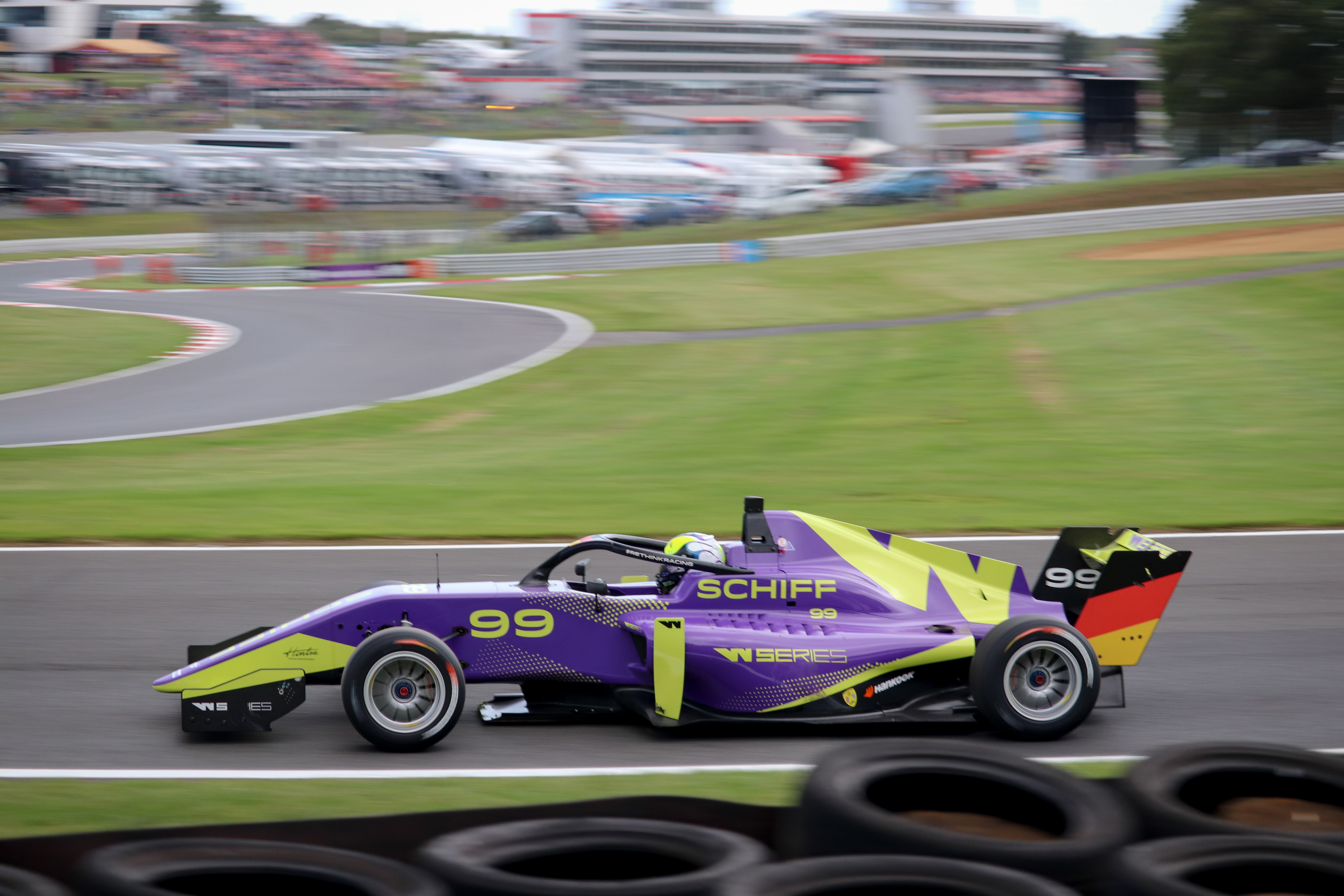
Schiff at the 2019 W Series Brands Hatch round

=== Career summary ===
Season	Series	Team	Races	Wins	Poles	F/Laps	Podiums	Points	Position
2010	Formula Volkswagen South Africa Championship	Terry Moss Racing	6	0	0	0	0	7	17th
2013	Asian Formula Renault Series	FRD Racing Team	2	0	0	0	0	24	11th
2013	Ferrari Challenge Asia-Pacific	N/A	2	0	0	0	0	2	14th
2013	Clio Cup China Series	N/A	4	2	3	3	3	98	7th
2013	Supercar Challenge - SR3	GH Motorsport	2	0	0	0	0	20	11th
2013	Eurocup Formula Renault 2.0	RC Formula	1	0	0	0	0	0	36th
2014	Clio Cup China Series	N/A	10	7	7	8	9	318	**1st**
2014	24 Hours of Zolder - Class 2	Team Shadow-Leplan GT	1	0	0	0	1	N/A	**2nd**
2014	Supercar Challenge - SR3	Radical Benelux	1	1	0	0	1	0	NC†
2015	Blancpain GT Sports Club	Reiter Engineering	2	0	0	0	0	10	11th
2016	GT4 European Series - Pro	RYS Team KISKA	2	0	0	0	0	0	33rd
2016	24H Series - SP3	RTR Projects							
2017	GT4 European Series Northern Cup	RYS Team WP	8	0	0	0	0	14	28th
2017	24H Series - SP3-GT4	Reiter Engineering	1	0	0	0	0	0	16th
2018	24H GT Series - SPX	True Racing	1	0	0	0	1	0	NC†
2018	24 Hours of Nürburgring - Cup X	True Racing	1	0	0	0	1	N/A	**2nd**
2019	W Series	Hitech GP	6	0	0	0	0	2	16th
2021	W Series	Reserve driver							

† Guest driver ineligible to score points

=== Complete Eurocup Formula Renault 2.0 results ===
(key) (Races in bold indicate pole position; races in italics indicate fastest lap)

Year	Entrant	1	2	3	4	5	6	7	8	9	10	11	12	13	14	DC	Points
2013	RC Formula	ALC; 1; 34	ALC; 2 DNS	SPA; 1	SPA; 2	MSC; 1	MSC; 2	RBR; 1	RBR; 2	HUN; 1	HUN; 2	LEC; 1	LEC; 2	CAT; 1	CAT; 2	36th	0

=== Complete W Series results ===
(key) (Races in bold indicate pole position) (Races in italics indicate fastest lap)

Year	Team	1	2	3	4	5	6	DC	Points
2019	Hitech GP	HOC; 14	ZOL; 10	MIS; 18	NOR; 10	ASS; 12	BRH; 15	16th	2
