= 2019 W Series =

2019 women's-only Racing Event

The 2019 W Series was the inaugural motor racing season of the W Series, an all-female Formula Regional-level racing series.

== Calendar ==
A single championship race was held at six rounds of the Deutsche Tourenwagen Masters, with an additional non-championship race at TT Circuit Assen to test different event formats.

Round	Circuit	Date	Map
1	(Germany) Hockenheimring, Hockenheim	May 4	2019 W Series is located in Europe
2	(Belgium) Circuit Zolder, Heusden-Zolder	May 18	2019 W Series is located in Europe
3	(Italy) Misano World Circuit, Misano Adriatico	June 8	2019 W Series is located in Europe
4	(Germany) Norisring, Nuremberg	July 6	2019 W Series is located in Europe
5	(Netherlands) TT Circuit Assen, Assen	July 20–21	2019 W Series is located in Europe
6	(United Kingdom) Brands Hatch, West Kingsdown	August 11	2019 W Series is located in Europe

== Driver selection ==
55 drivers were initially entered in a qualifying longlist for the 2019 season, with a further six added later on. An evaluation was held at the Wachauring in Melk, Austria over 26–28 January, with series judges—including David Coulthard, Alexander Wurz and Lyn St. James— selecting a shortlist of drivers that would get to test the Tatuus–Alfa Romeo T-318. Drivers completed 10 'modules' that tested their skills in racecraft, fitness, media training and sponsorship pitches, before a final knockout series of races that would decide the 28 drivers that advanced to the next stage at the Circuito de Almería in Almería, Spain. The final stage held over 22–27 March, which saw additional fitness testing and data analysis alongside traditional testing, would decide the 18-driver line-up as well as four additional substitute drivers who would be on standby in the event of a regular driver's absence.

The evaluation format, based on the FIA Institute Young Driver Excellence Academy programme, drew mixed opinions from the competitors. Eliminated driver Charlotte Poynting labelled the process "confusing" and that the judges "obviously weren't looking for the fastest drivers", whereas compatriot Caitlin Wood claimed the evaluation was "as fair as they could make it".

=== Eliminated drivers ===
Withdrew before evaluation

- (United Arab Emirates) Amna Al Qubaisi
- (Denmark) Michelle Gatting
- (Germany) Angelique Germann
- (Germany) Michelle Halder
- (Spain) Carmen Jordá
- (United States) Sheena Monk
- (Germany) Carrie Schreiner

Eliminated after evaluation

- (Norway) Ayla Ågren
- (Australia) Chelsea Angelo
- (Spain) Carmen Boix
- (United States) Toni Breidinger
- (Italy) Alessandra Brena
- (South Africa) Ivana Cetinich
- (Czech Republic) Veronika Cichá
- (United States) Courtney Crone
- (India) Mira Erda
- (Italy) Carlotta Fedeli
- (United States) Cassie Gannis
- (Venezuela) Samin Gómez
- (South Africa) Fabienne Lanz
- (Finland) Milla Mäkelä
- (Romania) Alexandra Marinescu
- (Switzerland) Marylin Niederhauser
- (Kazakhstan) Lyubov Ozeretskovskaya
- (Canada) Taegen Poles
- (Australia) Charlotte Poynting
- (Switzerland) Sharon Scolari
- (Germany) Doreen Seidel
- (Malaysia) Siti Shahkirah
- (India) Sneha Sharma
- (France) Inès Taittinger
- (Brazil) Bruna Tomaselli
- (United States) Hanna Zellers

Eliminated after testing

- (United States) Natalie Decker
- (China) Grace Gui
- (Poland) Natalia Kowalska
- (Netherlands) Stéphane Kox
- (Italy) Francesca Linossi
- (Netherlands) Milou Mets
- (Netherlands) Shirley van der Lof
- (Australia) Alexandra Whitley

=== Qualified drivers ===
All drivers competed with the Tatuus–Alfa Romeo F3 T-318 operated by Hitech GP and fitted with Hankook tires.

No.	Drivers	Status	Rounds
2	(United Kingdom) Esmee Hawkey		All
3	(Poland) Gosia Rdest		All
5	(Liechtenstein) Fabienne Wohlwend		All
7	(Finland) Emma Kimiläinen		1–2, 4–6
11	(Italy) Vicky Piria		All
19	(Spain) Marta García		All
20	(Australia) Caitlin Wood		All
21	(United Kingdom) Jessica Hawkins		All
26	(United Kingdom) Sarah Moore		All
27	(United Kingdom) Alice Powell		All
31	(South Africa) Tasmin Pepper		All
37	(United States) Sabré Cook		All
49	(Canada) Megan Gilkes	R^{1}	1–3, 5–6
55	(United Kingdom) Jamie Chadwick		All
58	(Belgium) Sarah Bovy	R	2–3, 6
67	(United States) Shea Holbrook		All
77	(Hungary) Vivien Keszthelyi	R^{1}	2–4, 6
85	(Japan) Miki Koyama		All
95	(Netherlands) Beitske Visser (Note: Represented by the flag of Friesland on the podium during the Brands Hatch round.)		All
99	(Germany) Naomi Schiff (Note: Schiff is a Rwandan-Belgian driver who competed under a German racing licence.)		All

Icon	Class
R	Reserve driver

^1 – Megan Gilkes, normally a regular driver, was demoted to reserve driver duties at Round 4. Vivien Keszthelyi, normally a reserve driver, was promoted to regular driver duties at Round 4.

== Season summary ==
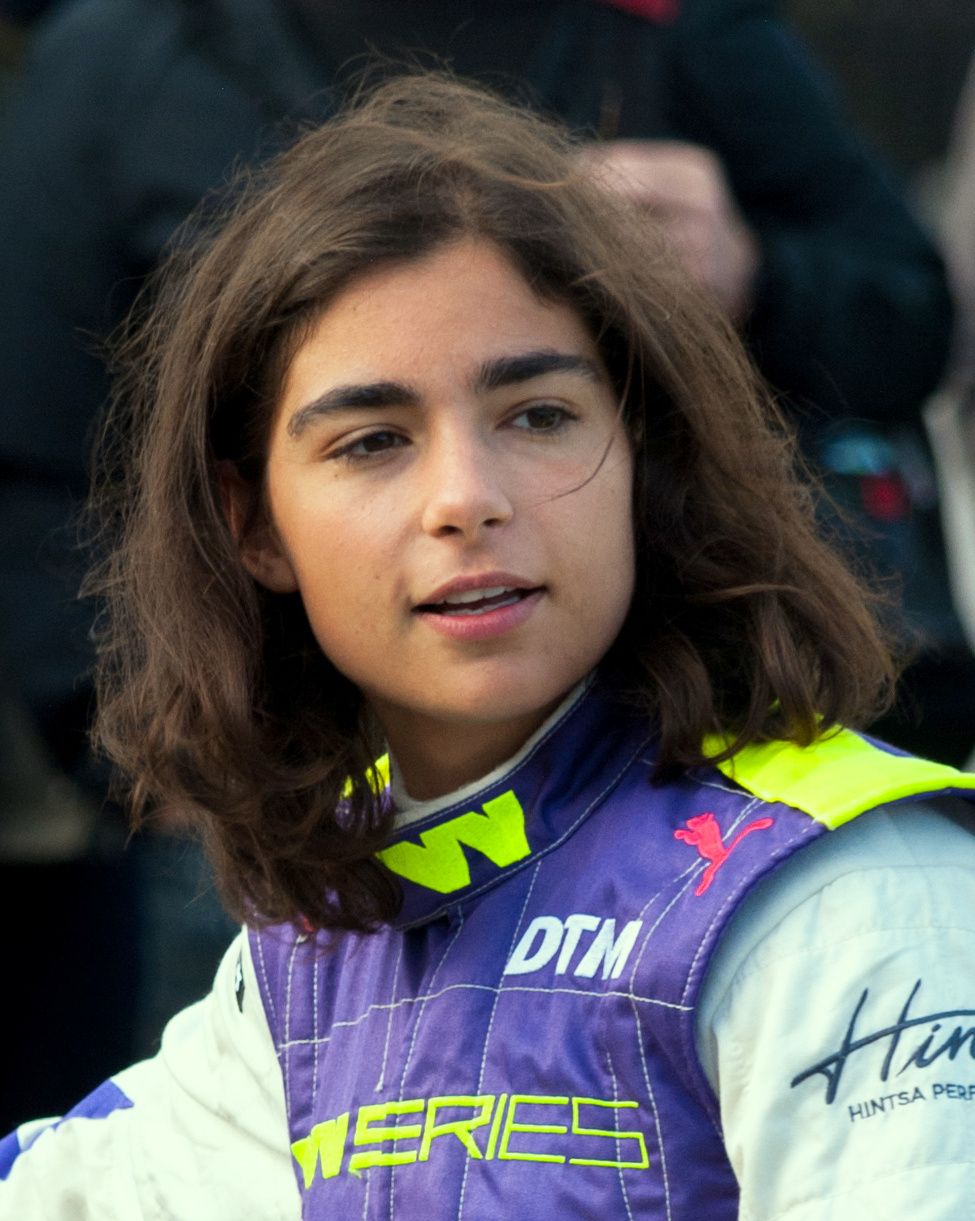
Jamie Chadwick, the 2019 drivers' champion.

Championship favourite Jamie Chadwick dominated proceedings at the series' first event at the Hockenheimring, topping both practice sessions, qualifying on pole position and winning the single race – however she did briefly lose the lead to Alice Powell during a safety car period. Said safety car was deployed for an incident between Emma Kimiläinen and Megan Gilkes; Kimiläinen stalled from fourth on the grid and was then crashed into by Gilkes at the hairpin later in the lap. Powell and Marta García completed the podium, with García and Miki Koyama (who drove from 17th to 7th) receiving industry praise for their performances.

Kimiläinen was withdrawn from the second round at Zolder due to a neck injury, and was replaced with both reserve drivers – Sarah Bovy and Vivien Keszthelyi. Neither driver finished the race; local driver Bovy suffered an engine failure on the grid, whilst Keszthelyi was spun into the wall by Sabré Cook whilst trying to avoid an incident between Gosia Rdest and Esmee Hawkey. Beitske Visser jumped Chadwick at the start and won the race despite two safety car periods and having briefly removed her steering wheel on the grid, with Chadwick holding off a fast-finishing Powell for third.

Fabienne Wohlwend qualified on pole position at the third round in Misano, but a slow start resulted in a first-corner collision with Alice Powell that sent the Briton airborne and out of the race. Aside from a half-spin for Naomi Schiff, the rest of the race was uneventful and Wohlwend trailed home Visser and race-winner Chadwick.

Powell's championship hopes took another nosedive at the fourth round in Nuremberg, starting at the back due to a broken gearbox in qualifying and failing to finish with a fuel-pump issues. García claimed a lights-to-flag win ahead of Visser and Chadwick, with Wohlwend holding off the returning Kimiläinen for fourth. Gosia Rdest showed promise having topped a practice session and qualified fourth, but finished a lap down after breaking her front wing on the opening lap.

Kimiläinen claimed the series first 'grand slam' with pole position, the fastest lap and race win at the fifth round in Assen. Powell jumped the Finn off the line and was aided by a safety car for an incident between Koyama and Tasmin Pepper, but Kimiläinen retook the lead with ten minutes remaining. Wohlwend's slim title hopes were dashed when she hit the back of Rdest and broke her front wing; Caitlin Wood, Rdest and Jessica Hawkins claiming their best results of the season in fifth, sixth and seventh respectively. A non-championship race was held the following day, with the grid based on reversed championship standings – Megan Gilkes beat Powell by 0.003secs in an incident-filled heat.

Chadwick and Visser entered the finale at Brands Hatch as the only championship contenders, with Chadwick only needing a podium to seal the title. Having led the early running from pole, Chadwick was bullied out of the lead by Powell and Kimiläinen. A spin for Koyama resulted in a late-race safety car, and on the restart Visser made a bold pass on Chadwick for third at Dingle Dell – but with Visser unable to make further progress and Chadwick holding off Wohlwend for fourth, the Brit won the first W Series championship by 10 points.

== Results and standings ==
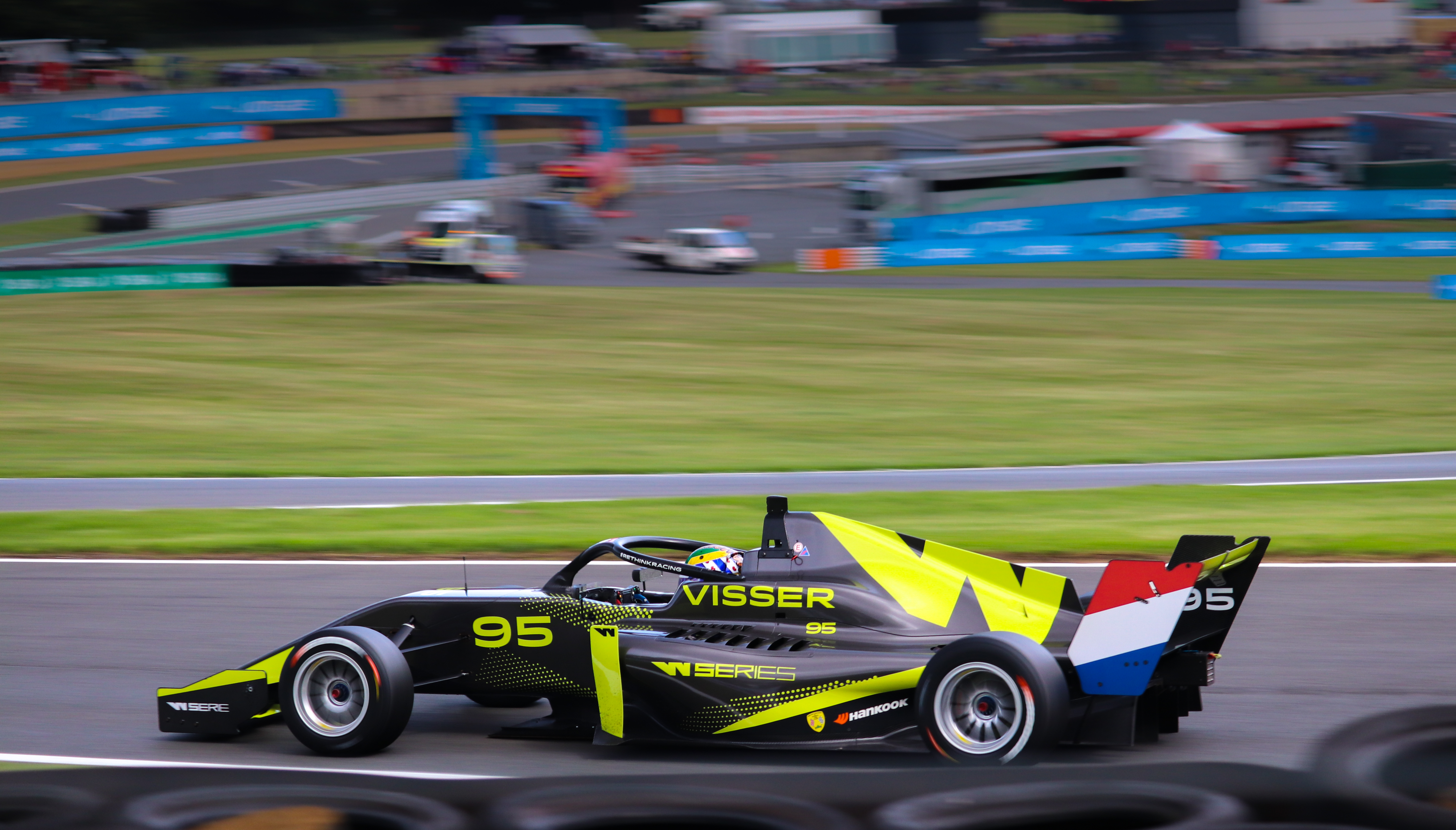
Beitske Visser scored four podiums including a race win.

=== Results summary ===
Round	Circuit	Pole position	Fastest lap	Race winner	Report
1	Hockenheim	(United Kingdom) Jamie Chadwick	(Japan) Miki Koyama	(United Kingdom) Jamie Chadwick	Report
2	Zolder	(United Kingdom) Jamie Chadwick	(Netherlands) Beitske Visser	(Netherlands) Beitske Visser	Report
3	Misano	(Liechtenstein) Fabienne Wohlwend	(Netherlands) Beitske Visser	(United Kingdom) Jamie Chadwick	Report
4	Nuremberg	(Spain) Marta García	(Finland) Emma Kimiläinen	(Spain) Marta García	Report
5	Assen	(Finland) Emma Kimiläinen	(Finland) Emma Kimiläinen	(Finland) Emma Kimiläinen	Report
NC	Assen		(United States) Sabré Cook	(Canada) Megan Gilkes	Report
6	Brands Hatch	(United Kingdom) Jamie Chadwick	(Finland) Emma Kimiläinen	(United Kingdom) Alice Powell	Report

=== Championship standings ===
==== Scoring system ====
Points were awarded to the top ten classified finishers as follows:

Race Position	**1st**	**2nd**	**3rd**	**4th**	**5th**	**6th**	**7th**	**8th**	**9th**	**10th**
Points	25	18	15	12	10	8	6	4	2	1

==== Drivers' Championship ====
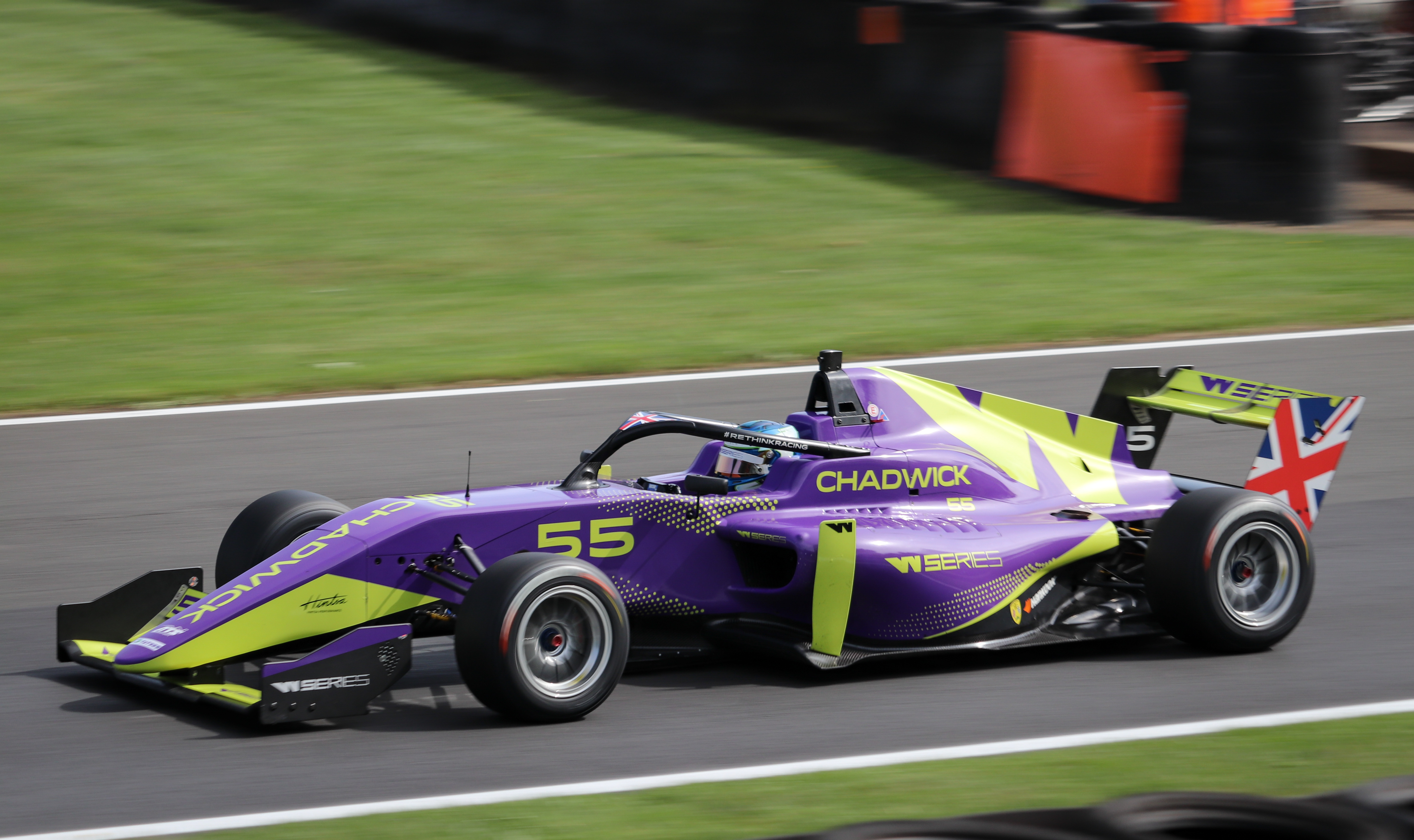
Jamie Chadwick was champion in the inaugural season.

Pos.	Driver	HOC (Germany)	ZOL (Belgium)	MIS (Italy)	NOR (Germany)	ASS (Netherlands)	BRH (United Kingdom)	Points
1	(United Kingdom) Jamie Chadwick	**1**	**2**	1	3	3	**4**	110
2	(Netherlands) Beitske Visser	4	1	2	2	4	3	100
3	(United Kingdom) Alice Powell	2	3	Ret	Ret	2	1	76
4	(Spain) Marta García	3	4	6	**1**	9	8	66
5	(Finland) Emma Kimiläinen	Ret	WD		5	**1**	2	53
6	(Liechtenstein) Fabienne Wohlwend	6	7	**3**	4	15	5	51
7	(Japan) Miki Koyama	7	8	4	6	Ret	20	30
8	(United Kingdom) Sarah Moore	5	5	9	Ret	10	10	24
9	(Italy) Vicky Piria	15	9	5	12	8	6	24
10	(South Africa) Tasmin Pepper	8	6	7	8	Ret	12	22
11	(United States) Sabré Cook	13	15	8	7	13	9	12
12	(United Kingdom) Jessica Hawkins	11	13	15	Ret	7	7	12
13	(Australia) Caitlin Wood	10	11	14	11	5	11	11
14	(Poland) Gosia Rdest	9	Ret	13	14	6	13	10
15	(United Kingdom) Esmee Hawkey	12	Ret	11	9	11	16	2
16	(Germany) Naomi Schiff	14	10	18	10	12	15	2
17	(Hungary) Vivien Keszthelyi		Ret	10	13		14	1
18	(United States) Shea Holbrook	16	12	16	15	16	17	0
19	(Canada) Megan Gilkes	Ret	14	17		14	18	0
20	(Belgium) Sarah Bovy		DNS	12			19	0
Pos.	Driver	HOC (Germany)	ZOL (Belgium)	MIS (Italy)	NOR (Germany)	ASS (Netherlands)	BRH (United Kingdom)	Points

Colour	Result
Gold	Winner
Silver	Second place
Bronze	Third place
Green	Points classification
Blue	Non-points classification
Blue	Non-classified finish (NC)
Purple	Retired, not classified (Ret)
Red	Did not qualify (DNQ)
Red	Did not pre-qualify (DNPQ)
Black	Disqualified (DSQ)
White	Did not start (DNS)
White	Withdrew (WD)
White	Race cancelled (C)
Blank	Did not practice (DNP)
Blank	Did not arrive (DNA)
Blank	Excluded (EX)

**Bold** – Pole
Italics – Fastest Lap
