= 2019 Misano W Series round =

2019 Misano W Series Round
- Race 3 of 6 of the 2019 W Series

Race details
- Date: 8 June 2019
- Official name: 2019 W Series Misano round
- Location: Misano World Circuit Marco Simoncelli, Misano Adriatico, Emilia-Romagna, Italy
- Course: Permanent circuit
- Course length: 4.226 km (2.626 miles)
- Distance: 20 laps, 84.520 km (52.520 miles)
- Weather: Sunny, 26°C (79°F)

Pole position
- Driver: (Liechtenstein) Fabienne Wohlwend
- Time: 1:33.283

Fastest lap
- Driver: (Netherlands) Beitske Visser
- Time: 1:34.613

Podium
- First: (United Kingdom) Jamie Chadwick
- Second: (Netherlands) Beitske Visser
- Third: (Liechtenstein) Fabienne Wohlwend

The 2019 W Series Misano round (also commercially referred to as #WRace3) was the third round of the 2019 W Series, and took place at the Misano World Circuit in Italy on 8 June 2019. The event was an undercard to the 2019 Deutsche Tourenwagen Masters round at the same circuit.

== Report ==
=== Background ===
Following a first and a second placing in the opening two races, Jamie Chadwick leads the series on 43 points – six points ahead of Zolder race winner Beitske Visser. Having scored podiums in both of the races so far, Alice Powell sits third in the standings some 10 points behind fellow Briton Chadwick.

Finnish driver Emma Kimiläinen will once again be ruled out of racing following her injury sustained in a crash at Hockenheim. Both reserve drivers Sarah Bovy and Vivien Keszthelyi will replace her.

=== Practice ===
Both practice sessions were held in hot, dry conditions. Free Practice One would be led by Beitske Visser, with Alice Powell just over a tenth behind her. Jessica Hawkins would be a surprise third with championship leader Chadwick down in 4th. The top 12 cars would be covered by less than a second, including reserve driver Vivien Keszthelyi.

Practice Two would be delayed by 50 minutes due to track maintenance. Japanese driver Miki Koyama would set the fastest time of the day with a 1:34.663, roughly 0.15sec ahead of Chadwick. Hawkins would continue the strong showing again in third, with local driver Vittoria Piria in fourth but only three-hundredths quicker than Visser – the top five covered by less than four-tenths of a second.

=== Qualifying ===
Qualifying began with Jamie Chadwick setting the pace, before quickly being deposed by Beitske Visser. Halfway through the session, Fabienne Wohlwend – one of the few drivers with circuit experience having won races at Misano in the Ferrari Challenge – skipped half a second clear. Caitlin Wood took too many liberties with the track limits soon after, breaking her suspension on a kerb. Sarah Bovy also had her fastest time deleted for not respecting track limits. Chadwick got within four-hundredths of the pole position, however Wohlwend had done enough to become only the second Liechtensteiner to sit on the pole position of an FIA-sanctioned open-wheel race, and first since Rikky von Opel at the Castle Combe round of the 1971 British Formula 3 Championship.

=== Race ===
Wohlwend made a terrible start from pole position, allowing Chadwick to move past on the run to turn one. Visser and Powell pulled alongside Wohlwend, however in Powell's attempts to push Wohlwend into giving up the place she ran out of road and made wheel-to-wheel contact with the Liechtensteiner, launching onto two wheels and coming to a rest in the gravel trap with broken front-left suspension, necessitating the deployment of the Safety Car.

At the restart, Chadwick led Visser and Wohlwend. The top three started to pull away from the battle for fourth between Vittoria Piria and Miki Koyama. Wohlwend began to search for a way past Visser, however ran wide at the final corner and lost a second on the Dutchwoman, allowing the #95 to pressure Chadwick. Around half-way through the race, Koyama passed Piria at the exit of Turn 8 as the local driver mis-shifted.

Further back, Sarah Moore formed a midfield train from eighth place back. Esmee Hawkey went wide exiting Turn 14 and dropped outside of the top ten, with Naomi Schiff the beneficiary. The joy would be short-lived for the German/Rwandan driver, who spun the car exiting Turn 5 and dropped down to last place. Sabré Cook managed to pass Moore for 8th on the penultimate lap.

At the front, Wohlwend in third dropped back in an effort to conserve the tyres on the hot Misano circuit, before settling for the final spot on the podium. The championship leaders Visser and Chadwick pushed each other to the flag, and it would be the Briton who came out on top and with her second W Series victory. Visser claimed second with the fastest lap and Wohlwend scored a maiden podium in third. Koyama led home Piria in fourth, with Marta García sixth and Tasmin Pepper seventh in a quiet race for the pair. Cook finished ahead of the midfield battle in eighth, with Moore ninth and reserve driver Vivien Keszthelyi scoring the final point in tenth.

== Classification ==
=== Practice ===
Session	No.	Driver	Time	Condts
Practice 1	95	(Netherlands) Beitske Visser	1:35.193	Dry
Practice 2	85	(Japan) Miki Koyama	1:34.663	Dry

=== Qualifying ===
Pos.	No.	Driver	Time/Gap	Grid
1	5	(Liechtenstein) Fabienne Wohlwend	1:33.283	1
2	55	(United Kingdom) Jamie Chadwick	+0.044	2
3	95	(Netherlands) Beitske Visser	+0.200	3
4	27	(United Kingdom) Alice Powell	+0.577	4
5	11	(Italy) Vittoria Piria	+0.698	5
6	85	(Japan) Miki Koyama	+0.761	6
7	19	(Spain) Marta García	+0.795	7
8	2	(United Kingdom) Esmee Hawkey	+0.985	13^{1}
9	26	(United Kingdom) Sarah Moore	+1.191	8
10	31	(South Africa) Tasmin Pepper	+1.236	9
11	77	(Hungary) Vivien Keszthelyi	+1.242	10
12	3	(Poland) Gosia Rdest	+1.406	11
13	58	(Belgium) Sarah Bovy	+1.561	12
14	99	(Germany) Naomi Schiff	+1.602	14
15	37	(United States) Sabré Cook	+1.692	15
16	49	(Canada) Megan Gilkes	+1.986	16
17	21	(United Kingdom) Jessica Hawkins	+2.001	17
18	67	(United States) Shea Holbrook	+2.394	18
19	20	(Australia) Caitlin Wood	+2.912	19

^1 Hawkey was given a 5-place grid penalty for causing a collision in the previous race.

=== Race ===
Pos.	No.	Driver	Laps	Time/Retired	Grid	Pts
1	55	(United Kingdom) Jamie Chadwick	20	32:45.929	2	25
2	95	(Netherlands) Beitske Visser	20	+0.587	3	18
3	5	(Liechtenstein) Fabienne Wohlwend	20	+2.285	1	15
4	85	(Japan) Miki Koyama	20	+10.434	6	12
5	11	(Italy) Vittoria Piria	20	+14.200	5	10
6	19	(Spain) Marta García	20	+16.118	7	8
7	31	(South Africa) Tasmin Pepper	20	+19.009	10	6
8	37	(United States) Sabré Cook	20	+28.518	15	4
9	26	(United Kingdom) Sarah Moore	20	+28.994	8	2
10	77	(Hungary) Vivien Keszthelyi	20	+29.460	10	1
11	2	(United Kingdom) Esmee Hawkey	20	+31.265	13	
12	58	(Belgium) Sarah Bovy	20	+32.222	12	
13	3	(Poland) Gosia Rdest	20	+33.671	11	
14	20	(Australia) Caitlin Wood	20	+34.043	19	
15	21	(United Kingdom) Jessica Hawkins	20	+36.002^{1}	17	
16	67	(United States) Shea Holbrook	20	+39.107	18	
17	49	(Canada) Megan Gilkes	20	+39.334	16	
18	99	(Germany) Naomi Schiff	20	+40.795	14	
Ret	27	(United Kingdom) Alice Powell	0	Crash	4	
Fastest lap set by Beitske Visser: 1:34.613

^1 Hawkins was given a 5-second time penalty for not adhering to track limits.

== Championship standings ==
+/-	Pos.	Driver	Pts	Gap
	1	(United Kingdom) Jamie Chadwick	68	
	2	(Netherlands) Beitske Visser	55	-13
1	3	(Spain) Marta García	35	-33
1	4	(United Kingdom) Alice Powell	33	-35
1	5	(Liechtenstein) Fabienne Wohlwend	29	-39

== See also ==
- 2019 DTM Misano round

Previous race: 2019 W Series Zolder round	W Series; 2019 season	Next race: 2019 W Series Nuremberg round
