= Tasmin Pepper =

South African race driver

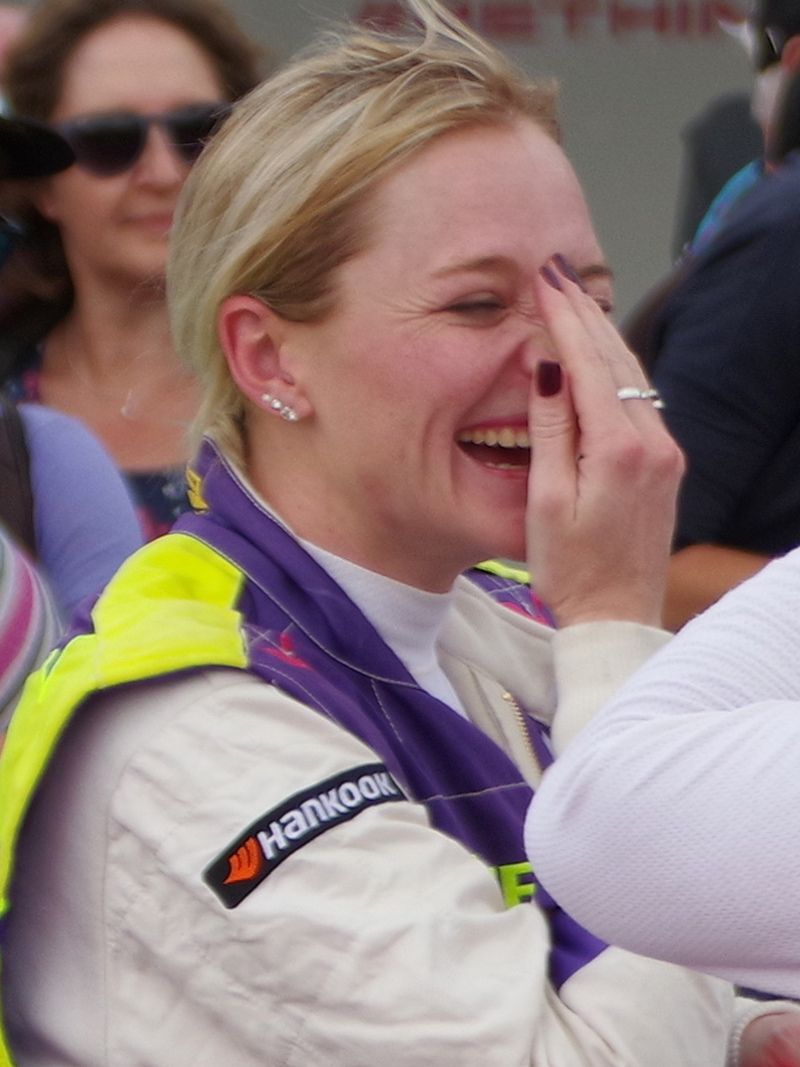
- Pepper in 2019
- Nationality: (South Africa) South African
- Born: Tasmin Jay Pepper; 19 June 1990 (age 36) Edenvale, Gauteng, South Africa
- Relatives: Jordan Pepper (brother)

W Series
- Categorisation: FIA Silver (until 2021); FIA Bronze (2022–)
- Years active: 2019
- Starts: 6
- Wins: 0
- Poles: 0
- Fastest laps: 0
- Best finish: 10th in 2019

Previous series
- 2006–07 2008 2009–12 2013–18: Formula Ford South Africa; Formula BMW Pacific; Formula VW South Africa; Volkswagen Polo Cup South Africa

Tasmin Jay Pepper (born 19 June 1990) is a South African female racing driver. She was a reserve driver in W Series. She is the daughter of former South African Touring Car driver Iain Pepper, older sister of GT racer Jordan Pepper and wife of touring car driver Keegan Campos.

== Racing record ==
=== Career summary ===
| Season | Series | Position | Car | Team |
|---|---|---|---|---|
| 2006 | Formula Ford South Africa | 8th | Mygale–Ford SJ01 | N/A |
| 2007 | Formula Ford South Africa | 4th | Mygale–Ford SJ01 | N/A |
| 2008 | Formula BMW Pacific | 13th | Mygale FB02 | Team Meritus |
| 2009 | Formula VW South Africa | 4th | Reynard–Volkswagen | N/A |
| 2010 | Formula VW South Africa | **2nd** | Reynard–Volkswagen | N/A |
| 2011 | Formula VW South Africa | 4th | Reynard–Volkswagen | N/A |
| 2012 | Formula VW South Africa | 8th | Reynard–Volkswagen | N/A |
| 2013 | Volkswagen Polo Cup South Africa | 8th | Volkswagen Polo R | N/A |
| 2014 | Volkswagen Polo Cup South Africa | 5th | Volkswagen Polo R | N/A |
| 2015 | Volkswagen Polo Cup South Africa | 4th | Volkswagen Polo R | N/A |
| 2016 | Volkswagen Polo Cup South Africa | **2nd** | Volkswagen Polo R | N/A |
| 2017 | Volkswagen Polo Cup South Africa | 4th | Volkswagen Polo R | N/A |
| 2018 | Volkswagen Polo Cup South Africa | **2nd** | Volkswagen Polo R | N/A |
| 2019 | W Series | 10th | Tatuus F3 T-318 | Hitech Grand Prix |
| 2021 | Volkswagen Polo Cup South Africa | ? | Volkswagen Polo R | Campos Transport Racing |

=== Complete W Series results ===
(key) (Races in bold indicate pole position) (Races in italics indicate fastest lap)

| Year | Team | 1 | 2 | 3 | 4 | 5 | 6 | DC | Points |
|---|---|---|---|---|---|---|---|---|---|
| 2019 | Hitech GP | HOC; 8 | ZOL; 6 | MIS; 7 | NOR; 8 | ASS; Ret | BRH; 12 | 10th | 22 |
