= 2019 Hockenheim W Series round =

2019 Hockenheim W Series Round
- Race 1 of 6 of the 2019 W Series

Race details
- Date: 4 May 2019
- Official name: 2019 W Series Hockenheim round
- Location: Hockenheimring, Hockenheim, Baden-Württemberg, Germany
- Course: Permanent racing facility
- Course length: 4.574 km (2.842 miles)
- Distance: 18 laps, 82.332 km (51.156 miles)
- Weather: Damp

Pole position
- Driver: (United Kingdom) Jamie Chadwick
- Time: 1:58.894

Podium
- First: (United Kingdom) Jamie Chadwick
- Second: (United Kingdom) Alice Powell
- Third: (Spain) Marta García

The 2019 W Series Hockenheim round (also commercially referred to as #WRace1) was the first round of the 2019 W Series, and took place at the Hockenheimring in Germany on 4 May 2019. The event was an undercard to the 2019 Deutsche Tourenwagen Masters round at the same circuit.

== Report ==
=== Background ===
The event was the inaugural round of the W Series, and the first professionally organised female-only motorsport event since the final round of the Formula Woman championship for Caterhams was held at Brands Hatch in 2006.

61 drivers successfully submitted applications to contest the championship, and were required to attend an evaluation day to become part of the 18-driver grid. This evaluation, held at Austria's Wachauring, cut the number of applicants from 61 to 28, with the remainder going on to test the series-spec Tatuus–Alfa Romeo F3 T-318 at the Circuito de Almería before series judges selected the 18 regular drivers and 4 reserve drivers.

Only 54 drivers attended the 26–28 January evaluation, which consisted of 10 modules related to teamwork, fitness and media preparation along with various driving-based skill tests. Among those who did not advance to the test day were former GP3 Series drivers Samin Gómez and Carmen Jordá (the latter a series advocate who did not attend), former Australian Formula 3 driver Chelsea Angelo and former U.S.F1600 champion Ayla Ågren. The five-day test with the series cars on 22–27 March further whittled down the list of applicants, with the likes of ARCA Series driver Natalie Decker and former MSV Formula 2 driver Natalia Kowalska also missing the cut.

The only proper testing for the series regular and reserve drivers was held at the Lausitzring a fortnight prior to the Hockenheim event, with Marta García emerging quickest.

=== Practice ===
First practice was topped by reigning MRF Challenge champion Jamie Chadwick, who put the #55 half a second ahead of the experienced Finn Emma Kimiläinen and Ferrari sportscar driver Fabienne Wohlwend. Clutch issues sidelined Porsche Carrera Cup Great Britain driver Esmee Hawkey whilst American Shea Holbrook brought out the only red flag of the session.

The top three remained the same in the second session, despite the onset of rain. The gaps however increased from 0.5 to 0.9 seconds across the trio of Chadwick, Kimiläinen and Wohlwend. Drivers struggled to adapt to the conditions, with both Tasmin Pepper and Jessica Hawkins spinning into the gravel and bringing out red flags – the latter returning to the garage on the back of a tow-truck.

Series reserve drivers Sarah Bovy and Vivien Keszthelyi joined the regular field of 18 for Friday practice. In Practice 1, Bovy placed 11th and Keszthelyi 17th, however both were at the bottom of the timesheets in the wet second session.

=== Qualifying ===
Qualifying was held in wet conditions. Beitske Visser set the early pace, however ended up watching the majority of the session from the sidelines with turbocharger failure, and Chadwick soon surpassed her. By the mid-portion of the session, Chadwick put herself 1.7 seconds ahead of the rest of the pack led by Sarah Moore. Wohlwend was the one to break the 1-second margin held by Chadwick with ten minutes remaining, however the Briton continued to set the pace becoming the first to set a time under the 2-minute mark in the damp session. The red flag came out with 3 and a half minutes remaining following a spin into the gravel at the Sachs Kurve for Alice Powell, and the session would not restart. As a result, Chadwick scored the first pole position in W Series history, with a large gap back to Wohlwend and a similar margin to Moore in 3rd.

=== Race ===
The race started at 4:10pm CET on a drying track. Both Chadwick and Wohlwend both had good initial launches however Wohlwend – starting on the wet side of the circuit – encountered wheelspin whilst going up through the gears, dropping her to 5th by turn one. Both Kimiläinen and Sabré Cook stalled off the start, however Kimiläinen would not advance beyond the hairpin as Megan Gilkes suffered brake failure behind her and would smack into the front-right corner of the Finn, eliminating both on the spot and bringing out the Safety Car. Before the Safety Car was deployed however, Chadwick ran wide on a damp part of the track and handed the lead of the race to Alice Powell.

On the restart, Chadwick got back past Powell whilst Marta García moved herself into 3rd place at the expense of Moore, and the top three began to pull away from the rest of the field. The battle for fourth, fifth and sixth between Visser, Moore and Wohlwend also began to pull away from Esmee Hawkey in 7th, who was struggling for pace and came under attack from Vittoria Piria and the hard-charging Miki Koyama. Koyama made an opportunistic move on Piria, with the Italian spinning at the hairpin and collecting a polystyrene advertising board. With two laps to go, Koyama put a forceful move on Hawkey, which sent the Brit down the order and out of the points. Despite the fastest lap for the Japanese driver, she could not close the gap between herself and Wohlwend by the flag.

Chadwick went on to win the first W Series race ahead of Powell and García on the podium, with a gap back to the group of Visser, Moore and Wohlwend with Koyama coming from 17th on the grid to finish 7th, with the points rounded out by Tasmin Pepper (who also made a comeback having started 16th), Gosia Rdest and Caitlin Wood.

== Classification ==
=== Practice ===
| Session | No. | Driver | Time | Condts |
|---|---|---|---|---|
| Practice 1 | 55 | (United Kingdom) Jamie Chadwick | 1:38.650 | Dry |
| Practice 2 | 55 | (United Kingdom) Jamie Chadwick | 1:56.007 | Wet |

=== Qualifying ===
| Pos. | No. | Driver | Time | Gap |
|---|---|---|---|---|
| 1 | 55 | (United Kingdom) Jamie Chadwick | 1:58.894 | |
| 2 | 5 | (Liechtenstein) Fabienne Wohlwend | 2:00.624 | +1.730 |
| 3 | 26 | (United Kingdom) Sarah Moore | 2:01.538 | +2.644 |
| 4 | 7 | (Finland) Emma Kimiläinen | 2:01.673 | +2.779 |
| 5 | 19 | (Spain) Marta García | 2:01.992 | +3.098 |
| 6 | 27 | (United Kingdom) Alice Powell | 2:02.729 | +3.835 |
| 7 | 11 | (Italy) Vittoria Piria | 2:03.340 | +4.446 |
| 8 | 95 | (Netherlands) Beitske Visser | 2:03.463 | +4.569 |
| 9 | 2 | (United Kingdom) Esmee Hawkey | 2:04.298 | +5.404 |
| 10 | 3 | (Poland) Gosia Rdest | 2:04.478 | +5.584 |
| 11 | 21 | (United Kingdom) Jessica Hawkins | 2:04.616 | +5.722 |
| 12 | 20 | (Australia) Caitlin Wood | 2:05.529 | +6.635 |
| 13 | 37 | (United States) Sabré Cook | 2:05.644 | +6.750 |
| 14 | 49 | (Canada) Megan Gilkes | 2:05.676 | +6.782 |
| 15 | 99 | (Germany) Naomi Schiff | 2:05.914 | +7.020 |
| 16 | 31 | (South Africa) Tasmin Pepper | 2:06.069 | +7.175 |
| 17 | 85 | (Japan) Miki Koyama | 2:06.666 | +7.772 |
| 18 | 67 | (United States) Shea Holbrook | 2:07.112 | +8.218 |

=== Race ===
| Pos. | No. | Driver | Laps | Time/Retired | Grid | Pts |
|---|---|---|---|---|---|---|
| 1 | 55 | (United Kingdom) Jamie Chadwick | 18 | 32:59.079 | 1 | 25 |
| 2 | 27 | (United Kingdom) Alice Powell | 18 | +1.329 | 6 | 18 |
| 3 | 19 | (Spain) Marta García | 18 | +1.692 | 5 | 15 |
| 4 | 95 | (Netherlands) Beitske Visser | 18 | +3.473 | 8 | 12 |
| 5 | 26 | (United Kingdom) Sarah Moore | 18 | +5.771 | 3 | 10 |
| 6 | 5 | (Liechtenstein) Fabienne Wohlwend | 18 | +7.049 | 2 | 8 |
| 7 | 85 | (Japan) Miki Koyama | 18 | +8.811 | 17 | 6 |
| 8 | 31 | (South Africa) Tasmin Pepper | 18 | +17.136 | 16 | 4 |
| 9 | 3 | (Poland) Gosia Rdest | 18 | +18.889 | 10 | 2 |
| 10 | 20 | (Australia) Caitlin Wood | 18 | +20.384 | 12 | 1 |
| 11 | 21 | (United Kingdom) Jessica Hawkins | 18 | +21.573 | 11 | |
| 12 | 2 | (United Kingdom) Esmee Hawkey | 18 | +22.995 | 9 | |
| 13 | 37 | (United States) Sabré Cook | 18 | +23.365 | 13 | |
| 14 | 99 | (Germany) Naomi Schiff | 18 | +25.332 | 15 | |
| 15 | 11 | (Italy) Vittoria Piria | 18 | +31.757 | 7 | |
| 16 | 67 | (United States) Shea Holbrook | 18 | +46.206 | 18 | |
| Ret | 7 | (Finland) Emma Kimiläinen | 0 | Crash | 4 | |
| Ret | 49 | (Canada) Megan Gilkes | 0 | Crash | 14 | |

== Championship standings ==
| Pos. | Driver | Pts | Gap |
|---|---|---|---|
| 1 | (United Kingdom) Jamie Chadwick | 25 | |
| 2 | (United Kingdom) Alice Powell | 18 | -7 |
| 3 | (Spain) Marta García | 15 | -10 |
| 4 | (Netherlands) Beitske Visser | 12 | -13 |
| 5 | (United Kingdom) Sarah Moore | 10 | -15 |

== See also ==
- 2019 DTM Hockenheim round

| Previous race: None | W Series; 2019 season | Next race: 2019 W Series Zolder round |
