= 2019 Zolder W Series round =

2019 Zolder W Series Round
- Race 2 of 6 of the 2019 W Series

Race details
- Date: 18 May 2019
- Official name: 2019 W Series Zolder round
- Location: Circuit Zolder, Heusden-Zolder, Belgium
- Course: Permanent racing facility
- Course length: 4.011 km (2.492 miles)
- Distance: 19 laps, 76.209 km (47.348 miles)

Pole position
- Driver: (United Kingdom) Jamie Chadwick
- Time: 1:28.681

Fastest lap
- Driver: (Netherlands) Beitske Visser
- Time: 1:29.629

Podium
- First: (Netherlands) Beitske Visser
- Second: (United Kingdom) Jamie Chadwick
- Third: (United Kingdom) Alice Powell

The 2019 W Series Zolder round (also commercially referred to as #WRace2) was the second round of the 2019 W Series, and took place at Circuit Zolder in Belgium on 18 May 2019. The event was an undercard to the 2019 Deutsche Tourenwagen Masters round at the same circuit.

Briton Jamie Chadwick took pole position but the race was won by Dutch driver Beitske Visser, who took an early lead and was able to hold on to it despite two safety car periods. Chadwick finished in second place, despite a late race charge by Alice Powell, who claimed the final podium place in third.

== Report ==
=== Background ===
In October 2018, it was announced that W Series parent series, the Deutsche Tourenwagen Masters, would be returning to Zolder for the first time since 2002 and, as a consequence, the W Series would also race there.

Following her victory in the previous round, Jamie Chadwick entered the weekend with a 7-point lead over fellow Briton Alice Powell, with a further 3 point gap back to Spain's Marta García.

=== Practice ===
FP1 would be a dry session. Jamie Chadwick continued her run of form from the previous round at the Hockenheimring, finishing ahead of Emma Kimiläinen by just over half a second, followed closely by Beitske Visser with Jessica Hawkins showing marked improvements from the opening round to finish the session fourth. Vittoria Piria brought out the only red flag of the session with a spin into the gravel.

The second free practice session was held in mixed conditions. The session was delayed by 10 minutes, with the unpredictable Belgian weather bringing rain late into the session. All representative times were set early, with Visser outpacing Chadwick by three tenths of a second ahead of Marta García and Tasmin Pepper; the South African improving from 18th in the opening session. Most competitors ended their sessions with the onset of rain, however Gosia Rdest proved the exception in an attempt to gain wet-weather mileage.

As in Hockenheim, the series reserve drivers Sarah Bovy and Vivien Keszthelyi ran in free practice. They finished 12th and 10th respectively in the opening session, however technical issues would sideline Hungarian driver Keszthelyi in the second session, with Bovy ending FP2 in 15th. Later on Friday, local driver Bovy received the call-up to join the regular field in the race.

=== Qualifying ===
Ahead of qualifying, Kimiläinen was forced to pull out of the event after it was discovered that her accident with Megan Gilkes in the previous event had re-ignited a neck injury sustained in a Scandinavian Touring Car Championship accident three years prior. She was replaced with second reserve driver Keszthelyi, bringing the field back up to 19 cars.

Jamie Chadwick claimed her second pole position of the year by just over a tenth of a second from Beitske Visser, who had led the majority of the session.

=== Race ===
The race began under confusing circumstances. At the conclusion of the formation lap, Sarah Bovy's car pulled up a long way behind the grid with smoke pouring from the engine. The flag-waving marshal at the back of the field gave the all clear, but Bovy managed to restart her car and drive into her last-placed grid slot before the light sequence. Starting second, Beitske Visser got the jump on pole-sitter Chadwick, and the rest of the field left the grid cleanly – however Gosia Rdest jumped the start and dived into the mid-pack at turn one, forcing Fabienne Wohlwend and Tasmin Pepper onto the dirty outside line and dropping both to the back of the top ten. The safety car was deployed as the mechanical issues became terminal for Bovy, with the Belgian not making it off the grid in her home race.

After a single lap behind the safety car, the race got underway again. Visser remained in the lead from Chadwick, however at the end of the lap Esmee Hawkey made an ambitious move on Rdest at the Bolderbergbocht for 7th, with the pair tangling wheels and crashing out of the race. In the lead up to the same corner, Sabré Cook bumped into the rear wheel of Vivien Keszthelyi, sending the Hungarian reserve driver into the barriers and also out of the race. The safety car was deployed once again, and Cook later received a drive-through penalty for her involvement in the incident.

At the restart, Visser pulled away at the front, leaving Chadwick to defend from Alice Powell. Further down the field, Miki Koyama again proved her overtaking prowess by passing Caitlin Wood for 8th at the Kleine Chicane, having started 13th. Marta García meanwhile began to form a train, with her fourth place under attack from Sarah Moore, Pepper and Wohlwend. The Liechtensteiner attempted a move on Pepper at the Bolderbergbocht, however significantly locked-up her front-right wheel and fell into a no-mans-land between the South African and Koyama.

With a handful of laps remaining, Chadwick locked her rear wheels and ran wide at the Ickx Chicane, allowing Powell to close up. The Britons went into combat, spending most of laps 16 and 17 side by side with both holding the upper hand at various points. At the flag however, it was Visser who won her first open-wheel race since 2013 ahead Chadwick and Powell (the winner from Hockenheim victorious in the battle of the Brits), followed by the group of García, Moore, Pepper and Wohlwend, the latter having regained time in the closing laps. Koyama, having made good progress to 8th early failed to advance any further, with Vittoria Piria finishing in 9th and Naomi Schiff claiming the final point having benefitted from Caitlin Wood running through the gravel on the final lap.

== Classification ==
=== Practice ===
Session	No.	Driver	Time	Condts
Practice 1	55	(United Kingdom) Jamie Chadwick	1:28.862	Dry
Practice 2	95	(Netherlands) Beitske Visser	1:29.490	Mixed

=== Qualifying ===
Pos.	No.	Driver	Time/Gap	Grid
1	55	(United Kingdom) Jamie Chadwick	1:28.681	1
2	95	(Netherlands) Beitske Visser	+0.116	2
3	27	(United Kingdom) Alice Powell	+0.441	3
4	19	(Spain) Marta García	+0.450	4
5	26	(United Kingdom) Sarah Moore	+0.774	5
6	5	(Liechtenstein) Fabienne Wohlwend	+0.817	6
7	31	(South Africa) Tasmin Pepper	+0.859	7
8	2	(United Kingdom) Esmee Hawkey	+0.976	8
9	11	(Italy) Vittoria Piria	+1.147	9
10	3	(Poland) Gosia Rdest	+1.169	10
11	20	(Australia) Caitlin Wood	+1.408	11
12	99	(Germany) Naomi Schiff	+1.476	12
13	85	(Japan) Miki Koyama	+1.526	13
14	21	(United Kingdom) Jessica Hawkins	+1.535	17^{1}
15	67	(United States) Shea Holbrook	+1.578	14
16	49	(Canada) Megan Gilkes	+1.704	15
17	77	(Hungary) Vivien Keszthelyi	+2.010	16
18	37	(United States) Sabré Cook	+2.063	18
19	58	(Belgium) Sarah Bovy	+2.782	19

^1 Hawkins was given a three-place grid penalty for crossing the pit exit line.

=== Race ===
Pos.	No.	Driver	Laps	Time/Retired	Grid	Pts
1	95	(Netherlands) Beitske Visser	19	32:28.495	2	25
2	55	(United Kingdom) Jamie Chadwick	19	+8.451	1	18
3	27	(United Kingdom) Alice Powell	19	+9.084	3	15
4	19	(Spain) Marta García	19	+12.279	4	12
5	26	(United Kingdom) Sarah Moore	19	+12.739	5	10
6	31	(South Africa) Tasmin Pepper	19	+13.185	7	8
7	5	(Liechtenstein) Fabienne Wohlwend	19	+13.973	6	6
8	85	(Japan) Miki Koyama	19	+17.654	13	4
9	11	(Italy) Vittoria Piria	19	+25.871	9	2
10	99	(Germany) Naomi Schiff	19	+26.937	12	1
11	20	(Australia) Caitlin Wood	19	+29.596	11	
12	67	(United States) Shea Holbrook	19	+30.859	14	
13	21	(United Kingdom) Jessica Hawkins	19	+39.274	17	
14	49	(Canada) Megan Gilkes	19	+47.413	15	
15	37	(United States) Sabré Cook	19	+58.053	18	
Ret	3	(Poland) Gosia Rdest	2	Crash	10	
Ret	2	(United Kingdom) Esmee Hawkey	2	Crash	8	
Ret	77	(Hungary) Vivien Keszthelyi	2	Crash	16	
DNS	58	(Belgium) Sarah Bovy	0	Engine	19	
Fastest lap set by Beitske Visser: 1:29.629

== Championship standings ==
+/-	Pos	Driver	Pts	Gap
	1	(United Kingdom) Jamie Chadwick	43	
2	2	(Netherlands) Beitske Visser	37	-6
1	3	(United Kingdom) Alice Powell	33	-10
1	4	(Spain) Marta García	27	-16
	5	(United Kingdom) Sarah Moore	20	-23

== See also ==
- 2019 DTM Zolder round

Previous race: 2019 W Series Hockenheim round	W Series; 2019 season	Next race: 2019 W Series Misano round
