= Megan Gilkes =

Canadian racing driver

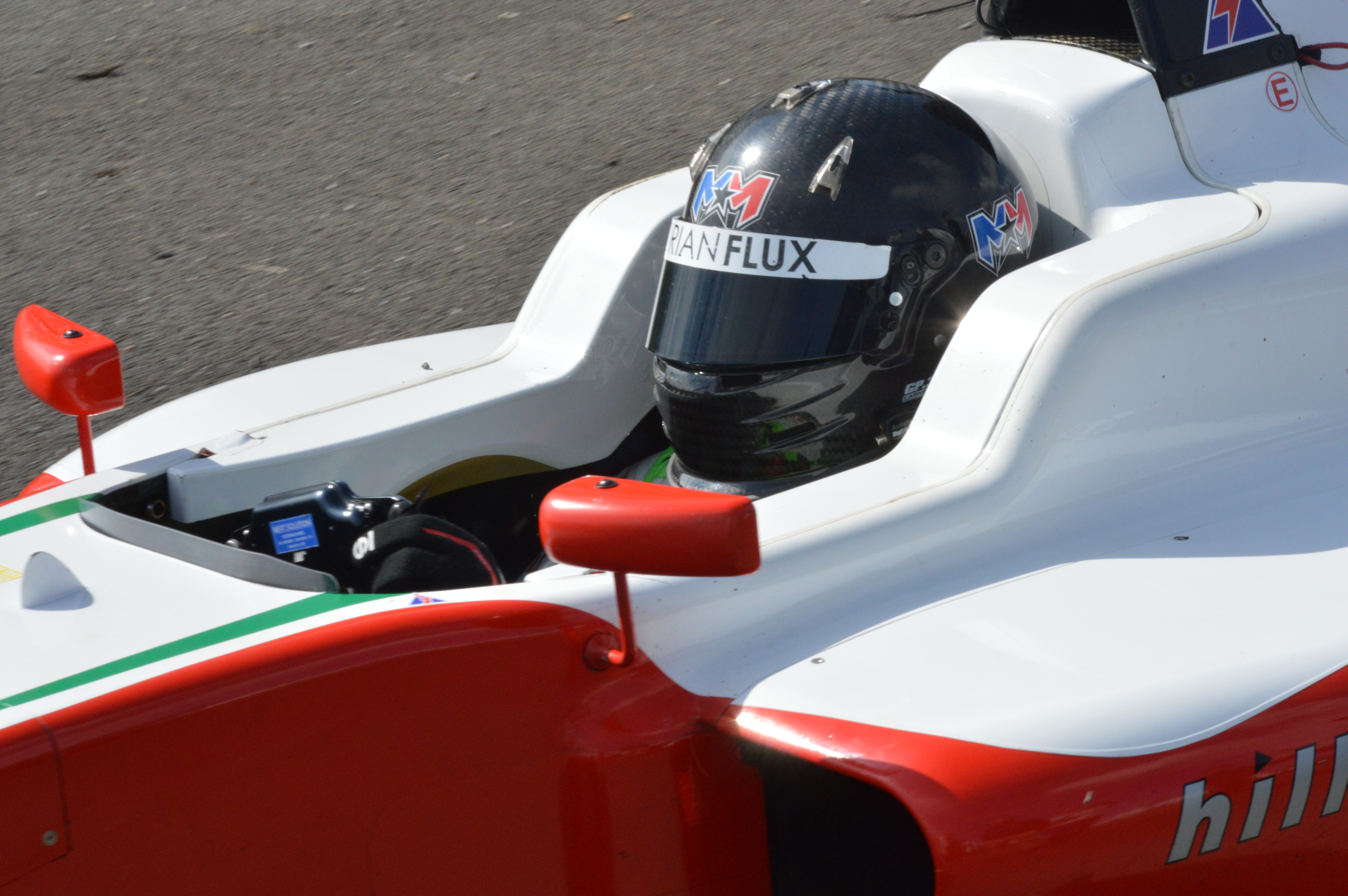
- Gilkes in 2022
- Nationality: (Canada) Canadian
- Born: November 6, 2000 (age 26) Richmond Hill, Ontario, Canada
- Retired: 2023
- Relatives: Nick Gilkes (brother)

W Series
- Years active: 2019
- Starts: 5
- Wins: 0
- Poles: 0
- Fastest laps: 0
- Best finish: NC in 2019

Previous series
- 2017–18: F1200 Canada

Megan Gilkes (born November 6, 2000) is a Canadian retired racing driver who last competed in F1 Academy. She previously competed in the now defunct W Series in 2019.

== Biography ==
A third-generation racer, Gilkes began karting aged nine in her then-home of Barbados. Following a break from racing after a crash in qualifying at the World Finals where she broke her wrist, she won the Ottawa Challenge Karting Cup in her home country of Canada, and finished runner up in the 2016 Eastern Canadian Karting Championship as an ambassador for Dare to be Different. In 2017, Gilkes stepped up to single-seaters in the Canadian F1200 championship. Despite not contesting all of the rounds in either season she competed in, she finished third and second overall in consecutive years. That same year, Gilkes finished runner up in the Sports Car Club of America Southeast Majors championship, having led it for ten of the twelve rounds.

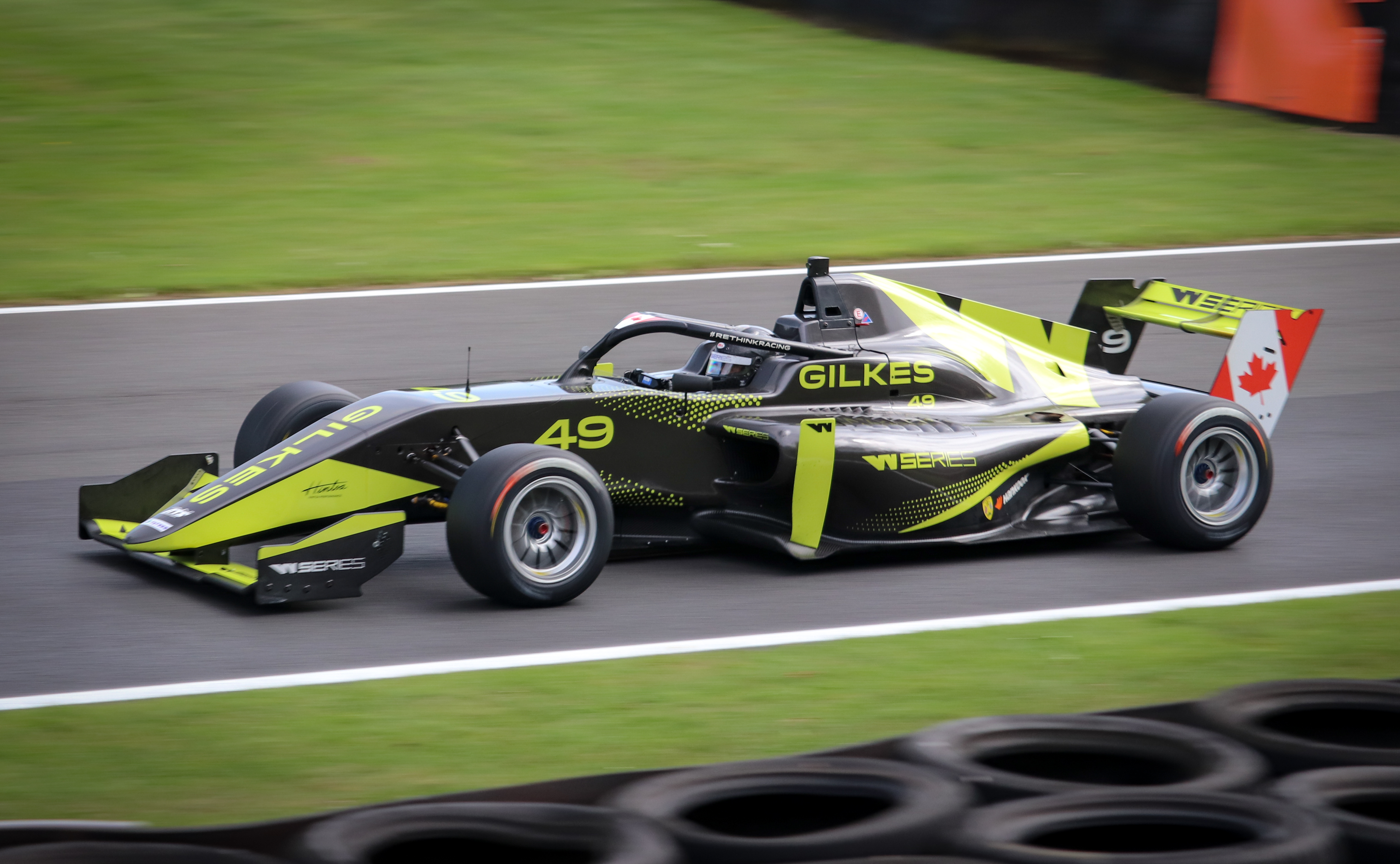
Gilkes competing in the 2019 W Series Brands Hatch round.

In 2019, Gilkes applied for the W Series, a European-based Formula Regional championship solely for women. She was selected into the category as one of 18 full-time drivers, but struggled for results as the least experienced driver in the field. Despite winning the non-championship reverse grid race at TT Circuit Assen, she failed to score any points in the regular series races and finished last in the standings. Gilkes returned to Canada in 2020, competing in the Ontario Formula 1600 Championship, where she had two pole positions, two fastest race laps and thirteen podium finishes, and was runner up overall in the series to Mac Clark.

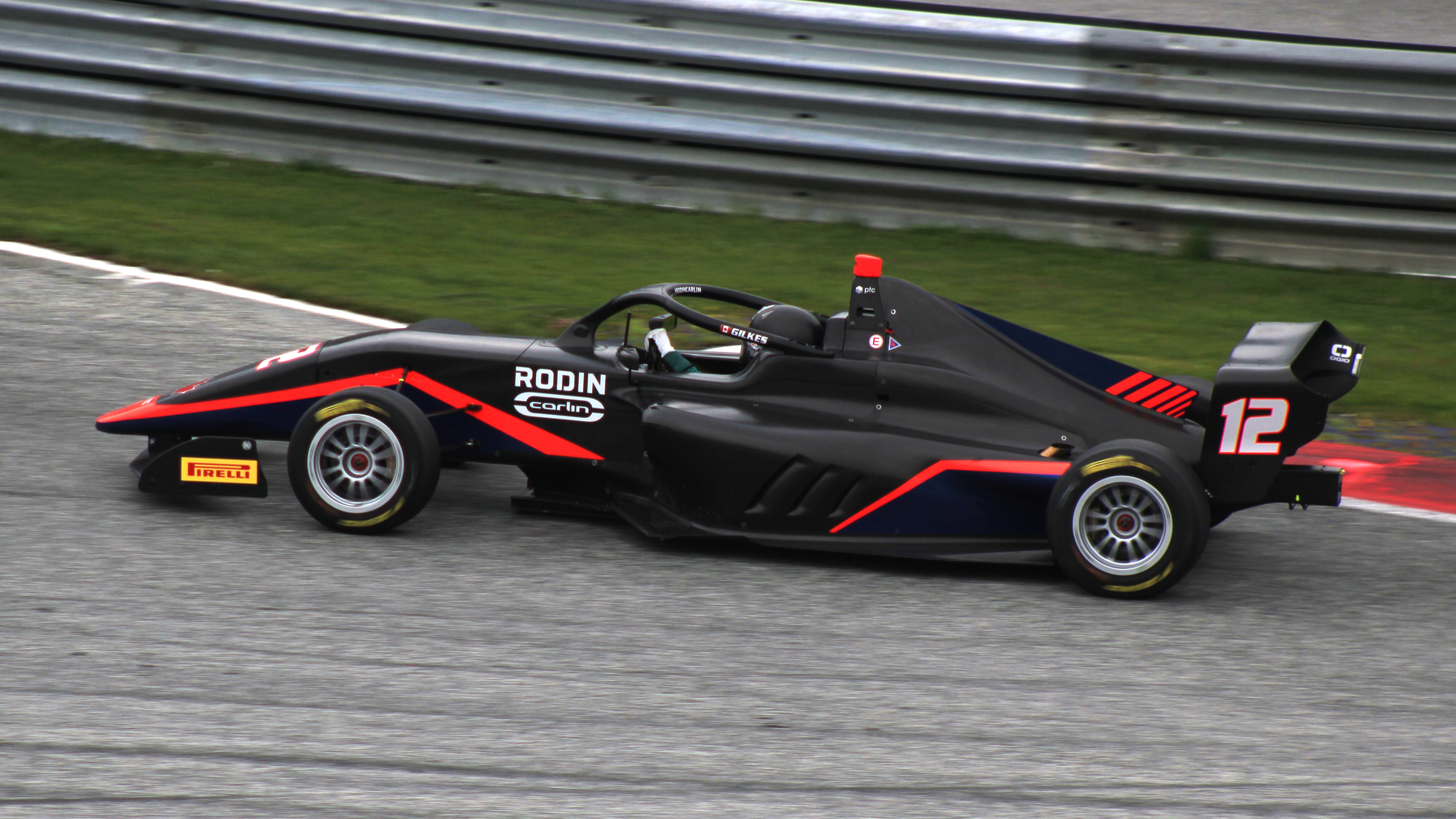
Gilkes competing in an F1 Academy race at the Red Bull Ring in 2023.

Gilkes returned to the UK in 2022 through the GB4 Championship, placing sixth in the standings with two wins at Snetterton and Donington Park. The Canadian was accepted into another female-only series, F1 Academy, for 2023, but only managed thirteenth out of fifteen in the championship with two top-five finishes. At the end of the season, Gilkes announced her retirement at 22 years of age to take up an engineering position at the Aston Martin F1 Team.

== Personal life ==
Gilkes has a younger brother Nick who is currently competing in Eurocup-3 for Drivex.

Alongside her racing, Gilkes studied Aeronautical Engineering at the Imperial College in London. She currently works for the Aston Martin F1 Team as a trackside support engineer.

== Racing record ==
=== Career summary ===
Season	Series	Team	Races	Wins	Poles	F/Laps	Podiums	Points	Position
2017	Canadian Formula 1200 Championship	Vallis Motorsports	15	2	0	0	10	1148	**3rd**
2017	SCCA National Championship Runoffs - Formula Vee	Millers Oils	1	0	0	0	0	0	23rd
2018	Canadian Formula 1200 Championship	Vallis Motorsports	9	1	0	0	7	738	**2nd**
2018	Formula Vee Challenge Cup Series	Vallis Motorsports	9	3	1	0	3	130	4th
2018	F2000 Championship Series	N/A	2	0	0	0	0	22	25th
2018	SCCA Majors Championship Nationwide - Formula Vee	N/A	2	0	0	0	0	29	43rd
2018	Campeonato Paulista de Formula Vee	N/A	2	0	0	0	0	14	15th
2019	W Series	Hitech GP	5	0	0	0	0	0	20th
2019	F3 Americas Championship	Momentum Motorsports	4	0	0	0	0	2	17th
2019	F2000 Championship Series	Vallis Motor Sport	2	0	0	0	0	28	23rd
2020	F1600 Ontario	Brian Graham Racing	15	0	1	2	11	275	**2nd**
2020	BRSCC Formula Ford Festival	Kevin Mills Racing	1	0	0	0	0	N/A	20th
2021	BRSCC National Formula Ford Championship - Pro	Kevin Mills Racing	17	0	0	0	0	106	10th
2022	GB4 Championship	Hillspeed	24	2	1	3	3	375	6th
2022	BRSCC National Formula Ford Championship - Pro		7	0	0	0	0	56	15th
2023	F1 Academy	Rodin Carlin	21	0	0	0	0	31	13th
2025	Walter Hayes Trophy	Team Dolan	2	0	0	0	0	0	N/A
2026	Walter Hayes Trophy	Team Dolan	1	0	0	0	0	0	N/A

=== SCCA National Championship Runoffs ===
Year	Track	Car	Engine	Class	Finish	Start	Status
2017	Indianapolis Motor Speedway	BRD AFV-01	Volkswagen	Formula Vee	23	24	Running

=== Complete W Series results ===
(key) (Races in bold indicate pole position) (Races in italics indicate fastest lap)

Year	Team	1	2	3	4	5	6	DC	Points
2019	Hitech GP	HOC; Ret	ZOL; 14	MIS; 17	NRM; PO	ASN; 14	BRH; 18	20th	0

=== Complete F1600 Ontario results ===
(key) (Races in bold indicate pole position) (Races in italics indicate fastest lap) (Races with * indicate most race laps led)

Year	Team	1	2	3	4	5	6	7	8	9	10	11	12	13	14	15	Rank	Points
2020	Brian Graham Racing	**MSP1**; **1**; 2*	**MSP1**; **2**; 2	**MSP1**; **3**; 2	MSP2; 1; 16*	MSP2; 2 DNS	MSP2; 3 DNS	SMP; 1; 2	SMP; 2; 3	SMP; 3; 3	MSP3; 1; 2	MSP3; 2; 2	MSP3; 3; 4	MSP4; 1; 2	MSP4; 2; 2	MSP4; 3; 2	2nd	275

=== Complete GB4 Championship results ===
(key) (Races in bold indicate pole position) (Races in italics indicate fastest lap)

Year	Entrant	1	2	3	4	5	6	7	8	9	10	11	12	13	14	15	16	17	18	19	20	21	22	23	24	DC	Points
2022	Hillspeed	SNE1; 1; 7	SNE1; 2 Ret	SNE1; 3; 1^{1}	OUL; 1; 4	OUL; 2; 5	OUL; 3; 11	SIL1; 1; 6	SIL1; 2; 4	SIL1; 3; 4^{4}	DON1; 1; 7	**DON1**; **2**; 1	DON1; 3; 8^{4}	SNE2; 1; 5	SNE2; 2; 4	SNE2; 3; 7	SIL2; 1; 3	SIL2; 2; 5	SIL2; 3; 4^{7}	BRA; 1; 6	BRA; 2; 7	BRA; 3; 9	DON2; 1; 5	DON2; 2 Ret	DON2; 3; 9	6th	375

=== Complete F1 Academy results ===
(key) (Races in bold indicate pole position; races in italics indicate fastest lap)

Year	Team	1	2	3	4	5	6	7	8	9	10	11	12	13	14	15	16	17	18	19	20	21	DC	Points
2023	Rodin Carlin	RBR; 1; 5	RBR; 2; 12	RBR; 3; 10	CRT; 1; 8	CRT; 2; 13	CRT; 3; 13†	CAT; 1; 11	CAT; 2; 11	CAT; 3; 8	ZAN; 1; 11	ZAN; 2; 7	ZAN; 3 Ret	MNZ; 1; 5	MNZ; 2 Ret	MNZ; 3 Ret	LEC; 1; 11	LEC; 2; 13	LEC; 3; 9	COA; 1; 12	COA; 2; 13	COA; 3; 11	13th	31
