= Elias Seppänen =

Finnish racing driver (born 2003)

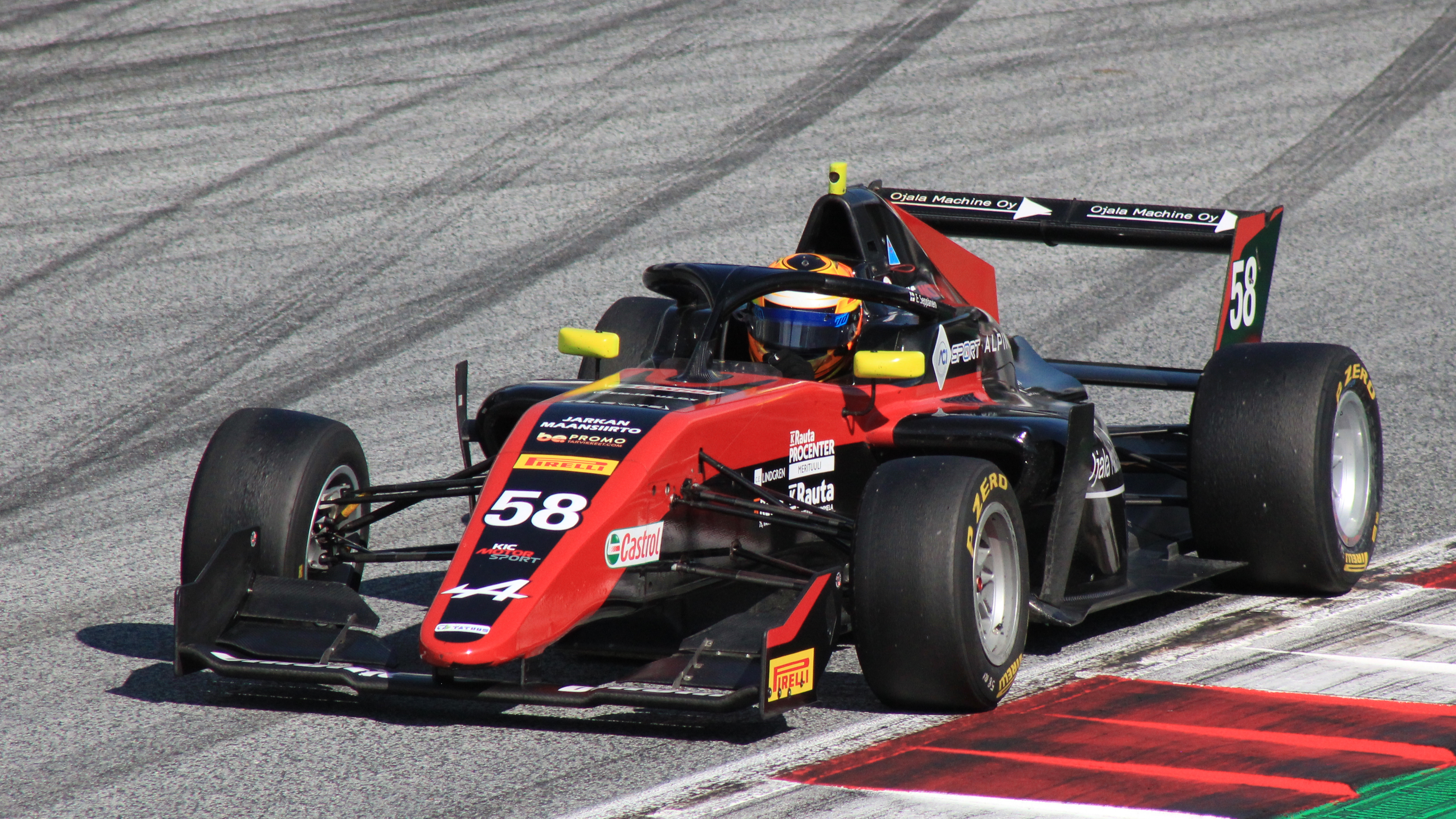
- Seppänen in 2021
- Nationality: (Finland) Finnish
- Born: Elias Antton Seppänen; 31 October 2003 (age 23) Tammela, Finland

Formula Regional European Championship career
- Debut season: 2021
- Current team: KIC Motorsport
- Categorisation: FIA Silver
- Car number: 2
- Starts: 14 (14 entries)
- Wins: 0
- Podiums: 0
- Poles: 0
- Fastest laps: 0
- Best finish: 24th in 2021

Previous series
- 2020 2020 2019 2019 2019: Formula Renault Eurocup; ADAC Formula 4 Formula 4 SEA Championship; SMP F4 Championship; Formula Academy Finland

Elias Antton Seppänen (born 31 October 2003) is a Finnish racing driver currently competing in the ADAC GT Masters with Team Landgraf, for whom he won the 2023 and the 2024 ADAC GT Masters.

== Early career ==
=== Karting ===
Born in Tammela, Seppänen started his karting career in 2014. His best result was winning the Finnish Junior Championship in the Raket class in 2016.

=== Lower formulae ===
In 2019, Seppänen made his single-seater racing debut in the F4 South East Asia Championship. He won eleven races, and with 617 points, he finished second in the standings to Irish driver Lucca Allen. He also made two guest appearances in the SMP F4 Championship and competed in the Formula Academy Finland, where he finished third in the championship.

The next year, Seppänen moved over to race in the ADAC F4 Championship with US Racing. He achieved a race victory at the Lausitzring, and with nine further podiums Seppänen finished third in the standings, only behind Red Bull juniors Jak Crawford and Jonny Edgar.

=== Formula Renault Eurocup ===
Seppänen made his debut in the Formula Renault Eurocup as a guest driver for R-ace GP in the final round of the series' history at Paul Ricard. He finished the races in 14th and eighth.

=== Formula Regional European Championship ===
In 2021, Seppänen progressed to the Formula Regional European Championship, partnering Nico Göhler and fellow Finn Patrik Pasma at KIC Motorsport. He scored his first point in the second race of the first round of the season in Imola. After seven events, Seppänen left the series, which landed him 24th overall by season's end.

== Sportscar career ==
The 2022 season saw Seppänen switch to GT machinery, as he would compete for Mann-Filter Team Landgraf in the ADAC GT Masters, driving a Mercedes-AMG GT3 Evo alongside Frank Bird. With a best race finish of fourth, the duo finished 21st in the drivers' standings. Seppänen remained with Landgraf in 2023, this time partnering Salman Owega. In a series that had been significantly weakened following the introduction of a rule which mandated each lineup to contain at least one silver-ranked driver, Seppänen and Owega took four victories, including a weekend sweep at the Sachsenring, to win the title in the final round.

In 2024, Seppänen returned to defend his GT Masters crown, this time being joined by Tom Kalender at Landgraf.

== Karting record ==
=== Karting career summary ===
Season	Series	Team	Position
2014	Finnish Junior Championship — Raket		33rd
2015	Finnish Junior Championship — Raket		11th
2016	Sydsvenskans Kart Champion Cup — Mini		1st
2016	Raket Cup Sweden — Mini		22nd
2016	Finnish Junior Championship — Raket		1st
2017	Finnish Championship — OKJ		10th
2017	Rotax Max Challenge Finland — Junior Max		24th
2017	WSK Final Cup — OK		26th
2017	Trofeo delle Industrie — OK	Forza Racing	12th
2017	CIK-FIA World Championship — OKJ		25th
2017	CIK-FIA European Championship — OKJ		27th
2017	WSK Super Master Series — OKJ		35th
2018	Finnish Championship — OK		16th
2018	CIK-FIA European Championship — OK	Forza Racing	29th
2018	WSK Super Master Series — OK		36th

== Racing record ==
=== Racing career summary ===
Season	Series	Team	Races	Wins	Poles	F/Laps	Podiums	Points	Position
2019	Formula 4 South East Asia Championship	Meritus.GP	40	11	7	10	28	617	**2nd**
2019	SMP F4 Championship	SMP Racing	2	0	0	0	0	0	NC†
2019	Formula Academy Finland	N/A	8	0	0	1	7	123	**3rd**
2020	ADAC Formula 4 Championship	US Racing	21	1	1	0	10	257	**3rd**
2020	Formula Renault Eurocup	R-ace GP	2	0	0	0	0	0	NC†
2021	Formula Regional European Championship	KIC Motorsport	14	0	0	0	0	1	24th
2022	ADAC GT Masters	Mann-Filter Team Landgraf	13	0	0	0	0	52	21st
2023	ADAC GT Masters	Landgraf Motorsport	12	4	2	2	6	181	**1st**
2024	ADAC GT Masters	Landgraf Motorsport	12	5	3	3	9	253	**1st**
2024	GT World Challenge America - Pro-Am	Regulator Racing	1	0	0	0	1	36	15th
2024-25	Asian Le Mans Series - GT	Climax Racing	6	0	1	0	0	26	14th
2025	China GT Championship - GT3	Climax Racing	7	1	3	?	2	59	5th
2025	GT World Challenge Asia	Winhere Harmony Racing	4	0	0	0	0	0	NC
2025-26	24H Series Middle East - GT3	Climax Racing	1	0	0	0	0	24	16th
2026	GT World Challenge Asia	Climax Racing	12	0	0	0	1	41	17th
2026	Lamborghini Super Trofeo Asia - Pro-Am	Climax Racing	2	0	1	1	2	0	NC†
2026	China GT Championship - GTS	Climax Racing							
2026	China GT Championship - GT3	Climax Racing	2	0	0	0	0	12*	17th*
2026	China GT Championship - GT3	Elegant Racing Team	1	0	0	0	0	12*	17th*
2026	TSS The Super Series - GT4	R Engineering							

^{†} As Seppänen was a guest driver, he was ineligible for championship points.
* Season still in progress.

=== Complete Formula 4 South East Asia Championship results ===
(key) (Races in bold indicate pole position) (Races in italics indicate fastest lap)

Year	1	2	3	4	5	6	7	8	9	10	11	12	13	14	15	16	17	18	19	20	21	22	23	24	25	26	27	28	29	30	31	32	33	34	35	36	37	38	39	40	Pos	Points
2019	SEP1; 1; 4	SEP1; 2; 3	SEP1; 3; 5	SEP1; 4; 3	SEP2; 1; 3	SEP2; 2; 1	SEP2; 3; 4	SEP2; 4; 2	BUR1; 1; 4	BUR1; 2; 3	BUR1; 3; 2	BUR1; 4; 2	BUR2; 1; 4	BUR2; 2; 3	BUR2; 3; 3	BUR2; 4; 3	**MAD1**; **1**; 1	MAD1; 2; 5	MAD1; 3; 1	**MAD1**; **4**; 1	MAD2; 1; 2	**MAD2**; **2**; 1	MAD2; 3; 4	MAD2; 4; 3	SEP3; 1; 3	SEP3; 2; 5	SEP3; 3; 4	SEP3; 4; 4	**SEP4**; **1**; 1	SEP4; 2; 1	SEP4; 3 DSQ	**SEP4**; **4**; 1	**SEP5**; **1**; 2	SEP5; 2; 2	SEP5; 3; 3	**SEP5**; **4**; 1	**SEP6**; **1**; 1	SEP6; 2; 3	SEP6; 3 Ret	**SEP6**; **4**; 1	2nd	639

=== Complete ADAC Formula 4 Championship results ===
(key) (Races in bold indicate pole position) (Races in italics indicate fastest lap)

Year	Team	1	2	3	4	5	6	7	8	9	10	11	12	13	14	15	16	17	18	19	20	21	Pos	Points
2020	US Racing	LAU1; 1; 3	LAU1; 2; 8	LAU1; 3; 1	NÜR1; 1; 3	NÜR1; 2; 2	NÜR1; 3; 4	HOC; 1; 4	HOC; 2; 6	HOC; 3; 3	NÜR2; 1 Ret	NÜR2; 2; 2	NÜR2; 3; 5	RBR; 1; 4	RBR; 2; 4	RBR; 3; 2	**LAU2**; **1**; 3	LAU2; 2 Ret	LAU2; 3; 6	OSC; 1; 3	OSC; 2; 5	OSC; 3; 3	3rd	257

=== Complete Formula Renault Eurocup results ===
(key) (Races in bold indicate pole position) (Races in italics indicate fastest lap)

Year	Team	1	2	3	4	5	6	7	8	9	10	11	12	13	14	15	16	17	18	19	20	Pos	Points
2020	R-ace GP	MNZ; 1	MNZ; 2	IMO; 1	IMO; 2	NÜR; 1	NÜR; 2	MAG; 1	MAG; 2	ZAN; 1	ZAN; 2	CAT; 1	CAT; 2	SPA; 1	SPA; 2	IMO; 1	IMO; 2	HOC; 1	HOC; 2	LEC; 1; 14	LEC; 2; 8	NC†	0

† As Seppänen was a guest driver, he was ineligible for points

=== Complete Formula Regional European Championship results ===
(key) (Races in bold indicate pole position) (Races in italics indicate fastest lap)

Year	Team	1	2	3	4	5	6	7	8	9	10	11	12	13	14	15	16	17	18	19	20	DC	Points
2021	KIC Motorsport	IMO; 1; 15	IMO; 2; 10	CAT; 1; 18	CAT; 2 Ret	MCO; 1; 12	MCO; 2; 15	LEC; 1; 15	LEC; 2; 14	ZAN; 1; 16	ZAN; 2; 13	SPA; 1; 16	SPA; 2; 19	RBR; 1; 23	RBR; 2; 17	VAL; 1	VAL; 2	MUG; 1	MUG; 2	MNZ; 1	MNZ; 2	24th	1

=== Complete ADAC GT Masters results ===
(key) (Races in bold indicate pole position) (Races in italics indicate fastest lap)

Year	Team	Car	1	2	3	4	5	6	7	8	9	10	11	12	13	14	DC	Points
2022	Mann-Filter Team Landgraf	Mercedes-AMG GT3 Evo	OSC; 1 DNS	OSC; 2; 19	RBR; 1; 20	RBR; 2; 18	ZAN; 1; 17	ZAN; 2; 9	NÜR; 1; 6	NÜR; 2; 4	LAU; 1; 16	LAU; 2 Ret	SAC; 1; 7	SAC; 2; 10	HOC; 1; 10	HOC; 2 Ret	21st	52
2023	Landgraf Motorsport	Mercedes-AMG GT3 Evo	HOC1; 1 Ret^{3}	HOC1; 2; 3^{2}	NOR; 1; 1^{1}	NOR; 2; 4	NÜR; 1; 1^{2}	NÜR; 2; 8	SAC; 1; 1^{1}	SAC; 2; 1	RBR; 1 DSQ	RBR; 2; 6	HOC2; 1; 9	HOC2; 2; 3			1st	181
2024	Landgraf Motorsport	Mercedes-AMG GT3 Evo	OSC; 1; 2^{3}	OSC; 2; 1^{2}	**ZAN**; **1**; 1^{1}	ZAN; 2; 8^{3}	NÜR; 1; 2^{2}	NÜR; 2; 6^{3}	**SPA**; **1**; 1^{1}	SPA; 2; 6^{2}	RBR; 1; 3	**RBR**; **2**; 1^{1}	HOC; 1; 3^{1}	HOC; 2; 1^{2}			1st	253
