= 2018 Formula 4 South East Asia Championship =

Motor racing competition

Seasons
- ← 2017–18 2019 →

The 2018 Formula 4 South East Asia Championship season was the third season of the Formula 4 South East Asia Championship. It began on 7 July at the Sepang International Circuit and finished on 1 December at the same venue.

== Drivers ==
The provisional driver entry list was released on 27 April 2018.

No.	Driver	Rounds
0	(Malaysia) Adam Khalid	7–8
3	(Thailand) Kane Shepherd	All
7	(Australia) Aidan Wright	2–4
8	(Denmark) Malthe Jakobsen	7–8
10	(Malaysia) Timothy Yeo	1–2, 8
11	(Malaysia) Shahkirah Shaharul	7–8
18	(Japan) Kubo Masataka	1
18	(Thailand) Sandy Stuvik	5–6
22	(Malaysia) Alister Yoong	1, 3–8
23	(Malaysia) Muizz Musyaffa	All
26	(United Kingdom) Louie Westover	8
28	(France) Alessandro Ghiretti	All
29	(Republic of Ireland) Lucca Allen	7–8
32	(Indonesia) Presley Martono	1
34	(Oman) Shihab Al Habsi	8
35	(Morocco) Moulay El Alaoui	8
42	(Republic of Ireland) Luke Thompson	1–6, 8
46	(Japan) Ryo Komikado	1, 3–8
55	(Canada) Adam D'Agostino	1–2
66	(Belgium) Antoine Potty	2–6
77	(India) Chetan Korada	4
99	(Sri Lanka) Liam Lawrence	2
99	(United Kingdom) Emily Linscott	7

== Calendar ==
The calendar for the 2018 season expanded upon the previous season. The Clark International Speedway round in the Philippines was discontinued and replaced with the Madras Motor Race Track in Chennai, India.

Rnd		Circuit	Date	Pole position	Fastest lap	Winning driver	Supporting
1	R1	(Malaysia) Sepang International Circuit, Selangor	8 July	(Thailand) Kane Shepherd	(Indonesia) Presley Martono	(France) Alessandro Ghiretti	Malaysian Speed Festival
1	R2	(Malaysia) Sepang International Circuit, Selangor	8 July		(Indonesia) Presley Martono	(Thailand) Kane Shepherd	Malaysian Speed Festival
1	R3	(Malaysia) Sepang International Circuit, Selangor	8 July		(Indonesia) Presley Martono	(Indonesia) Presley Martono	Malaysian Speed Festival
2	R1	(Malaysia) Sepang International Circuit, Selangor	14 July	(Thailand) Kane Shepherd	(Thailand) Kane Shepherd	(Thailand) Kane Shepherd	Malaysia Championship Series; F3 Asian Championship
2	R2	(Malaysia) Sepang International Circuit, Selangor	15 July		(Thailand) Kane Shepherd	(France) Alessandro Ghiretti	Malaysia Championship Series; F3 Asian Championship
2	R3	(Malaysia) Sepang International Circuit, Selangor	15 July		(Thailand) Kane Shepherd	(Malaysia) Muizz Musyaffa	Malaysia Championship Series; F3 Asian Championship
3	R1	(India) Madras Motor Race Track, Chennai	2 September	(France) Alessandro Ghiretti	(France) Alessandro Ghiretti	(France) Alessandro Ghiretti	
3	R2	(India) Madras Motor Race Track, Chennai	2 September		(France) Alessandro Ghiretti	(France) Alessandro Ghiretti	
3	R3	(India) Madras Motor Race Track, Chennai	2 September		(France) Alessandro Ghiretti	(Malaysia) Muizz Musyaffa	
4	R1	(India) Madras Motor Race Track, Chennai	9 September	(France) Alessandro Ghiretti	(France) Alessandro Ghiretti	(France) Alessandro Ghiretti	
4	R2	(India) Madras Motor Race Track, Chennai	9 September		(France) Alessandro Ghiretti	(Malaysia) Alister Yoong	
4	R3	(India) Madras Motor Race Track, Chennai	9 September		(France) Alessandro Ghiretti	(Malaysia) Muizz Musyaffa	
5	R1	(Thailand) Chang International Circuit, Buriram	26 October	(France) Alessandro Ghiretti	(Malaysia) Muizz Musyaffa	(France) Alessandro Ghiretti	Thailand Super Series
5	R2	(Thailand) Chang International Circuit, Buriram	27 October		(France) Alessandro Ghiretti	(France) Alessandro Ghiretti	Thailand Super Series
5	R3	(Thailand) Chang International Circuit, Buriram	27 October		(France) Alessandro Ghiretti	(France) Alessandro Ghiretti	Thailand Super Series
6	R1	(Thailand) Chang International Circuit, Buriram	28 October	(Thailand) Kane Shepherd	(France) Alessandro Ghiretti	(France) Alessandro Ghiretti	Thailand Super Series
6	R2	(Thailand) Chang International Circuit, Buriram	28 October		(Malaysia) Muizz Musyaffa	(France) Alessandro Ghiretti	Thailand Super Series
6	R3	(Thailand) Chang International Circuit, Buriram	28 October		(Malaysia) Muizz Musyaffa	(Thailand) Kane Shepherd	Thailand Super Series
7	R1	(Malaysia) Sepang International Circuit, Selangor	24 November	(Thailand) Kane Shepherd	(Malaysia) Muizz Musyaffa	(France) Alessandro Ghiretti	Sepang 1000 km Audi R8 LMS Cup; F3 Asian Championship
7	R2	(Malaysia) Sepang International Circuit, Selangor	25 November		(France) Alessandro Ghiretti	(France) Alessandro Ghiretti	Sepang 1000 km Audi R8 LMS Cup; F3 Asian Championship
7	R3	(Malaysia) Sepang International Circuit, Selangor	25 November		(Malaysia) Muizz Musyaffa	(France) Alessandro Ghiretti	Sepang 1000 km Audi R8 LMS Cup; F3 Asian Championship
8	R1	(Malaysia) Sepang International Circuit, Selangor	1 December	(France) Alessandro Ghiretti	(Thailand) Kane Shepherd	(France) Alessandro Ghiretti	Malaysian Speed Festival
8	R2	(Malaysia) Sepang International Circuit, Selangor	1 December		(France) Alessandro Ghiretti	(Thailand) Kane Shepherd	Malaysian Speed Festival
8	R3	(Malaysia) Sepang International Circuit, Selangor	1 December		(France) Alessandro Ghiretti	(Denmark) Malthe Jakobsen	Malaysian Speed Festival

== Championship standings ==
The series follows the standard F1 points scoring system with the addition of 1 point for fastest lap and 3 points for pole. The best 18 results out of 24 races counted towards the championship.

The fastest qualifying laps determine the grid positions for race 1. The finishing positions of the entire field in race 1 are reversed to determine the grid positions for race 2. The finishing positions of the entire field in race 2 are reversed to determine the grid positions for race 3.

Points were awarded as follows:

Position	**1st**	**2nd**	**3rd**	**4th**	**5th**	**6th**	**7th**	**8th**	**9th**	**10th**	**R1 PP**	**FL**
Points	25	18	15	12	10	8	6	4	2	1	3	1

=== Drivers' standings ===
Pos	Driver	SEP1 (Malaysia)			SEP2 (Malaysia)			MAD1 (India)			MAD2 (India)			CHA1 (Thailand)			CHA2 (Thailand)			SEP3 (Malaysia)			SEP4 (Malaysia)			Pts
1	(France) Alessandro Ghiretti	1	6	2	2	1	Ret	**1**	1	3	**1**	2	2	**1**	1	1	1	1	4	1	1	1	**1**	2	2	446
2	(Thailand) Kane Shepherd	**3**	1	4	**1**	2	2	2	2	2	2	4	3	2	2	2	**2**	6	1	**2**	Ret	2	2	1	4	365
3	(Malaysia) Muizz Musyaffa	2	5	5	5	6	1	5	3	1	Ret	9	1	3	DNS	3	3	2	3	3	Ret	3	5	3	5	266
4	(Malaysia) Alister Yoong	7	7	6				7	5	4	4	1	8	5	4	5	6	3	2	4	4	4	7	8	11	200
5	(Republic of Ireland) Luke Thompson	6	2	3	4	8	6	6	4	5	3	5	9	7	5	7	5	7	6				4	4	7	186
6	(Belgium) Antoine Potty				3	3	3	3	Ret	6	5	3	5	4	3	4	4	4	5							176
7	(Japan) Ryo Komikado	9	10	9				8	6	Ret	6	7	4	6	DNS	6	7	5	7	6	6	7	8	Ret	9	109
8	(Denmark) Malthe Jakobsen																			5	5	5	3	Ret	1	70
9	(Australia) Aidan Wright				6	5	4	4	Ret	Ret	Ret	6	6													58
10	(Malaysia) Timothy Yeo	4	4	10	Ret	4	5																10	6	10	57
11	(Indonesia) Presley Martono	5	3	1																						53
12	(Republic of Ireland) Lucca Allen																			Ret	2	6	6	5	6	52
13	(Canada) Adam D'Agostino	10	9	8	Ret	7	7																			19
14	(Oman) Shihab Al Habsi																						12	Ret	3	15
15	(Malaysia) Adam Khalid																			Ret	3	Ret	Ret	Ret	DNS	15
16	(Japan) Kubo Masataka	8	8	7																						14
17	(Malaysia) Shahkirah Shaharul																			8	8	8	13	9	13	14
18	(United Kingdom) Emily Linscott																			7	7	Ret				12
19	(Sri Lanka) Liam Lawrence				7	9	8																			12
20	(United Kingdom) Louie Westover																						9	7	8	12
21	(India) Chetan Korada										Ret	8	7													10
22	(Thailand) Sandy Stuvik													Ret	Ret	8	Ret	NC	NC							4
23	(Morocco) Moulay El Alaoui																						11	10	12	1
Pos	Driver	SEP1 (Malaysia)			SEP2 (Malaysia)			MAD1 (India)			MAD2 (India)			CHA1 (Thailand)			CHA2 (Thailand)			SEP3 (Malaysia)			SEP4 (Malaysia)			Pts

Colour	Result
Gold	Winner
Silver	Second place
Bronze	Third place
Green	Points classification
Blue	Non-points classification
Blue	Non-classified finish (NC)
Purple	Retired, not classified (Ret)
Red	Did not qualify (DNQ)
Red	Did not pre-qualify (DNPQ)
Black	Disqualified (DSQ)
White	Did not start (DNS)
White	Withdrew (WD)
White	Race cancelled (C)
Blank	Did not practice (DNP)
Blank	Did not arrive (DNA)
Blank	Excluded (EX)

**Bold** – Pole
Italics – Fastest Lap

=== Rookie Champions ===
Pos	Drivers	Pts
1	(France) Alessandro Ghiretti	420
2	(Malaysia) Muizz Musyaffa	282
3	(Belgium) Antoine Potty	188
4	(Japan) Ryo Komikado	160
5	(United Kingdom) Abdirahman Mohamed	30
6	(United Kingdom) Emily Linscott	21
7	(United Kingdom) Louie Westover	16
8	(Morocco) Moulay el Aloui	9
9	(Malaysia) Alister Yoong	0
