= Nico Pino =

Chilean racing driver (born 2004)

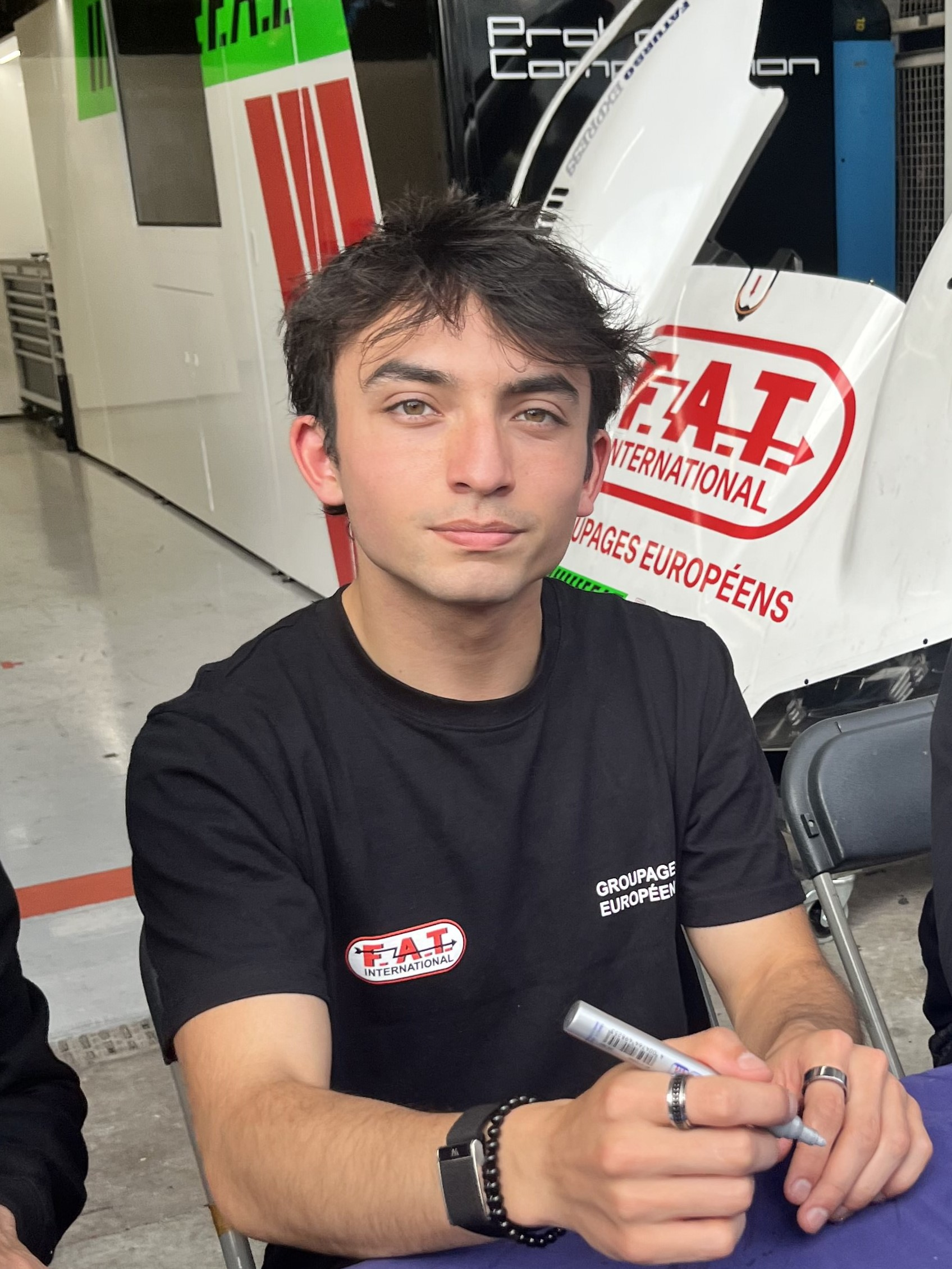
- Pino at the 2025 6 Hours of São Paulo
- Nationality: (Chile) Chilean
- Born: Nicolás Ignacio Pino Muñoz; 21 September 2004 (age 22) Santiago, Chile

FIA World Endurance Championship career
- Debut season: 2024
- Current team: Proton Competition
- Categorisation: FIA Silver
- Car number: 99
- Former teams: United Autosports
- Starts: 14 (14 entries)
- Wins: 0
- Podiums: 1
- Poles: 1
- Fastest laps: 0
- Best finish: 18th in 2024 (LMGT3)

Previous series
- 2021-24 2022-23 2021-22 2021 2020 2019: European Le Mans Series; Asian Le Mans Series; EF Open Championship; Supercars Endurance GT4 South; F4 British Championship; F4 SEA Championship

Nicolás Ignacio Pino Muñoz (born 21 September 2004) is a Chilean racing driver who currently competes in the IMSA SportsCar Championship for JDC–Miller MotorSports.

Pino is a member of A14 Management, overseen by two-time Formula One world champion Fernando Alonso.

== Early career ==
=== Karting ===
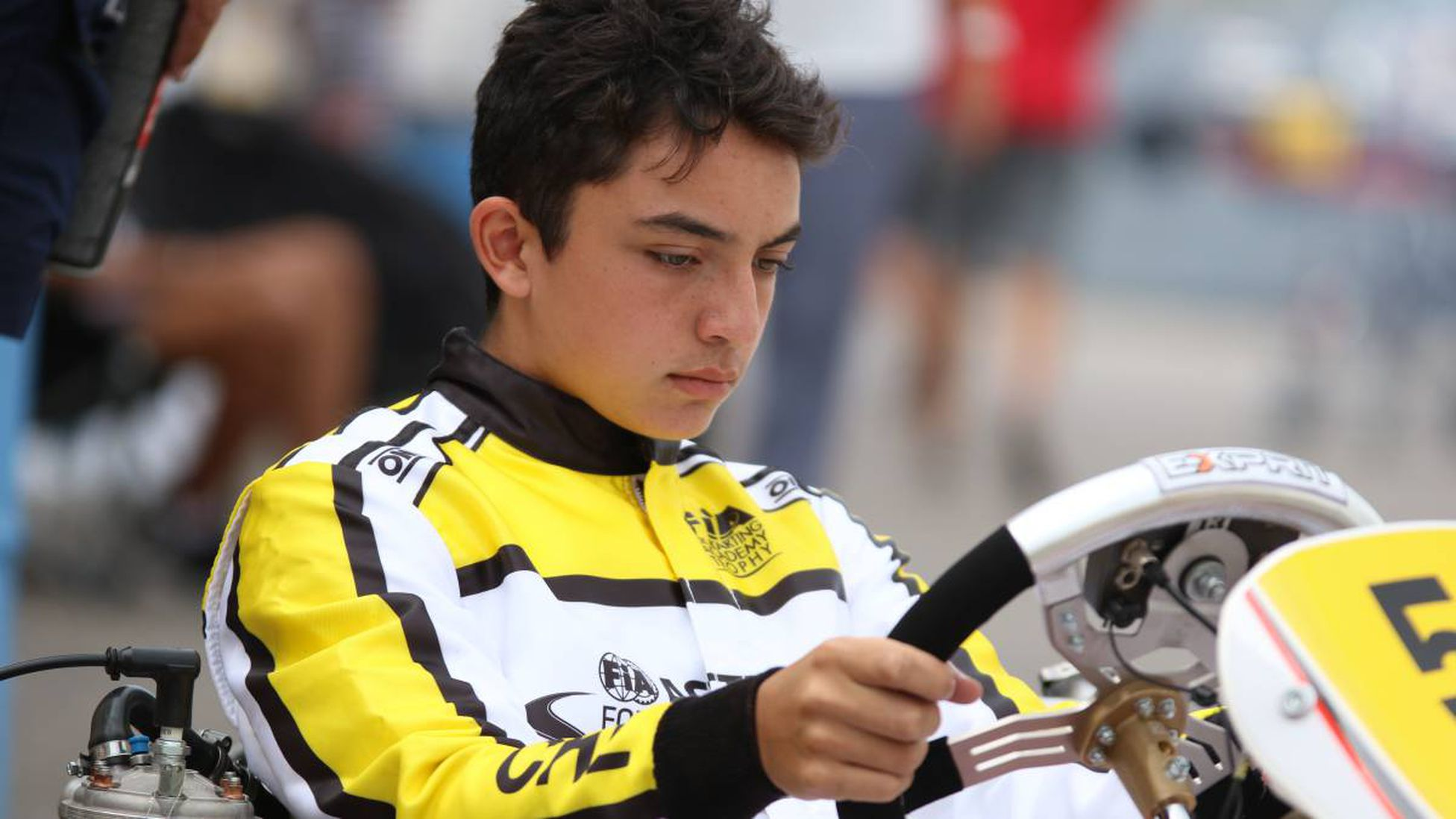
Pino at the FIA Karting World Championship in 2022.

Pino began his racing career in karting at the age of eight in Santiago de Chile until the age of thirteen, when he moved to compete on the European and World karting scene.

=== Lower formulae ===
After karting, Pino progressed into Formula 4, making appearances in the Formula 4 South East Asia Championship in 2019. In 2020, he switched to the British F4 Championship, joining Argenti Motorsport. However, following just four rounds, Pino left the series.

At the end of 2021, Pino returned to single-seaters, racing in the Euroformula Open Championship round at Monza Circuit. Pino returned to the series at the start of the following year, where he would partake in three rounds with Drivex.

== Prototype and Endurance racing ==
=== 2021–22: LMP3 successes ===
At the back end of 2021, Pino joined Inter Europol Competition for the final two races of the European Le Mans Series, driving in the LMP3 class.

Beginning 2022, Pino would drive for IEC in the Asian Le Mans Series, where he and fellow full-time teammate Guilherme Oliveira ended up seventh in the nine-car championship. Pino then embarked on a complete campaign in the ELMS, returning to IEC to partner Oliveira and Charles Crews. Despite being disqualified from the opening round due to a technical infringement, the No. 13 crew went on a title charge, winning three successive races in Monza, Barcelona, and Spa. However, following a collision between Pino and the LMP2 of Mathias Beche, the team would be forced to retire after Oliveira experienced a late crash with a GT entry, leaving the team second in the standings.

During the same year, Pino competed in two rounds of the IMSA SportsCar Championship, scoring a podium at the Petit Le Mans event with Sean Creech Motorsport.

=== 2023: LMP2 step-up ===
The AsLMS at the start of 2023 heralded Pino's debut in the LMP2 category, as he partnered László Tóth and team owner Miro Konôpka at ARC Bratislava. Their entry struggled throughout the four-race campaign, taking a best finish of seventh and classifying ninth and last in the teams' standings.

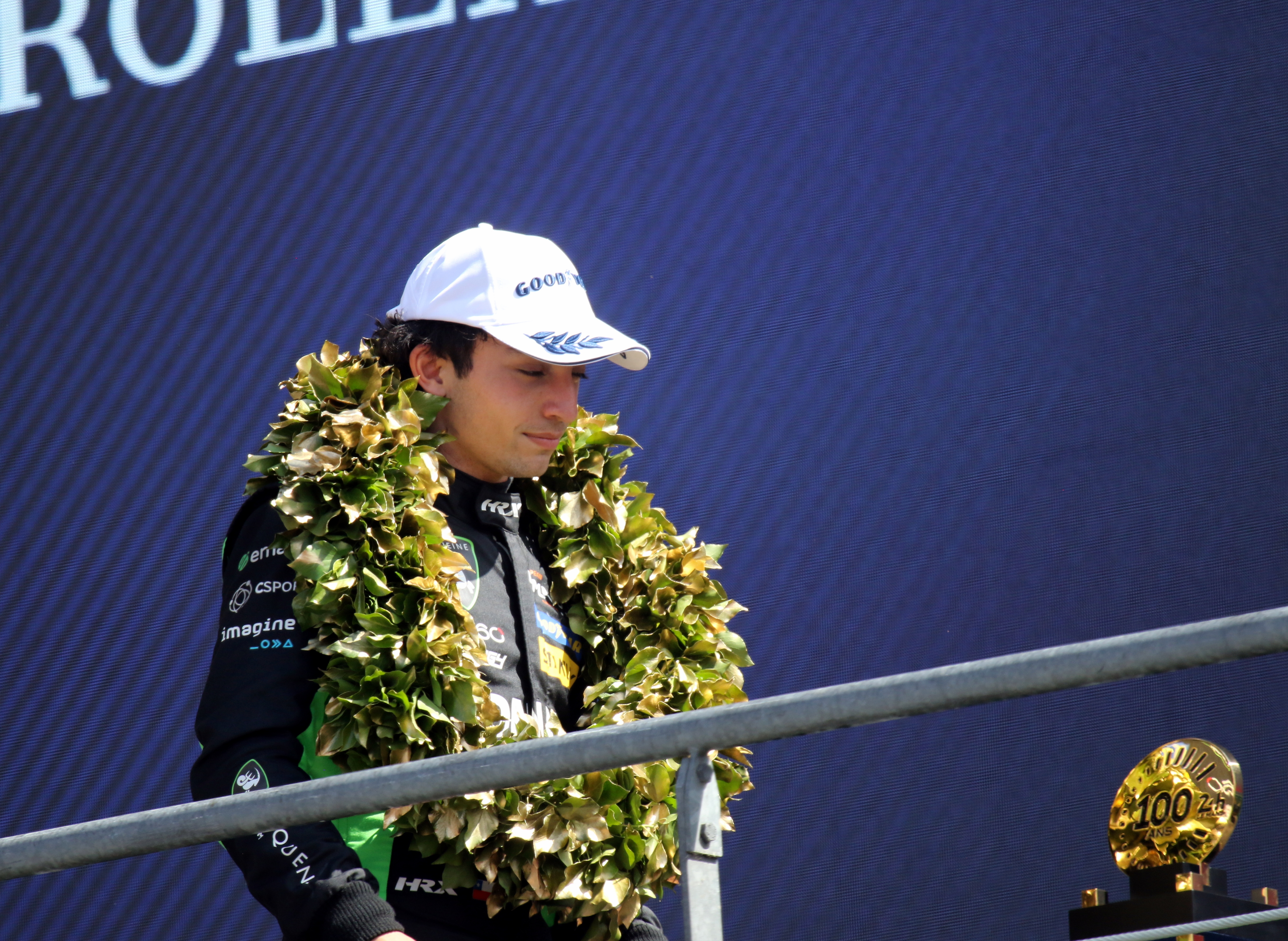
Pino on the podium of the 2023 24 Hours of Le Mans where he finished third in the LMP2 class

Pino split his attention between Europe and America during the summer, racing alongside René Binder and former WEC and Le Mans champion Neel Jani for Duqueine Team in the ELMS, whilst also partaking in the IMSA Michelin Endurance Cup rounds with Sean Creech Motorsport's LMP3 outfit. With two Pro class podiums in the former, Pino and his teammates secured fourth place in the standings; the latter series brought second-placed finishes at Daytona and Road America. Pino, Jani, and Binder also drove at the 24 Hours of Le Mans, where the team scored a class podium with third place.

=== 2024: WEC debut, ELMS & IMSA ===
In 2024, Pino made his debut in the FIA World Endurance Championship, competing in the newly-formed LMGT3 category for United Autosports. Additionally, he signed to race with Nielsen Racing in the European Le Mans Series and took the place of the re-ranked Alex Quinn in United's MEC lineup in IMSA. At the end of April, it was also announced that Pino had joined Stellantis Motorsport.

== Racing record ==
=== Racing career summary ===
Season	Series	Team	Races	Wins	Poles	F/Laps	Podiums	Points	Position
2019	Formula 4 South East Asia Championship	Meritus.GP	4	0	0	0	0	0	NC†
2020	F4 British Championship	Argenti Motorsport	12	0	0	0	0	14	14th
2021	Euroformula Open Championship	Drivex School	3	0	0	0	0	4	22nd
2021	European Le Mans Series - LMP3	Inter Europol Competition	2	0	0	0	0	8	28th
2021	Supercars Endurance GT4 South - GT4 Pro	Tockwith Motorsport	2	2	0	1	2	50	**2nd**
2022	Asian Le Mans Series - LMP3	Inter Europol Competition	4	0	0	0	0	36	7th
2022	European Le Mans Series - LMP3	Inter Europol Competition	6	3	0	0	3	79	**2nd**
2022	IMSA SportsCar Championship - LMP3	Performance Tech Motorsports	1	0	0	0	0	332	28th
2022	IMSA SportsCar Championship - LMP3	Sean Creech Motorsport	1	0	0	0	1	332	28th
2022	Le Mans Cup - LMP3	RLR MSport	2	0	0	0	0	0	NC†
2022	Euroformula Open Championship	Drivex School	8	0	0	0	0	20	14th
2023	Asian Le Mans Series - LMP2	ARC Bratislava	4	0	0	0	0	18	11th
2023	European Le Mans Series - LMP2	Duqueine Team	6	1	0	0	2	79	4th
2023	24 Hours of Le Mans - LMP2	Duqueine Team	1	0	0	0	1	N/A	**3rd**
2023	IMSA SportsCar Championship - LMP3	Sean Creech Motorsport	4	0	2	1	2	858	16th
2024	European Le Mans Series - LMP2	Nielsen Racing	3	0	0	0	0	0	23rd
2024	European Le Mans Series - LMP2	IDEC Sport	2	0	0	0	0	0	23rd
2024	IMSA SportsCar Championship - LMP2	United Autosports USA	5	0	0	0	0	1276	22nd
2024	FIA World Endurance Championship - LMGT3	United Autosports	8	0	1	0	1	36	18th
2024	24 Hours of Le Mans - LMGT3	United Autosports	1	0	0	0	0	N/A	DNF
2025	FIA World Endurance Championship - Hypercar	Proton Competition	8	0	0	0	0	1	27th
2025	24 Hours of Le Mans - Hypercar	Proton Competition	1	0	0	0	0	N/A	13rd
2025	IMSA SportsCar Championship - GTP	Proton Competition	3	0	0	0	0	705	26th
2026	IMSA SportsCar Championship - GTP	JDC–Miller MotorSports	2	0	0	0	0	518	26th
2026	European Endurance Prototype Cup	Cogemo Racing Team	3	0	0	0	0	1.75*	65th*

^{†} As Pino was a guest driver, he was ineligible to score points.
^{*} Season still in progress.

=== Complete Formula 4 South East Asia Championship results ===
(key) (Races in bold indicate pole position; races in italics indicate points for the fastest lap of top ten finishers)

Year	1	2	3	4	5	6	7	8	9	10	11	12	13	14	15	16	17	18	19	20	21	22	23	24	25	26	27	28	29	30	31	32	33	34	35	36	37	38	39	40	DC	Points
2019	SEP1; 1	SEP1; 2	SEP1; 3	SEP1; 4	SEP2; 1	SEP2; 2	SEP2; 3	SEP2; 4	BUR1; 1	BUR1; 2	BUR1; 3	BUR1; 4	BUR2; 1	BUR2; 2	BUR2; 3	BUR2; 4	MAD1; 1	MAD1; 2	MAD1; 3	MAD1; 4	MAD2; 1	MAD2; 2	MAD2; 3	MAD2; 4	SEP3; 1	SEP3; 2	SEP3; 3	SEP3; 4	SEP4; 1; 6	SEP4; 2; 6	SEP4; 3 Ret	SEP4; 4; 5	SEP5; 1	SEP5; 2	SEP5; 3	SEP5; 4	SEP6; 1	SEP6; 2	SEP6; 3	SEP6; 4	NC	-

=== Complete F4 British Championship results ===
(key) (Races in bold indicate pole position; races in italics indicate points for the fastest lap of top ten finishers)

Year	Entrant	1	2	3	4	5	6	7	8	9	10	11	12	13	14	15	16	17	18	19	20	21	22	23	24	25	26	DC	Points
2020	Argenti Motorsport	DON; 1; 10	DON; 2; 8	DON; 3; 11	BHGP; 1; 9	BHGP; 2; 10	BHGP; 3 Ret	OUL; 1; 11	OUL; 2; 8	OUL; 3; 10	KNO; 1; 10	KNO; 2; 12	KNO; 3; 11	THR; 1	THR; 2	THR; 3	SIL; 1	SIL; 2	SIL; 3	CRO; 1	CRO; 2	SNE; 1	SNE; 2	SNE; 3	BHI; 1	BHI; 2	BHI; 3	14th	14

=== Complete Euroformula Open Championship results ===
(key) (Races in bold indicate pole position; races in italics indicate points for the fastest lap of top ten finishers)

Year	Entrant	1	2	3	4	5	6	7	8	9	10	11	12	13	14	15	16	17	18	19	20	21	22	23	24	25	26	DC	Points
2021	Drivex School	POR; 1	POR; 2	POR; 3	LEC; 1	LEC; 2	LEC; 3	SPA; 1	SPA; 2	SPA; 3	HUN; 1	HUN; 2	HUN; 3	IMO; 1	IMO; 2	IMO; 3	RBR; 1	RBR; 2	RBR; 3	MNZ; 1; 8	MNZ; 2; 11	MNZ; 3 Ret	CAT; 1	CAT; 2	CAT; 3			22nd	4
2022	Drivex School	POR; 1; 10	POR; 2; 9	POR; 3; 11	PAU; 1 Ret	PAU; 2; 5	LEC; 1; 7	LEC; 2 Ret	LEC; 3 Ret	SPA; 1 WD	SPA; 2 WD	SPA; 3 WD	HUN; 1	HUN; 2	HUN; 3	IMO; 1	IMO; 2	IMO; 3	RBR; 1	RBR; 2	RBR; 3	MNZ; 1	MNZ; 2	MNZ; 3	CAT; 1	CAT; 2	CAT; 3	14th	20

=== Complete European Le Mans Series results ===
(key) (Races in bold indicate pole position; results in italics indicate fastest lap)

Year	Entrant	Class	Chassis	Engine	1	2	3	4	5	6	Rank	Points
2021	Inter Europol Competition	LMP3	Ligier JS P320	Nissan VK56DE 5.6L V8	CAT	RBR	LEC	MNZ	SPA; Ret	ALG; 7	28th	8
2022	Inter Europol Competition	LMP3	Ligier JS P320	Nissan VK56DE 5.6L V8	LEC; DSQ	IMO; 8	MNZ; 1	CAT; 1	SPA; 1	ALG; Ret	2nd	79
2023	Duqueine Team	LMP2	Oreca 07	Gibson GK428 4.2 L V8	CAT; 1	LEC; 2	ARA; 6	SPA; 6	POR; 5	ALG; 5	4th	79
2024	Nielsen Racing	LMP2	Oreca 07	Gibson GK428 4.2 L V8	CAT; 13	LEC; 11	IMO; 12	SPA			23rd	0
2024	IDEC Sport	LMP2	Oreca 07	Gibson GK428 4.2 L V8					MUG; Ret	ALG; 13	23rd	0

=== Complete WeatherTech SportsCar Championship results ===
(key) (Races in bold indicate pole position; results in italics indicate fastest lap)

Year	Team	Class	Make	Engine	1	2	3	4	5	6	7	8	9	Pos.	Points
2022	Performance Tech Motorsports	LMP3	Ligier JS P320	Nissan VK56DE 5.6 L V8	DAY; 7	SEB	MDO	WGL	MOS	ELK				28th	332
2022	Sean Creech Motorsport	LMP3	Ligier JS P320	Nissan VK56DE 5.6 L V8							PET; 3			28th	332
2023	Sean Creech Motorsport	LMP3	Ligier JS P320	Nissan VK56DE 5.6 L V8	**DAY**; 2	SEB; 7	WGL; 7	MOS	**ELK**; 2	IMS	PET			16th	858
2024	United Autosports USA	LMP2	Oreca 07	Gibson GK428 V8	**DAY**; 6	SEB; 10	WGL; 8	MOS	ELK	IMS; 9	**PET**; 10			22nd	1276
2025	Proton Competition	GTP	Porsche 963	Porsche 9RD 4.6 L Turbo V8	DAY; 10	SEB; 6	LBH	LGA	DET	WGL; 13	ELK	IMS	PET	18th	914
2026	JDC–Miller MotorSports	GTP	Porsche 963	Porsche 9RD 4.6 L Turbo V8	DAY; 7	SEB; 8	LBH	LGA	DET	WGL	ELK	IMS	PET	26th	518

=== Complete 24 Hours of Le Mans results ===
Year	Team	Co-Drivers	Car	Class	Laps	Pos.	Class Pos.
2023	(France) Duqueine Team	(Austria) René Binder (Switzerland) Neel Jani	Oreca 07-Gibson	LMP2	327	11th	**3rd**
2024	(United Kingdom) United Autosports	(Japan) Hiroshi Hamaguchi (Japan) Marino Sato	McLaren 720S GT3 Evo	LMGT3	212	DNF	DNF
2025	(Germany) Proton Competition	(Switzerland) Neel Jani (Argentina) Nicolás Varrone	Porsche 963	Hypercar	383	13th	13th

=== Complete FIA World Endurance Championship results ===
(key) (Races in bold indicate pole position) (Races in italics indicate fastest lap)

Year	Entrant	Class	Car	Engine	1	2	3	4	5	6	7	8	Rank	Points
2024	United Autosports	LMGT3	McLaren 720S GT3 Evo	McLaren M840T 4.0 L Turbo V8	QAT; 13	IMO; 6	SPA; Ret	LMS; Ret	SÃO; 3	COA; 7	FUJ; 17	**BHR**; 8	18th	36
2025	Proton Competition	Hypercar	Porsche 963	Porsche 4.6 L Turbo V8	QAT; 15	IMO; 14	SPA; Ret	LMS; 12	SÃO; 10	COA; 13	FUJ; 12	BHR; 17	27th	1

^{*} Season still in progress.
