= Lyubov Ozeretskovskaya =

Kazakhstani racing driver

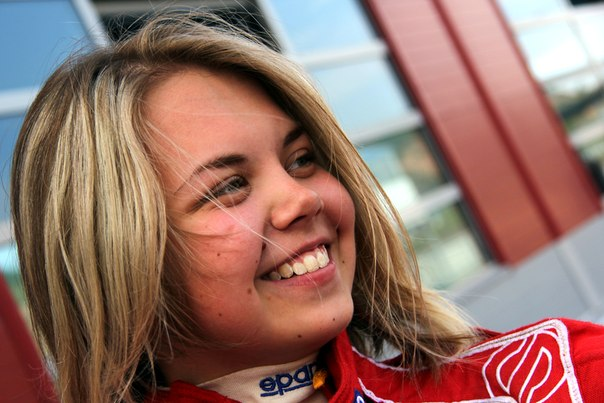
- Ozeretskovskaya in 2014
- Nationality: Kazakhstani
- Born: 21 November 1996 (age 29) Almaty, Kazakhstan

Formula 4 SEA Championship career
- Debut season: 2019
- Car number: 46
- Starts: 8
- Wins: 0
- Poles: 1
- Fastest laps: 0
- Best finish: 17th in 2019

Lyubov Daniilovna Ozeretskovskaya (née Andreyeva, born 21 November 1996) is a female racing driver and sim racer from Kazakhstan.

== Career ==
Having started her career in karting in her native Kazakhstan, Andreyeva moved to Russia to contest the local Formula Masters championship in 2014. She twinned her Formula Masters campaign with several outings in the Formula BMW AsiaCup series in 2015, before cutting back to Formula Masters only from 2016. She contested one final season in 2017 before running out of funding, turning to modelling as well as promoting sim racing events and products.

Married in late 2018, Ozeretskovskaya was accepted into the 2019 W Series evaluation but failed to make the grid. She competed in the first two rounds of the 2019 Formula 4 South East Asia Championship, but sat out the remainder of the season recovering from foot surgery having scored a best finish of seventh in Sepang.

Ozeretskovskaya gave up circuit racing at the end of 2019, moving into eSports and becoming an iRacing–focused Twitch streamer. Ozeretskovskaya returned to Kazakhstan in 2022 during the Russo-Ukrainian War.

== Racing record ==
=== Career summary ===
| Season | Series | Team | Races | Wins | Poles | F/Laps | Podiums | Points | Position |
|---|---|---|---|---|---|---|---|---|---|
| 2014 | Formula Masters Russia^{(Russian)} | Astana Motorsports | 13 | 0 | 0 | 0 | 0 | 58 | 7th |
| 2015 | Formula Masters Russia^{(Russian)} | Astana Motorsports | 21 | 0 | 0 | 0 | 5 | 565 | 4th |
| 2019 | Formula 4 South East Asia Championship | Meritus Grand Prix | 8 | 0 | 1 | 0 | 0 | 31 | 17th |
