= Sneha Sharma =

Indian racing driver (born 1990)

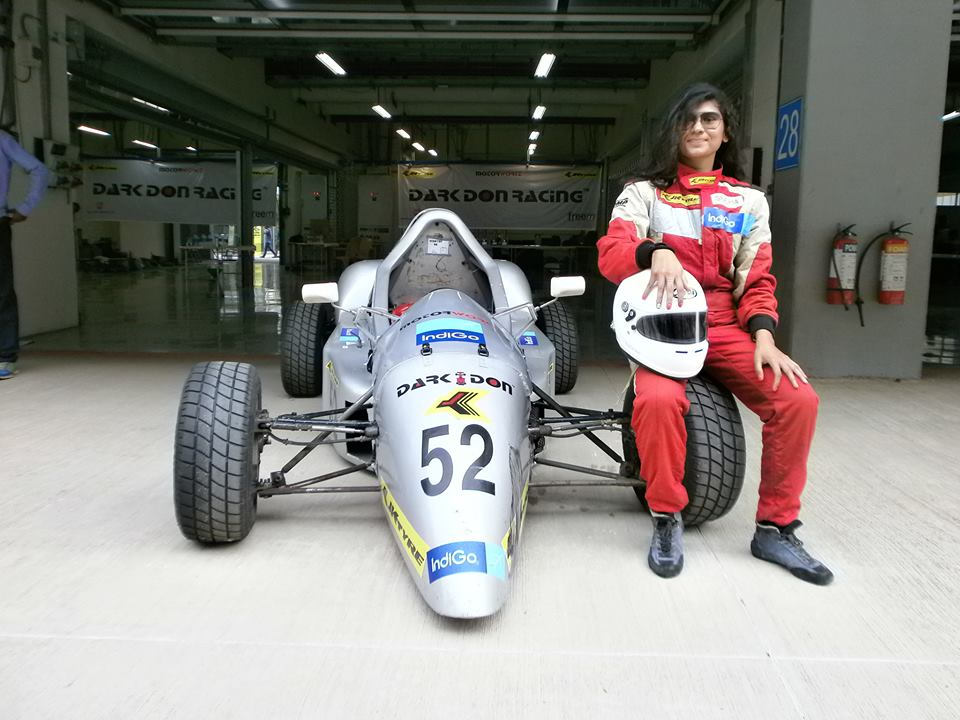
- Nationality: (India) Indian
- Born: 1 August 1990 (age 36) Kolkata, West Bengal, India

(formula 3 ) career

Sneha Sharma (born 1 August 1990) is an Indian racing driver who competes in Formula 4 National Racing Championship, she is also professionally a Pilot with Vistara Airlines (since 2022). Sneha was born in Kolkata however, since childhood she has been raised in Mumbai, she did her education from the Canossa Convent School in Andheri, Mumbai and flying training from San Francisco, Miami in US and Kuala Lumpur in Malaysia.

== Racing career ==
Sharma has been racing since the age of sixteen. At the age of seventeen, she raced in the MRF National karting championship while pursuing her high school and flying studies. In 2010, she graduated to cars from karts and has also competed in the JK Tyre National racing Championship. Sharma secured a second position in her 4-stroke category at the JK Tyre National Karting Championship 2009 and was also the only girl to qualify for the final round of the KCT of the MAI National Karting Championship. She was shortlisted for the 2015 Volkswagen Vento Cup and The Toyota Etios Cup in India. Sharma was given the title of India's fastest female Racer after securing a top-five position in the Mercedes young star driver program. Because of not having a sponsor or a strong economic background, the teachers who taught her about basics of braking and cornering were simple mechanics and Sneha has performed various jobs at the race track to subsidise her racing fee. As of today Sneha receives sponsorship for her racing career from JK Tyre and Indigo airlines. Currently, in various categories, Sneha has won over all, six race victories and 14 runner up positions.

In 2019, Sharma attempted to qualify for a W Series, but failed to progress beyond the evaluation day.

== Racing record ==
=== Career summary ===
Season	Series	Team	Races	Wins	Poles	F/Laps	Podiums	Points	Position
2019	F4 South East Asia Championship	Meritus.GP	36	0	0	0	0	91	10th
