= Lucca Allen =

Irish racing driver (born 2002)

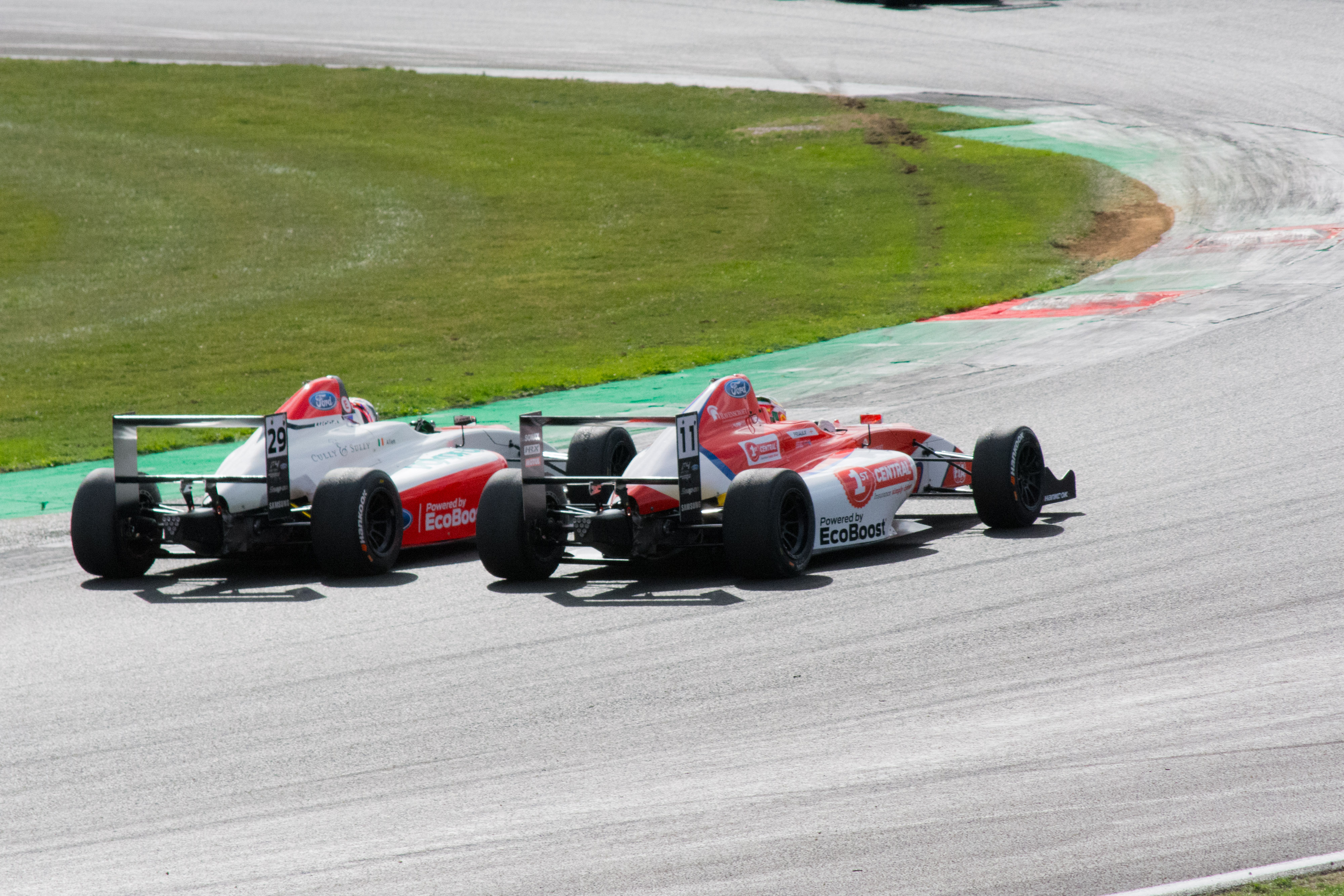
- Allen (left) in 2018
- Nationality: (Republic of Ireland) Irish
- Born: 29 June 2002 (age 24) Cork, Ireland
- Relatives: Rachel Allen (mother)

Le Mans Cup career
- Debut season: 2023
- Current team: Graff Racing
- Categorisation: FIA Silver

Previous series
- 2022 2021 2020–2021 2018–2019 2017–2018: Ultimate Cup Endurance Series; Formula Regional Japanese Championship; Super Formula Lights; Formula 4 South East Asia Championship; F4 British Championship

Championship titles
- 2019: Formula 4 South East Asia Championship

Lucca Allen (born 29 June 2002) is an Irish racing driver who last competed in the Le Mans Cup with Graff Racing. He was champion of the Formula 4 South East Asia Championship in 2019, and previously competed in Super Formula Lights.

== Racing career ==
=== Karting ===
Born in Cork, Allen started his karting career in 2011. He quickly proved his speed, competing for Ireland in the Karting World Championship in 2014 against the likes of Enaam Ahmed and Mick Schumacher. Allen once again raced for Ireland in the Karting World Championship in 2016, a year in which he also became Irish Karting Champion.

=== F4 ===
Allen signed on with Fortec Motorsports to compete full-time in 2018. Allen scored 29 points and finished 14th in the championship, whilst also making his F4 SEA Championship debut, scoring one podium in Sepang.

Allen was fully committed to the F4 SEA Championship in 2019. Allen won the championship by one point to Finnish driver Elias Seppänen, with 640 points and twelve race victories to his name.

=== Super Formula Lights ===
In January 2020, ALBIREX Racing announced that Allen would take part in the inaugural season of the Japanese Super Formula Lights series. However, due to COVID-19 travel restrictions, Allen was unable to compete in the first three rounds of the championship at Motegi, Okayama and Sportsland SUGO. He made his series debut at Autopolis and scored a total of five points, helping him to finish ninth in the drivers' championship despite only participating in three rounds.

=== Endurance racing ===
In 2022, Allen made his first foray into endurance racing. Having originally been scheduled to drive for AF2 Motorsport in the Michelin Le Mans Cup, Allen ended up competing in the Ultimate Cup Series for Graff Racing, racing in the Prototype Challenge. The Irishman won the championship in convincing fashion, having won five out of six races. Allen would eventually return to the Le Mans Cup in 2023, driving alongside James Sweetnam for Graff.

== Other ventures ==
Allen hails from a family of Irish chefs. He is the son of celebrity chef Rachel Allen, known for her appearances on RTÉ; his grandmother is the food writer Darina Allen, who operates the Ballymaloe Cookery School; and his great-grandmother was Michelin star-winning head chef Myrtle Allen. Allen worked in the family farm shop while growing up, and in 2024 he began working in the farm shop at Jeremy Clarkson's Diddly Squat Farm to raise money to support his motorsport career. Allen subsequently featured in series 3 and 5 of Clarkson's Farm, cooking in the kitchen at the farm and showing Clarkson how to prepare nettle soup from stinging nettles grown on site.

== Karting record ==
=== Karting career summary ===
Season	Series	Team	Position
2014	IRL Championship - Cadet		
2016	Super One Series - OK Junior		13th

== Racing record ==
=== Racing career summary ===
Season	Series	Team	Races	Wins	Poles	F/Laps	Podiums	Points	Position
2017	F4 British Championship	Falcon Motorsport	15	0	0	0	0	0	22nd
2018	F4 British Championship	Fortec Motorsports	27	0	0	0	0	29	14th
2018	F4 SEA Championship	Meritus.GP	6	0	0	0	1	52	12th
2019	F4 SEA Championship	Meritus.GP	40	12	6	9	28	640	**1st**
2019	FIA Motorsport Games Formula 4 Cup	Team Ireland	2	0	0	0	0	N/A	8th
2020	Super Formula Lights	ALBIREX Racing	9	0	0	0	0	5	9th
2021	Super Formula Lights	ALBIREX Racing	3	0	0	0	0	1	11th
2021	Formula Regional Japanese Championship	Sutekina Racing Team	3	0	0	0	0	21	16th
2022	Ultimate Cup Series - Proto P3	Graff Racing	6	5	6	4	6	173	**1st**
2023	Le Mans Cup - LMP3	Graff Racing	3	0	1	0	0	2	29th
2024	F4 Saudi Arabian Championship	Altawkilat Meritus.GP	1	0	0	0	0	0	NC†
2024	Porsche Carrera Cup Great Britain - Pro-Am	Eden Race Drive	2	0	0	0	0	0	NC†

† As Allen was a guest driver, he was ineligible for points.

=== Complete F4 British Championship results ===
(key) (Races in bold indicate pole position) (Races in italics indicate fastest lap)

Year	Team	1	2	3	4	5	6	7	8	9	10	11	12	13	14	15	16	17	18	19	20	21	22	23	24	25	26	27	28	29	30	31	Pos	Points
2017	Falcon Motorsport	BRI; 1	BRI; 2	BRI; 3	DON; 1	DON; 2	DON; 3	THR; 1	THR; 2	THR; 3	OUL; 1	OUL; 2	OUL; 3	CRO; 1	CRO; 2	CRO; 3	SNE; 1; 13	SNE; 2; 16	SNE; 3; 16	KNO; 1; 13	KNO; 2 DNP	KNO; 3 Ret	KNO; 4; 14	ROC; 1; 14	ROC; 2; 11	ROC; 3; 13	SIL; 1; 14	SIL; 2; 13	SIL; 3; 11	BHGP; 1; 14	BHGP; 2; 12	BHGP; 3 Ret	22nd	0
2018	Fortec Motorsports	BRI; 1; 10	BRI; 2; 8	BRI; 3 Ret	DON; 1; 8	DON; 2; 11	DON; 3 Ret	THR; 1; 8	THR; 2; 11	THR; 3; 10	OUL; 1; 12	OUL; 2; 10	OUL; 3; 11	CRO; 1; 12	CRO; 2; 10	CRO; 3; 10	SNE; 1 Ret	SNE; 2; 10	SNE; 3; 8	ROC; 1; 13	ROC; 2; 10	ROC; 3; 11	KNO; 1	KNO; 2	KNO; 3	SIL; 1; 10	SIL; 2 Ret	SIL; 3; 9	BHGP; 1; 9	BHGP; 2; 10	BHGP; 3 Ret		14th	29

=== Complete F4 SEA Championship results ===
(key) (Races in bold indicate pole position) (Races in italics indicate fastest lap)

Year	1	2	3	4	5	6	7	8	9	10	11	12	13	14	15	16	17	18	19	20	21	22	23	24	25	26	27	28	29	30	31	32	33	34	35	36	37	38	39	40	Pos	Points
2018	SEP1; 1	SEP1; 2	SEP1; 3	SEP2; 1	SEP2; 2	SEP2; 3	MAD1; 1	MAD1; 2	MAD1; 3	MAD2; 1	MAD2; 2	MAD2; 3	CHA1; 1	CHA1; 2	CHA1; 3	CHA2; 1	CHA2; 2	CHA2; 3	SEP3; 1 Ret	SEP3; 2; 2	SEP3; 3; 6	SEP4; 1; 6	SEP4; 2; 5	SEP4; 3; 6																	12th	52
2019	SEP1; 1; 2	SEP1; 2; 2	SEP1; 3; 3	SEP1; 4; 2	SEP2; 1; 1	SEP2; 2; 5	SEP2; 3; 1	SEP2; 4; 3	**BUR1**; **1**; 5	BUR1; 2; 1	BUR1; 3; 3	**BUR1**; **4**; 1	BUR2; 1; 1	BUR2; 2 Ret	BUR2; 3; 9	**BUR2**; **4**; 1	MAD1; 1; 3	MAD1; 2; 6	MAD1; 3; 4	MAD1; 4; 2	**MAD2**; **1**; 7	MAD2; 2; 5	**MAD2**; **3**; 1	**MAD2**; **4**; 1	SEP3; 1; 4	SEP3; 2; 3	SEP3; 3 Ret	SEP3; 4; 3	SEP4; 1; 3	SEP4; 2; 2	SEP4; 3 Ret	SEP4; 4; 2	SEP5; 1; 1	SEP5; 2; 1	SEP5; 3; 1	SEP5; 4; 2	SEP6; 1; 2	SEP6; 2; 1	SEP6; 3; 4	SEP6; 4; 5	1st	640

=== Complete FIA Motorsport Games results ===
Year	Entrant	Cup	Qualifying	Quali Race	Main race
2019	(Republic of Ireland) Team Ireland	**Formula 4**	15th	11th	8th

=== Complete Super Formula Lights results ===
(key) (Races in bold indicate pole position) (Races in italics indicate fastest lap)

Year	Entrant	1	2	3	4	5	6	7	8	9	10	11	12	13	14	15	16	17	18	Pos	Points
2020	ALBIREX Racing	MOT; 1	MOT; 2	MOT; 3	OKA; 1	OKA; 2	SUG; 1	SUG; 2	SUG; 3	AUT; 1; 6	AUT; 2; 6	AUT; 3 Ret	SUZ; 1; 6	SUZ; 2 Ret	SUZ; 3; 6	FUJ; 1; 6	FUJ; 2; 7	FUJ; 3; 8		9th	5
2021	ALBIREX Racing	FUJ; 1 WD	FUJ; 2 WD	FUJ; 3 WD	SUZ; 1 WD	SUZ; 2 WD	SUZ; 3 WD	AUT; 1	AUT; 2	AUT; 3	SUG; 1; 11	SUG; 2; 6	SUG; 3; 8	MOT1; 1	MOT1; 2	MOT1; 3	MOT2; 1	MOT2; 2	MOT2; 3	11th	1

^{†} Driver did not finish the race, but was classified as he completed over 90% of the race distance.

=== Complete Formula Regional Japanese Championship results ===
(key) (Races in bold indicate pole position) (Races in italics indicate fastest lap)

Year	Entrant	1	2	3	4	5	6	7	8	9	10	11	12	13	Pos	Points
2021	Sutekina Racing Team	OKA; 1; 6	OKA; 2; 4	OKA; 3; 10	MOT; 1	MOT; 2	MOT; 3	FUJ; 1	FUJ; 2	FUJ; 3	SUG; 1	SUG; 2	SUZ; 1	SUZ; 2	15th	21

Sporting positions
Preceded by Alessandro Ghiretti	Formula 4 South East Asia Championship; Champion; 2019	Succeeded by Jack Beeton
