= 2023 IMSA SportsCar Weekend =

Eighth round of the 2023 IMSA SportsCar Championship season

Track map of Road America

The 2023 IMSA SportsCar Weekend was a sports car race sanctioned by the International Motor Sports Association (IMSA). The race was held at Road America in Elkhart Lake, Wisconsin on August 6, 2023. The event was the eighth round of the 2023 IMSA SportsCar Championship, and the fifth round of the WeatherTech Sprint Cup.

The No. 31 Cadillac of Pipo Derani qualified in pole position by recording the fastest lap in qualifying, but started at the back of the GTP field after his car crashed in warm up. This allowed the No. 7 Porsche of Matt Campbell and Felipe Nasr to start from first position. The car kept the lead through the following sequence of pit stops and Nasr drove the Porsche across the start/finish line at the end of the race to claim his ninth SportsCar Championship victory and Campbell's eleventh. Meyer Shank Racing 's No. 60 car of Tom Blomqvist and Colin Braun finished second ahead and the No. 10 Wayne Taylor Racing car of Filipe Albuquerque and Ricky Taylor took third.

The Le Mans Prototype 2 (LMP2) category was won by the No. 52 PR1/Mathiasen Motorsports car of Ben Keating and Paul-Loup Chatin with Giedo van der Garde and John Falb in TDS Racing's No. 35 in second. Josh Burdon and Gar Robinson took victory in LMP3. Burdon took the lead in the closing stages and earned him his fourth SportsCar Championship victory and Robinson's eleventh. Ross Gunn and Alex Riberas took their second consecutive win in GTD Pro of the season ahead of Ben Barnicoat and Jack Hawksworth in the No. 14 Lexus. Bryan Sellers and Madison Snow were unchallenged throughout the race and took their fourth win of the season in GTD, ahead of The No. 70 Inception Racing car of Brendan Iribe and Frederik Schandorff.

The result meant Albuquerque and Taylor became the leaders of the Drivers' Championship with 2171 points, 18 ahead of sixth-placed finishers Derani and Sims and a further 59 points in front of Connor De Phillippi and Nick Yelloly. Nick Tandy and Mathieu Jaminet retained fourth place and Tom Blomqvist and Colin Braun rounded out the top five. Cadillac remained in the lead of the Manufactures' Championship with 2414 points, 35 in front of their nearest rival Acura in second followed by Porsche in third, and a further 27 ahead of BMW with three races left in the season.

== Background ==
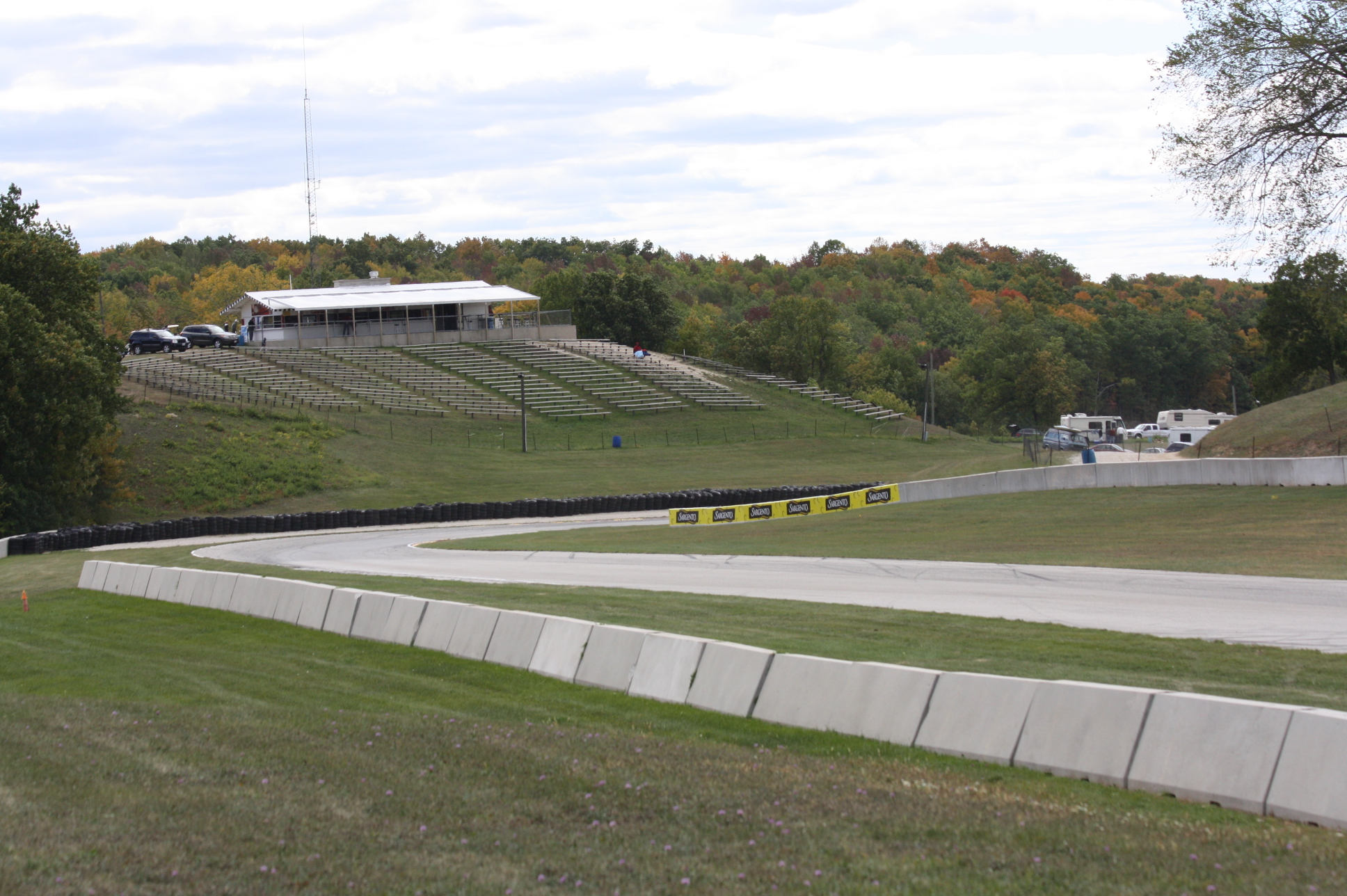
Road America, where the race was held.

International Motor Sports Association's (IMSA) president John Doonan confirmed the race was part of the schedule for the 2023 IMSA SportsCar Championship (IMSA SCC) in August 2022. It was the tenth consecutive year the event will be held as part of the WeatherTech SportsCar Championship. The 2023 IMSA SportsCar Weekend was the eighth of eleven scheduled sports car races of 2023 by IMSA, and it was the fifth round held as part of the WeatherTech Sprint Cup. The race was held at the fourteen-turn 4.048 mi (6.515 km) Road America on August 6, 2023.

Breaking tradition, IMSA didn't hold their "State of the Series" annual press conference during the Road America race weekend. IMSA moved it to the Michelin Raceway Road Atlanta race weekend.

After the 2022 season, the venue was renovated. Drainage areas were upgraded, the pitlane was paved, and the track was resurfaced.

On July 27, 2023, released the latest technical bulletin outlining Balance of Performance for the event. In GTP, The Acura ARX-06 received a 2 kilogram weight reduction whereas the BMW M Hybrid V8 and Porsche 963 were given weight reductions of 1 kilogram each. The Cadillac V-Series.R remained at 1030 kilograms while all the GTP cars received increases in energy. In GTD Pro and GTD, The Mercedes-AMG GT3 Evo received a 10 kilogram weight reduction while the Acura NSX GT3 Evo22 received a fuel capacity increase of 3 liters.

Before the race, Pipo Derani and Alexander Sims led the GTP Drivers' Championship with 1872 points, ahead of Connor De Phillippi and Nick Yelloly in second with 1862 points, and Filipe Albuquerque and Ricky Taylor in third. With 973 points, Ben Hanley and George Kurtz led the LMP2 Drivers' Championship, 3 points ahead of Mikkel Jensen and Steven Thomas in second. In LMP3, Felipe Fraga and Gar Robinson led the Drivers' Championship with a 181-point advantage over Wayne Boyd and Anthony Mantella. Ben Barnicoat and Jack Hawksworth led the GTD Pro Drivers' Championship with 2462 points, ahead of Antonio García and Jordan Taylor with 2311 points. In GTD, the Drivers' Championship was led by Bryan Sellers and Madison Snow with 2226 points, ahead of Roman De Angelis and Marco Sørensen with 2140 points. Cadillac, Lexus, and BMW were leading their respective Manufacturers' Championships, while Whelen Engineering Racing, CrowdStrike Racing by APR, Riley Motorsports, Vasser Sullivan Racing, and Paul Miller Racing each led their own Teams' Championships.

=== Entries ===
A total of 45 cars took part in the event split across five classes. 10 cars were entered in GTP, 7 in LMP2, 8 in LMP3, 5 in GTD Pro, and 15 in GTD. In GTP, Proton Competition would debut their Porsche 963. In LMP2, Rick Ware Racing were absent. Rodrigo Sales joined Louis Delétraz in the Tower Motorsports entry. In LMP3, JDC-Miller MotorSports returned after missing the Canadian Tire Motorsport Park round while Andretti Autosport were absent. Jr III Motorsports added a second entry. Josh Burdon substituted for Felipe Fraga in the Riley Motorsports entry due to a clash with the Stock Car Pro Series round at Autódromo Velo Città. Colin Noble substituted for Linus Lundqvist in the No. 29 Jr III Motorsports entry due to a clash with the IndyCar Series round at Nashville Street Circuit. Nico Pino substituted for Lance Willsey in the Sean Creech Motorsport entry. Gerry Kraut joined Scott Andrews in the No. 85 JDC-Miller MotorSports entry. In GTD, Racers Edge Motorsports with WTR Andretti made their first sprint appearance since Long Beach. Andretti Autosport withdrew from the event. David Brule returned to the No. 92 Kelly-Moss with Riley entry.

== Practice ==
There were two practice sessions preceding the start of the race on Sunday, both on Friday. The first session will last 90 minutes on Friday morning while the second session will last 75 minutes on Friday afternoon.

In the first session, Sébastien Bourdais' No. 01 Cadillac lapped quickest with a lap time of 1:49.538, 0.054 seconds faster than Pipo Derani. Augusto Farfus was third in BMW's No. 24 car. Tom Blomqvist placed the No. 60 MSR Acura fourth. Mikkel Jensen's No. 11 TDS Racing car led LMP2 with a time of 1:52.812, followed by Ryan Dalziel's No. 18 Era Motorsport car. LMP3 was led by Jr III Racing's No. 30 Ligier, driven by Garett Grist, with a 1:59.030 lap. Alex Riberas was fastest in GTD Pro while Sebastian Priaulx set the fastest time amongst all GTD cars. The session was red flagged five times for on-track incidents. Giedo van der Garde crashed the No. 35 TDS Racing Oreca at the Carousel. 15 minutes later, the No. 6 Porsche Penske Motorsport Porsche 963 of Mathieu Jaminet went straight on at turn 3 and crashed. Debris scattered across turn 13 and Jaminet's Porsche suffered nose damage and brought out the second red flag. Misha Goikhberg in the No. 78 Forte Racing powered by US RaceTronics crashed heavily at turn 13. 10 minutes later, the rear window from the No. 12 Vasser Sullivan Racing Lexus blew off the car and landed at turn 12. The final stoppage came when David Brule, driving the No. 92 car for Kelly-Moss with Riley, spun at turn 3 and skidded through the gravel trap and hit the barriers.

Derani led the final session in the No. 31 WER Cadillac with a lap of 1 minute, 47.986 seconds. Bourdais' No. 01 Cadillac was second-fastest. Ricky Taylor was third in WTR's No. 10 Acura. De Phillippi and his teammate Farfus were fourth and fifth for BMW. Dalziel led LMP2 with a 1:52.244 lap in Era Motorsport's car. Grist led LMP3 in Jr III Racing's No. 30 Ligier with a 1:58.069 lap. The GTD Pro class was topped by the No. 3 Corvette Racing Chevrolet Corvette C8.R GTD of Jordan Taylor with a time of 2:03.712. Mikaël Grenier set the fastest time in GTD. The session was red flagged three times for on-track accidents. 10 minutes into the session, Steven Thomas crashed the No. 11 TDS Racing Oreca at the Carousel. The No. 77 Wright Motorsports Porsche 911 GT3 R (992) of Alan Brynjolfsson spun at turn 11 and tagged the wall. The final stoppage came when Mike Skeen, driving the No. 32 car for Team Korthoff Motorsports, crashed heavily at turn 11 and Skeen's Mercedes lost a left rear wheel. Due to damage sustained in opening practice, the No. 35 TDS Racing and No. 78 Forte Racing powered by US RaceTronics entries did not participate in the session.

== Qualifying ==
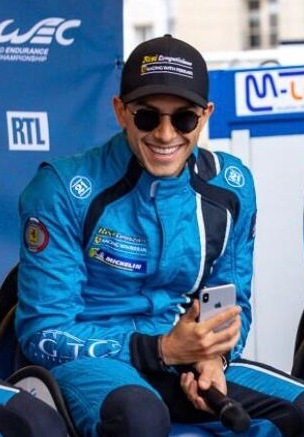
Pipo Derani (pictured in 2019) helped take the No. 31 Cadillac's second pole position of 2023.

Sunday's afternoon qualifying was broken into four sessions, with one session for the GTP, LMP2 and LMP3, GTD Pro and GTD classes, which lasted for 20 minutes for the GTP session, and 15 minutes for the LMP2/LMP3, and GTD Pro/GTD sessions. The rules dictated that all teams nominated a driver to qualify their cars, with the Pro-Am LMP2 class requiring a Bronze rated driver to qualify the car while the LMP3 class required a Bronze/Silver Rated driver to qualify the car. The competitors' fastest lap times determined the starting order. IMSA then arranged the grid to put GTPs ahead of the LMP2, LMP3, GTD Pro, and GTD cars.

The first was for cars in the GTD Pro and GTD classes. Alex Riberas qualified on pole in GTD Pro driving the No. 23 car for Heart of Racing Team, beating Daniel Juncadella in the No. 79 WeatherTech Racing entry by 0.057 seconds. Following in third was Jordan Taylor's No. 3 Corvette while the No. 14 Vasser Sullivan Racing Lexus and No. 9 Pfaff Motorsports Porsche rounded out the GTD Pro qualifiers. Madison Snow qualified on pole in GTD driving the No. 1 Paul Miller Racing car. Snow was 0.091 seconds clear of Brendan Iribe in the No. 70 Inception Racing McLaren followed by Frankie Montecalvo in the No. 12 Lexus in third.

The second session was for cars in the LMP2 and LMP3 classes. George Kurtz qualified on pole in LMP2 driving the No. 04 car for CrowdStrike Racing by APR. Kurtz was 0.508 seconds clear of Rodrigo Sales in the No. 8 Tower Motorsports car followed by Steven Thomas in the No. 11 TDS Racing entry. Keating locked up at turn eight on his second and third laps and could only manage fourth position. Dwight Merriman rounded out the top five in the No. 18 Era Motorsport entry. Nico Pino qualified on pole in LMP3 driving the No. 33 car for Sean Creech Motorsport, besting Bijoy Garg in the No. 29 Jr III Motorsports entry. Just after setting his fastest lap, Pino's Ligier caught air at the exit of turn one after his car launched off the curb. Gar Robinson was third in the No. 74 Riley Motorsports entry followed by Orey Fidani in the No. 13 AWA Duqueine, and Seth Lucas rounded out the top five.

The final session of qualifying was for the GTP class. Pipo Derani qualified on pole driving the No. 31 car for Whelen Engineering Racing, beating Matt Campbell in the No. 7 Porsche Penske Motorsport entry by less than one-tenth of a second. Following in third was the No. 01 Cadillac of Sébastien Bourdais, with the No. 10 Acura of Filipe Albuquerque in fourth. Connor De Phillippi completed the top five in the No. 25 BMW followed by Colin Braun's No. 60 Acura in sixth, and Nick Tandy in the No. 6 Porsche Penske Motorsport entry in seventh. The No. 24 BMW M Team RLL entry, JDC-Miller MotorSports and Proton Competition Porsche 963's rounded out the GTP qualifiers.

=== Qualifying results ===
Pole positions in each class are indicated in bold and by ‡.

Pos.	Class	No.	Team	Driver	Time	Gap	Grid
1	**GTP**	**31**	**(United States) Whelen Engineering Racing**	**(Brazil) Pipo Derani**	**1:47.730**	**_**	1‡
2	GTP	7	(Germany) Porsche Penske Motorsport	(Australia) Matt Campbell	1:47.798	+0.068	2
3	GTP	01	(United States) Cadillac Racing	(France) Sébastien Bourdais	1:48.036	+0.306	3
4	GTP	10	(United States) Wayne Taylor Racing with Andretti Autosport	(Portugal) Filipe Albuquerque	1:48.156	+0.426	4
5	GTP	25	(United States) BMW M Team RLL	(United States) Connor De Phillippi	1:48.219	+0.489	5
6	GTP	60	(United States) Meyer Shank Racing with Curb-Agajanian	(United States) Colin Braun	1:48.228	+0.498	6
7	GTP	6	(Germany) Porsche Penske Motorsport	(United Kingdom) Nick Tandy	1:48.332	+0.602	7
8	GTP	24	(United States) BMW M Team RLL	(Austria) Philipp Eng	1:48.835	+1.105	8
9	GTP	5	(United States) JDC-Miller MotorSports	(Germany) Mike Rockenfeller	1:49.212	+1.482	9
10	GTP	59	(Germany) Proton Competition	(Italy) Gianmaria Bruni	1:49.460	+1.730	10
11	**LMP2**	**04**	**(United States) CrowdStrike Racing by APR**	**(United States) George Kurtz**	**1:53.621**	**+5.891**	11‡
12	LMP2	8	(United States) Tower Motorsports	(United States) Rodrigo Sales	1:54.129	+6.399	12
13	LMP2	11	(France) TDS Racing	(United States) Steven Thomas	1:54.296	+6.566	13
14	LMP2	52	(United States) PR1/Mathiasen Motorsports	(United States) Ben Keating	1:54.785	+7.055	14
15	LMP2	18	(United States) Era Motorsport	(United States) Dwight Merriman	1:54.870	+7.140	15
16	LMP2	20	(Denmark) High Class Racing	(Denmark) Dennis Andersen	1:55.642	+7.912	16
17	LMP2	35	(France) TDS Racing	(United States) John Falb	1:57.126	+9.396	17
18	**LMP3**	**33**	**(United States) Sean Creech Motorsport**	**(Chile) Nico Pino**	**1:57.930**	**+10.200**	18‡
19	LMP3	29	(United States) Jr III Motorsports	(United States) Bijoy Garg	1:58.860	+11.130	19
20	LMP3	74	(United States) Riley Motorsports	(United States) Gar Robinson	1:59.224	+11.494	20
21	LMP3	13	(Canada) AWA	(Canada) Orey Fidani	1:59.251	+11.521	21
22	LMP3	4	(United States) Ave Motorsports	(United States) Seth Lucas	2:00.609	+12.879	22
23	LMP3	30	(United States) Jr III Motorsports	(United States) Ari Balogh	2:00.618	+12.888	23
24	LMP3	17	(Canada) AWA	(Canada) Anthony Mantella	2:01.588	+13.858	24
25	LMP3	85	(United States) JDC-Miller MotorSports	(United States) Gerry Kraut	2:01.907	+14.177	25
26	**GTD Pro**	**23**	**(United States) Heart of Racing Team**	**(Spain) Alex Riberas**	**2:02.918**	**+15.188**	26‡
27	GTD Pro	79	(United States) WeatherTech Racing	(Spain) Daniel Juncadella	2:02.975	+15.245	27
28	GTD Pro	3	(United States) Corvette Racing	(United States) Jordan Taylor	2:03.143	+15.413	28
29	**GTD**	**1**	**(United States) Paul Miller Racing**	**(United States) Madison Snow**	**2:03.291**	**+15.561**	29‡
30	GTD Pro	14	(United States) Vasser Sullivan Racing	(United Kingdom) Jack Hawksworth	2:03.354	+15.624	30
31	GTD	70	(United Kingdom) Inception Racing	(United States) Brendan Iribe	2:03.382	+15.652	31
32	GTD Pro	9	(Canada) Pfaff Motorsports	(Austria) Klaus Bachler	2:03.634	+15.904	32
33	GTD	12	(United States) Vasser Sullivan Racing	(United States) Frankie Montecalvo	2:03.950	+16.220	33
34	GTD	32	(United States) Team Korthoff Motorsports	(United States) Mike Skeen	2:04.322	+16.592	34
35	GTD	27	(United States) Heart of Racing Team	(Canada) Roman De Angelis	2:04.397	+16.667	35
36	GTD	78	(United States) Forte Racing powered by US RaceTronics	(Canada) Misha Goikhberg	2:04.419	+16.689	36
37	GTD	96	(United States) Turner Motorsport	(United States) Patrick Gallagher	2:04.430	+16.700	37
38	GTD	97	(United States) Turner Motorsport	(United States) Chandler Hull	2:04.725	+16.995	38
39	GTD	57	(United States) Winward Racing	(United States) Russell Ward	2:04.880	+17.150	39
40	GTD	66	(United States) Gradient Racing	(United States) Sheena Monk	2:05.481	+17.751	40
41	GTD	93	(United States) Racers Edge Motorsports with WTR Andretti	(United States) Ashton Harrison	2:05.612	+17.882	41
42	GTD	91	(United States) Kelly-Moss with Riley	(United States) Alan Metni	2:06.496	+18.766	42
43	GTD	80	(United States) AO Racing Team	(United States) P.J. Hyett	2:06.776	+19.046	43
44	GTD	77	(United States) Wright Motorsports	(United States) Alan Brynjolfsson	2:07.372	+19.642	44
45	GTD	92	(United States) Kelly-Moss with Riley	(United States) David Brule	2:08.001	+20.271	45

== Warm up ==
A 20-minute morning warm-up session was held on the morning of August 6. Renger van der Zande lapped fastest at 1:51.748, 0.041 seconds ahead of Ricky Taylor. Mikkel Jensen led LMP2 while João Barbosa was fastest in LMP3. The fastest GTD Pro lap was a 2:04.191, set by Ross Gunn in the No. 23 Aston Martin, and Bill Auberlen's No. 97 BMW paced GTD. The No. 31 Whelen Engineering Racing Cadillac of Alexander Sims crashed at turn 13 and brought out a red flag that limited on-track running. Sim's Cadillac suffered rear suspension and gearbox damage. Action Express Racing replaced the No. 31 Cadillac's rear wing, gearbox, rear suspension, hybrid system, and undertray prior to the race start and were able to take part in the race. However, due to missing the reconnaissance laps, Alexander Sims and Pipo Derani would lose their pole position and start at the end of the GTP field. As a result, the No. 7 Porsche Penske Motorsport entry was promoted to pole position.

== Race ==
Weather conditions at the start were dry and clear. The air temperature throughout the race was between 70.8 and 73.2 °F (21.6 and 22.9 °C) and the track temperature ranged from 83.8 to 94.8 °F (28.8 to 34.9 °C). The No. 25 BMW M Hybrid V8 of Connor De Phillippi spun at the carousel on the first formation lap and got beached in the gravel trap. As a result, the opening lap of the race was completed behind the safety car while De Phillippi's BMW was getting fetched from the gravel trap. The No. 25 BMW rejoined the race and would be forced to start behind the GTD field. Green flag action commenced 4 minutes later where Matt Capmbell maintained his inherited pole position advantage heading into turn one with Sébastien Bourdais following in second. Kurtz made a slow start in LMP2 and fell behind Keating and Sales while the No. 33 Sean Creech Motorsport Ligier maintained the lead in LMP3. The No. 30 Jr III Motorsports Ligier of Ari Balogh made contact with the No. 85 JDC-Miller MotorSports Duqueine of Gerry Kraut and sent Kraut into a spin. Balogh later received a drive-through penalty for incident responsibility. After clearing the entire GTD field, De Phillippi crashed the No. 25 BMW at Turn 11. A full course caution was displayed soon after, and Phillippi's BMW was flatbedded back to the pits.

Racing resumed with 128 minutes and 2 second remaining with Campbell maintaining his lead over Bourdais. Rockenfeller dived down the inside of Eng going into turn five. The No. 5 Porsche and the No. 24 BMW made contact and sent the BMW into the grass while Albuquerque overtook both cars. Tandy received a right-rear puncture and made an unscheduled pit stop. The No. 57 Winward Racing Mercedes of Russell Ward spun at the exit of turn seven and suffered right-rear suspension failure leading to the car retiring from the race. After the first pit stop cycle, Nasr maintained the No. 7 Porsche's advantage followed by van der Zande in second. Keating retained the in LMP2 after the No. 04 CrowdStrike Oreca received a drive-through penalty for not meeting minimum refueling time during Kurtz's pit stop, and the No. 8 Tower Motorsports entry also received a drive-through penalty for not meeting minimum refueling time. Barbosa maintained the No. 33 Ligier's advantage in LMP3. The GTD field made their pit stops for fuel, tyres and driver changes which had Daniel Juncadella taking the lead of GTD Pro with Antonio Garciá in second. The No.1 Paul Miller Racing BMW retook the GTD lead and De Angeles took over second in the category.

Sims in The no. 31 Cadillac spun at turn twelve and dropped to sixth overall. The LMP2 field made their pit stops for driver changes. Delétraz in the No. 8 Oreca was given a drive-through penalty after the Tower Motorsport pit crew received outside assistance during the car's pitstop. The No. 4 Ave Motorsports car crashed at turn fourteen and it was able to rejoin the event. The No. 6 Porsche and No. 79 Mercedes, both on different pit strategies in their respective classes, pitted for fuel as well as tyres, and made a driver change. Mikkel Jensen received a left-front puncture and made an unscheduled pitstop. The No. 29 Jr III Motorsports of Colin Noble crashed at the exit of turn ten and retired due to damage sustained from the accident. Philipp Eng in his No. 24 BMW M Hybrid V8 suffered a loss of power and retired from the race with gearbox problems. After the final pit stop cycle, Nasr kept the lead and Blomqvist maintained second. Loup-Chatin kept his advantage over van der Garde in LMP2. Barbosa kept the lead in LMP3 followed by Burdon in second. The No. 3 Corvette received a drive-through penalty for not meeting minimum refueling time during Garciá's pitstop. After Garciá served his penalty, Gunn retook the lead of GTD Pro with Gounon in second, and Barnicoat in third. Snow took over from Sellers in the No. 1 car and kept the lead in GTD and Farnbacher took over second in the category.

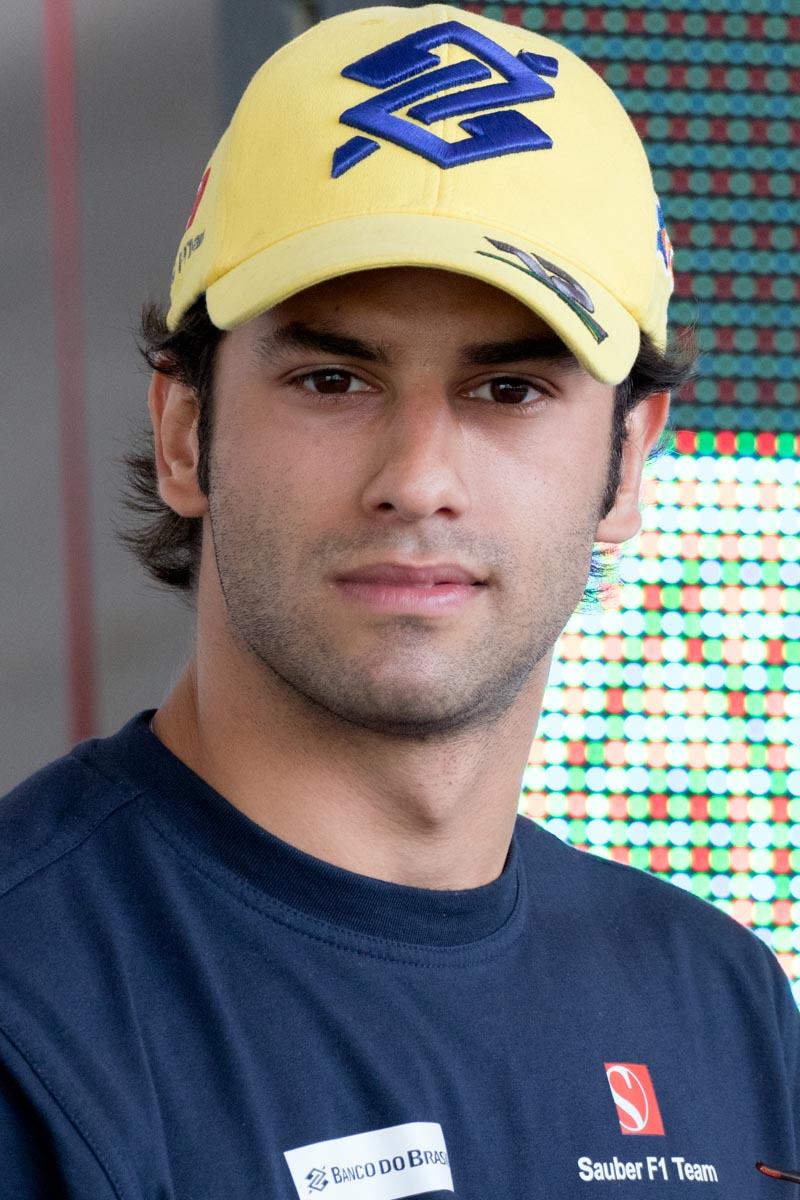
Felipe Nasr (pictured in 2015) secured the No. 7 Porsche's first victory of the season.

Jaminet had an unscheduled pit stop and his No. 6 Porsche received a rear wing change. The No. 74 Ligier of Josh Burdon went wide at turn ten and lost two seconds to João Barbosa in LMP3. The No. 25 BMW rejoined the race where Nick Yelloly completed two laps before retiring from the event. Burdon overtook Barbosa for the lead in LMP3 with 21 minutes remaining. Gounon and Farnbacher made late pit stops for fuel. The No. 77 Wright Motorsports Porsche and No. 96 Turner Motorsport BMW ran out of fuel on and did not finish the event. Nasr maintained the lead for the rest of the race winning after completing 80 laps. Blomqvist finished second, 4.635 seconds adrift of the No. 7 Porsche, and Ricky Taylor completed the podium positions by finishing third. It was Porsche's second overall series' victory of the season. Unchallenged in the closing stages, PR1/Mathiasen Motorsports were victorious in LMP2, 9.517 seconds ahead of the second-place No. 35 TDS Racing car of Giedo van der Garde and John Falb, and third-position finishers Jensen and Thomas in the sister No. 11 TDS Racing car. Burdon maintained the No. 74 Riley Motorsports Ligier's lead to win in LMP3 by 11.785 seconds over the No. 33 car followed by the No. 13 AWA of Bell and Fidani. Gunn maintained his advantage to take Heart of Racing Team's second consecutive GTD Pro win of 2023. The No. 14 Lexus of Barnicoat and Hawksworth took second; Garciá and Taylor's No. 3 car took third. In GTD, Sellers and Snow took their fourth win of the season in the No. 1 BMW and were 2.261 seconds ahead of Brendan Iribe and Frederik Schandorff in the No. 70 McLaren.

=== Post-race ===
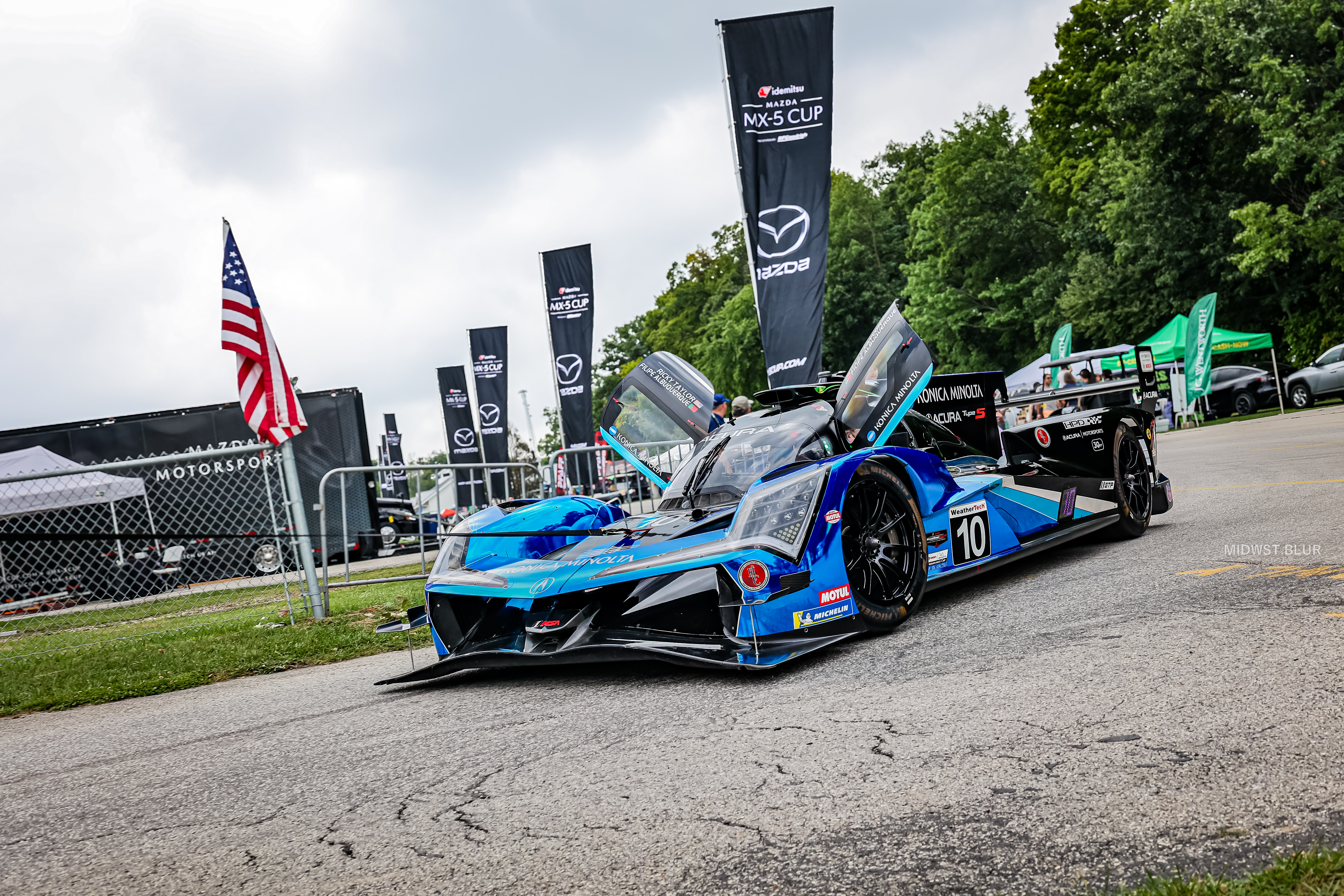
The No. 10 Wayne Taylor Racing car took the lead of the GTP Drivers' Championship

By finishing third place, Filipe Albuquerque and Ricky Taylor took the lead of the GTP Drivers' Championship. Derani and Sims dropped from first to second while Blomqvist and Braun advanced from sixth to fifth. As a result of winning the race, Paul-Loup Chatin and Ben Keating took the lead of the LMP2 Drivers' Championship with 1345 points. Ben Hanley and George Kurtz dropped from first to third while van der Garde advanced from fifth to fourth. In LMP3, Bell and Fidani advanced from fourth to second in the Drivers' Standings while Boyd and Mantella dropped from second to fourth. The result kept Barnicoat and Hawksworth atop the GTD Pro Drivers' Championship. In the GTD Drivers' Championship, Sellers and Snow extended their points lead to 169 points, ahead of seventh-place finishers De Angelis and Sørensen. Grenier and Skeen advanced from ninth to fifth while Telitz and Montecalvo dropped from third to fourth. Cadillac, Lexus, and BMW continued to top their respective Manufacturers' Championships, while Riley Motorsports, Vasser Sullivan Racing, and Paul Miller Racing kept their respective advantages in their respective of Teams' Championships. WTR with Andretti Autosport and PR1/Mathiasen Motorsports became the leaders of their respective class Teams' Championships with three rounds remaining in the season.

=== Race Result ===
Class winners are in bold and ‡.

Pos	Class	No	Team	Drivers	Chassis	Laps	Time/Retired
Pos	Class	No	Team	Drivers	Engine	Laps	Time/Retired
1	**GTP**	**7**	**(Germany) Porsche Penske Motorsport**	**(Australia) Matt Campbell (Brazil) Felipe Nasr**	**Porsche 963**	**80**	**2:41:23.753‡**
1	**GTP**	**7**	**(Germany) Porsche Penske Motorsport**	**(Australia) Matt Campbell (Brazil) Felipe Nasr**	**Porsche 9RD 4.6 L Turbo V8**	**80**	**2:41:23.753‡**
2	GTP	60	(United States) Meyer Shank Racing with Curb-Agajanian	(United Kingdom) Tom Blomqvist (United States) Colin Braun	Acura ARX-06	80	+4.635
2	GTP	60	(United States) Meyer Shank Racing with Curb-Agajanian	(United Kingdom) Tom Blomqvist (United States) Colin Braun	Acura AR24e 2.4 L Turbo V6	80	+4.635
3	GTP	10	(United States) Wayne Taylor Racing with Andretti Autosport	(Portugal) Filipe Albuquerque (United States) Ricky Taylor	Acura ARX-06	80	+35.135
3	GTP	10	(United States) Wayne Taylor Racing with Andretti Autosport	(Portugal) Filipe Albuquerque (United States) Ricky Taylor	Acura AR24e 2.4 L Turbo V6	80	+35.135
4	GTP	01	(United States) Cadillac Racing	(France) Sébastien Bourdais (Netherlands) Renger van der Zande	Cadillac V-Series.R	80	+47.321
4	GTP	01	(United States) Cadillac Racing	(France) Sébastien Bourdais (Netherlands) Renger van der Zande	Cadillac LMC55R 5.5 L V8	80	+47.321
5	GTP	5	(United States) JDC-Miller MotorSports	(Germany) Mike Rockenfeller (Netherlands) Tijmen van der Helm	Porsche 963	80	+1:18.147
5	GTP	5	(United States) JDC-Miller MotorSports	(Germany) Mike Rockenfeller (Netherlands) Tijmen van der Helm	Porsche 9RD 4.6 L Turbo V8	80	+1:18.147
6	GTP	31	(United States) Whelen Engineering Racing	(Brazil) Pipo Derani (United Kingdom) Alexander Sims	Cadillac V-Series.R	80	+1:35.777
6	GTP	31	(United States) Whelen Engineering Racing	(Brazil) Pipo Derani (United Kingdom) Alexander Sims	Cadillac LMC55R 5.5 L V8	80	+1:35.777
7	GTP	6	(Germany) Porsche Penske Motorsport	(France) Mathieu Jaminet (United Kingdom) Nick Tandy	Porsche 963	80	+1:45.321
7	GTP	6	(Germany) Porsche Penske Motorsport	(France) Mathieu Jaminet (United Kingdom) Nick Tandy	Porsche 9RD 4.6 L Turbo V8	80	+1:45.321
8	GTP	59	(Germany) Proton Competition	(Italy) Gianmaria Bruni (United Kingdom) Harry Tincknell	Porsche 963	80	+1:47.489
8	GTP	59	(Germany) Proton Competition	(Italy) Gianmaria Bruni (United Kingdom) Harry Tincknell	Porsche 9RD 4.6 L Turbo V8	80	+1:47.489
9	**LMP2**	**52**	**(United States) PR1/Mathiasen Motorsports**	**(France) Paul-Loup Chatin (United States) Ben Keating**	**Oreca 07**	**77**	**+3 Laps‡**
9	**LMP2**	**52**	**(United States) PR1/Mathiasen Motorsports**	**(France) Paul-Loup Chatin (United States) Ben Keating**	**Gibson GK428 4.2 L V8 engine**	**77**	**+3 Laps‡**
10	LMP2	35	(France) TDS Racing	(Netherlands) Giedo van der Garde (United States) John Falb	Oreca 07	77	+3 Laps
10	LMP2	35	(France) TDS Racing	(Netherlands) Giedo van der Garde (United States) John Falb	Gibson GK428 4.2 L V8 engine	77	+3 Laps
11	LMP2	11	(France) TDS Racing	(Denmark) Mikkel Jensen (United States) Steven Thomas	Oreca 07	77	+3 Laps
11	LMP2	11	(France) TDS Racing	(Denmark) Mikkel Jensen (United States) Steven Thomas	Gibson GK428 4.2 L V8 engine	77	+3 Laps
12	LMP2	8	(United States) Tower Motorsports	(Switzerland) Louis Delétraz (United States) Rodrigo Sales	Oreca 07	77	+3 Laps
12	LMP2	8	(United States) Tower Motorsports	(Switzerland) Louis Delétraz (United States) Rodrigo Sales	Gibson GK428 4.2 L V8 engine	77	+3 Laps
13	LMP2	20	(Denmark) High Class Racing	(Denmark) Dennis Andersen (United Arab Emirates) Ed Jones	Oreca 07	77	+3 Laps
13	LMP2	20	(Denmark) High Class Racing	(Denmark) Dennis Andersen (United Arab Emirates) Ed Jones	Gibson GK428 4.2 L V8 engine	77	+3 Laps
14	LMP2	18	(United States) Era Motorsport	(United Kingdom) Ryan Dalziel (United States) Dwight Merriman	Oreca 07	76	+4 Laps
14	LMP2	18	(United States) Era Motorsport	(United Kingdom) Ryan Dalziel (United States) Dwight Merriman	Gibson GK428 4.2 L V8 engine	76	+4 Laps
15	LMP2	04	(United States) CrowdStrike Racing by APR	(United Kingdom) Ben Hanley (United States) George Kurtz	Oreca 07	76	+4 Laps
15	LMP2	04	(United States) CrowdStrike Racing by APR	(United Kingdom) Ben Hanley (United States) George Kurtz	Gibson GK428 4.2 L V8 engine	76	+4 Laps
16	**LMP3**	**74**	**(United States) Riley Motorsports**	**(Australia) Josh Burdon (United States) Gar Robinson**	**Ligier JS P320**	**75**	**+5 Laps‡**
16	**LMP3**	**74**	**(United States) Riley Motorsports**	**(Australia) Josh Burdon (United States) Gar Robinson**	**Nissan VK56DE 5.6L V8 engine**	**75**	**+5 Laps‡**
17	LMP3	33	(United States) Sean Creech Motorsport	(Portugal) João Barbosa (Chile) Nico Pino	Ligier JS P320	75	+5 Laps
17	LMP3	33	(United States) Sean Creech Motorsport	(Portugal) João Barbosa (Chile) Nico Pino	Nissan VK56DE 5.6L V8 engine	75	+5 Laps
18	LMP3	13	(Canada) AWA	(United Kingdom) Matt Bell (Canada) Orey Fidani	Duqueine M30 - D08	75	+5 Laps
18	LMP3	13	(Canada) AWA	(United Kingdom) Matt Bell (Canada) Orey Fidani	Nissan VK56DE 5.6L V8 engine	75	+5 Laps
19	LMP3	30	(United States) Jr III Motorsports	(United States) Ari Balogh (Canada) Garett Grist	Ligier JS P320	75	+5 Laps
19	LMP3	30	(United States) Jr III Motorsports	(United States) Ari Balogh (Canada) Garett Grist	Nissan VK56DE 5.6L V8 engine	75	+5 Laps
20	LMP3	17	(Canada) AWA	(United Kingdom) Wayne Boyd (Canada) Anthony Mantella	Duqueine M30 - D08	74	+6 Laps
20	LMP3	17	(Canada) AWA	(United Kingdom) Wayne Boyd (Canada) Anthony Mantella	Nissan VK56DE 5.6L V8 engine	74	+6 Laps
21	**GTD Pro**	**23**	**(United States) Heart of Racing Team**	**(United Kingdom) Ross Gunn (Spain) Alex Riberas**	**Aston Martin Vantage AMR GT3**	**73**	**+7 Laps‡**
21	**GTD Pro**	**23**	**(United States) Heart of Racing Team**	**(United Kingdom) Ross Gunn (Spain) Alex Riberas**	**Aston Martin 4.0 L Turbo V8**	**73**	**+7 Laps‡**
22	LMP3	4	(United States) Ave Motorsports	(United States) Seth Lucas (Estonia) Tõnis Kasemets	Ligier JS P320	72	+8 Laps
22	LMP3	4	(United States) Ave Motorsports	(United States) Seth Lucas (Estonia) Tõnis Kasemets	Nissan VK56DE 5.6L V8 engine	72	+8 Laps
23	**GTD**	**1**	**(United States) Paul Miller Racing**	**(United States) Bryan Sellers (United States) Madison Snow**	**BMW M4 GT3**	**72**	**+8 Laps‡**
23	**GTD**	**1**	**(United States) Paul Miller Racing**	**(United States) Bryan Sellers (United States) Madison Snow**	**BMW S58B30T0 3.0 L Turbo I6**	**72**	**+8 Laps‡**
24	GTD	70	(United Kingdom) Inception Racing	(United States) Brendan Iribe (Denmark) Frederik Schandorff	McLaren 720S GT3 Evo	72	+8 Laps
24	GTD	70	(United Kingdom) Inception Racing	(United States) Brendan Iribe (Denmark) Frederik Schandorff	McLaren M840T 4.0 L Turbo V8	72	+8 Laps
25	LMP3	85	(United States) JDC-Miller MotorSports	(United States) Gerry Kraut (Australia) Scott Andrews	Duqueine M30 - D08	72	+8 Laps
25	LMP3	85	(United States) JDC-Miller MotorSports	(United States) Gerry Kraut (Australia) Scott Andrews	Nissan VK56DE 5.6L V8 engine	72	+8 Laps
26	GTD Pro	14	(United States) Vasser Sullivan Racing	(United Kingdom) Ben Barnicoat (United Kingdom) Jack Hawksworth	Lexus RC F GT3	72	+8 Laps
26	GTD Pro	14	(United States) Vasser Sullivan Racing	(United Kingdom) Ben Barnicoat (United Kingdom) Jack Hawksworth	Toyota 2UR 5.0 L V8	72	+8 Laps
27	GTD Pro	3	(United States) Corvette Racing	(Spain) Antonio García (United States) Jordan Taylor	Chevrolet Corvette C8.R GTD	72	+8 Laps
27	GTD Pro	3	(United States) Corvette Racing	(Spain) Antonio García (United States) Jordan Taylor	Chevrolet 5.5 L V8	72	+8 Laps
28	GTD Pro	9	(Canada) Pfaff Motorsports	(Austria) Klaus Bachler (France) Patrick Pilet	Porsche 911 GT3 R (992)	72	+8 Laps
28	GTD Pro	9	(Canada) Pfaff Motorsports	(Austria) Klaus Bachler (France) Patrick Pilet	Porsche 4.2 L Flat-6	72	+8 Laps
29	GTD	32	(United States) Team Korthoff Motorsports	(Canada) Mikaël Grenier (United States) Mike Skeen	Mercedes-AMG GT3 Evo	72	+8 Laps
29	GTD	32	(United States) Team Korthoff Motorsports	(Canada) Mikaël Grenier (United States) Mike Skeen	Mercedes-AMG M159 6.2 L V8	72	+8 Laps
30	GTD	78	(United States) Forte Racing powered by US RaceTronics	(Canada) Misha Goikhberg (Italy) Loris Spinelli	Lamborghini Huracán GT3 Evo 2	72	+8 Laps
30	GTD	78	(United States) Forte Racing powered by US RaceTronics	(Canada) Misha Goikhberg (Italy) Loris Spinelli	Lamborghini 5.2 L V10	72	+8 Laps
31	GTD	12	(United States) Vasser Sullivan Racing	(United States) Frankie Montecalvo (United States) Aaron Telitz	Lexus RC F GT3	72	+8 Laps
31	GTD	12	(United States) Vasser Sullivan Racing	(United States) Frankie Montecalvo (United States) Aaron Telitz	Toyota 2UR 5.0 L V8	72	+8 Laps
32	GTD	97	(United States) Turner Motorsport	(United States) Bill Auberlen (United States) Chandler Hull	BMW M4 GT3	72	+8 Laps
32	GTD	97	(United States) Turner Motorsport	(United States) Bill Auberlen (United States) Chandler Hull	BMW S58B30T0 3.0 L Turbo I6	72	+8 Laps
33	GTD	27	(United States) Heart of Racing Team	(Canada) Roman De Angelis (Denmark) Marco Sørensen	Aston Martin Vantage AMR GT3	72	+8 Laps
33	GTD	27	(United States) Heart of Racing Team	(Canada) Roman De Angelis (Denmark) Marco Sørensen	Aston Martin 4.0 L Turbo V8	72	+8 Laps
34	GTD	93	(United States) Racers Edge Motorsports with WTR Andretti	(United States) Ashton Harrison (Germany) Mario Farnbacher	Acura NSX GT3 Evo22	72	+8 Laps
34	GTD	93	(United States) Racers Edge Motorsports with WTR Andretti	(United States) Ashton Harrison (Germany) Mario Farnbacher	Acura 3.5 L Turbo V6	72	+8 Laps
35	GTD	91	(United States) Kelly-Moss with Riley	(Netherlands) Kay van Berlo (United States) Alan Metni	Porsche 911 GT3 R (992)	72	+8 Laps
35	GTD	91	(United States) Kelly-Moss with Riley	(Netherlands) Kay van Berlo (United States) Alan Metni	Porsche 4.2 L Flat-6	72	+8 Laps
36	GTD Pro	79	(United States) WeatherTech Racing	(Andorra) Jules Gounon (Spain) Daniel Juncadella	Mercedes-AMG GT3 Evo	72	+8 Laps
36	GTD Pro	79	(United States) WeatherTech Racing	(Andorra) Jules Gounon (Spain) Daniel Juncadella	Mercedes-AMG M159 6.2 L V8	72	+8 Laps
37	GTD	66	(United States) Gradient Racing	(United Kingdom) Katherine Legge (United States) Sheena Monk	Acura NSX GT3 Evo22	72	+8 Laps
37	GTD	66	(United States) Gradient Racing	(United Kingdom) Katherine Legge (United States) Sheena Monk	Acura 3.5 L Turbo V6	72	+8 Laps
38	GTD	80	(United States) AO Racing Team	(United States) P.J. Hyett (United Kingdom) Sebastian Priaulx	Porsche 911 GT3 R (992)	72	+8 Laps
38	GTD	80	(United States) AO Racing Team	(United States) P.J. Hyett (United Kingdom) Sebastian Priaulx	Porsche 4.2 L Flat-6	72	+8 Laps
39 DNF	GTD	96	(United States) Turner Motorsport	(United States) Robby Foley (United States) Patrick Gallagher	BMW M4 GT3	71	Did Not Finish
39 DNF	GTD	96	(United States) Turner Motorsport	(United States) Robby Foley (United States) Patrick Gallagher	BMW S58B30T0 3.0 L Turbo I6	71	Did Not Finish
40	GTD	92	(United States) Kelly-Moss with Riley	(United States) David Brule (United States) Alec Udell	Porsche 911 GT3 R (992)	71	+9 Laps
40	GTD	92	(United States) Kelly-Moss with Riley	(United States) David Brule (United States) Alec Udell	Porsche 4.2 L Flat-6	71	+9 Laps
41 DNF	GTD	77	(United States) Wright Motorsports	(United States) Alan Brynjolfsson (United States) Trent Hindman	Porsche 911 GT3 R (992)	70	Did Not Finish
41 DNF	GTD	77	(United States) Wright Motorsports	(United States) Alan Brynjolfsson (United States) Trent Hindman	Porsche 4.2 L Flat-6	70	Did Not Finish
42 DNF	GTP	24	(United States) BMW M Team RLL	(Austria) Philipp Eng (Brazil) Augusto Farfus	BMW M Hybrid V8	55	Did Not Finish
42 DNF	GTP	24	(United States) BMW M Team RLL	(Austria) Philipp Eng (Brazil) Augusto Farfus	BMW P66/3 4.0 L Turbo V8	55	Did Not Finish
43 DNF	LMP3	29	(United States) Jr III Motorsports	(United States) Bijoy Garg (United Kingdom) Colin Noble	Ligier JS P320	54	Did Not Finish
43 DNF	LMP3	29	(United States) Jr III Motorsports	(United States) Bijoy Garg (United Kingdom) Colin Noble	Nissan VK56DE 5.6L V8 engine	54	Did Not Finish
44 DNF	GTD	57	(United States) Winward Racing	(United Kingdom) Philip Ellis (United States) Russell Ward	Mercedes-AMG GT3 Evo	15	Did Not Finish
44 DNF	GTD	57	(United States) Winward Racing	(United Kingdom) Philip Ellis (United States) Russell Ward	Mercedes-AMG M159 6.2 L V8	15	Did Not Finish
45 DNF	GTP	25	(United States) BMW M Team RLL	(United States) Connor De Phillippi (United Kingdom) Nick Yelloly	BMW M Hybrid V8	4	Did Not Finish
45 DNF	GTP	25	(United States) BMW M Team RLL	(United States) Connor De Phillippi (United Kingdom) Nick Yelloly	BMW P66/3 4.0 L Turbo V8	4	Did Not Finish

== Standings after the race ==
GTP Drivers' Championship standings
Pos.	+/–	Driver	Points
1	2	(Portugal) Filipe Albuquerque (United States) Ricky Taylor	2171
2	1	(Brazil) Pipo Derani (United Kingdom) Alexander Sims	2157
3	1	(United States) Connor De Phillippi (United Kingdom) Nick Yelloly	2098
4		(United Kingdom) Nick Tandy (France) Mathieu Jaminet	2073
5	1	(United Kingdom) Tom Blomqvist (United States) Colin Braun	2053

LMP2 Drivers' Championship standings
Pos.	+/–	Driver	Points
1	2	(France) Paul-Loup Chatin (United States) Ben Keating	1345
2		(Denmark) Mikkel Jensen (United States) Steven Thomas	1300
3	2	(United Kingdom) Ben Hanley (United States) George Kurtz	1248
4	1	(Netherlands) Giedo van der Garde	1194
5	1	(United Kingdom) Ryan Dalziel (United States) Dwight Merriman	1182

LMP3 Drivers' Championship standings
Pos.	+/–	Driver	Points
1		(United States) Gar Robinson	1495
2	2	(United Kingdom) Matt Bell (Canada) Orey Fidani	1244
3		(Canada) Garett Grist	1233
4	2	(United Kingdom) Wayne Boyd (Canada) Anthony Mantella	1218
5		(Portugal) João Barbosa	1143

GTD Pro Drivers' Championship standings
Pos.	+/–	Driver	Points
1		(United Kingdom) Ben Barnicoat (United Kingdom) Jack Hawksworth	2810
2		(Spain) Antonio García (United States) Jordan Taylor	2641
3		(Andorra) Jules Gounon (Spain) Daniel Juncadella	2594
4		(Austria) Klaus Bachler (France) Patrick Pilet	2587
5		(United Kingdom) Ross Gunn (Spain) Alex Riberas	2468

GTD Drivers' Championship standings
Pos.	+/–	Driver	Points
1		(United States) Bryan Sellers (United States) Madison Snow	2611
2		(Canada) Roman De Angelis (Denmark) Marco Sørensen	2406
3	1	(United States) Brendan Iribe (Denmark) Frederik Schandorff	2272
4	1	(United States) Aaron Telitz (United States) Frankie Montecalvo	2261
5	4	(Canada) Mikaël Grenier (United States) Mike Skeen	2024

- Note: Only the top five positions are included for all sets of standings.

GTP Teams' Championship standings
Pos.	+/–	Team	Points
1	2	(United States) #10 WTR with Andretti Autosport	2171
2	1	(United States) #31 Whelen Engineering Racing	2157
3	1	(United States) #25 BMW M Team RLL	2098
4		(Germany) #6 Porsche Penske Motorsport	2073
5	1	(United States) #60 Meyer Shank Racing with Curb-Agajanian	2053

LMP2 Teams' Championship standings
Pos.	+/–	Team	Points
1	2	(United States) #52 PR1/Mathiasen Motorsports	1345
2		(France) #11 TDS Racing	1300
3	2	(United States) #04 CrowdStrike Racing by APR	1248
4	1	(United States) #8 Tower Motorsports	1201
5	1	(France) #35 TDS Racing	1194

LMP3 Teams' Championship standings
Pos.	+/–	Team	Points
1		(United States) #74 Riley Motorsports	1495
2	2	(Canada) #13 AWA	1244
3		(United States) #30 Jr III Motorsports	1233
4	2	(Canada) #17 AWA	1218
5	1	(United States) #33 Sean Creech Motorsport	1143

GTD Pro Teams' Championship standings
Pos.	+/–	Team	Points
1		(United States) #14 Vasser Sullivan Racing	2810
2		(United States) #3 Corvette Racing	2641
3		(United States) #79 WeatherTech Racing	2594
4		(Canada) #9 Pfaff Motorsports	2587
5		(United States) #23 Heart of Racing Team	2468

GTD Teams' Championship standings
Pos.	+/–	Team	Points
1		(United States) #1 Paul Miller Racing	2611
2		(United States) #27 Heart of Racing Team	2406
3	1	(United Kingdom) #70 Inception Racing	2272
4	1	(United States) #12 Vasser Sullivan Racing	2261
5	4	(United States) #32 Team Korthoff Motorsports	2024

- Note: Only the top five positions are included for all sets of standings.

GTP Manufacturers' Championship standings
Pos.	+/–	Manufacturer	Points
1		(United States) Cadillac	2414
2	2	(Japan) Acura	2379
3	1	(Germany) Porsche	2367
4	2	(Germany) BMW	2340

GTD Pro Manufacturers' Championship standings
Pos.	+/–	Manufacturer	Points
1		(Japan) Lexus	2810
2		(United States) Chevrolet	2641
3		(Germany) Mercedes-AMG	2594
4		(Germany) Porsche	2587
5		(United Kingdom) Aston Martin	2479

GTD Manufacturers' Championship standings
Pos.	+/–	Manufacturer	Points
1		(Germany) BMW	2820
2		(United Kingdom) Aston Martin	2595
3	2	(United Kingdom) McLaren	2469
4	1	(Germany) Porsche	2447
5	1	(Japan) Lexus	2431

- Note: Only the top five positions are included for all sets of standings.

IMSA SportsCar Championship
Previous race: 2023 Northeast Grand Prix	2023 season	Next race: 2023 Michelin GT Challenge at VIR
