= 2019 Formula 4 South East Asia Championship =

Motor racing competition

The 2019 Formula 4 South East Asia Championship – Fueled by Petron was the fourth season of the Formula 4 South East Asia Championship. It began at the Sepang International Circuit on 5 April and ended at the same venue on 15 December.

== Calendar ==
The ten-event, forty-race calendar was released on 2 April 2019. On 9 October 2019 the series announced it was replacing the final 2 rounds at Clark International Speedway with 2 rounds at Sepang International Circuit.

Round	Circuit	Dates	Supporting	Map
1	(Malaysia) Sepang International Circuit	6–7 April	Malaysia Championship Series; Blancpain GT World Challenge Asia; F3 Asian Championship; TCR Asia Series	2019 Formula 4 South East Asia Championship is located in Asia-Pacific
2	(Malaysia) Sepang International Circuit	20–21 April	Malaysia Championship Series	2019 Formula 4 South East Asia Championship is located in Asia-Pacific
3	(Thailand) Buriram International Circuit	10–11 May	Blancpain GT World Challenge Asia; F3 Asian Championship	2019 Formula 4 South East Asia Championship is located in Asia-Pacific
4	(Thailand) Buriram International Circuit	14–15 June	RAAT Thailand Endurance Championship Int'l	2019 Formula 4 South East Asia Championship is located in Asia-Pacific
5	(India) Madras Motor Race Track	14 July	Main event	2019 Formula 4 South East Asia Championship is located in Asia-Pacific
6	(India) Madras Motor Race Track	20–21 July	Main event	2019 Formula 4 South East Asia Championship is located in Asia-Pacific
7	(Malaysia) Sepang International Circuit	24–25 August	Malaysia Championship Series	2019 Formula 4 South East Asia Championship is located in Asia-Pacific
8	(Malaysia) Sepang International Circuit	28–29 September	Malaysia Championship Series	2019 Formula 4 South East Asia Championship is located in Asia-Pacific
9	(Malaysia) Sepang International Circuit	23–24 November	Sepang 1000 km Audi R8 LMS Cup	2019 Formula 4 South East Asia Championship is located in Asia-Pacific
10	(Malaysia) Sepang International Circuit	13–15 December	World Touring Car Cup; FIM Endurance World Championship; F3 Asian Championship	2019 Formula 4 South East Asia Championship is located in Asia-Pacific
Cancelled events				2019 Formula 4 South East Asia Championship is located in Asia-Pacific
–	(Philippines) Clark International Speedway	15–17 November	Main event	2019 Formula 4 South East Asia Championship is located in Asia-Pacific
–	(Philippines) Clark International Speedway	22–24 November	Main event	2019 Formula 4 South East Asia Championship is located in Asia-Pacific

== Drivers ==
The following drivers competed in the series. All cars were run by Malaysian team Meritus GP. All drivers used the Mygale M14-F4 chassis.

No.	Driver	Rounds	Status	Category
1	(Thailand) Folky Wongsechareon	3	G	R
1	(Malaysia) Nik Iruwan	7	G	
3	(Republic of Ireland) Lucca Allen	All		
4	(Sweden) Emil Skärås	1	G	R
5	(Australia) Josh Smith	1–4, 7		
6	(Japan) Ryo Komikado	2	G	
7	(Japan) Yuma Shoji	7	G	
7	(France) Sami Meguetounif	10	G	R
8	(Denmark) Malthe Jakobsen	1–3		
9	(India) Sneha Sharma	2–10		L
10	(India) Arya Singh	2	G	
12	(South Africa) Shrien Naidoo	1	G	R
13	(Malaysia) Muizz Musyaffa	All		
14	(Singapore) Wahyu Hashim	10	G	R
16	(South Africa) Ivana Cetinich	10	G	L
17	(Bahrain) Abdullah Beshara	1	G	
17	(India) Yash Aradhya	3–6		
19	(Malaysia) Amer Harris	2, 7, 9-10		R
20	(Bahrain) Talal Beshara	1	G	
22	(Malaysia) Alister Yoong	1–7		
23	(Australia) Luis Leeds	1		
23	(Ukraine) Ivan Peklin	10	G	R
24	(India) Sohil Shah	8	G	
26	(France) Hadrien David	1, 7		R
27	(Qatar) Omar Aswat	9	G	
33	(India) Muhammad Ibrahim	5, 7		R
34	(Oman) Shihab Al Habsi	2–7, 10		
36	(India) Mira Erda	2, 5–6		L
42	(Republic of Ireland) Luke Thompson	1, 7, 9		
46	(Kazakhstan) Lyubov Ozeretskovskaya	1–2		L
57	(Portugal) Frederico Peters	7–10		R
58	(Finland) Elias Seppänen	All		R
62	(Republic of Ireland) Max Hart	10	G	
64	(Jordan) Ali Akabi (Note: Ali Akabi is an Iraqi driver competing under a Jordanian license. The FIA did not recognise the Iraqi ASN (Iraq Club for Cars and Motorcycles) at the time (having only done so since 2021), despite Akabi appearing as Iraqi on the series entry list.)	1–2, 4		R
77	(Thailand) Ananthorn Tangniannatchai	4	G	R
78	(Chile) Nico Pino	8	G	R
92	(Australia) Ricky Capo	10	G	
96	(Philippines) John Dizon	8	G	
99	(Malaysia) Isyraf Danish	9	G	

Icon	Status / Category
G	Guest drivers ineligible for Drivers' Championship
L	Lady
R	Rookie

== Results and standings ==
=== Results overview ===
Round		Event	Pole position	Fastest lap	Winning driver
1	R1	(Malaysia) Sepang 1	(Sweden) Emil Skärås (Note: Emil Skärås claimed the pole position as a guest driver. The 3 bonus points has been given to the highest qualified eligible driver – Hadrien David.)	(France) Hadrien David	(France) Hadrien David
1	R2	(Malaysia) Sepang 1		(Malaysia) Alister Yoong	(Sweden) Emil Skärås
1	R3	(Malaysia) Sepang 1		(France) Hadrien David	(France) Hadrien David
1	R4	(Malaysia) Sepang 1	(France) Hadrien David	(France) Hadrien David	(France) Hadrien David
2	R1	(Malaysia) Sepang 2	(Australia) Josh Smith	(Australia) Josh Smith	(Republic of Ireland) Lucca Allen
2	R2	(Malaysia) Sepang 2		(Republic of Ireland) Lucca Allen	(Finland) Elias Seppänen
2	R3	(Malaysia) Sepang 2		(Republic of Ireland) Lucca Allen	(Republic of Ireland) Lucca Allen
2	R4	(Malaysia) Sepang 2	(Australia) Josh Smith	(Australia) Josh Smith	(Australia) Josh Smith
3	R1	(Thailand) Buriram 1	(Republic of Ireland) Lucca Allen	(Malaysia) Muizz Musyaffa	(Oman) Shihab Al Habsi
3	R2	(Thailand) Buriram 1		(Republic of Ireland) Lucca Allen	(Republic of Ireland) Lucca Allen
3	R3	(Thailand) Buriram 1		(Finland) Elias Seppänen	(Oman) Shihab Al Habsi
3	R4	(Thailand) Buriram 1	(Republic of Ireland) Lucca Allen	(Malaysia) Muizz Musyaffa	(Republic of Ireland) Lucca Allen
4	R1	(Thailand) Buriram 2	(Oman) Shihab Al Habsi	(Oman) Shihab Al Habsi	(Republic of Ireland) Lucca Allen
4	R2	(Thailand) Buriram 2		(Australia) Josh Smith	(Australia) Josh Smith
4	R3	(Thailand) Buriram 2		(Australia) Josh Smith	(Oman) Shihab Al Habsi
4	R4	(Thailand) Buriram 2	(Republic of Ireland) Lucca Allen	(Oman) Shihab Al Habsi	(Republic of Ireland) Lucca Allen
5	R1	(India) Chennai 1	(Finland) Elias Seppänen	(Malaysia) Alister Yoong	(Finland) Elias Seppänen
5	R2	(India) Chennai 1		(Malaysia) Alister Yoong	(Malaysia) Alister Yoong
5	R3	(India) Chennai 1		(Finland) Elias Seppänen	(Finland) Elias Seppänen
5	R4	(India) Chennai 1	(Finland) Elias Seppänen	(Republic of Ireland) Lucca Allen	(Finland) Elias Seppänen
6	R1	(India) Chennai 2	(Republic of Ireland) Lucca Allen	(Republic of Ireland) Lucca Allen	(Oman) Shihab Al Habsi
6	R2	(India) Chennai 2		(Republic of Ireland) Lucca Allen	(Finland) Elias Seppänen
6	R3	(India) Chennai 2		(Finland) Elias Seppänen	(Republic of Ireland) Lucca Allen
6	R4	(India) Chennai 2	(Republic of Ireland) Lucca Allen	(Oman) Shihab Al Habsi	(Republic of Ireland) Lucca Allen
7	R1	(Malaysia) Sepang 3	(France) Hadrien David	(France) Hadrien David	(France) Hadrien David
7	R2	(Malaysia) Sepang 3		(Malaysia) Muizz Musyaffa	(France) Hadrien David
7	R3	(Malaysia) Sepang 3		(France) Hadrien David	(France) Hadrien David
7	R4	(Malaysia) Sepang 3	(France) Hadrien David	(Australia) Josh Smith	(Australia) Josh Smith
8	R1	(Malaysia) Sepang 4	(Finland) Elias Seppänen	(Finland) Elias Seppänen	(Finland) Elias Seppänen
8	R2	(Malaysia) Sepang 4		(Finland) Elias Seppänen	(Finland) Elias Seppänen
8	R3	(Malaysia) Sepang 4		(Finland) Elias Seppänen	(Malaysia) Muizz Musyaffa (Note: Elias Seppänen crossed the finish line first but was disqualified for exceeding track limits and causing a collision with Lucca Allen. He also set the fastest lap, however, the bonus points has not been reallocated.)
8	R4	(Malaysia) Sepang 4	(Finland) Elias Seppänen	(Finland) Elias Seppänen	(Finland) Elias Seppänen
9	R1	(Malaysia) Sepang 5	(Finland) Elias Seppänen	(Finland) Elias Seppänen	(Republic of Ireland) Lucca Allen
9	R2	(Malaysia) Sepang 5		(Republic of Ireland) Lucca Allen	(Republic of Ireland) Lucca Allen
9	R3	(Malaysia) Sepang 5		(Republic of Ireland) Lucca Allen	(Republic of Ireland) Lucca Allen
9	R4	(Malaysia) Sepang 5	(Finland) Elias Seppänen	(Republic of Ireland) Lucca Allen	(Finland) Elias Seppänen
10	R1	(Malaysia) Sepang 6	(Finland) Elias Seppänen	(Finland) Elias Seppänen	(Finland) Elias Seppänen
10	R2	(Malaysia) Sepang 6		(Finland) Elias Seppänen	(Republic of Ireland) Lucca Allen
10	R3	(Malaysia) Sepang 6		(Malaysia) Muizz Musyaffa	(Malaysia) Muizz Musyaffa
10	R4	(Malaysia) Sepang 6	(Finland) Elias Seppänen	(France) Sami Meguetounif	(Finland) Elias Seppänen

=== Championship standings ===
The best 32 results out of 40 races counted towards the championship. Points were awarded as follows.

Position	1st	2nd	3rd	4th	5th	6th	7th	8th	9th	10th	PP	FL
Points	25	18	15	12	10	8	6	4	2	1	3	1

(key)

==== Drivers' standings ====
Pos	Driver	SEP1 (Malaysia)				SEP2 (Malaysia)				BUR1 (Thailand)				BUR2 (Thailand)				MAD1 (India)				MAD2 (India)				SEP3 (Malaysia)				SEP4 (Malaysia)				SEP5 (Malaysia)				SEP6 (Malaysia)				Pts
Pos	Driver	R1	R2	R3	R4	R1	R2	R3	R4	R1	R2	R3	R4	R1	R2	R3	R4	R1	R2	R3	R4	R1	R2	R3	R4	R1	R2	R3	R4	R1	R2	R3	R4	R1	R2	R3	R4	R1	R2	R3	R4	Pts
1	(Republic of Ireland) Lucca Allen	2	2	3	2	1	5	1	3	5	1	3	1	1	Ret	9	1	3	6	4	2	7	5	1	1	4	3	Ret	3	3	2	Ret	2	1	1	1	2	2	1	4	5	640
2	(Finland) Elias Seppänen	4	3	5	3	3	1	4	2	4	3	2	2	4	3	3	3	1	5	1	1	2	1	4	3	3	5	4	4	1	1	DSQ	1	2	2	3	1	1	3	Ret	1	639
3	(Malaysia) Muizz Musyaffa	Ret	4	6	9	4	8	6	7	2	7	4	5	8	2	4	7	6	4	5	5	4	4	3	5	5	2	2	6	2	3	1	3	3	3	6	3	5	12	1	4	446
4	(Oman) Shihab Al Habsi					Ret	3	5	Ret	1	5	1	3	3	5	1	6	4	2	2	3	1	3	2	2	6	6	3	5									3	5	12†	6	396
5	(Australia) Josh Smith	6	6	4	4	2	4	2	1	6	2	6	4	2	1	2	2									2	4	6	1													316
6	(Malaysia) Alister Yoong	5	8	Ret	8	Ret	2	13	5	7	6	5	9	6	7	6	4	5	1	3	4	3	2	5	6																	234
7	(France) Hadrien David	1	7	1	1	DNS																				1	1	1	2													195
8	(India) Sneha Sharma					10	14	11	12	10	8	10	8	10	8	Ret	9†	8	8	Ret	Ret	Ret	7	Ret	7	11	10	Ret	11	7	8	5	7	8	7	7	6	10	11	11†	10	191
9	(Portugal) Frederico Peters																									9	7	5	7	4	4	3	4	5	4	4	DNS	7	4	5	3	172
10	(India) Yash Aradhya					DNS				9	4	9	6	7	9	5	5	2	3	7	7	5	6	6	4																	144
11	(Malaysia) Amer Harris					6	9	7	8																									6	5	5	5	8	8	6	8	98
12	(Denmark) Malthe Jakobsen	3	10	2	Ret	5	7	Ret	4	3	Ret	7	Ret																													89
13	(Jordan) Ali Akabi	9	9	12	7	9	6	8	6					5	6	8	Ret																									78
14	(Republic of Ireland) Luke Thompson	DNS																								8	9	Ret	10					4	6	2	4					62
15	(India) Muhammad Ibrahim																	7	7	6	6					10	Ret	8	9													40
16	(India) Mira Erda					12	13	12	10									9	Ret	8	8	6	Ret	7	8																	35
17	(Kazakhstan) Lyubov Ozeretskovskaya	10	11	9	10	7	11	9	11																																	31
	(Australia) Luis Leeds	DNS																																								
Guest drivers ineligible to score points
	(Sweden) Emil Skärås	8	1	7	6	DNS																																				
	(France) Sami Meguetounif																																					9	2	2	2	
	(India) Sohil Shah																													5	5	2	Ret									
	(Republic of Ireland) Max Hart																																					12	8	3	7	
	(India) Arya Singh					11	10	3	9																																	
	(Philippines) John Dizon																													8	7	4	6									
	(Australia) Ricky Capo																																					4	6	8	9	
	(Thailand) Ananthorn Tangniannatchai													9	4	7	8																									
	(South Africa) Shrien Naidoo	7	5	8	5	DNS																																				
	(Chile) Nico Pino																													6	6	Ret	5									
	(Ukraine) Ivan Peklin																																					6	7	7	Ret	
	(Japan) Yuma Shoji																									7	8	7	8													
	(Qatar) Omar Aswat																																	7	8	8	7					
	(Thailand) Folky Wongsechareon									8	9	8	7																													
	(Japan) Ryo Komikado					8	12	10	Ret																																	
	(South Africa) Ivana Cetinich																																					13	9	9	11	
	(Bahrain) Abdullah Beshara	11	12	10	Ret	DNS																																				
	(Singapore) Wahyu Hashim																																					11	Ret	10	Ret	
	(Bahrain) Talal Beshara	12	13	11	11	DNS																																				
	(Malaysia) Nik Iruwan																									DNS																
	(Malaysia) Isyraf Danish																																	DNS								
Pos	Driver	R1	R2	R3	R4	R1	R2	R3	R4	R1	R2	R3	R4	R1	R2	R3	R4	R1	R2	R3	R4	R1	R2	R3	R4	R1	R2	R3	R4	R1	R2	R3	R4	R1	R2	R3	R4	R1	R2	R3	R4	Pts
Pos	Driver	SEP1 (Malaysia)				SEP2 (Malaysia)				BUR1 (Thailand)				BUR2 (Thailand)				MAD1 (India)				MAD2 (India)				SEP3 (Malaysia)				SEP4 (Malaysia)				SEP5 (Malaysia)				SEP6 (Malaysia)				Pts
