= Formula 4 South East Asia Championship =

Formula racing series

- Category: FIA Formula 4
- Region: South East Asia
- Inaugural season: 2016–17
- Teams: 4
- Constructors: Tatuus
- Engine suppliers: Abarth
- Tyre suppliers: Giti Tire
- Drivers' champion: (Vietnam) Alex Sawer
- Teams' champion: (Australia) Evans GP
- Official website: Official website

The Formula 4 South East Asia Championship is a formula racing series run to FIA Formula 4 regulations. The inaugural season was held over 2016 and 2017. The COVID-19 pandemic put a momentary stop to the championship in 2020, but in 2023, the championship was revived under a new promoter.

== History ==
Gerhard Berger and the FIA Singleseater Commission launched Formula 4 in March 2013. The goal of the Formula 4 was to make the ladder to Formula 1 more transparent. Besides sporting and technical regulations, costs are also regulated. A car to compete in this category may not exceed €30,000 and a single season in Formula 4 may not exceed €100,000. South East Asian Formula 4 was the third series to start in 2016 and the eleventh Formula 4 category overall.

The championship was cancelled for the 2024 season. It is set to return in 2025. The season scheduled for 2026 was completely cancelled. The reason for this was the outbreak of the Iran War, which left the series' race cars stranded in Dubai.

== Car ==
The South East Asian Formula 4 car used the Mygale M14-F4 car found in the Australian and the British championships and running Renault 1.6L engines similar to those used in the Danish and French series. All cars were prepared by Malaysian team Meritus GP.

In 2023, the series switched to the Tatuus F4-T421 car, the Abarth engine and the Giti tires.

== Champions ==
=== Drivers Champions ===
| Season | Champion | Races | Poles | Wins | Podiums | Fastest laps | Points | Margins |
|---|---|---|---|---|---|---|---|---|
| 2016–17 | (Indonesia) Presley Martono | 36 | 4 | 9 | 24 | 4 | 565 | 2 |
| 2017–18 | (China) Daniel Cao | 29 | 2 | 10 | 21 | 8 | 438 | 119 |
| 2018 | (France) Alessandro Ghiretti | 24 | 4 | 14 | 21 | 12 | 446 | 81 |
| 2019 | (Republic of Ireland) Lucca Allen | 40 | 5 | 12 | 27 | 9 | 619 | 2 |
| 2020 | Season cancelled due to COVID-19 pandemic | | | | | | | |
| 2021 | Season cancelled due to COVID-19 pandemic | | | | | | | |
| 2022 | Season cancelled due to COVID-19 pandemic | | | | | | | |
| 2023 | (Australia) Jack Beeton | 9 | 2 | 2 | 5 | 2 | 130 | 48 |
| 2024 | Season not held | | | | | | | |
| 2025 | (Vietnam) Alex Sawer | 15 | 6 | 9 | 12 | 9 | 359 | 98 |
| 2026 | Season cancelled due to shipping delays caused by the Iran War | | | | | | | |

=== Teams ===
| Season | Team | Poles | Wins | Podiums | Fastest laps | Points | Margin |
|---|---|---|---|---|---|---|---|
| 2023 | (Australia) AGI Sport | 2 | 3 | 7 | 3 | 148 | 0 |
| 2025 | (Australia) Evans GP | 6 | 11 | 25 | 10 | 609 | 263 |

=== Rookie Cup ===
| Season | Champion | Points |
|---|---|---|
| 2016–17 | (Indonesia) Presley Martono | 714 |
| 2017–18 | (Thailand) Kane Shepherd | 377 |
| 2018 | (France) Alessandro Ghiretti | 420 |
| 2023 | (France) Doriane Pin | 111 |
| 2025 | (Philippines) Iñigo Anton | 296 |

== Circuits ==
| Number | Circuits | Rounds | Years |
|---|---|---|---|
| 1 | (Malaysia) Sepang International Circuit | 20 (Note: Sepang International Circuit hosted 6 rounds in 2019, 4 rounds in 2018, and 3 rounds in 2016–17, 2017–18 and 2025 seasons, and 2 rounds in 2023.) | 2016–2019, 2023, 2025 |
| 2 | (Thailand) Chang International Circuit | 7 (Note: Chang International Circuit hosted 2 rounds in 2018 and 2019.) | 2017–2019, 2025 |
| 3 | (India) Madras Motor Race Track | 4 (Note: Madras Motor Race Track hosted 2 rounds in 2018 and 2019 seasons.) | 2018–2019 |
| 4 | (Philippines) Clark International Speedway | 2 | 2016–2017 |
| 5 | (Indonesia) Sentul International Circuit | 1 | 2016 |
| 5 | (China) Zhuzhou International Circuit | 1 | 2023 |
| 5 | (Thailand) Bangsaen Street Circuit | 1 | 2025 |
