= Vivien Keszthelyi =

Hungarian racing driver

Vivien Schumacher
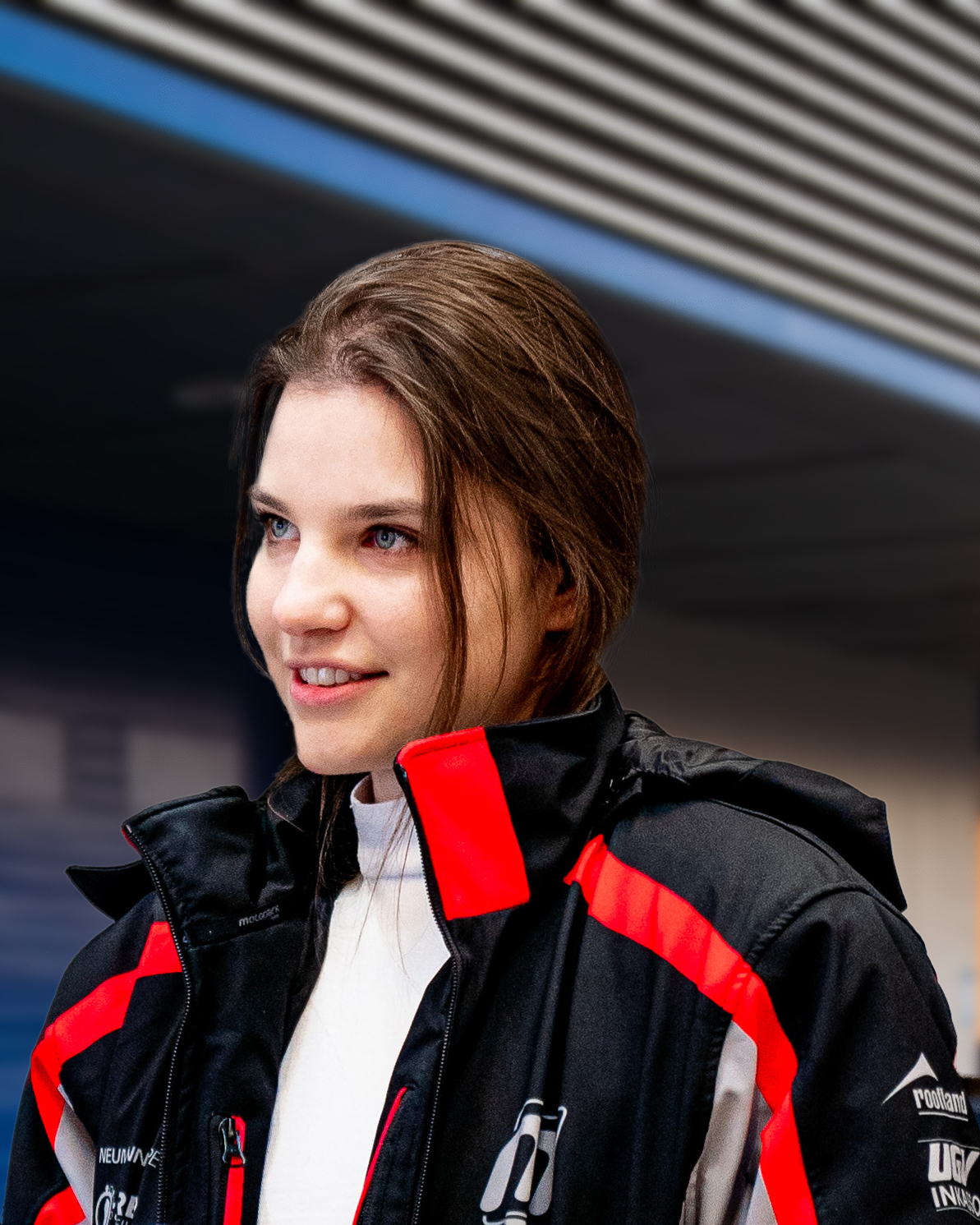
- Keszthelyi in 2020
- Nationality: Hungarian
- Born: Keszthelyi Vivien; 7 December 2000 (age 25) Debrecen, Hajdú-Bihar, Hungary
- Spouse: David Schumacher (m. 2026)

Previous series
- 2014 2014-15 2016 2017 2018 2019: Suzuki Swift Cup Austria; Suzuki Swift Cup Europe; Central European Zone Trophy; Audi Sport TT Cup; Audi Sport Seyffarth R8 LMS Cup; F3 Asian Championship Winter Series

Vivien Schumacher (née Keszthelyi, born 7 December 2000) is a Hungarian former racing driver.

== Career ==
Keszthelyi began her career in 2014 at the age of thirteen, entering the Swift Cup Europe series with a special license. At the end of the season, she finished third in the junior and sixth in the overall standings. The promoter of Swift Cup Austria invited her to one of the races of the competition, where she finished fourth.

In her second season in the Swift Cup Europe, Keszthelyi finished third in the absolute and second in the junior category. In 2016, she was included into the Audi Sport Racing Academy at the age of fifteen among the three drivers chosen to be members of the academy.

Keszthelyi then competed in the Central European Zone Trophy with an Audi TT in 2016, earning herself a place in Audi's academy programme. In her first season, she became the D-2000 Hungarian national champion of both the sprint and the endurance category with race wins in both.

In 2017, Keszthelyi continued in the Audi TT Cup where she only completed seven out of thirteen races. She collected 65 points and finished 13th in the championship.

In 2018, Keszthelyi competed in the Audi Sport Seyffarth R8 LMS Cup with an Audi R8 LMS GT4. Over the course of the season, she collected three podiums, finishing runner-up in the overall standings and champion of the rookie category.

On 2 January 2019, it was confirmed that Keszthelyi would race in the F3 Asian Championship Winter Series. She scored 13 points and finished 13th.

Keszthelyi qualified for W Series as one of two reserve drivers. Keszthelyi replaced Emma Kimiläinen in the second round at Zolder and the third round at Misano, scoring her only point of the season in the latter. Normally a reserve driver, she was promoted to regular driver duties at Round 4 and Round 6.

In 2020, Keszthelyi tested the Dallara 320 with Carlin Motorsport and Motopark. In 2021, Keszthelyi competed in the Euroformula Open Championship with Motopark – she participated in the first four rounds of the championship before being replaced with Roman Staněk.

== Personal life ==
In 2026, Keszthelyi married long-time partner David Schumacher.

== Racing record ==
=== Career summary ===
Season	Series	Team	Races	Wins	Poles	F/Laps	Podiums	Points	Position
2014	Suzuki Swift Cup Europe	Oxxo Motorsport	?	?	?	?	?	?	6th
2015	Suzuki Swift Cup Europe	Oxxo Motorsport	?	?	?	?	?	?	**3rd**
2016	Central European Zone Trophy	Team VRS	?	?	?	?	?	?	**1st**
2017	Audi Sport TT Cup	N/A	11	0	0	0	0	65	13th
2018	Audi Sport Seyffarth R8 LMS Cup	Team VRS	12	0	0	0	3	129	**2nd**
2019	W Series	Hitech GP	4	0	0	0	0	1	17th
2019	F3 Asian Championship - Winter Series	BlackArts Racing Team	9	0	0	0	0	13	13th
2021	Euroformula Open Championship	Team Motopark	12	0	0	0	0	12	20th

* Season still in progress.

=== Complete Audi Sport Seyffarth R8 LMS Cup results ===
(key) (Races in bold indicate pole position) (Races in italics indicate fastest lap)

Year	Team	Category	1	2	3	4	5	6	7	8	9	10	11	12	Pos	Points
Year	Team	Category	HOC		LAU		HUN		BRA		MIS		NÜR		Pos	Points
2018	Team VRS	Absolute	3	3	4	4	4	2	7	4	4	6	11	4	**2nd**	**129**
2018	Team VRS	Rookie	2	2	3	3	2	1	2	2	2	4	4	3	**1st**	**154.5**

=== Complete F3 Asian Winter Series results ===
(key) (Races in bold indicate pole position) (Races in italics indicate fastest lap)

Year	Team	1	2	3	4	5	6	7	8	9	Pos	Points
2019	BlackArts Racing Team	CHA; 1; 8	CHA; 1; 11	CHA; 1; 9	SEP; 1; 9	SEP; 1; 11	SEP; 1; 10	SEP; 1 Ret	SEP; 1 Ret	SEP; 1; 10	13th	13

=== Complete W Series results ===
(key) (Races in bold indicate pole position) (Races in italics indicate fastest lap)

Year	Team	1	2	3	4	5	6	DC	Points
2019	Hitech GP	HOC; PO	ZOL; Ret	MIS; 10	NOR; 13	ASS; PO	BRH; 14	17th	1

=== Complete Euroformula Open Championship results ===
(key) (Races in bold indicate pole position; races in italics indicate points for the fastest lap of top ten finishers)

Year	Entrant	1	2	3	4	5	6	7	8	9	10	11	12	13	14	15	16	17	18	19	20	21	22	23	24	DC	Points
2021	Team Motopark	POR; 1; 10	POR; 2; 9	POR; 3; 12	LEC; 1; 10	LEC; 2; 11	LEC; 3; 11	SPA; 1; 8	SPA; 2; 10	SPA; 3; 10	HUN; 1; 11	HUN; 2; 9	HUN; 3 Ret	IMO; 1	IMO; 2	IMO; 3	RBR; 1	RBR; 2	RBR; 3	MNZ; 1	MNZ; 2	MNZ; 3	CAT; 1	CAT; 2	CAT; 3	20th	12
