= Josh Caygill =

British racing driver (born 1989)

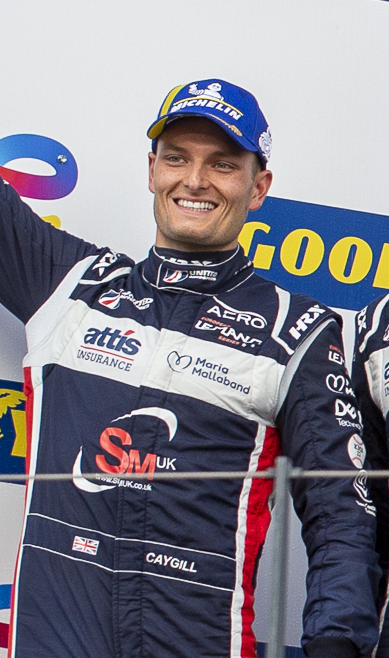
- Caygill on the podium of the 2022 4 Hours of Portimão
- Nationality: (United Kingdom) British
- Born: Joshua Caygill; 22 June 1989 (age 37) Dewsbury, England

FIA World Endurance Championship career
- Debut season: 2024
- Current team: United Autosports
- Categorisation: FIA Silver (until 2021); FIA Bronze (2022–)
- Car number: 95
- Starts: 7
- Wins: 0
- Poles: 0
- Fastest laps: 0
- Best finish: 18th in 2024
- Finished last season: 18th

Previous series
- 2022 2021 2018 2018 2017 2015–2017 2013–2014: European Le Mans Series; Porsche Carrera Cup Great Britain; British Touring Car Championship; Blancpain GT Series Sprint Cup; Blancpain GT Series Endurance Cup; Audi Sport TT Cup; VW Racing Cup

Joshua Caygill (born 22 June 1989) is a British racing driver and former motorcycle road racer. He has previously competed in the British Supersport Championship, the British Touring Car Championship, FIA World Endurance Championship and the European Le Mans Series.

== Racing record ==
=== Career summary ===
Season	Series	Team	Races	Wins	Poles	F/Laps	Podiums	Points	Position
2013	Volkswagen Racing Cup Great Britain		14	0	0	0	0	296	9th
2014	Volkswagen Scirocco R-Cup		9	0	0	0	0	89	17th
2014	Miltek Sport Volkswagen Racing Cup		13	0	0	0	0	292	8th
2015	Audi Sport TT Cup		12	0	0	0	0	103	10th
2016	Audi Sport TT Cup		14	0	0	0	0	117	10th
2016	VLN Langstrecken Serie - BMW M235i Cup		-	-	-	-	-	10	39th
2017	24H Series	Slidesports Pallex	1	0	0	0	0	0	16th
2017	Blancpain GT Series Endurance Cup - Pro	Team WRT	2	0	0	0	0	0	NC
2017	Blancpain GT Series Endurance Cup - Pro/Am	Team WRT	3	0	0	0	0	4	38th
2017	Intercontinental GT Challenge	Team WRT	1	0	0	0	0	0	NC
2017	Audi Sport TT Cup		4	0	0	0	0	40	15th
2018	24H TCE Series	Sorg Rennsport	1	0	0	0	1	N/A	NC
2018	Blancpain GT Series Sprint Cup - Overall	Team Parker Racing	6	0	0	0	0	0	NC
2018	Blancpain GT Series Sprint Cup - Silver	Team Parker Racing	6	0	0	0	0	33	9th
2018	British Touring Car Championship	AmD with AutoAid/RCIB Insurance Racing	5	0	0	0	0	0	41st
2019	VLN Series	Walkenhorst Motorsport	1	0	0	0	0	4.38	30th
2021	Porsche Carrera Cup Great Britain	Redline Racing	12	0	0	0	0	33	6th
2022	European Le Mans Series	United Autosports	6	0	0	0	2	48	8th
2023	Le Mans Cup	Murphy Prototypes	2	0	1	0	0	2	30th
2024	FIA World Endurance Championship	United Autosports	7	0	1	0	1	36	18th
2024	GT World Challenge Europe Endurance Cup	RJN Motorsport	1	0	0	0	1	N/A	N/A
2024	British GT Championship	RJN Motorsport	1	1	1	0	1	N/A	N/A
2024	Le Mans Cup	Steller Motorsport	1	0	0	0	0	N/A	**N/A**

=== British Supersport Championship ===
==== Races by year ====
(key) (Races in bold indicate pole position, races in italics indicate fastest lap)

Year	Bike	1		2		3		4		5		6		7		8		9		10		11		12		Pos	Pts
Year	Bike	R1	R2	R1	R2	R1	R2	R1	R2	R1	R2	R1	R2	R1	R2	R1	R2	R1	R2	R1	R2	R1	R2	R1	R2	Pos	Pts
2012	Triumph	BHI; 16	BHI; Ret	THR; 22	THR; 22	OUL; 23	OUL; 21	SNE; 22	SNE; 12	KNO; 21	KNO; 16	OUL; 20	OUL; 23	BHGP; 22	BHGP; 19	CAD; 16	CAD; 16	DON; 14	DON; Ret	ASS	ASS	SIL	SIL	BHGP	BHGP	30th	6

=== Complete Blancpain GT Series Sprint Cup results ===
Year	Team	Car	Class	1	2	3	4	5	6	7	8	9	10	Pos.	Points
2018	Team Parker Racing	Bentley Continental GT3	Silver	ZOL; 1; 18	ZOL; 2; 16	BRH; 1; 15	BRH; 2 Ret	MIS; 1; 15	MIS; 2 Ret	HUN; 1	HUN; 2	NÜR; 1	NÜR; 2	9th	33

=== Complete British Touring Car Championship results ===
(key) (Races in bold indicate pole position – 1 point awarded just in first race; races in italics indicate fastest lap – 1 point awarded all races; * signifies that driver led race for at least one lap – 1 point given all races)

Year	Team	Car	1	2	3	4	5	6	7	8	9	10	11	12	13	14	15	16	17	18	19	20	21	22	23	24	25	26	27	28	29	30	DC	Pts
2018	AmD with AutoAid RCIB Insurance Racing	MG 6 GT	BRH; 1	BRH; 2	BRH; 3	DON; 1	DON; 2	DON; 3	THR; 1	THR; 2	THR; 3	OUL; 1	OUL; 2	OUL; 3	CRO; 1	CRO; 2	CRO; 3	SNE; 1	SNE; 2	SNE; 3	ROC; 1	ROC; 2	ROC; 3	KNO; 1	KNO; 2	KNO; 3	SIL; 1; 23	SIL; 2 NC	SIL; 3 Ret	BRH; 1; 26	BRH; 2; 21	BRH; 3 Ret	40th	0

=== Complete European Le Mans Series results ===
(key) (Races in bold indicate pole position; results in italics indicate fastest lap)

Year	Entrant	Class	Chassis	Engine	1	2	3	4	5	6	Rank	Points
2022	United Autosports	LMP3	Ligier JS P320	Nissan VK56DE 5.6L V8	LEC; 2	IMO; Ret	MNZ; 5	CAT; 9	SPA; Ret	ALG; 2	9th	48

=== Complete FIA World Endurance Championship results ===
(key) (Races in bold indicate pole position) (Races in italics indicate fastest lap)

Year	Entrant	Class	Car	Engine	1	2	3	4	5	6	7	8	Rank	Points
2024	United Autosports	LMGT3	McLaren 720S GT3 Evo	McLaren M840T 4.0 L Turbo V8	QAT; 13	IMO; 6	SPA; Ret	LMS	SÃO; 3	COA; 7	FUJ; 17	**BHR**; 8	18th	36
