= Fabian Vettel =

German racing driver

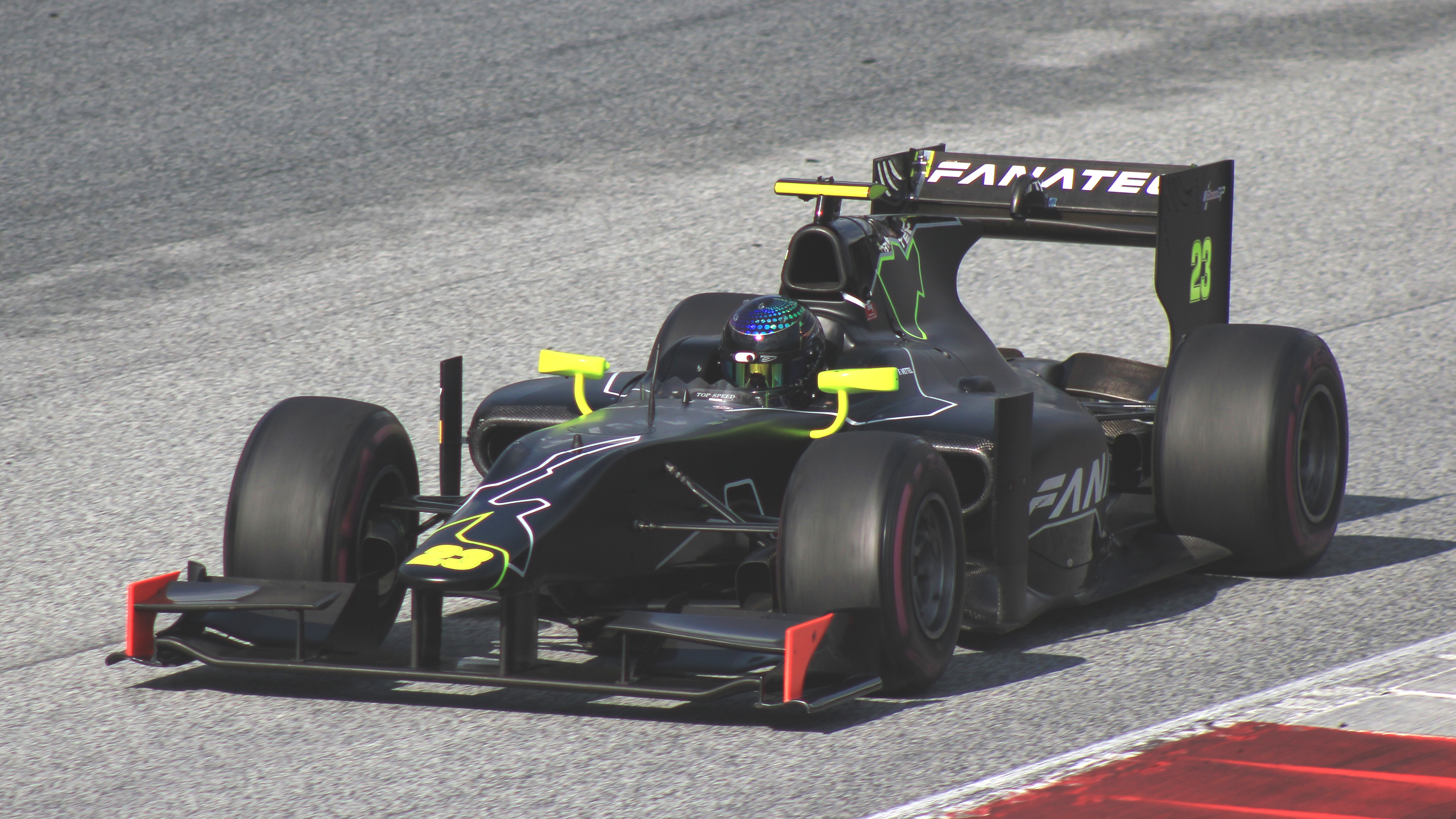
- Vettel driving a Dallara GP2/11 in the 2023 BOSS GP Series.
- Nationality: (Germany) German
- Born: 10 December 1998 (age 27) Heppenheim, Hesse, Germany
- Relatives: Sebastian Vettel (brother)

ADAC GT4 Germany career
- Debut season: 2021
- Current team: W&S Motorsport
- Starts: 2
- Wins: 0
- Podiums: 0
- Poles: 0
- Fastest laps: 0

Previous series
- 2019 2018 2017: ADAC GT Masters; Lamborghini Super Trofeo Europe; Audi Sport TT Cup

Fabian Vettel (born 10 December 1998) is a German racing driver who last competed in the 2025 Nürburgring Langstrecken-Serie. He is also a brand ambassador of the sim racing company Racing Unleashed.

== Career ==
Vettel started karting at the age of 16.

In 2017 Vettel made his car racing debut by competing in the Audi Sport TT Cup. He took his maiden podium at the Nürburgring and finished the season as ninth in the drivers' championship.

In 2018, Vettel joined Konrad Motorsport to compete in the Lamborghini Super Trofeo Europe.

In 2019, Vettel competed in the ADAC GT Masters for Mann-Filter Team HTP. Together with his teammate Philip Ellis, he took his maiden podium at Circuit Zandvoort. The duo finished the season in twenty-first. That year, he also joined GetSpeed Performance to compete in the 24 Hours of Nürburgring. Together with his teammates Philip Ellis, Luca Ludwig and Jules Szymkowiak he finished the race in sixth overall.

In 2021, Vettel joined W&S Motorsport for the Hockenheimring round of the ADAC GT4 Germany. The Porsche 718 Cayman GT4 Clubsport he drove utilized the Space Drive System, developed by Schaeffler Paravan. He had previously tested the system in early 2020.

Vettel made his open-wheel debut in the BOSS GP series at the Red Bull Ring driving a Dallara GP2/11 for Top Speed. He took third place in the Formula Class in both races.

== Personal life ==
Fabian is the younger brother of Formula One Drivers' Champion Sebastian Vettel. He also has two older sisters. Fabian Vettel grew up in Heppenheim. He moved to Augsburg for his real estate studies.

== Racing record ==
=== Career summary ===
Season	Series	Team	Races	Wins	Poles	F/Laps	Podiums	Points	Position
2017	Audi Sport TT Cup	Audi Sport GmbH	13	0	0	0	1	122	9th
2018	Lamborghini Super Trofeo Europe - Pro	Konrad Motorsport	4	0	0	0	1	?	?
2018	Lamborghini Super Trofeo Europe - Pro-Am	Konrad Motorsport	6	0	0	0	0	?	?
2018	Lamborghini Super Trofeo Europe - Am	Konrad Motorsport	2	0	0	0	0	?	?
2018	Lamborghini Super Trofeo World Final - Pro	Konrad Motorsport	2	0	0	0	0	3	12th
2019	ADAC GT Masters	Mann-Filter Team HTP	13	0	0	0	1	40	21st
2019	24 Hours of Nürburgring - SP9	GetSpeed Performance	1	0	0	0	0	N/A	6th
2021	ADAC GT4 Germany	W&S Motorsport	2	0	0	0	0	0	NC
2023	BOSS GP - Formula Class	Top Speed	4	0	0	0	2	60	7th
2024	Nürburgring Langstrecken-Serie - SP11	Dörr Motorsport							
2024	24 Hours of Nürburgring - SP11	Dörr Motorsport							
2025	Nürburgring Langstrecken-Serie - AT3	Max Kruse Racing							
2026	Nürburgring Langstrecken-Serie - SP4T	Max Kruse Racing							

=== Complete BOSS GP Series results ===
(key) (Races in bold indicate pole position; races in italics indicate points for the fastest lap of top ten finishers)

Year	Entrant	Car	Class	1	2	3	4	5	6	7	8	9	10	11	12	13	14	DC	Points
2023	Top Speed	Dallara GP2/11	Formula	HOC; 1; 4	HOC; 2; 6	LEC; 1; 3	LEC; 2; 2	RBR; 1; 6	RBR; 2; 4	MIS; 1; 6	MIS; 2 DNS	ASS; 1	ASS; 2	MNZ; 1	MNZ; 2	MUG; 1	MUG; 2	7th	60
