= 2017 Audi Sport TT Cup =

The 2017 Audi Sport TT Cup was the third and the final season of the Audi Sport TT Cup. It began on 6 May at Hockenheim and finished on 15 October at Hockenheim after seven double-header meetings, all of which were support events for the Deutsche Tourenwagen Masters and 24 Hours Nürburgring.

== Drivers ==
No.	Driver	Rounds
Permanent Entries
2	(United Kingdom) Finlay Hutchison	1–3
3	(Poland) Gosia Rdest	All
4	(Australia) Drew Ridge	All
5	(Liechtenstein) Fabienne Wohlwend	All
7	(Hungary) Vivien Keszthelyi	All
8	(Switzerland) Yannik Brandt	All
9	(Germany) Mike Beckhusen	1–5
11	(Italy) Tommaso Mosca	All
14	(United Kingdom) Josh Caygill	6–7
15	(United Kingdom) Jack Manchester	1–3
17	(South Africa) Keagan Masters	1–4, 6–7
23	(United Kingdom) Philip Ellis	All
24	(Germany) Simon Wirth	All
25	(Spain) Mikel Azcona	All
31	(Germany) Kevin Arnold	All
43	(Netherlands) Milan Dontje	All
55	(Germany) Fabian Vettel	All
Guest Entries
96	(Germany) Roman Wittemeier	4
97	(Germany) Linus Straßer	3
97	(Germany) Daniel Rösner	4
97	(Italy) Marco Melandri	5
98	(France) Benoît Tréluyer	1
98	(Venezuela) Johnny Cecotto, Sr.	2
98	(Germany) Daniel Geradtz	3
98	(Netherlands) Bernhard van Oranje	4
98	(Germany) Matthias Dolderer	5
98	(Austria) Max Franz	6
98	(Germany) Daniel Grunenberg	7
99	(United Kingdom) James Taylor	1
99	(Germany) Sönke Brederlow	2
99	(Netherlands) Giedo van der Garde	4
99	(Germany) Felix von der Laden	5
99	(Austria) Benjamin Raich	6
99	(Germany) "Mr. Goodlife"	7

== Race calendar and results ==
Round		Circuit	Date	Pole position	Fastest lap	Winning driver
1	R1	(Germany) Hockenheimring, Baden-Württemberg (Grand Prix Circuit)	5 May	(Switzerland) Yannik Brandt	(United Kingdom) Philip Ellis	(United Kingdom) Philip Ellis
1	R2	(Germany) Hockenheimring, Baden-Württemberg (Grand Prix Circuit)	6 May	(Netherlands) Milan Dontje	(United Kingdom) Philip Ellis	(United Kingdom) Philip Ellis
2	R1	(Germany) Nürburgring, Rhineland-Palatinate (Grand Prix Circuit)	27 May	(Spain) Mikel Azcona	Race abandoned before half-distance	
2	R2	(Germany) Nürburgring, Rhineland-Palatinate (Grand Prix Circuit)	28 May	(United Kingdom) Philip Ellis	(Spain) Mikel Azcona	(United Kingdom) Philip Ellis
3	R1	(Germany) Norisring, Nuremberg	1 July	(Spain) Mikel Azcona	(Spain) Mikel Azcona	(Spain) Mikel Azcona
3	R2	(Germany) Norisring, Nuremberg	2 July	(Spain) Mikel Azcona	(Spain) Mikel Azcona	(Spain) Mikel Azcona
4	R1	(Netherlands) Circuit Park Zandvoort, North Holland	19 August	(United Kingdom) Philip Ellis	(United Kingdom) Philip Ellis	(United Kingdom) Philip Ellis
4	R2	(Netherlands) Circuit Park Zandvoort, North Holland	20 August	(Italy) Tommaso Mosca	(Spain) Mikel Azcona	(Spain) Mikel Azcona
5	R1	(Germany) Nürburgring, Rhineland-Palatinate (Sprint Circuit)	10 September	(Spain) Mikel Azcona	(Spain) Mikel Azcona	(Spain) Mikel Azcona
5	R2	(Germany) Nürburgring, Rhineland-Palatinate (Sprint Circuit)	11 September	(Spain) Mikel Azcona	(Spain) Mikel Azcona	(Spain) Mikel Azcona
6	R1	(Austria) Red Bull Ring, Spielberg	23 September	(Spain) Mikel Azcona	(Netherlands) Milan Dontje	(South Africa) Keagan Masters
6	R2	(Austria) Red Bull Ring, Spielberg	24 September	(South Africa) Keagan Masters	(Spain) Mikel Azcona	(South Africa) Keagan Masters
7	R1	(Germany) Hockenheimring, Baden-Württemberg (Grand Prix Circuit)	14 October	(United Kingdom) Philip Ellis	(South Africa) Keagan Masters	(United Kingdom) Philip Ellis
7	R2	(Germany) Hockenheimring, Baden-Württemberg (Grand Prix Circuit)	15 October	(United Kingdom) Philip Ellis	(Germany) Simon Wirth	(Spain) Mikel Azcona

== Championship standings ==
Scoring system

Points were awarded to the top eighteen classified finishers as follows:

Position	**1st**	**2nd**	**3rd**	**4th**	**5th**	**6th**	**7th**	**8th**	**9th**	**10th**	**11th**	**12th**	**13th**	**14th**	**15th**	**16th**	**17th**	**18th**
Points	25	21	18	16	14	13	12	11	10	9	8	7	6	5	4	3	2	1

=== Drivers' championship ===
Pos.	Driver	HOC (Germany)		NÜR (Germany)		NOR (Germany)		ZAN (Netherlands)		NÜR (Germany)		RBR (Austria)		HOC (Germany)		Points
1	(United Kingdom) Philip Ellis	1	1	C	**1**	2	3	**1**	2	Ret	5	2	3	**1**	**2**	259
2	(Spain) Mikel Azcona	Ret	10	**C**	2	**1**	**1**	2	1	**1**	**1**	**Ret**	7	2	1	235
3	(Italy) Tommaso Mosca	7	5	C	11	5	2	3	**5**	4	2	4	4	11	5	196
4	(Netherlands) Milan Dontje	4	**6**	C	3	3	5	7	4	5	Ret	3	2	4	4	193
5	(Australia) Drew Ridge	12	11	C	6	10	Ret	8	6	3	4	7	8	5	3	153
6	(Poland) Gosia Rdest	2	2	C	4	6	Ret	4	13	8	6	Ret	10	6	10	149
7	(South Africa) Keagan Masters	6	7	C	15	Ret	4	5	3			1	**1**	3	Ret	148
8	(Switzerland) Yannik Brandt	**3**	9	C	5	4	11	6	Ret	6	7	5	9	Ret	8	141
9	(Germany) Fabian Vettel	13	8	C	14	7	10	9	10	2	8	Ret	6	10	Ret	122
10	(Germany) Simon Wirth	DNS	DNS	C	9	9	7	14	8	7	9	11	Ret	7	7	105
11	(Liechtenstein) Fabienne Wohlwend	8	12	C	13	12	Ret	13	11	11	Ret	9	11	9	9	97
12	(Germany) Kevin Arnold	Ret	Ret	C	10	14	Ret	10	9	Ret	3	8	14	Ret	Ret	71
13	(Hungary) Vivien Keszthelyi	DNS	Ret	C	DNS	Ret	8	11	12	9	Ret	10	Ret	8	12	65
14	(Germany) Mike Beckhusen	Ret	13	C	8	8	6	Ret	Ret	13	Ret					51
15	(United Kingdom) Josh Caygill											6	5	Ret	6	40
16	(United Kingdom) Finlay Hutchison	9	3	C	Ret	11	Ret									37
17	(United Kingdom) Jack Manchester	11	15	C	12	13	Ret									30
Guest drivers ineligible for championship points
	(France) Benoît Tréluyer	5	4													0
	(Venezuela) Johnny Cecotto, Sr.			C	7											0
	(Netherlands) Giedo van der Garde							12	7							0
	(Germany) Linus Straßer					Ret	9									0
	(United Kingdom) James Taylor	10	14													0
	(Italy) Marco Melandri									10	Ret					0
	(Germany) Felix von der Laden									12	10					0
	(Germany) “Mr. Goodlife”													12	11	0
	(Germany) Matthias Dolderer									14	11					0
	(Austria) Max Franz											12	12			0
	(Austria) Benjamin Raich											13	13			0
	(Germany) Daniel Rösner							15	14							0
	(Germany) Roman Wittemeier							16	15							0
	(Germany) Sönke Brederlow			C	16											0
	(Germany) Daniel Grunenberg													Ret	Ret	0
	(Netherlands) Bernhard van Oranje							Ret	DNS							0
	(Germany) Daniel Geradtz					DNS	DNQ									0
Pos.	Driver	HOC (Germany)		NÜR (Germany)		NOR (Germany)		ZAN (Netherlands)		NÜR (Germany)		RBR (Austria)		HOC (Germany)		Points

Colour	Result
Gold	Winner
Silver	Second place
Bronze	Third place
Green	Points classification
Blue	Non-points classification
Blue	Non-classified finish (NC)
Purple	Retired, not classified (Ret)
Red	Did not qualify (DNQ)
Red	Did not pre-qualify (DNPQ)
Black	Disqualified (DSQ)
White	Did not start (DNS)
White	Withdrew (WD)
White	Race cancelled (C)
Blank	Did not practice (DNP)
Blank	Did not arrive (DNA)
Blank	Excluded (EX)

**Bold** – Pole
Italics – Fastest Lap

==== Non-Championship 'Legends Race' ====
At the final round of the championship in Hockenheim, a non-championship "Legends Race" took place in which drivers with 'legendary' connections took over the series regulars' cars for a 12 lap race.

Pos.	No.	Driver	Grid	Time/Retired
1	17	(Germany) Frank Stippler	1	12 Laps
2	25	(Brazil) Lucas di Grassi	10	+0.821
3	7	(Switzerland) Marcel Fässler	11	+6.174
4	11	(Italy) Emanuele Pirro	12	+12.419
5	55	(Italy) Rinaldo Capello	8	+12.916
6	8	(France) Jean-Marc Gounon	16	+15.903
7	3	(Belgium) Vanina Ickx	15	+19.719
8	44	(Germany) Hans-Joachim Stuck	14	+20.519
9	43	(Germany) Lucas Luhr	9	+2 laps
Ret	31	(Germany) Marco Werner	6	Crash damage
Ret	24	(Germany) Christian Abt	13	Puncture
Ret	5	(Switzerland) Rahel Frey	7	Crash damage
Ret	9	(Monaco) Stéphane Ortelli	5	Crash
Ret	4	(Germany) Frank Biela	2	Crash damage
Ret	14	(Denmark) Tom Kristensen	3	Crash
Ret	23	(Portugal) Filipe Albuquerque	4	Crash
