= 2017 Blancpain GT Series Endurance Cup =

Sports season

The 2017 Blancpain GT Series Endurance Cup was the seventh season of the Blancpain GT Series Endurance Cup. The season began on 23 April at Monza and ended on 1 October in Barcelona. The season featured five rounds, with each race lasting for a duration of three hours besides the 24 Hours of Spa and the 1000 km Paul Ricard events.

== Calendar ==
At the annual press conference during the 2016 24 Hours of Spa on 29 July, the Stéphane Ratel Organisation announced the first draft of the 2017 calendar. The Sprint Cup round in Barcelona became an Endurance Cup round, replacing the round at the Nürburgring.

Event	Race	Circuit	Date	Report
1	3 Hours of Monza	Autodromo Nazionale Monza, Monza, Italy	23 April	Report
2	3 Hours of Silverstone	(United Kingdom) Silverstone Circuit, Silverstone, Great Britain	14 May	Report
3	1000 km Paul Ricard	Circuit Paul Ricard, Le Castellet, France	24 June	Report
4	Total 24 Hours of Spa	Circuit de Spa-Francorchamps, Spa, Belgium	29–30 July	Report
5	3 Hours of Barcelona	Circuit de Barcelona-Catalunya, Montmeló, Spain	1 October	Report

== Entry list ==
Team	Car	No.	Drivers	Class	Rounds
(Japan) Good Smile Racing with Team UKYO	Mercedes-AMG GT3	00	(Japan) Tatsuya Kataoka	P	4
(Japan) Good Smile Racing with Team UKYO	Mercedes-AMG GT3	00	(Japan) Kamui Kobayashi	P	4
(Japan) Good Smile Racing with Team UKYO	Mercedes-AMG GT3	00	(Japan) Nobuteru Taniguchi	P	4
(Belgium) / Audi Sport Team WRT (Note: Car No. 1 entered as Audi Sport Team WRT. Car No. 2 entered as Belgian Audi Club Team WRT at Rounds 1, 2 and 5, but entered as Audi Sport Team WRT at Rounds 3 and 4. Car No. 5 entered as Belgian Audi Club Team WRT at Rounds 1 to 3 and 5, but entered as Audi Sport Team WRT at Round 4. Car No. 6 entered as Belgian Audi Club Team WRT at Round 3, but entered as Team WRT at Round 4. Cars No. 3 and 17 entered as Team WRT.); (Belgium) / Belgian Audi Club Team WRT; (Belgium) / Team WRT	Audi R8 LMS	1	(Spain) Antonio García	P	3–4
(Belgium) / Audi Sport Team WRT; (Belgium) / Belgian Audi Club Team WRT; (Belgium) / Team WRT	Audi R8 LMS	1	(Switzerland) Nico Müller	P	3–4
(Belgium) / Audi Sport Team WRT; (Belgium) / Belgian Audi Club Team WRT; (Belgium) / Team WRT	Audi R8 LMS	1	(Germany) René Rast	P	3–4
(Belgium) / Audi Sport Team WRT; (Belgium) / Belgian Audi Club Team WRT; (Belgium) / Team WRT	Audi R8 LMS	2	(France) Nathanaël Berthon	P	1–2, 5
(Belgium) / Audi Sport Team WRT; (Belgium) / Belgian Audi Club Team WRT; (Belgium) / Team WRT	Audi R8 LMS	2	(Monaco) Stéphane Richelmi	P	1–2, 5
(Belgium) / Audi Sport Team WRT; (Belgium) / Belgian Audi Club Team WRT; (Belgium) / Team WRT	Audi R8 LMS	2	(France) Benoît Tréluyer	P	1–2, 5
(Belgium) / Audi Sport Team WRT; (Belgium) / Belgian Audi Club Team WRT; (Belgium) / Team WRT	Audi R8 LMS	2	(Germany) Christopher Mies	P	3–4
(Belgium) / Audi Sport Team WRT; (Belgium) / Belgian Audi Club Team WRT; (Belgium) / Team WRT	Audi R8 LMS	2	(Belgium) Frédéric Vervisch	P	3–4
(Belgium) / Audi Sport Team WRT; (Belgium) / Belgian Audi Club Team WRT; (Belgium) / Team WRT	Audi R8 LMS	2	(Netherlands) Pieter Schothorst	P	3
(Belgium) / Audi Sport Team WRT; (Belgium) / Belgian Audi Club Team WRT; (Belgium) / Team WRT	Audi R8 LMS	2	(United States) Connor De Phillippi	P	4
(Belgium) / Audi Sport Team WRT; (Belgium) / Belgian Audi Club Team WRT; (Belgium) / Team WRT	Audi R8 LMS	3	(United Kingdom) Josh Caygill	P	1–2
(Belgium) / Audi Sport Team WRT; (Belgium) / Belgian Audi Club Team WRT; (Belgium) / Team WRT	Audi R8 LMS	3	(Australia) Jonathan Venter	P	1–2
(Belgium) / Audi Sport Team WRT; (Belgium) / Belgian Audi Club Team WRT; (Belgium) / Team WRT	Audi R8 LMS	3	(Austria) Nikolaus Mayr-Melnhof	P	1–2
(Belgium) / Audi Sport Team WRT; (Belgium) / Belgian Audi Club Team WRT; (Belgium) / Team WRT	Audi R8 LMS	3	(United Kingdom) Josh Caygill	PA	3–5
(Belgium) / Audi Sport Team WRT; (Belgium) / Belgian Audi Club Team WRT; (Belgium) / Team WRT	Audi R8 LMS	3	(Australia) Jonathan Venter	PA	3–5
(Belgium) / Audi Sport Team WRT; (Belgium) / Belgian Audi Club Team WRT; (Belgium) / Team WRT	Audi R8 LMS	3	(Switzerland) Hugo de Sadeleer	PA	3
(Belgium) / Audi Sport Team WRT; (Belgium) / Belgian Audi Club Team WRT; (Belgium) / Team WRT	Audi R8 LMS	3	(United Kingdom) Richard Lyons	PA	4
(Belgium) / Audi Sport Team WRT; (Belgium) / Belgian Audi Club Team WRT; (Belgium) / Team WRT	Audi R8 LMS	3	(Austria) Nikolaus Mayr-Melnhof	PA	4
(Belgium) / Audi Sport Team WRT; (Belgium) / Belgian Audi Club Team WRT; (Belgium) / Team WRT	Audi R8 LMS	3	(France) Clément Mateu	PA	5
(Belgium) / Audi Sport Team WRT; (Belgium) / Belgian Audi Club Team WRT; (Belgium) / Team WRT	Audi R8 LMS	5	(Switzerland) Marcel Fässler	P	All
(Belgium) / Audi Sport Team WRT; (Belgium) / Belgian Audi Club Team WRT; (Belgium) / Team WRT	Audi R8 LMS	5	(Belgium) Dries Vanthoor	P	All
(Belgium) / Audi Sport Team WRT; (Belgium) / Belgian Audi Club Team WRT; (Belgium) / Team WRT	Audi R8 LMS	5	(United Kingdom) Will Stevens	P	1–3, 5
(Belgium) / Audi Sport Team WRT; (Belgium) / Belgian Audi Club Team WRT; (Belgium) / Team WRT	Audi R8 LMS	5	(Germany) André Lotterer	P	4
(Belgium) / Audi Sport Team WRT; (Belgium) / Belgian Audi Club Team WRT; (Belgium) / Team WRT	Audi R8 LMS	6	(France) Nathanaël Berthon	P	3–4
(Belgium) / Audi Sport Team WRT; (Belgium) / Belgian Audi Club Team WRT; (Belgium) / Team WRT	Audi R8 LMS	6	(Monaco) Stéphane Richelmi	P	3–4
(Belgium) / Audi Sport Team WRT; (Belgium) / Belgian Audi Club Team WRT; (Belgium) / Team WRT	Audi R8 LMS	6	(France) Benoît Tréluyer	P	3–4
(Belgium) / Audi Sport Team WRT; (Belgium) / Belgian Audi Club Team WRT; (Belgium) / Team WRT	Audi R8 LMS	17	(United Kingdom) Jake Dennis	P	All
(Belgium) / Audi Sport Team WRT; (Belgium) / Belgian Audi Club Team WRT; (Belgium) / Team WRT	Audi R8 LMS	17	(United Kingdom) Stuart Leonard	P	All
(Belgium) / Audi Sport Team WRT; (Belgium) / Belgian Audi Club Team WRT; (Belgium) / Team WRT	Audi R8 LMS	17	(Germany) Markus Winkelhock	P	1
(Belgium) / Audi Sport Team WRT; (Belgium) / Belgian Audi Club Team WRT; (Belgium) / Team WRT	Audi R8 LMS	17	(United Kingdom) Jamie Green	P	2, 4
(Belgium) / Audi Sport Team WRT; (Belgium) / Belgian Audi Club Team WRT; (Belgium) / Team WRT	Audi R8 LMS	17	(Netherlands) Robin Frijns	P	3, 5
(Germany) / Mercedes-AMG Team Black Falcon (Note: Car No. 4 entered as Mercedes-AMG Team Black Falcon at Rounds 1 to 3 and 5, but entered as Black Falcon at Round 4. Cars No. 15, 16 and 18 entered as Black Falcon.); (Germany) / Black Falcon	Mercedes-AMG GT3	4	(Netherlands) Yelmer Buurman	P	All
(Germany) / Mercedes-AMG Team Black Falcon; (Germany) / Black Falcon	Mercedes-AMG GT3	4	(United Kingdom) Adam Christodoulou	P	All
(Germany) / Mercedes-AMG Team Black Falcon; (Germany) / Black Falcon	Mercedes-AMG GT3	4	(Germany) Luca Stolz	P	All
(Germany) / Mercedes-AMG Team Black Falcon; (Germany) / Black Falcon	Mercedes-AMG GT3	15	(United States) Dore Chaponick Jr.	PA	All
(Germany) / Mercedes-AMG Team Black Falcon; (Germany) / Black Falcon	Mercedes-AMG GT3	15	(United States) Scott Heckert	PA	All
(Germany) / Mercedes-AMG Team Black Falcon; (Germany) / Black Falcon	Mercedes-AMG GT3	15	(United States) Brett Sandberg	PA	All
(Germany) / Mercedes-AMG Team Black Falcon; (Germany) / Black Falcon	Mercedes-AMG GT3	15	(Netherlands) Jeroen Bleekemolen	PA	4
(Germany) / Mercedes-AMG Team Black Falcon; (Germany) / Black Falcon	Mercedes-AMG GT3	16	(United Kingdom) Oliver Morley	PA	All
(Germany) / Mercedes-AMG Team Black Falcon; (Germany) / Black Falcon	Mercedes-AMG GT3	16	(Spain) Miguel Toril	PA	All
(Germany) / Mercedes-AMG Team Black Falcon; (Germany) / Black Falcon	Mercedes-AMG GT3	16	(Germany) Manuel Metzger	PA	1–2
(Germany) / Mercedes-AMG Team Black Falcon; (Germany) / Black Falcon	Mercedes-AMG GT3	16	(Republic of Ireland) Matt Griffin	PA	3
(Germany) / Mercedes-AMG Team Black Falcon; (Germany) / Black Falcon	Mercedes-AMG GT3	16	(Germany) Marvin Kirchhöfer	PA	4–5
(Germany) / Mercedes-AMG Team Black Falcon; (Germany) / Black Falcon	Mercedes-AMG GT3	16	(Germany) Maximilian Götz	PA	4
(Germany) / Mercedes-AMG Team Black Falcon; (Germany) / Black Falcon	Mercedes-AMG GT3	18	(Germany) Maro Engel	P	3
(Germany) / Mercedes-AMG Team Black Falcon; (Germany) / Black Falcon	Mercedes-AMG GT3	18	(Germany) Hubert Haupt	P	3
(Germany) / Mercedes-AMG Team Black Falcon; (Germany) / Black Falcon	Mercedes-AMG GT3	18	(Italy) Gabriele Piana	P	3
(Germany) / Mercedes-AMG Team Black Falcon; (Germany) / Black Falcon	Mercedes-AMG GT3	18	(Saudi Arabia) Abdulaziz Bin Turki Al Faisal	PA	4
(Germany) / Mercedes-AMG Team Black Falcon; (Germany) / Black Falcon	Mercedes-AMG GT3	18	(Germany) Hubert Haupt	PA	4
(Germany) / Mercedes-AMG Team Black Falcon; (Germany) / Black Falcon	Mercedes-AMG GT3	18	(Italy) Gabriele Piana	PA	4
(Germany) / Mercedes-AMG Team Black Falcon; (Germany) / Black Falcon	Mercedes-AMG GT3	18	(Netherlands) Renger van der Zande	PA	4
(United Kingdom) Bentley Team M-Sport	Bentley Continental GT3	7	(United Kingdom) Oliver Jarvis	P	All
(United Kingdom) Bentley Team M-Sport	Bentley Continental GT3	7	(United Kingdom) Steven Kane	P	All
(United Kingdom) Bentley Team M-Sport	Bentley Continental GT3	7	(United Kingdom) Guy Smith	P	All
(United Kingdom) Bentley Team M-Sport	Bentley Continental GT3	8	(Monaco) Vincent Abril	P	All
(United Kingdom) Bentley Team M-Sport	Bentley Continental GT3	8	(Spain) Andy Soucek	P	All
(United Kingdom) Bentley Team M-Sport	Bentley Continental GT3	8	(Belgium) Maxime Soulet	P	All
(Germany) Bentley Team ABT	Bentley Continental GT3	9	(Germany) Christer Jöns	P	4
(Germany) Bentley Team ABT	Bentley Continental GT3	9	(South Africa) Jordan Pepper	P	4
(Germany) Bentley Team ABT	Bentley Continental GT3	9	(Belgium) Nico Verdonck	P	4
(Switzerland) Kessel Racing	Ferrari 488 GT3	11	(Poland) Michał Broniszewski	PA	All
(Switzerland) Kessel Racing	Ferrari 488 GT3	11	(Italy) Matteo Cressoni	PA	1–4
(Switzerland) Kessel Racing	Ferrari 488 GT3	11	(Italy) Andrea Rizzoli	PA	1–4
(Switzerland) Kessel Racing	Ferrari 488 GT3	11	(Italy) Giacomo Piccini	PA	4–5
(Switzerland) Kessel Racing	Ferrari 488 GT3	888	(Belgium) Jacques Duyver	Am	All
(Switzerland) Kessel Racing	Ferrari 488 GT3	888	(South Africa) David Perel	Am	All
(Switzerland) Kessel Racing	Ferrari 488 GT3	888	(Italy) Marco Zanuttini	Am	All
(Switzerland) Kessel Racing	Ferrari 488 GT3	888	(Italy) Niki Cadei	Am	4
(Italy) Ombra Racing	Lamborghini Huracán GT3	12	(Italy) Michele Beretta	P	All
(Italy) Ombra Racing	Lamborghini Huracán GT3	12	(Italy) Stefano Gattuso	P	All
(Italy) Ombra Racing	Lamborghini Huracán GT3	12	(Italy) Andrea Piccini	P	All
(Switzerland) Emil Frey Jaguar Racing	Emil Frey GT3 Jaguar	14	(Monaco) Stéphane Ortelli	P	All
(Switzerland) Emil Frey Jaguar Racing	Emil Frey GT3 Jaguar	14	(Spain) Albert Costa	P	1–4
(Switzerland) Emil Frey Jaguar Racing	Emil Frey GT3 Jaguar	14	(Switzerland) Lorenz Frey	P	1–4
(Switzerland) Emil Frey Jaguar Racing	Emil Frey GT3 Jaguar	14	(Switzerland) Alex Fontana	P	5
(Switzerland) Emil Frey Jaguar Racing	Emil Frey GT3 Jaguar	14	(Austria) Norbert Siedler	P	5
(Switzerland) Emil Frey Jaguar Racing	Emil Frey GT3 Jaguar	114	(Switzerland) Jonathan Hirschi	P	All
(Switzerland) Emil Frey Jaguar Racing	Emil Frey GT3 Jaguar	114	(Austria) Christian Klien	P	All
(Switzerland) Emil Frey Jaguar Racing	Emil Frey GT3 Jaguar	114	(Germany) Marco Seefried	P	All
(Austria) GRT Grasser Racing Team	Lamborghini Huracán GT3	19	(Argentina) Ezequiel Pérez Companc	P	All
(Austria) GRT Grasser Racing Team	Lamborghini Huracán GT3	19	(Italy) Raffaele Giammaria	P	1–4
(Austria) GRT Grasser Racing Team	Lamborghini Huracán GT3	19	(Austria) Norbert Siedler	P	1–3
(Austria) GRT Grasser Racing Team	Lamborghini Huracán GT3	19	(Switzerland) Rolf Ineichen	P	4
(Austria) GRT Grasser Racing Team	Lamborghini Huracán GT3	19	(Belgium) Frédéric Vervisch	P	5
(Austria) GRT Grasser Racing Team	Lamborghini Huracán GT3	19	(Netherlands) Renger van der Zande	P	5
(Austria) GRT Grasser Racing Team	Lamborghini Huracán GT3	63	(Italy) Mirko Bortolotti	P	All
(Austria) GRT Grasser Racing Team	Lamborghini Huracán GT3	63	(Italy) Andrea Caldarelli	P	All
(Austria) GRT Grasser Racing Team	Lamborghini Huracán GT3	63	(Germany) Christian Engelhart	P	All
(Austria) GRT Grasser Racing Team	Lamborghini Huracán GT3	82	(France) Tom Dillmann	P	5
(Austria) GRT Grasser Racing Team	Lamborghini Huracán GT3	82	(Italy) Giorgio Roda	P	5
(Austria) GRT Grasser Racing Team	Lamborghini Huracán GT3	82	(Italy) Paolo Ruberti	P	5
(United Kingdom) / Motul Team RJN Motorsport (Note: Car No. 22 entered as Motul Team RJN Motorsport and car No. 23 entered as Motul Team RJN Nissan.); (United Kingdom) / Motul Team RJN Nissan	Nissan GT-R Nismo GT3	22	(United Kingdom) Struan Moore	P	All
(United Kingdom) / Motul Team RJN Motorsport; (United Kingdom) / Motul Team RJN Nissan	Nissan GT-R Nismo GT3	22	(United Kingdom) Matt Parry	P	All
(United Kingdom) / Motul Team RJN Motorsport; (United Kingdom) / Motul Team RJN Nissan	Nissan GT-R Nismo GT3	22	(Australia) Matt Simmons	P	All
(United Kingdom) / Motul Team RJN Motorsport; (United Kingdom) / Motul Team RJN Nissan	Nissan GT-R Nismo GT3	23	(United Kingdom) Alex Buncombe	P	All
(United Kingdom) / Motul Team RJN Motorsport; (United Kingdom) / Motul Team RJN Nissan	Nissan GT-R Nismo GT3	23	(Japan) Katsumasa Chiyo	P	All
(United Kingdom) / Motul Team RJN Motorsport; (United Kingdom) / Motul Team RJN Nissan	Nissan GT-R Nismo GT3	23	(Spain) Lucas Ordóñez	P	All
(Germany) Reiter Young Stars	Lamborghini Gallardo R-EX	24	(Czech Republic) Tomáš Enge	P	3, 5
(Germany) Reiter Young Stars	Lamborghini Gallardo R-EX	24	(Finland) Marko Helistekangas	P	3, 5
(Germany) Reiter Young Stars	Lamborghini Gallardo R-EX	24	(Australia) Caitlin Wood	P	3, 5
(France) / Audi Sport Team Saintéloc (Note: Car No. 25 entered as Audi Sport Team Saintéloc and its drivers scored points for Saintéloc Racing at Round 3 and for Audi Sport Team Saintéloc at Round 4. Car No. 26 entered as Saintéloc Racing.); (France) / Saintéloc Racing	Audi R8 LMS	25	(Germany) Christopher Haase	P	3–4
(France) / Audi Sport Team Saintéloc; (France) / Saintéloc Racing	Audi R8 LMS	25	(Germany) Markus Winkelhock	P	3–4
(France) / Audi Sport Team Saintéloc; (France) / Saintéloc Racing	Audi R8 LMS	25	(Germany) Peter Terting	P	3
(France) / Audi Sport Team Saintéloc; (France) / Saintéloc Racing	Audi R8 LMS	25	(France) Jules Gounon	P	4
(France) / Audi Sport Team Saintéloc; (France) / Saintéloc Racing	Audi R8 LMS	26	(Belgium) Christian Kelders	PA	1–3
(France) / Audi Sport Team Saintéloc; (France) / Saintéloc Racing	Audi R8 LMS	26	(France) Marc Rostan	PA	1–3
(France) / Audi Sport Team Saintéloc; (France) / Saintéloc Racing	Audi R8 LMS	26	(Germany) Christopher Haase	PA	1–2
(France) / Audi Sport Team Saintéloc; (France) / Saintéloc Racing	Audi R8 LMS	26	(France) Grégory Guilvert	PA	3
(France) / Audi Sport Team Saintéloc; (France) / Saintéloc Racing	Audi R8 LMS	26	(Belgium) Frédéric Bouvy	Am	4
(France) / Audi Sport Team Saintéloc; (France) / Saintéloc Racing	Audi R8 LMS	26	(Belgium) Christian Kelders	Am	4
(France) / Audi Sport Team Saintéloc; (France) / Saintéloc Racing	Audi R8 LMS	26	(France) Marc Rostan	Am	4
(France) / Audi Sport Team Saintéloc; (France) / Saintéloc Racing	Audi R8 LMS	26	(France) Simon Gachet	P	5
(France) / Audi Sport Team Saintéloc; (France) / Saintéloc Racing	Audi R8 LMS	26	(Germany) Christopher Haase	P	5
(France) / Audi Sport Team Saintéloc; (France) / Saintéloc Racing	Audi R8 LMS	26	(France) Romain Monti	P	5
(Italy) Orange 1 Team Lazarus	Lamborghini Huracán GT3	27	(Italy) Fabrizio Crestani	P	All
(Italy) Orange 1 Team Lazarus	Lamborghini Huracán GT3	27	(Germany) Nicolas Pohler	P	All
(Italy) Orange 1 Team Lazarus	Lamborghini Huracán GT3	27	(Colombia) Gustavo Yacamán	P	1–2
(Italy) Orange 1 Team Lazarus	Lamborghini Huracán GT3	27	(Italy) Luca Filippi	P	3–4
(Italy) Orange 1 Team Lazarus	Lamborghini Huracán GT3	27	(Poland) Artur Janosz	P	5
(Germany) Team Zakspeed	Mercedes-AMG GT3	31	(Portugal) Rui Águas	PA	1–2
(Germany) Team Zakspeed	Mercedes-AMG GT3	31	(Argentina) José Manuel Balbiani	PA	1–2
(Germany) Team Zakspeed	Mercedes-AMG GT3	31	(Greece) Kriton Lendoudis	PA	1–2
(Germany) Team Zakspeed	Mercedes-AMG GT3	32	(Italy) Kevin Ceccon	P	1
(Germany) Team Zakspeed	Mercedes-AMG GT3	32	(Germany) Luca Ludwig	P	1
(Germany) Team Zakspeed	Mercedes-AMG GT3	32	(Germany) Immanuel Vinke	P	1
(Germany) Team Zakspeed	Mercedes-AMG GT3	32	(Germany) Immanuel Vinke	Am	2
(Germany) Team Zakspeed	Mercedes-AMG GT3	32	(Italy) Beniamino Caccia	Am	2
(Germany) Team Zakspeed	Mercedes-AMG GT3	32	(Germany) Jörg Viebahn	Am	2
(Germany) Walkenhorst Motorsport	BMW M6 GT3	35	(Denmark) Mikkel Jensen	P	1–3, 5
(Germany) Walkenhorst Motorsport	BMW M6 GT3	35	(Germany) Nico Menzel	P	1–3, 5
(Germany) Walkenhorst Motorsport	BMW M6 GT3	35	(Netherlands) Jaap van Lagen	P	1
(Germany) Walkenhorst Motorsport	BMW M6 GT3	35	(Norway) Christian Krognes	P	2–3, 5
(Germany) Walkenhorst Motorsport	BMW M6 GT3	35	(Finland) Matias Henkola	PA	4
(Germany) Walkenhorst Motorsport	BMW M6 GT3	35	(Norway) Christian Krognes	PA	4
(Germany) Walkenhorst Motorsport	BMW M6 GT3	35	(Germany) Nico Menzel	PA	4
(Germany) Walkenhorst Motorsport	BMW M6 GT3	35	(Finland) Markus Palttala	PA	4
(Germany) Walkenhorst Motorsport	BMW M6 GT3	36	(Germany) Henry Walkenhorst	Am	2–5
(Germany) Walkenhorst Motorsport	BMW M6 GT3	36	(Germany) David Schiwietz	Am	2–4
(Germany) Walkenhorst Motorsport	BMW M6 GT3	36	(Finland) Matias Henkola	Am	2, 5
(Germany) Walkenhorst Motorsport	BMW M6 GT3	36	(Belgium) Stef Van Campenhout	Am	3–4
(Germany) Walkenhorst Motorsport	BMW M6 GT3	36	(Germany) Ralf Oeverhaus	Am	4
(Germany) Walkenhorst Motorsport	BMW M6 GT3	36	(United States) Ace Robey	Am	5
(China) BBT (Note: Car No. 37 entered as BBT under Chinese licence and its drivers scored points for BBT instead of AF Corse. Car No. 50 entered as Spirit of Race under Swiss licence, but its drivers scored points for AF Corse. Cars No. 51, 52 and the Am entry of 961 entered as AF Corse and car No. 55 entered as Kaspersky Motorsport, both under Italian licence. Cars No. 53 and the Pro-Am entry of 961 entered as Spirit of Race under Swiss licence and its drivers scored points for Spirit of Race instead of AF Corse. Car No. 72 entered as SMP Racing under Russian licence and its drivers scored points for SMP Racing instead of AF Corse.) (Switzerland) Spirit of Race (Italy) AF Corse (Italy) Kaspersky Motorsport (Russia) SMP Racing	Ferrari 488 GT3	37	(China) Anthony Liu	PA	3
(China) BBT (Switzerland) Spirit of Race (Italy) AF Corse (Italy) Kaspersky Motorsport (Russia) SMP Racing	Ferrari 488 GT3	37	(Italy) Davide Rizzo	PA	3
(China) BBT (Switzerland) Spirit of Race (Italy) AF Corse (Italy) Kaspersky Motorsport (Russia) SMP Racing	Ferrari 488 GT3	37	(Finland) Toni Vilander	PA	3
(China) BBT (Switzerland) Spirit of Race (Italy) AF Corse (Italy) Kaspersky Motorsport (Russia) SMP Racing	Ferrari 488 GT3	50	(Thailand) Pasin Lathouras	P	All
(China) BBT (Switzerland) Spirit of Race (Italy) AF Corse (Italy) Kaspersky Motorsport (Russia) SMP Racing	Ferrari 488 GT3	50	(Italy) Alessandro Pier Guidi	P	All
(China) BBT (Switzerland) Spirit of Race (Italy) AF Corse (Italy) Kaspersky Motorsport (Russia) SMP Racing	Ferrari 488 GT3	50	(Italy) Michele Rugolo	P	All
(China) BBT (Switzerland) Spirit of Race (Italy) AF Corse (Italy) Kaspersky Motorsport (Russia) SMP Racing	Ferrari 488 GT3	51	(Monaco) Olivier Beretta	PA	All
(China) BBT (Switzerland) Spirit of Race (Italy) AF Corse (Italy) Kaspersky Motorsport (Russia) SMP Racing	Ferrari 488 GT3	51	(Italy) Lorenzo Bontempelli	PA	All
(China) BBT (Switzerland) Spirit of Race (Italy) AF Corse (Italy) Kaspersky Motorsport (Russia) SMP Racing	Ferrari 488 GT3	51	(Japan) Motoaki Ishikawa	PA	All
(China) BBT (Switzerland) Spirit of Race (Italy) AF Corse (Italy) Kaspersky Motorsport (Russia) SMP Racing	Ferrari 488 GT3	51	(Monaco) Francesco Castellacci	PA	4
(China) BBT (Switzerland) Spirit of Race (Italy) AF Corse (Italy) Kaspersky Motorsport (Russia) SMP Racing	Ferrari 488 GT3	52	(United Kingdom) Duncan Cameron	PA	4
(China) BBT (Switzerland) Spirit of Race (Italy) AF Corse (Italy) Kaspersky Motorsport (Russia) SMP Racing	Ferrari 488 GT3	52	(Republic of Ireland) Matt Griffin	PA	4
(China) BBT (Switzerland) Spirit of Race (Italy) AF Corse (Italy) Kaspersky Motorsport (Russia) SMP Racing	Ferrari 488 GT3	52	(Italy) Riccardo Ragazzi	PA	4
(China) BBT (Switzerland) Spirit of Race (Italy) AF Corse (Italy) Kaspersky Motorsport (Russia) SMP Racing	Ferrari 488 GT3	52	(United Kingdom) Aaron Scott	PA	4
(China) BBT (Switzerland) Spirit of Race (Italy) AF Corse (Italy) Kaspersky Motorsport (Russia) SMP Racing	Ferrari 488 GT3	53	(Netherlands) Niek Hommerson	PA	All
(China) BBT (Switzerland) Spirit of Race (Italy) AF Corse (Italy) Kaspersky Motorsport (Russia) SMP Racing	Ferrari 488 GT3	53	(Belgium) Louis Machiels	PA	All
(China) BBT (Switzerland) Spirit of Race (Italy) AF Corse (Italy) Kaspersky Motorsport (Russia) SMP Racing	Ferrari 488 GT3	53	(Italy) Andrea Bertolini	PA	1, 3–5
(China) BBT (Switzerland) Spirit of Race (Italy) AF Corse (Italy) Kaspersky Motorsport (Russia) SMP Racing	Ferrari 488 GT3	53	(United Kingdom) Rory Butcher	PA	2, 4
(China) BBT (Switzerland) Spirit of Race (Italy) AF Corse (Italy) Kaspersky Motorsport (Russia) SMP Racing	Ferrari 488 GT3	55	(United Kingdom) James Calado	P	All
(China) BBT (Switzerland) Spirit of Race (Italy) AF Corse (Italy) Kaspersky Motorsport (Russia) SMP Racing	Ferrari 488 GT3	55	(Italy) Marco Cioci	P	All
(China) BBT (Switzerland) Spirit of Race (Italy) AF Corse (Italy) Kaspersky Motorsport (Russia) SMP Racing	Ferrari 488 GT3	55	(Italy) Giancarlo Fisichella	P	All
(China) BBT (Switzerland) Spirit of Race (Italy) AF Corse (Italy) Kaspersky Motorsport (Russia) SMP Racing	Ferrari 488 GT3	72	(Spain) Miguel Molina	P	All
(China) BBT (Switzerland) Spirit of Race (Italy) AF Corse (Italy) Kaspersky Motorsport (Russia) SMP Racing	Ferrari 488 GT3	72	(Italy) Davide Rigon	P	All
(China) BBT (Switzerland) Spirit of Race (Italy) AF Corse (Italy) Kaspersky Motorsport (Russia) SMP Racing	Ferrari 488 GT3	72	(Russia) Viktor Shaytar	P	All
(China) BBT (Switzerland) Spirit of Race (Italy) AF Corse (Italy) Kaspersky Motorsport (Russia) SMP Racing	Ferrari 488 GT3	961	(Lebanon) Alex Demirdjian	Am	1
(China) BBT (Switzerland) Spirit of Race (Italy) AF Corse (Italy) Kaspersky Motorsport (Russia) SMP Racing	Ferrari 488 GT3	961	(United Kingdom) Abbie Eaton	Am	1
(China) BBT (Switzerland) Spirit of Race (Italy) AF Corse (Italy) Kaspersky Motorsport (Russia) SMP Racing	Ferrari 488 GT3	961	(Italy) Davide Rizzo	Am	1
(China) BBT (Switzerland) Spirit of Race (Italy) AF Corse (Italy) Kaspersky Motorsport (Russia) SMP Racing	Ferrari 488 GT3	961	(Lebanon) Alex Demirdjian	PA	4
(China) BBT (Switzerland) Spirit of Race (Italy) AF Corse (Italy) Kaspersky Motorsport (Russia) SMP Racing	Ferrari 488 GT3	961	(France) Nicolas Minassian	PA	4
(China) BBT (Switzerland) Spirit of Race (Italy) AF Corse (Italy) Kaspersky Motorsport (Russia) SMP Racing	Ferrari 488 GT3	961	(Italy) Davide Rizzo	PA	4
(China) BBT (Switzerland) Spirit of Race (Italy) AF Corse (Italy) Kaspersky Motorsport (Russia) SMP Racing	Ferrari 488 GT3	961	(Finland) Toni Vilander	PA	4
(United Kingdom) / Strakka Motorsport (Note: Car No. 42 entered as Strakka Racing at Round 1 and from Round 3 on, but as Strakka Motorsport at Round 2. Cars No. 43, 44, 58 and 59 entered as Strakka Racing.); (United Kingdom) / Strakka Racing	McLaren 650S GT3	42	(United Kingdom) Nick Leventis	PA	1, 3–5
(United Kingdom) / Strakka Motorsport; (United Kingdom) / Strakka Racing	McLaren 650S GT3	42	(United Kingdom) Lewis Williamson	PA	1, 3–5
(United Kingdom) / Strakka Motorsport; (United Kingdom) / Strakka Racing	McLaren 650S GT3	42	(United Kingdom) Craig Fleming	PA	1, 3–4
(United Kingdom) / Strakka Motorsport; (United Kingdom) / Strakka Racing	McLaren 650S GT3	42	(United Kingdom) Oliver Webb	PA	4
(United Kingdom) / Strakka Motorsport; (United Kingdom) / Strakka Racing	McLaren 650S GT3	42	(Italy) David Fumanelli	PA	5
(United Kingdom) / Strakka Motorsport; (United Kingdom) / Strakka Racing	McLaren 650S GT3	42	(Portugal) Álvaro Parente	P	2
(United Kingdom) / Strakka Motorsport; (United Kingdom) / Strakka Racing	McLaren 650S GT3	42	(United Kingdom) Oliver Webb	P	2
(United Kingdom) / Strakka Motorsport; (United Kingdom) / Strakka Racing	McLaren 650S GT3	42	(United Kingdom) Lewis Williamson	P	2
(United Kingdom) / Strakka Motorsport; (United Kingdom) / Strakka Racing	McLaren 650S GT3	43	(United Kingdom) Jonny Kane	P	3–5
(United Kingdom) / Strakka Motorsport; (United Kingdom) / Strakka Racing	McLaren 650S GT3	43	(United Kingdom) Sam Tordoff	P	3–5
(United Kingdom) / Strakka Motorsport; (United Kingdom) / Strakka Racing	McLaren 650S GT3	43	(Italy) David Fumanelli	P	3–4
(United Kingdom) / Strakka Motorsport; (United Kingdom) / Strakka Racing	McLaren 650S GT3	43	(United Kingdom) Ben Barnicoat	P	5
(United Kingdom) / Strakka Motorsport; (United Kingdom) / Strakka Racing	McLaren 650S GT3	44	(Italy) David Fumanelli	P	1–2
(United Kingdom) / Strakka Motorsport; (United Kingdom) / Strakka Racing	McLaren 650S GT3	44	(United Kingdom) Jonny Kane	P	1–2
(United Kingdom) / Strakka Motorsport; (United Kingdom) / Strakka Racing	McLaren 650S GT3	44	(United Kingdom) Sam Tordoff	P	1–2
(United Kingdom) / Strakka Motorsport; (United Kingdom) / Strakka Racing	McLaren 650S GT3	58	(United Kingdom) Ben Barnicoat	P	1–4
(United Kingdom) / Strakka Motorsport; (United Kingdom) / Strakka Racing	McLaren 650S GT3	58	(United Kingdom) Rob Bell	P	1–4
(United Kingdom) / Strakka Motorsport; (United Kingdom) / Strakka Racing	McLaren 650S GT3	58	(France) Côme Ledogar	P	1–4
(United Kingdom) / Strakka Motorsport; (United Kingdom) / Strakka Racing	McLaren 650S GT3	59	(Malaysia) Jazeman Jaafar	P	All
(United Kingdom) / Strakka Motorsport; (United Kingdom) / Strakka Racing	McLaren 650S GT3	59	(United Kingdom) Andrew Watson	P	All
(United Kingdom) / Strakka Motorsport; (United Kingdom) / Strakka Racing	McLaren 650S GT3	59	(United Kingdom) Dean Stoneman	P	1–3
(United Kingdom) / Strakka Motorsport; (United Kingdom) / Strakka Racing	McLaren 650S GT3	59	(Netherlands) Pieter Schothorst	P	4
(United Kingdom) / Strakka Motorsport; (United Kingdom) / Strakka Racing	McLaren 650S GT3	59	(Netherlands) Steijn Schothorst	P	5
(Germany) / MANN-FILTER Team HTP Motorsport (Note: Car No. 48 entered as MANN-FILTER Team HTP Motorsport, car No. 84 as Mercedes-AMG Team HTP Motorsport and cars No. 85 and 86 entered as HTP Motorsport.); (Germany) / Mercedes-AMG Team HTP Motorsport; (Germany) / HTP Motorsport	Mercedes-AMG GT3	48	(Germany) Patrick Assenheimer	P	All
(Germany) / MANN-FILTER Team HTP Motorsport; (Germany) / Mercedes-AMG Team HTP Motorsport; (Germany) / HTP Motorsport	Mercedes-AMG GT3	48	(Netherlands) Indy Dontje	P	All
(Germany) / MANN-FILTER Team HTP Motorsport; (Germany) / Mercedes-AMG Team HTP Motorsport; (Germany) / HTP Motorsport	Mercedes-AMG GT3	48	(Germany) Kenneth Heyer	P	All
(Germany) / MANN-FILTER Team HTP Motorsport; (Germany) / Mercedes-AMG Team HTP Motorsport; (Germany) / HTP Motorsport	Mercedes-AMG GT3	84	(Germany) Maximilian Buhk	P	All
(Germany) / MANN-FILTER Team HTP Motorsport; (Germany) / Mercedes-AMG Team HTP Motorsport; (Germany) / HTP Motorsport	Mercedes-AMG GT3	84	(Sweden) Jimmy Eriksson	P	All
(Germany) / MANN-FILTER Team HTP Motorsport; (Germany) / Mercedes-AMG Team HTP Motorsport; (Germany) / HTP Motorsport	Mercedes-AMG GT3	84	(France) Franck Perera	P	All
(Germany) / MANN-FILTER Team HTP Motorsport; (Germany) / Mercedes-AMG Team HTP Motorsport; (Germany) / HTP Motorsport	Mercedes-AMG GT3	85	(Austria) Dominik Baumann	P	All
(Germany) / MANN-FILTER Team HTP Motorsport; (Germany) / Mercedes-AMG Team HTP Motorsport; (Germany) / HTP Motorsport	Mercedes-AMG GT3	85	(Sweden) Edward Sandström	P	All
(Germany) / MANN-FILTER Team HTP Motorsport; (Germany) / Mercedes-AMG Team HTP Motorsport; (Germany) / HTP Motorsport	Mercedes-AMG GT3	85	(Germany) Fabian Schiller	P	All
(Germany) / MANN-FILTER Team HTP Motorsport; (Germany) / Mercedes-AMG Team HTP Motorsport; (Germany) / HTP Motorsport	Mercedes-AMG GT3	86	(Republic of Ireland) Damien Faulkner	PA	1–2
(Germany) / MANN-FILTER Team HTP Motorsport; (Germany) / Mercedes-AMG Team HTP Motorsport; (Germany) / HTP Motorsport	Mercedes-AMG GT3	86	(United States) Mike Skeen	PA	1–2
(Germany) / MANN-FILTER Team HTP Motorsport; (Germany) / Mercedes-AMG Team HTP Motorsport; (Germany) / HTP Motorsport	Mercedes-AMG GT3	86	(Italy) Gian Maria Gabbiani	PA	1
(Germany) / MANN-FILTER Team HTP Motorsport; (Germany) / Mercedes-AMG Team HTP Motorsport; (Germany) / HTP Motorsport	Mercedes-AMG GT3	86	(United Kingdom) Hunter Abbott	PA	2
(Italy) Raton Racing	Lamborghini Huracán GT3	60	(Italy) Andrea Amici	PA	1–3
(Italy) Raton Racing	Lamborghini Huracán GT3	60	(Italy) Stefano Costantini	PA	1–3
(Italy) Raton Racing	Lamborghini Huracán GT3	60	(Denmark) Dennis Lind	PA	1–3
(Germany) Attempto Racing	Lamborghini Huracán GT3	66	(Italy) Marco Mapelli	P	1–3
(Germany) Attempto Racing	Lamborghini Huracán GT3	66	(Italy) Giovanni Venturini	P	1–3
(Germany) Attempto Racing	Lamborghini Huracán GT3	66	(Italy) Luca Filippi	P	1
(Germany) Attempto Racing	Lamborghini Huracán GT3	66	(Belgium) Bertrand Baguette	P	2–3
(Germany) Attempto Racing	Lamborghini Huracán GT3	66	(Canada) Mikaël Grenier	P	4
(Germany) Attempto Racing	Lamborghini Huracán GT3	66	(Netherlands) Jaap van Lagen	P	4
(Germany) Attempto Racing	Lamborghini Huracán GT3	66	(Netherlands) Max van Splunteren	P	4
(Germany) Attempto Racing	Lamborghini Huracán GT3	66	(Andorra) Manel Cerqueda Diez	PA	5
(Germany) Attempto Racing	Lamborghini Huracán GT3	66	(Netherlands) Max van Splunteren	PA	5
(Germany) Attempto Racing	Lamborghini Huracán GT3	66	(Spain) Isaac Tutumlu	PA	5
(Germany) Attempto Racing	Lamborghini Huracán GT3	67	(Switzerland) Giorgio Maggi	PA	1–3
(Germany) Attempto Racing	Lamborghini Huracán GT3	67	(France) Clément Mateu	PA	1–3
(Germany) Attempto Racing	Lamborghini Huracán GT3	67	(Netherlands) Max van Splunteren	PA	1–3
(Germany) Attempto Racing	Lamborghini Huracán GT3	67	(Belgium) Sarah Bovy	Am	4
(Germany) Attempto Racing	Lamborghini Huracán GT3	67	(Germany) Jürgen Krebs	Am	4
(Germany) Attempto Racing	Lamborghini Huracán GT3	67	(Switzerland) Giorgio Maggi	Am	4
(Germany) Attempto Racing	Lamborghini Huracán GT3	67	(France) Clément Mateu	Am	4
(Czech Republic) / ISR (Note: Car No. 75 entered as ISR. Car No. 76 entered as Audi Sport Team ISR and its drivers scored points for ISR at Round 3 and for Audi Sport Team ISR at Round 4.); (Czech Republic) / Audi Sport Team ISR	Audi R8 LMS	75	(Czech Republic) Filip Salaquarda	P	All
(Czech Republic) / ISR; (Czech Republic) / Audi Sport Team ISR	Audi R8 LMS	75	(Austria) Clemens Schmid	P	1–4
(Czech Republic) / ISR; (Czech Republic) / Audi Sport Team ISR	Audi R8 LMS	75	(Germany) Frank Stippler	P	1–2, 5
(Czech Republic) / ISR; (Czech Republic) / Audi Sport Team ISR	Audi R8 LMS	75	(Portugal) Filipe Albuquerque	P	3–4
(Czech Republic) / ISR; (Czech Republic) / Audi Sport Team ISR	Audi R8 LMS	75	(Italy) Kevin Ceccon	P	5
(Czech Republic) / ISR; (Czech Republic) / Audi Sport Team ISR	Audi R8 LMS	76	(South Africa) Kelvin van der Linde	P	3–4
(Czech Republic) / ISR; (Czech Republic) / Audi Sport Team ISR	Audi R8 LMS	76	(Germany) Frank Stippler	P	3–4
(Czech Republic) / ISR; (Czech Republic) / Audi Sport Team ISR	Audi R8 LMS	76	(United Kingdom) Jamie Green	P	3
(Czech Republic) / ISR; (Czech Republic) / Audi Sport Team ISR	Audi R8 LMS	76	(Germany) Pierre Kaffer	P	4
(United Kingdom) Barwell Motorsport	Lamborghini Huracán GT3	77	(Croatia) Martin Kodrić	PA	All
(United Kingdom) Barwell Motorsport	Lamborghini Huracán GT3	77	(Finland) Patrick Kujala	PA	All
(United Kingdom) Barwell Motorsport	Lamborghini Huracán GT3	77	(Switzerland) Adrian Amstutz	PA	1–4
(United Kingdom) Barwell Motorsport	Lamborghini Huracán GT3	77	(United Kingdom) Oliver Gavin	PA	4
(United Kingdom) Barwell Motorsport	Lamborghini Huracán GT3	77	(United Kingdom) Hunter Abbott	PA	5
(United Kingdom) Barwell Motorsport	Lamborghini Huracán GT3	78	(United Kingdom) Richard Abra	PA	All
(United Kingdom) Barwell Motorsport	Lamborghini Huracán GT3	78	(Russia) Leo Machitski	PA	All
(United Kingdom) Barwell Motorsport	Lamborghini Huracán GT3	78	(Portugal) Miguel Ramos	PA	1–4
(United Kingdom) Barwell Motorsport	Lamborghini Huracán GT3	78	(United Kingdom) Phil Keen	PA	4
(United Kingdom) Barwell Motorsport	Lamborghini Huracán GT3	78	(Netherlands) Jeroen Bleekemolen	PA	5
(France) / AKKA ASP (Note: Cars No. 87, 89 and 90 entered as AKKA ASP. Car No. 88 entered as AKKA ASP at Rounds 1 to 3 and 5, but entered as Mercedes-AMG Team AKKA ASP at Round 4.); (France) / Mercedes-AMG Team AKKA ASP	Mercedes-AMG GT3	87	(France) Jean-Luc Beaubelique	PA	1–3, 5
(France) / AKKA ASP; (France) / Mercedes-AMG Team AKKA ASP	Mercedes-AMG GT3	87	(France) Jules Gounon	PA	1–3, 5
(France) / AKKA ASP; (France) / Mercedes-AMG Team AKKA ASP	Mercedes-AMG GT3	87	(Germany) Nico Bastian	PA	1–3
(France) / AKKA ASP; (France) / Mercedes-AMG Team AKKA ASP	Mercedes-AMG GT3	87	(Italy) Mauro Ricci	PA	5
(France) / AKKA ASP; (France) / Mercedes-AMG Team AKKA ASP	Mercedes-AMG GT3	88	(Spain) Daniel Juncadella	P	All
(France) / AKKA ASP; (France) / Mercedes-AMG Team AKKA ASP	Mercedes-AMG GT3	88	(Puerto Rico) Félix Serrallés	P	All
(France) / AKKA ASP; (France) / Mercedes-AMG Team AKKA ASP	Mercedes-AMG GT3	88	(France) Tristan Vautier	P	1–2, 4–5
(France) / AKKA ASP; (France) / Mercedes-AMG Team AKKA ASP	Mercedes-AMG GT3	88	(Netherlands) Renger van der Zande	P	3
(France) / AKKA ASP; (France) / Mercedes-AMG Team AKKA ASP	Mercedes-AMG GT3	89	(France) Ludovic Badey	PA	All
(France) / AKKA ASP; (France) / Mercedes-AMG Team AKKA ASP	Mercedes-AMG GT3	89	(Switzerland) Daniele Perfetti	PA	All
(France) / AKKA ASP; (France) / Mercedes-AMG Team AKKA ASP	Mercedes-AMG GT3	89	(Switzerland) Alex Fontana	PA	1–4
(France) / AKKA ASP; (France) / Mercedes-AMG Team AKKA ASP	Mercedes-AMG GT3	89	(Germany) Nico Bastian	PA	4–5
(France) / AKKA ASP; (France) / Mercedes-AMG Team AKKA ASP	Mercedes-AMG GT3	90	(Italy) Raffaele Marciello	P	All
(France) / AKKA ASP; (France) / Mercedes-AMG Team AKKA ASP	Mercedes-AMG GT3	90	(United Kingdom) Michael Meadows	P	All
(France) / AKKA ASP; (France) / Mercedes-AMG Team AKKA ASP	Mercedes-AMG GT3	90	(Italy) Edoardo Mortara	P	All
Oman Racing Team with TF Sport	Aston Martin V12 Vantage GT3	97	(United Kingdom) Jonathan Adam	PA	All
Oman Racing Team with TF Sport	Aston Martin V12 Vantage GT3	97	(Oman) Ahmad Al Harthy	PA	All
Oman Racing Team with TF Sport	Aston Martin V12 Vantage GT3	97	(Turkey) Salih Yoluç	PA	3–5
Oman Racing Team with TF Sport	Aston Martin V12 Vantage GT3	97	(United Kingdom) Euan Hankey	PA	4
(Germany) Rowe Racing	BMW M6 GT3	98	(Canada) Bruno Spengler	P	2–5
(Germany) Rowe Racing	BMW M6 GT3	98	(Finland) Markus Palttala	P	2–3, 5
(Germany) Rowe Racing	BMW M6 GT3	98	(Finland) Jesse Krohn	P	2
(Germany) Rowe Racing	BMW M6 GT3	98	(United Kingdom) Tom Blomqvist	P	3–5
(Germany) Rowe Racing	BMW M6 GT3	98	(Netherlands) Nick Catsburg	P	4
(Germany) Rowe Racing	BMW M6 GT3	99	(Austria) Philipp Eng	P	2–5
(Germany) Rowe Racing	BMW M6 GT3	99	(Belgium) Maxime Martin	P	2–5
(Germany) Rowe Racing	BMW M6 GT3	99	(United Kingdom) Alexander Sims	P	2–5
(Germany) KÜS TEAM75 Bernhard	Porsche 911 GT3 R	117	(Denmark) Michael Christensen	P	4
(Germany) KÜS TEAM75 Bernhard	Porsche 911 GT3 R	117	(France) Kévin Estre	P	4
(Germany) KÜS TEAM75 Bernhard	Porsche 911 GT3 R	117	(Belgium) Laurens Vanthoor	P	4
(United Kingdom) Garage 59	McLaren 650S GT3	188	(United Kingdom) Chris Goodwin	Am	2, 4
(United Kingdom) Garage 59	McLaren 650S GT3	188	(United Kingdom) Chris Harris	Am	2, 4
(United Kingdom) Garage 59	McLaren 650S GT3	188	(Sweden) Alexander West	Am	2, 4
(United Kingdom) Garage 59	McLaren 650S GT3	188	(United Kingdom) Bradley Ellis	Am	4
(Germany) Rinaldi Racing	Ferrari 488 GT3	333	(Germany) Alexander Mattschull	PA	All
(Germany) Rinaldi Racing	Ferrari 488 GT3	333	(Russia) Rinat Salikhov	PA	All
(Germany) Rinaldi Racing	Ferrari 488 GT3	333	(Germany) Daniel Keilwitz	PA	1–2, 5
(Germany) Rinaldi Racing	Ferrari 488 GT3	333	(Italy) Matteo Malucelli	PA	3–4
(Germany) Rinaldi Racing	Ferrari 488 GT3	333	(Austria) Norbert Siedler	PA	4
(Germany) Rinaldi Racing	Ferrari 488 GT3	488	(Germany) Pierre Ehret	Am	All
(Germany) Rinaldi Racing	Ferrari 488 GT3	488	(Italy) Rino Mastronardi	Am	All
(Germany) Rinaldi Racing	Ferrari 488 GT3	488	(Finland) Rory Penttinen	Am	3
(Germany) Rinaldi Racing	Ferrari 488 GT3	488	(Belgium) Patrick Van Glabeke	Am	4
(Germany) Rinaldi Racing	Ferrari 488 GT3	488	(Italy) Gabriele Lancieri	Am	4
(Austria) Team HB Racing	Lamborghini Huracán GT3	777	(Belgium) Bernard Delhez	Am	All
(Austria) Team HB Racing	Lamborghini Huracán GT3	777	(France) Gilles Vannelet	Am	1–4
(Austria) Team HB Racing	Lamborghini Huracán GT3	777	(Germany) Mike Stursberg	Am	2–4
(Austria) Team HB Racing	Lamborghini Huracán GT3	777	(Switzerland) Christopher Zanella	Am	4
(Austria) Team HB Racing	Lamborghini Huracán GT3	777	(Germany) Edward Lewis Brauner	Am	5
(Austria) Team HB Racing	Lamborghini Huracán GT3	777	(France) Marc Rostan	Am	5
(Germany) Herberth Motorsport	Porsche 911 GT3 R	911	(Germany) Jürgen Häring	PA	All
(Germany) Herberth Motorsport	Porsche 911 GT3 R	911	(Germany) Alfred Renauer	PA	All
(Germany) Herberth Motorsport	Porsche 911 GT3 R	911	(Germany) Robert Renauer	PA	All
(Germany) Herberth Motorsport	Porsche 911 GT3 R	911	(Germany) Marc Lieb	PA	4
(Germany) Herberth Motorsport	Porsche 911 GT3 R	912	(Switzerland) Daniel Allemann	PA	4
(Germany) Herberth Motorsport	Porsche 911 GT3 R	912	(Germany) Ralf Bohn	PA	4
(Germany) Herberth Motorsport	Porsche 911 GT3 R	912	(France) Mathieu Jaminet	PA	4
(Germany) Herberth Motorsport	Porsche 911 GT3 R	912	(Germany) Sven Müller	PA	4
Group N entries are ineligible to score points
(France) RMS	Porsche 911 GT3 Cup	56	(United States) Howard Blank	N	4
(France) RMS	Porsche 911 GT3 Cup	56	(France) Yannick Mallegol	N	4
(France) RMS	Porsche 911 GT3 Cup	56	(United States) Frank Mechaly	N	4
(France) RMS	Porsche 911 GT3 Cup	56	(Monaco) Fabrice Notari	N	4
(Belgium) SpeedLover	Porsche 911 GT3 Cup	991	(Belgium) Thierry de Latre du Bosqueau	N	4
(Belgium) SpeedLover	Porsche 911 GT3 Cup	991	(Belgium) Grégory Paisse	N	4
(Belgium) SpeedLover	Porsche 911 GT3 Cup	991	(Belgium) Pierre-Yves Paque	N	4
(Belgium) SpeedLover	Porsche 911 GT3 Cup	991	(Belgium) Louis-Philippe Soenen	N	4

Icon	Class
P	Pro Cup
PA	Pro-Am Cup
Am	Am Cup
N	Group N

== Race results ==
Bold indicates overall winner.

Event	Circuit	Pole position	Pro Winners	Pro-Am Winners	Am Winners
1	(Italy) Monza	(Switzerland) No. 50 Spirit of Race	(Austria) **No. 63 GRT Grasser Racing Team**	No. 97 Oman Racing Team with TF Sport	(Italy) No. 961 AF Corse
1	(Italy) Monza	(Thailand) Pasin Lathouras (Italy) Alessandro Pier Guidi (Italy) Michele Rugolo	(Italy) **Mirko Bortolotti** **(Italy) Andrea Caldarelli** **(Germany) Christian Engelhart**	(United Kingdom) Jonathan Adam (Oman) Ahmad Al Harthy	(Lebanon) Alex Demirdjian (United Kingdom) Abbie Eaton (Italy) Davide Rizzo
2	(United Kingdom) Silverstone	(France) No. 88 AKKA ASP	(Austria) **No. 63 GRT Grasser Racing Team**	(United Kingdom) No. 77 Barwell Motorsport	(Germany) No. 488 Rinaldi Racing
2	(United Kingdom) Silverstone	(Spain) Daniel Juncadella (Puerto Rico) Félix Serrallés (France) Tristan Vautier	(Italy) **Mirko Bortolotti** **(Italy) Andrea Caldarelli** **(Germany) Christian Engelhart**	(Switzerland) Adrian Amstutz (Croatia) Martin Kodrić (Finland) Patrick Kujala	(Germany) Pierre Ehret (Italy) Rino Mastronardi
3	(France) Paul Ricard	(Germany) No. 4 Mercedes-AMG Team Black Falcon	**(United Kingdom) No. 8 Bentley Team M-Sport**	(United Kingdom) No. 77 Barwell Motorsport	(Switzerland) No. 888 Kessel Racing
3	(France) Paul Ricard	(Netherlands) Yelmer Buurman (United Kingdom) Adam Christodoulou (Germany) Luca Stolz	**(Monaco) Vincent Abril** **(Spain) Andy Soucek** **(Belgium) Maxime Soulet**	(Switzerland) Adrian Amstutz (Croatia) Martin Kodrić (Finland) Patrick Kujala	(Belgium) Jacques Duyver (South Africa) David Perel (Italy) Marco Zanuttini
4	(Belgium) Spa-Francorchamps	(Italy) No. 55 Kaspersky Motorsport	**(France) No. 25 Audi Sport Team Saintéloc**	(Germany) No. 16 Black Falcon	(Switzerland) No. 888 Kessel Racing
4	(Belgium) Spa-Francorchamps	(United Kingdom) James Calado (Italy) Marco Cioci (Italy) Giancarlo Fisichella	**(France) Jules Gounon** **(Germany) Christopher Haase** **(Germany) Markus Winkelhock**	(Germany) Maximilian Götz (Germany) Marvin Kirchhöfer (United Kingdom) Oliver Morley (Spain) Miguel Toril	(Italy) Niki Cadei (Belgium) Jacques Duyver (South Africa) David Perel (Italy) Marco Zanuttini
5	(Spain) Barcelona-Catalunya	(Belgium) No. 17 Team WRT	**(France) No. 88 AKKA ASP**	(United Kingdom) No. 77 Barwell Motorsport	(Germany) No. 488 Rinaldi Racing
5	(Spain) Barcelona-Catalunya	(United Kingdom) Jake Dennis (Netherlands) Robin Frijns (United Kingdom) Stuart Leonard	**(Spain) Daniel Juncadella** **(Puerto Rico) Félix Serrallés** **(France) Tristan Vautier**	(United Kingdom) Hunter Abbott (Croatia) Martin Kodrić (Finland) Patrick Kujala	(Germany) Pierre Ehret (Italy) Rino Mastronardi

== Championship standings ==
Scoring system

Championship points were awarded for the first ten positions in each race. The pole-sitter also received one point and entries were required to complete 75% of the winning car's race distance in order to be classified and earn points. Individual drivers were required to participate for a minimum of 25 minutes in order to earn championship points in any race.

Race points

Position	**1st**	**2nd**	**3rd**	**4th**	**5th**	**6th**	**7th**	**8th**	**9th**	**10th**	**Pole**
Points	25	18	15	12	10	8	6	4	2	1	1

1000 km Paul Ricard points

Position	**1st**	**2nd**	**3rd**	**4th**	**5th**	**6th**	**7th**	**8th**	**9th**	**10th**	**Pole**
Points	33	24	19	15	12	9	6	4	2	1	1

24 Hours of Spa points

Points were awarded after six hours, after twelve hours and at the finish.

Position	**1st**	**2nd**	**3rd**	**4th**	**5th**	**6th**	**7th**	**8th**	**9th**	**10th**	**Pole**
Points after 6hrs/12hrs	12	9	7	6	5	4	3	2	1	0	1
Points at the finish	25	18	15	12	10	8	6	4	2	1	1

=== Drivers' championships ===
==== Overall ====
Pos.	Driver	Team	MNZ (Italy)	SIL (United Kingdom)	LEC (France)	SPA (Belgium)			CAT (Spain)	Points
Pos.	Driver	Team	MNZ (Italy)	SIL (United Kingdom)	LEC (France)	6hrs	12hrs	24hrs	CAT (Spain)	Points
1	(Italy) Mirko Bortolotti (Italy) Andrea Caldarelli (Germany) Christian Engelhart	(Austria) GRT Grasser Racing Team	1	1	13	2	1	Ret	3	86
2	(Monaco) Vincent Abril (Spain) Andy Soucek (Belgium) Maxime Soulet	(United Kingdom) Bentley Team M-Sport	6	5	1	5	5	2	Ret	79
3	(Germany) Maximilian Buhk (Sweden) Jimmy Eriksson (France) Franck Perera	(Germany) Mercedes-AMG Team HTP Motorsport	3	2	40	3	52	Ret	4	52
4	(Spain) Miguel Molina (Italy) Davide Rigon (Russia) Viktor Shaytar	(Russia) SMP Racing	5	4	2	51	36	24	Ret	46
5	(Italy) Raffaele Marciello (United Kingdom) Michael Meadows (Italy) Edoardo Mortara	(France) AKKA ASP	Ret	3	10	11	4	3	7	43
6	(Spain) Daniel Juncadella (Puerto Rico) Félix Serrallés	(France) AKKA ASP	30	**11**	4				1	41
6	(Spain) Daniel Juncadella (Puerto Rico) Félix Serrallés	(France) Mercedes-AMG Team AKKA ASP				10	46	Ret		41
7	(United Kingdom) James Calado (Italy) Marco Cioci (Italy) Giancarlo Fisichella	(Italy) Kaspersky Motorsport	4	23	Ret	**1**	3	Ret	18	32
8	(Germany) Markus Winkelhock	(Belgium) Team WRT	12							30
8	(Germany) Markus Winkelhock	(France) Audi Sport Team Saintéloc			9	7	13	1		30
9	(Germany) Christopher Haase	(France) Saintéloc Racing	Ret	36					17	30
9	(Germany) Christopher Haase	(France) Audi Sport Team Saintéloc			9	7	13	1		30
10	(Spain) Antonio García (Switzerland) Nico Müller (Germany) René Rast	(Belgium) Audi Sport Team WRT			3	12	8	6		29
11	(France) Jules Gounon	(France) AKKA ASP	17	22	15				36	28
11	(France) Jules Gounon	(France) Audi Sport Team Saintéloc				7	13	1		28
12	(United Kingdom) Jake Dennis (United Kingdom) Stuart Leonard	(Belgium) Team WRT	12	13	6	62	62	Ret	**2**	28
13	(Netherlands) Robin Frijns	(Belgium) Team WRT			6				**2**	28
14	(Thailand) Pasin Lathouras (Italy) Alessandro Pier Guidi (Italy) Michele Rugolo	(Switzerland) Spirit of Race	**2**	6	23	63	63	Ret	15	27
15	(Austria) Dominik Baumann (Sweden) Edward Sandström (Germany) Fabian Schiller	(Germany) HTP Motorsport	Ret	37	Ret	6	2	7	6	27
16	(France) Tristan Vautier	(France) AKKA ASP	30	**11**					1	26
16	(France) Tristan Vautier	(France) Mercedes-AMG Team AKKA ASP				10	46	Ret		26
17	(Belgium) Frédéric Vervisch	(Belgium) Audi Sport Team WRT			8	4	10	5		20
17	(Belgium) Frédéric Vervisch	(Austria) GRT Grasser Racing Team							31	20
18	(Germany) Christopher Mies	(Belgium) Audi Sport Team WRT			8	4	10	5		20
19	(Netherlands) Yelmer Buurman (United Kingdom) Adam Christodoulou (Germany) Luca Stolz	(Germany) Mercedes-AMG Team Black Falcon	10	Ret	**33**				5	19
19	(Netherlands) Yelmer Buurman (United Kingdom) Adam Christodoulou (Germany) Luca Stolz	(Germany) Black Falcon				13	7	8		19
20	(United States) Connor De Phillippi	(Belgium) Audi Sport Team WRT				4	10	5		16
21	(Netherlands) Renger van der Zande	(France) AKKA ASP			4					15
21	(Netherlands) Renger van der Zande	(Germany) Black Falcon				19	45	Ret		15
21	(Netherlands) Renger van der Zande	(Austria) GRT Grasser Racing Team							31	15
22	(Denmark) Michael Christensen (France) Kévin Estre (Belgium) Laurens Vanthoor	(Germany) KÜS TEAM75 Bernhard				20	11	4		12
23	(United Kingdom) Alex Buncombe (Japan) Katsumasa Chiyo (Spain) Lucas Ordóñez	(United Kingdom) Motul Team RJN Nissan	Ret	16	5	17	16	13	13	12
24	(Czech Republic) Filip Salaquarda	(Czech Republic) ISR	29	Ret	7	59	59	Ret	8	10
25	(Germany) Frank Stippler	(Czech Republic) ISR	29	Ret					8	9
25	(Germany) Frank Stippler	(Czech Republic) Audi Sport Team ISR			29	8	9	9		9
26	(United Kingdom) Jonathan Adam (Oman) Ahmad Al Harthy	Oman Racing Team with TF Sport	7	21	14	9	14	15	26	7
27	(Austria) Philipp Eng (Belgium) Maxime Martin (United Kingdom) Alexander Sims	(Germany) Rowe Racing		7	Ret	44	27	33	12	6
28	(Austria) Clemens Schmid	(Czech Republic) ISR	29	Ret	7	59	59	Ret		6
29	(Portugal) Filipe Albuquerque	(Czech Republic) ISR			7	59	59	Ret		6
30	(Canada) Bruno Spengler	(Germany) Rowe Racing		41	Ret	15	6	10	Ret	5
31	(United Kingdom) Tom Blomqvist	(Germany) Rowe Racing			Ret	15	6	10	Ret	5
32	(Netherlands) Nick Catsburg	(Germany) Rowe Racing				15	6	10		5
33	(South Africa) Kelvin van der Linde	(Czech Republic) Audi Sport Team ISR			29	8	9	9		5
34	(Germany) Pierre Kaffer	(Czech Republic) Audi Sport Team ISR				8	9	9		5
35	(Poland) Michał Broniszewski	(Switzerland) Kessel Racing	8	44	32	22	17	Ret	28	4
36	(Italy) Matteo Cressoni (Italy) Andrea Rizzoli	(Switzerland) Kessel Racing	8	44	32	22	17	Ret		4
37	(United Kingdom) Lewis Williamson	(United Kingdom) Strakka Racing	Ret		38	28	48	Ret	22	4
37	(United Kingdom) Lewis Williamson	(United Kingdom) Strakka Motorsport		8						4
38	(United Kingdom) Oliver Webb	(United Kingdom) Strakka Motorsport		8						4
38	(United Kingdom) Oliver Webb	(United Kingdom) Strakka Racing				28	48	Ret		4
39	(Italy) Kevin Ceccon	(Germany) Team Zakspeed	32							4
39	(Italy) Kevin Ceccon	(Czech Republic) ISR							8	4
40	(Netherlands) Pieter Schothorst	(Belgium) Audi Sport Team WRT			8					4
40	(Netherlands) Pieter Schothorst	(United Kingdom) Strakka Racing				58	58	Ret		4
41	(Portugal) Álvaro Parente	(United Kingdom) Strakka Motorsport		8						4
42	(United Kingdom) Oliver Jarvis (United Kingdom) Steven Kane (United Kingdom) Guy Smith	(United Kingdom) Bentley Team M-Sport	DSQ	9	35	18	21	14	19	2
43	(United Kingdom) Ben Barnicoat	(United Kingdom) Strakka Racing	9	34	Ret	60	60	Ret	14	2
44	(United Kingdom) Rob Bell (France) Côme Ledogar	(United Kingdom) Strakka Racing	9	34	Ret	60	60	Ret		2
45	(France) Nathanaël Berthon (Monaco) Stéphane Richelmi (France) Benoît Tréluyer	(Belgium) Belgian Audi Club Team WRT	DNS	Ret	Ret				9	2
45	(France) Nathanaël Berthon (Monaco) Stéphane Richelmi (France) Benoît Tréluyer	(Belgium) Team WRT				55	57	Ret		2
46	(Germany) Peter Terting	(France) Audi Sport Team Saintéloc			9					2
47	(Turkey) Salih Yoluç	Oman Racing Team with TF Sport			14	9	14	15	26	1
48	(United Kingdom) Euan Hankey	Oman Racing Team with TF Sport				9	14	15		1
49	(Monaco) Stéphane Ortelli	(Switzerland) Emil FreyJaguar Racing	31	10	39	46	55	Ret	11	1
50	(Switzerland) Jonathan Hirschi (Austria) Christian Klien (Germany) Marco Seefried	(Switzerland) Emil Frey Jaguar Racing	Ret	12	34	61	61	Ret	10	1
51	(Spain) Albert Costa (Switzerland) Lorenz Frey	(Switzerland) Emil Frey Jaguar Racing	31	10	39	46	55	Ret		1
	(United Kingdom) Struan Moore (United Kingdom) Matt Parry (Australia) Matt Simmons	(United Kingdom) Motul Team RJN Motorsport	13	24	11	48	32	30	Ret	0
	(United Kingdom) Jonny Kane (United Kingdom) Sam Tordoff	(United Kingdom) Strakka Racing	11	Ret	16	38	44	Ret	14	0
	(Italy) David Fumanelli	(United Kingdom) Strakka Racing	11	Ret	16	38	44	Ret	22	0
	(Austria) Norbert Siedler	(Austria) GRT Grasser Racing Team	Ret	17	Ret					0
	(Austria) Norbert Siedler	(Germany) Rinaldi Racing				54	56	Ret		0
	(Austria) Norbert Siedler	(Switzerland) Emil Frey Jaguar Racing							11	0
	(Switzerland) Marcel Fässler (Belgium) Dries Vanthoor	(Belgium) Belgian Audi Club Team WRT	Ret	Ret	Ret				Ret	0
	(Switzerland) Marcel Fässler (Belgium) Dries Vanthoor	(Belgium) Audi Sport Team WRT				31	19	11		0
	(Germany) André Lotterer	(Belgium) Audi Sport Team WRT				31	19	11		0
	(Switzerland) Alex Fontana	(France) AKKA ASP	Ret	32	Ret	56	50	Ret		0
	(Switzerland) Alex Fontana	(Switzerland) Emil Frey Jaguar Racing							11	0
	(United Kingdom) Oliver Morley (Spain) Miguel Toril	(Germany) Black Falcon	19	Ret	20	14	12	12	30	0
	(Germany) Marvin Kirchhöfer	(Germany) Black Falcon				14	12	12	30	0
	(Germany) Maximilian Götz	(Germany) Black Falcon				14	12	12		0
	(Croatia) Martin Kodrić (Finland) Patrick Kujala	(United Kingdom) Barwell Motorsport	23	20	12	42	30	Ret	16	0
	(Switzerland) Adrian Amstutz	(United Kingdom) Barwell Motorsport	23	20	12	42	30	Ret		0
	(United Kingdom) Jamie Green	(Belgium) Team WRT		13		62	62	Ret		0
	(United Kingdom) Jamie Green	(Czech Republic) Audi Sport Team ISR			29					0
	(Germany) Patrick Assenheimer (Netherlands) Indy Dontje (Germany) Kenneth Heyer	(Germany) MANN-FILTER Team HTP Motorsport	14	Ret	18	47	51	Ret	40	0
	(Italy) Fabrizio Crestani (Germany) Nicolas Pohler	(Italy) Orange 1 Team Lazarus	21	14	21	30	20	21	25	0
	(Colombia) Gustavo Yacamán	(Italy) Orange 1 Team Lazarus	21	14						0
	(Italy) Michele Beretta (Italy) Stefano Gattuso (Italy) Andrea Piccini	(Italy) Ombra Racing	22	15	Ret	35	24	16	23	0
	(Germany) Nico Bastian	(France) AKKA ASP	17	22	15	56	50	Ret	21	0
	(France) Jean-Luc Beaubelique	(France) AKKA ASP	17	22	15				36	0
	(Netherlands) Niek Hommerson (Belgium) Louis Machiels	(Switzerland) Spirit of Race	15	33	17	23	38	Ret	Ret	0
	(Italy) Andrea Bertolini	(Switzerland) Spirit of Race	15		17	23	38	Ret	Ret	0
	(Italy) Davide Rizzo	(Italy) AF Corse	27							0
	(Italy) Davide Rizzo	(China) BBT			Ret					0
	(Italy) Davide Rizzo	(Switzerland) Spirit of Race				24	15	17		0
	(Lebanon) Alex Demirdjian	(Italy) AF Corse	27							0
	(Lebanon) Alex Demirdjian	(Switzerland) Spirit of Race				24	15	17		0
	(Finland) Toni Vilander	(China) BBT			Ret					0
	(Finland) Toni Vilander	(Switzerland) Spirit of Race				24	15	17		0
	(France) Nicolas Minassian	(Switzerland) Spirit of Race				24	15	17		0
	(Germany) Christer Jöns (South Africa) Jordan Pepper (Belgium) Nico Verdonck	(Germany) Bentley Team ABT				16	18	Ret		0
	(Germany) Alexander Mattschull (Russia) Rinat Salikhov	(Germany) Rinaldi Racing	16	EX	19	54	56	Ret	20	0
	(Germany) Daniel Keilwitz	(Germany) Rinaldi Racing	16	EX					20	0
	(United Kingdom) Hunter Abbott	(Germany) HTP Motorsport		25						0
	(United Kingdom) Hunter Abbott	(United Kingdom) Barwell Motorsport							16	0
	(Argentina) Ezequiel Pérez Companc	(Austria) GRT Grasser Racing Team	Ret	17	Ret	33	22	18	31	0
	(Italy) Raffaele Giammaria	(Austria) GRT Grasser Racing Team	Ret	17	Ret	33	22	18		0
	(Italy) Giacomo Piccini	(Switzerland) Kessel Racing				22	17	Ret	28	0
	(France) Simon Gachet (France) Romain Monti	(France) Saintéloc Racing							17	0
	(Germany) Nico Menzel	(Germany) Walkenhorst Motorsport	Ret	18	26	21	23	20	Ret	0
	(Norway) Christian Krognes	(Germany) Walkenhorst Motorsport		18	26	21	23	20	Ret	0
	(Switzerland) Rolf Ineichen	(Austria) GRT Grasser Racing Team				33	22	18		0
	(Republic of Ireland) Damien Faulkner (United States) Mike Skeen	(Germany) HTP Motorsport	18	25						0
	(Denmark) Mikkel Jensen	(Germany) Walkenhorst Motorsport	Ret	18	26				Ret	0
	(Italy) Gian Maria Gabbiani	(Germany) HTP Motorsport	18							0
	(Monaco) Olivier Beretta (Italy) Lorenzo Bontempelli (Japan) Motoaki Ishikawa	(Italy) AF Corse	Ret	38	Ret	34	25	19	24	0
	(Monaco) Francesco Castellacci	(Italy) AF Corse				34	25	19		0
	(Germany) Hubert Haupt (Italy) Gabriele Piana	(Germany) Black Falcon			Ret	19	45	Ret		0
	(Saudi Arabia) Abdulaziz Bin Turki Al Faisal	(Germany) Black Falcon				19	45	Ret		0
	(Italy) Matteo Malucelli	(Germany) Rinaldi Racing			19	54	56	Ret		0
	(Italy) Marco Mapelli (Italy) Giovanni Venturini	(Germany) Attempto Racing	DNS	19	Ret					0
	(Germany) Manuel Metzger	(Germany) Black Falcon	19	Ret						0
	(Belgium) Bertrand Baguette	(Germany) Attempto Racing		19	Ret					0
	(Italy) Luca Filippi	(Germany) Attempto Racing	DNS							0
	(Italy) Luca Filippi	(Italy) Orange 1 Team Lazarus			21	30	20	21		0
	(Finland) Markus Palttala	(Germany) Rowe Racing		41	Ret				Ret	0
	(Finland) Markus Palttala	(Germany) Walkenhorst Motorsport				21	23	20		0
	(Finland) Matias Henkola	(Germany) Walkenhorst Motorsport		42		21	23	20	DNS	0
	(Republic of Ireland) Matt Griffin	(Germany) Black Falcon			20					0
	(Republic of Ireland) Matt Griffin	(Italy) AF Corse				26	29	23		0
	(Italy) Andrea Amici (Italy) Stefano Costantini (Denmark) Dennis Lind	(Italy) Raton Racing	20	27	37					0
	(France) Ludovic Badey (Switzerland) Daniele Perfetti	(France) AKKA ASP	Ret	32	Ret	56	50	Ret	21	0
	(Belgium) Jacques Duyver (South Africa) David Perel (Italy) Marco Zanuttini	(Switzerland) Kessel Racing	Ret	39	28	29	26	22	39	0
	(Italy) Niki Cadei	(Switzerland) Kessel Racing				29	26	22		0
	(United States) Dore Chaponick Jr. (United States) Scott Heckert (United States) Brett Sandberg	(Germany) Black Falcon	Ret	40	22	27	47	Ret	38	0
	(United Kingdom) Nick Leventis	(United Kingdom) Strakka Racing	WD		38	28	48	Ret	22	0
	(United Kingdom) Duncan Cameron (Italy) Riccardo Ragazzi (United Kingdom) Aaron Scott	(Italy) AF Corse				26	29	23		0
	(United Kingdom) Rory Butcher	(Switzerland) Spirit of Race		33		23	38	Ret		0
	(United Kingdom) Josh Caygill (Australia) Jonathan Venter	(Belgium) Team WRT	24	31	25	25	42	Ret	34	0
	(Austria) Nikolaus Mayr-Melnhof	(Belgium) Team WRT	24	31		25	42	Ret		0
	(United Kingdom) Richard Abra (Russia) Leo Machitski	(United Kingdom) Barwell Motorsport	Ret	26	24	57	49	Ret	27	0
	(Portugal) Miguel Ramos	(United Kingdom) Barwell Motorsport	Ret	26	24	57	49	Ret		0
	(Germany) Jürgen Häring (Germany) Alfred Renauer (Germany) Robert Renauer	(Germany) Herberth Motorsport	25	28	27	37	54	Ret	29	0
	(Germany) Pierre Ehret (Italy) Rino Mastronardi	(Germany) Rinaldi Racing	Ret	35	31	39	28	25	32	0
	(Belgium) Patrick Van Glabeke (Italy) Gabriele Lancieri	(Germany) Rinaldi Racing				39	28	25		0
	(United Kingdom) Richard Lyons	(Belgium) Team WRT				25	42	Ret		0
	(Switzerland) Hugo de Sadeleer	(Belgium) Team WRT			25					0
	(Poland) Artur Janosz	(Italy) Orange 1 Team Lazarus							25	0
	(France) Clément Mateu	(Germany) Attempto Racing	26	30	Ret	45	35	31		0
	(France) Clément Mateu	(Belgium) Team WRT							34	0
	(Switzerland) Giorgio Maggi	(Germany) Attempto Racing	26	30	Ret	45	35	31		0
	(Netherlands) Max van Splunteren	(Germany) Attempto Racing	26	30	Ret	50	39	35	33	0
	(Germany) Henry Walkenhorst	(Germany) Walkenhorst Motorsport		42	30	41	33	26	DNS	0
	(Germany) David Schiwietz	(Germany) Walkenhorst Motorsport		42	30	41	33	26		0
	(Belgium) Stef Van Campenhout	(Germany) Walkenhorst Motorsport			30	41	33	26		0
	(Germany) Ralf Oeverhaus	(Germany) Walkenhorst Motorsport				41	33	26		0
	(Netherlands) Jeroen Bleekemolen	(Germany) Black Falcon				27	47	Ret		0
	(Netherlands) Jeroen Bleekemolen	(United Kingdom) Barwell Motorsport							27	0
	(France) Marc Rostan	(France) Saintéloc Racing	Ret	36	Ret	40	31	27		0
	(France) Marc Rostan	(Austria) Team HB Racing							37	0
	(Belgium) Christian Kelders	(France) Saintéloc Racing	Ret	36	Ret	40	31	27		0
	(Belgium) Frédéric Bouvy	(France) Saintéloc Racing				40	31	27		0
	(United Kingdom) Abbie Eaton	(Italy) AF Corse	27							0
	(Belgium) Bernard Delhez	(Austria) Team HB Racing	28	43	Ret	43	34	28	37	0
	(France) Gilles Vannelet	(Austria) Team HB Racing	28	43	Ret	43	34	28		0
	(Germany) Mike Stursberg	(Austria) Team HB Racing		43	Ret	43	34	28		0
	(Switzerland) Christopher Zanella	(Austria) Team HB Racing				43	34	28		0
	(United Kingdom) Craig Fleming	(United Kingdom) Strakka Racing	Ret		38	28	48	Ret		0
	(Switzerland) Daniel Allemann (Germany) Ralf Bohn (France) Mathieu Jaminet (Germany) Sven Müller	(Germany) Herberth Motorsport				36	37	29		0
	(Malaysia) Jazeman Jaafar (United Kingdom) Andrew Watson	(United Kingdom) Strakka Racing	Ret	29	36	58	58	Ret	Ret	0
	(United Kingdom) Dean Stoneman	(United Kingdom) Strakka Racing	Ret	29	36					0
	(United Kingdom) Oliver Gavin	(United Kingdom) Barwell Motorsport				42	30	Ret		0
	(Belgium) Sarah Bovy (Germany) Jürgen Krebs	(Germany) Attempto Racing				45	35	31		0
	(Finland) Rory Penttinen	(Germany) Rinaldi Racing			31					0
	(United Kingdom) Chris Goodwin (United Kingdom) Chris Harris (Sweden) Alexander West	(United Kingdom) Garage 59		Ret		52	41	32		0
	(United Kingdom) Bradley Ellis	(United Kingdom) Garage 59				52	41	32		0
	(Japan) Tatsuya Kataoka (Japan) Kamui Kobayashi (Japan) Nobuteru Taniguchi	(Japan) Good Smile Racing with Team UKYO				32	43	Ret		0
	(Germany) Immanuel Vinke	(Germany) Team Zakspeed	32	Ret						0
	(Germany) Luca Ludwig	(Germany) Team Zakspeed	32							0
	(Andorra) Manel Cerqueda Diez (Spain) Isaac Tutumlu	(Germany) Attempto Racing							33	0
	(Netherlands) Jaap van Lagen	(Germany) Walkenhorst Motorsport	Ret							0
	(Netherlands) Jaap van Lagen	(Germany) Attempto Racing				50	39	35		0
	(Canada) Mikaël Grenier	(Germany) Attempto Racing				50	39	35		0
	(Czech Republic) Tomáš Enge (Finland) Marko Helistekangas (Australia) Caitlin Wood	(Germany) Reiter Young Stars			Ret				35	0
	(Italy) Mauro Ricci	(France) AKKA ASP							36	0
	(Germany) Marc Lieb	(Germany) Herberth Motorsport				37	54	Ret		0
	(Germany) Edward Lewis Brauner	(Austria) Team HB Racing							37	0
	(Finland) Jesse Krohn	(Germany) Rowe Racing		41						0
	(France) Tom Dillmann (Italy) Giorgio Roda (Italy) Paolo Ruberti	(Austria) GRT Grasser Racing Team							41	0
	(Portugal) Rui Águas (Argentina) José Manuel Balbiani (Greece) Kriton Lendoudis	(Germany) Team Zakspeed	Ret	45						0
	(United Kingdom) Phil Keen	(United Kingdom) Barwell Motorsport				57	49	Ret		0
	(United Kingdom) Will Stevens	(Belgium) Belgian Audi Club Team WRT	Ret	Ret	Ret				Ret	
	(Italy) Beniamino Caccia (Germany) Jörg Viebahn	(Germany) Team Zakspeed		Ret						
	(Germany) Maro Engel	(Germany) Black Falcon			Ret					
	(China) Anthony Liu	(China) BBT			Ret					
	(France) Grégory Guilvert	(France) Saintéloc Racing			Ret					
	(Netherlands) Steijn Schothorst	(United Kingdom) Strakka Racing							Ret	
	(United States) Ace Robey	(Germany) Walkenhorst Motorsport							DNS	
Drivers ineligible to score points
	(Belgium) Thierry de Latre du Bosqueau (Belgium) Grégory Paisse (Belgium) Pierre-Yves Paque (Belgium) Louis-Philippe Soenen	(Belgium) SpeedLover				49	40	34		
	(United States) Howard Blank (France) Yannick Mallegol (United States) Frank Mechaly (Monaco) Fabrice Notari	(France) RMS				53	53	Ret		
Pos.	Driver	Team	MNZ (Italy)	SIL (United Kingdom)	LEC (France)	6hrs	12hrs	24hrs	CAT (Spain)	Points
Pos.	Driver	Team	MNZ (Italy)	SIL (United Kingdom)	LEC (France)	SPA (Belgium)			CAT (Spain)	Points

Key
Colour	Result
Gold	Race winner
Silver	2nd place
Bronze	3rd place
Green	Points finish
Blue	Non-points finish
Blue	Non-classified finish (NC)
Purple	Did not finish (Ret)
Black	Disqualified (DSQ)
Black	Excluded (EX)
White	Did not start (DNS)
White	Race cancelled (C)
White	Withdrew (WD)
Blank	Did not participate

**Bold** – Pole
Italics – Fastest Lap

==== Pro-Am Cup ====
Pos.	Driver	Team	MNZ (Italy)	SIL (United Kingdom)	LEC (France)	SPA (Belgium)			CAT (Spain)	Points
Pos.	Driver	Team	MNZ (Italy)	SIL (United Kingdom)	LEC (France)	6hrs	12hrs	24hrs	CAT (Spain)	Points
1	(United Kingdom) Jonathan Adam (Oman) Ahmad Al Harthy	Oman Racing Team with TF Sport	**7**	21	14	**9**	14	15	26	116
2	(Croatia) Martin Kodrić (Finland) Patrick Kujala	(United Kingdom) Barwell Motorsport	23	20	12	42	30	Ret	16	87
3	(Turkey) Salih Yoluç	Oman Racing Team with TF Sport			14	**9**	14	15	26	72
4	(Switzerland) Adrian Amstutz	(United Kingdom) Barwell Motorsport	23	20	12	42	30	Ret		62
5	(United Kingdom) Oliver Morley (Spain) Miguel Toril	(Germany) Black Falcon	19	Ret	20	14	12	12	30	62
6	(Germany) Nico Bastian	(France) AKKA ASP	17	**22**	15	56	50	Ret	21	60
7	(Germany) Marvin Kirchhöfer	(Germany) Black Falcon				14	12	12	30	47
8	(Germany) Maximilian Götz	(Germany) Black Falcon				14	12	12		46
9	(France) Jean-Luc Beaubelique (France) Jules Gounon	(France) AKKA ASP	17	**22**	15				**36**	46
10	(Germany) Alexander Mattschull (Russia) Rinat Salikhov	(Germany) Rinaldi Racing	16	EX	19	54	56	Ret	20	42
11	(United Kingdom) Euan Hankey	Oman Racing Team with TF Sport				**9**	14	15		40
12	(United Kingdom) Hunter Abbott	(Germany) HTP Motorsport		25						37
12	(United Kingdom) Hunter Abbott	(United Kingdom) Barwell Motorsport							16	37
13	(Netherlands) Niek Hommerson (Belgium) Louis Machiels	(Switzerland) Spirit of Race	15	33	17	23	38	Ret	Ret	35
14	(Poland) Michał Broniszewski	(Switzerland) Kessel Racing	8	44	**32**	22	17	Ret	28	34
15	(Italy) Andrea Bertolini	(Switzerland) Spirit of Race	15		17	23	38	Ret	Ret	34
16	(Germany) Daniel Keilwitz	(Germany) Rinaldi Racing	16	EX					20	30
17	(Italy) Matteo Cressoni (Italy) Andrea Rizzoli	(Switzerland) Kessel Racing	8	44	**32**	22	17	Ret		30
18	(Monaco) Olivier Beretta (Italy) Lorenzo Bontempelli (Japan) Motoaki Ishikawa	(Italy) AF Corse	Ret	38	Ret	34	25	19	24	26
19	(Italy) Davide Rizzo (Finland) Toni Vilander	(China) BBT			Ret					25
19	(Italy) Davide Rizzo (Finland) Toni Vilander	(Switzerland) Spirit of Race				24	15	17		25
20	(Lebanon) Alex Demirdjian (France) Nicolas Minassian	(Switzerland) Spirit of Race				24	15	17		25
21	(Finland) Matias Henkola (Norway) Christian Krognes (Germany) Nico Menzel (Finland) Markus Palttala	(Germany) Walkenhorst Motorsport				21	23	20		21
22	(Republic of Ireland) Matt Griffin	(Germany) Black Falcon			20					21
22	(Republic of Ireland) Matt Griffin	(Italy) AF Corse				26	29	23		21
23	(Republic of Ireland) Damien Faulkner (United States) Mike Skeen	(Germany) HTP Motorsport	18	25						20
24	(United Kingdom) Richard Abra (Russia) Leo Machitski	(United Kingdom) Barwell Motorsport	Ret	26	24	57	49	Ret	27	20
25	(France) Ludovic Badey (Switzerland) Daniele Perfetti	(France) AKKA ASP	Ret	32	Ret	56	50	Ret	21	17
26	(Monaco) Francesco Castellacci	(Italy) AF Corse				34	25	19		16
27	(Italy) Giacomo Piccini	(Switzerland) Kessel Racing				22	17	Ret	28	15
28	(Portugal) Miguel Ramos	(United Kingdom) Barwell Motorsport	Ret	26	24	57	49	Ret		14
29	(United Kingdom) Lewis Williamson	(United Kingdom) Strakka Racing	Ret		38	28	48	Ret	22	12
30	(United Kingdom) Nick Leventis	(United Kingdom) Strakka Racing	WD		38	28	48	Ret	22	12
31	(Italy) Matteo Malucelli	(Germany) Rinaldi Racing			19	54	56	Ret		12
32	(Italy) David Fumanelli	(United Kingdom) Strakka Racing							22	12
33	(Italy) Andrea Amici (Italy) Stefano Costantini (Denmark) Dennis Lind	(Italy) Raton Racing	20	27	37					12
34	(United Kingdom) Duncan Cameron (Italy) Riccardo Ragazzi (United Kingdom) Aaron Scott	(Italy) AF Corse				26	29	23		12
35	(Germany) Jürgen Häring (Germany) Alfred Renauer (Germany) Robert Renauer	(Germany) Herberth Motorsport	25	28	27	37	54	Ret	29	10
36	(Italy) Gian Maria Gabbiani	(Germany) HTP Motorsport	18							8
37	(Saudi Arabia) Abdulaziz Bin Turki Al Faisal (Germany) Hubert Haupt (Italy) Gabriele Piana (Netherlands) Renger van der Zande	(Germany) Black Falcon				19	45	Ret		7
38	(Switzerland) Daniel Allemann (Germany) Ralf Bohn (France) Mathieu Jaminet (Germany) Sven Müller	(Germany) Herberth Motorsport				36	37	29		7
39	(United States) Dore Chaponick Jr. (United States) Scott Heckert (United States) Brett Sandberg	(Germany) Black Falcon	Ret	40	22	27	47	Ret	38	6
40	(Netherlands) Jeroen Bleekemolen	(Germany) Black Falcon				27	47	Ret		6
40	(Netherlands) Jeroen Bleekemolen	(United Kingdom) Barwell Motorsport							27	6
41	(Germany) Manuel Metzger	(Germany) Black Falcon	19	Ret						6
42	(United Kingdom) Rory Butcher	(Switzerland) Spirit of Race		33		23	38	Ret		5
43	(Netherlands) Max van Splunteren	(Germany) Attempto Racing	26	30	Ret				33	4
44	(France) Clément Mateu	(Germany) Attempto Racing	26	30	Ret					4
44	(France) Clément Mateu	(Belgium) Team WRT							34	4
45	(Switzerland) Giorgio Maggi	(Germany) Attempto Racing	26	30	Ret					4
46	(United Kingdom) Josh Caygill (Australia) Jonathan Venter	(Belgium) Team WRT			25	25	42	Ret	34	4
47	(Switzerland) Alex Fontana	(France) AKKA ASP	Ret	32	Ret	56	50	Ret		2
48	(United Kingdom) Richard Lyons (Austria) Nikolaus Mayr-Melnhof	(Belgium) Team WRT				25	42	Ret		2
49	(United Kingdom) Oliver Gavin	(United Kingdom) Barwell Motorsport				42	30	Ret		2
50	(Switzerland) Hugo de Sadeleer	(Belgium) Team WRT			25					2
51	(Italy) Mauro Ricci	(France) AKKA ASP							**36**	1
	(Andorra) Manel Cerqueda Diez (Spain) Isaac Tutumlu	(Germany) Attempto Racing							33	0
	(United Kingdom) Craig Fleming	(United Kingdom) Strakka Racing	Ret		38	28	48	Ret		0
	(United Kingdom) Oliver Webb	(United Kingdom) Strakka Racing				28	48	Ret		0
	(Belgium) Christian Kelders (France) Marc Rostan	(France) Saintéloc Racing	Ret	36	Ret					0
	(Germany) Christopher Haase	(France) Saintéloc Racing	Ret	36						0
	(Germany) Marc Lieb	(Germany) Herberth Motorsport				37	54	Ret		0
	(Portugal) Rui Águas (Argentina) José Manuel Balbiani (Greece) Kriton Lendoudis	(Germany) Team Zakspeed	Ret	45						0
	(United Kingdom) Phil Keen	(United Kingdom) Barwell Motorsport				57	49	Ret		0
	(Austria) Norbert Siedler	(Germany) Rinaldi Racing				54	56	Ret		0
	(China) Anthony Liu	(China) BBT			Ret					
	(France) Grégory Guilvert	(France) Saintéloc Racing			Ret					
Pos.	Driver	Team	MNZ (Italy)	SIL (United Kingdom)	LEC (France)	6hrs	12hrs	24hrs	CAT (Spain)	Points
Pos.	Driver	Team	MNZ (Italy)	SIL (United Kingdom)	LEC (France)	SPA (Belgium)			CAT (Spain)	Points

==== Am Cup ====
Pos.	Driver	Team	MNZ (Italy)	SIL (United Kingdom)	LEC (France)	SPA (Belgium)			CAT (Spain)	Points
Pos.	Driver	Team	MNZ (Italy)	SIL (United Kingdom)	LEC (France)	6hrs	12hrs	24hrs	CAT (Spain)	Points
1	(Belgium) Jacques Duyver (South Africa) David Perel (Italy) Marco Zanuttini	(Switzerland) Kessel Racing	Ret	**39**	28	**29**	26	22	**39**	118
2	(Germany) Pierre Ehret (Italy) Rino Mastronardi	(Germany) Rinaldi Racing	**Ret**	35	**31**	39	28	25	32	107
3	(Belgium) Bernard Delhez	(Austria) Team HB Racing	28	43	Ret	43	34	28	37	68
4	(Germany) Henry Walkenhorst	(Germany) Walkenhorst Motorsport		42	30	41	33	26	DNS	66
5	(Germany) David Schiwietz	(Germany) Walkenhorst Motorsport		42	30	41	33	26		66
6	(Belgium) Stef Van Campenhout	(Germany) Walkenhorst Motorsport			30	41	33	26		51
7	(Italy) Niki Cadei	(Switzerland) Kessel Racing				**29**	26	22		50
8	(France) Gilles Vannelet	(Austria) Team HB Racing	28	43	Ret	43	34	28		50
9	(France) Marc Rostan	(France) Saintéloc Racing				40	31	27		44
9	(France) Marc Rostan	(Austria) Team HB Racing							37	44
10	(Belgium) Patrick Van Glabeke (Italy) Gabriele Lancieri	(Germany) Rinaldi Racing				39	28	25		36
11	(Germany) Mike Stursberg	(Austria) Team HB Racing		43	Ret	43	34	28		32
12	(Germany) Ralf Oeverhaus	(Germany) Walkenhorst Motorsport				41	33	26		27
13	(Belgium) Frédéric Bouvy (Belgium) Christian Kelders	(France) Saintéloc Racing				40	31	27		26
14	(Lebanon) Alex Demirdjian (United Kingdom) Abbie Eaton (Italy) Davide Rizzo	(Italy) AF Corse	27							25
15	(Finland) Rory Penttinen	(Germany) Rinaldi Racing			**31**					20
16	(Switzerland) Christopher Zanella	(Austria) Team HB Racing				43	34	28		20
17	(Germany) Edward Lewis Brauner	(Austria) Team HB Racing							37	18
18	(Belgium) Sarah Bovy (Germany) Jürgen Krebs (Switzerland) Giorgio Maggi (France) Clément Mateu	(Germany) Attempto Racing				45	35	31		16
19	(Finland) Matias Henkola	(Germany) Walkenhorst Motorsport		42					DNS	15
20	(United Kingdom) Chris Goodwin (United Kingdom) Chris Harris (Sweden) Alexander West	(United Kingdom) Garage 59		Ret		52	41	32		12
21	(United Kingdom) Bradley Ellis	(United Kingdom) Garage 59				52	41	32		12
	(Italy) Beniamino Caccia (Germany) Jörg Viebahn (Germany) Immanuel Vinke	(Germany) Team Zakspeed		Ret						
	(United States) Ace Robey	(Germany) Walkenhorst Motorsport							DNS	
Pos.	Driver	Team	MNZ (Italy)	SIL (United Kingdom)	LEC (France)	6hrs	12hrs	24hrs	CAT (Spain)	Points
Pos.	Driver	Team	MNZ (Italy)	SIL (United Kingdom)	LEC (France)	SPA (Belgium)			CAT (Spain)	Points

=== Teams' championships ===
==== Overall ====
Pos.	Team	Manufacturer	MNZ (Italy)	SIL (United Kingdom)	LEC (France)	SPA (Belgium)			CAT (Spain)	Points
Pos.	Team	Manufacturer	MNZ (Italy)	SIL (United Kingdom)	LEC (France)	6hrs	12hrs	24hrs	CAT (Spain)	Points
1	(United Kingdom) Bentley Team M-Sport	Bentley	6	5	1	5	5	2	19	88
2	(Austria) GRT Grasser Racing Team	Lamborghini	1	1	13	2	1	Ret	3	87
3	(France) (Mercedes-AMG Team) AKKA ASP	Mercedes-Benz	17	**3**	4	10	4	3	1	83
4	(Germany) (MANN-FILTER/Mercedes-AMG Team) HTP Motorsport	Mercedes-Benz	3	2	18	3	2	7	4	73
5	(Russia) SMP Racing	Ferrari	5	4	2	51	36	24	Ret	48
6	(Belgium) Audi Sport/Belgian Audi Club Team WRT	Audi	Ret	Ret	3	4	8	5	9	48
7	(Italy) AF Corse/Kaspersky Motorsport	Ferrari	**2**	6	23	**1**	3	19	15	48
8	(Belgium) Team WRT	Audi	12	13	6	25	42	Ret	**2**	30
9	(Germany) (Mercedes-AMG Team) Black Falcon	Mercedes-Benz	10	40	**20**	13	7	8	5	28
10	(Germany) Rowe Racing	BMW		7	Ret	15	6	10	12	21
11	(United Kingdom) Motul Team RJN Motorsport/Nissan	Nissan	13	16	5	17	16	13	13	19
12	Oman Racing Team with TF Sport	Aston Martin	7	21	14	9	14	15	26	17
13	(Czech Republic) ISR	Audi	29	Ret	7	59	59	Ret	8	14
14	(United Kingdom) Strakka Motorsport/Racing	McLaren	9	8	16	28	44	Ret	14	8
15	(Switzerland) Kessel Racing	Ferrari	8	39	28	22	17	22	28	6
16	(Switzerland) Emil Frey Jaguar Racing	Jaguar	31	10	34	46	55	Ret	10	6
17	(France) Saintéloc Racing	Audi	Ret	36	9	40	31	27	17	4
18	(United Kingdom) Barwell Motorsport	Lamborghini	23	20	12	42	30	Ret	16	2
19	(Italy) Ombra Racing	Lamborghini	22	15	Ret	35	24	16	23	2
	(Italy) Orange 1 Team Lazarus	Lamborghini	21	14	21	30	20	21	25	0
	(Switzerland) Spirit of Race	Ferrari	15	33	17	23	15	17	Ret	0
	(Germany) Rinaldi Racing	Ferrari	16	35	19	39	28	25	20	0
	(Germany) Walkenhorst Motorsport	BMW	Ret	18	26	21	23	20	Ret	0
	(Germany) Attempto Racing	Lamborghini	26	19	Ret	45	35	31	33	0
	(Italy) Raton Racing	Lamborghini	20	27	37					0
	(Germany) Herberth Motorsport	Porsche	25	28	27	36	37	29	29	0
	(Austria) Team HB Racing	Lamborghini	28	43	Ret	43	34	28	37	0
	(United Kingdom) Garage 59	McLaren		Ret		52	41	32		0
	(Japan) Good Smile Racing with Team UKYO	Mercedes-Benz				32	43	Ret		0
	(Germany) Team Zakspeed	Mercedes-Benz	32	45						0
	(Germany) Reiter Young Stars	Lamborghini			Ret				35	0
	(China) BBT	Ferrari			Ret					
Teams ineligible to score points
	(France) Audi Sport Team Saintéloc	Audi				7	13	1		
	(Germany) KÜS TEAM75 Bernhard	Porsche				20	11	4		
	(Czech Republic) Audi Sport Team ISR	Audi				8	9	9		
	(Germany) Bentley Team ABT	Bentley				16	18	Ret		
	(Belgium) SpeedLover	Porsche				49	40	34		
	(France) RMS	Porsche				53	53	Ret		
Pos.	Team	Manufacturer	MNZ (Italy)	SIL (United Kingdom)	LEC (France)	6hrs	12hrs	24hrs	CAT (Spain)	Points
Pos.	Team	Manufacturer	MNZ (Italy)	SIL (United Kingdom)	LEC (France)	SPA (Belgium)			CAT (Spain)	Points

==== Pro-Am Cup ====
Pos.	Team	Manufacturer	MNZ (Italy)	SIL (United Kingdom)	LEC (France)	SPA (Belgium)			CAT (Spain)	Points
Pos.	Team	Manufacturer	MNZ (Italy)	SIL (United Kingdom)	LEC (France)	6hrs	12hrs	24hrs	CAT (Spain)	Points
1	Oman Racing Team with TF Sport	Aston Martin	**7**	21	14	**9**	14	15	26	116
2	(United Kingdom) Barwell Motorsport	Lamborghini	23	20	12	42	30	Ret	16	88
3	(Germany) Black Falcon	Mercedes-Benz	19	40	20	14	12	12	30	63
4	(France) AKKA ASP	Mercedes-Benz	17	**22**	15	56	50	Ret	**21**	61
5	(Switzerland) Spirit of Race	Ferrari	15	33	17	23	15	17	Ret	61
6	(Germany) Rinaldi Racing	Ferrari	16	EX	19	54	56	Ret	20	42
7	(Switzerland) Kessel Racing	Ferrari	8	44	**32**	22	17	Ret	28	39
8	(Italy) AF Corse	Ferrari	Ret	38	Ret	26	25	19	24	30
9	(Germany) Herberth Motorsport	Porsche	25	28	27	36	37	29	29	28
10	(Germany) Walkenhorst Motorsport	BMW				21	23	20		22
11	(Germany) HTP Motorsport	Mercedes-Benz	18	25						20
12	(Italy) Raton Racing	Lamborghini	20	27	37					15
13	(United Kingdom) Strakka Racing	McLaren	Ret		38	28	48	Ret	22	14
14	(Belgium) Team WRT	Audi			25	25	42	Ret	34	11
15	(Germany) Attempto Racing	Lamborghini	26	30	Ret				33	7
16	(France) Saintéloc Racing	Audi	Ret	36	Ret					2
	(Germany) Team Zakspeed	Mercedes-Benz	Ret	45						0
	(China) BBT	Ferrari			Ret					
Pos.	Team	Manufacturer	MNZ (Italy)	SIL (United Kingdom)	LEC (France)	6hrs	12hrs	24hrs	CAT (Spain)	Points
Pos.	Team	Manufacturer	MNZ (Italy)	SIL (United Kingdom)	LEC (France)	SPA (Belgium)			CAT (Spain)	Points

==== Am Cup ====
Pos.	Team	Manufacturer	MNZ (Italy)	SIL (United Kingdom)	LEC (France)	SPA (Belgium)			CAT (Spain)	Points
Pos.	Team	Manufacturer	MNZ (Italy)	SIL (United Kingdom)	LEC (France)	6hrs	12hrs	24hrs	CAT (Spain)	Points
1	(Switzerland) Kessel Racing	Ferrari	Ret	**39**	28	**29**	26	22	**39**	118
2	(Germany) Rinaldi Racing	Ferrari	**Ret**	35	**31**	39	28	25	32	107
3	(Austria) Team HB Racing	Lamborghini	28	43	Ret	43	34	28	37	68
4	(Germany) Walkenhorst Motorsport	BMW		42	30	41	33	26	DNS	66
5	(France) Saintéloc Racing	Audi				40	31	27		26
6	(Italy) AF Corse	Ferrari	27							25
7	(Germany) Attempto Racing	Lamborghini				45	35	31		16
8	(United Kingdom) Garage 59	McLaren		Ret		52	41	32		12
	(Germany) Team Zakspeed	Mercedes-Benz		Ret						
Pos.	Team	Manufacturer	MNZ (Italy)	SIL (United Kingdom)	LEC (France)	6hrs	12hrs	24hrs	CAT (Spain)	Points
Pos.	Team	Manufacturer	MNZ (Italy)	SIL (United Kingdom)	LEC (France)	SPA (Belgium)			CAT (Spain)	Points

== See also ==
- 2017 Blancpain GT Series
- 2017 Blancpain GT Series Sprint Cup
- 2017 Blancpain GT Series Asia
