= Audi Sport TT Cup =

One-make super car racing series

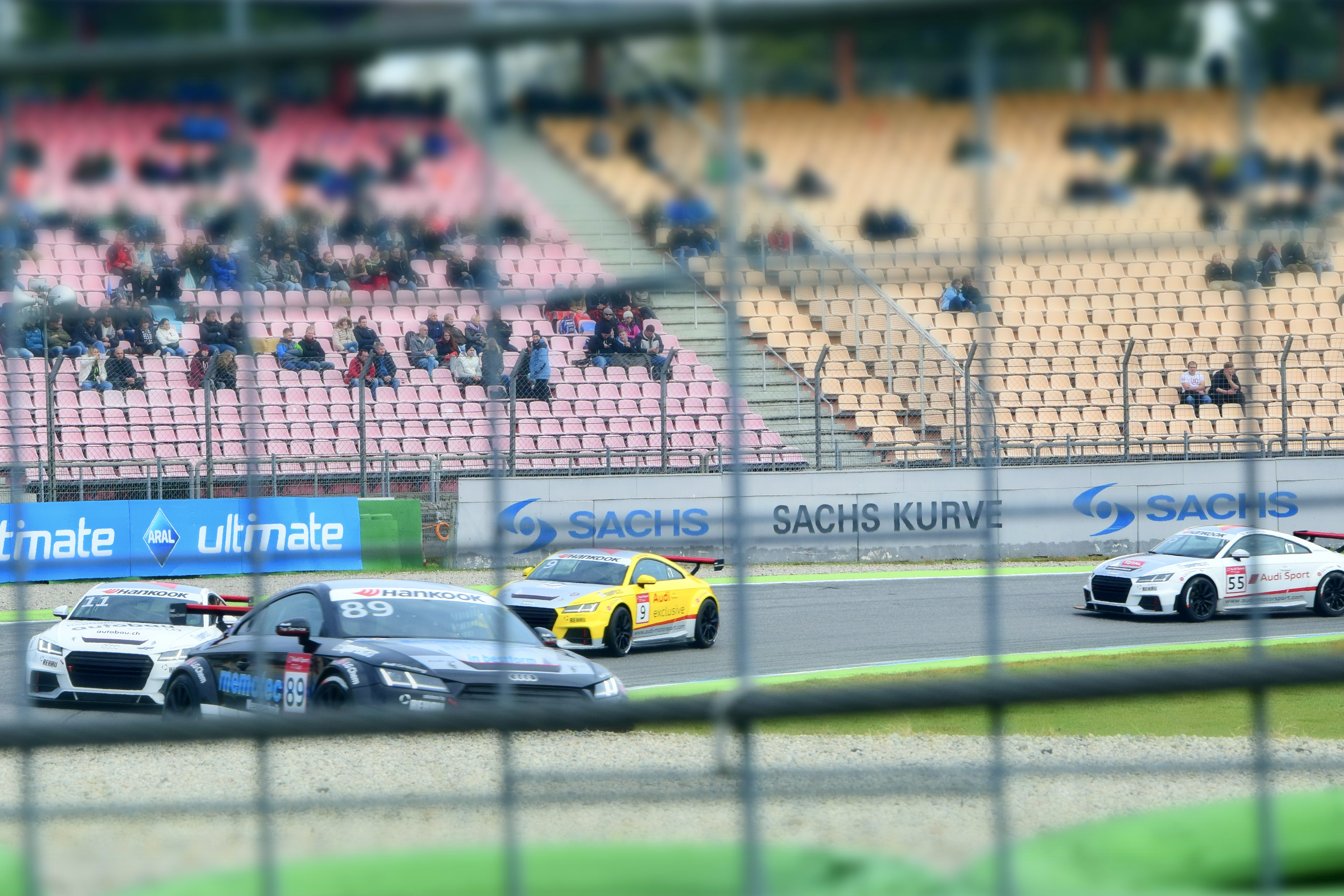
- TT Cup cars racing at the Hockenheimring in 2015
- Category: One-make grand touring super car racing by Audi
- Country: Germany
- Inaugural season: 2015
- Folded: 2017
- Constructors: Audi
- Engine suppliers: Audi
- Tyre suppliers: Hankook
- Official website: Official website

The Audi Sport TT Cup was a one-make super car racing series by Audi based in Germany first held in 2015. Audi Sport TT Cup cars based on the Audi TT. It was a support series for the Deutsche Tourenwagen Masters, replacing the Volkswagen Scirocco R-Cup. For the 2018 season, Abt Sportsline was scheduled to take over the organization of the championship however due to lack of entries, Audi Sport Abt TT Cup were cancelled and thus replaced by Audi Sport Seyffarth R8 LMS Cup.

== Specifications ==
- Engine displacement: Volkswagen-Audi EA113 1,984 cc (121 cu in) DOHC inline-4
- Gearbox: 6-speed S-tronic paddle shift gearbox
- Weight: 2,480 lb (1,125 kg)
- Power output: 310 + 30 hp (231 + 22 kW) with push-to-pass
- Fuel: Aral Ultimate Racing 102 RON unleaded
- Fuel capacity: 26.4 US gallons (100 litres)
- Fuel delivery: Gasoline direct injection
- Aspiration: Single-turbocharged
- Length: 4,260 mm (168 in)
- Width: 1,994 mm (79 in)
- Steering: Electric progressive steering

== Champions ==
Season	Champion
2015	(Poland) Jan Kisiel
2016	(Finland) Joonas Lappalainen
2017	(United Kingdom) Philip Ellis
