= Marta García (racing driver) =

Spanish professional racing driver (born 2000)

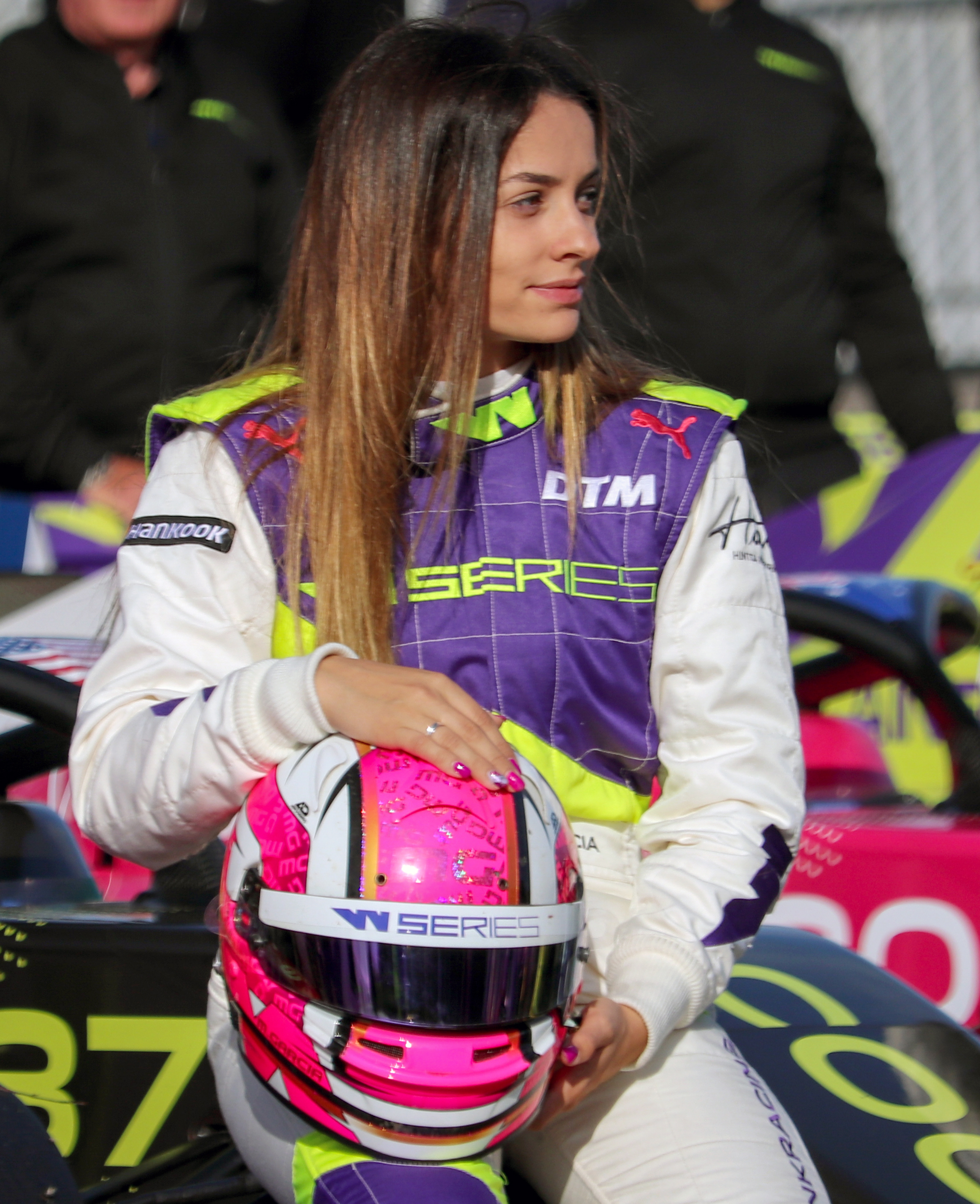
- García in 2019
- Nationality: (Spain) Spanish
- Born: Marta García López; 9 August 2000 (age 26) Dénia, Spain

Le Mans Cup career
- Debut season: 2025
- Current team: Iron Dames
- Categorisation: FIA Silver
- Car number: 83
- Starts: 5 (7 entries)
- Wins: 1
- Podiums: 2
- Poles: 1
- Fastest laps: 1
- Best finish: 4th in 2025

Previous series
- 2024; 2023; 2019–2022; 2017; 2016–2017: FR European; F1 Academy; W Series; SMP F4; F4 Spanish

Championship titles
- 2015 2017 2023: Karting Academy Trophy; Spanish F4 Female Trophy; F1 Academy

Marta García López (born 9 August 2000) is a Spanish racing driver who last competed in the 2025 Le Mans Cup with Iron Dames in GT3. She previously competed in F1 Academy for the team in 2023, becoming the inaugural champion of the series with two races to spare. She is a race winner in the W Series and won karting titles including the CIK-FIA Karting Academy Trophy and the Trofeo delle Industrie in 2015.

== Personal life ==
Marta García López was born in Dénia, Spain on 9 August 2000.

== Career ==
García started her motorsports career in kart racing, where she won titles including the CIK-FIA Karting Academy Trophy and the Trofeo delle Industrie in 2015, which had previously been won by three Formula One World Drivers' Champions: Fernando Alonso, Lewis Hamilton, and Sebastian Vettel.

=== F4 Spanish Championship ===
In 2016, García made her single-seater debut as a guest driver for Drivex in the second half of the F4 Spanish Championship.

In 2017, García joined MP Motorsport to contest the full F4 Spanish Championship. Her best race result was a fifth place at Circuito de Jerez and she finished the season in ninth overall. She also participated in a single round of the SMP F4 Championship.

=== Formula One ===
In 2017, García joined the Renault Sport Academy but was dropped after one season.

=== W Series ===
In 2019, García took part in the inaugural W Series, finishing fourth in the championship. She took one victory and one pole position at the Norisring event.

García was set to contest the 2020 championship before it was cancelled in response to the COVID-19 pandemic. A ten-event eSports series was held on iRacing in its place, with García taking second place in the championship.

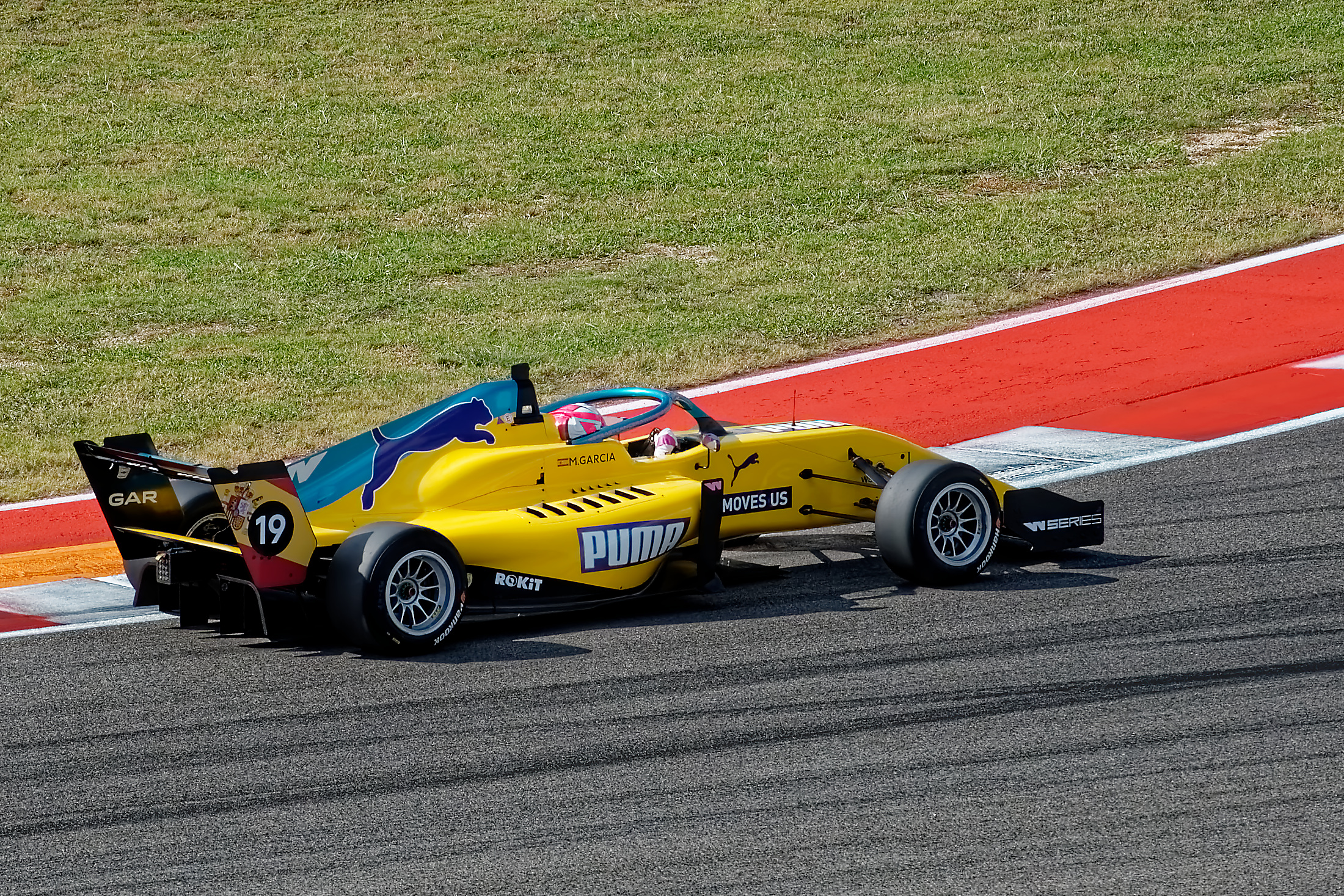
García competing in W Series at the Circuit of the Americas in October 2021.

García joined the newly-formed Puma team for the 2021 W Series season. She initially qualified in seventh place for the opening round of the season at the Red Bull Ring, but retired on lap twelve with when her car developed mechanical problems. Four non-points finishes and only a single podium followed, which left García twelfth in the standings at the end of the season.

García returned for the 2022 W Series, racing for the CortDAO W Series Team, and was sixth in the points standings with one pole and one podium when the series ended early for financial reasons.

In early 2023, W Series announced the series was no longer running, at which point she was now racing in F1 Academy. García left W Series with one win, four podiums, and two poles.

=== F1 Academy ===
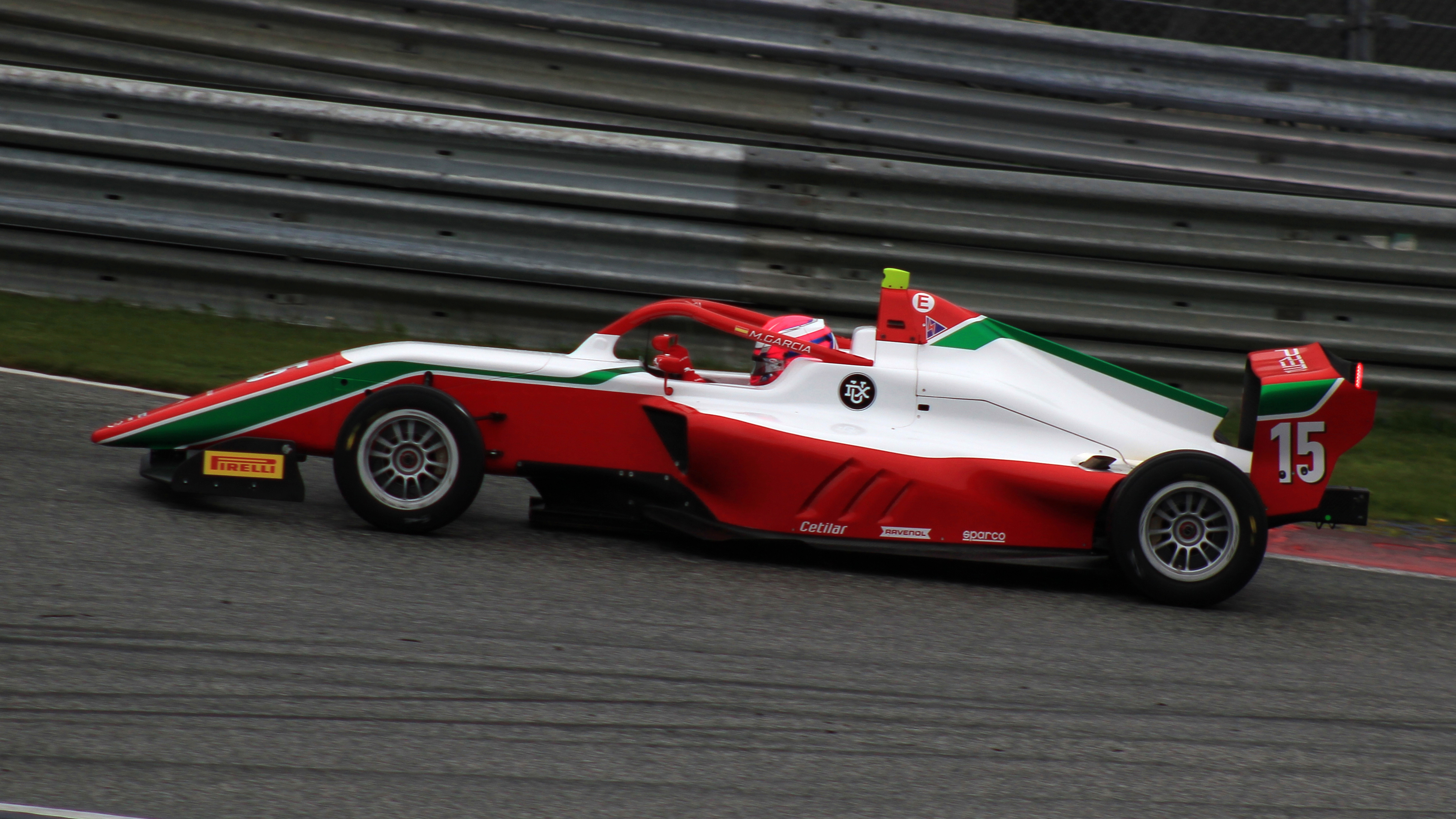
García won the inaugural F1 Academy championship.

On 21 March 2023, García was confirmed to be driving in the newly launched all-female F1 Academy series, for the Prema Racing team.

García began the season at the Red Bull Ring, taking pole position for races 1 and 3, then winning those races. At Circuit Ricardo Tormo, García qualified in pole position for races one and two; however, she was later judged to have track limit infringements during the first qualifying session and lost pole position for race one.

During the final round at Circuit of the Americas in race one of three of the weekend, García secured the inaugural F1 Academy championship. She ended the season with seven wins and five poles, the most of any driver on that lineup.

=== Formula Regional European Championship ===
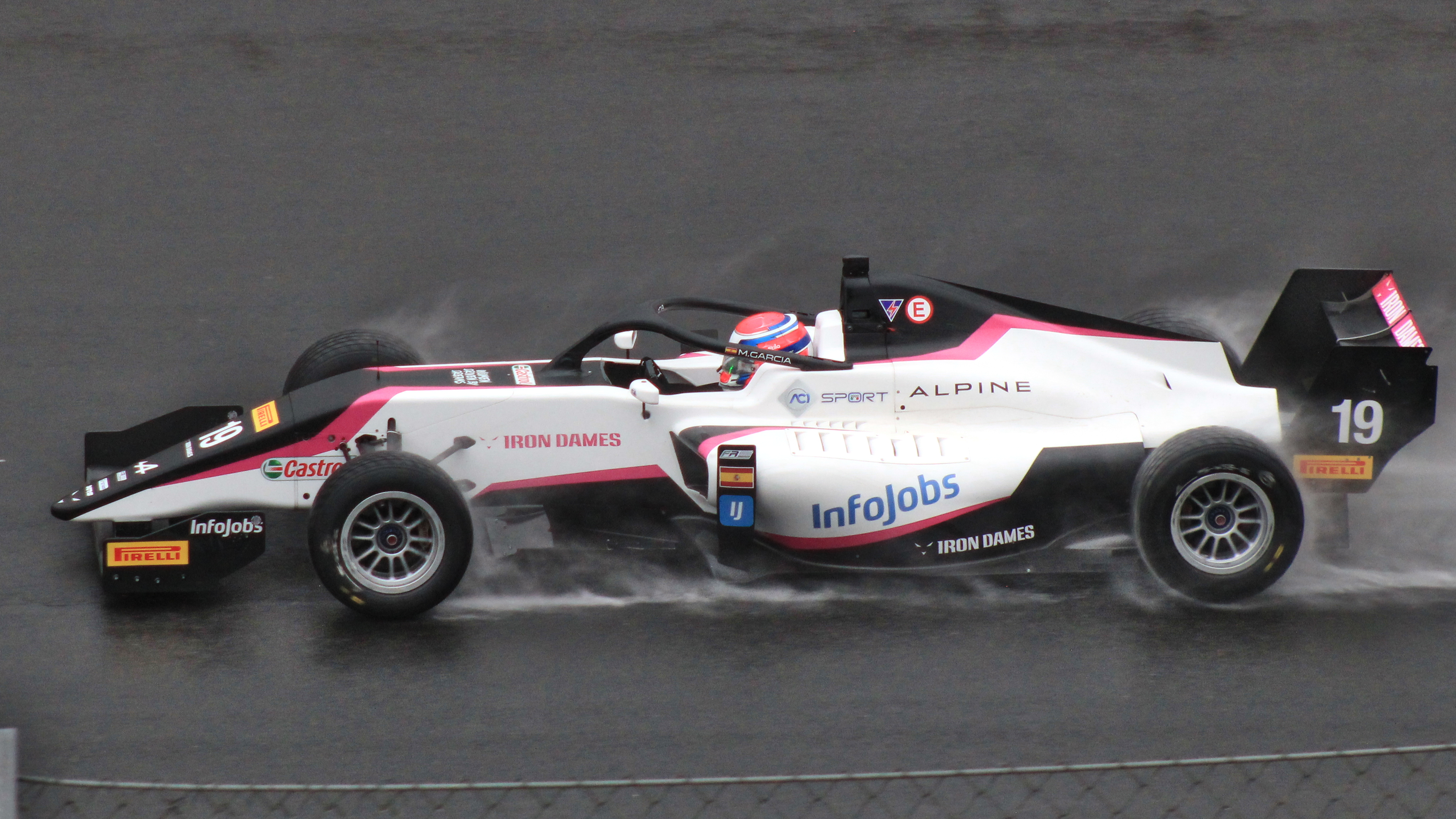
García driving in FRECA in 2024

Following García's success in F1 Academy, she received a fully-funded seat in the 2024 Formula Regional European Championship with Prema Racing. However, in April, she announced that she would switch to Iron Dames for the season to partner Mercedes junior Doriane Pin, as the Italian team made its debut in the series.

=== Formula E ===
García made her debut in Formula E machinery when she took part in the Berlin rookie test with the ERT Formula E Team in May 2024. In November of the same year, she took part in the 2024-25 pre-season women's test with Porsche Formula E Team. She placed eighth in the test.

García returned to the 2025-26 pre-season women's test in October 2025 with Lola Yamaha ABT.

=== GT racing ===
On August 19, 2024, the Iron Dames announced García would make her GT racing debut in the Ligier European Series. She finished second on track in race 1, but a penalty dropped her to fifth. She won the second race, and finished with the fastest lap in both races. In the season finale, she qualified third for both races. García was taken out in race 1 while battling for a podium position, but came away from race 2 with the victory.

== Karting record ==
=== Karting career summary ===
Season	Series	Team	Position
2010	Copa de Campeones — Alevín		NC
2011	WSK Master Series — 60 Mini	AV Racers	
2011	Spanish Championship — Alevín		8th
2011	Italian Championship — 60 Mini		40th
2011	WSK Final Cup — 60 Mini	AV Racers	NC
2011	Copa de Campeones — Alevín		3rd
2012	Spanish Championship — Cadet		10th
2012	WSK Final Cup — 60 Mini	Luxor Racing Team	4th
2012	Copa de Campeones — Cadete		17th
2013	42° Trofeo delle Industrie — KF3		34th
2013	Andrea Margutti Trophy — KFJ		NC
2013	WSK Master Series — KFJ	Garcia Pino	31st
2013	WSK Euro Series — KFJ	M2 Racing Karts	NC
2013	Spanish Championship — KF3		2nd
2013	CIK-FIA European Championship — KFJ	AV Racers Intnal	25th
2013	CIK-FIA World Championship — KFJ	Garcia, Francisco	NC
2013	CIK-FIA International Super Cup — KFJ	Garcia, Francisco	9th
2013	WSK Final Cup — KFJ	Garcia Pino	25th
2014	South Garda Winter Cup — KFJ		NC
2014	Rotax Max Wintercup — Rotax Max Junior		26th
2014	Rotax Euro Challenge — Junior		23rd
2014	Rotax International Open — Junior		10th
2014	WSK Champions Cup — KFJ	Zanardi Strakka Racing	21st
2014	WSK Super Master Series — KFJ	Zanardi Strakka Racing	38th
2014	Spanish Championship — KFJ		2nd
2014	CIK-FIA European Championship — KFJ	Zanardi Strakka Racing	NC
2014	CIK-FIA World Championship — KFJ	Garcia, Francisco	NC
2014	CIK-FIA Karting Academy Trophy		14th
2014	WSK Final Cup — KFJ	Garcia Francisco	23rd
2015	South Garda Winter Cup — KFJ		15th
2015	Rotax Max Wintercup — Rotax Max Junior		23rd
2015	42° Trofeo delle Industrie — KF3		1st
2015	Andrea Margutti Trophy — KFJ		14th
2015	WSK Super Master Series — KFJ	GARCIA FRANCISCO	10th
2015	WSK Gold Cup — KFJ	GARCIA FRANCISCO	14th
2015	Spanish Championship — Junior		5th
2015	CIK-FIA European Championship — KFJ	Garcia, Francisco	4th
2015	CIK-FIA World Championship — KFJ	Garcia, Francisco	13th
2015	CIK-FIA Karting Academy Trophy		1st
2015	WSK Final Cup — KFJ	GARCIA FRANCISCO	9th
2016	Rotax Max Wintercup — Rotax Max Senior		23rd
2016	WSK Super Master Series — KFJ	Evokart Srl	9th
2016	CIK-FIA European Championship — OK	Marquez, Vicente	4th
2016	CIK-FIA International Super Cup — KZ2	Evokart Srl	NC
2018	Spanish Championship — KZ2		5th
2018	CIK-FIA European Championship — KZ2	unomatricula k-team	NC

== Racing record ==
=== Racing career summary ===
Season	Series	Team	Races	Wins	Poles	F/Laps	Podiums	Points	Position
2016	F4 Spanish Championship	Drivex	11	0	0	0	0	0	NC†
2017	F4 Spanish Championship	MP Motorsport	20	0	0	0	0	70	9th
2017	SMP F4 Championship	MP Motorsport	3	0	0	0	0	8	17th
2019	W Series	Hitech GP	6	1	1	0	2	66	4th
2021	W Series	Puma W Series Team	7	0	0	0	1	21	12th
2022	W Series	CortDAO W Series Team	7	0	1	0	1	45	6th
2023	F1 Academy	Prema Racing	21	7	5	6	12	278	**1st**
2024	Formula Regional European Championship	Iron Dames	20	0	0	0	0	0	28th
2024	Ligier European Series - JS2 R	Iron Dames by M Racing	4	2	0	3	2	0	NC†
2025	Le Mans Cup - GT3	Iron Dames	7	1	1	1	2	63	4th
2026	Ligier European Series - JS P4	Petrogold	2	0	0	0	0	2	26th

^{†} As García was a guest driver, she was ineligible for points.

=== Complete F4 Spanish Championship results ===
(key) (Races in bold indicate pole position) (Races in italics indicate fastest lap)

Year	Team	1	2	3	4	5	6	7	8	9	10	11	12	13	14	15	16	17	18	19	20	Pos	Points
2016	Drivex	NAV; 1	NAV; 2	NAV; 3	ALC; 1	ALC; 2	ALC; 3	ALG; 1	ALG; 2	ALG; 3	VAL; 1; 5	VAL; 2; 5	VAL; 3; 6	CAT; 1; 5	CAT; 2; 6	JAR; 1; 8	JAR; 2; 8	JAR; 3; 7	JER; 1; 5	JER; 2; 7	JER; 3; 5	NC†	0
2017	MP Motorsport	ALC; 1; 10	ALC; 2; 6	ALC; 3; 6	NAV1; 1; 9	NAV1; 2; 12	NAV1; 3; 7	CAT; 1; 8	CAT; 2; 9	JER; 1; 6	JER; 2; 5	JER; 3; 13†	NAV2; 1; 7	NAV2; 2; 10	NAV2; 3; 6	NOG; 1; 8	NOG; 2; 10	NOG; 3; 7	EST; 1; 11	EST; 2; 9	EST; 3; 8	9th	70

^{†} As García was a guest driver, she was ineligible for points.

=== Complete SMP F4 Championship results ===
(key) (Races in bold indicate pole position) (Races in italics indicate fastest lap)

Year	Team	1	2	3	4	5	6	7	8	9	10	11	12	13	14	15	16	17	18	19	20	21	Pos	Points
2017	MP Motorsport	SOC; 1	SOC; 2	SOC; 3	SMO; 1	SMO; 2	SMO; 3	AHV; 1	AHV; 2	AHV; 3	AUD; 1	AUD; 2	AUD; 3	MSC1; 1; 17	MSC1; 2 Ret	MSC1; 3; 6	MSC2; 1	MSC2; 2	MSC2; 3	ASS; 1	ASS; 2	ASS; 3	17th	8

=== Complete W Series results ===
(key) (Races in bold indicate pole position) (Races in italics indicate fastest lap)

Year	Team	1	2	3	4	5	6	7	8	DC	Points
2019	Hitech GP	HOC; 3	ZOL; 4	MIS; 6	**NOR**; 1	ASS; 9	BRH; 8			4th	66
2021	Puma W Series Team	RBR1; Ret	RBR2; 12	SIL; 12	HUN; 7	SPA; 3	ZAN; 18	COA1; 15	COA2; DNS	12th	21
2022	CortDAO W Series Team	MIA1; 11	MIA2; 9	CAT; 6	SIL; 18	LEC; 6	HUN; 4	**SIN**; 3		6th	45

=== Complete F1 Academy results ===
(key) (Races in bold indicate pole position; races in italics indicate fastest lap)

Year	Team	1	2	3	4	5	6	7	8	9	10	11	12	13	14	15	16	17	18	19	20	21	DC	Points
2023	Prema Racing	**RBR**; **1**; 1	RBR; 2; 7	**RBR**; **3**; 1	CRT; 1; 6	CRT; 2; 5	**CRT**; **3**; 1	CAT; 1; 3	CAT; 2; 2	CAT; 3; 3	ZAN; 1 Ret	ZAN; 2; 2	ZAN; 3; 4	**MNZ**; **1**; 1	MNZ; 2; 6	MNZ; 3; 5	LEC; 1; 6	LEC; 2; 1	LEC; 3; 1	**COA**; **1**; 1	COA; 2 Ret	COA; 3; 3	1st	278

=== Complete Formula Regional European Championship results ===
(key) (Races in bold indicate pole position) (Races in italics indicate fastest lap)

Year	Team	1	2	3	4	5	6	7	8	9	10	11	12	13	14	15	16	17	18	19	20	DC	Points
2024	Iron Dames	HOC; 1; 24	HOC; 2; 25	SPA; 1; 21	SPA; 2; 15	ZAN; 1; 24	ZAN; 2; 22	HUN; 1; 20	HUN; 2 Ret	MUG; 1; 31	MUG; 2; 27	LEC; 1; 18	LEC; 2; 20	IMO; 1; 23	IMO; 2; 17	RBR; 1; 23	RBR; 2; 14	CAT; 1; 29	CAT; 2; 24	MNZ; 1; 20	MNZ; 2; 24	28th	0

=== Complete Le Mans Cup results ===
(key) (Races in bold indicate pole position) (Races in italics indicate the fastest lap)

Year	Entrant	Car	Class	1	2	3	4	5	6	7	DC	Points
2025	Iron Dames	Porsche 911 GT3 R (992)	GT3	BAR; Ret	LEC; 4	LMS; WD	LMS; WD	SPA; 3	**SIL**; 1	POR; 5	4th	63

=== Complete Ligier European Series results ===
(key) (Races in bold indicate pole position) (Races in italics indicate the fastest lap)

Year	Entrant	Car	Class	1	2	3	4	5	6	7	8	9	10	11	DC	Points
2024	Iron Dames by M Racing	Ligier JS2 R	JS2 R	CAT; 1	CAT; 2	LEC; 1	LEC; 2	LMS	SPA; 1; 5	SPA; 2; 1	MUG; 1	MUG; 2	POR; 1; 7	POR; 2; 1	NC†	0†
2026	Petrogold	Ligier JS P4	JS P4	BAR; 1	BAR; 2	LEC; 1	LEC; 2	LMS	SPA; 1 Ret	SPA; 2; 9	SIL; 1	SIL; 2	ALG; 1	ALG; 2	26th	2

^{†} As García was a guest driver, she was ineligible for points.

Sporting positions
Preceded by Inaugural	F1 Academy; Champion; 2023	Succeeded by Abbi Pulling
