= 2026 Ligier European Series =

Motor racing championship held in 2026

The 2026 Ligier European Series was the seventh season of the Ligier European Series. The six–event season began at Circuit de Barcelona-Catalunya on 10 April, and finished at Algarve International Circuit on 9 October.

Team Virage's No. 14 pairing of Alex Gardner and Simon Schranz won the JS P4 title on countback against the No. 6 ANS Motorsport crew of Ethan Pharamond and Mika Abrahams. The JS2 R class was dominated by the No. 41 VSF Sports entry of Antonin Bernard and Daniel Dallakyan, who clinched the title with three races to spare.

== Calendar ==
Round	Race	Circuit	Date	Map of circuit locations
1	Barcelona Heat	(Spain) Circuit de Barcelona-Catalunya	9–10 April	2026 Ligier European Series is located in Europe
2	Le Castellet Heat	(France) Circuit Paul Ricard	1–2 May	2026 Ligier European Series is located in Europe
3	Le Mans Heat	(France) Circuit de la Sarthe	7 June	2026 Ligier European Series is located in Europe
4	Spa–Francorchamps Heat	(Belgium) Circuit de Spa-Francorchamps	21–23 August	2026 Ligier European Series is located in Europe
5	Silverstone Heat	(United Kingdom) Silverstone Circuit	11–12 September	2026 Ligier European Series is located in Europe
6	Portimão Heat	(Portugal) Algarve International Circuit	8–9 October	2026 Ligier European Series is located in Europe

== Entries ==
=== JS P4 ===
All entries use the Ligier JS P4 and Michelin tyres.

Team	No.	Drivers	Rounds
(Poland) Team Virage	1	(Italy) Sebastien Kawpeng (Note: Kawpeng is a Filipino driver racing under an Italian licence.)	All
(Poland) Team Virage	1	(Republic of Ireland) Brandon McCaughan	All
(Poland) Team Virage	14	(Australia) Alex Gardner	All
(Poland) Team Virage	14	(Austria) Simon Schranz	All
(Poland) Team Virage	99	(France) Arnaud Malizia	All
(Poland) Team Virage	99	(Denmark) Marius Kristiansen	1
(Poland) Team Virage	99	(France) Victor Aegerter	2–5
(Poland) Team Virage	99	(United States) Luke Kendall	6
(France) ANS Motorsport	6	(South Africa) Mika Abrahams	All
(France) ANS Motorsport	6	(France) Ethan Pharamond	All
(France) ANS Motorsport	9	(France) Arthur Aegerter	All
(France) ANS Motorsport	9	(France) Adrien Bastide	1–3, 5–6
(Italy) LR Motorsport	7	(Italy) Pietro Ferri	All
(Italy) LR Motorsport	7	(Italy) Simone Riccitelli	1–5
(Spain) ASM Motorsport	12	(Mexico) Luis Carlos Perez Cabello	All
(Spain) ASM Motorsport	12	(Netherlands) Sacha Van't Pad Bosch	1–3
(Spain) ASM Motorsport	12	(Portugal) Henrique Oliveira	4–6
(Spain) ASM Motorsport	44	(Portugal) Henrique Oliveira	2
(Spain) ASM Motorsport	44	(Czech Republic) Dan Skočdopole	2
(Spain) ASM Motorsport	44	(Brazil) Lucas Fecury	3
(Spain) ASM Motorsport	44	(Netherlands) Sacha Van't Pad Bosch	5–6
(France) Trajectus Motorsport	19	(France) Vincent Bouteiller	All
(France) Trajectus Motorsport	19	(France) Tomas Pompidou	All
(France) Trajectus Motorsport	20	(United Kingdom) Gabriel Doyle-Parfait	All
(France) Trajectus Motorsport	20	(United Kingdom) Nickolas Ellis	All
(Spain) Petrogold	33	(United Kingdom) Scott Marsh	All
(Spain) Petrogold	33	(Spain) Jan Duran Olive	1–2
(Spain) Petrogold	33	(Spain) Daniel Nogales	3, 5
(Spain) Petrogold	33	(Spain) Marta García	4
(Spain) Petrogold	93	(Romania) Andrei Duna	All
(Spain) Petrogold	93	(Mexico) Christian Garduño	All
(Sweden) Allay Racing	48	(Sweden) Emil Hellberg	3–6
(Sweden) Allay Racing	48	(Sweden) Linus Hellberg	4
(France) Les Deux Arbres	50	(France) Jeremy Loisel	1, 3–4, 6
(France) Les Deux Arbres	50	(France) Benjamin Fournier	1
(France) Les Deux Arbres	50	(Switzerland) Pascal Tichit	6
(France) M Racing	57	(Denmark) August Therbo	All
(France) M Racing	57	(France) Cindy Gudet	1
(France) M Racing	57	(France) Martin Lacquemanne	2–3
(Czech Republic) Bretton Racing	69	(Czech Republic) Dan Skočdopole	1
(Czech Republic) Bretton Racing	69	(United States) Dominique Bastien	2–6
(Czech Republic) Bretton Racing	69	(Denmark) Marius Kristiansen	2, 4–6

=== JS2 R ===
All entries use the Ligier JS2 R and Michelin tyres.

Team	No.	Drivers	Rounds
(Italy) LR Motorsport	3	(Italy) Andrea Frizza	All
(Italy) LR Motorsport	3	(United States) Noah Rosser	All
(Italy) LR Motorsport	81	(Italy) Simone Bianco	All
(France) ANS Motorsport	4	(France) Louis Iglesias	3
(France) ANS Motorsport	4	(France) Jean Philippe Jouvent	3
(France) LADC Motorsport	10	(Germany) Christian Gisy	3
(France) LADC Motorsport	61	(France) Erwan Bihel	3
(France) LADC Motorsport	90	(France) Clément Loeul	3
(France) LADC by Racing Spirit of Léman	62	(Denmark) Oskar Kristensen	3
(France) VSF Sports	18	(France) Maxime Aparicio	All
(France) VSF Sports	18	(France) Anthony Ghibaudo	All
(France) VSF Sports	41	(France) Antonin Bernard	All
(France) VSF Sports	41	(Spain) Daniel Dallakyan	All
(France) Zosh Competition	22	(France) Guillaume Brichard	3
(France) Zosh Competition	22	(France) Michel Renavand	3
(France) Zosh Competition	23	(France) Gilles Bouvart	3
(France) Zosh Competition	51	(France) Paul Alberto	3
(France) Zosh Competition	51	(France) Maxence Chatellier	3
(France) Zosh Competition	72	(France) Anthony Perrin	3
(France) Zosh Competition	72	(France) Léo Pinquier	3
(France) Pegasus Racing	28	(France) Christophe Weber	3–4
(France) Pegasus Racing	29	(France) Jordan Meyer	1, 3–4
(France) Pegasus Racing	29	(Lithuania) Kasparas Vingilis	1, 3–4
(France) Pegasus Racing	94	(France) David Caussanel	1
(France) Pegasus Racing	94	(France) Alain Meyer	1, 3–4
(France) Pegasus Racing	94	(France) Jordan Meyer	2
(France) Pegasus Racing	94	(Lithuania) Kasparas Vingilis	2
(France) Pegasus Racing	94	(France) Julien Schell	4
(Portugal) Veloso Motorsport	35	(Portugal) José Marreiros	1–5
(Portugal) Veloso Motorsport	35	(Portugal) Pedro Marreiros	1–5
(France) M Racing	53	(France) Nathan Bihel	3
(France) M Racing	68	(Belgium) Lawrence Herbots	All
(France) M Racing	68	(France) Nathan Huet	1
(France) M Racing	75	(France) Cindy Gudet	2–4
(France) M Racing	75	(France) Nathan Huet	2–4
(France) Trajectus Motorsport	83	(France) Charles Lambert	All
(France) Trajectus Motorsport	84	(Belgium) Jack Tabery	All
(France) Trajectus Motorsport	84	(Belgium) Martin Tabery	All
(France) 23Events Racing	88	(Denmark) Marcus Terkildsen	1, 3–6

== Results ==
Bold indicates overall winner.

Round		Circuit	JS P4 Winners	JS2 R Winners
1	R1	(Spain) Circuit de Barcelona–Catalunya	(France) **No. 19 Trajectus Motorsport**	(France) No. 88 23Events Racing
1	R1	(Spain) Circuit de Barcelona–Catalunya	(France) **Vincent Bouteiller** (France) **Tomas Pompidou**	(Denmark) Marcus Terkildsen
1	R2	(Spain) Circuit de Barcelona–Catalunya	**(Poland) No. 14 Team Virage**	(France) No. 41 VSF Sports
1	R2	(Spain) Circuit de Barcelona–Catalunya	**(Australia) Alex Gardner** **(Austria) Simon Schranz**	(France) Antonin Bernard (Spain) Daniel Dallakyan
2	R1	(France) Circuit Paul Ricard	**(France) No. 6 ANS Motorsport**	(France) No. 41 VSF Sports
2	R1	(France) Circuit Paul Ricard	**(South Africa) Mika Abrahams** **(France) Ethan Pharamond**	(France) Antonin Bernard (Spain) Daniel Dallakyan
2	R2	(France) Circuit Paul Ricard	**(Italy) No. 7 LR Motorsport**	(Italy) No. 81 LR Motorsport
2	R2	(France) Circuit Paul Ricard	**(Italy) Pietro Ferri** **(Italy) Simone Riccitelli**	(Italy) Simone Bianco
3	R	(France) Circuit de la Sarthe	**(France) No. 6 ANS Motorsport**	(France) No. 62 LADC By RSL
3	R	(France) Circuit de la Sarthe	**(South Africa) Mika Abrahams** **(France) Ethan Pharamond**	(Denmark) Oskar Kristensen
4	R1	(Belgium) Circuit de Spa–Francorchamps	**(Poland) No. 14 Team Virage**	(France) No. 29 Pegasus Racing
4	R1	(Belgium) Circuit de Spa–Francorchamps	**(Australia) Alex Gardner** **(Austria) Simon Schranz**	(France) Jordan Meyer (Lithuania) Kasparas Vingilis
4	R2	(Belgium) Circuit de Spa–Francorchamps	**(Poland) No. 1 Team Virage**	(France) No. 41 VSF Sports
4	R2	(Belgium) Circuit de Spa–Francorchamps	**(Italy) Sebastien Kawpeng** **(Republic of Ireland) Brandon McCaughan**	(France) Antonin Bernard (Spain) Daniel Dallakyan
5	R1	(United Kingdom) Silverstone Circuit	**(France) No. 6 ANS Motorsport**	(France) No. 41 VSF Sports
5	R1	(United Kingdom) Silverstone Circuit	**(South Africa) Mika Abrahams** **(France) Ethan Pharamond**	(France) Antonin Bernard (Spain) Daniel Dallakyan
5	R2	(United Kingdom) Silverstone Circuit	**(Poland) No. 14 Team Virage**	(France) No. 41 VSF Sports
5	R2	(United Kingdom) Silverstone Circuit	**(Australia) Alex Gardner** **(Austria) Simon Schranz**	(France) Antonin Bernard (Spain) Daniel Dallakyan
6	R1	(Portugal) Algarve International Circuit	**(France) No. 57 M Racing**	(France) No. 18 VSF Sports
6	R1	(Portugal) Algarve International Circuit	**(Denmark) August Therbo**	(France) Maxime Aparicio (France) Anthony Ghibaudo
6	R2	(Portugal) Algarve International Circuit	**(France) No. 57 M Racing**	(France) No. 41 VSF Sports
6	R2	(Portugal) Algarve International Circuit	**(Denmark) August Therbo**	(France) Antonin Bernard (Spain) Daniel Dallakyan

== Championship standings ==
=== JS P4 Drivers ===
Pos.	Driver	Team	BAR (Spain)		LEC (France)		LMS (France)	SPA (Belgium)		SIL (United Kingdom)		ALG (Portugal)		Points
1	(Australia) Alex Gardner (Austria) Simon Schranz	(Poland) Team Virage	7	1	4	2	2	1	5	5	1	10	3	165
2	(South Africa) Mika Abrahams (France) Ethan Pharamond	(France) ANS Motorsport	3	3	**1**	8	1	**6**	2	1	**6**	4	5	165
3	(Denmark) August Therbo	(France) M Racing	11	6	3	4	4	2	4	3	2	1	**1**	160
4	(Italy) Pietro Ferri	(Italy) LR Motorsport	6	2	2	**1**	**3**	Ret	14	10	13	**Ret**	2	103
5	(France) Tomas Pompidou	(France) Trajectus Motorsport	**1**	**4**	6	14	Ret	4	3	2	11	5	12	101
6	(France) Vincent Bouteiller	(France) Trajectus Motorsport	**1**	**4**	6	14	Ret	4	3	2	11 (Note: Boutellier did not fulfil his mandated minimum drive time during race 2 of the Silverstone round, meaning that he did not receive points for that event.)	5	12	100
7	(Italy) Sebastien Kawpeng (Republic of Ireland) Brandon McCaughan	(Poland) Team Virage	8	5	5	10	11	3	**1**	**4**	5	7	7	99
8	(Italy) Simone Riccitelli	(Italy) LR Motorsport	6	2	2	**1**	**3**	Ret	14	10	13			85
9	(United Kingdom) Gabriel Doyle-Parfait (United Kingdom) Nickolas Ellis	(France) Trajectus Motorsport	Ret	9	7	5	7	5	7	7	12	2	6	72
10	(Mexico) Luis Carlos Pérez Cabello	(Spain) ASM Motorsport	2	9	8	8	6	Ret	6	8	3	8	8	66
11	(Netherlands) Sacha Van't Pad Bosch	(Spain) ASM Motorsport	2	9	8	8				6	7	6	4	57
12	(Portugal) Henrique Oliveira	(Spain) ASM Motorsport	4	11	10	12		Ret	6	8	3	8	8	48
13	(United Kingdom) Scott Marsh	(Spain) Petrogold	5	Ret	Ret	3	Ret	Ret	9	12	Ret	3	10	43
14	(France) Martin Lacquemanne	(France) M Racing			3	4	4							39
15	(Romania) Andrei Duna (Mexico) Christian Garduño	(Spain) Petrogold	10	8	Ret	7	8	7	11	Ret	4	13	11	33
16	(France) Arnaud Malizia	(Poland) Team Virage	9	7	8	6	Ret	9	8	9	Ret	Ret	9	32
17	(Spain) Jan Duran Olive	(Spain) Petrogold	5	Ret	Ret	3								25
18	(France) Victor Aegerter	(Poland) Team Virage			8	6	Ret	9	8	9	Ret			22
19	(France) Arthur Aegerter	(France) ANS Motorsport	13	12	11	11	5	10	13	13	9	9	14	16
20	(France) Adrien Bastide	(France) ANS Motorsport	13	12	11	11	5			13	9	9	14	14
21	(Czech Republic) Dan Skočdopole	(Czech Republic) Bretton Racing	4	11										13
21	(Czech Republic) Dan Skočdopole	(Spain) ASM Motorsport			10	12								13
22	(Denmark) Marius Kristiansen	(Poland) Team Virage	9	7										13
22	(Denmark) Marius Kristiansen	(Czech Republic) Bretton Racing			12	13		12	10	14	8	12	13	13
23	(France) Cindy Gudet	(France) M Racing	11	6										8
24	(United States) Dominique Bastien	(Czech Republic) Bretton Racing			12	13	10	12	10	14	8	12	13	6
25	(France) Jeremy Loisel	(France) Les Deux Arbres	12	Ret			9	11	15			14	16	3
26	(Spain) Marta García	(Spain) Petrogold						Ret	9					2
27	(United States) Luke Kendall	(Poland) Team Virage										Ret	9	2
28	(Spain) Daniel Nogales	(Spain) Petrogold					Ret			12	Ret			0
29	(Switzerland) Pascal Tichit	(France) Les Deux Arbres										14	16	0
30	(Brazil) Lucas Fecury	(Spain) ASM Motorsport					Ret							0
Pos.	Driver	Team	BAR (Spain)		LEC (France)		LMS (France)	SPA (Belgium)		SIL (United Kingdom)		ALG (Portugal)		Points

Colour	Result
Gold	Winner
Silver	Second place
Bronze	Third place
Green	Points classification
Blue	Non-points classification
Blue	Non-classified finish (NC)
Purple	Retired, not classified (Ret)
Red	Did not qualify (DNQ)
Red	Did not pre-qualify (DNPQ)
Black	Disqualified (DSQ)
White	Did not start (DNS)
White	Withdrew (WD)
White	Race cancelled (C)
Blank	Did not practice (DNP)
Blank	Did not arrive (DNA)
Blank	Excluded (EX)

**Bold** – Pole

Italics – Fastest Lap

† — Did not finish, but classified

=== JS2 R Drivers ===
Pos.	Driver	Team	BAR (Spain)		LEC (France)		LMS (France)	SPA (Belgium)		SIL (United Kingdom)		ALG (Portugal)		Points
1	(France) Antonin Bernard (Spain) Daniel Dallakyan	(France) VSF Sports	4	1	1	2	Ret	**2**	1	1	1	7	1	211
2	(France) Maxime Aparicio (France) Anthony Ghibaudo	(France) VSF Sports	3	Ret	4	3	4	9	Ret	7	2	1	2	137
3	(Denmark) Marcus Terkildsen	(France) 23Events Racing	**1**	**2**	**Ret**	**Ret**	**Ret**	Ret	**3**	3	3	2	**5**	119
4	(Italy) Simone Bianco	(Italy) LR Motorsport	5	4	3	1	Ret	DSQ	Ret	**2**	**6**	3	3	118
5	(Belgium) Lawrence Herbots	(France) M Racing	11	5	5	Ret	17	4	4	6	4	4	4	108
6	(United States) Noah Rosser	(Italy) LR Motorsport	6	7	2	4	6	Ret	8	4	5	6	7	105
7	(Belgium) Martin Tabery	(France) Trajectus Motorsport	7	3	6	6	9	6	5	8	7	5	6	101
8	(Italy) Andrea Frizza	(Italy) LR Motorsport	6	7	2	4	6	Ret	8	4	5	6	7	95
9	(Belgium) Jack Tabery	(France) Trajectus Motorsport	7	3	6	6	9	6	5	8	7	5	6	95
10	(France) Charles Lambert	(France) Trajectus Motorsport	2	Ret	10	Ret	2	3	DSQ	5	Ret	**Ret**	Ret	75
11	(Portugal) José Merreiros	(Portugal) Veloso Motorsport	9	6	8	8	Ret							26
12	(Portugal) Pedro Merreiros	(Portugal) Veloso Motorsport	9	6	8	8								26
13	(France) Nathan Huet	(France) M Racing	11	5	9	7	8	5	7					12
Pos.	Driver	Team	BAR (Spain)		LEC (France)		LMS (France)	SPA (Belgium)		SIL (United Kingdom)		ALG (Portugal)		Points
