= Circuit Paul Ricard =

French race track

- All layouts of Circuit Paul Ricard after 2019 pitlane extension
- Location: Le Castellet, Var, France
- Coordinates: 43°15′2″N 5°47′30″E
- Capacity: 90,000
- FIA Grade: 1 (5 layouts)
- Broke ground: June 1969; 57 years ago
- Opened: 19 April 1970; 56 years ago
- Major events: Current: ELMS 4 Hours of Le Castlelet (2010–present); GT World Challenge Europe; 3 Hours of Paul Ricard (2012–present); FIM EWC Bol d'Or (1978–1999, 2015–2019, 2021–present); Asian Le Mans Series (2026); TCR World Tour (2026); TCR Europe (2018, 2020–2023, 2026); Ferrari Challenge Europe (2006–2010, 2015, 2017, 2022, 2024, 2026); FFSA GT (1997, 2009, 2011–2015, 2017–present); Former: Formula One; French Grand Prix (Intermittently 1971–1990, 2018–2019, 2021–2022); FIA Motorsport Games (2022); WTCC Race of France (2014–2016); Grand Prix motorcycle racing French motorcycle Grand Prix (Intermittently, 1973–1999); FIA GT (2006, 2009)
- Website: https://www.circuitpaulricard.com

Current layout with Mistral chicane (1C-V2) (2005–present)
- Length: 5.842 km (3.630 mi)
- Turns: 15
- Race lap record: 1:32.740 ( (Germany) Sebastian Vettel, Ferrari SF90, 2019, F1)

Current layout without Mistral chicane (1A-V2) (2005–present)
- Length: 5.770 km (3.585 mi)
- Turns: 13
- Race lap record: 1:40.139 ( (Netherlands) Nyck de Vries, Aurus 01, 2020, LMP2)

Short Circuit with Mistral chicane (3C) (2002–present)
- Length: 3.841 km (2.387 mi)
- Turns: 11
- Race lap record: 1:18.347 ( (Japan) Kimiya Sato, Lola B05/52, 2014, Auto GP)

Short Grand Prix Circuit (1986–2001)
- Length: 3.812 km (2.369 mi)
- Turns: 9
- Race lap record: 1:08.012 ( (United Kingdom) Nigel Mansell, Ferrari 641, 1990, F1)

Original Grand Prix Circuit (1970–2001)
- Length: 5.809 km (3.610 mi)
- Turns: 14
- Race lap record: 1:39.914 ( (Finland) Keke Rosberg, Williams FW10, 1985, F1)

Original National Circuit (1970–2001)
- Length: 3.263 km (2.028 mi)
- Turns: 9
- Race lap record: 1:15.800 ( (France) Jean-Pierre Jabouille, Alpine A441, 1974, Group 5)

The Circuit Paul Ricard (French pronunciation: [siʁkɥi pɔl ʁikaʁ]) is a French motorsport race track located in Le Castellet, Var, near Marseille. It was built in 1969 with finance from pastis magnate Paul Ricard, who wanted to experience the challenge of building a racetrack. The circuit hosted the Formula One French Grand Prix intermittently from 1971 to 2022, and the French motorcycle Grand Prix intermittently from 1973 to 1999. It currently hosts the Bol d'Or motorcycle race since 2015, and rounds of the European Le Mans Series and GT World Challenge Europe Endurance Cup.

== History ==
=== First years (1970–1990) ===
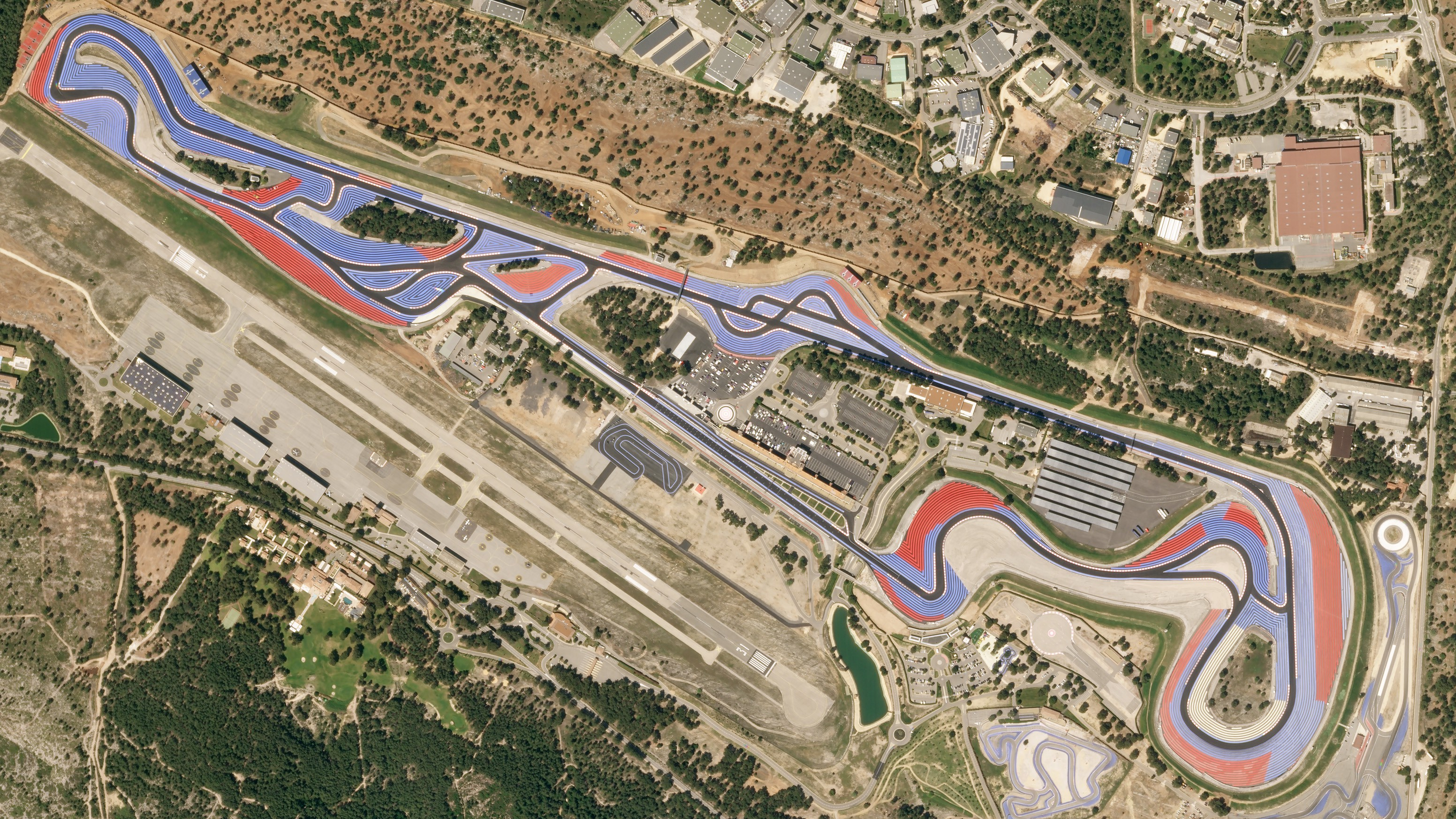
Satellite view of the circuit in April 2018

Opened on 19 April 1970, the circuit's innovative facilities made it one of the safest motor racing circuits in the world at the time of its opening. The circuit had three track layout permutations, a large industrial park and an airstrip. The combination of modern facilities, mild winter weather and an airstrip made it popular amongst racing teams for car testing during the annual winter off-season.

The original track was dominated by the 1.8 km (1.1 mi) long Mistral Straight that is followed by the high-speed right hand Signes corner. The long main straight and other fast sections made the track very hard on engines as they ran at full revs for extended spells. Engine failures were common, such as Ayrton Senna's huge crash during the 1985 French Grand Prix after the Renault engine in his Lotus failed and he went off backwards at Signes on his own oil and crashed heavily, with only light bruising to the driver. Nigel Mansell crashed at the same place in the same weekend during practice and suffered a concussion which kept him out of the race. Mansell's crash was the result of a slow puncture in his left rear tyre causing it to explode at over 320 km/h (200 mph), which detached his Williams FW10's rear wing. The Honda powered FW10 holds the race lap record for the original circuit when Mansell's teammate Keke Rosberg recorded a time of 1:39.914 during the 1985 French Grand Prix. During qualifying for the 1985 race, Swiss driver Marc Surer clocked what was at the time the highest speed recorded by a Formula One car on the Mistral when he pushed his turbocharged, 1,000 bhp (746 kW; 1,014 PS) Brabham-BMW to 335 km/h (208 mph). This compared to the slowest car in the race, the 550 bhp (410 kW; 558 PS) naturally aspirated Tyrrell-Ford V8 of Stefan Bellof which could only manage 277 km/h (172 mph). Bellof qualified 9 seconds slower than Surer and 12 seconds slower than pole winner Rosberg.

Paul Ricard was inaugurated with a 2-litre sports car race; during the 1970s and the 1980s the track developed some of the best French drivers of the time including four time World Drivers' Champion Alain Prost who won the French Grand Prix at the circuit in 1983, 1988, 1989 and 1990. The circuit hosted the Formula One French Grand Prix on many occasions, the first of which was the 1971 French Grand Prix.

The circuit was also extensively used for testing, especially in Formula One. In 1986, Brabham Formula One driver Elio de Angelis was killed in a testing accident at the fast first turn after the rear wing of his Brabham BT55 had broken off. Although the circuit was not the cause of the crash, it was modified in order to make it safer. The length of the Mistral Straight was reduced from 1.8 km (1.1 mi) in length to just over 1.0 km (0.62 mi), and the fast sweeping Verrerie curves where de Angelis had crashed were bypassed. Effectively, after the start, instead of heading into the left hand Verrerie sweeper, cars now braked hard and turned sharp right into a short run that connected the pit straight to the Mistral. This changed the circuit length for a Grand Prix from 5.809 km (3.610 mi) to just 3.812 km (2.369 mi). This also had the effect of cutting lap times from Keke Rosberg's 1985 pole time of 1:32.462 in his Williams-Honda turbo, to Nigel Mansell's 1990 pole time of 1:04.402 in his V12 Ferrari.

From 1990 the French Grand Prix was moved to Magny-Cours where it ran until 2008. Paul Ricard hosted the French Grand Prix on 14 occasions between 1971 and 1990. The Long Circuit was used from 1971 to 1985, with the Club Circuit used from 1986 to 1990. On six occasions (1971, 1975, 1976, 1978, 1980 and 1989) the winner at Paul Ricard went on to win the World Championship in the same year. Ronnie Peterson (1973 and 1974) and René Arnoux (1982) are the only Ricard winners who never won the championship.

=== Recent times (1990–present) ===
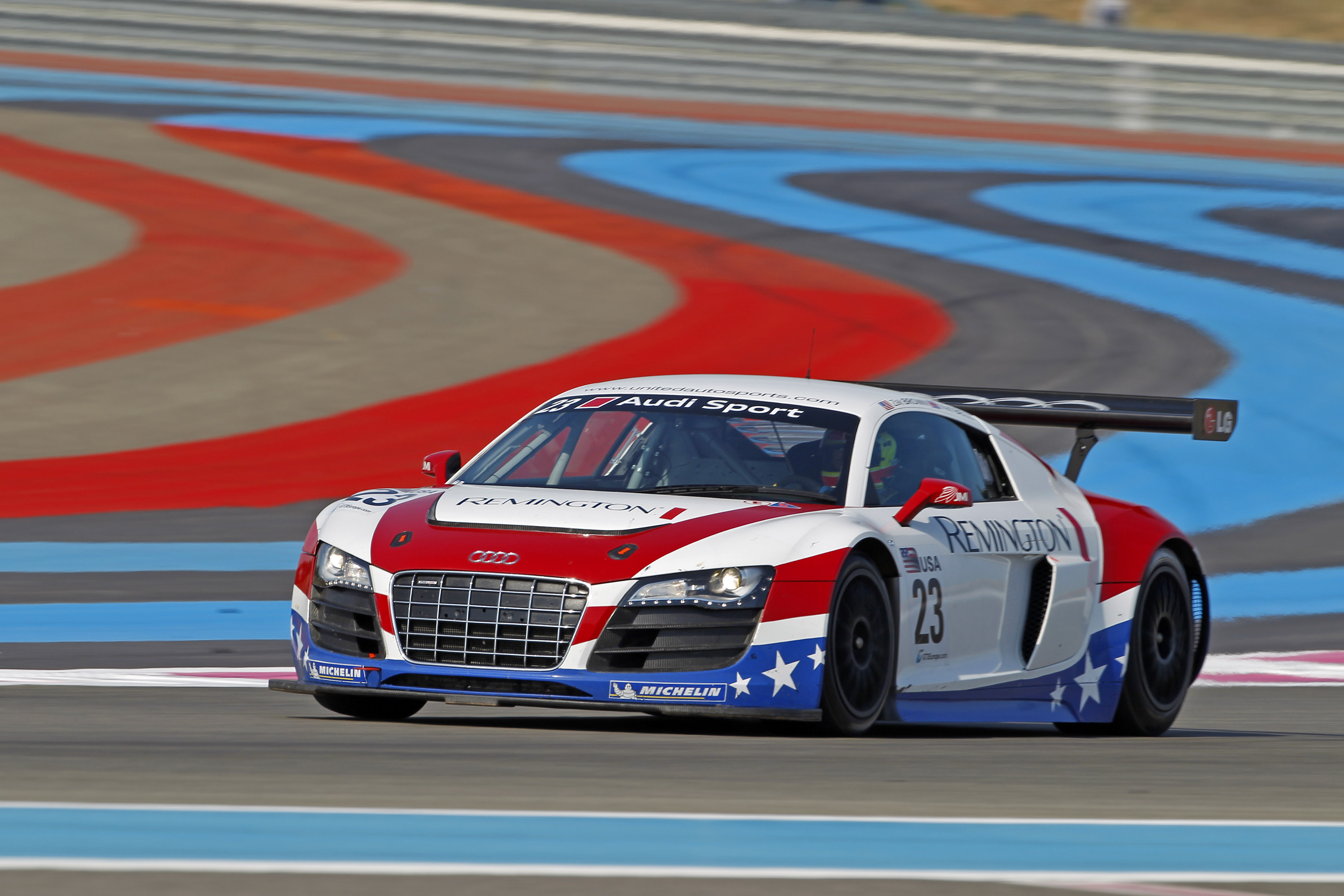
United Autosports Audi at the 2010 FIA GT3 European Championship Paul Ricard round

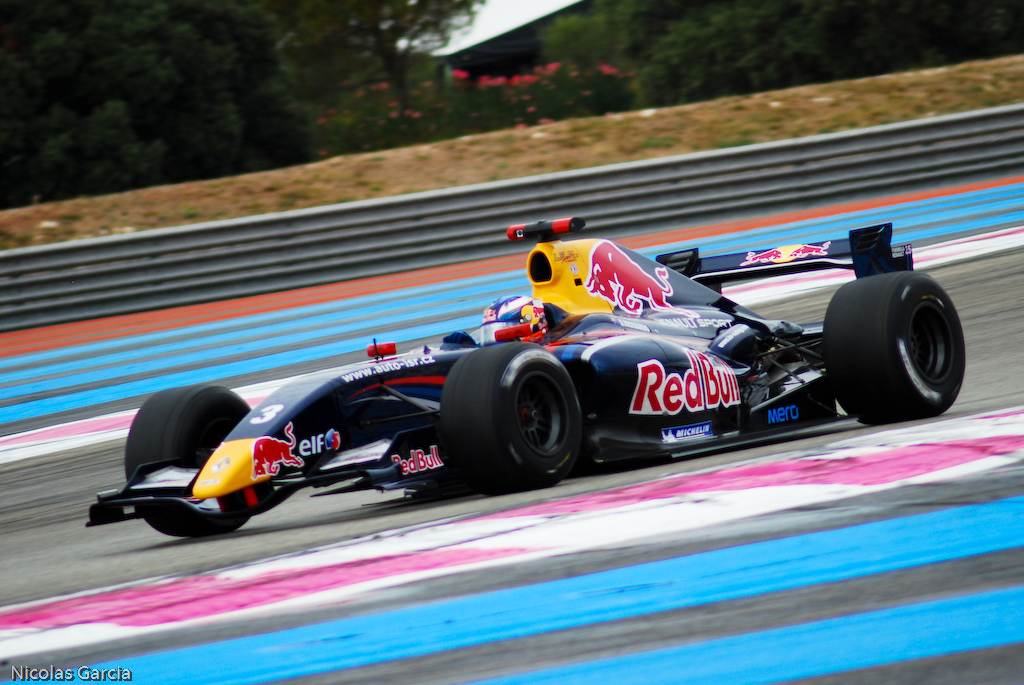
Daniel Ricciardo at Paul Ricard during the 2011 Formula Renault 3.5 Series Paul Ricard round

In the 1990s the circuit's use was limited to motorcycle racing and French national racing, most notably until 1999, the Bol d'or 24-hour motorcycle endurance race. The track was also the home of the Oreca F3000 team. After Ricard's death, the track was sold to Excelis, a company owned by Formula One promoter Bernie Ecclestone, in 1999. The track was rebuilt into an advanced test track, and was for a time known as the Paul Ricard High Tech Test Track (Paul Ricard HTTT) before changing its name back to Circuit Paul Ricard.

An aircraft landing strip suitable for private jets is amongst the circuit's facilities. There is a Karting Test Track (KTT) that features the same type of abrasive safety zones as the car track. The track has also hosted some races, including the 2006 Paul Ricard 500km, a round of the FIA GT Championship. Other GT championships have run races here, most notably the Ferrari Challenge and races organized by Porsche clubs of France and Italy.

On 5 December 2016, it was announced that the French Grand Prix would return to the Formula 1 calendar for the 2018 season at Paul Ricard. It was the first French Grand Prix since 2008 (last held at Magny-Cours) and the first at Circuit Paul Ricard since 1990. On 19 June 2017, the FIA's World Motor Sport Council in Geneva published its 2018 provisional calendar with the French Grand Prix scheduled for 24 June at Circuit Paul Ricard with the race itself followed immediately by the Austrian Grand Prix at the Red Bull Ring and then the British Grand Prix at Silverstone Circuit. Pirelli Motorsport has planned for a two-day tyre testing for its 2018 Formula 1 tyres at Circuit Paul Ricard in the months of May, June and September 2017. The track remained on the F1 calendar until the 2022 season, after which it disappeared from the calendar again.

Paul Ricard has the 3-star FIA Environmental Accreditation. In a 2021 report, it was ranked the second most sustainable racetrack in the world, together with Circuit de Barcelona-Catalunya and behind Mugello Circuit.

== Track ==
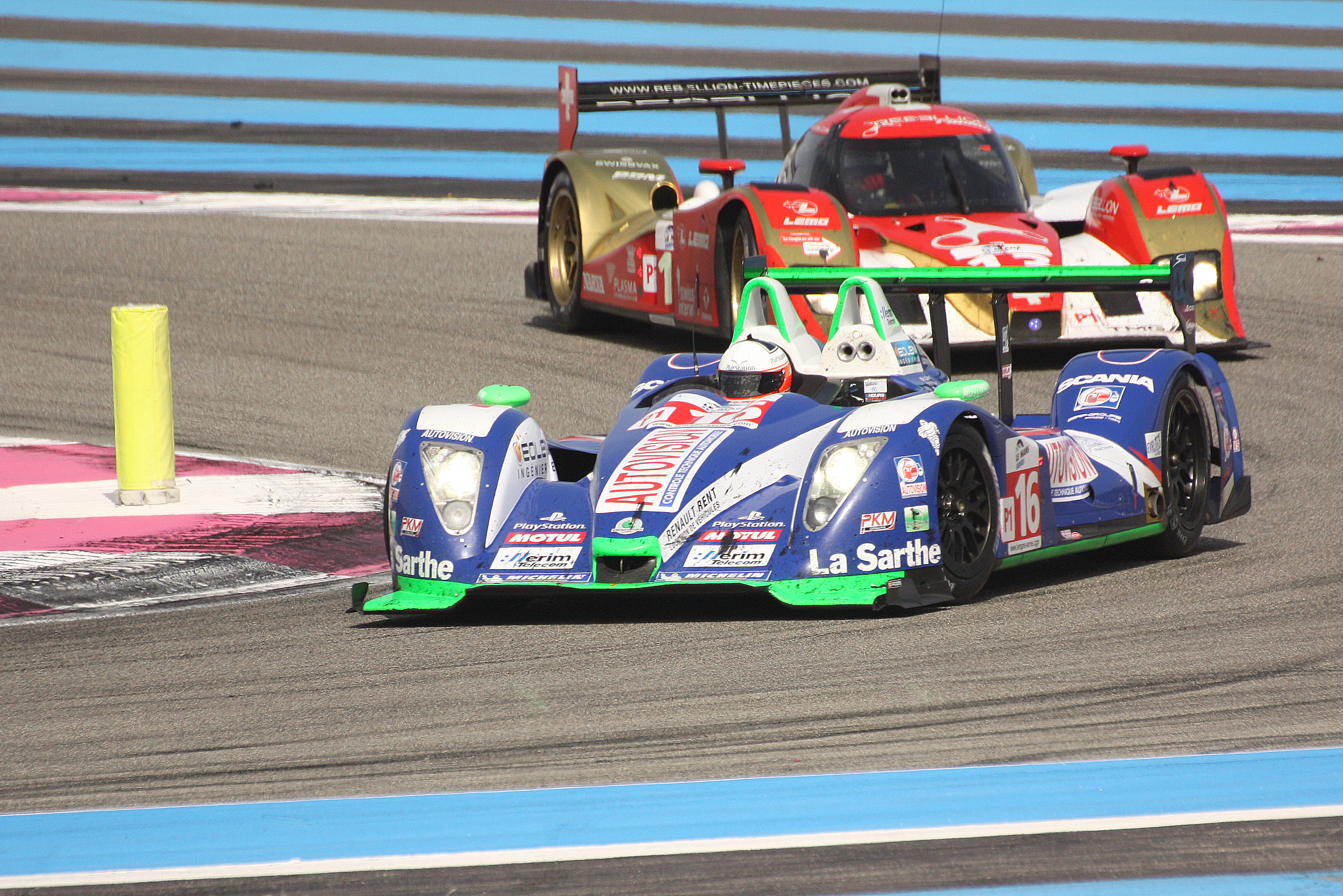
2011 edition of the 6 Hours of Castellet

The track is characterised by its 1.8 km (1.1 mi) long Mistral straight and elongated track design. The track is also unusual in that it is built on a plateau: it is very flat. In 1986 the track was modified to shorten the circuit, by adding shortcut through to the middle of the Mistral Straight. This shorter circuit was also known as the GP short circuit and was 3.812 km (2.369 mi) long. After the modifications in 2000–2005, the track offers 247 possible configurations from 0.828 km (0.514 mi) to the full 5.858 km (3.640 mi). The track's elevation ranges from 408 to 441 m (1,339 to 1,447 ft) above sea level. Its flexibility and mild winter weather mean that it is used for testing by several motorsport teams, including Formula One teams.

The track is known for its distinctive black and blue run-off areas known as the Blue Zone. The runoff surface consists of a mixture of asphalt and tungsten, used instead of gravel traps, as common at other circuits. A second, deeper run-off area is the Red Zone, with a more abrasive surface designed to maximize tyre grip and hence minimize braking distance, although at the cost of extreme tyre wear. The final safeguard consists of Tecpro barriers, a modern improvement on tyre barriers.

In 2019 the pitlane entry was moved following safety concerns. The entry, which was previously accessed via the main straight, is now situated between the final two corners (turns 14 and 15).

=== Track configurations ===
Circuit Paul Ricard Layout History and Configurations
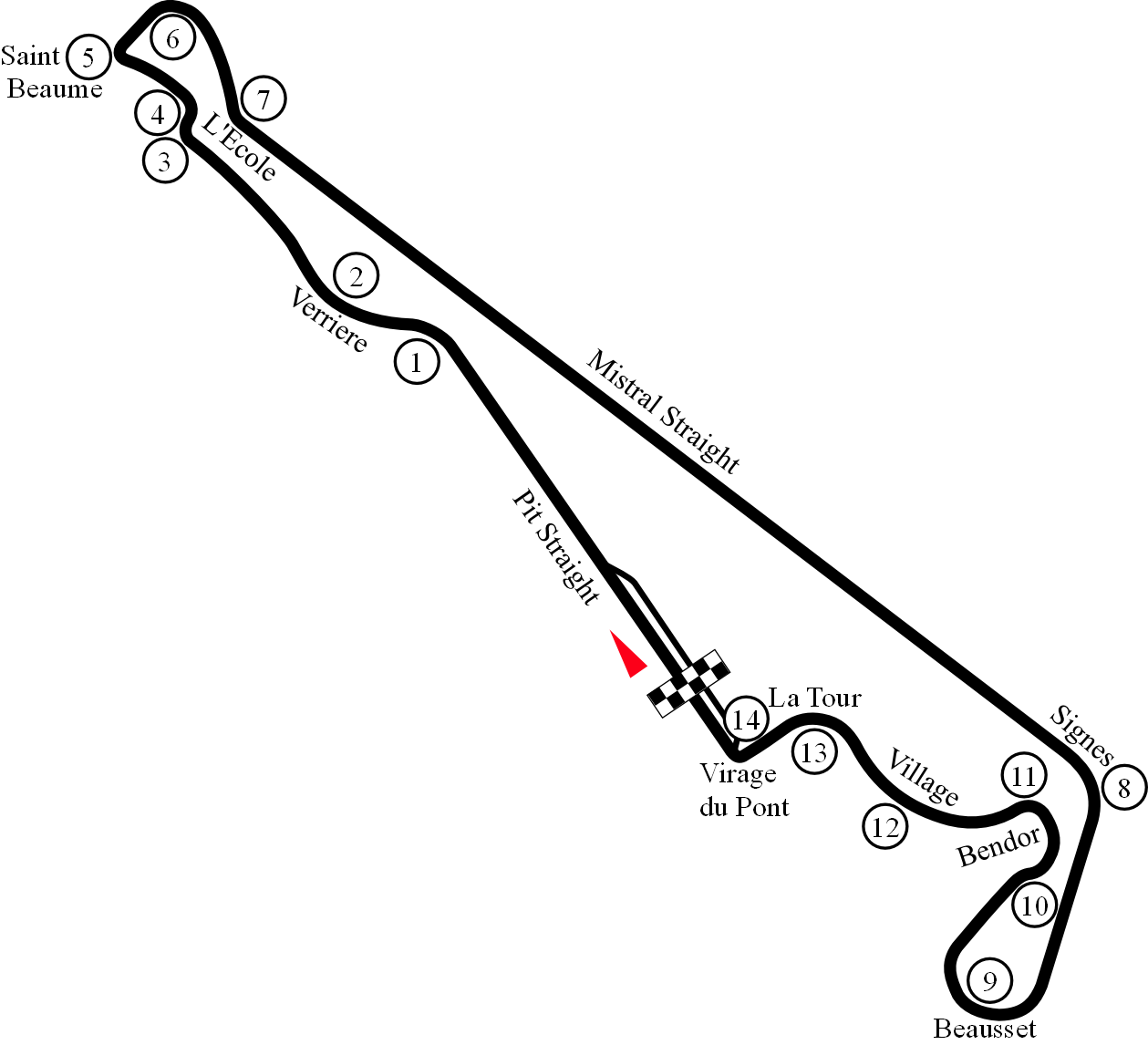
Paul Ricard Original Grand Prix Circuit (1970–2001)

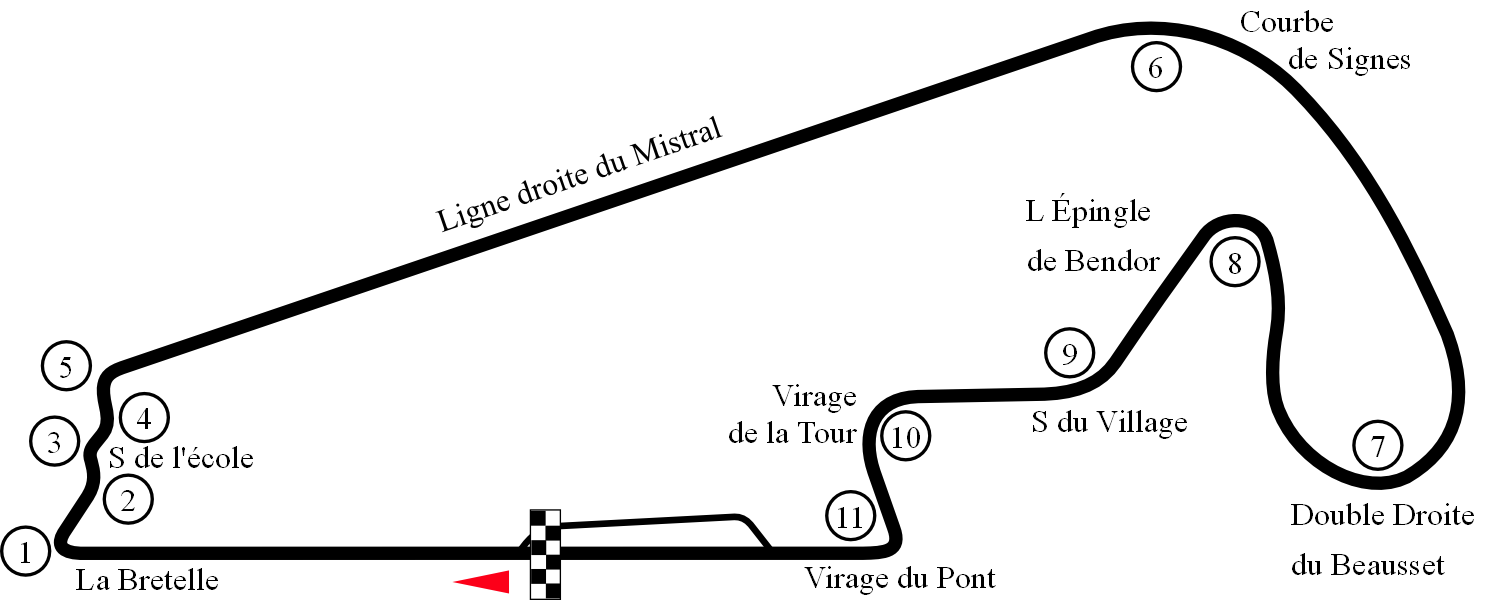
Paul Ricard Short Grand Prix Circuit (1986–2001)

Paul Ricard 1D Circuit (2002–present)

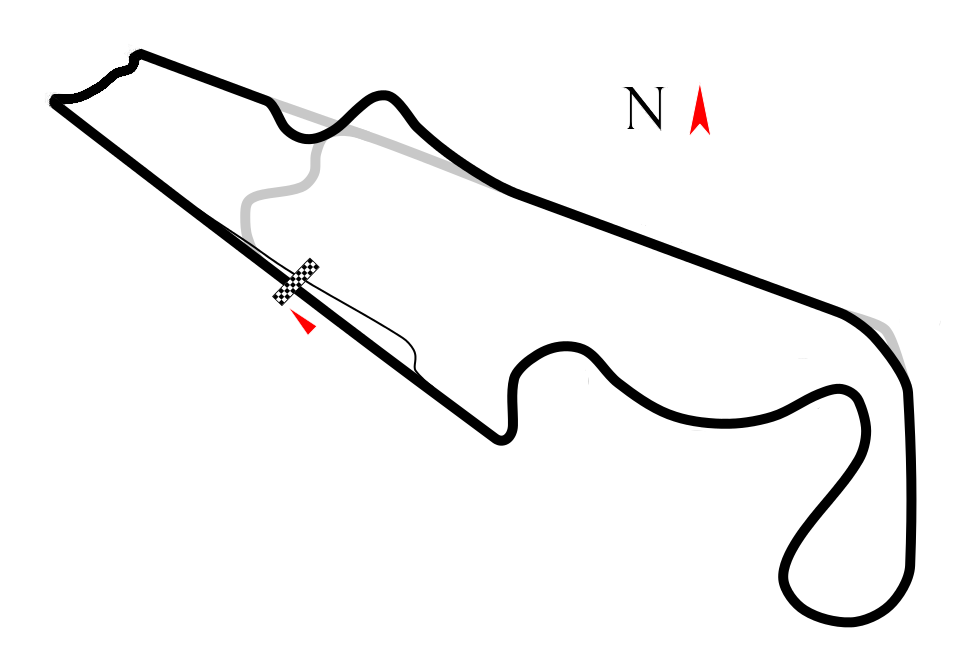
Paul Ricard 3D circuit (2002–present)

Paul Ricard 1C-V2 Circuit (2005–2018)

All layouts of Circuit Paul Ricard (2019–present)

Paul Ricard 1C-V2 Circuit (2019–present)

Paul Ricard 1A-V2 Circuit (2019–present)

== Events ==
Current

- March: Ferrari Challenge Europe, Ferrari Challenge UK, Fun Cup France
- April: GT World Challenge Europe 3 Hours of Paul Ricard, GT4 European Series, Lamborghini Super Trofeo Europe, Ultimate Cup Series, GT3 Revival Series, TCR Spain Touring Car Championship
- May: European Le Mans Series 4 Hours of Le Castellet, Championnat de France Camions FFSA Grand Prix Camions du Castellet, NASCAR Euro Series, Le Mans Cup, Eurocup-3, Ligier European Series, Grand Prix de France historique, Sunday Ride Classic
- June: 24H Series 12H Paul Ricard, TCR Europe Touring Car Series, Radical Cup Europe
- July: TCR World Tour, International GT Open, Formula Regional European Championship, Euroformula Open Championship, GT Cup Open Europe, E4 Championship
- August: Classic Endurance Racing Dix Mille Tours
- September: FIM Endurance World Championship Bol d'Or, Fun Cup France
- October: Alpine Elf Cup Series, FFSA GT Championship, Porsche Carrera Cup France, French F4 Championship, TC France Series
- November: Asian Le Mans Series 4 Hours of Le Castellet, Asian Le Mans Cup, BOSS GP Les 2 Tours d'Horloge

Future

- GT2 European Series (2015–2019, 2021–2025, 2027)
- McLaren Trophy Europe (2023, 2025, 2027)
- Prototype Cup Europe (2027)
- TCR European Endurance (2027)

Former

- Auto GP (2014)
- BPR Global GT Series (1994–1996)
- British Formula 3 International Series (1978, 2011)
- Eurocup Clio (2011–2014)
- Eurocup Mégane Trophy (2011–2013)
- European Touring Car Championship (1971–1973)
- European Touring Car Cup (2014–2016)
- European Truck Racing Championship (1985–1999)
- F1 Academy (2023)
- F2 Italian Formula Trophy (2014)
- F4 Spanish Championship (2019–2020, 2024–2025)
- Ferrari Challenge Italy (2007–2009)
- FIA European Formula 3 Championship (1977)
- FIA European Formula 3 Cup (1985)
- FIA Formula 2 Championship
  - Le Castellet Formula 2 round (2018–2019, 2022)
- FIA Formula 3 Championship (2019, 2021)
- FIA Formula 3 European Championship (2016)
- FIA GT Championship (2006, 2009)
- FIA GT1 World Championship (2010–2011)
- FIA GT3 European Championship (2009–2011)
- FIA Motorsport Games (2022)
- FIA Touring Car World Cup (1995)
- Formula 3 Euro Series (2010–2011)
- Formula 750 (1978)
- Formula One
  - French Grand Prix (1971, 1973, 1975–1976, 1978, 1980, 1982–1983, 1985–1990, 2018–2019, 2021–2022)
- Formula Renault 2.0 Alps (2011)
- Formula Renault Eurocup (1998, 2011–2014, 2016–2020)
- French Formula Renault Championship (1971–1972, 1975–1983, 1986–1990, 1992–1998)
- French Formula Three Championship (1971–1973, 1980–1983, 1985–1990, 1992–1998)
- Grand Prix motorcycle racing
  - French motorcycle Grand Prix (1973, 1975, 1977, 1980–1981, 1984, 1986, 1988, 1991, 1996–1999)
- GT4 Scandinavia (2023)
- International Sports Racing Series (1998)
- Italian F4 Championship (2018, 2021, 2023–2024)
- Italian GT Championship (1998, 2014, 2018)
- Italian Superturismo Championship (2014, 2018)
- JK Racing Asia Series (2012)
- Porsche Carrera Cup Benelux (2016, 2018)
- Porsche Carrera Cup Italia (2014, 2018)
- Porsche Supercup (2022)
- Renault Sport Trophy (2016)
- SEAT León Eurocup (2015–2016)
- Sidecar World Championship (1973, 1975, 1977, 1979–1981, 1984, 1986, 1988, 1991)
- Superbike World Championship (1989)
- Superstars GTSprint Series (2010)
- Superstars Series (2010)
- Trofeo Maserati (2015)
- World Series Formula V8 3.5 (2011–2014, 2016)
- World Sportscar Championship (1974)
- World Touring Car Championship
  - FIA WTCC Race of France (2014–2016)
- W Series (2022)

== Lap records ==
The official lap record for the current F1 circuit layout (1C-V2) is 1:32.740, set by Sebastian Vettel during the 2019 French Grand Prix. While the unofficial all-time track record is 1:28.319, set by Lewis Hamilton during final qualifying for the aforementioned 2019 race. As of November 2026, the fastest official race lap records at the Circuit Paul Ricard are listed as:

Category	Time	Driver	Vehicle	Event
Current Layout with Mistral Chicane (1C-V2) (2005–present): 5.842 km (3.630 mi)
F1	1:32.740	Sebastian Vettel	Ferrari SF90	2019 French Grand Prix
FIA F2	1:44.584	Nyck de Vries	Dallara F2 2018	2019 Le Castellet Formula 2 round
LMH	1:50.267	Yifei Ye	Ferrari 499P	2026 4 Hours of Le Castellet by ALMS
LMP2	1:50.468	Griffin Peebles	Oreca 07	2026 4 Hours of Le Castellet (ELMS)
Formula Renault 3.5	1:50.855	Pierre Gasly	Dallara T12	2014 Le Castellet Formula Renault 3.5 Series round
FIA F3	1:52.171	Marcus Armstrong	Dallara F3 2019	2019 Le Castellet Formula 3 round
GP3	1:52.551	Anthoine Hubert	Dallara GP3/16	2018 Le Castellet GP3 Series round
Euroformula Open	1:54.281	Yifei Ye	Dallara 320	2020 Le Castellet Euroformula Open round
FTwo (2009–2012)	1:55.837	Christopher Zanella	Williams JPH1B	2012 Le Castellet FTwo round
Eurocup-3	1:56.081	Keanu Al Azhari	Dallara 326	2026 Le Castellet Eurocup-3 round
LMP3	1:57.082	Manuel Espírito Santo	Ligier JS P320	2023 2nd Le Castellet Ultimate Cup round
Formula Regional	1:57.596	Gianluca Petecof	Tatuus F3 T-318	2020 Le Castellet FREC round
Silhouette racing car	1:58.627	Hugo Chevalier	Mercedes-AMG C63 DTM	2024 2nd Le Castellet Ultimate Cup Series GT-Sprint round
GT3	1:59.319	Christoph Lenz	Lamborghini Huracán GT3 Evo	2019 Le Castellet International GT Open round
CN	2:01.338	Steven Kane	Ligier JS49	2011 Le Castellet Speed Euroseries round
Formula Renault 2.0	2:02.549	Yifei Ye	Tatuus FR2.0/13	2018 Le Castellet Formula Renault Eurocup round
Lamborghini Super Trofeo	2:02.613	Loris Spinelli	Lamborghini Huracán Super Trofeo Evo2	2022 Le Castellet Lamborghini Super Trofeo Europe round
Ferrari Challenge	2:02.617	Giacomo Altoè	Ferrari 296 Challenge	2024 Le Castellet Ferrari Challenge Europe round
GT1 (GTS)	2:02.659	Enrique Bernoldi	Chevrolet Corvette C6.R	2009 FIA GT Paul Ricard 2 Hours
Renault Sport Trophy	2:03.447	Pieter Schothorst	Renault Sport R.S. 01	2016 Le Castellet Renault Sport Trophy round
SRO GT2	2:04.614	Reinhard Kofler	KTM X-Bow GT2	2024 Le Castellet GT2 European Series round
Formula 4	2:04.878	Kirill Smal	Tatuus F4-T014	2021 Le Castellet Italian F4 round
Porsche Carrera Cup	2:05.504	Florian Latorre	Porsche 911 (992 I) GT3 Cup	2021 Le Castellet Porsche Carrera Cup France round
McLaren Trophy	2:05.842	Alejandro Geppert	McLaren Artura Trophy	2025 Le Castellet McLaren Trophy Europe round
Radical Cup	2:06.096	Filip Svensson	Radical SR10	2026 Le Castellet Radical Cup Europe round
JS P4	2:08.261	Simone Riccitelli	Ligier JS P4	2026 Le Castellet Ligier European Series round
Formula 3	2:08.334	Piero Longhi	Dallara F308	2014 Le Castellet F2 Italian Formula Trophy round
GT2	2:09.245	Nicola Cadei	Ferrari F430 GTC	2010 Paul Ricard GTSprint round
GT4	2:09.541	Nico Verdonck	Aston Martin Vantage AMR GT4	2021 Le Castellet GT Cup Open Europe round
Formula Abarth	2:09.654	Jorge Bas Viguera	Tatuus FA010	2014 Le Castellet F2 Italian Formula Trophy round
Eurocup Mégane Trophy	2:12.210	Albert Costa	Renault Mégane Renault Sport II	2012 Le Castellet Eurocup Mégane Trophy round
TCR Touring Car	2:12.607	Mikhail Simonov	CUPRA León VZ TCR	2026 Le Castellet TCR Europe round
JS2 R	2:14.717	Marcus Terkildsen	Ligier JS2 R	2026 Le Castellet Ligier European Series round
Stock car racing	2:14.717	Thomas Krasonis	Chevrolet Camaro NASCAR	2026 Le Castellet NASCAR Euro Series round
Alpine Elf Cup	2:14.931	Romain Monti	Alpine A110 Cup	2025 Le Castellet Alpine Elf Cup round
Formula BMW	2:15.532	Aston Hare	Mygale FB02	2012 Le Castellet JK Racing Asia Series round
Trofeo Maserati	2:16.580	Patrick Zamparini	Maserati Trofeo	2015 Le Castellet Trofeo Maserati Corse World Series round
Formula Renault 1.6	2:16.838	Victor Martins	Signatech FR 1.6	2017 Le Castellet French F4 round
SEAT León Supercopa	2:17.872	Mikel Azcona	SEAT León Cup Racer	2016 Le Castellet SEAT León Eurocup round
Renault Clio Cup	2:26.045	David Pajot	Renault Clio R.S. IV	2019 Le Castellet Renault Clio Cup France round
Current Bike Layout without Mistral Chicane (1A-V2 Bike) (2018–present): 5.673 km (3.525 mi)
Superbike	1:52.320	Corentin Perolari	Honda CBR1000RR-R	2026 Bol d'Or
Current Layout without Mistral Chicane (1A-V2) (2005–present): 5.770 km (3.585 mi)
LMP2	1:40.139	Nyck de Vries	Aurus 01	2020 4 Hours of Le Castellet
LMP1	1:42.541	Rinaldo Capello	Audi R15 TDI plus	2010 8 Hours of Le Castellet
LMP3	1:48.988	Ben Barnicoat	Ligier JS P320	2020 1st Le Castellet Le Mans Cup round
Group C	1:49.126	Ralf Kelleners	Porsche 962C	2022 Dix Mille Tours
LM GTE	1:52.098	Andrea Piccini	Ferrari 488 GTE Evo	2020 4 Hours of Le Castellet
Formula 3	1:52.828	Daniel Abt	Dallara F308	2011 Le Castellet F3 Euro Series round
GT1 (GTS)	1:53.343	Jean-Philippe Belloc	Chevrolet Corvette C6.R	2006 FIA GT Paul Ricard 500km
GT3	1:53.750	Jake Dennis	Aston Martin Vantage AMR GT3	2019 1000 km of Paul Ricard
LMPC	1:54.627	Paul-Loup Chatin	Oreca FLM09	2013 3 Hours of Le Castellet
Porsche Carrera Cup	1:57.292	Alessandro Ghiretti	Porsche 911 (992 I) GT3 Cup	2024 Le Castellet Porsche Carrera Cup France round
Superbike	1:58.386	Randy de Puniet	Kawasaki ZX-10R	2017 Bol d'Or
JS P4	1:58.922	Theo Micouris	Ligier JS P4	2024 Le Castellet Ligier European Series round
CN	1:59.002	Ivan Bellarosa	Wolf GB08	2012 Le Castellet Speed Euroseries round
GT2	2:00.943	Marino Franchitti	Ferrari F430 GT2	2006 FIA GT Paul Ricard 500km
JS2 R	2:05.678	Viktor Shaytar	Ligier JS2 R	2020 1st Le Castellet Ligier European Series round
FIA GT Group 2	2:07.456	Bas Leinders	Gillet Vertigo Streiff	2006 FIA GT Paul Ricard 500km
FIA GT Group 3	2:08.902	Benjamin Dessange	Chevrolet Corvette Z06-R	2006 FIA GT Paul Ricard 500km
Short Circuit with Mistral chicane (3C) (2002–present): 3.841 km (2.387 mi)
Auto GP	1:18.347	Kimiya Sato	Lola B05/52	2014 Le Castellet Auto GP round
Formula 3	1:21.740	Joel Eriksson	Dallara F315	2016 Le Castellet F3 round
Formula 4	1:26.970	Nerea Martí	Tatuus F4-T421	2023 Le Castellet F1 Academy round
Porsche Carrera Cup	1:29.839	Mathieu Jaminet	Porsche 911 (991 I) GT3 Cup	2016 Le Castellet Porsche Carrera Cup France round
TC1	1:30.455	Robert Huff	Honda Civic WTCC	2016 FIA WTCC Race of France
GT4	1:31.906	Adrien Tambay	Audi R8 LMS GT4 Evo	2020 2nd Le Castellet French GT4 Cup round
TCR Touring Car	1:32.420	Teddy Clairet	Cupra León VZ TCR	2026 Le Castellet TCR World Tour round
Formula Renault 1.6	1:32.995	Sacha Fenestraz	Signatech FR 1.6	2015 Le Castellet French F4 round
Super 2000	1:35.578	Gabriele Tarquini	SEAT León Cup Racer	2016 Le Castellet ETC round
Renault Clio Cup	1:43.715	Nicolas Milan	Renault Clio R.S. V	2020 2nd Le Castellet Renault Clio Cup France round
Super 1600	1:46.740	Ulrike Krafft	Ford Fiesta 1.6 16V	2016 Le Castellet ETC round
Short Bike Layout without Mistral Chicane (3C-V2 Bike) (2018–present): 3.800 km (2.361 mi)
Superbike	1:24.254	Mike Di Meglio	Honda CBR1000RR	2023 Le Castellet French Superbike round
Supersport	1:27.299	Enzo de la Vega	Yamaha YZF-R6	2024 Le Mans French Supersport round
Supersport 300	1:38.500	Arthur Massy	Yamaha YZF-R3	2024 Le Castellet French Supersport 300 round
Short Circuit (3C) (2002–present): 3.792 km (2.356 mi)
Porsche Carrera Cup	1:23.427	Tom Dillmann	Porsche 911 (991 I) GT3 Cup	2014 Le Castellet Porsche Carrera Cup France round
Formula Renault 1.6	1:26.681	Matevos Isaakyan	Signatech FR 1.6	2013 Le Castellet French F4 round
Original Short Grand Prix Circuit (1986–2001): 3.812 km (2.369 mi)
F1	1:08.012	Nigel Mansell	Ferrari 641	1990 French Grand Prix
WSC	1:16.870	Emmanuel Collard	Ferrari 333 SP	1998 International Sports Racing Series Paul Ricard
500cc	1:21.487	Kenny Roberts Jr.	Suzuki RGV500	1999 French motorcycle Grand Prix
Formula 3	1:21.770	Didier Cottaz	Dallara F393	1993 Le Castellet French F3 round
250cc	1:23.559	Loris Capirossi	Aprilia RSV 250	1997 French motorcycle Grand Prix
GT2	1:24.447	Jean-Pierre Jarier	Porsche 911 GT2	1998 4 Hours of Le Castellet
Super Touring	1:26.698	Steve Soper	BMW 318is	1995 FIA Touring Car World Cup
125cc	1:28.383	Tomomi Manako	Honda RS125R	1997 French motorcycle Grand Prix
Formula Renault 2.0	1:30.480	Jean-Philippe Belloc	Martini MK63	1992 Le Castellet French Formula Renault round
Original Long Grand Prix Circuit (1970–2001): 5.809 km (3.610 mi)
F1	1:39.914	Keke Rosberg	Williams FW10	1985 French Grand Prix
Group 5	1:50.600	Jean-Pierre Beltoise	Matra-Simca MS670C	1974 1000 km of Castellet
GT1	1:52.653	Anders Olofsson	Ferrari F40 GTE	1996 BPR 4 Hours of Le Castellet
500cc	1:59.027	Wayne Gardner	Honda NSR500	1988 French motorcycle Grand Prix
Formula 3	1:59.459	Olivier Grouillard	Martini MK39	1983 Le Castellet French F3 round
250cc	2:03.370	Joan Garriga	Yamaha TZ 250	1988 French motorcycle Grand Prix
Group 2	2:09.900	Chris Amon (Note: Both drivers take the same lap time in this round.); Henri Pescarolo	BMW 3.0 CSL	1973 Le Castellet ETCC round
Formula Renault 2.0	2:10.650	Jean-Michel Neyrial	Martini MK26	1979 Le Castellet French Formula Renault round
125cc	2:13.350	Luca Cadalora	Garelli 125 GP	1986 French motorcycle Grand Prix
350cc	2:13.390	Takazumi Katayama	Yamaha TZ 350	1977 French motorcycle Grand Prix
Original National Circuit (1970–2001): 3.263 km (2.028 mi)
Group 5 (Sports 2000)	1:15.800	Jean-Pierre Jabouille	Alpine A441	1974 Trophée d'Europe Paul Ricard
Formula 3	1:17.060	Alex Caffi	Martini MK45	1985 FIA European Formula 3 Cup
Group 6	1:17.300	Vittorio Brambilla	Alfa Romeo T33/SC/12	1977 500 km Le Castellet
Formula Renault 2.0	1:21.520	Patrick Gonin	Martini MK33	1981 Le Castellet French Formula Renault round
World SBK	1:21.890	Giancarlo Falappa	Bimota YB4	1989 Le Castellet World SBK round
