= Williams FW10 =

Formula One racing car

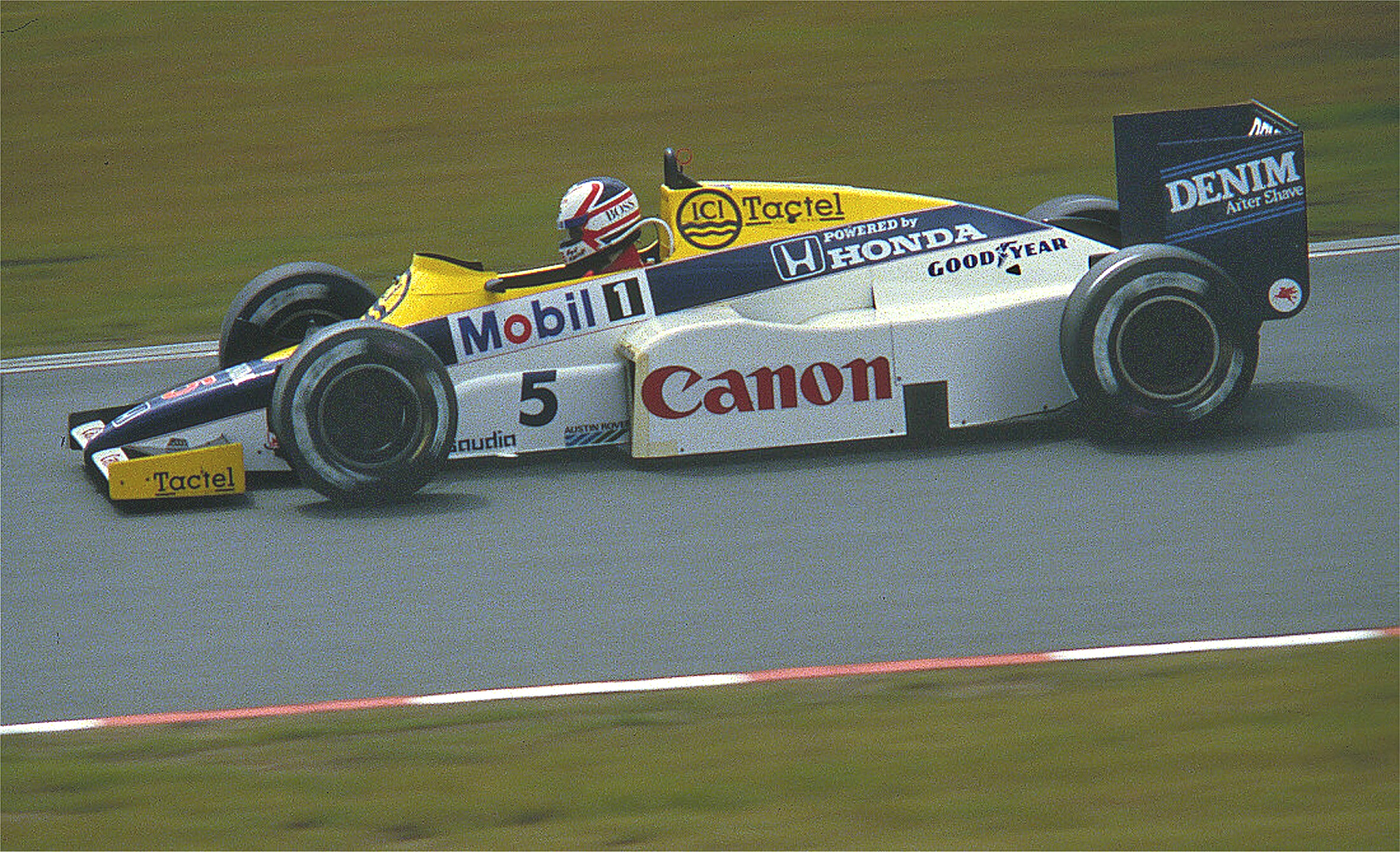
- Nigel Mansell driving the FW10 at the 1985 German Grand Prix
- Category: Formula One
- Constructor: Williams (chassis); Honda (engine)
- Designers: Patrick Head (Technical Director); Frank Dernie (Head of Aerodynamics and R&D); Osamu Goto (Engine Technical Director (Honda))
- Predecessor: FW09B
- Successor: FW11

Technical specifications
- Chassis: Moulded Carbon composite monocoque
- Suspension (front): Double wishbone, rocker-operated inboard spring damper
- Suspension (rear): Lower wishbone, rocker-operated inboard spring damper/Double wishbone, pullrod-operated inboard spring damper
- Axle track: Front: 1,803 mm (71.0 in); Rear: 1,651 mm (65.0 in)
- Wheelbase: 2,794 mm (110.0 in)
- Engine: Honda RA163E / RA165E 1.5 L (1,494 cc, 91.2 cu in) V6 twin turbocharged mid-engine
- Transmission: Williams / Hewland 6-speed manual
- Power: 800 hp @ 11,000 rpm
- Weight: 545 kg (1,202 lb)
- Fuel: Mobil
- Tyres: Goodyear

Competition history
- Notable entrants: Canon Williams Honda Team
- Notable drivers: 5. (United Kingdom) Nigel Mansell; 6. (Finland) Keke Rosberg
- Debut: 1985 Brazilian Grand Prix
- First win: 1985 Detroit Grand Prix
- Last win: 1985 Australian Grand Prix
- Last event: 1985 Australian Grand Prix
Races	Wins	Poles	F/Laps
16	4	3	4
- Constructors' Championships: 0
- Drivers' Championships: 0

The Williams FW10 is a Formula One car designed by Frank Dernie for use by the Williams team in the 1985 Formula One World Championship. It was initially powered by Honda's 1983 and 1984 V6 engine, the RA163E, before the 1985 spec engine, the RA165E was introduced at Detroit. The turbo engines in the FW10's were driven by Briton Nigel Mansell and Finland's 1982 World Champion Keke Rosberg. An upgraded version of the car, dubbed the FW10B, was introduced late in the season, which enabled the team to win the final three races of the year.

== Concept ==
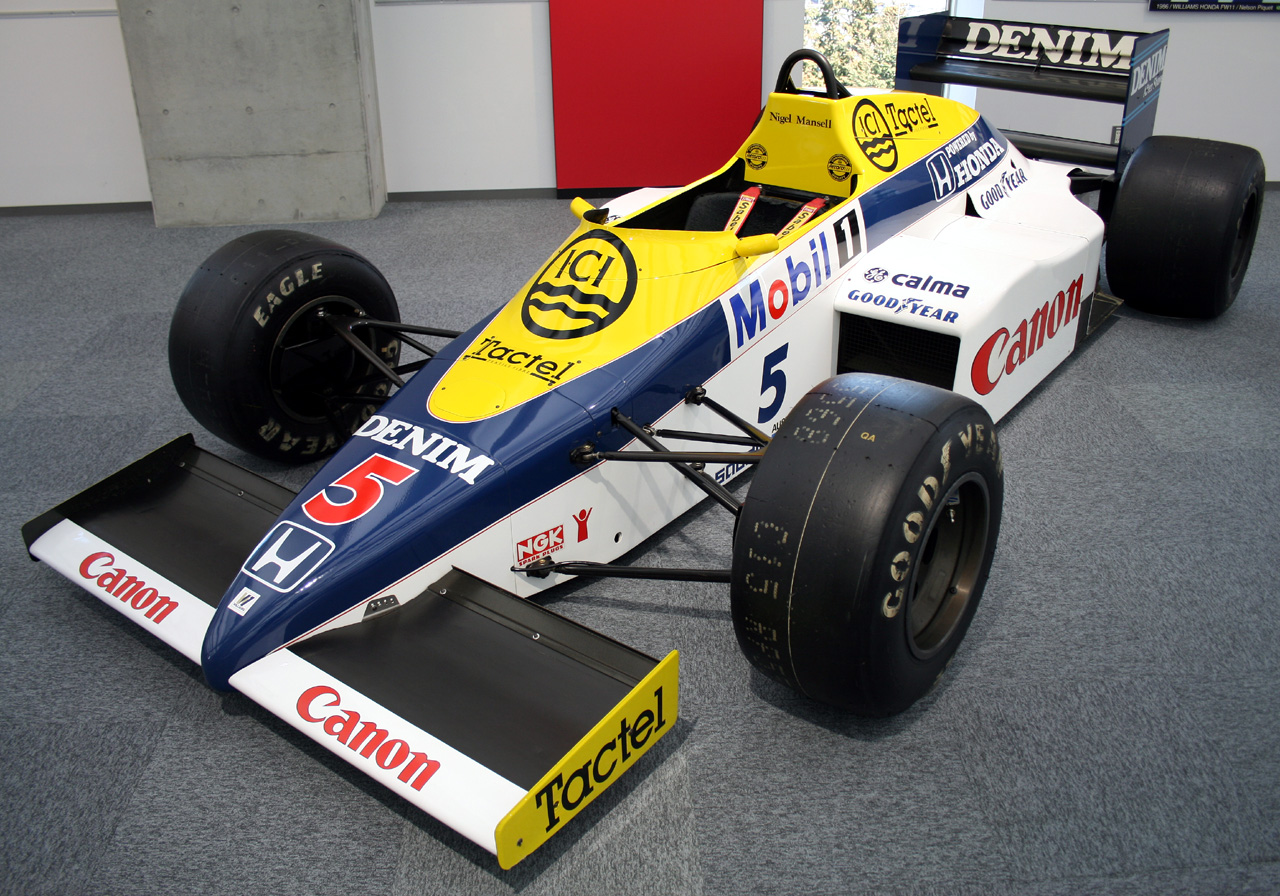
The FW10 on display at the Honda Collection Hall in Japan.

1985 marked Williams' second full season with Honda turbo power. 1984 had been difficult, as the FW09 struggled to cope with the enormous power and brutal torque curve, leading to handling problems which afflicted drivers Keke Rosberg and Jacques Laffite throughout the season. Technical director Patrick Head thus decided to make the FW10 an all-new car- making the monocoque entirely from much stiffer carbon composite, rather than the aluminium honeycomb construction of previous years - the first Williams F1 car ever to be made predominantly of this material. This construction technique had been pioneered by the McLaren team with their MP4/1 in 1981, and was in the process of being adopted by the other teams for its combination of exceptional stiffness and lightness. In total, nine FW10 tubs were built; one was sent to Japan for Honda test driver Satoru Nakajima to drive, and one was a prototype to test the construction process.

During 1985, Nigel Mansell wrote off two cars in accidents: the first when he went head-on into a barrier at Detroit, the second when he crashed heavily at Paul Ricard due to tyre blowout at over 200 mph (322 km/h), unwittingly setting the record for the highest-speed crash in Formula One. The Honda engine proved to be extremely powerful, with Head claiming around 1000–1250 bhp in qualifying, and up to 900 bhp (670 kW) in race configuration.

== Racing history ==
The team had a much better season than in the previous two years, scoring four wins and taking third place in the Constructors' Championship. During the early part of the season the cars made do with upgraded 1984 engines. Honda introduced a completely new RA165-E engine at Montreal, which had smaller turbos (with a very small drop-off in power which was recovered thanks to improved engine and turbo technology), and instantly the cars were on the pace, with both Rosberg and Mansell expressing delight in the power of the new engine and how much easier it was to drive being less 'peaky' with a much smoother power delivery. Rosberg won in Detroit, whilst further developments to the engine in the final stages of the season saw the FW10B win the final three races of the season which allowed Williams to snatch third place in the Constructors' Championship on a count-back from Lotus.

Mansell, having joined the team from Lotus at the beginning of the year, took his first F1 victory on home soil at Brands Hatch for the European Grand Prix, and immediately followed it up with his second, in South Africa. Rosberg then took his second win of the season, and his fifth and final victory overall, at the last race of the season in Australia.

During qualifying for the British Grand Prix at Silverstone, Rosberg lapped the 4.719 km (2.932 mi) circuit in his FW10 in a time of 1:05.591 for an average speed of 160.9 mph (258.9 km/h), the first time a Formula One car had broken the 160 mph barrier for a qualifying lap. This record would stand until 2002. Rosberg's achievement was made more impressive by the fact that he was running on slick qualifying tyres at a time when the track was damp from light rain, and he also had a deflating tyre for most of the lap.

Autocourse picked the FW10 as the third-best car of 1985, behind the Lotus 97T and the McLaren MP4/2B, and the chassis also won Autosport magazine's "racing car of the year" award. The FW10 also acted as an important step-up for the team to 1986 and 1987, in which the FW11 was generally the class of the field.

The FW10 was the first Williams car to sport the distinctive yellow, blue and white livery that the team would use until the end of the 1993 season.

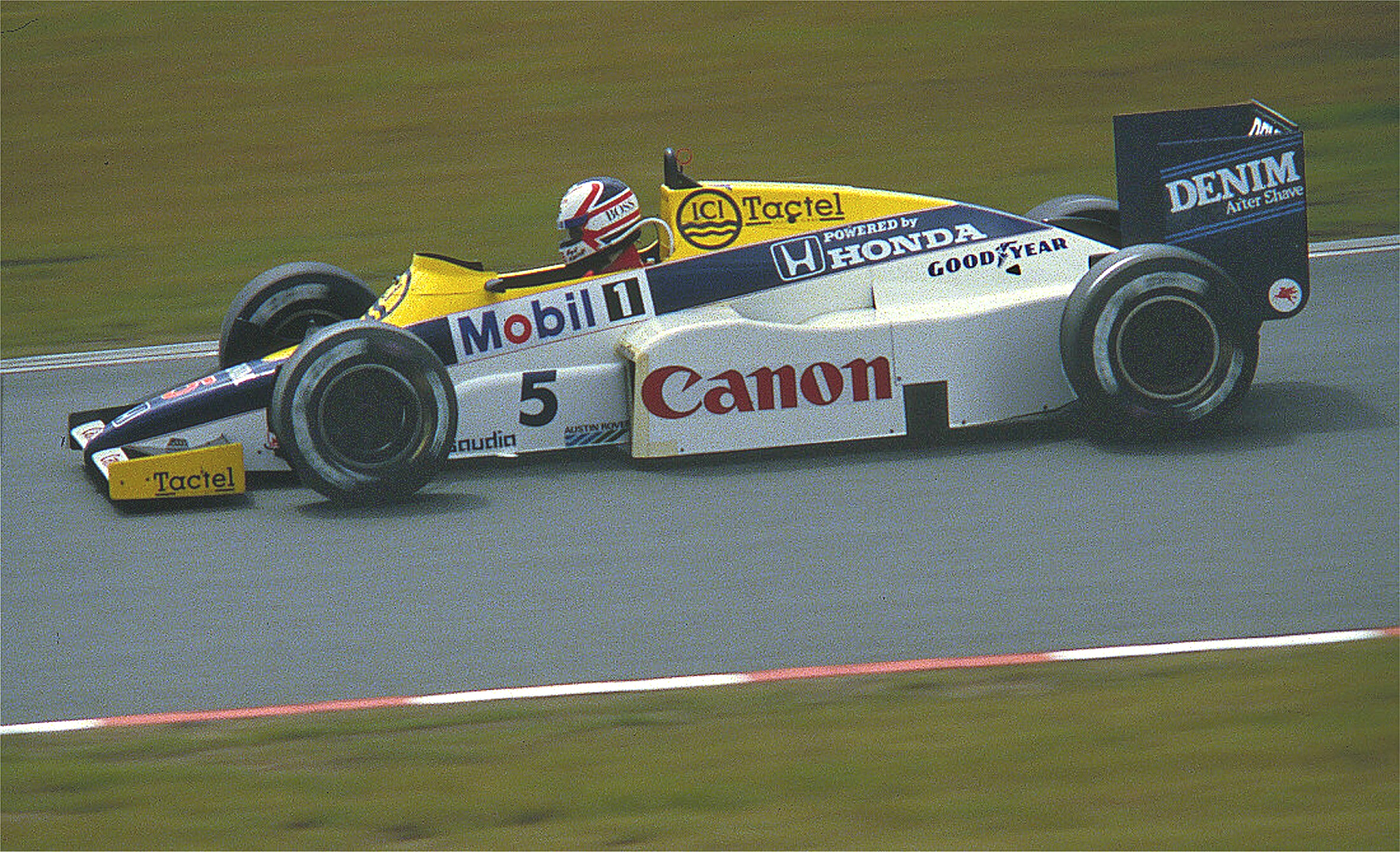
Nigel Mansell driving the FW10 at the 1985 German Grand Prix, in which he finished sixth.

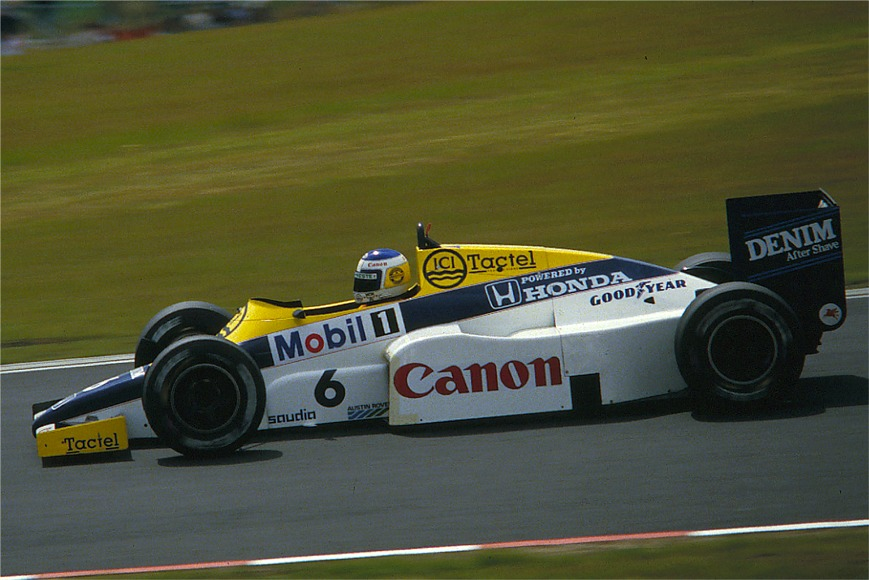
Keke Rosberg driving the FW10, also at the German Grand Prix, in which he finished twelfth.

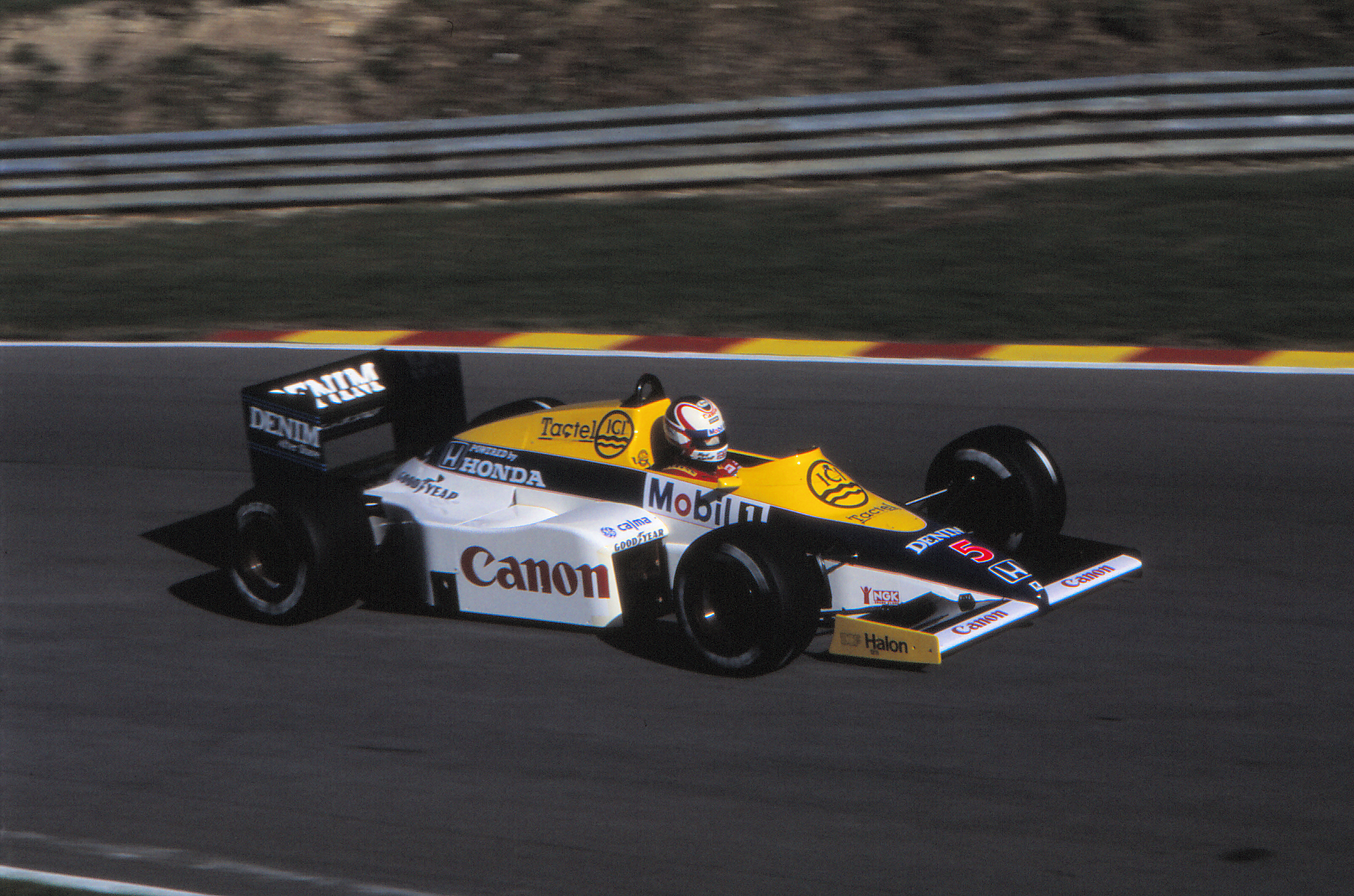
Mansell during practice for the 1985 European Grand Prix, at which he took his first F1 victory.

== Complete Formula One results ==
(key) (Results in bold indicate pole position; results in italics indicate fastest lap.)

Year	Team	Engine	Tyres	Drivers	1	2	3	4	5	6	7	8	9	10	11	12	13	14	15	16	Points	WCC
1985	Canon Williams	Honda RA163E 1.5 V6t; Honda RA165E 1.5 V6t	**G**		BRA	POR	SMR	MON	CAN	DET	FRA	GBR	GER	AUT	NED	ITA	BEL	EUR	RSA	AUS	**71**	**3rd**
1985	Canon Williams	Honda RA163E 1.5 V6t; Honda RA165E 1.5 V6t	**G**	Nigel Mansell	Ret	5	5	7	6	Ret	DNS	Ret	6	Ret	6	11	2	1	**1**	Ret	**71**	**3rd**
1985	Canon Williams	Honda RA163E 1.5 V6t; Honda RA165E 1.5 V6t	**G**	Keke Rosberg	Ret	Ret	Ret	8	4	1	**2**	**Ret**	12	Ret	Ret	Ret	4	3	2	1	**71**	**3rd**

Awards
Preceded by McLaren MP4/2	Autosport; Racing Car Of The Year; 1985	Succeeded by Williams FW11
