= 2024 E1 Series Championship =

Electric car racing season

The 2024 UIM E1 World Championship was the inaugural season of the E1 Series electric powerboat racing series. The season launched on 2 February in Jeddah, Saudi Arabia.

Team Brady were crowned as the champions on October 29th.

== Calendar ==
The season was originally supposed to begin in 2023, with a goal to have about one race per month. A need for more teams caused delays to the start, with the first calendar being officially released on June 8, 2023. The provisional calendar had the first race set to take place during January 2024 in Jeddah, Saudi Arabia, with the season finale in Rotterdam, Netherlands in September 2024. On December 20, 2023, a new calendar was released, which saw the series expand to three regions (Europe, the Middle East, and Asia), with the premiere getting pushed back to February. This version also featured a race in Geneva, Switzerland, which has since been removed from the calendar. On June 26, 2024, a race was announced for Lake Como, which replaced Rotterdam as the location of the fifth round. On October 29th, 2024, Team Brady was announced as the champions, ending the season early and forgoing the planned Hong Kong race.

Round	Dates	Event	Location
1	2–3 February 2024	E1 Jeddah GP	Jeddah, Saudi Arabia
2	11–12 May 2024	E1 Venice GP	Venice, Italy
3	1–2 June 2024	E1 Puerto Banús GP	Puerto Banús, Spain
4	26–27 July 2024	E1 Monaco GP	Monaco
5	23–24 August 2024	E1 Lake Como GP	Como, Italy

The following events were on the original calendar, but did not appear in the final version.

Dates	Event	Location
29–30 June 2024	E1 Geneva GP	Geneva, Switzerland
7–8 September 2024	E1 Rotterdam GP	Rotterdam, Netherlands
9-10 November 2024	E1 Hong Kong GP	Hong Kong, China

== Race format ==
A race weekend consists of testing, free practice, and qualifying on the first day, while the semi-finals, play-off race, eliminator race, place race, and finals all take place on the second day.

The first race in Jeddah featured a modified format, as there were only 8 teams. For rounds 2–6, the format was changed to accommodate the extra entry of Westbrook Racing, which brought the total number of teams up to 9.

Qualifying is three sets of three racers, with each team getting two sessions in order to allow both pilots to set a time. After qualifying, the teams are split into three groups of 3, racing against each other in 6 semi-final races. The top team in each group automatically goes to the final, while the second-place finishers battle in a Playoff race for the last spot. The third-place finishers race in an Eliminator race, with the last-place finisher placing 9th for the event. The bottom two teams in the Playoff, and the top two teams in the Eliminator then compete in the Place Race, for positions 5 through 9. The top four teams compete in the Final, which consists of the combined results of Super Final 1 and Super Final 2.

== Teams and drivers ==
=== UIM E1 Pilot Academy ===
The UIM E1 Pilot Academy was created to train a new generation of racers to compete in the E1 Series. Female and male athletes with experience in motorsport, cycling, Esports, extreme sports and high-speed sports were invited to apply. A total of 34 racers took part in the training, with 18 being selected to compete in the inaugural season of the series.

Group 1

- (United States) Jordan Rand
- (United Kingdom) Kriss Kyle
- (Spain) Cris Lazarraga (Note: Selected to compete in the 2024 season)
- (India) CS Santosh
- (Finland) Emma Kimiläinen
- (United Arab Emirates) Ahmad Alfahim

Group 2

- (Spain) Laia Sanz
- (Sweden) Timmy Hansen
- (Latvia) Ieva Millere-Hagin (Note: Piloted the Racebird for the Test Event in Rotterdam in November 2023) (Note: Competed in the 2024 season as a substitute driver)
- (Sweden) Erik Stark
- (Monaco) Lisa Caussin Battaglia
- (United Kingdom) Phelim Kavanagh

Group 3

- (United Kingdom) Catie Munnings
- (Italy) Gianluca Carli
- (United States) Sara Price
- (Italy) Alex Carella
- (United States) Alex Pratt
- (United Kingdom) Lewis Appiagyei

Group 4

- (Italy) Vicky Piria
- (Spain) Dani Clos
- (United Kingdom) Oban Duncan
- (Colombia) Sebastian Ordonez
- (Saudi Arabia) Mashael AlObaidan
- (Kuwait) Yousef Al-Abdulrazzaq

Group 5

- (Italy) Alberto Comparato
- (Spain) Lucas Ordóñez
- (United Kingdom) Sam Coleman
- (Saudi Arabia) Saud Ahmed
- (Italy) Alex Carella

Group 6

- (Monaco) Giacomo Sacchi
- (Singapore) Janice Oo
- (Italy) Andrea Comella
- (Saudi Arabia) Rinad Hafez
- (Singapore) Clemet Tham

=== Official Entries ===
Team	No.	Drivers	Rounds
(India) Team Blue Rising	05	(United Kingdom) Phelim Kavanagh	1–4
(India) Team Blue Rising	05	(United States) John Peeters	5
(India) Team Blue Rising	05	(Monaco) Lisa Caussin Battaglia	All
(Ivory Coast) Team Drogba	07	(Kuwait) Yousef Al-Abdulrazzaq	All
(Ivory Coast) Team Drogba	07	(United Kingdom) Oban Duncan	All
(Spain) Team Rafa	09	(Spain) Cris Lazarraga	All
(Spain) Team Rafa	09	(France) Tom Chiappe	All
Team Brazil by Claure Group	10	(United Kingdom) Catie Munnings	All
Team Brazil by Claure Group	10	(Sweden) Timmy Hansen	1–3, 5
Team Brazil by Claure Group	10	(Germany) Stefan Hagin	4
(Mexico) Sergio Pérez E1 Team	11	(Italy) Vicky Piria	1–3
(Mexico) Sergio Pérez E1 Team	11	(Latvia) Ieva Millere-Hagin	4–5
(Mexico) Sergio Pérez E1 Team	11	(Spain) Dani Clos	All
(United States) Team Brady	12	(Finland) Emma Kimiläinen	All
(United States) Team Brady	12	(United Kingdom) Sam Coleman	All
(United States) Team Miami powered by Magnus	16	(United States) Anna Glennon	All
(United States) Team Miami powered by Magnus	16	(Sweden) Erik Stark	All
(Saudi Arabia) Aoki Racing Team	77	(Saudi Arabia) Mashael AlObaidan	All
(Saudi Arabia) Aoki Racing Team	77	(Saudi Arabia) Saud Ahmed	All
(United States) Westbrook Racing	88	(Spain) Lucas Ordóñez	2–5
(United States) Westbrook Racing	88	(United States) Sara Price	2–5

- On April 27, 2021 it was announced that the Venice Racing Team, headed by entrepreneur Francesco Pannoli, would be the first team to join the inaugural season of the E1 Series, which was supposed to take place in 2023. The team was still included in competitor lists as late as August 2023, but did not appear on the final roster for the 2024 season.
- Ieva Millere-Hagin, Stefan Hagin, and John Peeters all competed as replacement pilots at certain rounds during the season.

== Season summary ==
=== Race 1: Jeddah ===
Team Miami led the qualifying on day 1, earning an extra point in the championship. In the semifinals, Team Brady and Team Rafa topped their respective groups, while Team Miami and Team Blue Rising also qualified for the final. Super Final 1 was led by Team Rafa, followed by Team Miami and Team Brady. In Super Final 2, spray blocked Team Rafa's Cris Lazarraga's view, causing her to cut a corner and take an additional long lap as a penalty. Sam Coleman took the lead of Super Final 2, and clinched the overall final for Team Brady.

=== Race 2: Venice ===
Team Miami claimed their second consecutive pole position, while Team Blue Rising failed to set a qualifying time, and both Team Rafa and Aoki Racing Team had one of their session's lap times disqualified. Team Brazil, Team Drogba, and newcomers Westbrook Racing were the three seminfinal winners, earning an automatic spot in the final. Team Brady won the play-off race to clinch the fourth spot in the finals, while Team Checo lost the eliminator race and was therefore out of the place race. Team Brady had a dominant showing, winning Super Final 1 and 2 to earn their second victory in the series.

=== Race 3: Puerto Banús ===
Choppy waters at the third event shook up the standings. Team Drogba claimed pole position, while two-time winners Team Brady were eliminated after a power outage in Semifinal 3. Team Blue Rising clinched fourth place overall, but had to withdraw from Super Final 2 after the nose of their craft detached while racing in Super Final 1. The same thing happened to Team Brazil in Super Final 2, while Westbrook Racing stalled mid-race but crossed the finish line in second and picked up an extra point for the fastest lap. Team Miami won their first final, and moved to first in the standings.

=== Race 4: Monaco ===
Husband and wife duo Ieva Millere-Hagin and Stefan Hagin subbed in for Team Checo and Team Brazil, respectively. Team Brazil faced issues with their RaceBird during the weekend, ending in last place. Team Rafa claimed their first pole position and first semi-finals win, while Team Brady returned to the top step of the podium, despite taking second in both finals races. Team Aoki and Team Checo both received yellow cards for dangerous driving, the first of the season.

=== Race 5: Lake Como ===
Team Westbrook took their first finals victory, as Lucas Ordóñez won Super Final 1. Team Brady's Emma Kimiläinen damaged her left foil when she hit a buoy in Super Final 2, which meant Sara Price's second-place finish clinched the victory for Westbrook.

== Results and standings ==
Round	Event	Qualifying	Fastest Lap	Semifinal 1&4	Semifinal 2&5	Semifinal 3&6	Super Final 1	Super Final 2	Final Overall
1 (Note: Race 1 had a different format, with 4 semi-finals instead of 6)	(Saudi Arabia) E1 Jeddah GP	(United States) Team Miami	(Spain) Team Rafa	(United States) Team Brady	(Spain) Team Rafa		(Spain) Team Rafa	(United States) Team Brady	(United States) Team Brady
2	(Italy) E1 Venice GP	(United States) Team Miami	(United States) Team Brady	Team Brazil	(United States) Westbrook Racing	(Ivory Coast) Team Drogba	(United States) Team Brady	(United States) Team Brady	(United States) Team Brady
3	(Spain) E1 Puerto Banús GP	(Ivory Coast) Team Drogba	(United States) Westbrook Racing	Team Brazil	(United States) Westbrook Racing	(United States) Team Miami	Team Brazil	(United States) Team Miami	(United States) Team Miami
4	E1 Monaco GP	(Spain) Team Rafa	(United States) Team Brady	(Spain) Team Rafa	(United States) Westbrook Racing	(Ivory Coast) Team Drogba	(Ivory Coast) Team Drogba	(Spain) Team Rafa	(United States) Team Brady
5	(Italy) E1 Lake Como GP	(United States) Team Brady	(Saudi Arabia) Aoki Racing Team	Team Brazil	(Spain) Team Rafa	(United States) Team Brady	(United States) Westbrook Racing	(Spain) Team Rafa	(United States) Westbrook Racing

Scoring system

Points are awarded to all 9 teams. An additional point is given to the fastest team in qualifying, and the team with the fastest lap. For the first race, because there were only 8 teams, the point system was slightly different.

Position	1st	2nd	3rd	4th	5th	6th	7th	8th	9th	Q	L
Race 1	20	16	13	10	7	5	3	1		1	1
Races 2–6	20	16	13	10	7	5	3	2	1	1	1

=== Teams' Championship standings ===
Pos.	Team	JED (Saudi Arabia)	VEN (Italy)	PUE (Spain)	MON (Monaco)	LCO (Italy)	Points
1	(United States) Team Brady	1^{5}	1^{2}	9^{3}	1^{6}	**5^{1}**	71
2	(United States) Westbrook Racing		3^{5}	2^{2}	4^{9}	1^{4}	60
3	(United States) Team Miami powered by Magnus	**2^{1}**	**5^{1}**	1^{6}	6^{5}	7^{3}	53
4	(Spain) Team Rafa	3^{2}	6^{7 (Note: Second session resulted in DQ)}	8^{4}	**3^{1}**	2^{2}	51
5	Team Brazil by Claure Group	8^{3}	2^{4}	3^{7}	9^{7}	3^{7}	44
6	(Ivory Coast) Team Drogba	6^{4}	4^{3}	**5^{1}**	2^{3}	6^{5}	44
7	(India) Team Blue Rising	4^{6}	8^{9 (Note: No time submitted)}	4^{9}	5^{4}	8^{9 (Note: First session resulted in DQ)}	31
8	(Saudi Arabia) Aoki Racing Team	7^{7}	7^{8}	6^{8}	7^{2}	4^{6}	25
9	(Mexico) Sergio Pérez E1 Team	5^{8}	9^{6}	7^{5}	8^{8}	9^{8}	14
Pos.	Team	JED (Saudi Arabia)	VEN (Italy)	PUE (Spain)	MON (Monaco)	LCO (Italy)	Points

Key
Colour	Result
Gold	Winner
Silver	2nd place
Bronze	3rd place
Green	Other points position
Black	Disqualified (DSQ)
White	Did not start (DNS)
White	Withdrew (WD)
White	Race cancelled (C)

**Bold** – Pole
Italics – Fastest lap
^{Superscript} – Qualifying position

=== Drivers' Championship standings ===
Pos.	Driver	JED (Saudi Arabia)	VEN (Italy)	PUE (Spain)	MON (Monaco)	LCO (Italy)	Points
1	(Finland) Emma Kimiläinen (United Kingdom) Sam Coleman	1^{5}	1^{2}	9^{3}	1^{6}	**5^{1}**	71
2	(United States) Sara Price (Spain) Lucas Ordóñez		3^{5}	2^{2}	4^{9}	1^{4}	60
3	(United States) Anna Glennon (Sweden) Erik Stark	**2^{1}**	**5^{1}**	1^{6}	6^{5}	7^{3}	53
4	(Spain) Cris Lazarraga (France) Tom Chiappe	3^{2}	6^{7}	8^{4}	**3^{1}**	2^{2}	51
5	(United Kingdom) Catie Munnings	8^{3}	2^{4}	3^{7}	9^{7}	3^{7}	44
6	(Kuwait) Yousef Al-Abdulrazzaq (United Kingdom) Oban Duncan	6^{4}	4^{3}	**5^{1}**	2^{3}	6^{5}	44
7	(Sweden) Timmy Hansen	8^{3}	2^{4}	3^{7}		3^{7}	43
8	(Monaco) Lisa Caussin Battaglia	4^{6}	8^{9}	4^{9}	5^{4}	8^{9}	31
9	(United Kingdom) Phelim Kavanagh	4^{6}	8^{9}	4^{9}	5^{4}		29
10	(Saudi Arabia) Mashael AlObaidan (Saudi Arabia) Saud Ahmedt	7^{7}	7^{8}	6^{8}	7^{2}	4^{6}	25
11	(Spain) Dani Clos	5^{8}	9^{6}	7^{5}	8^{8}	9^{8}	14
12	(Italy) Vicky Piria	5^{8}	9^{6}	7^{5}			11
13	(Latvia) Ieva Millere-Hagin				8^{8}	9^{8}	3
14	(United States) John Peeters					8^{9}	2
15	(Germany) Stefan Hagin				9^{7}		1
Pos.	Driver	JED (Saudi Arabia)	VEN (Italy)	PUE (Spain)	MON (Monaco)	LCO (Italy)	Points
