= E1 Lagos GP =

Annual electric powerboat race in Lagos, Nigeria

E1 Lagos
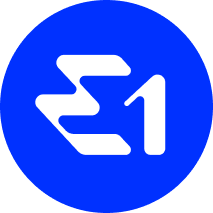
- Category: Electric powerboat racing
- Country: Nigeria
- Inaugural season: 2025
- Official website: https://www.e1lagos.com

E1 Lagos is the African edition of the UIM E1 World Championship. Scheduled to take place in Lagos, Nigeria in October 2025, the event marks the debut of E1 racing on the African continent, hosted in partnership with the Lagos State Government.

== History ==
The UIM E1 Series is a Union Internationale Motonautique-sanctioned, all-electric international offshore powerboat racing series. The UIM E1 World Championship was launched to pioneer sustainable racing on water using electric-powered boats. Since its inception, E1 has hosted events in various global cities, positioning itself as the world's first electric powerboat series.

Lagos was confirmed in early 2025 as the first African host city. The announcement was made with the involvement of international sporting figures, including former Chelsea striker Didier Drogba who joined Governor Babajide Sanwo-Olu to unveil Lagos as the host city.
