= Anthony Radetic =

American paraplegic athlete (born 1979)

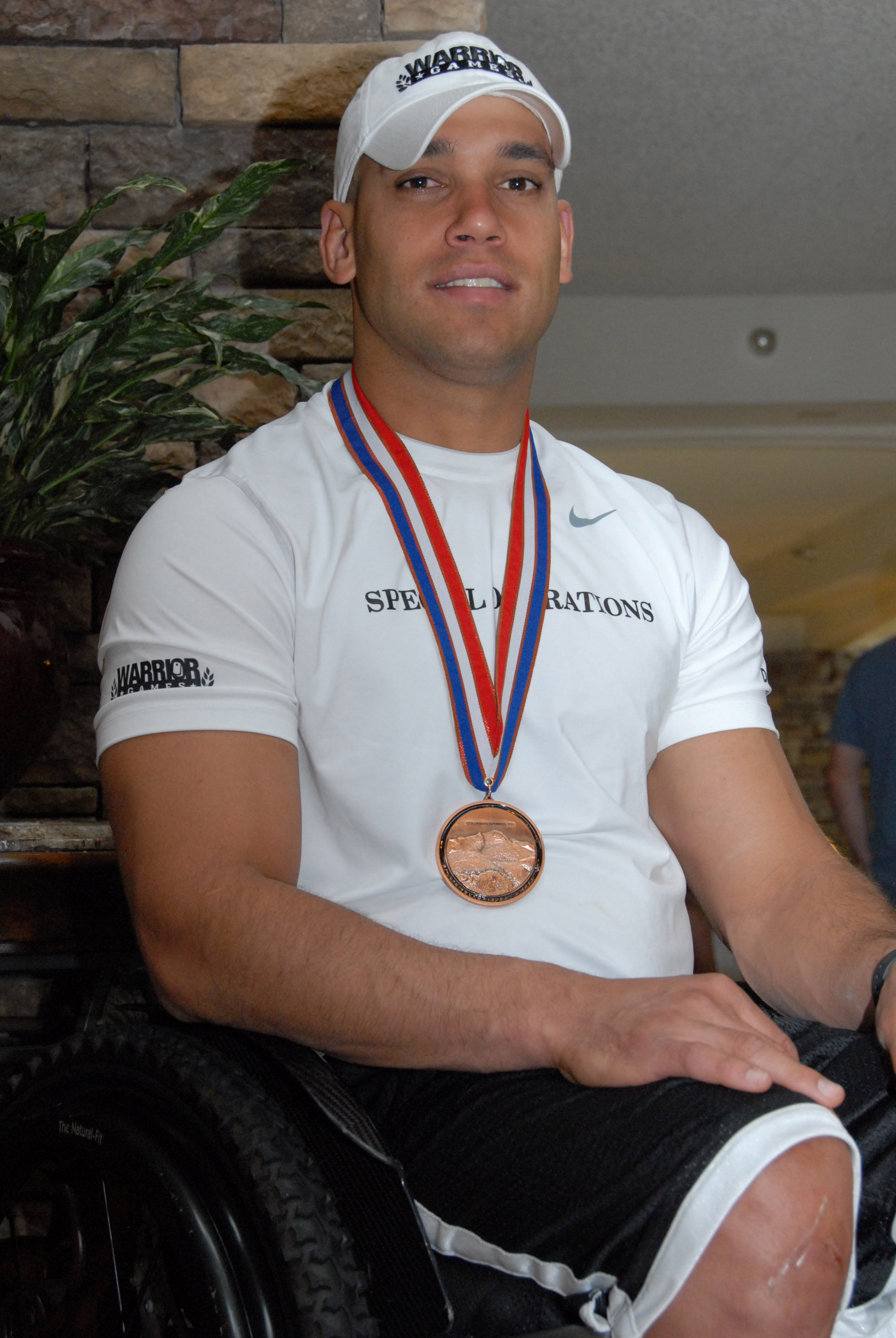
- Born: Anthony Radetic; February 10, 1979 (age 47); Fort Lauderdale, Florida
- Other name: Nickname "Rad Man"
- Occupation: Professional Personal Watercraft Racer
- Years active: 2012--
- Organization(s): Retired, U. S. Army, Blackhawk Pilot
- Spouse: Danielle Radetic (married 2012-present)
- Children: 2
- Website: www.anthonyradetic.com

Anthony Radetic is an American professional personal watercraft champion, alpine skier, and former U. S. Army Blackhawk Pilot. A paraplegic due to a motorcycle accident, Radetic competed during the 2014 and 2016 Invictus Games and is the winner of national and international extreme sports competitions.

== Early career and education ==
Born in Ft. Lauderdale, Florida, Radetic began pursuing a career as a fighter pilot at the age of 14. He attended a military boarding school, Florida Air Academy High School, in Melbourne, Florida. While there, an eyesight condition interrupted his plans to become a pilot. After graduating from high school in 1997, he attended Embry Riddle Aeronautical University in Daytona Beach, Florida, and majored in Aerospace Engineering. Two years later, Radetic changed pursuits and enlisted in the U. S. Army.

== Career ==
=== U. S. Army ===
Radetic began his career in the Army as a parachute rigger in 2000. He became a Special Forces soldier after completing key training components including finishing airborne school in Fort Benning, GA, a station at Camp Mackall, and completion of the Army's Primary Leadership Development program in Fort Bragg, North Carolina. While serving as a Special Forces Sargeant, Radetic received surgery to correct his vision. He was selected for the Army Laser Surgery Program, which allowed soldiers with corrective eye surgery to attend flight school. After becoming a Warrant Officer 1, Radetic completed flight training and was eventually positioned as a Blackhawk VIP Pilot in Fort Benning, GA. He was training at Fort Rucker in Alabama when his accident occurred.

==== Injury ====
On February 17, 2004, a car pulled out in front of Radetic's motorcycle, and the impact left him paralyzed and unable to walk. He experienced a spinal cord injury at the C2, C3, T7, and T8 levels, and was placed in intensive care. Afterwards, Radetic spent six months at the Charlie Norwood VA Medical Center in Augusta, Georgia for treatment. During the first year post-injury, Radetic had to relearn basic life skills and a new way of living. He credits the personnel at the James A. Haley Veterans' Hospital in Tampa, Florida, and the Paralyzed Veterans of America for making the transition. Radetic was medically retired as a U.S. Army Blackhawk helicopter pilot in 2010.

=== Professional life ===
==== Handcycling ====
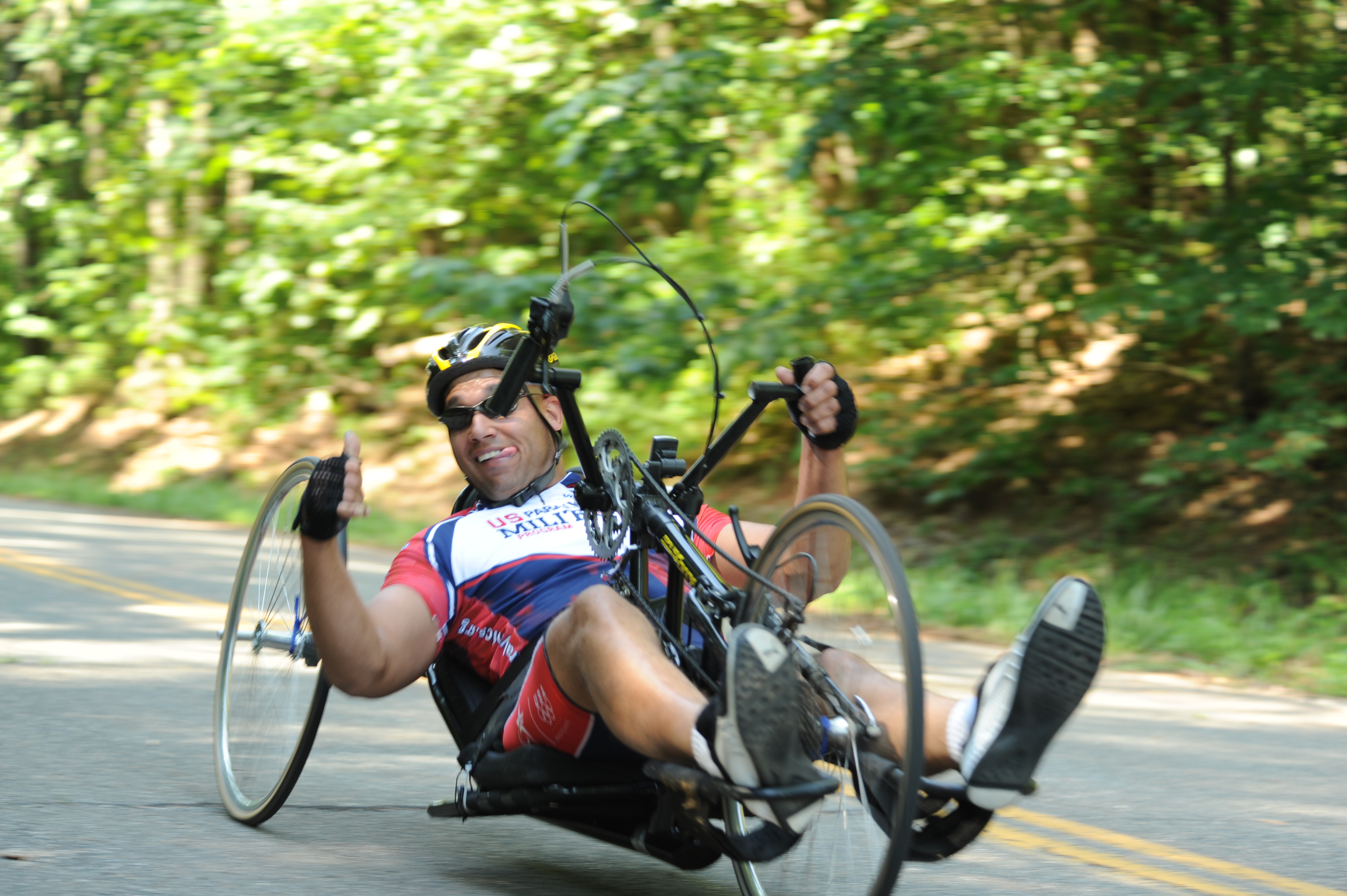
Radetic, 2016 United States Marines Corps Cycling Event

Radetic's inability to walk led to three years of depression. To remain active while adventure seeking, adaptive sports became a choice beginning with hand cycling but further encompassing skiing and watercraft racing. Entering in monthly tournaments with able bodied competitors was the next step. Initial wins included the Costa Rica Tamarindo Marathon in 2017 where he placed first and the Chicago marathon in 2018 where he placed second. The extreme sports of skiing and personal watercraft racing followed.

==== Skiing ====
In 2010, Radetic began his journey as an alpine skier at a clinic in West Virginia using a sit-ski. Two years later, he was preparing for global competitions in Aspen, Colorado as a part of the U. S. Development Ski Team. It was in Aspen that Radetic performed a now famous back-flip. He currently uses a mono-ski to navigate the slopes.

==== Personal watercraft racing ====
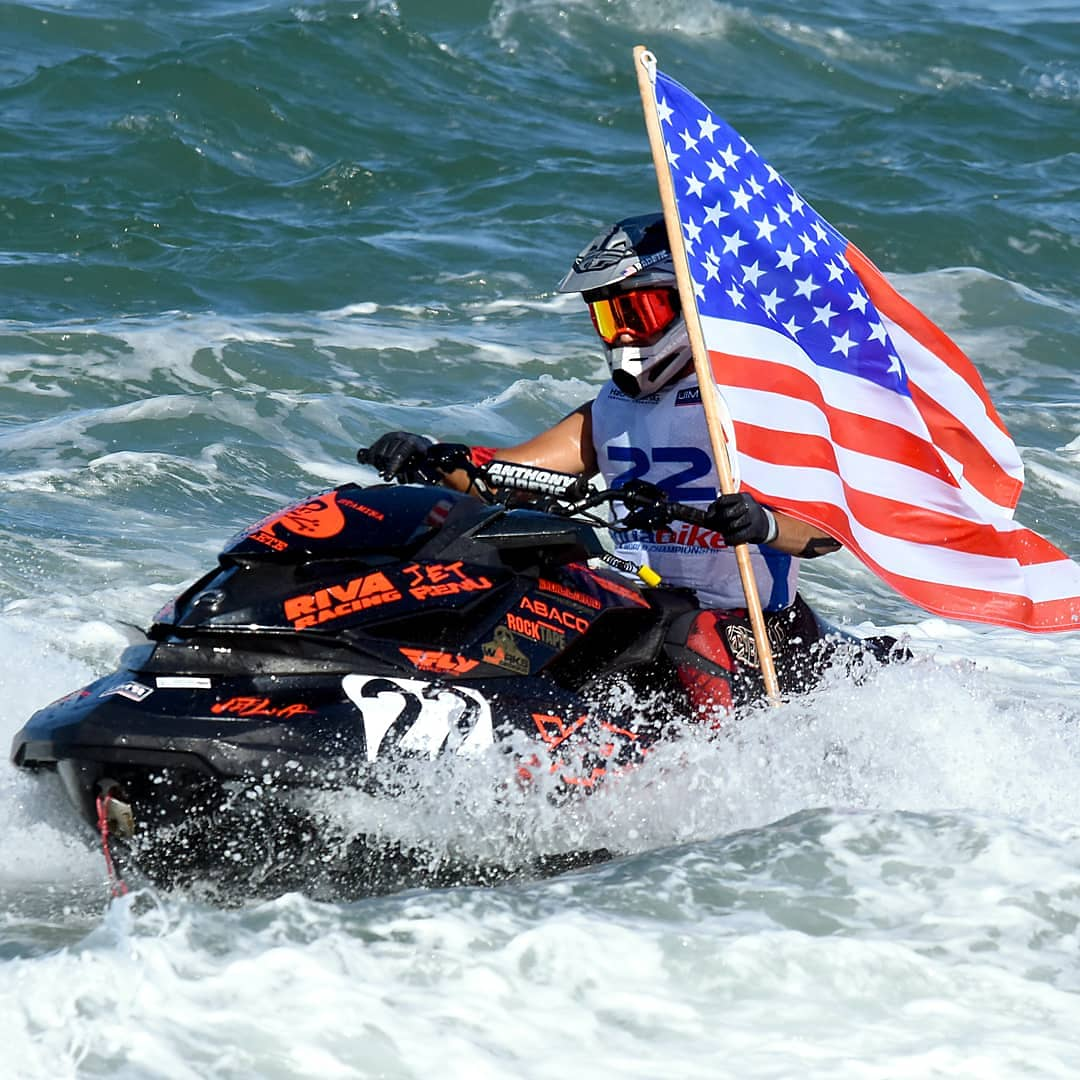
Radetic on a Sea-Doo preparing for a July 4, 2019 race

Radetic competed in different adaptive sports at a professional level until he found what he describes as "the perfect fit." Radetic's wife, Danielle, suggested Personal Watercraft Racing since it was the closest to riding a motorcycle. His competitive breakthrough came in 2013 when he participated in the Never Quit Challenge that included a 1,600 watercraft journey from Florida to New York. The next year, Radetic began a professional watercraft racing career in 2014 using a Sea-Doo vehicle. Competing in the first P1 AquaX tour in 2015, Radetic quickly became not only an inspiration but an American sporting legend. That year, he received the series "Athlete of the Year" award. A significant international accomplishment was achieved at the 5-day 2016 Russky Grand Prix in Vladivostok, Russia where Radetic was the sole USA entrant. There, as the only disabled racer, he placed 2nd.

Radetic turned pro as a Personal Watercraft Racer in 2017 and as of 2020, he is ranked 31st in the world. For Sea-Doo, Radetic races in league with all other competitors, and there is no distinction made based upon his disability. The adaptive watercraft vehicle is manufactured by Sea-Doo RXPX, and designed by Riva, including a custom seat from BlackTip Jetsports.

Radetic is a 2021 Rider for the Aquabike World Championship in the Runabout GP1. The event attracts the world's best riders and includes freestyle artistry and aerial acrobatics. Radetic's most recent adaptive sport endeavor is sailing, where he participates in outings organized by the Warrior Sailing Program.

==== Invictus games ====
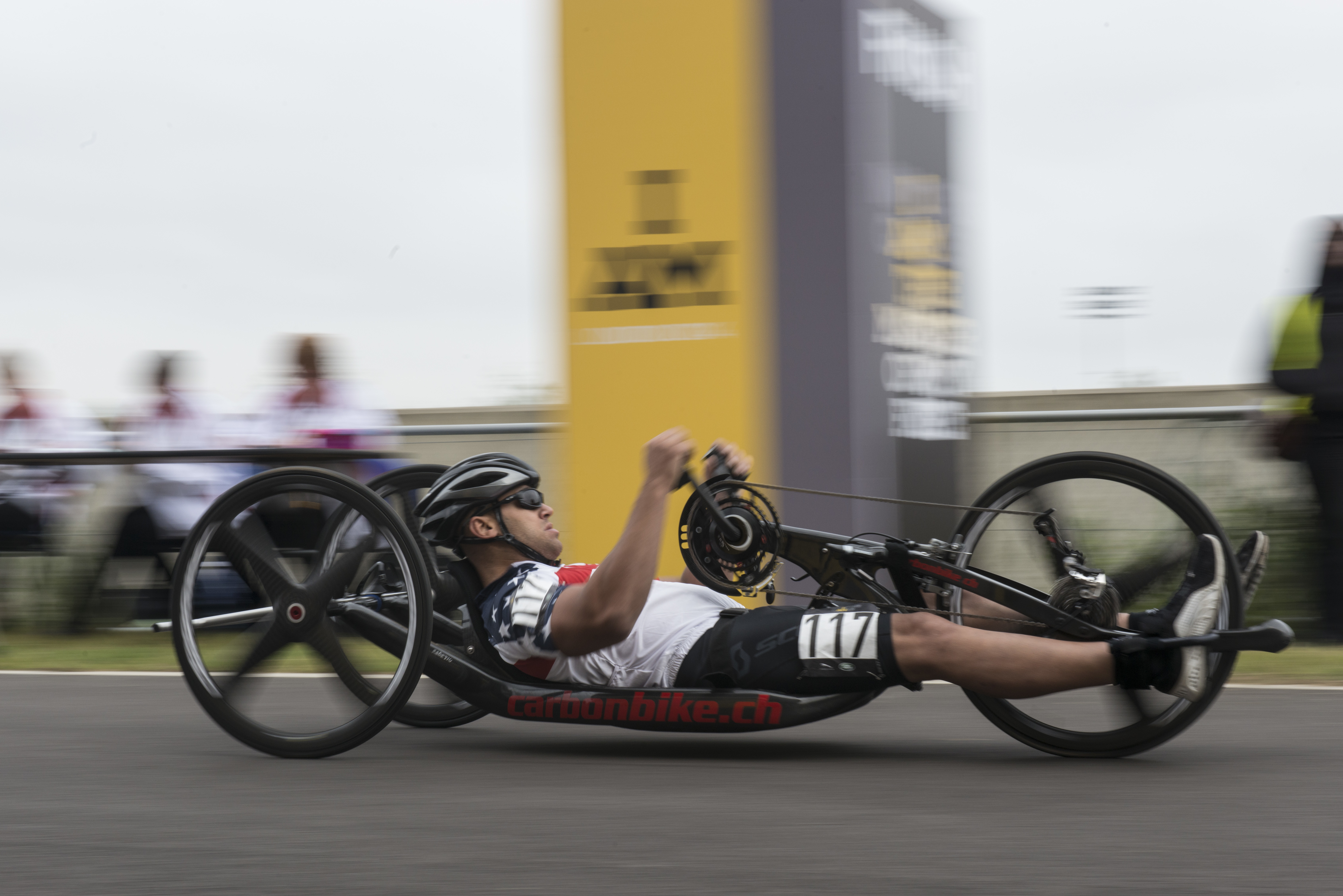
Radetic, 2014 Invictus Games

Radetic's performance at Paralympic-style sports led him to the 2014 and 2016 Invictus Games. He competed in the swimming and cycling races. At the London 2014 games, Radetic won silver medals in Road Cycling during the Men's Circuit Race 5 - Hand Bike and Men's Time Trial 5 - Hand Bike - IHB1. During the 2016 Orlando games, he placed fifth in the IHB1 Men's Hand Bike Race. In the swimming competition, Men's 100 LC Meter Freestyle ISB, Radetic placed seventh. During the event, Radetic's two children, Ana-Maria Radetic and Vinko Radetic, met Prince Harry, Duke of Sussex, who founded the Invictus Games and was featured with him on his Christmas Card.

== Athletic achievements and awards ==
- 2020 "Iron Man" title, 1st place, Mark Hahn 300 Iron Man Category
- 2019, 5th rank, P1 Aquax Enduro Pro, 5th rank
- 2018, 8th rank, P1 Aquax Enduro Pro, 8th rank
- 2017, Championship, European Offshore Aquabike World Championships
- 2017, 7th rank, P1 Aquax Enduro Pro, 7th rank
- 2017, 1st place, IJSBA Mark Hahn Cup Iron Man category
- 2017 6th place, Blowsion World Finals, IJSBA, Endurance Runabout
- 2017, Mark Hahn Memorial 300 mi Endurance Race
- 2017, PRO Watercross Tour - 3rd place
- 2016, P1 Aquax Enduro Pro, 29th rank
- 2016, P1 AquaX Race Series - ranked 16 of 46
- 2016, Mark Hahn Memorial 300 mi Endurance Race
- 2016, 2nd place, Russky Grand Prix, Russia
- 2016, King's Cup, Thailand - 9th place
- 2015, P1 AquaX Endurance Race Series - ranked 19 of 46
- 2015, 4th place, IJSBA Jet Rade of Peru, F1 Class
- 2015, P1 Aquax series - Athlete of the Year
- 2015, Mark Hahn Memorial 300 mi Endurance Race
- 2015, IJSBA World Finals
- 2014, Invictus Games, Silver Medal, Road Cycling, Men's Circuit Race 5 - Hand Bike and Men's Time Trial 5 - Hand Bike - IHB1
- 2014, Long Beach to Catalina (LB2CAT) National PWC
- 2014, Offshore Championship - 17th place
- 2014, Manufacturer's stock class - 9th place
- 2014, 18th place, P1 Aqua X Final Season Race, St. Cloud
- 2013, 1st place, U.S. Army Marathon, Texas
- 2013, Never Quit Challenge Key West to New York City
- 2013, Boot Campaign's Faces of Our Freedom

== Honors and recognition ==
In 2018, Lockheed Martin named Radetic as one of three Lockheed Martin Fighting Spirit Scholarship awardees. Through the scholarship, Radetic was selected to attend the Able Flight six-week flight school, which he completed in 13 days. The scholarship presented Radetic with an opportunity to fly again. He received his wings in July 2019.

In 2017, the 1st Warrant Officer Company Iron Warrant Award has been renamed the W01 Anthony Radetic Iron Warrant Award by the U. S. Army. The award honors the soldier that exhibits the most resilience.

== Sponsorships ==
Radetic's partnerships and endorsements include Sea-Doo, XPS, Trailer Valet, JetLift, SOFLETE, Fly Racing, Rock Tape, BlackTip Jetsports, Jet Pilot, MotoWrap, and RIP It Energy.

== Training ==
To remain in shape, Radetic's SOFLETE program incorporates training six days a week with the Exos group, which includes hand-cycling. Radetic's coach is Dr. Ralf Lindschulten.

== Personal life ==
Radetic lives in Abbeville, Alabama, with his wife Danielle who serves as his Team Manager, and two children. An avid volunteer for disabled veteran causes, he is involved with the Wounded Warrior Project, Disabled Sports USA, Americas Fund (Semper Fi Team), Hope for the Warriors, and Paralyzed Veterans of America. Radetic is a peer counselor for the SOCOM Care Coalition. The nonprofit charities for which Radetic races include Warrior Sailing Program, SOF Bionic Warriors, and Operation Second Chance.

In speaking to the U. S. Army about his accomplishments, Radetic said, "In competitive sports, there is an immediate recognition with each accomplishment. I think through competition, I was looking for a way to validate my personal struggle with my disability.
