= Sarah Donohue =

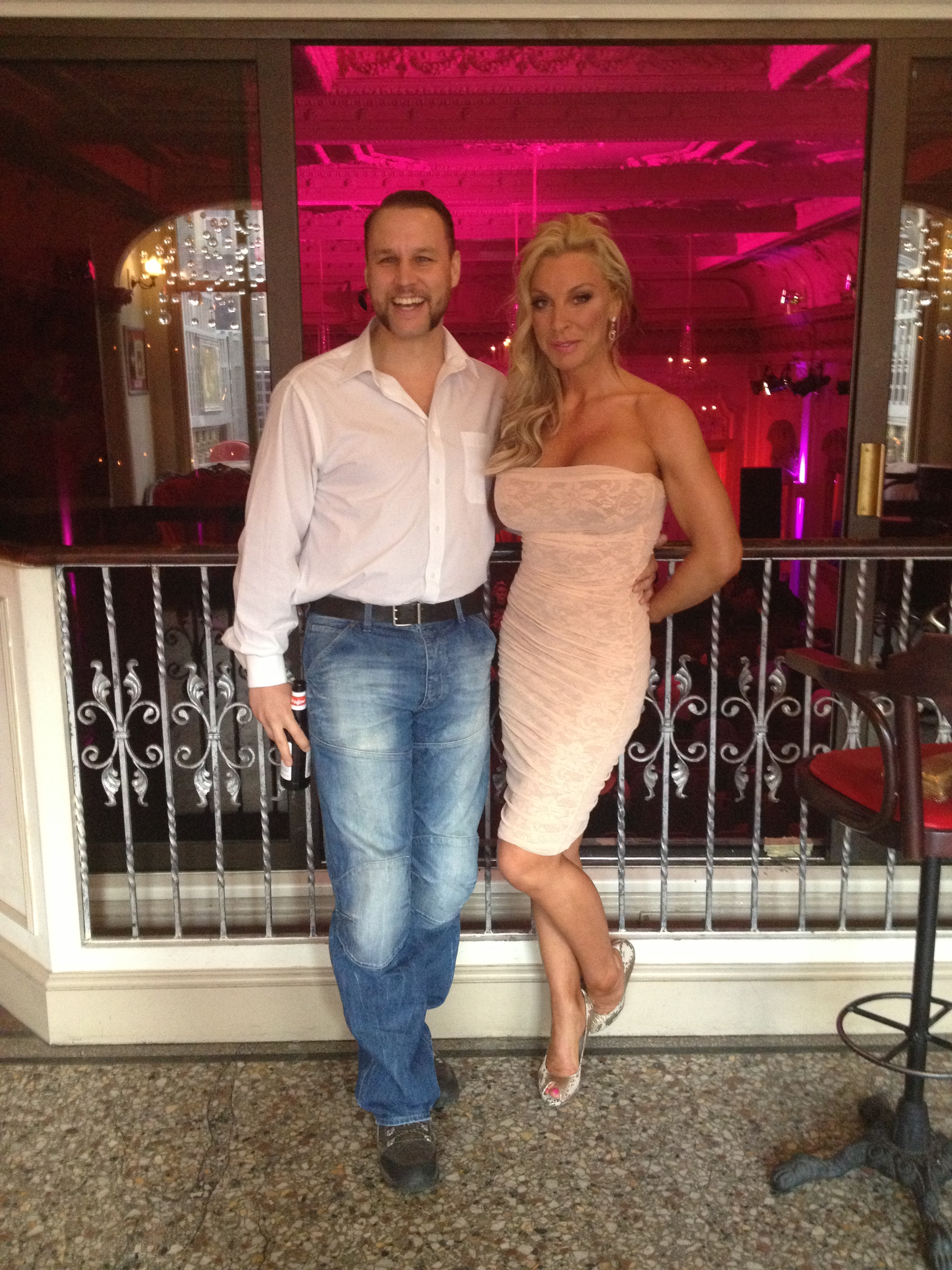
- Donohue and husband Lee Barrett
- Born: 9 August 1970 (age 56)
- Occupations: Model; fitness instructor; television personality; powerboat racer

Sarah Donohue (born 9 August 1970) is an English model, fitness instructor, television personality, and powerboat racer.

== Modelling career ==
Donohue was discovered at age 18 by Debra Burns, the owner of Boss Model Management in Manchester.

Her first modelling job was for JCB in the summer of 1988 and she went on to feature as the cover girl for the Marks & Spencer Autumn Wear collection 1989, Bizarre Magazine., and STUNT Magazine.

== Film and television ==
Donohue has worked with 2nd Unit stunts on the movies, The World Is Not Enough and The Tourist (2010 film). She has appeared on television including, Men and Motors, Top Gear Waterworld, and Come Dine with Me.

== Powerboat Racing ==
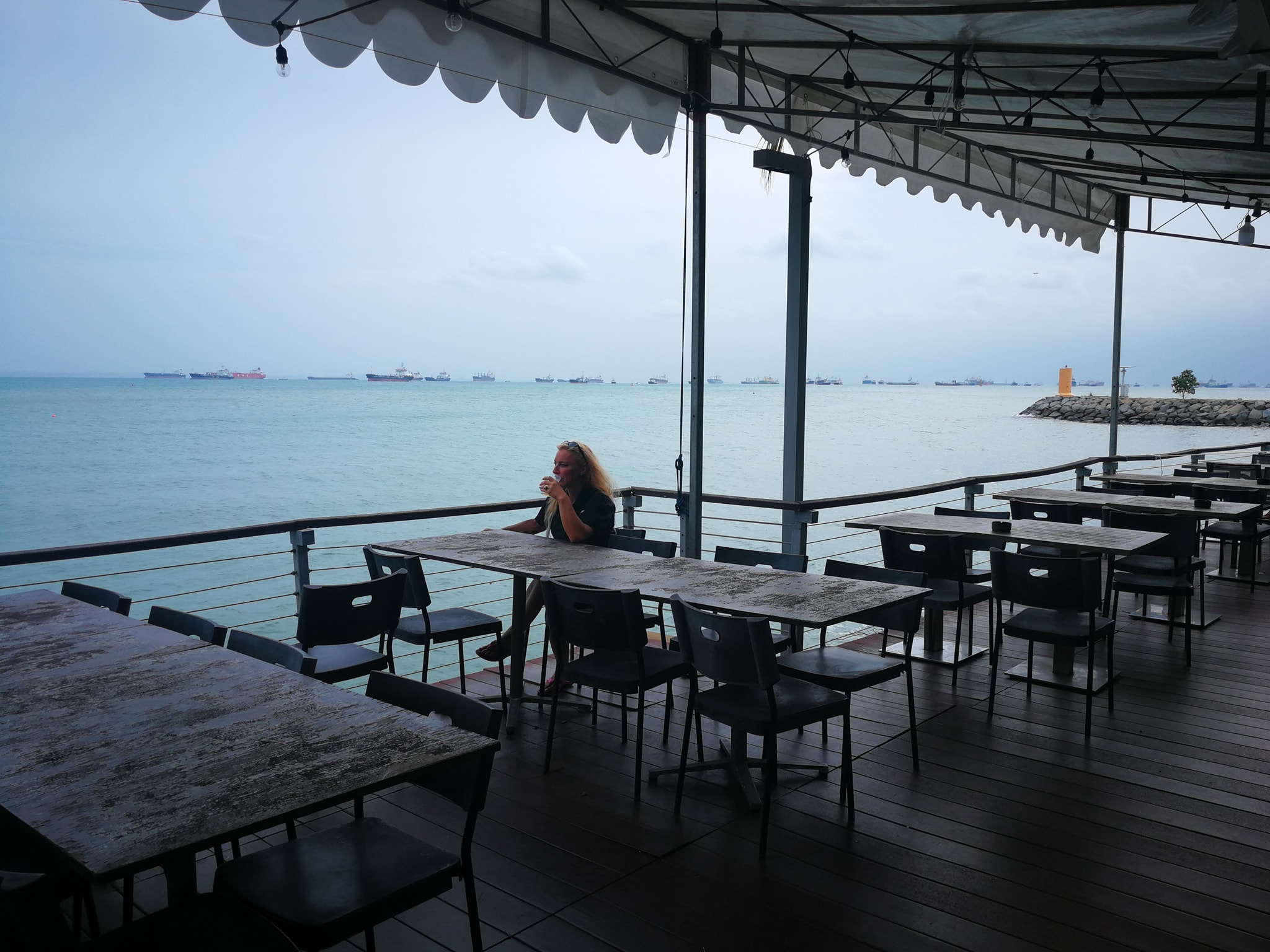

In 1992 Donohue was hired by Texan billionaire Charles Burnett III as his promotion girl for his offshore powerboat racing team, Vulture Ventures.

In 1999 she had a near fatal racing crash.

After a long recovery process Donohue returned to racing and won the Union Internationale Motonautique Class 3C European Championship in Venice, Italy.
