= Verve Cup =

Yacht competition

The Verve Cup Regatta is an annual sailing competition, held over three days, and taking place on three racing circles in Lake Michigan with the Chicago skyline as a backdrop. The competition includes offshore and inshore courses, as well as a new distance race added in 2010. Established in 1992 by the Chicago Yacht Club, in 2010, it became the largest offshore course race regatta in North America. The Verve is a highlight of the sailing season in the Midwest U.S.

One of the only major offshore regattas held in the U.S. during the month of August, the Verve Cup has had national and international sailing competitors. The Verve annually attracts 250–300 yachts to Chicago's Chicago lakefront, with sizes ranging from 25 feet up to 80 feet in length and sailing crews of 4 to 20 persons. The 2011 race is scheduled for August 18–21, which coincides with Chicago's Air & Water Show.

Competitors participate in multiple races, and boats sail either with a rating handicap or a single design so that boats of different sizes and characters can compete against one another in one of the 18+ racing sections. Overall prizes are awarded to the top finishers in each section, with one offshore boat winning the perpetual Verve Cup Trophy. The Verve Cup trophy dates from the late 19th century and is Chicago Yacht Club's oldest sterling silver trophy. Overall prizes are awarded for each class of sailboat. Participants partake off three days of racing, followed by food, entertainment, and camaraderie. The regatta is organized by a volunteer committee.

The Verve Cup series also includes the most popular inshore regatta in Chicago held on the following weekend in August. Identical One-Design classes compete for two days to determine which boat has the best skipper and crew. A range of fleets compete including Etchells, Shields, Luders 16, Rhodes 19, Solings, and J-24 keelboat classes, as the race requires just five boats to be registered in a class to participate, so fleets are mobilized for racing.

== The Winner's Trophy ==
In the spring of 1884, the "Scotch cutter" Verve was brought to Chicago by Commodore E.W. Ayer. She had been built by G.L. Watson on the River Clyde in Scotland, an area famous for its contribution to yachting and the home of many notable designers and yachtbuilders. The Verve was already a champion upon arrival to the Great Lakes as she "won 16 races in the last yar". She was a typical plank-on-edge cutter of the time; 45 feet overall, 38.7 feet on the water, a 7.6 foot draft, a 3.0 foot freeboard, and 6 feet of headroom in the cabin. On July 12, 1884, in the Annual Regatta of the Chicago Yacht Club she won the "second" (smaller) class and beat all of the boats in the first class on corrected time. Her prize was "a silver cup, value $125". This cup was returned to the Chicago Yacht Club in 1964 and placed in service when a two-day regatta for the Offshore Fleet commenced in 1992.

The 2011 winner of the Verve Cup Trophy was Winnebago, a T-10 skippered by Tim Rathbun of Joliet, IL.

== 2011 Race Results ==
Offshore Regatta

Inshore Regatta
