= Emma Kimiläinen =

Finnish racing driver (born 1989)

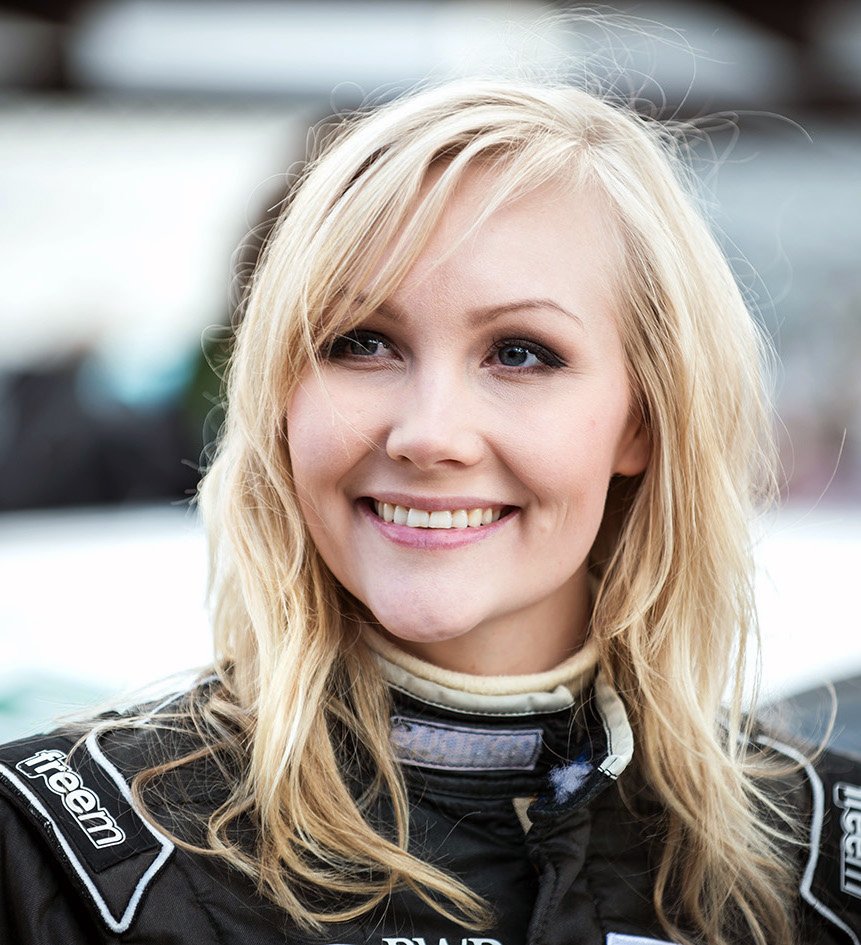
- Kimiläinen in 2018
- Nationality: (Finland) Finnish
- Born: Emma Elina Kimiläinen; 8 July 1989 (age 37) Helsinki, Finland

W Series career
- Debut season: 2019
- Current team: Puma W Series Team
- Categorisation: FIA Silver
- Car number: 7
- Starts: 12
- Wins: 2
- Podiums: 7
- Poles: 2
- Fastest laps: 4
- Best finish: 3rd in 2021

Previous series
- 2005–06 2007 2008 2009 2014–16 2017–18: Formula Ford NEZ; Radical Cup Sweden; ADAC Formula Masters; Formula Palmer Audi; Scandinavian Touring Car Championship; V8 ThunderCars Sweden

Championship titles
- 2024, 2025: E1 Series

Emma Elina Kimiläinen (born 8 July 1989) is a Finnish racing driver. She currently competes in the E1 Series for Team Brady and formerly competed in the W Series.

== Biography ==
=== Motorsport ===
Kimiläinen entered professional motor racing in 2005, competing in the Northern European Formula Ford Championship. She was fifth in her first season, scoring a string of rookie awards along the way, and was tied on points with series champion Sami Isohella in 2006 however finished second on count-back (four wins to Isohella's five). She remained in Northern Europe in 2007, racing Radicals in Sweden.

Audi then picked up Kimiläinen in 2008, and placed her in their Formula Masters series. Team-mate to future Formula One driver Kevin Magnussen, she finished tenth in the standings with a highlight of second at Assen; however Audi cut back her funding after the 2008 financial crisis and she ended up funding her own way into Formula Palmer Audi in 2009. She ended the season fifth in the standings with four podium finishes. However, with no more support from Audi and a lack of personal funds to maintain her racing career, she took an indefinite hiatus from motorsport and started a family after 2009. Kimiläinen had been in contact with an Indy Lights team for 2010, however this was abandoned after it was revealed a team sponsor wanted her to produce adult content for them.

In 2014, Kimiläinen received a surprise call-up from PWR Racing to complete the full Scandinavian Touring Car Championship season, making her the first woman to race in the STCC since Nettan Lindgren-Jansson in 1999. She was retained for 2015 and 2016, however injury prevented her from completing the full 2016 season following a crash in the opening round at Skövde in which she strained her neck. She switched to the Swedish V8 ThunderCar series for 2017, before announcing plans to compete in the Electric GT Championship – which was subsequently delayed and then later cancelled altogether.

Kimiläinen competed in the W Series for 2019 as one of the seasons' 18 permanent drivers. She qualified well for the opening round at the Hockenheimring, however was involved in a crash with Megan Gilkes that re-ignited her neck injury and forced her out of the following two rounds. She finished fifth on her return at the Norisring and followed that with a grand slam (pole position, fastest lap, race win) at Assen. She would finish second in a race-long fight with Alice Powell in the series finale at Brands Hatch, enabling her to leapfrog Fabienne Wohlwend for fifth in the championship. Following a coronavirus-induced break from racing in 2020, Kimiläinen returned to W Series in 2021 and finished third in the championship with a win at Spa and four other podiums. In 2022 she participated in the Race of Champions replacing Valtteri Bottas who was to race but did not due to an agreement with Alfa Romeo F1 Team so Kimiläinen raced alongside Mika Häkkinen

In 2024, Kimiläinen competed in the UIM E1 World Championship, an electric boat racing series. Kimiläinen is a member of Team Brady, owned by retired American football player Tom Brady. Her teammate was powerboat racer Sam Coleman.

=== Personal life ===
Alongside her racing, Kimiläinen works as a radio and television host – most notably producing Finland's Worst Driver for MTV3. She has also appeared on the Finnish versions of Dancing with the Stars and The Masked Singer.

Kimiläinen is (2022) in a relationship with former Finnish footballer Sami Hyypiä, some 16 years her senior.

== Racing record ==
=== Career summary ===
| Season | Series | Team | Races | Wins | Poles | F/Laps | Podiums | Points | Position |
|---|---|---|---|---|---|---|---|---|---|
| 2005 | Formula Ford NEZ | Team F40 | 9 | 0 | 1 | 1 | 2 | 77 | 5th |
| 2005 | Formula Ford Finland | Team F40 | 10 | 0 | 1 | 0 | 5 | 106 | **2nd** |
| 2005 | Formula Ford Sweden | Team F40 | 4 | 0 | 0 | 0 | 1 | 38 | 7th |
| 2006 | Formula Ford NEZ | Team F40 | 14 | 4 | 2 | 0 | 9 | 139 | **2nd** |
| 2006 | Formula Ford Finland | Team F40 | 4 | 0 | 0 | 0 | 1 | 110 | **2nd** |
| 2006 | Formula Ford Sweden | Team F40 | 4 | 0 | 0 | 0 | 0 | 48 | 6th |
| 2007 | Radical Cup Sweden | JFG Motorsport | 22 | 3 | 4 | 0 | 14 | 195 | **3rd** |
| 2008 | ADAC Formel Masters | Van Amersfoort Racing | 16 | 0 | 0 | 1 | 1 | 76 | 10th |
| 2009 | Formula Palmer Audi | MotorSport Vision | 20 | 0 | 0 | 1 | 4 | 260 | 5th |
| 2014 | Scandinavian Touring Car Championship | PWR Racing Team | 11 | 0 | 0 | 0 | 1 | 55 | 11th |
| 2015 | Scandinavian Touring Car Championship | PWR Racing Team | 14 | 0 | 0 | 0 | 2 | 158 | 7th |
| 2016 | Scandinavian Touring Car Championship | PWR Racing – SEAT Dealer Team | 8 | 0 | 0 | 1 | 0 | 59 | 11th |
| 2017 | V8 ThunderCars NEZ | N/A | 6 | 2 | 0 | 0 | 4 | 2400 | 5th |
| 2019 | W Series | Hitech GP | 4 | 1 | 1 | 3 | 2 | 53 | 5th |
| 2021 | W Series | Écurie W | 8 | 1 | 1 | 1 | 5 | 108 | **3rd** |
| 2022 | W Series | Puma W Series Team | 7 | 0 | 0 | 1 | 1 | 42 | 8th |
| 2024 | E1 Series | Team Brady | 4 | 3 | 0 | 2 | 3 | 63* | **1st*** |

=== Complete Scandinavian Touring Car Championship results ===
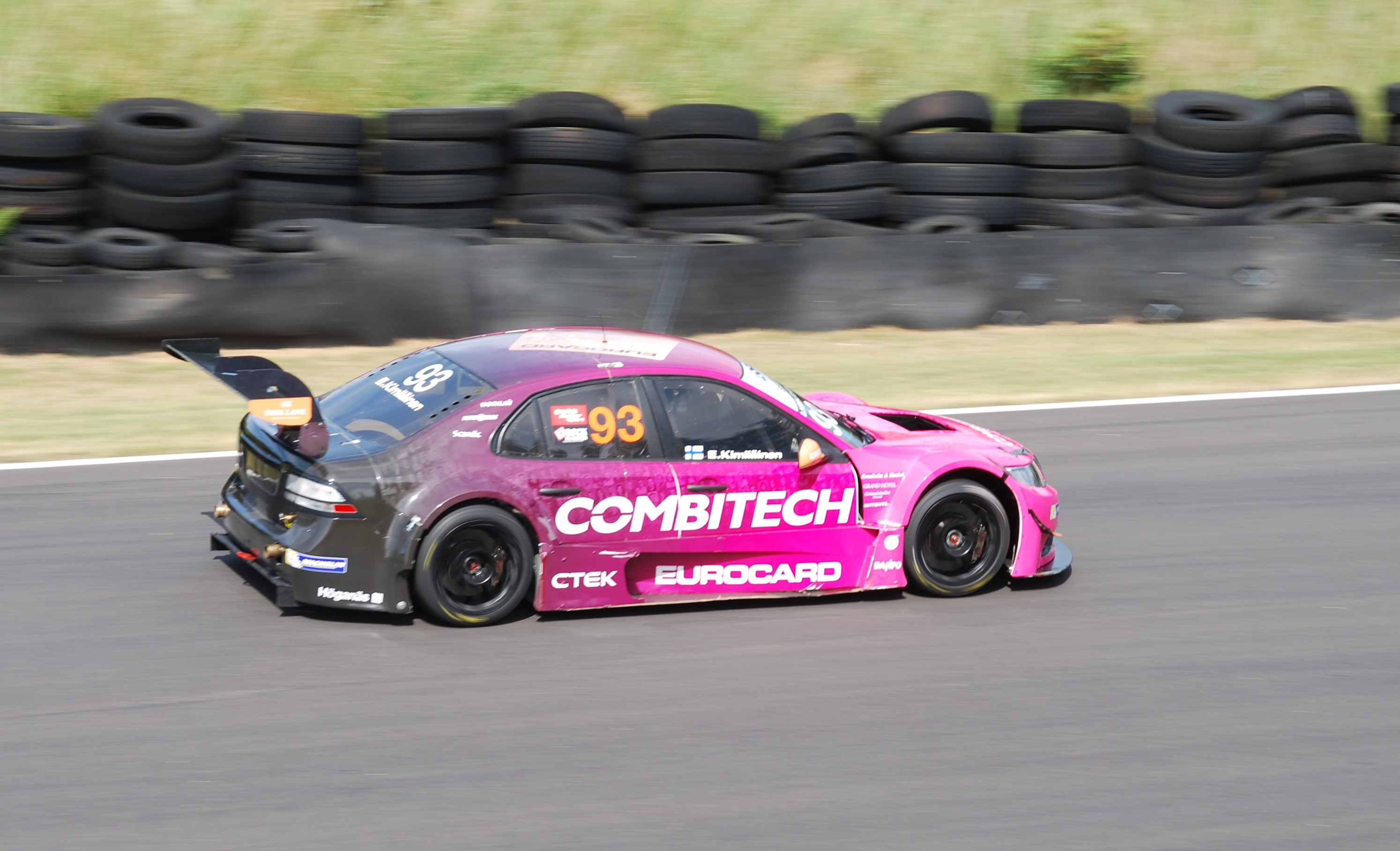
Kimiläinen at the Falkenberg round of the 2015 Scandinavian Touring Car Championship.

(key) (Races in bold indicate pole position) (Races in italics indicate fastest lap)

| Year | Team | Car | 1 | 2 | 3 | 4 | 5 | 6 | 7 | 8 | 9 | 10 | 11 | 12 | 13 | 14 | DC | Points |
|---|---|---|---|---|---|---|---|---|---|---|---|---|---|---|---|---|---|---|
| 2014 | PWR Racing | Saab 9-3 TTA | KNU; 1 Ret | KNU; 2; 9 | GÖT; 1 Ret | GÖT; 2 DNS | FAL; 1; 2 | FAL; 2; 11 | KNU; 1; 6 | KNU; 2; 7 | SOL; 1 Ret | SOL; 2; 11 | MAN; 1; 10 | MAN; 2; 9 | | | 11th | 55 |
| 2015 | PWR Racing Team | Saab 9-3 TTA | VRS; 1; 6 | VRS; 2 Ret | AND; 1; 5 | AND; 2; 3 | MAN; 1; 7 | MAN; 2; 3 | FAL; 1; 9 | FAL; 2; 9 | KAR; 1; 7 | KAR; 2; 10 | SOL; 1; 5 | SOL; 2; 4 | KNU; 1; 4 | KNU; 2; 6 | 7th | 158 |
| 2016 | PWR Racing - SEAT Dealer Team | SEAT León STCC | SKÖ; 1 Ret | SKÖ; 2 Ret | MAN; 1 | MAN; 2 | AND; 1; 8 | AND; 2; 6 | FAL; 1; 6 | FAL; 2 Ret | KAR; 1; 7 | KAR; 2 Ret | SOL; 1 | SOL; 2 | KNU; 1 | KNU; 2 | 11th | 59 |

=== Complete W Series results ===
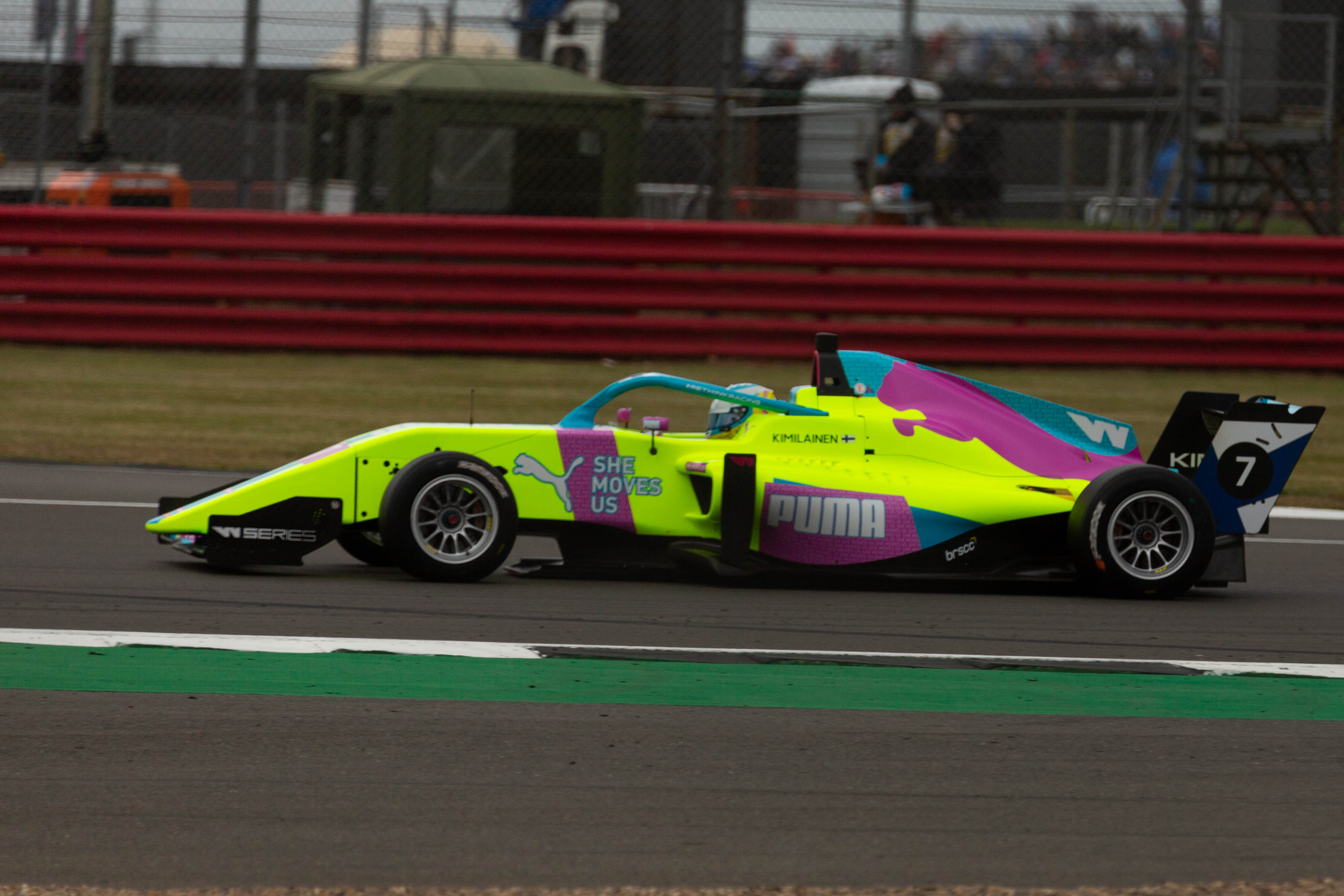
Kimiläinen at the 2022 W Series Silverstone round.

(key) (Races in bold indicate pole position) (Races in italics indicate fastest lap)

| Year | Team | 1 | 2 | 3 | 4 | 5 | 6 | 7 | 8 | DC | Points |
|---|---|---|---|---|---|---|---|---|---|---|---|
| 2019 | Hitech GP | HOC; Ret | ZOL; WD | MIS | NOR; 5 | **ASS**; 1 | BRH; 2 | | | 5th | 53 |
| 2021 | Écurie W | RBR1; 13 | RBR2; 3 | SIL; 4 | HUN; 6 | SPA; 1 | **ZAN**; 3 | COA1; 2 | COA2; 3 | 3rd | 108 |
| 2022 | Puma W Series Team | MIA1; 15 | MIA2; 5 | CAT; 4 | SIL; 2 | LEC; 12 | HUN; Ret | SGP; 9 | | 8th | 42 |
