= Powerboat South Africa =

- Sport: Powerboating
- Jurisdiction: South Africa
- Abbreviation: PSA
- Affiliation: Union Internationale Motonautique
- Headquarters: Sasolburg
- Location: 29 Golden Gate Boulevard, Vaalpark 1948
- President: Christopher de Jager
- Secretary: Christopher De Jager

Official website
- www.powerboat.co.za
- (South Africa)

Powerboat South Africa (PSA) is a racing association for powerboats in South Africa. It is recognised as the sanctioning authority by the Union Internationale Motonautique (UIM), the world body for powerboating. It is the governing body of the sport in South Africa as recognised by SASCOC.

Powerboat South Africa organises national competition in both men's and women's category, as well as juniors. PSA also sends representative teams to compete at international competitions across various disciplines.

== History ==
South African Power Boat Association (SAPBA) was established in the 1940s, for the purpose of administration, promotion and protection of the sport of powerboating in South Africa. SAPBA later changed to PSA and was involved a court battle that lasted for three years with Powerboat Racing South Africa (PBRSA) over the control of the sport. The issue was resolved in favour of PSA in 2011.

== Notable drivers ==
Some of the notable South African powerboat racing pilots include Peter Lindenberg and Tinus van der Merwe.

== See also ==
- Sport in South Africa
