= E1 Series (boat racing) =

Electric boat racing series

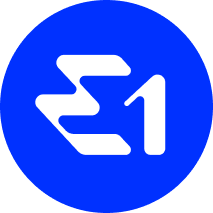
- Category: Electric powerboat racing
- Country: International
- Inaugural season: 2024
- Drivers: 18
- Teams: 9
- Drivers' champion: (Finland) Emma Kimiläinen (United Kingdom) Sam Coleman
- Teams' champion: (United States) Team Brady
- Official website: e1series.com

The UIM E1 Series is a Union Internationale Motonautique-sanctioned, all-electric international offshore powerboat racing series.

The first season began with the E1 Jeddah GP in Saudi Arabia in February 2024.

== History ==
=== Creation ===
The E1 Series began in early 2020 as a project created by Rodi Basso, former Formula One engineer and McLaren Applied business director, and Alejandro Agag, founder of Formula E and Extreme E. After coming up with the initial idea, the duo approached Sophi Horne to design the race boat. Horne had previously been focused on electric leisure boats.

The series was announced at the Monaco Yacht Club on September 25, 2020. The boat was unveiled in June of 2021, alongside the announcement of a partnership with Saudi Arabia’s Public Investment Fund.

=== Testing ===
On April 21, 2022, the RaceBird took to the water for the first time, piloted by former powerboat champion Luca Ferrari. The prototype completed a series of tests and performance runs on the River Po in Italy.

In June 2022, the boat was exhibited on the water at the Venice Boat Show, with model Cara Delevingne assisting with the launch. In September 2022, the series raced in front of an audience for the first time, with Sam Coleman piloting the RaceBird at the World Port Days in Rotterdam.

The series returned to the World Port Days in September 2023, marking the first time four RaceBirds were in the water at the same time. Coleman was joined by Ieve Millere-Hagin, Gianluca Carli, and Oban Duncan to compete in a series of races, with Duncan emerging as the champion.

=== 2024 season ===
The inaugural season consists of 9 teams and 18 pilots. It began in February in Jeddah, and was won by Team Brady.

=== 2025 season ===
The second season began in January in Jeddah which marked the debut of a new team led by LeBron James. There were seven races in season 2 and the overall championship was once again won by Team Brady.

== Race format ==
A race weekend consists of free practice and qualifying on the first day, while group races, a race-off, place race, and finals all take place on the second day. The pilots alternate driving duties for each session.

Each race is 6 laps long, which includes a mandatory short lap and long lap, which can be taken at any point during the race. The course boundaries are marked by electronic anchorless buoys known as SmartMarks, which are much less invasive than traditional buoys.

== Blue Impact championship ==
The Blue Impact championship is being trialed during the inaugural season, and will fully roll out during the 2025 season. It will see the teams competing to become the E1 Impact Champion, by working towards a better future through activism such as aquatic conservation and restoration programs and marine habitat research. At the end of the season, fans and an expert jury will vote for the champion.

The winners of the inaugural Blue Impact Championship were Team Brady

== Boat ==
The RaceBird is an all-electric hydrofoil boat. It is 7.5m long, with carbon fibre hydrofoils which raise the boat when it reaches a speed of 17 knots. The RaceBird has a 150kW electric motor and a battery capacity of 35kWh. It can reach a top speed of 50 knots (58 MPH/93 KPH). The cockpit is designed for one pilot, with a steering wheel and pedals like a single-seater race car.

Designed by SeaBird Technologies, the RaceBird is manufactured by Victory Marine, with an electric powertrain developed by Mercury Racing, and rechargeable batteries from Kreisel Electric. E1 is currently a spec-series, which means all the teams are running the same boats. However, the goal is to move towards teams designing their own vehicle in future years.

== Teams and pilots ==
The series was originally designed to have teams representing various cities and countries around the world, with the Venice Racing Team being the first team to join. However, as the series continued its development, the teams instead moved towards celebrity owners like Tom Brady, Will Smith, Virat Kohli and Rafael Nadal. There are currently nine teams competing in the championship, but the goal is to have up to twelve.

Similar to Extreme E, E1 regulations require each team to select a male and female pilot, who share equal driving duties. The UIM E1 Pilot Academy was created to train a new generation of racers to compete in the E1 Series. Female and male athletes with experience in motorsport, cycling, Esports, extreme sports and high-speed sports were invited to apply. A total of 34 racers took part in the training in 2023, with 18 being selected to compete in the inaugural season of the series. On October 1, 2024, it was announced that the Monaco Yacht Club would be partnering with the Pilot Academy for 2025.

== Race locations ==
The inaugural season saw locations that were relatively close to each other, in order to limit the carbon footprint of the series. There is expected to be up to fifteen race locations as the series continues to expand.

Location	Years
(Saudi Arabia) Jeddah	2024–present
(Italy) Venice	2024
(Spain) Puerto Banús	2024
Monaco	2024–present
(Italy) Lake Como	2024, 2026
(Qatar) Doha	2025
(Croatia) Dubrovnik	2025–present
(Italy) Lake Maggiore	2025
(Nigeria) Lagos	2025–present
(United States) Miami	2025–present
(The Bahamas) Bahamas	2026

== See also ==
- Electric motorsport
- Formula E
- Extreme E
- Extreme H
- Tom Brady
