= Formula 4S Powerboat World Championship =

Powerboat racing competition

The Formula-4s Powerboat World Championship is an international inshore powerboat racing competition for powerboats organised by the Union Internationale Motonautique (UIM), hence it is often referred to as F4s. The "S" letter is an abbreviation of four-stroke, which denotes that four-stroke boat engines are used in this class.

== History ==
This class was designed as an ecological alternative to UIMS750, UIMS550, UIM F4 and UIM F3 classes. Before achieving World Championship status, the class was called SL-60. The first races were held in Scandinavia in 2005. In 2009, this class was chosen as the foundation for the ADAC Masters international series conducted in Germany. In 2010, the class was given its current name F-4s and European Championship status. In 2011, a promotional F-4s series was launched, conducted alongside F1H2O events. The first World Championship in the Formula-4s class was organised in 2013.

=== Formula 1 F4-s World Series ===
The Formula 1 F4-s World Series was established as a promotional youth development series, running alongside F1H2O Grand Prix weekends to create a reserve of young drivers and provide them with opportunities to learn the F1H2O circuits. The series ran from 2010 to 2019. Following the cancellation of the 2020 F1H2O season due to the COVID-19 pandemic, the promotional F4-s series did not resume. The series was subsequently discontinued to reduce additional costs for F1H2O teams.

== Evolution and international series ==
The F-4s class has experienced dynamic growth in powerboat racing. Championship rounds are conducted in various countries, including Hungary, Latvia, Finland, France, Great Britain, Germany, Norway, Sweden and Italy. In addition to the World and European Championships, prestigious international series such as ADAC Masters in Germany are conducted. In 2014, over 50 drivers participated in international series. Numerous open international events are held in different countries, including the United States, China, the United Arab Emirates, and throughout the Baltic and Scandinavian regions.

The class's popularity can be attributed to several factors. Boats in the F-4s class are equipped with safety cockpits derived from the senior classes F1H2O and F2H2O. To date, no fatalities or serious injuries amongst drivers in this class have been recorded. The class offers an affordable entry point with lower costs compared to other Formula classes such as F1, F2 and F500, whilst maintaining performance rates in assembly and tuning-up that approach the senior classes. Several weeks of intensive work by highly skilled mechanics are required, typically conducted by shipyards or racing clubs with proper equipment.

The F-4s class provides one of the most direct pathways to the premier F1H2O championship. It is amongst the few classes that grants eligibility to apply for a super-licence after obtaining appropriate experience (eight races according to UIM regulations). F-4s boats feature steering characteristics similar to the senior classes, adjusted for speed, making the class invaluable training for drivers. This has been demonstrated by successful transitions of young drivers into F1 and F2 classes.

== Boats ==
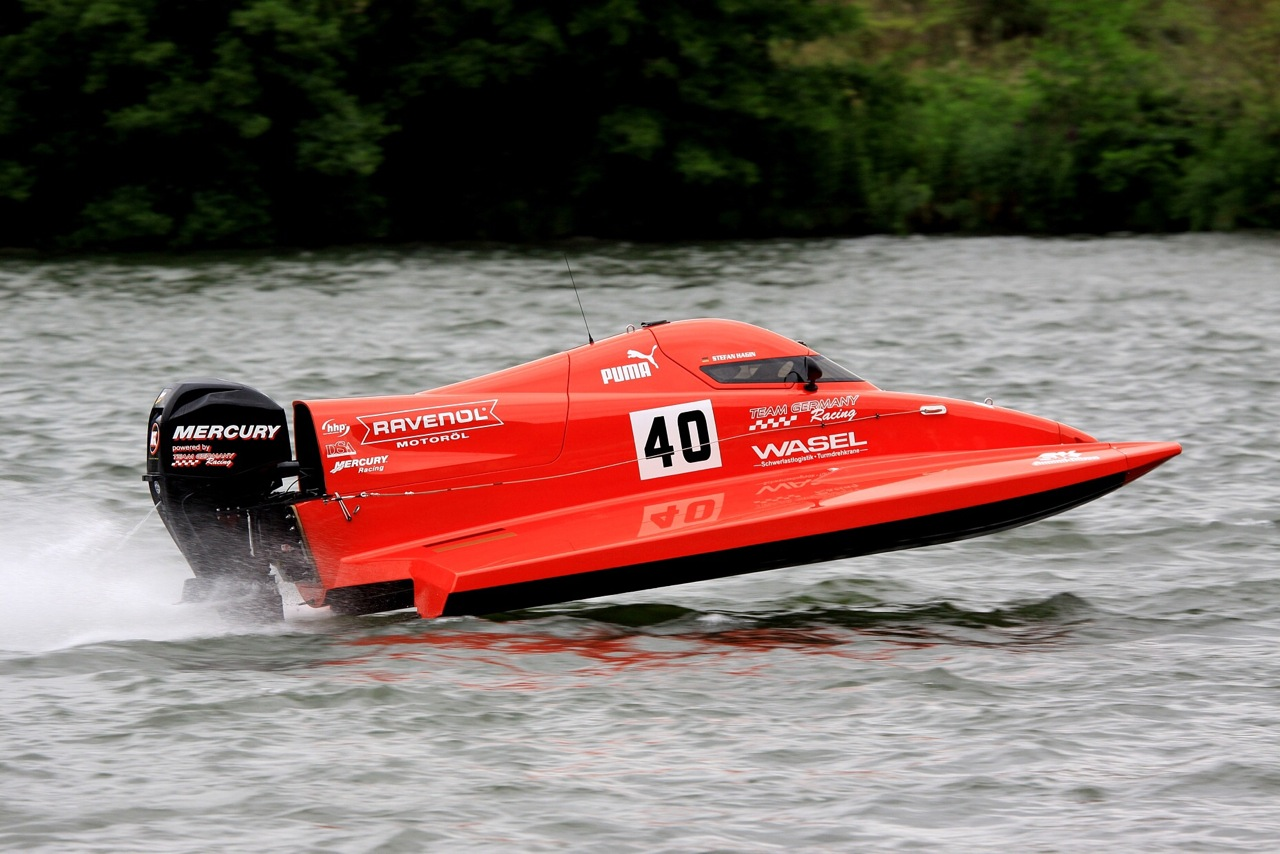
Molgaard F-4s Gen3

Boats in the F-4s class are tunnel catamarans. Construction technologies mirror those used in the senior classes. The latest technology and modern materials, including carbon fibre, Kevlar, Nomex and advanced polymer resins, are employed in boat construction. The costs of materials and skilled labour are substantial, comparable to other Formula classes, due to the requirements for high performance and enhanced safety.

Modern F-4s boats, like their senior counterparts, are equipped with 3000N/sm² safety cockpits. Racing speeds with the Mercury APX 60 engine can exceed 120 km/h.

Many companies and private boat builders in Europe, the United States and China produce boats for this class. Leading manufacturers include BABA Racing (Italy), ASV (Hungary), Molgaard Racing (Denmark) and Lönnberg (Finland).

== Engines ==
According to UIM regulations, the four-stroke Mercury 60 EFI Racing and Mercury 60 APX are the only engines permitted for this class.

Engine specifications:
Power: 60PS
Capacity: 995cc
Number of cylinders: 4
Weight: 118 kg

== Format ==
Rounds of the World and European championships are conducted on circuits homologated by the UIM. The number of boats in a heat must not exceed the capacity specified in the race course homologation. Participants in the main heats are selected through qualification. The maximum straight length is 600m. Races are run anticlockwise. There are a minimum of two heats, with typically three or four contested. Drivers are scored for each heat according to UIM regulations. The winner is determined by the sum of points accumulated.

== Recent developments ==
=== 2025 season ===
The 2025 UIM F4 World Championship comprised two rounds held in Mons, Belgium (24-25 August) and Viverone, Italy (12-14 September). The opening round in Mons attracted 29 drivers competing for the world title. William Leithe-Martinsen of Norway won the Saturday race, whilst Latvia's Nils Slakteris claimed victory in Sunday's race. The championship concluded at Lake Viverone, where Slakteris secured the 2025 World Championship title.

=== Safety developments ===
In October 2025, the UIM Council voted on comprehensive safety upgrades for F4 boats manufactured after 1 January 2026. The proposals included mandatory crash boxes constructed from multi-layer foam capable of absorbing 1.2 kilojoules during drop tests to reduce driver injuries in lateral collisions. Additional requirements included rear-mounted balloon airbags with delayed activation and an increase in minimum weight from 360 kilograms to 370 kilograms.

The crash box specifications mandate construction measuring 60 to 80 millimetres thickness with at least three foam layers and intermediate skins. Ramasco Yacht Design developed the crash box solution based on Formula 1 technologies originally designed by ISATEC. The proposals were reviewed by the Safety Cockpit Committee, Formulae Committee, COMINSPORT, COMINTECH and COMINSAFE before submission to the UIM Council at the 98th General Assembly on 10 October 2025.

== Champions ==
=== UIM F4 World Champions ===
Season	Gold	Silver	Bronze
2025	(Latvia) SLAKTERIS, Nils	(Norway) MARTINSEN, William Leithe	(France) BAPTISTE-THOMAS, Jean
2024	(Norway) SOLVANG, André	(France) BAPTISTE-THOMAS, Jean	(Sweden) WIBERG, Hilmer
2023	(Finland) VILMUNEN, Jarno	(Norway) SOLVANG, André	(Lithuania) STAINYS, Paulius
2022	(Estonia) ARAND, Stefan	(Finland) VIRTANEN, Roope	(Sweden) WIBERG, Mathilda
2021	(Finland) REINIKAINEN, Sami	(Estonia) ARAND, Stefan	(Finland) LINDHOLM, Alexander
2020	(Finland) LINDHOLM, Alexander	(Finland) WECKSTRÖM, Alec	(Finland) VIRTANEN, Roope
2019	(Finland) LEHTONEN, Tuukka	(Latvia) LIJCS, Nikita	(Finland) LINDHOLM, Alexander
2018	(Sweden) JERNFAST, Morgan	(Latvia) LIJCS, Nikita	(Finland) LEHTONEN, Tuukka
2017	(Finland) MANNINEN, Juho-Matti	(Latvia) LIJCS, Nikita	(Finland) VIIPPO, Kalle
2016	(Finland) MANNINEN, Juho-Matti	(Latvia) LIJCS, Nikita	(Finland) VIIPPO, Kalle
2015	(Italy) COMPARATO, Alberto	(Finland) LINDSTRÖM, Risto	(Finland) NYHOLM, Anton
2014	(Italy) COMPARATO, Alberto	(Latvia) LIJCS, Nikita	(Poland) MANIEWSKI, Adrian
2013	(Hungary) TABORI, Aron	(Poland) MANIEWSKI, Adrian	(Lithuania) RIABKO, Edgars
2012	(Sweden) SÖDERLING, Tobias	(Poland) MANIEWSKI, Adrian	(Lithuania) RIABKO, Edgars
2011	(Latvia) MOROZS, Mārtiņš	(Sweden) SAMUELSSON, Oskar	(Poland) MANIEWSKI, Adrian
2010	(Sweden) SPARRING, Daniel	(Poland) PRZYBYL, Ada	(Germany) SCHELLER, Alexander
2009	(Germany) HAGIN, Stefan	(Sweden) SAMUELSSON, Oskar	(Germany) GIMPL, Norbert
2008	(Sweden) SPARRING, Daniel	(Sweden) SAMUELSSON, Oskar	(Germany) GIMPL, Norbert

=== Formula 1 F4-s World Series ===
Season	Winner	Runner-up	Third place
2020-2024	No championship held		
2019	(Germany) STILZ, Max	(United Kingdom) SMITH, Harvey	(United Arab Emirates) AL MEHAIRBI, Mohammed
2018	(France) CHIAPPE, Tom	(Germany) STILZ, Max	(United Kingdom) WHITTLE, Sam
2017	(United Arab Emirates) AL MANSOORI, Mansoor	(France) BRISSET, Jeremy	(United Arab Emirates) AL MEHAIRBI, Mohammed
2016	(United Arab Emirates) AL QAMZI, Rashed	(Netherlands) ZANDBERGEN, Ferdinand	(France) BRISSET, Jeremy
2015	(Germany) SZYMURA, Mike	(Finland) NYHOLM, Anton	(Norway) HALVORSEN, Joakim
2014	(Germany) SZYMURA, Mike	(Australia) BRINEY, Rigby	(Qatar) AL KUWARI, Khalid
2013	(Germany) SZYMURA, Mike	(Sweden) FRIBERG, Nicklas	(China) WU, Bincheng
2012	(Sweden) FORSS, Jesper	(United Kingdom) PALFREYMAN, Matthew	(Norway) MUNTHE-KAAS, Tobias
2011	(United Kingdom) PALFREYMAN, Matthew	(Sweden) SJÖHOLM, Bimba	(Qatar) AL SHAMLAN, Khalid
2010	(Sweden) SAMUELSSON, Oskar	(Finland) ROMS, Filip	(Germany) HAGIN, Stefan

=== UIM F4 European Champions ===
Season	Gold	Silver	Bronze
2024	(Norway) SOLVANG, André	(Latvia) SLAKTERIS, Nils	(Finland) LEHTO, Tino
2023	(Finland) VILMUNEN, Jarno	(Norway) SOLVANG, André	(Sweden) WIBERG, Hilmer
2022	(Estonia) ARAND, Stefan	(Norway) SOLVANG, André	(Latvia) LIJCS, Nikita
2021	No championship held		
2020	No championship held		
2019	(Finland) LEHTONEN, Tuukka	(Hungary) TABORI, Aron	(Hungary) HORWARTH, Attila
2018	(Sweden) JERNFAST, Morgan	(Finland) LEHTONEN, Tuukka	(United Kingdom) JELF, Ben
2017	(France) REVERT, Rudy	(Finland) MANNINEN, Juho-Matti	(United Kingdom) JELF, Ben
2016	(Finland) MANNINEN, Juho-Matti	(Finland) SEDERHOLM, Magnus	(United Kingdom) MORSE, Ben
2015	(Finland) MANNINEN, Juho-Matti	(Finland) SEDERHOLM, Magnus	(Latvia) LIJCS, Nikita
2014	(Italy) COMPARATO, Alberto	(Latvia) LIJCS, Nikita	(Poland) MANIEWSKI, Adrian
2013	(Finland) MARTIN, Olle	(Hungary) TABORI, Aron	(Poland) MANIEWSKI, Adrian
2012	(Sweden) SÖDERLING, Tobias	(Germany) SAUERSSING, Manuel	(Lithuania) RIABKO, Edgars
2011	(Germany) SAUERSSING, Manuel	(Latvia) MOROZS, Mārtiņš	(Poland) MANIEWSKI, Adrian
2010	(Germany) HAGIN, Stefan	(Poland) MANIEWSKI, Adrian	(Latvia) MOROZS, Mārtiņš
