= Association of IOC Recognised International Sports Federations =

Nonprofit sports organisation

ARISF
- Association of IOC Recognised International Sports Federations
- Abbreviation: ARISF
- Formation: 1983; 43 years ago
- Type: Nonprofit organisation
- Purpose: Inter-sport federation organisation
- Headquarters: Lausanne, Switzerland
- Secretary General: Riccardo Fraccari
- President: Raffaele Chiulli
- Vice-President: John Liljelund
- Parent organisation: International Olympic Committee
- Website: arisf.sport

The Association of IOC Recognised International Sports Federations (ARISF) is a nonprofit organisation of international sports federations that constituted through and recognised by the International Olympic Committee (IOC). The ARISF's members are recognised by the International Olympic Committee whose sport is currently not competed in either the Summer or Winter Olympics, though becoming a member of ARISF does not imply or guarantee that the sport will be included in future Olympic Games.

Among the aims of ARISF are: act as a spokesperson to defend and coordinate the common interests of its members whilst maintaining their authority, independence and autonomy, determine the consensus of the member federations on questions of common interest in relation to the Olympic Movement and ensure the largest possible participation in the activities of the IOC.

Headquartered in the Swiss city of Lausanne, it was formed in 1983. It is headed by Raffaele Chiulli, who is the president of ARISF.

== ARISF Executive Board ==
The executive board is composed of a president, vice-president, secretary general and three members, all from different sports federations.

Designation	Name	Country	Sports Federation
President	Raffaele Chiulli	Italy	International Powerboating Union
Vice-president	John Liljelund	Finland	International Floorball Federation
Secretary General	Riccardo Fraccari	Italy	World Baseball Softball Confederation
Council Members	Zena Wooldridge	United Kingdom	World Squash
Council Members	Robert "Nob" Rauch	United States	World Flying Disc Federation
Council Members	Anna Arzhanova	Russia	World Underwater Federation

== Members ==
The ARISF's members are recognised by the International Olympic Committee whose sport is currently not competed in either the Summer or Winter Olympics. As of March 2025, 40 governing bodies are members of the ARISF:

Sport	International federation	Acronym	National associations	Year founded	Official website	Notes
Air sports (Note: includes Aerobatics, Air racing, Hot air ballooning, Gliding, Hang gliding & Parachuting)	International Air Sports Federation	FAI	88	1905	fai.org	(Note: Also a member of International World Games Association (IWGA).)
American football (Note: includes Flag football)	International Federation of American Football	IFAF	74	1998	americanfootball.sport	(Note: Also an associate member of Association of Summer Olympic International Federations (ASOIF).)
Automobile sport	International Automobile Federation	FIA	145	1904	fia.com	
Bandy	Federation of International Bandy	FIB	28	1955	worldbandy.com	
Baseball, Baseball5 & Softball	World Baseball Softball Confederation	WBSC	207	2014	wbsc.org	
Basque pelota	International Federation of Basque Pelota	FIPV	33	1929	fipv.net	
Cue sports (Note: includes Carom billiards, Pool & Snooker)	World Confederation of Billiards Sports	WCBS	135	1992	wcbs.sport	
Boxing	World Boxing	WB	111	2023	worldboxing.org	(Note: Provisional member, pending ratification by ARISF general assembly.) (Note: Also a member of Alliance of Independent Recognized Members of Sport (AIMS).)
Boules (Note: includes Pétanque, Bocce volo, Raffa)	World Pétanque and Bowls Federation	WPBF	162	1985	fipjp.org	
Bowling (Note: includes Nine-pin bowling & Tenpin bowling)	International Bowling Federation	IBF	115	1926	bowling.sport	
Contract bridge	World Bridge Federation	WBF	97	1958	worldbridge.org	
Cheerleading	International Cheer Union	ICU	116	2004	cheerunion.org	(Note: Also a member of The Association for International Sport for All (TAFISA).)
Chess	International Chess Federation	FIDE	201	1924	fide.com	
Climbing & Mountaineering	International Climbing and Mountaineering Federation	UIAA	97	1932	theuiaa.org	
Cricket	International Cricket Council	ICC	105	1909	icc-cricket.com	
Dancesport	World DanceSport Federation	WDSF	98	1957	worlddancesport.org	
Floorball	International Floorball Federation	IFF	81	1986	floorball.sport	
Frisbee sports	World Flying Disc Federation	WFDF	122	1985	wfdf.sport	
Ice stock sport	International Federation Icestocksport	IFI	56	1950	icestock.sport	
Karate	World Karate Federation	WKF	200	1970	wkf.net	
Kickboxing	World Association of Kickboxing Organizations	WAKO	143	1972	wako.sport	
Korfball	International Korfball Federation	IKF	71	1933	korfball.sport	
Lacrosse	World Lacrosse	WL	91	1974	worldlacrosse.sport	
Lifesaving	International Life Saving Federation	ILSF	180	1910	ilsf.org	
Motorcycle sport	International Motorcycling Federation	FIM	120	1904	fim-moto.com	
Muay Thai	International Federation of Muaythai Associations	IFMA	148	1993	muaythai.sport	
Netball	World Netball	WN	84	1960	netball.sport	
Orienteering	International Orienteering Federation	IOF	79	1961	orienteering.sport	
Polo	Federation of International Polo	FIP	76	1982	fippolo.com	
Powerboating	International Powerboating Union	UIM	65	1922	uim.sport	
Racquetball	International Racquetball Federation	IRF	73	1979	internationalracquetball.com	
Sambo	International Sambo Federation	FIAS	124	1984	sambo.sport	
Ski mountaineering	International Ski Mountaineering Federation	ISMF	47	1999	ismf-ski.com	(Note: Also an associate member of Winter Olympic Federations (WOF).)
Squash	World Squash	WS	118	1967	worldsquash.sport	
Sumo	International Sumo Federation	IFS	87	1992	International Sumo Federation	
Tug of war	Tug of War International Federation	TWIF	75	1960	tugofwar-twif.org	
Underwater sports	World Underwater Federation	CMAS	156	1959	cmas.org	
University sports	International University Sports Federation	FISU	164	1949	fisu.net	
Water skiing & Wakeboarding	International Waterski & Wakeboard Federation	IWWF	90	1946	iwwf.sport	
Wushu	International Wushu Federation	IWUF	160	1990	iwuf.org	

== Former members ==
Sport	International federation	Acronym	National associations	Year founded	Official website	Notes
Golf	International Golf Federation	IGF	154	1958	igfgolf.org	
Roller sports	World Skate	WS	130	1924	worldskate.org	
Rugby union	World Rugby	WR	113	1886	world.rugby	
Sport climbing	World Climbing	WC	98	2007	worldclimbing.com	
Surfing & Bodyboarding	International Surfing Association	ISA	117	1964	isasurf.org	

== See also ==
- Association of Summer Olympic International Federations
- Winter Olympic Federations
- International Olympic Committee
- SportAccord
- International World Games Association
- List of international sports federations
