= Raffaele Chiulli =

Italian sports executive

Raffaele Chiulli (born 22 January 1957) is an Italian sports executive who is the president of SportAccord, the Association of IOC Recognised International Sports Federations (ARISF) and the Union Internationale Motonautique (UIM), the International Power Boating Federation. He was the president of Global Association of International Sports Federations (GAISF), the former umbrella organization for all (Olympic and non-Olympic) International Sports Federations, from 2018 through 2021.

== Early life and education ==
Chiulli was born in Rome, Italy. He earned a Doctor of Sciences with honors from the Sapienza University of Rome and undertook post-graduate education at Duke University, Institut Européen d'Administration des Affaires (INSEAD), and International Institute for Management Development (IMD) in Switzerland. He speaks Italian natively, as well as English, French and Spanish.

== Administrative career ==
Chiulli has served as president of the Union Internationale Motonautique (UIM), the International Power Boating Federation, since 2007. In 2020 he was part of an initiative, led by Alejandro Agag, to create the world's first electric boat racing series. Chiulli has also served as president of the Association of IOC Recognised International Sports Federations (ARISF) since 2013, when he defeated Carlos Freitag of the World DanceSport Federation in an election.

Having served as vice-president of the Global Association of International Sports Federations (GAISF) since 2015 and senior vice-president since 2016, on 18 May 2019, Chiulli was elected as president of the organization. He announced the inaugural World Urban Games, held in 2019 in Budapest. Chiulli was also involved in restarting the World Combat Games in 2021. He was succeeded in the GAISF presidency by Ivo Ferriani in December 2021.
