= Anna Glennon =

American professional watercraft racer (born 1996)

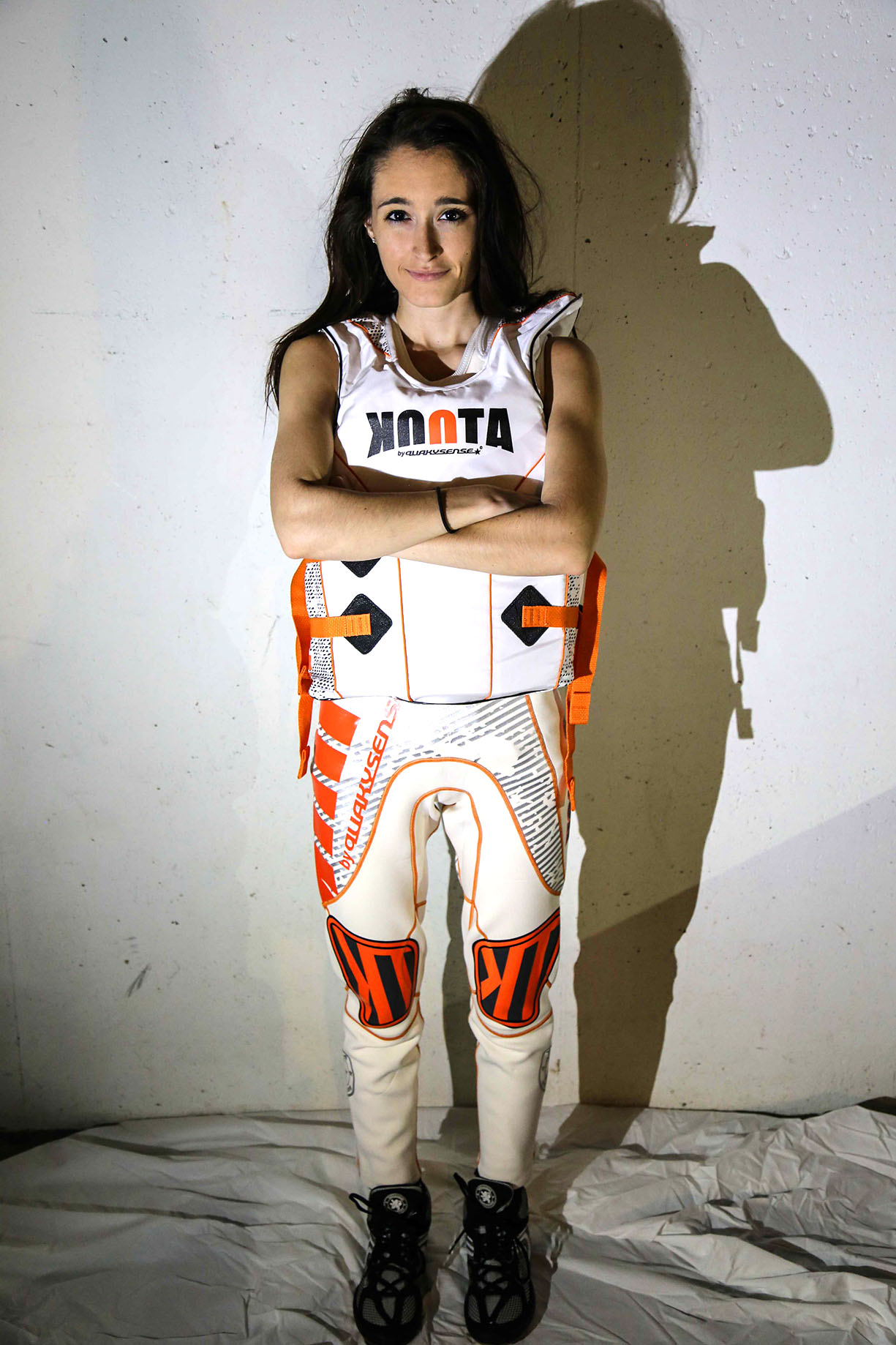

Anna Glennon (born April 29, 1996) is an American professional watercraft (Jet Ski) racer from Overland Park, Kansas.. She is a World Champion and 8-time U.S. and Canadian National Champion. She is known by her nickname, Jet Girl 777.

Glennon won her first national championship during her first full season of racing in 2013. She is the only woman in IJSBA history to win the Men's Classic Two-Stroke World Championship title.

Glennon established her race team, Jet Girls Racing in 2012. The team consists of two riders, Glennon and her sister Jessie and their father and mechanic, John.

== Personal life ==
Glennon was born to John and Carrie Glennon in 1996. She has one younger sibling, Jessie Glennon, who is a former personal watercraft racer and Junior Ski National Champion.

Glennon grew up at her family lake home on the Lake of the Ozarks in Missouri. This is where she learned to ride and where she formerly trained.

In 2012, the Glennon family began racing after riding personal watercraft for more than ten years. Her first race ski was a Kawasaki SX-I Pro. After her first race, her father purchased a Kawasaki SX-R 800. which is now her World Championship race machine.

Glennon is a Digital Media Communications graduate from the University of Central Missouri in Warrensburg, MO.

Glennon is involved in supporting the Junior Stars Racing group, she works with young athletes on social media use and sponsorships every year at Junior Stars Day with the Pros in Lake Havasu, AZ.

Glennon was formerly the social media and communications manager for the TPJ Fly Racing professional Supercross and Motocross team.

In February 2018, Glennon was formerly the media and marketing director of Galfer Performance Brakes.

In February 2020, Glennon became the marketing and sales director for Pro Watercraft.

== Equipment ==
Glennon is most well-known for racing the Women's Ski Limited class. Her equipment is built in-house by herself and her father. She has also raced Men's Ski Stock, Men's Ski Lites, Vintage Ski and Men's Ski GP. Glennon has several Kawasaki SX-R 800s and JS440s, each for different classes.

In 2020, Glennon began racing a four-stroke Kawasaki SX-R 1500.

== Championships ==
- 2013 Women's Ski U.S. National Champion
- 2013 Women's Ski U.S. National Tour Points Champion
- 2013 Men's Ski Stock Nauti Water Champion
- 2013 Vintage Ski Nauti Water Champion
- 2015 Women's Ski Canadian National Champion
- 2015 Vintage Ski Canadian National Champion
- 2016 Women's Ski U.S. National Champion
- 2016 Men's Ski Stock U.S. National Champion
- 2016 Men's Ski Two Stroke Limited World Champion
- 2017 Women's Ski Nauti Water Champion

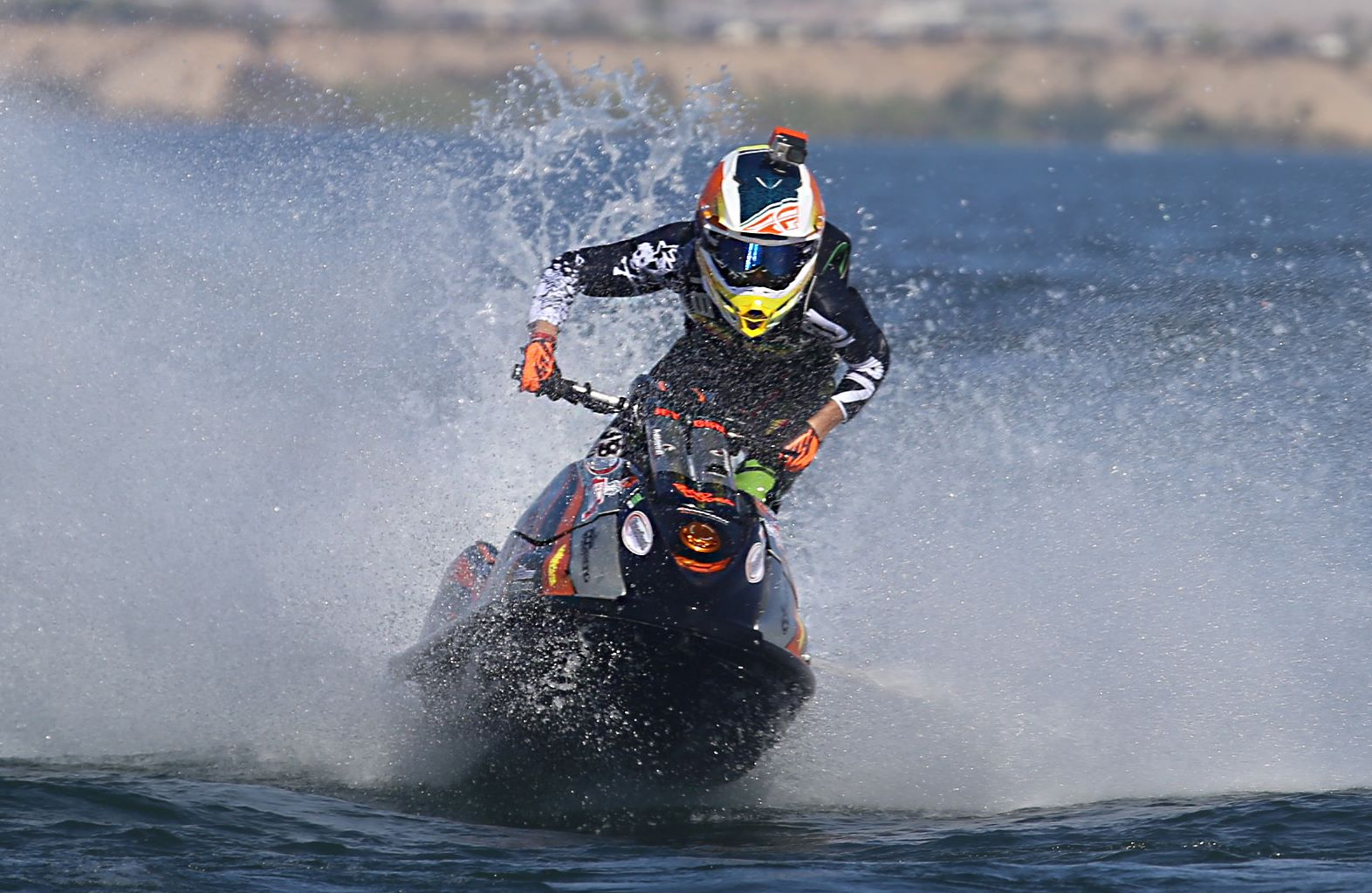
Glennon on her way to her 2016 World Championship.

Anna Glennon (Jet Girl 777)
| Country | United States |
| Born | April 29, 1996 (age 25) |
Sport
| Sport | Jet Ski racing |
| Team | Jet Girls Racing |
| Racing number | 777 |
Titles
| IJSBA World Championship | World Champion 2x Vice World Champion |
| IJSBA U.S. National Championship | 4x U.S. National Champion |
| IJSBA Canadian National Championship | 4x National Champion |
| IJSBA Midwest Championship | 3x Champion |

== Other accomplishments ==
- Glennon is the only woman to win the Men's Two Stroke World Championship.
