= Aquabike World Championship =

Powerboating sports competition

Motor racing formula
- Category: GP1 (Class Pro)
- Country or region: World
- Championships: Runabout Ski Freestyle
- Inaugural season: 1992
- Status: Ongoing
- Current champions: Runabout GP1, Freestyle, Ski GP1, Ski Ladies GP1: (France) Francois Medori; (Italy) Roberto Mariani; (Denmark) Oliver Koch Hansen; (France) Estelle Poret

The UIM-ABP Aquabike World Championship is a powerboating sports competition. The UIM-ABP Aquabike World Championship is the premier class of jetski racing, founded in 1992. Aquabike jetskis are personal watercraft vehicles purpose-built for racing and modified according to class. The UIM-ABP Aquabike World Championship is organized and promoted by H2O Racing Ltd on behalf of the Union Internationale Motonautique (UIM), the governing body of powerboating and the exclusive entity recognized by the International Olympic Committee (IOC). ABP refers to Aquabike Promotion.

== Types of bikes ==
Currently, there are two types of Aquabikes (jetskis); Ski and Runabout

=== Ski ===
This term refers to an Aquabike designed to be stood upon and is powered by rear jet propulsion with a completely closed system. Skis, by definition, are the most demanding to ride as they require high fitness levels and great physical strength as well as agility in the legs and arms. According to the different degrees of modifications to the engine and bodywork, this type of Aquabike is used for three different categories: GP1, GP2 and Stock. Another category (GP3) also exists in which younger drivers, between the ages of 11 and 14, compete.

Ski bikes are also used in the Freestyle category however this requires further structural changes to the size and motor, allowing the Ski to become considerably shorter in length, lighter in weight and able to perform better at low engine speeds.

Ski bikes are currently used in three different disciplines of the UIM-ABP Aquabike World Championship: Closed Circuit, Parallel Slalom and Freestyle.

=== Runabout ===
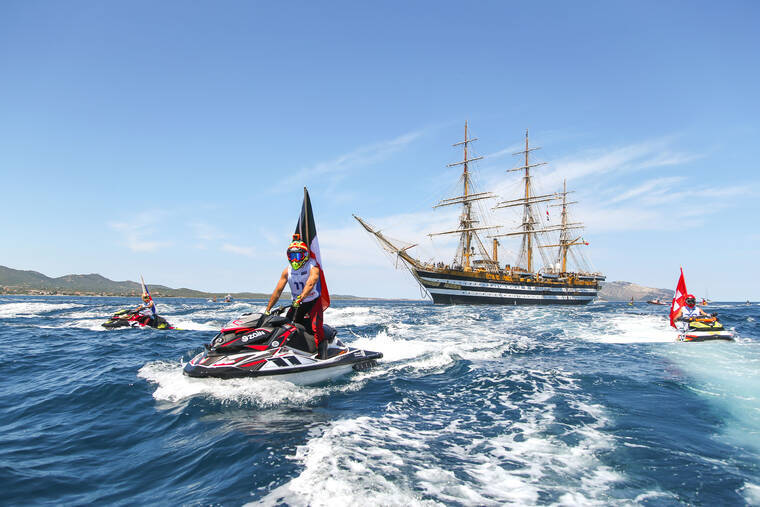

Runabout refers to the largest and most powerful bikes in the Championship. Runabout bikes are designed for driving while seated and feature a saddle (located towards the front) and a rear jet or a completely closed propulsion system. Runabouts are the most common jetski in the world, as they can also be used for recreational purposes.

As with Ski bikes, Runabout bikes are used for three different racing categories: GP1, GP2 and Stock, according to the different degrees of modifications to the engine and bodywork. Another category (GP3) also exists in which younger drivers, between the ages of 11 and 14, compete.

Runabout bikes are used in five different disciplines of the UIM-ABP Aquabike World Championship: Closed Circuit, Offshore, Endurance, Jet Raid and Parallel Slalom.

== Disciplines ==
The UIM-ABP Aquabike World Championship is divided into 5 categories:

=== Closed Circuit ===
These races are held near coastlines. Regulations require that the path does not exceed 1300m in length. The circuit is marked out by different coloured buoys: yellow (right turn) and red (left turn). Riders are required to complete a set number of laps (varies according to racing division) at the end of which, the chequered flag is waved by marshals.

=== Offshore ===
Offshore races take place at sea. These races are held across long distances and require serious consideration to be taken for refuelling as this is usually done on land. The circuit is bordered by large buoys (visible from long distances) or by natural landmarks like coastline, lighthouses, islands, rocks, etc .

=== Endurance ===
Endurance races are held on long closed circuits. As endurance races are testing the long-term resistance of a rider and their bike, these races tend to last several hours and are more akin to a marathon as opposed to a sprint. Given the long duration of the race, supplies are required in advance to ensure everything runs smoothly. Runabout bikes are used in endurance races.

=== Jet Raid ===
These races are spread over several stages. Riders are required to travel long distances marked by checkpoints to complete the race. These races are often very time consuming as riders cover one expanse of water, and reach the coast on the other side, where their bike then has to be transported by land to the next race stage.

=== Freestyle ===
This category is more of a competition than a race. Riders are given a duration of three minutes to perform a rehearsed routine, one at a time. The stunts are evaluated by a team of five expert judges. The evaluation criteria are: quality, quantity and variety. The most common moves are Backflip, Barrel Roll, 360, Superman and Submarine.

== Safety ==
Safety and security is of paramount importance during all the races and tests. Each member of the rescue team present at all races is required to have a certificate proving their ability to rescue and transport personal watercraft and injured riders. The support of the firefighters and patrol boats is essential as they ensure the immediate action in case of more serious accidents. On the ground, there is a medical team specialised in traumatology who are able to accompany the riders to the closest hospital to the race site. In offshore racing, there is also a helicopter rescue service.

== Results ==
=== Runabout GP1 ===
Season	Champion	Second	Third
2025	(France) Francois Medori	(France) Jeremy Perez	(Hungary) Gyorgy Kasza
2024	(Sweden) Samuel Johansson	(France) Francois Medori	(Portugal) Lino Araujo
2023	(France) François Medori	(France) Jérémy Perez	(Kuwait) Yousef Al Abdulrazzaq
2022	(Hungary) Marcus Jorgensen	(France) François Medori	(France) Jérémy Perez
2021	(France) Jérémy Perez	(Kuwait) Yousef Al Abdulrazzaq	(Portugal) Lino Araujo
2020	(Kuwait) Yousef Al Abdulrazzaq	(Hungary) Marcus Jorgensen	(France) Jérémy Perez
2019	(France) Jérémy Perez	(Sweden) Samuel Johansson	(Hungary) Marcus Jorgensen
2018	(France) Jérémy Perez	(Sweden) Lars Åkerblom	(United Kingdom) James Bushell
2017	(Kuwait) Yousef Al Abdulrazzaq	(Sweden) Lars Åkerblom	(United Kingdom) James Bushell
2016	(Kuwait) Yousef Al Abdulrazzaq	(United Kingdom) James Bushell	(Sweden) Lars Åkerblom
2015	(Kuwait) Yousef Al Abdulrazzaq	(France) Jean-Baptiste Botti	(France) Jérémy Perez
2014	(France) Teddy Pons	(France) Jérémy Perez	(Sweden) Lars Åkerblom
2013	(Kuwait) Yousef Al Abdulrazzaq	(France) Cyrille Lemoine	(France) Jérémy Perez
2012	(France) François Medori	(France) Cyrille Lemoine	(Italy) Lorenzo Benaglia
2011	(Italy) Mattia Fracasso	(France) François Medori	(France) Cyrille Lemoine
2010	(France) Cyrille Lemoine	(France) François Medori	(France) Teddy Pons
2009	(France) Teddy Pons	(Italy) Lorenzo Benaglia	(Spain) Jordi Tomas
2008	(Greece) Constantinos Malamanitis	(Hungary) Laszlo Sumegi	(Hungary) Andras Vagott
2007	(France) Davy Vaitilingon	(France) Philippe Chastanet	(France) Jean-Philippe Dies
2006	(France) Cyrille Lemoine	(Italy) Gimmi Bosio	(Spain) Jose Manuel Cruzado
2005	(Luxembourg) Steve Stievenart	(Italy) Christian Speciale	(Hungary) Laszlo Sumegi
2004	(France) Didier Navarro	(United Arab Emirates) Mohamed Al Mansouri	(United Arab Emirates) Rashid Al-Tayer
2003	(United Arab Emirates) Nadir bin Hendi	(France) Didier Navarro	(Italy) Lorenzo Benaglia
2002	(Italy) Gimmi Bosio	(Italy) Cesare Vismara	(United Arab Emirates) Nadir bin Hendi
2001	(Italy) Gimmi Bosio	(Italy) Lorenzo Benaglia	(France) Didier Navarro
1999	(France) Didier Navarro	(France) Cyrille Lemoine	(Italy) Gimmi Bosio
1997	(Spain) David Selles	(Italy) Lorenzo Camplani	(Spain) Jose Casanova
1996	(France) Joël Bontoux	(Switzerland) Jean-Luc Docquier	(France) Pierre Nataly

=== Ski GP1 ===
Season	Champion	Second	Third
2025	(Denmark) Oliver Koch Hansen	(France) Jeremy Poret	(Japan) Toshi Ohara
2024	(Belgium) Quinten Bossche	(Austria) Kevin Reiterer	(France) Morgan Poret
2023	(France) Mickaël Poret	(Denmark) Oliver Koch Hansen	(France) Morgan Poret
2022	(France) Valentin Dardillat	(France) Axel Courtois	(France) Morgan Poret
2021	(Spain) Nacho Armillas	(United Arab Emirates) Kevin Reiterer	(Denmark) Andres Keller
2020	(Norway) Stian Schjetlein	(Spain) Nacho Armillas	(Austria) Kevin Reiterer
2019	(Austria) Kevin Reiterer	(Norway) Daniel Save Andersen	(Norway) Stian Schjetlein
2018	(Austria) Kevin Reiterer	(France) Raphael Maurin	(Belgium) Quinten Bossche
2017	(Belgium) Quinten Bossche	(Austria) Kevin Reiterer	(France) Mickaël Poret
2016	(France) Jérémy Poret	(Austria) Kevin Reiterer	(Spain) Nacho Armillas
2015	(Austria) Kevin Reiterer	(France) Jérémy Poret	(Spain) Nacho Armillas
2014	(France) Jérémy Poret	(United States) Chris MacClugage	(Portugal) Tiago Sousa
2013	(France) Mickaël Poret	(Portugal) Tiago Sousa	(Italy) Alberto Monti
2012	(France) Jérémy Poret	(Spain) Nacho Armillas	(Italy) Alberto Monti
2011	(France) Jérémy Poret	(France) Christopher Courtois	(France) Jean-Baptiste Botti
2010	(France) Mickaël Poret	(France) Jérémy Poret	(France) Christopher Courtois
2009	(France) Steven Dauliach	(France) Franky Zapata	(France) Mickaël Poret
2008	(Italy) Alberto Monti	(France) Bruce Lopez	(Italy) Matteo Gaddoni
2007	(Croatia) Slaven Ivančić	(France) Audrey Dujardin	(France) Louis-Nathan Lavocat
2006	(France) Ludovic Caumont	(France) Didier Navarro	(Italy) Matteo Luzzatti
2005	(Italy) Alberto Monti	(France) Kevin Laigle	(Italy) Gianfranco Oliveri
2004	(France) Kevin Laigle	(Italy) Alberto Monti	(France) Didier Navarro
2003	(France) Kevin Laigle	(United Kingdom) Ryan Burt	(France) Didier Navarro
2002	(Spain) David Selles	(Italy) Angelo Bertozzi	(Italy) Alberto Monti
2001	(Italy) Alberto Monti	(Italy) Andrea Finchi	(France) Jerome Boyadjian

=== Ski Ladies ===
Season	Champion	Second	Third
2025	(France) Estelle Poret	(Estonia) Jasmiin Üpraus	(Norway) Benedicte Drange
2024	(Estonia) Jasmiin Üpraus	(France) Jessica Chavanne	(Norway) Benedicte Drange
2023	(France) Jessica Chavanne	(Estonia) Jasmiin Üpraus	(Sweden) Emma-Nellie Örtendahl
2022	(Estonia) Jasmiin Üpraus	(France) Jessica Chavanne	(Sweden) Jonna Borgstrom
2021	(Sweden) Jonna Borgstrom	(Sweden) Emma-Nellie Örtendahl	(Estonia) Jasmiin Üpraus
2020	(France) Jessica Chavanne	(Estonia) Jasmiin Üpraus	(France) Estelle Poret
2019	(Sweden) Emma-Nellie Örtendahl	(Sweden) Joanna Borgstrom	(France) Estelle Poret
2018	(Latvia) Krista Uzare	(Sweden) Emma-Nellie Örtendahl	(Estonia) Jasmin Üpraus
2017	(Sweden) Emma-Nellie Örtendahl	(France) Estelle Poret	(Latvia) Krista Uzare
2016	(Sweden) Emma-Nellie Örtendahl	(France) Jennifer Ménard	(Portugal) Beatriz Curtinhal
2015	(France) Jennifer Ménard	(Sweden) Emma-Nellie Örtendahl	(Portugal) Beatriz Curtinhal
2014	(France) Jennifer Ménard	(France) Estelle Poret	(Italy) Marta Sorrentino
2013	(Serbia) Pija Šumer	(Italy) Marta Sorrentino	(France) Jennifer Ménard
2012	(Portugal) Stefania Balzer	(Serbia) Pija Šumer	(France) Julie Bulteau
2011	(France) Julie Bulteau	(Portugal) Stefania Balzer	(Serbia) Pija Šumer
2010	(France) Julie Bulteau	(Italy) Marta Sorrentino	(Portugal) Stefania Balzer
2009	(France) Julie Bulteau	(Spain) Patty Guttierez	(Italy) Paola Boggi
2007	(Italy) Alessia Ida	(France) Audrey Dujardin	(France) Julie Bulteau
2006	(France) Audrey Dujardin	(Italy) Alessia Ida	(France) Julie Bulteau
2005	(Italy) Elisa Sabatino	(Italy) Tatiana Mercuriali	(France) Victoria Molyneaux

=== Freestyle ===
Season	Champion	Second	Third
2025	(Italy) Roberto Mariani	(United Arab Emirates) Rashid Al Mulla	(Italy) Massimo Accumulo
2024	(United Arab Emirates) Rashid Al Mulla	(Italy) Roberto Mariani	(Portugal) Paulo Nunes
2023	(Italy) Roberto Mariani	(United Arab Emirates) Rashid Al Mulla	(Portugal) Paulo Nunes
2022	(United Arab Emirates) Rashid Al Mulla	(Italy) Roberto Mariani	(Italy) Alberto Camerlengo
2021	(United Arab Emirates) Rashid Al Mulla	(Italy) Roberto Mariani	(Portugal) Paulo Nunes
2020	(United Arab Emirates) Rashid Al Mulla	(Italy) Roberto Mariani	(Czech Republic) Jaroslav Tirner
2019	(United Arab Emirates) Rashid Al Mulla	(Italy) Roberto Mariani	(Russia) Sergey Chemezov
2018	(United Arab Emirates) Rashid Al Mulla	(Portugal) Paulo Nunes	(Italy) Roberto Mariani
2017	(Slovenia) Nac Florjančič	(Italy) Roberto Mariani	(United Arab Emirates) Rashid Al Mulla
2016	(Slovenia) Rok Florjančič	(United Arab Emirates) Rashid Al Mulla	(Slovenia) Nac Florjančič
2015	(Slovenia) Rok Florjančič	(Slovenia) Nac Florjančič	(Italy) Roberto Mariani
2014	(Slovenia) Rok Florjančič	(Slovenia) Nac Florjančič	(Italy) Roberto Mariani
2013	(Slovenia) Rok Florjančič	(Slovenia) Nac Florjančič	(Montenegro) Aleksandar Petrović
2012	(Slovenia) Nac Florjančič	(France) Romain Stampers	(Slovenia) Rok Florjančič
2011	(Italy) Valerio Calderoni	(France) Romain Stampers	(Italy) Roberto Mariani
2010	(Russia) Ivan Potanin	(Italy) Valerio Calderoni	(France) Romain Stampers
2009	(Italy) Valerio Calderoni	(France) Romain Stampers	(Italy) Roberto Mariani
2008	(United Kingdom) Lee Stone	(Italy) Valerio Calderoni	(Russia) Ekaterina Tolkonova
2007	(United Kingdom) Lee Stone	(France) Romain Stampers	(Italy) Valerio Calderoni
2006	(United Kingdom) Lee Stone	(Brazil) Alessander Lenzi	(France) Romain Stampers
2005	(Brazil) Alessander Lenzi	(France) Romain Stampers	(Italy) Rosario Caruso
2004	(Brazil) Alessander Lenzi	(France) Romain Stampers	(United States) Rob Bortolameolli
2003	(Brazil) Alessander Lenzi	(Germany) Marc Sickerling	(France) Romain Stampers
2002	(Germany) Marc Sickerling	(Brazil) Alessander Lenzi	(Italy) Federico Bufacchi
2001	(Italy) Giampaolo Marcante	(Italy) Federico Bufacchi	(Italy) Sergio Marcolini
1999	(Italy) Federico Bufacchi	(Croatia) Kresimir Erderc	(France) Stéphane Prayas
1997	(Germany) Marc Sickerling	(France) Stéphane Prayas	(Germany) Marco Scheel
1996	(Germany) Marc Sickerling	(France) Stéphane Prayas	(United States) Jeff Richichi

== See also ==
- Motorboat racing
- Offshore powerboat racing
