= Inshore powerboat racing =

Type of racing by ocean-going powerboats

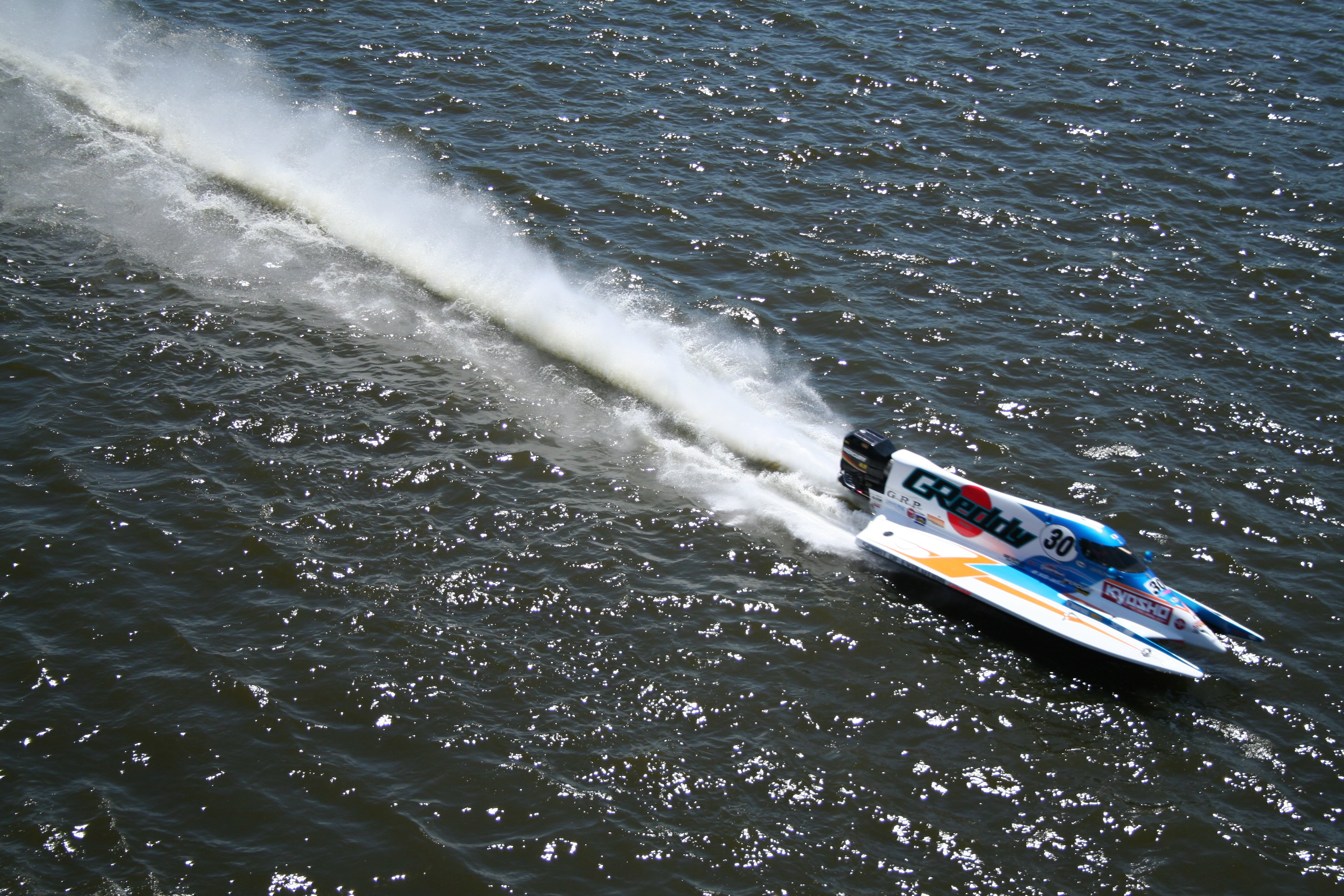
A ChampBoat at the 2006 Minneapolis race.

Inshore powerboat racing is a form of water-based motorsport using powerboats in sheltered or inland stretches of water, including lakes, rivers, docks and sheltered bays. It is often referred to as circuit powerboat racing because of the frequency of inshore races to use the format of a circuit loop, around which boats race for a number of predetermined laps.

International races and championships are administered by the Union Internationale Motonautique (UIM) while national events are organised by the relevant country's own powerboat association.

== Categories ==
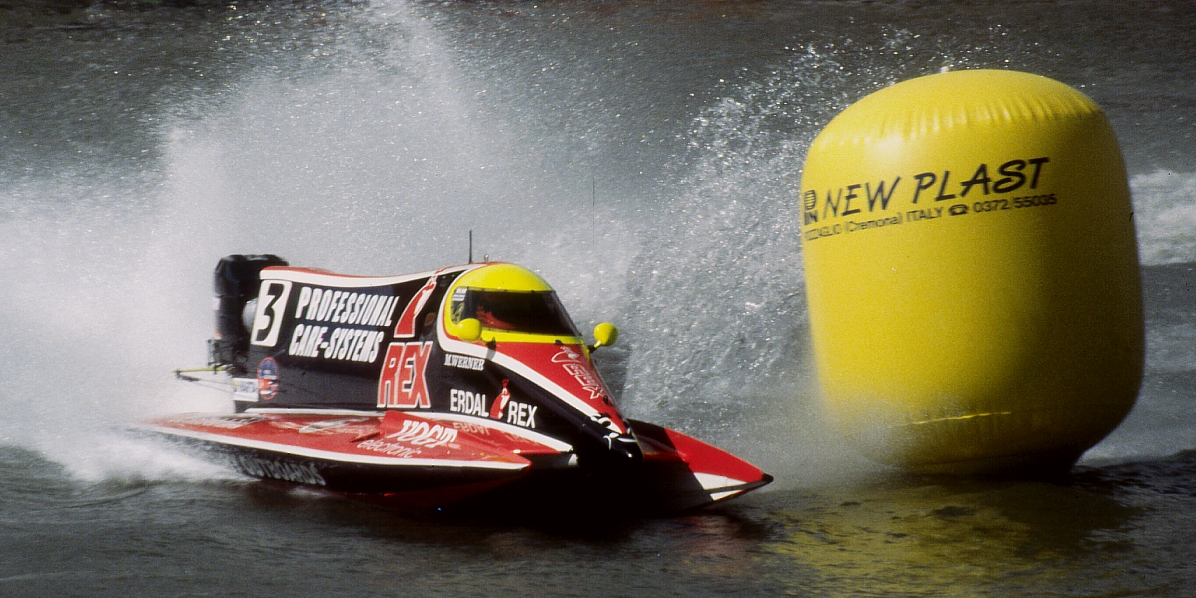
An F1 powerboat rounding a buoy

There are numerous categories that define the levels of competition for inshore powerboat racing. Much like circuit car racing, the highest levels are designated "Formula" followed by a number, and the principal of these is the Formula 1 Powerboat World Championship. Each "Formula" level follows a different set of regulations that specify the design of the boat and engine, as well as the rules of competition.

The most common form of inshore powerboat racing involves a race around a two pin (buoy) or multi-pin circuit of approximately 1.5 – 2 km in length. Each pin marks a turn in the course. Races will vary in duration, normally no more than 45 minutes, but endurance category races can last much longer, such as the "24 Hours of Rouen".

Historically, powerboat racing has been defined by 'classes' and this is still the case in offshore powerboat racing where Class 1 is the premier category. For inshore racing, up until the creation of Formula 1, the OZ, ON, and OE classes were regarded as the most prestigious categories.

The following Formula categories are currently sanctioned by the UIM:

Category	Date founded	Current champion	Notes
Formula 1	1981	(Sweden) Jonas Andersson	
Formula 2	2002	(United Arab Emirates) Rashed Al Qemzi	
Formula 4	2005	(Norway) Andrè Solvang	
Formula 4S	2010	(Germany) Max Stilz	Runs as a support category on the F1 tour.
Formula 500	2004	(Slovakia) Marian Jung	European championship ran from 1987-2002.
Formula 350	2006	(Italy) Claudio Fanzini	
Formula 250	2001	(Hungary) Peter Bodor	
Formula 125	2004	(Italy) Alex Zilioli	
Formula R1000	2002	(Germany) Reinhard Gerbert	

- Formula 3 is one of many defunct "Formula" categories; it was cancelled after 2004.

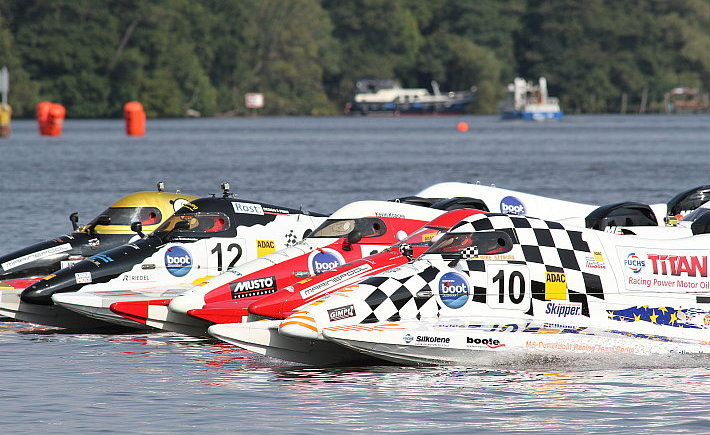
Brodenbach F-4s start

The following non-Formula categories are also sanctioned by the UIM:

- GT15
- GT30
- SST45
- SST200
- O125
- O250
- O350
- O500
- O700
- JT250
- OSY400
- S550
- P750
- HR850
- FR1000
- OB2000
- OB3000
- Endurance S1
- Endurance S2
- Endurance S3

== National competitions ==
As well as global and continental championships, individual nations have thriving domestic scenes too. In particular the United States, but also many countries in Europe, as well as Australia, New Zealand and South Africa. In recent years, the sport has become very popular in the Persian Gulf region, particularly the United Arab Emirates and also Qatar.

== Boat designs ==
Many inshore championships utilise variations on the catamaran style boat design, particularly the higher levels of the sport. In lower categories however, different designs are utilised which are determined by the class regulations. In these instances, traditional V hulls and inflatables are common and are the accepted way for younger pilots to gain experience and progress through to the more powerful catamarans.

== See also ==
- Motorboat racing
- Offshore powerboat racing
- Formula 1 Powerboat World Championship
- Formula 4s Powerboat World Championship
