= World Port Days =

Maritime event in Rotterdam, Netherlands

The World Port Days, also known as the World Harbour Days, (Dutch: Wereldhavendagen) is a large, festive maritime event held annually in Rotterdam. It is one of the most highly attended events in the Netherlands.

== Highlights ==
World Port Days is a large annual multi-day event in the first weekend of September in the port of Rotterdam. The aim is to introduce the public to and give a glimpse behind the scenes of the port of Rotterdam, for example through ship visits, demonstrations on the water and presentations by port companies. The event attracts many visitors every year. Nowadays an important attraction is also the musical show and the fireworks on Saturday evening on the Nieuwe Maas, near the Erasmus Bridge. The locations are: the Nieuwe Maas as a demonstration area, Katendrecht, Wilhelminapier, Wilhelminaplein, Willemsplein, Willemskade, Veerkade at the Veerhaven, Westerkade and Parkkade. The International Shantyfestival Rotterdam will also take place during the event. Many shanty choirs from all over the world will perform at various locations in the Oude Haven and Leuvehaven. Regular participants are the providers of port services, such as tugs, pilots, rowers, water ships, and so on. The Port Authority, the Sea Police, Customs and the Royal Navy are also always present. The number of visitors runs into the hundreds of thousands, but also depends on the weather conditions. For example, there were 450,000 in 2014, but due to bad weather 'only' 320,000 the following year in 2015.

== History ==
Even before World War II, Harbor Days were organized to advertise the Port of Rotterdam. At the time, these were one-day events organized by the Rotterdam department of the Dutch company for industry and trade and the board of the Havenbelangen Foundation. The target group was not the general public, but a collection of prominent domestic and foreign business relations. The first Port Day was held on September 12, 1935 as part of the 'VVV week'. The program included a boat trip through the ports, a lunch in the former officers' society in Het Park and a tea in the Boyman Museum. During the third Harbor Day in 1937, the 375 guests were offered lunch in the civic hall of the town hall, after which they took a cruise on the Nieuwe Waterweg. After the Second World War, it took until September 1978 when the organization of Rotterdam Maritime 78 brought the Harbor Days to their current public-oriented character. It was a major event with a fleet show on the Nieuwe Maas with 180 ships, including the popular Charlotte Rhodes from the series The Onedin Line. The Royal House was also present with Queen Juliana, Prince Bernhard, Princess Beatrix, Prince Claus and the princes aboard the Piet Hein and the Groene Draeck. In 1979, the Open Port Day was held under the motto 'Hallo Haven', whereby the public was given access to normally closed industrial areas in the port, such as refineries and container terminals. In 1980 the decision was made to make Port Day an annual event. Eventually it also became the multi-day Harbor Days, which now take three days during the first weekend of September. The Port Days were held for the 30th time on 7, 8 and 9 September 2007, with the theme Working on World Class. There was also Admiral De Ruyter Homeport Race. In connection with the 30th anniversary, there was an opening port song by Gerard Cox and an evening program on September 8 with Gloria Estefan, among others. The Port of Rotterdam Authority also celebrated its 75th anniversary. There were various demonstrations including the Royal Navy, a Maas race, the Cat Logic sailing race, a Motorsloepenparade and the World Port Parade. In the Maritime Hotel / Zeemanshuis Rotterdam there were performances by various Shanty choirs. In the years that followed, the themes Green Light for the Port followed during the Rotterdam Green Year 2008; Rotterdam harbour; New energy aimed at new energy sources and at young people in the context of Rotterdam Youth Capital of Europe 2009. At the Wilhelminapier the Grand Princess, one of the largest cruise ships, came to Rotterdam center. The theme of the 40th edition of the World Port Days in 2017 was Rotterdam World! and attracted 430,000 visitors

== See also ==
- Port of Rotterdam
