= Union Internationale Motonautique =

International governing body of powerboating

- Sport: Powerboating
- Category: Water sport
- Jurisdiction: International
- Abbreviation: UIM
- Founded: 1922
- Affiliation: General Association of International Sports Federations, Association of IOC Recognised International Sports Federations
- Headquarters: Stade Louis II, Monaco
- Location: Principality of Monaco
- President: Raffaele Chiulli
- Secretary: Thomas Kurth
- Replaced: Union Internationale du Yachting Automobile

Official website
- www.uim.sport

The Union Internationale Motonautique (UIM; English: International Powerboating Union) is the international governing body of powerboating, based in the Principality of Monaco. It was founded in 1922, in Belgium, as the Union Internationale du Yachting Automobile.

== History ==
Member nations from 12 in 1927 to 60 in 2017.

=== Presidents ===
PRESIDENTS OF THE U.I.M.

1922-1944 Alfred Pierrard Belgium

1946-1972 Freddy Buysse Belgium

1972-1975 Vittore Catella Italy

1975-1978 Claude Bouilloux Lafont France

1978-1985 Francesco Cosentino Italy

1985-1987 Paul Lamberts Belgium

1987-2006 Ralf Frohling Germany

2007 Charles D.Strang U.S.A.

Since 2007 Raffaele Chiulli Italy

=== Secretaries General ===
SECRETARIES GENERAL OF THE U.I.M.

1922-1925 John Ward Ireland

1925-1965 Maurice Pauwaert Belgium

1965-1972 Henri Thomas Belgium

1973-1992 José Mawet Belgium

1992-2011 Régine Vandekerckhove Belgium

2011-2014 Andrea Dini Italy

Since 2014 Thomas Kurth Switzerland

== World Championships conducted under UIM ==
1. Circuit (F1H2o, F2, F500, F350, F250, F250, OSY400, GT-15, GT-30, FR1000 F4, Formula Future.), Circuit World, Circuit International Ordinary, Circuit Continental, Formula World, Formula Continental.
2. Aquabike : (Jet ski) Aquabike International Ordinary, Aquabike World Series, Aquabike World, Aquabike Continental Series
3. Offshore (XCAT, Class V1, Class V2, Powerboat P1 SuperStock, Class 3D, Class 3C, OCR F1, 2, 3 & Sport (Group C Experimental), Class 3A, Class 3B, Class 3J, Class 3X) Offshore World Series
4. Pleasure Navigation: Pleasure Navigation World, Pleasure Navigation European : World Pleasure Navigation Endurance Group B, European Pleasure Navigation - Endurance Group B - Class Promotion. World Pleasure Navigation Endurance Group B - Boat Production, World Pleasure Navigation Endurance Group B - Class S1, World Pleasure Navigation Endurance Group B - Class S2, World Pleasure Navigation Endurance Group B - Promotion.
5. Radio-controlled boats: Defunct after 2016. Radio Controlled International Ordinary, Radio Controlled World, Radio-controlled International Ordinary - Endurance E15, Radio-controlled International Ordinary - Endurance E27 2 hours, Radio-controlled International Ordinary - Endurance E3,5, World Offshore Radio-controlled, Radio-controlled International Ordinary - Endurance E27 2 hours, Radio-controlled International Ordinary - Endurance 15 6 hours.
6. MotoSurf Motosurf World Cup From 2021 : Electric Challenge, Juniors Class, Open Class, Rookies Class, Stock Class, Women Class

== Members ==
58 Nations in 2023:

1. Asia: 14 members
2. Oceana: 2 members
3. Africa: 3 members
4. Americas: 6 members
5. Europe: 33 members

=== Full Member (46) ===
1. Australia
2. Belgium
3. Czech Republic
4. Bulgaria
5. Colombia
6. Denmark
7. Croatia
8. China
9. Egypt
10. Estonia
11. Finland
12. France
13. Germany
14. United Kingdom
15. Hungary
16. Indonesia
17. Ireland
18. Italy
19. Japan
20. South Korea
21. Kuwait
22. Latvia
23. Lebanon
24. Lithuania
25. Maldives
26. Malta
27. Mexico
28. Monaco
29. Morocco
30. Netherlands
31. New Zealand
32. Norway
33. Poland
34. Portugal
35. Qatar
36. Russia
37. Slovakia
38. South Africa
39. Spain
40. Sri Lanka
41. Sweden
42. Turkey
43. Ukraine
44. United Arab Emirates
45. United States
46. Uruguay

=== Corresponding Member (13) ===
1. Austria
2. Canada
3. Macau
4. Cyprus
1. Montenegro
2. Saudi Arabia
3. Serbia
4. Slovenia
5. Switzerland
6. Thailand
7. Trinidad and Tobago
8. Sudan

== See also ==
- Association of IOC Recognised International Sports Federations
- Inshore powerboat racing
- Offshore powerboat racing
- Class 1 World Powerboat Championship
- Formula 1 Powerboat World Championship
- UIM F2 World Championship
- Formula 4S Powerboat World Championship
- Aquabike World Championship (powerboating)
- Offshore Super Series
- Water motorsports at the 1908 Summer Olympics
- Boat racing
- Yacht
- Seamanship
- Fédération Internationale de Motocyclisme
- Fédération Internationale de l'Automobile
- Fédération Aéronautique Internationale
