= L'Arrivée d'un train en gare de La Ciotat =

1896 film by Auguste and Louis Lumière

Coordinates: 43°11′59″N 5°37′58″E

L'arrivée d'un train en gare de La Ciotat
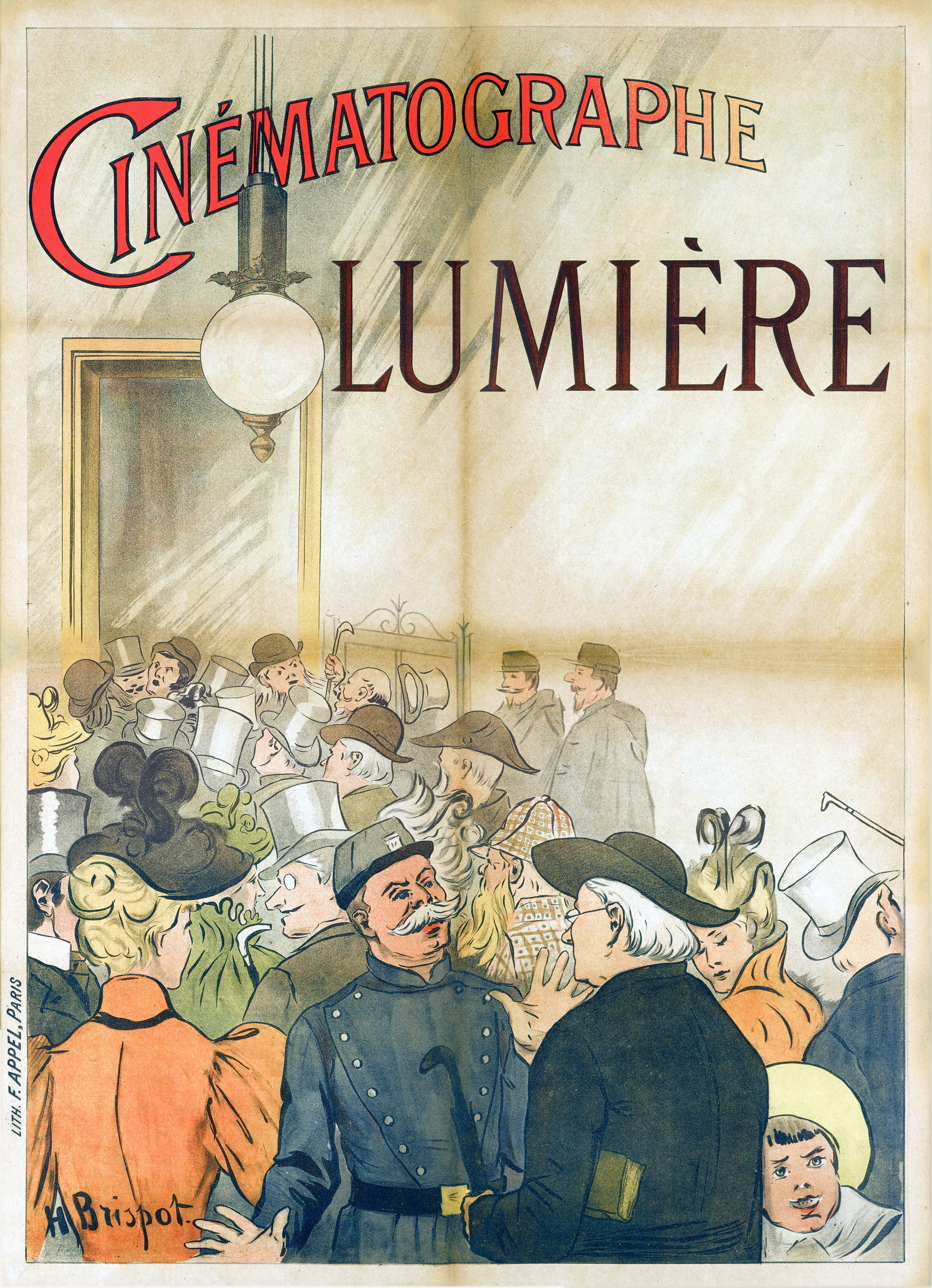
- An early Lumière advertisement
- Directed by: Auguste Lumière; Louis Lumière
- Produced by: Auguste Lumière; Louis Lumière
- Cinematography: Louis Lumière
- Production company: Société Lumière
- Distributed by: Société Lumière
- Release date: 25 January 1896
- Running time: 50 seconds
- Country: France
- Language: Silent

L'arrivée d'un train en gare de La Ciotat (translated from French into English as The Arrival of a Train at La Ciotat Station, Arrival of a Train at La Ciotat [US] and The Arrival of the Mail Train, and in the United Kingdom as Train Pulling into a Station) is an 1896 French short silent documentary film directed and produced by Auguste and Louis Lumière.

Contrary to popular belief, it was not shown at the Lumières' first public film screening on 28 December 1895 in Paris, France: the programme of ten films shown that day makes no mention of it. Its first public showing took place in January 1896 in Lyon. It is indexed as Lumière No. 653.

== Synopsis ==
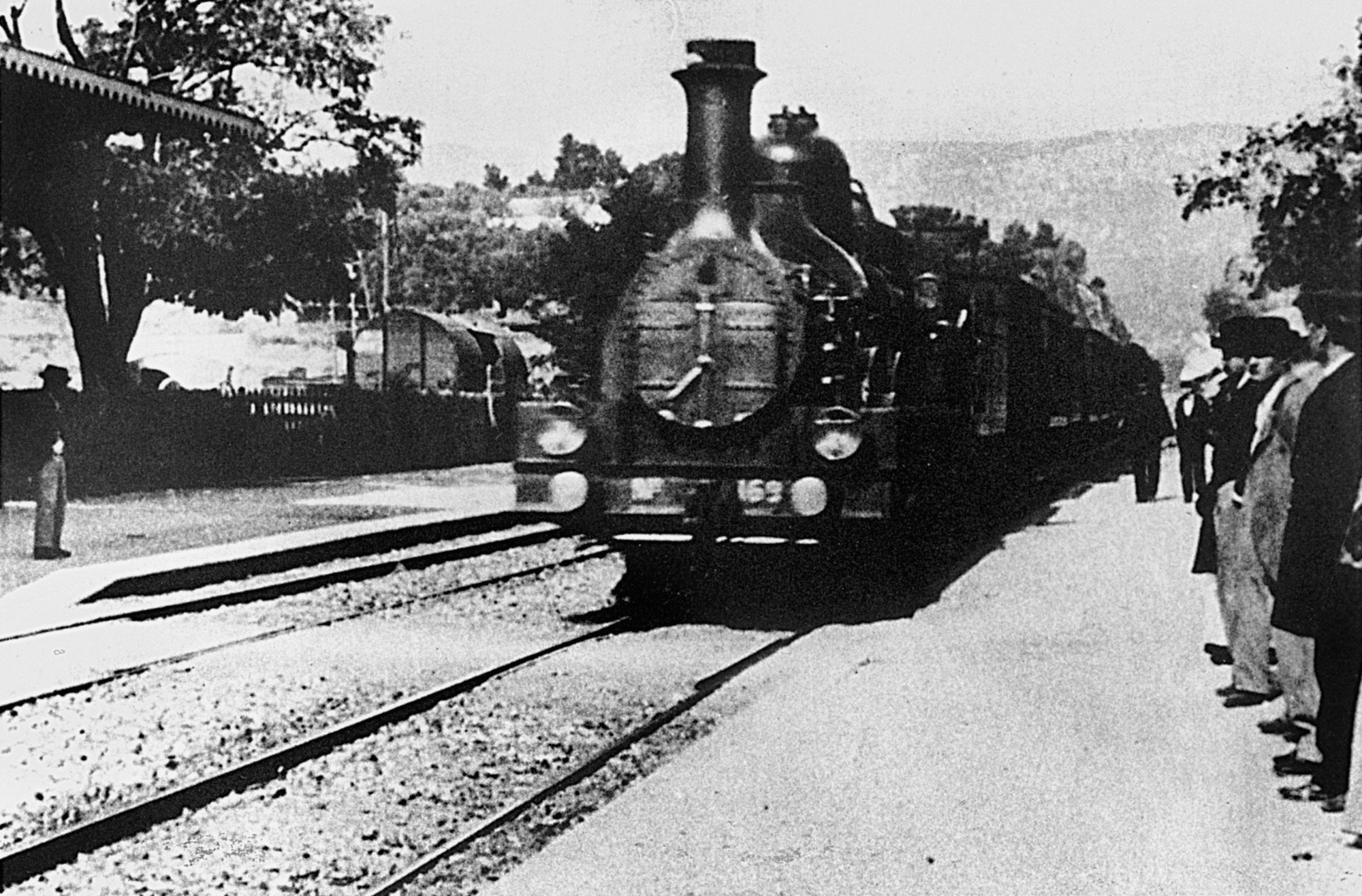
The train moving directly towards the camera was said to have terrified spectators at the first screening, a claim that has been called an urban legend.

This 50-second silent film shows the entry of a train pulled by a steam locomotive into the Gare de La Ciotat, the train station of the French southern coastal town of La Ciotat, near Marseille. Like most of the early Lumière films, L'arrivée d'un train en gare de La Ciotat consists of a single, unedited view illustrating an aspect of everyday life, a style of filmmaking known as actuality. There is no apparent intentional camera movement, and the film consists of one continuous real-time shot.

While the film appears to capture a mundane moment on a train platform, film scholar and historian Martin Loiperdinger has written that the film was likely at least partially staged. He points out that several members of the Lumière family can be seen among the crowd, and that no one on the platform looks at or acknowledges the camera, suggesting that they were instructed not to do so and are thus in some sense acting.

== Production ==
This 50-second movie was filmed in La Ciotat, Bouches-du-Rhône, France. It was filmed by means of the Cinématographe, an all-in-one camera which also serves as a printer and film projector. As with all early Lumière films, this film was made in a 35 mm format with an aspect ratio of 1.33:1. It had its first public showing at the Eden Theatre, La Ciotat.

== Contemporary reaction ==
The film is associated with a well-known rumor in the world of cinema. The story goes that when the film was first shown, the audience was so overwhelmed by the moving image of a life-sized train coming directly at them that people screamed and ran to the back of the room. Hellmuth Karasek in the German magazine Der Spiegel wrote that the film "had a particularly lasting impact; yes, it caused fear, terror, even panic". Martin Loiperdinger notes that there are no contemporary reports of audiences panicking at the sight, which likely would have caused injuries in the crowded exhibition rooms of the era and probably would have received coverage in local newspapers. Others such as theorist Benjamin H. Bratton have speculated that the alleged reaction may have been caused by the projection being mistaken for a camera obscura by the audience, which at the time would have been the only other technique to produce a naturalistic moving image.

L'Arrivée d'un train en gare de la Ciotat, summer 1897 (3rd version)

First version, 1896

Although there is no evidence of mass panic caused by the film, some who attended the exhibitions described being frightened by the sight of the train. In an 1896 article, Russian journalist Maxim Gorky wrote: "A train appears on the screen. It speeds right at you—watch out! It seems as though it will plunge into the darkness in which you sit, turning you into a ripped sack full of lacerated flesh and splintered bones, and crushing into dust and into broken fragments this hall and this building, so full of women, wine, music and vice. But this, too, is but a train of shadows. Noiselessly, the locomotive disappears beyond the edge of the screen. The train comes to a stop, and gray figures silently emerge from the cars, soundlessly greet their friends, laugh, walk, run, bustle, and ... are gone." Film historian Tom Gunning has suggested that the appeal of L'Arrivée d'un Train to contemporary audiences was the thrill of experiencing something which appears dangerous, despite being well aware that it is actually safe, similar to the modern experience of riding a roller coaster.

Lumière's L'Arrivée d'un Train inspired various imitators, such as Vitagraph Studios' The Black Diamond Express, whose exhibitors deliberately heightened the audience's fears by warning them that the train "will rush towards you, belching smoke and fire from its monstrous iron throat" before showing the film. Vitagraph co-founder Albert E. Smith wrote in his autobiography that two women fainted during a showing of The Black Diamond Express, leading the owner of the theater to position an ambulance in front of the entrance during all future showings of the film. This only made the motion picture more thrilling to audiences, and historian Stephen Bottomore suggests that the story of the women fainting may have been fabricated at the time as a publicity stunt. Bottomore collected many other anecdotes about audience reactions to L'Arrivée d'un Train and similar films, finding many firsthand accounts of spectators being startled or frightened by the images on the screen, but no confirmed instances of people actually believing that it was real.

As early as 1901, filmmakers parodied the idea of past audiences being terrified by L'Arrivée d'un Train, making comedic motion pictures that showed a naive rural person attending a showing and then fleeing in terror at the sight of an approaching train on the screen, such as The Countryman and the Cinematograph (1901) and Uncle Josh at the Moving Picture Show (1902). Loiperdinger suggests that this joke at the expense of "country rubes" may have provided the basis for the widespread belief that audiences really reacted that way.

== Other versions ==
What most film histories leave out is that the Lumière Brothers were trying to achieve a 3D image even prior to this first-ever public exhibition of motion pictures. Louis Lumière eventually re-shot L'Arrivée d'un Train with a stereoscopic film camera and exhibited it (along with a series of other 3D shorts) at a 1934 meeting of the French Academy of Science. Given the contradictory accounts that plague early cinema and pre-cinema accounts, it is plausible that early cinema historians conflated the audience reactions at these separate screenings of L'Arrivée d'un Train. The intense audience reaction fits better with the latter exhibition, when the train apparently was actually coming out of the screen at the audience. The 3D film never took off commercially as the conventional 2D version did; including such details would not make for a compelling myth.

Additionally, Loiperdinger notes that "three versions of L'Arrivée d'un train en gare de La Ciotat are known to have existed". According to L'œuvre cinématographique des frères Lumière, the Lumière catalogue website, the version most found online is of an 1897 reshoot which prominently features women and children boarding the train.

== Current status ==
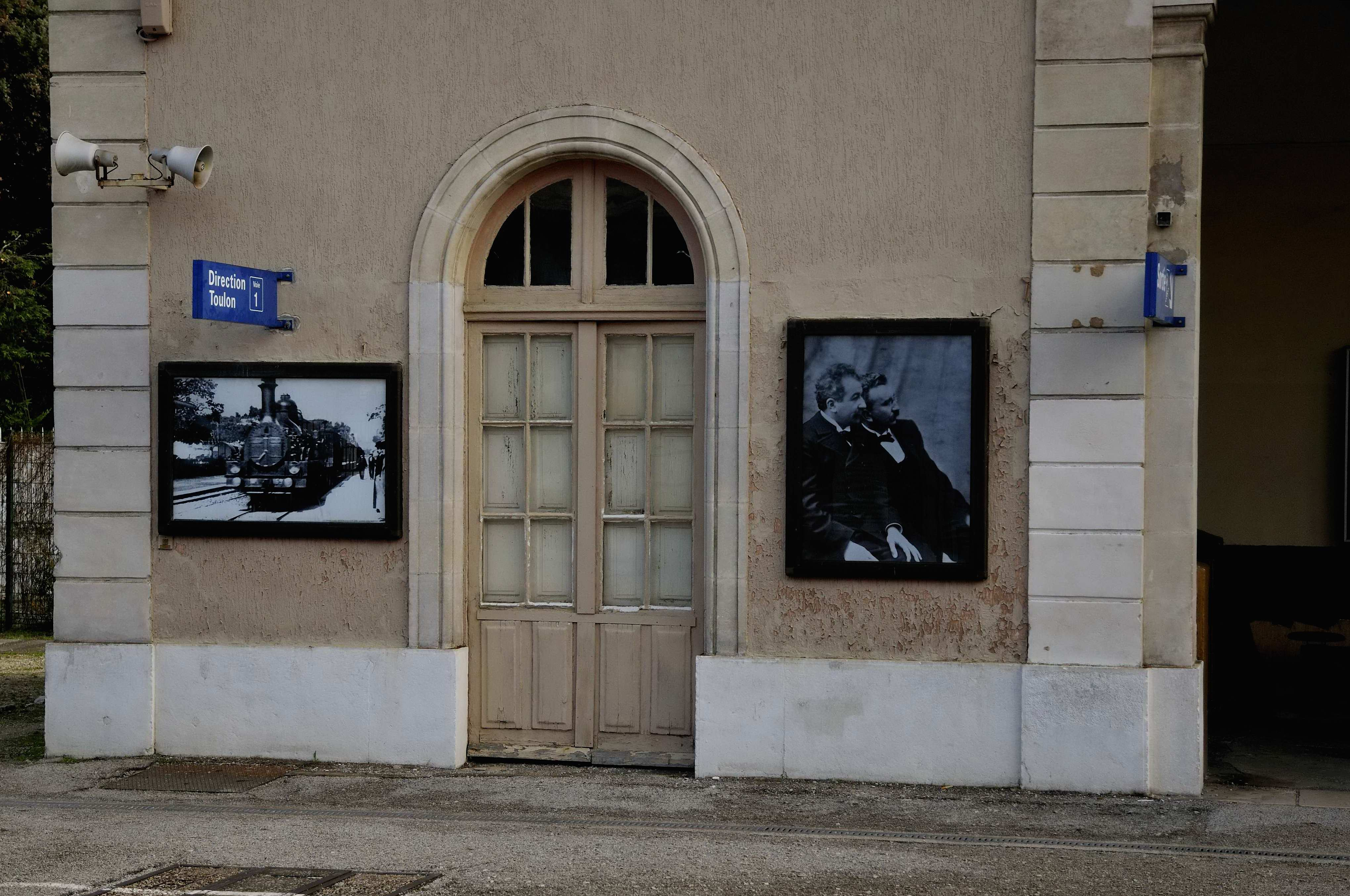
The La Ciotat train station (shown here in 2010) commemorates the film.

The short has been featured in a number of film collections, including Landmarks of Early Film volume 1. A screening of the film was depicted in the 2011 film Hugo, and the film is featured in the intro sequence of the 2013 video game Civilization V: Brave New World. The scene of the train pulling in was placed at #100 on Channel 4's two-part documentary The 100 Greatest Scary Moments.
