= Mondial la Marseillaise à Pétanque =

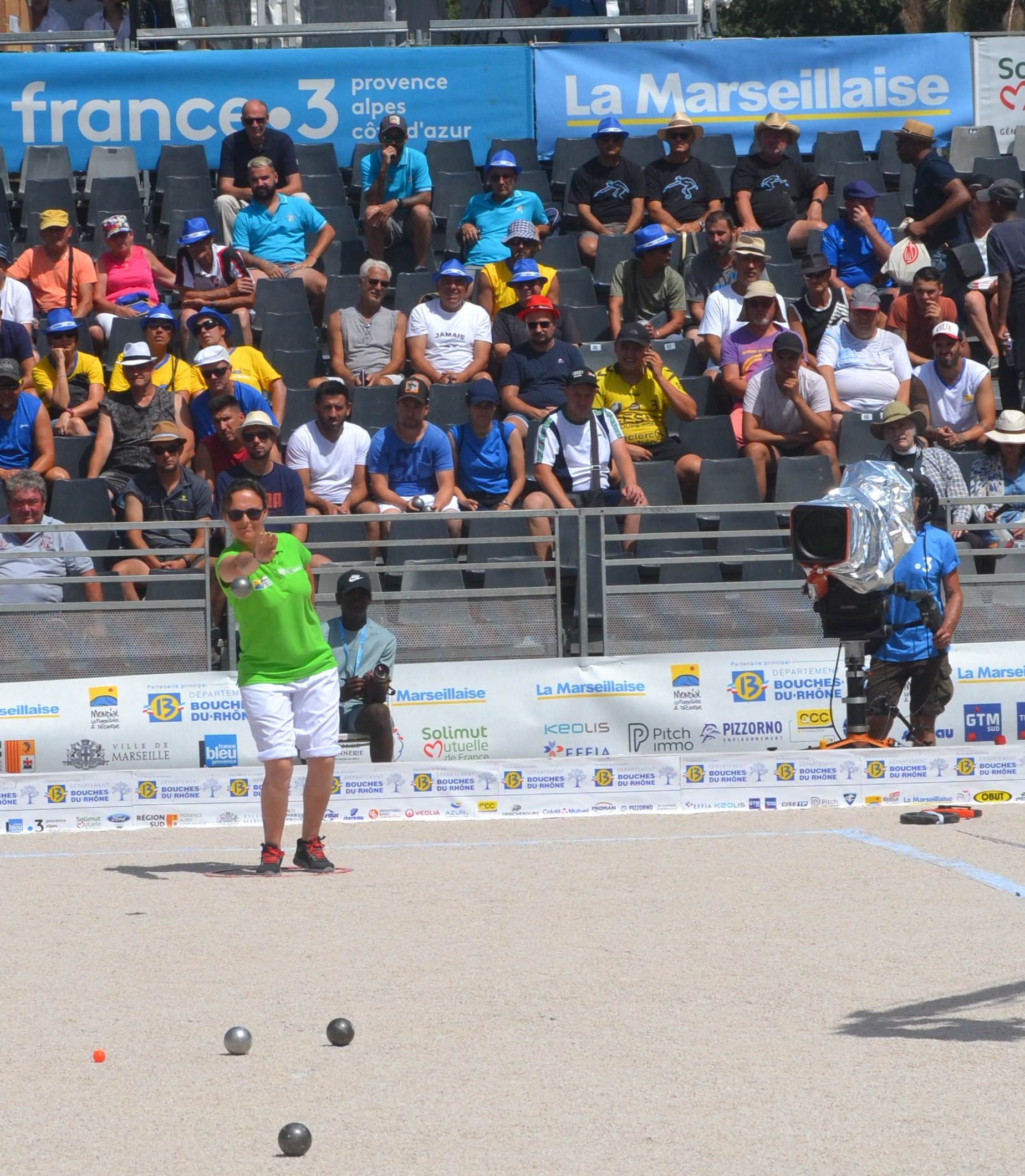
Mondial la Marseillaise à Pétanque 2022 - Nelly Peyré during the women's final

Le Mondial la Marseillaise à Pétanque (Occitan: Lo Mondial la Marseillés a Pétanca) is an international tournament of the sport of pétanque. It is held every year in July in Marseille, the biggest city in the south of France. The central location of the event is in the Parc Borély, but it now extends to many other parks and boulodromes in and around the city. In 2016, the 55th Mondial attracted around 15,000 participants and 150,000 spectators. The competition presents 3 tables: male, female and junior in mixed. Certainly, it is the biggest event in the world for pétanque, though with 15,000 players it is also most likely the biggest single sport event in the world.

The Mondial was first held in July 1961 with the support of the daily newspaper La Marseillaise, after which the event is named. Almost from the beginning it was strongly supported by Paul Ricard, the founder of Ricard, the company famous for the Ricard brand of pastis. For many years Michel Montana has been Président de l'association du Mondial La Marseillaise à Pétanque and the guiding spirit behind the event.

Many of the big games of the Mondial are televised by French TV Channel, France 3.

Note that the name of the event is Mondial "à" Pétanque, not Mondial "de" Pétanque. The word "pétanque" comes from the provençal expression à pèd tanca which means "on planted feet". In French, one says "on planted feet" (à pieds planté) just as one says "on one's knees" (à genoux). So the name of the event is Mondial "à" Pétanque— not Mondial "de" Pétanque.
