= Pétanque =

Team bowls sport where the boule is thrown, not rolled

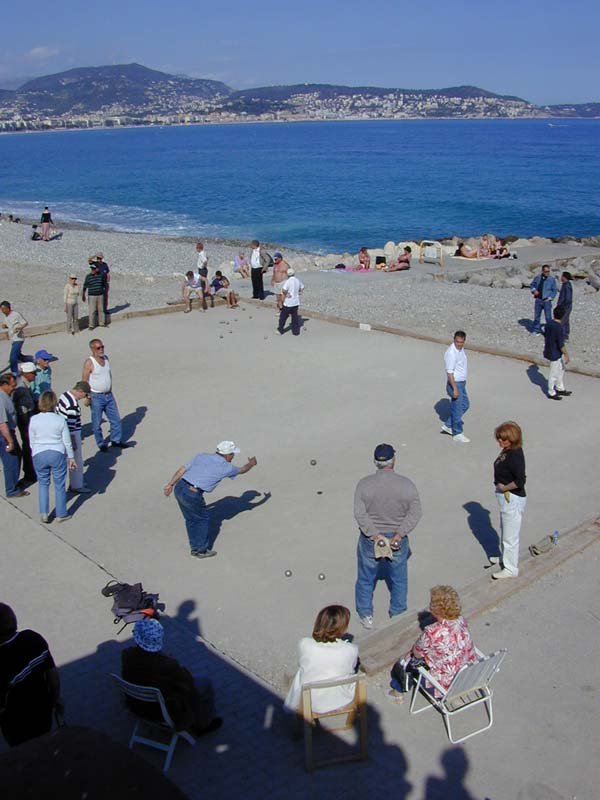
- Pétanque players on the beach in Nice, 2005
- Highest governing body: Fédération Internationale de Pétanque et Jeu Provençal
- First played: Provence, France

Characteristics
- Contact: Non-contact
- Team members: Individual, doubles and triples
- Type: Boules
- Equipment: Boules (balls) & cochonnet (little ball)

Presence
- Olympic: No
- World Games: 1985–present

Pétanque (French: [petɑ̃k], locally in Provence [peˈtãᵑkə]; Occitan: petanca [peˈtaŋkɔ]; Spanish: petanca [peˈtaŋka]; Catalan: petanca [pəˈtaŋkə]) is a sport that falls into the category of boules sports (along with raffa, bocce, boule lyonnaise, lawn bowls, and crown green bowling). In these sports, players or teams play their boules/balls towards a target ball.

In pétanque, the objective is to score points by positioning one's boules closer to the target ball than those of the opponent after all boules have been thrown. This is achieved by throwing or rolling boules closer to the small target ball, officially called a jack (French: cochonnet), or by hitting the opponents' boules away from the target, while standing inside a circle with both feet on the ground. The game is normally and best played on hard dirt or gravel. It can be played in public areas in parks or in dedicated facilities called boulodromes.

The current form of the game was codified in 1907 or 1910 in La Ciotat, in Provence, France. The French name pétanque (borrowed into English, with or without the acute accent) comes from petanca in the Provençal dialect of the Occitan language, deriving from the expression pè tancat [ˈpɛ taŋˈkat], meaning 'foot fixed' or 'foot planted' (on the ground).

== History ==
=== Invention of the game ===
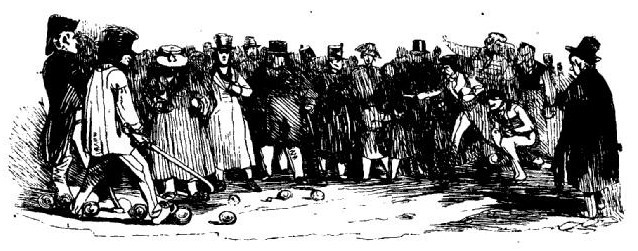
Boules players on the Champs-Élysées around 1840

Boules games have a very long history, dating back through the Middle Ages to ancient Rome, and before that to ancient Greece.

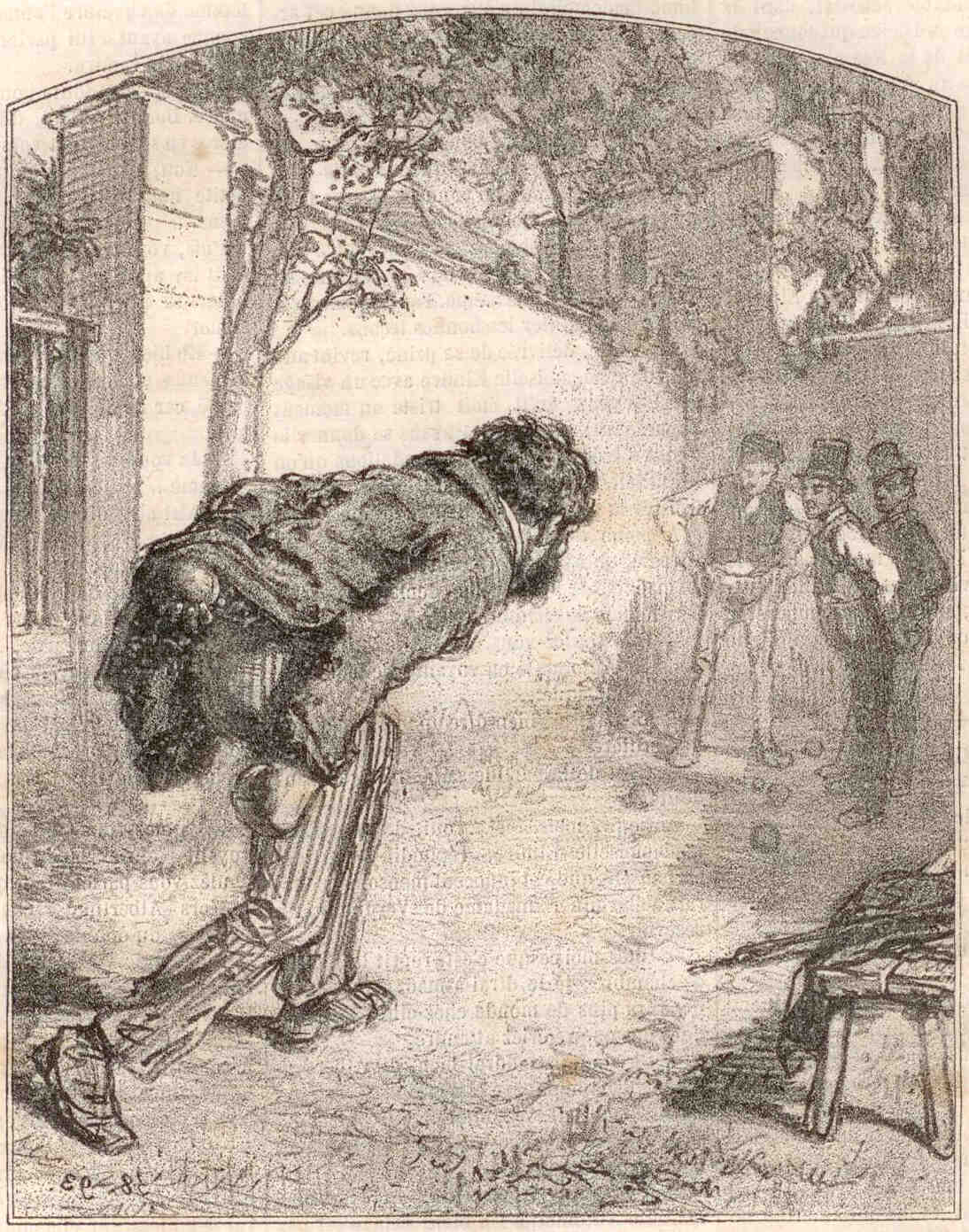
Boules player, by Paul Gavarny, 1858

In France in the second half of the 19th century, a form of boules known as jeu provençal or boule lyonnaise was extremely popular. Players rolled their boules or ran three steps in this game before throwing one. Pétanque originally developed as an offshoot or variant of jeu provençal in 1910, in what is now called the Jules Lenoir Boulodrome in the town of La Ciotat near Marseilles.

Jules Lenoir, a former jeu provençal player, suffered from such severe rheumatism that he could no longer run before throwing a boule and could scarcely stand. A good friend named Ernest Pitiot was a local café owner. To accommodate his friend Lenoir, Pitiot developed a variant form of the game in which the length of the pitch or field was reduced by roughly half, and a player, instead of running to throw a boule, stood, stationary, in a circle. They called the game pieds tanqués, "feet planted" (on the ground), a name that eventually evolved into the game's current name, pétanque.

The first pétanque tournament was organized by Ernest Pitiot and his brother Joseph Pitiot, in 1910 in La Ciotat. The game spread quickly and soon became France's most popular form of boules.

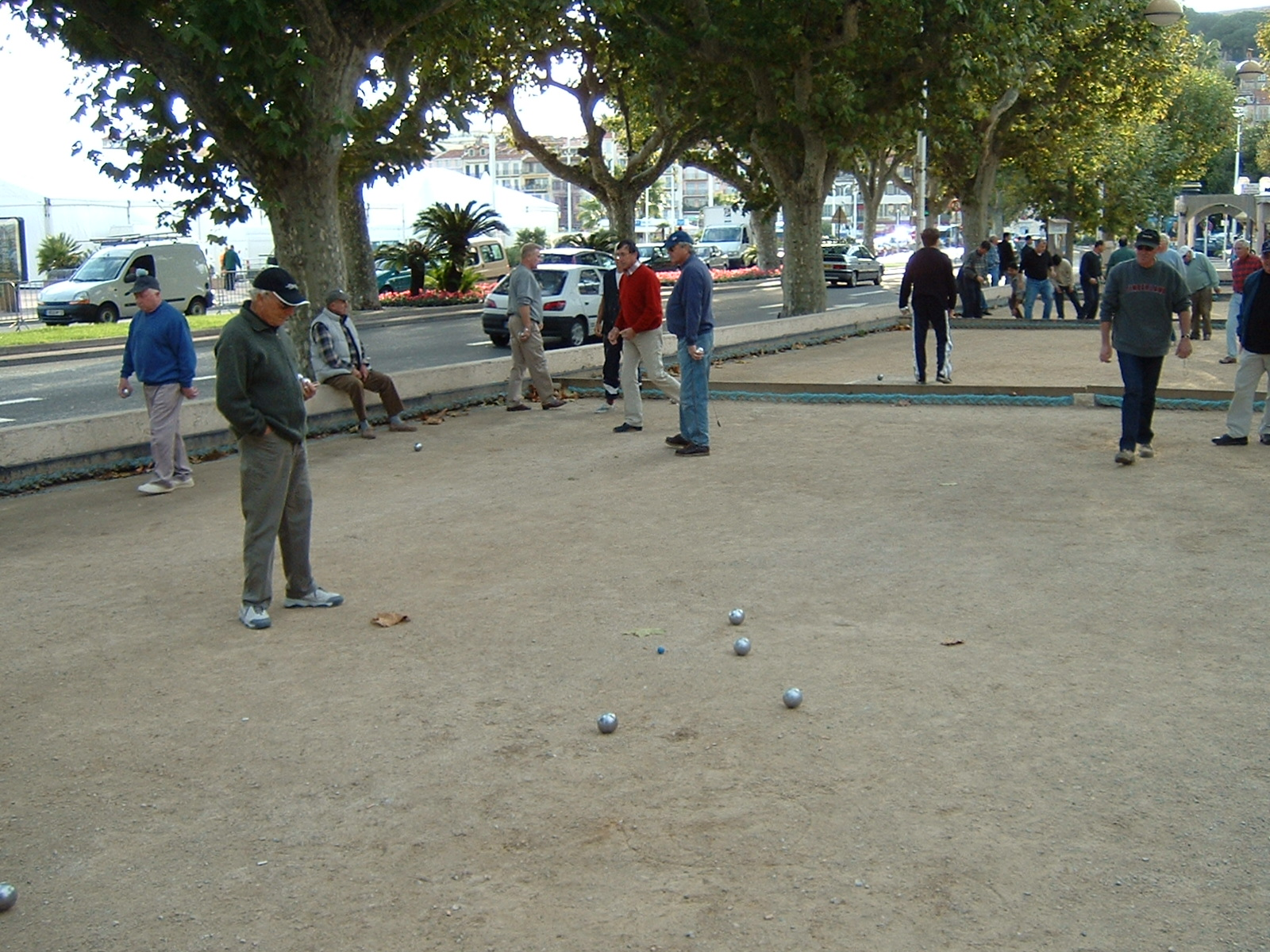
Pétanque players in Cannes

Before the mid-1800s, European boules games were played with solid wooden balls, usually made from boxwood root, a very hard wood. The late 1800s saw the introduction of cheap mass-manufactured nails, and wooden boules gradually began to be covered with nails, producing boules cloutées ("nailed boules").

After World War I, round shot manufacturing technology was adapted to allow the manufacture of hollow, all-metal boules. Paul Courtieu introduced the first all-metal boule, la Boule Intégrale, in the mid-1920s. The Intégrale was cast in a single piece from a bronze-aluminum alloy. Shortly thereafter, Jean Blanc invented a process of manufacturing steel boules by stamping two steel blanks into hemispheres and then welding the two hemispheres together to create a boule. With this technological advance, hollow all-metal balls rapidly became the norm.

=== Global spread of the game ===
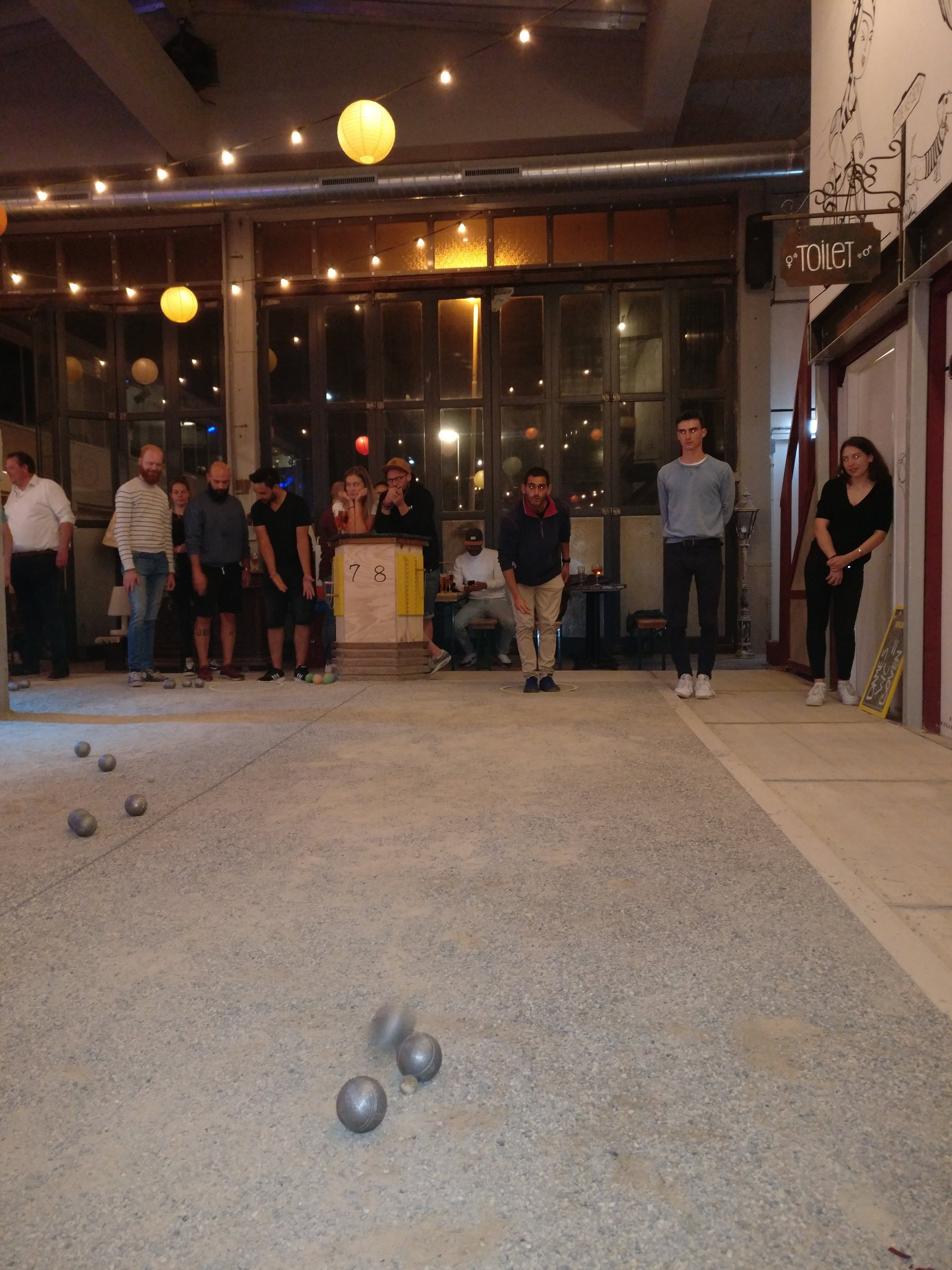
Pétanque being played indoors at an IBA reunion in Rotterdam, the Netherlands

After the development of the all-metal boule, pétanque spread rapidly from Provence to the rest of France, then to the rest of Europe, and then to Francophone colonies and countries around the globe. Today, many countries have their own national governing bodies.

In France, the Fédération Française de Pétanque et Jeu Provençal (FFPJP) has over 300,000 licensed members.

There are strong national federations in Germany, Spain and England. Pétanque is actively played in many nations with histories of French colonial influence, especially in Southeast Asia, including Laos, Thailand, Vietnam, Cambodia and Puducherry in India, as well as some parts of Africa including Madagascar.

Pétanque was featured at the 2015 All-Africa Games hosted by the Republic of the Congo, a former French colony.

Pétanque is not widely played in the Americas. There is a Canadian pétanque federation based in Québec. In the United States, the Federation of Pétanque USA (FPUSA) reports that about 30,000 play nationwide. As of 1 December 2015, FPUSA counted 2,141 members in the US, in 52 affiliated clubs.

On the international level, the governing body of pétanque is the Fédération Internationale de Pétanque et Jeu Provençal (FIPJP). It was founded in 1958 in Marseille and has almost 800,000 members as of 2022.

=== National and international competitions ===
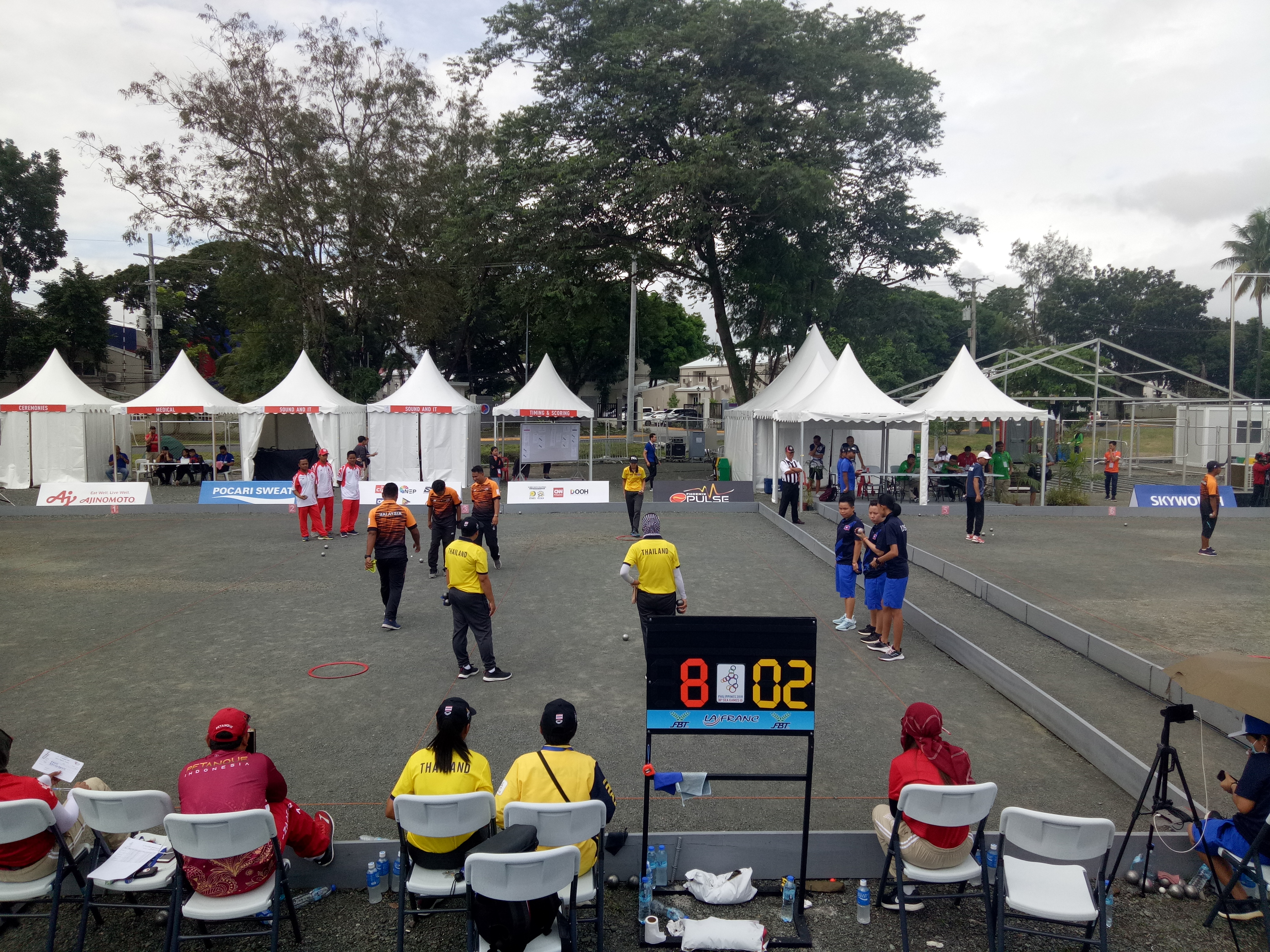
Pétanque at the 2019 Southeast Asian Games

There are a number of important world championship tournaments.

The FIPJP world championships take place every two years. Men's championships are held in even-numbered years, while Women's and Youth championships are held in odd-numbered years.

Perhaps the best-known international championship is the Mondial la Marseillaise à Pétanque, which takes place every year in Marseille, France, with more than 10,000 participants and more than 150,000 spectators.

The largest annual tournament in the United States is the Pétanque Amelia Island Open (formerly the Pétanque America Open), held in each year in November at Amelia Island, Florida.

Pétanque is not currently an Olympic sport, although the Confédération Mondiale des Sports de Boules—which was created in 1985 by several international boules organizations specifically for this purpose—has been lobbying the Olympic committee since 1985 to make it part of the Olympic Games. Pétanque has appeared in every edition of The World Games from 1985 onward. The 2022 World Games in the United States included women’s pétanque, the first time that only women's events were held as part of the boules sports programme at The World Games.

== Playing the game ==
Based on the rules of the Fédération Internationale de Pétanque & Jeu Provençal.

=== Equipment ===
Pétanque is played by two teams, each comprising one, two, or three players. Three boules are used per player in singles and doubles games, and two per player in triples games. A small wooden ball called a "jack" (cochonnet) serves as the target for the players' throws.

The area where a game of pétanque is played is called a terrain. A game can be played in an open area such as a public park, where the boundaries of the terrain are not marked, or more formally on a "marked terrain" where the terrain boundaries are marked (traditionally, by strings tightly strung between nails driven into the ground).

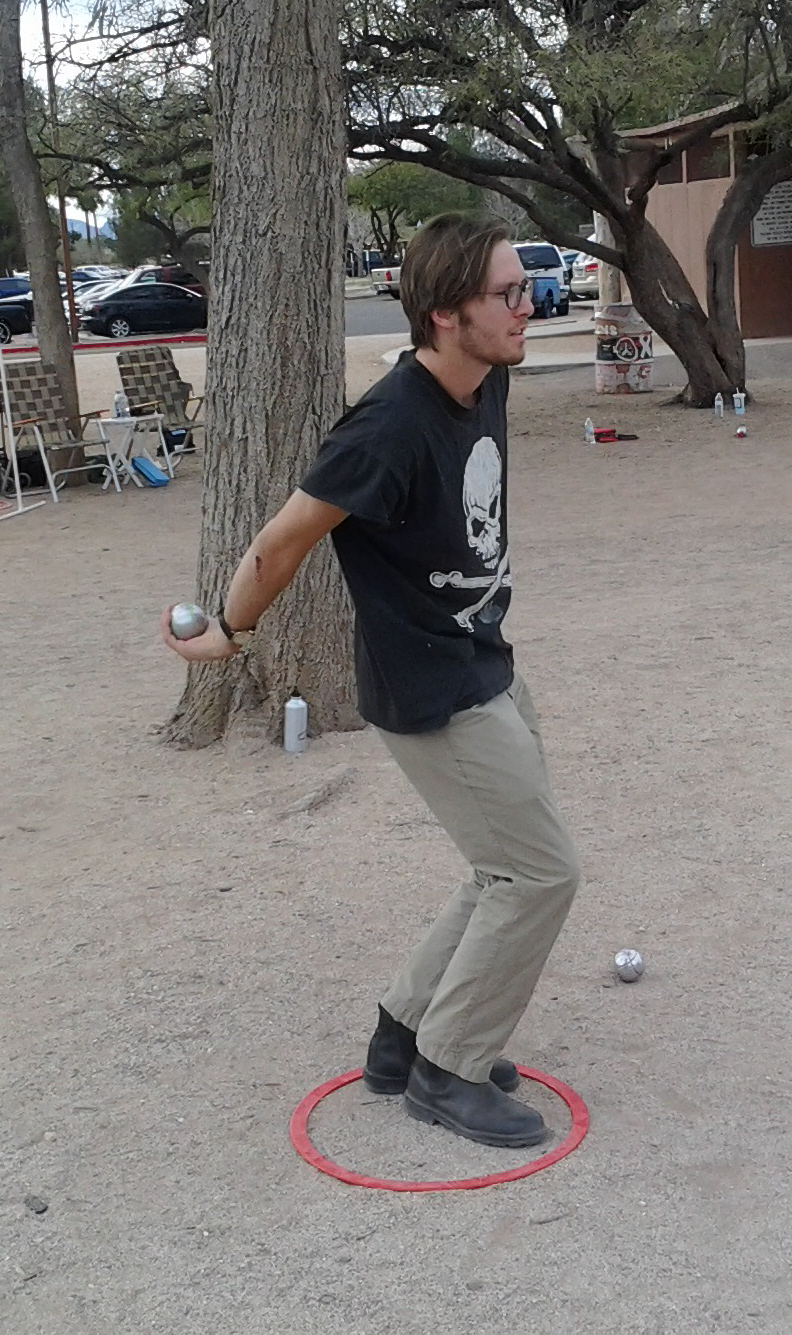
Pétanque player throwing from a prefabricated circle

In pétanque, players throw while standing in a circle (cercle). Traditionally, this was simply scratched in the dirt. From around 2005, red plastic "prefabricated" circles were introduced and are now widely used in formal games. A circle drawn on the ground must be 35–50 cm (14–20 in) in diameter, while a plastic circle must have an inside diameter of 50 cm (20 in).

=== The "ends" ===
A game consists of several "ends" (mènes). An end consists of the throwing out of the jack, followed by the two teams throwing their boules. After both teams have thrown all of their boules, the team with the boule closest to the jack wins the end.

The winning team scores one point for each of its boules that is closer than the opposing team's closest boule. Each end therefore gives the winning team a minimum of one point, and a potential maximum of six in a doubles/triples game. The first team to score 13 points wins the game.

=== Order of play ===
A coin toss is held between the teams at the start of the game. The winning team draws/places the circle, and one of its members stands inside and throws the jack to a distance of 6–10 metres (20–33 ft). One member then throws a boule, followed by a member of the opposing team. From this point on, the team whose boule is closest to the jack is said to "hold the point," and the opposing team throws the next boule. A team's turn ends upon either gaining the point or running out of boules; in the latter case, the opposing team throws all of its remaining boules.

If at any point the closest boules from each team are equidistant from the jack, then the team that threw the last boule throws again. If the boules are still equidistant after this throw, then the teams play alternately until the tie is broken. If the boules remain equidistant once the end is complete, then neither team scores any points.

The team that wins an end starts the next one. A player from the winning team draws/places a circle around the jack, stands inside, and throws the jack to start the end.

=== Scoring ===
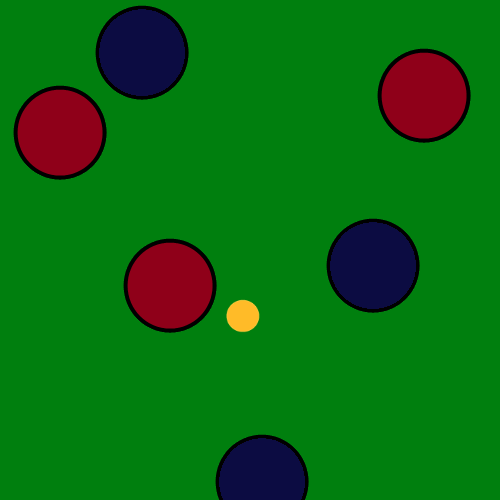
Team Red has the boule closest to the jack and the second-closest boule belongs to Team Blue. Red scores one point. Blue scores nothing.

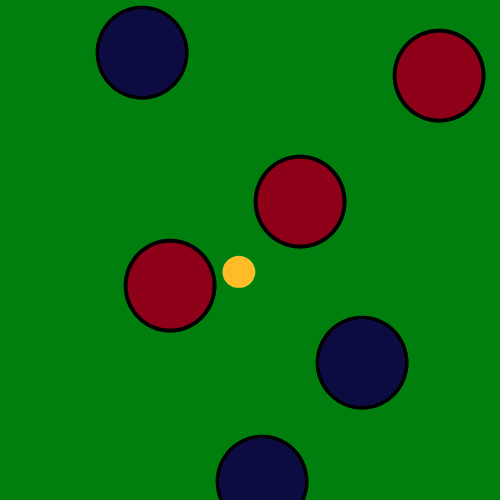
Team Red has two boules closer than Team Blue's closest boule. Red scores two points. Blue scores nothing.

An end is complete when both teams have played all of their boules, or when the jack is knocked out of play (goes "dead").

If an end is complete with the jack still in play ("live"), then the team with the boule nearest to it scores one point for each of its boules that is closer than the opposing team's nearest boule. However, neither team scores any points if their closest boules are the same distance from the jack.

If the jack is dead at the completion of an end, and if only one team still has boules to play, then that team scores one point for each unused boule. Otherwise, neither team scores.

=== Miscellaneous rules ===
- Boules can be thrown in any way that the player wishes, but the traditional way is to hold the boule with the palm of the hand downwards, and then to throw with an under-arm swing of the arm ending in an upward flick of the wrist. Throwing this way puts backspin on the boule and gives the player the maximum amount of control and flexibility when throwing.
- The boule can be rolled, thrown to a moderate height, or even thrown to a great height (a high lob or portée).
- At the beginning of an end, if the circle is drawn/placed such that the jack cannot be thrown to the maximum distance of 10 metres (33 ft), then the player throwing the jack may move the circle back to a point that allows this distance to be reached.
- If a boule or jack lands on/near a boundary line such that any portion of it is within the playing area when viewed from directly above, it is considered to be live. It must completely cross the line in order to be declared dead.

== Equipment specifications ==
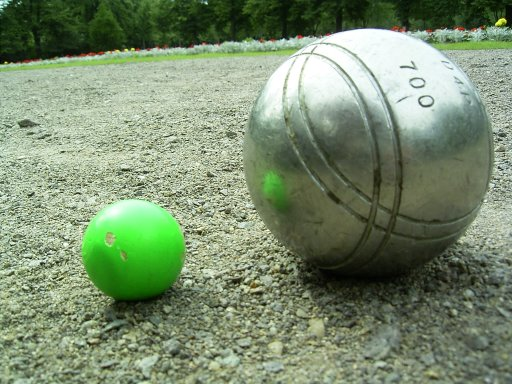
Jack (cochonnet) and boule

=== Boules ===
Leisure boules are boules that do not meet the FIPJP standards for competition boules, but are less expensive than competition boules and completely adequate for "backyard" games. Unlike competition boules, leisure boules are a "one size fits all" affair—they come in one weight and size.

Competition boules must meet specifications set by the FIPJP. They must be hollow and made of metal (usually steel) with a diameter between 70.5 and 80 mm (2.78 and 3.15 in) and a weight between 650 and 800 g (23 and 28 oz). When purchasing competition boules, a purchaser has a choice of a number of characteristics, including the size, weight, and hardness of the boules, as well as the striations (patterned grooves on the surface of the boules).

=== Jack ===
The jack, or target ball, is a small ball made of wood, traditionally boxwood or beechwood, 30 mm (1.2 in) in diameter. In the past, jacks were often left "natural"—unfinished or with a clear finish—but nowadays they are often painted in bright colours. In French, the jack is known by a variety of names, including but (goal or target), cochonnet (piglet), bouchon ("little ball" in Provençal language, not related to the French word "bouchon" that designates a cork or bung), le petit (the little one), and gari ("rat", also in Provençal language).

=== Playing area ===
Pétanque can be played on almost any flat, open space. The ground may be irregular and interrupted by trees or rocks, and the surface is likely to be uneven, with some areas hard and smooth and other areas rough and stony. When an area is constructed specifically for the purposes of playing pétanque, the playing surface is typically loose gravel, decomposed granite, brick grog or crushed sea shell. Sandy beaches are not suitable, although light plastic boules are sometimes used to adapt the game for the beach. There is no requirement for backboards or sideboards (as in bocce), but dedicated playing areas are often enclosed in boards or some other structural barrier.

In France, village squares and park pathways are often used as pétanque playing areas. In addition, many towns have recreational facilities (boulodromes) constructed specifically for playing pétanque.

An area where a single pétanque game is played is called a terrain. A "playing area" (aire de jeu) is an area containing one or more terrains. For tournaments, a large playing area is subdivided and marked off (typically using nails and string) into rectangular marked terrains (also known as "lanes" (cadres) or "pistes") so that multiple games may be carried on simultaneously. For tournament play, a marked terrain is a rectangle at least 4 metres (13 ft) wide and 15 metres (49 ft) long.

== Strategy ==
=== Pointing and shooting ===
Generally speaking, a player throws a boule with one of two objectives:

- To make the boule come to rest in a particular spot, usually as close as possible to the jack. This is called pointing.
- To make the boule directly hit an opponent's boule with the aim of knocking it away from the jack. This is called shooting.

The best throw is called a carreau. It is a shot that knocks away the opponent's boule, leaving the thrown boule exactly in its place.

Players who are skillful enough to shoot effectively are called "shooters" (tireurs); players who usually point are called "pointers" (pointeurs). As a matter of strategy, pointers play first and shooters are held in reserve in case the opponents place well. Good pointing is what scores points, but national and international championships are usually dominated by skillful shooters, who target any opposing boule that comes close to scoring.

=== Throwing a boule ===
Some strategic considerations involved in the throw of a boule include:

- A traditional maxim is boule devant, boule d'argent ("A ball in front is a money ball."). A boule located closer to the player than the jack ("in front of the jack") is much more valuable than one behind the jack. A boule in front blocks the opposing team from easy access to the jack, and it may also (intentionally or accidentally) be hit and pushed closer to the jack.
- If a player points a boule very close to the jack, it forces the opposing shooter to shoot it immediately. This may prove to be a disadvantage to a pointer who wants to keep that boule, or it can be advantageous if the pointer is trying to force the opposing shooter to exhaust their supply of boules.
- It is generally a bad idea for a player to shoot with their team's last boule. In most cases, the better strategy is to "limit the damage" by pointing the team's last boule close enough to the jack to limit the opposing team's gains to a single point.

=== Throwing the jack ===
Strategic considerations involved in the throw of the jack include:

- Throwing the jack to a distance at which the thrower's shooter teammate is comfortable, or at which the opposing team's shooter is not comfortable.
- Aiming for a spot on the terrain that the thrower's pointer teammates prefer, or that will cause difficulty for the opposing team's pointers.
- Avoiding predictable/repetitious behavior by changing distance and target position for each new throw.

== Glossary of special terms ==
In the following glossary, the French word or phrase is given in brackets unless it is the same:

- join battle (arriver a bataille). When both teams have 10 or 11 points and the game may go either way on each lead.
- bombard. To shoot or strike an opponent's boules one after another, after they had taken the lead.
- boule devant, boule d'argent. "A ball in front is a money ball". This maxim reminds players that when pointing, the most valuable place for a boule is in front of the jack. In that location, it prevents opponents from throwing directly toward the jack, and hitting it will push it even closer to the jack.
- jack (but, also bouchon, cochonnet, petit, gari or kiki). The small wooden or plastic target ball.
- carambolage Shot that knocks away several boules. Literally "pile-up".
- circle (cercle or rond). The marked area from within which the boules are thrown.
- demarquer ("unscore"). To drop a point when pointing or shooting.
- fuser. A boule that bounces off course.
- have the point. A team is said to "have the point" if one of its boules is closer to the jack than any of the opposing team's boules. A team that has the point is basically in a winning position, so the team that does NOT have the point throws the next boule and attempts to gain the point.
- mène. "End" i.e. the period of play from the throw of a jack to the point when both teams have played all their boules.
- point To throw one's boule with the intent of stopping near the jack (also known as placing).
- pousette. A shot that pushes one's team's boules nearer the jack; or to that pushes the jack.
- shoot To throw one's boule at an opponent's boule (or at the jack) in an attempt to knock it out of play. When the opposing team has a boule positioned very close to the jack, often the best strategy is to attempt to shoot it. A team in a desperate situation may attempt to save itself by shooting the jack out of bounds.
- lob (portée) A boule thrown in a high arc so that when it lands it only rolls a short distance.
- carreau (pronounced carrow). A shot that knocks an opposing boule away from the jack and replaces it (in very nearly the same spot) with the thrower's own boule. Basically, the perfect shot.

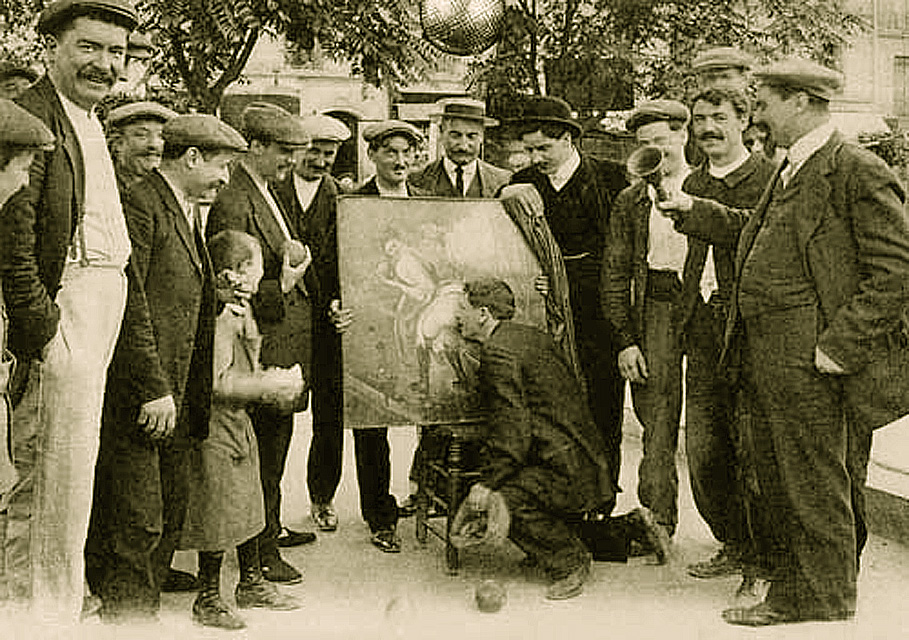
A man kissing Fanny

- fanny (mettre fanny). To lose a game without scoring any points; a shutout game. It's rare, but when a player or a team loses 13 to 0, he is said to fanny ("il est fanny", he's fanny, or "il a fait fanny", he made fanny) and must kiss the bottom of a girl named Fanny. Virtually everywhere in Provence where pétanque is played, you will find a picture, woodcarving or pottery figure of a bare-bottomed young woman named Fanny. Often, the team that "made fanny" has to buy a round of drinks for the winning team ("Fanny paie à boire !", "the fanny pays for the drinks!").

== Image gallery ==
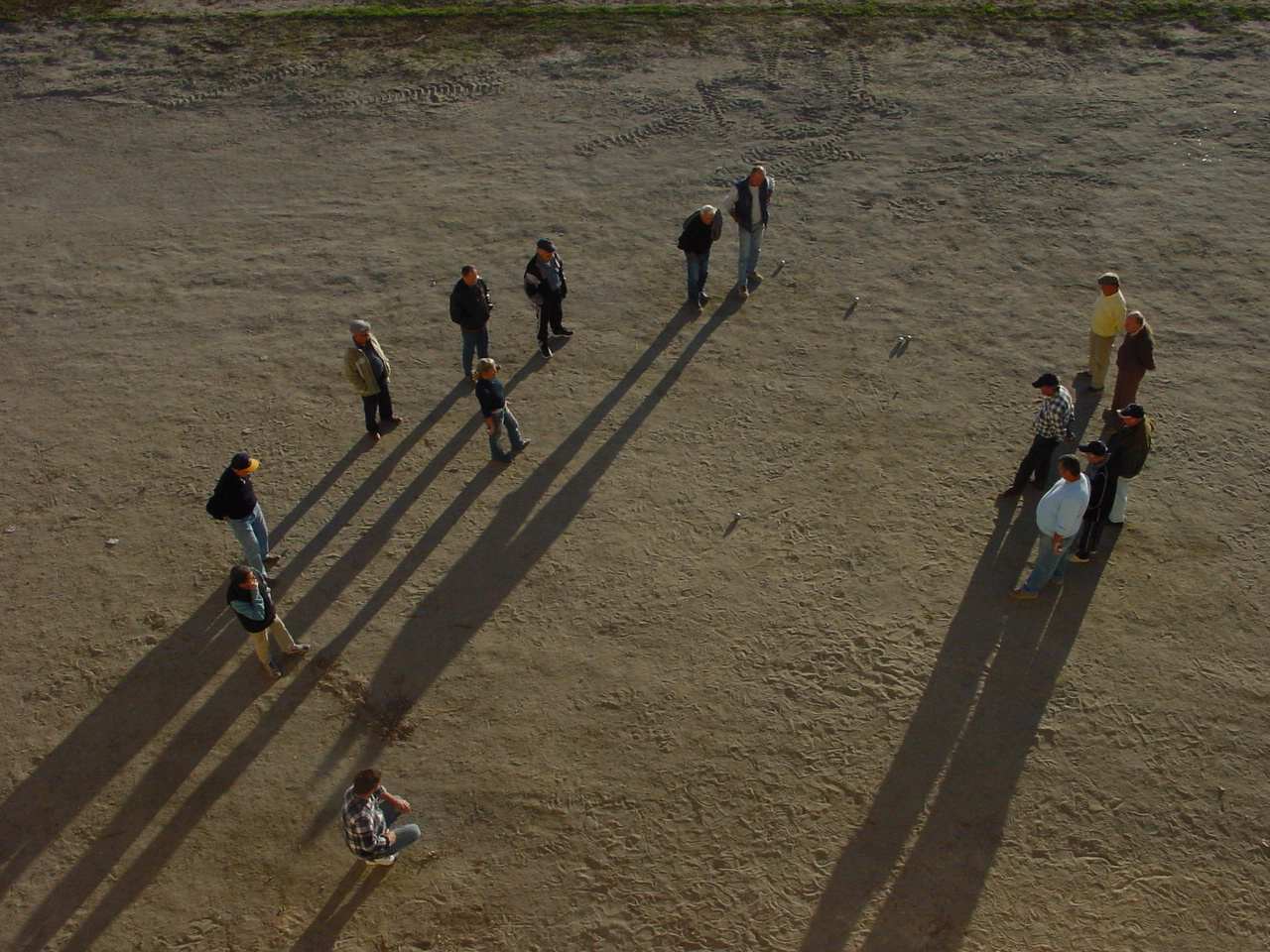
Playing pétanque in the late afternoon at Aigues-Mortes

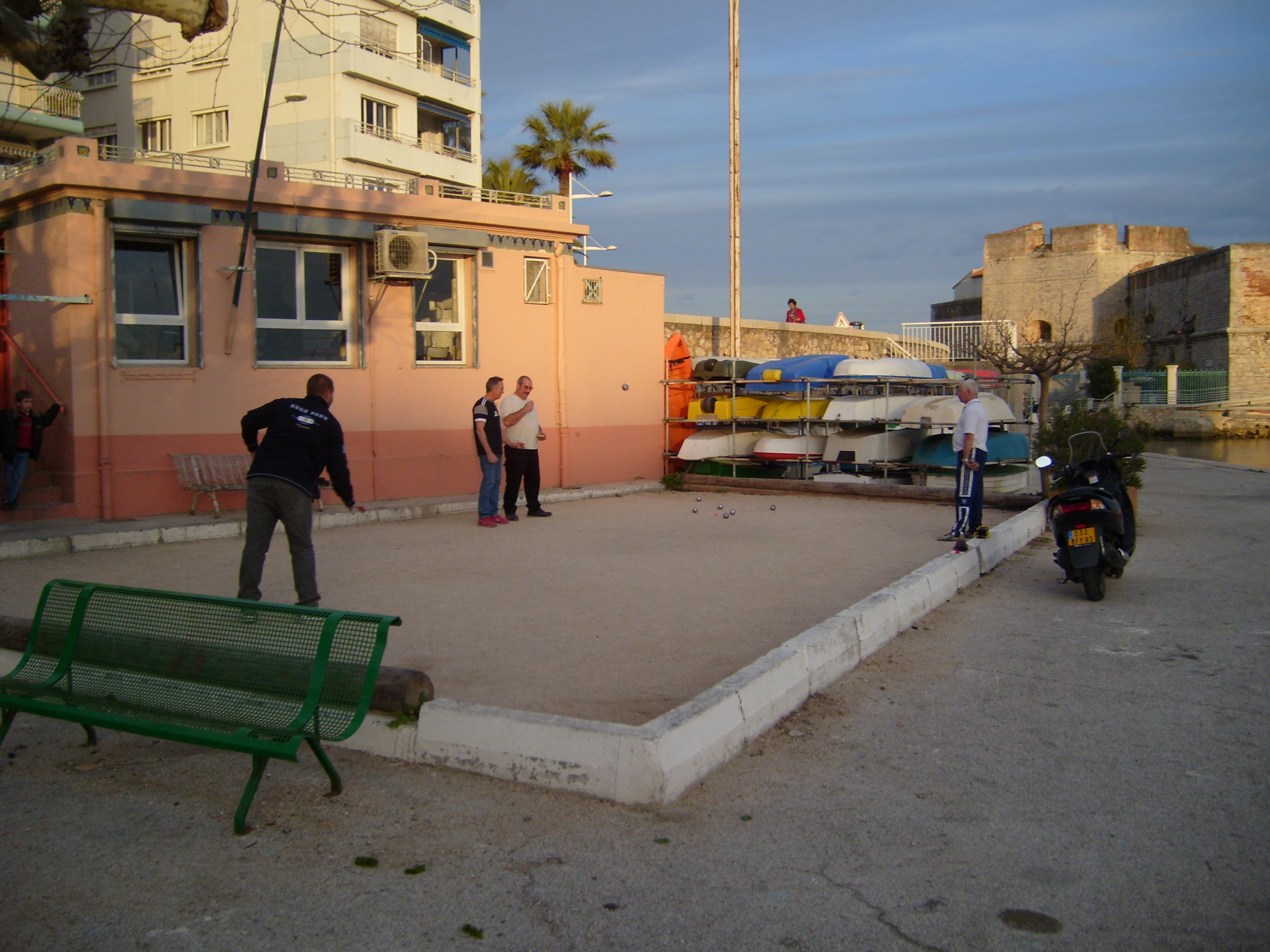
Men playing pétanque next to the Fort St. Louis in Toulon.

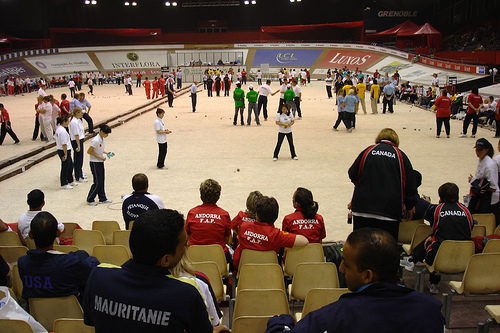
The 2006 Pétanque World Championship in Grenoble, France

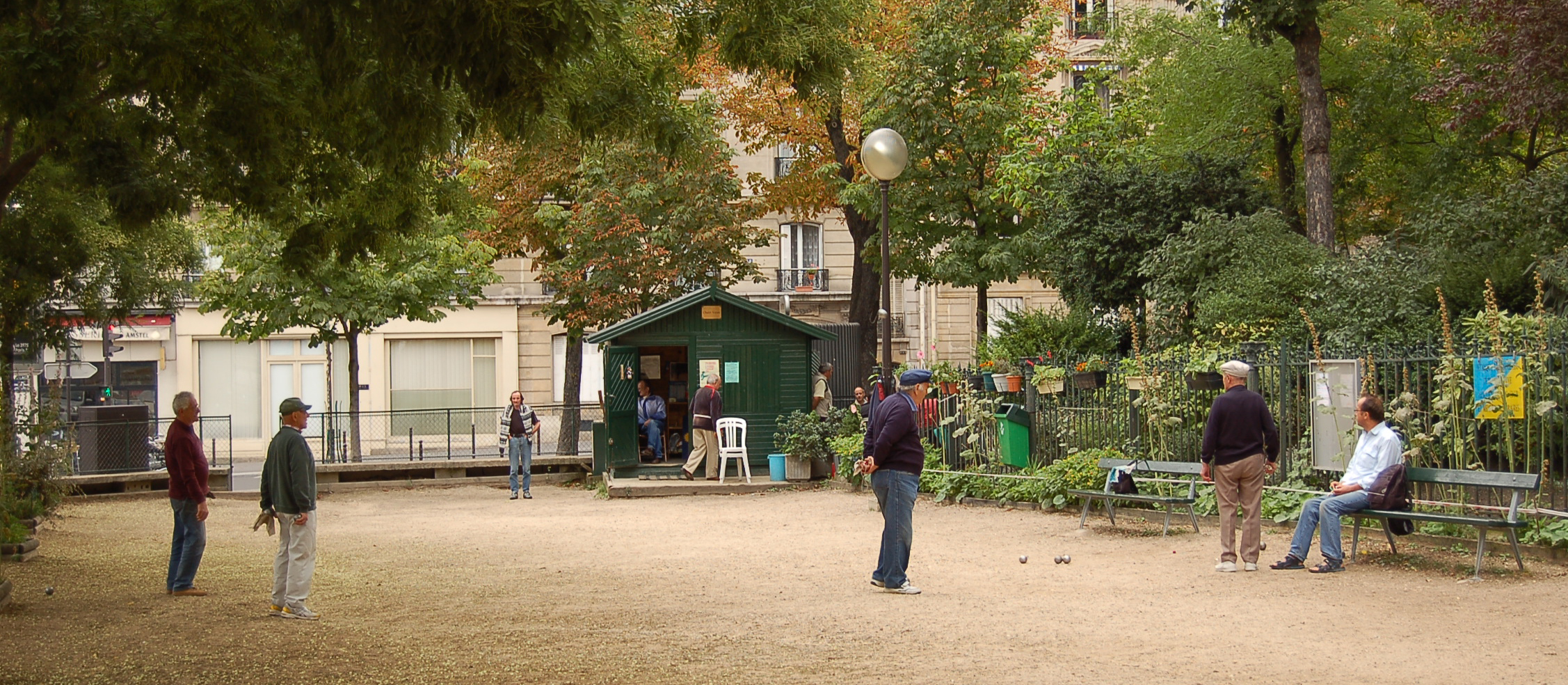
Action on the Pétanque field in Batignolles.

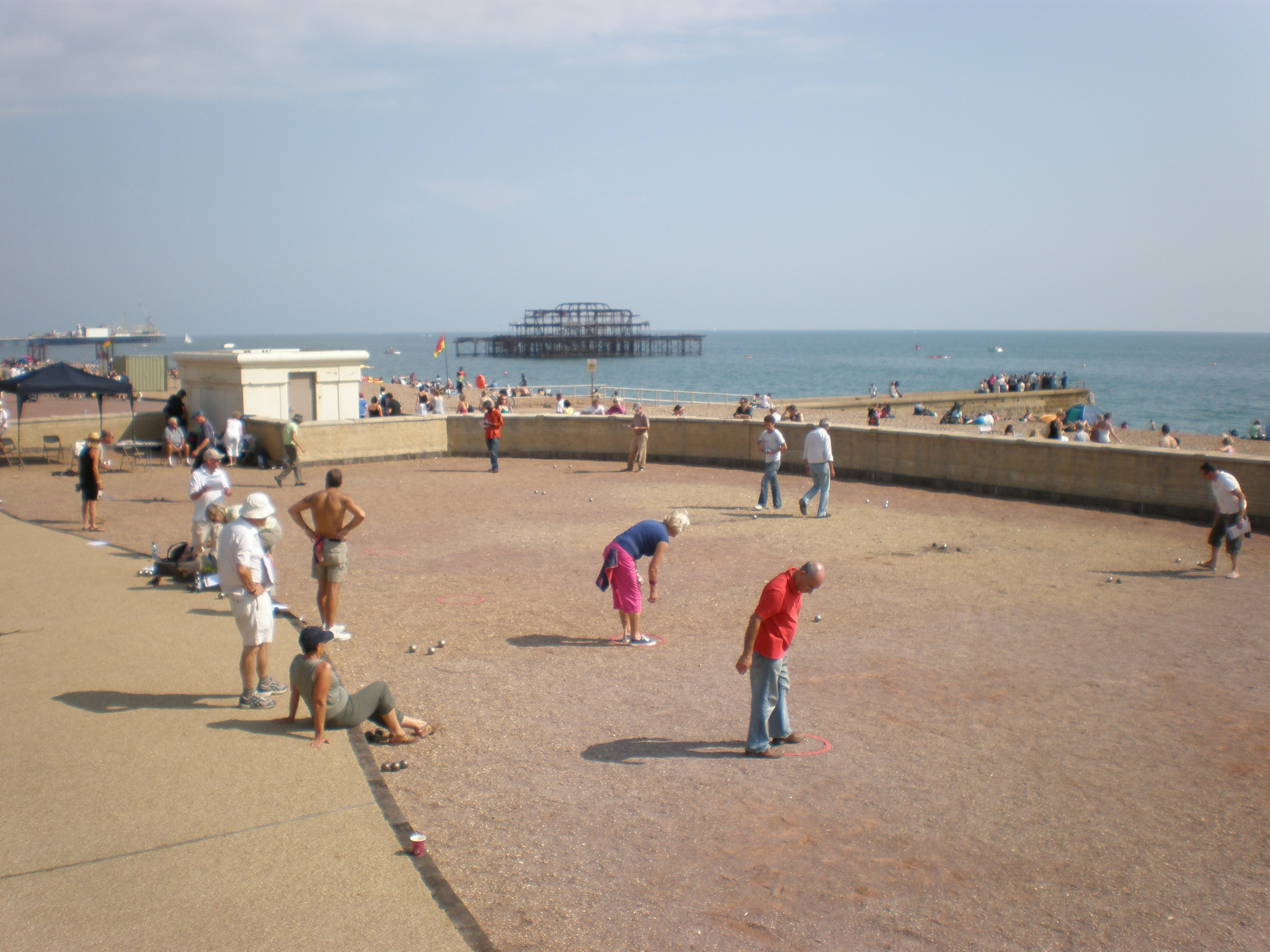
Players of the Brighton & Hove Pétanque Club on the Peace Statue Terrain, Brighton & Hove, UK

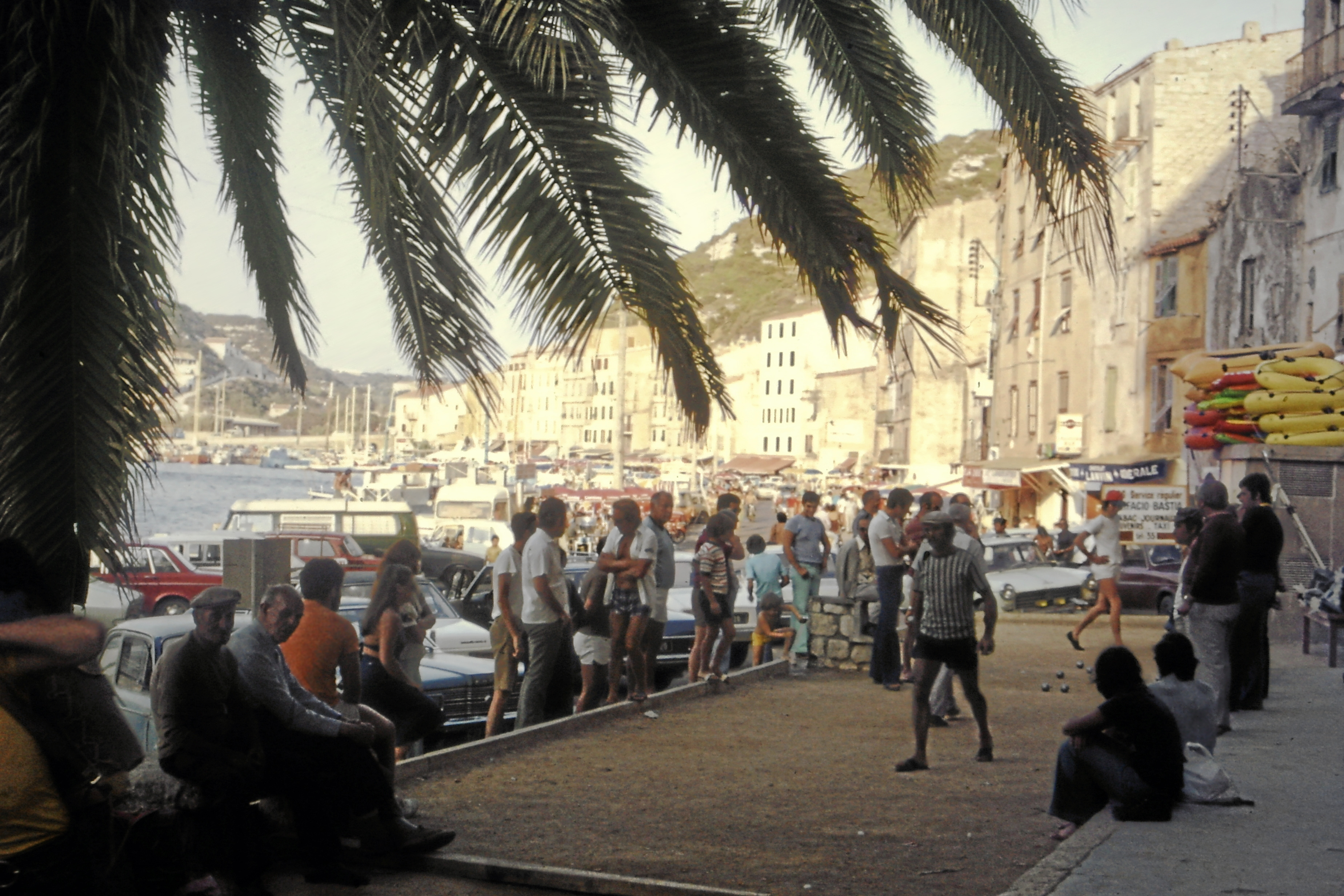
Pétanque players at the port of Bonifacio in 1975

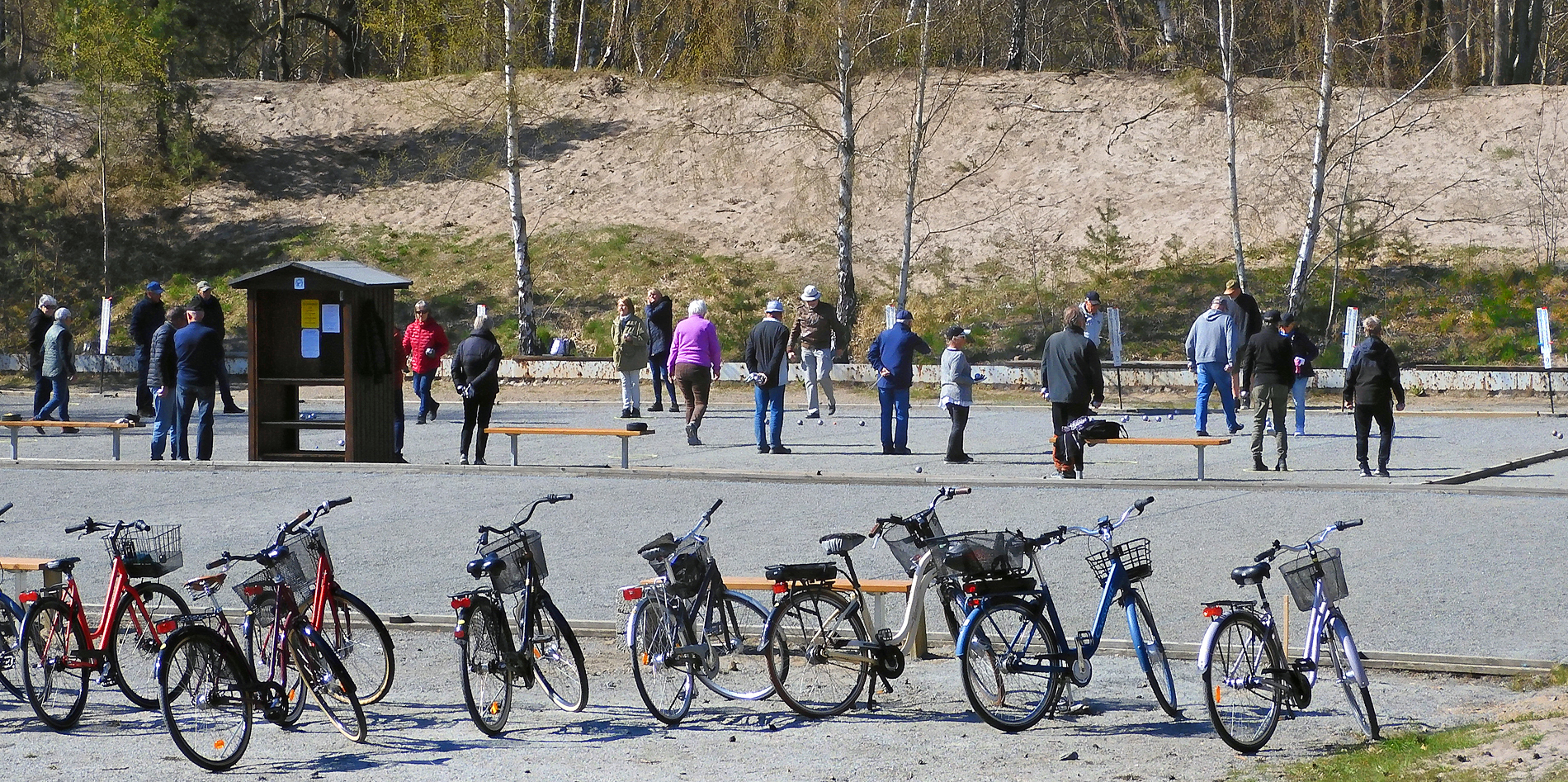
Pétanque is a popular game among pensioners, here in Ystad 2022.

== See also ==
- Boules
- Bocce
- Boccia
- Curling
- Kubb, a Swedish throwing game
- Bowls
- Bolas criollas
- Pétanque World Championships
- Mondial la Marseillaise à Pétanque
- Swedish pétanque championships
- Tejo
