= Uncle Josh at the Moving Picture Show =

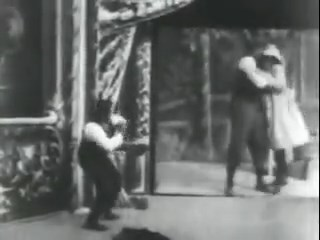
- Directed by: Edwin S. Porter
- Starring: Charles Manley
- Cinematography: Edwin S. Porter
- Production company: Edison Manufacturing Company
- Release date: 27 January 1902
- Running time: 2 minutes
- Country: United States of America
- Language: Silent

Uncle Josh at the Moving Picture Show is a 1902 American short silent comedy film directed by Edwin S. Porter, featuring a naive spectator trying to interact with films projected onto a screen. It is an almost identical remake of a British 1901 film directed by Robert W. Paul, The Countryman and the Cinematograph. Paul's film was the first to feature a film shown within a film.

== Plot ==
Uncle Josh at the Moving Picture Show (1902)

A man is sitting in a box at a cinema theatre. The screening starts with the title The Edison Projecting Kinetoscope followed by the intertitle Parisian Danger showing a girl dancing the can-can. The man jumps out of his box and starts imitating her dance. The second intertitle, The Black Diamond Express then appears and the film shows a train rushing towards the camera. The man is so afraid that he jumps back in his loge. The third film, The Country Couple, is then shown and when the spectator sees a couple kissing, he goes back on stage and tears up the screen, revealing the movie projector and projectionist behind it. The projectionist stands up and gives the spectator a beating.

== Analysis ==
There are a number of differences between this film and the British original. Firstly, it is the third of a series of films directed by Edwin S. Porter featuring the character of Uncle Josh, played by Charles Manley. The others were, in 1900, Uncle Josh's Nightmare and Uncle Josh in a Spooky Hotel. Uncle Josh Weathersby was a character, created onstage by Cal Stewart, who lived in a mythical New England farming town called "Punkin Center". Edison had recorded several cylinders of Cal Stewart's very successful speeches and songs before producing these films.

The staging of Porter's version is a bit different from the 1901 version, with a slightly wider frame showing a stage with a box to the left and larger than life characters on the screen while they are lifesize in the 1901 version. Porter's version, to the difference of the 1901 film, includes a title and three intertitles for the three films within the film. The general title The Edison Projecting Kinetoscope is a kind of advertisement for this innovation recently introduced by Edison to replace the Kinetoscope parlors, following the success of the Lumière brothers' cinematograph.

The second film within the film is a clear reference to the Lumière brothers' 1895 film, L'Arrivée d'un train en gare de La Ciotat (known in the United States as The Arrival of a Train at La Ciotat Station, Arrival of a Train at La Ciotat or The Arrival of the Mail Train, and in the United Kingdom as Train Pulling into a Station) and the panic reaction it allegedly caused in the audience.

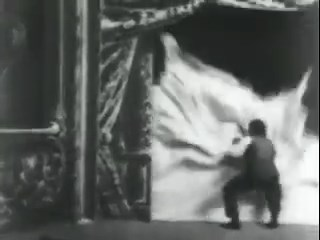

Porter used double exposure to add the films after having filmed the spectator next to a black background. This also made it possible to use the same actor as spectator and actor in the third film where he wants to confront his doppelgänger. At the end, stop-motion is used to replace the black background by a white sheet which is torn by the spectator.

This film and the British film which inspired it have been regarded as a celebrated document of the learning process of the public regarding cinema; according to Miriam Hansen, "The proper relations among viewers, projector and the screen, the peculiar dimensions of cinematic space, were part of a cultural practice that had to be learned".

== See also ==
- Edwin S. Porter filmography
