= Hôtel de Ville, La Ciotat =

Town hall in La Ciotat, France

Hôtel de Ville
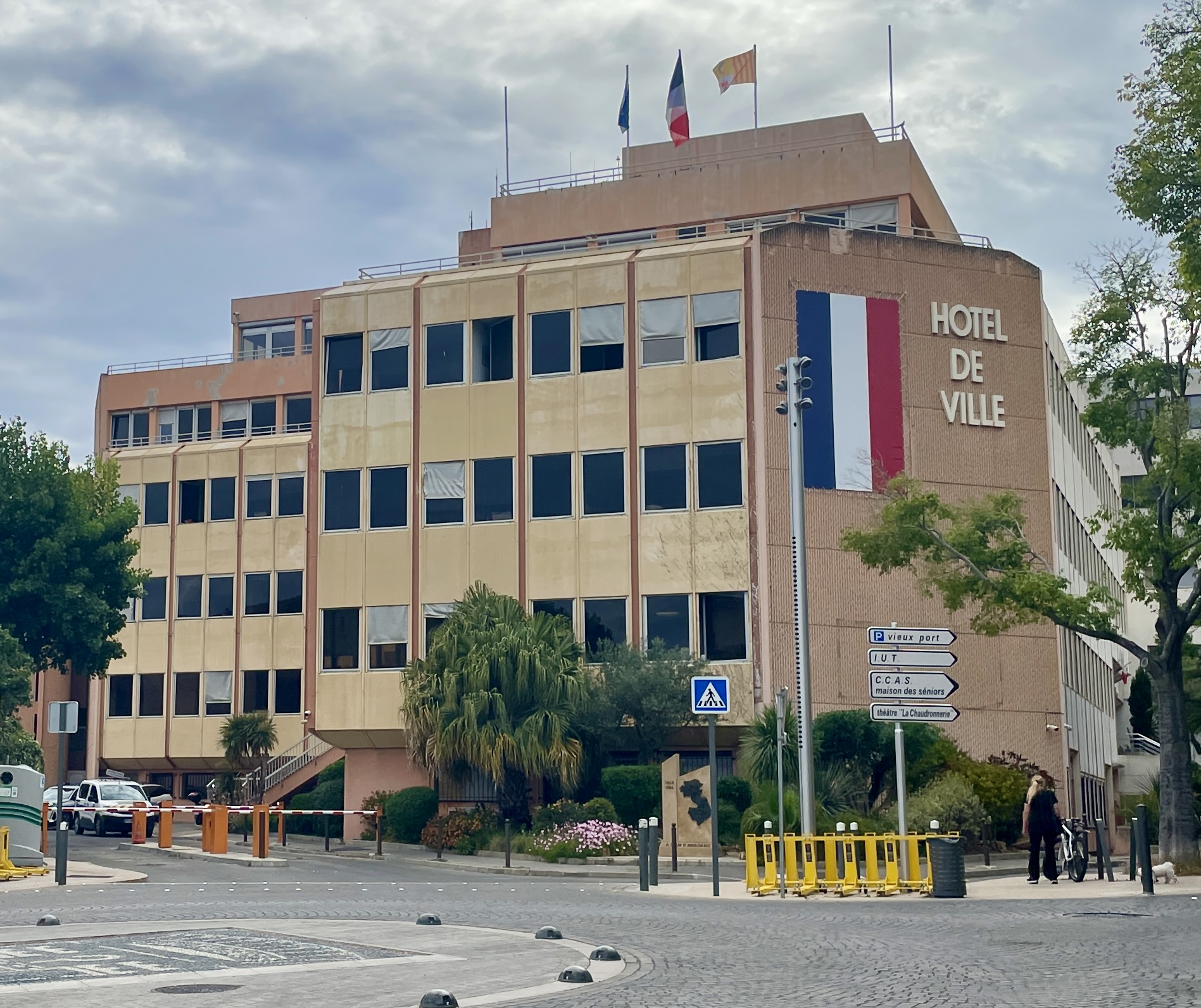
- The main frontage of the Hôtel de Ville in May 2024
- Interactive map of the Hôtel de Ville area

General information
- Type: City hall
- Architectural style: Modern style
- Location: La Ciotat, France
- Coordinates: 43.1736°N 5.6051°E
- Completed: 1978

The Hôtel de Ville (French pronunciation: [otɛl də vil], City Hall) is a municipal building in La Ciotat, Bouches-du-Rhône, in southeastern France, standing on Rond point des Messageries Maritimes. It has been included on the Inventaire général des monuments by the French Ministry of Culture since 2015.

== History ==
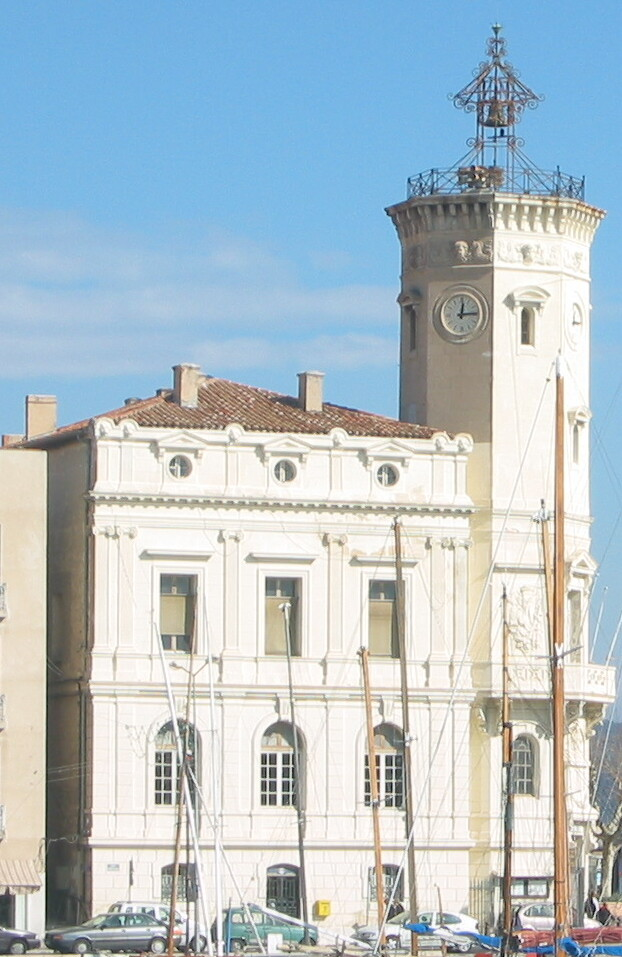
The old town hall

Following the French Revolution, meetings of the town council were originally held in the house of the mayor at the time. This arrangement continued until the early 1860s, when the town council led by the mayor, Antoine Chabaud, decided to commission a dedicated town hall. The site they selected was triangular with its main frontages on Quai Ganteaume and Boulevard Anatole France. The new building was designed by Auguste Martin in the Renaissance Revival style, built in ashlar stone and was completed in 1864.

The design involved a five-stage octagonal belfry, which was 26 metres (85 ft) high, at the corner of the two streets. There was a doorway with a cornice in the first stage, a heraldic shield in the second stage, a French door with a triangular pediment and a balcony flanked by bas-reliefs in the third stage, a small round headed window with a segmental pediment in the fourth stage and a clock in the fifth stage, all surmounted by a modillioned cornice and a wrought iron bell tower. The street elevations were fenestrated with segmental headed windows on the ground floor, round headed windows with moulded surrounds and keystones on the first floor, casement windows with cornices on the second floor and oculi with triangular pediments at attic level. The bays were flanked by banded Doric order pilasters on the first floor, fluted Ionic order pilasters on the second floor and fluted Doric order pilasters surmounted by lions' heads at attic level. The pieces of sculpture, including the heraldic shield, the bas-reliefs and the lions' heads, were all undertaken by Émile Aldebert.

In August 1932, a plaque was attached to the old town hall to commemorate the centenary of the visit by the statesman, Alphonse de Lamartine, to the town. Following the liberation of the town on 20 August 1944, during the Second World War, the bodies of nearly 20 members of the French Resistance who had been killed by German troops were repatriated to the town. A large funeral procession passed by the old town hall on the way to the local cemetery on 1 November 1944. After serving as a municipal building until 1991, the old town hall was converted for use as a local history museum, opening in that use in 1992. Items assembled by the museum curators included local archaeological remains, maritime memorabilia and artefacts associated with the Lumière brothers.

In the late 1980s, following significant population growth, the council decided to acquire a more substantial municipal building. The building they selected, on Rond point des Messageries Maritimes, was the former head office of a shipbuilding company, Messageries Maritimes. The site had been occupied by the Couvent des Bernardines (the convent of the Bernadines) since the mid-17th century. The property operated as Cistercian convent until it was seized by the state and the nuns driven out in September 1792. After being used as a cotton spinning workshop, it was acquired by the son of a wealthy shipbuilder, Louis Benet, in 1835. He established a shipyard there and then sold the business to Messageries Maritimes in 1849.

In the 1970s, after substantial expansion, the company, by then known as Chantiers Navals de La Ciotat (CNC), decided to replace their old head office on the site. The new building was designed in the modern style, built in concrete and glass and was completed in 1978. However, because of competition from Asia, the shipyard went into decline and ultimately closed in July 1988. The town council then acquired the former head office building for use as the new town hall in 1991.
