= Tejo (Argentina) =

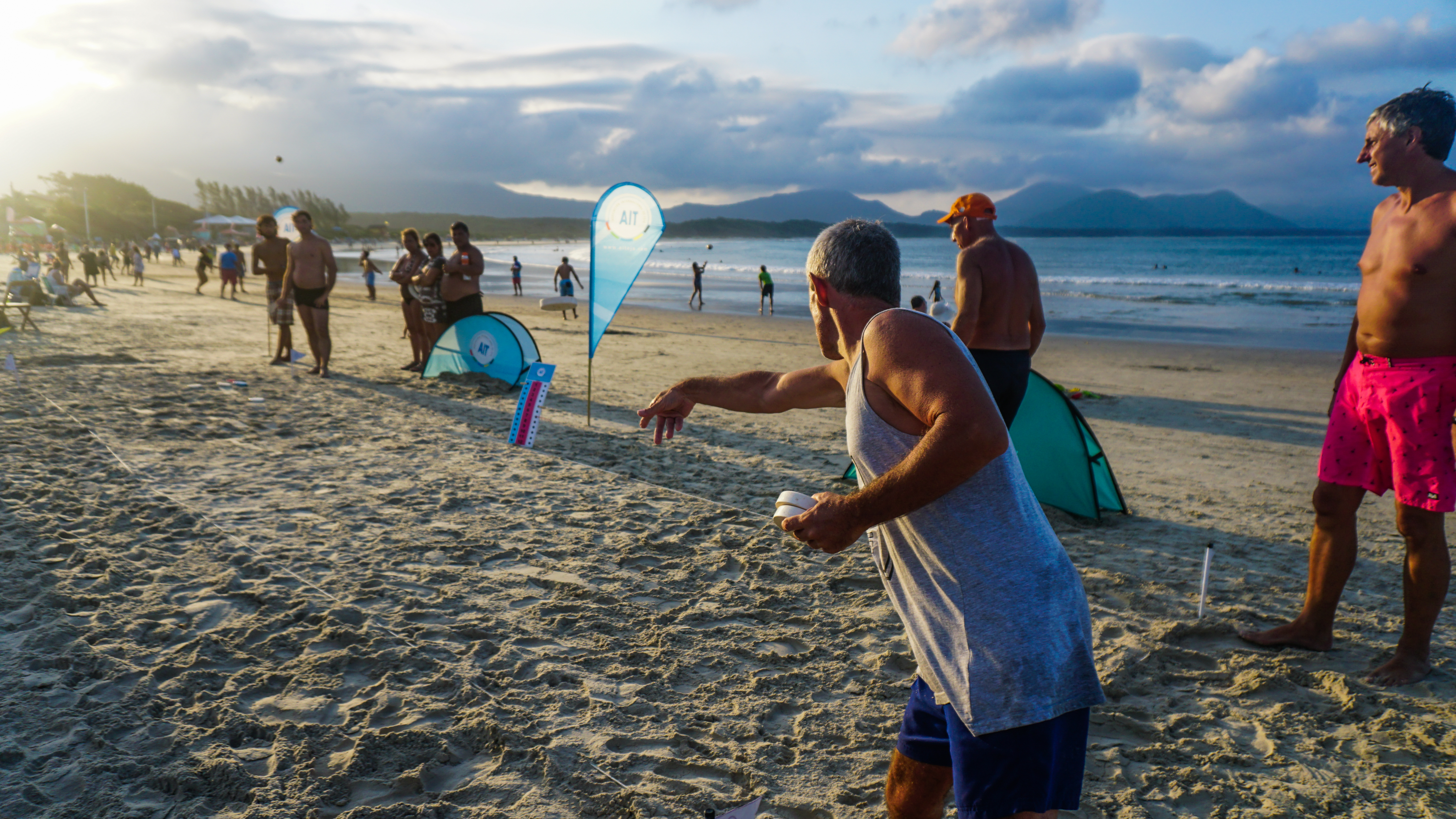
- Highest governing body: International Tejo Association (AIT)

Characteristics
- Team members: Individual, Doubles, Triples, by teams.
- Equipment: Tejo, Tejin.

Tejo (Spanish pronunciation: [ˈte.ho]) is a precision sport in the family of the Bocce, the petanque and jeux de palets (puck games). Tejo can be played by men and women of all ages.

== History ==
The sport was born as a beach game on the coast of Argentina in the mid-nineteenth century. Over the years, it spread across Argentina and neighboring countries. It was elected in 2015 by the Ministry of Sports of the Argentine nation as an indigenous sport for the transplanted Olympics carried out in the city of Mar Del Plata and since 2018 is organized worldwide by the International Association of Tejo (AIT).

== Gameplay ==
Tejo is played between two opposing teams. They play by throwing a series of small discs called tejos (they have two different colours, one for each team) in a rectangular field. They try to score points, winning with 12 (traditionally 15).

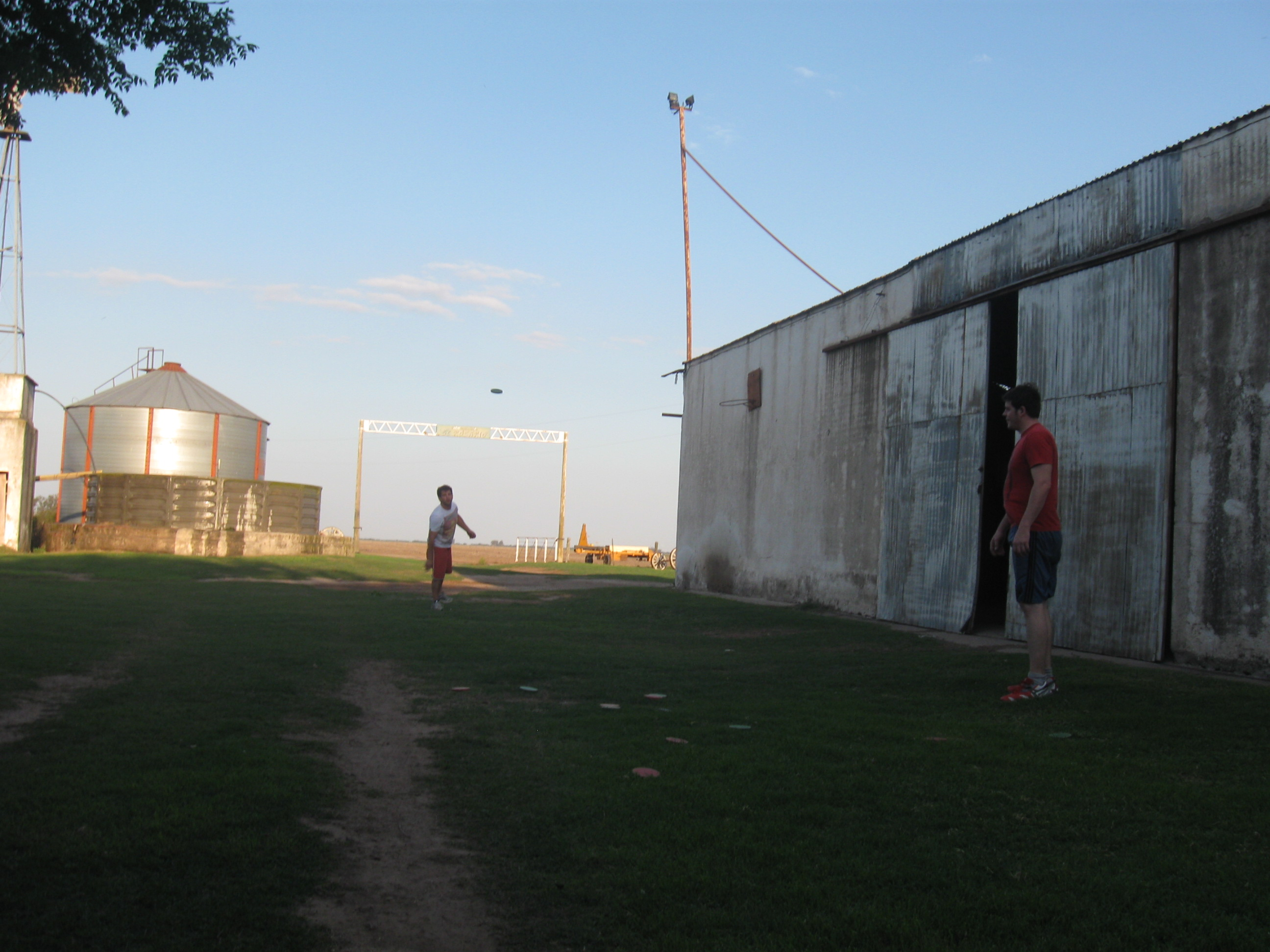
Playing tejo.

One team scores a point for each of its tejos that are nearer a small and neutral tejo, which is called tejin, than the nearest tejo of the opposing team, once all the tejos are played.

The playing field covers 2.5 by 12 meters (8 ft 2 in × 39 ft 4 in) divided in two equal parts.

The traditional surface of the game is sand and can contain land up to 20%.

== See also ==
- Bocce
- Tejo (sport)
