= La Ciotat =

Commune in Provence-Alpes-Côte d'Azur, France

La Ciotat La Ciutat (Occitan)
- Commune
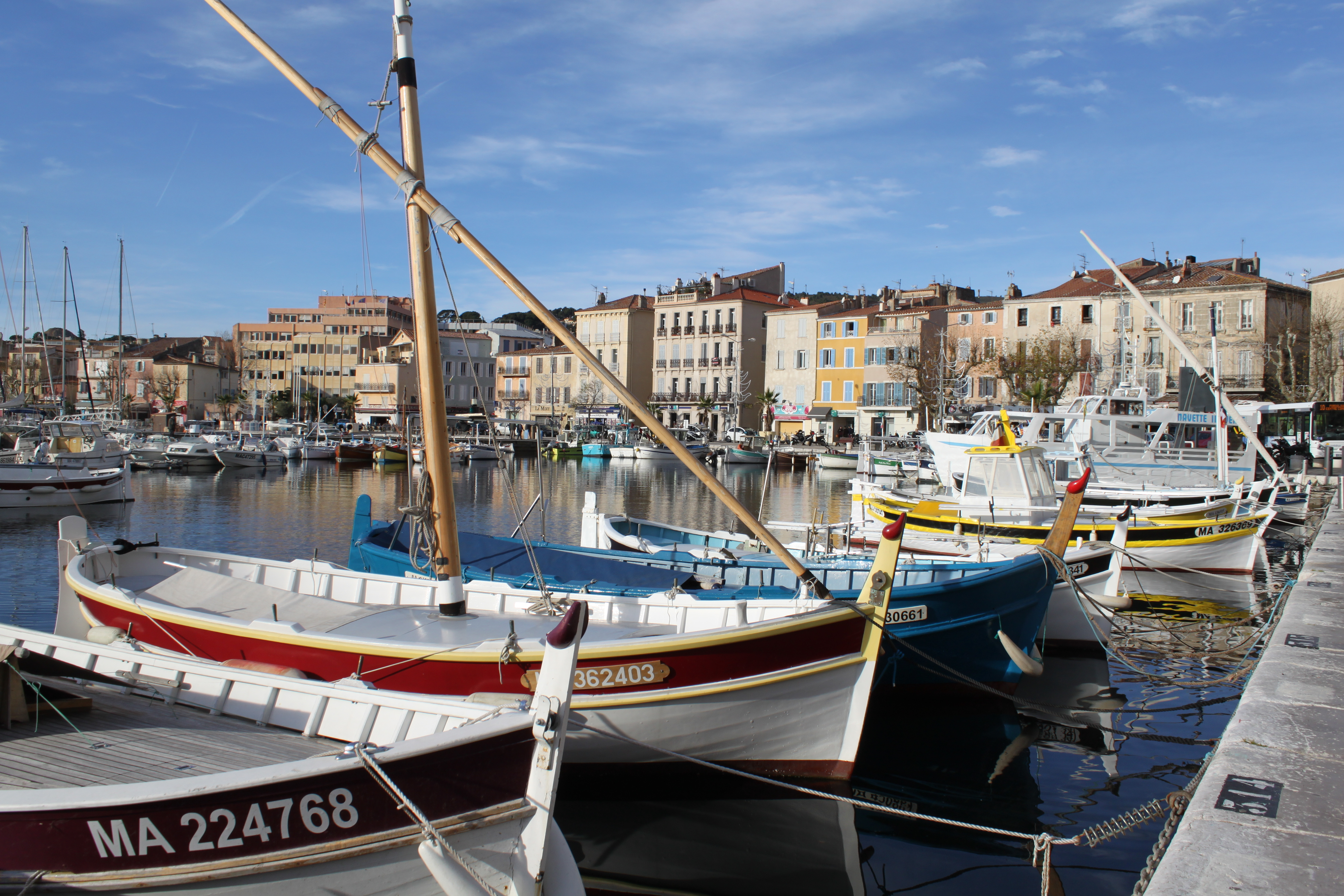
- Marina in La Ciotat

- Coat of arms
- Location of La Ciotat
- Location within France Location within Provence-Alpes-Côte d'Azur
- Coordinates: 43°10′37″N 5°36′31″E
- Country: France
- Region: Provence-Alpes-Côte d'Azur
- Department: Bouches-du-Rhône
- Arrondissement: Marseille
- Canton: La Ciotat
- Intercommunality: Aix-Marseille-Provence

Government
  - Mayor (2026–32): Alexandre Doriol (LR)
- Area^{1}: 31.46 km^{2} (12.15 sq mi)
- Population (2023): 38,477
  - Density: 1,223/km^{2} (3,168/sq mi)
- Demonym(s): Ciotadens (m.); Ciotadennes (f.)
- Time zone: UTC+01:00 (CET)
  - Summer (DST): UTC+02:00 (CEST)
- INSEE/Postal code: 13028 /13600
- ^{1} French Land Register data, which excludes lakes, ponds, glaciers > 1 km^{2} (0.386 sq mi or 247 acres) and river estuaries.

La Ciotat (French pronunciation: [la sjɔta]; Occitan: La Ciutat, (Note: In Mistralian spelling La Ciéutat.) [la sjewˈta], lit. 'The City') is a commune in the French department of Bouches-du-Rhône in the region of Provence-Alpes-Côte d'Azur, southern France. It is the southeasternmost commune of the Aix-Marseille-Provence Metropolis. La Ciotat is located at about 25 km (15.5 mi) to the east of Marseille, at an equal distance from Toulon.

== History ==
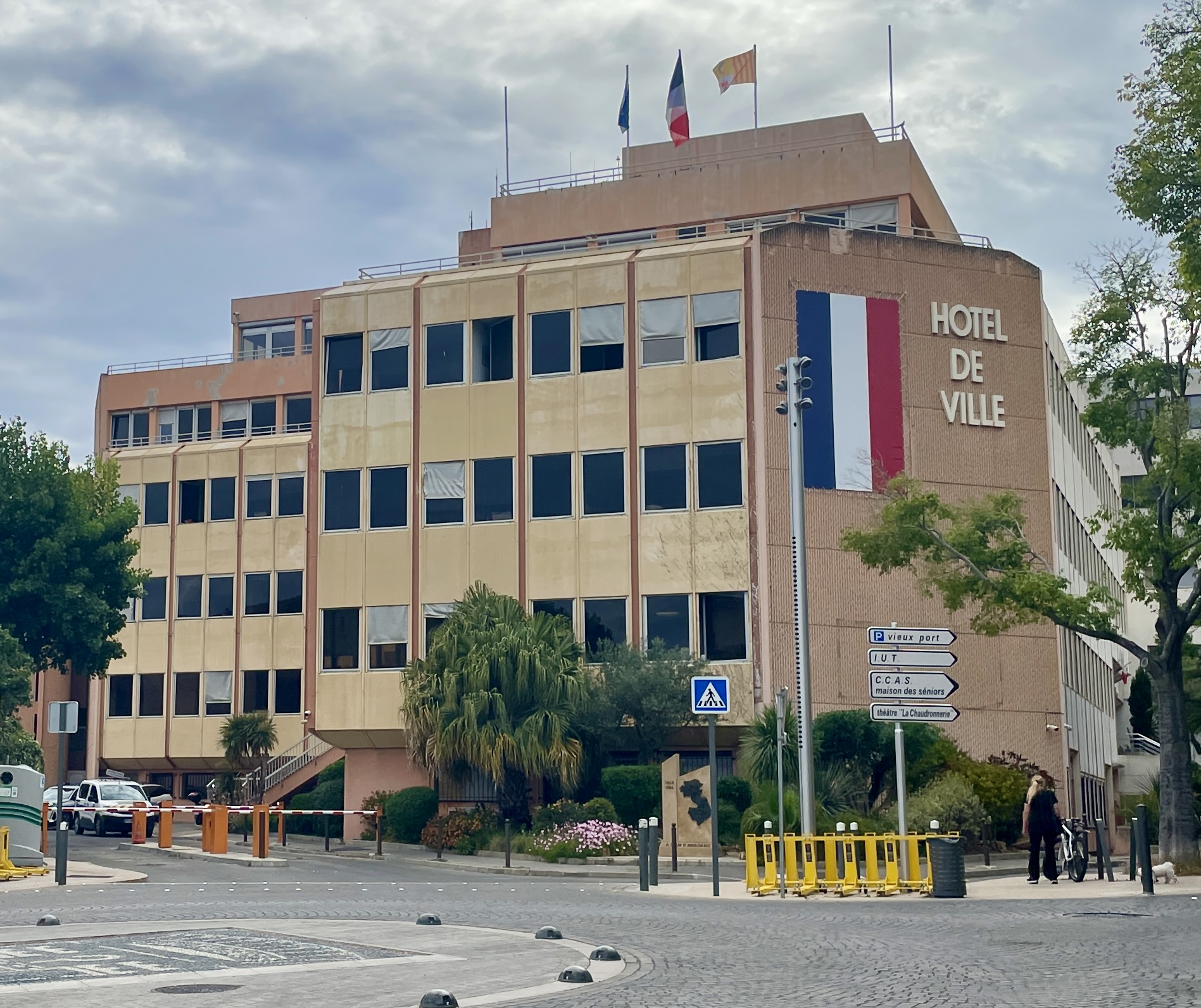
The Hôtel de Ville

The name La Ciutat, meaning 'the City' in Occitan (Provençal) and Catalan, became prominent in the 15th century. In 1429, La Ciotat was granted a charter recognizing it as an independent commune. Over the next century, it became a refuge for Genoese aristocrats escaping the conflicts between France and Spain in their homeland. These immigrants likely played a key role in establishing a shipyard, which specialized in constructing vessels to export local products such as olive oil, wine, wheat, and soap. In return, these ships brought back luxury goods—including spices, silks, carpets, perfumes, and porcelain—to satisfy the growing demands of the town's increasingly prosperous residents.

Later, La Ciotat was the setting of one of the first projected motion pictures, L'Arrivée d'un train en gare de La Ciotat filmed by the Lumière brothers in 1895. According to the Institut Lumière, before its Paris premiere, the film was shown to invited audiences in several French cities, including La Ciotat.

Another three of the earliest Lumière films, Partie de cartes, L'Arroseur arrosé (the first known filmed comedy), and Repas de bébé, were also filmed in La Ciotat in 1895, at the Villa du Clos des Plages, the summer residence of the Lumière Brothers. In 1904 the Lumiere Brothers also developed their first colour photographs in La Ciotat.

In 1907 Jules Le Noir invented the game of pétanque in La Ciotat, and the first tournament was held there in 1910. The history of the game is documented in the Musée Ciotaden.

The Hôtel de Ville was built as the head office of a local shipbuilding company in 1978.

== Demographics ==
Historical population

Year	Pop.	±% p.a.
1793	6,160	—
1800	6,117	−0.10%
1806	5,274	−2.44%
1821	5,237	−0.05%
1831	5,427	+0.36%
1836	5,382	−0.17%
1841	5,902	+1.86%
1846	5,429	−1.66%
1851	5,196	−0.87%
1856	7,674	+8.11%
1861	8,444	+1.93%
1866	10,017	+3.48%
1872	9,867	−0.25%
1876	10,058	+0.48%
1881	9,702	−0.72%
1886	10,689	+1.96%
1891	12,223	+2.72%
1896	12,734	+0.82%
1901	11,622	−1.81%

Year	Pop.	±% p.a.
1906	12,370	+1.26%
1911	9,975	−4.21%
1921	10,690	+0.69%
1926	11,877	+2.13%
1931	12,425	+0.91%
1936	13,428	+1.56%
1946	13,410	−0.01%
1954	15,159	+1.54%
1962	18,827	+2.75%
1968	23,916	+4.07%
1975	32,721	+4.58%
1982	31,727	−0.44%
1990	30,620	−0.44%
1999	31,630	+0.36%
2007	32,901	+0.49%
2012	34,063	+0.70%
2017	35,174	+0.64%
2023	38,477	+1.51%

Source: EHESS and INSEE (1968-2023)

== Commerce ==
La Ciotat has a large number of offices uptown. These offices are a major source of employment and income for the local people through the transport, catering and other services they require. Also, business travelers to La Ciotat drive the local hotel business, which otherwise depends mainly on the tourism season.

The centre has shopping malls along with branches of Carrefour and McDonald's. Route 10 passes through the city centre on its way downtown from La Ciotat station.

== Transport ==
The primary mode of transport into La Ciotat is the railway station. The SNCF train service between Marseille and Toulon stops at La Ciotat.

Most parts of La Ciotat are covered by its public transport bus service. The railway station is serviced by route no. 10, 21 and 40 which all go to the La Ciotat downtown station by different routes.

== Route des Crêtes ==
Cap Canaille 394 metres (1,293 feet), between La Ciotat and Cassis, is one of the highest maritime bluffs in Europe. The route des crêtes is a coastal road between the two towns that passes over this cliff.

== Beach ==
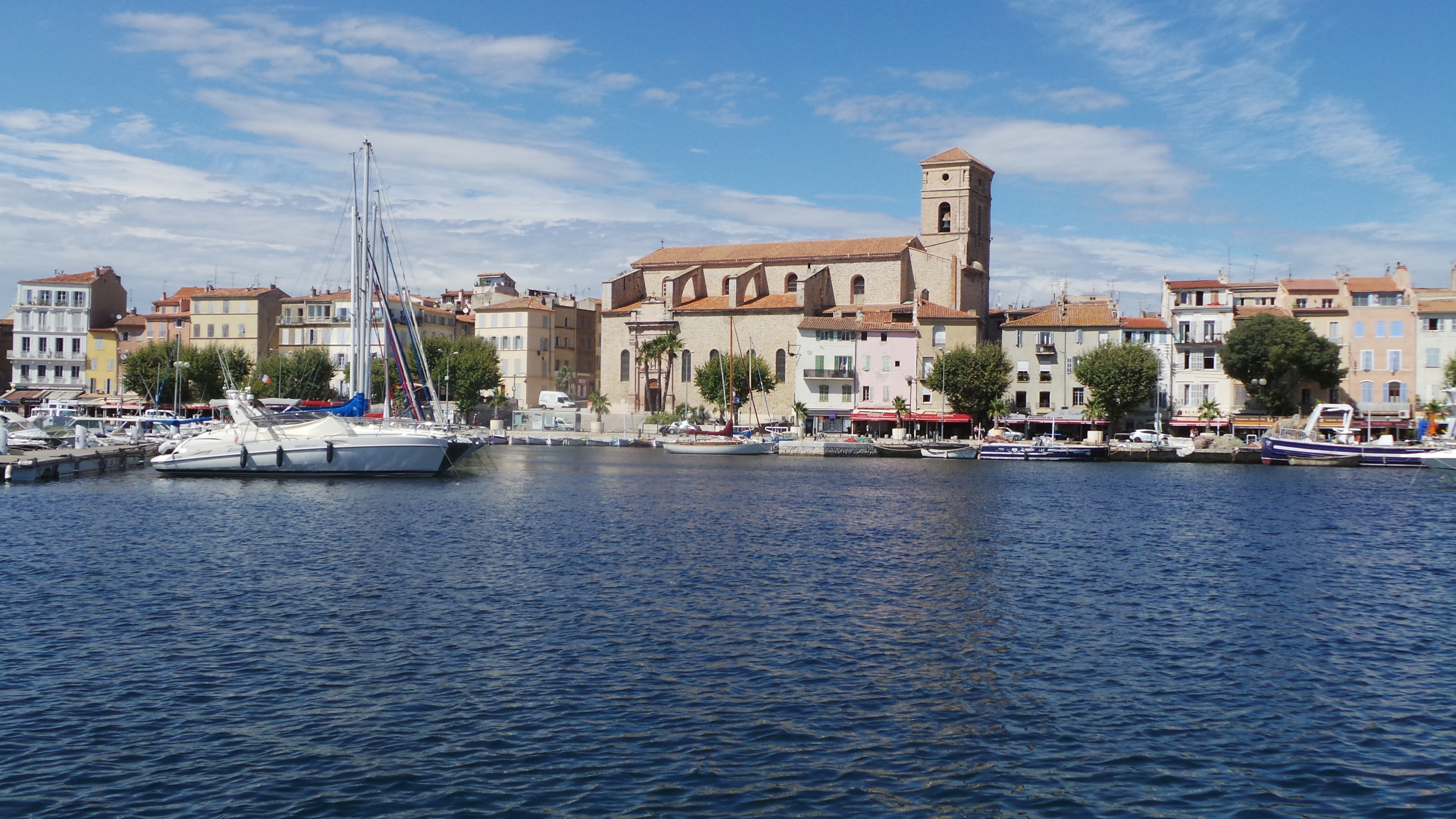
Waterfront landscape, Vieux Port, La Ciotat

La Ciotat has an artificial sand beach because of its rocky location. The beach is located downtown and is at walking distance from local market, the ship yards and the main bus station. The beach faces the Alps mountain regions on one side and the uphill commercial area on the other side. Most hotels, restaurants and bars in La Ciotat are located on the same street.

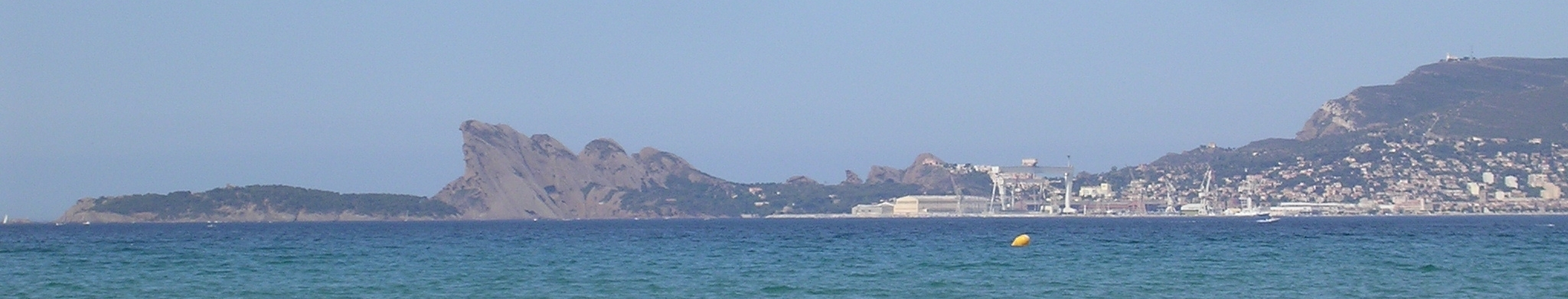
La Ciotat

== Sport ==
La Ciotat has a football club, ES La Ciotat, which plays at the Stade Jean Bouissou.

The game of pétanque was invented in La Ciotat in 1907.

== Miscellaneous ==
The municipal park of La Ciotat, the Parc du Mugel, located on the Anse deu Petit Mugel, is classified as one of the Remarkable Gardens of France by the Ministry of Culture. Sheltered by the massive rock called "Le Bec D'Aigle" (the eagle's beak), 155 meters high, it contains both a botanical garden of tropical plants and a nature preserve of native Provençal plants, covering the hillside below the rock.

The town has an annual film festival in early June called the 'Cinestival', and usually revolves around a specific topic. It also has two other annual film related festivals, with a scriptwriter festival in April and an associated film conference 'Berceau du cinema' around two weeks after Cinestival.

== Twin towns and sister cities ==
La Ciotat is twinned with:

- Bridgwater, England, United Kingdom, since 1957
- Kranj, Slovenia, since 1958
- Singen, Germany, since 1958
- Torre Annunziata, Italy, since 2006

== See also ==
- Battle of La Ciotat
- Calanque
- Corniche des Crêtes
- Communes of the Bouches-du-Rhône department
- List of works by Louis Botinelly
