= Swedish pétanque championships =

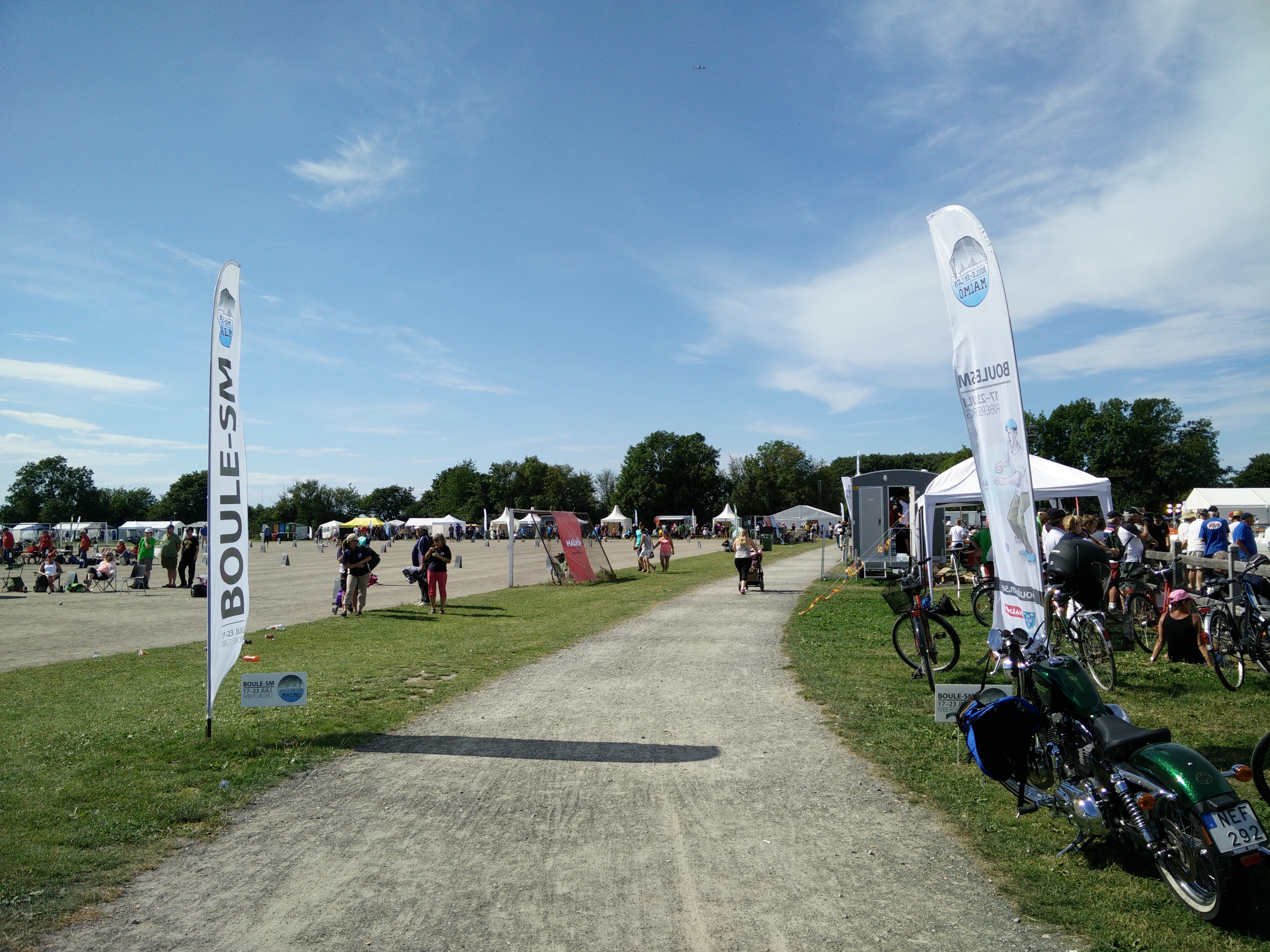
The Swedish pétanque championships in 2016.

The Swedish pétanque championships is the largest Swedish pétanque competition. It's been arranged since 1978. The first year the championships were held in Bara and had 150 competitors. In the early 2000s it had around 2500 competitors.

== Cities ==
The championships have been held in the following places:

År	Plats
1978	Bara
1979	Gävle
1980	Malmö
1981	Gävle
1982	Skara
1983	Halmstad
1984	Gothenburg
1985	Halmstad
1986	Stockholm
1987	Malmö
1988	Gothenburg
1989	Motala
1990	Halmstad
1991	Kullabygden
1992	Växjö
1993	Motala
1994	Boden
1995	Halmstad
1996	Borås
1997	Stockholm
1998	Gothenburg
1999	Motala
2000	Boden
2001	Skövde
2002	Gothenburg
2003	Gothenburg
2004	Gothenburg
2005	Gothenburg
2006	Eskilstuna
2007	Eskilstuna
2008	Borås
2009	Växjö
2010	Falun
2011	Uppsala
2012	Skövde
2013	Falun
2014	Växjö
2015	Uppsala
2016	Malmö
2017	Vetlanda
2018	Karlstad
2019	Linköping
2020	Canceled
2021	Lindvallen (planned)
2022	Jönköping (planned)
