= La Ciotat station =

Railway station in La Ciotat, France

Coordinates: 43°11′59″N 5°37′58″E

Gare de La Ciotat is a railway station serving the town La Ciotat, Bouches-du-Rhône department, southeastern France. It is situated on the Marseille–Ventimiglia railway, and is served by trains between Marseille, Toulon and Hyères. It is known for the 1895 film L'Arrivée d'un train en gare de La Ciotat, directed and produced by Auguste and Louis Lumière.

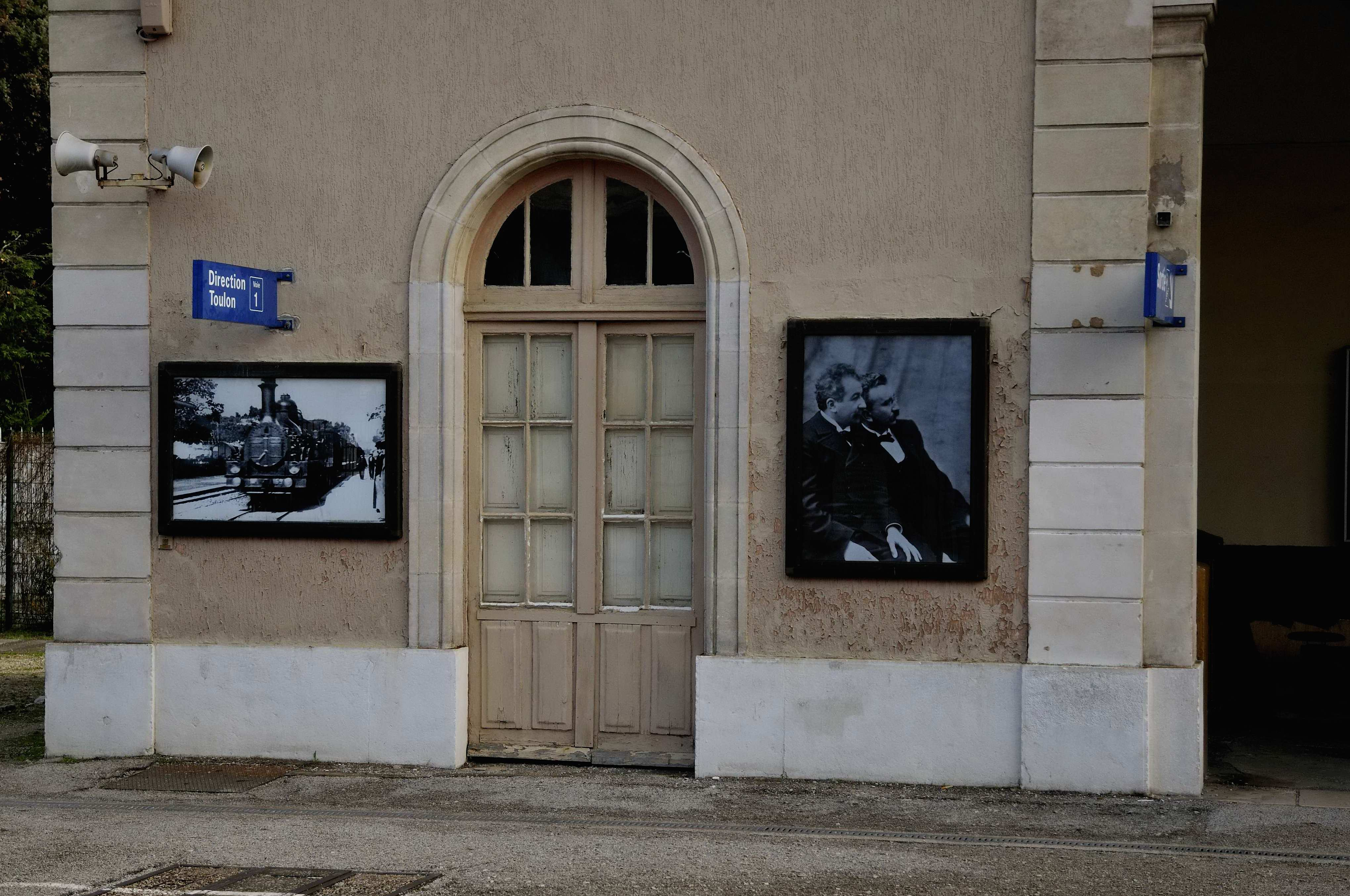
La Ciotat train station (shown here in 2010) commemorates the film.

Preceding station	TER PACA	Following station
Cassis towards Marseille	1	Saint-Cyr-Les Lecques-La Cadière towards Hyères
