= Boulodrome =

Recreational facilities

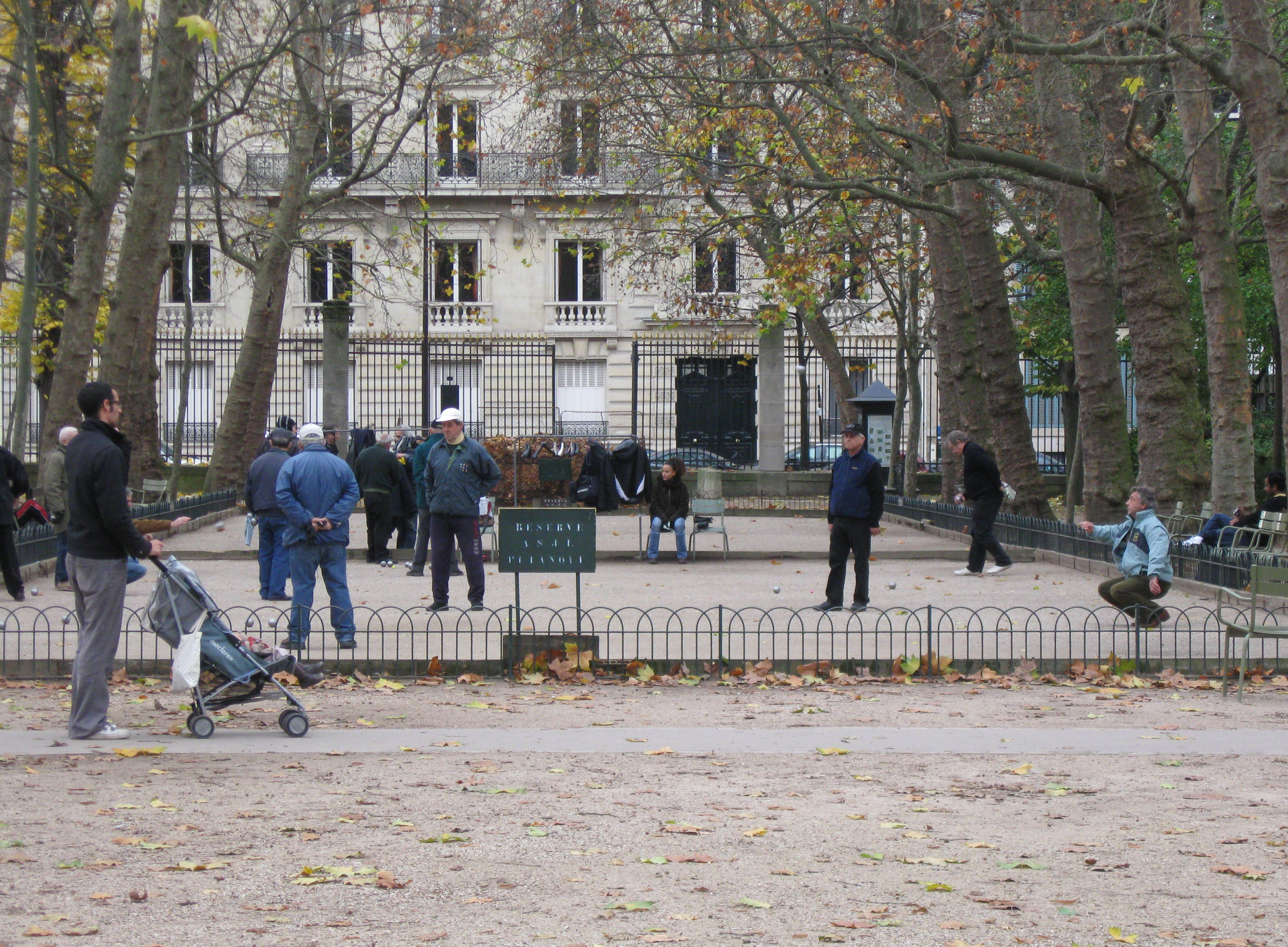
Boulodrome court in the Luxembourg Garden, Paris

A boulodrome is a venue designed for training and competitions involving ball and skittle games (such as pétanque, boule lyonnaise, boule bretonne, jeu provençal, and others). For pétanque, the dimensions of a boulodrome must be multiples of 15.00 m in length and 4.00 m in width (for example: 60.00 m × 20.00 m). In addition, there must be 1.00 m between courts, both lengthwise and widthwise, resulting in a total of 65.00 m in length (3.00 m between the four courts and 2.00 m at the edges) and 26.00 m in width.
