= The Countryman and the Cinematograph =

1901 British film by Robert W. Paul

- Screenshot from the film
- Directed by: Robert W. Paul
- Produced by: Robert W. Paul
- Production company: Paul's Animatograph Works
- Release date: 1901
- Running time: 15 seconds
- Country: United Kingdom
- Language: Silent

The Countryman and the Cinematograph (also known as The Countryman's First Sight of the Animated Pictures) is a 1901 British short silent comedy film, directed by Robert W. Paul, featuring a stereotypical yokel reacting to films projected onto a screen. The film "is one of the earliest known examples of a film within a film", where, according to Michael Brooke of BFI Screenonline, "the audience reaction to that film is as important a part of the drama as the content of the film itself".

In 1902, a remake of the film, Uncle Josh at the Moving Picture Show, was produced at the Edison Company, directed by Edwin S. Porter.
