= Bowling, Billiard and Boules Federation of the Islamic Republic of Iran =

Sports governing body in Iran

The Bowling, Billiard and Boules Federation of the Islamic Republic of Iran (BBBFIR) is the governing body in Iran of ten-pin bowling and most cue sports (including snooker and various forms of pool), up to the international level, and has some involvement in the organisation of competition in boules and related games. Founded in 2000, BBBFIR was originally known as the Iran Bowling and Billiards Federation (IBBF), later also as Iran Bowling and Cue Sports Federation (IranBCS), and Bowling, Billiard and Boules Federation of the Islamic Republic of Iran (BBFIR). BBBFIR is headquartered in Tehran.

== Affiliations ==
BBBFIR is the national governing body for these sports under the National Olympic Committee of I.R. Iran, a member of the Olympic Council of Asia, a regional constituent of the International Olympic Committee. None of these games are currently Olympic sports, as of 2023.

For bowling, BBBFIR is the national affiliate of the Asian Bowling Federation (regional division of the International Bowling Federation, with its discipline-specific division, World Tenpin Bowling Association; its counterpart World Ninepin Bowling Association does not include BBBFIR as a federation member, probably because the sport is mostly confined to Europe).

In cue sports, BBBFIR is the national affiliate of the Asian Confederation of Billiard Sports (regional division of the World Pool-Billiard Association), International Billiards and Snooker Federation, and Asian Pocket Billiard Union BBBFIR, as member of WPA and IBSF, is also a national affiliate of the World Confederation of Billiards Sports. Carom billiards in Iran is not governed by BBBFIR but by the African and Middle East Carom Confederation of the Union Mondiale de Billard (part of WCBS).

Boules (and variants pétanque, jeu provençal, and bocce) appear not to be governed in Iran by BBBFIR in national or international competition; rather, BBBIFR as part of the Iran National Olympic Committee would be involved in efforts with other IOC members to make boules an Olympic sport. Within the ongoing competition structure of the overarching Confédération Mondiale des Sports de Boules, most of these games in Iran are governed by the Boules and Petanque Association of I.R. Iran a.k.a. Boules Sport Association of I.R. Iran, based in Hamedan; it is a national affiliate of the Fédération Internationale de Boules and of the Asian Boules Sport Confederation (part of Fédération Internationale de Pétanque et Jeu Provençal). Bocce in the country is governed by the Iran Bocce Committee of the Confederazione Boccistica Internazionale. As of 2023, what role if any BBBFRI plays in organising actual boules (and related) competition is unclear.
