= Pitch (sports field) =

Surface on which a sports game takes place

A pitch or a sports ground is an outdoor playing area for various sports. The term pitch is most commonly used in British English, while the comparable term in Australian, American and Canadian English is playing field or sports field.

For most sports the official term is field of play, although this is not regularly used by those outside refereeing/umpiring circles. The field of play generally includes out-of-bounds areas that a player is likely to enter while playing a match, such as the area beyond the touchlines in association football and rugby or the sidelines in American and Canadian football, or the "foul territory" in baseball.

The surface of a pitch is most commonly composed of sod (grass), but may also be artificial turf, sand, clay, gravel, concrete, or other materials. A playing field on ice may be referred to as a rink, for example an ice hockey rink, although rink may also refer to the entire building or, in the sport of curling, to either the building or a particular team.

In the sport of cricket, the cricket pitch refers not to the entire field of play, but to the section of the field on which batting and bowling take place in the centre of the field. The pitch is prepared differently from the rest of the field, to provide a harder surface for bowling.

A pitch is often a regulation space, as in an association football pitch.

The term level playing field is also used metaphorically to mean fairness in non-sporting human activities such as business where there are notional winners and losers.

== Fields of play in various sports ==
Pitches
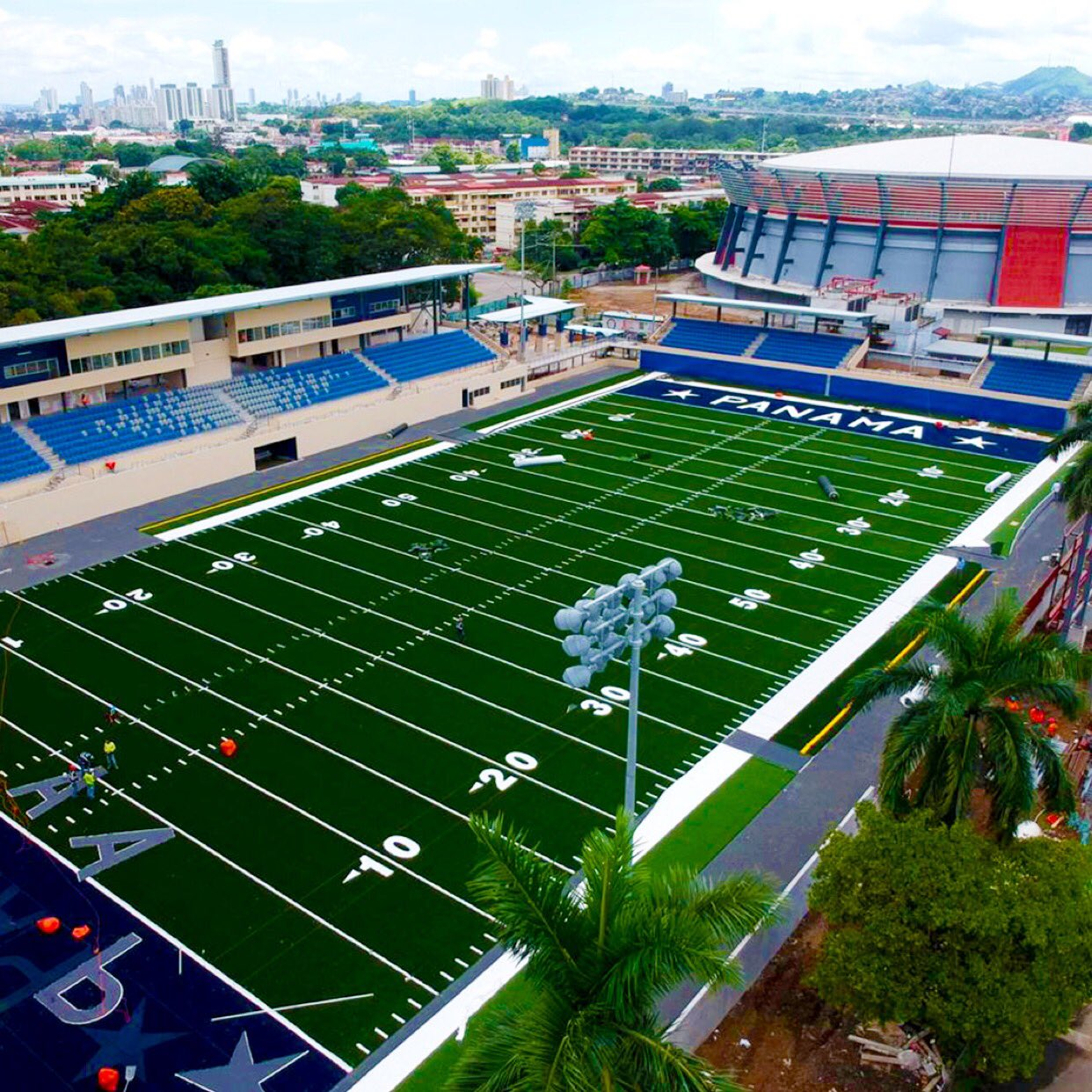
American football field

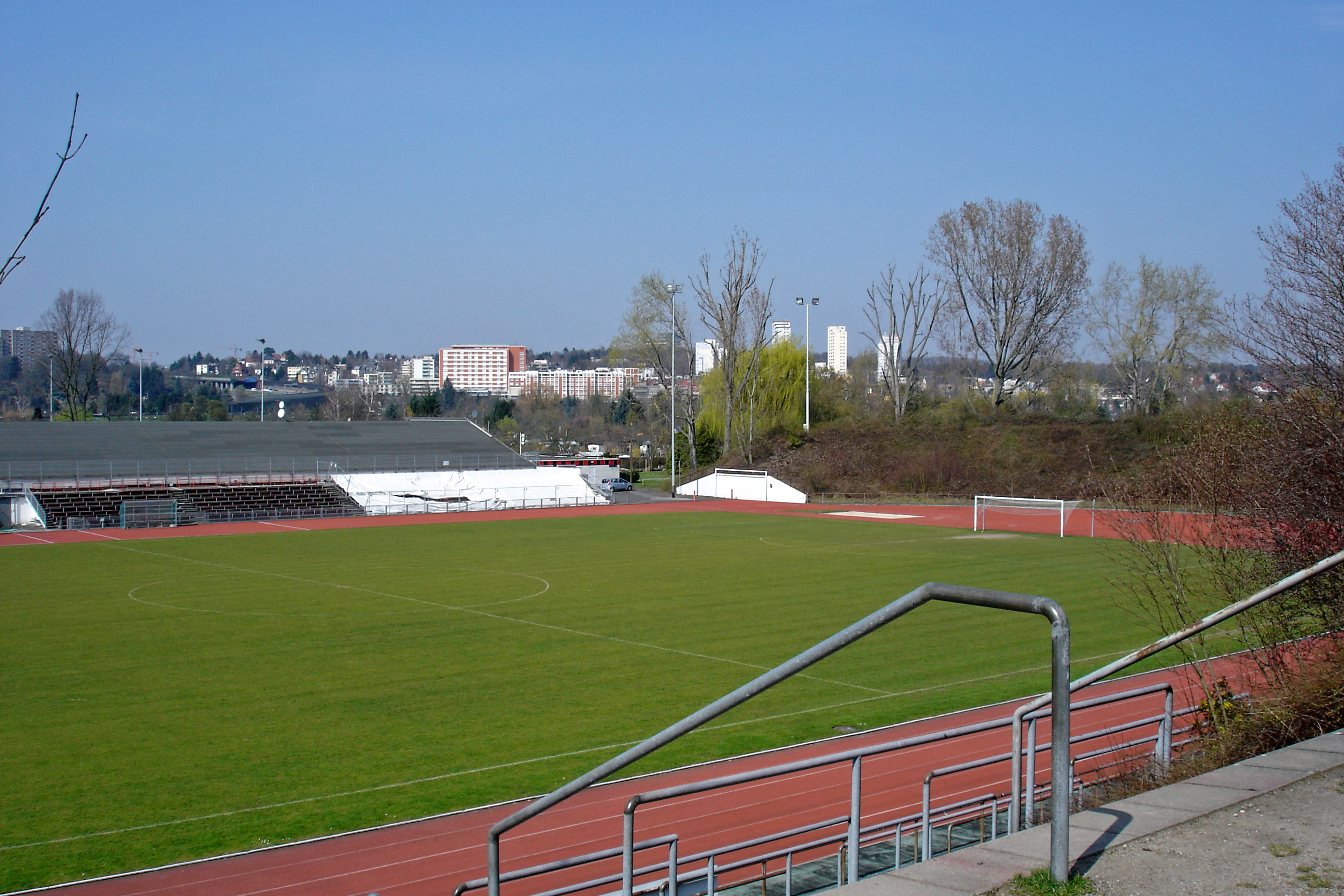
Association football pitch,
surrounded by running track

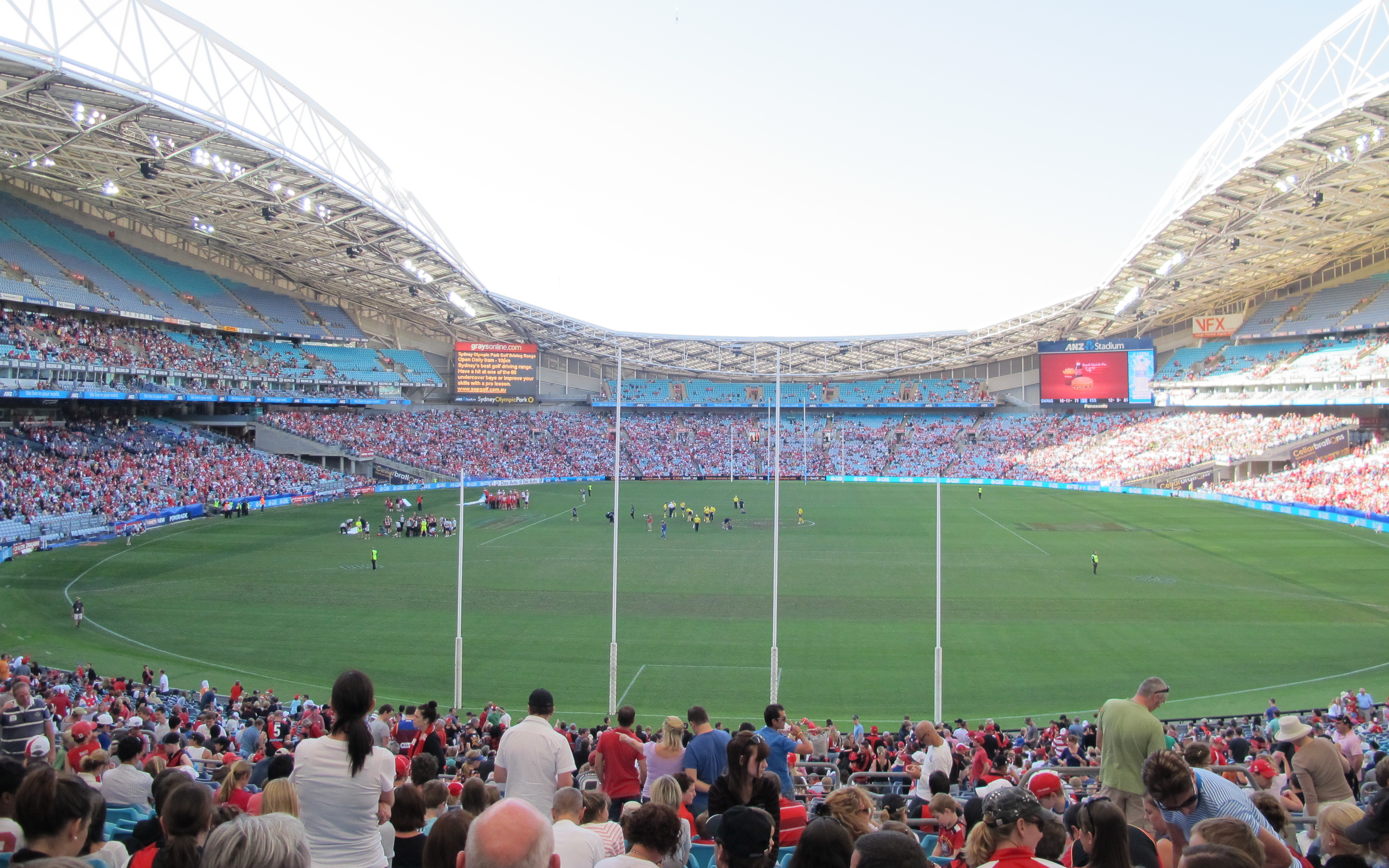
Australian rules football playing field

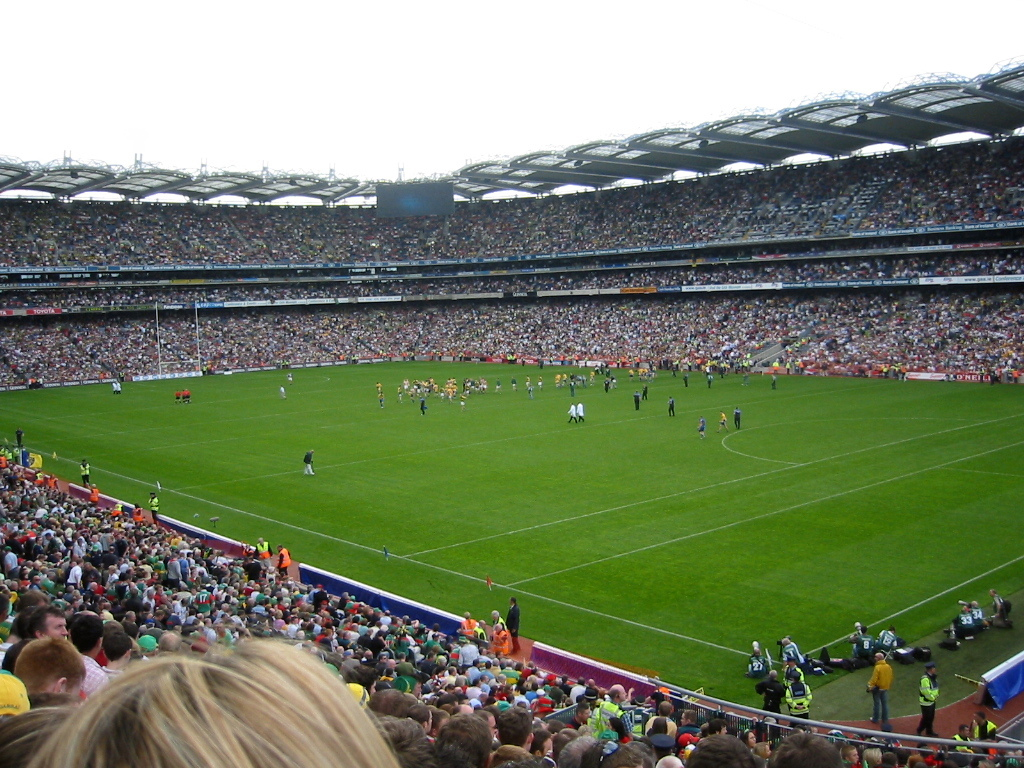
Gaelic and Ladies' Gaelic football, hurling, and camogie pitch

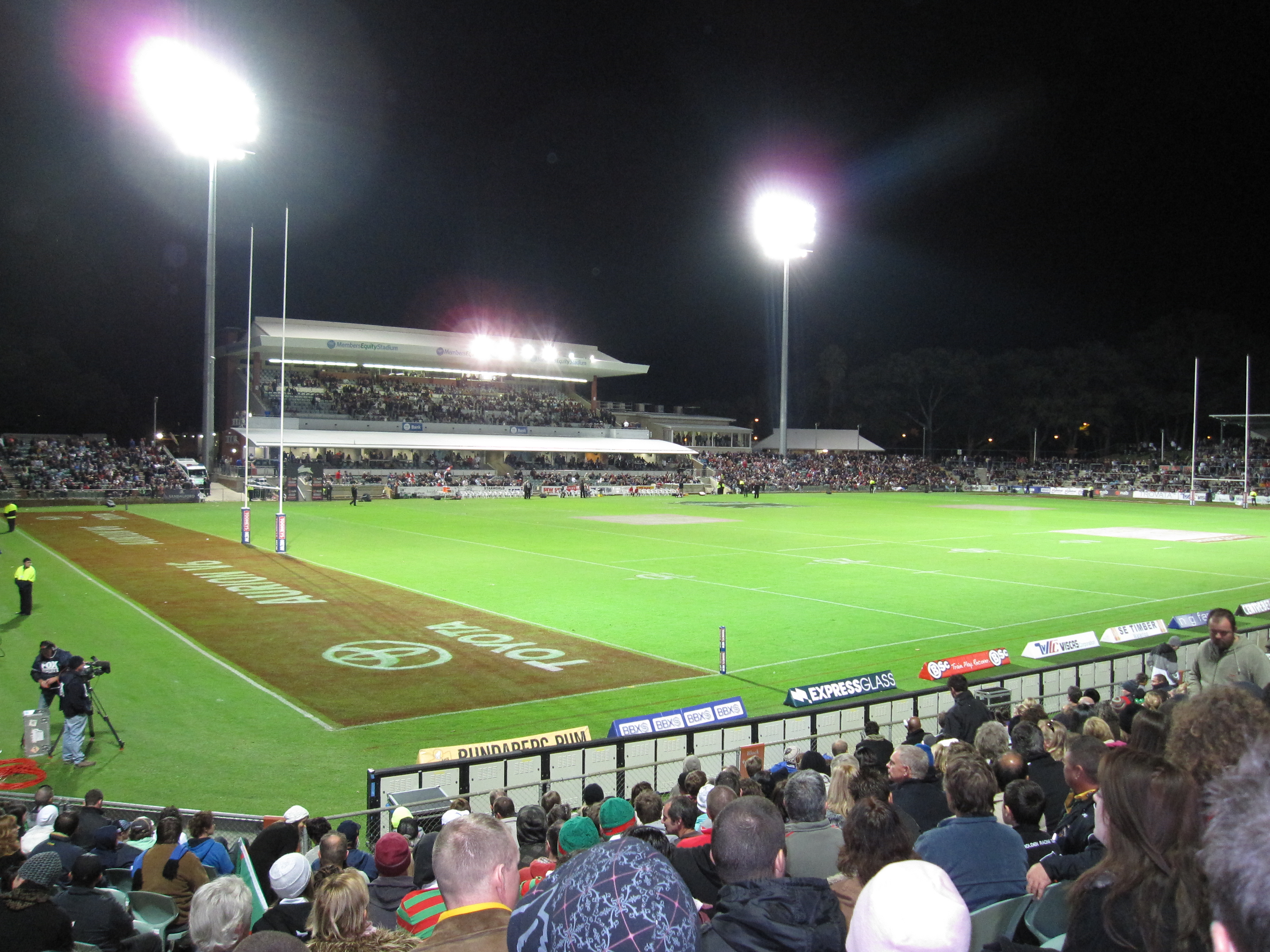
Rugby league playing field

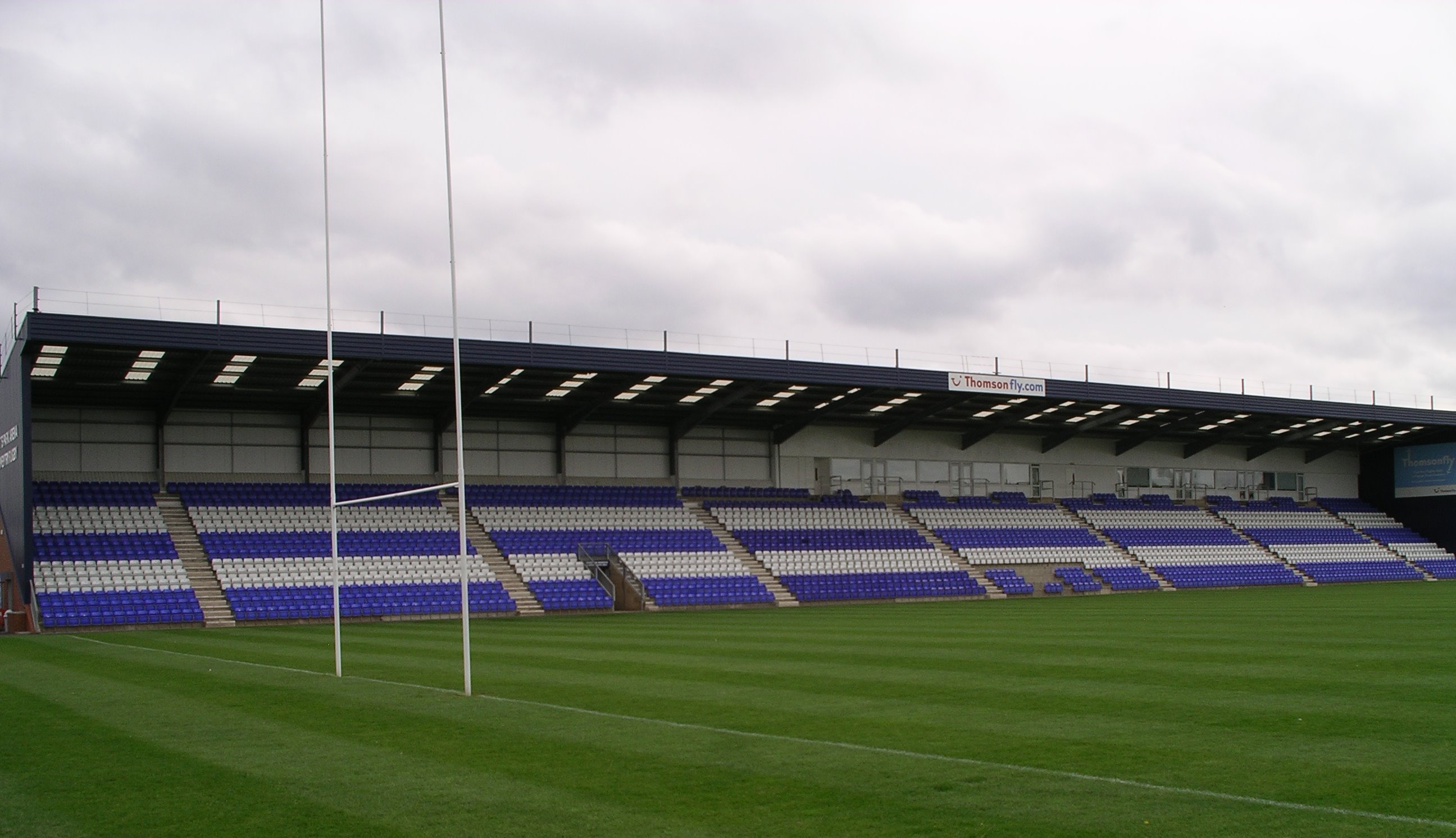
Rugby union pitch

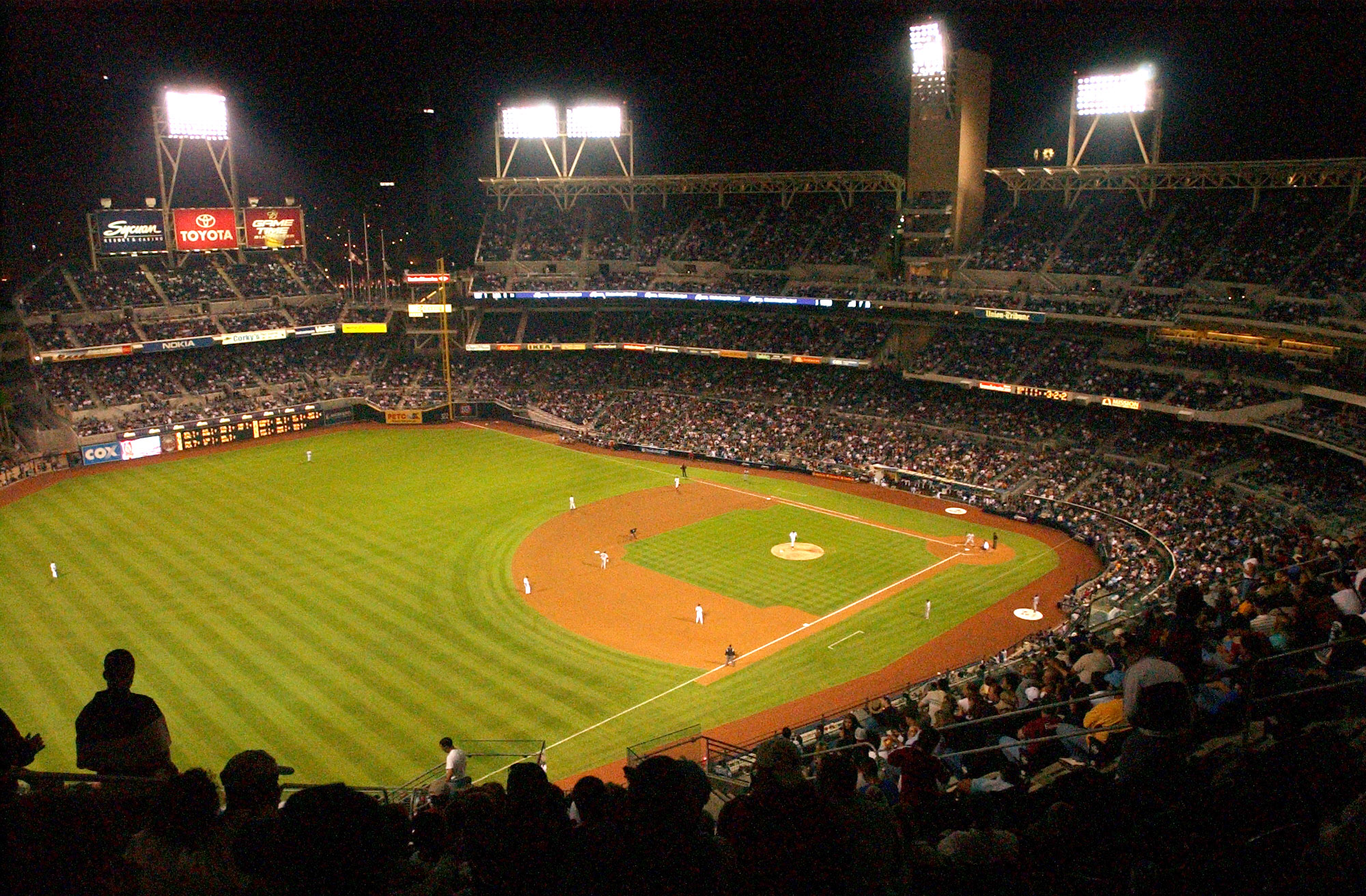
Baseball field

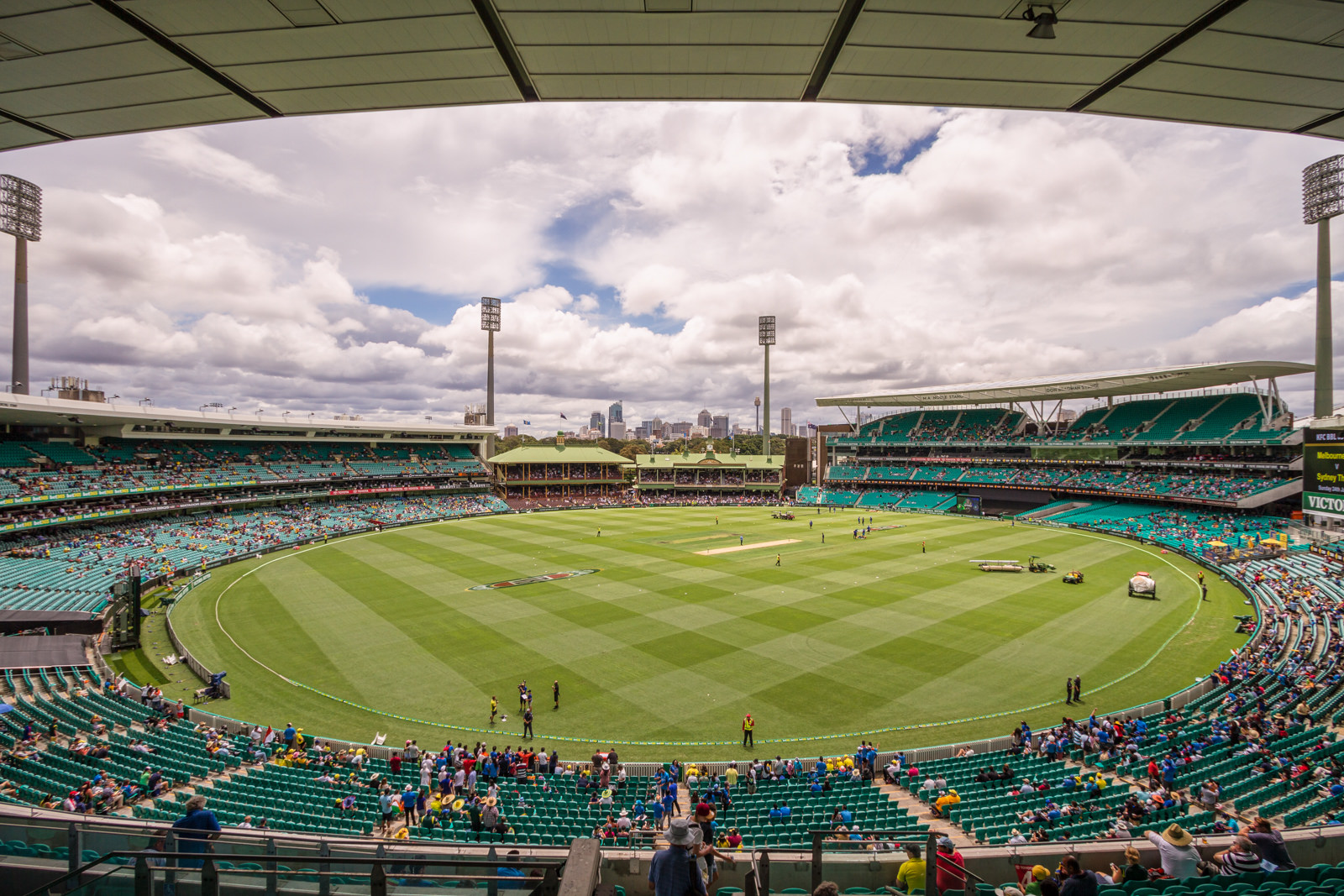
Cricket field (with the cricket pitch in the centre)

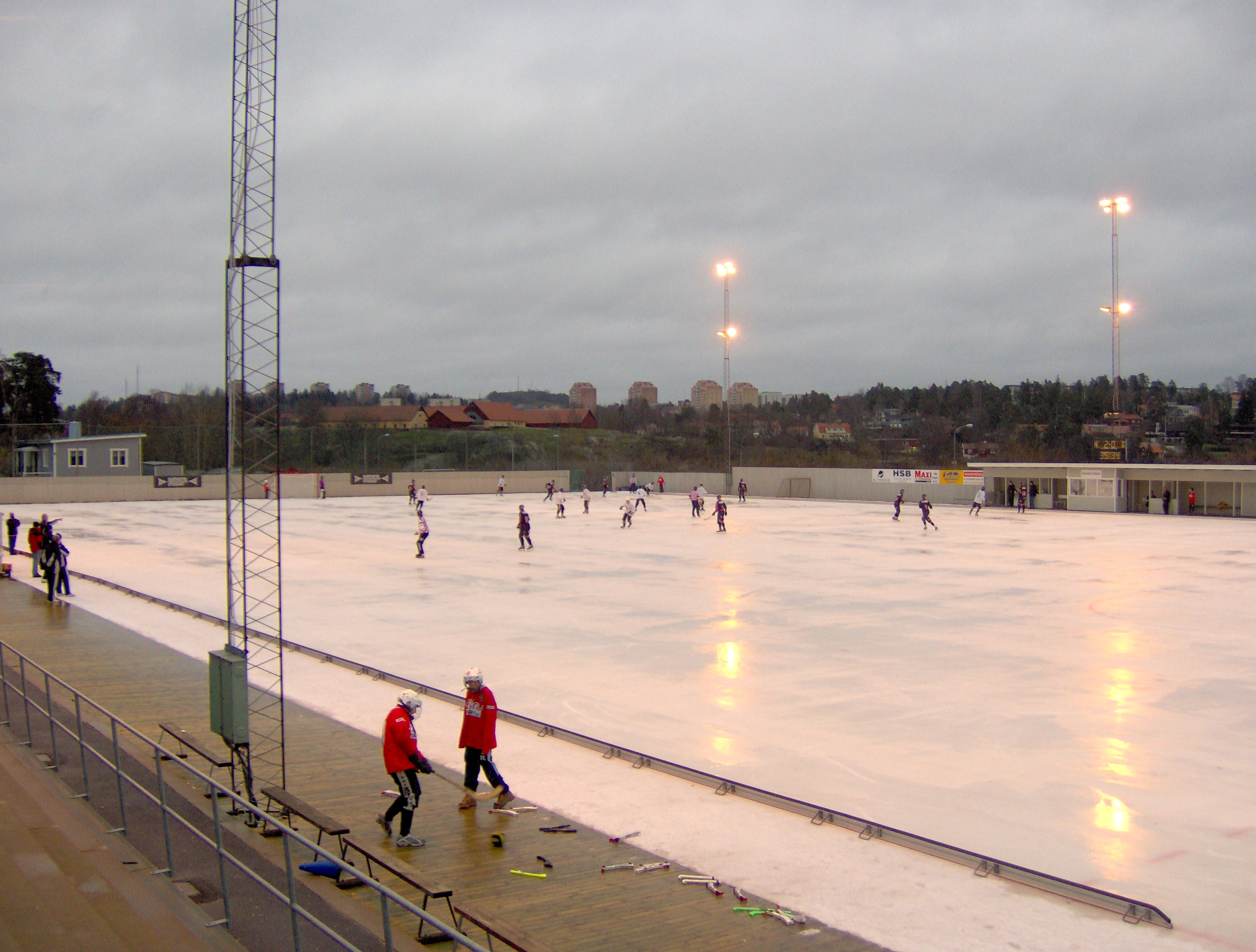
Bandy field

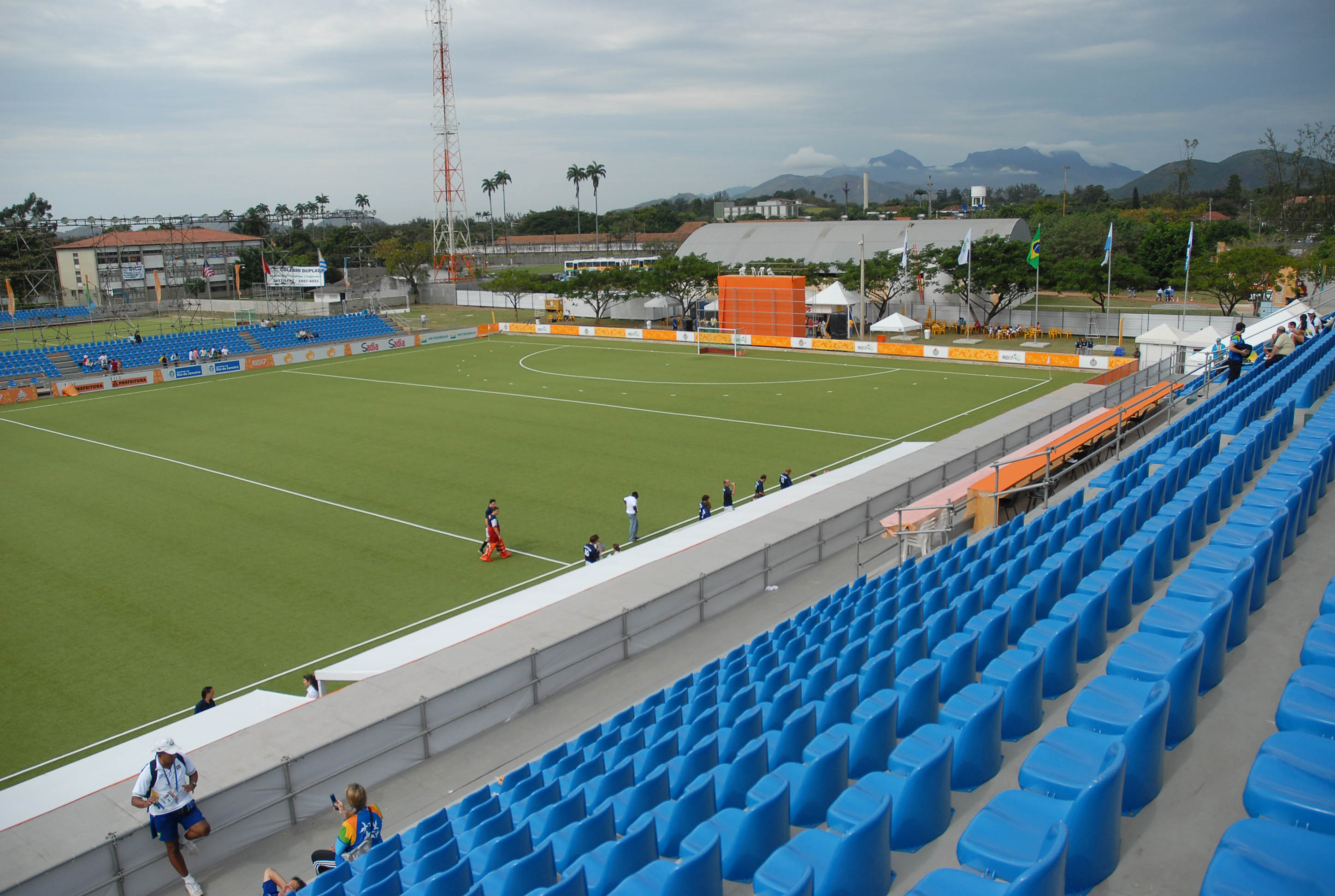
Field hockey pitch

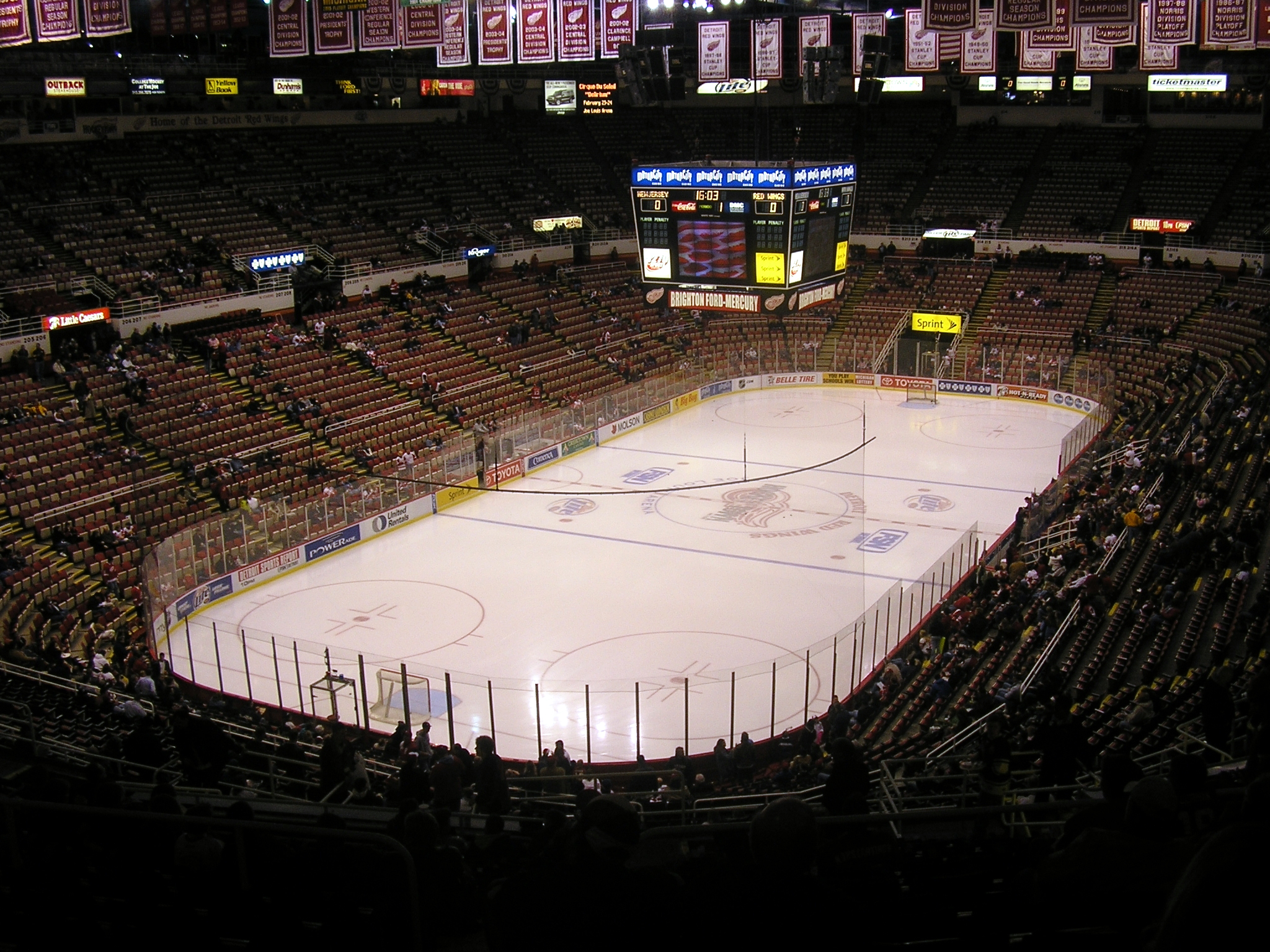
Ice hockey rink

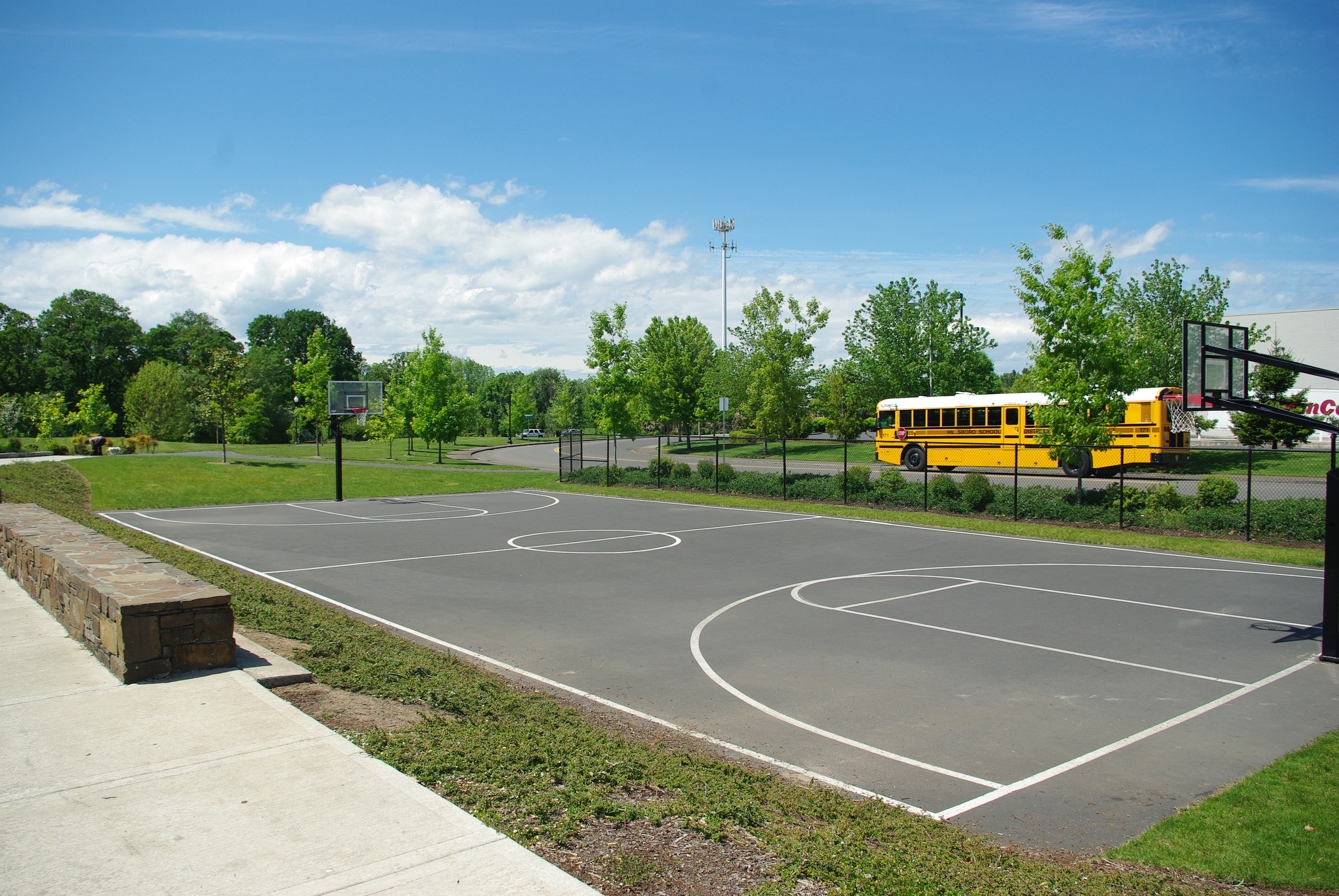
Basketball court

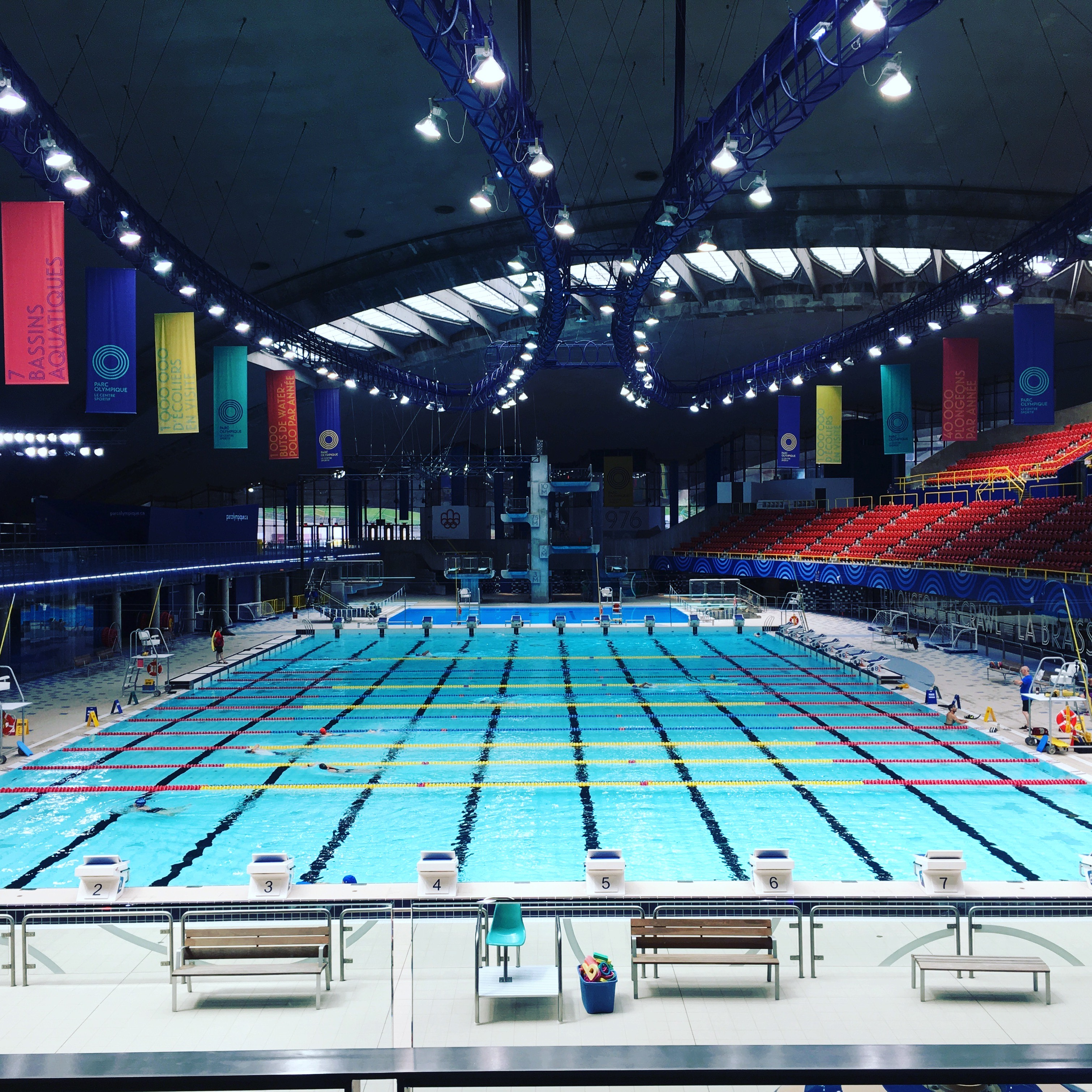
Olympic swimming pool

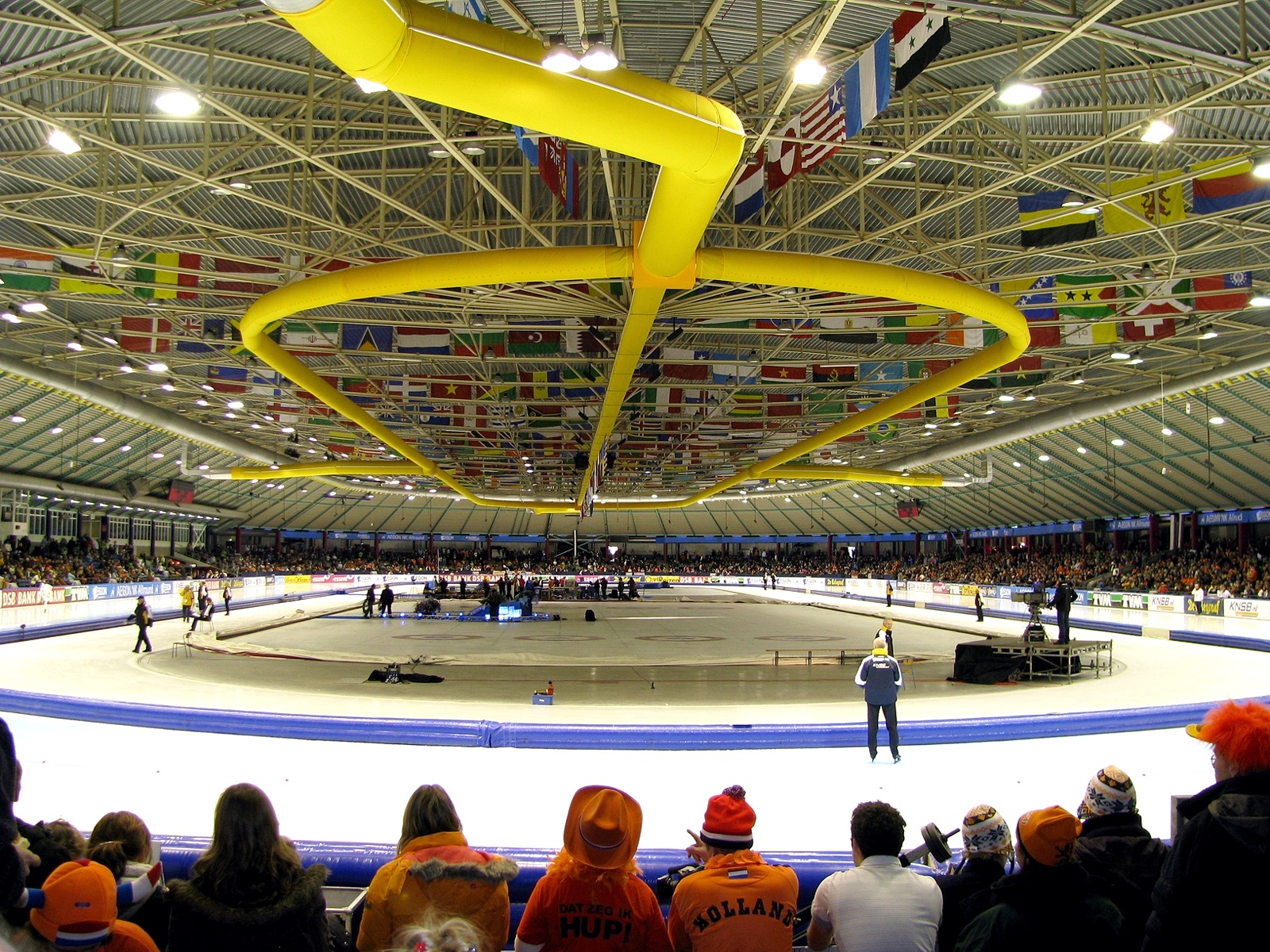
Speed skating rink

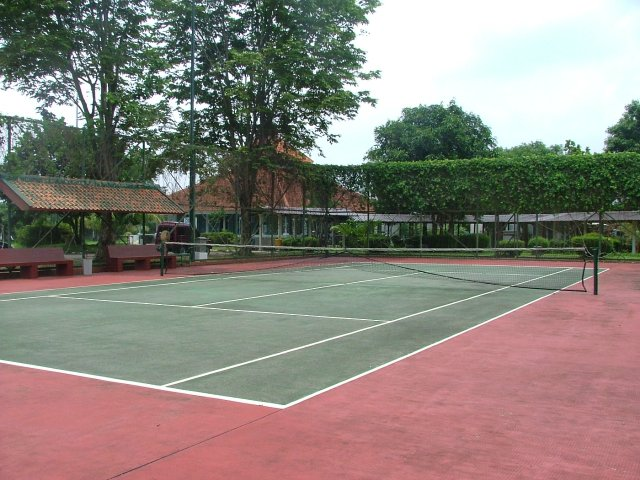
Tennis court

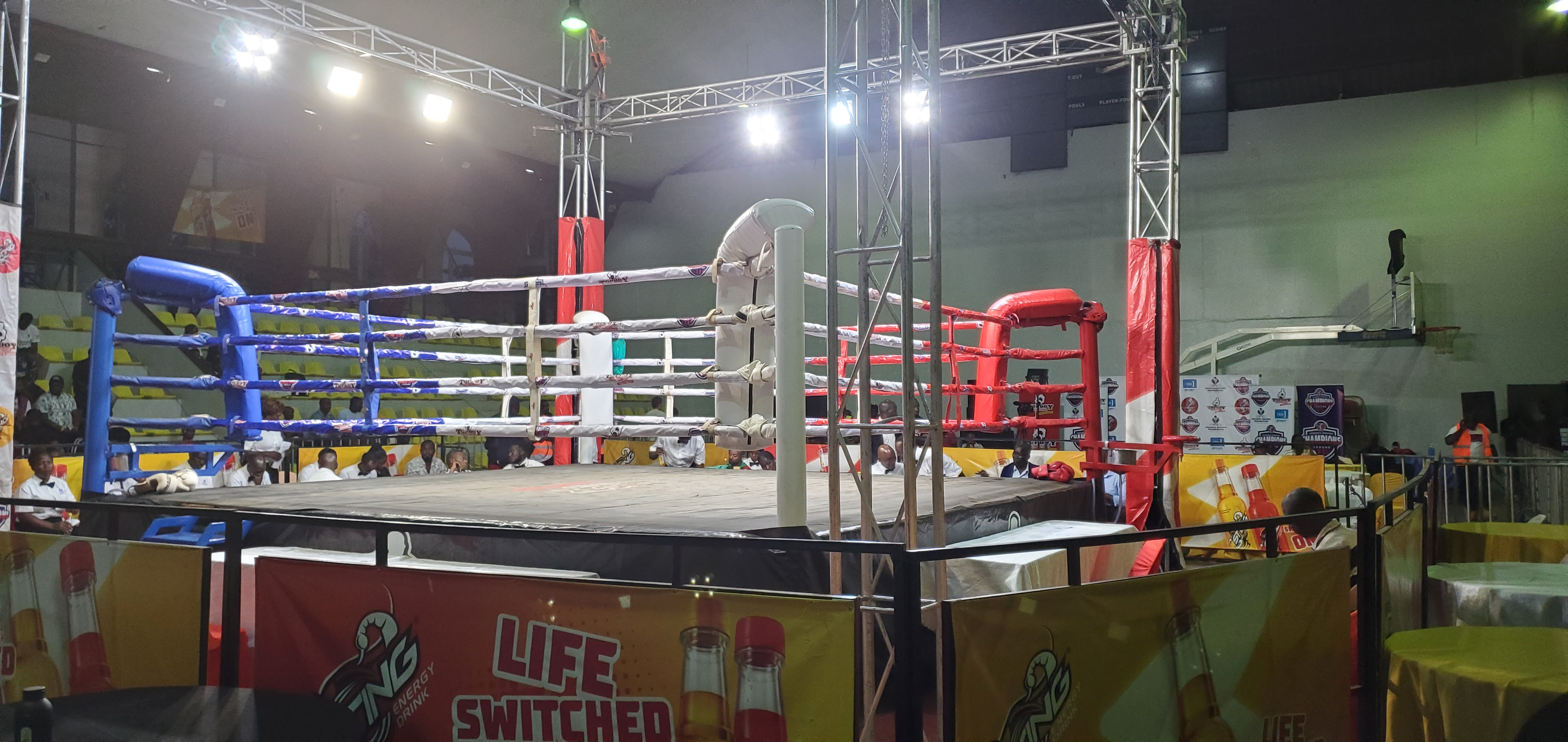
Boxing ring

== Field sizes ==
Sport	Regulated by	Shape	Field length	Total length	Width	Total width	Depth/height	Surface	Diagram
Aquatics
Artistic	World Aquatics	Cuboid	30 meters		20 meters		3 meters		
Diving	World Aquatics	Cuboid	20 meters		25 meters		5 meters		
Swimming (Olympic)	World Aquatics	Cuboid	50 meters	-	25 meters	-	2-3 meters		
Swimming (short course)	World Aquatics	Cuboid	25 meters	-	20 meters	-	2-2.5 meters		
Waterpolo	World Aquatics	Cuboid	25 meters	-	20 meters	-	1.8 meters		
Basketball
3x3	FIBA	Oblong rectangle	11 meters	-	15 meters	-			
Basketball	FIBA	Oblong rectangle	28 meters	-	15 meters	-			
Basketball	NBA	Oblong rectangle	94 feet (29 m)	-	50 feet (15 m)	-			
Basque pelota
Jai alai	FIPV	Rectangular cuboid	54 meters	-	10 meters	-	10 meters		
Mur à gauche	FIPV	Rectangular cuboid	30 meters	-	10 meters	-	10 meters		
Mur à gauche	FIPV	Rectangular cuboid	36 meters	-	10 meters	-	10 meters		
Trinquete	FIPV	Rectangular cuboid	28.5 meters	-	9.3 meters	-	8.5 meters		
Bat and ball sports
Baseball	MLB	Non standardized	250–400 feet (76–122 m) (distance from home plate apex to nearest center field fence)	-	446.9–492.9 feet (136.2–150.2 m)	-		grass and dirt	
Baseball	WBSC	Non standardized	400 feet (120 m) (distance from home plate apex to center field fence)	-	Distance between foul poles (each one are 275 feet (84 m) or more from home plate apex)	-		grass and dirt	
Softball	WBSC	Circular quadrant	220–250 feet (67–76 m) (radius)	-	220–250 feet (67–76 m) (radius)	-		grass and dirt	
Baseball5	WBSC	Square	18 metres (59 ft)	21 metres (69 ft)	18 metres (59 ft)	21 metres (69 ft)	1 metre (3.3 ft) (fence)		
Vitilla		Circular sextant	100 feet (30 m) (radius)	-	100 feet (30 m)	-			
Pesapallo	Finnish Pesäpallo Association	Irregular hexagon	315 feet (96 m)	-	138 feet (42 m)	-	-		
Rounders	GAA	Square	70 meters	-	70 meters	-	.		
Cricket	ICC	Oval	130–180 yards (120–160 m)	-	130–180 yards (120–160 m)	-	-		
Indoor cricket	WICF	Rectangular cuboid	28-30 meters	-	10.5-12 meters	-	4-4.5 meters		
Stoolball	Stoolball England	Circle	90 yards (82 m) (diameter)	-	90 yards (82 m) (diameter)	-			
Lapta	Russian Lapta Federation	Oblong rectangle	40-55 meters	-	25-40 meters	-			
Oină	Romanian Oină Federation	Oblong rectangle	70 meters		32 meters			grass	
Schlagball		Oblong rectangle + trapezium	70 meters	plus an area between divergent diagonals of 140 meters behing rear flags	25 meters	plus an area between divergent diagonals of 140 meters behing rear flags			
Boules
Boccia	BISFed	Oblong rectangle	12.5 meters	-	6 meters	-	-	polished concrete, wooden, natural or synthetic rubber.	
Bocce volo	WPBF	Oblong rectangle	27.5 meters	-	2.5-4 meters	-			
Petanque	WPBF	Oblong rectangle	15 meters	-	4 meters	-			
Raffa	WPBF	Oblong rectangle	6.5 meters	-	4-4.5 meters	-		natural ground or synthetic material	
Combat sports
Amateur boxing	World boxing	Rectangular cuboid	6.1 meters		6.1 meters		1.3 meters	canvas, rubber	
Bare-knuckle boxing	BKFC	Cylinder	22 feet (6.7 m) (diameter)		22 feet (6.7 m) (diameter)				
Amateur wrestling	UWW	Circle	9 meters (diameter)		9 meters (diameter)				
International grappling	UWW	Circle	9 meters (diameter)		9 meters (diameter)				
Amateur MMA	UWW	Circle	9 meters (diameter)		9 meters (diameter)				
Fencing	FIE	Oblong rectangle	14 meters	17–18 meters	1.5 meters	-	-		
Karate	WKF	Square	8 meters		8 meters				
Kickboxing (ring)	WAKO	Rectangular cuboid	5.2 meters		5.2 meters		1.32 meters	felt, rubber	
Kickboxing (tatami)	WAKO	Square	7 meters		7 meters			foam	
Mixed Martial Arts	UFC	Octagonal prism	30 feet (9.1 m)		30 feet (9.1 m)		69 inches (1.8 m)		
Mixed Martial Arts	Bellator MMA	Cylinder	36 feet (11 m) (diameter)		36 feet (11 m) (diameter)		69 inches (1.8 m)		
Muay Thai	IFMA	Rectangular cuboid	6-6.5 meters		6-6.5 meters		1.2-1.5 meters	felt, rubber or other suitable material	
Taekwondo	WT	Octagon	8 meters		8 meters				
Cue sports
Carom	WCBS	Oblong rectangle	2.79-2.89 meters	3.065-3.115 meters	1.37-1.47 meters	1.6245-1.695 meters	0.787-0.837 meters		
Pool	WCBS	Rounded rectangle	100–100.125 inches (2.5400–2.5432 m) (9 feet); 92–92.125 inches (2.3368–2.3400 m) (8 feet)	107.875–115.125 inches (2.7400–2.9242 m) (9 feet); 98.875–107.125 inches (2.5114–2.7210 m) (8 feet)	50–50.125 inches (1.2700–1.2732 m) (9 feet); 46–46.125 inches (1.1684–1.1716 m) (8 feet)	57.875–65.125 inches (1.4700–1.6542 m) (9 feet); 53.875–61.125 inches (1.3684–1.5526 m) (8 feet)	29.25–31 inches (0.743–0.787 m)		
Snooker	WCBS	Oblong rectangle	140–141 inches (3.6–3.6 m)		69.5–70.5 inches (1.77–1.79 m)		33.5–34.5 inches (0.85–0.88 m)		
Cycling
Artistic	UCI	Oblong rectangle	12-14 meters	-	9-11 meters	-	-		
Cycle ball	UCI	Oblong rectangle	12-14 meters	-	9-11 meters	-		wood, parquet, chipboard, triplex, synthetic	
Equestrian
Dressage	FEI	Oblong rectangle	60 meters	-	20 meters	-		sand	
Polo	FIP	Oblong rectangle	250–300 yards (230–270 m)	-	160–200 yards (150–180 m)	-		grass	
Arena polo	FIP	Oblong rectangle	50–100 yards (46–91 m)	-	25–50 yards (23–46 m)	-		snow	
Football codes
Soccer	FIFA	Oblong rectangle	100–130 yards (91–119 m); 110–120 yards (100–110 m) (international)	-	50–100 yards (46–91 m); 70–80 yards (64–73 m) (international)	-		grass, artificial	
Beach soccer	FIFA	Oblong rectangle	35–37 meters	-	26–28 meters	-		sand	
Futsal	FIFA	Oblong rectangle	25-42 meters; 38-42 meters (international)	-	16-25 meters; 20-25 meters (international)	-		wood, artificial	
American	IFAF	Oblong rectangle	100 yards (91 m)	120 yards (110 m)	160 feet (49 m)	-		grass, artificial	
Flag (standard)	IFAF	Oblong rectangle	50 yards (46 m)	70 yards (64 m)	25 yards (23 m)	-	-	solid, sand	
Arena		Rounded rectangle	50 yards (46 m)	66 yards (60 m)	28 yards (26 m)	-		artificial	
Canadian	Football Canada	Oblong rectangle	110 yards (100 m)	150 yards (140 m)	65 yards (59 m)	-		grass, artificial	
Rugby union	World Rugby	Oblong rectangle	94-100 meters	106-144 meters	68-70 meters	-		grass, sand, clay, snow, artificial	
Rugby league	IRL	Oblong rectangle	100 meters	112-122 meters	68 meters	-		grass	
Australian rules (professional)	AFL Commission	Oval	135-185 meters	-	110-155 meters	-		grass	
International rules	AFL Commission and GAA	Oblong rectangle	145 meters	-	90 meters	-		grass	
Gaelic	GAA	Oblong rectangle	130–145 meters	-	80–90 meters	-		grass	
Gymnastics
Artistic (floor)	World Gymnastics	Square	11.97-12.03 meters		11.97-12.03 meters				
Artistic (vault)	World Gymnastics	Oblong rectangle	32.2 meters		2.5 meters				
Rhythmic	World Gymnastics	Square	12.97-13.03 meters		12.97-13.03 meters				
Handball
Indoor and wheelchair	IHF	Oblong rectangle	40 meters	-	20 meters	-			
Beach	IHF	Oblong rectangle	27 meters	-	12 meters	-		sand	
Hockey
Ball hockey	ISBHF	Rounded cuboid	56-61 meters	-	26-30 meters	-	Boards (1.02-1.22 meters height) + protective glass (1.6-4 meters height) + protective end zone net	asphalt	
Bandy	FIB	Oblong rectangle	100-110 meters	-	60-65 meters	-		ice	
Rink bandy	FIB	Oblong rectangle	45-60 meters	-	26-31 meters	-	Boards: 15-122 centimeters height		
Field	FIH	Oblong rectangle	100 yards (91 m)	-	60 yards (55 m)	-			
Indoor	FIH	Oblong rectangle	36-44 meters	-	18-22 meters	-			
Beach	FIH	Oblong rectangle	30-35 meters	-	20-25 meters	-		sand	
Floorball	IFF	Rounded cuboid	36-40 meters	-	18-20 meters	-			
Ice	IIHF	Rounded cuboid	61 meters	-	30 meters	-	Boards (1.07-2.4 meters height) + protective glass (1.8-4 meters height) + protective net	ice	
Ice	NHL	Rounded cuboid	200 feet (61 m)	-	85 feet (26 m)	-		ice	
Inline	World Skate	Rounded cuboid	131–197 feet (40–60 m)	-	66–98 feet (20–30 m)	-	Boards: 40–48 inches (1.0–1.2 m) height	sport tile, wood, asphalt or cement	
Quad	World Skate	Rounded cuboid	34-44 meters	-	17-22 meters	-	Boards: 1 meter height	wood, cement	
Unicycle	IUF	Rounded rectangle	35-45 meters	-	20-25 meters	-			
Underwater	CMAS	Rectangular cuboid	21-25 meters	-	12-15 meters	-	2-3.65 meters		
Ice skating
Ice dance	ISU	Oblong rectangle	56-60 meters	-	26-30 meters	-		ice	
Speed skating (Long track)	ISU	Stadium	178 meters	-	66 meters	-	-	ice	
Speed skating (Short track)	ISU	Stadium	60 meters	-	30 meters	-	-	ice	
Korfball
Korfball	IKF	Oblong rectangle	40 meters	-	20 meters	-			
Beach	IKF	Oblong rectangle	20 meters	-	10 meters	-		sand	
Outdoor	IKF	Oblong rectangle	40-60 meters		20-30 meters				
Lacrosse
Field	World Lacrosse	Oblong rectangle	110 meters	-	60 meters	-			
Women	World Lacrosse	Oblong rectangle	100 meters	-	50-60 meters	-			
Box	World Lacrosse	Oblong rectangle	55-61 meters	-	24-28 meters	-		artificial turf, concrete	
Sixes	World Lacrosse	Oblong rectangle	70 meters	-	36 meters	-			
Intercrosse		Oblong rectangle	40 meters	-	20 meters	-		wood	
Netball
Netball	World Netball	Oblong rectangle	100 feet (30 m)	-	50 feet (15 m)	-		wood	
FAST5	World Netball	Oblong rectangle	100 feet (30 m)	-	50 feet (15 m)	-		wood	
Racquet sports
Badminton	BWF	Oblong rectangle	44 feet (13 m)	17.4 meters	17 feet (5.2 m); 20 feet (6.1 m) (doubles)	8.18 meters; 9.1 meters (doubles)			
Padel	FIP	Rectangular cuboid	19.9-20.1 meters	-	9.95-10.05 meters	-	4 meters		
Squash (singles)	World Squash	Cuboid	9.75 meters	-	6.40 meters	-	4.57 meters		
Squash (doubles)	World Squash	Cuboid	9.75 meters	-	8.42 meters	-	4.57 meters		
Table tennis	ITTF	Oblong rectangle	2.74 meters	14 meters (playing space)	1.525 meters	7 meters (playing space)	76 centimeters 91.25 centimeters (including net)		
Tennis	ITF	Oblong rectangle	78 feet (24 m)	37 meters	27 feet (8.2 m); 36 feet (11 m) (doubles)	18 meters		clay, grass, hard	
Beach tennis	ITF	Oblong rectangle	16 meters		4.5 meters; 8 meters (doubles)			sand	
Roller racing
Inline speed skating	World Skate	Stadium	50 meters (100 m lap); 60 meters (125-200 m lap)		25 meters (100 m lap); 30 meters (125-200 m lap)				
Roller derby	World Skate	Stadium	108 feet (33 m)		75 yards (69 m)				
Tag games
Kabaddi (standard)	IKF	Oblong rectangle	13 meters	-	10 meters	-	-		
Kabaddi (circle-style)		Circle	44 meters	-	44 meters	-	-		
Kho kho	IKKF	Oblong rectangle	27 meters	30 meters	16 meters	19 meters	-		
Kho kho (Ultimate)		Oblong rectangle	22 meters	26 meters	16 meters	20 meters	-		
Tchoukball
Tchoukball	FITB	Oblong rectangle	26-29 meters	-	15-17 meters	-			
Beach	FITB	Oblong rectangle	21-23 meters	-	11-13 m	-		sand	
Track and field
Indoor	World Athletics	Stadium	90.03 meters	-	45.78 meters	-	-		
Outdoor	World Athletics	Stadium	176.91 meters	-	92.52 meters	-	-		
Ultimate
Ultimate	WFDF	Oblong rectangle	64 meters	100 meters	37 meters	-	-		
Beach	WFDF	Oblong rectangle	49 yards (45 m)	82 yards (75 m)	27 yards (25 m)	-	-	sand	
Volleyball
Volleyball	FIVB	Oblong rectangle	18 meters	24-31 m	9 meters	15-19 meters		wooden, synthetic	
Beach and Beach 4x4	FIVB	Oblong rectangle	16 meters	20-28m	8 meters	18-20 meters		sand	
Snow	FIVB	Oblong rectangle	16 meters	22 meters	8 meters	14 meters		snow	
Sitting	WPV	Oblong rectangle	10 meters	16 meters	6 meters	12 meters		wooden, synthetic	
Other
Bowling	IBF	Oblong rectangle	754.1875 inches (19.15636 m)		41–42 inches (1.0–1.1 m)			wood or synthetic material	
Canoe polo	ICF	Oblong rectangle	35 meters		23 meters			water	
Dodgeball	WDA	Oblong rectangle	17 meters	-	8 meters	-	-		
Fistball	IFA	Oblong rectangle	50 meters	62 meters	20 meters	32 meters			
Gaelic games	GAA	Oblong rectangle	145 meters	-	90 meters	-		grass	
Goalball	IBSA	Oblong rectangle	18 meters	-	9 meters	-		wood, plastic or synthetic	
International game	CIJB	Oblong rectangle	70 meters	-	20 meters	-	-	Concrete or asphalt	
One-wall handball	CIJB	Oblong rectangle	10.6 meters	-	6.1 meters	-	4.9 meters		
Sepak takraw	ISTAF	Oblong rectangle	44 feet (13 m)	19.4 meters	20 feet (6.1 m)	12.1 meters			
Shinty	Camanachd Association	Oblong rectangle	140–170 yards (130–160 m)	-	70–80 yards (64–73 m)	-			
Weightlifting	IWF	Square	4 meters		4 meters			hardwood	
Wheelchair rugby	WWR	Oblong rectangle	28 meters	-	15 meters	-			
Field size comparisons Different sports Baseball and Cricket Basketball Ice hockey Ice hockey and long/short track Football codes American and Arena football Association football Soccer and Polo

== Game court ==
Game court is one of the names for a multi-sport athletic space, typically constructed outdoors, where such games as basketball, volleyball, paddle tennis and other racquet sports, and up to a dozen more games and activities can be played. They are usually smaller than a regulation tennis (120' x 60') or basketball (84'x50') court, although there is no set dimensions or size for a game court. The game-court concept was popularized by Sport Court in the 1970s, and some generic references are made to game courts as 'sport courts', although that is a trademark of Connor Sport Court International, LLC. Game courts are often found in residential backyards, giving families and children opportunities for healthy recreation close to home.

Game courts are usually constructed using a rectangular sub-base made from concrete or asphalt, then covered with an open-grid modular polypropylene (or similar) sports surface to improve safety. Most feature athletic equipment such as basketball goals, net systems for racquet sports, volleyball and badminton, lights for nighttime play, fencing or ball containment netting, hockey/soccer goals, lines or markings for various sports, and practice or training components can also be incorporated into the design.

=== Surface ===
The surface of a game court—as opposed to simply playing on concrete or asphalt—is designed for safe play and to reduce injury. Many people have started to use suspended athletic courts to cover old athletic courts like tennis courts and basketball courts. The surface should provide appropriate traction for various types of sports and activities, as well as shock or force reduction to minimize overuse and stress injuries.

Game courts are typically custom-designed to the interests of the family or organization, and are versatile in enabling a wide variety of sports to be played in a relatively small space. Some activities played on a game court are enjoyable modifications of other sports (such as short-court tennis) that allow for similar skills to be developed as the 'regulation' game, but on a reduced-scale court size. A typical game court of 50 by 30 feet (15.2 m × 9.1 m) might include a basketball key and 3-point line arranged around a hoop, overlaid by short-court tennis or pickleball lines (which can also be used for volleyball or badminton) along the longer dimension.

=== Ball containment ===
Game courts for private use will frequently be built with a high fence surrounding the surface to allow for containment of the ball used in play, and, if required, to prevent people from entering. Any of several materials have been used, including chain-link fencing, welded wire mesh fence, and fabric mesh or netting.

== See also ==
- Goal
- Ice rink
- Line marker (sports)
- Running track
- Sports venue
