= Estonian Boules Federation =

Sports governing body in Estonia

Estonian Boules Federation (abbreviation EBF; Estonian: Eesti Petanque'i Klubide Liit) is one of the sport governing bodies in Estonia which deals with boules.

EBF was established on 30 January 1993. It is a member of the Fédération Internationale de Boules (FIB) and Estonian Olympic Committee.
