= World Pétanque and Bowls Federation =

Sports organization

- Type: Sports federation
- Headquarters: Lausanne
- Website: https://wpbf-fmbp.org/index.php/en/

The World Pétanque and Bowls Federation (WPBF) is the international organization, recognized by the International Olympic Committee, which governs the sport of the boules.

== History ==
The CMSB – Confédération Mondiale des Sports de Boules – was created (on 21 December 1985 in Monaco) by three international boules organizations:

- CBI Confederazione Boccistica Internazionale (bocce)
- FIB Fédération Internationale de Boules (Bocce volo)
- FIPJP Fédération Internationale de Pétanque et Jeu Provençal (pétanque and jeu provençal)

for the purpose of lobbying the Olympic committee to make boules sports part of the summer Olympics. World Bowls (bowls) was also a member from 2003 until 2013. World Bowls re-joined WPBF in March 2026. Boules and the CMSB were granted consideration for entry to the Olympic Games on 15 October 1986, but have never been granted the status of an official Olympic sport. Nevertheless, every year the CMSB continues to re-present its application.

== Recognition ==
The WPBF a sports federation recognized by the following confederations.

- International Olympic Committee (IOC)
- Association of the IOC Recognised International Sports Federations (ARISF)
- SportAccord (GAISF)

== See also ==
- Boules at the Summer Olympics
- Boules sports at the World Games
