= Croatian Bocce Federation =

Governing body of bocce in Croatia

The Croatian Bocce Federation (Croatian: Hrvatski boćarski savez, HBS) is the governing body of the game of bocce in Croatia. The federation's president is Nediljko Rojnica.

The HBS was founded in 1950. It currently organizes the following competitions:

- Croatian First Bocce League
- Croatian Second Bocce League
- Croatian Third Bocce League
- Croatian Bocce Cup

The HBS also organizes a national team.
