= Croatian First Bocce League =

The Croatian First Bocce League is the highest level of bocce competition in Croatia. It has been held annually since the nation's independence in 1991 and is organized by the Croatian Bocce Federation.

== Champions ==
- 1991 - BK Nada Split
- 1992 - BK Zrinjevac-Hortikultura Zagreb
- 1993 - BK Zrinjevac Zagreb
- 1994 - BK Zrinjevac Zagreb
- 1995 - BK Zrinjevac Zagreb
- 1996 - BK Zrinjevac Zagreb
- 1997 - BK Zrinjevac Zagreb
- 1998 - BK Zrinjevac Zagreb
- 1999 - BK Rikard Benčić Rijeka
- 2000 - BK Istra Poreč
- 2001 - BK Rikard Benčić Rijeka
- 2002 - BK Istra Poreč
- 2003 - BK Istra Poreč
- 2004 - BK Istra Poreč
- 2005 - BK Trio Buzet
- 2006 - BK Zrinjevac Zagreb
- 2007 - BK Rikard Benčić Rijeka
- 2008 - BK Trio Buzet
- 2009 - BK Trio Buzet
