= Raffa (boules) =

Type of sport

- Highest governing body: Confederazione Boccistica Internazionale
- First played: 18th century in Italy

Characteristics
- Contact: Non-contact
- Team members: Individual, team
- Type: Bocce
- Equipment: Bocce (balls) & pallino (jack)

Presence
- Olympic: No
- World Games: 2009 – 2017

Raffa, also known as raffa bocce or roundup, is a specialty, both male and female, of bocce. It is governed by Confederazione Boccistica Internazionale (CBI).

Along with pétanque and bocce volo, it is one of the three specialties proposed by the Confédération Mondiale des Sports de Boules (all of which are included in the World Games) as possible new disciplines for the 2024 Summer Olympics.

== Rules ==
The specialty is named after the "raffa shot", a special shot made to strike - on the fly or with the help of the ground - a certain piece (jack or balls) indicated in advance; all pieces placed within 13 cm of that indicated are valid.

Raffa can be played individually, in pairs or in trio. Matches end at 12 points, while the finals end at 15 points.

The name Raffa derives from Raffaele Bisteghi who described the game in the book "Gioco delle bocchie" in 1753.
