= Boules at the 1900 Summer Olympics =

Boules was on the Summer Olympic Games programme in 1900. Boules events have generally not been classified as official, although the IOC has never decided which events were "Olympic" and which were not. As with the sport of croquet, generally regarded as "official", boules satisfied three of four retrospective criteria — restriction to amateurs, open to all nations, open to all competitors and without handicapping. As with croquet, there were only French players. All other "official" events met all four criteria.

== Results ==
Jeu Lyonnais: France 21, France 11

Partie de Berges: France 9, France 1

== See also ==
- 1900 Summer Olympics
- Boules
