= Boules =

Range of games similar to bowls and bocce

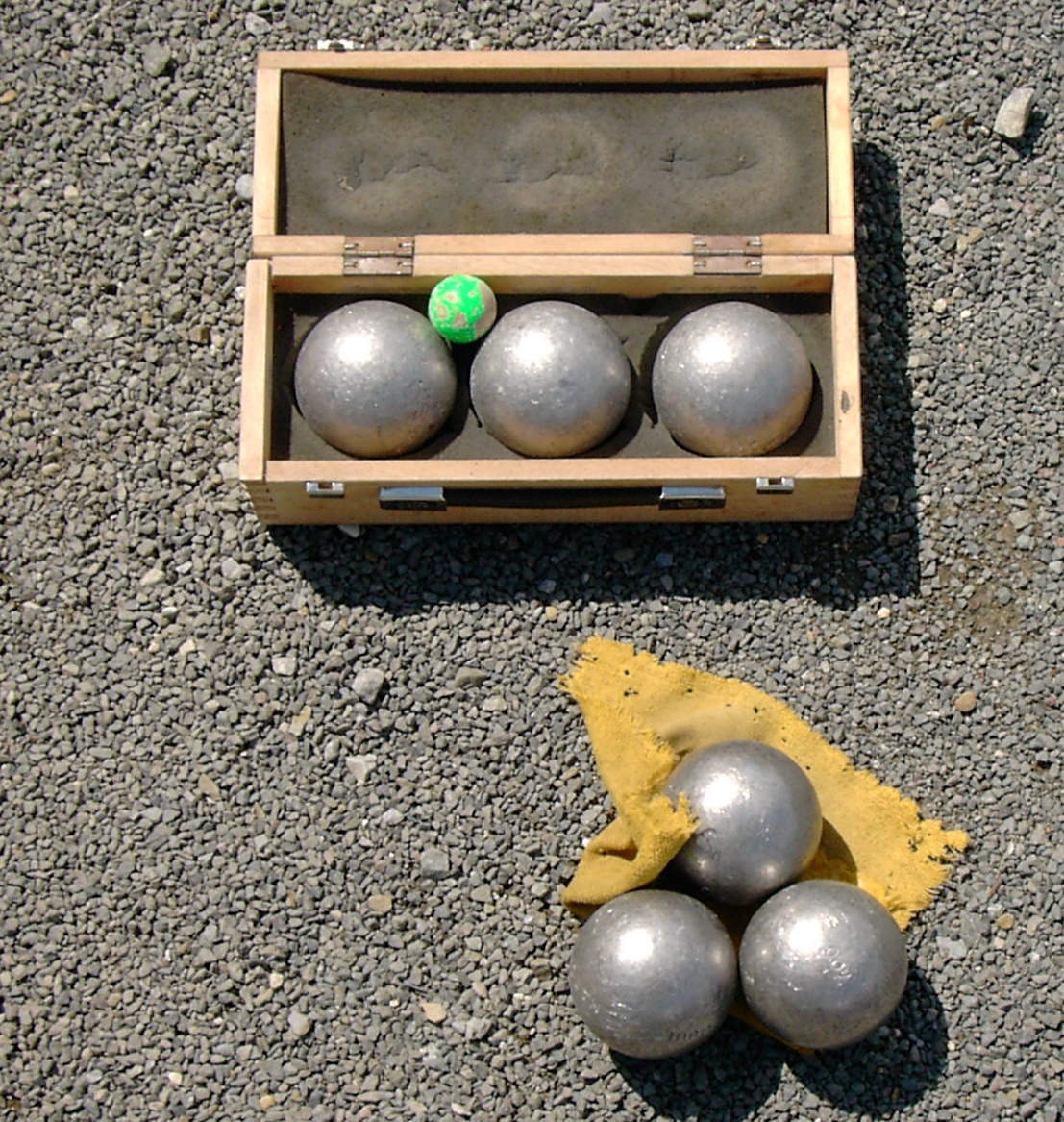
Boules

Boules (/buːl/, French pronunciation: [bul]), or jeu de boules, is a collective name for a wide range of games similar to bowls and bocce in which the objective is to throw or roll heavy balls as closely as possible to a small target ball, called the jack. 'Boules' itself is a French loanword that usually refers to the game especially played in France.

Boules-type games are traditional and popular in many European countries and are also popular in some former French colonies in Africa and Asia. Boules games are often played in open spaces (town squares and parks) in villages and towns. Dedicated playing areas for boules-type games are typically large, level, rectangular courts made of flattened earth, gravel, or crushed stone, enclosed in wooden rails or back boards. To win, a team must reach 15 points, with a few exceptions.

== Boules games in history ==
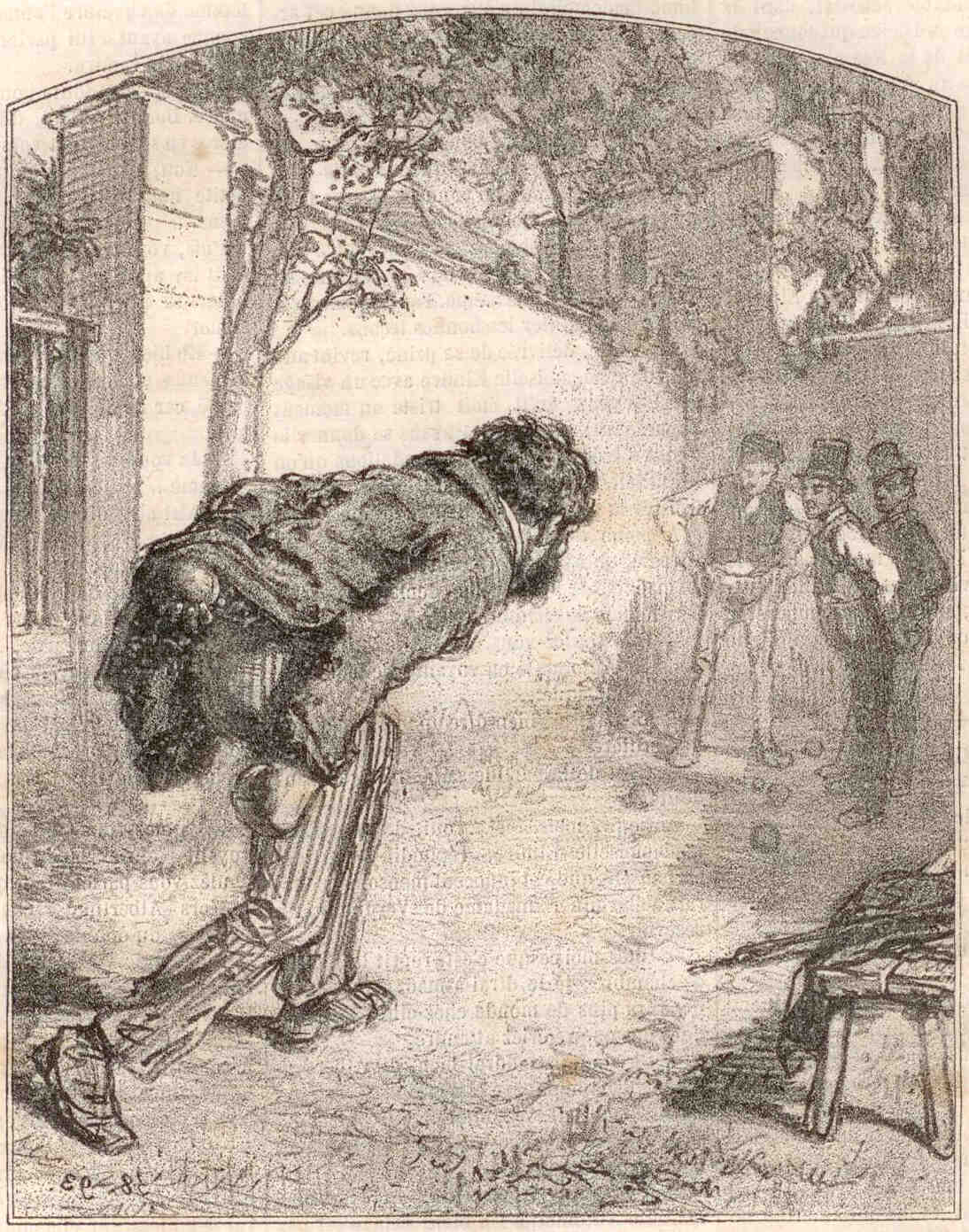
Boules player, by Paul Gavarni, 1858

As early as the 6th century BC the ancient Greeks are recorded to have played a game of tossing coins, then flat stones, and later stone balls, called spheristics, trying to have them go as far as possible. The ancient Romans modified the game by adding a target that had to be approached as closely as possible. This Roman variation was brought to Provence by Roman soldiers and sailors. A Roman sepulchre (now in the Campana Collection in the Louvre) shows children playing this game, stooping down to measure the points.

After the Romans, the stone balls were replaced by wooden balls. In the Middle Ages, Erasmus referred to the game as globurum in Latin, but it became commonly known as boules (i.e. 'balls'), and it was played throughout Europe. King Henry III of England banned the playing of the game by his archers – he wanted them to be practicing archery, not playing boules. In the 14th century, Charles IV and Charles V of France forbade the sport to commoners; only in the 17th century was the ban lifted.

By the 19th century, in England the game had become bowls or "lawn bowling". In France it was known as boules and was played throughout the country. The French artist Meissonnier made two paintings showing people playing the game, and Honoré de Balzac described a match in La Comédie Humaine.

In the South of France, the game evolved into jeu provençal (or boule lyonnaise), in which players rolled their boules or ran three steps before throwing a boule. The game was extremely popular in France in the second half of the 19th century (the first official club was established in France in 1854). It was played informally in villages all over Provence, usually on squares of land in the shade of plane trees. Matches of jeu provençal around the start of the 20th century are memorably described in the memoirs of novelist Marcel Pagnol.

In 1910, an offshoot of jeu provençal called pétanque was developed in the town of La Ciotat, in Provence. It eventually became the dominant boules sport in France, and is widely played in other European countries.

== Types ==
Boules games may be sub-divided into two categories based on typical throwing technique:

- games where the balls are rolled (for example, bocce)
- games where the balls are thrown (for example, pétanque, bocce volo)

Boules games may also be subdivided into two other categories based on typical throwing technique:

- games where there is a "run up" to the throw (for example, boule lyonnaise, bocce volo)
- games where there is no "run up" to the throw (for example, pétanque)

Alternatively, boules games may be subdivided into categories based on the structure and material of the ball:

- games where the balls are solid and made out of wood, or a wood-like plastic, composite, or epoxy resin similar to billiard balls (for example, bocce)
- games where the balls are hollow and made out of metal, typically steel or bronze (for example, pétanque, bocce volo)
- games where the balls are stuffed and made out of leather or some similar soft material (boccia, "soft pétanque")

Alternatively, boules games may be subdivided into categories based on the shape of the ball:

- games where the balls are spherical (most boules games)
- games where the balls are not spherical, but have a shape bias designed to cause the ball to travel a curved path (bowls)

There may be other variations as well, for instance in the way the ball is launched, in the dimensions of the playing area, whether obstacles (such as trees) are considered in-bounds or out-of-bounds, and whether it is legal to play balls off of enclosing boards or obstacles.

- Balls are typically thrown underhand (as in softball) rather than overhand (as in baseball). In games where the balls are rolled, the delivery is typically done with the palm of the hand up, whereas in games where the balls are thrown, the delivery is typically done palm down. A palm-down delivery can give a thrown ball backspin, which helps to keep it from rolling away from the spot to which it has been thrown.
- Bocce, a rolling game, is played on a smooth, prepared court with markers and sideboards; the sideboards are a recognized part of the game and shots may be bounced off of the sideboards. In contrast, pétanque, a throwing game, can be played on almost any relatively flat, unprepared outdoor surface. Sideboards are not a recognized part of the game — although an out-of-play line (or "dead boule line") is.

Finally, some boules games (bocce, pétanque) began as variations of earlier games, deliberately created and designed to accommodate the needs of players with physical disabilities.

Such variations produce a wide variety of boules-type games played all over the world.

== Terminology ==
- Boule is a French word for 'ball'.
- Boccia (plural: bocce) is an Italian word for 'ball'
- Volo (roughly, 'flying' or 'in flight') is derived from the Italian verb volare meaning 'to fly'
- The small wooden target ball is usually called the jack in English, le but ('target') or cochonnet ('piglet') in French, or pallino ('little ball' or 'bullet') in Italian.

In Italian bocce, balls may be thrown in three ways: punto, raffa and volo.

- A punto shot or puntata is the way of pointing a ball by rolling the ball as close as possible to the pallino.
- A raffa or raffata shot is the way of knocking an opponent's ball away that is very close to the pallino by rolling very fast. The player is allowed to make a run of two to four steps before delivering the ball.
- A volo shot is the way of hitting an opponent's ball that is very close to the pallino by throwing through the air and hitting directly the opponent's boule (or the pallino), with the restriction that the ball may first strike the ground within 50 cm of the target.

== Balls ==
There is a wide variation in the size and materials of the balls used in boules-type games.

Originally, in ancient Egypt, Greece, and Rome, the balls were probably made of stone.

Gallic tribes, which were introduced to boules by the Romans, used wooden boules. In 19th-century France, boules were typically made of a very hard wood, boxwood root.

In the mid-19th century, techniques were developed for the mass production of iron nails. Following this technological improvement, boxwood balls studded with nails (boules cloutées) were introduced in an effort to improve the durability of the balls. This eventually led to the development of balls that were completely covered in nails, creating a ball that appeared almost to be made of metal.

By the 1920s, the growing popularity of boules in France created a demand that could not be satisfied using the available supplies of natural boxwood root, which were beginning to disappear. Paul Courtieu and Vincent Miles had the idea of manufacturing a ball made entirely of metal. Avoiding steel-based alloys (which were too hard and rust-prone) they developed an alloy based on aluminum and bronze, and (in 1923) patented a metal ball made of two welded-together hemispheres. A year later, in 1924, they filed a patent for a ball that was cast in a single piece -- La Boule intégrale. Louis Tarchier and Jean Blanc are generally credited with developing, around 1925, the process by which virtually all metal boules are manufactured today—steel blanks are pressed into hollow hemispheres which are then soldered together and machined to make a hollow steel boule.

Today, some boules sports (e.g. bocce) still use wooden (or epoxy composite) balls, while others (e.g. pétanque) use metal balls. The wooden balls used in bocce tend to be bigger than the smaller metal balls used in pétanque.

== Games ==
The same game can be known by different names in different languages and locations or the same name can be used for different local variations of a game.

The category of boules games includes the following:

- Bocce is the ancestral sport of most boules games. It is a rolling game using wooden balls and a run-up throwing technique.
- Bocce volo (boule lyonnaise) is a throwing game using metal balls and a rather complicated run-up.
- Boccia is a form of bocce adapted for players who use wheelchairs and has been part of the Paralympic Games since the 1984 Summer Paralympics.
- Bolas criollas is a bocce-like game played in Venezuela
- Bowls or "lawn bowls" is a British game similar to bocce
- Jeu provençal or boule lyonnaise, similar to bocce volo
- Pétanque originally evolved from jeu provençal as an adaptation for a player with a disability affecting the legs. However, it quickly became popular among able-bodied players. It is a throwing game using metal balls, but there is no run-up. Players' feet must remain firmly on the ground.
- Punto, raffa, volo (note that this is a single name consisting of three comma-separated words) is a type of bocce governed by the Italian Confederazione Boccistica Internazionale (CBI).

== International boules organizations ==
The World Pétanque and Bowls Federation (WPBF) was created (on 21 December 1985 in Monaco) by three international boules organizations for the purpose of lobbying the Olympic committee to make boules sports part of the summer Olympics. To date, its efforts have been unsuccessful. However, boccia has been part of the Paralympic Games since the 1984 Summer Paralympics. The organizations that joined together to create the CMSB were the following:

- Confederazione Boccistica Internazionale (CBI) (raffa)
- Fédération Internationale de Boules (FIB) (boule Lyonnaise)
- Fédération Internationale de Pétanque et Jeu Provençal (FIPJP) (pétanque)

== Main games ==
Sport		Boccia	Bocce volo		Petanque		Raffa	
Image								
Country of origin		Sweden			France		Italy	
Governing Body		BISFed	WPBF					
Pitch	Shape	Rectangular	Rectangular					
Pitch	Length	12.5 meters	27.5 meters		15 meters		6.5 meters	
Pitch	Width	6 meters	2.5-4 meters		4 meters		4-4.5 meters	
Pitch	Surface	polished concrete, wooden, natural or synthetic rubber.					natural ground or synthetic material	
Ball	Type	All	bowl	jack	boule	jack	bowl	pallino
Ball	Circumference	26.2-27.8 cm	-	-	-	-	-	-
Ball	Diameter		8.9-11.1 centimeters	3.5-3.7 centimeters	7.05-8 centimeters	2.9-3.1 centimeters	10.55-10.75 centimeters	3.9-4.1 centimeters
Ball	Weight	263-287 grams	900-1200 grams	23-27 grams	650-800 grams	10-18 grams	895-925 grams	83-97 grams
Ball	Material	vinyl, polyurethane fabric, leather, synthetic leather, suede	metal or synthetic	wood	metal	wood or synthetic	synthetic	
Tournaments	World championship	Yes			Yes			
Tournaments	Olympic	yes (paralympic)	No					
Tournaments	World Games	No	Yes				2009-2017	
Tournaments	Professional leagues							

== See also ==
- Klootschieten
- Varpa
- Curling, essentially a variant of boules played on ice
- Bowls
