= Jeu provençal =

French form of boules

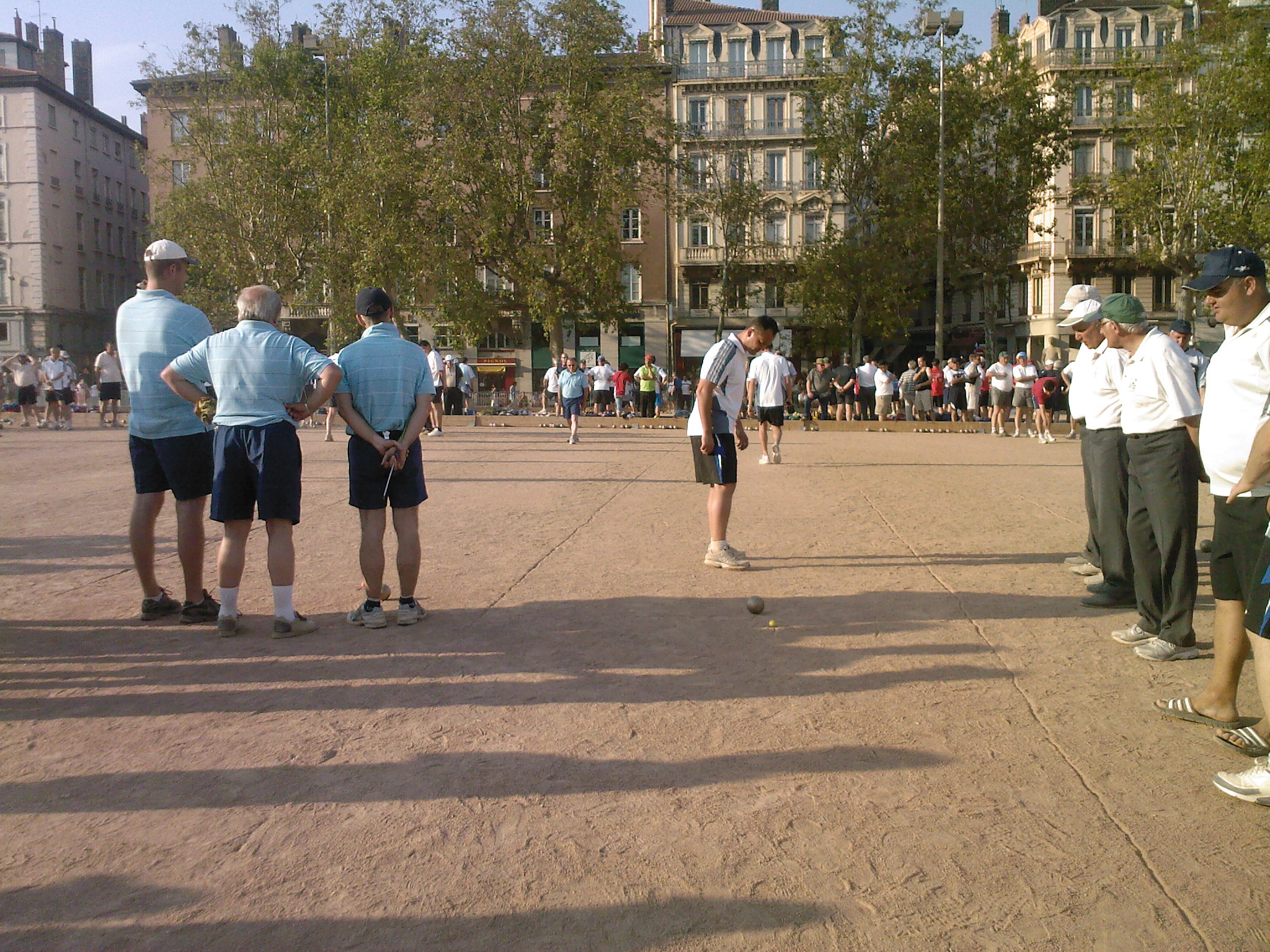
Jeu provençal being played in Lyon

Jeu provençal ('game of Provence'; also longue provençale or the Provençale) is a French form of boules during which the games are played on the move on a pitch measuring between fifteen and twenty metres, which is twice as long as that used for pétanque, of which it is the predecessor. The bocce volo (or boule lyonnaise), which is played with bronze balls, follows a similar set of rules.

== History ==
The current version of the game developed during the 18th century around the area of Lyon.

- The Fédération Lyonnaise et Régionale was formed in 1906.
- About the same time, in 1907, the sport of pétanque split off to become its own sport.
- It led to the formation of Fédération Nationale des Boules in 1933.
- That became the Fédération Française de Boules in 1942.

== Rules ==
The rules are similar to the game of pétanque except that:

- A jeu provençal court is about twice the size of a pétanque court.
- In jeu provençal, the normal practice is to take a short run-up to the throw. (In pétanque, the feet are fixed in one spot while throwing.)

These differences reflect the reason that pétanque was invented to create a sport that was accessible to an arthritic player who could no longer make the run-up to a throw.

In addition:

- in jeu provençal (as in bocce), each player has four boules when playing as singles (in pétanque, each has three).

== Grounds and equipment ==
Under official rules, the court must measure 27.5 metres (30.1 yd) in length and between 2.5 to 4 metres (2.7 to 4.4 yd) in width, with a clear play area of 12.5 metres (13.7 yd) and 7.5 metres (8.2 yd) at each end (one end is the Landing zone, and the other is where the players stand and throw).

When the jack is thrown, it must land at least 12.5 metres (13.7 yd) away from the player.

== Boules ==
The boules vary in size, weight, and composition, usually to accommodate the player's comfort, but tend to be made of bronze (with the jack being wooden) and are usually 90 to 110 millimetres (3.5 to 4.3 in) in diameter and weigh 900 to 1,200 grams (2.0 to 2.6 lb). They must be centrally balanced.
