= Fédération Internationale de Boules =

International sports governing body

Fédération Internationale de Boules (International Boules Federation) (abbreviated FIB) is part of the "World Pétanque and Bowls Federation" which is the highest international authority of bocce sports acknowledged by the International Olympic Committee. The current FIB president is Frédéric Ruis from France.

FIB governs the sport of bocce volo, also known as boule lyonnaise.

== Members ==
FIB has 51 member associations on all continents (except Antarctica).

== History ==
The need for a single body to oversee bocce associations became clear shortly after World War II. The spiritual father of FIB, André Mignot, started negotiations among French, Swiss and Italian bocce associations. FIB was founded in Ville-la-Grand (France) on April 14, 1946, and the first official international competition took place the next year. During the next 60 years the number of associations increased from only four (France, Italy, Monaco and Switzerland) to more than 50.

== See also ==
- Association of the IOC Recognised International Sports Federations
