= Bocce =

Ball sport

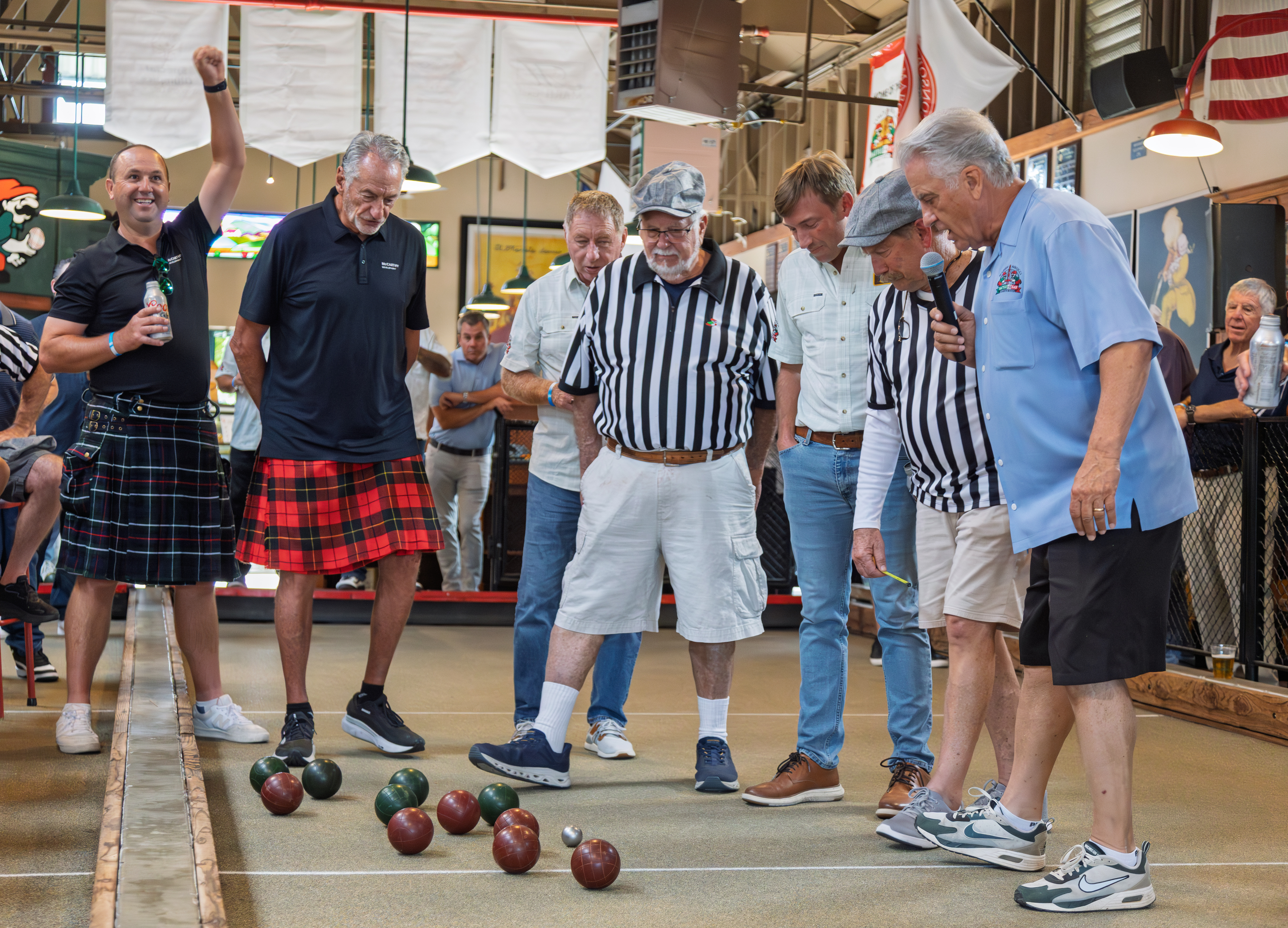
- Bocce players, 2026
- Highest governing body: Fédération Internationale de Boules
- Nicknames: Bocci
- First played: 18th century, Italy

Characteristics
- Contact: Non-contact
- Team members: Singles and doubles
- Mixed-sex: Yes, separate tours and mixed doubles
- Type: Ball games
- Equipment: Bocce (balls) and pallino (jack)

Presence
- Country or region: Worldwide
- Olympic: No
- Paralympic: No
- World Games: No

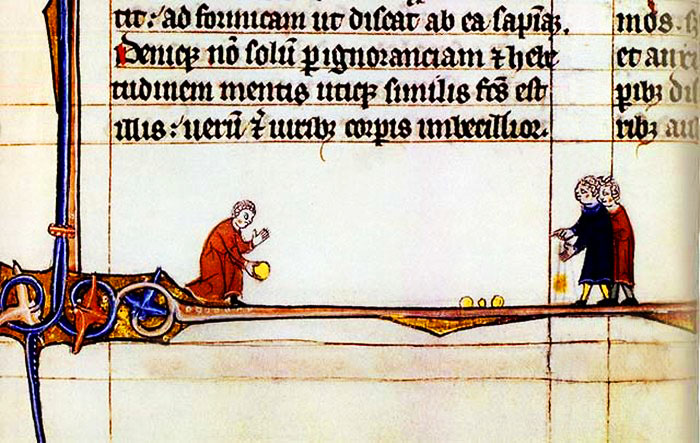
An image of bocce embedded in a medieval manuscript

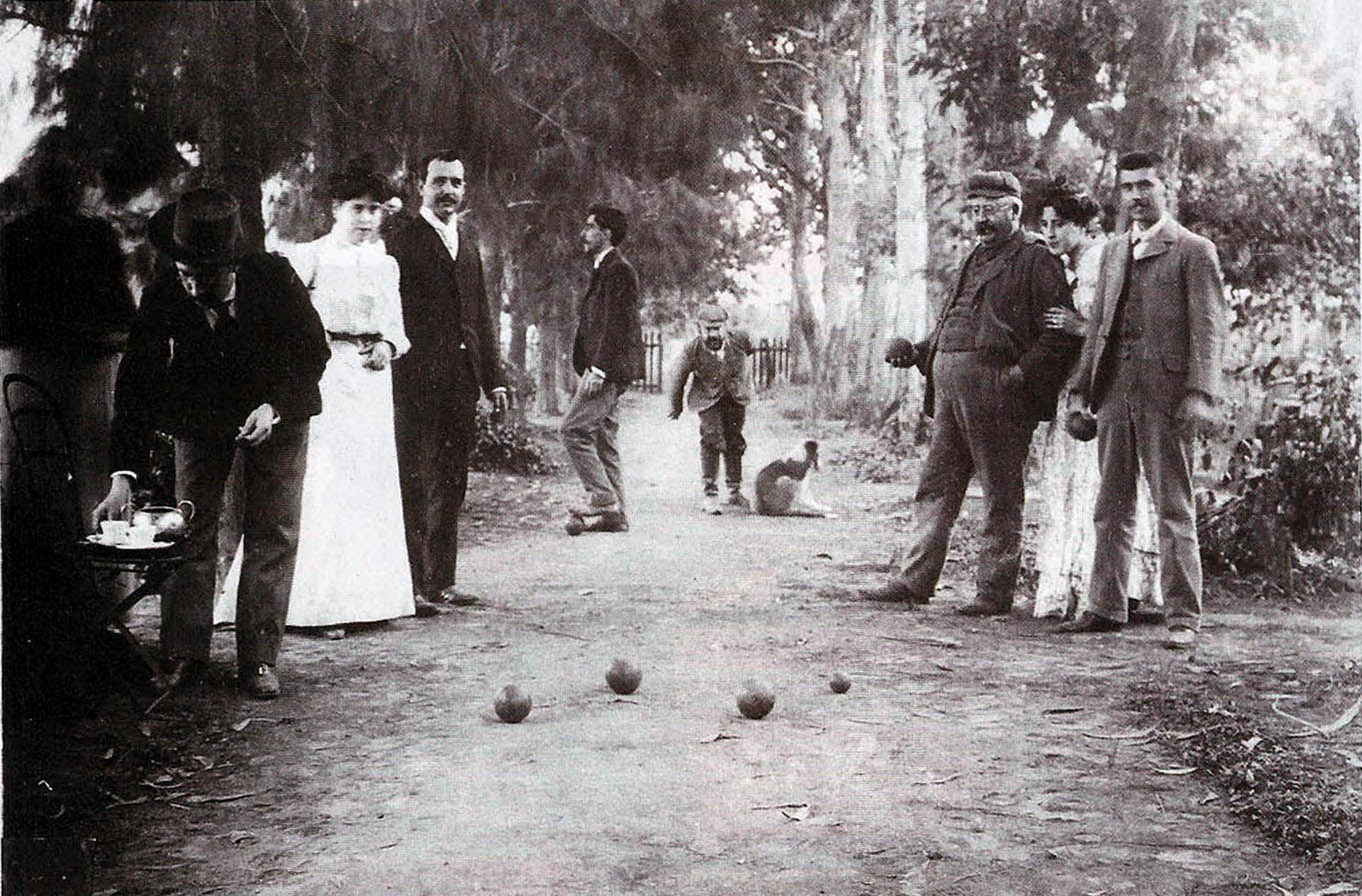
An Argentine family playing bocce in San Vicente, Buenos Aires, c. 1902

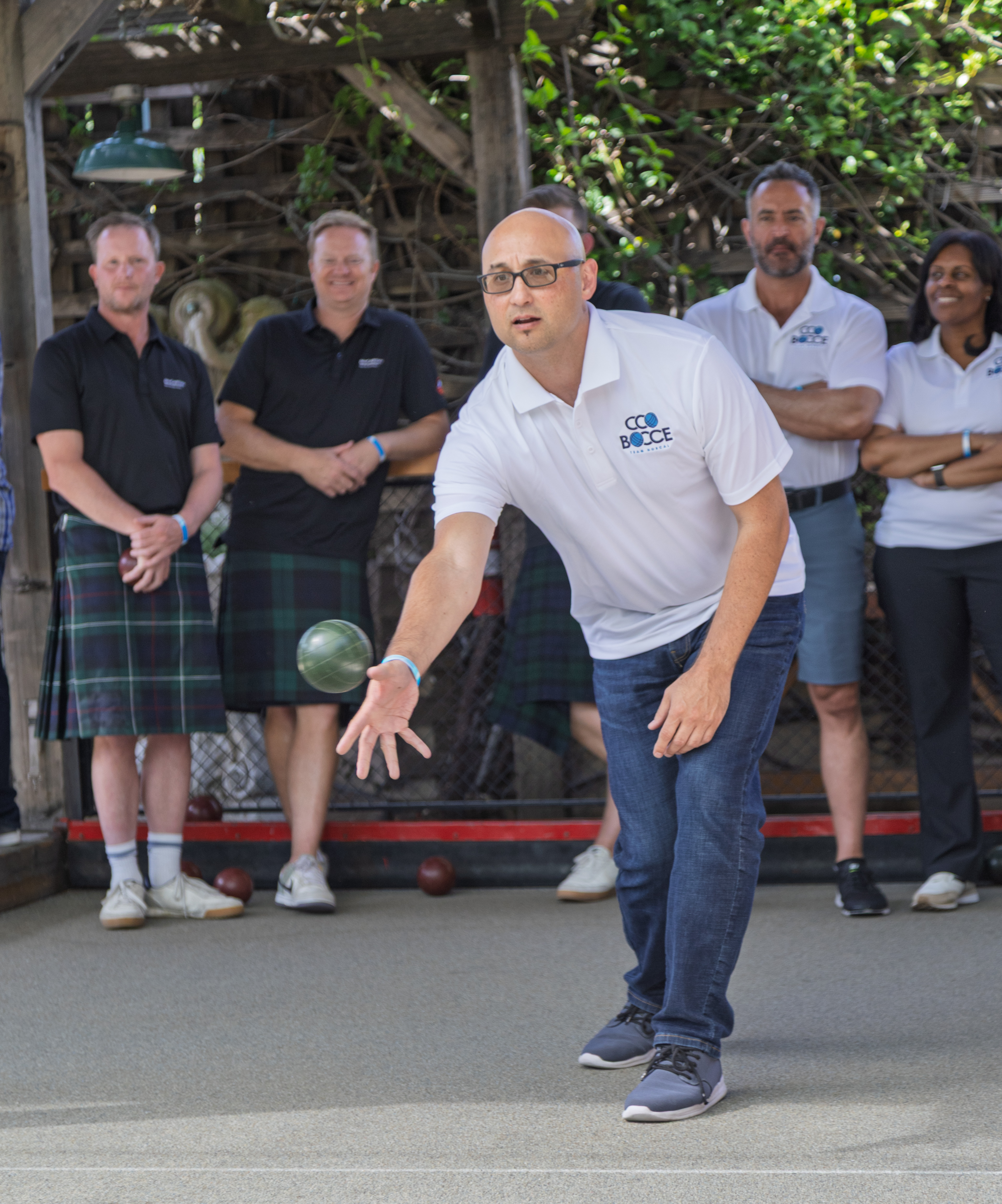
Bocce play in Los Gatos, California, United States in 2026

Bocce being played

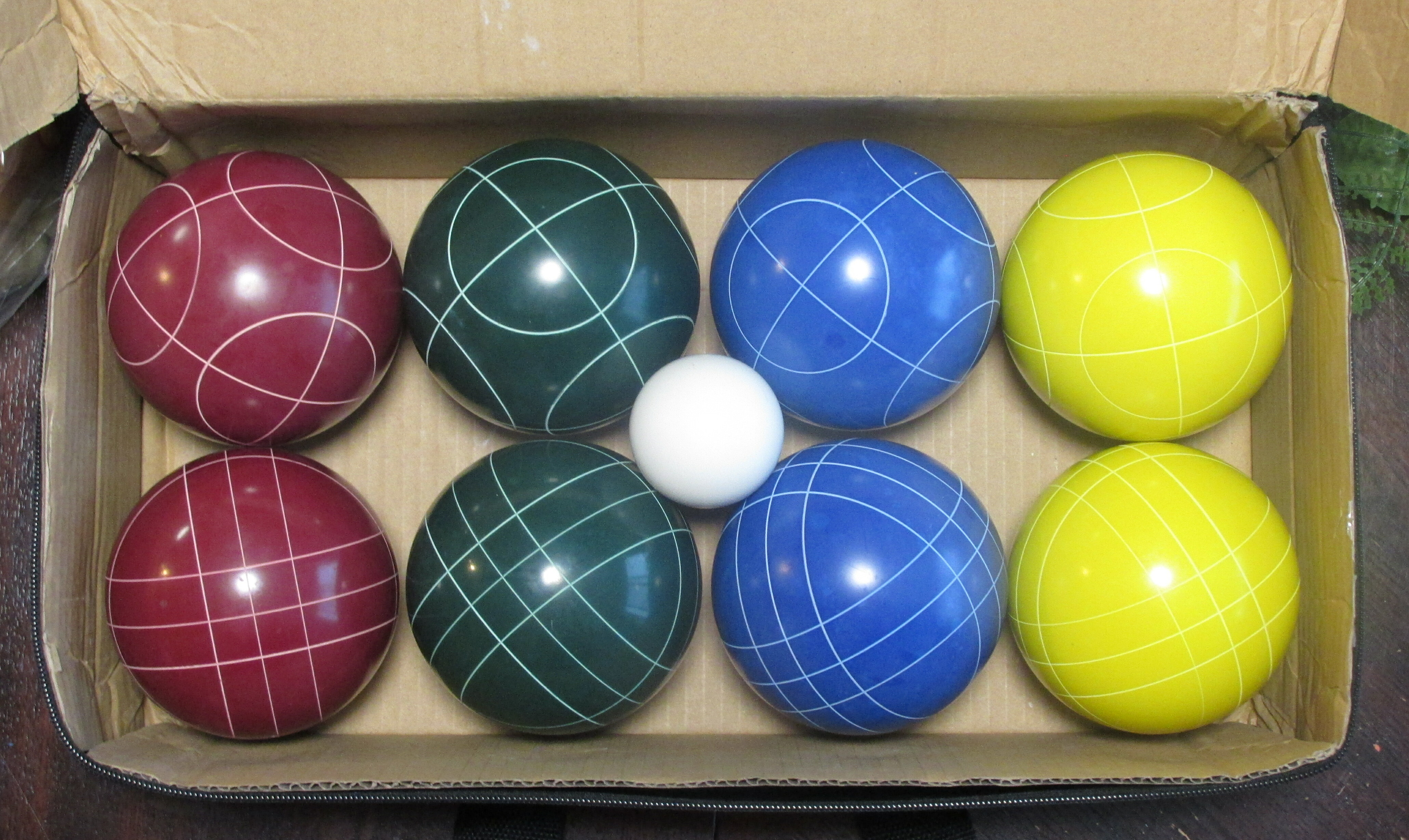
A typical bocce set

Bocce (/ˈbɒtʃi/, or /ˈbɒtʃeɪ/, Italian: [ˈbɔttʃe]), sometimes anglicized as bocce ball, bocci, or boccie, is a ball sport belonging to the boules family of games. Developed into its present form in Italy, it is closely related to English bowls and French pétanque, with a common ancestry from ancient games played in the Roman Empire. Bocce is played around Western, Southern, and Southeastern Europe, as well as in overseas areas with historical Italian immigrant population, including Australia, North and South America, principally Argentina and the southern Brazilian states of Paraná, Rio Grande do Sul and Santa Catarina. Initially only played by Italian immigrants, the game has slowly gained popularity among descendant generations and outside the Italian diaspora.

== History ==
Having developed from games played in the Roman Empire, bocce developed into its present form in Italy, where it is called bocce, the plural of the Italian word boccia which means 'bowl' in the general sporting sense. It spread around Europe and also in regions to which Italians have migrated. The first form of regulation was described in the book "Gioco delle bocchie" by Raffaele Bisteghi in 1753. In South America it is known as bochas, or bolas criollas ('Criollo balls') in Venezuela, and bocha in southern Brazil. The accessibility of bocce to people of all ages and abilities has seen it grow in popularity among Special Olympics programmes globally, and it is now the third most-played sport among Special Olympics athletes.

== Geographical spread ==
The sport is also very popular on the eastern side of the Adriatic, especially in Croatia, Serbia, Montenegro, and Bosnia and Herzegovina, where the sport is known in Serbo-Croatian as boćanje ('playing boće') or balote (colloquially also bućanje). In Slovenia the sport is known as balinanje or colloquially 'playing boče', or bale (from Italian bocce and Venetian bałe, meaning 'balls'). There are numerous bocce leagues in the United States (USA).

Bocce was brought to Venezuela between 1498 and 1510 by a Spanish friar or by Priest Sojo, great-uncle of Simón Bolívar. The Venezuelan modality became popular during the 1930s and is played in several Caribbean islands, including Aruba, Curaçao and Bonaire. In 1946, bocce was included in the first Venezuelan National Sports Games, and in 1956 the National Venezuelan Federation of Creole Bocce was founded.

Bocce is also played in Brazil. The sport was brought between 1880 and 1930 by the Italian families of Baggio, Zanetti, Tedesco, Merlin, Pazello, Bolisenha, Ricetti, Fressatos and Dorigos. The sport became popular on Curitiba and in 1952 the families created the bocci club Sociedade 25 de Maio. The city has also developed their own modality of bocce, "bocha clássico" (classic bocce). On 25 May, the city celebrates the bocce day.

Brazil is also notorious in the paralympic bocce modality. During the 2012 Summer Paralympics, the country conquered three gold medals and one bronze medal in the BC2 and BC4 categories. Brazil hosted the paralympic bocce world championship twice. On Rio 2016, Brazil conquered a gold medal and a silver medal in the BC3 and BC4 categories. On 2022, the World Championship was hosted again on Rio de Janeiro, and Brazil conquered one gold, three silver and three bronze medals. In 2025, Curitiba hosted the Youth Bocce World Cup.

In the United States, an active tournament circuit exists mainly among European-American clubs and community centers. In an interesting development for the growth of the sport on the continent, the first fully broadcast semi-professional North American bocce leagues were created in 2025.The sister leagues (the Ohio Bocce League in Youngstown, OH and the Chicago Bocce League in Chicago, IL) are broadcast live for free on the Bocce Broadcast Network YouTube channel.

== Bocce culture in Valdese, North Carolina ==
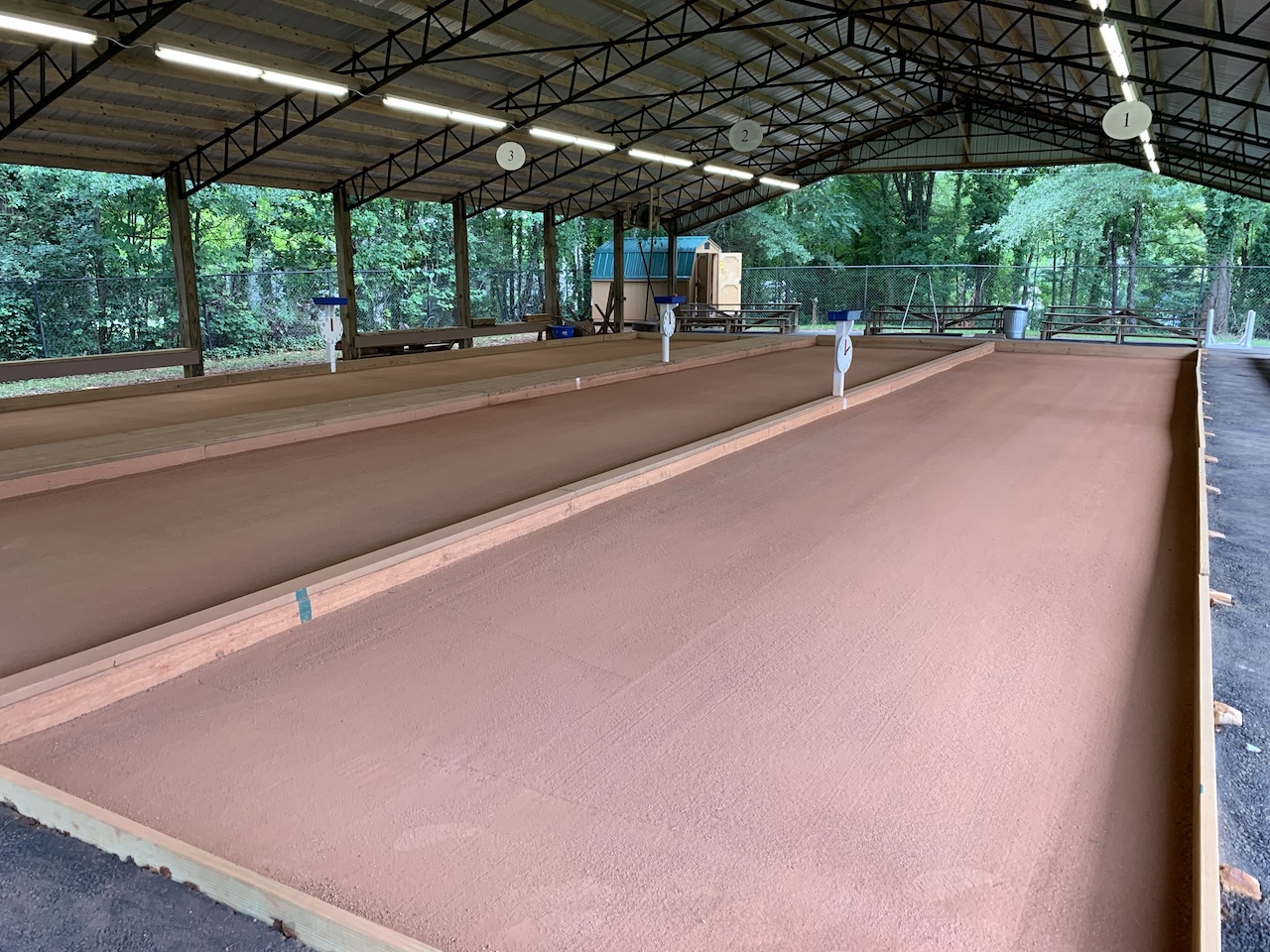
Covered bocce courts in Valdese, North Carolina

In Valdese, North Carolina, the sport was brought by Waldensian immigrants in 1893 and remains a cornerstone of local heritage. Le Phare des Alpes (LPDA)—a mutual aid society founded in 1909—operates a modern bocce complex featuring three covered, lighted clay courts, with tournament scoring managed by an electronic web-based system. The society hosts an annual regional bocce tournament in August as part of the Waldensian Festival, as well as an annual “State Bocce Tournament” each September, drawing teams from across North Carolina. The LPDA bocce courts are regarded by enthusiasts as “the finest bocce complex in North Carolina,” and Valdese is playfully referred to as “the bocce capital of the world.”

== Rules and play ==
Bocce is traditionally played on a natural soil or asphalt court up to 27.5 metres (90 ft) in length and 2.5 to 4 metres (8.2 to 13.1 ft) wide. While the court walls are traditionally made of wood or stone, many social leagues and Special Olympics programs now use inflatable 'Packabocce' PVC courts due to their portability and ease of storage. Bocce balls can be made of wood (traditional), metal, baked clay, or various kinds of plastic. Unlike lawn bowls, bocce balls are spherical and have no inbuilt bias.

A game can be conducted between two players, or two teams of two, three, or four. A match is started by a randomly chosen side being given the opportunity to throw a smaller ball, the jack (called a boccino ('little bocce') or pallino ('bullet' or 'little ball') in Italian, depending on local custom), from one end of the court into a zone 5 metres (16 ft) in length, ending 2.5 metres (8.2 ft) from the far end of the court. If the first team misses twice, the other team is awarded the opportunity to place the jack anywhere they choose within the prescribed zone. Casual play is common in reasonably flat areas of parks and yards lacking a bocce court, but players should agree to the minimum and maximum distance the jack may be thrown before play begins.

The side that first attempted to place the jack is given the opportunity to bowl first. Once the first bowl has taken place, the other side has the opportunity to bowl. From then on, the side which does not have the ball closest to the jack has a chance to bowl, up until one side or the other has used their four balls. At that point, the other side bowls its remaining balls. The object of the game is for a team to get as many of its balls as possible closer to the target ball (jack, boccino, pallino) than the opposing team. The team with the closest ball to the jack is the only team that can score points in any frame. The scoring team receives one point for each of their balls that is closer to the jack than the closest ball of the other team. The length of a game varies by region but is typically from 7 to 13 points.

Players are permitted to throw the ball in the air using an underarm action only. This is generally used to knock either the jack or another ball away to attain a more favorable position. Tactics can get quite complex when players have sufficient control over the ball to throw or roll it accurately.

== Variants ==
=== Punto raffa volo ===
Also known as PRV, punto raffa volo is the main international competition form of bocce. The name refers to the three legal types of throws in the game: punto, or lagging the ball toward the pallino; raffa, shooting a ball with an aerial throw that hits the ground and rolls toward the target; and volo, hitting a ball on the fly or a short hop. The rules of PRV are strict and reward precision and accuracy. Rules violations allow the opposing team to keep the result or reset the game to its setup before the rules violation (and pulling the foul ball off the court). This reset is accomplished by marking the ground with chalk to indicate the placement of each ball and the pallino.

Rules include (but are not limited to):

- When lagging a ball toward the target, the thrown ball may not move another ball or the pallino more than 70 cm (in Italy, some leagues enforce a 50 cm rule).
- When throwing a raffa or volo, the player must declare which ball will hit first.
- Players cannot throw a ball off the side walls.
- The back wall is dead for missed shots and any balls that hit the back wall while lagging (there are some variations of the lagging rule that may allow the pallino to be pushed into the back wall).

=== Open bocce ===
Played mainly in the U.S. and Canada, open bocce features a basic set of rules as compared with PRV. In open bocce, there are fewer limitations on lagging (side walls are live, balls can be moved any distance), and missed targets while shooting are allowed. Some clubs play with the back wall live, while other clubs play with the back wall as dead if a ball hits the back wall on the fly without striking a ball or the pallino. Other variations include angled corners and gutters at the end of the court rather than a back wall.

=== Bocce volo ===
A variation called bocce volo uses a metal ball, which is thrown overhand (palm down), after a run-up to the throwing line. In that latter respect, it is similar to the French boules game jeu provençal also known as boule lyonnaise which is internationally called sport-boules. Another French variant of the game is called pétanque, and (lacking the run-up) is more similar in some respects to traditional bocce.

=== Boccia ===
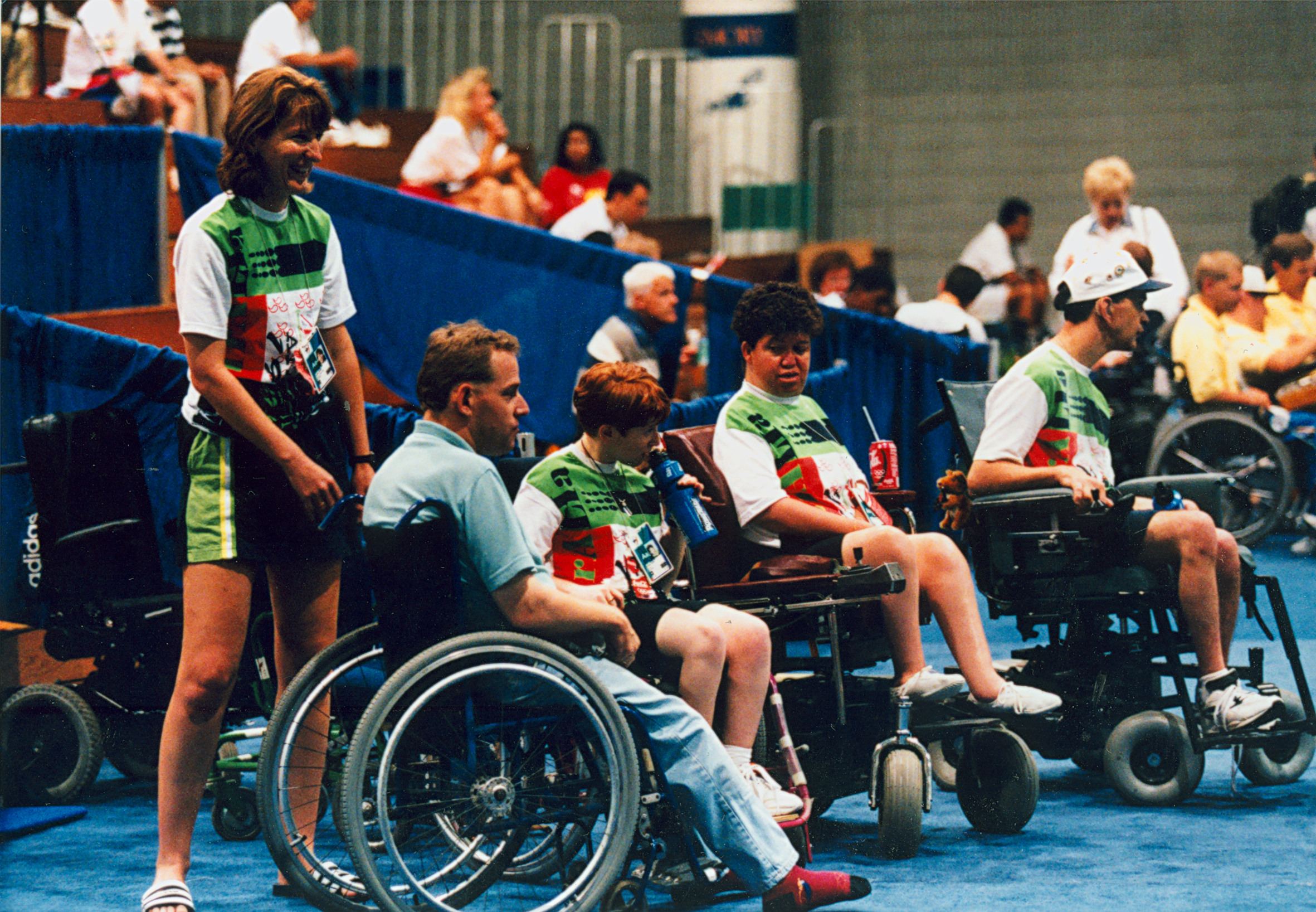
Australian boccia team members

Another development, for persons with disabilities, is called boccia. It is a shorter-range game, played with leather balls on an indoor, smooth surface. Boccia was first introduced to the Paralympics at the 1984 New York/Stoke Mandeville Summer Games and is one of the only two Paralympic sports that do not have an Olympic counterpart (the other being goalball).

=== Classic bocce ===
A Brazilian variety of bocce where the ball is rolled on the floor instead of thrown.

=== Creole bocce ===
A Venezuelan variety of bocce, where 4 red balls, 4 green balls and one 5 cm ball (called Mingo) are thrown at once in the field.

== See also ==
- Fédération Internationale de Boules
