= Bocce volo =

Boules-type game

Characteristics
- Contact: Non-contact
- Team members: Individual
- Type: Boules
- Equipment: Bocce (balls) and pallino (jack)

Presence
- Olympic: No
- World Games: Invitational 1997, 2001 – present

Bocce volo ("flying boules"), or boule lyonnaise ("Lyonnais boules"), is a boules-type game.

In bocce volo, the balls are thrown or rolled overhand (palm down) or underhand (palm up) and are metal. In non-standard bocce, the wooden or plastic balls are tossed underhand (palm up) and rolled.

Volo, as it is called for short by the Italians, derives its name from the Italian verb volare meaning 'to fly', and refers to the technique of throwing a ball through the air in an attempt to knock away an opponent's ball.

Bocce volo is similar to pétanque in that the ball is thrown or rolled depending on the player preference and game situation. It is different from pétanque in that the ball is delivered with a run-up, but only during the throw. During the roll, there is no run-up. A volo players' run-up is athletic, even theatrical, as in jeu provençal.

== See also ==
- Fédération Internationale de Boules
