= 2007 Indoor Cricket World Cup =

Cricket event

- Logo of the 2007 Indoor Cricket World Cup
- Administrator: World Indoor Cricket Federation
- Cricket format: Indoor Cricket
- Tournament format(s): Round-robin and Knockout
- Host: England
- Champions: Australia (men); Australia (women)
- Participants: 7 (men); 5 (women)
- Matches: 35 (men); 20 (women)

The 2007 Indoor Cricket World Cup was an Indoor Cricket tournament that took place in Bristol, England from 22 to 29 September 2007 involving both a men's and a women's division. There were a total of 35 matches played in the men's division and 26 matches played in the women's division.

The men's division was split into two stages (in addition to finals) with each team playing each other once before being split into two groups, the top four and the bottom three. The top four teams progressed to a Super 4's stage where they again played each other once in order to be ranked for the semi-finals. The semi finals featured Australia, England, New Zealand and South Africa with Australia defeating South Africa in the final to record their sixth consecutive World Cup. The top three teams contested a subsidiary title, won by England.

Whilst the women's division was not split into separate stages it did employ a more complicated semi final system that gave all five nations the opportunity of progressing through to the final during the finals stage. South Africa advanced straight through to the final after defeating Australia in the semi-finals stage, though Australia then prevailed over New Zealand and were able to reverse their semi final result to defeat South Africa in the final. This was the fifth consecutive World Cup for Australia.

The 2007 Junior World Series of Indoor Cricket was held alongside this event.

== Host Selection ==
The World Cup was awarded to England by the WICF at the conclusion of the previous World Cup. As a result, England became the first nation to host the World Cup twice having held the first tournament in 1995.

=== Venue ===
The England Indoor Cricket Association determined that the Action Indoor Sports Stadium in Bristol would host all World Cup matches and Bristol became the host city as a result. All World Cup matches were played at the same venue.

== Participants ==
Men's Division

- Australia
- England
- France
- Guernsey
- New Zealand
- Pakistan
- South Africa

India were also initially entered in the men's division but were late withdrawals from the competition.

Women's Division

- Australia
- England
- New Zealand
- South Africa
- Wales

== Round Robin tournament ==
Men's Division

22 September 2007

New Zealand; 90	v	England; 85

New Zealand won by 5 runs

22 September 2007

South Africa; 203	v	Guernsey -91

South Africa won by 304 runs

22 September 2007

Australia; 211	v	France -101

Australia won by 312 runs

22 September 2007

France; 0	v	Pakistan; 0

France won on forfeit

- The Pakistan team arrived late to the tournament and were unable to field a team for this match. It was initially rescheduled and later awarded to France

22 September 2007

South Africa; 97	v	England -31

South Africa won by 128 runs

22 September 2007

New Zealand; 193	v	Guernsey; 0

New Zealand won by 193 runs

23 September 2007

England; 109	v	Guernsey -5

England won by 114 runs

23 September 2007

Australia; 82	v	New Zealand; 77

Australia won by 5 runs

23 September 2007

South Africa; 0	v	Pakistan; 0

South Africa won on forfeit

- The Pakistan team arrived late to the tournament and were unable to field a team for this match. It was initially rescheduled and later awarded to South Africa

23 September 2007

New Zealand; 181	v	France; 30

New Zealand won by 151 runs

23 September 2007

England; 0	v	Pakistan; 0

England won on forfeit

- The Pakistan team arrived late to the tournament and were unable to field a team for this match. It was initially rescheduled and later awarded to England

23 September 2007

Australia; 123	v	South Africa; 40

Australia won by 83 runs

24 September 2007

England; 72	v	Australia; 62

England won by 10 runs

24 September 2007

South Africa; 173	v	France -11

South Africa won by 184 runs

24 September 2007

Guernsey; 165	v	Pakistan; 13

Guernsey won by 152 runs

24 September 2007

New Zealand; 110	v	South Africa; 35

England won by 75 runs

24 September 2007

Australia; 195	v	Guernsey -33

Australia won by 228 runs

24 September 2007

England; 230	v	France; 0

England won by 230 runs

25 September 2007

Pakistan; 0	v	New Zealand; 0

Pakistan won on forfeit

- New Zealand forfeited this match

25 September 2007

Pakistan; 0	v	Australia; 0

Pakistan won on forfeit

- Australia won this match but were found to have played an ineligible player. The match was therefore awarded to Pakistan.

25 September 2007

Guernsey; 76	v	France; 30

Guernsey won by 46 runs

Women's Division

22 September 2007

Australia; 183	v	England; 3

Australia won by 180 runs

22 September 2007

South Africa; 178	v	Wales -33

South Africa won by 211 runs

22 September 2007

Australia; 193	v	Wales -45

Australia won by 238 runs

22 September 2007

New Zealand; 132	v	England; 14

New Zealand won by 118 runs

23 September 2007

New Zealand; 194	v	Wales; 42

New Zealand won by 152

23 September 2007

South Africa; 131	v	Australia; 115

South Africa won by 16 runs

23 September 2007

England; 83	v	Wales; 80

England won by 3 runs

23 September 2007

South Africa; 161	v	New Zealand; 108

South Africa won by 53 runs

24 September 2007

South Africa; 201	v	England; 58

South Africa won by 143 runs

24 September 2007

Australia; 157	v	New Zealand; 72

Australia won by 85 runs

24 September 2007

Australia; 179	v	England; 31

Australia won by 148 runs

24 September 2007

South Africa; 194	v	Wales; 35

South Africa won by 159 runs

25 September 2007

Australia; 228	v	Wales -19

Australia won by 247 runs

25 September 2007

New Zealand; 171	v	England; 35

New Zealand won by 136 runs

26 September 2007

New Zealand; 198	v	Wales; 61

New Zealand won by 137 runs

26 September 2007

South Africa; 103	v	Australia; 87

South Africa won by 16 runs

26 September 2007

South Africa; 119	v	New Zealand; 65

South Africa won by 54 runs

26 September 2007

Wales; 116	v	England; 88

Wales won by 28 runs

27 September 2007

Australia; 130	v	New Zealand; 111

Australia won by 19 runs

27 September 2007

South Africa; 192	v	England; 17

South Africa won by 175 runs

== Super 4's Stage ==
The top four teams at the conclusion of the round robin series progressed through to the Super 4 stage of the tournament. The bottom three teams were relegated to the World Cup Plate division and, together with the team that finished 4th after the Super 4's stage, competed for a separate subordinate trophy.

Men's Division – Top Four

25 September 2007

South Africa; 109	v	New Zealand; 33

South Africa won by 76 runs

25 September 2007

Australia; 106	v	England; 41

Australia won by 65 runs

26 September 2007

New Zealand; 112	v	England; 94

New Zealand won by 18 runs

26 September 2007

Australia; 82	v	South Africa; 64

Australia won by 18 runs

27 September 2007

South Africa; 80	v	England; 65

South Africa won by 15 runs

27 September 2007

Australia; 99	v	New Zealand; 56

Australia won by 43 runs

Men's Division – Bottom Three

26 September 2007

Pakistan; 107	v	Guernsey; 30

Pakistan won by 37 runs

26 September 2007

France; 107	v	Pakistan; 30

France won by 77 runs

27 September 2007

France; 74	v	Guernsey; 61

France won by 13 runs

Women's Division

There was no Super 4's stage in the women's division.

== Semi finals ==
The World Cup finals operated under a different format in each division. In the men's division the winner of the two semi finals proceeded to the final and the remaining two teams competed for the bronze medal match.

The World Cup Plate final was contested between the loser of the bronze medal match and the highest ranked team from the bottom three during the Super 4's stage.

The women's division employed a slightly more complicated format. The fourth and fifth placed teams faced off against one another with the winner taking on third place to earn a right in the preliminary final. The top two teams competed in a major semi final with the winner progressing to the final and the loser taking the second spot in the preliminary final. The remaining spot in the World Cup final was assumed by the winner of the preliminary final.

Men's Division

Semi-final 1 (1st vs 4th) – winner to final, loser to bronze medal match

28 September 2007

Australia; 163	v	England; 51

Australia won by 112 runs

Semi-final 2 (2nd vs 3rd) – winner to final, loser to bronze medal match

28 September 2007

South Africa; 87	v	New Zealand; 84

South Africa won by 3 runs

Bronze Medal Match – winner receives bronze medal, loser to World Cup Plate final

28 September 2007

New Zealand; 106	v	England; 1

New Zealand won by 105 runs

Women's Division

Major Semi-final (1st vs 2nd) – winner to final, loser to preliminary final

27 September 2007

South Africa; 127	v	Australia; 97

South Africa won by 30 runs

Qualifying Final (3rd vs 5th) – winner to minor semi final, loser knocked out

28 September 2007

England; 84	v	Wales; 80

England won by 4 runs

Minor Semi-final – winner to preliminary final, loser knocked out

28 September 2007

New Zealand; 210	v	England; 63

New Zealand won by 147 runs

Preliminary Final – winner to final, loser knocked out

28 September 2007

Australia; 131	v	New Zealand; 42

Australia won by 89 runs

== Finals ==
Men's Division

World Cup
The World Cup final was contested between Australia and South Africa. This final was the sixth consecutive appearance in a World Cup final and was the first for South Africa. Despite performing below expectations early in the tournament, Australia easily accounted for England in their semi final. The South African team, on the other hand, came through a tough encounter with the New Zealand team by just three runs.

In the end, Australia managed a narrow but comfortable victory to claim their sixth consecutive title.

29 September 2007

Australia; 74	v	South Africa; 51

Australia won by 23 runs

World Cup Plate
A secondary and subordinate final was played between England (the loser of the bronze medal match) and France (the highest ranked team from the bottom three teams). England rebounded from their heavy loss against New Zealand in the bronze medal match to claim the first Plate title.

29 September 2007

England; 101	v	France; 21

England won by 80 runs

Women's Division The Women's World Cup Final featured Australia and South Africa. South Africa entered the team as favourites having accounted for Australia in all but one of their encounters in the earlier stages of the World Cup. Australia, however, rebounded and managed to claim their fifth consecutive World Cup title.

29 September 2007

Australia; 138	v	South Africa; 39

Australia won by 49 runs

== Player of the tournament ==
Nineteen year old Lee Irwin of Australia was awarded player of the tournament.

== See also ==
- Indoor Cricket World Cup
- 2007 Junior World Series of Indoor Cricket
