= 2002 Indoor Cricket World Cup =

Cricket event

- Logo of the 2004 Indoor Cricket World Cup
- Administrator: World Indoor Cricket Federation
- Cricket format: Indoor Cricket
- Tournament format(s): Round-robin and Knockout
- Host: New Zealand
- Champions: Australia (men); Australia (women)
- Participants: 5 (men); 4 (women)
- Matches: 31

The 2002 Indoor Cricket World Cup was an indoor cricket tournament that took place in Wellington, New Zealand from 30 September to 6 October 2002 involving both a men's and a women's division. There were a total of 17 matches played in the men's division and 14 matches played in the women's division.

In the men's division a round robin tournament was played with each team playing the other once in order to rank the sides. All five teams then competed in the finals, with Australia eventually defeating New Zealand in the final itself. This win represented their 4th World Cup title in succession and was despite losing their first ever World Cup game to New Zealand in the major semi final. The women's division also featured a round robin tournament, though each of the four sides played each other twice. At the conclusion of the round robin games, the highest ranked side (in this case, Australia) progressed through to the final leaving 2nd and 3rd place (New Zealand and Sri Lanka) to contest the semi-final. Australia defeated New Zealand in the final, claiming their 3rd World Cup title in succession.

The event was marred by the late withdrawal of South Africa from both divisions, a decision that would have significant repercussions for the South African national body.

== Host Selection ==
The World Cup was awarded to New Zealand by the WICF at the conclusion of the previous World Cup. This was the first time the event had been held in New Zealand.

=== Venue ===
New Zealand Indoor Sports opted to stage the event at the Wellington Indoor Sports arena in Wellington.

== Participants ==
Men's Division

- Australia
- England
- India
- New Zealand
- Sri Lanka

Women's Division

- Australia
- New Zealand
- Sri Lanka
- India

== See also ==
- Indoor Cricket World Cup
