= 2004 Indoor Cricket World Cup =

Tournament held in Colombo, Sri Lanka

- Logo and mascot of the 2004 Indoor Cricket World Cup
- Administrator: World Indoor Cricket Federation
- Cricket format: Indoor Cricket
- Tournament format(s): Round-robin and Knockout
- Host: Sri Lanka
- Champions: Australia (men); Australia (women)
- Participants: 7 (men); 6 (women)
- Matches: 44

The 2004 Indoor Cricket World Cup was an Indoor Cricket tournament that took place in Colombo, Sri Lanka from 10 to 16 October 2004 involving both a men's and a women's division. There were a total of 25 matches played in the men's division and 19 matches played in the women's division.

In both divisions a round robin tournament was played with each team playing the other once after which the top four ranked sides progressed through to the semi-finals. Australia, New Zealand, Sri Lanka and South Africa contested the men's finals with Australia eventually defeating Sri Lanka in the final itself. The same four sides featured in the women's semi finals (though in a different order), with Australia prevailing over South Africa in the final. This represented the 5th consecutive title for Australia in the men's division and the 4th in the women's division.

== Host Selection ==
The World Cup was awarded to Sri Lanka by the WICF at the conclusion of the previous World Cup. This was the first time the event had been held in Sri Lanka and was seen as an important step towards expanding the game outside of the originating nations.

=== Venue ===
The Ceylon Indoor Cricket Association operated out of a single facility in Colombo, the Austasia Sports Complex. As the only functional indoor cricket facility in Sri Lanka this venue hosted all World Cup matches.

== Participants ==
Men's Division

- Australia (winners)
- England
- India
- New Zealand
- South Africa
- Sri Lanka
- United Arab Emirates

Women's Division

- Australia (winners)
- England
- India
- New Zealand
- South Africa
- Sri Lanka

== See also ==
- Indoor Cricket World Cup
