= Southampton Evening Cricket League =

Long established English Cricket League

The Southampton Evening Cricket League, formed in 1931, is one of the oldest cricket leagues in the United Kingdom. The current format of the league consists of three divisions of six to eight teams, playing each other once at "home" and once "away". Matches were played in a timed format until 1949 but are now scheduled to start at 6.30 pm, and are limited to sixteen overs per side, with no bowler permitted to bowl more than four overs. The evening format means that matches may be played during the week after work; many teams represent workplaces in and around the city of Southampton.

The league is won by the team with the highest average points total, rather than overall points or wins, given the nature of the team composition, availability of pitches and the great British weather means that not all fixtures can be fulfilled.

Matches are played at various sites around the city, including Southampton Sports Centre, Riverside Park & Millbrook. As of 30 May 2012, matches have been temporarily moved away from the league's most famous venue - Hoglands Park.

There are also 2 Cup competitions - the Presidents Cup and the Harold Diaper Trophy. An indoor league also runs during the winter months, although not all teams play in both versions of the league.

== Famous players ==
Several notable Test and county cricketers have played in the league, including Robin Smith, Kevin Shine, Gary Brent and Adrian Aymes.

Other famous players in the league include footballers Matt Le Tissier, Kevin Keegan, Ted Drake, Ted Bates & Jason Dodd.
