= Down and up =

The down-up is a commonly played stroke in indoor cricket. The successfully played down-up prevents any front court fielders from fielding the ball, meaning that bonus runs are scored.

== Technique ==
An indoor cricketer in stance ready to play a down-up.

The down-up is played by hitting the ball at the latest possible moment. This causes the ball to bounce sharply off the ground, ideally propelling the ball into the top corner of the net, preventing any fielders from making contact with the ball. This technique varies from outdoor cricket, where a batsman plays the ball in front of the body, hitting the ball for power and distance, rather than to hit the ball into the ground. The down-up is typically played as a forward attacking shot, in which the batsman steps forward with his front foot to hit the ball. The stroke is most commonly used to play full-pitched balls slightly outside off-stump, on the stumps, or slightly outside leg-stump. The leg-side down-up is the hardest to play, as it requires the batsman to play in front of his legs. Down-ups can also be played off the back foot for shorter pitched deliveries.

== Variations ==
Many indoor cricket strokes are played late in the trajectory of a delivery. Following is a list of other strokes that use the same technique of down-ups.

Cut Shot

The indoor cricket cut shot is an attacking stroke played to balls pitched short and outside off-stump. The aim is to hit the ball late and into the ground, with the ball ideally hitting the top corner of Zone B on the off side (See Indoor cricket court). The stroke is played with the bat horizontal to pitch (cross-bat), and is hit when the ball is directly in line with the body.

Pull Shot

The indoor cricket pull shot is an attacking stroke played to deliveries pitched short and on or outside leg/middle stump. The shot is played with the aim of hitting the ball into the top corner of Zone B on the leg side. The pull shot is usually played off the front foot, with the bat horizontal to pitch and the toe of the bat facing towards the bowler. The bat is swung in a downward motion, hitting the ball in front of the body.
