= Arena =

Large enclosed venue

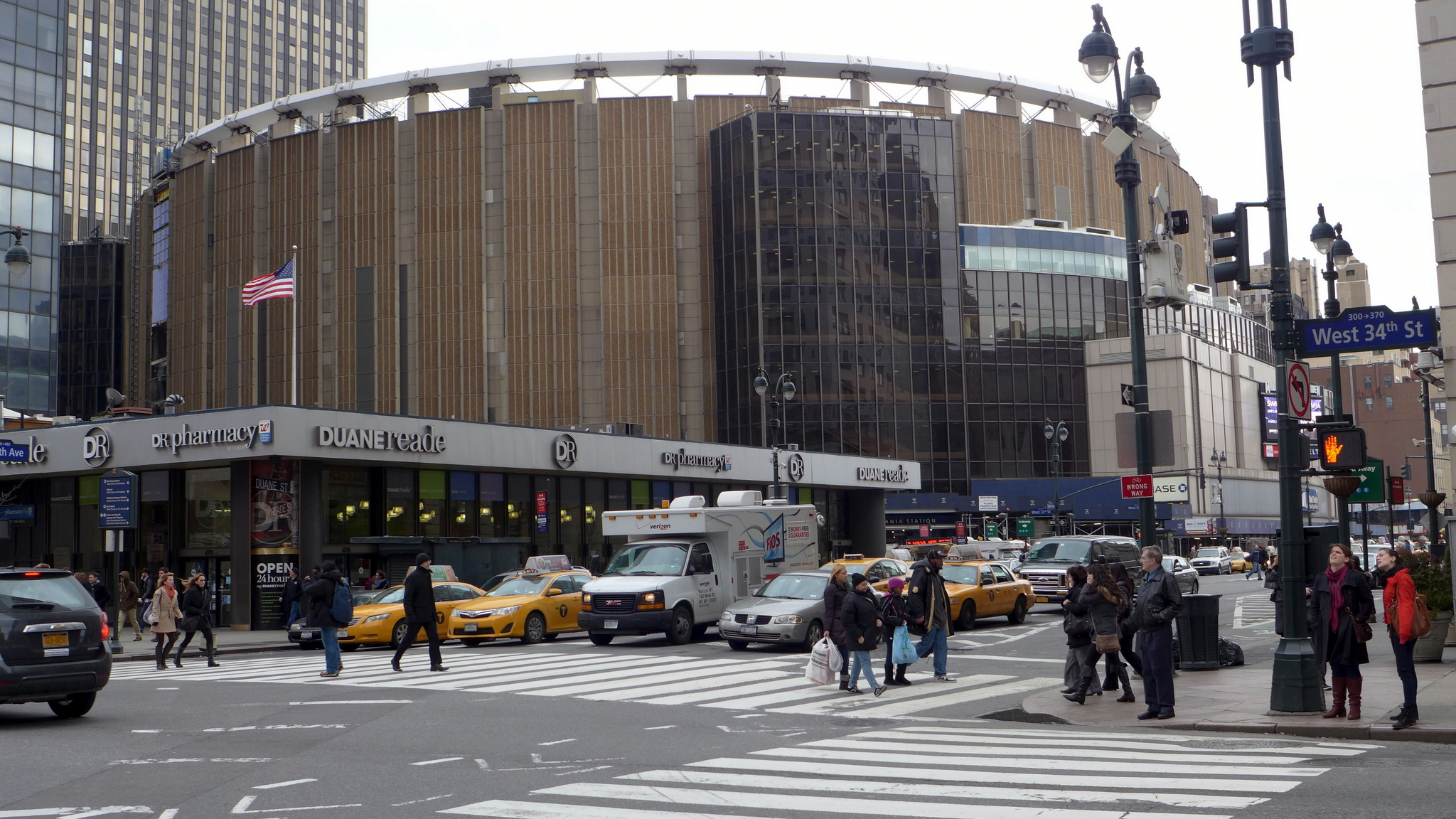
Madison Square Garden, an indoor arena in New York City.

An arena is a large enclosed venue, often circular or oval-shaped, designed to showcase theatre, musical performances, or sporting events. It comprises a large open space surrounded on most or all sides by tiered seating for spectators, and may be covered by a roof. The key feature of an arena is that the event space is the lowest point, allowing maximum visibility. Arenas are usually designed to accommodate a multitude of spectators.

== Background ==
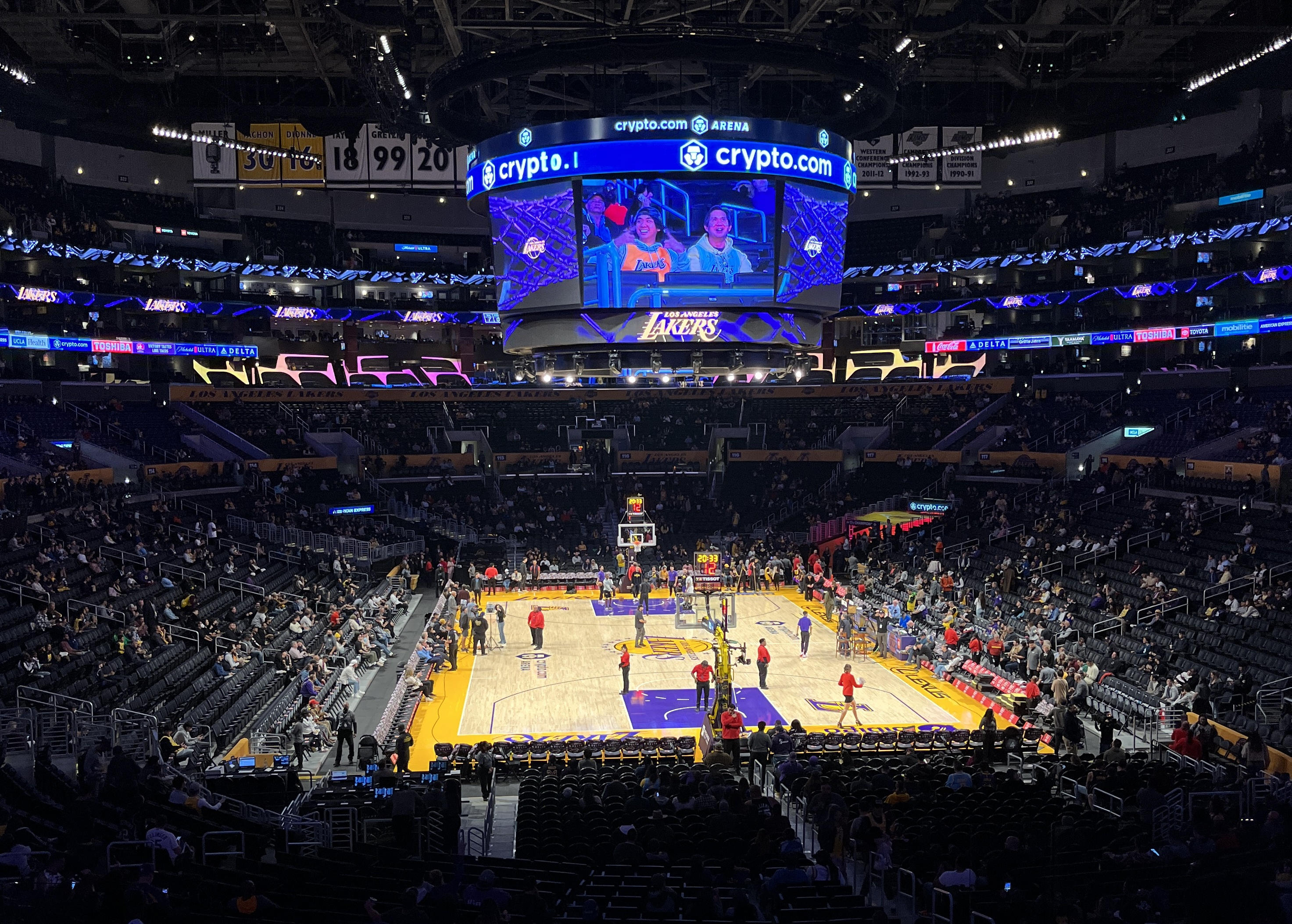
Interior of Crypto.com Arena.

The word derives from Latin harena, a particularly fine-grained sand that covered the floor of ancient arenas such as the Colosseum in Rome, Italy, to absorb blood.

The term arena is sometimes used as a synonym for a very large venue such as Pasadena's Rose Bowl, but such a facility is typically called a stadium. The use of one term over the other has mostly to do with the type of event. Football (be it association, rugby, gridiron, Australian rules, or Gaelic) is typically played in a stadium, while basketball, volleyball, handball, and ice hockey are typically played in an arena, although many of the larger arenas hold more spectators than do the stadiums of smaller colleges or high schools. There are exceptions. The home of the Duke University men's and women's basketball teams would qualify as an arena, but the facility is called Cameron Indoor Stadium. Domed stadiums, which, like arenas, are enclosed but have the larger playing surfaces and seating capacities found in stadiums, are generally not referred to as arenas in North America. There is also the sport of indoor American football (one variant of which is explicitly known as arena football), a variant of the outdoor game that is designed for the usual smaller playing surface of most arenas; variants of other traditionally outdoor sports, including box lacrosse as well as futsal and indoor soccer, also exist.

The term "arena" is also used loosely to refer to any event or type of event which either literally or metaphorically takes place in such a location, often with the specific intent of comparing an idea to a sporting event. Such examples of these would be terms such as "the arena of war", "the arena of love" or "the political arena".

== Gallery ==
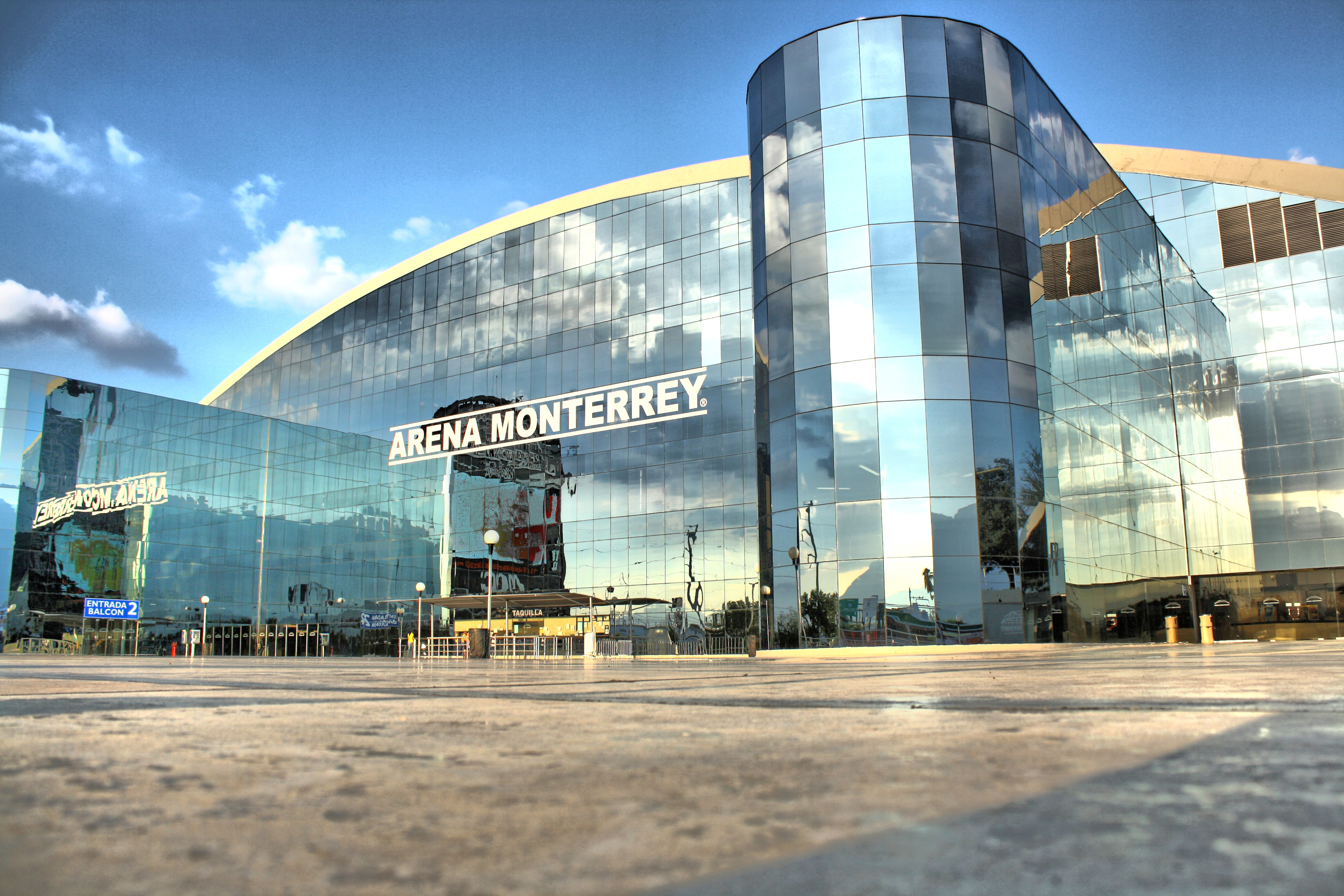
Arena Monterrey (Monterrey, Mexico)

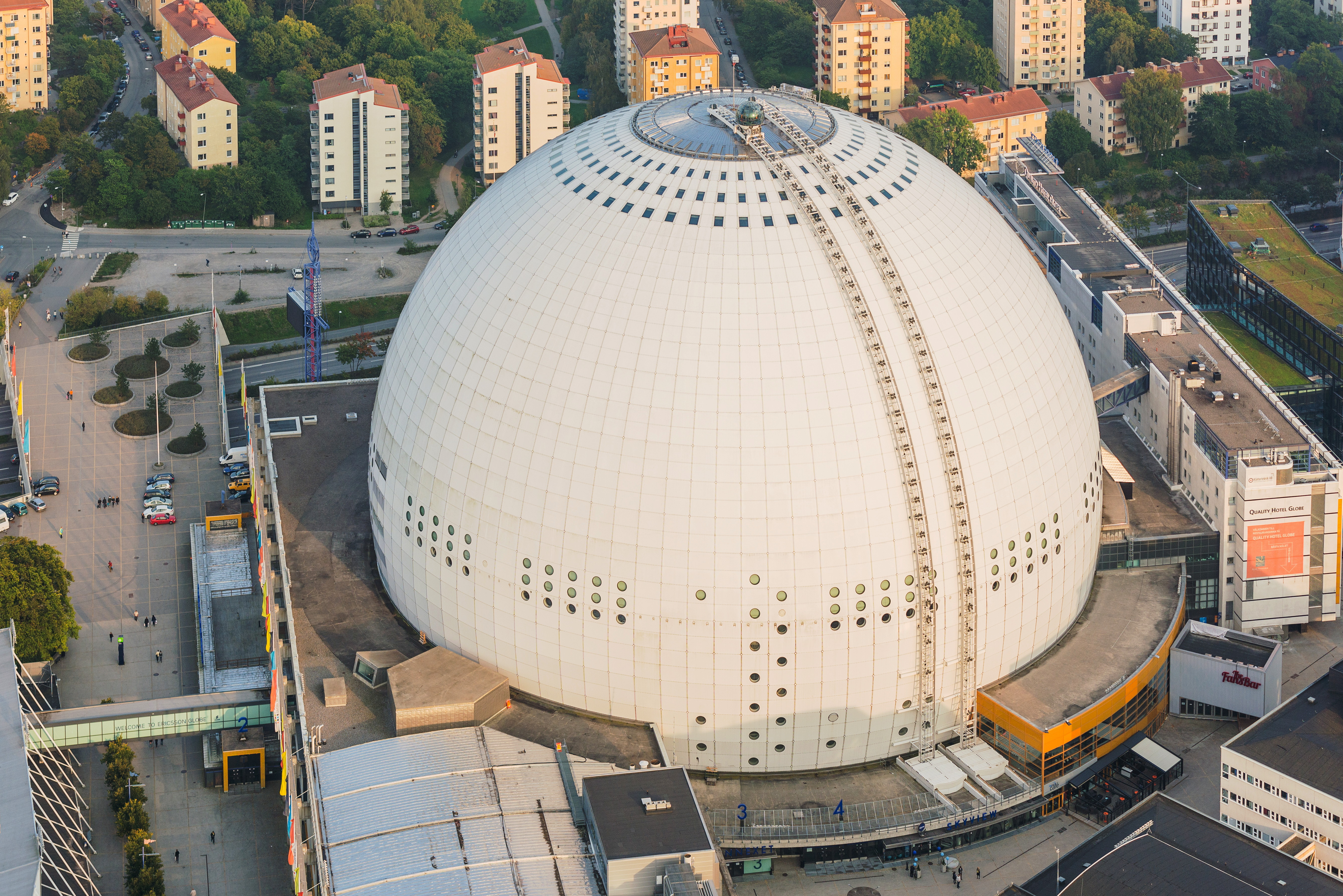
Avicii Arena (Stockholm, Sweden)

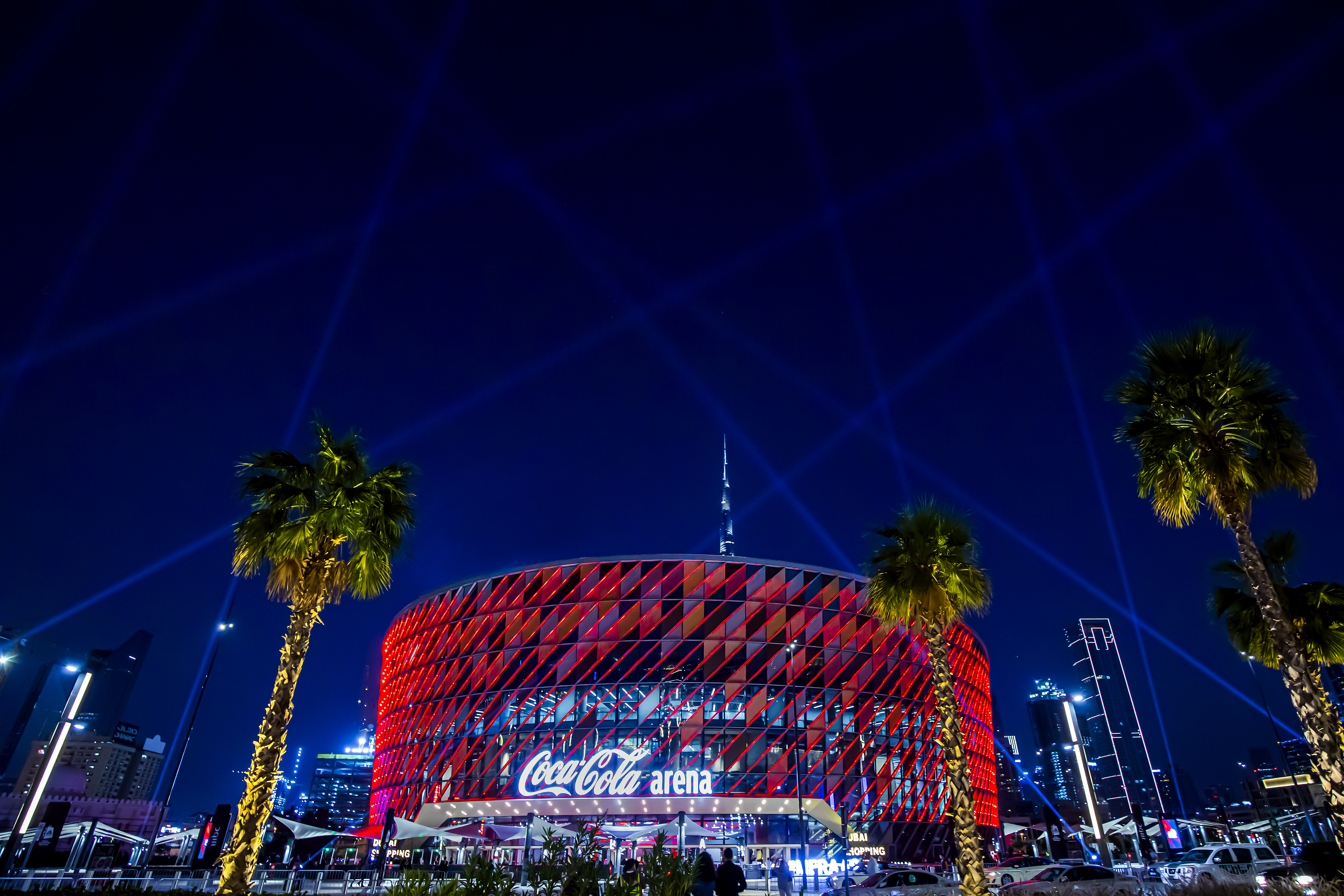
Coca-Cola Arena (Dubai, United Arab Emirates)

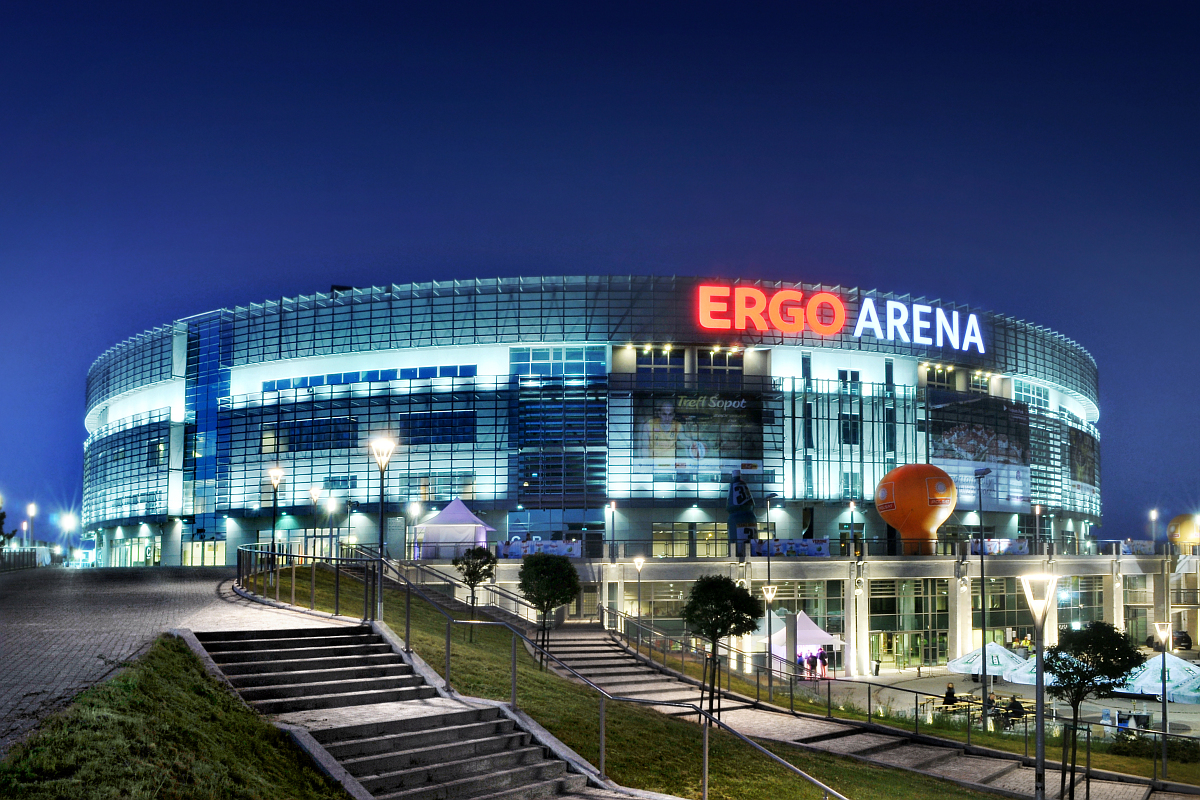
Ergo Arena (Gdańsk, Poland)

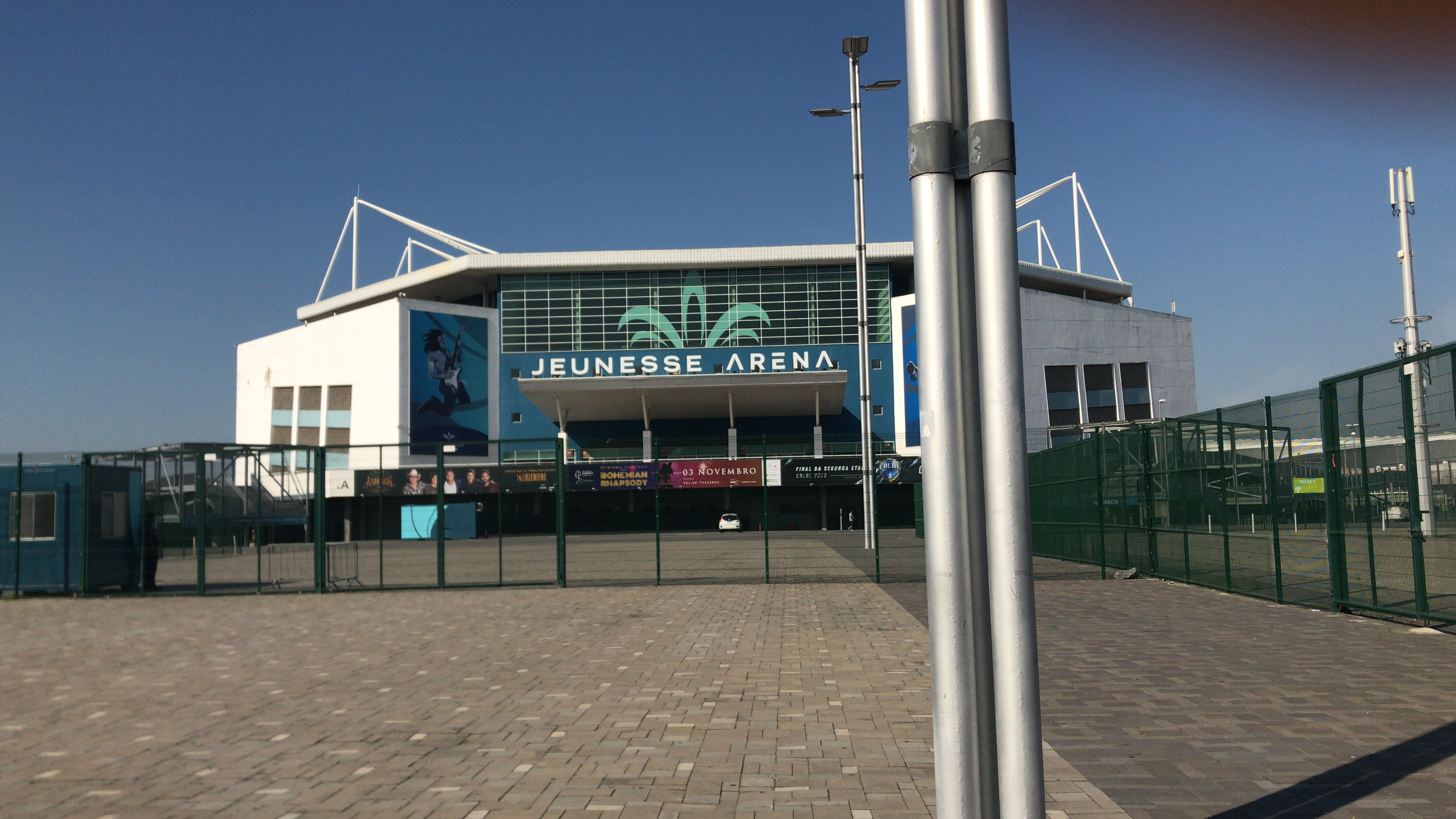
Farmasi Arena (Rio de Janeiro, Brazil)

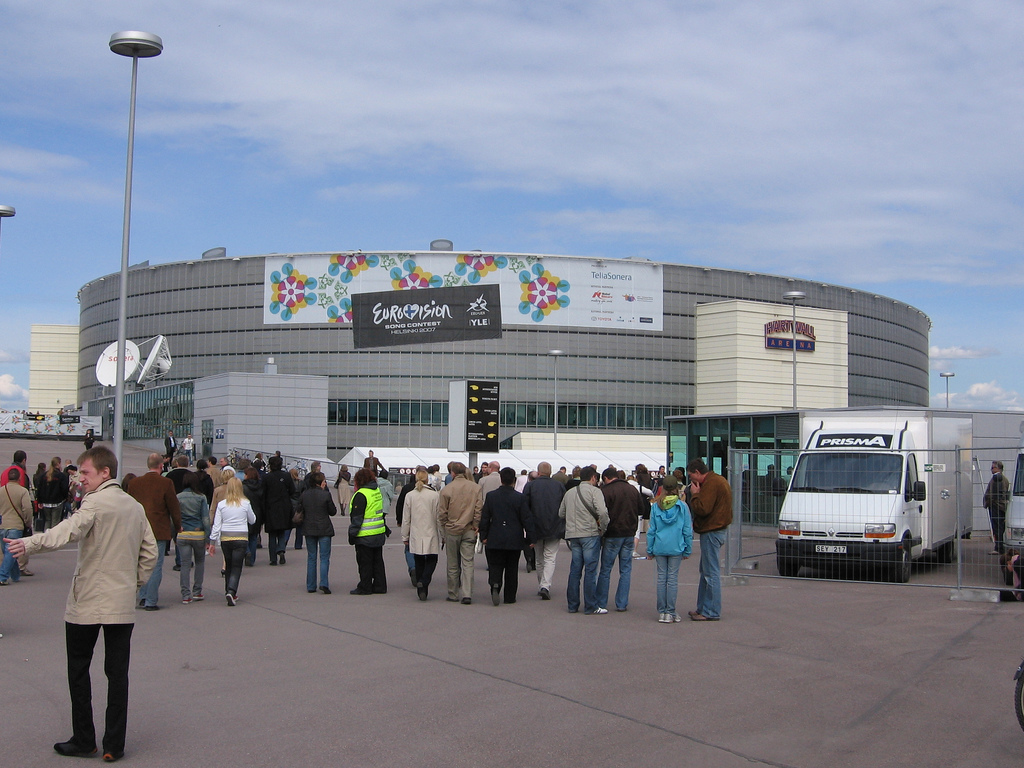
Helsinki Halli (Helsinki, Finland)

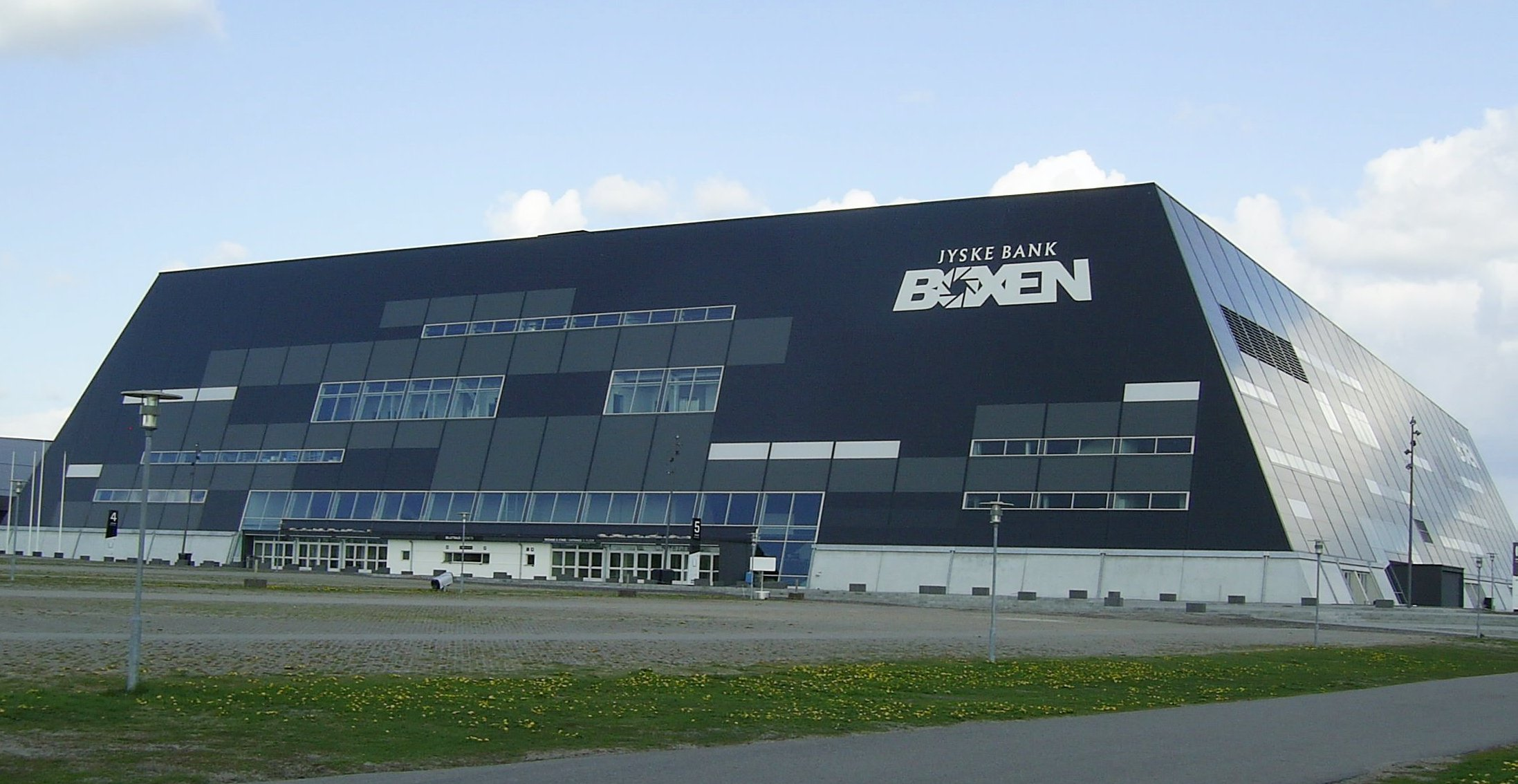
Jyske Bank Boxen (Herning, Denmark)

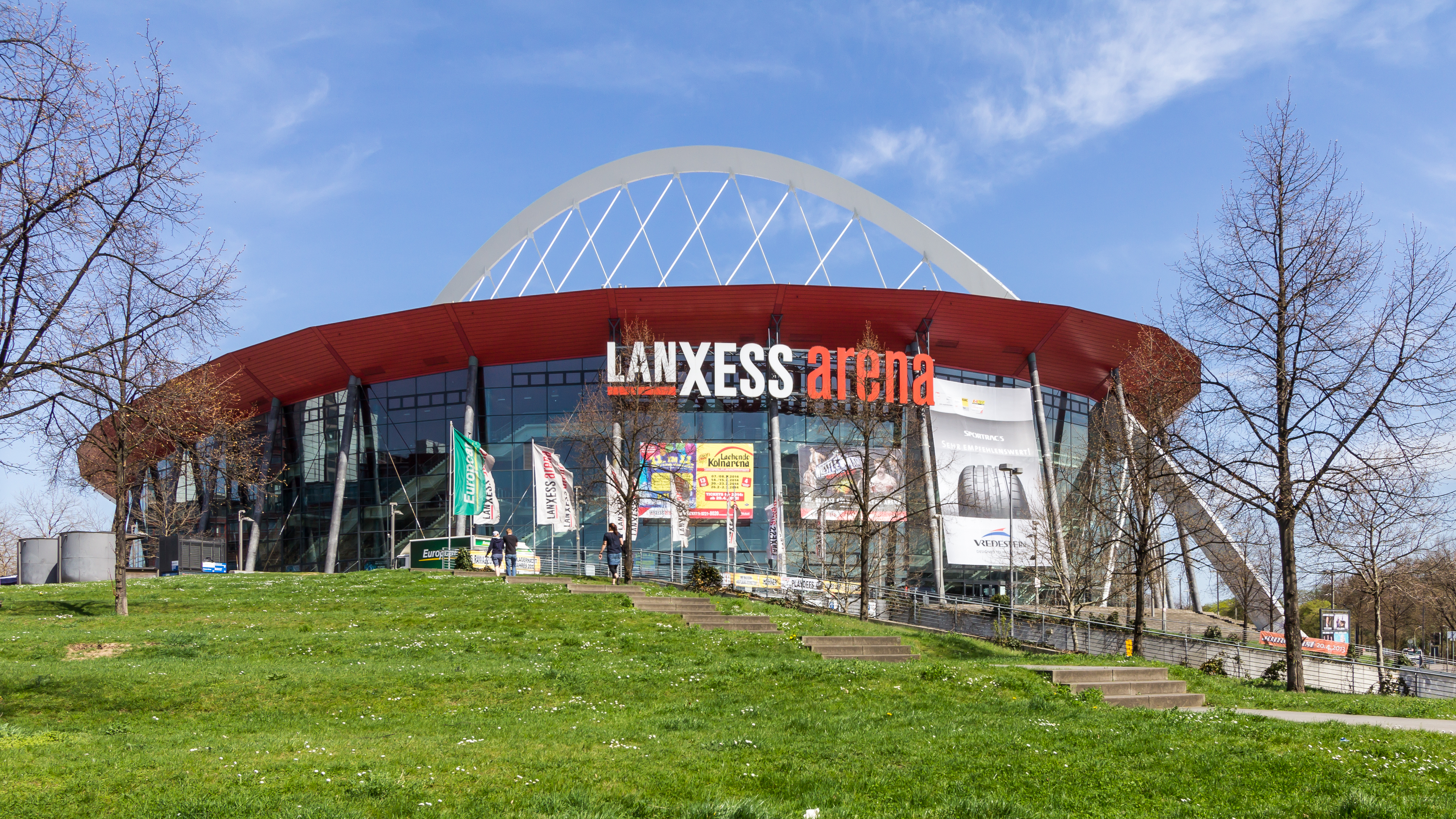
Lanxess Arena (Cologne, Germany)

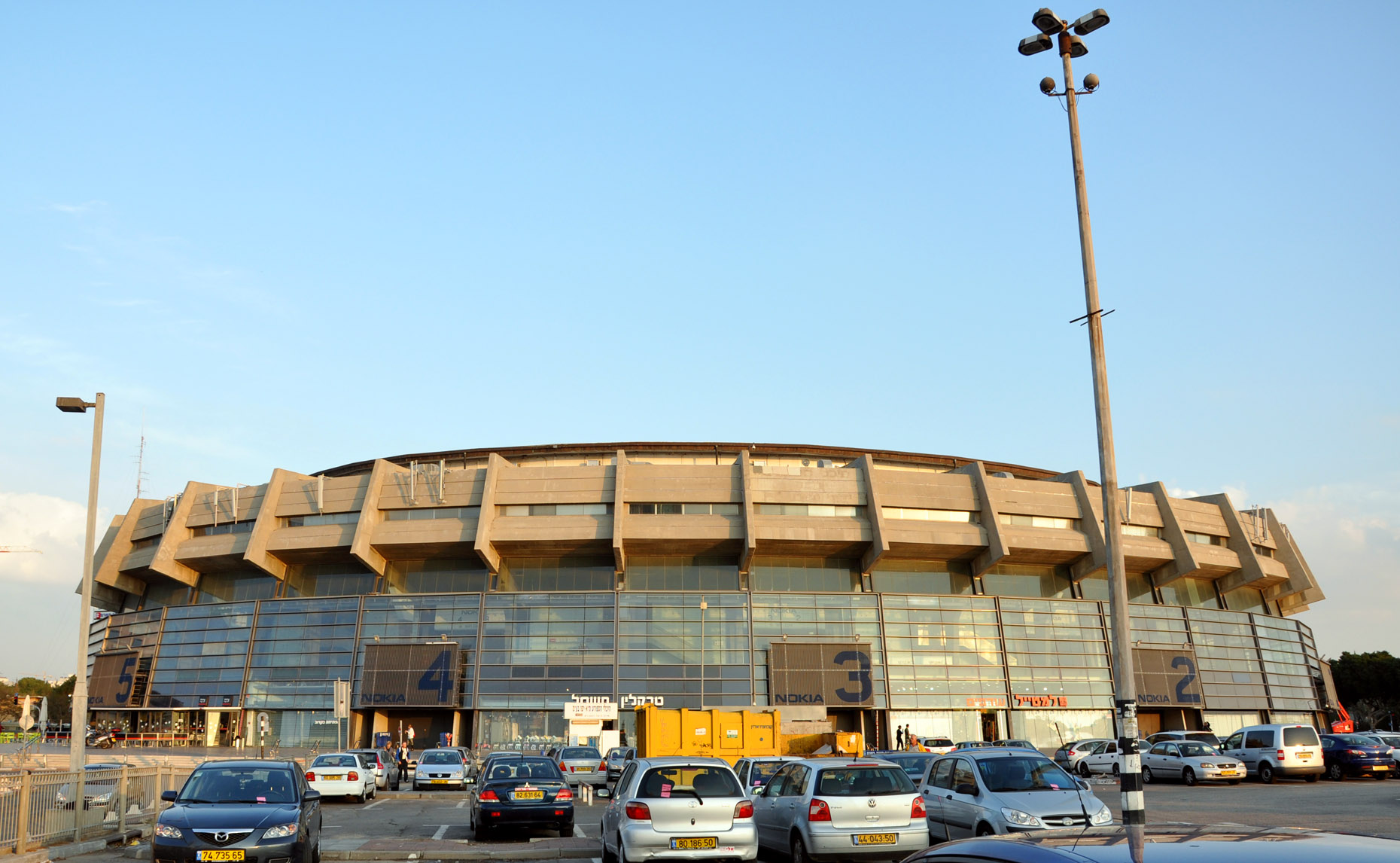
Menora Mivtachim Arena (Tel Aviv, Israel)

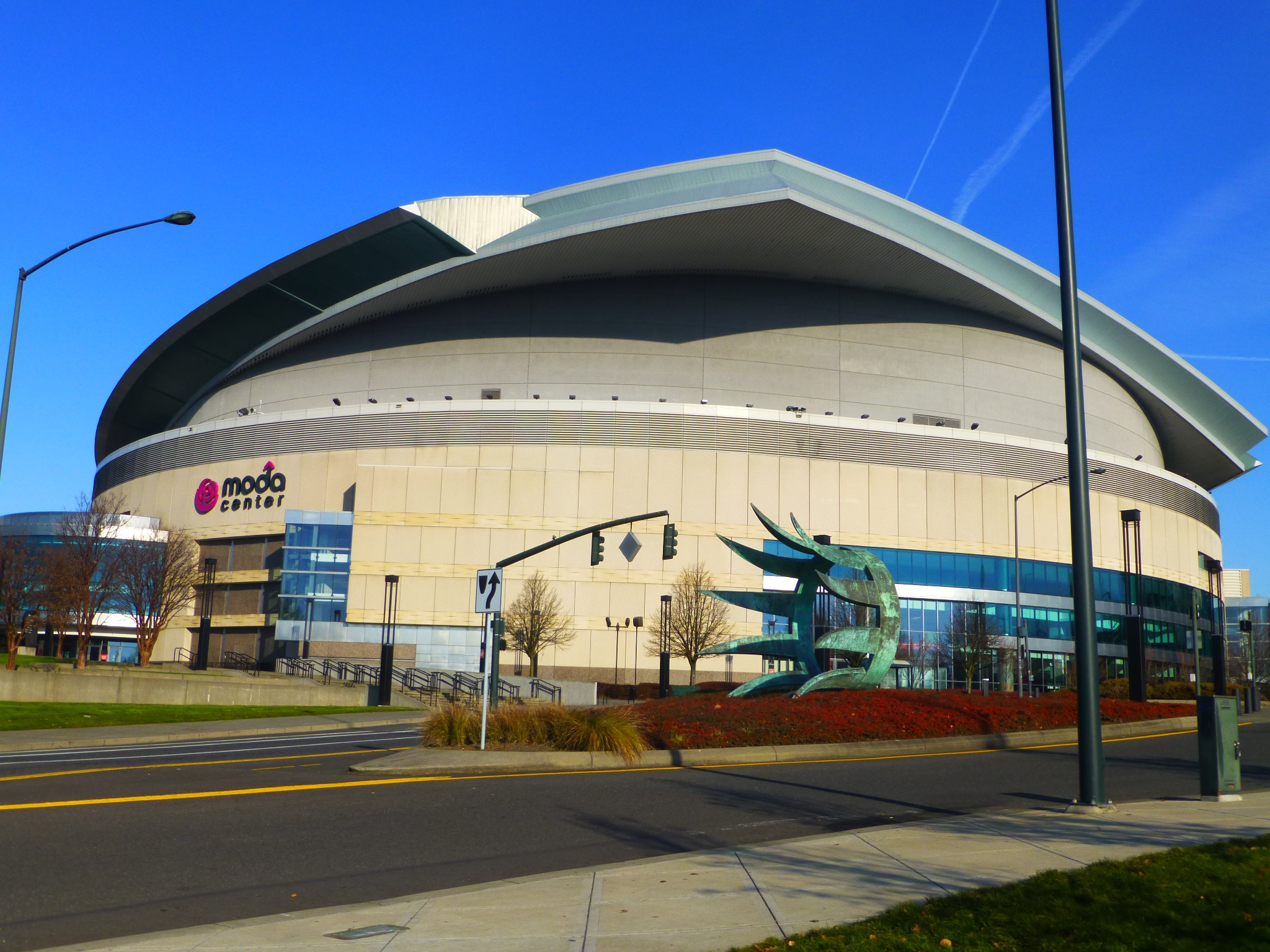
Moda Center (Portland, United States)

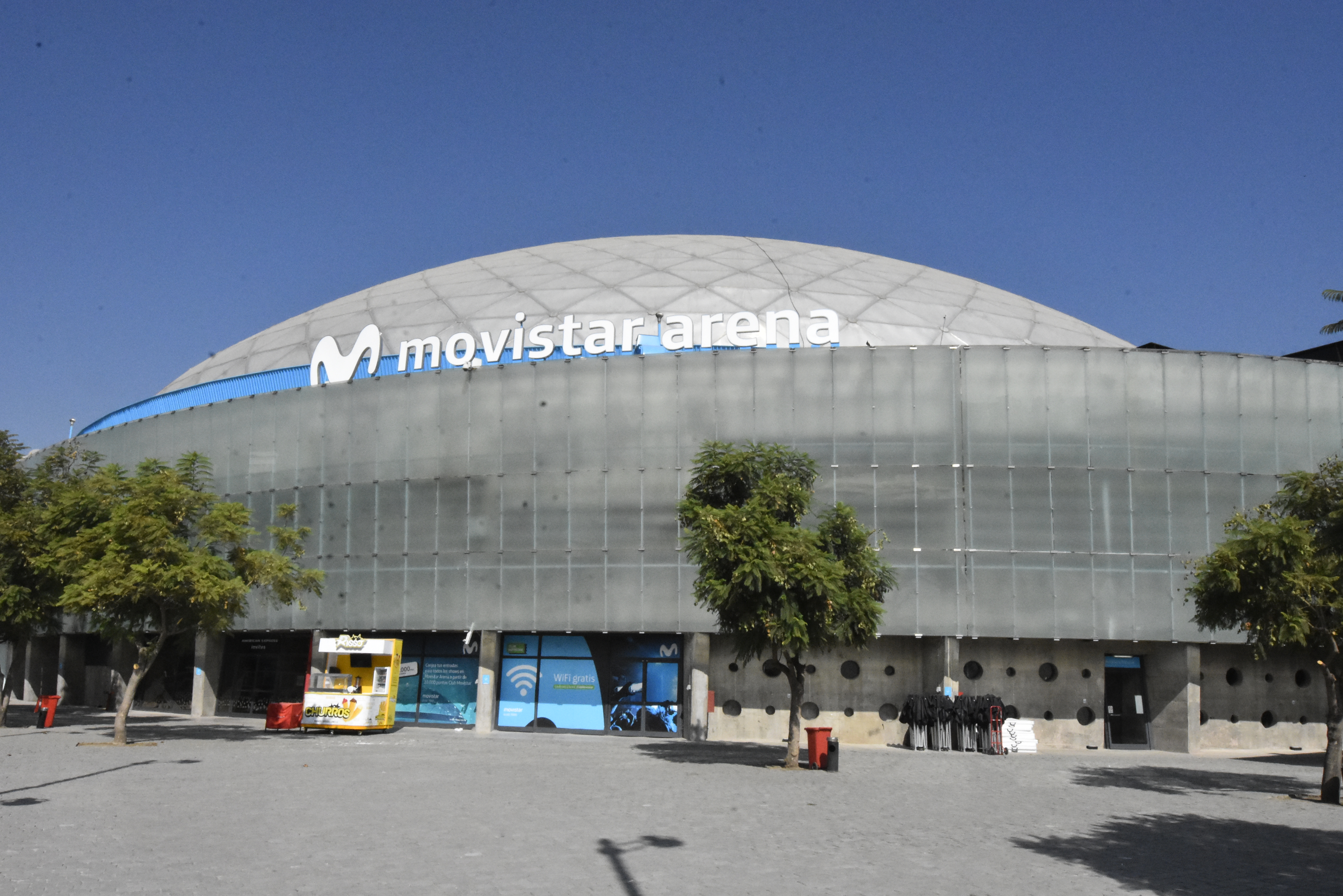
Movistar Arena (Santiago, Chile)

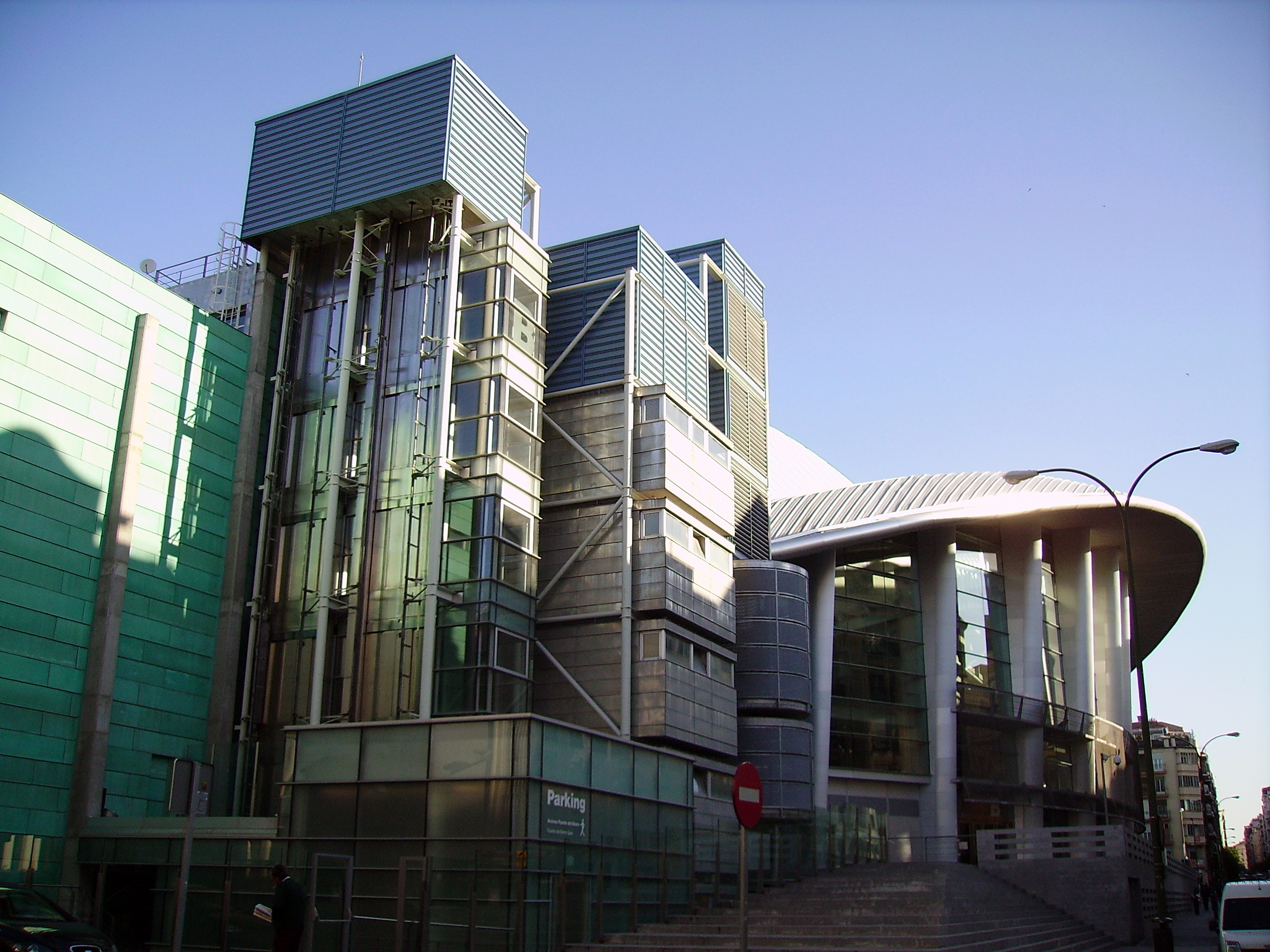
Movistar Arena (Madrid, Spain)

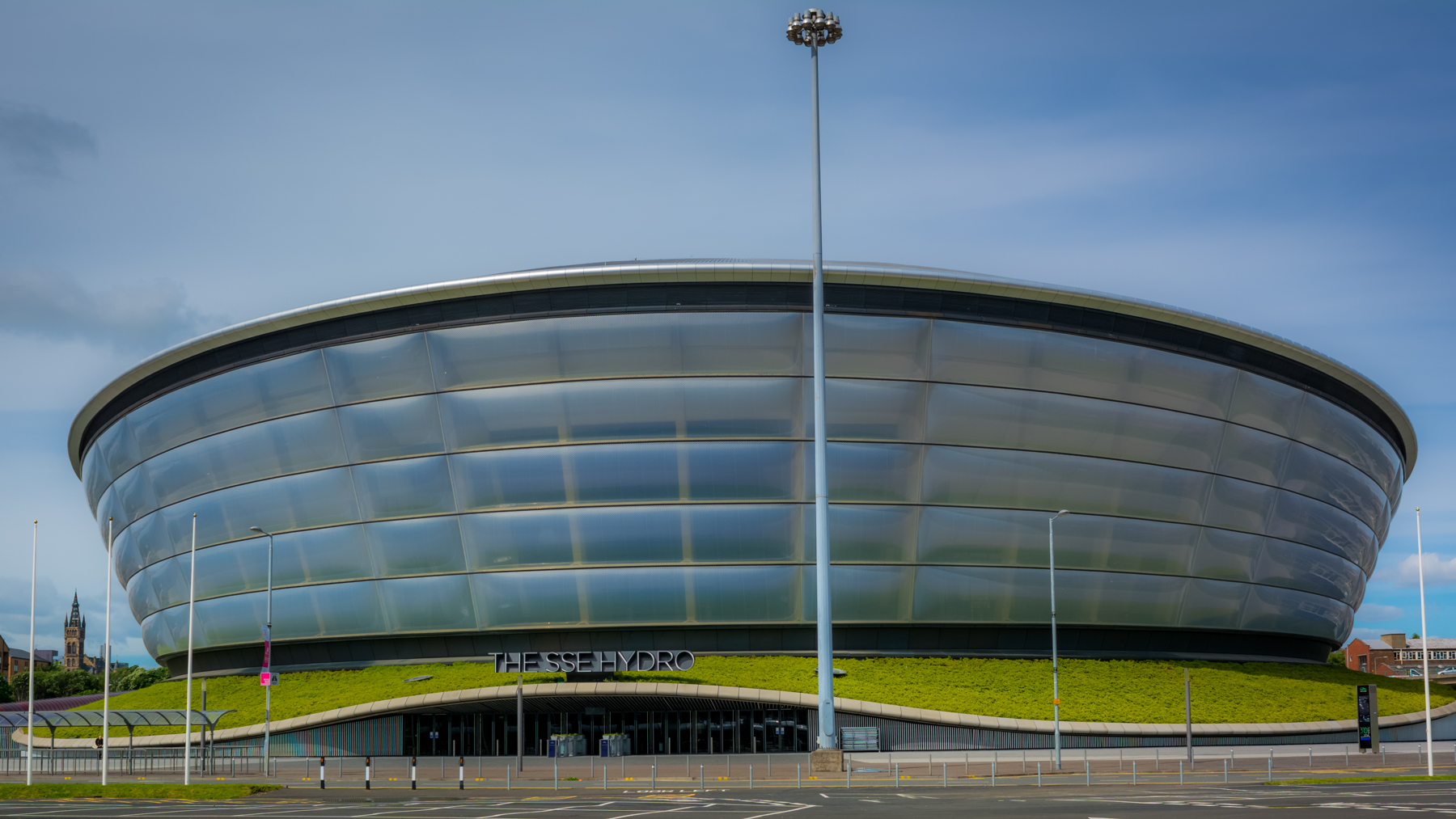
OVO Hydro (Glasgow, Scotland)

Paris La Défense Arena (Paris, France)

Philippine Arena, the world's largest indoor arena (Santa Maria, Philippines)

Rod Laver Arena (Melbourne, Australia)

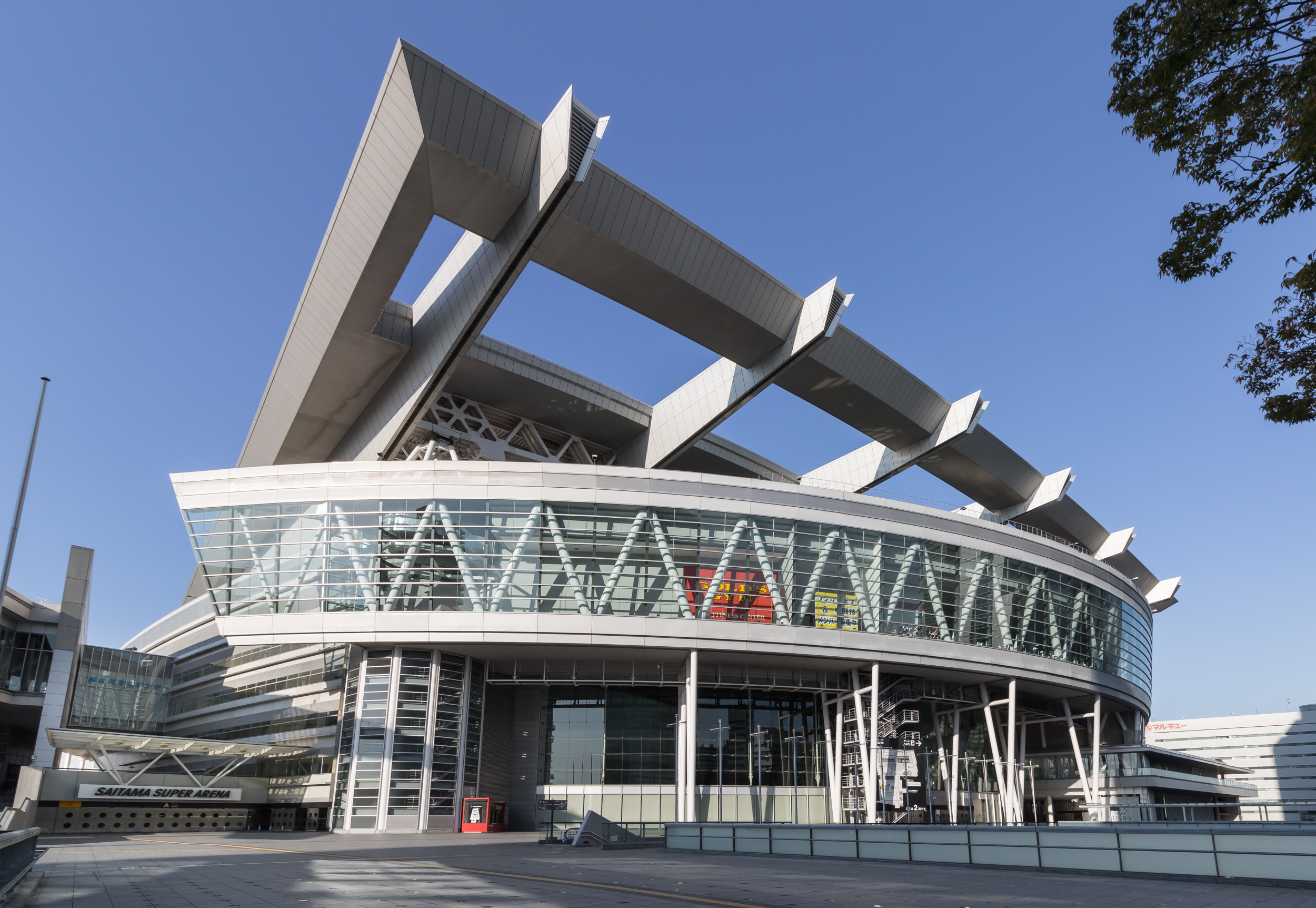
Saitama Super Arena (Saitama, Japan)

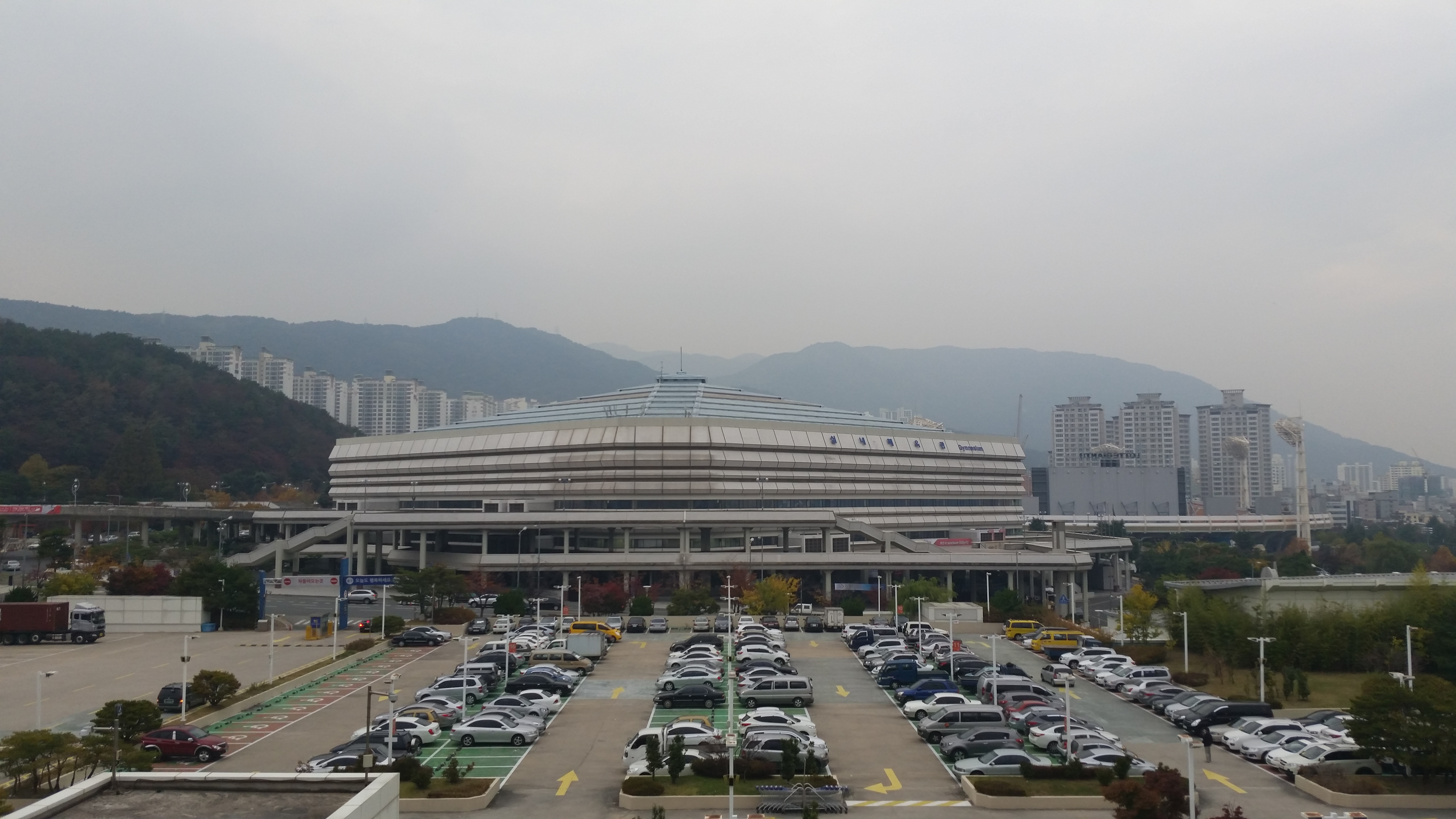
Sajik Arena (Busan, South Korea)

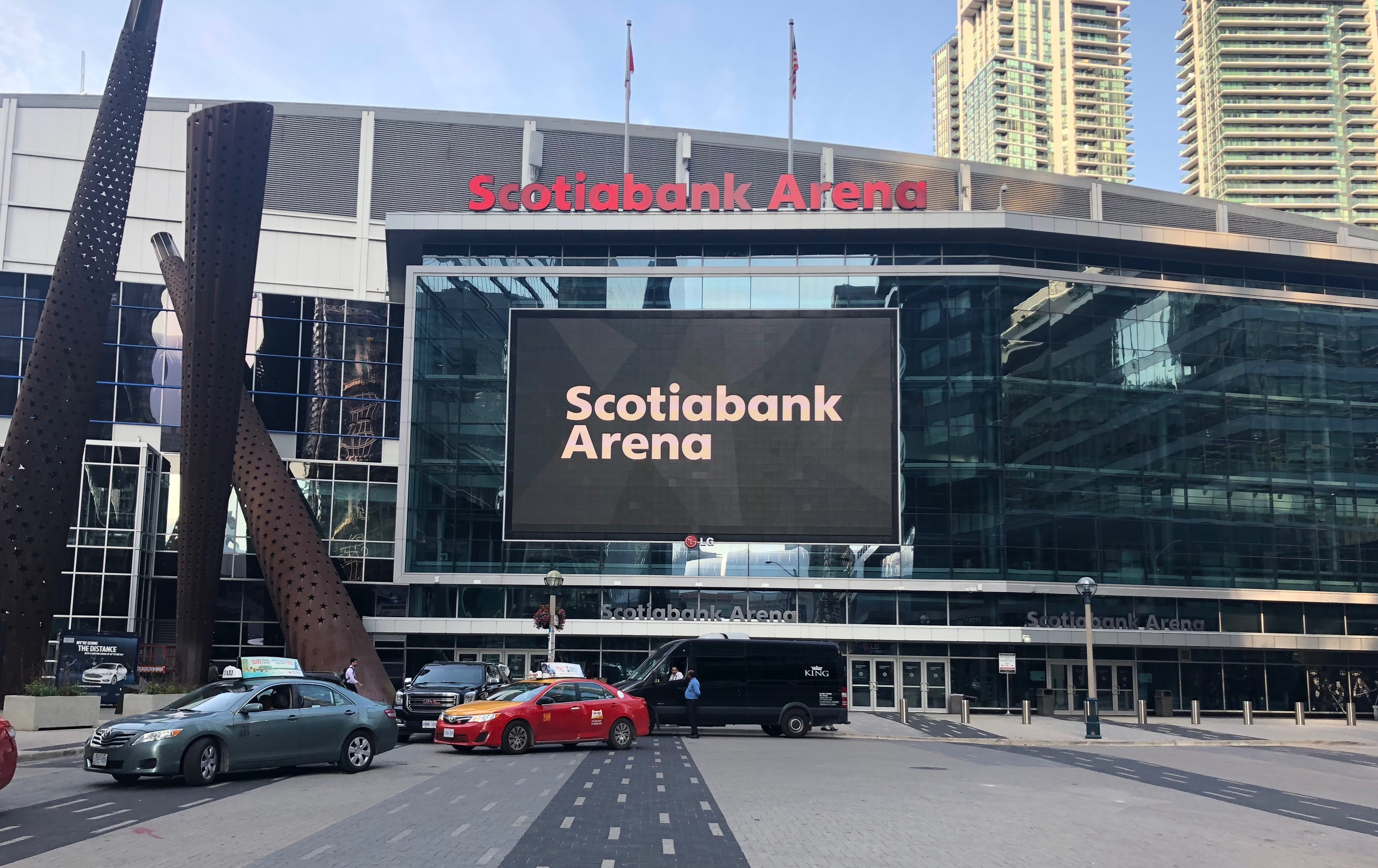
Scotiabank Arena (Toronto, Canada)

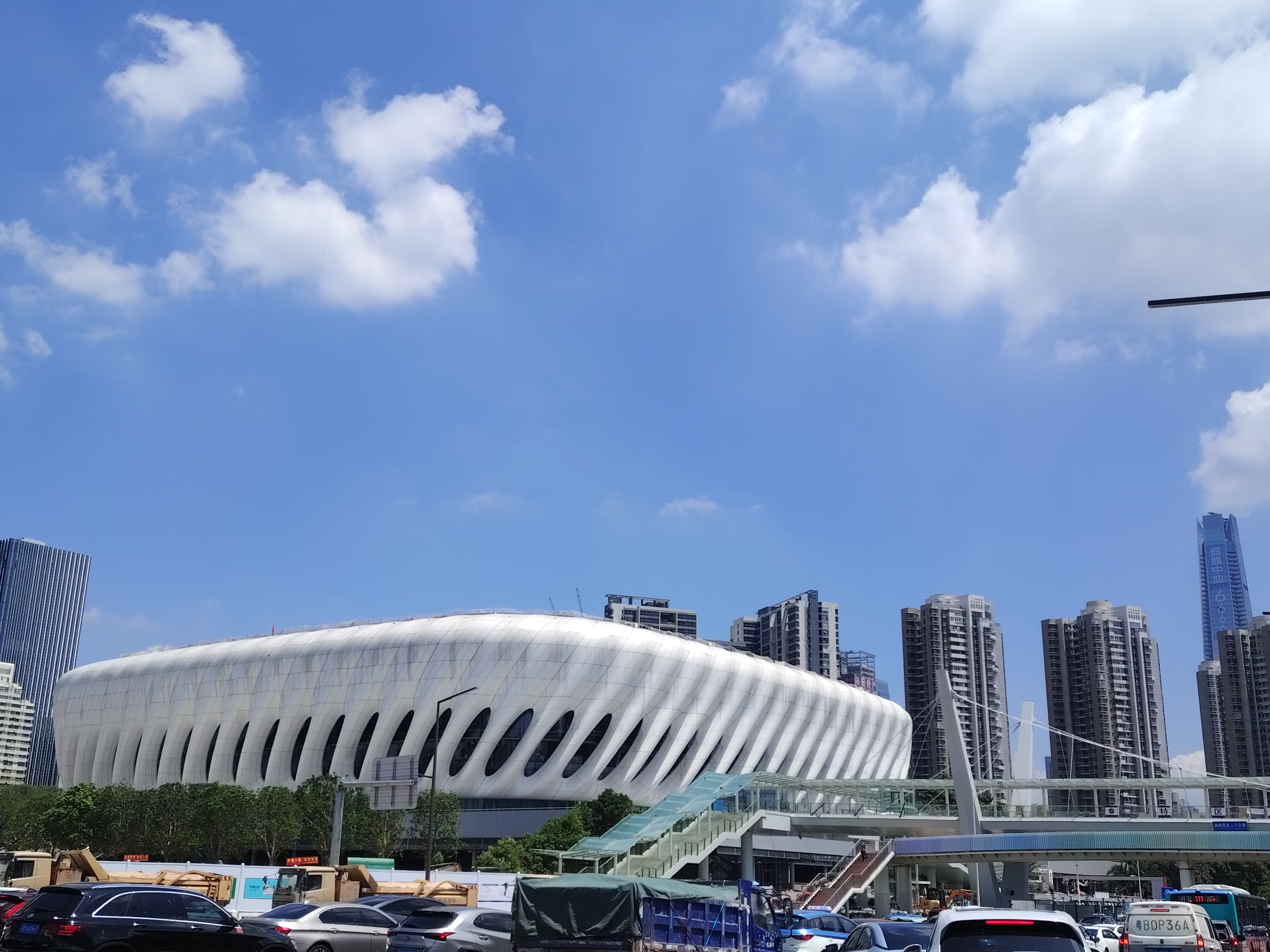
Shenzhen Arena (Shenzhen, China)

== See also ==
- Amphitheatre
- Architectural structure
- Field house
- Ice hockey arena
- Indoor cricket court
- Lists of stadiums
- List of nonbuilding structure types
- List of indoor arenas by capacity
- List of stadiums by capacity
