= Club cricket =

Mainly amateur, but still formal, form of the sport of cricket

Club cricket is a mainly amateur but still formal form of the sport of cricket, usually involving teams playing in competitions at weekends or in the evening. There is a great deal of variation in game format although the Laws of Cricket are observed. The main nations that club cricket is played in include Pakistan, England, Australia, South Africa, Sri Lanka, West Indies, New Zealand, Bangladesh, Nepal, Zimbabwe, Kenya, Ireland, Wales, Scotland, Netherlands, Hong Kong and in some of the major cities in India. Club cricket is also now played in the United States and Canada, as both countries have large communities of immigrants from mainstream cricket-playing regions such as the Caribbean, Europe, Asia, Africa and Australasia.

== Format ==
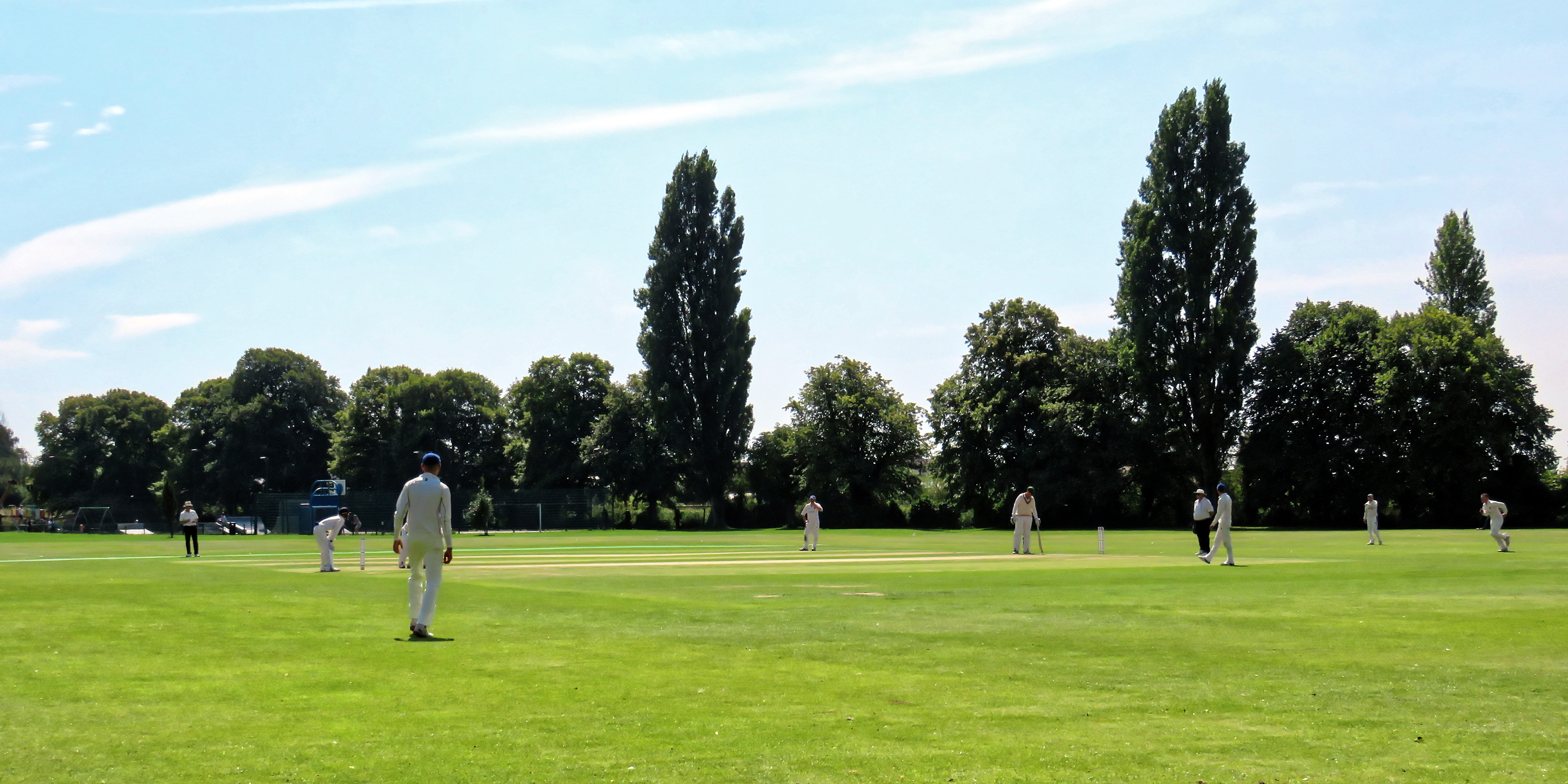
A typical club cricket match in England.

Some club games are played over three days. PattmanSport on YouTube

Club cricket is usually played in league or cup format. Games are limited by either time or overs. A less common, but more traditional, format is limiting the game by time only. Games can range from a few hours in the evening to three days long.

Saturday league cricket is the most serious format of club cricket. The game will usually be a limited overs contest of between 40 and 60 overs per side, with bonus points awarded based on runs, wickets, and whether or not the match was a "winning draw" or an outright win to one-side. This format of cricket covers teams that vary in standard between occasional players in the lower divisions to professional and ex-professional players in the highest leagues.

Friendly cricket often takes place on a Sunday. These games tend to follow the more traditional format of declaration cricket in which a time limit or number of overs - typically 80 to 120 - is set for the whole match. It is then up to the team batting first to declare their innings early enough to give themselves time to bowl the opposition out and force victory. The widest variety of cricket is generally seen in this format, with teams batting second either aggressively chasing a total or attempting to bat conservatively and save the draw.

Evening cricket is the least formal format of club cricket, and the route by which many new players are introduced to the game. It tends to follow the 20-20 version of the game, with additional time saving measures such as using 15 8-ball overs and not re-bowling wides or no-balls (which then count as 2 runs each rather than the standard 1). This version of the game also puts an emphasis on inclusivity, with rules such as each bowler being limited to 2 overs each, and batsmen retiring after reaching 25 runs being used to ensure that every player has a part to play in the outcome of the game.

Finally, in Australia and New Zealand two day matches are occasionally played over both Saturday and Sunday, or, alternatively, over successive Saturdays (though this can sometimes have unfortunate effects on the game where the condition of the pitch and ground changes radically from one week to the next). These matches usually have two innings per side.

== Standard ==
Most players are amateur, but often cricket clubs employ the services of professionals as coaches and players. Many of these have played first-class or Test cricket. Also, first-class players returning from injury will sometimes appear at club level as match practice - for example, Shoaib Akhtar during Pakistan's tour of England in 2006 when he played for Berkswell C.C, a club who are in the well-known Birmingham League. Similarly, Steve Smith and David Warner played in Sydney Grade Cricket during their suspension from the Australia national cricket team during 2018-19.

Standards of play can vary from semi-professional to occasional recreational level. While many clubs train in similar ways to professional teams, village or park cricket is played purely for fun, and club cricket is often played as much for the social element as for the competition. This is particularly true in England where the between-innings teas and post-match beer are as important as the result. However, this may vary depending on the standard.

== Officials ==
In the higher leagues, umpires are appointed by the local umpires association to preside over the game and receive a fee and transport allowance for their time. However, as the number of umpires available is typically considerably less than the number of games scheduled, the majority of games are played without externally appointed umpires. In this scenario, members of the batting side not currently involved in the action take it in turns to take on the umpiring responsibilities, typically in stints of 10 or 15 overs at a time. The umpires are expected to remain impartial and unbiased in their judgements, and although a small degree of bias is occasionally perceived, this arrangement functions remarkably well.

The same scenario applies to scorers. Some teams may have an official scorer who attends all of their home games, but often it is simply left to the batting side to keep score. It is expected that this task is undertaken with impartiality. One means for the fielding side to prevent cheating is to ensure that the scoreboard is updated at the end of each over. This way any unexpected change in the number of runs and wickets would quickly be noticed and challenged.

== Facilities ==
Club cricket is played extensively in most cricketing nations, and also by immigrants from cricketing nations. Club cricket can take place on an artificial turf pitch or a more traditional grass pitch. A traditional grass pitch is compulsory in the UK for entry into the higher divisions of club competitions. The rest of the actual field is always natural grass.

Most clubs have their own ground to play on regularly, including a field and pavilion or club house. Some also have nets for practice. These facilities may be owned or leased by the club itself, or may be provided by the local authority. A groundsman may be employed to look after the pitch and the outfield on either a full-time or part-time basis, or in smaller clubs the pitch may be maintained by the players themselves on a voluntary basis.

Clubs without grounds are known as "wandering" or "nomadic" clubs. Examples include the various sides affiliated to larger clubs, such as the club MCC sides and county "Gentlemen of" sides that often play against schools; school old boy sides, such as Eton Ramblers and Harrow Wanderers, which often play in the Cricketer Cup; and amateur clubs such as the Free Foresters, I Zingari and the XL Club.

Whereas professional cricketers often tour abroad during the winter, many amateur cricket clubs play indoor cricket during the winter months, leading to a full 12 month calendar of cricket fixtures for the keen amateur cricketer.

== See also ==
- List of English cricket clubs
