= Indoor cricket (UK variant) =

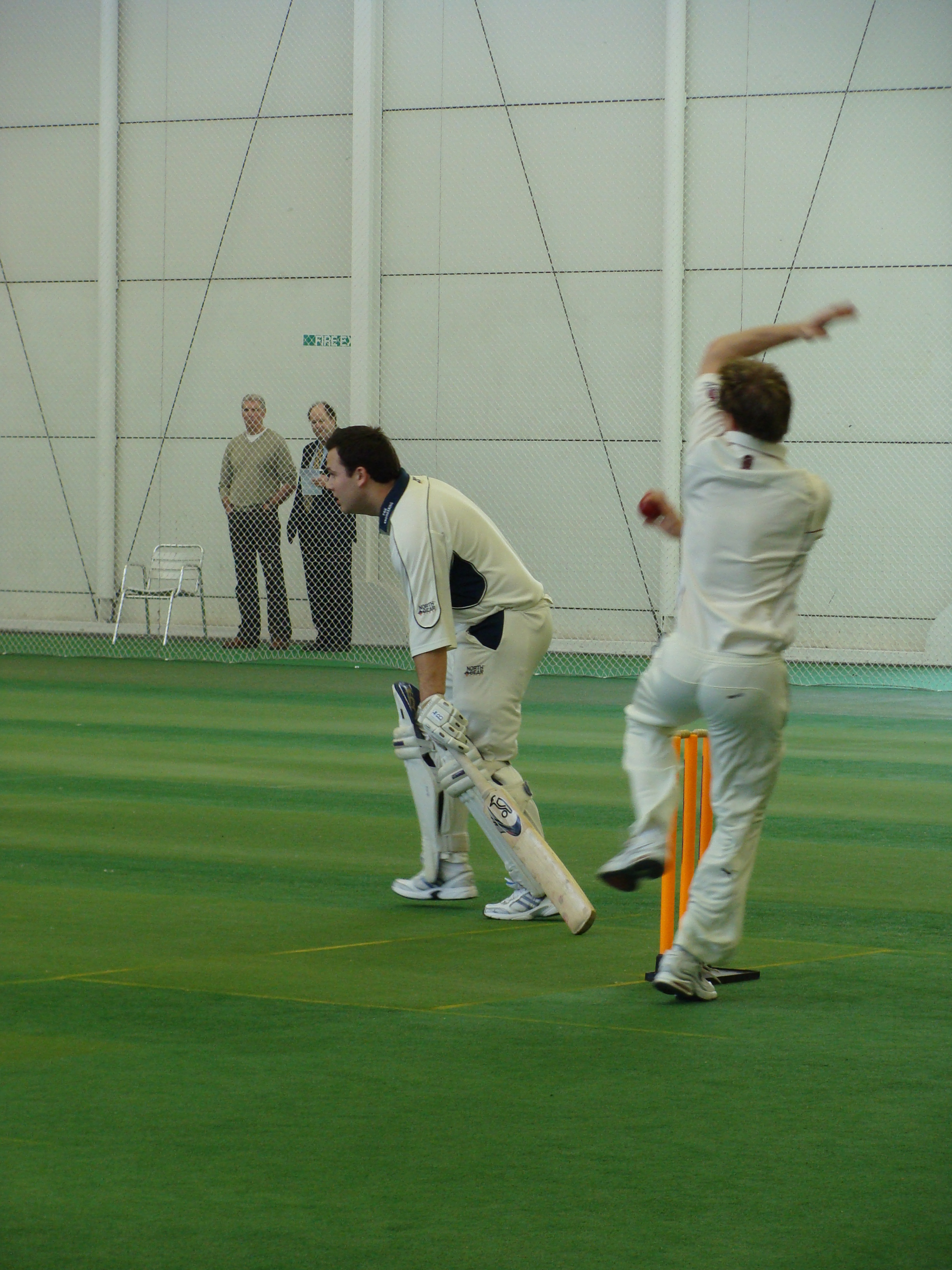
A bowler Bowls a delivery in a game of 6-aside indoor cricket at Lord's cricket ground in London.

The game of indoor cricket can be played in any suitably sized multi-purpose sports hall. There is evidence of the game being played in the 1920s and 1930s. Furthermore, it was played in the 1960s as a means of giving amateur and professional cricketers a means of playing their sport during the winter months. The first recorded organised indoor cricket league in the world took place in 1970 in North Shropshire, and the first national tournament was completed in 1976 with over 400 clubs taking part. By 1979 over 1000 clubs were taking part in indoor cricket in the UK, and it remains extremely popular today with many leagues around the country. Other forms of indoor cricket have been developed, based on variations of the indoor game.

The game itself bears much in common with its outdoor cousin, with a hard ball and a full length pitch being used. Indoor Cricket can be played in any suitably sized sports hall or similar shaped indoor arena. If necessary, a mat is rolled out on the floor to replicate the playing conditions of a cricket pitch. This format should not be confused with the netted variant played elsewhere around the world, predominantly in Australia and South Africa.

== The game of indoor cricket ==
In terms of the concept of the game, indoor cricket is similar to cricket. Like its outdoor cousin, indoor cricket involves two batsmen, a bowler and a team of fielders. The bowler bowls the ball to the batsman who must score runs by hitting the ball with his bat. The fielding team attempt to prevent the scoring of runs and dismiss the batsman. Each team takes it in turn to bat, and the team with the highest score at the end of the match wins. Despite these basic similarities, the game itself differs significantly from its outdoor counterpart in several ways, most notably on the field of play and the means by which runs are obtained.

== Typical rules ==
The rules of 6-aside indoor cricket are identical to that of outdoor cricket with the following exceptions, some of which may vary between local leagues.

There are six players per team, and the game is played over innings of a maximum of 12 overs of six balls, all of which take place from the same end of the pitch.

Bowlers are limited to a maximum of three overs, and batsman must retire upon reaching a personal total of twenty-five runs, but may return to the crease in the event of the rest of their side being dismissed within the 12 overs.

In the event of a team losing five wickets within the 12 overs the last man will continue batting with the fifth man out remaining at the wicket as a runner.

A batsman may be caught out and dismissed directly off the side wall, provided the ball has not also hit the floor or the roof.

=== System of Scoring ===
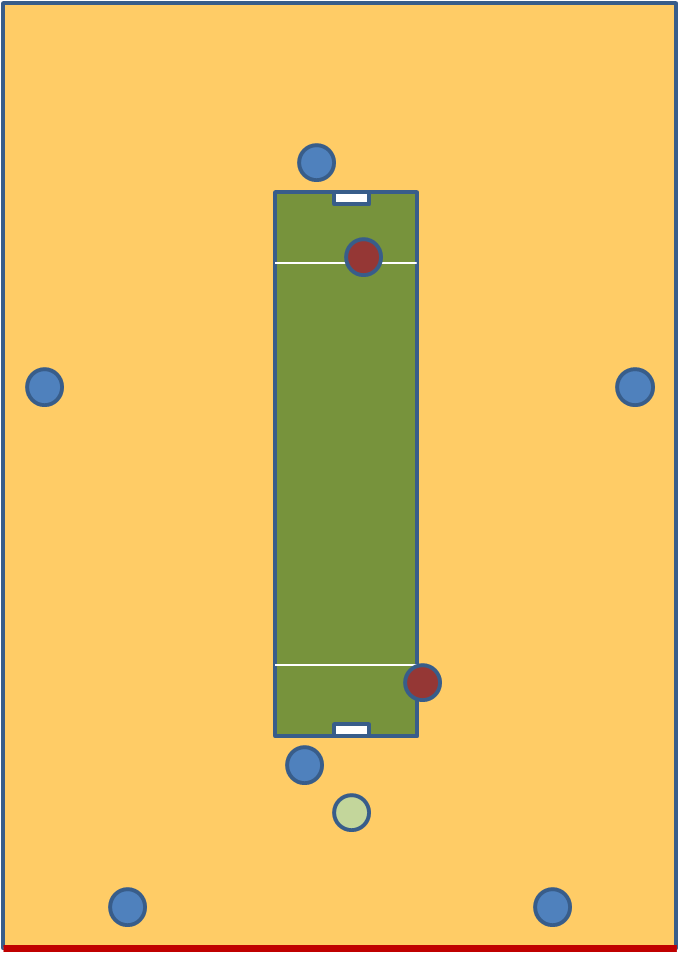
Typical Layout and Field Settings: Blue circles denote fielders, Red circles denote batsmen, Green circle denotes umpire. Boundary wall is shown with red line.

A ball that is struck to hit the boundary wall behind the bowler without touching the floor or any other part of the wall or roof part scores six runs. A ball that is struck to hit the boundary wall behind the bowler and also touches the floor but does not touch any of the other walls or roof and hits the back boundary wall scores four runs. In some leagues these scores are switched around to discourage an over-emphasis on aerial shots.

A ball struck to hit one or more of the side walls will count as one run, even if the ball subsequently hits the back boundary wall. If the ball is struck to hit a side wall and a batsman is then dismissed (for example caught or run out), one run will still be scored.

A ball struck directly to hit the roof becomes dead immediately. No runs will be scored and there will be no dismissal. The ball will not be rebowled. A ball that hits the roof having previously hit a wall is still in play. At some venues, the roof acts as a side wall where 1 run is allocated when the ball touches it, but a fielder can catch the ball and the batsmen is out caught.

Two runs will be scored if the batsmen complete a run at any time. These runs may be scored on top of a run for hitting a side wall, including a bye or leg bye, but not on top of a boundary.

A bye will count as one run if the ball bowled hits a wall. A leg bye will count as one run if the ball hits a side wall after deflecting off the batsman's pads or body.

If the bowler oversteps the crease, bowls a full toss over waist height, or the ball does not pitch on the playing mat, a no-ball will be called and the batting side will be awarded one run. An extra ball will be bowled. Any runs on top of this will still count as usual.

Wide balls will be called as with orthodox cricket rules.

== Strategy ==
The strategy of indoor cricket differs from its outdoor cousin because of the different scoring system. The quickest way to score runs is to hit a boundary against the back wall and score 4 or 6 runs. In order to prevent this, the two best fielders from the fielding side are generally positioned in front of this wall in order to prevent the ball from reaching it.

If the batsman is unable to hit the ball against the back wall, he may instead resort to attempting to score 3 runs by hitting the ball against a side wall and completing a quick single with his partner. In order to attempt to prevent this, the remaining two fielders are generally placed on either side of the batsman in front of the side wall.

Using these tactics, a typical score in a 12 over 6 aside game will vary between 100 and 140 runs per side.

== Popularity ==
Indoor cricket is extremely popular around the UK with many regional and local leagues run independently but loosely affiliated to the ECB. Amateur club teams will often field an 11 aside team in the summer and an indoor 6 aside team in the winter. The better teams in the country can qualify for the ECB National Indoor Cricket Cup, which is the highest standard of Indoor Cricket played in the UK. The game is also widely played at University level.

== See also ==
- Indoor cricket
- Cricket
- Club cricket
