= Indoor cricket court =

An indoor cricket court (also known as an arena of field) is the playing area used in a game of indoor cricket. The court measures 30 metres × 12 metres, and is enclosed by tight netting 7.5 metres high. The playing surface is normally artificial grass matting, with a set of plastic spring-back stumps at each end of the pitch, each measuring 71.1 cm above the floor.

== The pitch ==
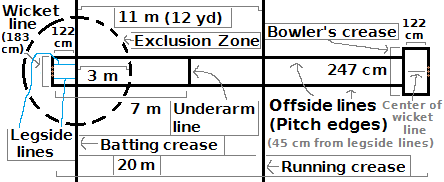
A diagram of an indoor cricket pitch.

The length of an indoor cricket pitch is the same as a conventional cricket pitch, and has 3 stumps at each end, but there the similarities end. The pitch is marked in line with the stumps at each end, and is 1.83 metres in width at the batting end and 2.47 metres at the bowling end, with the stumps in the centre, and the middle stumps are 20 metres apart. The popping crease is in front of, and parallel with, the wicket lines at both ends. At the bowler's end, the pitch is specified as the line extending between the return creases and will be called the bowler's crease or the front foot line. The return creases of the pitch at the bowler's end is marked by a lines at right angles to the bowling crease to the line of the wickets. The return creases are marked 1.22 metres from the middle stump on the line of the wicket. The running crease (or non-striking batter's crease), which is the edge of the crease marking nearest the bowling end, is parallel to the popping crease and extends from one side of the court to the other. The distance between the running crease and the batting crease is 11 metres.

== Scoring zones ==
Scoring in indoor cricket is split into 2 areas: physical runs and bonus runs. Physical runs are scored by both batsmen completing a run from one crease to the other. Bonus runs are scored when the ball hits a net. Bonus scores for particular parts of the nets follow:

An indoor cricket court is divided into 4 scoring zones, each represented by a letter of the alphabet.

- Zone A (front net - behind the keeper): 0 bonus runs
- Zone B (side nets between the striker's end and halfway down the pitch): 1 run
- Zone C (side nets between halfway and the bowlers end): 2 runs
- Zone D (back net - behind the bowler):
  - On the bounce: 4 runs
  - On the full: 6 runs
- Zone B or C onto Zone D: 3 runs

NB: For bonus runs to be scored, at least one physical run must be scored. The bonus runs are then added to the physical runs.

== Fielding positions ==
Fielding positions in indoor cricket are set to achieve two main goals, defend runs and take wickets. The rules specify that there must be 4 players in each half of the court at the time a ball is bowled. Fielding positions are often broken down into two groups, front court and back court, each of which is described below. The diagram below outlines the locations of these fielding positions on the court

=== Front court ===
Common front court fielders include the

- Wicket keeper',
- 1st, 2nd and leg side guards

The role of the wicket keeper is to take catches behind the stumps, stump the batsmen if he is not in his crease, and to assist in run outs at the strikers end. The 1st, 2nd and leg side guards aim to stop the ball from hitting the side net, therefore limiting the runs scored by the batting team.

=== Back Court ===
Common back court fielding positions include the

- Receiver
- 2x Sweepers
- Bowler

The receiver stands at the non strikers end stumps, and has a similar role to the wicket keeper in taking run outs at this end. The receiver also defends the back net. The role of the two sweepers is to both defend scoring zone C and to pick up any loose balls behind the receiver once the ball has been hit. The bowlers job is to, as the name suggests, to deliver the ball.
