= Indoor cricket =

Game derived from cricket

Indoor Cricket
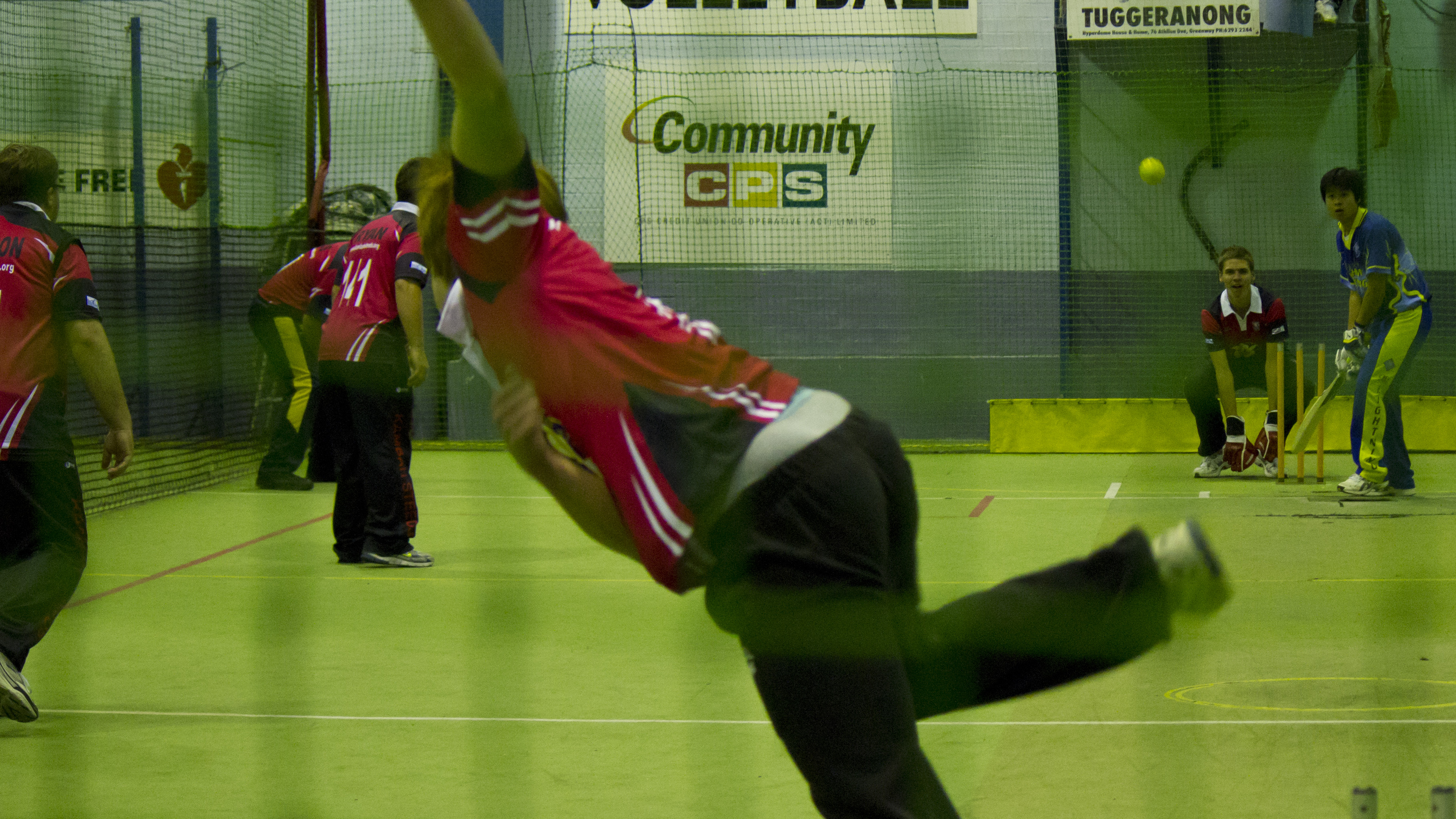
- A bowler bowling to a batter.
- Highest governing body: World Indoor Cricket Federation

Characteristics
- Team members: 8 players per side
- Type: Team, Bat-and-ball
- Equipment: Indoor cricket ball, cricket bat, collapsible wicket
- Venue: Indoor cricket court

Indoor cricket is a variant of and shares many basic concepts with cricket. The game is most often played between two teams each consisting of six or eight players.

Several versions of the game have been in existence since the late 1960s, whilst the game in its present form began to take shape in the late 1970s and early 1980s.

The codified sport of indoor cricket is not to be confused with conventional cricket played indoors, or with other modified versions of cricket played indoors (see other forms of indoor cricket below).

== The game of cricket ==
In terms of the concept of the game indoor cricket is similar to cricket. Like its outdoor cousin, indoor cricket involves two batters, a bowler and a team of fielders. The bowler bowls the ball to the batters who must score runs. The team with the highest score at the end of the match wins. Despite these basic similarities, the game itself differs significantly from its traditional counterpart in several ways, most notably on the field of play and the means by which runs are obtained.

== International rules overview ==
=== Safety gear ===
As a minimum, every male player, including the fielders have to wear an abdominal guard (box), with the person bowling the ball as an exception.
The batsman are required to use batting gloves, primarily for preventing the bat from slipping out of the hands. Indoor batting gloves are readily available at cricket stores, however some indoor cricket facilities also provide basic non-slip gloves that can be shared during the game.
Some players prefer to use hard ball batting gloves to prevent their hands from serious injury, as the indoor cricket ball can cause serious damage.

One optional security gadget is safety goggles to prevent any serious injury to the eyes. As the game speed is usually very fast and the play rigorous, it is a demanding cardiovascular activity. It is recommended to have a doctor checkup before taking up indoor cricket, especially in advance age and/or with any medical conditions. It's fielders right of way when a shot is played, so the batsman/fielder has to be watchful to avoid collisions.
Indoor cricket causes more sporting injuries than casual outdoor cricket, due to the proximity of the ball and fielders. Therefore, a sports/team insurance is important.
Some indoor sports facilities provide these insurances as part of the indoor tournaments.

=== Playing arena ===
The length of an indoor cricket pitch is the same as a conventional cricket pitch, and has 3 stumps at each end, but there the similarities end. The arena is completely enclosed by tight netting, a few metres from each side and end of the pitch. The playing surface is normally artificial grass matting.
Whilst the pitch is the same length, however, the batters do not have to run the entire length.
The striker's crease is in the regulation place in front of the stumps, but the non-striker's crease is only halfway down the pitch.

=== Players ===
Indoor cricket is played between 2 teams of 8 players. Each player must bowl 2 six ball overs, and bat in a partnership for 4 overs.
A faster version of the game exists, where each side is reduced to 6 players and each innings lasts 12 overs instead of 16.

=== Equipment ===
The stumps used in indoor cricket are not, for obvious reasons, stuck in the ground. Instead, they are collapsible spring-loaded stumps that immediately spring back to the standing position when knocked over. The ball used in indoor cricket is a modified cricket ball, with a softer centre.
The ball also differs in that it is yellow to make it more obvious to see indoors against varied backgrounds. Both traditional outdoor cricket bats or more specialised lighter-weight indoor cricket bats may be used. The gloves are typically lightweight cotton with no protective padding on the outside.
The palm-side of the gloves usually have embedded rubber dots to aid grip.

=== Scoring ===
Scoring in indoor cricket is divided into 4 types: physical runs, bonus runs, the usual extras/sundries, and penalty-minus runs.
Physical runs are scored by both batters completing a run from one crease to the other.
Bonus runs are scored when the ball hits a net.
Bonus scores for particular parts of the nets follow:

- Zone A (front net – behind the keeper): 0 runs
- Zone B (side nets between the striker's end and halfway down the pitch): 1 run
- Zone C (side nets between halfway and the bowler's end): 2 runs
- Zone D (back net – behind the bowler): 4 or 6 runs depending on how the ball hit the back net.
  - On the bounce: 4 runs
  - On the full: 6 runs
- Zone B or C onto Zone D: 3 runs

NB: For bonus runs to be scored, at least one physical run must be scored. The bonus runs are then added to the physical runs.
For example, a batsman strikes the ball, hits the back net on the full (6), and he/she makes one physical run, for a total of 7 runs.
Extras/sundries are the same as those in formal cricket and consist of wides, no-balls etcetera.
Penalty-minus runs are the set number of runs deducted from a team's score for each dismissal.

=== Dismissals ===
A batsman can be dismissed in the same ways they can be in conventional cricket – with variations in the case of LBW and mankad (see below) – and with the exception of timed out. When a batsman gets dismissed, however, five runs are deducted from their total and they continue to bat.
Batters bat in pairs for 4 overs at a time, irrespective of whether they are dismissed. A player can also be "caught" by a ball rebounding off a net, except off a "six", as long as it has not previously touched the ground. This negates any physical or bonus runs that might have been awarded.

A method of dismissal in indoor cricket that is far more prevalent than its outdoor counterpart is the mankad.
A mankad is given out if the bowler completes their bowling action without releasing the ball, breaks the stumps at their end without letting go of the ball and the non-striker is out of their ground.

Whilst lbw is a valid form of dismissal in indoor cricket, it is a far rarer occurrence in indoor than it is in outdoor cricket.
A batsman can only be dismissed lbw if he does not offer a shot and the umpire is satisfied that the ball would then have hit the stumps.

=== Officials ===
Indoor cricket is officiated by one umpire who is situated outside of the playing area at the strike batters' end of the court. The umpire sits or stands on a raised platform that is usually 3 metres above ground level. Secondary officials (such as scorers or video umpires) have sometimes been utilised in national or international competition.

=== Result ===
The team with the higher score at the conclusion of each innings is declared the winner of the match. The second innings continues for a full 16 overs even if the batting side passes the first innings total due to the possibility of a side finishing behind a total even after they have surpassed it (see dismissals above).

In most cases indoor cricket is played according to a skins system, where the batting partnerships from each innings are compared against one another and the higher of the two is deemed to have won the skin. For example, the second batting partnership in the first innings might score 5 runs whilst the second partnership in the second innings scores 10 – the latter would be deemed to have won the skin. The team that has won the greater of the four skins available is often awarded the win if the totals are tied.

== 3 Dot balls Rule ==
Most indoor cricket centres employ a dot ball rule, where the scoreboard has to change at least every third ball. This means if the batters play 2 consecutive balls without a change in the scorecard (applies on multiple batters over multiple overs), the scorecard has to change on the 3rd ball. It can be changed by batsman scoring a run, extra runs or in the case where a run is not scored on the 3rd consecutive ball, the batsman is declared out and 5 runs deducted off the score, hence changing the scorecard.

=== Jackpot ball Rule ===
Some indoor leagues have the first or last ball of a 'Skin' declared a jackpot ball. This means any runs scored on the jackpot ball will be doubled. e.g. if a '7' is hit, it will counted as 14 runs and if a wicket is lost, it will be counted as minus 10 runs.

== Types of match and competition ==
Indoor cricket is typically played either as a six- or eight-a-side match, and with six- or eight-ball overs respectively. The game can be played in men's, women's and mixed competitions. Permutations of the game include bonus overs (where the bonus score is double, dismissals result in seven (7) runs (cf. five (5) runs) being deducted from the team score and fielding restrictions removed.)

=== Test Match ===
Test indoor cricket is the highest standard of indoor cricket and is played between members of the World Indoor Cricket Federation.

The first international Test matches were played between Australia and New Zealand in 1985. Those sides have since been joined on the international stage by England (1990), South Africa (1991), Zimbabwe (1998), Namibia (1998), India (2000), Pakistan (2000), Sri Lanka (2002), United Arab Emirates (2004), Wales (2007), France (2007), Guernsey (2007), Singapore (2013), Malaysia (2017).

Test matches are usually played in a group of matches called a "series" featuring two to four nations. These series can consist of three to five matches and where more than two nations are involved, may also include a finals series. Matches played at World Cup events are also considered Test matches.

International competition is also organised for juniors and masters age groups. The matches are considered Test matches within their respective divisions.

Since 1985, most Test series between Australia and New Zealand have played for the Trans Tasman trophy. Similarly, since 1990, Test series between Australia and England have been played for a trophy known as The Ashes, a name borrowed from the trophy contested by the same nations in outdoor cricket.

=== National championships ===
Each member nation of the WICF usually holds its own national titles. In Australia, states and territories compete in the Australian Indoor Cricket Championships (as well as the now defunct National League).

The national competition in New Zealand is referred to as the Tri Series and is contested by three provinces – Northern, Central and Southern.

National championships contested elsewhere in the world include South Africa's National Championship and England's National League.

=== Minor Competition ===
In addition to social competition played throughout the world there are several state leagues and competitions within each nation. Various states, provinces or geographical areas organise their own state championships (referred to in Australia as "Superleague" – not to be confused with the ill-fated Rugby League competition). Various districts, centres or arenas take part in these competitions including the Rec Club Miranda which is one of Sydney's oldest indoor cricket centres.

=== World Cup ===
The Indoor Cricket World cup was first held in Birmingham, England in 1995 and has run every two or three years since. The event usually also features age-group, masters' and women's competitions. The last World Cup was held in Wellington (NZ) in October 2014. Australia came first in the boys', girls', women's and men's competitions. Australia has won all 9 Open Men World Cup titles (since 1995) and all 8 Open World Cup titles (since 1998).

== Origin and development of indoor cricket ==
The first significant example of organised indoor cricket took place, somewhat unusually, in Germany. A tournament was held under the auspices of the Husum Cricket Club in a hall in Flensburg in the winter of 1968–69.

It was not until the 1970s that the game began to take shape as a codified sport. Conceived as a way of keeping cricketers involved during the winter months, various six-a-side leagues were formed throughout England in the first half of the decade, eventually leading to the first national competition held in March 1976 at the Sobell Center in Islington. This distinct form of indoor cricket is still played today.

Despite the early popularity of the sport in England, a different version of indoor cricket developed by two different parties in Perth, Western Australia in the late 1970s evolved into the sport known as indoor cricket today. Against the backdrop of the upheaval in the conventional game caused by World Series Cricket, torrential rain and a desire to keep their charges active led cricket school administrators Dennis Lillee and Graeme Monaghan to set up netted arenas indoors. Concurrently, entrepreneurs Paul Hanna and Michael Jones began creating an eight-a-side game that eventually led to the nationwide franchise known as Indoor Cricket Arenas (ICA). It was not long before hundreds of ICA-branded stadiums were set up throughout Australia, leading to the first national championships held in 1984 at a time when over 200,000 people were estimated to be participating in the sport.

The sport underwent several organisational changes, most notably in Australia and in South Africa (where competing organisations fought for control of the sport), but the game has changed little since that time and has risen in popularity in several nations. Under the auspices of the World Indoor Cricket Federation the sport has reached a point where is played according to the same standard rules in major competitions throughout the world.

== International structure of indoor cricket ==
The World Indoor Cricket Federation is the international governing body of cricket. It was founded prior to the 1995 World Cup by representatives from Australia, New Zealand, South Africa and England.

Nations may either be full members or associate members of the WICF. Each member nation has its own national body which regulates matches played in its country. The national bodies are responsible for selecting representatives for its national side and organising home and away internationals for the side.

Nation	Governing body	Member status
Australia	Cricket Australia	Full Member
England	England and Wales Cricket Board	Full Member
India	Indian Indoor Sports Foundation	Full Member
New Zealand	New Zealand Indoor Sports	Full Member
South Africa	Indoor Cricket South Africa	Full Member
Sri Lanka	Ceylon Indoor Cricket Association	Membership Under Investigation
Singapore	Singapore Cricket Association	Associate Member
Wales	England and Wales Cricket Board	Associate Member

== Other forms of indoor cricket ==
=== Conventional cricket indoors ===
Conventional cricket matches have taken place at covered venues (usually featuring a retractable roof) and can thus be regarded as cricket being played indoors, such as Docklands Stadium in Melbourne, Australia. Such matches are relatively infrequent and come with added complications in the event that the ball makes contact with the roof while in play.

=== UK variant ===
A version of indoor cricket (bearing greater resemblance to conventional cricket) is played exclusively in the United Kingdom. This variant sees the six players on each team utilise the same playing and protective equipment that can be found in outdoor cricket, and is played in indoor facilities that differ greatly from the international form of indoor cricket.

Despite lacking international competition, this form of indoor cricket enjoys a strong following in the UK, and, like its international counterpart, enjoys the support of the ECB.

== See also ==
- Arena football
- Box Lacrosse
- Down and up
- Indoor Soccer
