= World Indoor Cricket Federation =

- Logo of the WICF
- Formation: 11 May 2004 (present form)
- Headquarters: Brisbane, Australia
- President: Tony Watkins
- Key people: Brian Binch (Vice President) & Ray Lourens (Secretary-General)
- Website: www.worldindoorcricketfederation.com

The World Indoor Cricket Federation is an organisation which overlooks and maintains the Rules of Indoor Cricket.

== Role in the game ==
=== Rules and regulation ===
The WICF overlooks and maintains the Rules of Indoor Cricket. Whilst the official rules as adopted by the WICF are used at any international event, the various member bodies do not necessarily employ the internationally accepted rules within their own domestic competitions.

=== Competitions ===
In addition to various international test series the WICF organised and promotes regular events in several age groups, such as the Indoor Cricket World Cup, the Junior World Series of Indoor Cricket and the Masters World Series of Indoor Cricket. These events are contested by the members and associate members of the WICF and have historically been held at varying intervals. In recent times, these events are held every two years.

=== Development ===
In order to ensure the viability and success of the sport on an international level, the WICF has been active in promoting and developing the sport throughout the world. This process has resulted in the inclusion of several new countries at international events, most notably Sri Lanka, India and Pakistan.

== Governance ==
The WICF is governed by a board of directors elected by the various member bodies and is managed by an appointed Secretary-General.
